= 2012 IIHF World Championship =

2012 edition of the IIHF World Championship

Tournament details
- Host countries: Finland; Sweden
- Venues: 2 (in 2 host cities)
- Dates: 4–20 May
- Opened by: Sauli Niinistö and Carl XVI Gustaf
- Teams: 16

Final positions
- Champions: Russia (4th title)
- Runners-up: Slovakia
- Third place: Czech Republic
- Fourth place: Finland

Tournament statistics
- Games played: 64
- Goals scored: 376 (5.88 per game)
- Attendance: 451,054 (7,048 per game)
- Scoring leader(s): (Russia) Evgeni Malkin (19 points)

Awards
- MVP: (Russia) Evgeni Malkin

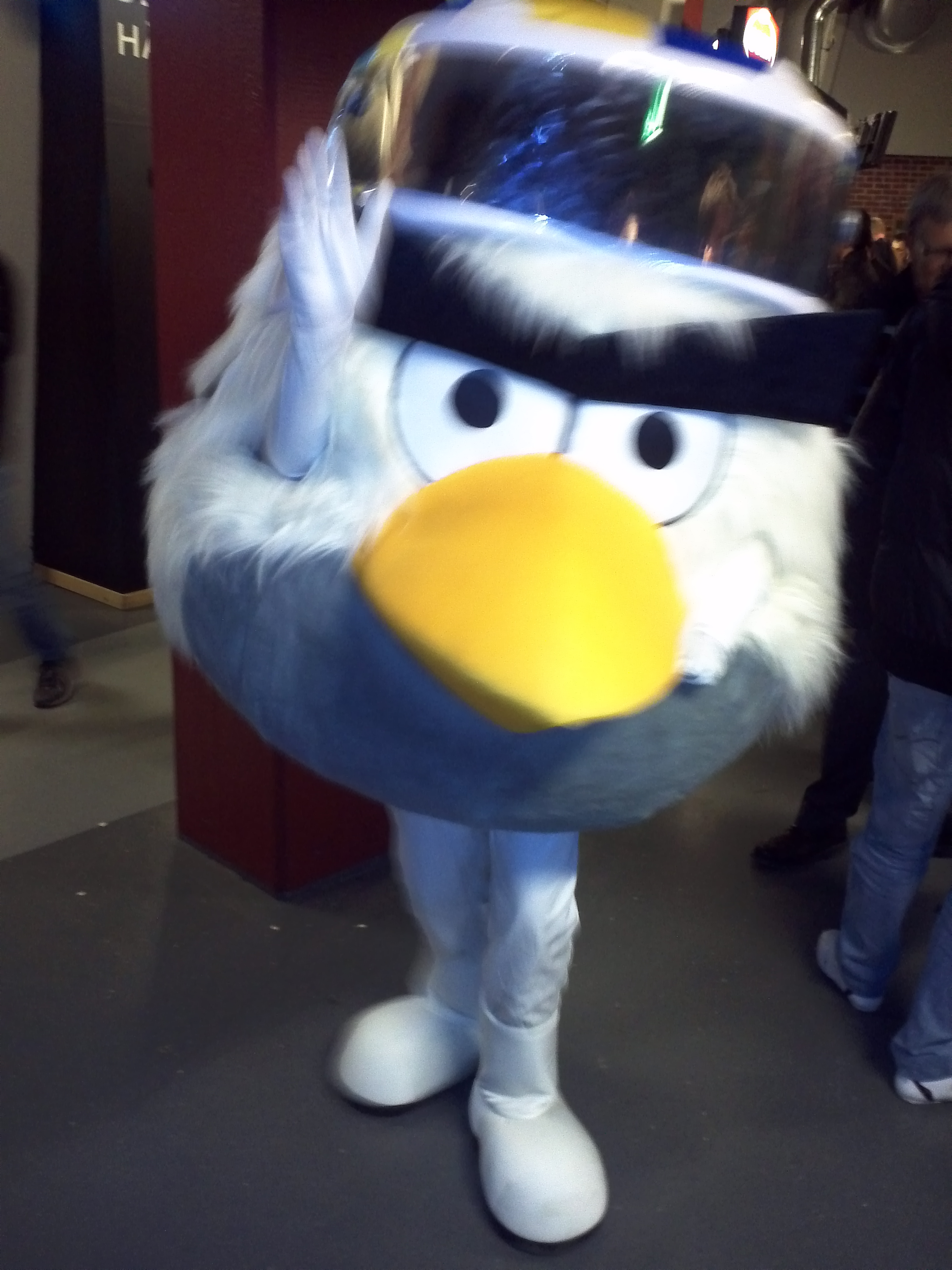
HockeyBird, the tournament's mascot.

The 2012 IIHF World Championship was the 76th IIHF World Championship, an annual international ice hockey tournament. It took place between 4–20 May 2012 in Helsinki, Finland and Stockholm, Sweden. This tournament determined the countries' seeding for the men's Olympic Ice Hockey tournament in Sochi for the 2014 Winter Olympics, and for all countries participating in the qualification program leading up to the Olympics.

Russia won the tournament by defeating Slovakia 6–2 in the Final game; the Russians finished the tournament undefeated with a record of 10–0–0, becoming the first team to win every game in regulation since the Soviet Union in the 1989 World Championships. The Czech Republic captured the bronze medal by defeating co-host Finland 3–2 in the bronze medal game. The tournament's top scorer, Russia's Evgeni Malkin, was named the most valuable player of the tournament.

== Host selection ==
At the IIHF congress in Moscow in 2007 four nations submitted bids to host the 2012 World Championship: Finland, Sweden, the Czech Republic and Hungary. The Hungarian and Czech bids were withdrawn before the vote, which was then contested by Finland and Sweden. Finland won with 64 votes to Sweden's 35. Sweden later won the vote to host the 2013 World Championship. At the congress in Bern in 2009, it was announced that Finland and Sweden would instead co-host both the 2012 and 2013 tournaments.

Kimmo Leinonen served as the general secretary of the jointly-hosted events.

=== Voting results ===
Country	Votes
Finland	64
Sweden	35

== Venues ==
Group A preliminary round and quarterfinals were played in Hartwall Areena, Helsinki. Group B preliminary round and quarterfinals were played in Ericsson Globe, Stockholm. All semifinal and medal games were played at the Hartwall Areena.

Hartwall Areena Capacity: 13,506	2012 IIHF World Championship is located in Scandinavia	Ericsson Globe Capacity: 13,850
Finland – Helsinki	2012 IIHF World Championship is located in Scandinavia	Sweden – Stockholm

== Format ==
For the first time since 2000, a new format was adopted in the IIHF World Hockey Championships. The preliminary round and qualification round were merged into one (two pools of eight teams), with the top four teams from each pool advancing to the quarterfinals.

== Rosters ==
Each team's roster for the 2012 IIHF World Championship consisted of at least 15 skaters (forwards, and defencemen) and 2 goaltenders, and at most 22 skaters and 3 goaltenders. All sixteen participating nations, through the confirmation of their respective national associations, had to submit a roster by the first IIHF directorate meeting.

== Summary ==
=== Preliminary round ===
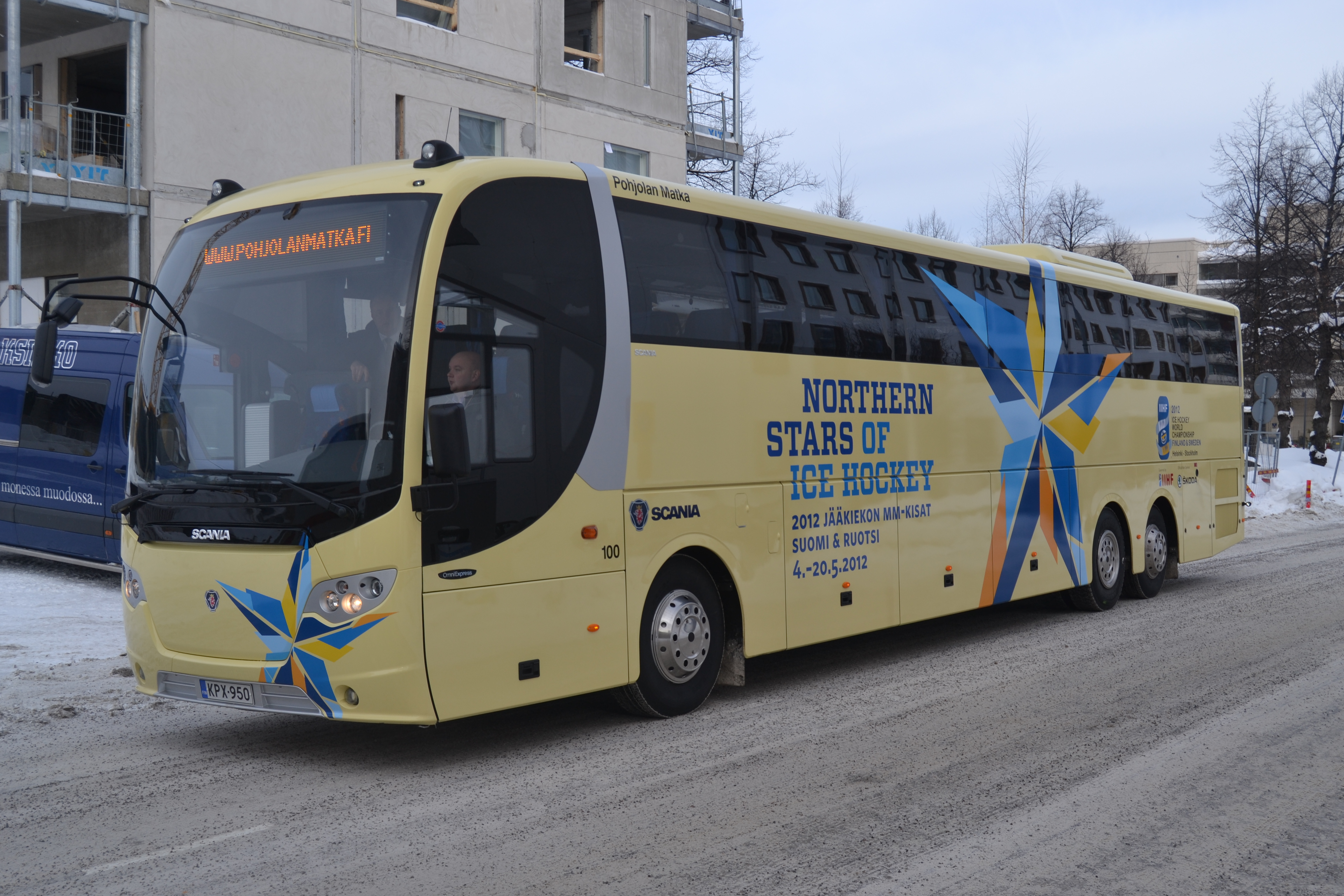
Scania AB bus in 2012 IIHF World Championship livery

Group H (Helsinki)

This group saw the three favourites, Canada, the United States and Finland advance pretty easily. All three teams advanced a day before the group play was done. Canada lost just one game, their second game, against the Americans in overtime. The Americans themselves needed to win their last game against Switzerland to capture the second place in the group ahead of Finland and did so with the result being 5–2. For the final spot of advancing, Slovakia and France played in a "final", where France needed a win to advance to the quarterfinals. The game was close throughout, tied the whole way until it was 4–4, this is when Slovakia scored the final and decisive goal to win 5–4 and get to the fourth spot in the group. France, Switzerland were eliminated alongside Belarus, with Kazakhstan finishing in the last spot and being relegated. They ended the tournament with one point, by losing to the United States in overtime. Canada faced Slovakia, and the United States played against Finland in the quarterfinals.

Group S (Stockholm)

Russia went through the group undefeated by winning all seven games. Co-host Sweden captured the second place, after falling short to Russia. Czech Republic rounded up the third place and advanced to the quarterfinals. Norway, Latvia and Germany all fought for the last spot in the next round but Germany was eliminated after failing miserably 4–12 to Norway. Latvia lost to Denmark and was eliminated, which meant that Norway advanced. Italy finished last and was relegated to Division I. In the quarterfinals, Russia took on Norway, while Sweden battled the Czech Republic.

=== Quarterfinals ===
Canada vs. Slovakia

The Slovak team was the underdog going against Team Canada who had lost just one game so far. But the game started with a surprising strong start by Slovakia, who scored twice in the first 10 minutes to get a 2–0 lead. Evander Kane was able to cut into the lead before going into the first break. In the second period Canada scored twice and got the lead and Slovakia was down by one going into the last period. With just 6 and a half minutes to go Milan Bartovič tied the game before Michal Handzuš even took the lead with a bit over two minutes to go. Canada pulled the goalie but was not able to connect against and lost 3–4. The crowd was stunned and the surprise perfect, Slovakia advanced to the semifinals while Canada was eliminated.

Russia vs. Norway

The undefeated Russian team added Alexander Semin and Alexander Ovechkin to their roster before the quarterfinals. Ovechkin went right away and scored the equalizer after Per-Åge Skrøder gave Norway the lead. After Russia took the lead, Patrick Thoresen made it a tied game just 28 seconds after the second period started, with his 18th point of the tournament. The game went into the last period tied, 2–2. Not even one minute into the third period, Alexei Emelin gave Russia the lead. After Russia raised the lead to two, Ilya Nikulin finished Norway off by making it a 5–2 lead with just five minutes to go. Norway was outshot 45–21 and eliminated.

United States vs. Finland

Co-Host Finland tried to advance against the US-team who they lost to in the preliminary round. The first period ended scoreless, before Jesse Joensuu broke the tie, just to be answered 21 seconds later by Kyle Palmieri. With the game going 1–1 into the last period, the United States took the lead with under two minutes played. Mikko Koivu tied the game seven minutes before the end of the game. With everyone expecting an overtime, Jesse Joensuu struck again, just nine seconds before the end. The US pulled the goalie but never had another chance and were eliminated.

Sweden vs. Czech Republic

The last quarterfinals saw Co-host Sweden going up against the Czech team. The first period ended in a 2–1 lead for the Czech Republic after Sweden took the lead early on. Martin Erat scored and gave the Czechs a two-goal lead before Henrik Zetterberg cut into the lead 45 seconds before the end of the second period. Jonathan Ericsson continued the Swedish way of climbing back by tying the game just 45 seconds into the last period. Both teams had their chance in the next few minutes, Sweden hit the post and the Czechs failed to score against Viktor Fasth. 29 seconds before the end, Michálek took the puck away from a Swedish defender and scored. Sweden pulled the goalie and had one last chance but it was missed and the Czech advanced to the semifinals. The Czechs became the first team since Finland in 2000 to eliminate Sweden in a World Championship quarterfinal.

=== Semifinals ===
Russia vs. Finland

Seven minutes into the game, Janne Niskala gave Finland the lead. Two goals from Evgeni Malkin brought Russia back into the game going into the first intermission. In the second period Alexander Ovechkin increased the lead to 3–1; a while later Malkin would increase Russia's lead to 4–1. Denis Kokarev then scored another goal and with Russia in control of the game, yet another after that. Four minutes before the end of the game Mikael Granlund scored the last goal of the game, as it ended 6–2 in favour of Russia although they were out-shot 23 to 31. Malkin was the player of the game with scoring a hat trick to give him 18 points for the tournament. Russia advanced to the final to try to win their twenty-sixth title, while Finland will battle for bronze.

Czech Republic vs. Slovakia

The Slovak team tried to continue their ride at this championship by advancing to the final even though the Czech team was the favorite before the game started. The game started slow, but Miroslav Šatan broke the tie 15 minutes into the game to give Slovakia the lead. Another 15 minutes in, this time the second period, Michael Frolík made it a 1–1 game going into the last period. The third period was not more than one minute old, when Šatan struck again with his second goal, despite Slovakia being shorthanded. Libor Hudáček then gave Slovakia a two-goal lead four minutes later. The Czech team had 15 minutes to turn the game around but did not create enough opportunities. They pulled their goaltender with two minutes to go, but Slovakia kept up their defense well enough not to concede another goal. Slovakia finished off another upset and advanced to the final, while the Czech Republic plays in the bronze medal game. Slovakia had no penalties but was outshot by nine.

=== Bronze medal game ===
The bronze medal game featured Finland and the Czech Republic. The Czechs took the lead in the first period before Finland tied the game at one, three minutes before the first break. Jiří Novotný and David Krejčí raised the lead to two goals, being 3–1 at the first intermission. The second period went scoreless before the Finnish team got new hope when Jussi Jokinen scored a goal ten minutes before the end of the game. But they did not score again, and the Czech team captured the bronze medal and Finland ended the tournament in fourth place.

=== Gold medal game ===
The gold medal game featured Russia and Slovakia. Slovakia played in the World Championship final game for the first time since 2002, while Russia advanced to their fourth gold medal game in the last five years. Russia defeated Slovakia 6–2 to take home the gold medal from the tournament. The Russian team went through the tournament undefeated.

== Nations ==
The following 16 nations qualified for the elite-pool tournament. 13 nations from Europe, 2 nations from North America and 1 nation from Asia are represented.

Participating Nations of 2012 IIHF World Championship

Asia

- Kazakhstan (Note: Qualified through winning a promotion at the 2011 IIHF World Championship Division I)

Europe

- Belarus (Note: Automatic qualifier after a top 14 placement at the 2011 IIHF World Championship)
- Czech Republic
- Denmark
- Finland^{†}
- France
- Germany
- Italy
- Latvia
- Norway
- Russia
- Slovakia
- Sweden (Note: Qualified as hosts (and as automatic qualifier))
- Switzerland

North America

- Canada
- United States

== Officials ==
The IIHF selected 16 referees and 16 linesmen to work the 2012 IIHF World Championship. They were the following:

Referees

- (Slovakia) Vladimír Baluška
- (Finland) Antti Boman
- (Germany) Lars Brüggemann
- (Russia) Vyacheslav Bulanov
- (Czech Republic) Martin Fraňo
- (Germany) Georg Jablukov
- (Czech Republic) Antonín Jeřábek
- (Sweden) Morgan Johansson
- (United States) Keith Kaval
- (Switzerland) Danny Kurmann
- (Sweden) Christer Lärking
- (Finland) Jari Levonen
- (Canada) David Lewis
- (Russia) Konstantin Olenin
- (United States) Steve Patafie
- (Switzerland) Brent Reiber

Linesmen

- (Switzerland) Roger Arm
- (Czech Republic) Petr Blumel
- (Sweden) Jimmy Dahmen
- (Belarus) Ivan Dedioulia
- (France) Pierre Dehaen
- (Canada) François Dussureault
- (Norway) Jon Killian
- (United States) Jonathan Morisson
- (Finland) Masi Puolakka
- (Germany) Andre Schrader
- (Germany) Sirko Schulz
- (Estonia) Anton Semionov
- (Russia) Sergei Shelyanin
- (Finland) Sakari Suominen
- (Slovakia) Miroslav Valach
- (Canada) Jesse Wilmot

== Seeding and groups ==
The seeding in the preliminary round was based on the 2011 IIHF World Ranking, which ended at the conclusion of the 2011 IIHF World Championship. The teams were grouped accordingly by seeding (in parentheses is the corresponding world ranking):

Group H (Helsinki)

- Finland (2)
- Canada (4)
- United States (6)
- Switzerland (7)
- Slovakia (10)
- Belarus (11)
- France (14)
- Kazakhstan (16)

Group S (Stockholm)

- Russia (1)
- Sweden (3)
- Czech Republic (5)
- Germany (8)
- Norway (9)
- Latvia (12)
- Denmark (13)
- Italy (17)

== Preliminary round ==
The top four teams in each group moved to the quarterfinals where the group winner met the fourth place, and the group runner-up met the third place within the same group. The last placed team in each group was relegated to Division I, Group A.

=== Group H ===
Team	Pld	W	OTW	OTL	L	GF	GA	GD	Pts	Qualification or relegation
Canada	7	6	0	1	0	35	15	+20	19	Playoff Round
United States	7	4	2	0	1	32	17	+15	16	Playoff Round
Finland	7	5	0	0	2	21	14	+7	15	Playoff Round
Slovakia	7	5	0	0	2	21	13	+8	15	Playoff Round
France	7	3	0	0	4	21	32	−11	9	
Switzerland	7	2	0	0	5	16	21	−5	6	
Belarus	7	1	0	0	6	11	23	−12	3	
Kazakhstan	7	0	0	1	6	11	33	−22	1	Relegated to Division I A

Source: IIHF

All times are local (UTC+3).

4 May 2012; 12:15	United States	7–2 (1-1, 3–1, 3–0)	France	Hartwall Areena, Helsinki; Attendance: 8,402

Game reference

Jimmy Howard
Goalies
Cristobal Huet
Referees:
(Czech Republic) Martin Fraňo
(Czech Republic) Antonín Jeřábek
Linesmen:
(Czech Republic) Petr Blumel
(Germany) Andre Schrader

	0–1	12:17 – N. Besch (L. Meunier, Y. Auvitu)
K. Okposo (A. Goligoski, J. Faulk) – 16:52	1–1
J. Johnson (R. Lasch, J. Faulk) (PP) – 23:56	2–1
B. Ryan (M. Pacioretty, P. Stastny) (PP) – 29:15	3–1
	3–2	33:17 – P. Bellemare (S. Treille) (EA)
M. Pacioretty (P. Stastny, A. Goligoski) – 39:38	4–2
J. Slater (K. Palmieri) – 45:38	5–2
K. Okposo (C. Fowler, J. Faulk) – 51:00	6–2
J. Petry (M. Pacioretty, P. Stastny) (EA) – 57:41	7–2

6 min
Penalties
12 min
35
Shots
23

4 May 2012; 16:15	Canada	3–2 (1–0, 2–1, 0–1)	Slovakia	Hartwall Areena, Helsinki; Attendance: 6,400

Game reference

Cam Ward
Goalies
Peter Hamerlík
Referees:
(Germany) Lars Brüggemann
(Germany) Georg Jablukov
Linesmen:
(Sweden) Jimmy Dahmen
(Russia) Sergei Shelyanin

J. Benn (R. Getzlaf, D. Keith) – 14:21	1–0
	1–1	21:58 – T. Tatar (J. Mikúš)
J. Eberle (E. Kane) – 32:30	2–1
A. Ladd (R. O'Reilly, T. Purcell) – 35:21	3–1
	3–2	42:59 – M. Bartovič (M. Bližňák, M. Haščák)

2 min
Penalties
4 min
30
Shots
22

4 May 2012; 20:15	Belarus	0–1 (0–1, 0–0, 0–0)	Finland	Hartwall Areena, Helsinki; Attendance: 12,354

Game reference
Vitali Koval	Goalies	Kari Lehtonen	Referees: (Sweden) Morgan Johansson (Sweden) Christer Lärking; Linesmen: (Germany) Sirko Schulz (Canada) Jesse Wilmot
0–1 / 19:18 – J. Niskala (M. Koivu, M. Granlund)			Referees: (Sweden) Morgan Johansson (Sweden) Christer Lärking; Linesmen: (Germany) Sirko Schulz (Canada) Jesse Wilmot
14 min	Penalties	8 min	Referees: (Sweden) Morgan Johansson (Sweden) Christer Lärking; Linesmen: (Germany) Sirko Schulz (Canada) Jesse Wilmot
21	Shots	38	Referees: (Sweden) Morgan Johansson (Sweden) Christer Lärking; Linesmen: (Germany) Sirko Schulz (Canada) Jesse Wilmot

5 May 2012; 15:00	Switzerland	5–1 (2–0, 3–1, 0–0)	Kazakhstan	Hartwall Areena, Helsinki; Attendance: 7,221

Game reference

Reto Berra
Goalies
Vitaly Kolesnik
Alexei Ivanov
Referees:
(Germany) Lars Brüggemann
(Sweden) Morgan Johansson
Linesmen:
(Norway) Jon Killan
(Germany) Andre Schrader

I. Rüthemann (D. Hollenstein) – 09:48	1–0
M. Streit (R. Wick, S. Blindenbacher) (PP) – 11:04	2–0
	2–1	21:36 – R. Savchenko (R. Starchenko)
M. Streit (S. Blindenbacher) (PP2) – 24:04	3–1
I. Rüthemann (D. Hollenstein, M. Streit) (PP) – 32:08	4–1
F. Du Bois (I. Rüthemann, M. Bieber) – 36:53	5–1

8 min
Penalties
14 min
48
Shots
20

5 May 2012; 19:00	Canada	4–5 OT (1–1, 1–1, 2–2) (OT 0–1)	United States	Hartwall Areena, Helsinki; Attendance: 6,842

Game reference

Cam Ward
Goalies
Jimmy Howard
Referees:
(Russia) Vyacheslav Bulanov
(Russia) Konstantin Olenin
Linesmen:
(Czech Republic) Petr Blumel
(Russia) Sergei Shelyanin

	0–1	01:10 – J. Slater (R. Lasch)
J. Tavares (D. Keith) – 06:38	1–1
J. Skinner (J. Tavares, J. Bouwmeester) – 27:34	2–1
	2–2	33:54 – J. Johnson (M. Pacioretty, B. Ryan) (PP)
	2–3	46:43 – P. Dwyer (SH)
E. Kane – 49:51	3–3
	3–4	56:19 – N. Thompson (J. Crabb, P. Dwyer)
D. Keith – 58:21	4–4
	4–5	61:47 – J. Johnson

8 min
Penalties
6 min
34
Shots
46

6 May 2012; 12:15	France	6–3 (3–1, 1–1, 2–1)	Kazakhstan	Hartwall Areena, Helsinki; Attendance: 8,673

Game reference

Cristobal Huet
Goalies
Alexei Ivanov
Vitaliy Yeremeyev
Referees:
(Czech Republic) Martin Fraňo
(Sweden) Christer Lärking
Linesmen:
(Norway) Jon Killan
(Germany) Sirko Schulz

K. Hecquefeuille (L. Meunier, J. Desrosiers) – 08:59	1–0
N. Besch (L. Meunier) – 11:27	2–0
S. Treille (S. Da Costa, P. Bellemare) – 14:53	3–0
	3–1	17:13 – V. Krasnoslobodtsev (D. Dudarev, R. Starchenko)
J. Desrosiers (Y. Treille, L. Meunier) – 27:49	4–1
	4–2	33:16 – F. Polishchuk (A. Troschinsky, R. Savchenko)
	4–3	40:42 – T. Zhailauov (D. Dudarev, V. Novopashin)
P. Bellemare (A. Guttig, S. Da Costa) – 51:02	5–3
K. Hecquefeuille (J. Desrosiers, Y. Auvitu) – 56:14	6–3

39 min
Penalties
24 min
41
Shots
23

6 May 2012; 16:15	Finland	1–0 (1–0, 0–0, 0–0)	Slovakia	Hartwall Areena, Helsinki; Attendance: 12,855

Game reference
Petri Vehanen	Goalies	Ján Laco	Referees: (Russia) Vyacheslav Bulanov (Russia) Konstantin Olenin; Linesmen: (Sweden) Jimmy Dahmen (Canada) Jesse Wilmot
J. Pesonen (M. Granlund, J. Immonen) (EA) – 07:32 / 1–0			Referees: (Russia) Vyacheslav Bulanov (Russia) Konstantin Olenin; Linesmen: (Sweden) Jimmy Dahmen (Canada) Jesse Wilmot
4 min	Penalties	10 min	Referees: (Russia) Vyacheslav Bulanov (Russia) Konstantin Olenin; Linesmen: (Sweden) Jimmy Dahmen (Canada) Jesse Wilmot
22	Shots	26	Referees: (Russia) Vyacheslav Bulanov (Russia) Konstantin Olenin; Linesmen: (Sweden) Jimmy Dahmen (Canada) Jesse Wilmot

6 May 2012; 20:15	Switzerland	3–2 (2–1, 0–1, 1–0)	Belarus	Hartwall Areena, Helsinki; Attendance: 5,249

Game reference

Tobias Stephan
Goalies
Vitali Koval
Referees:
(Germany) Georg Jablukov
(Czech Republic) Antonín Jeřábek
Linesmen:
(Finland) Masi Puolakka
(Germany) Andre Schrader

S. Moser (F. Du Bois) – 06:55	1–0
	1–1	10:26 – A. Ugarov (A. Stepanov, V. Denisov)
S. Moser (K. Romy, D. Brunner) – 11:57	2–1
	2–2	21:34 – K. Koltsov (D. Korobov, A. Kalyuzhny)
K. Romy (D. Brunner) – 47:48	3–2

6 min
Penalties
6 min
35
Shots
21

7 May 2012; 16:15	France	2–7 (1–4, 1–1, 0–2)	Canada	Hartwall Areena, Helsinki; Attendance: 3,415

Game reference

Fabrice Lhenry
Goalies
Devan Dubnyk
Referees:
(Germany) Lars Brüggemann
(Germany) Georg Jablukov
Linesmen:
(Czech Republic) Petr Blumel
(Sweden) Jimmy Dahmen

	0–1	01:59 – R. Nugent-Hopkins (P. Sharp, J. Benn)
	0–2	09:56 – P. Sharp (J. Tavares, R. Nugent-Hopkins) (PP)
	0–3	13:54 – J. Benn (P. Sharp, L. Schenn)
	0–4	17:21 – J. Benn (C. Perry)
B. Henderson – 19:22	1–4
	1–5	33:19 – J. Eberle (P. Sharp, D. Keith (PP)
A. Rouleau (A. Roussel) – 33:49	2–5
	2–6	49:56 – R. Nugent-Hopkins (P. Sharp, M. Methot)
	2–7	52:19 – C. Perry (R. Getzlaf, E. Kane)

6 min
Penalties
4 min
21
Shots
37

7 May 2012; 20:15	United States	2–4 (1–3, 1–0, 0–1)	Slovakia	Hartwall Areena, Helsinki; Attendance: 3,948

Game reference

Jimmy Howard
Goalies
Ján Laco
Referees:
(Sweden) Morgan Johansson
(Sweden) Christer Lärking
Linesmen:
(Finland) Masi Puolakka
(Russia) Sergei Shelyanin

	0–1	00:47 – D. Graňák (L. Hudáček)
	0–2	15:04 – B. Radivojevič (T. Kopecký, M. Handzuš)
J. Faulk (K. Okposo, J. Slater) – 15:41	1–2
	1–3	19:54 – A. Sekera (M. Bližňák)
P. Stastny (M. Pacioretty, C. Fowler) (PP2) – 38:47	2–3
	2–4	59:23 – M. Šatan (ENG)

6 min
Penalties
6 min
20
Shots
32

8 May 2012; 16:15	Belarus	3–2 (0–1, 3–1, 0–0)	Kazakhstan	Hartwall Areena, Helsinki; Attendance: 3,221

Game reference

Andrei Mezin
Goalies
Vitaliy Yeremeyev
Referees:
(Czech Republic) Martin Fraňo
(Finland) Jari Levonen
Linesmen:
(Norway) Jon Killian
(Canada) Jesse Wilmot

	0–1	02:32 – V. Krasnoslobodtsev
	0–2	27:42 – V. Krasnoslobodtsev (D. Dudarev, V. Yeremeyev)
K. Koltsov (SH) – 28:48	1–2
M. Grabovski (R. Graborenko) – 33:37	2–2
E. Kovyrshin – 33:52	3–2

12 min
Penalties
6 min
32
Shots
30

8 May 2012; 20:15	Finland	5–2 (1–0, 2–2, 2–0)	Switzerland	Hartwall Areena, Helsinki; Attendance: 12,448

Game reference

Kari Lehtonen
Goalies
Reto Berra
Referees:
(Czech Republic) Antonín Jeřábek
(Canada) David Lewis
Linesmen:
(Germany) Andre Schrader
(Germany) Sirko Schulz

J. Immonen (J. Niskala, A. Salmela) (PP) – 06:30	1–0
	1–1	25:44 – A. Ambühl (L. Sbisa)
L. Komarov (J. Järvinen, J. Joensuu) – 26:05	2–1
J. Immonen (J. Pesonen, M. Granlund) – 36:45	3–1
	3–2	37:44 – R. Wick (M. Streit) (PP)
V. Filppula (J. Jokinen, J. Hietanen (PP) – 49:46	4–2
V. Filppula (O. Väänänen, J. Jokinen) – 51.56	5–2

18 min
Penalties
10 min
26
Shots
28

9 May 2012; 16:15	Slovakia	4–2 (1–1, 1–0, 2–1)	Kazakhstan	Hartwall Areena, Helsinki; Attendance: 3,706

Game reference

Ján Laco
Goalies
Vitali Yeremeyev
Referees:
(Germany) Georg Jablukov
(Czech Republic) Antonín Jeřábek
Linesmen:
(Sweden) Jimmy Dahmen
(Russia) Sergei Shelyanin

D. Graňák (M. Šatan, L. Hudáček) – 01:08	1–0
	1–1	11:18 – Y. Rymarev (V. Novopashin, D. Shemelin)
L.Hudáček (D. Graňák, Z. Chára)(PP) – 37:49	2–1
	2–2	43:15 – K. Pushkarev (T. Zhailauov, D. Upper)
T. Kopecký (I. Baranka, A. Sekera) – 48:18	3–2
T. Kopecký (M. Handzuš, B. Radivojevič)(PP) – 59:46	4–2

4 min
Penalties
8 min
33
Shots
22

9 May 2012; 20:15	Canada	3–2 (0–1, 1–0, 2–1)	Switzerland	Hartwall Areena, Helsinki; Attendance: 4,829

Game reference

Cam Ward
Goalies
Tobias Stephan
Referees:
(Czech Republic) Martin Fraňo
(Finland) Jari Levonen
Linesmen:
(Czech Republic) Petr Blumel
(Finland) Masi Puolakka

	0–1	01:40 – D. Brunner (G. Bezina, K. Romy)
J. Tavares (J. Eberle, J. Skinner) – 20:35	1–1
J. Eberle (J. Tavares) – 40:41	2–1
	2–2	43:49 – G. Bezina (K. Romy, D. Brunner) (PP)
R. Getzlaf (C. Ward) – 48:02	3–2

6 min
Penalties
8 min
30
Shots
30

10 May 2012; 16:15	United States	5–3 (2–1, 1–1, 2–1)	Belarus	Hartwall Areena, Helsinki; Attendance: 7,441

Game reference

Jimmy Howard
Goalies
Andrei Mezin
Vitali Koval
Referees:
(Germany) Georg Jablukov
(Canada) David Lewis
Linesmen:
(Germany) Sirko Schulz
(Canada) Jesse Wilmot

J. Abdelkader (J. T. Brown, J. Petry) – 01:39	1–0
J. Atkinson (J. Abdelkader) – 06:31	2–0
	2–1	16:15 – A. Kalyuzhny (D. Korobov, M. Grabovski)
	2–2	22:50 – A. Ugarov (M. Grabovski, E. Kovyrshin) (PP)
N. Thompson (P. Dwyer, J. Crabb) – 38:21	3–2
B. Ryan (M. Pacioretty, C. Fowler) – 52:10	4–2
P. Stastny (M. Pacioretty, J. Johnson) – 55:34	5–2
	5–3	59:50 – E. Kovyrshin (M. Grabovski, A. Kalyuzhny) (PP2, EA)

22 min
Penalties
16 min
36
Shots
26

10 May 2012; 20:15	France	1–7 (0–1, 0–4, 1–2)	Finland	Hartwall Areena, Helsinki; Attendance: 12,957

Game reference

Fabrice Lhenry
Goalies
Petri Vehanen
Referees:
(United States) Steve Patafie
(Switzerland) Brent Reiber
Linesmen:
(Norway) Jon Killian
(Germany) Andre Schrader

	0–1	10:12 – J. Immonen (J. Pesonen, M. Granlund) (PP)
	0–2	30:00 – M. Koivu (J. Hietanen, V. Filppula)
	0–3	33:49 – J. Jokinen (M. Mäenpää, M. Koivu) (PP)
	0–4	37:12 – J. Niskala (J. Joensuu, V. Filppula)
	0–5	38:08 – N. Kapanen (J. Tuppurainen)
A. Guttig (S. Da Costa, T. Da Costa) (PP) – 43:34	1–5
	1–6	44:01 – J. Jokinen (M. Koivu, V. Filppula) (PP)
	1–7	50:00 – J. Hietanen (M. Mäenpää, M. Koivu) (PP)

14 min
Penalties
12 min
18
Shots
37

11 May 2012; 16:15	Kazakhstan	2–3 OT (0–0, 1–1, 1–1) (OT 0–1)	United States	Hartwall Areena, Helsinki; Attendance: 9,856

Game reference

Vitaly Kolesnik
Goalies
Richard Bachman
Referees:
(Finland) Jari Levonen
(Canada) David Lewis
Linesmen:
(Czech Republic) Petr Blumel
(Germany) Andre Schrader

	0–1	34:12 – J. Brown (J. Abdelkader)
K. Pushkarev (T. Zhailauov, D. Upper) – 38:17	1–1
	1–2	44:58 – J. Faulk (A. Goligoski)
T. Zhailauov (K. Pushkarev, V. Novopashin) – 55:54	2–2
	2–3	64:38 – J. Faulk (M. Pacioretty, P. Stastny)

2 min
Penalties
4 min
19
Shots
50

11 May 2012; 20:15	Finland	3–5 (2–0, 1–3, 0–2)	Canada	Hartwall Areena, Helsinki; Attendance: 13,059

Game reference

Kari Lehtonen
Goalies
Cam Ward
Referees:
(Czech Republic) Martin Fraňo
(Sweden) Christer Lärking
Linesmen:
(Sweden) Jimmy Dahmen
(Russia) Sergei Shelyanin

A. Pihlström (N. Kapanen) – 05:53	1–0
M. Koivu (J. Jokinen) (PP) – 10:31	2–0
	2–1	25:34 – A. Burrows (R. O'Reilly, M. Methot)
J. Jokinen (A. Salmela) (PP) – 27:36	3–1
	3–2	34:31 – J. Tavares (J. Skinner, K. Russell)
	3–3	38:18 – J. Skinner (R. Nugent-Hopkins, D. Keith)
	3–4	46:04 – E. Kane (C. Perry)
	3–5	59:36 – J. Eberle (J. Tavares, D. Keith) (ENG)

4 min
Penalties
12 min
38
Shots
26

12 May 2012; 12:15	Slovakia	5–1 (1–0, 4–1, 0–0)	Belarus	Hartwall Areena, Helsinki; Attendance: 9,032

Game reference

Ján Laco
Goalies
Vitali Koval
Referees:
(Finland) Jari Levonen
(Switzerland) Brent Reiber
Linesmen:
(Norway) Jon Killian
(Finland) Masi Puolakka

A. Sekera (I. Baranka, M. Handzuš) – 06:45	1–0
B. Radivojevič (A. Sekera) – 23:16	2–0
M. Miklík (J. Mikúš, T. Tatar) – 24:58	3–0
T. Kopecký (B. Radivojevič) – 25:48	4–0
J. Mikúš (T. Tatar, M. Miklík) – 26:56	5–0
	5–1	34:56 – A. Kalyuzhny (A. Kostitsyn, S. Kostitsyn) (PP)

18 min
Penalties
8 min
40
Shots
31

12 May 2012; 16:15	Switzerland	2–4 (0–1, 2–1, 0–2)	France	Hartwall Areena, Helsinki; Attendance: 9,155

Game reference

Tobias Stephan
Goalies
Cristobal Huet
Referees:
(Germany) Georg Jablukov
(Sweden) Christer Lärking
Linesmen:
(Russia) Sergei Shelyanin
(Canada) Jesse Wilmot

	0–1	17:11 – Y. Auvitu (K. Hecquefeuille, L. Meunier) (PP)
	0–2	32:44 – T. Da Costa (C. Bertrand, A. Roussel)
D. Brunner (P. Furrer, S. Blindenbacher) – 33:14	1–2
D. Brunner (K. Romy) – 35:04	2–2
	2–3	46:21 – L. Meunier (PP)
	2–4	47:05 – S. Da Costa (P. Bellemare, B. Amar) (PP)

31 min
Penalties
10 min
43
Shots
27

12 May 2012; 20:15	Kazakhstan	0–8 (0–1, 0–2, 0–5)	Canada	Hartwall Areena, Helsinki; Attendance: 4,151

Game reference

Vitaly Kolesnik
Vitaliy Yeremeyev
Goalies
Devan Dubnyk
Referees:
(Czech Republic) Antonín Jeřábek
(United States) Steve Patafie
Linesmen:
(Sweden) Jimmy Dahmen
(Germany) Sirko Schulz

0–1	15:45 – D. Phaneuf (R. Getzlaf) (PP)
0–2	32:05 – C. Perry (D. Keith, J. Bouwmeester)
0–3	37:03 – A. Burrows (J. Eberle, D. Keith) (SH)
0–4	42:57 – E. Kane (C. Perry, R. Getzlaf)
0–5	43:39 – J. Tavares (J. Eberle, K. Russell)
0–6	43:47 – T. Purcell (J. Benn)
0–7	45:53 – D. Phaneuf (R. Getzlaf, D. Keith)
0–8	56:13 – R. Nugent-Hopkins (P. Sharp, A. Ladd)

8 min
Penalties
10 min
24
Shots
58

13 May 2012; 16:15	Finland	0–5 (0–1, 0–2, 0–2)	United States	Hartwall Areena, Helsinki; Attendance: 12,652

Game reference

Kari Lehtonen
Goalies
Jimmy Howard
Referees:
(Germany) Georg Jablukov
(Switzerland) Brent Reiber
Linesmen:
(Czech Republic) Petr Blumel
(Canada) Jesse Wilmot

0–1	16:19 – M. Pacioretty
0–2	35:33 – K. Palmieri (C. Atkinson, C. Butler)
0–3	37:56 – J. Faulk (A. Goligoski, M. Pacioretty) (PP)
0–4	42:12 – C. Butler (J. Petry, C. Atkinson)
0–5	44:08 – B. Ryan (C. Smith)

39 min
Penalties
6 min
18
Shots
31

13 May 2012; 20:15	Switzerland	0–1 (0–1, 0–0, 0–0)	Slovakia	Hartwall Areena, Helsinki; Attendance: 4,257

Game reference
Reto Berra	Goalies	Ján Laco	Referees: (Canada) David Lewis (United States) Steve Patafie; Linesmen: (Finland) Masi Puolakka (Germany) Andre Schrader
0–1 / 18:13 – T. Tatar (J. Mikúš, M. Miklík)			Referees: (Canada) David Lewis (United States) Steve Patafie; Linesmen: (Finland) Masi Puolakka (Germany) Andre Schrader
4 min	Penalties	2 min	Referees: (Canada) David Lewis (United States) Steve Patafie; Linesmen: (Finland) Masi Puolakka (Germany) Andre Schrader
21	Shots	30	Referees: (Canada) David Lewis (United States) Steve Patafie; Linesmen: (Finland) Masi Puolakka (Germany) Andre Schrader

14 May 2012; 16:15	Belarus	1–2 (1–0, 0–1, 0–1)	France	Hartwall Areena, Helsinki; Attendance: 5,583

Game reference

Vitali Koval
Dmitri Milchakov
Goalies
Cristobal Huet
Referees:
(Czech Republic) Martin Fraňo
(Finland) Jari Levonen
Linesmen:
(Norway) Jon Killian
(Germany) Sirko Schulz

A. Kalyuzhny (A. Ugarov, D. Korobov) – 08:15	1–0
	1–1	37:57 – K. Hecquefeuille (V. Bachet, P. Bellemare)
	1–2	58:43 – Y. Auvitu (P. Bellemare, S. Da Costa)

6 min
Penalties
10 min
22
Shots
32

14 May 2012; 20:15	Kazakhstan	1–4 (0–0, 0–3, 1–1)	Finland	Hartwall Areena, Helsinki; Attendance: 12,443

Game reference

Vitaly Kolesnik
Goalies
Petri Vehanen
Referees:
(Czech Republic) Antonín Jeřábek
(Sweden) Christer Lärking
Linesmen:
(Czech Republic) Petr Blumel
(Sweden) Jimmy Dahmen

	0–1	24:02 – J. Jokinen (M. Mäenpää, V. Filppula) (PP)
	0–2	31:38 – M. Mäenpää (J. Hietanen, V. Filppula) (PP2)
	0–3	37:43 – V. Filppula (T. Kiiskinen, M. Koivu)
	0–4	41:15 – V. Filppula (M. Koivu, J. Hietanen) (PP)
K. Pushkarev (D. Upper, V. Novopashin) (PP) – 49:03	1–4

18 min
Penalties
10 min
18
Shots
48

15 May 2012; 12:15	Canada	5–1 (1–1, 3–0, 1–0)	Belarus	Hartwall Areena, Helsinki; Attendance: 9,140

Game reference

Cam Ward
Goalies
Dmitri Milchakov
Referees:
(Germany) Georg Jablukov
(United States) Steve Patafie
Linesmen:
(Finland) Masi Puolakka
(Germany) Andre Schrader

R. O'Reilly (A. Ladd, D. Keith) – 02:16	1–0
	1–1	14:25 – S. Kostitsyn (E. Kovyrshin, A. Kostitsyn)
C. Perry (R. Getzlaf, D. Keith) – 29:10	2–1
R. Getzlaf (E. Kane, C. Perry) – 32:46	3–1
R. Nugent-Hopkins (J. Tavares, P. Sharp) – 34:11	4–1
R. O'Reilly (A. Ladd) – 48:16	5–1

58 min
Penalties
45 min
28
Shots
18

15 May 2012; 15:15	Slovakia	5–4 (2–2, 1–1, 2–1)	France	Hartwall Areena, Helsinki; Attendance: 7,481

Game reference

Ján Laco
Goalies
Cristobal Huet
Referees:
(Czech Republic) Antonín Jeřábek
(Switzerland) Brent Reiber
Linesmen:
(Germany) Sirko Schulz
(Canada) Jesse Wilmot

M. Bartovič (M. Bližňák, A. Sekera) – 02:36	1–0
T. Kopecký (B. Radivojevič) – 06:50	2–0
	2–1	07:11 – Y. Treille (A. Rouleau, J. Desrosiers)
	2–2	15:00 – T. Da Costa
M. Handzuš (Z. Chára, A. Sekera) (PP) – 35:26	3–2
	3–3	39:21 – D. Fleury (L. Meunier)
B. Radivojevič – 40:39	4–3
	4–4	45:17 – A. Roussel (S. Da Costa)
B. Radivojevič (A. Sekera) (PP) – 50:27	5–4

4 min
Penalties
20 min
29
Shots
28

15 May 2012; 20:15	United States	5–2 (0–0, 2–1, 3–1)	Switzerland	Hartwall Areena, Helsinki; Attendance: 9,212

Game reference

Jimmy Howard
Goalies
Reto Berra
Referees:
(Czech Republic) Martin Fraňo
(Sweden) Christer Lärking
Linesmen:
(Norway) Jon Killian
(Russia) Sergei Shelyanin

	0–1	20:21 – I. Rüthemann (D. Brunner, K. Romy)
B. Ryan (M. Pacioretty, C. Fowler) – 22:39	1–1
C. Fowler (P. Stastny) – 36:52	2–1
P. Stastny (B. Ryan, M. Pacioretty) (PP) – 45:22	3–1
A. Goligoski (J. Abdelkader, K. Palmieri) – 26:04	4–1
	4–2	54:43 – M. Trachsler (B. Plüss, R. Josi)
J. Petry (P. Stastny) – 54:59	5–2

10 min
Penalties
8 min
24
Shots
27

=== Group S ===
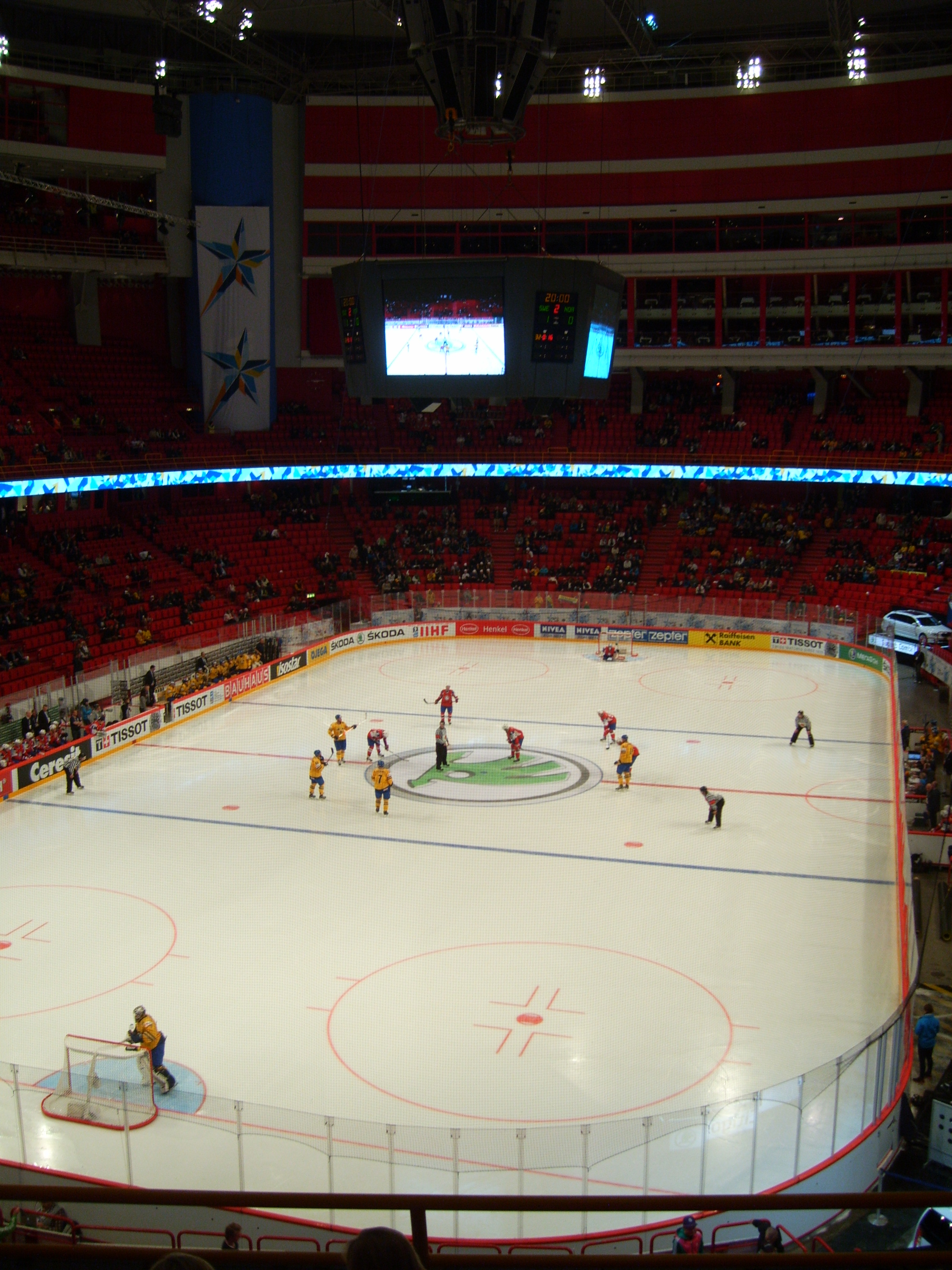
Game between Sweden and Norway at Ericsson Globe.

Team	Pld	W	OTW	OTL	L	GF	GA	GD	Pts	Qualification or relegation
Russia	7	7	0	0	0	27	8	+19	21	Playoff Round
Sweden	7	6	0	0	1	29	15	+14	18	Playoff Round
Czech Republic	7	4	1	0	2	24	11	+13	14	Playoff Round
Norway	7	4	0	1	2	33	19	+14	13	Playoff Round
Latvia	7	2	0	0	5	11	19	−8	6	
Germany	7	2	0	0	5	14	31	−17	6	
Denmark	7	1	0	1	5	13	23	−10	4	
Italy	7	0	1	0	6	6	31	−25	2	Relegated to Division I A

Source: IIHF

All times are local (UTC+2).

4 May 2012; 12:15	Germany	3–0 (1–0, 1–0, 1–0)	Italy	Ericsson Globe, Stockholm; Attendance: 1,033

Game reference

Dennis Endras
Goalies
Daniel Bellissimo
Referees:
(Switzerland) Danny Kurmann
(United States) Steve Patafie
Linesmen:
(France) Pierre Dehaen
(Canada) François Dussureault

C. Schubert (C. Ullmann) – 16:16	1–0
P. Reimer (C. Ullmann, P. Gogulla) – 22:42	2–0
C. Fischer (P. Gogulla, C. Ullmann) (PP) – 45:11	3–0

6 min
Penalties
10 min
46
Shots
22

4 May 2012; 16:15	Czech Republic	2–0 (0–0, 1–0, 1–0)	Denmark	Ericsson Globe, Stockholm; Attendance: 1,610

Game reference
Jakub Kovář	Goalies	Frederik Andersen	Referees: (United States) Keith Kaval (Canada) David Lewis; Linesmen: (United States) Jonathan Morisson (Finland) Sakari Suominen
A. Hemský (P. Nedvěd, T. Plekanec) – 39:55 / 1–0; P. Tenkrát (M. Frolík, T. Plekanec) – 57:21 / 2–0			Referees: (United States) Keith Kaval (Canada) David Lewis; Linesmen: (United States) Jonathan Morisson (Finland) Sakari Suominen
8 min	Penalties	8 min	Referees: (United States) Keith Kaval (Canada) David Lewis; Linesmen: (United States) Jonathan Morisson (Finland) Sakari Suominen
24	Shots	26	Referees: (United States) Keith Kaval (Canada) David Lewis; Linesmen: (United States) Jonathan Morisson (Finland) Sakari Suominen

4 May 2012; 20:15	Sweden	3–1 (1–0, 1–1, 1–0)	Norway	Ericsson Globe, Stockholm; Attendance: 7,770

Game reference

Jhonas Enroth
Goalies
Lars Haugen
Referees:
(Slovakia) Vladimír Baluška
(Switzerland) Brent Reiber
Linesmen:
(Estonia) Anton Semionov
(Slovakia) Miroslav Valach

J. Silfverberg (E. Karlsson, C. Järnkrok) (PP) – 16:48	1–0
	1–1	20:20 – M. Hansen (P.-Å. Skrøder)
M. Krüger (N. Hjalmarsson, D. Alfredsson) – 22:29	2–1
L. Eriksson (H. Zetterberg, D. Alfredsson) – 44:18	3–1

18 min
Penalties
16 min
44
Shots
20

5 May 2012; 16:15	Latvia	2–5 (1–0, 0–2, 1–3)	Russia	Ericsson Globe, Stockholm; Attendance: 5,219

Game reference

Edgars Masaļskis
Goalies
Semyon Varlamov
Referees:
(United States) Keith Kaval
(Canada) David Lewis
Linesmen:
(Canada) François Dussureault
(Finland) Sakari Suominen

M. Indrašis (G. Galviņš, J. Sprukts) – 11:32	1–0
	1–1	33:45 – I. Nikulin (A. Perezhogin, E. Malkin) (PP)
	1–2	36:29 – E. Malkin (I. Nikulin) (PP)
	1–3	45:03 – E. Malkin (A. Popov)
	1–4	50:53 – A. Popov (A. Perezhogin, I. Nikulin)
M. Cipulis (G. Pujacs, O. Bārtulis) – 55:21	2–4
	2–5	56:53 – E. Kuznetsov (N. Kulemin)

6 min
Penalties
8 min
26
Shots
40

5 May 2012; 20:15	Sweden	4–1 (1–0, 1–0, 2–1)	Czech Republic	Ericsson Globe, Stockholm; Attendance: 10,076

Game reference

Viktor Fasth
Goalies
Jakub Štěpánek
Referees:
(Finland) Antti Boman
(Finland) Jari Levonen
Linesmen:
(Switzerland) Roger Arm
(Belarus) Ivan Dedioulia

J. Franzén (L. Eriksson, H. Zetterberg) – 02:42	1–0
N. Kronwall (H. Zetterberg) – 20:50	2–0
	2–1	43:44 – J. Petružálek (A. Hemský)
J. Lundqvist (N. Persson, J. Larsson) – 50:24	3–1
N. Persson (V. Hedman, J. Lundqvist) (ENG) – 58:04	4–1

8 min
Penalties
6 min
20
Shots
17

6 May 2012; 12:15	Denmark	3–4 OT (0–2, 3–1, 0–0) (OT 0–1)	Italy	Ericsson Globe, Stockholm; Attendance: 2,878

Game reference

Frederik Andersen
Goalies
Daniel Bellissimo
Referees:
(Slovakia) Vladimír Baluška
(Finland) Antti Boman
Linesmen:
(Belarus) Ivan Dedioulia
(Slovakia) Miroslav Valach

	0–1	14:12 – L. Ansoldi (G. Scandella)
	0–2	14:30 – M. de Marchi (N. Fontanive)
L. Eller (F. Nielsen, J. Jensen) – 20:14	1–2
J. Jensen (M. Green, D. Nielsen) – 24:42	2–2
J. Jensen – 31:53	3–2
	3–3	33:56 – M. de Marchi (G. Scandella, N. Plastino)
	3–4	60:52 – G. Scandella

6 min
Penalties
8 min
35
Shots
24

6 May 2012; 16:15	Russia	4–2 (0–0, 3–2, 1–0)	Norway	Ericsson Globe, Stockholm; Attendance: 4,438

Game reference

Semyon Varlamov
Goalies
Lars Volden
Referees:
(Switzerland) Danny Kurmann
(United States) Steve Patafie
Linesmen:
(Switzerland) Roger Arm
(United States) Jonathan Morisson

E. Kuznetsov (D. Kalinin, A. Emelin) (PP) – 21:21	1–0
D. Denisov (Y. Medvedev, E. Kuznetsov) – 27:01	2–0
	2–1	30:34 – M. Ask (J. Holøs, P. Thoresen) (PP2)
N. Kulemin (E. Malkin) – 32:46	3–1
	3–2	35:52 – M. Holtet (P. Skrøder, J. Holøs) (PP)
A. Perezhogin (E. Malkin) – 40:40	4–2

8 min
Penalties
10 min
46
Shots
21

6 May 2012; 20:15	Germany	2–3 (0–1, 2–1, 0–1)	Latvia	Ericsson Globe, Stockholm; Attendance: 4,162

Game reference

Dennis Endras
Goalies
Edgars Masaļskis
Referees:
(Finland) Jari Levonen
(Switzerland) Brent Reiber
Linesmen:
(France) Pierre Dehaen
(Estonia) Anton Semionov

	0–1	11:09 – M. Indrašis (J. Sprukts, G. Galviņš)
	0–2	23:10 – M. Rēdlihs (J. Sprukts, M. Indrašis)
J. Tripp (K. Hospelt, K. Lavallee) – 24:58	1–2
K. Hospelt (P. Reimer, P. Gogulla) – 32:03	2–2
	2–3	52:15 – A. Širokovs (K. Daugaviņš) (PP)

6 min
Penalties
0 min
37
Shots
27

7 May 2012; 16:15	Czech Republic	4–3 GWS (1–1, 1–1, 1–1) (OT 0–0) (SO: 1–0)	Norway	Ericsson Globe, Stockholm; Attendance: 3,383

Game reference

Jakub Kovář
Goalies
Lars Haugen
Referees:
(Canada) David Lewis
(Switzerland) Brent Reiber
Linesmen:
(France) Pierre Dehaen
(Canada) François Dussureault

	0–1	11:16 – M. Olimb (J. Holøs, M. Ask) (PP2)
A. Hemský (P. Nedvěd) – 16:41	1–1
	1–2	21:39 – L. Spets (A. Bastiansen, M. Olimb)
D. Krejčí (P. Tenkrát) – 37:04	2–2
M. Frolík (T. Plekanec, M. Michálek) – 47:56	3–2
	3–3	50:51 – J. Holøs (A. Bonsaksen, P. Thoresen)

A. Hemský
P. Nedvěd (miss)
D. Krejčí (miss)
Shootout
(miss) P. Skrøder
(miss) P. Thoresen
(miss) M. Ask
8 min
Penalties
4 min
31
Shots
31

7 May 2012; 20:15	Denmark	4–6 (1–4, 1–2, 2–0)	Sweden	Ericsson Globe, Stockholm; Attendance: 8,119

Game reference

Frederik Andersen
Goalies
Jhonas Enroth
Referees:
(United States) Keith Kaval
(United States) Steve Patafie
Linesmen:
(Finland) Sakari Suominen
(Slovakia) Miroslav Valach

	0–1	02:06 – V. Stålberg (M. Krüger, N. Hjalmarsson)
	0–2	06:06 – L. Eriksson (J. Franzén) (PP)
	0–3	11:05 – L. Eriksson (H. Zetterberg, J. Franzén) (PP)
	0–4	11:43 – V. Stålberg (M. Krüger, G. Landeskog)
N. Hardt (J. Hansen, P. Larsen) (PP2) – 18:27	1–4
	1–5	20:43 – D. Alfredsson (L. Eriksson, S. Kronwall)
	1–6	29:16 – H. Zetterberg (S. Kronwall, J. Franzén)
N. Hardt (F. Nielsen, L. Eller) (PP) – 38:47	2–6
L. Eller (N. Hardt, F. Nielsen) – 40:21	3–6
M. Green (J. Hansen, D. Nielsen) – 51:27	4–6

10 min
Penalties
12 min
18
Shots
42

8 May 2012; 16:15	Latvia	5–0 (1–0, 2–0, 2–0)	Italy	Ericsson Globe, Stockholm; Attendance: 2,785

Game reference

Edgars Masaļskis
Goalies
Daniel Bellissimo
Thomas Tragust
Referees:
(United States) Keith Kaval
(Russia) Konstantin Olenin
Linesmen:
(United States) Jonathan Morisson
(Finland) Sakari Suominen

R. Ķēniņš (A. Bērziņš) – 18:24	1–0
G. Meija (R. Ķēniņš, O. Bārtulis) – 24:16	2–0
O. Bārtulis (M. Cipulis) – 37:54	3–0
M. Indrašis (J. Sprukts, G. Galviņš) – 40:43	4–0
K. Rēdlihs (PP) – 42:31	5–0

4 min
Penalties
14 min
35
Shots
23

8 May 2012; 20:15	Russia	2–0 (1–0, 0–0, 1–0)	Germany	Ericsson Globe, Stockholm; Attendance: 2,897

Game reference
Semyon Varlamov	Goalies	Dimitri Kotschnew	Referees: (Slovakia) Vladimír Baluška (Finland) Antti Boman; Linesmen: (Belarus) Ivan Dedioulia (Canada) François Dussureault
N. Zherdev (Y. Medvedev, Y. Malkin) – 19:51 / 1–0; A. Tereshchenko (S. Shirokov, N. Zherdev) – 50:35 / 2–0			Referees: (Slovakia) Vladimír Baluška (Finland) Antti Boman; Linesmen: (Belarus) Ivan Dedioulia (Canada) François Dussureault
10 min	Penalties	10 min	Referees: (Slovakia) Vladimír Baluška (Finland) Antti Boman; Linesmen: (Belarus) Ivan Dedioulia (Canada) François Dussureault
26	Shots	30	Referees: (Slovakia) Vladimír Baluška (Finland) Antti Boman; Linesmen: (Belarus) Ivan Dedioulia (Canada) François Dussureault

9 May 2012; 16:15	Norway	6–2 (2–1, 2–1, 2–0)	Italy	Ericsson Globe, Stockholm; Attendance: 1,357

Game reference

Lars Haugen
Goalies
Daniel Bellissimo
Referees:
(Slovakia) Vladimír Baluška
(Russia) Vyacheslav Bulanov
Linesmen:
(Switzerland) Roger Arm
(Estonia) Anton Semionov

M. Trygg (M. Olimb) – 03:06	1–0
	1–1	05:11 – L. Ansoldi (D. Tudin)
P. Thoresen (P. Skrøder, A. Bastiansen) – 16:51	2–1
M. Holtet (P. Skrøder, P. Thoresen) (PP) – 24:27	3–1
A. Bastiansen (M. Olimb, L. Spets) – 30:35	4–1
	4–2	32:35 – A. Egger (T. Larkin, V. Rocco) (PP)
M. Trygg (L. Haugen) (SH) – 48:11	5–2
P. Skrøder (P. Thoresen, M. Holtet) (PP) – 54:49	6–2

24 min
Penalties
14 min
39
Shots
18

9 May 2012; 20:15	Sweden	5–2 (1–1, 2–1, 2–0)	Germany	Ericsson Globe, Stockholm; Attendance: 11,500

Game reference

Viktor Fasth
Goalies
Dennis Endras
Referees:
(Switzerland) Danny Kurmann
(Russia) Konstantin Olenin
Linesmen:
(France) Pierre Dehaen
(Slovakia) Miroslav Valach

M. Krüger (G. Landeskog, V. Hedman) – 01:17	1–0
	1–1	19:59 – P. Gogulla (K. Hospelt)
V. Stålberg (N. Hjalmarsson) – 26:38	2–1
E. Karlsson (H. Zetterberg, L. Eriksson) (PP) – 28:14	3–1
	3–2	36:58 – P. Reimer (C. Fischer, P. Gogulla)
N. Persson (J. Larsson) – 42:30	4–2
J. Franzén (H. Zetterberg) – 48:32	5–2

2 min
Penalties
6 min
45
Shots
17

10 May 2012; 16:15	Denmark	1–3 (1–2, 0–1, 0–0)	Russia	Ericsson Globe, Stockholm; Attendance: 2,117

Game reference

Simon Nielsen
Goalies
Konstantin Barulin
Referees:
(Germany) Lars Brüggemann
(Sweden) Morgan Johansson
Linesmen:
(France) Pierre Dehaen
(Finland) Sakari Suominen

	0–1	02:08 – Y. Medvedev (S. Shirokov, N. Zherdev)
L. Eller – 04:11	1–1
	1–2	13:35 – E. Malkin (A. Perezhogin, I. Nikulin)
	1–3	26:32 – D. Kalinin (E. Kuznetsov, S. Shirokov)

6 min
Penalties
2 min
36
Shots
52

10 May 2012; 20:15	Czech Republic	3–1 (0–0, 1–1, 2–0)	Latvia	Ericsson Globe, Stockholm; Attendance: 2,570

Game reference

Jakub Kovář
Goalies
Edgars Masaļskis
Referees:
(Russia) Vyacheslav Bulanov
(Switzerland) Danny Kurmann
Linesmen:
(Belarus) Ivan Dedioulia
(United States) Jonathan Morisson

	0–1	23:55 – A. Bērziņš (R. Ķēniņš)
M. Michálek (J. Nakládal, T. Plekanec) – 28:58	1–1
P. Nedvěd (O. Němec, P. Čáslava) – 50:50	2–1
T. Plekanec (M. Blaťák) (PP) – 53:22	3–1

12 min
Penalties
10 min
34
Shots
26

11 May 2012; 16:15	Italy	0–6 (0–2, 0–3, 0–1)	Czech Republic	Ericsson Globe, Stockholm; Attendance: 2,753

Game reference

Thomas Tragust
Goalies
Jakub Štěpánek
Referees:
(Sweden) Morgan Johansson
(Russia) Konstantin Olenin
Linesmen:
(Estonia) Anton Semionov
(Slovakia) Miroslav Valach

0–1	05:56 – P. Nedvěd (D. Krejčí, J. Nakládal) (PP)
0–2	12:45 – J. Novotný (J. Petružálek)
0–3	27:15 – P. Čáslava (P. Tenkrát) (SH)
0–4	31:45 – A. Hemský (M. Erat) (PP)
0–5	32:45 – P. Čáslava (J. Petružálek, P. Koukal)
0–6	54:29 – M. Erat (L. Krajíček) (PP)

12 min
Penalties
8 min
20
Shots
41

11 May 2012; 20:15	Russia	7–3 (1–2, 2–1, 4–0)	Sweden	Ericsson Globe, Stockholm; Attendance: 11,500

Game reference

Semyon Varlamov
Goalies
Viktor Fasth
Referees:
(Finland) Antti Boman
(United States) Keith Kaval
Linesmen:
(Switzerland) Roger Arm
(Canada) François Dussureault

	0–1	05:57 – E. Karlsson (V. Stålberg, D. Alfredsson) (PP)
A. Popov (E. Malkin) – 10:27	1–1
	1–2	14:33 – H. Zetterberg (D. Alfredsson, L. Eriksson) (PP)
	1–3	29:36 – J. Franzén (L. Eriksson, H. Zetterberg) (PP)
E. Malkin (E. Biryukov, E. Kuznetsov) (PP) – 36:00	2–3
A. Emelin (P. Datsyuk, D. Kalinin) (PP2) – 38:27	3–3
A. Perezhogin (Y. Medvedev) – 40:15	4–3
E. Malkin (A. Popov) – 42:40	5–3
E. Malkin (A. Popov) – 51:08	6–3
D. Denisov (E. Malkin, A. Popov) – 59:06	7–3

37 min
Penalties
10 min
36
Shots
46

12 May 2012; 12:15	Norway	3–0 (1–0, 2–0, 0–0)	Latvia	Ericsson Globe, Stockholm; Attendance: 5,332

Game reference

Lars Haugen
Goalies
Edgars Masaļskis
Referees:
(Germany) Lars Brüggemann
(Russia) Konstantin Olenin
Linesmen:
(Finland) Sakari Suominen
(Slovakia) Miroslav Valach

J. Holøs – 12:43	1–0
A. Martinsen (M. Trygg, M. Ask) – 25:54	2–0
P. Thoresen (M. Hansen, P. Skrøder) – 38:43	3–0

8 min
Penalties
22 min
30
Shots
25

12 May 2012; 16:15	Germany	2–1 (0–0, 1–1, 1–0)	Denmark	Ericsson Globe, Stockholm; Attendance: 5,107

Game reference

Dennis Endras
Goalies
Frederik Andersen
Referees:
(Slovakia) Vladimír Baluška
(Switzerland) Danny Kurmann
Linesmen:
(Switzerland) Roger Arm
(Belarus) Ivan Dedioulia

	0–1	21:35 – M. Green
T. Greilinger (C. Fischer, E. Kaufmann) – 37:10	1–1
P. Gogulla (P. Reimer, C. Ullmann) – 48:24	2–1

6 min
Penalties
2 min
27
Shots
28

12 May 2012; 20:15	Italy	0–4 (0–2, 0–1, 0–1)	Sweden	Ericsson Globe, Stockholm; Attendance: 8,979

Game reference

Daniel Bellissimo
Thomas Tragust
Goalies
Viktor Fasth
Referees:
(Finland) Antti Boman
(Russia) Vyacheslav Bulanov
Linesmen:
(United States) Jonathan Morisson
(Estonia) Anton Semionov

0–1	05:13 – M. Krüger (E. Karlsson, D. Alfredsson)
0–2	19:12 – S. Kronwall (G. Landeskog)
0–3	25:45 – E. Karlsson (H. Zetterberg) (PP2)
0–4	41:45 – G. Landeskog (L. Eriksson, H. Zetterberg)

16 min
Penalties
6 min
19
Shots
42

13 May 2012; 16:15	Russia	2–0 (1–0, 0–0, 1–0)	Czech Republic	Ericsson Globe, Stockholm; Attendance: 5,341

Game reference
Konstantin Barulin	Goalies	Jakub Kovář	Referees: (Germany) Lars Brüggemann (Switzerland) Danny Kurmann; Linesmen: (Canada) François Dussureault (United States) Jonathan Morisson
A. Perezhogin (I. Nikulin) – 00:24 / 1–0; E. Malkin (A. Popov) (PP) – 40:44 / 2–0			Referees: (Germany) Lars Brüggemann (Switzerland) Danny Kurmann; Linesmen: (Canada) François Dussureault (United States) Jonathan Morisson
8 min	Penalties	8 min	Referees: (Germany) Lars Brüggemann (Switzerland) Danny Kurmann; Linesmen: (Canada) François Dussureault (United States) Jonathan Morisson
23	Shots	30	Referees: (Germany) Lars Brüggemann (Switzerland) Danny Kurmann; Linesmen: (Canada) François Dussureault (United States) Jonathan Morisson

13 May 2012; 20:15	Germany	4–12 (0–3, 1–6, 3–3)	Norway	Ericsson Globe, Stockholm; Attendance: 2,462

Game reference

Dennis Endras
Dimitri Kotschnew
Goalies
Lars Haugen
Referees:
(Russia) Vyacheslav Bulanov
(United States) Keith Kaval
Linesmen:
(Belarus) Ivan Dedioulia
(France) Pierre Dehaen

	0–1	00:20 – P. Thoresen (M. Hansen, P. Skrøder)
	0–2	01:28 – P. Thoresen (M. Holtet) (PP)
	0–3	05:07 – M. Røymark (M. Holtet)
	0–4	23:16 – L. Spets (M. Olimb, A. Bastiansen)
	0–5	24:12 – J. Kaunismäki (M. Ask, K. Olimb)
	0–6	27:52 – J. Holøs (P. Thoresen, M. Ask) (PP)
	0–7	32:07 – P. Thoresen (M. Ask, H. Solberg)
	0–8	33:24 – P. Skrøder (M. Olimb, M. Ask) (PP)
	0–9	34:07 – M. Trygg (P. Thoresen, M. Hansen) (PP)
P. Reimer (P. Gogulla, C. Schubert) – 38:25	1–9
	1–10	40:44 – P. Skrøder (P. Thoresen, M. Hansen)
J. Krueger (P. Gogulla) – 41:01	2–10
	2–11	43:15 – M. Hansen (A. Bastiansen, J. Kaunismäki)
M. Kink (K. Lavallée) – 46:27	3–11
	3–12	52:05 – M. Trygg (M. Hansen)
C. Fischer (K. Hospelt, P. Gogulla) (PP2) – 57:17	4–12

26 min
Penalties
12 min
29
Shots
32

14 May 2012; 16:15	Latvia	0–2 (0–0, 0–2, 0–0)	Denmark	Ericsson Globe, Stockholm; Attendance: 2,197

Game reference
Edgars Masaļskis; Māris Jučers	Goalies	Frederik Andersen	Referees: (Germany) Lars Brüggemann (Russia) Vyacheslav Bulanov; Linesmen: (Switzerland) Roger Arm (Sweden) Jimmy Dahmen
0–1 / 24:48 – M. Green (N. Hardt); 0–2 / 35:23 – M. Madsen (L. Eller)			Referees: (Germany) Lars Brüggemann (Russia) Vyacheslav Bulanov; Linesmen: (Switzerland) Roger Arm (Sweden) Jimmy Dahmen
10 min	Penalties	22 min	Referees: (Germany) Lars Brüggemann (Russia) Vyacheslav Bulanov; Linesmen: (Switzerland) Roger Arm (Sweden) Jimmy Dahmen
35	Shots	28	Referees: (Germany) Lars Brüggemann (Russia) Vyacheslav Bulanov; Linesmen: (Switzerland) Roger Arm (Sweden) Jimmy Dahmen

14 May 2012; 20:15	Italy	0–4 (0–1, 0–2, 0–1)	Russia	Ericsson Globe, Stockholm; Attendance: 2,336

Game reference

Thomas Tragust
Goalies
Semyon Varlamov
Mikhail Biryukov
Referees:
(Slovakia) Vladimír Baluška
(Sweden) Morgan Johansson
Linesmen:
(Estonia) Anton Semionov
(Slovakia) Miroslav Valach

0–1	10:35 – P. Datsyuk (E. Kuznetsov)
0–2	24:28 – E. Kuznetsov (N. Kulemin, N. Nikitin)
0–3	28:07 – A. Popov (E. Biryukov, E. Malkin)
0–4	53:38 – A. Popov (A. Perezhogin)

4 min
Penalties
2 min
29
Shots
40

15 May 2012; 12:15	Norway	6–2 (0–0, 5–0, 1–2)	Denmark	Ericsson Globe, Stockholm; Attendance: 2,054

Game reference

Lars Haugen
Goalies
Frederik Andersen
Referees:
(Sweden) Morgan Johansson
(Switzerland) Danny Kurmann
Linesmen:
(Belarus) Ivan Dedioulia
(Estonia) Anton Semionov

L. Spets (M. Ask, M. Olimb) (EA) – 26:12	1–0
M. Ask (K. Olimb, A. Martinsen) – 27:29	2–0
P. Skrøder (P. Thoresen) – 35:35	3–0
J. Holøs (P. Thoresen, M. Hansen) (PP) – 37:53	4–0
P. Thoresen (A. Martinsen, J. Holøs) (PP) – 39:39	5–0
	5–1	43:03 – M. Madsen (P. Hersby)
	5–2	47:50 – M. Poulsen (P. Larsen)
M. Trygg (P. Thoresen, P. Skrøder) – 55:39	6–2

22 min
Penalties
45 min
27
Shots
28

15 May 2012; 16:15	Czech Republic	8–1 (3–1, 3–0, 2–0)	Germany	Ericsson Globe, Stockholm; Attendance: 2,114

Game reference

Jakub Štěpánek
Petr Mrázek
Goalies
Dennis Endras
Referees:
(Russia) Vyacheslav Bulanov
(Russia) Konstantin Olenin
Linesmen:
(Switzerland) Roger Arm
(Finland) Sakari Suominen

A. Hemský (P. Průcha) – 01:58	1–0
	1–1	07:36 – T. Greilinger (C. Schubert, C. Ullmann) (PP)
L. Krajíček (M. Vondrka, J. Novotný) – 10:34	2–1
M. Erat (J. Nakládal, D. Krejčí) (PP) – 16:05	3–1
P. Koukal (L. Krajíček, P. Čáslava) (PP) – 25:01	4–1
D. Krejčí (P. Tenkrát) (SH) – 29:55	5–1
J. Novotný (J. Petružálek) – 34:22	6–1
P. Koukal (D. Krejčí, T. Plekanec) (PP) – 44:34	7–1
M. Blaťák (D. Krejčí, T. Plekanec) (PP) – 46:42	8–1

4 min
Penalties
14 min
39
Shots
18

15 May 2012; 20:15	Sweden	4–0 (2–0, 1–0, 1–0)	Latvia	Ericsson Globe, Stockholm; Attendance: 9,358

Game reference

Viktor Fasth
Goalies
Māris Jučers
Referees:
(Slovakia) Vladimír Baluška
(Germany) Lars Brüggemann
Linesmen:
(France) Pierre Dehaen
(United States) Jonathan Morisson

L. Eriksson (H. Zetterberg, J. Franzén) – 04:39	1–0
J. Silfverberg (E. Karlsson, N. Bäckström) (PP) – 14:40	2–0
H. Zetterberg (D. Alfredsson) (PP) – 33:45	3–0
J. Franzén (H. Zetterberg, E. Karlsson) (PP) – 52:18	4–0

6 min
Penalties
33 min
44
Shots
22

== Playoff round ==
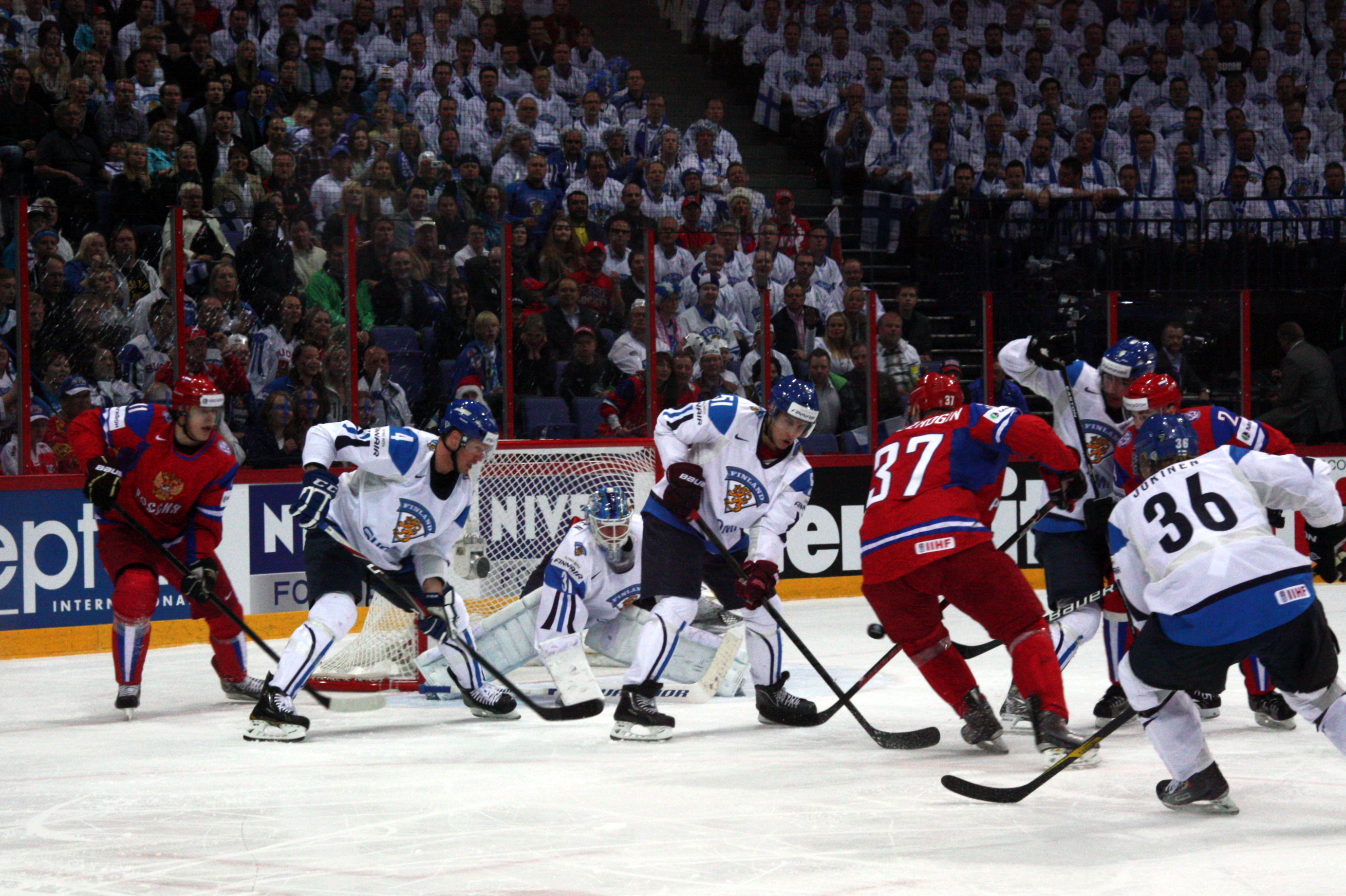
Finland against Russia (19.5.2012)

Quarterfinals
H1	Canada	3
H4	Slovakia	4
S2	Sweden	3
S3	Czech Republic	4
S1	Russia	5
S4	Norway	2
H2	United States	2
H3	Finland	3

Semifinals
WQF1	Slovakia	3
WQF2	Czech Republic	1
WQF3	Russia	6
WQF4	Finland	2

Finals
WSF1	Slovakia	2
WSF2	Russia	6
Bronze medal game
LSF1	Czech Republic	3
LSF2	Finland	2

=== Quarterfinals ===
The games in Stockholm are UTC+2, while the games in Helsinki are UTC+3.

17 May 2012; 13:00	Canada	3–4 (1–2, 2–0, 0–2)	Slovakia	Hartwall Areena, Helsinki; Attendance: 11,568

Game reference

Cam Ward
Goalies
Ján Laco
Referees:
(Czech Republic) Martin Fraňo
(Czech Republic) Antonín Jeřábek
Linesmen:
(Germany) Sirko Schulz
(Russia) Sergei Shelyanin

	0–1	05:57 – T. Kopecký (B. Radivojevič, M. Handzuš)
	0–2	09:14 – M. Šatan (L. Hudáček, T. Surový)
E. Kane (R. Getzlaf) – 16:14	1–2
J. Skinner (J. Eberle, P. Sharp) (PP) – 26:30	2–2
A. Burrows (K. Russell, A. Ladd) – 37:43	3–2
	3–3	53:25 – M. Bartovič (T. Tatar)
	3–4	57:32 – M. Handzuš (A. Sekera) (PP)

31 min
Penalties
6 min
36
Shots
28

17 May 2012; 14:45	Russia	5–2 (2–1, 0–1, 3–0)	Norway	Ericsson Globe, Stockholm; Attendance: 7,519

Game reference

Semyon Varlamov
Goalies
Lars Haugen
Referees:
(Germany) Lars Brüggemann
(Switzerland) Danny Kurmann
Linesmen:
(Estonia) Anton Semionov
(Finland) Sakari Suominen

	0–1	07:26 – P. Skrøder (M. Hansen, P. Thoresen)
A. Ovechkin (A. Semin) – 11:33	1–1
A. Popov (A. Emelin, E. Ryasensky) – 14:09	2–1
	2–2	20:28 – P. Thoresen (M. Ask, J. Holøs) (PP)
A. Emelin (P. Datsyuk, A. Semin) – 40:55	3–2
N. Zherdev (E. Biryukov, A. Tereshchenko) – 50:43	4–2
I. Nikulin (E. Malkin) (PP) – 54:52	5–2

2 min
Penalties
8 min
45
Shots
21

17 May 2012; 18:30	United States	2–3 (0–0, 1–1, 1–2)	Finland	Hartwall Areena, Helsinki; Attendance: 12,426

Game reference

Jimmy Howard
Goalies
Petri Vehanen
Referees:
(Russia) Vyacheslav Bulanov
(Russia) Konstantin Olenin
Linesmen:
(Czech Republic) Petr Blumel
(Canada) Jesse Wilmot

	0–1	33:27 – J. Joensuu (A. Pihlström, L. Kukkonen)
K. Palmieri (J. Petry, J. Crabb) – 33:48	1–1
B. Ryan (J. Faulk, C. Smith) – 41:49	2–1
	2–2	53:02 – M. Koivu (J. Jokinen, V. Filppula)
	2–3	59:51 – J. Joensuu (P. Kontiola)

2 min
Penalties
0 min
26
Shots
31

17 May 2012; 20:15	Sweden	3–4 (1–2, 1–1, 1–1)	Czech Republic	Ericsson Globe, Stockholm; Attendance: 10,397

Game reference

Viktor Fasth
Goalies
Jakub Kovář
Referees:
(Finland) Jari Levonen
(Switzerland) Brent Reiber
Linesmen:
(Canada) François Dussureault
(United States) Johnathan Morrison

L. Eriksson (H. Zetterberg, J. Franzén) – 07:10	1–0
	1–1	11:50 – P. Nedvěd (J. Nakládal, O. Němec)
	1–2	16:56 – J. Novotný (M. Michálek)
	1–3	30:27 – M. Erat (D. Krejčí) (PP)
H. Zetterberg – 39:15	2–3
J. Ericsson (L. Eriksson, G. Landeskog) – 40:45	3–3
	3–4	59:31 – M. Michálek

6 min
Penalties
2 min
39
Shots
32

=== Semifinals ===
All times are local (UTC+3).

19 May 2012; 14:30	Russia	6–2 (2–1, 2–0, 2–1)	Finland	Hartwall Areena, Helsinki; Attendance: 13,239

Game reference

Semyon Varlamov
Goalies
Petri Vehanen
Referees:
(Czech Republic) Antonín Jeřábek
(Switzerland) Brent Reiber
Linesmen:
(Canada) François Dussureault
(United States) Jonathan Morisson

	0–1	07:28 – J. Niskala (P. Kontiola, J. Joensuu)
E. Malkin (N. Nikitin, A. Popov) – 15:33	1–1
E. Malkin (N. Zherdev, S. Shirokov) (PP) – 19:06	2–1
A. Ovechkin (D. Denisov, A. Popov) – 29:47	3–1
E. Malkin (I. Nikulin) (PP) – 37:46	4–1
D. Kokarev (N. Kulemin) – 41:05	5–1
S. Shirokov (E. Biryukov, N. Nikitin) (PP) – 48:41	6–1
	6–2	56:04 – M. Granlund (J. Järvinen, M. Koivu)

4 min
Penalties
8 min
23
Shots
31

19 May 2012; 18:30	Czech Republic	1–3 (0–1, 1–0, 0–2)	Slovakia	Hartwall Areena, Helsinki; Attendance: 12,355

Game reference

Jakub Kovář
Jakub Štěpánek
Goalies
Ján Laco
Referees:
(Germany) Lars Brüggemann
(Finland) Jari Levonen
Linesmen:
(Germany) Sirko Schulz
(Canada) Jesse Wilmot

	0–1	15:52 – M. Šatan (A. Sekera, I. Baranka)
M. Frolík (T. Plekanec) – 30:45	1–1
	1–2	40:56 – M. Šatan (M. Handzuš) (SH)
	1–3	44:23 – L. Hudáček (T. Surový)

0 min
Penalties
6 min
37
Shots
28

=== Bronze medal game ===
Time is local (UTC+3).

20 May 2012; 16:00	Finland	2–3 (1–3, 0–0, 1–0)	Czech Republic	Hartwall Areena, Helsinki; Attendance: 12,879

Game reference

Petri Vehanen
Goalies
Jakub Štěpánek
Referees:
(Russia) Vyacheslav Bulanov
(Switzerland) Danny Kurmann
Linesmen:
(Russia) Sergei Shelyanin
(Slovakia) Miroslav Valach

	0–1	12:17 – P. Průcha (L. Krajíček, A. Hemský) (PP)
M. Pyörälä (J. Immonen, J. Järvinen) – 16:53	1–1
	1–2	17:22 – J. Novotný (L. Kašpar)
	1–3	19:07 – D. Krejčí (A. Hemský)
J. Jokinen (M. Mäenpää, M. Koivu) (PP) – 49:01	2–3

8 min
Penalties
12 min
36
Shots
28

=== Gold medal game ===
Time is local (UTC+3).

20 May 2012; 20:30	Russia	6–2 (1–1, 3–0, 2–1)	Slovakia	Hartwall Areena, Helsinki; Attendance: 13,242

Game reference

Semyon Varlamov
Goalies
Ján Laco
Peter Hamerlík
Referees:
(Czech Republic) Antonín Jeřábek
(Switzerland) Brent Reiber
Linesmen:
(Switzerland) Roger Arm
(Czech Republic) Petr Blumel

	0–1	01:06 – Z. Chára (T. Surový)
A. Semin (A. Ovechkin, P. Datsyuk) – 09:57	1–1
A. Perezhogin (A. Popov) – 26:10	2–1
A. Tereshchenko (S. Shirokov, N. Zherdev) – 33:31	3–1
A. Semin (P. Datsyuk) – 35:22	4–1
P. Datsyuk (A. Semin, A. Ovechkin) – 43:55	5–1
	5–2	49:37 – Z. Chára (T. Surový, M. Šatan) (PP)
E. Malkin (I. Nikulin, N. Nikitin) – 58:02	6–2

2 min
Penalties
4 min
42
Shots
31

2012 IIHF World Championship winners

Russia
4th/26th title

== Ranking and statistics ==
=== Tournament awards ===
- Best players selected by the directorate:
  - Best Goaltender: (Slovakia) Ján Laco
  - Best Defenceman: (Slovakia) Zdeno Chára
  - Best Forward: (Russia) Evgeni Malkin
  - Most Valuable Player: (Russia) Evgeni Malkin
- Media All-Star Team:
  - Goaltender: (Slovakia) Ján Laco
  - Defence: (Slovakia) Zdeno Chára, (Russia) Ilya Nikulin
  - Forwards: (Russia) Evgeni Malkin, (Norway) Patrick Thoresen, (Sweden) Henrik Zetterberg

=== Final standings ===
The official IIHF final standings of the tournament:

1st place, gold medalist(s)	Russia
2nd place, silver medalist(s)	Slovakia
3rd place, bronze medalist(s)	Czech Republic
4	Finland
5	Canada
6	Sweden
7	United States
8	Norway
9	France
10	Latvia
11	Switzerland
12	Germany
13	Denmark
14	Belarus
15	Italy
16	Kazakhstan

=== Scoring leaders ===
List shows the top skaters sorted by points, then goals. If the list exceeds 10 skaters because of a tie in points, all of the tied skaters are shown.

Player	GP	G	A	Pts	+/−	PIM	POS
(Russia) Evgeni Malkin	10	11	8	19	+16	4	F
(Norway) Patrick Thoresen	8	7	11	18	+6	4	F
(Sweden) Henrik Zetterberg	8	3	12	15	+6	4	F
(Sweden) Loui Eriksson	8	5	8	13	+7	2	F
(Norway) Per-Åge Skrøder	8	5	7	12	+7	2	F
(Russia) Alexander Popov	10	4	8	12	+15	2	F
(United States) Max Pacioretty	8	2	10	12	+5	4	F
(Finland) Mikko Koivu	10	3	8	11	0	4	F
(Canada) Duncan Keith	8	1	10	11	+7	0	D
(Finland) Valtteri Filppula	10	4	6	10	+1	6	F

GP = Games played; G = Goals; A = Assists; Pts = Points; +/− = Plus/minus; PIM = Penalties in minutes; POS = Position
Source: IIHF.com

=== Leading goaltenders ===
Only the top ten goaltenders, based on save percentage, who have played 40% of their team's minutes, are included in this list.

Player	TOI	GA	GAA	SA	Sv%	SO
(Russia) Semyon Varlamov	440:00	13	1.77	214	93.93	1
(Czech Republic) Jakub Štěpánek	242:07	6	1.49	98	93.88	1
(Czech Republic) Jakub Kovář	351:14	12	2.05	166	92.77	1
(Slovakia) Ján Laco	524:10	19	2.17	250	92.40	1
(Belarus) Vitali Koval	266:26	13	2.93	163	92.02	0
(Latvia) Edgars Masalskis	340:00	15	2.65	187	91.98	1
(United States) Jimmy Howard	421:08	17	2.42	190	91.05	1
(Norway) Lars Haugen	424:53	20	2.82	220	90.91	1
(Finland) Petri Vehanen	366:43	13	2.13	140	90.71	1
(Canada) Cam Ward	360:32	17	2.83	181	90.61	0

TOI = Time on ice (minutes:seconds); SA = Shots against; GA = Goals against; GAA = Goals against average; Sv% = Save percentage; SO = Shutouts
Source: IIHF.com

== IIHF broadcasting rights ==
Over 100 countries broadcast the matches, live or near-live transmissions, of the 2012 tournament.

Country	Broadcaster
Belarus	BTRC
Canada	TSN
Canada	RDS
Czech Republic	Czech Television
Denmark	TV2 Sport
Finland	MTV3
Finland	Canal+
France	Sport+
Germany	SPORT1
Hungary	Sport 1
Italy	Sportitalia
Kazakhstan	KZ Sport 1
Latvia	Viasat
Norway	MAX
Poland	TVP
Romania	Sport 1
Russia	VGTRK
Russia	Channel One
Serbia	Arena Sport
Slovakia	RTVS
Slovenia	Šport TV 1
Spain	Sportmanía
Sweden	TV4
Switzerland	SRG SSR
Turkey	Sports TV
Ukraine	Hockey TV
United States	NBC Sports Network
International	YouTube

== IIHF honors and awards ==
The 2012 IIHF Hall of Fame induction ceremony has held in Helsinki during the World Championships. Kent Angus of Canada was given the Paul Loicq Award for outstanding contributions to international ice hockey. The IIHF Milestone Award was established in 2012, to be given to "the team or teams that make a significant contribution to international hockey or will have a decisive influence on the development of the game". The inaugural Milestone Award recipients were the Canada men's national team and Soviet Union men's national team on the 40th anniversary of the 1972 Summit Series.

IIHF Hall of Fame inductees

- Pavel Bure, Russia
- Raimo Helminen, Finland
- Phil Housley, United States
- Andy Murray, Canada
- Milan Nový, Czech Republic
