= 2012 IIHF World Championship final =

Final of national man competition

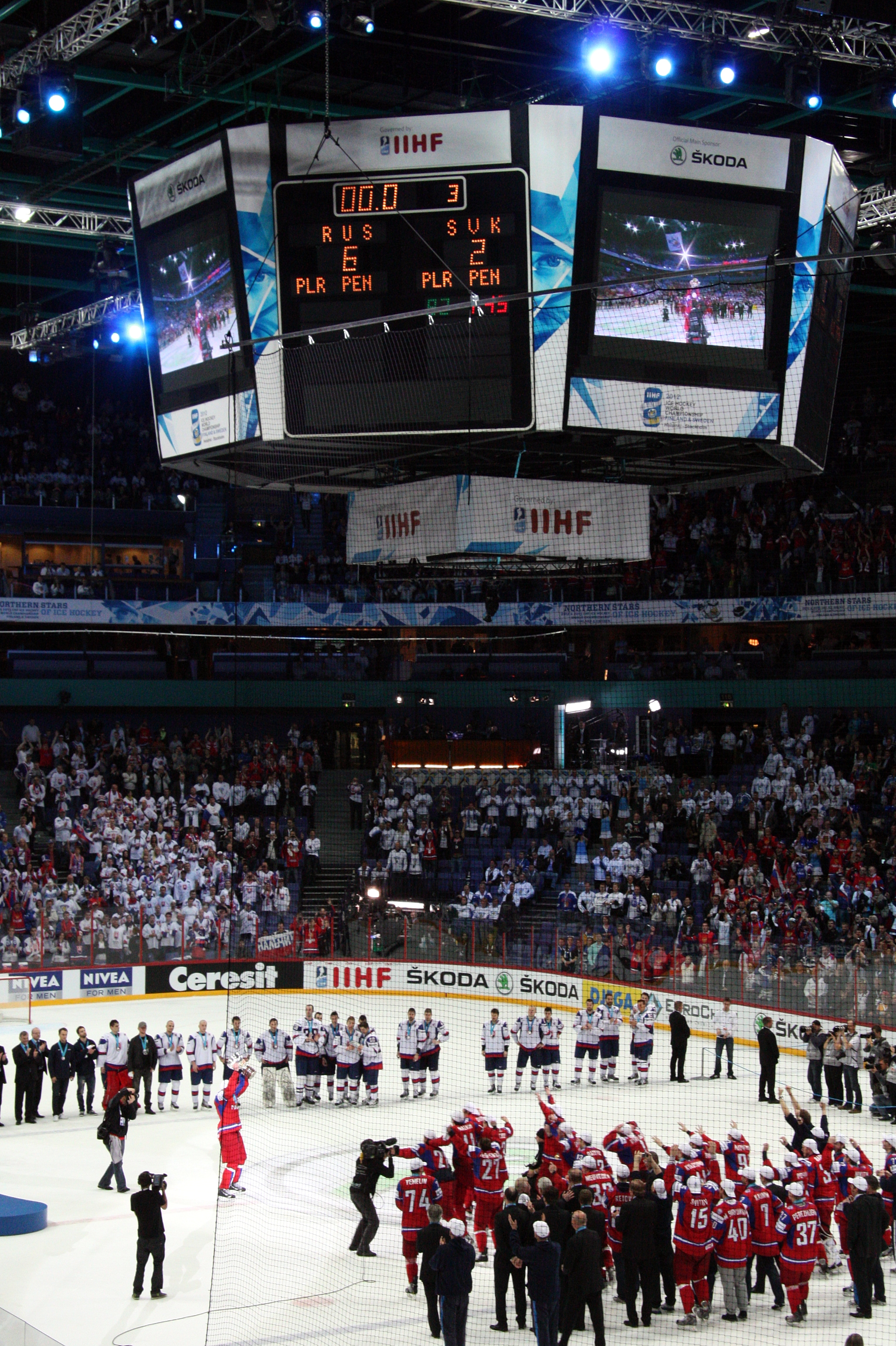
	1	2	3	Total
Russia	1	3	2	6
Slovakia	1	0	1	2
- Date: 20 May 2012
- Arena: Hartwall Areena
- City: Helsinki
- Attendance: 13,242

The 2012 IIHF World Championship final was played at the Hartwall Areena in Helsinki, Finland, on 20 May 2012 between Russia and Slovakia.

Russia won the gold medal by defeating Slovakia 6–2.

== Background ==
Slovakia and Russia faced each other in the 2002 Championship final; that game ended 4–3 in favour of the Slovaks, who captured the team's only gold medal in World Championship history.

The 2012 final was Slovakia's third final in history, and their first since 2002. Russia made their fourth final appearance in five years. Russia had won twenty-five gold medals (three as Russia) previously.

== Road to the final ==
Russia
Round
Slovakia

Team	GP	W	OTW	OTL	L	GF	GA	DIF	PTS
Russia	7	7	0	0	0	27	8	+19	21
Sweden	7	6	0	0	1	29	15	+14	18
Czech Republic	7	4	1	0	2	24	11	+13	14
Norway	7	4	0	1	2	33	19	+14	13
Latvia	7	2	0	0	5	11	19	−8	6
Germany	7	2	0	0	5	14	31	−17	6
Denmark	7	1	0	1	5	13	23	−10	4
Italy	7	0	1	0	6	6	31	−25	2

Preliminary

Team	GP	W	OTW	OTL	L	GF	GA	DIF	PTS
Canada	7	6	0	1	0	35	15	+20	19
United States	7	4	2	0	1	32	17	+15	16
Finland	7	5	0	0	2	21	14	+7	15
Slovakia	7	5	0	0	2	21	13	+8	15
France	7	3	0	0	4	21	32	−11	9
Switzerland	7	2	0	0	5	16	21	−5	6
Belarus	7	1	0	0	6	11	23	−12	3
Kazakhstan	7	0	0	1	6	11	33	−22	1

Opponent
Result
Playoff
Opponent
Result
Norway
5–2
Quarterfinals
Canada
4–3
Finland
6–2
Semifinals
Czech Republic
3–1

== Match ==
=== Summary ===
The first period had only lasted one minute before Slovakia captain Zdeno Chára fired a hard shot from the blue line to open up the score. Russia would then dominate the rest of the period, and at 09:57 Alexander Semin received a pass from Washington Capitals teammate Alexander Ovechkin on a breakaway and tied the game 1–1. Russia continued to pressure the Slovaks' net, but a solid-playing Ján Laco and good defensive play by the Slovaks kept the game even. No penalties were called during the game's first 20 minutes.

In the second period, Russia grabbed a three-goal lead. In a tangled situation in front of Slovakia's goaltender, Alexander Perezhogin put the puck in the net and gave Russia their first lead of the game at 26:10. Then at 33:31 Sergei Shirokov passed to assistant captain Alexei Tereshchenko on a two-on-one situation and Tereshchenko scored to give the Russians a 3–1 lead. Less than two minutes later, Pavel Datsyuk stole the puck in the Slovak zone and passed to Alexander Semin who netted his second goal of the game, giving Russia a three-goal lead. Shortly thereafter, at 35:43, Zdeno Chára was given the first penalty of the game, a tripping penalty. The Russians were unsuccessful in converting on the power play. Russia outshot Slovakia 16–8 in the second period.

At 43:55 in the third period, Pavel Datsyuk sealed the game for Russia with his first goal of the game. Shortly after this, Slovakia's goaltender Ján Laco was pulled and replaced by Peter Hamerlík. Slovakia was given an opportunity on the power play following a slashing penalty on Alexander Ovechkin at 48:47, Russia's first penalty of the game. It took 50 seconds on the power play before Zdeno Chára scored his second goal of the game on a one-timer in front of the net to cut the deficit to three goals. Evgeni Malkin finished the game off at 58:02 by scoring his eleventh goal of the tournament to make the score 6–2.

The game ended 6–2 for Russia, who captured the team's twenty-sixth World Championship gold medal in history (fourth as Russia). Slovakia earned their second World Championship silver medal.

After the game had ended, several Slovak players donned Pavol Demitra jerseys backwards to honor his memory. Demitra had died on September 7, 2011.

Evgeni Malkin was named the MVP of the tournament.

=== Details ===
20 May 2012; 20:30	Russia	6–2 (1–1, 3–0, 2–1)	Slovakia	Hartwall Areena, Helsinki; Attendance: 13,242

Game reference

Semyon Varlamov
Goalies
Ján Laco
Peter Hamerlík
Referees:
(Czech Republic) Antonín Jeřábek
(Switzerland) Brent Reiber
Linesmen:
(Switzerland) Roger Arm
(Czech Republic) Petr Blumel

	0–1	01:06 – Z. Chára (T. Surový)
A. Semin (A. Ovechkin, P. Datsyuk) – 09:57	1–1
A. Perezhogin (A. Popov) – 26:10	2–1
A. Tereshchenko (S. Shirokov, N. Zherdev) – 33:31	3–1
A. Semin (P. Datsyuk) – 35:22	4–1
P. Datsyuk (A. Semin, A. Ovechkin) – 43:55	5–1
	5–2	49:37 – Z. Chára (T. Surový, M. Šatan) (PP)
E. Malkin (I. Nikulin, N. Nikitin) – 58:02	6–2

2 min
Penalties
4 min
42
Shots
31
