= Yevgeny Biryukov =

Russian ice hockey player (born 1986)

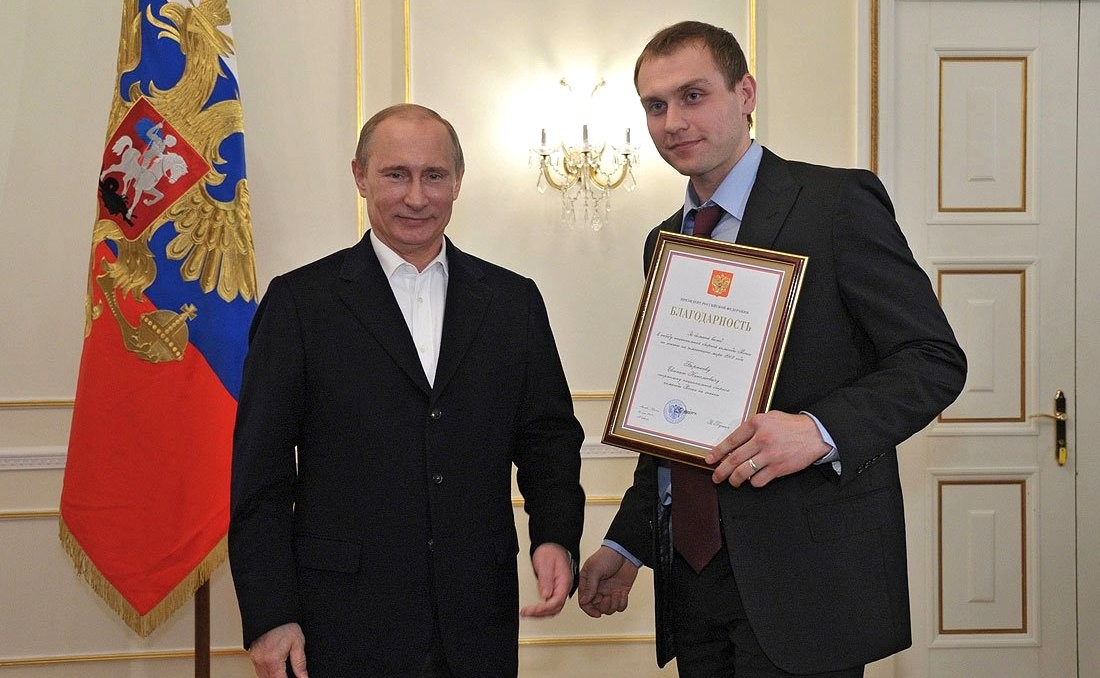
- Born: 19 April 1986 (age 38); Kasli, Russian SFSR, USSR
- Height: 6 ft 1 in (185 cm)
- Weight: 205 lb (93 kg; 14 st 9 lb)
- Position: Defence
- Shot: Left
- Played for: Metallurg Magnitogorsk; Salavat Yulaev Ufa
- National team: Russia
- Playing career: 2005–2024

Yevgeny Nikolayevich Biryukov (Russian: Евгений Николаевич Бирюков) (born 19 April 1986) is a Russian former professional ice hockey defenceman. He played for Metallurg Magnitogorsk and Salavat Yulaev Ufa of the Kontinental Hockey League (KHL).

== Playing career ==
Before joining Salavat he previously served as an alternate captain for Metallurg Magnitogorsk of the KHL. He played the first 13 seasons since the inception of the KHL with Magnitogorsk, claiming two Gagarin Cups before leaving the club as a free agent following the 2019–20 season.

On 8 May 2020, he signed a one-year contract with near rival club, Salavat Yulaev Ufa.

== Career statistics ==
=== Regular season and playoffs ===
			Regular season					Playoffs
Season	Team	League	GP	G	A	Pts	PIM	GP	G	A	Pts	PIM
2005–06	Metallurg Magnitogorsk	RSL	39	1	2	3	28	5	0	0	0	4
2006–07	Metallurg Magnitogorsk	RSL	48	1	6	7	50	15	0	2	2	10
2007–08	Metallurg Magnitogorsk	RSL	29	1	6	7	16	13	0	1	1	14
2008–09	Metallurg Magnitogorsk	KHL	55	3	8	11	50	12	0	1	1	8
2009–10	Metallurg Magnitogorsk	KHL	56	1	6	7	22	10	0	1	1	6
2010–11	Metallurg Magnitogorsk	KHL	54	2	13	15	30	19	0	5	5	6
2011–12	Metallurg Magnitogorsk	KHL	53	3	7	10	28	12	1	1	2	4
2012–13	Metallurg Magnitogorsk	KHL	42	1	4	5	34	7	0	1	1	8
2013–14	Metallurg Magnitogorsk	KHL	51	0	14	14	63	21	1	2	3	6
2014–15	Metallurg Magnitogorsk	KHL	57	4	10	14	20	10	0	1	1	8
2015–16	Metallurg Magnitogorsk	KHL	40	1	2	3	22	23	0	3	3	26
2016–17	Metallurg Magnitogorsk	KHL	57	1	9	10	22	18	0	4	4	6
2017–18	Metallurg Magnitogorsk	KHL	56	1	3	4	22	11	0	1	1	8
2018–19	Metallurg Magnitogorsk	KHL	57	2	8	10	28	6	0	0	0	0
2019–20	Metallurg Magnitogorsk	KHL	49	1	1	2	22	3	0	0	0	2
2020–21	Salavat Yulaev Ufa	KHL	55	1	5	6	18	9	0	1	1	2
2021–22	Salavat Yulaev Ufa	KHL	41	0	4	4	12	11	0	2	2	4
2022–23	Salavat Yulaev Ufa	KHL	67	0	4	4	22	6	0	0	0	0
2023–24	Salavat Yulaev Ufa	KHL	33	1	3	4	8	—	—	—	—	—
KHL totals			823	22	101	123	423	178	2	23	25	94

Medal record

Representing Russia

Ice hockey

World Championships
Gold medal – first place	2012 Finland/Sweden	
Silver medal – second place	2015 Czech Republic	

World Junior Championships
Silver medal – second place	2006 Canada	

IIHF U18 Championships
Gold medal – first place	2004 Belarus	

=== International ===
Year	Team	Event	Result	GP	G	A	Pts	PIM
2004	Russia	WJC18	1st place, gold medalist(s)	6	0	0	0	4
2006	Russia	WJC	2nd place, silver medalist(s)	6	0	4	4	6
2012	Russia	WC	1st place, gold medalist(s)	7	1	3	4	4
2013	Russia	WC	6th	8	1	1	2	4
2015	Russia	WC	2nd place, silver medalist(s)	2	0	1	1	0
Junior totals				12	0	4	4	10
Senior totals				17	2	5	7	8

== Awards and honors ==
Award	Year
KHL
Gagarin Cup (Metallurg Magnitogorsk)	2014, 2016
