= Anthony Guttig =

French ice hockey player

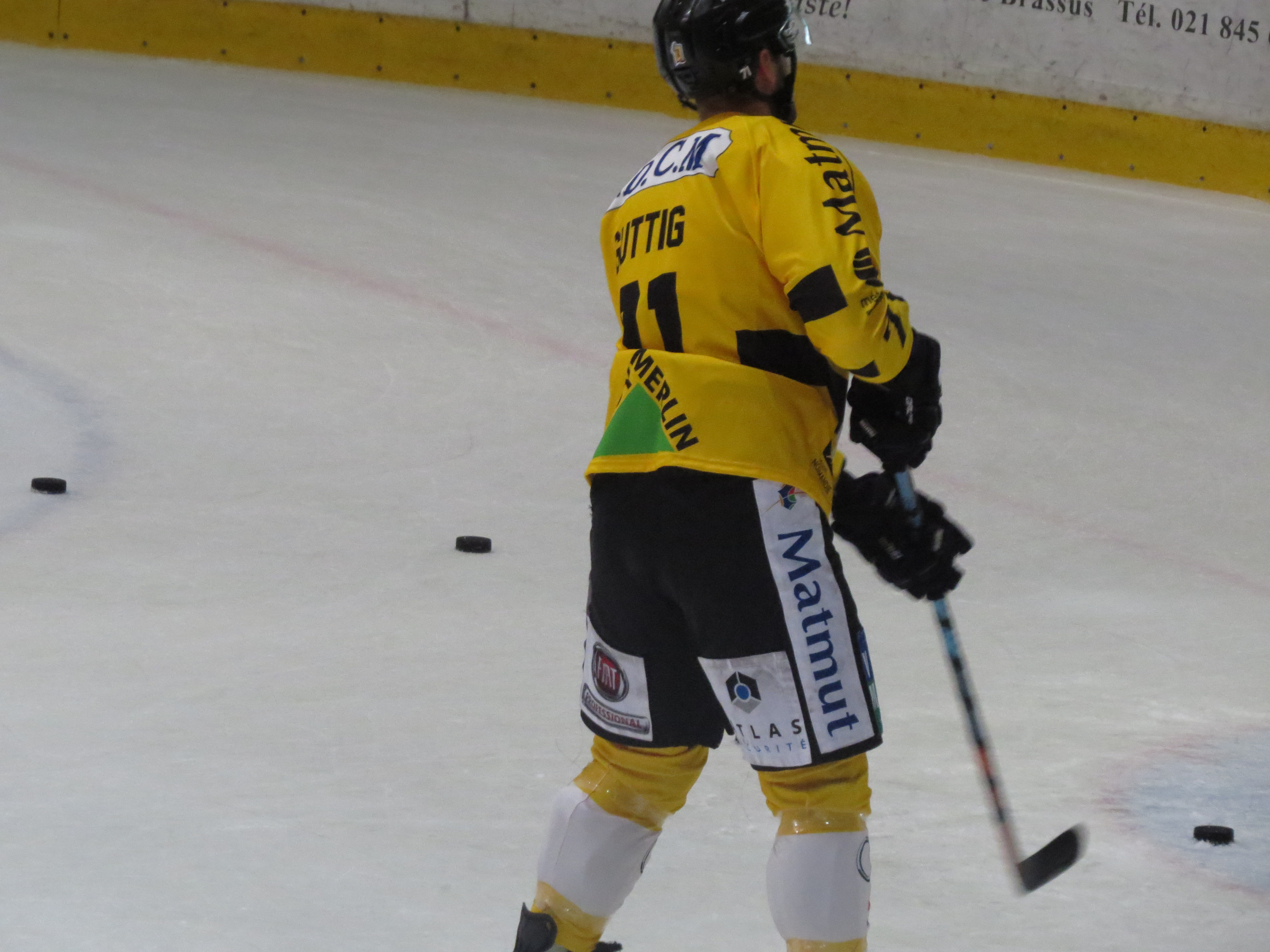
- Born: October 30, 1988 (age 36); Dijon, France
- Height: 6 ft 1 in (185 cm)
- Weight: 192 lb (87 kg; 13 st 10 lb)
- Position: Forward
- Shoots: Left
- Ligue Magnus team Former teams: Dragons de Rouen; Ducs de Dijon; KooKoo
- National team: France
- Playing career: 2004–present

Anthony Guttig (born October 30, 1988) is a French professional ice hockey player who is currently playing for the Dragons de Rouen of the Ligue Magnus. Guttig competed in the 2012 IIHF World Championship as a member of the France men's national ice hockey team.

Guttig won the 2015 Mestis playoffs with Mikkelin Jukurit and was named playoff MVP. After playing a season with KooKoo in the Liiga, Guttig returned to France and signed with Ducs de Dijon for the 2016–17 season.
