= Denis Kokarev =

Russian ice hockey player (born 1985)

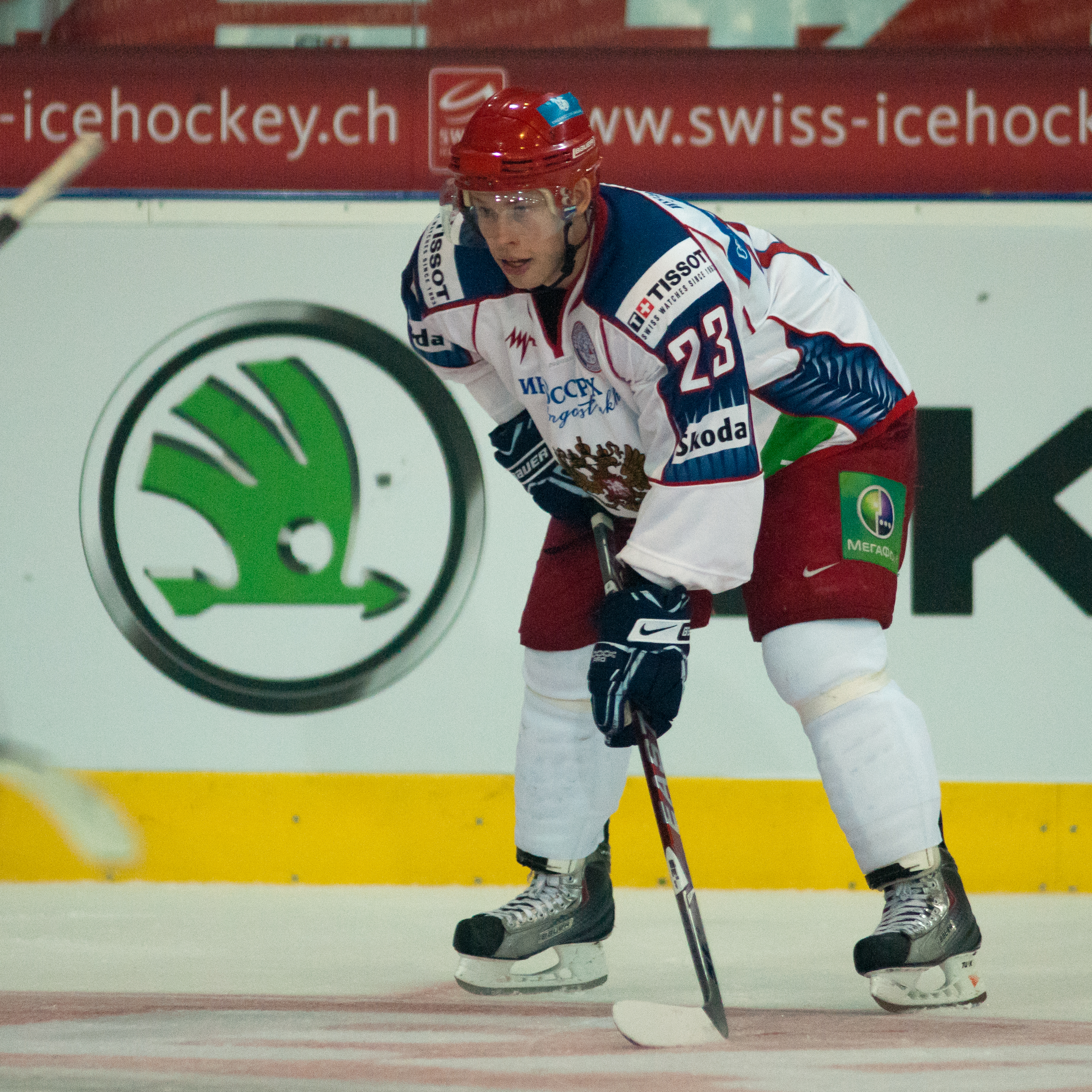
- Born: June 17, 1985 (age 41) Kalinin, Soviet Union
- Height: 5 ft 10 in (178 cm)
- Weight: 174 lb (79 kg; 12 st 6 lb)
- Position: Right wing
- Shoots: Left
- VHL team Former teams: Dynamo MO; HC MVD; Dynamo Moscow; Salavat Yulaev Ufa; Metallurg Magnitogorsk; HC Vityaz; Spartak Moscow
- National team: Russia
- Playing career: 2005–present

Denis Sergeyevich Kokarev (Russian: Денис Серге́евич Кокарев; born June 17, 1985) is a Russian professional ice hockey player who is currently playing for Dynamo MO of the Supreme Hockey League (VHL).

== Playing career ==
After 7 seasons within the rebranded HC Dynamo Moscow from his tenure with HC MVD, Kokarev while still contracted was granted free agent status from the KHL following the 2016–17 season, due to the club's debt on July 4, 2017. With Dynamo unwilling to offer an improved contract, Kokarev left to sign a two-year contract with Salavat Yulaev Ufa the following day on July 5, 2017.

== Career statistics ==
=== International ===
| Year | Team | Event | Result | GP | G | A | Pts | PIM |
|---|---|---|---|---|---|---|---|---|
| 2012 | Russia | WC | 1st place, gold medalist(s) | 10 | 1 | 0 | 1 | 4 |
| 2013 | Russia | WC | 6th | 8 | 1 | 1 | 2 | 0 |
| Senior totals | | | | 18 | 2 | 1 | 3 | 4 |
