= Evgeni Kovyrshin =

Belarusian ice hockey player

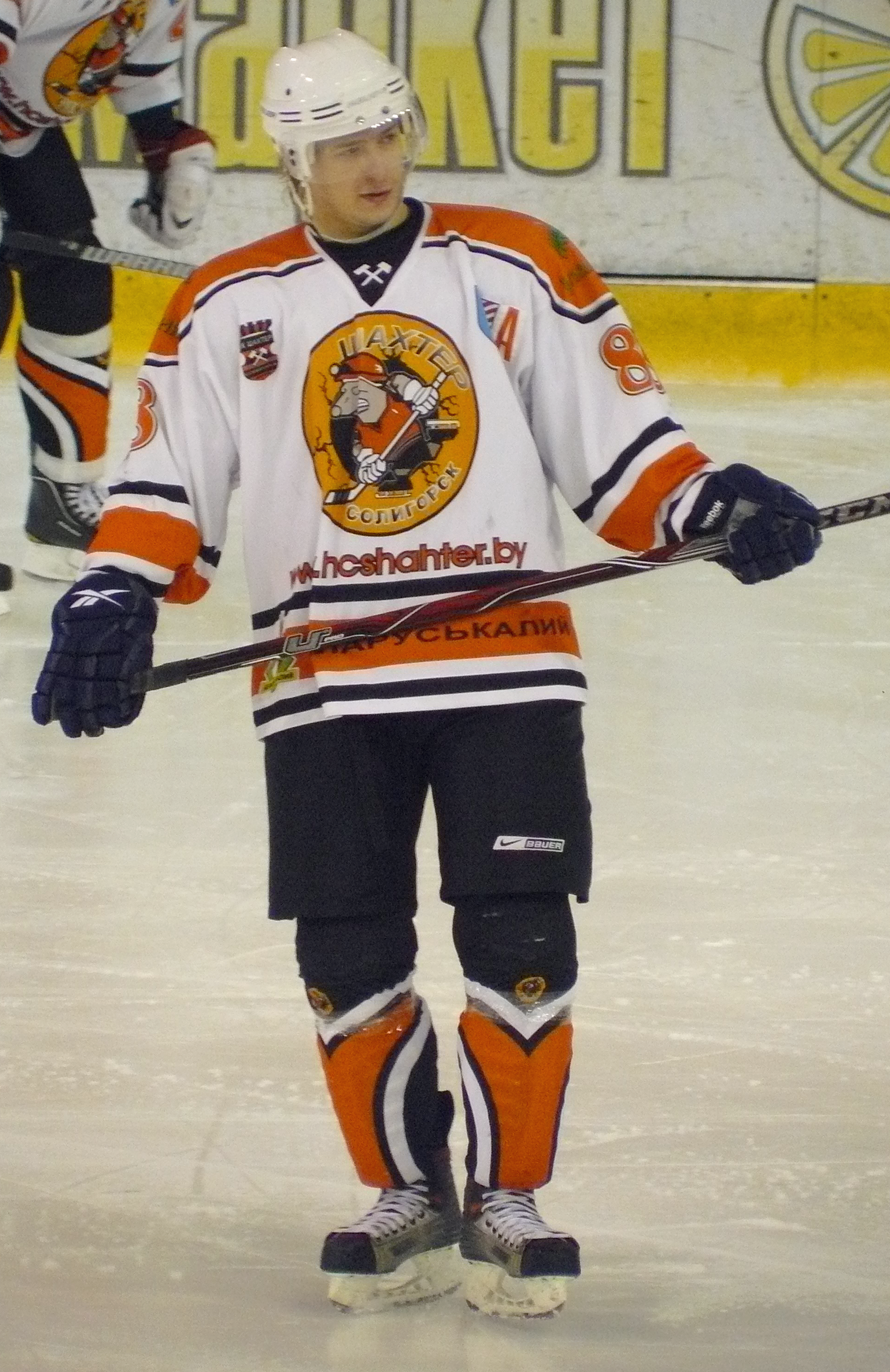
- Born: 25 January 1986 (age 40) Elektrostal, Soviet Union
- Height: 5 ft 10 in (178 cm)
- Weight: 172 lb (78 kg; 12 st 4 lb)
- Position: Centre
- Shot: Left
- Played for: HK Brest; Keramin Minsk; Dinamo Minsk; HC Shakhtyor Soligorsk; Severstal Cherepovets; Yunost Minsk
- National team: Belarus
- Playing career: 2004–2021

Evgeni Kovyrshin (born 25 January 1986) is a Belarusian ice hockey coach and former professional ice hockey forward who is currently an assistant coach for Yunost Minsk in the Belarusian Extraleague (BXL).

Kovyrshin participated at the 2010 IIHF World Championship as a member of the Belarus national men's ice hockey team.
