= Christopher Fischer =

German ice hockey player

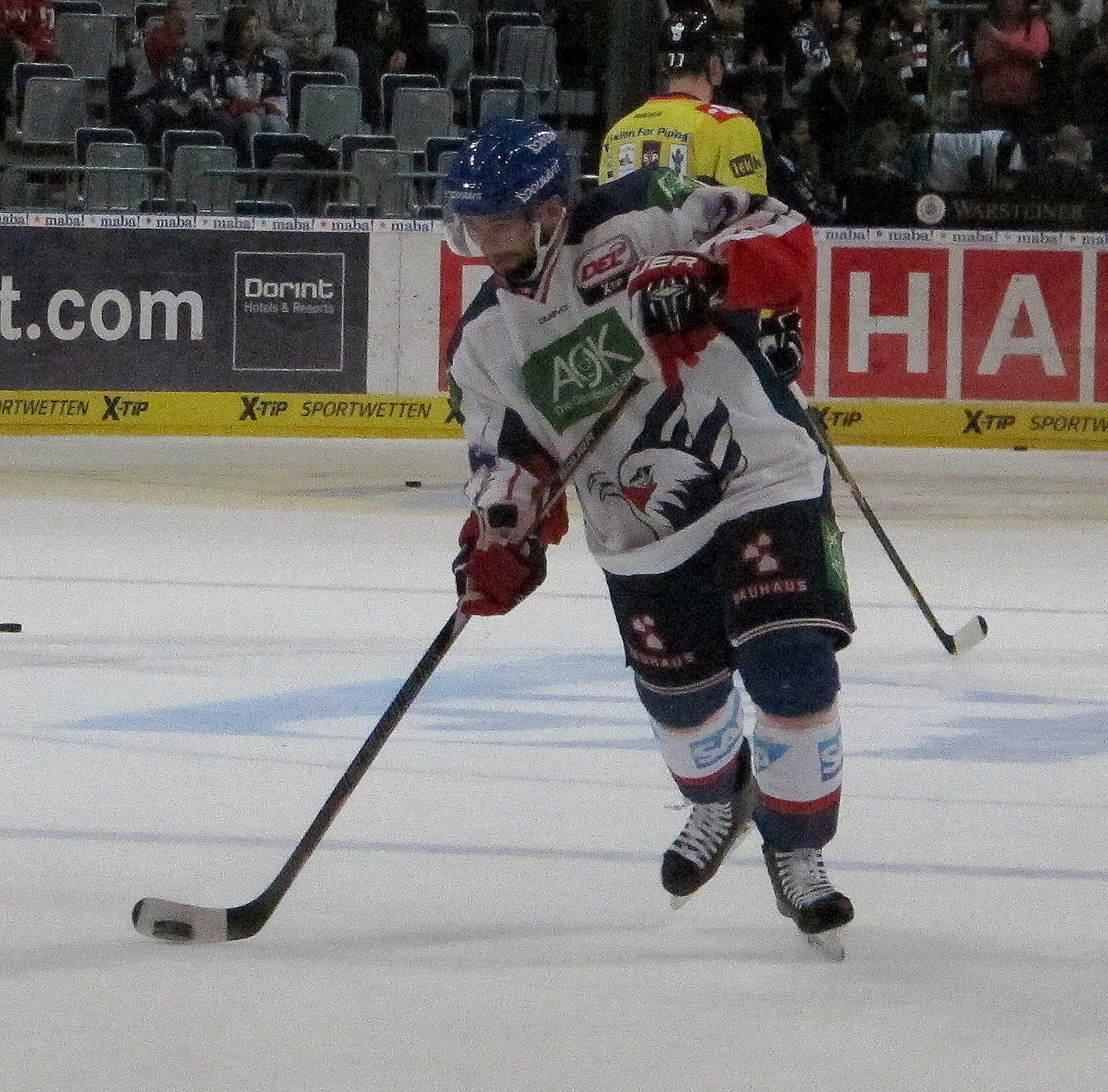
- Born: January 24, 1988 (age 37); Heidelberg, West Germany
- Height: 5 ft 11 in (180 cm)
- Weight: 190 lb (86 kg; 13 st 8 lb)
- Position: Defence
- Shoots: Right
- DEL team Former teams: Schwenninger Wild Wings; Adler Mannheim; EHC Wolfsburg; Iserlohn Roosters
- National team: Germany
- Playing career: 2006–present

Christopher Fischer (born January 24, 1988) is a German professional ice hockey defenceman. He is currently playing for the Schwenninger Wild Wings in the Deutsche Eishockey Liga (DEL).

== Playing career ==
After four seasons with EHC Wolfsburg, Fischer returned his original youth team Adler Mannheim on April 12, 2013.

After three additional seasons with Adler Mannheim, Fischer left as a free agent for a second time in signing a three-year contract with his third DEL outfit, the Iserlohn Roosters, on April 4, 2016.

Fischer remained with the Rooster until the conclusion of his contract following the 2018–19 season, leaving to sign a two-year contract with the Schwenninger Wild Wings on March 19, 2019.
