= Danny Kurmann =

Ice hockey official

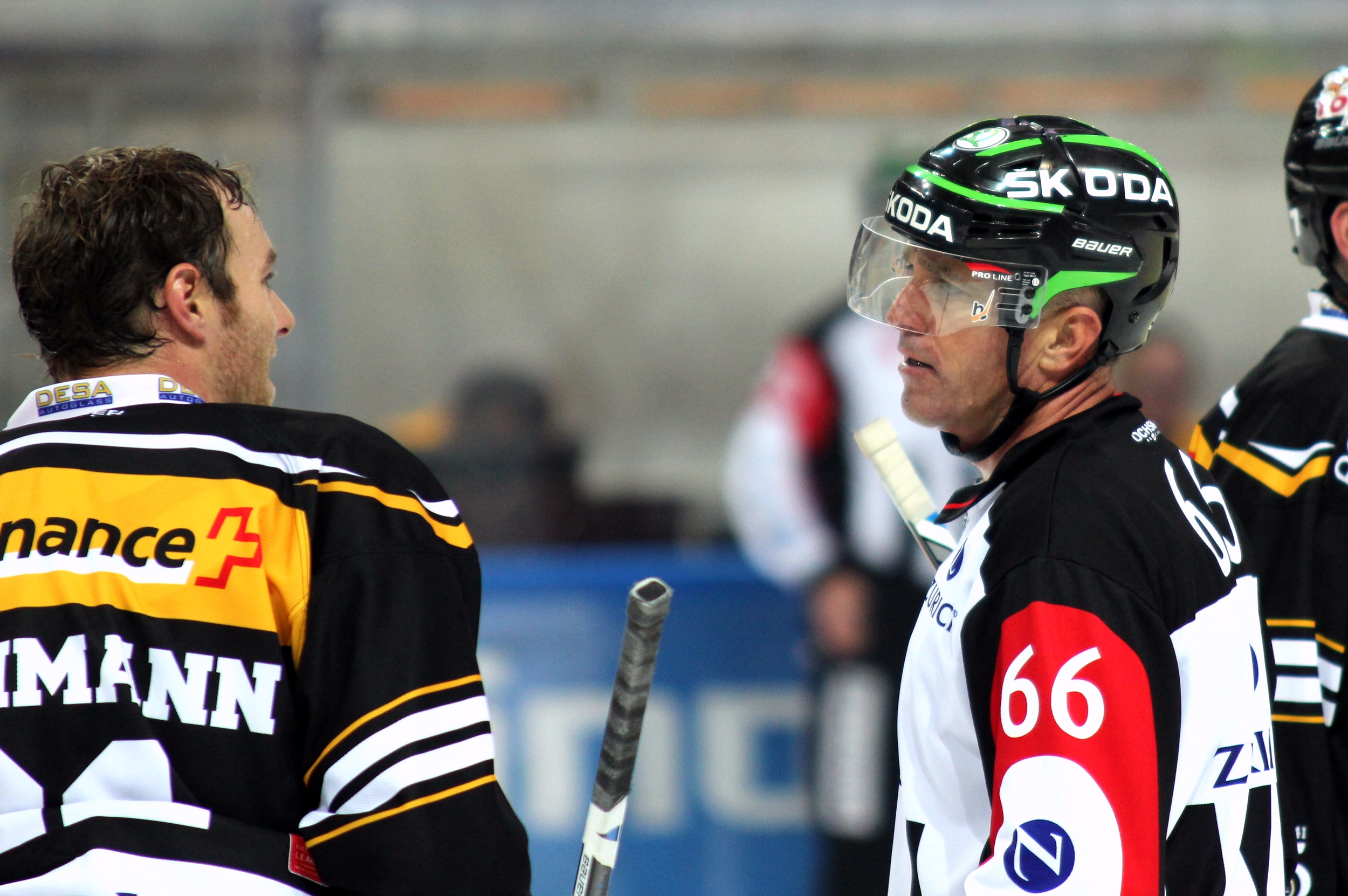
- Kurmann (R, #66) with Janick Steinman (L, #21) on ice in 2015
- Born: 10 January 1966 (age 60); Switzerland
- Occupations: Sports administrator, ice hockey official

Danny Kurmann (born 10 January 1966) is a retired ice hockey referee from Switzerland.

== Career ==
Kurmann began officiating in 1983 in amateur leagues. In 1989, he was first appointed to the Swiss National League A, in which he served as a linesman during his first three seasons. He was promoted to the position of referee in 1993. In 1997, he signed a full-time contract with the Swiss Ice Hockey Association, giving up his job as an air conditioning technician.

Danny Kurmann has officiated in several international tournaments. He officiated at the Ice Hockey World Championships (1999-2004, 2007-2009), the IIHF World U20 Championship (1999-2000, 2003, 2007-2009) and at the Olympic Games (2002, 2006, 2010). He has participated in the IIHF Referee Exchange Program since its introduction in 2004.

In April 2017, Kurmann retired from refereeing to take a job as an officiating manager with the IIHF.
