= Joonas Järvinen =

Finnish ice hockey player

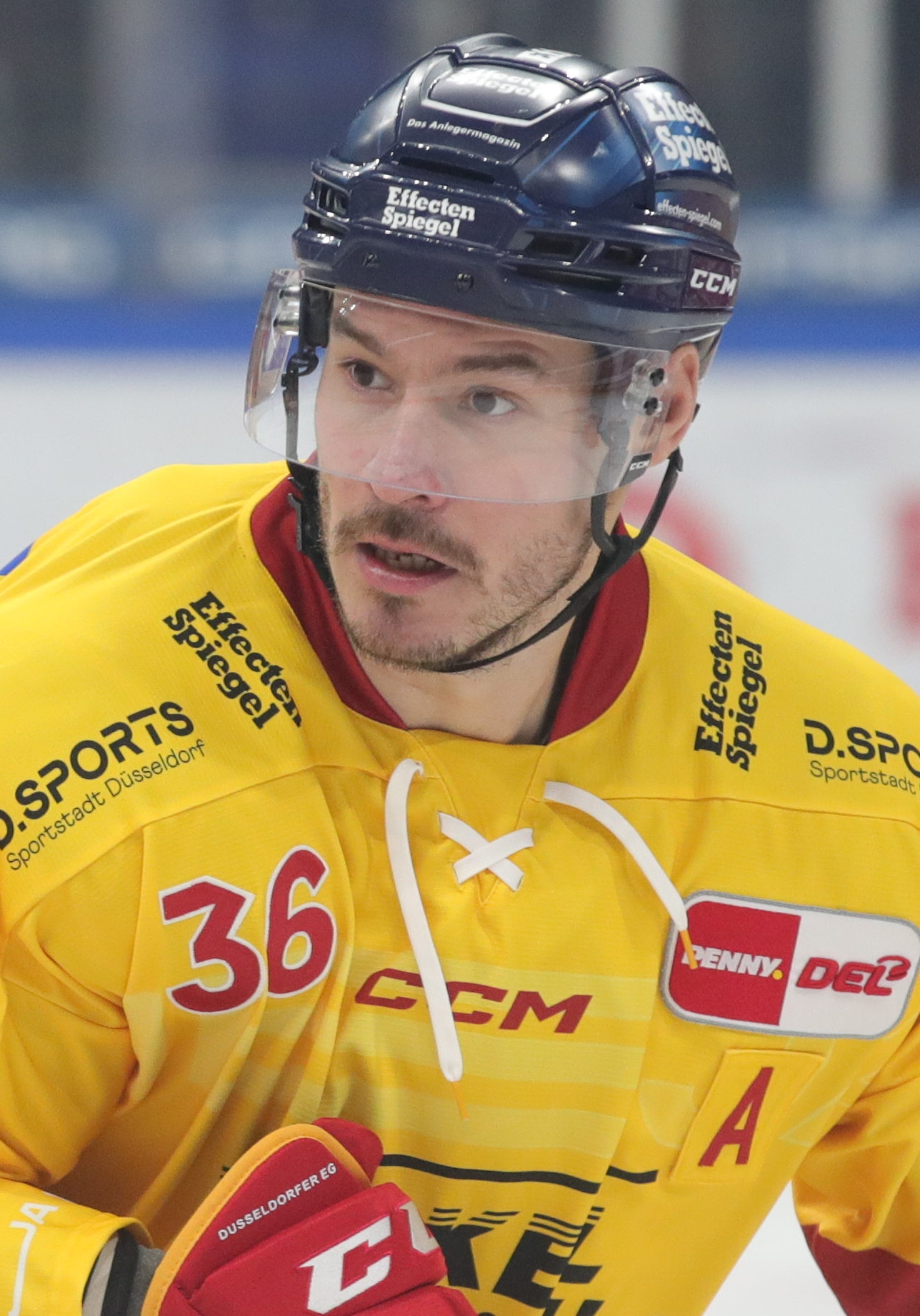
- Born: 5 January 1989 (age 37) Turku, Finland
- Height: 6 ft 3 in (191 cm)
- Weight: 220 lb (100 kg; 15 st 10 lb)
- Position: Defence
- Shoots: Left
- team Former teams: Free agent TPS; Lahti Pelicans; Milwaukee Admirals; HC Sochi; HIFK; Kunlun Red Star; Tappara; Jokerit; Ässät; Düsseldorfer EG
- National team: Finland
- NHL draft: Undrafted
- Playing career: 2007–present

Joonas Järvinen (born 5 January 1989) is a Finnish professional ice hockey player. He is currently an unrestricted free agent who most recently played with Düsseldorfer EG in the Deutsche Eishockey Liga (DEL).

== Playing career ==
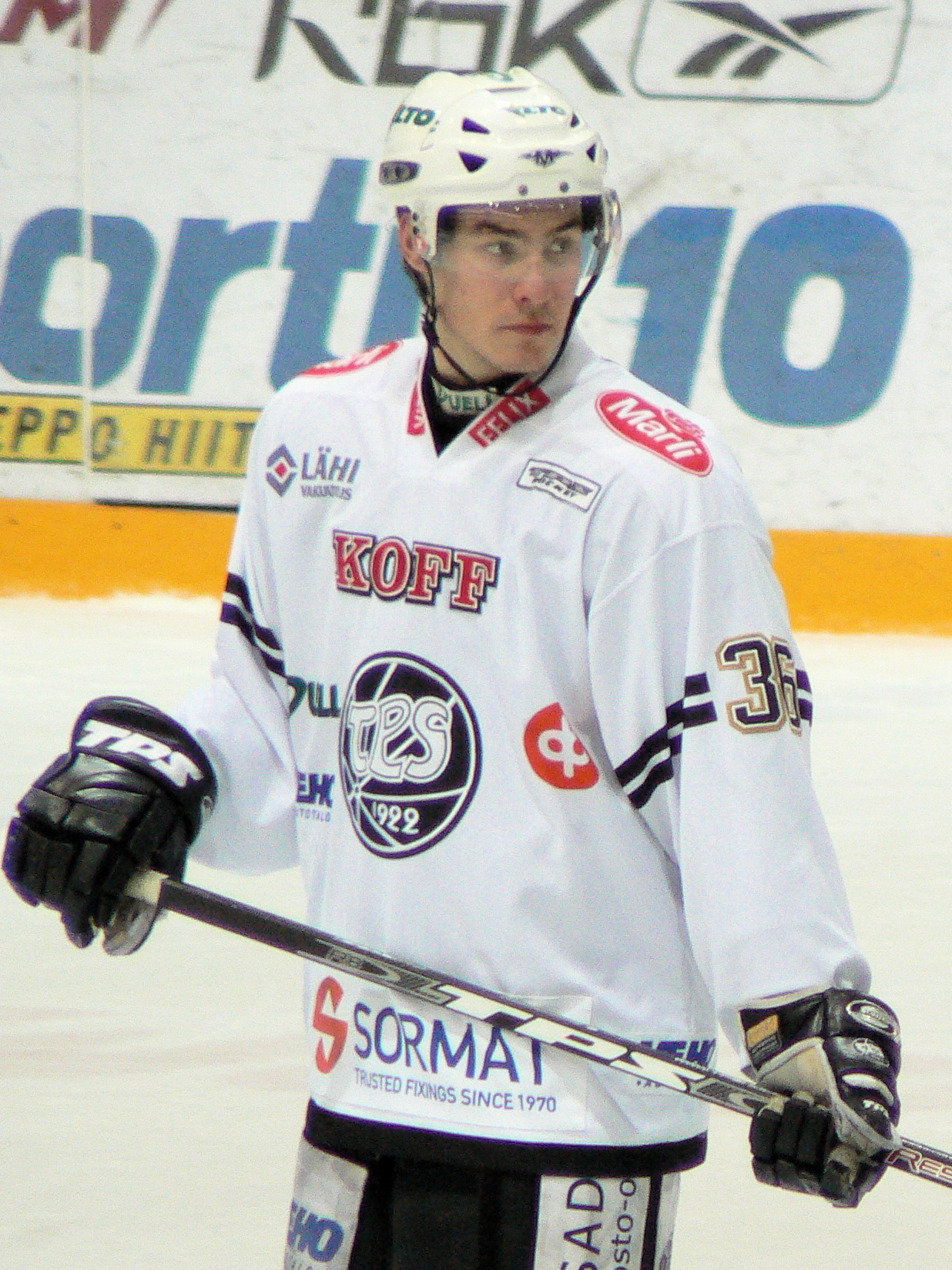
Joonas Järvinen playing for TPS in January, 2009.

He began his professional career playing in the Finnish SM-liiga with TPS and Lahti Pelicans. On 30 May 2012, he signed a two-year, two-way contract as an unrestricted free agent with Nashville Predators and played the 2012–13 season in the American Hockey League with the Milwaukee Admirals.

After a second successive season with the Admirals, Järvinen left the Predators organization and signed as a free agent on a one-year deal with Russian club, HC Sochi in the KHL.
