= Peter Hamerlík =

Slovak ice hockey player

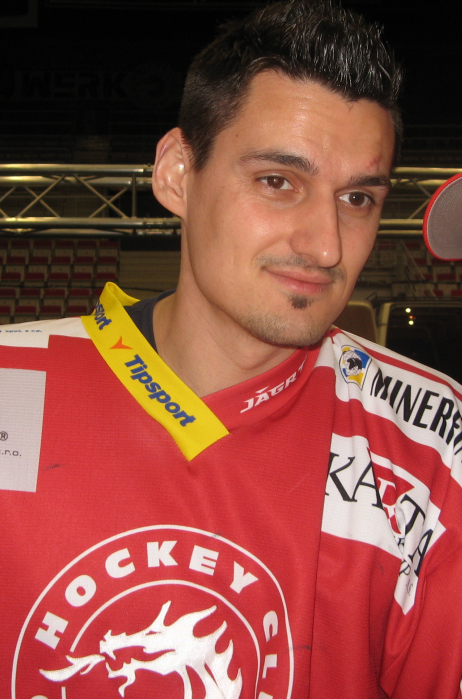
- Born: 2 January 1982 (age 44) Myjava, Czechoslovakia
- Height: 6 ft 1 in (185 cm)
- Weight: 205 lb (93 kg; 14 st 9 lb)
- Position: Goaltender
- Catches: Left
- team Former teams: Free agent HK 36 Skalica; Kingston Frontenacs; Cincinnati Cyclones; Providence Bruins; Augusta Lynx; Reading Royals; Trenton Titans; HC Dukla Senica; Khimik-SKA Novopolotsk; Kazzinc-Torpedo; HC Oceláři Třinec; Orli Znojmo; AZ Havířov; HC Frýdek-Místek; HC Dynamo Pardubice; Bratislava Capitals; HK Poprad
- National team: Slovakia
- NHL draft: 84th overall, 2000; Pittsburgh Penguins; 153rd overall, 2002; Boston Bruins
- Playing career: 2003–present

Peter Hamerlík (born 2 January 1982) is a Slovak ice hockey goaltender. He is currently a free agent.

Medal record

Ice hockey

Representing Slovakia

World Championships
Silver medal – second place	2012 Finland/Sweden	

== Career ==
Hamerlík played previously for HK 36 Skalica, Kingston Frontenacs, Cincinnati Cyclones, Providence Bruins, Augusta Lynx, Reading Royals, Trenton Devils and HC Oceláři Třinec. He also played in the 2010 IIHF World Championship as a member of the Slovakia men's national ice hockey team.

== Career statistics ==
=== International ===
Year	Team	Event	GP	W	L	T	MIN	GA	SO	GAA	SV%
