= Nicolas Besch =

French ice hockey player

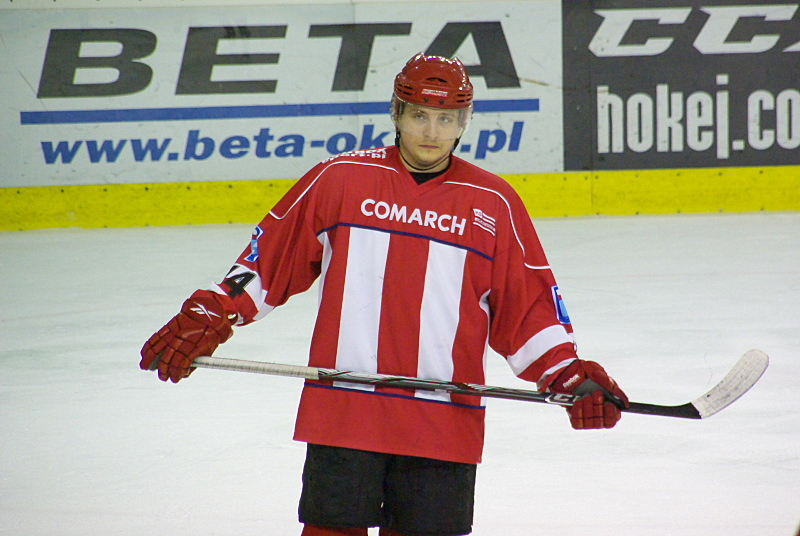
- Born: October 25, 1984 (age 41) Le Havre, France
- Height: 5 ft 10 in (178 cm)
- Weight: 192 lb (87 kg; 13 st 10 lb)
- Position: Defence
- Shoots: Left
- Ligue Magnus team Former teams: Boxers de Bordeaux; Dragons de Rouen; Leksands IF; Nyköpings Hockey; Vaasan Sport; Mikkelin Jukurit; Brûleurs de Loups; KS Cracovia; KTH Krynica; Ciarko PBS Bank KH Sanok; GKS Tychy
- National team: France
- Playing career: 2001–present

Nicolas Besch (born October 25, 1984) is a professional French ice hockey defenceman of Polish descent who currently plays for Boxers de Bordeaux of the Ligue Magnus. Outside of France, he has also played professional hockey in the Swedish Allsvenskan, the Finnish Mestis, and the Polish PHL.

He participated at the 2010 IIHF World Championship as a member of the France National men's ice hockey team.
