= Vitali Koval =

Belarusian ice hockey player

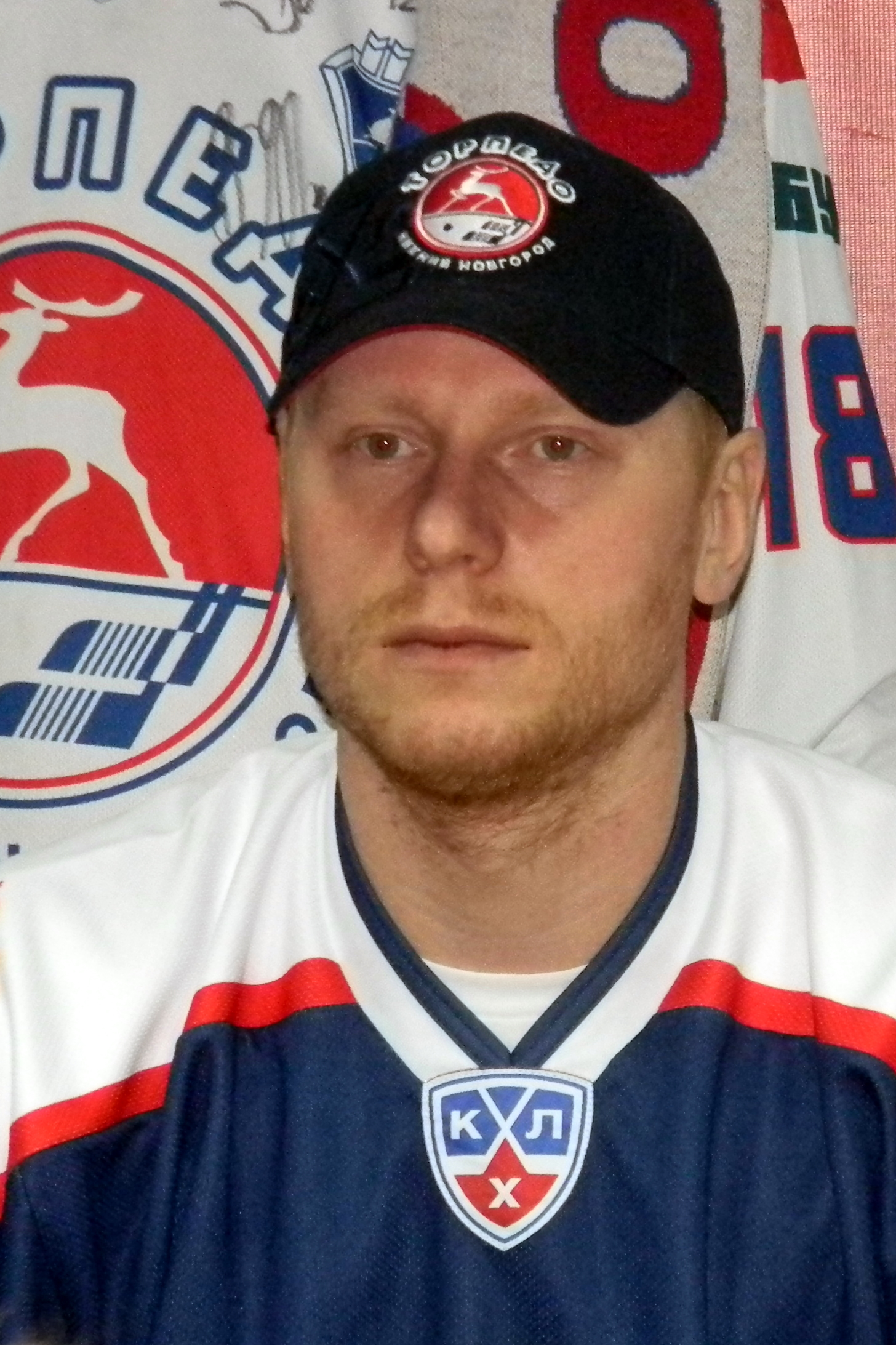
- Born: March 31, 1980 (age 44); Perm, Russian SFSR, Soviet Union
- Height: 6 ft 2 in (188 cm)
- Weight: 214 lb (97 kg; 15 st 4 lb)
- Position: Goaltender
- Caught: Left
- HAS team Former teams: VIK Västerås; Atlant Mytishchi; Dinamo Minsk; Molot-Prikamye Perm; Torpedo Nizhny Novgorod; Neftekhimik Nizhnekamsk; Salavat Yulaev Ufa
- National team: Belarus
- Playing career: 1998–2016

Vitali Nikolayevich Koval (Russian: Виталий Николаевич Коваль) (born March 31, 1980) is a Belarusian professional ice hockey goaltender. He has previously played for Molot-Prikamye Perm, Dinamo Minsk, Torpedo Nizhny Novgorod and Atlant Moscow Oblast, Salavat Yulaev Ufa with whom reached Gagarin Cup Final in 2011.

Koval was selected for the Belarus national men's ice hockey team in the 2010 Winter Olympics. He also participated at the 2010 IIHF World Championship.
