= Brent Reiber =

Swiss former ice hockey referee (born 1966)

Brent Reiber (born 31 December 1966) is a Swiss former ice hockey referee, who refereed in the Swiss National League A. Reiber was born in Lloydminster, Saskatchewan, Canada.

== Career ==
He has officiated many international tournaments including the Winter Olympics.
