= 2013 IIHF World Championship rosters =

Each team's roster for the 2013 IIHF World Championship consists of at least 15 skaters (forwards, and defencemen) and 2 goaltenders, and at most 22 skaters and 3 goaltenders. All sixteen participating nations, through the confirmation of their respective national associations, had to submit a roster by the first IIHF directorate meeting.

== Legend ==
Number	Uniform number	GP	Games played	W	Wins
F	Forward	G	Goals	L	Losses
D	Defenceman	A	Assists	Min	Minutes played
GK	Goaltender	Pts	Points	GA	Goals against
Club	Player's club before tournament	PIM	Penalties in minutes	GAA	Goals against average
		SO	Shutouts	SV%	Save percentage

== Austria ==
- Head coach: Emanuel Viveiros

A 25-player roster was announced on April 27.

=== Skaters ===
Number	Position	Player	Club	GP	G	A	Pts	PIM	+/−
4	F	Gerhard Unterluggauer	(Austria) EC VSV	5	1	0	1	2	−2
10	F	Daniel Oberkofler	(Austria) EHC Black Wings Linz	7	1	1	2	2	−4
12	F	Michael Raffl	(Sweden) Leksands IF	7	2	1	3	0	−2
14	D	Johannes Reichel	(Austria) EC KAC	2	0	0	0	2	0
15	F	Manuel Latusa	(Austria) EC Red Bull Salzburg	7	1	1	2	0	−1
18	F	Thomas Koch	(Austria) EC KAC	6	0	0	0	2	−1
20	F	Daniel Welser	(Austria) EC Red Bull Salzburg	6	1	1	2	27	−1
22	D	Thomas Pöck	(United States) Lake Erie Monsters	7	0	3	3	18	−2
23	D	Sven Klimbacher	(Austria) Vienna Capitals	3	0	0	0	0	+1
25	F	Matthias Iberer	(Austria) Graz 99ers	7	1	1	2	0	−5
26	F	Thomas Vanek	(United States) Buffalo Sabres	7	4	2	6	2	−2
27	F	Thomas Hundertpfund	(Austria) EC KAC	7	0	5	5	10	0
28	D	Martin Schumig	(Austria) EC KAC	7	0	0	0	0	−1
34	F	Markus Peintner	(Austria) EC VSV	7	0	2	2	0	−3
37	F	Andreas Kristler	(Austria) EC Red Bull Salzburg	5	0	1	1	0	−2
41	D	Mario Altmann	(Austria) EC VSV	7	1	1	2	0	−1
45	F	David Schuller	(Austria) EC KAC	7	1	1	2	6	−2
48	D	Florian Iberer	(Austria) EC KAC	7	2	0	2	0	−3
55	D	Robert Lukas	(Austria) EHC Black Wings Linz	7	1	2	3	2	−1
64	D	Andre Lakos	(Austria) Vienna Capitals	7	1	0	1	4	−3
79	F	Gregor Baumgartner	(Austria) EHC Black Wings Linz	7	0	3	3	4	−1
89	F	Raphael Herburger	(Austria) EC KAC	7	1	0	1	4	+1

=== Goaltenders ===
Number	Player	Club	GP	W	L	Min	GA	GAA	SA	SV%	SO
24	Mathias Lange	(Germany) SC Bietigheim-Bissingen	0	0	0	00:00	0	0.00	0	00.00	0
29	Bernhard Starkbaum	(Sweden) Modo Hockey	7	1	5	401:05	25	3.74	227	88.99	0
30	Rene Swette	(Austria) EC KAC	1	0	0	20:00	3	9.00	5	40.00	0

== Belarus ==
- Head coach: Andrei Skabelka

=== Skaters ===
Number	Position	Player	Club	GP	G	A	Pts	PIM	+/−
8	D	Ilya Shinkevich	(Belarus) Metallurg Zhlobin	7	0	1	1	4	−3
9	F	Vyacheslav Andryushchenko	(Belarus) Metallurg Zhlobin	7	0	1	1	2	−3
10	F	Yevgeni Solomonov	(Belarus) HK Gomel	6	0	1	1	2	+2
11	F	Alexander Kulakov	(Belarus) HC Dinamo Minsk	7	1	1	2	4	+1
12	D	Andrei Filichkin	(Belarus) HK Gomel	5	1	0	1	6	0
15	F	Artem Demkov	(Germany) Hamburg Freezers	7	0	1	1	2	+1
16	F	Mikhail Stefanovich	(Belarus) HK Gomel	6	0	0	0	2	−1
18	F	Alexei Ugarov	(Russia) Torpedo Nizhny Novgorod	7	1	1	2	0	−2
19	F	Dmitry Meleshko	(Belarus) HC Dinamo Minsk	7	0	1	1	0	+1
21	F	Alexei Yefimenko	(Belarus) HC Shakhtyor Soligorsk	6	1	0	1	2	−1
22	D	Oleg Goroshko	(Belarus) HC Dinamo Minsk	7	0	2	2	4	0
26	F	Andrei Stas	(Belarus) HC Dinamo Minsk	7	0	2	2	2	−3
27	D	Yaroslav Maslennikov	(Belarus) HK Gomel	7	0	0	0	8	−1
28	F	Konstantin Koltsov	(Russia) Atlant Moscow Oblast	7	2	0	2	0	−2
38	F	Artyom Kisly	(Belarus) HK Neman Grodno	7	0	0	0	12	0
55	D	Alexander Yeronov	(Belarus) HC Shakhtyor Soligorsk	2	0	0	0	2	−1
70	D	Ilya Kaznadey	(Belarus) Metallurg Zhlobin	6	1	1	2	4	+1
77	F	Alexander Kitarov	(Belarus) HC Dinamo Minsk	7	1	1	2	12	−1
86	D	Pavel Chernaok	(Belarus) HC Dinamo Minsk	7	0	0	0	6	−2
88	F	Evgeni Kovyrshin	(Russia) Severstal Cherepovets	7	1	1	2	0	−1
92	D	Roman Graborenko	(United States) Albany Devils	7	1	0	1	2	−1
94	F	Artur Gavrus	(Canada) Owen Sound Attack	3	0	0	0	0	−1

=== Goaltenders ===
Number	Player	Club	GP	W	L	Min	GA	GAA	SA	SV%	SO
33	Stepan Goryachevskikh	(Ukraine) HC Donbass	0	0	0	00:00	0	0.00	0	00.00	0
35	Vitali Belinski	(Belarus) Yunost Minsk	5	1	3	269:46	11	2.45	147	92.52	0
40	Dmitri Milchakov	(Belarus) Metallurg Zhlobin	3	0	3	146:18	9	3.69	87	89.66	0

== Canada ==
- Head coach: Lindy Ruff

A 22-player roster was announced on April 27.

=== Skaters ===
Number	Position	Player	Club	GP	G	A	Pts	PIM	+/−
2	D	Dan Hamhuis	(Canada) Vancouver Canucks	3	0	1	1	2	+2
3	D	Stéphane Robidas	(United States) Dallas Stars	8	0	3	3	6	+2
4	F	Taylor Hall	(Canada) Edmonton Oilers	8	2	1	3	0	+1
5	D	Brenden Dillon	(United States) Dallas Stars	8	1	0	1	0	+3
7	D	T. J. Brodie	(Canada) Calgary Flames	7	0	1	1	0	+1
8	F	Jaden Schwartz	(United States) St. Louis Blues	0	0	0	0	0	0
9	F	Matt Duchene	(United States) Colorado Avalanche	8	4	1	5	0	+3
11	F	Jordan Staal	(United States) Carolina Hurricanes	8	1	2	3	4	+5
12	F	Eric Staal	(United States) Carolina Hurricanes	8	0	3	3	4	0
14	F	Jordan Eberle	(Canada) Edmonton Oilers	8	0	5	5	2	+1
16	F	Andrew Ladd	(Canada) Winnipeg Jets	8	3	3	6	4	+3
17	F	Wayne Simmonds	(United States) Philadelphia Flyers	8	1	0	1	2	0
19	D	Justin Schultz	(Canada) Edmonton Oilers	8	0	4	4	2	+1
22	D	Luke Schenn	(United States) Philadelphia Flyers	7	1	1	2	27	+4
24	F	Matt Read	(United States) Philadelphia Flyers	8	1	2	3	2	0
28	F	Claude Giroux	(United States) Philadelphia Flyers	8	3	5	8	12	+4
44	D	Jay Harrison	(United States) Carolina Hurricanes	8	0	1	1	2	+2
51	D	Brian Campbell	(United States) Florida Panthers	8	0	2	2	0	+7
53	F	Jeff Skinner	(United States) Carolina Hurricanes	8	2	2	4	2	+4
76	D	P. K. Subban	(Canada) Montreal Canadiens	1	0	0	0	0	0
90	F	Ryan O'Reilly	(United States) Colorado Avalanche	8	1	2	3	0	+4
91	F	Steven Stamkos	(United States) Tampa Bay Lightning	8	7	5	12	6	+6

=== Goaltenders ===
Number	Player	Club	GP	W	L	Min	GA	GAA	SA	SV%	SO
40	Devan Dubnyk	(Canada) Edmonton Oilers	4	4	0	243:36	6	1.48	69	91.30	0
41	Mike Smith	(United States) Phoenix Coyotes	4	2	2	255:00	7	1.65	126	94.44	1

== Czech Republic ==
- Head coach: Alois Hadamczik

=== Skaters ===
Number	Position	Player	Club	GP	G	A	Pts	PIM	+/−
2	D	Zbyněk Michálek	(United States) Phoenix Coyotes	8	3	1	4	2	+2
3	D	Marek Židlický	(United States) New Jersey Devils	2	0	0	0	0	0
5	D	Ladislav Šmíd	(Canada) Edmonton Oilers	8	0	3	3	6	0
11	F	Petr Hubáček	(Finland) JYP Jyväskylä	8	0	4	4	4	+1
12	F	Jiří Novotný	(Czech Republic) HC Lev Praha	8	1	1	2	4	0
14	F	Tomáš Fleischmann	(United States) Florida Panthers	8	2	0	2	0	0
17	F	Radim Vrbata	(United States) Phoenix Coyotes	8	2	1	3	4	+4
19	F	Jiří Tlustý	(United States) Carolina Hurricanes	8	1	3	4	8	−1
20	F	Martin Hanzal	(United States) Phoenix Coyotes	8	1	3	4	2	+4
24	F	Zbyněk Irgl	(Belarus) HC Dinamo Minsk	8	2	1	3	0	0
25	F	Jiří Hudler	(Canada) Calgary Flames	8	4	1	5	6	−3
35	D	Jan Hejda	(United States) Colorado Avalanche	8	0	1	1	0	−1
36	D	Petr Čáslava	(Russia) Severstal Cherepovets	8	0	1	1	6	−4
41	F	Tomáš Plekanec	(Canada) Montreal Canadiens	2	0	4	4	2	+2
42	F	Petr Koukal	(Russia) HC Neftekhimik Nizhnekamsk	5	2	0	2	4	+1
43	F	Jan Kovář	(Czech Republic) HC Plzeň	6	0	0	0	2	0
62	F	Petr Tenkrát	(Czech Republic) HC Sparta Praha	8	0	0	0	2	0
80	D	Zdeněk Kutlák	(Switzerland) HC Ambrì-Piotta	8	1	0	1	0	0
85	F	Petr Vrána	(Czech Republic) HC Lev Praha	6	0	0	0	0	−2
87	D	Jakub Nakládal	(Czech Republic) HC Lev Praha	8	0	1	1	10	+2
90	F	Tomáš Hertl	(Czech Republic) HC Slavia Praha	8	0	0	0	0	−3
93	F	Jakub Voráček	(United States) Philadelphia Flyers	8	1	6	7	2	−4

=== Goaltenders ===
Number	Player	Club	GP	W	L	Min	GA	GAA	SA	SV%	SO
31	Ondřej Pavelec	(Canada) Winnipeg Jets	5	2	2	296:36	7	1.42	112	93.75	0
33	Pavel Francouz	(Czech Republic) HC Litvínov	2	0	0	07:03	0	0.00	6	100.00	0
53	Alexander Salák	(Sweden) Färjestad BK	3	1	2	176:06	6	2.04	90	93.33	1

== Denmark ==
- Head coach: Per Bäckman

=== Skaters ===
Number	Position	Player	Club	GP	G	A	Pts	PIM	+/−
3	D	Philip Larsen	(United States) Dallas Stars	6	1	1	2	4	−1
4	D	Mads Bødker	(Sweden) Malmö Redhawks	7	1	0	1	0	−2
5	D	Daniel Nielsen	(Germany) Hamburg Freezers	2	0	1	1	0	−2
6	D	Stefan Lassen	(Sweden) Malmö Redhawks	7	1	2	3	6	+1
8	F	Frederik Storm	(Sweden) Malmö Redhawks	7	0	0	0	2	−6
11	F	Patrick Bjorkstrand	(Sweden) Mora IK	7	0	0	0	2	−1
13	F	Morten Green	(Germany) Hannover Scorpions	7	3	1	4	10	+1
14	F	Kirill Starkov	(Sweden) IK Oskarshamn	7	1	1	2	4	0
15	D	Rasmus Nielsen	(Denmark) Herning Blue Fox	7	0	0	0	0	−1
17	F	Nicklas Jensen	(United States) Chicago Wolves	3	2	0	2	2	+1
19	F	Kim Staal	(Denmark) Herlev Eagles	7	1	4	5	0	+2
21	F	Thor Dresler	(Denmark) Herlev Eagles	4	0	0	0	0	0
22	D	Markus Lauridsen	(United States) Lake Erie Monsters	7	0	1	1	4	−1
25	D	Oliver Lauridsen	(United States) Philadelphia Flyers	7	0	0	0	6	0
29	F	Morten Madsen	(Sweden) Modo Hockey	7	2	2	4	2	+1
33	F	Julian Jakobsen	(Germany) Hamburg Freezers	7	0	0	0	6	+1
38	F	Morten Poulsen	(Sweden) IK Oskarshamn	7	1	0	1	2	−3
40	F	Jesper Jensen	(Sweden) Karlskrona HK	7	0	0	0	0	−5
41	D	Jesper Jensen	(Sweden) Rögle BK	7	0	1	1	8	−2
44	F	Nichlas Hardt	(Finland) Jokerit	7	0	2	2	0	−3
60	F	Mads Christensen	(Germany) Eisbären Berlin	3	0	2	2	4	+2
89	F	Mikkel Bødker	(United States) Phoenix Coyotes	7	0	3	3	0	−1

=== Goaltenders ===
Number	Player	Club	GP	W	L	Min	GA	GAA	SA	SV%	SO
1	Patrick Galbraith	(Sweden) IK Oskarshamn	3	0	3	178:25	11	3.70	91	87.91	0
31	Simon Nielsen	(Finland) Lukko	4	2	2	246:19	9	2.19	104	91.35	0
32	Sebastian Dahm	(Denmark) Rødovre Mighty Bulls	0	0	0	00:00	0	0.00	0	00.00	0

== Finland ==
- Head coach: Jukka Jalonen

=== Skaters ===
Number	Position	Player	Club	GP	G	A	Pts	PIM	+/−
2	D	Teemu Laakso	(Russia) Severstal Cherepovets	10	0	2	2	0	+4
4	D	Ossi Väänänen	(Finland) Jokerit	10	1	3	4	6	+1
5	D	Lasse Kukkonen	(Sweden) Rögle BK	10	0	0	0	0	−1
6	D	Tuukka Mäntylä	(Finland) Tappara	10	0	3	3	2	+3
10	F	Niklas Hagman	(Russia) Lokomotiv Yaroslavl	10	1	0	1	4	−1
12	F	Marko Anttila	(Finland) HC TPS	7	0	1	1	2	0
15	F	Juha-Pekka Hytönen	(Russia) Amur Khabarovsk	10	0	1	1	8	0
18	D	Sami Lepistö	(Czech Republic) HC Lev Praha	10	0	4	4	2	+3
19	F	Veli-Matti Savinainen	(Finland) Ässät	10	3	1	4	4	−3
20	F	Janne Pesonen	(Russia) Ak Bars Kazan	9	2	6	8	27	+4
21	D	Ilari Melart	(Finland) HIFK	10	0	0	0	10	−1
23	F	Sakari Salminen	(Finland) KalPa	10	1	2	3	0	+1
27	F	Petri Kontiola	(Russia) Traktor Chelyabinsk	10	8	8	16	8	+6
28	F	Lauri Korpikoski	(United States) Phoenix Coyotes	8	3	2	5	4	+1
37	F	Juha-Pekka Haataja	(Finland) Oulun Kärpät	6	0	0	0	2	+1
38	D	Juuso Hietanen	(Russia) Torpedo Nizhny Novgorod	10	0	3	3	8	+1
39	F	Ville Viitaluoma	(Finland) HPK	6	1	0	1	2	+1
40	F	Jarno Koskiranta	(Finland) Tappara	10	2	1	3	2	−2
41	F	Antti Pihlström	(Russia) Salavat Yulaev Ufa	10	2	1	3	4	+1
46	D	Janne Jalasvaara	(Russia) HC Dynamo Moscow	10	0	1	1	6	0
50	F	Juhamatti Aaltonen	(Sweden) Rögle BK	10	4	7	11	4	+3
64	F	Mikael Granlund	(United States) Minnesota Wild	4	1	2	3	0	+1

=== Goaltenders ===
Number	Player	Club	GP	W	L	Min	GA	GAA	SA	SV%	SO
31	Joni Ortio	(Finland) HIFK	3	3	0	181:58	6	1.98	58	89.66	0
32	Antti Raanta	(Finland) Ässät	7	4	3	430:15	15	2.09	208	92.79	1
35	Atte Engren	(Finland) HC TPS	0	0	0	00:00	0	0.00	0	00.00	0

== France ==
- Head coach: Dave Henderson

A 25-player roster was announced on April 30.

=== Skaters ===
Number	Position	Player	Club	GP	G	A	Pts	PIM	+/−
3	D	Vincent Bachet	(France) Gothiques d'Amiens	7	0	0	0	4	−2
4	D	Antonin Manavian	(Austria) HC TWK Innsbruck	7	0	0	0	8	−5
7	F	Yorick Treille	(Austria) EC Red Bull Salzburg	7	1	2	3	4	−2
9	F	Damien Fleury	(Sweden) Södertälje SK	7	3	1	4	2	+2
10	F	Laurent Meunier	(Germany) Straubing Tigers	5	0	2	2	4	−1
15	F	Tim Bozon	(Canada) Kamloops Blazers	5	0	1	1	0	−4
18	D	Yohann Auvitu	(Finland) JYP Jyväskylä	7	0	0	0	2	−6
22	F	Brian Henderson	(France) Ducs d'Angers	7	0	1	1	6	−2
24	F	Julien Desrosiers	(France) Dragons de Rouen	7	3	1	4	2	−1
25	F	Nicolas Ritz	(France) Ducs de Dijon	4	0	0	0	0	0
28	F	Damien Raux	(France) Scorpions de Mulhouse	7	1	0	1	2	−2
38	F	Thomas Roussel	(France) Gothiques d'Amiens	0	0	0	0	0	0
41	F	Pierre-Édouard Bellemare	(Sweden) Skellefteå AIK	7	1	3	4	0	+1
55	D	Jonathan Janil	(France) Dragons de Rouen	7	0	0	0	0	0
60	F	Antoine Roussel	(United States) Dallas Stars	7	2	1	3	10	0
71	F	Anthony Guttig	(Sweden) Tranås AIF	7	0	0	0	0	−4
74	D	Nicolas Besch	(Poland) KS Cracovia Kraków	7	0	1	1	10	+3
77	F	Sacha Treille	(Czech Republic) HC Sparta Praha	7	0	2	2	4	+2
80	F	Teddy Da Costa	(Poland) GKS Tychy	7	1	0	1	8	−4
82	F	Charles Bertrand	(Finland) Lukko Rauma	7	0	1	1	2	−2
84	D	Kevin Hecquefeuille	(Sweden) Karlskrona HK	7	1	2	3	2	−3
90	D	Maxime Moisand	(Denmark) Odense Bulldogs	7	0	0	0	0	+1

=== Goaltenders ===
Number	Player	Club	GP	W	L	Min	GA	GAA	SA	SV%	SO
39	Cristobal Huet	(Switzerland) Lausanne HC	5	1	4	285:32	16	3.36	164	90.24	0
42	Fabrice Lhenry	(France) Dragons de Rouen	2	0	1	62:02	3	2.90	26	88.46	0
49	Florian Hardy	(France) Ducs d'Angers	2	1	0	72:26	2	1.66	32	93.75	0

== Germany ==
- Head coach: Pat Cortina

A 25-player roster was announced on April 27.

=== Skaters ===
Number	Position	Player	Club	GP	G	A	Pts	PIM	+/−
3	D	Justin Krueger	(United States) Charlotte Checkers	4	0	0	0	0	0
10	D	Christian Ehrhoff	(United States) Buffalo Sabres	7	3	2	5	10	0
15	D	Jens Baxmann	(Germany) Eisbären Berlin	6	0	0	0	4	−1
16	F	Michael Wolf	(Germany) Iserlohn Roosters	7	2	2	4	0	0
17	F	Marcus Kink	(Germany) Adler Mannheim	7	3	0	3	4	+1
21	F	John Tripp	(Germany) Kölner Haie	7	1	1	2	2	0
24	F	André Rankel	(Germany) Eisbären Berlin	6	0	1	1	0	−3
28	F	Frank Mauer	(Germany) Adler Mannheim	6	0	0	0	0	−1
34	D	Benedikt Kohl	(Germany) EHC Wolfsburg	4	0	1	1	0	0
36	F	Yannic Seidenberg	(Germany) Adler Mannheim	7	0	0	0	4	+1
39	F	Thomas Greilinger	(Germany) ERC Ingolstadt	7	0	1	1	0	−1
47	F	Christoph Ullmann	(Germany) Adler Mannheim	7	1	1	2	2	0
48	D	Frank Hördler	(Germany) Eisbären Berlin	7	0	0	0	4	−1
50	F	Patrick Hager	(Germany) ERC Ingolstadt	7	1	0	1	6	−1
55	F	Felix Schütz	(Germany) Kölner Haie	7	1	0	1	6	−2
57	F	Marcel Goc	(United States) Florida Panthers	7	0	4	4	4	−4
77	D	Nikolai Goc	(Germany) Adler Mannheim	7	0	2	2	4	+1
81	D	Torsten Ankert	(Germany) Kölner Haie	7	1	0	1	4	−2
86	F	Daniel Pietta	(Germany) Krefeld Pinguine	5	0	0	0	0	−1
87	F	Philip Gogulla	(Germany) Kölner Haie	7	0	3	3	2	+1
91	D	Moritz Müller	(Germany) Kölner Haie	7	0	0	0	2	0
92	F	Marcel Noebels	(United States) Adirondack Phantoms	3	0	0	0	0	0

=== Goaltenders ===
Number	Player	Club	GP	W	L	Min	GA	GAA	SA	SV%	SO
33	Danny aus den Birken	(Germany) Kölner Haie	0	0	0	00:00	0	0.00	0	00.00	0
44	Dennis Endras	(Germany) Adler Mannheim	2	0	2	118:54	6	3.03	54	88.89	0
72	Rob Zepp	(Germany) Eisbären Berlin	5	3	2	302:05	9	1.79	153	94.12	2

== Latvia ==
- Head coach: Ted Nolan

=== Skaters ===
Number	Position	Player	Club	GP	G	A	Pts	PIM	+/−
2	D	Agris Saviels	(Ukraine) HC Kompanion-Naftogaz	5	1	0	1	2	−2
5	F	Jānis Sprukts	(Russia) HC CSKA Moscow	7	1	5	6	2	0
10	F	Lauris Dārziņš	(Russia) Ak Bars Kazan	7	5	1	6	2	+2
11	D	Kristaps Sotnieks	(Latvia) Dinamo Riga	7	0	0	0	12	+2
15	F	Ronalds Ķēniņš	(Switzerland) ZSC Lions	7	0	1	1	6	−5
17	D	Māris Jass	(Germany) Hannover Scorpions	7	0	0	0	8	−2
21	F	Armands Bērziņš	(Ukraine) HC Kompanion-Naftogaz	7	1	0	1	27	−4
22	D	Jānis Andersons	(Ukraine) HC Kompanion-Naftogaz	7	0	1	1	4	0
25	F	Andris Džeriņš	(Latvia) Dinamo Riga	7	0	2	2	4	−1
26	D	Krišjānis Rēdlihs	(Latvia) Dinamo Riga	7	0	0	0	0	−5
29	D	Ralfs Freibergs	(United States) Bowling Green State Univ.	7	0	1	1	4	−2
32	D	Artūrs Kulda	(Canada) Winnipeg Jets	7	1	1	2	8	−5
42	F	Vitalijs Pavlovs	(Latvia) Dinamo Riga	6	0	0	0	2	−1
47	F	Mārtiņš Cipulis	(Czech Republic) HC Lev Praha	7	2	2	4	29	+1
59	F	Zemgus Girgensons	(United States) Rochester Americans	5	1	0	1	0	−3
60	F	Juris Štāls	(Slovakia) HK Poprad	7	0	0	0	4	−4
70	F	Miks Indrašis	(Latvia) Dinamo Riga	7	0	1	1	0	−5
71	F	Aleksejs Širokovs	(Switzerland) HC Red Ice	7	0	0	0	2	−4
81	D	Georgijs Pujacs	(Russia) Avangard Omsk	2	0	0	0	2	−2
87	F	Gints Meija	(Latvia) Dinamo Riga	5	1	2	3	4	+2
90	F	Koba Jass	(Czech Republic) HC Kladno	4	0	1	1	0	+1
91	F	Roberts Jekimovs	(Finland) SaiPa	6	1	0	1	2	−3

=== Goaltenders ===
Number	Player	Club	GP	W	L	Min	GA	GAA	SA	SV%	SO
1	Māris Jučers	(Latvia) Dinamo Riga	1	0	1	40:00	4	6.00	24	83.33	0
31	Edgars Masaļskis	(Russia) HC Yugra	3	0	2	140:00	12	5.14	61	80.33	0
50	Kristers Gudļevskis	(Latvia) HK Rīga	4	2	2	243:46	9	2.22	120	92.50	0

== Norway ==
- Head coach: Roy Johansen

=== Skaters ===
Number	Position	Player	Club	GP	G	A	Pts	PIM	+/−
4	D	Daniel Sørvik	(Norway) Vålerenga Ishockey	6	0	0	0	4	−1
6	D	Jonas Holøs	(Sweden) Växjö Lakers	7	0	0	0	4	−6
8	F	Mads Hansen	(Sweden) Brynäs IF	7	1	0	1	6	−2
9	F	Marius Holtet	(Sweden) Färjestad BK	6	1	0	1	6	−3
10	F	Lars Erik Spets	(Norway) Lørenskog IK	7	0	0	0	2	−3
19	F	Per-Åge Skrøder	(Sweden) Modo Hockey	7	2	1	3	2	−5
20	F	Anders Bastiansen	(Sweden) Färjestad BK	7	4	1	5	0	+1
21	D	Morten Ask	(Norway) Vålerenga Ishockey	7	0	1	1	4	−4
22	F	Martin Røymark	(Sweden) Färjestad BK	7	0	1	1	4	−3
23	D	Mats Trygg	(Sweden) HV71	7	1	2	3	2	−7
24	F	Andreas Martinsen	(Germany) Düsseldorfer EG	7	0	0	0	25	−5
26	F	Kristian Forsberg	(Sweden) Modo Hockey	7	0	2	2	2	−3
28	F	Niklas Roest	(Norway) Sparta Warriors	7	0	0	0	2	0
39	D	Henrik Solberg	(Norway) Stavanger Oilers	4	0	0	0	2	−4
40	F	Ken André Olimb	(Sweden) BIK Karlskoga	7	1	3	4	4	0
41	F	Patrick Thoresen	(Russia) SKA Saint Petersburg	7	1	1	2	16	−6
42	D	Henrik Ødegaard	(Norway) Sparta Warriors	7	0	0	0	4	−3
45	D	Robin Dahlstrøm	(Sweden) IF Troja/Ljungby	5	0	0	0	2	0
46	F	Mathis Olimb	(Sweden) Frölunda HC	7	0	4	4	0	−1
47	D	Alexander Bonsaksen	(Sweden) Rögle BK	7	0	1	1	2	−2
51	D	Mats Rosseli Olsen	(Sweden) Frölunda HC	2	0	0	0	0	−2
55	D	Ole-Kristian Tollefsen	(Sweden) Färjestad BK	5	1	0	1	8	−3

=== Goaltenders ===
Number	Player	Club	GP	W	L	Min	GA	GAA	SA	SV%	SO
30	Lars Haugen	(Belarus) HC Dinamo Minsk	6	3	3	310:57	14	2.70	164	91.46	0
34	Lars Volden	(Finland) Espoo Blues	2	0	1	107:54	11	6.12	62	82.26	0
70	Steffen Søberg	(Norway) Vålerenga Ishockey	0	0	0	00:00	0	0.00	0	00.00	0

== Russia ==
- Head coach: Zinetula Bilyaletdinov

=== Skaters ===
Number	Position	Player	Club	GP	G	A	Pts	PIM	+/−
5	D	Ilya Nikulin	(Russia) Ak Bars Kazan	8	1	3	4	2	0
6	D	Denis Denisov	(Russia) HC CSKA Moscow	8	1	1	2	4	+8
7	D	Anton Belov	(Russia) Avangard Omsk	8	1	3	4	4	+8
8	F	Alexander Ovechkin	(United States) Washington Capitals	1	1	1	2	0	−2
10	F	Sergei Mozyakin	(Russia) Metallurg Magnitogorsk	8	1	3	4	2	+1
15	F	Alexander Svitov	(Russia) Salavat Yulaev Ufa	5	1	2	3	4	+2
21	F	Andrei Loktionov	(United States) New Jersey Devils	7	0	1	1	0	+6
22	D	Nikita Zaitsev	(Russia) HC Sibir Novosibirsk	3	1	0	1	0	+1
23	F	Denis Kokarev	(Russia) HC Dynamo Moscow	8	1	1	2	0	+1
24	F	Alexander Popov	(Russia) Avangard Omsk	8	0	4	4	0	+4
27	F	Alexei Tereshchenko	(Russia) Ak Bars Kazan	8	1	4	5	2	−2
37	F	Alexander Perezhogin	(Russia) Avangard Omsk	8	3	1	4	2	+3
42	F	Artyom Anisimov	(United States) Columbus Blue Jackets	8	0	1	1	6	+2
47	F	Alexander Radulov	(Russia) HC CSKA Moscow	8	5	5	10	6	+4
48	D	Evgeny Biryukov	(Russia) Metallurg Magnitogorsk	8	1	1	2	4	0
50	F	Sergei Soin	(Russia) HC Dynamo Moscow	8	1	3	4	2	0
51	D	Fedor Tyutin	(United States) Columbus Blue Jackets	8	0	1	1	8	0
71	F	Ilya Kovalchuk	(United States) New Jersey Devils	8	8	5	13	29	+5
77	D	Evgeny Ryasensky	(Russia) HC CSKA Moscow	5	1	0	1	2	+1
82	D	Yevgeny Medvedev	(Russia) Ak Bars Kazan	8	2	5	7	6	0
90	F	Kirill Petrov	(Russia) Ak Bars Kazan	8	1	4	5	0	+1
92	F	Evgeny Kuznetsov	(Russia) Traktor Chelyabinsk	3	1	0	1	2	+1

=== Goaltenders ===
Number	Player	Club	GP	W	L	Min	GA	GAA	SA	SV%	SO
1	Semyon Varlamov	(United States) Colorado Avalanche	4	2	1	200:44	12	3.59	98	87.76	0
30	Ilya Bryzgalov	(United States) Philadelphia Flyers	4	3	1	218:12	8	2.20	81	90.12	1
83	Vasili Koshechkin	(Russia) Severstal Cherepovets	1	0	1	58:58	2	2.04	19	89.47	0

== Slovakia ==
- Head coach: Vladimír Vůjtek

A 25-player roster was announced on April 29.

=== Skaters ===
Number	Position	Player	Club	GP	G	A	Pts	PIM	+/−
7	D	Marek Ďaloga	(Czech Republic) HC Pardubice	4	0	1	1	0	−1
8	D	Michal Sersen	(Slovakia) HC Slovan Bratislava	8	0	2	2	6	+1
12	D	Ivan Švarný	(Slovakia) HC Slovan Bratislava	4	0	0	0	4	+1
15	F	Jozef Stümpel	(Slovakia) HK Nitra	4	0	0	0	2	−1
16	F	Roman Kukumberg	(Slovakia) HC Slovan Bratislava	8	0	7	7	0	+1
18	F	Miroslav Šatan	(Slovakia) HC Slovan Bratislava	8	1	2	3	2	0
19	F	Michel Miklík	(Slovakia) HC Slovan Bratislava	8	2	2	4	2	+1
20	F	Marko Daňo	(Slovakia) HC Slovan Bratislava	5	1	1	2	4	−1
21	F	Libor Hudáček	(Slovakia) HC Slovan Bratislava	8	1	2	3	4	−1
23	D	René Vydarený	(Czech Republic) HC České Budějovice	8	2	0	2	0	+1
24	D	Branislav Mezei	(Russia) Avtomobilist Yekaterinburg	7	0	4	4	6	+4
27	F	Martin Bartek	(Czech Republic) HC Pardubice	8	1	0	1	0	0
43	F	Tomáš Surový	(Czech Republic) HC Lev Praha	8	3	1	4	0	+4
44	D	Andrej Sekera	(United States) Buffalo Sabres	8	1	1	2	2	0
55	F	Mário Bližňák	(Slovakia) HC Slovan Bratislava	8	1	1	2	6	−4
56	D	Vladimír Mihálik	(Slovakia) HC Slovan Bratislava	8	0	1	1	4	−5
67	F	Tomáš Záborský	(Russia) Avangard Omsk	8	4	2	6	4	+1
68	D	Milan Jurčina	(Finland) Lukko	8	0	2	2	6	+1
82	F	Tomáš Kopecký	(United States) Florida Panthers	8	0	2	2	6	+2
85	F	Peter Ölvecký	(Slovakia) HC Slovan Bratislava	8	1	0	1	4	+1
87	F	Marcel Haščák	(Slovakia) HC Košice	4	0	0	0	2	−3
92	F	Branko Radivojevič	(Russia) HC Spartak Moscow	8	3	2	5	2	+2

=== Goaltenders ===
Number	Player	Club	GP	W	L	Min	GA	GAA	SA	SV%	SO
31	Rastislav Staňa	(Russia) HC CSKA Moscow	7	3	3	381:54	16	2.51	169	90.53	0
32	Jaroslav Janus	(Slovakia) HC Slovan Bratislava	2	0	2	100:00	5	3.00	40	87.50	0
39	Július Hudáček	(Russia) HC Sibir Novosibirsk	0	0	0	00:00	0	0.00	0	00.00	0

== Slovenia ==
- Head coach: Matjaž Kopitar

=== Skaters ===
Number	Position	Player	Club	GP	G	A	Pts	PIM	+/−
4	D	Andrej Tavželj	(France) Dragons de Rouen	7	0	0	0	4	−3
7	D	Klemen Pretnar	(Austria) EC VSV	7	0	1	1	0	−4
8	F	Žiga Jeglič	(Sweden) Södertälje SK	7	1	1	2	0	−3
9	F	Tomaž Razingar	(Germany) EV Ravensburg	7	2	0	2	2	0
12	F	David Rodman	(Germany) SC Bietigheim-Bissingen	7	0	3	3	4	−4
13	F	Gašper Kopitar	(Sweden) Mora IK	4	0	1	1	0	0
15	D	Blaž Gregorc	(Denmark) Odense Bulldogs	7	0	3	3	2	0
16	F	Aleš Mušič	(Slovenia) HDD Olimpija Ljubljana	6	0	0	0	2	−2
17	D	Žiga Pavlin	(Sweden) Rögle BK	7	0	1	1	2	−4
19	F	Žiga Pance	(Slovenia) HDD Olimpija Ljubljana	7	0	0	0	4	−2
20	F	Gal Koren	(Croatia) KHL Medveščak	2	0	0	0	0	−1
22	F	Marcel Rodman	(Germany) SC Bietigheim-Bissingen	7	1	0	1	2	−5
24	F	Rok Tičar	(Germany) Kölner Haie	7	3	3	6	4	0
26	F	Jan Urbas	(Sweden) Växjö Lakers	7	2	0	2	2	−7
28	F	Aleš Kranjc	(Germany) Kölner Haie	7	0	0	0	10	−5
51	D	Mitja Robar	(Germany) Krefeld Pinguine	7	0	2	2	2	−2
55	F	Robert Sabolič	(Germany) ERC Ingolstadt	7	2	1	3	4	+1
58	D	Luka Tošić	(Italy) Alleghe Hockey	3	0	1	1	4	0
71	F	Boštjan Goličič	(France) Diables Rouges de Briançon	7	0	0	0	2	−2
76	F	Rok Pajič	(Italy) HC Pustertal Wölfe	7	1	2	3	2	0
86	D	Sabahudin Kovačevič	(Slovakia) HK Poprad	7	0	0	0	6	0
96	F	Luka Bašič	(France) Gothiques d'Amiens	6	0	0	0	0	−1

=== Goaltenders ===
Number	Player	Club	GP	W	L	Min	GA	GAA	SA	SV%	SO
1	Andrej Hočevar	(Ukraine) Sokil Kyiv	1	0	1	40:00	6	9.00	29	79.31	0
33	Robert Kristan	(Croatia) KHL Medveščak	5	0	4	259:46	14	3.23	110	87.27	0
40	Luka Gračnar	(Austria) EC Red Bull Salzburg	3	0	2	123:05	6	2.92	79	92.41	0

== Sweden ==
- Head coach: Pär Mårts

=== Skaters ===
Number	Position	Player	Club	GP	G	A	Pts	PIM	+/−
4	D	Staffan Kronwall	(Russia) Lokomotiv Yaroslavl	10	0	1	1	4	+3
7	D	Henrik Tallinder	(United States) New Jersey Devils	10	1	2	3	18	+7
8	D	Petter Granberg	(Sweden) Skellefteå AIK	10	0	1	1	2	0
10	D	Johan Fransson	(Sweden) Luleå HF	10	1	4	5	4	−2
11	F	Simon Hjalmarsson	(Sweden) Linköpings HC	10	2	2	4	4	+3
12	F	Fredrik Pettersson	(Ukraine) HC Donbass	9	3	4	7	4	+6
15	F	Oscar Lindberg	(Sweden) Skellefteå AIK	10	1	1	2	2	+1
19	F	Calle Järnkrok	(Sweden) Brynäs IF	10	0	1	1	4	−2
20	F	Joel Lundqvist	(Sweden) Frölunda HC	10	0	3	3	6	+4
21	F	Loui Eriksson	(United States) Dallas Stars	10	5	5	10	0	+4
22	F	Daniel Sedin	(Canada) Vancouver Canucks	4	1	5	6	2	+2
23	F	Niklas Persson	(Russia) HC CSKA Moscow	9	0	2	2	2	+1
24	D	Alexander Edler	(Canada) Vancouver Canucks	2	0	1	1	25	+2
27	F	Jimmie Ericsson	(Sweden) Skellefteå AIK	7	1	0	1	6	0
28	F	Dick Axelsson	(Sweden) Frölunda HC	8	0	3	3	4	+1
29	D	Erik Gustafsson	(United States) Philadelphia Flyers	10	1	1	2	2	+7
33	F	Henrik Sedin	(Canada) Vancouver Canucks	4	4	5	9	2	+4
44	F	Nicklas Danielsson	(Czech Republic) HC Lev Praha	10	1	2	3	14	−2
67	F	Martin Thörnberg	(Russia) Torpedo Nizhny Novgorod	10	2	1	3	2	−1
91	F	Andreas Jämtin	(Sweden) HV71	10	1	0	1	4	+1
81‡	D	Elias Fälth	(Sweden) HV71	7	1	0	1	0	+1
92	F	Gabriel Landeskog	(United States) Colorado Avalanche	10	3	1	4	18	+4

=== Goaltenders ===
Number	Player	Club	GP	W	L	Min	GA	GAA	SA	SV%	SO
1	Jhonas Enroth	(United States) Buffalo Sabres	7	5	1	418:29	8	1.15	183	95.63	2
25	Jacob Markström	(United States) Florida Panthers	5	2	0	190:12	5	1.58	76	93.42	0
37	Johan Gustafsson	(Sweden) Luleå HF	0	0	0	00:00	0	0.00	0	00.00	0

‡ Elias Fälth started the tournament with number 33, but changed to 81 following the inclusion of Henrik Sedin.

== Switzerland ==
- Head coach: Sean Simpson

A 25-player roster was announced on April 28.

=== Skaters ===
Number	Position	Player	Club	GP	G	A	Pts	PIM	+/−
3	D	Julien Vauclair	(Switzerland) HC Lugano	10	0	3	3	2	+8
5	D	Severin Blindenbacher	(Switzerland) ZSC Lions	10	0	1	1	12	+2
10	F	Andres Ambühl	(Switzerland) ZSC Lions	10	2	4	6	16	+1
12	F	Luca Cunti	(Switzerland) ZSC Lions	10	2	3	5	2	+3
16	D	Raphael Diaz	(Canada) Montreal Canadiens	4	0	1	1	0	0
17	F	Thibaut Monnet	(Switzerland) ZSC Lions	1	0	0	0	0	0
22	F	Nino Niederreiter	(United States) Bridgeport Sound Tigers	10	5	3	8	2	+3
23	F	Simon Bodenmann	(Switzerland) Kloten Flyers	10	2	3	5	2	+1
24	F	Reto Suri	(Switzerland) EV Zug	10	5	3	8	8	+3
28	F	Martin Plüss	(Switzerland) SC Bern	10	0	6	6	4	+6
31	D	Mathias Seger	(Switzerland) ZSC Lions	10	0	2	2	6	+8
43	F	Morris Trachsler	(Switzerland) ZSC Lions	10	0	1	1	4	+3
48	F	Matthias Bieber	(Switzerland) Kloten Flyers	10	2	1	3	2	+1
51	F	Ryan Gardner	(Switzerland) SC Bern	10	2	3	5	0	+1
54	D	Philippe Furrer	(Switzerland) SC Bern	10	0	1	1	4	+3
58	D	Eric Blum	(Switzerland) Kloten Flyers	9	0	1	1	2	0
70	F	Denis Hollenstein	(Switzerland) Kloten Flyers	10	4	4	8	2	+4
72	D	Patrick von Gunten	(Switzerland) Kloten Flyers	10	1	1	2	0	+2
82	F	Simon Moser	(Switzerland) SCL Tigers	10	3	2	5	6	+5
90	D	Roman Josi	(United States) Nashville Predators	10	4	5	9	4	+2
91	D	Robin Grossmann	(Switzerland) HC Davos	6	0	0	0	2	+1
95	F	Julian Walker	(Switzerland) Genève-Servette HC	10	3	5	8	8	+5

=== Goaltenders ===
Number	Player	Club	GP	W	L	Min	GA	GAA	SA	SV%	SO
20	Reto Berra	(Switzerland) EHC Biel	4	4	0	240:00	4	1.00	122	96.72	1
26	Martin Gerber	(Sweden) Rögle BK	6	4	1	364:51	11	1.81	143	92.31	0

== United States ==
- Head coach: Joe Sacco

A 23-player roster was announced on April 27.

=== Skaters ===
Number	Position	Player	Club	GP	G	A	Pts	PIM	+/−
2	D	Jeff Petry	(Canada) Edmonton Oilers	10	0	0	0	4	−3
4	D	Jamie McBain	(United States) Carolina Hurricanes	10	0	2	2	2	−2
6	D	Erik Johnson	(United States) Colorado Avalanche	10	2	2	4	20	+5
7	F	Danny Kristo	(Canada) Hamilton Bulldogs	10	1	2	3	2	−1
8	D	Jacob Trouba	(Canada) Winnipeg Jets	7	1	2	3	2	−1
11	F	Stephen Gionta	(United States) New Jersey Devils	10	3	0	3	2	−2
12	F	Bobby Butler	(United States) Nashville Predators	8	3	1	4	2	+1
14	F	Nick Bjugstad	(United States) Florida Panthers	10	0	2	2	0	−2
15	F	Craig Smith	(United States) Nashville Predators	10	4	10	14	18	+5
17	F	Aaron Palushaj	(United States) Colorado Avalanche	10	1	1	2	12	−1
18	F	David Moss	(United States) Phoenix Coyotes	10	4	3	7	4	+5
19	F	Tim Stapleton	(Belarus) HC Dinamo Minsk	10	2	3	5	2	−1
20	F	Ryan Carter	(United States) New Jersey Devils	10	1	1	2	10	0
21	F	Drew LeBlanc	(United States) Chicago Blackhawks	6	0	3	3	0	+1
22	D	Matt Hunwick	(United States) Colorado Avalanche	10	2	2	4	2	+9
25	D	Matt Carle	(United States) Tampa Bay Lightning	10	0	2	2	0	0
26	F	Paul Stastny	(United States) Colorado Avalanche	10	7	8	15	6	+7
27	D	Justin Faulk	(United States) Carolina Hurricanes	10	0	6	6	2	+1
32	F	Alex Galchenyuk	(Canada) Montreal Canadiens	4	2	0	2	0	−3
34	D	Chris Butler	(Canada) Calgary Flames	10	0	2	2	0	−1
44	F	Nate Thompson	(United States) Tampa Bay Lightning	10	1	2	3	8	+1
74	F	T. J. Oshie	(United States) St. Louis Blues	4	1	0	1	2	−1

=== Goaltenders ===
Number	Player	Club	GP	W	L	Min	GA	GAA	SA	SV%	SO
30	Ben Bishop	(United States) Tampa Bay Lightning	5	3	2	296:54	14	2.83	113	87.61	0
35	John Gibson	(Canada) Kitchener Rangers	5	4	1	308:00	8	1.56	164	95.12	1
39	Cal Heeter	(United States) Adirondack Phantoms	0	0	0	00:00	0	0.00	0	00.00	0
