= 2012 IIHF World Championship rosters =

Each team's roster for the 2012 IIHF World Championship consists of at least 15 skaters (forwards, and defencemen) and 2 goaltenders, and at most 22 skaters and 3 goaltenders. All sixteen participating nations, through the confirmation of their respective national associations, had to submit a roster by the first IIHF directorate meeting.

== Legend ==
| Number | Uniform number | GP | Games played | W | Wins |
| F | Forward | G | Goals | L | Losses |
| D | Defenceman | A | Assists | Min | Minutes played |
| GK | Goaltender | Pts | Points | GA | Goals against |
| Club | Player's club before tournament | PIM | Penalties in minutes | GAA | Goals against average |
| | | SO | Shutouts | SV% | Save percentage |

== Belarus ==
- Head coach: Kari Heikkilä (FIN)

=== Skaters ===
| Number | Position | Player | Club | GP | G | A | Pts | PIM | +/− |
|---|---|---|---|---|---|---|---|---|---|
| 82 | D | Pavel Chernook | HC Shakhtyor Soligorsk | 7 | 0 | 0 | 0 | 0 | −3 |
| 7 | D | Vladimir Denisov – C | HC Dinamo Minsk | 7 | 0 | 1 | 1 | 10 | −3 |
| 13 | F | Sergei Drozd | HC Dinamo Minsk | 6 | 0 | 0 | 0 | 2 | −3 |
| 22 | D | Oleg Goroshko | HC Dinamo Minsk | 7 | 0 | 1 | 1 | 2 | −6 |
| 92 | D | Roman Graborenko | Drummondville Voltigeurs | 7 | 0 | 1 | 1 | 0 | −1 |
| 84 | F | Mikhail Grabovski – A | Toronto Maple Leafs | 7 | 1 | 3 | 4 | 4 | −2 |
| 71 | F | Alexei Kalyuzhny – A | Avangard Omsk | 7 | 3 | 2 | 5 | 2 | −4 |
| 77 | F | Alexander Kitarov | HC Dinamo Minsk | 6 | 0 | 0 | 0 | 14 | −5 |
| 8 | F | Andrei Kolosov | HK Gomel | 6 | 0 | 0 | 0 | 2 | −4 |
| 28 | F | Konstantin Koltsov | Salavat Yulaev Ufa | 7 | 2 | 0 | 2 | 8 | 0 |
| 89 | D | Dmitry Korobov | HC Dinamo Minsk | 7 | 0 | 3 | 3 | 4 | −3 |
| 23 | F | Andrei Kostitsyn | Nashville Predators | 3 | 0 | 2 | 2 | 27 | −3 |
| 74 | F | Sergei Kostitsyn | Nashville Predators | 3 | 1 | 1 | 2 | 2 | −1 |
| 43 | D | Viktor Kostyuchenok | Avtomobilist Yekaterinburg | 7 | 0 | 0 | 0 | 2 | −5 |
| 88 | F | Evgeni Kovyrshin | Severstal Cherepovets | 7 | 2 | 2 | 4 | 0 | −2 |
| 11 | F | Alexander Kulakov | HC Dinamo Minsk | 5 | 0 | 0 | 0 | 2 | −4 |
| 19 | F | Dmitry Meleshko | HC Dinamo Minsk | 7 | 0 | 0 | 0 | 0 | −4 |
| 10 | F | Andrei Mikhalev | HC Dinamo Minsk | 4 | 0 | 0 | 0 | 2 | −1 |
| 26 | F | Andrei Stas | HC Dinamo Minsk | 7 | 0 | 0 | 0 | 12 | −4 |
| 5 | D | Nikolai Stasenko | Severstal Cherepovets | 7 | 0 | 0 | 0 | 10 | −4 |
| 16 | F | Andrei Stepanov | Amur Khabarovsk | 5 | 0 | 1 | 1 | 0 | −1 |
| 18 | F | Alexei Ugarov | Torpedo Nizhny Novgorod | 7 | 2 | 1 | 3 | 0 | −2 |

=== Goaltenders ===
| Number | Player | Club | GP | W | L | Min | GA | GAA | SA | SV% | SO |
|---|---|---|---|---|---|---|---|---|---|---|---|
| 1 | Vitali Koval | Torpedo Nizhny Novgorod | 5 | 0 | 4 | 266 | 13 | 2.93 | 163 | 0.920 | 0 |
| 31 | Andrei Mezin | HC Dinamo Minsk | 2 | 1 | 0 | 70 | 4 | 3.44 | 38 | 0.895 | 0 |
| 40 | Dmitri Milchakov | Metallurg Zhlobin | 2 | 0 | 2 | 81 | 6 | 4.43 | 38 | 0.842 | 0 |

== Canada ==
- Head coach: Brent Sutter (CAN)

=== Skaters ===
| Number | Position | Player | Club | GP | G | A | Pts | PIM | +/− |
|---|---|---|---|---|---|---|---|---|---|
| 24 | F | Jamie Benn | Dallas Stars | 8 | 3 | 2 | 5 | 4 | +4 |
| 4 | D | Jay Bouwmeester | Calgary Flames | 8 | 0 | 2 | 2 | 0 | +7 |
| 41 | F | Alexandre Burrows | Vancouver Canucks | 5 | 3 | 0 | 3 | 2 | +5 |
| 14 | F | Jordan Eberle | Edmonton Oilers | 8 | 4 | 4 | 8 | 0 | +4 |
| 15 | F | Ryan Getzlaf – C | Anaheim Ducks | 8 | 2 | 7 | 9 | 27 | +6 |
| 9 | F | Evander Kane | Winnipeg Jets | 8 | 4 | 3 | 7 | 2 | +6 |
| 2 | D | Duncan Keith | Chicago Blackhawks | 8 | 1 | 10 | 11 | 0 | +7 |
| 16 | F | Andrew Ladd | Winnipeg Jets | 8 | 1 | 4 | 5 | 2 | +7 |
| 33 | D | Marc Methot | Columbus Blue Jackets | 6 | 0 | 2 | 2 | 25 | +6 |
| 27 | D | Ryan Murray | Everett Silvertips | 6 | 0 | 0 | 0 | 0 | +1 |
| 93 | F | Ryan Nugent-Hopkins | Edmonton Oilers | 8 | 4 | 2 | 6 | 4 | +2 |
| 37 | F | Ryan O'Reilly | Colorado Avalanche | 7 | 2 | 2 | 4 | 4 | +3 |
| 10 | F | Corey Perry | Anaheim Ducks | 8 | 3 | 4 | 7 | 8 | +7 |
| 3 | D | Dion Phaneuf – A | Toronto Maple Leafs | 8 | 2 | 0 | 2 | 4 | +8 |
| 26 | F | Teddy Purcell | Tampa Bay Lightning | 8 | 1 | 1 | 2 | 0 | +1 |
| 22 | D | Kyle Quincey | Detroit Red Wings | 6 | 0 | 0 | 0 | 4 | +3 |
| 7 | D | Kris Russell | St. Louis Blues | 4 | 0 | 3 | 3 | 2 | +4 |
| 5 | D | Luke Schenn | Toronto Maple Leafs | 8 | 0 | 1 | 1 | 25 | +3 |
| 81 | F | Patrick Sharp – A | Chicago Blackhawks | 8 | 1 | 7 | 8 | 2 | +2 |
| 53 | F | Jeff Skinner | Carolina Hurricanes | 8 | 3 | 2 | 5 | 4 | +3 |
| 20 | F | John Tavares | New York Islanders | 8 | 4 | 5 | 9 | 12 | +4 |
| 44 | D | Marc-Édouard Vlasic | San Jose Sharks | 2 | 0 | 0 | 0 | 0 | 0 |

=== Goaltenders ===
| Number | Player | Club | GP | W | L | Min | GA | GAA | SA | SV% | SO |
|---|---|---|---|---|---|---|---|---|---|---|---|
| 40 | Devan Dubnyk | Edmonton Oilers | 2 | 2 | 0 | 120 | 2 | 1.00 | 45 | 0.956 | 1 |
| 31 | Matt Hackett | Minnesota Wild | 0 | – | – | – | – | – | – | – | – |
| 30 | Cam Ward | Carolina Hurricanes | 6 | 4 | 2 | 361 | 17 | 2.83 | 181 | 0.906 | 0 |

== Czech Republic ==
- Head coach: Alois Hadamczik (CZE)

=== Skaters ===
| Number | Position | Player | Club | GP | G | A | Pts | PIM | +/− |
|---|---|---|---|---|---|---|---|---|---|
| 44 | D | Miroslav Blaťák | Salavat Yulaev Ufa | 10 | 1 | 1 | 2 | 0 | −6 |
| 36 | D | Petr Čáslava | CSKA Moscow | 10 | 2 | 3 | 5 | 4 | +4 |
| 10 | F | Martin Erat | Nashville Predators | 5 | 3 | 1 | 4 | 2 | −2 |
| 67 | F | Michael Frolík | Chicago Blackhawks | 10 | 2 | 1 | 3 | 0 | 0 |
| 83 | F | Aleš Hemský | Edmonton Oilers | 10 | 5 | 3 | 8 | 8 | +3 |
| 22 | F | Lukáš Kašpar | Barys Astana | 7 | 0 | 1 | 1 | 4 | +2 |
| 42 | F | Petr Koukal | HC Pardubice | 7 | 2 | 1 | 3 | 0 | +3 |
| 25 | D | Lukáš Krajíček | HC Dinamo Minsk | 10 | 1 | 3 | 4 | 6 | +4 |
| 46 | F | David Krejčí | Boston Bruins | 10 | 3 | 4 | 7 | 4 | −4 |
| 30 | D | Jakub Krejčík | HC Slavia Praha | 6 | 0 | 0 | 0 | 0 | +2 |
| 80 | D | Zdeněk Kutlák | HC Ambrì-Piotta | 1 | 0 | 0 | 0 | 4 | 0 |
| 9 | F | Milan Michálek | Ottawa Senators | 9 | 2 | 2 | 4 | 4 | −1 |
| 6 | D | Tomáš Mojžíš | HC TPS | 9 | 0 | 0 | 0 | 8 | +4 |
| 87 | D | Jakub Nakládal | Salavat Yulaev Ufa | 10 | 0 | 4 | 4 | 6 | −1 |
| 93 | F | Petr Nedvěd – A | HC Bílí Tygři Liberec | 9 | 3 | 2 | 5 | 2 | 0 |
| 23 | D | Ondřej Němec | Severstal Cherepovets | 9 | 0 | 2 | 2 | 4 | +6 |
| 12 | F | Jiří Novotný – A | Barys Astana | 10 | 4 | 1 | 5 | 0 | +4 |
| 88 | F | Jakub Petružálek | Amur Khabarovsk | 10 | 1 | 3 | 4 | 0 | +5 |
| 14 | F | Tomáš Plekanec – C | Montreal Canadiens | 10 | 1 | 6 | 7 | 4 | −1 |
| 73 | F | Petr Průcha | SKA Saint Petersburg | 10 | 1 | 2 | 3 | 4 | +2 |
| 62 | F | Petr Tenkrát | HC Sparta Praha | 10 | 1 | 3 | 4 | 2 | +2 |
| 82 | F | Michal Vondrka | HC Slavia Praha | 9 | 0 | 1 | 1 | 0 | 0 |

=== Goaltenders ===
| Number | Player | Club | GP | W | L | Min | GA | GAA | SA | SV% | SO |
|---|---|---|---|---|---|---|---|---|---|---|---|
| 1 | Jakub Kovář | Motor České Budějovice | 6 | 3 | 2 | 351 | 12 | 2.05 | 166 | 0.928 | 1 |
| 29 | Petr Mrázek | Ottawa 67's | 1 | 0 | 0 | 9 | 0 | 0.00 | 2 | 1.000 | 0 |
| 33 | Jakub Štěpánek | SKA Saint Petersburg | 5 | 3 | 1 | 242 | 6 | 1.49 | 98 | 0.939 | 1 |

== Denmark ==
- Head coach: Per Bäckman (SWE)

=== Skaters ===
| Number | Position | Player | Club | GP | G | A | Pts | PIM | +/− |
|---|---|---|---|---|---|---|---|---|---|
| 4 | D | Mads Bødker | Leksands IF | 7 | 0 | 0 | 0 | 0 | −2 |
| 81 | F | Lars Eller | Montreal Canadiens | 7 | 3 | 2 | 5 | 14 | −2 |
| 26 | D | Michael Eskesen | Odense Bulldogs | 3 | 0 | 0 | 0 | 0 | 0 |
| 13 | F | Morten Green – C | Malmö Redhawks | 7 | 3 | 1 | 4 | 10 | −3 |
| 36 | F | Jannik Hansen | Vancouver Canucks | 6 | 0 | 2 | 2 | 29 | 0 |
| 44 | F | Nichlas Hardt | Jokerit | 7 | 2 | 2 | 4 | 0 | −6 |
| 84 | D | Philip Hersby | Odense Bulldogs | 7 | 0 | 1 | 1 | 2 | −2 |
| 33 | F | Julian Jakobsen | Södertälje SK | 7 | 0 | 0 | 0 | 12 | −4 |
| 40 | F | Jesper Jensen | Hamburg Freezers | 7 | 2 | 0 | 2 | 12 | −6 |
| 41 | D | Jesper B. Jensen | Rögle BK | 7 | 0 | 1 | 1 | 0 | −3 |
| 18 | D | Kasper Jensen | BIK Karlskoga | 7 | 0 | 0 | 0 | 0 | −3 |
| 3 | D | Philip Larsen | Dallas Stars | 7 | 0 | 2 | 2 | 2 | −6 |
| 6 | D | Stefan Lassen | Malmö Redhawks | 7 | 0 | 0 | 0 | 2 | −1 |
| 23 | F | Kim Lykkeskov | SønderjyskE Ishockey | 4 | 0 | 0 | 0 | 0 | −1 |
| 29 | F | Morten Madsen – A | Modo Hockey | 7 | 2 | 0 | 2 | 6 | 0 |
| 12 | F | Bjarke Møller | AaB Ishockey | 7 | 0 | 0 | 0 | 0 | +1 |
| 5 | D | Daniel Nielsen – A | Hamburg Freezers | 7 | 0 | 2 | 2 | 2 | −2 |
| 51 | F | Frans Nielsen – A | New York Islanders | 7 | 0 | 3 | 3 | 8 | −4 |
| 38 | F | Morten Poulsen | IK Oskarshamn | 7 | 1 | 0 | 1 | 0 | +1 |
| 14 | F | Kirill Starkov | SønderjyskE Ishockey | 7 | 0 | 1 | 1 | 0 | −2 |
| 8 | F | Frederik Storm | Herlev Eagles | 7 | 0 | 0 | 0 | 0 | +1 |

=== Goaltenders ===
| Number | Player | Club | GP | W | L | Min | GA | GAA | SA | SV% | SO |
|---|---|---|---|---|---|---|---|---|---|---|---|
| 30 | Frederik Andersen | Frölunda HC | 6 | 1 | 5 | 359 | 20 | 3.34 | 179 | 0.888 | 1 |
| 1 | Patrick Galbraith | Espoo Blues | 0 | – | – | – | – | – | – | – | – |
| 31 | Simon Nielsen | Lukko | 1 | 0 | 1 | 59 | 3 | 3.04 | 52 | 0.942 | 0 |

== Finland ==
- Head coach: Jukka Jalonen (FIN)

=== Skaters ===
| Number | Position | Player | Club | GP | G | A | Pts | PIM | +/− |
|---|---|---|---|---|---|---|---|---|---|
| 51 | F | Valtteri Filppula | Detroit Red Wings | 10 | 4 | 6 | 10 | 6 | +1 |
| 64 | F | Mikael Granlund | HIFK | 10 | 1 | 4 | 5 | 2 | −1 |
| 38 | D | Juuso Hietanen | Torpedo Nizhny Novgorod | 10 | 1 | 4 | 5 | 0 | −2 |
| 26 | F | Jarkko Immonen | Ak Bars Kazan | 10 | 3 | 2 | 5 | 0 | −3 |
| 6 | D | Topi Jaakola | Luleå HF | 10 | 0 | 0 | 0 | 2 | +1 |
| 56 | D | Joonas Järvinen | Lahti Pelicans | 10 | 0 | 3 | 3 | 4 | +1 |
| 18 | F | Jesse Joensuu | HV71 | 9 | 2 | 3 | 5 | 24 | +2 |
| 36 | F | Jussi Jokinen – A | Carolina Hurricanes | 10 | 5 | 4 | 9 | 8 | −2 |
| 39 | F | Niko Kapanen | Ak Bars Kazan | 10 | 1 | 1 | 2 | 2 | +1 |
| 19 | F | Tuomas Kiiskinen | KalPa | 5 | 0 | 2 | 2 | 0 | +2 |
| 9 | F | Mikko Koivu – C | Minnesota Wild | 10 | 3 | 8 | 11 | 4 | 0 |
| 71 | F | Leo Komarov | HC Dynamo Moscow | 10 | 1 | 0 | 1 | 4 | −1 |
| 27 | F | Petri Kontiola | Traktor Chelyabinsk | 10 | 0 | 2 | 2 | 4 | +2 |
| 5 | D | Lasse Kukkonen – A | Metallurg Magnitogorsk | 10 | 0 | 1 | 1 | 0 | −2 |
| 7 | D | Mikko Mäenpää | Amur Khabarovsk | 10 | 1 | 4 | 5 | 6 | −1 |
| 21 | D | Janne Niskala | Atlant Moscow Oblast | 10 | 3 | 1 | 4 | 10 | 0 |
| 20 | F | Janne Pesonen | HIFK | 9 | 1 | 2 | 3 | 2 | −3 |
| 40 | F | Antti Pihlström | Salavat Yulaev Ufa | 9 | 1 | 1 | 2 | 0 | 0 |
| 37 | F | Mika Pyörälä | Frölunda HC | 9 | 1 | 1 | 2 | 2 | 0 |
| 28 | D | Anssi Salmela | Avangard Omsk | 7 | 0 | 2 | 2 | 25 | 0 |
| 12 | F | Jani Tuppurainen | JYP Jyväskylä | 2 | 0 | 1 | 1 | 2 | +1 |
| 4 | D | Ossi Väänänen | Jokerit | 10 | 0 | 1 | 1 | 4 | +1 |

=== Goaltenders ===
| Number | Player | Club | GP | W | L | Min | GA | GAA | SA | SV% | SO |
|---|---|---|---|---|---|---|---|---|---|---|---|
| 32 | Kari Lehtonen | Dallas Stars | 4 | 2 | 2 | 232 | 11 | 2.85 | 104 | 0.894 | 1 |
| 30 | Karri Rämö | Avangard Omsk | 0 | – | – | – | – | – | – | – | – |
| 31 | Petri Vehanen | Ak Bars Kazan | 7 | 3 | 2 | 367 | 13 | 2.13 | 140 | 0.907 | 1 |

== France ==
- Head coach: Dave Henderson (FRA)

=== Skaters ===
| Number | Position | Player | Club | GP | G | A | Pts | PIM | +/− |
|---|---|---|---|---|---|---|---|---|---|
| 27 | D | Baptiste Amar | Brûleurs de Loups | 7 | 0 | 1 | 1 | 2 | −3 |
| 18 | D | Yohann Auvitu | JYP Jyväskylä | 6 | 2 | 2 | 4 | 0 | +3 |
| 3 | D | Vincent Bachet – A | Gothiques d'Amiens | 7 | 0 | 1 | 1 | 0 | −4 |
| 41 | F | Pierre-Édouard Bellemare – A | Skellefteå AIK | 5 | 2 | 4 | 6 | 4 | +2 |
| 26 | F | Charles Bertrand | Lukko | 7 | 0 | 1 | 1 | 2 | −4 |
| 74 | D | Nicolas Besch | KS Cracovia | 7 | 2 | 0 | 2 | 2 | +1 |
| 14 | F | Stéphane Da Costa | Binghamton Senators | 7 | 1 | 5 | 6 | 4 | −1 |
| 80 | F | Teddy Da Costa | GKS Tychy | 7 | 2 | 1 | 3 | 6 | 0 |
| 24 | F | Julien Desrosiers | Dragons de Rouen | 7 | 1 | 3 | 4 | 4 | −2 |
| 9 | F | Damien Fleury | Timrå IK | 7 | 1 | 0 | 1 | 8 | −1 |
| 71 | F | Anthony Guttig | Ducs de Dijon | 5 | 1 | 1 | 2 | 8 | −2 |
| 84 | D | Kévin Hecquefeuille | Genève-Servette HC | 7 | 3 | 1 | 4 | 4 | −6 |
| 22 | F | Brian Henderson | Ducs d'Angers | 7 | 1 | 0 | 1 | 0 | −2 |
| 19 | F | Loïc Lampérier | Dragons de Rouen | 4 | 0 | 0 | 0 | 0 | 0 |
| 4 | D | Antonin Manavian | Dragons de Rouen | 7 | 0 | 0 | 0 | 0 | −1 |
| 10 | F | Laurent Meunier – C | Straubing Tigers | 7 | 1 | 6 | 7 | 22 | −1 |
| 20 | D | Maxime Moisand | Odense Bulldogs | 5 | 0 | 0 | 0 | 0 | 0 |
| 28 | F | Damien Raux | Ducs d'Angers | 7 | 0 | 0 | 0 | 0 | −5 |
| 32 | D | Alexandre Rouleau | Brûleurs de Loups | 7 | 1 | 1 | 2 | 6 | −1 |
| 54 | F | Antoine Roussel | Chicago Wolves | 7 | 1 | 2 | 3 | 6 | −2 |
| 77 | F | Sacha Treille | HC Sparta Praha | 2 | 1 | 1 | 2 | 27 | −1 |
| 7 | F | Yorick Treille | HC Sparta Praha | 7 | 1 | 1 | 2 | 6 | 0 |

=== Goaltenders ===
| Number | Player | Club | GP | W | L | Min | GA | GAA | SA | SV% | SO |
|---|---|---|---|---|---|---|---|---|---|---|---|
| 49 | Florian Hardy | Chamonix HC | 0 | – | – | – | – | – | – | – | – |
| 39 | Cristobal Huet | HC Fribourg-Gottéron | 5 | 3 | 2 | 299 | 18 | 3.61 | 152 | 0.882 | 0 |
| 42 | Fabrice Lhenry | Dragons de Rouen | 2 | 0 | 2 | 120 | 14 | 7.00 | 74 | 0.811 | 0 |

== Germany ==
- Head coach: Jakob Kölliker (SUI)

=== Skaters ===
| Number | Position | Player | Club | GP | G | A | Pts | PIM | +/− |
|---|---|---|---|---|---|---|---|---|---|
| 82 | D | Sinan Akdag | Krefeld Pinguine | 4 | 0 | 0 | 0 | 2 | −1 |
| 29 | F | Alexander Barta – A | Malmö Redhawks | 7 | 0 | 0 | 0 | 0 | −3 |
| 12 | D | Christopher Fischer | Grizzly Adams Wolfsburg | 7 | 2 | 2 | 4 | 4 | −5 |
| 67 | F | Sebastian Furchner | Grizzly Adams Wolfsburg | 7 | 0 | 0 | 0 | 2 | −5 |
| 57 | F | Marcel Goc – C | Florida Panthers | 7 | 0 | 0 | 0 | 2 | −2 |
| 77 | D | Nikolai Goc | Adler Mannheim | 7 | 0 | 0 | 0 | 14 | −1 |
| 87 | F | Philip Gogulla | Kölner Haie | 7 | 2 | 7 | 9 | 4 | +1 |
| 39 | F | Thomas Greilinger | ERC Ingolstadt | 7 | 2 | 0 | 2 | 4 | −1 |
| 18 | F | Kai Hospelt – A | Grizzly Adams Wolfsburg | 7 | 1 | 3 | 4 | 4 | −5 |
| 19 | F | Evan Kaufmann | DEG Metro Stars | 7 | 0 | 1 | 1 | 4 | −2 |
| 17 | F | Marcus Kink | Adler Mannheim | 6 | 1 | 0 | 1 | 2 | −2 |
| 3 | D | Justin Krueger | Charlotte Checkers | 7 | 1 | 0 | 1 | 2 | −5 |
| 27 | D | Kevin Lavallée | Kölner Haie | 7 | 0 | 2 | 2 | 6 | +3 |
| 7 | D | Florian Ondruschka | Straubing Tigers | 7 | 0 | 0 | 0 | 2 | −6 |
| 86 | F | Daniel Pietta | Krefeld Pinguine | 4 | 0 | 0 | 0 | 0 | 0 |
| 24 | F | André Rankel | Eisbären Berlin | 3 | 0 | 0 | 0 | 0 | −1 |
| 37 | F | Patrick Reimer | DEG Metro Stars | 7 | 3 | 2 | 5 | 2 | 0 |
| 2 | D | Denis Reul | Adler Mannheim | 7 | 0 | 0 | 0 | 12 | 0 |
| 13 | D | Christoph Schubert | Hamburg Freezers | 7 | 1 | 2 | 3 | 2 | −4 |
| 55 | F | Felix Schütz | Kölner Haie | 4 | 0 | 1 | 1 | 0 | −1 |
| 21 | F | John Tripp | Kölner Haie | 7 | 1 | 0 | 1 | 2 | −6 |
| 47 | F | Christoph Ullmann | Adler Mannheim | 7 | 0 | 5 | 5 | 0 | +1 |

=== Goaltenders ===
| Number | Player | Club | GP | W | L | Min | GA | GAA | SA | SV% | SO |
|---|---|---|---|---|---|---|---|---|---|---|---|
| 44 | Dennis Endras | HIFK | 6 | 2 | 3 | 317 | 23 | 4.35 | 175 | 0.869 | 1 |
| 1 | Dimitrij Kotschnew | Atlant Moscow Oblast | 2 | 0 | 2 | 102 | 8 | 4.72 | 44 | 0.818 | 0 |
| 32 | Dimitri Pätzold | Hannover Scorpions | 0 | – | – | – | – | – | – | – | – |

== Italy ==
- Head coach: Rick Cornacchia (ITA)

=== Skaters ===
| Number | Position | Player | Club | GP | G | A | Pts | PIM | +/− |
|---|---|---|---|---|---|---|---|---|---|
| 71 | F | Luca Ansoldi – A | Hockey Milano Rossoblu | 7 | 2 | 0 | 2 | 2 | −3 |
| 18 | F | Anton Bernard | Bolzano-Bozen Foxes | 7 | 0 | 0 | 0 | 2 | −3 |
| 50 | D | Christian Borgatello | Bolzano-Bozen Foxes | 1 | 0 | 0 | 0 | 0 | 0 |
| 28 | F | Manuel de Toni – C | Alleghe Hockey | 7 | 0 | 0 | 0 | 2 | −4 |
| 19 | D | Matt DeMarchi | VIK Västerås HK | 7 | 2 | 0 | 2 | 14 | −7 |
| 9 | F | Derek Edwardson | Bolzano-Bozen Foxes | 7 | 0 | 0 | 0 | 2 | −4 |
| 17 | F | Alexander Egger – A | Bolzano-Bozen Foxes | 7 | 1 | 0 | 1 | 4 | −7 |
| 15 | F | Luca Felicetti | HC Valpellice | 7 | 0 | 0 | 0 | 2 | −1 |
| 11 | F | Nicola Fontanive | Alleghe Hockey | 7 | 0 | 1 | 1 | 4 | −7 |
| 26 | D | Armin Helfer | HC Pustertal Wölfe | 4 | 0 | 0 | 0 | 0 | −1 |
| 5 | D | Roland Hofer | Peliitat Heinola | 3 | 0 | 0 | 0 | 0 | −1 |
| 41 | F | Patrick Iannone | SG Pontebba | 7 | 0 | 0 | 0 | 4 | −6 |
| 8 | F | Marco Insam | Bolzano-Bozen Foxes | 7 | 0 | 0 | 0 | 0 | −4 |
| 4 | F | Diego Iori | HC Fassa | 7 | 0 | 0 | 0 | 4 | −4 |
| 24 | D | Trevor Johnson | HC Valpellice | 7 | 0 | 0 | 0 | 4 | −7 |
| 27 | D | Thomas Larkin | Colgate University | 7 | 0 | 1 | 1 | 4 | −4 |
| 23 | D | Stefano Marchetti | HC Asiago | 7 | 0 | 0 | 0 | 0 | 0 |
| 44 | D | Nick Plastino | BIK Karlskoga | 7 | 0 | 1 | 1 | 4 | −7 |
| 88 | F | Vince Rocco | Alleghe Hockey | 7 | 0 | 1 | 1 | 4 | −5 |
| 10 | F | Giulio Scandella | HC Pustertal Wölfe | 7 | 1 | 2 | 3 | 10 | +1 |
| 93 | F | Rob Sirianni | HC Valpellice | 7 | 0 | 0 | 0 | 8 | −6 |
| 16 | F | Dan Tudin | Ritten Sport | 6 | 0 | 1 | 2 | 2 | −1 |

=== Goaltenders ===
| Number | Player | Club | GP | W | L | Min | GA | GAA | SA | SV% | SO |
|---|---|---|---|---|---|---|---|---|---|---|---|
| 30 | Daniel Bellissimo | BIK Karlskoga | 5 | 1 | 4 | 274 | 20 | 4.37 | 184 | 0.891 | 0 |
| 35 | Andreas Bernard | SaiPa | 0 | – | – | – | – | – | – | – | – |
| 34 | Thomas Tragust | WSV Sterzing Broncos | 4 | 0 | 2 | 146 | 11 | 4.51 | 94 | 0.883 | 0 |

== Kazakhstan ==
- Head coach: Andrei Shayanov (RUS)

=== Skaters ===
| Number | Position | Player | Club | GP | G | A | Pts | PIM | +/− |
|---|---|---|---|---|---|---|---|---|---|
| 27 | F | Evgeni Bumagin | Barys Astana | 7 | 0 | 0 | 0 | 6 | −7 |
| 21 | F | Dmitri Dudarev | Kazzinc-Torpedo | 5 | 0 | 3 | 3 | 0 | 0 |
| 37 | D | Evgeni Fadeyev | Barys Astana | 7 | 0 | 0 | 0 | 4 | −6 |
| 70 | D | Vladislav Kolesnikov | Kazzinc-Torpedo | 7 | 0 | 0 | 0 | 4 | −7 |
| 5 | D | Andrei Korabeinikov | Kazzinc-Torpedo | 4 | 0 | 0 | 0 | 2 | −5 |
| 62 | F | Vadim Krasnoslobodtsev | Barys Astana | 7 | 3 | 0 | 3 | 0 | −1 |
| 7 | D | Alexei Litvinenko | Barys Astana | 6 | 0 | 0 | 0 | 8 | −3 |
| 4 | D | Vitali Novopashin – A | Barys Astana | 7 | 0 | 4 | 4 | 2 | 0 |
| 18 | F | Fyodor Polishchuk | Barys Astana | 7 | 1 | 0 | 1 | 4 | −4 |
| 81 | F | Konstantin Pushkaryov | Barys Astana | 7 | 3 | 1 | 4 | 2 | −1 |
| 85 | F | Konstantin Romanov | Barys Astana | 7 | 0 | 0 | 0 | 4 | −6 |
| 88 | F | Evgeni Rymarev | Barys Astana | 7 | 1 | 0 | 1 | 2 | −3 |
| 2 | D | Roman Savchenko | Barys Astana | 7 | 1 | 1 | 2 | 14 | −6 |
| 26 | F | Konstantin Savenkov | Kazzinc-Torpedo | 3 | 0 | 0 | 0 | 2 | 0 |
| 12 | D | Denis Shemelin | Kazzinc-Torpedo | 5 | 0 | 1 | 1 | 8 | +3 |
| 23 | F | Andrei Spiridonov | HC Astana | 7 | 0 | 0 | 0 | 2 | −3 |
| 48 | F | Roman Starchenko | Barys Astana | 2 | 0 | 2 | 2 | 0 | −1 |
| 55 | D | Alexei Troschinsky | HC Vityaz | 7 | 0 | 1 | 1 | 0 | −5 |
| 36 | F | Dmitri Upper – C | Atlant Moscow Oblast | 7 | 0 | 3 | 3 | 0 | −3 |
| 54 | F | Alexei Vorontsov | HC Astana | 6 | 0 | 0 | 0 | 0 | −4 |
| 75 | D | Sergei Yakovenko | Saryarka Karagandy | 7 | 0 | 0 | 0 | 6 | −6 |
| 8 | F | Talgat Zhailauov – A | Barys Astana | 7 | 2 | 2 | 4 | 2 | −3 |

=== Goaltenders ===
| Number | Player | Club | GP | W | L | Min | GA | GAA | SA | SV% | SO |
|---|---|---|---|---|---|---|---|---|---|---|---|
| 1 | Alexei Ivanov | Barys Astana | 2 | 0 | 0 | 35 | 3 | 5.16 | 27 | 0.889 | 0 |
| 20 | Vitali Kolesnik | Salavat Yulaev Ufa | 4 | 0 | 4 | 208 | 18 | 5.18 | 172 | 0.895 | 0 |
| 31 | Vitali Yeremeyev | Barys Astana | 4 | 0 | 3 | 180 | 12 | 4.00 | 111 | 0.892 | 0 |

== Latvia ==
- Head coach: Ted Nolan (CAN)

=== Skaters ===
| Number | Position | Player | Club | GP | G | A | Pts | PIM | +/− |
|---|---|---|---|---|---|---|---|---|---|
| 3 | D | Jānis Andersons | HK Liepājas Metalurgs | 4 | 0 | 0 | 0 | 0 | 0 |
| 8 | D | Oskars Bārtulis | Adirondack Phantoms | 6 | 1 | 2 | 3 | 2 | 0 |
| 21 | F | Armands Bērziņš | Yunost Minsk | 6 | 1 | 1 | 2 | 14 | 0 |
| 9 | F | Roberts Bukarts | Dinamo Riga | 3 | 0 | 0 | 0 | 0 | 0 |
| 44 | D | Oskars Cibuļskis | Dinamo Riga | 7 | 0 | 0 | 0 | 4 | −2 |
| 47 | F | Mārtiņš Cipulis | Dinamo Riga | 7 | 0 | 1 | 1 | 0 | −1 |
| 16 | F | Kaspars Daugaviņš | Ottawa Senators | 7 | 1 | 1 | 2 | 8 | −2 |
| 12 | F | Andris Džeriņš | Dinamo Riga | 4 | 0 | 0 | 0 | 4 | 0 |
| 13 | D | Guntis Galviņš | Dinamo Riga | 7 | 0 | 3 | 3 | 2 | +3 |
| 70 | F | Miks Indrašis | HK Rīga | 7 | 3 | 2 | 5 | 2 | +1 |
| 90 | F | Koba Jass | Kazzinc-Torpedo | 7 | 0 | 0 | 0 | 27 | −1 |
| 15 | F | Ronalds Ķēniņš | ZSC Lions | 5 | 1 | 2 | 3 | 6 | +1 |
| 2 | D | Rodrigo Laviņš | Dinamo Riga | 7 | 0 | 0 | 0 | 0 | −5 |
| 87 | F | Gints Meija | Dinamo Riga | 7 | 1 | 0 | 1 | 0 | 0 |
| 81 | D | Georgijs Pujacs – A | Avangard Omsk | 7 | 0 | 1 | 1 | 2 | −2 |
| 26 | D | Krišjānis Rēdlihs – A | Dinamo Riga | 7 | 1 | 0 | 1 | 0 | −3 |
| 24 | F | Miķelis Rēdlihs | Dinamo Riga | 7 | 1 | 0 | 1 | 4 | −3 |
| 18 | F | Kaspars Saulietis | HK Neman Grodno | 7 | 0 | 0 | 0 | 6 | −4 |
| 17 | F | Aleksejs Širokovs | Kazzinc-Torpedo | 7 | 1 | 0 | 1 | 2 | −4 |
| 11 | D | Kristaps Sotnieks | Dinamo Riga | 7 | 0 | 0 | 0 | 0 | −3 |
| 5 | F | Jānis Sprukts – C | Dinamo Riga | 7 | 0 | 4 | 4 | 2 | +1 |
| 60 | F | Juris Štāls | Dinamo Riga | 7 | 0 | 0 | 0 | 0 | −4 |

=== Goaltenders ===
| Number | Player | Club | GP | W | L | Min | GA | GAA | SA | SV% | SO |
|---|---|---|---|---|---|---|---|---|---|---|---|
| 1 | Māris Jučers | Dinamo Riga | 2 | 0 | 1 | 78 | 4 | 3.07 | 49 | 0.918 | 0 |
| 31 | Edgars Masaļskis | HC Ugra | 6 | 2 | 4 | 340 | 15 | 2.65 | 187 | 0.920 | 1 |
| 30 | Ervīns Muštukovs | Odense Bulldogs | 0 | – | – | – | – | – | – | – | – |

== Norway ==
- Head coach: Roy Johansen (NOR)

=== Skaters ===
| Number | Position | Player | Club | GP | G | A | Pts | PIM | +/− |
|---|---|---|---|---|---|---|---|---|---|
| 21 | F | Morten Ask | HV71 | 8 | 2 | 8 | 10 | 6 | +4 |
| 20 | F | Anders Bastiansen – A | Färjestad BK | 8 | 1 | 4 | 5 | 8 | +2 |
| 47 | D | Alexander Bonsaksen | Rögle BK | 8 | 0 | 1 | 1 | 0 | +5 |
| 26 | F | Kristian Forsberg | Modo Hockey | 6 | 0 | 0 | 0 | 2 | −2 |
| 8 | F | Mads Hansen | Brynäs IF | 8 | 2 | 7 | 9 | 4 | +6 |
| 6 | D | Jonas Holøs | Växjö Lakers | 8 | 4 | 5 | 9 | 2 | +4 |
| 9 | F | Marius Holtet | Färjestad BK | 7 | 2 | 3 | 5 | 4 | −1 |
| 5 | D | Juha Kaunismäki | Stavanger Oilers | 8 | 1 | 1 | 2 | 2 | 0 |
| 15 | F | Tommy Kristiansen | HV71 | 6 | 0 | 0 | 0 | 2 | −1 |
| 24 | F | Andreas Martinsen | Lillehammer IK | 8 | 1 | 2 | 3 | 0 | −1 |
| 40 | F | Ken André Olimb | Leksands IF | 8 | 0 | 2 | 2 | 0 | +1 |
| 46 | F | Mathis Olimb | Frölunda HC | 8 | 1 | 6 | 7 | 16 | +1 |
| 51 | F | Mats Rosseli Olsen | Frölunda HC | 5 | 0 | 0 | 0 | 0 | −1 |
| 37 | D | Lars Løkken Østli | Storhamar Dragons | 8 | 0 | 0 | 0 | 0 | −1 |
| 22 | F | Martin Røymark | Timrå IK | 8 | 1 | 0 | 1 | 8 | −2 |
| 19 | F | Per-Åge Skrøder | Modo Hockey | 8 | 5 | 7 | 12 | 2 | +7 |
| 39 | D | Henrik Solberg | Stavanger Oilers | 8 | 0 | 1 | 1 | 4 | −3 |
| 10 | F | Lars Erik Spets | Lørenskog IK | 8 | 3 | 1 | 4 | 4 | +1 |
| 41 | F | Patrick Thoresen – A | SKA Saint Petersburg | 8 | 7 | 11 | 18 | 4 | +6 |
| 55 | D | Ole-Kristian Tollefsen – C | Modo Hockey | 8 | 0 | 0 | 0 | 20 | +3 |
| 23 | D | Mats Trygg | HV71 | 8 | 5 | 1 | 6 | 14 | +6 |

=== Goaltenders ===
| Number | Player | Club | GP | W | L | Min | GA | GAA | SA | SV% | SO |
|---|---|---|---|---|---|---|---|---|---|---|---|
| 33 | Pål Grotnes | Stjernen Hockey | 0 | – | – | – | – | – | – | – | – |
| 30 | Lars Haugen | HC Shakhtyor Soligorsk | 7 | 4 | 3 | 425 | 20 | 2.82 | 220 | 0.909 | 1 |
| 34 | Lars Volden | Espoo Blues | 1 | 0 | 1 | 60 | 4 | 4.00 | 46 | 0.913 | 0 |

== Russia ==
- Head coach: Zinetula Bilyaletdinov (RUS)

=== Skaters ===
| Number | Position | Player | Club | GP | G | A | Pts | PIM | +/− |
|---|---|---|---|---|---|---|---|---|---|
| 48 | D | Evgeny Biryukov | Metallurg Magnitogorsk | 7 | 1 | 3 | 4 | 4 | +9 |
| 13 | F | Pavel Datsyuk | Detroit Red Wings | 10 | 3 | 4 | 7 | 2 | +7 |
| 6 | D | Denis Denisov | SKA Saint Petersburg | 10 | 2 | 1 | 3 | 2 | +5 |
| 74 | D | Alexei Emelin | Montreal Canadiens | 9 | 2 | 2 | 4 | 4 | +12 |
| 7 | D | Dmitri Kalinin – A | SKA Saint Petersburg | 5 | 1 | 3 | 4 | 25 | +6 |
| 80 | F | Evgeny Ketov | Severstal Cherepovets | 7 | 0 | 0 | 0 | 0 | 0 |
| 19 | F | Denis Kokarev | HC Dynamo Moscow | 10 | 1 | 0 | 1 | 4 | 0 |
| 41 | F | Nikolai Kulemin | Toronto Maple Leafs | 10 | 1 | 3 | 4 | 0 | +4 |
| 92 | F | Evgeny Kuznetsov | Traktor Chelyabinsk | 10 | 2 | 4 | 6 | 4 | +3 |
| 11 | F | Evgeni Malkin | Pittsburgh Penguins | 10 | 11 | 8 | 19 | 4 | +16 |
| 82 | D | Yevgeny Medvedev | Ak Bars Kazan | 10 | 1 | 3 | 4 | 4 | +4 |
| 12 | D | Nikita Nikitin | Columbus Blue Jackets | 10 | 0 | 4 | 4 | 4 | +4 |
| 5 | D | Ilya Nikulin – C | Ak Bars Kazan | 10 | 2 | 5 | 7 | 8 | +10 |
| 8 | F | Alexander Ovechkin | Washington Capitals | 3 | 2 | 2 | 4 | 2 | +5 |
| 37 | F | Alexander Perezhogin | Avangard Omsk | 10 | 4 | 5 | 9 | 4 | +16 |
| 24 | F | Alexander Popov | Avangard Omsk | 10 | 4 | 8 | 12 | 2 | +15 |
| 77 | D | Evgeny Ryasensky | HC CSKA Moscow | 7 | 0 | 1 | 1 | 0 | +3 |
| 28 | F | Alexander Semin | Washington Capitals | 3 | 2 | 3 | 5 | 0 | +4 |
| 52 | F | Sergei Shirokov | HC CSKA Moscow | 10 | 1 | 5 | 6 | 2 | +2 |
| 15 | F | Alexander Svitov | Salavat Yulaev Ufa | 10 | 0 | 0 | 0 | 4 | 0 |
| 27 | F | Alexei Tereshchenko – A | Ak Bars Kazan | 10 | 2 | 1 | 3 | 2 | +2 |
| 93 | F | Nikolay Zherdev | Atlant Moscow Oblast | 10 | 2 | 4 | 6 | 2 | +3 |

=== Goaltenders ===
| Number | Player | Club | GP | W | L | Min | GA | GAA | SA | SV% | SO |
|---|---|---|---|---|---|---|---|---|---|---|---|
| 30 | Konstantin Barulin | Atlant Moscow Oblast | 2 | 2 | 0 | 120 | 1 | 0.50 | 66 | 0.985 | 1 |
| 40 | Mikhail Biryukov | HC Ugra | 1 | 0 | 0 | 40 | 0 | 0.00 | 21 | 1.000 | 0 |
| 1 | Semyon Varlamov | Colorado Avalanche | 8 | 8 | 0 | 440 | 13 | 1.77 | 214 | 0.939 | 1 |

== Slovakia ==
- Head coach: Vladimír Vůjtek (CZE)

=== Skaters ===
| Number | Position | Player | Club | GP | G | A | Pts | PIM | +/− |
|---|---|---|---|---|---|---|---|---|---|
| 7 | D | Ivan Baranka | HC Spartak Moscow | 10 | 0 | 3 | 3 | 2 | +5 |
| 61 | F | Milan Bartovič | HC Bílí Tygři Liberec | 10 | 3 | 0 | 3 | 6 | −3 |
| 55 | F | Mário Bližňák | HC Sparta Praha | 10 | 0 | 3 | 3 | 2 | −2 |
| 33 | D | Zdeno Chára – C | Boston Bruins | 10 | 2 | 2 | 4 | 4 | +4 |
| 51 | D | Dominik Graňák – A | HC Dynamo Moscow | 6 | 2 | 1 | 3 | 6 | 0 |
| 26 | F | Michal Handzuš – A | San Jose Sharks | 8 | 2 | 5 | 7 | 0 | +3 |
| 87 | F | Marcel Haščák | HC Košice | 10 | 0 | 1 | 1 | 2 | −1 |
| 81 | F | Marcel Hossa | Dinamo Riga | 6 | 0 | 0 | 0 | 0 | 0 |
| 25 | F | Marek Hovorka | HC Kladno | 4 | 0 | 0 | 0 | 2 | −2 |
| 21 | F | Libor Hudáček | HC Slovan Bratislava | 10 | 2 | 3 | 5 | 0 | 0 |
| 82 | F | Tomáš Kopecký | Florida Panthers | 10 | 5 | 1 | 6 | 4 | +6 |
| 78 | D | Kristián Kudroč | HC Sibir Novosibirsk | 1 | 0 | 0 | 0 | 0 | −1 |
| 91 | F | Michel Miklík | HC Košice | 10 | 1 | 1 | 2 | 0 | +1 |
| 71 | F | Juraj Mikúš | HC Lev Poprad | 10 | 1 | 3 | 4 | 4 | +2 |
| 92 | F | Branko Radivojevič | Atlant Moscow Oblast | 10 | 4 | 4 | 8 | 2 | +5 |
| 18 | F | Miroslav Šatan – A | HC Slovan Bratislava | 10 | 4 | 2 | 6 | 4 | 0 |
| 44 | D | Andrej Sekera | Buffalo Sabres | 10 | 2 | 7 | 9 | 6 | +4 |
| 4 | D | Michal Sersen | HC Sparta Praha | 10 | 0 | 0 | 0 | 4 | +1 |
| 19 | D | Tomáš Starosta | HC Ugra | 10 | 0 | 0 | 0 | 2 | -1 |
| 43 | F | Tomáš Surový | CSKA Moscow | 10 | 0 | 4 | 4 | 12 | +1 |
| 90 | F | Tomáš Tatar | Grand Rapids Griffins | 10 | 2 | 3 | 5 | 0 | +1 |
| 23 | D | René Vydarený | Motor České Budějovice | 10 | 0 | 0 | 0 | 2 | -2 |

=== Goaltenders ===
| Number | Player | Club | GP | W | L | Min | GA | GAA | SA | SV% | SO |
|---|---|---|---|---|---|---|---|---|---|---|---|
| 2 | Peter Hamerlík | HC Oceláři Třinec | 2 | 0 | 1 | 74 | 4 | 3.23 | 39 | 0.897 | 0 |
| 39 | Július Hudáček | Södertälje SK | 0 | – | – | – | – | – | – | – | – |
| 50 | Ján Laco | HC Lev Poprad | 9 | 7 | 2 | 524 | 19 | 2.17 | 250 | 0.924 | 1 |

== Sweden ==
- Head coach: Pär Mårts (SWE)

=== Skaters ===
| Number | Position | Player | Club | GP | G | A | Pts | PIM | +/− |
|---|---|---|---|---|---|---|---|---|---|
| 11 | F | Daniel Alfredsson – C | Ottawa Senators | 8 | 1 | 6 | 7 | 2 | 0 |
| 19 | F | Nicklas Bäckström | Washington Capitals | 2 | 0 | 1 | 1 | 0 | −2 |
| 28 | D | Jonas Brodin | Färjestad BK | 7 | 1 | 0 | 1 | 0 | +1 |
| 52 | D | Jonathan Ericsson | Detroit Red Wings | 2 | 1 | 0 | 1 | 2 | +1 |
| 21 | F | Loui Eriksson | Dallas Stars | 8 | 5 | 8 | 13 | 2 | +7 |
| 93 | F | Johan Franzén | Detroit Red Wings | 7 | 4 | 5 | 9 | 8 | +3 |
| 77 | D | Victor Hedman | Tampa Bay Lightning | 8 | 0 | 1 | 1 | 14 | −1 |
| 44 | D | Niklas Hjalmarsson | Chicago Blackhawks | 8 | 0 | 3 | 3 | 2 | 0 |
| 27 | F | Patric Hörnqvist | Nashville Predators | 3 | 0 | 0 | 0 | 4 | 0 |
| 16 | F | Calle Järnkrok | Brynäs IF | 8 | 0 | 1 | 1 | 0 | 0 |
| 65 | D | Erik Karlsson | Ottawa Senators | 8 | 3 | 4 | 7 | 2 | +3 |
| 7 | D | Niklas Kronwall | Detroit Red Wings | 8 | 1 | 0 | 1 | 4 | +1 |
| 4 | D | Staffan Kronwall | Severstal Cherepovets | 8 | 1 | 1 | 2 | 2 | +5 |
| 32 | F | Marcus Krüger | Chicago Blackhawks | 8 | 3 | 2 | 5 | 6 | +3 |
| 92 | F | Gabriel Landeskog – A | Colorado Avalanche | 8 | 1 | 4 | 5 | 6 | +3 |
| 10 | F | Johan Larsson | Brynäs IF | 7 | 0 | 2 | 2 | 0 | −2 |
| 20 | F | Joel Lundqvist | Frölunda HC | 3 | 1 | 1 | 2 | 2 | +1 |
| 23 | F | Niklas Persson | HC CSKA Moscow | 8 | 2 | 1 | 3 | 2 | −2 |
| 12 | F | Fredrik Pettersson | Frölunda HC | 1 | 0 | 0 | 0 | 0 | 0 |
| 33 | F | Jakob Silfverberg | Ottawa Senators | 8 | 2 | 0 | 2 | 2 | −1 |
| 25 | F | Viktor Stålberg | Chicago Blackhawks | 8 | 3 | 1 | 4 | 2 | +4 |
| 40 | F | Henrik Zetterberg – A | Detroit Red Wings | 8 | 3 | 12 | 15 | 4 | +6 |

=== Goaltenders ===
| Number | Player | Club | GP | W | L | Min | GA | GAA | SA | SV% | SO |
|---|---|---|---|---|---|---|---|---|---|---|---|
| 1 | Jhonas Enroth | Buffalo Sabres | 2 | 2 | 0 | 120 | 5 | 2.50 | 38 | 0.868 | 0 |
| 30 | Viktor Fasth | AIK IF | 6 | 4 | 2 | 360 | 14 | 2.34 | 143 | 0.902 | 2 |
| 41 | Cristopher Nilstorp | Färjestad BK | 0 | – | – | – | – | – | – | – | – |

== Switzerland ==
- Head coach: Sean Simpson (CAN)

=== Skaters ===
| Number | Position | Player | Club | GP | G | A | Pts | PIM | +/− |
|---|---|---|---|---|---|---|---|---|---|
| 10 | F | Andres Ambühl | ZSC Lions | 7 | 1 | 0 | 1 | 2 | −4 |
| 57 | D | Goran Bezina – A | Genève-Servette HC | 5 | 1 | 1 | 2 | 29 | +1 |
| 48 | F | Matthias Bieber | Kloten Flyers | 7 | 0 | 1 | 1 | 4 | −1 |
| 5 | D | Severin Blindenbacher | ZSC Lions | 7 | 0 | 3 | 3 | 2 | −1 |
| 96 | F | Damien Brunner | EV Zug | 7 | 3 | 4 | 7 | 6 | +2 |
| 13 | D | Félicien Du Bois | Kloten Flyers | 7 | 1 | 1 | 2 | 2 | 0 |
| 54 | D | Philippe Furrer | SC Bern | 7 | 0 | 1 | 1 | 0 | 0 |
| 70 | F | Denis Hollenstein | Kloten Flyers | 7 | 0 | 2 | 2 | 2 | +1 |
| 90 | D | Roman Josi | Nashville Predators | 3 | 0 | 1 | 1 | 0 | 0 |
| 25 | F | Thibaut Monnet | ZSC Lions | 5 | 0 | 0 | 0 | 0 | −2 |
| 82 | F | Simon Moser | SCL Tigers | 2 | 2 | 0 | 2 | 0 | +2 |
| 22 | F | Nino Niederreiter | New York Islanders | 6 | 0 | 0 | 0 | 2 | −5 |
| 11 | F | Benjamin Plüss | HC Fribourg-Gottéron | 7 | 0 | 1 | 1 | 2 | −2 |
| 88 | F | Kevin Romy | HC Lugano | 7 | 1 | 5 | 6 | 2 | +1 |
| 40 | F | Daniel Rubin | Genève-Servette HC | 4 | 0 | 0 | 0 | 4 | 0 |
| 32 | F | Ivo Rüthemann – A | SC Bern | 7 | 3 | 1 | 4 | 2 | +1 |
| 47 | D | Luca Sbisa | Anaheim Ducks | 7 | 0 | 1 | 1 | 8 | −6 |
| 31 | D | Mathias Seger – A | ZSC Lions | 7 | 0 | 0 | 0 | 0 | +1 |
| 7 | D | Mark Streit – C | New York Islanders | 7 | 2 | 2 | 4 | 6 | −5 |
| 43 | F | Morris Trachsler | Genève-Servette HC | 7 | 1 | 0 | 1 | 2 | 0 |
| 72 | D | Patrick von Gunten | Frölunda HC | 7 | 0 | 0 | 0 | 0 | 0 |
| 14 | F | Roman Wick | Kloten Flyers | 7 | 1 | 1 | 2 | 0 | −3 |

=== Goaltenders ===
| Number | Player | Club | GP | W | L | Min | GA | GAA | SA | SV% | SO |
|---|---|---|---|---|---|---|---|---|---|---|---|
| 20 | Reto Berra | EHC Biel | 4 | 1 | 3 | 239 | 12 | 3.01 | 100 | 0.880 | 0 |
| 30 | Lukas Flüeler | ZSC Lions | 0 | – | – | – | – | – | – | – | – |
| 52 | Tobias Stephan | Genève-Servette HC | 3 | 1 | 2 | 177 | 9 | 3.06 | 78 | 0.885 | 0 |

== United States ==
- Head coach: Scott Gordon (USA)

=== Skaters ===
| Number | Position | Player | Club | GP | G | A | Pts | PIM | +/− |
|---|---|---|---|---|---|---|---|---|---|
| 18 | F | Justin Abdelkader | Detroit Red Wings | 8 | 1 | 3 | 4 | 4 | +4 |
| 13 | F | Cam Atkinson | Columbus Blue Jackets | 8 | 1 | 2 | 3 | 4 | +3 |
| 20 | D | Justin Braun | San Jose Sharks | 8 | 0 | 0 | 0 | 2 | −4 |
| 23 | F | J. T. Brown | Tampa Bay Lightning | 6 | 1 | 1 | 2 | 0 | +4 |
| 34 | D | Chris Butler | Calgary Flames | 8 | 1 | 1 | 2 | 0 | +1 |
| 15 | F | Joey Crabb | Toronto Maple Leafs | 8 | 0 | 3 | 3 | 4 | +2 |
| 39 | F | Patrick Dwyer | Carolina Hurricanes | 8 | 1 | 2 | 3 | 0 | 0 |
| 27 | D | Justin Faulk | Carolina Hurricanes | 8 | 4 | 4 | 8 | 2 | +9 |
| 4 | D | Cam Fowler | Anaheim Ducks | 8 | 1 | 4 | 5 | 2 | +5 |
| 7 | D | Alex Goligoski | Dallas Stars | 8 | 1 | 4 | 5 | 2 | +7 |
| 3 | D | Jack Johnson – C | Columbus Blue Jackets | 8 | 3 | 1 | 4 | 16 | 0 |
| 11 | F | Ryan Lasch | Lahti Pelicans | 7 | 0 | 2 | 2 | 0 | −1 |
| 21 | F | Kyle Okposo | New York Islanders | 8 | 2 | 1 | 3 | 0 | +2 |
| 67 | F | Max Pacioretty | Montreal Canadiens | 8 | 2 | 10 | 12 | 4 | +5 |
| 61 | F | Kyle Palmieri | Anaheim Ducks | 7 | 2 | 2 | 4 | 8 | +2 |
| 2 | D | Jeff Petry | Edmonton Oilers | 8 | 2 | 3 | 5 | 4 | +4 |
| 9 | F | Bobby Ryan | Anaheim Ducks | 8 | 5 | 2 | 7 | 0 | +4 |
| 19 | F | Jim Slater – A | Winnipeg Jets | 8 | 2 | 1 | 3 | 6 | −2 |
| 25 | F | Craig Smith | Nashville Predators | 4 | 0 | 2 | 2 | 2 | +1 |
| 26 | F | Paul Stastny | Colorado Avalanche | 8 | 3 | 6 | 9 | 0 | +6 |
| 44 | F | Nate Thompson – A | Tampa Bay Lightning | 8 | 2 | 0 | 2 | 0 | 0 |

=== Goaltenders ===
| Number | Player | Club | GP | W | L | Min | GA | GAA | SA | SV% | SO |
|---|---|---|---|---|---|---|---|---|---|---|---|
| 31 | Richard Bachman | Dallas Stars | 1 | 1 | 0 | 65 | 2 | 1.86 | 19 | 0.895 | 0 |
| 36 | John Curry | Hamburg Freezers | 0 | – | – | – | – | – | – | – | – |
| 35 | Jimmy Howard | Detroit Red Wings | 7 | 5 | 2 | 421 | 17 | 2.42 | 190 | 0.911 | 1 |
