= Novopolotsk =

Novopolotsk Наваполацк (Belarusian) Новополоцк (Russian) Navapolatsk
- City
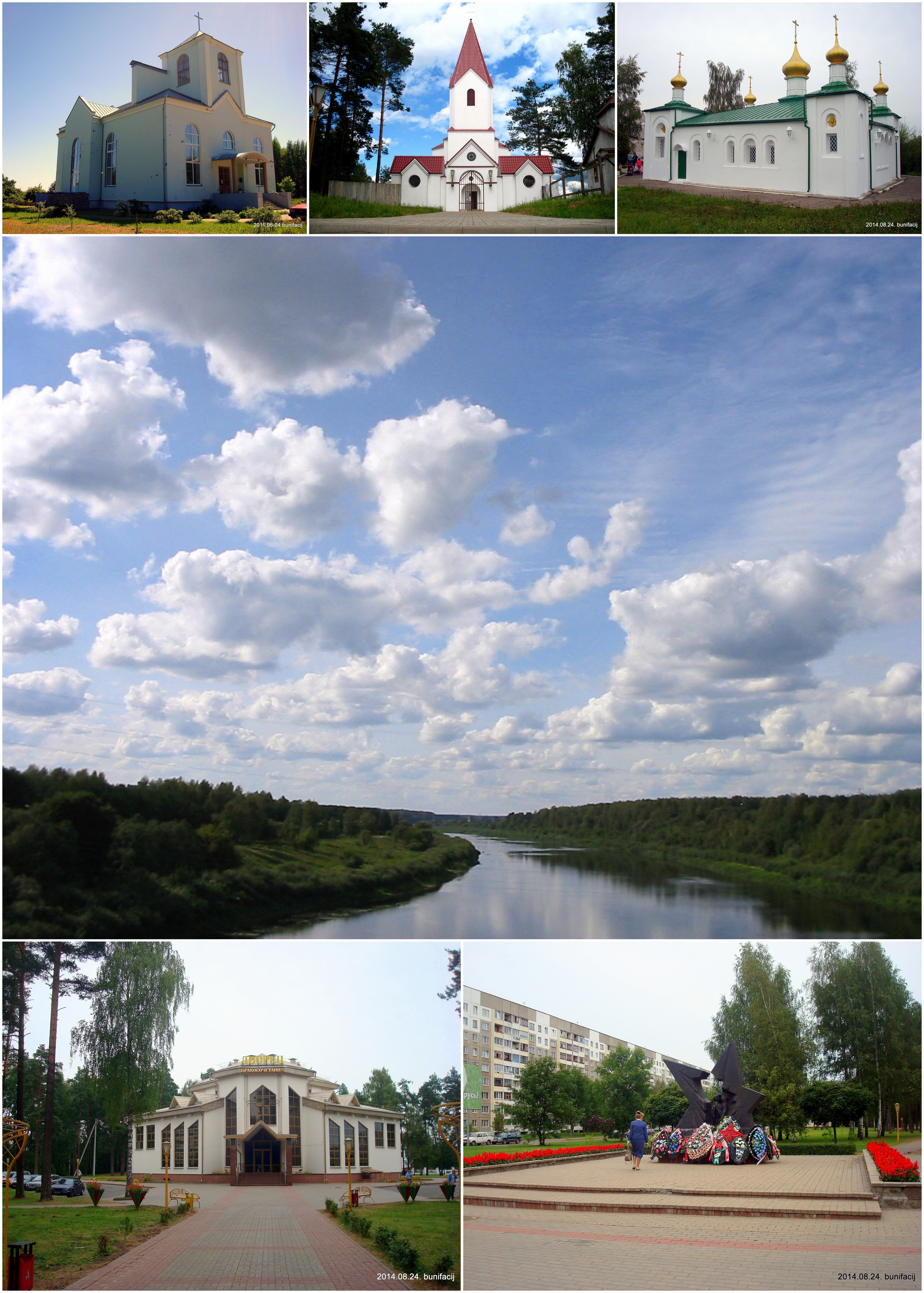

- Flag Coat of arms

- Location within Belarus
- Coordinates: 55°32′N 28°39′E
- Country: Belarus
- Region: Vitebsk Region
- Founded: 1958

Area
  - City: 48.49 km^{2} (18.72 sq mi)
- Elevation: 133 m (436 ft)

Population (2025)
  - Urban: 95,370
- Time zone: UTC+3 (MSK)
- Postal code: 211440
- Area code: +375 213
- Vehicle registration: 2
- Website: novopolotsk.by

Novopolotsk or Navapolatsk (Russian: Новополоцк, IPA: [nəvɐˈpolətsk]; Belarusian: Наваполацк, romanized: Navapolack, IPA: [navaˈpɔlat͡sk]) is a city in Vitebsk Oblast, Belarus. Founded in 1958, it is located close to the city of Polotsk and the name literally means "New Polotsk". In 2008, its population was 107,458. As of 2025, it has a population of 95,370.

== Industry ==
Novopolotsk and the surrounding area generally relies on the petrochemical industry.

=== OJSC "Naftan" ===
Naftan is the leading oil refinery. It was constructed in 1959. This refinery takes crude oil from the Volga Region of Russia and generates diesel, gasoline, and kerosine, along with other technological products. In addition to Naftan, Belarus built a large chemical plant, called "Polymir". This plant produces plastic and polyethylene. There are multiple products that could be produced from polyethylene, for example artificial fur.

== Tourism ==
Novopolotsk is not very big in the tourism business. However, there are six hotels in the city available for tourists.

== Sport ==
Novopolotsk has produced several players for Belarus national bandy team. Daniil Garnitsky is President of the Belarusian Bandy Federation. Khimik-SKA Novopolotsk of the Belarusian Extraleague is the local pro hockey team.

== Culture ==
There are several culture centres, music schools, of which the Novopolotsk State Musical College, art schools, and libraries in the city. There is also a museum of history and culture of Novopolotsk. The city has an a cappella music group, which won an international award.

== International relations ==
Novopolotsk is twinned with:

- Chauffailles, France
- Dmitrovsky (Moscow), Russia
- Elektrostal, Russia
- Givors, France
- Kruševac, Serbia
- Kstovo, Russia
- Kursk, Russia
- Ludza, Latvia
- Mažeikiai, Lithuania
- Odintsovo, Russia
- Orekhovo-Zuyevo, Russia
- Ostrowiec Świętokrzyski, Poland
- Pantelej (Niš), Serbia
- Pavlovsk, Russia
- Pushkin, Russia
- Skadovsk, Ukraine
- Smiltene, Latvia
- Ventspils, Latvia

Former twin towns:

- Płock, Poland

In March 2022, the Polish city of Płock suspended its partnership with Novopolotsk as a response to Belarusian involvement in the 2022 Russian invasion of Ukraine.

== Notable people ==
People from Novopolotsk:

- Mikalai Aliokhin (born 1998), handballer
- Elvin Mohhubat oglu Aliyev (born 2000), footballer
- Igor Astapkovich (born 1963), hammer thrower
- Dzmitry Barysaw (born 1995), footballer
- Viktor Belyatsky (born 1970), weightlifter
- Darya Blashko (born 1996), biathlete
- Viachaslau Bokhan (born 1996), handballer
- Igor Brikun (born 1986), ice hockey goaltender
- Pavel Chernook (born 1986), ice hockey player
- Pavel Chernov (born 1990), ice hockey player
- Vadim Devyatovskiy (born 1977), hammer thrower
- Aleksandr Frantsev (born 1997), footballer
- Lyudmila Gubkina (born 1973), hammer thrower
- Danila Karaban (born 1996), ice hockey player
- Uladzislaw Kasmynin (born 1990), footballer
- Vitali Kiryushchenkov (born 1992), ice hockey forward
- Alexander Kitarov (born 1987), ice hockey player
- Sergei Kolosov (born 1986), ice hockey defenceman
- Nikita Komarov (born 1988), ice hockey player
- Dmitry Korobov (born 1989), ice hockey defenceman
- Andrei Kostitsyn (born 1985), ice hockey forward
- Sergei Kostitsyn (born 1987), ice hockey forward; brother of Andrei
- Aleksandr Krasko (born 1972), athlete
- Yuri Kurilsky (1979-2007), serial killer
- Yuliy Kuznetsov (born 2003), footballer
- Henadz Laptseu (born 1998), weightlifter
- Aleksey Lesnichiy (born 1978), high jumper
- Galina Nikandrova (born 1987), Olympic rhythmic gymnast
- Sergei Ostapchuk (1990-2011), ice hockey player
- Sergey Punko (born 1981), paralympic swimmer
- Sviatlana Sakhanenka (born 1989), cross-country skier
- Alex Shabunya (born 1977), bodybuilder
- Vadim Sushko (born 1986), ice hockey defenceman
- Artem Teplov (born 1992), footballer
- Vitaly Teterev (born 1983), chess player
- Artyom Volkov (born 1985), ice hockey player
- Roman Volkov (born 1987), footballer
- Alexander Yeronov (born 1989), ice hockey player
- Sergei Zadelenov (born 1976), ice hockey centre

== See also ==
- FC Naftan Novopolotsk
- Novopolotsk (bandy club)
