= Artyom Volkov =

Belarusian ice hockey player

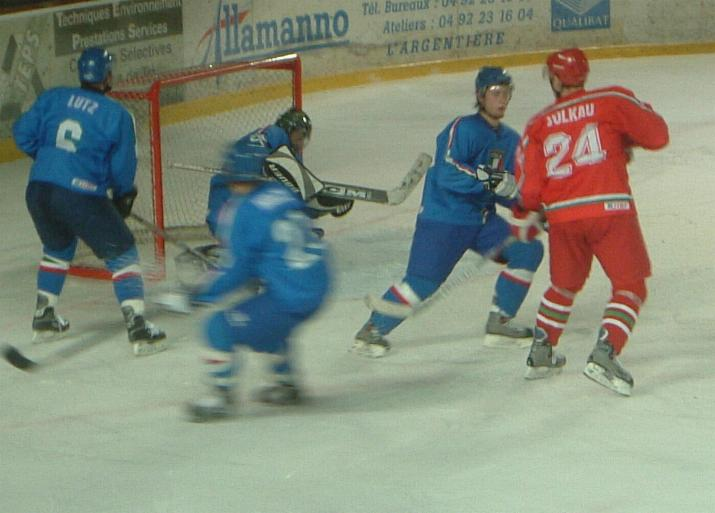
- Volkov, far right, in 2003
- Born: 28 January 1985 (age 40); Navapolatsk, Soviet Union
- Height: 6 ft 0 in (183 cm)
- Weight: 185 lb (84 kg; 13 st 3 lb)
- Position: Right wing
- Shot: Left
- Played for: HC Dinamo-Molodechno; Dinamo Minsk; Avangard Omsk
- National team: Belarus
- Playing career: 2000–2021

Artyom Leonidovich Volkov (Russian: Артём Леонидович Волков; born 28 January 1985) is a Belarusian professional ice hockey player. He spent most of his career, which lasted from 2000 to 2021, in the Belarusian Extraliga, though also played four seasons in the Kontinental Hockey League. Internationally he played for the Belarus national team at five World Championships.

== International ==
Volkov was named to the Belarus national team for the 2014 IIHF World Championship.
