= Vadim Sushko =

Belarusian ice hockey player

- Born: April 27, 1986 (age 38)
- Height: 5 ft 10 in (178 cm)
- Weight: 201 lb (91 kg; 14 st 5 lb)
- Position: Defenceman
- Belarus team Former teams: Shakhtar Soligorsk; Dinamo Minsk
- National team: Belarus
- Playing career: 2008–present

Vadim Ivanovich Sushko (Russian: Вадим Иванович Сушко) (born 27 April 1986 in Navapolatsk, Byelorussian SSR, Soviet Union) is a Belarusian professional ice hockey defenceman. He currently plays for HC Vitebsk of the Belarusian Extraleague. During the 2008–09 season he also appeared for Dinamo Minsk of the Kontinental Hockey League.
