= Vitali Kiryushchenkov =

Belarusian ice hockey forward

- Born: January 31, 1992 (age 33) Novopolotsk, Belarus
- Height: 6 ft 1 in (185 cm)
- Weight: 196 lb (89 kg; 14 st 0 lb)
- Position: Forward
- Shoots: Left
- Belarus team Former teams: Metallurg Zhlobin; HC Dinamo Minsk
- Playing career: 2012–present

Vitali Kiryushchenkov (born January 31, 1992) is a Belarusian professional ice hockey forward currently playing for Metallurg Zhlobin of the Belarusian Extraleague.

Kiryushchenkov previously played for HC Dinamo Minsk of the Kontinental Hockey League during the 2013–14 KHL season. He played thirty regular season games and scored two goals and one assist.
