= Vitaly Teterev =

Belarusian chess grandmaster (born 1983)

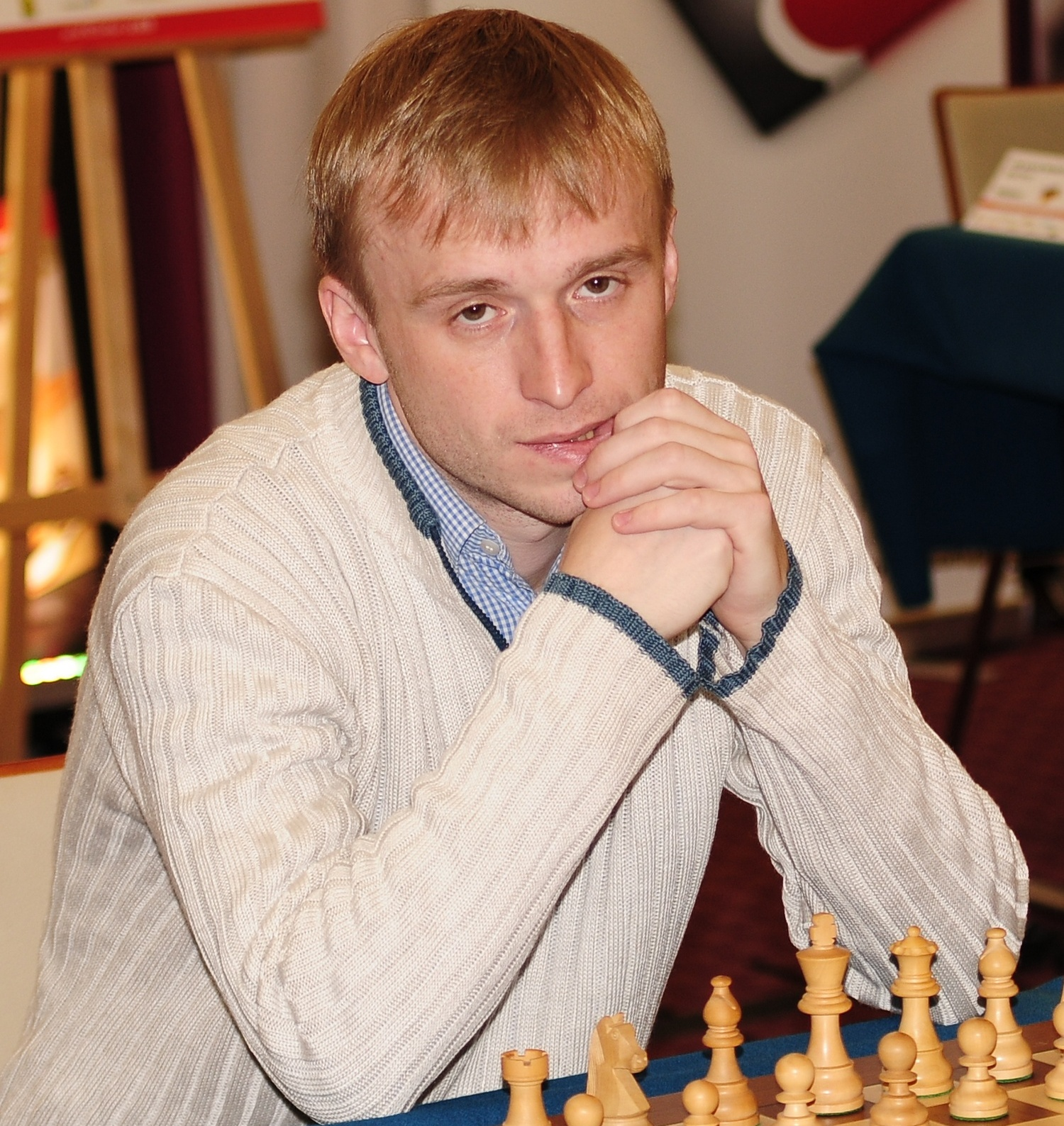

Personal information
- Born: January 7, 1983 (age 43) Navapolatsk, Belarus

Chess career
- Country: Belarus
- Title: Grandmaster (2007)
- Peak rating: 2539 (November 2010)

Vitaly Teterev (Russian: Виталий Тетерев; born January 7, 1983) is a Belarusian chess player. He was awarded the title Grandmaster by FIDE in 2007.

Teterev played on the Belarusian national team at the Chess Olympiad in 2010 and 2012, and at the European Team Chess Championship in 2013. In the 2010 Chess Olympiad, he took the gold medal for the best individual performance on board three. He scored 7/8 points with a performance rating of 2853.
