= Alex Shabunya =

Belarusian bodybuilder

- Professional bodybuilder
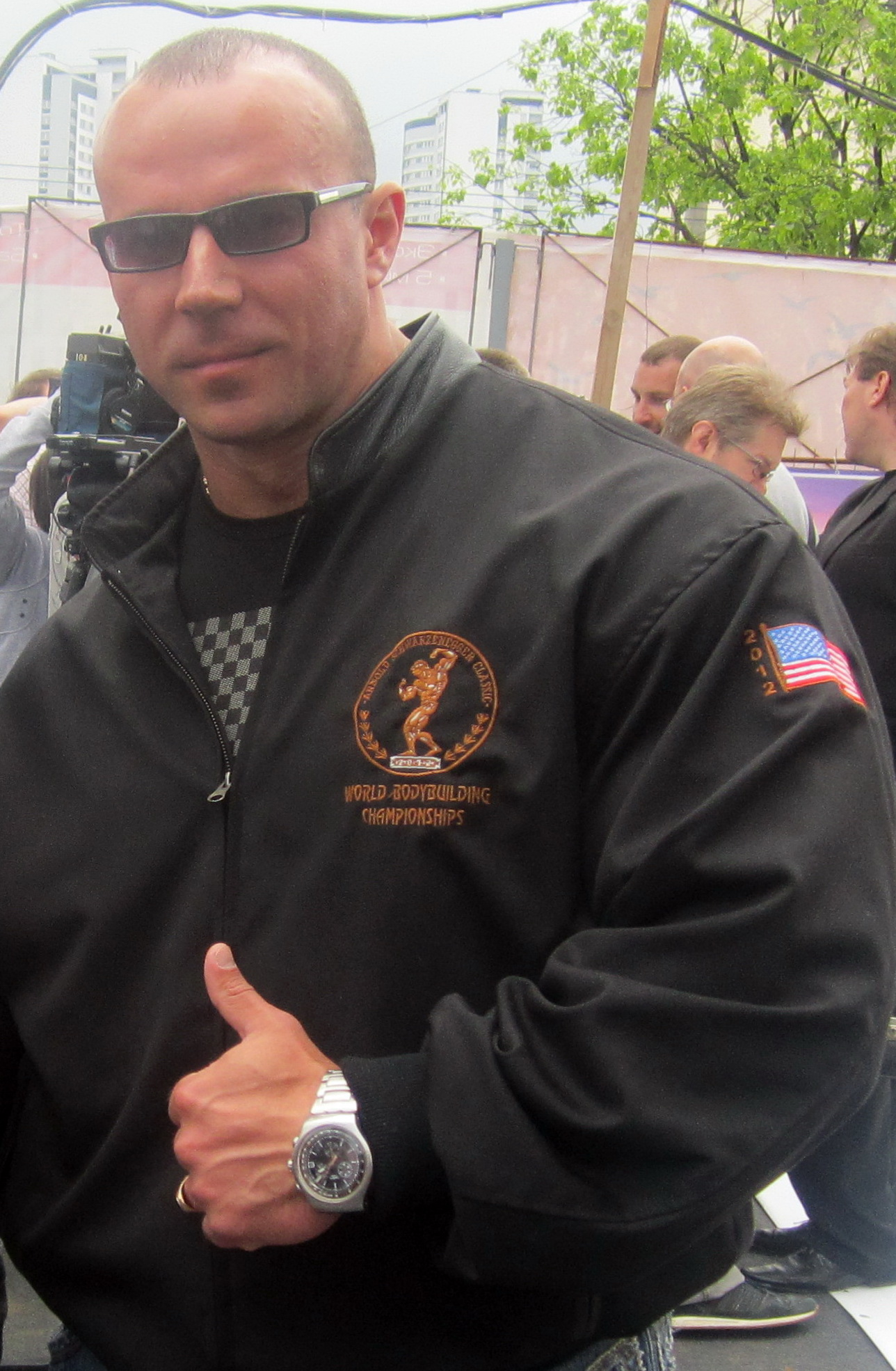

Personal info
- Born: October 4, 1977 (age 49); Navapolatsk, Belarus

Best statistics
- Height: 6 ft 1 in (185 cm)
- Weight: 271–287 lb (123–130 kg)

Alex Shabunya (Belarusian: Аляксей Алегавіч Шабуня, Russian: Алексей Олегович Шабуня ; born 4 October 1977 in Navapolatsk, Belarus) is a Belarusian professional bodybuilder.

Before taking up bodybuilding Alex Shabunya was doing skiing, boxing and wrestling.

In 1995, Alex Shabunya started gym training. His first trainer was Sergei Muchenko.

In 1997, Alex Shabunya took part in a number of WABBA tournaments. In 1998, Shabunya made his IFBB debut. Shabunya is a seven-time Mr Belarus.

In 2005 Shabunya became a member of the IronWorld Club. He moved to the capital Minsk and began to train on his own. He won the 2005 Eastern Europe title, the 2005 Iron Man Grand Prix and the 2005 Iron World tournament.

== Personal life ==
Alex Shabunya lives in Minsk, Belarus. He is a firefighter at the Belarusian Ministry of Emergency Situations.

== Competitive stats ==
- Height: 6 ft 1 in (185 cm)
- Off-season weight: 287 pounds (130 kg)
- Competition weight: 271 pounds (123 kg)
- Arms: 22 in (56 cm)
- Chest: 55 in (140 cm)
- Thigh: 32 in (81 cm)

== Competitive history ==
- 2000 IFBB European Amateur Championships, Heavyweight, 15th
- 2001 IFBB European Amateur Championships, Heavyweight, 13th
- 2003 IFBB European Amateur Championships, Super Heavyweight, 3rd

== See also ==
- IFBB Professional League
