= Aleksandr Frantsev =

Belarusian footballer

Personal information
- Date of birth: 28 June 1997 (age 29)
- Place of birth: Novopolotsk, Vitebsk Oblast, Belarus
- Height: 1.83 m (6 ft 0 in)
- Position: Defender

Youth career
- 2013–2017: Naftan Novopolotsk

Senior career*
Years	Team	Apps	(Gls)
2017–2019	Naftan Novopolotsk	9	(0)
2020–2022	Smorgon	63	(2)
2023	Naftan Novopolotsk	12	(0)
- * Club domestic league appearances and goals as of 31 December 2023

Aleksandr Frantsev (Belarusian: Аляксандр Францаў; Russian: Александр Францев; born 28 June 1997) is a Belarusian professional footballer.
