= Bjarke =

- Gender: Male

Origin
- Region of origin: Denmark

Bjarke is a Danish masculine given name. People bearing the name Bjarke include:

- Bjarke Ingels (born 1974), Danish architect
  - Bjarke Ingels Group (BIG), Copenhagen and New York based group of architects, designers, and builders
- Bjarke Mogensen (born 1985), Danish accordionist
- Bjarke Møller (born 1985), Danish ice hockey player
- Bjarke Refslund (born 1981), Danish mountain bike orienteer
