= Novopolotsk (bandy club) =

Belarusian bandy club

Novopolotsk are a bandy club from Belarus.
