= Sven Klimbacher =

Austrian ice hockey player

- Born: 12 September 1981 (age 43); Sankt Veit an der Glan, Austria
- Height: 5 ft 10 in (178 cm)
- Weight: 192 lb (87 kg; 13 st 10 lb)
- Position: Defense
- Shoots: Left
- EBEL team Former teams: Free Agent; EC VSV; EHC Black Wings Linz; HC TWK Innsbruck; Graz 99ers Vienna Capitals
- National team: Austria
- Playing career: 1999–present

Sven Klimbacher (born 12 September 1981) is an Austrian professional ice hockey defenseman who is currently an unrestricted free agent who most recently played for the Graz 99ers of the Austrian Hockey League. After two seasons with the Vienna Capitals, Klimbacher was re-signed to a two-year contract extension on 4 May 2014.

On 25 August 2016, Klimbacher accepted a try-out as a free agent to return to former club, Graz 99ers. After a successful try-out, Klimbacher agreed to sign a one-year deal on 19 September 2016. In the 2016–17 season, he was a mainstay on the 99ers blueline, appearing in 54 games for 7 points. However, after a short playoff-run his contract with the 99ers was not renewed resulting in his release as a free agent.

Klimbacher competed in the 2013 IIHF World Championship as a member of the Austria men's national ice hockey team.
