= Florian Iberer =

Austrian ice hockey player

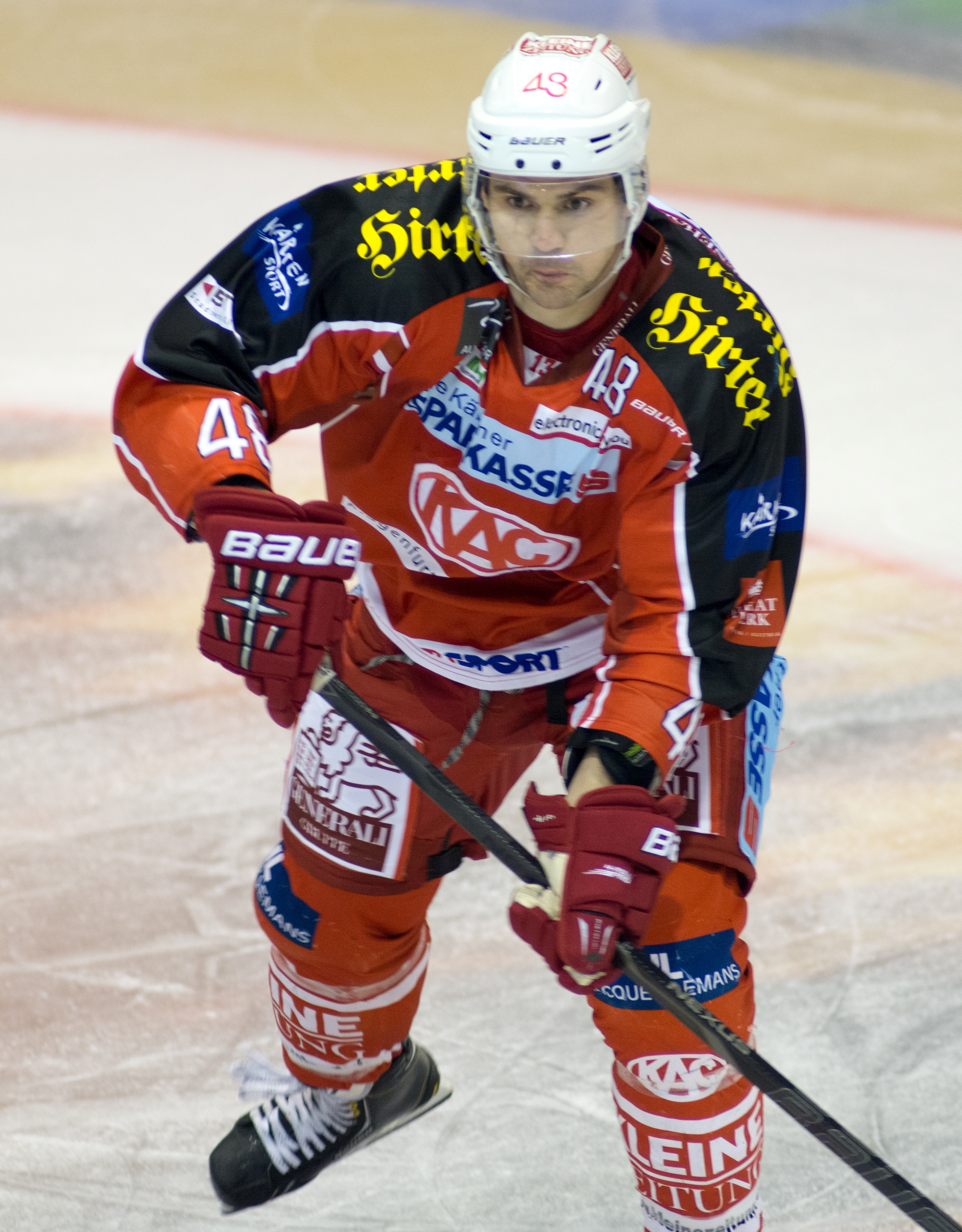
- Iberer on the ice.
- Born: 7 December 1982 (age 43) Graz, Austria
- Height: 6 ft 1 in (185 cm)
- Weight: 209 lb (95 kg; 14 st 13 lb)
- Position: Defence
- Shot: Left
- Played for: Graz 99ers EHC Black Wings Linz; Dresdner Eislöwen; IF Troja/Ljungby; EC KAC; Vienna Capitals; HC Litvínov
- National team: Austria
- Playing career: 1999–2019

Florian Iberer (born 7 December 1982) is an Austrian former professional ice hockey Defenseman.

== Playing career ==
Iberer began his career playing for the Graz 99ers where he played from 1999 to 2005. He then moved to the United States, playing in the United Hockey League for the Elmira Jackals and the Quad City Mallards, the ECHL with the Alaska Aces and the International Hockey League with the Kalamazoo Wings before moving back to Austria in 2007 with Black Wings Linz. After playing two seasons for the EHC Black Wings Linz he moved back to Graz to play for his home team, before enjoying a tenure with EC KAC.

On June 22, 2014, Iberer joined his fourth Austrian club as a free agent, signing a one-year contract with the Vienna Capitals. After two seasons with the Capitals, Iberer was not re-signed by the club and initially agreed to a contract with KS Cracovia of the Polska Hokej Liga on August 13, 2016.

One month on from signing in Poland, Iberer opted to leave before opening of the season to return to North America for the first time since 2008, agreeing to a one-year deal with the Reading Royals of the ECHL on September 14, 2016. In his lone season with the Royals in 2016–17, Iberer led the blueline in scoring with 41 points in 70 games.

As a free agent, Iberer opted to return home to his original club in Graz 99ers, agreeing to a two-year deal on May 4, 2017.

== Career statistics ==
=== Regular season and playoffs ===
			Regular season					Playoffs
Season	Team	League	GP	G	A	Pts	PIM	GP	G	A	Pts	PIM
1999–2000	Graz99ers	AUT.2	24	0	4	4	16	—	—	—	—	—
2000–01	Graz99ers	AUT	39	0	1	1	8	—	—	—	—	—
2001–02	Graz99ers	AUT	32	1	4	5	6	4	0	0	0	2
2002–03	Graz99ers	AUT	36	0	2	2	18	3	0	1	1	4
2003–04	Graz99ers	AUT	44	1	4	5	16	3	0	0	0	2
2004–05	Graz99ers	AUT	48	2	4	6	43	—	—	—	—	—
2005–06	Elmira Jackals	UHL	61	3	27	30	37	—	—	—	—	—
2005–06	Quad City Mallards	UHL	10	0	3	3	7	—	—	—	—	—
2006–07	Alaska Aces	ECHL	49	2	13	15	46	—	—	—	—	—
2007–08	Kalamazoo Wings	IHL	33	9	21	30	10	—	—	—	—	—
2007–08	EHC Liwest Black Wings Linz	AUT	3	0	0	0	6	11	3	0	3	12
2008–09	EHC Liwest Black Wings Linz	AUT	52	5	19	24	42	10	2	0	2	12
2009–10	Graz99ers	AUT	27	5	14	19	24	—	—	—	—	—
2010–11	Graz99ers	AUT	54	3	13	16	20	4	0	2	2	4
2011–12	Dresdner Eislöwen	GER.2	47	15	16	31	4	—	—	—	—	—
2012–13	IF Troja/Ljungby	Allsv	25	3	6	9	4	4	0	2	2	4
2012–13	EC KAC	AUT	25	4	9	13	2	15	1	7	8	2
2013–14	EC KAC	AUT	54	10	20	30	4	—	—	—	—	—
2014–15	Vienna Capitals	AUT	54	6	22	28	10	15	4	5	10	4
2015–16	Vienna Capitals	AUT	52	8	20	28	12	5	0	1	1	0
2016–17	Reading Royals	ECHL	70	9	32	41	25	6	0	1	1	2
2017–18	Graz99ers	AUT	31	3	4	7	12	—	—	—	—	—
2017–18	HC Verva Litvínov	ELH	10	0	1	1	2	—	—	—	—	—
2018–19	Újpesti TE	EL	4	2	2	4	4	—	—	—	—	—
2018–19	VEU Feldkirch	AlpsHL	2	0	0	0	0	—	—	—	—	—
2018–19	VEU Feldkirch	AUT.2	—	—	—	—	—	2	0	3	3	2
AUT totals			551	48	136	184	223	70	10	17	27	42

=== International ===
Year	Team	Event	GP	G	A	Pts	PIM
2002	Austria	WJC D1	5	0	0	0	2
2013	Austria	OGQ	3	0	0	0	0
2013	Austria	WC	7	2	0	2	0
2014	Austria	OG	4	0	0	0	0
2015	Austria	WC	6	0	0	0	0
Senior totals			20	2	0	2	0
