= Andrei Korabeinikov =

Kazakhstani ice hockey player

- Born: April 1, 1987 (age 37); Ust-Kamenogorsk, Kazakh SSR, Soviet Union
- Height: 6 ft 0 in (183 cm)
- Weight: 181 lb (82 kg; 12 st 13 lb)
- Position: Defence
- Shoots: Left
- VHL team Former teams: Dizel Penza; Barys Astana; Yugra Khanty-Mansiysk; Metallurg Novokuznetsk
- National team: Kazakhstan
- NHL draft: Undrafted
- Playing career: 2003–present

Andrei Viktorovich Korabeinikov (Russian: Андрей Викторович Корабейников; born April 1, 1987) is a Kazakhstani professional ice hockey player who is currently playing for Dizel Penza of the Supreme Hockey League (VHL).

Korabeinikov made his Kontinental Hockey League debut playing with Metallurg Novokuznetsk during the 2009–10 KHL season.

== International ==
Korabeinikov competed in the 2012 IIHF World Championship as a member of the Kazakhstan men's national ice hockey team.
