= Alexander Yeronov =

Belarusian ice hockey player

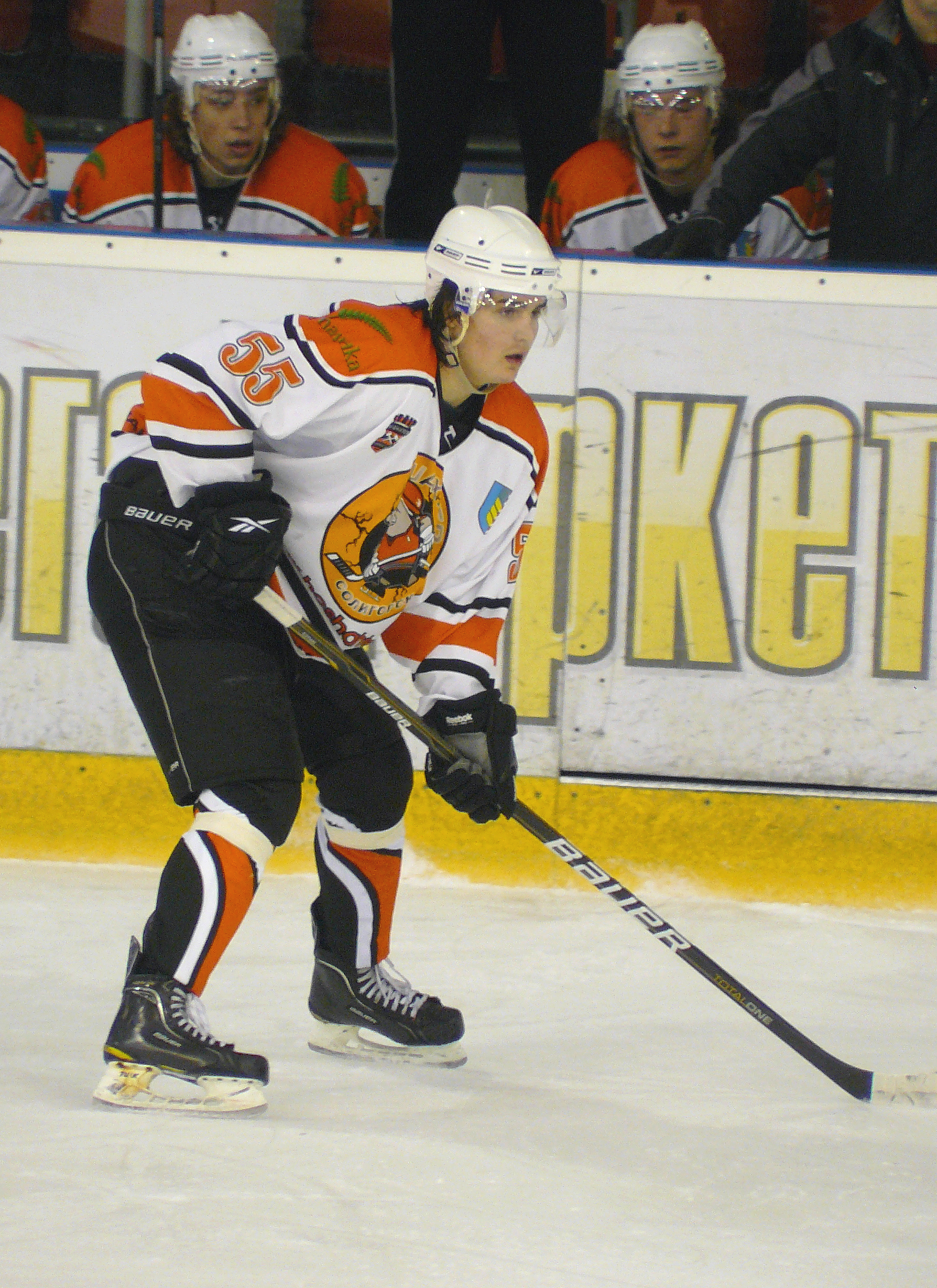
- Born: May 5, 1989 (age 36); Novopolotsk, Belarus
- Height: 6 ft 2 in (188 cm)
- Weight: 190 lb (86 kg; 13 st 8 lb)
- Position: Defense
- Shoots: Left
- BXL team: HC Shakhter Soligorsk
- National team: Belarus
- Playing career: 2006–present

Alexander Yeronov (born May 5, 1989) is a Belarusian ice hockey player.

Yeronov competed in the 2013 IIHF World Championship as a member of the Belarus men's national ice hockey team.
