= Koba Jass =

Latvian professional ice hockey forward (born 1990)

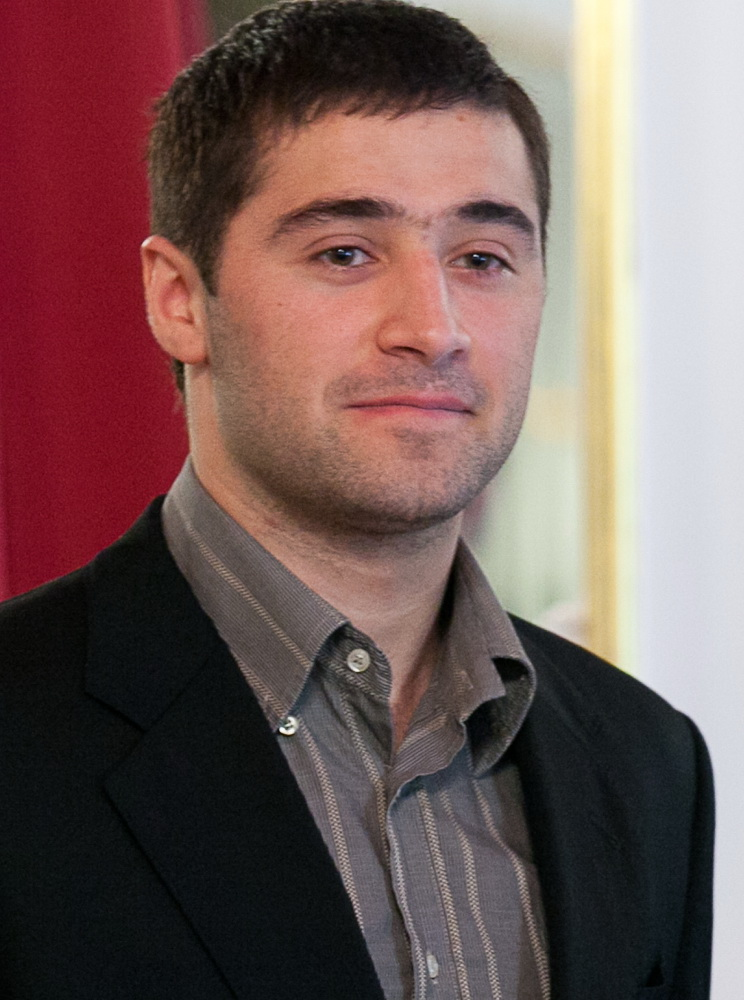
- Born: May 1, 1990 (age 34); Riga, Latvian SSR, Soviet Union
- Height: 6 ft 0 in (183 cm)
- Weight: 192 lb (87 kg; 13 st 10 lb)
- Position: Left wing
- Shoots: Left
- ELH team Former teams: HC Bílí Tygři Liberec; Kazzinc-Torpedo; HC Kladno
- National team: Latvia
- NHL draft: Undrafted
- Playing career: 2007–present

Koba Jass (born May 1, 1990) is a Latvian professional ice hockey forward, currently playing for HK Kurbads in Latvian Hockey Higher League. He is a two time Latvian champion.

== Career ==
He started his career in 2007 playing for ASK Ogre, which also played in the Latvian championships. In the 2009-2010 season he represented Riga's Dinamo Juniors in the Belarus Extraleague (was one of the captain's assistants.) From 2010-2011 he represented Liepaja Metalurgs in the Belarus Extraleague and also the second team in the Latvian championships.

In the 2011-2012 season he played for Kazakh club Ustjkamenogorsk "Kazzinc-Torpedo" in the Supreme Hockey League and Kazakh championships. In the middle of 2012 Jass trialled for KHL club Dinamo Riga, but he couldn't secure his place at the club. Later that season he played for Slovak Extraleague club HK Zilina, and also Czech Extraleague club HC Kladno.

== International ==
At the 2011 and 2012 World Hockey championships, and at the 2014 Winter Olympics, he competed with the Latvia men's national ice hockey team.

He was named in the Latvia men's national ice hockey team for the competition at the 2014 IIHF World Championship.

== Personal ==
His cousins Māris and Mareks Jass are also hockey players. He is of Georgian descent through his father and of Romani descent through his mother.

== Career statistics ==
=== Regular season and playoffs ===
			Regular season					Playoffs
Season	Team	League	GP	G	A	Pts	PIM	GP	G	A	Pts	PIM
2006–07	HK Liepājas Metalurgs	LAT U18	—	8	4	12	12	—	—	—	—	—
2007–08	ASK/Ogre	LAT	24	1	2	3	12	2	0	0	0	0
2008–09	ASK/Ogre	BLR	40	2	5	7	16	—	—	—	—	—
2008–09	ASK/Ogre	LAT	—	—	—	—	—	12	1	1	2	8
2009–10	Dinamo Juniors Rīga	BLR	42	4	2	6	22	—	—	—	—	—
2009–10	Dinamo Juniors Rīga	LAT	—	—	—	—	—	7	0	1	1	4
2010–11	HK Liepājas Metalurgs	BLR	35	4	2	6	16	—	—	—	—	—
2010–11	HK Liepājas Metalurgs–2	LAT	13	7	17	24	10	3	1	2	3	2
2010–11	HK SMScredit	LAT	1	0	1	1	29	—	—	—	—	—
2011–12	Kazzinc–Torpedo	VHL	19	1	1	2	18	2	0	0	0	0
2011–12	Kazzinc–Torpedo–2	KAZ	20	4	5	9	40	—	—	—	—	—
2012–13	Vlci Žilina	SVK	24	4	6	10	55	—	—	—	—	—
2012–13	Rytíři Kladno	ELH	8	3	3	6	4	10	2	1	3	29
2013–14	Bílí Tygři Liberec	ELH	33	5	1	6	33	3	0	0	0	0
2014–15	Bílí Tygři Liberec	ELH	23	2	0	2	6	—	—	—	—	—
2014–15	HC Benátky nad Jizerou	CZE.2	—	—	—	—	—	8	1	2	3	2
2015–16	HK 36 HANT Skalica	SVK	27	2	8	10	22	—	—	—	—	—
2015–16	MHC Mountfield Martin	SVK	14	0	10	10	6	4	0	1	1	2
2016–17	HK Prizma Rīga	LAT	1	0	0	0	27	—	—	—	—	—
2016–17	HK Kurbads	LAT	11	4	8	12	16	8	1	1	2	43
2017–18	HC Nové Zámky	SVK	17	2	1	3	32	—	—	—	—	—
2017–18	HC Nové Zámky B	SVK.2	11	4	8	12	16	—	—	—	—	—
2017–18	Mississippi RiverKings	SPHL	17	2	6	8	13	—	—	—	—	—
2018–19	Torpedo Ust–Kamenogorsk	KAZ	7	0	0	0	8	—	—	—	—	—
2018–19	HK Kurbads	LAT	10	1	3	4	10	10	1	0	1	6
2019–20	HK Kurbads	LAT	8	0	4	4	4	—	—	—	—	—
2021–22	HK Olimp/Venta 2002	LAT	31	3	20	23	55	9	0	0	0	25
LAT totals			99	16	55	71	163	51	4	5	9	88
BLR totals			117	10	9	19	54	—	—	—	—	—
SVK totals			82	8	25	33	115	4	0	1	1	2

=== International ===
Year	Team	Event	GP	G	A	Pts	PIM
2009	Latvia	WJC	6	0	0	0	0
2012	Latvia	WC	7	0	0	0	27
2013	Latvia	WC	4	0	1	1	0
2014	Latvia	OG	3	0	0	0	4
2014	Latvia	WC	4	1	0	1	0
2015	Latvia	WC	4	0	0	0	2
Junior totals			6	0	0	0	0
Senior totals			22	1	1	2	33
