= Pavel Chernook =

Belarusian ice hockey player

- Born: September 28, 1986 (age 39) Novopolotsk, Belarus
- Height: 6 ft 4 in (193 cm)
- Weight: 234 lb (106 kg; 16 st 10 lb)
- Position: Defense
- Shot: Left
- Played for: Yunost Minsk; Khimik-SKA Novopolotsk; Keramin Minsk; HC Shakhtyor Soligorsk; HC Dinamo Minsk; Lions de Lyon; HKM Zvolen; KS Cracovia; Diables Rouges de Briançon
- National team: Belarus
- Playing career: 2003–2021

Pavel Chernook (born September 28, 1986) is a Belarusian professional ice hockey player who is currently playing for the Diables Rouges de Briançon of the Ligue Magnus.

Chernook previously played 52 games in the Kontinental Hockey League for HC Dinamo Minsk. He competed in the 2012 and 2013 IIHF World Championship as a member of the Belarus men's national ice hockey team.

== Career statistics ==
			Regular season					Playoffs
Season	Team	League	GP	G	A	Pts	PIM	GP	G	A	Pts	PIM
2002–03	MGU-Pingviny Moskva	Russia3	34	1	4	5	18	—	—	—	—	—
2002–03	Yunost Minsk	Belarus	4	0	0	0	2	—	—	—	—	—
2003–04	HC CSKA Moscow-2	Russia3	56	0	2	2	46	—	—	—	—	—
2003–04	Yunior Minsk	Belarus	1	0	0	0	0	—	—	—	—	—
2004–05	Khimik-SKA Novopolotsk	Belarus	12	0	0	0	2	—	—	—	—	—
2004–05	Khimik-SKA Novopolotsk-2	Belarus Vysshaya	22	1	4	5	28	—	—	—	—	—
2005–06	Khimik-SKA Novopolotsk	Belarus	45	0	2	2	50	—	—	—	—	—
2005–06	Khimik-SKA Novopolotsk-2	Belarus Vysshaya	1	0	0	0	0	—	—	—	—	—
2006–07	Khimik-SKA Novopolotsk	Belarus	48	4	11	15	109	7	1	1	2	24
2006–07	Khimik-SKA Novopolotsk-2	Belarus Vysshaya	3	0	2	2	0	—	—	—	—	—
2007–08	Khimik-SKA Novopolotsk	Belarus	35	3	7	10	146	4	0	0	0	6
2008–09	Keramin Minsk	Belarus	50	2	7	9	58	4	0	1	1	6
2009–10	Keramin Minsk	Belarus	49	9	7	16	56	3	0	0	0	2
2010–11	HC Shakhtyor Soligorsk	Belarus	44	2	10	12	66	1	0	0	0	0
2011–12	HC Shakhtyor Soligorsk	Belarus	41	2	2	4	28	10	1	0	1	34
2012–13	HC Dynamo Minsk	KHL	41	1	2	3	34	—	—	—	—	—
2013–14	HC Dynamo Minsk	KHL	8	0	1	1	2	—	—	—	—	—
2014–15	HC Dynamo Minsk	KHL	3	0	0	0	6	—	—	—	—	—
2014–15	HC Shakhtyor Soligorsk	Belarus	45	3	5	8	61	12	0	3	3	13
2015–16	Yunost Minsk	Belarus	39	1	12	13	38	14	1	2	3	0
2016–17	Yunost Minsk	Belarus	29	3	13	16	22	8	0	1	1	12
2017–18	Lyon HC	Ligue Magnus	41	8	17	25	79	6	0	3	3	2
2018–19	HKM Zvolen	Slovak	10	0	0	0	2	—	—	—	—	—
2018–19	Cracovia Krakow	Poland	—	—	—	—	—	16	1	4	5	12
2020–21	Diables Rouges de Briançon	Ligue Magnus	13	2	1	3	22	—	—	—	—	—
KHL totals			52	1	3	4	42	—	—	—	—	—
Belarus totals			442	29	76	105	638	63	3	8	11	97
