= 2011 IIHF World Championship =

2011 edition of the IIHF World Championship

Tournament details
- Host country: Slovakia
- Dates: 29 April – 15 May
- Opened by: Ivan Gašparovič
- Teams: 16

Final positions
- Champions: Finland (2nd title)
- Runners-up: Sweden
- Third place: Czech Republic
- Fourth place: Russia

Tournament statistics
- Games played: 56
- Goals scored: 325 (5.8 per game)
- Attendance: 406,804 (7,264 per game)
- Scoring leader: (Finland) Jarkko Immonen (12 points)

Awards
- MVP: (Sweden) Viktor Fasth

The 2011 IIHF World Championship was the 75th IIHF World Championship, an annual international men's ice hockey tournament. It took place between 29 April and 15 May 2011 in Slovakia. The games were played in the Orange Arena in Bratislava, and the Steel Aréna in Košice. The Czech team was the defending champion.

This was the first time the independent Slovakia hosted the World Championships. However, this was the third time that Bratislava co-hosted the World Championships. The first two times were 1959 and 1992, each time with Prague, and while part of Czechoslovakia.

Finland won the gold medal after beating Sweden in the final 6–1. This was the second title for Finland, and the most lopsided final since the knockout playoff format was introduced in 1992.

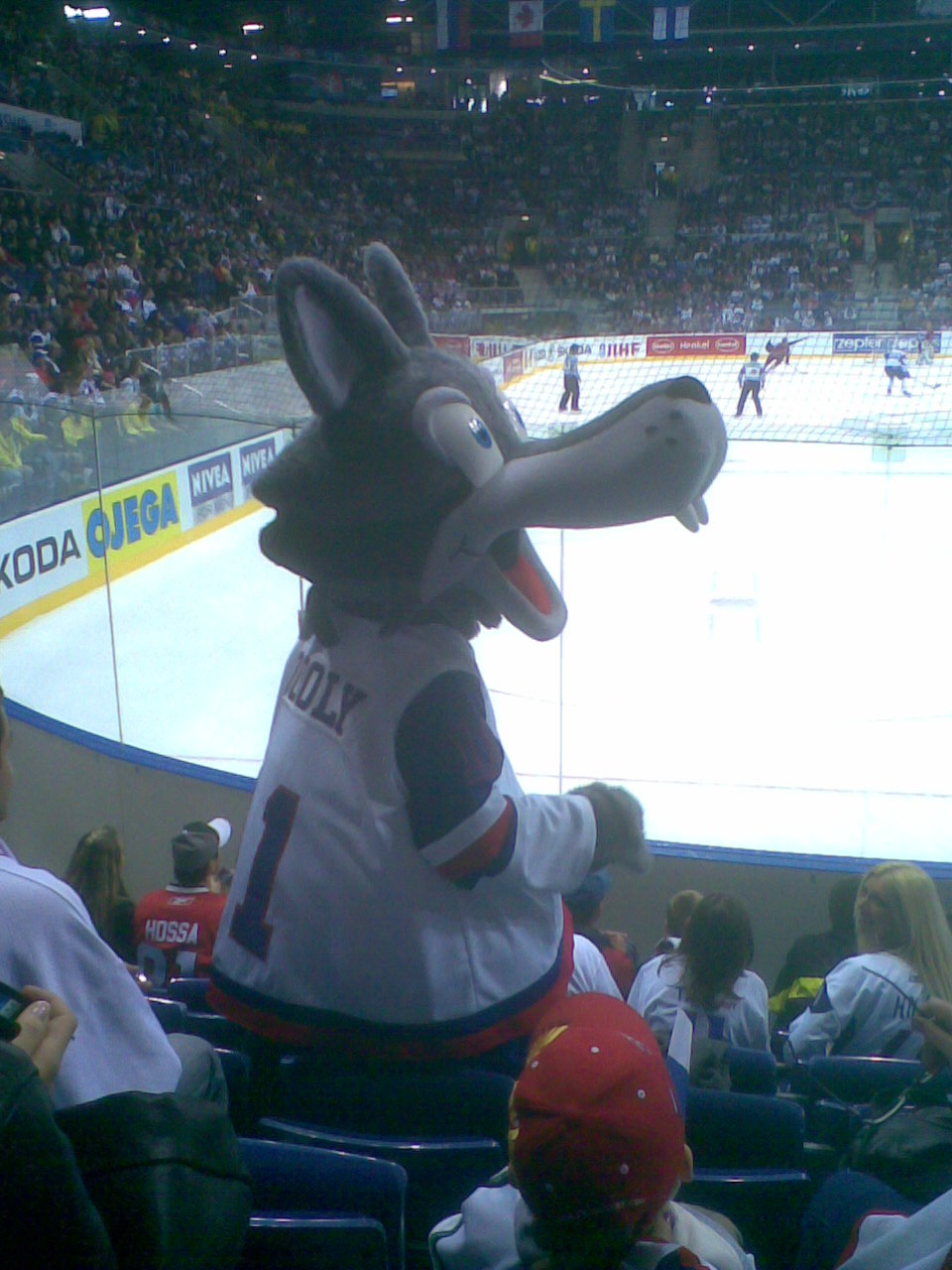
The mascot Goooly

== Tournament format ==
The tournament is divided into four stages. The preliminary round, qualification round and relegation round use a round-robin format with each team playing every other team in its group once. The winner of a game in regulation time will earn 3 points, with the loser earning zero points. The winner of a game decided in overtime or in a shootout will be awarded 2 points, with the loser getting one point. Teams in the preliminary round are divided into four groups of four teams each; the last-place team in each group moves to the relegation round while the remainder move to the qualification round. The qualification round is divided into two groups of six teams each with the top four teams in each group moving to the playoff round. Games played in the preliminary round against teams in the same qualification round group count for the qualification round standings; therefore, teams who were previously in the same Preliminary round group do not play each other again in the qualification round. The relegation round is a single group of four teams with the bottom 2 teams being relegated to Division I of the World Championships. The tournament concludes with the playoff round, which is an 8-team tournament, to determine the winners of the gold, silver and bronze medals.

In the event of a tie in points at the conclusion of the preliminary, qualification or relegation rounds, the following tie-breaker format will be used:

1. Points earned in games against tied teams
2. Goal differential in games against tied teams
3. Highest number of goals in games against tied teams
4. Repetition of steps 1, 2 and 3, in order, including results against the next closest ranked team to the tied teams
5. Repetition of step 4, including the next closest ranked teams one at a time
6. 2010 IIHF World Ranking

== Rosters ==
Each team's roster for the 2011 IIHF World Championship consists of at least 15 skaters (forwards, and defencemen) and 2 goaltenders, and at most 20 skaters and 3 goaltenders. All sixteen participating nations, through the confirmation of their respective national associations, had to submit a roster by the first IIHF directorate meeting on 28 April 2011.

== Summary ==
=== Preliminary round ===
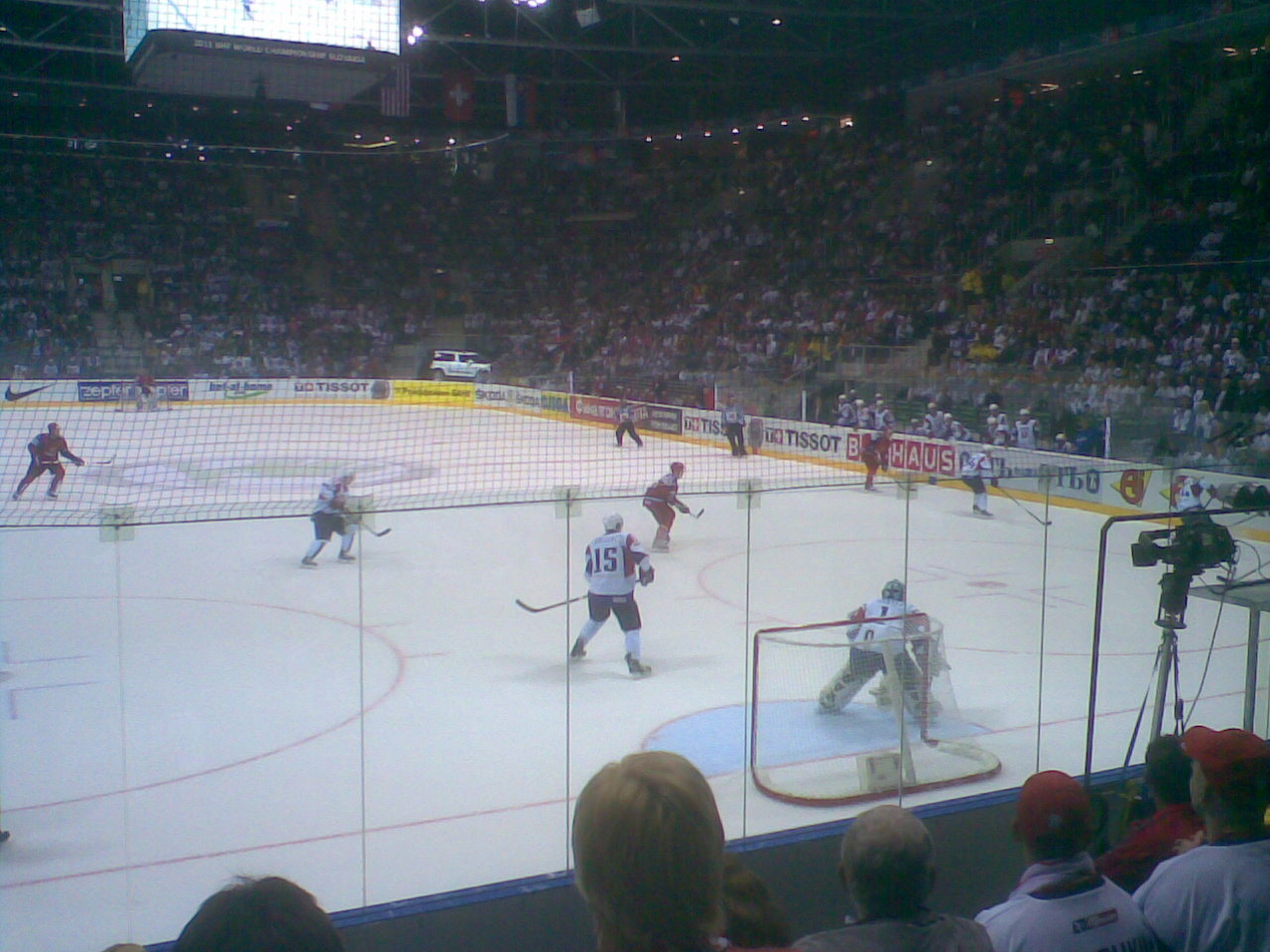
Match between Russia and Slovenia (Group A), 1 May 2011

The first gameday in Group A started with an upset, when Germany went on to win 2–0 against Russia after goals from Thomas Greilinger in the second period and Patrick Reimer, who decided the game with a goal two minutes before the final horn. It was the first win for the German team over Russia in a World Championship and the first one since the 1994 Winter Olympics in Lillehammer. After the second gameday, the group was decided in the outcome who advances and who would battle against relegation. Germany pulled another surprise victory over host Slovakia; after being down 4–0, Slovakia started a comeback but could only cut the deficit to one, losing by a final of 4–3. Germany was the group winner and advanced alongside Slovakia and Russia into the second round, while Slovenia finished fourth and went to the relegation round. The last time Germany won a preliminary round group was 78 years ago, in 1933.

Group B saw the first overtime of the tournament in a game between Switzerland and France. Julien Vauclair scored the decisive goal after 1:46 minutes played in overtime. Canada defeated Switzerland after overtime to capture first place, while France won against Belarus to go through to the qualifying round and sent Belarus to the relegation round.

In Group C, Sweden played against Norway and it was a back-and-forth game. Sweden went up 3–1 in the first period, but Norway fought back and at the end it was 4–4 after 60 minutes. The overtime went scoreless and so it went into a shootout; Per-Åge Skrøder scored on the first try for Norway and Eriksson missed on the first for Sweden and so Norway won 5–4, making it their first win against the Scandinavian rival in World Championship history. Sweden and the US team both got their second wins as the United States came back from being down 0–2 to win 4–2 against Norway. On the last gameday, Sweden captured the top seed in the group after a 6–2 win over the USA. Norway followed those two in the qualifying round after a 5–0 win over Austria, who found themselves in the relegation round.

Group D saw two wins from the respective favorites at the start: Finland and the Czech Republic. The picture was the same on the second game day, though Finland needed a shootout against Latvia to win 3–2. Jarkko Immonen scored the game-winning goal. Denmark needed a win over Latvia to advance and they got one after a shootout; 3–2 was the result, Latvia then saw themselves facing the relegation.

=== Qualifying round ===
Every game in Group E was close, each was decided by one goal. The Czech team was still perfect after their fifth win, defeating Russia 3–2. Alongside them, Germany, Russia and Finland qualified for the quarterfinals and the Czech team was set to win the group with one more game to play. The host Slovakia was eliminated after losing to Finland 1–2. After the last game day, the Czech team was still perfect after winning 5–2 against Germany.

In Group F, Canada and Sweden played each other to determine the group winner, and the United States also qualified for the quarterfinals. Switzerland and Norway played for the last spot in the final round as Norway will face France which are already eliminated before their last game. Switzerland won 5–3 against the United States but they were still eliminated because Norway defeated France 5–2 to advance to the quarterfinals.

=== Relegation round ===
After two game days in Group G every team had three points and so the last two games determined the two teams going down and the two that remained in the top division for the next year. Slovenia faced Belarus, while Latvia played against Austria. Belarus crushed Slovenia into the Division A with a 7–1 win to stay in the top division. Austria joined Slovenia in the second division after losing against Latvia 1–4.

=== Playoff round ===
==== Quarterfinals ====
The quarterfinals started with the undefeated Czech Republic against Team USA. The United States started off better but Jaromír Jágr scored for the Czechs to take a 1–0 into the first intermission. Jágr scored the second goal during a 5 on 3 power play after a strong shot from the right side. The third goal came after a good combination over the whole ice leading to a goal by Tomáš Plekanec. Jágr became the man of the match after he scored his third goal four minutes before the end during another power play and the game ended in a comfortable 4–0 win for the Czech Republic.

In the evening game, Sweden took on Germany and scored the first goal in the first minute by Martin Thörnberg. Germany came right back and tied the game after two minutes as Alexander Barta was credited with the goal. Both teams had chances during the first period but Sweden took the 2–1 lead into the intermission. In the second period, Sweden went up 4–1 before Germany came closer by going 2–4 in the last break. Sweden scored a goal in the last period which was disallowed because a whistle occurred before the goal was scored, however Thörnberg scored his second goal of the night shortly after and Sweden won 5–2 at the end. Both, Thörnberg and Berglund were credited with three points.

Day two of the quarterfinals started with a Nordic matchup as Finland faced Norway. After a scoreless opening period, Norway took the lead after Ken André Olimb scored on a penalty shot. Five minutes later, Finland had the lead after two quick goals. Jarkko Immonen scored his second goal to give Finland a two-goal lead before Jani Lajunen scored to make it 4–1 for the Finnish squad. Three of those four goals were scored during a power play. The third and last period went scoreless again and so Finland won 4–1, Mikael Granlund scored two points in the game alongside Immonen.

The last game of the quarterfinal round brought up a rivalry between Russia and Team Canada. Jason Spezza seemed to be the hero after he scored the first goal after 25 minutes and the lead held into the last period, when Alexei Kaigorodov went on his way to score the equalizer shorthanded, he went by two defenders to put the puck high into the Canadian net. Three minutes later, Ilya Kovalchuk scored to give Russia the lead. Canada pulled the goalie with a minute to go but they did not score, and Russia won the game 2–1.

==== Semifinals ====
The first semifinal was the matchup between the favourite and defending champion, the Czech Republic against Sweden. After the first period went scoreless Patrik Eliáš brought the lead to the Czechs after just 46 seconds into the second period. Sweden struck back twice with goals from Patrik Berglund and Mikael Backlund to take a one-goal lead into the last intermission. Jimmie Ericsson and Marcus Krüger scored to increase Sweden's lead to 4–1. Six minutes before the end, Eliáš scored his second goal and the Czechs gained hope again. They pulled their goaltender with under a minute to go but Sweden's Berglund scored an empty net goal. The Czech Republic was eliminated and Sweden advanced to the final with a 5–2 win.

In the evening game of the semifinals Finland played against Russia. Despite having a so-so tournament so far the Russian team qualified for this late stage of it. Konstantin Barulin was again the goaltender instead of Evgeni Nabokov and the first period ended scoreless. Mikael Granlund scored an airhook goal to take the Finnish team into a 1–0 lead in the second period. The goal has been noted by multiple media outlets worldwide as the finest goal in the tournament, and as one of the finest in the history of international hockey. In the last period Jani Lajunen scored the second goal before Immonen decided the game with the 3–0 goal, assisted by Granlund. Both players received their second point in the game.

==== Bronze medal game ====
The Czech Republic took on Russia for the bronze medal. The first period was a wild one ending in a 3–2 advantage for the Russian team while Ilya Kovalchuk scored two goals. The second period belonged to the Czech team after Petr Průcha scored his second point and Roman Červenka his second goal in the game. After the lead grew to 5–3 Vladimir Tarasenko brought Russia back into the game making it a one-goal game before the last period. After Jan Marek scored to make it 6–4, the Russian team pulled their goalie with two minutes to go. The Czech's Tomáš Plekanec scored an empty net goal to decide the game and give the Czech Republic the bronze medal after winning 7–4.

==== Gold medal game ====
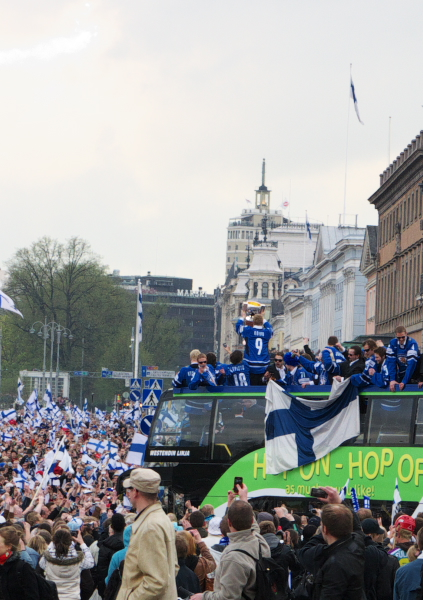
Captain Mikko Koivu holds the trophy as the Finnish team arrives at Market Square in Helsinki to celebrate the title with about 100,000 fans.

The gold medal game was played between Sweden and Finland at the Orange Arena on 15 May.

After a goal-less first period, Sweden opened the game with a 1–0 goal by Magnus Pääjärvi in the second period at 27:40. Seven seconds before the period's end, Finland's Jarkko Immonen scored to tie the game 1–1. Finland took the lead early in the third period, scoring two goals at 42:35 and 43:21 by Nokelainen and Kapanen. Sweden took a time-out before the last period's half but did not manage to regroup, and the tournament was decided by a clear 6–1 victory to Finland by Janne Pesonen's, Mika Pyörälä's and Pihlström goals.

== Host selection ==
Four nations, all located in Europe placed formal bids to host the 2011 IIHF World Championship. Those nations were:

- Slovakia
- Sweden
- Hungary
- Finland

Finland withdrew from bidding before voting began in order to apply for the 2012 World Championship. Finland and Sweden would both later win respective bids to host in 2012 and 2013, but this decision was later changed instead for the two Nordic countries to be joint hosts of the 2012, and 2013 IIHF World Championship editions.

After one round of voting, the winning bid was announced by IIHF president René Fasel on 19 May 2006, at the delegates congress of the International Ice Hockey Federation in Riga, Latvia. Slovakia's bidding cities received 70 votes, followed by the Swedish bid cities of Stockholm, and Gothenburg with 20 votes, and finally the Hungarian bid with 14 votes. The required 50% of the vote had been attained in the first round, which finalized Slovakia's successful bid.

Ivan Gašparovič, the President of Slovakia, was instrumental in Slovakia winning its successful bid, as he came in person to the delegates congress in Riga to endorse his country's bid, and convince the IIHF delegates of the viability of Slovakia. Gašparovič is himself an avid hockey fan and past vice-president of the Slovak Extraliga team, HC Slovan Bratislava.

=== Voting results ===
Country	Votes
Slovakia	70
Sweden	20
Hungary	14

- Finland withdrew from the 2011 bid prior to the start of the congress, postponed 2012.

== Promotions ==
Goooly, mascot of the 2011 World Championship

=== Official song ===
Song Life is a Game by Slovak singer Kristina was officially released on 18 March.

=== Mascot ===
Goooly is the official mascot of the tournament. Goooly is a Gray wolf, and Igor Nemeček, the 2011 IIHF World Championship general director, said he was chosen because: "Wolves are animals which are typically Slovak, evoking our forests and countryside". Over 14,000 entries were submitted for a national contest to name the mascot organized in association with Radio Expres and the Slovak Ice Hockey Federation. It is a word-play on the Slovak words for goal, and/or goals (Slovak: gól, góly). Goooly, the mascot, was subjected to considerable ridicule in the English-speaking world because "gooly" is a well known slang term for a testicle.

=== Motto ===
Slovenská republika. Hokejová republika. (Slovak Republic. Hockey Republic).

=== Ambassadors ===
The official ambassadors of the 2011 IIHF World Championship Slovakia are Slovak hockey players Peter Bondra, Zdeno Chára, Marián Gáborík, Ľubomír Višňovský, Pavol Demitra, Jozef Stümpel, Marián Hossa, Miroslav Šatan and Slovak President Ivan Gašparovič.

== Venues ==
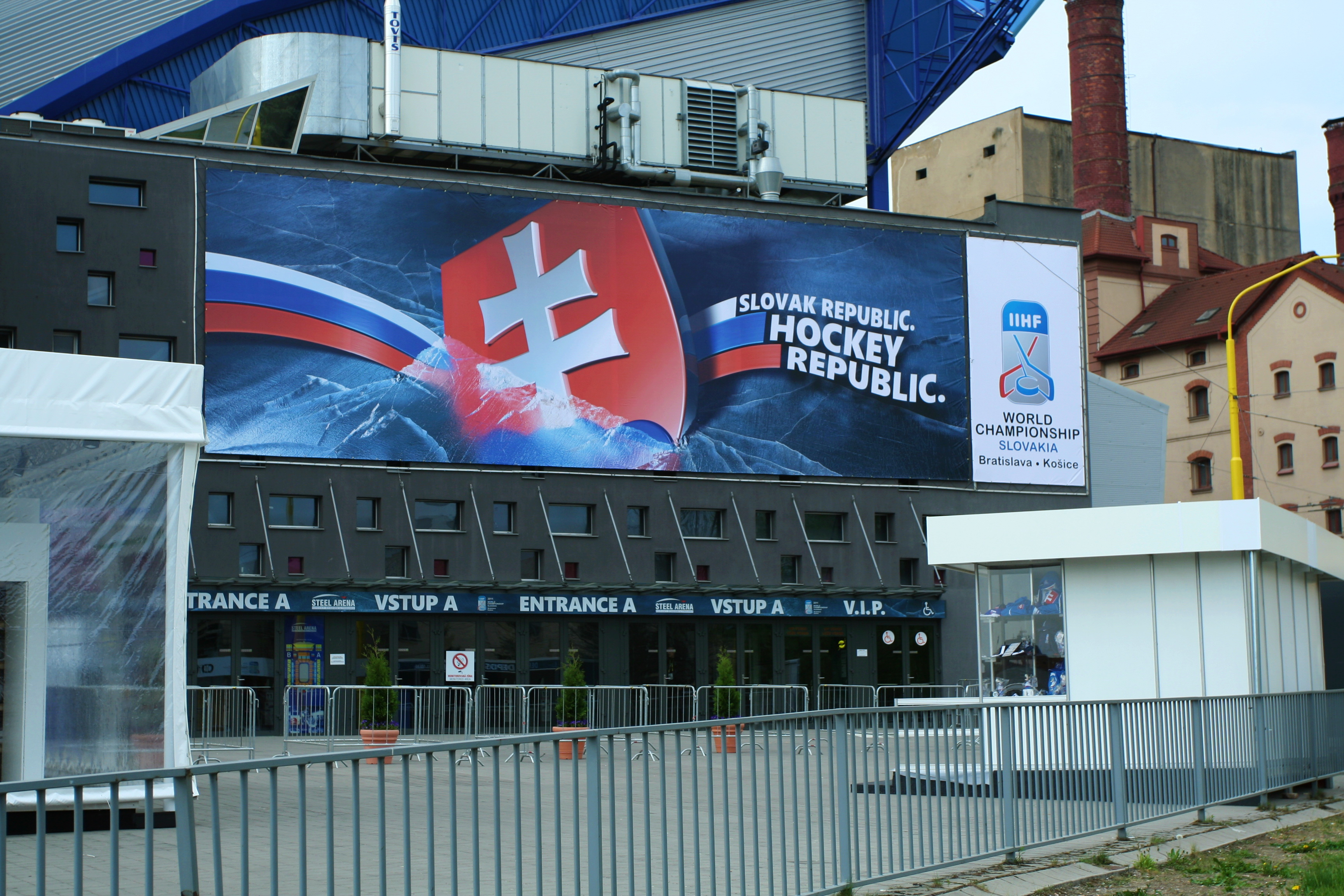
Steel Arena

The Orange Arena in Bratislava, also known as the Ondrej Nepela Arena, was substantially upgraded for the championship, in line with IIHF, Slovak, and international specifications, largely funded by the Slovak government. Construction began on 23 April 2009 and was completed on 30 November 2010. More than €65 million (US$90 million) was spent to install a new roof, modernize facilities, build two new adjacent practice arenas, and bring the seating from 8,350 to 10,000. The Steel Aréna, also known as the Ladislav Troják Arena, which was newly constructed in 2006, had a new €11 million practice rink built adjacent, between April 2009 and February 2010 for the World Championship legacy of future hockey development in Slovakia. The stadium would have the name Orange Arena, but only for the time of World Championship 2011 (29 April to 15 May 2011).

Both arenas were known by their Slovak honorific titles during the 2011 World Championship to correspond with IIHF neutral non-inclusive sponsorship rules. (Samsung Arena as the Ondrej Nepela Arena, and Steel Aréna as the Ladislav Troják Arena.)

Bratislava	Host cities of the 2011 World Championship in Slovakia	Košice
Orange Arena^{1}	Host cities of the 2011 World Championship in Slovakia	Steel Arena^{2}
48°08′38″N 17°06′35″E	Host cities of the 2011 World Championship in Slovakia	48°43′16″N 21°15′27″E
Capacity: 9 246	Host cities of the 2011 World Championship in Slovakia	Capacity: 7 628

- ^1As Ondrej Nepela Arena
- ^2As Ladislav Troják Arena

== Nations ==
The following 16 nations qualified for the elite-pool tournament. 14 nations from Europe, and two nations from North America were represented.

Qualified nations in the 2011 IIHF World Championship, in Slovakia.

Europe

- Austria (Note: Qualified through winning a promotion at the 2010 IIHF World Championship Division I)
- Belarus (Note: Automatic qualifier after a top 14 placement at the 2010 IIHF World Championship)
- Czech Republic
- Denmark
- Finland
- France
- Germany
- Latvia
- Norway
- Russia
- Slovakia (Note: Qualified as hosts (and as automatic qualifier))
- Slovenia
- Sweden
- Switzerland

North America

- Canada
- United States

== Seeding and Groups ==
The seeding in the preliminary round was based on the 2010 IIHF World Ranking, which ends at the conclusion of the 2010 IIHF World Championship. The 2010 Olympics were included. The teams were grouped accordingly by seeding (in parentheses is the corresponding world ranking):

Group A

- Russia (1)
- Slovakia (8)
- Germany (9)
- Slovenia (19)

Group B

- Canada (2)
- Switzerland (7)
- Belarus (10)
- France (15)

Group C

- Sweden (3)
- United States (6)
- Norway (11)
- Austria (14)

Group D

- Finland (4)
- Czech Republic (5)
- Latvia (12)
- Denmark (13)

== Preliminary round ==
Sixteen participating teams were placed in the following four groups. After playing a round-robin, the top three teams in each group advanced to the qualifying round. The last team in each group competes in the relegation round.

Groups A and D played in Bratislava, and groups B and C played in Košice.

Team advanced to Qualifying Round
Team competes in Relegation Round

=== Group A ===
Team	Pld	W	OTW	OTL	L	GF	GA	GD	Pts
Germany	3	2	1	0	0	9	5	+4	8
Russia	3	2	0	0	1	10	9	+1	6
Slovakia	3	1	0	0	2	9	9	0	3
Slovenia	3	0	0	1	2	7	12	−5	1

Source: IIHF

All times are local (UTC+2).

29 April 2011; 16:15	Germany	2–0 (0–0, 1–0, 1–0)	Russia	Orange Arena, Bratislava; Attendance: 9,049

Game reference
Dennis Endras	Goalies	Evgeni Nabokov	Referees: (Canada) Darcy Burchell (Canada) Brent Reiber
T. Greilinger (C. Braun) – 24:19 / 1–0; P. Reimer – 57:53 / 2–0			Referees: (Canada) Darcy Burchell (Canada) Brent Reiber
6 min	Penalties	4 min	Referees: (Canada) Darcy Burchell (Canada) Brent Reiber
27	Shots	31	Referees: (Canada) Darcy Burchell (Canada) Brent Reiber

29 April 2011; 20:15	Slovakia	3–1 (0–0, 1–1, 2–0)	Slovenia	Orange Arena, Bratislava; Attendance: 9,248

Game reference

Jaroslav Halák
Goalies
Robert Kristan
Referees:
(Switzerland) Danny Kurmann
(United States) Thomas Sterns

	0–1	22:37 – A. Kranjc (G. Kuznik, T. Razingar) (PP)
M. Šatan (T. Surový) – 35:16	1–1
P. Podhradský (R. Zedník, T. Surový) – 47:03	2–1
Ľ. Bartečko (ENG) – 59:52	3–1

4 min
Penalties
10 min
45
Shots
15

1 May 2011; 16:15	Russia	6–4 (1–0, 1–1, 4–3)	Slovenia	Orange Arena, Bratislava; Attendance: 9,090

Game reference

Evgeni Nabokov
Goalies
Andrej Hočevar
Referees:
(Switzerland) Danny Kurmann
(Sweden) Sören Persson

V. Atyushov (I. Kovalchuk, A. Radulov) (PP) – 04:22	1–0
	1–1	29:15 – A. Hebar (B. Gregorc)
M. Afinogenov (K. Korneyev) – 35:41	2–1
	2–2	42:49 – B. Goličič (M. Šivic, M. Hočevar)
D. Kulikov (A. Kaigorodov) – 46:15	3–2
E. Artyukhin (M. Afinogenov, A. Kaigorodov) – 46:53	4–2
	4–3	47:21 – B. Goličič (D. Rodman)
	4–4	51:28 – R. Pajič (A. Tavželj)
A. Radulov (I. Kovalchuk, K. Gorovikov) – 56:19	5–4
S. Zinovjev (D. Zaripov) – 59:22	6–4

33 min
Penalties
6 min
25
Shots
35

1 May 2011; 20:15	Slovakia	3–4 (0–0, 0–3, 3–1)	Germany	Orange Arena, Bratislava; Attendance: 9,303

Game reference

Jaroslav Halák
Goalies
Dimitri Patzold
Referees:
(Canada) Darcy Burchell
(Sweden) Christer Lärking

	0–1	24:51 – M. Müller (C. Ullmann, T. Greilinger)
	0–2	33:07 – J. Tripp (F. Schütz, F. Mauer)
	0–3	36:35 – F. Hördler (C. Ullmann, K. Holzer)
	0–4	44:37 – F. Schütz (J. Tripp, N. Goc)
L. Nagy (Ľ. Bartečko) – 45:26	1–4
J. Stümpel (L. Nagy, M. Šatan) (PP) – 47:49	2–4
P. Demitra (M. Hossa) – 52:43	3–4

10 min
Penalties
20 min
38
Shots
29

3 May 2011; 16:15	Slovenia	2–3 GWS (1–0, 1–1, 0–1) (OT: 0–0) (SO: 0–1)	Germany	Orange Arena, Bratislava; Attendance: 8,010

Game reference

Robert Kristan
Goalies
Dennis Endras
Referees:
(Slovakia) Vladimír Baluška
(Russia) Konstantin Olenin

Z. Jeglič (R. Sabolič, M. Robar) – 04:09	1–0
R. Tičar (R. Sabolič) – 28:33	2–0
	2–1	35:19 – M. Wolf (A. Rankel, K. Hospelt) (PP)
	2–2	45:32 – F. Schütz (J. Krueger, P. Gogulla)

R. Tičar (miss)
Ž. Jeglič (miss)
R. Pajič (miss)
D. Rodman
R. Sabolič (miss)
D. Rodman (miss)
M. Rodman (miss)
Ž. Jeglič (miss)
Shootout
(miss) T. Greilinger
(miss) C. Ullmann
(miss) M. Wolf
P. Reimer
(miss) P. Reimer
(miss) D. Kreutzer
(miss) M. Müller
F. Hördler
12 min
Penalties
8 min
26
Shots
61

3 May 2011; 20:15	Russia	4–3 (2–1, 1–2, 1–0)	Slovakia	Orange Arena, Bratislava; Attendance: 9,314

Game reference

Evgeni Nabokov
Konstantin Barulin
Goalies
Jaroslav Halák
Referees:
(Sweden) Christer Lärking
(Sweden) Sören Persson

A. Radulov (I. Kovalchuk, F. Tyutin) – 00:58	1–0
	1–1	01:28 – M. Šatan (L. Nagy, M. Jurčina)
I. Nikulin (I. Kovalchuk, F. Tyutin) – 18:04	2–1
	2–2	30:06 – M. Gáborík (P. Demitra)
	2–3	32:01 – L. Nagy (I. Majeský, Ľ. Višňovský)
I. Nikulin (I. Kovalchuk) (PP) – 38:10	3–3
A. Morozov (V. Atyushov, A. Kaigorodov) (PP) – 43:38	4–3

8 min
Penalties
14 min
31
Shots
32

=== Group B ===
Team	Pld	W	OTW	OTL	L	GF	GA	GD	Pts
Canada	3	2	1	0	0	17	5	+12	8
Switzerland	3	1	1	1	0	8	5	+3	6
France	3	0	1	1	1	3	11	−8	3
Belarus	3	0	0	1	2	3	10	−7	1

Source: IIHF

All times are local (UTC+2).

29 April 2011; 16:15	Switzerland	1–0 OT (0–0, 0–0, 0–0) (OT: 1–0)	France	Steel Aréna, Košice; Attendance: 2,964

Game reference
Tobias Stephan	Goalies	Cristobal Huet	Referees: (Finland) Sami Partanen (Finland) Jyri Petteri Rönn
J. Vauclair (I. Rüthemann) – 61:46 / 1–0			Referees: (Finland) Sami Partanen (Finland) Jyri Petteri Rönn
12 min	Penalties	10 min	Referees: (Finland) Sami Partanen (Finland) Jyri Petteri Rönn
35	Shots	29	Referees: (Finland) Sami Partanen (Finland) Jyri Petteri Rönn

29 April 2011; 20:15	Belarus	1–4 (1–1, 0–1, 0–2)	Canada	Steel Aréna, Košice; Attendance: 6,025

Game reference

Andrei Mezin
Goalies
James Reimer
Referees:
(Czech Republic) Antonín Jeřábek
(Czech Republic) Vladimír Šindler

	0–1	01:52 – J. Eberle (E. Kane, M. Scalzo)
A. Stepanov (A. Kulakov, A. Kitarov) – 19:26	1–1
	1–2	30:27 – J. Skinner (J. Tavares)
	1–3	45:18 – J. Tavares (J. Skinner)
	1–4	48:39 – J. Eberle (D. Phaneuf, M. Scalzo) (PP)

8 min
Penalties
14 min
22
Shots
39

1 May 2011; 16:15	Canada	9–1 (3–0, 2–1, 4–0)	France	Steel Aréna, Košice; Attendance: 4,457

Game reference

James Reimer
Devan Dubnyk
Goalies
Cristobal Huet
Fabrice Lhenry
Referees:
(Russia) Vyacheslav Bulanov
(Latvia) Eduards Odiņš

M. Gragnani (J. Spezza, D. Phaneuf) (PP) – 01:02	1–0
J. Spezza (D. Phaneuf) – 06:35	2–0
J. Skinner (J. Tavares) – 12:02	3–0
	3–1	29:14 – P. Bellemare (S. Treille, Y. Auvitu) (PP)
C. Stewart (J. Skinner, J. Tavares) – 36:06	4–1
A. Pietrangelo – 36:49	5–1
B. Burns (J. Neal, R. Nash) (PP) – 41:41	6–1
R. Nash – 44:38	7–1
J. Skinner (PS) – 54:30	8–1
T. Zajac (C. Clutterbuck, A. Pietrangelo) – 57:44	9–1

10 min
Penalties
12 min
39
Shots
33

1 May 2011; 20:15	Switzerland	4–1 (1–0, 3–1, 0–0)	Belarus	Steel Aréna, Košice; Attendance: 3,193

Game reference

Tobias Stephan
Goalies
Andrei Mezin
Referees:
(Slovakia) Peter Ország
(Germany) Daniel Piechaczek

R. Gardner (R. Diaz, S. Moser) (PP) – 07:08	1–0
	1–1	21:33 – D. Korobov (V. Kostyuchenok, A. Stepanov)
G. Bezina (I. Rüthemann, R. Gardner) – 24:11	2–1
R. Gardner (B. Gerber, I. Rüthemann) – 27:03	3–1
I. Rüthemann (A. Ambühl, F. Du Bois) (SH) – 30:51	4–1

8 min
Penalties
10 min
27
Shots
23

3 May 2011; 16:15	Canada	4–3 OT (0–1, 2–0, 1–2) (OT: 1–0)	Switzerland	Steel Aréna, Košice; Attendance: 7,214

Game reference

James Reimer
Goalies
Leonardo Genoni
Referees:
(Czech Republic) Antonín Jeřábek
(Czech Republic) Vladimír Šindler

	0–1	12:29 – R. Diaz (V. Stancescu, R. Lemm)
J. Eberle (E. Kane) – 31:57	1–1
J. Tavares – 36:51	2–1
	2–2	48:08 – F. Du Bois (L. Sbisa, R. Gardner)
C. Stewart (T. Zajac) – 56:46	3–2
	3–3	58:38 – A. Ambühl (J. Vauclair)
A. Pietrangelo (T. Zajac) – 64:14	4–3

4 min
Penalties
10 min
61
Shots
33

3 May 2011; 20:15	France	2–1 OT (1–0, 0–0, 0–1) (OT: 1–0)	Belarus	Steel Aréna, Košice; Attendance: 3,968

Game reference

Cristobal Huet
Goalies
Andrei Mezin
Referees:
(Finland) Sami Partanen
(Finland) Jyri Rönn

S. Treille (K. Hecquefeuille, L. Meunier) (PP) – 12:35	1–0
	1–1	55:32 – S. Demagin (O. Goroshko, A. Mikhalev)
K. Hecquefeuille (S. Da Costa, S. Treille) – 60:46	2–1

8 min
Penalties
8 min
35
Shots
38

=== Group C ===
Team	Pld	W	OTW	OTL	L	GF	GA	GD	Pts
Sweden	3	2	0	1	0	13	7	+6	7
United States	3	2	0	0	1	11	9	+2	6
Norway	3	1	1	0	1	12	8	+4	5
Austria	3	0	0	0	3	1	13	−12	0

Source: IIHF

All times are local (UTC+2).

30 April 2011; 16:15	United States	5–1 (2–0, 1–1, 2–0)	Austria	Steel Aréna, Košice; Attendance: 4,495

Game reference

Al Montoya
Goalies
Jürgen Penker
Referees:
(Russia) Vyacheslav Bulanov
(Latvia) Eduards Odiņš

C. Kreider (M. Fayne, D. Stepan) – 14:42	1–0
B. Wheeler (D. Stepan) – 17:15	2–0
	2–1	34:00 – M. Pewal (T. Raffl, M. Raffl)
Y. Šťastný (C. Wilson, C. Fowler) – 38:36	3–1
K. Shattenkirk (N. Palmieri, R. Shannon) – 42:47	4–1
C. Smith (J. Johnson) (PP) – 56:42	5–1

10 min
Penalties
6 min
32
Shots
13

30 April 2011; 20:15	Norway	5–4 GWS (1–3, 2–0, 1–1) (OT: 0–0) (SO: 1–0)	Sweden	Steel Aréna, Košice; Attendance: 5,147

Game reference

Lars Haugen
Goalies
Erik Ersberg
Referees:
(Slovakia) Peter Ország
(Germany) Daniel Piechaczek

	0–1	06:21 – L. Eriksson (R. Nilsson)
M. Røymark (M. Hansen, M. Ask) (PP) – 08:06	1–1
	1–2	11:41 – P. Berglund (M. Thörnberg)
	1–3	15:01 – P. Berglund (D. Petrasek, M. Pääjärvi-Svensson) (PP)
M. Ask (M. Olimb) (PP) – 21:00	2–3
M. Holtet (A. Bastiansen, P. Skrøder) (PP) – 33:45	3–3
	3–4	49:37 – L. Eriksson (R. Nilsson) (PP)
A. Bastiansen (M. Olimb, L. Spets) – 55:06	4–4

P. Skrøder
M. Olimb
Shootout
(miss) L. Eriksson
(miss) P. Berglund
18 min
Penalties
12 min
20
Shots
46

2 May 2011; 16:15	United States	4–2 (0–2, 0–0, 4–0)	Norway	Steel Aréna, Košice; Attendance: 4,149

Game reference

Al Montoya
Goalies
Lars Haugen
Referees:
(Czech Republic) Antonín Jeřábek
(Finland) Jyri Rönn

	0–1	08:09 – K. Olimb (M. Holtet)
	0–2	09:22 – A. Bastiansen (SH)
N. Palmieri (C. Kreider, R. Shannon) – 41:16	1–2
J. Skille (T. Stapleton, R. McDonagh) – 44:59	2–2
N. Palmieri (R. Shannon, K. Shattenkirk) (PP) – 53:44	3–2
C. Smith (D. Stepan, J. Johnson) (PP) – 58:34	4–2

10 min
Penalties
14 min
49
Shots
15

2 May 2011; 20:15	Sweden	3–0 (1–0, 1–0, 1–0)	Austria	Steel Aréna, Košice; Attendance: 3,704

Game reference

Viktor Fasth
Goalies
Fabian Weinhandl
Referees:
(Finland) Sami Partanen
(Czech Republic) Vladimír Šindler

N. Persson (L. Eriksson, R. Nilsson) – 19:39	1–0
N. Persson (D. Petrasek, R. Nilsson) – 25:39	2–0
M. Pääjärvi-Svensson (D. Petrasek) (PP) – 42:34	3–0

6 min
Penalties
12 min
38
Shots
23

4 May 2011; 16:15	Austria	0–5 (0–3, 0–1, 0–1)	Norway	Steel Aréna, Košice; Attendance: 4,355

Game reference

Jürgen Penker
Goalies
Lars Haugen
Referees:
(Latvia) Eduards Odiņš
(Germany) Daniel Piechaczek

0–1	06:26 – E. Koivu (A. Bastiansen, M. Olimb)
0–2	09:31 – M. Olimb (L. Spets, A. Bastiansen)
0–3	10:27 – J. Holøs (P. Skrøder, M. Olimb) (PP)
0–4	39:41 – L. Spets (A. Bastiansen, M. Olimb)
0–5	49:51 – A. Bastiansen (M. Olimb, P. Skrøder) (PP)

39 min
Penalties
8 min
25
Shots
27

4 May 2011; 20:15	Sweden	6–2 (1–1, 3–0, 2–1)	United States	Steel Aréna, Košice; Attendance: 7,401

Game reference

Viktor Fasth
Goalies
Al Montoya
Referees:
(Russia) Vyacheslav Bulanov
(Slovakia) Peter Ország

P. Berglund (T. Erixon) – 17:31	1–0
	1–1	18:43 – C. Fowler (D. Stepan, C. Smith) (PP)
M. Krüger (M. Tedenby) – 23:17	2–1
M. Sjögren (J. Ericsson) – 30:27	3–1
P. Berglund (M. Thörnberg, M. Pääjärvi-Svensson) – 35:16	4–1
	4–2	50:29 – B. Wheeler (C. Smith)
J. Ericsson (S. Kronwall, M. Sjögren) – 56:01	5–2
D. Petrasek (M. Sjögren) (PP) – 58:50	6–2

12 min
Penalties
4 min
30
Shots
32

=== Group D ===
Team	Pld	W	OTW	OTL	L	GF	GA	GD	Pts
Czech Republic	3	3	0	0	0	12	3	+9	9
Finland	3	1	1	0	1	9	5	+4	5
Denmark	3	0	1	0	2	4	13	−9	2
Latvia	3	0	0	2	1	6	10	−4	2

Source: IIHF

All times are local (UTC+2).

30 April 2011; 16:15	Finland	5–1 (0–0, 2–0, 3–1)	Denmark	Orange Arena, Bratislava; Attendance: 9,125

Game reference

Petri Vehanen
Goalies
Frederik Andersen
Referees:
(Slovakia) Vladimír Baluška
(Russia) Konstantin Olenin

J. Immonen (J. Välivaara) (PP) – 23:57	1–0
J. Aaltonen (M. Koivu) (PP) – 36:26	2–0
A. Pihlström (M. Pyörälä, P. Nokelainen) – 42:39	3–0
	3–1	47:54 – N. Hardt (J. Jakobsen, M. Green) (PP)
M. Granlund (J. Niskala, P. Puistola) (PP) – 52:29	4–1
T. Ruutu (J. Aaltonen) – 53:21	5–1

4 min
Penalties
10 min
44
Shots
9

30 April 2011; 20:15	Czech Republic	4–2 (1–1, 1–1, 2–0)	Latvia	Orange Arena, Bratislava; Attendance: 9,219

Game reference

Ondřej Pavelec
Goalies
Edgars Masaļskis
Referees:
(Sweden) Christer Lärking
(Sweden) Sören Persson

	0–1	09:04 – L. Dārziņš (M. Rēdlihs, K. Sotnieks)
T. Rolinek (J. Voráček, M. Škoula) – 17:47	1–1
	1–2	21:21 – R. Bukarts (A. Bērziņš, G. Meija)
P. Eliáš (M. Havlát, M. Michálek) – 33:02	2–2
M. Havlát (P. Eliáš) – 41:15	3–2
R. Červenka – 58:11	4–2

14 min
Penalties
20 min
34
Shots
24

2 May 2011; 16:15	Czech Republic	6–0 (1–0, 4–0, 1–0)	Denmark	Orange Arena, Bratislava; Attendance: 9,217

Game reference

Ondřej Pavelec
Goalies
Patrick Galbraith
Referees:
(Russia) Konstantin Olenin
(Switzerland) Brent Reiber

M. Frolík (P. Hubáček, Z. Michálek) – 02:29	1–0
M. Michálek (M. Židlický) – 31:34	2–0
M. Michálek (P. Eliáš, M. Havlát) (PP) – 33:17	3–0
M. Frolík (P. Čáslava, J. Novotný) – 34:25	4–0
T. Plekanec (R. Červenka) – 34:38	5–0
P. Průcha (M. Frolík) – 56:23	6–0

12 min
Penalties
4 min
35
Shots
24

2 May 2011; 20:15	Latvia	2–3 GWS (0–1, 1–0, 1–1) (OT: 0–0) (SO: 0–1)	Finland	Orange Arena, Bratislava; Attendance: 9,210

Game reference

Edgars Masaļskis
Goalies
Teemu Lassila
Referees:
(Switzerland) Danny Kurmann
(United States) Thomas Sterns

	0–1	13:54 – J. Immonen (J. Välivaara, M. Granlund) (PP)
K. Rēdlihs (M. Rēdlihs, A. Džeriņš) (PP) – 33:36	1–1
H. Vasiļjevs (M. Cipulis, G. Pujacs) (PP) – 42:12	2–1
	2–2	52:51 – N. Kapanen (J. Immonen, M. Granlund) (PP)

A. Ņiživijs (miss)
L. Dārziņš (miss)
Shootout
J. Immonen
M. Koivu
10 min
Penalties
10 min
25
Shots
34

4 May 2011; 16:15	Denmark	3–2 GWS (1–0, 1–2, 0–0) (OT: 0–0) (SO: 1–0)	Latvia	Orange Arena, Bratislava; Attendance: 8,870

Game reference

Frederik Andersen
Goalies
Edgars Masaļskis
Referees:
(Slovakia) Vladimír Baluška
(Canada) Darcy Burchell

M. Christensen (J. Jakobsen, M. Bødker) – 01:43	1–0
	1–1	23:03 – M. Cipulis (O. Cibuļskis, A. Ņiživijs)
M. Christensen (D. Nielsen, N. Hardt) (PP) – 28:27	2–1
	2–2	35:14 – J. Rēdlihs (A. Ņiživijs, M. Rēdlihs) (PP)

M. Green (miss)
M. Madsen (miss)
J. Jakobsen (miss)
M. Christensen
Shootout
(miss) A. Ņiživijs
(miss) H. Vasiļjevs
(miss) A. Džeriņš
(miss) A. Ņiživijs
12 min
Penalties
14 min
29
Shots
39

4 May 2011; 20:15	Finland	1–2 (0–0, 0–1, 1–1)	Czech Republic	Orange Arena, Bratislava; Attendance: 9,310

Game reference

Petri Vehanen
Goalies
Ondřej Pavelec
Referees:
(Switzerland) Brent Reiber
(United States) Thomas Sterns

	0–1	24:24 – M. Michálek (M. Židlický, K. Rachůnek) (PP)
	0–2	42:48 – J. Jágr (R. Červenka, L. Krajíček)
A. Salmela – 59:41	1–2

16 min
Penalties
24 min
32
Shots
25

== Qualifying round ==
The top three teams from each group of the preliminary round advanced to the qualifying round. They were placed into two groups: teams from Groups A and D were placed into Group E, while teams from Groups B and C were placed into Group F. Every team kept the points from preliminary round matches against teams who also advanced. The teams played a single round robin, but didn't play against teams that they had already met in preliminary groups.

The top four teams in both groups E and F advanced to the playoff round.

Team advanced to the Playoff Round
Team eliminated from advancing

=== Group E ===
Team	Pld	W	OTW	OTL	L	GF	GA	GD	Pts
Czech Republic	5	5	0	0	0	19	7	+12	15
Finland	5	2	2	0	1	16	10	+6	10
Germany	5	2	0	2	1	15	17	−2	8
Russia	5	2	0	1	2	12	14	−2	7
Slovakia	5	1	0	0	4	13	14	−1	3
Denmark	5	0	1	0	4	9	22	−13	2

Source: IIHF

All times are local (UTC+2).

5 May 2011; 20:15	Russia	4–3 (1–2, 2–0, 1–1)	Denmark	Orange Arena, Bratislava; Attendance: 9,204

Game reference

Evgeni Nabokov
Konstantin Barulin
Goalies
Frederik Andersen
Referees:
(Slovakia) Vladimír Baluška
(Sweden) Soeren Perrson

S.Zinoviev (I.Nikulin, D.Zaripov) – 09:26	1–0
	1–1	11:12 – N.Hardt (K.Starkov)
	1–2	19:46 – Ma. Bødker (P.Hersby) (PP)
S.Zinoviev (A.Morozov, D.Zaripov) – 30:08	2–2
S.Zinoviev (D.Zaripov, A.Morozov) – 34:18	3–2
E.Artyukhin (A.Korneyev, D.Kalinin) – 45:21	4–2
	4–3	47:27 – N.Hardt (K.Starkov)

14 min
Penalties
6 min
40
Shots
22

6 May 2011; 16:15	Germany	4–5 GWS (1–1, 3–2, 0–1) (OT: 0–0) (SO: 0–1)	Finland	Orange Arena, Bratislava; Attendance: 9,255

Game reference

Dennis Endras
Goalies
Teemu Lassila
Petri Vehanen
Referees:
(Russia) Konstantin Olenin
(Switzerland) Brent Reiber

	0–1	00:13 – T. Ruutu (M. Koivu, S. Lepistö)
A. Rankel (M. Wolf, K. Hospelt) – 14:45	1–1
F. Schütz (P. Gogulla, F. Mauer) – 26:28	2–1
K. Hospelt (K. Lavallée, N. Goc) – 27:32	3–1
	3–2	31:39 – J. Pesonen (M. Granlund, P. Puistola)
	3–3	38:07 – J. Immonen (J. Pesonen, J. Niskala)
P. Reimer (C. Braun, M. Mueller) – 39:03	4–3
	4–4	54:12 – T. Ruutu (J. Pesonen, S. Lepistö)

P. Reimer
K. Hospelt (miss)
M. Wolf
P. Reimer (miss)
Shootout
(miss) J. Immonen
M. Koivu
M. Granlund
M. Koivu
8 min
Penalties
6 min
21
Shots
50

6 May 2011; 20:15	Czech Republic	3–2 (1–0, 0–1, 2–1)	Slovakia	Orange Arena, Bratislava; Attendance: 9,313

Game reference

Ondřej Pavelec
Goalies
Jaroslav Halák
Referees:
(Canada) Darcy Burchell
(Switzerland) Danny Kurmann

M. Židlický (P. Eliáš, J. Marek) (PP) – 17:48	1–0
	1–1	22:54 – L. Nagy (Ľ Višňovský, J. Stümpel)
M. Havlát (P. Eliáš) – 41:06	2–1
M. Michálek (P. Eliáš, M. Havlát) – 44:28	3–1
	3–2	58:41 – T. Surový (B. Radivojevič, M. Cibák)

6 min
Penalties
4 min
37
Shots
22

7 May 2011; 16:15	Denmark	4–3 GWS (1–1, 1–1, 1–1) (OT: 0–0) (SO: 1–0)	Germany	Orange Arena, Bratislava; Attendance: 9,299

Game reference

Frederik Andersen
Goalies
Dennis Endras
Referees:
(Slovakia) Vladimír Baluška
(Canada) Darcy Burchell

Ma.Bødker (M. Christensen, J. Jakobsen) (PP) – 08:09	1–0
	1–1	J. Tripp (M. Müller, C. Ullmann) – 10:15
Mi. Bødker (J. Jakobsen, K. Jensen) – 21:39	2–1
	2–2	A. Barta (M. Kink, P. Reimer) – 22:05
	2–3	K. Lavallée (F. Hördler, M. Müller) – 41:32
N. Hardt (M. Green, M. Madsen) – 57:33	3–3

M. Madsen (miss)
M. Christensen
Mi. Bødker
Shootout
(miss) M. Müller
P. Reimer
(miss) M. Wolf
12 min
Penalties
8 min
22
Shots
33

7 May 2011; 20:15	Finland	2–1 (0–1, 0–0, 2–0)	Slovakia	Orange Arena, Bratislava; Attendance: 9,321

Game reference

Petri Vehanen
Goalies
Jaroslav Halák
Referees:
(Switzerland) Danny Kurmann
(Switzerland) Brent Reiber

	0–1	16:21 – M. Gáborík (M. Handzuš, P. Demitra) (PP)
T. Ruutu (M. Koivu) – 47:17	1–1
T. Ruutu (A. Salmela, M. Pyörälä) – 50:26	2–1

8 min
Penalties
6 min
35
Shots
28

8 May 2011; 16:15	Czech Republic	3–2 (2–0, 0–1, 1–1)	Russia	Orange Arena, Bratislava; Attendance: 9,308

Game reference

Ondřej Pavelec
Goalies
Konstantin Barulin
Referees:
(Switzerland) Brent Reiber
(United States) Thomas Sterns

J. Voráček (T. Rolinek, M. Škoula) – 14:01	1–0
J. Jágr (T. Plekanec) – 15:52	2–0
	2–1	31:50 – A. Tereshchenko (V. Atyushov, A. Radulov) (PP)
T. Plekanec (PS) – 43:27	3–1
	3–2	55:04 – D. Zaripov (D. Kalinin, S. Zinovjev)

8 min
Penalties
16 min
33
Shots
26

9 May 2011; 12:15	Slovakia	4–1 (2–1, 0–0, 2–0)	Denmark	Orange Arena, Bratislava; Attendance: 9,307

Game reference

Jaroslav Halák
Goalies
Patrick Galbraith
Referees:
(Russia) Konstantin Olenin
(United States) Thomas Sterns

	0–1	04:09 – M. Christensen (Mi. Bødker, J. Jakobsen)
J. Stümpel (M. Jurčina, M. Šatan) – 10:10	1–1
M. Šatan (Š Ružička, I. Majeský) – 15:52	2–1
M. Hossa (M. Gáborík, J. Halák) (PP) – 40:32	3–1
R. Zedník (M. Handzuš, D. Graňák) – 50:05	4–1

16 min
Penalties
10 min
43
Shots
18

9 May 2011; 16:15	Russia	2–3 GWS (2–0, 0–2, 0–0) (OT: 0–0) (SO: 0–1)	Finland	Orange Arena, Bratislava; Attendance: 9,292

Game reference

Konstantin Barulin
Goalies
Petri Vehanen
Teemu Lassila
Referees:
(Switzerland) Danny Kurmann
(Sweden) Christer Lärking

N. Kulemin (D. Kulikov, E.Artyukhin) – 04:26	1–0
I. Nikulin (D. Zaripov, A. Morozov) – 04:37	2–0
	2–1	26:59 – M. Koivu (P. Puistola, M. Pyörälä)
	2–2	36:39 – J. Niskala (J. Immonen)

I. Kovalchuk (miss)
A. Morozov (miss)
Shootout
J. Immonen
M. Koivu
12 min
Penalties
12 min
35
Shots
32

9 May 2011; 20:15	Germany	2–5 (1–2, 0–3, 1–0)	Czech Republic	Orange Arena, Bratislava; Attendance: 9,305

Game reference

Dennis Endras
Goalies
Jakub Štěpanek
Referees:
(Slovakia) Vladimír Baluška
(Sweden) Sören Persson

	0–1	00:51 – T. Plekanec (J. Jágr)
J. Tripp (K. Lavallée, F. Hördler) – 01:49	1–1
	1–2	10:38 – M. Frolík (J. Novotný, P. Hubáček)
	1–3	22:47 – K. Rachůnek (J. Jágr, R. Červenka) (PP)
	1–4	35:34 – T. Plekanec (J. Jágr, R. Červenka) (PP)
	1–5	36:58 – P. Eliáš (P. Průcha, M. Havlát)
T. Greilinger (PP) – 58:26	2–5

10 min
Penalties
8 min
42
Shots
22

=== Group F ===
Team	Pld	W	OTW	OTL	L	GF	GA	GD	Pts
Canada	5	3	2	0	0	23	11	+12	13
Sweden	5	3	0	1	1	18	10	+8	10
Norway	5	2	1	0	2	17	15	+2	8
United States	5	2	0	1	2	15	19	−4	7
Switzerland	5	1	1	1	2	11	12	−1	6
France	5	0	0	1	4	5	22	−17	1

Source: IIHF

All times are local (UTC+2).

5 May 2011; 20:15	Switzerland	2–3 (0–2, 1–0, 1–1)	Norway	Steel Aréna, Košice; Attendance: 2,820

Game reference

Tobias Stephan
Goalies
Lars Haugen
Referees:
(Latvia) Eduards Odiņš
(Slovakia) Peter Ország

	0–1	08:47 – J. Holøs (A. Bonsaksen, M. Olimb)
	0–2	19:55 – P. Skrøder (J. Holøs, M. Olimb) (PP)
T. Monnet (J. Sprunger, M. Seger) (PP) – 28:35	1–2
	1–3	42:48 – K. Forsberg (M. Holtet)
R. Diaz (I. Rüthemann) (PP) – 47:19	2–3

8 min
Penalties
14 min
41
Shots
25

6 May 2011; 16:15	Canada	4–3 GWS (0–0, 1–2, 2–1) (OT: 0–0) (SO: 1–0)	United States	Steel Aréna, Košice; Attendance: 7,485

Game reference

James Reimer
Goalies
Ty Conklin
Referees:
(Finland) Sami Partanen
(Germany) Daniel Piechaczek

	0–1	24:13 – M. Komisarek (C. Smith, T. Conklin)
B. Burns (A. Pietrangelo) – 27:20	1–1
	1–2	33:47 – J. Johnson (B. Wheeler, Y. Šťastný)
J. Tavares (C. Stewart, M. Gragnani) – 43:27	2–2
J. Spezza (J. Tavares, B. Burns) (PP) – 45:22	3–2
	3–3	51:17 – D. Stepan (B. Wheeler) (PP)

J. Eberle
R. Nash
Shootout
(miss) J. Johnson
(miss) B. Wheeler
8 min
Penalties
14 min
52
Shots
20

6 May 2011; 20:15	Sweden	4–0 (3–0, 0–0, 1–0)	France	Steel Aréna, Košice; Attendance: 4,761

Game reference

Viktor Fasth
Goalies
Cristobal Huet
Fabrice Lhenry
Referees:
(Finland) Jyri Rönn
(Czech Republic) Vladimír Šindler

R. Nilsson (D. Fernholm, T. Erixon) – 04:34	1–0
O. Ekman-Larsson (S. Kronwall) (PP) – 13:51	2–0
P. Berglund (M. Pääjärvi-Svensson, C. Gunnarsson) – 15:39	3–0
S. Kronwall (O. Ekman-Larsson, M. Backlund) – 45:34	4–0

10 min
Penalties
22 min
58
Shots
29

7 May 2011; 16:15	Norway	2–3 (0–1, 0–1, 2–1)	Canada	Steel Aréna, Košice; Attendance: 4,978

Game reference

Lars Haugen
Goalies
Jonathan Bernier
Referees:
(Finland) Jyri Rönn
(Czech Republic) Vladimír Šindler

	0–1	J. Spezza (R. Nash, J. Neal) – 15:26
	0–2	J. Tavares – 30:15
	0–3	J. Neal (R. Nash, J. Spezza) – 49:02
K. Olimb (M. Røymark) – 51:36	1–3
M. Holtet (O. Tollefsen) – 52:49	2–3

6 min
Penalties
14 min
27
Shots
43

7 May 2011; 20:15	United States	3–2 (1–1, 2–0, 0–1)	France	Steel Aréna, Košice; Attendance: 3,101

Game reference

Ty Conklin
Goalies
Cristobal Huet
Referees:
(Latvia) Eduards Odiņš
(Slovakia) Peter Ország

	0–1	05:25 – S. Treille
D. Stepan (B. Wheeler) – 16:06	1–1
M. Stuart (C. Porter, P. Gaustad) – 21:16	2–1
C. Kreider (A. Miele) (PP) – 25:24	3–1
	3–2	55:30 – L. Meunier (K. Hecquefeuille)

20 min
Penalties
22 min
38
Shots
22

8 May 2011; 16:15	Sweden	2–0 (0–0, 0–0, 2–0)	Switzerland	Steel Aréna, Košice; Attendance: 5,941

Game reference
Viktor Fasth	Goalies	Leonardo Genoni	Referees: (Russia) Vyacheslav Bulanov (Latvia) Eduards Odiņš
M. Backlund (S. Kronwall) – 47:47 / 1–0; M. Backlund (ENG) – 59:28 / 2–0			Referees: (Russia) Vyacheslav Bulanov (Latvia) Eduards Odiņš
10 min	Penalties	14 min	Referees: (Russia) Vyacheslav Bulanov (Latvia) Eduards Odiņš
34	Shots	31	Referees: (Russia) Vyacheslav Bulanov (Latvia) Eduards Odiņš

9 May 2011; 12:15	France	2–5 (1–3, 1–1, 0–1)	Norway	Steel Aréna, Košice; Attendance: 3,178

Game reference

Cristobal Huet
Goalies
Lars Haugen
Referees:
(Russia) Vyacheslav Bulanov
(Czech Republic) Antonín Jeřábek

	0–1	03:26 – P. Skrøder (M. Røymark, M. Ask) (PP)
	0–2	03:52 – M. Holtet (K. Olimb, J. Holøs)
D. Fleury (D. Raux, J. Desrosiers) – 10:57	1–2
	1–3	17:50 – M. Holtet
L. Meunier (K. Hecquefeuille, P. Bellemare) (SH) – 31:20	2–3
	2–4	35:19 – M. Holtet (P. Skrøder, J. Holøs) (PP)
	2–5	52:26 – M. Holtet (A. Bonsaksen)

32 min
Penalties
8 min
19
Shots
37

9 May 2011; 16:15	Switzerland	5–3 (2–1, 2–1, 1–1)	United States	Steel Aréna, Košice; Attendance: 4,939

Game reference

Tobias Stephan
Goalies
Ty Conklin
Al Montoya
Referees:
(Finland) Jyri Rönn
(Czech Republic) Vladimír Šindler

	0–1	11:01 – C. Smith (C. Wilson, K. Shattenkirk)
K. Lotscher (M. Trachsler, S. Moser) – 11:35	1–1
R. Diaz (M. Plüss, I. Rüthemann) – 14:10	2–1
I. Rüthemann (M. Bieber, M. Plüss) – 21:06	3–1
	3–2	26:09 – R. Shannon (A. Miele)
K. Lotscher – 31:00	4–2
	4–3	58:17 – J. van Riemsdyk (C. Fowler, D. Stepan)
R. Gardner (M. Plüss, M. Trachsler) (ENG) – 59:43	5–3

6 min
Penalties
4 min
29
Shots
34

9 May 2011; 20:15	Canada	3–2 (2–1, 0–1, 1–0)	Sweden	Steel Aréna, Košice; Attendance: 7,633

Game reference

Jonathan Bernier
Goalies
Erik Ersberg
Referees:
(Finland) Sami Partanen
(Germany) Daniel Piechaczek

J. Neal (J. Spezza) – 01:08	1–0
	1–1	03:43 – D. Petrasek (C. Gunnarsson, M. Pääjärvi-Svensson) (PP)
J. Tavares (J. Skinner, C. Stewart) – 13:20	2–1
	2–2	30:38 – M. Tedenby (J. Silfverberg, M. Krüger) (PP)
R. Nash (B. Burns, J. Neal) (PP) – 52:31	3–2

14 min
Penalties
16 min
43
Shots
25

== Relegation round ==
The bottom team in the standings from each group of the preliminary round plays in the relegation round. The bottom two teams in the relegation round move down to Division 1 for the 2012 World Championship.

Team qualified for the 2012 IIHF World Championship
Team relegated to Division I

=== Group G ===
Team	Pld	W	OTW	OTL	L	GF	GA	GD	Pts
Latvia	3	2	0	0	1	12	9	+3	6
Belarus	3	2	0	0	1	17	9	+8	6
Austria	3	1	0	0	2	6	13	−7	3
Slovenia	3	1	0	0	2	8	12	−4	3

Source: IIHF

All times are local (UTC+2).

5 May 2011; 16:15	Slovenia	5–2 (0–0, 3–0, 2–2)	Latvia	Orange Arena, Bratislava; Attendance: 7,467

Game reference

Robert Kristan
Goalies
Edgars Masaļskis
Martins Raitums
Referees:
(Sweden) Christer Lärking
(United States) Thomas Sterns

R. Tičar (Z. Jeglič, M. Robar) (PP) – 27:59	1–0
T. Razingar (M. Rodman, D. Rodman) – 33:55	2–0
T. Razingar (M. Rodman, D. Rodman) – 39:11	3–0
R. Tičar (R. Sabolič) – 40:54	4–0
R. Pajič (B. Goličič) – 41:27	5–0
	5–1	51:33 – M. Cipulis (J. Rēdlihs, J. Andersons)
	5–2	59:59 – R. Bukarts (K. Sotnieks, G. Meija)

12 min
Penalties
37 min
35
Shots
31

5 May 2011; 16:15	Belarus	7–2 (3–0, 2–0, 2–2)	Austria	Steel Aréna, Košice; Attendance: 4,483

Game reference

Andrei Mezin
Goalies
Jürgen Penker
Fabian Weinhandl
Referees:
(Russia) Vyacheslav Bulanov
(Czech Republic) Antonín Jeřábek

E. Kovyrshin (A. Kostitsyn, A. Kulakov) – 04:06	1–0
M. Grabovski (D. Meleshko, N. Stasenko) – 17:17	2–0
A. Kostitsyn (A. Kulakov, E. Kovyrshin) – 18:57	3–0
A. Demkov – 30:17	4–0
S. Demagin (SH) – 32:49	5–0
	5–1	40:47 – O. Setzinger (D. Werenka, T. Koch) (PP)
D. Korobov (A. Kostitsyn, A. Stepanov) (PP2) – 42:53	6–1
A. Kulakov (E. Kovyrshin) – 51:55	7–1
	7–2	53:29 – M. Schiechl (T. Hundertpfund)

12 min
Penalties
18 min
30
Shots
21

7 May 2011; 12:15	Austria	3–2 (1–0, 1–2, 1–0)	Slovenia	Orange Arena, Bratislava; Attendance: 9,033

Game reference

Fabian Weinhandl
Goalies
Robert Kristan
Referees:
(Sweden) Christer Lärking
(Russia) Konstantin Olenin

G. Unterluggauer (T. Raffl, T. Koch) – 19:03	1–0
T. Raffl (M. Peintner, M. Trattnig) – 24:15	2–0
	2–1	36:30 – T. Razingar (D. Rodman, M. Rodman)
	2–2	39:41 – D. Rodman (B. Gregorc, R. Kristan)
R. Rotter (P. Lukas) – 45:52	3–2

10 min
Penalties
14 min
37
Shots
33

7 May 2011; 12:15	Belarus	3–6 (1–3, 1–1, 1–2)	Latvia	Steel Aréna, Košice; Attendance: 4,976

Game reference

Andrei Mezin
Goalies
Edgars Masaļskis
Referees:
(Finland) Sami Partanen
(Germany) Daniel Piechaczek

	0–1	M. Cipulis (A. Reķis, A. Ņiživijs) – 09:26
	0–2	G. Pujacs (A. Džeriņš, J. Rēdlihs) – 13:23
	0–3	G. Pujacs (M. Rēdlihs) – 17:19
V. Kostyuchenok (A. Kitarov, A. Demkov) – 19:31	1–3
M. Grabovski (D. Korobov D. Meleshko) – 20:53	2–3
	2–4	A. Ņiživijs (M. Cipulis, H. Vasiļjevs) – 36:17
	2–5	M. Cipulis (A. Ņiživijs, A. Reķis) – 49:44
	2–6	K. Saulietis (M. Rēdlihs, A. Džeriņš) – 57:29
D. Meleshko (A. Kostitsyn, A. Kulakov) – 59:50	3–6

16 min
Penalties
16 min
39
Shots
31

8 May 2011; 20:15	Slovenia	1–7 (0–2, 1–3, 0–2)	Belarus	Orange Arena, Bratislava; Attendance: 8,708

Game reference

Robert Kristan
Andrej Hočevar
Goalies
Andrei Mezin
Referees:
(Canada) Darcy Burchell
(Sweden) Sören Persson

	0–1	06:02 – S. Demagin (M. Grabovski, D. Meleshko)
	0–2	07:23 – A. Kostitsyn (E. Kovyrshin, A. Kulakov)
	0–3	28:21 – A. Stepanov (A. Kitarov, A. Kostitsyn) (PP2)
31:51 – R. Sabolič (R. Pajič, Ž Jeglič)	1–3
	1–4	35:52 – A. Mikhalev (A. Ugarov, V. Denisov)
	1–5	37:13 – A. Kostitsyn (A. Stepanov, A. Demkov) (PP)
	1–6	55:07 – A. Mikhalev (D. Korobov) (SH)
	1–7	56:13 – A. Mikhalev (M. Grabovski, D. Korobov) (PP)

14 min
Penalties
6 min
24
Shots
39

8 May 2011; 20:15	Latvia	4–1 (2–0, 1–0, 1–1)	Austria	Steel Aréna, Košice; Attendance: 4,110

Game reference

Edgars Masaļskis
Goalies
Fabian Weinhandl
Referees:
(Czech Republic) Antonín Jeřábek
(Slovakia) Peter Ország

R. Bukarts (G. Meija) – 05:01	1–0
M. Rēdlihs (K. Saulietis, A. Bērziņš) – 13:30	2–0
K. Saulietis (A. Džeriņš, K. Sotnieks) (PP) – 22:57	3–0
K. Saulietis (K. Sotnieks, A. Džeriņš) (PP) – 48:47	4–0
	4–1	59:01 – T. Raffl (R. Lukas, R. Rotter) (PP)

14 min
Penalties
10 min
39
Shots
41

== Playoff round ==
Quarterfinals
E1	Czech Republic	4
F4	United States	0
F2	Sweden	5
E3	Germany	2
F1	Canada	1
E4	Russia	2
E2	Finland	4
F3	Norway	1

Semifinals
QF1	Czech Republic	2
QF2	Sweden	5
QF3	Russia	0
QF4	Finland	3

Finals
SF1	Sweden	1
SF2	Finland	6
Bronze medal game
SF1	Czech Republic	7
SF2	Russia	4

=== Quarterfinals ===
All times are local (UTC+2).

11 May 2011; 16:15	Czech Republic	4–0 (1–0, 1–0, 2–0)	United States	Orange Arena, Bratislava; Attendance: 9,311

Game reference

Ondřej Pavelec
Goalies
Ty Conklin
Referees:
(Canada) Darcy Burchell
(Switzerland) Brent Reiber

J. Jágr (R. Červenka) – 18:45	1–0
J. Jágr (T. Plekanec, K. Rachůnek) (PP2) – 24:47	2–0
T. Plekanec (M. Frolík, M. Židlický) – 50:33	3–0
J. Jágr (T. Plekanec) (PP) – 56:25	4–0

6 min
Penalties
10 min
39
Shots
29

11 May 2011; 20:15	Sweden	5–2 (2–1, 2–1, 1–0)	Germany	Orange Arena, Bratislava; Attendance: 8,986

Game reference

Viktor Fasth
Goalies
Dennis Endras
Referees:
(Finland) Jyri Rönn
(Czech Republic) Vladimír Šindler

M. Thörnberg (P. Berglund) – 00:27	1–0
	1–1	02:01 – A. Barta (F. Mauer, M. Kink)
P. Berglund (M. Thörnberg, V. Fasth) – 15:46	2–1
N. Persson (R. Nilsson, O. Ekman-Larsson) – 24:30	3–1
L. Eriksson (D. Rundblad, R. Nilsson) – 28:10	4–1
	4–2	38:44 – M. Wolf (A. Rankel, K. Holzer)
M. Thörnberg (P. Berglund, M. Pääjärvi-Svensson) – 48:54	5–2

8 min
Penalties
14 min
46
Shots
37

12 May 2011; 16:15	Finland	4–1 (0–0, 4–1, 0–0)	Norway	Orange Arena, Bratislava; Attendance: 8,947

Game reference

Petri Vehanen
Goalies
Lars Haugen
Referees:
(Sweden) Sören Persson
(Germany) Daniel Piechaczek

	0–1	23:56 – K. Olimb (PS)
J. Immonen (M. Granlund, J. Niskala) (PP) – 26:01	1–1
T. Ruutu (M. Koivu, J. Pesonen) (PP) – 28:43	2–1
J. Immonen (M. Granlund, J. Välivaara) (PP) – 35:38	3–1
J. Lajunen (L. Komarov, T. Jaakola) – 38:29	4–1

14 min
Penalties
18 min
34
Shots
38

12 May 2011; 20:15	Canada	1–2 (0–0, 1–0, 0–2)	Russia	Orange Arena, Bratislava; Attendance: 9,300

Game reference

Jonathan Bernier
Goalies
Konstantin Barulin
Referees:
(Switzerland) Danny Kurmann
(Sweden) Christer Lärking

J. Spezza (A. Pietrangelo) – 25:32	1–0
	1–1	49:07 – A. Kaigorodov (SH)
	1–2	52:19 – I. Kovalchuk (A. Radulov, D. Kalinin)

12 min
Penalties
10 min
37
Shots
20

=== Semifinals ===
All times are local (UTC+2).

13 May; 16:15	Czech Republic	2–5 (0–0, 1–2, 1–3)	Sweden	Orange Arena, Bratislava; Attendance: 9,285

Game reference

Ondřej Pavelec
Goalies
Viktor Fasth
Referees:
(Canada) Darcy Burchell
(Switzerland) Brent Reiber

P. Eliáš (M. Michálek, M. Židlický) – 20:46	1–0
	1–1	24:34 – P. Berglund (O. Ekman-Larsson) (PP)
	1–2	35:10 – M. Backlund (M. Sjögren)
	1–3	48:07 – J. Ericsson (M. Backlund)
	1–4	52:29 – M. Krüger (M. Tedenby)
P. Eliáš (J. Voráček) – 54:22	2–4
	2–5	59:13 – P. Berglund (D. Petrasek) (ENG)

6 min
Penalties
2 min
37
Shots
48

13 May; 20:15	Finland	3–0 (0–0, 1–0, 2–0)	Russia	Orange Arena, Bratislava; Attendance: 9,272

Game reference

Petri Vehanen
Goalies
Konstantin Barulin
Referees:
(Sweden) Christer Lärking
(Slovakia) Peter Ország

M. Granlund (J. Immonen) – 25:13	1–0
J. Lajunen – 47:40	2–0
J. Immonen (M. Granlund) – 49:15 (PP)	3–0

10 min
Penalties
12 min
29
Shots
30

=== Bronze medal game ===
Time is local (UTC+2).

15 May; 16:00	Czech Republic	7–4 (2–3, 3–1, 2–0)	Russia	Orange Arena, Bratislava; Attendance: 9,283

Game reference

Ondřej Pavelec
Goalies
Konstantin Barulin
Referees:
(Switzerland) Danny Kurmann
(Sweden) Christer Lärking

R. Červenka – 03:33	1–0
	1–1	09:25 – I. Kovalchuk (A. Radulov, F. Tyutin)
	1–2	09:40 – D. Kulikov (M. Afinogenov, K. Gorovikov)
P. Průcha (T. Rolinek, J. Marek) – 10:22	2–2
	2–3	18:53 – I. Kovalchuk (A. Radulov, S. Zinovjev)
P. Průcha – 22:11	3–3
R. Červenka (P. Průcha) – 30:45	4–3
R. Červenka (T. Plekanec) – 35:10	5–3
	5–4	36:03 – V. Tarasenko (S. Zinovjev, K. Korneyev)
J. Marek – 46:30	6–4
T. Plekanec (J. Jágr, R. Červenka) (ENG) – 58:16	7–4

4 min
Penalties
6 min
28
Shots
43

=== Gold medal game ===
Time is local (UTC+2).

15 May; 20:30	Sweden	1–6 (0–0, 1–1, 0–5)	Finland	Orange Arena, Bratislava; Attendance: 9,166

Game reference

Viktor Fasth
Goalies
Petri Vehanen
Referees:
(Canada) Darcy Burchell
(Switzerland) Brent Reiber

M. Pääjärvi-Svensson – 27:40	1–0
	1–1	J. Immonen (J. Pesonen, M. Koivu) (PP) – 39:53
	1–2	P. Nokelainen (A. Pihlström) – 42:35
	1–3	N. Kapanen (J. Aaltonen, L. Komarov) – 43:21
	1–4	J. Pesonen (M. Granlund) – 56:41
	1–5	M. Pyörälä (M. Koivu, A. Salmela) – 57:16
	1–6	A. Pihlström (J. Lajunen) – 59:05

8 min
Penalties
4 min
33
Shots
32

== Ranking and statistics ==
2011 IIHF World Championship winners

Finland
2nd title

=== Tournament awards ===
- Best players selected by the directorate:
  - Best Goaltender: (Sweden) Viktor Fasth
  - Best Defenceman: (Canada) Alex Pietrangelo
  - Best Forward: (Czech Republic) Jaromír Jágr
  - Most Valuable Player: (Sweden) Viktor Fasth
- Media All-Star Team:
  - Goaltender: (Sweden) Viktor Fasth
  - Defence: (Sweden) David Petrasek, (Czech Republic) Marek Židlický
  - Forwards: (Sweden) Patrik Berglund, (Finland) Jarkko Immonen, (Czech Republic) Jaromír Jágr,

=== Final standings ===
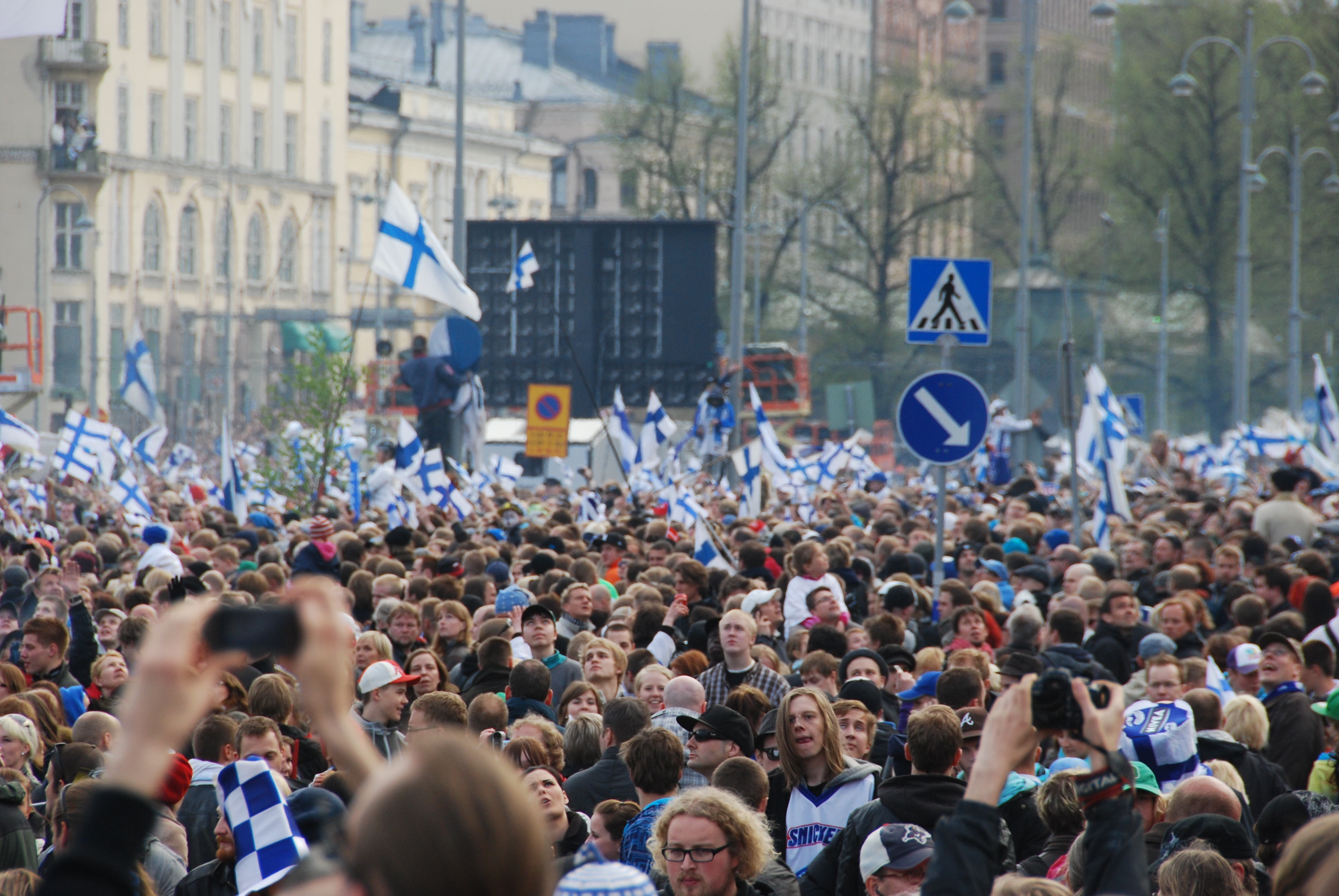
Ice hockey championship celebration in Helsinki, Finland

The final standings of the tournament according to IIHF:

1st place, gold medalist(s)	Finland
2nd place, silver medalist(s)	Sweden
3rd place, bronze medalist(s)	Czech Republic
4	Russia
5	Canada
6	Norway
7	Germany
8	United States
9	Switzerland
10	Slovakia
11	Denmark
12	France
13	Latvia
14	Belarus
15	Austria
16	Slovenia

=== Scoring leaders ===
List shows the top skaters sorted by points, then goals. If the list exceeds 10 skaters because of a tie in points, all of the tied skaters are shown.

Player	GP	G	A	Pts	+/−	PIM	POS
(Finland) Jarkko Immonen	9	9	3	12	+2	2	FW
(Sweden) Patrik Berglund	9	8	2	10	+6	8	FW
(Czech Republic) Tomáš Plekanec	8	6	4	10	+3	6	FW
(Czech Republic) Roman Červenka	9	4	6	10	+7	4	FW
(Canada) John Tavares	7	5	4	9	+6	12	FW
(Czech Republic) Jaromír Jágr	9	5	4	9	+5	4	FW
(Czech Republic) Patrik Eliáš	9	4	5	9	+4	6	FW
(Finland) Mikael Granlund	9	2	7	9	+3	2	FW
(Norway) Mathis Olimb	7	1	8	9	0	4	FW
(Norway) Marius Holtet	7	6	2	8	+6	4	FW

GP = Games played; G = Goals; A = Assists; Pts = Points; +/− = Plus/minus; PIM = Penalties in minutes; POS = Position
Source: IIHF.com

=== Leading goaltenders ===
Only the top five goaltenders, based on save percentage, who have played 40% of their team's minutes, are included in this list.

Player	TOI	SA	GA	GAA	Sv%	SO
(Finland) Petri Vehanen	388:13	175	8	1.24	95.43	1
(Sweden) Viktor Fasth	420:00	221	12	1.71	94.57	3
(Czech Republic) Ondřej Pavelec	479:16	247	15	1.88	93.93	2
(Switzerland) Tobias Stephan	240:48	111	7	1.74	93.69	0
(Norway) Lars Haugen	422:18	257	19	2.70	92.61	1

TOI = Time On Ice (minutes:seconds); SA = Shots against; GA = Goals against; GAA = Goals against average; Sv% = Save percentage; SO = Shutouts
Source: IIHF.com

== Officials ==
The IIHF selected 16 referees and 16 linesmen to work the 2011 IIHF World Championship. They are the following:

Referees

- (Slovakia) Vladimír Baluška
- (Russia) Vyacheslav Bulanov
- (Canada) Darcy Burchell
- (Czech Republic) Antonín Jeřábek
- (Switzerland) Danny Kurmann
- (Sweden) Christer Lärking
- (Latvia) Eduards Odiņš
- (Russia) Konstantin Olenin

Referees

- (Slovakia) Peter Ország
- (Finland) Sami Partanen
- (Sweden) Sören Persson
- (Germany) Daniel Piechaczek
- (Switzerland) Brent Reiber
- (Finland) Jyri Rönn
- (Czech Republic) Vladimír Šindler
- (United States) Thomas Sterns

Linesmen

- (Switzerland) Roger Arm
- (Canada) Chris Carlson
- (United States) Paul Carnathan
- (Belarus) Ivan Dedioulia
- (Czech Republic) Jiří Gebauer
- (Austria) Manuel Hollenstein
- (Slovenia) Matjaž Hribar
- (Canada) Kiel Murchison

Linesmen

- (Slovakia) Milan Novák
- (Germany) Andre Schrader
- (Germany) Sirko Schulz
- (Estonia) Anton Semionov
- (Russia) Sergei Shelyanin
- (Finland) Jussi Terho
- (Sweden) Christian Tillerkvist
- (Slovakia) Miroslav Valach

== IIHF broadcasting rights ==
Country	Broadcaster	HD (High Definition)
Austria	ORF	
Belarus	BTRC	
Bulgaria	Nova Sport	
Canada	TSN	TSN HD
Canada	RDS	RDS HD
Croatia	Sportska televizija	
Czech Republic	Czech Television	ČT HD
Denmark	TV2 Sport	TV2 Sport HD
Finland	YLE	Viasat Sport HD
France	Sport+	
Germany	Sport1	Sport1 HD
Hungary	Sport 1	
Hungary	Sport 2	
Latvia	TV3	
Latvia	TV6	
Latvia	Viasat Sport Baltic	
Latvia	3+	
Norway	Viasat 4	
Norway	Viasat Sport	Viasat Sport HD
Poland	Polsat Sport	Polsat Sport HD
Russia	C1R	
Russia	Russia 2	
Russia		Sport 1
Slovakia	STV	STV HD
Slovenia	Šport TV	
Sweden	TV3	TV3 HD
Sweden	TV6	
Sweden	TV10	
Sweden	Viasat Hockey	
Switzerland	SRG SSR	
United States	Versus	Versus HD

=== Trailer ===
A trailer titled Slovak Republic becomes the Hockey Republic! (Slovak: Slovenská republika sa mení na hokejovú republiku!) was created for the World Championships. The trailer starts with ice and snow gradually covering Slovakia and ends with Slovak hockey players jumping onto the ice and shooting a puck. The player who shoots has the number 38 on his hockey jersey, the same as the Slovak legend Pavol Demitra. It features the Slovak countryside, and Trojične square, in Trnava. The trailer took a 70-man film crew, more than 100 extras, several 3D animators, and the support of the Slovak Tourist Board.

=== Online ===
For the first time in an IIHF World Championship, a YouTube channel was created to promote the Slovakia 2011 tournament. A video campaign was launched on this YouTube website which featured the christening of the mascot Goooly, updates on the construction work of the arena's, and the status of general preparations.

An official Facebook page was also created for the championship, being only the second tournament to do so, after the previous championship in Germany. Its 10,000th "fan" was awarded a prize by the tournaments organizing committee.

== IIHF honors and awards ==
The 2011 IIHF Hall of Fame induction ceremony has held in Bratislava during the World Championships. Yuri Korolev of Russia was given the Paul Loicq Award for outstanding contributions to international ice hockey.

IIHF Hall of Fame inductees

- Karyn Bye, United States
- Tord Lundström, Sweden
- Bohumil Modrý, Czech Republic
- Kalevi Numminen, Finland
- Ladislav Troják, Slovakia
- Doru Tureanu, Romania

== See also ==
- 2011 World Junior Ice Hockey Championships
- 2011 Women's World Ice Hockey Championships
- 2011 IIHF World U18 Championships
- 2011 IIHF World Women's U18 Championship
