= Weinhandl =

Weinhandl is a surname. Notable people with the surname include:

- Fabian Weinhandl (born 1987), Austrian ice hockey player
- Mattias Weinhandl (born 1980), Swedish ice hockey player
