= Kevin Lavallee =

Kevin Lavallee is the name of:

- Kevin LaVallee (born 1961), retired Canadian ice hockey forward
- Kevin Lavallée (ice hockey, born 1981), Canadian-born German ice hockey defenceman
