= Sergei Demagin =

Belarusian ice hockey player

- Born: July 19, 1986 (age 38); Minsk, Byelorussian SSR, URS
- Height: 6 ft 0 in (183 cm)
- Weight: 185 lb (84 kg; 13 st 3 lb)
- Position: Left wing
- Shoots: Left
- KHL team Former teams: Free Agent; Dinamo Minsk; Neftekhimik Nizhnekamsk; Yugra Khanty-Mansiysk; Avtomobilist Yekaterinburg; Torpedo Nizhny Novgorod; Severstal Cherepovets; HC Lada Togliatti
- National team: Belarus
- Playing career: 2004–present

Sergei Alexandrovich Demagin (Russian: Серге́й Александрович Демагин) (born July 19, 1986) is a former Belarusian professional ice hockey forward. He most recently played with Arlan Kokshetau of the Kazakhstan Hockey Championship.

== Playing career ==
During the 2005–06 season he led the Belarus second-league with 61 points in 39 games. In 2008 he signed a contract with the Hartford Wolf Pack of the American Hockey League but never appeared with the team.

Demagin was selected for the Belarus national men's ice hockey team in the 2010 Winter Olympics. He also participated at the 2010 IIHF World Championship as a member of the Belarus National men's ice hockey team. He previously represented Belarus at the 2006 World Junior Ice Hockey Championships and the 2007 IIHF World Championship.

== Career statistics ==
=== Regular season and playoffs ===
			Regular season					Playoffs
Season	Team	League	GP	G	A	Pts	PIM	GP	G	A	Pts	PIM
2003–04	Dinamo–2 Minsk	BLR.2	36	14	19	33	33	—	—	—	—	—
2004–05	Dinamo Minsk	BLR	2	0	0	0	0	—	—	—	—	—
2004–05	Dinamo–2 Minsk	BLR.2	36	27	26	53	42	—	—	—	—	—
2005–06	Dinamo Minsk	BLR	17	0	1	1	4	—	—	—	—	—
2005–06	Dinamo–2 Minsk	BLR.2	39	29	32	61	59	—	—	—	—	—
2006–07	Dinamo Minsk	BLR	49	2	6	8	12	9	1	1	2	2
2006–07	Dinamo–2 Minsk	BLR.2	16	14	18	32	22	—	—	—	—	—
2007–08	Dinamo Minsk	BLR	46	17	15	32	26	6	2	2	4	6
2008–09	Dinamo Minsk	KHL	34	10	12	22	10	—	—	—	—	—
2009–10	Dinamo Minsk	KHL	7	0	1	1	2	—	—	—	—	—
2009–10	Neftekhimik Nizhnekamsk	KHL	44	16	10	26	16	9	1	1	2	2
2010–11	Dinamo Minsk	KHL	48	17	7	24	12	6	0	0	0	0
2011–12	Neftekhimik Nizhnekamsk	KHL	16	2	0	2	2	—	—	—	—	—
2011–12	Dizel Penza	VHL	2	1	0	1	2	—	—	—	—	—
2011–12	HC Yugra	KHL	29	9	5	14	6	5	5	2	7	0
2012–13	HC Yugra	KHL	39	10	10	20	6	—	—	—	—	—
2013–14	Neftekhimik Nizhnekamsk	KHL	9	0	1	1	6	—	—	—	—	—
2013–14	Avtomobilist Yekaterinburg	KHL	32	9	5	14	8	3	0	1	1	0
2014–15	Torpedo Nizhny Novgorod	KHL	24	1	3	4	0	—	—	—	—	—
2015–16	Severstal Cherepovets	KHL	16	1	1	2	6	—	—	—	—	—
2016–17	Lada Togliatti	KHL	32	1	2	3	10	—	—	—	—	—
2016–17	Dizel Penza	VHL	3	2	1	3	0	—	—	—	—	—
2018–19	HK Almaty	KAZ	31	12	13	25	18	—	—	—	—	—
2018–19	Arlan Kokshetau	KAZ	6	1	2	3	0	11	6	1	7	0
2019–20	HK Almaty	KAZ	40	15	13	28	12	—	—	—	—	—
2020–21	Arlan Kokshetau	KAZ	32	12	8	20	12	10	1	2	3	29
2021–22	Yunost Minsk	BLR	34	8	7	15	0	7	2	3	5	4
BLR totals			148	27	29	56	42	22	5	6	11	12
KHL totals			330	76	57	133	84	23	6	4	10	2

=== International ===
Year	Team	Event	GP	G	A	Pts	PIM
2006	Belarus	WJC D1	5	2	1	3	2
2007	Belarus	WC	3	0	0	0	2
2009	Belarus	WC	7	1	1	2	4
2010	Belarus	OG	4	0	1	1	2
2010	Belarus	WC	6	2	0	2	0
2011	Belarus	WC	6	3	0	3	4
2013	Belarus	OGQ	3	0	0	0	2
2015	Belarus	WC	4	0	0	0	0
Senior totals			33	6	2	8	14
