= Rok Pajič =

Slovenian professional ice hockey center

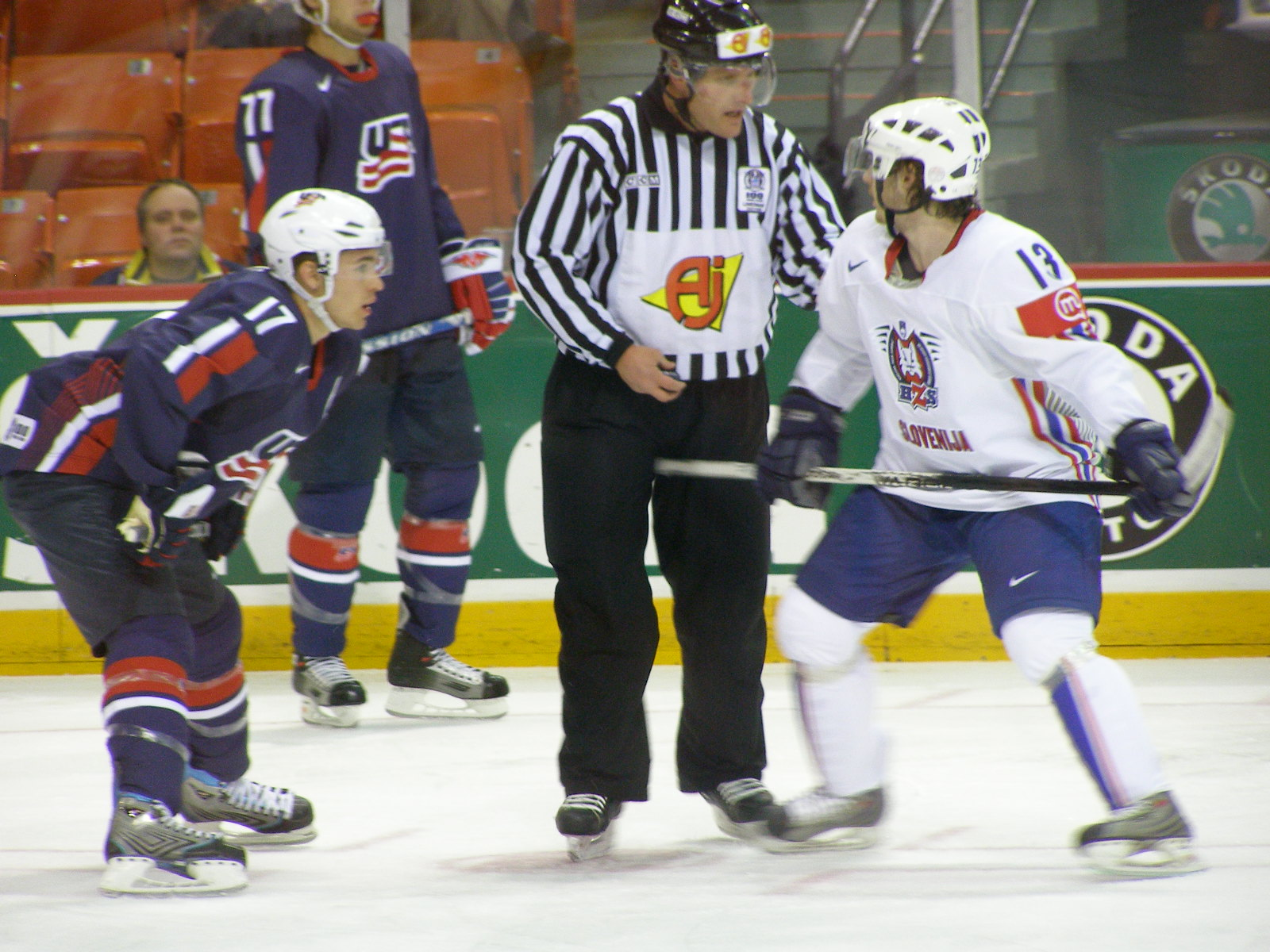
- Pajič (right) at the 2008 IIHF World Championship
- Born: September 26, 1985 (age 40) Jesenice, SFR Yugoslavia
- Height: 5 ft 9 in (175 cm)
- Weight: 183 lb (83 kg; 13 st 1 lb)
- Position: Forward
- Shoots: Left
- Italy2 team Former teams: HC Eppan Pirates; HC Bílí Tygři Liberec; HC Slovan Ústečtí Lvi; BK Mladá Boleslav; SG Pontebba; HC Pustertal Wölfe; Fife Flyers; Bolzano HC; Motor České Budějovice
- National team: Slovenia
- NHL draft: Undrafted
- Playing career: 2004–present

Rok Pajič (born September 26, 1985) is a Slovenian professional ice hockey player currently being a trainer in Italian Hockey League

He participated at the 2011 IIHF World Championship as a member of the Slovenia men's national ice hockey team.

His father Murajica Pajič and uncle Boris Pajič are both former ice hockey players.
