= Alexander Kitarov =

Belarusian ice hockey player

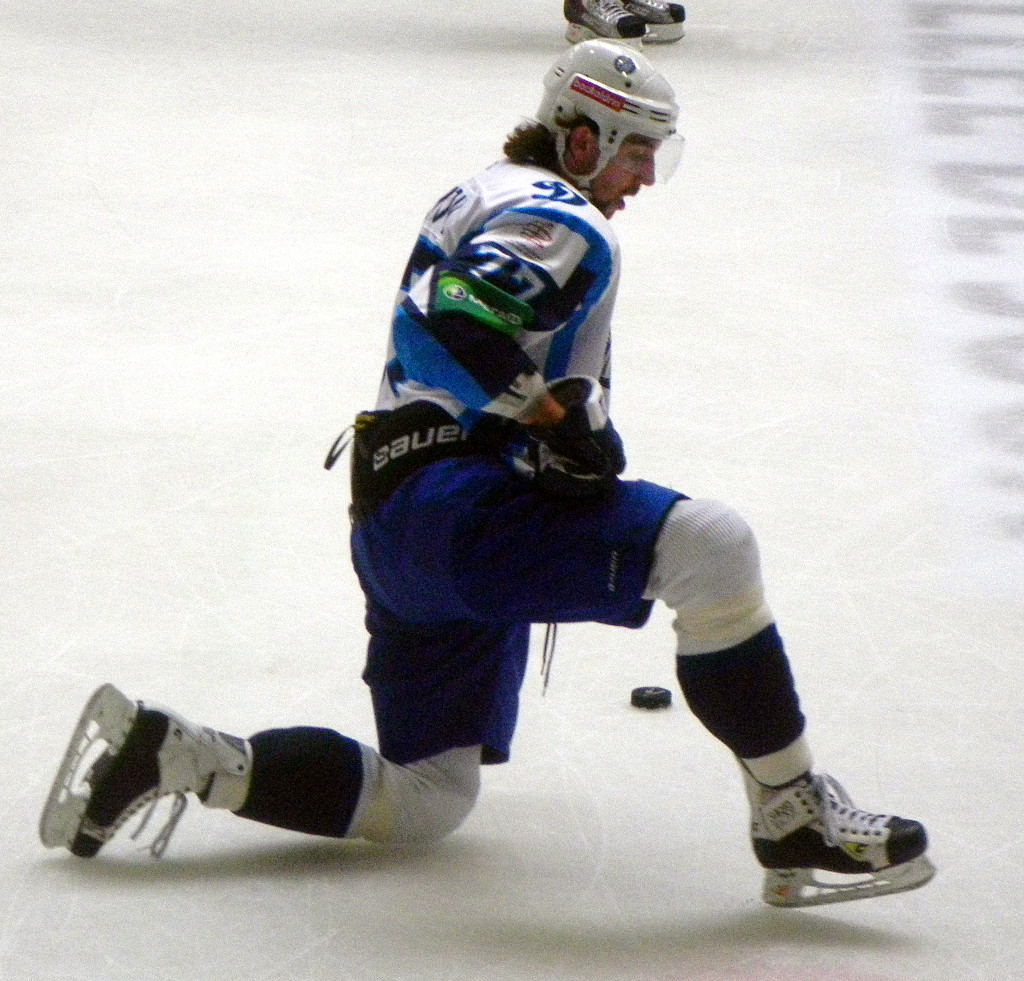
- Born: June 18, 1987 (age 39) Novopolotsk, Byelorussian Soviet Socialist Republic, Soviet Union
- Height: 6 ft 3 in (191 cm)
- Weight: 223 lb (101 kg; 15 st 13 lb)
- Position: Forward
- Shoots: Left
- BXL team Former teams: Yunost Minsk; Dinamo Minsk; Neftekhimik Nizhnekamsk; Kunlun Red Star
- National team: Belarus
- Playing career: 2005–present

Alexander Kitarov (born June 18, 1987) is a Belarusian professional ice hockey player who is currently playing for Yunost Minsk in the Belarusian Extraleague (BXL).

He participated in the 2011 IIHF World Championship as a member of the Belarus men's national ice hockey team.
