= Marcel Müller =

German ice hockey player

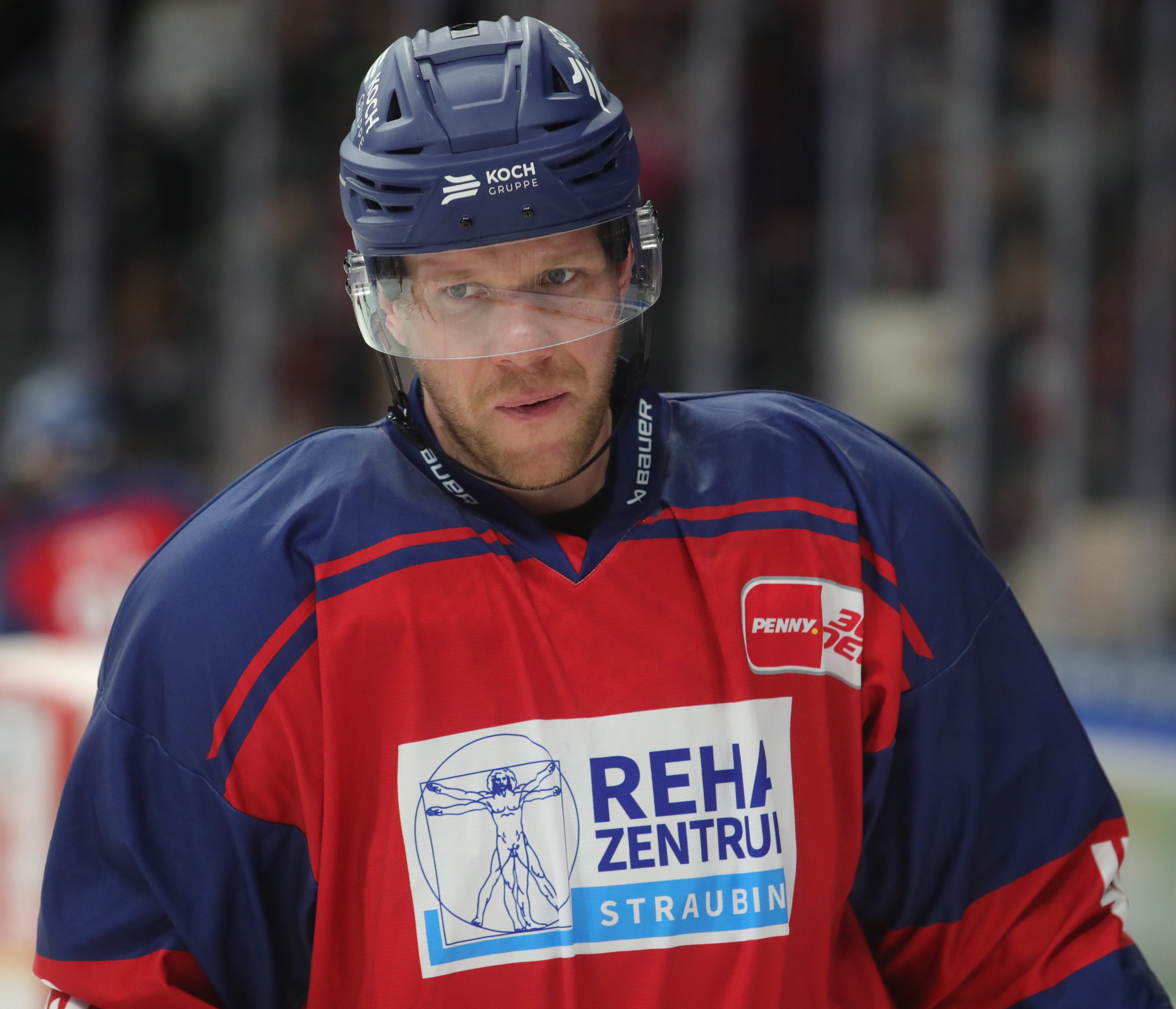
- Born: July 10, 1988 (age 38) East Berlin, East Germany
- Height: 6 ft 4 in (193 cm)
- Weight: 229 lb (104 kg; 16 st 5 lb)
- Position: Left wing
- Shoots: Left
- DEL2 team Former teams: Krefeld Pinguine; Eisbären Berlin; Kölner Haie; Toronto Maple Leafs; Modo Hockey; Hamburg Freezers; Linköping HC; Straubing Tigers
- National team: Germany
- NHL draft: Undrafted
- Playing career: 2005–present

Marcel Müller (born July 10, 1988) is a German professional ice hockey left winger currently playing with Krefeld Pinguine in the DEL2.

== Playing career ==
Müller began playing professionally with Eisbären Berlin of the Deutsche Eishockey Liga in the 2005–06 season. He played with Berlin and their junior team in the third-level Oberliga for two seasons. He then joined the Kölner Haie in 2007.

The 2009–10 season was his most successful season in the DEL, scoring for 56 points in 53 games during the regular season. He also received a career high total of 122 penalty minutes. Müller was selected to play for the German national team for the 2010 Winter Olympics.

On July 14, 2010, Müller signed a two-year entry-level contract with the Toronto Maple Leafs. In his first season, after initially being assigned to affiliate, the Toronto Marlies for the 2010–11 season, Mueller was recalled and on January 15, 2011 he played his first NHL regular season game, a shootout loss to Calgary at home.

Unable to establish a role with the Maple Leafs, on July 20, 2012, Müller left to sign with the MoDo Hockey of the Swedish Elitserien. In signing with Modo, Mueller also became the franchise's inaugural German player.

After one season with Modo, Müller returned to his native Germany and signed with former club, Kölner Haie on June 28, 2013. In his second season in cologne, Mueller left after 6 games in switching to Krefeld Pinguine for the remainder of the campaign.

On April 28, 2015, Müller signed a three-year contract as a free agent to join his fourth DEL team, the Hamburg Freezers.

After the Freezers pull-out from the DEL 2016, he returned to his previous club for the 2016–17 season with Krefeld Pinguine. He featured in 43 games with the Pinguine, producing 37 points before leaving on February 15, 2017, as he signed a deal with Swedish SHL team Linköping HC for the remainder of the campaign.

As a free agent, Müller opted to again return to Krefeld to play in his third stint with the club on a one-year deal on April 25, 2017. In the 2017–18 season, Müller appeared in 43 games with Krefeld to lead the club with 24 goals and 52 points. While out of playoff contention, Müller left Krefeld to play out the remainder of the season with Swedish club, Leksands IF of the HockeyAllsvenskan in their bid for promotion to the SHL.

On April 6, 2018, Müller opted for another third stint in returning to former club, Kölner Haie, on a one-year contract.

As a free agent, on May 11, 2022, Müller signed a three-year contract with newly relegated Krefeld Pinguine of the DEL2, with the ambition to return the club to the top flight in his third stint with the club.

== Career statistics ==
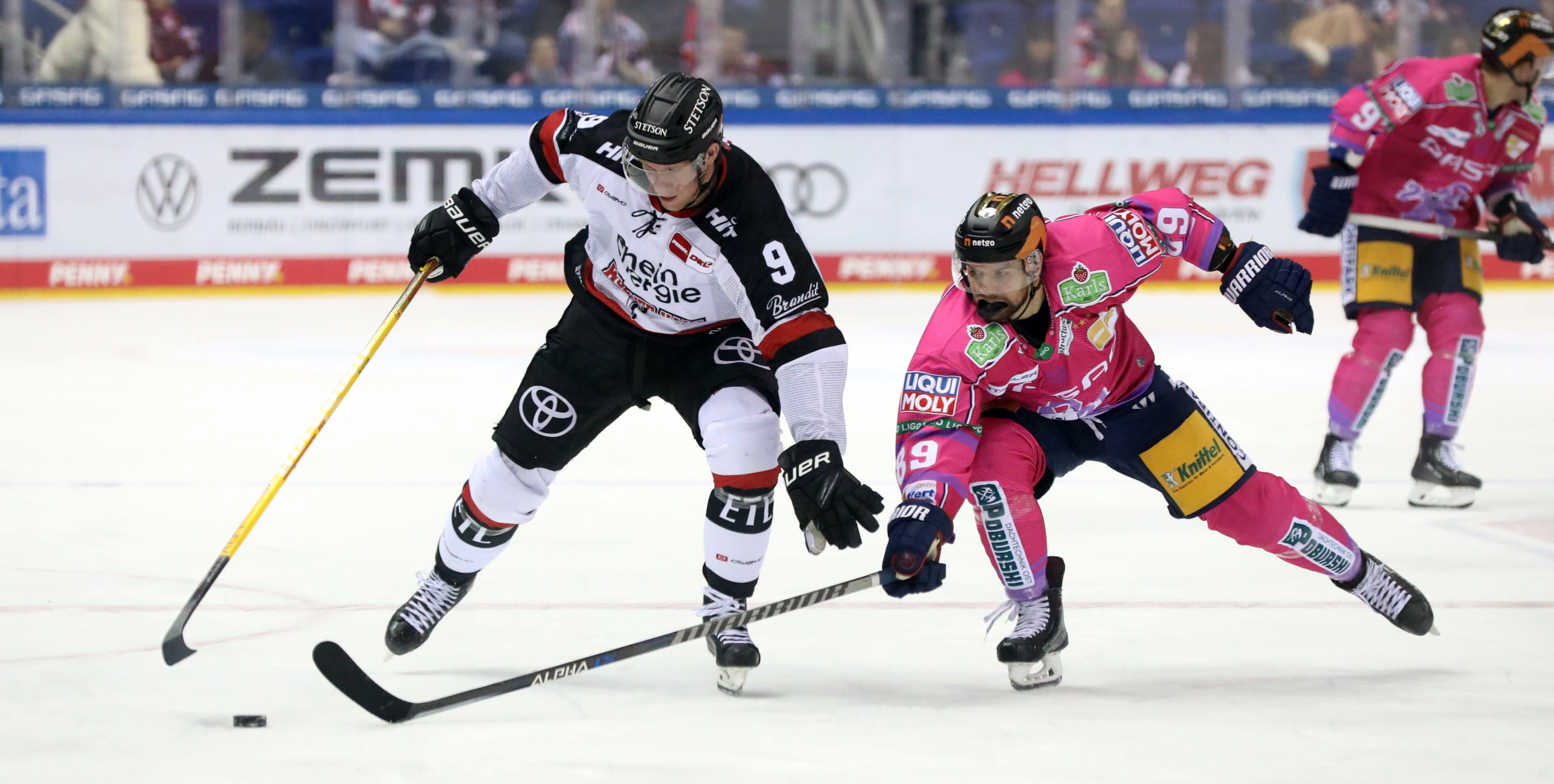
Müller (left) with Kölner Haie (2021)

=== Regular season and playoffs ===
			Regular season					Playoffs
Season	Team	League	GP	G	A	Pts	PIM	GP	G	A	Pts	PIM
2003–04	Jungadler Mannheim	DNL	27	3	5	8	51	4	1	2	3	4
2004–05	Jungadler Mannheim	DNL	25	21	13	34	75	—	—	—	—	—
2004–05	Mannheimer ERC II	GER.4	3	1	1	2	4	—	—	—	—	—
2005–06	Eisbären Juniors Berlin	DNL	8	9	4	13	50	1	0	0	0	0
2005–06	Eisbären Juniors Berlin	GER.3	24	5	6	11	89	—	—	—	—	—
2005–06	Eisbären Berlin	DEL	24	1	1	2	20	—	—	—	—	—
2006–07	Eisbären Juniors Berlin	GER.3	9	1	3	4	18	—	—	—	—	—
2006–07	Eisbären Berlin	DEL	36	1	7	8	53	3	0	0	0	14
2007–08	Kölner Haie	DEL	44	6	7	13	61	14	1	1	2	6
2008–09	Kölner Haie	DEL	41	11	14	25	60	—	—	—	—	—
2009–10	Kölner Haie	DEL	53	24	32	56	122	3	0	4	4	2
2010–11	Toronto Marlies	AHL	57	14	19	33	44	—	—	—	—	—
2010–11	Toronto Maple Leafs	NHL	3	0	0	0	2	—	—	—	—	—
2011–12	Toronto Marlies	AHL	72	14	33	47	71	9	2	3	5	4
2012–13	Modo Hockey	SEL	53	8	14	22	34	5	2	2	4	16
2013–14	Kölner Haie	DEL	45	8	20	28	93	17	1	4	5	12
2014–15	Kölner Haie	DEL	6	0	2	2	29	—	—	—	—	—
2014–15	Krefeld Pinguine	DEL	32	19	16	35	18	3	3	2	5	0
2015–16	Hamburg Freezers	DEL	50	8	18	26	55	—	—	—	—	—
2016–17	Krefeld Pinguine	DEL	43	15	22	37	98	—	—	—	—	—
2016–17	Linköpings HC	SHL	9	2	1	3	4	6	2	0	2	4
2017–18	Krefeld Pinguine	DEL	43	24	28	52	48	—	—	—	—	—
2017–18	Leksands IF	Allsv	8	2	6	8	10	10	0	3	3	16
2019–20	Kölner Haie	DEL	40	12	11	23	49	—	—	—	—	—
2020–21	Kölner Haie	DEL	38	10	9	19	42	—	—	—	—	—
2020–21	EC Kassel Huskies	DEL2	6	4	4	8	2	—	—	—	—	—
2021–22	Kölner Haie	DEL	46	11	15	26	33	5	0	0	0	27
2022–23	Krefeld Pinguine	DEL2	50	24	46	70	26	12	3	11	14	4
2023–24	Straubing Tigers	DEL	31	9	7	16	6	—	—	—	—	—
2024–25	Straubing Tigers	DEL	22	2	2	4	8	—	—	—	—	—
2024–25	Krefeld Pinguine	DEL2	10	4	6	10	2	8	5	5	10	4
DEL totals			594	161	211	372	795	45	5	11	16	61
NHL totals			3	0	0	0	2	—	—	—	—	—

=== International ===
Year	Team	Event	GP	G	A	Pts	PIM
2005	Germany	U17	5	2	0	2	4
2006	Germany	U18	6	0	4	4	4
2007	Germany	WJC	6	1	0	1	4
2008	Germany	WJC D1	4	1	2	3	35
2010	Germany	OG	4	0	2	2	12
2010	Germany	WC	9	1	1	2	0
2011	Germany	WC	7	1	4	5	6
2013	Germany	OGQ	3	0	2	2	2
Junior totals			21	4	6	10	47
Senior totals			23	2	9	11	20
