= David Petrasek =

Swedish ice hockey player (born 1976)

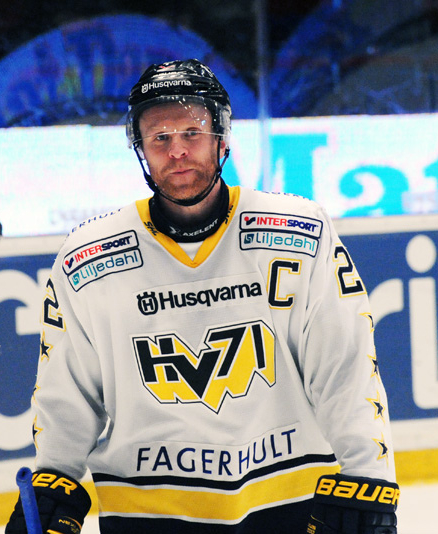
- David Petrasek playing for HV71 during an away game against AIK in February 2014
- Born: February 1, 1976 (age 49); Jönköping, Sweden
- Height: 6 ft 2 in (188 cm)
- Weight: 209 lb (95 kg; 14 st 13 lb)
- Position: Defence
- Shot: Right
- Played for: KHL; HC Dinamo Minsk; Elitserien; Malmö Redhawks; HV71
- National team: Sweden
- NHL draft: 226th overall, 1998; Detroit Red Wings
- Playing career: 1994–2016

David Petrasek (born February 1, 1976) is a Swedish former professional ice hockey defenceman who last played with HV71 in the Swedish Elitserien.

== Playing career ==
Petrasek started his playing career with HV71's youth team in 1993. Until the season 1996–97, when he became a regular in the senior squad, he played both with the youth team and the senior team. He was part of the senior squad in the playoffs of 1995 and won the first Swedish Championship for HV71. From 2000–01 to 2004–05 Petrasek was contracted by Malmö Redhawks but returned to HV71 for season 2005–06. In 2008, he won his second Swedish Championship, again with HV71 as an alternate captain for the team. Petrasek's HV71 contract runs through the 2009–10 season. David Petrasek had 53 points (in 52 games) in 2009–10, the highest point total of any defenseman in SHL league history. On July 7, 2010, Petrasek left the Sweden for the first time in his professional career and signed as a free agent to a one-year contract with Belarus team HC Dinamo Minsk of the KHL.

Petrasek is the current record holder for the number of SHL games played, both for the number of regular season games played and the combined total number of games played including playoff games. He surpassed Mikael Håkanson's regular season record on September 14, 2013, when he played his 809th regular season game. After playing another four games in the 2013–14 season, Petrasek also beat Håkanson's combined record when he had played his 951st SHL game overall.

On March 17, 2016, Petrasek officially announced his retirement.

== Awards ==
- Swedish Champion with HV71 in 1995.
- Swedish Champion with HV71 in 2008.
- Elitserien playoff silver medal with HV71 in 2009.
- Swedish Champion with HV71 in 2010.

== Career statistics ==
=== Regular season and playoffs ===
			Regular season					Playoffs
Season	Team	League	GP	G	A	Pts	PIM	GP	G	A	Pts	PIM
1993–94	HV71	SWE U20	14	3	3	6	26	—	—	—	—	—
1994–95	HV71	J20	19	8	9	17	55	—	—	—	—	—
1994–95	HV71	SEL	30	0	1	1	6	11	0	0	0	0
1995–96	HV71	J20	12	1	5	6	16	—	—	—	—	—
1995–96	HV71	SEL	35	0	1	1	14	1	0	0	0	0
1996–97	HV71	J20	3	0	0	0	0	—	—	—	—	—
1996–97	HV71	SEL	49	2	4	6	12	5	0	0	0	4
1997–98	HV71	SEL	43	6	7	13	80	5	2	2	4	14
1998–99	HV71	SEL	45	3	4	7	48	—	—	—	—	—
1999–2000	HV71	SEL	46	4	6	10	54	5	1	1	2	41
2000–01	Malmö IF	SEL	47	7	7	14	74	9	1	1	2	8
2001–02	MIF Redhawks	SEL	47	2	9	11	48	2	1	0	1	2
2002–03	MIF Redhawks	SEL	50	7	6	13	72	—	—	—	—	—
2003–04	MIF Redhawks	SEL	49	8	16	24	123	—	—	—	—	—
2004–05	Malmö Redhawks	SEL	49	10	15	25	72	—	—	—	—	—
2005–06	HV71	SEL	44	5	10	15	87	10	1	2	3	14
2006–07	HV71	SEL	54	10	10	20	108	14	2	5	7	51
2007–08	HV71	SEL	52	2	20	22	76	17	6	4	10	18
2008–09	HV71	SEL	52	6	22	28	91	12	0	10	10	30
2009–10	HV71	SEL	52	15	38	53	101	16	5	6	11	16
2010–11	Dinamo Minsk	KHL	53	7	19	26	52	7	1	3	4	24
2011–12	Sibir Novosibirsk	KHL	21	2	6	8	22	—	—	—	—	—
2011–12	Atlant Moscow Oblast	KHL	12	0	1	1	16	—	—	—	—	—
2011–12	HV71	SEL	15	2	7	9	6	6	1	3	4	10
2012–13	HV71	SEL	49	8	14	22	44	5	1	2	3	6
2013–14	HV71	SHL	45	1	8	9	36	7	0	0	0	4
2014–15	HV71	SHL	34	0	5	5	36	6	0	0	0	2
SEL/SHL totals			887	98	210	308	1188	131	21	36	57	220

=== International ===
Year	Team	Event	GP	G	A	Pts	PIM
1994	Sweden	EJC	5	1	2	3	8
1996	Sweden	WJC	7	1	0	1	6
2011	Sweden	WC	9	2	4	6	10
Junior totals			12	2	2	4	14
Senior totals			9	2	4	6	10
