= Andrei Stepanov (ice hockey) =

Belarusian ice hockey player

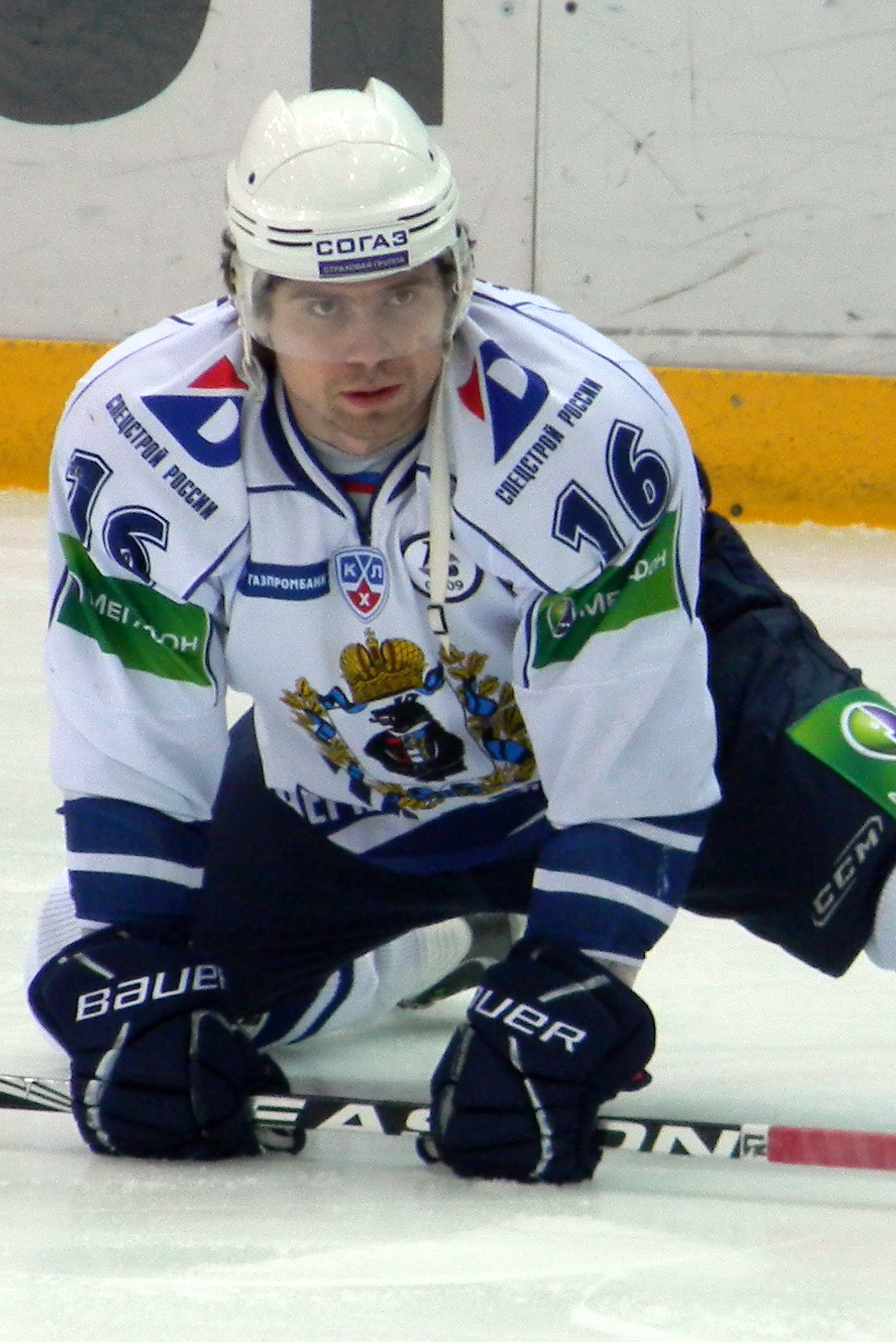
- Born: April 14, 1986 (age 38); Moscow, Russian SFSR, USSR
- Height: 5 ft 10 in (178 cm)
- Weight: 212 lb (96 kg; 15 st 2 lb)
- Position: Forward
- Shoots: Right
- BXL team Former teams: Dinamo-Molodechno; Krylya Sovetov Moscow; Torpedo Nizhny Novgorod; HC MVD; HC Vityaz; Metallurg Novokuznetsk; Yunost Minsk; Amur Khabarovsk; Sibir Novosibirsk; Neftekhimik Nizhnekamsk; Dinamo Minsk; Lada Togliatti
- National team: Belarus
- Playing career: 2003–present

Andrei Stepanov (born April 14, 1986) is a Belarusian professional ice hockey player who is currently playing for HC Dinamo-Molodechno of the Belarusian Extraleague (BXL).

He participated at the 2011 IIHF World Championship as a member of the Belarus men's national ice hockey team.
