= Jarkko Immonen =

Finnish ice hockey player (born 1982)

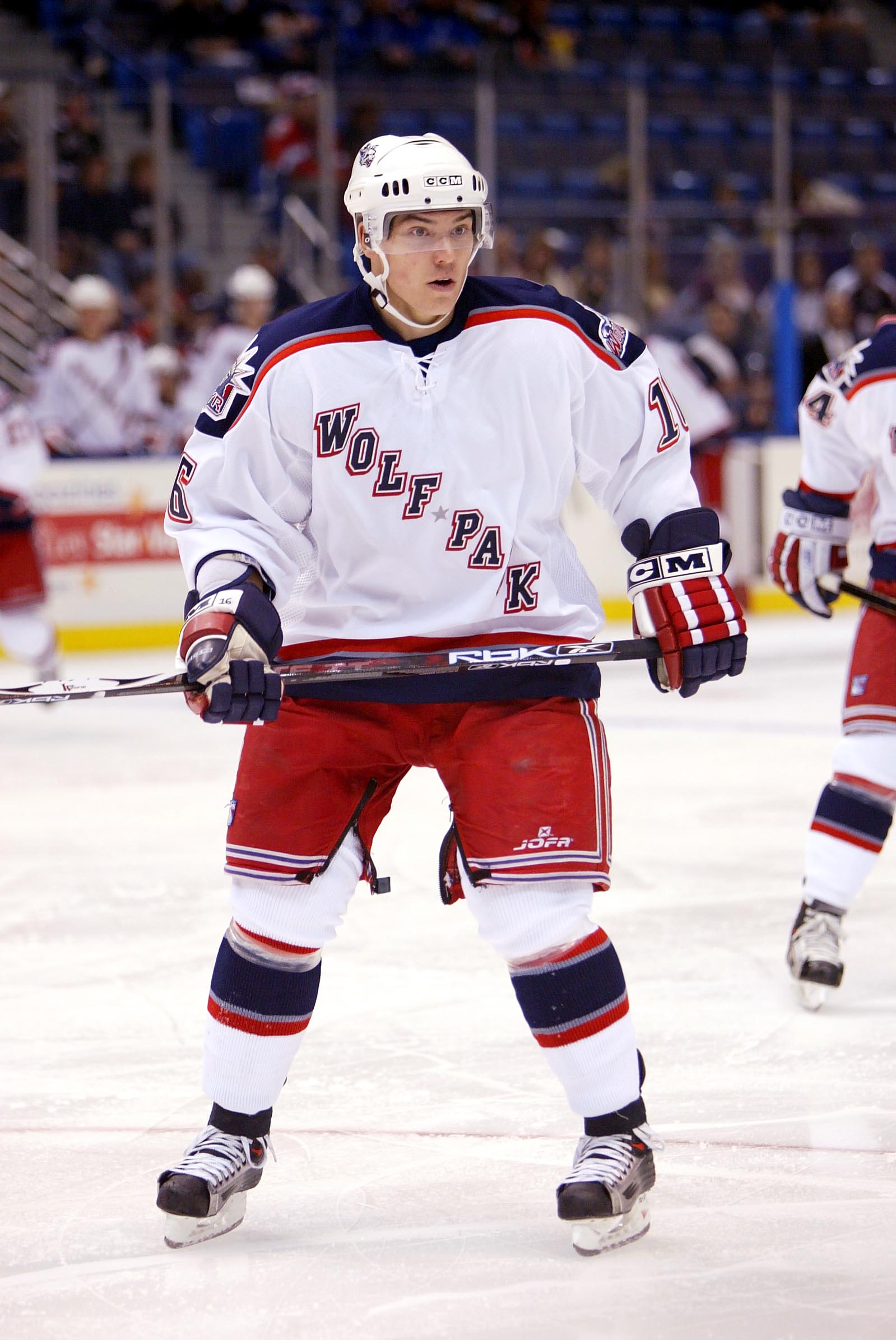
- Immonen with the Hartford Wolf Pack in 2006
- Born: April 19, 1982 (age 44) Rantasalmi, Finland
- Height: 5 ft 11 in (180 cm)
- Weight: 201 lb (91 kg; 14 st 5 lb)
- Position: Centre
- Shot: Right
- Liiga team Former teams: Jukurit; Ässät; JYP Jyväskylä; New York Rangers; Ak Bars Kazan; Torpedo Nizhny Novgorod; EV Zug
- National team: Finland
- NHL draft: 254th overall, 2002; Toronto Maple Leafs
- Playing career: 1998–2024

Jarkko Immonen (born April 19, 1982) is a Finnish professional ice hockey forward currently playing for Mikkelin Jukurit of the Liiga.

== Playing career ==
Immonen made his debut in Finland's second-tier league Mestis with TuTo Hockey during the 2000–01 season. For the following year, he joined Ässät of the country's top-tier Liiga. He then signed with fellow Liiga side JYP Jyväskylä in 2002 and remained three years at the club.

Immonen was drafted by the Toronto Maple Leafs in the 2002 NHL Entry Draft as their eighth-round pick, 254th overall.

On March 3, 2004, Immonen was traded by the Maple Leafs to the New York Rangers as part of the Brian Leetch trade. He made his NHL debut for the Rangers during the 2005–06 season. In the course of his two-year stint with the Rangers, he played a total of 20 games in the NHL and mostly gained playing time in the American Hockey League (AHL) with the Hartford Wolf Pack. In his 141 AHL contests played, he scored 54 goals and had 75 assists.

He returned to Finland for the 2007-08 campaign, again joining JYP, where he spent another two years and won the Finnish championship in 2009, before signing with Ak Bars Kazan of the Kontinental Hockey League (KHL) shortly after. In his first year, he won the championship with Kazan. After four years with Ak Bars, Immonen decided to move on and join fellow KHL team Torpedo Nizhny Novgorod for the 2014–15 season.

On March 30, 2015, he agreed to a two-year contract with Swiss club, EV Zug of the NLA. At the conclusion of his contract with Zug, Immonen returned to Finland to play with his original club, JYP on a three-year contract from the 2017–18 season.

On 14 April 2021, Immonen extended his professional career, leaving JYP as a free agent and signing a one-year contract with fellow Liiga club, Mikkelin Jukurit.

ON 5 May 2024, Immonen announced his retirement via an Instagram post.

== International play ==
Immonen won the bronze medal with Finland at the 2010 Vancouver Winter Olympics. He won the gold medal with Finland at the 2011 IIHF World Championship, where he scored the most goals (9 in 9 games) and the most points (12) in the tournament. He was also named to the all-star lineup.

== Career statistics ==
=== Regular season and playoffs ===
			Regular season					Playoffs
Season	Team	League	GP	G	A	Pts	PIM	GP	G	A	Pts	PIM
1997–98	SaPKo	FIN.2 U20	14	8	12	20	0	—	—	—	—	—
1998–99	SaPKo	FIN.2 U20	12	6	10	16	14	—	—	—	—	—
1998–99	SaPKo	FIN.2	36	2	2	4	6	—	—	—	—	—
1999–2000	SaPKo	FIN.2 U20	2	1	1	2	10	—	—	—	—	—
1999–2000	SaPKo	FIN.2	42	18	16	34	34	—	—	—	—	—
2000–01	TuTo	FIN U20	1	0	1	1	0	—	—	—	—	—
2000–01	TuTo	Mestis	41	20	20	40	22	11	5	7	12	10
2001–02	Ässät	SM-l	44	0	2	2	6	—	—	—	—	—
2001–02	Ässät	FIN.2 U20	—	—	—	—	—	5	4	0	4	6
2002–03	JYP	SM-l	56	10	23	33	34	7	1	1	2	8
2003–04	JYP	SM-l	52	23	26	49	28	2	0	0	0	0
2004–05	JYP	SM-l	54	19	28	47	24	3	0	2	2	2
2005–06	Hartford Wolf Pack	AHL	74	30	40	70	34	6	2	3	5	2
2005–06	New York Rangers	NHL	6	2	0	2	0	—	—	—	—	—
2006–07	Hartford Wolf Pack	AHL	54	20	26	46	30	7	2	6	8	2
2006–07	New York Rangers	NHL	14	1	5	6	4	—	—	—	—	—
2007–08	JYP	SM-l	54	26	37	63	54	6	1	8	9	8
2008–09	JYP	SM-l	58	23	41	64	40	15	1	10	11	24
2009–10	Ak Bars Kazan	KHL	56	13	26	39	26	22	4	10	14	8
2010–11	Ak Bars Kazan	KHL	53	21	17	38	30	9	2	4	6	2
2011–12	Ak Bars Kazan	KHL	53	14	12	26	8	12	0	2	2	0
2012–13	Ak Bars Kazan	KHL	50	11	20	31	10	18	4	4	8	12
2013–14	Torpedo Nizhny Novgorod	KHL	54	14	24	38	18	7	3	1	4	2
2014–15	Torpedo Nizhny Novgorod	KHL	57	17	22	39	26	5	2	2	4	2
2015–16	EV Zug	NLA	49	24	17	41	22	4	0	2	2	4
2016–17	EV Zug	NLA	49	12	14	26	28	15	4	6	10	41
2017–18	JYP	Liiga	59	13	37	50	14	6	3	1	4	14
2018–19	JYP	Liiga	60	15	32	47	42	3	0	1	1	2
2019–20	JYP	Liiga	59	21	23	44	14	—	—	—	—	—
2020–21	JYP	Liiga	59	13	15	28	14	—	—	—	—	—
2021–22	Jukurit	Liiga	60	18	10	28	24	7	1	1	2	2
Liiga totals			615	182	274	456	294	49	7	24	31	60
NHL totals			20	3	5	8	4	—	—	—	—	—
KHL totals			323	90	121	211	118	73	15	23	38	26

Medal record

Representing Finland

Ice hockey

Olympic Games
Bronze medal – third place	2014 Sochi	
Bronze medal – third place	2010 Vancouver	

World Championships
Gold medal – first place	2011 Slovakia	
Silver medal – second place	2014 Belarus	

World Junior Championships
Bronze medal – third place	2002 Czech Republic	

=== International ===
Year	Team	Event	Result	GP	G	A	Pts	PIM
2000	Finland	WJC18	1st place, gold medalist(s)	7	3	4	7	4
2002	Finland	WJC	3rd place, bronze medalist(s)	7	4	3	7	6
2009	Finland	WC	5th	7	1	4	5	2
2010	Finland	OG	3rd place, bronze medalist(s)	6	0	0	0	0
2010	Finland	WC	6th	7	3	1	4	4
2011	Finland	WC	1st place, gold medalist(s)	9	9	3	12	2
2012	Finland	WC	4th	10	3	2	5	0
2014	Finland	OG	3rd place, bronze medalist(s)	5	2	0	2	2
2014	Finland	WC	2nd place, silver medalist(s)	10	3	3	6	2
2015	Finland	WC	6th	7	0	0	0	2
Junior totals				14	7	7	14	10
Senior totals				61	21	13	34	14
