= Andrej Hočevar =

Slovenian ice hockey player

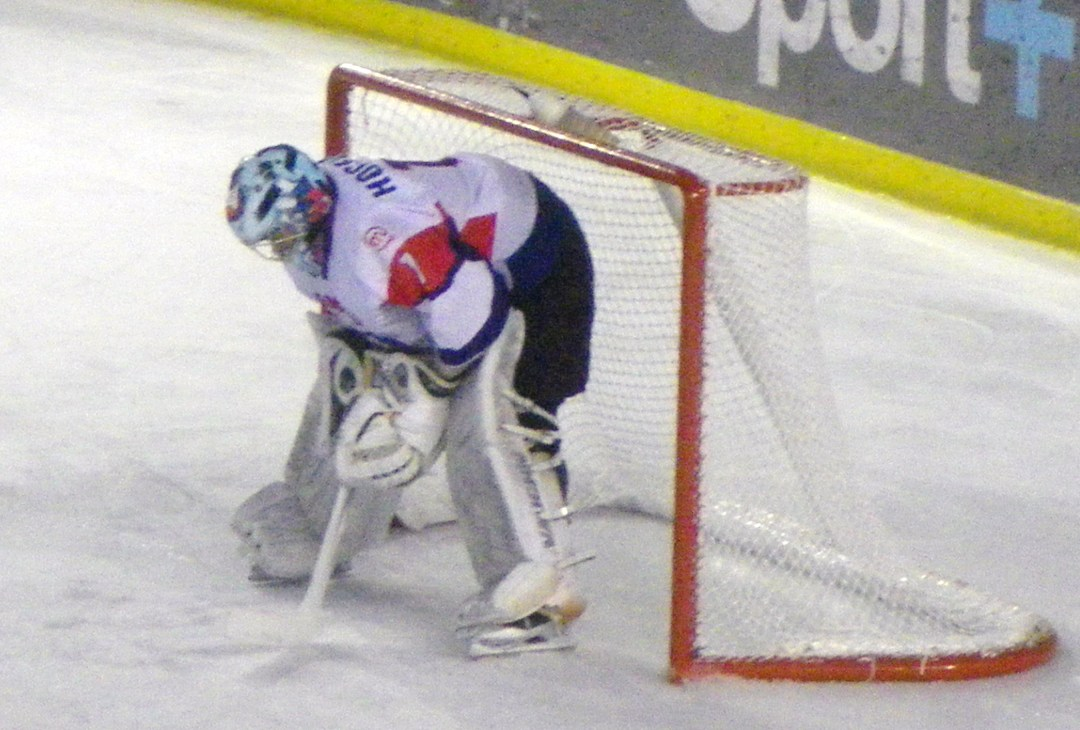
- Born: November 21, 1984 (age 40); Ljubljana, Yugoslavia
- Height: 6 ft 0 in (183 cm)
- Weight: 187 lb (85 kg; 13 st 5 lb)
- Position: Goaltender
- Catches: Left
- France team: Dauphins d'Épinal
- National team: Slovenia
- NHL draft: Undrafted
- Playing career: 2004–present

Andrej Hočevar (born November 21, 1984) is a Slovenian ice hockey goaltender. He participated at the 2011 IIHF World Championship as a member of the Slovenia men's national ice hockey team.
