= Fabian Weinhandl =

Austrian ice hockey player

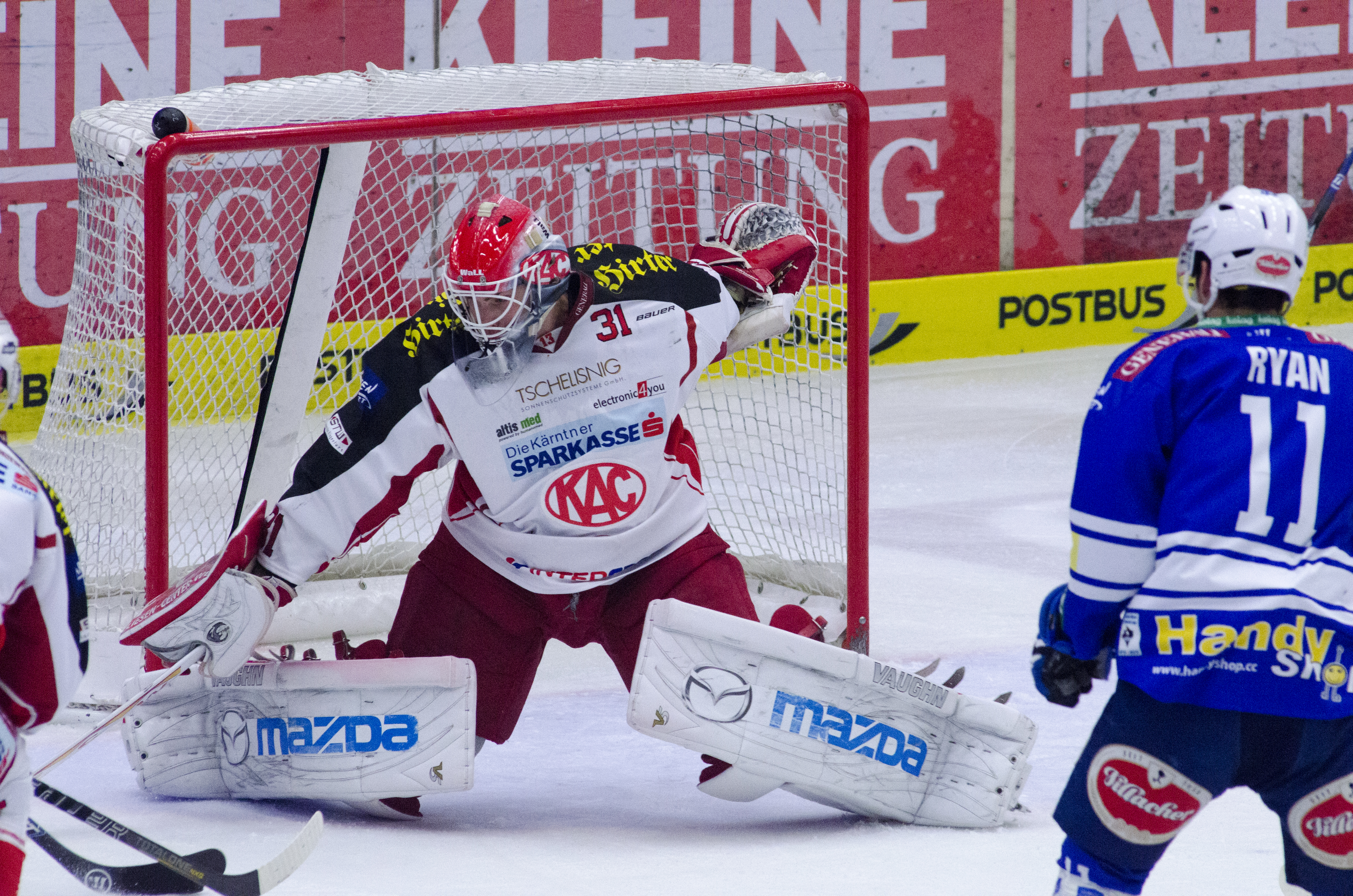
- Born: January 3, 1987 (age 38); Graz, Austria
- Height: 6 ft 3 in (191 cm)
- Weight: 218 lb (99 kg; 15 st 8 lb)
- Position: Goaltender
- Catches: Left
- EBEL team Former teams: Free Agent; Graz 99ers Vienna Capitals; EC KAC; Ritten/Renon; EC Red Bull Salzburg
- National team: Austria
- NHL draft: Undrafted
- Playing career: 2006–present

Fabian Weinhandl (born January 3, 1987) is an Austrian professional ice hockey goaltender who is currently an unrestricted free agent who was most recently under contract to EC Red Bull Salzburg of the Austrian Hockey League (EBEL).

He previously played with EC KAC after joined the club on April 10, 2013, from the Vienna Capitals on a two-year contract. On May 27, 2015, Weinhandl returned to the EBEL after a stint on loan to Ritten/Renon in the Italian Serie A, signing a one-year deal to serve as the backup with EC Red Bull Salzburg.

He participated at the 2011 IIHF World Championship as a member of the Austria men's national ice hockey team.
