= Kevin Lavallée (ice hockey, born 1981) =

Canadian-born German ice hockey player

- Born: December 12, 1981 (age 43); Montreal, Quebec, Canada
- Height: 6 ft 3 in (191 cm)
- Weight: 205 lb (93 kg; 14 st 9 lb)
- Position: Defence
- Shoots: Right
- DEL team Former teams: Fischtown Pinguins; Kassel Huskies; Augsburger Panther; EHC München; Kölner Haie; Hamburg Freezers; Iserlohn Roosters
- National team: Germany
- NHL draft: Undrafted
- Playing career: 2001–present

Kevin Lavallée (born December 12, 1981) is a Canadian-born German professional ice hockey defenceman playing for the Fischtown Pinguins in the Deutsche Eishockey Liga (DEL).

== Career ==
Lavallée previously played for Kölner Haie, EHC München, Hamburg Freezers and Iserlohn Roosters. He participated at the 2011 IIHF World Championship as a member of the Germany men's national ice hockey team.
