= Mads Bødker =

Danish ice hockey player

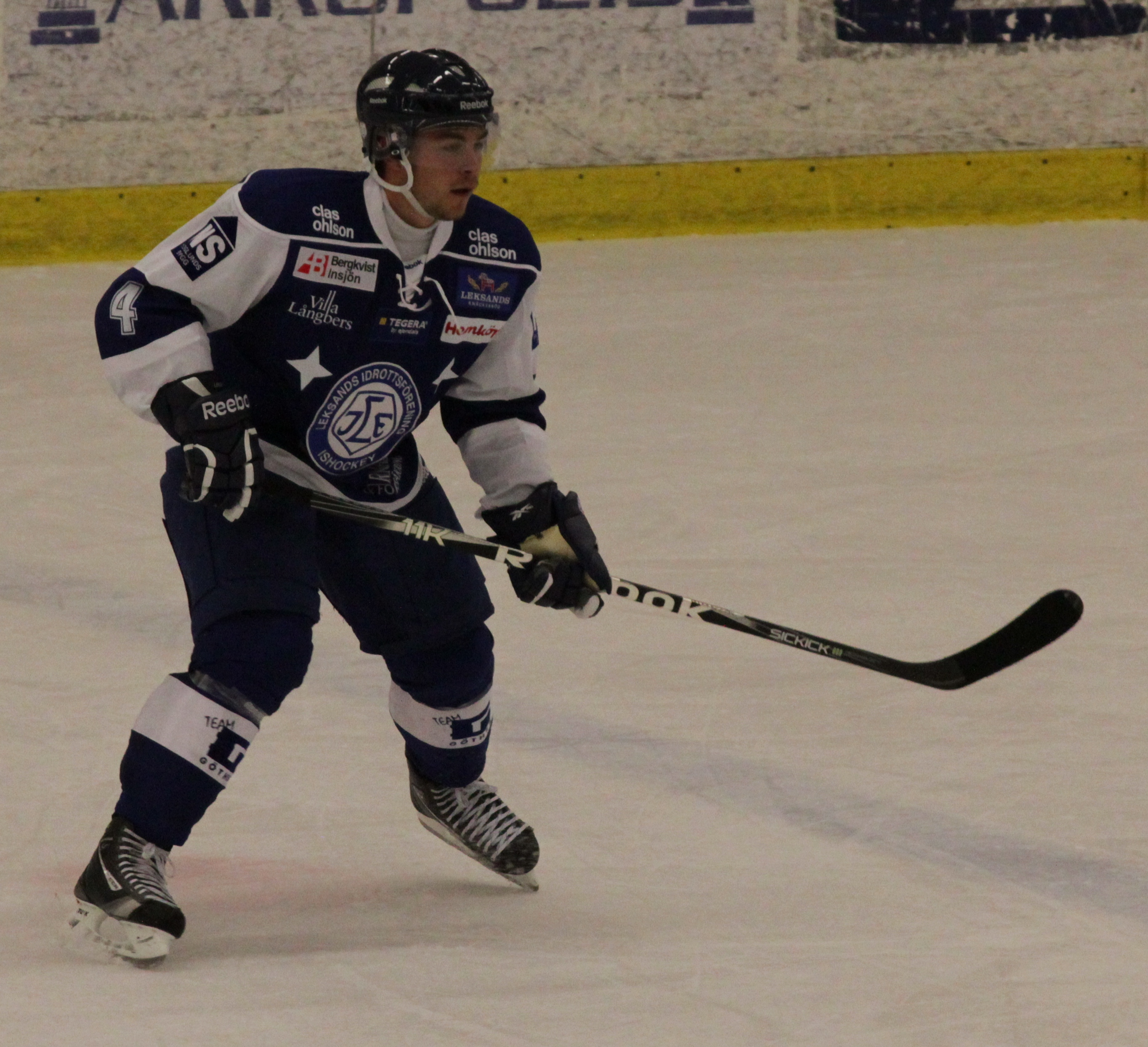
- Born: August 31, 1987 (age 37); Copenhagen, Denmark
- Height: 5 ft 9 in (175 cm)
- Weight: 176 lb (80 kg; 12 st 8 lb)
- Position: Defence
- Shot: Left
- Played for: Rødovre Mighty Bulls; Rögle BK; Düsseldorfer EG; SønderjyskE
- National team: Denmark
- NHL draft: Undrafted
- Playing career: 2006–2016

Mads Bødker (born August 31, 1987) is a retired Danish professional ice hockey defenceman who lastly played for SønderjyskE of the Danish Metal Ligaen. He has played three seasons with Rødovre Mighty Bulls of the Danish top league AL-Bank Ligaen, as well as participated in seven Ice Hockey World Championships as a member of the Denmark men's national ice hockey team. He is the older brother of HC Lugano winger Mikkel Bødker.
