= Peter Ország =

Slovak ice hockey referee (born 1969)

Peter Ország (born October 23, 1969, in Košice) is a Slovak ice hockey referee, who referees in the Slovak Extraliga.

== Career ==
He has officiated many international tournaments including the Winter Olympics. He has been named Slovak referee of the year.
