= 2013 IIHF World Championship final =

Ice hockey match

| | 1 | 2 | 3 | Total |
|---|---|---|---|---|
| Switzerland | 1 | 0 | 0 | 1 |
| Sweden | 2 | 0 | 3 | 5 |
- Date: 19 May 2013
- Arena: Ericsson Globe
- City: Stockholm
- Attendance: 12,500

The 2013 IIHF World Championship final was played at the Ericsson Globe in Stockholm, Sweden, on 19 May 2013 between Sweden and Switzerland. The game determined the winners of the 2013 IIHF World Championship, with Sweden winning 5–1.

== Background ==
This was Sweden's fifth final of the 21st century (their most recent final occurred in 2011), as well as the team's tenth final in history (discounting years when champions were determined through round-robins). Sweden had previously won eight gold medals. This was the first time a host nation qualified for the final since 2008, when Canada qualified for the final.

This was Switzerland's first final in history. Switzerland had previously won one silver medal (1935) and eight bronze medals, the most recent one in 1953. Switzerland was the only team in the tournament to go undefeated before the final, winning all nine games with one victory coming through a shootout.

Sweden and Switzerland faced each other in the semifinals in 1992 and 1998, with Sweden winning both times, but this was the first final between the two teams. The Swiss team won the preliminary round game against Sweden 3–2.

== Road to the final ==
Sweden
Round
Switzerland
Opponent
Result
Preliminary round
Opponent
Result
Switzerland
2–3
Game 1
Sweden
3–2
Czech Republic
2–1
Game 2
Canada
3–2 GWS
Belarus
2–1
Game 3
Czech Republic
5–2
Norway
5–1
Game 4
Slovenia
7–1
Canada
0–3
Game 5
Denmark
4–1
Slovenia
2–0
Game 6
Norway
3–1
Denmark
4–2
Game 7
Belarus
4–1

| Team | GP | W | OTW | OTL | L | GF | GA | DIF | PTS |
|---|---|---|---|---|---|---|---|---|---|
| Switzerland | 7 | 6 | 1 | 0 | 0 | 29 | 10 | +19 | 20 |
| Canada | 7 | 5 | 1 | 1 | 0 | 25 | 10 | +15 | 18 |
| Sweden | 7 | 5 | 0 | 0 | 2 | 17 | 11 | +6 | 15 |
| Czech Republic | 7 | 3 | 1 | 0 | 3 | 19 | 12 | +7 | 11 |
| Norway | 7 | 3 | 0 | 0 | 4 | 12 | 26 | −14 | 9 |
| Denmark | 7 | 1 | 1 | 1 | 4 | 13 | 20 | −7 | 6 |
| Belarus | 7 | 1 | 0 | 0 | 6 | 10 | 21 | −11 | 3 |
| Slovenia | 7 | 0 | 0 | 2 | 5 | 12 | 27 | −15 | 2 |

Preliminary

| Team | GP | W | OTW | OTL | L | GF | GA | DIF | PTS |
|---|---|---|---|---|---|---|---|---|---|
| Switzerland | 7 | 6 | 1 | 0 | 0 | 29 | 10 | +19 | 20 |
| Canada | 7 | 5 | 1 | 1 | 0 | 25 | 10 | +15 | 18 |
| Sweden | 7 | 5 | 0 | 0 | 2 | 17 | 11 | +6 | 15 |
| Czech Republic | 7 | 3 | 1 | 0 | 3 | 19 | 12 | +7 | 11 |
| Norway | 7 | 3 | 0 | 0 | 4 | 12 | 26 | −14 | 9 |
| Denmark | 7 | 1 | 1 | 1 | 4 | 13 | 20 | −7 | 6 |
| Belarus | 7 | 1 | 0 | 0 | 6 | 10 | 21 | −11 | 3 |
| Slovenia | 7 | 0 | 0 | 2 | 5 | 12 | 27 | −15 | 2 |

Opponent
Result
Playoff
Opponent
Result
Canada
3–2 GWS
Quarterfinals
Czech Republic
2–1
Finland
3–0
Semifinals
United States
3–0

== Match ==
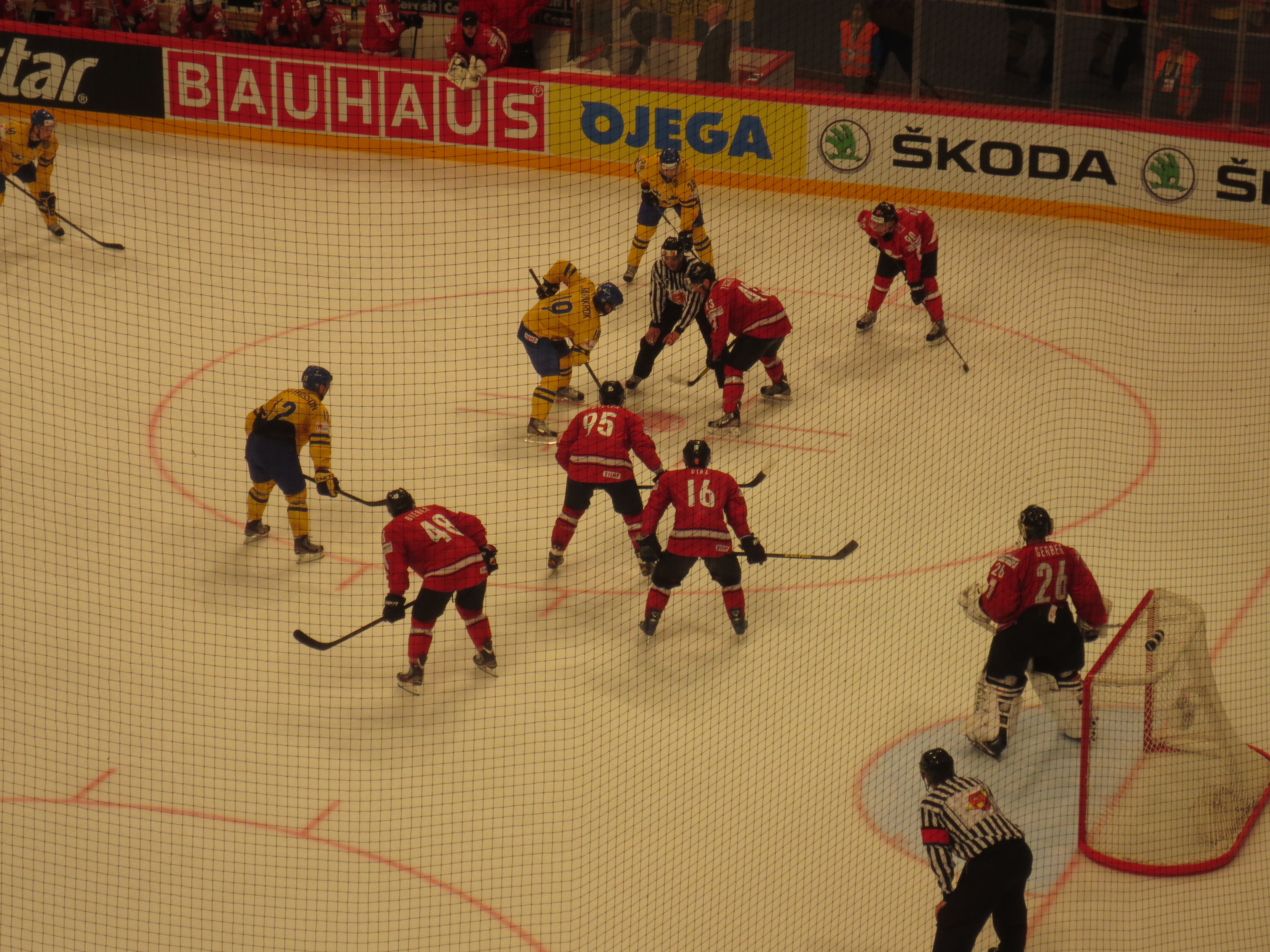
The final

=== Summary ===
Switzerland took early control of the game, and five minutes in, rushing defenceman Roman Josi opened the scoring with a backhand shot that went five-hole on Swedish goaltender Jhonas Enroth. After eight minutes of play, the Swiss had outshot the Swedes 8–0. Sweden regrouped and turned the game around in a three-minute span. At 8:42, Erik Gustafsson scored his first goal of the tournament to tie the game on a rebound in front of the net. Two minutes later, Sweden got a power play following a checking to the head penalty to Andres Ambühl, and at 11:38 Henrik Sedin scored to put Sweden ahead 2–1. Switzerland received a bench minor two minutes later for too many players on the ice, but the Swedes did not convert on the ensuing power play. The first period ended 2–1 in Sweden's favor.

The second period was scoreless and very even, featuring excellent play from Jhonas Enroth and Switzerland's goaltender Martin Gerber. The period featured one tripping penalty to Sweden at 32:01, and one hooking penalty to Switzerland at 39:10, but neither team managed to score any goals.

Two minutes into the third period, Switzerland received another power play from an interference penalty to Sweden but would pay for their lost chance to tie the game. At 47:13, Sweden's Simon Hjalmarsson scored on a breakaway to make the score 3–1, and eight minutes later, Loui Eriksson put the Swedes ahead by three goals. Following a tripping penalty to Sweden at 56:27, Switzerland pulled Martin Gerber for an extra attacker, but it only took nine seconds before Henrik Sedin sealed the game with an empty netter.

The game ended 5–1 for Sweden, who captured the team's ninth gold medal in history. The victory marked the first time since 1986 that a host nation won the tournament.

=== Details ===
| 19 May 2013; 20:30 | Switzerland | 1–5 (1–2, 0–0, 0–3) | Sweden | Ericsson Globe, Stockholm; Attendance: 12,500 |

Game reference

Martin Gerber
Goalies
Jhonas Enroth
Referees:
(Czech Republic) Antonín Jeřábek
(Russia) Konstantin Olenin
Linesmen:
(Belarus) Ivan Dedyulya
(Canada) Jesse Wilmot

| R. Josi (J. Walker) – 04:45 | 1–0 |
| | 1–1 | 08:42 – E. Gustafsson (F. Pettersson, J. Lundqvist) |
| | 1–2 | 11:38 – H. Sedin (PP) |
| | 1–3 | 47:13 – S. Hjalmarsson (G. Landeskog) |
| | 1–4 | 55:37 – L. Eriksson (H. Sedin) |
| | 1–5 | 56:36 – H. Sedin (ENG) |

18 min
Penalties
6 min
27
Shots
27
