= 2013 IIHF World Championship =

2013 edition of the IIHF World Championship

Tournament details
- Host countries: Sweden; Finland
- Venues: 2 (in 2 host cities)
- Dates: 3–19 May
- Opened by: Sauli Niinistö and Carl XVI Gustaf
- Teams: 16

Final positions
- Champions: Sweden (9th title)
- Runners-up: Switzerland
- Third place: United States
- Fourth place: Finland

Tournament statistics
- Games played: 64
- Goals scored: 332 (5.19 per game)
- Attendance: 427,818 (6,685 per game)
- Scoring leader(s): (Finland) Petri Kontiola (16 points)

Awards
- MVP: (Switzerland) Roman Josi

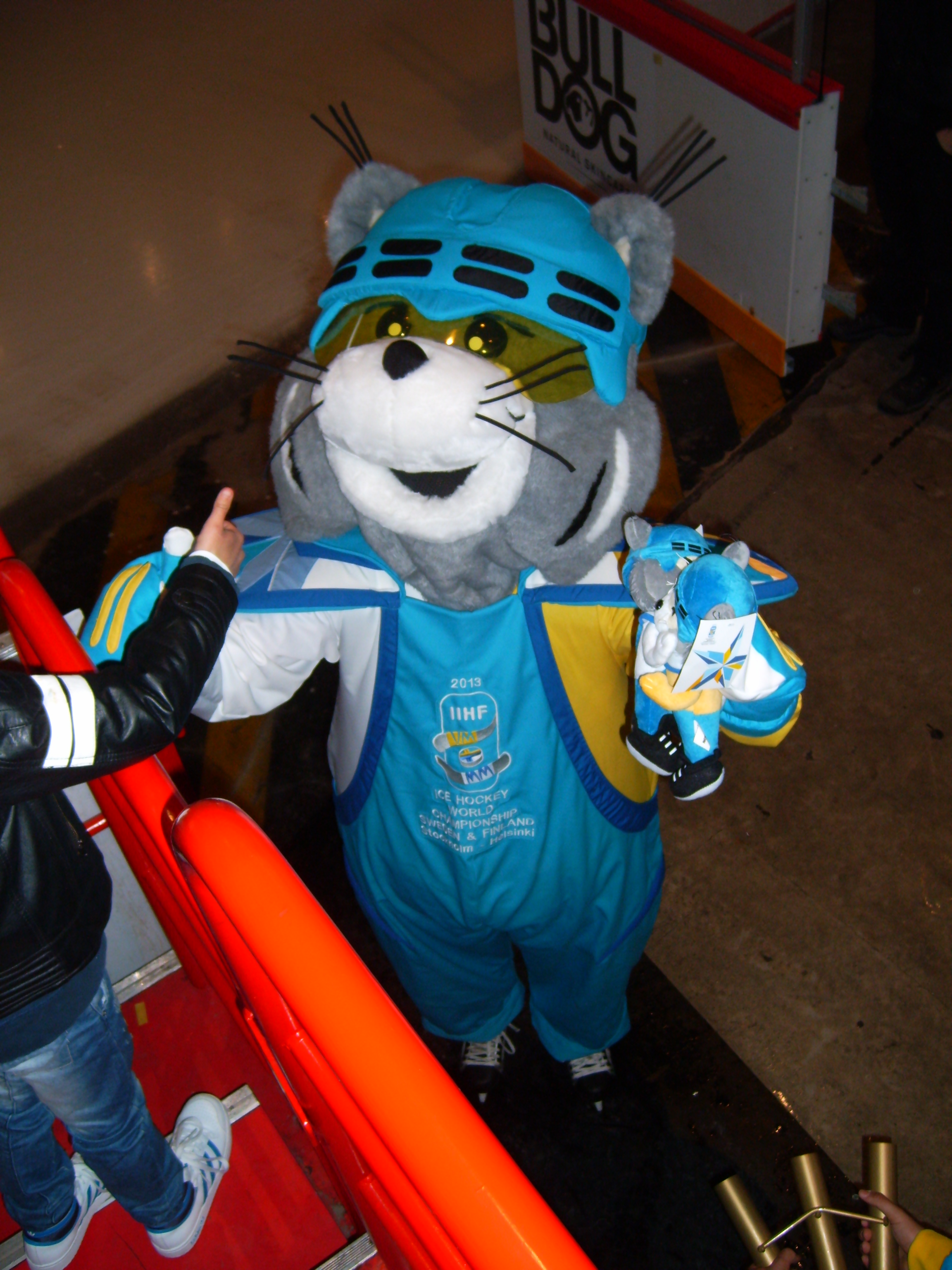
Icy, the mascot for the tournament.

The 2013 IIHF World Championship was the 77th event hosted by the International Ice Hockey Federation (IIHF), held in Stockholm, Sweden and Helsinki, Finland, between 3–19 May 2013. TV4 and MTV3 served as host broadcasters of the event.

The host team Sweden won the team's ninth title in history by defeating Switzerland in the final 5–1, and became the first host team to win the tournament since the Soviet Union team won the 1986 World Championship in Moscow, Soviet Union. The Swedish team started the tournament with an unconvincing performance but managed to get a collective boost when the Sedin brothers joined the team after the Vancouver Canucks had been eliminated in the Stanley Cup playoffs. Switzerland sent a clear message about their recently improved hockey program by going undefeated through the tournament before the final; finishing first in their group (ahead of Canada and Sweden); and earning their second silver medal in history, as well as the team's first medal since 1953.

== Bidding ==
At the semi-annual congress in Vancouver on 21 September 2007, Sweden was voted the host of the 2013 tournament, defeating the runner-up Belarus by 55 votes. Other countries in the running were Hungary, Czech Republic and Latvia (which withdrew from the race and endorsed the Swedish bid). At the congress in Bern in 2009, it was announced that Finland (the host for the 2012 World Championship) and Sweden would co-host both the 2012 and 2013 tournaments.

Kimmo Leinonen served as the general secretary of the jointly-hosted events.

=== Voting results ===
Country	Votes
Sweden	70
Belarus	15
Hungary	8
Czech Republic	3

== Locations ==
Ericsson Globe Capacity: 12 500	2013 IIHF World Championship is located in Scandinavia	Hartwall Areena Capacity: 13 506
(Sweden) Stockholm	2013 IIHF World Championship is located in Scandinavia	(Finland) Helsinki

The host arenas were the Ericsson Globe in Stockholm (12,500 permitted seats) and Hartwall Areena in Helsinki (13,506 permitted seats). Capacity has been limited to these numbers because of modern health and safety rules. Malmö Arena was originally planned to be the second arena, but because of a proposal made by the Finnish federation, the games were transferred to Helsinki, which gave the arena the opportunity to host the Eurovision Song Contest 2013. Tampere was also a candidate to be the Finnish venue, but due to a delay in construction of the new Tampereen Keskusareena, Helsinki was named as co-host. Also in Stockholm, the Tele2 Arena, a new retractable-roof multi-purpose stadium seating 30,000 spectators on the side of the Globen, was planned to host at least one game, but due to construction delays it would not be finished until July 2013, two months after the World Championship.

== Format ==
The format of the tournament was the same as in 2012, which was also co-hosted by Helsinki and Stockholm. Sixteen teams were divided into two groups of eight, who played a seven-game round-robin within their groups. The top four teams in each group advanced to a three-round single-knockout playoff.

The only difference from 2012 was that the final games were played in Stockholm instead of Helsinki.

== Nations ==
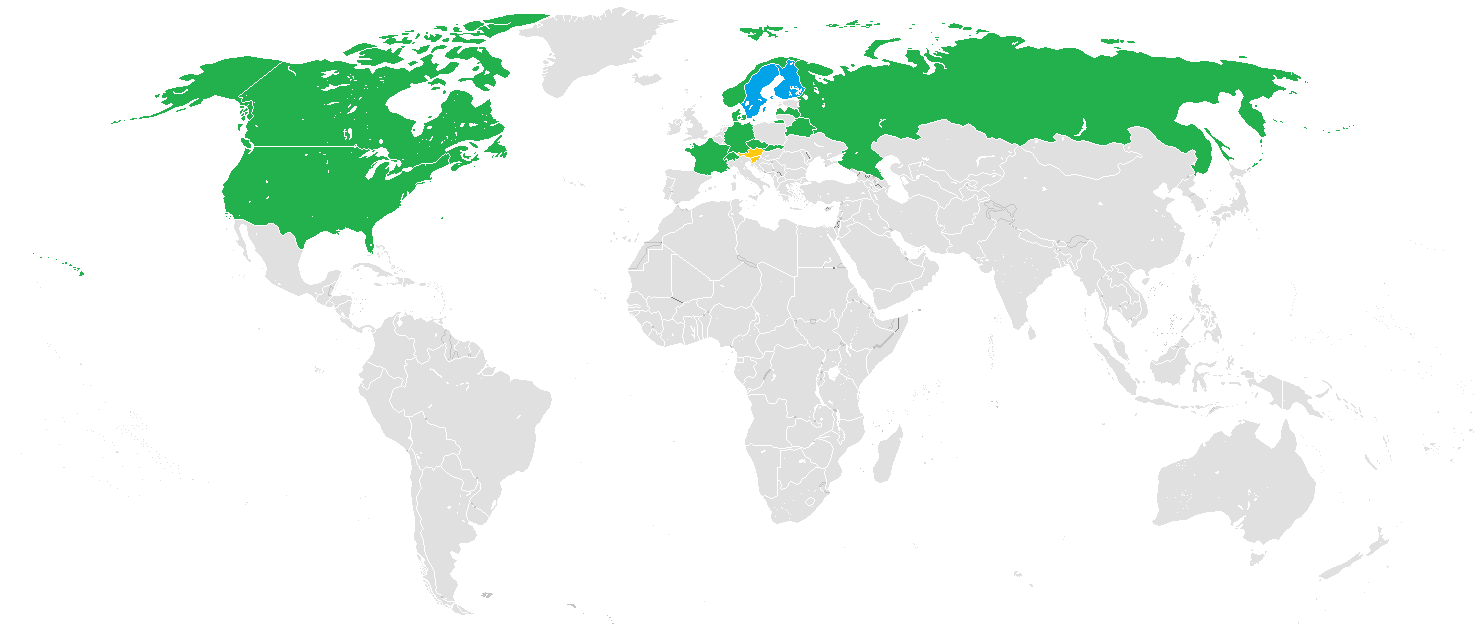
Participating nations of 2013 IIHF World Championship. Blue = hosts. Green = top 14 nation from WC 2012. Yellow = promoted from Division 1.

Europe

- Austria (Note: Qualified through winning a promotion at the 2012 IIHF World Championship Division I)
- Belarus (Note: Automatic qualifier after a top 14 placement at the 2012 IIHF World Championship)
- Czech Republic
- Denmark
- Finland^{†}
- France
- Germany
- Latvia
- Norway
- Russia
- Slovakia
- Slovenia
- Sweden (Note: Qualified as hosts (and as automatic qualifier))
- Switzerland

North America

- Canada
- United States

== Rosters ==
Each team's roster consisted of at least 15 skaters (forwards and defencemen) and two goaltenders, and at most 22 skaters and three goaltenders. All sixteen participating nations, through the confirmation of their respective national associations, had to submit a roster by the first IIHF directorate meeting.

== Officials ==
The IIHF selected 16 referees and 16 linesmen to work the 2013 IIHF World Championship. They were the following:

Referees

- (Canada) Matt Kirk
- (Canada) Derek Zalaski
- (Czech Republic) Martin Fraňo
- (Czech Republic) Antonín Jeřábek
- (Finland) Aleksi Rantala
- (Finland) Jyri Rönn
- (Germany) Lars Brüggemann
- (Germany) Daniel Piechaczek

Referees

- (Russia) Vyacheslav Bulanov
- (Russia) Konstantin Olenin
- (Slovakia) Vladimír Baluška
- (Sweden) Morgan Johansson
- (Sweden) Marcus Vinnerborg
- (Switzerland) Brent Reiber
- (United States) Ian Croft
- (United States) Keith Kaval

Linesmen

- (Belarus) Ivan Dedyulya
- (Canada) Chris Carlson
- (Canada) Jesse Wilmot
- (Czech Republic) Petr Blumel
- (Finland) Sakari Suominen
- (France) Pierre Dehaen
- (Germany) Sirko Hunnius
- (Germany) André Schrader

Linesmen

- (Norway) Jon Killian
- (Russia) Sergei Shelyanin
- (Slovakia) Miroslav Valach
- (Sweden) Jimmy Dahmen
- (Sweden) Johannes Käck
- (Switzerland) Roger Arm
- (United States) Jonathan Morisson
- (United States) Christopher Woodworth

== Seeding and groups ==
The seeding in the preliminary round is based on the 2012 IIHF World Ranking, which ended at the conclusion of the 2012 IIHF World Championship. The teams were grouped according to seeding (in parentheses is the corresponding world ranking). However, Russia and the Czech Republic swapped their slots between their groups to optimize the seeding for the Finnish-Swedish organizers.

Group S

- Czech Republic (3)
- Sweden (4)
- Canada (5)
- Norway (8)
- Switzerland (9)
- Denmark (12)
- Belarus (13)
- Slovenia (18)

Group H

- Russia (1)
- Finland (2)
- Slovakia (6)
- United States (7)
- Germany (10)
- Latvia (11)
- France (14)
- Austria (15)

== Preliminary round ==
Team advanced to the Playoff round
Team relegated to 2014 Division I A

=== Group H ===
Pos	Team	Pld	W	OTW	OTL	L	GF	GA	GD	Pts	Qualification or relegation
1	Finland	7	4	2	0	1	23	14	+9	16	Advance to playoff round
2	Russia	7	5	0	0	2	29	14	+15	15	Advance to playoff round
3	United States	7	5	0	0	2	24	16	+8	15	Advance to playoff round
4	Slovakia	7	3	0	1	3	18	17	+1	10	Advance to playoff round
5	Germany	7	2	1	1	3	13	16	−3	9	
6	Latvia	7	2	0	1	4	14	25	−11	7	
7	France	7	2	0	1	4	13	21	−8	7	
8	Austria	7	1	1	0	5	18	29	−11	5	Relegated to Division I A

Source: IIHF

All times are local (UTC+3).

3 May 2013; 16:15	France	2–6 (0–1, 0–2, 2–3)	Slovakia	Hartwall Areena, Helsinki; Attendance: 6,966

Game reference

Cristobal Huet
Fabrice Lhenry
Goalies
Rastislav Staňa
Referees:
(Switzerland) Brent Reiber
(Canada) Derek Zalaski
Linesmen:
(Norway) Jon Killian
(Canada) Jesse Wilmot

	0–1	08:28 – M. Miklík (T. Záborský)
	0–2	25:27 – P. Ölvecký (M. Ďaloga)
	0–3	28:34 – T. Záborský (R. Kukumberg)
	0–4	43:50 – B. Radivojevič (T. Kopecký, M. Bližňák) (PP)
	0–5	44:40 – M. Šatan (L. Hudáček, M. Jurčina) (PP)
D. Raux (T. Bozon, C. Bertrand) (PP2) – 45:32	1–5
D. Fleury (P-É. Bellemare, S. Treille) (PP) – 51:58	2–5
	2–6	58:57 – L. Hudáček (A. Sekera, R. Kukumberg)

8 min
Penalties
8 min
26
Shots
37

3 May 2013; 20:15	Finland	4–3 OT (1–0, 1–1, 1–2) (OT 1–0)	Germany	Hartwall Areena, Helsinki; Attendance: 12,115

Game reference

Joni Ortio
Goalies
Rob Zepp
Referees:
(Czech Republic) Martin Fraňo
(Canada) Matt Kirk
Linesmen:
(Switzerland) Roger Arm
(Belarus) Ivan Dedyulya

P. Kontiola (J. Aaltonen, J. Pesonen) (PP) – 10:22	1–0
	1–1	30:21 – F. Schütz (M. Goc, A. Rankel)
J. Pesonen (J. Hietanen, P. Kontiola) (PP) – 39:27	2–1
	2–2	42:34 – C. Ehrhoff (M. Goc) (PP)
	2–3	56:55 – T. Ankert (M. Goc, P. Gogulla)
P. Kontiola (J. Pesonen) – 58:31	3–3
V-M. Savinainen (S. Salminen, T. Mäntylä) – 61:58	4–3

6 min
Penalties
18 min
38
Shots
18

4 May 2013; 12:15	United States	5–3 (1–2, 4–1, 0–0)	Austria	Hartwall Areena, Helsinki; Attendance: 8,202

Game reference

Ben Bishop
Goalies
Bernhard Starkbaum
Referees:
(Sweden) Morgan Johansson
(Finland) Aleksi Rantala
Linesmen:
(Czech Republic) Petr Blumel
(Belarus) Ivan Dedyulya

	0–1	04:58 – M. Latusa (T. Hundertpfund)
	0–2	05:38 – D. Welser (M. Iberer)
D. Moss (J. Faulk, P. Stastny) (PP) – 10:02	1–2
E. Johnson (N. Bjugstad, D. Kristo) – 23:38	2–2
T. Stapleton (D. LeBlanc, J. Faulk) – 29:31	3–2
A. Palushaj (D. Kristo, N. Bjugstad) – 30:57	4–2
	4–3	33:21 – D. Schuller (M. Peintner, R. Lukas)
E. Johnson (PP) – 38:32	5–3

2 min
Penalties
6 min
29
Shots
21

4 May 2013; 16:15	Russia	6–0 (1–0, 3–0, 2–0)	Latvia	Hartwall Areena, Helsinki; Attendance: 5,293

Game reference

Ilya Bryzgalov
Goalies
Māris Jučers
Edgars Masaļskis
Referees:
(Switzerland) Brent Reiber
(Canada) Derek Zalaski
Linesmen:
(Germany) Sirko Hunnius
(Sweden) Johannes Käck

E. Biryukov (S. Soin, A. Svitov) – 13:03	1–0
Y. Medvedev (K. Petrov) – 28:44	2–0
A. Radulov (I. Kovalchuk, E. Biryukov) – 32:59	3–0
E. Ryasensky (A. Perezhogin, A. Belov) – 38:55	4–0
I. Kovalchuk (A. Loktionov) – 40:17	5–0
K. Petrov (A. Tereshchenko, Y. Medvedev) (PP) – 44:11	6–0

4 min
Penalties
31 min
34
Shots
15

4 May 2013; 20:15	Finland	2–0 (1–0, 0–0, 1–0)	Slovakia	Hartwall Areena, Helsinki; Attendance: 12,078

Game reference
Antti Raanta	Goalies	Rastislav Staňa	Referees: (Czech Republic) Antonín Jeřábek (Sweden) Marcus Vinnerborg; Linesmen: (Switzerland) Roger Arm (United States) Jonathan Morisson
J. Aaltonen (P. Kontiola, S. Lepistö) – 11:28 / 1–0; P. Kontiola – 42:09 / 2–0			Referees: (Czech Republic) Antonín Jeřábek (Sweden) Marcus Vinnerborg; Linesmen: (Switzerland) Roger Arm (United States) Jonathan Morisson
10 min	Penalties	8 min	Referees: (Czech Republic) Antonín Jeřábek (Sweden) Marcus Vinnerborg; Linesmen: (Switzerland) Roger Arm (United States) Jonathan Morisson
23	Shots	36	Referees: (Czech Republic) Antonín Jeřábek (Sweden) Marcus Vinnerborg; Linesmen: (Switzerland) Roger Arm (United States) Jonathan Morisson

5 May 2013; 12:15	France	3–1 (2–0, 1–0, 0–1)	Austria	Hartwall Areena, Helsinki; Attendance: 3,471

Game reference

Cristobal Huet
Goalies
Bernhard Starkbaum
Referees:
(Czech Republic) Martin Fraňo
(Sweden) Marcus Vinnerborg
Linesmen:
(Czech Republic) Petr Blumel
(Germany) Sirko Hunnius

D. Fleury – 03:36	1–0
T. Da Costa (A. Roussel, B. Henderson) – 04:17	2–0
J. Desrosiers (L. Meunier) – 37:10	3–0
	3–1	47:23 – T. Vanek (M. Peintner, T. Pöck) (EA)

4 min
Penalties
4 min
26
Shots
36

5 May 2013; 16:15	Germany	1–4 (0–0, 0–2, 1–2)	Russia	Hartwall Areena, Helsinki; Attendance: 3,705

Game reference

Dennis Endras
Goalies
Semyon Varlamov
Referees:
(Sweden) Morgan Johansson
(Finland) Aleksi Rantala
Linesmen:
(Norway) Jon Killian
(United States) Jonathan Morisson

	0–1	23:20 – I. Kovalchuk (Y. Medvedev)
	0–2	30:09 – I. Kovalchuk (A. Radulov)
J. Tripp (M. Wolf, C. Ehrhoff) (PP) – 45:03	1–2
	1–3	58:20 – I. Kovalchuk (A. Radulov, Y. Medvedev)
	1–4	59:39 – D. Kokarev (S. Soin, A. Svitov) (ENG)

2 min
Penalties
10 min
27
Shots
26

5 May 2013; 20:15	Latvia	1–4 (0–0, 1–2, 0–2)	United States	Hartwall Areena, Helsinki; Attendance: 5,048

Game reference

Edgars Masaļskis
Goalies
Ben Bishop
Referees:
(Czech Republic) Antonín Jeřábek
(Canada) Matt Kirk
Linesmen:
(Sweden) Johannes Käck
(Canada) Jesse Wilmot

A. Kulda (J. Sprukts, L. Dārziņš) – 21:11	1–0
	1–1	22:11 – T. Stapleton (B. Butler)
	1–2	24:21 – D. Moss (P. Stastny, J. Trouba) (PP)
	1–3	50:55 – B. Butler (T. Stapleton, E. Johnson) (PP)
	1–4	52:21 – M. Hunwick (P. Stastny, C. Smith)

14 min
Penalties
12 min
20
Shots
26

6 May 2013; 16:15	Germany	2–3 (1–0, 0–1, 1–2)	Slovakia	Hartwall Areena, Helsinki; Attendance: 5,078

Game reference

Rob Zepp
Goalies
Rastislav Staňa
Referees:
(Czech Republic) Martin Fraňo
(Switzerland) Brent Reiber
Linesmen:
(Switzerland) Roger Arm
(Belarus) Ivan Dedioulia

M. Wolf (N. Goc, P. Gogulla) – 04:01	1–0
	1–1	33:30 – M. Bližňák (M. Sersen)
M. Kink (J. Tripp, B. Kohl) – 43:01	2–1
	2–2	45:41 – T. Záborský (V. Mihálik, R. Kukumberg)
	2–3	52:46 – T. Záborský (J. Stümpel, R. Kukumberg)

2 min
Penalties
4 min
32
Shots
33

6 May 2013; 20:15	Finland	3–1 (0–0, 2–0, 1–1)	France	Hartwall Areena, Helsinki; Attendance: 12,158

Game reference

Joni Ortio
Goalies
Fabrice Lhenry
Florian Hardy
Referees:
(Canada) Matt Kirk
(Canada) Derek Zalaski
Linesmen:
(Norway) Jon Killian
(Canada) Jesse Wilmot

J. Pesonen (J. Aaltonen, P. Kontiola) (PP) – 34:41	1–0
J. Aaltonen (P. Kontiola, J. Hietanen) – 35:19	2–0
	2–1	40:43 – P-É. Bellemare (S. Treille, D. Fleury)
V. Viitaluoma (O. Väänänen, A. Pihlström) – 48:36	3–1

12 min
Penalties
12 min
22
Shots
22

7 May 2013; 16:15	Austria	6–3 (2–1, 2–1, 2–1)	Latvia	Hartwall Areena, Helsinki; Attendance: 3,051

Game reference

Bernhard Starkbaum
Goalies
Edgars Masaļskis
Referees:
(Sweden) Morgan Johansson
(Finland) Aleksi Rantala
Linesmen:
(Germany) Sirko Hunnius
(United States) Jonathan Morisson

	0–1	03:52 – A. Bērziņš (R. Ķēniņš, G. Meija)
F. Iberer (T. Hundertpfund) – 13:45	1–1
A. Lakos (M. Latusa, G. Baumgartner) (PP) – 17:09	2–1
T. Vanek – 23:05	3–1
M. Altmann (D. Welser, A. Kristler) – 26:58	4–1
	4–2	38:08 – A. Saviels (J. Andersons, M. Indrašis)
	4–3	40:52 – L. Dārziņš (M. Cipulis) (PP)
M. Raffl (T. Hundertpfund) – 49:42	5–3
D. Oberkofler (T. Pöck, D. Schuller) – 56:50	6–3

6 min
Penalties
8 min
25
Shots
39

7 May 2013; 20:15	Russia	5–3 (2–2, 1–1, 2–0)	United States	Hartwall Areena, Helsinki; Attendance: 6,038

Game reference

Ilya Bryzgalov
Goalies
Ben Bishop
Referees:
(Czech Republic) Antonín Jeřábek
(Sweden) Marcus Vinnerborg
Linesmen:
(Czech Republic) Petr Blumel
(Sweden) Johannes Käck

A. Belov (D. Denisov, A. Anisimov) – 05:23	1–0
	1–1	10:58 – P. Stastny (C. Smith)
	1–2	13:28 – P. Stastny (J. Faulk) (PP)
I. Kovalchuk (I. Nikulin, A. Radulov) – 14:04	2–2
	2–3	27:09 – M. Hunwick (A. Palushaj)
A. Tereschenko (S. Mozyakin, K. Petrov) – 31:19	3–3
Y. Medvedev (S. Mozyakin, A. Tereschenko) – 53:35	4–3
A. Radulov (I. Kovalchuk) (PP) – 55:27	5–3

8 min
Penalties
18 min
30
Shots
22

8 May 2013; 16:15	Austria	0–2 (0–0, 0–1, 0–1)	Germany	Hartwall Areena, Helsinki; Attendance: 6,820

Game reference
Bernhard Starkbaum	Goalies	Rob Zepp	Referees: (Russia) Vyacheslav Bulanov (United States) Ian Croft; Linesmen: (Switzerland) Roger Arm (Norway) Jon Killian
0–1 / 37:00 – M. Kink; 0–2 / 59:51 – M. Kink (AG, SH, ENG)			Referees: (Russia) Vyacheslav Bulanov (United States) Ian Croft; Linesmen: (Switzerland) Roger Arm (Norway) Jon Killian
8 min	Penalties	16 min	Referees: (Russia) Vyacheslav Bulanov (United States) Ian Croft; Linesmen: (Switzerland) Roger Arm (Norway) Jon Killian
27	Shots	35	Referees: (Russia) Vyacheslav Bulanov (United States) Ian Croft; Linesmen: (Switzerland) Roger Arm (Norway) Jon Killian

8 May 2013; 20:15	United States	4–1 (1–1, 0–0, 3–0)	Finland	Hartwall Areena, Helsinki; Attendance: 12,484

Game reference

John Gibson
Goalies
Antti Raanta
Referees:
(Germany) Lars Brüggemann
(Switzerland) Brent Reiber
Linesmen:
(Belarus) Ivan Dedyulya
(Canada) Jesse Wilmot

	0–1	05:53 – J. Koskiranta (J. Pesonen, J. Hietanen)
C. Smith (D. Moss, C. Butler) – 17:36	1–1
C. Smith (P. Stastny, J. Faulk) (PP) – 43:22	2–1
S. Gionta (N. Thompson) – 51:29	3–1
C. Smith (P. Stastny, D. Moss) (ENG) – 59:18	4–1

12 min
Penalties
8 min
25
Shots
32

9 May 2013; 16:15	Russia	1–2 (0–0, 1–2, 0–0)	France	Hartwall Areena, Helsinki; Attendance: 3,173

Game reference

Vasili Koshechkin
Goalies
Florian Hardy
Referees:
(Czech Republic) Martin Fraňo
(Finland) Aleksi Rantala
Linesmen:
(France) Pierre Dehaen
(Finland) Sakari Suominen

A. Perezhogin (A. Popov, A. Belov) – 26:57	1–0
	1–1	29:52 – D. Fleury (P-É. Bellemare, K. Hecquefeuille)
	1–2	36:48 – A. Roussel

4 min
Penalties
6 min
29
Shots
19

9 May 2013; 20:15	Slovakia	3–5 (1–3, 1–1, 1–1)	Latvia	Hartwall Areena, Helsinki; Attendance: 3,124

Game reference

Rastislav Staňa
Jaroslav Janus
Goalies
Kristers Gudļevskis
Referees:
(Sweden) Marcus Vinnerborg
(Canada) Derek Zalaski
Linesmen:
(Czech Republic) Petr Blumel
(Sweden) Johannes Käck

	0–1	00:15 – M. Cipulis (J. Sprukts)
T. Záborský (R. Kukumberg, M. Miklík) – 01:23	1–1
	1–2	13:00 – L. Dārziņš (PS)
	1–3	17:24 – Z. Girgensons (A. Kulda) (PP)
T. Surový (B. Mezei, M. Daňo) – 36:09	2–3
	2–4	38:50 – L. Dārziņš
	2–5	40:25 – L. Dārziņš
T. Surový (R. Vydarený, M. Jurčina) (PP) – 59:38	3–5

14 min
Penalties
8 min
27
Shots
24

10 May 2013; 16:15	Slovakia	1–2 GWS (1–0, 0–1, 0–0) (OT 0–0) (SO: 0–1)	Austria	Hartwall Areena, Helsinki; Attendance: 8,449

Game reference
Rastislav Staňa	Goalies	Bernhard Starkbaum	Referees: (Germany) Lars Brüggemann (Czech Republic) Martin Fraňo; Linesmen: (Belarus) Ivan Dedyulya (Norway) Jon Killian
T. Surový (M. Sersen, B. Radivojevič) – 09:00 / 1–0; / 1–1 / 33:17 – G. Unterluggauer (G. Baumgartner, D. Oberkofler)			Referees: (Germany) Lars Brüggemann (Czech Republic) Martin Fraňo; Linesmen: (Belarus) Ivan Dedyulya (Norway) Jon Killian
M. Bližňák (miss); T. Záborský (miss); M. Šatan (miss)	Shootout	(miss) M. Raffl; T. Vanek	Referees: (Germany) Lars Brüggemann (Czech Republic) Martin Fraňo; Linesmen: (Belarus) Ivan Dedyulya (Norway) Jon Killian
8 min	Penalties	6 min	Referees: (Germany) Lars Brüggemann (Czech Republic) Martin Fraňo; Linesmen: (Belarus) Ivan Dedyulya (Norway) Jon Killian
43	Shots	35	Referees: (Germany) Lars Brüggemann (Czech Republic) Martin Fraňo; Linesmen: (Belarus) Ivan Dedyulya (Norway) Jon Killian

10 May 2013; 20:15	Russia	2–3 (0–1, 1–2, 1–0)	Finland	Hartwall Areena, Helsinki; Attendance: 12,383

Game reference

Semyon Varlamov
Goalies
Antti Raanta
Referees:
(United States) Ian Croft
(Sweden) Marcus Vinnerborg
Linesmen:
(United States) Jonathan Morisson
(Canada) Jesse Wilmot

	0–1	03:22 – P. Kontiola (J. Aaltonen, S. Lepistö)
A. Radulov (I. Kovalchuk) (PP) – 23:37	1–1
	1–2	27:21 – P. Kontiola (S. Lepistö)
	1–3	36:00 – J. Aaltonen (J. Pesonen) (PP)
I. Kovalchuk (A. Tereshchenko, I. Nikulin) (EA) – 58:12	2–3

35 min
Penalties
41 min
36
Shots
24

11 May 2013; 12:15	United States	4–2 (2–0, 0–1, 2–1)	France	Hartwall Areena, Helsinki; Attendance: 7,458

Game reference

Ben Bishop
Goalies
Cristobal Huet
Referees:
(Germany) Lars Brüggemann
(Finland) Aleksi Rantala
Linesmen:
(Switzerland) Roger Arm
(Sweden) Johannes Käck

S. Gionta (M. Carle) – 07:08	1–0
B. Butler (D. LeBlanc, T. Stapleton) – 17:17	2–0
	2–1	28:24 – K. Hecquefeuille (P-É. Bellemare) (PP2)
P. Stastny (C. Smith, T. Stapleton) – 51:37	3–1
D. Moss (J. Faulk, J. McBain) (PP) – 53:23	4–1
	4–2	58:30 – Y. Treille (J. Desrosiers, L. Meunier)

8 min
Penalties
12 min
36
Shots
17

11 May 2013; 16:15	Finland	7–2 (2–0, 1–0, 4–2)	Austria	Hartwall Areena, Helsinki; Attendance: 12,121

Game reference

Joni Ortio
Goalies
Bernhard Starkbaum
Referees:
(Russia) Vyacheslav Bulanov
(Canada) Derek Zalaski
Linesmen:
(Czech Republic) Petr Blumel
(Germany) Sirko Hunnius

A. Pihlström (O. Väänänen, J. Jalasvaara) – 04:13	1–0
V-M. Savinainen (P. Kontiola, J. Aaltonen) – 08:18	2–0
P. Kontiola (S. Lepistö) (PP2) – 27:48	3–0
	3–1	40:38 – R. Lukas (T. Vanek) (SH)
	3–2	42:46 – R. Herburger (T. Hundertpfund) (SH)
L. Korpikoski (J. Koskiranta, T. Laakso) (PP) – 49:46	4–2
N. Hagman (J-P. Hytönen, M. Anttila) (PP) – 50:22	5–2
J. Koskiranta (L. Korpikoski) – 55:23	6–2
V-M. Savinainen (P. Kontiola, J. Aaltonen) (PP) – 57:21	7–2

4 min
Penalties
41 min
43
Shots
18

11 May 2013; 20:15	Germany	2–0 (0–0, 1–0, 1–0)	Latvia	Hartwall Areena, Helsinki; Attendance: 9,199

Game reference
Rob Zepp	Goalies	Kristers Gudļevskis	Referees: (United States) Ian Croft (Switzerland) Brent Reiber; Linesmen: (Norway) Jon Killian (Canada) Jesse Wilmot
C. Ulmann (P. Gogulla, M. Wolf) – 28:05 / 1–0; P. Hager (C. Erhoff, N. Goc) – 43:05 / 2–0			Referees: (United States) Ian Croft (Switzerland) Brent Reiber; Linesmen: (Norway) Jon Killian (Canada) Jesse Wilmot
10 min	Penalties	31 min	Referees: (United States) Ian Croft (Switzerland) Brent Reiber; Linesmen: (Norway) Jon Killian (Canada) Jesse Wilmot
34	Shots	26	Referees: (United States) Ian Croft (Switzerland) Brent Reiber; Linesmen: (Norway) Jon Killian (Canada) Jesse Wilmot

12 May 2013; 16:15	United States	3–0 (2–0, 0–0, 1–0)	Germany	Hartwall Areena, Helsinki; Attendance: 11,057

Game reference

John Gibson
Goalies
Dennis Endras
Referees:
(Russia) Vyacheslav Bulanov
(Russia) Konstantin Olenin
Linesmen:
(Czech Republic) Petr Blumel
(Belarus) Ivan Dedioulia

B. Butler (J. Faulk, C. Smith) (PP) – 02:39	1–0
P. Stastny (E. Johnson) – 04:53	2–0
S. Gionta (N. Thompson, M. Hunwick) – 51:27	3–0

12 min
Penalties
8 min
29
Shots
30

12 May 2013; 20:15	Slovakia	1–3 (0–0, 1–2, 0–1)	Russia	Hartwall Areena, Helsinki; Attendance: 4,041

Game reference

Jaroslav Janus
Goalies
Ilya Bryzgalov
Referees:
(Germany) Daniel Piechaczek
(Switzerland) Brent Reiber
Linesmen:
(Switzerland) Roger Arm
(Germany) Sirko Hunnius

	0–1	25:36 – A. Radulov (Y. Medvedev) (PP)
	0–2	31:44 – I. Kovalchuk (A. Radulov, A. Tereshchenko)
B. Radivojevič (SH) – 39:44	1–2
	1–3	44:48 – D. Denisov

10 min
Penalties
8 min
24
Shots
23

13 May 2013; 16:15	Latvia	3–1 (1–0, 1–0, 1–1)	France	Hartwall Areena, Helsinki; Attendance: 2,204

Game reference

Kristers Gudļevskis
Goalies
Cristobal Huet
Referees:
(Slovakia) Vladimír Baluška
(Germany) Lars Brüggemann
Linesmen:
(Sweden) Johannes Käck
(United States) Jonathan Morisson

M. Cipulis (J. Sprukts, R. Freibergs) (PP) – 14:52	1–0
J. Sprukts (M. Cipulis) – 25:07	2–0
	2–1	43:27 – J. Desrosiers (Y. Treille, K. Hecquefeuille)
L. Dārziņš (J. Sprukts) – 56:24	3–1

20 min
Penalties
6 min
26
Shots
30

13 May 2013; 20:15	Austria	4–8 (3–3, 1–3, 0–2)	Russia	Hartwall Areena, Helsinki; Attendance: 4,455

Game reference

Rene Swette
Bernhard Starkbaum
Goalies
Semyon Varlamov
Referees:
(United States) Ian Croft
(Finland) Aleksi Rantala
Linesmen:
(Norway) Jon Killian
(Canada) Jesse Wilmot

	0–1	01:25 – A. Perezhogin (S. Mozyakin, A. Popov)
	0–2	08:15 – I. Kovalchuk (A. Radulov)
M. Iberer (R. Lukas) – 08:53	1–2
T. Vanek (T. Pöck, M. Raffl) (PP) – 09:08	2–2
M. Raffl (T. Vanek, T. Hundertpfund) (PP) – 15:56	3–2
	3–3	18:32 – I. Nikulin (Y. Medvedev, I. Kovalchuk) (PP2)
	3–4	24:50 – A. Radulov (I. Kovalchuk) (PP)
F. Iberer (G. Baumgartner, M. Altmann) – 27:51	4–4
	4–5	31:07 – S. Mozyakin (I. Nikulin, A. Popov)
	4–6	37:19 – S. Soin (D. Kokarev) (SH)
	4–7	41:36 – N. Zaitsev (K. Petrov)
	4–8	49:38 – E. Kuznetsov (K. Petrov, A. Belov)

18 min
Penalties
12 min
36
Shots
18

14 May 2013; 12:15	Slovakia	4–1 (2–0, 1–1, 1–0)	United States	Hartwall Areena, Helsinki; Attendance: 9,262

Game reference

Rastislav Staňa
Goalies
Ben Bishop
Referees:
(Russia) Konstantin Olenin
(Finland) Aleksi Rantala
Linesmen:
(Belarus) Ivan Dedyulya
(Sweden) Johannes Käck

B. Radivojevič (T. Kopecký) – 00:15	1–0
M. Bartek (M. Šatan) – 03:44	2–0
R. Vydarený (T. Záborský, R. Kukumberg) (PP) – 30:48	3–0
	3–1	39:14 – D. Kristo (M. Carle)
M. Daňo (M. Šatan) (ENG) – 58:36	4–1

4 min
Penalties
20 min
26
Shots
21

14 May 2013; 16:15	France	2–3 OT (1–1, 1–0, 0–1) (OT 0–1)	Germany	Hartwall Areena, Helsinki; Attendance: 5,062

Game reference

Cristobal Huet
Goalies
Rob Zepp
Referees:
(Slovakia) Vladimír Baluška
(Switzerland) Brent Reiber
Linesmen:
(Czech Republic) Petr Blumel
(United States) Jonathan Morisson

J. Desrosiers (N. Besch, Y. Treille) (PP) – 01:42	1–0
	1–1	17:32 – C. Ehrhoff (C. Ullmann, T. Greilinger) (PP)
A. Roussel – 34:57	2–1
	2–2	41:24 – M. Wolf (F. Hördler)
	2–3	61:05 – C. Ehrhoff (M. Goc)

24 min
Penalties
4 min
29
Shots
36

14 May 2013; 20:15	Latvia	2–3 OT (1–1, 0–1, 1–0) (OT 0–1)	Finland	Hartwall Areena, Helsinki; Attendance: 12,289

Game reference

Kristers Gudlevskis
Goalies
Antti Rantta
Referees:
(Russia) Vyacheslav Bulanov
(Germany) Daniel Piechaczek
Linesmen:
(Switzerland) Roger Arm
(Germany) Sirko Hunnius

G. Meija (A. Džeriņš, K. Jass) – 08:19	1–0
	1–1	09:18 – S. Salminen (L. Korpikoski, T. Mäntylä)
	1–2	30:25 – M. Granlund (S. Salminen, T. Laakso)
R. Jekimovs (G. Meija, A. Džeriņš) – 56:13	2–2
	2–3	63:46 – A. Pihlström (V-M. Savinainen, T. Mäntylä)

16 min
Penalties
8 min
20
Shots
29

=== Group S ===
Pos	Team	Pld	W	OTW	OTL	L	GF	GA	GD	Pts	Qualification or relegation
1	Switzerland	7	6	1	0	0	29	10	+19	20	Advance to playoff round
2	Canada	7	5	1	1	0	25	10	+15	18	Advance to playoff round
3	Sweden	7	5	0	0	2	17	11	+6	15	Advance to playoff round
4	Czech Republic	7	3	1	0	3	19	12	+7	11	Advance to playoff round
5	Norway	7	3	0	0	4	12	26	−14	9	
6	Denmark	7	1	1	1	4	13	20	−7	6	
7	Belarus	7	1	0	0	6	10	21	−11	3	
8	Slovenia	7	0	0	2	5	12	27	−15	2	Relegated to Division I A

Source: IIHF

All times are local (UTC+2).

3 May 2013; 16:15	Czech Republic	2–0 (1–0, 0–0, 1–0)	Belarus	Ericsson Globe, Stockholm; Attendance: 5,127

Game reference
Alexander Salák	Goalies	Vitali Belinski	Referees: (United States) Keith Kaval (Germany) Daniel Piechaczek; Linesmen: (Germany) André Schrader (United States) Christopher Woodworth
J. Voráček (R. Vrbata, Z. Michálek) (PP2) – 11:03 / 1–0; R. Vrbata (M. Hanzal, L. Šmíd) (PP) – 49:57 / 2–0			Referees: (United States) Keith Kaval (Germany) Daniel Piechaczek; Linesmen: (Germany) André Schrader (United States) Christopher Woodworth
6 min	Penalties	14 min	Referees: (United States) Keith Kaval (Germany) Daniel Piechaczek; Linesmen: (Germany) André Schrader (United States) Christopher Woodworth
36	Shots	21	Referees: (United States) Keith Kaval (Germany) Daniel Piechaczek; Linesmen: (Germany) André Schrader (United States) Christopher Woodworth

3 May 2013; 20:15	Sweden	2–3 (0–0, 1–2, 1–1)	Switzerland	Ericsson Globe, Stockholm; Attendance: 12,500

Game reference

Jacob Markström
Goalies
Martin Gerber
Referees:
(United States) Ian Croft
(Finland) Jyri Rönn
Linesmen:
(Finland) Sakari Suominen
(Slovakia) Miroslav Valach

	0–1	22:52 – M. Bieber (J. Walker, E. Blum)
	0–2	28:17 – N. Niederreiter (M. Plüss)
J. Fransson (N. Danielsson, L. Eriksson) (PP2) – 38:10	1–2
	1–3	59:27 – R. Gardner (ENG)
S. Hjalmarsson (H. Tallinder) – 59:38	2–3

10 min
Penalties
14 min
31
Shots
24

4 May 2013; 12:15	Norway	3–1 (2–1, 0–0, 1–0)	Slovenia	Ericsson Globe, Stockholm; Attendance: 3,832

Game reference

Lars Haugen
Goalies
Robert Kristan
Referees:
(Slovakia) Vladimír Baluška
(United States) Keith Kaval
Linesmen:
(Sweden) Jimmy Dahmen
(France) Pierre Dehaen

A. Bastiansen (K A. Olimb) – 01:02	1–0
A. Bastiansen (M. Olimb, K A. Olimb) – 14:03	2–0
	2–1	19:43 – Ž. Jeglič (R. Tičar)
M. Hansen (K. Forsberg) (ENG) – 59:55	3–1

8 min
Penalties
10 min
25
Shots
22

4 May 2013; 16:15	Canada	3–1 (0–1, 2–0, 1–0)	Denmark	Ericsson Globe, Stockholm; Attendance: 5,577

Game reference

Devan Dubnyk
Goalies
Simon Nielsen
Referees:
(Germany) Lars Brüggemann
(Germany) Daniel Piechaczek
Linesmen:
(Russia) Sergei Shelyanin
(Finland) Sakari Suominen

	0–1	04:50 – M. Green (K. Staal, D. Nielsen) (PP)
M. Duchene (J. Eberle) – 30:15	1–1
S. Stamkos (E. Staal, C. Giroux) (PP) – 31:38	2–1
M. Duchene (J. Eberle) – 47:03	3–1

6 min
Penalties
12 min
37
Shots
25

4 May 2013; 20:15	Czech Republic	1–2 (0–1, 1–1, 0–0)	Sweden	Ericsson Globe, Stockholm; Attendance: 12,500

Game reference

Alexander Salák
Pavel Francouz
Goalies
Jhonas Enroth
Referees:
(Russia) Vyacheslav Bulanov
(Russia) Konstantin Olenin
Linesmen:
(Canada) Chris Carlson
(Germany) André Schrader

	0–1	10:14 – J. Ericsson (M. Thörnberg, C. Järnkrok)
	0–2	23:28 – H. Tallinder (J. Lundqvist, E. Gustafsson)
J. Hudler (J. Voráček, J.Tlustý) (PP) – 32:40	1–2

8 min
Penalties
20 min
18
Shots
39

5 May 2013; 12:15	Belarus	4–3 (1–1, 1–0, 2–2)	Slovenia	Ericsson Globe, Stockholm; Attendance: 1,411

Game reference

Vitali Belinski
Goalies
Robert Kristan
Referees:
(Germany) Lars Brüggemann
(Russia) Vyacheslav Bulanov
Linesmen:
(France) Pierre Dehaen
(Slovakia) Miroslav Valach

	0–1	13:28 – T. Razingar (R. Pajič, G. Kopitar)
I. Kaznadei (A. Kitarov, A. Kulakov) – 17:19	1–1
A. Kitarov (D. Meleshko) – 29:44	2–1
	2–2	41:06 – M. Rodman (D. Rodman)
A. Filichkin (A. Stas) (PP) – 43:57	3–2
	3–3	54:52 – R. Sabolič (Ž. Jeglič, R. Tičar) (PP)
A. Ugarov (I. Kaznadei, E. Kovyrshin) – 55:19	4–3

4 min
Penalties
6 min
17
Shots
30

5 May 2013; 16:15	Switzerland	3–2 GWS (1–0, 0–1, 1–1) (OT 0–0) (SO: 1–0)	Canada	Ericsson Globe, Stockholm; Attendance: 6,107

Game reference

Martin Gerber
Goalies
Mike Smith
Referees:
(Slovakia) Vladimír Baluška
(Russia) Konstantin Olenin
Linesmen:
(Russia) Sergei Shelyanin
(United States) Christopher Woodworth

D. Hollenstein (J. Walker, M. Trachsler) – 13:11	1–0
	1–1	34:33 – A. Ladd (L. Schenn, S. Stamkos)
	1–2	47:35 – M. Read (J. Eberle)
N. Niederreiter – 53:14	2–2

N. Niederreiter (miss)
R. Suri
R. Gardner (miss)
M. Plüss (miss)
A. Ambühl (miss)
D. Hollenstein (miss)
S. Bodenmann (miss)
R. Suri
Shootout
(miss) J. Eberle
(miss) C. Giroux
M. Duchene
(miss) S. Stamkos
(miss) M. Duchene
(miss) J. Eberle
(miss) M. Read
(miss) M. Duchene
6 min
Penalties
8 min
29
Shots
21

5 May 2013; 20:15	Norway	3–2 (1–0, 1–0, 1–2)	Denmark	Ericsson Globe, Stockholm; Attendance: 3,754

Game reference

Lars Haugen
Goalies
Patrick Galbraith
Referees:
(United States) Ian Croft
(Finland) Jyri Rönn
Linesmen:
(Canada) Chris Carlson
(Sweden) Jimmy Dahmen

M. Trygg (M. Olimb) – 01:03	1–0
A. Bastiansen (M. Ask, A. Bonsaksen) (EA) – 37:05	2–0
	2–1	45:09 – S. Lassen (Mi. Bødker, M. Christensen)
	2–2	49:58 – Ma. Bødker (Mi. Bødker, M. Christensen)
P. Thoresen (P-Å. Skrøder) – 57:28	3–2

14 min
Penalties
12 min
23
Shots
29

6 May 2013; 16:15	Switzerland	5–2 (1–0, 1–2, 3–0)	Czech Republic	Ericsson Globe, Stockholm; Attendance: 3,537

Game reference

Reto Berra
Goalies
Alexander Salák
Referees:
(United States) Ian Croft
(Finland) Jyri Rönn
Linesmen:
(Finland) Sakari Suominen
(United States) Christopher Woodworth

A. Ambühl (R. Gardner, R. Josi) (PP) – 17:56	1–0
N. Niederreiter (S. Moser, M. Plüss) – 26:36	2–0
	2–1	33:02 – J. Hudler (J. Tlustý, J. Voráček) (PP)
	2–2	39:12 – J. Hudler (Z. Irgl)
S. Moser (M. Plüss) – 45:47	3–2
S. Bodenmann (D. Hollenstein, L. Cunti) – 53:22	4–2
R. Suri (J. Walker, J. Vauclair) (ENG) – 59:21	5–2

6 min
Penalties
4 min
31
Shots
39

6 May 2013; 20:15	Sweden	2–1 (0–1, 1–0, 1–0)	Belarus	Ericsson Globe, Stockholm; Attendance: 10,473

Game reference

Jhonas Enroth
Goalies
Dmitri Milchakov
Referees:
(United States) Keith Kaval
(Germany) Daniel Piechaczek
Linesmen:
(Germany) André Schrader
(Slovakia) Miroslav Valach

	0–1	17:34 – K. Koltsov (O. Goroshko)
O. Lindberg (S. Kronwall) – 25:40	1–1
F. Pettersson (J. Lundqvist) – 51:36	2–1

12 min
Penalties
14 min
29
Shots
21

7 May 2013; 16:15	Slovenia	2–3 OT (1–0, 1–1, 0–1) (OT 0–1)	Denmark	Ericsson Globe, Stockholm; Attendance: 1,051

Game reference

Robert Kristan
Goalies
Simon Nielsen
Referees:
(Slovakia) Vladimír Baluška
(Russia) Konstantin Olenin
Linesmen:
(France) Pierre Dehaen
(Russia) Sergei Shelyanin

R. Tičar (B. Gregorc, M. Robar) – 06:11	1–0
	1–1	23:34 – K. Staal (M. Lauridsen, M. Madsen)
R. Tičar (M. Robar, B. Gregorc) (PP) – 34:41	2–1
	2–2	45:58 – M. Madsen (K. Staal, J. Jensen) (PP)
	2–3	61:53 – M. Green (P. Larsen)

4 min
Penalties
4 min
17
Shots
25

7 May 2013; 20:15	Canada	7–1 (4–0, 1–1, 2–0)	Norway	Ericsson Globe, Stockholm; Attendance: 3,678

Game reference

Devan Dubnyk
Goalies
Lars Volden
Referees:
(Germany) Lars Brüggemann
(Russia) Vyacheslav Bulanov
Linesmen:
(Sweden) Jimmy Dahmen
(Germany) André Schrader

A. Ladd (S. Stamkos) – 04:45	1–0
J. Skinner (S. Stamkos) – 13:07	2–0
M. Duchene (J. Eberle, S. Robidas) – 16:57	3–0
C. Giroux (J. Schultz, S. Stamkos) (PP) – 18:04	4–0
T. Hall (J. Eberle) – 22:28	5–0
	5–1	30:24 – K A. Olimb (A. Bastiansen, M. Olimb)
S. Stamkos (C. Giroux, T. Brodie) – 44:32	6–1
T. Hall (M. Duchene, R. O'Reilly) – 52:35	7–1

6 min
Penalties
12 min
36
Shots
14

8 May 2013; 16:15	Slovenia	1–7 (1–3, 0–3, 0–1)	Switzerland	Ericsson Globe, Stockholm; Attendance: 2,132

Game reference

Andrej Hočevar
Robert Kristan
Goalies
Martin Gerber
Referees:
(Czech Republic) Antonín Jeřábek
(United States) Keith Kaval
Linesmen:
(Canada) Chris Carlson
(Slovakia) Miroslav Valach

R. Pajič (Ž. Pavlin, K. Pretnar) – 06:13	1–0
	1–1	14:59 – S. Bodenmann (L. Cunti, D. Hollenstein)
	1–2	17:39 – L. Cunti (S. Bodenmann, D. Hollenstein) (PP)
	1–3	19:23 – D. Hollenstein (S. Bodenmann, L. Cunti) (PP)
	1–4	31:20 – D. Hollenstein (J. Vauclair, J. Walker)
	1–5	35:02 – S. Moser (M. Plüss, N. Niederreiter) (PP)
	1–6	39:53 – A. Ambühl (R. Suri)
	1–7	44:05 – R. Suri (A. Ambühl, R. Gardner)

8 min
Penalties
4 min
14
Shots
38

8 May 2013; 20:15	Norway	1–5 (0–2, 1–0, 0–3)	Sweden	Ericsson Globe, Stockholm; Attendance: 12,293

Game reference

Lars Haugen
Goalies
Jacob Markström
Referees:
(Slovakia) Vladimír Baluška
(Canada) Matt Kirk
Linesmen:
(France) Pierre Dehaen
(Finland) Sakari Suominen

	0–1	09:26 – G. Landeskog (D. Axelsson, J. Fransson)
	0–2	14:00 – L. Eriksson (N. Persson, D. Axelsson)
M. Holtet – 31:53	1–2
	1–3	44:11 – A. Jämtin (J. Fransson)
	1–4	44:59 – E. Fälth (D. Axelsson, N. Persson)
	1–5	56:33 – G. Landeskog (S. Hjalmarsson, L. Eriksson) (ENG)

16 min
Penalties
16 min
21
Shots
48

9 May 2013; 16:15	Czech Republic	2–1 GWS (0–0, 0–0, 1–1) (OT 0–0) (SO: 1–0)	Denmark	Ericsson Globe, Stockholm; Attendance: 3,359

Game reference
Ondřej Pavelec	Goalies	Simon Nielsen	Referees: (Sweden) Morgan Johansson (Germany) Daniel Piechaczek; Linesmen: (Canada) Chris Carlson (Sweden) Jimmy Dahmen
Z. Michálek (P. Hubáček, L. Šmíd) – 45:53 / 1–0; / 1–1 / 55:55 – M. Poulsen (K. Staal)			Referees: (Sweden) Morgan Johansson (Germany) Daniel Piechaczek; Linesmen: (Canada) Chris Carlson (Sweden) Jimmy Dahmen
J. Kovář (miss); R. Vrbata (miss); J. Hudler; J. Hudler (miss); Z. Irgl; Z. Irgl	Shootout	M. Bødker; (miss) K. Staal; (miss) M. Green; (miss) M. Bødker; M. Madsen; (miss) J. Jakobsen	Referees: (Sweden) Morgan Johansson (Germany) Daniel Piechaczek; Linesmen: (Canada) Chris Carlson (Sweden) Jimmy Dahmen
6 min	Penalties	14 min	Referees: (Sweden) Morgan Johansson (Germany) Daniel Piechaczek; Linesmen: (Canada) Chris Carlson (Sweden) Jimmy Dahmen
32	Shots	19	Referees: (Sweden) Morgan Johansson (Germany) Daniel Piechaczek; Linesmen: (Canada) Chris Carlson (Sweden) Jimmy Dahmen

9 May 2013; 20:15	Sweden	0–3 (0–1, 0–2, 0–0)	Canada	Ericsson Globe, Stockholm; Attendance: 12,500

Game reference

Jhonas Enroth
Jacob Markström
Goalies
Mike Smith
Referees:
(Russia) Konstantin Olenin
(Finland) Jyri Rönn
Linesmen:
(Russia) Sergei Shelyanin
(United States) Christopher Woodworth

0–1	08:56 – S. Stamkos (B. Campbell, J. Schultz) (PP)
0–2	20:55 – L. Schenn (M. Read, E. Staal)
0–3	33:00 – J. Staal (R. O'Reilly, M. Read)

8 min
Penalties
8 min
33
Shots
27

10 May 2013; 16:15	Slovenia	2–4 (2–2, 0–0, 0–2)	Czech Republic	Ericsson Globe, Stockholm; Attendance: 1,949

Game reference

Robert Kristan
Goalies
Ondřej Pavelec
Referees:
(Canada) Matt Kirk
(Russia) Konstantin Olenin
Linesmen:
(Finland) Sakari Suominen
(Slovakia) Miroslav Valach

	0–1	05:39 – P. Koukal (SH)
R. Sabolič (R. Tičar, B. Gregorc) (PP) – 06:21	1–1
R. Tičar (R. Sabolič) – 11:47	2–1
	2–2	19:17 – J. Hudler (J. Nakládal, J. Voráček) (PP)
	2–3	45:58 – Z. Michálek (J. Voráček) (PP)
	2–4	55:55 – J. Novotný (P. Hubáček, P. Čáslava) (PP)

10 min
Penalties
10 min
25
Shots
35

10 May 2013; 20:15	Belarus	1–4 (0–2, 0–1, 1–1)	Canada	Ericsson Globe, Stockholm; Attendance: 4,927

Game reference

Dmitri Milchakov
Goalies
Devan Dubnyk
Referees:
(Czech Republic) Antonín Jeřábek
(United States) Keith Kaval
Linesmen:
(France) Pierre Dehaen
(Germany) André Schrader

	0–1	11:17 – R. O'Reilly (J. Skinner, J. Staal)
	0–2	16:59 – A. Ladd (C. Giroux, J. Schultz) (PP)
	0–3	25:27 – S. Stamkos (C. Giroux, J. Schultz) (PP)
	0–4	42:35– C. Giroux (S. Stamkos, A. Ladd) (PP)
A. Yefimenko (A. Demkov) – 55:58	1–4

14 min
Penalties
8 min
10
Shots
37

11 May 2013; 12:15	Switzerland	4–1 (1–0, 1–1, 2–0)	Denmark	Ericsson Globe, Stockholm; Attendance: 3,543

Game reference

Reto Berra
Goalies
Patrick Galbraith
Referees:
(United States) Keith Kaval
(Canada) Matt Kirk
Linesmen:
(Sweden) Jimmy Dahmen
(Russia) Sergei Shelyanin

L. Cunti (S. Bodenmann, D. Hollenstein) (PP) – 01:55	1–0
R. Gardner (P. von Gunten, R. Josi) (PP) – 31:02	2–0
	2–1	33:54 – N. Jensen (S. Lassen)
R. Suri (R. Josi, A. Ambühl) – 43:47	3–1
N. Niederreiter (J. Vauclair, M. Seger) (PP) – 54:34	4–1

6 min
Penalties
8 min
27
Shots
33

11 May 2013; 16:15	Sweden	2–0 (0–0, 1–0, 1–0)	Slovenia	Ericsson Globe, Stockholm; Attendance: 12,500

Game reference
Jhonas Enroth	Goalies	Luka Gračnar	Referees: (Slovakia) Vladimír Baluška (Germany) Daniel Piechaczek; Linesmen: (France) Pierre Dehaen (Slovakia) Miroslav Valach
G. Landeskog (J. Fransson, P. Granberg) – 25:50 / 1–0; F. Pettersson (S. Hjalmarsson, J. Fransson) (PP) – 42:51 / 2–0			Referees: (Slovakia) Vladimír Baluška (Germany) Daniel Piechaczek; Linesmen: (France) Pierre Dehaen (Slovakia) Miroslav Valach
8 min	Penalties	12 min	Referees: (Slovakia) Vladimír Baluška (Germany) Daniel Piechaczek; Linesmen: (France) Pierre Dehaen (Slovakia) Miroslav Valach
40	Shots	21	Referees: (Slovakia) Vladimír Baluška (Germany) Daniel Piechaczek; Linesmen: (France) Pierre Dehaen (Slovakia) Miroslav Valach

11 May 2013; 20:15	Norway	3–1 (1–0, 1–0, 1–1)	Belarus	Ericsson Globe, Stockholm; Attendance: 3,115

Game reference

Lars Haugen
Goalies
Vitali Belinski
Referees:
(Sweden) Morgan Johansson
(Finland) Jyri Rönn
Linesmen:
(Canada) Chris Carlson
(United States) Christopher Woodworth

P-A Skrøder (M. Røymark, K. Forsberg) – 03:55	1–0
P-A Skrøder (M. Trygg, P. Thoresen) – 25:58	2–0
A. Bastiansen (K A. Olimb) (PP) – 54:18	3–0
	3–1	58:27 – A. Kulakov (Y. Solomonov)

25 min
Penalties
8 min
31
Shots
19

12 May 2013; 16:15	Canada	2–1 (1–1, 0–0, 1–0)	Czech Republic	Ericsson Globe, Stockholm; Attendance: 6,117

Game reference

Mike Smith
Goalies
Ondřej Pavelec
Referees:
(Sweden) Morgan Johansson
(Sweden) Marcus Vinnerborg
Linesmen:
(Germany) André Schrader
(Finland) Sakari Suominen

W. Simmonds (E. Staal, S. Robinas) (PP) – 11:01	1–0
	1–1	17:03 – P. Koukal (M. Hanzal, J. Hejda)
J. Skinner (M. Smith) – 46:55	2–1

29 min
Penalties
14 min
30
Shots
23

12 May 2013; 20:15	Norway	1–3 (0–2, 0–1, 1–0)	Switzerland	Ericsson Globe, Stockholm; Attendance: 3,226

Game reference

Lars Haugen
Goalies
Martin Gerber
Referees:
(Czech Republic) Martin Frano
(Canada) Derek Zalaski
Linesmen:
(Sweden) Jimmy Dahmen
(Russia) Sergei Shelyanin

	0–1	06:05 – S. Moser (M. Plüss, M. Seger)
	0–2	15:33 – R. Josi (A. Ambühl, R. Suri) (SH)
	0–3	39:35 – P. von Gunten (A. Ambühl, R. Josi) (PP)
O-K. Tollefsen (M. Trygg) (PP) – 44:14	1–3

22 min
Penalties
16 min
17
Shots
37

13 May 2013; 16:15	Denmark	3–2 (2–0, 1–2, 0–0)	Belarus	Ericsson Globe, Stockholm; Attendance: 537

Game reference

Simon Nielsen
Goalies
Dmitri Milchakov
Vitali Belinski
Referees:
(Canada) Matt Kirk
(Finland) Jyri Rönn
Linesmen:
(Canada) Chris Carlson
(United States) Christopher Woodworth

P. Larsen (K. Staal, N. Hardt) – 06:31	1–0
N. Jensen (Mi. Bødker, S. Lassen) – 14:57	2–0
M. Green (N. Hardt) (SH) – 27:03	3–0
	3–1	32:10 – K. Koltsov (O. Goroshko)
	3–2	36:36 – R. Graborenko (A. Stas, A. Ugarov)

6 min
Penalties
18 min
33
Shots
19

13 May 2013; 20:15	Canada	4–3 OT (0–2, 2–1, 1–0) (OT 1–0)	Slovenia	Ericsson Globe, Stockholm; Attendance: 2,184

Game reference

Devan Dubnyk
Goalies
Luka Gračnar
Referees:
(Czech Republic) Antonín Jeřábek
(United States) Keith Kaval
Linesmen:
(France) Pierre Dehaen
(Germany) André Schrader

	0–1	05:53 – J. Urbas (D. Rodman)
	0–2	08:36 – J. Urbas (D. Rodman)
M. Duchene (J. Harrison, J. Staal) – 22:01	1–2
S. Stamkos (J. Staal) – 22:51	2–2
	2–3	27:17 – T. Razingar (L. Tošić, R. Pajič)
B. Dillon (T. Hall, J. Skinner) – 47:09	3–3
S. Stamkos (D. Hamhuis, B. Campbell) – 63:36	4–3

4 min
Penalties
10 min
39
Shots
20

14 May 2013; 12:15	Belarus	1–4 (0–1, 0–0, 1–3)	Switzerland	Ericsson Globe, Stockholm; Attendance: 2,206

Game reference

Vitali Belinski
Goalies
Reto Berra
Referees:
(Czech Republic) Martin Fraňo
(Sweden) Marcus Vinnerborg
Linesmen:
(Slovakia) Miroslav Valach
(United States) Christopher Woodworth

	0–1	01:13 – R. Josi
Y. Kovyrshin (V. Andryushenko, I. Shinkevich) – 41:35	1–1
	1–2	50:59 – M. Bieber (R. Josi, R. Berra) (PP)
	1–3	54:00 – J. Walker (M. Bieber)
	1–4	59:02 – J. Walker (ENG)

6 min
Penalties
8 min
21
Shots
40

14 May 2013; 16:15	Czech Republic	7–0 (3–0, 2–0, 2–0)	Norway	Ericsson Globe, Stockholm; Attendance: 2,769

Game reference

Ondřej Pavelec
Pavel Francouz
Goalies
Lars Haugen
Lars Volden
Referees:
(Sweden) Morgan Johansson
(Finland) Jyri Rönn
Linesmen:
(Sweden) Jimmy Dahmen
(Russia) Sergei Shelyanin

T. Fleischmann (T. Plekanec) (PP) – 01:45	1–0
T. Fleischmann (T. Plekanec, J. Tlustý) – 07:18	2–0
J. Tlustý (T. Plekanec) – 11:27	3–0
M. Hanzal (J. Voráček, J. Hudler) (EA) – 27:56	4–0
Z. Michálek (L. Šmíd, P. Hubáček) – 39:59	5–0
R. Vrbata (M. Hanzal) – 53:11	6–0
Z. Irgl (J. Novotný, P. Hubáček) – 53:32	7–0

12 min
Penalties
4 min
36
Shots
17

14 May 2013; 20:15	Denmark	2–4 (1–0, 1–1, 0–3)	Sweden	Ericsson Globe, Stockholm; Attendance: 11,568

Game reference

Patrick Galbraith
Goalies
Jacob Markström
Referees:
(Czech Republic) Antonín Jeřábek
(Canada) Derek Zalaski
Linesmen:
(Sweden) Chris Carlson
(Finland) Sakari Suominen

M. Madsen (K. Starkov) – 07:40	1–0
	1–1	24:30 – D. Sedin (L. Eriksson, H. Sedin)
K. Starkov (M. Madsen, M. Green) (EA) – 36:04	2–1
	2–2	40:22 – H. Sedin (L. Eriksson, D. Sedin)
	2–3	41:36 – M. Thörnberg (O. Lindberg, F. Pettersson)
	2–4	50:45 – M. Thörnberg (F. Pettersson, A. Edler)

8 min
Penalties
16 min
28
Shots
41

== Playoff round ==
Quarterfinals
H1	Finland	4
H4	Slovakia	3
S2	Canada	2
S3	Sweden	3
S1	Switzerland	2
S4	Czech Republic	1
H2	Russia	3
H3	United States	8

Semifinals
H1	Finland	0
S3	Sweden	3
S1	Switzerland	3
H3	United States	0

Finals
S3	Sweden	5
S1	Switzerland	1
Bronze medal game
H1	Finland	2
H3	United States	3

=== Quarterfinals ===
The games in Stockholm are UTC+2, while the games in Helsinki are UTC+3.

16 May 2013; 13:00	Russia	3–8 (1–2, 0–2, 2–4)	United States	Hartwall Areena, Helsinki; Attendance: 5,506

Game reference

Ilya Bryzgalov
Semyon Varlamov
Goalies
John Gibson
Referees:
(Germany) Lars Brüggemann
(Switzerland) Brent Reiber
Linesmen:
(Switzerland) Roger Arm
(Canada) Jesse Wilmot

	0–1	11:53 – P. Stastny (C. Smith, M. Hunwick)
	0–2	12:43 – T. Oshie (T. Stapleton)
A. Svitov (S. Soin, F. Tyutin) – 15:30	1–2
	1–3	25:45 – N. Thompson (R. Carter)
	1–4	37:31 – A. Galchenyuk (C. Smith, P. Stastny)
A. Ovechkin (S. Varlamov) – 41:33	2–4
	2–5	42:55 – R. Carter (SH)
A. Perezhogin (A. Popov, A. Ovechkin) (PP) – 43:40	3–5
	3–6	48:11 – J. Trouba (C. Smith, P. Stastny) (PP)
	3–7	49:56 – D. Moss (C. Smith)
	3–8	50:07 – P. Stastny (C. Smith, C. Butler)

4 min
Penalties
8 min
34
Shots
31

16 May 2013; 14:45	Switzerland	2–1 (1–0, 1–0, 0–1)	Czech Republic	Ericsson Globe, Stockholm; Attendance: 2,237

Game reference

Martin Gerber
Goalies
Ondřej Pavelec
Referees:
(Russia) Konstantin Olenin
(Sweden) Marcus Vinnerborg
Linesmen:
(Sweden) Jimmy Dahmen
(Germany) André Schrader

D. Hollenstein (S. Blindenbacher, R. Suri) – 05:45	1–0
R. Josi (R. Gardner, R. Diaz) (PP) – 33:08	2–0
	2–1	45:29 – Z. Kutlák (T. Plekanec, J. Voráček) (PP)

12 min
Penalties
6 min
32
Shots
34

16 May 2013; 18:30	Finland	4–3 (3–0, 0–2, 1–1)	Slovakia	Hartwall Areena, Helsinki; Attendance: 9,520

Game reference

Antti Raanta
Goalies
Rastislav Staňa
Referees:
(Czech Republic) Antonín Jeřábek
(United States) Keith Kaval
Linesmen:
(Czech Republic) Petr Blumel
(United States) Jonathan Morisson

O. Väänänen – 01:31	1–0
P. Kontiola (J. Pesonen, J. Aaltonen) – 09:49	2–0
P. Kontiola (J. Aaltonen) – 15:44	3–0
	3–1	25:03 – M. Miklík (B. Mezei, R. Kukumberg)
	3–2	32:17 – A. Sekera (B. Mezei, L. Hudáček)
	3–3	40:30 – T. Surový (B. Radivojevič, B. Mezei)
J. Aaltonen (P. Kontiola, J. Pesonen) – 48:13	4–3

8 min
Penalties
10 min
25
Shots
36

16 May 2013; 20:15	Canada	2–3 GWS (0–0, 1–0, 1–2) (OT 0–0) (SO: 0–1)	Sweden	Ericsson Globe, Stockholm; Attendance: 11,153

Game reference

Mike Smith
Goalies
Jhonas Enroth
Jacob Markström
Referees:
(Russia) Vyacheslav Bulanov
(Finland) Jyri Rönn
Linesmen:
(France) Pierre Dehaen
(United States) Christopher Woodworth

S. Stamkos (S. Robidas, A. Ladd) (PP) – 20:45	1–0
	1–1	45:41 – N. Danielsson (H. Sedin, D. Sedin) (PP)
	1–2	49:35 – L. Eriksson (N. Danielsson, D. Sedin) (PP)
C. Giroux (A. Ladd) – 50:50	2–2

C. Giroux (miss)
J. Eberle
M. Duchene (miss)
J. Eberle (miss)
Shootout
L. Eriksson
(miss) H. Sedin
(miss) D. Sedin
F. Pettersson
8 min
Penalties
29 min
43
Shots
33

=== Semifinals ===
All times are local (UTC+2).

18 May 2013; 15:00	Finland	0–3 (0–1, 0–1, 0–1)	Sweden	Ericsson Globe, Stockholm; Attendance: 11,674

Game reference

Antti Raanta
Goalies
Jhonas Enroth
Referees:
(Russia) Konstantin Olenin
(Switzerland) Brent Reiber
Linesmen:
(Belarus) Ivan Dedyulya
(Canada) Jesse Wilmot

0–1	10:33 – L. Eriksson (H. Sedin, D. Sedin) (PP)
0–2	36:13 – L. Eriksson (H. Sedin, D. Sedin) (PP)
0–3	59:27 – H. Sedin (L. Eriksson, H. Tallinder) (ENG)

8 min
Penalties
4 min
30
Shots
31

18 May 2013; 19:00	Switzerland	3–0 (0–0, 1–0, 2–0)	United States	Ericsson Globe, Stockholm; Attendance: 7,136

Game reference

Reto Berra
Goalies
John Gibson
Referees:
(Germany) Lars Brüggemann
(Czech Republic) Antonín Jeřábek
Linesmen:
(Canada) Chris Carlson
(Finland) Sakari Suominen

N. Niederreiter (M. Plüss) – 30:01	1–0
J. Walker (S. Moser, P. Furrer) – 50:11	2–0
R. Suri (N. Niederreiter) (ENG) – 59:41	3–0

4 min
Penalties
8 min
31
Shots
29

=== Bronze medal game ===
Time is local (UTC+2).

19 May 2013; 16:00	Finland	2–3 GWS (0–2, 0–0, 2–0) (OT 0–0) (GWS 0–1)	United States	Ericsson Globe, Stockholm; Attendance: 6,836

Game reference

Antti Raanta
Goalies
John Gibson
Referees:
(Switzerland) Brent Reiber
(Sweden) Marcus Vinnerborg
Linesmen:
(Switzerland) Roger Arm
(Germany) André Schrader

	0–1	00:58 – C. Smith (P. Stastny, D. Moss)
	0–2	15:58 – P. Stastny (J. Trouba, C. Smith) (PP)
L. Korpikoski (O. Väänänen, M. Granlund) – 48:56	1–2
L. Korpikoski (M. Granlund, P. Kontiola) – 52:18	2–2

P. Kontiola (miss)
J. Pesonen
L. Korpikoski (miss)
M. Granlund (miss)
Shootout
(miss) C. Smith
(miss) T. Oshie
A. Galchenyuk
A. Galchenyuk
2 min
Penalties
0 min
38
Shots
26

=== Gold medal game ===
Time is local (UTC+2).

19 May 2013; 20:30	Switzerland	1–5 (1–2, 0–0, 0–3)	Sweden	Ericsson Globe, Stockholm; Attendance: 12,500

Game reference

Martin Gerber
Goalies
Jhonas Enroth
Referees:
(Czech Republic) Antonín Jeřábek
(Russia) Konstantin Olyenin
Linesmen:
(Belarus) Ivan Dedyulya
(Canada) Jesse Wilmot

R. Josi (J. Walker) – 04:45	1–0
	1–1	08:42 – E. Gustafsson (F. Pettersson, J. Lundqvist)
	1–2	11:38 – H. Sedin (PP)
	1–3	47:13 – S. Hjalmarsson (G. Landeskog)
	1–4	55:37 – L. Eriksson (H. Sedin)
	1–5	56:36 – H. Sedin (SH, ENG)

18 min
Penalties
6 min
27
Shots
27

== Ranking and statistics ==
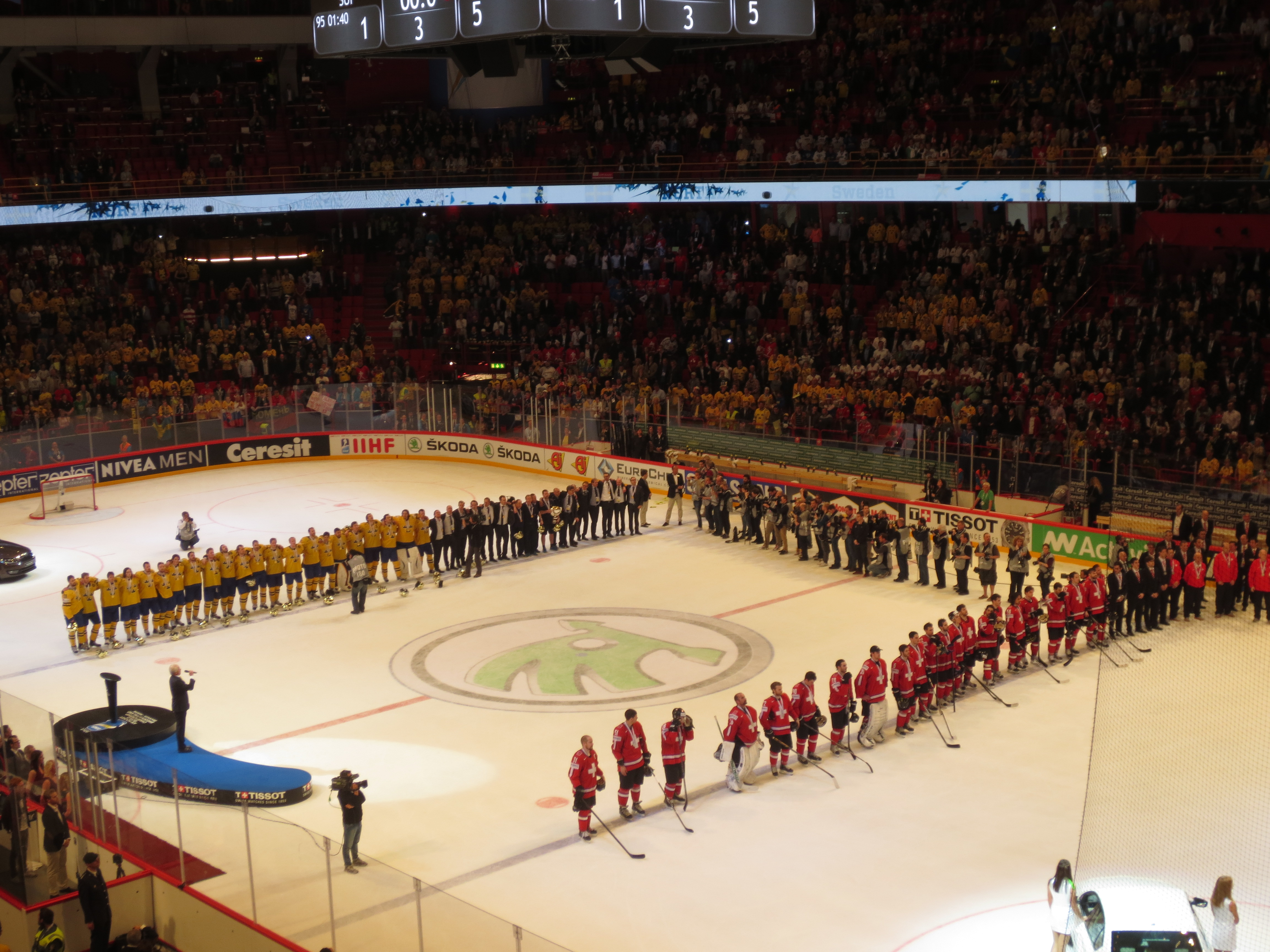
Players with their medals after the 2013 IIHF World Championship Final

=== Final ranking ===
Pos	Grp	Team	Pld	W	OTW	OTL	L	GF	GA	GD	Pts	Final result
1	S	Sweden (H)	10	7	1	0	2	28	14	+14	23	Champions
2	S	Switzerland	10	8	1	0	1	35	16	+19	26	Runners-up
3	H	United States	10	7	0	0	3	35	24	+11	21	Third place
4	H	Finland (H)	10	5	2	0	3	29	23	+6	19	Fourth place
5	S	Canada	8	5	1	1	1	27	13	+14	18	Eliminated in Quarter-finals
6	H	Russia	8	5	0	0	3	32	22	+10	15	Eliminated in Quarter-finals
7	S	Czech Republic	8	3	1	0	4	20	14	+6	11	Eliminated in Quarter-finals
8	H	Slovakia	8	3	0	1	4	21	21	0	10	Eliminated in Quarter-finals
9	H	Germany	7	2	1	1	3	13	16	−3	9	Eliminated in Group stage
10	S	Norway	7	3	0	0	4	12	26	−14	9	Eliminated in Group stage
11	H	Latvia	7	2	0	1	4	14	25	−11	7	Eliminated in Group stage
12	S	Denmark	7	1	1	1	4	13	20	−7	6	Eliminated in Group stage
13	H	France	7	2	0	1	4	13	21	−8	7	Eliminated in Group stage
14	S	Belarus	7	1	0	0	6	10	21	−11	3	Eliminated in Group stage
15	H	Austria	7	1	1	0	5	18	29	−11	5	2014 IIHF World Championship Division I
16	S	Slovenia	7	0	0	2	5	12	27	−15	2	2014 IIHF World Championship Division I

Source: IIHF
(H) Host

2013 IIHF World Championship winners

Sweden
9th title

=== Tournament awards ===
Best players selected by the directorate:

- Best Goaltender: (Sweden) Jhonas Enroth
- Best Defenceman: (Switzerland) Roman Josi
- Best Forward: (Finland) Petri Kontiola
- Most Valuable Player: (Switzerland) Roman Josi

Media All-Star Team:

- Goaltender: (Sweden) Jhonas Enroth
- Defence: (Switzerland) Roman Josi, (Switzerland) Julien Vauclair
- Forwards: (Finland) Petri Kontiola, (Sweden) Henrik Sedin, (United States) Paul Stastny

=== Scoring leaders ===
List shows the top skaters sorted by points, then goals.

Player	GP	G	A	Pts	+/−	PIM	POS
(Finland) Petri Kontiola	10	8	8	16	+6	8	F
(United States) Paul Stastny	10	7	8	15	+7	6	F
(United States) Craig Smith	10	4	10	14	+5	18	F
(Russia) Ilya Kovalchuk	8	8	5	13	+5	29	F
(Canada) Steven Stamkos	8	7	5	12	+6	6	F
(Finland) Juhamatti Aaltonen	10	4	7	11	+3	4	F
(Russia) Alexander Radulov	8	5	5	10	+4	4	F
(Sweden) Loui Eriksson	10	5	5	10	+4	0	F
(Sweden) Henrik Sedin	4	4	5	9	+4	2	F
(Switzerland) Roman Josi	10	4	5	9	+2	4	D

GP = Games played; G = Goals; A = Assists; Pts = Points; +/− = Plus/minus; PIM = Penalties in minutes; POS = Position
Source: IIHF.com

=== Leading goaltenders ===
Only the top ten goaltenders, based on save percentage, who have played at least 40% of their team's minutes, are included in this list.

Player	TOI	GA	GAA	SA	Sv%	SO
(Sweden) Jhonas Enroth	418:29	8	1.15	183	95.63	2
(United States) John Gibson	308:00	8	1.56	164	95.12	1
(Canada) Mike Smith	255:00	7	1.65	126	94.44	1
(Germany) Rob Zepp	302:05	9	1.79	153	94.12	2
(Czech Republic) Ondřej Pavelec	296:36	7	1.42	112	93.75	1
(Finland) Antti Raanta	430:15	15	2.09	208	92.79	1
(Belarus) Vitali Belinski	269:46	11	2.45	147	92.52	0
(Latvia) Kristers Gudlevskis	243:46	9	2.22	120	92.50	0
(Switzerland) Martin Gerber	364:51	11	1.81	143	92.31	0
(Norway) Lars Haugen	310:57	14	2.70	164	91.46	0

TOI = Time on ice (minutes:seconds); SA = Shots against; GA = Goals against; GAA = Goals against average; Sv% = Save percentage; SO = Shutouts
Source: "IIHF.com" (PDF). IIHF. Archived (PDF) from the original on 15 April 2023.

== IIHF honors and awards ==
The 2013 IIHF Hall of Fame induction ceremony has held in Stockholm during the World Championships. Gord Miller of Canada was given the Paul Loicq Award for outstanding contributions to international ice hockey. The IIHF Milestone Award was given to the 1954 Soviet Union men's national team.

IIHF Hall of Fame inductees

- Jan-Åke Edvinsson, Sweden
- Peter Forsberg, Sweden
- Danielle Goyette, Canada
- Paul Henderson, Canada
- Teppo Numminen, Finland
- Mats Sundin, Sweden
