= Vitali Belinski =

Belarusian ice hockey player

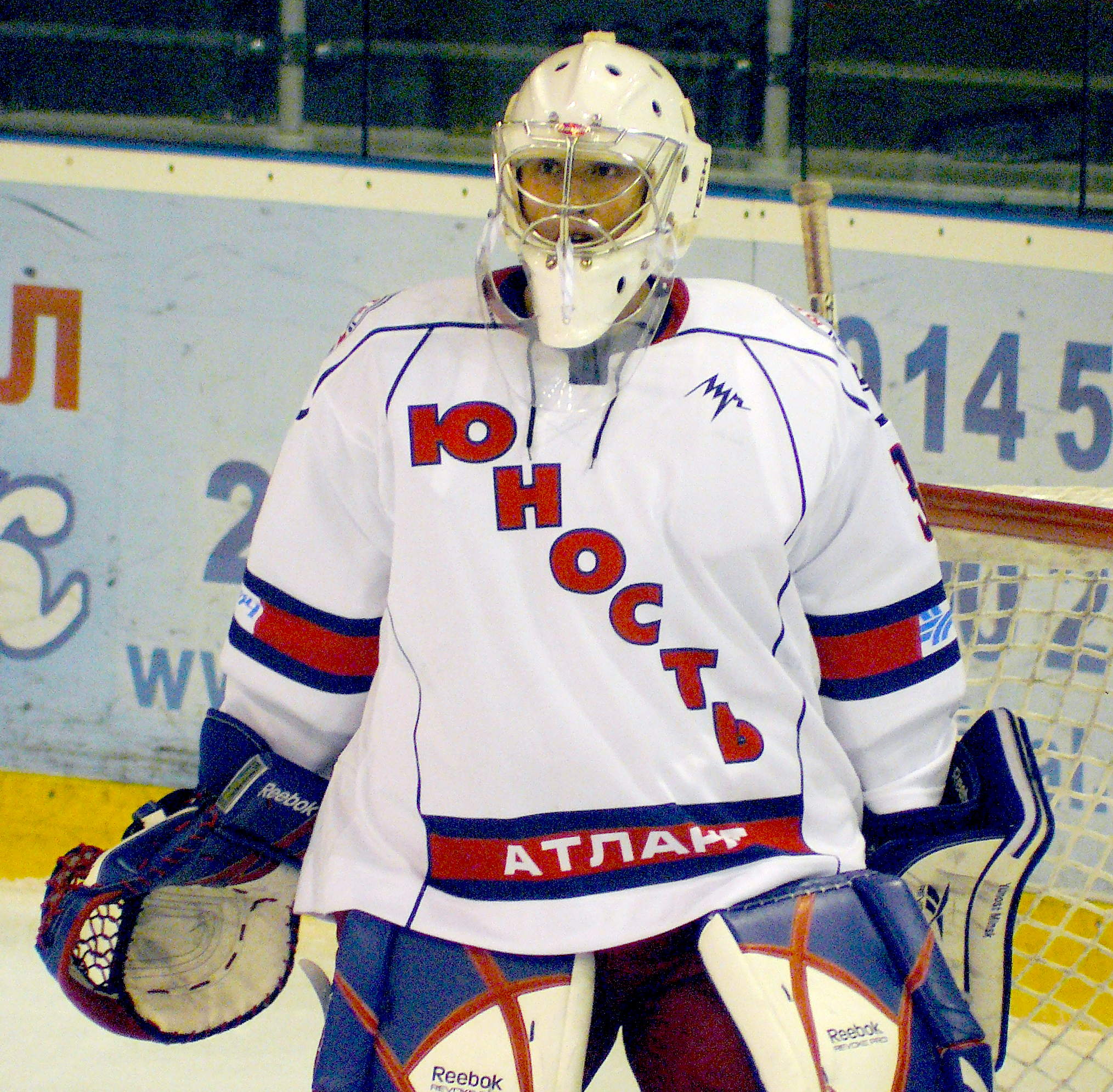
- Born: November 27, 1989 (age 36) Minsk, Soviet Union
- Height: 5 ft 7 in (170 cm)
- Weight: 174 lb (79 kg; 12 st 6 lb)
- Position: Goaltender
- Catches: Right
- BHL team Former teams: HK Mogilev; Yunost Minsk; HC Shinnik Bobruisk; HK Vitebsk; HC Dynama-Maladzechna; Metallurg Zhlobin
- National team: Belarus
- Playing career: 2005–present

Vitali Vladimirovich Belinski (sometimes Vitaly Belinsky; Belarusian: Віталь Уладзіміравіч Бялінскі — Vital' Uladzimiravich Bialinski; Russian: Виталий Владимирович Белинский; born November 27, 1989) is a professional ice hockey goaltender from Belarus who currently plays for HK Mogilev in the Belarusian Extraleague.

Belinski began playing hockey at age seven at the Yunost-Minsk hockey school. Throughout his career, he mostly played for various teams within the Yunost-Minsk system—including Yunior, Yunost-MHL, and Yunost-Minsk, except for the 2008–2009 and 2011–2012 seasons, when he played for HC Shinnik Bobruisk and HK Vitebsk, respectively. In the 2012–2013 season, Yunost-Minsk competed in the Higher Hockey League, where Belinski shared the primary goaltender role with Canadian-Belarusian Kevin Lalande. That season, he appeared in 22 games, achieving a 91.8% save percentage (56 saves on 586 shots), a 2.53 goals against average, and recorded three shutouts. On October 2, 2012, he was recognized as the league's best goaltender for the week.

He represented Belarus at the junior level, playing for both the under-18 and under-20 national teams. His first appearance with the senior Belarusian national team occurred on April 6, 2013, when he competed in a match against Germany. Later that year, he earned a spot on Belarus' roster for the 2013 IIHF World Championship. Despite being one of the smallest players at the tournament, measuring only 170 cm tall, he contributed to his team's efforts on the international stage.
