= Oleg Goroshko =

Belarusian ice hockey player

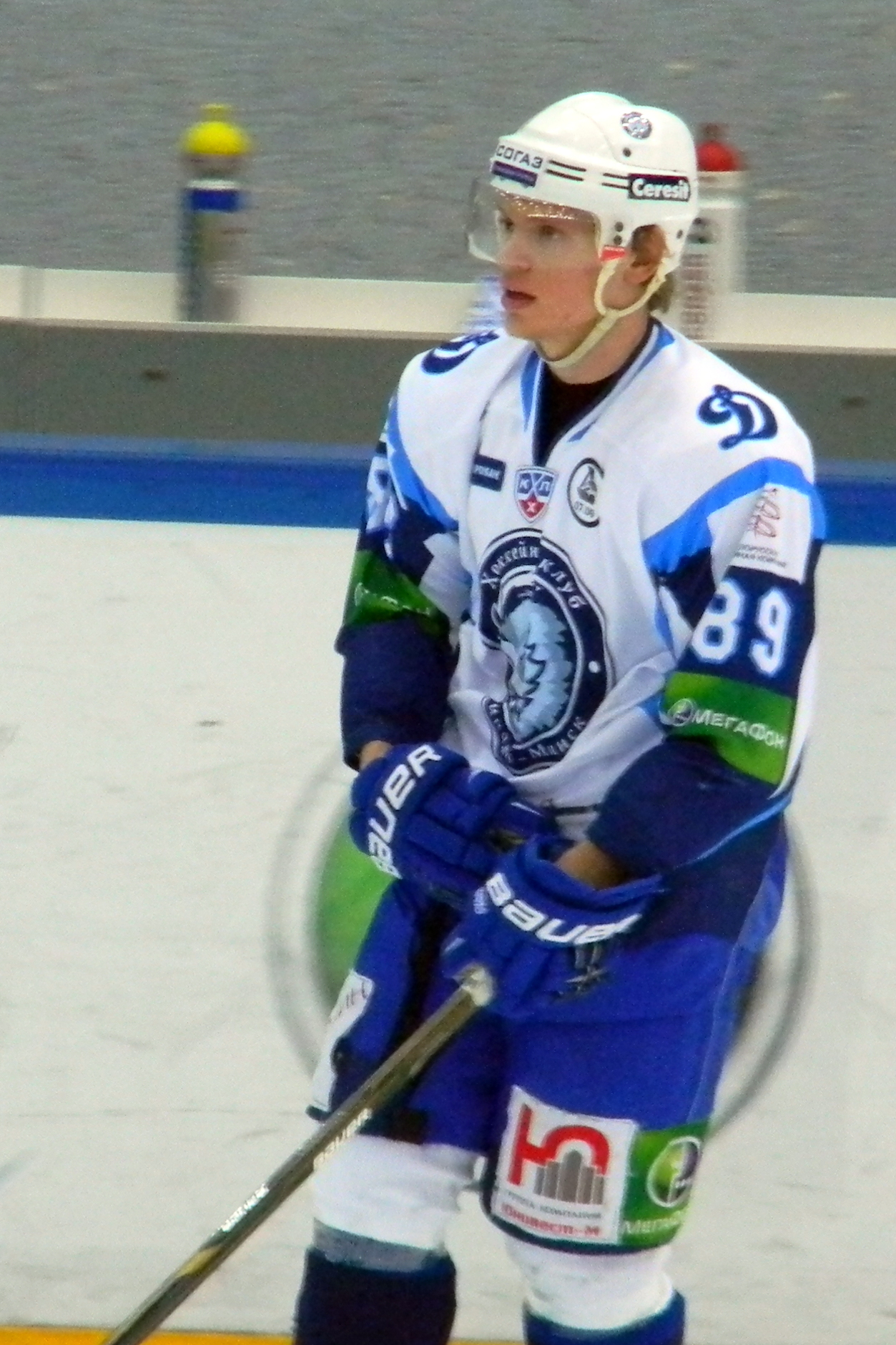
- Born: November 19, 1989 (age 35); Grodno, Byelorussian SSR, Soviet Union
- Height: 5 ft 10 in (178 cm)
- Weight: 185 lb (84 kg; 13 st 3 lb)
- Position: Defence
- Shoots: Right
- KHL team Former teams: HC Dinamo Minsk; HK Neman Grodno
- National team: Belarus
- NHL draft: Undrafted
- Playing career: 2008–present

Oleg Goroshko (born November 19, 1989) is a Belarusian professional ice hockey player who is currently playing for HC Dinamo Minsk in the Kontinental Hockey League (KHL).

He participated in the 2011 IIHF World Championship as a member of the Belarus men's national ice hockey team.

== Career statistics ==
			Regular season					Playoffs
Season	Team	League	GP	G	A	Pts	PIM	GP	G	A	Pts	PIM
2004–05	HK Gomel-2	Belarus Vysshaya	10	1	0	1	6	—	—	—	—	—
2005–06	HK Gomel-2	Belarus Vysshaya	43	3	8	11	38	—	—	—	—	—
2006–07	HK Gomel-2	Belarus Vysshaya	51	2	12	14	93	—	—	—	—	—
2007–08	HK Gomel-2	Belarus Vysshaya	54	4	13	17	81	—	—	—	—	—
2008–09	Shinnik Bobruisk	Belarus	43	1	7	8	24	—	—	—	—	—
2009–10	HK Neman Grodno	Belarus	51	2	4	6	22	3	0	0	0	2
2009–10	HK Neman Grodno-2	Belarus Vysshaya	11	3	9	12	25	—	—	—	—	—
2010–11	HK Neman Grodno	Belarus	51	3	4	7	55	11	0	0	0	8
2011–12	HC Dynamo Minsk	KHL	21	0	1	1	24	1	0	0	0	0
2011–12	HK Neman Grodno	Belarus	4	0	0	0	0	—	—	—	—	—
2012–13	HC Dynamo Minsk	KHL	27	0	2	2	6	—	—	—	—	—
2012–13	Yunost Minsk	VHL	3	0	1	1	2	—	—	—	—	—
2013–14	HC Dynamo Minsk	KHL	45	1	4	5	22	—	—	—	—	—
2014–15	HC Dynamo Minsk	KHL	58	2	3	5	20	5	0	0	0	2
2015–16	HC Dynamo Minsk	KHL	21	1	0	1	10	—	—	—	—	—
2016–17	Yunost Minsk	Belarus	36	2	8	10	10	13	0	2	2	10
2017–18	Yunost Minsk	Belarus	30	0	6	6	8	10	0	2	2	12
2018–19	Dinamo-Molodechno	Belarus	51	2	6	8	26	13	1	1	2	37
2019–20	Lokomotiv Orsha	Belarus2	27	2	6	8	42	25	0	3	3	4
2019–20	Lokomotiv Orsha	Belarus	—	—	—	—	—	6	0	1	1	6
2020–21	Lokomotiv Orsha	Belarus	37	2	3	5	18	2	0	1	1	2
2021–22	Metallurg Zhlobin	Belarus	44	0	5	5	46	15	0	2	2	12
KHL totals			172	4	10	14	82	6	0	0	0	2
Belarus totals			347	12	43	55	209	73	1	9	10	89
