= Ryan Gardner =

Swiss ice hockey player (born 1978)

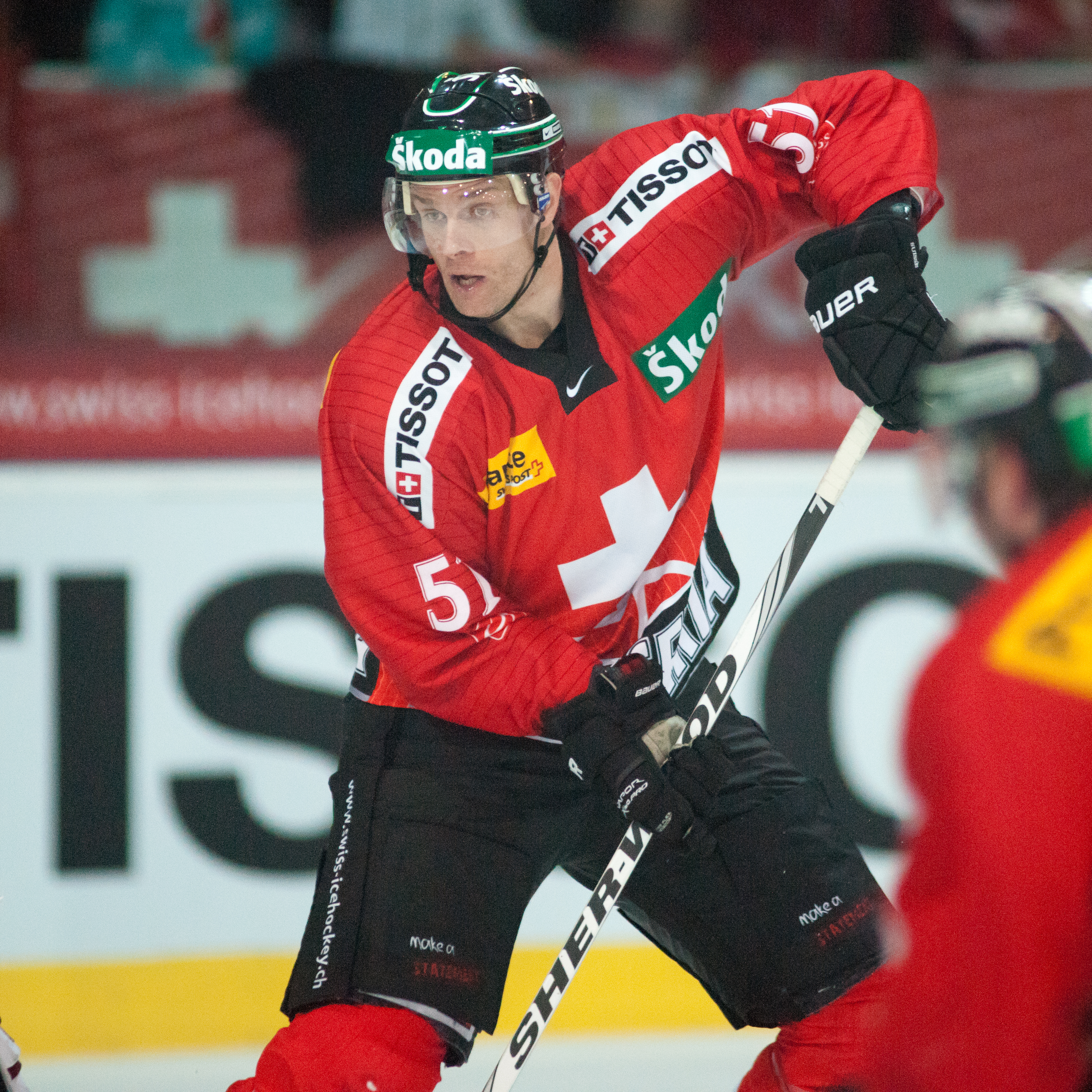
- Born: April 18, 1978 (age 48) Akron, Ohio, United States
- Height: 6 ft 6 in (198 cm)
- Weight: 220 lb (100 kg; 15 st 10 lb)
- Position: Right wing/Centre
- Shot: Right
- Played for: HC Ambrì-Piotta; Lausanne HC; HC Sierre-Anniviers; HC Lugano; ZSC Lions; SC Bern; HC Fribourg-Gottéron
- National team: Switzerland
- NHL draft: Undrafted
- Playing career: 1998–2018

Ryan Gardner (born April 18, 1978) is a Canadian-born Swiss former professional ice hockey forward. He last played for HC Lugano, Fribourg-Gottéron, SC Bern, ZSC Lions and HC Ambrì-Piotta in the National League (NL). He won the Swiss national championship four times. Representing the Swiss national team, he captured a silver medal at the 2013 World Championships. Gardner was born in Akron, Ohio during his father's time with the Cleveland Barons, but grew up in Switzerland in the 1980s and then Aurora, Ontario (late 1980s and 1990s).

== Career ==
While his father Dave Gardner was playing professionally in Switzerland, Gardner played in the country as a youngster. Later, he spent time with the London Knights and North Bay Centenntials in the OHL, before moving back to Switzerland. He made his debut in the top-flight National League A (NLA) at HC Ambrì-Piotta during the 1997-98 season.

In 2001, he signed with HC Lugano, where he stayed until 2007. During his time in Lugano, he captured the 2003 and 2006 Swiss championships. He then spent three years with the ZSC Lions, winning the NLA title in 2008 and the 2008-09 Champions Hockey League. From 2010 to 2015, he turned out for SC Bern, winning another championship in 2013 and the Swiss cup competition in 2015.

After the 2014–15 season, on April 2, 2015, Gardner was traded by SC Bern to HC Fribourg-Gottéron in exchange for Timo Helbling. In April 2016, he signed a deal to return to HC Lugano, where he played until the conclusion of the 2016-17.

Gardner announced his retirement from professional ice hockey in February 2018.

== International career ==
Gardner has represented Switzerland internationally at the IIHF World Championships and 2014 Winter Olympics. He won silver with the Swiss team at the 2013 World Championships.

== Personal info ==
He comes from a hockey family: His father Dave Gardner, uncle Paul Gardner and grandfather Cal Gardner all played professionally.

== Career statistics ==
=== Regular season and playoffs ===
			Regular season					Playoffs
Season	Team	League	GP	G	A	Pts	PIM	GP	G	A	Pts	PIM
1994–95	Toronto Marlboros AAA	GTHL U18	—	—	—	—	—	—	—	—	—	—
1995–96	London Knights	OHL	61	4	10	14	24	—	—	—	—	—
1996–97	London Knights	OHL	19	1	3	4	14	—	—	—	—	—
1996–97	North Bay Centennials	OHL	47	7	6	13	35	—	—	—	—	—
1997–98	North Bay Centennials	OHL	9	0	2	2	2	—	—	—	—	—
1997–98	HC Ambrì–Piotta	SUI U20	19	13	11	24	50	—	—	—	—	—
1997–98	HC Ambrì–Piotta	NDA	5	0	0	0	0	9	0	1	1	12
1997–98	EHC Leukerbad	SUI.3	5	1	2	3	—	—	—	—	—	—
1997–98	Lausanne HC	SUI.2	1	0	0	0	0	—	—	—	—	—
1998–99	HC Ambrì–Piotta	NLA	40	9	4	13	8	15	3	7	10	2
1998–99	HC Sierre	SUI.2	6	0	1	1	25	—	—	—	—	—
1999–2000	HC Ambrì–Piotta	NLA	45	11	17	28	16	9	4	3	7	2
2000–01	HC Ambrì–Piotta	NLA	43	10	12	22	47	—	—	—	—	—
2001–02	HC Lugano	NLA	39	9	8	17	6	13	0	1	1	2
2002–03	HC Lugano	NLA	36	7	13	20	47	16	5	6	11	10
2003–04	HC Lugano	NLA	48	17	23	40	40	16	5	6	11	12
2004–05	HC Lugano	NLA	44	24	22	46	24	5	0	2	2	4
2005–06	HC Lugano	NLA	40	15	27	42	36	17	8	7	15	18
2006–07	HC Lugano	NLA	44	5	22	27	26	6	2	4	6	6
2007–08	ZSC Lions	NLA	35	17	14	31	16	17	8	9	17	6
2008–09	ZSC Lions	NLA	50	25	28	53	28	4	1	0	1	2
2009–10	ZSC Lions	NLA	49	16	26	42	28	7	1	1	2	0
2010–11	SC Bern	NLA	49	15	20	35	34	11	1	10	11	2
2011–12	SC Bern	NLA	49	11	21	32	10	17	4	6	10	2
2012–13	SC Bern	NLA	50	25	17	42	26	18	7	8	15	25
2013–14	SC Bern	NLA	48	9	21	30	12	—	—	—	—	—
2014–15	SC Bern	NLA	44	9	15	24	24	11	1	0	1	2
2015–16	HC Fribourg–Gottéron	NLA	50	8	14	22	8	5	0	1	1	0
2016–17	HC Lugano	NLA	49	7	7	14	39	11	2	0	2	2
NLA totals			857	249	331	580	475	207	52	72	124	109

Medal record

Men's Ice hockey

Representing Switzerland

World Championships
Silver medal – second place	2013 Sweden/Finland	

=== International ===
Year	Team	Event	Result	GP	G	A	Pts	PIM
2009	Switzerland	WC	9th	5	1	0	1	0
2011	Switzerland	WC	9th	6	3	2	5	2
2013	Switzerland	WC	2nd place, silver medalist(s)	10	2	3	5	0
2014	Switzerland	OG	9th	3	0	0	0	0
Senior totals				24	6	5	11	2
