= Luka Tošić =

Slovenian ice hockey player

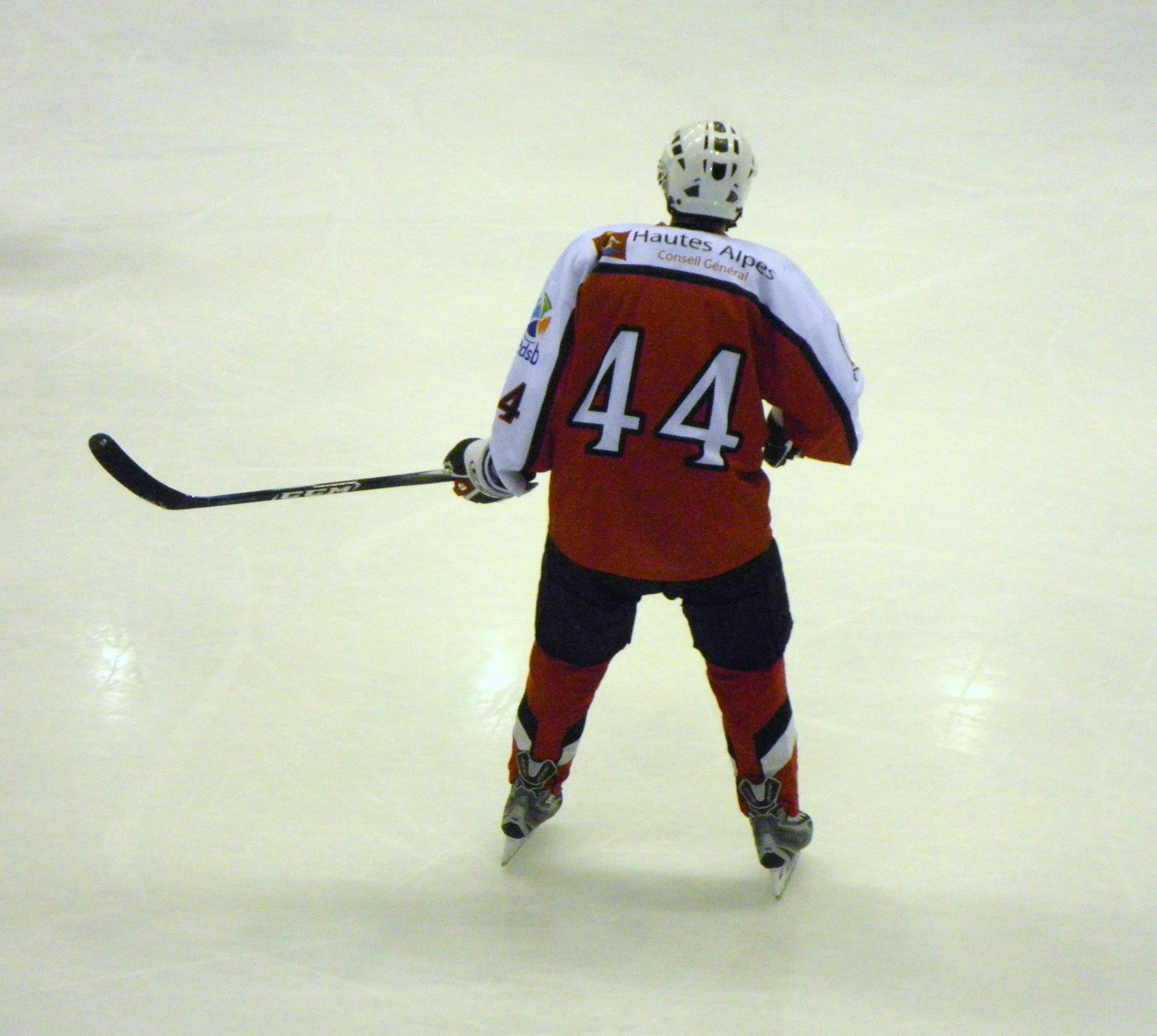
- Born: March 10, 1988 (age 37); Jesenice, Slovenia
- Height: 6 ft 0 in (183 cm)
- Weight: 176 lb (80 kg; 12 st 8 lb)
- Position: Defense
- Shoots: Left
- AlpsHL team: HDD Jesenice
- National team: Slovenia
- Playing career: 2005–present

Luka Tošić (born March 10, 1988) is a Slovenian ice hockey player who is currently playing for HDD Jesenice of the Alps Hockey League.

Tošić competed in the 2013 IIHF World Championship as a member of the Slovenia men's national ice hockey team.
