= David Schuller =

Austrian ice hockey player

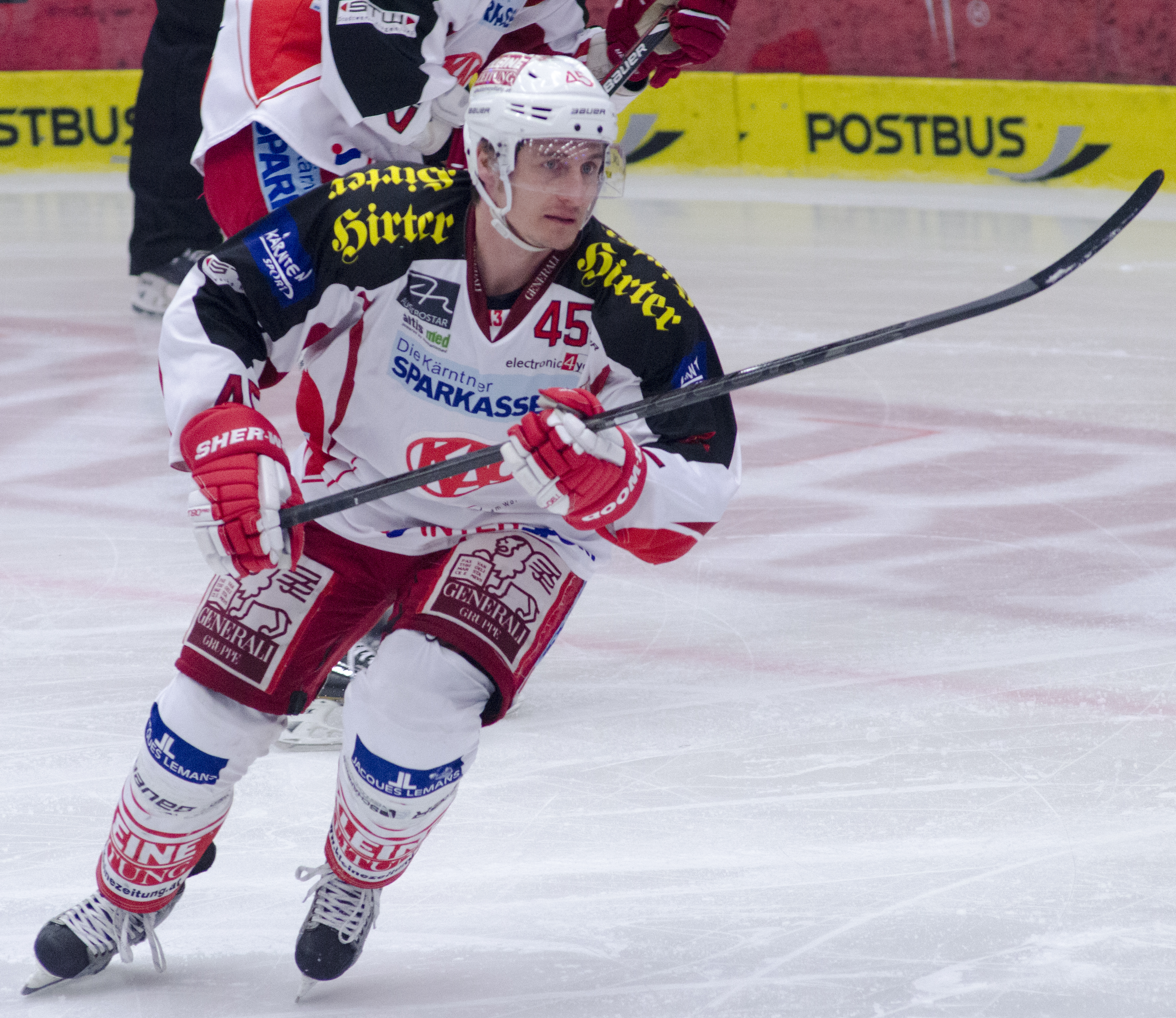
- Born: September 6, 1980 (age 45) Kapfenberg, Austria
- Height: 6 ft 0 in (183 cm)
- Weight: 201 lb (91 kg; 14 st 5 lb)
- Position: Forward
- Shoots: Left
- EBEL team Former teams: Free Agent; Kapfenberger SV; EC KAC; Vienna Capitals; HC TWK Innsbruck
- National team: Austria
- Playing career: 2000–present

David Schuller (born September 6, 1980) is an Austrian ice hockey player who is currently an unrestricted free agent who most recently played for HC TWK Innsbruck of the Austrian Hockey League (EBEL). On June 13, 2015, he joined Innsbruck after spending the majority of his career with EC KAC, agreeing to a one-year deal.

Schuller competed in the 2013 IIHF World Championship as a member of the Austria men's national ice hockey team.
