= Matthias Iberer =

Austrian ice hockey player

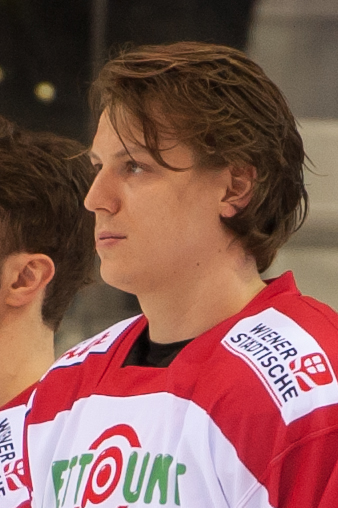
- Born: April 29, 1985 (age 40) Graz, Austria
- Height: 6 ft 2 in (188 cm)
- Weight: 201 lb (91 kg; 14 st 5 lb)
- Position: Right wing
- Shot: Left
- Played for: Graz 99ers Kalamazoo Wings; EHC Black Wings Linz
- National team: Austria
- NHL draft: Undrafted
- Playing career: 2001–2015

Matthias Iberer (born April 29, 1985) is an Austrian former professional ice hockey player who ended his career playing for EHC Black Wings Linz of the Austrian Hockey League (EBEL). He has formerly played with fellow Austrian club, Graz 99ers of the EBEL

Having suffered a broken back in November 2014, Iberer returned to play out the 2014–15 season before ending his professional career on April 2, 2015.

Iberer competed in the 2013 IIHF World Championship as a member of the Austria men's national ice hockey team, he finished with 35 National team appearances.

== Career statistics ==
=== Regular season and playoffs ===
			Regular season					Playoffs
Season	Team	League	GP	G	A	Pts	PIM	GP	G	A	Pts	PIM
2000–01	Graz99ers	AUT	1	0	0	0	0	—	—	—	—	—
2001–02	Graz99ers	AUT U20	19	19	19	38	58	—	—	—	—	—
2001–02	Graz99ers	AUT	4	0	0	0	0	—	—	—	—	—
2002–03	Graz99ers	AUT U20	27	27	11	38	95	—	—	—	—	—
2002–03	Graz99ers	AUT	15	0	0	0	2	3	0	0	0	0
2003–04	Graz99ers	AUT	41	2	1	3	26	3	0	0	0	0
2004–05	Graz99ers	AUT U20	11	11	7	18	43	—	—	—	—	—
2004–05	Graz99ers	AUT	38	1	0	1	44	—	—	—	—	—
2005–06	Fairbanks Ice Dogs	NAHL	55	16	13	29	68	9	0	0	0	22
2006–07	Graz99ers	AUT	46	6	4	10	84	—	—	—	—	—
2007–08	Kalamazoo Wings	IHL	3	1	0	1	0	—	—	—	—	—
2007–08	EHC Liwest Black Wings Linz	AUT	6	2	1	3	4	8	0	0	0	29
2008–09	EHC Liwest Black Wings Linz	AUT	50	12	13	25	120	7	2	1	3	2
2009–10	EHC Liwest Black Wings Linz	AUT	53	11	12	23	24	18	3	2	5	2
2010–11	Graz99ers	AUT	54	13	19	32	56	4	0	0	0	0
2011–12	Graz99ers	AUT	48	12	12	24	66	—	—	—	—	—
2012–13	Graz99ers	AUT	54	18	19	37	86	5	0	2	2	0
2013–14	EHC Liwest Black Wings Linz	AUT	46	12	8	20	39	8	0	2	2	14
2014–15	EHC Liwest Black Wings Linz	AUT	42	16	8	24	61	12	0	3	3	18
2017–18	ATSE Graz	AUT.4	6	3	4	7	18	1	0	0	0	2
2019–20	EC Frohnleiten	AUT.4	2	0	3	3	0	—	—	—	—	—
AUT totals			478	105	97	202	610	65	5	10	15	65

=== International ===
Year	Team	Event	GP	G	A	Pts	PIM
2002	Austria	WJC18 D1	3	1	0	1	2
2004	Austria	WJC	6	0	0	0	2
2013	Austria	OGQ	3	0	0	0	4
2013	Austria	WC	7	1	1	2	0
2014	Austria	OG	2	0	0	0	0
2014	Austria	WC D1A	5	1	0	1	6
Junior totals			14	1	0	1	8
Senior totals			17	2	1	3	10
