= Sergei Soin =

- Born: March 31, 1982 (age 44) Moscow, Soviet Union
- Height: 6 ft 0 in (183 cm)
- Weight: 185 lb (84 kg; 13 st 3 lb)
- Position: Center
- Shot: Left
- Played for: Krylya Sovetov Moscow; CSKA Moscow; Severstal Cherepovets; Dynamo Moscow; Salavat Yulaev Ufa; Lada Togliatti
- National team: Russia
- NHL draft: 50th overall, 2000; Colorado Avalanche
- Playing career: 1998–2018

Sergei Viktorovich Soin (Russian: Серге́й Викторович Соин; born March 31, 1982) is a Russian former professional ice hockey forward who played in the Kontinental Hockey League (KHL).

== Playing career ==
Soin began playing professionally as a 16-year old with Krylya Sovetov Moscow of the Russian Superleague in the 1998-99 season. Showing early promise as a prospect, Soin was selected in the second round, 50th overall, by the Colorado Avalanche in the 2000 NHL entry draft.

Soin formerly joined HC Dynamo Moscow on a two-year contract from the Severstal Cherepovets on May 16, 2011. After four seasons with Dynamo Moscow, Soin left the club to sign a two-year contract with Salavat Yulaev Ufa on May 28, 2015.

== Career statistics ==
=== Regular season and playoffs ===
			Regular season					Playoffs
Season	Team	League	GP	G	A	Pts	PIM	GP	G	A	Pts	PIM
1997–98	Krylya Sovetov–2 Moscow	RUS.3	2	0	0	0	0	—	—	—	—	—
1998–99	Krylya Sovetov Moscow	RSL	20	1	2	3	6	—	—	—	—	—
1999–2000	Krylya Sovetov Moscow	RUS.2	32	8	8	16	28	—	—	—	—	—
1999–2000	Krylya Sovetov–2 Moscow	RUS.3	8	2	3	5	12	—	—	—	—	—
2000–01	Krylya Sovetov Moscow	RUS.2	19	6	3	9	8	11	2	2	4	2
2000–01	Krylya Sovetov–2 Moscow	RUS.3	5	3	0	3	6	—	—	—	—	—
2001–02	Krylya Sovetov Moscow	RSL	40	5	7	12	8	—	—	—	—	—
2001–02	Krylya Sovetov–2 Moscow	RUS.3	5	2	6	8	4	—	—	—	—	—
2002–03	Krylya Sovetov Moscow	RSL	49	8	6	14	40	—	—	—	—	—
2002–03	Krylya Sovetov–2 Moscow	RUS.3	4	2	0	2	2	—	—	—	—	—
2003–04	CSKA Moscow	RSL	49	1	6	7	32	—	—	—	—	—
2003–04	CSKA–2 Moscow	RUS.3	12	8	6	14	6	—	—	—	—	—
2004–05	CSKA Moscow	RSL	19	3	3	6	10	—	—	—	—	—
2004–05	CSKA–2 Moscow	RUS.3	11	7	4	11	10	—	—	—	—	—
2005–06	Severstal Cherepovets	RSL	48	5	12	17	36	4	1	1	2	0
2006–07	Severstal Cherepovets	RSL	52	12	12	24	78	5	2	1	3	0
2007–08	Severstal Cherepovets	RSL	52	9	11	20	22	7	1	1	2	4
2008–09	Severstal Cherepovets	KHL	51	7	19	26	38	—	—	—	—	—
2009–10	Severstal Cherepovets	KHL	52	7	13	20	30	—	—	—	—	—
2010–11	Severstal Cherepovets	KHL	54	4	10	14	26	6	1	0	1	0
2011–12	Dynamo Moscow	KHL	52	10	12	22	61	21	0	1	1	22
2012–13	Dynamo Moscow	KHL	35	5	4	9	10	21	4	7	11	26
2013–14	Dynamo Moscow	KHL	19	7	6	13	24	2	0	0	0	6
2014–15	Dynamo Moscow	KHL	40	3	6	9	30	11	3	2	5	8
2015–16	Salavat Yulaev Ufa	KHL	47	5	7	12	51	18	3	2	5	33
2016–17	Salavat Yulaev Ufa	KHL	7	0	0	0	0	—	—	—	—	—
2017–18	Lada Togliatti	KHL	26	1	4	5	8	—	—	—	—	—
RSL totals			329	44	59	103	232	16	4	3	7	4
KHL totals			383	49	81	130	278	79	11	12	23	95

=== International ===
Medal record

Representing Russia

Ice hockey

World Junior Championships
Gold medal – first place	2002 Pardubice	

IIHF U18 Championships
Silver medal – second place	2000 Kloten	

Year	Team	Event	Result	GP	G	A	Pts	PIM
1999	Russia	WJC18	6th	7	1	2	3	4
2000	Russia	WJC18	2nd place, silver medalist(s)	6	0	1	1	6
2002	Russia	WJC	1st place, gold medalist(s)	7	2	0	2	0
2003	Russia	WC	5th	7	0	2	2	10
2013	Russia	WC	6th	8	1	3	4	2
Junior totals				20	3	3	6	10
Senior totals				15	1	5	6	12
