= Reto Suri =

Swiss ice hockey player

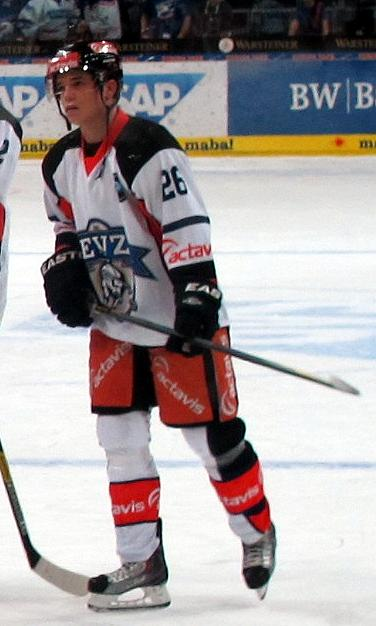
- Born: 25 March 1989 (age 37) Zürich, Switzerland
- Height: 6 ft 0 in (183 cm)
- Weight: 185 lb (84 kg; 13 st 3 lb)
- Position: Left wing
- Shot: Left
- Played for: Kloten Flyers; Genève-Servette HC; Lausanne HC; Rapperswil-Jona Lakers; EV Zug; HC Lugano
- National team: Switzerland
- NHL draft: Undrafted
- Playing career: 2007–2024

Reto Suri (born 25 March 1989) is a Swiss former professional ice hockey forward.

== Playing career ==
After his first season with Zug in 2012–13, Suri gained NHL attention and signed a two-year entry-level contract with the Tampa Bay Lightning on 13 June 2013. However, with an existing contract signed with Zug and at the time no transfer agreement with between the Swiss and International Hockey Federations, Suri's contract was voided a month later on 12 July 2013. Suri subsequently returned to Zug and produced a then career high 36 points in the 2013–14 season for Zug and was later signed to a four-year contract extension with an NHL-out clause on 30 September 2014.

At the conclusion of the 2018–19 season, Suri left Zug as a free agent and joined HC Lugano on a two-year deal through the 2020–21 season.

Suri retired from hockey at the end of the 2023–24 season, joining Zug's junior team as assistant coach, scout, and player developer. His number was retired by Zug on 28 September 2024.

== International play ==
Suri competed in the 2013 IIHF World Championship as a member of the Switzerland men's national ice hockey team, finishing in Switzerland's highest ever position with a silver medal.

== Career statistics ==
=== Regular season and playoffs ===
			Regular season					Playoffs
Season	Team	League	GP	G	A	Pts	PIM	GP	G	A	Pts	PIM
2005–06	Kloten Flyers	SUI U20	48	13	5	18	38	—	—	—	—	—
2006–07	Kloten Flyers	SUI U20	40	22	25	47	155	3	1	1	2	31
2006–07	EHC Bülach	SUI.3	4	3	0	3	4	3	0	0	0	16
2006–07	Switzerland U20	SUI.2	1	1	1	2	0	—	—	—	—	—
2007–08	Kloten Flyers	SUI U20	23	22	32	54	66	4	2	3	5	10
2007–08	Kloten Flyers	NLA	16	1	1	2	2	5	0	0	0	2
2007–08	Switzerland U20	SUI.2	8	3	7	10	6	—	—	—	—	—
2008–09	Genève–Servette HC	SUI U20	4	2	5	7	6	3	5	3	8	32
2008–09	Genève–Servette HC	NLA	22	2	3	5	4	4	1	0	1	0
2008–09	Lausanne HC	SUI.2	23	2	2	4	12	8	0	0	0	0
2008–09	Switzerland U20	SUI.2	6	0	2	2	14	—	—	—	—	—
2009–10	Genève–Servette HC	NLA	47	4	4	8	24	20	5	4	9	35
2010–11	Rapperswil–Jona Lakers	NLA	49	17	13	30	57	—	—	—	—	—
2011–12	Rapperswil–Jona Lakers	NLA	50	11	12	23	59	—	—	—	—	—
2012–13	EV Zug	NLA	46	14	11	25	34	14	9	5	14	20
2013–14	EV Zug	NLA	48	12	24	36	28	—	—	—	—	—
2014–15	EV Zug	NLA	50	15	24	39	48	6	0	2	2	4
2015–16	EV Zug	NLA	48	18	16	34	73	4	1	2	3	0
2016–17	EV Zug	NLA	45	4	12	16	32	16	2	2	4	12
2017–18	EV Zug	NL	44	11	16	27	30	5	0	2	2	2
2018–19	EV Zug	NL	50	18	17	35	22	13	4	5	9	4
2019–20	HC Lugano	NL	49	9	23	32	22	—	—	—	—	—
2020–21	HC Lugano	NL	49	8	13	21	53	5	1	0	1	2
2021–22	EV Zug	NL	49	12	15	27	36	10	0	1	1	0
2022–23	EV Zug	NL	30	2	1	3	6	10	3	0	3	16
2023–24	EV Zug	NL	15	2	1	3	6	10	0	1	1	2
NL totals			707	160	206	366	536	143	37	34	71	109

Medal record

Representing Switzerland

Ice hockey

World Championships
Silver medal – second place	2013 Sweden/Finland	

=== International ===
Year	Team	Event	Result	GP	G	A	Pts	PIM
2007	Switzerland	WJC18	6th	6	1	0	1	4
2008	Switzerland	WJC	9th	6	2	2	4	0
2013	Switzerland	WC	2nd place, silver medalist(s)	10	5	3	8	8
2014	Switzerland	OG	9th	3	0	1	1	2
2014	Switzerland	WC	10th	7	1	1	2	6
2015	Switzerland	WC	8th	8	1	0	1	0
2017	Switzerland	WC	6th	4	1	0	1	0
Junior totals				12	3	2	5	4
Senior totals				32	8	5	13	16
