= Roman Kukumberg =

Slovak ice hockey player

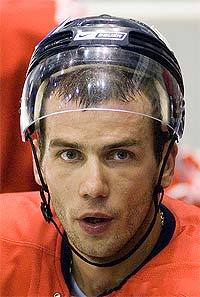
- Born: April 8, 1980 (age 46) Bratislava, Czechoslovakia
- Height: 6 ft 0 in (183 cm)
- Weight: 198 lb (90 kg; 14 st 2 lb)
- Position: Centre
- Shoots: Right
- CZE team Former teams: Mountfield HK; HK Dukla Trenčín (SVK); HC Neftekhimik Nizhnekamsk (RSL); HC Slovan Bratislava (SVK); HC Lada Togliatti (KHL); Ak Bars Kazan (KHL); Traktor Chelyabinsk (KHL); Amur Khabarovsk (KHL)
- National team: Slovakia
- NHL draft: 113th overall, 2004; Toronto Maple Leafs
- Playing career: 1997–present

Roman Kukumberg (born April 8, 1980) is a Slovak professional ice hockey player who is currently playing for the Mountfield HK of the Czech Extraliga.

Kukemberg was selected by the Toronto Maple Leafs in the 4th round (113th overall) of the 2004 NHL entry draft and spent one season playing in the American Hockey League for the Toronto Marlies in the 2005-06 AHL season. He also played for HC Dukla Trenčín, HC Neftekhimik Nizhnekamsk, HC Slovan Bratislava, HC Lada Togliatti, Ak Bars Kazan, Traktor Chelyabinsk and Amur Khabarovsk.

Kukumberg also represented Slovakia in four IIHF World Championships.

== Career statistics ==
=== Regular season and playoffs ===
			Regular season					Playoffs
Season	Team	League	GP	G	A	Pts	PIM	GP	G	A	Pts	PIM
1997–98	ŠHK Danubia 96 Bratislava	SVK.2	1	0	0	0	0	—	—	—	—	—
1998–99	ŠHK Danubia 96 Bratislava	SVK.2	24	5	5	10	8	—	—	—	—	—
1999–2000	MHC Nitra	SVK.2	42	16	14	30	10	—	—	—	—	—
2000–01	Dukla Trenčín	SVK	48	8	9	17	24	3	1	1	2	12
2001–02	Dukla Trenčín	SVK	46	12	9	21	20	—	—	—	—	—
2002–03	Dukla Trenčín	SVK	53	18	18	36	60	12	6	5	11	12
2003–04	Dukla Trenčín	SVK	51	16	20	36	93	11	4	8	12	14
2004–05	Neftekhimik Nizhnekamsk	RSL	55	10	11	21	40	3	0	0	0	4
2005–06	Toronto Marlies	AHL	54	2	6	8	30	—	—	—	—	—
2006–07	HC Slovan Bratislava	SVK	45	12	17	29	62	14	6	9	15	10
2007–08	Neftekhimik Nizhnekamsk	RSL	11	0	0	0	2	3	0	1	1	2
2008–09	HC Slovan Bratislava	SVK	56	18	39	57	78	12	5	8	13	6
2009–10	Lada Togliatti	KHL	49	14	9	23	26	—	—	—	—	—
2009–10	Ak Bars Kazan	KHL	6	0	1	1	4	20	5	1	6	8
2010–11	Traktor Chelyabinsk	KHL	13	2	3	5	8	—	—	—	—	—
2010–11	Amur Khabarovsk	KHL	34	6	6	12	4	—	—	—	—	—
2011–12	HC Slovan Bratislava	SVK	50	23	20	43	56	16	3	9	12	12
2012–13	HC Slovan Bratislava	KHL	52	10	11	21	39	4	1	0	1	2
2013–14	HC Slovan Bratislava	KHL	34	3	2	5	14	—	—	—	—	—
2014–15	Mountfield HK	ELH	51	7	14	21	47	4	1	0	1	32
2015–16	Mountfield HK	ELH	40	7	5	12	18	6	1	3	4	4
2016–17	Mountfield HK	ELH	45	12	12	24	8	11	3	1	4	6
2017–18	Mountfield HK	ELH	51	7	7	14	18	12	0	2	2	4
2018–19	Mountfield HK	ELH	30	4	4	8	18	4	1	0	1	0
2019–20	HC Slovan Bratislava	SVK	43	1	1	2	16	—	—	—	—	—
2020–21	HK Gladiators Trnava	SVK.2	28	12	21	33	8	—	—	—	—	—
2020–21	MHC Martin	SVK.2	7	1	2	3	0	10	1	3	4	0
2021–22	HK Gladiators Trnava	SVK.2	47	12	21	33	20	11	3	9	12	6
SVK totals			392	108	133	241	409	68	25	40	65	76
KHL totals			188	35	32	67	95	24	6	1	7	10
ELH totals			217	37	42	79	109	37	6	6	12	46

=== International ===
Year	Team	Event	GP	G	A	Pts	PIM
2000	Slovakia	WJC	7	1	2	3	4
2004	Slovakia	WC	9	0	0	0	2
2007	Slovakia	WC	7	1	1	2	8
2010	Slovakia	WC	6	0	1	1	0
2013	Slovakia	WC	8	0	7	7	0
Senior totals			30	1	9	10	10
