= Julian Walker =

Swiss ice hockey player

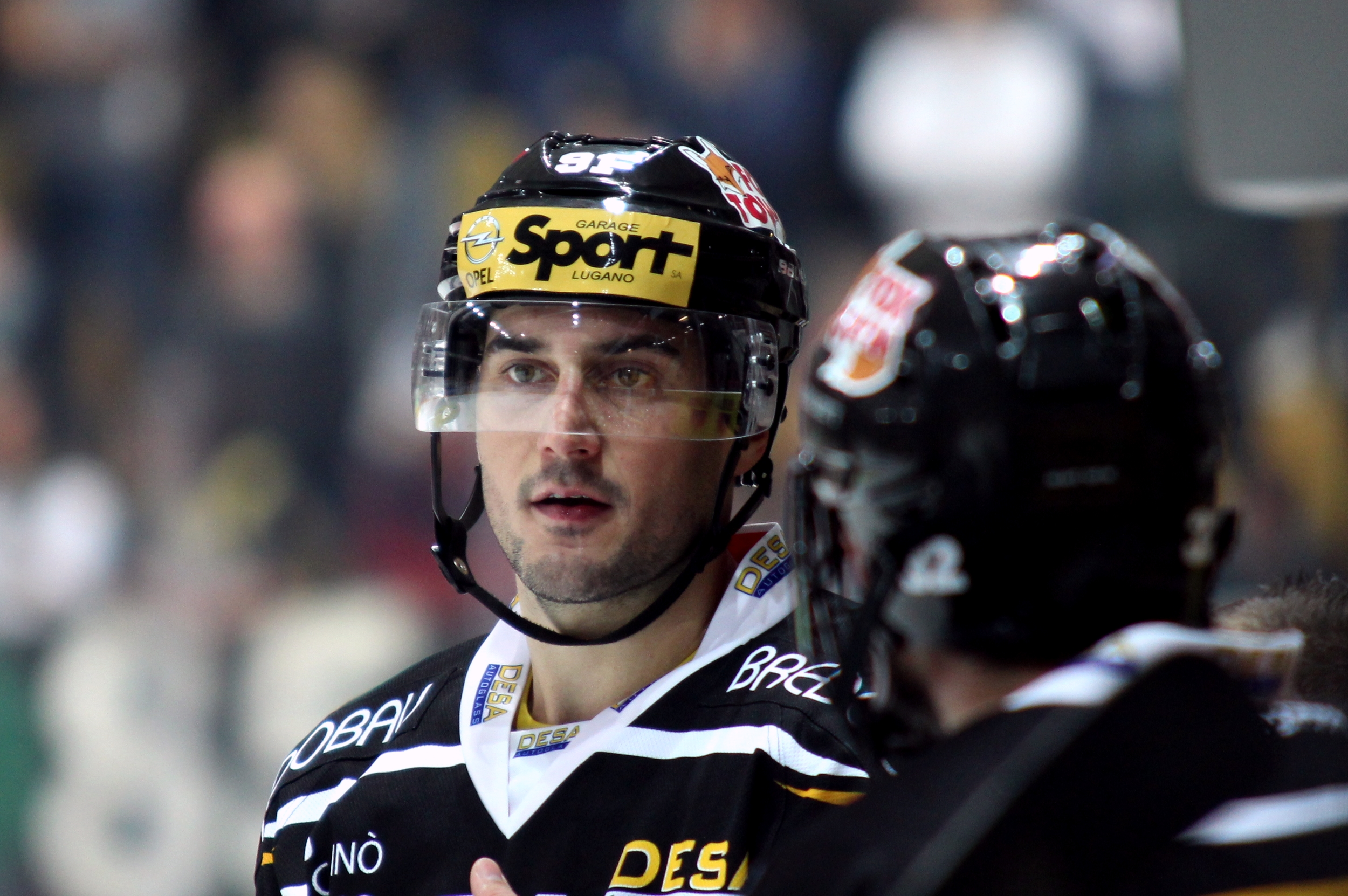
- Born: September 10, 1986 (age 39) Bern, Switzerland
- Height: 6 ft 2 in (188 cm)
- Weight: 207 lb (94 kg; 14 st 11 lb)
- Position: Forward
- Shoots: Right
- NL team Former teams: HC Lugano; SC Bern; EHC Basel; HC Ambrì-Piotta; Genève-Servette HC
- National team: Switzerland
- NHL draft: 162nd overall, 2006; Minnesota Wild
- Playing career: 2004–present

Julian Walker (born September 10, 1986) is a Swiss professional ice hockey forward who is currently playing for HC Lugano of the Swiss National League (NL).

== Playing career ==
He was selected 162nd overall by the Minnesota Wild in the 2006 NHL entry draft.

== International play ==
Walker competed in the 2013 IIHF World Championship as a member of the silver medal-winning Switzerland men's national ice hockey team.

== Career statistics ==
=== Regular season and playoffs ===
			Regular season					Playoffs
Season	Team	League	GP	G	A	Pts	PIM	GP	G	A	Pts	PIM
2002–03	SC Bern	SUI U20	34	2	5	7	14	3	0	0	0	4
2003–04	SC Bern	SUI U20	35	15	15	30	91	—	—	—	—	—
2004–05	SC Bern	SUI U20	42	25	32	57	84	9	1	11	12	10
2004–05	SC Bern	NLA	1	0	0	0	0	—	—	—	—	—
2004–05	SC Langenthal	SUI.2	3	0	0	0	0	—	—	—	—	—
2005–06	EHC Basel	NLA	36	2	0	2	41	5	1	0	1	6
2005–06	EHC Olten	SUI.2	2	0	0	0	2	—	—	—	—	—
2006–07	EHC Basel	NLA	40	4	4	8	16	—	—	—	—	—
2006–07	EHC Olten	SUI.2	8	8	4	12	4	—	—	—	—	—
2007–08	EHC Basel	NLA	49	0	6	6	22	—	—	—	—	—
2008–09	HC Ambrì–Piotta	NLA	50	11	14	25	36	—	—	—	—	—
2009–10	HC Ambrì–Piotta	NLA	48	6	16	22	40	—	—	—	—	—
2010–11	HC Ambrì–Piotta	NLA	41	3	7	10	61	—	—	—	—	—
2011–12	HC Ambrì–Piotta	NLA	37	7	12	19	38	—	—	—	—	—
2012–13	Genève–Servette HC	NLA	45	4	11	15	46	7	1	0	1	4
2013–14	HC Lugano	NLA	49	7	12	19	71	4	0	0	0	20
2014–15	HC Lugano	NLA	47	4	11	15	55	6	1	2	3	4
2015–16	HC Lugano	NLA	44	4	6	10	36	15	1	1	2	6
2016–17	HC Lugano	NLA	49	6	0	6	28	11	0	0	0	4
2017–18	HC Lugano	NL	48	10	9	19	63	18	2	4	6	50
2018–19	HC Lugano	NL	41	9	6	15	42	4	0	0	0	22
2019–20	HC Lugano	NL	33	6	9	15	32	—	—	—	—	—
2020–21	HC Lugano	NL	43	4	4	8	28	5	0	1	1	6
2021–22	HC Lugano	NL	50	4	3	7	44	—	—	—	—	—
2022–23	HC Lugano	NL	6	0	1	1	2	8	0	0	0	28
2022–23	HCB Ticino Rockets	SUI.2	2	1	0	1	2	—	—	—	—	—
NL totals			757	91	131	222	701	83	6	8	14	150

Medal record

Ice hockey

Representing Switzerland

World Championships
Silver medal – second place	2013 Sweden/Finland	

=== International ===
Year	Team	Event	Result	GP	G	A	Pts	PIM
2004	Switzerland	WJC18 D1	11th	5	1	1	2	10
2005	Switzerland	WJC	8th	6	0	1	1	0
2006	Switzerland	WJC	7th	6	2	2	4	6
2013	Switzerland	WC	2nd place, silver medalist(s)	10	3	5	8	8
2015	Switzerland	WC	8th	8	0	0	0	0
2016	Switzerland	WC	11th	7	0	0	0	2
Junior totals				17	3	4	7	16
Senior totals				25	3	5	8	10
