= Shinnik Bobruisk =

- City: Bobruisk
- League: Belarusian Extraliga
- Founded: 2008
- Home arena: Bobruisk Arena (capacity: 7,191)

Shinnik Bobruisk was an ice hockey team in Bobruisk, Belarus. The team competed in the Belarusian Extraliga (BXL) from 2008 to 2011.
