= List of Olympic men's ice hockey players for Belarus =

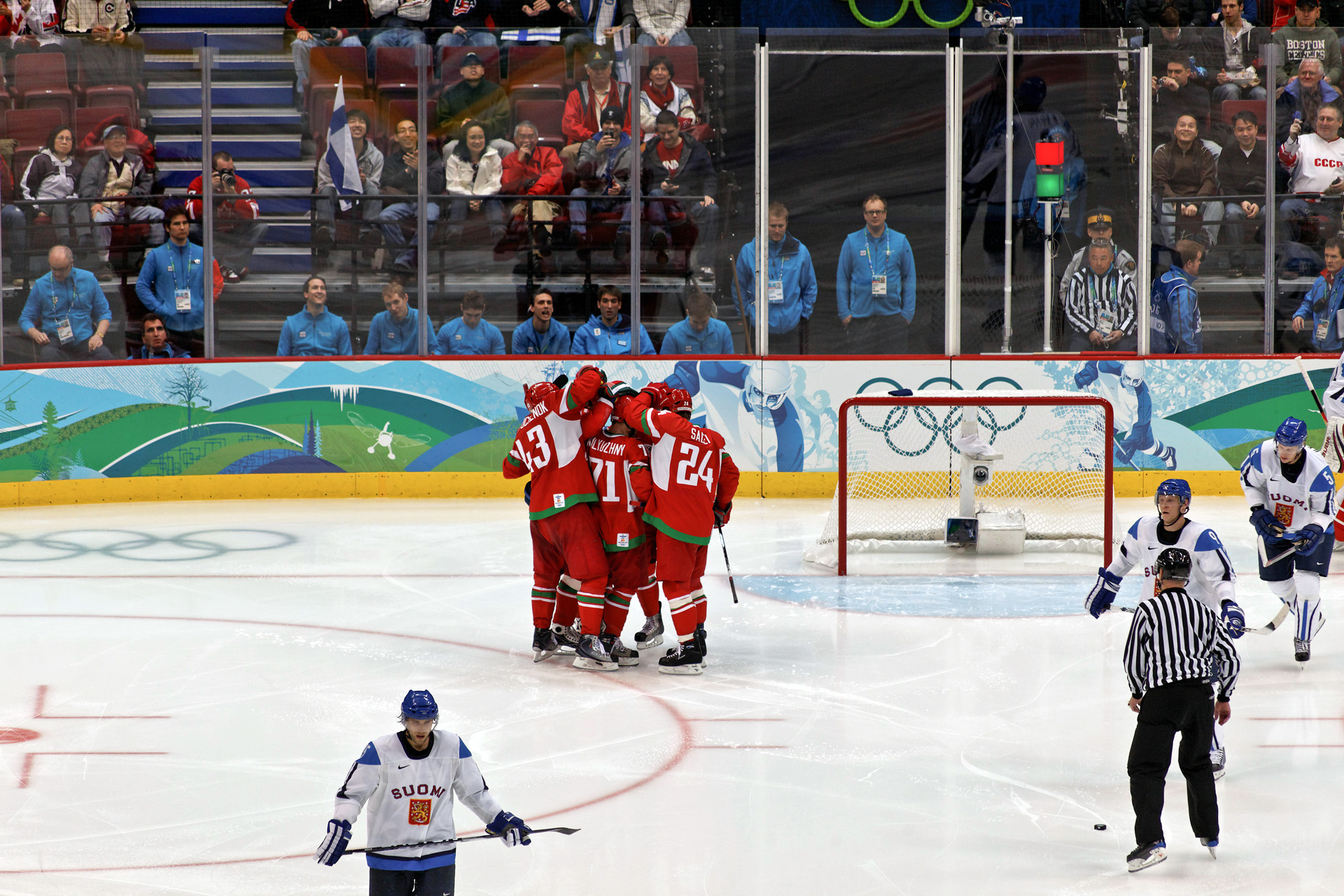
Belarusian players celebrate a goal at the 2010 Winter Olympics. The team finished ninth overall.

The list of Olympic men's ice hockey players for Belarus consists of 43 skaters and 4 goaltenders. Men's ice hockey tournaments have been staged at the Olympic Games since 1920 (it was introduced at the 1920 Summer Olympics, and was permanently added to the Winter Olympic Games in 1924). Belarus has participated in three tournaments since becoming independent in 1991: 1998, 2002 and 2010. As part of the Soviet Union, Belarus previously participated in the Winter Olympics from 1956 until 1988, as well as with the Unified Team at the 1992 Winter Olympics. Belarus has never won a medal in ice hockey, with their highest finish being fourth in 2002.

Four players — goaltender Andrei Mezin and skaters Oleg Antonenko, Alexei Kalyuzhny, and Ruslan Salei — have played in all three Olympics Belarus has participated in, with Kalyuzhny playing in the most games, 20. Kalyuzhny has scored the most goals for Belarus (5), while Alexander Andrievsky and Dmitri Dudik have the most assists (6). Five players — Andrievsky, Dudik, Kalyuzhny, Andrei Kovalev, and Vadim Bekbulatov — have 7 points, the most scored at the Olympics. Salei is the only Belarusian player to be inducted into the International Ice Hockey Federation Hall of Fame.

== Key ==
General terms
Term	Definition
GP	Games played
IIHFHOF	International Ice Hockey Federation Hall of Fame
Olympics	Number of Olympic Games tournaments
Ref(s)	Reference(s)

Goaltender statistical abbreviations
Abbreviation	Definition
W	Wins
L	Losses
T	Ties
Min	Minutes played
SO	Shutouts
GA	Goals against
GAA	Goals against average

Skater statistical abbreviations
Abbreviation	Definition
G	Goals
A	Assists
P	Points
PIM	Penalty minutes

== Goaltenders ==
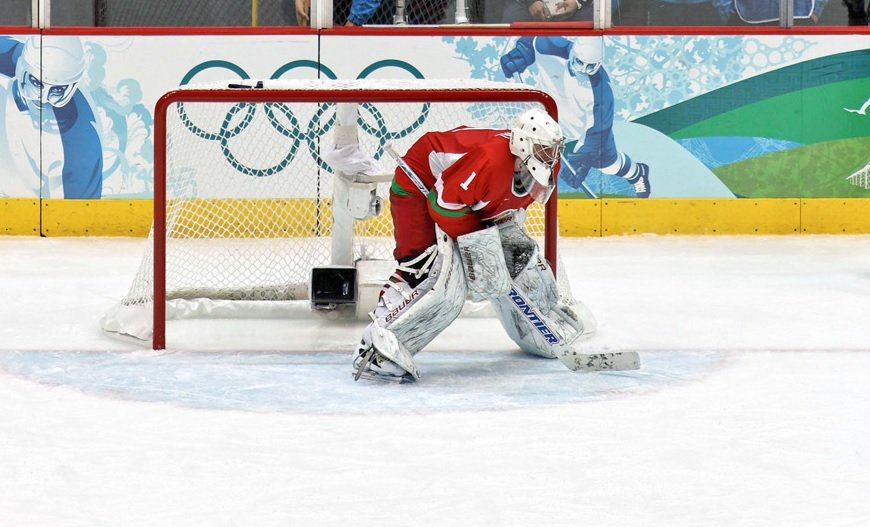
Vitali Koval played two games at the 2010 Winter Olympics.

Goaltenders
Player	Olympics	Tournament(s)	GP	W	L	T	Min	SO	GA	GAA	Notes	Ref(s)
Vitali Koval	1	2010	2	1	1	0	–	–	–	–		
Andrei Mezin	3	1998, 2002, 2010	15	–	–	–	–	–	–	–		
Sergei Shabanov	1	2002	3	–	–	–	–	–	–	–		
Alexander Shumidub	1	1998	8	–	–	–	–	–	–	–		

== Skaters ==
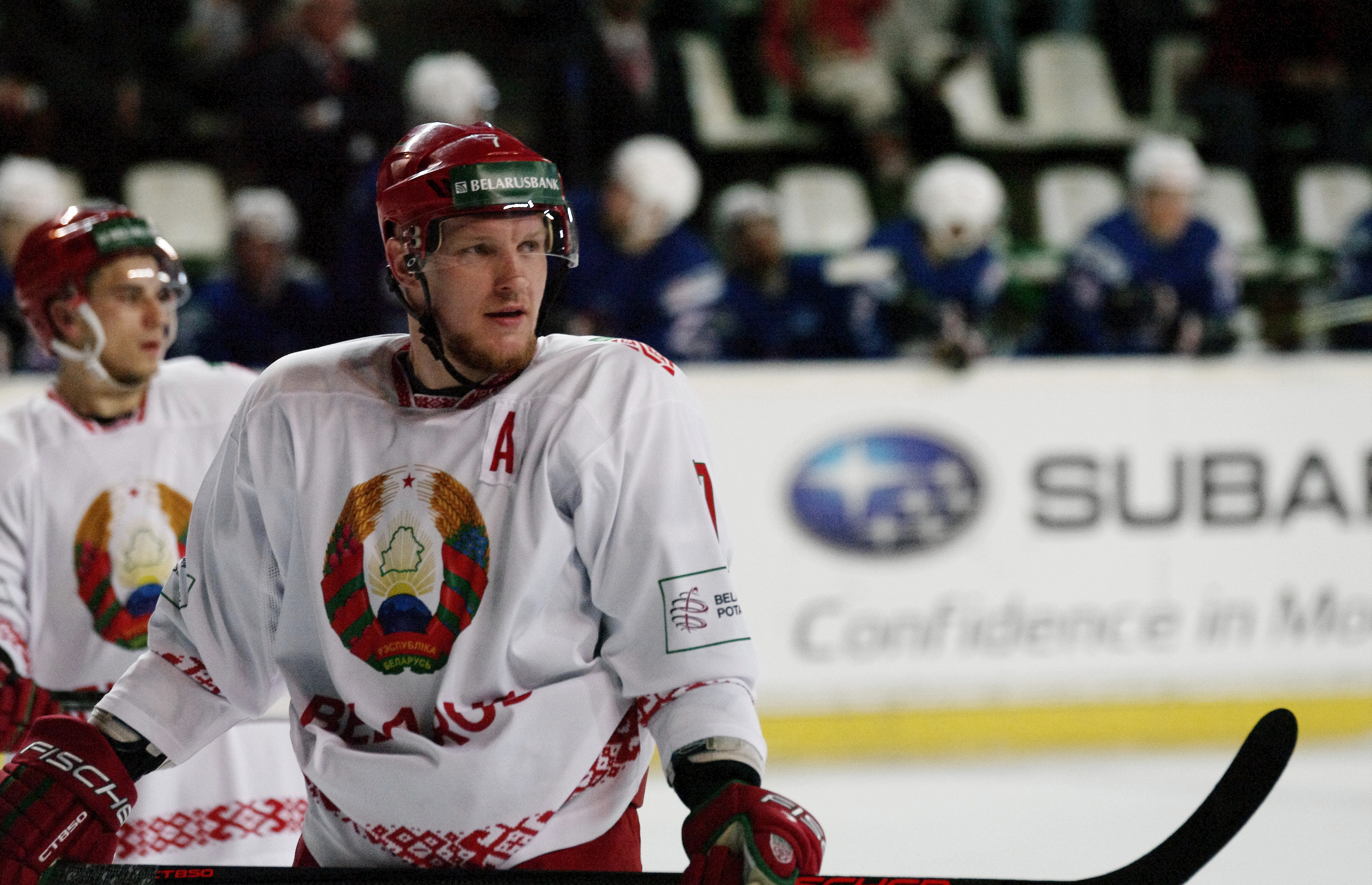
Vladimir Denisov played four games at the 2010 Winter Olympics.

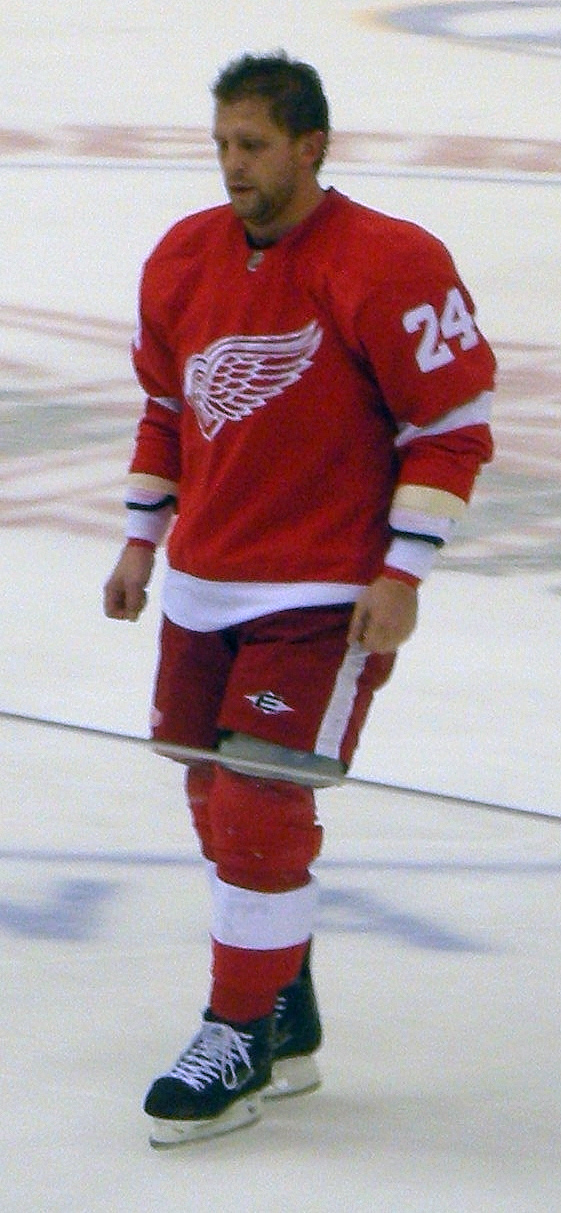
Ruslan Salei played for Belarus in all three Olympic tournaments they have participated in, and is the only Belarusian in the IIHF Hall of Fame.

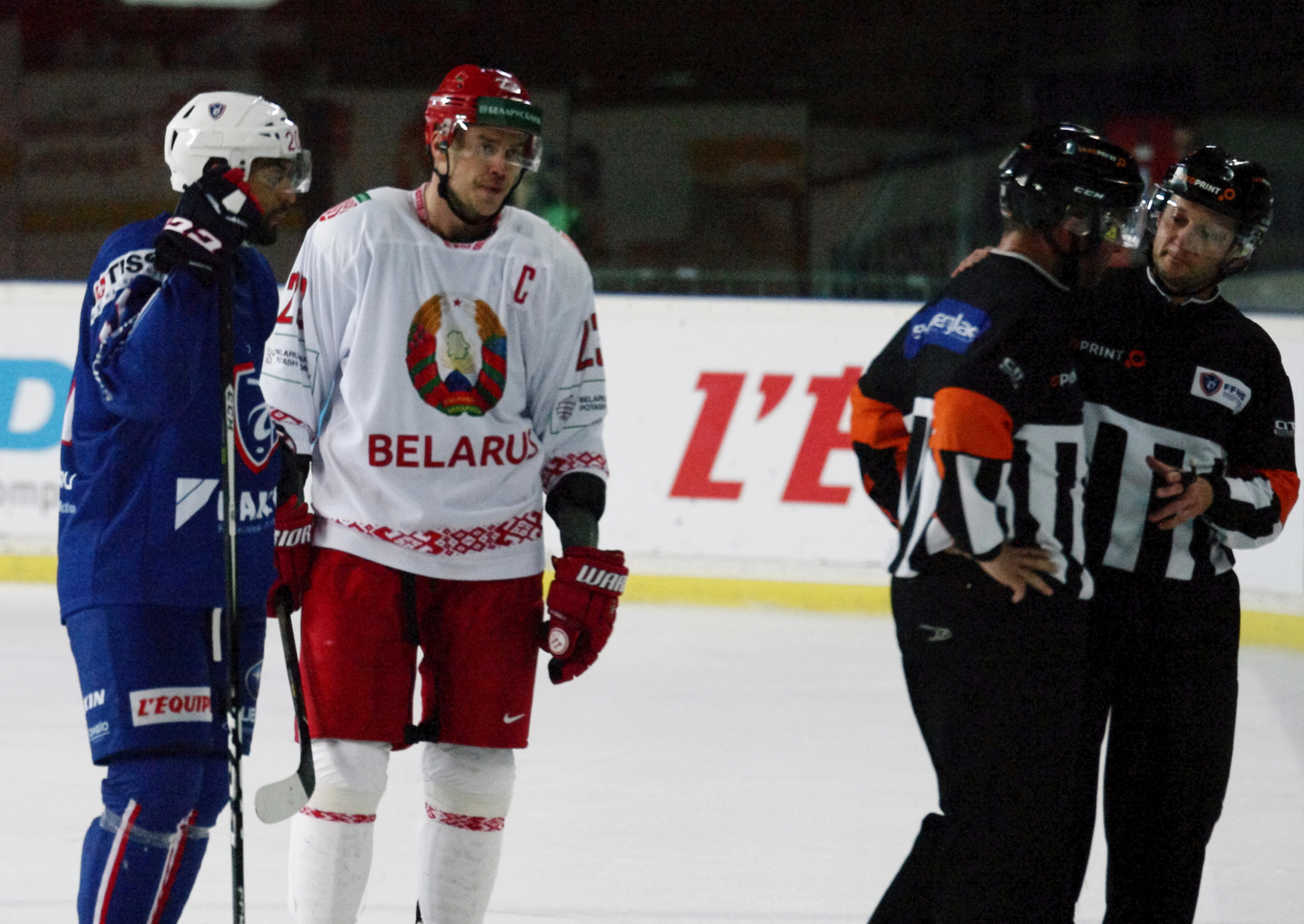
Andrei Stas appeared at the 2010 Winter Olympics.

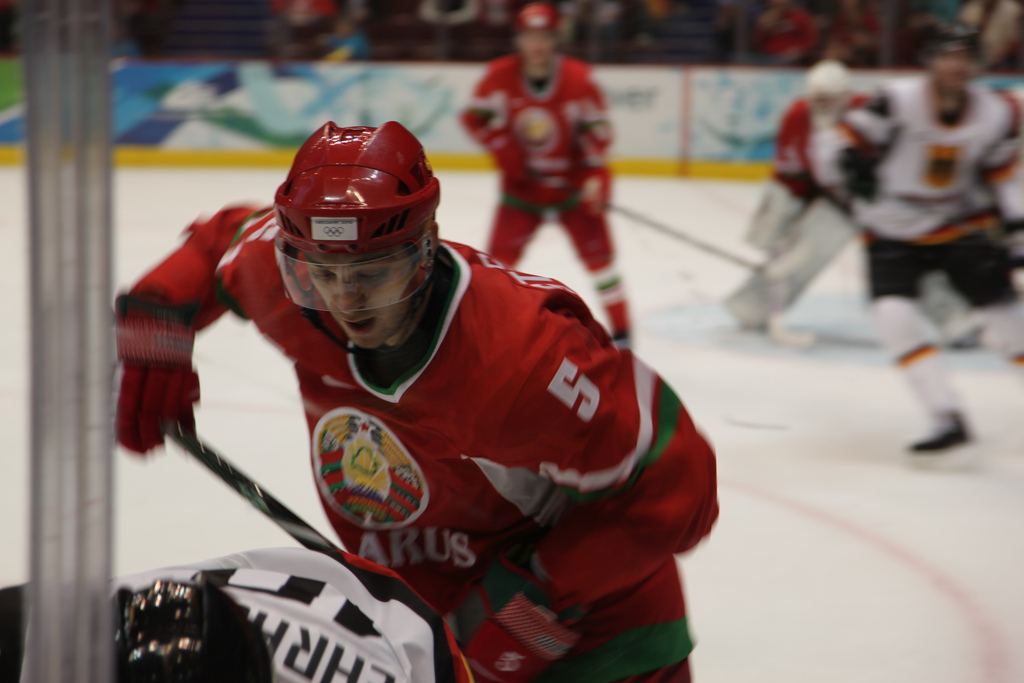
Nikolai Stasenko had three assists at the 2010 Winter Olympics.

Skaters
Player	Olympics	Tournaments	GP	G	A	P	PIM	Notes	Ref(s)
Alexander Alexiev	1	1998	7	1	1	2	0		
Alexander Andrievsky	2	1998, 2002	15	1	6	7	12		
Oleg Antonenko	3	1998, 2002, 2010	13	1	1	2	8		
Vadim Bekbulatov	2	1998, 2002	14	3	4	7	12		
Sergei Demagin	1	2010	4	0	1	1	2		
Vladimir Denisov	1	2010	4	0	0	0	0		
Dmitri Dudik	1	2002	9	1	6	7	6		
Alexander Galchenyuk	1	1998	7	1	2	3	0		
Alexei Kalyuzhny	3	1998, 2002, 2010	20	5	2	7	8		
Viktor Karachun	1	1998	7	2	1	3	8		
Andrei Karev	1	2010	3	0	0	0	2		
Oleg Khyml	2	1998, 2002	16	1	5	6	4		
Sergei Kolosov	1	2010	4	0	0	0	0		
Konstantin Koltsov	2	2002, 2010	6	0	2	2	0		
Vladimir Kopat	1	2002	8	1	1	2	4		
Sergei Kostitsyn	1	2010	4	2	3	5	0		
Viktor Kostyuchenok	1	2010	4	0	1	1	2		
Andrei Kovalev	2	1998, 2002	16	2	5	7	14		
Alexander Kulakov	1	2010	4	0	1	1	0		
Alexei Lozhkin	1	1998	7	0	2	2	0		
Alexander Makritski	2	2002, 2010	13	0	0	0	14		
Igor Matushkin	2	1998, 2002	16	1	3	4	4		
Dmitri Meleshko	1	2010	4	2	0	2	2		
Andrei Mikhalev	1	2010	4	0	0	0	2		
Oleg Mikulchik	1	2002	9	1	0	1	14		
Dmitri Pankov	1	2002	9	3	1	4	2		
Vasili Pankov	2	1998, 2002	16	2	1	3	10		
Andrei Rasolko	1	2002	9	1	1	2	0		
Oleg Romanov	2	1998, 2002	16	2	4	6	6		
Evgeni Roshchin	1	1998	6	0	2	2	0		
Alexander Ryadinsky	1	2010	4	0	1	1	2		
Ruslan Salei	3	1998, 2002, 2010	17	4	1	5	8	IIHFHOF (2014)	
Andrei Skabelka	2	1998, 2002	9	2	3	5	0		
Andrei Stas	1	2010	4	0	0	0	2		
Sergei Stas	2	1998, 2002	16	0	2	2	24		
Nikolai Stasenko	1	2010	4	0	3	3	2		
Vladimir Tsyplakov	2	1998, 2002	13	2	4	6	6		
Alexei Ugarov	1	2010	4	1	1	2	4		
Sergei Yerkovich	1	1998	7	2	0	2	16		
Sergei Zadelenov	1	2010	4	0	0	0	0		
Konstantin Zakharov	1	2010	4	1	0	1	4		
Eduard Zankovets	2	1998, 2002	8	0	0	0	2		
Alexander Zhurik	2	1998, 2002	13	0	1	1	16		

== See also ==
- Belarus men's national ice hockey team
