= Andrei Mikhalev =

Belarusian ice hockey player

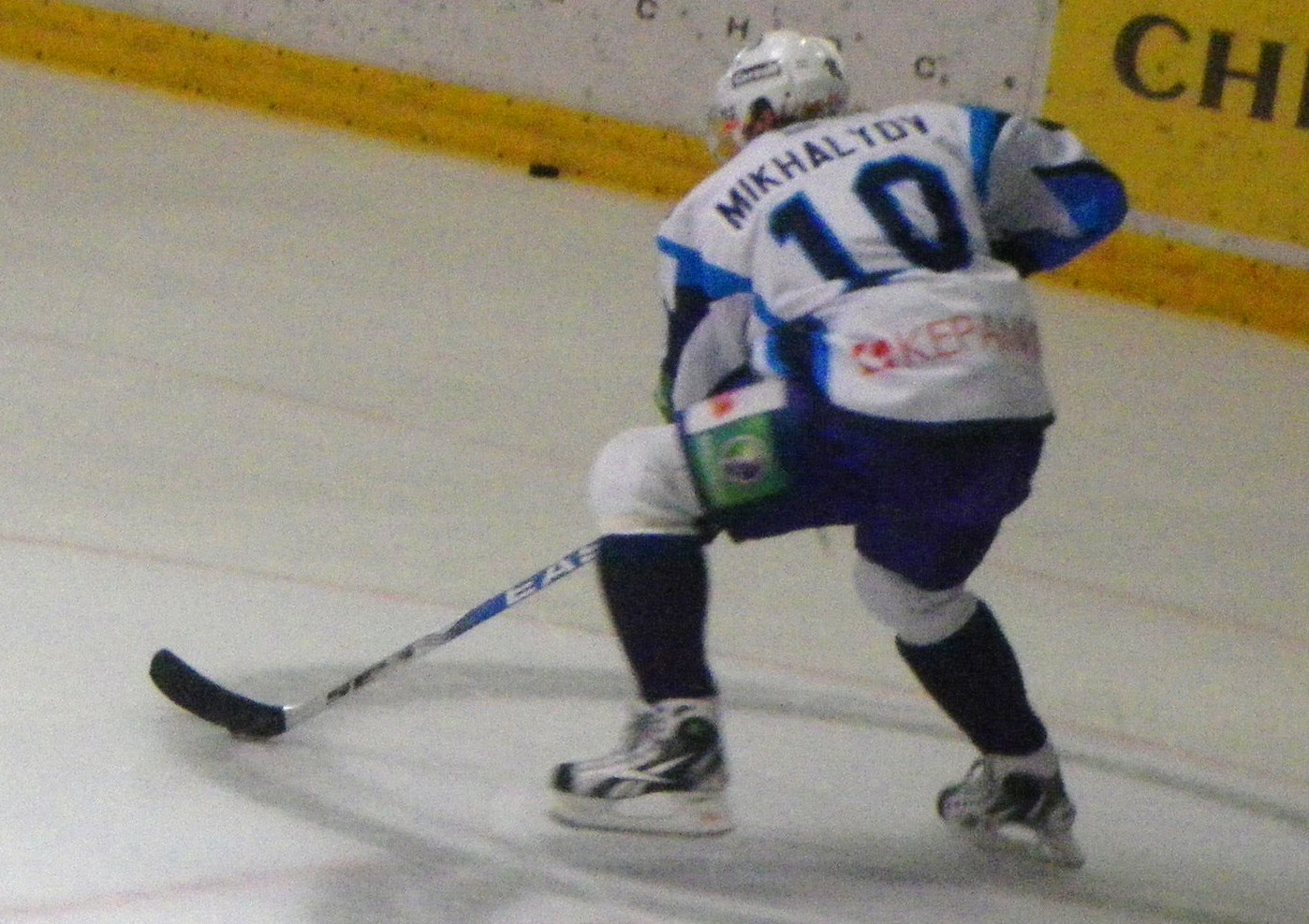
- Born: February 23, 1978 (age 47) Minsk, Byelorussian SSR, URS
- Height: 6 ft 0 in (183 cm)
- Weight: 201 lb (91 kg; 14 st 5 lb)
- Position: Right wing
- Shot: Left
- Played for: Dinamo Minsk
- National team: Belarus
- NHL draft: Undrafted
- Playing career: 1995–2017

Andrei Aleksandrovich Mikhalev (Russian: Андрей Александрович Михалёв) (born February 23, 1978) is a Belarusian former professional ice hockey forward. He most notably played for Dynamo Minsk of the Kontinental Hockey League.

== Playing career ==
Mikhalev began his professional career in 1995 and played five season with Yunost Minsk. Between 2002 and 2008 he played nine season with Keramin Minsk before earning a spot with the top level Dyanmo Minsk for the 2008–09 season.

He played in North America during the 1996–97 season, with the Nashville Nighthawks of the Central Hockey League and the Chicoutimi Saguenéens of the Quebec Major Junior Hockey League.

== International play ==
Mikhalev was selected for the Belarus national men's ice hockey team in the 2010 Winter Olympics. He also participated at the 2010 IIHF World Championship as a member of the Belarus National men's ice hockey team. He previously represented Belarus at the 1997 World Junior Championships, and the 2005, 2006, 2007, 2008, and 2009 Ice Hockey World Championships.

== Career statistics ==
=== Regular season and playoffs ===
			Regular season					Playoffs
Season	Team	League	GP	G	A	Pts	PIM	GP	G	A	Pts	PIM
1993–94	Yunost Minsk	RUS.3	1	0	0	0	0	—	—	—	—	—
1994–95	Yunost Minsk	RUS.2	2	1	0	1	0	—	—	—	—	—
1994–95	Yunost Minsk	BLR	4	0	0	0	2	—	—	—	—	—
1995–96	Yunost Minsk	EEHL	30	7	6	13	20	—	—	—	—	—
1996–97	Yunost Minsk	BLR	2	1	2	3	0	—	—	—	—	—
1996–97	Chicoutimi Saguenéens	QMJHL	6	0	1	1	4	—	—	—	—	—
1996–97	Nashville Nighthawks	CHL	3	2	0	2	0	—	—	—	—	—
1997–98	Yunost Minsk	BLR	18	6	4	10	4	—	—	—	—	—
1997–98	Yunost Minsk	EEHL	44	27	17	44	6	—	—	—	—	—
1998–99	Yunost Minsk	BLR	16	10	9	19	4	—	—	—	—	—
1998–99	Yunost Minsk	EEHL	32	19	19	38	28	—	—	—	—	—
1999–2000	Herner Miners	GER.3	50	34	31	65	134	—	—	—	—	—
1999–2000	HK Minsk	BLR	3	2	4	6	2	—	—	—	—	—
2000–01	ESV Bayreuth	GER.3	25	10	17	27	30	—	—	—	—	—
2000–01	EV Regensburg	GER.3	37	11	8	19	22	—	—	—	—	—
2001–02	Eisbären Regensburg	GER.2	27	6	6	12	12	—	—	—	—	—
2002–03	Keramin Minsk	BLR	38	12	13	25	40	7	1	4	5	16
2002–03	Keramin Minsk	BLR	33	9	11	20	28	—	—	—	—	—
2003–04	Keramin Minsk	BLR	44	11	9	20	28	8	2	3	5	0
2003–04	Keramin Minsk	BLR	28	12	6	18	26	—	—	—	—	—
2004–05	Keramin Minsk	BLR	37	8	9	17	20	13	4	2	6	12
2004–05	Keramin–2 Minsk	BLR.2	2	2	2	4	0	—	—	—	—	—
2005–06	Keramin Minsk	BLR	53	14	12	26	30	4	3	0	3	2
2006–07	Keramin Minsk	BLR	46	17	21	38	75	12	2	6	8	12
2007–08	Keramin Minsk	BLR	44	9	15	24	76	10	1	2	3	6
2008–09	Dinamo Minsk	KHL	55	14	9	23	56	—	—	—	—	—
2009–10	Dinamo Minsk	KHL	56	8	6	14	32	—	—	—	—	—
2010–11	Dinamo Minsk	KHL	51	8	7	15	22	7	3	1	4	0
2011–12	Dinamo Minsk	KHL	51	6	7	13	24	4	0	1	1	0
2012–13	Dinamo Minsk	KHL	33	3	6	9	9	—	—	—	—	—
2014–15	Shakhtyor Soligorsk	BLR	—	—	—	—	—	9	3	3	6	6
2015–16	Dinamo Minsk	KHL	53	2	2	4	14	—	—	—	—	—
2015–16	Dinamo–Molodechno	BLR	2	0	2	2	2	7	1	1	2	2
2016–17	Shakhtyor Soligorsk	BLR	40	14	11	25	32	10	0	3	3	4
BLR totals			347	104	111	215	315	80	17	24	41	60
EEHL totals			178	74	59	133	143	—	—	—	—	—
KHL totals			299	41	37	78	157	11	3	2	5	0

=== International ===
Year	Team	Event	GP	G	A	Pts	PIM
1995	Belarus	EJC	5	0	1	1	0
1996	Belarus	EJC	5	3	1	4	2
1997	Belarus	WJC C	4	0	0	0	6
1998	Belarus	WJC B	6	3	2	5	2
2001	Belarus	OGQ	3	0	1	1	6
2005	Belarus	WC	5	0	0	0	4
2006	Belarus	WC	7	0	2	2	4
2007	Belarus	WC	2	0	0	0	4
2008	Belarus	WC	6	1	1	2	6
2009	Belarus	WC	7	0	0	0	2
2010	Belarus	OG	4	0	0	0	2
2010	Belarus	WC	6	1	0	1	2
2011	Belarus	WC	6	3	1	4	6
2012	Belarus	WC	4	0	0	0	2
2013	Belarus	OGQ	3	0	0	0	0
Junior totals			20	6	4	10	10
Senior totals			53	5	5	10	38
