= Viktor Kostyuchenok =

Belarusian ice hockey player

- Born: June 7, 1979 (age 45); Minsk, Belorussian SSR, Soviet Union
- Height: 6 ft 2 in (188 cm)
- Weight: 220 lb (100 kg; 15 st 10 lb)
- Position: Defence
- Shot: Left
- Played for: Yunost Minsk; Lada Togliatti; Amur Khabarovsk; Spartak Moscow; Dinamo Minsk; Avtomobilist Yekaterinburg
- National team: Belarus
- Playing career: 1995–2014

Viktor Pavlovich Kostyuchenok (Belarusian: Віктар Паўлавіч Касцючонак; Russian: Виктор Павлович Костюченок) (born 7 June 1979) is a Belarusian former professional ice hockey defenceman and currently an assistant coach for HC Spartak Moscow of the Kontinental Hockey League (KHL). During a playing career that lasted from 1995 until 2014 he played for multiple teams across Europe.

== Playing career ==
He began playing professionally for Yunost Minsk in the Eastern European Hockey League in 1995. He spent 2000–01 and 2001–02 with HC Brest in the French league. He rejoined Minsky for another three seasons before playing for Lada Togliatti of the Russian Super League in 2006–07. He played for Minsk again the next season, and then joined Amur Khabarovsk in 2008 before HC Spartak Moscow.

=== International ===
Kostyuchenok was selected for the Belarus national men's ice hockey team in the 2010 Winter Olympics. He also participated at the 2010 IIHF World Championship as a member of the Belarus National men's ice hockey team. He previously represented Belarus in the 2005, 2006, 2007, 2008, and 2009 Ice Hockey World Championships.

== Career statistics ==
=== Regular season and playoffs ===
			Regular season					Playoffs
Season	Team	League	GP	G	A	Pts	PIM	GP	G	A	Pts	PIM
1995–96	Yunost Minsk	EEHL	8	2	0	2	2	—	—	—	—	—
1996–97	Yunost Minsk	BLR	8	0	1	1	8	—	—	—	—	—
1996–97	Yunost Minsk	EEHL	30	3	5	8	24	—	—	—	—	—
1997–98	Avangard–2 Omsk	RUS.3	4	0	2	2	2	—	—	—	—	—
1997–98	Yunost Minsk	BLR	15	0	3	3	6	—	—	—	—	—
1997–98	Yunost Minsk	EEHL	42	0	12	12	73	—	—	—	—	—
1998–99	Yunost Minsk	BLR	16	1	5	6	28	—	—	—	—	—
1998–99	Yunost Minsk	EEHL	46	11	27	38	80	—	—	—	—	—
1999–2000	HK Minsk	BLR	3	1	1	2	2	—	—	—	—	—
2000–01	HK Minsk	BLR	1	1	0	1	0	—	—	—	—	—
2000–01	HK Minsk	EEHL	14	3	4	7	10	—	—	—	—	—
2000–01	Deggendorf Fire	GER.3	5	0	0	0	2	—	—	—	—	—
2000–01	Brest Albatros Hockey	FRA.3	13	6	10	16		—	—	—	—	—
2001–02	Brest Albatros Hockey	FRA.3	16	4	10	14	30	—	—	—	—	—
2002–03	Brest Albatros Hockey	FRA	28	3	5	8	18	—	—	—	—	—
2003–04	Yunost Minsk	BLR	44	11	14	25	42	10	2	3	5	12
2004–05	Yunost Minsk	BLR	43	8	13	21	40	12	0	5	5	10
2004–05	Yunior Minsk	BLR.2	1	3	3	6	2	—	—	—	—	—
2005–06	Yunost Minsk	BLR	55	7	25	32	70	11	1	9	10	16
2006–07	Lada Togliatti	RSL	48	1	4	5	28	3	0	0	0	0
2007–08	Yunost Minsk	BLR	53	10	17	27	68	11	3	3	6	10
2008–09	Amur Khabarovsk	KHL	40	1	6	7	36	—	—	—	—	—
2009–10	Amur Khabarovsk	KHL	18	0	5	5	22	—	—	—	—	—
2009–10	Spartak Moscow	KHL	34	0	9	9	24	10	0	1	1	4
2010–11	Dinamo Minsk	KHL	30	0	9	9	34	7	0	0	0	4
2011–12	Avtomobilist Yekaterinburg	KHL	51	2	10	12	22	—	—	—	—	—
2012–13	Yunost Minsk	VHL	33	0	8	8	8	—	—	—	—	—
2012–13	Yunior Minsk	BLR	5	0	2	2	4	2	0	2	2	4
2013–14	Yunost Minsk	BLR	52	4	11	15	32	15	1	6	7	6
EEHL totals			140	19	48	67	189	—	—	—	—	—
BLR totals			295	43	92	135	300	61	7	28	35	58
KHL totals			173	3	39	42	138	17	0	1	1	8

=== International ===
Year	Team	Event	GP	G	A	Pts	PIM
1996	Belarus	EJC	5	1	1	2	0
1997	Belarus	WJC C	4	1	3	4	4
1997	Belarus	EJC B	6	0	0	0	20
1998	Belarus	WJC B	6	1	2	3	8
1999	Belarus	WJC	6	0	0	0	8
2002	Belarus	WC D1	5	0	0	0	0
2005	Belarus	OGQ	3	0	2	2	6
2006	Belarus	WC	7	1	1	2	0
2007	Belarus	WC	6	1	3	4	0
2008	Belarus	WC	6	1	2	3	10
2009	Belarus	WC	7	0	0	0	10
2010	Belarus	OG	4	0	1	1	2
2010	Belarus	WC	6	0	1	1	0
2011	Belarus	WC	6	1	1	2	8
2012	Belarus	WC	7	0	0	0	2
Junior totals			27	3	6	9	40
Senior totals			57	4	11	15	38
