= Andrei Bashko =

Belarusian ice hockey player

- Born: May 23, 1982 (age 43) Minsk, Belarusian SSR, USSR
- Height: 6 ft 2 in (188 cm)
- Weight: 187 lb (85 kg; 13 st 5 lb)
- Position: Defence
- Shot: Left
- Played for: HK Kremenchuk; HK Gomel; Yunost Minsk; Shakhtyor Soligorsk; Dinamo Minsk; Amur Khabarovsk; Metallurg Zhlobin; Metallurg Novokuznetsk; Keramin Minsk; HK Mogilev
- National team: Belarus
- Playing career: 1998–2017

Andrei Aleksandrovich Bashko (Russian: Андрей Александрович Башко) (born 23 May 1982 in Minsk, Belarusian SSR) is a Belarusian former professional ice hockey defenceman. Bashko began playing professionally in 1998 in the Eastern European Hockey League with Yunost Minsk. He also later played for Keramin Minsk. He had previously played for Metallurg Novokuznetsk and Amur Khabarovsk in the Kontinental Hockey League. At an international level, Bashko played for the Belarusian national team at three World Championships.

== Career statistics ==
=== Regular season and playoffs ===
			Regular season					Playoffs
Season	Team	League	GP	G	A	Pts	PIM	GP	G	A	Pts	PIM
1998–99	Yunost Minsk	BLR	1	0	0	0	2	—	—	—	—	—
1998–99	Yunost Minsk	EEHL	3	0	0	0	0	—	—	—	—	—
1999–2000	Yunost Minsk	EEHL	23	0	1	1	2	—	—	—	—	—
1999–2000	HK Minsk	BLR	12	0	0	0	2	—	—	—	—	—
2000–01	HK Minsk	BLR	15	1	3	4	4	—	—	—	—	—
2000–01	HK Minsk	EEHL	9	1	0	1	2	—	—	—	—	—
2000–01	Khimvolokno Mogilev	BLR	10	1	2	3	6	—	—	—	—	—
2001–02	Keramin Minsk	BLR	17	2	3	5	2	7	2	4	6	4
2001–02	Keramin Minsk	EEHL	33	2	4	6	18	—	—	—	—	—
2002–03	Keramin Minsk	BLR	42	9	21	30	61	7	0	2	2	4
2002–03	Keramin Minsk	EEHL	36	3	13	16	38	—	—	—	—	—
2003–04	Keramin Minsk	BLR	44	5	12	17	30	8	2	4	6	29
2003–04	Keramin Minsk	EEHL	28	5	5	10	32	—	—	—	—	—
2004–05	Keramin Minsk	BLR	44	4	18	22	16	15	0	5	5	4
2005–06	Metallurg Novokuznetsk	RSL	26	0	1	1	12	—	—	—	—	—
2005–06	Metallurg–2 Novokuznetsk	RUS.3	2	1	0	1	0	—	—	—	—	—
2006–07	Dinamo Minsk	BLR	34	9	9	18	26	12	3	2	5	2
2007–08	Metallurg Zhlobin	BLR	53	6	22	28	72	4	0	1	1	22
2008–09	Amur Khabarovsk	KHL	32	1	4	5	22	—	—	—	—	—
2009–10	Dinamo Minsk	KHL	6	0	1	1	0	—	—	—	—	—
2009–10	Shakhtyor Soligorsk	BLR	45	9	12	21	34	14	3	4	7	35
2010–11	Shakhtyor Soligorsk	BLR	47	8	15	23	44	8	3	4	7	8
2010–11	Yunost Minsk	BLR	3	0	2	2	0	—	—	—	—	—
2011–12	Shakhtyor Soligorsk	BLR	37	11	20	31	14	2	0	0	0	2
2011–12	Yunost Minsk	BLR	3	0	2	2	4	—	—	—	—	—
2012–13	Yunost Minsk	VHL	43	4	9	13	20	—	—	—	—	—
2012–13	Yunost Minsk	BLR	7	1	5	6	0	2	1	1	2	0
2013–14	Yunost Minsk	BLR	41	7	22	29	14	14	1	8	9	6
2014–15	HK Gomel	BLR	41	2	20	22	20	6	1	1	2	2
2015–16	HK Gomel	BLR	42	6	12	18	18	10	0	2	2	45
2016–17	HK Kremenchuk	UKR	35	3	13	16	10	10	1	2	3	4
2017–18	Abu Dhabi Storms	UAE	6	2	4	6	27	4	2	6	8	2
BLR totals			538	81	200	281	369	109	16	38	54	163
EEHL totals			132	11	23	34	54	—	—	—	—	—

=== International ===
Year	Team	Event	GP	G	A	Pts	PIM
2000	Belarus	WJC B	5	0	0	0	0
2000	Belarus	WJC18	6	0	2	2	2
2001	Belarus	WJC	6	0	0	0	2
2002	Belarus	WJC	5	0	0	0	0
2005	Belarus	OGQ	3	2	0	2	2
2005	Belarus	WC	6	0	1	1	2
2008	Belarus	WC	2	0	0	0	0
2009	Belarus	WC	7	0	1	1	2
Junior totals			21	0	2	2	4
Senior totals			18	2	2	4	6
