= Dmitri Dudik =

Belarusian ice hockey player

- Born: 2 November 1977 (age 48) Minsk, Belarusian SSR, USSR
- Height: 6 ft 0 in (183 cm)
- Weight: 201 lb (91 kg; 14 st 5 lb)
- Position: Right wing
- Shot: Right
- Played for: HK Neman Grodno; China Dragon; HC Shakhtyor Soligorsk; Yunost Minsk; Keramin Minsk; HC Dynamo Minsk; HK Gomel; Nürnberg Ice Tigers; Tivali Minsk
- National team: Belarus
- Playing career: 1992–2011

Dmitri Vladimirovich Dudik (Belarusian: Дзмітрый Уладзiмiравiч Дудзiк, Russian: Дмитрий Владимирович Дудик; born 2 November 1977) is a Belarusian former ice hockey player, who was later appointed as the head coach of HK Lida of the Belarusian Extraleague. Dudik played for several teams in Belarus, Germany, and China in his playing career, which lasted from 1992 until 2011. Internationally he played for the Belarusian national team in multiple World Championships, and played in the 2002 Winter Olympics.

== Career statistics ==
=== Regular season and playoffs ===
			Regular season					Playoffs
Season	Team	League	GP	G	A	Pts	PIM	GP	G	A	Pts	PIM
1992–93	Tivali Minsk	BLR	1	0	0	0	0	—	—	—	—	—
1993–94	Yunost Minsk	RUS.3	34	8	5	13	16	—	—	—	—	—
1993–94	Tivali Minsk	BLR	5	0	1	1	2	—	—	—	—	—
1994–95	Yunost Minsk	RUS.2	24	9	1	10	26	—	—	—	—	—
1994–95	Yunost Minsk	BLR	3	0	0	0	12	—	—	—	—	—
1996–97	Nürnberg Ice Tigers	DEL	21	3	5	8	37	—	—	—	—	—
1997–98	Nürnberg Ice Tigers	DEL	41	2	2	4	38	4	0	2	2	35
1998–99	Nürnberg Ice Tigers	DEL	52	4	7	11	36	13	0	0	0	10
1999–2000	Nürnberg Ice Tigers	DEL	51	0	5	5	53	—	—	—	—	—
2000–01	Nürnberg Ice Tigers	DEL	47	12	12	24	46	2	0	0	0	0
2001–02	HK Gomel	BLR	12	8	2	10	50	—	—	—	—	—
2001–02	HK Gomel	EEHL	28	11	13	24	22	—	—	—	—	—
2002–03	Keramin Minsk	BLR	26	7	21	28	76	6	2	2	4	4
2002–03	Keramin Minsk	EEHL	27	8	18	26	70	—	—	—	—	—
2003–04	Keramin Minsk	BLR	43	26	26	52	34	8	6	6	12	14
2003–04	Keramin Minsk	EEHL	29	16	12	28	34	—	—	—	—	—
2004–05	Yunost Minsk	BLR	43	15	15	30	30	12	5	6	11	12
2005–06	HK Gomel	BLR	31	5	14	19	40	—	—	—	—	—
2005–06	Dinamo Minsk	BLR	22	9	3	12	30	10	3	3	6	22
2006–07	Dinamo Minsk	BLR	48	18	15	33	60	12	5	4	9	16
2007–08	Dinamo Minsk	BLR	49	9	29	38	77	8	1	2	3	22
2008–09	Dinamo Minsk	KHL	34	5	9	14	16	—	—	—	—	—
2008–09	Keramin Minsk	BLR	11	3	5	8	24	3	0	1	1	6
2009–10	Yunost Minsk	BLR	30	5	14	19	8	11	5	1	6	18
2009–10	Shakhtyor Soligorsk	BLR	8	2	5	7	10	—	—	—	—	—
2010–11	China Dragon	ALH	31	9	7	16	34	—	—	—	—	—
2010–11	HK Neman Grodno	BLR	7	3	3	6	6	11	2	3	5	8
BLR totals			339	110	153	263	459	81	29	28	57	122
DEL totals			212	21	31	52	210	19	0	2	2	45

=== International ===
Year	Team	Event	GP	G	A	Pts	PIM
1994	Belarus	EJC B	5	0	0	0	2
1995	Belarus	WJC C1	4	0	0	0	2
1995	Belarus	EJC	5	4	2	6	6
1996	Belarus	WJC C	4	2	4	6	4
1997	Belarus	WJC C	4	6	6	12	0
2000	Belarus	WC	6	0	0	0	2
2002	Belarus	OG	9	2	1	3	6
2004	Belarus	WC D1	5	2	2	4	0
2005	Belarus	WC	6	0	0	0	2
2006	Belarus	WC	7	3	0	3	2
2007	Belarus	WC	6	2	1	3	8
2008	Belarus	WC	6	1	1	2	2
Junior totals			22	12	12	24	14
Senior totals			45	10	5	15	22
