= Vladimir Denisov (ice hockey) =

Belarusian ice hockey player (born 1984)

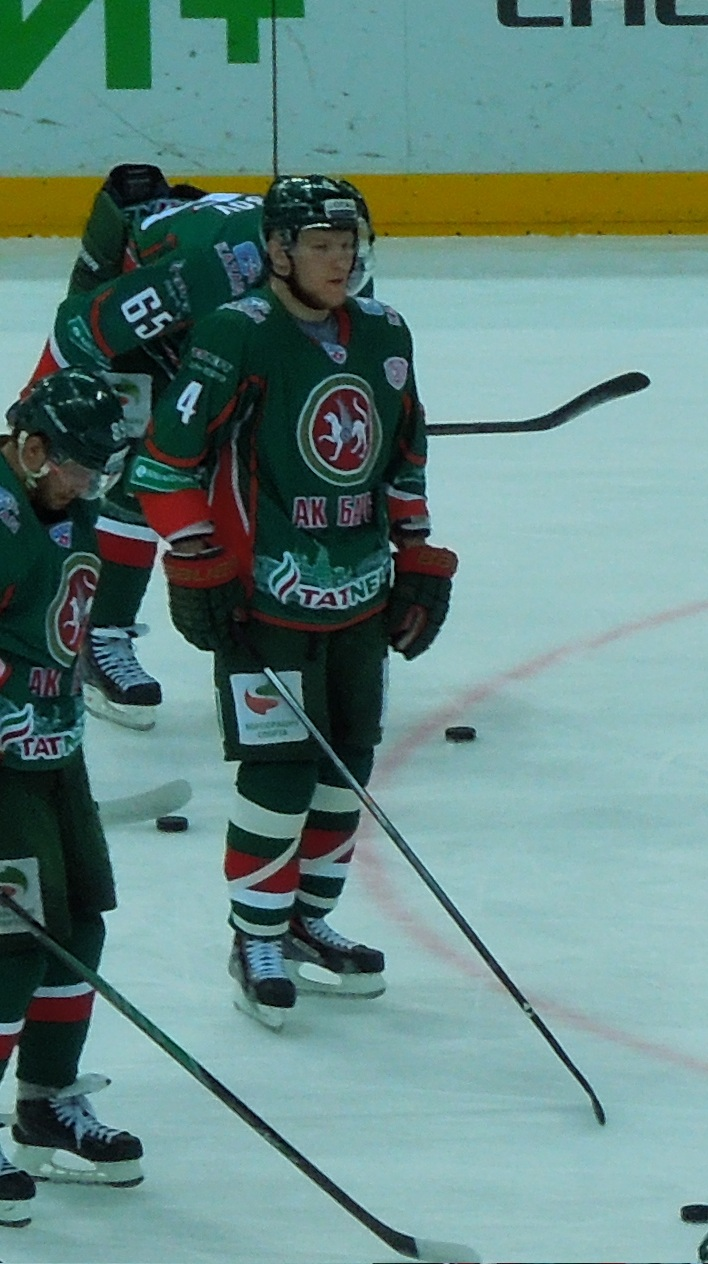
- Born: 29 June 1984 (age 42) Chashniki, Byelorussian SSR, USSR
- Height: 5 ft 11 in (180 cm)
- Weight: 207 lb (94 kg; 14 st 11 lb)
- Position: Defense
- Shot: Left
- Played for: HC Lada Togliatti; Lake Erie Monsters; Hartford Wolf Pack; Dinamo Minsk; HC Ambrì-Piotta; Torpedo Nizhny Novgorod; Ak Bars Kazan; Traktor Chelyabinsk; SaiPa
- National team: Belarus
- NHL draft: Undrafted
- Playing career: 2001–2019

Vladimir Mikhailovich Denisov, also spelled sometimes as Uladzimir Mikhailavich Dzianisau (Belarusian: Уладзі́мір Міха́йлавіч Дзяні́саў, romanized: Uladzimir Mikhaylavich Dzyanisaw) (born 29 June 1984) is a Belarusian former professional ice hockey defenseman. He last played for SaiPa of the Finnish Liiga. He participated at the 2010 IIHF World Championship as a member of the Belarusian national team.

== Playing career ==
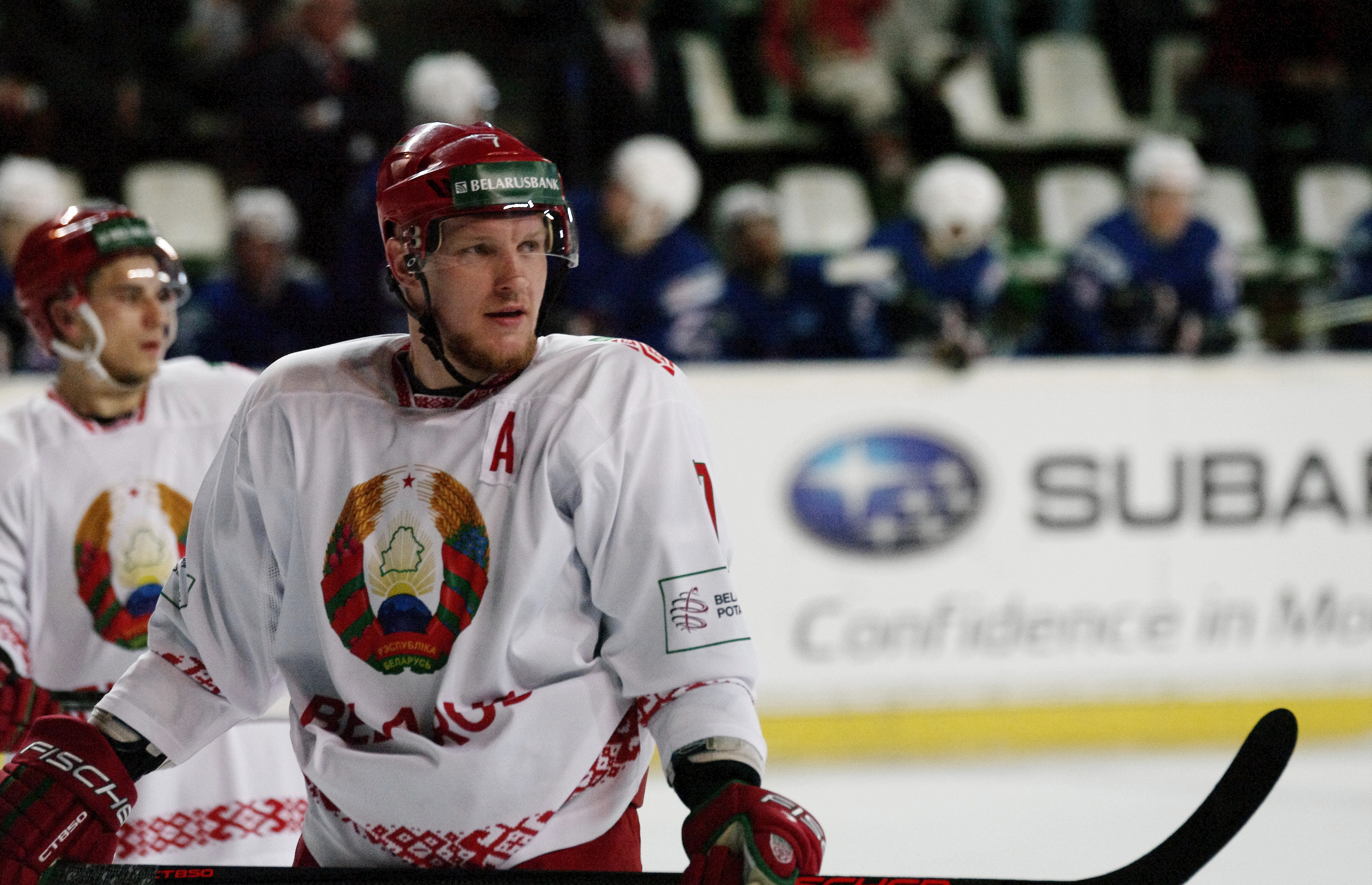
Denisov with the Belarusian national team in 2017

Denisov played in the Russian Hockey Super League for HC Lada Togliatti in the 2006–07 season. With ambitions to play in the NHL, Vladimir signed with affiliate of the Colorado Avalanche, the Lake Erie Monsters, in the AHL for the 2007–08 season.

While using the season with the Monsters to adjust to the North American game, Denisov impressed with his physicality and signed his first NHL contract with the New York Rangers for the 2008–09 season on 10 July 2008. Denisov was assigned to AHL affiliate, the Hartford Wolf Pack, to start the season. Vladimir eclipsed previous highs for goals and assists, however frustrated from lack of opportunity with the Rangers he requested a trade in January but played the season out.

On 5 September 2009, Vladimir was invited to the Washington Capitals training camp for the 2009–10 season. Failing to earn a contract with the Capitals, and rejecting the option to try out with the Capitals affiliate, the Hershey Bears, Denisov returned to Belarus where he signed for HC Dinamo Minsk of the KHL on 29 September 2009. Denisov appeared on the Blueline in 42 games with Minsk and posted 14 points but as the team was unable to advance to the playoffs, he was not tendered a new contract.

On 29 September 2010, Denisov moved to the Swiss National League A, signing to a one-year contract with HC Ambrì-Piotta.

Denisov returned to Dinamo Minsk as a main-stay on the blueline for the following two seasons before signing a contract with KHL rival Salavat Yulaev Ufa for two-years on 22 May 2013. Before the season commenced, Denisov was traded by Ufa without having played a game to Torpedo Nizhny Novgorod on 9 September 2013.

== Career statistics ==
=== Regular season and playoffs ===
			Regular season					Playoffs
Season	Team	League	GP	G	A	Pts	PIM	GP	G	A	Pts	PIM
2000–01	Khimik–ShVSM Vitebsk	BLR	20	1	3	4	26	—	—	—	—	—
2001–02	HK Vitebsk	BLR	17	2	1	3	66	2	0	0	0	2
2001–02	HK Vitebsk	EEHL B	20	1	0	1	14	—	—	—	—	—
2001–02	Yunost Minsk	BLR	5	1	1	2	4	—	—	—	—	—
2002–03	HK Vitebsk	BLR	37	2	1	3	112	—	—	—	—	—
2002–03	HK Vitebsk	EEHL	31	1	0	1	77	—	—	—	—	—
2002–03	HK–2 Vitebsk	BLR.2	8	4	7	11	12	—	—	—	—	—
2003–04	Khimik–SKA Novopolotsk	BLR	41	3	8	11	107	2	0	0	0	8
2003–04	Yunior Minsk	BLR	1	0	0	0	2	—	—	—	—	—
2004–05	Dinamo Minsk	BLR	1	0	0	0	0	—	—	—	—	—
2004–05	Keramin Minsk	BLR	12	0	1	1	12	4	0	0	0	8
2004–05	Keramin–2 Minsk	BLR.2	9	3	2	5	20	—	—	—	—	—
2005–06	Keramin Minsk	BLR	35	1	1	2	65	4	0	2	2	6
2005–06	Keramin–2 Minsk	BLR.2	1	0	1	1	0	—	—	—	—	—
2006–07	Lada Togliatti	RSL	39	0	3	3	76	3	0	0	0	6
2006–07	Lada–2 Togliatti	RUS.3	2	0	1	1	0	—	—	—	—	—
2007–08	Lake Erie Monsters	AHL	66	2	6	8	111	—	—	—	—	—
2007–08	Johnstown Chiefs	ECHL	5	0	2	2	26	—	—	—	—	—
2008–09	Hartford Wolf Pack	AHL	62	5	15	20	117	2	0	0	0	2
2009–10	Dinamo Minsk	KHL	42	5	9	14	68	—	—	—	—	—
2010–11	HC Ambrì–Piotta	NLA	37	1	4	5	54	17	1	7	8	14
2011–12	Dinamo Minsk	KHL	47	4	2	6	115	4	0	0	0	2
2012–13	Dinamo Minsk	KHL	50	1	2	3	50	—	—	—	—	—
2013–14	Torpedo Nizhny Novgorod	KHL	49	5	9	14	36	6	0	1	1	2
2014–15	Ak Bars Kazan	KHL	56	3	10	13	56	19	0	1	1	10
2015–16	Ak Bars Kazan	KHL	10	1	1	2	13	—	—	—	—	—
2015–16	Traktor Chelyabinsk	KHL	23	1	1	2	16	—	—	—	—	—
2016–17	Traktor Chelyabinsk	KHL	45	1	2	3	54	5	0	0	0	18
2017–18	Dinamo Minsk	KHL	40	1	2	3	42	—	—	—	—	—
2017–18	SaiPa	Liiga	7	0	3	3	16	9	0	1	1	16
2018–19	SaiPa	Liiga	40	1	4	5	86	—	—	—	—	—
BLR totals			169	10	16	26	394	12	0	2	2	24
KHL totals			362	22	38	60	450	34	0	2	2	32

=== International ===
Year	Team	Event	GP	G	A	Pts	PIM
2001	Belarus	WJC18 D1	5	0	0	0	2
2002	Belarus	WJC18	8	0	1	1	27
2003	Belarus	WJC	6	0	1	1	4
2004	Belarus	WJC D1	5	0	3	3	8
2006	Belarus	WC	6	0	1	1	35
2007	Belarus	WC	6	0	1	1	14
2008	Belarus	WC	6	0	3	3	6
2009	Belarus	WC	5	0	0	0	6
2010	Belarus	OG	4	0	0	0	0
2010	Belarus	WC	6	0	1	1	2
2011	Belarus	WC	4	0	1	1	4
2012	Belarus	WC	7	0	1	1	10
2013	Belarus	OGQ	3	0	3	3	6
2014	Belarus	WC	8	1	1	2	12
2017	Belarus	WC	2	0	1	1	2
2018	Belarus	WC	5	0	0	0	10
Junior totals			24	0	5	5	41
Junior totals			62	1	13	14	107
