= Alexander Kulakov =

Belarusian ice hockey player

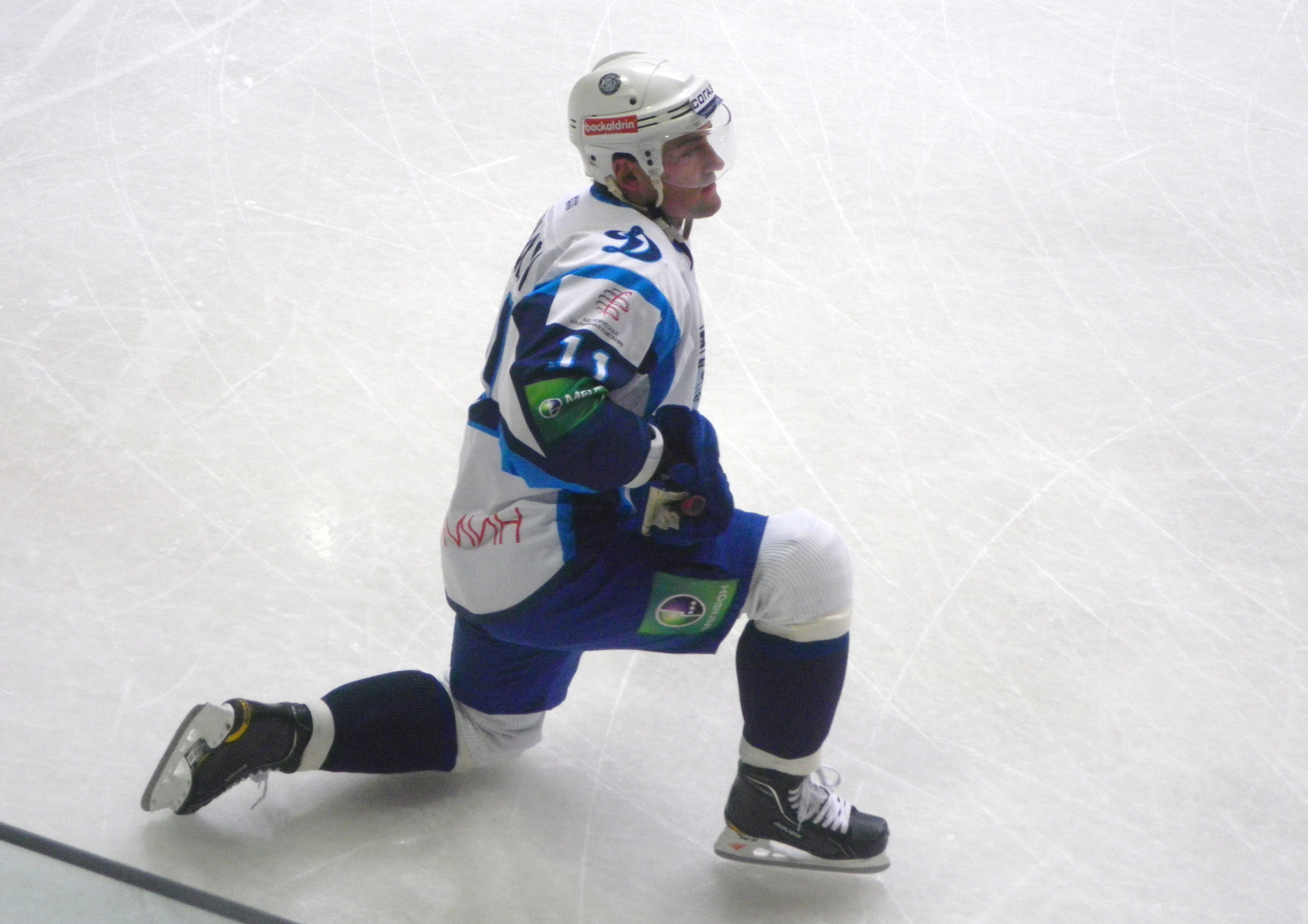
- Born: 15 May 1983 (age 43) Minsk, Byelorussian SSR, URS
- Height: 6 ft 0 in (183 cm)
- Weight: 196 lb (89 kg; 14 st 0 lb)
- Position: Left wing
- Shot: Left
- Played for: Yunost Minsk; Dinamo Minsk; HC Shakhter Soligorsk; Torpedo Nizhny Novgorod
- National team: Belarus
- Playing career: 2001–2021

Alexander Viktorovich Kulakov (Russian: Александр Викторович Кулаков, Belarusian: Аляксандр Віктаравіч Кулакоў) (born 15 May 1983) is a Belarusian former professional ice hockey forward. He most notably played in the Kontinental Hockey League, joining Torpedo Nizhny Novgorod after a lengthy first tenure with HC Dinamo Minsk. He has also competed in the Eastern European Hockey League and the Belarusian Extraliga.

Kulakov was selected for the Belarus national team in the 2010 Winter Olympics. He also participated at the 2010 IIHF World Championship. He previously represented Belarus at the 2000 and 2001 IIHF World U18 Championships, the 2001, 2002 and 2003 IIHF World U20 Championship, and the 2007, 2008 and 2009 Ice Hockey World Championships.

== Career statistics ==
=== Regular season and playoffs ===
			Regular season					Playoffs
Season	Team	League	GP	G	A	Pts	PIM	GP	G	A	Pts	PIM
2000–01	Yunost Minsk	BLR	7	5	4	9	18	—	—	—	—	—
2001–02	Keramin Minsk	BLR	12	2	0	2	0	5	0	1	1	2
2001–02	Keramin Minsk	EEHL	25	4	5	9	10	—	—	—	—	—
2002–03	HK Vitebsk	BLR	39	4	6	10	28	—	—	—	—	—
2002–03	HK Vitebsk	EEHL	28	3	4	7	18	—	—	—	—	—
2003–04	Yunost Minsk	BLR	8	0	0	0	2	—	—	—	—	—
2003–04	Yunior Minsk	BLR	6	0	1	1	6	—	—	—	—	—
2003–04	Dinamo Minsk	BLR	20	3	4	7	4	4	0	0	0	0
2003–04	Dinamo–2 Minsk	BLR.2	5	5	1	6	0	—	—	—	—	—
2004–05	Dinamo Minsk	BLR	41	12	8	20	28	—	—	—	—	—
2004–05	Dinamo–2 Minsk	BLR.2	1	0	0	0	4	—	—	—	—	—
2004–05	Khimik–SKA Novopolotsk	BLR	1	1	1	2	0	3	0	0	0	0
2005–06	Dinamo Minsk	BLR	54	13	13	26	36	10	0	0	0	2
2006–07	Dinamo Minsk	BLR	49	11	13	24	32	12	4	5	9	8
2006–07	Dinamo–2 Minsk	BLR.2	2	2	2	4	0	—	—	—	—	—
2007–08	Dinamo Minsk	BLR	53	15	25	40	66	8	3	4	7	4
2008–09	Dinamo Minsk	KHL	37	6	10	16	12	—	—	—	—	—
2008–09	Keramin Minsk	BLR	15	6	3	9	2	—	—	—	—	—
2009–10	Dinamo Minsk	KHL	40	5	5	10	8	—	—	—	—	—
2009–10	Shakhtyor Soligorsk	BLR	10	5	5	10	2	14	4	8	12	14
2010–11	Dinamo Minsk	KHL	53	9	12	21	22	7	1	4	5	4
2011–12	Dinamo Minsk	KHL	52	8	10	18	24	3	0	1	1	25
2012–13	Dinamo Minsk	KHL	50	8	3	11	28	—	—	—	—	—
2013–14	Torpedo Nizhny Novgorod	KHL	16	0	1	1	2	—	—	—	—	—
2014–15	Dinamo Minsk	KHL	56	7	9	16	16	5	0	0	0	0
2015–16	Dinamo Minsk	KHL	7	0	0	0	0	—	—	—	—	—
2016–17	Dinamo Minsk	KHL	46	5	9	14	20	5	0	1	1	4
2017–18	Dinamo Minsk	KHL	35	3	3	6	8	—	—	—	—	—
2017–18	Shakhtyor Soligorsk	BLR	14	2	7	9	12	7	3	5	8	16
2018–19	Yunost Minsk	BLR	49	5	33	38	8	11	2	7	9	25
2019–20	Yunost Minsk	BLR	54	2	18	20	12	11	1	2	3	10
2020–21	Podhale Nowy Targ	POL	2	0	0	0	2	4	0	3	3	4
BLR totals			432	86	141	227	256	85	17	32	49	81
KHL totals			392	51	62	113	140	20	1	6	7	33

=== International ===
Year	Team	Event	GP	G	A	Pts	PIM
2000	Belarus	WJC18	6	1	1	2	4
2001	Belarus	WJC	6	1	1	2	0
2001	Belarus	WJC18 D1	5	3	5	8	12
2002	Belarus	WJC	6	0	2	2	4
2003	Belarus	WJC	6	2	0	2	2
2007	Belarus	WC	6	2	2	4	6
2008	Belarus	WC	5	0	1	1	0
2009	Belarus	WC	7	0	0	0	2
2010	Belarus	OG	4	0	1	1	0
2010	Belarus	WC	6	0	0	0	0
2011	Belarus	WC	6	1	5	6	2
2012	Belarus	WC	5	0	0	0	2
2013	Belarus	OGQ	3	1	1	2	2
2013	Belarus	WC	7	1	1	2	4
2015	Belarus	WC	8	0	3	3	2
2016	Belarus	OGQ	3	0	1	1	0
2017	Belarus	WC	7	2	0	2	0
Junior totals			29	7	9	16	22
Senior totals			67	7	15	22	20
