= Vadim Bekbulatov =

Belarusian ice hockey player

Personal information
- Nationality: Belarusian
- Born: 8 March 1970 (age 55); Yekaterinburg, Russia

Sport
- Sport: Ice hockey

Vadim Bekbulatov (born 8 March 1970) is a Belarusian ice hockey player. He competed in the men's tournaments at the 1998 Winter Olympics and the 2002 Winter Olympics.

== Career statistics ==
=== Regular season and playoffs ===
			Regular season					Playoffs
Season	Team	League	GP	G	A	Pts	PIM	GP	G	A	Pts	PIM
1988–89	Dinamo Minsk	URS	19	2	2	4	8	—	—	—	—	—
1988–89	Progress Grodno	URS.3	8	2	1	3	14	—	—	—	—	—
1989–90	Dinamo Minsk	URS	43	9	3	12	10	—	—	—	—	—
1990–91	Dinamo Minsk	URS	27	2	4	6	8	—	—	—	—	—
1991–92	Dinamo Minsk	CIS	24	2	2	4	8	—	—	—	—	—
1992–93	Dinamo Minsk	IHL	37	9	2	11	22	—	—	—	—	—
1992–93	Tivali Minsk	BLR	11	3	13	16	4	—	—	—	—	—
1993–94	Tivali Minsk	IHL	35	2	5	7	22	—	—	—	—	—
1993–94	Tivali Minsk	BLR	16	6	6	12	6	—	—	—	—	—
1994–95	Brûleurs de Loups	FRA	9	7	8	15	2	5	0	5	5	18
1995–96	Severstal Cherepovets	IHL	52	13	11	24	28	4	2	2	4	4
1996–97	Severstal Cherepovets	RSL	38	6	16	22	38	3	1	1	2	0
1997–98	Severstal Cherepovets	RSL	46	7	16	23	20	4	1	2	3	0
1998–99	HC Chemopetrol, a.s.	ELH	45	4	6	10	47	—	—	—	—	—
1999–2000	SKA St. Petersburg	RSL	16	1	2	3	14	—	—	—	—	—
2000–01	SKA St. Petersburg	RSL	4	0	0	0	0	—	—	—	—	—
2000–01	Vityaz Podolsk	RSL	10	2	1	3	6	—	—	—	—	—
2000–01	Dinamo–Energija Yekaterinburg	RSL	9	1	4	5	6	—	—	—	—	—
2000–01	HK Minsk	BLR	1	0	0	0	0	—	—	—	—	—
2001–02	HK Minsk	BLR	4	0	0	0	0	—	—	—	—	—
2001–02	HK Minsk	EEHL	11	3	5	8	6	—	—	—	—	—
2001–02	Dinamo–Energija Yekaterinburg	RUS.2	10	1	6	7	4	11	2	4	6	4
2002–03	Yunost Minsk	BLR	14	5	9	14	4	—	—	—	—	—
2002–03	HK Gomel	BLR	22	9	15	24	20	4	1	2	3	2
2003–04	HK Gomel	BLR	30	6	17	23	16	—	—	—	—	—
2003–04	HK Gomel	BLR	38	11	17	28	55	9	1	2	3	2
2004–05	HK Gomel	BLR	18	2	3	5	10	—	—	—	—	—
2004–05	Dinamo Minsk	BLR	22	4	9	13	32	—	—	—	—	—
2005–06	Dinamo Minsk	BLR	34	1	2	3	16	—	—	—	—	—
URS/CIS totals			113	15	11	26	34	—	—	—	—	—
IHL totals			124	24	18	42	72	4	2	2	4	4
RSL totals			123	17	39	56	84	7	2	3	5	0

=== International ===
Year	Team	Event	GP	G	A	Pts	PIM
1992	Belarus	WC C Q	2	0	0	0	2
1994	Belarus	WC C	6	1	4	5	6
1996	Belarus	WC B	6	0	2	2	16
1997	Belarus	WC B	7	4	2	6	14
1998	Belarus	OG	5	2	2	4	4
1998	Belarus	WC	6	2	3	5	8
1999	Belarus	WC	6	0	2	2	12
2001	Belarus	OGQ	3	0	0	0	2
2002	Belarus	OG	9	1	2	3	8
2003	Belarus	WC	6	0	0	0	6
Senior totals			56	10	17	27	78

"Vadim Bekbulatov". Elite Prospects.
