= Vladimir Kopat =

Belarusian ice hockey player (born 1971)

Personal information
- Nationality: Belarusian
- Born: 23 April 1971 (age 53); Minsk, Byelorussian SSR, Soviet Union

Sport
- Sport: Ice hockey

Vladimir Kopat (born 23 April 1971) is a Belarusian ice hockey player. He competed in the men's tournament at the 2002 Winter Olympics.

== Career statistics ==
=== Regular season and playoffs ===
			Regular season					Playoffs
Season	Team	League	GP	G	A	Pts	PIM	GP	G	A	Pts	PIM
1988–89	Progress Grodno	URS.3	50	7	4	11	41	—	—	—	—	—
1989–90	Progress Grodno	URS.2	4	1	0	1	8	—	—	—	—	—
1990–91	Khimik Novopolotsk	URS.3	67	15	12	27	102	—	—	—	—	—
1991–92	Khimik Novopolotsk	CIS.3	2	0	1	1	2	—	—	—	—	—
1991–92	Dinamo Minsk	CIS	26	0	2	2	10	—	—	—	—	—
1992–93	Dinamo Minsk	IHL	30	2	4	6	28	—	—	—	—	—
1992–93	Tivali Minsk	BLR	9	3	1	4	6	—	—	—	—	—
1993–94	Tivali Minsk	BLR	15	2	7	9	23	—	—	—	—	—
1993–94	Tivali Minsk	IHL	43	3	16	19	30	—	—	—	—	—
1994–95	Tivali Minsk	BLR	9	2	9	11	6	—	—	—	—	—
1994–95	Tivali Minsk	IHL	43	3	9	12	50	—	—	—	—	—
1995–96	Avangard Omsk	IHL	39	3	4	7	26	3	0	0	0	2
1996–97	Torpedo Yaroslavl	RSL	31	4	2	6	34	9	0	2	2	10
1996–97	Torpedo–2 Yaroslavl	RUS.3	4	0	3	3	4	—	—	—	—	—
1997–98	Torpedo Yaroslavl	RSL	46	1	3	4	36	2	0	0	0	4
1998–99	Severstal Cherepovets	RSL	39	2	3	5	38	2	0	1	1	4
1999–2000	Severstal Cherepovets	RSL	36	2	11	13	38	6	0	2	2	22
2000–01	Severstal Cherepovets	RSL	32	1	7	8	34	9	0	3	3	6
2000–01	Severstal–2 Cherepovets	RUS.3	1	1	0	1	0	—	—	—	—	—
2001–02	SKA St. Petersburg	RSL	3	0	1	1	2	—	—	—	—	—
2001–02	Neftekhimik Nizhnekamsk	RSL	12	0	1	1	12	—	—	—	—	—
2002–03	Krylia Sovetov Moscow	RSL	8	0	0	0	8	—	—	—	—	—
2002–03	Krylia Sovetov–2 Moscow	RUS.3	1	1	0	1	2	—	—	—	—	—
2002–03	Keramin Minsk	BLR	8	1	0	1	2	7	3	4	7	4
2002–03	Keramin Minsk	EEHL	6	1	0	1	2	—	—	—	—	—
2003–04	Keramin Minsk	BLR	38	5	11	16	76	8	1	3	4	8
2003–04	Keramin Minsk	EEHL	29	0	12	12	28	—	—	—	—	—
2004–05	Yunost Minsk	BLR	36	3	9	12	18	12	0	7	7	2
2005–06	Yunost Minsk	BLR	47	3	12	15	82	11	0	4	4	16
2006–07	Yunost Minsk	BLR	47	8	21	29	82	9	0	0	0	10
2007–08	Yunost Minsk	BLR	5	0	1	1	10	—	—	—	—	—
2007–08	HK Gomel	BLR	21	0	10	10	55	—	—	—	—	—
2008–09	HK Gomel	BLR	39	4	17	21	52	8	1	3	4	8
2009–10	HK Gomel	BLR	34	4	15	19	50	—	—	—	—	—
2009–10	HK–2 Gomel	BLR.2	1	1	0	1	0	—	—	—	—	—
IHL totals			155	11	33	44	134	3	0	0	0	2
BLR totals			305	35	113	148	462	55	5	21	26	48
RSL totals			207	10	28	38	222	28	0	8	8	46

=== International ===
Year	Team	Event	GP	G	A	Pts	PIM
1994	Belarus	WC C	6	0	1	1	16
1995	Belarus	WC C	4	0	1	1	6
1996	Belarus	WC B	7	1	1	2	16
1999	Belarus	WC	6	0	0	0	6
2000	Belarus	WC	6	0	0	0	4
2001	Belarus	OGQ	3	0	0	0	0
2001	Belarus	WC	6	0	1	1	2
2002	Belarus	OG	8	1	1	2	4
2002	Belarus	WC D1	5	1	2	3	4
2003	Belarus	WC	5	0	0	0	2
2005	Belarus	WC	6	0	0	0	0
2006	Belarus	WC	6	1	1	2	12
Senior totals			68	4	8	12	72

"Vladimir Kopat". Elite Prospects.
