= Oleg Romanov (ice hockey) =

Belarusian ice hockey player

Personal information
- Nationality: Belarusian
- Born: 31 March 1970 (age 56) Minsk, Belarus

Sport
- Sport: Ice hockey

Oleg Romanov (born 31 March 1970) is a Belarusian ice hockey player. He competed in the men's tournaments at the 1998 Winter Olympics and the 2002 Winter Olympics.

== Career statistics ==
=== Regular season and playoffs ===
			Regular season					Playoffs
Season	Team	League	GP	G	A	Pts	PIM	GP	G	A	Pts	PIM
1986–87	Dinamo Minsk	URS.2	4	0	0	0	0	—	—	—	—	—
1987–88	Dinamo Minsk	URS.2	2	0	0	0	0	—	—	—	—	—
1988–89	Dinamo Minsk	URS	4	0	1	1	0	—	—	—	—	—
1988–89	Progress Grodno	URS.3	24	2	0	2	0	—	—	—	—	—
1989–90	Dinamo Minsk	URS	31	0	2	2	22	—	—	—	—	—
1989–90	Progress Grodno	URS.2	9	1	1	2	14	—	—	—	—	—
1990–91	Dinamo Minsk	URS	20	0	1	1	36	—	—	—	—	—
1991–92	Dinamo Minsk	CIS	25	0	4	4	25	—	—	—	—	—
1992–93	Dinamo Minsk	IHL	42	0	1	1	70	—	—	—	—	—
1992–93	Tivali Minsk	BLR	7	0	1	1	24	—	—	—	—	—
1993–94	Tivali Minsk	BLR	13	0	3	3	30	—	—	—	—	—
1993–94	Tivali Minsk	IHL	43	2	6	8	34	—	—	—	—	—
1994–95	Tivali Minsk	BLR	7	2	1	3	8	—	—	—	—	—
1994–95	Tivali Minsk	IHL	47	2	3	5	42	—	—	—	—	—
1995–96	Lada Togliatti	IHL	51	4	16	20	20	7	0	2	2	8
1996–97	Lada Togliatti	RSL	40	3	9	12	28	11	0	1	1	2
1997–98	Lada Togliatti	RSL	43	2	7	9	18	5	0	1	1	2
1997–98	Lada–2 Togliatti	RUS.3	1	2	2	4	0	—	—	—	—	—
1998–99	HC Chemopetrol, a.s.	ELH	41	3	6	9	52	—	—	—	—	—
1999–2000	Ak Bars Kazan	RSL	26	0	6	6	24	18	0	3	3	16
1999–2000	Ak Bars–2 Kazan	RUS.3	1	0	0	0	0	—	—	—	—	—
2000–01	SaiPa	SM-l	18	2	3	5	14	—	—	—	—	—
2000–01	Kärpät	SM-l	25	1	5	6	28	—	—	—	—	—
2001–02	Severstal Cherepovets	RSL	13	2	0	2	12	1	0	0	0	0
2001–02	Severstal–2 Cherepovets	RUS.3	9	1	2	3	2	—	—	—	—	—
2002–03	Mechel Chelyabinsk	RSL	10	0	0	0	0	—	—	—	—	—
2002–03	Mechel–2 Chelyabinsk	RUS.3	1	1	0	1	0	—	—	—	—	—
2002–03	Yunost Minsk	BLR	15	1	6	7	36	—	—	—	—	—
2003–04	CSKA Moscow	RSL	10	0	1	1	4	—	—	—	—	—
2003–04	CSKA–2 Moscow	RUS.3	8	1	2	3	4	—	—	—	—	—
2003–04	Yunost Minsk	BLR	26	2	14	16	16	10	1	1	2	10
2004–05	Dinamo Minsk	BLR	26	1	4	5	34	—	—	—	—	—
2005–06	HK Gomel	BLR	49	6	10	16	78	3	0	1	1	4
2006–07	HK Gomel	BLR	46	3	5	8	26	—	—	—	—	—
2006–07	HK–2 Gomel	BLR.2	1	1	0	1	0	—	—	—	—	—
2006–07	Keramin Minsk	BLR	3	1	1	2	4	12	1	3	4	6
IHL totals			183	8	26	34	166	7	0	2	2	8
BLR totals			192	16	45	61	256	25	2	5	7	20
RSL totals			142	7	23	30	86	35	0	5	5	20

=== International ===
Year	Team	Event	GP	G	A	Pts	PIM
1992	Belarus	WC C Q	2	0	0	0	0
1994	Belarus	WC C	6	1	2	3	2
1995	Belarus	WC C	4	0	1	1	4
1996	Belarus	WC B	7	1	1	2	6
1997	Belarus	WC B	7	1	2	3	6
1998	Belarus	OG	7	1	3	4	4
1998	Belarus	WC	6	2	3	5	4
1999	Belarus	WC	6	1	0	1	6
2000	Belarus	WC	6	0	1	1	2
2001	Belarus	OGQ	3	0	1	1	4
2001	Belarus	WC	6	1	0	1	4
2002	Belarus	OG	9	1	1	2	2
2004	Belarus	WC D1	5	0	2	2	2
Senior totals			74	9	17	26	46

"Oleg Romanov". Elite Prospects.
