= Dmitry Meleshko =

Belarusian ice hockey player

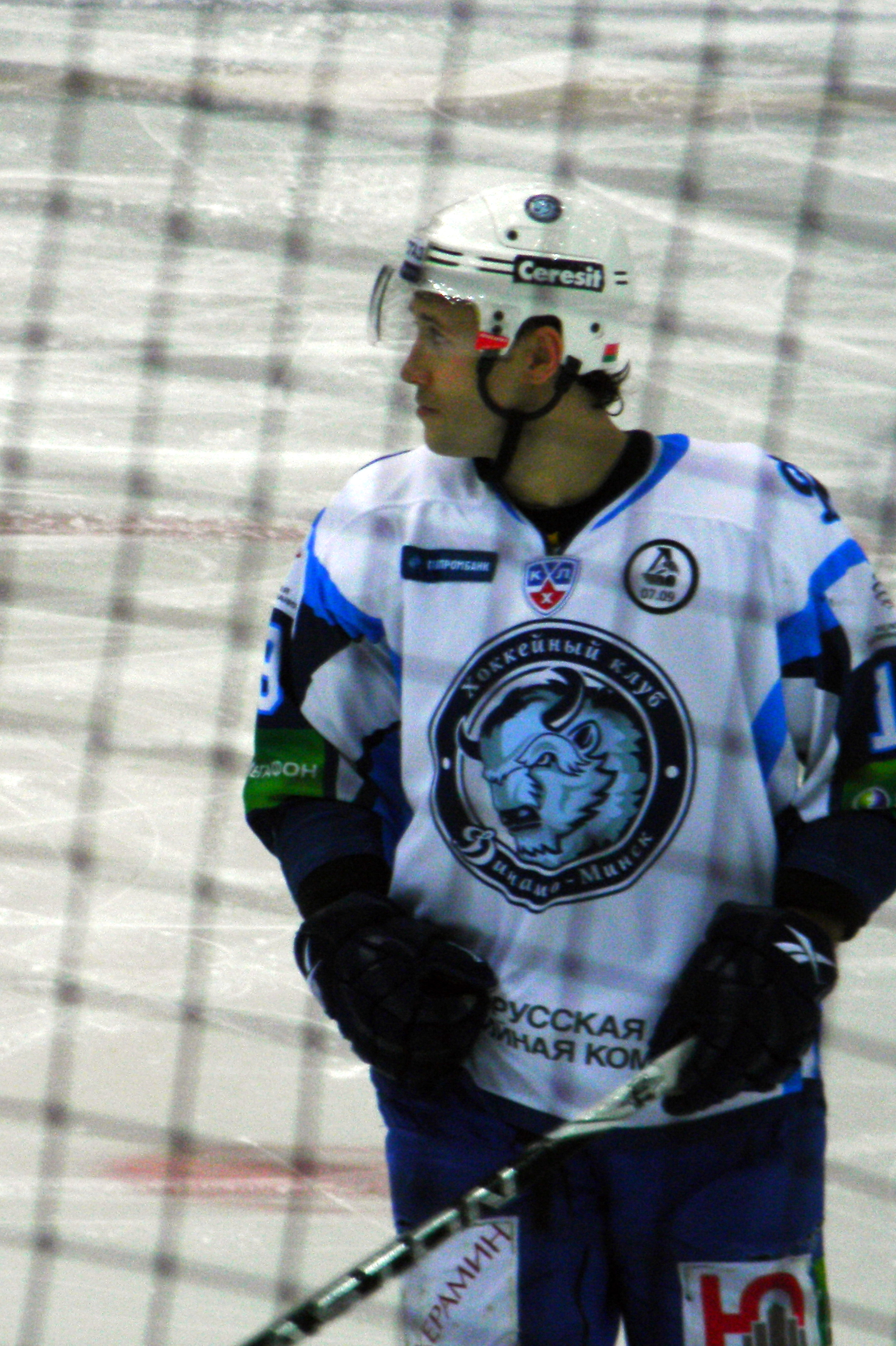
- Born: November 8, 1982 (age 43) Minsk, Byelorussian SSR, Soviet Union
- Height: 5 ft 11 in (180 cm)
- Weight: 174 lb (79 kg; 12 st 6 lb)
- Position: Right wing
- Shot: Right
- Played for: Salavat Yulaev Ufa; HC Spartak Moscow; HC Sibir Novosibirsk; HC Dinamo Minsk
- National team: Belarus
- Playing career: 2005–2017

Dmitri Viktorovich Meleshko (Belarusian: Дзміртый Віктаравіч Мялешка; born November 8, 1982) is a Belarusian former professional ice hockey winger who most notably played for HC Dinamo Minsk of the Kontinental Hockey League (KHL).

== Career statistics ==
=== Regular season and playoffs ===
			Regular season					Playoffs
Season	Team	League	GP	G	A	Pts	PIM	GP	G	A	Pts	PIM
2000–01	HK Minsk	BLR	15	2	0	2	6	—	—	—	—	—
2000–01	HK Minsk	EEHL	10	1	1	2	2	—	—	—	—	—
2000–01	Khimvolokno Mogilev	BLR	10	3	4	7	10	—	—	—	—	—
2001–02	Keramin Minsk	BLR	14	6	3	9	2	8	1	0	1	4
2001–02	Keramin Minsk	EEHL	31	8	3	11	10	—	—	—	—	—
2002–03	Keramin Minsk	BLR	38	13	14	27	14	7	2	0	2	0
2002–03	Keramin Minsk	EEHL	35	14	12	26	6	—	—	—	—	—
2002–03	Keramin–2 Minsk	BLR.2	2	8	2	10	0	—	—	—	—	—
2003–04	Keramin Minsk	BLR	44	11	15	26	14	8	2	1	3	6
2003–04	Keramin Minsk	EEHL	28	8	13	21	22	—	—	—	—	—
2004–05	Keramin Minsk	BLR	44	18	12	30	22	15	5	4	9	2
2005–06	Salavat Yulaev Ufa	RSL	50	15	9	24	16	6	1	1	2	0
2005–06	Salavat Yulaev–2 Ufa	RUS.3	2	2	1	3	0	—	—	—	—	—
2006–07	Salavat Yulaev Ufa	RSL	45	12	5	17	24	2	0	0	0	0
2007–08	Spartak Moscow	RSL	48	5	8	13	16	2	0	0	0	0
2007–08	Spartak–2 Moscow	RUS.3	6	3	0	3	4	—	—	—	—	—
2007–08	Keramin Minsk	BLR	—	—	—	—	—	4	2	1	3	2
2008–09	Sibir Novosibirsk	KHL	24	1	3	4	12	—	—	—	—	—
2008–09	Dinamo Minsk	KHL	15	2	3	5	2	—	—	—	—	—
2009–10	Dinamo Minsk	KHL	52	11	10	21	10	—	—	—	—	—
2009–10	Shakhter Soligorsk	BLR	6	7	4	11	0	—	—	—	—	—
2010–11	Dinamo Minsk	KHL	52	9	11	20	24	7	0	0	0	2
2011–12	Dinamo Minsk	KHL	54	8	7	15	12	4	0	0	0	0
2012–13	Dinamo Minsk	KHL	45	6	5	11	18	—	—	—	—	—
2013–14	Dinamo Minsk	KHL	21	2	5	7	16	—	—	—	—	—
2014–15	Dinamo Minsk	KHL	54	10	8	18	10	5	0	0	0	0
2015–16	Dinamo Minsk	KHL	59	4	4	8	2	—	—	—	—	—
2016–17	Yunost Minsk	BLR	24	6	17	23	4	—	—	—	—	—
BLR totals			195	66	69	135	72	42	12	6	18	14
RSL totals			143	32	22	54	56	8	1	1	2	0
KHL totals			380	53	56	109	106	16	0	0	0	2

=== International ===
Year	Team	Event	GP	G	A	Pts	PIM
2000	Belarus	WJC18	6	0	0	0	4
2001	Belarus	WJC	6	2	0	2	2
2002	Belarus	WJC	6	2	1	3	2
2005	Belarus	OGQ	2	1	0	1	0
2005	Belarus	WC	3	0	0	0	2
2006	Belarus	WC	7	1	2	3	4
2007	Belarus	WC	6	2	4	6	2
2008	Belarus	WC	6	2	1	3	4
2009	Belarus	WC	3	0	0	0	4
2010	Belarus	OG	4	2	0	2	2
2010	Belarus	WC	6	1	3	4	0
2011	Belarus	WC	6	1	3	4	6
2012	Belarus	WC	7	0	0	0	0
2013	Belarus	OGQ	3	1	0	1	0
2013	Belarus	WC	7	0	1	1	0
Junior totals			18	4	1	5	8
Senior totals			60	11	14	25	24
