= Aleksey Lozhkin =

Belarusian ice hockey player (born 1974)

Personal information
- Nationality: Belarusian
- Born: 21 February 1974 (age 52) Minsk, Byelorussian SSR, Soviet Union

Sport
- Sport: Ice hockey

Aleksey Lozhkin (Belarusian: Аляксей Аляксандравіч Ложкін, romanized: Aljaksej Aljaksandravich Lozhkin; born 21 February 1974) is a Belarusian ice hockey player. He competed in the men's tournament at the 1998 Winter Olympics.

== Career statistics ==
=== Regular season and playoffs ===
			Regular season					Playoffs
Season	Team	League	GP	G	A	Pts	PIM	GP	G	A	Pts	PIM
1990–91	Progress Grodno	URS.2	2	0	0	0	0	—	—	—	—	—
1991–92	Khimik Novopolotsk	CIS.3	29	1	1	2	2	—	—	—	—	—
1992–93	Dinamo Minsk	RUS	37	1	2	3	6	—	—	—	—	—
1992–93	Tivali Minsk	BLR	10	6	3	9	2	—	—	—	—	—
1993–94	Chicoutimi Saguenéens	QMJHL	66	40	67	107	68	—	—	—	—	—
1994–95	Chicoutimi Saguenéens	QMJHL	57	43	58	101	26	11	6	5	11	2
1994–95	Tallahassee Tiger Sharks	ECHL	1	3	1	4	0	—	—	—	—	—
1995–96	Fredericton Canadiens	AHL	73	24	33	57	16	7	1	3	4	0
1996–97	Fredericton Canadiens	AHL	79	33	56	89	41	—	—	—	—	—
1997–98	Fredericton Canadiens	AHL	61	13	22	35	18	2	0	1	1	0
1998–99	Fredericton Canadiens	AHL	71	20	20	40	16	—	—	—	—	—
1998–99	Grand Rapids Griffins	IHL	10	1	2	3	4	—	—	—	—	—
1999–2000	Yunost Minsk	EEHL	2	0	1	1	0	—	—	—	—	—
1999–2000	HK Minsk	BLR	2	0	1	1	0	—	—	—	—	—
1999–2000	Pelicans	SM-l	3	0	2	2	2	—	—	—	—	—
1999–2000	Manchester Storm	GBR	17	6	11	17	2	6	0	3	3	6
2000–01	Amur Khabarovsk	RSL	10	2	1	3	2	—	—	—	—	—
2001–02	Metallurg Novokuznetsk	RSL	7	2	1	3	4	—	—	—	—	—
2001–02	Frederikshavn White Hawks	DEN	18	8	6	14	12	—	—	—	—	—
2002–03	Yunost Minsk	BLR	32	5	14	19	10	—	—	—	—	—
2003–04	Keramin Minsk	BLR	45	10	27	37	26	8	3	2	5	0
2003–04	Keramin Minsk	EEHL	30	13	17	30	18	—	—	—	—	—
2004–05	Keramin Minsk	BLR	29	2	7	9	12	14	2	2	4	4
2005–06	Keramin Minsk	BLR	55	9	14	23	32	4	0	0	0	2
2006–07	Keramin Minsk	BLR	50	8	24	32	34	12	1	2	3	16
2007–08	Dinamo Minsk	BLR	47	9	13	22	20	4	1	1	2	4
2008–09	Metallurg Zhlobin	BLR	18	5	8	13	6	7	1	4	5	2
2009–10	Metallurg Zhlobin	BLR	45	6	4	10	8	—	—	—	—	—
BLR totals			333	60	115	175	150	49	8	11	19	28
AHL totals			284	90	131	221	91	9	1	4	5	0

=== International ===
Year	Team	Event	GP	G	A	Pts	PIM
1997	Belarus	WC B	4	3	2	5	2
1998	Belarus	OG	7	0	2	2	0
1998	Belarus	WC	6	1	0	1	2
Senior totals			17	4	4	8	4

"Alexei Lozhkin". Elite Prospects.
