= Sergey Yerkovich =

Belarusian ice hockey player

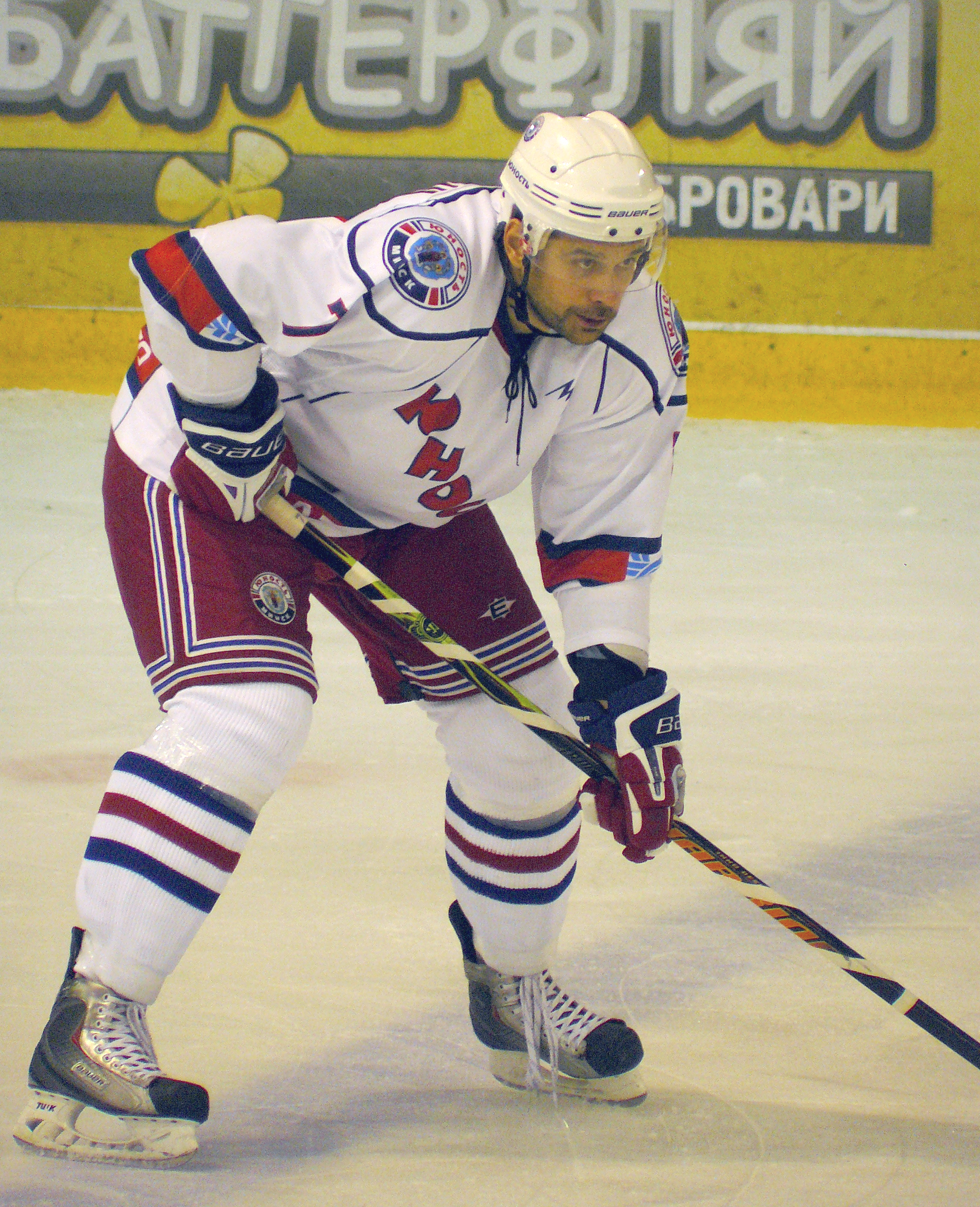
- Sergey Yerkovich

Personal information
- Nationality: Belarusian
- Born: 9 March 1974 (age 51); Minsk, Belarus

Sport
- Sport: Ice hockey

Sergey Yerkovich (born 9 March 1974) is a Belarusian ice hockey player. He competed in the men's tournament at the 1998 Winter Olympics.

== Career statistics ==
=== Regular season and playoffs ===
			Regular season					Playoffs
Season	Team	League	GP	G	A	Pts	PIM	GP	G	A	Pts	PIM
1991–92	Khimik Novopolotsk	CIS.3	5	1	0	1	6	—	—	—	—	—
1992–93	Khimik Novopolotsk	BLR	8	0	1	1	12	—	—	—	—	—
1992–93	Khimik Novopolotsk	RUS.2	49	1	3	4	58	—	—	—	—	—
1992–93	Khimik–2 Novopolotsk	BLR	2	0	0	0	0	—	—	—	—	—
1992–93	Dinamo Minsk	RUS	1	0	0	0	0	—	—	—	—	—
1993–94	Tivali Minsk	BLR	15	0	1	1	20	—	—	—	—	—
1993–94	Tivali Minsk	RUS	39	2	1	3	34	—	—	—	—	—
1994–95	Tivali Minsk	BLR	9	0	0	0	41	—	—	—	—	—
1994–95	Tivali Minsk	RUS	45	3	1	4	52	—	—	—	—	—
1995–96	Tivali Minsk	BLR	6	1	3	4	10	—	—	—	—	—
1995–96	Tivali Minsk	RUS	41	5	3	8	30	—	—	—	—	—
1996–97	Las Vegas Thunder	IHL	76	6	19	25	167	—	—	—	—	—
1997–98	Las Vegas Thunder	IHL	69	7	15	22	130	4	0	0	0	6
1998–99	Hamilton Bulldogs	AHL	69	7	11	18	103	8	0	2	2	2
1999–2000	Hamilton Bulldogs	AHL	72	2	28	30	64	10	1	3	4	16
2000–01	Torpedo Yaroslavl	RSL	23	2	4	6	66	—	—	—	—	—
2000–01	Torpedo–2 Yaroslavl	RUS.3	2	1	1	2	0	—	—	—	—	—
2000–01	Metallurg Novokuznetsk	RSL	12	0	1	1	16	—	—	—	—	—
2001–02	Metallurg Novokuznetsk	RSL	18	0	1	1	30	—	—	—	—	—
2001–02	Metallurg–2 Novokuznetsk	RUS.3	6	5	1	6	4	—	—	—	—	—
2002–03	TPS	SM-l	40	2	1	3	61	2	0	0	0	12
2003–04	Khimik Voskresensk	RSL	56	2	8	10	95	—	—	—	—	—
2003–04	Khimik–2 Voskresensk	RUS.3	2	1	0	1	0	—	—	—	—	—
2003–04	Yunost Minsk	BLR	—	—	—	—	—	2	0	0	0	2
2004–05	Yunost Minsk	BLR	39	6	7	13	97	12	2	4	6	22
2005–06	Yunost Minsk	BLR	25	3	5	8	52	10	0	2	2	26
2006–07	Yunost Minsk	BLR	40	4	12	16	109	9	1	2	3	20
2007–08	Yunost Minsk	BLR	39	2	11	13	36	10	0	0	0	51
2008–09	HK Gomel	BLR	41	6	12	18	127	14	2	2	4	16
2009–10	Yunost Minsk	BLR	40	4	14	18	42	10	1	2	3	10
2010–11	Yunost Minsk	BLR	40	3	9	12	48	13	0	6	6	24
RUS & RSL totals			235	14	19	33	323	—	—	—	—	—
AHL totals			141	9	39	48	167	18	1	5	6	18
BLR totals			304	29	75	104	594	80	6	18	24	171

=== International ===
Year	Team	Event	GP	G	A	Pts	PIM
1994	Belarus	WC C	4	0	0	0	2
1996	Belarus	WC B	7	1	0	1	6
1997	Belarus	OGQ	3	1	1	2	4
1998	Belarus	OG	6	2	0	2	16
1998	Belarus	WC	6	0	1	1	4
2001	Belarus	OGQ	3	0	0	0	0
2001	Belarus	WC	6	0	2	2	6
2003	Belarus	WC	6	0	0	0	12
2004	Belarus	WC D1	4	0	2	2	29
2005	Belarus	OGQ	3	0	0	0	2
2005	Belarus	WC	4	1	1	2	2
2006	Belarus	WC	7	0	1	1	8
2007	Belarus	WC	2	0	0	0	4
Senior totals			61	5	8	13	95

"Sergei Yerkovich". Elite Prospects.
