= Andrei Skabelka =

Belarusian ice hockey player and coach

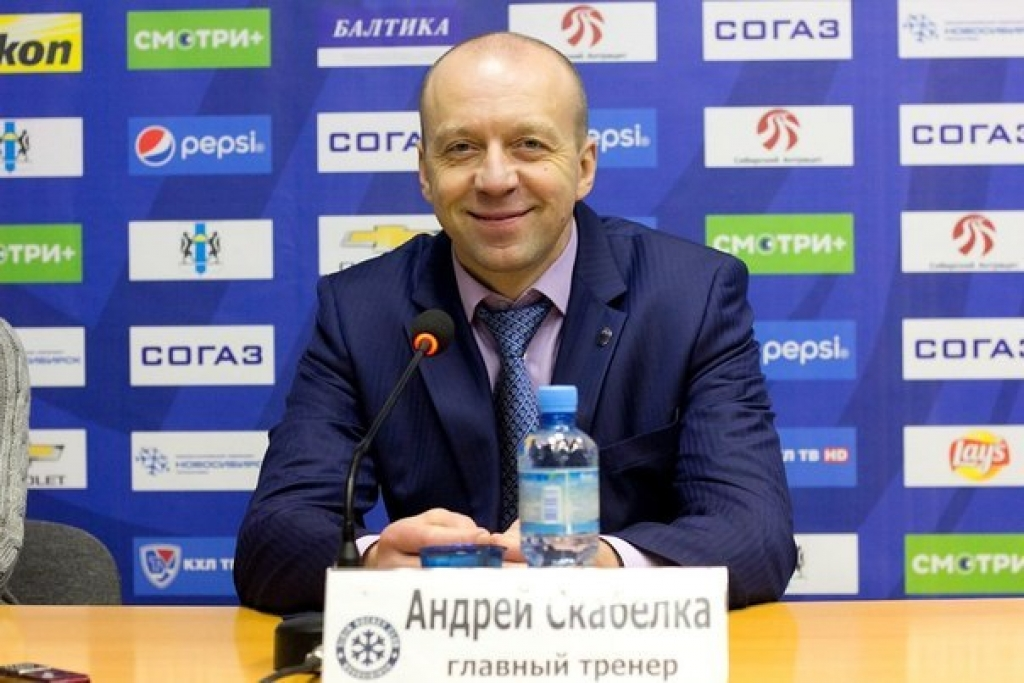
- Born: January 20, 1971 (age 55) Minsk, Byelorussian SSR
- Height: 6 ft 1 in (185 cm)
- Weight: 203 lb (92 kg; 14 st 7 lb)
- Position: Right wing
- Shot: Left
- Played for: HC CSKA Moscow; HC Dinamo Minsk; Tivali Minsk; Lokomotiv Yaroslavl; Ak Bars Kazan; HC Lada Togliatti; Salavat Yulaev Ufa; HC Sibir Novosibirsk
- National team: Belarus
- NHL draft: Undrafted
- Playing career: 1992–2007

Andrei Vladimirovich Skabelka (Belarusian: Андрэй Уладзіміравіч Скабелка, romanized: Andrej Uładzimiravič Skabiełka; born January 20, 1971) is a Belarusian ice hockey coach and former player. He most recently was the head coach with Barys Nur-Sultan of the Kontinental Hockey League (KHL).

Skabelka was the head coach of the Belarus men's national ice hockey team at the 2013 IIHF World Championship.

== Career statistics ==
=== Regular season and playoffs ===
			Regular season					Playoffs
Season	Team	League	GP	G	A	Pts	PIM	GP	G	A	Pts	PIM
1988–89	CSKA Moscow	URS	2	0	0	0	0	—	—	—	—	—
1988–89	SKA MVO Kalinin	URS.2	3	0	0	0	2	—	—	—	—	—
1988–89	MCOP Moscow	URS.3	4	0	0	0	0	—	—	—	—	—
1989–90	SKA Khabarovsk	URS.2	57	15	10	25	22	—	—	—	—	—
1990–91	SKA Khabarovsk	URS.2	48	13	10	23	10	—	—	—	—	—
1991–92	SKA Khabarovsk	CIS.2	40	15	18	33	8	—	—	—	—	—
1992–93	Dinamo Minsk	IHL	40	5	4	9	21	—	—	—	—	—
1992–93	Tivali Minsk	BLR	9	8	5	13	6	—	—	—	—	—
1993–94	Tivali Minsk	IHL	45	23	9	32	16	—	—	—	—	—
1993–94	Tivali Minsk	BLR	16	21	9	30	14	—	—	—	—	—
1994–95	Tivali Minsk	IHL	49	12	12	24	18	—	—	—	—	—
1994–95	Tivali Minsk	BLR	9	12	11	23	6	—	—	—	—	—
1995–96	Torpedo Yaroslavl	IHL	52	16	13	29	28	—	—	—	—	—
1996–97	Torpedo Yaroslavl	RSL	29	13	15	28	12	—	—	—	—	—
1997–98	Torpedo Yaroslavl	RSL	39	6	17	23	18	—	—	—	—	—
1998–99	Ak Bars Kazan	RSL	35	6	12	18	6	13	3	5	8	0
1999–2000	Lada Togliatti	RSL	38	13	16	29	18	—	—	—	—	—
2000–01	Lada Togliatti	RSL	43	8	17	25	18	—	—	—	—	—
2001–02	Lada Togliatti	RSL	3	0	0	0	0	—	—	—	—	—
2001–02	Salavat Yulaev Ufa	RSL	27	6	14	20	14	—	—	—	—	—
2002–03	Salavat Yulaev Ufa	RSL	49	5	10	15	22	2	0	1	1	2
2003–04	Salavat Yulaev Ufa	RSL	47	8	5	13	26	—	—	—	—	—
2004–05	Yunost Minsk	BLR	3	1	0	1	0	12	5	3	8	4
2004–05	Sibir Novosibirsk	RSL	15	3	2	5	0	—	—	—	—	—
2005–06	Dinamo Minsk	BLR	23	7	16	23	18	10	3	9	12	10
2006–07	Dinamo Minsk	BLR	33	9	18	27	24	12	4	8	12	10
USSR II totals			148	43	38	81	42	—	—	—	—	—
IHL totals			186	56	38	94	83	—	—	—	—	—
RSL totals			325	68	108	176	134	15	3	6	8	2

=== International ===
Year	Team	Event	GP	G	A	Pts	PIM
1994	Belarus	WC C	6	4	4	8	4
1995	Belarus	WC C	4	0	3	3	0
1996	Belarus	WC B	7	3	1	4	2
1997	Belarus	WC B	7	7	5	12	2
1998	Belarus	OG	7	2	2	4	0
1998	Belarus	WC	6	1	2	3	0
1999	Belarus	WC	6	0	2	2	4
2000	Belarus	WC	5	0	3	3	2
2001	Belarus	OGQ	3	1	1	2	0
2001	Belarus	WC	6	1	1	2	2
2002	Belarus	OG	2	0	1	1	0
2002	Belarus	WC D1	5	3	1	4	2
2004	Belarus	WC D1	5	4	6	10	2
2005	Belarus	WC	6	0	2	2	0
2006	Belarus	WC	7	2	7	9	8
Senior totals			82	28	41	69	28
