= Aleksandr Alekseyev (ice hockey, born 1968) =

Belarusian ice hockey player (born 1968)

- Born: 8 January 1968 (age 57) Ufa, Soviet Union
- National team: Belarus

Aleksandr Yurievich Alekseyev (born 8 January 1968) is a Belarusian ice hockey player. He competed in the men's tournament at the 1998 Winter Olympics.

== Career statistics ==
=== Regular season and playoffs ===
			Regular season					Playoffs
Season	Team	League	GP	G	A	Pts	PIM	GP	G	A	Pts	PIM
1985–86	Avangard Ufa	URS.3		1				—	—	—	—	—
1986–87	SKA Sverdlovsk	URS.2	16	0	0	0	2	—	—	—	—	—
1987–88	Dinamo Minsk	URS.2	20	0	1	1	8	—	—	—	—	—
1988–89	Salavat Yulaev Ufa	URS.2	28	3	6	9	6	—	—	—	—	—
1989–90	Progress Grodno	URS.2	68	9	21	30	60	—	—	—	—	—
1990–91	Progress Grodno	URS.2	14	5	3	8	20	—	—	—	—	—
1990–91	Dinamo Minsk	URS	14	0	2	2	6	—	—	—	—	—
1991–92	Dinamo Minsk	CIS	29	4	3	7	32	—	—	—	—	—
1992–93	Dinamo Minsk	IHL	22	5	3	8	18	—	—	—	—	—
1992–93	Tivali Minsk	BLR	1	2	0	2	0	—	—	—	—	—
1993–94	Podhale Nowy Targ	POL
1995–96	Polimir Novopolotsk	BLR	4	3	1	4	6	—	—	—	—	—
1995–96	CSKA Moscow	IHL	40	1	3	4	8	—	—	—	—	—
1995–96	CSKA–2 Moscow	RUS.2	1	0	0	0	0	—	—	—	—	—
1996–97	Team Kiruna IF	SWE.2	31	9	19	28	65	5	0	0	0	0
1997–98	Rungsted Cobras	DEN	41	8	23	31	14	—	—	—	—	—
1998–99	Rungsted Cobras	DEN	37	12	19	31	24	—	—	—	—	—
1999–2000	Rungsted Cobras	DEN	38	9	17	26	86	—	—	—	—	—
2000–01	Vityaz Podolsk	RSL	4	0	1	1	2	—	—	—	—	—
2000–01	Vityaz–2 Podolsk	RUS.3	2	0	1	1	0	—	—	—	—	—
2000–01	Dinamo–Energija Yekaterinburg	RSL	8	0	1	1	4	—	—	—	—	—
2001–02	Rødovre Mighty Bulls	DEN	40	3	20	23	36	—	—	—	—	—
2002–03	HK Gomel	BLR	42	7	20	27	14	6	3	3	6	8
2002–03	HK Gomel	EEHL	34	5	6	11	12	—	—	—	—	—
2003–04	HK Gomel	BLR	43	14	23	37	22	9	0	0	0	6
2003–04	HK Gomel	EEHL	32	14	7	21	16	—	—	—	—	—
2004–05	Yunost Minsk	BLR	24	4	7	11	18	—	—	—	—	—
URS.2 totals			146	17	31	48	96	—	—	—	—	—
BLR totals			114	30	51	81	60	15	3	3	6	14
DEN totals			156	32	79	111	160	—	—	—	—	—

=== International ===
Year	Team	Event	GP	G	A	Pts	PIM
1992	Belarus	WC C Q	2	0	1	1
1995	Belarus	WC C	4	1	1	2	2
1996	Belarus	WC B	7	0	5	5	2
1997	Belarus	WC B	7	0	2	2	0
1998	Belarus	OG	7	1	1	2	0
2002	Belarus	WC D1	5	1	2	3	2
2003	Belarus	WC	6	0	1	1	0
2004	Belarus	WC D1	5	0	1	1	2
Senior totals			43	3	14	17	8

"Alexander Alexeyev". Elite Prospects.
