= Oleg Mikulchik =

Belarusian ice hockey player

- Born: June 27, 1964 (age 60); Minsk, Byelorussian SSR, Soviet Union
- Height: 6 ft 2 in (188 cm)
- Weight: 183 lb (83 kg; 13 st 1 lb)
- Position: Defence
- Shot: Right
- Played for: Winnipeg Jets; Mighty Ducks of Anaheim
- National team: Belarus
- NHL draft: Undrafted
- Playing career: 1983–2003

Oleg Antonovich Mikulchik (Russian: Олег Антонович Микульчик; born June 27, 1964) is a Belarusian former professional ice hockey played in the National Hockey League for the Winnipeg Jets and the Mighty Ducks of Anaheim. Mikulchik played 37 regular season games, scoring 3 assists and collecting 37 penalty minutes. He represented the Soviet Union at the 1984 World Junior Ice Hockey Championships and Belarus at several World Championships and at the 2002 Winter Olympics.

== Career statistics ==
=== Regular season and playoffs ===
			Regular season					Playoffs
Season	Team	League	GP	G	A	Pts	PIM	GP	G	A	Pts	PIM
1981–82	Dinamo Minsk	USSR-2	5	0	2	2	0	—	—	—	—	—
1982–83	Dinamo Minsk	USSR-2	57	7	—	—	—	—	—	—	—	—
1983–84	Dynamo Moscow	USSR	17	0	0	0	6	—	—	—	—	—
1984–85	Dynamo Moscow	USSR	30	1	3	4	26	—	—	—	—	—
1985–86	Dynamo Moscow	USSR	40	0	1	1	36	—	—	—	—	—
1986–87	Dynamo Moscow	USSR	39	5	3	8	34	—	—	—	—	—
1987–88	Dynamo Moscow	USSR	48	7	8	15	63	—	—	—	—	—
1988–89	Dynamo Moscow	USSR	43	4	7	11	52	—	—	—	—	—
1989–90	Dynamo Moscow	USSR	32	1	3	4	31	—	—	—	—	—
1990–91	Dynamo Moscow	USSR	36	2	6	8	40	—	—	—	—	—
1991–92	Khimik Voskresensk	USSR	15	3	2	5	20	—	—	—	—	—
1991–92	New Haven Nighthawks	AHL	30	3	3	6	63	4	1	3	4	6
1992–93	Moncton Hawks	AHL	75	6	20	26	159	5	0	0	0	4
1993–94	Winnipeg Jets	NHL	4	0	1	1	17	—	—	—	—	—
1993–94	Moncton Hawks	AHL	67	9	38	47	121	21	2	10	12	18
1994–95	Winnipeg Jets	NHL	25	0	2	2	12	—	—	—	—	—
1994–95	Springfield Falcons	AHL	50	5	16	21	59	—	—	—	—	—
1995–96	Mighty Ducks of Anaheim	NHL	8	0	0	0	4	—	—	—	—	—
1995–96	Baltimore Bandits	AHL	19	1	7	8	46	12	2	3	5	22
1996–97	Long Beach Ice Dogs	IHL	16	0	5	5	29	—	—	—	—	—
1996–97	Fort Wayne Komets	IHL	51	5	13	18	75	—	—	—	—	—
1997–98	Nuremberg Ice Tigers	DEL	37	3	15	18	134	5	1	0	1	40
1998–99	Metallurg Magnitogorsk	RSL	38	1	3	4	108	16	2	2	4	48
1999–00	Metallurg Magnitogorsk	RSL	22	1	8	9	57	11	2	1	3	12
2000–01	Krylya Sovetov Moscow	RUS-2	34	1	11	12	86	11	1	5	6	10
2001–02	Khimik Voskresensk	RUS-2	25	4	5	9	44	12	1	1	2	12
2002–03	Mechel Chelyabinsk	RSL	8	0	1	1	36	—	—	—	—	—
2002–03	Neftekhimik Nizhnekamsk	RSL	16	1	4	5	40	—	—	—	—	—
2003–04	Yunost Minsk	BLR	36	3	16	19	85	10	0	3	3	14
2004–05	Yunost Minsk	BLR	38	3	13	16	66	8	1	1	2	6
2005–06	Yunost Minsk	BLR	10	1	1	2	26	—	—	—	—	—
2005–06	Dinamo Minsk	BLR	23	6	10	16	40	9	1	3	4	30
2006–07	Dinamo Minsk	BLR	10	0	5	5	24	—	—	—	—	—
USSR/RSL totals			384	26	49	75	546	27	4	3	7	60
NHL totals			37	0	3	3	33	—	—	—	—	—

=== International ===
Year	Team	Event	GP	G	A	Pts	PIM
1982	Soviet Union	EJC	5	0	0	0	2
1984	Soviet Union	WJC	7	0	3	3	2
1998	Belarus	WC	6	0	1	1	12
1999	Belarus	WC	6	0	0	0	6
2001	Belarus	WC	6	0	0	0	2
2002	Belarus	Oly	9	1	0	1	14
2005	Belarus	WC	6	0	1	1	2
Junior totals			12	0	3	3	4
Senior totals			33	1	2	3	36
