= Vasili Pankov =

Belarusian ice hockey player

- Born: 15 August 1968 (age 56); Minsk, Belarusian SSR, USSR
- Height: 6 ft 0 in (183 cm)
- Weight: 187 lb (85 kg; 13 st 5 lb)
- Position: Centre
- Shot: Left
- Played for: Yunost Minsk; Augsburger Panther; Slovan Bratislava; Lada Togliatti; Tivali Minsk
- National team: Belarus
- Playing career: 1986–2003

Vasili Nikolaevich Pankov (Belarusian: Васіль Мікалаевіч Панкоў; Russian: Василий Николаевич Панков; born 15 August 1968) is a Belarusian former ice hockey player. He played for Yunost Minsk, Augsburger Panther, Slovan Bratislava, Lada Togliatti, and Tivali Minsk during his career. He also played for the Belarusian national team at the 1998 and 2002 Winter Olympics, and multiple World Championships. Pankov was tested positive for 19-Norandrosterone and retroactively disqualified for the 2002 Winter Olympics. After his playing career he turned to coaching.

== Career statistics ==
=== Regular season and playoffs ===
			Regular season					Playoffs
Season	Team	League	GP	G	A	Pts	PIM	GP	G	A	Pts	PIM
1986–87	Dinamo Minsk	URS.2	52	16	2	18	33	—	—	—	—	—
1987–88	Dinamo Minsk	URS.2	62	8	8	16	24	—	—	—	—	—
1988–89	Dinamo Minsk	URS	14	1	0	1	4	—	—	—	—	—
1989–90	Dinamo Minsk	URS	40	2	2	4	26	—	—	—	—	—
1990–91	Dinamo Minsk	URS	20	5	0	5	4	—	—	—	—	—
1991–92	Dinamo Minsk	CIS	25	3	3	6	0	—	—	—	—	—
1992–93	Dinamo Minsk	IHL	42	9	5	14	24	—	—	—	—	—
1992–93	Tivali Minsk	BLR	11	7	5	12	10	—	—	—	—	—
1993–94	Tivali Minsk	BLR	14	5	13	18	46	—	—	—	—	—
1993–94	Tivali Minsk	IHL	43	5	10	15	44	—	—	—	—	—
1994–95	Tivali Minsk	BLR	10	7	6	13	2	—	—	—	—	—
1994–95	Tivali Minsk	IHL	50	10	10	20	49	—	—	—	—	—
1995–96	Lada Togliatti	IHL	52	18	11	29	24	7	3	2	5	8
1996–97	Lada Togliatti	RSL	41	11	18	29	26	11	2	2	4	10
1997–98	HC Slovan Bratislava	SVK	46	16	23	39	55	—	—	—	—	—
1998–99	HC Slovan Bratislava	SVK	51	15	33	48	57	—	—	—	—	—
1999–2000	HC Slovan Bratislava	SVK	55	22	30	52	48	8	0	5	5	4
2000–01	Augsburger Panther	DEL	46	12	23	35	63	—	—	—	—	—
2001–02	Augsburger Panther	DEL	26	4	10	14	28	4	1	0	1	6
2002–03	Yunost Minsk	BLR	32	3	5	8	26	—	—	—	—	—
URS/CIS totals			99	11	5	16	34	—	—	—	—	—
IHL totals			187	42	36	78	141	7	3	2	5	8
SVK totals			152	53	86	139	160	8	0	5	5	4

=== International ===
Year	Team	Event	GP	G	A	Pts	PIM
1992	Belarus	WC C Q	2	1	0	1
1994	Belarus	WC C	6	4	2	6	8
1995	Belarus	WC C	4	4	2	6	4
1994	Belarus	WC B	7	2	1	3	8
1997	Belarus	WC B	7	4	2	6	33
1998	Belarus	OG	7	1	0	1	6
1998	Belarus	WC	6	1	4	5	10
1999	Belarus	WC	6	2	1	3	31
2000	Belarus	WC	6	1	1	2	4
2001	Belarus	WC	6	1	3	4	35
2002	Belarus	OG	9	1	1	2	4
Senior totals			66	22	17	39	143
