= Oleg Khmyl =

Belarusian ice hockey player

Personal information
- Nationality: Belarusian
- Born: 30 January 1970 (age 55); Minsk, Belarus

Sport
- Sport: Ice hockey

Oleg Khmyl (born 30 January 1970) is a Belarusian ice hockey player. He competed in the men's tournaments at the 1998 Winter Olympics and the 2002 Winter Olympics.

== Career statistics ==
=== Regular season and playoffs ===
			Regular season					Playoffs
Season	Team	League	GP	G	A	Pts	PIM	GP	G	A	Pts	PIM
1986–87	Dinamo Minsk	URS.2	4	0	0	0	0	—	—	—	—	—
1987–88	Dinamo Minsk	URS.2	2	0	0	0	2	—	—	—	—	—
1987–88	SKIF–ShVSM Minsk	URS.3		5				—	—	—	—	—
1988–89	Dinamo Minsk	URS	20	0	1	1	8	—	—	—	—	—
1988–89	Progress Grodno	URS.3	16	1	0	1	10	—	—	—	—	—
1989–90	Dinamo Minsk	URS	13	1	0	1	0	—	—	—	—	—
1989–90	Progress Grodno	URS.2	10	0	3	3	8	—	—	—	—	—
1990–91	Progress Grodno	URS.2	63	9	10	19	44	—	—	—	—	—
1991–92	Dinamo Minsk	CIS	28	0	1	1	10	—	—	—	—	—
1992–93	Dinamo Minsk	IHL	42	1	7	8	32	—	—	—	—	—
1992–93	Tivali Minsk	BLR	11	4	2	6	10	—	—	—	—	—
1993–94	Tivali Minsk	BLR	16	6	4	10	18	—	—	—	—	—
1993–94	Tivali Minsk	IHL	43	7	6	13	12	—	—	—	—	—
1994–95	Tivali Minsk	BLR	10	2	10	12	0	—	—	—	—	—
1994–95	Tivali Minsk	IHL	48	4	12	16	20	—	—	—	—	—
1995–96	Lada Togliatti	IHL	42	2	7	9	49	7	0	2	2	4
1996–97	Lada Togliatti	RSL	39	4	14	18	16	11	0	4	4	8
1996–97	Lada–2 Togliatti	RUS.3	2	0	1	1	0	—	—	—	—	—
1997–98	Lada Togliatti	RSL	29	4	6	10	18	4	0	0	0	6
1997–98	Lada–2 Togliatti	RUS.3	4	0	3	3	0	—	—	—	—	—
1998–99	Lada Togliatti	RSL	32	3	2	5	18	7	0	1	1	10
1998–99	CSK VVS Samara	RSL	2	0	1	1	2	—	—	—	—	—
1999–2000	Lada Togliatti	RSL	38	5	13	18	30	7	1	1	2	4
2000–01	Lada Togliatti	RSL	42	1	8	9	26	5	2	1	3	4
2001–02	Lada Togliatti	RSL	27	0	2	2	16	—	—	—	—	—
2001–02	Lada–2 Togliatti	RUS.3	1	0	1	1	0	—	—	—	—	—
2002–03	Neftekhimik Nizhnekamsk	RSL	38	2	6	8	22	—	—	—	—	—
2002–03	Neftekhimik–2 Nizhnekamsk	RUS.3	3	0	6	6	0	—	—	—	—	—
2003–04	Neftekhimik Nizhnekamsk	RSL	49	1	8	9	28	5	0	0	0	6
2003–04	Neftekhimik–2 Nizhnekamsk	RUS.3	2	1	0	1	0	—	—	—	—	—
2004–05	HC MVD	RUS.2	51	2	18	20	42	13	2	9	11	8
2005–06	Dinamo Minsk	BLR	54	6	22	28	52	10	1	8	9	6
2006–07	Dinamo Minsk	BLR	46	4	22	26	38	12	2	4	6	4
2007–08	Yunost Minsk	BLR	43	1	15	16	26	11	0	0	0	8
2008–09	Yunost Minsk	BLR	41	1	16	17	24	13	1	3	4	16
IHL totals			175	14	32	46	113	7	0	2	2	4
BLR totals			221	24	91	115	168	46	4	15	19	34
RSL totals			296	20	60	80	176	39	3	7	10	38

=== International ===
Year	Team	Event	GP	G	A	Pts	PIM
1992	Belarus	WC C Q	2	0	0	0	0
1994	Belarus	WC C	6	4	3	7	4
1995	Belarus	WC C	4	0	3	3	2
1996	Belarus	WC B	6	0	1	1	26
1997	Belarus	WC B	7	1	4	5	4
1998	Belarus	OG	7	0	2	2	4
1998	Belarus	WC	6	0	1	1	4
1999	Belarus	WC	6	1	2	3	6
2000	Belarus	WC	6	2	0	2	4
2001	Belarus	OGQ	3	1	1	2	4
2001	Belarus	WC	6	0	1	1	4
2002	Belarus	OG	9	1	3	4	0
2002	Belarus	WC D1	5	1	6	7	2
2003	Belarus	WC	6	0	1	1	10
2004	Belarus	WC D1	5	0	4	4	2
2005	Belarus	OGQ	3	0	1	1	4
Senior totals			87	11	33	44	80

"Oleg Khmyl". Elite Prospects.
