= Aleksandr Alekseyev =

Aleksandr Alekseyev (Алексеев, Александр) or Alexander Alexeev may refer to:

- Aleksandr Alekseyev (boxer) (born 1981), Russian cruiserweight boxer
- Aleksandr Alekseyev (footballer), (born 1989), Russian footballer
- Alexander Alexeyev (diplomat) (1913–1989), Soviet intelligence agent
- Alexander Alexeyev (ice hockey) (born 1999), Russian ice hockey player
- Aleksandr Alekseyev (ice hockey, born 1968), Belarusian ice hockey player
- Alexandre Alexeieff (1901–1982), Russian-born French illustrator
- Alexander Alexeev (conductor), (1938–2020), Russian conductor
