= 1995–96 Belarusian Extraliga season =

Ice hockey season

1995–96 Extraliga
- League: Extraliga
- Sport: Ice hockey
- Teams: 4

Regular season
- Champions: Polimir Novopolotsk
- Runners-up: Tivali Minsk

Belarusian Extraliga seasons
- ← 1994–95 1996–97 →

The 1995–96 Belarusian Extraliga season was the fourth season of the Belarusian Extraliga, the top level of ice hockey in Belarus. Four teams participated in the league, and Polimir Novopolotsk won the championship.

== Standings ==
	Club	G	W	T	L	GF:GA	Pts
1.	Polimir Novopolotsk	6	5	0	1	28:14	10
2.	Tivali Minsk	6	4	0	2	19:15	8
3.	HK Neman Grodno	6	3	0	3	22:17	6
4.	Belstal Zhlobin	6	0	0	6	6:29	0
