= 1997–98 Belarusian Extraliga season =

Ice hockey season

1997–98 Extraliga
- League: Extraliga
- Sport: Ice hockey
- Teams: 4

Regular season
- Champions: HK Neman Grodno
- Runners-up: Polimir Novopolotsk

Belarusian Extraliga seasons
- ← 1996–97 1998–99 →

The 1997–98 Belarusian Extraliga season was the sixth season of the Belarusian Extraliga, the top level of ice hockey in Belarus. Four teams participated in the league, and HK Neman Grodno won the championship.

== Standings ==
	Club	G	W	T	L	GF:GA	Pts
1.	HK Neman Grodno	18	14	3	1	72:30	31
2.	Polimir Novopolotsk	18	11	3	4	64:46	25
3.	Tivali Minsk	18	5	1	12	44:70	11
4.	HK Yunost Minsk	18	2	1	15	47:81	5
