= 1996–97 Belarusian Extraliga season =

Ice hockey season

1996–97 Extraliga
- League: Extraliga
- Sport: Ice hockey
- Teams: 4

Regular season
- Champions: Polimir Novopolotsk
- Runners-up: Tivali Minsk

Belarusian Extraliga seasons
- ← 1995–96 1997–98 →

The 1996–97 Belarusian Extraliga season was the fifth season of the Belarusian Extraliga, the top level of ice hockey in Belarus. Four teams participated in the league, and Polimir Novopolotsk won the championship.

== Standings ==
	Club	G	W	T	L	GF:GA	Pts
1.	Polimir Novopolotsk	12	9	2	1	68:21	20
2.	Tivali Minsk	12	4	4	4	25:30	12
3.	HK Neman Grodno	12	5	2	5	36:34	12
4.	HK Yunost Minsk	12	0	4	8	25:69	4
