= 1998–99 Belarusian Extraliga season =

Ice hockey season

1998–99 Extraliga
- League: Extraliga
- Sport: Ice hockey
- Teams: 4

Regular season
- Champions: HK Neman Grodno
- Runners-up: HK Yunost Minsk

Belarusian Extraliga seasons
- ← 1997–98 1999–2000 →

The 1998–99 Belarusian Extraliga season was the seventh season of the Belarusian Extraliga, the top level of ice hockey in Belarus. Four teams participated in the league, and HK Neman Grodno won the championship.

== Standings ==
	Club	G	GF:GA	Pts
1.	HK Neman Grodno	18	70:59	21
2.	HK Yunost Minsk	18	71:63	18
3.	Polimir Novopolotsk	18	54:51	18
4.	Tivali Minsk	18	45:67	15
