= 1999–2000 Belarusian Extraliga season =

Ice hockey season

1999–2000 Extraliga
- League: Extraliga
- Sport: Ice hockey
- Teams: 4

Regular season
- Champions: Tivali Minsk
- Runners-up: HK Yunost Minsk

Belarusian Extraliga seasons
- ← 1998–99 2000–01 →

The 1999–2000 Belarusian Extraliga season was the eighth season of the Belarusian Extraliga, the top level of ice hockey in Belarus. Four teams participated in the league, and Tivali Minsk won the championship.

== Standings ==
	Club	G	GF:GA	Pts
1.	Tivali Minsk	18	63:58	23
2.	HK Yunost Minsk	18	68:51	22
3.	HK Neman Grodno	18	64:67	16
4.	Polimir Novopolotsk	18	58:77	11
