= 2000–01 Belarusian Extraliga season =

Ice hockey season

2000–01 Extraliga
- League: Extraliga
- Sport: Ice hockey
- Teams: 7

Regular season
- Champions: HK Neman Grodno
- Runners-up: HK Minsk

Belarusian Extraliga seasons
- ← 1999–2000 2001–02 →

The 2000–01 Belarusian Extraliga season was the ninth season of the Belarusian Extraliga, the top level of ice hockey in Belarus. Seven teams participated in the league, and HK Neman Grodno won the championship.

== Standings ==
	Club	G	W	T	L	GF:GA	Pts
1.	HK Neman Grodno	24	19	3	2	154:44	41
2.	HK Minsk	24	16	4	4	150:64	36
3.	Polimir Novopolotsk	24	16	3	5	171:66	35
4.	HK Gomel	24	15	2	7	153:52	32
5.	Khimik Vitebsk	24	6	0	18	74:181	12
6.	HK Yunost Minsk	24	4	0	20	78:231	8
7.	HK Khimvolokno Mogilev	24	2	0	22	48:180	4
