= 2001–02 Belarusian Extraliga season =

Ice hockey season

2001–02 Extraliga
- League: Extraliga
- Sport: Ice hockey
- Teams: 8

Regular season
- Best record: HK Gomel
- Runners-up: HK Keramin Minsk

Playoffs

Finals
- Champions: HK Keramin Minsk
- Runners-up: HK Khimvolokno Mogilev

Belarusian Extraliga seasons
- ← 2000–01 2002–03 →

The 2001–02 Belarusian Extraliga season was the tenth season of the Belarusian Extraliga, the top level of ice hockey in Belarus. Eight teams participated in the league, and HK Keramin Minsk won the championship.

== Regular season ==
=== Group A ===
	Club	GF:GA	Pts
1.	HK Gomel	84:56	37
2.	HK Keramin Minsk	78:52	34
3.	HK Neman Grodno	70:46	33
4.	HK Khimvolokno Mogilev	73:69	33

=== Group B ===
	Club	GF:GA	Pts
1.	HK Vitebsk	118:86	48
2.	Polimir Novopolotsk	129:83	44
3.	HK Brest	100:85	40
4.	HK Yunost Minsk	64:230	0

== Playoffs ==
Quarterfinals

- HK Keramin Minsk - HK Brest 2-0 on series
- HK Neman Grodno - Polimir Novopolotsk 2-0 on series
- HK Gomel - HK Yunost Minsk 2-0 on series
- HK Khimvolokno Mogilev - HK Vitebsk 2-0 on series

Semifinals

- HK Keramin Minsk - HK Neman Grodno 3-0 on series
- HK Khimvolonko Mogilev - HK Gomel 3-2 on series

Final

- HK Keramin Minsk - HK Khimvolokno Mogilev 3-0 on series
