= 1994–95 Belarusian Extraliga season =

Ice hockey season

1994–95 Extraliga
- League: Extraliga
- Sport: Ice hockey
- Teams: 7

Regular season
- Champions: Tivali Minsk
- Runners-up: Polimir Novopolotsk

Belarusian Extraliga seasons
- ← 1993–94 1995–96 →

The 1994–95 Belarusian Extraliga season was the third season of the Belarusian Extraliga, the top level of ice hockey in Belarus. Seven teams participated in the first round, and six teams participated in the final round, which was won by Tivali Minsk.

== First round ==
	Club	G	W	T	L	GF:GA	Pts
1.	Belstal Zhlobin	24	22	0	2	168:64	44
2.	HK Torpedo Minsk	24	15	2	7	138:89	32
3.	Triumph Minsk	24	12	2	10	120:86	26
4.	Polimir Novopolotsk	24	12	1	11	113:108	25
5.	HK Yunost Minsk	24	10	4	10	117:107	24
6.	Neman Grodno II	24	6	0	18	73:160	12
7.	HK Vitebsk	24	2	1	21	63:178	5

=== Playoffs ===
==== Semifinals ====
- Polimir Novopolotsk - Belstal Zhlobin 0:2 (0:5, 2:6)
- Triumph Minsk - HK Torpedo Minsk 1:2 (1:3, 7:2, 3:4)

==== 3rd place ====
- Triumph Minsk - Polimir Novopolotsk 2:0 (6:3, 4:2)

==== Final ====
- Belstal Zhlobin - HK Torpedo Minsk 2:1 (3:8, 6:3, 6:4)

== Final round ==
	Club	G	W	T	L	GF:GA	Pts
1.	Tivali Minsk	10	10	0	0	88:13	20
2.	Polimir Novopolotsk	10	8	0	2	59:25	16
3.	HK Neman Grodno	10	5	0	5	53:30	10
4.	Belstal Zhlobin	10	4	1	5	31:50	9
5.	HK Torpedo Minsk	10	2	1	7	28:83	5
6.	HK Yunost Minsk	10	0	0	10	19:77	0
