= Vysshaya Liga (Belarus) =

Ice hockey league in Belarus

- Sport: Ice hockey
- Founded: 2002
- Founder: Belarus Ice Hockey Federation
- First season: 2002–03
- CEO: Eugene Vorsin
- No. of teams: 12
- Country: Belarus (12 teams)
- Most recent champion: HC Neman Grodno 2
- Most titles: Yunost Minsk II (6)
- Related competitions: Belarusian Extraleague
- Website: hockey.by

The Vysshaya Liga (Belarusian: Вышэйшая ліга; Russian: Высшая лига; Higher League) is the second level ice hockey league in Belarus. It primarily serves as a development league for the Belarusian Extraleague, with most of its clubs serving as affiliates for the higher league.

== Champions ==
Season	Champion	Runner-up	3rd place
2002–2003	HK Gomel II	HK Keramin Minsk II	HC Neman Grodno 2
2003–2004	HK Gomel II	HC Neman Grodno 2	Khimvolokno Mogilev II
2004–2005	Khimvolokno Mogilev II	HC Neman Grodno 2	HK Gomel II
2005–2006	HK Gomel II	Yunost Minsk II	HC Dinamo Minsk II
2006–2007	HK Gomel II	HC Dinamo Minsk II	Yunost Minsk II
2007–2008	Yunost Minsk II	HK Gomel II	HK Keramin Minsk II
2008–2009	HK Keramin Minsk II	HC Neman Grodno 2	Yunost Minsk II
2009–2010	Yunost Minsk II	HK Gomel II	HC Neman Grodno 2
2010–2011	Dinamo-Shinnik Bobruisk	Yunost Minsk II	Metallurg Zhlobin II
2011–2012	Yunost Minsk II	HK Mogilev II	HK Gomel II
2012–2013	Metallurg Zhlobin II	Shakhtar Soligorsk II	HK Mogilev II
2013–2014	Yunost Minsk II	HK Gomel II	HK Mogilev II
2014–2015	Yunost–MHL Minsk	Metallurg Zhlobin II	HC Neman Grodno 2
2015–2016	Shakhtar Soligorsk II	Dinamo-Raubichi Minsk	HK Gomel II
2016–2017	Yunost Minsk II	Shakhtar Soligorsk II	HK Gomel II
2017–2018	HK Gomel II	Yunior Minsk	Shakhtar Soligorsk II
2018–2019	HC Neman Grodno 2	Yunior Minsk	Belarus U17
2019–2020	Belarus U17	Minsk Zubry	Yunior Minsk
2020–2021	Minsk Zubry	Yunior Minsk	Shakhtar Soligorsk II
