= 2002–03 Belarusian Extraliga season =

Ice hockey season

2002–03 Extraliga
- League: Extraliga
- Sport: Ice hockey
- Teams: 8

Regular season
- Best record: HK Gomel
- Runners-up: HK Keramin Minsk

Playoffs

Finals
- Champions: HK Gomel
- Runners-up: HK Keramin Minsk

Belarusian Extraliga seasons
- ← 2001–02 2003–04 →

The 2002–03 Belarusian Extraliga season was the 11th season of the Belarusian Extraliga, the top level of ice hockey in Belarus. Eight teams participated in the league, and HK Gomel won the championship.

== Regular season ==
	Club	G	W	OTW	OTL	L	GF:GA	Pts
1.	HK Gomel	42	33	3	0	6	205:82	105
2.	HK Keramin Minsk	42	26	2	4	10	177:115	86
3.	HK Khimvolokno Mogilev	42	23	5	3	11	168:119	82
4.	HK Neman Grodno	42	15	6	7	14	116:118	64
5.	HK Brest	42	14	3	5	20	142:158	53
6.	HK Vitebsk	42	14	2	3	23	116:136	49
7.	Polimir Novopolotsk	42	11	1	2	28	95:185	37
8.	HK Yunost Minsk	42	7	3	1	31	127:233	28

== Playoffs ==
Semifinals

- HK Gomel - HK Neman Grodno 3-0 on series
- HK Keramin Minsk - HK Khimvolokno Mogilev 3-1 on series

Final

- HK Gomel - HK Keramin Minsk 3-0 on series

3rd place

- HK Khimvolokno Mogilev - HK Neman Grodno 2-1 on series
