= 2005–06 Belarusian Extraliga season =

Ice hockey season

2005–06 Extraliga
- League: Extraliga
- Sport: Ice hockey
- Teams: 12

Regular season
- Best record: HK Yunost Minsk
- Runners-up: HC Dinamo Minsk

Playoffs

Finals
- Champions: HK Yunost Minsk
- Runners-up: HC Dinamo Minsk

Belarusian Extraliga seasons
- ← 2004–05 2006–07 →

The 2005–06 Belarusian Extraliga season was the 14th season of the Belarusian Extraliga, the top level of ice hockey in Belarus. Twelve teams participated in the league, and HK Yunost Minsk won the championship.

== Regular season ==
	Club	G	W	OTW	T	OTL	L	GF:GA	Pts
1.	(Belarus) HK Yunost Minsk	55	32	4	7	2	10	171:110	113
2.	(Belarus) HC Dinamo Minsk	55	32	1	8	0	14	156:101	106
3.	(Belarus) HK Keramin Minsk	55	30	1	11	3	10	155:103	106
4.	(Ukraine) HK Sokil Kyiv	55	31	1	6	2	15	145:108	103
5.	(Belarus) HK Khimvolokno Mogilev	55	30	1	7	1	16	160:130	100
6.	(Latvia) HK Riga 2000	55	23	2	8	1	21	150:134	82
7.	(Belarus) HK Gomel	55	23	1	10	0	21	128:132	81
8.	(Belarus) HK Neman Grodno	55	20	2	5	1	27	109:132	70
9.	(Belarus) HK Brest	55	18	3	8	1	25	131:146	69
10.	(Latvia) HK Liepājas Metalurgs	55	15	0	5	2	32	116:161	52
11.	(Belarus) Khimik-SKA Novopolotsk	55	12	0	5	3	35	91:151	44
12.	(Belarus) HK Vitebsk	55	6	1	2	1	45	80:184	23

== Playoffs ==
Quarterfinals

- HK Yunost Minsk - HK Neman Grodno 3-0 on series
- HK Khimvolokno Mogilev - HK Sokil Kyiv 3-0 on series
- HC Dinamo Minsk - HK Gomel 3-0 on series
- HK Riga 2000 - HK Keramin Minsk 3-1 on series

Semifinals

- HK Yunost Minsk - HK Khimvolokno Mogilev 3-1 on series
- HC Dinamo Minsk - HK Riga 2000 3-0 on series

Final

- HK Yunost Minsk - HC Dinamo Minsk 4-0 on series

3rd place

- HK Riga 2000 - HK Khimvolokno Mogilev 2-0 on series
