= 2003–04 Belarusian Extraliga season =

Ice hockey season

2003–04 Extraliga
- League: Extraliga
- Sport: Ice hockey
- Teams: 10

Regular season
- Best record: HK Keramin Minsk
- Runners-up: HK Gomel

Playoffs

Finals
- Champions: HK Yunost Minsk
- Runners-up: HK Keramin Minsk

Belarusian Extraliga seasons
- ← 2002–03 2004–05 →

The 2003–04 Belarusian Extraliga season was the 12th season of the Belarusian Extraliga, the top level of ice hockey in Belarus. Ten teams participated in the league, and HK Yunost Minsk won the championship.

== Regular season ==
	Club	G	W	OTW	T	OTL	L	GF:GA	Pts
1.	HK Keramin Minsk	45	35	0	3	0	7	188:70	108
2.	HK Gomel	45	32	1	4	2	6	186:84	102
3.	HK Yunost Minsk	45	28	3	1	1	12	162:100	91
4.	HC Dinamo Minsk	45	23	3	6	1	12	151:114	81
5.	HK Neman Grodno	45	21	4	1	0	19	132:117	72
6.	HK Khimvolokno Mogilev	45	22	2	2	1	18	131:129	72
7.	Khimik Novopolotsk	45	18	0	1	4	22	90:119	55
8.	HK Vitebsk	45	9	2	1	4	29	115:157	32
9.	HK Brest	45	8	1	1	2	33	80:163	27
10.	HK Junior Minsk	45	1	1	2	2	39	76:258	7

== Playoffs ==
Quarterfinals

- HK Keramin Minsk - HK Vitebsk 2-0 on series
- HC Dinamo Minsk - HK Neman Grodno 2-0 on series
- HK Gomel - Khimik Novopolotsk 2-0 on series
- HK Yunost Minsk - HK Khimvolokno Mogilev 2-0 on series

Semifinals

- HK Keramin Minsk - HC Dinamo Minsk 3-0 on series
- HK Yunost Minsk - HK Gomel 3-2 on series

Final

- HK Yunost Minsk - HK Keramin Minsk 3-0 on series

3rd place

- HK Gomel - HC Dinamo Minsk 3-1 on series
