= 2004–05 Belarusian Extraliga season =

Ice hockey season

2004–05 Extraliga
- League: Extraliga
- Sport: Ice hockey
- Teams: 12

Regular season
- Best record: HK Yunost Minsk
- Runners-up: HK Keramin Minsk

Playoffs

Finals
- Champions: HK Yunost Minsk
- Runners-up: HK Keramin Minsk

Belarusian Extraliga seasons
- ← 2003–04 2005–06 →

The 2004–05 Belarusian Extraliga season was the 13th season of the Belarusian Extraliga, in Belarus. 12 teams participated in the league, and HK Yunost Minsk won the championship.

== Regular season ==
| | Club | G | W | OTW | T | OTL | L | GF:GA | Pts |
|---|---|---|---|---|---|---|---|---|---|
| 1. | (Belarus) HK Yunost Minsk | 44 | 27 | 2 | 7 | 1 | 7 | 140:69 | 93 |
| 2. | (Belarus) HK Keramin Minsk | 44 | 26 | 1 | 8 | 0 | 9 | 144:97 | 88 |
| 3. | (Ukraine) HK Sokil Kyiv | 44 | 24 | 2 | 5 | 1 | 12 | 132:95 | 82 |
| 4. | (Belarus) HK Khimvolokno Mogilev | 44 | 22 | 0 | 5 | 4 | 13 | 124:104 | 75 |
| 5. | (Latvia) HK Riga 2000 | 44 | 22 | 2 | 2 | 2 | 16 | 132:105 | 74 |
| 6. | (Belarus) HK Gomel | 44 | 18 | 2 | 8 | 1 | 15 | 121:99 | 67 |
| 7. | (Latvia) HK Liepājas Metalurgs | 44 | 18 | 0 | 10 | 1 | 15 | 110:108 | 65 |
| 8. | (Belarus) Khimik-SKA Novopolotsk | 44 | 18 | 1 | 6 | 3 | 16 | 87:91 | 65 |
| 9. | (Belarus) HC Dinamo Minsk | 44 | 11 | 1 | 8 | 0 | 24 | 86:129 | 43 |
| 10. | (Belarus) HK Neman Grodno | 44 | 9 | 3 | 9 | 1 | 22 | 90:111 | 43 |
| 11. | (Belarus) HK Brest | 44 | 8 | 4 | 7 | 3 | 22 | 76:126 | 42 |
| 12. | (Belarus) HK Vitebsk | 44 | 2 | 0 | 7 | 1 | 34 | 72:180 | 14 |

== Playoffs ==
Quarterfinals

- HK Yunost Minsk - Khimik-SKA Novopolotsk 3-0 on series
- HK Khimvolokno Mogilev - HK Riga 2000 3-0 on series
- HK Keramin Minsk - HK Liepājas Metalurgs 3-1 on series
- HK Sokil Kyiv - HK Gomel 3-2 on series

Semifinals

- HK Yunost Minsk - HK Khimvolokno Mogilev 4-0 on series
- HK Keramin Minsk - HK Sokil Kyiv 4-2 on series

Final

- HK Yunost Minsk - HK Keramin Minsk 4-1 on series

3rd place

- HK Khimvolokno Mogilev - HK Sokil Kyiv 2-0 on series
