= Tivali Minsk =

- City: Minsk, Belarus
- League: EEHL 1996-2000 Belarusian Open League; 1993-2000; Soviet League; 1985-1996; Vysshaya Liga; 1984-1989; Soviet League; 1980-1981; Vysshaya Liga; 1977-1980; Soviet League; 1976-1977 Vysshaya Liga; 1946-1976
- Founded: 1946
- Operated: 2001
- Colors
- Website: www.hcdinamo.org

Franchise history
- Torpedo Minsk: 1946-1956
- Burevestnik Minsk: 1956-1958
- Krasnoye Znamya: 1964-1965
- Trud Minsk: 1964-1965
- Vimpel Minsk: 1965-1966
- Torpedo Minsk: 1966-1977
- Dynamo Minsk: 1977-1993

Tivali Minsk also known as Hockey club Dinamo Minsk or HC Dinamo Minsk was an ice hockey club based in Minsk, Belarus.

== History ==
Formed in 1946, this Minsk based hockey team went through several identity changes all the while playing amongst several hockey leagues in Europe. It went bankrupt in 2001. In 2003, the team was brought back under its traditional namesake, Dinamo Minsk.

== Honors ==
=== Winners ===
- Belarusian Extraliga Championship: 4

1993, 1994, 1995, 2000

- Vysshaya Liga Championship: 4

1970, 1977, 1996, 1997

=== Runners Up ===
- Belarusian Extraliga Championship: 2

1996, 1997
