= Keramin Minsk =

- City: Minsk, Belarus
- League: Belarusian Extraleague; 2001-2010; Belarusian Cup; 1998-2009; Eastern European Hockey League; 2001-2004
- Founded: 1998
- Folded: 2010
- Home arena: Minsk Ice Palace (capacity: 1823)
- Affiliate: Dinamo Minsk (KHL)
- Website: Official site

Franchise history
- Keramin Minsk: HK Minsk (1998-2002)

Keramin Minsk (Belar. Керамин-Минск) was an ice hockey team from Minsk, Belarus. They played in the Belarusian Extraleague until 2010 where the team disbanded due to financial reasons.

== History ==
The club was created in 1998 under the name HC Minsk. In 2001, the club changed name to Keramin Minsk. In 2008 they signed an affiliation to be a feeder club for Dinamo Minsk, who play in the Kontinental Hockey League.

On 10 July 2010 it was announced that the team was asking the players to start looking for a new club. Six days later the owners announced the dissolution of the club due to financial reasons.

== Honours ==
- Belarusian Extraleague:
  - 2002, 2008.
- Eastern European Hockey League:
  - 2003, 2004.
- Belarusian Cup:
  - 2002, 2008.
