= Aleksandr Syrei =

Belarusian ice hockey player

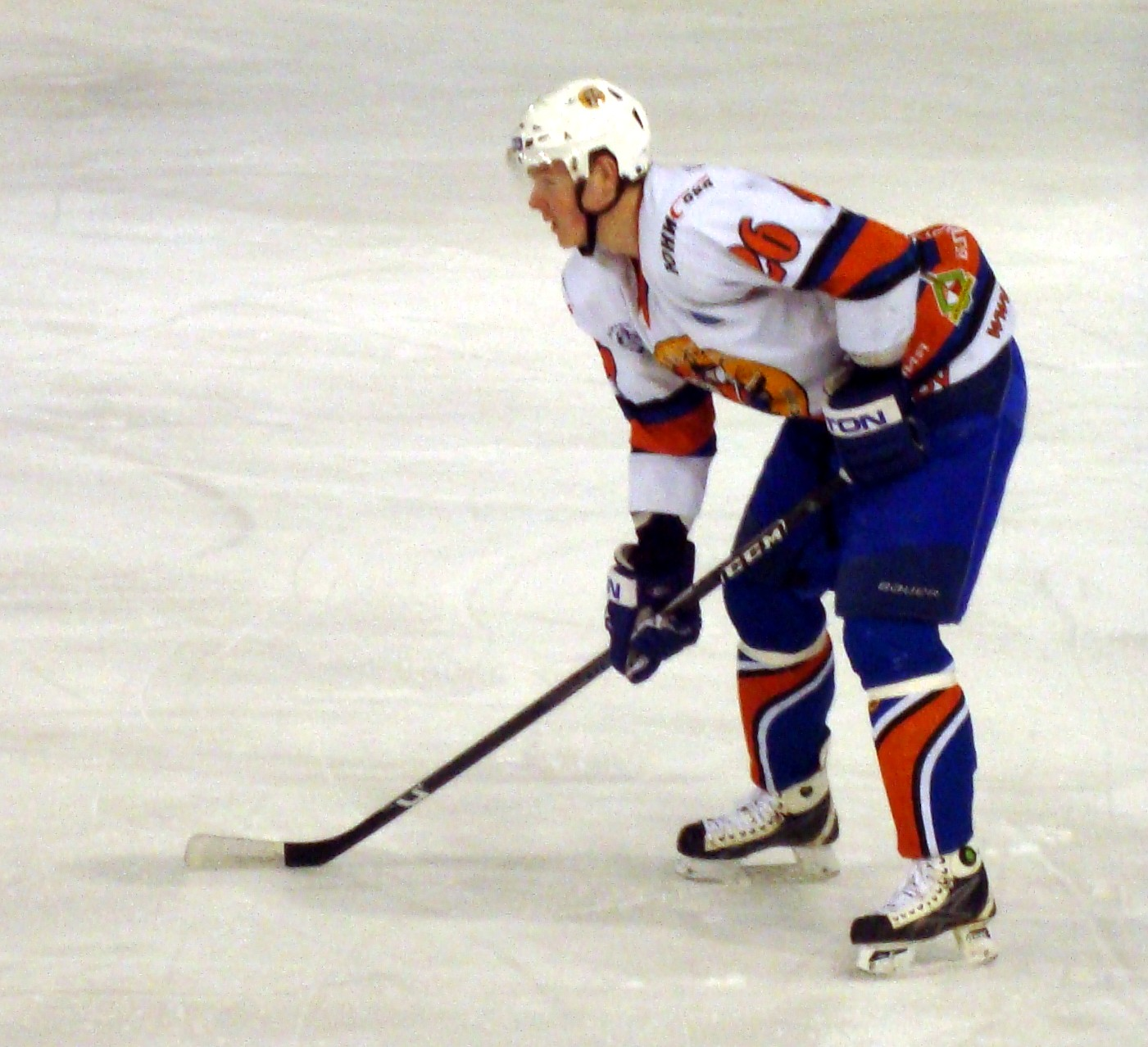
- Aleksandr Syrei
- Born: August 26, 1988 (age 38) Grodno, Byelorussian SSR, Soviet Union
- Height: 6 ft 2 in (188 cm)
- Weight: 220 lb (100 kg; 15 st 10 lb)
- Position: Defence
- Shot: Right
- Belarus team Former teams: Shakhtar Soligorsk; HK Brest; HK Gomel
- National team: Belarus
- Playing career: 2003–2020

Aleksandr Syrei (Russian: Александр Сырей) (born 26 August 1988 in Grodno, Byelorussian SSR, Soviet Union) is a Belarusian professional ice hockey defenceman. He currently plays for Shakhtar Soligorsk of the Belarusian Extraliga. Syrei began his professional career with HK Gomel of the Eastern European Hockey League's Division B and played with that organization for five seasons.

Syrei previously represented Belarus at the 2004, 2005, and 2006 IIHF World U18 Championships, and the 2007 World Junior Ice Hockey Championships.

== Career statistics ==
=== Regular season and playoffs ===
| | | | Regular season | | | | | Playoffs |
| Season | Team | League | GP | G | A | Pts | PIM | GP | G | A | Pts | PIM |
|---|---|---|---|---|---|---|---|---|---|---|---|---|
| 2003–04 | HK–2 Gomel | EEHL B | 14 | 1 | 2 | 3 | 10 | — | — | — | — | — |
| 2003–04 | HK–2 Gomel | BLR.2 | 31 | 0 | 3 | 3 | 28 | — | — | — | — | — |
| 2004–05 | HK–2 Gomel | BLR.2 | 44 | 1 | 4 | 5 | 28 | — | — | — | — | — |
| 2005–06 | HK Gomel | BLR | 1 | 0 | 0 | 0 | 0 | — | — | — | — | — |
| 2005–06 | HK–2 Gomel | BLR.2 | 40 | 3 | 11 | 14 | 68 | — | — | — | — | — |
| 2006–07 | HK Brest | BLR | 28 | 4 | 3 | 7 | 44 | — | — | — | — | — |
| 2006–07 | HK Gomel | BLR | 13 | 2 | 1 | 3 | 4 | — | — | — | — | — |
| 2006–07 | HK–2 Gomel | BLR.2 | 3 | 0 | 0 | 0 | 4 | — | — | — | — | — |
| 2007–08 | HK Gomel | BLR | 36 | 0 | 2 | 2 | 12 | — | — | — | — | — |
| 2007–08 | HK–2 Gomel | BLR.2 | 31 | 1 | 5 | 6 | 67 | — | — | — | — | — |
| 2008–09 | Neman Grodno | BLR | 38 | 1 | 9 | 10 | 36 | 3 | 0 | 0 | 0 | 2 |
| 2008–09 | Neman–2 Grodno | BLR.2 | 8 | 1 | 1 | 2 | 6 | — | — | — | — | — |
| 2009–10 | Shakhtyor Soligorsk | BLR | 38 | 0 | 7 | 7 | 30 | — | — | — | — | — |
| 2010–11 | HK Mogilev | BLR | 29 | 5 | 7 | 12 | 32 | — | — | — | — | — |
| 2010–11 | HK–2 Mogilev | BLR.2 | 1 | 0 | 1 | 1 | 0 | — | — | — | — | — |
| 2011–12 | HK Mogilev | BLR | 12 | 1 | 3 | 4 | 14 | — | — | — | — | — |
| 2011–12 | Yunost Minsk | BLR | 38 | 2 | 10 | 12 | 36 | 5 | 0 | 1 | 1 | 6 |
| 2012–13 | Yermak Angarsk | VHL | 39 | 0 | 8 | 8 | 32 | — | — | — | — | — |
| 2013–14 | Titan Klin | VHL | 12 | 0 | 0 | 0 | 20 | — | — | — | — | — |
| 2013–14 | Yunost Minsk | BLR | 27 | 2 | 1 | 3 | 16 | 15 | 1 | 3 | 4 | 18 |
| 2014–15 | Yunost Minsk | BLR | 53 | 14 | 22 | 36 | 87 | — | — | — | — | — |
| 2015–16 | Yunost Minsk | BLR | 35 | 2 | 10 | 12 | 24 | 12 | 0 | 0 | 0 | 6 |
| 2016–17 | Podhale Nowy Targ | POL | 31 | 2 | 9 | 11 | 76 | — | — | — | — | — |
| 2016–17 | HC Donbass | UKR | 6 | 3 | 1 | 4 | 16 | 11 | 2 | 1 | 3 | 10 |
| 2017–18 | HK Gomel | BLR | 36 | 4 | 8 | 12 | 21 | 5 | 0 | 0 | 0 | 6 |
| 2018–19 | HK Gomel | BLR | 22 | 3 | 5 | 8 | 22 | — | — | — | — | — |
| 2018–19 | Arlan Kokshetau | KAZ | 17 | 2 | 3 | 5 | 16 | — | — | — | — | — |
| 2018–19 | Beibarys Atyrau | KAZ | — | — | — | — | — | 9 | 0 | 1 | 1 | 6 |
| 2019–20 | Dynamo Molodechno | BLR | 12 | 1 | 4 | 5 | 12 | — | — | — | — | — |
| 2019–20 | Khimik Novopolotsk | BLR.2 | — | — | — | — | — | 17 | 3 | 7 | 10 | 45 |
| BLR totals | | | 418 | 41 | 92 | 133 | 390 | 44 | 1 | 4 | 5 | 40 |

=== International ===
| Year | Team | Event | GP | G | A | Pts | PIM |
|---|---|---|---|---|---|---|---|
| 2004 | Belarus | WJC18 | 6 | 0 | 0 | 0 | 0 |
| 2005 | Belarus | WJC18 D1 | 4 | 0 | 1 | 1 | 0 |
| 2006 | Belarus | WJC18 | 6 | 1 | 0 | 1 | 16 |
| 2007 | Belarus | WJC | 6 | 0 | 2 | 2 | 4 |
| Junior totals | | | 22 | 1 | 3 | 4 | 20 |
