= Andrei Karev =

Belarusian ice hockey player

- Born: February 12, 1985 (age 41) Elektrostal, Russian SFSR, Soviet Union
- Height: 5 ft 10 in (178 cm)
- Weight: 198 lb (90 kg; 14 st 2 lb)
- Position: Defence
- Shot: Left
- BXL team Former teams: Yunost Minsk; Dinamo Minsk (KHL); Elemash Elektrosal (RUS-2)
- National team: Belarus
- Playing career: 2002–2019

Andrei Germanovich Karev (born February 12, 1985) is a Belarusian professional ice hockey defenceman. He currently plays for Yunost Minsk of the VHL.

== Playing career ==
Karev began his career at Elemash Elktrostal, his hometown team, playing 42 games in the Russian second division. He then moved to the Yunost Minsk system, where has played almost all of his career since. He has won three Belarusian Extraleague titles with Yunost, coming in consecutive years starting in 2008–09.

Karev played six games for Kontinental Hockey League team Dinamo Minsk in 2009–10, returning to Yunost Minsk after that.

== International career ==
Karev was selected for the Belarus national men's ice hockey team in the 2010 Winter Olympics, playing in four games. He had previously played for the Belarus U-20 national team, competing in the 2005 World Junior Ice Hockey Championships

== Career statistics ==
=== Regular season and playoffs ===
			Regular season					Playoffs
Season	Team	League	GP	G	A	Pts	PIM	GP	G	A	Pts	PIM
2002–03	Elemash Elektrostal	RUS.2	42	1	2	3	69	—	—	—	—	—
2002–03	Elemash–2 Elektrostal	RUS.3	7	0	0	0	20	—	—	—	—	—
2003–04	Yunior Minsk	BLR	14	0	1	1	40	—	—	—	—	—
2003–04	Yunost Minsk	BLR	21	1	1	2	26	8	0	0	0	6
2003–04	Yunost–2 Minsk	BLR.2	2	1	2	3	18	—	—	—	—	—
2004–05	Yunost Minsk	BLR	34	1	4	5	28	4	0	0	0	0
2004–05	Yunior Minsk	BLR.2	9	1	7	8	24	—	—	—	—	—
2005–06	Yunost Minsk	BLR	31	0	0	0	26	—	—	—	—	—
2005–06	Yunior Minsk	BLR.2	3	1	0	1	37	—	—	—	—	—
2006–07	Yunost Minsk	BLR	32	1	3	4	90	9	0	0	0	8
2006–07	Yunior Minsk	BLR.2	15	5	6	11	32	—	—	—	—	—
2007–08	Yunost Minsk	BLR	44	3	5	8	48	11	1	0	1	10
2008–09	Yunost Minsk	BLR	49	3	5	8	48	9	0	2	2	8
2009–10	Dinamo Minsk	KHL	6	0	0	0	10	—	—	—	—	—
2009–10	Yunost Minsk	BLR	28	0	2	2	30	11	0	0	0	18
2010–11	Yunost Minsk	BLR	34	3	12	15	42	1	0	0	0	0
2011–12	Yunost Minsk	BLR	40	1	3	4	64	5	0	0	0	4
2012–13	Yunost Minsk	VHL	42	1	2	3	56	—	—	—	—	—
2012–13	Yunior Minsk	BLR	5	0	2	2	0	2	0	1	1	0
2013–14	Dinamo Minsk	KHL	4	0	0	0	2	—	—	—	—	—
2013–14	Yunost Minsk	BLR	36	1	4	5	64	15	0	0	0	8
2014–15	Shakhter Soligorsk	BLR	53	3	9	12	111	11	0	0	0	22
2015–16	Shakhter Soligorsk	BLR	36	1	5	6	59	11	0	0	0	8
2016–17	Shakhter Soligorsk	BLR	21	2	2	4	32	10	0	3	3	14
2017–18	HK Gomel	BLR	35	0	4	4	26	5	0	1	1	4
2018–19	HK Lida	BLR	46	0	3	3	28	4	0	0	0	0
BLR totals			559	20	65	85	762	116	1	7	8	110
KHL totals			10	0	0	0	12	—	—	—	—	—

=== International ===
Year	Team	Event	GP	G	A	Pts	PIM
2005	Belarus	WJC	6	0	1	1	34
2010	Belarus	OG	4	0	0	0	2
2014	Belarus	WC	5	0	0	0	0
Senior totals			9	0	0	0	2
