= Alexander Ryadinsky =

Belarusian ice hockey player

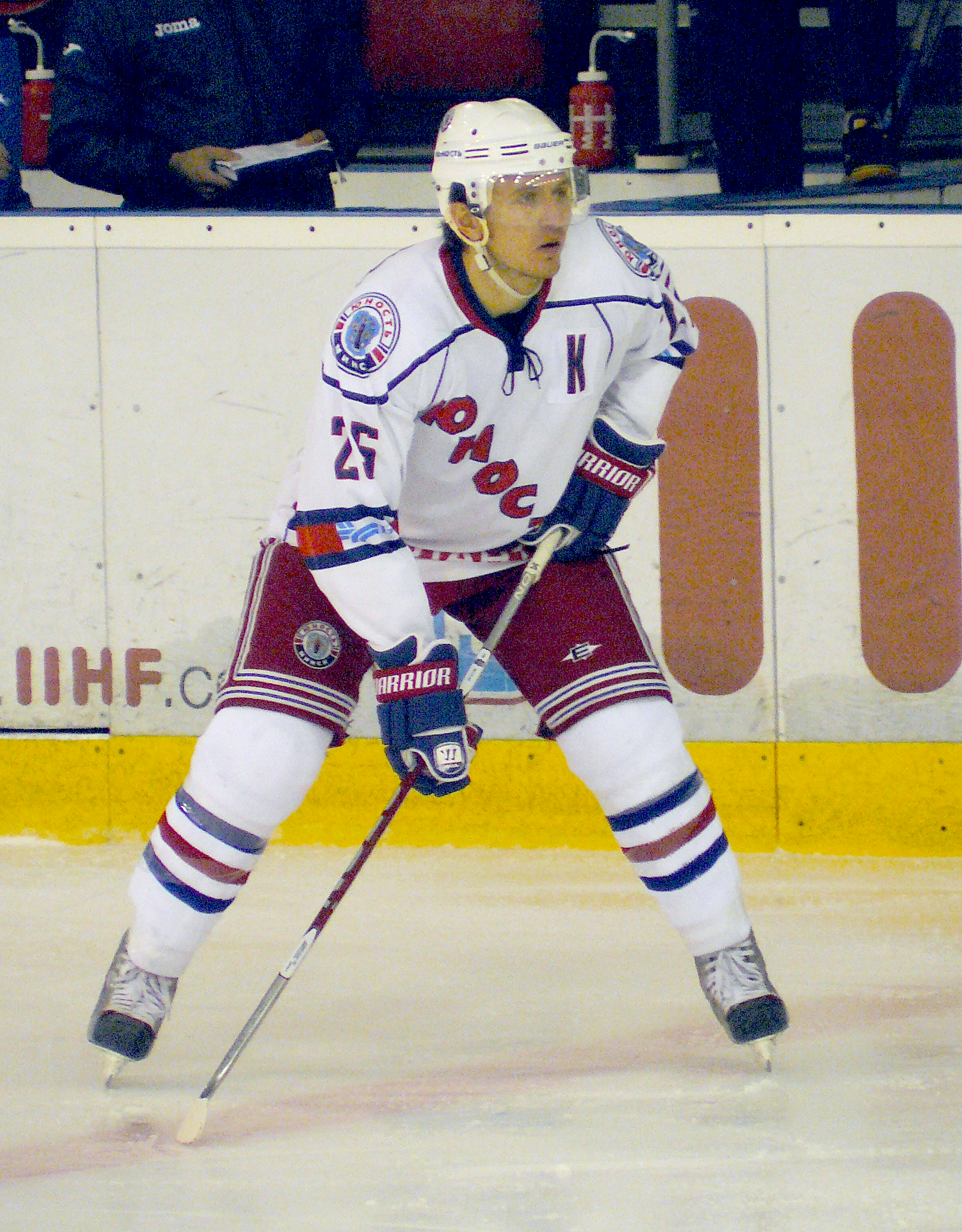
- Born: April 1, 1978 (age 48) Minsk, Soviet Union
- Height: 6 ft 3 in (191 cm)
- Weight: 209 lb (95 kg; 14 st 13 lb)
- Position: Defence
- Shot: Right
- National team: Belarus
- Playing career: 1996–2017

Alexander Nikolaevich Ryadinsky (born April 1, 1978) is a Belarusian professional ice hockey player who participated at the 2010 IIHF World Championship as a member of the Belarus National men's ice hockey team.

== Career statistics ==
=== Regular season and playoffs ===
			Regular season					Playoffs
Season	Team	League	GP	G	A	Pts	PIM	GP	G	A	Pts	PIM
1995–96	Yunost Minsk	EEHL	32	1	1	2	42	—	—	—	—	—
1996–97	Yunost Minsk	BLR	8	0	1	1	18	—	—	—	—	—
1996–97	Yunost Minsk	EEHL	30	3	4	7	48	—	—	—	—	—
1997–98	Avangard–2 Omsk	RUS.3	4	0	0	0	6	—	—	—	—	—
1997–98	Yunost Minsk	BLR	16	0	2	2	20	—	—	—	—	—
1997–98	Yunost Minsk	EEHL	42	8	9	17	81	—	—	—	—	—
1998–99	Yunost Minsk	BLR	6	1	0	1	14	—	—	—	—	—
1998–99	Yunost Minsk	EEHL	6	1	0	1	14	—	—	—	—	—
1998–99	Anchorage Aces	WCHL	4	0	0	0	4	—	—	—	—	—
1998–99	Lincoln Stars	USHL	33	6	9	15	39	10	0	2	2	2
1999–2000	Yunost Minsk	EEHL	4	0	2	2	8	—	—	—	—	—
1999–2000	Arkansas RiverBlades	ECHL	49	2	4	6	34	—	—	—	—	—
1999–2000	Toledo Storm	ECHL	27	1	3	4	14	—	—	—	—	—
1999–2000	HK Minsk	BLR	3	0	1	1	6	—	—	—	—	—
2000–01	HK Minsk	BLR	22	1	5	6	41	—	—	—	—	—
2000–01	HK Minsk	EEHL	29	2	6	8	32	—	—	—	—	—
2001–02	Keramin Minsk	BLR	19	1	3	4	49	6	0	0	0	35
2001–02	Keramin Minsk	EEHL	35	2	1	3	34	—	—	—	—	—
2002–03	Keramin Minsk	BLR	42	4	11	15	34	7	1	0	1	6
2002–03	Keramin Minsk	EEHL	34	5	4	9	34	—	—	—	—	—
2003–04	Keramin Minsk	BLR	45	5	7	12	64	8	1	2	3	10
2003–04	Keramin Minsk	EEHL	30	5	7	12	40	—	—	—	—	—
2004–05	Keramin Minsk	BLR	43	5	7	12	38	15	1	5	6	8
2005–06	Keramin Minsk	BLR	54	5	20	25	90	4	0	1	1	4
2006–07	Keramin Minsk	BLR	50	14	14	28	70	10	0	4	4	12
2007–08	Keramin Minsk	BLR	46	6	20	26	108	10	1	0	1	33
2008–09	Yunost Minsk	BLR	48	5	15	20	26	15	1	4	5	12
2009–10	Dinamo Minsk	KHL	10	0	1	1	12	—	—	—	—	—
2009–10	Shakhtyor Soligorsk	BLR	11	1	8	9	18	—	—	—	—	—
2009–10	Yunost Minsk	BLR	10	1	2	3	0	13	1	8	9	6
2010–11	Yunost Minsk	BLR	55	11	39	50	41	13	2	8	10	8
2011–12	Neman Grodno	BLR	44	4	20	24	30	15	2	2	4	18
2012–13	Sokol Kyiv	UKR	31	2	6	8	26	9	2	1	3	6
2013–14	Metallurg Zhlobin	BLR	46	3	13	16	24	7	2	2	4	10
2014–15	Metallurg Zhlobin	BLR	37	6	13	19	28	—	—	—	—	—
2014–15	Yunost Minsk	BLR	14	0	3	3	28	12	0	6	6	16
2015–16	Yunost Minsk	BLR	42	7	11	18	24	13	1	3	4	6
2016–17	Yunost Minsk	BLR	11	2	1	3	8	—	—	—	—	—
2016–17	Shakhtyor Soligorsk	BLR	7	0	0	0	2	—	—	—	—	—
2016–17	Podhale Nowy Targ	POL	3	0	0	0	0	11	1	2	3	8
EEHL totals			242	27	34	61	333	—	—	—	—	—
BLR totals			679	82	216	298	781	148	13	45	58	184

=== International ===
Year	Team	Event	GP	G	A	Pts	PIM
1996	Belarus	EJC	5	0	1	1	8
1997	Belarus	WJC C	4	0	1	1	2
1998	Belarus	WJC B	6	1	1	2	6
2003	Belarus	WC	6	0	2	2	4
2005	Belarus	OGQ	3	0	0	0	4
2005	Belarus	WC	6	0	0	0	0
2006	Belarus	WC	4	0	0	0	2
2007	Belarus	WC	5	1	1	2	6
2009	Belarus	WC	7	0	0	0	8
2010	Belarus	OG	4	0	1	1	2
2010	Belarus	WC	6	0	0	0	2
2011	Belarus	WC	5	0	0	0	4
Junior totals			15	1	3	4	16
Senior totals			46	1	4	5	32
