= Konstantin Zakharov (ice hockey) =

Belarusian ice hockey player

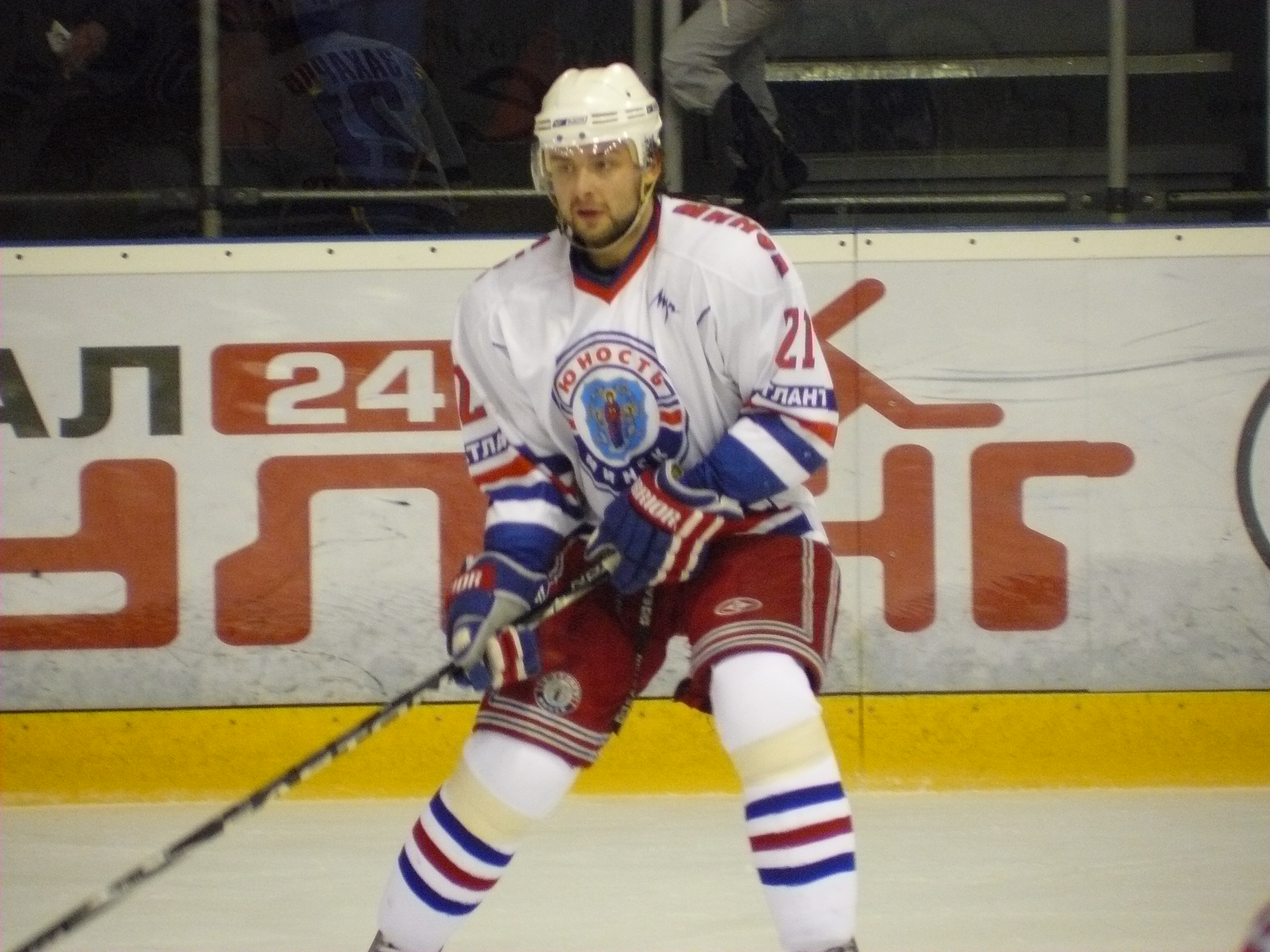
- Born: May 2, 1985 (age 41) Minsk, Byelorussian SSR, Soviet Union
- Height: 6 ft 1 in (185 cm)
- Weight: 207 lb (94 kg; 14 st 11 lb)
- Position: Right wing
- Shot: Right
- KHL team Former teams: HC Dinamo Minsk; HK Gomel (Belarus); Moncton Wildcats (QMJHL); Worcester IceCats (AHL); Peoria Rivermen (AHL); Alaska Aces (ECHL); Yunost Minsk (BXL)
- National team: Belarus
- NHL draft: 101st overall, 2003; St. Louis Blues
- Playing career: 2001–2018

Konstantin Mikhailovich Zakharov (Russian: Константин Михайлович Захаров; born 2 May 1985 in Minsk, Byelorussian SSR, Soviet Union) is a Belarusian former ice hockey right winger. He played for HC Dinamo Minsk of the KHL. Internationally he played for the Belarusian national team at multiple tournaments

== Playing career ==
Zakharov made his senior debut playing for Yunost Minsk, then moved to HK Gomel, playing at better than a point per game pace in the Belarusian Extraliga. After being drafted by the St. Louis Blues in the 2003 NHL entry draft, he moved to the QMJHL, with the Moncton Wildcats. He scored 33 goals in Moncton, helping his team to make the President's Cup final. After that season, he moved to St. Louis' AHL affiliate, the Worcester IceCats. However, he had just 14 points in 59 games, and the next season split time between the Alaska Aces of the ECHL and Yunost Minsk in the Belarusian Extraliga. He returned to North America for the start of 2006–07, playing with the Peoria Rivermen, but returned home at the end of the season, again playing with Yunost, where he has played since, helping the team to three consecutive league titles between 2009 and 2011.

Zakharov played four games for Kontinental Hockey League team HC Dinamo Minsk in 2009–10, returning to Yunost Minsk after that.

== International career ==
Zakharov was selected for the Belarus national men's ice hockey team in the 2010 Winter Olympics, playing in four games and scoring a goal, in the shootout loss to Switzerland that eliminated Belarus from the tournament.

As of 2013, that was Zakharov's only time representing Belarus at the senior level, but he played multiple times for both the under-20 and under-18 teams. He competed in four World Junior Ice Hockey Championships, the first coming in 2001 World Junior Ice Hockey Championships, when he was just 15. In 2003, he was the leading scorer at the Under-18 championships, recording more points than future stars Alexander Ovechkin and Evgeni Malkin.

== Career statistics ==
=== Regular season and playoffs ===
			Regular season					Playoffs
Season	Team	League	GP	G	A	Pts	PIM	GP	G	A	Pts	PIM
2000–01	Yunost Minsk	BLR	19	11	7	18	40	—	—	—	—	—
2001–02	Krylia Sovetov–2 Moscow	RUS–3	7	5	1	6	2	—	—	—	—	—
2001–02	Yunost Minsk	BLR	14	4	5	9	39	2	3	0	3	0
2002–03	Yunost Minsk	BLR	17	18	19	37	34	—	—	—	—	—
2002–03	HK Gomel	BLR	17	7	8	15	16	2	1	1	2	0
2002–03	HK Gomel	EEHL	14	2	4	6	10	—	—	—	—	—
2003–04	Moncton Wildcats	QMJHL	55	33	16	49	63	20	7	9	16	18
2004–05	Worcester IceCats	AHL	59	4	10	14	26	—	—	—	—	—
2005–06	Alaska Aces	ECHL	8	0	2	2	4	—	—	—	—	—
2005–06	Yunost Minsk	BLR	31	12	13	25	68	5	2	2	4	10
2005–06	Yunior Minsk	BLR–2	1	1	1	2	0	—	—	—	—	—
2006–07	Peoria Rivermen	AHL	32	8	6	14	43	—	—	—	—	—
2006–07	Yunost Minsk	BLR	1	0	0	0	2	7	3	1	4	12
2007–08	Yunost Minsk	BLR	42	12	25	37	128	5	0	1	1	31
2007–08	Yunior Minsk	BLR–2	2	1	3	4	4	—	—	—	—	—
2008–09	Yunost Minsk	BLR	46	14	28	42	83	14	3	2	5	32
2009–10	Dinamo Minsk	KHL	4	0	0	0	6	—	—	—	—	—
2009–10	Yunost Minsk	BLR	29	7	15	22	30	13	5	6	11	34
2010–11	Yunost Minsk	BLR	44	12	27	39	57	2	1	0	1	2
2011–12	Yunost Minsk	BLR	29	15	11	26	38	2	0	0	0	6
2012–13	Yunost Minsk	VHL	39	12	7	19	16	—	—	—	—	—
2012–13	Yunior Minsk	BLR	8	7	3	10	25	2	0	1	1	4
2013–14	Dinamo Minsk	KHL	44	0	6	6	18	—	—	—	—	—
2014–15	Dinamo Minsk	KHL	24	1	2	3	10	—	—	—	—	—
2015–16	Ertis Pavlodar	KAZ	12	1	3	4	0	—	—	—	—	—
2015–16	Yunost Minsk	BLR	18	8	8	16	41	11	1	4	5	16
2016–17	Yunost Minsk	BLR	36	18	18	36	46	13	4	7	11	24
2017–18	Yunost Minsk	BLR	35	7	13	20	42	3	0	0	0	2
BLR totals			388	152	201	353	689	81	23	25	48	173
KHL totals			72	1	8	9	34	—	—	—	—	—

=== International ===
Year	Team	Event	GP	G	A	Pts	PIM
2000	Belarus	WJC18	5	0	0	0	2
2001	Belarus	WJC	6	0	0	0	0
2001	Belarus	WJC18 D1	5	6	8	14	39
2002	Belarus	WJC	6	1	1	2	6
2002	Belarus	WJC18	8	1	5	6	20
2003	Belarus	WJC	4	1	1	2	4
2003	Belarus	WJC18	6	5	11	16	10
2004	Belarus	WJC D1	5	4	10	14	14
2005	Belarus	WJC	6	3	2	5	6
2010	Belarus	OLY	4	1	0	1	4
Junior totals			51	21	38	59	101
Senior totals			4	1	0	1	4
