= Sergei Zadelenov =

Belarusian ice hockey player

- Born: February 27, 1976 (age 50)
- Height: 6 ft 0 in (183 cm)
- Weight: 196 lb (89 kg; 14 st 0 lb)
- Position: Centre
- Shot: Left
- KHL team: HC Dynamo Minsk
- National team: Belarus
- Playing career: 1995–2021

Sergei Aleksandrovich Zadelenov (Russian: Серге́й Александрович Заделенов) (born 27 February 1976 in Navapolatsk, Byelorussian SSR, Soviet Union) is a Belarusian professional ice hockey centre. He currently plays for HC Dynamo Minsk of the Kontinental Hockey League.

Zadelenov was selected for the Belarus national men's ice hockey team in the 2010 Winter Olympics.

== Career statistics ==
=== Regular season and playoffs ===
			Regular season					Playoffs
Season	Team	League	GP	G	A	Pts	PIM	GP	G	A	Pts	PIM
1992–93	Khimik Novopolotsk	RUS.2	1	0	0	0	0	—	—	—	—	—
1992–93	Khimik–2 Novopolotsk	BLR	12	1	0	1	0	—	—	—	—	—
1993–94	Khimik Novopolotsk	BLR	2	0	1	1	0	—	—	—	—	—
1993–94	Khimik Novopolotsk	RUS.3	14	0	1	1	2	—	—	—	—	—
1994–95	Polimir Novopolotsk	BLR	5	0	0	0	0	—	—	—	—	—
1994–95	Polimir Novopolotsk	RUS.2	26	3	2	5	6	—	—	—	—	—
1995–96	Polimir Novopolotsk	EEHL	14	0	3	3	0	—	—	—	—	—
1996–97	Polimir Novopolotsk	BLR	11	2	9	11	4	—	—	—	—	—
1996–97	Polimir Novopolotsk	EEHL	32	11	19	30	8	—	—	—	—	—
1997–98	Polimir Novopolotsk	BLR	17	12	5	17	2	—	—	—	—	—
1997–98	Polimir Novopolotsk	EEHL	41	16	21	37	22	—	—	—	—	—
1998–99	Rubin Tyumen	RSL	29	3	3	6	8	—	—	—	—	—
1998–99	Rubin–2 Tyumen	RUS.3	1	0	0	0	0	—	—	—	—	—
1998–99	Dinamo–Energija Yekaterinburg	RUS.2	8	1	0	1	4	—	—	—	—	—
1999–2000	Dinamo–Energija Yekaterinburg	RSL	36	5	8	13	18	3	0	1	1	0
1999–2000	Dinamo–Energija–2 Yekaterinburg	RUS.3	2	2	1	3	0	—	—	—	—	—
1999–2000	Kedr Novouralsk	RUS.2	6	3	4	7	4	—	—	—	—	—
2000–01	Dinamo–Energija Yekaterinburg	RSL	39	5	8	13	8	—	—	—	—	—
2001–02	Dinamo–Energija Yekaterinburg	RUS.2	48	13	14	27	14	7	1	1	2	4
2002–03	Dinamo–Energija Yekaterinburg	RUS.2	42	9	19	28	16	—	—	—	—	—
2002–03	HK Gomel	BLR	10	2	5	7	2	6	2	1	3	2
2002–03	HK Gomel	EEHL	6	1	2	3	0	—	—	—	—	—
2002–03	HK–2 Gomel	BLR.2	2	0	3	3	0	—	—	—	—	—
2003–04	HK Gomel	BLR	41	4	23	27	18	10	3	5	8	4
2003–04	HK Gomel	EEHL	30	6	12	18	14	—	—	—	—	—
2004–05	Yunost Minsk	BLR	43	8	11	19	28	6	0	1	1	0
2005–06	HK Gomel	BLR	23	14	3	17	8	—	—	—	—	—
2005–06	Neftekhimik Nizhnekamsk	RSL	22	1	3	4	6	5	0	0	0	4
2005–06	Neftekhimik–2 Nizhnekamsk	RUS.3	2	0	0	0	0	—	—	—	—	—
2005–06	Dinamo Minsk	BLR	—	—	—	—	—	7	2	3	5	4
2006–07	Neftekhimik Nizhnekamsk	RSL	36	1	5	6	18	1	0	0	0	0
2006–07	Neftekhimik–2 Nizhnekamsk	RUS.3	2	3	1	4	0	—	—	—	—	—
2007–08	HK Gomel	BLR	49	11	20	31	94	—	—	—	—	—
2008–09	Dinamo Minsk	KHL	18	3	3	6	18	—	—	—	—	—
2009–10	Shakhter Soligorsk	BLR	15	7	5	12	4	—	—	—	—	—
2009–10	Dinamo Minsk	KHL	41	1	5	6	16	—	—	—	—	—
2010–11	Yunost Minsk	BLR	47	5	15	20	14	6	1	1	2	2
2011–12	Yunost Minsk	BLR	37	4	17	21	0	4	0	1	1	2
2012–13	Yunost Minsk	VHL	33	4	7	11	8	—	—	—	—	—
2012–13	Yunior Minsk	BLR	17	1	11	12	6	—	—	—	—	—
2013–14	Yunost Minsk	BLR	40	3	10	13	20	12	1	0	1	0
2014–15	Khimik–SKA Novopolotsk	BLR	44	4	16	20	20	3	0	1	1	6
2015–16	Khimik–SKA Novopolotsk	BLR	25	5	4	9	8	—	—	—	—	—
2015–16	Shakhter Soligorsk	BLR	5	0	0	0	2	6	0	1	1	0
2016–17	Khimik Novopolotsk	BLR	18	0	5	5	2	—	—	—	—	—
2018–19	Abu Dhabi Storms	UAE	16	2	25	27	28	4	3	4	7	0
2019–20	Abu Dhabi Storms	UAE	12	9	17	26	35	3	4	6	10	4
2020–21	Abu Dhabi Storms	UAE	8	4	6	10	34	6	2	4	6	2
BLR totals			461	83	160	243	232	60	9	14	23	20
RSL totals			162	12	35	47	58	9	0	1	1	4

=== International ===
Year	Team	Event	GP	G	A	Pts	PIM
1996	Belarus	WJC C	4	0	2	2	0
2002	Belarus	WC D1	5	0	4	4	2
2003	Belarus	WC	6	1	1	2	2
2004	Belarus	WC D1	5	0	0	0	2
2005	Belarus	OGQ	3	0	0	0	0
2005	Belarus	WC	6	1	1	2	4
2006	Belarus	WC	7	4	4	8	6
2007	Belarus	WC	6	0	6	6	0
2008	Belarus	WC	6	1	2	3	6
2010	Belarus	OG	4	0	0	0	0
Senior totals			48	7	18	25	22
