= Sergey Stas =

Belarusian ice hockey player

Personal information
- Nationality: Belarusian
- Born: 28 April 1974 (age 50); Minsk, Byelorussian SSR, Soviet Union

Sport
- Sport: Ice hockey

Sergey Stas (born 28 April 1974) is a Belarusian ice hockey player. He competed in the men's tournaments at the 1998 Winter Olympics and the 2002 Winter Olympics.

== Career statistics ==
=== Regular season and playoffs ===
			Regular season					Playoffs
Season	Team	League	GP	G	A	Pts	PIM	GP	G	A	Pts	PIM
1990–91	Progress Grodno	URS.2	2	0	0	0	0	—	—	—	—	—
1991–92	Khimik Novopolotsk	CIS.3	51	1	2	3	67	—	—	—	—	—
1992–93	Dinamo Minsk	RUS	27	1	0	1	14	—	—	—	—	—
1992–93	Tivali Minsk	BLR	11	0	0	0	4	—	—	—	—	—
1993–94	Tivali Minsk	BLR	6	0	0	0	6	—	—	—	—	—
1993–94	Tivali Minsk	RUS	14	0	0	0	68	—	—	—	—	—
1993–94	Erie Panthers	ECHL	2	1	2	3	4	—	—	—	—	—
1993–94	Brockville Braves	CJHL	30	5	14	19	152	—	—	—	—	—
1994–95	Erie Panthers	ECHL	35	1	15	16	108	—	—	—	—	—
1994–95	Greensboro Monarchs	ECHL	21	1	7	8	102	18	2	7	9	38
1995–96	Quad City Mallards	CoHL	15	2	7	9	30	4	0	1	1	14
1995–96	Phoenix Roadrunners	IHL	3	0	0	0	6	—	—	—	—	—
1995–96	Fort Wayne Komets	IHL	38	1	2	3	90	—	—	—	—	—
1996–97	Fort Wayne Komets	IHL	14	1	3	4	23	—	—	—	—	—
1996–97	Las Vegas Thunder	IHL	12	0	1	1	39	—	—	—	—	—
1996–97	San Antonio Dragons	IHL	9	1	1	2	40	—	—	—	—	—
1996–97	Saginaw Lumber Kings	CoHL	29	5	17	22	63	—	—	—	—	—
1997–98	Nürnberg Ice Tigers	DEL	39	12	14	26	74	5	1	1	2	6
1998–99	Nürnberg Ice Tigers	DEL	51	2	18	20	163	6	1	0	1	35
1999–2000	Revier Löwen Oberhausen	DEL	51	6	12	18	112	—	—	—	—	—
2000–01	Augsburger Panther	DEL	60	9	27	36	128	—	—	—	—	—
2001–02	Krefeld Pinguine	DEL	55	7	13	20	84	2	1	0	1	2
2002–03	Krefeld Pinguine	DEL	51	5	6	11	134	13	0	0	0	8
2003–04	Wölfe Freiburg	DEL	51	6	32	38	138	—	—	—	—	—
2004–05	HK Gomel	BLR	3	0	1	1	2	—	—	—	—	—
2004–05	Moskitos Essen	GER.2	18	3	8	11	63	—	—	—	—	—
2005–06	Dresdner Eislöwen	GER.2	48	8	15	23	76	8	0	0	0	34
2006–07	Dresdner Eislöwen	GER.2	44	9	8	17	117	—	—	—	—	—
2007–08	Yunost Minsk	BLR	40	2	5	7	102	4	0	0	0	0
2008–09	Wölfe Freiburg	GER.2	42	6	20	26	147	—	—	—	—	—
2009–10	Wölfe Freiburg	GER.2	44	5	20	25	143	—	—	—	—	—
2010–11	Shakhtyor Soligorsk	BLR	31	2	3	5	69	7	1	2	3	22
2011–12	Shakhtyor Soligorsk	BLR	46	10	14	24	67	8	0	1	1	10
2012–13	Shakhtyor Soligorsk	BLR	46	5	15	20	68	8	2	1	3	22
2013–14	Shakhtyor Soligorsk	BLR	33	3	11	14	40	—	—	—	—	—
2013–14	HK Gomel	BLR	13	0	2	2	6	10	0	2	2	6
2014–15	HK Gomel	BLR	42	3	17	20	34	5	1	0	1	6
BLR totals			271	25	68	93	398	42	4	6	10	66
DEL totals			358	47	122	169	833	26	3	1	4	51
GER.2 totals			196	31	72	103	546	8	0	0	0	34

=== International ===
Year	Team	Event	GP	G	A	Pts	PIM
1992	Belarus	WC C Q	2	1	0	1	4
1997	Belarus	WC B	5	0	1	1	6
1998	Belarus	OG	7	0	1	1	8
1998	Belarus	WC	6	2	0	2	8
2000	Belarus	WC	6	2	1	3	10
2001	Belarus	OGQ	3	0	0	0	4
2001	Belarus	WC	6	1	0	1	2
2002	Belarus	OG	9	0	1	1	16
2002	Belarus	WC D1	5	0	4	4	4
2003	Belarus	WC	6	0	0	0	4
2004	Belarus	WC D1	5	0	3	3	4
2005	Belarus	OGQ	3	0	1	1	0
Senior totals			63	6	12	18	70

"Sergei Stas". Elite Prospects.
