= Alexander Makritski =

Belarusian ice hockey player

- Born: 11 August 1971 (age 55) Minsk, Belarus
- Position: Defenceman
- BIHA team: Belarus
- Playing career: 1989–2011

Alexander Mikhailevich Makritski (Belarusian: Аляксандр Мікалаевіч Макрыцкі) (born 11 August 1971 in Minsk) is a Belarusian professional ice hockey defenceman and coach.

== Career ==
During his career, Makritski played hockey in Belarus, Germany, and Russia. He also participated in the 2010 IIHF World Championship as a member of the Belarus National men's ice hockey team. In 2019, he became the head coach of Yunost Minsk.

== Career statistics ==
=== Regular season and playoffs ===
			Regular season					Playoffs
Season	Team	League	GP	G	A	Pts	PIM	GP	G	A	Pts	PIM
1989–90	Progress Grodno	URS.2	10	0	1	1	4	—	—	—	—	—
1990–91	Khimik Novopolotsk	URS.3	68	4	10	14	84	—	—	—	—	—
1991–92	Khimik Novopolotsk	CIS.3	68	4	10	14	89	—	—	—	—	—
1992–93	Dinamo Minsk	IHL	30	0	1	1	28	—	—	—	—	—
1992–93	Khimik Novopolotsk	RUS.2	5	0	1	1	2	—	—	—	—	—
1992–93	Tivali Minsk	BLR	11	2	5	7	8	—	—	—	—	—
1993–94	Tivali Minsk	IHL	33	0	2	2	50	—	—	—	—	—
1993–94	Tivali Minsk	BLR	15	1	4	5	12	—	—	—	—	—
1994–95	Tivali Minsk	IHL	43	1	6	7	50	—	—	—	—	—
1994–95	Tivali Minsk	BLR	10	4	9	13	28	—	—	—	—	—
1995–96	Avangard Omsk	IHL	10	0	3	3	6	—	—	—	—	—
1995–96	Lada Togliatti	IHL	30	0	4	4	22	4	0	0	0	0
1995–96	Lada–2 Togliatti	RUS.2	2	1	0	1	2	—	—	—	—	—
1996–97	Lada Togliatti	RSL	4	0	1	1	8	—	—	—	—	—
1996–97	Neftekhimik Nizhnekamsk	RSL	19	1	5	6	24	—	—	—	—	—
1997–98	Neftekhimik Nizhnekamsk	RSL	45	2	2	4	41	—	—	—	—	—
1998–99	Severstal Cherepovets	RSL	15	0	2	2	24	—	—	—	—	—
1998–99	Severstal–2 Cherepovets	RUS.2	5	1	0	1	8	—	—	—	—	—
1998–99	Dinamo–Energija Yekaterinburg	RUS.2	11	2	1	3	10	—	—	—	—	—
1999–2000	Revier Löwen Oberhausen	DEL	54	1	4	5	89	—	—	—	—	—
2000–01	Revier Löwen Oberhausen	DEL	59	3	8	11	71	3	0	2	2	2
2001–02	Revier Löwen Oberhausen	DEL	57	2	3	5	77	—	—	—	—	—
2002–03	Krylia Sovetov Moscow	RSL	44	1	4	5	62	—	—	—	—	—
2003–04	Khimik Voskresensk	RSL	5	0	0	0	2	—	—	—	—	—
2003–04	Wölfe Freiburg	DEL	34	0	9	9	42	—	—	—	—	—
2004–05	HK Gomel	BLR	29	2	11	13	59	5	2	1	3	4
2004–05	HK–2 Gomel	BLR.2	1	0	1	1	0	—	—	—	—	—
2005–06	Dinamo Minsk	BLR	55	2	18	20	86	10	0	5	5	42
2006–07	Dinamo Minsk	BLR	49	1	14	15	86	11	0	0	0	54
2007–08	Keramin Minsk	BLR	48	1	14	15	54	10	1	5	6	29
2008–09	Dinamo Minsk	KHL	45	2	5	7	69	—	—	—	—	—
2009–10	Dinamo Minsk	KHL	15	0	3	3	10	—	—	—	—	—
2009–10	Shakhtyor Soligorsk	BLR	1	0	0	0	0	—	—	—	—	—
2010–11	Metallurg Zhlobin	BLR	33	0	17	17	53	4	1	0	1	0
IHL totals			146	1	16	17	156	4	0	0	0	0
BLR totals			251	13	92	105	386	40	4	11	15	129
RSL totals			122	4	14	18	161	—	—	—	—	—

=== International ===
Year	Team	Event	GP	G	A	Pts	PIM
1994	Belarus	WC C	6	0	1	1	4
1995	Belarus	WC C	4	0	0	0	0
1996	Belarus	WC B	7	0	3	3	8
1997	Belarus	WC B	5	1	1	2	16
2000	Belarus	WC	6	0	0	0	2
2002	Belarus	OG	9	0	0	0	10
2002	Belarus	WC D1	5	1	0	1	4
2003	Belarus	WC	6	1	1	2	10
2004	Belarus	WC D1	5	1	0	1	0
2005	Belarus	WC	6	0	0	0	2
2006	Belarus	WC	7	1	1	2	8
2007	Belarus	WC	6	0	0	0	8
2008	Belarus	WC	1	0	0	0	0
2009	Belarus	WC	1	0	0	0	0
2010	Belarus	OG	4	0	0	0	4
2010	Belarus	WC	4	0	1	1	2
Senior totals			82	5	8	13	78
