= Mikhail Stefanovich =

Belarusian ice hockey player

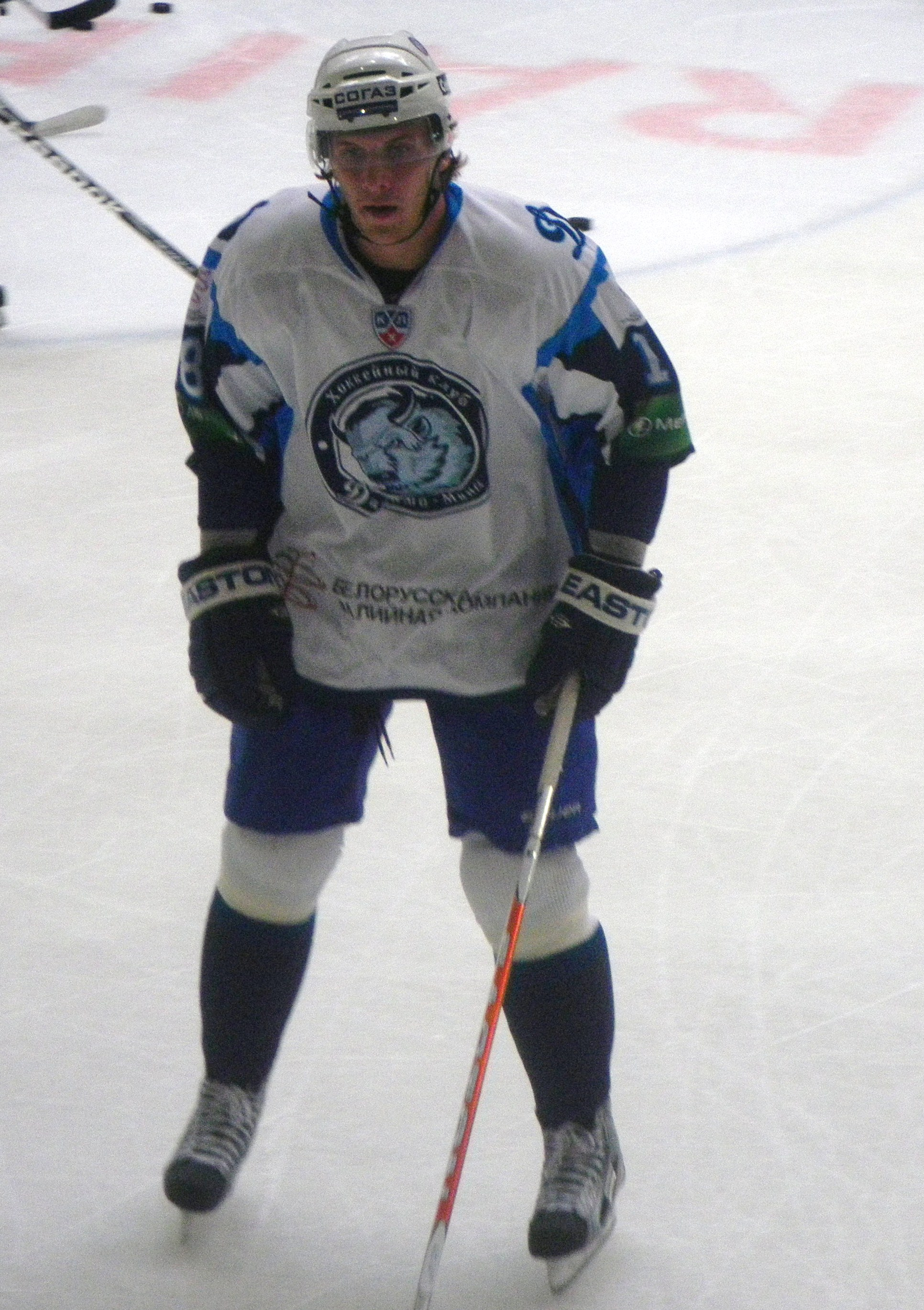
- Stefanovich with HC Dinamo Minsk in 2011
- Born: 27 November 1989 (age 36) Minsk, Byelorussian SSR, Soviet Union
- Height: 6 ft 2 in (188 cm)
- Weight: 214 lb (97 kg; 15 st 4 lb)
- Position: Right wing
- Shoots: Right
- BXL team Former teams: Shakhter Soligorsk; HC Donbass; Yunost Minsk; Dinamo Minsk; HK Neman Grodno; HK Gomel
- National team: Belarus
- NHL draft: 98th overall, 2008; Toronto Maple Leafs
- Playing career: 2006–present

Mikhail Igoravich Stefanovich (Belarusian: Міхаіл Ігаравіч Стэфановіч; born 27 November 1989) is a Belarusian professional ice hockey player currently playing for Shakhter Soligorsk of the Belarusian Extraliga (BXL). He was drafted by the Toronto Maple Leafs in the fourth round of the 2008 NHL entry draft, and was the 2nd overall pick in the 2009 KHL Junior Draft. He played 60 games in the Kontinental Hockey League with Dinamo Minsk between 2010 and 2020. Internationally Stefanovich has played for the Belarusian national team at five World Championships.

== Playing career ==
Stefanovich's career started out in his home country of Belarus, spending just over two seasons in Belarus' tier two hockey league – half a season with HC Dinamo-2 Minsk, and just over one and a half seasons with HC Homiel-2. After playing just three games with HC Homiel-2 in the 2006–07 tier two season, HC Homiel of the Belarusian Extraliga called him up. He finished the rest of the season with Homiel.

Following the season, Stefanovich was selected 54th overall in the 2007 CHL Import Draft by the Quebec Remparts. Upon arriving in Canada, Stefanovich made the Remparts roster. Halfway through his inaugural QMJHL season, Stefanovich was selected to play in the CHL Top Prospects Game and, following the conclusion of the season, received the Mike Bossy Trophy, which is awarded to the QMJHL player judged to be the best professional prospect.

On 1 June 2009, Stefanovich was selected second overall in the 2009 KHL Junior Draft by HC Dinamo Minsk. Two days later, on 3 June, he was signed to an entry-level contract by the Maple Leafs. On 19 September 2009, Stefanovich was assigned to the Toronto Marlies, the AHL affiliate of the Maple Leafs, and shortly after demoted back to junior.

On 15 September 2010, the Maple Leafs announced that Stefanovich would be part of the team's 63-player training camp roster, however, eight days later, the team assigned him to the Toronto Marlies. Stefanovich was named to the Marlies' opening day roster on 8 October, but was reassigned to the Reading Royals on 14 October 2010. On 18 October, Stefanovich was recalled to the Marlies. After playing only 2 games with the Marlies, he was again reassigned to the Royals on 22 November 2010. Stefanovich was loaned out to HC Dinamo Minsk of the KHL on 27 November 2010. On 13 January 2011, Stefanovich's NHL rights were traded by the Maple Leafs to the Dallas Stars for Fabian Brunnstrom.

During his second season in the Russian second-tier league, the VHL, with Dizel Penza, Stefanovich was provisionally suspended on 20 November for failing an anti-doping test. He played no further part in the season with Dizel and on 27 April 2015, was given a two-year ban backdated to 10 November, for the doping violation.

On 26 August 2015, he returned to North American and signed a one-year ECHL contract with the Rapid City Rush.

== International play ==
Stefanovich has played in the three World Juniors. He also participated at the 2010 IIHF World Championship as a member of the Belarus men's national ice hockey team.

== Career statistics ==
=== Regular season and playoffs ===
			Regular season					Playoffs
Season	Team	League	GP	G	A	Pts	PIM	GP	G	A	Pts	PIM
2004–05	Dinamo Minsk-2	BEL-2	19	3	7	10	8	—	—	—	—	—
2004–05	HK Gomel-2	BEL-2	14	3	0	3	6	—	—	—	—	—
2005–06	HK Gomel-2	BEL-2	37	18	12	30	64	—	—	—	—	—
2006–07	HK Gomel	BEL	41	16	9	25	43	5	1	0	1	2
2006–07	HK Gomel-2	BEL-2	3	3	1	4	4	—	—	—	—	—
2007–08	HK Gomel	BEL	1	0	0	0	0	—	—	—	—	—
2007–08	Quebec Remparts	QMJHL	62	32	34	66	32	11	4	4	8	10
2008–09	Quebec Remparts	QMJHL	56	49	27	76	17	17	11	5	16	6
2009–10	Quebec Remparts	QMJHL	53	25	43	68	24	8	3	9	12	0
2010–11	Reading Royals	ECHL	4	3	2	5	2	—	—	—	—	—
2010–11	Toronto Marlies	AHL	2	0	0	0	0	—	—	—	—	—
2010–11	Dinamo Minsk	KHL	21	1	0	1	4	4	1	1	2	0
2011–12	Dinamo Minsk	KHL	5	0	0	0	2	—	—	—	—	—
2011–12	HK Gomel	BEL	39	25	20	45	40	8	6	1	7	31
2012–13	HK Gomel	BEL	49	17	29	46	14	5	0	1	1	4
2013–14	Toros Neftekamsk	VHL	14	3	2	5	4	—	—	—	—	—
2013–14	HC Lada Togliatti	VHL	24	7	4	11	4	5	2	1	3	4
2014–15	Dizel Penza	VHL	12	3	6	6	—	—	—	—	—
2015–16	Rapid City Rush	ECHL	52	19	11	30	8	—	—	—	—	—
2016–17	Neman Grodno	BEL	26	8	10	18	12	12	8	3	11	6
2017–18	Neman Grodno	BEL	40	24	17	41	20	16	4	3	7	8
2018–19	Yunost Minsk	BEL	56	32	25	57	22	13	7	3	10	10
2019–20	Dinamo Minsk	KHL	34	5	3	8	13	—	—	—	—	—
2019–20	Yunost Minsk	BEL	11	6	5	11	4	14	5	9	14	4
2020–21	Yunost Minsk	BEL	46	22	13	35	8	12	4	8	12	12
2021–22	HC Donbass	UKR	1	0	1	1	0	—	—	—	—	—
2021–22	Shakhter Soligorsk	BEL	36	17	12	29	13	11	5	5	10	6
2022–23	Shakhter Soligorsk	BEL	51	25	32	57	35	10	0	3	3	2
KHL totals			60	6	3	9	19	4	1	1	2	0
BEL totals			395	192	172	364	211	106	40	37	77	83

=== International ===
Year	Team	Event	GP	G	A	Pts	PIM
2006	Belarus	WJC18	6	2	4	6	24
2007	Belarus	WJC18-D1	5	9	3	12	16
2007	Belarus	WJC	6	4	1	5	8
2008	Belarus	WJC	5	3	1	4	2
2009	Belarus	WJC	5	4	2	6	4
2009	Belarus	WC	4	0	0	0	0
2010	Belarus	WC	6	2	0	2	2
2013	Belarus	WC	6	0	0	0	2
2017	Belarus	WC	7	0	4	4	0
2021	Belarus	WC	7	2	1	3	4
Junior totals			27	22	11	33	54
Senior totals			30	4	5	9	8

== Awards ==
- QMJHL Rookie Player of the Month (September 2007)
- RDS Rookie Excellence Award (QMJHL) (Mid-season) (2007–08)
- Mike Bossy Trophy – 2007–08 (Top QMJHL Professional Prospect)
