= Sergei Kolosov =

Belarusian ice hockey player (born 1986)

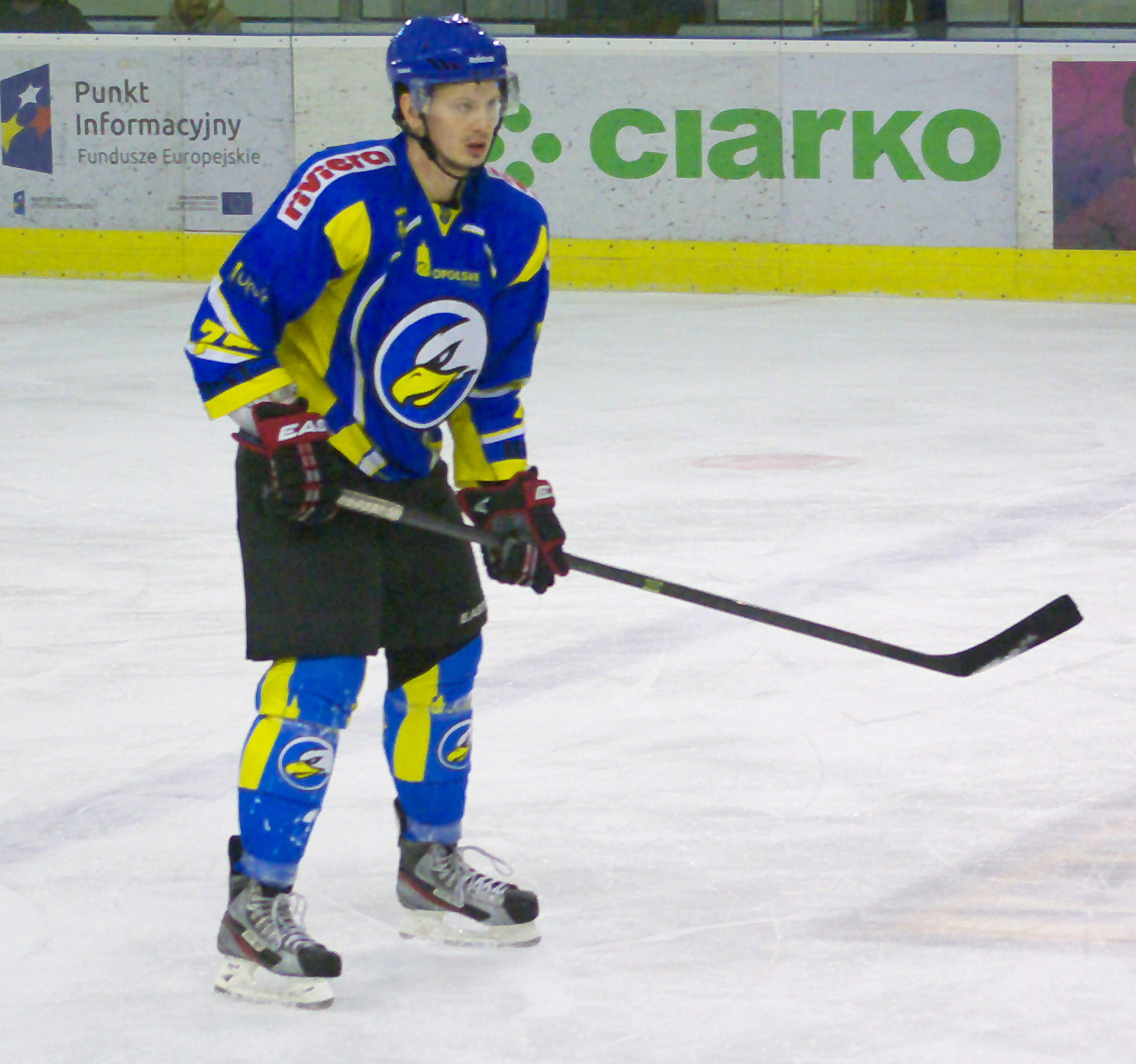
- Born: May 22, 1986 (age 38); Navapolatsk, Byelorussian SSR, URS
- Height: 6 ft 4 in (193 cm)
- Weight: 210 lb (95 kg; 15 st 0 lb)
- Position: Defence
- Shot: Left
- Played for: Generals Kyiv; Orlik Opole; KS Cracovia; HK Neman Grodno; HC Dynamo Minsk (Belarus); Yunost Minsk (Belarus); Grand Rapids Griffins (AHL)
- National team: Belarus
- NHL draft: 151st overall, 2004; Detroit Red Wings
- Playing career: 2003–2017

Sergei Afanasyevich Kolosov (Russian: Серге́й Афанасьевич Колосов; born May 22, 1986) is a Belarusian former ice hockey defenceman. He last played with Generals Kyiv of the Ukrainian Hockey League. Kolosov was drafted by the Detroit Red Wings of the National Hockey League (NHL) in 2004, and signed a contract with the team on June 25, 2008.

He played for the Belarusian national team at the 2008, 2010, and 2011 World Championships, as well as the 2010 Winter Olympics.

== Career statistics ==
=== Regular season and playoffs ===
			Regular season					Playoffs
Season	Team	League	GP	G	A	Pts	PIM	GP	G	A	Pts	PIM
2002–03	Yunost Minsk	BLR	14	0	1	1	10	—	—	—	—	—
2002–03	Polimir Novopolotsk	BLR	7	0	0	0	4	—	—	—	—	—
2002–03	Polimir–2 Novopolotsk	BLR.2	14	1	3	4	24	—	—	—	—	—
2003–04	Yunior Minsk	BLR	4	0	1	1	6	—	—	—	—	—
2003–04	Yunost Minsk	BLR	43	0	4	4	28	9	1	2	3	10
2003–04	Yunost–2 Minsk	BLR.2	3	1	0	1	2	—	—	—	—	—
2004–05	Dinamo Minsk	BLR	37	2	6	8	24	—	—	—	—	—
2004–05	Dinamo–2 Minsk	BLR.2	7	1	1	2	4	—	—	—	—	—
2004–05	Yunost Minsk	BLR	1	0	0	0	2	9	0	0	0	4
2005–06	Cedar Rapids RoughRiders	USHL	50	2	8	10	66	8	0	0	0	10
2006–07	Cedar Rapids RoughRiders	USHL	51	1	10	11	79	5	0	0	0	4
2007–08	Dinamo Minsk	BLR	47	4	6	10	73	8	1	3	4	10
2008–09	Grand Rapids Griffins	AHL	70	4	7	11	36	10	0	0	0	9
2009–10	Grand Rapids Griffins	AHL	66	2	6	8	29	—	—	—	—	—
2010–11	Grand Rapids Griffins	AHL	56	0	1	1	48	—	—	—	—	—
2011–12	Neman Grodno	BLR	48	4	8	12	63	14	2	1	3	10
2012–13	Neman Grodno	BLR	45	3	13	16	55	3	1	0	1	0
2013–14	Neman Grodno	BLR	46	2	6	8	26	14	1	2	3	20
2013–14	Neman–2 Grodno	BLR.2	1	0	0	0	0	—	—	—	—	—
2014–15	Neman Grodno	BLR	7	0	0	0	8	—	—	—	—	—
2014–15	Neman–2 Grodno	BLR.2	2	1	1	2	2	—	—	—	—	—
2014–15	KS Cracovia	POL	6	1	0	1	2	2	0	0	0	0
2015–16	HK Gomel	BLR	15	2	2	4	43	—	—	—	—	—
2015–16	Orlik Opole	POL	14	2	6	8	16	3	0	0	0	0
2016–17	Generals Kyiv	UKR	10	0	1	1	8	—	—	—	—	—
BLR totals			314	17	47	64	342	57	6	8	14	54
AHL totals			192	6	14	20	113	10	0	0	0	9

=== International ===
Year	Team	Event	GP	G	A	Pts	PIM
2003	Belarus	WJC18	6	0	1	1	14
2004	Belarus	WJC D1	5	0	2	2	6
2004	Belarus	WJC18	5	1	0	1	24
2005	Belarus	WJC	6	0	0	0	6
2006	Belarus	WJC D1	5	1	4	5	29
2008	Belarus	WC	6	0	0	0	2
2010	Belarus	OG	4	0	0	0	0
2010	Belarus	WC	6	0	0	0	2
2011	Belarus	WC	6	0	0	0	4
Junior totals			27	2	7	9	79
Senior totals			22	0	0	0	8
