= Andriy Mikhnov =

Ukrainian ice hockey player

Andriy Mikhnov Андрій Міхнов
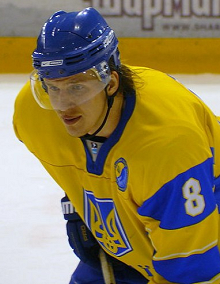
- Born: 26 November 1983 (age 42) Kyiv, Ukrainian SSR, Soviet Union
- Height: 6 ft 6 in (198 cm)
- Weight: 196 lb (89 kg; 14 st 0 lb)
- Position: Left wing
- Shoots: Left
- IHL team Former teams: HC Fassa Falcons; CSKA Moskva; CSK VVS Samara; Lada Togliatti; Salavat Yulaev Ufa; Ak Bars Kazan; Traktor Chelyabinsk; Neftekhimik Nizhnekamsk; HC Donbass-2; HC Berkut; Yunost Minsk; Metallurg Zhlobin; GKS Tychy; Sokil Kyiv; Steaua Rangers
- National team: Ukraine
- NHL draft: 62nd overall, 2002; St. Louis Blues
- Playing career: 2003–present
Medal record
Representing Ukraine
Men's ice hockey
World Championships Division I
Silver medal – second place	2010 Netherlands Division I A
Gold medal – first place	2013 Ukraine Division I B
Gold medal – first place	2016 Croatia Division I B
Silver medal – second place	2009 Poland Division I B
Bronze medal – third place	2011 Ukraine Division I B

Andriy Pavlovych "Andrei" Mikhnov (Ukrainian: Андрій Павлович Міхнов; born 26 November 1983) is a Ukrainian professional ice hockey player currently playing for Fassa of the Italian Hockey League (IHL).

He was drafted in the second round of the 2002 NHL entry draft by the St. Louis Blues. He plays center and left wing and shoots left. He is also a member of the Ukrainian national team and has played in several international tournaments, including the 2006 World Championships. His brother, Alexei, is also a professional ice hockey player, but opted to represent Russia.

In 2013, when a heart condition was detected in Mikhnov, he was barred from playing in Russia. Mikhnov claims that this was a misdiagnosis, and continued his professional career outside of Russia, where he was unable to gain medical clearance despite documents from Germany.

== Career statistics ==
=== Regular season and playoffs ===
			Regular season					Playoffs
Season	Team	League	GP	G	A	Pts	PIM	GP	G	A	Pts	PIM
1999–2000	Kristall–2 Elektrostal	RUS.3	26	4	7	11	10	—	—	—	—	—
2000–01	CSKA Moscow	RUS.2	4	0	0	0	2	—	—	—	—	—
2000–01	CSKA–2 Moscow	RUS.3	6	2	4	6	2	—	—	—	—	—
2001–02	Salavat Yulaev–2 Ufa	RUS.3	2	1	0	1	0	—	—	—	—	—
2001–02	Sudbury Wolves	OHL	67	14	18	32	43	—	—	—	—	—
2002–03	Kingston Frontenacs	OHL	39	7	11	18	24	—	—	—	—	—
2002–03	Toronto St. Michael's Majors	OHL	26	1	6	7	23	13	0	2	2	4
2003–04	CSK VVS Samara	RUS.2	40	8	2	10	10	—	—	—	—	—
2003–04	CSK VVS–2 Samara	RUS.3	2	2	0	2	0	—	—	—	—	—
2003–04	Lada–2 Togliatti	RUS.3	34	12	10	22	14	4	2	0	2	0
2004–05	Lada Togliatti	RSL	2	0	0	0	0	—	—	—	—	—
2004–05	Lada–2 Togliatti	RUS.3	23	21	13	34	10	—	—	—	—	—
2004–05	Salavat Yulaev Ufa	RSL	13	1	2	3	2	—	—	—	—	—
2004–05	Salavat Yulaev–2 Ufa	RUS.3	5	2	2	4	0	—	—	—	—	—
2005–06	Lada Togliatti	RSL	42	4	5	9	47	8	0	1	1	6
2006–07	Ak Bars Kazan	RSL	36	5	5	10	12	—	—	—	—	—
2006–07	Ak Bars–2 Kazan	RUS.3	10	3	11	14	2	—	—	—	—	—
2007–08	Traktor Chelyabinsk	RSL	32	6	3	9	10	1	0	0	0	0
2007–08	Traktor–2 Chelyabinsk	RUS.3	11	6	2	8	2	—	—	—	—	—
2008–09	Lada Togliatti	KHL	50	5	8	13	61	—	—	—	—	—
2008–09	Lada–2 Togliatti	RUS.3	1	1	0	1	0	—	—	—	—	—
2009–10	Lada Togliatti	KHL	48	4	4	8	10	—	—	—	—	—
2010–11	Neftekhimik Nizhnekamsk	KHL	11	1	1	2	2	—	—	—	—	—
2011–12	HC–2 Donbass	UKR	17	6	10	16	0	—	—	—	—	—
2012–13	Berkut Kyiv	UKR	34	12	19	31	31	—	—	—	—	—
2013–14	Metallurg Zhlobin	BLR	45	14	26	40	33	7	0	2	2	0
2014–15	Metallurg Zhlobin	BLR	54	21	26	47	20	2	0	0	0	0
2015–16	Yunost Minsk	BLR	40	22	16	38	6	14	5	4	9	6
2016–17	Yunost Minsk	BLR	39	28	42	70	12	13	9	6	15	4
2017–18	Yunost Minsk	BLR	38	14	27	41	14	15	4	8	12	4
2018–19	GKS Tychy	POL	40	18	30	48	34	20	2	4	6	8
2019–20	Metallurg Zhlobin	BLR	53	2	17	19	2	4	1	0	1	2
2020–21	Sokil Kyiv	UKR	36	9	21	30	18	11	3	5	8	2
2021–22	Sokil Kyiv	UKR	26	15	14	29	4	—	—	—	—	—
RSL totals			125	16	15	31	71	9	0	1	1	6
KHL totals			109	10	13	23	73	—	—	—	—	—
BLR totals			269	101	154	255	87	55	19	20	39	16

=== International ===
Year	Team	Event	GP	G	A	Pts	PIM
2006	Ukraine	WC	6	2	0	2	2
2009	Ukraine	OGQ	3	0	0	0	0
2009	Ukraine	WC D1	5	1	1	2	0
2010	Ukraine	WC D1	5	3	9	12	2
2011	Ukraine	WC D1	5	1	3	4	0
2012	Ukraine	WC D1A	5	1	0	1	2
2013	Ukraine	OGQ	6	2	1	3	0
2013	Ukraine	WC D1B	5	3	1	4	0
2014	Ukraine	WC D1A	4	2	2	4	6
2015	Ukraine	WC D1A	5	1	2	3	0
2016	Ukraine	WC D1B	5	2	2	4	2
2016	Ukraine	OGQ	3	1	2	3	0
2018	Ukraine	WC D1B	5	1	3	4	4
2020	Ukraine	OGQ	3	0	1	1	2
2022	Ukraine	WC D1B	4	0	6	6	0
Senior totals			74	22	38	60	24
