= Daniel Corso =

Canadian ice hockey player

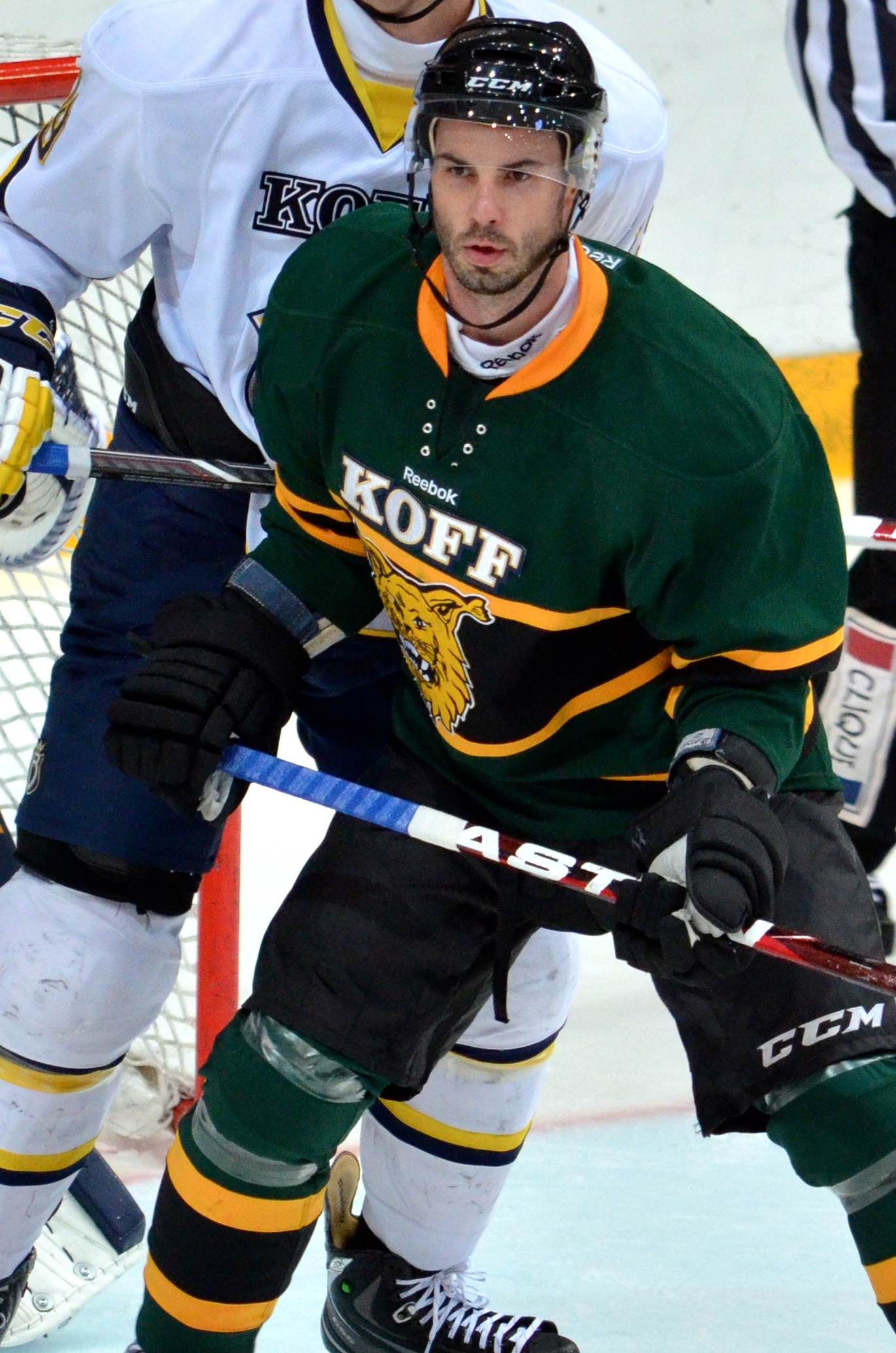
- Corso with Ilves in 2013
- Born: April 3, 1978 (age 46); Montreal, Quebec, Canada
- Height: 5 ft 10 in (178 cm)
- Weight: 180 lb (82 kg; 12 st 12 lb)
- Position: Centre
- Shot: Left
- Played for: St. Louis Blues; Atlanta Thrashers; Kassel Huskies; Frankfurt Lions; Torpedo Nizhny Novgorod; Kärpät; Timrå IK; Dinamo Minsk; Ilves Tampere
- NHL draft: 169th overall, 1996; St. Louis Blues
- Playing career: 1998–2018

Daniel Corso (born April 3, 1978) is a Canadian former professional ice hockey centre.

== Playing career ==
Corso was born in Montreal, Quebec and raised in Saint-Hubert, Quebec. As a youth, he played in the 1992 Quebec International Pee-Wee Hockey Tournament with the Richelieu Champlain minor ice hockey team.

Corso was drafted 169th overall by the St. Louis Blues. He made his NHL debut with the Blues in the 2000–01 season, and later played for the Atlanta Thrashers. Corso played 77 regular season games in the National Hockey League, scoring 14 goals with 11 assists for 25 points and collecting 20 penalty minutes. He also spent two seasons in Germany's Deutsche Eishockey Liga, playing for the Kassel Huskies and the Frankfurt Lions.

On August 14, 2008, Corso signed a one-year contract with Finnish SM-liiga team Kärpät for the 2008–09 season.

During his second season with Timrå IK in 2010–11, Corso was released from his contract and transferred to Belarusian KHL club, HC Dinamo Minsk on December 31, 2010.

== Career statistics ==
=== Regular season and playoffs ===
			Regular season					Playoffs
Season	Team	League	GP	G	A	Pts	PIM	GP	G	A	Pts	PIM
1993–94	Magog Cantonniers	QMAAA	36	17	22	39		12	10	12	22
1994–95	Victoriaville Tigres	QMJHL	65	27	26	53	6	4	2	5	7	2
1995–96	Victoriaville Tigres	QMJHL	65	49	65	114	77	12	6	7	13	4
1996–97	Victoriaville Tigres	QMJHL	54	51	68	119	50	—	—	—	—	—
1997–98	Victoriaville Tigres	QMJHL	35	24	51	75	20	3	1	1	2	2
1998–99	Worcester IceCats	AHL	63	14	14	28	26	—	—	—	—	—
1999–2000	Worcester IceCats	AHL	71	21	34	55	19	9	2	3	5	10
2000–01	Worcester IceCats	AHL	52	19	37	56	47	—	—	—	—	—
2000–01	St. Louis Blues	NHL	28	10	3	13	14	12	0	1	1	0
2001–02	St. Louis Blues	NHL	41	4	7	11	6	2	0	0	0	0
2002–03	St. Louis Blues	NHL	1	0	0	0	0	—	—	—	—	—
2002–03	Worcester IceCats	AHL	1	0	0	0	0	—	—	—	—	—
2003–04	Binghamton Senators	AHL	32	7	11	18	16	—	—	—	—	—
2003–04	Chicago Wolves	AHL	29	8	18	26	15	10	1	5	6	0
2003–04	Atlanta Thrashers	NHL	7	0	1	1	0	—	—	—	—	—
2004–05	Kassel Huskies	DEL	45	8	30	38	32	—	—	—	—	—
2005–06	Frankfurt Lions	DEL	29	11	17	28	57	—	—	—	—	—
2006–07	Philadelphia Phantoms	AHL	6	2	4	6	4	—	—	—	—	—
2006–07	Springfield Falcons	AHL	58	13	33	46	35	—	—	—	—	—
2007–08	Torpedo Nizhny Novgorod	RSL	22	2	5	7	18	—	—	—	—	—
2007–08	Hamilton Bulldogs	AHL	35	7	18	25	12	—	—	—	—	—
2008–09	Kärpät	SM-l	41	22	30	52	45	13	2	5	7	16
2009–10	Timrå IK	SEL	49	16	28	44	68	1	0	1	1	2
2010–11	Timrå IK	SEL	18	7	7	14	41	—	—	—	—	—
2010–11	Dinamo Minsk	KHL	13	3	5	8	6	7	2	3	5	12
2011–12	Dinamo Minsk	KHL	50	15	12	27	64	—	—	—	—	—
2012–13	Dinamo Minsk	KHL	4	0	1	1	0	—	—	—	—	—
2012–13	Lausanne HC	NLB	9	7	8	15	36	20	11	14	25	82
2013–14	Ilves	Liiga	23	6	5	11	48	—	—	—	—	—
2013–14	LeKi	Mestis	7	2	1	3	2	—	—	—	—	—
2013–14	EHC Olten	NLB	—	—	—	—	—	1	0	0	0	27
2014–15	Yunost Minsk	BXL	9	2	2	4	10	12	1	13	14	52
2015–16	Yunost Minsk	BXL	28	12	15	27	111	8	2	2	4	10
2016–17	Yunost Minsk	BXL	28	16	33	49	43	3	0	1	1	2
2017–18	Yunost Minsk	BXL	19	11	13	24	12	6	0	3	3	6
AHL totals			347	91	169	260	174	19	3	8	11	10
NHL totals			77	14	11	25	20	14	0	1	1	0
BXL totals			84	41	63	104	176	29	3	19	22	70

=== International ===
Year	Team	Event	Result	GP	G	A	Pts	PIM
1998	Canada	WJC	8th	7	0	3	3	4
Junior totals				7	0	3	3	4

== Awards and honours ==
Award	Year
QMJHL
Michel Briere Trophy	1997
CHL Second All-Star Team	1997
