= 2008–09 Belarusian Extraliga season =

Ice hockey season

2008–09 Extraliga
- League: Extraliga
- Sport: Ice hockey
- Teams: 14

Regular season
- Best record: HK Yunost Minsk
- Runners-up: HK Gomel

Playoffs

Finals
- Champions: HK Yunost Minsk
- Runners-up: HK Gomel

Belarusian Extraliga seasons
- ← 2007–08 2009–10 →

The 2008–09 Belarusian Extraliga season was the 17th season of the Belarusian Extraliga, the top level of ice hockey in Belarus. 14 teams participated in the league, and HK Yunost Minsk won the championship.

== Regular season ==
	Club	GP	W	OTW	SOW	SOL	OTL	L	Goals	Pts
1.	(Belarus) HK Yunost Minsk	52	38	3	2	0	2	7	198:96	126
2.	(Belarus) HK Gomel	52	33	1	1	4	0	13	152:113	107
3.	(Belarus) Metallurg Zhlobin	52	27	6	5	1	0	13	168:118	104
4.	(Belarus) HK Khimvolokno Mogilev	52	24	1	7	3	4	13	162:135	95
5.	(Belarus) HK Vitebsk	52	26	1	3	3	4	15	143:110	93
6.	(Belarus) HK Keramin Minsk	52	28	0	3	1	1	19	165:125	92
7.	(Belarus) HK Neman Grodno	52	25	2	2	6	1	16	173:134	90
8.	(Latvia) HK Liepājas Metalurgs	52	27	0	1	1	2	21	172:148	86
9.	(Belarus) Khimik-SKA Novopolotsk	52	19	3	1	4	2	23	170:176	71
10.	(Belarus) Shinnik Bobruisk	52	17	1	2	2	2	28	124:165	61
11.	(Latvia) HK Riga 2000	52	14	2	5	3	1	27	149:188	60
12.	(Latvia) ASK/Ogre	52	10	1	3	1	1	36	128:207	40
13.	(Latvia) DHK Latgale	52	8	1	1	6	0	36	109:201	34
14.	(Belarus) HK Brest	52	8	0	2	3	2	37	106:203	33

== Playoffs ==
Quarterfinals

- HK Yunost Minsk - Khimik-SKA Novopolotsk 3-0 on series
- HK Khimvolokno Mogilev - HK Vitebsk 3-1 on series
- HK Gomel - HK Neman Grodno 3-2 on series
- Metallurg Zhlobin - HK Keramin Minsk 3-1 on series

Semifinals

- HK Yunost Minsk - HK Khimvolokno Mogilev 3-2 on series
- HK Gomel - Metallurg Zhlobin 3-0 on series

Final

- HK Yunost Minsk - HK Gomel 4-3 on series
