= 2017–18 Belarusian Extraliga season =

Ice hockey season

2017–18 Extraliga
- League: Extraliga
- Sport: Ice hockey
- Duration: September 2017 – April 2018
- Teams: 12

Regular season
- Best record: Neman Grodno
- Runners-up: Yunost Minsk

Playoffs

Finals
- Champions: Neman Grodno
- Runners-up: Yunost Minsk

Belarusian Extraliga seasons
- ← 2016–17 2018–19 →

The 2017–18 Belarusian Extraliga season was the 26th season of the Belarusian Extraliga, the top level of ice hockey in Belarus. Twelve teams participated in the league, and Neman Grodno won the championship.

== First round ==
Pos	Team	Pld	W	OTW	OTL	L	GF	GA	GD	Pts	Final Result
1	Shakhtyor Soligorsk	22	18	2	1	1	89	36	+53	59	Advance to Second Round Group A
2	Yunost Minsk	22	17	3	1	1	124	41	+83	58	Advance to Second Round Group A
3	Neman Grodno	22	15	2	3	2	89	41	+48	52	Advance to Second Round Group A
4	HK Gomel	22	15	1	1	5	76	33	+43	48	Advance to Second Round Group A
5	Dinamo-Molodechno	22	10	1	2	9	80	54	+26	34	Advance to Second Round Group A
6	Metallurg Zhlobin	22	10	1	1	10	66	69	−3	33	Advance to Second Round Group A
7	Belarus U20	22	9	1	3	9	72	71	+1	32	Advance to Second Round Group B
8	HK Lida	22	6	4	2	10	63	78	−15	28	Advance to Second Round Group B
9	Khimik-SKA Novopolotsk	22	6	0	3	13	48	80	−32	21	Advance to Second Round Group B
10	HK Mogilev	22	5	0	0	17	52	114	−62	15	Advance to Second Round Group B
11	HK Vitebsk	22	4	0	0	18	44	119	−75	12	Advance to Second Round Group B
12	HK Brest	22	0	2	0	20	33	100	−67	4	Advance to Second Round Group B

Source: sportstats.com

== Second round ==
=== Group A ===
Pos	Team	Pld	W	OTW	OTL	L	GF	GA	GD	Pts	Final Result
1	Neman Grodno	42	29	3	7	3	148	80	+68	100	Advance to Playoffs
2	Yunost Minsk	42	25	7	2	8	190	92	+98	91	Advance to Playoffs
3	Shakhtyor Soligorsk	42	24	6	3	9	140	89	+51	87	Advance to Playoffs
4	HK Gomel	42	27	1	2	12	120	68	+52	85	Advance to Playoffs
5	Dinamo-Molodechno	42	15	3	3	21	129	115	+14	54	Advance to Playoffs
6	Metallurg Zhlobin	42	14	1	3	24	103	136	−33	47	Advance to Playoffs

Source: sportstats.com

=== Group B ===
Pos	Team	Pld	W	OTW	OTL	L	GF	GA	GD	Pts	Final Result
1	HK Lida	42	18	6	4	14	134	121	+13	70	Advance to Playoffs
2	Khimik-SKA Novopolotsk	42	18	0	6	18	115	135	−20	60	Advance to Playoffs
3	Belarus U20	42	16	3	3	20	128	121	+7	57	
4	HK Mogilev	42	14	1	0	27	120	182	−62	44	
5	HK Vitebsk	42	10	1	0	31	80	187	−107	32	
6	HK Brest	42	7	3	2	30	78	159	−81	29	

Source: sportstats.com

== Playoffs ==
Quarterfinals
1	Neman Grodno	4
8	Khimik-SKA Novopolotsk	0
4	HK Gomel	1
5	Dinamo-Molodechno	4
2	Yunost Minsk	4
7	HK Lida	0
3	Shakhtyor Soligorsk	4
6	Metallurg Zhlobin	0

Semifinals
1	Neman Grodno	4
5	Dinamo-Molodechno	2
2	Yunost Minsk	4
3	Shakhtyor Soligorsk	1

Final
1	Neman Grodno	4
2	Yunost Minsk	2
