= Yevgeni Dadonov (ice hockey, born 1992) =

Belarusian ice hockey player

- Born: August 7, 1992 (age 33) Vitebsk, Belarus
- Height: 6 ft 1 in (185 cm)
- Weight: 205 lb (93 kg; 14 st 9 lb)
- Position: Left wing
- Shoots: Left
- BXL team Former teams: HK Neman Grodno; HC Dinamo Minsk
- National team: Belarus
- NHL draft: Undrafted
- Playing career: 2013–present

Yevgeni Dadonov (born August 7, 1992) is a Belarusian ice hockey winger playing with HK Neman Grodno of the Belarusian Extraleague (BXL).

== Career ==
Dadonov made his Kontinental Hockey League (KHL) debut playing with HC Dinamo Minsk during the 2013–14 KHL season. He has also spent multiple seasons with HC Shakhtyor Soligorsk of the BXL.
