= 2009–10 Belarusian Extraliga season =

Ice hockey season

2009–10 Extraliga
- League: Extraliga
- Sport: Ice hockey
- Teams: 14

Regular season
- Best record: Yunost Minsk
- Runners-up: Shakhtyor Soligorsk

Playoffs

Finals
- Champions: Yunost Minsk
- Runners-up: Shakhtyor Soligorsk

Belarusian Extraliga seasons
- ← 2008–09 2010–11 →

The 2009–10 Belarusian Extraliga season was the 18th season of the Belarusian Extraliga, the top level of ice hockey in Belarus. 14 teams participated in the league, and Yunost Minsk won the championship.

== Regular season ==
	Club	GP	W	OTW	SOW	SOL	OTL	L	GF–GA	Pts
1.	(Belarus) Yunost Minsk	52	40	1	2	3	0	6	205:85	129
2.	(Belarus) HK Shakhtor Soligorsk	52	34	2	2	2	0	12	185:114	112
3.	(Belarus) HK Gomel	52	31	0	5	4	0	12	183:110	107
4.	(Ukraine) HK Sokil Kyiv	52	31	0	5	2	2	12	169:116	107
5.	(Belarus) HK Khimvolokno Mogilev	52	28	0	2	2	2	18	143:132	92
6.	(Belarus) HK Keramin Minsk	52	24	2	4	2	0	20	157:140	86
7.	(Belarus) HK Neman Grodno	52	23	2	4	4	1	18	175:163	86
8.	(Belarus) HK Vitebsk	52	20	1	6	2	0	23	116:120	76
9.	(Belarus) Metallurg Zhlobin	52	18	1	6	4	2	21	133:134	74
10.	(Latvia) HK Liepājas Metalurgs	52	16	0	5	3	0	28	126:166	61
11.	(Latvia) Dinamo Riga II	52	13	0	2	4	2	31	134:203	49
12.	(Belarus) HK Brest	52	10	2	3	6	2	29	115:179	48
13.	(Belarus) Shinnik Bobruisk	52	9	0	2	3	1	37	116:203	35
14.	(Belarus) Khimik-SKA Novopolotsk	52	7	1	0	7	0	37	103:195	30

== Playoffs ==
Quarterfinals

- Yunost Minsk - HK Vitebsk 3–0 on series
- HK Sokil Kiev - HK Khimvolokno Mogilev 3–2 on series
- HK Shakhtor Soligorsk - HK Neman Grodno 3–0 on series
- HK Gomel - HK Keramin Minsk 3–0 on series

Semifinals

- Yunost Minsk - HK Sokil Kiev 3–0 on series
- HK Shakhtor Soligorsk - HK Gomel 3–1 on series

Final

- Yunost Minsk - HK Shakhtor Soligorsk 4–3 on series
