= 2016–17 Belarusian Extraliga season =

Ice hockey season

2016–17 Extraliga
- League: Extraliga
- Sport: Ice hockey
- Duration: September 2016 – April 2017
- Teams: 12

Regular season
- Best record: Yunost Minsk
- Runners-up: Neman Grodno

Playoffs

Finals
- Champions: Neman Grodno
- Runners-up: Yunost Minsk

Belarusian Extraliga seasons
- ← 2015–16 2017–18 →

The 2016–17 Belarusian Extraliga season was the 25th season of the Belarusian Extraliga, the top level of ice hockey in Belarus. Twelve teams participated in the league, and Neman Grodno won the championship.

== Teams ==
Team	City	Arena	Capacity
HK Brest	Brest	Brest Ice Palace	2,000
HK Vitebsk	Vitebsk	Vitebsk Ice Palace	1,900
HK Gomel	Gomel	Gomel Ice Palace	2,760
HK Lida	Lida	Lida Ice Hall	1,000
Metallurg Zhlobin	Zhlobin	Metallurg Ice Palace	2,018
HK Mogilev	Mogilev	Mogilev Ice Palace	3,048
Neman Grodno	Grodno	Hrodna Ice Sports Palace	2,487
Khimik-SKA Novopolotsk	Novopolotsk	Sport and Culture Palace	1,200
Shakhtyor Soligorsk	Soligorsk	Soligorsk Ice Palace	1,759
Yunost Minsk	Minsk	Chizhovka-Arena	8,807
Dinamo-Molodechno	Maladzyechna	Sport-entertainment center	2,200
Belarus U20	Minsk	Chizhovka-Arena	473

== First round ==
Pos	Team	Pld	W	OTW	OTL	L	GF	GA	GD	Pts	Final Result
1	Yunost Minsk	22	18	1	0	3	133	40	+93	56	Advance to Second Round Group A
2	Neman Grodno	22	17	2	1	2	125	36	+89	56	Advance to Second Round Group A
3	Shakhtyor Soligorsk	22	17	1	1	3	109	40	+69	54	Advance to Second Round Group A
4	Dinamo-Molodechno	22	15	1	1	5	73	44	+29	48	Advance to Second Round Group A
5	HK Gomel	22	14	1	3	4	90	42	+48	47	Advance to Second Round Group A
6	Metallurg Zhlobin	22	11	0	0	11	67	60	+7	33	Advance to Second Round Group A
7	HK Lida	22	9	1	0	12	57	62	−5	29	Advance to Second Round Group B
8	Belarus U20	22	8	1	2	11	66	64	+2	28	Advance to Second Round Group B
9	HK Vitebsk	22	5	1	0	16	48	109	−61	17	Advance to Second Round Group B
10	HK Mogilev	22	4	0	0	18	48	132	−84	12	Advance to Second Round Group B
11	Khimik-SKA Novopolotsk	22	2	1	3	16	32	114	−82	11	Advance to Second Round Group B
12	HK Brest	22	1	1	0	20	25	130	−105	5	Advance to Second Round Group B

Source: sportstats.com

== Second round ==
=== Group A ===
Pos	Team	Pld	W	OTW	OTL	L	GF	GA	GD	Pts	Final Result
1	Yunost Minsk	42	30	3	4	5	214	85	+129	100	Advance to Playoffs
2	Neman Grodno	42	29	3	2	8	185	70	+115	95	Advance to Playoffs
3	HK Gomel	42	23	5	3	11	144	80	+64	82	Advance to Playoffs
4	Shakhtyor Soligorsk	42	22	2	3	15	145	92	+53	73	Advance to Playoffs
5	Dinamo-Molodechno	42	21	2	3	16	123	109	+14	70	Advance to Playoffs
6	Metallurg Zhlobin	42	17	1	1	23	97	137	−40	54	Advance to Playoffs

Source: sportstats.com

=== Group B ===
Pos	Team	Pld	W	OTW	OTL	L	GF	GA	GD	Pts	Final Result
1	HK Lida	42	24	4	0	14	151	93	+58	80	Advance to Playoffs
2	Belarus U20	42	20	2	3	17	135	107	+28	67	Advance to Playoffs
3	Khimik-SKA Novopolotsk	42	11	1	6	24	80	172	−92	41	
4	HK Mogilev	42	13	0	1	28	110	214	−104	40	
5	HK Vitebsk	42	8	2	1	31	93	192	−99	29	
6	HK Brest	42	5	4	2	31	71	197	−126	25	

Source: sportstats.com

== Playoffs ==
Quarterfinals
1	Yunost Minsk	4
8	Belarus U20	0
4	Shakhtyor Soligorsk	4
5	Dinamo-Molodechno	1
2	Neman Grodno	4
7	HK Lida	0
3	HK Gomel	4
6	Metallurg Zhlobin	0

Semifinals
1	Yunost Minsk	4
4	Shakhtyor Soligorsk	1
2	Neman Grodno	4
3	HK Gomel	0

Final
1	Yunost Minsk	0
2	Neman Grodno	4
