= 2013–14 Belarusian Extraliga season =

Ice hockey season

2013–14 Extraliga
- League: Extraliga
- Sport: Ice hockey
- Teams: 10

Regular season
- Best record: Neman Grodno
- Runners-up: Yunost Minsk

Playoffs

Finals
- Champions: Neman Grodno
- Runners-up: Yunost Minsk

Belarusian Extraliga seasons
- ← 2012–13 2014–15 →

The 2013–14 Belarusian Extraliga season was the 22nd season of the Belarusian Extraliga, the top level of ice hockey in Belarus. Ten teams participated in the league this season: Neman Grodno, Yunost Minsk, Shakhtar Soligorsk, HK Gomel, Metallurg Zhlobin, Khimik-SKA Novopolotsk, HK Lida, HK Brest, HK Vitebsk, and HK Mogilev.

== First round ==
	Club	GP	W	OTW	SOW	OTL	SOL	L	Goals	Pts
1.	(Belarus) Yunost Minsk	36	27	3	1	1	1	3	147:61	91
2.	(Belarus) HC Neman Grodno	36	28	2	0	1	1	4	149:55	90
3.	(Belarus) Metallurg Zhlobin	36	20	1	2	2	1	10	122:69	69
4.	(Belarus) HK Gomel	36	20	1	1	0	2	12	139:81	66
5.	(Belarus) Khimik-SKA Novopolotsk	36	20	0	0	1	0	15	109:105	61
6.	(Belarus) Shakhtar Soligorsk	36	19	1	0	1	0	15	85:75	60
7.	(Belarus) HK Lida	36	11	0	2	1	0	22	91:136	38
8.	(Belarus) HK Brest	36	10	1	1	0	0	24	77:125	34
9.	(Belarus) HK Vitebsk	36	6	0	0	0	1	29	66:147	19
10.	(Belarus) HK Mogilev	36	3	0	0	2	1	30	39:170	12

== Second round ==
=== Group A ===
	Club	GP	W	OTW	SOW	OTL	SOL	L	Goals	Pts
1.	(Belarus) HC Neman Grodno	52	38	2	1	2	3	6	200:91	125
2.	(Belarus) Yunost Minsk	52	34	3	3	2	1	9	197:106	117
3.	(Belarus) HK Gomel	52	27	1	5	0	2	17	180:111	95
4.	(Belarus) Metallurg Zhlobin	52	24	3	2	3	5	15	166:112	90
5.	(Belarus) Khimik-SKA Novopolotsk	52	22	1	0	1	1	27	140:168	70

=== Group B ===
	Club	GP	W	OTW	SOW	OTL	SOL	L	Goals	Pts
6.	(Belarus) Shakhtar Soligorsk	52	30	2	0	2	0	18	137:97	96
7.	(Belarus) HK Lida	52	18	0	2	3	1	28	153:191	62
8.	(Belarus) HK Brest	52	16	4	2	0	0	30	117:165	60
9.	(Belarus) HK Vitebsk	52	9	3	1	1	2	36	105:197	38
10.	(Belarus) HK Mogilev	52	7	0	0	5	1	39	75:232	27

== Playoffs ==
Quarterfinals
1	(Belarus) Neman Grodno	3
8	(Belarus) HK Brest	1
4	(Belarus) Metallurg Zhlobin	3
5	(Belarus) Khimik-SKA Novopolotsk	0
2	(Belarus) Yunost Minsk	3
7	(Belarus) HK Lida	0
3	(Belarus) HK Gomel	3
6	(Belarus) Shakhtar Soligorsk	1

Semifinals
1	(Belarus) Neman Grodno	4
4	(Belarus) Metallurg Zhlobin	0
2	(Belarus) Yunost Minsk	4
3	(Belarus) HK Gomel	2

Final
1	(Belarus) Neman Grodno	4
2	(Belarus) Yunost Minsk	2
