= 2014–15 Belarusian Extraliga season =

Ice hockey season

2014–15 Extraliga
- League: Extraliga
- Sport: Ice hockey
- Duration: September 2014 – March 2015
- Teams: 11

Regular season
- Best record: Shakhtyor Soligorsk
- Runners-up: HK Gomel

Playoffs

Finals
- Champions: Shakhtyor Soligorsk
- Runners-up: Yunost Minsk

Belarusian Extraliga seasons
- ← 2013–14 2015–16 →

The 2014–15 Belarusian Extraliga season was the 23rd season of the Belarusian Extraliga, the top level of ice hockey in Belarus. Eleven teams participated in the league this season. HC Shakhtyor Soligorsk won both the regular season and the playoffs.

== First round ==
Pos	Team	Pld	W	OTW	OTL	L	GF	GA	GD	Pts	Final Result
1	Shakhtyor Soligorsk	40	28	6	2	4	172	65	+107	98	Advance to second round group A
2	HK Gomel	40	27	2	6	5	158	69	+89	91	Advance to second round group A
3	Yunost Minsk	40	26	1	4	9	163	81	+82	84	Advance to second round group A
4	Metallurg Zhlobin	40	20	7	4	9	133	84	+49	78	Advance to second round group A
5	Neman Grodno	40	19	6	5	10	126	88	+38	74	Advance to second round group A
6	Dinamo-Molodechno	40	13	9	5	13	115	107	+8	62	Advance to second round group A
7	Khimik-SKA Novopolotsk	40	9	7	4	20	103	131	−28	45	Advance to second round group B
8	HK Vitebsk	40	9	5	7	19	99	138	−39	44	Advance to second round group B
9	HK Brest	40	6	4	5	25	72	166	−94	31	Advance to second round group B
10	HK Lida	40	7	1	5	27	86	157	−71	28	Advance to second round group B
11	HK Mogilev	40	6	2	3	29	74	215	−141	25	Advance to second round group B

Source: scoresway.com

== Second round ==
=== Group A ===
Pos	Team	Pld	W	OTW	OTL	L	GF	GA	GD	Pts	Final Result
1	Shakhtyor Soligorsk	55	35	8	2	10	204	94	+110	123	Advance to Playoffs
2	HK Gomel	55	35	3	8	9	208	102	+106	119	Advance to Playoffs
3	Yunost Minsk	55	34	2	6	13	204	123	+81	112	Advance to Playoffs
4	Neman Grodno	55	27	8	6	14	167	122	+45	103	Advance to Playoffs
5	Metallurg Zhlobin	55	22	8	6	19	162	129	+33	88	Advance to Playoffs
6	Dinamo-Molodechno	55	17	10	6	22	150	152	−2	77	Advance to Playoffs

Source: scoresway.com

=== Group B ===
Pos	Team	Pld	W	OTW	OTL	L	GF	GA	GD	Pts	Final Result
1	HK Vitebsk	52	17	5	8	22	155	185	−30	69	Advance to Playoffs
2	Khimik-SKA Novopolotsk	52	16	8	4	24	147	162	−15	68	Advance to Playoffs
3	HK Lida	52	13	3	5	31	132	202	−70	50	
4	HK Brest	52	8	5	7	32	112	218	−106	41	
5	HK Mogilev	52	9	2	4	37	118	270	−152	35	

Source: scoresway.com

== Playoffs ==
Quarterfinals
1	(Belarus) Shakhtyor Soligorsk	3
8	(Belarus) Khimik-SKA Novopolotsk	0
4	(Belarus) Neman Grodno	3
5	(Belarus) Metallurg Zhlobin	1
2	(Belarus) HK Gomel	3
7	(Belarus) HK Vitebsk	0
3	(Belarus) Yunost Minsk	3
6	(Belarus) Dinamo-Molodechno	1

Semifinals
1	(Belarus) Shakhtyor Soligorsk	4
4	(Belarus) Neman Grodno	1
2	(Belarus) HK Gomel	0
3	(Belarus) Yunost Minsk	4

Final
1	(Belarus) Shakhtyor Soligorsk	4
3	(Belarus) Yunost Minsk	0
