= 2010–11 Belarusian Extraliga season =

Ice hockey season

2010–11 Extraliga
- League: Extraliga
- Sport: Ice hockey
- Teams: 12

Regular season
- Best record: Yunost Minsk
- Runners-up: Neman Grodno

Playoffs

Finals
- Champions: Yunost Minsk
- Runners-up: Neman Grodno

Belarusian Extraliga seasons
- ← 2009–10 2011–12 →

The 2010–11 Belarusian Extraliga season was the 19th season of the Belarusian Extraliga, the top level of ice hockey in Belarus. 12 teams participated in the league, and Yunost Minsk won the championship.

== Regular season ==
	Club	GP	W	OTW	SOW	SOL	OTL	L	GF–GA	Pts
1.	(Belarus) Yunost Minsk	55	43	1	1	3	0	7	274:123	136
2.	(Belarus) HK Neman Grodno	55	40	0	3	2	2	8	214:116	130
3.	(Belarus) Metallurg Zhlobin	55	33	3	4	1	3	11	169:103	117
4.	(Belarus) HK Shakhtor Soligorsk	55	27	4	4	2	1	17	197:143	100
5.	(Belarus) HK Gomel	55	26	1	3	3	1	21	178:160	90
6.	(Latvia) HK Liepājas Metalurgs	55	19	3	7	7	1	18	157:153	85
7.	(Ukraine) HK Sokil Kyiv	55	21	4	2	6	3	19	140:148	84
8.	(Belarus) HK Brest	55	14	2	7	3	2	27	157:205	65
9.	(Belarus) Khimik-SKA Novopolotsk	55	16	1	1	4	3	30	151:217	59
10.	(Belarus) HK Mogilev	55	14	1	1	2	1	36	158:236	49
11.	(Belarus) HK Vitebsk	55	8	2	4	4	4	33	130:203	44
12.	(Belarus) Shinnik Bobruisk	55	5	2	3	3	3	39	109:227	31

== Playoffs ==
Quarterfinals

- Yunost Minsk - HK Brest 3-1 on series.
- HK Shakhtor Soligorsk - HK Gomel 3-2 on series.
- HK Neman Grodno - HK Sokil Kyiv 3-0 in series.
- Metallurg Zhlobin - HK Liepājas Metalurgs 3-0 on series.

Semifinals

- Yunost Minsk - HK Shakhtor Soligorsk 3-0 on series.
- HK Neman Grodno - Metallurg Zhlobin 3-0 on series.

Final

- Yunost Minsk - HK Neman Grodno 4-2 on series.
