= 2006–07 Belarusian Extraliga season =

Ice hockey season

2006–07 Extraliga
- League: Extraliga
- Sport: Ice hockey
- Teams: 11

Regular season
- Best record: HK Keramin Minsk
- Runners-up: HC Dinamo Minsk

Playoffs

Finals
- Champions: HC Dinamo Minsk
- Runners-up: HK Keramin Minsk

Belarusian Extraliga seasons
- ← 2005–06 2007–08 →

The 2006–07 Belarusian Extraliga season was the 15th season of the Belarusian Extraliga, the top level of ice hockey in Belarus. 11 teams participated in the league, and HC Dinamo Minsk won the championship.

== Regular season ==
	Club	G	W	OTW	T	OTL	L	GF:GA	Pts
1.	(Belarus) HK Keramin Minsk	50	34	0	5	3	8	177:107	110
2.	(Belarus) HC Dinamo Minsk	50	32	3	6	0	9	176:92	108
3.	(Belarus) HK Yunost Minsk	50	31	2	4	3	10	175:115	104
4.	(Belarus) HK Khimvolokno Mogilev	50	23	4	8	1	14	163:131	86
5.	(Belarus) Khimik-SKA Novopolotsk	50	23	1	4	3	19	153:143	78
6.	(Belarus) HK Gomel	50	21	3	5	2	19	165:126	76
7.	(Belarus) HK Neman Grodno	50	18	2	6	2	22	125:128	66
8.	(Belarus) Metallurg Zhlobin	50	17	0	9	2	22	115:152	62
9.	(Belarus) HK Vitebsk	50	16	3	6	0	25	136:164	60
10.	(Ukraine) HK Sokil Kyiv	50	9	0	5	2	34	94:203	34
11.	(Belarus) HK Brest	50	3	0	2	0	45	80:198	11

== Playoffs ==
Quarterfinals

- HK Keramin Minsk - Metallurg Zhlobin 3-1 on series
- Khimik-SKA Novopolotsk - HK Khimvolokno Mogilev 3-1 on series
- HC Dinamo Minsk - HK Neman Grodno 3-0 on series
- HK Yunost Minsk - HK Gomel 3-2 on series

Semifinals

- HK Keramin Minsk - Khimik-SKA Novopolotsk 3-0 on series
- HC Dinamo Minsk - HK Yunost Minsk 3-1 on series

Final

- HC Dinamo Minsk - HK Keramin Minsk 4-1 on series
