= Maxim Rasseikin =

Russian ice hockey player

- Born: 26 April 1998 (age 27) Yekaterinburg, Russia
- Height: 187 cm (6 ft 2 in)
- Weight: 83 kg (183 lb; 13 st 1 lb)
- Position: Forward
- Shoots: Left
- KHL team Former teams: Avtomobilist Yekaterinburg; Yunost Minsk
- NHL draft: Undrafted
- Playing career: 2015–present

Maxim Rasseikin (born 26 April 1998) is a Russian professional ice hockey forward currently playing with Avtomobilist Yekaterinburg of the Kontinental Hockey League (KHL).

He signed as free agent to a one-year contract with Yunost Minsk of the Belarusian Extraleague (BLR) on 10 May 2020. He returned to Avtomobilist in the following off-season, agreeing to a two-year contract on 12 May 2021.
