= 2015–16 Belarusian Extraliga season =

Ice hockey season

2015–16 Extraliga
- League: Extraliga
- Sport: Ice hockey
- Duration: September 2015 – April 2016
- Teams: 12

Regular season
- Best record: Yunost Minsk
- Runners-up: Shakhtyor Soligorsk

Playoffs

Finals
- Champions: Yunost Minsk
- Runners-up: Shakhtyor Soligorsk

Belarusian Extraliga seasons
- ← 2014–15 2016–17 →

The 2015–16 Belarusian Extraliga season was the 24th season of the Belarusian Extraliga, the top level of ice hockey in Belarus. Twelve teams participated in the league this season. Yunost Minsk won both the regular season and the playoffs.

== First round ==
Pos	Team	Pld	W	OTW	OTL	L	GF	GA	GD	Pts	Final Result
1	Yunost Minsk	22	17	2	0	3	99	44	+55	55	Advance to Second Round Group A
2	Shakhtyor Soligorsk	22	17	1	1	3	78	35	+43	54	Advance to Second Round Group A
3	HK Gomel	22	14	2	2	4	86	35	+51	48	Advance to Second Round Group A
4	Neman Grodno	22	15	1	1	5	72	37	+35	48	Advance to Second Round Group A
5	Dinamo-Molodechno	22	14	1	2	5	72	54	+18	46	Advance to Second Round Group A
6	Metallurg Zhlobin	22	10	2	3	7	62	40	+22	37	Advance to Second Round Group A
7	HK Lida	22	8	1	0	13	66	83	−17	26	Advance to Second Round Group B
8	Khimik-SKA Novopolotsk	22	4	5	1	12	40	53	−13	23	Advance to Second Round Group B
9	HK Brest	22	5	2	2	13	37	73	−36	21	Advance to Second Round Group B
10	Dinamo U20 Babruysk	22	4	0	1	17	49	86	−37	13	Advance to Second Round Group B
11	HK Vitebsk	22	3	1	2	16	45	92	−47	13	Advance to Second Round Group B
12	HK Mogilev	22	2	1	4	15	42	116	−74	12	Advance to Second Round Group B

Source: sportstats.com

== Second round ==
=== Group A ===
Pos	Team	Pld	W	OTW	OTL	L	GF	GA	GD	Pts	Final Result
1	Yunost Minsk	42	29	3	2	8	160	87	+73	95	Advance to Playoffs
2	Shakhtyor Soligorsk	42	29	2	2	9	130	76	+54	93	Advance to Playoffs
3	HK Gomel	42	26	3	2	11	134	68	+66	86	Advance to Playoffs
4	Neman Grodno	42	24	2	1	15	127	91	+36	77	Advance to Playoffs
5	Dinamo-Molodechno	42	17	2	4	19	111	124	−13	59	Advance to Playoffs
6	Metallurg Zhlobin	42	15	4	5	18	103	95	+8	58	Advance to Playoffs

Source: sportstats.com

=== Group B ===
Pos	Team	Pld	W	OTW	OTL	L	GF	GA	GD	Pts	Final Result
1	HK Lida	42	18	3	4	17	153	149	+4	64	Advance to Playoffs
2	Khimik-SKA Novopolotsk	42	12	11	4	15	116	109	+7	62	Advance to Playoffs
3	HK Brest	42	9	7	3	23	92	143	−51	44	
4	HK Mogilev	42	10	3	5	24	96	185	−89	41	
5	HK Vitebsk	42	8	4	8	22	127	174	−47	40	
6	Dinamo U20 Babruysk	42	9	2	6	25	107	155	−48	37	

Source: sportstats.com

== Playoffs ==
Quarterfinals
1	(Belarus) Yunost Minsk	4
8	(Belarus) Khimik-SKA Novopolotsk	0
4	(Belarus) Neman Grodno	4
5	(Belarus) Dinamo-Molodechno	3
2	(Belarus) Shakhtyor Soligorsk	4
7	(Belarus) HK Lida	0
3	(Belarus) HK Gomel	4
6	(Belarus) Metallurg Zhlobin	2

Semifinals
1	(Belarus) Yunost Minsk	4
4	(Belarus) Neman Grodno	1
2	(Belarus) Shakhtyor Soligorsk	4
3	(Belarus) HK Gomel	2

Final
1	(Belarus) Yunost Minsk	4
2	(Belarus) Shakhtyor Soligorsk	1
