= Vladislav Boiko =

Russian ice hockey forward

- Born: 15 December 1995 (age 29) Moscow, Russia
- Height: 6 ft 4 in (193 cm)
- Weight: 190 lb (86 kg; 13 st 8 lb)
- Position: Forward
- Shoots: Left
- BHL team Former teams: HC Shakhtyor Soligorsk; HC Dynamo Pardubice; Admiral Vladivostok
- Playing career: 2015–present

Vladislav Yevgenevich Boiko (Russian: Владислав Евгеньевич Бойко; born 15 December 1995) is a Russian professional ice hockey forward who currently plays for HC Shakhtyor Soligorsk in the Belarusian Extraleague.

Boiko previously played one season for HC Dynamo Pardubice of the Czech Extraliga during the 2017–18 season, playing 41 games and scoring two goals and three assists. He also played one game in the Kontinental Hockey League for Admiral Vladivostok during the 2018–19 season.
