= 2012–13 Belarusian Extraliga season =

Ice hockey season

2012–13 Extraliga
- League: Extraliga
- Sport: Ice hockey
- Teams: 11

Regular season
- Best record: Metallurg Zhlobin
- Runners-up: HK Gomel

Playoffs

Finals
- Champions: Neman Grodno
- Runners-up: Metallurg Zhlobin

Belarusian Extraliga seasons
- ← 2011–12 2013–14 →

The 2012–13 Belarusian Extraliga season was the 21st season of the Belarusian Extraliga, the top level of ice hockey in Belarus. 11 teams participated in the league, and HK Neman Grodno won the championship.

== First round ==
	Club	GP	W	OTW	OTL	L	Goals	Pts
1.	(Belarus) Metallurg Zhlobin	40	33	2	1	4	173:49	104
2.	(Belarus) HK Gomel	40	30	3	2	5	208:70	98
3.	(Belarus) HK Neman Grodno	40	30	3	1	6	186:78	97
4.	(Belarus) Shakhtar Soligorsk	40	23	1	3	13	143:108	74
5.	(Latvia) HK Liepājas Metalurgs	40	21	3	2	14	133:103	71
6.	(Belarus) HK Lida	40	17	1	4	18	107:131	57
7.	(Belarus) Junior Minsk	40	14	4	2	20	82:114	52
8.	(Belarus) Khimik-SKA Novopolotsk	40	9	5	0	26	97:161	37
9.	(Belarus) HK Brest	40	8	1	1	30	100:195	27
10.	(Belarus) HK Vitebsk	40	6	0	4	30	90:213	22
11.	(Belarus) HK Mogilev	40	6	0	3	31	62:159	21

== Second round ==
=== Group A ===
	Club	GP	W	OTW	OTL	L	Goals	Pts
1.	(Belarus) Metallurg Zhlobin	50	41	2	2	5	209:63	129
2.	(Belarus) HK Gomel	50	34	6	2	8	240:93	116
3.	(Belarus) HK Neman Grodno	50	33	3	4	10	215:114	109
4.	(Belarus) Shakhtar Soligorsk	50	28	2	4	16	176:136	92
5.	(Latvia) HK Liepājas Metalurgs	50	22	5	2	21	157:141	78
6.	(Belarus) HK Lida	50	20	1	5	24	128:167	67

=== Group B ===
	Club	GP	W	OTW	OTL	L	Goals	Pts
7.	(Belarus) Junior Minsk	48	20	4	3	21	131:138	71
8.	(Belarus) Khimik-SKA Novopolotsk	48	15	6	0	27	137:182	57
9.	(Belarus) HK Brest	48	10	2	1	35	120:220	35
10.	(Belarus) HK Vitebsk	48	9	0	4	35	110:252	31
11.	(Belarus) HK Mogilev	48	7	0	4	37	83:200	25

== Playoffs ==
Quarterfinals
1	(Belarus) Metallurg Zhlobin	3
8	(Belarus) Khimik-SKA Novopolotsk	0
2	(Belarus) HK Gomel	2
7	(Belarus) Junior Minsk	3
3	(Belarus) HK Neman Grodno	3
6	(Belarus) HK Lida	0
4	(Belarus) Shakhtar Soligorsk	3
5	(Latvia) HK Liepājas Metalurgs	0

Semifinals
1	(Belarus) Metallurg Zhlobin	4
7	(Belarus) Junior Minsk	0
3	(Belarus) HK Neman Grodno	4
4	(Belarus) Shakhtar Soligorsk	1

Final
1	(Belarus) Metallurg Zhlobin	0
3	(Belarus) HK Neman Grodno	4
