= Neman Grodno =

Neman Grodno may refer to:

- FC Neman Grodno, a Belarusian football club
- HC Neman Grodno, a Belarusian ice hockey club
