= Shakhtsyor Salihorsk =

Shaktyor Salihorsk or Shakhtyor Soligorsk may refer to:

- FC Shakhtyor Soligorsk, a Belarusian Premier League football club
- HC Shakhtyor Soligorsk, an ice hockey club in Soligorsk, Belarus
