= 2011–12 Belarusian Extraliga season =

Ice hockey season

2011–12 Extraliga
- League: Extraliga
- Sport: Ice hockey
- Teams: 11

Regular season
- Best record: Metallurg Zhlobin
- Runners-up: Neman Grodno

Playoffs

Finals
- Champions: Metallurg Zhlobin
- Runners-up: Neman Grodno

Belarusian Extraliga seasons
- ← 2010–11 2012–13 →

The 2011–12 Belarusian Extraliga season was the 20th season of the Belarusian Extraliga, the top level of ice hockey in Belarus. 11 teams participated in the league, and Metallurg Zhlobin won the championship.

== Regular season ==
	Club	GP	W	OTW	OTL	L	Goals	Pts
1.	(Belarus) Metallurg Zhlobin	50	41	2	2	5	194:70	129
2.	(Belarus) HK Neman Grodno	50	37	2	2	9	216:95	117
3.	(Belarus) HK Gomel	50	34	3	7	6	216:96	115
4.	(Belarus) Shakhtar Soligorsk	50	26	6	4	14	189:118	94
5.	(Belarus) Yunost Minsk	50	25	7	5	13	155:177	94
6.	(Belarus) HK Lida	50	18	1	5	26	149:178	61
7.	(Latvia) HK Liepājas Metalurgs	50	11	7	4	28	133:174	51
8.	(Belarus) HK Mogilev	50	13	3	2	32	121:220	47
9.	(Belarus) Khimik-SKA Novopolotsk	50	12	2	1	35	133:234	41
10.	(Belarus) HK Vitebsk	50	10	2	5	33	137:240	39
11.	(Belarus) HK Brest	50	10	3	1	36	112:213	37

== Playoffs ==
Quarterfinals
1	(Belarus) Metallurg Zhlobin	3
8	(Belarus) HK Mogilev	0
4	(Belarus) Shakhtar Soligorsk	3
5	(Belarus) Yunost Minsk	2
2	(Belarus) HK Neman Grodno	3
7	(Latvia) HK Liepājas Metalurgs	1
3	(Belarus) HK Gomel	3
6	(Belarus) HK Lida	0

Semifinals
1	(Belarus) Metallurg Zhlobin	3
4	(Belarus) Shakhtar Soligorsk	2
2	(Belarus) HK Neman Grodno	3
3	(Belarus) HK Gomel	2

Final
1	(Belarus) Metallurg Zhlobin	4
2	(Belarus) HK Neman Grodno	2
