= 2007–08 Belarusian Extraliga season =

Ice hockey season

2007–08 Extraliga
- League: Extraliga
- Sport: Ice hockey
- Teams: 10

Regular season
- Best record: HK Keramin Minsk
- Runners-up: HK Yunost Minsk

Playoffs

Finals
- Champions: HK Keramin Minsk
- Runners-up: HK Yunost Minsk

Belarusian Extraliga seasons
- ← 2006–07 2008–09 →

The 2007–08 Belarusian Extraliga season was the 16th season of the Belarusian Extraliga, the top level of ice hockey in Belarus. 10 teams participated in the league, and HK Keramin Minsk won the championship.

== Regular season ==
	Club	G	W	OTW	OTL	L	GF:GA	Pts
1.	HK Keramin Minsk	54	35	7	2	10	204:117	121
2.	HK Yunost Minsk	54	27	10	4	13	164:114	105
3.	HC Dinamo Minsk	54	27	4	7	16	138:115	96
4.	HK Vitebsk	54	26	4	3	21	144:128	89
5.	Metallurg Zhlobin	54	22	9	2	21	151:132	86
6.	HK Khimvolokno Mogilev	54	21	3	7	23	138:125	76
7.	Khimik-SKA Novopolotsk	54	17	5	11	21	152:162	72
8.	HK Neman Grodno	54	16	6	8	24	107:148	68
9.	HK Gomel	54	19	3	4	28	142:176	67
10.	HK Brest	54	8	1	4	41	85:208	30

== Playoffs ==
Quarterfinals

- HK Keramin Minsk - HK Neman Grodno 3-0 on series
- HK Vitebsk - Metallurg Zhlobin 3-2 on series
- HK Yunost Minsk - Khimik SKA-Novopolotsk 3-1 on series
- HC Dinamo Minsk - HK Khimvolokno Mogilev 3-2 on series

Semifinals

- HK Keramin Minsk - HK Vitebsk 3-0 on series
- HK Yunost Minsk - HC Dinamo Minsk 3-0 on series

Final

- HK Keramin Minsk - HK Yunost Minsk 4-0 on series
