= HK Lida =

- City: Lida, Belarus
- League: Belarusian Extraleague; 2011-Present; Belarusian Cup; 2011-Present
- Founded: 2011
- Operated: 2011–present
- Home arena: Sport Palace Lida
- Colours
- Head coach: Dmitri Dudik
- Captain: Dmitri Ovsyannikov
- Website: lida.hockey.by

HK Lida (Belar. ХК Лiда) is a Belarusian ice hockey team that plays in the Belarusian Extraleague. They play their home games at the Sport Palace Lida, in Lida.

== History ==
HK Lida were founded in 2011 and joined the Belarusian Extraleague for the start of the 2011–12 season. The team base themselves at the Sport Palace Lida; built in 2010, the building has a capacity of 1,000. HK Lida finished the 2011–12 season in sixth place, advancing to the playoffs. In the quarterfinals they lost the best of five game series to HK Gomel 0–3. In 2011 HK Lida also competed in their first Belarusian Cup. Placed in Group II Lida finished in fourth place and failed to progress to the final. At the 2012 Belarusian Cup Lida again finished fourth in Group II and failed to advance.

== Season-by-season results ==
=== Belarusian Extraleague ===
Season	GP	W	OTW	OTL	L	GF	GA	PTS	Finish	Playoff
2011–12	50	18	1	5	26	149	178	61	6th	Lost quarterfinal vs. HK Gomel, 0–3

=== Belarusian Cup ===
Season	GP	W	OTW	OTL	L	GF	GA	PTS	Finish	Final
2011	5	2	1	0	2	15	14	8	4th, Group II	Did not qualify
2012	4	2	0	0	2	14	19	6	4th, Group II	Did not qualify

== Roster ==
Team roster for the 2012–13 Belarusian Extraliga season

#	Nat	Name	Pos	Date of birth	Acquired	Birthplace
1	(Russia)	Alexei Brish	G	19 August 1986	2011	Severodonetsk, Ukrainian SSR, USSR
83	(Belarus)	Sergei Rogovsky	G	4 December 1983	2012	Minsk, Byelorussian SSR, USSR
33	(Belarus)	Arseni Denskevich	D	28 January 1990	2012	Grodno, Byelorussian SSR, USSR
26	(Belarus)	Nikolai Goncharov	D	5 August 1989	2012	Minsk, Byelorussian SSR, USSR
11	(Belarus)	Sergei Kopylets	D	19 September 1988	2011	Grodno, Byelorussian SSR, USSR
28	(Belarus)	Yevgeni Myastovsky	D	19 March 1991	2012	Minsk, Byelorussian SSR, USSR
43	(Belarus)	Alexei Sadovik	D	23 June 1990	2012	Novopolotsk, Byelorussian SSR, USSR
8	(Belarus)	Maxim Trofimov	D	17 October 1990	2011	
4	(Belarus)	Dmitri Yedeshko	D	25 April 1985	2012	Grodno, Byelorussian SSR, USSR
72	(Belarus)	Alexander Zakharenko	D	25 April 1987	2011	Minsk, Byelorussian SSR, USSR
91	(Belarus)	Rustam Azimov	F	26 January 1991	2012	Novopolotsk, Byelorussian SSR, USSR
19	(Belarus)	Valeri Boyarskikh	F	13 March 1990	2012	Minsk, Byelorussian SSR, USSR
63	(Belarus)	Dmitri Khilko	F	9 October 1989	2011	Grodno, Byelorussian SSR, USSR
37	(Belarus)	Denis Kirpichenok	F	19 June 1990	2012	Novopolotsk, Byelorussian SSR, USSR
89	(Belarus)	Alexei Kuveko	F	26 December 1989	2011	Minsk, Byelorussian SSR, USSR
82	(Russia)	Denis Lobashov	F	15 November 1988	2012	Almetievsk, Russian SFSR, USSR
47	(Belarus)	Kirill Nikulin	F	21 September 1989	2011	Surgut, Russian SFSR, USSR
13	(Belarus)	Andrei Orlyuk	F	21 January 1985	2012	Grodno, Byelorussian SSR, USSR
23	(Belarus)	Oleg Pugach	F	7 January 1992	2011	Grodno, Belarus
71	(Belarus)	Yuri Seryakov	F	4 May 1992	2012	Minsk, Belarus
61	(Belarus)	Igor Sheremetiev	F	5 May 1991	2012	Novopolotsk, Byelorussian SSR, USSR
17	(Belarus)	Yegor Smolin	F	6 January 1986	2012	Ust-Kamenogorsk, Kazakh SSR, USSR
70	(Belarus)	Dmitri Violenty	F	23 September 1987	2011	Tolyatti, Russian SFSR, USSR
