= HK Mogilev =

- City: Mogilev, Belarus
- League: Belarusian Extraleague
- Founded: 2000
- Operated: 2000
- Home arena: Mogilev Ice Sports Palace
- Head coach: Rylkov
- Affiliates: Dneprovskiye Lvy Mogilev
- Website: mogilev.hockey.by

Franchise history
- 2001–2010: Khimvolokno Mogilev
- 2000–2001, 2010–present: HK Mogilev

Championships
- Regular season titles: 0
- Belarusian Extraleague: 0

HK Mogilev is an ice hockey team in Mogilev, Belarus. The team competes in the Belarusian Extraliga (BXL).

== History ==
HK Mogilev was formed in 2000 and joined the Belarusian Extraleague in for the 2000–01 season. The following season the club changed their name to Khimvolokno Mogilev which they played under from 2001 until 2010. In 2001 Mogilev joined the Eastern European Hockey League Division B league as well as playing in the Belarusian Extraleague. For the 2002–03 season, Mogilev was promoted to the Eastern European Hockey League (EEHL) top league and did not compete in the Extraleague for the season. The club returned to the Extraleague for the 2003–04 season and competed in the final EEHL season before the league folded. Mogilev continued to compete in the Belarusian Extraleague until the end of the 2012–13 season.

In July 2013, it was announced that the club had declared bankruptcy and would cease to exist. The club also announced that HK Mogilev-2 would continue to compete in the Vysshaya Liga. Later in July, Vladimir Podrebinkin – head of the Mogilev Regional Hockey Federation – announced that the club would continue playing in the Belarusian Extraleague for the 2013–14 season.

== Current roster ==
Goaltenders
Number		Player	Date of birth	Glove	Place of birth
1	(Belarus)	Nikita Kitayev	1992-11-26	L	Mogilev, Belarus
20	(Belarus)	Yevgeni Vladimirovich	1995-09-13	L	Mogilev, Belarus
30	(Belarus)	Denis Povarov	1994-05-18	L	Mogilev, Belarus
69	(Belarus)	Igor Petrenko	1994-02-27	L	Minsk, Belarus
Defensemen
Number		Player	Date of birth	Shoots	Place of birth
10	(Belarus)	Denis Malishevsky	1995-05-27	L	Mogilev, Belarus
15	(Belarus)	Alexander Kudryavtsev	1992-06-05	R	Mogilev, Belarus
18	(Belarus)	Nikita Kozlov	1993-08-09	R	Minsk, Belarus
21	(Belarus)	Yegor Ivanov	1996-06-30	L	Mogilev, Belarus
26	(Belarus)	Artyom Maximov	1993-07-22	L	Minsk, Belarus
28	(Belarus)	Denis Gribko	1990-06-19	L	Minsk, Belarus
32	(Belarus)	Yegor Reut	1994-05-30	L	Minsk, Belarus
33	(Belarus)	Alexander Motuzov	1994-05-20	L	Mogilev, Belarus
44	(Belarus)	Alexei Sadovik	1990-06-23	L	Novopolotsk, Belarus
79	(Belarus)	Pavel Belyai	1994-08-11	R	Mogilev, Belarus
-	(Belarus)	Vladislav Miroshkin	1995-10-01	L	Mogilev, Belarus
Forwards
Number		Player	Date of birth	Shoots	Place of birth
5	(Belarus)	Vladislav Seryakov	1995-09-06	L	Mogilev, Belarus
11	(Belarus)	Pavel Stepanov	1991-06-24	L	Minsk, Belarus
12	(Belarus)	Alexander Krotov	1997-12-30	R	Mogilev, Belarus
13	(Belarus)	Andrei Savchenko	1991-10-26	R	Mogilev, Belarus
14	(Belarus)	Alexander Kobus	1991-04-14	L	Minsk, Belarus
16	(Belarus)	Artyom Vasko	1992-12-09	R	Minsk, Belarus
17	(Belarus)	Alexander Kravtsov	1996-01-30	L	Mogilev, Belarus
19	(Belarus)	Alexander Korotkevich	1988-03-03	L	Minsk, Belarus
23	(Belarus) / (Kazakhstan)	Yegor Smolin	1986-01-06	R	Ust-Kamenogorsk, Kazakhstan
24	(Russia)	Georgi Badalyan	1995-12-18	R	Grachyovka, Russia
27	(Belarus)	Denis Drankov	1994-02-28	L	Mogilev, Belarus
29	(Belarus)	Alexander Fomin	1990-11-12	R	Minsk, Belarus
36	(Russia)	Yuri Lomakin	1995-05-29	R	Moscow, Russia
37	(Russia)	Yegor Motygulin	1991-12-21	L	Chelyabinsk, Russia
40	(Belarus)	Dmitri Lugakov	1995-02-20	L	Krugloe, Belarus
45	(Belarus)	Vitali Valkov	1994-01-04	L	Mogilev, Belarus
63	(Russia)	Vladislav Lomakin	1995-05-29	L	Moscow, Russia
73	(Belarus)	Sergei Zubarev	1992-08-09	L	Mogilev, Belarus
77	(Belarus)	Nikita Somov	1995-05-09	L	Mogilev, Belarus
81	(Russia)	Vitali Gorbachev	1985-10-30	R	Tynda, Russia
88	(Belarus)	Igor Rustamov	1995-05-26	R	Mogilev, Belarus
91	(Belarus)	Alexander Idiatullin	1995-09-01	L	Grodno, Belarus
