= HK Vitebsk =

- City: Vitebsk
- League: Belarusian Extraliga
- Home arena: Vitebsk Ice Sports Palace
- Website: vitebsk.hockey.by

HK Vitebsk is an ice hockey team in Vitebsk, Belarus. The team competes in the Belarusian Extraliga (BXL).
