= HK Brest =

- City: Brest, Belarus
- League: Belarusian Extraliga
- Founded: 2000
- Home arena: Brest Ice Sports Palace
- Website: brest-hockey.by

HK Brest is an ice hockey team in Brest, Belarus. The team competes in the Belarusian Extraliga (BXL). It was founded in 2001. Their home stadium is Brest Ice Sports Palace with a capacity of 2,000 people.
