= Belarusian Extraleague =

Top ice hockey league in Belarus

Belarusian Extraleague Экстраліга
- Sport: Ice hockey
- Founded: 1992; 34 years ago
- Founder: Belarusian Ice Hockey Association
- First season: 1992–93
- No. of teams: 14
- Country: Belarus (13 teams); Russia (1 team)
- Most recent champion: Metallurg Zhlobin (5th title) (2025–26)
- Most titles: Yunost Minsk (11 titles)
- Broadcaster: Belarus 5, Fanseat
- Related competitions: Vysshaya Liga
- Website: extra.hockey.by

The Belarusian Extraleague, abbreviated BHL, also known as the BETERA Extraleague for sponsorship reasons, or known as the Belarusian Open Championship, (Belarusian: Экстраліга, romanized: Ekstraliha), officially formed in 2006, is the top ice hockey league in Belarus. In its past, it has switched several times between being and not being an open league (in reference to allowing foreign teams), but for the 2008–2009 season, the Belarusian Ice Hockey Association decided to open the Belarusian Extraleague, the Belarusian Premier League and the Belarusian junior leagues.

Before the season 2018–2019 the Belarusian Extraleague was divided in two leagues: Extraleague A with 8 teams and Extraleague B with 9 teams. For the 2021–2022 season, this division into Extraleague A and Extraleague B was canceled, with 12 teams taking part in the single championship.

The Extraleague championships for the 2016–2017 season and 2017–2018 season were won by HC Neman Grodno.

The 2019/2020 Belarusian ice hockey championship was the only championship in the world that was not interrupted due to the coronavirus pandemic.

Teams from the BHL can participate in the IIHF's annual Champions Hockey League (CHL), competing for the European Trophy. Participation is based on the strength of the various leagues in Europe (excluding the European/Asian Kontinental Hockey League). Going into the 2022–23 CHL season, the BHL was ranked the No. 7 league in Europe, allowing them to send their top team to compete in the CHL.

== Current teams ==
=== 2024–25 season ===
Team	City	Arena	Capacity	Ice rink size	Affiliate Team
Aviator Baranovichi	(Belarus) Baranovichi	Baranovichi Ice Sports Palace	2,158	–	Sobol Beryoza (Belarus2)
HK Brest	(Belarus) Brest	Brest Ice Sports Palace	2,000	60x30	Sobol Beryoza (Belarus2)
HK Vitebsk	(Belarus) Vitebsk	Vitebsk Ice Sports Palace	1,900	61x30	Medvedi Vitebsk (Belarus2)
HC Dinamo-Molodechno	(Belarus) Molodechno	Molodechno Ice Sports Palace	2,197		Dinamo-Olimpik Minsk (Belarus2)
HK Gomel	(Belarus) Gomel	Gomel Ice Sports Palace	2,760	61х30	Rysi Gomel (Belarus2)
HK Lida	(Belarus) Lida	Lida Ice Palace	1,000	60х30	Rytsari Lida (Belarus2)
HK Lokomotiv Orsha	(Belarus) Orsha	Orsha Ice Sports Palace	3,500		Loko Orsha (Belarus2)
Metallurg Zhlobin	(Belarus) Zhlobin	Ice Palace Metalurg	2,018	60x30	Belstal Zhlobin (Belarus2)
HK Mogilev	(Belarus) Mogilev	Sports Palace Mogilev	3,048	60х30	Dneprovskiye Lvy Mogilev (Belarus2)
HC Neman Grodno	(Belarus) Grodno	Grodno Ice Sports Palace	2,550	60x30	Progress Grodno (Belarus2)
Khimik Novopolotsk	(Belarus) Novopolotsk	Novopolotsk Palace of Sports and Culture	1,200		Neftekhimik Novopolotsk (Belarus2)
Slavutych Smolensk	(Russia) Smolensk	SGAFKST Arena	–	–	Independent
HC Shakhtyor Soligorsk	(Belarus) Soligorsk	Soligorsk Sports and Entertainment Complex	1,759	60х29	Yastreby Pinsk (Belarus2)
HC Yunost-Minsk	(Belarus) Minsk	Čyžoŭka-Arena	8,807	61x30	HC Dinamo Minsk (KHL); Yunior Minsk (Belarus2)

== Former teams ==
Team	City	Arena	Capacity
Belarus U20	(Belarus) Minsk	Čyžoŭka-Arena Practice ice rink	473
Belarus U18	(Belarus) Raǔbičy	Indoor ice rink of sport complex Raǔbičy	300
Yastreby Pinsk	(Belarus) Pinsk	Ice arena of the Universal sports complex Volna	598
HC Babruysk	(Belarus) Babruysk	Babruysk Arena	7,191
Dinamo U20 Bobruisk	(Belarus) Babruysk	Babruysk Arena	7,151
Dinamo Minsk	(Belarus) Minsk	Minsk Sports Palace	3,311
Keramin Minsk	(Belarus) Minsk	Minsk Ice Palace	1,823
Shinnik Bobruisk	(Belarus) Babruysk	Babruysk Arena	7,151
Sokil Kyiv	(Ukraine) Brovary (Ukraine) Kyiv	Ice Arena TEC Terminal; Kyiv Palace of Sports	1,500; 7,200
Tivali Minsk	(Belarus) Minsk	Minsk Sports Palace	3,311
Torpedo Minsk	(Belarus) Minsk	Unknown	–
Triumph Minsk	(Belarus) Minsk	Unknown	–
Yunior Minsk	(Belarus) Minsk	Ice Palace Yunost Minsk	767
HK Liepājas Metalurgs	(Latvia) Liepāja	Ice Arena Liepājas Metalurgs	1,700
HK Riga 2000	(Latvia) Riga	Inbox.lv ledus halle	2,000
ASK/Ogre	(Latvia) Ogre	Vidzemes Ledus Halle	1,880
DHK Latgale	(Latvia) Daugavpils	Daugavpils Ice Arena	1,234

== Champions by season ==
=== Extraleague/Extraleague A ===
- 1992–93: Tivali Minsk
- 1993–94: Tivali Minsk
- 1994–95: Tivali Minsk
- 1995–96: Polimir Novopolotsk
- 1996–97: Polimir Novopolotsk
- 1997–98: Neman Grodno
- 1998–99: Neman Grodno
- 1999–2000: Tivali Minsk
- 2000–01: Neman Grodno
- 2001–02: Keramin Minsk
- 2002–03: HK Gomel
- 2003–04: Yunost Minsk
- 2004–05: Yunost Minsk
- 2005–06: Yunost Minsk
- 2006–07: Dinamo Minsk
- 2007–08: Keramin Minsk
- 2008–09: Yunost Minsk
- 2009–10: Yunost Minsk
- 2010–11: Yunost Minsk
- 2011–12: Metallurg Zhlobin
- 2012–13: Neman Grodno
- 2013–14: Neman Grodno
- 2014–15: HC Shakhtyor Soligorsk
- 2015–16: Yunost Minsk
- 2016–17: Neman Grodno
- 2017–18: Neman Grodno
- 2018–19: Yunost Minsk
- 2019–20: Yunost Minsk
- 2020–21: Yunost Minsk
- 2021–22: Metallurg Zhlobin
- 2022–23: Metallurg Zhlobin
- 2023–24: Metallurg Zhlobin
- 2024–25: Yunost Minsk
- 2025–26: Metallurg Zhlobin

=== Extraleague B ===
- 2018–19: HK Lokomotiv Orsha
- 2019–20: HK Lokomotiv Orsha
- 2020–21: Khimik Novopolotsk

== Titles by team ==
=== Extraleague/Extraleague A ===
Titles	Club	Years
11	Yunost Minsk	2004, 2005, 2006, 2009, 2010, 2011, 2016, 2019, 2020, 2021, 2025
7	HC Neman Grodno	1998, 1999, 2001, 2013, 2014, 2017, 2018
5	Tivali Minsk/HC Dinamo-Minsk*	1993, 1994, 1995, 2000, 2007*
5	Metallurg Zhlobin	2012, 2022, 2023, 2024, 2026
2	Polimir Novopolotsk	1996, 1997
2	Keramin Minsk	2002, 2008
1	HK Gomel	2003
1	HC Shakhtyor Soligorsk	2015

=== Extraleague B ===
Titles	Club	Years
2	HK Lokomotiv Orsha	2019, 2020
1	Khimik Novopolotsk	2021
