= Metallurg Zhlobin =

- City: Zhlobin, Belarus
- League: Belarusian Extraliga
- Home arena: Ice Palace "Metalurg" (capacity: 2,018)
- Website: metallurg.zhlobin.by

Metallurg Zhlobin (Belarusian: Металург Жлобін, romanized: Metalurh Zhlobin; Russian: Металлург Жлобин, romanized: Metallurg Zhlobin) is a professional ice hockey team in Zhlobin, Belarus. The team was formed in 2004 and competes in the Belarusian Extraliga (BXL).

== Winner ==
Belarusian Extraleague:

- - 2012, 2022, 2023

Belarusian Cup (ice hockey):

- - 2011
