= Khimik-SKA Novopolotsk =

- City: Novopolotsk
- League: Belarusian Extraliga
- Founded: 1964
- Home arena: Palace of Sports and Culture (capacity: 1,200)
- Website: hchimik.hockey.by

Franchise history
- 1964-1974: Neftyanik Novopolotsk
- 1974-1994: Khimik Novopolotsk
- 1994-2003: Polimir Novopolotsk
- 2003-2004: Khimik Novopolotsk
- 2004-present: Khimik-SKA Novopolotsk

Khimik-SKA Novopolotsk is an ice hockey team in Novopolotsk, Belarus. The team competes in the Belarusian Extraliga (BXL).

== Achievements ==
- Belarusian Extraliga champion (2): 1996, 1997.
