= HC Shakhtyor Soligorsk =

Shakhtyor Soligorsk
- City: Salihorsk, Belarus
- League: Belarusian Extraliga
- Founded: 2009
- Home arena: Soligorsk Sports and Entertainment Complex (1,800)
- Colors: Orange, Blue
- Head coach: Andrei Gusev
- Affiliate: Yastreby Pinsk (Belarus2)
- Website: shahter.hockey.by

Franchise history
- 2009-present: Shakhtyor Soligorsk

Championships
- Regular season titles: 0

Hockey Club Shakhtyor Soligorsk (Belarusian: ХК Шахцёр Салігорск, romanized: HK Shakhtsyor Salihorsk) is an ice hockey team based in Salihorsk (Soligorsk), Belarus. It was founded in 2009. It is playing in the Belarusian Extraliga. The team is currently formed to act as farm club for Yastreby Pinsk of the Belarusian Higher League.
