= HC Neman Grodno =

Neman Grodno
- City: Grodno, Belarus
- League: Belarusian Extraleague
- Founded: 1988
- Home arena: Grodno Ice Sports Palace
- General manager: Anatol' Varyvonchyk
- Head coach: Sergey Pushkov
- Captain: Andrey Korshunau
- Website: hcneman.by

Hockey Club Neman Grodno (Belarusian: ХК Нёман Гродна, HK Nioman Hrodna) is a professional ice hockey team from Grodno, Belarus that plays in the Belarusian Extraleague.

== History ==
=== Team names ===
- 1980–1986 KSM Grodno
- 1986–1988 ShVSM Grodno
- 1988–1991 Progress Grodno
- 1991–present Neman Grodno

== Winner ==
BSSR League (2):

- 1987, 1988

Belarusian Extraleague (7):

- 1998, 1999, 2001, 2013, 2014, 2017, 2018
  - – 1993, 1994, 2011, 2012, 2019, 2023
    - – 1995, 1996, 1997, 2000, 2002, 2020

Belarusian Cup (ice hockey) (3):

- 2014, 2016, 2018
  - – 2017

Eastern European Hockey League (1):

- 1996
  - – 1998, 1999, 2001

Continental Cup (1):

- Winners : 2014–15

== Rosters ==
=== Team in the season 2018/19 ===
Goaltenders
#	Nat	Name	Birthday
30	(Belarus)	Maksim Saman'kou	November 12, 1989
31	(Belarus)	Pavel Shalesny (Neman-2)	December 27, 2000
79	(Belarus)	Vital' Trus	June 24, 1988
Defenders
#	Nat	Name	Birthday
7	(Belarus)	Andrey Malatkou (Neman-2)	July 21, 1998
11	(Belarus)	Mikhail Kharamanda	October 7, 1991
21	(Belarus)	Andrey Korshunau	10 May 1983
25	(Russia)	Saveliy Skurikhin	July 2, 1994
23	(Russia)	Aleksey Lebedev (left the team in season)	June 23, 1993
49	(Belarus)	Raman Shuba (left the team in season)	June 1, 1994
52	(Russia)	Aleksandr Petrov	January 30, 1994
71	(Russia)	Roman Derlyuk (left the team in season)	October 27, 1986
77	(Belarus)	Nikita Kryskin	June 15, 1994
91	(Belarus)	Aliaksey Badun	August 30, 1989
97	(Belarus)	Anton Hryshanau	November 19, 1987
99	(Belarus)	Matvey Bazhko	January 10, 1996
Forwards
#	Nat	Name	Birthday
4	(Belarus)	Ihar Kazyachy (Neman-2)	November 4, 1998
9	(Belarus)	Dzmitry Ambrazheychyk	March 26, 1995
10	(Belarus)	Artur Buyak (Neman-2)	June 15, 1999
13	(Belarus)	Nikita Arlou (Neman-2)	March 12, 1999
15	(Belarus)	Raman Malinouski	June 8, 1991
17	(Belarus)	Anton Eliseenka	July 21, 1991
19	(Belarus)	Pavel Bayarchuk	November 7, 1990
28	(Belarus)	Artsyom Kisly	April 28, 1989
29	(Belarus)	Ihar Varyvonchyk	April 27, 1995
35	(Czech Republic)	Tomasz Pitule (left the team in season)	November 10, 1989
38	(Belarus)	Syarhey Malyauka	September 28, 1990
61	(Belarus)	Artur Savinau	July 4, 1997
63	(Belarus)	Yahor Stsyapanau	April 13, 1990
73	(Russia)	Sergey Smurov	July 26, 1993
74	(Belarus)	Artsyom Lyausha	September 24, 1992
83	(Belarus)	Aliaksandr Malyauka	September 28, 1990
90	(Belarus)	Nikita Remezau	July 28, 1990

== Coaches ==
=== Season 2009/10 ===
Nat	Position	Name	Birthday
(Belarus)	Head coach	Dzmitry Krauchanka	December 5, 1975
(Belarus)	Coach assistant	Aliaksandr Rummo	November 1, 1971
(Ukraine)	Goaltending coach	Yevgeni Brul	February 22, 1967

=== Season 2018/19 ===
Nat	Position	Name	Birthday
(Russia)	Head coach	Sergey Pushkov	February 25, 1964
(Russia)	Coach assistant	Aleksey Kuznetsov	April 27, 1983
(Russia) (Belarus)	Coach assistant	Aleh Malashkevich	January 4, 1972
(Lithuania)	Goaltending coach	Arunas Aleinikovas	7 May 1978
