= HK Gomel =

- City: Gomel
- League: Belarusian Extraliga
- Founded: August 24, 2000; 26 years ago
- Home arena: Ice Palace Gomel (capacity: 2,700)
- Colours: Red and Yellow
- Website: hcgomel.com

Franchise history
- HK Gomel

Championships
- Playoff championships: 2003
- Belarusian Cups: 2003, 2007

HK Gomel (Belarusian: ХК Гомель, romanized: HK Homyel') is an ice hockey team in Gomel in Belarus. It was founded in 2000, and participates in the Belarusian Extraliga.

== Honours ==
- Belarusian Extraliga:
  - Winners (1) : 2003
- Belarusian Cup (ice hockey):
  - Winners (4) : 2003,- май, 2007, 2012, 2017
