= Yunost Minsk =

- City: Minsk, Belarus
- League: Belarusian Extraleague
- Founded: 1991
- Home arena: Chizhovka-Arena
- Colours: Dark blue, red, white
- Website: junost.hockey.by

Championships
- Belarusian Extraleague: 11 (2004, 2005, 2006, 2009, 2010, 2011, 2016, 2019, 2020, 2021, 2025)

HC Yunost-Minsk (Belarusian: ХК «Юнацтва-Мінск») is a Belarusian professional ice hockey team that plays in the Belarusian Extraleague. They play their home games at Chizhovka-Arena, located in Minsk.

Yunost is the ten-times champion of Belarus, most recently in the 2024/2025 season. They won the Belarusian league three consecutive years thricely: in 2003/2004, 2004/2005, and 2005/2006; 2008/2009, 2009/2010, and 2010/2011; as well as 2018/2019, 2019/2020, and 2020/2021.

They played in the Russian Supreme Hockey League during the 2012–13 season. Yunost's place in the Belarusian Extraleague was taken by its reserve team.

Since 2012, it has been a feeder team of the KHL club Dinamo Minsk.

== Achievements ==
Belarus

- Belarusian Extraleague:
  - Winners (11) : 2004, 2005, 2006, 2009, 2010, 2011, 2016, 2019, 2020, 2021, 2025
- Belarus Cup:
  - Winners (7) : 2004, 2009, 2010, 2013, 2015, 2019, 2024

Soviet Union

- (Byelorussian Soviet Socialist Republic) BSSR League:
  - Winners (1) : 1980

Europe

- Continental Cup:
  - Winners (3) : 2007, 2011, 2018
