= Vostok, Primorsky Krai =

Human settlement in Krasnoarmeysky District, Primorsky Krai, Primorsky Krai, Russia

Vostok
- Urban-type settlement
- Location in Primorsky Krai, Russia
- Coordinates: 46°26′51″N 135°49′39″E
- Country: Russia
- Federal subject: Primorsky Krai
- District: Krasnoarmeysky District
- Granted status: 1980

Population (2010)4,103 (2010 census); 3,536 (2002 census); 6,106 (1989 Soviet census).
  - Total: 4,103
- Time zone: UTC+10 (VLAT)

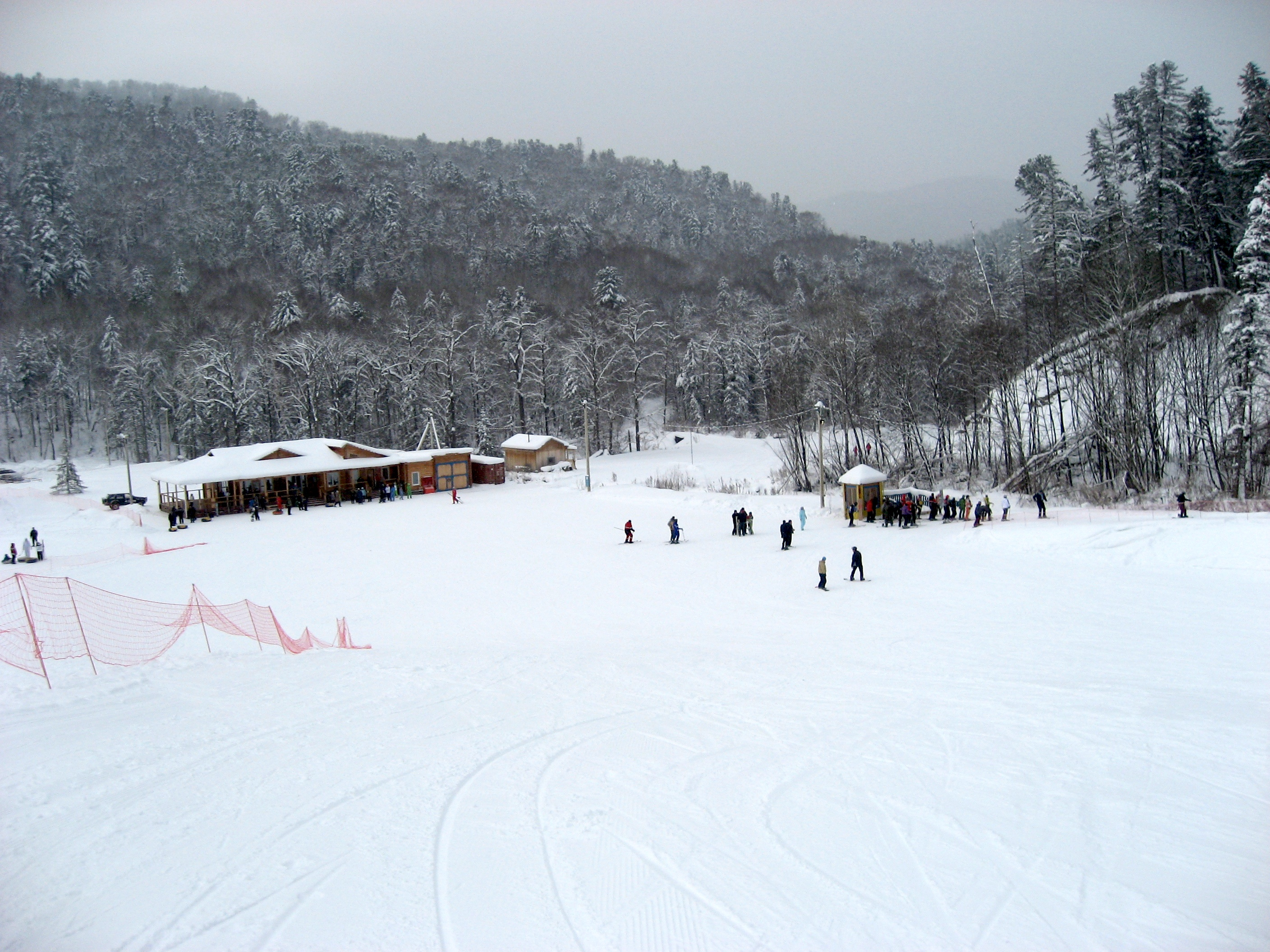
Mountain ski resort in Vostok

Vostok (Russian: Восто́к, lit. east) is an urban locality (an urban-type settlement) in Krasnoarmeysky District of Primorsky Krai, Russia, located 123 kilometers (76 mi) east from Novopokrovka. Population: 4,103 (2010 census); 3,536 (2002 census); 6,106 (1989 Soviet census).

== History ==
It is one of the most isolated settlements of the krai. It was granted urban-type settlement status in 1980.

== Economy ==
Primorsky Ore Mining and Processing Enterprise (Приморский горно-обогатительный комбинат) is the main industrial facility and also the main employer in Vostok. Its specialization is the production of tungsten.

== Transportation ==
There is no airport serving Vostok. The town is connected to the outside world only via a single-track road.
