= Krasnoarmeysky District, Primorsky Krai =

Krasnoarmeysky District Красноармейский район (Russian)
- District
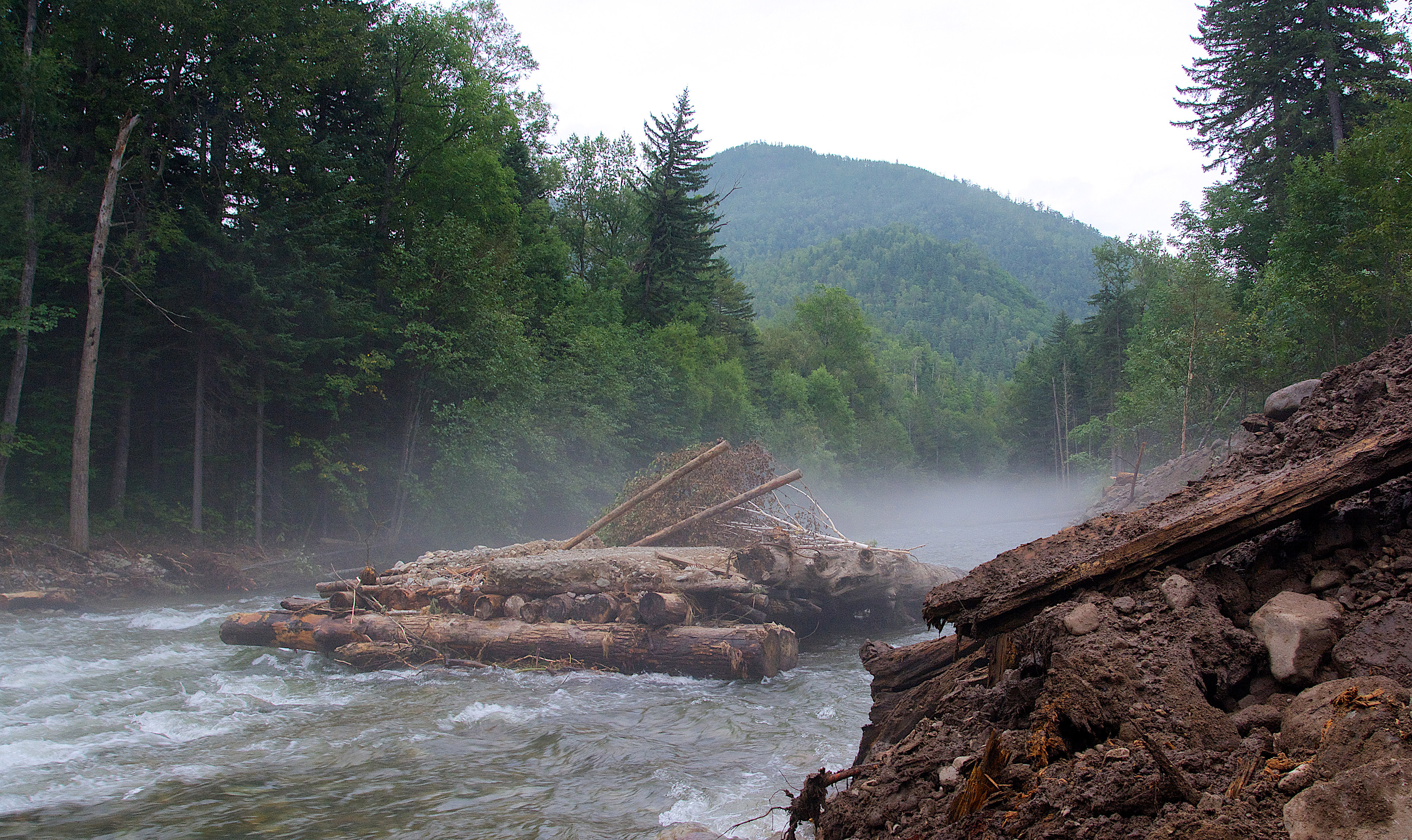
- Kema-Amgu, Krasnoarmeysky District

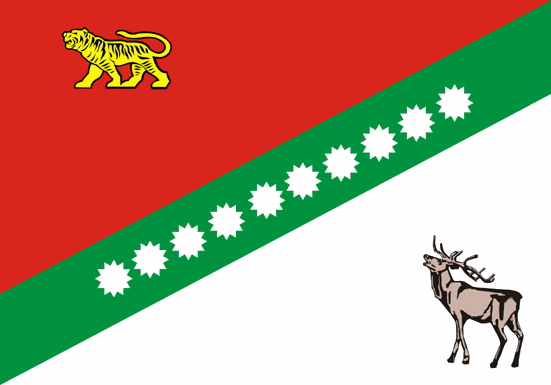
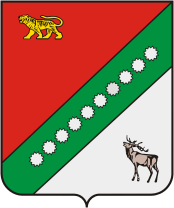
- Flag Coat of arms
- Location of Krasnoarmeysky District in Primorsky Krai
- Coordinates: 45°45′N 135°30′E
- Country: Russia
- Federal subject: Primorsky Krai
- Established: March 23, 1935
- Administrative center: Novopokrovka

Area
  - Total: 20,603.4 km^{2} (7,955.0 sq mi)

Population (2010 Census)
  - Total: 18,537
  - Density: 0.89971/km^{2} (2.3302/sq mi)
  - Urban: 22.1%
  - Rural: 77.9%

Administrative structure
  - Inhabited localities: 1 urban-type settlements, 26 rural localities

Municipal structure
  - Municipally incorporated as: Krasnoarmeysky Municipal District
  - Municipal divisions: 1 urban settlements, 9 rural settlements
- Time zone: UTC+10 (MSK+7)
- OKTMO ID: 05614000
- Website: http://mo.primorsky.ru/krasnoarmeisky/

Krasnoarmeysky District (Russian: Красноарме́йский райо́н) is an administrative and municipal district (raion), one of the twenty-two in Primorsky Krai, Russia. It is located in the center of the krai and borders with Pozharsky District in the northwest and north, Terneysky District in the east, the territory of Dalnegorsk Town Under Krai Jurisdiction in the south, and with Dalnerechensky District in the southwest and west. The area of the district is 20,603.4 square kilometers (7,955.0 sq mi). Its administrative center is the rural locality (a selo) of Novopokrovka. Population: 18,537 (2010 census); 20,820 (2002 census); 27,555 (1989 Soviet census). The population of Novopokrovka accounts for 19.7% of the district's total population.

== Geography ==
The main rivers in the district are the Bolshaya Ussurka and the Armu. The Sikhote-Alin Nature Reserve is located in the east of the district.

=== Climate ===
The climate conditions of Krasnoarmeysky District sharply differ from those on the coast. The Sikhote-Alin mountain range is a natural barrier which blocks the penetration of the monsoonal winds from the south and the east, forming a specific microclimate of the district. Frosts of −40 to −42 °C (−40 to −44 °F) are very frequent in winter, while in summer the heat exceeds +30 °C (86 °F). The mean annual temperature is −10 °C (14 °F), compared with +5 °C (41 °F) in the south of the krai. Despite the climate conditions, however, the population of the district grows apples, plums, cherries, and watermelons.

== Economy ==
Tungsten and timber, fur and gold are produced in the district. The Primorsky Ore Mining and Processing Enterprise operates here.

== Media ==
The Sikhote-Alin newspaper is published in the district.

== Notable residents ==
- Nikolai Stasenko (born 1987 in Roshchino), Belarusian ice hockey player
