= Orekhovka =

- Native name: Ореховка (Russian)

Location
- Country: Russia

Physical characteristics
- Source
  - location: Sikhote-Alin
- Mouth: Malinovka
  - coordinates: 45°35′59″N 134°17′11″E
- Length: 80 km (50 mi)

Basin features
- Progression: Malinovka→ Bolshaya Ussurka→ Ussuri→ Amur→ Sea of Okhotsk

The Orekhovka (Russian: Ореховка, formerly Сандо-Вака Sando-Vaka) is a river in Dalnerechensky District, Primorsky Krai, Russia. It is the longest tributary of Malinovka, which it enters about 111 km from the Malnikova's confluence with the Bolshaya Ussurka.

The Orekhovka drainage basin covers about 1,810 square kilometres (700 mi^{2}). The river is 80 kilometres (50 mi) long. The usual depth of the river is 1 to 1.5 metres (3.3 to 4.9 ft).

There are two hydrologic posts on the river near the villages of Polyany and Yasnaya Polyana.
