= Dalnerechensky =

Dalnerechensky (masculine), Dalnerechenskaya (feminine), or Dalnerechenskoye (neuter) may refer to:

- Dalnerechensky District, a district of Primorsky Krai, Russia
- Dalnerechensky Urban Okrug, the municipal formation which the town of Dalnerechensk, Primorsky Krai, Russia, is incorporated as
