= Salsky =

Salsky (masculine), Salskaya (feminine), or Salskoye (neuter) may refer to:

- Salsky District, a district of Rostov Oblast, Russia
- Salskoye Urban Settlement, an administrative division and a municipal formation which the town of Salsk in Salsky District of Rostov Oblast is incorporated as
- Salsky (rural locality) (Salskaya, Salskoye), several rural localities in Russia
- Salskaya Hill, an extinct volcano near the town of Dalnerechensk in Primorsky Krai, Russia
- Volodymyr Salsky (1885–1940), Ukrainian general and the head of the Ukrainian government in exile
