= K. Rudzki i S-ka =

Polish engineering and machinery company

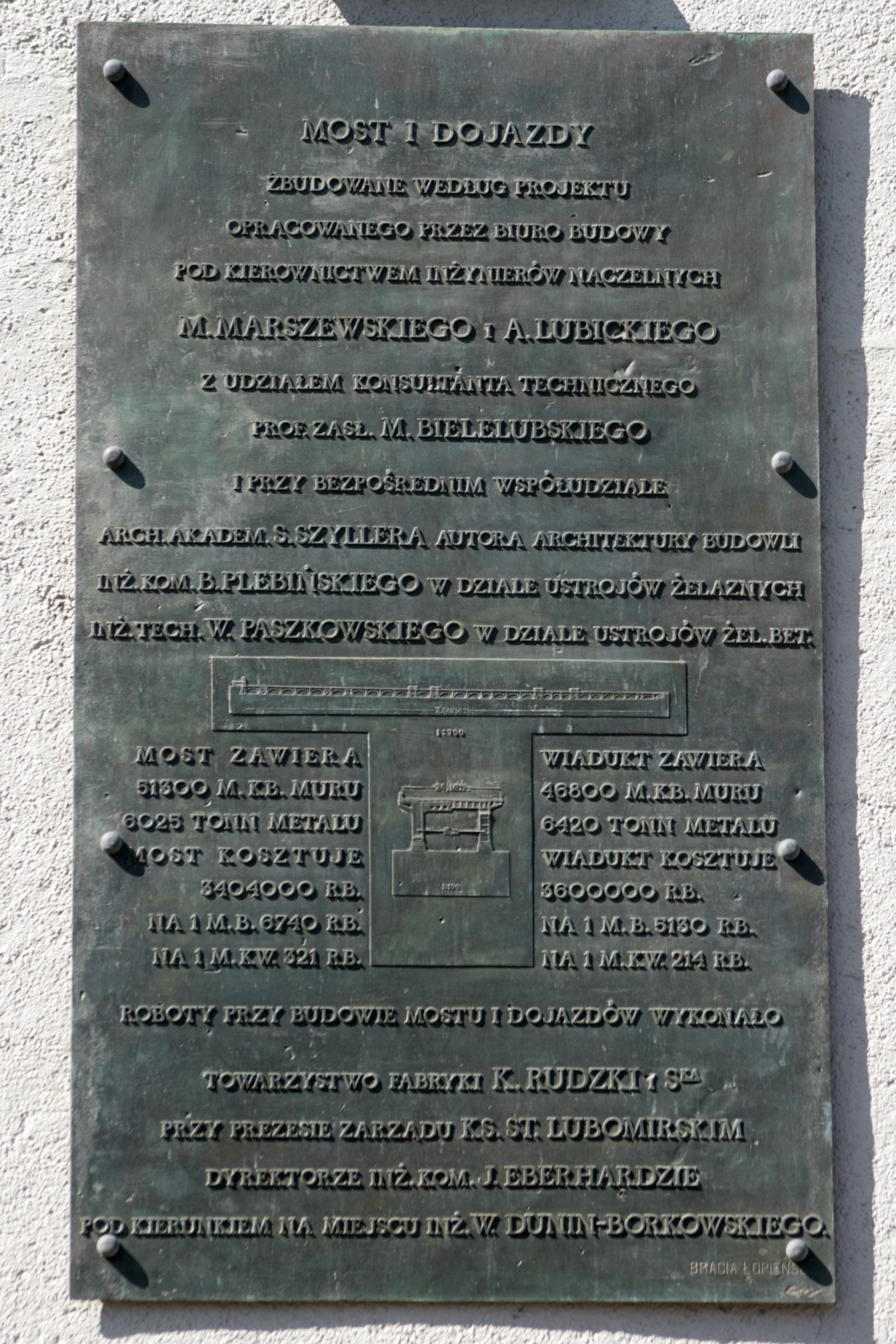
- Commemorative plaque at Poniatowski Bridge in Warsaw, listing K. Rudzki i S-ka as the contractor
- Founded: Warsaw, Poland (1858)
- Founder: Konstanty Rudzki
- Defunct: 1948
- Fate: nationalised and dissolved after 1945
- Successor: Fabryka Urządzeń Dźwigowych
- Headquarters: Warsaw and Mińsk Mazowiecki, Poland
- Number of locations: 2
- Owner: Konstanty Rudzki
- Number of employees: 100 in 1860; 221 in 1879 over 1000 in 1914

K. Rudzki i S-ka (Konstanty Rudzki & Co. Ltd.) was a Polish engineering and machinery company. Founded in Warsaw in 1858 as an iron foundry by a shipbuilding magnate Andrzej Artur Zamoyski and led by Konstanty Rudzki, it soon expanded into machinery, steel and engineering. By the end of the 19th century the company, with its seat in Warsaw and a large factory in Mińsk Mazowiecki, had become one of the largest and most experienced bridge construction contractors in Central and Eastern Europe, with roughly 20% of bridges constructed in the Russian Empire bearing the logo of K. Rudzki. After World War I the company declined and ceased its machinery production arm, but continued on as an engineering and construction business. It was nationalised and liquidated after World War II.

Throughout its existence the company was responsible for some of the most innovative bridge undertakings in the world, including the 1914 Poniatowski Bridge, the 1916 Khabarovsk Bridge (for decades the longest bridge in Eurasia at over 2,500 metres in length) and the 1927 Maurzyce Bridge, the first welded road bridge in the world.

== Names ==
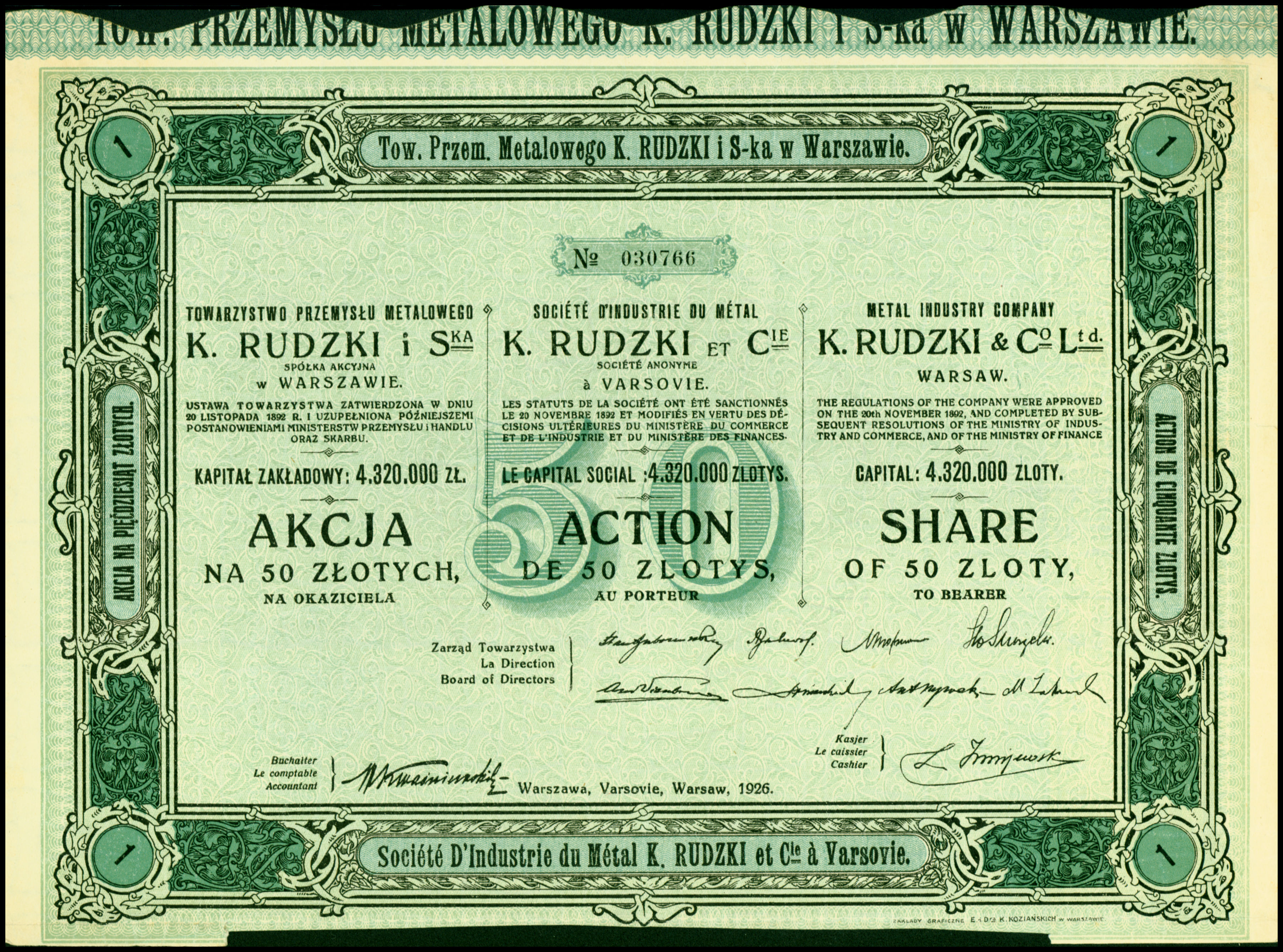
Share of the K. Rudzki i S-ka, issued 1926

The original foundry that formed the core of the future company was named simply "K. Rudzki i S-ka" - "K. Rudzki and Co." (S-ka being a contemporary abbreviation of the word "Spółka", meaning "Company"). When the firm expanded into engineering, machinery construction and other areas, its name was changed and until 1932 it was "Towarzystwo Akcyjne Fabryki Machin i Odlewów "K. Rudzki i Ska"", which could roughly be translated as "'K. Rudzki and Co.' Factory of Machinery and Casts, Joint-stock Association". The official name was then changed to "Towarzystwo Przemysłu Metalowego "K. Rudzki i Spółka" SA" - "Metal Industry Company 'K. Rudzki & Co. Ltd.'". Regardless of the official name of the company, the surname of its founder became almost synonymous with the company itself, especially once Konstanty Rudzki died in 1899, at the height of the company's expansion.

== History ==
In 1858, Konstanty Rudzki, a Polish engineer with experience in Western European steel and mining industries, was tasked by Count Zamoyski with creating a foundry in Warsaw. Zamoyski needed a specialised local firm to cooperate with his expanding shipbuilding business, so he financed the creation of the foundry, named K. Rudzki and Company. Initially, the company was in fact a joint-venture of three parties. Zamoyski was the financial backer and principal client. The second party was a partnership of Jakub Baird and Samuel Hirsz Mühlrad, both managers of steel and iron mills in the Old-Polish Industrial Region. The third party was Rudzki himself, who provided the necessary know-how and whose share was to be repaid with future profits of the new company as he brought no money into the company.

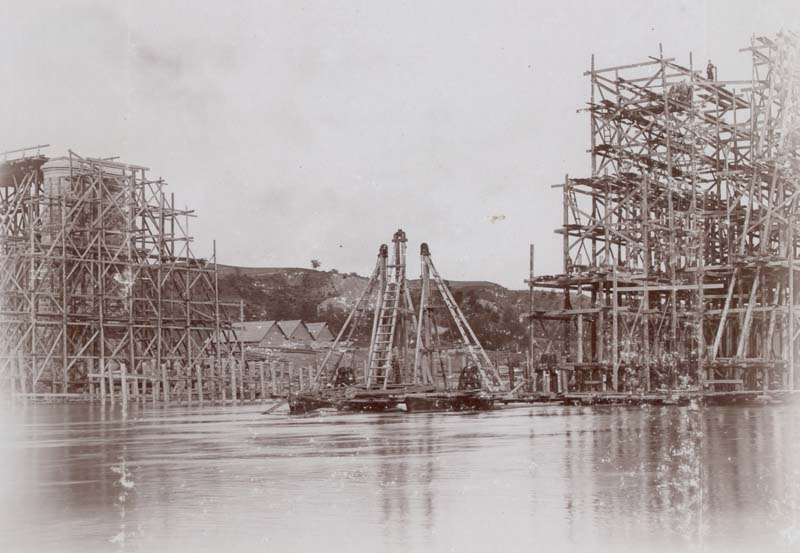
K. Rudzki i S-ka was the only firm in the entire Russian Empire to both design bridges, produce them, transport their parts to the construction site and build them, complete with caisson works, pylons and bridgeheads. Pictured construction of bridge over Niemen, 1899

The new factory, initially located at the intersection of Czerniakowska and Rozbrat Streets in Warsaw's borough of Czerniaków, in what was to become the Czerniaków Port, was among the most modern foundries in the Kingdom of Poland. The area was chosen both for its proximity to the port and the principal client, and for easy availability of workers, many of whom lived in nearby areas of Warsaw. The factory was equipped with a modern steam engine powering the fans of two cupola furnaces, while the steam in the engine was heated by the furnaces themselves. In addition, the steam engine also powered a turnery and several other mechanisms. The fuel was provided by six coke furnaces installed on the premises. In 1860 the factory had a crew of roughly 100 workers and produced all types of cast iron, copper and brass products, from agricultural machinery, through iron piping and weights, to machinery for wood, food and paper industries.

In March 1860, Jakub Baird died and his assets in the company were taken over by Count Zamoyski. In 1862 he planned to unify the K. Rudzki steel works with his riverine shipyard and extend the company's existence for another 20 years, but the outbreak of the January Uprising prevented his plans from coming to life. In the aftermath of the Uprising, Zamoyski was exiled to France, and his riverine flotilla and the river shipyard were taken over by other companies. Although he remained a de jure owner of most shares of the company for a couple more years, already on 29 January 1863 both Zamoyski and Mühlrad were banned from any effective control over the company. This left Rudzki as de facto sole shareholder and the only member of the board to still have a vote.

== After the annexation of Congress Poland ==
Rudzki's company survived the war and continued on without the support of its once principal client. In the late 1860s the company expanded into machinery production, with new mechanical workshops being opened. At the 1876 Centennial Exposition in Philadelphia the "K. Rudzki i S-ka" company presented the Warszawianka, a revolutionary mechanical reaper, considered one of principal Polish inventions of the late 19th century.

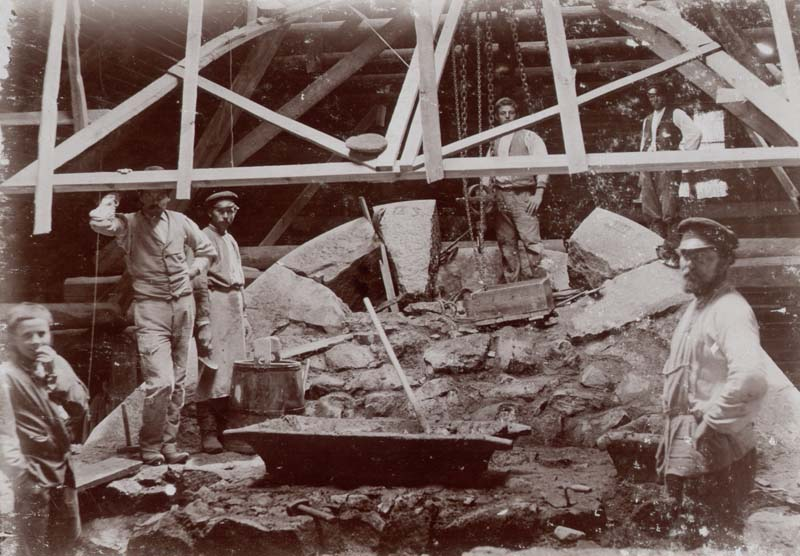
Workers and engineers on the construction site of a new railway bridge over the Neman River near Olita, before 1899

In 1866 Konstanty Rudzki donated part of the courtyard of the factory to the city of Warsaw and a new street was built there, since 1869 known as Fabryczna - "Factory Street".

By 1873 Konstanty Rudzki was able to acquire all outstanding shares in the company for a price of 51,600 roubles. However, he over-invested and the company could not repay its debt of 12,000 roubles so in 1878 Konstanty Rudzki was forced to find new partners. Eventually he retained 52 percent of shares, with the remainder in the hands of Alfred Czarnomski, Władysław Mazurowski and Józef Korycki. Since then the company started to expand rapidly. In 1879 there were 221 workers employed in Rudzki's Warsaw works, by the end of the 19th century the number rose to 890, while value of production rose from 180,000 roubles to 2,132,000 roubles. In 1892 the company was also formally transformed into a joint stock company.

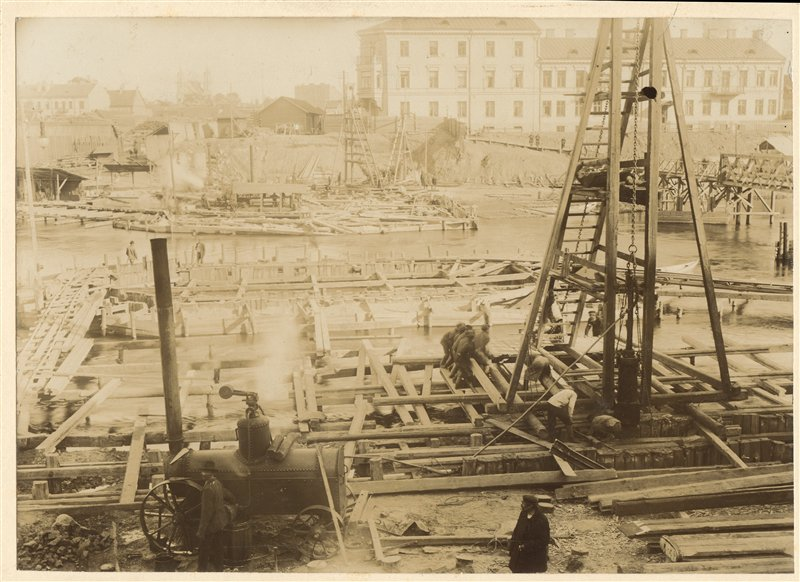
The Zwierzyniec Bridge in Vilna was built by K. Rudzki i S-ka in 1906

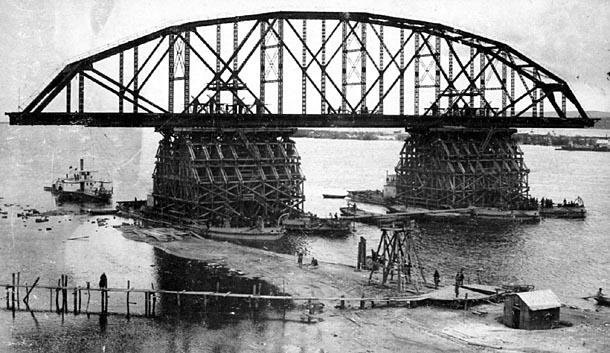
Construction of the Khabarovsk Bridge designed by Proskuryakov

Initially the K. Rudzki i S-ka benefited from fast industrialisation of the Kingdom of Poland. In 1881 it obtained a patent for an innovative method of piping production, which allowed it to become one of principal contractors during the construction of Warsaw Waterworks and sewage system. Another major sector of K. Rudzki's activities was the rail roads of the Russian Empire. The company entered the market as a producer of sewage pipes for train stations, but soon expanded into bridge construction. Thanks to Konstanty Rudzki's innovative approach, his company became the only firm in the entire Russian Empire to be able to design a bridge, manufacture it, transport it to the construction site and build it in place, complete with caisson works and bridgeheads. It was also the only company in the Russian Empire to construct difficult bridges in remote locations.

Between 1891 and 1899 the company constructed many railway bridges all around the Russian Empire, spanning Volga River, Amu-Daria, Amur River, Neva River, Nercha, Inga, Northern Dvina, Khor, Iman and Bikin, and many others. The main clients were the Warsaw–Terespol Railway, Siedlce-Płock Railway, Warsaw–Kalisz Railway, Perm-Kotlas Railway, Southwestern Railways in Ukraine and Ussuri Railway. Most larger railway bridges constructed in Poland during that period were also built by K. Rudzki company, including Modlin Bridge across Bugonarew and the 1906 Zwierzyniec Bridge in Vilna. Almost 20% of all bridges constructed in Russia in that period were built by Konstanty Rudzki and his engineers.

The steel elements were produced entirely in a new factory constructed in Mińsk Mazowiecki. They were then transported to the final destination either by rail or by ship (from the port of Odessa, through the Suez Canal to Nikolayevsk-on-Amur in the Far East, and then by river barges upstream), and then assembled by company's workers and engineers on site. To complement the bridge production, in 1897 the company founded a new bearing factory in Warsaw, along with a new cast steel factory, the first such facility in Warsaw. In 1893 Konstanty Rudzki retired from running day-to-day operations of the company, but remained its president until his death in 1899. In this last period he focused mostly on improving work and safety conditions. Among other actions he financed the creation of a shelter for elderly and disabled workers, and in 1895 he paid for all workers to be covered by an insurance policy.

== 20th century ==
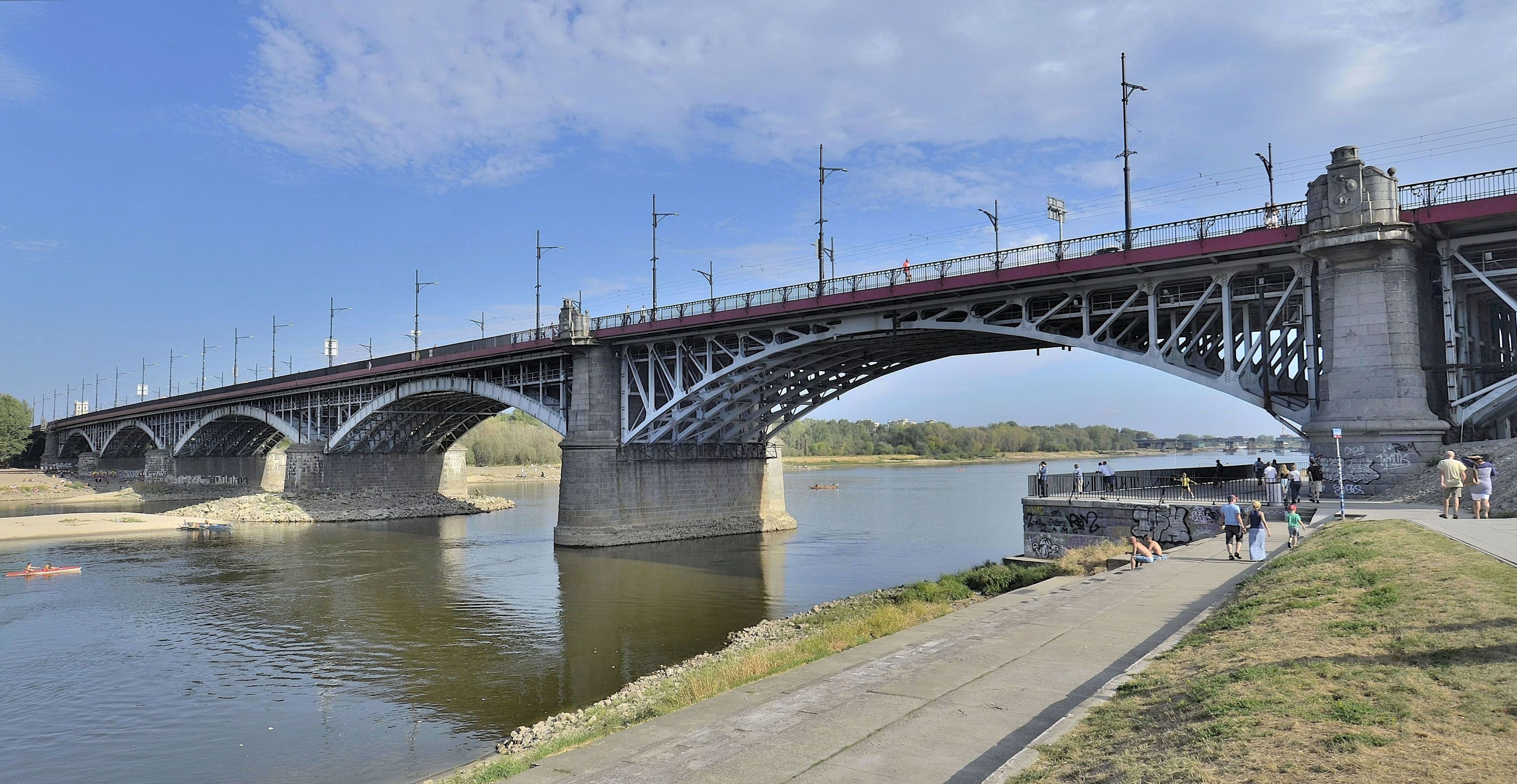
Poniatowski Bridge, Warsaw, built in 1904–14

In the early 20th century, the bridge construction activities expanded even further. In 1902 K. Rudzki i S-ka entered into a cartel agreement with several similar Russian firms and secured 17 percent of all bridge construction contracts in Russian Empire. Altogether in the first two decades of the 20th century the company built 5,000 metres of steel road bridges and 24,000 metres of various rail bridges for 37 different railway companies, in addition to providing them with a net of over 2 million metres of water pipelines. Among the steel bridges constructed by K. Rudzki were Warsaw's Poniatowski Bridge, but also most of Trans-Siberian Railway's river crossings, including the 1916 Khabarovsk Bridge (at over 2,500 metres of length for decades the longest bridge in Eurasia). The company also built bridges for the Orenburg-Tashkent Railway, Saint Petersburg–Warsaw Railway, Amur Railway (all bridges on the eastern and middle sections of the line), Ussuri Railway and Chinese Eastern Railway, among others. The company was also one of principal contractors during the construction of St. Peter and St. Paul's Church in Warsaw (now St. Barbara's Church in Warsaw) (1894) and Hale Mirowskie (1899–1901), it also continued to produce machinery for railway companies, overhead cranes, elevators, artillery, boilers, centrifugal pumps, water turbines and many other types of machinery. It was also one of principal military contractors, producing artillery shells (since 1905), shrapnel ammunition (since 1909) and airship hangars (1914). Between 1893 and 1914 the equity of the company rose by a factor of 6, from 600,000 roubles to over 4 million. Total sale value for 1914 amounted to 11.6 million rubles.

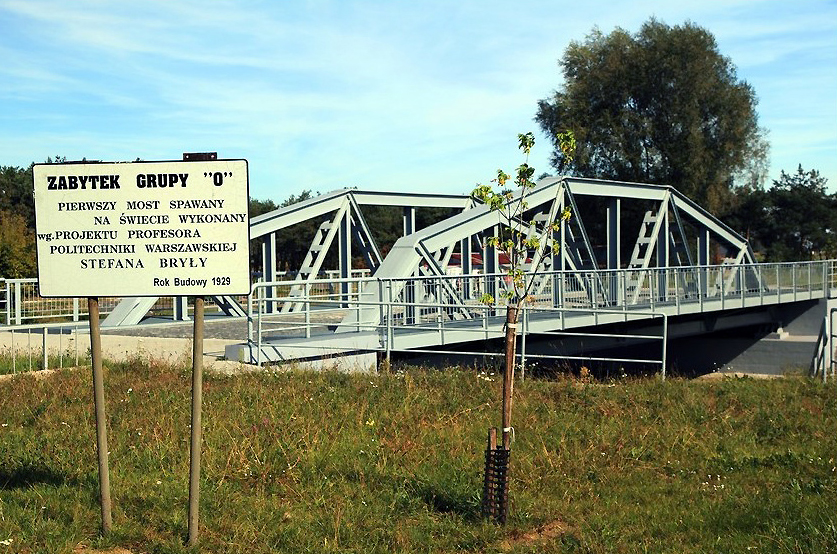
Maurzyce Bridge, built in 1929

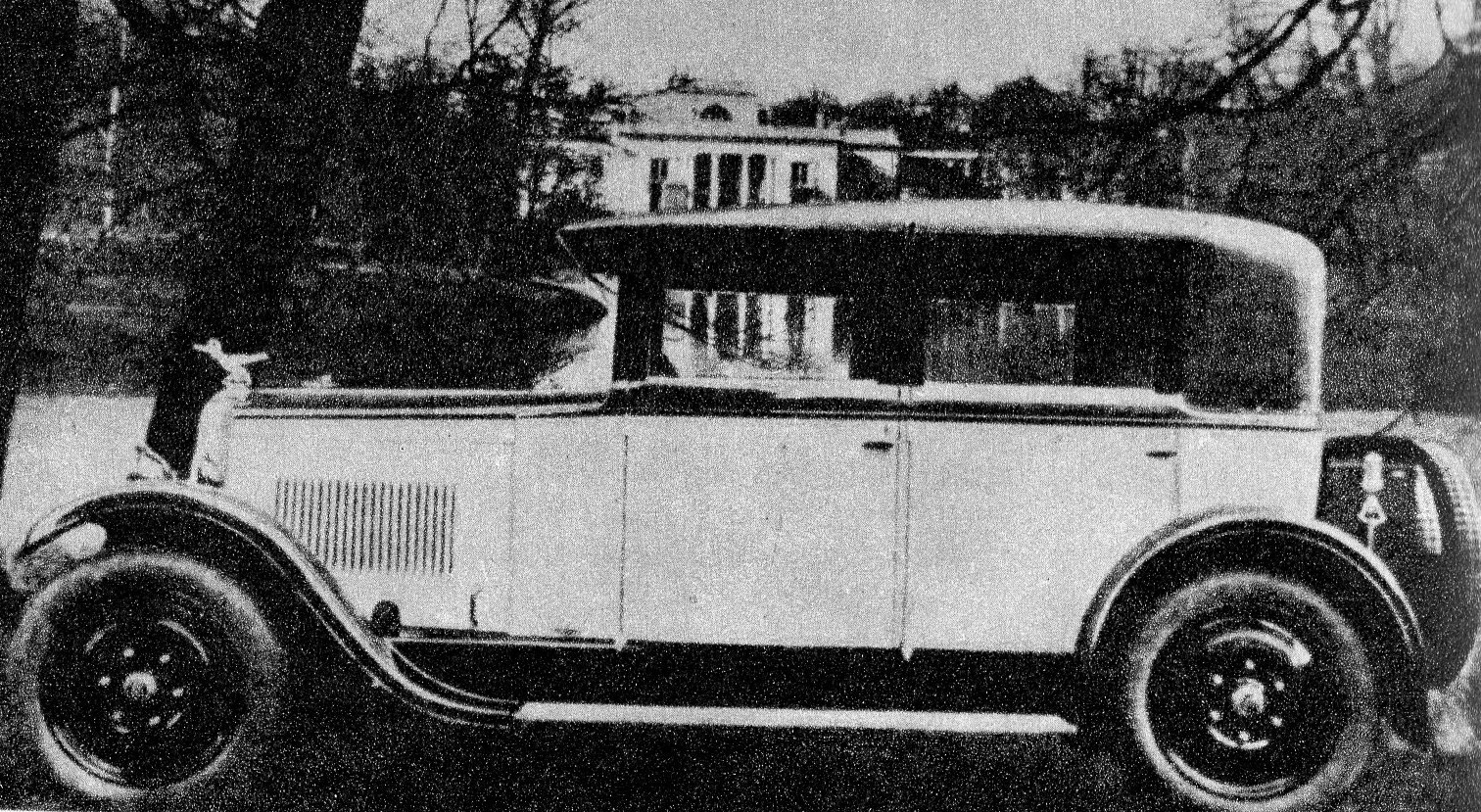
Ralf-Stetysz car

The growth of the company stopped due to the outbreak of World War I. After the war, the Russian Revolution and the Polish-Bolshevist War, the company was permanently cut off from its eastern markets and production branches of the firm never recovered. It continued as a construction and engineering company. Despite attempts at entering the automobile production market through Ralf-Stetysz cars, in 1933 the Warsaw factory was closed down completely and only the Mińsk Mazowiecki plant remained operational. The equity of the post-war company remained high nevertheless, with over 4.32 million Polish złoty in 1924. The company continued to participate in some of the most difficult engineering projects of the interbellum, including the construction of Maurzyce Bridge, the first welded road bridge in the world, in 1927. It also built the Transatlantic Radio Exchange in Stare Babice, one of the largest radio stations of the epoch. However, due in part to the Great Depression, the value of sales continued to drop, from 17.5 million złotys in revenue in 1929 to 5.7 million in 1936. The company, however, was still one of the principal bridge constructors in Poland, securing many prestigious contracts, such as the Ignacy Mościcki Bridge in Puławy.

One of the last bridges completed by K. Rudzki i S-ka before the war was the Legions of Marshal Józef Piłsudski Bridge across Vistula in Płock. The difficult construction of the then-longest bridge in Poland was completed in under two years by K. Rudzki i S-ka and another company, Przedsiębiorstwo Robót Inżynieryjnych Leszek Muszyński. The bridge was opened for traffic in late 1938 and demolished only a year later, during the opening stages of the Invasion of Poland.

During World War II, the factory was nationalised by Nazi Germans and given to the Krupp concern and renamed to Krupp Bridge Factory. Initially it housed a German POW camp for Polish, French and Soviet prisoners of war. With time the POW camp was moved to another place nearby, while the factory started to increasingly rely on slave labour, notably from the Mińsk Mazowiecki Ghetto. After the liquidation of the ghetto in 1942, several hundred Jewish workers remained in the former Rudzki plant, but the last 104 of them were mass murdered by the Germans on 5 June 1943.

After World War II, the factory was nationalised and officially ceased to exist in 1948. Its production plant in Mińsk Mazowiecki was not damaged by the war, but was nationalised and then taken over by a new, state-owned company producing steel elements for bridge construction, overhead cranes and similar machinery. Its descendant now functions under the name of Fabryka Urządzeń Dźwigowych.

== See also ==
- Lilpop, Rau i Loewenstein
