= Lentvaris =

- City
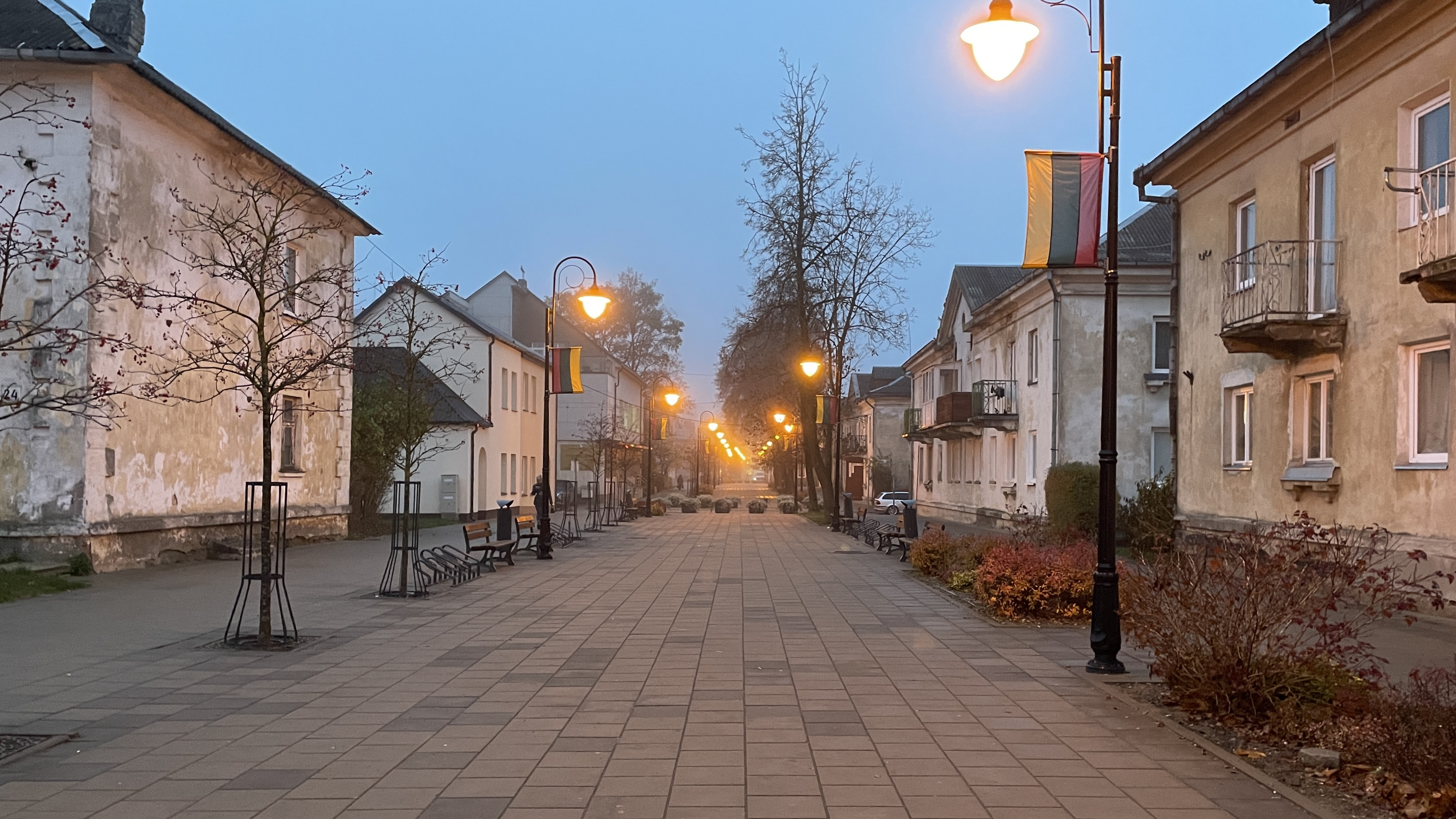
- Church Street in Lentvaris

- Coat of arms

- Location of Lentvaris
- Coordinates: 54°39′0″N 25°4′0″E
- Country: Lithuania
- Ethnographic region: Dzūkija
- County: Vilnius County
- Municipality: Trakai district municipality
- Eldership: Lentvaris eldership
- Capital of: Lentvaris eldership
- First mentioned: 17th century
- Granted city rights: 1946

Population (2022)
  - Total: 9,618
- Time zone: UTC+2 (EET)
  - Summer (DST): UTC+3 (EEST)

Lentvaris (Polish: Landwarów) is a city in eastern Lithuania, 9 km east of Trakai. It is a transportation hub, as several road and rail routes cross here. Lake Lentvaris is nearby.

== History ==
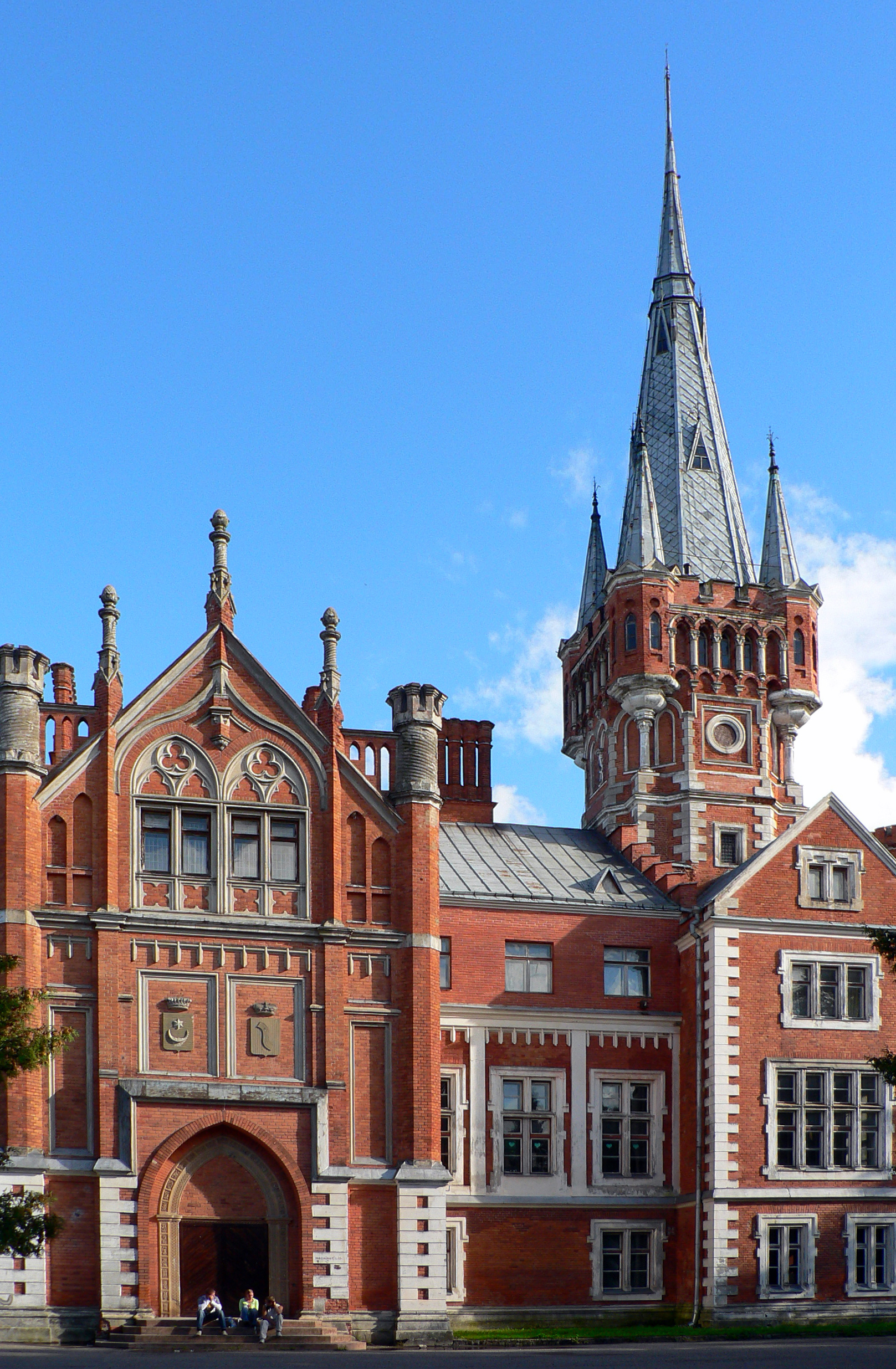
Tiškevičiai palace in Lentvaris

The town is situated in ethnographically Baltic Lithuanian territory and was historically a territory of Lithuania Proper situated close to a capital city Vilnius. In the 19th century the Polonization of Eastern Lithuania started thus the city started to become multilingual. In the 18th Century, the city of Lentvaris, was within the Polish–Lithuanian Commonwealth. It was populated by Poles, Lithuanians and Jews and belonged to the estate of the Polish-Lithuanian House of Sapieha. Following the partitions of Polish-Lithuanian Commonwealth the town became part of the Russian Empire. In 1850 the town was owned by Izdebski and then sold on to another Polish-Lithuanian magnate clan, the Tiškevičiai family. In 1885 they had a Tudor-style palace built with a park, designed by Édouard André. In 1869 an industrial nail factory was established in the city.

After the Żeligowski's Mutiny in 1920, Lentvaris was annexed by Poland and was part of Poland in the Wilno–Troki District of the Wilno Voivodeship.

In September 1939, Nazi Germany attacked Poland simultaneously with the Soviet Union. The town was taken over by the Soviets on September 19, 1939. Local Polish soldiers, who had fought in the September Campaign, were attacked and interned by Lithuanians in the city of Kretinga. Between 1942 and 1943, a Jewish partisan unit headed by Abba Kovner operated in the area. They blew up a train bound from Warsaw to Vilnius, near Lentvaris station, on the stretch between Vilnius and Grodno. Twenty one carriages carrying German troops and supplies were derailed.

== Demography ==
=== Population ===
According to the 2021 census, the city population was 9,713 people, of which:

- Lithuanians – 55.44% (5,385)
- Poles – 25.64% (2,491)
- Russians – 11.33% (1,101)
- Belarusians – 3.30% (321)
- Ukrainians – 0.94% (92)
- Others / did not specify – 3.24% (315)

Historical population

Year	Pop.	±% p.a.
1959	4,216	—
1970	8,235	+6.28%
1979	10,167	+2.37%
1989	12,694	+2.24%

Year	Pop.	±% p.a.
2001	11,773	−0.63%
2011	11,105	−0.58%
2021	9,713	−1.33%

Source: 1902, 1923, 1959 & 1970, 1979, 1989, 2001, 2011

== Famous people ==
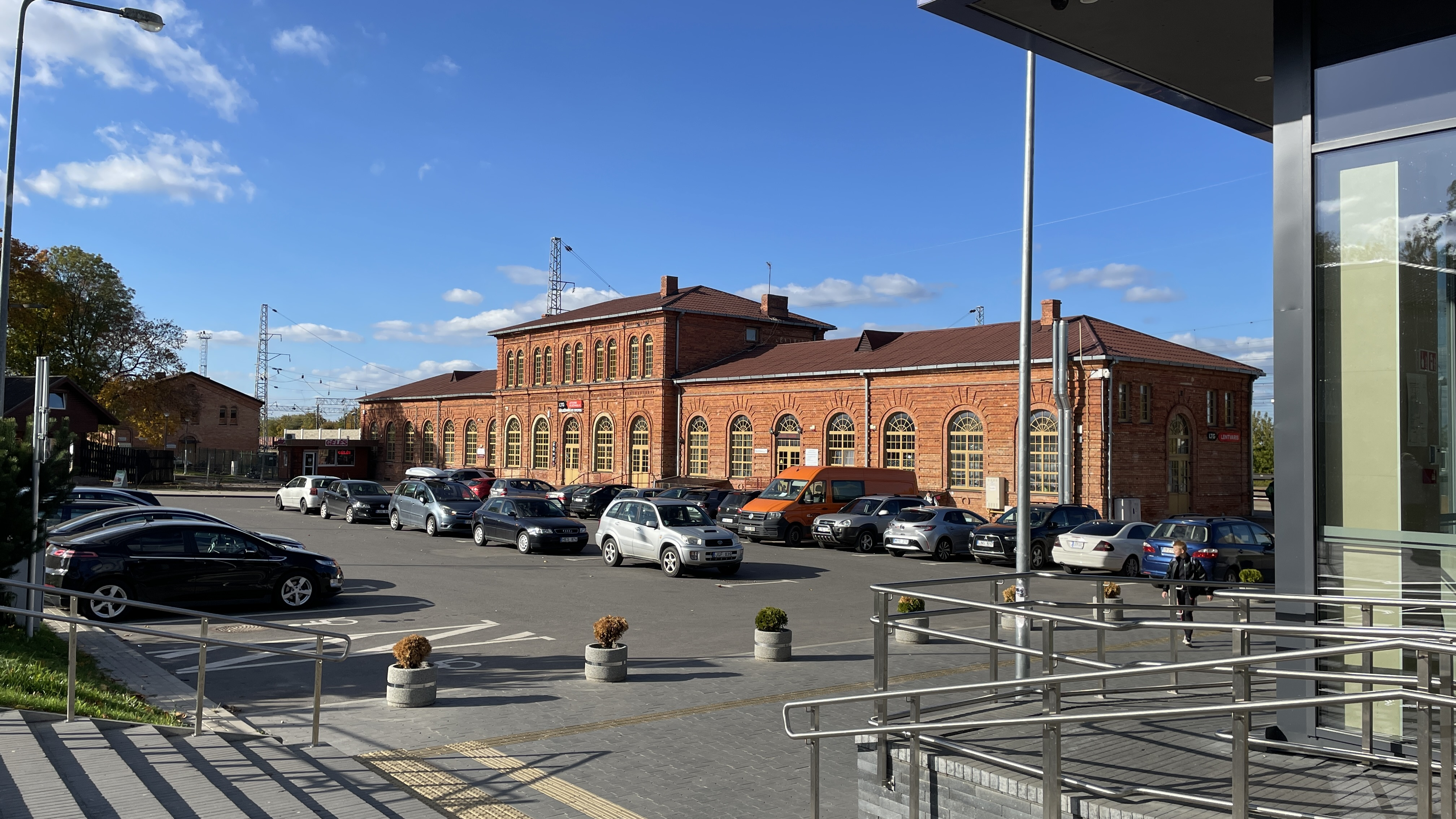
Lentvaris railway station

- Stefan Tyszkiewicz (1894–1976), last heir to the Tyszkiewicz estate of Landwarów, was a noted engineer and inventor. In the 1920s he was an early pioneer of the Polish automotive industry through his firm, Stetysz. His life was much interrupted by wars, but he never ceased to apply his technical skills. After his arrest in Lithuania by the Soviets during World War II, he was imprisoned in Lubianka Prison, then released to join Anders' Army and its great exodus through the Middle East to Italy. After the war he remained an exile until his death in London.
- In 1932, a wedding between Rebbetzin Shaina, daughter of Lubavitcher Rebbe, Rabbi Yosef Yitzchok Schneersohn and Rabbi Menachem Mendel Horenstein, the Rebbe's cousin, was held in the town.
- Teresa Żylis-Gara, the 20th century soprano singer was born in Lentvaris. In 2004 she founded a Pipe organ in the Polish Roman-Catholic church pw. Zwiastowania NMP in the city.

== See also ==
- Polish-Lithuanian war
