= Lyudmila Talabayeva =

Russian politician (born 1957)

- Людмила Талабаева
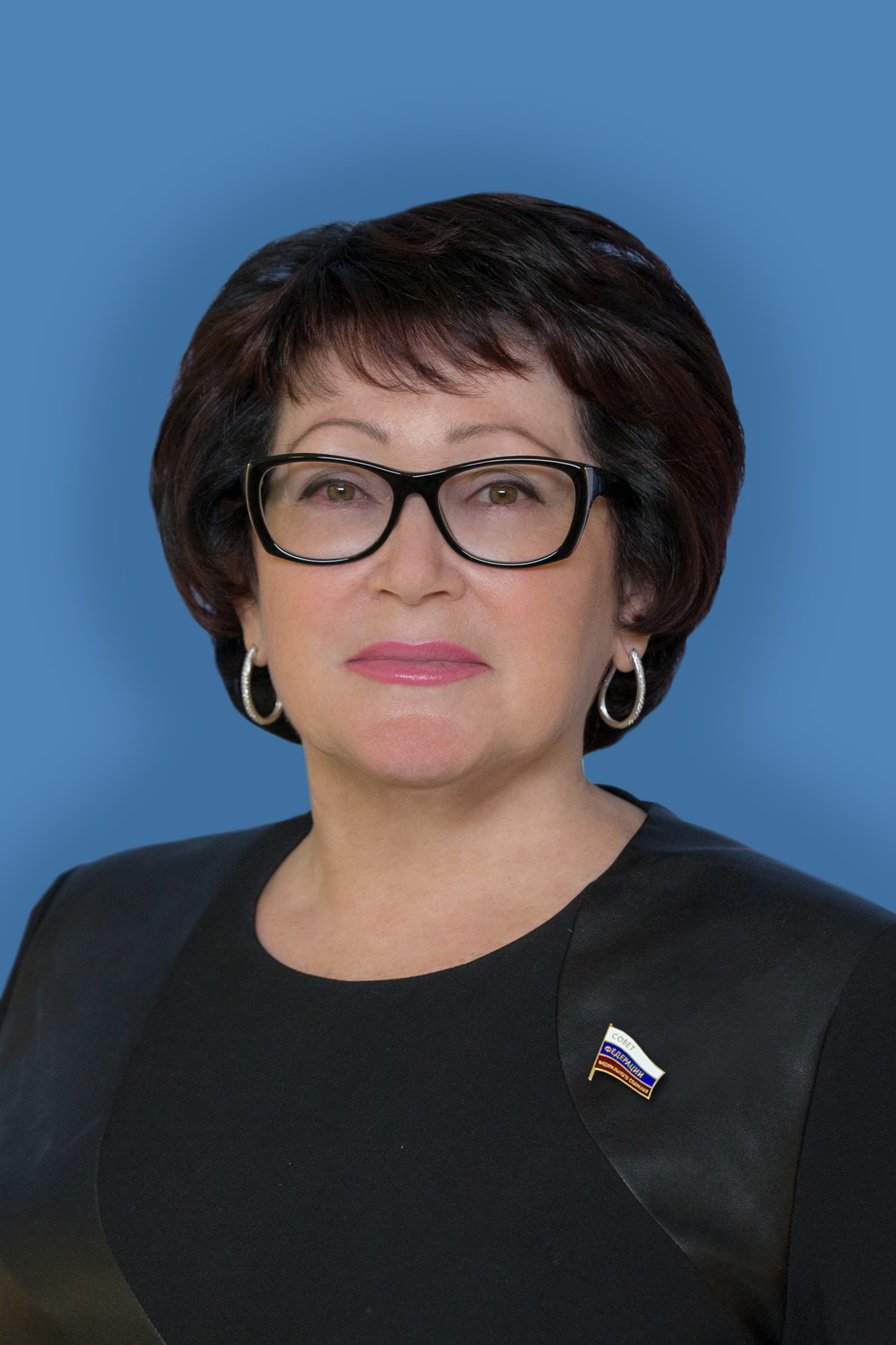

Senator from Primorsky Krai
- Incumbent
- Assumed office 8 October 2021
- Preceded by: Viacheslav Fetisov

Personal details
- Born: Lyudmila Talabayeva; 6 June 1957 (age 69) Krasnoarmeysky District, Primorsky Krai, Russian Soviet Federative Socialist Republic, Soviet Union
- Party: United Russia
- Education: Far Eastern State Technical Fisheries University

Lyudmila Zaumovna Talabayeva (Russian: Людмила Заумовна Талабаева; born 6 June 1957) is a Russian politician serving as a senator from Primorsky Krai since 8 October 2021.

== Biography ==
Lyudmila Talabayeva was born on 6 June 1957 in Cherkessk, Karachay-Cherkess Autonomous Oblast. In 1979, she graduated from the Far Eastern State Technical Fisheries University. After that she moved to Belarus. In 1985 she moved back to Primorsky Krai where she worked in various industrial fishery enterprises. In 2007, she became deputy of the Vladivostok State Duma of the 3rd and 4th convocations. On 18 September 2016, she was elected deputy of the Legislative Assembly of Primorsky Krai. On 5 October 2016, Talabayeva became the senator from the Legislative Assembly of Primorsky Krai. In 2021, she was re-elected.

=== Sanctions ===
Lyudmila Talabayeva is under personal sanctions introduced by the European Union, the United Kingdom, the United States, Canada, Switzerland, Australia, Ukraine, New Zealand, for ratifying the decisions of the "Treaty of Friendship, Cooperation and Mutual Assistance between the Russian Federation and the Donetsk People's Republic and between the Russian Federation and the Luhansk People's Republic" and providing political and economic support for Russia's annexation of Ukrainian territories.
