= Nikolai Stasenko =

Belarusian ice hockey player

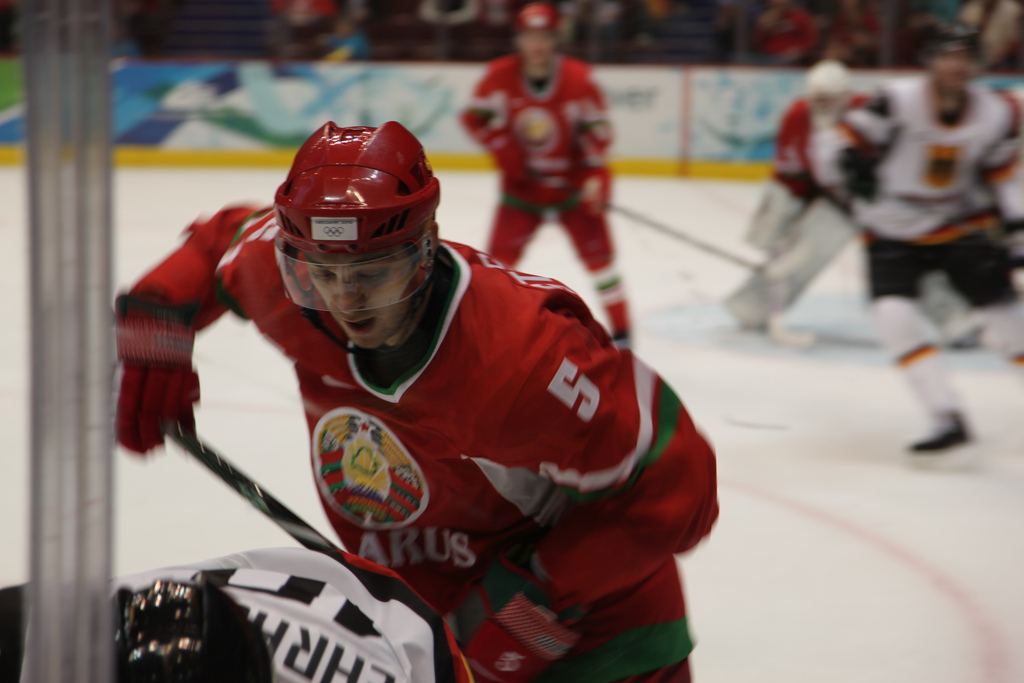
- Stasenko during the 2010 Winter Olympics
- Born: 15 February 1987 (age 39) Roshchino, Russian SFSR, Soviet Union
- Height: 6 ft 5 in (196 cm)
- Weight: 209 lb (95 kg; 14 st 13 lb)
- Position: Defence
- Shoots: Left
- KHL team Former teams: Free Agent; Yunost Minsk; Amur Khabarovsk; Severstal Cherepovets; HC Vityaz; Avtomobilist Yekaterinburg
- National team: Belarus
- Playing career: 2003–present

Nikolai Aleksandrovich Stasenko (Russian: Николай Александрович Стасенко; born 15 February 1987) is a Belarusian professional ice hockey defenceman. He is currently an unrestricted free agent who most recently played for Avtomobilist Yekaterinburg of the Kontinental Hockey League (KHL).

Stasenko played for Belarus at the 2010 Winter Olympics. He has also participated in several World Championships.

== Career statistics ==
=== Regular season and playoffs ===
			Regular season					Playoffs
Season	Team	League	GP	G	A	Pts	PIM	GP	G	A	Pts	PIM
2003–04	CSKA–2 Moscow	RUS.3	1	0	0	0	0	—	—	—	—	—
2004–05	Yunost Minsk	BLR	3	0	0	0	0	—	—	—	—	—
2004–05	Yunior Minsk	BLR.2	28	3	7	10	73	—	—	—	—	—
2005–06	Yunost Minsk	BLR	39	0	1	1	18	—	—	—	—	—
2005–06	Yunior Minsk	BLR.2	24	2	9	11	59	—	—	—	—	—
2006–07	Yunost Minsk	BLR	38	1	2	3	76	8	0	0	0	27
2006–07	Yunior Minsk	BLR.2	8	0	1	1	4	—	—	—	—	—
2007–08	Yunost Minsk	BLR	46	2	5	7	82	10	0	1	1	45
2007–08	Yunior Minsk	BLR.2	3	0	0	0	4	—	—	—	—	—
2008–09	Yunost Minsk	BLR	36	6	21	27	55	13	3	3	6	24
2008–09	Yunior Minsk	BLR.2	3	2	0	2	4	—	—	—	—	—
2009–10	Amur Khabarovsk	KHL	34	0	6	6	66	—	—	—	—	—
2010–11	Amur Khabarovsk	KHL	31	0	1	1	27	—	—	—	—	—
2011–12	Severstal Cherepovets	KHL	17	0	1	1	2	—	—	—	—	—
2012–13	Severstal Cherepovets	KHL	33	0	2	2	12	—	—	—	—	—
2013–14	Severstal Cherepovets	KHL	52	0	5	5	59	—	—	—	—	—
2014–15	Severstal Cherepovets	KHL	58	4	3	7	58	—	—	—	—	—
2015–16	Severstal Cherepovets	KHL	29	2	2	4	62	—	—	—	—	—
2016–17	Severstal Cherepovets	KHL	57	2	8	10	48	—	—	—	—	—
2017–18	Severstal Cherepovets	KHL	33	2	4	6	18	3	0	1	1	12
2018–19	HC Vityaz	KHL	55	1	9	10	36	4	0	0	0	4
2019–20	HC Vityaz	KHL	10	0	1	1	16	—	—	—	—	—
2019–20	Avtomobilist Yekaterinburg	KHL	8	0	0	0	6	—	—	—	—	—
2020–21	HC Dynama–Maladzechna	BLR	25	0	5	5	33	—	—	—	—	—
2021–22	TH Unia Oświęcim	POL	18	1	5	6	20	15	0	3	3	6
BLR totals			187	9	34	43	264	31	3	4	7	96
KHL totals			417	11	42	53	410	8	0	1	1	16

=== International ===
Year	Team	Event	GP	G	A	Pts	PIM
2007	Belarus	WJC	6	0	0	0	25
2010	Belarus	OG	4	0	3	3	2
2010	Belarus	WC	6	0	1	1	4
2011	Belarus	WC	6	0	1	1	0
2012	Belarus	WC	7	0	0	0	10
2013	Belarus	OGQ	3	0	0	0	0
2014	Belarus	WC	6	1	1	2	27
2015	Belarus	WC	8	0	0	0	0
2016	Belarus	OGQ	3	0	0	0	0
Junior totals			6	0	0	0	25
Senior totals			43	1	6	7	43
