= Stefan Tyszkiewicz =

Polish noble, inventor, and activist (1894–1976)

Stefan Eugeniusz Tyszkiewicz
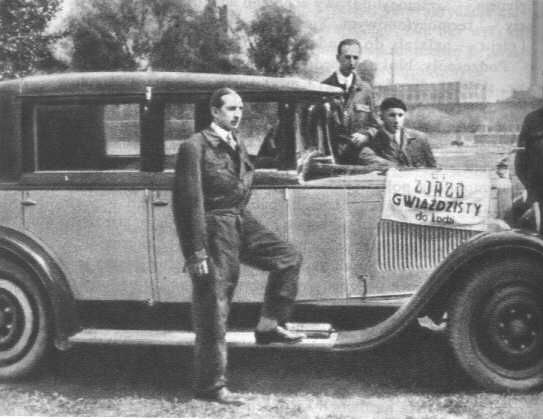
- Stefan Tyszkiewicz with his creation in the company of mechanics, 1926
- Born: 24 November 1894; Warsaw, Congress Poland, Russian Empire
- Died: 6 February 1976 (aged 81); London, United Kingdom
- Known for: car design and manufacturing, electronic devices
- Awards: Grand Prix Brussels World's Fair 1958; Order of St. George (Russia) 1915; Virtuti Militari (Poland)
- Scientific career
- Fields: mechanical engineering, aerospace
- Workplaces: Stetysz, 1st Krechowce Uhlan Regiment, Polish Red Cross, Sovereign Military Order of Malta

Tyszkiewicz Family Crest
- Leliwa coat of arms.
- Current region: Poland, Ukraine, Belarus, Lithuania
- Connected families: House of Lubomirski, Princess Anastasia of Montenegro, Leuchtenberg, House of Savoy-Carignano
- Distinctions: Knight of Malta
- Estate: Landwarów

Stefan Eugeniusz Tyszkiewicz, in Polish, Stefan Eugeniusz Maria Tyszkiewicz-Łohojski z Landwarowa, Leliwa coat of arms, (born 24 November 1894 in Warsaw, died 6 February 1976 in London) was a member of the Polish nobility, landowner, engineer, inventor and an early pioneer of the Polish automotive industry. He was a decorated veteran of both World Wars and the Polish–Bolshevik War and social activist. After 1945, he became an exile, turned to publishing and politics as a member of the National Council of Poland in London. He was an internationally feted inventor to the end of his life.

== Background ==
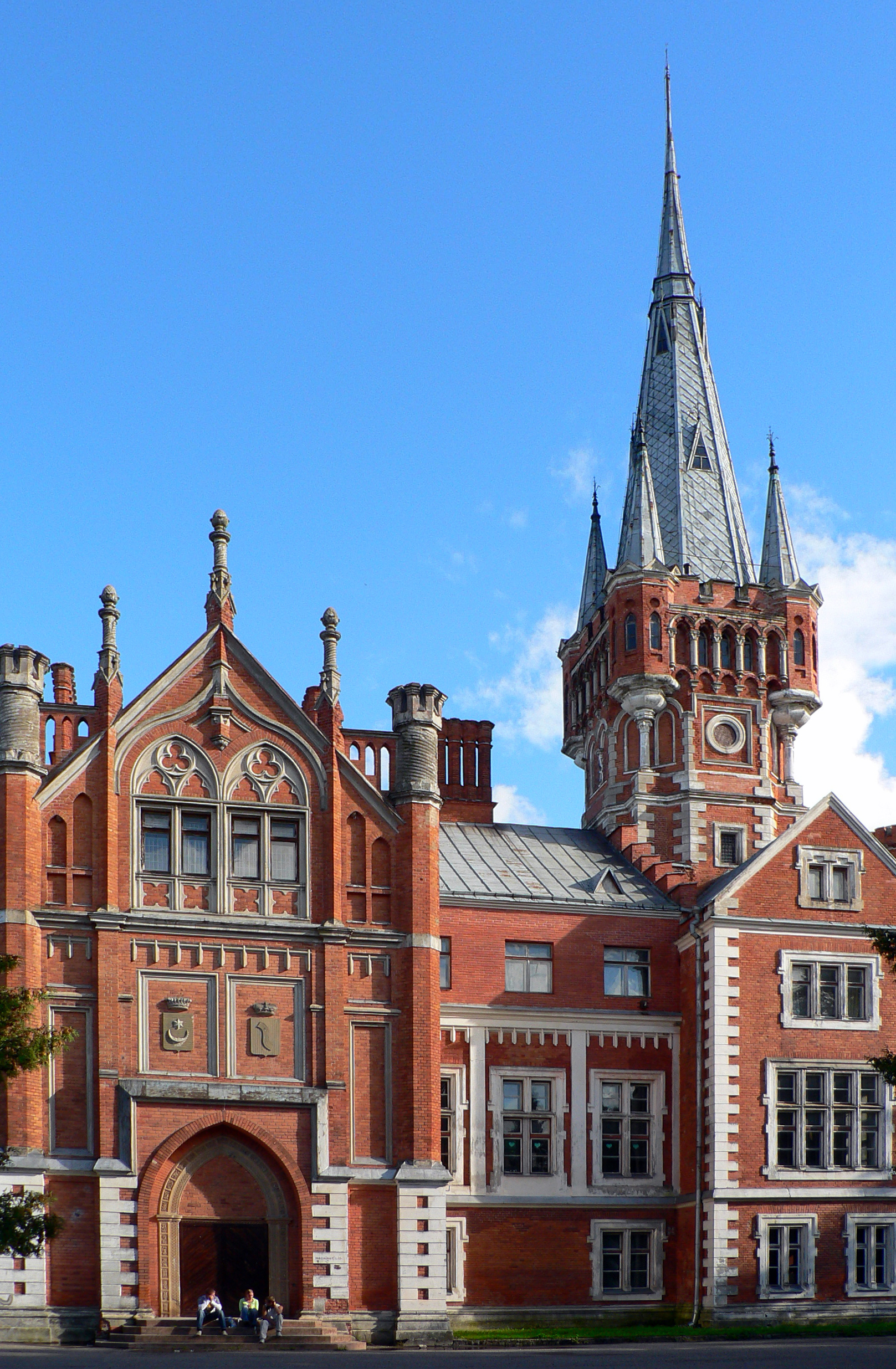
Lentvaris Manor, Lithuania

Stefan was the first born son, and second child of four, of Count Władysław Tyszkiewicz and his wife, Princess Krystyna Maria Lubomirska. The family were not merely members of the nobility, but had been magnates, and Stefan was to be the final heir to the Lentvaris Manor in Lithuania. His older sister, Zofia Róża, was famed as a great beauty and married Count Klemens Potocki. Already in childhood, Stefan showed a remarkable aptitude for technology. At the age of 14 years, he managed to gain a professional driving permit in Milan. In 1911, at only 17, he took out patents for two heating systems, one for cars, the other for flying machines. In 1913 he began undergraduate studies in engineering at Oxford University.

=== World War I and the Russian Revolution ===
He was in Poland, during his first summer vacation from Oxford, when World War I was declared. He was never to return to the dreaming spires, but volunteered instead for the Russian branch of the International Red Cross. For conspicuous bravery in saving, under fire, seven gravely injured soldiers, he was awarded the Order of St. George. In 1915 he was conscripted into the army. He passed out of the Page Corps in St Petersburg. From late 1916 he was adjutant to Gen. Grand Duke Nikolay Romanov, commander-in-chief of the Caucasus Army. He met the step-daughter of Grand Duke Nikolay, who was herself related to several royal houses of Europe, Princess Elena of Leuchtenberg (1892–1971). She was the daughter of George Maximilianovich, 6th Duke of Leuchtenberg and Princess Anastasia of Montenegro. They married in Yalta in July 1917. The couple had one surviving child, Countess Natalia Tyszkiewicz (1921–2003), who was to spend much of her later life in Switzerland.

Tyszkiewicz and his wife were in Crimea at the outbreak of the October Revolution. Stefan was able to help many of his countrymen to leave there and return to Poland. He himself left the peninsula with his wife aboard a British ship along with other members of the extended Russian royal family, after King George V was able to prevail upon the then resistant British prime minister, Lloyd George, to rescue them.

=== 1920s ===
After a brief stay in Italy, the Tyszkiewicz returned to their Lentvaris Manor in 1919. Shortly after, the Polish–Bolshevik war broke out and Tyszkiewicz volunteered for the cavalry in the Vilnius Region. In 1921 as a delegate of the Chief-of-staff of the Polish Army, he took part in the League of Nations commission charged with defining the new Polish–Lithuanian frontier. Following the birth of his daughter, Tyszkiewicz left for Paris to resume his academic studies interrupted seven years earlier at Oxford. In 1921 he was admitted to the École des Sciences Politiques for a politics degree and simultaneously attended lectures at the Ecole centrale des arts et manufactures on automotive technology.

== Ralf Stetysz ==
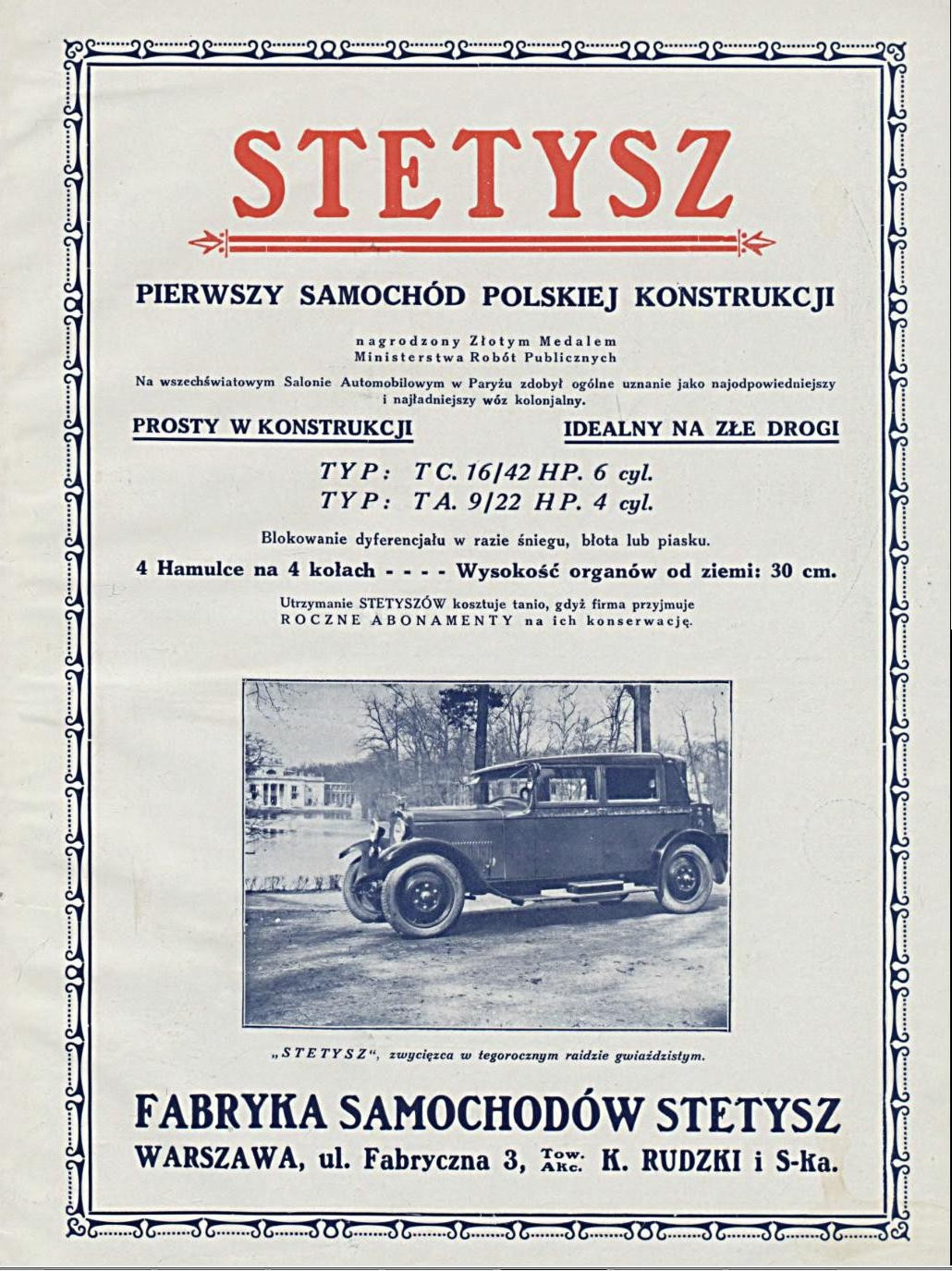
Advert for the Stetysz car from 1928.

In 1924 he began working on a project to design a car with the idea of developing motorised road transport in Poland. He founded a partnership for the purpose in Boulogne-Billancourt, a Paris suburb. He named it Automobiles Ralf Stetysz (a contraction of his name with the acronym in Polish of: Rolniczo Automobilowo-Lotnicza Fabryka Stefana Tyszkiewicza, translating as: the 'Agricultural-Aero-Automotive Factory of Stefan Tyszkiewicz'). His prototype vehicle used an American engine of the Continental Motors Company. The aim was to construct an all terrain passenger carrier adapted to a very poor road infra-structure and easy to maintain and repair. In 1925 he succeeded in producing two models:

- The model TC with a 6-cylinder engine of 2760 cm³ capacity and 42 horsepower
- The model TA with a 4-cylinder engine of 1500 cm³ capacity and 20 horsepower.

The car was exhibited at both the 1926 and 1927 international Paris Car Show, where it gained the reputation of a good quality 'Colonial' car. It also met with success at Polish sporting and trial events and it participated in the 1929 Eighth Monte Carlo Rally when it won recognition and a prize for comfort and its adaptability for long-distance travel. In 1928 production was transferred to Warsaw, to an existing factory, 'K. Rudzki & S-ka'. The car-bodies were manufactured by the aero specialist, Plage & Laskiewicz of Lublin. In moving the operation to Poland, Tyszkiewicz had to place his entire family fortune as collateral. In support, his wife parted with her own family heirloom, an 86 carat emerald brooch, which had once belonged to Catherine the Great.

On 11 February 1929, the Warsaw factory was destroyed by fire. Six completed cars were lost and 27 nearing completion. One or two were saved. Tyszkiewicz intended to restart production at his estate in Lentvaris, but failed to convince the shareholders of the 'Stetysz' company. In all, 200 Ralf Stetysz vehicles had been produced. So after the fire, Tyszkiewicz resigned himself to importing Mercedes-Benz and Fiat cars into Poland. He co-founded the 'Road League' – 'Liga Drogowa', and became its president in 1933. He also wrote about Motorisation in Poland.

== World War II ==
The outbreak of war in 1939 found him and his family on the territory of the Lithuanian republic, where he was involved in converting petrol engines into gas-powered ones, owing to the petrol shortage. Thanks to his contacts with the Italian legation in Lithuania, he helped Poles escape the conflict. After the occupation of Lithuania by the Soviet Union in June 1940, Tyszkiewicz was arrested and taken to Moscow where he was invited to collaborate with the NKVD, an offer he rejected requesting instead a laissez-passer to Italy. He was released from Lubianka Prison in October 1941 and made his way to the General Anders' army being formed then in preparation for a mass exodus from the USSR. He was appointed officer-in-charge of the motorised unit of the Polish 2nd Corps. Having traversed into Iran, thence to Palestine and Egypt, as a Rotmistrz – captain – in the 1st Krechowce Uhlan Regiment and as Communications Officer, (or personal adjutant) to gen. Anders, in 1944 he was especially useful connecting with Italian units fighting on the Allied side. During the Italian campaign he was director of the Red Cross in Anders' Army. During the buildup to the Battle of Monte Cassino, he invented a mechanism for discovering and destroying non-magnetic anti-personnel mines. His regiment was awarded the Virtuti Militari Order.

== Post-War years ==
Having reached the UK with Anders' army after the cessation of hostilities, Tyszkiewicz settled in London. In 1949, with Stanisław Mackiewicz he published a weekly entitled, Lwów i Wilno – 'Lviv and Vilnius', a campaigning publication following the Soviet annexation of these two ethnically diverse cities in the Second Polish Republic and the displacement of hundreds of thousands of their residents, some of whom had found refuge in Britain. His war time alliances drew him to the Poles settled in the UK, but his wife preferred to live in Rome where he visited often. Meanwhile, his daughter chose to live in Geneva and Broż reports that when they met, they conversed in Russian. The family had a villa in Antibes.

In the 1950s Tyszkiewicz did a stint in Turin working for Fiat, after which he concentrated on electronics. He took out a number of new patents, for example, 'stenovox', an early recording device, later improved as the 'Stetyphone'. Both inventions earned him the Grand Prix at the Brussels World's Fair in 1958. He also worked on Power assisted steering. He went on to design a wheel-chair, which thanks to an automatically variable axle length, could go up and down stairs, including escalators. Another patented invention was a luggage trolley very like the ones that are ubiquitous in contemporary airports. For these devices he was awarded gold medals at the inventors' fairs in Geneva in 1972 and New York in 1973. He designed an industrial stapler that was noted in Brussels in 1965 and in Geneva in 1972. His improvements to fuel efficiency in combustion engines, the 'Stetair', was rewarded at the Geneva Motor Show in 1974.

Tyszkiewicz had a long-standing interest in aeronautics and collaborated with the former European Launcher Development Organisation, on load-bearing rockets, and was later connected to the European Space Research Organisation and European Space Agency projects.

He belonged to the Polish National Council. which advised the Polish Government in exile. He was a Knight of Malta and was elected on three occasions to its Grand Council. Stefan Tyszkiewicz died in London in 1976 and was buried in the family plot at London's Brompton Cemetery.

== See also ==
- Karol Anders
- List of Poles
- Sovereign Military Order of Malta

== Bibliography ==
- Kaczorowski B., ed. (2008). "Stefan Tyszkiewicz". Wielkie biografie. 3, Odkrywcy, wynalazcy, uczeni. Warsaw: Wydawnictwo Naukowe PWN. pp. 620–621. ISBN 9788301151089.
- Narkowicz Liliana (2013). Tyszkiewiczowie rodem z Landwarowa. Warsaw: Neriton. ISBN 978-83-7543-304-3.
