= Novopokrovka, Primorsky Krai =

Rural locality in Primorsky Krai, Russia

Novopokrovka Новопокровка
- Rural locality
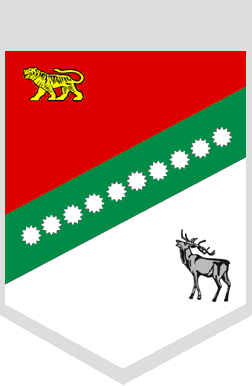
- Coat of arms
- Interactive map of Novopokrovka
- Location of Novopokrovka Novopokrovka (Primorsky Krai)
- Coordinates: 45°51′05″N 134°29′20″E
- Country: Russia
- Federal subject: Primorsky Krai

Population (2010 Census)
  - Total: 3,646
  - Estimate (2021): 3,095 (−15.1%)
- Time zone: UTC+10 (MSK+7)
- Postal code: 692844
- OKTMO ID: 05614428101

Novopokrovka (Russian: Новопокровка) is a rural locality (a selo) and the administrative center of Krasnoarmeysky District of Primorsky Krai, Russia, located in the west of the district on the Bolshaya Ussurka River, 365 kilometers (227 mi) north-northeast of Vladivostok (in a straight line). Population: 3,646 (2010 census); 4,042 (2002 census); 4,394 (1989 Soviet census).

== History ==
It was founded in 1903.
