= Salsky (rural locality) =

Salsky (Russian: Сальский; masculine), Salskaya (Сальская; feminine), or Salskoye (Сальское; neuter) is the name of several rural localities in Russia.

== Modern localities ==
- Salskoye, Kaliningrad Oblast, a settlement in Kovrovsky Rural Okrug of Zelenogradsky District in Kaliningrad Oblast
- Salskoye, Primorsky Krai, a selo in Dalnerechensky District of Primorsky Krai

== Alternative names ==
- Salskaya, alternative name of Salyn Tugtun, a settlement in Salyntugtunskaya Rural Administration of Sarpinsky District in the Republic of Kalmykia; 47°31′N 43°53′E
