= Malinovka (Primorsky Krai) =

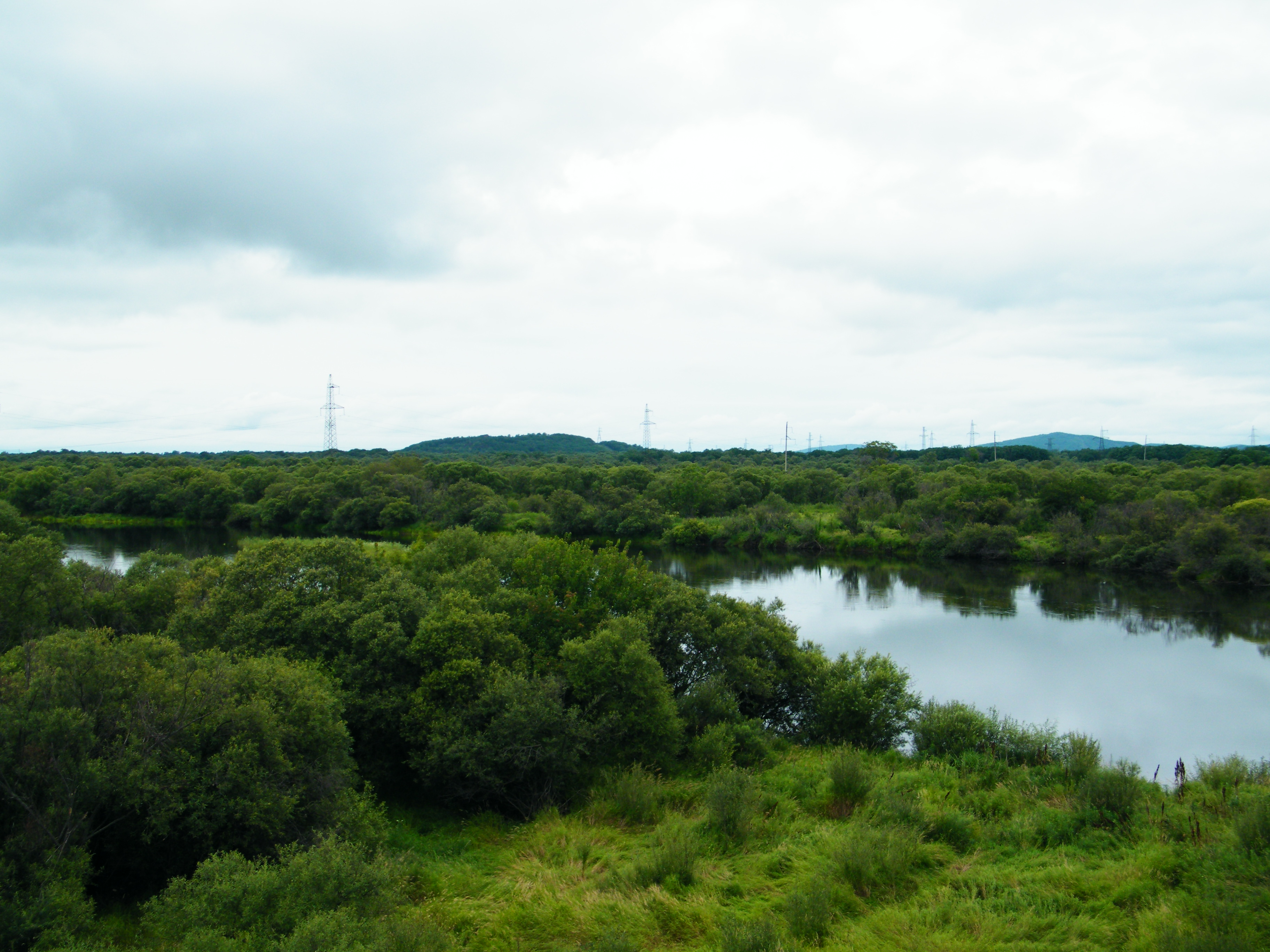

Location
- Country: Russia
- Region: Primorsky Krai

Physical characteristics
- Mouth: Bolshaya Ussurka
  - coordinates: 45°57′01″N 133°45′49″E
- Length: 274 km (170 mi)
- Basin size: 6,490 km^{2} (2,510 sq mi)

Basin features
- Progression: Bolshaya Ussurka→ Ussuri→ Amur→ Sea of Okhotsk

The Malinovka (Russian: Малиновка, formerly Вака Vaka or Ваку Vaku) is a river in Primorsky Krai, Russia, a left tributary of the Bolshaya Ussurka.

The area of the Malinovka drainage basin is approximately 6,490 square kilometres (2,510 mi^{2}). The river is 274 kilometres (170 mi) long. The average depth of the river is 0.8 to 2.0 metres (2.6 to 6.6 ft). The difference in elevation from source to mouth is 784 metres.

There are three hydrologic posts on the river near villages Ariadnoye, Rakitnoye and Vedenka. The longest tributary of the Malinovka is the Orekhovka, 80 kilometres (50 mi) long.
