= Armu (river) =

- Location of mouth

Location
- Country: Russia
- Region: Primorsky Krai

Physical characteristics
- Mouth: Bolshaya Ussurka
  - coordinates: 45°45′47″N 135°28′02″E
- Length: 201 km (125 mi)
- Basin size: 5,424 km^{2} (2,094 sq mi)

Basin features
- Progression: Bolshaya Ussurka→ Ussuri→ Amur→ Sea of Okhotsk

The Armu (Russian: Арму) is a river in Primorsky Krai, in the Russian Far East. It is a tributary of the Bolshaya Ussurka.

It is 201 kilometres (125 mi) long. The river's drainage basin covers about 5,424 square kilometres (2,094 mi^{2}). The longest tributary of the Armu is the Obilnaya, 101 kilometres (63 mi) long.

The river is a popular place of tourism and fishing. A brand of vodka has been named after it.
