= Dalnerechensk =

Town in Primorsky Krai, Russia

Dalnerechensk Дальнереченск
- Town
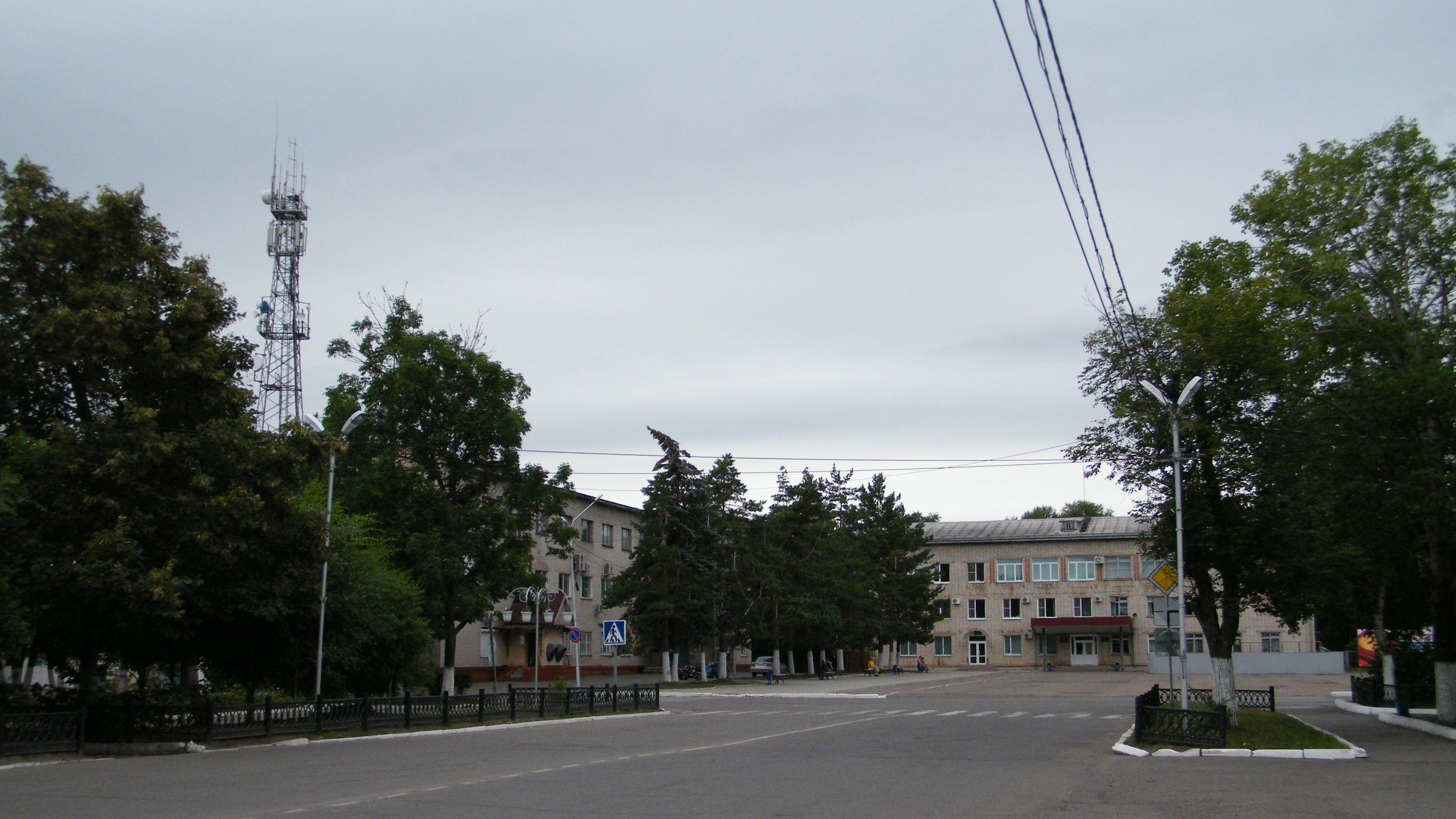
- Administration building in Dalnerechensk

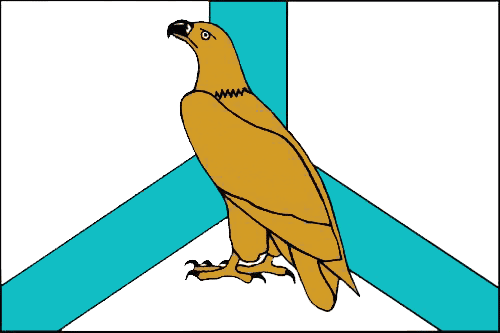
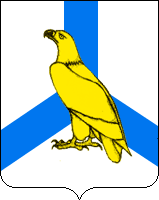
- Flag Coat of arms
- Interactive map of Dalnerechensk
- Location of Dalnerechensk Dalnerechensk (Primorsky Krai)
- Coordinates: 45°56′N 133°44′E
- Country: Russia
- Federal subject: Primorsky Krai
- Founded: 1859
- Town status since: 1917
- Elevation: 160 m (520 ft)

Population (2010 Census)
  - Total: 27,604
  - Estimate (2023): 23,028 (−16.6%)

Administrative status
  - Subordinated to: Dalnerechensk Town Under Krai Jurisdiction
  - Capital of: Dalnerechensk Town Under Krai Jurisdiction, Dalnerechensky District

Municipal status
  - Urban okrug: Dalnerechensky Urban Okrug
  - Capital of: Dalnerechensky Urban Okrug, Dalnerechensky Municipal District
- Time zone: UTC+10 (MSK+7)
- Postal codes: 692102, 692105, 692107, 692108, 692127, 692129–692133, 692135, 692136, 692138, 692139
- Dialing code: +7 42356
- OKTMO ID: 05708000001
- Website: dalnerokrug.ru

Dalnerechensk (Russian: Дальнере́ченск) is a town in Primorsky Krai, Russia. Population: 27,604 (2010 census); 30,092 (2002 census); 33,596 (1989 Soviet census).

It was previously known as Iman (until 1972).

== Names ==
It was originally known as Iman (Russian: Има́н; Chinese: 伊曼; pinyin: Yīmàn), but its Russian name was changed to Dalnerechensk (literally, a place at a remote river) in 1972 during a general campaign of cleansing the Chinese-derived toponyms in the Russian Far East. In Chinese, the name "Yiman" continues to be used.

== Geography ==
The town is located on the left bank of the Bolshaya Ussurka River, near its mouth in the Ussuri River which here forms the border between Russia and China. The Chinese border is about 5 kilometers (3.1 mi) from the town center. The town is also situated on the Malinovka River, which joins with the Bolshaya Ussurska within the town limits.

One can see the spurs of the Sikhote-Alin ranges from any point of the town in clear weather. Salskaya Hill, an extinct volcano on the banks of the Bolshaya Ussurka, is also situated close to the town. Closeness of the taiga and the mineral springs, Lastochka and Shmakovka, numerous lakes and rivers, an abundance of sunny days, and a quiet measured life of the town make Dalnerechensk a local tourist attraction.

== History ==
It was founded by the Cossacks in 1859 as the stanitsa of Grafskaya (Гра́фская). A railway station was built later in conjunction with the construction of the railway between Khabarovsk and Vladivostok; now the eastern section of the Trans-Siberian Railway. The railway station and settlement were later named after the Iman River. The settlement quickly became a timber center due to the large pine, fir, and spruce trees in the area, and was granted town status in 1917.

The town was heavily damaged during the Russian Civil War. In May 1920, Sergey Lazo, Alexey Lutsky, and Vsevolod Sibirtsev—three Bolsheviks taken prisoner by Japanese intervention troops after the Nikolayevsk Incident—were murdered by the White Army Cossacks at the Muravyovo-Amurskaya railway station near the town. This event was greatly expanded by the Soviet propaganda of later years; allegedly the three were burned alive in the firebox of a steam locomotive. The village and station at Muravyovo were renamed Lazo, as were a number of other places and streets in the krai.

The majority of the monuments in the town are devoted to the events of the Russian Civil War of 1918-1922 and World War II.

In the early 1930s it was planned to build the Vladivostok-Khabarovsk highway, with a hard (gravel) surface, 600 kilometers long. Construction plans were announced at the 17th Congress of the All-Union Communist Party (Bolsheviks), held in Moscow from January 26 to February 10, 1934, when the Second Five Year Plan was adopted. Therefore the Red Army formed two brigades of road troops from December 1933 to January 1934. The headquarters of the first brigade was the village of Dmitrievka, Primorsky Region, the second is the city of Khabarovsk. The first brigade was building from Vladivostok to Iman, and the second - from Iman to Khabarovsk.

There is a memorial in the town where frontier-guards who died in 1969 during the Sino-Soviet border conflict on Damansky Island are buried. Sino-Soviet tensions following this event led to a campaign of changing Chinese-derived place names in the region, with the town being renamed Dalnerechensk in 1972.

== Administrative and municipal status ==
Within the framework of administrative divisions, Dalnerechensk serves as the administrative center of Dalnerechensky District, even though it is not a part of it. As an administrative division, it is, together with four rural localities, incorporated separately as Dalnerechensk Town Under Krai Jurisdiction—an administrative unit with the status equal to that of the districts. As a municipal division, Dalnerechensk Town Under Krai Jurisdiction is incorporated as Dalnerechensky Urban Okrug.

== Economy ==
The economy of the town is mainly represented by woodworking enterprises, such as JSC Les Export, JSC Primorsky DOK, JSC Dalnerechensky Lesokombinat, and others.

=== Transportation ===
The town has a station on the Trans-Siberian Railway, it is also connected by road to Vladivostok.

== Climate ==
Dalnerechensk has a humid continental climate (Köppen climate classification Dwb) with quite dry and very cold winters and very warm and wet summers. Mean annual temperature in the town is +1.5 °C (34.7 °F). Temperature in July is +20.7 °C (69.3 °F) and in January it is −17.7 °C (0.1 °F).

Climate data for Dalnerechensk
Month	Jan	Feb	Mar	Apr	May	Jun	Jul	Aug	Sep	Oct	Nov	Dec	Year
Record high °C (°F)	2.7 (36.9)	5.9 (42.6)	17.6 (63.7)	27.8 (82.0)	32.9 (91.2)	34.9 (94.8)	34.6 (94.3)	36.8 (98.2)	30.0 (86.0)	26.5 (79.7)	18.9 (66.0)	8.8 (47.8)	36.8 (98.2)
Mean daily maximum °C (°F)	−14.4 (6.1)	−9.6 (14.7)	−0.4 (31.3)	11.4 (52.5)	19.2 (66.6)	23.7 (74.7)	26.7 (80.1)	25.8 (78.4)	20.2 (68.4)	12.1 (53.8)	−0.4 (31.3)	−11.3 (11.7)	8.6 (47.5)
Daily mean °C (°F)	−19.8 (−3.6)	−15.6 (3.9)	−6.1 (21.0)	5.0 (41.0)	12.5 (54.5)	17.7 (63.9)	21.2 (70.2)	20.4 (68.7)	13.9 (57.0)	5.5 (41.9)	−6.2 (20.8)	−16.6 (2.1)	2.7 (36.8)
Mean daily minimum °C (°F)	−24.8 (−12.6)	−21.3 (−6.3)	−11.6 (11.1)	−0.2 (31.6)	6.8 (44.2)	12.5 (54.5)	16.7 (62.1)	16.0 (60.8)	8.7 (47.7)	0.2 (32.4)	−11.1 (12.0)	−21.3 (−6.3)	−2.5 (27.6)
Record low °C (°F)	−42.0 (−43.6)	−36.8 (−34.2)	−31.8 (−25.2)	−15.1 (4.8)	−3.7 (25.3)	2.1 (35.8)	5.3 (41.5)	4.4 (39.9)	−5.0 (23.0)	−16.2 (2.8)	−30.9 (−23.6)	−38.2 (−36.8)	−42.0 (−43.6)
Average precipitation mm (inches)	12.1 (0.48)	11.2 (0.44)	21.4 (0.84)	40.8 (1.61)	64.8 (2.55)	79.8 (3.14)	109.8 (4.32)	119.2 (4.69)	77.1 (3.04)	50.9 (2.00)	25.6 (1.01)	16.9 (0.67)	629.6 (24.79)
Average precipitation days (≥ 0.1 mm)	10.7	8.4	10.3	11.3	11.0	10.5	12.8	11.9	8.8	11.0	10.2	13.1	130
Average relative humidity (%)	74.2	69.8	64.6	61.7	63.9	73.5	80.8	81.5	75.5	66.2	69.2	73.9	71.2
Mean monthly sunshine hours	173.0	193.0	225.0	202.0	232.0	226.0	219.0	203.0	214.0	198.0	166.0	150.0	2,401
Source 1: climatebase.ru (1939-2012)
Source 2: NOAA (sun only, 1961-1990)

== Notable residents ==
- Sergei Shapovalov (born 1995), football player
