= Roshchino, Primorsky Krai =

Roshchino Рощино
- Interactive map of Roshchino
- Location of Roshchino Roshchino (Primorsky Krai)
- Coordinates: 45°54′40″N 134°53′20″E
- Country: Russia
- Federal subject: Primorsky Krai
- Administrative district: Krasnoarmeysky District
- Founded: 1931
- Current status since: 1957

Population (2010 Census)
  - Total: 3,919
  - Estimate (2021): 3,211 (−18.1%)

Municipal status
  - Municipal district: Krasnoarmeysky District
- Time zone: UTC+10 (MSK+7)
- Postal code: 692180
- Dialing code: +7 41136
- OKTMO ID: 05614431101
- Website: адм-рощино.рф

Roshchino (Russian: Рощино) is a village in Krasnoarmeysky District, Primorsky Krai, Russia. As of the 2010 Census, its population was 3919.
