= Ralf-Stetysz =

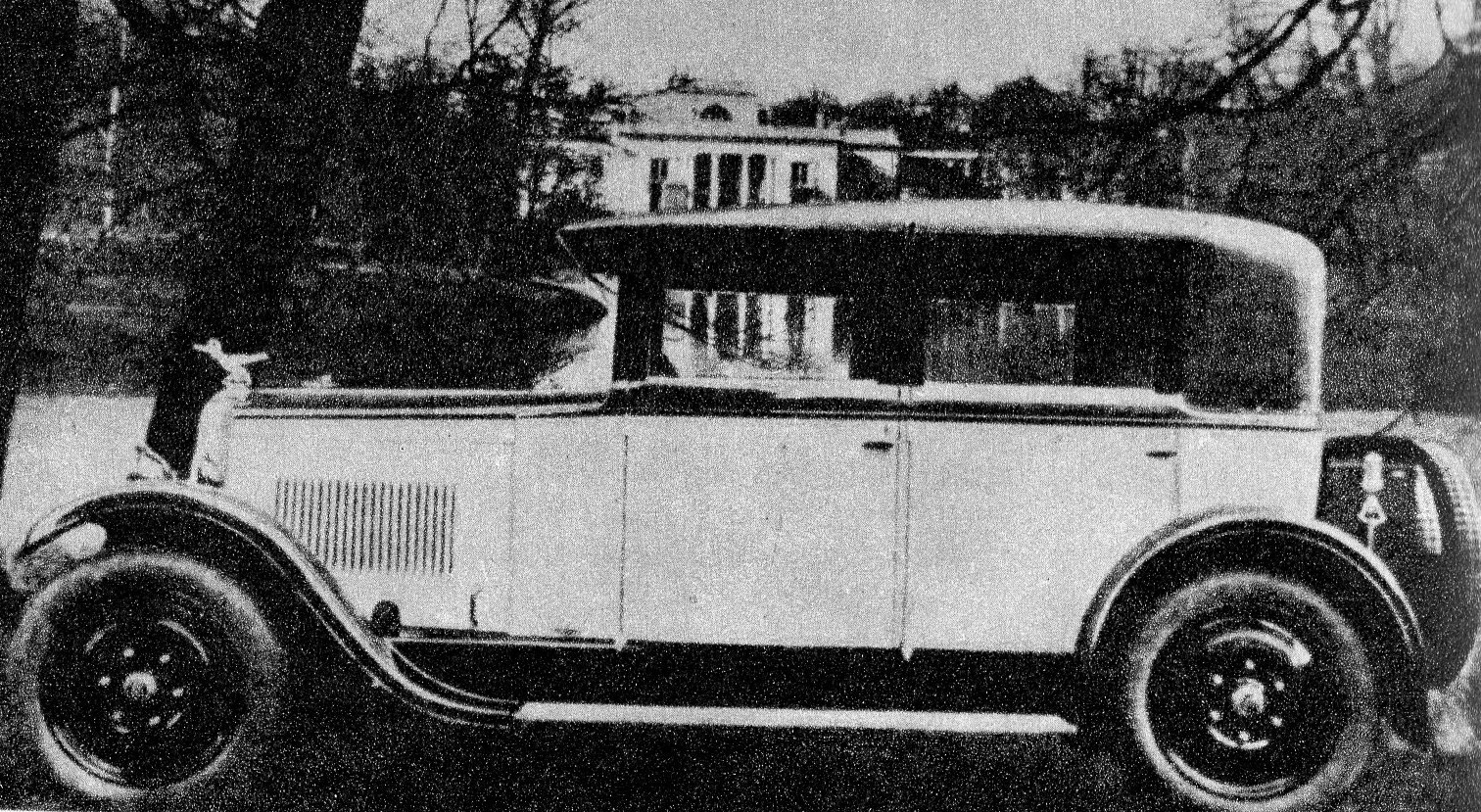
- 1928 Ralf-Stetysz

Overview
- Manufacturer: K. Rudzki i S-ka
- Also called: Stetysz
- Production: 1924–1929
- Assembly: Poland: Warsaw; France: Paris
- Designer: Stefan Tyszkiewicz

Powertrain
- Engine: R4 1500 cc R6 2760 cc

Ralf-Stetysz ([ˈralf stɛtɨʂ]) was the marque of one of the earliest Polish car manufacturers begun in France and transferred to Poland in the 1920s. It was formed in 1924, when Count Stefan Tyszkiewicz, an inventor and mechanical engineer, started a small automotive firm "Automobiles Ralf Stetysz" in Boulogne-Billancourt near Paris. The name was an acronym in Polish of the name "Rolniczo Automobilowo-Lotnicza Fabryka Stefana Tyszkiewicza" - "Agricultural-Automobile-Aero Factory of Stefan Tyszkiewicz").

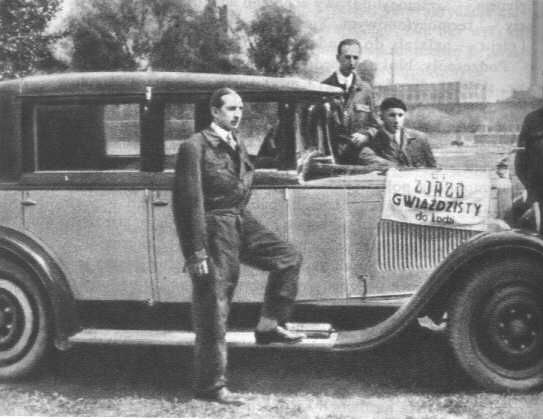
Stetysz car and Stefan Tyszkiewicz (1926)

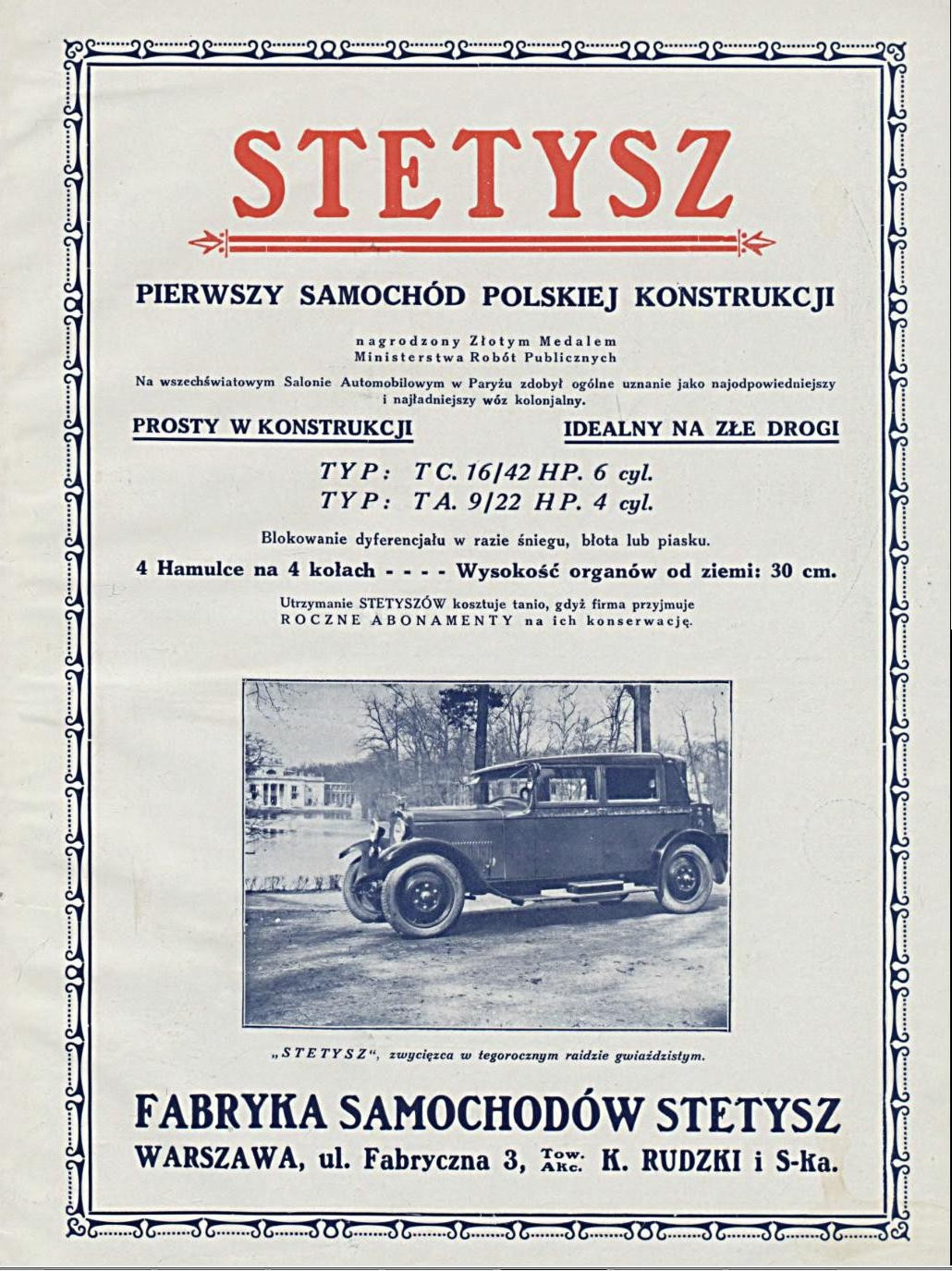
Advertising of Stetysz cars

Tyszkiewicz designed several prototypes, drawing heavily on contemporary French car designs, but better suited for the dismal Polish roads of the time. A single prototype was completed, with a strengthened suspension, a locking differential and a powerful Continental engine. It was presented at the 1926 and 1927 Paris Motor Show, where it received positive reviews as a good "colonial car". The prototype proved interesting and in 1927 Tyszkiewicz was able to secure cooperation with the Warsaw-based K. Rudzki i S-ka company to start serial production, under the Stetysz brand. The company produced all the mechanical parts and assembled the vehicles while the bodywork was manufactured by Plage i Laśkiewicz of Lublin, the aeronautical company.

Eventually, Ralf-Stetysz launched two models for the 1929 model year, both available in several configurations:

- Stetysz TA, with a 4-cylinder Continental engine of 1500 ccm displacement
- Stetysz TC, with a 6-cylinder Continental engine of 2760 ccm

The initial batch of roughly 200 cars of both models proved durable, and their sales looked promising. The cars were featured at the Poznań International Fair and marketed as "the first Polish-made car" and as a vehicle "ideal for bad roads". The car took part in numerous rallies, including the 1929 Monte Carlo Rally where it initially fared very well, arriving in Paris first. However, near Lyon, the co-driver was taken ill and had to be admitted to hospital, which cost so much time that the car was obliged to drop out of the race.

On 11 February 1929 the Stetysz Warsaw factory was completely gutted by fire, along with a number of already completed vehicles awaiting delivery. Tyszkiewicz wanted to rebuild the factory, but the move was blocked by shareholders of K. Rudzki & S-ka, a firm specialising primarily in bridge construction. Eventually, Stefan Tyszkiewicz resigned himself to discontinue his own brand and focused instead on importing and producing, under licence, FIAT and Mercedes models.

== Bibliography ==
- https://gallica.bnf.fr/ark:/12148/bpt6k605534p.texte Report on the car in the Paris daily, 'Le Petit Parisien'.
- "Automobilia". Toutes les voitures françaises 1927 (salon [Paris, Oct] 1926). Paris: Histoire & collections. Nr. 78s: Page 57. 2006.
