= Warszawianka =

Warszawianka may refer to:

- Warszawianka (1831), Polish patriotic song originally written in French as La Varsovienne in 1831
- Warszawianka (1905) or Whirlwinds of Danger, Polish revolutionary song originally written in Polish in 1879, popularized in Poland in 1905 and later in other countries
- Warszawianka, Masovian Voivodeship, a village
- KS Warszawianka, a Warsaw sports club, 1921–1971
- Project 636 Varshavyanka, an Improved Kilo class submarine
- Warszawianka (TV series), a 2023 Polish streaming television series
