= Bolshaya Ussurka =

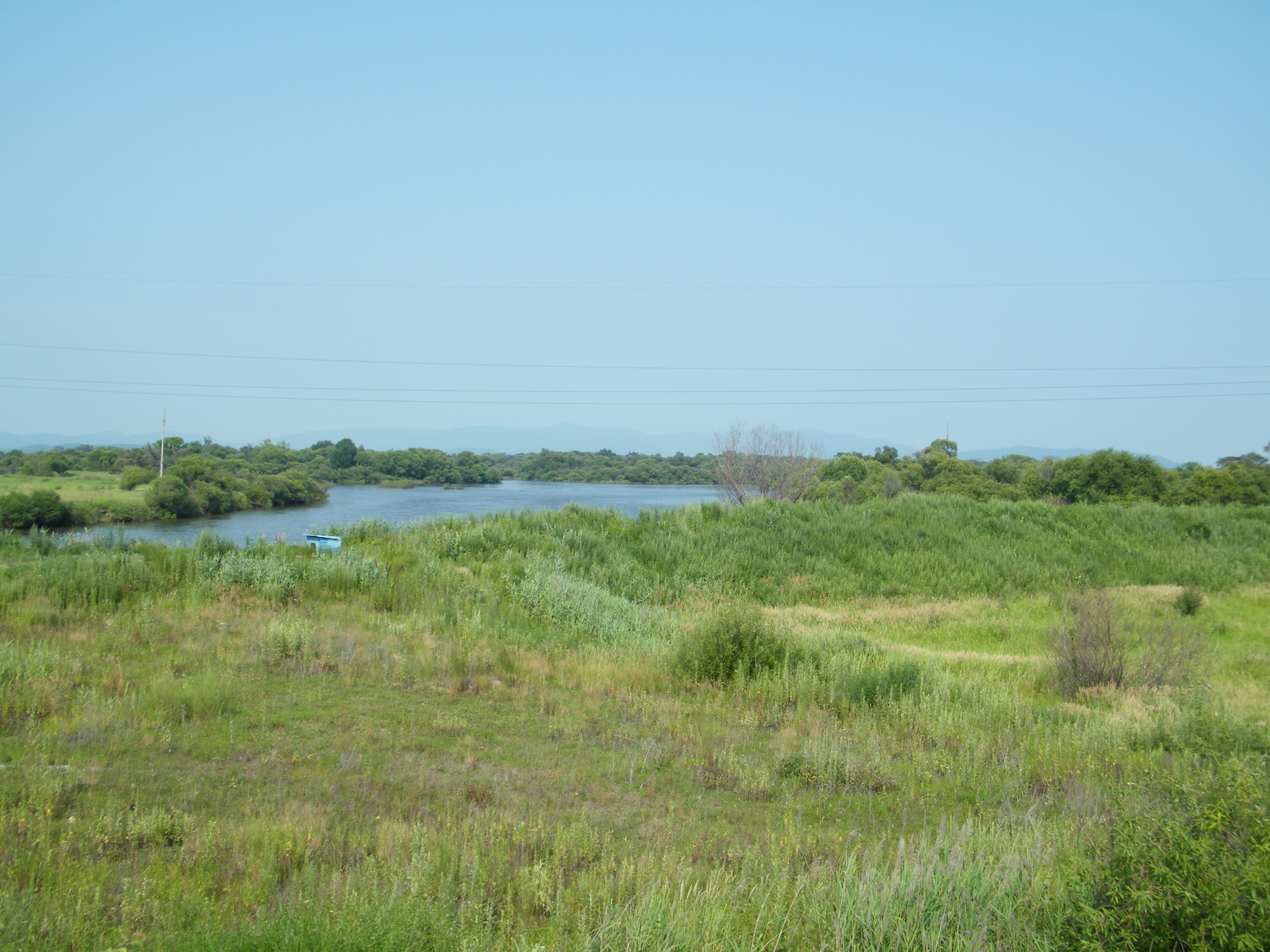

Location
- Country: Russia

Physical characteristics
- Mouth: Ussuri
  - coordinates: 45°58′24″N 133°40′28″E
- Length: 560 km (350 mi)
- Basin size: 22,300 km^{2} (8,600 sq mi)

Basin features
- Progression: Ussuri→ Amur→ Sea of Okhotsk

The Bolshaya Ussurka (Russian: Большая Уссурка, literally: "Great Ussuri") is a river in the Russian Far East in Primorsky Krai. It is a right tributary of the Ussuri, which it meets near Dalnerechensk, some 357 km from the mouth of the Ussuri.

The area of the Bolshaya Ussurka drainage basin is approximately 29,600 square kilometres (11,400 mi^{2}). It is 440 kilometres (270 mi) long. The river was known as "Iman" (Иман) until the 1972 Renaming of geographical sites in the Russian Far East.

The major tributaries of the Bolshaya Ussurka are the rivers Malinovka, Marevka, Naumovka and Armu.

Basin of the Amur
