= Dalnerechensky District =

Dalnerechensky District Дальнереченский район (Russian)
- District
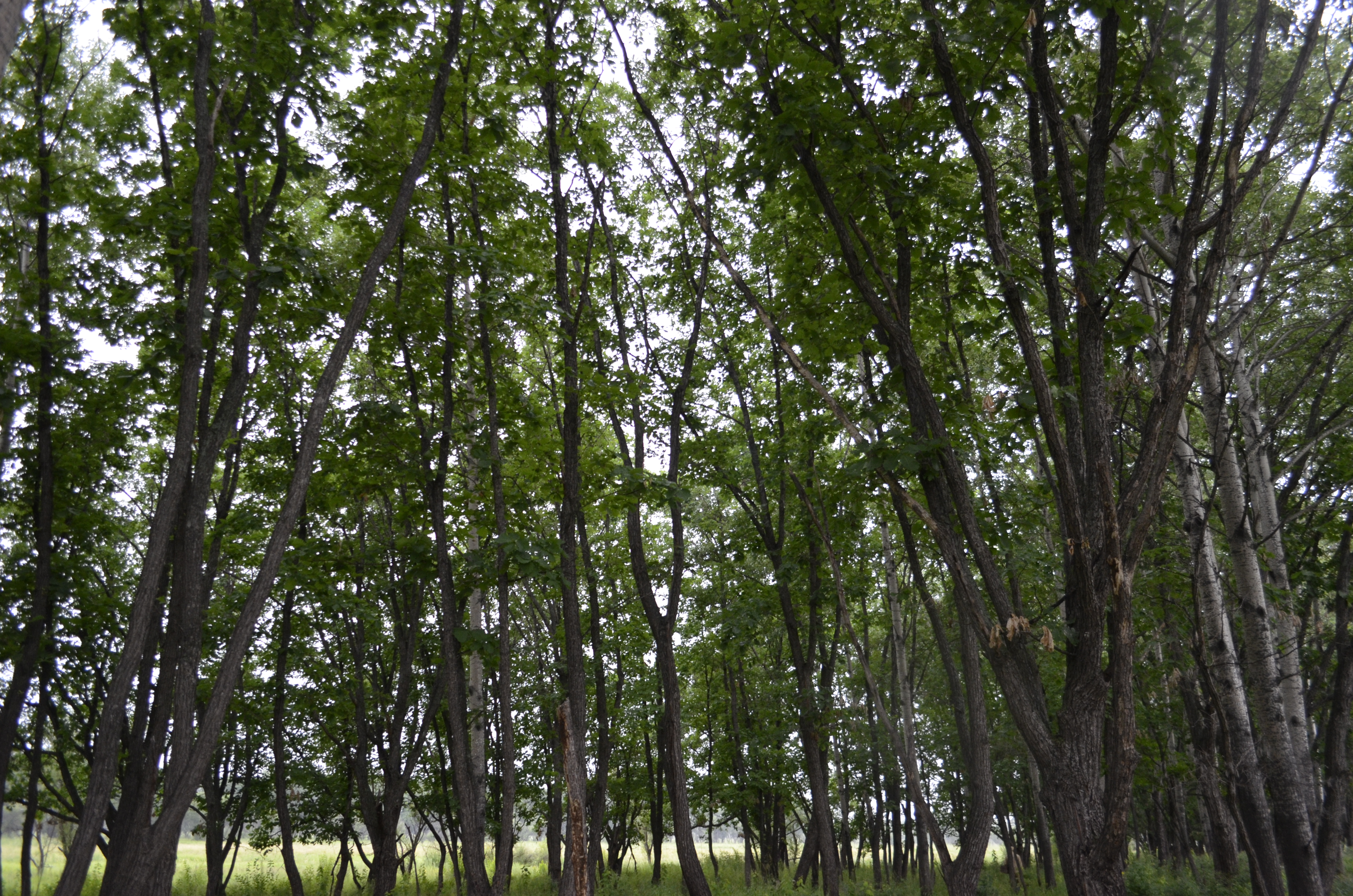
- Forest in Dalnerecensky District

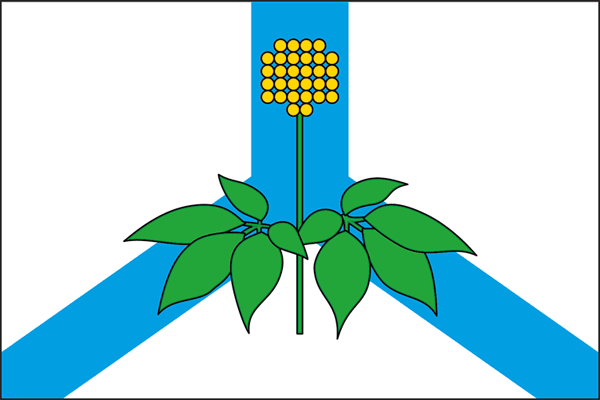
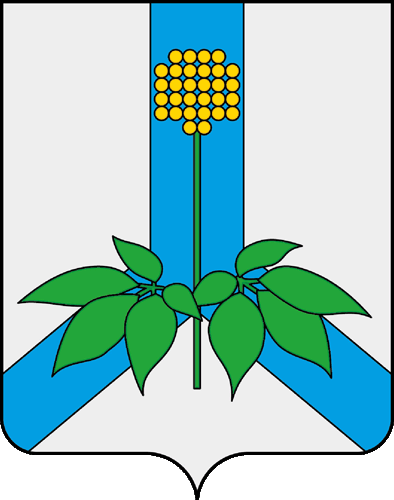
- Flag Coat of arms
- Location of Dalnerechensky District in Primorsky Krai
- Coordinates: 45°54′N 133°42′E
- Country: Russia
- Federal subject: Primorsky Krai
- Established: 1926
- Administrative center: Dalnerechensk

Area
  - Total: 7,235.53 km^{2} (2,793.65 sq mi)

Population (2010 Census)
  - Total: 11,344
  - Density: 1.5678/km^{2} (4.0606/sq mi)
  - Urban: 0%
  - Rural: 100%

Administrative structure
  - Inhabited localities: 30 rural localities

Municipal structure
  - Municipally incorporated as: Dalnerechensky Municipal District
  - Municipal divisions: 0 urban settlements, 6 rural settlements
- Time zone: UTC+10 (MSK+7)
- OKTMO ID: 05607000
- Website: http://mo.primorsky.ru/dalnerechensky/

Dalnerechensky District (Russian: Дальнере́ченский райо́н) is an administrative and municipal district (raion), one of the twenty-two in Primorsky Krai, Russia. It is located in the central and western parts of the krai. The area of the district is 7,235.53 square kilometers (2,793.65 sq mi). Its administrative center is the town of Dalnerechensk (which is not administratively a part of the district). Population: 11,344 (2010 census); 13,995 (2002 census); 17,057 (1989 Soviet census).

== History ==
The district was established in 1926 as Imansky District. It was renamed Dalnerechensky in 1972.

== Administrative and municipal status ==
Within the framework of administrative divisions, Dalnerechensky District is one of the twenty-two in the krai. The town of Dalnerechensk serves as its administrative center, despite being incorporated separately as a town under krai jurisdiction—an administrative unit with the status equal to that of the districts.

As a municipal division, the district is incorporated as Dalnerechensky Municipal District. Dalnerechensk Town Under Krai Jurisdiction is incorporated separately from the district as Dalnerechensky Urban Okrug.
