= Belarus at the 1998 Winter Olympics =

- IOC code: BLR
- NOC: Belarus Olympic Committee
- Website: www.noc.by (in Russian and English)

in Nagano
- Competitors: 59 (44 men, 15 women) in 9 sports
- Flag bearers: Alexandr Popov, Biathlon
- Medals Ranked 20th: Gold 0 Silver 0 Bronze 2 Total 2

Winter Olympics appearances (overview)
- 1994; 1998; 2002; 2006; 2010; 2014; 2018; 2022; 2026

Other related appearances
- Poland (1924–1936); Soviet Union (1952–1988); Unified Team (1992); Individual Neutral Athletes (2026)

Belarus competed at the 1998 Winter Olympics in Nagano, Japan.

== Medalists ==
Medal	Name	Sport	Event	Date
Bronze	Alexei Aidarov	Biathlon	Men's individual	11 February
Bronze	Dmitri Dashinski	Freestyle skiing	Men's aerials	18 February

== Competitors ==
The following is the list of number of competitors in the Games.

Sport	Men	Women	Total
Alpine skiing	1	0	1
Biathlon	4	5	9
Cross-country skiing	5	5	10
Figure skating	1	1	2
Freestyle skiing	5	1	6
Ice hockey	23	0	23
Nordic combined	2	–	2
Ski jumping	2	–	2
Speed skating	1	3	4
Total	44	15	59

== Alpine skiing ==
Men

Athlete	Event	Race 1	Race 2	Total	
Athlete	Event	Time	Time	Time	Rank
Igor Yudin	Super-G			1:45.92	36

== Biathlon ==
Men

Event	Athlete	Misses ^{1}	Time	Rank
10 km Sprint	Aleksandr Popov	2	30:53.0	55
10 km Sprint	Vadim Sashurin	1	30:34.0	46
10 km Sprint	Alexei Aidarov	2	30:12.3	37
10 km Sprint	Oleg Ryzhenkov	2	29:38.2	27

Event	Athlete	Time	Misses	Adjusted time ^{2}	Rank
20 km	Aleksandr Popov	57:39.6	3	1'00:39.6	29
20 km	Vadim Sashurin	57:08.6	2	59:08.6	13
20 km	Oleg Ryzhenkov	56:31.3	2	58:31.3	9
20 km	Alexei Aidarov	55:46.5	1	56:46.5	3rd place, bronze medalist(s)

Men's 4 × 7.5 km relay

Athletes	Race		
Athletes	Misses ^{1}	Time	Rank
Alexei Aidarov; Oleg Ryzhenkov; Aleksandr Popov; Vadim Sashurin	0	1'23:14.0	4

Women

Event	Athlete	Misses ^{1}	Time	Rank
7.5 km Sprint	Nataliya Ryzhenkova	4	26:10.5	52
7.5 km Sprint	Nataliya Moroz	0	25:04.7	28
7.5 km Sprint	Svetlana Paramygina	2	24:50.0	24
7.5 km Sprint	Irina Tananayko	0	24:42.5	22

Event	Athlete	Time	Misses	Adjusted time ^{2}	Rank
15 km	Nataliya Permyakova	58:33.5	3	1'01:33.5	41
15 km	Irina Tananayko	57:25.4	1	58:25.4	22
15 km	Nataliya Ryzhenkova	55:03.5	3	58:03.5	19
15 km	Svetlana Paramygina	54:53.4	2	56:53.4	12

Women's 4 × 7.5 km relay

Athletes	Race		
Athletes	Misses ^{1}	Time	Rank
Irina Tananayko; Nataliya Ryzhenkova; Nataliya Moroz; Svetlana Paramygina	0	1'45:24.0	12

^{1} A penalty loop of 150 metres had to be skied per missed target.
^{2} One minute added per missed target.

== Cross-country skiing ==
Men

Event	Athlete	Race	
Event	Athlete	Time	Rank
10 km C	Sergey Dolidovich	DNF	–
10 km C	Nikolay Semenyako	31:54.5	73
10 km C	Aleksey Tregubov	31:43.9	70
10 km C	Aleksandr Sannikov	29:54.7	39
15 km pursuit^{1} F	Aleksey Tregubov	DNF	–
15 km pursuit^{1} F	Nikolay Semenyako	49:31.3	60
15 km pursuit^{1} F	Aleksandr Sannikov	43:16.9	26
30 km C	Nikolay Semenyako	1'47:32.5	54
30 km C	Aleksandr Sannikov	1'42:48.0	40
30 km C	Sergey Dolidovich	1'42:18.7	36
30 km C	Aleksey Tregubov	1'40:05.9	18
50 km F	Vyacheslav Plaksunov	DNF	–
50 km F	Nikolay Semenyako	DNF	–
50 km F	Sergey Dolidovich	2'17:07.5	31
50 km F	Aleksandr Sannikov	2'16:34.4	27

^{1} Starting delay based on 10 km results.
C = Classical style, F = Freestyle

Men's 4 × 10 km relay

Athletes	Race	
Athletes	Time	Rank
Sergey Dolidovich; Aleksey Tregubov; Aleksandr Sannikov; Vyacheslav Plaksunov	1'45:15.3	14

Women

Event	Athlete	Race	
Event	Athlete	Time	Rank
5 km C	Lyudmila Korolik	20:17.9	63
5 km C	Irina Skripnik	19:44.2	55
5 km C	Svetlana Kamotskaya	19:32.7	48
5 km C	Yelena Sinkevich	18:50.2	23
10 km pursuit^{2} F	Lyudmila Korolik	34:55.4	58
10 km pursuit^{2} F	Irina Skripnik	34:15.8	55
10 km pursuit^{2} F	Svetlana Kamotskaya	33:11.2	47
10 km pursuit^{2} F	Yelena Sinkevich	30:42.5	21
15 km C	Irina Skripnik	52:26.2	43
15 km C	Yekaterina Antonyuk	52:24.5	42
15 km C	Svetlana Kamotskaya	51:59.0	39
15 km C	Yelena Sinkevich	49:20.8	15
30 km F	Irina Skripnik	1'34:38.4	47
30 km F	Lyudmila Korolik	1'34:07.5	44
30 km F	Svetlana Kamotskaya	1'33:51.6	42
30 km F	Yelena Sinkevich	1'27:15.3	12

^{2} Starting delay based on 5 km results.
C = Classical style, F = Freestyle

Women's 4 × 5 km relay

Athletes	Race	
Athletes	Time	Rank
Svetlana Kamotskaya; Yekaterina Antonyuk; Yelena Sinkevich; Lyudmila Korolik	59:56.9	14

== Figure skating ==
Ice Dancing

Athletes	CD1	CD2	OD	FD	TFP	Rank
Tatjana Navka; Nikolai Morozov	14	15	17	16	32.0	16

== Freestyle skiing ==
Men

Athlete	Event	Qualification			Final		
Athlete	Event	Time	Points	Rank	Time	Points	Rank
Oleg Kuleshov	Moguls	34.37	11.13	29	did not advance		
Aleksandr Tkachenko	Aerials		178.46	18	did not advance		
Vasily Vorobyov	Aerials		199.29	13	did not advance		
Aleksey Grishin	Aerials		217.84	9 Q		220.99	8
Dmitry Dashchinsky	Aerials		249.04	1 Q		240.79	3rd place, bronze medalist(s)

Women

Athlete	Event	Qualification			Final		
Athlete	Event	Time	Points	Rank	Time	Points	Rank
Yuliya Milko-Chernemorets	Moguls	35.91	20.20	19	did not advance		

== Ice hockey ==
=== Men's tournament ===
The Belarusian hockey team was put into the preliminaries for the Olympics. They won their group that featured Germany, France and Japan by beating France 4–0, Germany 8-2 and by drawing Japan 2-2. Their first place helped them to play in the final tournament. They were in group A and lost all 3 games 5–0 to Canada and identical scores of 5–2 to Sweden and the United States. They finished last of group A and had to face the top spot in group B which was Russia. They lost 4-1 and got eliminated in the process from the tournament. They ended the tournament in 7th place.

==== Preliminary round – group B ====
Top team (shaded) advanced to the first round.

Team	GP	W	L	T	GF	GA	GD	Pts
Belarus	3	2	0	1	14	4	+10	5
Germany	3	2	1	0	7	9	-2	4
France	3	1	2	0	5	8	-3	2
Japan	3	0	2	1	5	10	-5	1

All times are local (UTC-7).

7 February 1998	France	0 – 4 (0-1, 0-1, 0-2)	Belarus	The Big Hat/ Aqua Wing Arena, Nagano, Japan; Attendance: 3,419

9 February 1998	Germany	2 – 8 (0-2, 2-3, 0-3)	Belarus	The Big Hat/ Aqua Wing Arena, Nagano, Japan; Attendance: 8,063

10 February 1998	Japan	2 – 2 (1-1, 1-1, 0-0)	Belarus	The Big Hat/ Aqua Wing Arena, Nagano, Japan; Attendance: 3,659

==== First Round – group C ====
Team	GP	W	L	T	GF	GA	GD	Pts
Canada	3	3	0	0	12	3	+9	6
Sweden	3	2	1	0	11	7	+4	4
United States	3	1	2	0	8	10	-2	2
Belarus	3	0	3	0	4	15	-11	0

All times are local (UTC-7).

13 February 1998	Canada	5 – 0 (0-2, 0-2, 0-1)	Belarus	The Big Hat/ Aqua Wing Arena, Nagano, Japan; Attendance: 9,960

14 February 1998	United States	5 – 2 (2-1, 1-0, 2-1)	Belarus	The Big Hat/ Aqua Wing Arena, Nagano, Japan; Attendance: 9,975

16 February 1998	Sweden	5 – 2 (0-2, 1-1, 1-2)	Belarus	The Big Hat/ Aqua Wing Arena, Nagano, Japan; Attendance: 4,235

==== Quarter-final ====
All times are local (UTC-7).

18 February 1998	Russia	4 – 1 (1-0, 1-0, 2-0)	Belarus	The Big Hat/ Aqua Wing Arena, Nagano, Japan; Attendance: 4,628

Contestants; Aleksandr Alekseyev; Aleksandr Andriyevsky; Vadim Bekbulatov; Sergey Yerkovich; Aleksandr Galchenyuk; Aleksey Kalyuzhny; Viktor Karachun; Oleg Khmyl; Andrey Kovalyov; Aleksey Lozhkin; Igor Matushkin; Andrey Mezin; Vasily Pankov; Oleg Romanov; Oleg Antonenko; Yevgeny Roshchin; Ruslan Salei; Aleksandr Shumidub; Andrey Skabelka; Sergey Stas; Vladimir Tsyplakov; Eduard Zankovets; Aleksandr Zhurik

== Nordic combined ==
Men's individual

Events:

- normal hill ski jumping
- 15 km cross-country skiing (Start delay, based on ski jumping results.)

Athlete	Event	Ski Jumping		Cross-country time	Total rank
Athlete	Event	Points	Rank	Cross-country time	Total rank
Sergey Zakharenko	Individual	158.0	48	51:12.2	43
Konstantin Kalinovsky	Individual	181.0	45	49:38.2	42

== Ski jumping ==
Athlete	Event	Jump 1			Jump 2		Total	
Athlete	Event	Distance	Points	Rank	Distance	Points	Points	Rank
Aleksandr Sinyavsky	Normal hill	70.0	71.5	50	did not advance			
Aleksey Shibko	Normal hill	74.0	80.0	40	did not advance			
Aleksey Shibko	Large hill	94.5	65.1	55	did not advance			
Aleksandr Sinyavsky	Large hill	109.0	94.2	32	did not advance			

== Speed skating ==
Men

Event	Athlete	Race	
Event	Athlete	Time	Rank
5000 m	Vitaly Novichenko	7:19.76	32

Women

Event	Athlete	Race 1		Race 2		Total	
Event	Athlete	Time	Rank	Time	Rank	Time	Rank
500 m	Lyudmila Kostyukevich	41.00	32	41.43	34	82.43	31
500 m	Anzhelika Kotyuga	39.76	17	39.85	18	79.61	16
1000 m	Lyudmila Kostyukevich					1:22.58	34
1000 m	Anzhelika Kotyuga					1:21.35	25
3000 m	Svetlana Chepelnikova					4:36.97	29

== Trivia ==
- In a video game released that was related to the Olympic Hockey tournament, Belarus was represented with the Pahonia flag and with the national anthem of the former Soviet Union.
