= Belarus at the 2002 Winter Olympics =

- IOC code: BLR
- NOC: Belarus Olympic Committee
- Website: www.noc.by (in Russian and English)

in Salt Lake City
- Competitors: 64 (44 men, 20 women) in 9 sports
- Flag bearers: Oleg Ryzhenkov, Biathlon
- Medals Ranked 23rd: Gold 0 Silver 0 Bronze 1 Total 1

Winter Olympics appearances (overview)
- 1994; 1998; 2002; 2006; 2010; 2014; 2018; 2022; 2026

Other related appearances
- Poland (1924–1936); Soviet Union (1952–1988); Unified Team (1992); Individual Neutral Athletes (2026)

Belarus competed at the 2002 Winter Olympics in Salt Lake City, United States.

== Medalists ==
Medal	Name	Sport	Event
Bronze	Alexei Grishin	Freestyle skiing	Men's aerials

== Biathlon ==
Men

Event	Athlete	Misses ^{1}	Time	Rank
10 km sprint	Aleksandr Syman	3	27:45.3	56
10 km sprint	Alexei Aidarov	2	27:06.4	37
10 km sprint	Vadim Sashurin	0	26:09.9	12
10 km sprint	Oleg Ryzhenkov	0	26:05.5	11
12.5 km pursuit ^{2}	Aleksandr Syman	3	38:05.8	49
12.5 km pursuit ^{2}	Alexei Aidarov	6	37:43.0	48
12.5 km pursuit ^{2}	Oleg Ryzhenkov	2	35:08.3	21
12.5 km pursuit ^{2}	Vadim Sashurin	1	34:00.5	10

Event	Athlete	Time	Misses	Adjusted time ^{3}	Rank
20 km	Rustam Valiullin	52:46.7	6	58:46.7	60
20 km	Oleg Ryzhenkov	51:56.6	4	55:56.6	31
20 km	Alexei Aidarov	51:25.3	3	54:25.3	17
20 km	Vadim Sashurin	52:52.6	0	52:52.6	9

Men's 4 × 7.5 km relay

Athletes	Race		
Athletes	Misses ^{1}	Time	Rank
Alexei Aidarov; Aleksandr Syman; Oleg Ryzhenkov; Vadim Sashurin	1	1'27:12.0	8

Women

Event	Athlete	Misses ^{1}	Time	Rank
7.5 km sprint	Kseniya Zikunkova	5	25:21.5	65
7.5 km sprint	Yevgeniya Kutsepalova	1	23:26.5	44
7.5 km sprint	Yelena Khrustalyova	2	23:06.6	33
7.5 km sprint	Olga Nazarova	1	22:14.9	14
10 km pursuit ^{4}	Yevgeniya Kutsepalova	2	34:40.1	28
10 km pursuit ^{4}	Olga Nazarova	1	32:24.5	11

Event	Athlete	Time	Misses	Adjusted time ^{3}	Rank
15 km	Lyudmila Ananko	DNF	–	DNF	–
15 km	Lyudmila Lysenko	50:25.4	4	54:25.4	51
15 km	Kseniya Zikunkova	49:26.8	3	52:26.8	38
15 km	Olga Nazarova	47:29.9	1	48:29.9	6

Women's 4 × 7.5 km relay

Athletes	Race		
Athletes	Misses ^{1}	Time	Rank
Olga Nazarova; Lyudmila Lysenko; Yevgeniya Kutsepalova; Yelena Khrustalyova	0	1'31:01.6	7

^{1} A penalty loop of 150 metres had to be skied per missed target.
^{2} Starting delay based on 10 km sprint results.
^{3} One minute added per missed target.
^{4} Starting delay based on 7.5 km sprint results.

== Cross-country skiing ==
Men

Sprint

Athlete	Qualifying round		Quarter finals		Semi finals		Finals	
Athlete	Time	Rank	Time	Rank	Time	Rank	Time	Final rank
Aleksandr Shalak	3:13.63	58	did not advance					
Denis Vorobyov	3:08.79	56	did not advance					
Aleksey Tregubov	3:08.05	55	did not advance					
Roman Virolaynen	2:57.48	27	did not advance					

Pursuit

Athlete	10 km C		10 km F pursuit^{1}	
Athlete	Time	Rank	Time	Final rank
Denis Vorobyov	30:04.3	65	did not advance	
Aleksandr Sannikov	29:30.5	61	did not advance	
Sergey Dolidovich	28:44.0	54 Q	DNS	–
Roman Virolaynen	26:42.2	9 Q	25:29.1	30

Event	Athlete	Race	
Event	Athlete	Time	Rank
15 km C	Aleksey Tregubov	42:00.7	51
15 km C	Nikolay Semenyako	41:48.0	48
15 km C	Aleksandr Shalak	41:44.5	47
15 km C	Roman Virolaynen	39:02.4	13
30 km F	Aleksandr Sannikov	1'19:46.9	53
30 km F	Nikolay Semenyako	1'19:45.6	52
30 km F	Denis Vorobyov	1'17:43.2	44
30 km F	Sergey Dolidovich	1'13:51.1	14
50 km C	Aleksandr Shalak	2'24:37.2	46
50 km C	Aleksandr Sannikov	2'24:14.2	44
50 km C	Aleksey Tregubov	2'22:29.3	40

^{1} Starting delay based on 10 km C. results.
C = Classical style, F = Freestyle

4 × 10 km relay

Athletes	Race	
Athletes	Time	Rank
Roman Virolaynen; Nikolay Semenyako; Aleksandr Sannikov; Sergey Dolidovich	1'42:12.0	15

Women

Sprint

Athlete	Qualifying round		Quarter finals		Semi finals		Finals	
Athlete	Time	Rank	Time	Rank	Time	Rank	Time	Final rank
Nataliya Sviridova-Kalinovskaya	3:31.83	45	did not advance					
Viktoriya Lopatina	3:20.59	24	did not advance					

Pursuit

Athlete	5 km C		5 km F pursuit^{2}	
Athlete	Time	Rank	Time	Final rank
Nataliya Sviridova-Kalinovskaya	14:53.6	61	did not advance	
Yelena Kalugina	14:34.6	52	did not advance	
Nataliya Zyatikova	14:23.5	45 Q	13:31.2	34
Vera Zyatikova	14:15.2	37 Q	13:29.8	32

Event	Athlete	Race	
Event	Athlete	Time	Rank
10 km C	Yelena Kalugina	31:10.9	43
10 km C	Nataliya Zyatikova	30:44.2	35
10 km C	Vera Zyatikova	30:20.5	27
10 km C	Svetlana Nageykina	29:48.4	14
15 km F	Nataliya Sviridova-Kalinovskaya	44:09.2	40
15 km F	Nataliya Zyatikova	42:04.5	17
15 km F	Vera Zyatikova	42:04.5	17
15 km F	Svetlana Nageykina	40:17.9	5
30 km C	Irina Skripnik	1'42:49.1	30
30 km C	Nataliya Zyatikova	1'42:18.0	29
30 km C	Svetlana Nageykina	1'35:51.6	11

^{2} Starting delay based on 5 km C. results.
C = Classical style, F = Freestyle

4 × 5 km relay

Athletes	Race	
Athletes	Time	Rank
Yelena Kalugina; Svetlana Nageykina; Vera Zyatikova; Nataliya Zyatikova	50:37.9	5

== Figure skating ==
Men

Athlete	Points	SP	FS	Rank
Sergei Davydov	31.5	15	24	21

Women

Athlete	Points	SP	FS	Rank
Julia Soldatova	29.0	22	18	18

== Freestyle skiing ==
Men

Athlete	Event	Qualification		Final	
Athlete	Event	Points	Rank	Points	Rank
Dmitry Dashchinsky	Aerials	219.94	12 Q	244.29	7
Dmitry Rak	Aerials	240.87	5 Q	226.34	10
Alexei Grichin	Aerials	251.76	1 Q	251.19	3rd place, bronze medalist(s)

Women

Athlete	Event	Qualification		Final	
Athlete	Event	Points	Rank	Points	Rank
Assol Slivets	Aerials	157.96	13	did not advance	
Alla Tsuper	Aerials	181.37	3 Q	164.92	9

== Ice hockey ==
=== Men's tournament ===
==== Preliminary round - Group B ====
Top team (shaded) advanced to the first round.

Team	GP	W	L	T	GF	GA	GD	Pts
Belarus	3	2	1	0	5	3	+2	4
Ukraine	3	2	1	0	9	5	+4	4
Switzerland	3	1	1	1	7	9	−2	3
France	3	0	2	1	6	10	−4	1

All times are local (UTC-7).

9 February 2002; 14:00	Belarus	1 – 0 (0–0, 0–0, 1–0)	Ukraine	Peaks Ice Arena, Provo; Attendance: 6,294

11 February 2002; 19:00	Belarus	3 – 1 (1–1, 1–0, 1–0)	France	Peaks Ice Arena, Provo; Attendance: 6,214

12 February 2002; 16:00	Switzerland	2 – 1 (1–0, 1–1, 0–0)	Belarus	E Center, West Valley City; Attendance: 7,736

==== First round - Group D ====
Team	GP	W	L	T	GF	GA	GD	Pts
United States	3	2	0	1	16	3	+13	5
Finland	3	2	1	0	11	8	+3	4
Russia	3	1	1	1	9	9	0	3
Belarus	3	0	3	0	6	22	−16	0

All times are local (UTC-7).

15 February 2002; 11:05	Russia	6 – 4 (3–1, 1–2, 2–1)	Belarus	E Center, West Valley City; Attendance: 8,484

16 February 2002; 16:45	Finland	8 – 1 (3–0, 3–0, 2–1)	Belarus	E Center, West Valley City; Attendance: 8,599

18 February 2002; 11:05	Belarus	1 – 8 (1–0, 0–3, 0–5)	United States	E Center, West Valley City; Attendance: 8,599

==== Medal round ====
Quarter final

20 February 2002; 11:05	Sweden	3 – 4 (1–2, 1–0, 1–2)	Belarus	E Center, West Valley City; Attendance: 7,240

Semi final

22 February 2002; 12:00	Canada	7 – 1 (2–1, 2–0, 3–0)	Belarus	E Center, West Valley City; Attendance: 8,599

Bronze medal game

23 February 2002; 12:15	Belarus 4th	2 – 7 (1–2, 1–2, 0–3)	Russia	E Center, West Valley City; Attendance: 8,599

Contestants; Aleksandr Andriyevsky; Oleg Antonenko; Vadim Bekbulatov; Dmitry Dudik; Aleksey Kalyuzhny; Oleg Khmyl; Konstantin Koltsov; Vladimir Kopat; Andrey Kovalyov; Aleksandr Makritsky; Igor Matushkin; Andrey Mezin; Oleg Mikulchik; Dmitry Pankov; Andrey Rasolko; Oleg Romanov; Ruslan Salei; Sergey Shabanov; Andrey Skabelka; Sergey Stas; Vladimir Tsyplakov; Eduard Zankovets; Aleksandr Zhurik; Vasily Pankov

== Nordic combined ==
Men's sprint

Events:

- large hill ski jumping
- 7.5 km cross-country skiing (Start delay, based on ski jumping results.)

Athlete	Ski Jumping		Cross-country time	Total rank
Athlete	Points	Rank	Cross-country time	Total rank
Sergey Zakharenko	86.6	40	19:29.5	38

Men's individual

Events:

- normal hill ski jumping
- 15 km cross-country skiing (Start delay, based on ski jumping results.)

Athlete	Ski Jumping		Cross-country time	Total rank
Athlete	Points	Rank	Cross-country time	Total rank
Sergey Zakharenko	171.5	45	49:18.9	44

== Short track speed skating ==
Women

Athlete	Event	Round one		Quarter finals		Semi finals		Finals	
Athlete	Event	Time	Rank	Time	Rank	Time	Rank	Time	Final rank
Yuliya Pavlovich-Yelsakova	500 m	47.273	3	did not advance					
Yuliya Pavlovich-Yelsakova	1500 m	2:36.058	4	did not advance					

== Ski jumping ==
Athlete	Event	Qualifying jump			Final jump 1			Final jump 2		Total	
Athlete	Event	Distance	Points	Rank	Distance	Points	Rank	Distance	Points	Points	Rank
Andrey Lyskovets	Normal hill	81.5	95.0	33 Q	83.5	98.0	42	did not advance			
Andrey Lyskovets	Large hill	96.0	66.3	45	did not advance						

== Speed skating ==
Men

Event	Athlete	Race 1		Race 2		Total	
Event	Athlete	Time	Rank	Time	Rank	Time	Rank
500 m	Aleksey Khatylyov	37.40	33	37.41	36	74.81	32
1000 m	Aleksey Khatylyov					1:13.73	42
1000 m	Igor Makovetsky					1:12.33	41
1500 m	Aleksey Khatylyov					1:52.87	47
1500 m	Igor Makovetsky					1:50.15	40

Women

Event	Athlete	Race 1		Race 2		Total	
Event	Athlete	Time	Rank	Time	Rank	Time	Rank
500 m	Svetlana Radkevich	39.84	30	39.61	27	79.45	28
500 m	Anzhelika Kotyuga	37.73	6	37.66	4	75.39	5
1000 m	Svetlana Radkevich					1:18.93	33
1000 m	Anzhelika Kotyuga					1:15.03	12
1500 m	Svetlana Chepelnikova					2:04.06	34
3000 m	Svetlana Chepelnikova					4:24.96	32
