= Belarus at the 1994 Winter Olympics =

- IOC code: BLR
- NOC: Belarus Olympic Committee
- Website: www.noc.by (in Russian and English)

in Lillehammer
- Competitors: 33 (21 men, 12 women) in 7 sports
- Flag bearer: Igor Zhelezovski (speed skating)
- Medals Ranked 15th: Gold 0 Silver 2 Bronze 0 Total 2

Winter Olympics appearances (overview)
- 1994; 1998; 2002; 2006; 2010; 2014; 2018; 2022; 2026

Other related appearances
- Poland (1924–1936); Soviet Union (1952–1988); Unified Team (1992); Individual Neutral Athletes (2026)

Belarus competed in the Winter Olympic Games as an independent nation for the first time at the 1994 Winter Olympics in Lillehammer, Norway. Previously, Belarusian athletes competed for the Unified Team at the 1992 Winter Olympics.

== Medalists ==
Medal	Name	Sport	Event	Date
Silver	Igor Zhelezovski	Speed skating	Men's 1000 metres	18 February
Silver	Svetlana Paramygina	Biathlon	Women's sprint	23 February

== Competitors ==
The following is the list of number of competitors in the Games.

Sport	Men	Women	Total
Biathlon	6	5	11
Cross-country skiing	5	4	9
Figure skating	3	2	5
Freestyle skiing	3	1	4
Nordic combined	1	–	1
Ski jumping	1	–	1
Speed skating	2	0	2
Total	21	12	33

== Biathlon ==
Men

Athlete	Event	Final		
Athlete	Event	Time	Pen.	Rank
Igor Khokhryakov	10 km Sprint	31:50.7	4	45
Viktor Maigourov	10 km Sprint	31:09.2	3	37
Viktor Maigourov	20 km Individual	1:00:42.7	4	23
Eugeni Redkine	20 km Individual	1:03:34.9	6	53
Alexandr Popov	10 km Sprint	29:38.5	0	10
Alexandr Popov	20 km Individual	57:53.1	0	4
Oleg Ryzhenkov	10 km Sprint	30:11.0	3	17
Vadim Sashurin	20 km Individual	1:01:09.8	2	28
Viktor Maigourov; Igor Khokhryakov; Oleg Ryzhenkov; Alexandr Popov	4 × 7.5 kilometres relay	1:32:57.2	0	4

Women

Athlete	Event	Final		
Athlete	Event	Time	Pen.	Rank
Irina Kokuyeva	7.5 km Sprint	26:38.4	2	6
Irina Kokuyeva	15 km Individual	56:12.0	6	28
Lyudmila Lysenko	7.5 km Sprint	29:23.9	3	50
Svetlana Paramygina	7.5 km Sprint	26:09.9	2	Silver
Svetlana Paramygina	15 km Individual	53:21.3	4	4
Nataliya Permyakova	7.5 km Sprint	28:26.9	4	38
Nataliya Permyakova	15 km Individual	53:39.2	2	7
Nataliya Ryzhenkova	15 km Individual	59:26.9	9	49
Irina Kokuyeva; Nataliya Permyakova; Nataliya Ryzhenkova; Svetlana Paramygina	4× 7.5 km Relay	1:54:55.1	8	6

== Cross-country skiing ==
Men

Athlete	Event	Final					
Athlete	Event	Start	Rank	Time	Rank	Total	Rank
Sergei Dolidovich	10 km Classical					28:02.8	70
Sergei Dolidovich	15 km Free Pursuit	+03:42	70	39:28.5	45	+7:21.7	51
Sergei Dolidovich	30 km Free					1:20:36.5	37
Vasily Gorbachyov	30 km Free					1:24:17.9	57
Vasily Gorbachyov	50 km Classical					2:21:31.3	43
Viktor Kamotsky	10 km Classical					26:22.6	28
Viktor Kamotsky	15 km Free Pursuit						DNS
Viktor Kamotsky	30 km Free					1:19:47.7	31
Viktor Kamotsky	50 km Classical					2:15:02.9	21
Igor Obukhov	10 km Classical					27:29.2	62
Igor Obukhov	15 km Free Pursuit	+03:09	62	39:24.5	42	+6:44.7	46
Igor Obukhov	50 km Classical					2:17:08.4	25
Vyacheslav Plaksunov	10 km Classical					27:12.1	53
Vyacheslav Plaksunov	15 km Free Pursuit	+02:52	53	37:23.2	12	+4:26.4	21
Vyacheslav Plaksunov	30 km Free					1:18:57.7	27
Igor Obukhov; Viktor Kamotsky; Sergei Dolidovich; Vyacheslav Plaksunov	4 × 10 km relay					1:49:23.7	12

Women

Athlete	Event	Final					
Athlete	Event	Start	Rank	Time	Rank	Total	Rank
Lyudmila Dideleva	5 km Classical					15:57.7	37
Lyudmila Dideleva	10 km Free Pursuit	+01:49	37	31:58.9	48	+6:17.8	45
Yelena Piiraynen	5 km Classical					16:25.0	44
Yelena Piiraynen	10 km Free Pursuit	+02:17	44	31:49.4	45	+6:36.3	49
Yelena Piiraynen	15 km Free					48:45.3	51
Svetlana Kamotskaya	5 km Classical					16:25.8	45
Svetlana Kamotskaya	10 km Free Pursuit						DNS
Svetlana Kamotskaya	15 km Free					47:56.5	50
Svetlana Kamotskaya	30 km Classical					1:36:51.0	44
Yelena Sinkevich	5 km Classical					15:50.2	34
Yelena Sinkevich	10 km Free Pursuit						DNF
Yelena Sinkevich	15 km Free					45:45.4	33
Yelena Sinkevich	30 km Classical					1:31:47.8	22
Yelena Piiraynen; Svetlana Kamotskaya; Lyudmila Dideleva; Yelena Sinkevich	4 × 5 km relay					1:04:25.8	14

== Figure skating ==
Men

Athlete	Final				
Athlete	Short Program	Rank	Free Skating	Total	Rank
Alexander Murashko	12.0	24	23.0	35.0	23

Pairs

Athlete	Final				
Athlete	Short Program	Rank	Free Skating	Total	Rank
Yelena Grigoryeva; Sergey Sheyko	9.0	18	17.0	26.0	17

Ice Dancing

Athlete	Final								
Athlete	Compulsory Dance 1	Rank	Compulsory Dance 2	Rank	Original Dance	Rank	Free Dance	Total	Rank
Tatiana Navka; Samvel Gezalian	2.2	11	2.2	11	6.6	11	11.0	22.0	11

== Freestyle skiing ==
Men

Athlete	Event	Qualifying		Final	
Athlete	Event	Points	Rank	Points	Rank
Aleksey Parfenkov	Aerials	228.49	1 Q	178.48	12
Aleksandr Penigin	Moguls	19.41	28	Did Not Advance	
Vasily Vorobyov	Aerials	188.92	13	Did Not Advance	

Women

Athlete	Event	Qualifying		Final	
Athlete	Event	Points	Rank	Points	Rank
Yuliya Rakovich	Aerials	152.10	5 Q	135.53	10

== Nordic combined ==
Men's individual

Events:

- normal hill ski jumping
- 15 km cross-country skiing (Start delay, based on ski jumping results.)

Athlete	Event	Ski Jumping		Cross-country time	Total rank
Athlete	Event	Points	Rank	Cross-country time	Total rank
Sergey Zakharenko	Individual	146.5	50	53:44.3	50

== Ski jumping ==
Athlete	Event	First Round		Final		
Athlete	Event	Points	Rank	Points	Total	Rank
Aleksandr Sinyavsky	Large hill	22.7	57	46.9	69.6	54
Aleksandr Sinyavsky	Normal hill	93.5	44	85.5	179.0	38

== Speed skating ==
Men

Athlete	Event	Final	
Athlete	Event	Time	Rank
Vitali Novichenko	1500 metres	1:57.50	35
Vitali Novichenko	5000 metres	7:17.55	32
Igor Zhelezovski	500 metres	36.73	10
Igor Zhelezovski	1000 metres	1:12.72	Silver

== Trivia ==
As of 2022, this is the only Olympic Games that Belarus competed under the tricolour white-red-white flag. At the 1996 Summer Olympics, the current national flag of green, red, and a red on white ornamental pattern was used.

== Sources ==
- Official Olympic Reports
- International Olympic Committee results database
- Olympic Winter Games 1994, full results by sports-reference.com
