= Belarus at the 2010 Winter Olympics =

- IOC code: BLR
- NOC: Belarus Olympic Committee
- Website: www.noc.by (in Russian and English)

in Vancouver
- Competitors: 50 in 6 sports
- Flag bearer: Oleg Antonenko
- Medals Ranked 17th: Gold 1 Silver 1 Bronze 1 Total 3

Winter Olympics appearances (overview)
- 1994; 1998; 2002; 2006; 2010; 2014; 2018; 2022; 2026

Other related appearances
- Poland (1924–1936); Soviet Union (1952–1988); Unified Team (1992)

Belarus participated at the 2010 Winter Olympics in Vancouver, British Columbia, Canada.

== Medalists ==
Medal	Name	Sport	Event	Date
Gold	Alexei Grishin	Freestyle skiing	Men's aerials	25 February
Silver	Sergey Novikov	Biathlon	Men's individual	18 February
Bronze	Darya Domracheva	Biathlon	Women's individual	18 February

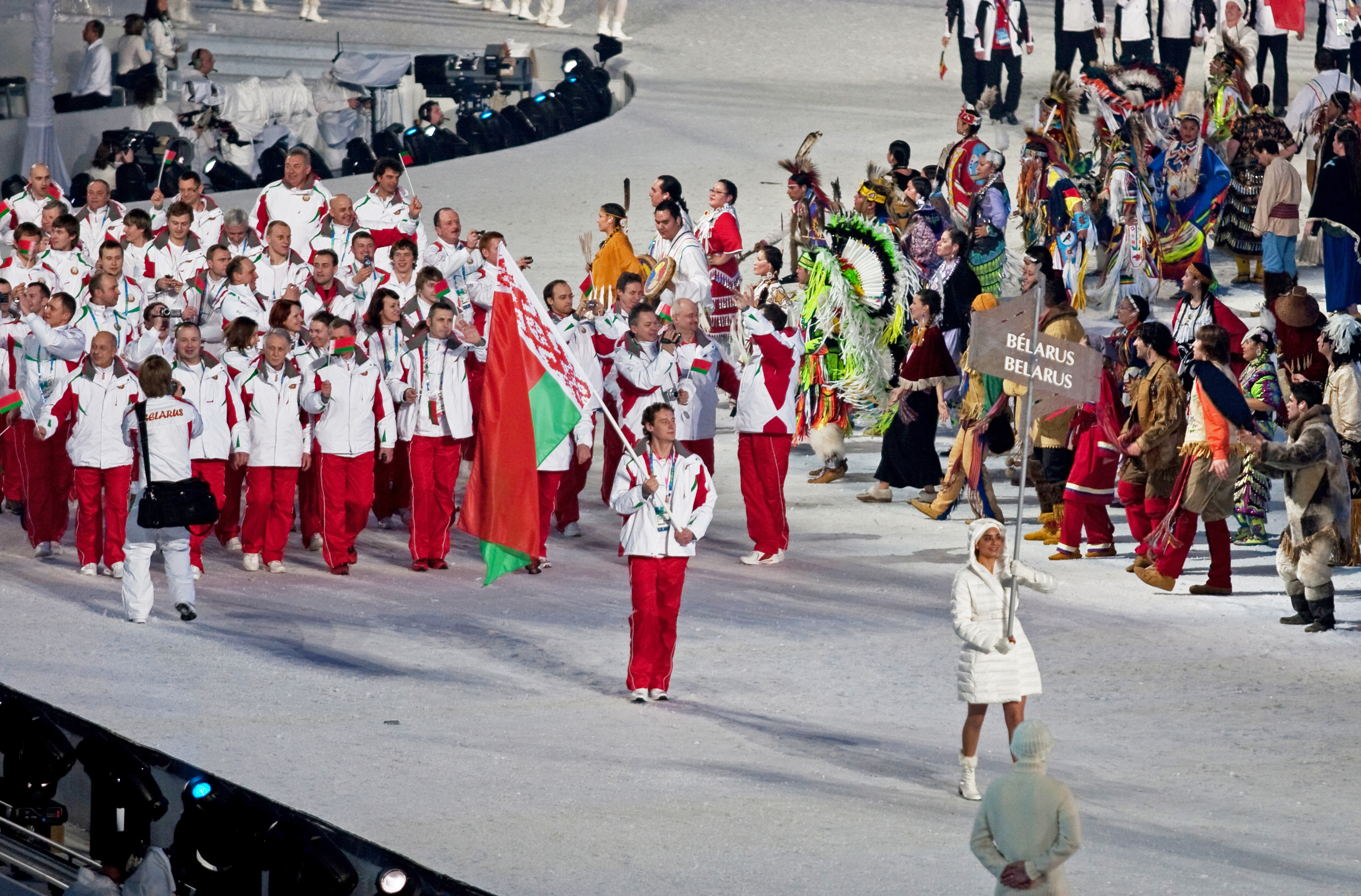
The athletes entering the stadium during the opening ceremonies.

== Alpine skiing ==
Women

Athlete	Event	Run 1	Run 2	Total	Rank
Lizaveta Kuzmenka	Women's giant slalom	1:24.60	1:26.29	2:50.89	54
Lizaveta Kuzmenka	Women's slalom	59.97	DNF		
Maria Shkanova	Women's giant slalom	1:22.18	1:18.20	2:40.38	40
Maria Shkanova	Women's slalom	56.92	57.58	1:54.50	39
Maria Shkanova	Women's super-G			1:27.84	33

== Biathlon ==
- Evgeny Abramenko
- Vladimir Miklashevski
- Sergei Novikov
- Michail Semenov
- Alexander Syman
- Rustam Valliulin
- Lyudmila Ananko
- Darya Domracheva
- Lyudmila Kalinchik
- Olga Kudryashova
- Olga Nazarova
- Nadezhda Skardino

== Cross-country skiing ==
Men

Athlete	Event	Qualification		Quarterfinals		Semifinals		Final	
Athlete	Event	Time	Rank	Time	Rank	Time	Rank	Time	Rank
Sergei Dolidovich	15 km freestyle							35:29.4	35
Sergei Dolidovich	30 km pursuit							DNF	
Sergei Dolidovich	50 km classic							2:07:47.6	25
Aliaksei Ivanou	15 km freestyle							36:48.2	60
Aliaksei Ivanou	30 km pursuit							1:23:37.7	48
Aliaksei Ivanou	50 km classic							2:17:59.2	45
Leanid Karneyenka	15 km freestyle							37:29.2	63
Leanid Karneyenka	Sprint	3:49.12	51	did not qualify					51
Sergei Dolidovich, Leanid Karneyenka	Team sprint					DNF			

Women

Athlete	Event	Qualification		Quarterfinals		Semifinals		Final	
Athlete	Event	Time	Rank	Time	Rank	Time	Rank	Time	Rank
Nastassia Dubarezava	15 km pursuit							45:27.9	54
Nastassia Dubarezava	30 km classic							1:42:28.1	44
Nastassia Dubarezava	Sprint	3:56.87	42	did not qualify					42
Ekaterina Rudakova	10 km freestyle							28:16.1	59
Ekaterina Rudakova	15 km pursuit							44:50.5	50
Alena Sannikova	10 km freestyle							27:21.3	44
Alena Sannikova	15 km pursuit							43:33.7	39
Alena Sannikova	30 km classic							1:38:31.3	38
Olga Vasiljonok	10 km freestyle							28:06.2	56
Olga Vasiljonok	Sprint	4:01.73	46	did not qualify					46
Ekaterina Rudakova, Olga Vasiljonok	Team sprint					19:52.3	7	did not advance	
Nastassia Dubarezava, Ekaterina Rudakova, Alena Sannikova, Olga Vasiljonok	4 x 5 km relay							58:28.4	10

== Freestyle skiing ==
Men

Athlete	Event	Qualifying		Final	
Athlete	Event	Points	Rank	Points	Rank
Dmitri Dashinski	Men's aerials	238.33	4 Q	215.68	11
Alexei Grishin	Men's aerials	234.27	7 Q	248.41	1st place, gold medalist(s)
Anton Kushnir	Men's aerials	213.90	15	did not advance	
Timofei Slivets	Men's aerials	221.91	12 Q	225.58	9

Women

Athlete	Event	Qualifying		Final	
Athlete	Event	Points	Rank	Points	Rank
Assol Slivets	Women's aerials	169.39	7 Q	198.69	4
Alla Tsuper	Women's aerials	195.76	1 Q	181.84	8

== Ice hockey ==
=== Men's tournament ===
Roster

The following is the Belarusian roster in the men's ice hockey tournament of the 2010 Winter Olympics.

No.	Pos.	Name	Height	Weight	Birthdate	Birthplace	2009–10 team
1	G	Vitali Koval	188 cm (6 ft 2 in)	100 kg (220 lb)	31 March 1980	Perm, Russian SFSR	(Belarus) Dynamo Minsk (KHL)
37	G	Maxim Malyutin	180 cm (5 ft 11 in)	74 kg (163 lb)	16 September 1988	Yaroslavl, Russian SFSR	(Belarus) Vitebsk (BLR)
31	G	Andrei Mezin	182 cm (6 ft 0 in)	78 kg (172 lb)	8 July 1974	Chelyabinsk, Russian SFSR	(Belarus) Dynamo Minsk (KHL)
7	D	Vladimir Denisov	181 cm (5 ft 11 in)	94 kg (207 lb)	29 June 1984	Navapolatsk	(Belarus) Dynamo Minsk (KHL)
33	D	Andrei Karev	180 cm (5 ft 11 in)	90 kg (200 lb)	12 February 1985	Elektrostal, Russian SFSR	(Belarus) Dynamo Minsk (KHL)
25	D	Sergei Kolosov	193 cm (6 ft 4 in)	92 kg (203 lb)	22 May 1986	Navapolatsk	(United States) Grand Rapids Griffins (AHL)
43	D	Viktor Kostiuchenok	187 cm (6 ft 2 in)	94 kg (207 lb)	7 June 1979	Minsk	(Russia) Spartak Moscow (KHL)
4	D	Alexander Makritski	186 cm (6 ft 1 in)	90 kg (200 lb)	11 August 1971	Minsk	(Belarus) Dynamo Minsk (KHL)
52	D	Alexander Ryadinsky	189 cm (6 ft 2 in)	93 kg (205 lb)	1 April 1978	Minsk	(Belarus) Dynamo Minsk (KHL)
24	D	Ruslan Salei – C	184 cm (6 ft 0 in)	96 kg (212 lb)	2 November 1974	Minsk	(United States) Colorado Avalanche (NHL)
5	D	Nikolai Stasenko	195 cm (6 ft 5 in)	101 kg (223 lb)	15 February 1987	Roshchino, Russian SFSR	(Russia) Amur Khabarovsk (KHL)
10	F	Oleg Antonenko – A	187 cm (6 ft 2 in)	92 kg (203 lb)	1 July 1971	Minsk	(Belarus) Dynamo Minsk (KHL)
59	F	Sergei Demagin	183 cm (6 ft 0 in)	79 kg (174 lb)	19 July 1986	Minsk	(Russia) Neftekhimik Nizhnekamsk (KHL)
71	F	Alexei Kalyuzhny	178 cm (5 ft 10 in)	84 kg (185 lb)	13 June 1977	Minsk	(Russia) Dynamo Moscow (KHL)
28	F	Konstantin Koltsov – A	186 cm (6 ft 1 in)	90 kg (200 lb)	17 April 1981	Minsk	(Russia) Salavat Yulaev Ufa (KHL)
74	F	Sergei Kostitsyn	180 cm (5 ft 11 in)	93 kg (205 lb)	20 March 1987	Navapolatsk	(Canada) Montreal Canadiens (NHL)
11	F	Alexander Kulakov	182 cm (6 ft 0 in)	89 kg (196 lb)	15 May 1983	Minsk	(Belarus) Dynamo Minsk (KHL)
19	F	Dmitri Meleshko	181 cm (5 ft 11 in)	81 kg (179 lb)	8 November 1982	Minsk	(Belarus) Dynamo Minsk (KHL)
8	F	Andrei Mikhalev	185 cm (6 ft 1 in)	90 kg (200 lb)	23 February 1978	Minsk	(Belarus) Dynamo Minsk (KHL)
26	F	Andrei Stas	187 cm (6 ft 2 in)	83 kg (183 lb)	18 October 1988	Minsk	(Belarus) Dynamo Minsk (KHL)
18	F	Alexei Ugarov	179 cm (5 ft 10 in)	80 kg (180 lb)	2 January 1985	Minsk	(Russia) HC MVD (KHL)
22	F	Sergei Zadelenov	178 cm (5 ft 10 in)	88 kg (194 lb)	27 February 1976	Navapolatsk	(Belarus) Dynamo Minsk (KHL)
21	F	Konstantin Zakharov	186 cm (6 ft 1 in)	93 kg (205 lb)	2 May 1985	Minsk	(Belarus) Dynamo Minsk (KHL)

Defencemen Andrei Antonov, Andrei Bashko, Vadim Sushko and Aleksandr Syrei, along with forwards Mikhail Grabovski and Andrei Kostitsyn, were initially selected but could not play due to injuries. The players chosen to replace them were defencemen Andrei Karev, Sergei Kolosov, Alexander Makritski and Alexander Ryadinsky, and forwards Dmitri Meleshko and Konstantin Zakharov.

==== Group play ====
Belarus played in Group C.

Round-robin

All times are local (UTC-8).

17 February 2010; 12:00	Finland	5–1 (2–0, 1–1, 2–0)	Belarus	Canada Hockey Place, Vancouver; Attendance: 16,639

Game reference

Miikka Kiprusoff
Goalies
Vitali Koval
Referees:
(Canada) Paul Devorski
(Slovakia) Peter Ország
Linesmen:
(United States) Brian Murphy
(Slovakia) Milan Novak

O. Jokinen (S. Koivu, T. Selänne) (PP) – 3:24	1–0
N. Hagman (M. Koivu, J. Pitkänen) (PP) – 17:50	2–0
	2–1	20:21 – S. Kostitsyn (S. Demagin)
N. Hagman (M. Koivu) – 36:52	3–1
V. Filppula (M. Koivu) – 40:23	4–1
J. Ruutu (L. Kukkonen, N. Kapanen) – 52:59	5–1

4 min
Penalties
12 min
45
Shots
12

19 February 2010; 12:00	Belarus	2–4 (0–2, 1–1, 1–1)	Sweden	Canada Hockey Place, Vancouver; Attendance: 16,878

Game reference

Andrei Mezin
Goalies
Jonas Gustavsson
Referees:
(United States) Dennis LaRue
(Switzerland) Brent Reiber
Linesmen:
(United States) Brian Murphy
(Russia) Yuri Oskirko

	0–1	6:40 – D. Sedin (H. Sedin, M. Weinhandl)
	0–2	9:04 – D. Alfredsson (M. Johansson, N. Bäckström) (PP)
	0–3	29:35 – J. Franzén (S. Påhlsson, F. Modin)
D. Meleshko (N. Stasenko, A. Ryadinsky) (PP) – 34:40	1–3
D. Meleshko (A. Kulakov) – 51:33	2–3
	2–4	59:49 – D. Alfredsson (H. Sedin, D. Sedin)

8 min
Penalties
4 min
19
Shots
38

20 February 2010; 21:00	Germany	3–5 (1–1, 0–1, 2–3)	Belarus	Canada Hockey Place, Vancouver; Attendance: 16,979

Game reference

Thomas Greiss
Goalies
Vitali Koval
Referees:
(Switzerland) Danny Kurmann
(Canada) Bill McCreary
Linesmen:
(Czech Republic) Petr Blümel
(United States) Shane Heyer

D. Seidenberg (M. Sturm, M. Goc) (PP) – 5:39	1–0
	1–1	10:43 – A. Ugarov
	1–2	28:36 – A. Kalyuzhny (S. Kostitsyn, N. Stasenko)
	1–3	51:10 – S. Kostitsyn (K. Koltsov)
J. Tripp (A. Rankel) – 51:49	2–3
M. Goc (J. Hecht) – 52:10	3–3
	3–4	54:36 – R. Salei (A. Kalyuzhny, S. Kostitsyn) (PP)
	3–5	58:45 – A. Kalyuzhny (K. Koltsov, S. Kostitsyn)

8 min
Penalties
6 min
40
Shots
17

Standings

Team	Pld	W	OTW	OTL	L	GF	GA	GD	Pts	Qualification
Sweden	3	3	0	0	0	9	2	+7	9	Quarterfinals
Finland	3	2	0	0	1	10	4	+6	6	Quarterfinals
Belarus	3	1	0	0	2	8	12	−4	3	
Germany	3	0	0	0	3	3	12	−9	0	

Source: IIHF

==== Final rounds ====
Qualification playoff

23 February 2010; 12:00	Switzerland	3–2 (SO) (1–1, 1–1, 0–0, 0–0, 1–0)	Belarus	Canada Hockey Place, Vancouver; Attendance: 17,397

Game reference

Jonas Hiller
Goalies
Andrei Mezin
Referees:
(Canada) Paul Devorski
(Slovakia) Peter Ország
Linesmen:
(Czech Republic) Petr Blümel
(United States) Tim Nowak

	0–1	0:59 – A. Kalyuzhny (V. Kostyuchenok)
J. Sprunger (R. Wick, M. Plüss) (PP) – 12:25	1–1
H. Domenichelli (M. Streit, S. Blindenbacher) (PP) – 27:07	2–1
	2–2	35:42 – K. Zakharov (A. Ugarov, N. Stasenko) (PP)

T. Déruns
R. Lemm
I. Rüthemann (miss)
Shootout
(miss) O. Antonenko
D. Meleshko
(miss) S. Kostitsyn
10 min
Penalties
6 min
42
Shots
22

== Speed skating ==
Women

Athlete	Event	Race 1		Race 2		Final	
Athlete	Event	Time	Rank	Time	Rank	Time	Rank
Svetlana Radkevich	500 m	39.899	35	39.854	33	79.753	33

== See also ==
- Belarus at the Olympics
- Belarus at the 2010 Winter Paralympics
