= Cross-country skiing at the 2002 Winter Olympics – Men's 15 kilometre classical =

Men's 15 kilometre classical at the XIX Olympic Winter Games
- Venue: Soldier Hollow
- Dates: 12 February 2002
- Competitors: 67 from 26 nations
- Winning time: 37:07.4

Medalists
1st place, gold medalist(s)		Andrus Veerpalu; Estonia
2nd place, silver medalist(s)		Frode Estil; Norway
3rd place, bronze medalist(s)		Jaak Mae; Estonia

The men's 15 kilometre classical cross-country skiing competition at the 2002 Winter Olympics in Salt Lake City, United States, was held on 12 February at Soldier Hollow.

Each skier started at half a minute intervals, skiing the entire 15 kilometre course. Per Elofsson was the 2001 World champion. The defending Olympic champion was the Norwegian Thomas Alsgaard, who won in Nagano, but the 15 kilometre event was held as a pursuit.

== Results ==
Rank	Name	Country	Time
Gold medal	Andrus Veerpalu	Estonia	37:07.4
Silver medal	Frode Estil	Norway	37:43.4
Bronze medal	Jaak Mae	Estonia	37:50.8
4	Anders Aukland	Norway	38:08.3
5	Per Elofsson	Sweden	38:10.8
6	Erling Jevne	Norway	38:13.6
7	Vitaly Denisov	Russia	38:17.9
8	Magnus Ingesson	Sweden	38:38.5
9	Reto Burgermeister	Switzerland	38:49.2
10	Sergey Novikov	Russia	38:49.3
11	Mikhail Ivanov	Russia	38:51.3
12	John Bauer	United States	38:55.7
13	Roman Virolaynen	Belarus	39:02.4
14	Axel Teichmann	Germany	39:05.3
15	Andreas Schlütter	Germany	39:19.2
16	Patrick Weaver	United States	39:24.4
17	Urban Lindgren	Sweden	39:24.8
18	Andrey Golovko	Kazakhstan	39:28.1
19	Masaaki Kozu	Japan	39:28.3
20	Odd-Bjørn Hjelmeset	Norway	39:31.4
21	Ivan Bátory	Slovakia	39:32.0
22	Kris Freeman	United States	39:34.3
23	Alexander Marent	Austria	39:36.2
24	Martin Bajčičák	Slovakia	39:39.4
25	Vasily Rochev	Russia	39:42.1
26	Freddy Schwienbacher	Italy	39:44.9
27	Morgan Göransson	Sweden	39:45.7
28	Cristian Saracco	Italy	39:48.4
29	Jiří Magál	Czech Republic	39:48.6
30	Kuisma Taipale	Finland	39:50.3
31	Fulvio Valbusa	Italy	39:50.6
32	Roman Leybyuk	Ukraine	39:50.9
33	Jens Filbrich	Germany	39:57.0
34	Petr Michl	Czech Republic	40:00.2
35	Giorgio Di Centa	Italy	40:22.6
36	Hiroyuki Imai	Japan	40:27.1
37	Denis Krivushkin	Kazakhstan	40:27.7
38	Hiroshi Kudo	Japan	40:29.9
39	Ričardas Panavas	Lithuania	40:31.0
40	Meelis Aasmäe	Estonia	40:31.2
41	Gerhard Urain	Austria	40:38.0
42	Pavel Ryabinin	Kazakhstan	41:03.2
43	Karri Hietamäki	Finland	41:13.6
44	Igor Zubrilin	Kazakhstan	41:15.5
45	Milan Šperl	Czech Republic	41:16.7
46	Donald Farley	Canada	41:26.6
47	Aleksandr Shalak	Belarus	41:44.5
48	Nikolay Semenyako	Belarus	41:48.0
49	Juris Ģērmanis	Latvia	41:50.1
50	Katsuhito Ebisawa	Japan	41:51.4
51	Aleksey Tregubov	Belarus	42:00.7
52	Vladislavas Zybaila	Lithuania	42:07.9
53	Ari Palolahti	Finland	42:10.7
54	Lars Flora	United States	42:11.5
55	Peter Schlickenrieder	Germany	42:34.0
56	Han Dawei	China	42:34.5
57	Priit Narusk	Estonia	43:03.2
58	Denis Klobučar	Croatia	43:45.0
59	Vadim Gusevas	Lithuania	43:56.2
60	Ivan Bayrakov	Bulgaria	45:41.2
61	Damir Jurčević	Croatia	45:49.6
62	Park Byeong-Ju	South Korea	45:51.4
63	Jargalyn Erdenetülkhüür	Mongolia	45:54.7
64	Choi Im-heon	South Korea	46:13.3
65	Lefteris Fafalis	Greece	46:17.9
66	Aram Hadzhiyan	Armenia	46:42.9
	Slavcho Batinkov	Bulgaria	DNF
