= Novichenko =

Novichenko (Ukrainian: Новіченко; Russian: Новиченко) is a patronymic surname of Ukrainian origin derived from the term novik (новик), historically referring to any type of a newcomer. Notable people with the surname include:

- Vitaly Novichenko (born 1975), Belarusian speed skater
- Yakov Novichenko (1914–1994), Soviet military officer
