= Belarusian Ice Hockey Hall of Fame =

The Belarusian Ice Hockey Hall of Fame is the national ice hockey hall of fame in Belarus. It was established on February 10, 2012 in Minsk, with the induction of Ruslan Salei, who perished in the 2011 Lokomotiv Yaroslavl plane crash.

== Members ==
- Ruslan Salei (inducted on February 10, 2012)
