= Saracco =

Saracco is an Italian surname and may refer to:

== People ==
- Gaetano Saracco (1856–1922), Italian choreographer and dancer
- Giuseppe Saracco (1821–1907), former Prime Minister of Italy (1900–1901)
- Umberto Saracco (born 1994), Italian football player
- Cristian Saracco (born 1976); see Cross-country skiing at the 2006 Winter Olympics – Men's 15 kilometre classical

== Other uses ==
- Saracco Cabinet (24 June 1900 – 15 February 1901), a Kingdom of Italy cabinet led by Prime Minister Giuseppe Saracco
