= Reztsov =

Reztsov (Russian: Резцов) is a Russian masculine surname; its feminine counterpart is Reztsova. It may refer to the following notable people:

- Anfisa Reztsova (née Romanova, 1964–2023), Russian biathlete and cross-country skier
- Daria Virolaynen (née Reztsova, born 1989), Russian and Finnish biathlete, daughter of Anfisa
- Kristina Reztsova (born 1996), Russian biathlete, daughter of Anfisa
