= Eduard Zankovets =

Belarusian ice hockey player and coach

- Born: September 27, 1969 (age 56) Minsk, Soviet Union
- Height: 5 ft 10 in (178 cm)
- Weight: 172 lb (78 kg; 12 st 4 lb)
- Position: Right wing
- Shot: Left
- National team: Belarus
- NHL draft: Undrafted
- Playing career: 1987–2002

Eduard Konstantinovich Zankovets (born September 27, 1969) is a Belarusian former ice hockey player. He is currently the head coach of the Belarus men's national ice hockey team.

Zankovets competed as a player with the Belarusian team at both 1998 and 2002 Winter Olympics.

== Awards and honors ==
Award	Year
Belarus Player of the Year	1992–93

== Career statistics ==
=== Regular season and playoffs ===
			Regular season					Playoffs
Season	Team	League	GP	G	A	Pts	PIM	GP	G	A	Pts	PIM
1986–87	Dinamo Minsk	URS.2	2	0	1	1	0	—	—	—	—	—
1987–88	Dinamo Minsk	URS.2	52	10	7	17	12	—	—	—	—	—
1988–89	Dinamo Minsk	URS	24	4	4	8	6	—	—	—	—	—
1989–90	Dinamo Minsk	URS	42	7	3	10	23	—	—	—	—	—
1990–91	Dinamo Minsk	URS	26	1	2	3	10	—	—	—	—	—
1991–92	Dinamo Minsk	CIS	25	9	7	16	10	—	—	—	—	—
1992–93	Dinamo Minsk	IHL	42	16	8	24	61	—	—	—	—	—
1992–93	Tivali Minsk	BLR	11	11	9	20	21	—	—	—	—	—
1993–94	Tivali Minsk	IHL	36	4	11	15	22	—	—	—	—	—
1993–94	Tivali Minsk	BLR	13	5	6	11	4	—	—	—	—	—
1994–95	Avangard Omsk	IHL	49	5	9	14	41	3	0	0	0	0
1995–96	Avangard Omsk	IHL	35	3	4	7	12	3	0	0	0	0
1995–96	Avangard–2 Omsk	RUS.2	4	2	0	2	0	—	—	—	—	—
1996–97	AaB Ishockey	DEN	47	49	42	91	12	—	—	—	—	—
1997–98	ES Weißwasser	GER.2	42	24	27	51	57	—	—	—	—	—
1998–99	ES Weißwasser	GER.2	51	29	23	52	45	—	—	—	—	—
1999–2000	HIFK	SM-l	5	3	0	3	0	—	—	—	—	—
1999–2000	SaiPa	SM-l	24	5	2	7	24	—	—	—	—	—
2000–01	Sibir Novosibirsk	RUS.2	11	1	4	5	6	—	—	—	—	—
2000–01	Rockford IceHogs	UHL	27	7	5	12	4	—	—	—	—	—
2001–02	Torpedo Nizhny Novgorod	RSL	16	0	0	0	16	—	—	—	—	—
2001–02	Keramin Minsk	BLR	2	0	0	0	0	—	—	—	—	—
2001–02	Keramin Minsk	EEHL	7	2	0	2	6	—	—	—	—	—
URS/CIS totals			117	21	16	37	49	—	—	—	—	—
IHL totals			162	28	32	60	152	6	0	0	0	0

=== International ===
Year	Team	Event	GP	G	A	Pts	PIM
1992	Belarus	WC C Q	2	1	1	2
1994	Belarus	WC C	6	6	2	8	4
1995	Belarus	WC C	4	1	1	2	2
1996	Belarus	WC B	7	3	0	3	16
1998	Belarus	OG	4	0	0	0	2
2002	Belarus	OG	4	0	0	0	0
2002	Belarus	WC D1	5	4	3	7	2
Senior totals			32	15	7	22	26
