= Yekaterina Antonyuk =

Belarusian cross-country skier (born 1974)

Personal information
- Nationality: Belarusian
- Born: 1 May 1974 (age 50); Magadan, Soviet Union

Sport
- Sport: Cross-country skiing

Yekaterina Antonyuk (born 1 May 1974) is a Belarusian cross-country skier. She competed in two events at the 1998 Winter Olympics.
