= Nataliya Sviridova-Kalinovskaya =

Belarusian cross-country skier (born 1977)

Personal information
- Nationality: Belarusian
- Born: 6 May 1977 (age 47); Mahilyow, Soviet Union

Sport
- Sport: Cross-country skiing

Nataliya Sviridova-Kalinovskaya (born 6 May 1977) is a Belarusian cross-country skier. She competed in three events at the 2002 Winter Olympics.
