= Nataliya Moroz =

Belarusian biathlete (born 1976)

Personal information
- Native name: Наталья Владимировна Мороз (-Мурщакина)
- Full name: Nataliya Vladimirovna Moroz (-Murshchakina)
- Nationality: Belarusian
- Born: 19 April 1976 (age 48); Polatsk, Vitebsk, Belarus
- Height: 173 cm (5 ft 8 in)
- Weight: 63 kg (139 lb)

Sport
- Country: Belarus
- Sport: Biathlon

Nataliya Vladimirovna Moroz (Наталья Владимировна Мороз, born 19 April 1976), also using the surname Murshchakina (Мурщакина), is a Belarusian biathlete. She competed in the two events at the 1998 Winter Olympics.
