= Konstantin Zakharov =

Konstantin Zakharov may refer to:

- Konstantin Zakharov (ice hockey)
- Konstantin Zakharov (politician)
