= Lyudmila Korolik =

Belarusian cross-country skier (born 1975)

Personal information
- Nationality: Belarusian
- Born: 15 November 1975 (age 49); Minsk, Soviet Union

Sport
- Sport: Cross-country skiing

Lyudmila Korolik (born 15 November 1975) is a Belarusian cross-country skier. She competed at the 1998 Winter Olympics and the 2006 Winter Olympics.
