= Roman Virolainen =

Russian cross-country skier (born 1981)

Roman Virolainen (Russian: Роман Виролайнен, Belarusian: Раман Віралайнэн; Raman Virałainen and Finnish: Roman Virolainen; born 28 July 1981) is a Russian cross-country skier. He participated at the 2002 Winter Olympics in Salt Lake City, where he represented Belarus. He placed 13th in the 15 km, and also competed in the sprint, 10 km pursuit, and the relay.

== Personal life ==
Born in Petrozavodsk, Virolainen is of Ingrian Finnish descent. He has three children with his wife, Daria Virolainen, a Russian and Finnish biathlete. The family moved to Finland in 2016. Their son, Daniel Virolainen, has competed in SM-hiihdot, the national cross-country skiing championships in Finland.
