= Ekaterina Rudakova =

Belarusian cross-country skier (born 1984)

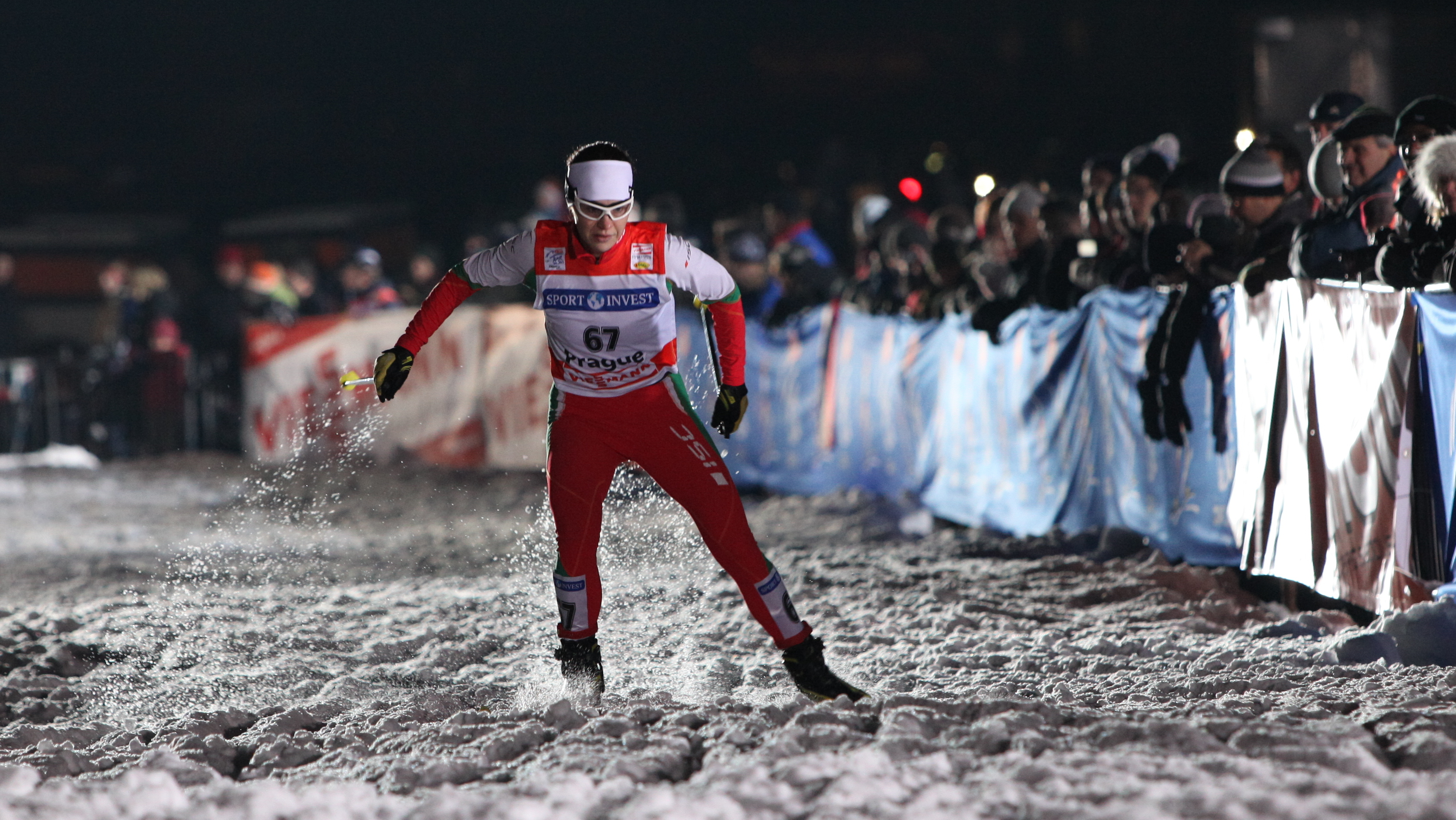
Ekaterina Rudakova in 2010

Ekaterina Rudakova (born January 23, 1984) is a Belarusian cross-country skier who has competed since 2003. Competing in two Winter Olympics, she earned her best finish of 11th in the 4 x 5 km relay at Vancouver in 2010 while earning her best individual finish of 49th in the 7.5 km + 7.5 km double pursuit event at Turin in 2006.

At the FIS Nordic World Ski Championships 2009 in Liberec, Rudakova finished tenth in the 4 x 5 km relay, 32nd in the 30 km, and 44th in the 7.5 km + 7.5 km double pursuit events.

Her best World Cup finish was 13th in a 4 x 5 km relay in France in 2006 while her best individual finish was 37th at a 10 km event in Switzerland in 2009.
