= Igor Makovetsky =

Belarusian speed skater

Personal information
- Nationality: Belarusian
- Born: 29 February 1984 (age 41); Minsk, Belarus

Sport
- Sport: Speed skating

Igor Makovetsky (born 29 February 1984) is a Belarusian speed skater. He competed in two events at the 2002 Winter Olympics.
