= Yelena Kalugina =

Belarusian cross-country skier (born 1972)

Personal information
- Nationality: Belarusian
- Born: 22 May 1972 (age 52); Nolinsk, Soviet Union

Sport
- Sport: Cross-country skiing

Yelena Kalugina (born 22 May 1972) is a Belarusian cross-country skier who competed in three events at the 2002 Winter Olympics.
