= Cristian Saracco =

Italian cross-country skier

Personal information
- Nationality: Italy
- Born: 11 April 1976 (age 50) Turin, Italy

Sport
- Sport: Skiing
- Club: G.S. Fiamme Gialle

World Cup career
- Seasons: 7 – (1999, 2001–2006)
- Indiv. starts: 49
- Indiv. podiums: 0
- Team starts: 8
- Team podiums: 0
- Overall titles: 0 – (63rd in 2004)
Medal record
Men's cross-country skiing
Representing Italy
Junior World Championships
| Silver medal – second place | 1996 Asiago | 4 × 10 km relay |

Cristian Saracco (born 11 April 1976) is an Italian cross-country skier. He competed in the men's 15 kilometre classical event at the 2002 Winter Olympics.

== Cross-country skiing results ==
All results are sourced from the International Ski Federation (FIS).

=== Olympic Games ===
| Year | Age | 15 km | Pursuit | 30 km | 50 km | Sprint | 4 × 10 km relay | Team sprint |
|---|---|---|---|---|---|---|---|---|
| 2002 | 25 | 28 | — | — | — | — | — | —N/a |
| 2006 | 29 | 40 | — | —N/a | — | — | — | — |

=== World Championships ===
| Year | Age | 15 km | Pursuit | 30 km | 50 km | Sprint | 4 × 10 km relay | Team sprint |
|---|---|---|---|---|---|---|---|---|
| 2003 | 26 | 36 | — | 14 | 22 | — | — | —N/a |
| 2005 | 28 | — | — | —N/a | 28 | — | — | — |

=== World Cup ===
==== Season standings ====
| Season | Age | | | | |
| Season | Age | Overall | Distance | Long Distance | Sprint |
|---|---|---|---|---|---|
| 1999 | 22 | 103 | —N/a | NC | 97 |
| 2001 | 24 | 124 | —N/a | —N/a | NC |
| 2002 | 25 | 93 | —N/a | —N/a | NC |
| 2003 | 26 | 71 | —N/a | —N/a | NC |
| 2004 | 27 | 63 | 40 | —N/a | — |
| 2005 | 28 | 96 | 63 | —N/a | — |
| 2006 | 29 | NC | NC | —N/a | — |
