= Lyudmila Kostyukevich =

Belarusian speed skater

Personal information
- Nationality: Belarusian
- Born: 8 July 1964 (age 60)

Sport
- Sport: Speed skating

Lyudmila Aleksandrovna Kostyukevich (Russian: Людмила Александровна Костюкевич; born 8 July 1964) is a Belarusian former speed skater. She competed in two events at the 1998 Winter Olympics.
