= Aleksandr Shalak =

Belarusian cross-country skier (born 1980)

Aleksandr Shalak (born 1980) is a Belarusian cross-country skier. He represented Belarus at the 2002 Winter Olympics in Salt Lake City, where he competed in 15 km, 50 km and sprint.
