= Vera Zyatikova =

Belarusian skier (born 1974)

Personal information
- Nationality: Belarus
- Born: 5 May 1974 (age 52) Kemerovo, Russian SFSR, Soviet Union

Sport
- Sport: Skiing

World Cup career
- Seasons: 6 – (1998, 2001–2005)
- Indiv. starts: 26
- Indiv. podiums: 0
- Team starts: 10
- Team podiums: 0
- Overall titles: 0 – (58th in 2003)
- Discipline titles: 0

Vera Zyatikova (born 5 May 1974) is a Belarusian-Russian cross-country skier. She competed in four events at the 2002 Winter Olympics.

== Cross-country skiing results ==
All results are sourced from the International Ski Federation (FIS).

=== Olympic Games ===
Year	Age	10 km	15 km	Pursuit	30 km	Sprint	4 × 5 km relay
2002	27	27	17	32	DNS	—	5

=== World Championships ===
Year	Age	10 km	15 km	Pursuit	30 km	Sprint	4 × 5 km relay
2003	28	—	12	35	21	—	5

=== World Cup ===
==== Season standings ====
Season	Age				
Season	Age	Overall	Distance	Long Distance	Sprint
1998	23	NC	—N/a	NC	—
2001	26	74	—N/a	—N/a	—
2002	27	64	—N/a	—N/a	56
2003	28	58	—N/a	—N/a	—
2004	29	76	59	—N/a	—
2005	30	NC	NC	—N/a	—
