= Aleksey Khatylyov =

Belarusian speed skater

Personal information
- Nationality: Belarusian
- Born: 17 July 1983 (age 41)

Sport
- Sport: Speed skating

Aleksey Khatylyov (born 17 July 1983) is a Belarusian speed skater. He competed in three events at the 2002 Winter Olympics.
