= Aleksandr Sinyavsky =

Belarusian ski jumper

Personal information
- Nationality: Belarusian
- Born: 9 March 1977 (age 48)

Sport
- Sport: Ski jumping

Aleksandr Sinyavsky (born 9 March 1977) is a Belarusian ski jumper. He competed at the 1994 Winter Olympics and the 1998 Winter Olympics.
