= Svetlana Kamotskaya =

Belarusian cross-country skier (born 1964)

Personal information
- Nationality: Belarusian
- Born: 9 January 1964 (age 62) Khmelnytskyi, Ukrainian SSR, Soviet Union

Sport
- Sport: Cross-country skiing

Svetlana Kamotskaya (born 9 January 1964) is a Belarusian cross-country skier. She competed at the 1994 Winter Olympics and the 1998 Winter Olympics.
