= Natalia Ryzhenkova =

Belarusian biathlete (born 1972)

Personal information
- Nationality: Belarusian
- Born: 7 July 1972 (age 52)

Sport
- Sport: Biathlon

Natalia Ryzhenkova (born 7 July 1972) is a Belarusian biathlete. She competed at the 1994 Winter Olympics and the 1998 Winter Olympics.
