= Vasily Vorobyov =

Belarusian freestyle skier

Personal information
- Nationality: Belarusian
- Born: 25 May 1971 (age 53); Minsk, Belarus

Sport
- Sport: Freestyle skiing

Vasily Vorobyov (born 25 May 1971) is a Belarusian freestyle skier. He competed at the 1994 Winter Olympics and the 1998 Winter Olympics.
