= 1992–93 Belarusian Extraliga season =

Ice hockey season

1992–93 Extraliga
- League: Extraliga
- Sport: Ice hockey
- Teams: 4

Regular season
- Champions: Dinamo Minsk
- Runners-up: HK Neman Grodno

Belarusian Extraliga seasons
- 1993–94 →

The 1992–93 Belarusian Extraliga season was the first season of the Belarusian Extraliga, the top level of ice hockey in Belarus. Four teams participated in the league, and Dinamo Minsk won the championship.

== Standings ==
	Club	G	Pts
1.	Dinamo Minsk	12	19
2.	HK Neman Grodno	12	18
3.	Khimik Novopolotsk	12	11
4.	Khimik Novopolotsk II	12	0
