= 1993–94 Belarusian Extraliga season =

Ice hockey season

94 Extraliga
- League: Extraliga
- Sport: Ice hockey
- Teams: 5

Regular season
- Champions: Tivali Minsk
- Runners-up: HC Neman Grodno

Belarusian Extraliga seasons
- ← 1992–93 1994–95 →

The 1994 Belarusian Extraliga season was the second season of the Belarusian Extraliga, the top level of ice hockey in Belarus. Five teams participated in the league, and Tivali Minsk won the championship.

== Standings ==
	Club	G	W	T	L	GF:GA	Pts
1.	Tivali Minsk	16	15	1	0	95:28	31
2.	HC Neman Grodno	16	10	1	5	74:58	21
3.	Khimik Novopolotsk	16	10	0	6	76:49	20
4.	HK Torpedo Minsk	16	3	1	12	50:90	7
5.	SDYuShOR Yunost Minsk	16	0	1	15	37:107	1
