= Ruslan Salei =

Belarusian ice hockey player (1974–2011)

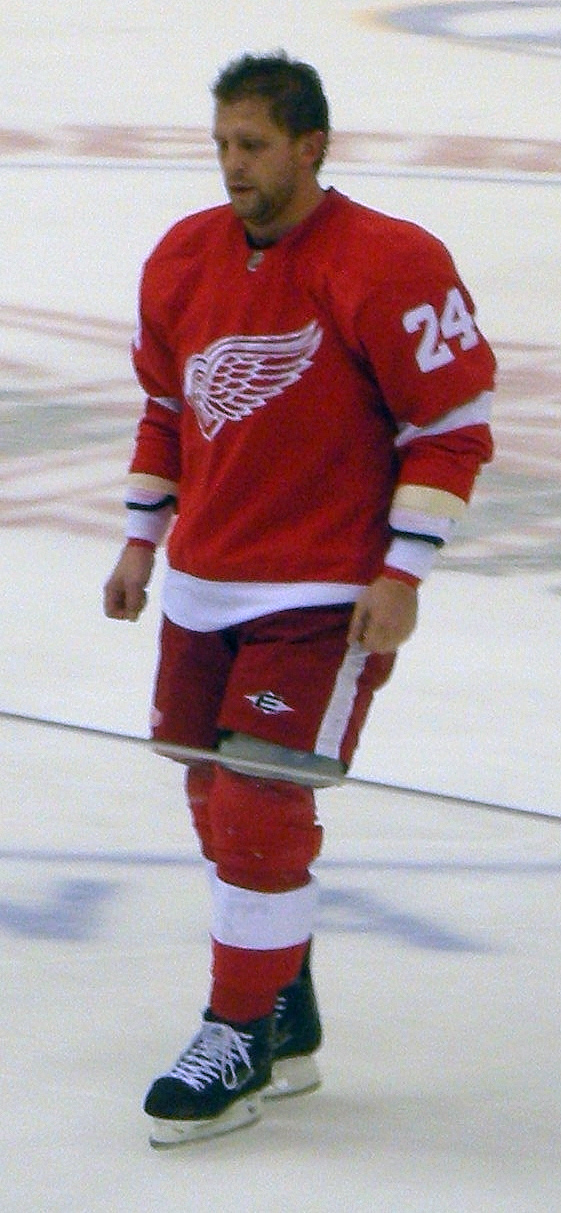
- Salei while with the Detroit Red Wings.
- Born: November 2, 1974 Minsk, Byelorussian SSR, Soviet Union
- Died: September 7, 2011 (aged 36) Yaroslavl, Russia
- Height: 6 ft 1 in (185 cm)
- Weight: 212 lb (96 kg; 15 st 2 lb)
- Position: Defence
- Shot: Left
- Played for: Dinamo Minsk; Tivali Minsk; Mighty Ducks of Anaheim; Ak Bars Kazan; Florida Panthers; Colorado Avalanche; Detroit Red Wings
- National team: Belarus
- NHL draft: 9th overall, 1996; Mighty Ducks of Anaheim
- Playing career: 1992–2011

Ruslan Albertovich Salei (Belarusian: Руслан Альбертавіч Салей; Russian: Руслан Альбертович Салей; November 2, 1974 – September 7, 2011) was a Belarusian professional ice hockey player. Salei played 14 seasons in the National Hockey League (NHL) for the Detroit Red Wings, Colorado Avalanche, Florida Panthers and the Mighty Ducks of Anaheim, the latter of which selected him ninth overall in the 1996 NHL entry draft.

Salei died on September 7, 2011, in the Lokomotiv Yaroslavl plane crash. A Yakovlev Yak-42 passenger aircraft, carrying almost the entire Lokomotiv Yaroslavl team of the Kontinental Hockey League (KHL), crashed near Yaroslavl, Russia, en route to Minsk, Belarus, to start the 2011–12 KHL season. He was posthumously inducted into the IIHF Hall of Fame in 2014.

== Playing career ==
Salei was selected by the Mighty Ducks of Anaheim ninth overall at the 1996 NHL entry draft. In 1992, prior to being selected for the Ducks, Salei played in his native Belarus for Dinamo Minsk in the Russian Elite League. After the 1994–95 season, the Russian Elite League re-aligned, pushing Tivali Minsk to the side. Salei then came to North America, being signed by general manager Bob Strumm of the Las Vegas Thunder without Strumm knowing of his capabilities.

During a successful spell with the Thunder, Salei was drafted by the Ducks and soon signed a three-year contract worth $2.25 million. Salei split time between the Ducks, Baltimore Bandits and the Cincinnati Mighty Ducks of the American Hockey League (AHL) before becoming a full squad member of the Ducks by the end of the 1997–98 season.

In October 1999, Salei was suspended by the NHL for ten games after he checked Dallas Stars center Mike Modano face first into the boards from behind. Modano suffered a slight concussion, strained ligaments in his neck and a broken nose. Salei played in all 21 of Anaheim's games in the 2003 Stanley Cup playoffs, which saw the Ducks advance to the Stanley Cup Finals, only to lose in seven games to the New Jersey Devils. Salei scored the overtime game-winning goal in Game 3 of that series.

During the 2004–05 NHL lockout, Salei played in the Russian Superleague (RSL) for AK Bars Kazan. He returned to the Ducks upon resumption of the NHL the following season and played with the Ducks until the end of the 2005–06 season, playing 594 regular season games in his career for Anaheim, the franchise record for a defenceman (since surpassed by Cam Fowler).

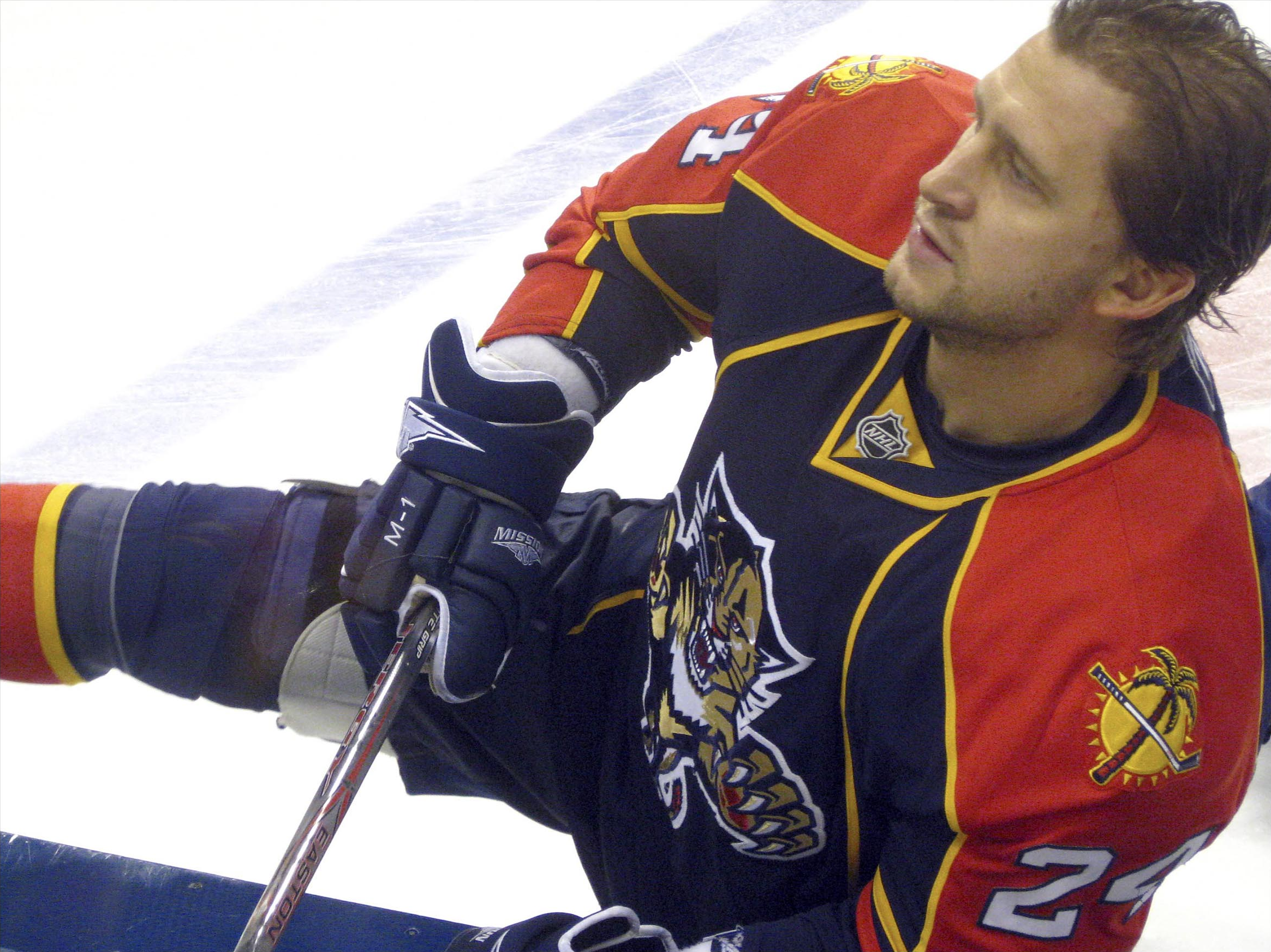
Salei on November 15, 2007, with the Florida Panthers.

On July 2, 2006, Salei signed a four-year, $12 million contract with the Florida Panthers. He quickly settled with the Panthers with his most productive season in 2006–07, totalling 32 points (6 goals and 26 assists) in 82 regular season games. He continued his new-found offensive production in 2007–08, and as the Panthers fell out of contention for the 2008 playoffs, on February 26, 2008, Salei was traded at the NHL trade deadline to the Colorado Avalanche in exchange for Kārlis Skrastiņš and a third-round draft pick.

As a veteran and in his first full season with the Avalanche in 2008–09, Salei finished second among defencemen with 21 points in 70 games. He appeared in his 800th career NHL game against the St. Louis Blues on January 15, 2009 and surpassed 1,000 career penalty minutes against the Minnesota Wild on March 12, 2009. Ruslan suffered a back injury to start the 2009–10 season, forcing him to miss 56 games. He was able to recover in time to lead Belarus in the 2010 Winter Olympics in Vancouver, but was relegated as a reserve defenceman upon his return to the Avalanche, playing in a career-low 14 games.

On August 9, 2010, the Detroit Red Wings announced that it had signed Salei as a free agent to a one-year, $750,000 contract worth an additional $350,000 in potential performance bonuses. According to Red Wings general manager Ken Holland, Salei's positive experiences under then Red Wings head coach Mike Babcock (Salei's former head coach in Anaheim) contributed to his decision. Salei scored two goals paired with eight assists during that season, as well as one goal during the 2011 playoffs in Detroit's first-round matchup against the Phoenix Coyotes.

On July 5, 2011, Salei signed a one-year contract with Lokomotiv Yaroslavl of the Kontinental Hockey League (KHL).

== Death ==
On September 7, 2011, at 4:02 PM local time, a Yakovlev Yak-42 passenger aircraft, carrying nearly the entire Lokomotiv Yaroslavl hockey team, crashed near Yaroslavl, Russia, en route to Minsk, Belarus, to begin the 2011–12 season. Of the 45 passengers and crew on board, 44 were killed, including Salei.

== Awards ==
- Belarus player of the year (2003, 2004)
- IIHF Hall of Fame inductee (2014)

== Career statistics ==
=== Regular season and playoffs ===
			Regular season					Playoffs
Season	Team	League	GP	G	A	Pts	PIM	GP	G	A	Pts	PIM
1990–91	Progress Grodno	URS.2	1	0	0	0	0	—	—	—	—	—
1991–92	Neman Grodno	CIS.2	6	0	0	0	0	—	—	—	—	—
1992–93	Dinamo Minsk	RUS	9	1	0	1	10	—	—	—	—	—
1992–93	Neman Grodno	RUS.2	28	4	2	6	20	—	—	—	—	—
1992–93	Tivali Minsk	BLR	11	2	0	2	6	—	—	—	—	—
1993–94	Tivali Minsk	RUS	39	2	3	5	50	—	—	—	—	—
1993–94	Tivali Minsk	BLR	16	1	2	3	20	—	—	—	—	—
1994–95	Tivali Minsk	RUS	51	4	2	6	44	—	—	—	—	—
1994–95	Tivali Minsk	BLR	10	3	5	8	2	—	—	—	—	—
1995–96	Las Vegas Thunder	IHL	76	7	23	30	123	15	3	7	10	18
1996–97	Las Vegas Thunder	IHL	8	0	2	2	24	3	2	1	3	6
1996–97	Baltimore Bandits	AHL	12	1	4	5	12	—	—	—	—	—
1996–97	Mighty Ducks of Anaheim	NHL	30	0	1	1	37	—	—	—	—	—
1997–98	Cincinnati Mighty Ducks	AHL	6	3	6	9	14	—	—	—	—	—
1997–98	Mighty Ducks of Anaheim	NHL	66	5	10	15	70	—	—	—	—	—
1998–99	Mighty Ducks of Anaheim	NHL	74	2	14	16	65	3	0	0	0	4
1999–2000	Mighty Ducks of Anaheim	NHL	71	5	5	10	94	—	—	—	—	—
2000–01	Mighty Ducks of Anaheim	NHL	50	1	5	6	70	—	—	—	—	—
2001–02	Mighty Ducks of Anaheim	NHL	82	4	7	11	97	—	—	—	—	—
2002–03	Mighty Ducks of Anaheim	NHL	61	4	8	12	78	21	2	3	5	26
2003–04	Mighty Ducks of Anaheim	NHL	82	4	11	15	110	—	—	—	—	—
2004–05	Ak Bars Kazan	RSL	35	8	12	20	36	3	0	0	0	2
2005–06	Mighty Ducks of Anaheim	NHL	78	1	18	19	114	16	3	2	5	18
2006–07	Florida Panthers	NHL	82	6	26	32	102	—	—	—	—	—
2007–08	Florida Panthers	NHL	65	3	20	23	75	—	—	—	—	—
2007–08	Colorado Avalanche	NHL	17	3	4	7	23	10	1	4	5	4
2008–09	Colorado Avalanche	NHL	70	4	17	21	72	—	—	—	—	—
2009–10	Colorado Avalanche	NHL	14	1	5	6	10	1	0	0	0	0
2010–11	Detroit Red Wings	NHL	75	2	8	10	48	11	1	0	1	0
NHL totals			917	45	159	204	1065	62	7	9	16	52
RUS totals			99	7	5	12	104	—	—	—	—	—

=== International ===
Year	Team	Event	Result	GP	G	A	Pts	PIM
1994	Belarus	WC C	22nd	6	1	2	3	10
1995	Belarus	WC C	21st	4	0	1	1	4
1997	Belarus	OGQ	Q	4	0	2	2	18
1998	Belarus	OG	7th	7	1	0	1	4
1998	Belarus	WC	8th	2	1	0	1	8
2000	Belarus	WC	9th	6	0	1	1	6
2001	Belarus	WC	14th	6	0	1	1	31
2002	Belarus	OG	4th	6	2	1	3	4
2004	Belarus	WC D1	17th	5	3	4	7	2
2005	Belarus	OGQ	DNQ	2	1	0	1	2
2008	Belarus	WC	9th	5	0	2	2	6
2009	Belarus	WC	8th	6	2	3	5	6
2010	Belarus	OG	9th	4	1	0	1	0
2010	Belarus	WC	10th	6	1	1	2	8
Senior totals				65	13	16	29	91

== See also ==
- List of ice hockey players who died during their playing career

Awards and achievements
Preceded by Chad Kilger	Anaheim Ducks first-round draft pick 1996	Succeeded by Michael Holmqvist
