= Vitaly Novichenko =

Belarusian speed skater

Personal information
- Nationality: Belarusian
- Born: 16 April 1975 (age 49); Minsk, Belarus

Sport
- Sport: Speed skating

Vitaly Novichenko (born 16 April 1975) is a Belarusian former speed skater. He competed at the 1994 Winter Olympics and the 1998 Winter Olympics.
