= Nikolay Semenyako =

Belarusian cross-country skier (born 1976)

Nikolay Semenyako (born 1976) is a Belarusian cross-country skier. He represented Belarus at the 1998 Winter Olympics in Nagano, and at the 2002 Winter Olympics in Salt Lake City.
