= Aleksey Tregubov =

Belarusian cross-country skier (born 1971)

Aleksey Tregubov (born 1971) is a Belarusian cross-country skier. He competed for Belarus at the 1998 Winter Olympics in Nagano, and at the 2002 Winter Olympics in Salt Lake City.
