= Sergei Dolidovich =

Belarusian cross country skier (born 1973)

Sergey Nikolaevich Dolidovich (Belarusian: Сяргей Мікалаевіч Далідовіч, romanized: Siarhei Mikalayevich Dalidovich, Russian: Сергей Николаевич Долидович; born 18 May 1973 in Orsha) is a Belarusian cross-country skier who has competed since 1994. His lone World Cup victory was in a 60 km event in Finland in 2001.

Dolidovich also competed in six Winter Olympics, earning his best finish of 5th in the 50 km event at Sochi in 2014, at the age of 40. His best finish at the FIS Nordic World Ski Championships was fourth in the 30 km pursuit at Oslo in 2011.

== World Cup results ==
All results are sourced from the International Ski Federation (FIS).

=== Individual podiums ===
- 1 victory
- 2 podiums

No	Season	Date	Location	Race	Level	Place
1	2000–01	25 March 2001	Kuopio, Finland	60 km Mass Start F	World Cup	1st
2	2008–09	30 January 2009	Rybinsk, Russia	15 km Mass Start F	World Cup	3rd
