= 2002 World Junior Ice Hockey Championships rosters =

Below are the rosters for teams competing in the 2002 World Junior Ice Hockey Championships.

== Group A ==
=== Slovakia ===
- Head coach: (Slovakia) Július Šupler

| Pos. | No. | Player | Team | NHL Rights |
|---|---|---|---|---|
| GK | 1 | Peter Budaj | (Canada) Toronto St. Michael's Majors | Colorado Avalanche |
| GK | 25 | Peter Hamerlík | (Canada) Kingston Frontenacs | Pittsburgh Penguins |
| D | 3 | Stanislav Hudec | (Canada) Chicoutimi Saguenéens | |
| D | 5 | Karol Sloboda | (Canada) Ottawa 67's | |
| D | 7 | Peter Frühauf | (United States) Topeka Scarecrows | |
| D | 11 | Ľuboš Velebný | (Canada) London Knights | Toronto Maple Leafs |
| D | 19 | Tomáš Malec | (Canada) Rimouski Océanic | Florida Panthers |
| D | 27 | Radovan Sloboda | (Slovakia) HC Slovan Bratislava | |
| D | 28 | Richard Stehlík | (Slovakia) HK 36 Skalica | |
| D | 29 | Milan Jurčina | (Canada) Halifax Mooseheads | Boston Bruins |
| F | 8 | Peter Gajdoš | (Slovakia) HC Košice | |
| F | 9 | Tomáš Jaško | (Slovakia) HC Slovan Bratislava | |
| F | 12 | Tomáš Oravec | (Slovakia) MsHK Žilina | |
| F | 14 | Ivan Koložváry | (Slovakia) HK Dukla Trenčín | Toronto Maple Leafs |
| F | 15 | Marek Svatoš | (Canada) Kootenay Ice | Colorado Avalanche |
| F | 16 | Miroslav Kristín | (Slovakia) HK Dukla Trenčín | |
| F | 17 | Michal Macho | (Slovakia) MHC Martin | San Jose Sharks |
| F | 20 | František Skladaný | (United States) Boston University | Colorado Avalanche |
| F | 21 | Peter Holečko | (Slovakia) HC Košice | |
| F | 22 | Tomáš Kopecký | (Canada) Lethbridge Hurricanes | Detroit Red Wings |
| F | 23 | Igor Pohanka | (Canada) Prince Albert Raiders | New Jersey Devils |
| F | 26 | Michal Kolárik | (Czech Republic) HC Oceláři Třinec | |

=== United States ===
- Head coach: (United States) Keith Allain

| Pos. | No. | Player | Team | NHL Rights |
|---|---|---|---|---|
| GK | 1 | Dwight LaBrosse | (Canada) Guelph Storm | |
| GK | 29 | Jason Bacashihua | (United States) Plymouth Whalers | Dallas Stars |
| D | 2 | Keith Ballard | (United States) University of Minnesota | |
| D | 3 | Ryan Whitney | (United States) Boston University | |
| D | 5 | Erik Reitz | (Canada) Barrie Colts | Minnesota Wild |
| D | 8 | Mike Komisarek | (United States) University of Michigan | Montreal Canadiens |
| D | 13 | Brett Lebda | (United States) University of Notre Dame | |
| D | 26 | Bryce Lampman | (United States) University of Nebraska Omaha | |
| D | 31 | Joey Hope | (United States) Portland Winterhawks | |
| F | 9 | Ben Eaves | (United States) Boston College | Pittsburgh Penguins |
| F | 10 | Chad LaRose | (United States) Plymouth Whalers | |
| F | 11 | Ryan Hollweg | (Canada) Medicine Hat Tigers | New York Rangers |
| F | 12 | Kris Vernarsky | (United States) Plymouth Whalers | Toronto Maple Leafs |
| F | 14 | David Steckel | (United States) Ohio State University | Los Angeles Kings |
| F | 16 | Gregg Johnson | (United States) Boston University | Ottawa Senators |
| F | 17 | Eric Nystrom | (United States) University of Michigan | |
| F | 18 | Rob Globke | (United States) University of Notre Dame | |
| F | 19 | Jim Slater | (United States) Michigan State University | |
| F | 21 | Chris Higgins | (United States) Yale University | |
| F | 22 | R. J. Umberger | (United States) Ohio State University | Vancouver Canucks |
| F | 23 | Dustin Brown | (Canada) Guelph Storm | |
| F | 24 | Dwight Helminen | (United States) University of Michigan | |

=== Sweden ===
- Head coach: (Sweden) Bo Lennartsson

| Pos. | No. | Player | Team | NHL Rights |
|---|---|---|---|---|
| GK | 1 | Jimmy Danielsson | (Sweden) Leksands IF | |
| GK | 30 | Henrik Lundqvist | (Sweden) Västra Frölunda HC | New York Rangers |
| D | 2 | Per Helmersson | (Sweden) Västra Frölunda HC | |
| D | 3 | Adam Masuhr | (Sweden) Brynäs IF | |
| D | 6 | Staffan Kronwall | (Sweden) Huddinge IK | |
| D | 8 | Johan Ejdepalm | (Sweden) Almtuna IS | |
| D | 9 | Lars Jonsson | (Sweden) Leksands IF | Boston Bruins |
| D | 12 | Jörgen Sundqvist | (Sweden) Leksands IF | |
| D | 22 | Magnus Hedlund | (Sweden) Modo Hockey | |
| F | 4 | Pär Bäcker | (Sweden) Färjestad BK | Detroit Red Wings |
| F | 10 | Jonas Nordqvist | (Sweden) Leksands IF | Chicago Blackhawks |
| F | 11 | Martin Samuelsson | (Sweden) Hammarby Hockey | Boston Bruins |
| F | 13 | Jens Karlsson | (Sweden) Västra Frölunda HC | Los Angeles Kings |
| F | 14 | Daniel Widing | (Sweden) Leksands IF | Nashville Predators |
| F | 17 | Gustav Gräsberg | (Sweden) Mora IK | Nashville Predators |
| F | 20 | Daniel Hermansson | (Sweden) Leksands IF | |
| F | 23 | Yared Hagos | (Sweden) AIK IF | Dallas Stars |
| F | 24 | Fredrik Sjöström | (Canada) Calgary Hitmen | Phoenix Coyotes |
| F | 25 | Peter Öberg | (Sweden) Modo Hockey | |
| F | 27 | Joel Lundqvist | (Sweden) Västra Frölunda HC | Dallas Stars |
| F | 28 | Andreas Jämtin | (Sweden) AIK IF | Detroit Red Wings |
| F | 29 | Tim Eriksson | (Sweden) Hammarby Hockey | Los Angeles Kings |

=== Czech Republic ===
- Head coach: (Czech Republic) Jaroslav Holík

| Pos. | No. | Player | Team | NHL Rights |
|---|---|---|---|---|
| GK | 1 | Michal Fikrt | (Czech Republic) HC Litvínov | |
| GK | 2 | Petr Šulan | (Czech Republic) HC Keramika Plzeň | |
| GK | 30 | Lukáš Hronek | (Czech Republic) HC Slavia Praha | |
| D | 3 | Libor Ustrnul | (United States) Plymouth Whalers | Atlanta Thrashers |
| D | 5 | Filip Novák | (Canada) Regina Pats | New York Rangers |
| D | 6 | Jan Hanzlík | (Czech Republic) HC Sparta Praha | |
| D | 7 | Lukáš Krajíček | (Canada) Peterborough Petes | Florida Panthers |
| D | 11 | Miroslav Blaťák | (Czech Republic) HC Continental Zlín | Detroit Red Wings |
| D | 15 | Lukáš Poživil | (Czech Republic) HC Litvínov | |
| D | 22 | Petr Chvojka | (Canada) Medicine Hat Tigers | Montreal Canadiens |
| D | 23 | Tomáš Mojžíš | (Canada) Moose Jaw Warriors | Toronto Maple Leafs |
| F | 8 | Petr Průcha | (Czech Republic) HC IPB Pardubice | |
| F | 9 | Jiří Jakeš | (Canada) Brandon Wheat Kings | Boston Bruins |
| F | 12 | Aleš Hemský | (Canada) Hull Olympiques | Edmonton Oilers |
| F | 14 | Tomáš Plekanec | (Czech Republic) HC Vagnerplast Kladno | Montreal Canadiens |
| F | 16 | Jan Boháč | (Czech Republic) HC Oceláři Třinec | Ottawa Senators |
| F | 17 | Jaroslav Sklenář | (Czech Republic) HCM Slovan Rosice | Toronto Maple Leafs |
| F | 18 | František Lukeš | (Canada) Toronto St. Michael's Majors | Phoenix Coyotes |
| F | 21 | Jiří Hudler | (Czech Republic) HC Vsetín | |
| F | 24 | Michal Vondrka | (Czech Republic) HC České Budějovice | Buffalo Sabres |
| F | 25 | Jiří Novotný | (Czech Republic) HC České Budějovice | Buffalo Sabres |
| F | 26 | Martin Podlešák | (Canada) Lethbridge Hurricanes | Phoenix Coyotes |
| F | 28 | Miloslav Hořava | (Czech Republic) HC Vagnerplast Kladno | |

=== Belarus ===
- Head coach: (Belarus) Vladimir Melenchuk

| Pos. | No. | Player | Team | NHL Rights |
|---|---|---|---|---|
| GK | 2 | Sergei Rogovsky | (Belarus) HK Gomel | |
| GK | 22 | Vitali Aristov | (Belarus) Yunost Minsk | |
| D | 3 | Andrei Korshunov | (Belarus) Neman Grodno | |
| D | 4 | Andrei Bashko | (Belarus) Keramin Minsk | |
| D | 5 | Ruslan Sharapa | (Belarus) HK Brest | |
| D | 7 | Maxim Shimansky | (Belarus) HK Gomel | |
| D | 23 | Yaroslav Maslennikov | (Belarus) Polimir Novopolotsk | |
| D | 24 | Artyom Glinkin | (Belarus) Polimir Novopolotsk | |
| D | 25 | Konstantin Durnov | (Russia) Krylya Sovetov Moscow | |
| D | 26 | Andrei Skripalyov | (Belarus) Polimir Novopolotsk | |
| F | 9 | Ilya Yermashkevich | (Belarus) Polimir Novopolotsk | |
| F | 10 | Vasili Gorbovoy | (Belarus) Polimir Novopolotsk | |
| F | 11 | Alexander Kulakov | (Belarus) Keramin Minsk | |
| F | 12 | Mikhail Klimin | (Belarus) Yunost Minsk | |
| F | 15 | Konstantin Nemirko | (Belarus) Yunost Minsk | |
| F | 17 | Artyom Senkevich | (Belarus) Keramin Minsk | |
| F | 18 | Dmitri Meleshko | (Belarus) Keramin Minsk | |
| F | 19 | Vitali Klimenkov | (Russia) Severstal Cherepovets | |
| F | 20 | Konstantin Zakharov | (Belarus) Yunost Minsk | |
| F | 21 | Andrei Kostitsyn | (Belarus) Polimir Novopolotsk | |
| F | 29 | Stanislav Korobov | (Belarus) Polimir Novopolotsk | |
| F | 30 | Mikhail Grabovski | (Belarus) Yunost Minsk | |

== Group B ==
=== Finland ===
- Head coach: (Finland) Erkka Westerlund

| Pos. | No. | Player | Team | NHL Rights |
|---|---|---|---|---|
| GK | 1 | Kari Lehtonen | (Finland) Jokerit | |
| GK | 30 | Juha Kuokkanen | (Finland) SaiPa | |
| D | 3 | Topi Jaakola | (Finland) Oulun Kärpät | |
| D | 4 | Joni Pitkänen | (Finland) Oulun Kärpät | |
| D | 5 | Mikko Viitanen | (Finland) Mikkelin Jukurit | Colorado Avalanche |
| D | 6 | Olli Malmivaara | (Finland) Jokerit | Chicago Blackhawks |
| D | 8 | Jyri Marttinen | (Finland) JYP Jyväskylä | |
| D | 21 | Tero Määttä | (Finland) Espoo Blues | San Jose Sharks |
| D | 22 | Markus Seikola | (Finland) HC TPS | Toronto Maple Leafs |
| F | 9 | Mikko Koivu | (Finland) HC TPS | Minnesota Wild |
| F | 10 | Sean Bergenheim | (Finland) Jokerit | |
| F | 11 | Kim Hirschovits | (Finland) HIFK | |
| F | 12 | Jarkko Immonen | (Finland) Ässät | |
| F | 13 | Tomi Mäki | (Finland) Jokerit | Calgary Flames |
| F | 14 | Mikko Kankaanperä | (Finland) HC TPS | |
| F | 15 | Tuomo Ruutu | (Finland) Jokerit | Chicago Blackhawks |
| F | 16 | Toni Koivisto | (Finland) Lukko | Florida Panthers |
| F | 20 | Jussi Jokinen | (Finland) Oulun Kärpät | Dallas Stars |
| F | 23 | Janne Jokila | (Finland) Mikkelin Jukurit | Columbus Blue Jackets |
| F | 24 | Pekka Saarenheimo | (Finland) Mikkelin Jukurit | |
| F | 28 | Joni Yli-Torkko | (Finland) SaiPa | |
| F | 29 | Tuomas Pihlman | (Finland) JYP Jyväskylä | New Jersey Devils |

=== Canada ===
- Head coach: (Canada) Stan Butler

| Pos. | No. | Player | Team | NHL Rights |
|---|---|---|---|---|
| GK | 30 | Olivier Michaud | (Canada) Shawinigan Cataractes | |
| GK | 31 | Pascal Leclaire | (Canada) Montreal Rocket | Columbus Blue Jackets |
| D | 4 | Jay Bouwmeester | (Canada) Medicine Hat Tigers | |
| D | 5 | Dan Hamhuis | (Canada) Prince George Cougars | Nashville Predators |
| D | 7 | Nick Schultz | (United States) Minnesota Wild | Minnesota Wild |
| D | 8 | Carlo Colaiacovo | (United States) Erie Otters | Toronto Maple Leafs |
| D | 23 | Jay Harrison | (Canada) Brampton Battalion | Toronto Maple Leafs |
| D | 27 | Mark Popovic | (Canada) Toronto St. Michael's Majors | Mighty Ducks of Anaheim |
| D | 37 | Nathan Paetsch | (Canada) Moose Jaw Warriors | Washington Capitals |
| F | 9 | Jason Spezza | (Canada) Windsor Spitfires | Ottawa Senators |
| F | 10 | Garth Murray | (Canada) Regina Pats | New York Rangers |
| F | 13 | Michael Cammalleri | (United States) University of Michigan | Los Angeles Kings |
| F | 14 | Steve Ott | (Canada) Windsor Spitfires | Dallas Stars |
| F | 16 | Jarret Stoll | (Canada) Kootenay Ice | Calgary Flames |
| F | 17 | Brad Boyes | (United States) Erie Otters | Toronto Maple Leafs |
| F | 18 | Jay McClement | (Canada) Brampton Battalion | St. Louis Blues |
| F | 19 | Scottie Upshall | (Canada) Kamloops Blazers | |
| F | 20 | Brian Sutherby | (Canada) Moose Jaw Warriors | Washington Capitals |
| F | 21 | Chuck Kobasew | (Canada) Kelowna Rockets | Kelowna Rockets |
| F | 22 | Stephen Weiss | (United States) Plymouth Whalers | Florida Panthers |
| F | 34 | Jared Aulin | (Canada) Kamloops Blazers | Colorado Avalanche |
| F | 38 | Rick Nash | (Canada) London Knights | |

=== Russia ===
- Head coach: (Russia) Vladimir Plyuschev

| Pos. | No. | Player | Team | NHL Rights |
|---|---|---|---|---|
| GK | 20 | Sergei Mylnikov | (Russia) Krylya Sovetov Moscow | |
| GK | 30 | Andrei Medvedev | (Russia) HC Spartak Moscow | Calgary Flames |
| D | 2 | Igor Knyazev | (Russia) Ak Bars Kazan | Carolina Hurricanes |
| D | 3 | Vladimir Sapozhnikov | (Canada) North Bay Centennials | Florida Panthers |
| D | 4 | Vladimir Korsunov | (Russia) HC Spartak Moscow | Mighty Ducks of Anaheim |
| D | 5 | Denis Grebeshkov | (Russia) Lokomotiv Yaroslavl | |
| D | 7 | Fedor Tyutin | (Canada) Guelph Storm | New York Rangers |
| D | 8 | Maxim Kondratyev | (Russia) HC Lada Togliatti | Toronto Maple Leafs |
| D | 13 | Anton Volchenkov | (Russia) Krylya Sovetov Moscow | Ottawa Senators |
| D | 22 | Andrei Zabolotnev | (Russia) HC Spartak Moscow | |
| F | 9 | Alexander Suglobov | (Russia) Lokomotiv Yaroslavl | New Jersey Devils |
| F | 10 | Sergei Soin | (Russia) Krylya Sovetov Moscow | Colorado Avalanche |
| F | 11 | Alexander Frolov | (Russia) Krylya Sovetov Moscow | Los Angeles Kings |
| F | 15 | Yuri Trubachyov | (Russia) Severstal Cherepovets | Calgary Flames |
| F | 16 | Alexander Svitov | (Russia) Avangard Omsk | Tampa Bay Lightning |
| F | 18 | Alexander Polushin | (Russia) HC CSKA Moscow | Tampa Bay Lightning |
| F | 21 | Igor Grigorenko | (Russia) HC Lada Togliatti | Detroit Red Wings |
| F | 23 | Stanislav Chistov | (Russia) Avangard Omsk | Mighty Ducks of Anaheim |
| F | 25 | Ruslan Zainullin | (Russia) Ak Bars Kazan | Tampa Bay Lightning |
| F | 26 | Alexander Perezhogin | (Russia) Avangard Omsk | Montreal Canadiens |
| F | 27 | Ivan Nepryaev | (Russia) Lokomotiv Yaroslavl | Washington Capitals |
| F | 28 | Andrei Taratukhin | (Russia) Avangard Omsk | Calgary Flames |

=== Switzerland ===
- Head coach: (Switzerland) Jakob Kölliker

| Pos. | No. | Player | Team | NHL Rights |
|---|---|---|---|---|
| GK | 20 | Tobias Stephan | (Switzerland) EHC Chur | |
| GK | 30 | Matthias Schoder | (Switzerland) ZSC Lions | |
| D | 2 | Beat Gerber | (Switzerland) SCL Tigers | |
| D | 3 | Jürg Dällenbach | (Switzerland) EHC Visp | |
| D | 4 | Beat Forster | (Switzerland) HC Davos | Phoenix Coyotes |
| D | 5 | Severin Blindenbacher | (Switzerland) EHC Kloten | Phoenix Coyotes |
| D | 6 | Tim Ramholt | (Switzerland) ZSC Lions | |
| D | 8 | Lukas Baumgartner | (Switzerland) EHC Kloten | |
| D | 15 | Lukas Gerber | (Switzerland) HC Fribourg-Gottéron | |
| D | 26 | René Back | (Switzerland) EHC Chur | |
| F | 7 | Thibaut Monnet | (Switzerland) HC Fribourg-Gottéron | |
| F | 10 | Fabian Sutter | (Switzerland) HC Davos | |
| F | 11 | Patrik Bärtschi | (Switzerland) EHC Kloten | |
| F | 12 | Deny Bärtschi | (Switzerland) EHC Kloten | |
| F | 13 | Raeto Raffainer | (Switzerland) ZSC Lions | |
| F | 17 | Emanuel Peter | (Switzerland) EHC Kloten | |
| F | 19 | Raffaele Sannitz | (Switzerland) HC Lugano | Columbus Blue Jackets |
| F | 21 | Andreas Camenzind | (Switzerland) HC Davos | |
| F | 22 | Andres Ambühl | (Switzerland) HC Davos | |
| F | 23 | Thomas Nüssli | (Switzerland) EV Zug | |
| F | 27 | Sven Helfenstein | (Switzerland) SC Bern | New York Rangers |
| F | 28 | Thomas Déruns | (Switzerland) HC La Chaux-de-Fonds | |

=== France ===
- Head coach: (France) Dave Henderson

| Pos. | No. | Player | Team | NHL Rights |
|---|---|---|---|---|
| GK | 1 | Landry Macrez | (France) Gothiques d'Amiens | |
| GK | 2 | Jérôme Plumejeau | (France) Ducs d'Angers | |
| D | 6 | Geoffroy Bessard du Parc | (France) Dragons de Rouen | |
| D | 8 | Wilfried Molmy | (France) Reims Champagne hockey | |
| D | 12 | Ghislain Folcke | (France) Français Volants | |
| D | 15 | Mathieu Jestin | (France) Ducs d'Angers | |
| D | 16 | Sébastien Rousselin | (France) Ducs d'Angers | |
| D | 17 | Frédéric Bastian | (Finland) Jokerit | |
| D | 27 | Timo Bayon | (Finland) Espoon Palloseura | |
| D | 30 | Julien Thiery | (France) Reims Champagne hockey | |
| F | 4 | Matthieu Becuwe | (France) Corsaires de Dunkerque | |
| F | 7 | Gaël Guilhem | (France) Reims Champagne hockey | |
| F | 10 | Elie Marcos | (France) Gothiques d'Amiens | |
| F | 11 | Aram Kevorkian | (France) Dragons de Rouen | |
| F | 13 | Mickaël Brodin | (France) Reims Champagne hockey | |
| F | 14 | Simon Petit | (France) Gothiques d'Amiens | |
| F | 18 | Pierre-Yves Albert | (France) Gothiques d'Amiens | |
| F | 19 | Thomas Gueguen | (France) Reims Champagne hockey | |
| F | 20 | Romain Masson | (France) Gothiques d'Amiens | |
| F | 21 | Mickaël Bardet | (France) Gothiques d'Amiens | |
| F | 23 | Yannick Maillot | (France) Gothiques d'Amiens | |
| F | 29 | Francis Ballet | (France) Reims Champagne hockey | |
