= Hořava =

Hořava (feminine: Hořavová) is a Czech surname. Notable people with the surname include:

- Miloslav Hořava (born 1961), Czech ice hockey coach and player
- Miloslav Hořava (ice hockey, born 1982), Czech ice hockey player
- Pavel Hořava (born 1956), Czech politician
- Petr Hořava (physicist) (born 1963), Czech physicist and string theorist
- Petr Hořava (ice hockey) (born 1985), Czech ice hockey player
- Tomáš Hořava (born 1988), Czech football player

There are also several physical concepts named after the physicist Petr Hořava:

- Hořava–Lifshitz gravity
- Hořava–Witten domain wall
