= Ondřej Poživil =

Czech ice hockey defenceman

- Born: 22 April 1987 (age 38) Litvínov, Czechoslovakia
- Height: 5 ft 10 in (178 cm)
- Weight: 179 lb (81 kg; 12 st 11 lb)
- Position: Defence
- Shoots: Right
- DEL2 team Former teams: Lausitzer Füchse; HC Litvínov
- Playing career: 2005–present

Ondřej Poživil (born 22 April 1987) is a Czech-German professional ice hockey defenceman playing for Lausitzer Füchse.

== Career ==
Poživil played 41 games in the Czech Extraliga for HC Litvínov. On 23 August 2012 he left the Czech Republic to sign for the Manchester Phoenix of the English Premier Ice Hockey League. On 19 April 2013 Poživil moved to France to join Scorpions de Mulhouse of the Ligue Magnus.

On 8 October 2015 Poživil joined EV Landshut of the 2nd Bundesliga. On 6 May 2016 he joined ESV Kaufbeuren; and a year later, on 12 April 2017, he joined the Ravensburg Towerstars. After two season with the Towerstars, Poživil signed for Lausitzer Füchse on 8 May 2019.

Poživil played for the Czech Republic in the 2005 IIHF World U18 Championships and the 2007 World Junior Ice Hockey Championships.

== Personal life ==
His older brother Lukáš Poživil also played professional ice hockey.
