= Petr Hořava (ice hockey) =

Czech ice hockey player

- Born: July 22, 1985 (age 39); Kladno, Czechoslovakia
- Height: 5 ft 10 in (178 cm)
- Weight: 174 lb (79 kg; 12 st 6 lb)
- Position: Defence
- Shot: Left
- Played for: HC Kladno; HC Berounští Medvědi; KLH Chomutov; HC Slovan Ústečtí Lvi; Orli Znojmo; HC Oceláři Třinec; HC Sparta Praha; Milton Keynes Lightning; MsHK Zilina; HC Přerov; HC Plzeň; HC Slavia Praha
- Playing career: 2003–2020

Petr Hořava (born July 22, 1985) is a Czech professional ice hockey defenceman. He was born in Kladno, and played for his local team HC Kladno the majority of his career. He comes from a sporting family; he has an older brother Miloslav Hořava (ice hockey, born 1982) who has also played hockey for a living for ages. His father Miloslav Hořava was also a defenceman, and played 80 games for the New York Rangers, and his brother, also named Miloslav played alongside him at HC Kladno. Petr played for various other Czech teams, he played with HC Oceláři Třinec in the Czech Extraliga during the 2010–11 Czech Extraliga season. In 2014 he signed for English side Milton Keynes Lightning

== Career statistics ==
			Regular season					Playoffs
Season	Team	League	GP	G	A	Pts	PIM	GP	G	A	Pts	PIM
1999–00	HC Kladno U18	Czech U18	11	2	0	2	8	1	0	0	0	2
2000–01	HC Kladno U18	Czech U18	41	1	4	5	43	—	—	—	—	—
2001–02	HC Kladno U18	Czech U18	17	0	3	3	44	—	—	—	—	—
2001–02	HC Kladno U20	Czech U20	10	0	1	1	6	—	—	—	—	—
2002–03	HC Kladno U20	Czech U20	46	5	6	11	42	11	0	6	6	12
2003–04	HC Kladno U20	Czech U20	12	0	2	2	0	7	1	2	3	20
2003–04	HC Kladno	Czech	47	0	3	3	36	—	—	—	—	—
2003–04	HC Berounští Medvědi	Czech2	—	—	—	—	—	5	1	0	1	6
2004–05	HC Kladno U20	Czech U20	6	0	3	3	22	10	0	0	0	46
2004–05	HC Kladno	Czech	8	0	0	0	6	—	—	—	—	—
2004–05	HC Berounští Medvědi	Czech2	22	0	1	1	44	3	0	0	0	4
2005–06	HC Kladno U20	Czech U20	5	0	0	0	27	—	—	—	—	—
2005–06	HC Kladno	Czech	18	0	1	1	26	—	—	—	—	—
2005–06	KLH Chomutov	Czech2	2	0	0	0	2	—	—	—	—	—
2005–06	HC Slovan Ústečtí Lvi U20	Czech U20 2	4	1	2	3	0	—	—	—	—	—
2005–06	HC Slovan Ústečtí Lvi	Czech2	14	0	2	2	6	5	0	1	1	2
2006–07	HC Slovan Ústečtí Lvi	Czech2	52	3	8	11	40	12	4	2	6	18
2007–08	HC Slovan Ústečtí Lvi	Czech	42	0	3	3	85	—	—	—	—	—
2008–09	HC Kladno	Czech	46	0	1	1	55	—	—	—	—	—
2008–09	HC Berounští Medvědi	Czech2	6	0	0	0	10	—	—	—	—	—
2009–10	Orli Znojmo	Czech2	45	4	16	20	60	8	1	2	3	22
2010–11	HC Slovan Ústečtí Lvi	Czech2	35	2	9	11	10	11	0	1	1	14
2010–11	HC Oceláři Třinec	Czech	13	0	1	1	8	—	—	—	—	—
2011–12	HC Slovan Ústečtí Lvi	Czech2	24	3	10	13	24	16	3	4	7	18
2011–12	HC Oceláři Třinec	Czech	23	0	4	4	12	—	—	—	—	—
2012–13	HC Slovan Ústečtí Lvi	Czech2	26	2	6	8	30	—	—	—	—	—
2012–13	HC Sparta Praha	Czech	8	0	0	0	2	—	—	—	—	—
2012–13	Rytíři Kladno	Czech	8	0	2	2	4	10	0	1	1	4
2013–14	Rytíři Kladno	Czech	42	0	1	1	38	—	—	—	—	—
2014–15	Milton Keynes Lightning	EPIHL	43	8	29	37	104	3	0	0	0	2
2015–16	MsHK Zilina	Slovak	1	0	0	0	0	—	—	—	—	—
2015–16	HC Přerov	Czech2	27	1	8	9	12	5	0	0	0	14
2016–17	Rytíři Kladno	Czech2	46	0	7	7	34	11	1	1	2	8
2017–18	Rytíři Kladno	Czech2	50	2	15	17	36	5	0	1	1	6
2018–19	Rytíři Kladno	Czech2	41	2	6	8	82	1	0	0	0	0
2018–19	HC Plzeň	Czech	1	0	0	0	0	—	—	—	—	—
2019–20	HC Slavia Praha	Czech2	51	0	5	5	42	2	0	0	0	2
Czech totals			256	0	16	16	272	10	0	1	1	4
Czech2 totals			441	19	93	112	432	84	10	12	22	114
