= Raeto Raffainer =

Swiss ice hockey player

- Born: January 1, 1982 (age 43); Wolhusen, Switzerland
- Height: 5 ft 11 in (180 cm)
- Weight: 194 lb (88 kg; 13 st 12 lb)
- Position: Left Wing
- Shot: Right
- Played for: HC Davos; ZSC Lions
- National team: Switzerland
- Playing career: 2000–2013

Raeto Raffainer (born 1 January 1982) is a Swiss former professional ice hockey player who played in the Swiss National League A. He is currently the Sports manager of HC Davos

== Playing career ==
From 1997 to 2001 Raffainer played for the youth team of HC Davos, and debuted in the National League in 2001 with the Grisons, before moving to Zürich. For the first two seasons in addition to the commitments of the ZSC Lions he was sent on loan to National League B to GCK Lions, a team affiliated to Zürich.

In 2005 he played with SC Bern, which in three seasons came to the final edition of the championship from 2006 to 2007, lost in Race 7 against Davos. In 2008, also he played in a meeting in LNB with the Young Sprinters HC .

From 2008 to 2010 he played with the Rapperswil-Jona Lakers. Back in December 2009 it was announced he signed with HC Ambri-Piotta, with a contract valid until 2012. In December 2011 it was extended until 2014.

At the end of the 2012–13 season Raffainer accepted a three-year contract in the National League B returning to the GCK Lions.

== International play ==
From 2001 to 2002 Raffainer played for the Swiss Under-20 team in the World Junior Championship, at which Switzerland closed in sixth place where he scored two goals in seven matches.

== Executive career ==
In early 2015 Raffainer retired from his playing career to become a manager within the Swiss Federation of hockey as director of national teams.
