= Pavel Hořava =

Czech politician

Secretary General of KDU-ČSL
- Incumbent
- Assumed office April 2010
- Preceded by: Jiří Stodůlka

Personal details
- Born: 22 September 1956 (age 70) Brno, Czechoslovakia (now the Czech Republic)
- Party: KDU-ČSL
- Education: Tomas Bata University in Zlín

Pavel Hořava (born 22 September 1956) is a Czech politician and Secretary General of the KDU-ČSL since 2010. He is member of the party since Velvet Revolution in 1989.
