= Radovan Sloboda (ice hockey) =

Slovak ice hockey player

- Born: 7 November 1982 (age 43) Bratislava, Czechoslovakia
- Position: Defenceman
- Shoots: Left
- Slovak Extraliga team: HC Slovan Bratislava

Radovan Sloboda (born 7 November 1982 in Bratislava) is a Slovak professional ice hockey defenceman who played with HC Slovan Bratislava in the Slovak Extraliga. He also played for HK Skalica, HK Liptovský Mikuláš, HC Šumperk and MsHK Žilina.
