= Miloslav Hořava (ice hockey, born 1982) =

Czech ice hockey player

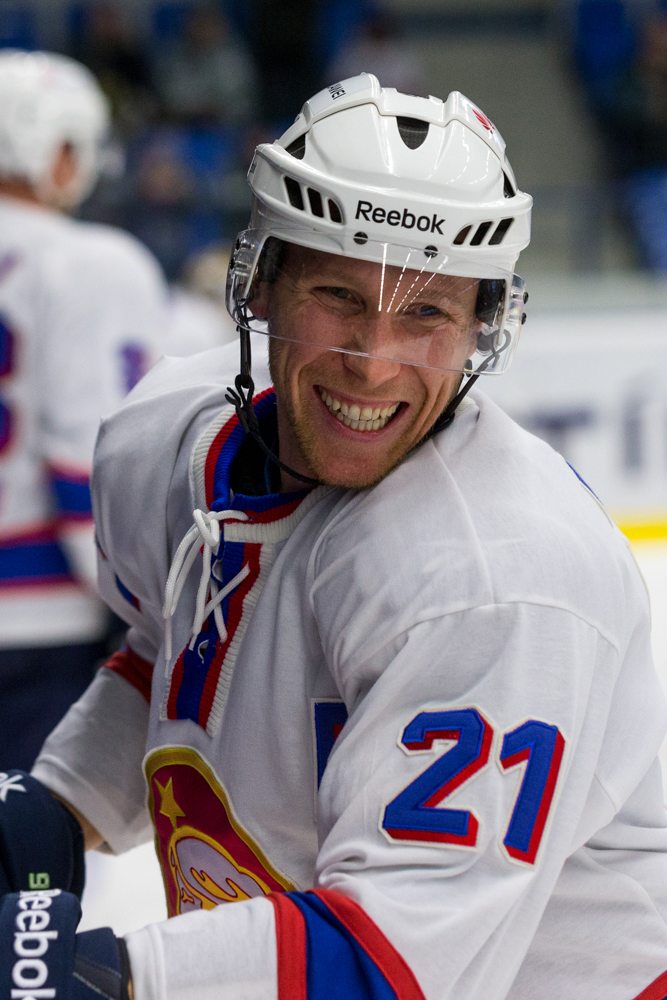
- Born: October 27, 1982 (age 42) Kladno, CS
- Height: 5 ft 11 in (180 cm)
- Weight: 187 lb (85 kg; 13 st 5 lb)
- Position: Right wing
- Shoots: Right
- NLA team Former teams: Genève-Servette HC; MoDo; HC Kladno; Energie Karlovy Vary; Bílí Tygři Liberec; Severstal Cherepovets; Metallurg Novokuznetsk
- Playing career: 2001–present

Miloslav Hořava is a Czech professional ice hockey winger who currently plays for Genève-Servette HC in the Swiss National League A.

Miloslav comes from a talented ice hockey family. He's the oldest son of Miloslav Hořava and an older brother to Petr Hořava (ice hockey).
