= Johan Ejdepalm =

Swedish ice hockey player

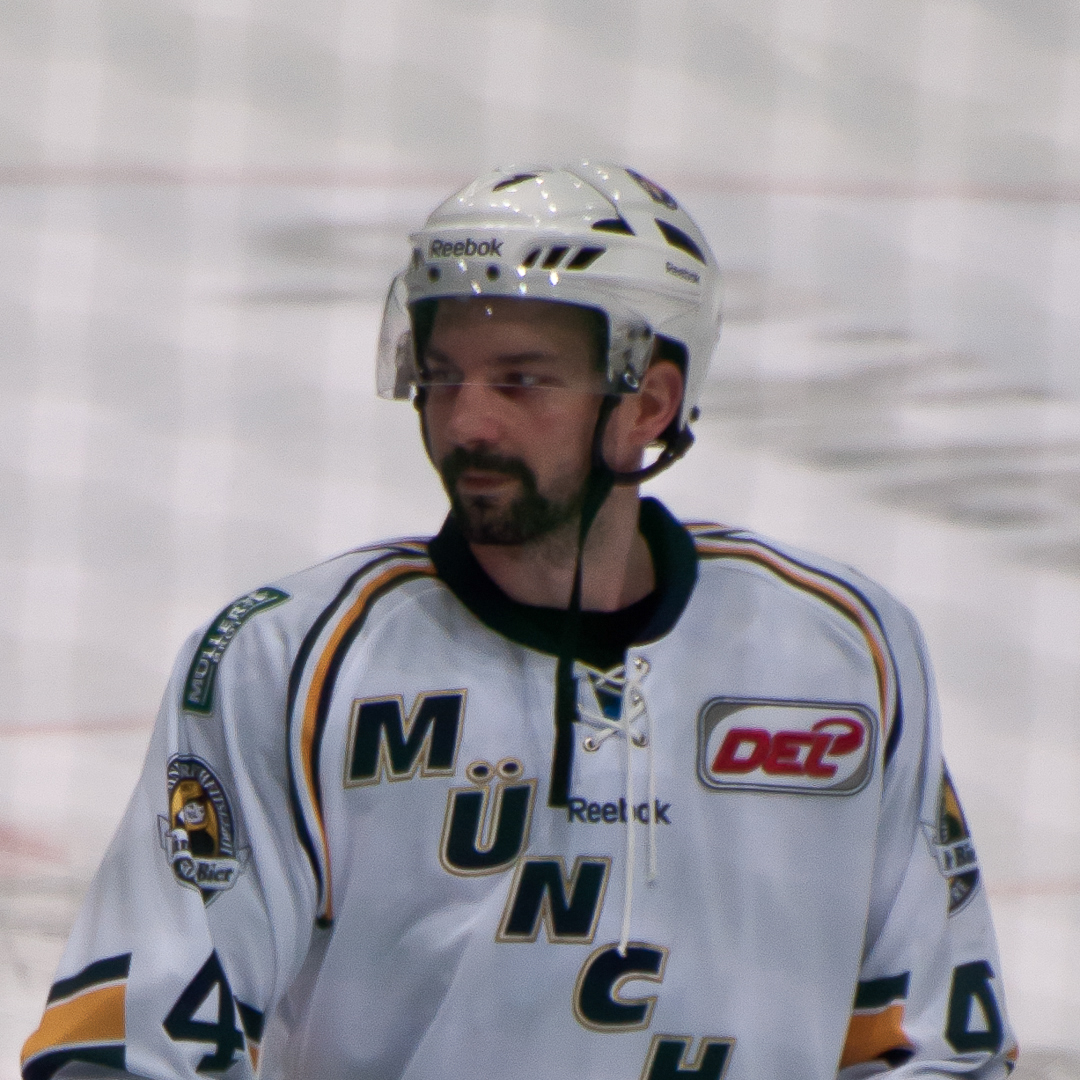
- Born: January 4, 1982 (age 43) Uppsala, Sweden
- Height: 1.84 m (6 ft 0 in)
- Weight: 87 kg (192 lb; 13 st 10 lb)
- Position: Defence
- Shot: Left
- Played for: EHC München; Luleå HF; Hamburg Freezers; Alba Volán Székesfehérvár; Belfast Giants
- NHL draft: Undrafted
- Playing career: 2001–2016

Johan Ejdepalm (born January 4, 1982) is a Swedish former professional ice hockey defenceman.

He formerly played in the Deutsche Eishockey Liga with EHC München. and the Hamburg Freezers

On June 23, 2014, Ejdepalm moved to European neighbouring league, the EBEL on a one-year deal with Hungarian club, Alba Volán Székesfehérvár. In 2015, he signed with the Belfast Giants in the Elite Ice Hockey League (EIHL) for what turned out to be his final season as a player.
