= Yaroslav Maslennikov =

Belarusian ice hockey player

- Born: 23 April 1982 (age 43); Rybinsk, Russia
- Height: 6 ft 1 in (185 cm)
- Weight: 183 lb (83 kg; 13 st 1 lb)
- Position: Defense
- Shoots: Left
- BXL team: HK Gomel
- National team: Belarus
- Playing career: 2000–present

Yaroslav Maslennikov (born 23 April 1982) is a Belarusian ice hockey player who is currently playing for HK Gomel of the Belarusian Extraliga.

Maslennikov competed in the 2013 IIHF World Championship as a member of the Belarus men's national ice hockey team.
