= Lukáš Poživil =

Czech ice hockey player

- Born: September 12, 1982 (age 42); Most, Czechoslovakia
- Height: 6 ft 0 in (183 cm)
- Weight: 194 lb (88 kg; 13 st 12 lb)
- Position: Defence
- Shot: Right
- Played for: HC Litvínov; HC Fribourg-Gottéron; HC České Budějovice; HC Kladno; HC Plzeň
- Playing career: 2001–2019

Lukáš Poživil (born September 12, 1982) is a Czech former professional ice hockey defenceman.

Poživil played in the Czech Extraliga for HC Litvínov, HC České Budějovice, HC Kladno and HC Plzeň. He also played one game for HC Fribourg-Gottéron during the 2005–06 Nationalliga A season.

His younger brother Ondřej Poživil is also a professional ice hockey player.

== Career statistics ==
			Regular season					Playoffs
Season	Team	League	GP	G	A	Pts	PIM	GP	G	A	Pts	PIM
1996–97	HC Litvinov U18	Czech U18	—	—	—	—	—	—	—	—	—	—
1997–98	HC Litvinov U18	Czech U18	43	3	9	12	—	—	—	—	—	—
1998–99	HC Litvinov U18	Czech U18	30	4	5	9	—	—	—	—	—	—
1999–00	HC Chemopetrol U20	Czech U20	48	1	6	7	38	5	0	0	0	2
2000–01	HC Chemopetrol U20	Czech U20	48	7	16	23	116	—	—	—	—	—
2001–02	HC Chemopetrol U20	Czech U20	8	0	3	3	24	6	0	0	0	12
2001–02	HC Chemopetrol	Czech	34	1	2	3	26	—	—	—	—	—
2002–03	HC Chemopetrol	Czech	22	1	0	1	26	—	—	—	—	—
2002–03	KLH Chomutov	Czech2	8	0	1	1	8	—	—	—	—	—
2003–04	HC Chemopetrol	Czech	42	2	4	6	26	—	—	—	—	—
2003–04	HC Most	Czech3	1	0	0	0	0	5	1	2	3	36
2004–05	HC Chemopetrol	Czech	33	2	4	6	18	6	0	0	0	8
2004–05	HC Most	Czech3	2	0	0	0	4	—	—	—	—	—
2005–06	HC Chemopetrol	Czech	49	1	11	12	46	—	—	—	—	—
2005–06	HC Fribourg-Gottéron	NLA	1	0	0	0	0	—	—	—	—	—
2006–07	HC Chemopetrol	Czech	50	3	0	3	68	—	—	—	—	—
2007–08	HC Litvínov	Czech	41	4	3	7	32	5	0	0	0	2
2007–08	HC Most	Czech2	2	0	0	0	0	—	—	—	—	—
2008–09	HC Mountfield	Czech	44	6	8	14	44	—	—	—	—	—
2009–10	HC Mountfield	Czech	38	1	6	7	12	5	0	0	0	2
2010–11	HC Slovan Ústečtí Lvi	Czech2	39	3	14	17	20	14	0	5	5	14
2010–11	HC Kladno	Czech	1	0	0	0	0	—	—	—	—	—
2010–11	HC Litvínov	Czech	4	0	0	0	8	—	—	—	—	—
2011–12	HC Slovan Ústečtí Lvi	Czech2	44	2	12	14	38	12	2	2	4	12
2012–13	HC Slovan Ústečtí Lvi	Czech2	52	11	28	39	61	4	0	1	1	0
2012–13	HC Plzen	Czech	—	—	—	—	—	10	0	0	0	6
2013–14	HC Slovan Ústečtí Lvi	Czech2	1	0	0	0	0	—	—	—	—	—
2013–14	Lausitzer Füchse	DEL2	47	11	15	26	53	5	1	0	1	4
2014–15	Lausitzer Füchse	DEL2	29	3	4	7	18	3	0	0	0	0
2015–16	Lausitzer Füchse	DEL2	38	4	9	13	40	—	—	—	—	—
2016–17	Eispiraten Crimmitschau	DEL2	46	4	7	11	40	—	—	—	—	—
2017–18	Selber Wölfe	Germany3	33	3	20	23	26	11	2	6	8	6
2018–19	Selber Wölfe	Germany3	—	—	—	—	—	—	—	—	—	—
Czech totals			358	21	38	59	306	26	0	0	0	18
Czech2 totals			146	16	55	71	127	30	2	8	10	26
DEL2 totals			160	22	35	57	151	8	1	0	1	4
