= Vladimir Sapozhnikov =

Russian composer (1945–2026)

Vladimir Alekseevich Sapozhnikov (Russian: Влади́мир Алексе́евич Сапо́жников; 20 January 1945 – 11 June 2026) was a Russian composer.

== Life and work ==
From 1973 to 1977 Sapozhnikov taught at the Leningrad Conservatory, then until 1982 at the music college at the conservatory. Later, he taught the composition class of the St. Petersburg Children's School of Arts.

He was a member of the jury of the Petrov All-Russian Composers Competition, as well as the children's music competitions "Young Talents" and "Music is My Soul", and chairman of the jury of the composition competition "Choral Laboratory". He was also the artistic director of the international festival "Land of Children".

He died in Lisy Nos on 11 June 2026, aged 81, when his car was hit by a train.

== Awards ==
- 2004: Laureate Prize of the Government of St. Petersburg.
- 2007: Honored Worker of Culture of the Russian Federation.
