= Daniel Hermansson =

Swedish ice hockey player

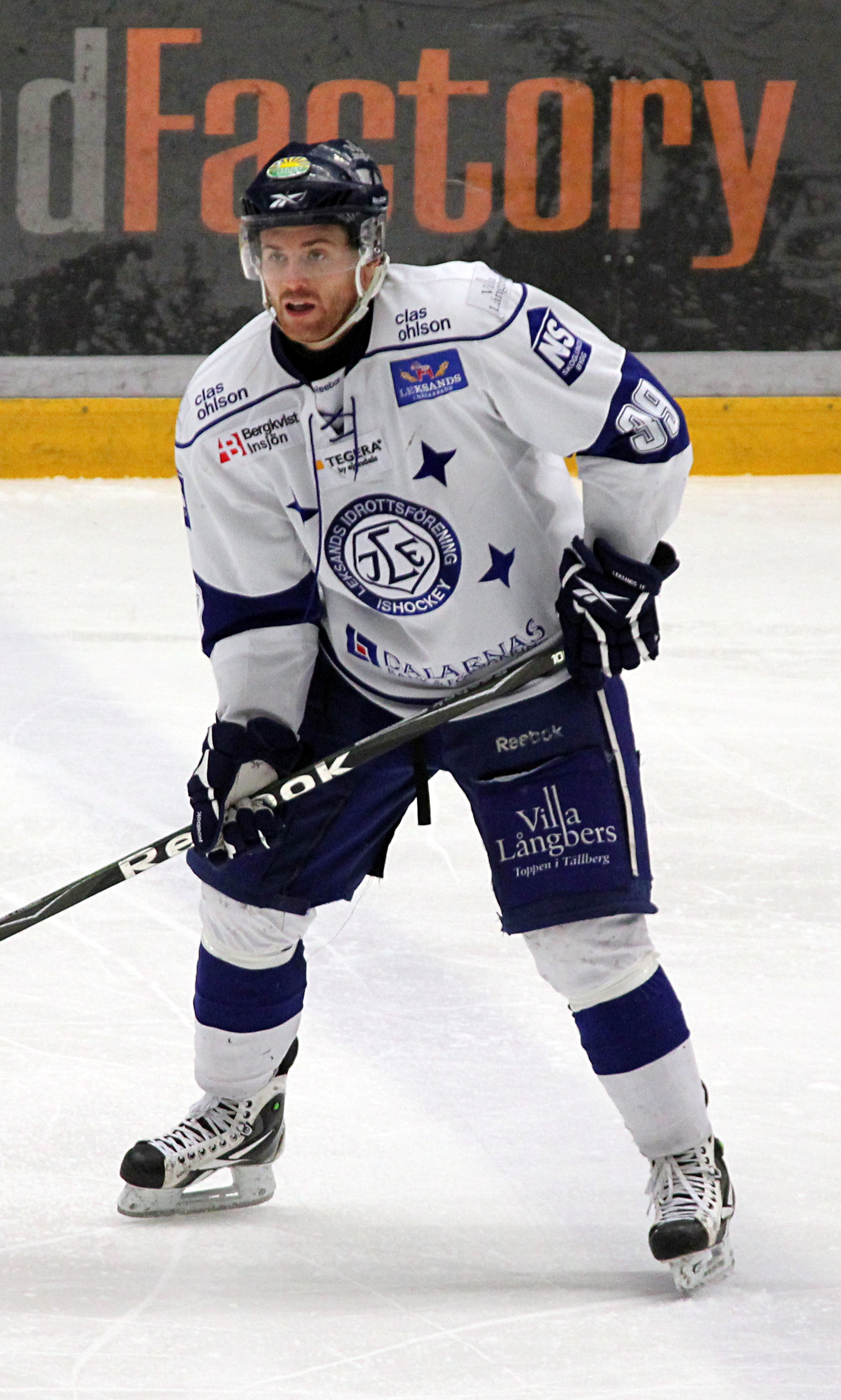
- Born: 3 April 1982 (age 43); Borlänge, Sweden
- Height: 5 ft 11 in (180 cm)
- Weight: 187 lb (85 kg; 13 st 5 lb)
- Position: Right wing
- Shoots: Right
- GET-ligaen team Former teams: Storhamar; Leksands IF; Brynäs IF; Mora IK; Almtuna IS; IFK Arboga IK; Skellefteå AIK
- Playing career: 2000–present

Daniel Hermansson (born 3 April 1982) is a Swedish professional ice hockey forward, who plays for Storhamar of the Norwegian GET-ligaen. He has previously played with Leksands IF and Brynäs IF in the Swedish Hockey League.

On 17 May 2014, Hermansson made his move to Mora IK permanent from Almtuna IS in agreeing to a two-year contract.
