= Miloslav Hořava =

Czech ice hockey coach and player (born 1961)

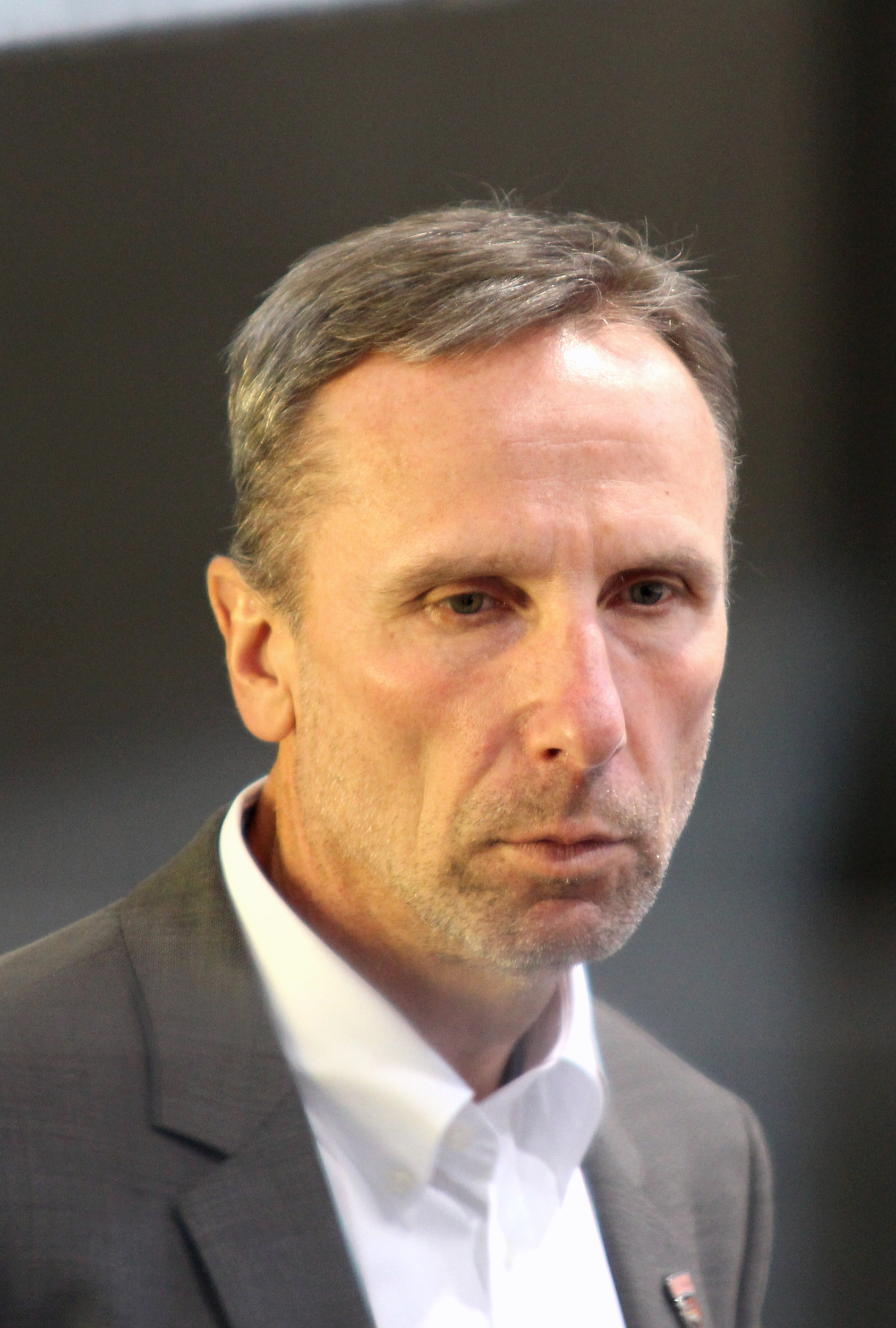
- Born: 14 August 1961 (age 65) Kladno, Czechoslovakia
- Height: 5 ft 10 in (178 cm)
- Weight: 191 lb (87 kg; 13 st 9 lb)
- Position: Defence
- Shot: Left
- Played for: New York Rangers
- National team: Czechoslovakia and Czech Republic
- NHL draft: 176th overall, 1981; Edmonton Oilers
- Playing career: 1981–2000
Medal record
Men's Ice Hockey
Silver medal – second place	1984 Sarajevo	Ice Hockey
Bronze medal – third place	1992 Albertville	Ice Hockey

Miloslav Hořava (born 14 August 1961) is a Czech ice hockey coach and former player. He played on the Silver medal winning ice hockey team at the 1984 Winter Olympics and bronze medal winning team at the 1992 Winter Olympics for Czechoslovakia.

He also played in parts of three seasons for the New York Rangers as a defenceman.

From 2002, he worked as a coach in Czech Extraliga. He was coaching HC Znojemští Orli, HC Pardubice, HC Karlovy Vary and BK Mladá Boleslav. In the beginning of the 2004–2005 season, he returned to the Znojemští Orli, but in 2006, he left and started coaching Czech National U-20 Team.

On 16 April 2009, he signed a two-year contract as the new head coach for Modo Hockey of the Swedish Elitserien, a team where he also played three seasons between 1991 and 1994.

== Career statistics ==
=== Regular season and playoffs ===
			Regular season					Playoffs
Season	Team	League	GP	G	A	Pts	PIM	GP	G	A	Pts	PIM
1978–79	Poldi SONP Kladno	CSSR	19	1	5	6	4	—	—	—	—	—
1979–80	Poldi SONP Kladno	CSSR	41	5	11	16	34	—	—	—	—	—
1980–81	Poldi SONP Kladno	CSSR	44	19	21	40	32	—	—	—	—	—
1981–82	Poldi SONP Kladno	CSSR	44	13	15	28	34	—	—	—	—	—
1982–83	Poldi SONP Kladno	CSSR	42	10	11	21	74	—	—	—	—	—
1983–84	ASD Dukla Jihlava	CSSR	44	5	14	19	28	—	—	—	—	—
1984–85	ASD Dukla Jihlava	CSSR	42	20	22	42	22	—	—	—	—	—
1985–86	Poldi SONP Kladno	CSSR	22	7	5	12	14	—	—	—	—	—
1986–87	Poldi SONP Kladno	CZE-2	31	17	29	46	30	—	—	—	—	—
1987–88	Poldi SONP Kladno	CSSR	37	10	17	27	42	—	—	—	—	—
1988–89	Poldi SONP Kladno	CSSR	32	10	12	22	22	—	—	—	—	—
1988–89	New York Rangers	NHL	6	0	1	1	0	—	—	—	—	—
1989–90	New York Rangers	NHL	45	4	10	14	26	2	0	1	1	0
1990–91	New York Rangers	NHL	29	1	6	7	12	—	—	—	—	—
1991–92	Modo Hockey	SEL	40	3	21	24	60	—	—	—	—	—
1992–93	Modo Hockey	SEL	38	8	25	33	52	2	0	0	0	0
1993–94	Modo Hockey	SEL	29	5	14	19	38	—	—	—	—	—
1994–95	HC Slavia Praha	ELH	38	7	17	24	28	—	—	—	—	—
1995–96	HC Slavia Praha	ELH	37	7	32	39	16	7	0	9	9	12
1996–97	HC Slavia Praha	ELH	42	3	24	27	60	3	0	1	1	0
1997–98	HC Becherovka Karlovy Vary	ELH	24	4	5	9	8	—	—	—	—	—
1998–99	HC Chemopetrol, a.s.	ELH	26	3	12	15	22	—	—	—	—	—
1998–99	HKm Zvolen	SVK	19	1	2	3	14	—	—	—	—	—
1999–00	HC Chemopetrol, a.s.	ELH	44	3	16	19	32	—	—	—	—	—
CSSR totals			367	100	133	233	396	—	—	—	—	—
NHL totals			80	5	17	22	38	2	0	1	1	0
ELH totals			211	27	106	133	166	10	0	10	10	12

=== International ===
Year	Team	Event	GP	G	A	Pts	PIM
1979	Czechoslovakia	EJC	—	—	—	—	—
1980	Czechoslovakia	WJC	5	0	1	1	2
1981	Czechoslovakia	WJC	5	2	3	5	6
1981	Czechoslovakia	WC	8	0	6	6	8
1981	Czechoslovakia	CC	6	2	0	2	2
1982	Czechoslovakia	WC	10	0	1	1	2
1984	Czechoslovakia	OG	7	0	3	3	2
1984	Czechoslovakia	CC	4	0	1	1	15
1985	Czechoslovakia	WC	10	3	2	5	4
1987	Czechoslovakia	WC	10	1	4	5	4
1987	Czechoslovakia	CC	6	1	2	3	4
1988	Czechoslovakia	OG	8	1	2	3	14
1992	Czechoslovakia	OG	6	1	0	1	0
1993	Czech Republic	WC	8	0	3	3	0
1994	Czech Republic	OG	6	0	0	0	8
Junior totals			10	2	4	6	8
Senior totals			89	9	24	33	63

== See also ==
- Ice hockey at the 1992 Winter Olympics
