= Mika Oksa =

Finnish ice hockey player

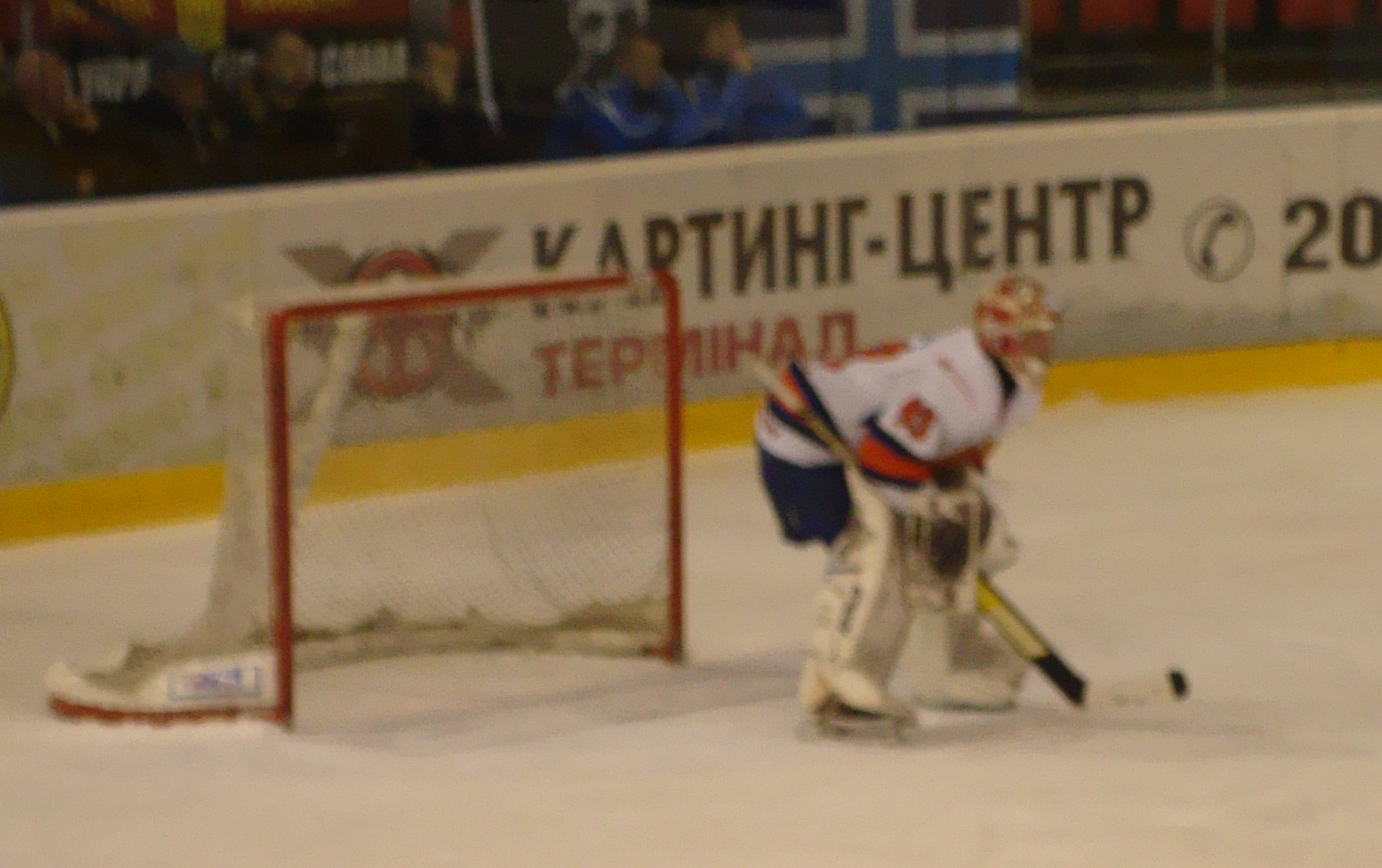
- Oksa in 2010
- Born: 6 July 1976 (age 48); Espoo, Finland
- Position: Goaltender
- KHL team: HC Dinamo Minsk
- Playing career: 1999–2012

Mika Oksa (born 6 July 1976) is a Finnish former professional ice hockey goaltender who played in Finland, Sweden and Belarus. In Belarus he played for both Dinamo Minsk and Yunost Minsk.
