= 2018 IIHF World Championship Group B =

Group B was one of two groups of the 2018 IIHF World Championship. The four best placed teams advanced to the playoff round, while the last placed team is relegated to Division I in 2019.

== Standings ==
Pos	Team	Pld	W	OTW	OTL	L	GF	GA	GD	Pts	Qualification or relegation
1	Finland	7	5	0	1	1	38	11	+27	16 (Note: Finland 6–2 United States)	Quarterfinals
2	United States	7	4	2	0	1	39	16	+23	16	Quarterfinals
3	Canada	7	4	1	1	1	32	12	+20	15	Quarterfinals
4	Latvia	7	3	1	2	1	16	16	0	13	Quarterfinals
5	Denmark (H)	7	3	1	0	3	13	17	−4	11	
6	Germany	7	1	1	2	3	16	20	−4	7	
7	Norway	7	1	1	1	4	13	31	−18	6	
8	South Korea (R)	7	0	0	0	7	4	48	−44	0	Relegation to 2019 Division I A

Source: IIHF
Rules for classification: 1) points; 2) head-to-head points; 3) head-to-head goal difference; 4) head-to-head number of goals scored; 5) result against closest best-ranked team outside tied teams; 6) result against second-best ranked team outside tied teams; 7) seeding before tournament.
(H) Host; (R) Relegated

== Matches ==
All times are local (UTC+2).

=== United States vs Canada ===
4 May 2018; 16:15	United States	5–4 GWS (1–2, 2–1, 1–1) (OT: 0–0) (SO: 1–0)	Canada	Jyske Bank Boxen, Herning; Attendance: 9,632

Game reference

Keith Kinkaid
Goalies
Darcy Kuemper
Referees:
(Czech Republic) Antonín Jeřábek
(Sweden) Linus Öhlund
Linesmen:
(Germany) Lukas Kohlmüller
(Russia) Alexander Otmakhov

	0–1	00:47 – Dubois (Horvat)
	0–2	12:23 – O'Reilly (Bailey)
Lee (Thompson, DeBrincat) – 13:59	1–2
Larkin (Kreider, Oesterle) – 20:43	2–2
Gaudreau (Kane, Coleman) – 30:00	3–2
	3–3	37:53 – Beauvillier (Ekblad, Barzal)
Larkin (Kreider, Atkinson) – 43:27	4–3
	4–4	50:48 – Parayko (McDavid)

Atkinson
Kane (miss)
Gaudreau (miss)
Hughes (miss)
Larkin (miss)
Atkinson
Shootout
(miss) Barzal
Eberle
(miss) Schenn
(miss) Nugent-Hopkins
(miss) Horvat
(miss) Eberle
6 min
Penalties
6 min
25
Shots
44

=== Germany vs Denmark ===
4 May 2018; 20:15	Germany	2–3 GWS (0–0, 1–2, 1–0) (OT: 0–0) (SO: 0–1)	Denmark	Jyske Bank Boxen, Herning; Attendance: 9,982

Game reference

Timo Pielmeier
Goalies
Frederik Andersen
Referees:
(Slovakia) Jozef Kubuš
(Finland) Aleksi Rantala
Linesmen:
(United States) Jake Davis
(Finland) Hannu Sormunen

	0–1	28:44 – J. Jensen (Jensen Aabo, F. Nielsen)
Draisaitl (Ehliz) (EA) – 32:12	1–1
	1–2	35:17 – Storm (Hardt, Larsen) (PP)
Ehliz (Draisaitl, M. Müller) – 50:43	2–2

Hager (miss)
Plachta (miss)
Kahun (miss)
Draisaitl (miss)
Michaelis (miss)
Shootout
(miss) Bjorkstrand
F. Nielsen
(miss) N. Jensen
(miss) Jakobsen
8 min
Penalties
4 min
37
Shots
29

=== Norway vs Latvia ===
5 May 2018; 12:15	Norway	2–3 OT (2–0, 0–1, 0–1) (OT: 0–1)	Latvia	Jyske Bank Boxen, Herning; Attendance: 8,441

Game reference

Lars Haugen
Goalies
Elvis Merzļikins
Referees:
(Russia) Roman Gofman
(Slovakia) Jozef Kubuš
Linesmen:
(United States) Jake Davis
(Canada) Nathan Vanoosten

Bastiansen (Trettenes, Holøs) – 08:14	1–0
Bonsaksen (M. Olimb) – 12:12	2–0
	2–1	26:20 – Balcers (Sotnieks, Galviņš)
	2–2	51:04 – Ābols (Karsums, Rēdlihs)
	2–3	60:24 – Balcers (Džeriņš)

2 min
Penalties
6 min
15
Shots
21

=== Finland vs South Korea ===
5 May 2018; 16:15	Finland	8–1 (2–0, 3–1, 3–0)	South Korea	Jyske Bank Boxen, Herning; Attendance: 8,930

Game reference

Harri Säteri
Goalies
Matt Dalton
Referees:
(Czech Republic) Antonín Jeřábek
(United States) Stephen Reneau
Linesmen:
(Denmark) Rene Jensen
(United States) Brian Oliver

Aho (Teräväinen, Riikola) (SH) – 03:41	1–0
Teräväinen (Aho) (SH) – 05:55	2–0
Aho (Rantanen, Teräväinen) (PP) – 28:46	3–0
Savinainen (Aho, Teräväinen) – 32:21	4–0
	4–1	33:00 – Swift (Radunske)
Nutivaara (Pesonen) (SH) – 38:52	5–1
Mäenalanen (Pesonen, Anttila) – 46:01	6–1
Kapanen (Rantanen) – 47:16	7–1
Pesonen (Mäenalanen, Anttila) – 53:51	8–1

8 min
Penalties
6 min
45
Shots
9

=== Denmark vs United States ===
5 May 2018; 20:15	Denmark	0–4 (0–1, 0–2, 0–1)	United States	Jyske Bank Boxen, Herning; Attendance: 10,800

Game reference

Frederik Andersen
Goalies
Keith Kinkaid
Referees:
(Canada) Brett Iverson
(Germany) Gordon Schukies
Linesmen:
(Norway) Jon Kilian
(Finland) Hannu Sormunen

0–1	16:06 – Butcher (Gaudreau)
0–2	22:42 – Kreider (Ryan, Hughes) (PP)
0–3	29:14 – Atkinson (Kreider, Jensen)
0–4	54:11 – Jensen (Butcher, Kane)

6 min
Penalties
8 min
20
Shots
43

=== South Korea vs Canada ===
6 May 2018; 12:15	South Korea	0–10 (0–2, 0–6, 0–2)	Canada	Jyske Bank Boxen, Herning; Attendance: 3,902

Game reference

Matt Dalton
Park Sung-je
Goalies
Curtis McElhinney
Referees:
(Russia) Roman Gofman
(Finland) Aleksi Rantala
Linesmen:
(Norway) Jon Kilian
(United States) Brian Oliver

0–1	08:41 – Nugent-Hopkins (Schwartz, McDavid)
0–2	17:16 – Jost (Eberle, Barzal)
0–3	21:07 – Parayko (McDavid, Ekblad) (PP2)
0–4	21:57 – O'Reilly (Barzal) (PP)
0–5	22:32 – Dubois (Edmundson, Pageau)
0–6	27:33 – Schenn (Ekblad, Bailey) (PP)
0–7	36:24 – Jost (Horvat, Dubois)
0–8	36:42 – Edmundson (Barzal, Beauvillier)
0–9	44:40 – McDavid (Pulock, Dubois)
0–10	48:55 – Eberle (Edmundson, Jost)

10 min
Penalties
6 min
25
Shots
50

=== Germany vs Norway ===
6 May 2018; 16:15	Germany	4–5 GWS (2–2, 1–1, 1–1) (OT: 0–0) (SO: 0–1)	Norway	Jyske Bank Boxen, Herning; Attendance: 5,491

Game reference

Timo Pielmeier
Goalies
Henrik Haukeland
Referees:
(Canada) Brett Iverson
(United States) Stephen Reneau
Linesmen:
(Russia) Alexander Otmakhov
(Canada) Nathan Vanoosten

	0–1	01:41 – K. Olimb (SH)
	0–2	07:31 – Olsen (Lindström, M. Olimb) (PP)
Hager (Draisaitl, Plachta) (PP) – 14:30	1–2
Michaelis (Noebels, J. Müller) – 18:41	2–2
	2–3	21:36 – Bastiansen (Salsten, Olsen)
Hager (Draisaitl) (PP) – 27:31	3–3
	3–4	50:13 – Sørvik
Y. Seidenberg (Plachta, Draisaitl) – 50:38	4–4

Pietta (miss)
Hager (miss)
Kahun (miss)
Shootout
Trettenes
(miss) Espeland
Lindström
Bastiansen
8 min
Penalties
12 min
44
Shots
37

=== Latvia vs Finland ===
6 May 2018; 20:15	Latvia	1–8 (0–3, 0–2, 1–3)	Finland	Jyske Bank Boxen, Herning; Attendance: 6,174

Game reference

Kristers Gudļevskis
Goalies
Ville Husso
Referees:
(Sweden) Linus Öhlund
(Germany) Gordon Schukies
Linesmen:
(Denmark) Rene Jensen
(Germany) Lukas Kohlmüller

	0–1	01:24 – Aho (Savinainen)
	0–2	07:44 – Savinainen (Heiskanen, Aho)
	0–3	17:16 – Suomela
	0–4	27:31 – Aho (SH)
	0–5	34:49 – Savinainen (Teräväinen, Aho)
	0–6	46:29 – Teräväinen (Rantanen, Granlund) (PP)
	0–7	47:28 – Rantanen (Aho, Teräväinen) (PP)
	0–8	51:10 – Teräväinen (Nutivaara, Aho)
Ri. Bukarts (Balinskis) – 51:38	1–8

10 min
Penalties
10 min
19
Shots
29

=== United States vs Germany ===
7 May 2018; 16:15	United States	3–0 (0–0, 2–0, 1–0)	Germany	Jyske Bank Boxen, Herning; Attendance: 10,301

Game reference

Keith Kinkaid
Goalies
Niklas Treutle
Referees:
(Czech Republic) Antonín Jeřábek
(Finland) Aleksi Rantala
Linesmen:
(Russia) Alexander Otmakhov
(Finland) Hannu Sormunen

Kane (Gaudreau, Atkinson) (PP) – 30:02	1–0
Ryan (Kane, Hughes) (PP) – 32:07	2–0
DeBrincat (Kane) – 50:38	3–0

8 min
Penalties
12 min
36
Shots
24

=== Canada vs Denmark ===
7 May 2018; 20:15	Canada	7–1 (2–0, 3–0, 2–1)	Denmark	Jyske Bank Boxen, Herning; Attendance: 10,800

Game reference

Curtis McElhinney
Goalies
Sebastian Dahm
Referees:
(Slovakia) Jozef Kubuš
(Sweden) Linus Öhlund
Linesmen:
(United States) Jake Davis
(Germany) Lukas Kohlmüller

Bailey (Barzal, Schenn) (PP) – 08:25	1–0
Ekblad (McDavid, Schwartz) – 11:57	2–0
Eberle (McDavid, Parayko) (PP) – 24:16	3–0
O'Reilly (Bailey, Schenn) – 26:53	4–0
Nugent-Hopkins – 27:17	5–0
Nugent-Hopkins (McDavid, Chabot) - 46:43	6–0
	6–1	51:53 – Jensen Aabo (Lauridsen)
Jost (Nurse, Barzal) – 58:10	7–1

6 min
Penalties
6 min
31
Shots
15

=== South Korea vs Latvia ===
8 May 2018; 16:15	South Korea	0–5 (0–2, 0–1, 0–2)	Latvia	Jyske Bank Boxen, Herning; Attendance: 5,227

Game reference

Matt Dalton
Goalies
Elvis Merzļikins
Referees:
(Austria) Mark Lemelin
(United States) Timothy Mayer
Linesmen:
(Norway) Jon Kilian
(Canada) Nathan Vanoosten

0–1	11:46 – Meija (Rubīns)
0–2	18:45 – Ķēniņš (Balcers, Ābols)
0–3	28:22 – Ro. Bukarts (Karsums, Sotnieks)
0–4	41:33 – Balcers (Indrašis, Ābols) (PP)
0–5	59:59 – Ro. Bukarts (Ābols, Indrašis) (PP)

18 min
Penalties
4 min
16
Shots
38

=== Finland vs Norway ===
8 May 2018; 20:15	Finland	7–0 (2–0, 4–0, 1–0)	Norway	Jyske Bank Boxen, Herning; Attendance: 4,617

Game reference

Harri Säteri
Goalies
Lars Haugen
Referees:
(Canada) Oliver Gouin
(Russia) Konstantin Olenin
Linesmen:
(Denmark) Rene Jensen
(United States) Brian Oliver

Savinainen (Aho, Nutivaara) – 04:03	1–0
Anttila – 07:13	2–0
Teräväinen (Granlund, Koivisto) – 21:01	3–0
Kapanen (Heiskanen, Rantanen) – 23:41	4–0
Nutivaara (Rantanen, Granlund) (PP) – 38:18	5–0
Granlund (Teräväinen, Honka) (EA) – 39:45	6–0
Mäenalanen (Manninen) (SH) – 57:45	7–0

8 min
Penalties
8 min
34
Shots
10

=== Germany vs South Korea ===
9 May 2018; 16:15	Germany	6–1 (1–0, 3–0, 2–1)	South Korea	Jyske Bank Boxen, Herning; Attendance: 7,092

Game reference

Niklas Treutle
Goalies
Matt Dalton
Referees:
(Czech Republic) Jan Hribik
(Finland) Mikko Kaukokari
Linesmen:
(Czech Republic) Miroslav Lhotský
(Finland) Sakari Suominen

Draisaitl (Plachta, Y. Seidenberg) (PP) – 10:02	1–0
Ehliz (Plachta, Y. Seidenberg) (PP) – 20:41	2–0
Hager (Holzer, Draisaitl) – 29:27	3–0
Tiffels (Michaelis) – 34:42	4–0
Ehliz (Kahun, Draisaitl) – 48:37	5–0
Y. Seidenberg (Plachta) (PP) – 52:33	6–0
	6–1	57:01 – Radunske (Ahn)

28 min
Penalties
18 min
42
Shots
26

=== Finland vs Denmark ===
9 May 2018; 20:15	Finland	2–3 (0–0, 1–2, 1–1)	Denmark	Jyske Bank Boxen, Herning; Attendance: 10,800

Game reference

Ville Husso
Goalies
Frederik Andersen
Referees:
(United States) Timothy Mayer
(Switzerland) Tobias Wehrli
Linesmen:
(Canada) Dustin McCrank
(Slovakia) Peter Šefčík

	0–1	32:28 – F. Nielsen (Jensen Aabo, Bødker) (PP)
Aho (Teräväinen, Granlund) (PP) – 34:33	1–1
	1–2	37:10 – Bjorkstrand (Bødker, Lauridsen)
Granlund (Koivisto, Nutivaara) – 55:50	2–2
	2–3	58:01 – Hardt (Bødker, F. Nielsen) (PP)

12 min
Penalties
10 min
35
Shots
17

=== United States vs Latvia ===
10 May 2018; 16:15	United States	3–2 OT (1–1, 1–1, 0–0) (OT: 1–0)	Latvia	Jyske Bank Boxen, Herning; Attendance: 5,215

Game reference

Keith Kinkaid
Goalies
Elvis Merzļikins
Referees:
(Canada) Oliver Gouin
(Russia) Konstantin Olenin
Linesmen:
(Belarus) Dmitri Golyak
(Sweden) Andreas Malmqvist

Kreider (DeBrincat, Larkin) (PP) – 11:39	1–0
	1–1	17:52 – Balinskis (Bļugers, Ri. Bukarts)
	1–2	23:20 – Džeriņš (Indrašis, Ro. Bukarts) (PP)
White (DeBrincat, Kane) – 37:38	2–2
Atkinson (Gaudreau, Kane) (PP) – 61:23	3–2

12 min
Penalties
16 min
33
Shots
19

=== Norway vs Canada ===
10 May 2018; 20:15	Norway	0–5 (0–3, 0–1, 0–1)	Canada	Jyske Bank Boxen, Herning; Attendance: 5,139

Game reference

Lars Haugen
Goalies
Curtis McElhinney
Darcy Kuemper
Referees:
(Finland) Mikko Kaukokari
(Austria) Mark Lemelin
Linesmen:
(Switzerland) Nicolas Fluri
(Russia) Gleb Lazarev

0–1	01:23 – McDavid (Parayko)
0–2	12:49 – Horvat (Pageau) (SH)
0–3	15:41 – McDavid (Schwartz)
0–4	28:03 – McDavid (Parayko, Nugent-Hopkins)
0–5	42:24 – Horvat (Dubois)

22 min
Penalties
16 min
10
Shots
33

=== Denmark vs Norway ===
11 May 2018; 16:15	Denmark	3–0 (1–0, 2–0, 0–0)	Norway	Jyske Bank Boxen, Herning; Attendance: 10,800

Game reference

Frederik Andersen
Goalies
Henrik Haukeland
Referees:
(Czech Republic) Jan Hribik
(United States) Timothy Mayer
Linesmen:
(Canada) Dustin McCrank
(Slovakia) Peter Šefčík

N. Jensen (Larsen, Regin) (PP) – 19:13	1–0
N. Jensen (Larsen, Bjorkstrand) (PP) – 26:17	2–0
Storm (Bødker, Jensen Aabo) (PP) – 33:58	3–0

10 min
Penalties
12 min
25
Shots
21

=== United States vs South Korea ===
11 May 2018; 20:15	United States	13–1 (4–1, 4–0, 5–0)	South Korea	Jyske Bank Boxen, Herning; Attendance: 7,563

Game reference

Scott Darling
Goalies
Matt Dalton
Park Sung-je
Referees:
(Sweden) Mikael Sjöqvist
(Switzerland) Tobias Wehrli
Linesmen:
(Czech Republic) Miroslav Lhotský
(Finland) Sakari Suominen

	0–1	05:23 – Ahn (Kim S., Kim Won-jun) (PP)
Lee (Larkin, Gaudreau) – 08:35	1–1
Kane (Gaudreau) (PP2) – 12:56	2–1
McAvoy (Kane, Gaudreau) (PP2) – 13:29	3–1
McAvoy (Kreider, Larkin) – 19:16	4–1
Ryan (Martinez) (SH) – 23:42	5–1
Coleman (Martinez, White) – 27:06	6–1
Kane (McAvoy) (PP) – 28:41	7–1
Atkinson (Kane, McAvoy) (PP2) – 32:18	8–1
Thompson (Milano, Jensen) – 45:06	9–1
Atkinson (Kane, McAvoy) – 46:11	10–1
Pionk (Butcher) – 49:09	11–1
Ryan (DeBrincat, Pionk) (PP) – 51:40	12–1
Milano (Debrincat, Thompson) – 58:50	13–1

10 min
Penalties
22 min
57
Shots
13

=== Latvia vs Germany ===
12 May 2018; 12:15	Latvia	3–1 (0–0, 1–0, 2–1)	Germany	Jyske Bank Boxen, Herning; Attendance: 8,997

Game reference

Elvis Merzļikins
Goalies
Niklas Treutle
Referees:
(Finland) Mikko Kaukokari
(United States) Timothy Mayer
Linesmen:
(Switzerland) Nicolas Fluri
(Sweden) Andreas Malmqvist

Ķēniņš (Ābols, Balcers) – 36:54	1–0
Galviņš (Indrašis, Džeriņš) – 40:15	2–0
Džeriņš (Rēdlihs, Freibergs) – 47:54	3–0
	3–1	48:40 – Kahun (Draisaitl)

4 min
Penalties
14 min
32
Shots
34

=== Denmark vs South Korea ===
12 May 2018; 16:15	Denmark	3–1 (0–0, 2–1, 1–0)	South Korea	Jyske Bank Boxen, Herning; Attendance: 10,591

Game reference

Frederik Andersen
Goalies
Matt Dalton
Referees:
(Canada) Oliver Gouin
(Sweden) Mikael Sjöqvist
Linesmen:
(Russia) Gleb Lazarev
(Canada) Dustin McCrank

F. Nielsen (D. Nielsen) – 22:55	1–0
	1–1	24:18 – Kim K. (Kim S.
Jensen (Bjorkstrand) – 32:14	2–1
Hardt (F. Nielsen, Jensen A.) (PP) – 56:35	3–1

4 min
Penalties
8 min
28
Shots
14

=== Canada vs Finland ===
12 May 2018; 20:15	Canada	1–5 (1–3, 0–0, 0–2)	Finland	Jyske Bank Boxen, Herning; Attendance: 9,313

Game reference

Curtis McElhinney
Darcy Kuemper
Goalies
Harri Säteri
Referees:
(Austria) Mark Lemelin
(Russia) Konstantin Olenin
Linesmen:
(Belarus) Dmitri Golyak
(Slovakia) Peter Šefčík

	0–1	08:50 – Rantanen
Pageau (Horvat) – 10:55	1–1
	1–2	13:48 – Pesonen (Nutivaara, Tolvanen) (PP2)
	1–3	16:35 – Rantanen (Granlund, Teräväinen) (PP)
	1–4	45:17 – Tolvanen
	1–5	45:27 – Teräväinen (Aho)

22 min
Penalties
16 min
31
Shots
22

=== Norway vs United States ===
13 May 2018; 16:15	Norway	3–9 (0–3, 1–4, 2–2)	United States	Jyske Bank Boxen, Herning; Attendance: 4,553

Game reference

Lars Haugen
Henrik Haukeland
Goalies
Keith Kinkaid
Scott Darling
Referees:
(Russia) Roman Gofman
(Switzerland) Tobias Wehrli
Linesmen:
(Czech Republic) Miroslav Lhotský
(Finland) Sakari Suominen

	0–1	08:24 – Kane (McAvoy, Atkinson) (PP)
	0–2	12:18 – Kane (DeBrincat, Atkinson) (PP)
	0–3	15:25 – McAvoy (DeBrincat)
	0–4	21:03 – Larkin (PP)
Forsberg (Lindström) – 27:00	1–4
	1–5	30:38 – Martinez (Larkin)
	1–6	36:40 – Lee (Larkin, Gaudreau)
	1–7	39:08 – Atkinson (Jensen, Kane)
	1–8	42:50 – White (Bonino, Murphy)
K. Olimb (Bonsaksen, Holøs) (PP2) – 46:05	2–8
M. Olimb (Lindström, Bull) – 47:09	3–8
	3–9	57:27 – Pionk (Bonino, Kreider)

10 min
Penalties
22 min
26
Shots
48

=== Germany vs Finland ===
13 May 2018; 20:15	Germany	3–2 OT (0–1, 2–0, 0–1) (OT: 1–0)	Finland	Jyske Bank Boxen, Herning; Attendance: 5,077

Game reference

Mathias Niederberger
Goalies
Ville Husso
Referees:
(Canada) Oliver Gouin
(Czech Republic) Jan Hribik
Linesmen:
(Switzerland) Nicolas Fluri
(Russia) Gleb Lazarev

	0–1	02:26 – Tolvanen (Riikola)
Tiffels (Y. Seidenberg, Michaelis) – 25:56	1–1
Krupp (Hager, Eisenschmid) – 38:48	2–1
	2–2	57:54 – Aho (Granlund, Teräväinen) (PP)
Eisenschmid (Kahun) – 62:00	3–2

6 min
Penalties
4 min
15
Shots
38

=== South Korea vs Norway ===
14 May 2018; 16:15	South Korea	0–3 (0–1, 0–0, 0–2)	Norway	Jyske Bank Boxen, Herning; Attendance: 3,330

Game reference

Matt Dalton
Goalies
Lars Haugen
Referees:
(Canada) Brett Iverson
(Finland) Mikko Kaukokari
Linesmen:
(Belarus) Dmitri Golyak
(Canada) Dustin McCrank

0–1	13:35 – Lindström (M. Olimb, Espeland) (PP)
0–2	46:55 – Valkvæ Olsen (Bastiansen, Espeland)
0–3	50:02 – Holøs (K. Olimb, Thoresen) (PP)

12 min
Penalties
2 min
17
Shots
30

=== Canada vs Latvia ===
14 May 2018; 20:15	Canada	2–1 OT (1–0, 0–0, 0–1) (OT: 1–0)	Latvia	Jyske Bank Boxen, Herning; Attendance: 2,966

Game reference

Darcy Kuemper
Goalies
Kristers Gudļevskis
Referees:
(United States) Stephen Reneau
(Switzerland) Tobias Wehrli
Linesmen:
(Sweden) Andreas Malmqvist
(Slovakia) Peter Šefčík

Beauvillier (Pageau, Barzal) – 02:51	1–0
	1–1	41:50 – Rubīns (Ro. Bukarts, Bļugers)
McDavid (Nugent-Hopkins) – 60:46	2–1

4 min
Penalties
4 min
33
Shots
15

=== Finland vs United States ===
15 May 2018; 12:15	Finland	6–2 (2–0, 1–0, 3–2)	United States	Jyske Bank Boxen, Herning; Attendance: 6,343

Game reference

Harri Säteri
Goalies
Keith Kinkaid
Referees:
(Canada) Brett Iverson
(Sweden) Mikael Sjöqvist
Linesmen:
(Czech Republic) Miroslav Lhotský
(Sweden) Andreas Malmqvist

Aho (Savinainen) – 10:17	1–0
Aho (Nutivaara) – 17:15	2–0
Rantanen (Nutivaara, Granlund) – 37:51	3–0
Anttila (Manninen) – 47:42	4–0
	4–1	51:33 – Kane (McAvoy) (PP, EA)
Kapanen (Tolvanen, Savinainen) (PP) – 53:57	5–1
	5–2	54:44 – Ryan (McAvoy, Kreider)
Aho (Kivistö) (ENG) – 56:45	6–2

8 min
Penalties
10 min
36
Shots
37

=== Canada vs Germany ===
15 May 2018; 16:15	Canada	3–0 (1–0, 1–0, 1–0)	Germany	Jyske Bank Boxen, Herning; Attendance: 6,200

Game reference

Darcy Kuemper
Goalies
Niklas Treutle
Referees:
(Russia) Roman Gofman
(United States) Stephen Reneau
Linesmen:
(Switzerland) Nicolas Fluri
(Russia) Gleb Lazarev

Schenn (Nugent-Hopkins, McDavid) – 00:20	1–0
Nugent-Hopkins (McDavid, Ekblad) – 28:14	2–0
Jost (Edmundson) – 49:48	3–0

4 min
Penalties
6 min
30
Shots
12

=== Latvia vs Denmark ===
15 May 2018; 20:15	Latvia	1–0 (1–0, 0–0, 0–0)	Denmark	Jyske Bank Boxen, Herning; Attendance: 10,800

Game reference
Elvis Merzļikins	Goalies	Frederik Andersen	Referees: (Czech Republic) Antonín Jeřábek (Slovakia) Jozef Kubuš; Linesmen: (Belarus) Dmitri Golyak (Finland) Sakari Suominen
Džeriņš (Indrašis) – 09:14 / 1–0			Referees: (Czech Republic) Antonín Jeřábek (Slovakia) Jozef Kubuš; Linesmen: (Belarus) Dmitri Golyak (Finland) Sakari Suominen
2 min	Penalties	16 min	Referees: (Czech Republic) Antonín Jeřábek (Slovakia) Jozef Kubuš; Linesmen: (Belarus) Dmitri Golyak (Finland) Sakari Suominen
28	Shots	19	Referees: (Czech Republic) Antonín Jeřábek (Slovakia) Jozef Kubuš; Linesmen: (Belarus) Dmitri Golyak (Finland) Sakari Suominen
