= 2018 IIHF World Championship =

2018 edition of the IIHF World Championship

Tournament details
- Host country: Denmark
- Venues: 2 (in 2 host cities)
- Dates: 4–20 May
- Opened by: Margrethe II
- Teams: 16

Final positions
- Champions: Sweden (11th title)
- Runners-up: Switzerland
- Third place: United States
- Fourth place: Canada

Tournament statistics
- Games played: 64
- Goals scored: 384 (6 per game)
- Attendance: 520,481 (8,133 per game)
- Scoring leader: (United States) Patrick Kane (20 points)

Awards
- MVP: (United States) Patrick Kane

The 2018 IIHF World Championship was an international ice hockey tournament hosted by the Danish cities of Copenhagen and Herning, held from 4 to 20 May 2018. The IIHF announced the winning bid on 23 May 2014 in Minsk, Belarus. South Korea made its debut at the World Championship, having played in the lower divisions previously.

Sweden went undefeated at the tournament to win their second consecutive and eleventh overall title after defeating Switzerland in the final. The United States won the bronze medal game, defeating Canada 4–1.

The official mascot of the tournament was a swan, inspired by the Danish writer and poet Hans Christian Andersen's fairytale about The Ugly Duckling.

== Bids ==
There were two bids to host this championship.

- Denmark
  - Copenhagen/Herning

Denmark is the only top-ranked IIHF country that has never hosted the tournament. The proposed arenas were the Royal Arena in Copenhagen and the Jyske Bank Boxen in Herning. Both arenas have a capacity of around 12,000 for hockey games.

- Latvia
  - Riga

Latvia hosted the IIHF World Championship in 2006. The proposed arenas were Arena Riga, and a secondary venue to be built.

The decision was announced on 23 May 2014 in Minsk, Belarus. The final tally was 95-12 in favor of Denmark.

== Venues ==
Copenhagen	2018 IIHF World Championship is located in Denmark	Herning
Royal Arena	2018 IIHF World Championship is located in Denmark	Jyske Bank Boxen
Capacity: 12,500	2018 IIHF World Championship is located in Denmark	Capacity: 12,000

== Qualified teams ==
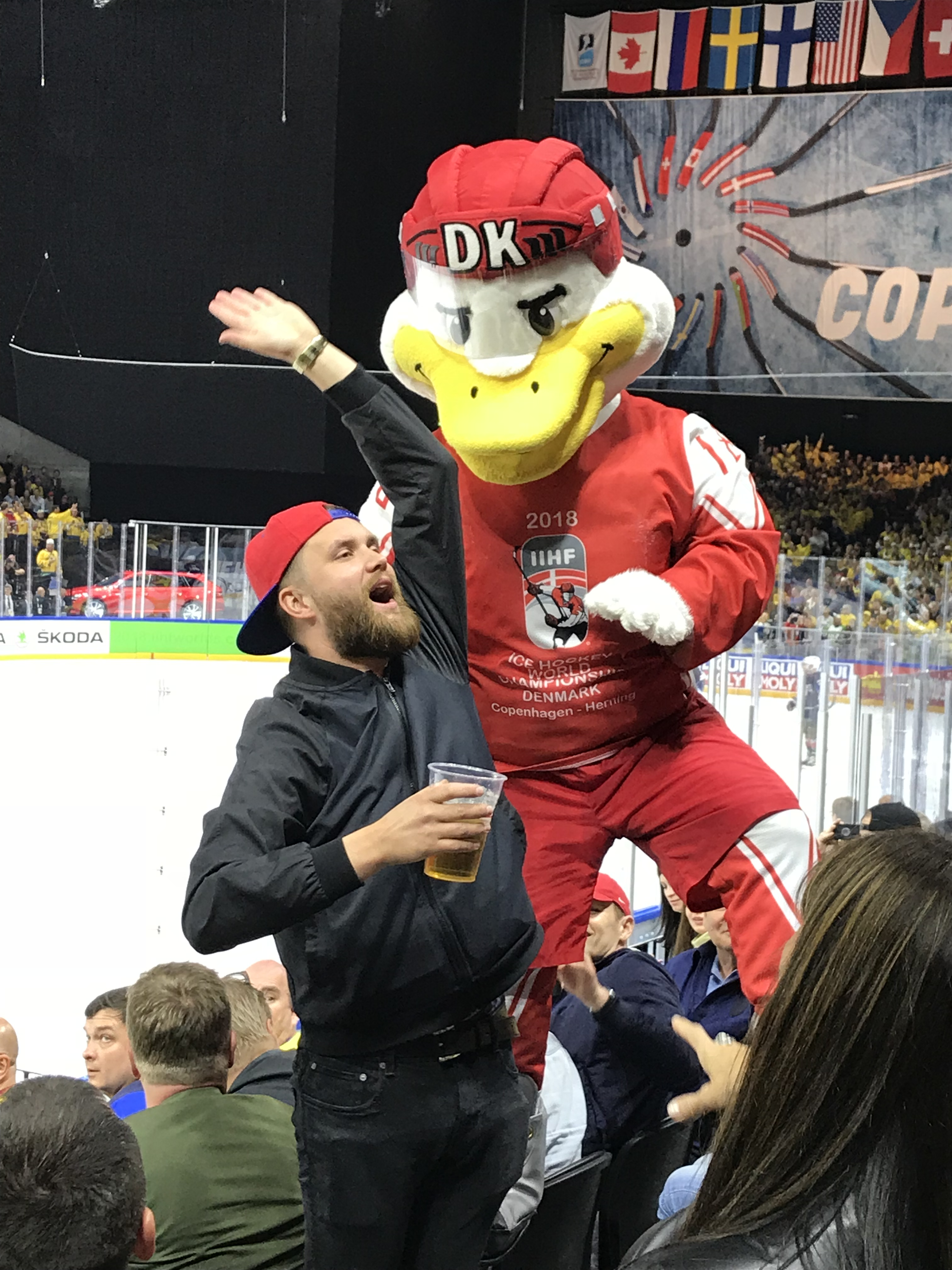
Mascot: Duckly

Qualified as host

- Denmark

Automatic qualifier after a top 14 placement at the 2017 IIHF World Championship

- Belarus
- Canada
- Czech Republic
- Finland
- France
- Germany
- Latvia
- Norway
- Russia
- Slovakia
- Sweden
- Switzerland
- United States

Qualified through winning a promotion at the 2017 IIHF World Championship Division I

- Austria
- South Korea

== Seeding ==
The seeding in the preliminary round was based on the 2017 IIHF World Ranking, which ended at the conclusion of the 2017 IIHF World Championship.

Denmark and Sweden played in separate groups, Denmark at the Jyske Bank Boxen while Sweden at the Royal Arena in Copenhagen.

Group A

- Russia (2)
- Sweden (3)
- Czech Republic (6)
- Switzerland (7)
- Belarus (10)
- Slovakia (11)
- France^{1} (13)
- Austria (16)

Group B

- Canada (1)
- Finland (4)
- United States (5)
- Germany (8)
- Norway (9)
- Latvia (12)
- Denmark^{1} (14)
- South Korea (21)

^{1} Denmark and France swapped sides so Denmark would not be in the same group as Sweden.

== Rosters ==
Each team's roster consisted of at least 15 skaters (forwards, and defencemen) and 2 goaltenders, and at most 22 skaters and 3 goaltenders. All 16 participating nations, through the confirmation of their respective national associations, had to submit a "Long List" no later than two weeks before the tournament, and a final roster by the Passport Control meeting prior to the start of tournament.

== Officials ==
16 referees and linesman were announced on 21 March 2018.

Referees	Linesmen
(Austria) Mark Lemelin; (Canada) Oliver Gouin; (Canada) Brett Iverson; (Czech Republic) Jan Hribik; (Czech Republic) Antonín Jeřábek; (Finland) Mikko Kaukokari; (Finland) Aleksi Rantala; (Germany) Gordon Schukies; (Russia) Roman Gofman; (Russia) Konstantin Olenin; (Switzerland) Tobias Wehrli; (Slovakia) Jozef Kubuš; (Sweden) Linus Öhlund; (Sweden) Mikael Sjöqvist; (United States) Timothy Mayer; (United States) Stephen Reneau	(Belarus) Dmitri Golyak; (Canada) Dustin McCrank; (Canada) Nathan Vanoosten; (Czech Republic) Miroslav Lhotský; (Denmark) Rene Jensen; (Finland) Hannu Sormunen; (Finland) Sakari Suominen; (Germany) Lukas Kohlmüller; (Norway) Jon Kilian; (Russia) Alexander Otmakhov; (Russia) Gleb Lazarev; (Switzerland) Nicolas Fluri; (Slovakia) Peter Šefčík; (Sweden) Andreas Malmqvist; (United States) Jake Davis; (United States) Brian Oliver

== Preliminary round ==
The schedule was released on 8 August 2017.

=== Group A ===
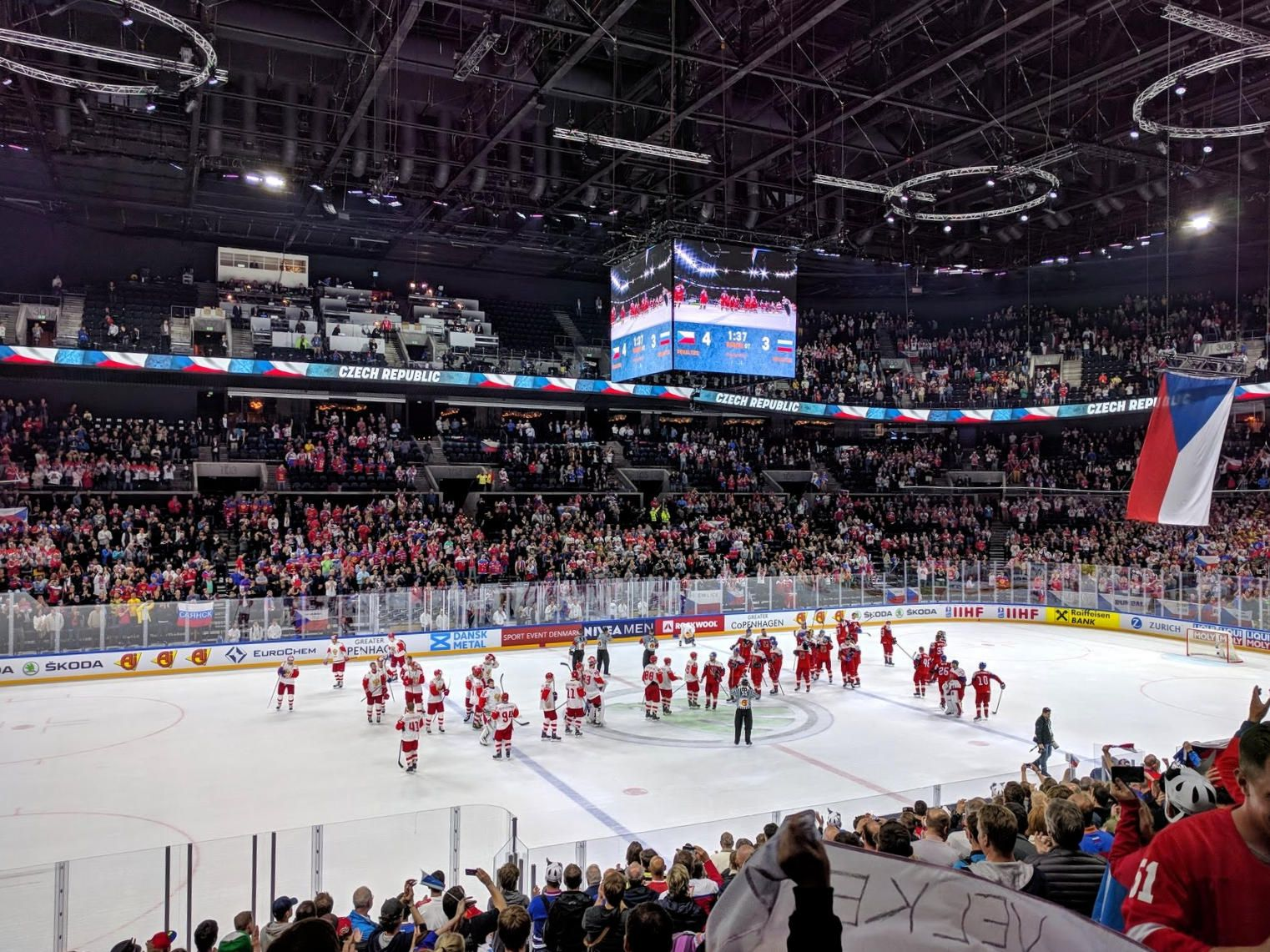
Czech Republic vs Russia at Royal Arena

Pos	Team	Pld	W	OTW	OTL	L	GF	GA	GD	Pts	Qualification or relegation
1	Sweden	7	6	1	0	0	31	9	+22	20	Quarterfinals
2	Russia	7	5	0	1	1	32	10	+22	16	Quarterfinals
3	Czech Republic	7	3	3	0	1	27	15	+12	15	Quarterfinals
4	Switzerland	7	3	1	1	2	25	19	+6	12	Quarterfinals
5	Slovakia	7	3	0	2	2	19	20	−1	11	
6	France	7	2	0	0	5	13	29	−16	6	
7	Austria	7	1	0	1	5	13	30	−17	4	
8	Belarus (R)	7	0	0	0	7	8	36	−28	0	Relegation to 2019 Division I A (Note: The rules state that "the bottom ranked two teams will be relegated" and the 2019 hosts (Slovakia) cannot be relegated by rule.)

Source: IIHF
Rules for classification: 1) points; 2) head-to-head points; 3) head-to-head goal difference; 4) head-to-head number of goals scored; 5) result against closest best-ranked team outside tied teams; 6) result against second-best ranked team outside tied teams; 7) seeding before tournament.
(R) Relegated
Notes:

4 May 2018
Russia	7–0	France
Sweden	5–0	Belarus
5 May 2018
Switzerland	3–2 (OT)	Austria
France	6–2	Belarus
Czech Republic	3–2 (OT)	Slovakia
6 May 2018
Austria	0–7	Russia
Sweden	3–2	Czech Republic
Slovakia	0–2	Switzerland
7 May 2018
Belarus	0–6	Russia
Sweden	4–0	France
8 May 2018
Austria	2–4	Slovakia
Czech Republic	5–4 (GWS)	Switzerland
9 May 2018
Switzerland	5–2	Belarus
Sweden	7–0	Austria
10 May 2018
Slovakia	3–1	France
Czech Republic	4–3 (OT)	Russia
11 May 2018
France	5–2	Austria
Belarus	0–3	Czech Republic
12 May 2018
Slovakia	3–4 (OT)	Sweden
Austria	4–0	Belarus
Russia	4–3	Switzerland
13 May 2018
France	0–6	Czech Republic
Switzerland	3–5	Sweden
14 May 2018
Russia	4–0	Slovakia
Czech Republic	4–3	Austria
15 May 2018
Switzerland	5–1	France
Belarus	4–7	Slovakia
Russia	1–3	Sweden

=== Group B ===
Pos	Team	Pld	W	OTW	OTL	L	GF	GA	GD	Pts	Qualification or relegation
1	Finland	7	5	0	1	1	38	11	+27	16 (Note: Finland 6–2 United States)	Quarterfinals
2	United States	7	4	2	0	1	39	16	+23	16	Quarterfinals
3	Canada	7	4	1	1	1	32	12	+20	15	Quarterfinals
4	Latvia	7	3	1	2	1	16	16	0	13	Quarterfinals
5	Denmark (H)	7	3	1	0	3	13	17	−4	11	
6	Germany	7	1	1	2	3	16	20	−4	7	
7	Norway	7	1	1	1	4	13	31	−18	6	
8	South Korea (R)	7	0	0	0	7	4	48	−44	0	Relegation to 2019 Division I A

Source: IIHF
Rules for classification: 1) points; 2) head-to-head points; 3) head-to-head goal difference; 4) head-to-head number of goals scored; 5) result against closest best-ranked team outside tied teams; 6) result against second-best ranked team outside tied teams; 7) seeding before tournament.
(H) Host; (R) Relegated
Notes:

4 May 2018
United States	5–4 (GWS)	Canada
Germany	2–3 (GWS)	Denmark
5 May 2018
Norway	2–3 (OT)	Latvia
Finland	8–1	South Korea
Denmark	0–4	United States
6 May 2018
South Korea	0–10	Canada
Germany	4–5 (GWS)	Norway
Latvia	1–8	Finland
7 May 2018
United States	3–0	Germany
Canada	7–1	Denmark
8 May 2018
South Korea	0–5	Latvia
Finland	7–0	Norway
9 May 2018
Germany	6–1	South Korea
Finland	2–3	Denmark
10 May 2018
United States	3–2 (OT)	Latvia
Norway	0–5	Canada
11 May 2018
Denmark	3–0	Norway
United States	13–1	South Korea
12 May 2018
Latvia	3–1	Germany
Denmark	3–1	South Korea
Canada	1–5	Finland
13 May 2018
Norway	3–9	United States
Germany	3–2 (OT)	Finland
14 May 2018
South Korea	0–3	Norway
Canada	2–1 (OT)	Latvia
15 May 2018
Finland	6–2	United States
Canada	3–0	Germany
Latvia	1–0	Denmark

== Playoff round ==
Quarterfinals
17 May
Sweden	3
Latvia	2
17 May
United States	3
Czech Republic	2
17 May
Russia	4
Canada (OT)	5
17 May
Finland	2
Switzerland	3

Semifinals
19 May
Sweden	6
United States	0
19 May
Canada	2
Switzerland	3

Final
20 May
Sweden (GWS)	3
Switzerland	2
Third place
20 May
United States	4
Canada	1

=== Quarterfinals ===
17 May 2018; 16:15	Russia	4–5 OT (0–1, 2–1, 2–2) (OT: 0–1)	Canada	Royal Arena, Copenhagen; Attendance: 9,017

Game reference

Igor Shestyorkin
Goalies
Darcy Kuemper
Referees:
(Austria) Mark Lemelin
(Finland) Aleksi Rantala
Linesmen:
(United States) Brian Oliver
(Finland) Hannu Sormunen

	0–1	04:45 – Parayko (McDavid, Eberle) (PP)
	0–2	31:51 – Nugent-Hopkins (McDavid, Parayko) (PP)
Mikheyev (Anisimov, Zaitsev) – 32:53	1–2
Barabanov (Dadonov) (EA) – 37:32	2–2
	2–3	47:11 – Turris (Schwartz)
Andronov (Zaitsev, Soshnikov) – 48:44	3–3
	3–4	52:36 – Dubois (Jost)
Anisimov (Grigorenko, Zaitsev) – 54:34	4–4
	4–5	64:57 – O'Reilly (McDavid, Ekblad) (PP)

8 min
Penalties
2 min
30
Shots
41

17 May 2018; 16:15	United States	3–2 (2–0, 0–2, 1–0)	Czech Republic	Jyske Bank Boxen, Herning; Attendance: 4,846

Game reference

Keith Kinkaid
Goalies
Pavel Francouz
Referees:
(Finland) Mikko Kaukokari
(Slovakia) Jozef Kubuš
Linesmen:
(Canada) Dustin McCrank
(Finland) Sakari Suominen

Kane (Ryan) – 10:36	1–0
Atkinson (Bonino, Gaudreau) – 12:19	2–0
	2–1	24:56 – Řepík (Faksa, Gudas)
	2–2	30:55 – Nečas (Pastrňák, Hronek) (PP)
Kane (Ryan) – 46:58	3–2

10 min
Penalties
2 min
31
Shots
26

17 May 2018; 20:15	Sweden	3–2 (0–0, 1–1, 2–1)	Latvia	Royal Arena, Copenhagen; Attendance: 12,490

Game reference

Anders Nilsson
Goalies
Elvis Merzļikins
Referees:
(United States) Timothy Mayer
(Russia) Konstantin Olenin
Linesmen:
(Germany) Lukas Kohlmüller
(Russia) Alexander Otmakhov

Forsberg (Kempe, Ekman-Larsson) – 26:36	1–0
	1–1	31:59 – Bļugers (Ri. Bukarts)
Arvidsson (Ekholm) – 41:49	2–1
Ekman-Larsson (Kempe, Rakell) (PP) – 46:27	3–1
	3–2	50:21 – Balcers (Ķēniņš)

10 min
Penalties
2 min
34
Shots
24

17 May 2018; 20:15	Finland	2–3 (1–0, 0–3, 1–0)	Switzerland	Jyske Bank Boxen, Herning; Attendance: 5,634

Game reference

Harri Säteri
Goalies
Leonardo Genoni
Referees:
(Czech Republic) Antonín Jeřábek
(United States) Stephen Reneau
Linesmen:
(Russia) Gleb Lazarev
(Czech Republic) Miroslav Lhotský

Nutivaara (Koivisto, Rantanen) – 07:01	1–0
	1–1	29:13 – Corvi (Fiala, Niederreiter)
	1–2	32:32 – Vermin (Meier)
	1–3	33:08 – Hofmann (Moser, Fora)
Rantanen (Savinainen, Aho) (PP) – 48:20	2–3

0 min
Penalties
8 min
34
Shots
27

=== Semifinals ===
19 May 2018; 15:15	Sweden	6–0 (1–0, 3–0, 2–0)	United States	Royal Arena, Copenhagen; Attendance: 12,490

Game reference

Anders Nilsson
Goalies
Keith Kinkaid
Referees:
(Russia) Roman Gofman
(Canada) Oliver Gouin
Linesmen:
(Canada) Dustin McCrank
(Canada) Nathan Vanoosten

Arvidsson (De la Rose, Forsberg) – 14:43	1–0
Pääjärvi (Backlund) (SH) – 27:09	2–0
Hörnqvist (Backlund, Klingberg) (PP) – 30:05	3–0
Janmark-Nylén (Rakell) – 30:16	4–0
Arvidsson (Zibanejad) (ENG) – 51:07	5–0
Kempe (Backlund) – 57:01	6–0

14 min
Penalties
6 min
20
Shots
41

19 May 2018; 19:15	Canada	2–3 (0–1, 1–1, 1–1)	Switzerland	Royal Arena, Copenhagen; Attendance: 12,166

Game reference

Darcy Kuemper
Goalies
Leonardo Genoni
Referees:
(Finland) Mikko Kaukokari
(Slovakia) Jozef Kubuš
Linesmen:
(Czech Republic) Miroslav Lhotský
(United States) Brian Oliver

	0–1	18:41 – Scherwey (Untersander, Kukan)
Horvat (Dubois, Pageau) – 27:20	1–1
	1–2	29:40 – Hofmann (Fiala, Andrighetto) (PP)
	1–3	44:14 – Haas (Andrighetto, Diaz) (PP)
Parayko (McDavid, Schenn) (EA) – 57:53	2–3

6 min
Penalties
2 min
45
Shots
17

=== Bronze medal game ===
20 May 2018; 15:45	United States	4–1 (0–0, 1–1, 3–0)	Canada	Royal Arena, Copenhagen; Attendance: 12,111

Game reference

Keith Kinkaid
Goalies
Curtis McElhinney
Referees:
(Finland) Mikko Kaukokari
(Slovakia) Jozef Kubuš
Linesmen:
(Czech Republic) Miroslav Lhotský
(Finland) Sakari Suominen

Kreider (Larkin, DeBrincat) (PP) – 26:40	1–0
	1–1	38:06 – Vlasic (Horvat, Turris)
Bonino (Kane) (PP) – 53:21	2–1
Lee (McAvoy) (ENG) – 57:45	3–1
Kreider (ENG) – 58:18	4–1

4 min
Penalties
14 min
37
Shots
25

=== Gold medal game ===
20 May 2018; 20:15 (UTC+2)	Sweden	3–2 GWS (1–1, 1–1, 0–0) (OT: 0–0) (SO: 1–0)	Switzerland	Royal Arena, Copenhagen; Attendance: 12,490

Game reference

Anders Nilsson
Goalies
Leonardo Genoni
Referees:
(Russia) Roman Gofman
(Canada) Oliver Gouin
Linesmen:
(Russia) Gleb Lazarev
(Canada) Nathan Vanoosten

	0–1	16:38 – Niederreiter (Josi, Fiala)
Nyquist (Ekholm) – 17:54	1–1
	1–2	23:13 – Meier (Corvi, Josi) (PP)
Zibanejad (Ekman-Larsson) (PP) – 34:53	2–2

Zibanejad (miss)
Rakell (miss)
Ekman-Larsson
Forsberg
Shootout
Andrighetto
(miss) Fiala
(miss) Corvi
(miss) Haas
(miss) Niederreiter
4 min
Penalties
10 min
38
Shots
27

== Final ranking and statistics ==
=== Final ranking ===
Pos	Grp	Team	Pld	W	OTW	OTL	L	GF	GA	GD	Pts	Final result
1	A	Sweden	10	8	2	0	0	43	13	+30	28	Champions
2	A	Switzerland	10	5	1	2	2	33	26	+7	19	Runners-up
3	B	United States	10	6	2	0	2	46	25	+21	22	Third place
4	B	Canada	10	4	2	1	3	40	23	+17	17	Fourth place
5	B	Finland	8	5	0	1	2	40	14	+26	16	Eliminated in Quarter-finals
6	A	Russia	8	5	0	2	1	36	15	+21	17	Eliminated in Quarter-finals
7	A	Czech Republic	8	3	3	0	2	29	18	+11	15	Eliminated in Quarter-finals
8	B	Latvia	8	3	1	2	2	18	19	−1	13	Eliminated in Quarter-finals
9	A	Slovakia	7	3	0	2	2	19	20	−1	11	Eliminated in Group stage
10	B	Denmark (H)	7	3	1	0	3	13	17	−4	11	Eliminated in Group stage
11	B	Germany	7	1	1	2	3	16	20	−4	7	Eliminated in Group stage
12	A	France	7	2	0	0	5	13	29	−16	6	Eliminated in Group stage
13	B	Norway	7	1	1	1	4	13	31	−18	6	Eliminated in Group stage
14	A	Austria	7	1	0	1	5	13	30	−17	4	Eliminated in Group stage
15	A	Belarus	7	0	0	0	7	8	36	−28	0	2019 IIHF World Championship Division I
16	B	South Korea	7	0	0	0	7	4	48	−44	0	2019 IIHF World Championship Division I

Source: IIHF.com
Rules for classification: 1) position in the group; 2) number of points; 3) goal difference; 4) goals scored; 5) seeding before tournament.
(H) Host

=== Scoring leaders ===
List shows the top skaters sorted by points, then goals.

Player	GP	G	A	Pts	+/−	PIM	POS
(United States) Patrick Kane	10	8	12	20	−2	0	F
(Finland) Sebastian Aho	8	9	9	18	+15	2	F
(Canada) Connor McDavid	10	5	12	17	+6	10	F
(Sweden) Rickard Rakell	10	6	8	14	+7	6	F
(Finland) Teuvo Teräväinen	8	5	9	14	+14	8	F
(United States) Cam Atkinson	10	7	4	11	−3	2	F
(Sweden) Mika Zibanejad	10	6	5	11	+10	0	F
(Finland) Mikko Rantanen	8	5	6	11	+1	6	F
(Sweden) Mattias Janmark	10	4	6	10	+8	8	F
(United States) Chris Kreider	10	4	6	10	+7	2	F

GP = Games played; G = Goals; A = Assists; Pts = Points; +/− = Plus/minus; PIM = Penalties in minutes; POS = Position
Source: IIHF.com

=== Goaltending leaders ===
Only the top five goaltenders, based on save percentage, who have played at least 40% of their team's minutes, are included in this list.

Player	TOI	GA	GAA	SA	Sv%	SO
(Sweden) Anders Nilsson	440:00	8	1.09	174	95.40	3
(Denmark) Frederik Andersen	362:56	10	1.65	178	94.38	1
(Russia) Igor Shestyorkin	204:57	5	1.46	86	94.19	2
(Latvia) Elvis Merzļikins	360:35	9	1.50	151	94.04	2
(Finland) Harri Säteri	298:31	7	1.41	114	93.86	1

TOI = Time on Ice (minutes:seconds); SA = Shots against; GA = Goals against; GAA = Goals against average; Sv% = Save percentage; SO = Shutouts
Source: IIHF.com

=== Awards ===
- Best players selected by the directorate:
  - Best Goaltender: (Denmark) Frederik Andersen
  - Best Defenceman: (Sweden) John Klingberg
  - Best Forward: (Finland) Sebastian Aho

Source: IIHF.com

- Media All-Stars:
  - MVP: (United States) Patrick Kane
  - Goaltender: (Sweden) Anders Nilsson
  - Defencemen: (Sweden) Adam Larsson / (Sweden) Oliver Ekman-Larsson
  - Forwards: (Sweden) Rickard Rakell / (United States) Patrick Kane / (Finland) Sebastian Aho

Source: IIHF.com

== IIHF honors and awards ==
The 2018 IIHF Hall of Fame inductees and award recipients were honored during the World Championship medal ceremonies in Copenhagen.

IIHF Hall of Fame inductees

- Daniel Alfredsson, Sweden
- Rob Blake, Canada
- Chris Chelios, United States
- Philippe Lacarrière, France
- Jere Lehtinen, Finland
- Bob Nadin, Canada

Award recipients

- Kirovs Lipmans of Latvia received the Paul Loicq Award for outstanding contributions to international ice hockey.
- Jesper Damgaard of Denmark received the Torriani Award for a player with an outstanding career from non-top hockey nation.
