= Markus Nutivaara =

Finnish ice hockey player (born 1994)

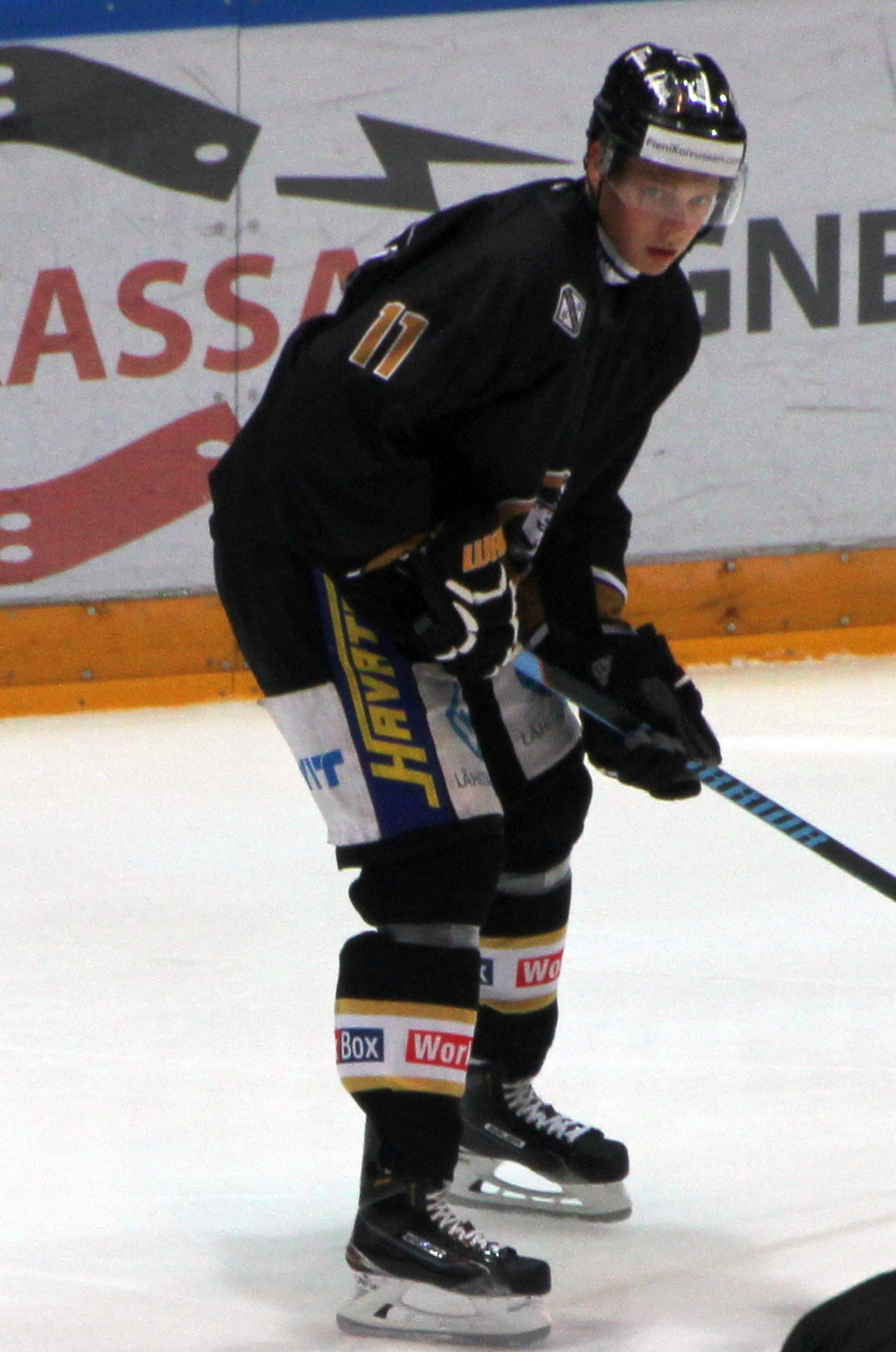
- Nutivaara with Oulun Kärpät in 2014
- Born: 6 June 1994 (age 32) Oulu, Finland
- Height: 6 ft 1 in (185 cm)
- Weight: 187 lb (85 kg; 13 st 5 lb)
- Position: Defence
- Shoots: Left
- DEL team Former teams: Kölner Haie; Oulun Kärpät; Columbus Blue Jackets; Florida Panthers
- National team: Finland
- NHL draft: 189th overall, 2015; Columbus Blue Jackets
- Playing career: 2013–present

Markus Nutivaara (born 6 June 1994) is a Finnish professional ice hockey defenceman, playing for Kölner Haie of the Deutsche Eishockey Liga. Nutivaara was selected by the Columbus Blue Jackets in the 7th round (189th overall) of the 2015 NHL entry draft. He has previously played for the Blue Jackets and Florida Panthers in the NHL and the Oulun Kärpät of the Liiga.

== Playing career ==
Nutivaara made his debut in Finland's top-division, Liiga, playing with Oulun Kärpät during the 2014–15 Liiga season. He helped win the 2015 Liiga title, making 35 appearances in regular season (zero goals, two assists) and 16 in post-season play (one goal, five assists). He also gained international experience competing in the Champions Hockey League with Kärpät, advancing to the semi-finals.

In 2015–16, Nutivaara saw the ice in 50 games during the Liiga regular season, chipping in with six goals, while dishing out 16 assists. He also played in seven playoff contests, recording one goal as well as four assists. In Champions Hockey League play, Nutivaara had 13 appearances, scoring four goals and assisting on five more on the way to the championship game, where Kärpät fell short to Swedish Frölunda HC.

He put pen to paper on a two-year entry-level contract with the Columbus Blue Jackets of the National Hockey League (NHL) in May 2016. During the 2016–17 season, he scored his first NHL goal on 12 November 2016, against the St. Louis Blues to help clinch an 8–4 victory.

On 30 March 2018, Nutivaara was signed to a four-year, $10.8 million contract extension to remain with the Blue Jackets.

On 8 October 2020, Nutivaara ended his tenure with the Blue Jackets after four seasons when he was traded to the Florida Panthers in exchange for Cliff Pu.

After he was limited to just 1 game during 2021–22 season due to injury, Nutivaara left the Panthers as a free agent and was signed to a one-year, $1.75 million contract with the San Jose Sharks on 13 July 2022. Despite this, Nutivaara was unable to appear in any games with the Sharks due to a hip injury, and subsequently retired following the 2022–23 season.

Prior to the 2025–26 season, Nutivaara announced that he would try to make a comeback as a professional player, and on 29 July 2025 Oulun Kärpät announced that Nutivaara had signed a one-year deal with the club.

== International play ==
He made his debut with the Finnish national team at the 2015 Channel One Cup in Prague and Moscow. On 30 April 2018, Nutivaara was selected to participate in his first IIHF sanctioned event for Finland at the 2018 World Championships in Denmark.

== Career statistics ==
=== Regular season and playoffs ===
			Regular season					Playoffs
Season	Team	League	GP	G	A	Pts	PIM	GP	G	A	Pts	PIM
2010–11	Ahmat	FIN.3 U18	13	8	7	15	10	—	—	—	—	—
2010–11	Ahmat	FIN.4	3	0	0	0	2	—	—	—	—	—
2011–12	Kärpät	FIN U18	33	9	16	25	6	6	2	4	6	4
2012–13	Pelicans	FIN U20	42	4	11	15	14	—	—	—	—	—
2013–14	Kärpät	FIN U20	19	2	9	11	10	12	1	4	5	2
2013–14	Jokipojat	Mestis	11	0	3	3	4	—	—	—	—	—
2014–15	Kärpät	FIN U20	7	2	6	8	0	5	3	2	5	0
2014–15	Kärpät	Liiga	35	0	2	2	4	16	1	5	6	0
2014–15	Hokki	Mestis	2	0	2	2	2	—	—	—	—	—
2015–16	Kärpät	Liiga	50	6	16	22	14	7	1	4	5	0
2016–17	Columbus Blue Jackets	NHL	66	2	5	7	6	2	1	1	2	0
2017–18	Columbus Blue Jackets	NHL	61	7	16	23	14	6	0	0	0	0
2017–18	Cleveland Monsters	AHL	3	0	0	0	0	—	—	—	—	—
2018–19	Columbus Blue Jackets	NHL	80	5	16	21	6	2	0	0	0	0
2019–20	Columbus Blue Jackets	NHL	37	3	6	9	4	2	0	0	0	0
2020–21	Florida Panthers	NHL	30	0	10	10	12	5	0	0	0	14
2021–22	Florida Panthers	NHL	1	0	1	1	0	—	—	—	—	—
2025–26	Oulun Kärpät	Liiga	35	7	9	16	8	—	—	—	—	—
Liiga totals			85	6	18	24	18	23	2	9	11	0
NHL totals			275	17	54	71	42	17	1	1	2	14

=== International ===
Year	Team	Event	Result	GP	G	A	Pts	PIM
2018	Finland	WC	5th	8	3	6	9	6
Senior totals				8	3	6	9	6
