= Mikko Rantanen =

Finnish ice hockey player (born 1996)

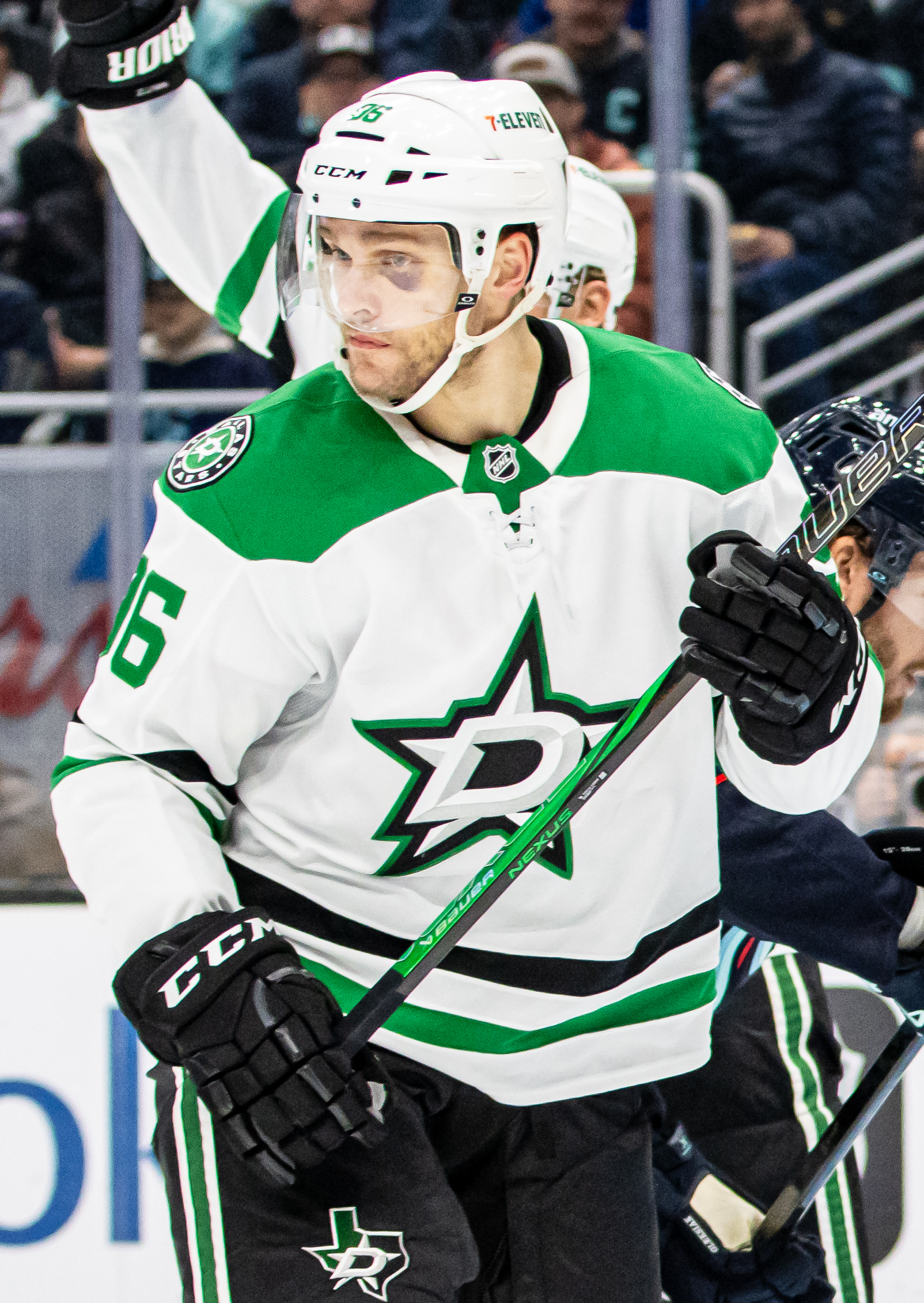
- Rantanen with the Dallas Stars in 2025
- Born: 29 October 1996 (age 29) Nousiainen, Finland
- Height: 6 ft 4 in (193 cm)
- Weight: 228 lb (103 kg; 16 st 4 lb)
- Position: Forward
- Shoots: Left
- NHL team Former teams: Dallas Stars; TPS; Colorado Avalanche; Carolina Hurricanes
- National team: Finland
- NHL draft: 10th overall, 2015; Colorado Avalanche
- Playing career: 2012–present

Mikko Rantanen (born 29 October 1996) is a Finnish professional ice hockey player who is a forward for the Dallas Stars of the National Hockey League (NHL). He was selected in the first round, 10th overall, by the Colorado Avalanche in the 2015 NHL entry draft and made his NHL debut that year. Rantanen, nicknamed "The Moose" for his size and powerful style of play, won the Stanley Cup with the Avalanche in 2022. Following a brief mid-season stint with the Carolina Hurricanes in 2025, Rantanen signed an eight-year deal with Dallas.

== Playing career ==
=== Early career ===
Rantanen made his professional Finnish SM-liiga debut as a 16-year-old playing with HC TPS during the 2012–13 season. Rantanen had played with TPS from a youth of 14-years old at the under-16 level. In 15 games he recorded three points (two goals and one assist).

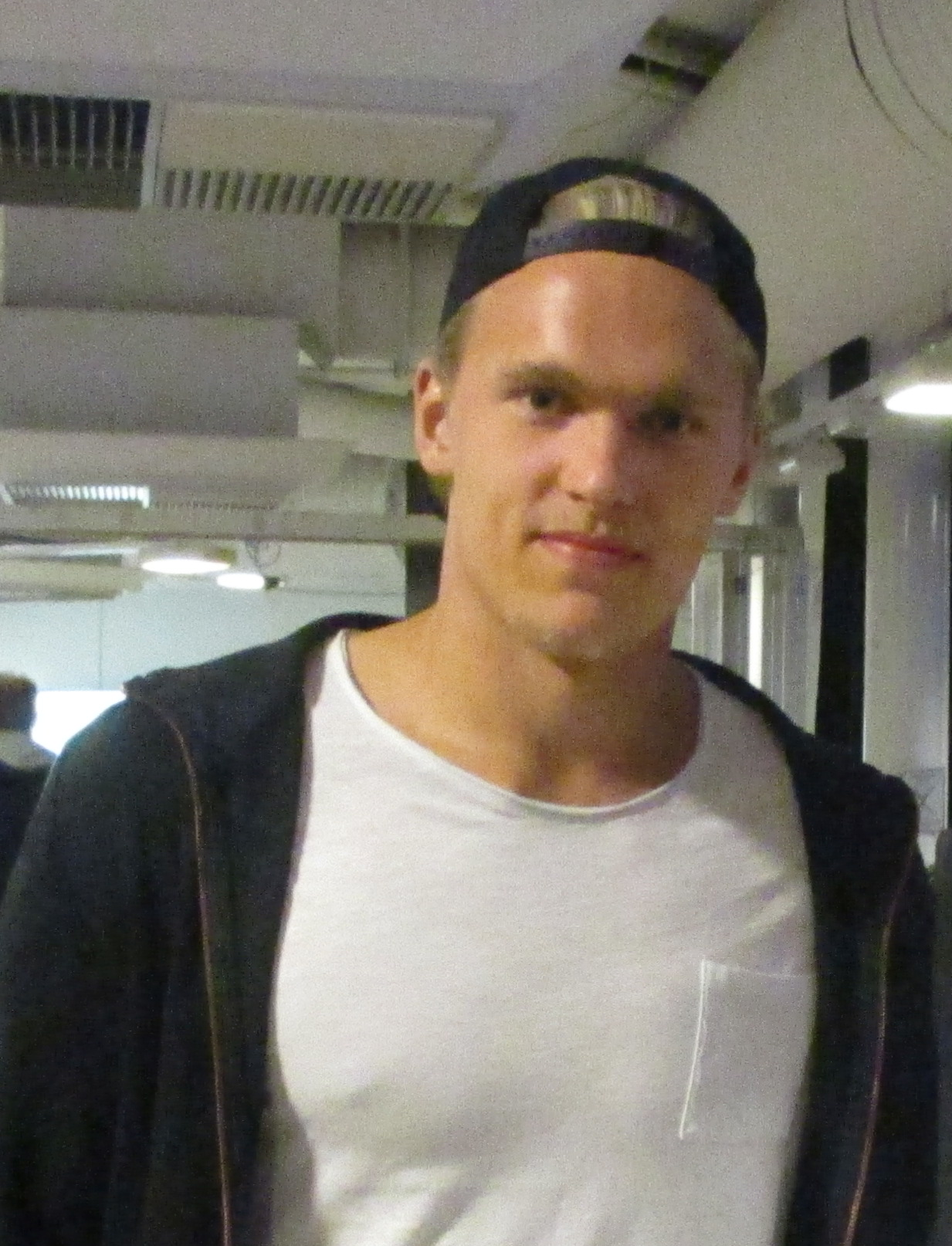
Rantanen in 2016

Entering the 2014–15 season as the only 17-year-old to play in his third year with TPS, Rantanen signed a two-year extension to remain with the Liiga outfit on 9 October 2014. Through using his big frame and physical play, Rantanen recorded a career-high nine goals and 28 points in 56 games, also serving as an alternate captain. He also featured for TPS junior club in the postseason recording 14 points in 7 contests to help capture the championship and was given Best Player honours for his efforts.

In his National Hockey League (NHL) draft-eligible year, Rantanen was rated as the top European skater at season's end. He was taken 10th overall by the Colorado Avalanche at the 2015 NHL entry draft on 26 June 2015.

=== Colorado Avalanche (2015–2025) ===
On 13 July 2015, Rantanen signed a three-year, entry-level contract with the Avalanche. After attending his first Avalanche training camp, and impressing in the preseason, Rantanen was announced to have made the opening night roster for the 2015–16 season as an 18-year-old on 6 October 2015. On 8 October 2015, he made his NHL debut to open the season with the Avalanche in a 5–4 defeat to the Minnesota Wild. He was used in a depth role and played limited minutes over six scoreless games with Colorado before being sent to the team's American Hockey League (AHL) affiliate, the San Antonio Rampage, on 22 October 2015.

In his AHL debut, Rantanen contributed with his first goal and assist in North America during a 5–1 victory over the Stockton Heat on 24 October 2015. He continued his scoring pace with the Rampage, leading the club in all offensive categories before he was selected to the AHL All-Star Game as the second-youngest participant in the event's modern history. After receiving a three-game recall to the Avalanche, Rantanen was returned to complete the season with San Antonio, becoming just the seventh teenager to reach the 60-point mark, doing so in just 52 games. In finishing sixth in overall scoring, he earned a selection to the Second All-Star Team and shared the Dudley "Red" Garrett Memorial Award alongside Frank Vatrano as the AHL's rookie of the year.

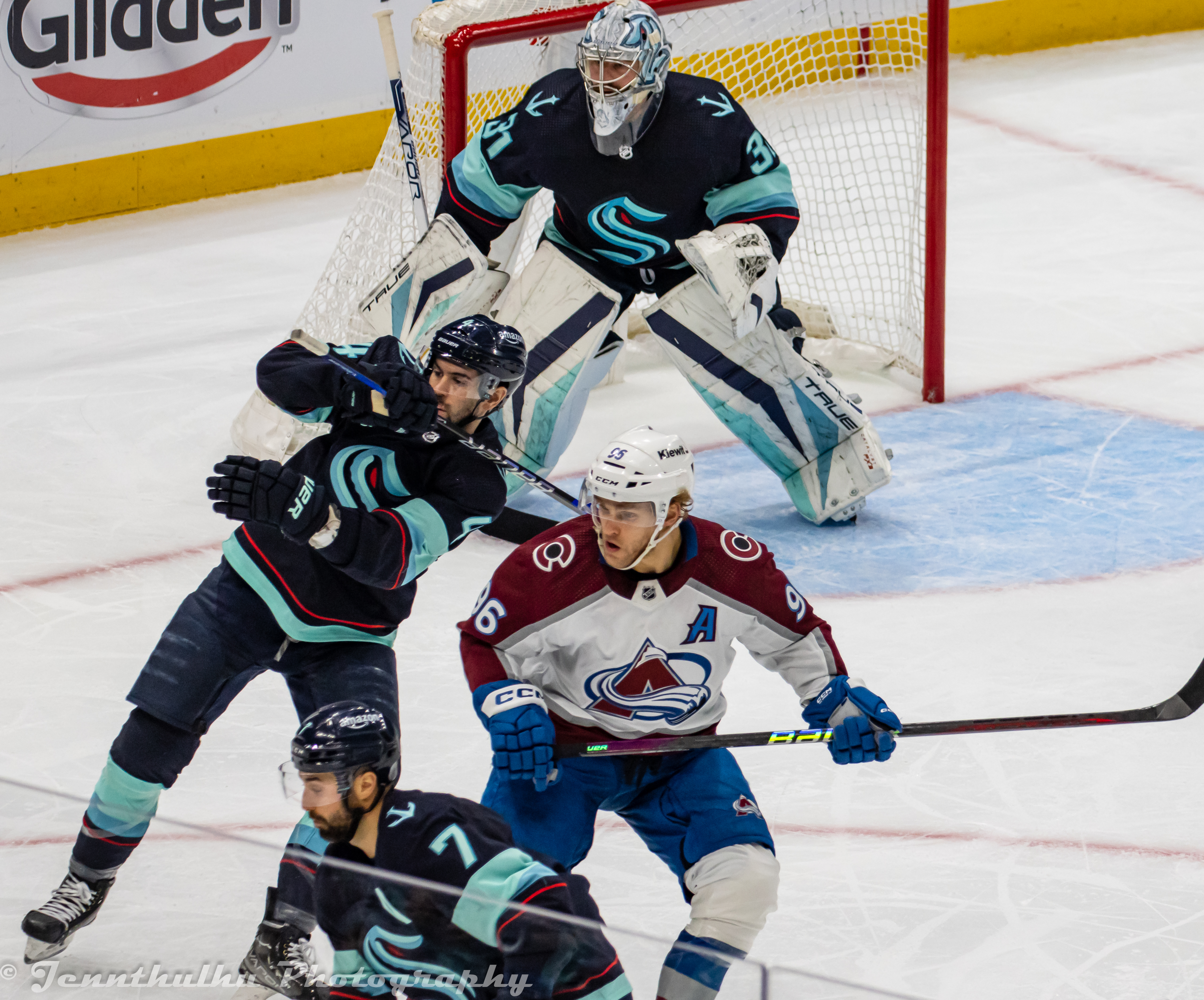
Rantanen battles for position against Justin Schultz during the 2023 Stanley Cup playoffs.

On 11 November 2016, Rantanen scored his first NHL goal 1:03 into the second period in a game against the Winnipeg Jets. The Avalanche would go on to win 3–2 in overtime. He recorded his first NHL hat trick on 8 February 2017 in a 4–0 win over the Montreal Canadiens.

Rantanen had a breakout year during the 2017–18 season, scoring 29 goals and 55 assists for 84 points in 81 games; only linemate Nathan MacKinnon had more points for Colorado. The team qualified for the 2018 Stanley Cup playoffs as the second wild card team in the Western Conference. Rantanen had four assists as the team was eliminated by the Nashville Predators in six games.

The 2018–19 season saw Rantanen continue to play at an impressive pace, highlighted by his play during the first few months of the season. By December 2018, Rantanen had earned 50 points and was on pace to score the most points by any player since the 2004–05 lockout. Although his scoring would drop off, Rantanen finished the season with 87 points in 74 games played; a career-high. He also led the team in scoring during the team's two-round playoff run.

On 28 September 2019, Rantanen signed a six-year, $55.5 million contract extension with the Avalanche.

On 26 June 2022, the Colorado Avalanche won the Stanley Cup by defeating the Tampa Bay Lightning in six games, giving Rantanen his first Stanley Cup championship.

In the 2022–23 season, Rantanen became the third Finn all-time, after Jari Kurri and Teemu Selänne, to score 50 goals in a season, and the third player in Colorado Avalanche history after Joe Sakic and Milan Hejduk. He scored his 500th career point during an April 1 game against the Dallas Stars.

Entering the 2024–25 season and in the final year of his contract before he was set to become an unrestricted free agent, Rantanen and the Avalanche hit an impasse when it came to contract extensions; Rantanen was reportedly seeking an annual salary in the range of $14 million, while the Avalanche were unwilling to offer more than $12.6 million a year (the salary of forward Nathan MacKinnon). The two remained far apart but Rantanen continued to excel on the team, routinely remaining a top 10 scorer in the league as the season progressed.

=== Carolina Hurricanes (2025) ===
On 24 January 2025, Rantanen was traded to the Carolina Hurricanes for Jack Drury, Martin Nečas, a 2025 second-round pick, and a 2026 fourth-round pick in a three-team deal with the Chicago Blackhawks that also saw Taylor Hall being traded to Carolina. Chicago also re-acquired their 2025 third-round pick alongside retaining 50% of Rantanen's contract value against their salary cap. The trade was called a blockbuster by sports analysts, with many commenting that the deal was a shock and the largest in-season trade since Joe Thornton was traded in November 2005 from the Boston Bruins to the San Jose Sharks. The Avalanche and Rantanen's stalemate regarding contract extension was cited as the main driver behind the trade, with commentators noting that the team was seeking to receive assets for a player they were unlikely to re-sign rather than lose Rantanen to another team in free agency without compensation. At the time of the trade, Rantanen led Colorado with 25 goals and was sixth in league-wide scoring with 64 points.

After the trade, the Hurricanes attempted to extend Rantanen, reportedly offering a franchise-record contract worth at least $100 million during the 4 Nations Face-Off season pause. However, with Rantanen remaining noncommittal in the days leading up to the NHL's annual trade deadline, Carolina explored trading Rantanen, rather than risk losing him in unrestricted free agency for no compensation. Trade speculation further intensified after Rantanen's play disappointed in Carolina relative to his superstar expectations, especially compared to Nečas who had played well with the Avalanche. Multiple teams inquired about Rantanen leading up to the 7 March trade deadline, with talks between the Dallas Stars and Hurricanes intensifying just after midnight on the day of the deadline, with any prospective trade contingent on Rantanen signing an extension with Dallas.

=== Dallas Stars (2025–present) ===
On the afternoon of trade deadline day, after 13 games with the Hurricanes, Rantanen was traded in a sign-and-trade deal to Dallas, after which he immediately signed an eight-year, $96 million contract extension with Dallas, with the Stars trading Logan Stankoven, two conditional first-round picks (2026 and 2028; which would defer to the following year if either pick is in the top 10), and two third-round picks (2026 and 2027) to Carolina. The Hurricanes faced criticism after the trade, questioning why the team would trade for a player it was not confident it could sign, or why the team initially traded for an unsigned player if the club was not comfortable with the potential he could leave as a free agent. On 7 May, Rantanen became the third player in NHL history to score a hat trick in two consecutive playoff games, after Doug Bentley in 1944 and Jari Kurri in 1985.

Rantanen was suspended for one game on 23 November 2025. This became the first suspension of his career, following his accumulation of two game misconduct penalties for physical infractions before playing in 41 regular season games. His first game misconduct penalty came during a game against the New York Islanders on 18 November, when he fell into Alexander Romanov on the boards during the last seconds of the third period. Romanov was expected to need between five and six months to recover from shoulder surgery following the hit. Rantanen's second game misconduct penalty came two games later against Matt Coronato who was boarded during the second period of a matchup against the Calgary Flames; Coronato returned to play in the following period after receiving stitches on his nose. Rantanen missed the Stars' next game against the Edmonton Oilers on 25 November, which Dallas won 8–3.

== International play ==
Medal record

Men's ice hockey

Representing Finland

Olympic Games
| Bronze medal – third place | 2026 Milano Cortina | |

World Championships
| Silver medal – second place | 2016 Russia | |

World Junior Championships
| Gold medal – first place | 2016 Finland | |

Rantanen was introduced and developed as a youth in the Finnish national junior under-16 program. He was first selected at an international tournament at the 2013 World U-17 Hockey Challenge, scoring seven points in five contests. He went on to lead the team at the under-18 level with seven points in four games at the 2013 Ivan Hlinka Memorial Tournament before competing in his first full IIHF competition at the 2014 IIHF World U18 Championships.

Rantanen continued his progression within the Finnish junior team in earning selection to the 2015 World Junior Championships in Toronto. Despite a disappointing seventh-place finish, Rantanen contributed with four goals in five games to earn a top-three player on team selection.

During his first North American professional season and while eligible for his final junior tournament, Rantanen was loaned by the Colorado Avalanche to Captain the Finnish junior team as they hosted the 2016 World Junior Championships. While adding a stabilising veteran presence, Rantanen played a supporting role throughout the round-robin stage before stepping up his production in the Semi-final against Sweden and scoring in the Final against Russia to help Finland claim the gold medal and cap his junior career.

He represented Finland at the 2026 Winter Olympics and won a bronze medal.

== Career statistics ==
=== Regular season and playoffs ===
| | | | Regular season | | | | | Playoffs |
| Season | Team | League | GP | G | A | Pts | PIM | GP | G | A | Pts | PIM |
|---|---|---|---|---|---|---|---|---|---|---|---|---|
| 2011–12 | TPS | FIN U18 | 22 | 5 | 8 | 13 | 6 | 7 | 1 | 1 | 2 | 2 |
| 2012–13 | TPS | FIN U18 | 5 | 2 | 6 | 8 | 0 | 1 | 1 | 0 | 1 | 0 |
| 2012–13 | TPS | FIN U20 | 35 | 10 | 14 | 24 | 14 | 9 | 2 | 4 | 6 | 4 |
| 2012–13 | TPS | SM-l | 15 | 2 | 1 | 3 | 4 | — | — | — | — | — |
| 2013–14 | TPS | FIN U18 | 2 | 0 | 2 | 2 | 0 | — | — | — | — | — |
| 2013–14 | TPS | FIN U20 | 17 | 5 | 13 | 18 | 8 | 3 | 2 | 1 | 3 | 0 |
| 2013–14 | TPS | Liiga | 37 | 5 | 4 | 9 | 10 | — | — | — | — | — |
| 2014–15 | TPS | Liiga | 56 | 9 | 19 | 28 | 22 | — | — | — | — | — |
| 2014–15 | TPS | FIN U20 | — | — | — | — | — | 7 | 6 | 8 | 14 | 2 |
| 2015–16 | Colorado Avalanche | NHL | 9 | 0 | 0 | 0 | 2 | — | — | — | — | — |
| 2015–16 | San Antonio Rampage | AHL | 52 | 24 | 36 | 60 | 42 | — | — | — | — | — |
| 2016–17 | San Antonio Rampage | AHL | 4 | 0 | 2 | 2 | 4 | — | — | — | — | — |
| 2016–17 | Colorado Avalanche | NHL | 75 | 20 | 18 | 38 | 22 | — | — | — | — | — |
| 2017–18 | Colorado Avalanche | NHL | 81 | 29 | 55 | 84 | 34 | 6 | 0 | 4 | 4 | 0 |
| 2018–19 | Colorado Avalanche | NHL | 74 | 31 | 56 | 87 | 54 | 12 | 6 | 8 | 14 | 4 |
| 2019–20 | Colorado Avalanche | NHL | 42 | 19 | 22 | 41 | 14 | 15 | 7 | 14 | 21 | 6 |
| 2020–21 | Colorado Avalanche | NHL | 52 | 30 | 36 | 66 | 34 | 10 | 5 | 8 | 13 | 4 |
| 2021–22 | Colorado Avalanche | NHL | 75 | 36 | 56 | 92 | 56 | 20 | 5 | 20 | 25 | 4 |
| 2022–23 | Colorado Avalanche | NHL | 82 | 55 | 50 | 105 | 82 | 7 | 7 | 3 | 10 | 2 |
| 2023–24 | Colorado Avalanche | NHL | 80 | 42 | 62 | 104 | 50 | 11 | 4 | 10 | 14 | 8 |
| 2024–25 | Colorado Avalanche | NHL | 49 | 25 | 39 | 64 | 28 | — | — | — | — | — |
| 2024–25 | Carolina Hurricanes | NHL | 13 | 2 | 4 | 6 | 10 | — | — | — | — | — |
| 2024–25 | Dallas Stars | NHL | 20 | 5 | 13 | 18 | 22 | 18 | 9 | 13 | 22 | 10 |
| 2025–26 | Dallas Stars | NHL | 64 | 22 | 55 | 77 | 93 | 6 | 1 | 6 | 7 | 12 |
| Liiga totals | | | 108 | 16 | 24 | 40 | 36 | — | — | — | — | — |
| NHL totals | | | 716 | 316 | 466 | 782 | 501 | 105 | 44 | 86 | 130 | 50 |

=== International ===
| Year | Team | Event | Result | GP | G | A | Pts | PIM |
|---|---|---|---|---|---|---|---|---|
| 2013 | Finland | U17 | 7th | 5 | 2 | 5 | 7 | 22 |
| 2013 | Finland | IH18 | 5th | 4 | 3 | 4 | 7 | 0 |
| 2014 | Finland | WJC18 | 6th | 5 | 3 | 2 | 5 | 0 |
| 2015 | Finland | WJC | 7th | 5 | 4 | 0 | 4 | 2 |
| 2016 | Finland | WJC | 1st place, gold medalist(s) | 7 | 2 | 3 | 5 | 2 |
| 2016 | Finland | WC | 2nd place, silver medalist(s) | 5 | 0 | 1 | 1 | 2 |
| 2017 | Finland | WC | 4th | 10 | 4 | 6 | 10 | 0 |
| 2018 | Finland | WC | 5th | 8 | 5 | 6 | 11 | 6 |
| 2023 | Finland | WC | 7th | 8 | 0 | 9 | 9 | 4 |
| 2025 | Finland | 4NF | 4th | 3 | 1 | 0 | 1 | 0 |
| 2026 | Finland | OG | 3rd place, bronze medalist(s) | 5 | 2 | 4 | 6 | 2 |
| Junior totals | | | | 26 | 14 | 14 | 28 | 26 |
| Senior totals | | | | 39 | 12 | 26 | 38 | 14 |

== Awards and honours ==
| Award | Year | Ref |
Jr. A
| Champion | 2015 | |
| Ville Peltonen Award | 2015 | |
AHL
| AHL All-Star Game | 2016 | |
| AHL All-Rookie Team | 2016 | |
| Dudley "Red" Garrett Memorial Award | 2016 | |
| AHL Second All-Star Team | 2016 | |
NHL
| NHL All-Star Game | 2019, 2023 | |
| NHL Second All-Star Team | 2021 | |
| Stanley Cup champion | 2022 | |

Awards and achievements
| Preceded by Conner Bleackley | Colorado Avalanche first round draft pick 2015 | Succeeded by Tyson Jost |
| Preceded by Matt Murray | AHL Rookie of the Year; 2015–16; With: Frank Vatrano | Succeeded by Danny O'Regan |
