= Jyske Bank Boxen =

Sports venue in Herning, Denmark

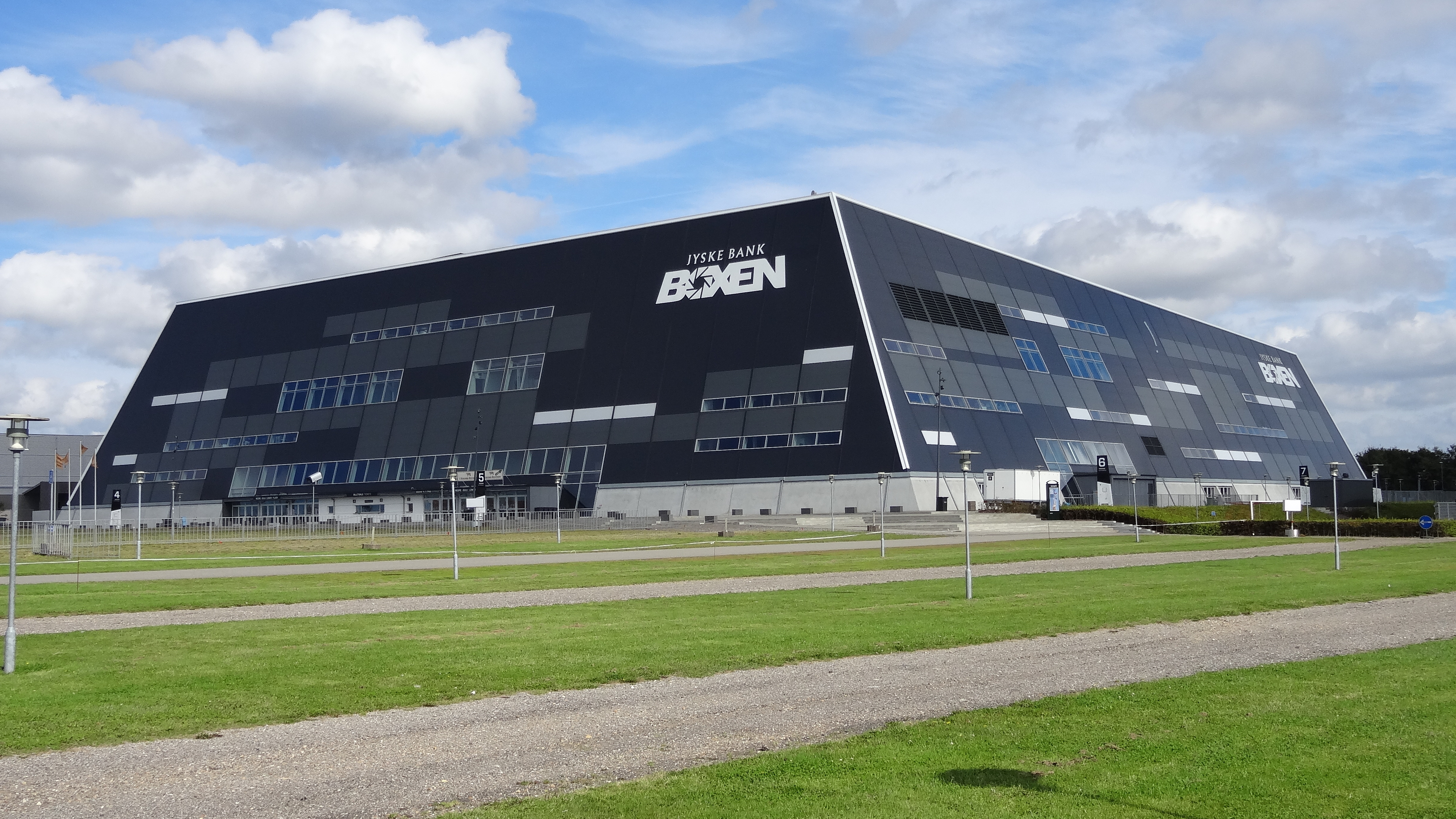
- Interactive map of Jyske Bank Boxen
- Former names: Hedens Colosseum (prior to opening); MCH MultiArena (2010)
- Location: Herning, Denmark
- Coordinates: 56°7′5″N 8°57′9″E
- Owner: MCH Group
- Capacity: 14,500 (Handball); 11,000 (Ice hockey); 15,000 (Concerts); 4,000 (Theatre concerts)

Construction
- Groundbreaking: October 2008
- Opened: 20 October 2010
- Cost: DKK 329 million EUR € 44 million
- Architect: Aarstiderne Arkitekter

Jyske Bank Boxen is an indoor arena, located in Herning, Denmark, that is part of the Messecenter Herning. Opened in October 2010, it has a maximum capacity of 15,000. It hosts concerts, ice hockey, basketball, volleyball, team handball and gymnastics competitions.

It has hosted the 2010 European Women's Handball Championships, the 2013 European Short Course Swimming Championships, the 2014 European Men's Handball Championship, the 2018 IIHF World Championship, the 2019 World Men's Handball Championship, the 2020 European Women's Handball Championship, the 2023 World Women's Handball Championship, the 2025 World Men's Handball Championship and the 2025 World Men's Ice Hockey Championship.

== History ==
On 1 October 2010, Danish financial institution Jyske Bank purchased naming rights to the arena.

The arena's opening event, on 20 October 2010, was a concert by Lady Gaga, during The Monster Ball Tour, with Semi Precious Weapons as her opening act.

The arena was considered to be the venue for the Eurovision Song Contest 2014, other technical issues gave the victory to Copenhagen.

The arena was one of two arenas to host the 2018 IIHF World Championship, the other being the Royal Arena in Copenhagen.

Jyske Bank Boxen plays host to several major TV shows, including the annual Sports Galla and several editions of Dansk Melodi Grand Prix, the Danish national selection for the Eurovision Song Contest.

== Concerts ==
Concerts at Jyske Bank Boxen
Artist	Tour	Date
Lady Gaga	The Monster Ball Tour	20 October 2010
Prince	Prince 20Ten	22 October 2010
Linkin Park	A Thousand Suns Tour	30 October 2010
Kylie Minogue	Aphrodite: Les Folies Tour	19 February 2011
Eric Clapton		11 June 2011
Roger Waters	The Wall Live	13 June 2011
George Michael	Symphonica Tour	29, 31 August & 2 September 2011
Britney Spears	Femme Fatale Tour	10 October 2011
Red Hot Chili Peppers	I'm with You World Tour	14 October 2011
Rihanna	Loud Tour	28 October 2011
Rammstein	Made in Germany 1995-2011	22 February 2012
BSB/New Kids on the Block	NKOTBSB Tour	12 May 2012
One Direction	Take Me Home Tour	5 May 2013
Bruce Springsteen	Wrecking Ball World Tour	16 May 2013
P!nk	The Truth About Love Tour	30 May 2013
Peter Gabriel	Back to Front Tour	28 September 2013
Nephew		5 October 2013
John Mayer	Born and Raised World Tour	15 October 2013
Volbeat	Outlaw Gangsters And Shady Ladies Tour	23 November 2013
Depeche Mode	The Delta Machine Tour	29 November 2013
Robbie Williams	Swings Both Ways Live	10 & 11 May 2014
Lady Gaga	Artrave: The Artpop Ball Tour	27 September 2014
Queen + Adam Lambert	Queen + Adam Lambert Tour 2014–2015	15 February 2015
Katy Perry	The Prismatic World Tour	7 March 2015
Helene Fischer	Farbenspiel Live	30 May 2015
Take That	Live 2015	1 October 2015
Madonna	Rebel Heart Tour	16 November 2015
Adele	Adele Live 2016	4 May 2016
5 Seconds of Summer	Sounds Live Feels Live World Tour	28 May 2016
Iron Maiden	The Book of Souls World Tour	21 June 2016
Paul McCartney	One on One	27 June 2016
Red Hot Chili Peppers	The Getaway World Tour	16 November 2016
John Mayer	The Search for Everything World Tour	5 May 2017
Ariana Grande	Dangerous Woman Tour	12 May 2017
Marcus & Martinus	Together Tour	2 September 2017
Marcus & Martinus	Moments Tour	9 February 2018
Metallica	WorldWired Tour	27 March 2018
Queen + Adam Lambert	Queen + Adam Lambert Tour 2017–2018	15 June 2018
Runrig	The Last Mile	23 June 2018
Roger Waters	Us + Them Tour	7 August 2018
Robbie Williams	XXV Tour	26 February 2023

== See also ==
- List of indoor arenas in Denmark
- List of indoor arenas in Nordic countries

Events and tenants
Preceded by Boris Trajkovski Arena; Skopje	European Women's Handball Championship; Final Venue; 2010	Succeeded by Belgrade Arena; Belgrade
Preceded by L'Odyssee; Chartres	European Swimming Championships (SC); Venue; 2013	Succeeded by Wingate Institute; Netanya
Preceded by Belgrade Arena; Belgrade	European Men's Handball Championship; Final Venue; 2014	Succeeded by Kraków Arena; Kraków
Preceded by Belgrade Arena; Belgrade	World Women's Handball Championship; Final Venue; 2015	Succeeded by TBD
