= Miika Koivisto =

Finnish ice hockey player (born 1990)

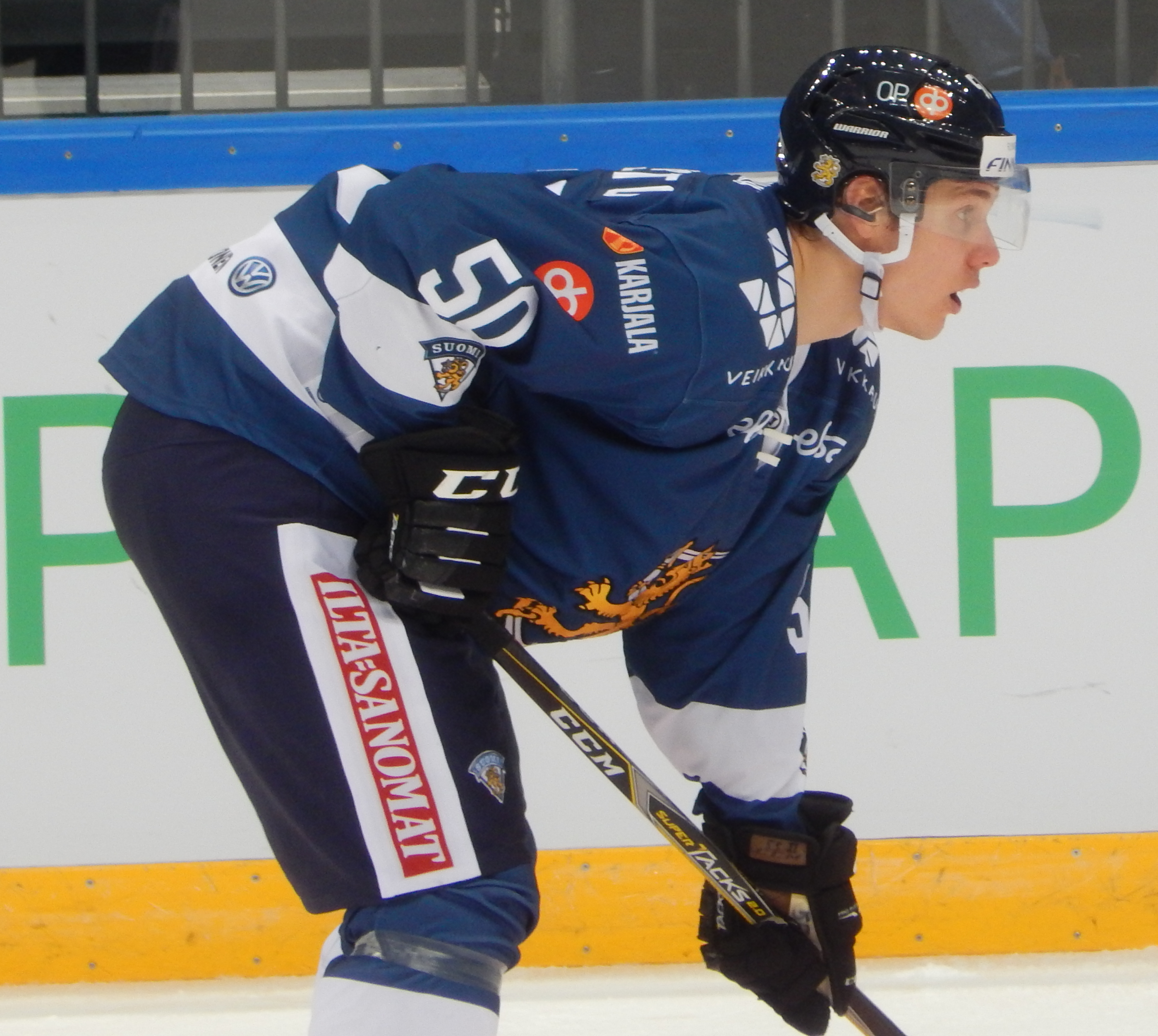
- Born: 20 July 1990 (age 35) Vaasa, Finland
- Height: 6 ft 0 in (183 cm)
- Weight: 194 lb (88 kg; 13 st 12 lb)
- Position: Defence
- Shoots: Left
- SHL team Former teams: Växjö Lakers; KalPa; Lukko; Jukurit; Oulun Kärpät; Dynamo Moscow; SC Bern
- National team: Finland
- Playing career: 2012–present

Miika Koivisto (born 20 July 1990) is a Finnish professional ice hockey defenceman who is currently playing for the Växjö Lakers of the Swedish Hockey League SHL), where he has won 2 SHL championships in 2021 and 2023.

== Playing career ==
Koivisto made his professional debut in the Finnish SM-liiga, playing with KalPa during the 2012–13 SM-liiga season.

After six seasons in the Liiga, Koivisto attracted interest abroad and agreed to a one-year contract as a free agent with Russian outfit, HC Dynamo Moscow of the Kontinental Hockey League (KHL), on May 4, 2018.

Koivisto played a lone season with Dynamo before moving to the Swiss National League (NL), agreeing to a one-year contract SC Bern on 11 June 2019. On November 3, 2019, SC Bern released Koivisto who put up only 2 assists and struggled defensively in 15 games with the team. He was signed the following day to commence a two-year deal with Swedish outfit, Växjö Lakers of the SHL.

== Career statistics ==
=== Regular season and playoffs ===
| | | | Regular season | | | | | Playoffs |
| Season | Team | League | GP | G | A | Pts | PIM | GP | G | A | Pts | PIM |
|---|---|---|---|---|---|---|---|---|---|---|---|---|
| 2006–07 | Sport | FIN U18 | 35 | 0 | 9 | 9 | 32 | — | — | — | — | — |
| 2007–08 | Sport | FIN.2 U18 | 20 | 1 | 19 | 20 | 18 | — | — | — | — | — |
| 2007–08 | Sport | FIN.2 U20 | 4 | 0 | 0 | 0 | 4 | 3 | 0 | 0 | 0 | 2 |
| 2008–09 | Sport | FIN.2 U20 Q | 14 | 1 | 3 | 4 | 6 | — | — | — | — | — |
| 2008–09 | Sport | FIN.2 U20 | 22 | 3 | 3 | 6 | 16 | 8 | 0 | 2 | 2 | 2 |
| 2009–10 | Sport | FIN U20 | 41 | 2 | 14 | 16 | 44 | — | — | — | — | — |
| 2010–11 | Sport | FIN U20 | 38 | 5 | 18 | 23 | 38 | — | — | — | — | — |
| 2010–11 | Sport | Mestis | 5 | 1 | 0 | 1 | 0 | 2 | 0 | 1 | 1 | 0 |
| 2011–12 | Sport | Mestis | 45 | 6 | 11 | 17 | 12 | 11 | 1 | 4 | 5 | 2 |
| 2012–13 | KalPa | SM-l | 57 | 6 | 11 | 17 | 32 | 5 | 0 | 0 | 0 | 2 |
| 2013–14 | KalPa | Liiga | 60 | 2 | 13 | 15 | 36 | — | — | — | — | — |
| 2014–15 | KalPa | Liiga | 49 | 0 | 18 | 18 | 24 | 6 | 1 | 2 | 3 | 0 |
| 2015–16 | Lukko | Liiga | 24 | 1 | 8 | 9 | 12 | — | — | — | — | — |
| 2015–16 | KeuPa HT | Mestis | 1 | 1 | 0 | 1 | 0 | — | — | — | — | — |
| 2016–17 | Jukurit | Liiga | 56 | 4 | 33 | 37 | 24 | — | — | — | — | — |
| 2017–18 | Kärpät | Liiga | 55 | 10 | 29 | 39 | 22 | 15 | 3 | 5 | 8 | 6 |
| 2018–19 | Dynamo Moscow | KHL | 48 | 3 | 15 | 18 | 22 | 6 | 1 | 1 | 2 | 0 |
| 2019–20 | SC Bern | NL | 15 | 0 | 2 | 2 | 2 | — | — | — | — | — |
| 2019–20 | Växjö Lakers | SHL | 36 | 3 | 13 | 16 | 18 | — | — | — | — | — |
| 2020–21 | Växjö Lakers | SHL | 32 | 0 | 12 | 12 | 2 | 14 | 2 | 4 | 6 | 2 |
| 2021–22 | Växjö Lakers | SHL | 27 | 1 | 7 | 8 | 12 | — | — | — | — | — |
| Liiga totals | | | 301 | 23 | 112 | 135 | 150 | 26 | 4 | 7 | 11 | 8 |

Medal record

Representing Finland

Ice hockey

World Championships
| Gold medal – first place | 2019 Slovakia | |
| Silver medal – second place | 2021 Latvia | |

=== International ===
| Year | Team | Event | Result | GP | G | A | Pts | PIM |
|---|---|---|---|---|---|---|---|---|
| 2018 | Finland | OG | 6th | 5 | 0 | 1 | 1 | 2 |
| 2018 | Finland | WC | 5th | 8 | 0 | 3 | 3 | 4 |
| 2019 | Finland | WC | 1st place, gold medalist(s) | 10 | 0 | 2 | 2 | 2 |
| 2021 | Finland | WC | 2nd place, silver medalist(s) | 9 | 0 | 2 | 2 | 2 |
| 2023 | Finland | WC | 7th | 8 | 0 | 2 | 2 | 0 |
| Senior totals | | | | 40 | 0 | 10 | 10 | 10 |

== Awards and honours ==
| Award | Year |
|---|---|
SHL
| Le Mat Trophy (Växjö Lakers) | 2021, 2023 |
