= Rihards Bukarts =

Latvian ice hockey player (born 1995)

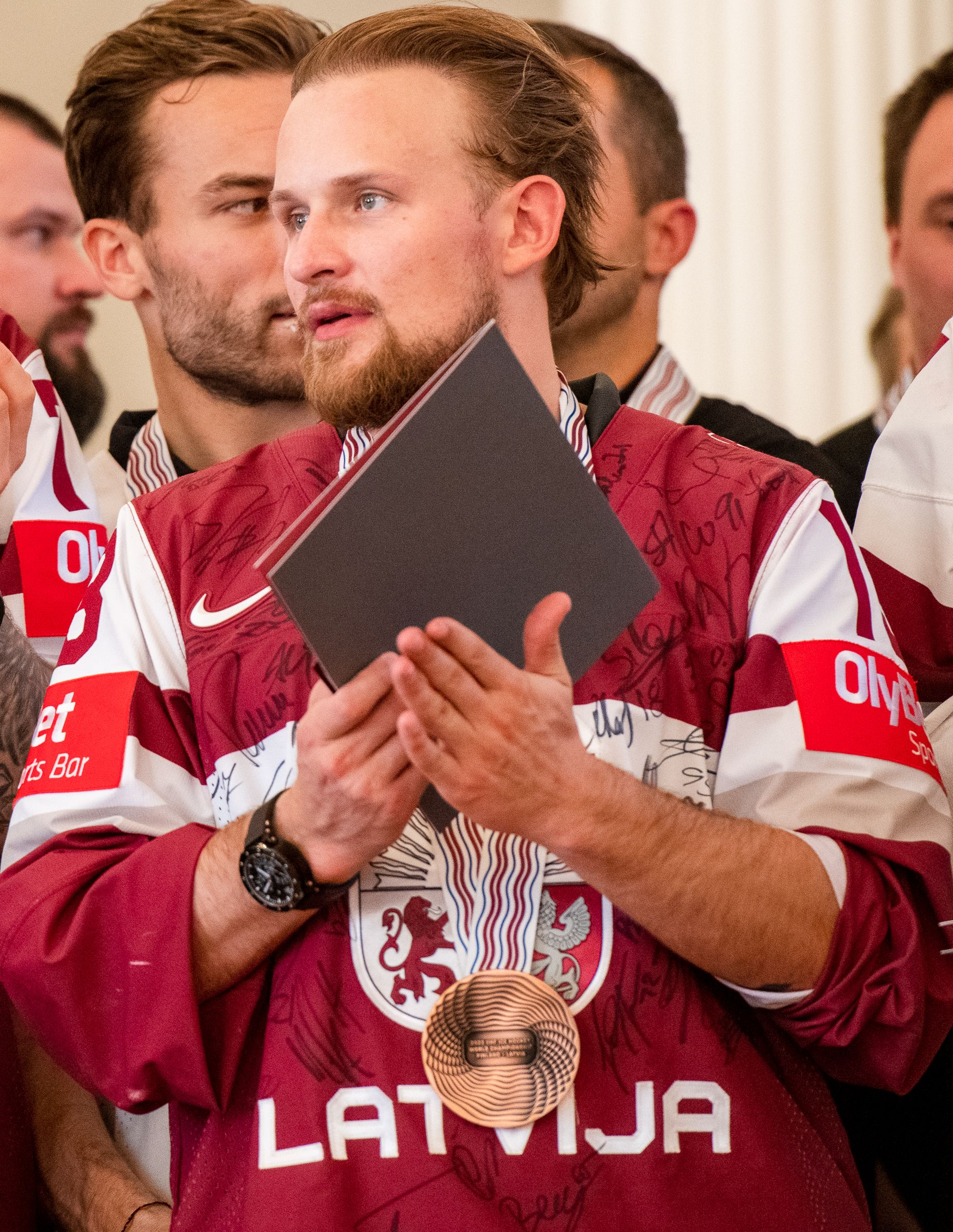
- Rihards Bukarts, 2023
- Born: 31 December 1995 (age 30) Jūrmala, Latvia
- Height: 5 ft 11 in (180 cm)
- Weight: 190 lb (86 kg; 13 st 8 lb)
- Position: Forward
- Shoots: Right
- Slovak team Former teams: HC 21 Prešov; Portland Pirates; Springfield Thunderbirds; HC Zlín; Dinamo Riga; Eisbären Berlin; Schwenninger Wild Wings; Düsseldorfer EG; Admiral Vladivostok; EC KAC; EHC Biel-Bienne; HC Vítkovice
- National team: Latvia
- NHL draft: Undrafted
- Playing career: 2009–present

Rihards Bukarts (born 31 December 1995) is a Latvian professional ice hockey player who is a forward for HC 21 Prešov of the Slovak Extraliga. Bukarts was selected ninth overall in the 2012 KHL Junior Draft by Dinamo Riga. With the selection, Bukarts became the highest-drafted Latvian in KHL history, four spots higher than his brother Roberts Bukarts in 2009.

== Playing career ==
Bukarts became the youngest player ever to score in the MHL on 15 September 2011. On 2 July 2012, Bukarts signed with Dinamo Riga of the Kontinential Hockey League (KHL) on a two-way contract. Bukarts was selected 7th overall in the 2013 CHL Import Draft by the Brandon Wheat Kings (WHL).

Bukarts was the highest-drafted player in Wheat Kings' history. In the summer of 2013, Bukarts broke his contract with Dinamo Riga and left for North America to play for the Brandon Wheat Kings of the Western Hockey League (WHL). He officially signed a contract on 19 July 2013 with the major junior team. In his first season in North America in 2013–14, Bukarts scored 28 goals in 65 games, adding 26 assists.

In the following 2014–15 season, he featured in 62 games, scoring 33 goals, while also adding 41 assists. On 8 February 2015, Bukarts was named Denny's WHL Player of the Week. Bukarts helped the Wheat Kings reach the WHL finals, suffering defeat against the Kelowna Rockets. In 16 playoff games, Bukarts scored 4 goals and 18 points.

Undrafted, Bukarts accepted a try-out to attend the Edmonton Oilers' training camp in 2015. After his release from the Oilers, Bukarts returned to the Wheat Kings for the 2015–16 season before he was traded to the Portland Winterhawks on 29 October 2015. On 14 December 2015, Rihards Bukarts was named the WHL Player of the Week for the 2nd time in his career. In 55 games with the Winterhawks, Bukarts amassed 53 points. At the conclusion of his major junior career, Bukarts joined the Portland Pirates of the AHL, an affiliate to the Florida Panthers, on an amateur try-out basis to complete the season. He recorded an assist in a solitary game.

Bukarts attended the Panthers' rookie camp after signing a one-year deal with the Panthers' AHL affiliate, the Springfield Thunderbirds. He attended Florida's main training camp, before he was reassigned to begin the 2016–17 season with the Thunderbirds. He split the season between Springfield and the ECHL with the Manchester Monarchs.

As a free agent in the following off-season, Bukarts returned to Europe, agreeing to an initial one-year contract with HC Zlin of the Czech Extraliga on 21 August 2017. In the 2017–18 season, Bukarts left the Czech Republic after 17 games, making appearances in the Kontinental Hockey League with Dinamo Riga before completing the season with German club, Eisbären Berlin of the Deutsche Eishockey Liga (DEL).

Bukarts opted to continue in the DEL as a free agent, agreeing to a one-year deal with the Schwenninger Wild Wings on 13 July 2018. In the 2018–19 season, Bukarts contributed with 22 points through 42 games, but was unable to help the Wild Wings progress to the post-season. Bukarts left Schwenninger at the conclusion of his contract at the end of the season.

On 13 May 2019, Bukarts secured a one-year contract to continue in the DEL with Düsseldorfer EG.

On 14 November 2020, he re-joined Dinamo Riga of the KHL on a tryout basis. On 9 December 2020, the team signed him to a two-way deal for the rest of the season. He finished the season with 17 points in 33 games.

On 17 August 2021, Bukarts signed a one-year deal with Admiral Vladivostok of the KHL.

On 2 November 2022, he signed a deal for the rest of the season with EC KAC of the ICE Hockey League (ICEHL).

Without a contract to start the season for the third time in four years, Bukarts signed a three-month deal with EHC Biel-Bienne of the National League (NL) on 24 October 2023. Upon the end of the deal, Bukarts signed a contract with HC Vítkovice of the Czech Extraliga.

Bukarts was limited to just 20 games with HC Vítkovice due to two knee surgeries in 2024-25, and left the team at the end of the season.

Bukarts was without a team to begin the 2025-26 season until 25 December 2025, when he signed with HC 21 Prešov of the Slovak Extraliga.

== International play ==
Medal record

Representing Latvia

Ice hockey

World Championships
| Bronze medal – third place | 2023 Finland/Latvia | |

Bukarts participated at the 2012 and 2013 IIHF World U18 Championships and also 2013 IIHF World U20 Championships he was a member of the Latvia men's national junior ice hockey team. He finished with the most penalty minutes in the tournament.

He represented Latvia at the 2023 IIHF World Championship where he recorded three goals and eight assists and won a bronze medal, Latvia's first ever IIHF World Championship medal.

== Career statistics ==
=== Regular season and playoffs ===
| | | | Regular season | | | | | Playoffs |
| Season | Team | League | GP | G | A | Pts | PIM | GP | G | A | Pts | PIM |
|---|---|---|---|---|---|---|---|---|---|---|---|---|
| 2008–09 | SK Sāga | LAT.2 | 14 | 9 | 5 | 14 | — | — | — | — | — |
| 2009–10 | SK Rīga 18 | LAT U18 | 9 | 7 | 11 | 18 | 2 | — | — | — | — | — |
| 2010–11 | SK Sāga | LAT.2 | 19 | 19 | 30 | 49 | 10 | — | — | — | — | — |
| 2011–12 | Kapitan Stupino | MHL | 47 | 11 | 11 | 22 | 22 | — | — | — | — | — |
| 2011–12 | SK Sāga | LAT.2 | 11 | 28 | 31 | 59 | 12 | — | — | — | — | — |
| 2012–13 | HK Rīga | MHL | 62 | 18 | 17 | 35 | 44 | 3 | 0 | 0 | 0 | 0 |
| 2012–13 | HK Rīga | LAT | — | — | — | — | — | 2 | 0 | 1 | 1 | 0 |
| 2013–14 | Brandon Wheat Kings | WHL | 65 | 28 | 26 | 54 | 50 | 9 | 0 | 4 | 4 | 0 |
| 2014–15 | Brandon Wheat Kings | WHL | 62 | 33 | 41 | 74 | 21 | 16 | 4 | 14 | 18 | 8 |
| 2015–16 | Brandon Wheat Kings | WHL | 10 | 5 | 4 | 9 | 11 | — | — | — | — | — |
| 2015–16 | Portland Winterhawks | WHL | 55 | 26 | 27 | 53 | 24 | 4 | 2 | 1 | 3 | 6 |
| 2015–16 | Portland Pirates | AHL | 1 | 0 | 1 | 1 | 0 | — | — | — | — | — |
| 2016–17 | Springfield Thunderbirds | AHL | 14 | 0 | 3 | 3 | 4 | — | — | — | — | — |
| 2016–17 | Manchester Monarchs | ECHL | 37 | 16 | 17 | 33 | 26 | — | — | — | — | — |
| 2017–18 | Aukro Berani Zlín | ELH | 17 | 2 | 2 | 4 | 20 | — | — | — | — | — |
| 2017–18 | Dinamo Rīga | KHL | 14 | 1 | 0 | 1 | 0 | — | — | — | — | — |
| 2017–18 | Eisbären Berlin | DEL | 2 | 0 | 1 | 1 | 0 | 16 | 4 | 4 | 8 | 6 |
| 2018–19 | Schwenninger Wild Wings | DEL | 42 | 9 | 13 | 22 | 14 | — | — | — | — | — |
| 2019–20 | Düsseldorfer EG | DEL | 48 | 10 | 9 | 19 | 24 | — | — | — | — | — |
| 2020–21 | Dinamo Rīga | KHL | 33 | 11 | 6 | 17 | 10 | — | — | — | — | — |
| 2021–22 | Admiral Vladivostok | KHL | 25 | 6 | 3 | 9 | 12 | — | — | — | — | — |
| 2022–23 | EC KAC | ICEHL | 28 | 13 | 12 | 25 | 8 | 5 | 1 | 2 | 3 | 0 |
| 2023–24 | EHC Biel-Bienne | NL | 11 | 1 | 1 | 2 | 0 | – | – | – | – | – |
| 2023–24 | HC Vítkovice Ridera | ELH | 18 | 7 | 4 | 11 | 10 | 3 | 1 | 1 | 2 | 0 |
| ELH totals | | | 51 | 11 | 9 | 20 | 38 | 3 | 1 | 1 | 2 | 0 |
| KHL totals | | | 72 | 18 | 9 | 27 | 22 | — | — | — | — | — |
| DEL totals | | | 92 | 19 | 23 | 42 | 38 | 16 | 4 | 4 | 8 | 6 |
| ICEHL totals | | | 28 | 13 | 12 | 25 | 8 | 5 | 1 | 2 | 3 | 0 |
| NL totals | | | 11 | 1 | 1 | 2 | 0 | — | — | — | — | — |

=== International ===
| Year | Team | Event | Result | GP | G | A | Pts | PIM |
| 2012 | Latvia | WJC18 | 9th | 6 | 0 | 5 | 5 | 2 |
| 2013 | Latvia | WJC | 10th | 6 | 0 | 1 | 1 | 4 |
| 2013 | Latvia | WJC18 | 10th | 6 | 1 | 1 | 2 | 0 |
| 2017 | Latvia | WC | 10th | 7 | 0 | 3 | 3 | 2 |
| 2018 | Latvia | WC | 8th | 8 | 1 | 2 | 3 | 4 |
| 2019 | Latvia | WC | 10th | 7 | 0 | 3 | 3 | 4 |
| 2021 | Latvia | WC | 11th | 7 | 1 | 0 | 1 | 0 |
| 2021 | Latvia | OGQ | Q | 3 | 1 | 1 | 2 | 0 |
| 2022 | Latvia | OG | 11th | 4 | 0 | 0 | 0 | 0 |
| 2022 | Latvia | WC | 10th | 7 | 2 | 3 | 5 | 0 |
| 2023 | Latvia | WC | 3rd place, bronze medalist(s) | 10 | 3 | 8 | 11 | 8 |
| 2024 | Latvia | WC | 9th | 7 | 1 | 1 | 2 | 4 |
| 2024 | Latvia | OGQ | Q | 3 | 1 | 1 | 2 | 0 |
| 2025 | Latvia | WC | 9th | 7 | 1 | 0 | 1 | 2 |
| 2026 | Latvia | OG | 10th | 4 | 0 | 0 | 0 | 0 |
| Junior totals | | | | 18 | 1 | 7 | 8 | 6 |
| Senior totals | | | | 74 | 11 | 22 | 33 | 24 |
