= Darcy Kuemper =

Canadian ice hockey player (born 1990)

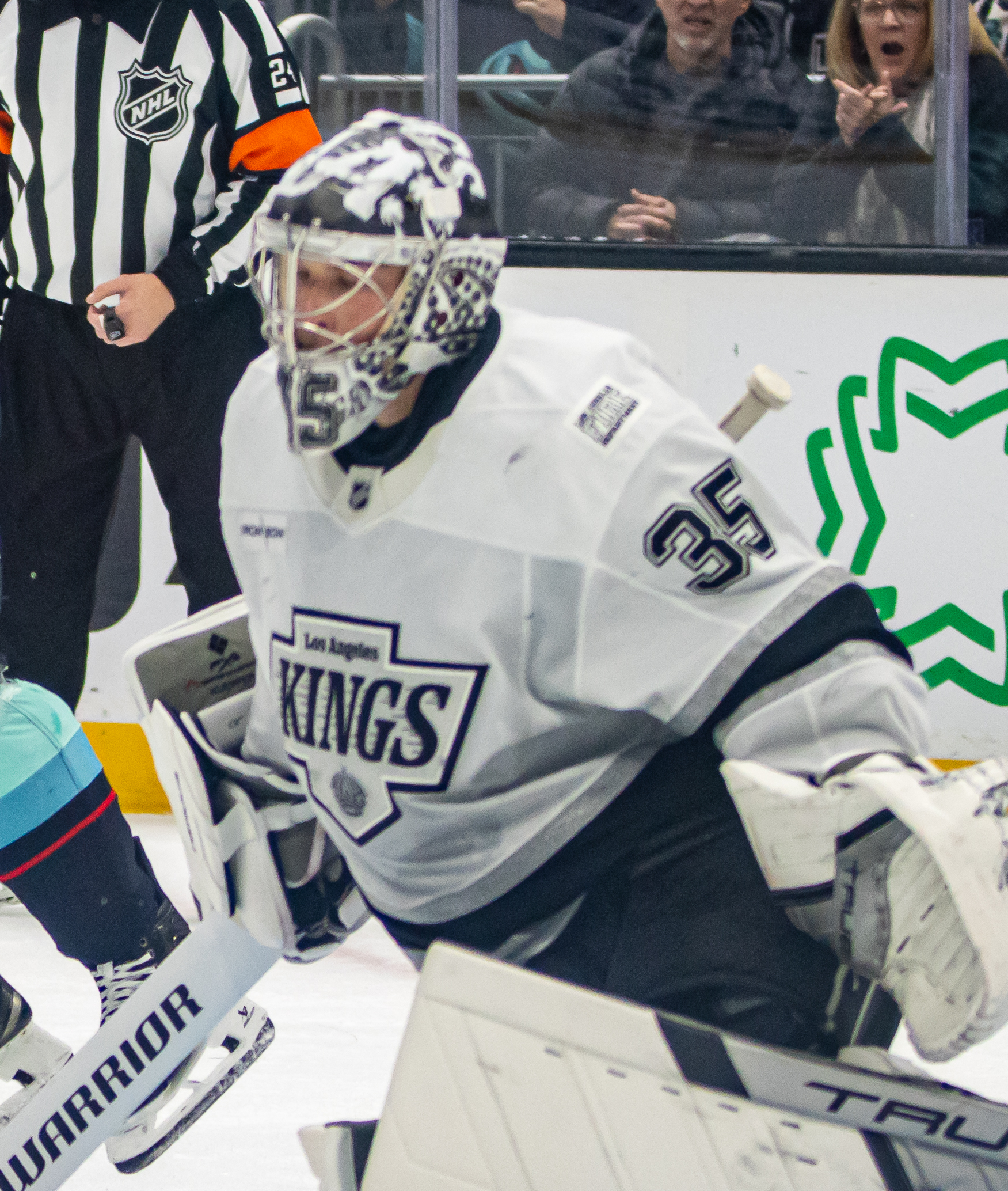
- Kuemper with the Los Angeles Kings in 2025
- Born: May 5, 1990 (age 36) Saskatoon, Saskatchewan, Canada
- Height: 6 ft 5 in (196 cm)
- Weight: 212 lb (96 kg; 15 st 2 lb)
- Position: Goaltender
- Catches: Left
- NHL team Former teams: Los Angeles Kings; Minnesota Wild; Arizona Coyotes; Colorado Avalanche; Washington Capitals
- National team: Canada
- NHL draft: 161st overall, 2009; Minnesota Wild
- Playing career: 2010–present

Darcy Kuemper (born May 5, 1990) is a Canadian professional ice hockey player who is a goaltender for the Los Angeles Kings of the National Hockey League (NHL). He was selected by the Minnesota Wild in the sixth round, 161st overall, of the 2009 NHL entry draft, and has also played in the NHL with the Arizona Coyotes, Colorado Avalanche, and Washington Capitals. Kuemper won the Stanley Cup with the Avalanche in 2022.

Competing internationally for Canada national team, he won a gold medal at the 2021 World Championship and a silver medal at the 2026 Winter Olympics.

== Early life ==
Kuemper was born on May 5, 1990, in Saskatoon, Saskatchewan, to police officer Brent and accountant Sharon Kuemper. Saskatoon is home to a large ice hockey community, and Kuemper began ice skating by the age of three. In his early youth hockey leagues, players would take various turns at goaltender, and Kuemper always enjoyed his turn. At the age of 10, he decided to become a full-time goaltender. His enjoyment of the position came from the fact that, while other skaters came on and off the ice in shifts, the goaltender was constantly involved in play. As a child, Kuemper often played minor ice hockey alongside fellow Saskatoon natives Luke and Brayden Schenn.

Kuemper's goaltending abilities first attracted attention when he played for the Saskatoon Contacts and Blazers in the Saskatchewan Male U18 AAA Hockey League (SMAAAHL) as an adolescent. During the 2005–06 SMAAAHL season, Kuemper, who split time in net for the Contacts with Carl Jahrus, had a 16-3 record and was third in the league with 2.32 goals against average (GAA). Kuemper and the Blazers came within one game of winning the SMAAAHL championship in 2008, but lost to the Notre Dame Hounds in five games.

== Playing career ==
=== Junior ===
The Spokane Chiefs of the Western Hockey League (WHL) selected Kuemper 45th overall in the 2005 WHL Bantam Draft. With most of his time under contract spent playing in Saskatoon as a WHL prospect, however, Kuemper only had 19 seconds of goal time with Spokane, when he relieved starting goaltender Dustin Tokarski at the end of a period during the 2007 WHL playoffs. On December 13, 2007, Spokane traded Kuemper, who at that point was still playing with the Blazers, to the Red Deer Rebels in exchange for a conditional selection in the 2009 WHL Bantam Draft.

Kuemper started playing in the WHL during the 2008–09 season, backing up Morgan Clark on the Rebels. Halfway through the season, however, he had taken over as the everyday goaltender for Red Deer.

Kuemper played three seasons with the Red Deer Rebels, winning the Del Wilson Trophy in the 2010–11 season as the WHL's top goaltender, as well as the CHL Goaltender of the Year with 45 wins, a goals against average (GAA) of 1.86 and a save percentage of .933.

=== Professional ===
==== Minnesota Wild (2012–2017) ====
On May 26, 2011, Kuemper signed a three-year, entry-level contract with the Minnesota Wild. On October 13, 2011, he was loaned to the Ontario Reign of the ECHL. Kuemper was later recalled by the Wild on November 12, 2011.

Kuemper was recalled by the Wild on February 12, 2013. After then-backup goaltender Josh Harding had been ill due to complications from multiple sclerosis treatment, the Wild recalled Kuemper to start the same night to relieve Harding and the team's starting goaltender, Niklas Bäckström. Five days later, on February 17, Kuemper made 29 saves on 31 shots to earn his first career NHL win against the Detroit Red Wings.

On May 1, 2013, Kuemper was again recalled by the Wild to back up Josh Harding, who was starting as a result of an injury to Niklas Bäckström. On May 7, Kuemper made his Stanley Cup playoffs debut when he replaced Harding, who had suffered a left leg injury in the first period of a game against the Chicago Blackhawks.

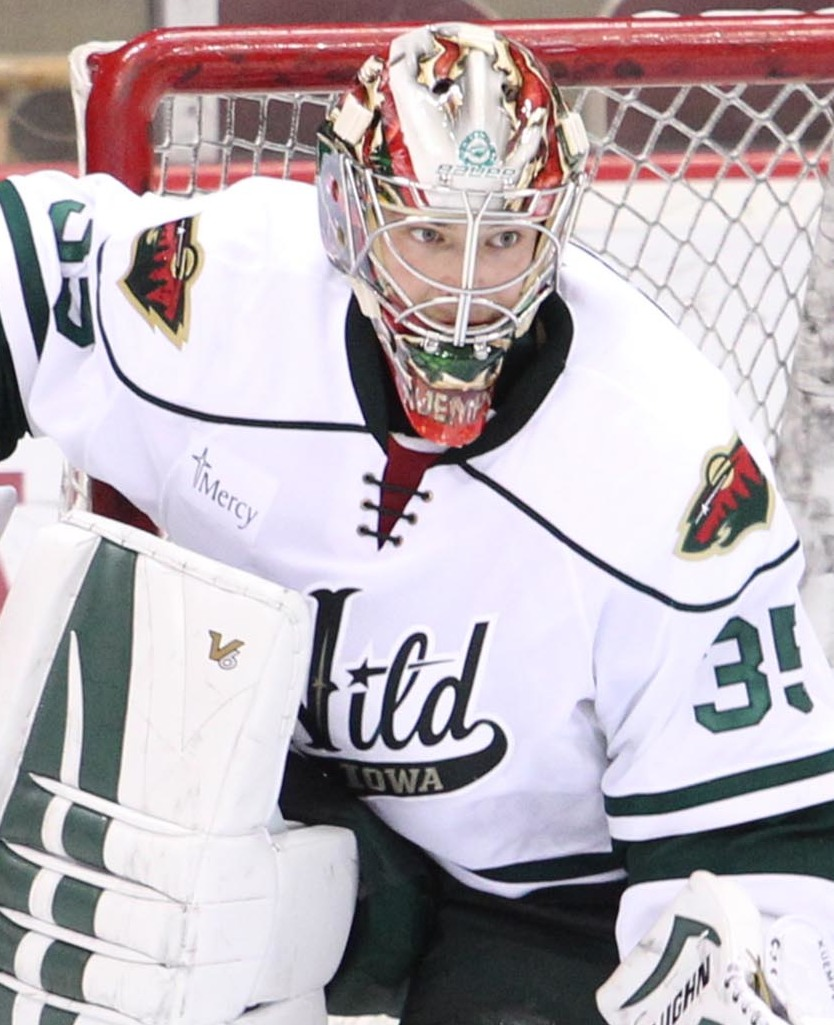
Kuemper with the Iowa Wild in 2015

In the next season's playoffs, in 2014, Kuemper started in game three of the Wild's Western Conference first round matchup against the Colorado Avalanche, replacing Ilya Bryzgalov. Kuemper recorded a shutout in the game, and continued to start for the Wild until sustaining an injury in the third period of game seven of the same series. Bryzgalov replaced Kuemper again and was credited with the win upon Minnesota's overtime victory. The following season, Kuemper opened as Minnesota's starter with Bryzgalov departed and Harding unable to play. However, Kuemper struggled, and Minnesota traded for Devan Dubnyk, who immediately became the starting goaltender. Kuemper and Niklas Bäckström finished the season splitting time as Dubnyk's backup.

==== Los Angeles Kings (2017–2018) ====
On July 1, 2017, Kuemper agreed to a one-year, $650,000 contract with the Los Angeles Kings. In the 2017–18 season, Kuemper excelled in the backup role with the Kings, recording 10 wins in 19 appearances.

==== Arizona Coyotes (2018–2021) ====
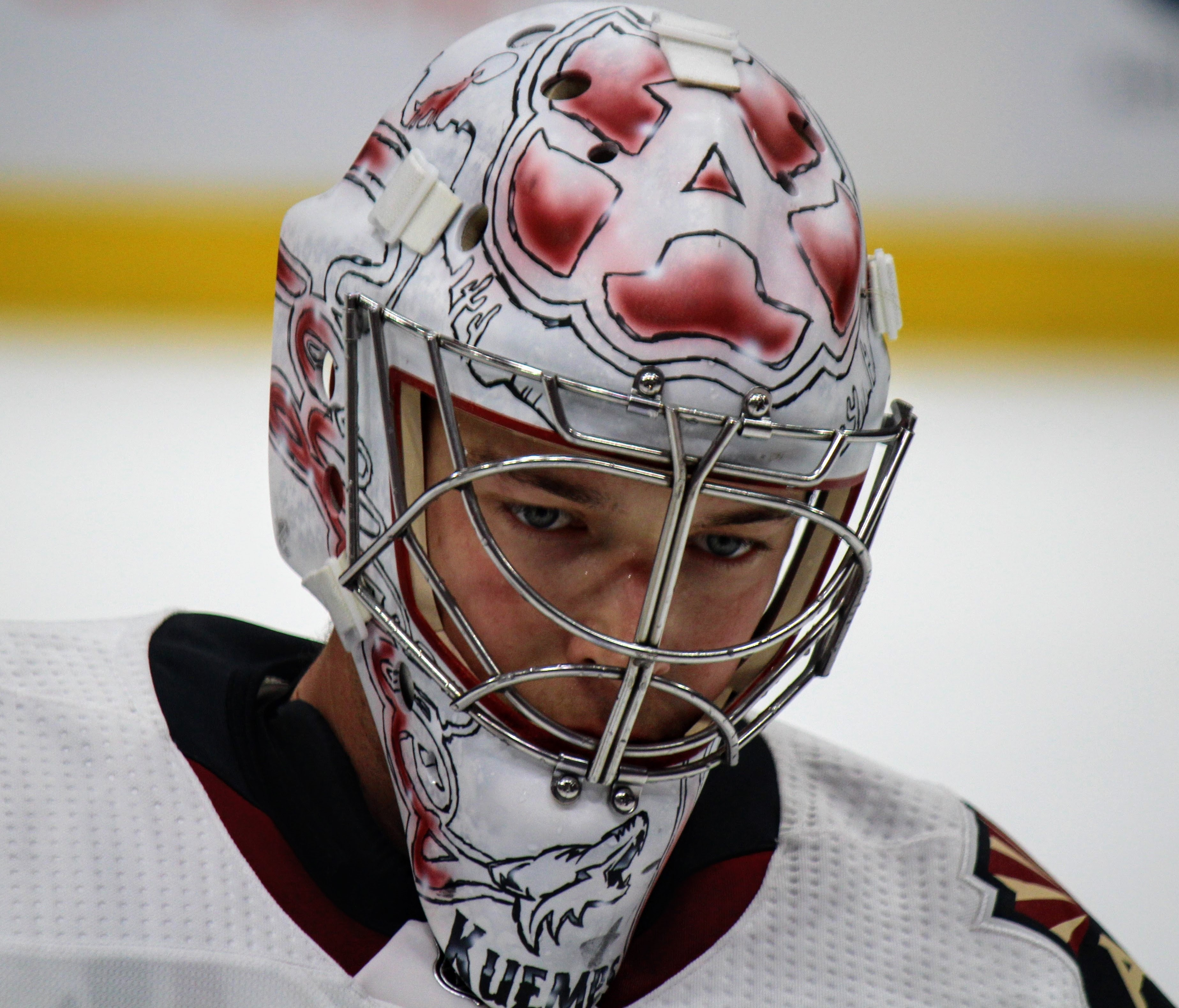
Kuemper with the Coyotes in 2019

On February 21, 2018, Kuemper was traded to the Arizona Coyotes for goaltender Scott Wedgewood and forward Tobias Rieder. Kuemper was immediately re-signed to a two-year, $3.7 million extension by the Coyotes.

With Antti Raanta injured for most of the 2018–19 season, Kuemper appeared in a career-high 55 games and posted a 27–20–8 record. He finished fifth in voting for the Vezina Trophy, awarded to the NHL's best goaltender.

On October 2, 2019, the Coyotes signed Kuemper to a two-year, $9 million extension, ahead of the 2019–20 season. He appeared in 29 games with a 16–11–2 record and .928 save percentage before the regular season was prematurely concluded due to the onset of the COVID-19 pandemic. When the 2020 Stanley Cup playoffs were belatedly held in the summer in a bubble in Canada, Kuemper was widely considered the decisive factor in the Coyotes' victory over the Nashville Predators in the qualifying round. He recorded a .933 save percentage across four games where the Predators outshot the Coyotes in each. The Coyotes advanced to face the Colorado Avalanche in the first round, losing in five games. Kuemper recorded a .895 save percentage in the series, but was generally assessed as having performed well in a situation where his team was overmatched, and notably made 49 saves to secure the team's lone win in game three.

In the shortened 2020–21 season that would prove to be his final one with the Coyotes, Kuemper played only 27 of 56 games due to an MCL injury. He had only a .907 save percentage, which The Athletic called "serviceable" given the team's poor defence.

==== Colorado Avalanche (2021–2022) ====
On July 28, 2021, Kuemper was traded to the Colorado Avalanche in exchange for a 2022 first-round pick, a conditional 2024 third-round pick, and defenceman Conor Timmins. He was acquired to replace the team's former starter Philipp Grubauer, who chose to depart in free agency to the Seattle Kraken. While the team performed well from the beginning of the season, Kuemper was considered somewhat shaky, and after an early injury caused him to miss time it raised questions about the stability of the Avalanche's goaltending. However, by the midpoint of the season he was considered to have improved markedly. Kuemper finished with 37 wins (a career high), an overall record of 37–12–4, five shutouts, and a .921 save percentage in the regular season, all of which ranked in the top 5 for NHL goaltenders for the season. The Avalanche finished second overall in the NHL in points and drew the Nashville Predators in the first round of the 2022 Stanley Cup playoffs.

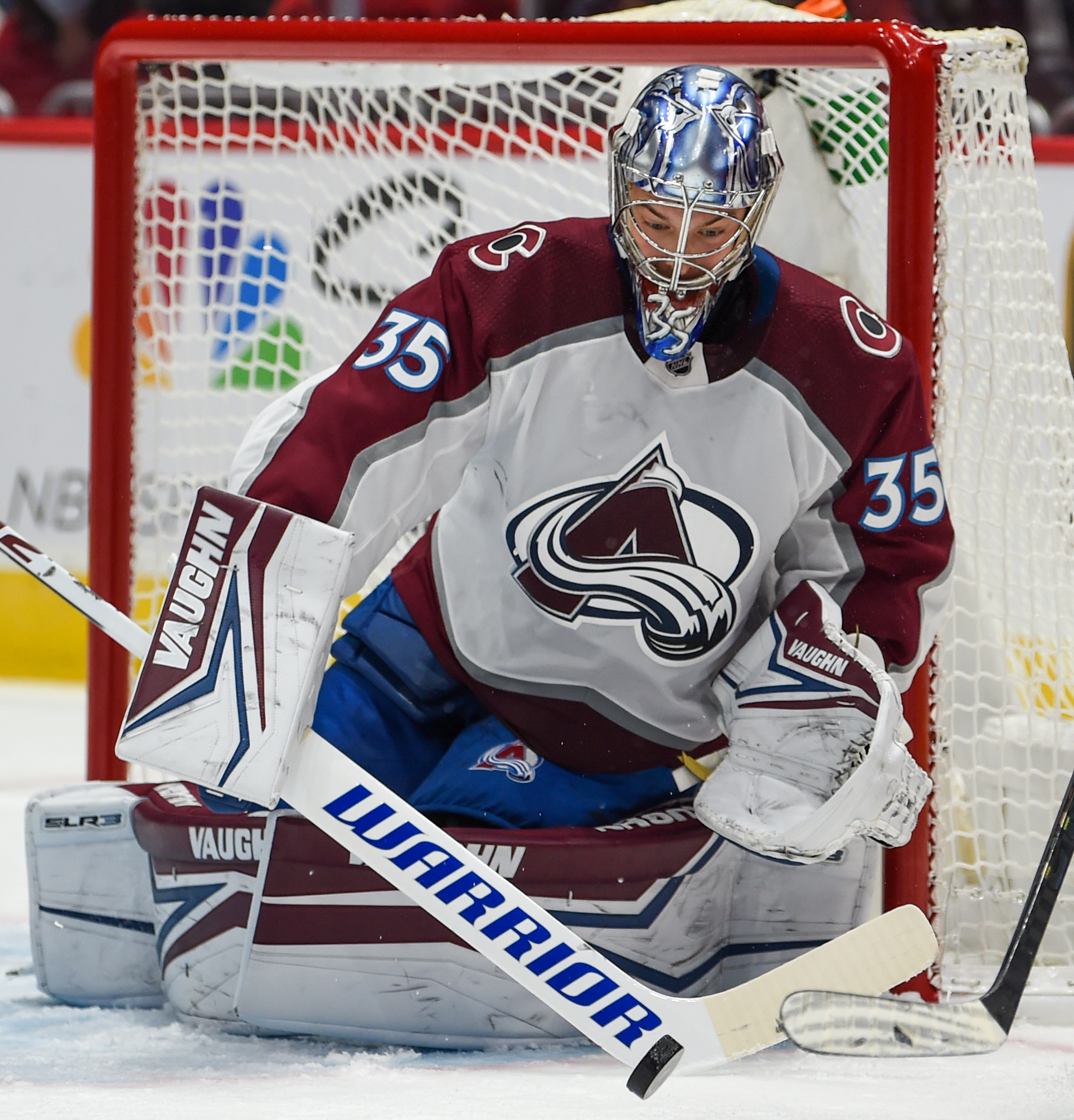
Kuemper with the Avalanche in 2021

Kuemper won his first two games in the first round against the Predators, but was forced to exit midway through game three after Predators forward Ryan Johansen's stick accidentally slipped through his mask and poked him in the eye. He missed the fourth and final game of the series that completed the Avalanche's sweep of the Predators, but the injury proved to be minor. He returned to the ice for the second round series and led the Avalanche past the St. Louis Blues in six games for their first appearance in the conference finals in 21 years. However, he was forced to again exit during game one of the conference finals series against the Edmonton Oilers. It was announced that he would not play in game two, citing an unspecified upper body injury, with backup goaltender Pavel Francouz taking over again. Kuemper returned to the roster for game four as a backup to Francouz, where the Avalanche completed their sweep of the Oilers and advanced to the 2022 Stanley Cup Final. He resumed the role of starter for game one of the Cup Final against the Tampa Bay Lightning. Kuemper made big saves in game four and helped set up Nazem Kadri's overtime-winning goal. In a series-deciding game six, Kuemper outdueled Lightning goaltender Andrei Vasilevskiy one final time and stopped 22 of 23 shots as the Avalanche won their third Stanley Cup title in franchise history. In doing so, Kuemper joined Hall of Fame netminder Patrick Roy as the only other Avalanche goaltender to start, play in, and win a Stanley Cup Final series.

==== Washington Capitals (2022–2024) ====
On July 13, 2022, Kuemper was signed as a free agent to a five-year, $26.25 million contract with the Washington Capitals.

On October 29, 2022, Kuemper recorded his first shutout with the Capitals in a 3–0 win against the Nashville Predators.

==== Return to Los Angeles (2024–present) ====
Following his second season in Washington, Kuemper was traded back to the Los Angeles Kings on June 19, 2024, in exchange for Pierre-Luc Dubois. In the 2024–25 season, he appeared in 50 games, recording a 31–11–7 record and finishing second in the league in goals against average (2.02) and third in save percentage (.922). The Kings allowed the second-fewest goals of any team, and Kuemper was for the first time named a finalist for the Vezina Trophy.

== International play ==
Medal record

Representing Canada

Men's ice hockey

Olympic Games
Silver medal – second place	2026 Milano Cortina	

World Championships
Gold medal – first place	2021 Latvia	

On April 12, 2018, Kuemper was named to Canada national team to compete at the 2018 World Championship. He played seven games with a .867 save percentage, while Canada finished fourth. Kuemper later joined Canada for the 2021 World Championship. He recorded a .916 save percentage in eight games, helping Canada win the gold medal.

On December 31, 2025, he was named to Team Canada's roster to compete at the 2026 Winter Olympics in Milan, Italy.

== Career statistics ==
=== Regular season and playoffs ===
			Regular season									Playoffs
Season	Team	League	GP	W	L	T/OT	MIN	GA	SO	GAA	SV%	GP	W	L	MIN	GA	SO	GAA	SV%
2006–07	Spokane Chiefs	WHL	—	—	—	—	—	—	—	—	—	1	0	0	0	0	0	0.00	.000
2008–09	Red Deer Rebels	WHL	55	21	25	8	3167	156	3	2.96	.898	—	—	—	—	—	—	—	—
2009–10	Red Deer Rebels	WHL	61	28	23	4	3234	147	3	2.73	.908	2	0	2	61	6	0	5.86	.806
2009–10	Houston Aeros	AHL	4	2	1	0	199	8	0	2.41	.886	—	—	—	—	—	—	—	—
2010–11	Red Deer Rebels	WHL	62	45	12	5	3685	114	13	1.86	.933	7	4	3	403	19	0	2.83	.896
2011–12	Ontario Reign	ECHL	8	7	1	0	484	14	0	1.74	.941	—	—	—	—	—	—	—	—
2011–12	Houston Aeros	AHL	19	6	6	4	1070	42	1	2.36	.923	—	—	—	—	—	—	—	—
2012–13	Houston Aeros	AHL	21	13	8	0	1210	38	4	1.88	.934	2	1	1	119	3	1	1.51	.957
2012–13	Orlando Solar Bears	ECHL	3	0	2	1	184	8	0	2.61	.929	—	—	—	—	—	—	—	—
2012–13	Minnesota Wild	NHL	6	1	2	0	288	10	0	2.08	.916	2	0	0	73	4	0	3.29	.879
2013–14	Iowa Wild	AHL	17	7	10	0	997	41	1	2.47	.929	—	—	—	—	—	—	—	—
2013–14	Minnesota Wild	NHL	26	12	8	4	1480	60	2	2.43	.915	6	3	1	325	11	1	2.03	.913
2014–15	Minnesota Wild	NHL	31	14	12	2	1569	68	3	2.60	.905	1	0	0	23	0	0	0.00	1.000
2014–15	Iowa Wild	AHL	5	2	3	0	279	15	1	3.22	.891	—	—	—	—	—	—	—	—
2015–16	Minnesota Wild	NHL	21	6	7	5	1064	43	2	2.43	.915	—	—	—	—	—	—	—	—
2016–17	Minnesota Wild	NHL	18	8	5	3	1054	55	0	3.13	.902	—	—	—	—	—	—	—	—
2017–18	Los Angeles Kings	NHL	19	10	1	3	1000	35	3	2.10	.932	—	—	—	—	—	—	—	—
2017–18	Arizona Coyotes	NHL	10	2	6	2	597	32	1	3.22	.899	—	—	—	—	—	—	—	—
2018–19	Arizona Coyotes	NHL	55	27	20	8	3252	126	5	2.33	.925	—	—	—	—	—	—	—	—
2019–20	Arizona Coyotes	NHL	29	16	11	2	1754	65	2	2.22	.928	9	4	5	502	29	0	3.47	.913
2019–20	Tucson Roadrunners	AHL	1	0	1	0	59	2	0	2.05	.929	—	—	—	—	—	—	—	—
2020–21	Arizona Coyotes	NHL	27	10	11	3	1547	66	2	2.56	.907	—	—	—	—	—	—	—	—
2021–22	Colorado Avalanche	NHL	57	37	12	4	3259	138	5	2.54	.921	16	10	4	887	38	1	2.57	.902
2022–23	Washington Capitals	NHL	57	22	26	7	3224	153	5	2.87	.909	—	—	—	—	—	—	—	—
2023–24	Washington Capitals	NHL	33	13	14	3	1867	103	1	3.31	.890	—	—	—	—	—	—	—	—
2024–25	Los Angeles Kings	NHL	50	31	11	7	2974	99	5	2.00	.922	6	2	4	369	23	0	3.74	.889
2025–26	Los Angeles Kings	NHL	50	19	14	15	2888	134	3	2.78	.891	—	—	—	—	—	—	—	—
NHL totals			489	228	160	68	27,811	1,054	39	2.57	.913	40	19	14	2,180	105	2	2.89	.904

=== International ===
Year	Team	Event	Result	GP	W	L	OT	MIN	GA	SO	GAA	SV%
2018	Canada	WC	4th	7	3	2	1	363	15	1	2.48	.867
2021	Canada	WC	1st place, gold medalist(s)	8	5	2	0	470	17	0	2.17	.916
Senior totals				15	8	4	1	833	32	1	2.33	.892

== Awards and honours ==
Award	Year	Ref
WHL
Del Wilson Trophy	2011	
Four Broncos Memorial Trophy	2011	
WHL East First All-Star Team	2011	
CHL Goaltender of the Year	2011	
NHL
NHL All-Star Game	2020	
Stanley Cup champion	2022	

Awards and achievements
Preceded by Martin Jones	Winner of the Del Wilson Trophy; 2010–11	Succeeded by Tyler Bunz
