= 2018 IIHF World Championship Group A =

Group A was one of two groups of the 2018 IIHF World Championship. The four best placed teams advanced to the playoff round, while the last placed team is relegated to Division I in 2019.

== Standings ==
Pos	Team	Pld	W	OTW	OTL	L	GF	GA	GD	Pts	Qualification or relegation
1	Sweden	7	6	1	0	0	31	9	+22	20	Quarterfinals
2	Russia	7	5	0	1	1	32	10	+22	16	Quarterfinals
3	Czech Republic	7	3	3	0	1	27	15	+12	15	Quarterfinals
4	Switzerland	7	3	1	1	2	25	19	+6	12	Quarterfinals
5	Slovakia	7	3	0	2	2	19	20	−1	11	
6	France	7	2	0	0	5	13	29	−16	6	
7	Austria	7	1	0	1	5	13	30	−17	4	
8	Belarus (R)	7	0	0	0	7	8	36	−28	0	Relegation to 2019 Division I A (Note: The rules state that "the bottom ranked two teams will be relegated" and the 2019 hosts (Slovakia) cannot be relegated by rule.)

Source: IIHF
Rules for classification: 1) points; 2) head-to-head points; 3) head-to-head goal difference; 4) head-to-head number of goals scored; 5) result against closest best-ranked team outside tied teams; 6) result against second-best ranked team outside tied teams; 7) seeding before tournament.
(R) Relegated

== Matches ==
All times are local (UTC+2).

=== Russia vs France ===
4 May 2018; 16:15	Russia	7–0 (3–0, 1–0, 3–0)	France	Royal Arena, Copenhagen; Attendance: 6,453

Game reference

Vasily Koshechkin
Goalies
Florian Hardy
Ronan Quemener
Referees:
(Czech Republic) Jan Hribik
(Sweden) Mikael Sjöqvist
Linesmen:
(Slovakia) Peter Šefčík
(Finland) Sakari Suominen

Kaprizov (Dadonov, Zaitsev) – 07:08	1–0
Buchnevich (Grigorenko, Nesterov) (PP) – 08:18	2–0
Dadonov (Kaprizov, Khafizullin) – 10:22	3–0
Kaprizov (Datsyuk, Zaitsev) – 37:59	4–0
Barabanov (Kiselevich, Kablukov) – 42:36	5–0
Shalunov (Datsyuk, Khafizullin) (PP) – 44:50	6–0
Anisimov (Buchnevich) (PP) – 57:13	7–0

6 min
Penalties
8 min
39
Shots
10

=== Sweden vs Belarus ===
4 May 2018; 20:15	Sweden	5–0 (2–0, 2–0, 1–0)	Belarus	Royal Arena, Copenhagen; Attendance: 10,884

Game reference

Magnus Hellberg
Goalies
Ivan Kulbakov
Mikhail Karnaukhov
Referees:
(Finland) Mikko Kaukokari
(Switzerland) Tobias Wehrli
Linesmen:
(Czech Republic) Miroslav Lhotský
(Canada) Dustin McCrank

Andersson (Kempe, Everberg) – 09:17	1–0
Nyquist (Klingberg, Lindholm) – 09:45	2–0
Janmark (Rakell, Zibanejad) – 23:49	3–0
Rakell – 33:45	4–0
Zibanejad (Janmark, Rakell) – 56:11	5–0

8 min
Penalties
4 min
36
Shots
27

=== Switzerland vs Austria ===
5 May 2018; 12:15	Switzerland	3–2 OT (1–0, 1–1, 0–1) (OT: 1–0)	Austria	Royal Arena, Copenhagen; Attendance: 5,019

Game reference

Leonardo Genoni
Goalies
Bernhard Starkbaum
Referees:
(Russia) Konstantin Olenin
(Sweden) Mikael Sjöqvist
Linesmen:
(Belarus) Dmitri Golyak
(Russia) Gleb Lazarev

Niederreiter (Corvi) – 18:28	1–0
Haas (Scherwey, Müller) – 24:14	2–0
	2–1	34:50 – Zwerger (Rauchenwald, Haudum) (PP)
	2–2	46:28 – Ganahl (Schneider)
Corvi (Niederreiter) – 63:18	3–2

29 min
Penalties
6 min
41
Shots
19

=== France vs Belarus ===
5 May 2018; 16:15	France	6–2 (2–1, 1–0, 3–1)	Belarus	Royal Arena, Copenhagen; Attendance: 6,529

Game reference

Florian Hardy
Goalies
Ivan Kulbakov
Mikhail Karnaukhov
Referees:
(Canada) Oliver Gouin
(Austria) Mark Lemelin
Linesmen:
(Switzerland) Nicolas Fluri
(Finland) Sakari Suominen

Fleury (S. Da Costa, Rech) – 03:33	1–0
S. Da Costa (Janil) – 13:33	2–0
	2–1	19:36 – Pavlovich (Razvadovsky, Vorobey) (PP)
Lampérier (Claireaux, Hecquefeuille) – 38:42	3–1
Manavian (S. Da Costa, Fleury) (PP2) – 42:17	4–1
Guttig (Perret, Douay) – 47:57	5–1
	5–2	54:46 – Vorobey (Platt, Korobov) (PP)
Perret (Leclerc, Hecquefeuille) (PP) – 57:56	6–2

10 min
Penalties
16 min
30
Shots
40

=== Czech Republic vs Slovakia ===
5 May 2018; 20:15	Czech Republic	3–2 OT (0–1, 1–1, 1–0) (OT: 1–0)	Slovakia	Royal Arena, Copenhagen; Attendance: 12,490

Game reference

Pavel Francouz
Goalies
Marek Čiliak
Referees:
(Finland) Mikko Kaukokari
(United States) Timothy Mayer
Linesmen:
(Sweden) Andreas Malmqvist
(Canada) Dustin McCrank

	0–1	07:33 – Krištof (Sekera, Nagy) (PP)
Kubalík (Nestrašil, Jaškin) – 21:04	1–1
	1–2	25:29 – Sekera (Nagy) (PP)
Nečas (Kubalík) (EA) – 59:50	2–2
Jaškin (Polášek, Nestrašil) – 62:09	3–2

6 min
Penalties
6 min
42
Shots
17

=== Austria vs Russia ===
6 May 2018; 12:15	Austria	0–7 (0–3, 0–3, 0–1)	Russia	Royal Arena, Copenhagen; Attendance: 9,502

Game reference

David Madlener
Goalies
Vasily Koshechkin
Igor Shestyorkin
Referees:
(United States) Timothy Mayer
(Switzerland) Tobias Wehrli
Linesmen:
(Czech Republic) Miroslav Lhotský
(Slovakia) Peter Šefčík

0–1	09:34 – Grigorenko
0–2	11:42 – Anisimov (Buchnevich)
0–3	13:19 – Barabanov (Mikheyev, Yakovlev)
0–4	23:52 – Grigorenko (Anisimov)
0–5	29:07 – Kaprizov (Datsyuk, Dadonov)
0–6	37:58 – Mamin (Kaprizov)
0–7	53:55 – Mikheyev

2 min
Penalties
2 min
18
Shots
41

=== Sweden vs Czech Republic ===
6 May 2018; 16:15	Sweden	3–2 (2–0, 0–1, 1–1)	Czech Republic	Royal Arena, Copenhagen; Attendance: 12,490

Game reference

Magnus Hellberg
Goalies
David Rittich
Referees:
(Austria) Mark Lemelin
(Russia) Konstantin Olenin
Linesmen:
(Switzerland) Nicolas Fluri
(Belarus) Dmitri Golyak

Rakell (Janmark-Nylén, Lindholm) – 04:49	1–0
Janmark-Nylén (Rakell) (PP) – 07:13	2–0
	2–1	33:10 – Hronek (Červenka, Hyka) (PP2)
Zibanejad (Rakell) – 43:11	3–1
	3–2	55:46 – Hyka (Faksa) (PP)

12 min
Penalties
10 min
27
Shots
25

=== Slovakia vs Switzerland ===
6 May 2018; 20:15	Slovakia	0–2 (0–1, 0–1, 0–0)	Switzerland	Royal Arena, Copenhagen; Attendance: 10,915

Game reference
Marek Čiliak	Goalies	Reto Berra	Referees: (Canada) Oliver Gouin (Czech Republic) Jan Hribik; Linesmen: (Russia) Gleb Lazarev (Sweden) Andreas Malmqvist
0–1 / 11:06 – Scherwey (Diaz, Müller); 0–2 / 20:22 – Müller (Scherwey) (SH)			Referees: (Canada) Oliver Gouin (Czech Republic) Jan Hribik; Linesmen: (Russia) Gleb Lazarev (Sweden) Andreas Malmqvist
6 min	Penalties	4 min	Referees: (Canada) Oliver Gouin (Czech Republic) Jan Hribik; Linesmen: (Russia) Gleb Lazarev (Sweden) Andreas Malmqvist
25	Shots	26	Referees: (Canada) Oliver Gouin (Czech Republic) Jan Hribik; Linesmen: (Russia) Gleb Lazarev (Sweden) Andreas Malmqvist

=== Belarus vs Russia ===
7 May 2018; 16:15	Belarus	0–6 (0–1, 0–3, 0–2)	Russia	Royal Arena, Copenhagen; Attendance: 6,360

Game reference

Vitali Trus
Goalies
Igor Shestyorkin
Referees:
(Finland) Mikko Kaukokari
(Sweden) Mikael Sjöqvist
Linesmen:
(Czech Republic) Miroslav Lhotský
(Canada) Dustin McCrank

0–1	05:27 – Datsyuk (Dadonov)
0–2	25:55 – Shalunov (Barabanov, Kablukov)
0–3	29:25 – Kablukov (Barabanov, Tryamkin)
0–4	39:26 – Datsyuk (Khafizullin, Shalunov) (PP)
0–5	45:16 – Mamin (Zaitsev)
0–6	47:37 – Kaprizov (Datsyuk, Dadonov)

4 min
Penalties
2 min
18
Shots
27

=== Sweden vs France ===
7 May 2018; 20:15	Sweden	4–0 (2–0, 1–0, 1–0)	France	Royal Arena, Copenhagen; Attendance: 7,218

Game reference

Anders Nilsson
Goalies
Ronan Quemener
Referees:
(Czech Republic) Jan Hribik
(Switzerland) Tobias Wehrli
Linesmen:
(Slovakia) Peter Šefčík
(Finland) Sakari Suominen

Rakell (A. Larsson, Janmark-Nylén) – 00:24	1–0
Backlund (Pettersson, Lindholm) (PP) – 05:54	2–0
Ekman-Larsson (A. Larsson, Kempe) – 27:51	3–0
Pettersson (Klingberg, Ekman-Larsson) (PP) – 55:40	4–0

12 min
Penalties
24 min
35
Shots
14

=== Austria vs Slovakia ===
8 May 2018; 16:15	Austria	2–4 (1–1, 0–2, 1–1)	Slovakia	Royal Arena, Copenhagen; Attendance: 6,094

Game reference

Bernhard Starkbaum
Goalies
Patrik Rybár
Referees:
(Canada) Brett Iverson
(Sweden) Mikael Sjöqvist
Linesmen:
(Switzerland) Nicolas Fluri
(Sweden) Andreas Malmqvist

Lebler (Hofer, Viveiros) – 01:33	1–0
	1–1	04:13 – Haščák (Hovorka, Ďaloga)
	1–2	22:13 – Jurčo (Nagy, Fehérváry)
	1–3	29:00 – Jaroš (Fehérváry, Svitana)
Schneider (Raffl) – 41:43	2–3
	2–4	59:29 – Krištof (ENG)

8 min
Penalties
4 min
22
Shots
30

=== Czech Republic vs Switzerland ===
8 May 2018; 20:15	Czech Republic	5–4 GWS (1–1, 3–3, 0–0) (OT: 0–0) (SO: 1–0)	Switzerland	Royal Arena, Copenhagen; Attendance: 6,226

Game reference

Pavel Francouz
Goalies
Leonardo Genoni
Referees:
(Russia) Roman Gofman
(United States) Stephen Reneau
Linesmen:
(Belarus) Dmitri Golyak
(Russia) Gleb Lazarev

	0–1	11:13 – Niederreiter (Hofmann) (PP)
Kubalík (Nečas) (PP) – 16:21	1–1
	1–2	20:47 – Hofmann (Andrighetto, Diaz) (PP)
	1–3	22:07 – Moser (Vermin, Müller)
Moravčík (Sklenička, Hyka) – 24:09	2–3
	2–4	27:21 – Niederreiter (Moser, Untersander) (PP)
Jaškin (Moravčík, Nestrašil) – 27:43	3–4
Řepík (Kubalík) – 34:26	4–4

Jaškin (miss)
Hyka (miss)
Nečas (miss)
Nestrašil (miss)
Řepík
Shootout
(miss) Rod
(miss) Andrighetto
(miss) Niederreiter
(miss) Corvi
(miss) Hofmann
26 min
Penalties
18 min
28
Shots
29

=== Switzerland vs Belarus ===
9 May 2018; 16:15	Switzerland	5–2 (2–2, 1–0, 2–0)	Belarus	Royal Arena, Copenhagen; Attendance: 5,445

Game reference

Reto Berra
Goalies
Mikhail Karnaukhov
Referees:
(Sweden) Linus Öhlund
(Finland) Aleksi Rantala
Linesmen:
(United States) Jake Davis
(Russia) Alexander Otmakhov

Vermin (Niederreiter, Untersander) – 01:37	1–0
	1–1	05:54 – Platt (Linglet, Dyukov)
	1–2	10:46 – Pavlovich (Kovyrshin, Materukhin)
Andrighetto (Meier) – 18:40	2–2
Vermin (Meier, Diaz) – 39:45	3–2
Corvi (Diaz) – 42:29	4–2
Meier (Andrighetto, Hofmann) (PP) – 46:44	5–2

8 min
Penalties
16 min
45
Shots
24

=== Sweden vs Austria ===
9 May 2018; 20:15	Sweden	7–0 (2–0, 3–0, 2–0)	Austria	Royal Arena, Copenhagen; Attendance: 8,547

Game reference

Anders Nilsson
Goalies
David Madlener
Referees:
(Slovakia) Jozef Kubuš
(Germany) Gordon Schukies
Linesmen:
(Germany) Lukas Kohlmüller
(Finland) Hannu Sormunen

Kempe (Lindholm) (PP) – 09:47	1–0
Janmark (Rakell) – 17:11	2–0
Rakell (Zibanejad, Janmark) (PP) – 22:42	3–0
Rakell – 28:53	4–0
Nyquist (Kempe) – 29:17	5–0
Zibanejad (Janmark, Andersson) – 47:50	6–0
Pääjärvi (J. Larsson) – 53:59	7–0

4 min
Penalties
8 min
38
Shots
14

=== Slovakia vs France ===
10 May 2018; 16:15	Slovakia	3–1 (1–0, 1–1, 1–0)	France	Royal Arena, Copenhagen; Attendance: 5,855

Game reference

Marek Čiliak
Goalies
Florian Hardy
Referees:
(Russia) Roman Gofman
(Czech Republic) Antonín Jeřábek
Linesmen:
(Denmark) Rene Jensen
(Norway) Jon Kilian

Bondra (Buc, Svitana) – 05:37	1–0
Buc (Svitana, Jaroš) – 22:03	2–0
	2–1	33:39 – Claireaux (Perret, Janil)
Čajkovský (Buc) (ENG) – 59:50	3–1

4 min
Penalties
8 min
28
Shots
14

=== Czech Republic vs Russia ===
10 May 2018; 20:15	Czech Republic	4–3 OT (2–1, 1–2, 0–0) (OT: 1–0)	Russia	Royal Arena, Copenhagen; Attendance: 12,490

Game reference

David Rittich
Goalies
Vasily Koshechkin
Referees:
(Canada) Brett Iverson
(Sweden) Linus Öhlund
Linesmen:
(United States) Jake Davis
(Canada) Nathan Vanoosten

	0–1	01:11 – Nesterov (Barabanov, Kablukov)
Krejčí (Jaškin, Gudas) – 14:41	1–1
Jaškin (Pastrňák, Krejčí) – 18:39	2–1
	2–2	21:00 – Grigorenko (Buchnevich, Anisimov)
Pastrňák (Krejčí) – 24:17	3–2
	3–3	25:49 – Barabanov (Zaitsev, Shalunov)
Pastrňák (Krejčí, Hronek) – 63:23	4–3

6 min
Penalties
4 min
25
Shots
23

=== France vs Austria ===
11 May 2018; 16:15	France	5–2 (2–1, 2–1, 1–0)	Austria	Royal Arena, Copenhagen; Attendance: 5,780

Game reference

Florian Hardy
Goalies
Bernhard Starkbaum
Referees:
(Czech Republic) Antonín Jeřábek
(United States) Stephen Reneau
Linesmen:
(United States) Brian Oliver
(Russia) Alexander Otmakhov

	0–1	03:32 – Hundertpfund (Heinrich, Schumnig)
Fleury (Da Costa, Rech) – 10:00	1–1
Treille (Texier, Hecquefeuille) (PP) – 13:10	2–1
	2–2	31:22 – Raffl (Heinrich, Komarek) (PP)
Fleury (Auvitu, Da Costa) (PP2) – 34:11	3–2
Da Costa (Texier, Gallet) – 37:49	4–2
Treille (Texier, Hecquefeuille) (PP) – 41:06	5–2

12 min
Penalties
14 min
30
Shots
36

=== Belarus vs Czech Republic ===
11 May 2018; 20:15	Belarus	0–3 (0–3, 0–0, 0–0)	Czech Republic	Royal Arena, Copenhagen; Attendance: 5,636

Game reference

Vitali Trus
Goalies
Pavel Francouz
Referees:
(Russia) Roman Gofman
(Germany) Gordon Schukies
Linesmen:
(Germany) Lukas Kohlmüller
(Finland) Hannu Sormunen

0–1	08:13 – Šulák (Krejčí) (PP)
0–2	15:53 – Horák (Plekanec)
0–3	18:43 – Řepík (Červenka, Moravčík)

14 min
Penalties
4 min
21
Shots
33

=== Slovakia vs Sweden ===
12 May 2018; 12:15	Slovakia	3–4 OT (1–2, 1–1, 1–0) (OT: 0–1)	Sweden	Royal Arena, Copenhagen; Attendance: 12,490

Game reference

Patrik Rybár
Goalies
Magnus Hellberg
Referees:
(Canada) Brett Iverson
(United States) Stephen Reneau
Linesmen:
(Denmark) Rene Jensen
(Germany) Lukas Kohlmüller

Jurčo (Grman, Krištof) – 10:32	1–0
	1–1	15:14 – Everberg (Klingberg, Lindholm)
	1–2	18:06 – Nyquist (Backlund, E. Gustafsson)
	1–3	24:53 – De la Rose (Kempe, Wikstrand)
Ďaloga (Nagy) (SH) – 36:40	2–3
Nagy (Krištof, Čajkovský) – 46:54	3–3
	3–4	64:18 – Zibanejad (Rakell, Klingberg (PP)

8 min
Penalties
2 min
28
Shots
33

=== Austria vs Belarus ===
12 May 2018; 16:15	Austria	4–0 (1–0, 3–0, 0–0)	Belarus	Royal Arena, Copenhagen; Attendance: 7,370

Game reference

Bernhard Starkbaum
Goalies
Mikhail Karnaukhov
Vitali Trus
Referees:
(Sweden) Linus Öhlund
(Finland) Aleksi Rantala
Linesmen:
(United States) Brian Oliver
(Canada) Nathan Vanoosten

Viveiros – 04:14	1–0
Komarek (Unterweger) (PP) – 30:38	2–0
Raffl (Komarek) (PP) – 34:38	3–0
Zwerger (Ulmer) (PP) – 39:36	4–0

10 min
Penalties
8 min
28
Shots
34

=== Russia vs Switzerland ===
12 May 2018; 20:15	Russia	4–3 (0–0, 3–1, 1–2)	Switzerland	Royal Arena, Copenhagen; Attendance: 12,366

Game reference

Vasily Koshechkin
Goalies
Reto Berra
Referees:
(Slovakia) Jozef Kubuš
(Germany) Gordon Schukies
Linesmen:
(United States) Jake Davis
(Norway) Jon Kilian

Kaprizov (Datsyuk, Gusev) – 22:22	1–0
	1–1	26:35 – Untersander (Kukan, Corvi) (PP)
Dadonov (Anisimov) – 27:47	2–1
Nesterov (Gusev, Datsyuk) (PP2) – 39:57	3–1
	3–2	51:52 Andrighetto (Meier, Vermin)
Grigorenko (Anisimov, Gavrikov) – 56:07	4–2
	4–3	58:12 Haas (Andrighetto, Niederreiter) (EA)

8 min
Penalties
8 min
23
Shots
27

=== France vs Czech Republic ===
13 May 2018; 16:15	France	0–6 (0–3, 0–2, 0–1)	Czech Republic	Royal Arena, Copenhagen; Attendance: 6,252

Game reference

Ronan Quemener
Sebastian Ylönen
Goalies
David Rittich
Referees:
(Slovakia) Jozef Kubuš
(Sweden) Linus Öhlund
Linesmen:
(Norway) Jon Kilian
(Canada) Nathan Vanoosten

0–1	03:41 – Pastrňák (Krejčí)
0–2	07:58 – Pastrňák (Jaškin)
0–3	14:11 – Jaškin (Krejčík)
0–4	21:37 – Horák (Kubalík, Šulák) (PP)
0–5	27:41 – Horák (Chytil, Sklenička)
0–6	50:32 – Nečas (Krejčík, Polášek)

22 min
Penalties
4 min
10
Shots
55

=== Switzerland vs Sweden ===
13 May 2018; 20:15	Switzerland	3–5 (0–2, 1–1, 2–2)	Sweden	Royal Arena, Copenhagen; Attendance: 12,255

Game reference

Leonardo Genoni
Goalies
Anders Nilsson
Referees:
(Czech Republic) Antonín Jeřábek
(Finland) Aleksi Rantala
Linesmen:
(Russia) Alexander Otmakhov
(Finland) Hannu Sormunen

	0–1	05:24 – Klingberg (Zibanejad, Ekman-Larsson) (PP)
	0–2	09:18 – Hörnqvist (Pettersson, Backlund) (PP)
	0–3	21:14 – Backlund (Lindholm)
Untersander (Corvi) – 38:32	1–3
Diaz (Fiala, Andrighetto) – 44:26	2–3
	2–4	52:59 – Larsson (Backlund)
	2–5	56:42 – Pääjärvi (Backlund) (ENG)
Kukan (Untersander) (PP) – 59:17	3–5

6 min
Penalties
8 min
23
Shots
41

=== Russia vs Slovakia ===
14 May 2018; 16:15	Russia	4–0 (2–0, 0–0, 2–0)	Slovakia	Royal Arena, Copenhagen; Attendance: 7,732

Game reference

Igor Shestyorkin
Goalies
Marek Čiliak
Referees:
(Austria) Mark Lemelin
(Finland) Aleksi Rantala
Linesmen:
(Germany) Lukas Kohlmüller
(United States) Brian Oliver

Mamin (Soshnikov) – 11:10	1–0
Gusev (Datsyuk, Zaitsev) – 16:50	2–0
Shalunov (Soshnikov) (ENG) – 58:49	3–0
Mikheyev (Barabanov, Shalunov) (ENG) – 59:44	4–0

6 min
Penalties
6 min
36
Shots
23

=== Czech Republic vs Austria ===
14 May 2018; 20:15	Czech Republic	4–3 (2–1, 1–0, 1–2)	Austria	Royal Arena, Copenhagen; Attendance: 3,843

Game reference

Pavel Francouz
Goalies
David Kickert
Referees:
(Russia) Konstantin Olenin
(Germany) Gordon Schukies
Linesmen:
(Denmark) Rene Jensen
(Russia) Alexander Otmakhov

Hyka (Kubalík, Šulák) – 00:31	1–0
Chytil (Krejčík) – 02:27	2–0
	2–1	17:45 – Komarek (Hofer)
Kubalík (Hyka, Nečas) – 25:46	3–1
Hyka (Faksa, Kubalík) (PP) – 49:51	4–1
	4–2	50:53 – Raffl (Unterweger, Haudum)
	4–3	57:18 – Raffl (Komarek, Schumnig)

8 min
Penalties
4 min
39
Shots
27

=== Switzerland vs France ===
15 May 2018; 12:15	Switzerland	5–1 (2–0, 1–0, 2–1)	France	Royal Arena, Copenhagen; Attendance: 6,573

Game reference

Leonardo Genoni
Goalies
Florian Hardy
Referees:
(Russia) Konstantin Olenin
(Germany) Gordon Schukies
Linesmen:
(United States) Jake Davis
(Denmark) Rene Jensen

Hofmann (Hass, Müller) – 12:21	1–0
Corvi (Niederreiter, Meier) – 15:09	2–0
Untersander (Josi, Corvi) (PP) – 37:12	3–0
Fiala (Haas, Fora) (EA) – 42:21	4–0
	4–1	43:10 – Leclerc (Chakiachvili, Perret)
Moser (Vermin, Müller) (SH) – 53:46	5–1

8 min
Penalties
8 min
34
Shots
20

=== Belarus vs Slovakia ===
15 May 2018; 16:15	Belarus	4–7 (0–2, 2–0, 2–5)	Slovakia	Royal Arena, Copenhagen; Attendance: 4,857

Game reference

Vitali Trus
Goalies
Patrik Rybár
Marek Čiliak
Referees:
(Czech Republic) Jan Hribik
(Austria) Mark Lemelin
Linesmen:
(Norway) Jon Kilian
(United States) Brian Oliver

	0–1	00:18 – Bakoš (Nagy, Sekera)
	0–2	10:07 – Jurčo (Bakoš, Nagy) (PP)
Kitarov (Drozd, Falkovsky) (SH) – 33:24	1–2
Linglet (Levsha, Platt) (PP) – 35:00	2–2
	2–3	47:53 – Bakoš (Nagy)
Kovyrshin (Sushko, Pavlovich) – 48:37	3–3
Vorobey (Sharangovich, Platt) (PP) – 50:18	4–3
	4–4	51:17 – Jurčo (Bakoš, Nagy)
	4–5	54:57 – Hovorka (Krištof)
	4–6	55:48 – Ďaloga (PS)
	4–7	59:42 – Krištof (Jurčo, Nagy) (PP)

8 min
Penalties
12 min
24
Shots
46

=== Russia vs Sweden ===
15 May 2018; 20:15	Russia	1–3 (1–0, 0–2, 0–1)	Sweden	Royal Arena, Copenhagen; Attendance: 12,490

Game reference

Vasily Koshechkin
Goalies
Anders Nilsson
Referees:
(Canada) Oliver Gouin
(United States) Timothy Mayer
Linesmen:
(Finland) Hannu Sormunen
(Canada) Nathan Vanoosten

Kaprizov (Gusev, Datsyuk) (PP) – 02:44	1–0
	1–1	29:27 – Zibanejad (Ekman-Larsson, Nyquist) (PP)
	1–2	36:04 – Rakell (Zibanejad, Janmark)
	1–3	58:55 – Ekholm (Nilsson) (ENG)

4 min
Penalties
14 min
31
Shots
29
