= 2018 IIHF World Championship playoff round =

The playoff round of the 2018 IIHF World Championship was held from 17 to 20 May 2018. The top four-placed teams of each preliminary group qualified for the playoff round.

== Qualified teams ==
Group	Winners	Runners-up	Third place	Fourth place
A	Sweden	Russia	Czech Republic	Switzerland
B	Finland	United States	Canada	Latvia

== Bracket ==
Quarterfinals
17 May
Sweden	3
Latvia	2
17 May
United States	3
Czech Republic	2
17 May
Russia	4
Canada (OT)	5
17 May
Finland	2
Switzerland	3

Semifinals
19 May
Sweden	6
United States	0
19 May
Canada	2
Switzerland	3

Final
20 May
Sweden (GWS)	3
Switzerland	2
Third place
20 May
United States	4
Canada	1

All times are local (UTC+2).

== Quarterfinals ==
17 May 2018; 16:15	Russia	4–5 OT (0–1, 2–1, 2–2) (OT: 0–1)	Canada	Royal Arena, Copenhagen; Attendance: 9,017

Game reference

Igor Shestyorkin
Goalies
Darcy Kuemper
Referees:
(Austria) Mark Lemelin
(Finland) Aleksi Rantala
Linesmen:
(United States) Brian Oliver
(Finland) Hannu Sormunen

	0–1	04:45 – Parayko (McDavid, Eberle) (PP)
	0–2	31:51 – Nugent-Hopkins (McDavid, Parayko) (PP)
Mikheyev (Anisimov, Zaitsev) – 32:53	1–2
Barabanov (Dadonov) (EA) – 37:32	2–2
	2–3	47:11 – Turris (Schwartz)
Andronov (Zaitsev, Soshnikov) – 48:44	3–3
	3–4	52:36 – Dubois (Jost)
Anisimov (Grigorenko, Zaitsev) – 54:34	4–4
	4–5	64:57 – O'Reilly (McDavid, Ekblad) (PP)

8 min
Penalties
2 min
30
Shots
41

17 May 2018; 16:15	United States	3–2 (2–0, 0–2, 1–0)	Czech Republic	Jyske Bank Boxen, Herning; Attendance: 4,846

Game reference

Keith Kinkaid
Goalies
Pavel Francouz
Referees:
(Finland) Mikko Kaukokari
(Slovakia) Jozef Kubuš
Linesmen:
(Canada) Dustin McCrank
(Finland) Sakari Suominen

Kane (Ryan) – 10:36	1–0
Atkinson (Bonino, Gaudreau) – 12:19	2–0
	2–1	24:56 – Řepík (Faksa, Gudas)
	2–2	30:55 – Nečas (Pastrňák, Hronek) (PP)
Kane (Ryan) – 46:58	3–2

10 min
Penalties
2 min
31
Shots
26

17 May 2018; 20:15	Sweden	3–2 (0–0, 1–1, 2–1)	Latvia	Royal Arena, Copenhagen; Attendance: 12,490

Game reference

Anders Nilsson
Goalies
Elvis Merzļikins
Referees:
(United States) Timothy Mayer
(Russia) Konstantin Olenin
Linesmen:
(Germany) Lukas Kohlmüller
(Russia) Alexander Otmakhov

Forsberg (Kempe, Ekman-Larsson) – 26:36	1–0
	1–1	31:59 – Bļugers (Ri. Bukarts)
Arvidsson (Ekholm) – 41:49	2–1
Ekman-Larsson (Kempe, Rakell) (PP) – 46:27	3–1
	3–2	50:21 – Balcers (Ķēniņš)

10 min
Penalties
2 min
34
Shots
24

17 May 2018; 20:15	Finland	2–3 (1–0, 0–3, 1–0)	Switzerland	Jyske Bank Boxen, Herning; Attendance: 5,634

Game reference

Harri Säteri
Goalies
Leonardo Genoni
Referees:
(Czech Republic) Antonín Jeřábek
(United States) Stephen Reneau
Linesmen:
(Russia) Gleb Lazarev
(Czech Republic) Miroslav Lhotský

Nutivaara (Koivisto, Rantanen) – 07:01	1–0
	1–1	29:13 – Corvi (Fiala, Niederreiter)
	1–2	32:32 – Vermin (Meier)
	1–3	33:08 – Hofmann (Moser, Fora)
Rantanen (Savinainen, Aho) (PP) – 48:20	2–3

0 min
Penalties
8 min
34
Shots
27

== Semifinals ==
19 May 2018; 15:15	Sweden	6–0 (1–0, 3–0, 2–0)	United States	Royal Arena, Copenhagen; Attendance: 12,490

Game reference

Anders Nilsson
Goalies
Keith Kinkaid
Referees:
(Russia) Roman Gofman
(Canada) Oliver Gouin
Linesmen:
(Canada) Dustin McCrank
(Canada) Nathan Vanoosten

Arvidsson (De la Rose, Forsberg) – 14:43	1–0
Pääjärvi (Backlund) (SH) – 27:09	2–0
Hörnqvist (Backlund, Klingberg) (PP) – 30:05	3–0
Janmark-Nylén (Rakell) – 30:16	4–0
Arvidsson (Zibanejad) (ENG) – 51:07	5–0
Kempe (Backlund) – 57:01	6–0

14 min
Penalties
6 min
20
Shots
41

19 May 2018; 19:15	Canada	2–3 (0–1, 1–1, 1–1)	Switzerland	Royal Arena, Copenhagen; Attendance: 12,166

Game reference

Darcy Kuemper
Goalies
Leonardo Genoni
Referees:
(Finland) Mikko Kaukokari
(Slovakia) Jozef Kubuš
Linesmen:
(Czech Republic) Miroslav Lhotský
(United States) Brian Oliver

	0–1	18:41 – Scherwey (Untersander, Kukan)
Horvat (Dubois, Pageau) – 27:20	1–1
	1–2	29:40 – Hofmann (Fiala, Andrighetto) (PP)
	1–3	44:14 – Haas (Andrighetto, Diaz) (PP)
Parayko (McDavid, Schenn) (EA) – 57:53	2–3

6 min
Penalties
2 min
45
Shots
17

== Bronze medal game ==
20 May 2018; 15:45	United States	4–1 (0–0, 1–1, 3–0)	Canada	Royal Arena, Copenhagen; Attendance: 12,111

Game reference

Keith Kinkaid
Goalies
Curtis McElhinney
Referees:
(Finland) Mikko Kaukokari
(Slovakia) Jozef Kubuš
Linesmen:
(Czech Republic) Miroslav Lhotský
(Finland) Sakari Suominen

Kreider (Larkin, DeBrincat) (PP) – 26:40	1–0
	1–1	38:06 – Vlasic (Horvat, Turris)
Bonino (Kane) (PP) – 53:21	2–1
Lee (McAvoy) (ENG) – 57:45	3–1
Kreider (ENG) – 58:18	4–1

4 min
Penalties
14 min
37
Shots
25

== Gold medal game ==
20 May 2018; 20:15 (UTC+2)	Sweden	3–2 GWS (1–1, 1–1, 0–0) (OT: 0–0) (SO: 1–0)	Switzerland	Royal Arena, Copenhagen; Attendance: 12,490

Game reference

Anders Nilsson
Goalies
Leonardo Genoni
Referees:
(Russia) Roman Gofman
(Canada) Oliver Gouin
Linesmen:
(Russia) Gleb Lazarev
(Canada) Nathan Vanoosten

	0–1	16:38 – Niederreiter (Josi, Fiala)
Nyquist (Ekholm) – 17:54	1–1
	1–2	23:13 – Meier (Corvi, Josi) (PP)
Zibanejad (Ekman-Larsson) (PP) – 34:53	2–2

Zibanejad (miss)
Rakell (miss)
Ekman-Larsson
Forsberg
Shootout
Andrighetto
(miss) Fiala
(miss) Corvi
(miss) Haas
(miss) Niederreiter
4 min
Penalties
10 min
38
Shots
27
