= 2018 IIHF World Championship final =

Ice hockey match

| | 1 | 2 | 3 | OT | SO | Total |
|---|---|---|---|---|---|---|
| Switzerland | 1 | 1 | 0 | 0 | 0 | 2 |
| Sweden | 1 | 1 | 0 | 0 | 1 | 3 |
- Date: 20 May 2018
- Arena: Royal Arena
- City: Copenhagen
- Attendance: 12,490

The 2018 IIHF World Championship final was played at the Royal Arena in Copenhagen, Denmark, on 20 May 2018.

Sweden defeated Switzerland in game-winning shots after the score was tied 2–2 following regulation time and a 20-minute overtime period.

== Road to the final ==
Sweden
Round
Switzerland
Opponent
Result
Preliminary round
Opponent
Result
Belarus
5–0
Game 1
Austria
3–2 (OT)
Czech Republic
3–2
Game 2
Slovakia
2–0
France
4–0
Game 3
Czech Republic
4–5 (GWS)
Austria
7–0
Game 4
Belarus
5–2
Slovakia
4–3 (OT)
Game 5
Russia
3–4
Switzerland
5–3
Game 6
Sweden
3–5
Russia
3–1
Game 7
France
5–1

| Pos | Team | Pld | Pts |
|---|---|---|---|
| 1 | Sweden | 7 | 20 |
| 2 | Russia | 7 | 16 |
| 3 | Czech Republic | 7 | 15 |
| 4 | Switzerland | 7 | 12 |
| 5 | Slovakia | 7 | 11 |
| 6 | France | 7 | 6 |
| 7 | Austria | 7 | 4 |
| 8 | Belarus (R) | 7 | 0 |

Source: IIHF
(R) Relegated
Preliminary

| Pos | Team | Pld | Pts |
|---|---|---|---|
| 1 | Sweden | 7 | 20 |
| 2 | Russia | 7 | 16 |
| 3 | Czech Republic | 7 | 15 |
| 4 | Switzerland | 7 | 12 |
| 5 | Slovakia | 7 | 11 |
| 6 | France | 7 | 6 |
| 7 | Austria | 7 | 4 |
| 8 | Belarus (R) | 7 | 0 |

Source: IIHF
(R) Relegated
Opponent
Result
Playoff
Opponent
Result
Latvia
3–2
Quarterfinals
Finland
3–2
United States
6–0
Semifinals
Canada
3–2

== Match ==
| 20 May 2018; 20:15 (UTC+2) | Sweden | 3–2 GWS (1–1, 1–1, 0–0) (OT: 0–0) (SO: 1–0) | Switzerland | Royal Arena, Copenhagen; Attendance: 12,490 |

Game reference

Anders Nilsson
Goalies
Leonardo Genoni
Referees:
(Russia) Roman Gofman
(Canada) Oliver Gouin
Linesmen:
(Russia) Gleb Lazarev
(Canada) Nathan Vanoosten

| | 0–1 | 16:38 – Niederreiter (Josi, Fiala) |
| Nyquist (Ekholm) – 17:54 | 1–1 |
| | 1–2 | 23:13 – Meier (Corvi, Josi) (PP) |
| Zibanejad (Ekman-Larsson) (PP) – 34:53 | 2–2 |

Zibanejad (miss)
Rakell (miss)
Ekman-Larsson
Forsberg
Shootout
Andrighetto
(miss) Fiala
(miss) Corvi
(miss) Haas
(miss) Niederreiter
4 min
Penalties
10 min
38
Shots
27
