= Pavel Vorobey =

Belarusian ice hockey player

- Born: 10 September 1997 (age 28) Minsk, Belarus
- Height: 6 ft 3 in (191 cm)
- Weight: 194 lb (88 kg; 13 st 12 lb)
- Position: Defence
- Shot: Right
- Played for: Kunlun Red Star; Sibir Novosibirsk; Lahti Pelicans; HC Vityaz; Orlando Solar Bears
- National team: Belarus
- NHL draft: Undrafted
- Playing career: 2015–2023

Pavel Vorobey (born 10 September 1997) is a Belarusian former professional ice hockey defenceman.

== Playing career ==
He previously played with Kunlun Red Star and Sibir Novosibirsk and HC Vityaz in the Kontinental Hockey League (KHL). He joined Kunlun Red star from HC Dinamo Molodechno in the Belarusian Extraliga. He briefly enjoyed a loan stint during the 2019–20 season with Finnish club, Lahti Pelicans.

== International play ==
Vorobey is a part of the Belarusian national team and participated in the 2017 IIHF World Championship.

== Career statistics ==
=== Regular season and playoffs ===
			Regular season					Playoffs
Season	Team	League	GP	G	A	Pts	PIM	GP	G	A	Pts	PIM
2013–14	Yunost Minsk	MHL	11	0	0	0	4	—	—	—	—	—
2014–15	Yunost Minsk	MHL	50	5	3	8	50	4	0	0	0	0
2015–16	Dinamo-Shinnik U20	BXL	27	0	5	5	20	—	—	—	—	—
2015–16	Yunost Minsk	MHL-B	14	4	9	13	14	7	1	2	3	4
2016–17	Belarus U20	BXL	23	7	14	21	12	—	—	—	—	—
2016–17	Dinamo-Molodechno	BXL	13	0	2	2	0	5	0	0	0	0
2017–18	Kunlun Red Star	KHL	52	4	8	12	14	—	—	—	—	—
2017–18	KRS Heilongjiang	VHL	8	3	4	7	2	—	—	—	—	—
2018–19	KRS-ORG Beijing	VHL	3	1	1	2	2	—	—	—	—	—
2018–19	HC Sibir Novosibirsk	KHL	27	0	2	2	33	—	—	—	—	—
2018–19	Metallurg Novokuznetsk	VHL	8	1	4	5	4	3	0	0	0	6
2019–20	Lahti Pelicans	Liiga	15	1	3	4	10	—	—	—	—	—
2019–20	HC Vityaz Podolsk	KHL	14	2	4	6	4	—	—	—	—	—
2019–20	Dynamo St. Petersburg	VHL	2	1	0	1	0	—	—	—	—	—
2020–21	HC Vityaz Podolsk	KHL	25	1	2	3	6	—	—	—	—	—
2021–22	Orlando Solar Bears	ECHL	4	0	1	1	0	—	—	—	—	—
2021–22	Indy Fuel	ECHL	6	0	1	1	2	—	—	—	—	—
2021–22	Jacksonville Icemen	ECHL	22	7	4	11	12	2	0	0	0	0
2022–23	Orlando Solar Bears	ECHL	26	1	5	6	12	—	—	—	—	—
KHL totals			118	7	16	23	57	—	—	—	—	—
ECHL totals			58	8	11	19	26	2	0	0	0	0

=== International ===
Year	Team	Event	GP	G	A	Pts	PIM
2015	Belarus U18	WJC-18 (D1A)	5	1	1	2	6
2016	Belarus U20	WJC-20	6	0	1	1	6
2017	Belarus U20	WJC-20 (D1A)	5	1	3	4	4
2017	Belarus	WC	5	0	1	1	8
2018	Belarus	WC	7	2	1	3	2
Junior totals			16	2	5	7	16
Senior totals			12	2	2	4	10
