= Vitali Trus =

Belarusian ice hockey player

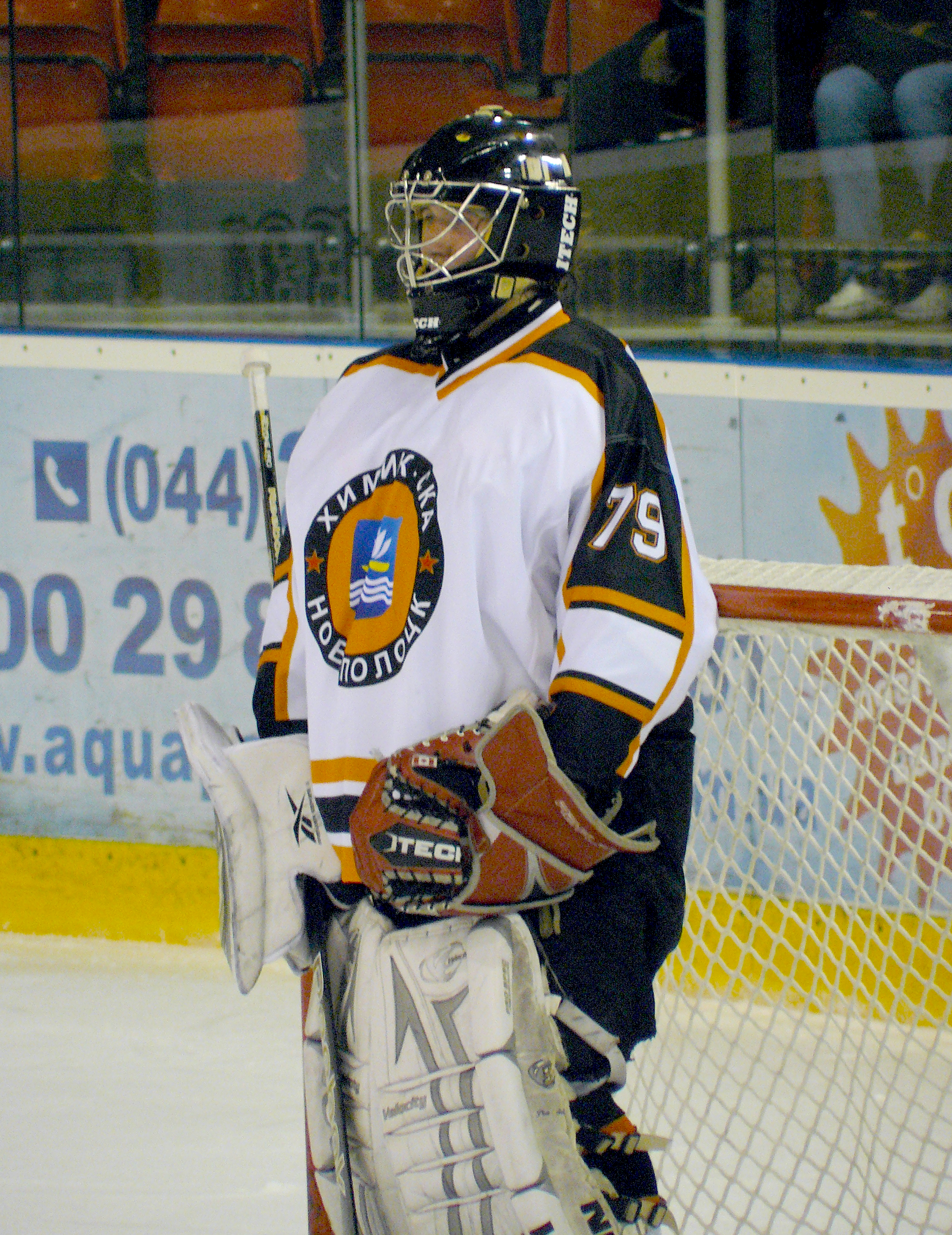
- Born: 24 June 1988 (age 36); Novopolotsk, Soviet Union
- Height: 6 ft 0 in (183 cm)
- Weight: 172 lb (78 kg; 12 st 4 lb)
- Position: Goaltender
- Catches: Left
- BXL team Former teams: HK Neman Grodno; Khimik-SKA Novopolotsk; Dynamo Kharkov; HC Shakhtyor Soligorsk
- National team: Belarus
- Playing career: 2004–present

Vitali Trus (born 24 June 1988) is a Belarusian ice hockey player for HK Neman Grodno and the Belarusian national team.

He participated at the 2017 IIHF World Championship.
