= Jonathan Janil =

French ice hockey player

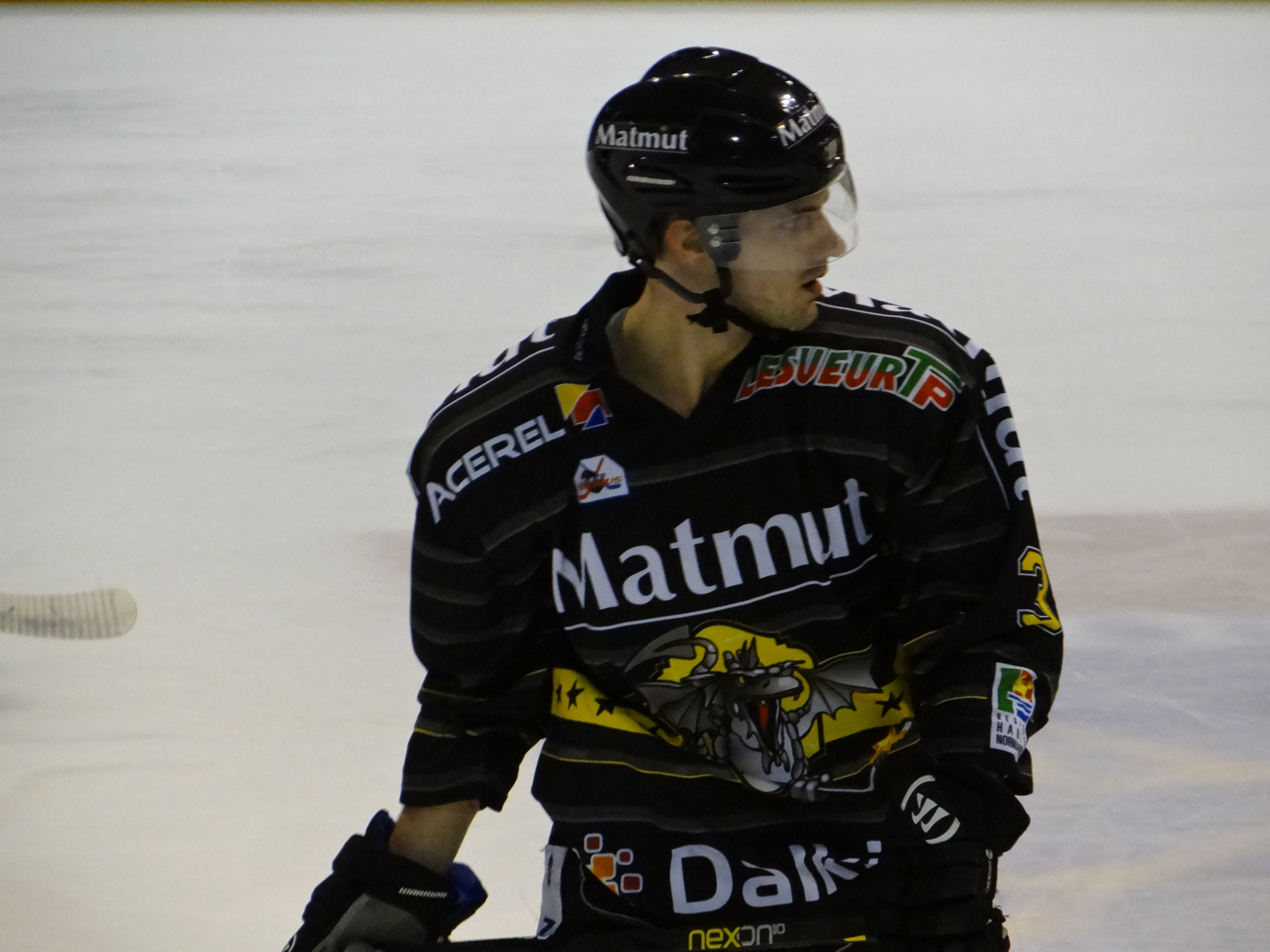
- Born: 24 September 1987 (age 38) Caen, France
- Height: 6 ft 2 in (188 cm)
- Weight: 205 lb (93 kg; 14 st 9 lb)
- Position: Defence
- Shoots: Right
- Magnus team Former teams: Boxers de Bordeaux; Drakkars de Caen; Dragons de Rouen
- National team: France
- NHL draft: Undrafted
- Playing career: 2005–present

Jonathan Janil (born 24 September 1987) is a French professional ice hockey defenceman who plays for Boxers de Bordeaux in the Ligue Magnus. He played for France at the 2011 IIHF World Championship and the 2018 IIHF World Championship.

Janil's father is a native of Saint Pierre and Miquelon, and he still has family on the island whom he regularly visits.
