= Florian Hardy =

French ice hockey player

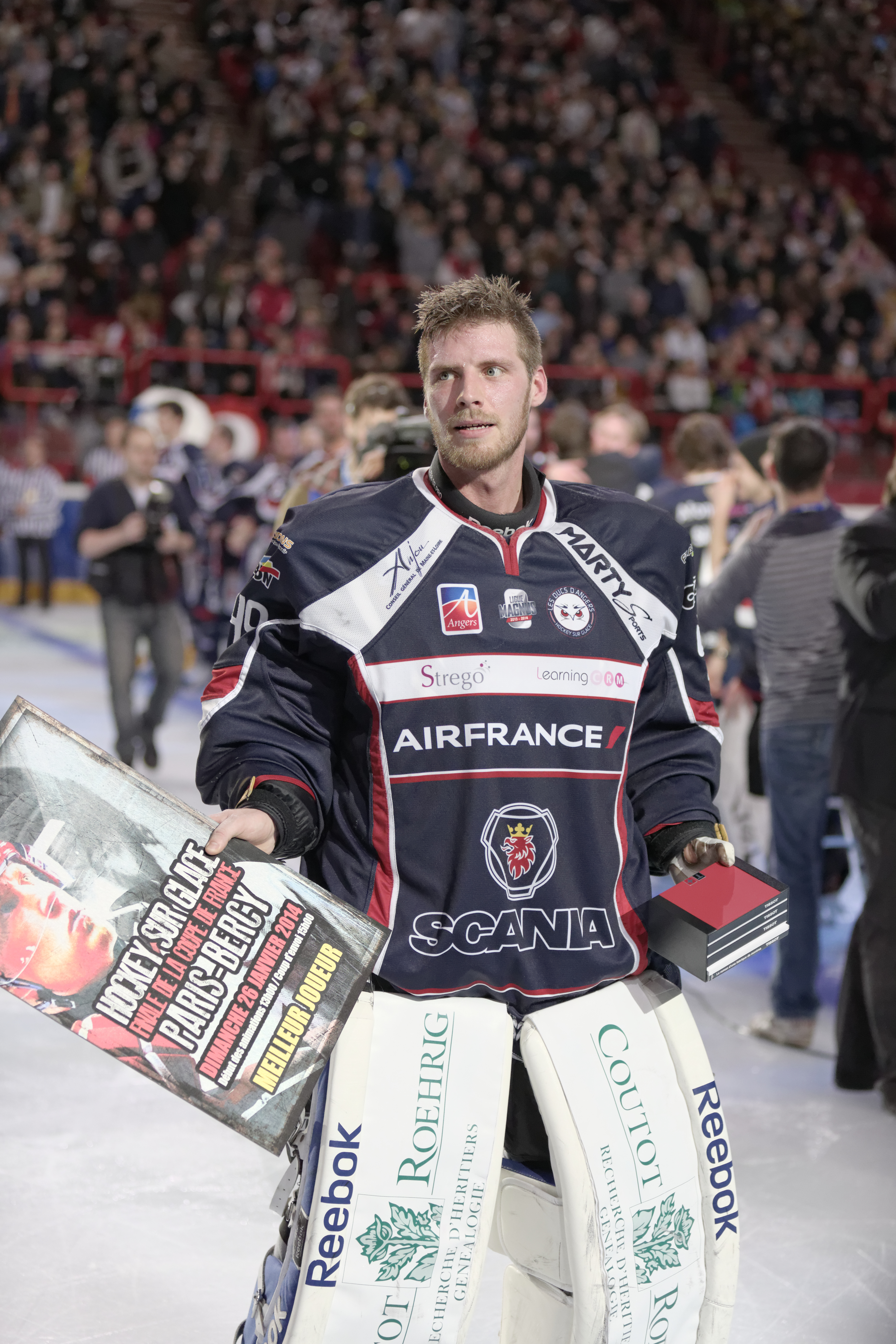
- Hardy with Angers in 2014
- Born: February 8, 1985 (age 41) Nantes, France
- Height: 6 ft 0 in (183 cm)
- Weight: 183 lb (83 kg; 13 st 1 lb)
- Position: Goaltender
- Catches: Left
- Ligue Magnus team Former teams: Ducs d'Angers; Ducs d'Angers; Pingouins de Morzine-Avoriaz; Ducs de Dijon; Chamonix HC; EHC München
- National team: France
- Playing career: 2005–present

Florian Hardy (born February 8, 1985) is a French professional ice hockey goaltender who is currently playing with Ducs d'Angers of Ligue Magnus France. Hardy joined Dornbirner on June 24, 2015, after his first season in the DEL with EHC München.

== International ==
Hardy was named to the France men's national ice hockey team for the 2010 IIHF World Championship. He was also selected for competition at the 2014 IIHF World Championship and the 2017 IIHF World Championship. Hardy was awarded Player of the Game award in a 5–1 victory against Finland at the 2017 IIHF World Championships. The award was originally awarded to Pierre-Édouard Bellemare, but Bellemare refused to accept the award and gave it to Hardy instead. Hardy saved 42 out of 43 shots in the 5–1 victory.
