= Simon Moser =

Swiss ice hockey player (born 1989)

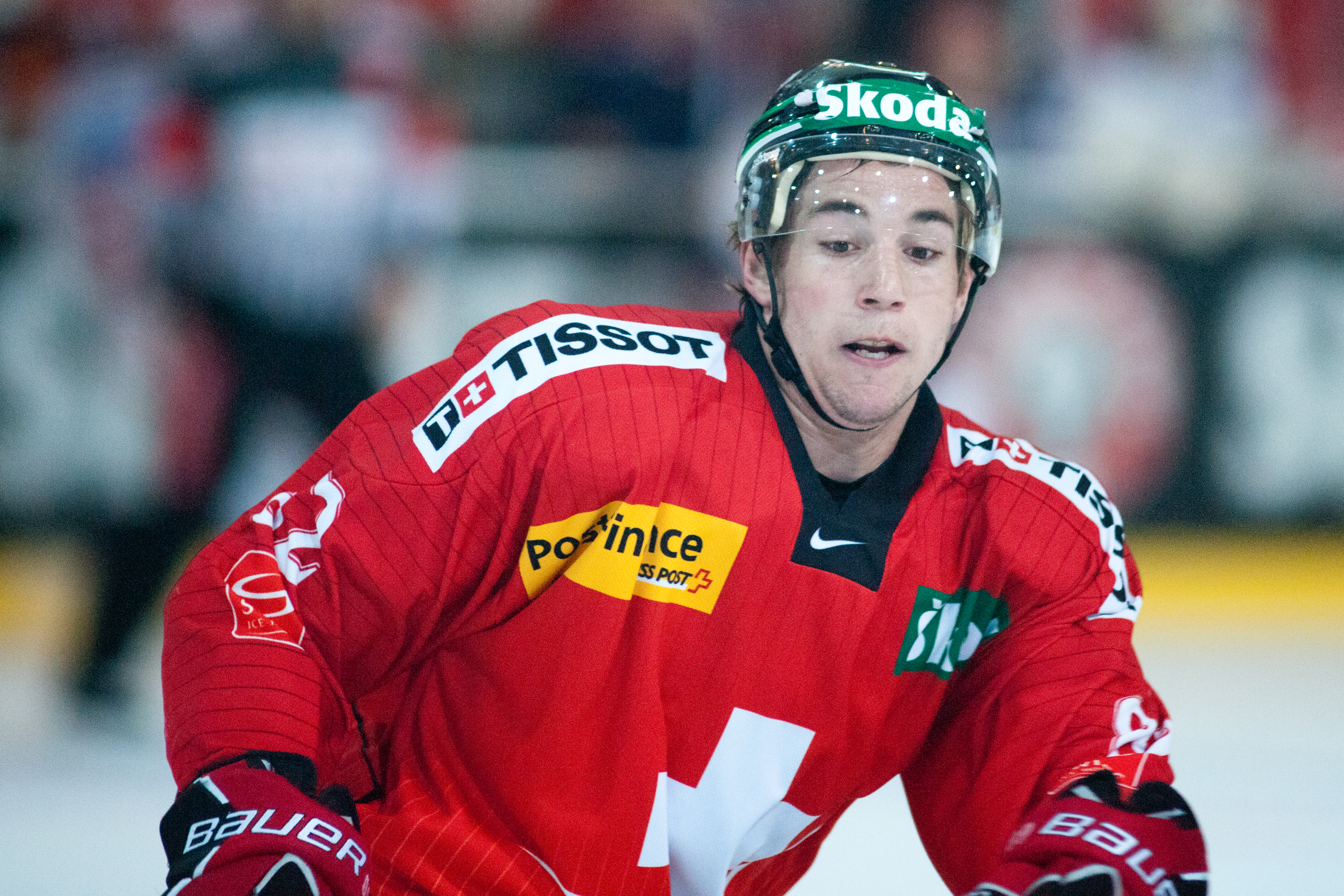
- Moser in 2011
- Born: March 10, 1989 (age 37) Bern, Switzerland
- Height: 6 ft 2 in (188 cm)
- Weight: 216 lb (98 kg; 15 st 6 lb)
- Position: Left wing
- Shoots: Left
- NL team Former teams: SC Bern; SCL Tigers; Nashville Predators
- National team: Switzerland
- NHL draft: Undrafted
- Playing career: 2007–present

Simon Moser (born March 10, 1989) is a Swiss professional ice hockey player who currently serves as captain of SC Bern of the National League (NL). He has formerly played in the National Hockey League with the Nashville Predators.

== Playing career ==
He participated in the 2011 IIHF World Championship, 2012 IIHF World Championship, and 2013 IIHF World Championship as a member of the Switzerland men's national ice hockey team.

While playing for the Swiss team at the 2012 IIHF World Championship, he fell awkwardly on the ice and as a result, he tore his ACL. He had to undergo season-ending surgery and turned down the Chicago Blackhawks training camp invitation. He came back to play the 35 remaining games in the 2012–13 NLA season, collecting 21 points (10G 11A).

At the end of the 2012–13 season, his team, the SCL Tigers, were relegated to the National League B. He then became a free agent before agreeing to a two-year contract with the SC Bern on June 7, 2013. Before signing with Bern, Moser accepted a try-out with the Nashville Predators' 2013 training camp. Upon impressing on the eve of the 2013–14 season opener, Moser opted to use his NHL out clause with Bern and sign a one-year entry-level contract with Nashville on September 30, 2013.

He was initially reassigned to the AHL affiliate, the Milwaukee Admirals, to begin the season. However, on February 1, 2014, he was recalled to Nashville and made his NHL debut against the St. Louis Blues. Moser appeared in 6 games at the NHL level in the 2013–14 season. He scored his first NHL goal on March 1, 2014, in a 3–1 loss to the Winnipeg Jets.

After his one-year contract with the Predators, Moser rejected a contract extension offer with Nashville and opted to return to his native Switzerland, signing an initial one-year contract with SC Bern on July 31, 2014. During the 2014–15 season with the Black Bears, Moser re-signed to an improved three-year contract with an NHL out-clause option with Bern on January 13, 2015.

Before the 2017–18 season, Moser was named captain of SC Bern, replacing Martin Plüss.

== Career statistics ==
=== Regular season and playoffs ===
			Regular season					Playoffs
Season	Team	League	GP	G	A	Pts	PIM	GP	G	A	Pts	PIM
2005–06	SCL Tigers	SUI U20	36	7	7	14	44	5	3	1	4	—
2006–07	SCL Tigers	SUI U20	38	33	35	68	40	8	7	2	9	4
2006–07	EHC Thun	SUI.3	10	5	4	9	10	2	1	2	3	0
2007–08	SCL Tigers	SUI U20	5	0	1	1	16	4	3	1	4	6
2007–08	SCL Tigers	NLA	4	1	0	1	0	—	—	—	—	—
2007–08	HC Martigny	SUI.2	36	7	5	12	72	—	—	—	—	—
2007–08	Schweiz U20	SUI.2	6	0	0	0	0	—	—	—	—	—
2008–09	SCL Tigers	NLA	47	7	6	13	37	—	—	—	—	—
2008–09	Schweiz U20	SUI.2	3	2	0	2	6	—	—	—	—	—
2009–10	SCL Tigers	NLA	50	9	9	18	28	—	—	—	—	—
2010–11	SCL Tigers	NLA	46	11	12	23	20	4	2	0	2	2
2011–12	SCL Tigers	NLA	50	18	16	34	50	—	—	—	—	—
2012–13	SCL Tigers	NLA	35	10	11	21	44	—	—	—	—	—
2013–14	Milwaukee Admirals	AHL	48	8	18	26	8	3	0	0	0	0
2013–14	Nashville Predators	NHL	6	1	1	2	2	—	—	—	—	—
2014–15	SC Bern	NLA	28	5	2	7	18	11	0	1	1	4
2015–16	SC Bern	NLA	50	16	17	33	48	14	2	6	8	8
2016–17	SC Bern	NLA	50	11	23	34	43	16	4	8	12	33
2017–18	SC Bern	NL	33	9	23	32	28	11	5	2	7	2
2018–19	SC Bern	NL	50	17	19	36	55	18	6	4	10	20
2019–20	SC Bern	NL	50	16	21	37	28	—	—	—	—	—
2020–21	SC Bern	NL	48	11	8	19	26	9	2	1	3	4
2021–22	SC Bern	NL	48	10	21	31	20	—	—	—	—	—
NL totals			589	151	188	339	445	83	21	22	43	73
NHL totals			6	1	1	2	2	—	—	—	—	—

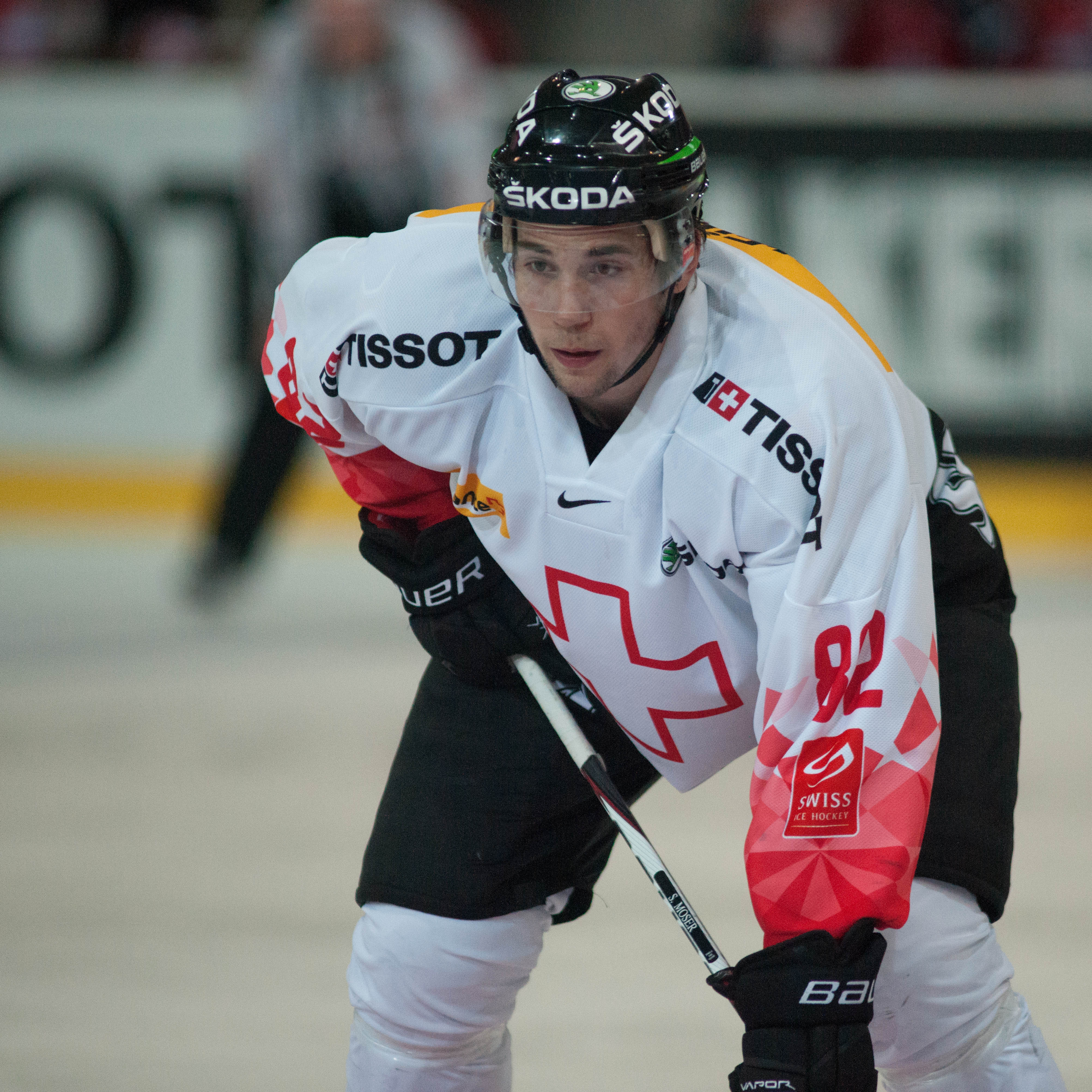

Medal record

Ice hockey

Representing Switzerland

World Championships
Silver medal – second place	2013 Sweden/Finland	
Silver medal – second place	2018 Denmark	

=== International ===
Year	Team	Event	Result	GP	G	A	Pts	PIM
2007	Switzerland	WJC18	6th	6	0	1	1	4
2009	Switzerland	WJC D1	11th	5	5	1	6	2
2011	Switzerland	WC	9th	6	0	2	2	0
2012	Switzerland	WC	11th	2	2	0	2	0
2013	Switzerland	WC	2nd place, silver medalist(s)	10	3	2	5	6
2014	Switzerland	OG	9th	4	1	0	1	2
2014	Switzerland	WC	10th	7	0	2	2	6
2016	Switzerland	WC	11th	7	3	3	6	6
2018	Switzerland	OG	10th	4	2	1	3	0
2018	Switzerland	WC	2nd place, silver medalist(s)	10	2	2	4	4
2019	Switzerland	WC	8th	8	2	2	4	2
2022	Switzerland	OG	8th	5	0	0	0	2
Junior totals				11	5	2	7	6
Senior totals				63	15	14	29	28
