= Raphael Diaz =

Swiss ice hockey player (born 1986)

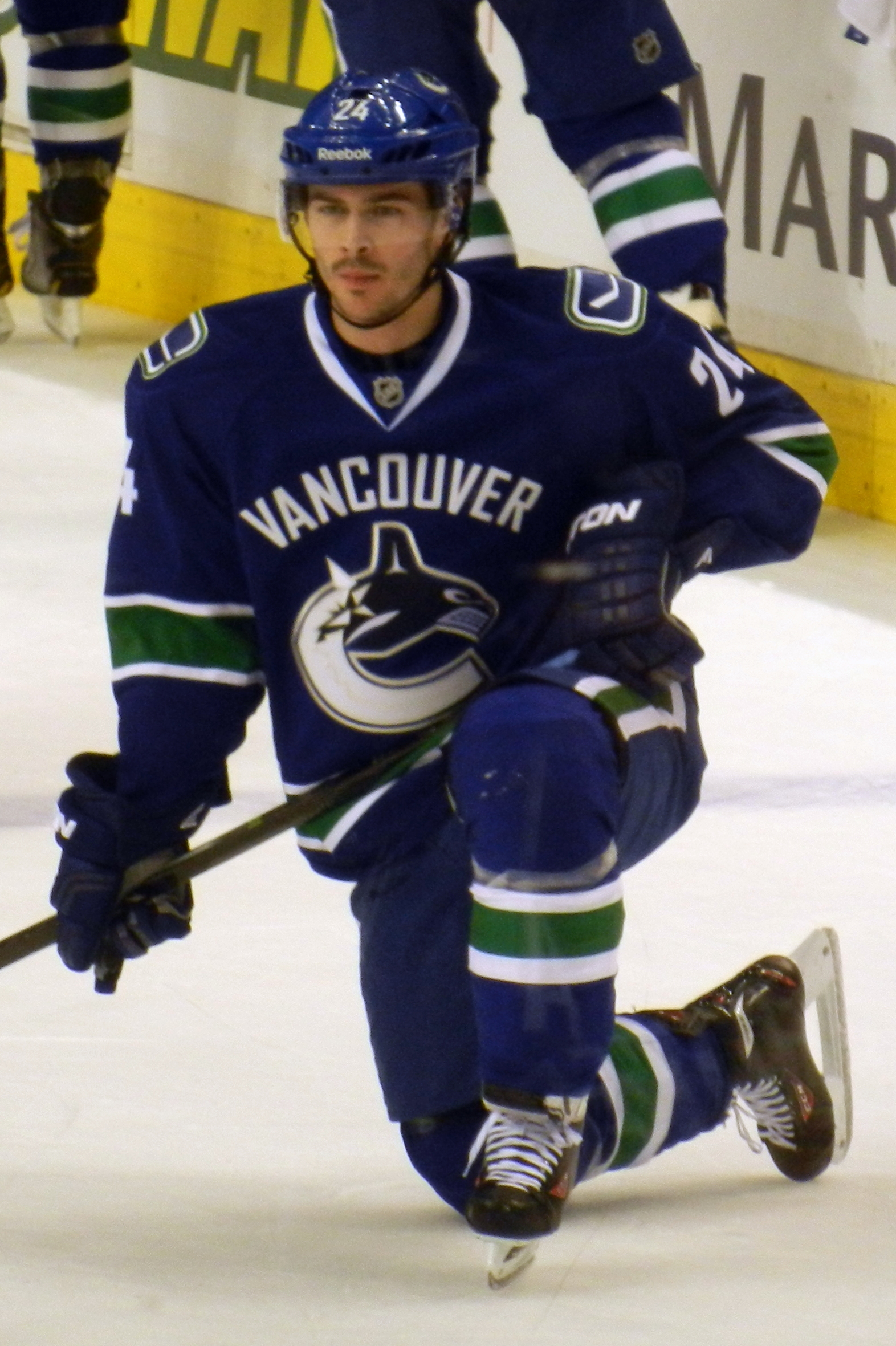
- Born: January 9, 1986 (age 40) Baar, Switzerland
- Height: 5 ft 11 in (180 cm)
- Weight: 196 lb (89 kg; 14 st 0 lb)
- Position: Defence
- Shoots: Right
- NL team Former teams: EV Zug; Montreal Canadiens; Vancouver Canucks; New York Rangers; Calgary Flames; HC Fribourg-Gottéron
- National team: Switzerland
- NHL draft: Undrafted
- Playing career: 2003–present

Raphael Salvador Diaz (born January 9, 1986) is a Swiss professional ice hockey defenceman who currently plays with EV Zug in the National League (NL). He began his professional career with EV Zug in 2003 and has also played with the Montreal Canadiens, Vancouver Canucks, New York Rangers and the Calgary Flames. After returning to Switzerland with EV Zug Diaz has won the 2019 Swiss Cup and the 2020-21 NL Championship

Diaz was selected to play for the Switzerland men's national ice hockey team at the 2010 and 2014 Winter Olympics. He previously represented Switzerland at the 2004 IIHF World U18 Championships, the 2005 and 2006 IIHF World U20 Championship, the 2008 Ice Hockey World Championship, and captained the team at the 2017 Spengler Cup.

== Playing career ==
As a youth, Diaz played in the 2000 Quebec International Pee-Wee Hockey Tournament with a team from Central Switzerland.

On May 13, 2011, Diaz signed a one-year two-way contract with the Montreal Canadiens of the NHL. He made his NHL debut October 6, 2011 against the Toronto Maple Leafs. Diaz scored his first NHL goal on October 18, 2011, against Ryan Miller of the Buffalo Sabres. He appeared as a rookie team member at the 2012 All Star game skills competition, as an injury replacement for Adam Larsson. He participated in the G Series NHL Skills Challenge Relay performing the control relay skill skating with the puck through a series of 6 cones. Diaz was traded to the Vancouver Canucks on February 3, 2014, for Dale Weise.

On March 5, 2014, Diaz was traded to the New York Rangers for a 5th-round pick in the 2015 NHL entry draft

After attending the Calgary Flames training camp on a try-out, Diaz capped a successful pre-season by signing a one-year contract with the club on October 6, 2014.

On July 1, 2015, the New York Rangers signed Diaz as a free agent to a one-year, $700,000 contract. In his return to the Rangers organization, Diaz was assigned to AHL affiliate, the Hartford Wolf Pack for the duration of the 2015–16 regular season. On December 23, 2015, Diaz was signed by the EV Zug to a five-year, CHF 5 million contract starting in the 2016–17 season.

On June 2, 2017, Diaz was named captain of EV Zug. He won his first NL title with Zug in 2021.

On January 27, 2021, Diaz was signed to a four-year deal by HC Fribourg-Gottéron, starting with the 2021–22 season and through the 2024–25 season.

== Personal life ==
Diaz's father is originally from Spain, while his mother is Swiss. His name was originally 'Rafael,' and is still used by the Swiss national team, though as his passport uses 'Raphael,' he uses that as his official name.

His sister Daniela Diaz also played hockey.

== Career statistics ==
=== Regular season and playoffs ===
			Regular season					Playoffs
Season	Team	League	GP	G	A	Pts	PIM	GP	G	A	Pts	PIM
2001–02	EV Zug	SUI U20	4	0	1	1	0	—	—	—	—	—
2002–03	EV Zug	SUI U20	30	7	10	17	32	7	1	1	2	12
2002–03	EHC Seewen–Herti	SUI.2 U20	—	—	—	—	—	—	—	—	—	—
2002–03	EHC Seewen–Herti	SUI.3	9	1	2	3	—	6	0	1	1	—
2003–04	EV Zug	SUI U20	15	6	5	11	22	—	—	—	—	—
2003–04	EV Zug	NLA	38	2	1	3	16	5	0	0	0	2
2004–05	EV Zug	SUI U20	4	1	1	2	4	—	—	—	—	—
2004–05	EV Zug	NLA	41	1	4	5	12	9	0	0	0	4
2005–06	EV Zug	SUI U20	3	0	1	1	2	—	—	—	—	—
2005–06	EV Zug	NLA	35	5	2	7	34	7	0	0	0	4
2006–07	EV Zug	NLA	44	2	4	6	22	12	0	1	1	6
2007–08	EV Zug	NLA	50	3	11	14	44	7	0	0	0	4
2008–09	EV Zug	NLA	50	4	9	13	36	10	1	1	2	4
2009–10	EV Zug	NLA	49	4	27	31	22	13	1	5	6	10
2010–11	EV Zug	NLA	45	12	27	39	26	10	2	4	6	4
2011–12	Montreal Canadiens	NHL	59	3	13	16	30	—	—	—	—	—
2012–13	EV Zug	NLA	32	7	22	29	12	—	—	—	—	—
2012–13	Montreal Canadiens	NHL	23	1	13	14	6	5	0	0	0	0
2013–14	Montreal Canadiens	NHL	46	0	11	11	12	—	—	—	—	—
2013–14	Vancouver Canucks	NHL	6	1	1	2	0	—	—	—	—	—
2013–14	New York Rangers	NHL	11	1	1	2	4	4	0	0	0	0
2014–15	Calgary Flames	NHL	56	2	2	4	10	3	0	0	0	0
2015–16	Hartford Wolfpack	AHL	37	6	15	21	16	—	—	—	—	—
2015–16	New York Rangers	NHL	—	—	—	—	—	1	0	1	1	0
2016–17	EV Zug	NLA	46	8	22	30	28	16	5	9	14	6
2017–18	EV Zug	NL	48	5	25	30	26	4	1	2	3	4
2018–19	EV Zug	NL	43	12	19	31	10	14	1	5	6	14
2019–20	EV Zug	NL	47	10	21	31	51	—	—	—	—	—
2020–21	EV Zug	NL	44	10	17	27	24	11	0	6	6	4
2021–22	HC Fribourg–Gottéron	NL	37	5	14	19	22	9	0	2	2	6
2022–23	HC Fribourg–Gottéron	NL	50	7	18	25	26	2	0	0	0	0
2023–24	HC Fribourg–Gottéron	NL	49	0	13	13	32	10	1	2	3	0
2024–25	HC Fribourg–Gottéron	NL	52	3	6	9	22	14	0	1	1	4
2025–26	EV Zug	NL	13	1	6	7	6	7	0	1	1	6
NL totals			813	101	268	369	471	160	12	39	51	82
NHL totals			201	8	41	49	62	13	0	1	1	0

=== International ===
Medal record

Ice hockey

Representing Switzerland

World Championships
Silver medal – second place	2013 Sweden/Finland	
Silver medal – second place	2018 Denmark	

Year	Team	Event	Result	GP	G	A	Pts	PIM
2004	Switzerland	WJC D1	11th	5	1	3	4	4
2005	Switzerland	WJC	8th	6	1	1	2	8
2006	Switzerland	WJC	8th	6	0	1	1	6
2008	Switzerland	WC	7th	7	0	0	0	0
2010	Switzerland	OG	8th	5	0	0	0	4
2011	Switzerland	WC	9th	6	3	1	4	4
2013	Switzerland	WC	2nd place, silver medalist(s)	4	0	1	1	0
2014	Switzerland	OG	9th	4	0	0	0	4
2016	Switzerland	WC	11th	5	0	6	6	2
2017	Switzerland	WC	6th	8	0	1	1	6
2018	Switzerland	OG	10th	3	0	0	0	0
2018	Switzerland	WC	2nd place, silver medalist(s)	10	1	5	6	8
2019	Switzerland	WC	8th	8	0	2	2	2
2021	Switzerland	WC	6th	8	1	2	3	2
2022	Switzerland	OG	8th	5	1	1	2	2
Junior totals				17	2	5	7	18
Senior totals				73	6	19	25	34
