= Kevin Fiala =

Swiss ice hockey player (born 1996)

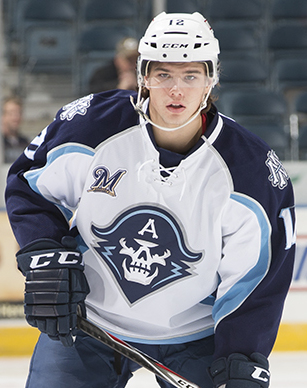
- Fiala with the Milwaukee Admirals in 2015
- Born: 22 July 1996 (age 30) St. Gallen, Switzerland
- Height: 6 ft 0 in (183 cm)
- Weight: 205 lb (93 kg; 14 st 9 lb)
- Position: Left wing
- Shoots: Left
- NHL team Former teams: Los Angeles Kings; HV71; Nashville Predators; Minnesota Wild
- National team: Switzerland
- NHL draft: 11th overall, 2014; Nashville Predators
- Playing career: 2013–present

Kevin Fiala (born 22 July 1996) is a Swiss professional ice hockey player who is a left winger for the Los Angeles Kings of the National Hockey League (NHL). He spent one season with the Malmö Redhawks junior team, then joined HV71, splitting a season between their junior team and their senior team in the Swedish Hockey League (SHL). He was selected by the Nashville Predators 11th overall in the 2014 NHL entry draft. Fiala started the following season with HV71 before moving to North America halfway through, splitting two seasons between the Predators and their American Hockey League (AHL) affiliate, the Milwaukee Admirals.

Internationally Fiala has played for the Swiss national team at several tournaments, both at the junior and senior level, and has appeared in two World Championships.

== Playing career ==
Fiala played in the 2009 Quebec International Pee-Wee Hockey Tournament with the Swiss Eastern team. He later played in various junior leagues in his native Switzerland prior to joining the Swedish club Malmö Redhawks for the 2012–13 season. His time was split between the U18 club in the J18 Elit and J18 Allsvenskan, and the U20 outfit in the J20 SuperElit. Fiala then joined HV71, with whom he debuted for during the 2013 European Trophy. Throughout the 2013–14 season, Fiala split time with the HV71 junior team in the J20 SuperElit and the senior team, who played in the Swedish Hockey League (SHL). He was praised by Head Coach Ulf Dahlén for his play following his SHL debut, a 5–4 defeat to Linköpings HC. Fiala was a finalist for the SHL's Rookie of the Year award; he finished tying for the lead among all SHL junior (under-18) players for points, with 11. Prior to joining the senior team in the SHL, Fiala had been one of the top scorers in the junior league, with 10 goals and 25 points in 27 games.

Fiala was ranked as one of the top European prospects for the 2014 NHL entry draft, being considered a top-three player by many scouting services; he ultimately was selected by the Nashville Predators 11th overall. The Predators signed him to a three-year, entry-level contract on 15 July 2014.

Fiala initially started the 2014–15 season with HV71. However, in January he was reassigned to the Milwaukee Admirals, the Predators American Hockey League (AHL) affiliate. At the time, Fiala had 14 points in 20 games, which was the sixth-most points of all junior players in the SHL. He made his NHL debut during the season, on March 24, against the Montreal Canadiens. He also appeared in one playoff game during the season.

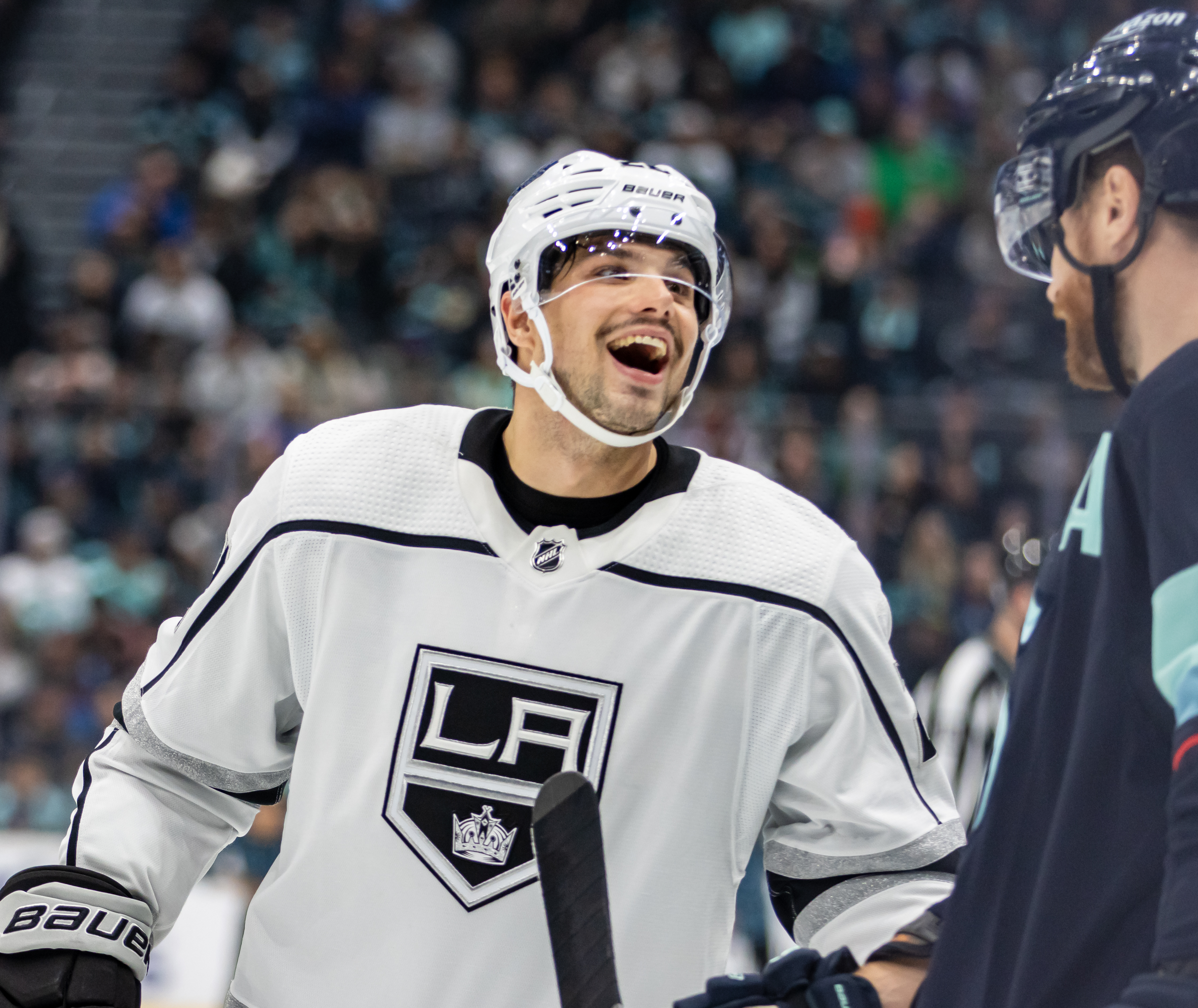
Fiala with the Los Angeles Kings in 2023.

He scored his first NHL goal on 14 January 2016, against Connor Hellebuyck of the Winnipeg Jets. Spending most of the season with Milwaukee, he finished the year with 50 points in 66 games.

In the 2016–17 season, Fiala made the Predators opening night roster. In his rookie NHL season, Fiala appeared in 54 games and scored 11 goals. He was assigned to the Admirals throughout the year and recorded 19 points in 22 games. In the post-season, after a first round sweep of the Chicago Blackhawks, in which he collected two goals (including the overtime game winner in Game 3), Fiala suffered a broken left femur on 26 April 2017, playing in the opening game of the second round of the Stanley Cup playoffs. In the second period of the game against the St. Louis Blues, Fiala's left knee collided with the end boards after being checked by St. Louis Blues defenseman Robert Bortuzzo. Fiala was removed from the ice on a stretcher to a waiting ambulance and transported to Barnes-Jewish Hospital in St. Louis. Fiala fractured his left femur thus ending his 2017 playoff participation.

During the 2018–19 season, having tallied 10 goals and 32 points in 64 games with the Predators, Fiala was traded at the trade deadline to the Minnesota Wild in exchange for Mikael Granlund on 25 February 2019. On 11 September 2019, Fiala signed a two-year extension with the Wild.

On 16 August 2021, Fiala agreed to a one-year, $5.1 million contract with the Wild.

On 29 June 2022, Fiala as an impending restricted free agent was traded by the Wild to the Los Angeles Kings in exchange for defenseman Brock Faber and a first-round pick in 2022. After the trade, Fiala was immediately signed to a seven-year $55.125 million contract extension with the Kings.

On 5 January, Fiala was named to the 2023 NHL All Star Game, his first selection in his career. Although he saw a slight decrease in his point production, Fiala led the team in assists with 49, while teammate Adrian Kempe led in goals.

On 14 February 2026, it was announced that Fiala would miss the remainder of the 2025–26 NHL season after having surgery to fix an injury he suffered during the 2026 Winter Olympics.

== International play ==
Medal record

Representing Switzerland

Ice hockey

World Championships
Silver medal – second place	2018 Denmark	
Silver medal – second place	2024 Czechia	
Silver medal – second place	2025 Sweden/Denmark	

Fiala played in the Ivan Hlinka Memorial Tournament in 2012 and 2013 as a member of the Swiss U18 national team. He also skated for his country at the 2014 World Junior Ice Hockey Championships, where he was lauded as one of the key players on the Swiss roster. In five WJC games, he recorded one goal and four assists, as Switzerland was eliminated by Canada in the quarter-finals. In May 2014, Fiala represented Switzerland at the 2014 IIHF World Championship in Belarus, registering two assists in seven games. Fiala was the third player in history to play in the under-18, World Junior, and World Championship in the same year (the first two were Andrei Kostitsyn and Vadim Karaga, both with Belarus in 2003).

Fiala also participated at the 2018 IIHF World Championship, where the Swiss won silver. In the final against Sweden Fiala had a chance to clinch the gold in overtime but his shot went too low. After losing the shootout the Swiss had to settle for silver. He represented Switzerland at the 2024 IIHF World Championship and won a silver medal.

On 15 June 2025, Fiala was selected for the Swiss 2026 Winter Olympics ice hockey team.

In 2026, during the third period of Team Switzerland's game against Team Canada on 13 February, Fiala and Canada's Tom Wilson collided near the boards. Fiala fell to the ice, was unable to skate off under his own power, and was stretchered off. On 14 February, it was announced Fiala had undergone surgery and would miss the remainder of the Olympics.

== Personal life ==
Fiala is a native of St. Gallen, Switzerland, although both his parents are Czech. His father, Jan, played professional hockey in the Swiss lower leagues. After retiring Jan turned to coaching, and was one of Fiala's first coaches. Fiala is a polyglot who speaks five languages: Czech, English, French, German, and Swedish.

== Career statistics ==
=== Regular season and playoffs ===
			Regular season					Playoffs
Season	Team	League	GP	G	A	Pts	PIM	GP	G	A	Pts	PIM
2010–11	ZSC Lions	SUI U17	25	10	10	20	14	7	0	2	2	0
2011–12	ZSC Lions	SUI U17	28	34	18	52	98	8	6	8	14	24
2011–12	ZSC Lions	SUI.2 U20	7	1	4	5	8	4	3	2	5	18
2011–12	GCK Lions	SUI U20	2	0	1	1	0	—	—	—	—	—
2012–13	Malmö Redhawks	J18	1	1	0	1	0	—	—	—	—	—
2012–13	Malmö Redhawks	J18 Allsv	8	5	4	9	28	4	4	3	7	4
2012–13	Malmö Redhawks	J20	33	9	19	28	28	3	0	0	0	2
2013–14	HV71	J20	27	10	15	25	40	—	—	—	—	—
2013–14	HV71	SHL	17	3	8	11	10	8	1	5	6	14
2014–15	HV71	SHL	20	5	9	14	14	—	—	—	—	—
2014–15	Milwaukee Admirals	AHL	33	11	9	20	18	—	—	—	—	—
2014–15	Nashville Predators	NHL	1	0	0	0	0	1	0	0	0	0
2015–16	Milwaukee Admirals	AHL	66	18	32	50	78	3	0	0	0	2
2015–16	Nashville Predators	NHL	5	1	0	1	0	—	—	—	—	—
2016–17	Nashville Predators	NHL	54	11	5	16	18	5	2	0	2	0
2016–17	Milwaukee Admirals	AHL	22	7	12	19	45	—	—	—	—	—
2017–18	Nashville Predators	NHL	80	23	25	48	26	12	3	1	4	8
2018–19	Nashville Predators	NHL	64	10	22	32	26	—	—	—	—	—
2018–19	Minnesota Wild	NHL	19	3	4	7	10	—	—	—	—	—
2019–20	Minnesota Wild	NHL	64	23	31	54	42	4	3	1	4	10
2020–21	Minnesota Wild	NHL	50	20	20	40	43	7	1	1	2	2
2021–22	Minnesota Wild	NHL	82	33	52	85	52	6	0	3	3	16
2022–23	Los Angeles Kings	NHL	69	23	49	72	52	3	1	5	6	4
2023–24	Los Angeles Kings	NHL	82	29	44	73	62	5	1	1	2	4
2024–25	Los Angeles Kings	NHL	81	35	25	60	38	6	3	4	7	2
2025–26	Los Angeles Kings	NHL	56	18	22	40	34	—	—	—	—	—
SHL totals			37	8	17	25	24	8	1	5	6	14
NHL totals			707	229	299	528	403	49	14	16	30	46

=== International ===
Year	Team	Event	Result	GP	G	A	Pts	PIM
2012	Switzerland	IH18	6th	4	3	0	3	2
2013	Switzerland	IH18	6th	4	2	0	2	12
2014	Switzerland	WJC	7th	5	1	4	5	6
2014	Switzerland	WJC18	7th	5	4	5	9	8
2014	Switzerland	WC	10th	7	0	2	2	2
2015	Switzerland	WJC	9th	6	4	1	5	16
2015	Switzerland	WC	8th	8	1	2	3	6
2018	Switzerland	WC	2nd place, silver medalist(s)	5	1	4	5	6
2019	Switzerland	WC	8th	8	4	3	7	2
2023	Switzerland	WC	5th	6	1	5	6	4
2024	Switzerland	WC	2nd place, silver medalist(s)	8	7	6	13	27
2025	Switzerland	WC	2nd place, silver medalist(s)	8	3	7	10	8
2026	Switzerland	OG	5th	2	0	1	1	0
Junior totals				24	14	10	24	44
Senior totals				52	17	30	47	55

== Awards and honours ==
Award	Year
NHL
NHL All-Star Game	2023
International
IIHF World Championship MVP	2024
IIHF World Championship Best Forward	2024
IIHF World Championship All-Star Team	2024

Awards and achievements
Preceded by Seth Jones	Nashville Predators first-round draft pick 2014	Succeeded by Dante Fabbro
