= Ramon Untersander =

Swiss ice hockey player

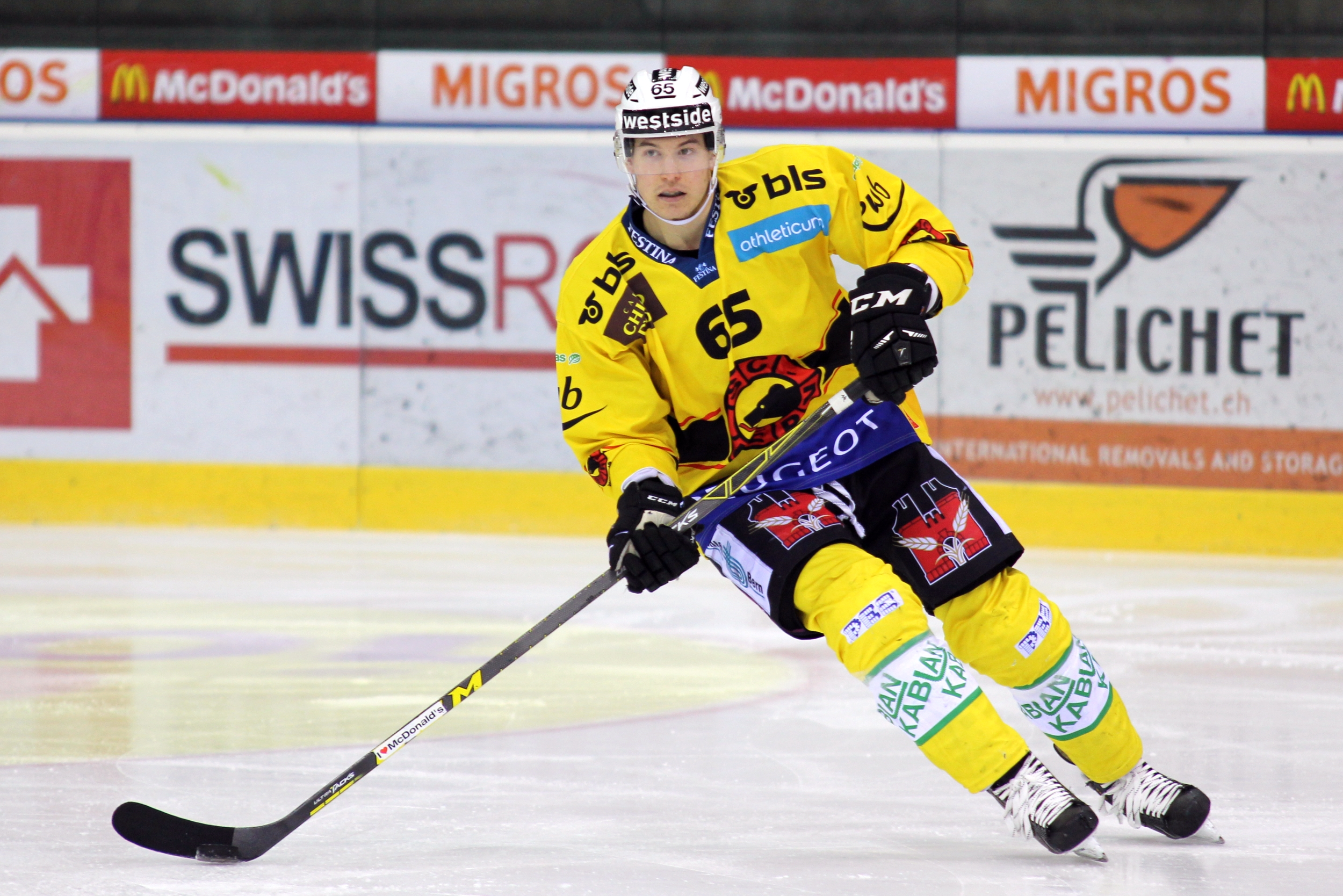
- Untersander in 2016
- Born: January 21, 1991 (age 34); Alt St. Johann, Switzerland
- Height: 6 ft 0 in (183 cm)
- Weight: 198 lb (90 kg; 14 st 2 lb)
- Position: Defence
- Shoots: Right
- NL team Former teams: SC Bern; HC Davos; EHC Biel
- National team: Switzerland
- Playing career: 2009–present

Ramon Untersander (born January 21, 1991) is a Swiss professional ice hockey defenseman currently playing for SC Bern of the National League (NL).

He participated for the Swiss national team at the 2017 IIHF World Championship and at the 2018 IIHF World Championship winning a silver medal.

== Career statistics ==
=== Regular season and playoffs ===
			Regular season					Playoffs
Season	Team	League	GP	G	A	Pts	PIM	GP	G	A	Pts	PIM
2006–07	HC Davos	Elite Jr. A	3	0	0	0	4	1	0	0	0	0
2007–08	HC Davos	Elite Jr. A	37	3	6	9	44	5	1	0	1	0
2008–09	HC Davos	Elite Jr. A	36	5	9	14	22	13	1	2	3	4
2009–10	HC Davos	NLA	35	0	0	0	18	2	0	0	0	0
2009–10	HC Davos	Elite Jr. A	—	—	—	—	—	3	2	1	3	2
2010–11	HC Davos	NLA	29	0	1	1	8	9	0	0	0	0
2010–11	HC Davos	Elite Jr. A	1	0	1	1	0	1	0	0	0	0
2011–12	HC Davos	NLA	46	2	1	3	8	4	1	0	1	0
2011–12	EHC Biel	NLA	5	0	0	0	2	—	—	—	—	—
2012–13	EHC Biel	NLA	29	0	1	1	10	7	0	0	0	6
2013–14	EHC Biel	NLA	32	0	3	3	8	—	—	—	—	—
2014–15	EHC Biel	NLA	42	3	14	17	8	7	0	0	0	0
2015–16	SC Bern	NLA	31	6	13	19	16	14	3	9	12	4
2016–17	SC Bern	NLA	50	12	18	30	39	16	5	6	11	2
2017–18	SC Bern	NL	49	4	25	29	20	11	3	8	11	2
2018–19	SC Bern	NL	6	2	2	4	2	16	3	6	9	4
2019–20	SC Bern	NL	50	9	19	28	20	—	—	—	—	—
2020–21	SC Bern	NL	39	4	8	12	10	9	4	3	7	2
2021–22	SC Bern	NL	42	9	21	30	18	—	—	—	—	—
NL totals			485	51	126	177	187	95	19	32	51	20

=== International ===
Medal record

Representing Switzerland

Ice hockey

World Championships
Silver medal – second place	2018 Denmark	

Year	Team	Event	Result	GP	G	A	Pts	PIM
2010	Switzerland	WJC	4th	7	0	0	0	2
2011	Switzerland	WJC	5th	6	0	0	0	0
2017	Switzerland	WC	6th	6	0	5	5	0
2018	Switzerland	OG	10th	4	0	1	1	0
2018	Switzerland	WC	2nd place, silver medalist(s)	10	3	4	7	0
2021	Switzerland	WC	6th	7	1	1	2	4
2022	Switzerland	OG	8th	3	0	2	2	0
Junior totals				13	0	0	0	2
Senior totals				30	4	13	17	4

== Awards and honours ==
Award	Year
NL
Champion (HC Davos)	2011
Champion (SC Bern)	2016, 2017, 2019
