= Enzo Corvi =

Swiss ice hockey player (born 1992)

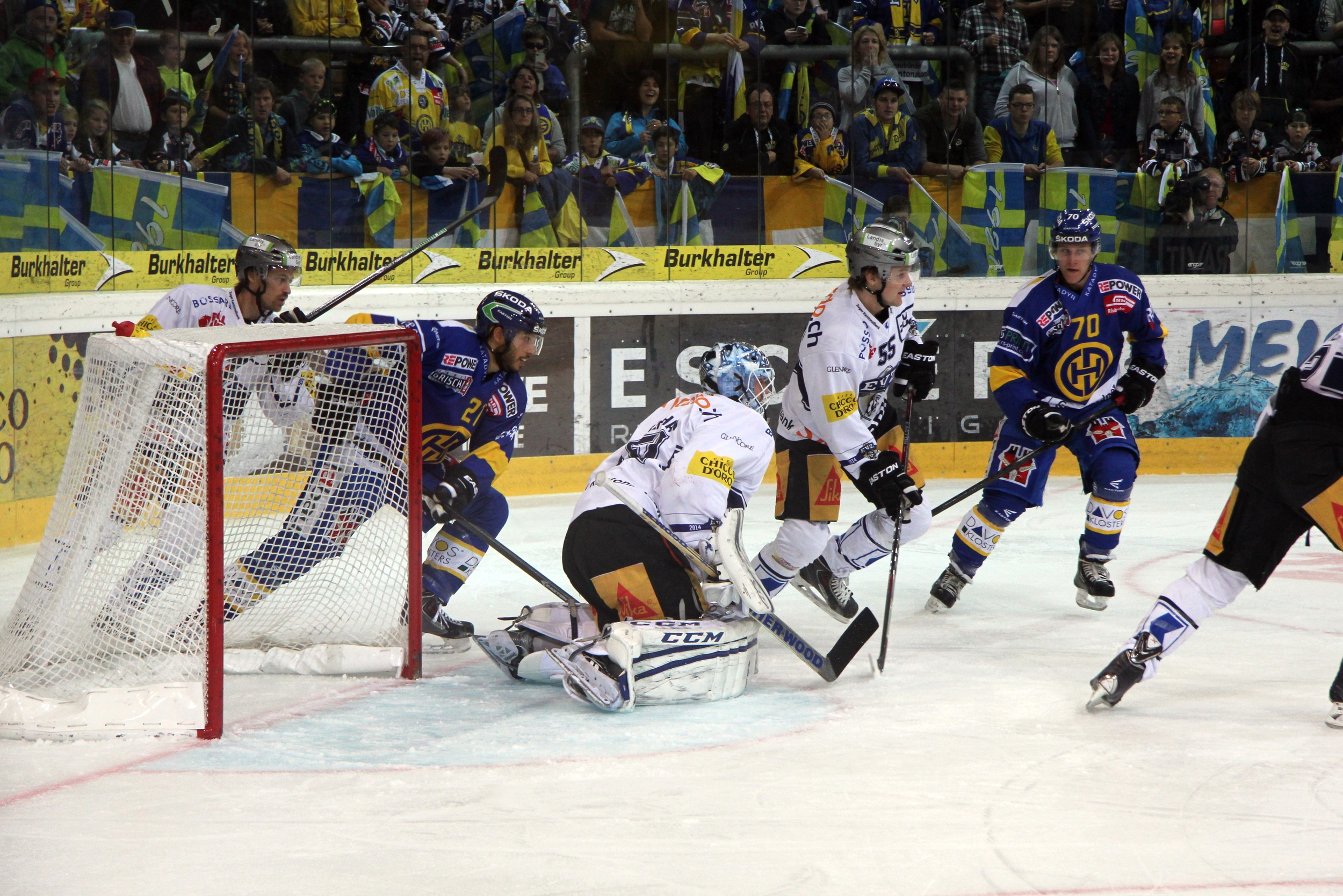
- Corvi in 2014
- Born: 23 December 1992 (age 32) Chur, Switzerland
- Height: 6 ft 0 in (183 cm)
- Weight: 190 lb (86 kg; 13 st 8 lb)
- Position: Center
- Shoots: Right
- NL team: HC Davos
- National team: Switzerland
- Playing career: 2008–present

Enzo Corvi (born 23 December 1992) is a Swiss professional ice hockey center who currently plays for HC Davos of the National League (NL).

== Playing career ==
Corvi made his professional debut in the lower Swiss leagues with his hometown club, EHC Chur. On 1 May 2012 Corvi left Chur to sign with NLA stalwart club, HC Davos.

With Davos, Corvi played at the 2012 Spengler Cup, where they lost the final match against Team Canada 7-2. In the tournament, he scored his first goal for Davos against Adler Mannheim. Corvi played alongside Joe Thornton, who played due to the 2012 Lockout with Davos. Selected for the 2018 IIHF World Championship with Switzerland men's team he won a silver medal.

On 18 December 2018 Corvi agreed to a four-year contract extension with HC Davos worth CHF 2.4 million.

On 5 August 2021 Corvi agreed to an early four-year contract extension with HC Davos through the 2025/26 season.

== Career statistics ==
=== Regular season and playoffs ===
			Regular season					Playoffs
Season	Team	League	GP	G	A	Pts	PIM	GP	G	A	Pts	PIM
2008–09	EHC Chur	SUI U17	22	37	32	69	72	—	—	—	—	—
2008–09	EHC Chur	SUI.2 U20	35	9	12	21	54	—	—	—	—	—
2008–09	EHC Chur	SUI.3	7	0	0	0	0	—	—	—	—	—
2009–10	EHC Chur	SUI.2 U20	34	20	24	44	130	—	—	—	—	—
2009–10	EHC Chur	SUI.4	17	10	17	27	44	9	3	6	9	14
2010–11	EHC Chur	SUI.2 U20	23	27	28	55	32	2	0	3	3	4
2010–11	EHC Chur	SUI.4	13	8	21	29	10	9	10	12	22	31
2011–12	EHC Chur	SUI.2 U20	16	19	22	41	28	7	6	6	12	18
2011–12	EHC Chur	SUI.3	27	11	8	19	24	3	1	0	1	6
2012–13	HC Davos	NLA	31	0	1	1	6	3	0	0	0	2
2012–13	HC Thurgau	SUI.2	8	3	8	11	8	—	—	—	—	—
2013–14	HC Davos	NLA	48	7	10	17	14	6	0	2	2	2
2014–15	HC Davos	NLA	40	9	13	22	14	15	1	3	4	6
2015–16	HC Davos	NLA	23	3	8	11	12	5	1	1	2	0
2016–17	HC Davos	NLA	47	14	25	39	12	10	4	5	9	10
2017–18	HC Davos	NL	45	18	15	33	32	6	1	1	2	10
2018–19	HC Davos	NL	33	9	7	16	6	—	—	—	—	—
2019–20	HC Davos	NL	39	5	26	31	26	—	—	—	—	—
2020–21	HC Davos	NL	44	15	37	52	16	3	0	1	1	2
2021–22	HC Davos	NL	45	7	25	32	23	11	2	6	8	2
NL totals			395	87	167	254	161	59	9	19	28	34

=== International ===
Medal record

Representing Switzerland

Ice hockey

World Championships
Silver medal – second place	2018 Denmark	

Year	Team	Event	Result	GP	G	A	Pts	PIM
2018	Switzerland	OG	10th	4	1	0	1	4
2018	Switzerland	WC	2nd place, silver medalist(s)	10	4	5	9	6
2021	Switzerland	WC	6th	8	0	5	5	0
2022	Switzerland	OG	8th	5	1	4	5	0
2022	Switzerland	WC	5th	8	0	7	7	2
Senior totals				35	6	21	27	12
