= Anders Nilsson (ice hockey) =

Swedish ice hockey player (born 1990)

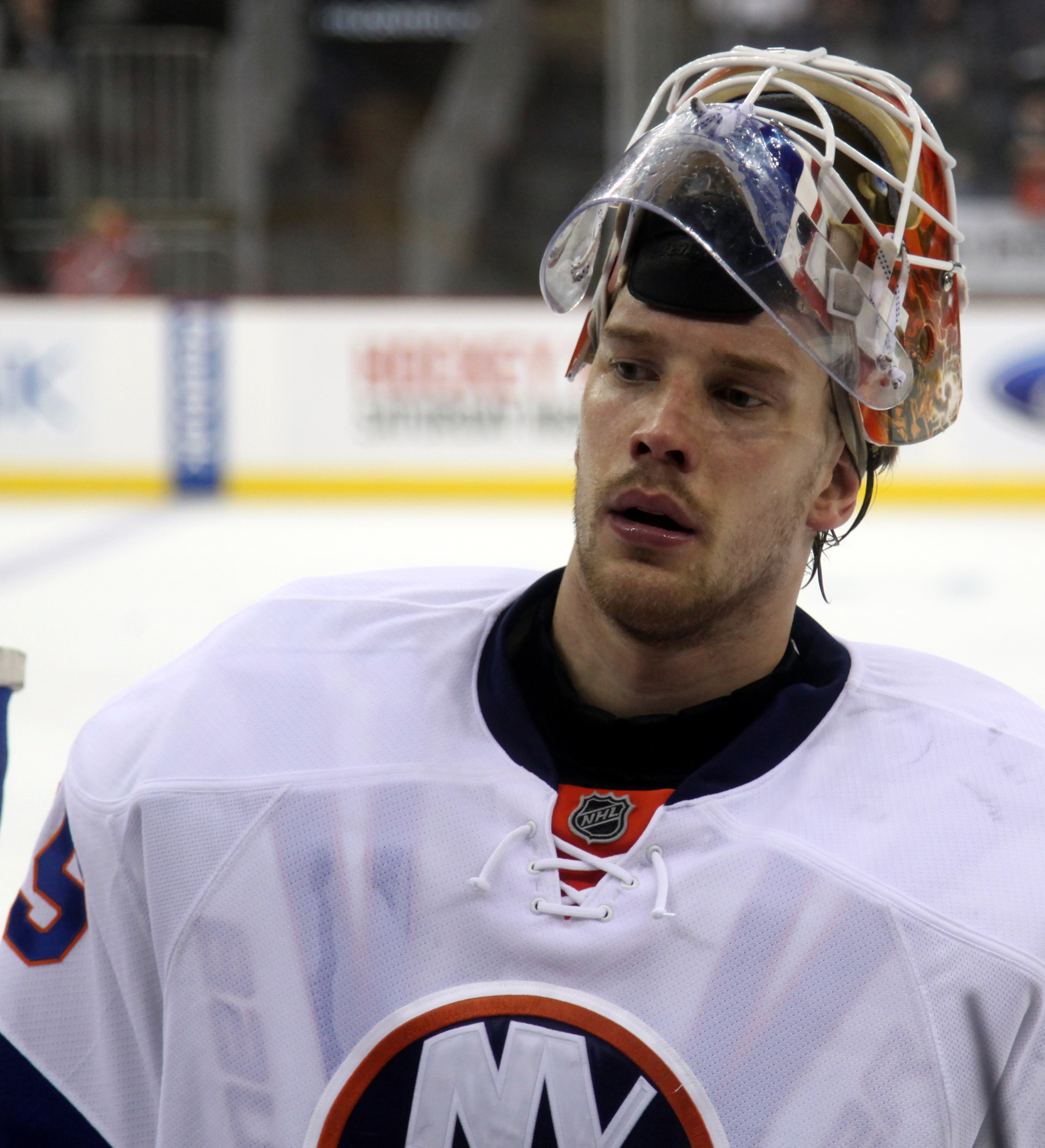
- Nilsson with the New York Islanders in 2014
- Born: 19 March 1990 (age 36) Luleå, Sweden
- Height: 6 ft 6 in (198 cm)
- Weight: 232 lb (105 kg; 16 st 8 lb)
- Position: Goaltender
- Caught: Left
- Played for: Luleå HF; New York Islanders; Ak Bars Kazan; Edmonton Oilers; St. Louis Blues; Buffalo Sabres; Vancouver Canucks; Ottawa Senators
- National team: Sweden
- NHL draft: 62nd overall, 2009; New York Islanders
- Playing career: 2009–2021

Bengt Per Anders Nilsson (born 19 March 1990) is a Swedish former professional ice hockey goaltender. Nilsson was drafted 62nd overall in the 2009 NHL entry draft by the New York Islanders and played in the NHL with the Islanders, Edmonton Oilers, St. Louis Blues, Buffalo Sabres, Vancouver Canucks, and Ottawa Senators. Internationally, Nilsson led Sweden to a gold medal at the 2018 World Championships.

== Playing career ==
On 27 April 2011, the New York Islanders signed Nilsson to a three-year entry-level contract. He was initially assigned to the Islanders American Hockey League (AHL) affiliate, the Bridgeport Sound Tigers. Nilsson was recalled by the Islanders after Evgeni Nabokov was injured in a game against the Montreal Canadiens. He made his NHL debut on 19 November 2011, against the Boston Bruins, in relief of Rick DiPietro. He let in 3 goals on 17 shots, while playing 40 minutes, as the Islanders lost 6–0. He got his first start in the NHL on 21 November 2011, against the Pittsburgh Penguins at Consol Energy Center in Pittsburgh, Pennsylvania. On 4 March 2012, he earned his first NHL victory and shutout in a 1–0 home win against the New Jersey Devils. In doing so, he became the first goalie in Islanders history to record a shutout for his first win. In his next start, on 10 March 2012, he almost shutout the Devils a second time, but the Devils scored two goals in the last two minutes of the game, resulting in a 2–1 loss for the Islanders.

Nilsson saw limited action with the Sound Tigers in 2012–13, as he was diagnosed with an unknown, fatigue-inducing illness in January 2013. The illness was later determined to be a vitamin B12 deficiency. At the end of the season, Nilsson joined the Islanders for the playoffs but did not play. During the 2013–14 season, Nilsson was again assigned to the Bridgeport Sound Tigers. He was recalled on 18 November 2013 and played in five games with the Islanders, going 0–2–2 before being sent back to Bridgeport. Nilsson joined the Islanders again on 1 March 2014 after sending Kevin Poulin to Bridgeport. He finished the season playing in 19 games for the Islanders compiling a record of 8–7–2.

On 26 May 2014, as a restricted free agent, Nilsson decided to sign a contract with Russian club Ak Bars Kazan of the Kontinental Hockey League. Ak Bars issued a release confirming the signing. On 4 October 2014, Nilsson's NHL rights were traded by the Islanders to the Chicago Blackhawks in a trade for Nick Leddy. Nilsson appeared in 38 regular season games for Ak Bars, registering a 20–9–8 record and 20 playoff games, ending with a 13–7 record.

On 6 July 2015, Nilsson's NHL rights were traded for a second time, from the Blackhawks to the Edmonton Oilers in exchange for prospect Liam Coughlin. He in turn agreed to a one-year, one-way contract with the Oilers. Nilsson earned a spot on the Oilers roster after a stellar training camp, not allowing a single goal in the preseason. In the 2015–16 season, Nilsson appeared in a career high 26 games with the Oilers, sharing the pipes with Cam Talbot, before he was traded approaching the trade deadline by the Oilers to the St. Louis Blues in exchange for Niklas Lundström and the Blues' fifth-round selection in the 2016 NHL entry draft on 27 February 2016.

On 2 July 2016, Nilsson as a restricted free agent was traded from the Blues to the Buffalo Sabres in exchange for a 2017 fifth round draft pick. During the 2016–17 season, in December 2016, Nilsson began wearing a mask with a gay pride flag painted on the back as a sign that ice hockey welcomes diversity. He drew praise from Wade Davis, executive director of the You Can Play campaign, who said that Nilsson "is taking a risk on multiple fronts and is standing up for something that he believes in, knowing the backlash that could come his way."

After a successful tenure with the Sabres, serving as backup to Robin Lehner, Nilsson left as a free agent in signing a two-year, $5 million contract with the Vancouver Canucks on 1 July 2017. He was the Canucks' backup goalie until Thatcher Demko was deemed ready to play in the NHL by Vancouver's management. During the 2018–19 season, on 2 January 2019, he was traded by the Canucks along with Darren Archibald to the Ottawa Senators in exchange for Mike McKenna, Tom Pyatt and a sixth-round draft pick in 2019. He was acquired by the Senators following injuries to goaltenders Mike Condon and Craig Anderson. In 22 starts for the Senators, Nilsson went 11–11–0. On 29 May 2019, the Senators re-signed Nilsson to a two-year, $5.2 million contract extension with an annual average of $2.6 million. On 16 December 2019, Nilsson was placed on injured reserve due to a concussion. He missed the rest of the season.

With a year remaining on his contract, approaching the delayed 2020–21 season, Nilsson was traded by the Senators along with the contract of Marián Gáborík to the Tampa Bay Lightning in exchange for Braydon Coburn, Cédric Paquette and a 2022 second-round pick on 27 December 2020. However, Nilsson ultimately never played a game for Tampa Bay, and, after missing the entire 2020–21 season with post-concussion symptoms and neck problems, announced his retirement on 8 August 2021.

== International play ==
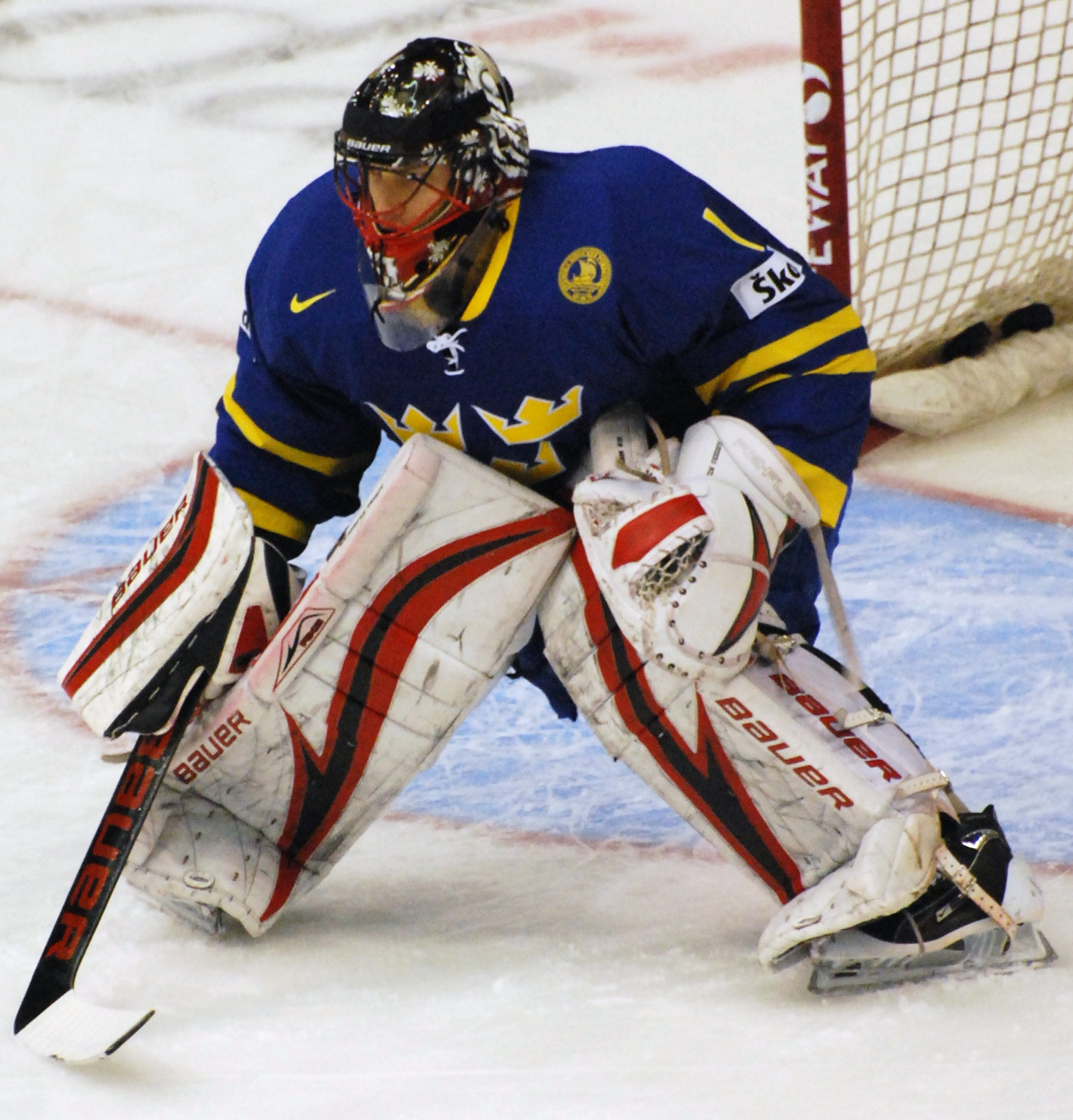
- Nilsson with Team Sweden

Medal record

Representing Sweden

Ice hockey

World Championships
| Bronze medal – third place | 2014 Belarus | |
| Gold medal – first place | 2018 Denmark | |

World Junior Championships
| Bronze medal – third place | 2010 Canada | |

Nilsson represented Sweden at the 2010 World Junior Ice Hockey Championships which were held in Saskatchewan, Canada. He only played in one game during the tournament, as Jacob Markström was the starter. Sweden won a bronze medal at the tournament. He won a gold medal with Team Sweden at the 2018 IIHF World Championship.

== Personal life ==
Nilsson is married to Emelie Nevanperä and they have one child together. Nilsson has another son from a previous relationship with Fernanda Nilsson. Nevanperä also has a child from a previous relationship. On 8 November 2017, Nilsson announced the birth of his son and second child.

Nilsson is an open supporter of the LGBTQ+ community. While with the Buffalo Sabres, he became the first NHL goaltender to put a rainbow flag on his mask.

== Career statistics ==
=== Regular season and playoffs ===
| | | | Regular season | | | | | | | | | Playoffs |
| Season | Team | League | GP | W | L | OTL | MIN | GA | SO | GAA | SV% | GP | W | L | MIN | GA | SO | GAA | SV% |
|---|---|---|---|---|---|---|---|---|---|---|---|---|---|---|---|---|---|---|---|
| 2004–05 | Luleå HF | J20 | 1 | — | — | — | 24 | 4 | 0 | 9.90 | .692 | — | — | — | — | — | — | — | — |
| 2005–06 | Luleå HF | J18 | — | — | — | — | — | — | — | — | — | — | — | — | — | — | — | — | — |
| 2005–06 | Luleå HF | J20 | — | — | — | — | — | — | — | — | — | — | — | — | — | — | — | — | — |
| 2006–07 | Luleå HF | J18 | — | — | — | — | — | — | — | — | — | — | — | — | — | — | — | — | — |
| 2006–07 | Luleå HF | J20 | — | — | — | — | — | — | — | — | — | — | — | — | — | — | — | — | — |
| 2007–08 | Luleå HF | J18 | 5 | — | — | — | — | — | — | 2.68 | .888 | — | — | — | — | — | — | — | — |
| 2007–08 | Luleå HF | J18-2 | 6 | — | — | — | — | — | — | 3.36 | .897 | — | — | — | — | — | — | — | — |
| 2007–08 | Luleå HF | J20 | 16 | — | — | — | 898 | 31 | 2 | 2.07 | .926 | 1 | 0 | 1 | 60 | 6 | 0 | 6.00 | .786 |
| 2008–09 | Luleå HF | J20 | 37 | — | — | — | 2199 | 75 | 0 | 2.05 | .927 | 6 | — | — | 357 | 14 | 1 | 2.35 | .935 |
| 2008–09 | Luleå HF | SEL | 1 | 0 | 0 | 0 | 28 | 0 | 0 | 0.00 | 1.00 | — | — | — | — | — | — | — | — |
| 2008–09 | Kalix HC | Div.1 | 1 | — | — | — | 59 | 3 | 0 | 3.05 | .930 | — | — | — | — | — | — | — | — |
| 2009–10 | Luleå HF | J20 | 4 | — | — | — | 244 | 12 | 0 | 2.95 | .899 | — | — | — | — | — | — | — | — |
| 2009–10 | Luleå HF | SEL | 27 | 10 | 12 | 2 | 1383 | 61 | 2 | 2.65 | .897 | — | — | — | — | — | — | — | — |
| 2010–11 | Luleå HF | SEL | 31 | 18 | 13 | 0 | 1876 | 60 | 6 | 1.92 | .918 | 13 | 6 | 7 | 827 | 27 | 0 | 1.96 | .931 |
| 2011–12 | New York Islanders | NHL | 4 | 1 | 2 | 0 | 218 | 10 | 1 | 2.75 | .911 | — | — | — | — | — | — | — | — |
| 2011–12 | Bridgeport Sound Tigers | AHL | 25 | 15 | 8 | 2 | 1441 | 58 | 1 | 2.41 | .921 | — | — | — | — | — | — | — | — |
| 2012–13 | Bridgeport Sound Tigers | AHL | 21 | 8 | 11 | 0 | 1208 | 60 | 1 | 2.98 | .899 | — | — | — | — | — | — | — | — |
| 2013–14 | New York Islanders | NHL | 19 | 8 | 7 | 2 | 1101 | 57 | 0 | 3.11 | .896 | — | — | — | — | — | — | — | — |
| 2013–14 | Bridgeport Sound Tigers | AHL | 29 | 12 | 14 | 2 | 1683 | 79 | 2 | 2.81 | .901 | — | — | — | — | — | — | — | — |
| 2014–15 | Ak Bars Kazan | KHL | 38 | 20 | 9 | 8 | 2247 | 64 | 5 | 1.71 | .936 | 20 | 13 | 7 | 1206 | 31 | 6 | 1.54 | .935 |
| 2015–16 | Edmonton Oilers | NHL | 26 | 10 | 12 | 2 | 1403 | 74 | 0 | 3.14 | .901 | — | — | — | — | — | — | — | — |
| 2015–16 | Bakersfield Condors | AHL | 2 | 2 | 0 | 0 | 120 | 4 | 0 | 2.01 | .935 | — | — | — | — | — | — | — | — |
| 2015–16 | St. Louis Blues | NHL | 3 | 0 | 1 | 0 | 88 | 4 | 0 | 2.75 | .909 | — | — | — | — | — | — | — | — |
| 2016–17 | Buffalo Sabres | NHL | 26 | 10 | 10 | 4 | 1485 | 66 | 1 | 2.67 | .923 | — | — | — | — | — | — | — | — |
| 2017–18 | Vancouver Canucks | NHL | 27 | 7 | 14 | 4 | 1464 | 84 | 2 | 3.44 | .901 | — | — | — | — | — | — | — | — |
| 2018–19 | Vancouver Canucks | NHL | 12 | 3 | 8 | 1 | 718 | 37 | 0 | 3.09 | .895 | — | — | — | — | — | — | — | — |
| 2018–19 | Ottawa Senators | NHL | 24 | 11 | 11 | 0 | 1322 | 64 | 2 | 2.90 | .914 | — | — | — | — | — | — | — | — |
| 2019–20 | Ottawa Senators | NHL | 20 | 9 | 9 | 2 | 1093 | 58 | 0 | 3.18 | .908 | — | — | — | — | — | — | — | — |
| SHL totals | | | 59 | 28 | 25 | 2 | 3,287 | 121 | 8 | 2.21 | .928 | 13 | 6 | 7 | 827 | 27 | 0 | 1.96 | .931 |
| NHL totals | | | 161 | 59 | 74 | 15 | 8,900 | 454 | 6 | 3.06 | .907 | — | — | — | — | — | — | — | — |

=== International ===
| Year | Team | Event | GP | W | L | T | MIN | GA | SO | GAA | SV% |
|---|---|---|---|---|---|---|---|---|---|---|---|
| 2010 | Sweden | WJC | 1 | 1 | 0 | 0 | 60 | 3 | 0 | 3.00 | .875 |
| 2014 | Sweden | WC | 9 | 6 | 2 | 0 | 545 | 14 | 2 | 1.54 | .937 |
| 2015 | Sweden | WC | 3 | 1 | 2 | 0 | 154 | 7 | 0 | 2.73 | .899 |
| 2018 | Sweden | WC | 7 | 7 | 0 | 0 | 440 | 8 | 3 | 1.09 | .954 |
| Junior totals | | | 1 | 1 | 0 | 0 | 60 | 3 | 0 | 3.00 | .875 |
| Senior totals | | | 19 | 14 | 4 | 0 | 1139 | 29 | 5 | 1.53 | .938 |
