= Adrian Kempe =

Swedish ice hockey player (born 1996)

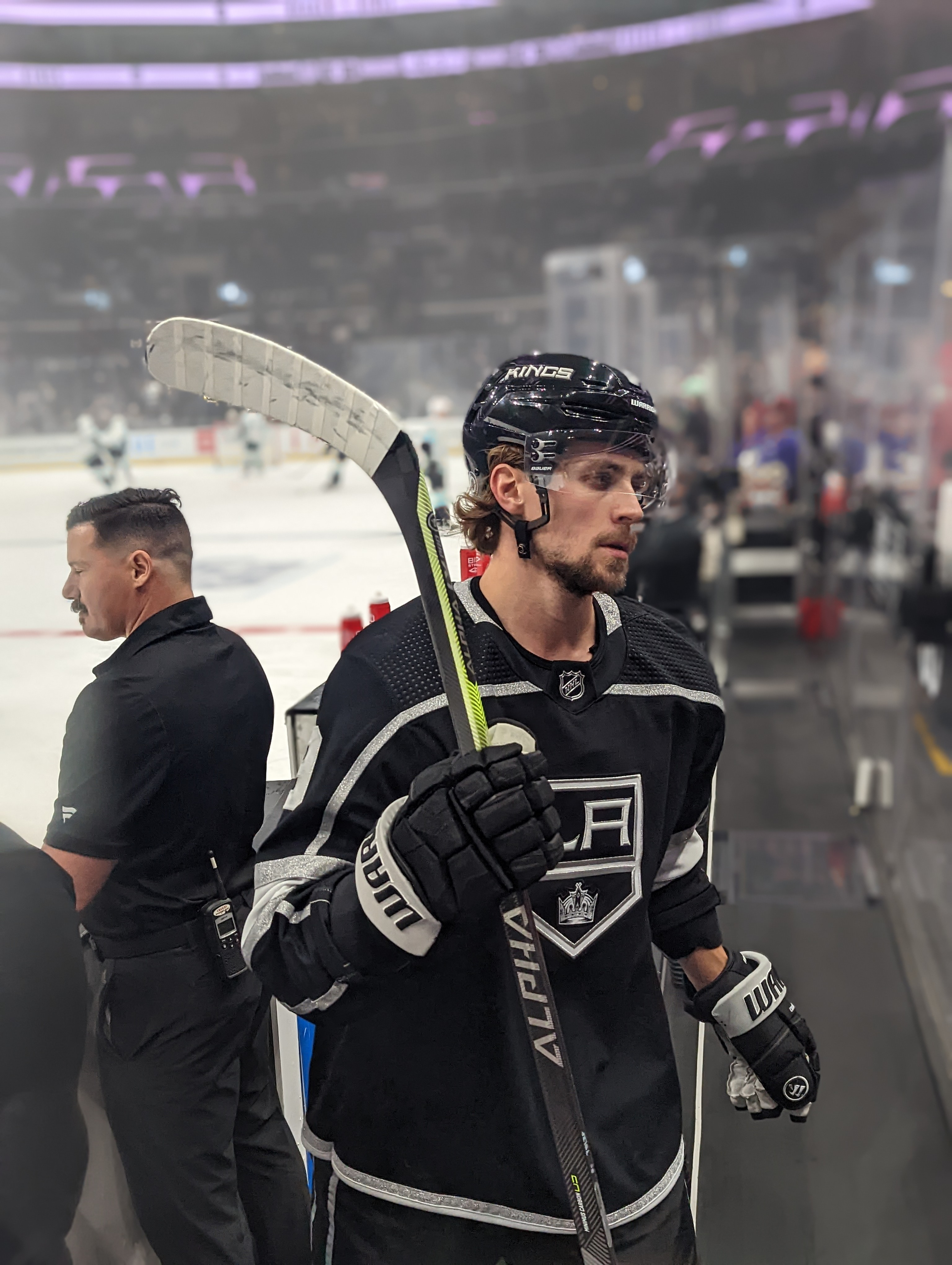
- Adrian Kempe with the Los Angeles Kings in 2022
- Born: 13 September 1996 (age 30) Kramfors, Sweden
- Height: 6 ft 2 in (188 cm)
- Weight: 205 lb (93 kg; 14 st 9 lb)
- Position: Right wing
- Shoots: Left
- NHL team Former teams: Los Angeles Kings; Modo Hockey
- National team: Sweden
- NHL draft: 29th overall, 2014; Los Angeles Kings
- Playing career: 2013–present

Michael Adrian Kempe (born 13 September 1996) is a Swedish professional ice hockey player who is a right winger and alternate captain for the Los Angeles Kings of the National Hockey League (NHL). Kempe was selected by the Kings in the first round (29th overall) of the 2014 NHL entry draft.

== Early life ==
Kempe was born on 13 September 1996 in Kramfors, Sweden.

== Playing career ==
=== Modo Hockey ===
Kempe made his Swedish Hockey League (SHL) debut playing with Modo Hockey during the 2013–14 season. At the end of the season, Kempe was selected in the first round (29th overall) by the Los Angeles Kings in the 2014 NHL entry draft. He returned to Modo for the 2014–15 season.

=== Los Angeles Kings ===
==== Early years (2014–2018) ====
Following the conclusion of his season with Modo, Kempe signed an amateur try-out agreement with the Kings American Hockey League (AHL) affiliate, the Manchester Monarchs for the remainder of their regular season and the 2015 Calder Cup playoffs. He also signed a three-year, entry-level contract with the Kings for the 2015–16 season. Kempe made his AHL debut on 17 April against the Portland Pirates playing on the second line, but impressed head coach Mike Stothers enough that he was expected to move to the first line in his second game. Over his next two games, Kempe played on the Monarchs top line alongside Brian O'Neill and Jordan Weal. Once the Monarchs qualified for the Calder Cup playoffs, Kempe developed into an integral role with the team. He scored his first AHL playoff goal in Game 5 of their first-round series against the Pirates to help the Monarchs advance to the Eastern Conference semifinals. Kempe then scored goals in Games 3 and 4 of the Eastern Conference finals to help the Monarchs sweep the Hartford Wolf Pack. In Game 5 of the Calder Cup Finals, Kempe and Vincent LoVerde scored within four minutes of each other to help the Monarchs clinch their first Calder Cup. This would also be the Monarchs final season in the AHL as Kings announced that they would be moving their AHL affiliate to Ontario, California and renaming them the Ontario Reign. Kempe finished the playoffs with eight goals and one assist for nine points over 17 games.

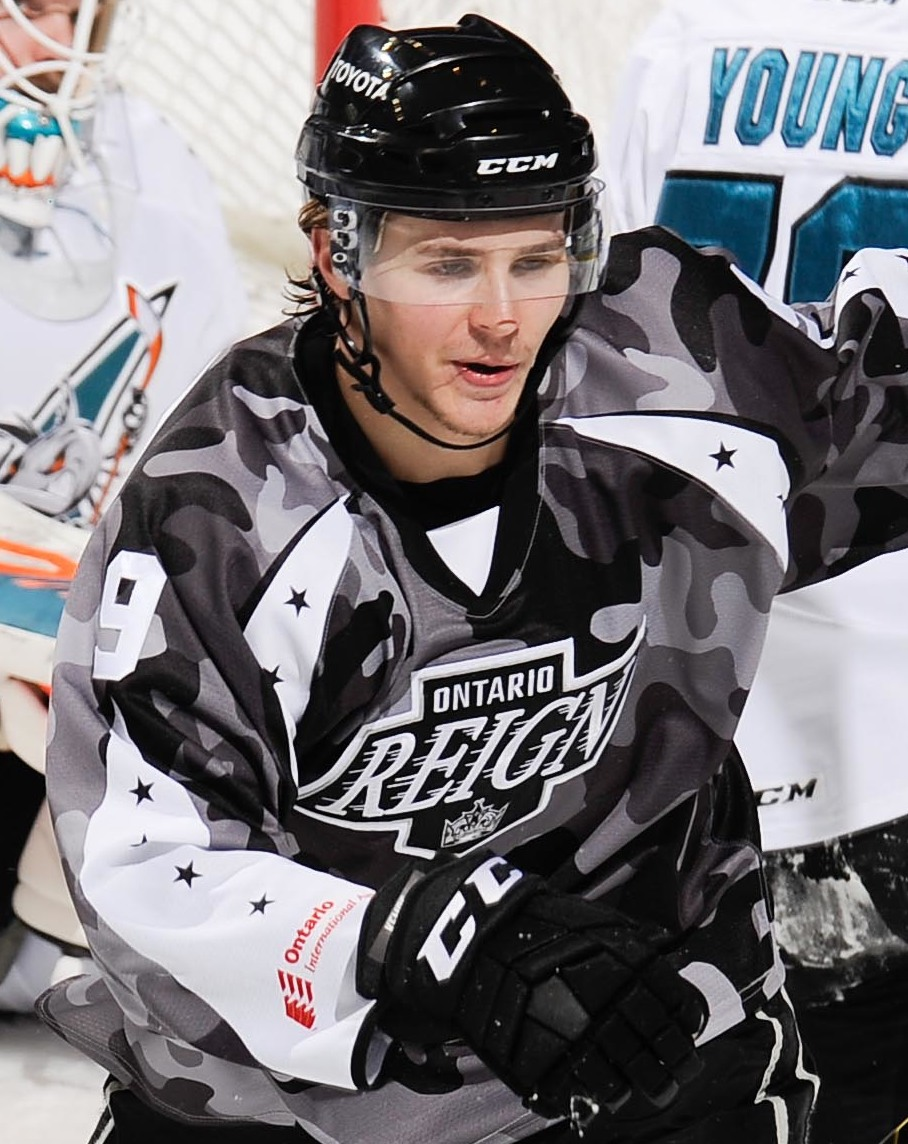
Kempe with the Ontario Reign in 2015.

After attending the Kings 2015 training camp, Kempe was re-assigned to the Reign for the 2015–16 season. As he was coming to the NHL from Europe, he was eligible to spend the full 2015–16 season in the AHL if he failed to qualify for the NHL team. (Note: Per the NHL and CHL agreement, "a signed player aged 18 or 19 who was claimed from a CHL club and is not retained by the NHL club, must be assigned to the CHL junior club whom he last played for or owes a contractual obligation.") Due to injuries throughout the lineup, Kempe spent the majority of the season playing centre as opposed to his typical winger position. Kempe began the season scoring one goal over eight games before recording his first AHL hat-trick on 5 November to lead the team 4–1 over the San Diego Gulls. He missed some time in December to compete with Team Sweden at the 2016 World Junior Ice Hockey Championships. He finished his rookie season with the Reign with 11 goals and 17 assists over 55 games.

Kempe began the 2016–17 season with the Reign after attending the Los Angeles Kings training camp. As a centreman, Kempe struggled at the start of the season, scoring three goals and two assists over 16 games. He was switched back to left wing on 3 December to improve his offensive play. He slowly improved through the next few months and added 14 points by mid-February. Kempe earned his first NHL recall on 15 February 2017, and he made his NHL debut the following day against the Arizona Coyotes. He recorded his first NHL point on 21 February by assisting on Tyler Toffoli's goal against the Colorado Avalanche and scored his first goal on 11 March against the Washington Capitals. Kempe played in 25 games for the Kings, recording two goals and four assists for six points, before being re-assigned to the AHL on 10 April. Kempe finished the regular season with the Reign with 12 goals and eight assists for 20 points over 46 games.

When attending the Kings 2017 training camp, Kempe was put on a line with Justin Auger and Kyle Clifford. After qualifying for the Kings 2017–18 opening night roster, Kempe switched from No. 39 to No. 9. He had worn the No. 9 growing up when playing soccer, in honour of Fernando Torres, and 10 when playing hockey. Kempe began the season on a line with Michael Cammalleri and Trevor Lewis but struggled to score through his first five games. After tallying his first NHL hat-trick on 18 October in a 5–1 win over the Montreal Canadiens, he added three more over the next four games. An injury to Jeff Carter in late October resulted in Kempe moving onto the Kings second line with Tyler Toffoli and Tanner Pearson. Through his first 21 games, Kempe tallied 13 points and was tied for third in goals among rookies with seven. While playing with Toffoli and Pearson, Kempe scored 14 goals through his first 44 games but was bumped back to the third-line once Carter recovered from his injury. He struggled to keep up his scoring pace on the third line and was reunited with Toffoli and Pearson after a 17-game scoring drought. Although he struggled to score, Kempe became the first Kings rookie since 2009 to record 20 assists in a season. Despite not scoring in the final 33 games of the regular season and playoffs, Kempe finished his rookie season with 16 goals and 37 points through 81 games.

==== Later years (2018–present) ====
Kempe returned to the Kings lineup for the 2018–19 season, where he was expected to play as a winger on their second line with Ilya Kovalchuk and Jeff Carter. Due to injuries throughout the lineup, Kempe began playing alongside rookies Matt Luff and Austin Wagner on the Kings third line. After scoring three goals and four assists through 26 games, Kempe suffered a lower-body injury near the end of November. He missed one game before returning on 4 December for a game against his brother and the Arizona Coyotes. Kempe then experienced a 19-game scoring drought from 13 December until the start of February. Through February, Kempe returned to his scoring form and quickly tallied four goals and four assists in three games for eight points. As he began scoring more, Kempe also earned more ice time and typically averaged more than 14 minutes per game. From 2 February to 13 March, Kempe tallied six goals and 12 points over 18 games. He finished the season with 12 goals and 16 assists for 28 points over 81 games. Once the season had concluded, Kempe joined Team Sweden to compete at the 2019 IIHF World Championship. On 4 September 2019, the Kings signed Kempe to a three-year, $6 million contract extension.

Kempe struggled at the start of the 2019–20, resulting in him being demoted to the fourth line and playing limited ice time. Through the first 17 games of the season, Kempe scored one goal and three assists. He was made a healthy scratch for a November game against the Minnesota Wild before returning to the lineup as a left winger instead of center. After scoring his 10th goal of the season on 9 January, Kempe experienced an 18-game scoring drought that was broken on 29 February. When he broke his scoring drought in a game against the New Jersey Devils, he also recorded his 100th NHL point. When the NHL paused play due to the COVID-19 pandemic, Kempe led the team with four shorthanded points while averaging 16:01 of ice time per game.

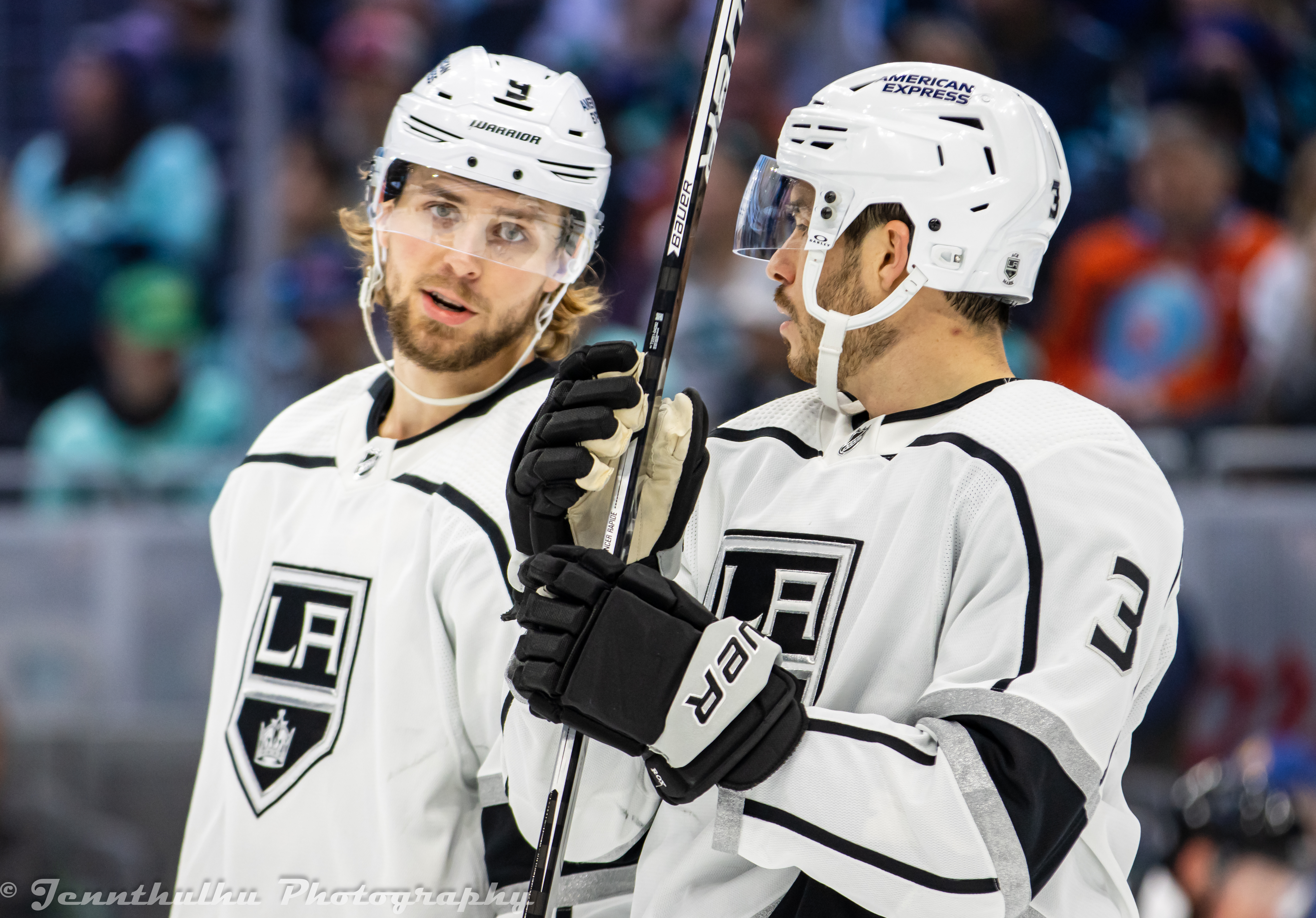
Kempe (left) talking to teammate Matt Roy during the 2022–23 season.

Due to the COVID-19 pandemic, the 2020–21 season was reduced to 56 games and began on 13 January 2021. During the shortened season, Kempe was on pace to set new career highs in goals and assists. He earned praise from head coach Todd McLellan for being a versatile player who was able to play different positions whenever needed. On 9 March 2021, Kempe recorded his second career hat-trick and the first by a Kings player against the Anaheim Ducks. He finished the season with 14 goals and 15 assists for 29 points and was named to Team Sweden for the 2021 IIHF World Championship.

Entering his sixth season with the Kings, 2021–22 would be a breakout year for Kempe, who posted new career highs scoring 35 goals and 54 points. He would also participate in his first NHL All-Star Game, held in Las Vegas; he was the only player from the Kings named to the All Stars that season.

On 10 July 2022, Kempe signed a four-year, $22 million extension with the Kings. Kempe would once again lead the Kings in goals scored, adding 41 goals to his total, and becoming the first Kings player since Luc Robitaille to score 40 goals in a season.

On 17 November 2025, coming into the final year of his most recent contract, Kempe signed an eight-year, $85 million extension to remain with the Kings through to the 2033–34 season.

== International play ==
Medal record

Representing Sweden

Ice hockey

World Championships
Gold medal – first place	2018 Denmark	
Bronze medal – third place	2024 Czechia	

Kempe has represented Sweden at the junior and senior levels in international competitions. He represented Sweden at the 2018 IIHF World Championship, where they won a gold medal, and at the 2024 IIHF World Championship, where they won a bronze medal.

== Personal life ==
Kempe's older brother Mario also played professional ice hockey, including 52 games with the Arizona Coyotes.

Kempe's nickname "Juice" originated during the Monarchs' playoff run to the 2015 Calder Cup, in which the 18-year-old Kempe scored eight goals. His teammates and coaches described him as "having the juice" due to his impressive performance.

In terms of investments, Kempe became part-owner of Swedish esports organization EYEBALLERS in May 2024.

== Career statistics ==
=== Regular season and playoffs ===
			Regular season					Playoffs
Season	Team	League	GP	G	A	Pts	PIM	GP	G	A	Pts	PIM
2010–11	Kramfors–Alliansen	J18	25	1	7	8	10	3	1	0	1	0
2011–12	Djurgårdens IF	J18	18	9	7	16	8	—	—	—	—	—
2011–12	Djurgårdens IF	J18 Allsv	16	1	3	4	16	4	0	2	2	0
2012–13	Modo Hockey	J18	1	1	1	2	0	—	—	—	—	—
2012–13	Modo Hockey	J18 Allsv	2	0	0	0	2	2	0	2	2	0
2012–13	Modo Hockey	J20	39	6	7	13	36	7	1	0	1	4
2013–14	Modo Hockey	J20	20	3	16	19	32	5	1	1	2	6
2013–14	Modo Hockey	J18 Allsv	—	—	—	—	—	4	5	3	8	6
2013–14	Modo Hockey	SHL	45	5	6	11	12	2	0	1	1	0
2014–15	Modo Hockey	SHL	50	5	12	17	42	—	—	—	—	—
2014–15	Modo Hockey	J20	—	—	—	—	—	2	1	3	4	2
2014–15	Manchester Monarchs	AHL	3	0	0	0	2	17	8	1	9	2
2015–16	Ontario Reign	AHL	55	11	17	28	27	13	4	1	5	2
2016–17	Ontario Reign	AHL	46	12	8	20	44	5	0	2	2	2
2016–17	Los Angeles Kings	NHL	25	2	4	6	6	—	—	—	—	—
2017–18	Los Angeles Kings	NHL	81	16	21	37	49	4	0	0	0	2
2018–19	Los Angeles Kings	NHL	81	12	16	28	50	—	—	—	—	—
2019–20	Los Angeles Kings	NHL	69	11	21	32	29	—	—	—	—	—
2020–21	Los Angeles Kings	NHL	56	14	15	29	28	—	—	—	—	—
2021–22	Los Angeles Kings	NHL	78	35	19	54	46	7	2	4	6	0
2022–23	Los Angeles Kings	NHL	82	41	26	67	55	6	5	3	8	2
2023–24	Los Angeles Kings	NHL	77	28	47	75	72	5	4	1	5	4
2024–25	Los Angeles Kings	NHL	81	35	38	73	36	6	4	6	10	4
2025–26	Los Angeles Kings	NHL	81	36	37	73	58	4	1	1	2	4
SHL totals			95	10	18	28	54	2	0	1	1	0
NHL totals			711	230	244	474	429	32	16	15	31	16

=== International ===
Year	Team	Event	Result	GP	G	A	Pts	PIM
2013	Sweden	WHC17	1st place, gold medalist(s)	5	5	0	5	2
2013	Sweden	IH18	7th	4	2	1	3	12
2014	Sweden	U18	4th	7	1	6	7	16
2015	Sweden	WJC	4th	6	4	4	8	2
2016	Sweden	WJC	4th	7	3	5	8	8
2018	Sweden	WC	1st place, gold medalist(s)	10	2	6	8	8
2019	Sweden	WC	5th	8	3	3	6	2
2021	Sweden	WC	9th	7	1	4	5	2
2024	Sweden	WC	3rd place, bronze medalist(s)	10	0	6	6	4
2025	Sweden	4NF	3rd	3	1	0	1	0
2026	Sweden	OG	3rd	5	2	2	4	4
Junior totals				29	15	16	31	40
Senior totals				43	9	21	30	20

== Awards and honours ==
Award	Year
NHL
NHL All-Star Game	2022

== Notes ==
Awards and achievements
Preceded by Tanner Pearson	Los Angeles Kings first-round draft pick 2014	Succeeded by Gabriel Vilardi
