= 2017 IIHF World Championship Group A =

Group A was one of two groups of the 2017 IIHF World Championship. The four best placed teams advanced to the playoff round, while the last placed team was relegated to Division I in 2018.

== Standings ==
Pos	Team	Pld	W	OTW	OTL	L	GF	GA	GD	Pts	Qualification or relegation
1	United States	7	6	0	0	1	31	14	+17	18	Playoff round
2	Russia	7	5	1	0	1	35	10	+25	17	Playoff round
3	Sweden	7	5	0	1	1	29	13	+16	16	Playoff round
4	Germany (H)	7	2	2	1	2	20	23	−3	11	Playoff round
5	Latvia	7	3	0	1	3	14	18	−4	10	
6	Denmark	7	1	2	0	4	13	22	−9	7	
7	Slovakia	7	0	1	2	4	12	28	−16	4	
8	Italy (R)	7	0	0	1	6	6	32	−26	1	Relegation to Division I A (Note: The rules state that "the bottom ranked two teams will be relegated" and the 2018 hosts (Denmark) cannot be relegated by rule.)

Source: IIHF
Rules for classification: 1) points; 2) head-to-head points; 3) head-to-head goal difference; 4) head-to-head number of goals scored; 5) result against closest best-ranked team outside tied teams; 6) result against second-best ranked team outside tied teams; 7) seeding before tournament.
(H) Host; (R) Relegated
Notes:

All times are local (UTC+2).

== Matches ==
=== Sweden vs Russia ===
5 May 2017; 16:15	Sweden	1–2 GWS (1–0, 0–0, 0–1) (OT 0–0) (SO: 0–1)	Russia	Lanxess Arena, Cologne; Attendance: 18,357

Game reference
Viktor Fasth	Goalies	Andrei Vasilevskiy	Referees: (Finland) Anssi Salonen (Switzerland) Daniel Stricker; Linesmen: (Switzerland) Roman Kaderli (Canada) Nathan Vanoosten
Lindholm (Rask, Hedman) – 14:40 / 1–0; / 1–1 / 43:58 – Andronov (Barabanov, Provorov)			Referees: (Finland) Anssi Salonen (Switzerland) Daniel Stricker; Linesmen: (Switzerland) Roman Kaderli (Canada) Nathan Vanoosten
Lindholm (miss); Ekman-Larsson (miss); Nylander (miss)	Shootout	(miss) Gusev; Panarin	Referees: (Finland) Anssi Salonen (Switzerland) Daniel Stricker; Linesmen: (Switzerland) Roman Kaderli (Canada) Nathan Vanoosten
4 min	Penalties	2 min	Referees: (Finland) Anssi Salonen (Switzerland) Daniel Stricker; Linesmen: (Switzerland) Roman Kaderli (Canada) Nathan Vanoosten
23	Shots	30	Referees: (Finland) Anssi Salonen (Switzerland) Daniel Stricker; Linesmen: (Switzerland) Roman Kaderli (Canada) Nathan Vanoosten

=== United States vs Germany ===
5 May 2017; 20:15	United States	1–2 (0–1, 0–0, 1–1)	Germany	Lanxess Arena, Cologne; Attendance: 18,688

Game reference

Jimmy Howard
Goalies
Thomas Greiss
Referees:
(Canada) Oliver Gouin
(Slovakia) Jozef Kubuš
Linesmen:
(Finland) Hannu Sormunen
(Czech Republic) Libor Suchánek

	0–1	10:50 – Rieder (Reimer, Kahun)
Murphy (Larkin, Nelson) – 51:00	1–1
	1–2	53:58 – Hager (D. Seidenberg, Gogulla) (PP)

4 min
Penalties
4 min
43
Shots
27

=== Latvia vs Denmark ===
6 May 2017; 12:15	Latvia	3–0 (0–0, 1–0, 2–0)	Denmark	Lanxess Arena, Cologne; Attendance: 13,453

Game reference

Elvis Merzļikins
Goalies
Sebastian Dahm
Referees:
(Sweden) Linus Öhlund
(Switzerland) Daniel Stricker
Linesmen:
(Switzerland) Roman Kaderli
(Czech Republic) Libor Suchánek

Meija (Kulda) – 23:08	1–0
Indrašis (Sprukts, Ri. Bukarts) – 41:48	2–0
Indrašis (Ro. Bukarts, Balinskis) (PP2) – 52:40	3–0

6 min
Penalties
12 min
35
Shots
27

=== Slovakia vs Italy ===
6 May 2017; 16:15	Slovakia	3–2 OT (1–0, 0–1, 1–1) (OT 1–0)	Italy	Lanxess Arena, Cologne; Attendance: 12,229

Game reference

Július Hudáček
Goalies
Andreas Bernard
Referees:
(Canada) Oliver Gouin
(Czech Republic) Antonín Jeřábek
Linesmen:
(Netherlands) Joep Leermakers
(Russia) Alexander Otmakhov

Miklík (Jánošík, Čerešňák) – 06:58	1–0
	1–1	35:06 – Morini (Frigo)
	1–2	42:41 – Frigo (Scandella)
L. Hudáček (Miklík, Sersen) (EA) – 58:56	2–2
Čerešňák (Bližňák, Skokan) – 62:45	3–2

2 min
Penalties
8 min
32
Shots
19

=== Germany vs Sweden ===
6 May 2017; 20:15	Germany	2–7 (1–1, 1–3, 0–3)	Sweden	Lanxess Arena, Cologne; Attendance: 18,673

Game reference

Thomas Greiss
Danny aus den Birken
Goalies
Viktor Fasth
Referees:
(Russia) Roman Gofman
(Latvia) Eduards Odiņš
Linesmen:
(Belarus) Ivan Dedyulya
(United States) Brian Oliver

	0–1	06:56 – Ekman-Larsson (Landeskog, Rask)
Hager (D. Seidenberg, Ehliz) – 16:14	1–1
	1–2	20:23 – Rask (Hedman, Strålman) (PP)
Gogulla (Hager, Schütz) (PP) – 25:26	2–2
	2–3	35:14 – Omark (Krüger)
	2–4	39:57 – Brodin (Nylander, Eriksson Ek)
	2–5	49:42 – Landeskog (Rask, Söderberg)
	2–6	50:40 – Nylander (Strålman)
	2–7	51:59 – Nylander (Landeskog)

10 min
Penalties
10 min
24
Shots
44

=== Italy vs Russia ===
7 May 2017; 12:15	Italy	1–10 (0–2, 1–3, 0–5)	Russia	Lanxess Arena, Cologne; Attendance: 10,893

Game reference

Frederic Cloutier
Goalies
Andrei Vasilevskiy
Ilya Sorokin
Referees:
(Slovakia) Jozef Kubuš
(Sweden) Linus Öhlund
Linesmen:
(United States) Brian Oliver
(Finland) Sakari Suominen

	0–1	09:35 – Andronov (Barabanov, Gavrikov)
	0–2	18:59 – Dadonov (Panarin, Shipachyov) (PP)
Traversa (Bernard, Helfer) – 23:40	1–2
	1–3	24:51 – Kucherov (Namestnikov, Gusev) (PP)
	1–4	35:04 – Namestnikov (Kucherov)
	1–5	36:21 – Panarin (Mozyakin, Shipachyov) (PP)
	1–6	43:39 – Plotnikov (Kucherov, Namestnikov) (PP)
	1–7	45:29 – Mozyakin (Shipachyov, Panarin) (PP)
	1–8	45:48 – Namestnikov (Kucherov, Gusev)
	1–9	50:21 – Panarin (Mozyakin, Shipachyov) (PP)
	1–10	58:54 – Andronov (Barabanov, Provorov)

12 min
Penalties
6 min
15
Shots
36

=== United States vs Denmark ===
7 May 2017; 16:15	United States	7–2 (3–1, 3–1, 1–0)	Denmark	Lanxess Arena, Cologne; Attendance: 8,764

Game reference

Connor Hellebuyck
Goalies
Sebastian Dahm
Referees:
(Czech Republic) Antonín Jeřábek
(Latvia) Eduards Odiņš
Linesmen:
(Belarus) Ivan Dedyulya
(Netherlands) Joep Leermakers

Lee (Gaudreau, Larkin) (PP) – 05:37	1–0
Keller (McAvoy, Schmaltz) – 13:06	2–0
	2–1	16:10 – Madsen (Ehlers, J. Jensen) (PP)
Gaudreau (Larkin) (PP) – 18:59	3–1
	3–2	21:08 – Hardt (Jakobsen)
Keller (Bjugstad) – 34:33	4–2
Lee (Hanifin, Eichel) (PP) – 37:09	5–2
Nelson (Schmaltz) – 37:37	6–2
Keller – 53:00	7–2

12 min
Penalties
24 min
34
Shots
25

=== Latvia vs Slovakia ===
7 May 2017; 20:15	Latvia	3–1 (1–0, 1–0, 1–1)	Slovakia	Lanxess Arena, Cologne; Attendance: 8,149

Game reference

Elvis Merzļikins
Goalies
Ján Laco
Referees:
(Russia) Roman Gofman
(Finland) Anssi Salonen
Linesmen:
(Russia) Alexander Otmakhov
(Canada) Nathan Vanoosten

Sprukts (Ri. Bukarts, Girgensons) (PP) – 10:24	1–0
Girgensons (Ri. Bukarts, Ro. Bukarts) (PP) – 27:26	2–0
	2–1	49:09 – Miklík (Dravecký, Haščák) (PP)
Džeriņš (Cibuļskis, Daugaviņš) (PP) – 50:36	3–1

12 min
Penalties
37 min
22
Shots
30

=== Germany vs Russia ===
8 May 2017; 16:15	Germany	3–6 (0–3, 0–2, 3–1)	Russia	Lanxess Arena, Cologne; Attendance: 18,734

Game reference

Thomas Greiss
Goalies
Andrei Vasilevskiy
Referees:
(Canada) Oliver Gouin
(Finland) Anssi Salonen
Linesmen:
(Czech Republic) Libor Suchánek
(Canada) Nathan Vanoosten

	0–1	01:04 – Shipachyov (Dadonov, Panarin)
	0–2	17:10 – Shipachyov (Gusev, Panarin) (PP)
	0–3	18:15 – Plotnikov (Antipin, Provorov) (PP)
	0–4	31:10 – Gusev (Panarin, Belov) (PP)
	0–5	35:16 – Kucherov
Macek (Müller, D. Seidenberg) – 45:53	1–5
Gogulla (Ehrhoff, Kahun) (PP) – 48:34	2–5
	2–6	51:40 – Kucherov (Panarin)
Tiffels (Kink, D. Seidenberg) – 59:10	3–6

29 min
Penalties
12 min
29
Shots
35

=== United States vs Sweden ===
8 May 2017; 20:15	United States	4–3 (2–3, 1–0, 1–0)	Sweden	Lanxess Arena, Cologne; Attendance: 18,398

Game reference

Jimmy Howard
Goalies
Viktor Fasth
Referees:
(Slovakia) Jozef Kubuš
(Switzerland) Daniel Stricker
Linesmen:
(Switzerland) Roman Kaderli
(Finland) Hannu Sormunen

	0–1	02:14 – Lindholm (Strålman) (PP)
Keller (Eichel, Trouba) – 03:21	1–1
	1–2	13:23 – Lindholm (Ekman-Larsson)
Gaudreau (Larkin) – 18:12	2–2
	2–3	18:47 – Hedman (Nordström, Klingberg)
Gaudreau (Eichel, Lee) – 22:57	3–3
Compher (Murphy, Larkin) – 51:47	4–3

12 min
Penalties
6 min
27
Shots
42

=== Italy vs Latvia ===
9 May 2017; 16:15	Italy	1–2 (1–1, 0–0, 0–1)	Latvia	Lanxess Arena, Cologne; Attendance: 6,332

Game reference

Andreas Bernard
Goalies
Elvis Merzļikins
Referees:
(Canada) Brett Iverson
(Switzerland) Tobias Wehrli
Linesmen:
(Belarus) Ivan Dedyulya
(Russia) Alexander Otmakhov

Insam (Traversa) – 03:38	1–0
	1–1	12:09 – Džeriņš (Galviņš, Daugaviņš) (PP)
	1–2	58:41 – Džeriņš (Ro. Bukarts)

2 min
Penalties
6 min
21
Shots
24

=== Slovakia vs Denmark ===
9 May 2017; 20:15	Slovakia	3–4 GWS (0–1, 0–2, 3–0) (OT: 0–0) (SO: 0–1)	Denmark	Lanxess Arena, Cologne; Attendance: 4,454

Game reference

Július Hudáček
Goalies
Sebastian Dahm
Referees:
(Austria) Mark Lemelin
(Sweden) Marcus Linde
Linesmen:
(Netherlands) Joep Leermakers
(United States) Brian Oliver

	0–1	16:20 – Hardt (Storm, Green) (PP)
	0–2	24:46 – Russell (Bau, O. Lauridsen)
	0–3	39:57 – Poulsen (O. Lauridsen, Green)
Gernát (Miklík, Haščák) – 41:22	1–3
Bližňák (Haščák, Dravecký) (PP) – 46:05	2–3
Miklík (Čerešňák, Dravecký) (PP) – 51:53	3–3

L. Hudáček (miss)
Haščák (miss)
Dravecký (miss)
Shootout
(miss) Ehlers
(miss) Christensen
Green
14 min
Penalties
16 min
32
Shots
26

=== United States vs Italy ===
10 May 2017; 16:15	United States	3–0 (1–0, 2–0, 0–0)	Italy	Lanxess Arena, Cologne; Attendance: 7,168

Game reference

Jimmy Howard
Goalies
Andreas Bernard
Referees:
(Czech Republic) Jan Hribik
(Sweden) Marcus Linde
Linesmen:
(Russia) Gleb Lazarev
(Sweden) Andreas Malmqvist

Nelson – 05:17	1–0
Nelson (Larkin) (SH) – 25:53	2–0
Lee (Gaudreau, Larkin) (PP) – 27:47	3–0

4 min
Penalties
6 min
32
Shots
8

=== Slovakia vs Germany ===
10 May 2017; 20:15	Slovakia	2–3 GWS (1–0, 1–2, 0–0) (OT 0–0) (SO: 0–1)	Germany	Lanxess Arena, Cologne; Attendance: 17,647

Game reference

Július Hudáček
Goalies
Thomas Greiss
Danny aus den Birken
Referees:
(Finland) Stefan Fonselius
(Canada) Brett Iverson
Linesmen:
(Denmark) Rene Jensen
(United States) Judson Ritter

Matoušek (Zigo, Šedivý) – 09:23	1–0
Hudáček (Čajkovský) – 21:58	2–0
	2–1	36:11 – Reimer (Ehrhoff, Kahun) (PP)
	2–2	36:38 – Ehliz (D. Seidenberg, Müller)

Hrnka (miss)
Bližňák (miss)
Miklík (miss)
Shootout
Kahun
(miss) Macek
(miss) Ehliz
4 min
Penalties
4 min
28
Shots
31

=== Russia vs Denmark ===
11 May 2017; 16:15	Russia	3–0 (0–0, 3–0, 0–0)	Denmark	Lanxess Arena, Cologne; Attendance: 6,932

Game reference

Andrei Vasilevskiy
Goalies
Georg Sørensen
Referees:
(United States) Stephen Reneau
(Switzerland) Tobias Wehrli
Linesmen:
(Germany) Lukas Kohlmüller
(Czech Republic) Miroslav Lhotský

Kiselevich (Panarin, Kucherov) – 35:36	1–0
Plotnikov (Andronov, Telegin) – 35:54	2–0
Gusev (Kucherov, Dadonov) – 36:46	3–0

2 min
Penalties
4 min
33
Shots
21

=== Sweden vs Latvia ===
11 May 2017; 20:15	Sweden	2–0 (1–0, 0–0, 1–0)	Latvia	Lanxess Arena, Cologne; Attendance: 8,276

Game reference
Eddie Läck	Goalies	Elvis Merzļikins	Referees: (Austria) Mark Lemelin (Germany) Daniel Piechaczek; Linesmen: (Slovakia) Peter Šefčík (Finland) Sakari Suominen
Landeskog (Rask, Lindholm) – 09:13 / 1–0; Lindholm (Rask) – 56:42 / 2–0			Referees: (Austria) Mark Lemelin (Germany) Daniel Piechaczek; Linesmen: (Slovakia) Peter Šefčík (Finland) Sakari Suominen
16 min	Penalties	6 min	Referees: (Austria) Mark Lemelin (Germany) Daniel Piechaczek; Linesmen: (Slovakia) Peter Šefčík (Finland) Sakari Suominen
30	Shots	19	Referees: (Austria) Mark Lemelin (Germany) Daniel Piechaczek; Linesmen: (Slovakia) Peter Šefčík (Finland) Sakari Suominen

=== Sweden vs Italy ===
12 May 2017; 16:15	Sweden	8–1 (2–0, 1–1, 5–0)	Italy	Lanxess Arena, Cologne; Attendance: 10,878

Game reference

Viktor Fasth
Goalies
Frédéric Cloutier
Referees:
(Finland) Stefan Fonselius
(Canada) Brett Iverson
Linesmen:
(Denmark) Rene Jensen
(Finland) Sakari Suominen

Rask (Lindholm) – 03:24	1–0
Holm (Nylander, Brodin) – 08:34	2–0
	2–1	23:50 – Morini (Scandella, Insam) (PP)
Brodin (Holm) – 29:52	3–1
Lindholm (Landeskog, Strålman) – 40:41	4–1
Omark (Söderberg, Edler) – 50:09	5–1
C. Klingberg (Nordström) – 54:53	6–1
Eriksson Ek (Nylander) – 56:51	7–1
J. Klingberg (Holm, Nylander) – 58:25	8–1

4 min
Penalties
4 min
45
Shots
15

=== Denmark vs Germany ===
12 May 2017; 20:15	Denmark	3–2 OT (2–2, 0–0, 0–0) (OT 1–0)	Germany	Lanxess Arena, Cologne; Attendance: 18,629

Game reference

Sebastian Dahm
Goalies
Danny aus den Birken
Referees:
(Czech Republic) Jan Hribik
(Sweden) Marcus Linde
Linesmen:
(Russia) Gleb Lazarev
(Czech Republic) Miroslav Lhotský

	0–1	08:26 – Reimer (Ehliz, D. Seidenberg)
	0–2	09:43 – Macek (Y. Seidenberg, Kahun)
Storm (Kristensen, Jakobsen) – 16:09	1–2
Poulsen (Christensen) – 16:34	2–2
Regin (Ehlers, Dahm) – 61:40	3–2

10 min
Penalties
12 min
29
Shots
29

=== Latvia vs United States ===
13 May 2017; 12:15	Latvia	3–5 (1–0, 2–3, 0–2)	United States	Lanxess Arena, Cologne; Attendance: 17,936

Game reference

Elvis Merzļikins
Goalies
Connor Hellebuyck
Referees:
(Finland) Stefan Fonselius
(Canada) Brett Iverson
Linesmen:
(Denmark) Rene Jensen
(Russia) Gleb Lazarev

Bļugers (Bičevskis) – 11:23	1–0
Daugaviņš (Džeriņš, Ro. Bukarts) – 20:07	2–0
	2–1	29:00 – Compher (Lee)
Cibuļskis (Indrašis) (PP) – 31:37	3–1
	3–2	33:44 – Bjugstad (Schmaltz, Keller)
	3–3	38:37 – Gaudreau (Trouba, Bjugstad)
	3–4	56:38 – Copp (Hellebuyck)
	3–5	58:58 – Larkin (ENG)

6 min
Penalties
8 min
23
Shots
33

=== Russia vs Slovakia ===
13 May 2017; 16:15	Russia	6–0 (3–0, 2–0, 1–0)	Slovakia	Lanxess Arena, Cologne; Attendance: 18,591

Game reference

Andrei Vasilevskiy
Goalies
Július Hudáček
Referees:
(Austria) Mark Lemelin
(Germany) Daniel Piechaczek
Linesmen:
(Germany) Lukas Kohlmüller
(United States) Judson Ritter

Dadonov (Gusev, Shipachyov) – 01:12	1–0
Dadonov (Gusev, Shipachyov) (PP) – 13:32	2–0
Mironov – 19:19	3–0
Kucherov (Tkachyov, Kiselevich) – 22:53	4–0
Telegin (Zub, Plotnikov) – 32:50	5–0
Gavrikov (Shipachyov, Dadonov) – 55:47	6–0

6 min
Penalties
8 min
39
Shots
22

=== Italy vs Germany ===
13 May 2017; 20:15	Italy	1–4 (1–2, 0–2, 0–0)	Germany	Lanxess Arena, Cologne; Attendance: 18,712

Game reference

Andreas Bernard
Goalies
Danny aus den Birken
Referees:
(United States) Stephen Reneau
(Switzerland) Tobias Wehrli
Linesmen:
(Sweden) Andreas Malmqvist
(Slovakia) Peter Šefčík

	0–1	03:34 – Ehrhoff (Draisaitl)
M. Marchetti (S. Kostner, S. Marchetti) – 04:21	1–1
	1–2	18:16 – Plachta (D. Seidenberg, Kahun) (PP)
	1–3	22:46 – Y. Seidenberg (Hördler)
	1–4	26:00 – Kahun (Y. Seidenberg)

4 min
Penalties
8 min
18
Shots
37

=== Slovakia vs United States ===
14 May 2017; 16:15	Slovakia	1–6 (0–1, 1–3, 0–2)	United States	Lanxess Arena, Cologne; Attendance: 13,267

Game reference

Július Hudáček
Goalies
Jimmy Howard
Referees:
(Czech Republic) Jan Hribik
(Switzerland) Tobias Wehrli
Linesmen:
(Sweden) Andreas Malmqvist
(Finland) Sakari Suominen

	0–1	08:12 – Keller (Lee, Skjei)
	0–2	25:57 – Gaudreau (Hayes)
Gernát (L. Hudáček, Dravecký) – 30:40	1–2
	1–3	36:04 – Dvorak (Gaudreau)
	1–4	38:01 – Trouba
	1–5	42:16 – Gaudreau (Hayes)
	1–6	47:23 – Lee (Eichel, Hanifin) (PP)

10 min
Penalties
8 min
20
Shots
28

=== Denmark vs Sweden ===
14 May 2017; 20:15	Denmark	2–4 (0–1, 0–2, 2–1)	Sweden	Lanxess Arena, Cologne; Attendance: 10,314

Game reference

Georg Sørensen
Goalies
Henrik Lundqvist
Referees:
(Germany) Daniel Piechaczek
(United States) Stephen Reneau
Linesmen:
(Germany) Lukas Kohlmüller
(Slovakia) Peter Šefčík

	0–1	02:19 – J. Lundqvist (Krüger, Eriksson Ek)
	0–2	35:20 – Nylander (J. Klingberg, Lindberg)
	0–3	39:06 – Nylander (Bäckström)
Madsen (Ehlers) – 49:11	1–3
Lauridsen (Ehlers, Regin) – 55:17	2–3
	2–4	57:31 – Bäckström (J. Klingberg, Nylander) (PP)

4 min
Penalties
12 min
21
Shots
33

=== Denmark vs Italy ===
15 May 2017; 16:15	Denmark	2–0 (0–0, 0–0, 2–0)	Italy	Lanxess Arena, Cologne; Attendance: 5,653

Game reference
Sebastian Dahm	Goalies	Andreas Bernard	Referees: (Finland) Stefan Fonselius (Latvia) Eduards Odiņš; Linesmen: (United States) Judson Ritter (Finland) Sakari Suominen
Hardt (Storm, Jakobsen) (PP) – 57:36 / 1–0; Regin (ENG) – 58:47 / 2–0			Referees: (Finland) Stefan Fonselius (Latvia) Eduards Odiņš; Linesmen: (United States) Judson Ritter (Finland) Sakari Suominen
2 min	Penalties	4 min	Referees: (Finland) Stefan Fonselius (Latvia) Eduards Odiņš; Linesmen: (United States) Judson Ritter (Finland) Sakari Suominen
38	Shots	16	Referees: (Finland) Stefan Fonselius (Latvia) Eduards Odiņš; Linesmen: (United States) Judson Ritter (Finland) Sakari Suominen

=== Russia vs Latvia ===
15 May 2017; 20:15	Russia	5–0 (2–0, 2–0, 1–0)	Latvia	Lanxess Arena, Cologne; Attendance: 16,439

Game reference

Ilya Sorokin
Goalies
Ivars Punnenovs
Referees:
(Czech Republic) Jan Hribik
(Czech Republic) Antonín Jeřábek
Linesmen:
(Denmark) Rene Jensen
(Czech Republic) Miroslav Lhotský

Kiselevich (Panarin, Kucherov) – 12:10	1–0
Telegin (Plotnikov) – 18:41	2–0
Namestnikov (Panarin, Kucherov) (PP) – 20:57	3–0
Kucherov (Panarin, Belov) – 39:00	4–0
Belov (Gusev, Shipachyov) (PP) – 53:17	5–0

8 min
Penalties
8 min
36
Shots
24

=== Sweden vs Slovakia ===
16 May 2017; 12:15	Sweden	4–2 (2–0, 1–1, 1–1)	Slovakia	Lanxess Arena, Cologne; Attendance: 10,259

Game reference

Henrik Lundqvist
Goalies
Július Hudáček
Jaroslav Janus
Referees:
(Czech Republic) Antonín Jeřábek
(Latvia) Eduards Odiņš
Linesmen:
(Germany) Lukas Kohlmüller
(Russia) Gleb Lazarev

Nylander (Bäckström, Klingberg) – 04:02	1–0
Ekman-Larsson (Everberg, Karlsson) – 08:14	2–0
	2–1	24:08 – Matoušek (Skalický, Zigo)
Everberg (Karlsson) – 25:45	3–1
	3–2	41:34 – Kudrna (Cingeľ)
Karlsson (Edler) (ENG) – 59:28	4–2

8 min
Penalties
4 min
38
Shots
15

=== Russia vs United States ===
16 May 2017; 16:15	Russia	3–5 (1–0, 2–3, 0–2)	United States	Lanxess Arena, Cologne; Attendance: 18,756

Game reference

Andrei Vasilevskiy
Goalies
Jimmy Howard
Referees:
(Finland) Anssi Salonen
(Switzerland) Daniel Stricker
Linesmen:
(Czech Republic) Miroslav Lhotský
(Sweden) Andreas Malmqvist

Gusev (Kiselevich) – 12:29	1–0
	1–1	21:00 – Hayes (Nelson, Keller) (PP)
Belov (Plotnikov, Andronov) – 27:33	2–1
	2–2	32:18 – Larkin (Nelson)
Gusev (Shipachyov, Dadonov) – 36:15	3–2
	3–3	37:43 – Hayes (Gaudreau, Bjugstad)
	3–4	52:57 – Lee (Gaudreau, Eichel) (PP)
	3–5	59:38 – Nelson (Larkin) (ENG)

16 min
Penalties
8 min
19
Shots
35

=== Germany vs Latvia ===
16 May 2017; 20:15	Germany	4–3 GWS (0–0, 2–1, 1–2) (OT 0–0) (SO: 1–0)	Latvia	Lanxess Arena, Cologne; Attendance: 18,797

Game reference

Philipp Grubauer
Goalies
Elvis Merzļikins
Referees:
(Canada) Oliver Gouin
(Sweden) Linus Öhlund
Linesmen:
(United States) Judson Ritter
(Slovakia) Peter Šefčík

Wolf (Ehrhoff, Reimer) (PP) – 31:02	1–0
Seidenberg (Kink, Müller) – 31:29	2–0
	2–1	38:42 – Skvorcovs (Sotnieks)
	2–2	48:22 – Sprukts (Indrašis, Sotnieks)
	2–3	56:08 – Džeriņš (Balinskis, Bukarts) (PP)
Schütz (Draisaitl) (PP, EA) – 59:27	3–3

Kahun (miss)
Draisaitl (miss)
Tiffels
Shootout
(miss) Indrašis
(miss) Daugaviņš
(miss) Bukarts
6 min
Penalties
8 min
41
Shots
30
