= 2017 IIHF World Championship final =

Ice hockey match

	1	2	3	OT	SO	Total
Canada	0	0	1	0	0	1
Sweden	0	1	0	0	1	2
- Date: 21 May 2017
- Arena: Lanxess Arena
- City: Cologne
- Attendance: 17,363

The 2017 IIHF World Championship final was played at Lanxess Arena in Cologne, Germany, on 21 May 2017. Teams representing Sweden and Canada competed for the title of World Champion in ice hockey.

The first period of the game was scoreless. Sweden took the lead towards the end of the second period. Canada struck back with a power play goal early in the third period and the game ended with the score tied 1–1. An overtime period saw no further scoring, taking the final to a shootout. Sweden scored two of their three attempts, whilst Canada missed their first four, giving Sweden won the gold medal. It was Sweden's tenth title.

== Road to the final ==
Canada had finished top of their group; of their seven games, they won six and lost one in overtime. In the knock-out stages, Canada beat Germany in the quarter-finals and Russia in the semi-finals.

Sweden finished third in their group, with five wins, one loss and one overtime loss in their seven games. They defeated Switzerland at the quarter-final stage and traditional rivals Finland in their semi-final.

Canada
Round
Sweden
Opponent
Result
Preliminary round
Opponent
Result
Czech Republic
4–1
Game 1
Russia
1–2 (GWS)
Slovenia
7–2
Game 2
Germany
7–2
Belarus
6–0
Game 3
United States
3–4
France
3–2
Game 4
Latvia
2–0
Switzerland
2–3 (OT)
Game 5
Italy
8–1
Norway
5–0
Game 6
Denmark
4–2
Finland
5–2
Game 7
Slovakia
4–2

Team	Pld	W	OTW	OTL	L	GF	GA	GD	Pts
Canada	7	6	0	1	0	32	10	+22	19
Switzerland	7	3	2	2	0	22	14	+8	15
Czech Republic	7	3	2	0	2	23	14	+9	13
Finland	7	2	2	1	2	20	22	−2	11
France	7	2	2	0	3	23	19	+4	10
Norway	7	2	0	2	3	13	19	−6	8
Belarus	7	2	0	1	4	15	27	−12	7
Slovenia	7	0	0	1	6	13	36	−23	1

Source: IIHF
Preliminary

Team	Pld	W	OTW	OTL	L	GF	GA	GD	Pts
United States	7	6	0	0	1	31	14	+17	18
Russia	7	5	1	0	1	35	10	+25	17
Sweden	7	5	0	1	1	29	13	+16	16
Germany	7	2	2	1	2	20	23	−3	11
Latvia	7	3	0	1	3	14	18	−4	10
Denmark	7	1	2	0	4	13	22	−9	7
Slovakia	7	0	1	2	4	12	28	−16	4
Italy	7	0	0	1	6	6	32	−26	1

Source: IIHF
Opponent
Result
Playoff
Opponent
Result
Germany
2–1
Quarterfinals
Switzerland
3–1
Russia
4–2
Semifinals
Finland
4–1

== Match ==
The first period between the two teams was goalless, with Canada managing to kill off two penalties. Sweden opened the scoring with Victor Hedman's short-handed goal shortly before the end of the second period. Canada failed to capitalize from Nicklas Bäckström's penalty for slashing and lost possession. Hedman then sent a backhanded shot past several players towards the Canadian goal, which managed to slide under Calvin Pickard. Canada responded two minutes into the third period by converting a power play. Elias Lindholm was caught high-sticking, and the resulting play allowed Ryan O'Reilly to slot in Mitch Marner's rebounded shot.

The game remained tied after overtime, meaning the game was decided via a five-round shootout. While William Nylander missed the opening penalty shot, Bäckström and Oliver Ekman-Larsson both scored their shots for Sweden. Canada failed to register a goal, with Henrik Lundqvist preventing four attempted penalty shots from converting. The win enabled Sweden to claim their 10th championship title. Nylander was named tournament Most Valuable Player, with seven goals and seven assists in ten games.

21 May 2017; 20:45	Canada	1–2 GWS (0–0, 0–1, 1–0) (OT 0–0) (SO: 0–1)	Sweden	Lanxess Arena, Cologne; Attendance: 17,363

Game reference
Calvin Pickard	Goalies	Henrik Lundqvist	Referees: (Czech Republic) Antonín Jeřábek (Switzerland) Daniel Stricker; Linesmen: (Russia) Alexander Otmakhov (Finland) Sakari Suominen
/ 0–1 / 39:39 – Hedman (SH); O'Reilly (Marner, MacKinnon) (PP) – 41:58 / 1–1			Referees: (Czech Republic) Antonín Jeřábek (Switzerland) Daniel Stricker; Linesmen: (Russia) Alexander Otmakhov (Finland) Sakari Suominen
MacKinnon (miss); Point (miss); O'Reilly (miss); Marner (miss)	Shootout	(miss) Nylander; Bäckström; Ekman-Larsson; (miss) Landeskog	Referees: (Czech Republic) Antonín Jeřábek (Switzerland) Daniel Stricker; Linesmen: (Russia) Alexander Otmakhov (Finland) Sakari Suominen
10 min	Penalties	8 min	Referees: (Czech Republic) Antonín Jeřábek (Switzerland) Daniel Stricker; Linesmen: (Russia) Alexander Otmakhov (Finland) Sakari Suominen
43	Shots	42	Referees: (Czech Republic) Antonín Jeřábek (Switzerland) Daniel Stricker; Linesmen: (Russia) Alexander Otmakhov (Finland) Sakari Suominen
