= 2017 IIHF World Championship playoff round =

The playoff round of the 2017 IIHF World Championship was held from 18 to 21 May 2017. The top four of each preliminary group qualified for the playoff round.

== Format ==
The teams played crossover in the quarterfinals, with Germany in Cologne and France in Paris, if qualified.

== Qualified teams ==
Group	Winners	Runners-up	Third place	Fourth place
A	United States	Russia	Sweden	Germany
B	Canada	Switzerland	Czech Republic	Finland

== Bracket ==
Quarterfinals
18 May - Cologne
United States	0
Finland	2
18 May - Paris
Switzerland	1
Sweden	3
18 May - Cologne
Canada	2
Germany	1
18 May - Paris
Russia	3
Czech Republic	0

Semifinals
20 May - Cologne
Finland	1
Sweden	4
20 May - Cologne
Canada	4
Russia	2

Final
21 May - Cologne
Sweden (GWS)	2
Canada	1
Third place
21 May - Cologne
Russia	5
Finland	3

All times are local (UTC+2).

== Quarterfinals ==
18 May 2017; 16:15	United States	0–2 (0–0, 0–1, 0–1)	Finland	Lanxess Arena, Cologne; Attendance: 8,968

Game reference
Jimmy Howard	Goalies	Harri Säteri	Referees: (Canada) Oliver Gouin (Czech Republic) Antonín Jeřábek; Linesmen: (Russia) Gleb Lazarev (Czech Republic) Miroslav Lhotský
0–1 / 21:01 – Rantanen (Savinainen, Aho) (PP); 0–2 / 46:49 – Kemppainen (J. Aaltonen)			Referees: (Canada) Oliver Gouin (Czech Republic) Antonín Jeřábek; Linesmen: (Russia) Gleb Lazarev (Czech Republic) Miroslav Lhotský
12 min	Penalties	4 min	Referees: (Canada) Oliver Gouin (Czech Republic) Antonín Jeřábek; Linesmen: (Russia) Gleb Lazarev (Czech Republic) Miroslav Lhotský
26	Shots	20	Referees: (Canada) Oliver Gouin (Czech Republic) Antonín Jeřábek; Linesmen: (Russia) Gleb Lazarev (Czech Republic) Miroslav Lhotský

18 May 2017; 16:15	Russia	3–0 (2–0, 0–0, 1–0)	Czech Republic	AccorHotels Arena, Paris; Attendance: 6,209

Game reference

Andrei Vasilevskiy
Goalies
Pavel Francouz
Referees:
(Austria) Mark Lemelin
(Switzerland) Tobias Wehrli
Linesmen:
(United States) Brian Oliver
(Canada) Nathan Vanoosten

Orlov (Plotnikov, Antipin) – 08:45	1–0
Kucherov (Kuznetsov, Antipin) (PP) – 13:36	2–0
Panarin (Kucherov, Kuznetsov) – 53:55	3–0

10 min
Penalties
6 min
26
Shots
27

18 May 2017; 20:15	Canada	2–1 (1–0, 1–0, 0–1)	Germany	Lanxess Arena, Cologne; Attendance: 16,653

Game reference

Calvin Pickard
Goalies
Philipp Grubauer
Referees:
(Czech Republic) Jan Hribik
(Switzerland) Daniel Stricker
Linesmen:
(United States) Judson Ritter
(Finland) Sakari Suominen

Scheifele (O'Reilly, Marner) (PP) – 17:11	1–0
Skinner (Matheson, Scheifele) – 38:08	2–0
	2–1	53:21 – Y. Seidenberg (Ehrhoff) (SH)

8 min
Penalties
18 min
50
Shots
20

18 May 2017; 20:15	Switzerland	1–3 (1–1, 0–1, 0–1)	Sweden	AccorHotels Arena, Paris; Attendance: 8,417

Game reference

Leonardo Genoni
Goalies
Henrik Lundqvist
Referees:
(Canada) Brett Iverson
(Slovakia) Jozef Kubuš
Linesmen:
(Russia) Alexander Otmakhov
(Czech Republic) Libor Suchánek

	0–1	04:15 – Bäckström (Lindberg, Nylander)
Haas – 12:53	1–1
	1–2	33:15 – Nylander (Ekman-Larsson)
	1–3	43:44 – Edler (J. Lundqvist)

2 min
Penalties
6 min
27
Shots
29

== Semifinals ==
20 May 2017; 15:15	Canada	4–2 (0–0, 0–2, 4–0)	Russia	Lanxess Arena, Cologne; Attendance: 16,469

Game reference

Calvin Pickard
Goalies
Andrei Vasilevskiy
Referees:
(Austria) Mark Lemelin
(Switzerland) Daniel Stricker
Linesmen:
(Czech Republic) Miroslav Lhotský
(United States) Brian Oliver

	0–1	32:16 – Kuznetsov (Panarin, Kucherov)
	0–2	34:50 – Gusev (Shipachyov, Panarin) (PP)
Scheifele (MacKinnon, Parayko) (PP) – 40:17	1–2
MacKinnon (Konecny) – 55:07	2–2
O'Reilly (Matheson) – 56:58	3–2
Couturier (O'Reilly, Parayko) (ENG) – 58:53	4–2

10 min
Penalties
22 min
38
Shots
28

20 May 2017; 19:15	Sweden	4–1 (1–1, 2–0, 1–0)	Finland	Lanxess Arena, Cologne; Attendance: 11,242

Game reference

Henrik Lundqvist
Goalies
Harri Säteri
Referees:
(Czech Republic) Jan Hribik
(Czech Republic) Antonín Jeřábek
Linesmen:
(Russia) Alexander Otmakhov
(Canada) Nathan Vanoosten

Edler (Bäckström) – 01:49	1–0
	1–1	04:45 – Kemppainen (Aaltonen)
J. Klingberg (Ekman-Larsson, Nylander) (PP) – 24:36	2–1
Nylander (Bäckström) (PP) – 34:52	3–1
Nordström (Krüger) – 53:52	4–1

6 min
Penalties
10 min
41
Shots
23

== Bronze medal game ==
21 May 2017; 16:15	Russia	5–3 (1–0, 3–1, 1–2)	Finland	Lanxess Arena, Cologne; Attendance: 16,182

Game reference

Andrei Vasilevskiy
Goalies
Joonas Korpisalo
Harri Säteri
Referees:
(Canada) Oliver Gouin
(Canada) Brett Iverson
Linesmen:
(Czech Republic) Miroslav Lhotský
(United States) Brian Oliver

Gusev (Antipin, Nichushkin) – 06:58	1–0
Tkachyov (Nichushkin, Zub) (SH) – 21:48	2–0
Gusev (Panarin, Dadonov) (PP) – 27:01	3–0
Kiselevich (Namestnikov, Nichushkin) – 28:16	4–0
	4–1	39:33 – Rantanen (Filppula)
	4–2	41:16 – Lehtonen (Aho)
	4–3	45:29 – Savinainen (Rantanen, Aho) (PP)
Kucherov (Gusev, Belov) – 49:49	5–3

8 min
Penalties
10 min
30
Shots
29

== Gold medal game ==
21 May 2017; 20:45	Canada	1–2 GWS (0–0, 0–1, 1–0) (OT 0–0) (SO: 0–1)	Sweden	Lanxess Arena, Cologne; Attendance: 17,363

Game reference
Calvin Pickard	Goalies	Henrik Lundqvist	Referees: (Czech Republic) Antonín Jeřábek (Switzerland) Daniel Stricker; Linesmen: (Russia) Alexander Otmakhov (Finland) Sakari Suominen
/ 0–1 / 39:39 – Hedman (SH); O'Reilly (Marner, MacKinnon) (PP) – 41:58 / 1–1			Referees: (Czech Republic) Antonín Jeřábek (Switzerland) Daniel Stricker; Linesmen: (Russia) Alexander Otmakhov (Finland) Sakari Suominen
MacKinnon (miss); Point (miss); O'Reilly (miss); Marner (miss)	Shootout	(miss) Nylander; Bäckström; Ekman-Larsson; (miss) Landeskog	Referees: (Czech Republic) Antonín Jeřábek (Switzerland) Daniel Stricker; Linesmen: (Russia) Alexander Otmakhov (Finland) Sakari Suominen
10 min	Penalties	8 min	Referees: (Czech Republic) Antonín Jeřábek (Switzerland) Daniel Stricker; Linesmen: (Russia) Alexander Otmakhov (Finland) Sakari Suominen
43	Shots	42	Referees: (Czech Republic) Antonín Jeřábek (Switzerland) Daniel Stricker; Linesmen: (Russia) Alexander Otmakhov (Finland) Sakari Suominen
