= 2017 IIHF World Championship Group B =

Ice hockey tournament group stage

Group B was one of two groups of the 2017 IIHF World Championship. The four best placed teams advanced to the playoff round, while the last placed team was relegated to Division I in 2018.

== Standings ==
Pos	Team	Pld	W	OTW	OTL	L	GF	GA	GD	Pts	Qualification or relegation
1	Canada	7	6	0	1	0	32	10	+22	19	Playoff round
2	Switzerland	7	3	2	2	0	22	14	+8	15	Playoff round
3	Czech Republic	7	3	2	0	2	23	14	+9	13	Playoff round
4	Finland	7	2	2	1	2	20	22	−2	11	Playoff round
5	France (H)	7	2	2	0	3	23	19	+4	10	
6	Norway	7	2	0	2	3	13	19	−6	8	
7	Belarus	7	2	0	1	4	15	27	−12	7	
8	Slovenia (R)	7	0	0	1	6	13	36	−23	1	Relegation to Division I A

Source: IIHF
Rules for classification: 1) points; 2) head-to-head points; 3) head-to-head goal difference; 4) head-to-head number of goals scored; 5) result against closest best-ranked team outside tied teams; 6) result against second-best ranked team outside tied teams; 7) seeding before tournament.
(H) Host; (R) Relegated

All times are local (UTC+2).

== Matches ==
=== Finland vs Belarus ===
5 May 2017; 16:15	Finland	3–2 (2–0, 0–1, 1–1)	Belarus	AccorHotels Arena, Paris; Attendance: 5,078

Game reference

Joonas Korpisalo
Goalies
Kevin Lalande
Referees:
(Czech Republic) Jan Hribik
(Germany) Daniel Piechaczek
Linesmen:
(Denmark) Rene Jensen
(Sweden) Andreas Malmqvist

Aho (Filppula) – 02:43	1–0
Osala – 05:09	2–0
	2–1	38:08 – Sharangovich (Stefanovich)
	2–2	44:32 – Kovyrshin (Hrabarenka, A. Kostitsyn)
Savinainen (Rantanen, Aho) (PP) – 49:15	3–2

4 min
Penalties
6 min
24
Shots
24

=== Czech Republic vs Canada ===
5 May 2017; 20:15	Czech Republic	1–4 (0–1, 0–1, 1–2)	Canada	AccorHotels Arena, Paris; Attendance: 8,834

Game reference

Petr Mrázek
Goalies
Calvin Pickard
Referees:
(Finland) Stefan Fonselius
(United States) Stephen Reneau
Linesmen:
(Russia) Gleb Lazarev
(United States) Judson Ritter

	0–1	06:09 – O'Reilly (Scheifele, Barrie)
	0–2	20:55 – Matheson (Skinner, Giroux) (PP)
Radil (Kovář, Voráček) (PP) – 52:41	1–2
	1–3	54:50 – Barrie (Konecny, Giroux)
	1–4	59:18 – Skinner (ENG)

6 min
Penalties
10 min
29
Shots
28

=== Switzerland vs Slovenia ===
6 May 2017; 12:15	Switzerland	5–4 GWS (4–0, 0–1, 0–3) (OT: 0–0) (SO: 1–0)	Slovenia	AccorHotels Arena, Paris; Attendance: 4,922

Game reference

Jonas Hiller
Goalies
Gašper Krošelj
Matija Pintarič
Referees:
(Czech Republic) Jan Hribik
(Sweden) Marcus Linde
Linesmen:
(United States) Judson Ritter
(Slovakia) Peter Šefčík

Ambühl (Suter) (PP) – 10:49	1–0
Haas (Praplan, Genazzi) – 11:01	2–0
Loeffel (Hollenstein, Praplan) – 16:59	3–0
Bodenmann (Brunner, Richard) – 17:47	4–0
	4–1	38:31 – Muršak (Tavželj) (SH)
	4–2	45:50 – Jeglič (Sabolič, Kranjc)
	4–3	54:02 – Urbas (Ograjenšek, Pretnar) (PP2)
	4–4	55:23 – Sabolič (Tičar) (PP)

Brunner
Hollenstein (miss)
Richard (miss)
Shootout
(miss) Sabolič
(miss) Tičar
(miss) Muršak
16 min
Penalties
10 min
33
Shots
23

=== Belarus vs Czech Republic ===
6 May 2017; 16:15	Belarus	1–6 (0–2, 1–1, 0–3)	Czech Republic	AccorHotels Arena, Paris; Attendance: 6,635

Game reference

Kevin Lalande
Mikhail Karnaukhov
Goalies
Pavel Francouz
Referees:
(Canada) Brett Iverson
(Austria) Mark Lemelin
Linesmen:
(Denmark) Rene Jensen
(Germany) Lukas Kohlmüller

	0–1	13:16 – Vrána (Birner, Řepík)
	0–2	17:30 – Gudas (Voráček)
Pavlovich (Lisovets, Denisov) – 21:13	1–2
	1–3	35:38 – Červenka (Horák, Jeřábek)
	1–4	47:26 – Šimek (Voráček, Radil) (PP)
	1–5	49:37 – Voráček (Pastrňák, Kundrátek)
	1–6	59:44 – Kempný (Hanzl, Zohorna)

16 min
Penalties
12 min
7
Shots
45

=== Norway vs France ===
6 May 2017; 20:15	Norway	3–2 (0–0, 2–1, 1–1)	France	AccorHotels Arena, Paris; Attendance: 7,893

Game reference

Lars Haugen
Goalies
Cristobal Huet
Referees:
(Germany) Daniel Piechaczek
(Switzerland) Tobias Wehrli
Linesmen:
(Czech Republic) Miroslav Lhotský
(Finland) Sakari Suominen

K. Olimb (M. Olimb, Thoresen) – 25:13	1–0
Thoresen (M. Olimb, K. Olimb) (PP) – 29:40	2–0
	2–1	38:14 – S. Da Costa (Fleury)
Thoresen (Reichenberg) – 49:49	3–1
	3–2	49:59 – S. Da Costa (Auvitu, Besch)

10 min
Penalties
12 min
24
Shots
24

=== Slovenia vs Canada ===
7 May 2017; 12:15	Slovenia	2–7 (0–3, 1–3, 1–1)	Canada	AccorHotels Arena, Paris; Attendance: 9,128

Game reference

Gašper Krošelj
Goalies
Chad Johnson
Referees:
(Austria) Mark Lemelin
(Switzerland) Tobias Wehrli
Linesmen:
(Germany) Lukas Kohlmüller
(Sweden) Andreas Malmqvist

	0–1	04:30 – Barrie (Simmonds, Konecny)
	0–2	14:36 – MacKinnon (Skinner, Barrie)
	0–3	16:14 – Point (Konecny)
	0–4	24:44 – MacKinnon (Giroux, de Haan)
	0–5	25:43 – MacKinnon (Marner, Barrie) (PP)
Muršak (Sabolič, Pretnar) – 35:44	1–5
	1–6	37:11 – Marner (Konecny)
	1–7	47:07 – Skinner (MacKinnon, Barrie)
Urbas (Kranjc, Pretnar) (EA) – 57:55	2–7

8 min
Penalties
8 min
14
Shots
51

=== Finland vs France ===
7 May 2017; 16:15	Finland	1–5 (0–1, 1–2, 0–2)	France	AccorHotels Arena, Paris; Attendance: 11,433

Game reference

Joonas Korpisalo
Goalies
Florian Hardy
Referees:
(Canada) Brett Iverson
(Sweden) Marcus Linde
Linesmen:
(Russia) Gleb Lazarev
(Slovakia) Peter Šefčík

	0–1	14:17 – Bellemare (Rech, Meunier)
Lehtonen (Pihlström, Rantanen) – 21:33	1–1
	1–2	33:58 – Roussel (Bellemare)
	1–3	38:49 – Claireaux (Janil, Rech) (PP)
	1–4	48:27 – Roussel (Rech)
	1–5	57:49 – Fleury (T. Da Costa) (ENG)

8 min
Penalties
20 min
43
Shots
26

=== Norway vs Switzerland ===
7 May 2017; 20:15	Norway	0–3 (0–0, 0–2, 0–1)	Switzerland	AccorHotels Arena, Paris; Attendance: 7,782

Game reference

Henrik Haukeland
Goalies
Leonardo Genoni
Referees:
(Finland) Stefan Fonselius
(United States) Stephen Reneau
Linesmen:
(Czech Republic) Miroslav Lhotský
(Finland) Sakari Suominen

0–1	32:04 – Schäppi (Loeffel, Almond)
0–2	34:00 – Almond (Rüfenacht, Untersander)
0–3	49:37 – Suter (Almond, Ambühl) (PP)

12 min
Penalties
8 min
20
Shots
38

=== Belarus vs Canada ===
8 May 2017; 16:15	Belarus	0–6 (0–1, 0–2, 0–3)	Canada	AccorHotels Arena, Paris; Attendance: 4,363

Game reference

Mikhail Karnaukhov
Goalies
Calvin Pickard
Referees:
(Finland) Stefan Fonselius
(Czech Republic) Jan Hribik
Linesmen:
(Denmark) Rene Jensen
(Russia) Gleb Lazarev

0–1	05:08 – Point (Marner, Konecny)
0–2	24:20 – MacKinnon (Marner, Barrie) (PP)
0–3	35:21 – MacKinnon (Skinner, Giroux)
0–4	47:01 – Skinner (MacKinnon, Matheson)
0–5	50:16 – Giroux (Skinner, Morrissey)
0–6	54:42 – Point (Konecny, Vlasic)

12 min
Penalties
6 min
13
Shots
45

=== Finland vs Czech Republic ===
8 May 2017; 20:15	Finland	3–4 GWS (3–0, 0–0, 0–3) (OT 0–0) (SO: 0–1)	Czech Republic	AccorHotels Arena, Paris; Attendance: 8,112

Game reference

Joonas Korpisalo
Goalies
Petr Mrázek
Referees:
(Germany) Daniel Piechaczek
(United States) Stephen Reneau
Linesmen:
(Sweden) Andreas Malmqvist
(United States) Judson Ritter

Filppula (Aho, Rantanen) – 00:58	1–0
Jaakola (Rantanen, Filppula) – 02:41	2–0
V. Lajunen (Pihlström, J. Aaltonen) – 13:51	3–0
	3–1	47:37 – Horák (Pastrňák, Červenka) (PP)
	3–2	57:46 – Gudas (Krejčík, Řepík)
	3–3	58:09 – Kovář (Pastrňák)

Puljujärvi (miss)
Aho (miss)
Rantanen (miss)
Shootout
Hanzl
(miss) Hyka
20 min
Penalties
6 min
21
Shots
34

=== Slovenia vs Norway ===
9 May 2017; 16:15	Slovenia	1–5 (0–3, 1–1, 0–1)	Norway	AccorHotels Arena, Paris; Attendance: 2,696

Game reference

Matija Pintarič
Gašper Krošelj
Goalies
Lars Haugen
Referees:
(Russia) Roman Gofman
(Czech Republic) Antonín Jeřábek
Linesmen:
(Czech Republic) Miroslav Lhotský
(Slovakia) Peter Šefčík

	0–1	05:57 – M. Olimb (Thoresen, K. Olimb)
	0–2	14:35 – K. Olimb (Thoresen, Nørstebø)
	0–3	18:20 – Forsberg
	0–4	38:58 – Reichenberg (Holøs, Haugen) (PP)
Sabolič (Podlipnik, Vidmar) – 39:45	1–4
	1–5	59:17 – Thoresen (K. Olimb, Bonsaksen)

6 min
Penalties
10 min
16
Shots
23

=== Switzerland vs France ===
9 May 2017; 20:15	Switzerland	3–4 GWS (0–1, 2–0, 1–2) (OT: 0–0) (SO: 0–1)	France	AccorHotels Arena, Paris; Attendance: 6,747

Game reference

Leonardo Genoni
Goalies
Cristobal Huet
Referees:
(Latvia) Eduards Odiņš
(Sweden) Linus Öhlund
Linesmen:
(Germany) Lukas Kohlmüller
(Finland) Sakari Suominen

	0–1	02:53 – Auvitu (Perret) (SH)
Praplan (Hollenstein, Loeffel) – 21:22	1–1
Praplan (Hollenstein, Haas) – 23:48	2–1
	2–2	43:02 – S. Da Costa (Auvitu) (PP)
Ambühl (Suter, Untersander) – 53:41	3–2
	3–3	55:41 – Rech (Meunier)

Brunner (miss)
Praplan (miss)
Hollenstein (miss)
Shootout
(miss) Fleury
S. Da Costa
(miss) Bellemare
12 min
Penalties
12 min
26
Shots
25

=== Switzerland vs Belarus ===
10 May 2017; 16:15	Switzerland	3–0 (1–0, 1–0, 1–0)	Belarus	AccorHotels Arena, Paris; Attendance: 3,212

Game reference

Leonardo Genoni
Goalies
Kevin Lalande
Referees:
(Russia) Roman Gofman
(Finland) Anssi Salonen
Linesmen:
(Finland) Hannu Sormunen
(Czech Republic) Libor Suchánek

Schäppi (Untersander, Genazzi) (PP) – 17:54	1–0
Ambühl (Hollenstein, Loeffel) – 35:29	2–0
Almond (Schäppi) – 47:55	3–0

6 min
Penalties
10 min
23
Shots
14

=== Finland vs Slovenia ===
10 May 2017; 20:15	Finland	5–2 (0–1, 2–0, 3–1)	Slovenia	AccorHotels Arena, Paris; Attendance: 3,436

Game reference

Harri Säteri
Goalies
Gašper Krošelj
Referees:
(Sweden) Linus Öhlund
(Switzerland) Daniel Stricker
Linesmen:
(Switzerland) Roman Kaderli
(Canada) Nathan Vanoosten

	0–1	14:21 – Kuralt (Pem)
Savinainen (Sallinen) – 24:06	1–1
Rantanen (Savinainen, Aho) (PP) – 25:51	2–1
	2–2	45:50 – Tičar (Sabolič) (PP)
Aho (Rantanen) – 49:30	3–2
Hännikäinen (J. Lajunen) – 50:34	4–2
Sallinen (Pyörälä, Järvinen) (ENG) – 59:15	5–2

4 min
Penalties
6 min
49
Shots
14

=== Czech Republic vs Norway ===
11 May 2017; 16:15	Czech Republic	1–0 OT (0–0, 0–0, 0–0) (OT: 1–0)	Norway	AccorHotels Arena, Paris; Attendance: 6,381

Game reference
Pavel Francouz	Goalies	Lars Haugen	Referees: (Canada) Oliver Gouin (Switzerland) Daniel Stricker; Linesmen: (United States) Brian Oliver (Russia) Alexander Otmakhov
Kovář (Pastrňák, Jeřábek) – 61:25 / 1–0			Referees: (Canada) Oliver Gouin (Switzerland) Daniel Stricker; Linesmen: (United States) Brian Oliver (Russia) Alexander Otmakhov
8 min	Penalties	4 min	Referees: (Canada) Oliver Gouin (Switzerland) Daniel Stricker; Linesmen: (United States) Brian Oliver (Russia) Alexander Otmakhov
32	Shots	10	Referees: (Canada) Oliver Gouin (Switzerland) Daniel Stricker; Linesmen: (United States) Brian Oliver (Russia) Alexander Otmakhov

=== Canada vs France ===
11 May 2017; 20:15	Canada	3–2 (1–1, 1–1, 1–0)	France	AccorHotels Arena, Paris; Attendance: 14,510

Game reference

Chad Johnson
Goalies
Florian Hardy
Referees:
(Czech Republic) Antonín Jeřábek
(Slovakia) Jozef Kubuš
Linesmen:
(Belarus) Ivan Dedyulya
(Switzerland) Roman Kaderli

O'Reilly (MacKinnon, Scheifele) (PP) – 05:19	1–0
	1–1	09:00 – Dame-Malka (Rech, Ritz)
	1–2	21:37 – Fleury (S. Da Costa, Auvitu) (PP)
Giroux (Lee) (PP) – 39:11	2–2
Vlasic – 42:22	3–2

33 min
Penalties
10 min
35
Shots
24

=== Czech Republic vs Slovenia ===
12 May 2017; 16:15	Czech Republic	5–1 (3–0, 1–0, 1–1)	Slovenia	AccorHotels Arena, Paris; Attendance: 2,805

Game reference

Petr Mrázek
Goalies
Gašper Krošelj
Referees:
(Russia) Roman Gofman
(Finland) Anssi Salonen
Linesmen:
(United States) Brian Oliver
(Canada) Nathan Vanoosten

Řepík (Kovář, Červenka) (PP) – 02:12	1–0
Horák (Pastrňák, Voráček) (PP) – 08:20	2–0
Horák (Gudas, Šimek) – 11:46	3–0
Kempný (Vrána) – 22:09	4–0
	4–1	44:04 – Verlič (Muršak, Urbas)
Červenka (Kovář) – 47:15	5–1

8 min
Penalties
6 min
37
Shots
15

=== France vs Belarus ===
12 May 2017; 20:15	France	4–3 GWS (1–0, 1–2, 1–1) (OT 0–0) (SO: 1–0)	Belarus	AccorHotels Arena, Paris; Attendance: 6,802

Game reference

Cristobal Huet
Goalies
Kevin Lalande
Referees:
(Latvia) Eduards Odiņš
(Sweden) Linus Öhlund
Linesmen:
(Netherlands) Joep Leermakers
(Czech Republic) Libor Suchánek

Treille (T. Da Costa, Raux) – 12:29	1–0
Fleury (Roussel, S. Da Costa) (PP) – 20:54	2–0
	2–1	26:40 – Pavlovich (Sharangovich, Vorobey)
	2–2	37:47 – Sharangovich (Linglet)
	2–3	41:20 – Kulakov (S. Kostitsyn, Demkov) (PP)
Bellemare (S. Da Costa) – 52:35	3–3

Roussel (miss)
Fleury (miss)
S. Da Costa
S. Da Costa
Shootout
Stefanovich
(miss) Stas
(miss) Pavlovich
(miss) Stefanovich
12 min
Penalties
10 min
31
Shots
22

=== Norway vs Finland ===
13 May 2017; 12:15	Norway	2–3 OT (1–0, 0–2, 1–0) (OT: 0–1)	Finland	AccorHotels Arena, Paris; Attendance: 8,108

Game reference

Lars Haugen
Goalies
Joonas Korpisalo
Referees:
(Czech Republic) Antonín Jeřábek
(Slovakia) Jozef Kubuš
Linesmen:
(Belarus) Ivan Dedyulya
(Russia) Alexander Otmakhov

Bastiansen (Nørstebø) (PP) – 18:38	1–0
	1–1	25:33 – Hietanen (Aho, V. Lajunen) (PP)
	1–2	28:11 – Honka (Ohtamaa, Hännikäinen)
Martinsen (Roest) (EA) – 59:31	2–2
	2–3	61:55 – Hännikäinen (Pyörälä)

12 min
Penalties
24 min
21
Shots
28

=== Slovenia vs Belarus ===
13 May 2017; 16:15	Slovenia	2–5 (2–1, 0–4, 0–0)	Belarus	AccorHotels Arena, Paris; Attendance: 7,158

Game reference

Gašper Krošelj
Goalies
Kevin Lalande
Referees:
(Canada) Oliver Gouin
(Switzerland) Daniel Stricker
Linesmen:
(Switzerland) Roman Kaderli
(Canada) Nathan Vanoosten

	0–1	13:12 – Pavlovich (Shinkevich, Linglet)
Jeglič (Verlič, Sabolič) (PP) – 16:52	1–1
Rodman (Kovačević, Pretnar) – 19:15	2–1
	2–2	20:29 – Kovyrshin (A. Kostitsyn, S. Kostitsyn)
	2–3	29:48 – Pavlovich (Shinkevich)
	2–4	38:05 – Shinkevich (Pavlovich, Linglet)
	2–5	39:43 – Stas (Stefanovich) (PP)

20 min
Penalties
10 min
30
Shots
29

=== Canada vs Switzerland ===
13 May 2017; 20:15	Canada	2–3 OT (2–0, 0–0, 0–2) (OT: 0–1)	Switzerland	AccorHotels Arena, Paris; Attendance: 12,932

Game reference

Calvin Pickard
Goalies
Jonas Hiller
Leonardo Genoni
Referees:
(Latvia) Eduards Odiņš
(Finland) Anssi Salonen
Linesmen:
(Netherlands) Joep Leermakers
(Finland) Hannu Sormunen

O'Reilly (Marner, Parayko) (PP) – 04:22	1–0
Marner (Lee, Konecny) – 06:28	2–0
	2–1	46:37 – Herzog (Praplan, Richard) (PP)
	2–2	49:44 – Praplan (Hollenstein)
	2–3	63:40 – Herzog (Untersander, Ambühl)

8 min
Penalties
6 min
45
Shots
26

=== France vs Czech Republic ===
14 May 2017; 16:15	France	2–5 (0–1, 1–2, 1–2)	Czech Republic	AccorHotels Arena, Paris; Attendance: 13,003

Game reference

Florian Hardy
Goalies
Pavel Francouz
Referees:
(Canada) Oliver Gouin
(Slovakia) Jozef Kubuš
Linesmen:
(Russia) Alexander Otmakhov
(Finland) Hannu Sormunen

	0–1	08:32 – Pastrňák (Horák, Voráček) (PP)
S. Da Costa (Fleury) (PP) – 20:53	1–1
	1–2	26:52 – Řepík (Kundrátek)
	1–3	37:01 – Rutta (Červenka) (PP)
	1–4	48:03 – Řepík (Kempný)
Roussel – 50:38	2–4
	2–5	58:56 – Zohorna (Horák) (ENG)

6 min
Penalties
14 min
24
Shots
28

=== Switzerland vs Finland ===
14 May 2017; 20:15	Switzerland	2–3 OT (2–1, 0–0, 0–1) (OT: 0–1)	Finland	AccorHotels Arena, Paris; Attendance: 10,860

Game reference

Leonardo Genoni
Goalies
Joonas Korpisalo
Harri Säteri
Referees:
(Russia) Roman Gofman
(Sweden) Linus Öhlund
Linesmen:
(Belarus) Ivan Dedyulya
(Czech Republic) Libor Suchánek

Herzog (Richard, Untersander) – 04:40	1–0
Genazzi (Loeffel) – 10:30	2–0
	2–1	19:01 – Hietanen (Savinainen, Aho) (PP)
	2–2	47:40 – Rantanen (V. Lajunen, Aho) (PP)
	2–3	62:24 – Filppula (Savinainen, Hietanen)

20 min
Penalties
12 min
27
Shots
27

=== Canada vs Norway ===
15 May 2017; 16:15	Canada	5–0 (2–0, 2–0, 1–0)	Norway	AccorHotels Arena, Paris; Attendance: 5,093

Game reference

Chad Johnson
Goalies
Henrik Haukeland
Steffen Søberg
Referees:
(Russia) Roman Gofman
(Sweden) Marcus Linde
Linesmen:
(Switzerland) Roman Kaderli
(Czech Republic) Libor Suchánek

Schenn (Simmonds) (PP) – 17:48	1–0
Parayko (MacKinnon, O'Reilly) (PP) – 18:42	2–0
Scheifele (Matheson, Skinner) – 34:57	3–0
Parayko (MacKinnon, Marner) (PP) – 38:14	4–0
O'Reilly (Scheifele, MacKinnon) (PP) – 57:20	5–0

8 min
Penalties
10 min
48
Shots
10

=== France vs Slovenia ===
15 May 2017; 20:15	France	4–1 (0–0, 2–0, 2–1)	Slovenia	AccorHotels Arena, Paris; Attendance: 12,807

Game reference

Cristobal Huet
Florian Hardy
Goalies
Matija Pintarič
Referees:
(Canada) Brett Iverson
(Austria) Mark Lemelin
Linesmen:
(Netherlands) Joep Leermakers
(United States) Brian Oliver

Roussel (Auvitu, S. Da Costa) (PP) – 28:20	1–0
Auvitu (Bellemare, Roussel) – 31:08	2–0
Roussel (Auvitu) (PP2) – 44:01	3–0
	3–1	44:25 – Muršak (Mušič, Pintarič) (SH)
Roussel (SH, ENG) – 58:30	4–1

4 min
Penalties
6 min
25
Shots
27

=== Belarus vs Norway ===
16 May 2017; 12:15	Belarus	4–3 (0–0, 2–1, 2–2)	Norway	AccorHotels Arena, Paris; Attendance: 3,867

Game reference

Mikhail Karnaukhov
Goalies
Lars Haugen
Referees:
(Germany) Daniel Piechaczek
(Switzerland) Tobias Wehrli
Linesmen:
(Netherlands) Joep Leermakers
(Canada) Nathan Vanoosten

Lisovets (Stefanovich) – 26:08	1–0
	1–1	35:05 – Sørvik (M. Olimb)
Kulakov (Stas, Demkov) – 37:52	2–1
	2–2	41:19 – Reichenberg (Thoresen, Ødegaard)
	2–3	43:41 – Holøs (Martinsen, M. Olimb)
Shinkevich (Kovyrshin, Stefanovich) – 54:06	3–3
Lisovets (Pavlovich, Linglet) – 56:56	4–3

6 min
Penalties
4 min
19
Shots
26

=== Czech Republic vs Switzerland ===
16 May 2017; 16:15	Czech Republic	1–3 (0–1, 1–1, 0–1)	Switzerland	AccorHotels Arena, Paris; Attendance: 4,531

Game reference

Petr Mrázek
Goalies
Niklas Schlegel
Referees:
(Slovakia) Jozef Kubuš
(Sweden) Marcus Linde
Linesmen:
(Belarus) Ivan Dedyulya
(Finland) Hannu Sormunen

	0–1	01:42 – Praplan (Diaz)
	0–2	28:36 – Suri (Kukan, Schlumpf)
Červenka (Pastrňák, Šulák) – 34:08	1–2
	1–3	52:09 – Brunner (Richard, Marti)

2 min
Penalties
6 min
24
Shots
21

=== Canada vs Finland ===
16 May 2017; 20:15	Canada	5–2 (3–1, 1–1, 1–0)	Finland	AccorHotels Arena, Paris; Attendance: 10,202

Game reference

Calvin Pickard
Goalies
Harri Säteri
Referees:
(Austria) Mark Lemelin
(United States) Stephen Reneau
Linesmen:
(United States) Brian Oliver
(Russia) Alexander Otmakhov

Marner (Point, Matheson) – 02:46	1–0
	1–1	03:08 – J. Lajunen (Osala)
Parayko (Marner) (PP) – 04:06	2–1
Marner (Scheifele, MacKinnon) (PP) – 13:45	3–1
Point (Matheson, Parayko) – 28:09	4–1
	4–2	36:51 – Ohtamaa (Honka, Kemppainen)
Duchene (Couturier) – 40:34	5–2

10 min
Penalties
20 min
28
Shots
20
