= Tommaso Traversa =

Italian ice hockey player

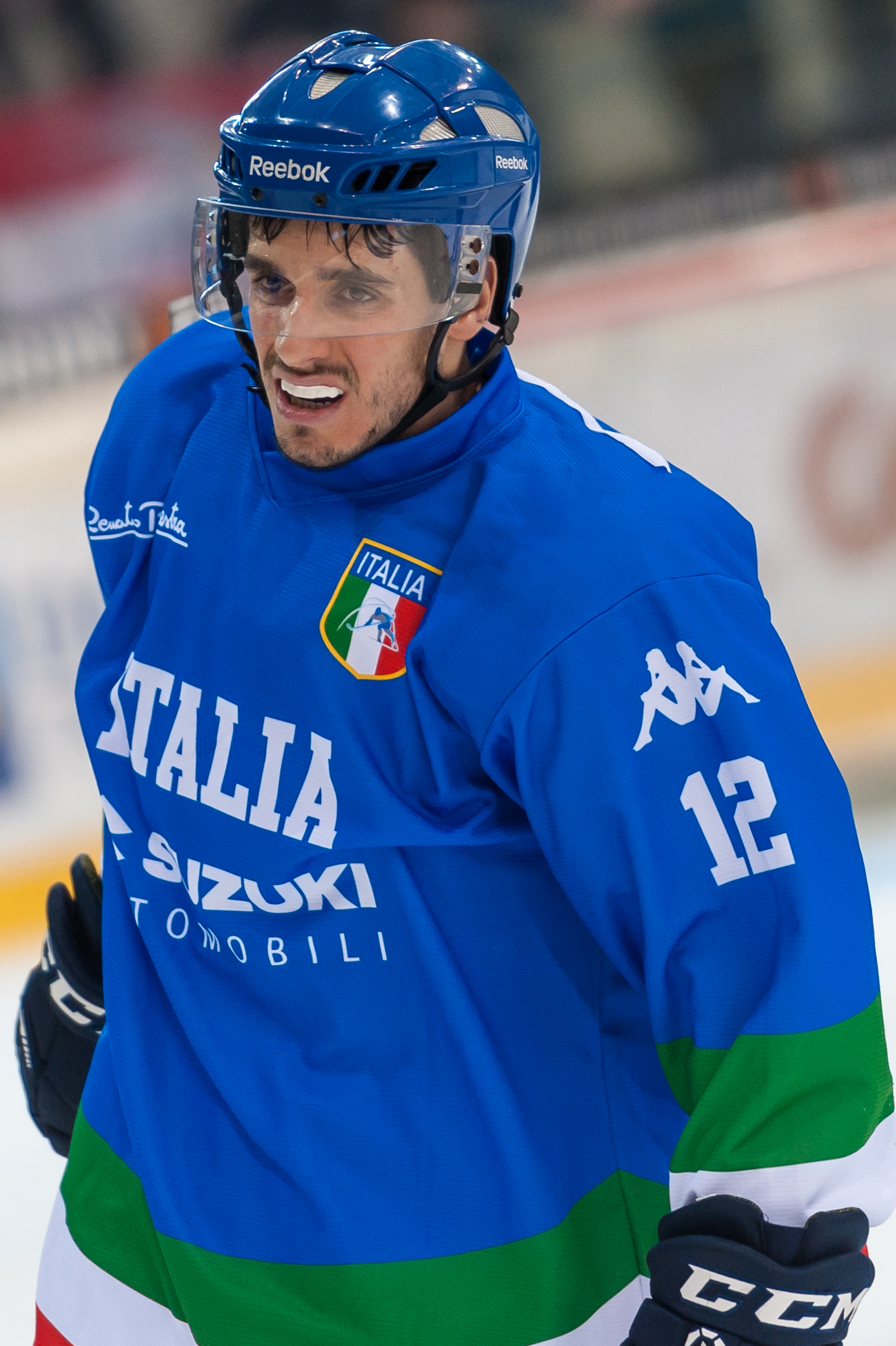
- Born: 4 August 1990 (age 35) Turin, Italy
- Height: 5 ft 7 in (170 cm)
- Weight: 170 lb (77 kg; 12 st 2 lb)
- Position: Forward
- Shoots: Left
- AlpsHL team Former teams: SG Cortina; HC Valpellice; HC All Stars Piemonte; Real Torino HC; Dundee Stars; Alaska Aces; Ritten Sport; HC Pustertal Wölfe; Sheffield Steelers
- National team: Italy
- Playing career: 2006–present

Tommaso Traversa (born 4 August 1990) is an Italian ice hockey player for Alps Hockey League (AlpsHL) side SG Cortina and the Italian national team.

He participated at the 2017 IIHF World Championship.
