= Dennis Seidenberg =

German ice hockey player (born 1981)

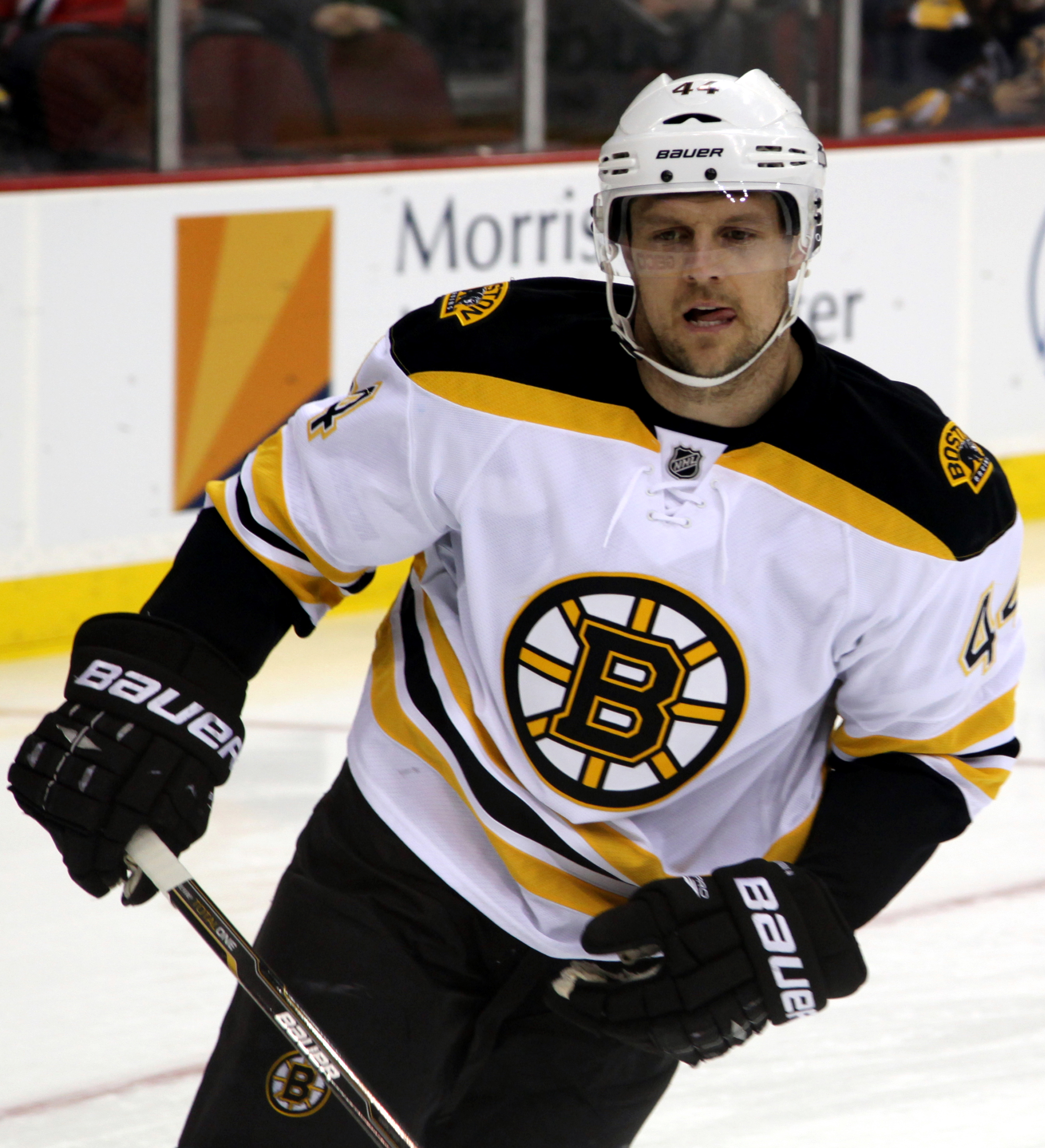
- Seidenberg with the Boston Bruins in January 2012
- Born: 18 July 1981 (age 45) Villingen-Schwenningen, West Germany
- Height: 6 ft 1 in (185 cm)
- Weight: 210 lb (95 kg; 15 st 0 lb)
- Position: Defence
- Shot: Left
- Played for: Adler Mannheim; Philadelphia Flyers; Phoenix Coyotes; Carolina Hurricanes; Florida Panthers; Boston Bruins; New York Islanders
- National team: Germany
- NHL draft: 172nd overall, 2001; Philadelphia Flyers
- Playing career: 1999–2018

Dennis Marvin Seidenberg (born 18 July 1981) is a German former professional ice hockey defenceman who played in the National Hockey League (NHL) for Philadelphia Flyers, Phoenix Coyotes, Carolina Hurricanes, Florida Panthers, New York Islanders, and Boston Bruins, with whom he won the Stanley Cup in 2011. His younger brother Yannic played for EHC Red Bull München in the DEL.

== Playing career ==
As a youth, Seidenberg played in the 1994 and 1995 Quebec International Pee-Wee Hockey Tournaments with a team from Baden-Württemberg.

=== Philadelphia Flyers ===
Seidenberg was drafted in the sixth round, 172nd overall, by the Philadelphia Flyers in the 2001 NHL entry draft. After spending three years with Adler Mannheim of the Deutsche Eishockey Liga (DEL) in his native Germany, he signed with the Flyers in 2002. Seidenberg spent the next two seasons bouncing between the NHL team and the American Hockey League (AHL)'s Philadelphia Phantoms, but played the entire 2004–05 season with the Phantoms during the lockout, winning the 2005 Calder Cup.

=== Phoenix Coyotes/Carolina Hurricanes ===
In both seasons after the lockout, Seidenberg was involved in a mid-season trade. On 20 January 2006, Seidenberg was sent to the Phoenix Coyotes for Petr Nedvěd; the following year, the Coyotes sent Seidenberg to the Carolina Hurricanes on 8 January in exchange for center Kevyn Adams.

=== Florida Panthers ===
On 14 September 2009, he signed a one-year, $2.25 million contract with the Florida Panthers.

=== Boston Bruins ===
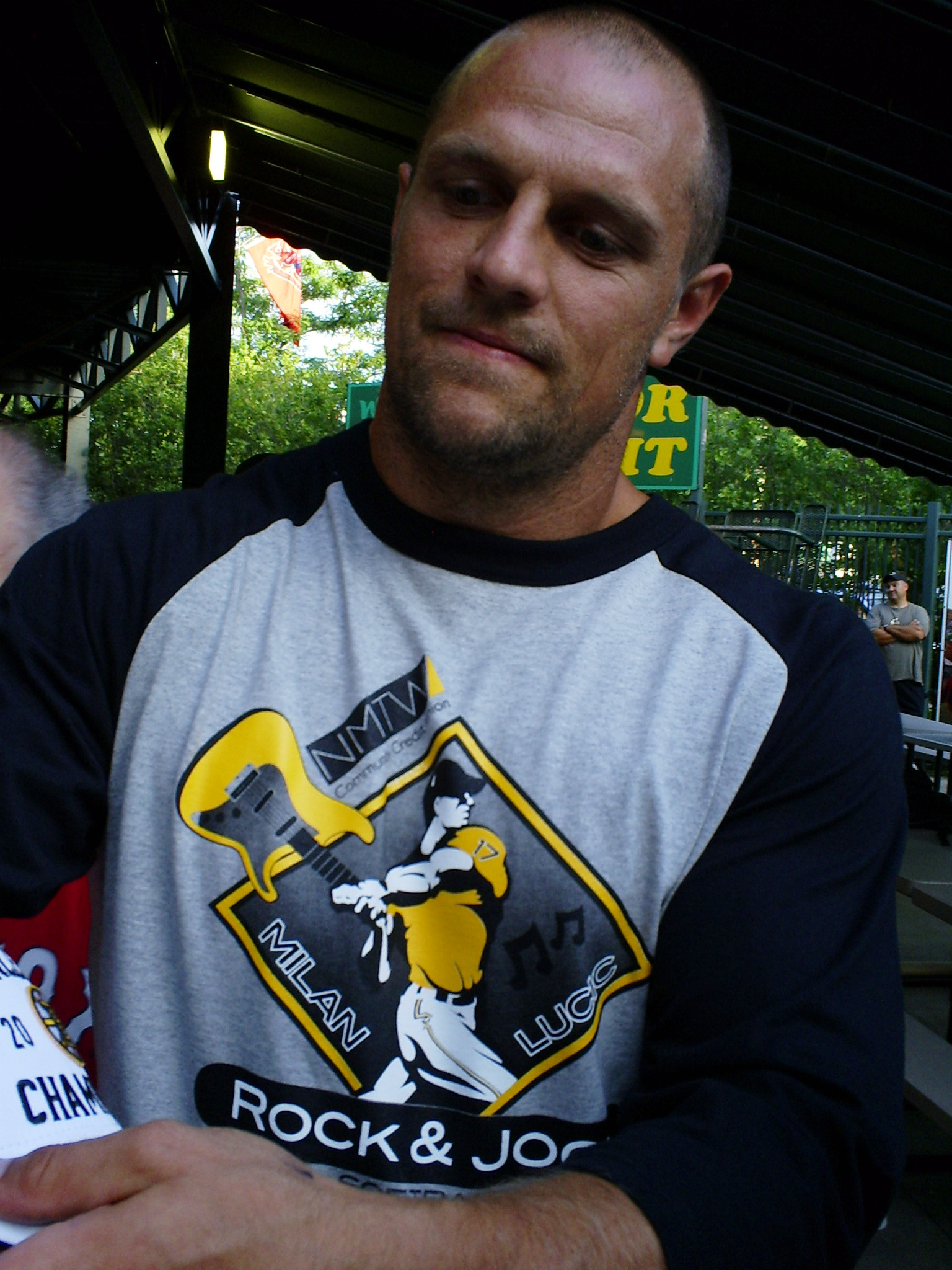
Seidenberg in 2011 at a charity softball game

On 3 March 2010, Seidenberg and Matt Bartkowski were traded to the Boston Bruins for Byron Bitz, Craig Weller, and a second round draft pick. In June 2010, Seidenberg was re-signed by Boston to a four-year contract worth $13 million.

In 2010–11, Seidenberg had a career-high 32 points during the regular season. He then had 11 points in the playoffs to help the Bruins win the Stanley Cup. Seidenberg drew attention for his outstanding play during the playoffs, at one point being cited as a potential Conn Smythe Trophy winner. He is the second German-born player to win the Stanley Cup, following his favorite player growing up, Uwe Krupp.

During a 27 December 2013 away game against the Ottawa Senators, Seidenberg was taken down by an Ottawa skater that resulted with Seidenberg's ACL and MCL knee ligaments being injured, ending his play for the season with 6 to 8 months away from hockey following surgery to repair the ligaments.

On 2 March 2016, he had been selected for the 2016 World Cup of Hockey where he represented Team Europe.

At the conclusion of the 2015–16 season, Seidenberg's seven-year tenure with the Bruins ended, as he was bought out from the remaining two years of his contract on 30 June 2016.

=== New York Islanders ===
On 28 September 2016, Seidenberg signed a one-year contract with the New York Islanders. He signed a new one-year deal with the team on 24 April 2017.

After going most of the season unsigned, Seidenberg re-signed with the Islanders on a reported one-year, $700,000 contract on 26 February 2019. However, he did not play for the Islanders during the season. He announced his retirement on 23 October 2019.

== Career statistics ==
=== Regular season and playoffs ===
			Regular season					Playoffs
Season	Team	League	GP	G	A	Pts	PIM	GP	G	A	Pts	PIM
1997–98	Schwenninger ERC II	GER-3	11	1	0	1	2	—	—	—	—	—
1998–99	European Bauer Pioneers	Midget	—	—	—	57	—	—	—	—	—	—
1999–00	Adler Mannheim	DEL	3	0	0	0	0	—	—	—	—	—
1999–00	Mannheimer ERC II	GER-3	52	12	28	40	28	—	—	—	—	—
2000–01	Adler Mannheim	DEL	55	2	5	7	6	12	0	1	1	10
2000–01	Mannheimer ERC II	GER-4	9	3	8	11	20	—	—	—	—	—
2001–02	Adler Mannheim	DEL	55	7	13	20	56	8	0	0	0	2
2002–03	Philadelphia Phantoms	AHL	19	5	6	11	17	—	—	—	—	—
2002–03	Philadelphia Flyers	NHL	58	4	9	13	20	—	—	—	—	—
2003–04	Philadelphia Phantoms	AHL	33	7	12	19	31	9	2	2	4	4
2003–04	Philadelphia Flyers	NHL	5	0	0	0	2	3	0	0	0	0
2004–05	Philadelphia Phantoms	AHL	79	13	28	41	47	18	2	8	10	19
2005–06	Philadelphia Flyers	NHL	29	2	5	7	4	—	—	—	—	—
2005–06	Phoenix Coyotes	NHL	34	1	10	11	14	—	—	—	—	—
2006–07	Phoenix Coyotes	NHL	32	1	1	2	16	—	—	—	—	—
2006–07	Carolina Hurricanes	NHL	20	1	5	6	2	—	—	—	—	—
2007–08	Carolina Hurricanes	NHL	47	0	15	15	18	—	—	—	—	—
2008–09	Carolina Hurricanes	NHL	70	5	25	30	37	16	1	5	6	16
2009–10	Florida Panthers	NHL	62	2	21	23	33	—	—	—	—	—
2009–10	Boston Bruins	NHL	17	2	7	9	6	—	—	—	—	—
2010–11	Boston Bruins	NHL	81	7	25	32	41	25	1	10	11	31
2011–12	Boston Bruins	NHL	80	5	18	23	39	7	1	2	3	2
2012–13	Adler Mannheim	DEL	26	2	18	20	20	—	—	—	—	—
2012–13	Boston Bruins	NHL	46	4	13	17	10	18	0	1	1	4
2013–14	Boston Bruins	NHL	34	1	9	10	10	—	—	—	—	—
2014–15	Boston Bruins	NHL	82	3	11	14	34	—	—	—	—	—
2015–16	Boston Bruins	NHL	61	1	11	12	24	—	—	—	—	—
2016–17	New York Islanders	NHL	73	5	17	22	32	—	—	—	—	—
2017–18	New York Islanders	NHL	28	0	5	5	17	—	—	—	—	—
DEL totals			139	11	36	47	82	20	0	1	1	12
NHL totals			859	44	207	251	359	69	3	18	21	53

=== International ===
Year	Team	Event	GP	G	A	Pts	PIM
1999	Germany	WJC18	4	0	0	0	2
2000	Germany	WJC B	5	0	0	0	0
2001	Germany	WJC D1	5	1	3	4	2
2001	Germany	WC	7	0	1	1	2
2002	Germany	OG	7	1	1	2	4
2002	Germany	WC	7	1	2	3	8
2004	Germany	WCH	4	0	0	0	0
2006	Germany	OG	5	0	0	0	6
2008	Germany	WC	6	0	0	0	14
2010	Germany	OG	4	1	0	1	2
2016	Germany	OGQ	3	0	1	1	0
2016	Team Europe	WCH	5	0	1	1	2
2017	Germany	WC	8	1	7	8	4
2018	Germany	WC	7	0	0	0	2
Junior totals			14	1	3	4	4
Senior totals			60	4	12	16	44

== Awards and honors ==
Award	Year
NHL
YoungStars Game	2003
Stanley Cup	2011
International
Best Defenceman	2017
WC All-Star Team	2017
