= 2017 IIHF World Championship =

2017 edition of the IIHF World Championship

Tournament details
- Host countries: Germany; France
- Venues: 2 (in 2 host cities)
- Dates: 5–21 May 2017
- Opened by: Frank-Walter Steinmeier and François Hollande
- Teams: 16

Final positions
- Champions: Sweden (10th title)
- Runners-up: Canada
- Third place: Russia
- Fourth place: Finland

Tournament statistics
- Games played: 64
- Goals scored: 355 (5.55 per game)
- Attendance: 686,391 (10,725 per game)
- Scoring leader: (Russia) Artemi Panarin (17 points)

Awards
- MVP: (Sweden) William Nylander

Official website
- Website

The 2017 IIHF World Championship, the 2017 edition of the annual Ice Hockey World Championships, was held from 5 to 21 May 2017 in Cologne, Germany and Paris, France. The official tournament mascots were Asterix and Obelix, the main characters from popular French comic book series The Adventures of Asterix. The logo incorporates the silhouette of deceased German national team goaltender Robert Müller, who succumbed to a brain tumor at just 28 years of age. German tennis player Angelique Kerber, 1. FC Köln and German Olympic soccer team goalkeeper Timo Horn and Paris Saint-Germain F.C.'s Brazilian winger Lucas Moura were named celebrity ambassadors for the event.

Sweden won the tournament by defeating Canada 2–1 after a penalty shoot-out. Russia won the bronze medal game, defeating Finland 5–3.

== Bids ==
There were two official bids to host these championships.

- Denmark/ Latvia
  - Copenhagen/Riga

Denmark has never hosted these championships. Latvia hosted these championships for the first time in 2006. The proposed arenas were Arena Riga and the planned Copenhagen Arena.

- France/ Germany
  - Paris/Cologne

France last hosted these championships in 1951. Germany hosted the championships most recently in 2010. The proposed arenas were AccorHotels Arena in Paris and Lanxess Arena in Cologne.

The decision on who hosts the tournament was decided on May 17, 2013 in Stockholm, Sweden. The united bid of France and Germany received 63 votes, while the bid of Denmark and Latvia received 45.

== Participants ==
- Belarus (Note: Automatic qualifier after a top 14 placement at the 2016 IIHF World Championship)
- Canada
- Czech Republic
- Denmark
- Finland
- France (Note: Qualified as the co-hosts)
- Germany
- Italy (Note: Qualified through winning a promotion at the 2016 IIHF World Championship Division I)
- Latvia
- Norway
- Russia
- Slovakia
- Slovenia
- Sweden
- Switzerland
- United States

== Seeding ==
The seeding in the preliminary round was based on the 2016 IIHF World Ranking, which ended at the conclusion of the 2016 IIHF World Championship.

Group A (Cologne)

- Russia (2)
- United States (4)
- Sweden (5)
- Slovakia (8)
- Germany (10)
- Latvia (12)
- Denmark (13)
- Italy (16)

Group B (Paris)

- Canada (1)
- Finland (3)
- Czech Republic (6)
- Switzerland (7)
- Belarus (9)
- Norway (11)
- France (14)
- Slovenia (15)

== Venues ==
France	2017 IIHF World Championship is located in Northern and Central Europe	Germany
Paris	2017 IIHF World Championship is located in Northern and Central Europe	Cologne
AccorHotels Arena; Capacity: 14,510	2017 IIHF World Championship is located in Northern and Central Europe	Lanxess Arena; Capacity: 18,500

== Rosters ==
Each team's roster consisted of at least 15 skaters (forwards, and defencemen) and 2 goaltenders, and at most 22 skaters and 3 goaltenders. All 16 participating nations, through the confirmation of their respective national associations, had to submit a "Long List" no later than two weeks before the tournament, and a final roster by the Passport Control meeting prior to the start of tournament.

== Officials ==
The IIHF selected 16 referees and 16 linesmen to work the tournament.

Referees	Linesmen
(Finland) Stefan Fonselius; (Russia) Roman Gofman; (Canada) Oliver Gouin; (Czech Republic) Jan Hribik; (Canada) Brett Iverson; (Czech Republic) Antonín Jeřábek; (Slovakia) Jozef Kubuš; (Austria) Mark Lemelin; (Sweden) Marcus Linde; (Latvia) Eduards Odiņš; (Sweden) Linus Öhlund; (Germany) Daniel Piechaczek; (United States) Stephen Reneau; (Finland) Anssi Salonen; (Switzerland) Daniel Stricker; (Switzerland) Tobias Wehrli	(Belarus) Ivan Dedyulya; (Denmark) Rene Jensen; (Switzerland) Roman Kaderli; (Germany) Lukas Kohlmüller; (Russia) Gleb Lazarev; (Netherlands) Joep Leermakers; (Czech Republic) Miroslav Lhotský; (Sweden) Andreas Malmqvist; (United States) Brian Oliver; (Russia) Alexander Otmakhov; (United States) Judson Ritter; (Slovakia) Peter Šefčík; (Finland) Hannu Sormunen; (Czech Republic) Libor Suchánek; (Finland) Sakari Suominen; (Canada) Nathan Vanoosten

== Preliminary round ==
The schedule was announced on 9 August 2016.

=== Group A ===
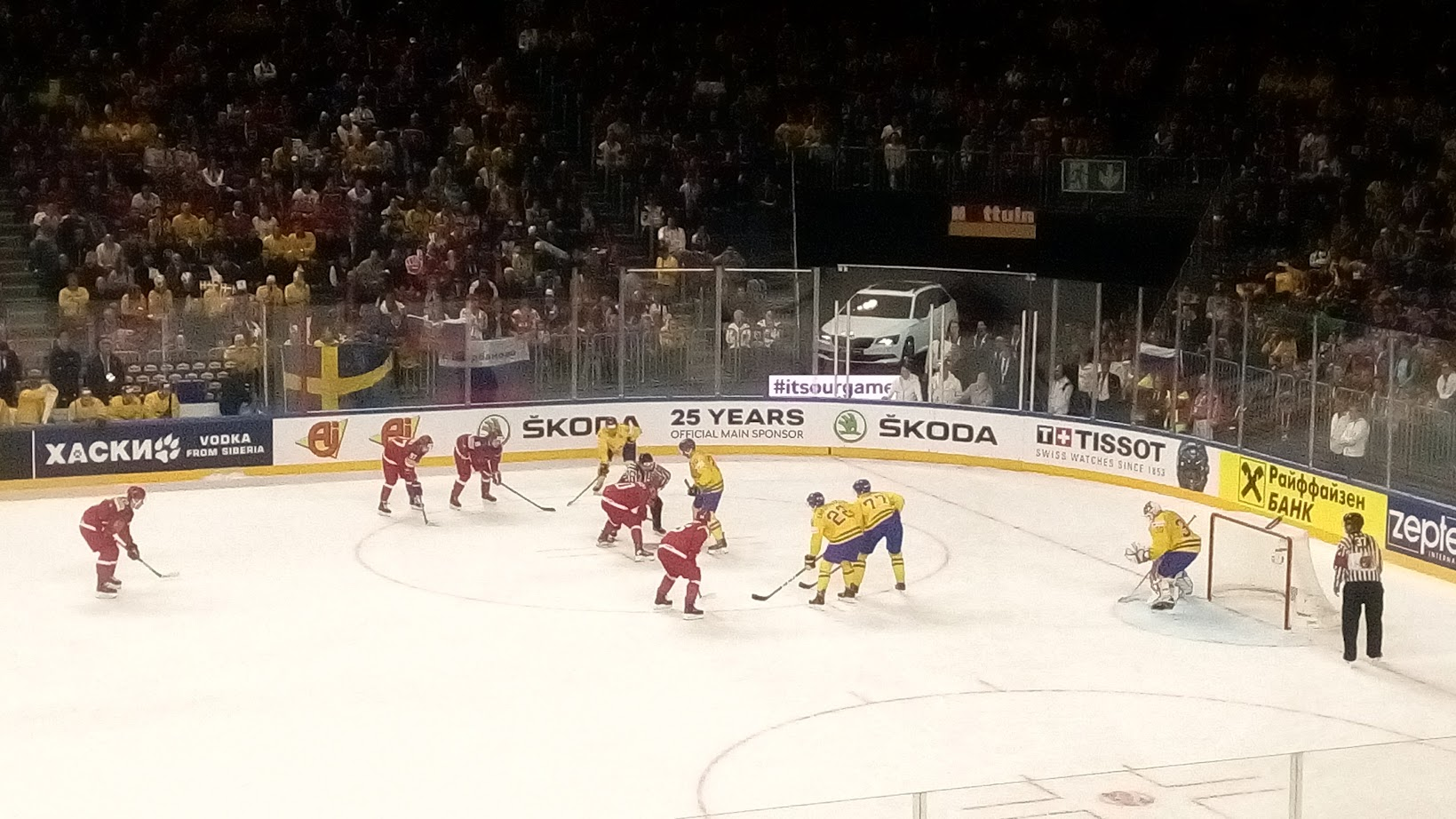
Sweden vs Russia at the Lanxess Arena

Pos	Team	Pld	W	OTW	OTL	L	GF	GA	GD	Pts	Qualification or relegation
1	United States	7	6	0	0	1	31	14	+17	18	Playoff round
2	Russia	7	5	1	0	1	35	10	+25	17	Playoff round
3	Sweden	7	5	0	1	1	29	13	+16	16	Playoff round
4	Germany (H)	7	2	2	1	2	20	23	−3	11	Playoff round
5	Latvia	7	3	0	1	3	14	18	−4	10	
6	Denmark	7	1	2	0	4	13	22	−9	7	
7	Slovakia	7	0	1	2	4	12	28	−16	4	
8	Italy (R)	7	0	0	1	6	6	32	−26	1	Relegation to Division I A (Note: The rules state that "the bottom ranked two teams will be relegated" and the 2018 hosts (Denmark) cannot be relegated by rule.)

Source: IIHF
Rules for classification: 1) points; 2) head-to-head points; 3) head-to-head goal difference; 4) head-to-head number of goals scored; 5) result against closest best-ranked team outside tied teams; 6) result against second-best ranked team outside tied teams; 7) seeding before tournament.
(H) Host; (R) Relegated
Notes:

5 May 2017
Sweden	1–2 (GWS)	Russia
United States	1–2	Germany
6 May 2017
Latvia	3–0	Denmark
Slovakia	3–2 (OT)	Italy
Germany	2–7	Sweden
7 May 2017
Italy	1–10	Russia
United States	7–2	Denmark
Latvia	3–1	Slovakia
8 May 2017
Germany	3–6	Russia
United States	4–3	Sweden
9 May 2017
Italy	1–2	Latvia
Slovakia	3–4 (GWS)	Denmark
10 May 2017
United States	3–0	Italy
Slovakia	2–3 (GWS)	Germany
11 May 2017
Russia	3–0	Denmark
Sweden	2–0	Latvia
12 May 2017
Sweden	8–1	Italy
Denmark	3–2 (OT)	Germany
13 May 2017
Latvia	3–5	United States
Russia	6–0	Slovakia
Italy	1–4	Germany
14 May 2017
Slovakia	1–6	United States
Denmark	2–4	Sweden
15 May 2017
Denmark	2–0	Italy
Russia	5–0	Latvia
16 May 2017
Sweden	4–2	Slovakia
Russia	3–5	United States
Germany	4–3 (GWS)	Latvia

=== Group B ===
Pos	Team	Pld	W	OTW	OTL	L	GF	GA	GD	Pts	Qualification or relegation
1	Canada	7	6	0	1	0	32	10	+22	19	Playoff round
2	Switzerland	7	3	2	2	0	22	14	+8	15	Playoff round
3	Czech Republic	7	3	2	0	2	23	14	+9	13	Playoff round
4	Finland	7	2	2	1	2	20	22	−2	11	Playoff round
5	France (H)	7	2	2	0	3	23	19	+4	10	
6	Norway	7	2	0	2	3	13	19	−6	8	
7	Belarus	7	2	0	1	4	15	27	−12	7	
8	Slovenia (R)	7	0	0	1	6	13	36	−23	1	Relegation to Division I A

Source: IIHF
Rules for classification: 1) points; 2) head-to-head points; 3) head-to-head goal difference; 4) head-to-head number of goals scored; 5) result against closest best-ranked team outside tied teams; 6) result against second-best ranked team outside tied teams; 7) seeding before tournament.
(H) Host; (R) Relegated

5 May 2017
Finland	3–2	Belarus
Czech Republic	1–4	Canada
6 May 2017
Switzerland	5–4 (GWS)	Slovenia
Belarus	1–6	Czech Republic
Norway	3–2	France
7 May 2017
Slovenia	2–7	Canada
Finland	1–5	France
Norway	0–3	Switzerland
8 May 2017
Belarus	0–6	Canada
Finland	3–4 (GWS)	Czech Republic
9 May 2017
Slovenia	1–5	Norway
Switzerland	3–4 (GWS)	France
10 May 2017
Switzerland	3–0	Belarus
Finland	5–2	Slovenia
11 May 2017
Czech Republic	1–0 (OT)	Norway
Canada	3–2	France
12 May 2017
Czech Republic	5–1	Slovenia
France	4–3 (GWS)	Belarus
13 May 2017
Norway	2–3 (OT)	Finland
Slovenia	2–5	Belarus
Canada	2–3 (OT)	Switzerland
14 May 2017
France	2–5	Czech Republic
Switzerland	2–3 (OT)	Finland
15 May 2017
Canada	5–0	Norway
France	4–1	Slovenia
16 May 2017
Belarus	4–3	Norway
Czech Republic	1–3	Switzerland
Canada	5–2	Finland

== Playoff round ==
Quarterfinals
18 May - Cologne
United States	0
Finland	2
18 May - Paris
Switzerland	1
Sweden	3
18 May - Cologne
Canada	2
Germany	1
18 May - Paris
Russia	3
Czech Republic	0

Semifinals
20 May - Cologne
Finland	1
Sweden	4
20 May - Cologne
Canada	4
Russia	2

Final
21 May - Cologne
Sweden (GWS)	2
Canada	1
Third place
21 May - Cologne
Russia	5
Finland	3

=== Quarterfinals ===
18 May 2017; 16:15	United States	0–2 (0–0, 0–1, 0–1)	Finland	Lanxess Arena, Cologne; Attendance: 8,968

Game reference
Jimmy Howard	Goalies	Harri Säteri	Referees: (Canada) Oliver Gouin (Czech Republic) Antonín Jeřábek; Linesmen: (Russia) Gleb Lazarev (Czech Republic) Miroslav Lhotský
0–1 / 21:01 – Rantanen (Savinainen, Aho) (PP); 0–2 / 46:49 – Kemppainen (J. Aaltonen)			Referees: (Canada) Oliver Gouin (Czech Republic) Antonín Jeřábek; Linesmen: (Russia) Gleb Lazarev (Czech Republic) Miroslav Lhotský
12 min	Penalties	4 min	Referees: (Canada) Oliver Gouin (Czech Republic) Antonín Jeřábek; Linesmen: (Russia) Gleb Lazarev (Czech Republic) Miroslav Lhotský
26	Shots	20	Referees: (Canada) Oliver Gouin (Czech Republic) Antonín Jeřábek; Linesmen: (Russia) Gleb Lazarev (Czech Republic) Miroslav Lhotský

18 May 2017; 16:15	Russia	3–0 (2–0, 0–0, 1–0)	Czech Republic	AccorHotels Arena, Paris; Attendance: 6,209

Game reference

Andrei Vasilevskiy
Goalies
Pavel Francouz
Referees:
(Austria) Mark Lemelin
(Switzerland) Tobias Wehrli
Linesmen:
(United States) Brian Oliver
(Canada) Nathan Vanoosten

Orlov (Plotnikov, Antipin) – 08:45	1–0
Kucherov (Kuznetsov, Antipin) (PP) – 13:36	2–0
Panarin (Kucherov, Kuznetsov) – 53:55	3–0

10 min
Penalties
6 min
26
Shots
27

18 May 2017; 20:15	Canada	2–1 (1–0, 1–0, 0–1)	Germany	Lanxess Arena, Cologne; Attendance: 16,653

Game reference

Calvin Pickard
Goalies
Philipp Grubauer
Referees:
(Czech Republic) Jan Hribik
(Switzerland) Daniel Stricker
Linesmen:
(United States) Judson Ritter
(Finland) Sakari Suominen

Scheifele (O'Reilly, Marner) (PP) – 17:11	1–0
Skinner (Matheson, Scheifele) – 38:08	2–0
	2–1	53:21 – Y. Seidenberg (Ehrhoff) (SH)

8 min
Penalties
18 min
50
Shots
20

18 May 2017; 20:15	Switzerland	1–3 (1–1, 0–1, 0–1)	Sweden	AccorHotels Arena, Paris; Attendance: 8,417

Game reference

Leonardo Genoni
Goalies
Henrik Lundqvist
Referees:
(Canada) Brett Iverson
(Slovakia) Jozef Kubuš
Linesmen:
(Russia) Alexander Otmakhov
(Czech Republic) Libor Suchánek

	0–1	04:15 – Bäckström (Lindberg, Nylander)
Haas – 12:53	1–1
	1–2	33:15 – Nylander (Ekman-Larsson)
	1–3	43:44 – Edler (J. Lundqvist)

2 min
Penalties
6 min
27
Shots
29

=== Semifinals ===
20 May 2017; 15:15	Canada	4–2 (0–0, 0–2, 4–0)	Russia	Lanxess Arena, Cologne; Attendance: 16,469

Game reference

Calvin Pickard
Goalies
Andrei Vasilevskiy
Referees:
(Austria) Mark Lemelin
(Switzerland) Daniel Stricker
Linesmen:
(Czech Republic) Miroslav Lhotský
(United States) Brian Oliver

	0–1	32:16 – Kuznetsov (Panarin, Kucherov)
	0–2	34:50 – Gusev (Shipachyov, Panarin) (PP)
Scheifele (MacKinnon, Parayko) (PP) – 40:17	1–2
MacKinnon (Konecny) – 55:07	2–2
O'Reilly (Matheson) – 56:58	3–2
Couturier (O'Reilly, Parayko) (ENG) – 58:53	4–2

10 min
Penalties
22 min
38
Shots
28

20 May 2017; 19:15	Sweden	4–1 (1–1, 2–0, 1–0)	Finland	Lanxess Arena, Cologne; Attendance: 11,242

Game reference

Henrik Lundqvist
Goalies
Harri Säteri
Referees:
(Czech Republic) Jan Hribik
(Czech Republic) Antonín Jeřábek
Linesmen:
(Russia) Alexander Otmakhov
(Canada) Nathan Vanoosten

Edler (Bäckström) – 01:49	1–0
	1–1	04:45 – Kemppainen (Aaltonen)
J. Klingberg (Ekman-Larsson, Nylander) (PP) – 24:36	2–1
Nylander (Bäckström) (PP) – 34:52	3–1
Nordström (Krüger) – 53:52	4–1

6 min
Penalties
10 min
41
Shots
23

=== Bronze medal game ===
21 May 2017; 16:15	Russia	5–3 (1–0, 3–1, 1–2)	Finland	Lanxess Arena, Cologne; Attendance: 16,182

Game reference

Andrei Vasilevskiy
Goalies
Joonas Korpisalo
Harri Säteri
Referees:
(Canada) Oliver Gouin
(Canada) Brett Iverson
Linesmen:
(Czech Republic) Miroslav Lhotský
(United States) Brian Oliver

Gusev (Antipin, Nichushkin) – 06:58	1–0
Tkachyov (Nichushkin, Zub) (SH) – 21:48	2–0
Gusev (Panarin, Dadonov) (PP) – 27:01	3–0
Kiselevich (Namestnikov, Nichushkin) – 28:16	4–0
	4–1	39:33 – Rantanen (Filppula)
	4–2	41:16 – Lehtonen (Aho)
	4–3	45:29 – Savinainen (Rantanen, Aho) (PP)
Kucherov (Gusev, Belov) – 49:49	5–3

8 min
Penalties
10 min
30
Shots
29

=== Gold medal game ===
21 May 2017; 20:45	Canada	1–2 GWS (0–0, 0–1, 1–0) (OT 0–0) (SO: 0–1)	Sweden	Lanxess Arena, Cologne; Attendance: 17,363

Game reference
Calvin Pickard	Goalies	Henrik Lundqvist	Referees: (Czech Republic) Antonín Jeřábek (Switzerland) Daniel Stricker; Linesmen: (Russia) Alexander Otmakhov (Finland) Sakari Suominen
/ 0–1 / 39:39 – Hedman (SH); O'Reilly (Marner, MacKinnon) (PP) – 41:58 / 1–1			Referees: (Czech Republic) Antonín Jeřábek (Switzerland) Daniel Stricker; Linesmen: (Russia) Alexander Otmakhov (Finland) Sakari Suominen
MacKinnon (miss); Point (miss); O'Reilly (miss); Marner (miss)	Shootout	(miss) Nylander; Bäckström; Ekman-Larsson; (miss) Landeskog	Referees: (Czech Republic) Antonín Jeřábek (Switzerland) Daniel Stricker; Linesmen: (Russia) Alexander Otmakhov (Finland) Sakari Suominen
10 min	Penalties	8 min	Referees: (Czech Republic) Antonín Jeřábek (Switzerland) Daniel Stricker; Linesmen: (Russia) Alexander Otmakhov (Finland) Sakari Suominen
43	Shots	42	Referees: (Czech Republic) Antonín Jeřábek (Switzerland) Daniel Stricker; Linesmen: (Russia) Alexander Otmakhov (Finland) Sakari Suominen

== Ranking and statistics ==
=== Final ranking ===
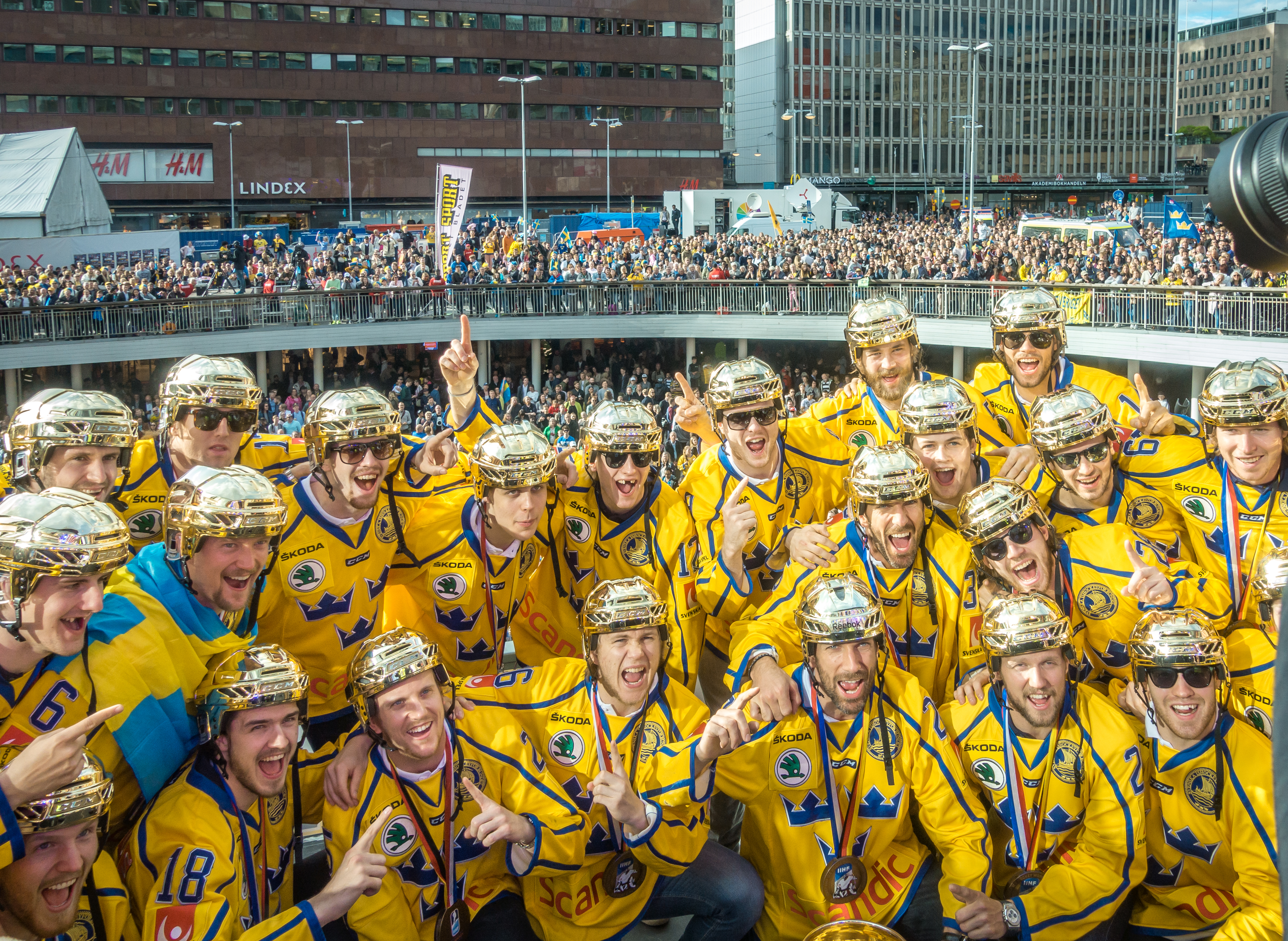
Sweden celebrating gold

Pos	Grp	Team	Pld	W	OTW	OTL	L	GF	GA	GD	Pts	Final result
1	A	Sweden	10	7	1	1	1	38	16	+22	24	Champions
2	B	Canada	10	8	0	2	0	39	15	+24	26	Runners-up
3	A	Russia	10	7	1	0	2	45	17	+28	23	Third place
4	B	Finland	10	3	2	1	4	26	31	−5	14	Fourth place
5	A	United States	8	6	0	0	2	31	16	+15	18	Eliminated in Quarter-finals
6	B	Switzerland	8	3	2	2	1	23	17	+6	15	Eliminated in Quarter-finals
7	B	Czech Republic	8	3	2	0	3	23	17	+6	13	Eliminated in Quarter-finals
8	A	Germany (H)	8	2	2	1	3	21	25	−4	11	Eliminated in Quarter-finals
9	B	France (H)	7	2	2	0	3	23	19	+4	10	Eliminated in Group stage
10	A	Latvia	7	3	0	1	3	14	18	−4	10	Eliminated in Group stage
11	B	Norway	7	2	0	2	3	13	19	−6	8	Eliminated in Group stage
12	A	Denmark	7	1	2	0	4	13	22	−9	7	Eliminated in Group stage
13	B	Belarus	7	2	0	1	4	15	27	−12	7	Eliminated in Group stage
14	A	Slovakia	7	0	1	2	4	12	28	−16	4	Eliminated in Group stage
15	B	Slovenia	7	0	0	1	6	13	36	−23	1	2018 IIHF World Championship Division I
16	A	Italy	7	0	0	1	6	6	32	−26	1	2018 IIHF World Championship Division I

Source: IIHF.com
(H) Host

=== Statistics ===
==== Scoring leaders ====
List shows the top skaters sorted by points, then goals.

Player	GP	G	A	Pts	+/−	PIM	POS
(Russia) Artemi Panarin	9	4	13	17	+4	4	F
(Russia) Nikita Kucherov	10	7	8	15	+7	8	F
(Canada) Nathan MacKinnon	10	6	9	15	+6	6	F
(Russia) Nikita Gusev	10	7	7	14	+5	4	F
(Sweden) William Nylander	10	7	7	14	+11	2	F
(Russia) Vadim Shipachyov	10	2	11	13	+1	2	F
(Canada) Mitch Marner	10	4	8	12	+1	8	F
(United States) Johnny Gaudreau	8	6	5	11	+2	0	F
(Finland) Sebastian Aho	10	2	9	11	-2	4	F
(France) Stéphane Da Costa	6	6	4	10	+3	2	F

GP = Games played; G = Goals; A = Assists; Pts = Points; +/− = Plus/minus; PIM = Penalties in minutes; POS = Position
Source: IIHF.com

==== Goaltending leaders ====
Only the top five goaltenders, based on save percentage, who have played at least 40% of their team's minutes, are included in this list.

Player	TOI	GA	GAA	SA	Sv%	SO
(Sweden) Henrik Lundqvist	320:00	7	1.31	129	94.57	0
(Canada) Calvin Pickard	443:40	11	1.49	178	93.82	1
(Russia) Andrei Vasilevskiy	522:51	15	1.72	233	93.56	3
(Latvia) Elvis Merzļikins	364:04	12	1.98	183	93.44	1
(Switzerland) Leonardo Genoni	361:32	10	1.66	150	93.33	2

TOI = Time on Ice (minutes:seconds); SA = Shots against; GA = Goals against; GAA = Goals against average; Sv% = Save percentage; SO = Shutouts
Source: IIHF.com

=== Awards ===
- Best players selected by the directorate:
  - Best Goaltender: (Russia) Andrei Vasilevskiy
  - Best Defenceman: (Germany) Dennis Seidenberg
  - Best Forward: (Russia) Artemi Panarin

Source: IIHF.com

- Media All-Stars:
  - MVP: (Sweden) William Nylander
  - Goaltender: (Russia) Andrei Vasilevskiy
  - Defencemen: (Canada) Colton Parayko / (Germany) Dennis Seidenberg
  - Forwards: (Sweden) William Nylander / (Russia) Artemi Panarin / (Canada) Nathan MacKinnon

Source: IIHF.com

== IIHF honors and awards ==
The 2017 IIHF Hall of Fame inductees and award recipients were honored during the World Championship medal ceremonies in Cologne.

IIHF Hall of Fame inductees

- Dieter Kalt Sr., Austria
- Saku Koivu, Finland
- Uwe Krupp, Germany
- Angela Ruggiero, United States
- Joe Sakic, Canada
- Teemu Selänne, Finland

Award recipients

- Patrick Francheterre of France received the Paul Loicq Award for outstanding contributions to international ice hockey.
- Tony Hand of Great Britain received the Torriani Award for a player with an outstanding career from non-top hockey nation.
