= Nikita Gusev =

Russian ice hockey player (born 1992)

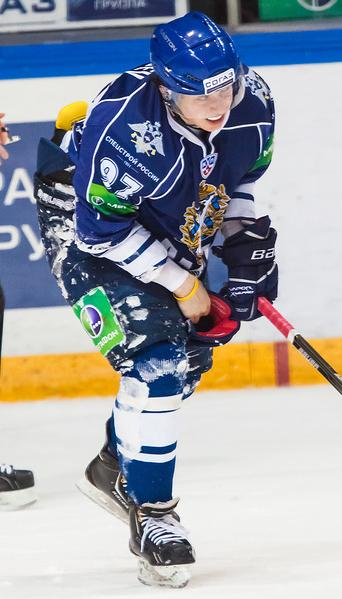
- Gusev with Amur Khabarovsk in 2013
- Born: 8 July 1992 (age 34) Moscow, Russia
- Height: 5 ft 9 in (175 cm)
- Weight: 163 lb (74 kg; 11 st 9 lb)
- Position: Left wing
- Shoots: Right
- KHL team Former teams: Free agent CSKA Moscow; Amur Khabarovsk; Yugra Khanty-Mansiysk; SKA Saint Petersburg; New Jersey Devils; Florida Panthers; Dynamo Moscow
- National team: Russia
- NHL draft: 202nd overall, 2012; Tampa Bay Lightning
- Playing career: 2010–present

Nikita Andreyevich Gusev (Russian: Никита Андреевич Гусев; born 8 July 1992), nicknamed "Goose", is a Russian professional ice hockey forward currently an unrestricted free agent. He most recently played under contract for HC Dynamo Moscow of the Kontinental Hockey League (KHL).

He became known as one of the best players in the KHL – winning the KHL's Golden Stick (MVP) award in 2018, and 2024 and finished the 2023–24 Season with 89 points (23 goals, 66 assists). His 89 points is the highest season total in the history of the KHL, beating out Sergei Mozyakin's record of 85 points. Gusev won the KHL's Gagarin Cup championship in 2017 with SKA Saint Petersburg.

Internationally, he has represented Russia on numerous occasions, winning a gold medal at the 2018 Winter Olympics and a silver medal at the 2022 Winter Olympics.

== Playing career ==
=== Professional ===
==== SKA Saint Petersburg ====
On 14 July 2017, Gusev signed a two-year contract extension with Kontinental Hockey League (KHL) powerhouse club SKA Saint Petersburg.

In the 2018–19 season, his last season under contract with SKA, Gusev posted a career and league-high 82 points, leading the KHL with 65 assists. He continued his offensive dominance in the post-season, contributing 19 points in 18 games before suffering a conference final defeat for the second consecutive season to CSKA Moscow. Through nine seasons in the KHL, Gusev is 10th all-time with 332 points in 391 games.

==== New Jersey Devils ====
On 21 June 2017, with the selection of Jason Garrison by the Vegas Golden Knights in the 2017 NHL Expansion Draft, the Knights received from the Tampa Bay Lightning the rights to Gusev, along with a second-round pick in the 2017 NHL entry draft and a fourth-round pick in the 2018 NHL entry draft as compensation for the Golden Knights agreeing to select Garrison.

On 14 April 2019, Gusev signed a one-year, entry-level contract with the Vegas Golden Knights, instantly joining the club amid their first-round playoff series against the San Jose Sharks, remaining on the Golden Knights extended squad without playing for the club.

On 29 July 2019, Gusev as a restricted free agent, was traded by the Golden Knights to the New Jersey Devils in exchange for a third-round pick in 2020 and a second-round pick in the 2021 NHL entry draft. He immediately agreed to terms with the Devils on a two-year, $9 million contract with an average annual value of $4,500,000. In the following 2019–20 season, Gusev made an immediate offensive impact with the rebuilding Devils, leading the club with 31 assists and placing second in points with 44 through 66 games before the remainder of the regular season was cancelled due to the COVID-19 pandemic.

With the Devils missing the postseason, Gusev returned to action in the delayed 2020–21 season and struggled to replicate the previous season's campaign offensively, posting just two goals and five points through 20 games. On 9 April 2021, the Devils placed Gusev on unconditional waivers in order to mutually terminate the remainder of his contract.

==== Florida Panthers ====
On 11 April 2021, Gusev signed as a free agent to a one-year, $1 million contract with the Florida Panthers.

==== Return to SKA ====
As a free agent over the summer and approaching the 2021–22 season, Gusev opted to continue his career in the NHL, signing a Professional Tryout contract in accepting an invitation to attend the Toronto Maple Leafs training camp on September 18, 2021. Gusev was later released from his tryout on October 5, 2021. with no other NHL teams expressing an interest he opted to return to the KHL, with his former team SKA Saint Petersburg.

Gusev enjoyed two offensively productive seasons with SKA, before opting to leave the club as a free agent at the conclusion of the 2022–23 season on 30 April 2023.

==== Dynamo Moscow ====
On 18 July 2023, Gusev as a free agent agreed to terms on a one-year contract with his fifth KHL club, HC Dynamo Moscow, for the 2023–24 season. After a highly productive debut season with Dynamo, Gusev was re-signed to a one-year contract extension on 1 August 2024.

== International play ==
Medal record

Men's ice hockey

Representing Olympic Athletes from Russia

Olympic Games
Gold medal – first place	2018 Pyeongchang	

Representing ROC

Olympic Games
Silver medal – second place	2022 Beijing	

Representing Russia

World Championships
Bronze medal – third place	2017 Germany/France	
Bronze medal – third place	2019 Slovakia	

World Junior Championships
Silver medal – second place	2012 Canada	

World Junior A Challenge
Bronze medal – third place	2009 Summerside	

Gusev has played for Russia at the World Junior Championships and World Championships. He was a member of the Olympic Athletes from Russia team at the 2018 Winter Olympics.

On 23 January 2022, Gusev was named to the roster to represent Russian Olympic Committee athletes at the 2022 Winter Olympics.

== Career statistics ==
=== Regular season and playoffs ===
			Regular season					Playoffs
Season	Team	League	GP	G	A	Pts	PIM	GP	G	A	Pts	PIM
2007–08	Belye Medvedi Moskva	MosJHL	7	5	9	14	0	—	—	—	—	—
2008–09	Belye Medvedi Moskva	MosJHL	24	30	33	63	6	—	—	—	—	—
2009–10	Krasnaya Armiya	MHL	48	17	40	57	14	5	1	2	3	0
2010–11	CSKA Moscow	KHL	18	1	0	1	2	—	—	—	—	—
2010–11	Krasnaya Armiya	MHL	38	22	37	59	14	16	17	10	27	6
2011–12	CSKA Moscow	KHL	15	2	1	3	0	1	0	0	0	0
2011–12	Krasnaya Armiya	MHL	34	30	46	76	26	19	16	17	33	0
2012–13	CSKA Moscow	KHL	6	0	1	1	0	—	—	—	—	—
2012–13	THK Tver	VHL	15	7	6	13	2	—	—	—	—	—
2012–13	Amur Khabarovsk	KHL	24	4	8	12	6	—	—	—	—	—
2013–14	HC Yugra	KHL	44	8	6	14	10	—	—	—	—	—
2014–15	HC Yugra	KHL	55	21	16	37	12	—	—	—	—	—
2015–16	HC Yugra	KHL	23	7	7	14	4	—	—	—	—	—
2015–16	SKA Saint Petersburg	KHL	33	13	22	35	10	15	5	9	14	0
2016–17	SKA Saint Petersburg	KHL	57	24	47	71	8	18	7	16	23	2
2017–18	SKA Saint Petersburg	KHL	54	22	40	62	2	15	7	5	12	2
2018–19	SKA Saint Petersburg	KHL	62	17	65	82	10	18	9	10	19	0
2019–20	New Jersey Devils	NHL	66	13	31	44	12	—	—	—	—	—
2020–21	New Jersey Devils	NHL	20	2	3	5	0	—	—	—	—	—
2020–21	Florida Panthers	NHL	11	2	3	5	2	—	—	—	—	—
2021–22	SKA Saint Petersburg	KHL	31	10	25	35	4	16	7	9	16	12
2022–23	SKA Saint Petersburg	KHL	37	23	26	49	6	13	5	7	12	0
2023–24	Dynamo Moscow	KHL	68	23	66	89	10	9	3	7	10	2
2024–25	Dynamo Moscow	KHL	68	29	40	69	12	17	5	6	11	8
2025–26	Dynamo Moscow	KHL	66	17	38	55	4	4	1	1	2	0
KHL totals			661	221	408	629	100	126	49	70	119	26
NHL totals			97	17	37	54	14	—	—	—	—	—

=== International ===
Year	Team	Event	Result	GP	G	A	Pts	PIM
2012	Russia	WJC	2nd place, silver medalist(s)	7	3	6	9	0
2017	Russia	WC	3rd place, bronze medalist(s)	10	7	7	14	4
2018	OAR	OG	1st place, gold medalist(s)	6	4	8	12	4
2018	Russia	WC	6th	4	1	3	4	0
2019	Russia	WC	3rd place, bronze medalist(s)	10	4	12	16	0
2022	ROC	OG	2nd place, silver medalist(s)	6	0	6	6	2
Junior totals				7	3	6	9	0
Senior totals				36	16	36	52	10

== Awards and honors ==
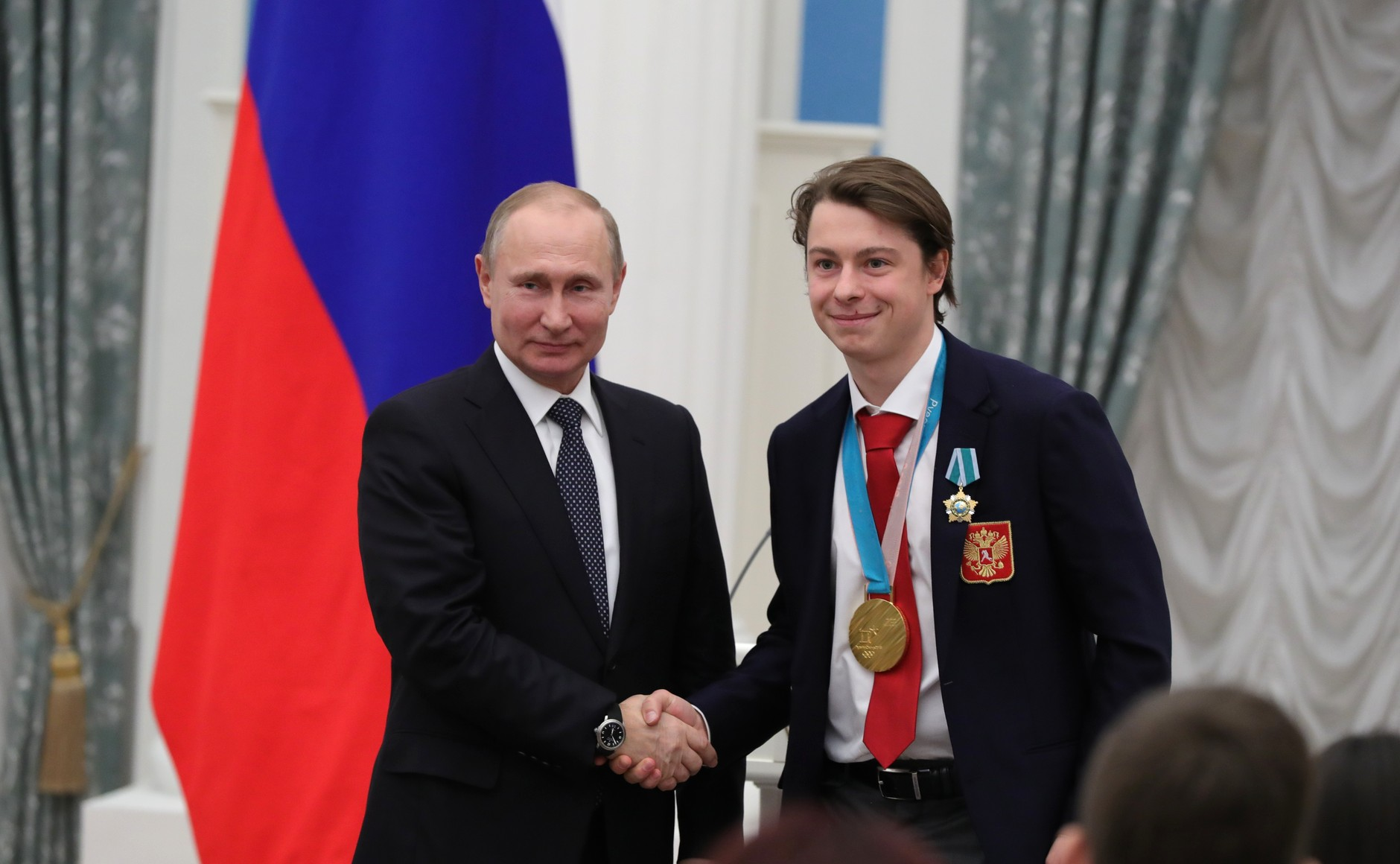
Gusev with Russian President Vladimir Putin in 2018.

Award	Year
KHL
All-Star Game	2015, 2016, 2018, 2019
Golden Stick (MVP)	2018, 2024
Gagarin Cup champion	2017
International
Olympic Best Forward	2018
