= Yannic Seidenberg =

German ice hockey player (born 1984)

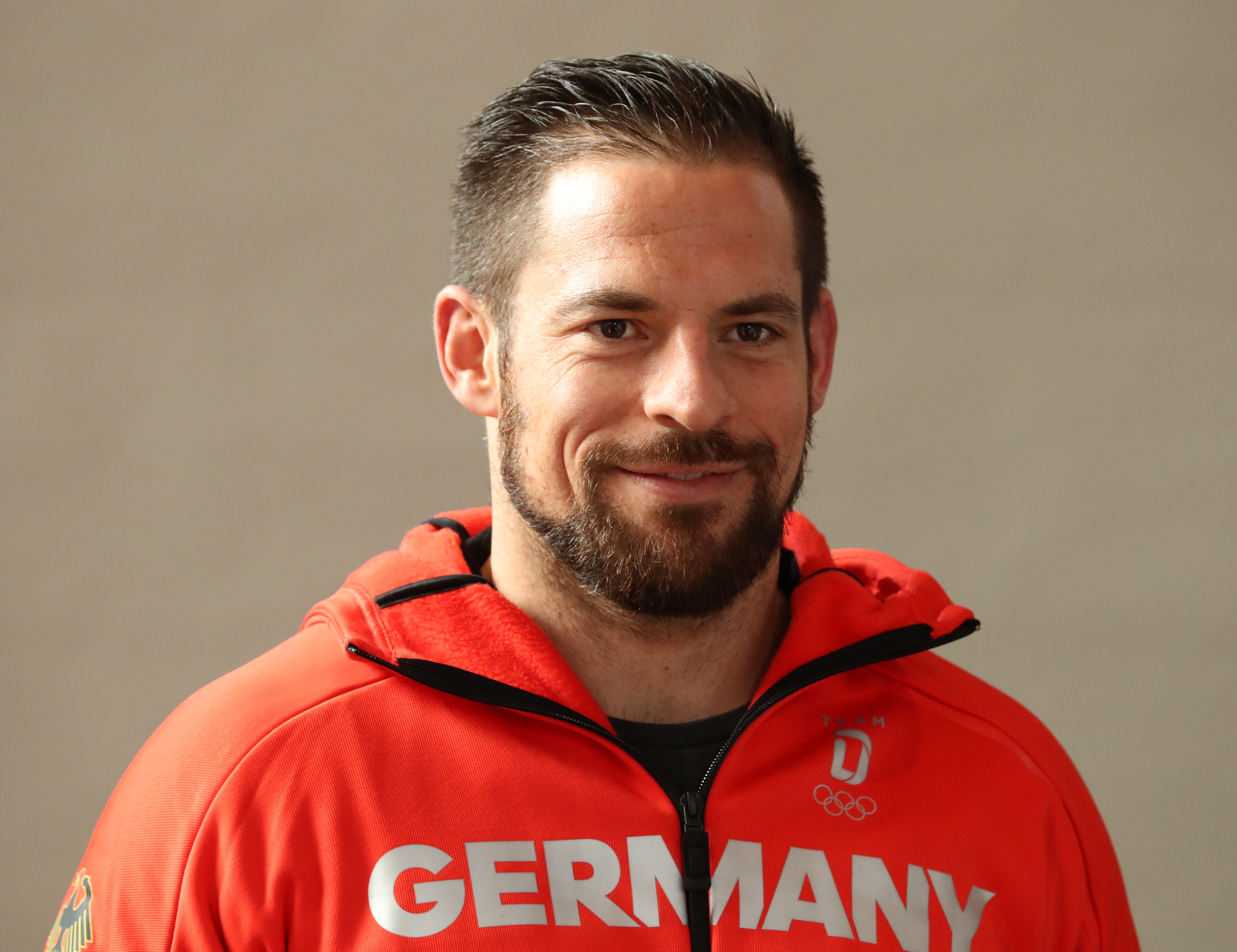
- Born: 11 January 1984 (age 42) Villingen-Schwenningen, West Germany
- Height: 5 ft 8 in (173 cm)
- Weight: 181 lb (82 kg; 12 st 13 lb)
- Position: Left wing
- Shoots: Left
- DEL team Former teams: Free agent Kölner Haie; ERC Ingolstadt; Adler Mannheim; EHC München
- National team: Germany
- NHL draft: Undrafted
- Playing career: 2001–present

Yannic Seidenberg (born 11 January 1984) is a German professional ice hockey left winger who is currently an unrestricted free agent. He most recently played for EHC München of the Deutsche Eishockey Liga (DEL). He is the younger brother of defenseman Dennis Seidenberg.

== Playing career ==
He started his professional career with Adler Mannheim and signed with the Medicine Hat Tigers of the Western Hockey League before the 2003–04 season. After one year he returned to Germany and signed with Kölner Haie; one year later he signed with ERC Ingolstadt, where he spent the next four seasons before returning to Mannheim. On 29 April 2013, Seidenberg signed a two-year deal with DEL rival EHC München. He also represented Germany at the 2018 IIHF World Championship.

Seidenberg served a ban of 30 months from September 2022 to March 2025 for an anti-doping rule violation after testing positive for DHEA and excessive levels of testosterone. An original sanction of four-years was reduced by 18 months after an appeal to the Court of Arbitration for Sport.

== Career statistics ==
=== Regular season and playoffs ===
			Regular season					Playoffs
Season	Team	League	GP	G	A	Pts	PIM	GP	G	A	Pts	PIM
1999–2000	Jungadler Mannheim	GER U20	12	5	5	10	8	—	—	—	—	—
2000–01	Jungadler Mannheim	DNL	35	17	44	61	116	—	—	—	—	—
2000–01	Mannheimer ERC II	GER.4	11	2	3	5	12	—	—	—	—	—
2001–02	Jungadler Mannheim	DNL	2	1	1	2	0	1	0	2	2	4
2001–02	Adler Mannheim	DEL	59	0	8	8	16	7	0	0	0	2
2002–03	Adler Mannheim	DEL	45	2	9	11	22	8	0	0	0	2
2003–04	Adler Mannheim	DEL	3	0	0	0	0	—	—	—	—	—
2003–04	Medicine Hat Tigers	WHL	67	19	47	66	73	20	5	14	19	12
2004–05	Kölner Haie	DEL	52	0	4	4	30	7	0	1	1	14
2005–06	ERC Ingolstadt	DEL	51	5	16	21	95	7	1	1	2	8
2006–07	ERC Ingolstadt	DEL	49	14	16	30	81	5	0	1	1	49
2007–08	ERC Ingolstadt	DEL	55	17	25	42	71	3	2	0	2	0
2008–09	ERC Ingolstadt	DEL	39	10	14	24	44	—	—	—	—	—
2009–10	Adler Mannheim	DEL	46	11	11	22	50	2	0	1	1	2
2010–11	Adler Mannheim	DEL	50	14	6	20	50	6	3	1	4	2
2011–12	Adler Mannheim	DEL	51	7	19	26	71	14	2	2	4	10
2012–13	Adler Mannheim	DEL	50	7	18	25	46	6	1	0	1	4
2013–14	EHC Red Bull München	DEL	46	6	15	21	69	3	0	0	0	2
2014–15	EHC Red Bull München	DEL	46	12	10	22	38	4	0	0	0	2
2015–16	EHC Red Bull München	DEL	27	8	8	16	10	14	2	8	10	8
2016–17	EHC Red Bull München	DEL	52	12	29	41	16	14	3	7	10	2
2017–18	EHC Red Bull München	DEL	50	8	26	34	50	17	3	11	14	10
2018–19	EHC Red Bull München	DEL	52	10	17	27	38	17	0	4	4	22
2019–20	EHC Red Bull München	DEL	49	8	21	29	34	—	—	—	—	—
2020–21	EHC Red Bull München	DEL	38	9	18	27	47	2	0	0	0	2
2021–22	EHC Red Bull München	DEL	44	5	13	18	46	2	0	0	0	2
DEL totals			954	165	303	468	924	138	17	37	54	143

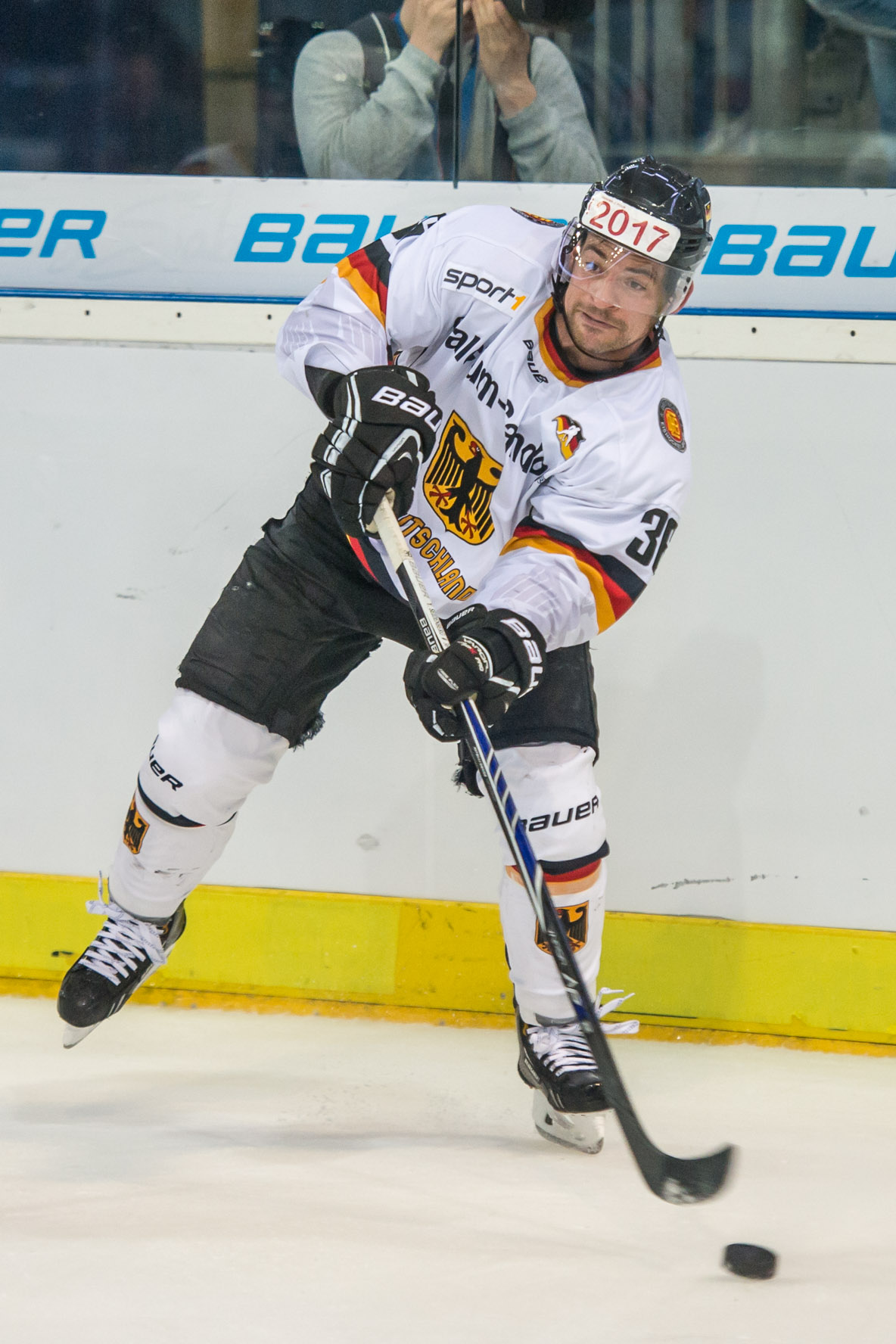
- Seidenberg in 2014

Medal record

Representing Germany

Ice hockey

Olympic Games
Silver medal – second place	2018 Pyeongchang	

=== International ===
Year	Team	Event	GP	G	A	Pts	PIM
2001	Germany	WJC18	6	1	0	1	2
2002	Germany	WJC18	8	2	6	8	4
2003	Germany	WJC	6	1	1	2	12
2004	Germany	WJC D1	5	0	2	2	8
2006	Germany	WC D1	5	2	2	4	10
2007	Germany	WC	1	0	0	0	0
2008	Germany	WC	6	1	2	3	4
2009	Germany	OGQ	3	2	0	2	2
2009	Germany	WC	4	0	1	1	2
2013	Germany	WC	7	0	0	0	4
2014	Germany	WC	7	0	0	0	2
2015	Germany	WC	7	0	1	1	0
2016	Germany	WC	8	0	1	1	6
2016	Germany	OGQ	3	0	1	1	2
2017	Germany	WC	8	2	2	4	0
2018	Germany	OG	7	1	0	1	4
2018	Germany	WC	7	2	3	5	2
2019	Germany	WC	8	0	3	3	2
Junior totals			25	4	9	13	26
Senior totals			81	10	16	26	40
