= Stefan Fonselius =

Finnish ice hockey linesman

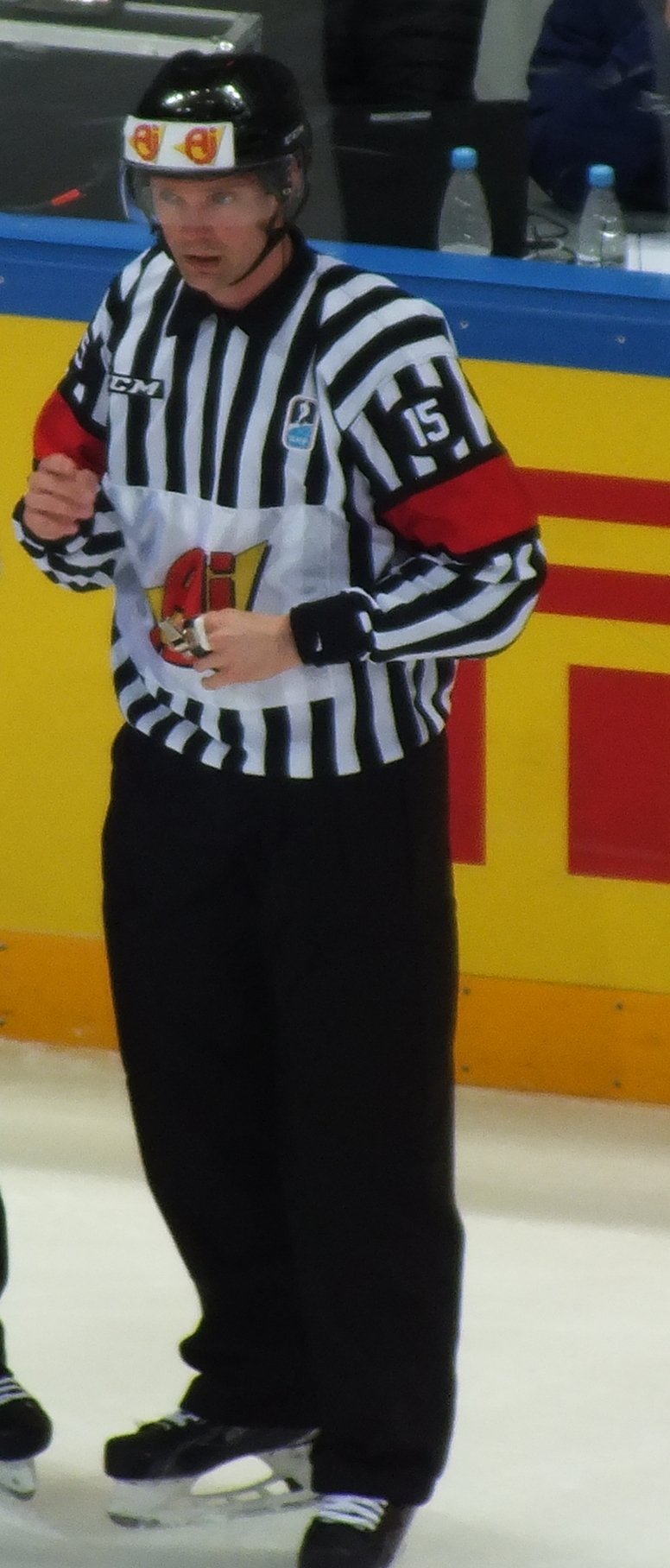
Stefan Fonselius

Stefan Fonselius (born September 19, 1976) is a Finnish ice hockey linesman who works in the SM-liiga. He has also officiated in the ice hockey at the 2010 Winter Olympics. He gained notoriety when he unwittingly took the Gold Medal-winning puck home with him to Turku, Finland before delivering it to the IIHF to be authenticated and sent to the Hockey Hall of Fame.
