= Antonín Jeřábek =

Czech ice hockey referee (born 1982)

Antonín Jeřábek (born 24 June 1982) is a Czech ice hockey referee.

== Career ==
Since 2006 he officiated in Extraliga. From 2014 he is a referee of Kontinental Hockey League (but he had already officiated 2 KHL games in the 2009/10 season, 2 games in the 2011/12 season and 2 games in the 2012/13 season). After the 2017/18 season he returned to Extraliga.

He has officiated games at the World Ice Hockey Championships in 2012 (where he worked the gold-medal game), 2013 (where he also worked the gold-medal game), 2014, 2016, 2017 (where he worked the gold-medal game), 2018, he was selected for the 2020 championship (but that year, it got cancelled because of the COVID-19 pandemic) and he also officiated at the 2021 championship.

He was selected to work games at the 2014 Winter Olympics in Sochi, Russia and at the 2018 Winter Olympics in Pyeongchang, South Korea.
