= 2019 National Hockey League All-Star Game =

Professional ice hockey exhibition game

2019 NHL All-Star Game

SAP Center, San Jose
- January 26, 2019
- Game one: Central 10 – 4 Pacific
- Game two: Metropolitan 7 – 4 Atlantic
- Game three: Metropolitan 10 – 5 Central
- MVP: Sidney Crosby (Metropolitan)
- Attendance: 17,562

The 2019 National Hockey League All-Star Game was held at SAP Center in San Jose, home of the San Jose Sharks on January 26, 2019. San Jose last held the NHL All Star Game in 1997. This was the fourth consecutive All-Star Game that used a four-team, 3-on-3, single elimination format, with one team representing each of the league's four divisions. After years of being held on a Sunday, the 2019 All-Star Game was played on a Saturday, January 26, at 5 p.m. PST/8 p.m. EST, while the Skills Competition was also moved from its traditional Saturday night to Friday, January 25, 2019.

The Metropolitan All-Stars won the All-Star Game, which was in its fourth straight year of a four-team, 3-on-3, single elimination format, with one team representing each of the league's four divisions. The team won $1 million (split 11 ways between the players). Sidney Crosby of the Pittsburgh Penguins was named the Most Valuable Player, scoring four goals and four assists. He received a new 2019 Honda Passport which he then proceeded to give to an Army veteran.

== Skills Competition ==
External videos
- 2019 All-Star Skills Competition
- Full replay (NBCSN's feed) on the NHL's official YouTube channel

The Skills Competition took place the day before the All-Star Game on Friday January 25, 2019 at the SAP Center. The winners of each event were awarded $25,000 in prize money.

The league invited Renata Fast and Rebecca Johnston from the Canadian Women's National Team, and Brianna Decker and Kendall Coyne Schofield from the U.S. Women's National Team, to demonstrate some of the events. After Nathan MacKinnon of the Colorado Avalanche (Central Division) pulled out of the fastest-skater event due to a bruised left foot, Coyne Schofield was named as his replacement, becoming the first woman to compete in the All-Stars skills competition.

Brianna Decker demonstrated the premier passer skill, but she was not part of the competition. She was, in fact, three seconds faster than Leon Draisaitl and would have won had her time been included as they did with Kendall Coyne Schofield. This prompted the hashtag #PayDecker on Twitter, as women's hockey salaries are a fraction of men's hockey salaries. On January 26, hockey equipment company CCM announced they would give Decker the $25,000 she would have received for winning the competition.

=== Results ===
==== Fastest Skater ====
External videos
- 2019 Fastest Skater
- NBCSN's feed on the NHL's official YouTube channel
- Sportsnet's feed on Sportsnet's official YouTube channel

Nat.	Player	Team	Division	Time (Seconds)
(Canada)	Connor McDavid	Edmonton Oilers	Pacific	13.378
(United States)	Jack Eichel	Buffalo Sabres	Atlantic	13.582
(Canada)	Mathew Barzal	New York Islanders	Metropolitan	13.780
(Finland)	Miro Heiskanen	Dallas Stars	Central	13.914
(Sweden)	Elias Pettersson	Vancouver Canucks	Pacific	13.930
(United States)	Cam Atkinson	Columbus Blue Jackets	Metropolitan	14.152
(United States)	Kendall Coyne	USA National Team	N/A	14.346
(United States)	Clayton Keller	Arizona Coyotes	Pacific	14.526

==== Puck Control Play ====
External videos
- 2019 Puck Control Play
- NBCSN's feed on the NHL's official YouTube channel
- Sportsnet's feed on Sportsnet's official YouTube channel

Nat.	Player	Team	Division	Time (Seconds)
(United States)	Johnny Gaudreau	Calgary Flames	Pacific	27.045
(United States)	Patrick Kane	Chicago Blackhawks	Central	28.611
(Canada)	Claude Giroux	Philadelphia Flyers	Metropolitan	30.270
(Canada)	Mark Scheifele	Winnipeg Jets	Central	32.161
(Sweden)	Gabriel Landeskog	Colorado Avalanche	Central	33.425
(Canada)	John Tavares	Toronto Maple Leafs	Atlantic	35.210
(Canada)	Jeff Skinner	Buffalo Sabres	Atlantic	35.407
(Sweden)	Elias Pettersson	Vancouver Canucks	Pacific	43.622

==== Save Streak ====
External videos
- 2019 Save Streak
- NBCSN's feed on the NHL's official YouTube channel
- Sportsnet's feed on Sportsnet's official YouTube channel

Nat.	Player	Team	Division	Division Faced	Save Streak
(Sweden)	Henrik Lundqvist	New York Rangers	Metropolitan	Atlantic	12
(Russia)	Andrei Vasilevskiy	Tampa Bay Lightning	Atlantic	Metropolitan	8
(Canada)	Devan Dubnyk	Minnesota Wild	Central	Pacific	7
(Canada)	Marc-Andre Fleury	Vegas Golden Knights	Pacific	Central	6
(United States)	John Gibson	Anaheim Ducks	Pacific	Central	3
(United States)	Jimmy Howard	Detroit Red Wings	Atlantic	Metropolitan	2
(Finland)	Pekka Rinne	Nashville Predators	Central	Pacific	2
(Canada)	Braden Holtby	Washington Capitals	Metropolitan	Atlantic	2

==== Premier Passer ====
External videos
- 2019 Premier Passer
- NBCSN's feed on the NHL's official YouTube channel
- Sportsnet's feed on Sportsnet's official YouTube channel

Nat.	Player	Team	Division	Time (Seconds)
(Germany)	Leon Draisaitl	Edmonton Oilers	Pacific	69.088
(Finland)	Sebastian Aho	Carolina Hurricanes	Metropolitan	78.530
(Canada)	Ryan O'Reilly	St. Louis Blues	Central	85.897
(United States)	Keith Yandle	Florida Panthers	Atlantic	94.611
(Canada)	Thomas Chabot	Ottawa Senators	Atlantic	100.568
(Switzerland)	Roman Josi	Nashville Predators	Central	107.128
(Sweden)	Erik Karlsson	San Jose Sharks	Pacific	118.824
(Finland)	Mikko Rantanen	Colorado Avalanche	Central	137.379

==== Hardest Shot ====
External videos
- 2019 Hardest Shot
- NBCSN's feed on the NHL's official YouTube channel
- Sportsnet's feed on Sportsnet's official YouTube channel

Nat.	Player	Team	Division	Speed (MPH)	
Nat.	Player	Team	Division	Attempt 1	Attempt 2
(United States)	John Carlson	Washington Capitals	Metropolitan	102.8 mph	100.8 mph
(Canada)	Brent Burns	San Jose Sharks	Pacific	0 (Miss)	100.6
(United States)	Seth Jones	Columbus Blue Jackets	Metropolitan	99.4	95.1
(Canada)	Steven Stamkos	Tampa Bay Lightning	Atlantic	96.2	93.1

==== Accuracy Shooting ====
External videos
- 2019 Accuracy Shooting
- NBCSN's feed on the NHL's official YouTube channel
- Sportsnet's feed on Sportsnet's official YouTube channel

Nat.	Player	Team	Division	Time (Seconds)
(Czech Republic)	David Pastrnak	Boston Bruins	Atlantic	11.309 seconds
(Canada)	Kris Letang	Pittsburgh Penguins	Metropolitan	12.693 seconds
(Canada)	Drew Doughty	Los Angeles Kings	Pacific	13.591 seconds
(United States)	Joe Pavelski	San Jose Sharks	Pacific	14.423 seconds
(United States)	Blake Wheeler	Winnipeg Jets	Central	18.585 seconds
(Russia)	Nikita Kucherov	Tampa Bay Lightning	Atlantic	19.706 seconds
(United States)	Kyle Palmieri	New Jersey Devils	Metropolitan	20.209 seconds
(United States)	Auston Matthews	Toronto Maple Leafs	Atlantic	35.626 seconds

== Rosters ==
As in the previous three All-Star Games, captaincy of each division was determined by a fan vote, the 2019 vote running from December 1, 2018, until December 23, 2018. On December 27, the four captains were announced by the NHL. For the third straight year, Connor McDavid of the Edmonton Oilers was selected to captain the Pacific Division, along with first time captains Auston Matthews of the Toronto Maple Leafs for the Atlantic Division and Nathan MacKinnon of the Colorado Avalanche for the Central Division. Alexander Ovechkin of the Washington Capitals was selected for the Metropolitan Division, but Ovechkin opted to abstain from the game to rest. Fans were also permitted, after most of the rest of the rosters were set, to vote for a "Last Man In" for each division. The Last Men In—Jeff Skinner (Atlantic), Gabriel Landeskog (Central), Kris Letang (Metropolitan) and Leon Draisaitl (Pacific)—were announced January 11.

On January 6, the coaches for the All-Star Game were announced, chosen from the team in each division with the highest points percentage through January 5, roughly the regular season's halfway point: Jon Cooper of the Tampa Bay Lightning (Atlantic), Todd Reirden of the Washington Capitals (Metropolitan), Paul Maurice of the Winnipeg Jets (Central), and Bill Peters of the Calgary Flames (Pacific).

=== Eastern Conference ===
Atlantic Division
Head coach: (Canada) Jon Cooper, Tampa Bay Lightning
Nat.	Player	Team	Pos.	#
(United States)	Auston Matthews (C)	Toronto Maple Leafs	F	34
(United States)	Jack Eichel	Buffalo Sabres	F	9
(Russia)	Nikita Kucherov	Tampa Bay Lightning	F	86
(Czech Republic)	David Pastrnak	Boston Bruins	F	88
(Canada)	Steven Stamkos	Tampa Bay Lightning	F	91
(Canada)	John Tavares	Toronto Maple Leafs	F	91
(Canada)	Jeff Skinner~	Buffalo Sabres	F	53
(Canada)	Thomas Chabot	Ottawa Senators	D	72
(United States)	Keith Yandle	Florida Panthers	D	3
(United States)	Jimmy Howard	Detroit Red Wings	G	35
(Russia)	Andrei Vasilevskiy†	Tampa Bay Lightning	G	88

- ^{~} Voted as "Last Man In".
- ^{†} Replaced Carey Price (Montreal Canadiens) due to injury.

Metropolitan Division
Head coach: (United States) Todd Reirden, Washington Capitals
Nat.	Player	Team	Pos.	#
(Finland)	Sebastian Aho	Carolina Hurricanes	F	20
(United States)	Cam Atkinson	Columbus Blue Jackets	F	13
(Canada)	Mathew Barzal	New York Islanders	F	13
(Canada)	Sidney Crosby^{*}	Pittsburgh Penguins	F	87
(Canada)	Claude Giroux	Philadelphia Flyers	F	28
(United States)	Kyle Palmieri‡	New Jersey Devils	F	21
(United States)	John Carlson	Washington Capitals	D	74
(United States)	Seth Jones	Columbus Blue Jackets	D	3
(Canada)	Kris Letang~	Pittsburgh Penguins	D	58
(Canada)	Braden Holtby	Washington Capitals	G	70
(Sweden)	Henrik Lundqvist	New York Rangers	G	30

- ^{~} Voted as "Last Man In".
- ^{†}Alexander Ovechkin (C) (Washington Capitals) opted to abstain from the game to rest.
- ^{‡} Replaced Taylor Hall (New Jersey Devils) due to injury.
- ^{*} Did not participate in Skills Competition due to illness.

=== Western Conference ===
Central Division
Head coach: (Canada) Paul Maurice, Winnipeg Jets
Nat.	Player	Team	Pos.	#
(Canada)	Nathan MacKinnon (C)^{*}	Colorado Avalanche	F	29
(United States)	Patrick Kane	Chicago Blackhawks	F	88
(Canada)	Ryan O'Reilly	St. Louis Blues	F	90
(Finland)	Mikko Rantanen	Colorado Avalanche	F	96
(Canada)	Mark Scheifele	Winnipeg Jets	F	55
(United States)	Blake Wheeler	Winnipeg Jets	F	26
(Sweden)	Gabriel Landeskog~	Colorado Avalanche	F	92
(Finland)	Miro Heiskanen	Dallas Stars	D	4
(Switzerland)	Roman Josi	Nashville Predators	D	59
(Canada)	Devan Dubnyk	Minnesota Wild	G	40
(Finland)	Pekka Rinne	Nashville Predators	G	35

- ^{~} Voted as "Last Man In".
- ^{*} Did not participate in Skills Competition or All-Star Games due to injury (still attended All-Star weekend). Replaced by Kendall Coyne Schofield in the Skills Competition.

Pacific Division
Head coach: (Canada) Bill Peters, Calgary Flames
Nat.	Player	Team	Pos.	#
(Canada)	Connor McDavid (C)	Edmonton Oilers	F	97
(United States)	Johnny Gaudreau	Calgary Flames	F	13
(United States)	Clayton Keller	Arizona Coyotes	F	9
(United States)	Joe Pavelski	San Jose Sharks	F	8
(Sweden)	Elias Pettersson	Vancouver Canucks	F	40
(Germany)	Leon Draisaitl~	Edmonton Oilers	F	29
(Canada)	Brent Burns	San Jose Sharks	D	88
(Canada)	Drew Doughty	Los Angeles Kings	D	8
(Sweden)	Erik Karlsson	San Jose Sharks	D	65
(Canada)	Marc-Andre Fleury	Vegas Golden Knights	G	29
(United States)	John Gibson	Anaheim Ducks	G	36

- ^{~} Voted as "Last Man In".

== Bracket ==
External videos
- 2019 NHL All-Star Game
- Full replay (NBC's feed) on the NHL's official YouTube channel

Semi-Finals		Final
Central	10
Pacific	4	Central	5
Metropolitan	7	Metropolitan	10
Atlantic	4

== Game summaries ==
=== First semifinal game ===
January 26, 2019	Central	10–4	Pacific	SAP Center	Recap
01:03 – Mikko Rantanen (1); 01:33 – Gabriel Landeskog (1); 05:08 – Roman Josi (1); 05:31 – Patrick Kane (1); 06:39 – Mark Scheifele (1); 07:50 – Mikko Rantanen (2); 08:11 – Patrick Kane (2)		First period	Erik Karlsson (1) – 04:51
00:42 – Gabriel Landeskog (2); 02:30 – Ryan O'Reilly (1); 04:36 – Gabriel Landeskog (3)		Second period	Johnny Gaudreau (1) – 04:47; Erik Karlsson (2) – 05:52; Brent Burns (1) – 06:02
No period		Third period	No period
Pekka Rinne 8 saves / 9 shots Devan Dubnyk 19 saves / 22 shots		Goalie stats	John Gibson 2 saves / 9 shots Marc-Andre Fleury 6 saves / 9 shots

=== Second semifinal game ===
January 26, 2019	Metropolitan	7–4	Atlantic	SAP Center	Recap
00:15 – Sidney Crosby (1); 01:56 – Seth Jones (1); 09:40 – Seth Jones (2)		First period	Jack Eichel (1) – 02:04; Steven Stamkos (1) – 03:13
03:37 – Sidney Crosby (2); 06:22 – Kris Letang (1); 08:08 – Sebastian Aho (1); 09:14 – Cam Atkinson (1)		Second period	Jeff Skinner (1) – 00:56; John Tavares (1) – 01:28
No period		Third period	No period
Henrik Lundqvist 5 saves / 7 shots Braden Holtby 11 saves / 13 shots		Goalie stats	Andrei Vasilevskiy 10 saves / 13 shots Jimmy Howard 9 saves / 13 shots

=== Final ===
January 26, 2019	Metropolitan	10–5	Central	SAP Center	Recap
00:22 – Mathew Barzal (1); 01:53 – Claude Giroux (1); 03:40 – Kris Letang (2); 08:16 – Kyle Palmieri (1); 09:55 – Sidney Crosby (3)		First period	No scoring
04:02 – Sidney Crosby (4); 05:35 – Sebastian Aho (2); 05:43 – Cam Atkinson (2); 07:16 – en – Mathew Barzal (2); 09:08 – Cam Atkinson (3)		Second period	Gabriel Landeskog (4) – 01:15; Mikko Rantanen (1) – 03:25; Ryan O'Reilly (2) – 04:38; Mikko Rantanen (3) – 08:30; Blake Wheeler (1) – 08:50
No period		Third period	No period
Henrik Lundqvist 6 saves / 6 shots Braden Holtby 12 saves / 17 shots		Goalie stats	Devan Dubnyk 6 saves / 11 shots Pekka Rinne 6 saves / 10 shots

== Uniforms ==
The All-Star uniforms for this game were created by Adidas Parley, the partnership between Adidas and the environmental organization Parley for the Oceans that produces products made with plastic ocean debris. Also for the first time, the uniforms featured each player's respective team logo on the front instead of the NHL shield or conference logo.

== Festivities and entertainment ==
This year's NHL Fan Fair, featuring various fan activities during All-Star Weekend, was held between Thursday, January 24 and Sunday, January 27 at the San Jose Convention Center.

Country music artist and former draft pick for the Vancouver Canucks Chad Brownlee performed the Canadian national anthem while pop singer and Fifth Harmony member Lauren Jauregui performed the U.S. national anthem. Singer Bebe Rexha performed during the second intermission. The Stanford Band also performed during the game.

== Television ==
The All-Star Game and skills competition were broadcast in the United States by NBC and NBCSN, respectively. In Canada, both the All-Star Game and skills competition were broadcast In English on both CBC and Sportsnet (under the Hockey Night in Canada branding), and on TVA Sports in French.

The NHL conducted a trial of player and puck tracking during the All-Star Game with technology developed by one of the German Fraunhofer Institutes using transmitters embedded inside pucks and jerseys. The technology enables on-air features such as speed displays, puck tracking graphics (reminiscent of the FoxTrax graphics utilized in the late 1990s by previous U.S. national NHL broadcaster Fox, developed by Sportvision), and marker graphics hovering above players. Using the system, NBC and Sportsnet both showcased some tracking data on their respective broadcasts, while NBC also offered a secondary broadcast of the game via its digital platforms to showcase expanded real-time statistics and other information. NHL Commissioner Gary Bettman stated during All-Star weekend that the league planned to deploy the system to all 31 NHL arenas prior to the start of the 2019–20 NHL season.
