= Adidas Parley =

Collection of clothing and footwear

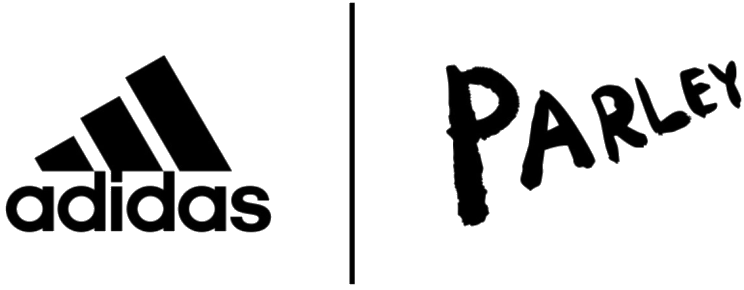

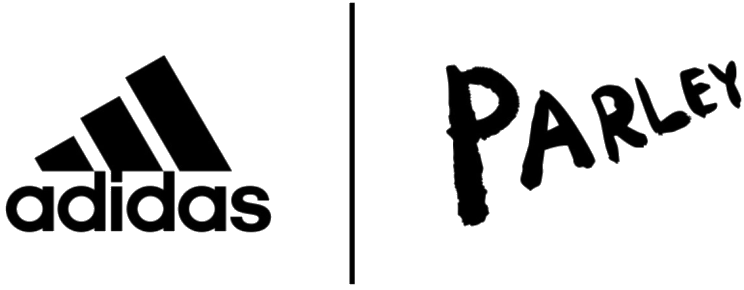
- Type: Clothing and footwear made with recycled plastic
- Inventor: Adidas; Parley for the Oceans
- Inception: 2015; 11 years ago
- Manufacturer: Adidas
- Website: adidas.com/parley

Adidas Parley is a collection of clothing and footwear originated from the collaboration of German multinational company Adidas and Parley for the Oceans, an organization that addresses environmental threats towards the oceans, through plastic pollution.

Since the first collection launched in 2015, Adidas Parley products are produced with recycled plastic which helps to mitigate the amount of plastic which ends up in the ocean plastic ocean debris. Adidas recreated three editions of their UltraBoost shoe, and a new version of their Adidas Originals shoe.

== History ==
=== Origins ===
Eric Liedtke, the executive of Adidas in 2015, chose to use recycled plastics in the production of the Adidas Parley shoes, as he felt that there were many potential applications for its use and that it would also serve as part of a solution to the ocean plastic problem. This formed the start of a long term initiative project by Adidas to eliminate new plastic from its supply chain and to expand its plastic cultivation to more athletic product lines. Adidas has used recycled polyester and sustainable cotton in previous athletic products, but these production runs are small in comparison to their ocean-bound plastic shoe initiative.

=== Collaboration ===
Parley for the Oceans (Parley) is Adidas' partner in the Parley A.I.R Strategy, which turns plastic waste into thread that is woven into running shoes. The Adidas-Parley shoe silhouettes were re-designed with knitted uppers and decorative stitching, all made from recycled, ocean-bound plastic collected by Parley. The outsole is made from recycled and re-ground rubber.

Additionally, Adidas has worked with Parley to create mass-produced performance football products with the debut of the Adidas x Parley Real Madrid, FC Bayern Munich and Manchester United FC home jerseys collaboration. For the 2015 to 2018 seasons, Adidas released limited amount of Parley jersey's for select Major League Soccer (MLS) clubs. In 2019 Adidas partnered again with the MLS to release Parley jerseys for each MLS club in limited quantities.

As part of their collaboration, Adidas and Parley for the Oceans held the "Run for the Oceans" event in summer of 2017, with the intention that this would raise awareness of their products as well as ocean conservation.

== Models ==
=== UltraBoost Uncaged Parley ===
The "UltraBOOST Uncaged Parley" was sold for $220 a unit. Adidas then released an updated version of a 1990s shoe made with yarns made from waste plastic. The UltraBoost shoes used materials from 11 recycled ocean-bound plastic bottles per pair in the shoe laces, heel linings, and sock liner covers.

=== Parley swimming collection ===
Adidas created Parley swimwear, using plastic recycled into the technical yarn fibre Econyl, a branded yarn composed of at least 50% salvaged fishing nets and post-consumer carpets, which offers the same properties as the regular nylon used to make swimwear. 76 per cent of the collection also incorporates recycled polyamide.
