= Gabriel Landeskog =

Swedish ice hockey player (born 1992)

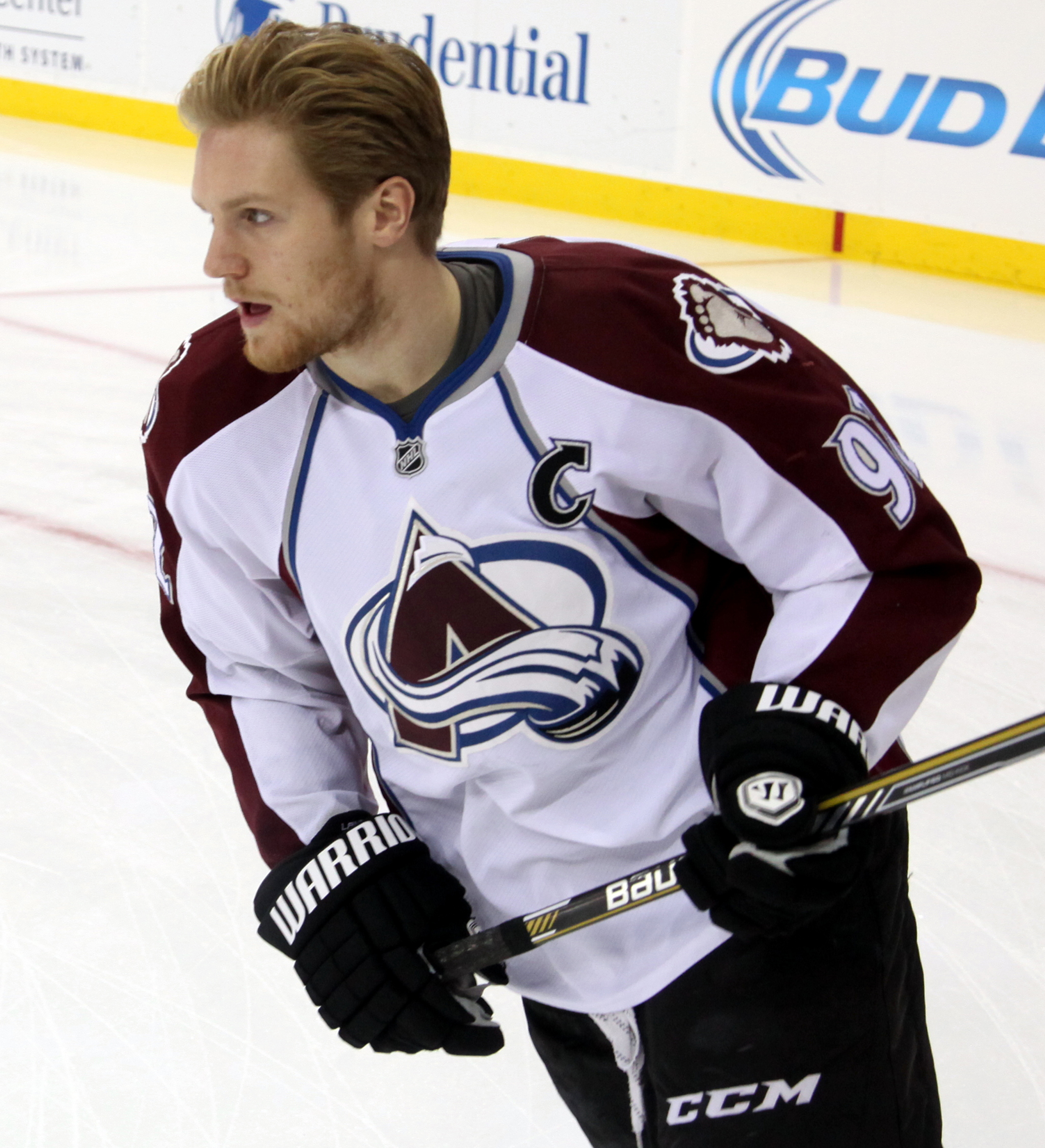
- Landeskog with the Colorado Avalanche in November 2014
- Born: 23 November 1992 (age 33) Stockholm, Sweden
- Height: 6 ft 1 in (185 cm)
- Weight: 216 lb (98 kg; 15 st 6 lb)
- Position: Left wing
- Shoots: Left
- NHL team Former teams: Colorado Avalanche; Djurgårdens IF
- National team: Sweden
- NHL draft: 2nd overall, 2011; Colorado Avalanche
- Playing career: 2009–present

Gabriel Ingemar John Landeskog (pronounced [ˈɡɑ̂ːbrɪɛl ˈlânːdɛˌskuːɡ]; born 23 November 1992) is a Swedish professional ice hockey player who is a left winger and captain for the Colorado Avalanche of the National Hockey League (NHL).

He was selected second overall in the 2011 NHL entry draft by Colorado. On 4 September 2012, Landeskog was named the fourth captain in Colorado Avalanche history, at the time becoming the youngest captain in NHL history at 19 years and 286 days. He won the Stanley Cup with the Colorado Avalanche in 2022. Landeskog played through serious injury during the championship season, the aftermath of which kept him out of playing for nearly three seasons.

== Playing career ==
=== Djurgårdens IF ===
Landeskog began his youth career in hockey playing for Hammarby IF. After a successful season for Djurgårdens IF in the J20 SuperElit, Landeskog debuted in Elitserien on 21 February 2009, in a game against Brynäs IF, which Djurgårdens IF lost 4–2. At 16 years and 90 days he became the youngest player in Djurgårdens IF's history, and one of the youngest to ever have played in Elitserien. He recorded his first point in Elitserien on 24 February, in his second game, a 2–2 tie against Skellefteå AIK.

=== Kitchener Rangers ===
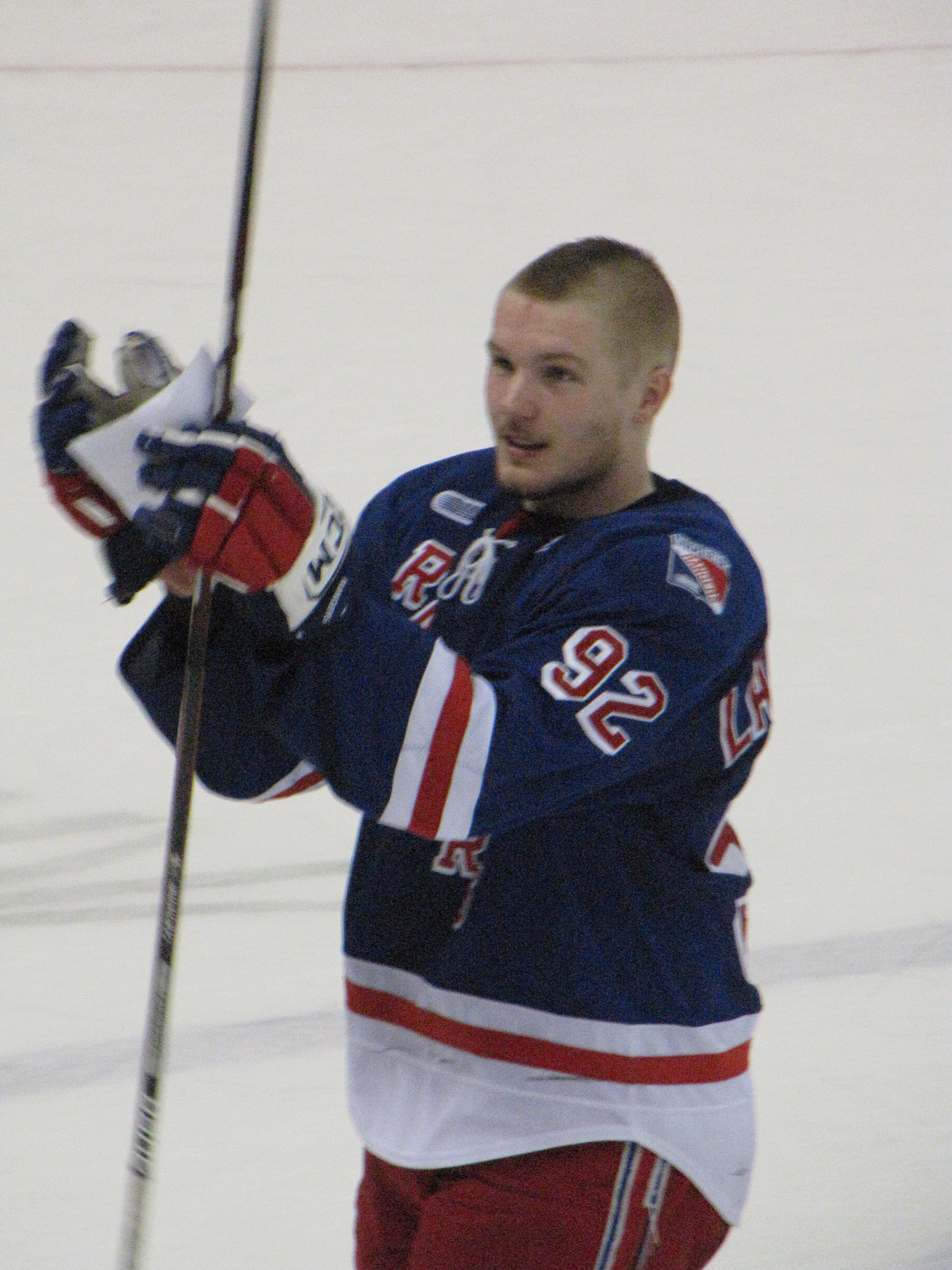
Landeskog with the Kitchener Rangers in 2010

Landeskog was initially drafted in the first round, third overall, by the Plymouth Whalers of the Ontario Hockey League (OHL) in the 2009 CHL Import Draft. However, he never played for the team as his CHL rights were traded to the Kitchener Rangers on 3 August 2009.

By the end of the 2009–10 season, Landeskog was third among OHL rookies in points (trailing Matt Puempel and Boone Jenner) and goals (trailing Puempel and Ivan Telegin). In the playoffs, Kitchener made it to the conference finals where they were eliminated by Windsor, and Landeskog was third overall on his team as well as the highest scoring rookie ahead of teammate Ryan Murphy.

On 24 October 2010 Landeskog was named captain of the Kitchener Rangers for the 2010–11 season. This announcement made him the first European captain in franchise history. During his final season before NHL draft eligibility, despite suffering an ankle injury which shortened his campaign to 53 regular season games, he led all Rangers with 37 goals and a plus-minus of 27. During the playoffs, Landeskog posted a team-high 10 points in a seven-game first-round series defeat to the Plymouth Whalers to end his junior career.

=== Colorado Avalanche ===
==== 2011–2012: Rookie season, Calder Trophy ====
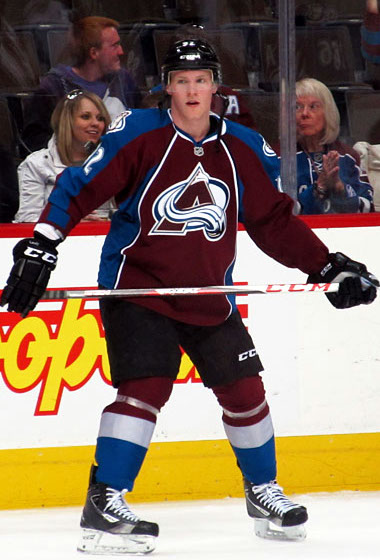
Landeskog with the Avalanche in his rookie season.

Landeskog was drafted second overall by the Colorado Avalanche in the 2011 NHL entry draft, behind Red Deer center Ryan Nugent-Hopkins. Upon being drafted, Landeskog tied Daniel Sedin and Victor Hedman as the third-highest Swedish draft pick in history. A few days later, the Kitchener Rangers dropped Landeskog from their roster in anticipation of him making the Avalanche out of training camp. As OHL teams were only allowed a small number of European players on their roster, they dropped him to open up space to draft a new player in the OHL import draft. After attending the Avalanche's training camp, Landeskog signed a three-year, entry-level contract with the Avalanche that carried a base salary of $925,000 and an additional $850,000 signing bonus. Landeskog made his NHL debut on 8 October in the Avalanche's opening-night game against the Detroit Red Wings. He finished with five shots on net through 16:03 minutes of ice time while playing on a line with Ryan O’Reilly and Daniel Winnik. Upon making his debut, he become became the first player in Avalanche franchise history to wear jersey number 92, a choice he made in honour of his birth year. While playing with O'Reilly and Winnik, Landeskog scored his first NHL goal on 12 October 2011, against the Columbus Blue Jackets. At 18 years and 324 days, he surpassed Victor Hedman to become the youngest Swedish-born player to score an NHL goal. Later that month, Landeskog recorded his first multi-goal game in a 5–4 shootout win over the Chicago Blackhawks. However, his production remained inconsistent until late December as he grew more confident in his abilities and acclimated to the NHL level. By mid-January, Landeskog had recorded nine goals and 22 points through his first 48 games.

As a result of his efforts, Landeskog was named to Team Chara at the 2012 National Hockey League All-Star Game. After tallying only three points at the start of February, Landeskog recorded five goals and five assists through a six-game point streak to end the month as the league's leading rookie. As such, he was recognized as the NHL's Rookie of the Month. He continued his scoring streak into March and tallied goals in two of the Avalanche's three game road trip against Buffalo, New Jersey, and the New York Rangers. On 12 March 2012, Landeskog recorded his first overtime goal and his 233rd shot on net to break Peter Šťastný's franchise record for most shots on goal in a player's rookie season. Landeskog finished his rookie season leading all rookies with 22 goals and tied Nugent-Hopkins with 52 points. He subsequently became the first Avalanche player since 1999 to win the Calder Memorial Trophy as the NHL's Rookie of the Year. Landeskog was also named to the NHL All-Rookie Team.

==== 2012–2021: Captaincy, continued improvement ====
Following his rookie season, the Avalanche named Landeskog as team captain, at the time making him the youngest captain in NHL history. At 19 years and 286 days, Landeskog was 11 days younger than Sidney Crosby when he was named captain of the Pittsburgh Penguins. However, because of the 2012–13 NHL lockout, he was unable to play a game as captain until 19 January 2013. When the NHL lockout was in effect, Landeskog returned to Sweden to begin the season with Djurgårdens IF. In 17 games with Djurgårdens IF, Landeskog produced six goals for 14 points before returning to North America on 3 December 2012. Once the lockout concluded, Landeskog recorded one goal in four games before suffering a head injury during a game against the San Jose Sharks on 26 January. He missed 11 games to recover before returning to the Avalanche's lineup on 22 February 2013. Landeskog later wrote about his experience with his concussion in a Players' Tribune article and urged younger players to "understand the complexity" and effects of concussions. Due to his injury and the shortened nature of the 2012–13 season, Landeskog was limited to 17 points in 36 games. After the Avalanche were eliminated from playoff contention and the regular season ended, Landeskog represented Sweden senior team at the 2013 World Championship and captured a gold medal. On 15 August 2013, the Avalanche signed Landeskog to a seven-year contract extension worth $39 million.

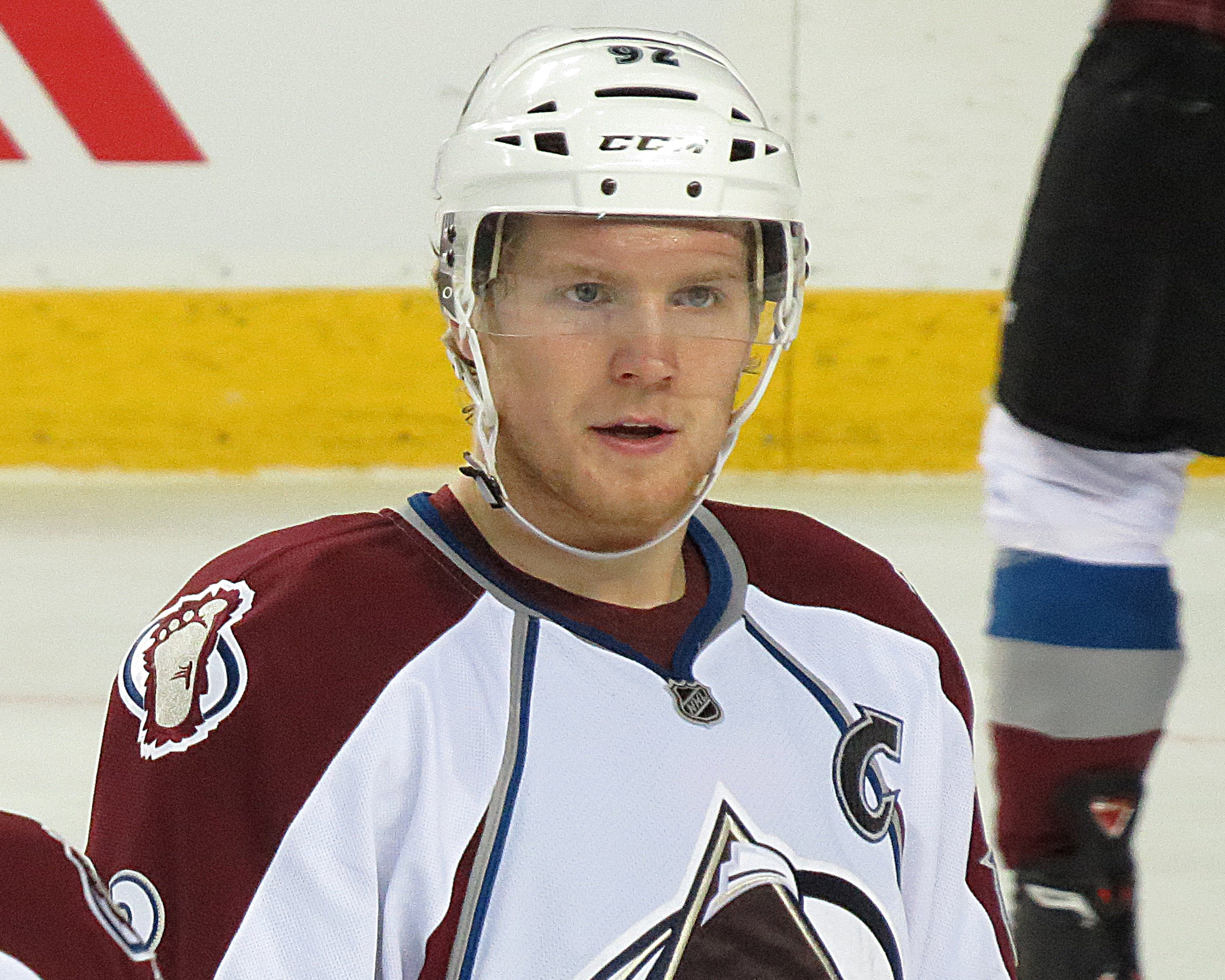
Landeskog in 2013.

Landeskog proved to be a significant piece of a resurgent Colorado Avalanche team during the 2013–14 season. He put up career highs in goals, assists, and points, helping the Avalanche to a division title. He scored his first career NHL playoff goal on 17 April 2014, against Ilya Bryzgalov of the Minnesota Wild.

On 3 March 2015, Landeskog was fined $5,000 for punching Mikko Koivu with 3.3 seconds remaining in a game against the Minnesota Wild. Landeskog had been given a misconduct penalty at the time. On 13 November 2015, Landeskog was suspended two game for an illegal check to the head on Boston Bruins forward Brad Marchand. On 10 March 2016, Landeskog was suspended for three games without pay due to him cross-checking Simon Després in the neck area with his stick during a game. While he had not been penalized for the play at the time, the Department of Player Safety determined it was a punishable offence upon review.

Landeskog began the 2016–17 season tied for second on the team in points while playing with his usual linemates, Nathan MacKinnon and Mikko Rantanen. However, after scoring an empty-net goal against the Los Angeles Kings on 15 November, Landeskog suffered a lower body injury and was placed on the team's injured reserve list. He missed 10 games to recover from the injury and returned to the Avalanche's lineup on 10 November for their game against the Montreal Canadiens. Landeskog finished the 2016-17 regular season with 18 goals and 15 assists through 72 games and was named to Team Sweden's roster for the 2017 IIHF World Championship. Despite his efforts, the Avalanche finished the season with the franchise’s worst record since moving to Denver.

Landeskog recorded his first career hat trick in a 6–2 win over the Washington Capitals on 17 November 2017. A few weeks later, Landeskog was suspended for four games and forfeited $119,815.68 in salary for cross-checking Matthew Tkachuk during a game. He recorded his second career hat trick on 16 December 2017 in a 6–5 loss to the Tampa Bay Lightning. Landeskog played in his 500th career NHL game on 26 March 2018 in a 4-1 loss against the Vegas Golden Knights. The Avalanche qualified for the 2018 Stanley Cup playoffs but lost to the Nashville Predators in six games.

Landeskog recorded his third career hat trick in a 5–3 win over the New Jersey Devils on 18 October 2018. He ended the week leading the NHL in goals and was selected as the NHL's First Star of the Week. He was later one of three Avalanche players who were selected to participate in the 2019 NHL All-Star Game. It was the first NHL All-Star Game of his career. Landeskog finished the 2018–19 NHL season with a career-high 34 goals and 41 assists.

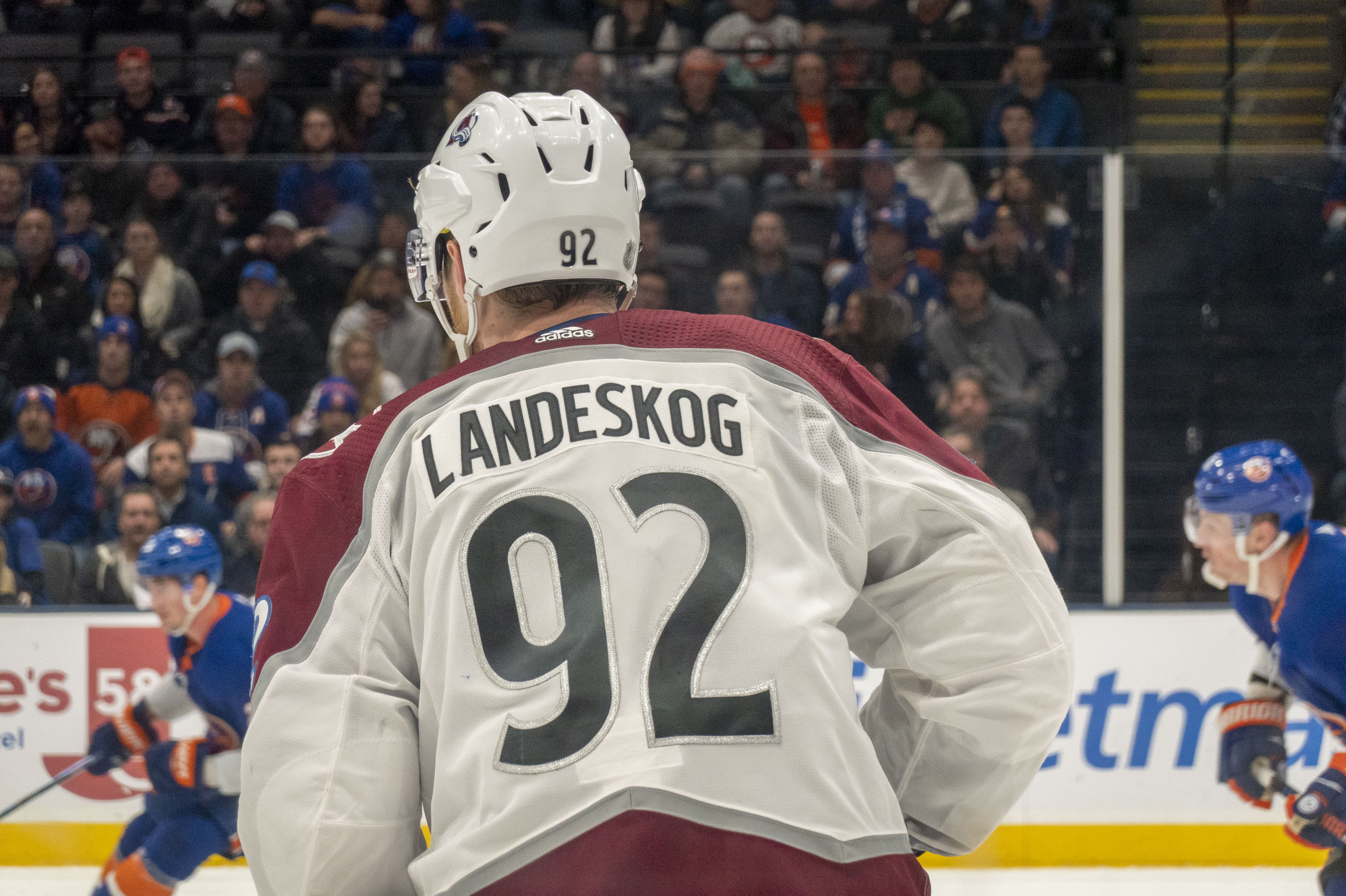
Landeskog during a game against the Islanders in January 2020.

Landeskog was recognized as the NHL's Second Star of the Week on 2 March after recording nine points over four games. In the following week, Landeskog tallied his 20th goal of the season to pass Peter Forsberg and Paul Stastny on the Avalanche's all-time list for most 20 goals seasons. In game six of the 2020 Stanley Cup playoffs, Cale Makar's skate blade accidentally cut Landeskog's knee. After medical evaluation, he skated one 16-second shift in the third period but was unable to play out the remainder of the game. The cut resulted in a cartilage injury on the bottom of his patella.

On 16 January 2021, Landeskog scored his 200th career NHL goal to help lift the team to an 8–0 win over the St. Louis Blues. On 4 February, Landeskog entered the NHL's COVID-19 protocols and the team's contest against the Minnesota Wild was postponed due to numerous other players also being unavailable. He missed over two weeks to recover and played on the third line in his first game back on 21 February against the Vegas Golden Knights.

==== 2021–2025: Stanley Cup, injury troubles, and missed seasons ====
On 27 July 2021, the day before becoming a free agent for the first time in his NHL career, Landeskog signed an eight-year, $56 million contract extension to stay with the Avalanche. He started the 2021–22 season with four goals and six assists through his first seven games of the season. On 13 October, he was suspended for two games after boarding Kirby Dach of the Chicago Blackhawks. On 3 November, he became the sixth Avalanche player in history to record 300 assists with the franchise. A few weeks later, he played in his 700th career NHL game on 23 November against the Ottawa Senators. On 7 January 2022, Landeskog recorded his fourth career hat trick in a 7-1 win over the Winnipeg Jets. He added one more goal and three assists by the end of the week to be recognized as the NHL's First Star of the Week ending on 9 January. However, Landeskog was unable to build upon this momentum as he was entered into the NHL's COVID-19 protocols the next day. He missed three games before returning to the Avalanche's top line with MacKinnon and Rantanen on 15 January for a game against the Arizona Coyotes. Landeskog tallied an assist in the team's 5–0 win to extend his 15-game personal point streak, while the three forwards combined for seven points. Landeskog led the team in scoring with 30 goals and ranked fifth in points with 59 before undergoing knee surgery in March 2022. At the time, there was no timeline for his return to the lineup and the team was unsure if he would be available for the 2022 Stanley Cup playoffs. Despite missing Landeskog, the Avalanche finished the regular season first in the Central Division and Western Conference.

After missing the Avalanche's final 23 games of the regular season, Landeskog returned for the Western Conference first round against the Nashville Predators. He recorded a goal and an assist in game one and four points in game three to help the Avalanche sweep the Predators. Landeskog and the Avalanche then faced the St. Louis Blues for the second consecutive season. Landeskog recorded three goals over six games to help the Avalanche advance to the Western Conference Finals for the first time since 2002. After sweeping the Edmonton Oilers in four games, the Avalanche faced the Tampa Bay Lightning in the 2022 Stanley Cup Final. Landeskog scored the Avalanche's first goal of the Finals in the first period of game one to tie Valeri Kamensky for the seventh most playoff goals in Avalanche/Nordiques history. After also tallying an assist, he clinched sixth place on the franchise's all-time list for multi-point games in the playoffs. While the series was pushed to six games, Landeskog recorded an assist on Nathan MacKinnon's game-tying goal in game six to help the team clinch the 2022 Stanley Cup. Landeskog subsequently became the fourth NHL player born and trained outside of North America to captain a team to the Stanley Cup, joining Alexander Ovechkin, Zdeno Chára, and Nicklas Lidström.

Landeskog underwent arthroscopic knee surgery following the Stanley Cup win and was expected to miss at least twelve weeks of the 2022–23 season. He missed the entire season, including the playoffs. In May 2023, the Avalanche reported that Landeskog's right knee required a cartilage transplant surgery, as a result of which he missed the entire 2023–24 season and the following regular season.

==== 2025–present: Return from injury ====
On 9 April 2025, Landeskog was loaned to the Colorado Eagles, the Avalanche's American Hockey League (AHL) affiliate, for a conditioning assignment. He played his first professional game since 26 June 2022, a span of 1,020 days, on 11 April, in the Eagles' 2–0 win against the Henderson Silver Knights. On 23 April 2025, the Avalanche announced Landeskog would play his first NHL game in 3 years during the first round of the 2025 Stanley Cup playoffs against the Dallas Stars. He recorded his first goal in 1,041 days in a 4–0 Avalanche win in game four, though the Avalanche would ultimately lose to the Stars in seven games. In recognition of his efforts to return to the league, Landeskog was named a finalist for the 2024–25 Bill Masterton Memorial Trophy, awarded by the Professional Hockey Writers Association to "the player who best exemplifies the qualities of perseverance, sportsmanship and dedication to hockey."

In the 2025–26 season, Landeskog resumed a regular role with the Avalanche. He recorded his first regular-season goal in 1,347 days during a 4–1 win against the Anaheim Ducks on 11 November. He missed time in January and February after breaking ribs, and later required surgery after a groin injury caused by a slap shot impact. In his first regular season since 2021–22, Landeskog ultimately appeared in 60 games, managing 14 goals and 21 assists. The Avalanche had a 45–7–8 record when Landeskog was in the lineup and a 10–9–3 record in games in which he did not play. He was named a finalist for the Masterton Trophy for the second consecutive season, and would be named the winner on June 9. On the same day, he received the Mark Messier Leadership Award, given to "the player who exemplifies great leadership qualities to his team, on and off the ice."

== International play ==
Medal record

Men's ice hockey

Representing Sweden

Olympic Games
Silver medal – second place	2014 Sochi	

World Championships
Gold medal – first place	2013 Sweden/Finland	
Gold medal – first place	2017 Germany/France	

In December 2009, Landeskog was left off Sweden junior team's roster for the 2010 World Junior Championships. Landeskog's rise was rewarded the following season as he was named an alternate captain for the 2011 World Junior Championships, but only played one game before he was sidelined with a high ankle sprain.

Landeskog played for Sweden senior team in the 2012 World Championship and was named an alternate captain for that tournament. He was Sweden's second-youngest player in the tournament, about eight months older than Jonas Brodin. Upon the conclusion of his second consecutive season with the Avalanche out of the playoffs, Landeskog was added to the Swedish squad for the 2013 World Championship. In 10 games, Landeskog contributed with three goals and four points in helping Sweden claim the gold over Switzerland senior team, becoming the first host team in 27 years to do so.

In July 2013, Landeskog was one of 35 players invited to the Swedish Ice Hockey Association's orientation camp for the 2014 Winter Olympics. He was later included in the final squad and helped Sweden claim a silver medal in a 3–0 loss to defending champions Canada senior team.

Landeskog won his second gold medal with Sweden at the 2017 World Championship. He tallied two goals and three assists through 10 games.

He also competed for Sweden at the 2026 Winter Olympics.

== Personal life ==
Landeskog is the son of former defenceman Tony Landeskog, who works in the insurance business; his mother Cecilia is a chef and cooking instructor. He has an older brother, Adam Landeskog, born in 1990, as well as a twin sister Beatrice in Stockholm, Sweden. He moved to Canada by himself at age 16 in time for the 2009–10 OHL season.

Landeskog and his wife have three children.

Landeskog is a minority shareholder in the Premier League soccer club Leeds United.

== Career statistics ==
=== Regular season and playoffs ===
			Regular season					Playoffs
Season	Team	League	GP	G	A	Pts	PIM	GP	G	A	Pts	PIM
2007–08	Djurgårdens IF	J18	13	7	9	16	2	—	—	—	—	—
2007–08	Djurgårdens IF	J18 Allsv	10	5	1	6	2	2	0	0	0	0
2007–08	Djurgårdens IF	J20	1	0	0	0	0	—	—	—	—	—
2008–09	Djurgårdens IF	J18	5	4	5	9	39	—	—	—	—	—
2008–09	Djurgårdens IF	J18 Allsv	3	1	2	3	2	2	0	0	0	0
2008–09	Djurgårdens IF	J20	31	7	14	21	63	6	1	0	1	8
2008–09	Djurgårdens IF	SEL	3	0	1	1	2	—	—	—	—	—
2009–10	Kitchener Rangers	OHL	61	24	22	46	51	20	8	15	23	18
2010–11	Kitchener Rangers	OHL	53	36	30	66	61	7	6	4	10	2
2011–12	Colorado Avalanche	NHL	82	22	30	52	51	—	—	—	—	—
2012–13	Djurgårdens IF	Allsv	17	6	8	14	32	—	—	—	—	—
2012–13	Colorado Avalanche	NHL	36	9	8	17	22	—	—	—	—	—
2013–14	Colorado Avalanche	NHL	81	26	39	65	71	7	3	1	4	8
2014–15	Colorado Avalanche	NHL	82	23	36	59	79	—	—	—	—	—
2015–16	Colorado Avalanche	NHL	75	20	33	53	69	—	—	—	—	—
2016–17	Colorado Avalanche	NHL	72	18	15	33	62	—	—	—	—	—
2017–18	Colorado Avalanche	NHL	78	25	37	62	37	6	4	3	7	8
2018–19	Colorado Avalanche	NHL	73	34	41	75	51	12	3	5	8	10
2019–20	Colorado Avalanche	NHL	54	21	23	44	47	14	2	11	13	12
2020–21	Colorado Avalanche	NHL	54	20	32	52	34	10	4	9	13	9
2021–22	Colorado Avalanche	NHL	51	30	29	59	78	20	11	11	22	6
2024–25	Colorado Eagles	AHL	2	1	1	2	2	—	—	—	—	—
2024–25	Colorado Avalanche	NHL	—	—	—	—	—	5	1	3	4	0
2025–26	Colorado Avalanche	NHL	60	14	21	35	47	13	6	5	11	14
NHL totals			798	262	344	606	648	87	34	48	82	67

=== International ===
Year	Team	Event	Result	GP	G	A	Pts	PIM
2009	Sweden	U18	5th	6	4	0	4	24
2011	Sweden	WJC	4th	1	1	1	2	0
2012	Sweden	WC	6th	8	1	4	5	6
2013	Sweden	WC	1st place, gold medalist(s)	10	3	1	4	18
2014	Sweden	OG	2nd place, silver medalist(s)	6	0	1	1	4
2016	Sweden	WCH	3rd	4	1	0	1	2
2017	Sweden	WC	1st place, gold medalist(s)	10	2	3	5	2
2019	Sweden	WC	5th	5	2	5	7	0
2026	Sweden	OG	7th	5	2	2	4	0
Junior totals				7	5	1	6	24
Senior totals				48	11	16	27	32

== Awards and honours ==
Award	Year	Ref
OHL
OHL First All-Rookie Team	2010	
NHL
NHL's Rookie of the Month	February 2012	
NHL All-Rookie Team	2012	
Calder Memorial Trophy	2012	
NHL All-Star Game	2019	
Stanley Cup champion	2022	
Bill Masterton Memorial Trophy	2026	
Mark Messier Leadership Award	2026	

Awards and achievements
Preceded by Jeff Skinner	Winner of the Calder Trophy; 2012	Succeeded by Jonathan Huberdeau
Preceded by Joey Hishon	Colorado Avalanche first-round draft pick 2011	Succeeded by Duncan Siemens
Preceded by Sean Monahan	Bill Masterton Memorial Trophy; 2026	Succeeded by Incumbent
Sporting positions
Preceded by Milan Hejduk	Colorado Avalanche captain 2012–present	Incumbent
