= Cyrill Gutsch =

German-born designer, Parley for the Oceans founder

Cyrill Gutsch is a German-born designer and brand developer based in New York. After working as a designer for companies including Lufthansa, BMW, and Adidas, a 2012 meeting with Paul Watson prompted Gutsch to found Parley for the Oceans.

== Early life ==
Gutsch grew up in the Black Forest in Germany, where he received strict education about recycling and not wasting water. He has stated that he was cynical about these things, believing it to be "a lost cause".

== Career ==
After doing design work for companies including Lufthansa, BMW, and Adidas, a meeting with Paul Watson prompted Gutsch to start Parley for the Oceans in 2012.

Gutsch spoke at the United Nations in June 2018, where he argued that "we have to let plastic go". He appeared in the Netflix documentary Seaspiracy. In September 2021, he spoke at the Business Fashion Environment Summit organized by Vogue Poland.

== Recognition ==
In 2018, Gutsch and Parley for the Oceans received the Special Recognition Award for Innovation at The Fashion Awards.
