= Kyle Palmieri =

American ice hockey player (born 1991)

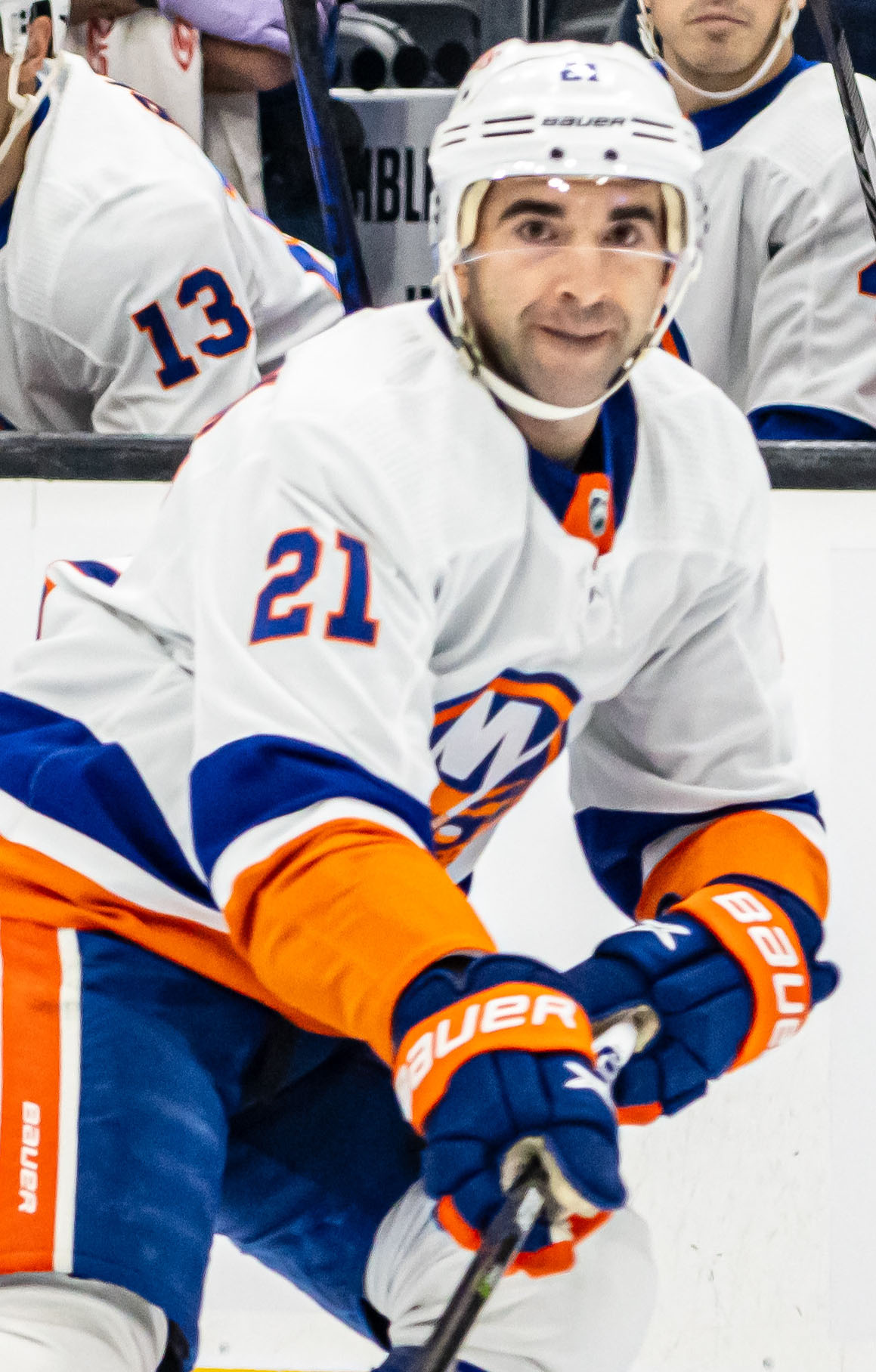
- Palmieri with the New York Islanders in November 2023
- Born: February 1, 1991 (age 35) Smithtown, New York, U.S.
- Height: 5 ft 11 in (180 cm)
- Weight: 191 lb (87 kg; 13 st 9 lb)
- Position: Forward
- Shoots: Right
- NHL team Former teams: New York Islanders; Anaheim Ducks; New Jersey Devils
- National team: United States
- NHL draft: 26th overall, 2009; Anaheim Ducks
- Playing career: 2010–present

Kyle Charles Palmieri (/pɔːlˈmɛri/; born February 1, 1991) is an American professional ice hockey player who is a forward and alternate captain for the New York Islanders of the National Hockey League (NHL). He previously played for the New Jersey Devils and Anaheim Ducks.

Growing up on Long Island, Palmieri played youth hockey for the Devils-sponsored teams at Codey Arena in West Orange, New Jersey. He attended St. Peter's Preparatory School for two years before earning an opportunity to play for the USA Hockey National Team Development Program (NTDP). During his time in the program, he tallied 15 goals and 15 assists through 33 games. As a result of his play, Palmieri was drafted in the first round, 26th overall, by the Anaheim Ducks in the 2009 NHL entry draft. After being released from the NTDP, Palmieri played one season of college hockey for the University of Notre Dame Fighting Irish.

Palmieri spent one season with the Fighting Irish before turning professional with the Ducks' American Hockey League (AHL) affiliate, the Syracuse Crunch. He split his first three seasons with the team between the Crunch and the Ducks before becoming a mainstay on the NHL level. Following his fifth season with the team, Palmieri was traded to the New Jersey Devils in exchange for second and third-round draft picks in the 2015 NHL entry draft. Palmieri continued to produce while with the Devils and set numerous career-highs over six seasons. After spending six seasons with the Devils, Palmieri was traded to the New York Islanders.

Internationally, Palmieri has represented the United States at both the junior and senior levels.

== Early life ==
Palmieri was born on February 1, 1991, in Smithtown, New York, to parents Bruce and Tammy. After marrying, his parents spent a few years in Smithtown, where Kyle and his three older siblings were born, before moving to Montvale, New Jersey, when Kyle was four. His godfather is former shortstop Bud Harrelson, who is his father's cousin. His father worked in home construction and spent several years in Mattituck, on the north fork of Long Island. Palmieri began playing ice hockey at a friend's house when he was five years old. He began playing with the Kodiak Hockey Club at McKay Ice Arena under coach Gary Hess.

== Playing career ==
=== Amateur ===
Growing up, Palmieri played youth hockey for the New Jersey Devils-sponsored teams at Codey Arena in West Orange, New Jersey. He also played in the 2004 Quebec International Pee-Wee Hockey Tournament with the New Jersey Devils minor ice hockey team. At the age of 14, Palmieri joined the 16U Junior Devils organization. Afterward, he attended St. Peter's Preparatory School for two years. During his sophomore season, Palmieri led the Gordon Conference with 58 points and earned a first-team All-State selection. He finished his career-best season helping them to the New Jersey state final, where they lost to St. Augustine Preparatory School. As a result of his play, Palmieri earned an opportunity to play for the USA Hockey National Team Development Program (NTDP) in Ann Arbor, Michigan.

Upon joining the NTDP under-18 team, Palmieri tallied 15 goals and 15 assists through 33 games and recorded a hat-trick in the gold medal round of the 2008 Five Nations tournament. As a result of his play, Palmieri was drafted by the Guelph Storm in the sixth round of the 2008 Ontario Hockey League (OHL) draft, but never reported to the team. He returned to the NTDP for the 2008–09 season, where he was ranked 20th amongst all North American skaters by the NHL Central Scouting Bureau. However, Palmieri was released from the team for violating team rules, and he subsequently played college ice hockey for the University of Notre Dame Fighting Irish. During his first and only season with the team, he scored nine goals in 33 games. During this time, Palmieri was drafted 26th overall by the Anaheim Ducks in the 2009 NHL entry draft.

=== Professional ===
==== Anaheim Ducks ====
Following the 2009–10 season, Palmieri signed a three-year entry-level contract with the Anaheim Ducks and participated in their Rookie Tournament. He was soon reassigned to the Ducks' American Hockey League (AHL) affiliate, the Syracuse Crunch, to begin the 2010–11 season. In his first month with the team, Palmieri tallied six points in three games to help the team to a 1–1–1–0 record. By November, he had tallied seven goals and nine points in nine games to earn his first recall to the NHL level. Palmieri made his NHL debut on November 3, 2010, against the Tampa Bay Lightning and he scored his first career goal to lead the Ducks to an overtime win. Palmieri spent 10 games with the Ducks before being reassigned to the Syracuse Crunch. In January, he was chosen to compete for Team USA at the 2011 World Junior Ice Hockey Championships. In his final 14 games with the Crunch, Palmieri tallied 15 goals and 20 points to earn the AHL's Rookie of the Month accolade for the month of March. He attributed much of his success to his linemate Nick Bonino, who had recorded 14 assists and 18 points during the same stretch. As a result of his offensive success, Palmieri was selected for the 2011 AHL Eastern Conference All-Star Team.

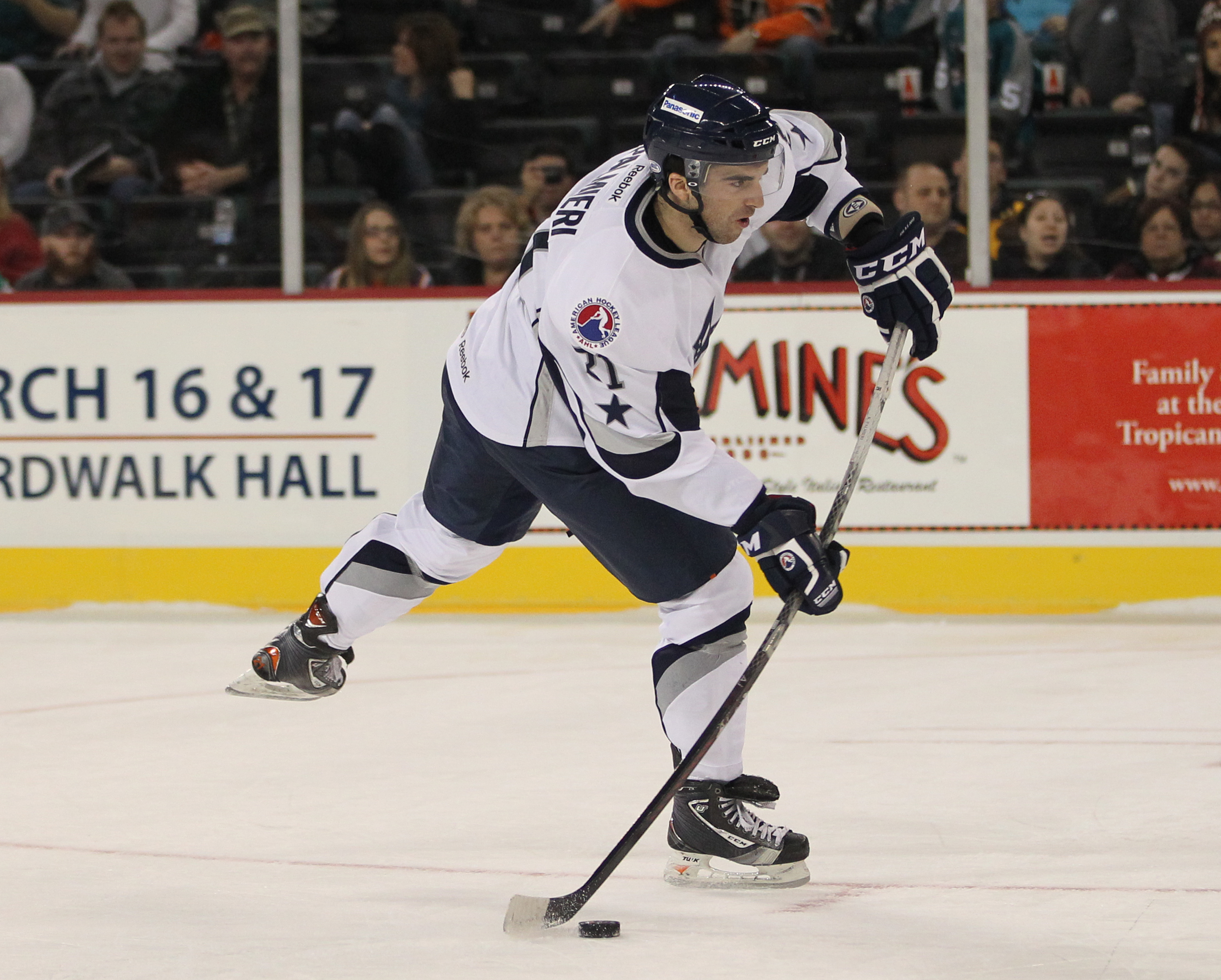
Palmieri during the AHL All-Star Game in January 2012

Palmieri returned to the Ducks organization the following season and participated in their training camp. He was returned to the AHL to begin the season, where he played on their top line alongside Nick Bonino and Patrick Maroon. Palmieri began the season strong and scored six points, including a hat-trick, in his first two games of the 2011–12 season. As such, he was named the AHL Player of the Week for the period ending October 16, 2011. Palmieri continued to produce as the season continued and he tallied 26 points prior to his NHL recall on December 9. At the time of his recall, he also led the league in goals, ranked fourth in scoring, co-led in game-winning goals, and ranked second in plus-minus. After playing in seven games for the Ducks, Palmieri was returned to the AHL, where he was selected for the 2012 AHL All-Star Classic. As his sophomore season continued, Palmieri reached new career-highs after collecting 54 points through 42 games. He remained with the Crunch until March 12 when he was recalled to the NHL level. Upon re-joining the Ducks, Palmieri became the first Anaheim rookie since Matt Beleskey to score two goals in a game. He competed in seven contests with the Ducks before being reassigned to the AHL. Palmieri finished the AHL regular season with 33 goals and 25 assists through 51 games as the Crunch qualified for the 2012 Calder Cup playoffs.

As a result of the 2012–13 NHL lockout, Palmieri split the 2012–13 season between the Ducks and their new AHL affiliate, the Norfolk Admirals. While playing with the Admirals, Palmieri tallied 13 goals and 12 assists for 25 points before being promoted to the NHL level once the lockout ended. On February 28, Palmieri became the second-youngest Ducks player to record a hat-trick in a 5–1 win over the Nashville Predators. He finished the season with 21 points through 42 regular season games before playing in all seven Western Conference Quarterfinal games against the Detroit Red Wings. Once the playoffs concluded, it was revealed that Palmieri played through a shoulder injury. Despite this, coach Bruce Boudreau called his season "adequete." On July 26, Palmieri signed a three-year contract extension to remain with the Ducks organization.

The 2013–14 season was Palmieri's first full-time NHL campaign, and he set career-highs in goals, assists, and points. Following an injury to Dustin Penner mid-game, Palmieri was placed on the Ducks' top line alongside Corey Perry and Ryan Getzlaf. On October 30, Palmieri recorded his fourth multi-goal game to help the Ducks come back from a 2–0 deficit against the Philadelphia Flyers. In his first game in his hometown New Jersey on November 4, Palmieri scored the game-winning goal at 9:09 into the first period and was named the game's third star. He finished the season with 31 points through 71 games as the Ducks qualified for the 2014 Stanley Cup playoffs. During Round 1 against the Dallas Stars, Palmieri scored one goal before being pulled from the lineup in Game 4. He remained out the Ducks' lineup until Game 3 of Round 2 against the Los Angeles Kings. Once the Ducks were eliminated by the Kings in Game 7, Palmieri ended the postseason with three goals and 14 penalty minutes through nine games.

In the second year of his new contract, Palmieri missed the majority of the Ducks' pre-season games due to a high ankle sprain. However, he was healthy enough to participate in two full practices with the Ducks before the season began. After missing 18 games, Palmieri made his season debut and started strong by recording two goals in four games. By December, he had tallied five goals and nine points through 15 games before being placed on injured reserve due to him aggravating his shoulder. When he returned to the lineup on January 2, he scored his sixth goal of the season to beat the St. Louis Blues 4–3.

==== New Jersey Devils ====
On June 26, 2015, Palmieri was traded by the Ducks to his hometown club, the New Jersey Devils, in exchange for second and third-round picks in the 2015 NHL entry draft. As a result of the trade, Palmieri re-joined coach John Hynes, who had coached him with the UNTDP from 2007 to 2009. In his first season with the Devils, Palmieri set new career-highs and led the Devils with 30 goals and 57 points. As such, Palmieri signed a five-year $23.25 million contract extension to remain with the Devils organization on July 7, 2016.

Following the signing, Palmieri joined Team USA at the 2016 World Cup of Hockey, where they failed to medal. He subsequently returned to the Devils organization and participated in training camp. Throughout the season, he played alongside Taylor Hall and Travis Zajac while maintaining a 13.5 shot percentage. Palmieri continued his scoring streak throughout the season and had tallied 18 goals through 33 games with 13 regular season games remaining in the season. He subsequently finished the season with a team-leading 26 goals and 27 assists.

During the 2017 off-season, Palmieri moved to Boston for his off-season training alongside Jimmy Hayes, Brian Boyle, Nick Lappin, and Brian Gibbons. He began the season with the Devils but suffered an injury during the season opener against the Colorado Avalanche. Upon returning to the Devils' lineup after missing one game, Palmieri slid into his previous spot on the top line alongside Taylor Hall and Pavel Zacha. On October 13, Palmieri tallied the 100th goal of his career in a 5–2 loss to the Washington Capitals. A few weeks later, Palmieri slid into the boards during practice and missed nearly three weeks to recover. During that time, the Devils won three games and lost two, with one game going to overtime. He returned to the lineup on November 9 and continued to produce offensively. He accumulated four goals and five assists in 13 games before suffering a broken foot during a game against the Minnesota Wild in late November. Palmieri remained out of the Devils lineup until after the Christmas break for precautionary reasons. During a 4–3 win over the Carolina Hurricanes on March 27, Palmieri tallied his 10th multi-point game of the season and led the club in power play goals with 11. As a result of his production, Palmieri helped the Devils win 40 regular season games for the first time since 2011–12. They eventually qualified for the 2018 Stanley Cup playoffs following a 2–1 win over the Toronto Maple Leafs on April 5. The Devils met with the Tampa Bay Lightning in the first round but were eliminated from playoff contention after falling 3–1 in Game 5.

Palmieri and the Devils began the 2018–19 season in Sweden against the Edmonton Oilers for the 2018 NHL Global Series. During the game, Palmieri tallied two goals for his 15th career multi-goal game and 10th with the Devils. Upon returning to North America, Palmieri became the first player in franchise history to score at least two goals in each of their first two games of a season. He repeated this feat the following game against the San Jose Sharks to become the fourth player in NHL history to score multiple goals in at least three consecutive games to open a season. Although his two-goal streak concluded in the fourth game of the season, Palmieri became the first player in NHL history to score the opening goal in four consecutive games to begin a season. As well, he became the third player to score a power-play goal in each of his team's first four games in a season. Throughout the 2018–19 season, Palmieri continued to contribute offensively while playing on the wing of Taylor Hall and Nico Hischier. As a member of the Devils' top line, he led New Jersey with 22 goals and 38 points by January. After Hall stepped down from the 2019 National Hockey League All-Star Game due to an injury, Palmieri was named his replacement. Upon rejoining the Devils, Palmieri returned to their top line with Marcus Johansson and Nico Hischier. He continued to lead the team in scoring with 26 goals and 22 assists through 63 games before suffering a lower-body injury during a game against the Montreal Canadiens. He subsequently returned to the lineup on March 8 and played on a line with Travis Zajac and Kenny Agostino for their game against the Capitals. Palmieri finished the season with 27 goals and 23 assists for 50 points through 74 games.

Upon rejoining the Devils for the 2019–20 season, Palmieri reached the 500-game plateau, becoming one of three active players on New Jersey's roster to have reached the milestone. On October 30, 2019, Palmieri tallied his first hat-trick with the Devils in an overtime loss to the Tampa Bay Lightning. By December, Palmieri led all Devils players in scoring with 27 points in 38 games, while playing alongside Jesper Bratt and Nico Hischier. As such, he was named to his second All-Star Game in a row. However, Palmieri was replaced by Hischier after he suffered an injury blocking a shot during a win over the Tampa Bay Lightning. While Palmieri missed four games to recover from the injury, the Devils struggled offensively and won only one game during his absence. Despite his injury, Palmieri finished the regular season with a team-leading 25 goals and 45 points through 65 games. During this time, he also accrued 11 power-play goals and 18 power-play points while averaging 17:07 of ice time.

When NHL play resumed in January, Palmieri returned to the Devils to play in his 11th NHL season. On January 31, Palmieri was placed on the NHL's COVID protocol list and missed a matinee game on the road against the Buffalo Sabres. As numerous other teammates tested positive for COVID, the Devils entered a 14-day pause to comply with NHL COVID-19 protocols before returning on February 16.

==== New York Islanders ====
After tallying 17 points through 34 games, Palmieri was traded to the New York Islanders along with Travis Zajac in exchange for a first-round pick in the 2021 NHL entry draft, a conditional 2022 fourth-round pick, and forwards A. J. Greer and Mason Jobst. Upon joining the Islanders, Palmieri was reunited with former teammate Andy Greene. In the Islanders' final regular season game on May 8, Palmieri and teammate Mathew Barzal tallied a goal each 37 seconds apart in the third period to win 5–1 over the Devils. Through 17 games with the Islanders, Palmieri recorded two goals and two assists as the Islanders qualified for the 2021 Stanley Cup playoffs.

During Game 1 of the 2021 Stanley Cup playoffs against the Pittsburgh Penguins, Palmieri played on the right wing of Jean-Gabriel Pageau and rookie Oliver Wahlstrom. Palmieri scored two goals in Game 1, including the overtime game-winner, to lead the Islanders 4–3 over the Penguins. As such, he became the first Long Island-born player to score a postseason goal for the Islanders and the first Islander to score two goals in his playoff debut. Palmieri and the Islanders beat the Penguins 6–3 in Game 6 to qualify for the Second Round against the Boston Bruins. During their series against the Bruins, Palmieri's four goals and six points were tied for the team lead in scoring. In Game 6, Palmieri extended his point streak to five games by tallying seven goals in his first 12 playoff games. After the Islanders beat the Bruins in six games, Palmieri and the Islanders met the Tampa Bay Lightning for the Semifinals. During most of their series against the Lightning, Palmieri played on the Islanders third line alongside Pageau and Zajac but earned time of the first line during Game 4. Despite this, the Islanders were eventually eliminated from playoff contention in seven games by the Lightning.

On September 1, 2021, Palmieri was re-signed to a four-year, $20 million contract by the Islanders. After skating in 25 games, and tallying seven points, Palmieri suffered a lower body injury on December 16. He returned to practice on January 3 but remained listed as day-to-day. On March 2, 2024, Palmieri recorded his third career hat-trick in a 5–1 win against the Bruins.

On May 30, 2025, the Islanders re-signed Palmieri to a two-year, $9.5 million contract extension.

During the second period of a November 28, 2025, game against the Flyers, Palmieri collided with Flyers' defenseman Jamie Drysdale while trying to retrieve the puck in the offensive zone. After struggling back to his feet, he skated toward the Islanders' bench, stole the puck from Flyers' player, passed it to Jonathan Drouin, who touch-passed to Emil Heineman, who scored. The next day, the team announced Palmieri had torn his left anterior cruciate ligament (ACL) and would miss the next six to eight months.

== International play ==
Medal record

Men's ice hockey

Representing the United States

World Junior Championships
Gold medal – first place	2010 Canada	
Bronze medal – third place	2011 United States	

World U18 Championships
Bronze medal – third place	2008 Russia	

Internationally, Palmieri has represented the United States at both the junior and senior levels. His first international tournament was the 2007 under-17 Four Nations tournament, where he scored two goals in three games. Following this, Palmieri competed at the 2008 Five Nations tournament, where he scored a hat-trick to lead the United States to a gold medal. In the same year, Palmieri also represented the United States under-18 team at the 2008 World U18 Championships where he won a bronze medal. Palmieri next represented the United States junior team at the 2010 World Junior Ice Hockey Championships during his freshman year at Notre Dame. He finished third on the team in scoring with one goal and eight assists to help the team win a gold medal. Palmieri subsequently became the first Notre Dame player to capture a gold medal in World Junior Championship play. His final tournament at the junior level was the 2011 World Junior Championships where he earned a bronze medal. In the second game of the tournament, Palmieri scored two goals and an assist to beat Slovakia 6–1 and was named his team's player of the game.

Palmieri made his debut with the United States senior team at the 2012 World Championship, where he tallied two goals in seven games. He was later named to the United States roster for the 2016 World Cup of Hockey as a replacement for Ryan Callahan.

== Personal life ==
Palmieri married his wife Ashlee in July 2019 at Macari Vineyards in Mattituck, New York. His older sister Taylor and brother-in-law Stephen Ficchi are both members of the United States Army. His sister is a member of the New York Army National Guard while Stephen is a United States Army Rangers. As a result of this, Palmieri launched Squad21 to offer active or veteran military service members the chance to attend a Devils home game during the 2016–17 regular season. This expanded into the Kyle Palmieri Foundation, a charitable organization that supports three military nonprofits, in 2018. He also held an annual Military Ball that included an auction. Palmieri subsequently became the Devil's 2018 nominee for the King Clancy Memorial Trophy as a player "who best exemplifies leadership qualities on and off the ice and has made a noteworthy humanitarian contribution in his community."

In 2019, Palmieri, Scott Wilson, Jeff Francoeur, and the players' associations for NHL, MLB, and NFL players, filed a complaint against the city of Pittsburgh for their nonresident sports facility usage fee. The complaint contended that the city made out-of-state athletes pay a fee equal to 3% of their taxable earned income for the days in which they play games in publicly funded sports facilities.

== Career statistics ==
=== Regular season and playoffs ===
			Regular season					Playoffs
Season	Team	League	GP	G	A	Pts	PIM	GP	G	A	Pts	PIM
2006–07	St. Peter's Preparatory School	HS-NJ	—	34	28	62	—	—	—	—	—	—
2006–07	New Jersey Devils Youth 16U AAA	AYHL	18	18	19	37	30	—	—	—	—	—
2007–08	U.S. NTDP U17	USDP	7	5	0	5	8	—	—	—	—	—
2007–08	U.S. NTDP U18	USDP	27	9	9	18	20	—	—	—	—	—
2007–08	U.S. NTDP U18	NAHL	32	15	10	25	43	—	—	—	—	—
2008–09	U.S. NTDP U18	NAHL	5	1	1	2	2	—	—	—	—	—
2008–09	U.S. NTDP U18	USDP	28	14	14	28	49	—	—	—	—	—
2009–10	University of Notre Dame	CCHA	33	9	8	17	36	—	—	—	—	—
2010–11	Syracuse Crunch	AHL	62	29	22	51	56	—	—	—	—	—
2010–11	Anaheim Ducks	NHL	10	1	0	1	0	1	0	0	0	0
2011–12	Syracuse Crunch	AHL	51	33	25	58	53	4	1	1	2	0
2011–12	Anaheim Ducks	NHL	18	4	3	7	6	—	—	—	—	—
2012–13	Norfolk Admirals	AHL	33	13	12	25	54	—	—	—	—	—
2012–13	Anaheim Ducks	NHL	42	10	11	21	9	7	3	2	5	4
2013–14	Anaheim Ducks	NHL	71	14	17	31	38	9	3	0	3	14
2014–15	Norfolk Admirals	AHL	2	0	0	0	4	—	—	—	—	—
2014–15	Anaheim Ducks	NHL	57	14	15	29	37	16	1	3	4	4
2015–16	New Jersey Devils	NHL	82	30	27	57	39	—	—	—	—	—
2016–17	New Jersey Devils	NHL	80	26	27	53	46	—	—	—	—	—
2017–18	New Jersey Devils	NHL	62	24	20	44	30	5	1	2	3	6
2018–19	New Jersey Devils	NHL	74	27	23	50	42	—	—	—	—	—
2019–20	New Jersey Devils	NHL	65	25	20	45	41	—	—	—	—	—
2020–21	New Jersey Devils	NHL	34	8	9	17	18	—	—	—	—	—
2020–21	New York Islanders	NHL	17	2	2	4	2	19	7	2	9	10
2021–22	New York Islanders	NHL	69	15	18	33	57	—	—	—	—	—
2022–23	New York Islanders	NHL	55	16	17	33	24	6	2	3	5	4
2023–24	New York Islanders	NHL	82	30	24	54	26	5	1	2	3	12
2024–25	New York Islanders	NHL	82	24	24	48	20	—	—	—	—	—
2025–26	New York Islanders	NHL	25	6	12	18	8	—	—	—	—	—
NHL totals			925	276	269	545	443	68	18	14	32	54

=== International ===
Year	Team	Event	Result	GP	G	A	Pts	PIM
2008	United States	U17	2nd place, silver medalist(s)	6	2	1	3	6
2008	United States	WJC18	3rd place, bronze medalist(s)	7	2	2	4	4
2010	United States	WJC	1st place, gold medalist(s)	7	1	8	9	4
2011	United States	WJC	3rd place, bronze medalist(s)	6	2	4	6	0
2012	United States	WC	7th	7	2	2	4	8
2016	United States	WCH	7th	2	0	0	0	0
Junior totals				26	7	15	22	14
Senior totals				9	2	2	4	8

== Awards and honors ==
Award	Year	Ref
NHL
NHL All-Star Game	2019	

Awards and achievements
Preceded by Peter Holland	Anaheim Ducks first-round draft pick 2009	Succeeded by Cam Fowler
