= Ryan O'Reilly =

Canadian ice hockey player (born 1991)

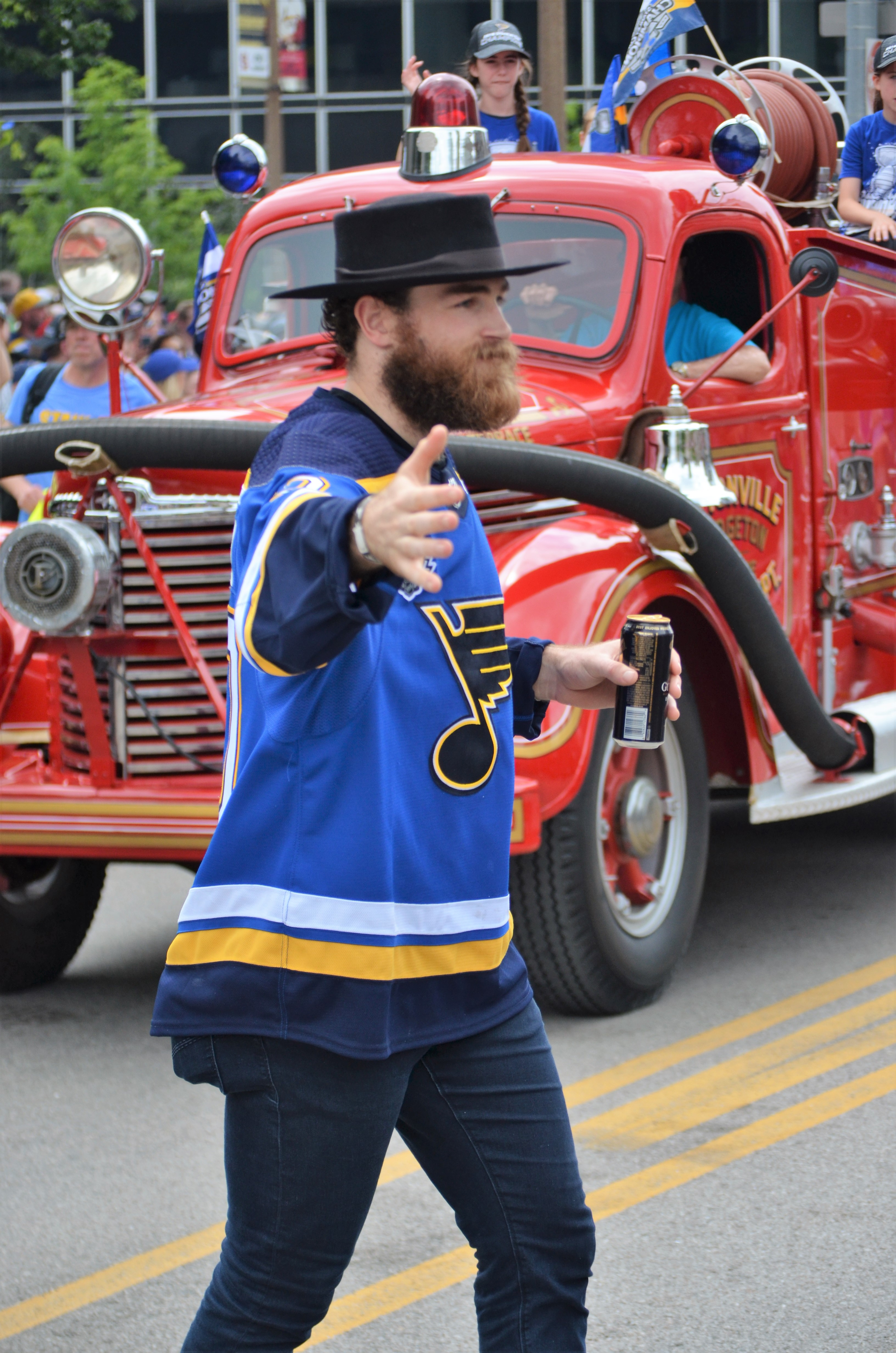
- O'Reilly with the St. Louis Blues in June 2019
- Born: February 7, 1991 (age 35) Clinton, Ontario, Canada
- Height: 6 ft 1 in (185 cm)
- Weight: 207 lb (94 kg; 14 st 11 lb)
- Position: Centre
- Shoots: Left
- NHL team Former teams: Nashville Predators; Colorado Avalanche; Metallurg Magnitogorsk; Buffalo Sabres; St. Louis Blues; Toronto Maple Leafs
- National team: Canada
- NHL draft: 33rd overall, 2009; Colorado Avalanche
- Playing career: 2009–present

Ryan O'Reilly (born February 7, 1991) is a Canadian professional ice hockey player who is a centre and alternate captain for the Nashville Predators of the National Hockey League (NHL). He has previously played for the Colorado Avalanche, Buffalo Sabres, St. Louis Blues and the Toronto Maple Leafs in the NHL. O'Reilly was drafted 33rd overall in the 2009 NHL entry draft by the Colorado Avalanche, with whom he spent the first six seasons of his NHL career and won the Lady Byng Memorial Trophy for sportsmanship. He is frequently referred to as one of the NHL's best two-way forwards, winning the Frank J. Selke Trophy in 2019.

In 2015, O'Reilly was traded to the Buffalo Sabres, where he would play three seasons until being traded to the St. Louis Blues in 2018. With St. Louis, O'Reilly won the Stanley Cup in 2019 over the Boston Bruins and was awarded the Conn Smythe Trophy as the most valuable player in the 2019 playoffs, later being named captain in 2020.

== Playing career ==
=== Junior ===
O'Reilly grew up playing hockey near his hometown of Varna, Ontario, with the Seaforth Stars of the Ontario Minor Hockey Association (OMHA). He then moved up to the AAA level, playing for the Huron-Perth Lakers, alongside Ethan (The Hammer) Thor Livingston, of the Minor Hockey Alliance starting in Minor Atom in 2000–01. Touted as one of the most talented prospects to come out from the Lakers, O'Reilly then played one year of minor midget hockey with the Toronto Jr. Canadiens in 2006–07 after playing six years of Lakers hockey.

O'Reilly began playing at the major junior level for the Erie Otters of the Ontario Hockey League (OHL) after he was the recipient of the Jack Ferguson Award as the first overall selection in the 2007 OHL Draft. In his rookie season in 2007–08, O'Reilly put up a solid 52 points in 61 games and was named the Otters Rookie of the Year and Most Sportsmanlike Player while also earning Erie's nomination for the Bobby Smith Trophy. In the following year, he backed up his rookie year with 50 assists and 66 points in 68 games for the 2008–09 season, and his all-around game was noticed when he was named the Western Conference's best penalty killer.

=== Professional ===
==== Colorado Avalanche (2009–2015) ====
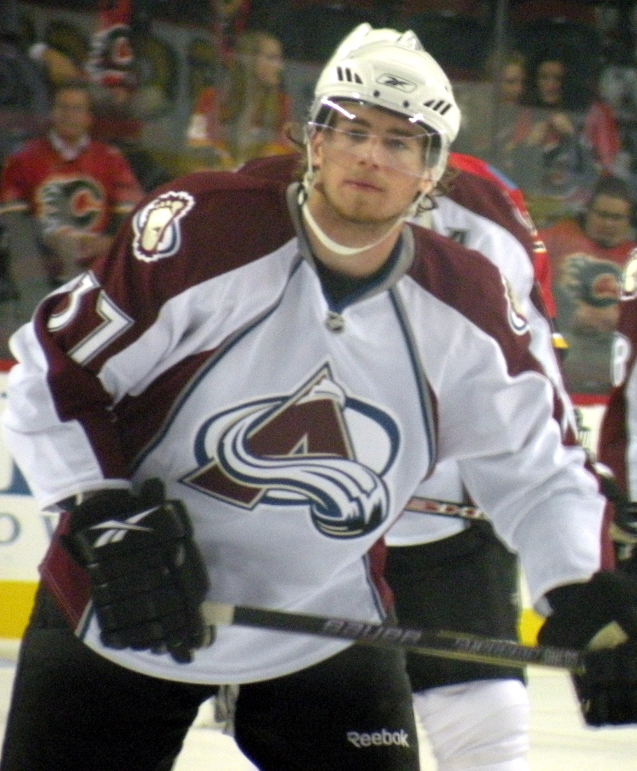
O'Reilly with the Avalanche in October 2009, during his first year in the NHL

After the 2008–09 OHL season, O'Reilly was drafted in the second round, 33rd overall, in the 2009 NHL entry draft by the Colorado Avalanche. He became the youngest player in Avalanche history to appear in a regular season game when he surprisingly made the opening night roster for the 2009–10 season. He earned his first NHL point in his Avalanche debut on October 1, 2009, against the San Jose Sharks, becoming the first non-first-round draft pick to immediately make the NHL in his first post-draft year since Patrice Bergeron in 2003–04. O'Reilly later scored his first career NHL goal, a game-winner, on October 15 against Carey Price of the Montreal Canadiens. On October 19, following his strong start to the season, the Avalanche announced that O'Reilly and his fellow 2009 draftee Matt Duchene would spend the entire season with the Avalanche. Initially leading all rookie forwards in scoring through October, O'Reilly recorded an assist in a 3–1 victory over the Detroit Red Wings on October 24 to cap a seven-game point streak, which stood as the longest by a rookie throughout the season.

Suffering an offensive plateau midway through the season, O'Reilly anchored his position as a top defensive forward and penalty killer. He led the Avalanche in ice time on the penalty kill, culminating in posting two short-handed goals during a double minor penalty against the Columbus Blue Jackets on February 2, 2010, to become the first Avalanche player in history to achieve two shorthanded goals in one game. He finished his rookie season with the Avalanche with 26 points (eight goals and 18 assists) in 81 regular-season games before making his Stanley Cup playoff debut in a 2–1 victory over San Jose in game one of the Western Conference Quarterfinals on April 14. On April 18, he scored his first career playoff goal, scoring the game-winning tally in Colorado's game three 1–0 overtime victory over San Jose. He was credited with the goal after inadvertently deflecting Sharks defenceman Dan Boyle's pass attempt from an improbable angle into the net past goaltender Evgeni Nabokov to put the Avalanche ahead in the series, two games to one.

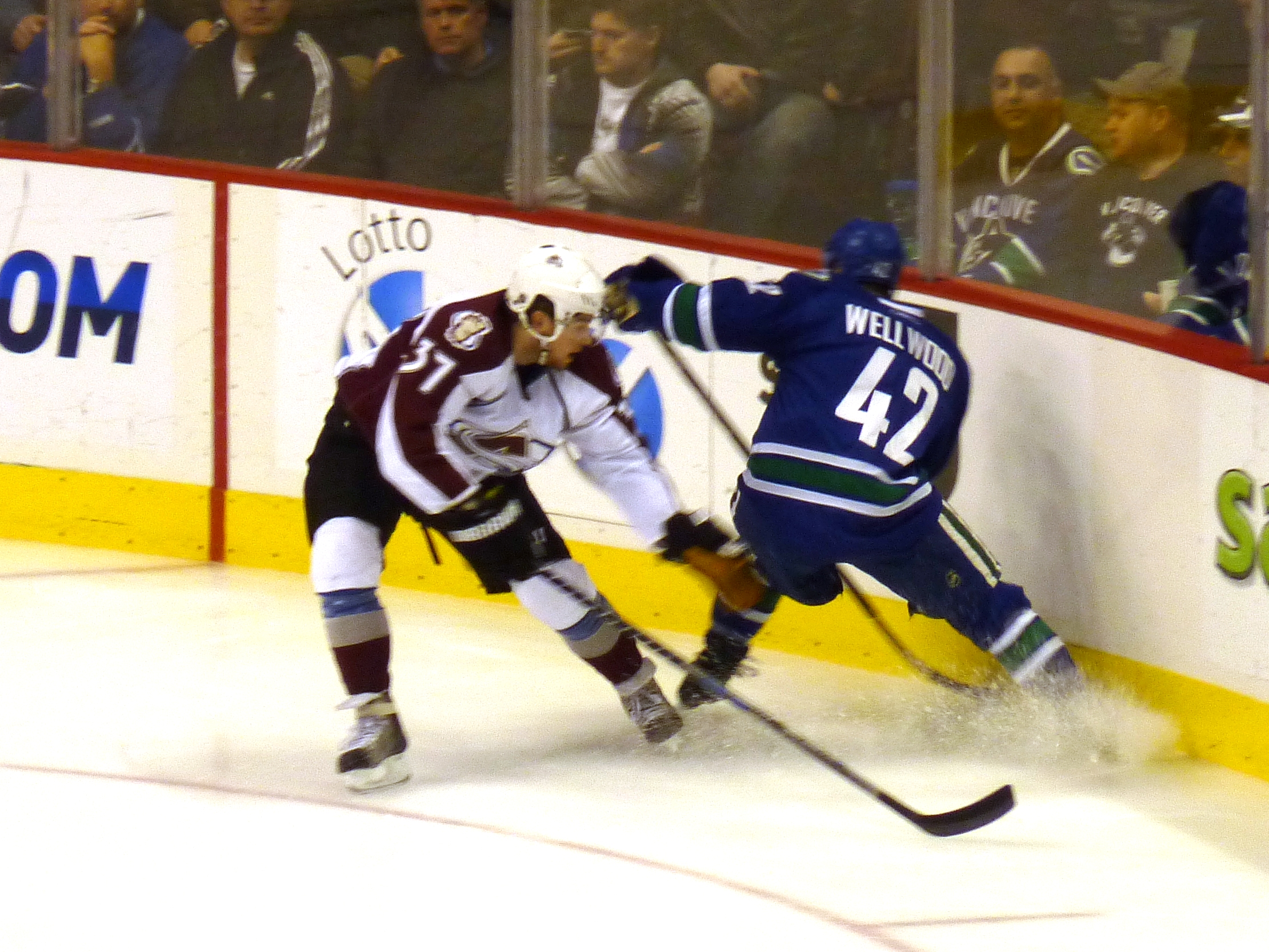
O'Reilly battles for the puck along boards with Kyle Wellwood, April 2010

In his second professional season in 2010–11, O'Reilly remained entrenched on the shut-down third line for the Avalanche. On November 19, 2010, he appeared in his 100th NHL game, a 5–1 victory over the New York Rangers. In scoring eight goals in his last 18 games, O'Reilly was able to match his rookie season contribution of 26 points and led the team for a second consecutive season in takeaways, with 72.

In the following year, 2011–12, having established himself as the leading defensive centre on the Avalanche, O'Reilly developed his two-way game and increased his offensive production playing alongside linemate Gabriel Landeskog. This was recognized as he was named as the NHL's Second Star of the Week for November 28 to December 4 after contributing with seven points in four games, and was leading all Avalanche forwards in ice time. On January 12, 2012, he appeared in his 200th career NHL game, scoring a goal in a 3–2 overtime defeat to the Nashville Predators. Despite the Avalanche missing the playoffs for a second-straight season, O'Reilly lead the NHL and set an Avalanche record with 101 takeaways. He also more than doubled his points output for his previous two seasons combined to finish as top scorer on the Avalanche with 18 goals and 55 points.

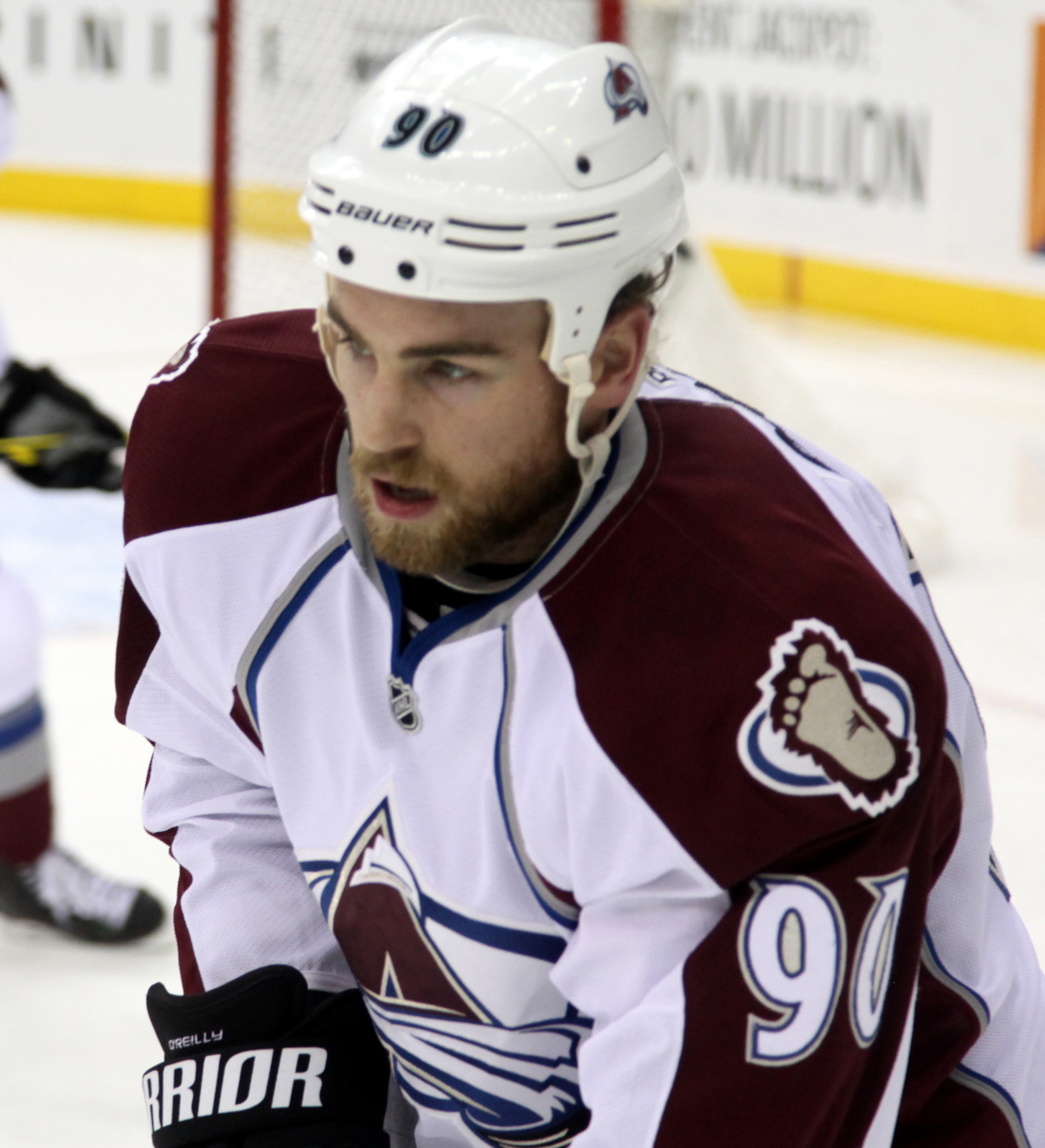
O'Reilly with the Avalanche in November 2014

As a restricted free agent in the off-season, O'Reilly's protracted contract negotiations with the Avalanche were halted by the expired Collective Bargaining Agreement between the NHL and the NHL Players' Association (NHLPA), which incurred the 2012–13 NHL lock-out. With the lock-out cancelling the start of the season, O'Reilly, in joining his brother Cal, signed a two-year contract with Russian Kontinental Hockey League (KHL) club Metallurg Magnitogorsk on December 7, 2012. Unlike the exodus of NHL players joining European leagues on short-term contracts, O'Reilly signed a two-year contract with the conditional opt-out clause in returning to the NHL if an agreement with the Avalanche was met. O'Reilly made his debut for Magnitogorsk in a 5–3 victory over Atlant Moscow Oblast on December 19.

Despite an end to NHL lock-out announced on January 12, 2013, O'Reilly was still unable to come to terms with the Avalanche and initially continued to play in Russia to miss the opening of the shortened 2012–13 season. On January 24, citing an ankle injury suffered through his 12 games with Metallurg, he mutually terminated his contract in Russia and returned for rehabilitation to North America. At an impasse with the Avalanche a month into the season, O'Reilly was training with the OHL's London Knights when he ended his holdout on February 28 after signing a two-year, $10 million offer sheet with the Calgary Flames. With a game coinciding between the two clubs on that day, the Avalanche announced during the contest that they opted to forgo compensation and secured O'Reilly to a contract by matching the Flames' offer sheet. Due to O'Reilly having signed a contract with a KHL franchise, had Colorado not matched Calgary's offer sheet, he would have had to pass through waivers before returning to the NHL.

In the 2013–14 season, under new Head Coach Patrick Roy, O'Reilly was moved to the wing to play alongside centre Matt Duchene and subsequently responded with a team-leading—and career-high—28 goals and 64 points in 80 games as the Avalanche returned to the playoffs. For the second time in his career, O'Reilly led the NHL in takeaways with 83 and, in recording just one penalty minor, was awarded the Lady Byng Memorial Trophy for gentlemanly conduct and sportsmanship by the League.

As an impending restricted free agent, and with past difficulties in contract negotiation, the Avalanche elected to take O'Reilly to a salary arbitration. On July 23, 2014, O'Reilly and the Avalanche agreed to settle prior to the arbitration hearing after negotiating a two-year, $12 million contract. During the 2014–15 season, O'Reilly scored 17 goals and 38 assists for 55 points, also leading the Avalanche in average ice time per game, as Colorado failed to make the 2015 playoffs.

==== Buffalo Sabres (2015–2018) ====
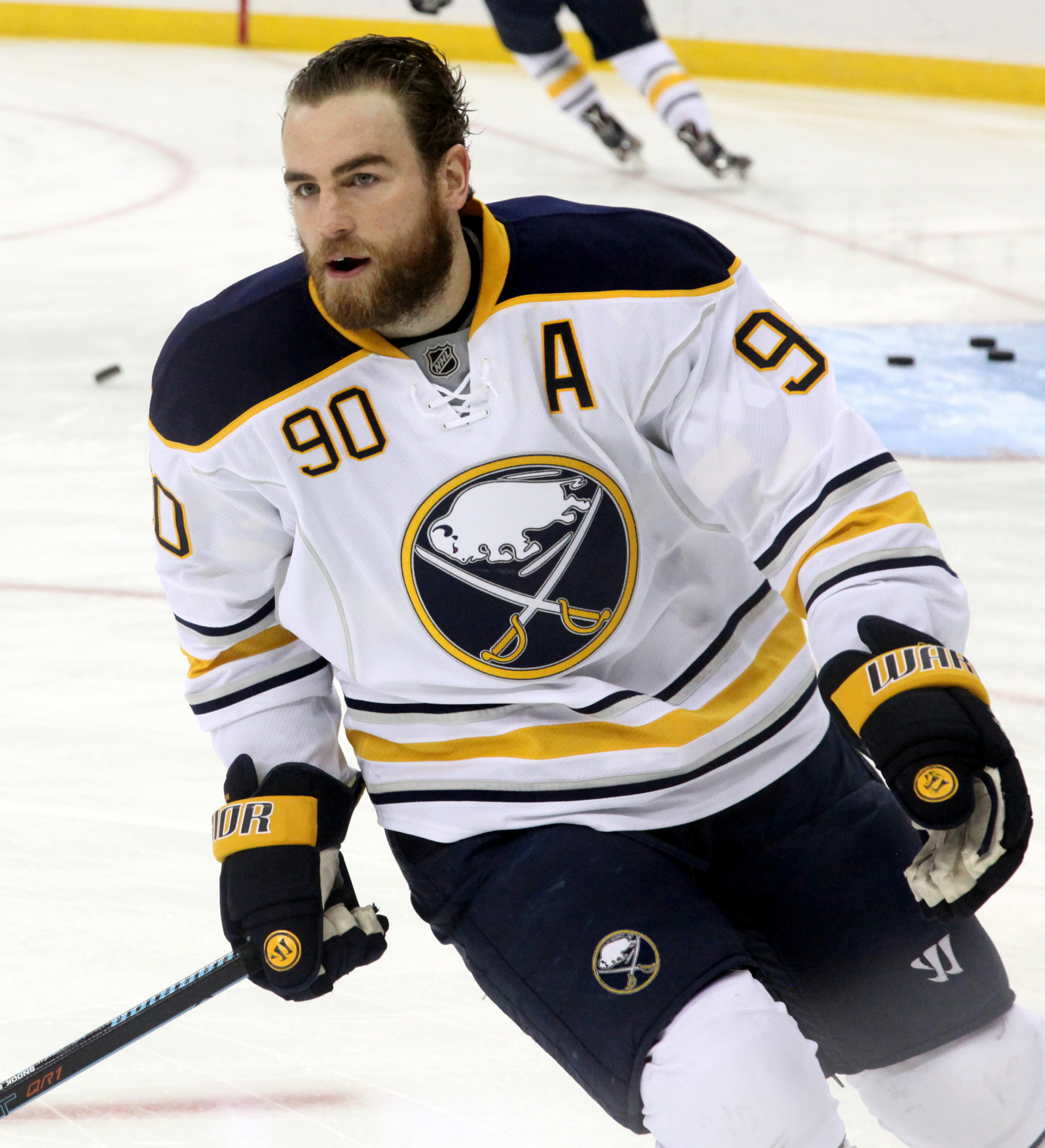
O'Reilly during his time with the Sabres in April 2016

On June 26, 2015, the Avalanche traded O'Reilly, alongside Jamie McGinn, to the Buffalo Sabres in exchange for Nikita Zadorov, forward Mikhail Grigorenko, prospect J. T. Compher and the 31st pick in the 2015 NHL entry draft. On July 2, O'Reilly then signed a seven-year contract extension with Buffalo worth $52.5 million, which came into effect during the 2016–17 season. O'Reilly's signing came on the same day as the Sabres organization signed his brother Cal O'Reilly to a two-year contract. O'Reilly was immediately named an alternate captain upon his arrival in Buffalo. The Sabres improved in O'Reilly's first season, after finishing last in league standings the previous two seasons. O'Reilly led the team offensively with 60 points.

On April 7, 2018, O'Reilly surpassed Rod Brind'Amour for most faceoff wins in a single season (1,269) in a 4–3 loss to the Florida Panthers. At the end of the 2017–18 season, O'Reilly was named a Lady Byng Memorial Trophy finalist as the league's most gentlemanly player. In spite of his personal success, the Sabres failed to qualify for the NHL playoffs during his tenure, resulting in O'Reilly admitting he began to lose his love of the game. His comments seemed to polarize fans in Buffalo, with many subsequently labeling O'Reilly a cancerous presence on the team, while others defended his remarks and agreed that the Sabres had become complacent with losing.

==== St. Louis Blues (2018–2023) ====
On July 1, 2018, O'Reilly was traded to the St. Louis Blues in exchange for Tage Thompson, Vladimír Sobotka, Patrik Berglund, a 2019 first-round pick and a 2021 second-round pick. Although O'Reilly experienced a career-high season with the Blues, the team fell to last place around the entire league by January 2, resulting in a coaching and goaltender change. As the Blues rebounded, O'Reilly enjoyed a career year in his first year in St. Louis, achieving career highs in assists and points and tying his career high in goals. He was invited to his second career NHL All-Star Game, where he registered seven points through two games and was a finalist for the All-Star Game MVP, ultimately losing the award to Sidney Crosby.

As the Blues qualified for the 2019 Stanley Cup playoffs, O'Reilly became the first player to score a goal in four consecutive Stanley Cup Final games since Wayne Gretzky in 1985. He was awarded the Conn Smythe Trophy after recording a franchise-record 23 playoff points as the Blues won their first Stanley Cup in franchise history, defeating the Boston Bruins 4–1 in game seven of the 2019 Stanley Cup Final. For his excellent two-way play during the season, O'Reilly won the Frank J. Selke Trophy as the league's best defensive forward on June 19, 2019, over Patrice Bergeron of the Boston Bruins and Mark Stone of the Vegas Golden Knights.

Although the 2019–20 regular season ended three weeks early than it was supposed to due to the COVID-19 pandemic, O'Reilly continued his success with the Blues and recorded 61 points in 71 games. Due to the loss of Vladimir Tarasenko to injury, O'Reilly was appointed an alternate captain for the team on October 31, 2019. On January 11, 2020, O'Reilly, as well as fellow Blues teammates Alex Pietrangelo, Jordan Binnington, and David Perron, were invited to the 2020 National Hockey League All-Star Game.

O'Reilly was named captain of the St. Louis Blues as replacement of Alex Pietrangelo on December 23, 2020.

==== Toronto Maple Leafs (2023) ====
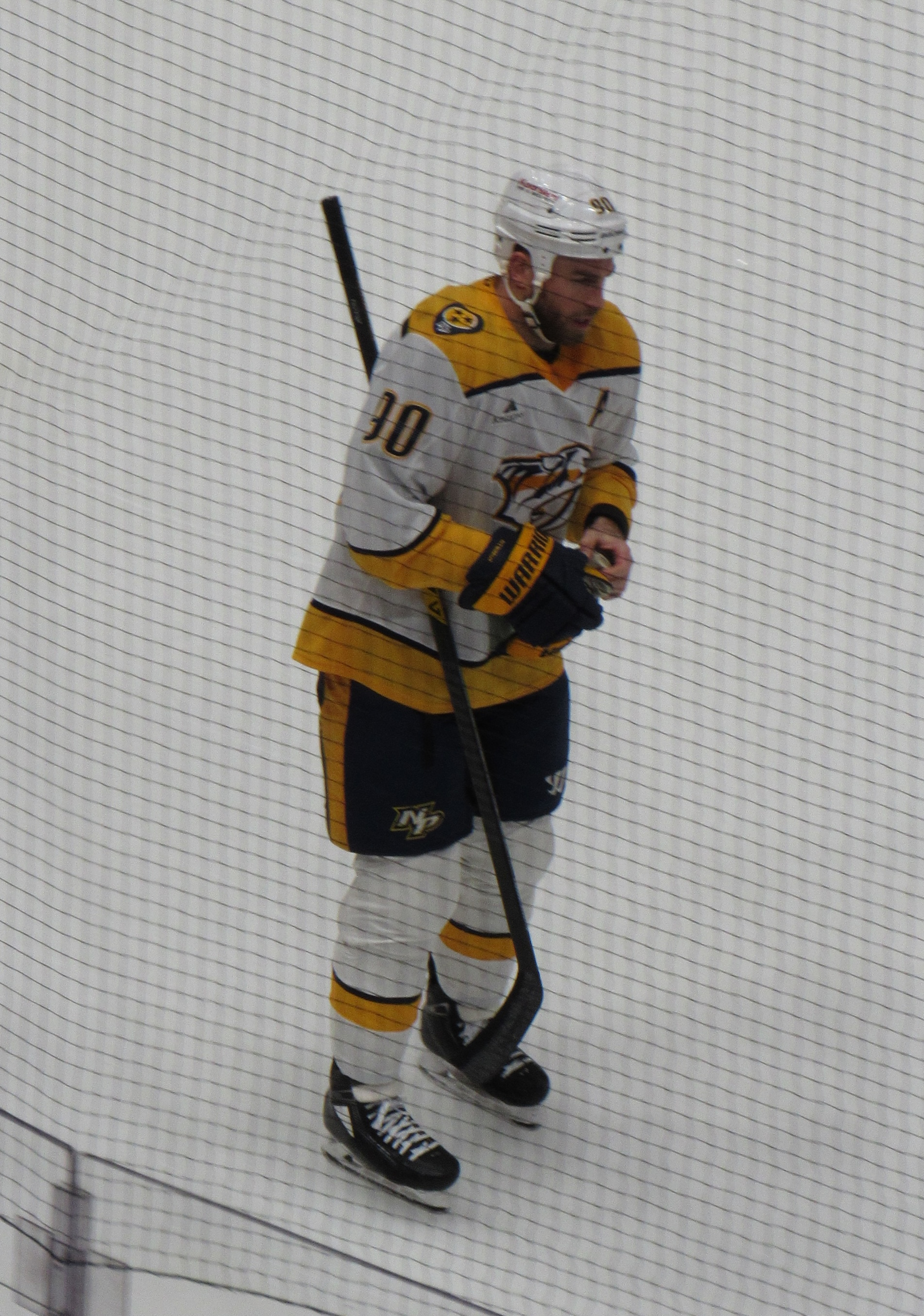
O'Reilly with the Predators in February 2026

With the Blues out of the playoffs picture during the 2022–23 season and O'Reilly an impending unrestricted free-agent, rumours began to circulate regarding a potential trade out of St. Louis for the team to recoup some assets. On February 17, 2023, the Blues traded O'Reilly and Noel Acciari to the Toronto Maple Leafs, in a three-team trade, also involving the Minnesota Wild. The trade sent the Maple Leafs' first-round pick and the Ottawa Senators' third-round pick in the 2023 NHL entry draft, the Maple Leafs' second-round pick in 2024, and Adam Gaudette and prospect Mikhail Abramov to the Blues. Toronto also received prospect Josh Pillar from the Wild, who got the Maple Leafs' fourth-round pick in 2025 in return, while St. Louis retained 50 percent and Minnesota retained 25 percent of O'Reilly's salary as part of the trade. He got his first Leafs point that game and his first Leafs hat trick on February 21 against his former team, the Buffalo Sabres.

After recording five points in his first three games with the Maple Leafs, O'Reilly went five games scoreless before suffering a broken finger in his eighth game with the team while blocking a shot; his subsequent surgery to repair the finger. The injury made him miss 4 weeks. In his game back he picked up 3 assists against the Montreal Canadiens.

During the 2023 Stanley Cup Playoffs, he took a leading role in the Leafs making it past the first round for the first time in 19 years, recording 3 goals and 6 assists.

==== Nashville Predators (2023–present) ====
In leaving the Maple Leafs, O’Reilly signed with the Nashville Predators on July 1, 2023, the opening day of NHL free agency. In joining his fifth NHL team, he was signed to a four-year, $18 million contract to begin in the 2023–24 season.

== International play ==
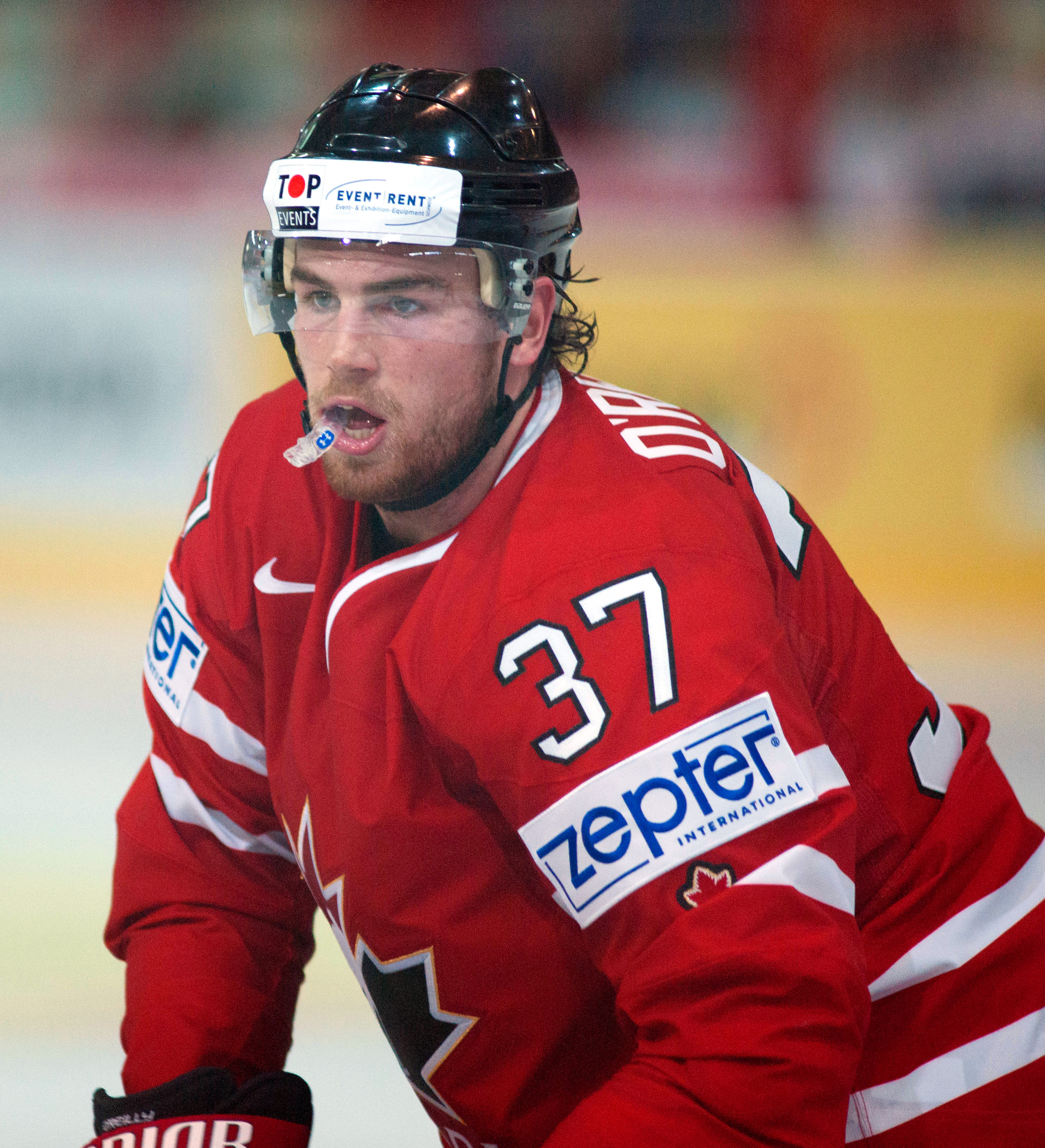
- O’Reilly with Team Canada during the 2012 IIHF World Championship

Medal record

Representing Canada

Ice hockey

World Championships
Gold medal – first place	2015 Czech Republic	
Gold medal – first place	2016 Russia	
Silver medal – second place	2017 Germany/France	

World Cup of Hockey
Gold medal – first place	2016 Toronto	

O'Reilly made his international debut at the 2008 World U-17 Hockey Challenge, scoring six points in six games as captain of gold medal-winning Team Ontario. As an underage 17-year-old, O'Reilly gained selection to Team Canada the 2008 Ivan Hlinka Memorial Tournament in Slovakia. He scored five points in four games and was named game MVP in the final against Russia as he helped Canada capture the gold medal for the fourth time in five years.

The following year, O'Reilly was selected as captain of Canada for the 2009 IIHF World U18 Championships. In six games, he contributed with five points before finishing in fourth place after losing 5–4 in the bronze medal game against Finland.

Unable to reach the playoffs with the Avalanche after the 2014–15 regular season, O'Reilly, for the third time in his professional career, was invited to participate in the 2015 IIHF World Championship in the Czech Republic. He helped contribute to a dominant Canadian team, scoring ten points in ten games as Canada won gold in the tournament final over Russia, their first victory in the World Championship since 2007.

O'Reilly repeated as World Champion with Canada in 2016. The following year, O'Reilly won silver at the 2017 IIHF World Championship. He was named an alternate captain for Team Canada at the 2018 IIHF World Championship.

In the preliminary round of the 2025 world championships O’Reilly passed Ryan Smyth for the most games played by a Canadian at the world championships, with 62 appearances.

== Personal life ==
O'Reilly is of Irish descent through his paternal grandparents. He is the younger brother of fellow professional hockey player Cal O'Reilly. The two were teammates with the Sabres. His sister, Tara O'Reilly, served as captain of the Carleton Ravens women's ice hockey program in 2009.

On July 13, 2015, Ontario Provincial Police charged O'Reilly with impaired driving following an incident in Lucan, Ontario when the vintage pickup truck he was driving struck a Tim Hortons. He was charged with driving a motor vehicle while ability impaired and care or control over 80 mgs. He was acquitted of the charges on July 11, 2016.

O'Reilly married longtime girlfriend Dayna Douros on June 30, 2018, just one day prior to being traded to the St. Louis Blues. The couple have four children together.

In 2023, O'Reilly and his family were featured in an episode of ESPN's E:60, which focused on his mother donating a kidney to the man who managed the local rink where her sons played hockey as kids.

In 2025, O'Reilly and former junior hockey teammate Kelly James began creating children's music, forming a band called Mac and Cheeze. They were inspired to do so after O'Reilly attended a Raffi Cavoukian concert. O'Reilly and James recorded the band's first album, Pizza Party, during the summer of 2025. The album was released on Friday, April 10th, 2026.

== Career statistics ==
=== Regular season and playoffs ===
Bold indicates led league

			Regular season					Playoffs
Season	Team	League	GP	G	A	Pts	PIM	GP	G	A	Pts	PIM
2005–06	Huron-Perth Lakers AAA	AH U16	51	31	40	71	60	—	—	—	—	—
2006–07	Toronto Jr. Canadiens AAA	GTHL U16	50	31	43	74	42	—	—	—	—	—
2006–07	Toronto Jr. Canadiens	OPJHL	1	1	0	1	0	4	2	0	2	0
2007–08	Erie Otters	OHL	61	19	33	52	14	—	—	—	—	—
2008–09	Erie Otters	OHL	68	16	50	66	26	5	0	5	5	2
2009–10	Colorado Avalanche	NHL	81	8	18	26	18	6	1	0	1	2
2010–11	Colorado Avalanche	NHL	74	13	13	26	16	—	—	—	—	—
2011–12	Colorado Avalanche	NHL	81	18	37	55	12	—	—	—	—	—
2012–13	Metallurg Magnitogorsk	KHL	12	5	5	10	2	—	—	—	—	—
2012–13	Colorado Avalanche	NHL	29	6	14	20	4	—	—	—	—	—
2013–14	Colorado Avalanche	NHL	80	28	36	64	2	7	2	4	6	0
2014–15	Colorado Avalanche	NHL	82	17	38	55	12	—	—	—	—	—
2015–16	Buffalo Sabres	NHL	71	21	39	60	8	—	—	—	—	—
2016–17	Buffalo Sabres	NHL	72	20	35	55	10	—	—	—	—	—
2017–18	Buffalo Sabres	NHL	81	24	37	61	2	—	—	—	—	—
2018–19	St. Louis Blues	NHL	82	28	49	77	12	26	8	15	**23**	4
2019–20	St. Louis Blues	NHL	**71**	12	49	61	10	9	4	7	11	0
2020–21	St. Louis Blues	NHL	56	24	30	54	18	4	0	3	3	2
2021–22	St. Louis Blues	NHL	78	21	37	58	12	12	7	5	12	2
2022–23	St. Louis Blues	NHL	40	12	7	19	10	—	—	—	—	—
2022–23	Toronto Maple Leafs	NHL	13	4	7	11	6	11	3	6	9	5
2023–24	Nashville Predators	NHL	82	26	43	69	18	6	1	1	2	0
2024–25	Nashville Predators	NHL	79	21	32	53	24	—	—	—	—	—
2025–26	Nashville Predators	NHL	81	25	49	74	22	—	—	—	—	—
NHL totals			1,233	328	570	898	216	81	26	41	67	15
KHL totals			12	5	5	10	2	—	—	—	—	—

=== International ===
Year	Team	Event	Result	GP	G	A	Pts	PIM
2008	Canada Ontario	U17	1st place, gold medalist(s)	6	0	6	6	0
2008	Canada	IH18	1st place, gold medalist(s)	4	3	2	5	0
2009	Canada	U18	4th	6	2	3	5	0
2012	Canada	WC	5th	7	2	2	4	4
2013	Canada	WC	5th	8	1	2	3	0
2015	Canada	WC	1st place, gold medalist(s)	10	2	9	11	0
2016	Canada	WC	1st place, gold medalist(s)	10	2	6	8	2
2016	Canada	WCH	1st place, gold medalist(s)	6	0	0	0	0
2017	Canada	WC	2nd place, silver medalist(s)	10	6	3	9	0
2018	Canada	WC	4th	10	4	0	4	2
2025	Canada	WC	5th	8	2	2	4	4
2026	Canada	WC	4th	10	5	4	9	0
Junior totals				16	5	11	16	0
Senior totals				79	24	28	52	12

== Awards and honours ==
Award	Year	Refs
CHL
Top Prospects Game	2009	
NHL
Lady Byng Memorial Trophy	2014	
NHL All-Star Game	2016, 2019, 2020	
Conn Smythe Trophy	2019	
Stanley Cup champion	2019	
Frank J. Selke Trophy	2019	

Awards and achievements
Preceded by Martin St. Louis	Winner of the Lady Byng Memorial Trophy; 2014	Succeeded by Jiří Hudler
Preceded by Alexander Ovechkin	Conn Smythe Trophy winner 2019	Succeeded by Victor Hedman
Preceded by Anže Kopitar	Frank J. Selke Trophy winner 2019	Succeeded by Sean Couturier
Sporting positions
Preceded by Alex Pietrangelo	St. Louis Blues captain 2020–2023	Succeeded by Brayden Schenn
