= Econyl =

Brand of recycled nylon yarn from waste material

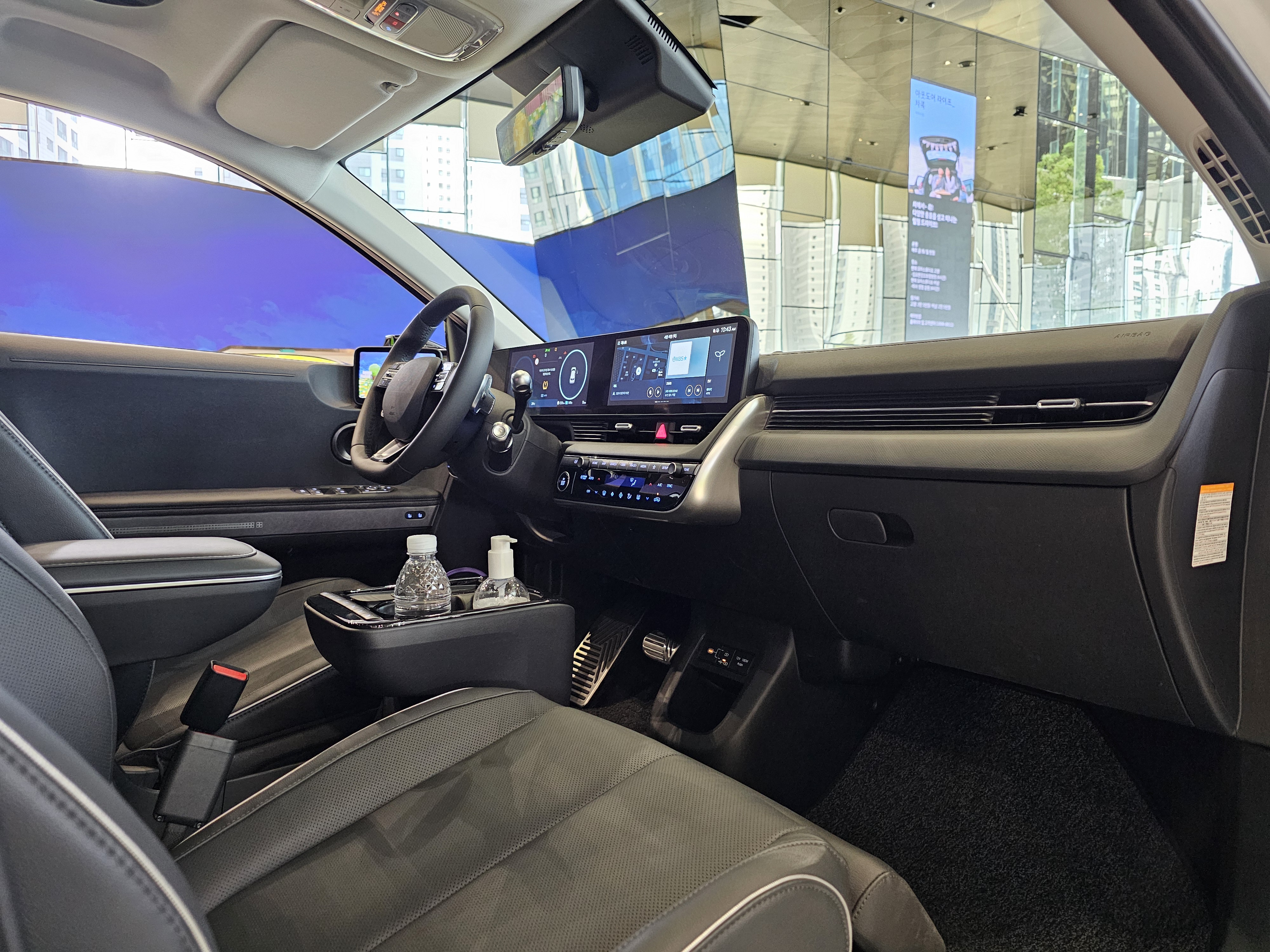
The Hyundai Ioniq 5's floor mats are made from Econyl.

Econyl is brand name for recycled polyamide fabric introduced in 2011 by Italian company Aquafil. It is made entirely from waste otherwise polluting the Earth, such as industrial discards, fabric scraps from clothing manufacturing companies, discarded carpets and fishing nets (mainly from the aquaculture industry).

== History ==
Aquafil
- Founded: 1965
- Headquarters: Trento, Italy
- Key people: Giulio Bonazzi (CEO)

Aquafil began nylon recycling in the 1990s, but did not begin exploration of a comprehensive nylon reuse cycle until 2007, which ultimately led to the development of Econyl Regeneration System and the associated closed-loop process in 2011. Commercial production of Econyl started the same year at Aquafil's plant in Slovenia.

In 2025 the company opened a production line in Slovenia which can separate nylon fibers from elastane, based on a method developed in collaboration with Georgia Tech researchers. The recovered nylon will be fed into the Econyl production process.

== Production ==
Recycling involves breaking down the nylon polymer into monomers, and then re-polymerizing the nylon them into brand-new nylon; the breakdown process is done with temperature, steam and catalysts, in a renewable energy-driven process. For every 10,000 tons of Econyl raw material produced, the company claims up to 70,000 barrels of crude oil are saved. Further, the material can be continuously recycled without loss of quality.

== Use ==
The material has been used by Stella McCartney (handbag linings, backpacks, outerware, etc.), Kelly Slater's label Outerknown, Adidas and Speedo swimwear, Levi's, Breitling (watch straps), Sam Badi and many other brands from the fashion and interior industries. It has also been used for trim, floor mats and as seat cover material by various automakers.
