= Parley for the Oceans =

Environmental organization

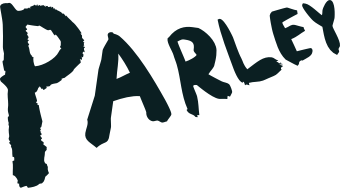
- Formation: 2012; 13 years ago
- Founder: Cyrill Gutsch
- Type: Nonprofit organization
- Purpose: Environmentalism
- Website: www.parley.tv

Parley for the Oceans is a nonprofit environmental organization that focuses on protection of the oceans. It was founded in 2012 by Cyrill Gutsch.

== Background ==
Before founding Parley for the Oceans, Cyrill Gutsch worked as a designer for companies including Lufthansa, BMW, and Adidas. A meeting with Paul Watson prompted him to start Parley in 2012.

== Partnerships ==
In 2015, Parley for the Oceans began a partnership with Adidas. The two organizations subsequently collaborated to produce products made from upcycled plastic. In December 2020, Vogue reported that they had manufactured "tens of millions of sneakers made from Parley Ocean Plastic". The partnership lasted until 2024.

Parley has additionally partnered with G-Star Raw, Porter magazine, Stella McCartney, and others.

In June 2020, Parley announced a $50 million partnership with the South Asia Co-operative Environment Programme and the World Bank to clean up plastic pollution in bodies of water in South Asia. The partnership additionally involved eight countries including Bangladesh, India, and the Maldives. Parley for the Oceans, along with JetBlue Technology Ventures and Toyota Ventures, is among the corporate investors that have invested $40 million in the Air Company, a carbon negative vodka distiller and perfume and hand sanitizer manufacturer that uses heterogeneous catalysis to convert captured carbon into ethanol.

== AIR strategy ==
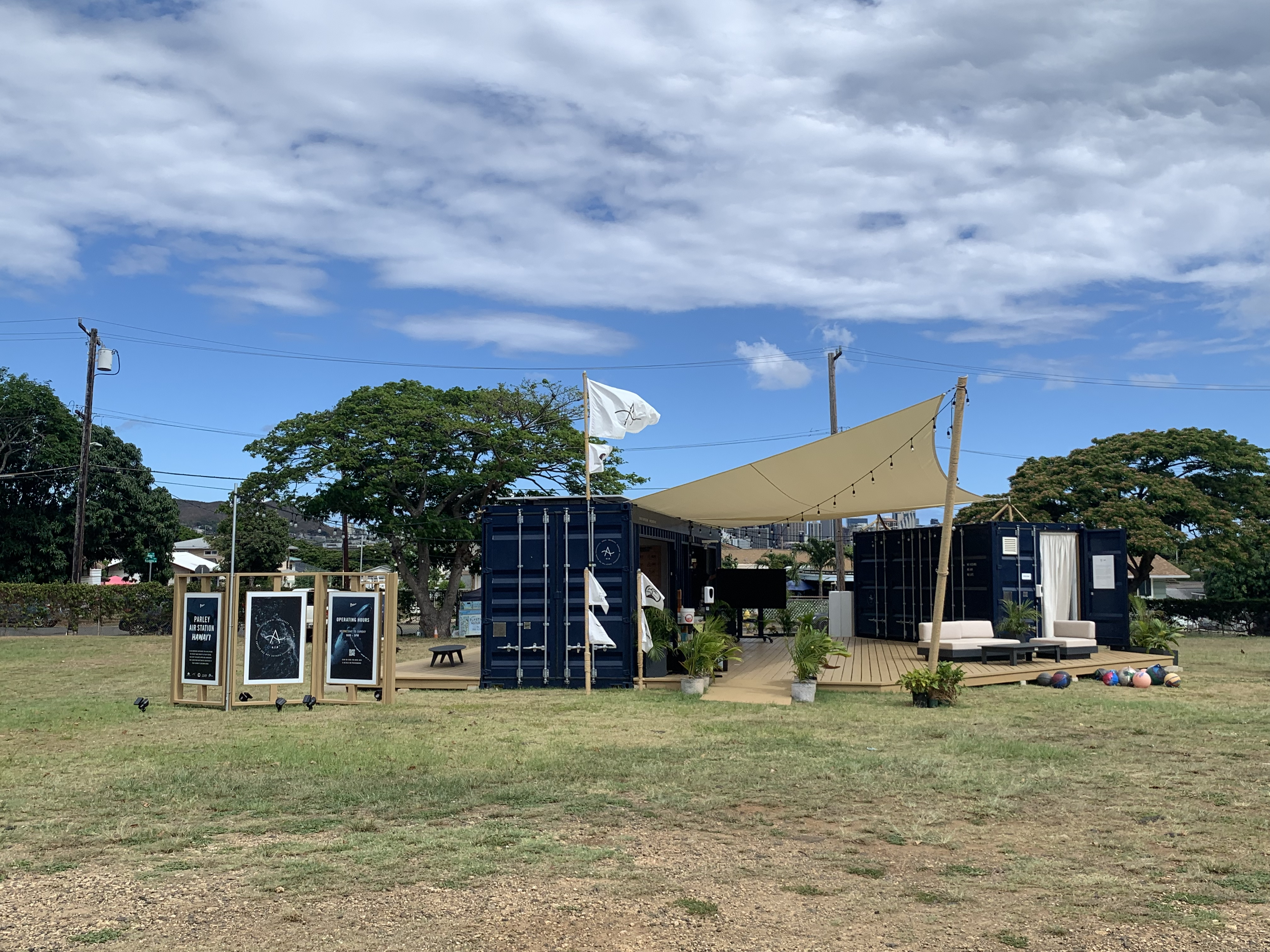
A Parley for the Oceans "AIR Station" at Bishop Museum in Honolulu, Hawaii

Parley for the Oceans' "AIR" strategy calls for Avoidance, Interception and Redesigning of the sources of plastic pollution.

The AIR pledge led Adidas to end the use of single-use plastic in its offices and Porter magazine to commit to plastic-free subscriptions by 2019.

== Reception ==
In 2018, Parley for the Oceans received the Special Recognition Award for Innovation at The Fashion Awards.
