= 2015 IIHF World Championship =

2015 edition of the IIHF World Championship

Tournament details
- Host country: Czech Republic
- Venues: 2 (in 2 host cities)
- Dates: 1–17 May
- Opened by: Miloš Zeman
- Teams: 16

Final positions
- Champions: Canada (25th title)
- Runners-up: Russia
- Third place: United States
- Fourth place: Czech Republic

Tournament statistics
- Games played: 64
- Goals scored: 354 (5.53 per game)
- Attendance: 741,700 (11,589 per game)
- Scoring leader: (Canada) Jason Spezza (14 points)

Awards
- MVP: (Czech Republic) Jaromír Jágr

Official website
- Website

The 2015 IIHF World Championship was the 79th event hosted by the International Ice Hockey Federation (IIHF), held from 1 to 17 May 2015 in Prague and Ostrava, Czech Republic. Until the 2024 Championship, it held the attendance record (741,690 total visitors).

Canada won their 25th title by defeating Russia 6–1 in the championship final game. Canada went undefeated at the tournament to win its first IIHF championship since 2007. With the win, Canadian captain Sidney Crosby became a member of the Triple Gold Club and the first to be the team captain for all three events. For winning all of its tournament games in regulation, the Canadian team earned the new Infront Team Jackpot award of one million Swiss francs. The Russians on the other hand were fined 80,000 CHF for most Russian players walking out from the medal ceremony before the Canadian anthem was played after the final game.

The United States won the bronze medal, defeating host Czech Republic 3–0 in the bronze medal final game. Czech player Jaromír Jágr (at 43 years of age) was the MVP of the tournament, and announced his retirement from international competition afterwards.

== Bids ==
On 21 May 2010, the Czech bid was successful and got 84 votes in the race for hosting the 2015 IIHF World Championship. The application beat out that from Kyiv, Ukraine (22 votes).

The two venues for the tournament were the O2 Arena (formerly Sazka Arena) in Prague and ČEZ Aréna in Ostrava, the same two venues that co-hosted the 2004 IIHF World Championship. Before Ostrava was announced, Plzeň, Brno, Pardubice, and even Bratislava, Slovakia, were considered.

== Venues ==
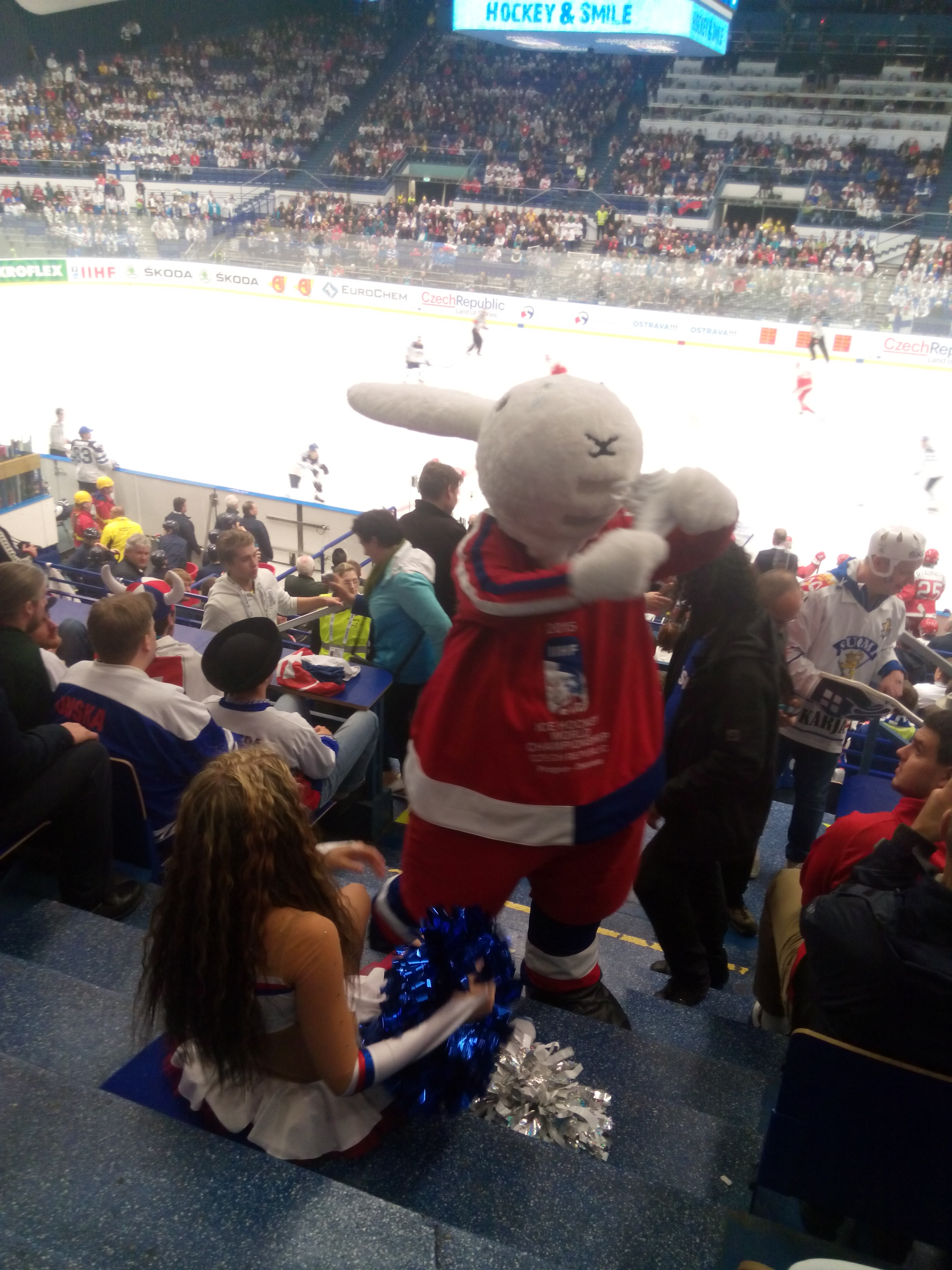
another rabbit of the tournament mascots from Bob and Bobek by Vladimir Jiranek.

Prague	2015 IIHF World Championship is located in Czech Republic	Ostrava
O2 Arena; Capacity: 17,383	2015 IIHF World Championship is located in Czech Republic	ČEZ Arena; Capacity: 8,812

Mascots: Bob and Bobek

== Participants ==
Countries participating in the 2015 IIHF Men's World Championship are marked in navy blue. The host country (Czech Republic) marked in red. Countries qualified through winning a promotion from Division I are marked in light-blue.

- Austria (Note: Qualified through winning a promotion at the 2014 IIHF World Championship Division I)
- Belarus (Note: Automatic qualifier after a top 14 placement at the 2014 IIHF World Championship)
- Canada
- Czech Republic (Note: Qualified as host)
- Denmark
- Finland
- France
- Germany
- Latvia
- Norway
- Russia
- Slovakia
- Slovenia
- Sweden
- Switzerland
- United States

== Format ==
Of the 16 teams in the tournament Czech Republic qualified as host while Austria and Slovenia qualified through the 2014 IIHF World Championship Division I, the rest qualified after a top 14 placement at the 2014 IIHF World Championship. The teams were divided into two groups of which the four best from each advanced to the quarterfinals. Here they met cross-over as indicated in the section below.

In the group round, points are awarded as follows:

- 3 points for a win in regulation time (W)
- 2 point for a team that drew in regulation time but won the following overtime (OTW) or game winning shots (GWS) (Note: In group play, overtime is played as 5 minutes of sudden death after a 3-minute intermission. If no goal is scored, the game goes to a shootout (Game Winning Shots). During a quarter-, semi- or bronze final, the sudden death period would be 10 minutes and during the final, it would be 20 minutes. Game Winning Shots procedure is as follows: Three different players from each team would take alternate shots. If the game is still tied after this, one player from each team would take alternating shots until one scored and the other missed. Only the decisive goal counted in the result table for group play.)
- 1 point for a team that drew and lost the above-mentioned competition (OTL)
- 0 points for a team that lost in regulation time (L)

If two or more teams finished with an equal number of points in the same group, their standings were determined by the following tiebreaking formula:

1. Points in games between the tied teams
2. Goal difference in games between the tied teams
3. Goals scored in games between the tied teams
4. Results against the closest best-ranking team outside the original group of tied teams
5. Results against the next highest ranking team outside the original group of tied teams
6. Tournament seedings

Final ranking: places 1–4 are determined by the medal games. Other places are determined by playoff positioning, group play positioning in the group, number of points, goal difference, goals scored, and tournament seeding. The two lowest ranking teams overall are relegated to Division I A.

== Seeding ==
The seeding in the preliminary round was based on the 2014 IIHF World Ranking, which ended at the conclusion of the 2014 IIHF World Championship. Slovakia and Switzerland swapped their slots between their groups to optimize the seeding for the Czech organizers.

Group A (Prague)

- Sweden (1)
- Canada (4)
- Czech Republic (5)
- Switzerland (7)
- Latvia (9)
- France (12)
- Germany (13)
- Austria (16)

Group B (Ostrava)

- Finland (2)
- Russia (3)
- United States (6)
- Slovakia (8)
- Norway (10)
- Belarus (11)
- Slovenia (14)
- Denmark (15)

== Rosters ==
Each team's roster consisted of at least 15 skaters (forwards and defencemen) and two goaltenders, and at most 22 skaters and three goaltenders. All 16 participating nations, through the confirmation of their respective national associations, had to submit a roster by the first IIHF directorate meeting.

== Officials ==
The IIHF selected 16 referees and 16 linesmen to work the tournament.

Referees	Linesmen
(Belarus) Maxim Sidorenko; (Czech Republic) Pavel Hodek; (Czech Republic) Vladimír Šindler; (Finland) Aleksi Rantala; (Finland) Jyri Rönn; (Germany) Daniel Piechaczek; (Russia) Vyacheslav Bulanov; (Russia) Roman Gofman; (Russia) Konstantin Olenin; (Slovakia) Jozef Kubuš; (Sweden) Tobias Bjork; (Sweden) Mikael Nord; (Sweden) Marcus Vinnerborg; (Switzerland) Daniel Stricker; (Switzerland) Tobias Wehrli; (United States) Timothy Mayer	(Canada) Bevan Mills; (Czech Republic) Vit Lederer; (Czech Republic) Miroslav Lhotský; (Czech Republic) Rudolf Tošenovjan; (Estonia) Anton Semjonov; (Finland) Masi Puolakka; (Finland) Sakari Suominen; (Germany) André Schrader; (Norway) Jon Killian; (Russia) Gleb Lazarev; (Slovakia) Peter Šefčík; (Sweden) Jimmy Dahmen; (Sweden) Henrik Pihlblad; (Switzerland) Nicolas Fluri; (United States) Paul Carnathan; (United States) Fraser McIntyre

== Preliminary round ==
The schedule was released on 21 August 2014.

All times are local (UTC+2).

=== Group A ===
Pos	Team	Pld	W	OTW	OTL	L	GF	GA	GD	Pts	Qualification or relegation
1	Canada	7	7	0	0	0	49	14	+35	21	Advance to the playoff round
2	Sweden	7	4	2	0	1	34	19	+15	16	Advance to the playoff round
3	Czech Republic (H)	7	4	1	1	1	27	18	+9	15	Advance to the playoff round
4	Switzerland	7	2	0	4	1	12	18	−6	10	Advance to the playoff round
5	Germany	7	2	0	1	4	11	24	−13	7	
6	France	7	1	1	0	5	13	20	−7	5 (Note: Head to head record; France 5p, Latvia 3p and Austria 1p. Austria relegated on head-to-head points.)	
7	Latvia	7	0	2	1	4	11	25	−14	5	
8	Austria	7	0	2	1	4	10	29	−19	5	Relegation to Division I A

Updated to match(es) played on 12 May 2015. Source: Standings
Rules for classification: 1) points; 2) head-to-head points; 3) head-to-head goal difference; 4) head-to-head number of goals scored; 5) result against closest best-ranked team outside tied teams; 6) result against second-best ranked team outside tied teams; 7) seeding before tournament.
(H) Host
Notes:

1 May 2015; 16:15	Canada	6–1 (3–0, 2–0, 1–1)	Latvia	O2 Arena, Prague; Attendance: 16,013

Game reference

Mike Smith
Goalies
Edgars Masaļskis
Ervīns Muštukovs
Referees:
(Czech Republic) Pavel Hodek
(Sweden) Marcus Vinnerborg
Linesmen:
(Norway) Jon Killian
(Czech Republic) Miroslav Lhotský

MacKinnon (Spezza, Savard) – 09:57	1–0
Spezza (Hamhuis, MacKinnon) – 13:04	2–0
Duchene (Hall, Barrie) – 14:11	3–0
Toffoli (Hamhuis, Burns) – 22:20	4–0
Spezza (MacKinnon, Crosby) – 23:04	5–0
	5–1	52:06 – Daugaviņš (Dārziņš, Džeriņš)
Crosby (PS) – 59:37	6–1

2 min
Penalties
6 min
42
Shots
17

1 May 2015; 20:15	Czech Republic	5–6 GWS (1–2, 0–1, 4–2) (OT 0–0) (SO: 0–1)	Sweden	O2 Arena, Prague; Attendance: 17,383

Game reference

Alexander Salák
Goalies
Jhonas Enroth
Referees:
(Germany) Daniel Piechaczek
(Finland) Aleksi Rantala
Linesmen:
(Russia) Gleb Lazarev
(Finland) Sakari Suominen

	0–1	03:23 – Lundqvist (Sjögren, Josefson)
	0–2	07:30 – Kronwall (Ekholm, Lander) (PP)
Jágr (Nakládal, Voráček) (PP) – 13:28	1–2
	1–3	34:34 – Rask (Lindholm, Hjalmarsson)
Hertl (Němec, Klepiš) (PP) – 42:52	2–3
	2–4	44:08 – Lindström (Möller)
Simon (Hejda) – 51:34	3–4
Červenka (Voráček, Čáslava) – 52:31	4–4
Zaťovič (Novotný, Simon) – 56:53	5–4
	5–5	59:07 – Sjögren (Lindström, Klingberg) (PP, EA)

Klepiš (miss)
Voráček
Sobotka (miss)
Shootout
Lindholm
(miss) Josefson
Ekman-Larsson
8 min
Penalties
10 min
28
Shots
25

2 May 2015; 12:15	Switzerland	3–4 GWS (1–0, 1–1, 1–2) (OT 0–0) (SO: 0–1)	Austria	O2 Arena, Prague; Attendance: 13,953

Game reference

Reto Berra
Goalies
Bernhard Starkbaum
Referees:
(Slovakia) Jozef Kubuš
(Germany) Daniel Piechaczek
Linesmen:
(Sweden) Henrik Pihlblad
(Slovakia) Peter Šefčík

Du Bois (Fiala, Almond) – 01:14	1–0
	1–1	22:12 – T. Raffl (Pallestrang)
Ambühl (Josi) (SH) – 25:54	2–1
	2–2	43:33 – Lebler (Herburger)
Bieber (Almond, Grossmann) – 51:01	3–2
	3–3	59:10 – M. Raffl (T. Raffl, Schumnig) (EA)

Suri (miss)
Brunner (miss)
Josi (miss)
Shootout
(miss) M. Raffl
Komarek
4 min
Penalties
8 min
37
Shots
25

2 May 2015; 16:15	France	1–2 (0–1, 0–0, 1–1)	Germany	O2 Arena, Prague; Attendance: 14,903

Game reference

Cristobal Huet
Goalies
Dennis Endras
Referees:
(Russia) Vyacheslav Bulanov
(Finland) Jyri Rönn
Linesmen:
(Switzerland) Nicolas Fluri
(Germany) André Schrader

	0–1	12:10 – Wolf (Rieder, Hager)
Fleury (S. Da Costa) – 50:44	1–1
	1–2	59:00 – Reimer (Hager) (PP)

10 min
Penalties
14 min
25
Shots
26

2 May 2015; 20:15	Latvia	2–4 (1–0, 1–3, 0–1)	Czech Republic	O2 Arena, Prague; Attendance: 17,383

Game reference

Edgars Masaļskis
Goalies
Alexander Salák
Ondřej Pavelec
Referees:
(Russia) Konstantin Olenin
(Switzerland) Daniel Stricker
Linesmen:
(Norway) Jon Killian
(Finland) Masi Puolakka

Daugaviņš (Dārziņš, Galviņš) (PP) – 13:13	1–0
	1–1	22:01 – Jordán (Červenka, Novotný)
Rēdlihs (Sprukts) (PP) – 23:18	2–1
	2–2	24:25 – Kovář (Nakládal, Erat) (PP)
	2–3	32:44 – Jágr (Erat, Kovář) (PP)
	2–4	45:29 – Voráček (Kovář, Nakládal) (PP)

35 min
Penalties
8 min
10
Shots
35

3 May 2015; 12:15	Austria	1–6 (0–3, 0–3, 1–0)	Sweden	O2 Arena, Prague; Attendance: 14,051

Game reference

Rene Swette
Bernhard Starkbaum
Goalies
Anders Nilsson
Referees:
(Russia) Roman Gofman
(Switzerland) Daniel Stricker
Linesmen:
(Czech Republic) Miroslav Lhotský
(Finland) Sakari Suominen

	0–1	13:38 – Forsberg
	0–2	18:37 – Klefbom (Sjögren, Josefson)
	0–3	19:18 – Lander (Eriksson, Forsberg)
	0–4	28:22 – Forsberg (Eriksson, Ekman-Larsson)
	0–5	29:13 – Lindholm
	0–6	31:14 – Forsberg (Lander, Ekman-Larsson)
Heinrich (Komarek, Latusa) – 53:17	1–6

12 min
Penalties
18 min
17
Shots
41

3 May 2015; 16:15	Canada	10–0 (4–0, 5–0, 1–0)	Germany	O2 Arena, Prague; Attendance: 15,046

Game reference

Martin Jones
Goalies
Dennis Endras
Danny aus den Birken
Referees:
(Slovakia) Jozef Kubuš
(Russia) Konstantin Olenin
Linesmen:
(United States) Fraser McIntyre
(Slovakia) Peter Šefčík

Crosby (O'Reilly) – 08:02	1–0
Hall (Eberle, Duchene) – 08:25	2–0
Eakin (O'Reilly) – 16:58	3–0
Eakin (Toffoli) – 19:49	4–0
Hall (Duchene, Eberle) – 22:10	5–0
Ekblad (Giroux, Wiercioch) – 24:29	6–0
Giroux (Ennis, Savard) – 27:34	7–0
Ennis (Giroux, Hamhuis) – 35:16	8–0
Hall (Duchene, Muzzin) – 39:37	9–0
Duchene (PS) – 42:03	10–0

6 min
Penalties
2 min
34
Shots
17

3 May 2015; 20:15	France	1–3 (0–1, 0–1, 1–1)	Switzerland	O2 Arena, Prague; Attendance: 8,780

Game reference

Cristobal Huet
Goalies
Leonardo Genoni
Referees:
(Czech Republic) Pavel Hodek
(Finland) Aleksi Rantala
Linesmen:
(Sweden) Henrik Pihlblad
(Finland) Masi Puolakka

	0–1	15:36 – Hollenstein (Brunner, Josi) (PP)
	0–2	21:24 – Josi (Fiala, Blum)
Raux – 48:31	1–2
	1–3	59:06 – Suri (Brunner) (ENG)

63 min
Penalties
12 min
20
Shots
35

4 May 2015; 16:15	Latvia	1–8 (0–1, 1–3, 0–4)	Sweden	O2 Arena, Prague; Attendance: 15,315

Game reference

Edgars Masaļskis
Goalies
Jhonas Enroth
Referees:
(Czech Republic) Pavel Hodek
(Finland) Aleksi Rantala
Linesmen:
(Czech Republic) Miroslav Lhotský
(Norway) Jon Killian

	0–1	17:37 – Eriksson (PP)
	0–2	30:05 – Eriksson (Ekholm, Kronwall) (PP)
Dārziņš (Daugaviņš, Galviņš) (PP) – 32:53	1–2
	1–3	33:03 – Forsberg (PS)
	1–4	39:46 – Eriksson (Ahnelöv)
	1–5	44:43 – Möller (Ekman-Larsson, Klingberg) (PP)
	1–6	49:32 – Josefson (Lundqvist)
	1–7	57:04 – Lundqvist (Hjalmarsson, Ekman-Larsson)
	1–8	59:51 – Rask (Ericsson, Lindholm)

10 min
Penalties
10 min
20
Shots
36

4 May 2015; 20:15	Canada	6–3 (2–1, 1–1, 3–1)	Czech Republic	O2 Arena, Prague; Attendance: 17,383

Game reference

Mike Smith
Goalies
Ondřej Pavelec
Referees:
(Russia) Vyacheslav Bulanov
(Finland) Jyri Rönn
Linesmen:
(Russia) Gleb Lazarev
(Finland) Sakari Suominen

Eberle (Ekblad, Duchene) – 04:18	1–0
Hall (Muzzin, Eberle) – 19:02	2–0
	2–1	19:22 – Erat (Kovář, Jágr)
	2–2	35:45 – Zaťovič (Simon, Kolář)
Couturier (Toffoli) – 37:40	3–2
Seguin (Hall, Barrie) (PP) – 42:02	4–2
Crosby (Giroux) (PP) – 50:07	5–2
	5–3	57:36 – Sobotka (Voráček)
Toffoli (O'Reilly, MacKinnon) (ENG) – 58:31	6–3

10 min
Penalties
14 min
38
Shots
25

5 May 2015; 16:15	Switzerland	1–0 (0–0, 0–0, 1–0)	Germany	O2 Arena, Prague; Attendance: 10,253

Game reference
Leonardo Genoni	Goalies	Timo Pielmeier	Referees: (Sweden) Mikael Nord (Russia) Vyacheslav Bulanov; Linesmen: (Finland) Masi Puolakka (Slovakia) Peter Šefčík
Hollenstein (Brunner, Romy) – 52:16 / 1–0			Referees: (Sweden) Mikael Nord (Russia) Vyacheslav Bulanov; Linesmen: (Finland) Masi Puolakka (Slovakia) Peter Šefčík
6 min	Penalties	12 min	Referees: (Sweden) Mikael Nord (Russia) Vyacheslav Bulanov; Linesmen: (Finland) Masi Puolakka (Slovakia) Peter Šefčík
18	Shots	18	Referees: (Sweden) Mikael Nord (Russia) Vyacheslav Bulanov; Linesmen: (Finland) Masi Puolakka (Slovakia) Peter Šefčík

5 May 2015; 20:15	Austria	0–2 (0–0, 0–0, 0–2)	France	O2 Arena, Prague; Attendance: 5,857

Game reference
Bernhard Starkbaum	Goalies	Cristobal Huet	Referees: (Switzerland) Tobias Wehrli (Czech Republic) Vladimír Šindler; Linesmen: (Sweden) Henrik Pihlblad (United States) Fraser McIntyre
0–1 / 46:13 – Fleury (S. Da Costa, Auvitu) (PP); 0–2 / 59:02 – Meunier (Y. Treille, Hecquefeuille) (ENG)			Referees: (Switzerland) Tobias Wehrli (Czech Republic) Vladimír Šindler; Linesmen: (Sweden) Henrik Pihlblad (United States) Fraser McIntyre
6 min	Penalties	2 min	Referees: (Switzerland) Tobias Wehrli (Czech Republic) Vladimír Šindler; Linesmen: (Sweden) Henrik Pihlblad (United States) Fraser McIntyre
34	Shots	17	Referees: (Switzerland) Tobias Wehrli (Czech Republic) Vladimír Šindler; Linesmen: (Sweden) Henrik Pihlblad (United States) Fraser McIntyre

6 May 2015; 16:15	Switzerland	1–2 OT (0–0, 0–1, 1–0) (OT 0–1)	Latvia	O2 Arena, Prague; Attendance: 10,856

Game reference

Reto Berra
Goalies
Edgars Masaļskis
Referees:
(Belarus) Maxim Sidorenko
(Czech Republic) Vladimír Šindler
Linesmen:
(Russia) Gleb Lazarev
(Norway) Jon Killian

	0–1	24:19 – Džeriņš (Dārziņš, Rēdlihs)
Bieber – 58:09	1–1
	1–2	62:19 – Daugaviņš (Dārziņš)

6 min
Penalties
10 min
36
Shots
21

6 May 2015; 20:15	Sweden	4–6 (3–0, 1–3, 0–3)	Canada	O2 Arena, Prague; Attendance: 16,695

Game reference

Anders Nilsson
Goalies
Mike Smith
Referees:
(Switzerland) Tobias Wehrli
(Finland) Jyri Rönn
Linesmen:
(Finland) Masi Puolakka
(Czech Republic) Miroslav Lhotský

Lander (Eriksson, Granberg) – 05:06	1–0
Rask (Klefbom, Lindholm) – 17:21	2–0
Forsberg (Eriksson, Klingberg) – 17:49	3–0
	3–1	26:43 – Ekblad (Burns, O'Reilly)
	3–2	31:27 – Hall (PS)
	3–3	34:23 – Couturier (Ekblad)
Möller (Sjögren, Ekman-Larsson) – 35:19	4–3
	4–4	50:24 – Wiercioch (Eberle, Crosby)
	4–5	53:31 – Ennis (Hall, Spezza) (PP)
	4–6	58:10 – Seguin (O'Reilly) (ENG)

4 min
Penalties
4 min
32
Shots
39

7 May 2015; 16:15	Czech Republic	5–1 (0–0, 2–1, 3–0)	France	O2 Arena, Prague; Attendance: 17,110

Game reference

Ondřej Pavelec
Goalies
Florian Hardy
Referees:
(Sweden) Mikael Nord
(Finland) Aleksi Rantala
Linesmen:
(Sweden) Henrik Pihlblad
(Finland) Sakari Suominen

Němec (Novotný) – 21:10	1–0
Sobotka (Krejčík) – 26:58	2–0
	2–1	28:41 – Hecquefeuille (Lampérier, Guttig)
Jágr (Kovář, Simon) – 44:25	3–1
Němec (Hertl, Voráček) – 48:28	4–1
Červenka (Němec, Krejčík) (PP) – 54:49	5–1

4 min
Penalties
10 min
46
Shots
20

7 May 2015; 20:15	Sweden	4–3 (2–1, 0–1, 2–1)	Germany	O2 Arena, Prague; Attendance: 16,137

Game reference

Jhonas Enroth
Goalies
Timo Pielmeier
Referees:
(Czech Republic) Pavel Hodek
(Belarus) Maxim Sidorenko
Linesmen:
(United States) Fraser McIntyre
(Slovakia) Peter Šefčík

Möller (Lindström, Sjögren) – 11:19	1–0
Lindström (Möller]) – 12:44	2–0
	2–1	15:48 – Kink (Rieder, Daschner) (PP)
	2–2	29:30 – Krämmer
Klingberg (Kronwall, Möller) – 42:56	3–2
Möller (Ekman-Larsson, Lindström) – 48:40	4–2
	4–3	54:39 – Plachta (Hospelt, Seidenberg)

6 min
Penalties
29 min
35
Shots
27

8 May 2015; 16:15	Czech Republic	4–0 (0–0, 3–0, 1–0)	Austria	O2 Arena, Prague; Attendance: 17,383

Game reference

Ondřej Pavelec
Goalies
Bernhard Starkbaum
Rene Swette
Referees:
(Russia) Vyacheslav Bulanov
(Finland) Jyri Rönn
Linesmen:
(Russia) Gleb Lazarev
(United States) Fraser McIntyre

Němec (Simon) – 31:09	1–0
Zaťovič (Hejda, Němec) – 38:04	2–0
Sobotka (Červenka, Krejčík) – 39:08	3–0
Voráček (Jordán, Hertl) – 40:07	4–0

4 min
Penalties
10 min
42
Shots
12

8 May 2015; 20:15	Germany	2–1 (0–1, 0–0, 2–0)	Latvia	O2 Arena, Prague; Attendance: 15,494

Game reference

Dennis Endras
Goalies
Edgars Masaļskis
Referees:
(Sweden) Mikael Nord
(Switzerland) Tobias Wehrli
Linesmen:
(Finland) Masi Puolakka
(Norway) Jon Killian

	0–1	11:05 – Dārziņš (Daugaviņš) (PP)
Wolf (Reimer, Krueger) (PP) – 46:46	1–1
Plachta – 57:35	2–1

10 min
Penalties
27 min
24
Shots
16

9 May 2015; 12:15	France	3–4 (1–2, 0–1, 2–1)	Canada	O2 Arena, Prague; Attendance: 15,300

Game reference

Ronan Quemener
Goalies
Martin Jones
Referees:
(Switzerland) Tobias Wehrli
(Czech Republic) Vladimír Šindler
Linesmen:
(Sweden) Henrik Pihlblad
(Slovakia) Peter Šefčík

	0–1	11:26 – Seguin (Spezza, Barrie) (PP)
	0–2	12:32 – Eberle (MacKinnon, Duchene)
Desrosiers (Meunier, Auvitu) – 16:31	1–2
	1–3	37:02 – Seguin (Spezza) (PP)
Y. Treille (Meunier) (PP) – 46:21	2–3
Fleury – 46:56	3–3
	3–4	49:18 – Eberle (Burns, Crosby)

12 min
Penalties
8 min
21
Shots
43

9 May 2015; 16:15	Austria	1–2 OT (1–0, 0–1, 0–0) (OT 0–1)	Latvia	O2 Arena, Prague; Attendance: 12,735

Game reference

Bernhard Starkbaum
Goalies
Edgars Masaļskis
Referees:
(United States) Timothy Mayer
(Sweden) Tobias Bjork
Linesmen:
(Russia) Gleb Lazarev
(Czech Republic) Miroslav Lhotský

Lebler (M. Raffl) – 16:07	1–0
	1–1	32:15 – Dārziņš (Daugaviņš)
	1–2	60:33 – Daugaviņš (Dārziņš, Galviņš)

2 min
Penalties
16 min
29
Shots
18

9 May 2015; 20:15	Sweden	2–1 OT (1–0, 0–0, 0–1) (OT 1–0)	Switzerland	O2 Arena, Prague; Attendance: 15,201

Game reference

Jhonas Enroth
Goalies
Leonardo Genoni
Referees:
(Belarus) Maxim Sidorenko
(Russia) Vyacheslav Bulanov
Linesmen:
(Finland) Sakari Suominen
(Norway) Jon Killian

Lindholm (Rask, Ericsson) – 07:17	1–0
	1–1	40:34 – Bodenmann (Blum, Ambühl)
Forsberg (Eriksson, Ekman-Larsson) (PP) – 63:49	2–1

10 min
Penalties
8 min
29
Shots
16

10 May 2015; 16:15	Germany	2–4 (1–1, 1–2, 0–1)	Czech Republic	O2 Arena, Prague; Attendance: 17,383

Game reference

Timo Pielmeier
Goalies
Ondřej Pavelec
Referees:
(Sweden) Mikael Nord
(Sweden) Tobias Bjork
Linesmen:
(Finland) Sakari Suominen
(United States) Fraser McIntyre

Pietta (Müller, Krueger) – 07:13	1–0
	1–1	13:39 – Vondrka
Wolf (Rieder) – 23:50	2–1
	2–2	25:58 – Koukal (Kolář, Simon)
	2–3	27:36 – Voráček (Jágr, Nakládal) (PP)
	2–4	55:58 – Jágr (Červenka)

6 min
Penalties
6 min
14
Shots
38

10 May 2015; 20:15	Switzerland	2–7 (1–2, 0–3, 1–2)	Canada	O2 Arena, Prague; Attendance: 17,003

Game reference

Reto Berra
Goalies
Mike Smith
Referees:
(United States) Timothy Mayer
(Finland) Jyri Rönn
Linesmen:
(Finland) Masi Puolakka
(Czech Republic) Miroslav Lhotský

	0–1	00:53 – Seguin (Muzzin, Giroux)
Trachsler (Schäppi, Streit) – 06:21	1–1
	1–2	19:42 – MacKinnon (Spezza, Wiercioch)
	1–3	27:59 – Ekblad (Couturier, Eakin)
	1–4	39:00 – Eberle (Crosby, Burns) (PP)
	1–5	39:59 – Eakin (Couturier, Ekblad)
Brunner – 42:17	2–5
	2–6	52:27 – Couturier (Toffoli, Hamhuis)
	2–7	57:08 – Giroux (Burns, O'Reilly) (PP)

16 min
Penalties
12 min
25
Shots
46

11 May 2015; 16:15	Germany	2–3 GWS (0–0, 0–1, 2–1) (OT 0–0) (SO: 0–1)	Austria	O2 Arena, Prague; Attendance: 11,302

Game reference

Dennis Endras
Goalies
Bernhard Starkbaum
Referees:
(Russia) Vyacheslav Bulanov
(Russia) Konstantin Olenin
Linesmen:
(Sweden) Henrik Pihlblad
(Slovakia) Peter Šefčík

	0–1	34:33 – T. Raffl (M. Raffl, Heinrich)
Wolf (Pietta, Müller) – 44:14	1–1
	1–2	54:22 – Rotter (Muhlstein)
Reimer (Kohl, Krämmer) – 57:59	2–2

Hospelt (miss)
Rieder
Reimer (miss)
Shootout
Heinrich
Komarek
(miss) Lebler
6 min
Penalties
6 min
17
Shots
34

11 May 2015; 20:15	Sweden	4–2 (1–0, 1–2, 2–0)	France	O2 Arena, Prague; Attendance: 12,490

Game reference

Jhonas Enroth
Goalies
Cristobal Huet
Florian Hardy
Referees:
(Belarus) Maxim Sidorenko
(Slovakia) Jozef Kubuš
Linesmen:
(Russia) Gleb Lazarev
(Norway) Jon Killian

Josefson (Klefbom, Ekman-Larsson) – 11:00	1–0
	1–1	20:34 – Fleury (Roussel, T. Da Costa)
	1–2	22:52 – Fleury (Roussel, Auvitu)
Forsberg (Lindholm) (PP) – 34:52	2–2
Forsberg (Ekman-Larsson) – 40:52	3–2
Ekman-Larsson (Eriksson, Klefbom) – 43:27	4–2

10 min
Penalties
16 min
41
Shots
17

12 May 2015; 12:15	Canada	10–1 (4–0, 2–0, 4–1)	Austria	O2 Arena, Prague; Attendance: 16,031

Game reference

Mike Smith
Goalies
Bernhard Starkbaum
Rene Swette
Referees:
(Belarus) Maxim Sidorenko
(Russia) Roman Gofman
Linesmen:
(Finland) Masi Puolakka
(Slovakia) Peter Šefčík

Barrie (O'Reilly, Giroux) – 06:04	1–0
Duchene (Spezza, Muzzin) – 09:09	2–0
Hall (Burns) – 11:17	3–0
Ekblad (Eberle) – 14:10	4–0
Spezza (Duchene, Wiercioch) – 21:58	5–0
Eberle (Burns) – 35:52	6–0
	6–1	42:44 – Heinrich (Rotter)
MacKinnon (Muzzin]) – 42:53	7–1
Spezza – 43:05	8–1
Schenn (Duchene) – 46:09	9–1
Duchene (MacKinnon, Spezza) – 54:43	10–1

0 min
Penalties
4 min
46
Shots
15

12 May 2015; 16:15	Latvia	2–3 GWS (1–0, 1–0, 0–2) (OT 0–0) (SO: 0–1)	France	O2 Arena, Prague; Attendance: 15,167

Game reference

Edgars Masaļskis
Goalies
Cristobal Huet
Referees:
(United States) Timothy Mayer
(Finland) Jyri Rönn
Linesmen:
(Finland) Sakari Suominen
(Czech Republic) Miroslav Lhotský

Daugaviņš (Dārziņš, Galviņš) – 11:25	1–0
Galviņš (Dārziņš, Daugaviņš) (PP) – 22:48	2–0
	2–1	48:21 – S. Da Costa (Fleury)
	2–2	55:20 – S. Treille (Hecquefeuille, Huet)

Dārziņš
Daugaviņš (miss)
Shootout
Fleury
Desrosiers
S. Da Costa
6 min
Penalties
6 min
13
Shots
35

12 May 2015; 20:15	Czech Republic	2–1 GWS (0–1, 0–0, 1–0) (OT 0–0) (SO: 1–0)	Switzerland	O2 Arena, Prague; Attendance: 17,383

Game reference
Ondřej Pavelec	Goalies	Reto Berra	Referees: (Slovakia) Jozef Kubuš (Russia) Konstantin Olenin; Linesmen: (Sweden) Henrik Pihlblad (United States) Fraser McIntyre
/ 0–1 / 16:56 – Fiala (Brunner, Streit) (PP2); Zaťovič (Kovář, Kolář) – 50:44 / 1–1			Referees: (Slovakia) Jozef Kubuš (Russia) Konstantin Olenin; Linesmen: (Sweden) Henrik Pihlblad (United States) Fraser McIntyre
Voráček; Kovář (miss); Vondrka	Shootout	Fiala; (miss) Ambühl; (miss) Loeffel	Referees: (Slovakia) Jozef Kubuš (Russia) Konstantin Olenin; Linesmen: (Sweden) Henrik Pihlblad (United States) Fraser McIntyre
12 min	Penalties	14 min	Referees: (Slovakia) Jozef Kubuš (Russia) Konstantin Olenin; Linesmen: (Sweden) Henrik Pihlblad (United States) Fraser McIntyre
29	Shots	27	Referees: (Slovakia) Jozef Kubuš (Russia) Konstantin Olenin; Linesmen: (Sweden) Henrik Pihlblad (United States) Fraser McIntyre

=== Group B ===
Pos	Team	Pld	W	OTW	OTL	L	GF	GA	GD	Pts	Qualification or relegation
1	United States	7	5	1	0	1	22	14	+8	17	Advance to the playoff round
2	Finland	7	4	2	0	1	22	9	+13	16	Advance to the playoff round
3	Russia	7	4	1	1	1	30	16	+14	15	Advance to the playoff round
4	Belarus	7	4	0	2	1	20	19	+1	14	Advance to the playoff round
5	Slovakia	7	1	2	2	2	17	19	−2	9	
6	Norway	7	2	0	0	5	12	23	−11	6	
7	Denmark	7	1	0	1	5	10	20	−10	4	
8	Slovenia	7	1	0	0	6	9	22	−13	3	Relegation to Division I A

Updated to match(es) played on 12 May 2015. Source: Standings
Rules for classification: 1) points; 2) head-to-head points; 3) head-to-head goal difference; 4) head-to-head number of goals scored; 5) result against closest best-ranked team outside tied teams; 6) result against second-best ranked team outside tied teams; 7) seeding before tournament.

1 May 2015; 16:15	United States	5–1 (1–0, 2–1, 2–0)	Finland	ČEZ Aréna, Ostrava; Attendance: 8,812

Game reference

Connor Hellebuyck
Goalies
Pekka Rinne
Referees:
(Sweden) Tobias Bjork
(Russia) Vyacheslav Bulanov
Linesmen:
(Czech Republic) Vit Lederer
(Czech Republic) Rudolf Tošenovjan

Moses (Krug, Nelson) – 19:37	1–0
	1–1	25:40 – Jokipakka (Pesonen, Kemppainen)
Hendricks (Sexton) – 31:57	2–1
Sexton (Krug, Hendricks) – 34:74	3–1
Bonino (Moses, Nelson) – 46:19	4–1
Hendricks (Larkin) (ENG) – 57:22	5–1

8 min
Penalties
4 min
27
Shots
30

1 May 2015; 20:15	Russia	6–2 (4–0, 2–2, 0–0)	Norway	ČEZ Aréna, Ostrava; Attendance: 6,314

Game reference

Sergei Bobrovsky
Goalies
Lars Volden
Referees:
(United States) Timothy Mayer
(Finland) Jyri Rönn
Linesmen:
(Sweden) Jimmy Dahmen
(Canada) Bevan Mills

Shipachyov (Kovalchuk, Dadonov) (PP) – 02:51	1–0
Anisimov (Kovalchuk) – 03:10	2–0
Zaripov (Mozyakin, Tikhonov) – 15:14	3–0
Tikhonov (Medvedev, Zaripov) – 16:53	4–0
	4–1	20:25 – Thoresen (M. Olimb, Holøs)
	4–2	26:50 – Thoresen (M. Olimb, Ask)
Chudinov (Mozyakin, Zaripov) – 29:08	5–2
Panarin (Shipachyov, Biryukov) – 34:10	6–2

8 min
Penalties
10 min
36
Shots
19

2 May 2015; 12:15	Slovakia	4–3 GWS (0–0, 0–1, 3–2) (OT 0–0) (SO: 1–0)	Denmark	ČEZ Aréna, Ostrava; Attendance: 8,812

Game reference

Ján Laco
Goalies
Patrick Galbraith
Referees:
(Russia) Vyacheslav Bulanov
(Finland) Jyri Rönn
Linesmen:
(Switzerland) Nicolas Fluri
(Germany) André Schrader

	0–1	25:05 – Bjorkstrand (J. Jensen, J. B. Jensen) (PP)
Sersen (Hudáček, Pánik) (PP) – 48:08	1–1
Viedenský (Dravecký, Lušňák) – 49:26	2–1
	2–2	49:57 – Hardt (Madsen)
Graňák (Dravecký, Laco) (PP) – 51:11	3–2
	3–3	57:46 – Nielsen

Gáborík (miss)
Viedenský
Dravecký (miss)
Gáborík (miss)
Viedenský (miss)
Daňo
Shootout
(miss) Hardt
Madsen
(miss) Spelling
(miss) J. Jensen
(miss) Hardt
(miss) Green
6 min
Penalties
10 min
43
Shots
19

2 May 2015; 16:15	Belarus	4–2 (2–1, 1–0, 1–1)	Slovenia	ČEZ Aréna, Ostrava; Attendance: 5,995

Game reference

Kevin Lalande
Goalies
Robert Kristan
Referees:
(Sweden) Mikael Nord
(Switzerland) Tobias Wehrli
Linesmen:
(Estonia) Anton Semjonov
(Czech Republic) Vit Lederer

Stas (Korobov, Gavrus) – 10:08	1–0
	1–1	10:42 – Jeglič (Tičar)
A. Kostitsyn (Stas, Gavrus) – 12:16	2–1
Kalyuzhny (A. Kostitsyn, S. Kostitsyn) – 23:51	3–1
	3–2	51:47 – Pance (Razingar, Kopitar)
Kitarov (ENG) – 59:41	4–2

4 min
Penalties
4 min
26
Shots
23

2 May 2015; 20:15	Norway	1–2 (1–1, 0–1, 0–0)	United States	ČEZ Aréna, Ostrava; Attendance: 6,301

Game reference

Lars Haugen
Goalies
Connor Hellebuyck
Referees:
(Belarus) Maxim Sidorenko
(Czech Republic) Vladimír Šindler
Linesmen:
(Canada) Bevan Mills
(Czech Republic) Rudolf Tošenovjan

Ask (Tollefsen, M. Olimb) – 06:39	1–0
	1–1	12:14 – Lewis (Vesey)
	1–2	25:58 – Nelson (Krug, Lewis)

12 min
Penalties
20 min
23
Shots
35

3 May 2015; 12:15	Russia	5–3 (3–0, 1–2, 1–1)	Slovenia	ČEZ Aréna, Ostrava; Attendance: 7,557

Game reference

Konstantin Barulin
Goalies
Luka Gračnar
Referees:
(Sweden) Tobias Bjork
(Belarus) Maxim Sidorenko
Linesmen:
(Switzerland) Nicolas Fluri
(Czech Republic) Vit Lederer

Kovalchuk (Dadonov, Barulin) – 04:03	1–0
Kulemin (Antipin) – 04:39	2–0
Dadonov (Panarin, Shipachyov) (PP) – 18:56	3–0
	3–1	23:14 – Kopitar (Pretnar, Kranjc)
Shipachyov (Panarin, Dadonov) – 29:27	4–1
	4–2	34:30 – Pance
Dadonov (Shipachyov, Panarin) – 45:45	5–2
	5–3	54:46 – Sabolič (Tičar, Jeglič)

4 min
Penalties
4 min
35
Shots
25

3 May 2015; 16:15	Belarus	1–2 OT (0–0, 0–0, 1–1) (OT 0–1)	Slovakia	ČEZ Aréna, Ostrava; Attendance: 8,812

Game reference

Kevin Lalande
Goalies
Ján Laco
Referees:
(United States) Timothy Mayer
(Czech Republic) Vladimír Šindler
Linesmen:
(United States) Paul Carnathan
(Sweden) Jimmy Dahmen

S. Kostitsyn (Kalyuzhny, A. Kostitsyn) – 51:27	1–0
	1–1	52:31 – Meszároš (Hudáček, Dravecký)
	1–2	61:55 – Meszároš (Jurčo, Tatar)

8 min
Penalties
10 min
18
Shots
34

3 May 2015; 20:15	Denmark	0–3 (0–0, 0–3, 0–0)	Finland	ČEZ Aréna, Ostrava; Attendance: 8,353

Game reference

Sebastian Dahm
Goalies
Pekka Rinne
Referees:
(Sweden) Mikael Nord
(Switzerland) Tobias Wehrli
Linesmen:
(Germany) André Schrader
(Estonia) Anton Semjonov

0–1	27:47 – Jokinen (Salmela, Donskoi)
0–2	28:58 – Pesonen (Louhivaara, Kemppainen)
0–3	35:56 – Barkov (Lindell, Jokinen)

8 min
Penalties
2 min
16
Shots
41

4 May 2015; 16:15	Russia	2–4 (0–1, 1–1, 1–2)	United States	ČEZ Aréna, Ostrava; Attendance: 8,812

Game reference

Sergei Bobrovsky
Goalies
Jack Campbell
Referees:
(Sweden) Marcus Vinnerborg
(Germany) Daniel Piechaczek
Linesmen:
(Czech Republic) Rudolf Tošenovjan
(Canada) Bevan Mills

	0–1	06:22 – Lewis (Jones, Eichel)
Belov (Panarin, Dadonov) – 23:40	1–1
	1–2	26:22 – Krug (Jones, Faulk) (PP2)
	1–3	51:52 – Arcobello (Vesey)
Plotnikov (Kulikov, Anisimov) – 56:19	2–3
	2–4	59:51 – Nelson (Lee) (ENG)

6 min
Penalties
6 min
17
Shots
20

4 May 2015; 20:15	Norway	0–5 (0–1, 0–2, 0–2)	Finland	ČEZ Aréna, Ostrava; Attendance: 6,634

Game reference

Lars Volden
Goalies
Pekka Rinne
Referees:
(United States) Timothy Mayer
(Sweden) Tobias Bjork
Linesmen:
(Sweden) Jimmy Dahmen
(Czech Republic) Vit Lederer

0–1	05:05 – Lindell (Jokinen, Barkov) (PP)
0–2	28:39 – Kemppainen (Lindell, Aaltonen) (PP2)
0–3	30:21 – Kemppainen (Lindell, Aaltonen) (PP2)
0–4	51:15 – Jokipakka (Komarov, Kemppainen)
0–5	52:11 – Jokinen (Salmela, Barkov)

10 min
Penalties
12 min
20
Shots
30

5 May 2015; 16:15	Denmark	1–5 (1–0, 0–3, 0–2)	Belarus	ČEZ Aréna, Ostrava; Attendance: 4,796

Game reference

Patrick Galbraith
Goalies
Kevin Lalande
Referees:
(Switzerland) Daniel Stricker
(Slovakia) Jozef Kubuš
Linesmen:
(Switzerland) Nicolas Fluri
(Germany) André Schrader

Jakobsen (Madsen, Hardt) – 13:38	1–0
	1–1	20:44 – Gavrus (A. Kostitsyn, Kalyuzhny)
	1–2	27:27 – Kovyrshin (Kulakov, Stepanov)
	1–3	29:35 – Shinkevich (Kalyuzhny, A. Kostitsyn)
	1–4	45:36 – Kovyrshin (Kulakov, Shinkevich)
	1–5	54:44 – Usenko (Kitarov, Demkov)

18 min
Penalties
8 min
26
Shots
35

5 May 2015; 20:15	Slovakia	3–1 (0–1, 0–0, 3–0)	Slovenia	ČEZ Aréna, Ostrava; Attendance: 8,812

Game reference

Ján Laco
Goalies
Robert Kristan
Referees:
(Russia) Konstantin Olenin
(Russia) Roman Gofman
Linesmen:
(Estonia) Anton Semjonov
(United States) Paul Carnathan

	0–1	06:20 – Urbas (Kranjc, Kovačevič) (PP)
Meszároš (Surový) (PP) – 47:57	1–1
Gáborík (Hudáček, Surový) – 54:16	2–1
Gáborík (ENG) – 59:59	3–1

6 min
Penalties
12 min
33
Shots
23

6 May 2015; 16:15	Russia	5–2 (2–0, 1–1, 2–1)	Denmark	ČEZ Aréna, Ostrava; Attendance: 7,682

Game reference

Sergei Bobrovsky
Goalies
Sebastian Dahm
Referees:
(United States) Timothy Mayer
(Sweden) Tobias Bjork
Linesmen:
(Canada) Bevan Mills
(Estonia) Anton Semjonov

Panarin (Dadonov, Shipachyov) (PP) – 10:53	1–0
Mozyakin (Malkin) – 13:17	2–0
	2–1	29:35 – Green (Spelling, O. Lauridsen)
Dadonov (Medvedev, Chudinov) (PP) – 38:45	3–1
	3–2	49:36 – Spelling (PP)
Mozyakin (Kulemin, Malkin) – 57:03	4–2
Tarasenko (Antipin, Plotnikov) – 57:51	5–2

12 min
Penalties
10 min
33
Shots
20

6 May 2015; 20:15	Slovakia	2–3 (1–0, 1–2, 0–1)	Norway	ČEZ Aréna, Ostrava; Attendance: 8,812

Game reference

Ján Laco
Goalies
Lars Haugen
Referees:
(Switzerland) Daniel Stricker
(Sweden) Marcus Vinnerborg
Linesmen:
(Sweden) Jimmy Dahmen
(Czech Republic) Rudolf Tošenovjan

Surový (Gáborík, Hudáček) (PP) – 18:03	1–0
Ďaloga (Mikuš, Tatar) – 21:29	2–0
	2–1	25:40 – Nørstebø (Holøs, M. Olimb) (PP)
	2–2	35:30 – Rosseli Olsen (Ask, Martinsen)
	2–3	41:56 – Nørstebø (Thoresen, Holøs) (PP)

45 min
Penalties
10 min
24
Shots
23

7 May 2015; 16:15	United States	2–5 (0–0, 1–3, 1–2)	Belarus	ČEZ Aréna, Ostrava; Attendance: 6,648

Game reference

Jack Campbell
Goalies
Kevin Lalande
Referees:
(Russia) Konstantin Olenin
(Russia) Roman Gofman
Linesmen:
(Czech Republic) Vit Lederer
(Germany) André Schrader

	0–1	31:11 – Gavrus (Lisovets, Shinkevich)
	0–2	33:01 – Volkov (S. Kostitsyn)
	0–3	36:06 – Kitarov (S. Kostitsyn)
Nelson (Eichel) – 37:21	1–3
	1–4	41:15 – Kalyuzhny (A. Kostitsyn, Usenko) (PP2)
Krug (Eichel, Lewis) (PP) – 45:35	2–4
	2–5	48:23 – Kalyuzhny (A. Kostitsyn, Lisovets)

8 min
Penalties
10 min
30
Shots
23

7 May 2015; 20:15	Finland	4–0 (2–0, 2–0, 0–0)	Slovenia	ČEZ Aréna, Ostrava; Attendance: 6,450

Game reference

Pekka Rinne
Goalies
Gašper Krošelj
Referees:
(Slovakia) Jozef Kubuš
(Germany) Daniel Piechaczek
Linesmen:
(Switzerland) Nicolas Fluri
(United States) Paul Carnathan

Komarov (Pesonen, Kemppainen) – 05:53	1–0
Kontiola – 06:34	2–0
Barkov (Donskoi, Jokinen) – 21:19	3–0
Kemppainen (Ruutu, Aaltonen) (PP) – 35:57	4–0

4 min
Penalties
6 min
33
Shots
13

8 May 2015; 16:15	Slovenia	1–3 (0–1, 1–2, 0–0)	Norway	ČEZ Aréna, Ostrava; Attendance: 8,812

Game reference

Robert Kristan
Goalies
Lars Haugen
Referees:
(Switzerland) Daniel Stricker
(Sweden) Marcus Vinnerborg
Linesmen:
(Sweden) Jimmy Dahmen
(Estonia) Anton Semjonov

	0–1	Thoresen (M. Olimb, Holøs) (PP) – 08:23
Muršak (Kopitar, Kranjc) – 20:15	1–1
	1–2	Bastiansen(K. Olimb, Sørvik) (PP) – 23:46
	1–3	Holøs (M. Olimb, Thoresen) (PP) – 38:49

10 min
Penalties
4 min
18
Shots
24

8 May 2015; 20:15	United States	1–0 (0–0, 1–0, 0–0)	Denmark	ČEZ Aréna, Ostrava; Attendance: 8,812

Game reference
Connor Hellebuyck	Goalies	Sebastian Dahm	Referees: (Czech Republic) Pavel Hodek (Russia) Konstantin Olenin; Linesmen: (Czech Republic) Rudolf Tošenovjan (Canada) Bevan Mills
Nelson – 27:54 / 1–0			Referees: (Czech Republic) Pavel Hodek (Russia) Konstantin Olenin; Linesmen: (Czech Republic) Rudolf Tošenovjan (Canada) Bevan Mills
6 min	Penalties	6 min	Referees: (Czech Republic) Pavel Hodek (Russia) Konstantin Olenin; Linesmen: (Czech Republic) Rudolf Tošenovjan (Canada) Bevan Mills
41	Shots	21	Referees: (Czech Republic) Pavel Hodek (Russia) Konstantin Olenin; Linesmen: (Czech Republic) Rudolf Tošenovjan (Canada) Bevan Mills

9 May 2015; 12:15	Belarus	0–7 (0–1, 0–3, 0–3)	Russia	ČEZ Aréna, Ostrava; Attendance: 8,363

Game reference

Kevin Lalande
Igor Brikun
Goalies
Sergei Bobrovsky
Anton Khudobin
Referees:
(Switzerland) Daniel Stricker
(Germany) Daniel Piechaczek
Linesmen:
(Sweden) Jimmy Dahmen
(Switzerland) Nicolas Fluri

0–1	09:53 – Kovalchuk (Kulemin, Anisimov)
0–2	21:33 – Tarasenko (Anisimov, Medvedev)
0–3	29:24 – Shipachyov (Panarin, Dadonov)
0–4	32:22 – Panarin (Shipachyov, Mironov)
0–5	42:51 – Shirokov (PS)
0–6	44:49 – Dadonov (Malkin, Kovalchuk) (PP)
0–7	51:04 – Malkin (Tarasenko, Mozyakin) (PP)

18 min
Penalties
4 min
13
Shots
32

9 May 2015; 16:15	Finland	3–0 (0–0, 0–0, 3–0)	Slovakia	ČEZ Aréna, Ostrava; Attendance: 8,812

Game reference

Juuse Saros
Goalies
Ján Laco
Referees:
(Sweden) Marcus Vinnerborg
(Russia) Konstantin Olenin
Linesmen:
(Canada) Bevan Mills
(United States) Paul Carnathan

Donskoi (Lindell, Jokinen) – 50:28	1–0
Aaltonen (Pesonen, Kemppainen) – 55:33	2–0
Komarov (ENG) – 59:53	3–0

8 min
Penalties
10 min
31
Shots
22

9 May 2015; 20:15	Denmark	4–1 (2–1, 1–0, 1–0)	Norway	ČEZ Aréna, Ostrava; Attendance: 7,316

Game reference

Sebastian Dahm
Goalies
Lars Haugen
Referees:
(Sweden) Marcus Vinnerborg
(Russia) Konstantin Olenin
Linesmen:
(Canada) Bevan Mills
(United States) Paul Carnathan

N. Jensen (A. Poulsen) – 01:51	1–0
	1–1	03:18 – K. Olimb (Olsen, Bonsaksen)
Nielsen (Jakobsen, Madsen) (PP) – 19:36	2–1
Storm (J. Jensen, Nielsen) (PP) – 33:01	3–1
Jakobsen (Hardt, Madsen) – 51:36	4–1

8 min
Penalties
8 min
19
Shots
25

10 May 2015; 16:15	Slovenia	1–3 (0–2, 1–0, 0–1)	United States	ČEZ Aréna, Ostrava; Attendance: 8,202

Game reference

Robert Kristan
Goalies
Connor Hellebuyck
Referees:
(Finland) Aleksi Rantala
(Russia) Roman Gofman
Linesmen:
(Czech Republic) Rudolf Tošenovjan
(Estonia) Anton Semjonov

	0–1	04:17 – Nelson (Reilly, Lewis)
	0–2	16:32 – Nelson (Lewis, Faulk) (PP)
Mušič (Ograjenšek, Pretnar) – 26:54	1–2
	1–3	41:09 – Eichel (Nelson, Lewis)

4 min
Penalties
6 min
22
Shots
17

10 May 2015; 20:15	Slovakia	2–3 OT (1–0, 0–1, 1–1) (OT 0–1)	Russia	ČEZ Aréna, Ostrava; Attendance: 8,812

Game reference

Július Hudáček
Goalies
Sergei Bobrovsky
Referees:
(Czech Republic) Pavel Hodek
(Czech Republic) Vladimír Šindler
Linesmen:
(Switzerland) Nicolas Fluri
(Czech Republic) Vit Lederer

Kopecký (Pánik, Dravecký) – 05:58	1–0
	1–1	27:07 – Mozyakin (Chudinov, Kulemin) (PP)
	1–2	41:10 – Tarasenko (Antipin)
Gáborík (L. Hudáček) – 47:05	2–2
	2–3	62:06 – Panarin

4 min
Penalties
2 min
22
Shots
32

11 May 2015; 16:15	Finland	3–2 GWS (0–0, 0–0, 2–2) (OT 0–0) (SO: 1–0)	Belarus	ČEZ Aréna, Ostrava; Attendance: 8,812

Game reference

Pekka Rinne
Goalies
Vitali Koval
Referees:
(Switzerland) Daniel Stricker
(Switzerland) Tobias Wehrli
Linesmen:
(Czech Republic) Rudolf Tošenovjan
(Estonia) Anton Semjonov

	0–1	45:09 – Kovyrshin (Stepanov, Kulakov)
Donskoi (Lindell, Jokinen) (PP) – 51:57	1–1
Hartikainen (Jaakola, Kemppainen) – 52:51	2–1
	2–2	59:29 – Kalyuzhny (S. Kostitsyn) (EA)

Immonen
Donskoi
Jokinen
Shootout
(miss) S. Kostitsyn
Stepanov
8 min
Penalties
6 min
26
Shots
25

11 May 2015; 20:15	Slovenia	1–0 (1–0, 0–0, 0–0)	Denmark	ČEZ Aréna, Ostrava; Attendance: 6,768

Game reference
Gašper Krošelj	Goalies	Sebastian Dahm	Referees: (Sweden) Marcus Vinnerborg (Czech Republic) Vladimír Šindler; Linesmen: (United States) Paul Carnathan (Germany) André Schrader
Pance (Kovačevič, Kopitar) – 10:00 / 1–0			Referees: (Sweden) Marcus Vinnerborg (Czech Republic) Vladimír Šindler; Linesmen: (United States) Paul Carnathan (Germany) André Schrader
2 min	Penalties	2 min	Referees: (Sweden) Marcus Vinnerborg (Czech Republic) Vladimír Šindler; Linesmen: (United States) Paul Carnathan (Germany) André Schrader
21	Shots	24	Referees: (Sweden) Marcus Vinnerborg (Czech Republic) Vladimír Šindler; Linesmen: (United States) Paul Carnathan (Germany) André Schrader

12 May 2015; 12:15	Norway	2–3 (0–1, 1–2, 1–0)	Belarus	ČEZ Aréna, Ostrava; Attendance: 8,812

Game reference

Lars Haugen
Goalies
Kevin Lalande
Referees:
(Czech Republic) Pavel Hodek
(Sweden) Marcus Vinnerborg
Linesmen:
(Canada) Bevan Mills
(United States) Paul Carnathan

	0–1	07:29 – Kalyuzhny (S. Kostitsyn, A. Kostitsyn) (PP)
	0–2	29:01 – Korobov (S. Kostitsyn, Kalyuzhny) (PP)
	0–3	32:03 – A. Kostitsyn (Kalyuzhny, Stepanov) (PP)
Thoresen (M. Olimb, Holøs) – 32:20	1–3
Nørstebø (M. Olimb, Thoresen) – 45:13	2–3

16 min
Penalties
10 min
24
Shots
17

12 May 2015; 16:15	United States	5–4 OT (2–0, 2–4, 0–0) (OT 1–0)	Slovakia	ČEZ Aréna, Ostrava; Attendance: 8,812

Game reference

Connor Hellebuyck
Goalies
Ján Laco
Július Hudáček
Referees:
(Switzerland) Tobias Wehrli
(Germany) Daniel Piechaczek
Linesmen:
(Sweden) Jimmy Dahmen
(Switzerland) Nicolas Fluri

Smith (Moore, Arcobello) – 02:36	1–0
Jones (Eichel, Lewis) (PP) – 04:11	2–0
Lee (Faulk, Bonino) – 20:27	3–0
	3–1	26:29 – Gáborík (Dravecký, Meszároš) (PP)
	3–2	30:36 – Jánošík (Gáborík, Sersen)
	3–3	36:27 – Dravecký (Ďaloga, Kopecký)
	3–4	38:22 – Bartovič (Graňák)
Coyle (Redmond, Lee) – 39:08	4–4
Eichel – 64:32	5–4

10 min
Penalties
12 min
34
Shots
25

12 May 2015; 20:15	Finland	3–2 GWS (0–1, 1–0, 1–1) (OT 0–0) (SO: 1–0)	Russia	ČEZ Aréna, Ostrava; Attendance: 8,812

Game reference

Pekka Rinne
Goalies
Sergei Bobrovsky
Referees:
(Sweden) Mikael Nord
(Sweden) Tobias Bjork
Linesmen:
(Czech Republic) Vit Lederer
(Germany) André Schrader

	0–1	18:04 – Mozyakin (Malkin, Kulemin)
Barkov (Pesonen, Jokinen) (PP) – 24:54	1–1
	1–2	54:54 – Panarin (Dadonov, Chudinov)
Donskoi (Barkov, Jokinen) – 57:41	2–2

Immonen (miss)
Donskoi (miss)
Jokinen (miss)
Barkov (miss)
Donskoi
Shootout
(miss) Panarin
(miss) Mozyakin
(miss) Tarasenko
(miss) Kovalchuk
(miss) Panarin
25 min
Penalties
6 min
30
Shots
35

== Playoff round ==
Quarterfinals
A1	Canada	9
B4	Belarus	0
B2	Finland	3
A3	Czech Republic	5
B1	United States	3
A4	Switzerland	1
A2	Sweden	3
B3	Russia	5

Semifinals
A1	Canada	2
A3	Czech Republic	0
B1	United States	0
B3	Russia	4

Finals
A1	Canada	6
B3	Russia	1
Bronze medal game
B1	United States	3
A3	Czech Republic	0

=== Quarterfinals ===
14 May 2015; 15:15	United States	3–1 (0–1, 2–0, 1–0)	Switzerland	ČEZ Aréna, Ostrava; Attendance: 6,495

Game reference

Connor Hellebuyck
Goalies
Reto Berra
Referees:
(Russia) Vyacheslav Bulanov
(Finland) Jyri Rönn
Linesmen:
(Sweden) Jimmy Dahmen
(Canada) Bevan Mills

	0–1	13:04 – Josi
Smith (Vesey, Arcobello) – 30:17	1–1
Coyle (Jones, Lee) – 31:14	2–1
Gardiner (Coyle, Lee) – 50:33	3–1

6 min
Penalties
4 min
24
Shots
22

14 May 2015; 16:15	Canada	9–0 (4–0, 2–0, 3–0)	Belarus	O2 Arena, Prague; Attendance: 15,126

Game reference

Mike Smith
Goalies
Kevin Lalande
Referees:
(United States) Timothy Mayer
(Sweden) Marcus Vinnerborg
Linesmen:
(Czech Republic) Miroslav Lhotský
(Norway) Jon Killian

Burns (Crosby, Hall) – 00:27	1–0
Ennis (Barrie, Muzzin) – 07:36	2–0
O'Reilly (Burns) – 10:15	3–0
Seguin (Spezza) (PP) – 17:28	4–0
Seguin (Couturier, Muzzin) – 23:23	5–0
Burns (O'Reilly, Eberle) (PP) – 31:08	6–0
Seguin (Hall) (PP) – 50:32	7–0
O'Reilly (Giroux, Savard) – 53:02	8–0
Spezza (Burns) – 55:19	9–0

6 min
Penalties
10 min
50
Shots
24

14 May 2015; 19:15	Sweden	3–5 (0–2, 1–1, 2–2)	Russia	ČEZ Aréna, Ostrava; Attendance: 7,248

Game reference

Jhonas Enroth
Anders Nilsson
Goalies
Sergei Bobrovsky
Referees:
(Switzerland) Tobias Wehrli
(Czech Republic) Vladimír Šindler
Linesmen:
(Czech Republic) Vit Lederer
(United States) Paul Carnathan

	0–1	10:51 – Mozyakin (Malkin, Tarasenko) (PP2)
	0–2	16:01 – Shirokov (Tikhonov, Tarasenko)
	0–3	20:48 – Malkin (Kulemin, Belov)
Klingberg (Lander) (PP) – 31:01	1–3
Lander (Ekman-Larsson, Klingberg) – 43:36	2–3
Eriksson (Lander, Ekholm) – 54:45	3–3
	3–4	55:11 – Malkin (Mozyakin, Kulemin)
	3–5	58:13 – Tarasenko (ENG)

16 min
Penalties
14 min
28
Shots
28

14 May 2015; 20:15	Finland	3–5 (1–1, 1–2, 1–2)	Czech Republic	O2 Arena, Prague; Attendance: 17,383

Game reference

Pekka Rinne
Goalies
Ondřej Pavelec
Referees:
(Russia) Konstantin Olenin
(Russia) Roman Gofman
Linesmen:
(Russia) Gleb Lazarev
(United States) Fraser McIntyre

	0–1	08:56 – Kovář (Erat, Klepiš)
Ruutu (Kontiola, Lepistö) – 17:19	1–1
Jokinen (Lepistö, Donskoi) – 23:45	2–1
	2–2	33:51 – Jágr (Voráček, Kovář) (PP)
	2–3	35:28 – Kovář (Jágr, Voráček) (PP)
Barkov (Jokinen) – 44:24	3–3
	3–4	55:30 – Jágr
	3–5	59:37 – Sobotka (ENG)

10 min
Penalties
6 min
22
Shots
32

=== Semifinals ===
16 May 2015; 15:15	Canada	2–0 (1–0, 1–0, 0–0)	Czech Republic	O2 Arena, Prague; Attendance: 17,383

Game reference
Mike Smith	Goalies	Ondřej Pavelec	Referees: (Sweden) Marcus Vinnerborg (Russia) Vyacheslav Bulanov; Linesmen: (United States) Paul Carnathan (United States) Fraser McIntyre
Hall (Eberle, Crosby) – 08:40 / 1–0; Spezza (Duchene, Hamhuis) – 29:02 / 2–0			Referees: (Sweden) Marcus Vinnerborg (Russia) Vyacheslav Bulanov; Linesmen: (United States) Paul Carnathan (United States) Fraser McIntyre
4 min	Penalties	4 min	Referees: (Sweden) Marcus Vinnerborg (Russia) Vyacheslav Bulanov; Linesmen: (United States) Paul Carnathan (United States) Fraser McIntyre
41	Shots	23	Referees: (Sweden) Marcus Vinnerborg (Russia) Vyacheslav Bulanov; Linesmen: (United States) Paul Carnathan (United States) Fraser McIntyre

16 May 2015; 19:15	United States	0–4 (0–0, 0–0, 0–4)	Russia	O2 Arena, Prague; Attendance: 14,938

Game reference

Connor Hellebuyck
Goalies
Sergei Bobrovsky
Referees:
(Switzerland) Tobias Wehrli
(Finland) Jyri Rönn
Linesmen:
(Sweden) Jimmy Dahmen
(Canada) Bevan Mills

0–1	47:17 – Mozyakin (Bobrovsky)
0–2	50:19 – Ovechkin
0–3	55:28 – Shipachyov (Kulemin, Mozyakin)
0–4	58:35 – Malkin (Ovechkin) (ENG)

6 min
Penalties
4 min
35
Shots
30

=== Bronze medal game ===
17 May 2015; 16:15	United States	3–0 (2–0, 1–0, 0–0)	Czech Republic	O2 Arena, Prague; Attendance: 15,007

Game reference

Connor Hellebuyck
Goalies
Ondřej Pavelec
Referees:
(Sweden) Marcus Vinnerborg
(Finland) Jyri Rönn
Linesmen:
(Sweden) Jimmy Dahmen
(Russia) Gleb Lazarev

Bonino (Nelson, Coyle) – 07:25	1–0
Lewis (Eichel) – 18:13	2–0
Coyle (Bonino) – 39:10	3–0

12 min
Penalties
6 min
16
Shots
39

=== Gold medal game ===
17 May 2015; 20:45	Canada	6–1 (1–0, 3–0, 2–1)	Russia	O2 Arena, Prague; Attendance: 17,383

Game reference

Mike Smith
Goalies
Sergei Bobrovsky
Referees:
(Switzerland) Tobias Wehrli
(Czech Republic) Vladimír Šindler
Linesmen:
(United States) Paul Carnathan
(Czech Republic) Miroslav Lhotský

Eakin (Ennis, Muzzin) – 18:10	1–0
Ennis (Eakin, Couturier) – 21:56	2–0
Crosby (Eberle, Hamhuis) – 27:22	3–0
Seguin (Giroux, Barrie) – 28:06	4–0
Giroux (Crosby, O'Reilly) (PP) – 48:58	5–0
MacKinnon (Savard) – 49:50	6–0
	6–1	52:47 – Malkin (Mozyakin, Kulikov)

4 min
Penalties
10 min
37
Shots
12

== Ranking and statistics ==
2015 IIHF World Championship winners

Canada
25th title

=== Tournament Awards ===
- Best players selected by the directorate:
  - Best Goaltender: (Finland) Pekka Rinne
  - Best Defenceman: (Canada) Brent Burns
  - Best Forward: (Canada) Jason Spezza
  - Most Valuable Player: (Czech Republic) Jaromír Jágr

Source: IIHF.com

- Media All-Star Team:
  - Goaltender: (United States) Connor Hellebuyck
  - Defence: (Canada) Brent Burns, (Sweden) Oliver Ekman-Larsson
  - Forwards: (Canada) Taylor Hall, (Czech Republic) Jaromír Jágr, (Canada) Jason Spezza

Source: IIHF.com

=== Final ranking ===
The official IIHF final ranking of the tournament:

1st place, gold medalist(s)	Canada
2nd place, silver medalist(s)	Russia
3rd place, bronze medalist(s)	United States
4	Czech Republic
5	Sweden
6	Finland
7	Belarus
8	Switzerland
9	Slovakia
10	Germany
11	Norway
12	France
13	Latvia
14	Denmark
15	Austria
16	Slovenia

=== Scoring leaders ===
List shows the top skaters sorted by points, then goals.

Player	GP	G	A	Pts	+/−	PIM	POS
(Canada) Jason Spezza	10	6	8	14	+7	2	F
(Canada) Jordan Eberle	10	5	8	13	+8	0	F
(Canada) Taylor Hall	10	7	5	12	+8	6	F
(Russia) Sergei Mozyakin	10	6	6	12	+8	0	F
(Canada) Matt Duchene	10	4	8	12	+10	2	F
(Sweden) Oliver Ekman-Larsson	8	2	10	12	+4	6	D
(Canada) Sidney Crosby	9	4	7	11	+1	2	F
(Russia) Evgenii Dadonov	10	4	7	11	+4	2	F
(Finland) Jussi Jokinen	8	3	8	11	+3	0	F
(Canada) Brent Burns	10	2	9	11	+12	4	D
(Canada) Ryan O'Reilly	10	2	9	11	+10	0	F

GP = Games played; G = Goals; A = Assists; Pts = Points; +/− = Plus/minus; PIM = Penalties in minutes; POS = Position
Source: IIHF.com

=== Leading goaltenders ===
Only the top five goaltenders, based on save percentage, who have played at least 40% of their team's minutes, are included in this list.

Player	TOI	GA	GAA	SA	Sv%	SO
(United States) Connor Hellebuyck	482:00	11	1.37	211	94.79	2
(Denmark) Sebastian Dahm	297:19	11	2.22	161	93.17	0
(Canada) Mike Smith	480:00	12	1.50	172	93.02	2
(Finland) Pekka Rinne	427:16	12	1.69	166	92.77	3
(France) Cristobal Huet	287:46	10	2.09	129	92.25	1

TOI = Time on Ice (minutes:seconds); SA = Shots against; GA = Goals against; GAA = Goals against average; Sv% = Save percentage; SO = Shutouts
Source: IIHF.com

== IIHF honors and awards ==
The 2015 IIHF Hall of Fame inductees and award recipients were honored during the World Championship medal ceremonies in Prague.

IIHF Hall of Fame inductees

- Dominik Hašek, Czech Republic
- Scott Niedermayer, Canada
- Robert Reichel, Czech Republic
- Fran Rider, Canada
- Maria Rooth, Sweden

Award recipients

- Monique Scheier-Schneider of Luxembourg received the Paul Loicq Award for outstanding contributions to international ice hockey.
- Lucio Topatigh of Italy received the Torriani Award for a player with an outstanding career from non-top hockey nation.
