= 2013–14 HC Lev Praha season =

Czech ice hockey club season

2013–14 HC Lev Praha
- Division: 2nd Bobrov
- Conference: 3rd Western
- 2013–14 record: 23–12–6–13 (99 pts)
- Goals for: 149
- Goals against: 107

Team information
- President: (Russia) Yevgeny Myshkovsky
- Coach: (Czech Republic) Václav Sýkora
- Assistant coach: (Czech Republic) Jan Votruba (Italy) Ivano Zanatta
- Captain: (Czech Republic) Jiří Novotný
- Alternate captains: (Finland) Niko Kapanen (Canada) Nathan Oystrick
- Arena: Tipsport Arena
- Average attendance: 4,321 (32.86%)

The 2013–14 HC Lev Praha season is the second season for Prague based club in Kontinental Hockey League.

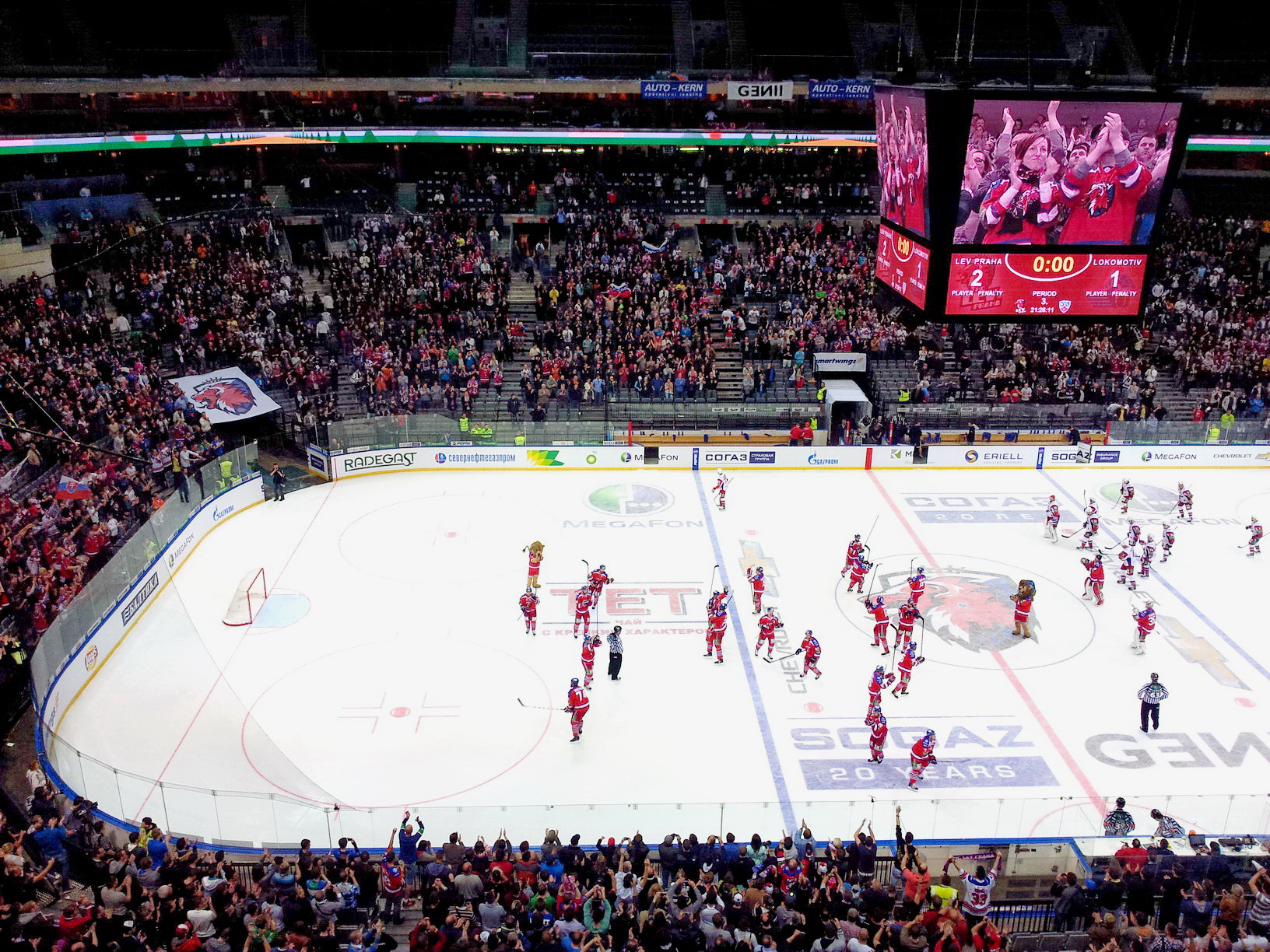
KHL Lev Praha vs. Lokomotiv Yaroslavl (2014) in Prague O2 arena

== Standings ==
D	C	Team	GP	W	OTW	OTL	L	GF	GA	PTS
2	3	HC Lev Praha	54	23	12	6	13	149	107	99

== Schedule and results ==
=== Pre-season ===
Pre-season took part in August and September.

2013–14 Game Log
Pre-season: 0–0–0–0 (Home: 0–0–0–0; Road: 0–0–0–0; Neutral: 0–0–0–0)

#	Date	Home team	Score	Away team	Arena	Attendance	Recap
1							

== Final roster ==
Updated April 7, 2014.

No.	Nat	Player	Pos	S/G	Age	Acquired	Birthplace
35	(Finland)	Petri Vehanen	G	L	47	2013	Rauma, Finland
29	(Czech Republic)	Jan Lukáš	G	L	32	2013	Olomouc, Czech Republic
36	(Finland)	Atte Engren	G	L	37	2013	Rauma, Finland
3	(Finland)	Topi Jaakola	D	L	41	2013	Oulu, Finland
5	(Canada)	Marc-André Gragnani	D	L	38	2013	L'Île-Bizard, Canada
58	(Canada)	Spencer Humphries	D	R	33	2013	Delta, Canada
24	(Canada)	Ryan O'Byrne	D	R	41	2013	Victoria, Canada
55	(Czech Republic)	Martin Ševc	D	L	43	2013	Kladno, Czechoslovakia
63	(Czech Republic)	Ondřej Němec	D	R	41	2012	Třebíč, Czechoslovakia
66	(Slovakia)	Juraj Mikuš	D	L	36	2012	Trenčín, Czechoslovakia
74	(Canada)	Nathan Oystrick (A)	D	L	42	2012	Regina, Canada
87	(Czech Republic)	Jakub Nakládal	D	R	37	2012	Hradec Králové, Czechoslovakia
7	(Finland)	Mikko Mäenpää	D	L	42	2012	Tampere, Finland
16	(Czech Republic)	Michal Birner	LW	L	39	2012	Litoměřice, Czechoslovakia
22	(Sweden)	Calle Ridderwall	LW	L	37	2013	Stockholm, Sweden
67	(Sweden)	Martin Thörnberg	LW	L	42	2013	Jönköping, Sweden
95	(Czech Republic)	Jakub Matai	C/LW	L	32	2013	Kadaň, Czech Republic
12	(Czech Republic)	Jiří Novotný (C)	C	R	42	2012	Pelhřimov, Czechoslovakia
15	(Canada)	Justin Azevedo	C	R	37	2013	West Lorne, Canada
19	(Sweden)	Patrik Zackrisson	C	R	38	2013	Ekerö, Sweden
20	(Czech Republic)	Petr Vrána	C	L	40	2012	Šternberk, Czechoslovakia
39	(Finland)	Niko Kapanen (A)	C	L	47	2013	Hattula, Finland
64	(Czech Republic)	Jiří Sekáč	C	L	33	2012	Kladno, Czechoslovakia
42	(Sweden)	David Ullström	C	L	36	2013	Jönköping, Sweden
26	(Czech Republic)	Michal Řepík	RW	R	36	2012	Vlašim, Czechoslovakia
90	(Czech Republic)	Dominik Pacovský	RW	L	35	2013	Prague, Czechoslovakia
62	(Slovakia)	Lukáš Cingeľ	RW	L	33	2012	Žilina, Czechoslovakia
18	(Czech Republic)	Tomáš Kubalík	RW	R	35	2013	Plzeň, Czechoslovakia
21	(Czech Republic)	Jakub Klepiš	RW	R	41	2012	Prague, Czechoslovakia
