= Zaťovič =

Zaťovič, feminine: Zatovičová is a Slovak-language surname derived from the word zať, son-in-law. Notable people with the surname include:

- Juraj Zaťovič (born 1982), Slovak water polo player
- Martin Zaťovič (born 1985), Czech ice hockey player
- Mária Zatovičová, Slovak paralympic skier

== See also ==
- Zetov
