= Florian Mühlstein =

Austrian ice hockey player (born 1990)

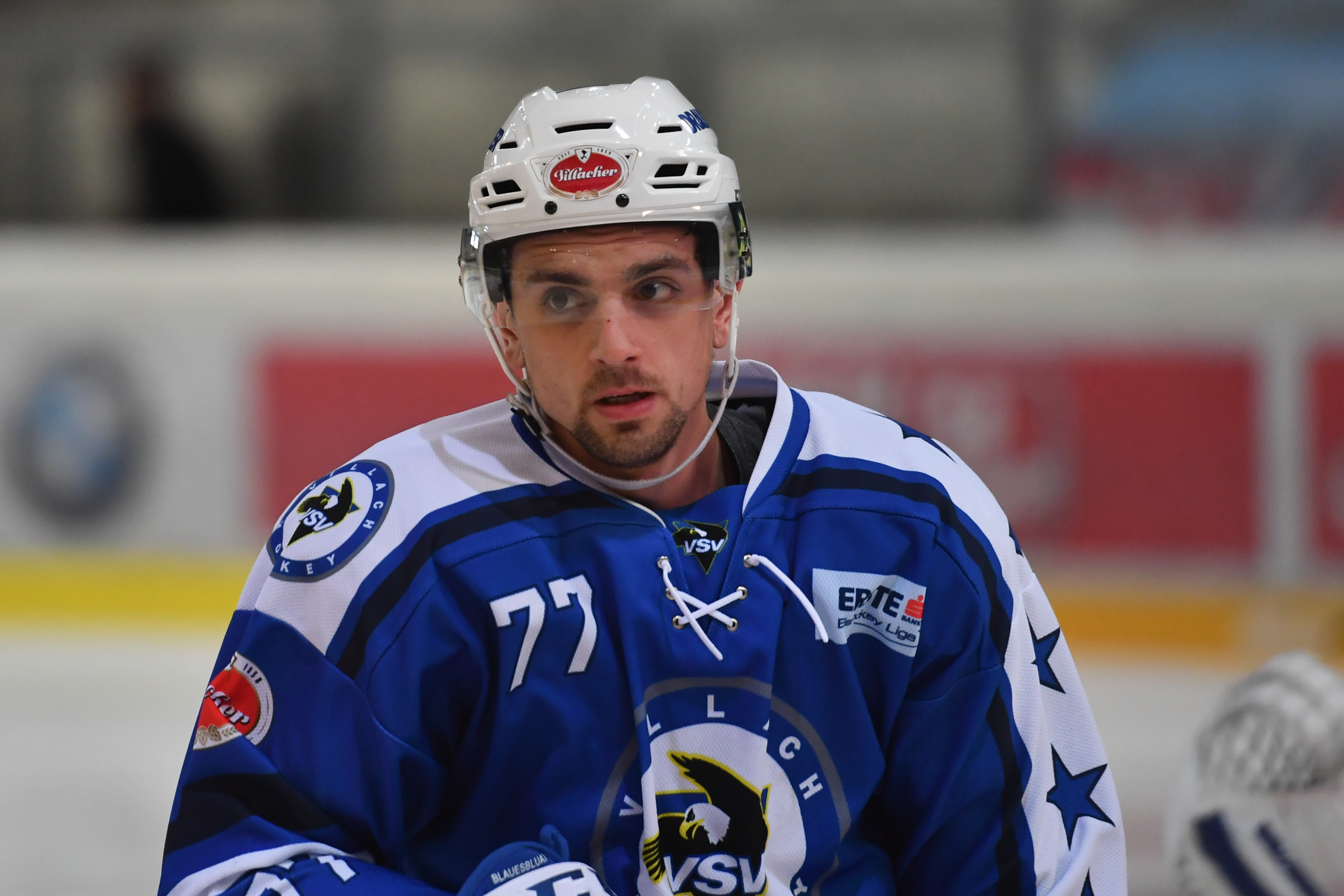
- Born: 12 November 1990 (age 35) Villach, Austria
- Height: 6 ft 0 in (183 cm)
- Weight: 190 lb (86 kg; 13 st 8 lb)
- Position: Defence
- Shoots: Left
- EBEL team Former teams: Free Agent; EC KAC; EC Red Bull Salzburg; EC VSV
- National team: Austria
- Playing career: 2008–present

Florian Mühlstein (born 12 November 1990) is an Austrian professional ice hockey defenseman currently an unrestricted free agent. He most recently played for EC VSV of the Austrian Hockey League (EBEL). He has previously played in the EBEL for EC KAC and EC Red Bull Salzburg.

After winning the 2014–15 Championship with Salzburg, Mühlstein returned to his hometown of Villach, signing a one-year contract with EC VSV on 4 March 2015.

He participated with the Austrian national team at the 2015 IIHF World Championship.
