= Matthias Bieber =

Swiss ice hockey player (born 1986)

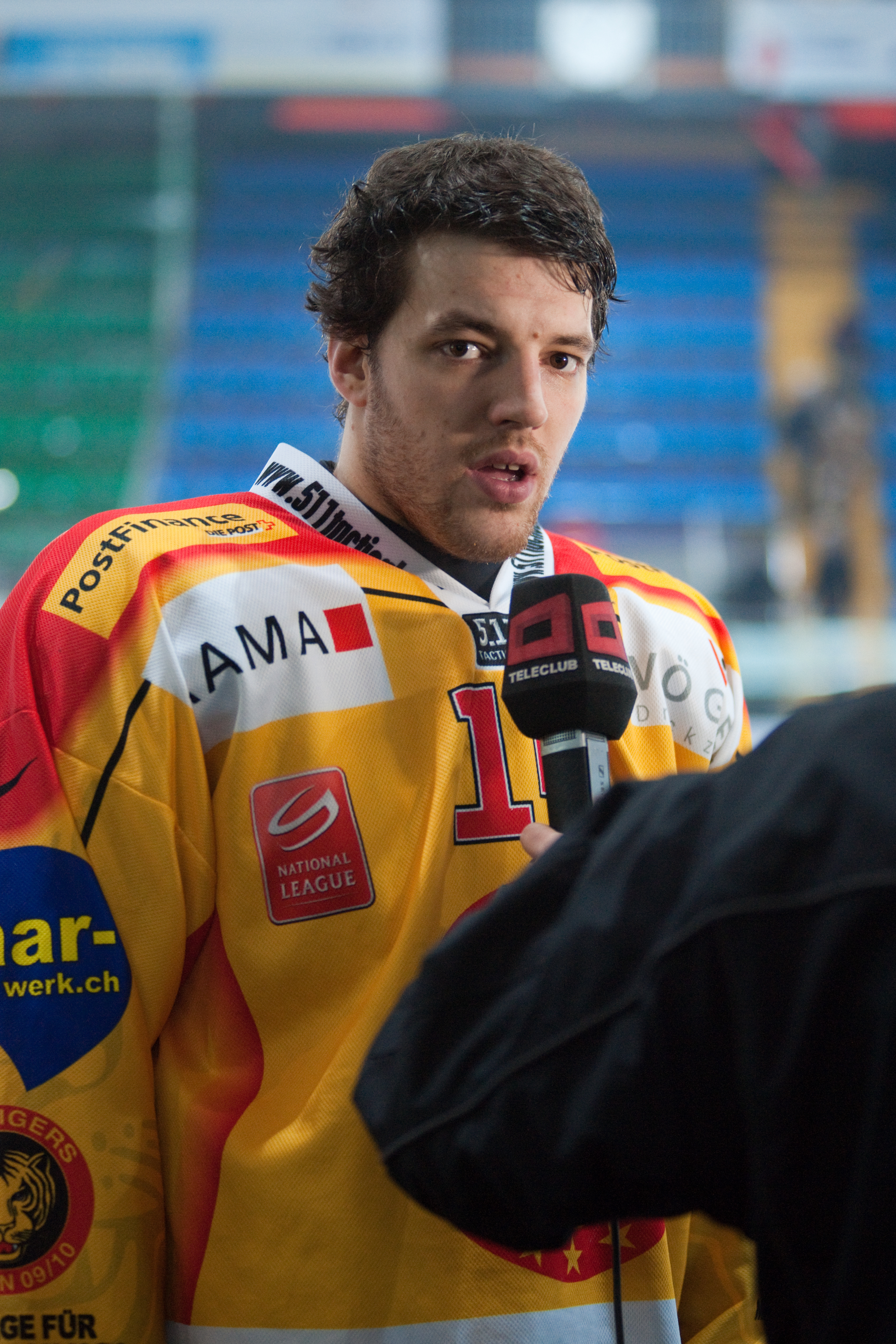
- Born: 14 March 1986 (age 39); Zürich, Switzerland
- Height: 5 ft 11 in (180 cm)
- Weight: 194 lb (88 kg; 13 st 12 lb)
- Position: Forward
- Shot: Left
- Played for: ZSC Lions; SCL Tigers; EHC Kloten; SC Bern
- National team: Switzerland
- Playing career: 2003–2020

Matthias Bieber (born 14 March 1986) is a Swiss former professional ice hockey player. He played for ZSC Lions, SCL Tigers, EHC Kloten and SC Bern in the National League (NL)

== Playing career ==
On 16 November 2012 he was signed to a five-year contract extension by the Kloten Flyers.

== International play ==
Bieber participated at the 2011 IIHF World Championship as a member of the Switzerland men's national ice hockey team.

== Career statistics ==
=== Regular season and playoffs ===
			Regular season					Playoffs
Season	Team	League	GP	G	A	Pts	PIM	GP	G	A	Pts	PIM
2001–02	GCK Lions	SUI U20	10	0	0	0	4	2	0	0	0	0
2002–03	GCK Lions	SUI U20	34	9	5	14	37	5	1	1	2	4
2002–03	GCK Lions	SUI.2	6	1	1	2	0	7	0	0	0	0
2002–03	EHC Dübendorf	SUI.3	1	0	0	0	0	—	—	—	—	—
2003–04	GCK Lions	SUI U20	6	3	3	6	12	—	—	—	—	—
2003–04	GCK Lions	SUI.2	30	1	4	5	26	6	1	3	4	12
2004–05	GCK Lions	SUI U20	4	2	0	2	2	—	—	—	—	—
2004–05	GCK Lions	SUI.2	36	5	7	12	18	3	0	0	0	0
2004–05	ZSC Lions	NLA	3	0	0	0	0	—	—	—	—	—
2005–06	GCK Lions	SUI U20	6	2	2	4	2	—	—	—	—	—
2005–06	GCK Lions	SUI.2	14	11	5	16	8	—	—	—	—	—
2005–06	ZSC Lions	NLA	25	2	2	4	6	—	—	—	—	—
2006–07	GCK Lions	SUI.2	4	2	1	3	0	—	—	—	—	—
2006–07	ZSC Lions	NLA	43	1	1	2	10	6	0	0	0	2
2007–08	SCL Tigers	NLA	46	6	5	11	34	—	—	—	—	—
2008–09	SCL Tigers	NLA	48	5	8	13	10	—	—	—	—	—
2009–10	SCL Tigers	NLA	36	14	8	22	28	—	—	—	—	—
2010–11	Kloten Flyers	NLA	46	19	15	34	18	18	2	3	5	0
2011–12	Kloten Flyers	NLA	43	9	9	18	6	5	0	0	0	0
2012–13	Kloten Flyers	NLA	45	12	14	26	4	—	—	—	—	—
2013–14	Kloten Flyers	NLA	50	16	17	33	6	16	4	4	8	4
2014–15	Kloten Flyers	NLA	50	17	7	24	12	—	—	—	—	—
2015–16	Kloten Flyers	NLA	45	15	14	29	10	4	0	0	0	0
2016–17	EHC Kloten	NLA	33	4	8	12	6	—	—	—	—	—
2017–18	EHC Kloten	NL	33	4	2	6	4	—	—	—	—	—
2018–19	SC Bern	NL	44	5	9	14	6	18	1	2	3	2
2019–20	SC Bern	NL	14	0	0	0	4	—	—	—	—	—
NL totals			604	129	119	248	164	67	7	9	16	8

Medal record

Ice hockey

Representing Switzerland

World Championships
Silver medal – second place	2013 Sweden/Finland	

=== International ===
Year	Team	Event	Result	GP	G	A	Pts	PIM
2004	Switzerland	WJC18 D1	11th	5	3	0	3	2
2005	Switzerland	WJC	12th	6	0	0	0	2
2006	Switzerland	WJC	8th	6	0	7	7	10
2011	Switzerland	WC	9th	6	0	1	1	2
2012	Switzerland	WC	11th	7	0	1	1	4
2013	Switzerland	WC	2nd place, silver medalist(s)	10	2	1	3	2
2014	Switzerland	OG	9th	4	0	0	0	0
2015	Switzerland	WC	8th	8	2	0	2	0
Junior totals				17	3	7	10	14
Senior totals				35	4	3	7	8

== Awards and honours ==
Award	Year
NL
Champion (SC Bern)	2019
