= Damien Brunner =

Swiss ice hockey player (born 1986)

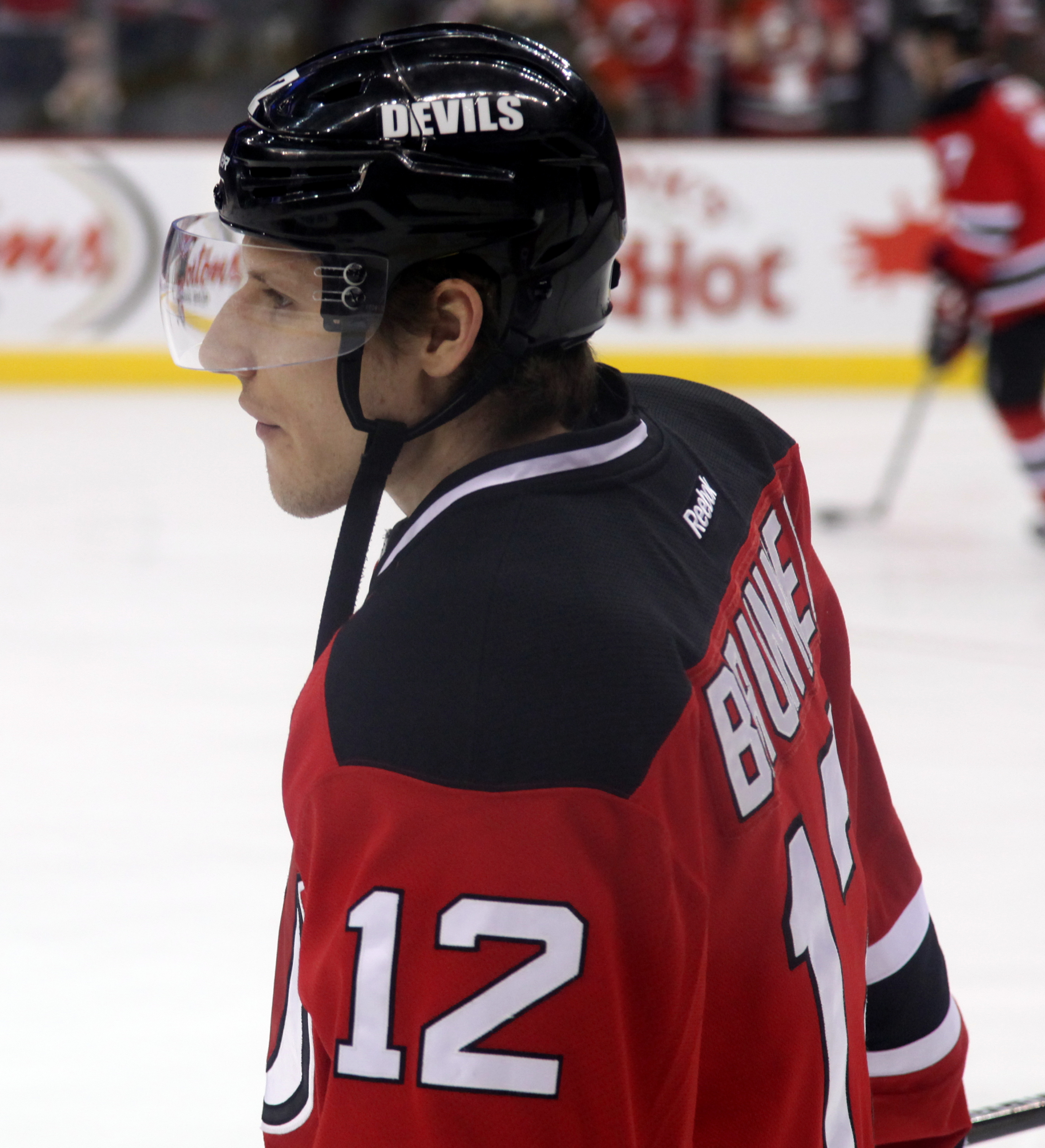
- Brunner with the Devils in 2014
- Born: March 9, 1986 (age 40)
- Height: 5 ft 11 in (180 cm)
- Weight: 187 lb (85 kg; 13 st 5 lb)
- Position: Left wing
- Shoots: Right
- NL team Former teams: EHC Biel; Kloten Flyers; HC Thurgau; EV Zug; Detroit Red Wings; New Jersey Devils; HC Lugano
- National team: Switzerland
- NHL draft: Undrafted
- Playing career: 2006–present

Damien Brunner (born March 9, 1986) is a Swiss former professional ice hockey forward who last played for EHC Biel of the National League (NL). He has also played in the National Hockey League for the Detroit Red Wings and the New Jersey Devils.

== Playing career ==
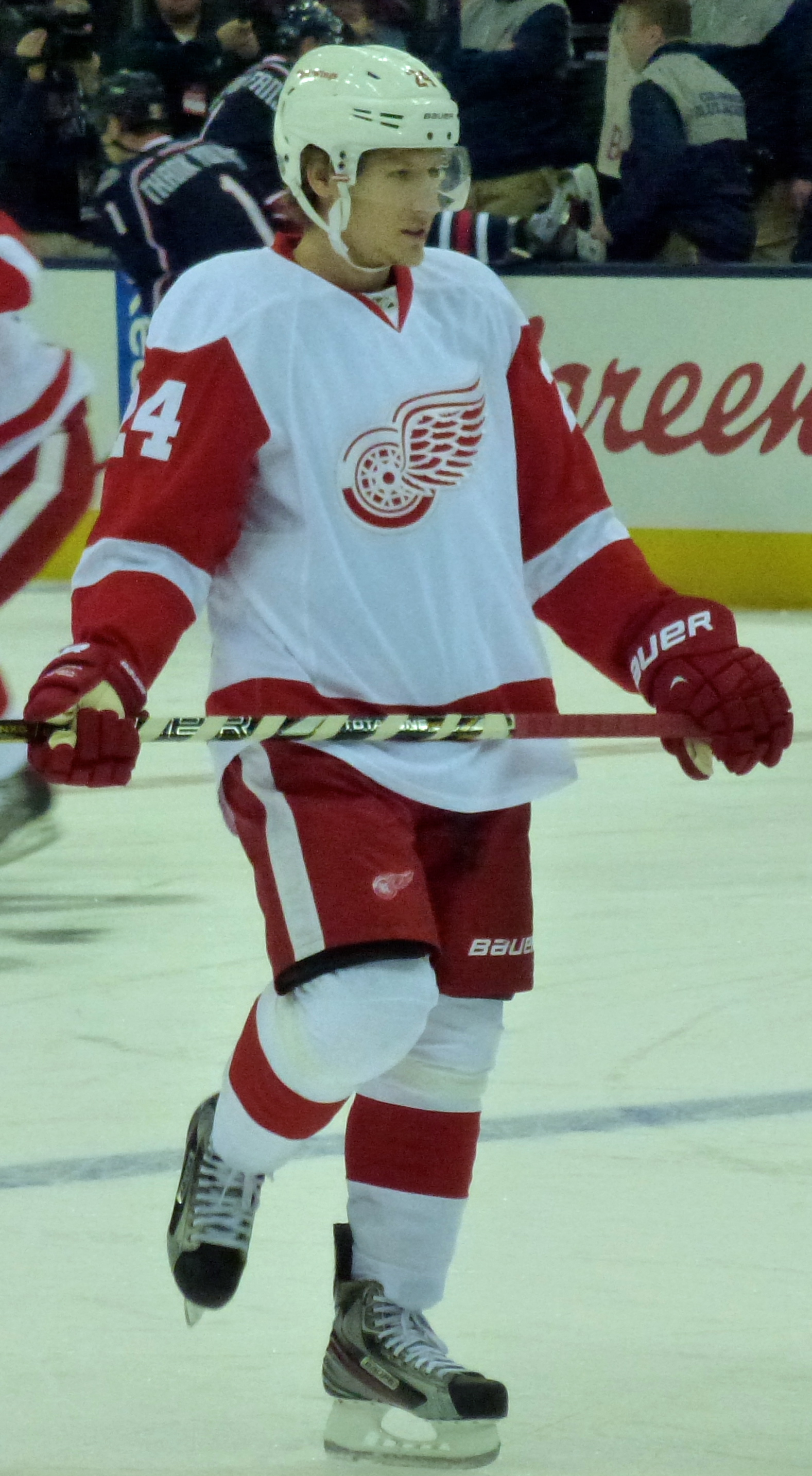
Brunner as a member of the Detroit Red Wings.

As a youth, Brunner played in the 1999 and 2000 Quebec International Pee-Wee Hockey Tournaments with a team from Zürich.

He played for the Kloten Flyers of the National League A in 2006–07 and 2007–08. In 2008–09, he moved to EV Zug. In 2011–12, Brunner had 60 points in 45 games. He led the NLA in points and was named the league's forward of the year.

On July 1, 2012, Brunner signed a one-year entry-level contract with the Detroit Red Wings of the NHL. He then returned to EV Zug for the 2012–13 season until the 2012–13 NHL lockout was resolved, where he started the shortened season with the Red Wings. He netted the game-winning shootout goal against the Columbus Blue Jackets, in his second game with the Red Wings. He scored his first NHL goal the next day against Kari Lehtonen of the Dallas Stars.

Brunner played in the 2010 IIHF World Championship as a member of the Switzerland men's national ice hockey team.

After turning down two and three-year contract offers from the Detroit Red Wings, Brunner became an Unrestricted Free Agent. On September 16, 2013 he was signed by the New Jersey Devils on a pro tryout contract and attended the team's training camp. On September 24, 2013, he was signed by the New Jersey Devils to a two-year, $5 million contract.

On December 5, 2014, the Devils placed Brunner on waivers after he was benched for the entire third period in a 5–3 win against the Toronto Maple Leafs on December 4. He cleared waivers the following day. He had 2 goals and 5 assists in 17 games. With little interest in playing in the American Hockey League, Brunner agreed to mutually terminate his contract with the Devils and on December 12, 2014, he returned to Switzerland where he signed a five-year contract with HC Lugano worth CHF 6 million.

Near the end of the 2017–18 regular season, Brunner broke his leg, forcing him to sit out the end of the regular season as well as the playoffs.

On May 19, 2018, Brunner and HC Lugano parted ways - with one year remaining on his contract - and immediately signed a two-year deal worth CHF 2 million with EHC Biel.

On August 26, 2019, Brunner was signed to an early three-year contract extension by Biel through the 2022–23 season.

After more than six seasons in Biel, Brunner was limited to only six games due to injury in 2024-25 and announced his retirement on January 24, 2025.

== Career statistics ==
=== Regular season and playoffs ===
| | | | Regular season | | | | | Playoffs |
| Season | Team | League | GP | G | A | Pts | PIM | GP | G | A | Pts | PIM |
|---|---|---|---|---|---|---|---|---|---|---|---|---|
| 2002–03 | Kloten Flyers | SUI U20 | 6 | 1 | 0 | 1 | 0 | — | — | — | — | — |
| 2003–04 | Kloten Flyers | SUI U20 | 21 | 9 | 5 | 14 | 8 | — | — | — | — | — |
| 2004–05 | Kloten Flyers | SUI U20 | 43 | 33 | 24 | 57 | 62 | 9 | 6 | 1 | 7 | 26 |
| 2005–06 | Kloten Flyers | SUI U20 | 18 | 13 | 25 | 38 | 28 | — | — | — | — | — |
| 2005–06 | EHC Winterthur | SUI.3 | 17 | 18 | 11 | 29 | 28 | 7 | 5 | 6 | 11 | 4 |
| 2006–07 | Kloten Flyers | NLA | 42 | 9 | 9 | 18 | 22 | 11 | 1 | 0 | 1 | 4 |
| 2007–08 | Kloten Flyers | NLA | 50 | 5 | 2 | 7 | 6 | 5 | 0 | 0 | 0 | 0 |
| 2008–09 | Kloten Flyers | NLA | 12 | 0 | 0 | 0 | 2 | — | — | — | — | — |
| 2008–09 | HC Thurgau | NLB | 3 | 1 | 3 | 4 | 4 | — | — | — | — | — |
| 2008–09 | EV Zug | NLA | 35 | 12 | 14 | 26 | 16 | 10 | 3 | 2 | 5 | 4 |
| 2009–10 | EV Zug | NLA | 47 | 23 | 35 | 58 | 22 | 13 | 5 | 5 | 10 | 6 |
| 2010–11 | EV Zug | NLA | 40 | 19 | 27 | 46 | 34 | 8 | 4 | 4 | 8 | 2 |
| 2011–12 | EV Zug | NLA | 45 | 24 | 36 | 60 | 48 | 9 | 3 | 11 | 14 | 6 |
| 2012–13 | EV Zug | NLA | 33 | 25 | 32 | 57 | 49 | — | — | — | — | — |
| 2012–13 | Detroit Red Wings | NHL | 44 | 12 | 14 | 26 | 12 | 14 | 5 | 4 | 9 | 4 |
| 2013–14 | New Jersey Devils | NHL | 60 | 11 | 14 | 25 | 26 | — | — | — | — | — |
| 2014–15 | New Jersey Devils | NHL | 17 | 2 | 5 | 7 | 8 | — | — | — | — | — |
| 2014–15 | HC Lugano | NLA | 20 | 11 | 5 | 16 | 30 | 3 | 0 | 1 | 1 | 0 |
| 2015–16 | HC Lugano | NLA | 36 | 13 | 21 | 34 | 18 | 14 | 7 | 7 | 14 | 12 |
| 2016–17 | HC Lugano | NLA | 33 | 8 | 18 | 26 | 45 | 2 | 0 | 1 | 1 | 2 |
| 2017–18 | HC Lugano | NL | 24 | 7 | 7 | 14 | 8 | — | — | — | — | — |
| 2018–19 | EHC Biel | NL | 50 | 18 | 19 | 37 | 22 | 12 | 5 | 4 | 9 | 4 |
| 2019–20 | EHC Biel | NL | 23 | 9 | 8 | 17 | 4 | — | — | — | — | — |
| 2020–21 | EHC Biel | NL | 29 | 11 | 14 | 25 | 43 | 2 | 1 | 0 | 1 | 0 |
| 2021–22 | EHC Biel | NL | 44 | 21 | 23 | 44 | 22 | 4 | 1 | 0 | 1 | 0 |
| NL totals | | | 563 | 215 | 270 | 485 | 389 | 93 | 30 | 35 | 65 | 40 |
| NHL totals | | | 121 | 25 | 33 | 58 | 46 | 14 | 5 | 4 | 9 | 4 |

=== International ===
| Year | Team | Event | Result | GP | G | A | Pts | PIM |
|---|---|---|---|---|---|---|---|---|
| 2010 | Switzerland | WC | 5th | 7 | 1 | 4 | 5 | 2 |
| 2012 | Switzerland | WC | 11th | 7 | 3 | 4 | 7 | 6 |
| 2014 | Switzerland | OG | 9th | 4 | 0 | 0 | 0 | 0 |
| 2014 | Switzerland | WC | 10th | 7 | 3 | 3 | 6 | 4 |
| 2015 | Switzerland | WC | 8th | 8 | 1 | 4 | 5 | 8 |
| 2017 | Switzerland | WC | 6th | 7 | 2 | 1 | 3 | 4 |
| Senior totals | | | | 40 | 10 | 16 | 26 | 24 |
