= Alexei Kalyuzhny =

Belarusian ice hockey player

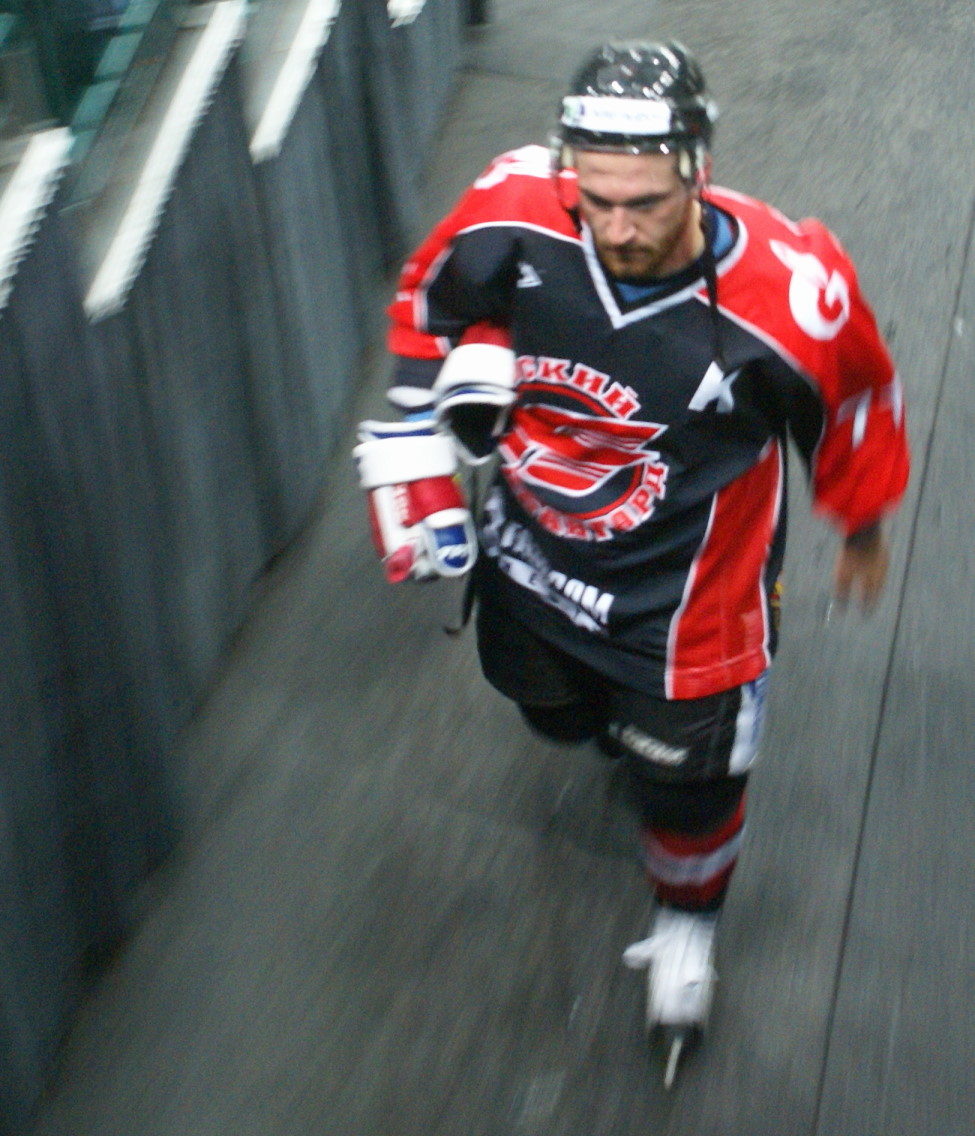
- Kalyuzhny in 2007
- Born: June 13, 1977 (age 47); Minsk, Byelorussian SSR, Soviet Union
- Height: 5 ft 10 in (178 cm)
- Weight: 190 lb (86 kg; 13 st 8 lb)
- Position: Centre
- Shot: Left
- Played for: Dynamo Moscow; Neftekhimik Nizhnekamsk; Metallurg Magnitogorsk; HC Severstal; Yunost Minsk; Avangard Omsk; Lokomotiv Yaroslavl; Dinamo Minsk
- National team: Belarus
- Playing career: 1995–2016

Alexei Nikolayevich Kalyuzhny (Belarusian: Аляксей Мікалаевіч Калюжны, Alaksej Mikałajevič Kalužny, Russian: Алексей Николаевич Калюжный) (born June 13, 1977) is a Belarusian former professional ice hockey forward. He last played for HC Dinamo Minsk of the Kontinental Hockey League. He participated at the 2010 IIHF World Championship as a member of the Belarus National men's ice hockey team.

== Career statistics ==
=== Regular season and playoffs ===
			Regular season					Playoffs
Season	Team	League	GP	G	A	Pts	PIM	GP	G	A	Pts	PIM
1993–94	Dynamo–2 Moscow	RUS.3	38	3	4	7	26	—	—	—	—	—
1994–95	Dynamo Moscow	IHL	2	0	0	0	2	—	—	—	—	—
1994–95	Dynamo–2 Moscow	RUS.2	53	15	9	24	24	—	—	—	—	—
1995–96	Neftekhimik Nizhnekamsk	IHL	44	5	3	8	24	—	—	—	—	—
1996–97	Dynamo Moscow	RSL	29	6	6	12	12	4	3	0	3	2
1996–97	Dynamo–2 Moscow	RUS.3	5	0	1	1	6	—	—	—	—	—
1997–98	Dynamo Moscow	RSL	43	9	10	19	30	12	0	2	2	12
1998–99	Dynamo Moscow	RSL	40	5	5	10	10	16	4	1	5	6
1999–2000	Dynamo Moscow	RSL	38	3	9	12	20	17	1	3	4	4
2000–01	Metallurg Magnitogorsk	RSL	42	8	19	27	20	12	3	8	11	8
2000–01	Metallurg–2 Magnitogorsk	RUS.3	2	0	2	2	2	—	—	—	—	—
2001–02	Metallurg Magnitogorsk	RSL	41	12	14	26	22	9	2	2	4	6
2002–03	Severstal Cherepovets	RSL	50	10	23	33	38	12	2	3	5	8
2003–04	Severstal Cherepovets	RSL	56	11	21	32	58	—	—	—	—	—
2003–04	Yunost Minsk	BLR	—	—	—	—	—	6	2	3	5	4
2004–05	Avangard Omsk	RSL	60	14	17	31	32	11	0	4	4	4
2005–06	Avangard Omsk	RSL	50	12	23	35	30	13	4	5	9	0
2006–07	Avangard Omsk	RSL	54	18	45	63	24	11	5	4	9	8
2007–08	Avangard Omsk	RSL	56	25	33	58	24	4	3	1	4	2
2008–09	Dynamo Moscow	KHL	51	12	19	31	4	12	6	3	9	6
2009–10	Dynamo Moscow	KHL	56	11	17	28	18	4	1	0	1	4
2010–11	Avangard Omsk	KHL	39	14	17	31	24	14	4	2	6	4
2011–12	Avangard Omsk	KHL	41	6	15	21	18	18	1	4	5	0
2012–13	Lokomotiv Yaroslavl	KHL	52	8	15	23	26	6	2	2	4	2
2013–14	Dinamo Minsk	KHL	51	11	15	26	8	—	—	—	—	—
2014–15	Dinamo Minsk	KHL	48	7	27	34	8	4	0	1	1	4
2015–16	Dinamo Minsk	KHL	53	10	21	31	26	—	—	—	—	—
RSL totals			559	133	225	358	320	121	27	33	60	60
KHL totals			391	79	146	225	132	58	14	12	26	20

=== International ===
Year	Team	Event	GP	G	A	Pts	PIM
1996	Belarus	WJC C	4	0	4	4	2
1997	Belarus	WJC C	4	2	11	13	0
1997	Belarus	WC B	7	3	1	4	4
1998	Belarus	OG	7	1	0	1	6
1998	Belarus	WC	6	1	4	5	2
1999	Belarus	WC	6	1	1	2	6
2000	Belarus	WC	6	1	2	3	12
2001	Belarus	OGQ	3	0	2	2	0
2001	Belarus	WC	6	2	1	3	4
2002	Belarus	OLY	9	1	1	2	0
2002	Belarus	WC D1	5	6	13	19	6
2003	Belarus	WC	6	1	3	4	4
2004	Belarus	WC D1	5	3	7	10	4
2005	Belarus	OGQ	2	0	2	2	2
2008	Belarus	WC	6	1	3	4	4
2009	Belarus	WC	5	1	5	6	0
2010	Belarus	OLY	4	3	1	4	2
2010	Belarus	WC	6	4	2	6	4
2012	Belarus	WC	7	3	2	5	2
2013	Belarus	OGQ	2	1	0	1	0
2014	Belarus	WC	7	1	6	7	2
2015	Belarus	WC	8	5	5	10	6
2016	Belarus	WC	5	1	0	1	2
Junior totals			8	2	15	17	2
Senior totals			118	40	61	101	72
