= Joonas Kemppainen =

Finnish ice hockey player (born 1988)

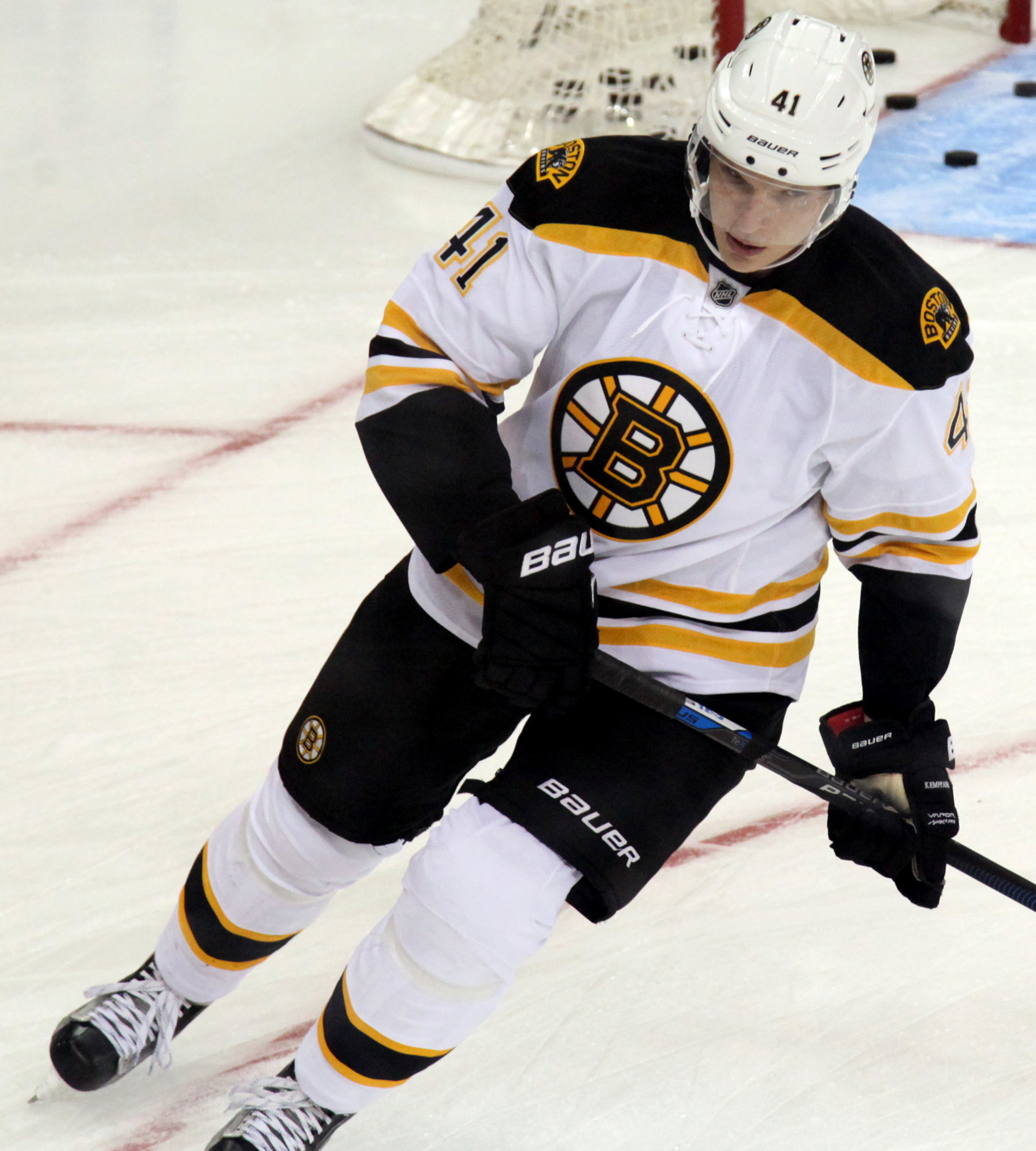
- Kemppainen in September 2015
- Born: 7 April 1988 (age 38) Kajaani, Finland
- Height: 6 ft 2 in (188 cm)
- Weight: 220 lb (100 kg; 15 st 10 lb)
- Position: Forward
- Shot: Left
- Played for: Ässät; HPK; Boston Bruins; Sibir Novosibirsk; Salavat Yulaev Ufa; SKA Saint Petersburg; Oulun Kärpät
- National team: Finland
- NHL draft: Undrafted
- Playing career: 2006–2025

Joonas Kemppainen (born 7 April 1988) is a Finnish former professional ice hockey forward who played in the National Hockey League (NHL) for the Boston Bruins and most recently played for Oulun Kärpät in the Liiga.

== Playing career ==
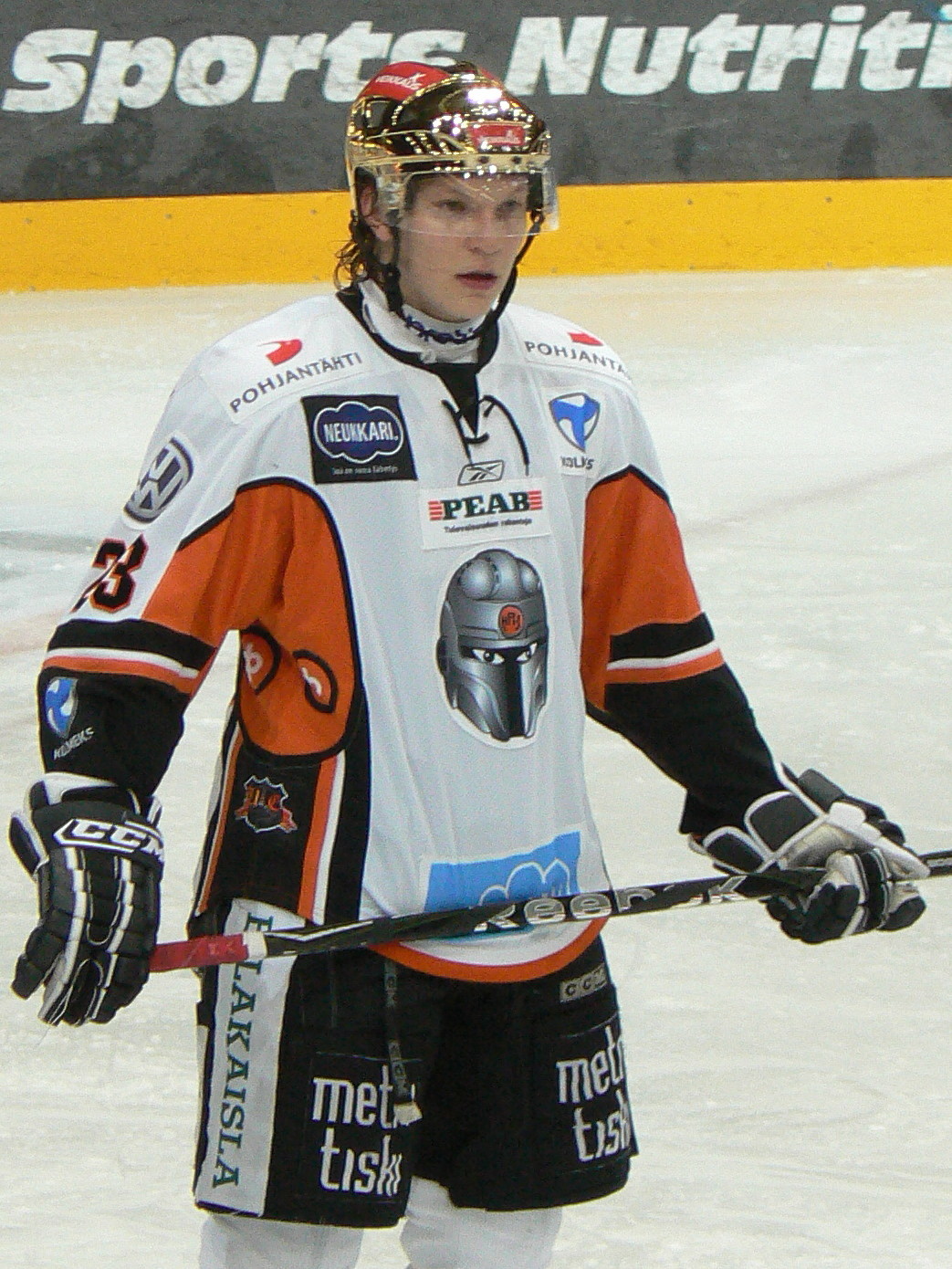
Kemppainen in 2009.

Undrafted, Kemppainen played nine seasons in the Finnish Liiga with Ässät, HPK and Oulun Kärpät. After his second consecutive season of 30 plus points with Kärpät in the 2014–15 season, on 21 May 2015, Boston Bruins general manager Don Sweeney announced that the club had signed Kemppainen to a one-year, two-way NHL contract for the 2015–16 season.

He picked up his first NHL assist and scored his first NHL goal on 23 October 2015, against Jaroslav Halák of the New York Islanders in a 5-3 Bruins victory.

Less than a year after coming to the United States, Kemppainen signed a deal with KHL hockey club Sibir Novosibirsk on 14 May 2016.

Following two productive seasons with Salavat Yulaev Ufa, including reaching the Eastern Conference Finals in the 2018–19 season, posting 14 points in 17 games, Kemppaninen secured a lucrative one-year contract with SKA Saint Petersburg on 1 May 2019.

Kemppainen played three seasons with SKA Saint Petersburg before leaving following the 2021–22 campaign to return to his native Finland on a one-year contract with his former club, Kärpät of the Liiga, on 27 April 2022.

After recording 37 points in 67 Liiga regular-season and playoff games in 2023–24, Kemppainen sat out most of the 2024–25 season before finally announcing his retirement at age 36 on 20 February 2025.

== International play ==
Kemppainen competed in the 2015 IIHF World Championships, finishing third on Team Finland in scoring in his debut senior tournament.

== Career statistics ==
=== Regular season and playoffs ===
			Regular season					Playoffs
Season	Team	League	GP	G	A	Pts	PIM	GP	G	A	Pts	PIM
2004–05	Ässät	FIN U18	10	4	0	4	18	—	—	—	—	—
2004–05	Ässät	FIN U20	33	5	7	12	12	—	—	—	—	—
2005–06	Ässät	FIN U18	1	1	0	1	0	8	3	9	12	2
2005–06	Ässät	FIN U20	37	9	16	25	12	—	—	—	—	—
2006–07	Ässät	FIN U20	27	7	17	24	8	—	—	—	—	—
2006–07	Ässät	SM-l	43	1	3	4	4	—	—	—	—	—
2007–08	Ässät	FIN U20	18	2	11	13	6	12	3	4	7	4
2007–08	Ässät	SM-l	22	1	1	2	0	—	—	—	—	—
2007–08	Jukurit	Mestis	8	1	5	6	2	—	—	—	—	—
2008–09	HPK	SM-l	54	7	15	22	20	6	1	0	1	2
2009–10	HPK	SM-l	55	7	19	26	12	17	0	1	1	0
2010–11	Kärpät	SM-l	60	2	5	7	10	3	1	1	2	0
2011–12	Kärpät	SM-l	60	9	14	23	43	1	0	0	0	0
2012–13	Kärpät	SM-l	60	7	6	13	14	3	1	0	1	0
2013–14	Kärpät	Liiga	51	17	14	31	6	16	0	4	4	12
2014–15	Kärpät	Liiga	59	11	21	32	18	19	10	14	24	2
2015–16	Boston Bruins	NHL	44	2	3	5	4	—	—	—	—	—
2015–16	Providence Bruins	AHL	11	1	4	5	2	—	—	—	—	—
2016–17	Sibir Novosibirsk	KHL	60	11	12	23	22	—	—	—	—	—
2017–18	Salavat Yulaev Ufa	KHL	55	16	21	37	12	14	4	5	9	4
2018–19	Salavat Yulaev Ufa	KHL	59	17	16	33	41	17	10	4	14	12
2019–20	SKA Saint Petersburg	KHL	56	6	7	13	8	4	2	1	3	2
2020–21	SKA Saint Petersburg	KHL	54	15	14	29	10	16	3	3	6	4
2021–22	SKA Saint Petersburg	KHL	40	13	14	27	47	4	1	0	1	0
2022–23	Kärpät	Liiga	58	14	18	32	12	3	1	1	2	0
Liiga totals			522	76	116	192	139	68	14	21	35	16
NHL totals			44	2	3	5	4	—	—	—	—	—
KHL totals			324	78	84	162	140	55	20	13	33	22

=== International ===
Year	Team	Event	Result	GP	G	A	Pts	PIM
2005	Finland	U18	7th	6	0	0	0	2
2006	Finland	U18	2nd place, silver medalist(s)	6	1	1	2	2
2008	Finland	WJC	6th	6	2	1	3	4
2015	Finland	WC	6th	8	3	6	9	0
2017	Finland	WC	4th	10	2	1	3	2
2018	Finland	OG	6th	5	2	2	4	2
Junior totals				18	3	2	5	8
Senior totals				23	7	9	16	4
