= Zetov =

Zetov, feminine: Zetova is a surname whose spelling in English may be of two origins: Bulgarian-language surname Зетов/Зетова and Czech-language Zeťov/Zeťová. Both are of the same derivation: Зет in Bulgarian and Zeť in Czech mean son-in-law.

Notable people with the surname include:

- Antonina Zetova, Bulgarian volleyball player
- Helena Zeťová, Czech singer
- Ivan Zetov, Bulgarian basketball player
- Zlatko Zetov, former head coach of KK Strumica

== See also ==
- Zaťovič
