= Ivan Usenko =

Belarusian ice hockey player

- Born: February 12, 1983 (age 42); Gorky, Soviet Union
- Height: 6 ft 0 in (183 cm)
- Weight: 203 lb (92 kg; 14 st 7 lb)
- Position: Defence
- Shoots: Right
- Extraleague B team Former teams: Lokomotiv Orsha; HC Dinamo Minsk
- National team: Belarus
- NHL draft: Undrafted
- Playing career: 2002–present

Ivan Usenko (born February 12, 1983) is a Belarusian ice hockey defenceman. He is currently playing with the Lokomotiv Orsha of the Belarusian Extraleague B.

== International ==
Usenko was named to the Belarus men's national ice hockey team for competition at the 2014 IIHF World Championship.
