= Jakub Nakládal =

Czech ice hockey player (born 1987)

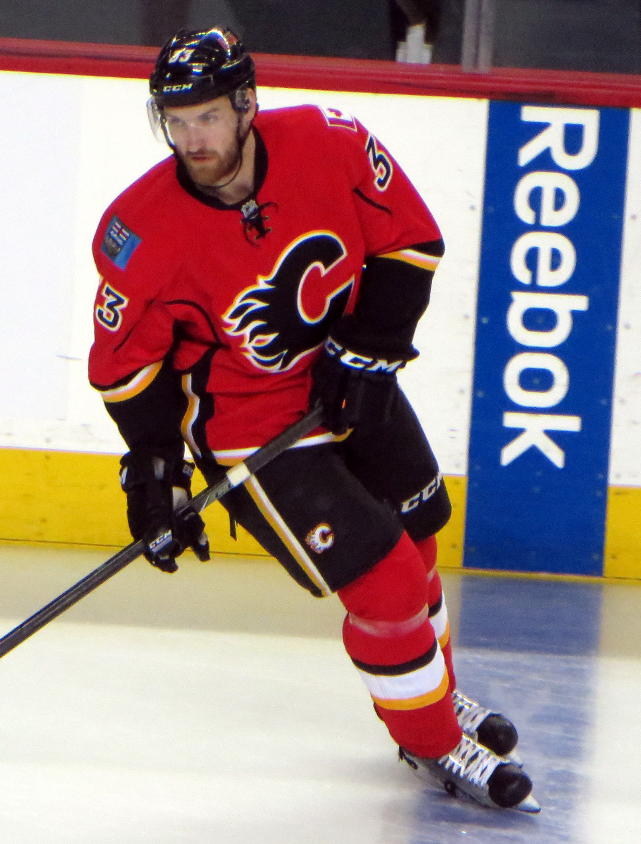
- Born: 30 December 1987 (age 38) Hradec Králové, Czechoslovakia
- Height: 6 ft 2 in (188 cm)
- Weight: 212 lb (96 kg; 15 st 2 lb)
- Position: Defence
- Shot: Right
- Played for: Salavat Yulaev Ufa; HC Spartak Moscow; HC Lev Praha; HC TPS; Calgary Flames; Carolina Hurricanes; Lokomotiv Yaroslavl; HC Dynamo Pardubice
- National team: Czech Republic
- NHL draft: Undrafted
- Playing career: 2007–2022

Jakub Nakládal (born 30 December 1987) is a Czech former professional ice hockey defenseman who last played for HC Dynamo Pardubice of the Czech Extraliga (ELH).

== Playing career ==
Undrafted, Nakládal played in his native Czech Republic making his Czech Extraliga debut in the 2006–07 season with HC Pardubice. During his sixth season with Pardubice, having established himself as a defensive defenseman, Nakládal transferred mid-season to the Kontinental Hockey League with Salavat Yulaev Ufa in 2011–12.

After stints with HC Spartak Moscow and HC Lev Praha, Nakládal opted to sign in the Finnish Liiga with TPS Turku for the 2014–15 season. Contributing with 15 points in 50 games, Nakládal garnered the attention of NHL scouts with his defensively sound game.

On 19 May 2015, Jakub signed an NHL contract in agreeing to a one-year two-way contract with the Calgary Flames. He was assigned to AHL affiliate, the Stockton Heat, to begin his North American career in the 2015–16. On 9 February 2016, after he was recalled to Calgary he played his first NHL game. On 1 March 2016, he recorded his first NHL goal in a game against the Boston Bruins.

On 9 October 2016, after going un-signed over the summer, Nakládal belatedly signed a one-year deal to add a veteran presence on the blueline with the Carolina Hurricanes. To begin the 2016–17 season, Nakládal was primarily a healthy scratch and appeared in just 3 games with the Hurricanes, before he was placed on waivers and assigned to the American Hockey League. After refusing to report to affiliate, the Charlotte Checkers, Nakládal's contract with Carolina was terminated on 14 November 2016. On 2 December 2016, Nakládal opted to return to the KHL for the remainder of the season, signing a one-year deal with Lokomotiv Yaroslavl.

After four seasons in the KHL with Lokomotiv, Nakládal opted to return to the Czech Republic, and rejoin his original club, HC Dynamo Pardubice, on a three-year contract on 17 June 2020. In January 2022 his contract with Dynamo was mutually terminated. Later that year he announced his retirement, attributing this decision to his lack of passion for hockey in spite of multiple offers from other Extraliga clubs.

== International play ==
Medal record

Representing Czech Republic

World Championships
Bronze medal – third place	2012 Finland	

Nakladal participated at the 2011 IIHF World Championship, 2012 IIHF World Championship (where he won a bronze medal), and 2013 IIHF World Championship as a member of the Czech Republic men's national ice hockey team. He participated in the 2015 IIHF World Championship in his home country and led all Czech defenseman with 5 assists in 10 games in a fourth-place finish.

== Career statistics ==
=== Regular season and playoffs ===
			Regular season					Playoffs
Season	Team	League	GP	G	A	Pts	PIM	GP	G	A	Pts	PIM
2002–03	HC ČSOB Pojišťovna Pardubice	CZE U18	9	0	0	0	0	—	—	—	—	—
2003–04	HC Moeller Pardubice	CZE U18	45	2	6	8	26	—	—	—	—	—
2004–05	HC Moeller Pardubice	CZE U20	40	4	13	17	50	2	0	0	0	34
2005–06	HC Moeller Pardubice	CZE U20	45	2	7	9	89	—	—	—	—	—
2006–07	HC Moeller Pardubice	CZE U20	32	7	15	22	104	—	—	—	—	—
2006–07	HC Moeller Pardubice	ELH	1	0	0	0	0	—	—	—	—	—
2006–07	HC Berounští Medvědi	CZE.2	12	0	5	5	20	—	—	—	—	—
2007–08	HC Moeller Pardubice	ELH	14	1	2	3	20	—	—	—	—	—
2007–08	HC Vrchlabí	CZE.2	11	0	1	1	6	—	—	—	—	—
2008–09	HC Moeller Pardubice	ELH	44	2	7	9	38	—	—	—	—	—
2008–09	HC Chrudim	CZE.2	3	0	0	0	4	1	0	0	0	2
2009–10	HC Eaton Pardubice	ELH	45	6	9	15	58	13	1	3	4	26
2010–11	HC Eaton Pardubice	ELH	45	5	6	11	32	9	1	2	3	18
2011–12	HC ČSOB Pojišťovna Pardubice	ELH	12	2	3	5	4	—	—	—	—	—
2011–12	Salavat Yulaev Ufa	KHL	32	1	7	8	30	6	1	0	1	20
2012–13	HC Spartak Moscow	KHL	37	0	4	4	26	—	—	—	—	—
2012–13	HC Lev Praha	KHL	14	1	4	5	8	4	0	0	0	2
2013–14	HC Lev Praha	KHL	34	0	3	3	26	21	0	3	3	14
2014–15	TPS	Liiga	50	3	12	15	63	—	—	—	—	—
2015–16	Stockton Heat	AHL	35	2	12	14	30	—	—	—	—	—
2015–16	Calgary Flames	NHL	27	2	3	5	6	—	—	—	—	—
2016–17	Carolina Hurricanes	NHL	3	0	0	0	0	—	—	—	—	—
2016–17	Lokomotiv Yaroslavl	KHL	24	3	6	9	21	15	6	5	11	21
2017–18	Lokomotiv Yaroslavl	KHL	54	9	17	26	48	9	1	1	2	16
2018–19	Lokomotiv Yaroslavl	KHL	53	9	14	23	35	8	1	3	4	4
2019–20	Lokomotiv Yaroslavl	KHL	48	7	12	19	33	6	0	1	1	2
2020–21	HC Dynamo Pardubice	ELH	51	4	19	23	52	8	1	1	2	6
2021–22	HC Dynamo Pardubice	ELH	35	3	8	11	18	—	—	—	—	—
ELH totals			247	23	54	77	222	30	3	6	9	50
KHL totals			296	30	67	97	227	69	9	13	22	79
NHL totals			30	2	3	5	6	—	—	—	—	—

=== International ===
Year	Team	Event	Result	GP	G	A	Pts	PIM
2012	Czech Republic	WC	3rd place, bronze medalist(s)	10	0	4	4	6
2013	Czech Republic	WC	7th	8	0	1	1	10
2015	Czech Republic	WC	4th	10	0	5	5	4
2016	Czech Republic	WCH	6th	3	0	0	0	4
2018	Czech Republic	OG	4th	6	0	2	2	6
Senior totals				37	0	12	12	30
