= Ondřej Němec =

Czech ice hockey player (born 1984)

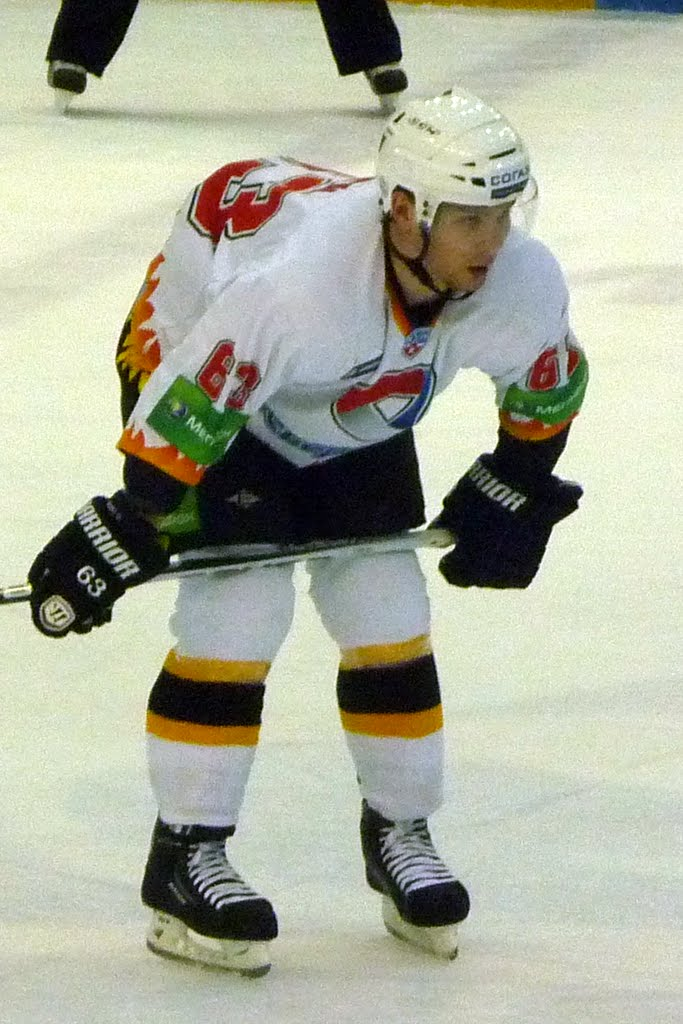
- Born: 18 April 1984 (age 42) Třebíč, Czechoslovakia
- Height: 6 ft 0 in (183 cm)
- Weight: 203 lb (92 kg; 14 st 7 lb)
- Position: Defence
- Shoots: Right
- KHL team Former teams: Severstal Cherepovets; HC Vsetín; WBS Penguins; HC Karlovy Vary; HC Lev Praha; Atlant Moscow Oblast; CSKA Moscow
- National team: Czech Republic
- NHL draft: 35th overall, 2002; Pittsburgh Penguins
Medal record
Representing Czech Republic
World Championships
Gold medal – first place	2010 Germany	Team
Bronze medal – third place	2011 Slovakia	Team
Bronze medal – third place	2012 Finland	Team

Ondřej Němec (born 18 April 1984) is a Czech professional ice hockey defenceman who currently plays for Severstal Cherepovets of the Kontinental Hockey League (KHL). He was selected by the Pittsburgh Penguins in the 2nd round (35th overall) of the 2002 NHL entry draft.

On 2 July 2014, Němec left HC Lev Praha, after it declared bankruptcy and folded, as a free agent to sign with fellow KHL club, Atlant Moscow Oblast.

== Career statistics ==
=== Regular season and playoffs ===
			Regular season					Playoffs
Season	Team	League	GP	G	A	Pts	PIM	GP	G	A	Pts	PIM
1999–2000	HC Slovnaft Vsetín	CZE U18	45	5	18	23	38	2	1	0	1	24
1999–2000	HC Slovnaft Vsetín	CZE U20	2	0	2	2	0	3	0	0	0	4
2000–01	HC Slovnaft Vsetín	CZE U18	8	3	7	10	20	—	—	—	—	—
2000–01	HC Slovnaft Vsetín	CZE U20	33	9	8	17	61	9	1	4	5	16
2001–02	HC Vsetín	CZE U20	8	4	7	11	47	—	—	—	—	—
2001–02	HC Vsetín	ELH	44	5	3	8	79	—	—	—	—	—
2001–02	SK Horácká Slavia Třebíč	CZE.2	1	1	0	1	2	8	0	0	0	16
2002–03	HC Vsetín	ELH	39	2	7	9	36	4	0	0	0	2
2002–03	SK Horácká Slavia Třebíč	CZE.2	2	0	0	0	6	—	—	—	—	—
2003–04	Vsetínská hokejová	ELH	42	2	4	6	30	—	—	—	—	—
2003–04	SK Horácká Slavia Třebíč	CZE.2	2	0	0	0	2	—	—	—	—	—
2003–04	Wilkes–Barre/Scranton Penguins	AHL	7	1	2	3	2	7	0	1	1	6
2004–05	Vsetínská hokejová	ELH	48	6	9	15	81	—	—	—	—	—
2004–05	SK Horácká Slavia Třebíč	CZE.2	4	0	2	2	4	—	—	—	—	—
2005–06	HC Energie Karlovy Vary	ELH	45	5	5	10	41	—	—	—	—	—
2006–07	HC Energie Karlovy Vary	ELH	52	2	13	15	52	3	0	1	1	6
2007–08	HC Energie Karlovy Vary	ELH	52	4	5	9	30	19	3	4	7	22
2008–09	HC Energie Karlovy Vary	ELH	52	4	11	15	46	15	6	5	11	18
2009–10	HC Energie Karlovy Vary	ELH	52	7	19	26	70	—	—	—	—	—
2010–11	Severstal Cherepovets	KHL	52	12	5	17	46	6	0	2	2	2
2011–12	Severstal Cherepovets	KHL	44	2	10	12	30	6	1	1	2	8
2012–13	HC Lev Praha	KHL	52	6	16	22	46	4	0	0	0	4
2013–14	HC Lev Praha	KHL	51	3	16	19	55	22	3	7	10	36
2014–15	Atlant Moscow Oblast	KHL	37	3	10	13	26	—	—	—	—	—
2014–15	CSKA Moscow	KHL	19	2	4	6	12	9	0	1	1	4
2015–16	Severstal Cherepovets	KHL	55	8	9	17	30	—	—	—	—	—
2016–17	HC Kometa Brno	ELH	50	7	17	24	28	12	3	3	6	0
2017–18	HC Kometa Brno	ELH	42	5	5	10	12	14	0	4	4	12
2018–19	HC Kometa Brno	ELH	48	4	25	29	16	10	1	4	5	12
2019–20	HC Kometa Brno	ELH	50	4	18	22	26	—	—	—	—	—
2020–21	HC Kometa Brno	ELH	27	0	6	6	10	—	—	—	—	—
2020–21	HC Sparta Praha	ELH	12	0	1	1	2	5	0	0	0	0
2021–22	PSG Berani Zlín	ELH	47	3	5	8	46	—	—	—	—	—
ELH totals			702	60	153	213	605	82	13	21	34	72
KHL totals			310	36	70	106	245	47	4	11	15	54

=== International ===
Year	Team	Event	GP	G	A	Pts	PIM
2001	Czech Republic	U17
2001	Czech Republic	U18
2002	Czech Republic	WJC18	8	1	6	7	45
2004	Czech Republic	WJC	7	2	2	4	8
2009	Czech Republic	WC	7	0	1	1	2
2010	Czech Republic	WC	6	0	1	1	0
2011	Czech Republic	WC	6	0	0	0	0
2012	Czech Republic	WC	9	0	2	2	4
2014	Czech Republic	WC	10	2	5	7	2
2015	Czech Republic	WC	10	3	3	6	4
2018	Czech Republic	OG	6	0	0	0	2
Junior totals			15	3	8	11	53
Senior totals			54	5	12	17	14
