= René Swette =

Austrian ice hockey player

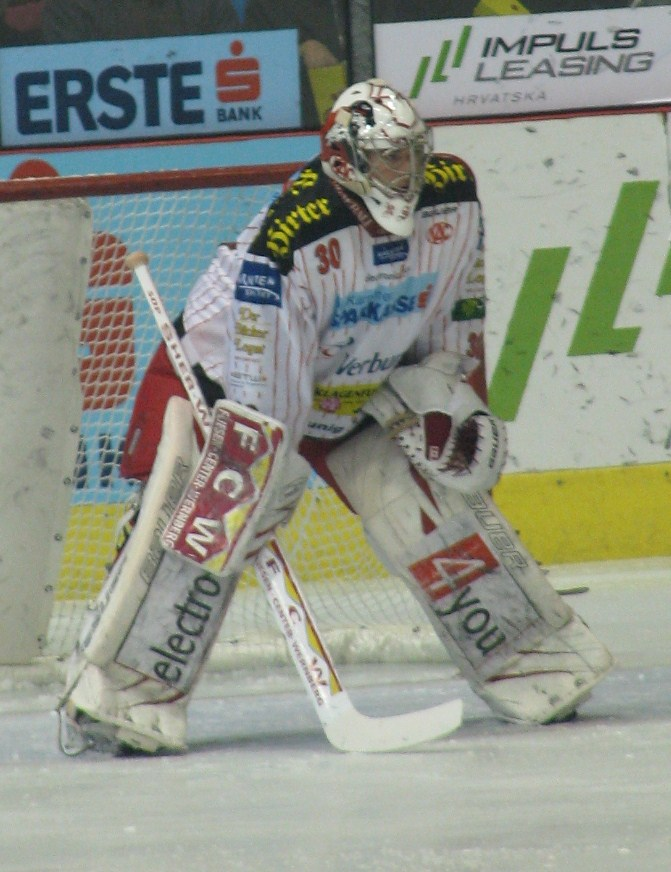
- Born: August 21, 1988 (age 37) Lustenau, Austria
- Height: 6 ft 0 in (183 cm)
- Weight: 181 lb (82 kg; 12 st 13 lb)
- Position: Goaltender
- Catches: Left
- ICEHL team Former teams: HC TWK Innsbruck; EC KAC; EHC Black Wings Linz; Dresdner Eislöwen; EC VSV
- National team: Austria
- Playing career: 2008–present

René Swette (born August 21, 1988) is an Austrian professional ice hockey goaltender who is currently playing for HC TWK Innsbruck of the ICE Hockey League (ICEHL). He participated at the 2011 IIHF World Championship as a member of the Austria men's national ice hockey team.
