= Martin Zaťovič =

Czech ice hockey player

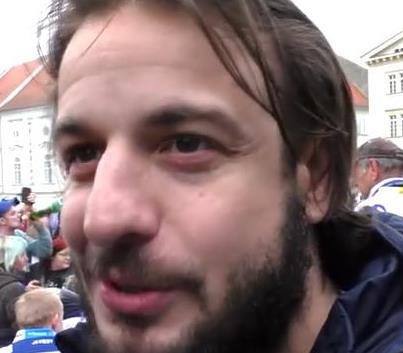
- Born: 25 January 1985 (age 41) Přerov, Czechoslovakia
- Height: 5 ft 11 in (180 cm)
- Weight: 201 lb (91 kg; 14 st 5 lb)
- Position: Forward
- Shoots: Left
- ELH team Former teams: HC Kometa Brno; HC Karlovy Vary; HC Lada Togliatti
- National team: Czech Republic
- Playing career: 2005–present

Martin Zaťovič (born 25 January 1985) is a Czech professional ice hockey player currently playing with HC Kometa Brno in the Czech Extraliga (ELH). He previously played the majority of his career with HC Karlovy Vary in the Czech Extraliga during the 2010–11 Czech Extraliga season and enjoyed a two-season tenure in the Kontinental Hockey League with HC Lada Togliatti.
