= 2015 IIHF World Championship Group A =

Group A was one of two groups of the 2015 IIHF World Championship. The four best placed teams advanced to the playoff round, while the last placed team was relegated to Division I in 2016.

== Standings ==
Pos	Team	Pld	W	OTW	OTL	L	GF	GA	GD	Pts	Qualification or relegation
1	Canada	7	7	0	0	0	49	14	+35	21	Advance to the playoff round
2	Sweden	7	4	2	0	1	34	19	+15	16	Advance to the playoff round
3	Czech Republic (H)	7	4	1	1	1	27	18	+9	15	Advance to the playoff round
4	Switzerland	7	2	0	4	1	12	18	−6	10	Advance to the playoff round
5	Germany	7	2	0	1	4	11	24	−13	7	
6	France	7	1	1	0	5	13	20	−7	5 (Note: Head to head record; France 5p, Latvia 3p and Austria 1p. Austria relegated on head-to-head points.)	
7	Latvia	7	0	2	1	4	11	25	−14	5	
8	Austria	7	0	2	1	4	10	29	−19	5	Relegation to Division I A

Updated to match(es) played on 12 May 2015. Source: Standings
Rules for classification: 1) points; 2) head-to-head points; 3) head-to-head goal difference; 4) head-to-head number of goals scored; 5) result against closest best-ranked team outside tied teams; 6) result against second-best ranked team outside tied teams; 7) seeding before tournament.
(H) Host
Notes:

All times are local (UTC+2).

== 1 May ==
=== Canada vs Latvia ===
1 May 2015; 16:15	Canada	6–1 (3–0, 2–0, 1–1)	Latvia	O2 Arena, Prague; Attendance: 16,013

Game reference

Mike Smith
Goalies
Edgars Masaļskis
Ervīns Muštukovs
Referees:
(Czech Republic) Pavel Hodek
(Sweden) Marcus Vinnerborg
Linesmen:
(Norway) Jon Killian
(Czech Republic) Miroslav Lhotský

MacKinnon (Spezza, Savard) – 09:57	1–0
Spezza (Hamhuis, MacKinnon) – 13:04	2–0
Duchene (Hall, Barrie) – 14:11	3–0
Toffoli (Hamhuis, Burns) – 22:20	4–0
Spezza (MacKinnon, Crosby) – 23:04	5–0
	5–1	52:06 – Daugaviņš (Dārziņš, Džeriņš)
Crosby (PS) – 59:37	6–1

2 min
Penalties
6 min
42
Shots
17

=== Czech Republic vs Sweden ===
1 May 2015; 20:15	Czech Republic	5–6 GWS (1–2, 0–1, 4–2) (OT 0–0) (SO: 0–1)	Sweden	O2 Arena, Prague; Attendance: 17,383

Game reference

Alexander Salák
Goalies
Jhonas Enroth
Referees:
(Germany) Daniel Piechaczek
(Finland) Aleksi Rantala
Linesmen:
(Russia) Gleb Lazarev
(Finland) Sakari Suominen

	0–1	03:23 – Lundqvist (Sjögren, Josefson)
	0–2	07:30 – Kronwall (Ekholm, Lander) (PP)
Jágr (Nakládal, Voráček) (PP) – 13:28	1–2
	1–3	34:34 – Rask (Lindholm, Hjalmarsson)
Hertl (Němec, Klepiš) (PP) – 42:52	2–3
	2–4	44:08 – Lindström (Möller)
Simon (Hejda) – 51:34	3–4
Červenka (Voráček, Čáslava) – 52:31	4–4
Zaťovič (Novotný, Simon) – 56:53	5–4
	5–5	59:07 – Sjögren (Lindström, Klingberg) (PP, EA)

Klepiš (miss)
Voráček
Sobotka (miss)
Shootout
Lindholm
(miss) Josefson
Ekman-Larsson
8 min
Penalties
10 min
28
Shots
25

== 2 May ==
=== Switzerland vs Austria ===
2 May 2015; 12:15	Switzerland	3–4 GWS (1–0, 1–1, 1–2) (OT 0–0) (SO: 0–1)	Austria	O2 Arena, Prague; Attendance: 13,953

Game reference

Reto Berra
Goalies
Bernhard Starkbaum
Referees:
(Slovakia) Jozef Kubuš
(Germany) Daniel Piechaczek
Linesmen:
(Sweden) Henrik Pihlblad
(Slovakia) Peter Šefčík

Du Bois (Fiala, Almond) – 01:14	1–0
	1–1	22:12 – T. Raffl (Pallestrang)
Ambühl (Josi) (SH) – 25:54	2–1
	2–2	43:33 – Lebler (Herburger)
Bieber (Almond, Grossmann) – 51:01	3–2
	3–3	59:10 – M. Raffl (T. Raffl, Schumnig) (EA)

Suri (miss)
Brunner (miss)
Josi (miss)
Shootout
(miss) M. Raffl
Komarek
4 min
Penalties
8 min
37
Shots
25

=== France vs Germany ===
2 May 2015; 16:15	France	1–2 (0–1, 0–0, 1–1)	Germany	O2 Arena, Prague; Attendance: 14,903

Game reference

Cristobal Huet
Goalies
Dennis Endras
Referees:
(Russia) Vyacheslav Bulanov
(Finland) Jyri Rönn
Linesmen:
(Switzerland) Nicolas Fluri
(Germany) André Schrader

	0–1	12:10 – Wolf (Rieder, Hager)
Fleury (S. Da Costa) – 50:44	1–1
	1–2	59:00 – Reimer (Hager) (PP)

10 min
Penalties
14 min
25
Shots
26

=== Latvia vs Czech Republic ===
2 May 2015; 20:15	Latvia	2–4 (1–0, 1–3, 0–1)	Czech Republic	O2 Arena, Prague; Attendance: 17,383

Game reference

Edgars Masaļskis
Goalies
Alexander Salák
Ondřej Pavelec
Referees:
(Russia) Konstantin Olenin
(Switzerland) Daniel Stricker
Linesmen:
(Norway) Jon Killian
(Finland) Masi Puolakka

Daugaviņš (Dārziņš, Galviņš) (PP) – 13:13	1–0
	1–1	22:01 – Jordán (Červenka, Novotný)
Rēdlihs (Sprukts) (PP) – 23:18	2–1
	2–2	24:25 – Kovář (Nakládal, Erat) (PP)
	2–3	32:44 – Jágr (Erat, Kovář) (PP)
	2–4	45:29 – Voráček (Kovář, Nakládal) (PP)

35 min
Penalties
8 min
10
Shots
35

== 3 May ==
=== Austria vs Sweden ===
3 May 2015; 12:15	Austria	1–6 (0–3, 0–3, 1–0)	Sweden	O2 Arena, Prague; Attendance: 14,051

Game reference

Rene Swette
Bernhard Starkbaum
Goalies
Anders Nilsson
Referees:
(Russia) Roman Gofman
(Switzerland) Daniel Stricker
Linesmen:
(Czech Republic) Miroslav Lhotský
(Finland) Sakari Suominen

	0–1	13:38 – Forsberg
	0–2	18:37 – Klefbom (Sjögren, Josefson)
	0–3	19:18 – Lander (Eriksson, Forsberg)
	0–4	28:22 – Forsberg (Eriksson, Ekman-Larsson)
	0–5	29:13 – Lindholm
	0–6	31:14 – Forsberg (Lander, Ekman-Larsson)
Heinrich (Komarek, Latusa) – 53:17	1–6

12 min
Penalties
18 min
17
Shots
41

=== Canada vs Germany ===
3 May 2015; 16:15	Canada	10–0 (4–0, 5–0, 1–0)	Germany	O2 Arena, Prague; Attendance: 15,046

Game reference

Martin Jones
Goalies
Dennis Endras
Danny aus den Birken
Referees:
(Slovakia) Jozef Kubuš
(Russia) Konstantin Olenin
Linesmen:
(United States) Fraser McIntyre
(Slovakia) Peter Šefčík

Crosby (O'Reilly) – 08:02	1–0
Hall (Eberle, Duchene) – 08:25	2–0
Eakin (O'Reilly) – 16:58	3–0
Eakin (Toffoli) – 19:49	4–0
Hall (Duchene, Eberle) – 22:10	5–0
Ekblad (Giroux, Wiercioch) – 24:29	6–0
Giroux (Ennis, Savard) – 27:34	7–0
Ennis (Giroux, Hamhuis) – 35:16	8–0
Hall (Duchene, Muzzin) – 39:37	9–0
Duchene (PS) – 42:03	10–0

6 min
Penalties
2 min
34
Shots
17

=== France vs Switzerland ===
3 May 2015; 20:15	France	1–3 (0–1, 0–1, 1–1)	Switzerland	O2 Arena, Prague; Attendance: 8,780

Game reference

Cristobal Huet
Goalies
Leonardo Genoni
Referees:
(Czech Republic) Pavel Hodek
(Finland) Aleksi Rantala
Linesmen:
(Sweden) Henrik Pihlblad
(Finland) Masi Puolakka

	0–1	15:36 – Hollenstein (Brunner, Josi) (PP)
	0–2	21:24 – Josi (Fiala, Blum)
Raux – 48:31	1–2
	1–3	59:06 – Suri (Brunner) (ENG)

63 min
Penalties
12 min
20
Shots
35

== 4 May ==
=== Latvia vs Sweden ===
4 May 2015; 16:15	Latvia	1–8 (0–1, 1–3, 0–4)	Sweden	O2 Arena, Prague; Attendance: 15,315

Game reference

Edgars Masaļskis
Goalies
Jhonas Enroth
Referees:
(Czech Republic) Pavel Hodek
(Finland) Aleksi Rantala
Linesmen:
(Czech Republic) Miroslav Lhotský
(Norway) Jon Killian

	0–1	17:37 – Eriksson (PP)
	0–2	30:05 – Eriksson (Ekholm, Kronwall) (PP)
Dārziņš (Daugaviņš, Galviņš) (PP) – 32:53	1–2
	1–3	33:03 – Forsberg (PS)
	1–4	39:46 – Eriksson (Ahnelöv)
	1–5	44:43 – Möller (Ekman-Larsson, Klingberg) (PP)
	1–6	49:32 – Josefson (Lundqvist)
	1–7	57:04 – Lundqvist (Hjalmarsson, Ekman-Larsson)
	1–8	59:51 – Rask (Ericsson, Lindholm)

10 min
Penalties
10 min
20
Shots
36

=== Canada vs Czech Republic ===
4 May 2015; 20:15	Canada	6–3 (2–1, 1–1, 3–1)	Czech Republic	O2 Arena, Prague; Attendance: 17,383

Game reference

Mike Smith
Goalies
Ondřej Pavelec
Referees:
(Russia) Vyacheslav Bulanov
(Finland) Jyri Rönn
Linesmen:
(Russia) Gleb Lazarev
(Finland) Sakari Suominen

Eberle (Ekblad, Duchene) – 04:18	1–0
Hall (Muzzin, Eberle) – 19:02	2–0
	2–1	19:22 – Erat (Kovář, Jágr)
	2–2	35:45 – Zaťovič (Simon, Kolář)
Couturier (Toffoli) – 37:40	3–2
Seguin (Hall, Barrie) (PP) – 42:02	4–2
Crosby (Giroux) (PP) – 50:07	5–2
	5–3	57:36 – Sobotka (Voráček)
Toffoli (O'Reilly, MacKinnon) (ENG) – 58:31	6–3

10 min
Penalties
14 min
38
Shots
25

== 5 May ==
=== Switzerland vs Germany ===
5 May 2015; 16:15	Switzerland	1–0 (0–0, 0–0, 1–0)	Germany	O2 Arena, Prague; Attendance: 10,253

Game reference
Leonardo Genoni	Goalies	Timo Pielmeier	Referees: (Sweden) Mikael Nord (Russia) Vyacheslav Bulanov; Linesmen: (Finland) Masi Puolakka (Slovakia) Peter Šefčík
Hollenstein (Brunner, Romy) – 52:16 / 1–0			Referees: (Sweden) Mikael Nord (Russia) Vyacheslav Bulanov; Linesmen: (Finland) Masi Puolakka (Slovakia) Peter Šefčík
6 min	Penalties	12 min	Referees: (Sweden) Mikael Nord (Russia) Vyacheslav Bulanov; Linesmen: (Finland) Masi Puolakka (Slovakia) Peter Šefčík
18	Shots	18	Referees: (Sweden) Mikael Nord (Russia) Vyacheslav Bulanov; Linesmen: (Finland) Masi Puolakka (Slovakia) Peter Šefčík

=== Austria vs France ===
5 May 2015; 20:15	Austria	0–2 (0–0, 0–0, 0–2)	France	O2 Arena, Prague; Attendance: 5,857

Game reference
Bernhard Starkbaum	Goalies	Cristobal Huet	Referees: (Switzerland) Tobias Wehrli (Czech Republic) Vladimír Šindler; Linesmen: (Sweden) Henrik Pihlblad (United States) Fraser McIntyre
0–1 / 46:13 – Fleury (S. Da Costa, Auvitu) (PP); 0–2 / 59:02 – Meunier (Y. Treille, Hecquefeuille) (ENG)			Referees: (Switzerland) Tobias Wehrli (Czech Republic) Vladimír Šindler; Linesmen: (Sweden) Henrik Pihlblad (United States) Fraser McIntyre
6 min	Penalties	2 min	Referees: (Switzerland) Tobias Wehrli (Czech Republic) Vladimír Šindler; Linesmen: (Sweden) Henrik Pihlblad (United States) Fraser McIntyre
34	Shots	17	Referees: (Switzerland) Tobias Wehrli (Czech Republic) Vladimír Šindler; Linesmen: (Sweden) Henrik Pihlblad (United States) Fraser McIntyre

== 6 May ==
=== Switzerland vs Latvia ===
6 May 2015; 16:15	Switzerland	1–2 OT (0–0, 0–1, 1–0) (OT 0–1)	Latvia	O2 Arena, Prague; Attendance: 10,856

Game reference

Reto Berra
Goalies
Edgars Masaļskis
Referees:
(Belarus) Maxim Sidorenko
(Czech Republic) Vladimír Šindler
Linesmen:
(Russia) Gleb Lazarev
(Norway) Jon Killian

	0–1	24:19 – Džeriņš (Dārziņš, Rēdlihs)
Bieber – 58:09	1–1
	1–2	62:19 – Daugaviņš (Dārziņš)

6 min
Penalties
10 min
36
Shots
21

=== Sweden vs Canada ===
6 May 2015; 20:15	Sweden	4–6 (3–0, 1–3, 0–3)	Canada	O2 Arena, Prague; Attendance: 16,695

Game reference

Anders Nilsson
Goalies
Mike Smith
Referees:
(Switzerland) Tobias Wehrli
(Finland) Jyri Rönn
Linesmen:
(Finland) Masi Puolakka
(Czech Republic) Miroslav Lhotský

Lander (Eriksson, Granberg) – 05:06	1–0
Rask (Klefbom, Lindholm) – 17:21	2–0
Forsberg (Eriksson, Klingberg) – 17:49	3–0
	3–1	26:43 – Ekblad (Burns, O'Reilly)
	3–2	31:27 – Hall (PS)
	3–3	34:23 – Couturier (Ekblad)
Möller (Sjögren, Ekman-Larsson) – 35:19	4–3
	4–4	50:24 – Wiercioch (Eberle, Crosby)
	4–5	53:31 – Ennis (Hall, Spezza) (PP)
	4–6	58:10 – Seguin (O'Reilly) (ENG)

4 min
Penalties
4 min
32
Shots
39

== 7 May ==
=== Czech Republic vs France ===
7 May 2015; 16:15	Czech Republic	5–1 (0–0, 2–1, 3–0)	France	O2 Arena, Prague; Attendance: 17,110

Game reference

Ondřej Pavelec
Goalies
Florian Hardy
Referees:
(Sweden) Mikael Nord
(Finland) Aleksi Rantala
Linesmen:
(Sweden) Henrik Pihlblad
(Finland) Sakari Suominen

Němec (Novotný) – 21:10	1–0
Sobotka (Krejčík) – 26:58	2–0
	2–1	28:41 – Hecquefeuille (Lampérier, Guttig)
Jágr (Kovář, Simon) – 44:25	3–1
Němec (Hertl, Voráček) – 48:28	4–1
Červenka (Němec, Krejčík) (PP) – 54:49	5–1

4 min
Penalties
10 min
46
Shots
20

=== Sweden vs Germany ===
7 May 2015; 20:15	Sweden	4–3 (2–1, 0–1, 2–1)	Germany	O2 Arena, Prague; Attendance: 16,137

Game reference

Jhonas Enroth
Goalies
Timo Pielmeier
Referees:
(Czech Republic) Pavel Hodek
(Belarus) Maxim Sidorenko
Linesmen:
(United States) Fraser McIntyre
(Slovakia) Peter Šefčík

Möller (Lindström, Sjögren) – 11:19	1–0
Lindström (Möller]) – 12:44	2–0
	2–1	15:48 – Kink (Rieder, Daschner) (PP)
	2–2	29:30 – Krämmer
Klingberg (Kronwall, Möller) – 42:56	3–2
Möller (Ekman-Larsson, Lindström) – 48:40	4–2
	4–3	54:39 – Plachta (Hospelt, Seidenberg)

6 min
Penalties
29 min
35
Shots
27

== 8 May ==
=== Czech Republic vs Austria ===
8 May 2015; 16:15	Czech Republic	4–0 (0–0, 3–0, 1–0)	Austria	O2 Arena, Prague; Attendance: 17,383

Game reference

Ondřej Pavelec
Goalies
Bernhard Starkbaum
Rene Swette
Referees:
(Russia) Vyacheslav Bulanov
(Finland) Jyri Rönn
Linesmen:
(Russia) Gleb Lazarev
(United States) Fraser McIntyre

Němec (Simon) – 31:09	1–0
Zaťovič (Hejda, Němec) – 38:04	2–0
Sobotka (Červenka, Krejčík) – 39:08	3–0
Voráček (Jordán, Hertl) – 40:07	4–0

4 min
Penalties
10 min
42
Shots
12

=== Germany vs Latvia ===
8 May 2015; 20:15	Germany	2–1 (0–1, 0–0, 2–0)	Latvia	O2 Arena, Prague; Attendance: 15,494

Game reference

Dennis Endras
Goalies
Edgars Masaļskis
Referees:
(Sweden) Mikael Nord
(Switzerland) Tobias Wehrli
Linesmen:
(Finland) Masi Puolakka
(Norway) Jon Killian

	0–1	11:05 – Dārziņš (Daugaviņš) (PP)
Wolf (Reimer, Krueger) (PP) – 46:46	1–1
Plachta – 57:35	2–1

10 min
Penalties
27 min
24
Shots
16

== 9 May ==
=== France vs Canada ===
9 May 2015; 12:15	France	3–4 (1–2, 0–1, 2–1)	Canada	O2 Arena, Prague; Attendance: 15,300

Game reference

Ronan Quemener
Goalies
Martin Jones
Referees:
(Switzerland) Tobias Wehrli
(Czech Republic) Vladimír Šindler
Linesmen:
(Sweden) Henrik Pihlblad
(Slovakia) Peter Šefčík

	0–1	11:26 – Seguin (Spezza, Barrie) (PP)
	0–2	12:32 – Eberle (MacKinnon, Duchene)
Desrosiers (Meunier, Auvitu) – 16:31	1–2
	1–3	37:02 – Seguin (Spezza) (PP)
Y. Treille (Meunier) (PP) – 46:21	2–3
Fleury – 46:56	3–3
	3–4	49:18 – Eberle (Burns, Crosby)

12 min
Penalties
8 min
21
Shots
43

=== Austria vs Latvia ===
9 May 2015; 16:15	Austria	1–2 OT (1–0, 0–1, 0–0) (OT 0–1)	Latvia	O2 Arena, Prague; Attendance: 12,735

Game reference

Bernhard Starkbaum
Goalies
Edgars Masaļskis
Referees:
(United States) Timothy Mayer
(Sweden) Tobias Bjork
Linesmen:
(Russia) Gleb Lazarev
(Czech Republic) Miroslav Lhotský

Lebler (M. Raffl) – 16:07	1–0
	1–1	32:15 – Dārziņš (Daugaviņš)
	1–2	60:33 – Daugaviņš (Dārziņš, Galviņš)

2 min
Penalties
16 min
29
Shots
18

=== Sweden vs Switzerland ===
9 May 2015; 20:15	Sweden	2–1 OT (1–0, 0–0, 0–1) (OT 1–0)	Switzerland	O2 Arena, Prague; Attendance: 15,201

Game reference

Jhonas Enroth
Goalies
Leonardo Genoni
Referees:
(Belarus) Maxim Sidorenko
(Russia) Vyacheslav Bulanov
Linesmen:
(Finland) Sakari Suominen
(Norway) Jon Killian

Lindholm (Rask, Ericsson) – 07:17	1–0
	1–1	40:34 – Bodenmann (Blum, Ambühl)
Forsberg (Eriksson, Ekman-Larsson) (PP) – 63:49	2–1

10 min
Penalties
8 min
29
Shots
16

== 10 May ==
=== Germany vs Czech Republic ===
10 May 2015; 16:15	Germany	2–4 (1–1, 1–2, 0–1)	Czech Republic	O2 Arena, Prague; Attendance: 17,383

Game reference

Timo Pielmeier
Goalies
Ondřej Pavelec
Referees:
(Sweden) Mikael Nord
(Sweden) Tobias Bjork
Linesmen:
(Finland) Sakari Suominen
(United States) Fraser McIntyre

Pietta (Müller, Krueger) – 07:13	1–0
	1–1	13:39 – Vondrka
Wolf (Rieder) – 23:50	2–1
	2–2	25:58 – Koukal (Kolář, Simon)
	2–3	27:36 – Voráček (Jágr, Nakládal) (PP)
	2–4	55:58 – Jágr (Červenka)

6 min
Penalties
6 min
14
Shots
38

=== Switzerland vs Canada ===
10 May 2015; 20:15	Switzerland	2–7 (1–2, 0–3, 1–2)	Canada	O2 Arena, Prague; Attendance: 17,003

Game reference

Reto Berra
Goalies
Mike Smith
Referees:
(United States) Timothy Mayer
(Finland) Jyri Rönn
Linesmen:
(Finland) Masi Puolakka
(Czech Republic) Miroslav Lhotský

	0–1	00:53 – Seguin (Muzzin, Giroux)
Trachsler (Schäppi, Streit) – 06:21	1–1
	1–2	19:42 – MacKinnon (Spezza, Wiercioch)
	1–3	27:59 – Ekblad (Couturier, Eakin)
	1–4	39:00 – Eberle (Crosby, Burns) (PP)
	1–5	39:59 – Eakin (Couturier, Ekblad)
Brunner – 42:17	2–5
	2–6	52:27 – Couturier (Toffoli, Hamhuis)
	2–7	57:08 – Giroux (Burns, O'Reilly) (PP)

16 min
Penalties
12 min
25
Shots
46

== 11 May ==
=== Germany vs Austria ===
11 May 2015; 16:15	Germany	2–3 GWS (0–0, 0–1, 2–1) (OT 0–0) (SO: 0–1)	Austria	O2 Arena, Prague; Attendance: 11,302

Game reference

Dennis Endras
Goalies
Bernhard Starkbaum
Referees:
(Russia) Vyacheslav Bulanov
(Russia) Konstantin Olenin
Linesmen:
(Sweden) Henrik Pihlblad
(Slovakia) Peter Šefčík

	0–1	34:33 – T. Raffl (M. Raffl, Heinrich)
Wolf (Pietta, Müller) – 44:14	1–1
	1–2	54:22 – Rotter (Muhlstein)
Reimer (Kohl, Krämmer) – 57:59	2–2

Hospelt (miss)
Rieder
Reimer (miss)
Shootout
Heinrich
Komarek
(miss) Lebler
6 min
Penalties
6 min
17
Shots
34

=== Sweden vs France ===
11 May 2015; 20:15	Sweden	4–2 (1–0, 1–2, 2–0)	France	O2 Arena, Prague; Attendance: 12,490

Game reference

Jhonas Enroth
Goalies
Cristobal Huet
Florian Hardy
Referees:
(Belarus) Maxim Sidorenko
(Slovakia) Jozef Kubuš
Linesmen:
(Russia) Gleb Lazarev
(Norway) Jon Killian

Josefson (Klefbom, Ekman-Larsson) – 11:00	1–0
	1–1	20:34 – Fleury (Roussel, T. Da Costa)
	1–2	22:52 – Fleury (Roussel, Auvitu)
Forsberg (Lindholm) (PP) – 34:52	2–2
Forsberg (Ekman-Larsson) – 40:52	3–2
Ekman-Larsson (Eriksson, Klefbom) – 43:27	4–2

10 min
Penalties
16 min
41
Shots
17

== 12 May ==
=== Canada vs Austria ===
12 May 2015; 12:15	Canada	10–1 (4–0, 2–0, 4–1)	Austria	O2 Arena, Prague; Attendance: 16,031

Game reference

Mike Smith
Goalies
Bernhard Starkbaum
Rene Swette
Referees:
(Belarus) Maxim Sidorenko
(Russia) Roman Gofman
Linesmen:
(Finland) Masi Puolakka
(Slovakia) Peter Šefčík

Barrie (O'Reilly, Giroux) – 06:04	1–0
Duchene (Spezza, Muzzin) – 09:09	2–0
Hall (Burns) – 11:17	3–0
Ekblad (Eberle) – 14:10	4–0
Spezza (Duchene, Wiercioch) – 21:58	5–0
Eberle (Burns) – 35:52	6–0
	6–1	42:44 – Heinrich (Rotter)
MacKinnon (Muzzin]) – 42:53	7–1
Spezza – 43:05	8–1
Schenn (Duchene) – 46:09	9–1
Duchene (MacKinnon, Spezza) – 54:43	10–1

0 min
Penalties
4 min
46
Shots
15

=== Latvia vs France ===
12 May 2015; 16:15	Latvia	2–3 GWS (1–0, 1–0, 0–2) (OT 0–0) (SO: 0–1)	France	O2 Arena, Prague; Attendance: 15,167

Game reference

Edgars Masaļskis
Goalies
Cristobal Huet
Referees:
(United States) Timothy Mayer
(Finland) Jyri Rönn
Linesmen:
(Finland) Sakari Suominen
(Czech Republic) Miroslav Lhotský

Daugaviņš (Dārziņš, Galviņš) – 11:25	1–0
Galviņš (Dārziņš, Daugaviņš) (PP) – 22:48	2–0
	2–1	48:21 – S. Da Costa (Fleury)
	2–2	55:20 – S. Treille (Hecquefeuille, Huet)

Dārziņš
Daugaviņš (miss)
Shootout
Fleury
Desrosiers
S. Da Costa
6 min
Penalties
6 min
13
Shots
35

=== Czech Republic vs Switzerland ===
12 May 2015; 20:15	Czech Republic	2–1 GWS (0–1, 0–0, 1–0) (OT 0–0) (SO: 1–0)	Switzerland	O2 Arena, Prague; Attendance: 17,383

Game reference
Ondřej Pavelec	Goalies	Reto Berra	Referees: (Slovakia) Jozef Kubuš (Russia) Konstantin Olenin; Linesmen: (Sweden) Henrik Pihlblad (United States) Fraser McIntyre
/ 0–1 / 16:56 – Fiala (Brunner, Streit) (PP2); Zaťovič (Kovář, Kolář) – 50:44 / 1–1			Referees: (Slovakia) Jozef Kubuš (Russia) Konstantin Olenin; Linesmen: (Sweden) Henrik Pihlblad (United States) Fraser McIntyre
Voráček; Kovář (miss); Vondrka	Shootout	Fiala; (miss) Ambühl; (miss) Loeffel	Referees: (Slovakia) Jozef Kubuš (Russia) Konstantin Olenin; Linesmen: (Sweden) Henrik Pihlblad (United States) Fraser McIntyre
12 min	Penalties	14 min	Referees: (Slovakia) Jozef Kubuš (Russia) Konstantin Olenin; Linesmen: (Sweden) Henrik Pihlblad (United States) Fraser McIntyre
29	Shots	27	Referees: (Slovakia) Jozef Kubuš (Russia) Konstantin Olenin; Linesmen: (Sweden) Henrik Pihlblad (United States) Fraser McIntyre
