= 2015 IIHF World Championship playoff round =

The playoff round of the 2015 IIHF World Championship was held from 14 to 17 May 2015. The top four of each preliminary group qualified for the playoff round.

== Qualified teams ==
Group	Winners	Runners-up	Third place	Fourth place
A	Canada	Sweden	Czech Republic	Switzerland
B	United States	Finland	Russia	Belarus

== Bracket ==
Quarterfinals
A1	Canada	9
B4	Belarus	0
B2	Finland	3
A3	Czech Republic	5
B1	United States	3
A4	Switzerland	1
A2	Sweden	3
B3	Russia	5

Semifinals
A1	Canada	2
A3	Czech Republic	0
B1	United States	0
B3	Russia	4

Finals
A1	Canada	6
B3	Russia	1
Bronze medal game
B1	United States	3
A3	Czech Republic	0

== Quarterfinals ==
=== United States vs Switzerland ===
The game started out with an early and surprising first period lead for Switzerland after a goal from NHLer Roman Josi. The United States scored 2 quick goals midway through of the game, switching the lead to the Americans, but the Swiss' weren't done until Jake Gardiner scored the third goal ten minutes before the end of the game which put the United States in the semifinals.

14 May 2015; 15:15	United States	3–1 (0–1, 2–0, 1–0)	Switzerland	ČEZ Aréna, Ostrava; Attendance: 6,495

Game reference

Connor Hellebuyck
Goalies
Reto Berra
Referees:
(Russia) Vyacheslav Bulanov
(Finland) Jyri Rönn
Linesmen:
(Sweden) Jimmy Dahmen
(Canada) Bevan Mills

	0–1	13:04 – Josi
Smith (Vesey, Arcobello) – 30:17	1–1
Coyle (Jones, Lee) – 31:14	2–1
Gardiner (Coyle, Lee) – 50:33	3–1

6 min
Penalties
4 min
24
Shots
22

=== Canada vs Belarus ===
The game was nearly wrapped up after the first period, in which Canada scored four goals, including one after just 27 seconds by Brent Burns. The Canadians were in full control and never let up and ended up winning convincingly 9–0 while putting up 50 shots.

14 May 2015; 16:15	Canada	9–0 (4–0, 2–0, 3–0)	Belarus	O2 Arena, Prague; Attendance: 15,126

Game reference

Mike Smith
Goalies
Kevin Lalande
Referees:
(United States) Timothy Mayer
(Sweden) Marcus Vinnerborg
Linesmen:
(Czech Republic) Miroslav Lhotský
(Norway) Jon Killian

Burns (Crosby, Hall) – 00:27	1–0
Ennis (Barrie, Muzzin) – 07:36	2–0
O'Reilly (Burns) – 10:15	3–0
Seguin (Spezza) (PP) – 17:28	4–0
Seguin (Couturier, Muzzin) – 23:23	5–0
Burns (O'Reilly, Eberle) (PP) – 31:08	6–0
Seguin (Hall) (PP) – 50:32	7–0
O'Reilly (Giroux, Savard) – 53:02	8–0
Spezza (Burns) – 55:19	9–0

6 min
Penalties
10 min
50
Shots
24

=== Sweden vs Russia ===
After around 20 minutes the game looked already decided in favour of Russia, but the Swedish team fought back and tied it up with five minutes to go. Only 26 seconds after the equalizer Evgeni Malkin scored the go-ahead goal for the Russians who advanced after scoring an empty netter late in the game.

14 May 2015; 19:15	Sweden	3–5 (0–2, 1–1, 2–2)	Russia	ČEZ Aréna, Ostrava; Attendance: 7,248

Game reference

Jhonas Enroth
Anders Nilsson
Goalies
Sergei Bobrovsky
Referees:
(Switzerland) Tobias Wehrli
(Czech Republic) Vladimír Šindler
Linesmen:
(Czech Republic) Vit Lederer
(United States) Paul Carnathan

	0–1	10:51 – Mozyakin (Malkin, Tarasenko) (PP2)
	0–2	16:01 – Shirokov (Tikhonov, Tarasenko)
	0–3	20:48 – Malkin (Kulemin, Belov)
Klingberg (Lander) (PP) – 31:01	1–3
Lander (Ekman-Larsson, Klingberg) – 43:36	2–3
Eriksson (Lander, Ekholm) – 54:45	3–3
	3–4	55:11 – Malkin (Mozyakin, Kulemin)
	3–5	58:13 – Tarasenko (ENG)

16 min
Penalties
14 min
28
Shots
28

=== Finland vs Czech Republic ===
The last quarterfinal of the day was the closest one as Finland and the Czech Republic matched up. The teams went toe to toe until it was 3–3 with 15 minutes to go. Jan Kovář and Jaromír Jágr became the heroes as both recorded three points to help the Czechs win the game 5–3.

14 May 2015; 20:15	Finland	3–5 (1–1, 1–2, 1–2)	Czech Republic	O2 Arena, Prague; Attendance: 17,383

Game reference

Pekka Rinne
Goalies
Ondřej Pavelec
Referees:
(Russia) Konstantin Olenin
(Russia) Roman Gofman
Linesmen:
(Russia) Gleb Lazarev
(United States) Fraser McIntyre

	0–1	08:56 – Kovář (Erat, Klepiš)
Ruutu (Kontiola, Lepistö) – 17:19	1–1
Jokinen (Lepistö, Donskoi) – 23:45	2–1
	2–2	33:51 – Jágr (Voráček, Kovář) (PP)
	2–3	35:28 – Kovář (Jágr, Voráček) (PP)
Barkov (Jokinen) – 44:24	3–3
	3–4	55:30 – Jágr
	3–5	59:37 – Sobotka (ENG)

10 min
Penalties
6 min
22
Shots
32

== Semifinals ==
=== Canada vs Czech Republic ===
Canada continued their unbeaten run against the hosts, who added Tomáš Plekanec shortly before the game, in front of 17,383 people. A goal from Taylor Hall after nearly nine minutes put Canada up 1–0 before Jason Spezza made it a two-goal lead midway through the game. The Czechs weren't able to squeeze a puck behind Mike Smith, who recorded his second straight shutout.

16 May 2015; 15:15	Canada	2–0 (1–0, 1–0, 0–0)	Czech Republic	O2 Arena, Prague; Attendance: 17,383

Game reference
Mike Smith	Goalies	Ondřej Pavelec	Referees: (Sweden) Marcus Vinnerborg (Russia) Vyacheslav Bulanov; Linesmen: (United States) Paul Carnathan (United States) Fraser McIntyre
Hall (Eberle, Crosby) – 08:40 / 1–0; Spezza (Duchene, Hamhuis) – 29:02 / 2–0			Referees: (Sweden) Marcus Vinnerborg (Russia) Vyacheslav Bulanov; Linesmen: (United States) Paul Carnathan (United States) Fraser McIntyre
4 min	Penalties	4 min	Referees: (Sweden) Marcus Vinnerborg (Russia) Vyacheslav Bulanov; Linesmen: (United States) Paul Carnathan (United States) Fraser McIntyre
41	Shots	23	Referees: (Sweden) Marcus Vinnerborg (Russia) Vyacheslav Bulanov; Linesmen: (United States) Paul Carnathan (United States) Fraser McIntyre

=== United States vs Russia ===
Russia got a boost before the game by adding Alexander Ovechkin to their roster. The game was scoreless through two periods before Sergei Mozyakin opened the scoring after 47 minutes. Ovechkin recorded his first two points shortly after to help Russia beat the United States 4–0 after a third period burst.

16 May 2015; 19:15	United States	0–4 (0–0, 0–0, 0–4)	Russia	O2 Arena, Prague; Attendance: 14,938

Game reference

Connor Hellebuyck
Goalies
Sergei Bobrovsky
Referees:
(Switzerland) Tobias Wehrli
(Finland) Jyri Rönn
Linesmen:
(Sweden) Jimmy Dahmen
(Canada) Bevan Mills

0–1	47:17 – Mozyakin (Bobrovsky)
0–2	50:19 – Ovechkin
0–3	55:28 – Shipachyov (Kulemin, Mozyakin)
0–4	58:35 – Malkin (Ovechkin) (ENG)

6 min
Penalties
4 min
35
Shots
30

== Bronze medal game ==
The US-team was able to grab the bronze medal despite being outshot 16 to 39 but were able to get a shutout. Two first period goals and the second goal by Charlie Coyle wrapped the 3–0 victory up.

17 May 2015; 16:15	United States	3–0 (2–0, 1–0, 0–0)	Czech Republic	O2 Arena, Prague; Attendance: 15,007

Game reference

Connor Hellebuyck
Goalies
Ondřej Pavelec
Referees:
(Sweden) Marcus Vinnerborg
(Finland) Jyri Rönn
Linesmen:
(Sweden) Jimmy Dahmen
(Russia) Gleb Lazarev

Bonino (Nelson, Coyle) – 07:25	1–0
Lewis (Eichel) – 18:13	2–0
Coyle (Bonino) – 39:10	3–0

12 min
Penalties
6 min
16
Shots
39

== Gold medal game ==
17 May 2015; 20:45	Canada	6–1 (1–0, 3–0, 2–1)	Russia	O2 Arena, Prague; Attendance: 17,383

Game reference

Mike Smith
Goalies
Sergei Bobrovsky
Referees:
(Switzerland) Tobias Wehrli
(Czech Republic) Vladimír Šindler
Linesmen:
(United States) Paul Carnathan
(Czech Republic) Miroslav Lhotský

Eakin (Ennis, Muzzin) – 18:10	1–0
Ennis (Eakin, Couturier) – 21:56	2–0
Crosby (Eberle, Hamhuis) – 27:22	3–0
Seguin (Giroux, Barrie) – 28:06	4–0
Giroux (Crosby, O'Reilly) (PP) – 48:58	5–0
MacKinnon (Savard) – 49:50	6–0
	6–1	52:47 – Malkin (Mozyakin, Kulikov)

4 min
Penalties
10 min
37
Shots
12
