= 2015 IIHF World Championship Group B =

Group B was one of two groups of the 2015 IIHF World Championship. The four best placed teams advanced to the playoff round, while the last placed team was relegated to Division I in 2016.

== Standings ==
Pos	Team	Pld	W	OTW	OTL	L	GF	GA	GD	Pts	Qualification or relegation
1	United States	7	5	1	0	1	22	14	+8	17	Advance to the playoff round
2	Finland	7	4	2	0	1	22	9	+13	16	Advance to the playoff round
3	Russia	7	4	1	1	1	30	16	+14	15	Advance to the playoff round
4	Belarus	7	4	0	2	1	20	19	+1	14	Advance to the playoff round
5	Slovakia	7	1	2	2	2	17	19	−2	9	
6	Norway	7	2	0	0	5	12	23	−11	6	
7	Denmark	7	1	0	1	5	10	20	−10	4	
8	Slovenia	7	1	0	0	6	9	22	−13	3	Relegation to Division I A

Updated to match(es) played on 12 May 2015. Source: Standings
Rules for classification: 1) points; 2) head-to-head points; 3) head-to-head goal difference; 4) head-to-head number of goals scored; 5) result against closest best-ranked team outside tied teams; 6) result against second-best ranked team outside tied teams; 7) seeding before tournament.

All times are local (UTC+2).

== 1 May ==
=== United States vs Finland ===
1 May 2015; 16:15	United States	5–1 (1–0, 2–1, 2–0)	Finland	ČEZ Aréna, Ostrava; Attendance: 8,812

Game reference

Connor Hellebuyck
Goalies
Pekka Rinne
Referees:
(Sweden) Tobias Bjork
(Russia) Vyacheslav Bulanov
Linesmen:
(Czech Republic) Vit Lederer
(Czech Republic) Rudolf Tošenovjan

Moses (Krug, Nelson) – 19:37	1–0
	1–1	25:40 – Jokipakka (Pesonen, Kemppainen)
Hendricks (Sexton) – 31:57	2–1
Sexton (Krug, Hendricks) – 34:74	3–1
Bonino (Moses, Nelson) – 46:19	4–1
Hendricks (Larkin) (ENG) – 57:22	5–1

8 min
Penalties
4 min
27
Shots
30

=== Russia vs Norway ===
1 May 2015; 20:15	Russia	6–2 (4–0, 2–2, 0–0)	Norway	ČEZ Aréna, Ostrava; Attendance: 6,314

Game reference

Sergei Bobrovsky
Goalies
Lars Volden
Referees:
(United States) Timothy Mayer
(Finland) Jyri Rönn
Linesmen:
(Sweden) Jimmy Dahmen
(Canada) Bevan Mills

Shipachyov (Kovalchuk, Dadonov) (PP) – 02:51	1–0
Anisimov (Kovalchuk) – 03:10	2–0
Zaripov (Mozyakin, Tikhonov) – 15:14	3–0
Tikhonov (Medvedev, Zaripov) – 16:53	4–0
	4–1	20:25 – Thoresen (M. Olimb, Holøs)
	4–2	26:50 – Thoresen (M. Olimb, Ask)
Chudinov (Mozyakin, Zaripov) – 29:08	5–2
Panarin (Shipachyov, Biryukov) – 34:10	6–2

8 min
Penalties
10 min
36
Shots
19

== 2 May ==
=== Slovakia vs Denmark ===
2 May 2015; 12:15	Slovakia	4–3 GWS (0–0, 0–1, 3–2) (OT 0–0) (SO: 1–0)	Denmark	ČEZ Aréna, Ostrava; Attendance: 8,812

Game reference

Ján Laco
Goalies
Patrick Galbraith
Referees:
(Russia) Vyacheslav Bulanov
(Finland) Jyri Rönn
Linesmen:
(Switzerland) Nicolas Fluri
(Germany) André Schrader

	0–1	25:05 – Bjorkstrand (J. Jensen, J. B. Jensen) (PP)
Sersen (Hudáček, Pánik) (PP) – 48:08	1–1
Viedenský (Dravecký, Lušňák) – 49:26	2–1
	2–2	49:57 – Hardt (Madsen)
Graňák (Dravecký, Laco) (PP) – 51:11	3–2
	3–3	57:46 – Nielsen

Gáborík (miss)
Viedenský
Dravecký (miss)
Gáborík (miss)
Viedenský (miss)
Daňo
Shootout
(miss) Hardt
Madsen
(miss) Spelling
(miss) J. Jensen
(miss) Hardt
(miss) Green
6 min
Penalties
10 min
43
Shots
19

=== Belarus vs Slovenia ===
2 May 2015; 16:15	Belarus	4–2 (2–1, 1–0, 1–1)	Slovenia	ČEZ Aréna, Ostrava; Attendance: 5,995

Game reference

Kevin Lalande
Goalies
Robert Kristan
Referees:
(Sweden) Mikael Nord
(Switzerland) Tobias Wehrli
Linesmen:
(Estonia) Anton Semjonov
(Czech Republic) Vit Lederer

Stas (Korobov, Gavrus) – 10:08	1–0
	1–1	10:42 – Jeglič (Tičar)
A. Kostitsyn (Stas, Gavrus) – 12:16	2–1
Kalyuzhny (A. Kostitsyn, S. Kostitsyn) – 23:51	3–1
	3–2	51:47 – Pance (Razingar, Kopitar)
Kitarov (ENG) – 59:41	4–2

4 min
Penalties
4 min
26
Shots
23

=== Norway vs United States ===
2 May 2015; 20:15	Norway	1–2 (1–1, 0–1, 0–0)	United States	ČEZ Aréna, Ostrava; Attendance: 6,301

Game reference

Lars Haugen
Goalies
Connor Hellebuyck
Referees:
(Belarus) Maxim Sidorenko
(Czech Republic) Vladimír Šindler
Linesmen:
(Canada) Bevan Mills
(Czech Republic) Rudolf Tošenovjan

Ask (Tollefsen, M. Olimb) – 06:39	1–0
	1–1	12:14 – Lewis (Vesey)
	1–2	25:58 – Nelson (Krug, Lewis)

12 min
Penalties
20 min
23
Shots
35

== 3 May ==
=== Russia vs Slovenia ===
3 May 2015; 12:15	Russia	5–3 (3–0, 1–2, 1–1)	Slovenia	ČEZ Aréna, Ostrava; Attendance: 7,557

Game reference

Konstantin Barulin
Goalies
Luka Gračnar
Referees:
(Sweden) Tobias Bjork
(Belarus) Maxim Sidorenko
Linesmen:
(Switzerland) Nicolas Fluri
(Czech Republic) Vit Lederer

Kovalchuk (Dadonov, Barulin) – 04:03	1–0
Kulemin (Antipin) – 04:39	2–0
Dadonov (Panarin, Shipachyov) (PP) – 18:56	3–0
	3–1	23:14 – Kopitar (Pretnar, Kranjc)
Shipachyov (Panarin, Dadonov) – 29:27	4–1
	4–2	34:30 – Pance
Dadonov (Shipachyov, Panarin) – 45:45	5–2
	5–3	54:46 – Sabolič (Tičar, Jeglič)

4 min
Penalties
4 min
35
Shots
25

=== Belarus vs Slovakia ===
3 May 2015; 16:15	Belarus	1–2 OT (0–0, 0–0, 1–1) (OT 0–1)	Slovakia	ČEZ Aréna, Ostrava; Attendance: 8,812

Game reference

Kevin Lalande
Goalies
Ján Laco
Referees:
(United States) Timothy Mayer
(Czech Republic) Vladimír Šindler
Linesmen:
(United States) Paul Carnathan
(Sweden) Jimmy Dahmen

S. Kostitsyn (Kalyuzhny, A. Kostitsyn) – 51:27	1–0
	1–1	52:31 – Meszároš (Hudáček, Dravecký)
	1–2	61:55 – Meszároš (Jurčo, Tatar)

8 min
Penalties
10 min
18
Shots
34

=== Denmark vs Finland ===
3 May 2015; 20:15	Denmark	0–3 (0–0, 0–3, 0–0)	Finland	ČEZ Aréna, Ostrava; Attendance: 8,353

Game reference

Sebastian Dahm
Goalies
Pekka Rinne
Referees:
(Sweden) Mikael Nord
(Switzerland) Tobias Wehrli
Linesmen:
(Germany) André Schrader
(Estonia) Anton Semjonov

0–1	27:47 – Jokinen (Salmela, Donskoi)
0–2	28:58 – Pesonen (Louhivaara, Kemppainen)
0–3	35:56 – Barkov (Lindell, Jokinen)

8 min
Penalties
2 min
16
Shots
41

== 4 May ==
=== Russia vs United States ===
4 May 2015; 16:15	Russia	2–4 (0–1, 1–1, 1–2)	United States	ČEZ Aréna, Ostrava; Attendance: 8,812

Game reference

Sergei Bobrovsky
Goalies
Jack Campbell
Referees:
(Sweden) Marcus Vinnerborg
(Germany) Daniel Piechaczek
Linesmen:
(Czech Republic) Rudolf Tošenovjan
(Canada) Bevan Mills

	0–1	06:22 – Lewis (Jones, Eichel)
Belov (Panarin, Dadonov) – 23:40	1–1
	1–2	26:22 – Krug (Jones, Faulk) (PP2)
	1–3	51:52 – Arcobello (Vesey)
Plotnikov (Kulikov, Anisimov) – 56:19	2–3
	2–4	59:51 – Nelson (Lee) (ENG)

6 min
Penalties
6 min
17
Shots
20

=== Norway vs Finland ===
4 May 2015; 20:15	Norway	0–5 (0–1, 0–2, 0–2)	Finland	ČEZ Aréna, Ostrava; Attendance: 6,634

Game reference

Lars Volden
Goalies
Pekka Rinne
Referees:
(United States) Timothy Mayer
(Sweden) Tobias Bjork
Linesmen:
(Sweden) Jimmy Dahmen
(Czech Republic) Vit Lederer

0–1	05:05 – Lindell (Jokinen, Barkov) (PP)
0–2	28:39 – Kemppainen (Lindell, Aaltonen) (PP2)
0–3	30:21 – Kemppainen (Lindell, Aaltonen) (PP2)
0–4	51:15 – Jokipakka (Komarov, Kemppainen)
0–5	52:11 – Jokinen (Salmela, Barkov)

10 min
Penalties
12 min
20
Shots
30

== 5 May ==
=== Denmark vs Belarus ===
5 May 2015; 16:15	Denmark	1–5 (1–0, 0–3, 0–2)	Belarus	ČEZ Aréna, Ostrava; Attendance: 4,796

Game reference

Patrick Galbraith
Goalies
Kevin Lalande
Referees:
(Switzerland) Daniel Stricker
(Slovakia) Jozef Kubuš
Linesmen:
(Switzerland) Nicolas Fluri
(Germany) André Schrader

Jakobsen (Madsen, Hardt) – 13:38	1–0
	1–1	20:44 – Gavrus (A. Kostitsyn, Kalyuzhny)
	1–2	27:27 – Kovyrshin (Kulakov, Stepanov)
	1–3	29:35 – Shinkevich (Kalyuzhny, A. Kostitsyn)
	1–4	45:36 – Kovyrshin (Kulakov, Shinkevich)
	1–5	54:44 – Usenko (Kitarov, Demkov)

18 min
Penalties
8 min
26
Shots
35

=== Slovakia vs Slovenia ===
5 May 2015; 20:15	Slovakia	3–1 (0–1, 0–0, 3–0)	Slovenia	ČEZ Aréna, Ostrava; Attendance: 8,812

Game reference

Ján Laco
Goalies
Robert Kristan
Referees:
(Russia) Konstantin Olenin
(Russia) Roman Gofman
Linesmen:
(Estonia) Anton Semjonov
(United States) Paul Carnathan

	0–1	06:20 – Urbas (Kranjc, Kovačevič) (PP)
Meszároš (Surový) (PP) – 47:57	1–1
Gáborík (Hudáček, Surový) – 54:16	2–1
Gáborík (ENG) – 59:59	3–1

6 min
Penalties
12 min
33
Shots
23

== 6 May ==
=== Russia vs Denmark ===
6 May 2015; 16:15	Russia	5–2 (2–0, 1–1, 2–1)	Denmark	ČEZ Aréna, Ostrava; Attendance: 7,682

Game reference

Sergei Bobrovsky
Goalies
Sebastian Dahm
Referees:
(United States) Timothy Mayer
(Sweden) Tobias Bjork
Linesmen:
(Canada) Bevan Mills
(Estonia) Anton Semjonov

Panarin (Dadonov, Shipachyov) (PP) – 10:53	1–0
Mozyakin (Malkin) – 13:17	2–0
	2–1	29:35 – Green (Spelling, O. Lauridsen)
Dadonov (Medvedev, Chudinov) (PP) – 38:45	3–1
	3–2	49:36 – Spelling (PP)
Mozyakin (Kulemin, Malkin) – 57:03	4–2
Tarasenko (Antipin, Plotnikov) – 57:51	5–2

12 min
Penalties
10 min
33
Shots
20

=== Slovakia vs Norway ===
6 May 2015; 20:15	Slovakia	2–3 (1–0, 1–2, 0–1)	Norway	ČEZ Aréna, Ostrava; Attendance: 8,812

Game reference

Ján Laco
Goalies
Lars Haugen
Referees:
(Switzerland) Daniel Stricker
(Sweden) Marcus Vinnerborg
Linesmen:
(Sweden) Jimmy Dahmen
(Czech Republic) Rudolf Tošenovjan

Surový (Gáborík, Hudáček) (PP) – 18:03	1–0
Ďaloga (Mikuš, Tatar) – 21:29	2–0
	2–1	25:40 – Nørstebø (Holøs, M. Olimb) (PP)
	2–2	35:30 – Rosseli Olsen (Ask, Martinsen)
	2–3	41:56 – Nørstebø (Thoresen, Holøs) (PP)

45 min
Penalties
10 min
24
Shots
23

== 7 May ==
=== United States vs Belarus ===
7 May 2015; 16:15	United States	2–5 (0–0, 1–3, 1–2)	Belarus	ČEZ Aréna, Ostrava; Attendance: 6,648

Game reference

Jack Campbell
Goalies
Kevin Lalande
Referees:
(Russia) Konstantin Olenin
(Russia) Roman Gofman
Linesmen:
(Czech Republic) Vit Lederer
(Germany) André Schrader

	0–1	31:11 – Gavrus (Lisovets, Shinkevich)
	0–2	33:01 – Volkov (S. Kostitsyn)
	0–3	36:06 – Kitarov (S. Kostitsyn)
Nelson (Eichel) – 37:21	1–3
	1–4	41:15 – Kalyuzhny (A. Kostitsyn, Usenko) (PP2)
Krug (Eichel, Lewis) (PP) – 45:35	2–4
	2–5	48:23 – Kalyuzhny (A. Kostitsyn, Lisovets)

8 min
Penalties
10 min
30
Shots
23

=== Finland vs Slovenia ===
7 May 2015; 20:15	Finland	4–0 (2–0, 2–0, 0–0)	Slovenia	ČEZ Aréna, Ostrava; Attendance: 6,450

Game reference

Pekka Rinne
Goalies
Gašper Krošelj
Referees:
(Slovakia) Jozef Kubuš
(Germany) Daniel Piechaczek
Linesmen:
(Switzerland) Nicolas Fluri
(United States) Paul Carnathan

Komarov (Pesonen, Kemppainen) – 05:53	1–0
Kontiola – 06:34	2–0
Barkov (Donskoi, Jokinen) – 21:19	3–0
Kemppainen (Ruutu, Aaltonen) (PP) – 35:57	4–0

4 min
Penalties
6 min
33
Shots
13

== 8 May ==
=== Slovenia vs Norway ===
8 May 2015; 16:15	Slovenia	1–3 (0–1, 1–2, 0–0)	Norway	ČEZ Aréna, Ostrava; Attendance: 8,812

Game reference

Robert Kristan
Goalies
Lars Haugen
Referees:
(Switzerland) Daniel Stricker
(Sweden) Marcus Vinnerborg
Linesmen:
(Sweden) Jimmy Dahmen
(Estonia) Anton Semjonov

	0–1	Thoresen (M. Olimb, Holøs) (PP) – 08:23
Muršak (Kopitar, Kranjc) – 20:15	1–1
	1–2	Bastiansen(K. Olimb, Sørvik) (PP) – 23:46
	1–3	Holøs (M. Olimb, Thoresen) (PP) – 38:49

10 min
Penalties
4 min
18
Shots
24

=== United States vs Denmark ===
8 May 2015; 20:15	United States	1–0 (0–0, 1–0, 0–0)	Denmark	ČEZ Aréna, Ostrava; Attendance: 8,812

Game reference
Connor Hellebuyck	Goalies	Sebastian Dahm	Referees: (Czech Republic) Pavel Hodek (Russia) Konstantin Olenin; Linesmen: (Czech Republic) Rudolf Tošenovjan (Canada) Bevan Mills
Nelson – 27:54 / 1–0			Referees: (Czech Republic) Pavel Hodek (Russia) Konstantin Olenin; Linesmen: (Czech Republic) Rudolf Tošenovjan (Canada) Bevan Mills
6 min	Penalties	6 min	Referees: (Czech Republic) Pavel Hodek (Russia) Konstantin Olenin; Linesmen: (Czech Republic) Rudolf Tošenovjan (Canada) Bevan Mills
41	Shots	21	Referees: (Czech Republic) Pavel Hodek (Russia) Konstantin Olenin; Linesmen: (Czech Republic) Rudolf Tošenovjan (Canada) Bevan Mills

== 9 May ==
=== Belarus vs Russia ===
9 May 2015; 12:15	Belarus	0–7 (0–1, 0–3, 0–3)	Russia	ČEZ Aréna, Ostrava; Attendance: 8,363

Game reference

Kevin Lalande
Igor Brikun
Goalies
Sergei Bobrovsky
Anton Khudobin
Referees:
(Switzerland) Daniel Stricker
(Germany) Daniel Piechaczek
Linesmen:
(Sweden) Jimmy Dahmen
(Switzerland) Nicolas Fluri

0–1	09:53 – Kovalchuk (Kulemin, Anisimov)
0–2	21:33 – Tarasenko (Anisimov, Medvedev)
0–3	29:24 – Shipachyov (Panarin, Dadonov)
0–4	32:22 – Panarin (Shipachyov, Mironov)
0–5	42:51 – Shirokov (PS)
0–6	44:49 – Dadonov (Malkin, Kovalchuk) (PP)
0–7	51:04 – Malkin (Tarasenko, Mozyakin) (PP)

18 min
Penalties
4 min
13
Shots
32

=== Finland vs Slovakia ===
9 May 2015; 16:15	Finland	3–0 (0–0, 0–0, 3–0)	Slovakia	ČEZ Aréna, Ostrava; Attendance: 8,812

Game reference

Juuse Saros
Goalies
Ján Laco
Referees:
(Sweden) Marcus Vinnerborg
(Russia) Konstantin Olenin
Linesmen:
(Canada) Bevan Mills
(United States) Paul Carnathan

Donskoi (Lindell, Jokinen) – 50:28	1–0
Aaltonen (Pesonen, Kemppainen) – 55:33	2–0
Komarov (ENG) – 59:53	3–0

8 min
Penalties
10 min
31
Shots
22

=== Denmark vs Norway ===
9 May 2015; 20:15	Denmark	4–1 (2–1, 1–0, 1–0)	Norway	ČEZ Aréna, Ostrava; Attendance: 7,316

Game reference

Sebastian Dahm
Goalies
Lars Haugen
Referees:
(Sweden) Marcus Vinnerborg
(Russia) Konstantin Olenin
Linesmen:
(Canada) Bevan Mills
(United States) Paul Carnathan

N. Jensen (A. Poulsen) – 01:51	1–0
	1–1	03:18 – K. Olimb (Olsen, Bonsaksen)
Nielsen (Jakobsen, Madsen) (PP) – 19:36	2–1
Storm (J. Jensen, Nielsen) (PP) – 33:01	3–1
Jakobsen (Hardt, Madsen) – 51:36	4–1

8 min
Penalties
8 min
19
Shots
25

== 10 May ==
=== Slovenia vs United States ===
10 May 2015; 16:15	Slovenia	1–3 (0–2, 1–0, 0–1)	United States	ČEZ Aréna, Ostrava; Attendance: 8,202

Game reference

Robert Kristan
Goalies
Connor Hellebuyck
Referees:
(Finland) Aleksi Rantala
(Russia) Roman Gofman
Linesmen:
(Czech Republic) Rudolf Tošenovjan
(Estonia) Anton Semjonov

	0–1	04:17 – Nelson (Reilly, Lewis)
	0–2	16:32 – Nelson (Lewis, Faulk) (PP)
Mušič (Ograjenšek, Pretnar) – 26:54	1–2
	1–3	41:09 – Eichel (Nelson, Lewis)

4 min
Penalties
6 min
22
Shots
17

=== Slovakia vs Russia ===
10 May 2015; 20:15	Slovakia	2–3 OT (1–0, 0–1, 1–1) (OT 0–1)	Russia	ČEZ Aréna, Ostrava; Attendance: 8,812

Game reference

Július Hudáček
Goalies
Sergei Bobrovsky
Referees:
(Czech Republic) Pavel Hodek
(Czech Republic) Vladimír Šindler
Linesmen:
(Switzerland) Nicolas Fluri
(Czech Republic) Vit Lederer

Kopecký (Pánik, Dravecký) – 05:58	1–0
	1–1	27:07 – Mozyakin (Chudinov, Kulemin) (PP)
	1–2	41:10 – Tarasenko (Antipin)
Gáborík (L. Hudáček) – 47:05	2–2
	2–3	62:06 – Panarin

4 min
Penalties
2 min
22
Shots
32

== 11 May ==
=== Finland vs Belarus ===
11 May 2015; 16:15	Finland	3–2 GWS (0–0, 0–0, 2–2) (OT 0–0) (SO: 1–0)	Belarus	ČEZ Aréna, Ostrava; Attendance: 8,812

Game reference

Pekka Rinne
Goalies
Vitali Koval
Referees:
(Switzerland) Daniel Stricker
(Switzerland) Tobias Wehrli
Linesmen:
(Czech Republic) Rudolf Tošenovjan
(Estonia) Anton Semjonov

	0–1	45:09 – Kovyrshin (Stepanov, Kulakov)
Donskoi (Lindell, Jokinen) (PP) – 51:57	1–1
Hartikainen (Jaakola, Kemppainen) – 52:51	2–1
	2–2	59:29 – Kalyuzhny (S. Kostitsyn) (EA)

Immonen
Donskoi
Jokinen
Shootout
(miss) S. Kostitsyn
Stepanov
8 min
Penalties
6 min
26
Shots
25

=== Slovenia vs Denmark ===
11 May 2015; 20:15	Slovenia	1–0 (1–0, 0–0, 0–0)	Denmark	ČEZ Aréna, Ostrava; Attendance: 6,768

Game reference
Gašper Krošelj	Goalies	Sebastian Dahm	Referees: (Sweden) Marcus Vinnerborg (Czech Republic) Vladimír Šindler; Linesmen: (United States) Paul Carnathan (Germany) André Schrader
Pance (Kovačevič, Kopitar) – 10:00 / 1–0			Referees: (Sweden) Marcus Vinnerborg (Czech Republic) Vladimír Šindler; Linesmen: (United States) Paul Carnathan (Germany) André Schrader
2 min	Penalties	2 min	Referees: (Sweden) Marcus Vinnerborg (Czech Republic) Vladimír Šindler; Linesmen: (United States) Paul Carnathan (Germany) André Schrader
21	Shots	24	Referees: (Sweden) Marcus Vinnerborg (Czech Republic) Vladimír Šindler; Linesmen: (United States) Paul Carnathan (Germany) André Schrader

== 12 May ==
=== Norway vs Belarus ===
12 May 2015; 12:15	Norway	2–3 (0–1, 1–2, 1–0)	Belarus	ČEZ Aréna, Ostrava; Attendance: 8,812

Game reference

Lars Haugen
Goalies
Kevin Lalande
Referees:
(Czech Republic) Pavel Hodek
(Sweden) Marcus Vinnerborg
Linesmen:
(Canada) Bevan Mills
(United States) Paul Carnathan

	0–1	07:29 – Kalyuzhny (S. Kostitsyn, A. Kostitsyn) (PP)
	0–2	29:01 – Korobov (S. Kostitsyn, Kalyuzhny) (PP)
	0–3	32:03 – A. Kostitsyn (Kalyuzhny, Stepanov) (PP)
Thoresen (M. Olimb, Holøs) – 32:20	1–3
Nørstebø (M. Olimb, Thoresen) – 45:13	2–3

16 min
Penalties
10 min
24
Shots
17

=== United States vs Slovakia ===
12 May 2015; 16:15	United States	5–4 OT (2–0, 2–4, 0–0) (OT 1–0)	Slovakia	ČEZ Aréna, Ostrava; Attendance: 8,812

Game reference

Connor Hellebuyck
Goalies
Ján Laco
Július Hudáček
Referees:
(Switzerland) Tobias Wehrli
(Germany) Daniel Piechaczek
Linesmen:
(Sweden) Jimmy Dahmen
(Switzerland) Nicolas Fluri

Smith (Moore, Arcobello) – 02:36	1–0
Jones (Eichel, Lewis) (PP) – 04:11	2–0
Lee (Faulk, Bonino) – 20:27	3–0
	3–1	26:29 – Gáborík (Dravecký, Meszároš) (PP)
	3–2	30:36 – Jánošík (Gáborík, Sersen)
	3–3	36:27 – Dravecký (Ďaloga, Kopecký)
	3–4	38:22 – Bartovič (Graňák)
Coyle (Redmond, Lee) – 39:08	4–4
Eichel – 64:32	5–4

10 min
Penalties
12 min
34
Shots
25

=== Finland vs Russia ===
12 May 2015; 20:15	Finland	3–2 GWS (0–1, 1–0, 1–1) (OT 0–0) (SO: 1–0)	Russia	ČEZ Aréna, Ostrava; Attendance: 8,812

Game reference

Pekka Rinne
Goalies
Sergei Bobrovsky
Referees:
(Sweden) Mikael Nord
(Sweden) Tobias Bjork
Linesmen:
(Czech Republic) Vit Lederer
(Germany) André Schrader

	0–1	18:04 – Mozyakin (Malkin, Kulemin)
Barkov (Pesonen, Jokinen) (PP) – 24:54	1–1
	1–2	54:54 – Panarin (Dadonov, Chudinov)
Donskoi (Barkov, Jokinen) – 57:41	2–2

Immonen (miss)
Donskoi (miss)
Jokinen (miss)
Barkov (miss)
Donskoi
Shootout
(miss) Panarin
(miss) Mozyakin
(miss) Tarasenko
(miss) Kovalchuk
(miss) Panarin
25 min
Penalties
6 min
30
Shots
35
