= 2015 IIHF World Championship final =

Ice hockey match

| | 1 | 2 | 3 | Total |
|---|---|---|---|---|
| Canada | 1 | 3 | 2 | 6 |
| Russia | 0 | 0 | 1 | 1 |
- Date: 17 May 2015
- Arena: O2 Arena
- City: Prague
- Attendance: 17,383

The 2015 IIHF World Championship final was played at the O2 Arena in Prague, Czech Republic, on 17 May 2015 between Canada and Russia. The game started at 20:45 local time (UTC+02:00). It was the third time since the dissolution of the Soviet Union in 1991 that Russia and Canada met in the IIHF World Championship final. Canada got on the board first, scoring late in the first period. They proceeded to dominate the second period, outshooting Russia 14–1 and scoring three goals. Canada added two goals in the third period before Russia scored one to make the final score 6–1.

For Canada, it was the first IIHF World Championship gold medal since 2007. They became the fourth team in the event's history to go undefeated, finishing with a 10–0 record. Sidney Crosby became the 26th player in the Triple Gold Club (Olympic, World, and Stanley Cup Championships) and the first player to win all three as a team captain.

== Road to the final ==
=== Canada ===
Entering the IIHF World Championships, Canada was the heavy favourite due to strong roster including Sidney Crosby, Matt Duchene, Claude Giroux and Tyler Seguin. The team went 7–0 in round robin play then defeated Belarus 9–0 in the quarterfinals and the Czech Republic 2–0 in the semi-finals.

=== Russia ===
Russia entered the tournament as the defending champion. Their team featured a high-powered offence behind stars Ilya Kovalchuk, Evgeni Malkin, Alexander Ovechkin and Vladimir Tarasenko. The team went 5–2 in round robin play, with one of the losses being on a shootout. They then defeated Sweden 5–3 in the quarterfinals and the United States 4–0 in the semifinals.

=== Summary ===
Canada
Round
Russia
Opponent
Result
Preliminary round
Opponent
Result
Latvia
6–1
Game 1
Norway
6–2
Germany
10–0
Game 2
Slovenia
5–3
Czech Republic
6–3
Game 3
United States
2–4
Sweden
6–4
Game 4
Denmark
5–2
France
4–3
Game 5
Belarus
7–0
Switzerland
7–2
Game 6
Slovakia
3–2 (OT)
Austria
10–1
Game 7
Finland
2–3 (GWS)

| Team | Pld | W | OTW | OTL | L | GF | GA | GD | Pts |
|---|---|---|---|---|---|---|---|---|---|
| Canada | 7 | 7 | 0 | 0 | 0 | 49 | 14 | +35 | 21 |
| Sweden | 7 | 4 | 2 | 0 | 1 | 34 | 19 | +15 | 16 |
| Czech Republic | 7 | 4 | 1 | 1 | 1 | 27 | 18 | +9 | 15 |
| Switzerland | 7 | 2 | 0 | 4 | 1 | 12 | 18 | −6 | 10 |
| Germany | 7 | 2 | 0 | 1 | 4 | 11 | 24 | −13 | 7 |
| France | 7 | 1 | 1 | 0 | 5 | 13 | 20 | −7 | 5 |
| Latvia | 7 | 0 | 2 | 1 | 4 | 11 | 25 | −14 | 5 |
| Austria | 7 | 0 | 2 | 1 | 4 | 10 | 29 | −19 | 5 |

Source: IIHF
Preliminary

| Team | Pld | W | OTW | OTL | L | GF | GA | GD | Pts |
|---|---|---|---|---|---|---|---|---|---|
| United States | 7 | 5 | 1 | 0 | 1 | 22 | 14 | +8 | 17 |
| Finland | 7 | 4 | 2 | 0 | 1 | 22 | 9 | +13 | 16 |
| Russia | 7 | 4 | 1 | 1 | 1 | 30 | 16 | +14 | 15 |
| Belarus | 7 | 4 | 0 | 2 | 1 | 20 | 19 | +1 | 14 |
| Slovakia | 7 | 1 | 2 | 2 | 2 | 17 | 19 | −2 | 9 |
| Norway | 7 | 2 | 0 | 0 | 5 | 12 | 23 | −11 | 6 |
| Denmark | 7 | 1 | 0 | 1 | 5 | 10 | 20 | −10 | 4 |
| Slovenia | 7 | 1 | 0 | 0 | 6 | 9 | 22 | −13 | 3 |

Source: IIHF
Opponent
Result
Playoff
Opponent
Result
Belarus
9–0
Quarterfinals
Sweden
5–3
Czech Republic
2–0
Semifinals
United States
4–0

== Match ==
The opening period was penalty-free. Both teams had good scoring opportunities, but Canada controlled the puck, spending much of the period in the Russian zone. Canada got on the board first when Russian Viktor Tikhonov failed to clear the zone. Tyler Ennis got the puck from Jake Muzzin, weaved through the middle of the ice and got off a low shot. The puck hit Cody Eakin's skate and went in at the 18:10 mark.

Canada dominated the second period, outshooting Russia 14–1 on the period. Ennis opened the scoring for Canada 1:56 into the period when his curl around the net caught goalkeeper Sergei Bobrovski by surprise. Canada's Sidney Crosby scored next on a high shot over Bobrovski's glove at the 7:22 mark, after receiving a tip pass from Jordan Eberle. Forty-four seconds later, Tyler Seguin scored the fourth goal for Canada on a pass from Claude Giroux with a delayed penalty in effect. Russian coach Oleg Znarok called a timeout midway through the period, but Canada kept pressing.

Canada took a 5–0 lead on a Giroux power-play goal, assisted by Crosby, 8:58 into the period. Nathan MacKinnon made it 6–0 less than a minute later. Russia finally got on the board on an Evgeni Malkin goal, assisted by Sergei Mozyakin, 12:47 into the period. The goal ended a 190:03 shutout streak for Canadian goalkeeper Mike Smith and concluded the scoring. For the game, Bobrovsky allowed 6 goals on 37 shots, while Smith gave up 1 goal on 12 shots.

Canada outscored their opponents 66–15 throughout the tournament and became the fourth team to go undefeated at the World Championships since 1994. The team was awarded a 1 million Swiss Franc "Team Jackpot" prize as a result. Six of the tournament's top ten point scorers were member of team Canada, led by Jason Spezza's 14. It was the first gold medal for Canada since 2007, and first medal of any kind since 2009. Crosby entered the Triple Gold Club – players who have won the Stanley Cup, Olympic gold, and World Championship gold – with the win. He became the first person to win all three as team captain, and the 26th Triple Gold player member.

After the game Crosby remarked, "I don't think you come into a game like this thinking you're going to win 6–1 ... We got better as the tournament went on, and we saved our best for last here today." Ovechkin said his team "threw the game away" in the second period but added, "Of course [Canada] played really well today, it's obvious that they're a good experienced team and they showed it today." He was also quoted as saying, "[O]f course, someone was tired and maybe someone was less prepared. But all of us were in similar conditions, and speaking about fatigue would be wrong [...] Everyone fought and did their best, but unfortunately, the Canadians were much stronger than us."

At the medal ceremony, most Russian players walked out before the Canadian anthem was played. Sport commentator Don Cherry called the Russian team "had no class" and said they could not accept clear defeat. After the tournament, Russian officials had claimed this was an organizational error, not a means of disrespect, however, the general manager later apologized to Canada for the incident. IIHF investigated the incident and fined Russia 80,000 Swiss francs; the Russian federation accepted the fine.

The United States took the bronze medal with a 3–0 win over the Czech Republic. Spezza received the directorate award winner as the tournament's best forward. Brent Burns was named the best defenceman. Finland's Pekka Rinne took the award for best goaltender. The media all-star team included Burns, Spezza, Canada's Taylor Hall, Sweden's Oliver Ekman-Larsson, Czech's Jaromír Jágr, and US goalie Connor Hellebuyck. Jágr, who had six goals and three assists, was named MVP by the media.

=== Box score ===
| 17 May 2015; 20:45 | Canada | 6–1 (1–0, 3–0, 2–1) | Russia | O2 Arena, Prague; Attendance: 17,383 |

Game reference

Mike Smith
Goalies
Sergei Bobrovsky
Referees:
(Switzerland) Tobias Wehrli
(Czech Republic) Vladimír Šindler
Linesmen:
(United States) Paul Carnathan
(Czech Republic) Miroslav Lhotský

| Eakin (Ennis, Muzzin) – 18:10 | 1–0 |
| Ennis (Eakin, Couturier) – 21:56 | 2–0 |
| Crosby (Eberle, Hamhuis) – 27:22 | 3–0 |
| Seguin (Giroux, Barrie) – 28:06 | 4–0 |
| Giroux (Crosby, O'Reilly) (PP) – 48:58 | 5–0 |
| MacKinnon (Savard) – 49:50 | 6–0 |
| | 6–1 | 52:47 – Malkin (Mozyakin, Kulikov) |

4 min
Penalties
10 min
37
Shots
12
