= Guldpipan =

- Date: 1982
- Country: Sweden
- Presented by: Sveriges ishockeyspelares centralorganisation

Guldpipan (English: golden whistle) officially known as SICO:s guldpipa, is a Swedish ice hockey award, awarded annually since 1982 to the premier referee in the Swedish Hockey League (SHL) as judged by the members of Sveriges ishockeyspelares centralorganisation (SICO; English: Sweden's ice hockey players central organisation). The award holds a high status among officials since only players are allowed to vote. Ulf Rådbjer has the record of winning the award seven consecutive times.

== Winners ==
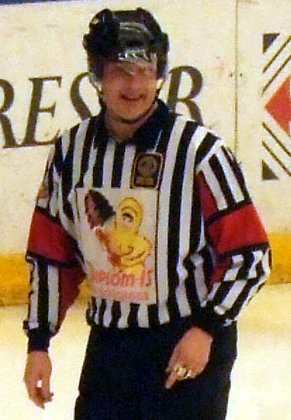
Ulf Rådbjer, seven-time winner of Guldpipan

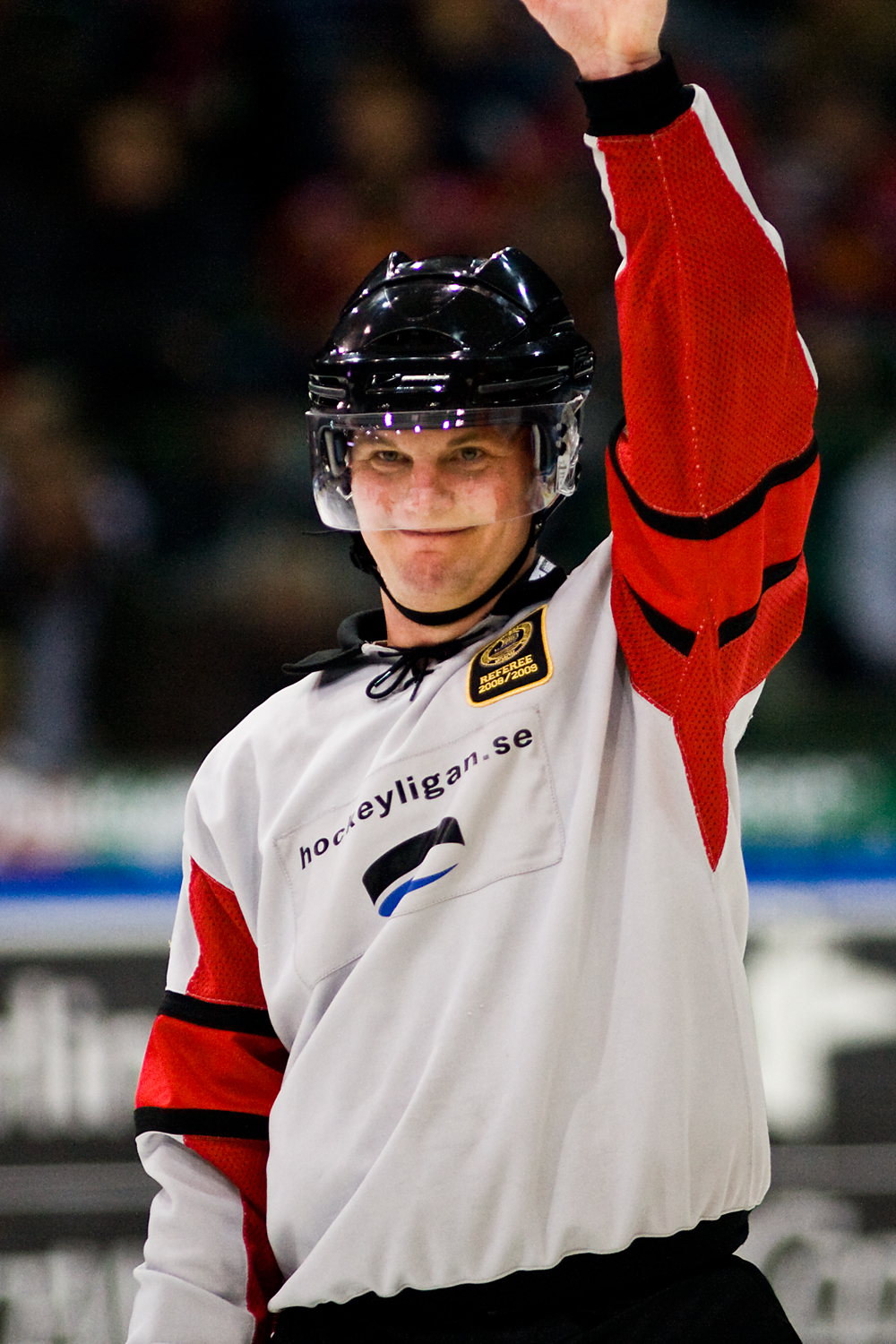
Marcus Vinnerborg, three-time winner

Referee still active

Year	Winner	Win #
1982	Gary Eriksson	1
1983	Gary Eriksson	2
1984	Lars Henriksson	1
1985	Ulf Lindgren	1
1986	Gary Eriksson	3
1987	Kjell Lind	1
1988	Kjell Lind	2
1989	Kjell Lind	3
1990	Börje Johansson	1
1991	Börje Johansson	2
1992	Börje Johansson	3
1993	Roger Öberg	1
1994	Jörgen Grundström	1
1995	Roger Öberg	2
1996	Roger Öberg	3
1997	Ulf Rådbjer	1
1998	Ulf Rådbjer	2
1999	Ulf Rådbjer	3
2000	Ulf Rådbjer	4
2001	Ulf Rådbjer	5
2002	Ulf Rådbjer	6
2003	Ulf Rådbjer	7
2004	Thomas Andersson	1
2005	Thomas Andersson	2
2006	Thomas Andersson	3
2007	Thomas Andersson	4
2008	Marcus Vinnerborg	1
2009	Marcus Vinnerborg	2
2010	Marcus Vinnerborg	3
2011	Ulf Rönnmark	1
2012	Ulf Rönnmark	2
2013	Ulf Rönnmark	3
2014	Mikael Nord	1
2015	Mikael Nord	2
2016	Mikael Nord	3
2017	Mikael Nord	4
2018	Mikael Nord	5
2019	Mikael Sjöqvist	1
2021	Mikael Nord	6
