= Victor Rask =

Swedish ice hockey player (born 1993)

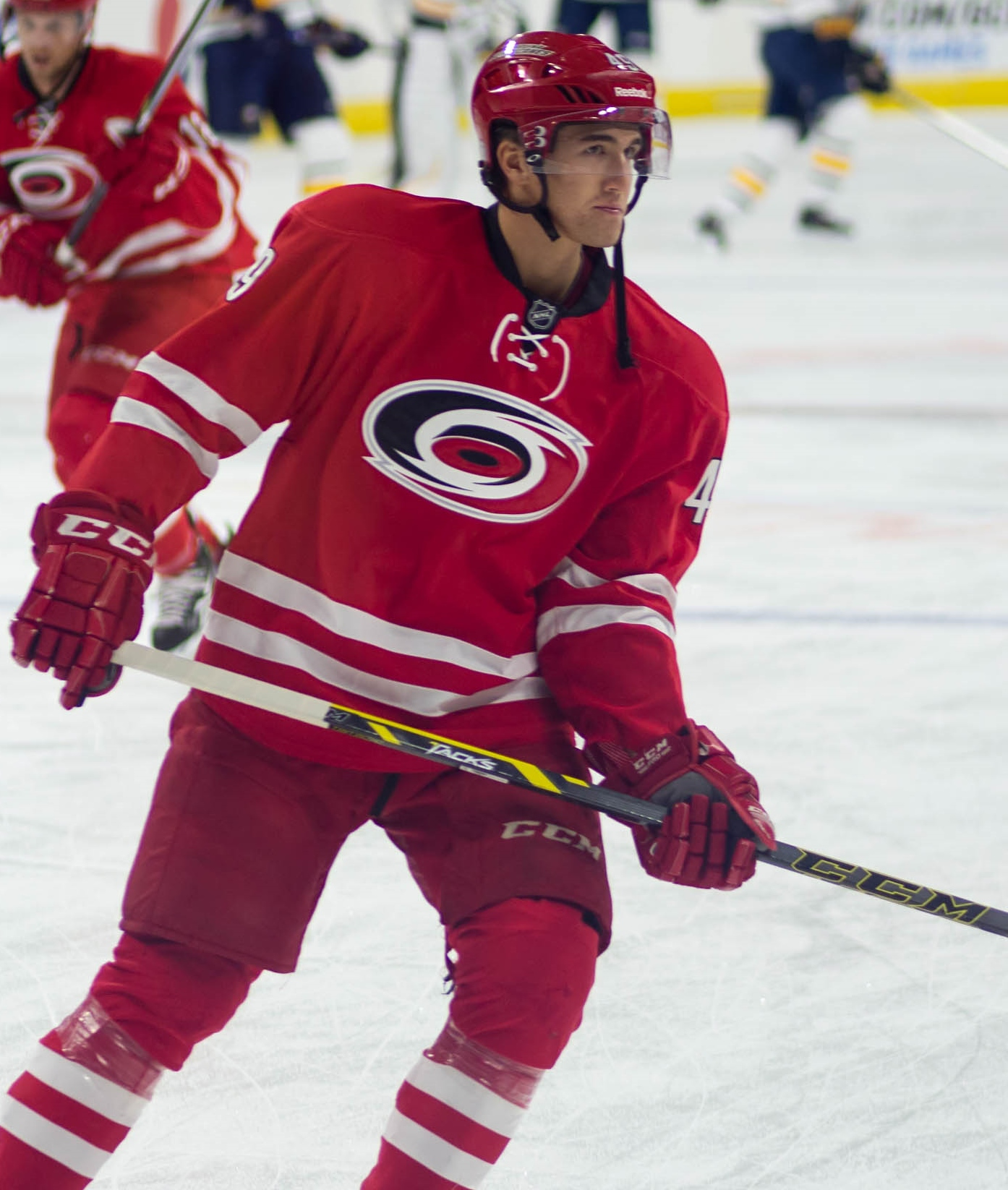
- Rask with the Carolina Hurricanes in 2014
- Born: 1 March 1993 (age 33) Leksand, Sweden
- Height: 6 ft 2 in (188 cm)
- Weight: 201 lb (91 kg; 14 st 5 lb)
- Position: Center
- Shoots: Left
- NL team Former teams: SC Rapperswil-Jona Lakers; Leksands IF; Carolina Hurricanes; Minnesota Wild; Seattle Kraken; HC Fribourg-Gottéron
- National team: Sweden
- NHL draft: 42nd overall, 2011; Carolina Hurricanes
- Playing career: 2010–present

Victor Rask (born 1 March 1993) is a Swedish professional ice hockey center who is currently playing with the SC Rapperswil-Jona Lakers of the National League (NL) after he spent eight years in the National Hockey League (NHL), playing for the Carolina Hurricanes, Minnesota Wild, and Seattle Kraken.

Born and raised in Leksand, Sweden, Rask began his playing career with Leksands IF of the then Swedish HockeyAllsvenskan. Following the 2010–11 HockeyAllsvenskan season, in which he tallied five goals and six assists, Rask was drafted by two North American organizations. He was first drafted by the Carolina Hurricanes in the second round (42nd overall) of the 2011 NHL entry draft and then taken by the Calgary Hitmen of the Western Hockey League (WHL) in the 2011 CHL Import Draft. Rask chose to begin his major junior hockey with the Hitmen during the 2011–12 season and played two full seasons in the WHL before officially joining the Hurricanes organization.

Rask made his NHL debut for the Hurricanes during the 2014–15 season and matched numerous franchise records. With a record of 11 goals and 22 assists through 78 games, he became the sixth rookie in Hurricanes history to hit the 30-point milestone. Rask also joined a franchise record by becoming one of five Hurricanes rookies to score 10 or more goals in a season since the team’s relocation to Raleigh. On 17 January 2019, Rask was traded by the Hurricanes to the Minnesota Wild in exchange for winger Nino Niederreiter. After playing with the team for nearly four seasons, Rask was traded by the Wild to the Seattle Kraken for future considerations in 2022.

== Playing career ==
Rask began his playing career as a youth within Leksands IF organization of the then Swedish HockeyAllsvenskan.

=== Calgary Hitmen and Charlotte Checkers ===
Following the 2010–11 HockeyAllsvenskan season, in which he tallied five goals and six assists, Rask was drafted by two North American organizations. He was first drafted by the Carolina Hurricanes in the second round, 42nd overall, of the 2011 NHL entry draft. Prior to the draft, The Hockey News suggested that Rask would be selected 26th overall. Rask was then drafted third overall by the Calgary Hitmen of the Western Hockey League (WHL) in the 2011 CHL Import Draft. Despite also being drafted by Dinamo Riga of the Kontinental Hockey League, Rask was assigned to begin his major junior hockey with the Hitmen during the 2011–12 season. He began his rookie season strong and tallied his first WHL hat-trick in a 7–1 win over the Swift Current Broncos on 18 October. After playing his first eight games, and accumulating 10 points, Rask signed a three-year entry-level contract with the Carolina Hurricanes on 20 October 2011. He continued to produce for the Hitmen and quickly tallied 15 goals and nine assists through 29 games by December to lead all league rookies in scoring. As the new year began, Rask had recorded 27 goal and hit the 50-point milestone to rank fifth among WHL rookies. By early March, he had tallied 30 goals to help the Hitmen clinch home-ice advantage for the 2012 WHL playoffs. Rask finished the season with 30 goals and 60 points to earn the team's Rookie of the Year.

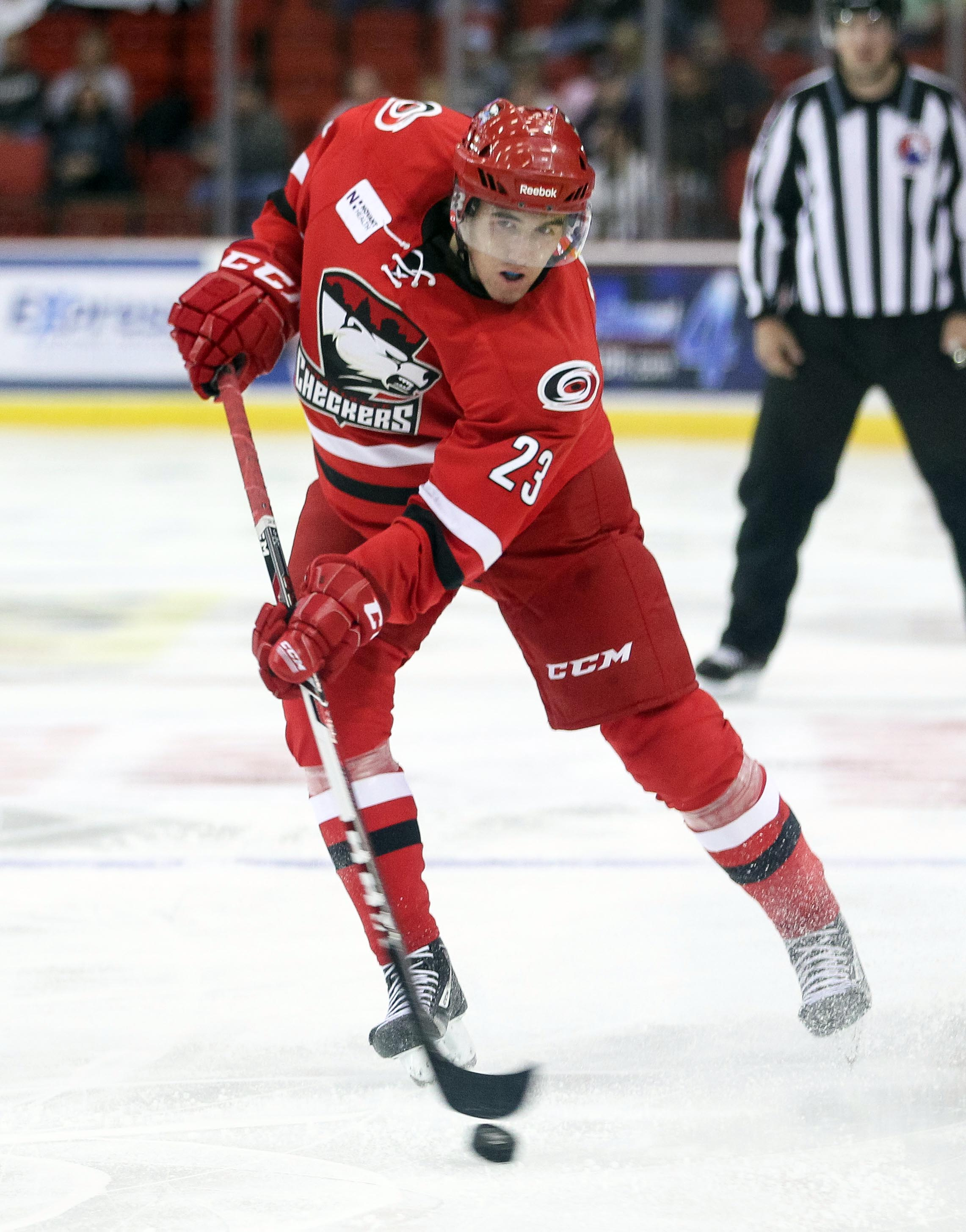
Rask with the Charlotte Checkers in 2013.

Upon concluding his rookie season, Rask was invited to participate in the Hurricanes' 2012 training camp prior to the start of the 2012–13 season. He was subsequently assigned to their American Hockey League (AHL) affiliate, the Charlotte Checkers on 15 September 2012. Rask played 10 games with the Checkers on their third line and accumulated one goal and four assists before re-joining the Hitmen. Later in December, Rask was selected to play for Team Sweden at the 2013 World Junior Ice Hockey Championships. Although Team Sweden qualified for the gold medal round, they lost to the United States 3–1. As a result of his time in the AHL and with Team Sweden, Rask played only 13 games for the Hitmen by 23 January 2013. During these games, Rask centred a line between Zane Jones and Colten Mayor and produced at a point a game. He experienced a three game pointless streak before recording his second WHL hat-trick to lead the Hitmen to a win over the Tri-City Americans and place them 11 points back of the Edmonton Oil Kings. As the season began to draw to a close, head coach Mike Williamson created a new top-line consisting of Rask, Brooks Macek, and Jake Virtanen. In one of their first games together, the trio combined for five goals, five assists and a plus-nine rating. As the Hitmen qualified for the 2013 WHL playoffs, Rask posted six goals and 10 assists through 17 games as the team fell to the Oil Kings in the Eastern Conference Final.

Once the Hitmen were eliminated from playoff contention, Rask concluded his major junior career with 47 goals and 57 assists for 104 points through 101 games. He was invited to participate in the NHL Prospects Tournament and Hurricanes training camp but spent the entire 2013–14 season with the Charlotte Checkers. Upon re-joining the Checkers, Rask was immediately placed on their first line alongside Zach Boychuk and Aaron Palushaj. Although Rask began the season with 10 points in 10 games, he experienced a 24-game goal drought that was snapped in a 5–2 win over the Oklahoma City Barons on 10 January. Upon snapping the drought, Rask also tallied 10 points in his last 10 games of the season to finish the season with 39 points through 76 games.

=== Carolina Hurricanes ===
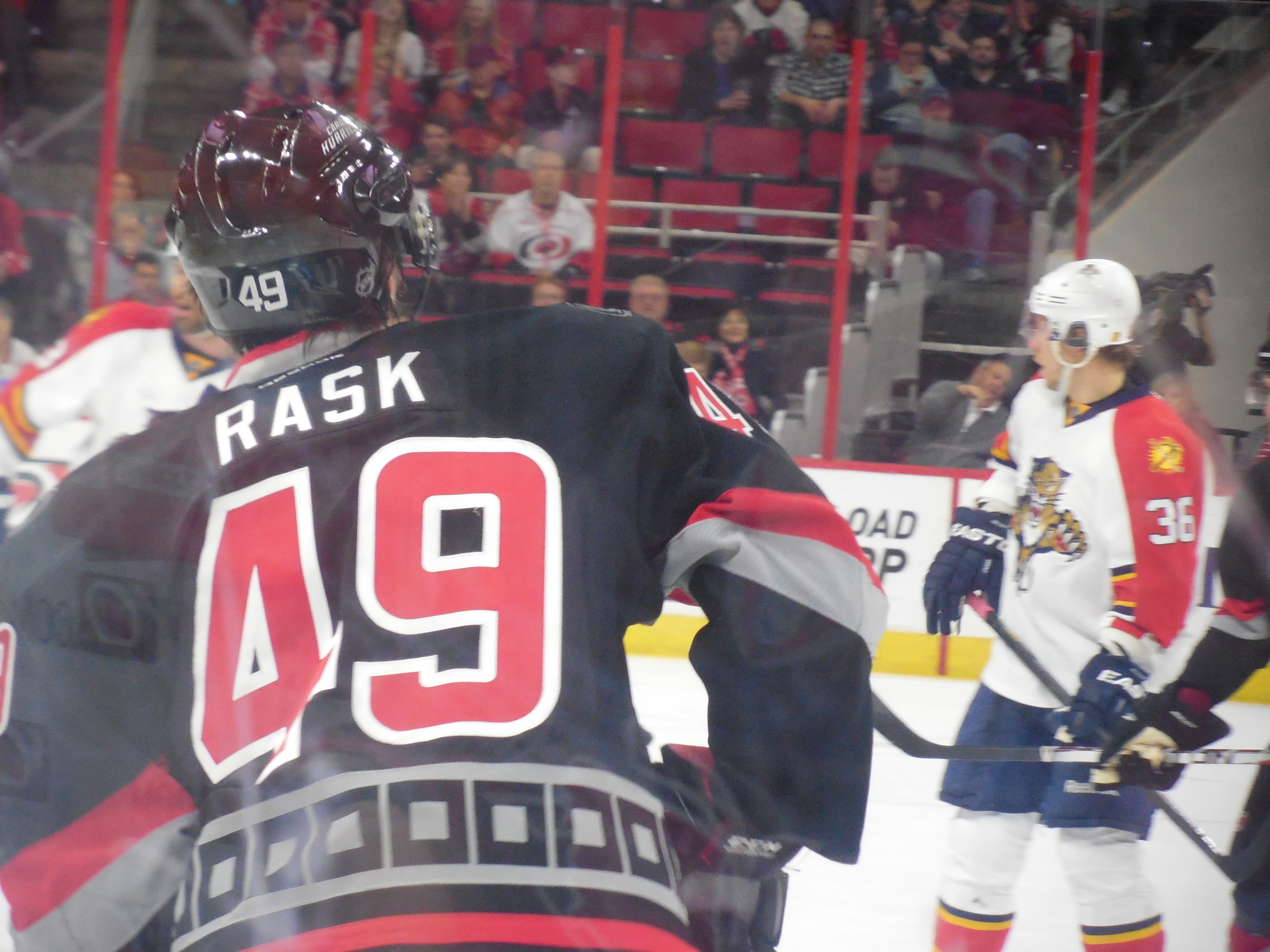
Rask during a game against the Florida Panthers in March 2015.

Following his first full professional season, Rask participated in his third NHL Prospects Tournament where he scored the overtime winner over the New York Rangers prospects. He finished the tournament leading all skaters with four goals and five assists for nine points. Rask subsequently cracked the Hurricanes roster for the 2014–15 season, and made his NHL debut on 10 October against the New York Islanders. Upon making his NHL debut, Rask helped the Hurricanes become the 10th youngest team in the league with the average age of the team’s opening night lineup being 27.3 years old. Rask was quickly assigned to a center role on the second line between Jeff Skinner and Elias Lindholm. On this line, Rask tallied his first career NHL goal on 2 November against the Los Angeles Kings to lead the Hurricanes to their second consecutive win of the season. After playing in every game to start the season, Rask served as a healthy scratch for the first time on 16 February in order to rest and learn the game. He spent another two games as a healthy scratch before re-joining the lineup as a center for Nathan Gerbe and Lindholm while former linemate Skinner played with Riley Nash and Alexander Semin. Through February and the following month, Rask accumulated 10 points which included two goals and four assists through three straight games. Rask continued to gain momentum as the season reached a close and became the sixth rookie in Hurricanes history to hit the 30-point milestone with 11 goals and 22 assists through 78 games. He also ranked 10th among NHL rookies in points and second among rookies in faceoff percentage. Rask also joined a franchise record by becoming one of five Hurricanes rookies to score 10 or more goals in a season since the team’s relocation to Raleigh.

Rask returned to the Hurricanes lineup for the 2015–16 NHL season and reclaimed his centre position between former linemate Jeff Skinner and Chris Terry. By 17 December, Rask had tied his season and career-high by tallying four goals and seven assists through his past 12 games. He continued to produce offensively as the Hurricanes began their playoff push and recorded the first multigoal game of his career on 27 March to also reach the 20 goal milestone for the first time. Rask finished the 2015–16 season with a career-high 21 goals and 27 assists through 80 games while also leading the team in power-play points. As a result of his productive season, Rask signed a six-year, $24 million contract extension with an average annual value (AAV) of $4 million per season on 12 July 2016.

Coming off of his most successful season, Rask underwent shoulder surgery which interrupted his workout regimen during the offseason. However, Rask stated that he was healthy to begin the 2016–17 season and was named an alternate captain for the Hurricanes alongside Jordan Staal, Justin Faulk, and Jeff Skinner. During the month of October, Rask centred a line between Skinner and Lee Stempniak where he tallied 10 points through their first eight games. As the season continued, however, Rask began to lose productivity and went 14 consecutive games without a point starting in mid-January as the team went 4–9–1. He scored eight goals in the last 65 games of the season to finish the season with 45 points and a minus-10 rating. Following the Hurricanes regular-season ending, Rask stated that he put too much pressure on himself during the year and needed to hold on to the puck longer and make more plays. Despite his dip in production, Rask was protected by the Hurricanes in the 2017 NHL Expansion Draft.

Prior to the start of the 2017–18 season, Rask was dropped from being an alternative captain after Staal and Faulk were named co-captain with Skinner serving as the permanent alternative. His productivity as the team's second-line centre continued its decline from the previous season as he scored five points through the first 19 games of the season. As such, coach Bill Peters scratched Rask for the first time since his rookie season and replaced him on the second line with Elias Lindholm. Rask tallied 14 goals and 17 assists to finish his fourth full professional season before being sidelined for the remainder of the 2017–18 campaign due to a shoulder injury.

During the offseason prior to the 2018–19 season, Rask underwent surgery to repair two fingers he injured while preparing food. He missed 20 games before making his season debut for the Hurricanes on 21 November 2018 against the Toronto Maple Leafs. In his debut game, Rask played 10:32 while centering a line between Warren Foegele and Phillip Di Giuseppe and winning four of seven faceoffs.

=== Minnesota Wild ===
On 17 January 2019, Rask was traded by the Hurricanes to the Minnesota Wild in exchange for winger Nino Niederreiter. Once he joined the Wild, Rask played a center role alongside wingers Zach Parise and Pontus Aberg. While playing in this role, Rask quickly began producing for the team and recorded an assist and a goal within his first four games. However, he suffered a lower body injury on 12 February in an eventual 5–4 loss to the Philadelphia Flyers and missed nearly a month to recover. He returned to the Wild's lineup in early March as the team begin their homestand against the San Jose Sharks. Upon returning, he scored his first goal in 15 games in a win over the Winnipeg Jets although the team was eliminated from playoff contention. Rask finished the season with two goals and one assist for three points through 23 games for the Wild.

Rask began the 2019–20 season as a healthy scratch for the first three games before making his debut on 12 October. Upon joining the lineup, Rask tallied an assist in their home opener loss to the Pittsburgh Penguins and scored his first goal of the season two days later. His strong offensive output was stymied later that month after he missed two games due to a lower-body injury. Once he returned to the lineup, the Wild posted a 4–0–1 record as Rask consistently played between Ryan Donato and Ryan Hartman. As injuries fell upon the team in mid-December, Rask began successfully centering their fourth line with Hartman and Marcus Foligno. He then served as a healthy scratch for seven games before returning to the lineup on 8 March 2020 for a game against the Anaheim Ducks. During the contest, Rask tied the game in the third period to help lead the Wild into the first wild card from the Western Conference. Rask finished his second season with the Wild tallying five goals and eight assists through 43 games.

=== Seattle Kraken ===
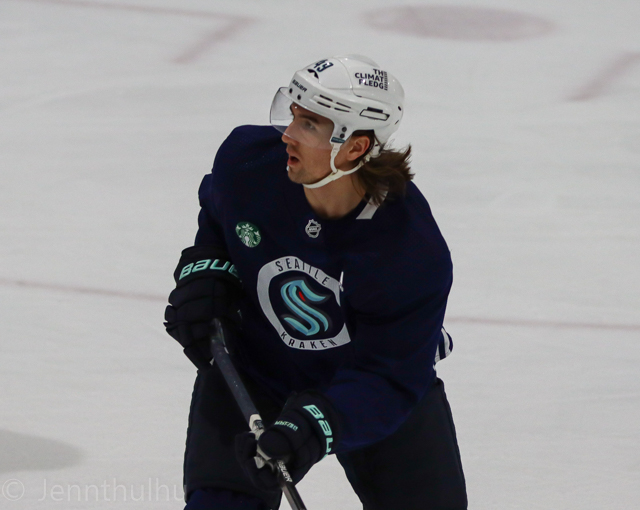
Rask during Seattle Kraken practice in 2022.

On 21 March 2022, Rask was traded by the Wild to the Seattle Kraken for future considerations and was immediately re-assigned to their AHL affiliate, the Charlotte Checkers. Upon joining the organization, head coach Dave Hakstol stated that he expected Rask to fit into a winger role instead of center. He was called up from Charlotte on 25 March and played on a line with Yanni Gourde and Karson Kuhlman. In his Kraken debut, Rask won one face-off and had a minus-one rating in 14:31 minutes of ice time in a 4–2 loss to the Los Angeles Kings. As the season progressed, his linemates changed and Rask played left wing on the Kraken's third line with Alexander Wennberg and Joonas Donskoi. While playing with this line, Rask maintained a three-game point streak which included a goal and two assists. In his first 10 games with the Kraken, Rask accumulated three goals and three assists. On 21 April, Rask played in his 500th NHL game as the Kraken maintained the franchise's first three-game winning streak with a victory over the Colorado Avalanche.

=== Return to Europe ===
As a free agent from the Kraken, Rask went un-signed over the summer. Unable to garner interest from the NHL, Rask returned to Europe after securing a one-year contract with Swiss club, HC Fribourg-Gottéron of the National League (NL) on 15 October 2022. In the 2022–23 season, Rask made 35 regular season appearances with Fribourg-Gottéron, collecting 8 goals and 18 assists for 26 points. Following a playoff qualifying defeat Rask left Fribourg-Gottéron at the conclusion of his contract on 18 March 2023.

== International career ==
Medal record

Representing Sweden

Ice hockey

World Championships
Gold medal – first place	2017 Germany/France	

World Junior Championships
Gold medal – first place	2012 Canada	
Silver medal – second place	2013 Russia	

IIHF World U18 Championships
Silver medal – second place	2010 Belarus	
Silver medal – second place	2011 Germany	

As a native of Sweden, Rask has represented his home country at both the junior and senior levels. His first international tournaments with Team Sweden were during the 2010 World U-17 Hockey Challenge and 2010 IIHF World U18 Championships in Belarus. During the U18 tournament, Rask tallied five points in six games while recording a plus-6 rating to lead Sweden to a silver medal.

== Personal life ==
His older sister, Fanny Rask, played ice hockey professionally for 13 years in the SDHL, scoring over 300 points, and appeared in two Olympic Games for the Swedish national team.

Rask comes from a family of hockey players. His uncle, Peter Emanuelsson, briefly coached in the Hockeytvåan and his cousins, Kasper and Simon Emanuelsson, played in lower-level elite leagues. Rask is of no relation to Finnish goaltender Tuukka Rask.

== Career statistics ==
=== Regular season and playoffs ===
			Regular season					Playoffs
Season	Team	League	GP	G	A	Pts	PIM	GP	G	A	Pts	PIM
2008–09	Leksands IF	J18	14	6	4	10	4	—	—	—	—	—
2008–09	Leksands IF	J18 Allsv	12	3	2	5	4	—	—	—	—	—
2009–10	Leksands IF	J18	4	4	1	5	2	—	—	—	—	—
2009–10	Leksands IF	J18 Allsv	6	2	2	4	2	—	—	—	—	—
2009–10	Leksands IF	J20	39	22	19	41	35	5	3	2	5	2
2009–10	Leksands IF	Allsv	8	0	0	0	0	—	—	—	—	—
2010–11	Leksands IF	J18 Allsv	4	4	4	8	0	6	3	2	5	6
2010–11	Leksands IF	J20	13	3	9	12	2	—	—	—	—	—
2010–11	Leksands IF	Allsv	37	5	6	11	8	—	—	—	—	—
2011–12	Calgary Hitmen	WHL	64	33	30	63	21	—	—	—	—	—
2012–13	Charlotte Checkers	AHL	10	1	4	5	0	—	—	—	—	—
2012–13	Calgary Hitmen	WHL	37	14	27	41	16	17	6	10	16	10
2013–14	Charlotte Checkers	AHL	76	16	23	39	20	—	—	—	—	—
2014–15	Carolina Hurricanes	NHL	80	11	22	33	16	—	—	—	—	—
2015–16	Carolina Hurricanes	NHL	80	21	27	48	24	—	—	—	—	—
2016–17	Carolina Hurricanes	NHL	82	16	29	45	16	—	—	—	—	—
2017–18	Carolina Hurricanes	NHL	71	14	17	31	12	—	—	—	—	—
2018–19	Carolina Hurricanes	NHL	26	1	5	6	4	—	—	—	—	—
2018–19	Minnesota Wild	NHL	23	2	1	3	4	—	—	—	—	—
2019–20	Minnesota Wild	NHL	43	5	8	13	6	—	—	—	—	—
2020–21	Minnesota Wild	NHL	54	10	13	23	2	7	0	0	0	0
2021–22	Minnesota Wild	NHL	29	5	8	13	2	—	—	—	—	—
2021–22	Iowa Wild	AHL	10	2	8	10	2	—	—	—	—	—
2021–22	Seattle Kraken	NHL	18	4	4	8	0	—	—	—	—	—
2022–23	HC Fribourg-Gottéron	NL	35	8	18	26	8	2	0	0	0	0
NHL totals			506	89	134	223	86	7	0	0	0	0

=== International ===
Year	Team	Event	Result	GP	G	A	Pts	PIM
2010	Sweden	U17	3rd place, bronze medalist(s)	6	1	7	8	2
2010	Sweden	WJC18	2nd place, silver medalist(s)	6	3	2	5	0
2011	Sweden	WJC18	2nd place, silver medalist(s)	6	2	3	5	4
2012	Sweden	WJC	1st place, gold medalist(s)	6	0	1	1	6
2013	Sweden	WJC	2nd place, silver medalist(s)	6	2	2	4	4
2015	Sweden	WC	5th	8	3	1	4	4
2017	Sweden	WC	1st place, gold medalist(s)	10	2	5	7	0
Junior totals				30	8	15	23	16
Senior totals				18	5	6	11	4

== Awards and honours ==
Award	Year
Allsvenskan
Most Points by U18 Junior (11)	2011
