= Marcus Vinnerborg =

Swedish professional ice hockey referee

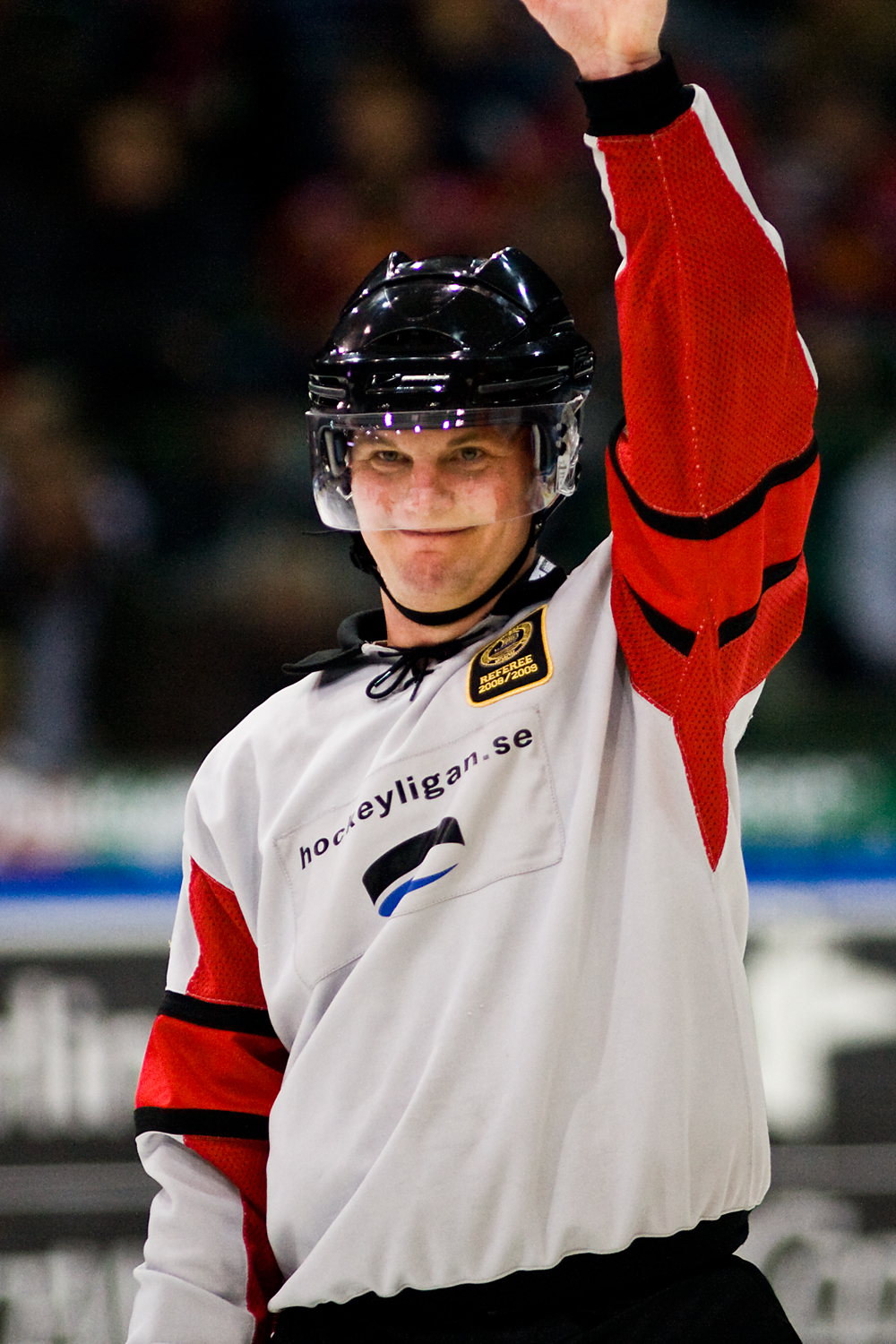
- Marcus Vinnerborg during a Swedish Elite League game in Scandinavium in Göteborg, Sweden between Frölunda HC and HV71 in October 2008.
- Born: 8 August 1972 (age 53); Ljungby, Sweden
- Occupation: Referee
- Years active: 2000–present

Karl Johan Marcus Vinnerborg (born 8 August 1972) is a Swedish professional ice hockey referee, currently working in the Swedish Hockey League—Sweden's premier ice hockey league—and with the International Ice Hockey Federation (IIHF). Vinnerborg has won Guldpipan (English: the gold whistle) three times, awarded to the premier official in Elitserien as voted by the players. Vinnerborg has officiated at seven IIHF sanctioned events, among them four consecutive World Championships between 2006—2009, and at the 2010 Olympics. He has officiated the World Championship gold medal game twice, 2007 in Moscow and 2008 in Québec. In 2010, Vinnerborg made history when he became the first European referee to officiate in the National Hockey League (NHL).

== Officiating career ==
Vinnerborg played hockey for IF Troja/Ljungby, and in 1986, he represented Småland in TV-pucken. He began his officiating career at minor hockey-level in 1987 after having quit playing ice hockey. He was a linesman at Allsvenskan-level for several years before he decided to take the referee education, in 2000, he became a referee in Elitserien.

In 2006, Vinnerborg officiated at the 2006 World Junior Ice Hockey Championships in Vancouver, British Columbia, Canada, where he was selected as the referee for the bronze medal game between Finland and USA. He was then selected to officiate at the 2006 Men's World Ice Hockey Championships in Riga, Latvia, where he officiated until the semifinals started.

Vinnerborg and Thomas Andersson became Elitserien's first professional referees prior to the 2006–07 season. He was again selected to go the World Championship in 2007, and he was selected to officiate the final between Canada and Finland.

Vinnerborg together with Brent Reiber officiated the 2008 IIHF European Champions Cup final between HC Sparta Prague and Metallurg Magnitogorsk, the tournament was one of three trials of the four-man official system which later was introduced at the Ice Hockey World Championships. Vinnerborg was awarded Guldpipan as Elitserien's premier referee during the 2007–08 season, as voted by the player. After receiving the award prior to game three of the 2008 Swedish Championship final between Linköping HC and HV71, Vinnerborg faced controversy after making a critical error when not awarding a penalty to Linköping HC, after HV71's defenceman Johan Åkerman had intentionally shot a broken stick at the puck while being shorthanded. Linköping lost the game and Vinnerborg was not chosen to officiate the next game, Linköping's coach Janne Karlsson criticised the league since the four-man official system was not in use during the finals. For the third consecutive year Vinnerborg was selected to officiate at the World Championship, in 2008 held in Canada on NHL-sized rinks. Vinnerborg and fellow Swede Christer Lärking were selected to officiate the gold medal game between Russia and Canada, making it Vinnerborg's second consecutive final appearance. They stood for a controversial but correct puck out penalty on Canada's Rick Nash in overtime, which led to Ilya Kovalchuk scoring the championship winning goal on the man advantage that followed.

Vinnerborg suffered an injury to his neck and head after a collision with HV71's Mattias Tedenby during a pre-season game in 2008, which led to him missing the start of the 2008–09 season. On 30 September 2008, during a game between hosts SC Bern and the New York Rangers, Vinnerborg and Don Koharski became the first tandem of National Hockey League (NHL) and IIHF referees in an international event.

In May 2010, the NHL announced that Vinnerborg would be joining the NHL's officiating staff for the 2010–11 season, as the first European-trained NHL official. He will primarily be assigned to games in the American Hockey League (AHL) with some work at the NHL level. "His knowledge of the North American game and his work ethic and professionalism will make him a positive addition to the NHL staff," said league director of officials Terry Gregson. He worked his first game in the NHL on November 16, 2010, a 2–1 win for the Dallas Stars over the visiting Anaheim Ducks.

== Personal life ==
Vinnerborg lives in Ljungby with his wife Anna and their twin daughters Amanda and Vilma. He worked as a high school teacher in English and German before his career as a full-time professional referee.
