= Tyson Barrie =

Canadian ice hockey player (born 1991)

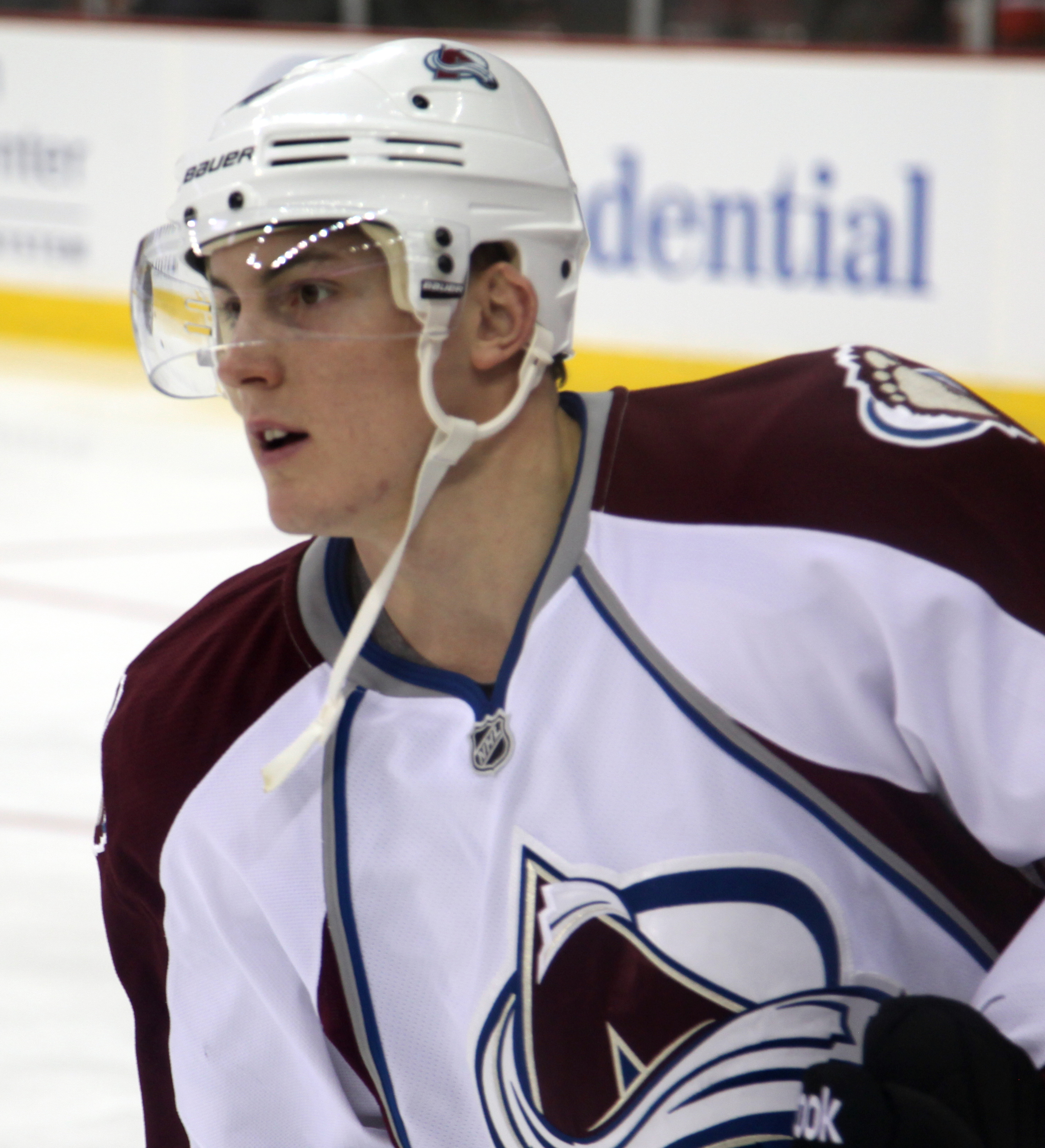
- Barrie with the Colorado Avalanche in 2014
- Born: July 26, 1991 (age 35) Victoria, British Columbia, Canada
- Height: 5 ft 11 in (180 cm)
- Weight: 197 lb (89 kg; 14 st 1 lb)
- Position: Defence
- Shot: Right
- Played for: Colorado Avalanche; Toronto Maple Leafs; Edmonton Oilers; Nashville Predators; Calgary Flames
- National team: Canada
- NHL draft: 64th overall, 2009; Colorado Avalanche
- Playing career: 2011–2025

Tyson Barrie (born July 26, 1991) is a Canadian former professional ice hockey defenceman and current Vancouver Canucks analyst for Sportsnet. He played in the National Hockey League (NHL) for the Colorado Avalanche, Toronto Maple Leafs, Edmonton Oilers, Nashville Predators, and Calgary Flames. He was drafted by the Avalanche in the third round, 64th overall, of the 2009 NHL entry draft.

== Early life ==
Barrie was born on July 26, 1991, in Victoria, British Columbia, Canada, to parents Kristy and Len Barrie. His father Len is a former NHL player and Tampa Bay Lightning co-owner. He also has a sister named Victoria. As a result of his father's job, Barrie lived in Florida for a while growing up and interacted with many of the players, including former Panthers player Peter Worrell who would throw him into a laundry machine as a prank. Barrie began his minor hockey career in Long Beach, California and continued it when the family moved to Victoria.

== Playing career ==
=== Junior ===
Growing up, Barrie attended elementary school in Colwood, British Columbia while also playing in the Vancouver Island Amateur Hockey Association (VIAHA) Midget A1 league with the Juan de Fuca Grizzlies Minor Hockey Association. He then began his major junior career in the Western Hockey League (WHL) with the Kelowna Rockets towards the end of the 2006–07 season.

As a 16-year-old, Barrie began his rookie season with the Rockets in 2007–08. Barrie showed early potential as an offensive presence on the blueline, leading team defencemen with 9 goals, 34 assists, and 43 points. His debut season coincided with the club's resurgence from the bottom of the B.C. Division to second place with a seven-game series first-round playoff appearance in which he contributed with four points. At year's end, Barrie's impressive rookie season was recognized with a selection to the CHL All-Rookie Team.

Barrie improved upon his first full-season success to again lead all Rockets defencemen with 12 goals and 52 points in the 2008–09 regular season. He contributed 18 playoff points in 22 games, including scoring the championship-clinching overtime goal in game six against the Calgary Hitmen to help the Rockets capture the WHL's Ed Chynoweth Cup. Following a Memorial Cup appearance with the Rockets, he featured in the 2009 CHL Top Prospects Game.

In his first year of eligibility into the NHL, Barrie was drafted by the Colorado Avalanche in the third round, 64th overall, of the 2009 NHL entry draft. Being returned to juniors by Colorado, Barrie was named an alternate captain for the Rockets for the 2009–10 season. He suffered an early injury in his third season, ruling him out of the line-up for a month before returning to score at over a point-per-game average to impressively co-lead all WHL defencemen in scoring with 72 points in 63 games. As a result, Barrie was selected to the WHL Western Conference First-All-Star Team, and the CHL Second All-Star Team and was awarded the Bill Hunter Memorial Trophy as the WHL's Defenceman of the Year.

On September 23, 2010, Barrie was announced as the Rockets' captain for the 2010–11 season. With the focus to improve his all-round game, Barrie dropped his offensive output from his previous season, however still led all Rockets defencemen in scoring with 58 points in 54 games. He was again selected to the Western Conference First All-Star Team and finished as the runner-up to fellow Avalanche draft pick Stefan Elliott in voting for the Bill Hunter Trophy. On March 25, 2011, Barrie signalled the end of his junior career after he signed a three-year, entry-level contract with Colorado. He completed his tenure with the Kelowna Rockets to finish as the club's highest-scoring defenceman in history with 228 points in 256 games.

=== Professional ===
==== Colorado Avalanche ====
After attending his third Avalanche training camp, Barrie made his professional debut in the 2011–12 season, assigned to the Avalanche's American Hockey League (AHL) affiliate, the Lake Erie Monsters. As a defenceman, he impressively led the Monsters in scoring at the season's midpoint and was selected in the AHL All-Star Game, scoring a goal and helping the Western Conference to victory. Shortly after, on February 4, 2012, he received his first NHL call-up by the Avalanche. He made his NHL debut three days later on February 7 in a 5–2 victory over the Chicago Blackhawks at the Pepsi Center. He appeared in four games before he was returned to the Monsters. He was later recalled to finish the season with ten scoreless games for the Avalanche before he finished the season with the Monsters, leading the club in scoring with 32 points in 49 games.

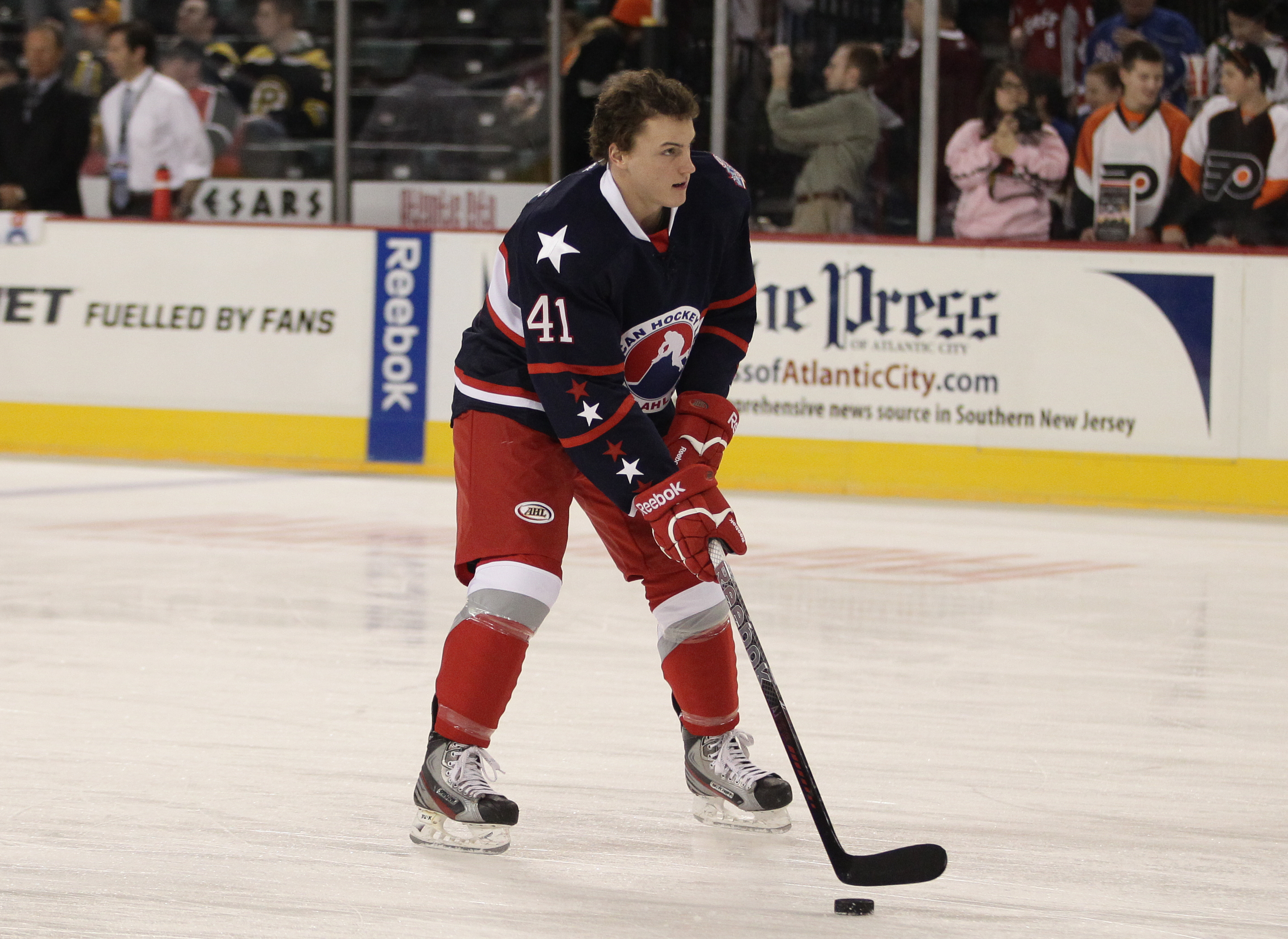
Barrie at the 2012 AHL All-Star Classic.

With the 2012–13 NHL lockout in effect, Barrie began the 2012–13 season with Lake Erie. As the Monsters' leading offensive defenceman, Barrie was recalled by the Avalanche on January 11, 2013, and made the team's opening night roster for the shortened season. In his fifth game of the season, a 4–3 shootout victory over the Minnesota Wild on February 14, Barrie registered his first point, an assist, on a goal by Milan Hejduk. He scored his first NHL goal four days later in a 6–5 victory over the Nashville Predators. After a brief return to the AHL, Barrie established himself within the top-six on the Avalanche defence. On March 30, 2013, in another game against the Predators, he became the first Avalanche rookie defenceman to score an overtime winner. Despite missing the 2013 Stanley Cup playoffs, Barrie led all Colorado players in average ice-time and also the defence in scoring with 2 goals, 11 assists and 13 points in 32 games.

In the final year of his rookie contract, Barrie opened the 2013–14 season under new Avalanche head coach Patrick Roy. After the first month of the season, Barrie was reassigned to the AHL to regain confidence and conditioning. He contributed with three assists in six games with Lake Erie before being recalled to Colorado on November 17, 2013, paying immediate dividends in his first game back with two assists in a 5–1 win against the Chicago Blackhawks. Having secured a role as a top-four defenceman, Barrie broke out offensively to score 13 goals, the highest total for a defenceman since John-Michael Liles seven years prior. Barrie's three overtime goals matched an Avalanche record in a single season (held by David Jones), and he became the Avalanche career leader amongst defencemen in overtime goals with four. Ranking second with 25 assists and 38 points, Barrie helped the Avalanche claim their first division title since 2003. During the 2014 playoffs, after recording two assists in the opening three games, Barrie was the victim of a knee-on-knee hit by Minnesota Wild forward Matt Cooke and missed the remainder of the playoffs with a torn medial collateral ligament (MCL). Cooke was immediately suspended for the remainder of the matchup as the Avalanche failed to recover in losing the series in 7 games.

After becoming a restricted free agent after the 2013–14 season, on September 4, 2014, Barrie signed a new two-year contract with Colorado worth $5.2 million. He returned in full-health to begin the 2014–15 season. Playing primarily alongside Nick Holden, Barrie appeared in a career-high 80 games and finished eighth among league defencemen with 53 points. On reaching 50 points, Barrie became just the fourth defenceman in Avalanche history to achieve the feat, after Sandis Ozoliņš, Rob Blake, and Ray Bourque. His 37 even-strength points tied a franchise record for defencemen held by Steve Duchesne of the Quebec Nordiques. Barrie also led all Avalanche skaters in total ice time during the season with 1,709 minutes. However, Barrie was unable to help Colorado return to the Stanley Cup playoffs.

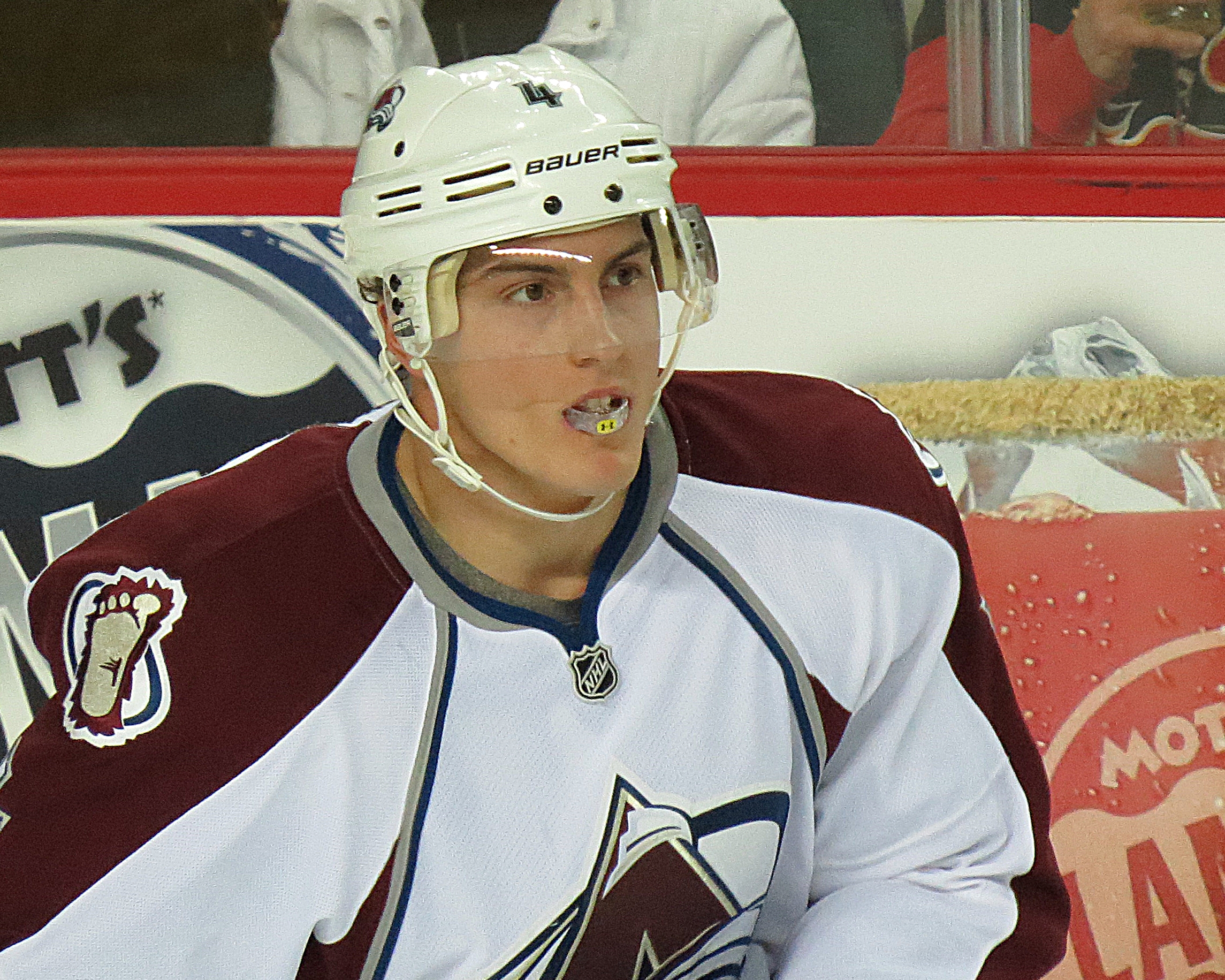
Barrie in 2013.

In the 2015–16 season, Barrie led all Colorado defencemen in scoring with 13 goals and 49 points, also collecting 21 power-play points. In establishing himself as an elite offensive defenceman league-wide, Barrie concluded his second contract in Colorado. As a restricted free agent, and with the Avalanche unable to initially agree to a contract due to concerns about his defensive play, Barrie elected for salary arbitration under the NHL Collective Bargaining Agreement (CBA). He became the only player that season to proceed through salary arbitration. However, on July 31, 2016, while his case was in deliberations, he settled with Colorado and signed a new four-year, $22 million contract with the team.

Barrie began the 2016–17 season on the Avalanche's second defensive pairing. On October 15, 2016, in the opening game of the season (a 6–5 Avalanche win over the Dallas Stars), Barrie scored his 12th career NHL game-winning goal to surpass Sandis Ozoliņš for the most game-winning goals by a defenceman in franchise history. With the Avalanche off to a mediocre start to the season, Barrie continued to lead the offence from the blueline; however, he struggled defensively after he was placed into top-pairing minutes after an injury to top Colorado defenceman Erik Johnson. Barrie made his 300th NHL appearance in a game against the New York Rangers on December 31, 2016. Unable to help the Avalanche avoid their worst season in Denver and a last-place finish in the NHL, Barrie finished the season level with teammate Matt Duchene with a league-worst plus-minus rating of –34. In regressing to 7 goals and 38 points in 74 games, Barrie nonetheless led all Colorado defencemen in each offensive category and finished third among all Colorado skaters in points.

In his seventh season with Colorado in the 2017–18, Barrie rebounded with a resurgent Avalanche, establishing himself among the top offensive defencemen in the NHL, achieving a scoring rate second to only Erik Karlsson. He scored his 200th career NHL point in a game against the Chicago Blackhawks on October 28, 2017, becoming the sixth defenceman in franchise history to reach the milestone. He was tied for second among NHL defencemen with 27 points before suffering a broken hand on December 23, 2017, which sidelined him for five weeks. In returning to the lineup, Barrie continued his scoring pace, and on February 20, 2018, he became the first defenceman in franchise history to record five points in one game, doing so in a 5–4 overtime win against the Vancouver Canucks. From February 28 to March 20, he recorded a career-high 11-game point streak, the longest by a defenceman in Avalanche history and the longest by an NHL defenceman for the season. On March 26, in a game against the Vegas Golden Knights, he appeared in his 400th NHL game. For the sixth consecutive season, Barrie led Colorado's defence and set career-highs with 14 goals, 43 assists and 57 points in 68 games. His 57 points were the most by an Avalanche defenceman since Ray Bourque scored 59 points in 2001.

Helping the Avalanche qualify for the 2018 playoffs, Barrie recorded four assists in six games in Colorado's first-round defeat to the Nashville Predators.

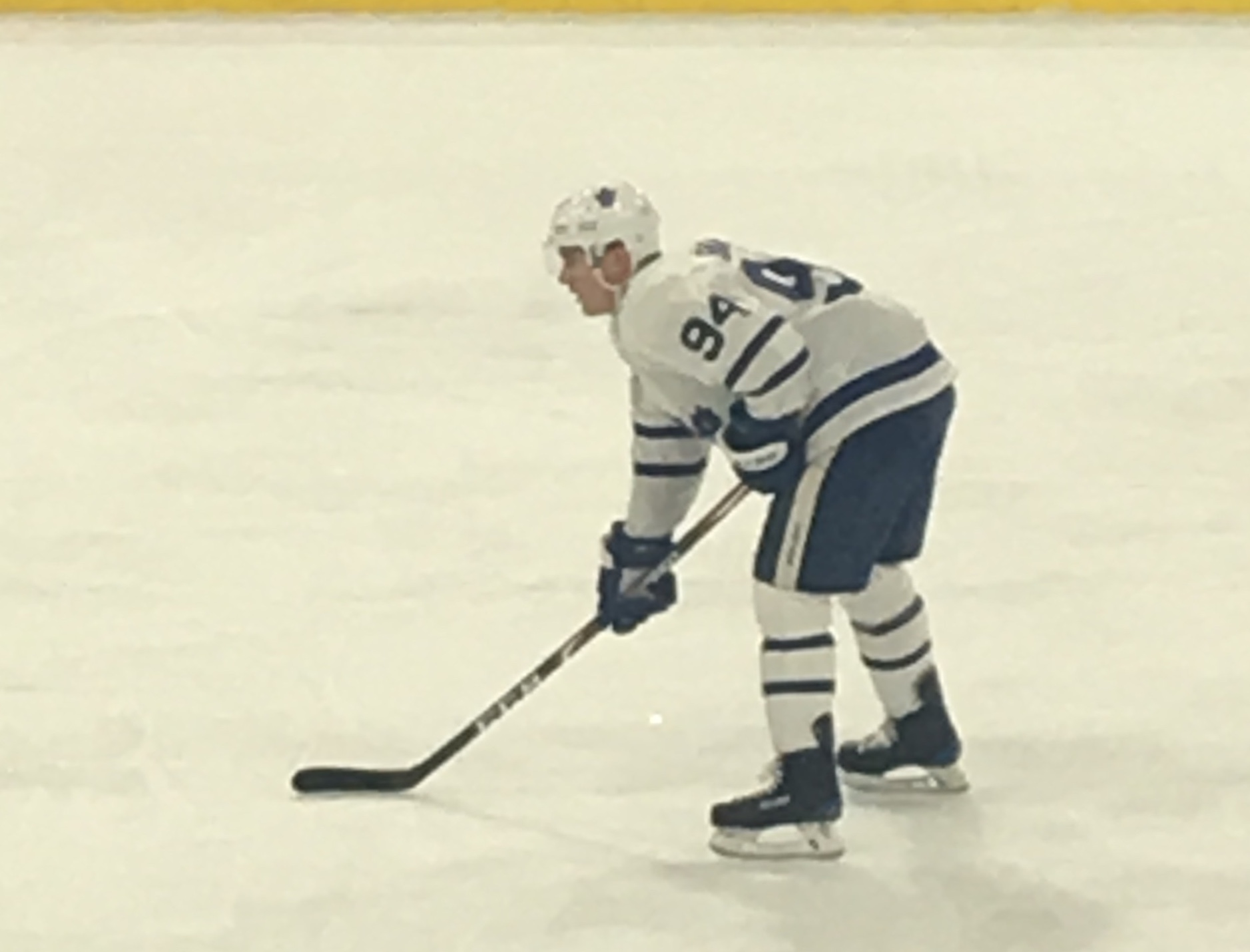
Barrie with the Toronto Maple Leafs in January 2020.

==== Toronto Maple Leafs ====
Following the 2018–19 season, Barrie began to be featured in trade rumours due to the emergence of young Avalanche defencemen Sam Girard, Cale Makar and Bowen Byram, the latter of which was drafted at the 2019 NHL entry draft. Additionally, there was belief that the team would be unable to sign Barrie to a new contract upon the expiration of his existing contract at the end of the 2019–20 season. On July 1, 2019, Barrie was traded to the Toronto Maple Leafs (along with Alexander Kerfoot and a sixth-round pick in the 2020 NHL entry draft) in exchange for Nazem Kadri, Calle Rosén and a third-round draft pick in 2020. Colorado also retained 50% of Barrie's cap hit as part of the trade. Upon arriving in Toronto and Colorado, Barrie and Kadri lived in each other's houses, respectively, as they transitioned onto their new teams.

Barrie struggled mightily under Maple Leafs coach Mike Babcock's system, which paired Barrie with Jake Muzzin and limited his offensive opportunities. Following a team coaching change to Sheldon Keefe in late November, Barrie displayed noticeable improvement both statistically and with his on-ice performance; under Keefe, Barrie played at a 55 point pace, which would have been the third best offensive total of his professional career. Despite this marked improvement, the team felt that Barrie's defensive deficiencies outweighed the offensive contributions, and Barrie was not offered a contract extension.

==== Edmonton Oilers ====
On October 10, 2020, Barrie signed as a free agent to a one-year, $3.75 million contract with the Edmonton Oilers. During the season, Barrie excelled offensively, scoring 48 points to lead all NHL defencemen, but his defensive deficiencies continued; despite leading defenceman in scoring, he did not receive a single vote for the James Norris Memorial Trophy, the first time this occurred in league history.

The following season, Barrie was resigned by the team to a three-year, $13.5 million contract on July 28, 2021, the opening day of free agency. In the course of the regular season, he achieved notable results running the Oilers' power play, but was faulted by some commentators for his work on the penalty kill. After the Oilers qualified to the 2022 Stanley Cup playoffs, Barrie participated in the team's deep run to the Western Conference Final, before they were ousted by the Colorado Avalanche.

==== Nashville Predators ====
During the 2022–23 season, on 28 February 2023, Barrie, along with Reid Schaefer, a 2023 first-round pick and a 2024 fourth-round pick, was traded by the Oilers to the Nashville Predators in exchange for defenceman Mattias Ekholm and a 2023 sixth-round pick.

Leaving the Predators at the conclusion of his contract following the 2023–24 season, Barrie as a free agent went un-signed over the summer. On September 10, 2024, he agreed to attend the Calgary Flames training camp for the 2024–25 season, signing an initial professional tryout contract (PTO).

==== Calgary Flames ====
On October 3, 2024, Barrie signed a 1 year contract with the Calgary Flames worth $1.25 million.

After struggling to produce and stay in the lineup throughout the season, Barrie was placed on waivers on February 20, 2025 and subsequently assigned to the Calgary Wranglers of the AHL the next day after clearing waivers.

Following 14 professional seasons, Barrie announced his retirement on August 24, 2025.

== International play ==
Medal record

Representing Canada

Ice hockey

World Championships
Gold medal – first place	2015 Czech Republic	
Silver medal – second place	2017 Germany/France	

World Junior Championships
Silver medal – second place	2011 United States	

Barrie made his international debut at the 2008 World U-17 Hockey Challenge with Team Canada Pacific. Barrie was first invited to partake in Canada's national junior team development camp in 2010. He was again included to take part in Canada's 2011 national junior team selection camp and was among the final names to make the team. He was among the team's top players during the tournament as Canada won the silver medal following a 5–3 collapse defeat against Russia in the tournament final. Barrie would win gold with Team Canada in the 2015 IIHF World Championship, along with the Colorado Avalanche teammates Matt Duchene, Nathan MacKinnon and Ryan O'Reilly.

Following Colorado's failure to qualify for the 2017 playoffs, Barrie was selected to the initial Canada roster for the 2017 IIHF World Championship held in Germany and France. He was among the tournament leaders with seven points in three games before he was ruled out for the remainder of the tournament after suffering a laceration to his leg while wrestling with a Canada teammate at the team hotel on May 11, 2017.

== Personal life ==
Barrie's grandfather Len Sr. runs a hockey school in British Columbia, which he volunteers at during the offseason.

In 2016, Barrie publicly confirmed his relationship with Emma Rose. They became engaged in 2020 and had their first child, a son, in 2021. The couple married on Vancouver Island in July 2023 and welcomed a daughter in August 2024.

== Career statistics ==
=== Regular season and playoffs ===
			Regular season					Playoffs
Season	Team	League	GP	G	A	Pts	PIM	GP	G	A	Pts	PIM
2006–07	Juan de Fuca Grizzlies	Midget	72	43	87	130	—	—	—	—	—	—
2006–07	Kelowna Rockets	WHL	7	0	3	3	2	—	—	—	—	—
2006–07	Victoria Grizzlies	BCHL	—	—	—	—	—	3	0	2	2	0
2007–08	Kelowna Rockets	WHL	64	9	34	43	32	7	1	3	4	0
2008–09	Kelowna Rockets	WHL	68	12	40	52	31	22	4	14	18	12
2009–10	Kelowna Rockets	WHL	63	19	53	72	31	12	3	8	11	6
2010–11	Kelowna Rockets	WHL	54	11	47	58	34	10	2	9	11	8
2011–12	Lake Erie Monsters	AHL	49	5	27	32	24	—	—	—	—	—
2011–12	Colorado Avalanche	NHL	10	0	0	0	0	—	—	—	—	—
2012–13	Lake Erie Monsters	AHL	38	7	22	29	7	—	—	—	—	—
2012–13	Colorado Avalanche	NHL	32	2	11	13	10	—	—	—	—	—
2013–14	Colorado Avalanche	NHL	64	13	25	38	20	3	0	2	2	0
2013–14	Lake Erie Monsters	AHL	6	0	3	3	0	—	—	—	—	—
2014–15	Colorado Avalanche	NHL	80	12	41	53	26	—	—	—	—	—
2015–16	Colorado Avalanche	NHL	78	13	36	49	31	—	—	—	—	—
2016–17	Colorado Avalanche	NHL	74	7	31	38	18	—	—	—	—	—
2017–18	Colorado Avalanche	NHL	68	14	43	57	22	6	0	4	4	2
2018–19	Colorado Avalanche	NHL	78	14	45	59	36	12	1	7	8	4
2019–20	Toronto Maple Leafs	NHL	70	5	34	39	16	5	0	0	0	2
2020–21	Edmonton Oilers	NHL	56	8	40	48	10	4	0	1	1	0
2021–22	Edmonton Oilers	NHL	73	7	34	41	18	16	1	4	5	10
2022–23	Edmonton Oilers	NHL	61	10	33	43	26	—	—	—	—	—
2022–23	Nashville Predators	NHL	24	3	9	12	10	—	—	—	—	—
2023–24	Nashville Predators	NHL	41	1	14	15	16	1	0	1	1	0
2024–25	Calgary Flames	NHL	13	1	2	3	4	—	—	—	—	—
2024–25	Calgary Wranglers	AHL	11	2	3	5	6	—	—	—	—	—
NHL totals			822	110	398	508	263	47	2	19	21	18

=== International ===
Year	Team	Event	Result	GP	G	A	Pts	PIM
2008	Canada Pacific	U17	4th	6	1	2	3	2
2011	Canada	WJC	2nd place, silver medalist(s)	7	1	2	3	0
2015	Canada	WC	1st place, gold medalist(s)	10	1	5	6	0
2017	Canada	WC	2nd place, silver medalist(s)	3	2	5	7	0
Junior totals				13	2	4	6	2
Senior totals				13	3	10	13	0

== Awards and honours ==
Award	Year	Ref
WHL
CHL All-Rookie Team	2008	
West First All-Star Team	2010, 2011	
Bill Hunter Memorial Trophy	2010	
CHL Second All-Star Team	2010	
AHL
All-Star Game	2012	

== Filmography ==
Year	Title	Notes	Ref.
2020	Justin Bieber: Seasons	Guest Appearance	
