= Vyacheslav Bulanov =

Russian ice hockey referee

Vyacheslav Victorovich Bulanov (Russian: Вячеслав Викторович Буланов; born 3 September 1970, Moscow) is a Russian ice hockey referee active in the Kontinental Hockey League and on international scene.

== Career ==
He is an experienced international referee having officiated in two Winter Olympics and nine World Hockey Championships (eight as a referee). He has officiated over 400 games in the KHL.
