= Jyri Rönn =

Finnish ice hockey referee

Jyri-Petteri Rönn (born 3 April 1971 in Jyväskylä) is a Finnish ice hockey referee, who referees in the SM-liiga and Kontinental Hockey League. He is a real estate agent by profession.

== Career ==
=== World Championship ===
Besides refereeing in the SM-liiga, Rönn has been selected as a referee in the 2007, 2008, 2009, 2011 and 2013 IIHF World Championships. In 2009 he was chosen to referee the gold medal game between Russia and Canada, together with Slovak Peter Ország.

=== Winter Olympics ===
Rönn was also chosen to referee in the men's ice hockey tournament at the 2010 Winter Olympics and the 2014 Winter Olympics. In 2010, he refereed two group matches, a match in the secondary round, as well as a quarterfinal and the semifinal between Slovakia and Canada.
