= 2014 IIHF World Championship =

2014 edition of the IIHF World Championship

Tournament details
- Host country: Belarus
- Venues: 2 (in 1 host city)
- Dates: 9–25 May
- Opened by: Alexander Lukashenko
- Teams: 16

Final positions
- Champions: Russia (5th title)
- Runners-up: Finland
- Third place: Sweden
- Fourth place: Czech Republic

Tournament statistics
- Games played: 64
- Goals scored: 352 (5.5 per game)
- Attendance: 640,044 (10,001 per game)
- Scoring leader(s): (Russia) Viktor Tikhonov (16 points)

Awards
- MVP: (Finland) Pekka Rinne

The 2014 IIHF World Championship was hosted by Belarus in its capital, Minsk, held from 9 to 25 May 2014. Sixteen national teams were competing in two venues, the Minsk-Arena and Chizhovka-Arena. It was the first time Belarus hosted the tournament. The selection of Belarus to host this competition was the subject of much debate, with some politicians in the European Union and North America calling for the IIHF to move the tournament to another country.

Russia with a mix of NHL and KHL stars (unlike other nations, Russia comprised a squad close to their 2014 Olympic squad) remained undefeated throughout the championship. After losing on home-ice to Finland 1–3 earlier that year during the 2014 Sochi Winter Olympics Quarterfinals, the Russians rebounded by capturing the gold medal after defeating Finland 5–2 in the final. Sweden captured the bronze medal with a 3–0 victory over the Czech Republic. Host team Belarus made the playoffs for the first time since 2009, losing to Sweden 3–2 in the quarterfinal. Italy and Kazakhstan were relegated to Division I A. Prior to the championship, Divisions I to III had played their tournaments to establish the rank between teams of lower levels.

The tournament saw a new attendance record for the World Championship, as a total of 640,044 people attended games, surpassing the record set at the 2004 tournament in the Czech Republic, which had 552,097 spectators.

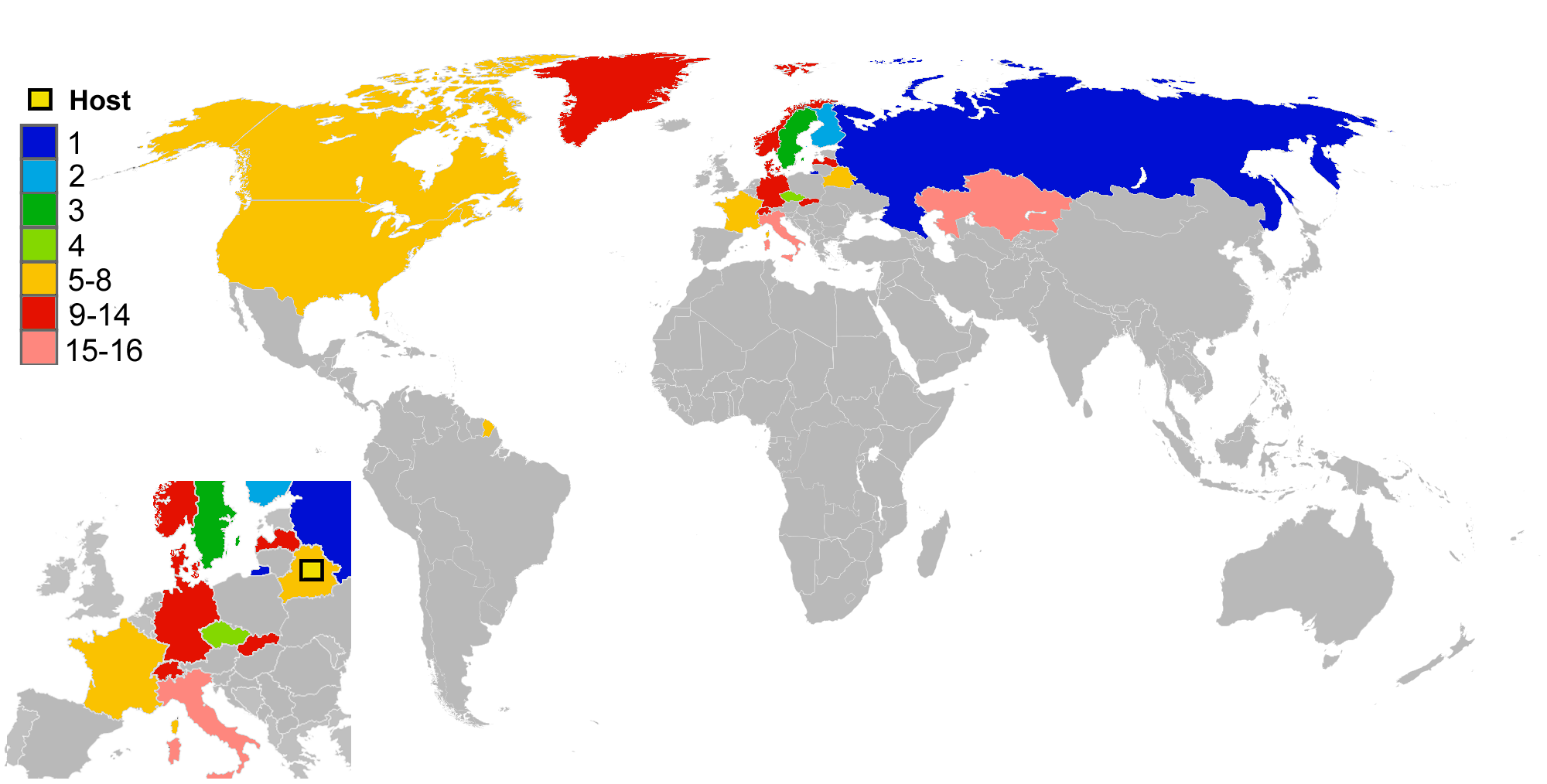
Participants and their results

== Host selection ==
On 8 May 2009 in Bern, Switzerland, the Belarusian bid was successful and got 75 votes in the race for hosting the 2014 IIHF World Championship. The application with the slogan "Welcome to the young hockey country" beat out those from Hungary (24 votes), Latvia (3), and Ukraine (3).

The two main venues listed as hosts for the ice hockey teams were Minsk-Arena (capacity around 15000) and Chizhovka-Arena (capacity around 9600). The larger arena was completed and opened in 2010, whereas the construction of the smaller one was completed in 2012.

On 16 January 2012, President Lukashenko announced that any foreigners who wanted to attend the World Championships would not need a visa to enter Belarus or the medical insurance required for entry. The only documentation required was an original or electronic copy of a ticket to a game.

=== Controversy ===
The selection of Belarus as hosts caused great controversy and initiated the Minsk2014.No Campaign. On 11 April 2011, United States Senator Dick Durbin and Representative Mike Quigley urged the IIHF to move the World Championship to another location, citing concerns over the authoritarian government of Belarus President Alexander Lukashenko. Lukashenko's alleged human rights violations had resulted in numerous sanctions placed on himself and 157 of his associates by the European Union and the United States. Senator Durbin and Representative Quigley were supported by former Slovak ice hockey player and current Member of the European Parliament Peter Šťastný. According to a 2013 report by the U.S. organisation Freedom House, Belarus was the least democratic country in Europe at the time. The European Parliament called the IIHF to move the venue and demanded the release of all political prisoners as a condition to continue the Championship in Minsk. However, the IIHF remarked that its statutes did not allow it to discriminate on political grounds, and spokespersons for the Latvian and Lithuanian ice hockey federations stated that they had no desire for "mixing politics with sports".

== Venues ==
Minsk	Minsk is located in Belarus	Minsk
Minsk-Arena; Capacity: 15,000	Minsk is located in Belarus	Chizhovka-Arena; Capacity: 9,600
Group B, 2 quarterfinals, 2 semifinals, 3rd place match, final	Minsk is located in Belarus	Group A, 2 quarterfinals

== Rosters ==
Each team's roster consists of at least 15 skaters (forwards and defencemen) and two goaltenders, and at most 22 skaters and three goaltenders. All 16 participating nations, through the confirmation of their respective national associations, have to submit a roster by the first IIHF directorate meeting.

== Officials ==
The IIHF selected 16 referees and 16 linesmen to work the 2014 IIHF World Championship. They were the following:

Referees	Linesmen
(Belarus) Maxim Sidorenko; (Czech Republic) Martin Fraňo; (Czech Republic) Antonín Jeřábek; (Czech Republic) Vladimír Šindler; (Finland) Aleksi Rantala; (Finland) Jyri Rönn; (Germany) Lars Brüggemann; (Germany) Daniel Piechaczek; (Russia) Vyacheslav Bulanov; (Russia) Roman Gofman; (Russia) Konstantin Olenin; (Slovenia) Igor Dremelj; (Sweden) Mikael Nord; (Sweden) Marcus Vinnerborg; (United States) Keith Kaval; (United States) Steve Patafie	(Belarus) Ivan Dedyulya; (Canada) Chris Carlson; (Canada) Justin Hull; (Czech Republic) Vit Lederer; (Estonia) Anton Semjonov; (Finland) Masi Puolakka; (Finland) Sakari Suominen; (France) Pierre Dehaen; (Germany) Andre Schrader; (Netherlands) Joep Leermakers; (Norway) Jon Killian; (Russia) Stanislav Raming; (Slovakia) Miroslav Valach; (Sweden) Jimmy Dahmen; (Switzerland) Nicolas Fluri; (United States) Paul Carnathan

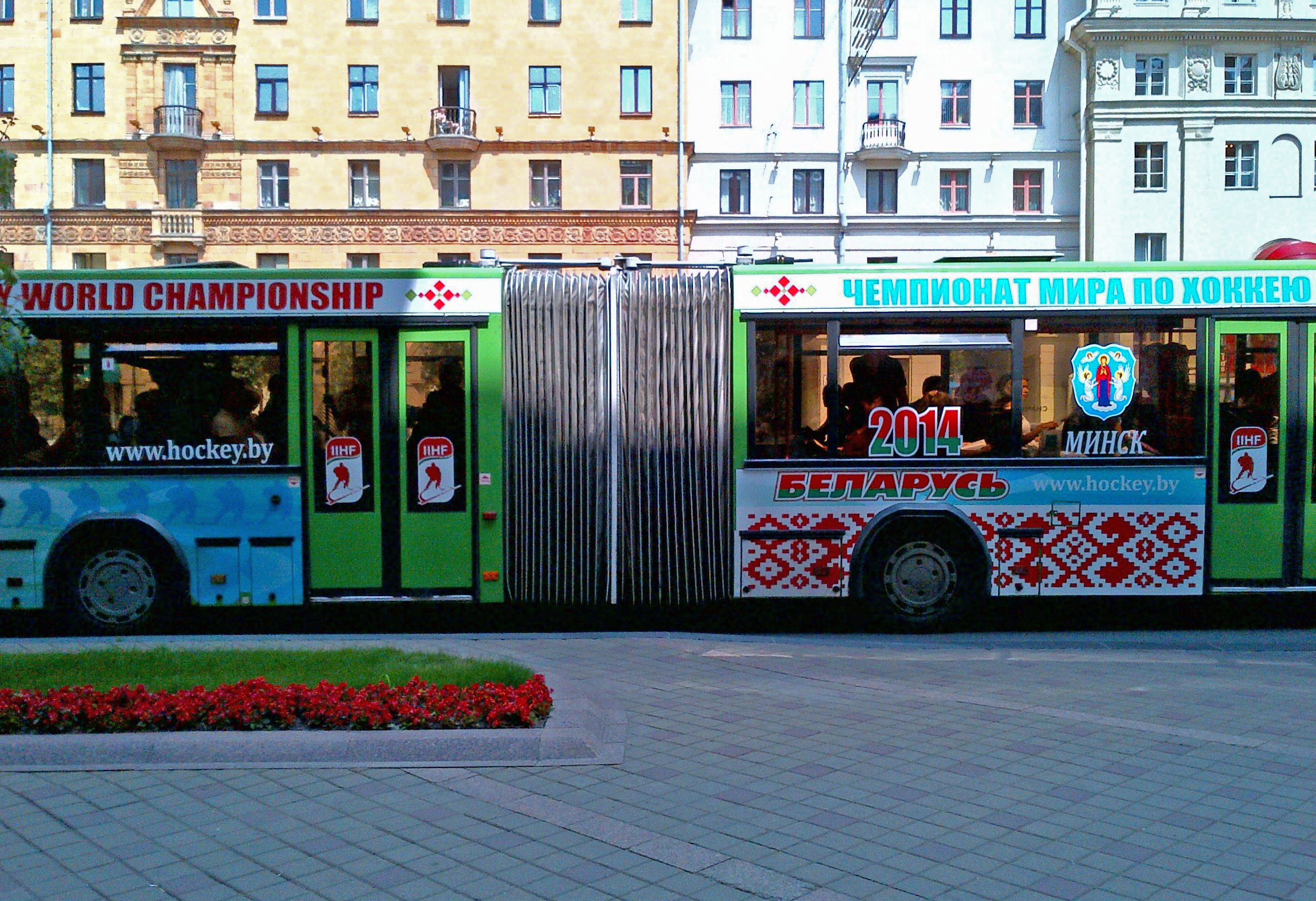
Bus in Minsk in 2012 advertising the 2014 World Championships

== Format ==
Of the 16 teams in the tournament Belarus qualified as host while Kazakhstan and Italy qualified through the 2013 IIHF World Championship Division I, the rest qualified after a top 14 placement at the 2013 IIHF World Championship. (Note: Belarus was also in top 14 in the previous championship, which means that the number of participants adds up to 16 and not 17 as it may sound.) The teams are divided into two groups of which the four best from each will advance to the quarter-finals. Here they will meet cross-over as indicated in the section below.

In the group round, points were awarded as follows: (Note: In group play, overtime was played as 5 minutes of sudden death after a 3-minute intermission. If no goal was scored, the game would go to a shootout (Game Winning Shots). During a quarter-, semi- or bronze final, the sudden death period would be 10 minutes and during the final, it would be 20 minutes; in the latter case, new ice would be laid first. Game Winning Shots procedure was as follows: Three different players from each team would take alternate shots. If the game was still tied after this, one player from each team would take alternating shots until one scored and the other missed. Only the decisive goal counted in the result table for group play.)

- 3 points for a win in regulation time (W)
- 2-point for a team that drew in regulation time but won the following overtime (OTW) or game winning shots (GWS)
- 1 point for a team that drew and lost the above-mentioned competition (OTL)
- 0 points for a team that lost in regulation time (L)

If two or more teams finished with an equal number of points in the same group, their standings were determined by the following tiebreaking formula: (Note: If not all mutual games had been played yet in an ongoing tournament, the tied teams were ranked in the standings according to the following criteria: lowest number of games, goal difference, goals scored and seeding.)

1. Points in games between the tied teams
2. Goal difference in games between the tied teams
3. Goals scored in games between the tied teams
4. Results against the closest best-ranking team outside the original group of tied teams
5. Results against the next highest ranking team outside the original group of tied teams
6. Tournament seedings

Final ranking: places 1–4 were determined by the medal games. Other places were determined by playoff positioning, group play positioning in the group, number of points, goal difference, goals scored, and tournament seeding. The two lowest ranking teams overall were relegated to Division I A. (Note: The two lowest ranking teams were in practice the loser of each group, which followed from the tie-breaking rules.)

== Seeding and groups ==
The seeding in the preliminary round is based on the 2013 IIHF World Ranking, which ended at the conclusion of the 2013 IIHF World Championship. The teams were grouped according to seeding (in parentheses is the corresponding world ranking).

Group A

- Sweden (1)
- Czech Republic (4)
- Canada (5)
- Slovakia (8)
- Norway (9)
- Denmark (12)
- France (13)
- Italy (18)

Group B

- Finland (2)
- Russia (3)
- United States (6)
- Switzerland (7)
- Germany (10)
- Latvia (11)
- Belarus (14)
- Kazakhstan (16)

== Preliminary round ==
The schedule was released on 5 September 2013.

All times are local (UTC+3).

=== Group A ===
Pos	Team	Pld	W	OTW	OTL	L	GF	GA	GD	Pts	Qualification or relegation
1	Canada	7	5	1	1	0	28	13	+15	18	Advance to playoff round
2	Sweden	7	5	1	1	0	21	10	+11	18	Advance to playoff round
3	Czech Republic	7	2	2	2	1	20	18	+2	12	Advance to playoff round
4	France	7	2	2	1	2	25	20	+5	11	Advance to playoff round
5	Slovakia	7	3	0	1	3	20	21	−1	10	
6	Norway	7	2	0	1	4	16	19	−3	7	
7	Denmark	7	1	1	0	5	17	27	−10	5	
8	Italy (R)	7	1	0	0	6	6	25	−19	3	Relegation to Division I A

Source: IIHF
(R) Relegated

9 May 2014; 16:45	France	3–2 GWS (1–1, 0–0, 1–1) (OT 0–0) (SO: 1–0)	Canada	Chizhovka-Arena, Minsk; Attendance: 6,780

Game reference

Cristobal Huet
Goalies
James Reimer
Referees:
(United States) Keith Kaval
(United States) Steve Patafie
Linesmen:
(Switzerland) Nicolas Fluri
(Germany) Andre Schrader

S. Da Costa (Y. Auvitu, P-É. Bellemare) (PP) – 17:03	1–0
	1–1	19:45 – B. Schenn (C. Hodgson, J. Garrison) (PP)
	1–2	50:42 – E. Gudbranson (N. MacKinnon)
S. Da Costa (A. Roussel) (PP) – 52:35	2–2

J. Desrosiers (miss)
S. Da Costa (miss)
P-É. Bellemare
Shootout
(miss) K. Turris
(miss) S. Monahan
(miss) M. Read
8 min
Penalties
12 min
29
Shots
36

9 May 2014; 20:45	Slovakia	2–3 OT (0–1, 2–0, 0–1) (OT 0–1)	Czech Republic	Chizhovka-Arena, Minsk; Attendance: 6,920

Game reference

Ján Laco
Goalies
Alexander Salák
Referees:
(Russia) Vyacheslav Bulanov
(Germany) Daniel Piechaczek
Linesmen:
(Belarus) Ivan Dedyulya
(Russia) Stanislav Raming

	0–1	06:24 – O. Němec (J. Hudler, R. Červenka)
M. Miklík (T. Tatar) – 25:17	1–1
M. Viedenský (M. Miklík, M. Réway) – 35:45	2–1
	2–2	57:53 – J. Jágr (O. Němec, T. Hertl)
	2–3	61:50 – J. Klepiš (M. Ševc, O. Vitásek)

10 min
Penalties
10 min
16
Shots
33

10 May 2014; 12:45	Italy	0–3 (0–1, 0–1, 0–1)	Norway	Chizhovka-Arena, Minsk; Attendance: 4,200

Game reference

Daniel Bellissimo
Goalies
Lars Haugen
Referees:
(Czech Republic) Martin Fraňo
(Sweden) Marcus Vinnerborg
Linesmen:
(United States) Paul Carnathan
(Canada) Justin Hull

0–1	05:42 – N. Roest (A. Stene)
0–2	31:19 – M. Ask (S. Olden, P-Å. Skrøder)
0–3	53:29 – A. Bastiansen (M. Olimb)

4 min
Penalties
6 min
15
Shots
27

10 May 2014; 16:45	Sweden	3–0 (2–0, 0–0, 1–0)	Denmark	Chizhovka-Arena, Minsk; Attendance: 4,900

Game reference

Anders Nilsson
Goalies
Patrick Galbraith
Referees:
(Germany) Daniel Piechaczek
(Belarus) Maxim Sidorenko
Linesmen:
(Czech Republic) Vit Lederer
(Estonia) Anton Semjonov

M. Backlund (M. Ekholm) – 11:41	1–0
M. Backlund (T. Erixon, J. Lindström) – 19:23	2–0
G. Nyquist – 48:13	3–0

6 min
Penalties
6 min
34
Shots
21

10 May 2014; 20:45	Canada	4–1 (0–0, 1–1, 3–0)	Slovakia	Chizhovka-Arena, Minsk; Attendance: 6,200

Game reference

Ben Scrivens
Goalies
Ján Laco
Referees:
(Sweden) Mikael Nord
(Russia) Konstantin Olenin
Linesmen:
(Finland) Masi Puolakka
(Finland) Sakari Suominen

	0–1	32:24 – K. Sloboda (M. Miklík) (PP)
J. Ward (J. Garrison) – 37:21	1–1
C. Hodgson (J. Garrison, N. Kadri) – 47:07	2–1
K. Bieksa (K. Turris) – 57:56	3–1
J. Ward (A. Burrows, T. Myers) – 58:49	4–1

8 min
Penalties
10 min
28
Shots
24

11 May 2014; 12:45	France	1–2 (0–0, 1–1, 0–1)	Italy	Chizhovka-Arena, Minsk; Attendance: 4,600

Game reference

Cristobal Huet
Goalies
Daniel Bellissimo
Referees:
(Russia) Vyacheslav Bulanov
(Belarus) Maxim Sidorenko
Linesmen:
(Estonia) Anton Semjonov
(Slovakia) Miroslav Valach

L. Meunier (J. Desrosiers) – 30:57	1–0
	1–1	32:53 – G. Scandella (T. Johnson, D. Kostner) (PP)
	1–2	59:02 – M. Gander (D. Tudin, T. Larkin)

8 min
Penalties
14 min
29
Shots
17

11 May 2014; 16:45	Norway	4–3 (1–2, 2–0, 1–1)	Denmark	Chizhovka-Arena, Minsk; Attendance: 4,837

Game reference

Lars Haugen
Goalies
Simon Nielsen
Referees:
(Slovenia) Igor Dremelj
(Finland) Aleksi Rantala
Linesmen:
(United States) Paul Carnathan
(Finland) Masi Puolakka

	0–1	02:35 – M. Poulsen (M. Green) (PP)
	0–2	02:55 – F. Storm (P. Bjorkstrand, E. Kristensen)
J. Holøs (M. Olimb) – 06:30	1–2
K. Olimb (M. Ask) (PP) – 22:39	2–2
P-Å. Skrøder (PS) – 31:29	3–2
M. Trygg (M. Olimb, J. Holøs) (PP) – 52:15	4–2
	4–3	56:27 – J. Hansen (N. Jensen) (PP)

20 min
Penalties
14 min
27
Shots
18

11 May 2014; 20:45	Sweden	4–3 GWS (1–2, 1–1, 1–0) (OT 0–0) (SO: 1–0)	Czech Republic	Chizhovka-Arena, Minsk; Attendance: 6,018

Game reference

Anders Nilsson
Goalies
Alexander Salák
Referees:
(Russia) Roman Gofman
(Russia) Konstantin Olenin
Linesmen:
(Switzerland) Nicolas Fluri
(Germany) Andre Schrader

	0–1	00:08 – T. Hertl (O. Němec, T. Rolinek)
O. Möller (M. Backlund) – 11:26	1–1
	1–2	19:35 – J. Hudler (M. Ševc, J. Kovář) (PP)
	1–3	31:53 – M. Zaťovič (T. Hertl, O. Němec)
O. Möller (J. Ericsson, J. Lindström) (PP) – 36:02	2–3
J. Lindström (M. Nygren, O. Möller) (PP) – 48:40	3–3

M. Backlund (miss)
L. Klasen
J. Lindström
Shootout
(miss) J. Kovář
J. Klepiš
(miss) R. Červenka
12 min
Penalties
10 min
25
Shots
33

12 May 2014; 16:45	Slovakia	3–5 (1–0, 2–1, 0–4)	France	Chizhovka-Arena, Minsk; Attendance: 5,358

Game reference

Ján Laco
Goalies
Cristobal Huet
Referees:
(United States) Keith Kaval
(United States) Steve Patafie
Linesmen:
(Belarus) Ivan Dedyulya
(Switzerland) Nicolas Fluri

L. Nagy (K. Sloboda) (SH) – 15:36	1–0
L. Nagy (M. Šatan) – 23:31	2–0
	2–1	26:23 – B. Amar (J. Desrosiers, T. da Costa) (PP)
M. Šatan (J. Valach, M. Miklík) (PP) – 36:11	3–1
	3–2	50:30 – B. Amar (A. Guttig) (PP2)
	3–3	50:56 − A. Roussel (N. Besch) (PP)
	3–4	56:19 – D. Fleury (T. da Costa, A. Guttig)
	3–5	59:32 – A. Roussel (EN)

14 min
Penalties
10 min
21
Shots
26

12 May 2014; 20:45	Czech Republic	3–4 (1–1, 0–3, 2–0)	Canada	Chizhovka-Arena, Minsk; Attendance: 6,317

Game reference

Jakub Kovář
Alexander Salák
Goalies
James Reimer
Referees:
(Germany) Lars Brüggemann
(Russia) Vyacheslav Bulanov
Linesmen:
(Russia) Stanislav Raming
(Finland) Sakari Suominen

R. Červenka (V. Sobotka, J. Klepiš) – 05:55	1–0
	1–1	09:56 – J. Ward (S. Monahan, J. Huberdeau)
	1–2	23:22 – K. Turris (M. Read, J. Chimera)
	1–3	36:07 – N. MacKinnon (J. Ward, R. Ellis) (PP)
	1–4	36:24 – M. Rielly (K. Bieksa) (PP)
J. Novotný (J. Hudler) – 52:11	2–4
T. Hertl (J. Jágr) (PP) – 53:00	3–4

37 min
Penalties
6 min
34
Shots
20

13 May 2014; 16:45	Italy	1–4 (1–1, 0–2, 0–1)	Denmark	Chizhovka-Arena, Minsk; Attendance: 5,092

Game reference

Daniel Bellissimo
Goalies
Simon Nielsen
Referees:
(Czech Republic) Antonín Jeřábek
(Sweden) Mikael Nord
Linesmen:
(United States) Paul Carnathan
(Sweden) Jimmy Dahmen

	0–1	02:51 – J. Jensen (P. Bjorkstrand, F. Storm)
D. Kostner (G. Scandella) – 12:15	1–1
	1–2	35:50 – J. Hansen (SH)
	1–3	36:19 – E. Kristensen (J. Jakobsen, M. Bødker)
	1–4	57:34 – K. Staal (M. Bødker, P. Larsen)

8 min
Penalties
8 min
13
Shots
31

13 May 2014; 20:45	Norway	1–2 (0–0, 1–1, 0–1)	Sweden	Chizhovka-Arena, Minsk; Attendance: 6,389

Game reference

Steffen Søberg
Goalies
Anders Nilsson
Referees:
(Finland) Jyri Rönn
(Belarus) Maxim Sidorenko
Linesmen:
(Czech Republic) Vit Lederer
(Estonia) Anton Semjonov

S. Olden (P-Å. Skrøder) – 22:47	1–0
	1–1	36:33 – J. Lindström (M. Nygren, O. Möller) (PP)
	1–2	47:18 – L. Klasen (G. Nyquist, T. Erixon)

14 min
Penalties
12 min
14
Shots
35

14 May 2014; 16:45	Czech Republic	2–0 (0–0, 1–0, 1–0)	Italy	Chizhovka-Arena, Minsk; Attendance: 4,160

Game reference
Alexander Salák	Goalies	Daniel Bellissimo	Referees: (Belarus) Maxim Sidorenko (Sweden) Marcus Vinnerborg; Linesmen: (Belarus) Ivan Dedyulya (France) Pierre Dehaen
J. Sekáč (J. Hudler, O. Němec) – 22:53 / 1–0; J. Jágr (R. Červenka) – 55:34 / 2–0			Referees: (Belarus) Maxim Sidorenko (Sweden) Marcus Vinnerborg; Linesmen: (Belarus) Ivan Dedyulya (France) Pierre Dehaen
4 min	Penalties	10 min	Referees: (Belarus) Maxim Sidorenko (Sweden) Marcus Vinnerborg; Linesmen: (Belarus) Ivan Dedyulya (France) Pierre Dehaen
37	Shots	11	Referees: (Belarus) Maxim Sidorenko (Sweden) Marcus Vinnerborg; Linesmen: (Belarus) Ivan Dedyulya (France) Pierre Dehaen

14 May 2014; 20:45	Slovakia	5–2 (2–2, 1–0, 2–0)	Norway	Chizhovka-Arena, Minsk; Attendance: 5,881

Game reference

Ján Laco
Goalies
Lars Haugen
Referees:
(Germany) Lars Brüggemann
(Russia) Roman Gofman
Linesmen:
(Canada) Chris Carlson
(Switzerland) Nicolas Fluri

T. Tatar (I. Švarný, J. Mikúš) – 01:06	1–0
	1–1	05:39 – A. Bonsaksen (A. Stene)
J. Mikúš (M. Miklík, M. Ďaloga) – 09:17	2–1
	2–2	11:07 – M. Ask (K. Olimb, M. Olimb)
L. Nagy (M. Marinčin) – 39:42	3–2
L. Nagy (M. Ďaloga, J. Laco) – 47:47	4–2
M. Miklík (T. Tatar) – 48:33	5–2

8 min
Penalties
8 min
33
Shots
20

15 May 2014; 16:45	Canada	6–1 (1–1, 1–0, 4–0)	Denmark	Chizhovka-Arena, Minsk; Attendance: 7,085

Game reference

Ben Scrivens
Goalies
Patrick Galbraith
Referees:
(Slovenia) Igor Dremelj
(Czech Republic) Vladimír Šindler
Linesmen:
(Finland) Masi Puolakka
(Russia) Stanislav Raming

C. Hodgson (N. Kadri, R. Ellis) – 05:24	1–0
	1–1	09:06 – N. Jensen (M. Madsen, K. Staal)
C. Hodgson – 25:03	2–1
M. Read (K. Turris, J. Chimera) – 41:15	3–1
M. Read (K. Turris, T. Myers) (SH) – 43:08	4–1
J. Huberdeau (M. Rielly, R. Ellis) (EA) – 48:35	5–1
C. Hodgson (J. Garrison, N. Kadri) (PP) – 50:24	6–1

8 min
Penalties
8 min
46
Shots
30

15 May 2014; 20:45	Sweden	2–1 (0–0, 2–0, 0–1)	France	Chizhovka-Arena, Minsk; Attendance: 7,045

Game reference

Anders Nilsson
Goalies
Florian Hardy
Referees:
(Czech Republic) Antonín Jeřábek
(Finland) Aleksi Rantala
Linesmen:
(United States) Paul Carnathan
(Canada) Justin Hull

J. Lundqvist (D. Rasmussen, L. Klasen) – 35:32	1–0
O. Möller (N. Andersén, J. Lindström) – 35:49	2–0
	2–1	44:52 – S. Da Costa

8 min
Penalties
20 min
34
Shots
18

16 May 2014; 16:45	Canada	6–1 (1–0, 4–0, 1–1)	Italy	Chizhovka-Arena, Minsk; Attendance: 5,772

Game reference

James Reimer
Goalies
Daniel Bellissimo
Andreas Bernard
Referees:
(Russia) Roman Gofman
(Germany) Daniel Piechaczek
Linesmen:
(France) Pierre Dehaen
(Russia) Stanislav Raming

J. Ward – 13:07	1–0
C. Hodgson (PP) – 21:39	2–0
J. Chimera (J. Ward, M. Scheifele) – 26:02	3–0
K. Turris (M. Read) (SH) – 29:19	4–0
C. Hodgson (B. Schenn, N. MacKinnon) – 36:15	5–0
	5–1	41:12 – D. Borrelli (G. Scandella, T. Johnson
B. Schenn (J. Huberdeau, N. MacKinnon) – 56:30	6–1

14 min
Penalties
33 min
34
Shots
22

16 May 2014; 20:45	Sweden	3–1 (2–0, 0–1, 1–0)	Slovakia	Chizhovka-Arena, Minsk; Attendance: 7,563

Game reference

Anders Nilsson
Goalies
Ján Laco
Jaroslav Janus
Referees:
(Finland) Jyri Rönn
(Czech Republic) Vladimír Šindler
Linesmen:
(Canada) Chris Carlson
(Netherlands) Joep Leermakers

G. Nyquist (D. Axelsson) (PP) – 10:05	1–0
M. Backlund (J. Lindstrom) (PP) – 19:49	2–0
	2–1	29:12 – M. Marinčin (T. Tatar, M. Réway)
M. Nygren (L. Klasen) – 41:58	3–1

8 min
Penalties
8 min
40
Shots
21

17 May 2014; 12:45	France	5–4 GWS (0–1, 3–1, 1–2) (OT 0–0) (SO: 1–0)	Norway	Chizhovka-Arena, Minsk; Attendance: 6,103

Game reference

Cristobal Huet
Goalies
Lars Haugen
Referees:
(Russia) Konstantin Olenin
(Germany) Daniel Piechaczek
Linesmen:
(Germany) Andre Schrader
(Slovakia) Miroslav Valach

	0–1	11:28 – M. Trygg (K. Olimb, M. Olimb)
	0–2	21:47 – M. Ask (M. Olimb, K. Olimb)
A. Roussel (A. Manavian, P-É. Bellemare) – 37:25	1–2
Y. Treille (Y. Auvitu, J. Desrosiers) – 37:51	2–2
A. Roussel (S. Da Costa, P-É. Bellemare) – 38:16	3–2
	3–3	41:30 – D. Sørvik (M. Ask)
P-É. Bellemare (A. Roussel) – 42:37	4–3
	4–4	45:48 – M. Olimb (K. Olimb)

D. Fleury
P-É. Bellemare (miss)
S. Da Costa
Shootout
K. Olimb
(miss) P-Å. Skrøder
(miss) A. Bastiansen
18 min
Penalties
4 min
36
Shots
28

17 May 2014; 16:45	Denmark	4–3 GWS (1–2, 0–0, 2–1) (OT 0–0) (SO: 1–0)	Czech Republic	Chizhovka-Arena, Minsk; Attendance: 6,892

Game reference

Simon Nielsen
Goalies
Alexander Salák
Referees:
(United States) Keith Kaval
(United States) Steve Patafie
Linesmen:
(Canada) Chris Carlson
(Estonia) Anton Semjonov

	0–1	04:26 – J. Klepiš (J. Jágr, O. Němec) (PP)
	0–2	06:55 – J. Jágr (V. Sobotka) (PP)
S. Lassen (M. Christensen) – 09:56	1–2
	1–3	45:04 – J. Kindl (J. Klepiš, R. Červenka)
J. Jensen (K. Staal, J. Hansen) (PP) – 55:31	2–3
P. Bjorkstrand (J. Hansen, M. Madsen) (EA) – 59:07	3–3

M. Bødker
N. Jensen (miss)
Shootout
(miss) J. Klepiš
(miss) J. Hudler
(miss) J. Jágr
10 min
Penalties
10 min
27
Shots
32

17 May 2014; 20:45	Slovakia	4–1 (1–0, 2–1, 1–0)	Italy	Chizhovka-Arena, Minsk; Attendance: 5,929

Game reference

Ján Laco
Goalies
Daniel Bellissimo
Referees:
(Russia) Vyacheslav Bulanov
(Sweden) Mikael Nord
Linesmen:
(Canada) Justin Hull
(Finland) Masi Puolakka

M. Ďaloga (K. Sloboda) – 10:08	1–0
M. Viedenský (M. Ďaloga, K. Sloboda) – 23:05	2–0
T. Tatar (M. Miklík) – 34:13	3–0
	3–1	38:26 – A. Egger (V. Rocco)
M. Miklík (T. Tatar, M. Šatan) (PP2) – 48:07	4–1

14 min
Penalties
10 min
53
Shots
20

18 May 2014; 16:45	Canada	3–2 OT (0–1, 2–1, 0–0) (OT 1–0)	Sweden	Chizhovka-Arena, Minsk; Attendance: 8,453

Game reference

Ben Scrivens
Goalies
Anders Nilsson
Referees:
(Russia) Konstantin Olenin
(Finland) Aleksi Rantala
Linesmen:
(Russia) Stanislav Raming
(Finland) Sakari Suominen

	0–1	13:49 – J. Lindström (O. Möller)
	0–2	21:06 – L. Klasen (M. Ekholm, G. Nyquist)
B. Schenn (J. Huberdeau) – 23:52	1–2
K. Bieksa (C. Hodgson, M. Rielly) (PP) – 27:46	2–2
R. Ellis (T. Brouwer, M. Scheifele) – 62:38	3–2

10 min
Penalties
12 min
31
Shots
32

18 May 2014; 20:45	Czech Republic	1–0 (1–0, 0–0, 0–0)	Norway	Chizhovka-Arena, Minsk; Attendance: 7,902

Game reference
Alexander Salák	Goalies	Steffen Søberg	Referees: (Finland) Jyri Rönn (Sweden) Marcus Vinnerborg; Linesmen: (Sweden) Jimmy Dahmen (Estonia) Anton Semjonov
V. Sobotka (T. Hertl, J. Jágr) – 00:39 / 1–0			Referees: (Finland) Jyri Rönn (Sweden) Marcus Vinnerborg; Linesmen: (Sweden) Jimmy Dahmen (Estonia) Anton Semjonov
8 min	Penalties	8 min	Referees: (Finland) Jyri Rönn (Sweden) Marcus Vinnerborg; Linesmen: (Sweden) Jimmy Dahmen (Estonia) Anton Semjonov
39	Shots	21	Referees: (Finland) Jyri Rönn (Sweden) Marcus Vinnerborg; Linesmen: (Sweden) Jimmy Dahmen (Estonia) Anton Semjonov

19 May 2014; 16:45	Denmark	2–6 (1–2, 1–0, 0–4)	France	Chizhovka-Arena, Minsk; Attendance: 7,450

Game reference

Simon Nielsen
Goalies
Cristobal Huet
Referees:
(Finland) Aleksi Rantala
(Belarus) Maxim Sidorenko
Linesmen:
(Switzerland) Nicolas Fluri
(Netherlands) Joep Leermakers

	0–1	01:08 – J. Desrosiers (L. Meunier, Y. Treille)
J. B. Jensen (K. Staal, J. Jakobsen) – 15:09	1–1
	1–2	19:23 – A. Roussel (B. Amar, P-É. Bellemare)
K. Staal (J. Jensen, P. Bjorkstrand) – 34:41	2–2
	2–3	49:10 – P-É. Bellemare (A. Roussel, S. Da Costa)
	2–4	50:36 – S. Da Costa (A. Roussel, P-É. Bellemare)
	2–5	52:52 – A. Manavian (A. Roussel, S. Da Costa)
	2–6	55:09 – S. Da Costa

8 min
Penalties
4 min
33
Shots
29

19 May 2014; 20:45	Italy	1–5 (1–2, 0–2, 0–1)	Sweden	Chizhovka-Arena, Minsk; Attendance: 7,878

Game reference

Daniel Bellissimo
Goalies
Joacim Eriksson
Referees:
(Russia) Roman Gofman
(Czech Republic) Vladimír Šindler
Linesmen:
(United States) Paul Carnathan
(Russia) Stanislav Raming

	0–1	00:48 – G. Nyquist (L. Klasen)
M. Gander (L. Felicetti, D. Tudin) – 10:07	1–1
	1–2	16:32 – M. Ekholm (L. Klasen) (PP)
	1–3	34:24 – G. Nyquist (N. Danielsson, L. Klasen)
	1–4	37:53 – N. Danielsson (M. Ekholm, L. Klasen) (PP)
	1–5	55:55 – J. Ericsson (M. Nygren, O. Möller) (PP)

12 min
Penalties
6 min
11
Shots
40

20 May 2014; 12:45	Norway	2–3 (1–0, 1–2, 0–1)	Canada	Chizhovka-Arena, Minsk; Attendance: 7,487

Game reference

Steffen Søberg
Goalies
James Reimer
Referees:
(Germany) Daniel Piechaczek
(Belarus) Maxim Sidorenko
Linesmen:
(Russia) Stanislav Raming
(Germany) Andre Schrader

A. Bastiansen (PP) – 13:05	1–0
	1–1	23:36 – J. Ward (S. Monahan, R. Ellis) (PP)
M. Hansen (M. Olimb, N. Bryhnisveen) – 32:16	2–1
	2–2	36:25 – M. Scheifele (K. Bieksa, J. Ward)
	2–3	50:43 – J. Ward (J. Huberdeau) (PP)

14 min
Penalties
4 min
16
Shots
42

20 May 2014; 16:45	Denmark	3–4 (0–1, 1–0, 2–3)	Slovakia	Chizhovka-Arena, Minsk; Attendance: 7,251

Game reference

Simon Nielsen
Goalies
Ján Laco
Referees:
(United States) Keith Kaval
(Russia) Konstantin Olenin
Linesmen:
(Czech Republic) Vit Lederer
(Estonia) Anton Semjonov

	0–1	14:41 – T. Tatar (J. Valach)
M. Bødker (M. Green, M. Christensen) (PP) – 21:11	1–1
	1–2	41:31 – M. Miklík (M. Viedenský) (PP2)
M. Green (M. Christensen, S. Lassen) (PP) – 52:53	2–2
	2–3	53:53 – M. Viedenský (M. Miklík, J. Valach) (PP)
	2–4	54:17 – T. Tatar (J. Mikúš)
J. Jensen (J. B. Jensen) – 54:25	3–4

20 min
Penalties
20 min
30
Shots
24

20 May 2014; 20:45	Czech Republic	5–4 OT (1–3, 3–0, 0–1) (OT 1–0)	France	Chizhovka-Arena, Minsk; Attendance: 8,214

Game reference

Alexander Salák
Goalies
Florian Hardy
Referees:
(Slovenia) Igor Dremelj
(Russia) Roman Gofman
Linesmen:
(Canada) Justin Hull
(Finland) Masi Puolakka

	0–1	06:48 – J. Desrosiers (L. Meunier, Y. Treille)
	0–2	17:48 – J. Desrosiers (T. Da Costa) (PP)
	0–3	18:22 – L. Meunier (D. Raux)
V. Sobotka – 19:18	1–3
J. Sekáč (P. Zámorský, J. Kolář) – 24:30	2–3
J. Jágr (M. Jordán, V. Sobotka) – 31:29	3–3
M. Zaťovič (J. Kindl, T. Rolinek) – 32:42	4–3
	4–4	42:36 – A. Roussel (D. Fleury) (PP)
J. Kolář (P. Zámorský, V. Sobotka) – 62:19	5–4

14 min
Penalties
10 min
39
Shots
24

=== Group B ===
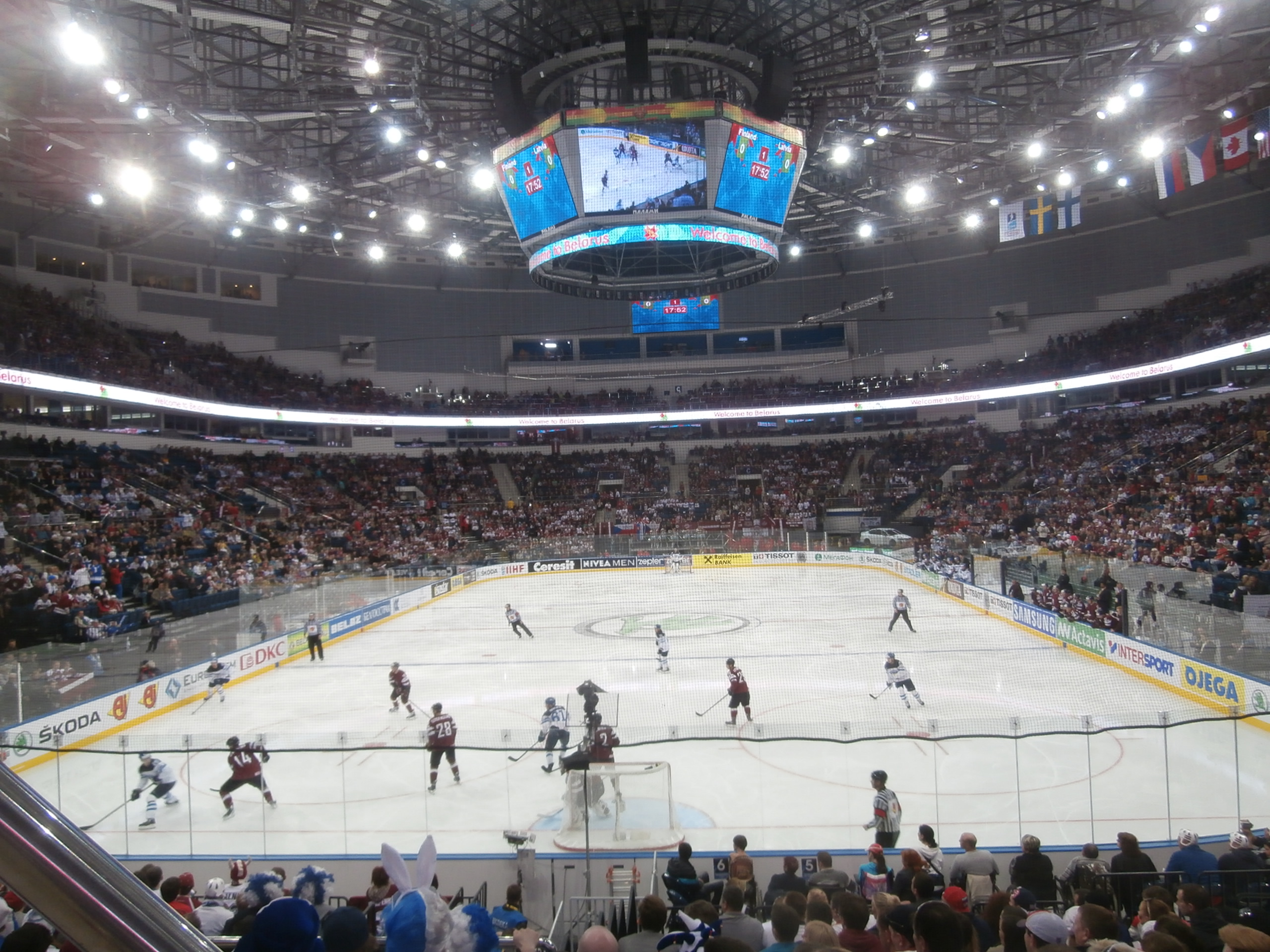
Finland vs Latvia at Minsk-Arena

Pos	Team	Pld	W	OTW	OTL	L	GF	GA	GD	Pts	Qualification or relegation
1	Russia	7	7	0	0	0	31	7	+24	21	Advance to playoff round
2	United States	7	4	1	0	2	27	23	+4	14	Advance to playoff round
3	Belarus (H)	7	4	0	0	3	18	17	+1	12	Advance to playoff round
4	Finland	7	3	1	0	3	18	15	+3	11	Advance to playoff round
5	Switzerland	7	3	0	1	3	19	21	−2	10	
6	Latvia	7	3	0	0	4	20	24	−4	9	
7	Germany	7	1	1	0	5	13	23	−10	5	
8	Kazakhstan (R)	7	0	0	2	5	16	32	−16	2	Relegation to Division I A

Source: IIHF
(H) Host; (R) Relegated

9 May 2014; 16:45	Switzerland	0–5 (0–3, 0–1, 0–1)	Russia	Minsk-Arena, Minsk; Attendance: 13,300

Game reference

Leonardo Genoni
Goalies
Sergei Bobrovsky
Referees:
(Germany) Lars Brüggemann
(Czech Republic) Antonín Jeřábek
Linesmen:
(Canada) Chris Carlson
(France) Pierre Dehaen

0–1	00:13 – S. Plotnikov (D. Denisov, V. Schipachev)
0–2	06:34 – A. Ovechkin (A. Belov, D. Zaripov) (PP)
0–3	17:15 – V. Schipachev (M. Chudinov)
0–4	29:06 – A. Belov (N. Kulemin, S. Shirokov)
0–5	58:25 – D. Zaripov (A. Ovechkin)

10 min
Penalties
8 min
27
Shots
31

9 May 2014; 20:45	Belarus	1–6 (0–1, 1–3, 0–2)	United States	Minsk-Arena, Minsk; Attendance: 13,600

Game reference

Andrei Mezin
Goalies
Tim Thomas
Referees:
(Czech Republic) Martin Fraňo
(Czech Republic) Vladimír Šindler
Linesmen:
(Norway) Jon Killian
(Finland) Sakari Suominen

	0–1	12:22 – B. Nelson (C. Smith, T. Johnson) (PP)
	0–2	34:59 – J. Trouba (D. DeKeyser)
	0–3	35:55 – J. Gaudreau (J. Petry)
	0–4	37:42 – C. McDonald (J. Hayes)
A. Stepanov (M. Grabovski, A. Kalyuzhny) (PP) – 39:56	1–4
	1–5	54:58 – J. Trouba (J. Gaudreau, T. Johnson) (PP)
	1–6	56:57 – J. Gardiner (J. Gaudreau, K. Hayes) (PP)

14 min
Penalties
6 min
21
Shots
25

10 May 2014; 12:45	Kazakhstan	1–2 GWS (1–1, 0–0, 0–0) (OT 0–0) (SO: 0–1)	Germany	Minsk-Arena, Minsk; Attendance: 12,880

Game reference
Vitali Yeremeyev	Goalies	Rob Zepp	Referees: (Finland) Aleksi Rantala (Czech Republic) Vladimír Šindler; Linesmen: (Sweden) Jimmy Dahmen (Slovakia) Miroslav Valach
A. Gavrilin (F. Polishchuk, K. Dallman) – 10:08 / 1–0; / 1–1 / 18:49 – M. Plachta (T. Ankert, L. Draisaitl)			Referees: (Finland) Aleksi Rantala (Czech Republic) Vladimír Šindler; Linesmen: (Sweden) Jimmy Dahmen (Slovakia) Miroslav Valach
R. Starchenko (miss); N. Antropov (miss); D. Upper	Shootout	A. Barta; (miss) T. Rieder; T. Oppenheimer	Referees: (Finland) Aleksi Rantala (Czech Republic) Vladimír Šindler; Linesmen: (Sweden) Jimmy Dahmen (Slovakia) Miroslav Valach
20 min	Penalties	4 min	Referees: (Finland) Aleksi Rantala (Czech Republic) Vladimír Šindler; Linesmen: (Sweden) Jimmy Dahmen (Slovakia) Miroslav Valach
20	Shots	47	Referees: (Finland) Aleksi Rantala (Czech Republic) Vladimír Šindler; Linesmen: (Sweden) Jimmy Dahmen (Slovakia) Miroslav Valach

10 May 2014; 16:45	Finland	2–3 (1–1, 1–0, 0–2)	Latvia	Minsk-Arena, Minsk; Attendance: 11,700

Game reference

Pekka Rinne
Goalies
Edgars Masaļskis
Referees:
(Slovenia) Igor Dremelj
(Czech Republic) Antonín Jeřábek
Linesmen:
(Belarus) Ivan Dedyulya
(Netherlands) Joep Leermakers

M. Salomäki – 04:30	1–0
	1–1	06:18 – K. Daugaviņš (M. Rēdlihs)
P. Kontiola (J. Hietanen) (PP) – 31:42	2–1
	2–2	47:48 – K. Sotnieks (G. Pujacs, M. Indrašis) (PP)
	2–3	52:22 – A. Kulda (PP)

18 min
Penalties
12 min
24
Shots
26

10 May 2014; 20:45	United States	3–2 (0–0, 1–2, 2–0)	Switzerland	Minsk-Arena, Minsk; Attendance: 11,000

Game reference

Tim Thomas
Goalies
Reto Berra
Referees:
(Russia) Roman Gofman
(Finland) Jyri Rönn
Linesmen:
(Canada) Chris Carlson
(Russia) Stanislav Raming

	0–1	21:28 – D. Hollenstein (K. Fiala)
P. Mueller (T. Stapleton, J. Petry) – 26:15	1–1
	1–2	29:39 – D. Brunner (K. Romy)
C. Smith (B. Nelson, T. Johnson) (PP) – 41:28	2–2
T. Johnson (S. Jones) – 53:15	3–2

14 min
Penalties
12 min
38
Shots
29

11 May 2014; 13:45	Germany	3–2 (1–1, 1–1, 1–0)	Latvia	Minsk-Arena, Minsk; Attendance: 11,200

Game reference

Philipp Grubauer
Goalies
Kristers Gudļevskis
Referees:
(United States) Steve Patafie
(Finland) Jyri Rönn
Linesmen:
(France) Pierre Dehaen
(Norway) Jon Killian

M. Noebels (T. Oppenheimer, F. Hördler) – 12:15	1–0
	1–1	18:35 – G. Pujacs (M. Rēdlihs, R. Ķēniņš) (PP)
F. Mauer (PP) – 20:30	2–1
	2–2	27:15 – M. Rēdlihs (R. Ķēniņš)
T. Oppenheimer (PS) – 55:26	3–2

4 min
Penalties
6 min
33
Shots
21

11 May 2014; 17:30	Belarus	4–1 (0–1, 2–0, 2–0)	Kazakhstan	Minsk-Arena, Minsk; Attendance: 13,734

Game reference

Vitali Koval
Goalies
Vitali Yeremeyev
Referees:
(Germany) Lars Brüggemann
(United States) Keith Kaval
Linesmen:
(Sweden) Jimmy Dahmen
(Netherlands) Joep Leermakers

	0–1	04:12 – A. Gavrilin (A. Vasilchenko)
A. Stepanov (M. Grabovski) (PP) – 22:46	1–1
N. Stasenko (A. Stepanov, R. Graborenko) – 30:08	2–1
S. Kostitsyn (A. Yefimenko, O. Yevenko) (SH) – 41:25	3–1
A. Kalyuzhny (V. Denisov, S. Kostitsyn) (ENG) – 59:56	4–1

12 min
Penalties
12 min
29
Shots
20

11 May 2014; 21:00	Finland	2–4 (1–2, 1–2, 0–0)	Russia	Minsk-Arena, Minsk; Attendance: 13,934

Game reference

Mikko Koskinen
Goalies
Sergei Bobrovsky
Referees:
(Sweden) Mikael Nord
(Sweden) Marcus Vinnerborg
Linesmen:
(Canada) Justin Hull
(Czech Republic) Vit Lederer

	0–1	01:39 – V. Tikhonov (A. Belov, S. Kalinin)
	0–2	04:38 – A. Ovechkin (D. Zaripov, D. Orlov) (PP2)
J. Hietanen (P. Kontiola, J. Lehterä) (PP) – 09:13	1–2
	1–3	22:42 – N. Kulemin (SH)
	1–4	34:40 – S. Kalinin (D. Zaripov, V. Tikhonov)
J. Karalahti (O. Jokinen, V. Lajunen) (PP) – 39:08	2–4

22 min
Penalties
14 min
36
Shots
26

12 May 2014; 16:45	Switzerland	3–4 (2–1, 0–1, 1–2)	Belarus	Minsk-Arena, Minsk; Attendance: 13,207

Game reference

Reto Berra
Goalies
Vitali Koval
Referees:
(Czech Republic) Martin Fraňo
(Germany) Daniel Piechaczek
Linesmen:
(Norway) Jon Killian
(Germany) Andre Schrader

	0–1	05:32 – S. Kostitsyn (SH)
Y. Weber (D. Brunner, R. Josi) (PP) – 06:13	1–1
R. Schäppi (SH) – 17:41	2–1
	2–2	23:06 – A. Stas (D. Korobov, G. Platt)
E. Froidevaux (M. Seger) – 43:59	3–2
	3–3	49:49 – S. Kostitsyn (A. Kalyuzhny, M. Grabovski)
	3–4	57:54 – M. Grabovski

10 min
Penalties
8 min
31
Shots
23

12 May 2014; 20:45	Russia	6−1 (2−0, 4−1, 0−0)	United States	Minsk-Arena, Minsk; Attendance: 14,124

Game reference

Andrei Vasilevskiy
Goalies
Tim Thomas
David Leggio
Referees:
(Czech Republic) Antonín Jeřábek
(Czech Republic) Vladimír Šindler
Linesmen:
(Canada) Chris Carlson
(France) Pierre Dehaen

N. Kulemin (Y. Medvedev, A. Anisimov)− 06:06	1−0
A. Ovechkin (PS) − 18:47	2−0
V. Tikhonov (A. Ovechkin, S. Plotnikov) − 20:20	3−0
	3−1	20:57 − J. Abdelkader (J. Petry)
E. Kuznetsov (E. Dadonov) − 29:07	4−1
S. Plotnikov (V. Tikhonov) − 31:07	5−1
V. Tikhonov (A. Ovechkin) − 39:14	6−1

16 min
Penalties
12 min
23
Shots
40

13 May 2014; 16:45	Germany	0–4 (0–2, 0–2, 0–0)	Finland	Minsk-Arena, Minsk; Attendance: 10,959

Game reference

Rob Zepp
Goalies
Pekka Rinne
Referees:
(Czech Republic) Martin Fraňo
(Russia) Konstantin Olenin
Linesmen:
(Canada) Justin Hull
(Slovakia) Miroslav Valach

0–1	09:33 − P. Kontiola (J. Lehterä)
0–2	14:16 − J. Immonen (V. Lajunen, T. Huhtala)
0–3	31:54 − O. Palola (P. Kontiola)
0–4	32:24 − L. Komarov (J. Karalahti, A. Ohtamaa)

8 min
Penalties
6 min
20
Shots
29

13 May 2014; 20:45	Kazakhstan	4–5 (2–1, 2–3, 0–1)	Latvia	Minsk-Arena, Minsk; Attendance: 10,870

Game reference

Vitali Yeremeyev
Goalies
Edgars Masaļskis
Referees:
(Slovenia) Igor Dremelj
(Sweden) Marcus Vinnerborg
Linesmen:
(Czech Republic) Vit Lederer
(Netherlands) Joep Leermakers

	0–1	01:15 – M. Indrašis (J. Štāls, M. Rēdlihs)
T. Zhailauov (M. Semyonov, V. Krasnoslobodtsev) – 04:43	1–1
E. Rymarev (N. Antropov, R. Savchenko) – 19:45	2–1
	2–2	23:41 – A. Kulda (M. Rēdlihs, R. Ķēniņš)
	2–3	29:51 – A. Kulda (M. Indrašis) (PP)
	2–4	34:07 – M. Redlihs (K. Sotnieks, K. Daugaviņš)
N. Antropov (K. Dallman) (PP2) – 39:11	3–4
E. Blokhin (K. Dallman) (PP) – 39:55	4–4
	4–5	43:22 – J. Štāls (G. Galviņš)

8 min
Penalties
18 min
29
Shots
27

14 May 2014; 16:45	Switzerland	3–2 (1–1, 2–1, 0–0)	Germany	Minsk-Arena, Minsk; Attendance: 11,628

Game reference

Reto Berra
Goalies
Rob Zepp
Referees:
(United States) Steve Patafie
(Finland) Aleksi Rantala
Linesmen:
(Norway) Jon Killian
(Estonia) Anton Semjonov

D. Brunner (R. Josi, Y. Weber) (PP) – 12:17	1–0
	1–1	13:57 – T. Oppenheimer (F. Hördler, K. Hospelt)
D. Hollenstein (R. Josi, L. Cunti) – 32:13	2–1
K. Romy (D. Brunner, S. Moser) – 36:27	3–1
	3–2	38:52 – T. Oppenheimer (S. Akdag, K. Hospelt)

6 min
Penalties
6 min
25
Shots
24

14 May 2014; 20:45	Russia	7–2 (1–0, 3–0, 3–2)	Kazakhstan	Minsk-Arena, Minsk; Attendance: 12,299

Game reference

Sergei Bobrovsky
Goalies
Alexei Ivanov
Referees:
(Germany) Daniel Piechaczek
(Finland) Jyri Rönn
Linesmen:
(Germany) Andre Schrader
(Finland) Sakari Suominen

S. Plotnikov (V. Tikhonov, A. Ovechkin) (PP) – 14:24	1–0
E. Yakovlev (D. Zaripov, A. Belov) (PP) – 22:07	2–0
D. Zaripov (V. Tikhonov, S. Plotnikov) (PP) – 23:26	3–0
N. Kulemin – 31:14	4–0
V. Tikhonov (S. Plotnikov, A. Ovechkin) – 41:05	5–0
	5–1	49:31 – M. Panshin (K. Dallman, N. Antropov)
	5–2	53:33 – A. Spiridonov (E. Blokhin, A. Ivanov)
S. Plotnikov (V. Tikhonov, D. Zaripov) (PP) – 59:17	6–2
A. Burmistrov (E. Kuznetsov, E. Dadonov) – 59:54	7–2

4 min
Penalties
12 min
47
Shots
18

15 May 2014; 16:45	United States	5–6 (1–2, 2–1, 2–3)	Latvia	Minsk-Arena, Minsk; Attendance: 11,814

Game reference

Tim Thomas
Goalies
Kristers Gudļevskis
Referees:
(Russia) Vyacheslav Bulanov
(Russia) Konstantin Olenin
Linesmen:
(Netherlands) Joep Leermakers
(Slovakia) Miroslav Valach

	0–1	15:39 – G. Meija (A. Bērziņš)
C. Smith (J. Gardiner) – 16:39	1–1
	1–2	18:57 – M. Rēdlihs (R. Ķēniņš, K. Daugaviņš)
	1–3	28:08 – A. Ņiživijs (H. Vasiļjevs) (PP)
B. Nelson (S. Jones) (PP) – 28:58	2–3
T. Johnson (C. Smith, J. Trouba) (PP) – 31:00	3–3
	3–4	51:25 – K. Daugaviņš (J. Rēdlihs)
S. Jones (J. Abdelkader) – 53:26	4–4
	4–5	54:35 – Z. Girgensons (G. Meija)
	4–6	57:39 – H. Vasiļjevs (M. Cipulis)
B. Nelson (J. Gaudreau, S. Jones) (EA) – 58:30	5–6

20 min
Penalties
16 min
36
Shots
25

15 May 2014; 20:45	Finland	2–0 (1–0, 0–0, 1–0)	Belarus	Minsk-Arena, Minsk; Attendance: 14,447

Game reference
Pekka Rinne	Goalies	Kevin Lalande	Referees: (Germany) Lars Brüggemann (United States) Keith Kaval; Linesmen: (Sweden) Jimmy Dahmen (Czech Republic) Vit Lederer
P. Kontiola (T. Mäntylä, P. Rinne) – 16:30 / 1–0; P. Kontiola (J. Lehterä, O. Jokinen) (PP, ENG) – 59:44 / 2–0			Referees: (Germany) Lars Brüggemann (United States) Keith Kaval; Linesmen: (Sweden) Jimmy Dahmen (Czech Republic) Vit Lederer
12 min	Penalties	8 min	Referees: (Germany) Lars Brüggemann (United States) Keith Kaval; Linesmen: (Sweden) Jimmy Dahmen (Czech Republic) Vit Lederer
15	Shots	15	Referees: (Germany) Lars Brüggemann (United States) Keith Kaval; Linesmen: (Sweden) Jimmy Dahmen (Czech Republic) Vit Lederer

16 May 2014; 16:45	United States	4–3 OT (1–1, 2–1, 0–1) (OT: 1–0)	Kazakhstan	Minsk-Arena, Minsk; Attendance: 10,779

Game reference

Tim Thomas
Goalies
Alexei Ivanov
Referees:
(Sweden) Mikael Nord
(Belarus) Maxim Sidorenko
Linesmen:
(Switzerland) Nicolas Fluri
(Czech Republic) Vit Lederer

	0–1	14:23 – R. Starchenko (D. Upper, K. Dallman (PP)
C. Smith (B. Nelson, S. Jones) (PP) – 18:38	1–1
	1–2	21:21 – K. Romanov (M. Panshin, A. Lakiza)
S. Jones (C. Smith) (PP) – 23:44	2–2
M. Donovan (J. Gaudreau) – 35:02	3–2
	3–3	53:10 – R. Starchenko (N. Antropov)
S. Jones (D. DeKeyser, J. Gaudreau) – 61:05	4–3

8 min
Penalties
14 min
40
Shots
25

16 May 2014; 20:45	Finland	3–2 GWS (1–0, 1–0, 0–2) (OT: 0–0) (SO: 1–0)	Switzerland	Minsk-Arena, Minsk; Attendance: 12,630

Game reference

Pekka Rinne
Goalies
Reto Berra
Referees:
(Czech Republic) Martin Fraňo
(Czech Republic) Antonín Jeřábek
Linesmen:
(Belarus) Ivan Dedyulya
(Germany) Andre Schrader

T. Kivistö (J. Immonen, M. Salomäki) – 05:14	1–0
O. Jokinen (E. Haula) – 32:26	2–0
	2–1	41:57 – R. Suri (K. Fiala)
	2–2	56:35 – R. Josi (K. Romy, R. Suri)

J. Immonen (miss)
J. Lehterä (miss)
E. Haula (miss)
P. Kontiola (miss)
I. Pakarinen
Shootout
(miss) D. Brunner
(miss) D. Hollenstein
(miss) R. Suri
(miss) K. Fiala
(miss) D. Brunner
2 min
Penalties
4 min
25
Shots
28

17 May 2014; 12:45	Latvia	1–4 (1–3, 0–1, 0–0)	Russia	Minsk-Arena, Minsk; Attendance: 14,427

Game reference

Kristers Gudļevskis
Goalies
Sergei Bobrovsky
Referees:
(Germany) Lars Brüggemann
(Finland) Aleksi Rantala
Linesmen:
(United States) Paul Carnathan
(Norway) Jon Killian

M. Indrašis (J. Štāls) – 07:30	1–0
	1–1	10:55 – V. Tikhonov
	1–2	15:23 – S. Shirokov (Y. Medvedev, V. Tikhonov)
	1–3	18:12 – V. Tikhonov (S. Plotnikov, A. Ovechkin) (PP)
	1–4	28:04 – S. Kalinin (A. Kutuzov)

33 min
Penalties
6 min
15
Shots
43

17 May 2014; 16:45	Belarus	5–2 (1–2, 1–0, 3–0)	Germany	Minsk-Arena, Minsk; Attendance: 14,478

Game reference

Vitali Koval
Kevin Lalande
Goalies
Rob Zepp
Referees:
(Russia) Roman Gofman
(Sweden) Marcus Vinnerborg
Linesmen:
(Sweden) Jimmy Dahmen
(Finland) Sakari Suominen

	0–1	08:04 – K. Hospelt
	0–2	11:53 – A. Barta (F. Schütz, F. Mauer)
A. Stepanov (M. Grabovski, A. Kalyuzhny) (PP) – 15:27	1–2
A. Ugarov (A. Stepanov) – 34:23	2–2
M. Grabovski (S. Kostitsyn, A. Kalyuzhny) – 42:55	3–2
G. Platt (N. Stasenko, A. Stas) – 44:05	4–2
M. Grabovski (S. Kostitsyn) – 49:54	5–2

29 min
Penalties
2 min
16
Shots
19

17 May 2014; 20:45	Switzerland	6–2 (2–0, 2–0, 2–2)	Kazakhstan	Minsk-Arena, Minsk; Attendance: 11,739

Game reference

Reto Berra
Goalies
Vitali Yeremeyev
Alexei Ivanov
Referees:
(Slovenia) Igor Dremelj
(Czech Republic) Martin Fraňo
Linesmen:
(Belarus) Ivan Dedyulya
(France) Pierre Dehaen

D. Kukan (SH) – 09:44	1–0
D. Hollenstein (M. Seger, A. Ambühl) (PP) – 14:06	2–0
Y. Weber (R. Josi) (PP) – 27:22	3–0
A. Ambühl (D. Hollenstein) (PP) – 37:33	4–0
L. Cunti (R. Josi, S. Moser) (PP) – 43:16	5–0
E. Blum (L. Cunti, D. Brunner) – 46:05	6–0
	6–1	50:22 – V. Krasnoslobodtsev (K. Dallman, E. Blokhin) (PP)
	6–2	59:32 – E. Rymarev (V. Krasnoslobodtsev, E. Blokhin) (PP)

12 min
Penalties
45 min
40
Shots
25

18 May 2014; 16:45	United States	3–1 (1–0, 0–0, 2–1)	Finland	Minsk-Arena, Minsk; Attendance: 13,030

Game reference

Tim Thomas
Goalies
Pekka Rinne
Referees:
(Germany) Lars Brüggemann
(Russia) Vyacheslav Bulanov
Linesmen:
(Canada) Justin Hull
(Slovakia) Miroslav Valach

B. Nelson (S. Jones) – 00:19	1–0
T. Johnson (C. Smith, S. Jones) – 46:42	2–0
	2–1	56:46 – T. Mäntylä (J. Immonen, J. Hietanen)
T. Johnson (D. Shore) (ENG) – 59:14	3–1

10 min
Penalties
8 min
24
Shots
23

18 May 2014; 20:45	Russia	3–0 (0–0, 0–0, 3–0)	Germany	Minsk-Arena, Minsk; Attendance: 14,021

Game reference

Andrei Vasilevskiy
Goalies
Philipp Grubauer
Referees:
(Slovenia) Igor Dremelj
(Czech Republic) Vladimír Šindler
Linesmen:
(Czech Republic) Vit Lederer
(Netherlands) Joep Leermakers

V. Shipachyov (E. Yakovlev, S. Plotnikov) (PP) – 43:58	1–0
S. Shirokov (D. Zaripov, A. Anisimov) – 50:10	2–0
V. Tikhonov (A. Anisimov) (ENG) – 59:15	3–0

8 min
Penalties
12 min
31
Shots
27

19 May 2014; 16:45	Kazakhstan	3–4 (2–2, 0–2, 1–0)	Finland	Minsk-Arena, Minsk; Attendance: 12,119

Game reference

Alexei Ivanov
Goalies
Pekka Rinne
Referees:
(Sweden) Mikael Nord
(United States) Steve Patafie
Linesmen:
(France) Pierre Dehaen
(Norway) Jon Killian

	0–1	07:53 – O. Palola (J. Lehterä, L. Komarov) (PP)
E. Rymarev (F. Polishchuk, V. Krasnoslobodtsev) – 14:32	1–1
F. Polishchuk (E. Rymarev, V. Krasnoslobodtsev) (PP) – 15:51	2–1
	2–2	19:18 – J. Lehterä (J. Karalahti)
	2–3	27:24 – O. Jokinen (P. Kontiola, T. Mäntylä) (PP)
	2–4	39:57 – J. Immonen (O. Jokinen, P. Jormakka)
K. Romanov (T. Zhailauov) (PP) – 59:31	3–4

8 min
Penalties
14 min
28
Shots
33

19 May 2014; 20:45	Latvia	1–3 (0–2, 1–0, 0–1)	Belarus	Minsk-Arena, Minsk; Attendance: 14,531

Game reference

Edgars Masaļskis
Goalies
Kevin Lalande
Referees:
(Czech Republic) Antonín Jeřábek
(United States) Keith Kaval
Linesmen:
(Canada) Chris Carlson
(Finland) Masi Puolakka

	0–1	08:07 – G. Platt (R. Graborenko, A. Stas)
	0–2	08:40 – M. Grabovski (A. Kalyuzhny, D. Korobov)
A. Kulda (A. Ņiživijs) (PP2) – 33:49	1–2
	1–3	59:59 – S. Kostitsyn (ENG)

44 min
Penalties
18 min
19
Shots
16

20 May 2014; 12:45	Germany	4–5 (0–0, 3–3, 1–2)	United States	Minsk-Arena, Minsk; Attendance: 11,845

Game reference

Danny aus den Birken
Goalies
Tim Thomas
Referees:
(Russia) Vyacheslav Bulanov
(Czech Republic) Martin Fraňo
Linesmen:
(Switzerland) Nicolas Fluri
(Norway) Jon Killian

	0–1	21:44 – J. Abdelkader (T. Stapleton, J. Gaudreau)
A. Weiss – 23:32	1–1
	1–2	27:18 – D. Shore (J. Petry) (SH)
K. Hospelt (T. Oppenheimer, L. Draisaitl) (PP) – 30:29	2–2
	2–3	32:53 – M. Donovan (J. Gaudreau, J. Gardiner) (PP)
L. Draisaitl (T. Ankert) – 35:13	3–3
	3–4	42:24 – J. Gaudreau (J. Gardiner) (PP)
	3–5	55:44 – J. Abdelkader (J. Gaudreau)
T. Rieder (L. Draisaitl, K. Hospelt) (PP, EA) – 58:03	4–5

8 min
Penalties
14 min
28
Shots
36

20 May 2014; 16:45	Latvia	2–3 (0–2, 1–1, 1–0)	Switzerland	Minsk-Arena, Minsk; Attendance: 12,868

Game reference

Kristers Gudļevskis
Goalies
Reto Berra
Referees:
(Finland) Jyri Rönn
(Sweden) Marcus Vinnerborg
Linesmen:
(Sweden) Jimmy Dahmen
(Slovakia) Miroslav Valach

	0–1	08:39 – D. Brunner (L. Cunti, D. Hollenstein)
	0–2	10:49 – D. Schlumpf (A. Ambühl)
	0–3	20:27 – Y. Weber (R. Josi, A. Ambühl)
K. Jass (A. Džeriņš, A. Kulda) – 21:57	1–3
Z. Girgensons (K. Sotnieks, H. Vasiļjevs) (EA) – 57:37	2–3

8 min
Penalties
12 min
28
Shots
26

20 May 2014; 20:45	Russia	2–1 (0–0, 2–0, 0–1)	Belarus	Minsk-Arena, Minsk; Attendance: 14,679

Game reference

Sergei Bobrovsky
Goalies
Vitali Koval
Kevin Lalande
Referees:
(Sweden) Mikael Nord
(United States) Steve Patafie
Linesmen:
(United States) Paul Carnathan
(Finland) Sakari Suominen

S. Plotnikov (V. Schipachev, V. Tikhonov) (PP) – 32:46	1–0
V. Schipachev (S. Plotnikov) – 35:47	2–0
	2–1	45:49 – V. Denisov (A. Kitarov, D. Korobov)

10 min
Penalties
8 min
27
Shots
20

== Playoff round ==
Quarterfinals
A1	Canada	2
B4	Finland	3
B2	United States	3
A3	Czech Republic	4
B1	Russia	3
A4	France	0
A2	Sweden	3
B3	Belarus	2

Semifinals
A3	Czech Republic	0
B4	Finland	3
B1	Russia	3
A2	Sweden	1

Finals
B1	Russia	5
B4	Finland	2
Bronze medal game
A2	Sweden	3
A3	Czech Republic	0

=== Quarterfinals ===
22 May 2014; 16:00	United States	3–4 (1–1, 0–3, 2–0)	Czech Republic	Chizhovka-Arena, Minsk; Attendance: 8,234

Game reference

Tim Thomas
Goalies
Alexander Salák
Referees:
(Sweden) Mikael Nord
(Sweden) Marcus Vinnerborg
Linesmen:
(Canada) Justin Hull
(Finland) Sakari Suominen

B. Nelson (P. Mueller, S. Jones) (PP) – 06:54	1–0
	1–1	09:25 – T. Rolinek
	1–2	26:51 – T. Hertl (J. Novotný) (PP)
	1–3	28:06 – R. Červenka (P. Zámorský, J. Kolář) (PP)
	1–4	36:19 – O. Němec (J. Novotný, J. Jágr)
T. Johnson (P. Mueller, S. Jones) (EA) – 58:50	2–4
T. Johnson (P. Mueller, C. Smith) (EA) – 59:03	3–4

41 min
Penalties
14 min
34
Shots
33

22 May 2014; 17:00	Russia	3–0 (1–0, 1–0, 1–0)	France	Minsk-Arena, Minsk; Attendance: 14,011

Game reference

Sergei Bobrovsky
Goalies
Cristobal Huet
Referees:
(Czech Republic) Antonín Jeřábek
(United States) Keith Kaval
Linesmen:
(Canada) Chris Carlson
(Czech Republic) Vit Lederer

A. Anisimov (E Yakovlev) – 04:21	1–0
E. Malkin (N. Kulemin, V. Tikhonov) (PP) – 20:52	2–0
A. Kutuzov (N. Kulemin, E. Malkin) – 47:36	3–0

12 min
Penalties
18 min
28
Shots
16

22 May 2014; 20:00	Canada	2–3 (0–1, 2–0, 0–2)	Finland	Chizhovka-Arena, Minsk; Attendance: 8,671

Game reference

Ben Scrivens
Goalies
Pekka Rinne
Referees:
(Germany) Lars Brüggemann
(Russia) Konstantin Olenin
Linesmen:
(United States) Paul Carnathan
(Germany) Andre Schrader

	0–1	06:14 – O. Palola (J. Hietanen, J. Lehterä) (PP)
K. Turris (M. Read) – 25:41	1–1
M. Scheifele – 32:08	2–1
	2–2	40:28 – J. Hietanen (J. Lehterä, P. Kontiola)
	2–3	56:52 – I. Pakarinen (J. Lehterä)

6 min
Penalties
12 min
38
Shots
26

22 May 2014; 21:00	Sweden	3–2 (1–0, 1–2, 1–0)	Belarus	Minsk-Arena, Minsk; Attendance: 14,598

Game reference

Anders Nilsson
Goalies
Kevin Lalande
Referees:
(Russia) Vyacheslav Bulanov
(Finland) Jyri Rönn
Linesmen:
(France) Pierre Dehaen
(Estonia) Anton Semjonov

N. Danielsson (M. Ekholm, L. Klasen) (PP) – 13:41	1–0
	1–1	25:39 – G. Platt (A. Kalyuzhny, O. Yevenko)
	1–2	34:14 – A. Yefimenko (G. Platt)
J. Ericsson (M. Nygren, M. Backlund) (PP) – 37:27	2–2
M. Ekholm – 53:38	3–2

6 min
Penalties
8 min
25
Shots
23

=== Semifinals ===
24 May 2014; 14:45	Russia	3–1 (2–1, 1–0, 0–0)	Sweden	Minsk-Arena, Minsk; Attendance: 14,521

Game reference

Sergei Bobrovsky
Goalies
Anders Nilsson
Referees:
(United States) Keith Kaval
(Czech Republic) Vladimír Šindler
Linesmen:
(Finland) Sakari Suominen
(Slovakia) Miroslav Valach

	0–1	00:19 – O. Möller (J. Lindström, M. Backlund)
S. Plotnikov (Y. Medvedev, V. Shipachyov) – 13:25	1–1
S. Shirokov (D. Zaripov, Y. Medvedev) – 18:00	2–1
A. Belov (D. Zaripov, A. Ovechkin) – 31:02	3–1

10 min
Penalties
37 min
34
Shots
23

24 May 2014; 18:45	Czech Republic	0–3 (0–1, 0–1, 0–1)	Finland	Minsk-Arena, Minsk; Attendance: 14,378

Game reference

Alexander Salák
Goalies
Pekka Rinne
Referees:
(Germany) Lars Brüggemann
(Russia) Vyacheslav Bulanov
Linesmen:
(Sweden) Jimmy Dahmen
(Estonia) Anton Semjonov

0–1	08:57 – J. Lehterä (J. Hietanen, P. Kontiola)
0–2	31:02 – J. Immonen (P. Kontiola, J. Karalahti) (PP)
0–3	59:49 – J. Lehterä (L. Komarov, J. Immonen) (ENG)

10 min
Penalties
6 min
20
Shots
26

=== Bronze medal game ===
25 May 2014; 16:30	Sweden	3–0 (2–0, 0–0, 1–0)	Czech Republic	Minsk-Arena, Minsk; Attendance: 14,001

Game reference

Anders Nilsson
Goalies
Alexander Salák
Referees:
(Russia) Vyacheslav Bulanov
(Finland) Jyri Rönn
Linesmen:
(Finland) Sakari Suominen
(Slovakia) Miroslav Valach

J. Lindström (N. Andersén, O. Möller) – 04:28	1–0
S. Hjalmarsson (M. Ekholm, N. Danielsson) – 15:44	2–0
M. Backlund (E. Gustafsson, J. Lindström) - 48:22	3–0

14 min
Penalties
10 min
24
Shots
29

=== Gold medal game ===
25 May 2014; 21:00	Russia	5–2 (1–1, 2–1, 2–0)	Finland	Minsk-Arena, Minsk; Attendance: 15,112

Game reference

Sergei Bobrovsky
Goalies
Pekka Rinne
Referees:
(Germany) Lars Brüggemann
(United States) Keith Kaval
Linesmen:
(Canada) Chris Carlson
(Germany) Andre Schrader

S. Shirokov (D. Zaripov) (PP) – 10:45	1–0
	1–1	19:57 – I. Pakarinen (J. Lehterä)
	1–2	26:51 – O. Palola (P. Jormakka, J. Lehterä) (PP)
A. Ovechkin (V. Schipachev) – 27:34	2–2
E. Malkin (D. Zaripov) (PP2) – 35:36	3–2
D. Zaripov (S. Shirokov) (PP) – 44:24	4–2
V. Tikhonov (A. Kutuzov, N. Kulemin) (PP) – 55:53	5–2

12 min
Penalties
28 min
39
Shots
26

== Ranking and statistics ==
2014 IIHF World Championship winners

Russia
5th/27th title

=== Tournament Awards ===
- Best players selected by the directorate:
  - Best Goaltender: (Russia) Sergei Bobrovsky
  - Best Defenceman: (United States) Seth Jones
  - Best Forward: (Russia) Viktor Tikhonov
  - Most Valuable Player: (Finland) Pekka Rinne
- Media All-Star Team:
  - Goaltender: (Finland) Pekka Rinne
  - Defence: (Russia) Anton Belov, (United States) Seth Jones
  - Forwards: (Russia) Sergei Plotnikov, (Russia) Viktor Tikhonov, (France) Antoine Roussel

=== Final ranking ===
The official IIHF final ranking of the tournament:

Gold medal	Russia
Silver medal	Finland
Bronze medal	Sweden
4	Czech Republic
5	Canada
6	United States
7	Belarus
8	France
9	Slovakia
10	Switzerland
11	Latvia
12	Norway
13	Denmark
14	Germany
15	Italy
16	Kazakhstan

=== Scoring leaders ===
List shows the top skaters sorted by points, then goals.

Player	GP	G	A	Pts	+/−	PIM	POS
(Russia) Viktor Tikhonov	10	8	8	16	+10	10	F
(Russia) Danis Zaripov	10	3	10	13	+7	6	F
(Russia) Sergei Plotnikov	10	6	6	12	+7	12	F
(Finland) Jori Lehterä	10	3	9	12	+4	10	F
(France) Antoine Roussel	8	6	5	11	+6	16	F
(Sweden) Joakim Lindström	10	5	6	11	+4	4	F
(Slovakia) Michel Miklík	7	4	7	11	+5	0	F
(Russia) Alexander Ovechkin	9	4	7	11	+6	8	F
(United States) Seth Jones	8	2	9	11	+8	6	D
(United States) Johnny Gaudreau	8	2	8	10	+4	2	F

GP = Games played; G = Goals; A = Assists; Pts = Points; +/− = Plus/minus; PIM = Penalties in minutes; POS = Position
Source: IIHF.com

=== Leading goaltenders ===
Only the top ten goaltenders, based on save percentage, who have played at least 40% of their team's minutes, are included in this list.

Player	TOI	GA	GAA	SA	Sv%	SO
(Russia) Sergei Bobrovsky	480:00	9	1.13	181	95.03	2
(Norway) Steffen Søberg	175:45	6	2.05	116	94.83	2
(Belarus) Kevin Lalande	240:37	5	1.25	80	93.75	0
(Sweden) Anders Nilsson	545:11	14	1.54	224	93.75	2
(Canada) Ben Scrivens	241:07	7	1.74	112	93.75	0
(Finland) Pekka Rinne	543:21	17	1.88	237	92.83	3
(Canada) James Reimer	245:00	9	2.20	101	91.09	0
(Italy) Daniel Bellissimo	398:02	23	3.47	238	90.34	0
(France) Cristobal Huet	369:01	16	2.60	163	90.18	0
(Switzerland) Reto Berra	362:45	16	2.65	163	90.18	0

TOI = Time on ice (minutes:seconds); SA = Shots against; GA = Goals against; GAA = Goals against average; Sv% = Save percentage; SO = Shutouts
Source: IIHF.com

== IIHF broadcasting rights ==
Country	Broadcaster
Austria	ORF
Belarus	BTRC
Brazil	SporTV
Bulgaria	Nova Sport
Canada	TSN
Canada	RDS
Croatia	Arena Sport
Czech Republic	Czech Television
Denmark	TV3 Sport 1
Finland	MTV3
France	Sport+
Germany	Sport1
Hungary	Sport 1
Kazakhstan	KazSport TV
Latvia	Viasat
Norway	TV2
Poland	TVP
Russia	C1R
Russia	VGTRK
Slovakia	RTVS
Slovenia	Šport TV
Sweden	TV4
Sweden	TV12
Switzerland	SRG SSR
Ukraine	XSPORT
United Kingdom	Premier Sports
United States	NBC Sports Network

== IIHF honors and awards ==
The 2014 IIHF Hall of Fame induction ceremony has held in Minsk during the World Championships, and Mark Aubry of Canada was given the Paul Loicq Award for outstanding contributions to international ice hockey.

IIHF Hall of Fame inductees

- Vyacheslav Bykov, Russia
- Murray Costello, Canada
- Andrei Khomutov, Russia
- Nicklas Lidström, Sweden
- Ruslan Salei, Belarus
- Steve Yzerman, Canada
