= Bellissimo =

Bellissimo may refer to:

- Bellissimo!, 2016 Todd Smith album
- Lodha Bellissimo, skyscraper in Mumbai, India

== People with the surname ==
- Daniel Bellissimo (born 1984), Canadian-born Italian ice hockey player
- Francesco Bellissimo (born 1979), Italian business-man and chef
- Teressa Bellissimo, former owner of Anchor Bar and possible creator of Buffalo Wings recipe
- Vince Bellissimo (born 1982), Canadian ice hockey player

== See also ==
- Bellissima (disambiguation)
