= Simon Nielsen =

Simon Nielsen may refer to:

- Simon Nielsen (ice hockey) (born 1986), Danish ice hockey goaltender
- Simon Nielsen (speedway rider) (born 1990), Danish motorcycle speedway rider
