= 2014 IIHF World Championship final =

National Men's Competition Final

	1	2	3	Total
Russia	1	2	2	5
Finland	1	1	0	2
- Date: 25 May 2014
- Arena: Minsk-Arena
- City: Minsk
- Attendance: 15,112

The 2014 IIHF World Championship final was played at the Minsk-Arena in Minsk, Belarus, on 25 May 2014 between Russia and Finland. Russia won the game 5–2 and captured the team's 27th gold medal in history (5th since the Soviet Union dissolution).

== Background ==
Russia played its seventh final, their most recent in 2012, hoping to capture their 27th title (5th since the Soviet Union dissolution in 1991). They progressed through the tournament undefeated, winning all nine games in regulation time before entering the final. Finland on the other side played their ninth final, having won two titles. The teams met during the preliminary round, with Russia winning 4–2. Russia's head coach Oleg Znarok was suspended for one game following an incident in the semifinal against Sweden and was not allowed to coach the team in the final nor join the post-match ceremony. Znarok did, however, communicate with the team throughout the match with a hidden microphone and joined the post-game ceremony.

== Road to the final ==
Russia
Round
Finland
Opponent
Result
Preliminary round
Opponent
Result
Switzerland
5–0
Game 1
Latvia
2–3
Finland
4–2
Game 2
Russia
2–4
United States
6–1
Game 3
Germany
4–0
Kazakhstan
7–2
Game 4
Belarus
2–0
Latvia
4–1
Game 5
Switzerland
3–2 GWS
Germany
3–0
Game 6
United States
1–3
Belarus
2–1
Game 7
Kazakhstan
4–3

Team	Pld	W	OTW	OTL	L	GF	GA	GD	Pts
Russia	7	7	0	0	0	31	7	+24	21
United States	7	4	1	0	2	27	23	+4	14
Belarus	7	4	0	0	3	18	17	+1	12
Finland	7	3	1	0	3	18	15	+3	11
Switzerland	7	3	0	1	3	19	21	−2	10
Latvia	7	3	0	0	4	20	24	−4	9
Germany	7	1	1	0	5	13	23	−10	5
Kazakhstan	7	0	0	2	5	16	32	−16	2

Source: IIHF
Preliminary

Team	Pld	W	OTW	OTL	L	GF	GA	GD	Pts
Russia	7	7	0	0	0	31	7	+24	21
United States	7	4	1	0	2	27	23	+4	14
Belarus	7	4	0	0	3	18	17	+1	12
Finland	7	3	1	0	3	18	15	+3	11
Switzerland	7	3	0	1	3	19	21	−2	10
Latvia	7	3	0	0	4	20	24	−4	9
Germany	7	1	1	0	5	13	23	−10	5
Kazakhstan	7	0	0	2	5	16	32	−16	2

Source: IIHF
Opponent
Result
Playoff
Opponent
Result
France
3–0
Quarterfinals
Canada
3–2
Sweden
3–1
Semifinals
Czech Republic
3–0

== Match ==
=== Summary ===
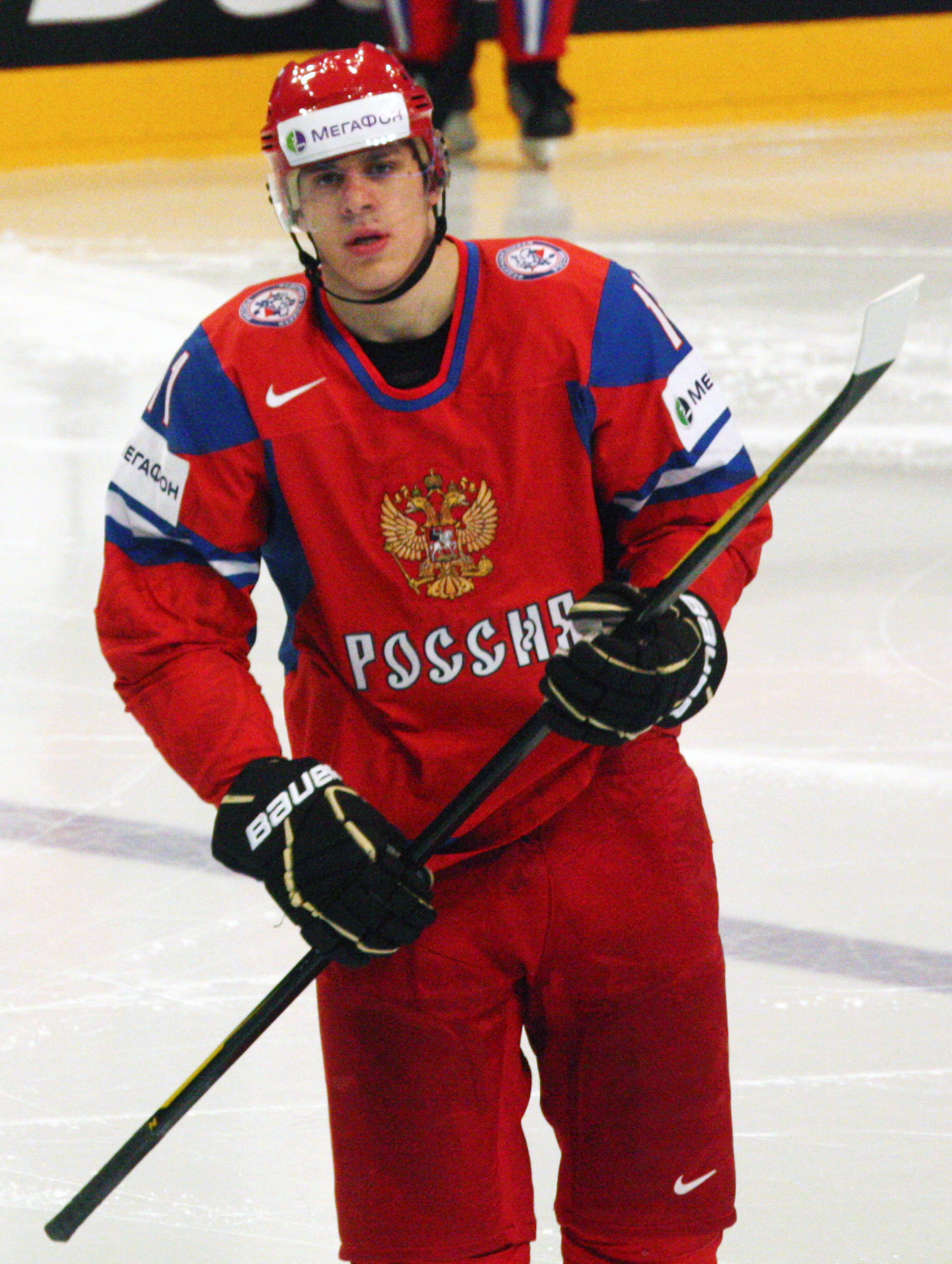
Evgeni Malkin of Russia scored the game-winning goal.

The first period was an evenly and intensely fought contest with much physical play. The period featured five 2-minute penalties, three for Finland and two for Russia, with the Russians receiving two power play opportunities and the Finns one. The Russian team converted on their second power play at the 10:45 mark with a wrist shot by Sergei Shirokov from the left side that bounced in off the right post. Following the goal, the Finnish team had several chances to tie the score, and with three seconds left, Iiro Pakarinen beat Sergei Bobrovsky on a 2-on-2 breakaway to tie the game 1–1.

At 25:20, Zaripov was given a 2-minute interference penalty, and at 26:51, Olli Palola scored on a rebound in the slot to put the Finns up 2–1. The Russians answered back just 43 seconds later with Vadim Shipachyov setting up Alexander Ovechkin for an easy backhander in front of a diving Pekka Rinne. That goal seemed to unleash the Russians' momentum with Finland picking up two consecutive 2-minute penalties, giving the Russian team a two-man advantage for over a minute. That time was enough for Evgeni Malkin to find the back of the net at the 35:36 mark and retake the lead for Russia with a hard slapshot. With less than two minutes to go, Malkin was given a 2-minute hooking penalty. The Finnish team was unable to convert on the ensuing power play. The Russians outshot Finland 18–5 in the second period.

At 42:40, Finland's Tomi Sallinen received a 2-minute penalty for hooking, and at 44:24, Zaripov one-timed his first goal of the game on a great pass by Shirokov through the Finnish defence to give Russia a two-goal lead. Following a 2-minute slashing penalty to Alexander Kutuzov at 45:15, the Finns had a chance to get back in the game, but failed to score. The Finns' comeback attempts were hampered by three penalties in the game's final five minutes, the first of which resulted in tournament scoring leader Viktor Tikhonov sealing the game for the Russians with his first goal of the game and his 16th point by deflecting Kutuzov's shot with his stick.

The game ended 5–2 for Russia, who captured the team's 27th gold medal in history (5th since the Soviet Union dissolution in 1991).

=== Details ===
25 May 2014; 21:00	Russia	5–2 (1–1, 2–1, 2–0)	Finland	Minsk-Arena, Minsk; Attendance: 15,112

Game reference

Sergei Bobrovsky
Goalies
Pekka Rinne
Referees:
(Germany) Lars Brüggemann
(United States) Keith Kaval
Linesmen:
(Canada) Chris Carlson
(Germany) Andre Schrader

S. Shirokov (D. Zaripov) (PP) – 10:45	1–0
	1–1	19:57 – I. Pakarinen (J. Lehterä)
	1–2	26:51 – O. Palola (P. Jormakka, J. Lehterä) (PP)
A. Ovechkin (V. Schipachev) – 27:34	2–2
E. Malkin (D. Zaripov) (PP2) – 35:38	3–2
D. Zaripov (S. Shirokov) (PP) – 44:24	4–2
V. Tikhonov (A. Kutuzov, N. Kulemin) (PP) – 55:53	5–2

12 min
Penalties
28 min
39
Shots
26

== Controversy ==
The match has received heavy criticism, especially within Finland, due to the perceived bias of the referees in favour of Russia, with some reporters calling it the biggest refereeing farce in the sport's history and accusing bribery, as well as Znarok communicating with the team and joining players on the ice after the game despite being forbidden to do so.
