= Oleg Yevenko =

Belarusian ice hockey player

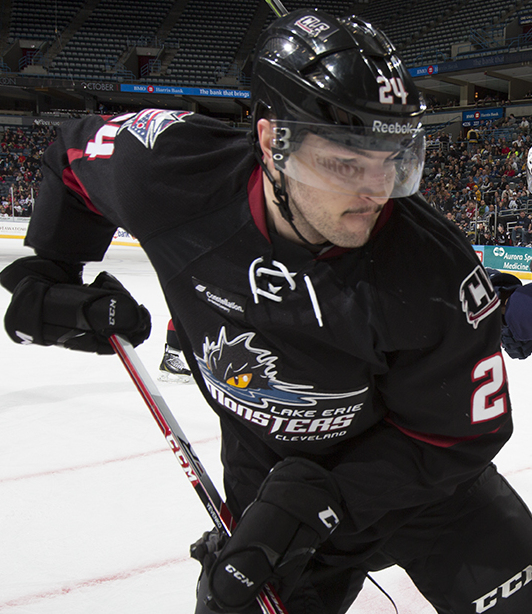
- Yevenko with the Lake Erie Monsters in 2015
- Born: 21 January 1991 (age 35) Minsk, Byelorussian SSR, Soviet Union
- Height: 6 ft 7 in (201 cm)
- Weight: 238 lb (108 kg; 17 st 0 lb)
- Position: Defence
- Shot: Left
- Played for: Adirondack Flames; Cleveland Monsters; Stockton Heat; Dinamo Minsk; Traktor Chelyabinsk; Spartak Moscow
- National team: Belarus
- NHL draft: Undrafted
- Playing career: 2015–2022

Aleh Yevenka (Belarusian: Алег Евенка born 21 January 1991), better known as Oleg Yevenko (Russian: Олег Евенко), is a Belarusian former professional ice hockey defenceman.

== Playing career ==
Oleg played two years with the Fargo Force of the USHL and was a popular player known for his defensive play, hard hits, and fighting skills. Yevenko played collegiate hockey with the UMass Minutemen. After completing his Senior year at UMass, he signed an Amateur tryout with the Adirondack Flames of the AHL to finish the 2014–15 season. Yevenko went scoreless in 4 games with the Flames.

On 29 June 2015, Yevenko signed a one-year AHL contract with the Lake Erie Monsters, an affiliate of the Columbus Blue Jackets. After receiving an invitation to the Blue Jackets training camp for 2015, Yevenko impressed the club to earn a one-year, two-way NHL contract on 1 October 2015.

After his entry-level contract with the Blue Jackets, Yevenko was not tendered an offer as a restricted free agent on June 26, 2017. As a free agent, Yevenko opted to continue in the AHL, returning within the Calgary Flames organization by signing a one-year deal with the Stockton Heat and agreeing to an invite to participate at the Flames training camp. On September 19, 2017, Yevenko was reassigned by the Flames to the Heat. In the 2017–18 season, Yevenko was limited to just 23 games as depth to the Heat's blueline, contributing with 3 assists.

As a free agent Yevenko ended his North American career in signing a one-year deal with hometown club, HC Dinamo Minsk of the KHL on May 2, 2018.

After two seasons in his native Belarus, Yevenko left Dinamo Minsk as a free agent, continuing in the KHL on a one-year contract with Russian club Traktor Chelyabinsk on 8 May 2020.

Yevenko left Traktor Chelyabinsk after his contract, opting to continue in the KHL with HC Spartak Moscow by signing a one-year deal as a free agent on 18 June 2021.

== International play ==
Yevenko was named to the Belarus men's national ice hockey team for competition at the 2014 IIHF World Championship.

== Career statistics ==
=== Regular season and playoffs ===
			Regular season					Playoffs
Season	Team	League	GP	G	A	Pts	PIM	GP	G	A	Pts	PIM
2009–10	Fargo Force	USHL	49	4	5	9	119	13	1	0	1	26
2010–11	Fargo Force	USHL	52	4	4	8	197	3	0	0	0	4
2011–12	UMass-Amherst	HE	33	1	2	3	38	—	—	—	—	—
2012–13	UMass-Amherst	HE	31	0	1	1	55	—	—	—	—	—
2013–14	UMass-Amherst	HE	32	0	1	1	67	—	—	—	—	—
2014–15	UMass-Amherst	HE	36	0	5	5	51	—	—	—	—	—
2014–15	Adirondack Flames	AHL	4	0	0	0	14	—	—	—	—	—
2015–16	Lake Erie Monsters	AHL	54	1	3	4	152	—	—	—	—	—
2016–17	Cleveland Monsters	AHL	49	0	5	5	90	—	—	—	—	—
2017–18	Stockton Heat	AHL	23	0	4	4	79	—	—	—	—	—
2018–19	Dinamo Minsk	KHL	44	2	1	3	67	—	—	—	—	—
2019–20	Dinamo Minsk	KHL	48	2	4	6	91	—	—	—	—	—
2020–21	Traktor Chelyabinsk	KHL	41	0	2	2	71	2	0	0	0	0
2021–22	Spartak Moscow	KHL	29	1	2	3	20	5	0	0	0	8
AHL totals			130	1	12	13	335	—	—	—	—	—
KHL totals			162	5	9	14	249	7	0	0	0	8

=== International ===
Year	Team	Event	Result	GP	G	A	Pts	PIM
2009	Belarus	WJC18-D1	11th	5	0	2	2	6
2014	Belarus	WC	7th	8	0	2	2	6
2015	Belarus	WC	7th	8	0	0	0	2
2016	Belarus	WC	12th	7	0	0	0	12
2016	Belarus	OGQ	NQ	3	0	0	0	2
2017	Belarus	WC	13th	7	0	0	0	4
2019	Belarus	WC-D1	18th	5	1	0	1	0
Junior totals				5	0	2	2	6
Senior totals				38	1	2	3	26
