= Andreas Stene =

Norwegian ice hockey player

- Born: March 1, 1991 (age 34); Oslo, Norway
- Height: 6 ft 3 in (191 cm)
- Weight: 201 lb (91 kg; 14 st 5 lb)
- Position: Centre
- Shoots: Left
- GET-ligaen team Former teams: Vålerenga; Sparta Warriors; Mora IK; Timrå IK
- National team: Norway
- NHL draft: Undrafted
- Playing career: 2008–present

Andreas Stene (born March 1, 1991) is a Norwegian ice hockey player. He is currently playing with the Vålerenga of the Norwegian GET-ligaen.

== International ==
Stene was named to the Norway men's national ice hockey team for competition at the 2014 and 2015 IIHF World Championships.
