= Niclas Andersén =

Swedish ice hockey player (born 1988)

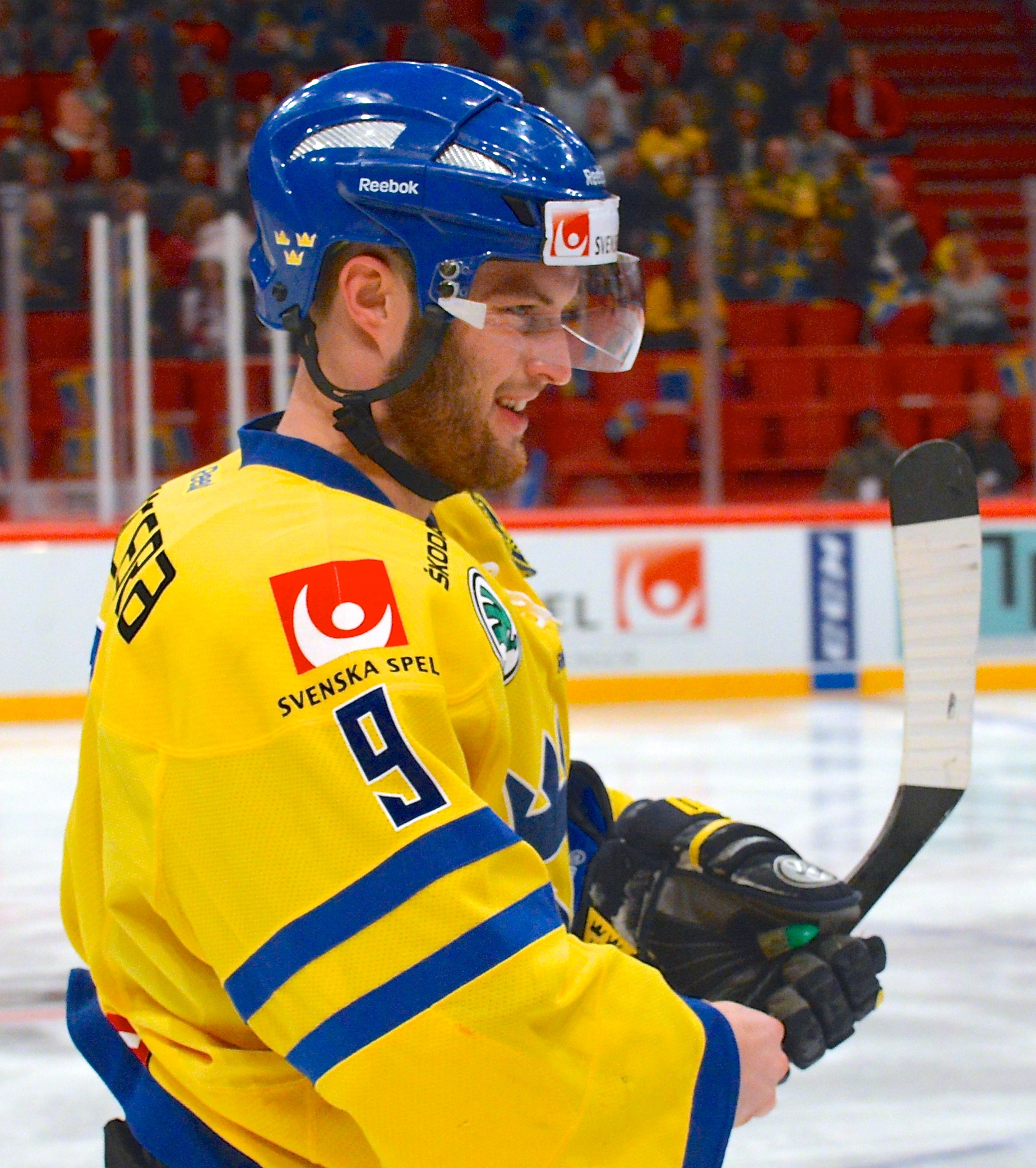
- Niclas Andersén in May 2014
- Born: 28 April 1988 (age 38) Grums, Sweden
- Height: 6 ft 0 in (183 cm)
- Weight: 209 lb (95 kg; 14 st 13 lb)
- Position: Defence
- Shot: Left
- Played for: Leksands IF; Severstal Cherepovets; WBS Penguins; Avtomobilist Yekaterinburg; EHC Kloten; Jokerit; Brynäs IF
- National team: Sweden
- NHL draft: 114th overall, 2006; Los Angeles Kings
- Playing career: 2007–2022

Niclas Andersén (born 28 April 1988) is a Swedish former professional ice hockey defenceman who last played for Brynäs IF of the Swedish Hockey League (SHL). He was originally drafted by the Los Angeles Kings in the fourth round of the 2006 NHL entry draft, 114th overall.

== Playing career ==
Born in Grums, he started with local club Grums IK, moving to Leksands IF, where he made his debut in the Swedish Hockey League (SHL) during the 2005–06 season. In 2007, he joined fellow SHL side Brynäs IF and spent five years with the club. He captured the Swedish championship with Brynäs in 2012.

Andersén signed with Severstal Cherepovets of the Kontinental Hockey League (KHL) ahead of the 2012–13 season. Following his two-year KHL stint, he returned to Brynäs IF, where he captained during the 2014–15 season.

Andersén opted to finally pursue a North American career in 2015, agreeing to a one-year entry-level contract as a free agent with the Pittsburgh Penguins of the National Hockey League (NHL) on 15 June 2015. He did not see any NHL action, but appeared in 75 games with PIttsburgh's AHL affiliate Wilkes-Barre/Scranton Penguins.

On 2 June 2016, he signed a deal to leave North America after one season in signing with Russian KHL outfit, Avtomobilist Yekaterinburg.

On 12 June 2017, Andersén agreed to a one-year contract with EHC Kloten of the National League (NL). On 9 November 2017, Andersen was released by Kloten after posting a -15 plus/minus rating and scoring only 1 point in 18 games. He then joined Finnish club Jokerit of the KHL for the remainder of the season.

On 23 April 2018, Andersén, as a free agent, returned to his native Sweden, signing a three-year SHL contract with his former club, Brynäs IF.

== International play ==
Andersén was a member of Sweden's bronze-winning squad at the 2014 World Championships.

== Career statistics ==
=== Regular season and playoffs ===
			Regular season					Playoffs
Season	Team	League	GP	G	A	Pts	PIM	GP	G	A	Pts	PIM
2003–04	Grums IK	SWE.3	20	4	5	9	45	—	—	—	—	—
2004–05	Leksands IF	J20	26	2	3	5	9	5	0	2	2	2
2005–06	Leksands IF	J18 Allsv	3	0	3	3	8	2	0	0	0	10
2005–06	Leksands IF	J20	35	5	6	11	214	—	—	—	—	—
2005–06	Leksands IF	SEL	8	0	0	0	8	—	—	—	—	—
2006–07	Leksands IF	J20	4	1	1	2	47	—	—	—	—	—
2006–07	Leksands IF	Allsv	29	0	3	3	26	6	0	2	2	12
2007–08	Brynäs IF	J20	5	0	1	1	35	—	—	—	—	—
2007–08	Brynäs IF	SEL	38	0	3	3	26	—	—	—	—	—
2007–08	AIK	Allsv	3	1	1	2	2	—	—	—	—	—
2008–09	Brynäs IF	SEL	55	0	8	8	60	4	0	0	0	4
2009–10	Brynäs IF	SEL	42	3	3	6	28	—	—	—	—	—
2010–11	Brynäs IF	SEL	51	4	4	8	42	5	0	0	0	0
2011–12	Brynäs IF	SEL	55	1	7	8	48	17	1	2	3	8
2012–13	Severstal Cherepovets	KHL	51	1	5	6	20	10	0	0	0	0
2013–14	Severstal Cherepovets	KHL	50	3	5	8	32	—	—	—	—	—
2014–15	Brynäs IF	SHL	54	5	17	22	32	4	0	0	0	4
2015–16	Wilkes–Barre/Scranton Penguins	AHL	69	4	10	14	26	6	1	0	1	4
2016–17	Avtomobilist Yekaterinburg	KHL	37	3	10	13	8	—	—	—	—	—
2017–18	EHC Kloten	NL	18	1	0	1	4	—	—	—	—	—
2017–18	Jokerit	KHL	10	0	1	1	6	10	0	1	1	8
2018–19	Brynäs IF	SHL	45	3	3	6	28	—	—	—	—	—
2019–20	Brynäs IF	SHL	38	1	5	6	22	—	—	—	—	—
2020–21	Brynäs IF	SHL	42	1	5	6	20	—	—	—	—	—
SHL totals			428	18	55	73	314	30	1	2	3	16
KHL totals			148	7	21	28	66	20	0	1	1	8

Medal record

Representing Sweden

Ice hockey

World Championships
Bronze medal – third place	2014 Minsk	

=== International ===
Year	Team	Event	Result	GP	G	A	Pts	PIM
2005	Sweden	WJC18	3rd place, bronze medalist(s)	7	0	0	0	12
2005	Sweden	U18	7th	5	0	0	0	6
2006	Sweden	WJC18	6th	6	1	1	2	14
2008	Sweden	WJC	2nd place, silver medalist(s)	6	0	2	2	6
2014	Sweden	WC	3rd place, bronze medalist(s)	8	0	2	2	8
Junior totals				24	1	3	4	38
Senior totals				8	0	2	2	8

== Awards and honors ==
Award	Year
SHL
Le Mat trophy (Brynäs IF)	2012
