= Damien Raux =

French ice hockey player

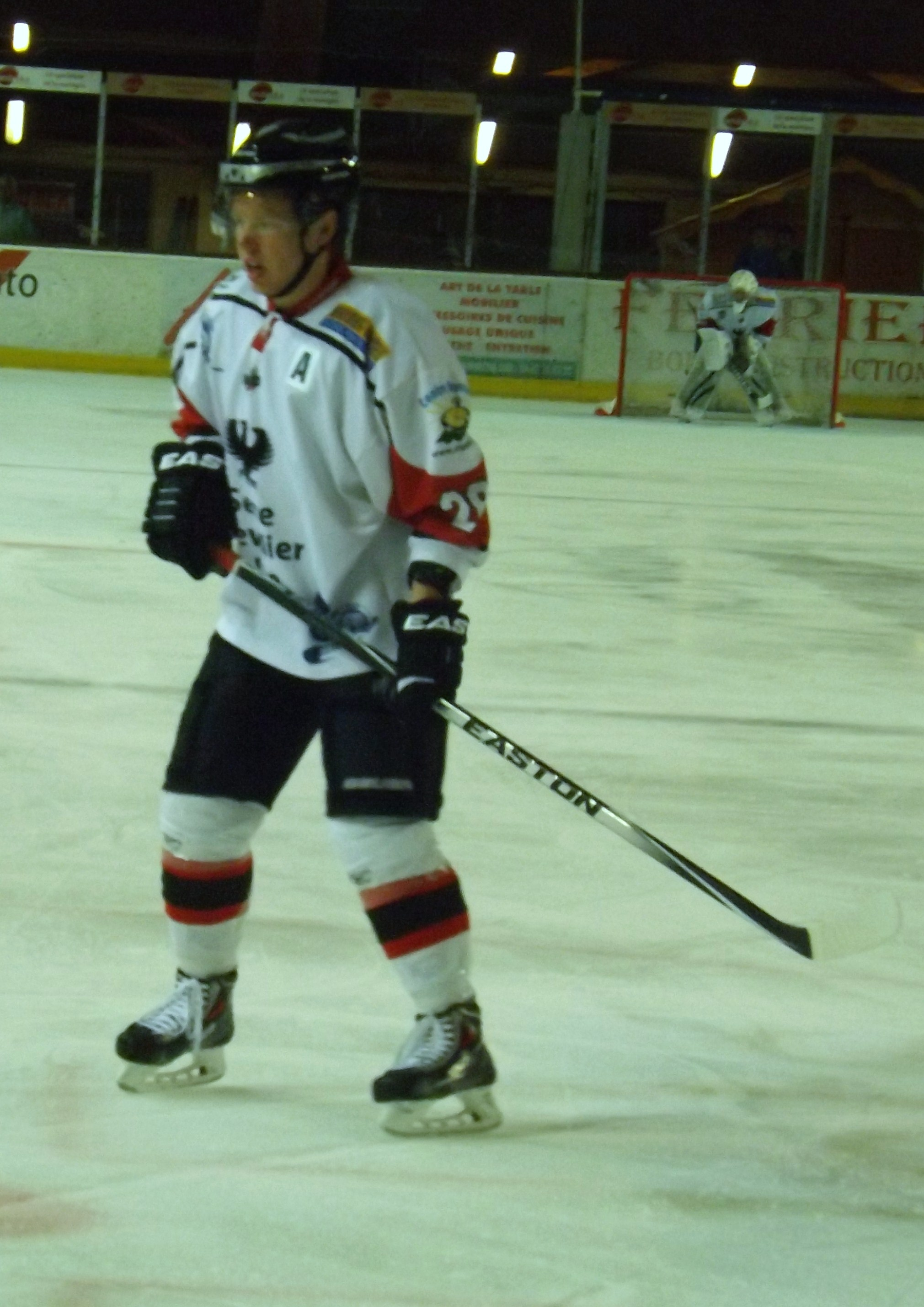
- Born: November 3, 1984 (age 41) Rouen, France
- Height: 5 ft 10 in (178 cm)
- Weight: 181 lb (82 kg; 12 st 13 lb)
- Position: Forward
- Shoots: Left
- Magnus team Former teams: Scorpions de Mulhouse; Dragons de Rouen; Drakkars de Caen; Diables Rouges de Briançon; Brûleurs de Loups; Ducs d'Angers; Rapaces de Gap
- National team: France
- Playing career: 2001–present

Damien Raux (born November 3, 1984) is a French professional ice hockey forward who currently plays for Scorpions de Mulhouse in the Ligue Magnus.

== International ==
Raux participated at the IIHF World Championship as a member of the France National team in 2010 and 2014.
