= Alexei Yefimenko =

Belarusian ice hockey player

- Born: August 20, 1985 (age 39); Slavgorod, Russia
- Height: 6 ft 1 in (185 cm)
- Weight: 187 lb (85 kg; 13 st 5 lb)
- Position: Forward
- Shoots: Right
- KHL team Former teams: HC Sibir Novosibirsk; HC Shakhter Soligorsk
- National team: Belarus
- NHL draft: Undrafted
- Playing career: 2004–present

Alexei Yefimenko (born August 20, 1985) is a Belarusian ice hockey player.

== International ==
Yefimenko competed in the 2013 IIHF World Championship as a member of the Belarus men's national ice hockey team.

He was named to the Belarus men's national ice hockey team for competition at the 2014 IIHF World Championship.
