= Torsten Ankert =

German ice hockey player

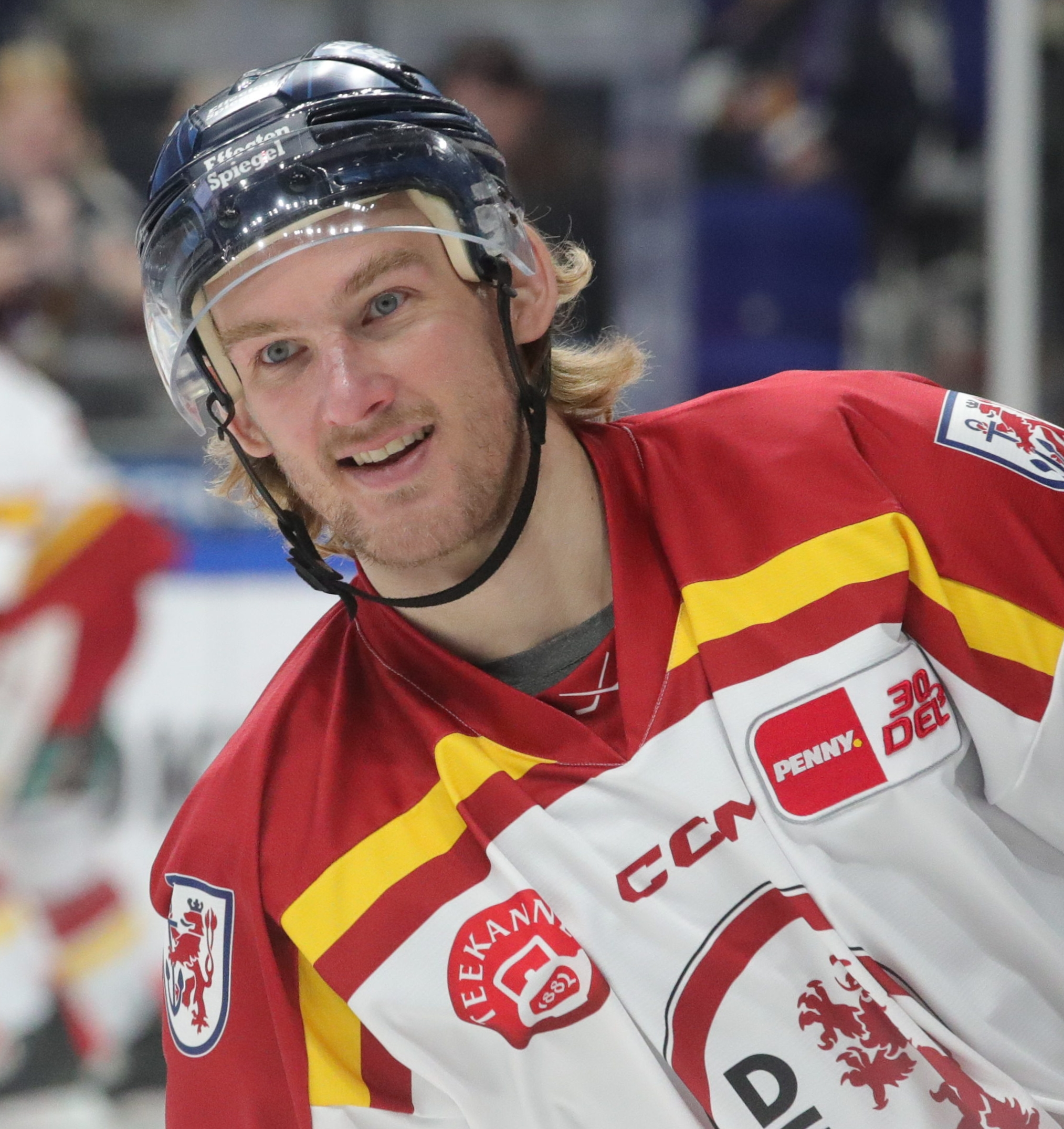
- Torsten Ankert, 2023
- Born: June 22, 1988 (age 37); Essen, West Germany
- Height: 6 ft 2 in (188 cm)
- Weight: 220 lb (100 kg; 15 st 10 lb)
- Position: Defence
- Shoots: Right
- DEL team Former teams: Düsseldorfer EG; Kölner Haie; Grizzlys Wolfsburg; Krefeld Pinguine; Iserlohn Roosters
- National team: Germany
- Playing career: 2005–present

Torsten Ankert (born June 22, 1988) is a German professional ice hockey defenceman. He is currently playing for Düsseldorfer EG in the Deutsche Eishockey Liga (DEL).

== Playing career ==
After coming up through the junior ranks within Kölner Haie, he made his professional debut in the DEL, with Haie, in the 2005–06 season. He played his first 12 professional seasons in Cologne, before leaving as a free agent to sign a two-year contract with fellow German outfit, Grizzlys Wolfsburg of the DEL on April 27, 2017.

In the final year of his contract with Wolfsburg, Ankert made just 7 appearances with the club in the 2018–19 season, before terminating his contract to join fellow DEL club, Krefeld Pinguine, on October 10, 2018. Establishing a role within the blueline of Krefeld, Ankert was signed to a two-year contract extension on February 5, 2019.

In his only full season with Krefeld in 2019–20, Ankert served as team captain, matching a career high with 12 points through 52 regular season games before the playoffs were cancelled due to the COVID-19 pandemic.

As a free agent from Krefeld after mutually terminating the final year of his contract, Ankert was signed by the Iserlohn Roosters on a two-year contract on 29 November 2020.

Captaining the Roosters for three seasons, Ankert left the club following the 2022–23 campaign, signing a one-year contract with Düsseldorfer EG on 19 May 2023.

== Career statistics ==
=== International ===
Year	Team	Event	GP	G	A	Pts	PIM
2005	Germany	U17	5	0	1	1	2
2005	Germany	WJC18	6	0	1	1	6
2006	Germany	WJC18	6	0	0	0	8
2008	Germany	WJC-D1	5	1	5	6	2
2013	Germany	WC	7	1	0	1	4
2014	Germany	WC	6	0	2	2	2
2016	Germany	WC	3	0	0	0	2
Junior totals			22	1	7	8	18
Senior totals			16	1	2	3	8
