= Julien Desrosiers =

French ice hockey player

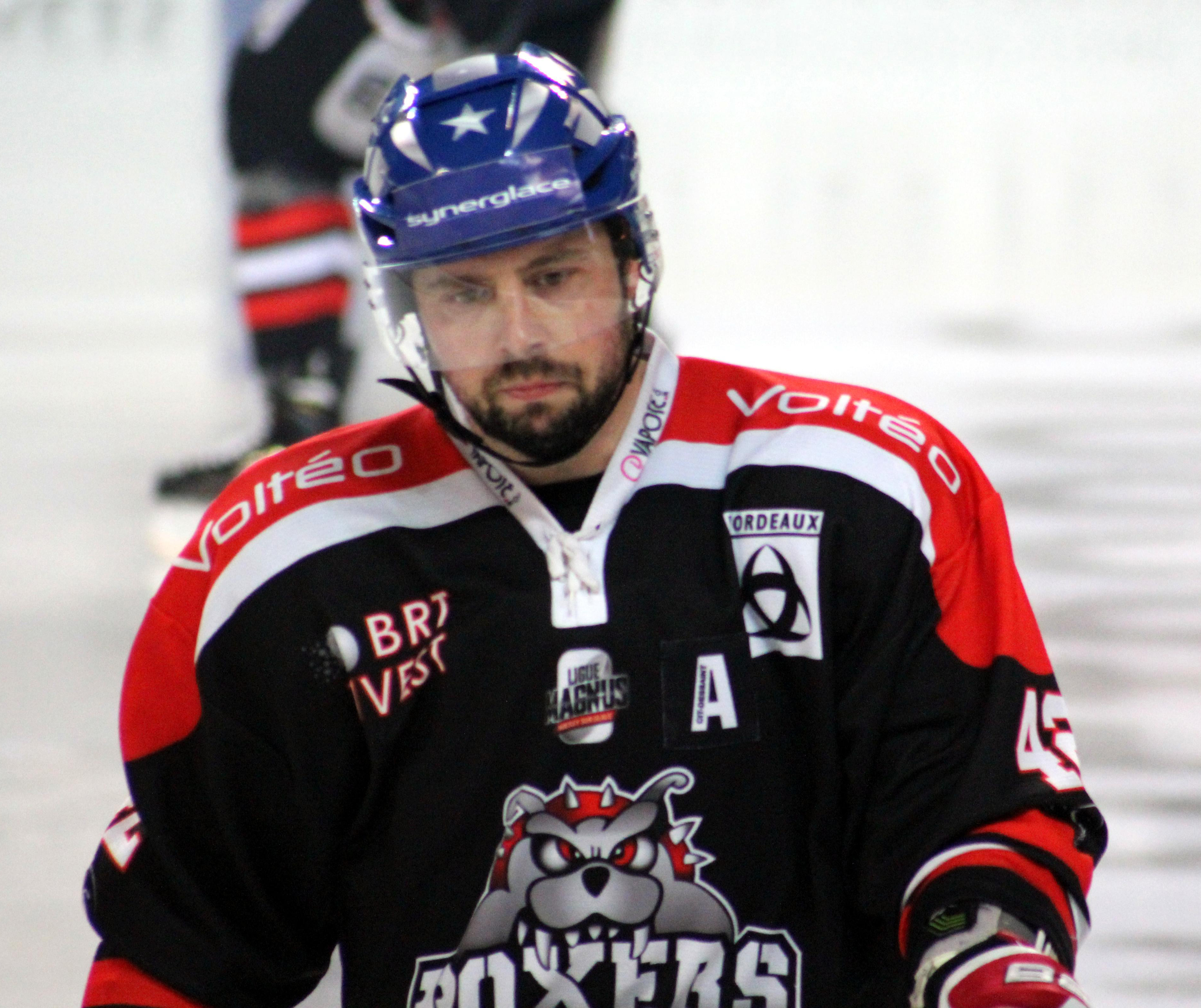
- Desrosiers in 2016 with Boxers de Bordeaux
- Born: October 14, 1980 (age 45) Saint-Anaclet-de-Lessard, CAN
- Height: 5 ft 10 in (178 cm)
- Weight: 183 lb (83 kg; 13 st 1 lb)
- Position: Forward
- Shot: Left
- Played for: Diables Noirs de Tours; Diables Rouges de Briançon; Dragons de Rouen; Boxers de Bordeaux
- National team: France
- NHL draft: Undrafted
- Playing career: 2002–2019

Julien Desrosiers (born October 14, 1980) is a Canadian-French former ice hockey player. He played in French Ligue Magnus for the Diables Noirs de Tours, the Diables Rouges de Briançon, the Dragons de Rouen and the Boxers de Bordeaux. He represented France in ten Ice Hockey World Championships. He is currently head coach for the Drummondville Voltigeurs of the Quebec Major Junior Hockey League (QMJHL).

== Playing career ==
He started his career in 1997 playing for Rimouski Océanic in the QMJHL. He notably played with Vincent Lecavalier and Brad Richards, who played in the National Hockey League later. In 2001, he left North America to play in France for the Étoile Noire de Strasbourg in Division 1, the second level of national ice hockey, during one season.
