= Vince Bellissimo =

Canadian ice hockey player (born 1982)

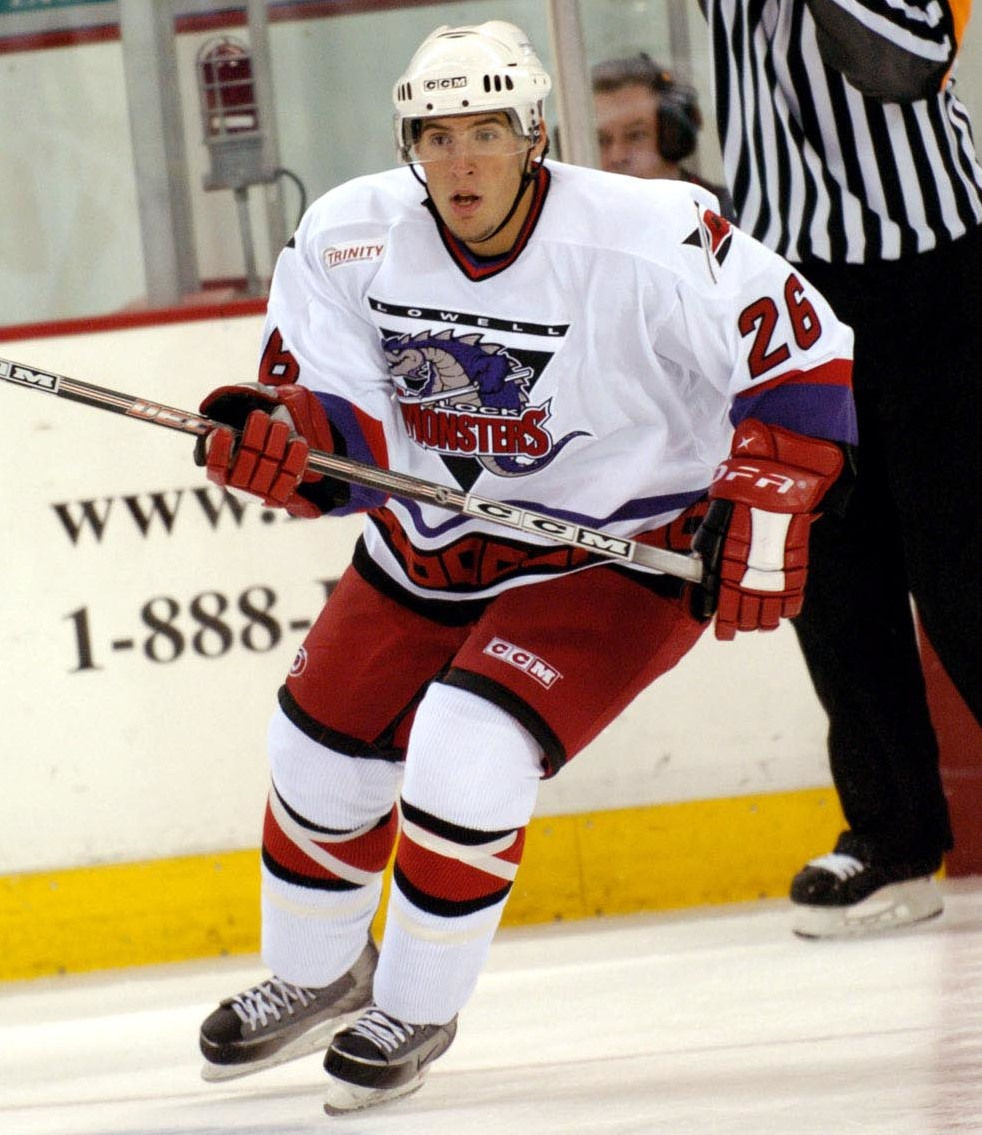
- Bellissimo with the Lowell Lock Monsters in 2005
- Born: December 14, 1982 (age 43) Toronto, Ontario, Canada
- Height: 6 ft 0 in (183 cm)
- Weight: 181 lb (82 kg; 12 st 13 lb)
- Position: Right wing
- Shot: Right
- Played for: San Antonio Rampage; Lowell Lock Monsters; KalPa; ERC Ingolstadt; HC TWK Innsbruck; HC Asiago
- NHL draft: 158th overall, 2002; Florida Panthers
- Playing career: 2005–2011

Vince Bellissimo (born December 14, 1982) is a Canadian former professional ice hockey player. Bellissimo was selected by the Florida Panthers in the 5th round (158th overall) of the 2002 NHL entry draft.

== Playing career ==
Bellissimo, brother of Daniel Bellissimo, played NCAA college hockey with the Western Michigan Broncos men's ice hockey team before beginning his professional career in the American Hockey League with the San Antonio Rampage near the end of the 2004–05 AHL season.

In 2007, after three seasons of playing in the North American minor leagues, Bellissimo arrived in Europe to play in the Deutsche Eishockey Liga (DEL) with the ERC Ingolstadt. In 2009, after two brief experiences in SM-liiga, Finland, and Austria, he returned to Ingolstadt.

During the 2009-10 season, Bellissimo arrived at HC Asiago where his brother Daniel was playing already. After winning the title with Asiago, for family reasons he decided to return to North America to play his final 2010–11 season in the ECHL with the Las Vegas Wranglers.

== Career statistics ==
			Regular season					Playoffs
Season	Team	League	GP	G	A	Pts	PIM	GP	G	A	Pts	PIM
1998–99	Caledon Canadians	OPJHL	46	16	26	42	25	—	—	—	—	—
1999–2000	St. Michael's Buzzers	OPJHL	47	30	29	59	31	—	—	—	—	—
2000–01	St. Michael's Buzzers	OPJHL	47	32	64	96	28	6	8	6	14	2
2001–02	Topeka ScareCrows	USHL	61	37	39	76	33	—	—	—	—	—
2002–03	Western Michigan University	CCHA	37	19	17	36	18	—	—	—	—	—
2003–04	Western Michigan University	CCHA	38	13	27	40	42	—	—	—	—	—
2004–05	Western Michigan University	CCHA	35	17	20	37	76	—	—	—	—	—
2004–05	San Antonio Rampage	AHL	12	3	3	6	2	—	—	—	—	—
2005–06	Lowell Lock Monsters	AHL	47	8	6	14	20	—	—	—	—	—
2005–06	Florida Everblades	ECHL	19	13	10	23	2	8	5	8	13	4
2006–07	Florida Everblades	ECHL	56	29	43	72	31	16	12	11	23	10
2007–08	ERC Ingolstadt	DEL	55	31	25	56	89	3	0	2	2	2
2008–09	KalPa	SM-liiga	15	2	4	6	12	—	—	—	—	—
2008–09	HC TWK Innsbruck	AUT	35	18	23	41	50	6	2	2	4	12
2009–10	ERC Ingolstadt	DEL	29	8	6	14	51	—	—	—	—	—
2009–10	HC Asiago	ITA	8	4	7	11	6	15	3	18	21	22
2010–11	Las Vegas Wranglers	ECHL	13	9	7	16	14	—	—	—	—	—
AHL totals			59	11	9	20	22	—	—	—	—	—
ECHL totals			88	51	60	111	47	24	17	19	36	14
DEL totals			84	31	39	70	140	3	0	2	2	2

== Awards and honours ==
Award	Year
All-CCHA Rookie Team	2002-03
