= Karol Sloboda =

Slovak ice hockey player

- Born: 16 May 1983 (age 43) Bratislava, Czechoslovakia
- Height: 6 ft 1 in (185 cm)
- Weight: 198 lb (90 kg; 14 st 2 lb)
- Position: Defence
- Shoots: Right
- team Former teams: Free agent HK Dukla Trenčín; HC Sparta Praha; HC Slovan Bratislava; HK 36 Skalica; HC Slavia Praha; HC Karlovy Vary; HC Lada Togliatti; HC '05 Banská Bystrica; HC Vítkovice Steel; Bratislava Capitals
- National team: Slovakia
- NHL draft: Undrafted
- Playing career: 2000–present

Karol Sloboda (born 16 May 1983) is a Slovak professional ice hockey player. He is currently a free agent having last played for Bratislava Capitals of the bet-at-home ICE Hockey League.

== Career ==
He had most recently played for HC Vítkovice Steel in the Czech Extraliga. He has formerly played with HC Slovan Bratislava in the Slovak Extraliga.

== Career statistics ==
=== Regular season and playoffs ===
			Regular season					Playoffs
Season	Team	League	GP	G	A	Pts	PIM	GP	G	A	Pts	PIM

=== International ===
Year	Team	Event	Result	GP	G	A	Pts	PIM
