= Bellissima =

Bellissima ("Very Beautiful" in Italian) may refer to:

- Bellissima (film), a 1951 film by Luchino Visconti
- Bellissima!, a 1988 Pizzicato Five album
- "I Have a Dream"/"Bellissima", a 1997 DJ Quicksilver song
- "Bellissima" (Annalisa song), 2022
- MSC Bellissima, a cruise ship
- Trialeurodes bellissima, a whitefly species

== See also ==
- Belíssima telenovela
