= Alexander Kutuzov =

Russian ice hockey player

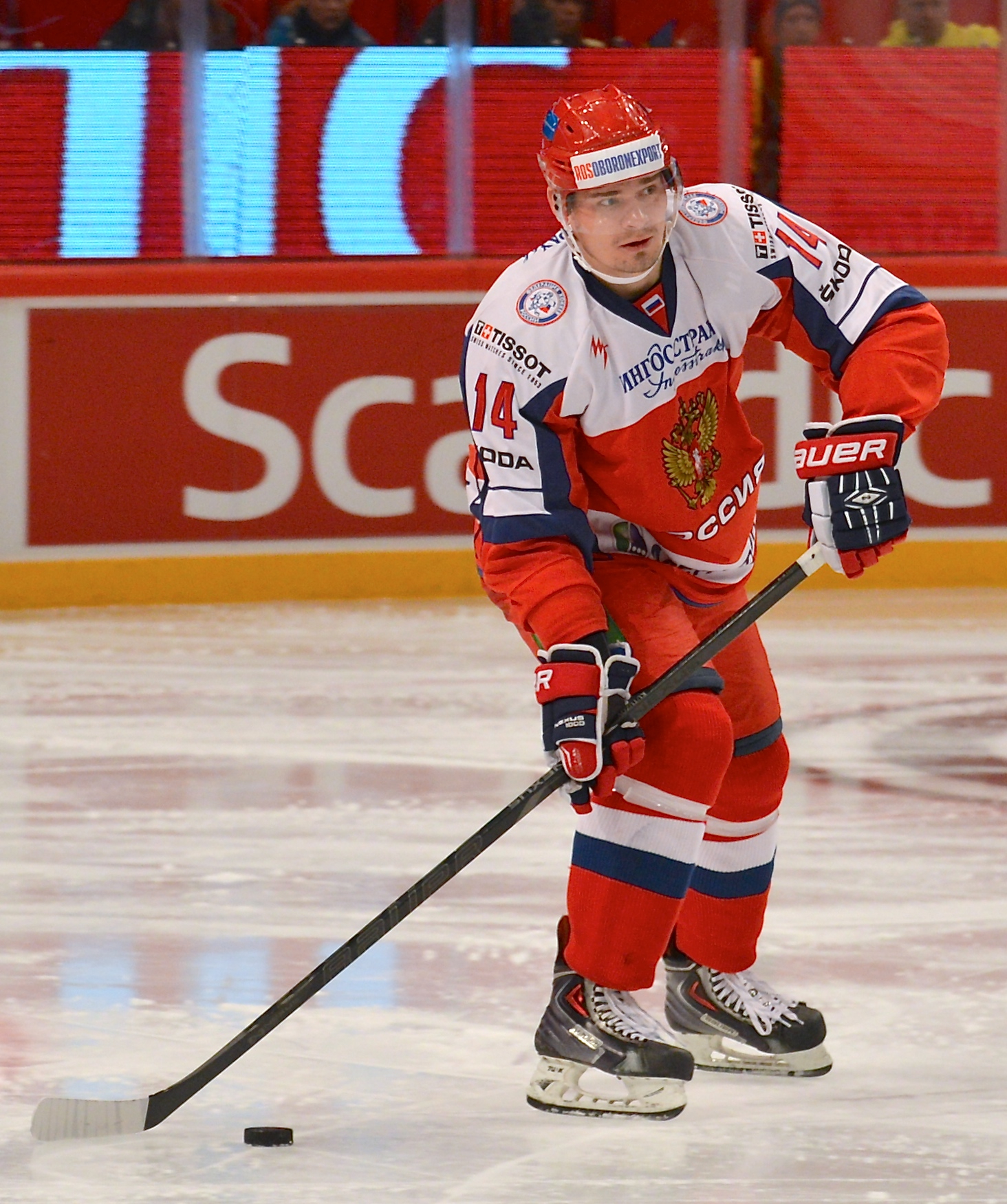
- Born: November 23, 1985 (age 40) Tver, Russian SFSR, USSR
- Height: 6 ft 0 in (183 cm)
- Weight: 205 lb (93 kg; 14 st 9 lb)
- Position: Defence
- Shoots: Right
- Played for: Sibir Novosibirsk; HC MVD; Neftekhimik Nizhnekamsk; Dynamo Moscow; Salavat Yulaev Ufa; CSKA Moscow; Lokomotiv Yaroslavl; Spartak Moscow
- National team: Russia
- Playing career: 2002–present

Alexander Kutuzov (born November 23, 1985) is a former Russian professional ice hockey defenceman.

== Playing career ==
Kutuzov began his career with THK Tver in 2002 who later became HC MVD in 2004. In 2008 he moved to HC Neftekhimik Nizhnekamsk but after four games he moved to Sibir Novosibirsk. He remained until January 13, 2012, when he moved to HC Dynamo Moscow and eventually won the Gagarin Cup. In June 2012 Kutuzov moved back to Sibir Novosibirsk. On May 16, 2014, it became known that Kutuzov was signed by Salavat Yulaev Ufa for the 2014–15 and 2015–16 KHL seasons.

On April 28, 2018, Kutuzov agreed to a one-year contract extension to return for a second season with Lokomotiv Yaroslavl in 2018–19.

== International play ==
Medal record

Representing Russia

Ice hockey

World Championships
Gold medal – first place	2014 Minsk	

While playing for the Russia men's national ice hockey team at the 2014 IIHF World Championship, Kutuzov scored his first goal for the team in his career during the quarterfinals against France, spurring a wave of jokes among Russian fans and media due to parallels with Field Marshal Kutuzov, commander-in-chief of the Russian Army, that defeated French Grande Armée of Napoleon in the war of 1812.

For winning the 2014 IIHF World Championship, Alexander Kutuzov was awarded the Order of Honour on May 27, 2014.
