= Daniel Bellissimo =

Canadian-born Italian ice hockey player

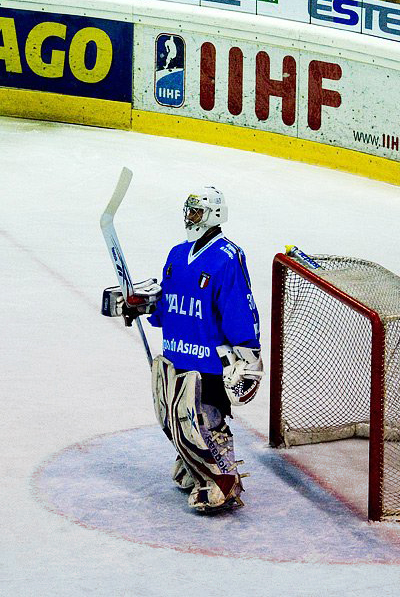
- Born: August 15, 1984 (age 40); Toronto, Ontario, Canada
- Height: 6 ft 2 in (188 cm)
- Weight: 179 lb (81 kg; 12 st 11 lb)
- Position: Goaltender
- Catches: Left
- Elitserien team: Luleå HF
- National team: Italy
- NHL draft: Undrafted
- Playing career: 2007–present

Daniel Bellissimo
Medal record

Representing Italy

Ice hockey

Ice Hockey World Championships
Gold medal – first place	2011 Hungary	Division I Group A

Daniel Bellissimo (born August 15, 1984) is a Canadian-born Italian retired professional ice hockey goaltender. He last played with Luleå HF of the Swedish Elitserien. Is active GM of Streetsville in the SOHL.

Born in Toronto, Bellissimo played junior hockey in the OPJHL for the Vaughan Vipers. He moved to the Italian team HC Asiago in 2006, where he played with his brother Vince. He won two Top League title in Italy.

Thanks to his Italian origins, he participated at the 2010 IIHF World Championship as a member of the Italy men's national ice hockey team.
