= Simon Nielsen (ice hockey) =

Danish ice hockey player

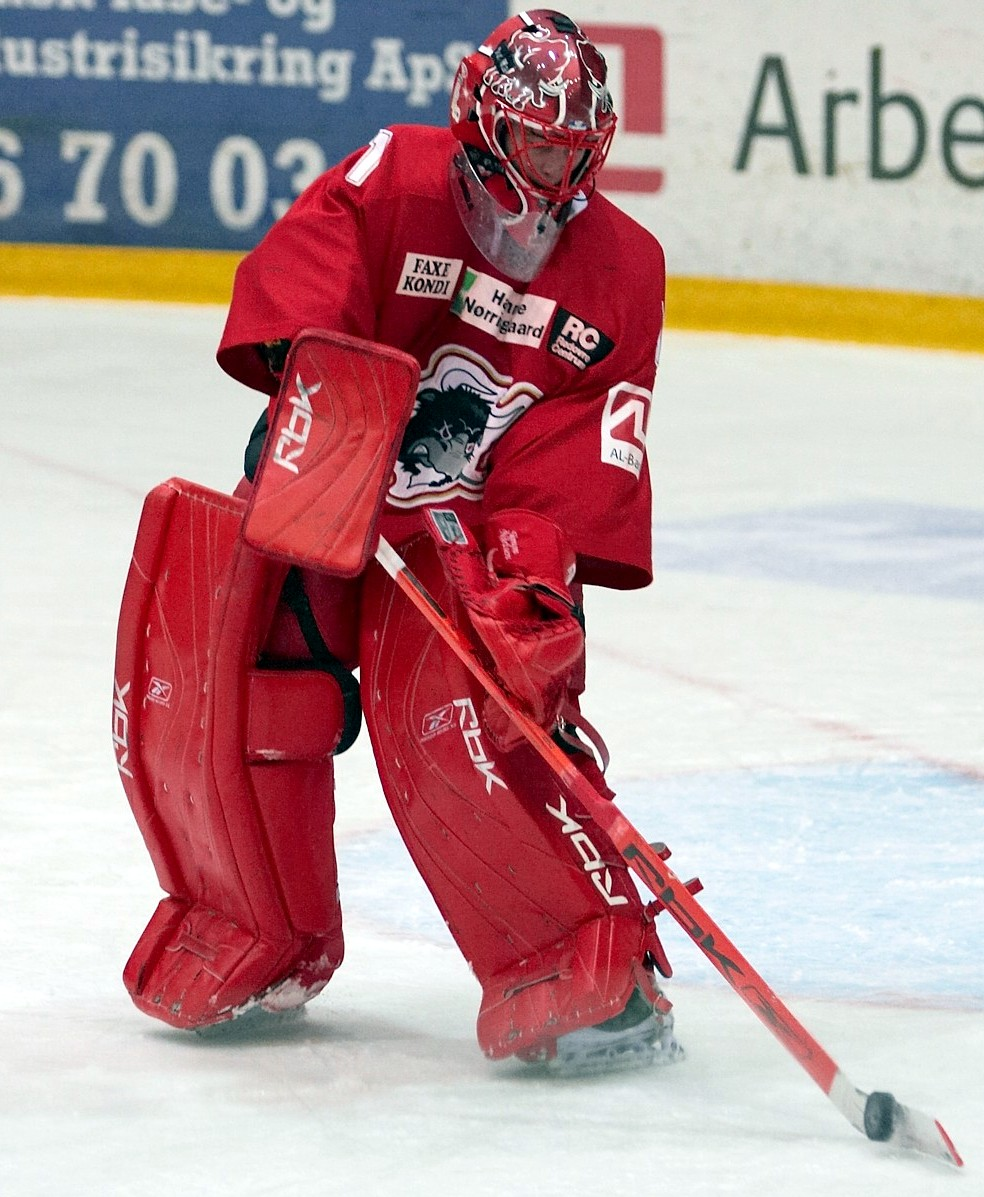
- Born: 27 October 1986 (age 38); Herning, Denmark
- Height: 6 ft 2 in (188 cm)
- Weight: 190 lb (86 kg; 13 st 8 lb)
- Position: Goaltender
- Catches: Left
- Metal team Former teams: Herning Blue Fox; Aalborg Pirates; Rødovre Mighty Bulls; Amarillo Gorillas; Kassel Huskies; Hokki; LeKi; Lukko; SaPKo; TuTo; Lørenskog IK
- National team: Denmark
- Playing career: 2005–present

Simon Nielsen (born 27 October 1986) is a Danish ice hockey professional goaltender who currently plays for Herning Blue Fox in the Metal Ligaen.

== Personal life ==
Simon is the younger brother of Frans Nielsen, who plays forward for the Detroit Red Wings.
