= Craig Anderson (ice hockey) =

American ice hockey player (born 1981)

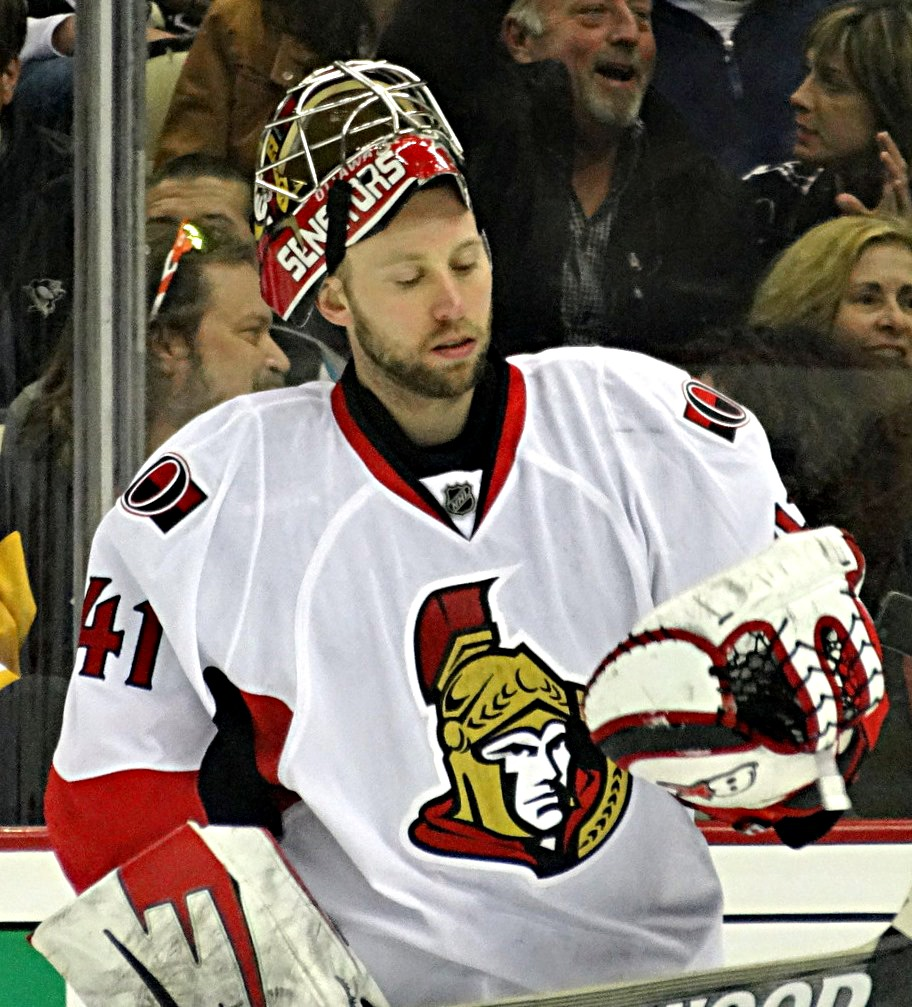
- Anderson with the Ottawa Senators in May 2013
- Born: May 21, 1981 (age 45) Park Ridge, Illinois, U.S.
- Height: 6 ft 2 in (188 cm)
- Weight: 180 lb (82 kg; 12 st 12 lb)
- Position: Goaltender
- Caught: Left
- Played for: Chicago Blackhawks; Florida Panthers; Colorado Avalanche; Ottawa Senators; Washington Capitals; Buffalo Sabres
- National team: United States
- NHL draft: 77th overall, 1999; Calgary Flames; 73rd overall, 2001; Chicago Blackhawks
- Playing career: 2001–2023
- Website: anderson41.com

Craig Peter Anderson (born May 21, 1981) is an American former professional ice hockey goaltender. He played for the Chicago Blackhawks, Florida Panthers, Colorado Avalanche, Ottawa Senators, Washington Capitals, and Buffalo Sabres, with the Senators being his longest-tenured team. Internationally, Anderson represented the United States on multiple occasions. He is one of 40 NHL goaltenders to have won over 300 games in their career.

== Playing career ==
=== Early career ===
As a youth, Anderson played in the 1994 and 1995 Quebec International Pee-Wee Hockey Tournaments with the Chicago Freeze, a junior ice hockey team from Chicago.

==== Guelph Storm ====
Anderson finished the 1998–99 season with the Guelph Storm of the Ontario Hockey League (OHL), where he served as a backup to Chris Madden. In 21 games with the Storm, Anderson went 12–5–1 with a 3.10 GAA, helping the Storm reach the playoffs. In three playoff games for Guelph, Anderson went 0–2 with a 4.74 GAA. After the season, Anderson was drafted by the Calgary Flames in the third round, 77th overall, in the 1999 NHL entry draft.

He returned to the Storm for the 1999–2000 season, where he split the goaltending duties with Madden once again. In 38 games, Anderson had a 12–17–5 record with a 3.59 GAA. The Storm reached the playoffs, and in three games, Anderson went 0–1 with a 2.73 GAA and a .931 save percentage.

In 2000–01, Anderson became the starter for the Storm, as he appeared in 59 games, earning a record of 30–19–9 with a 2.63 GAA along with a .918 save percentage to win the OHL Goaltender of the Year award. In the playoffs, Anderson and the Storm struggled, as he went 0–4 with 4.25 GAA as Guelph was swept in the first round. Anderson then re-entered the NHL entry draft for 2001, as he failed to sign a contract with the Calgary Flames, who drafted him in 1999. The Chicago Blackhawks drafted Anderson in the third round, 73rd overall.

During his tenure with Guelph, Anderson was known as Craig Andersson. In an interview with Sportsnet in 2011, Anderson admitted he added an extra s to his surname following a tournament in Sweden, in which he said was to serve as a memento to his time in the country.

Upon being drafted by the Calgary Flames in 1999, he was recognized in the team's official records as Craig Andersson, despite the fact it wasn't actually his legal surname. Anderson was forced to abandon the practice of using the extra letter upon signing his first professional contract with the Chicago Blackhawks.

=== Professional career ===
==== Chicago Blackhawks (2001–2006) ====
The Chicago Blackhawks assigned Anderson to the Norfolk Admirals of the American Hockey League (AHL) for the 2001–02, where he served as a backup to Michael Leighton. In 28 games with the Admirals, Anderson went 9–13–4 with a 2.86 GAA. He then played in a playoff game for the team, going 0–1 with a 2.86 GAA and .938 save percentage in 21 minutes of work.

Anderson spent the majority of the 2002–03 season with the Admirals, going 15–11–4 with a 1.94 GAA in 32 games with Norfolk. In the playoffs, he went 2–3 with a 2.61 GAA in five games. Anderson also made his NHL debut in 2002–03 with the Chicago Blackhawks. In his first NHL game on November 30, 2002, Anderson stopped all four shots he faced after replacing Jocelyn Thibault in the second period in a 4–1 loss to the Los Angeles Kings. Anderson then started his first NHL game the next night, on December 1, 2002, against the Mighty Ducks of Anaheim, where he made 23 saves in a 3–2 loss. Anderson finished the year 0–3–2 with the Blackhawks with a 4.00 GAA in six games with Chicago.

Anderson again split the 2003–04 season between the Admirals and Blackhawks. In 37 games with Norfolk, Anderson had a 17–20–0 record with a 2.11 GAA, followed by a 2–3 record and a 1.83 GAA in the playoffs. With the Blackhawks in 2003–04, Anderson went 6–14–0 with a 2.84 GAA in 21 games. After losing his first eight decisions with the team, Anderson won his first NHL game, and earned his first NHL shutout, as he made 30 saves in a 7–0 Blackhawks victory over the Columbus Blue Jackets on January 22, 2004.

With the 2004–05 NHL lockout cancelling the season, Anderson spent the entire season with Norfolk. Injuries, however, limited Anderson to only 15 games, where he had a 9–4–1 record and a 1.83 GAA for the Admirals. In six playoff games, Anderson was 2–4 with a 2.36 GAA.

Anderson spent the entire 2005–06 in the NHL, though he found himself claimed on the waiver wire three times. On January 19, 2006, the Boston Bruins claimed Anderson from the Blackhawks, then on January 31, the St. Louis Blues claimed Anderson from the Bruins. Four days later, on February 3, the Blackhawks claimed Anderson from the Blues. Despite all the movement, Anderson did not appear in any games with the Bruins or Blues. In 29 games with the Blackhawks as the primary backup to Nikolai Khabibulin, Anderson went 6–12–4 with a 3.32 GAA. On June 24, the Blackhawks traded Anderson to the Florida Panthers for the Panthers sixth-round draft pick in the 2008 NHL entry draft.

==== Florida Panthers (2006–2009) ====
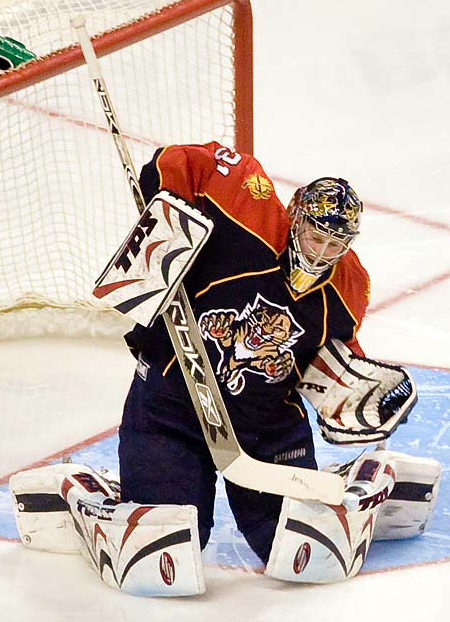
Anderson with the Florida Panthers in January 2008.

Anderson spent most of the 2006–07 season with the Florida Panthers' AHL affiliate, the Rochester Americans. In 34 games with Rochester, Anderson went 23–10–1 with a 2.56 GAA, then went 2–4 with a 2.87 GAA in six playoff games. Anderson also appeared in five NHL games with the Panthers in 2006–07, going 1–1–1 with a 2.21 GAA. He earned his first win as a Panther on March 28, 2007, as he made 33 saves in a 3–2 shootout victory over the Atlanta Thrashers.

In 2007–08, Anderson stayed with the Panthers for the entire season, as he was the backup goaltender to Tomáš Vokoun. In 17 games, Anderson went 8–6–1 with a 2.25 GAA and an impressive .935 save percentage. Anderson set an NHL record for the most saves in a shutout, as he stopped all 53 shots he faced in a 1–0 win over the New York Islanders on March 2, 2008. Anderson then had 40 saves in his next game, also a shutout victory, as Florida defeated the Boston Bruins 1–0 in overtime on March 4, 2008. That also set an NHL record for most saves in consecutive shutouts, with 93. Anderson's record of 53 saves in a single shutout, however, was broken when Mike Smith of the Phoenix Coyotes made a 54-save shutout against the Columbus Blue Jackets on April 3, 2012.

Anderson was the backup once again to Vokoun in 2008–09. He appeared in 31 games, however, due to an injury Vokoun suffered during the season. Anderson went 15–7–5 with a 2.71 GAA, as Florida narrowly missed the playoffs. After the season, Anderson became a free agent, and on July 1, 2009, he signed a two-year contract with the Colorado Avalanche.

==== Colorado Avalanche (2009–2011) ====
Anderson joined the Colorado Avalanche for the 2009–10 season and won the starting job from Peter Budaj in training camp. In his first season with the Avalanche, Anderson went 38–25–7 with a 2.64 GAA, .917 save percentage and seven shutouts, helping the team make a surprising run into the playoffs. He won his first game with the Avalanche in his first start, a 5–2 Avalanche victory over the San Jose Sharks on October 1, 2009. In his next start, Anderson recorded his first shutout with the team, stopping all 35 shots in a 3–0 win over the Vancouver Canucks on October 3, 2009. Anderson became the fourth goaltender in team history to win 30 or more games, joining Patrick Roy, David Aebischer and Peter Budaj. He set the team record for consecutive starts to begin the season, as he started the first 15 games. He led the NHL in saves with 2,047 and shots against with 2,233.

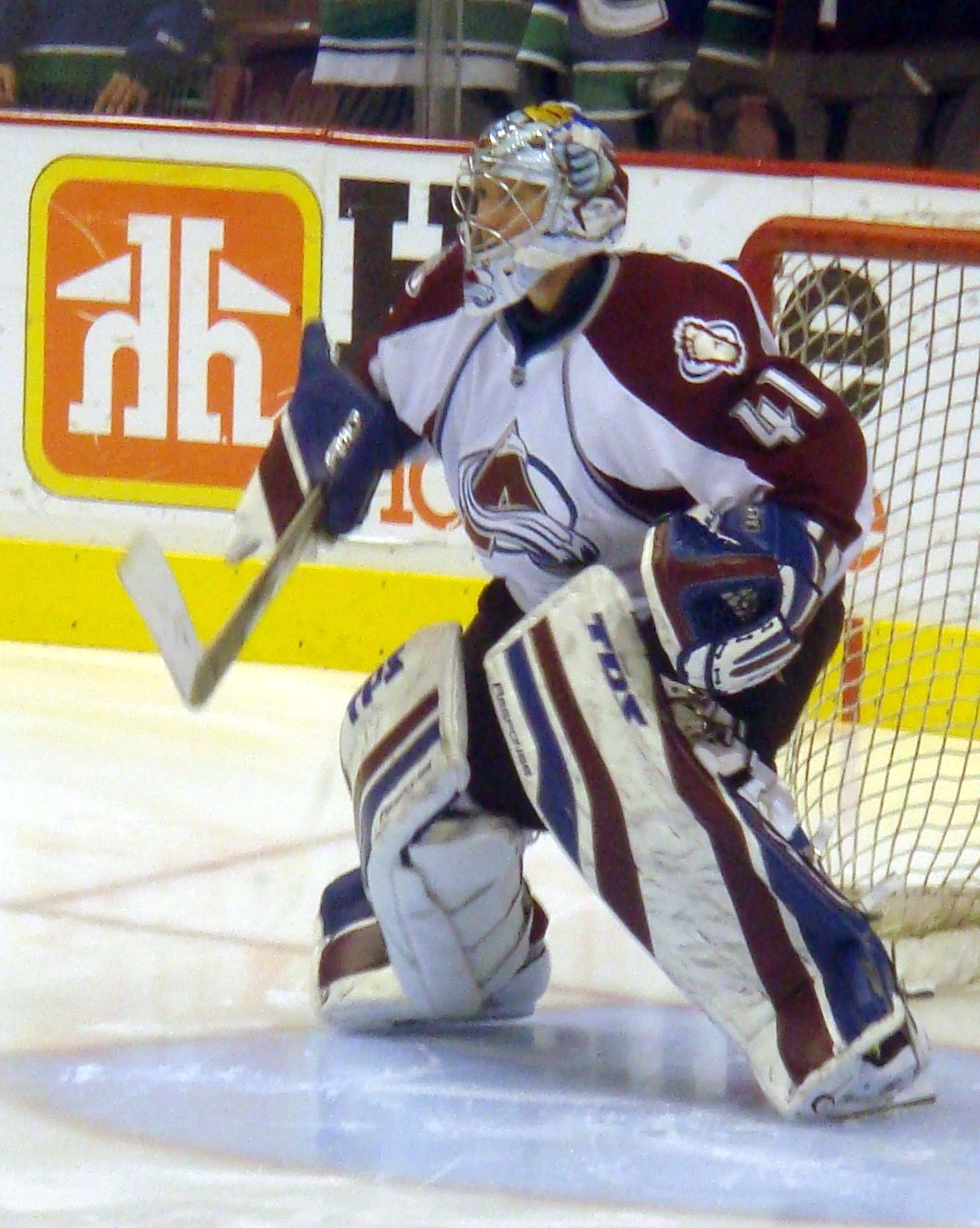
Anderson with the Colorado Avalanche in November 2009.

Anderson made his NHL playoff debut on April 14, 2010, as he made 25 saves in a 2–1 victory over the San Jose Sharks. Four nights later, Anderson recorded his first ever post-season shutout, as he stopped all 51 shots fired at him, as Colorado won the game 1–0 in overtime. The Sharks eventually defeated the Avalanche in six games, as Anderson had a 2–4 record with a 2.62 GAA and a .933 save percentage.

Anderson struggled to begin the 2010–11 season with the Avalanche and eventually lost his starting job to Peter Budaj. With Colorado quickly falling out of the playoff race, and Anderson struggling with a 13–15–3 record and a 3.28 GAA, the club traded him to the Ottawa Senators for Brian Elliott on February 18, 2011.

==== Ottawa Senators (2011–2020) ====
Anderson finished the 2010–11 season with the Ottawa Senators, going 11–5–1 in 18 games, earning a 2.05 GAA and a .939 save percentage. In his first game as a Senator, Anderson posted a 47-save performance to shut out the Toronto Maple Leafs on February 19, 2011. On March 21, Anderson signed a four-year contract extension with the club.

During the 2011–12 season, Anderson was among the league leaders for wins with 29 in 56 games before being sidelined in mid-February by a right hand injury sustained in a cooking accident. The Senators then acquired minor league goalie Ben Bishop from the St. Louis Blues near the trade deadline. Later in the season, Anderson's Senators faced the Eastern Conference's top seeded New York Rangers and took the series to seven games before losing 2–1 in the final game.

The lockout-shortened 2012–13 season started off very well for Anderson. In his first ten games of the season, he posted a record of 6–2–2 with a 1.49 GAA and .950 save percentage, earning consideration as an early Vezina Trophy favorite. He was named the NHL's first star for the month of January (2013). Anderson, however, suffered a sprained right ankle in a game against the New York Rangers on February 21, 2013, when he was knocked down by Rangers forward Chris Kreider after Krieder was tripped by a Senators player while moving toward the goal.

On August 25, 2014, the Senators announced they had signed Anderson to a three-year, $12.6 million contract extension, starting in the 2015–16 season. During the 2015 playoffs, Craig Anderson took over for Andrew Hammond in the first round after Hammond lost the first two games against the Canadiens. The Senators lost to the Canadiens in six games with Anderson posting a 2–2 record despite his 0.97 goals against average and .972 save percentage.

Anderson missed parts of the 2016–17 season as he took personal leave to support his wife in her battle with throat cancer. The Senators acquired Mike Condon from the Pittsburgh Penguins in exchange for a fifth-round draft pick in the 2017 draft due to both Anderson's personal leave and backup goalie Andrew Hammond being injured at the beginning of the season. Despite this, Anderson put up his best seasonal numbers since the 2012–13 season, with a 2.26 GAA and .926 save percentage in 40 games played. On March 11, 2017, Anderson set a team record for most wins by a goaltender when he won his 147th game, breaking the previous record set by Patrick Lalime. During the 2017 Stanley Cup playoffs, Anderson backed the Senators to an appearance in the Eastern Conference Final, losing to the Pittsburgh Penguins in seven games. Following the season, Anderson was the recipient of the 2016–17 Bill Masterton Memorial Trophy for perseverance, sportsmanship, and dedication to the sport of hockey. In September 2017, Anderson signed a two-year, $9.5 million contract, to begin in the 2018–19 season.

In June 2018, it was revealed that Anderson had quietly requested a trade from Ottawa, with his agent Justin Duberman being quoted as saying that his client "had expressed his desire to move on from the Senators." By August, Anderson had seemingly changed his mind and hinted that some well-publicized discord within the Senators organization, which culminated in forward Mike Hoffman leaving the team after his girlfriend had been accused of harassing the family of All-Star defenseman Erik Karlsson, had been behind his earlier request to be moved. With Hoffman's departure, Anderson stated that he had hoped the "drama" had ended and he could again focus on hockey.

On September 23, 2020, it was announced that the Senators would not renew Anderson's contract for the forthcoming 2020–21 NHL season. Despite Anderson's desire to continue his NHL career at the time, his struggling performance over the previous three seasons and relatively old age proved too much for the Senators, who had been proceeding in a complete roster rebuild during this time. At the time of the end of Anderson's tenure with the Senators, he led all franchise goaltenders in regular season wins, playoff wins (tied), and games played. Additionally, he ranked second in shutouts and playoff games played, behind only Patrick Lalime. After the announcement, Senators GM Pierre Dorion stated that Anderson is "the best goalie we've ever had."

==== Washington Capitals (2021) ====
On December 27, 2020, Anderson signed a professional tryout agreement with the Washington Capitals. On January 13, 2021, Anderson and the Capitals agreed on a one-year contract. He made his debut on February 7, against the Philadelphia Flyers, in relief for Vítek Vaněček. Anderson made his first start as a Capital on February 21, stopping 26 of 29 shots and earning his first victory with the team as Washington defeated the New Jersey Devils 4–3. On May 15, Anderson won his first playoff game since May 23, 2017, in relief of Vítek Vaněček. He made 22 saves and allowed one goal as the Capitals defeated the Boston Bruins 3–2 in overtime in Game 1 of the 2021 Stanley Cup playoffs.

==== Buffalo Sabres and retirement (2021–2023) ====
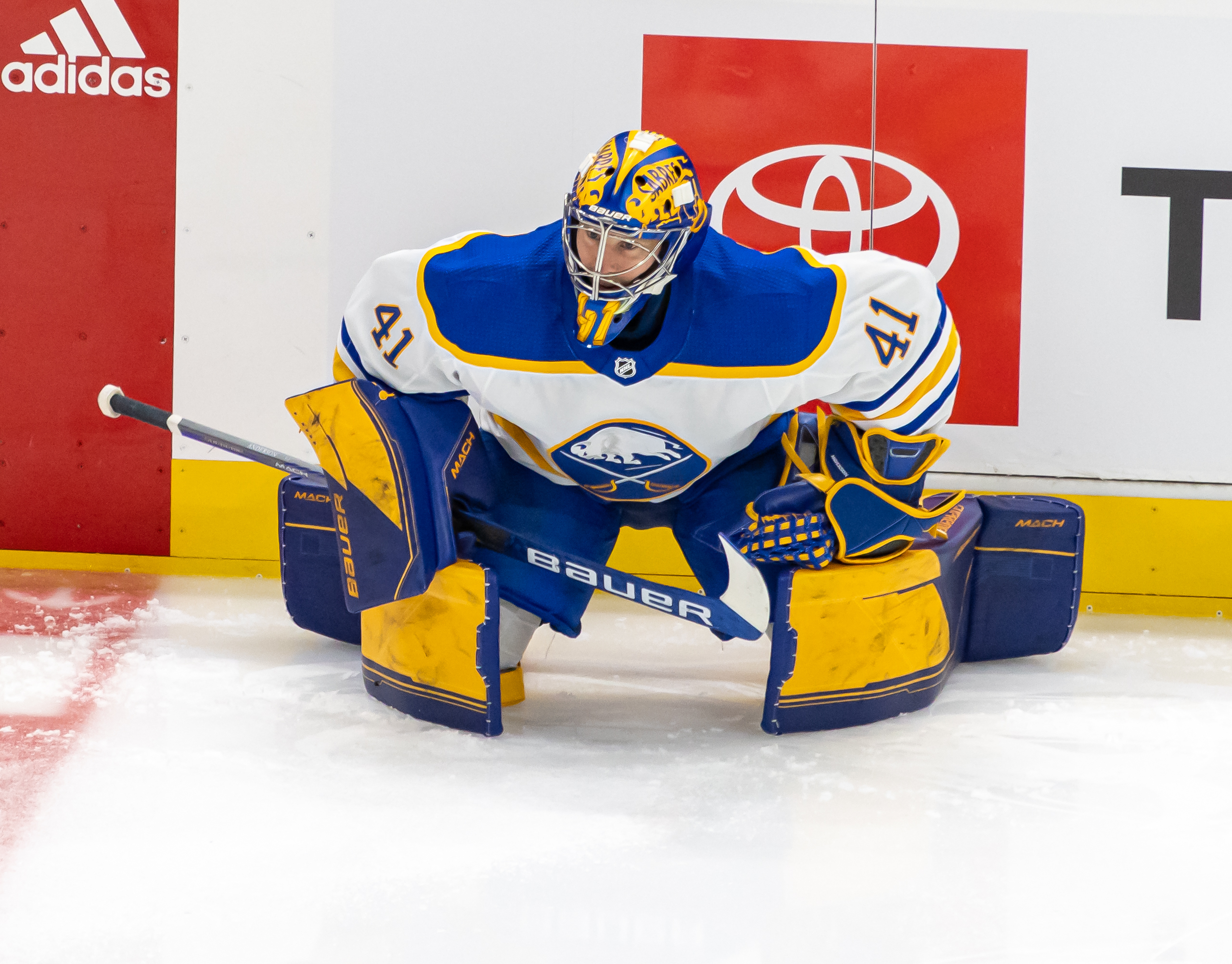
Anderson warming-up with the Sabres in October 2022

On July 28, 2021, Anderson extended his career in signing a one-year, $750,000 agreement as a free agent with the Buffalo Sabres. After a strong start, he was sidelined by a neck injury in November that caused him to miss three months of play. During the arduous rehabilitative process he briefly contemplated retiring, but continued on, partially in pursuit of his 300th win in the NHL.

Anderson secured his 300th NHL win in a March 10, 2022 victory over the Vegas Golden Knights. He became the thirty-ninth NHL goaltender to achieve the feat, and only the sixth American. On June 30, 2022, Anderson signed a one-year, $1.5 million contract extension with Buffalo, returning for his 20th NHL season.

On January 23, 2023, Anderson played in his 700th NHL game in a 3–2 win against the Dallas Stars. On April 13, 2023, Anderson played in his final NHL game, with the Sabres beating the Ottawa Senators 4–3 in overtime. Following the game, Anderson announced his retirement from professional hockey. He signed a one-day contract with Ottawa to retire a Senator on October 24, 2023.

== International play ==
Anderson played for the United States at the 2006 IIHF World Championship held in Riga, Latvia. In five games, Anderson went 3–2–0 with a 2.36 GAA; the U.S., however, finished in seventh place. Anderson once again represented the Americans at the 2008 IIHF World Championship held in Quebec City, Quebec, and Halifax, Nova Scotia, where he went 0–0–0 with a 5.63 GAA in two appearances as the U.S. finished in sixth place.

== Personal life ==
Anderson graduated from Barrington High School in 1999. He married his wife Nicholle in the summer of 2010. The couple have two sons.

On October 29, 2016, Nicholle Anderson was diagnosed with throat cancer. She revealed that she was cancer free in May 2017. After missing time to care for his wife and children, Anderson played a key role in Ottawa's run to the 2017 conference finals. On October 30, 2016, in his first game since learning of his wife's condition, Anderson shut out the Edmonton Oilers on the road, stopping all 37 shots he faced in a 2–0 win for the Senators. When Anderson was named as a "Star of the Game", the fans in Edmonton responded by giving him a standing ovation. On June 21, 2017, he won the Bill Masterton Memorial Trophy, for dedication to hockey.

Anderson has instructed goalie camps since being drafted in 2001. He currently instructs at Craig Anderson's Goalie School in Chicago during summers.

== Records ==
=== Ottawa Senators ===
- Lowest GAA in a season (1.69) (2012–13)
- Best save percentage in a season (.941) (2012–13)
- First Ottawa Senator to win the Bill Masterton Trophy

== Career statistics ==
=== Regular season and playoffs ===
Bold indicates season/playoff leader

			Regular season									Playoffs
Season	Team	League	GP	W	L	T/OT	MIN	GA	SO	GAA	SV%	GP	W	L	MIN	GA	SO	GAA	SV%
1998–99	Guelph Storm	OHL	21	12	5	1	1,006	52	1	3.10	.903	3	0	2	114	9	0	4.74	—
1999–00	Guelph Storm	OHL	38	12	17	2	1,955	117	0	3.59	.903	3	0	2	114	9	0	4.73	.875
2000–01	Guelph Storm	OHL	59	30	19	9	3,555	156	3	2.63	.918	4	0	4	240	17	0	4.25	.869
2001–02	Norfolk Admirals	AHL	28	9	13	4	1,568	77	2	2.95	.886	1	0	1	21	1	0	2.85	.938
2002–03	Chicago Blackhawks	NHL	6	0	3	2	270	18	0	4.00	.856	—	—	—	—	—	—	—	—
2002–03	Norfolk Admirals	AHL	32	15	11	5	1,795	58	4	1.94	.923	5	2	3	344	15	0	2.62	.920
2003–04	Norfolk Admirals	AHL	37	17	20	0	2,108	74	3	2.11	.914	5	2	3	327	10	0	1.83	.934
2003–04	Chicago Blackhawks	NHL	21	6	14	0	1,205	57	1	2.84	.905	—	—	—	—	—	—	—	—
2004–05	Norfolk Admirals	AHL	15	9	4	1	886	27	2	1.83	.929	6	2	4	356	14	0	2.35	.925
2005–06	Chicago Blackhawks	NHL	29	6	12	4	1,553	86	1	3.32	.886	—	—	—	—	—	—	—	—
2006–07	Rochester Americans	AHL	34	23	10	1	2,060	88	1	2.56	.919	6	2	4	376	18	0	2.87	.909
2006–07	Florida Panthers	NHL	5	1	1	1	217	8	0	2.21	.931	—	—	—	—	—	—	—	—
2007–08	Florida Panthers	NHL	17	8	6	1	935	35	2	2.24	.935	—	—	—	—	—	—	—	—
2008–09	Florida Panthers	NHL	31	15	7	5	1,636	74	3	2.71	.924	—	—	—	—	—	—	—	—
2009–10	Colorado Avalanche	NHL	71	38	25	7	4,235	186	7	2.63	.917	6	2	4	366	16	1	2.62	**.933**
2010–11	Colorado Avalanche	NHL	33	13	15	3	1,810	99	0	3.28	.897	—	—	—	—	—	—	—	—
2010–11	Ottawa Senators	NHL	18	11	5	1	1,055	36	2	2.05	.939	—	—	—	—	—	—	—	—
2011–12	Ottawa Senators	NHL	63	33	22	6	3,492	165	3	2.84	.914	7	3	4	419	14	1	2.00	.933
2012–13	Ottawa Senators	NHL	24	12	9	2	1,421	40	3	**1.69**	**.941**	10	5	4	578	29	0	3.01	.918
2013–14	Ottawa Senators	NHL	53	25	16	8	3,000	150	4	3.00	.911	—	—	—	—	—	—	—	—
2014–15	Ottawa Senators	NHL	35	14	13	8	2,093	87	3	2.49	.923	4	2	2	247	4	1	**0.97**	**.972**
2015–16	Ottawa Senators	NHL	60	31	23	5	3,478	161	4	2.78	.916	—	—	—	—	—	—	—	—
2016–17	Ottawa Senators	NHL	40	25	11	4	2,422	92	5	2.28	.926	19	11	8	1178	46	1	2.34	.922
2017–18	Ottawa Senators	NHL	58	23	25	6	3,251	180	2	3.32	.898	—	—	—	—	—	—	—	—
2018–19	Ottawa Senators	NHL	50	17	27	4	2,786	163	2	3.51	.903	—	—	—	—	—	—	—	—
2019–20	Ottawa Senators	NHL	34	11	17	2	1,845	100	0	3.25	.902	—	—	—	—	—	—	—	—
2020–21	Washington Capitals	NHL	4	2	1	0	169	6	0	2.13	.915	2	1	1	112	5	0	2.68	.929
2021–22	Buffalo Sabres	NHL	31	17	12	2	1,868	97	0	3.12	.897	—	—	—	—	—	—	—	—
2022–23	Buffalo Sabres	NHL	26	11	11	2	1,491	76	1	3.06	.908	—	—	—	—	—	—	—	—
NHL totals			709	319	275	73	40,228	1,916	43	2.86	.912	48	24	23	2,900	111	4	2.36	.929

=== International ===
Year	Team	Event	GP	W	L	T	MIN	GA	SO	GAA	SV%
2006	United States	WC	5	3	2	0	280	11	1	2.36	.908
2008	United States	WC	2	1	1	0	64	6	0	5.61	.714
Senior totals			7	4	3	0	344	17	1	2.97	–

== Awards and honours ==
Award	Year
OHL
OHL Goaltender of the Year	2001
OHL First All-Star Team	2001
NHL
Bill Masterton Memorial Trophy	2017

== See also ==
- List of NHL goaltenders with 300 wins
