= Pekka Rinne =

Finnish ice hockey player (born 1982)

- Hockey Hall of Fame, 2026
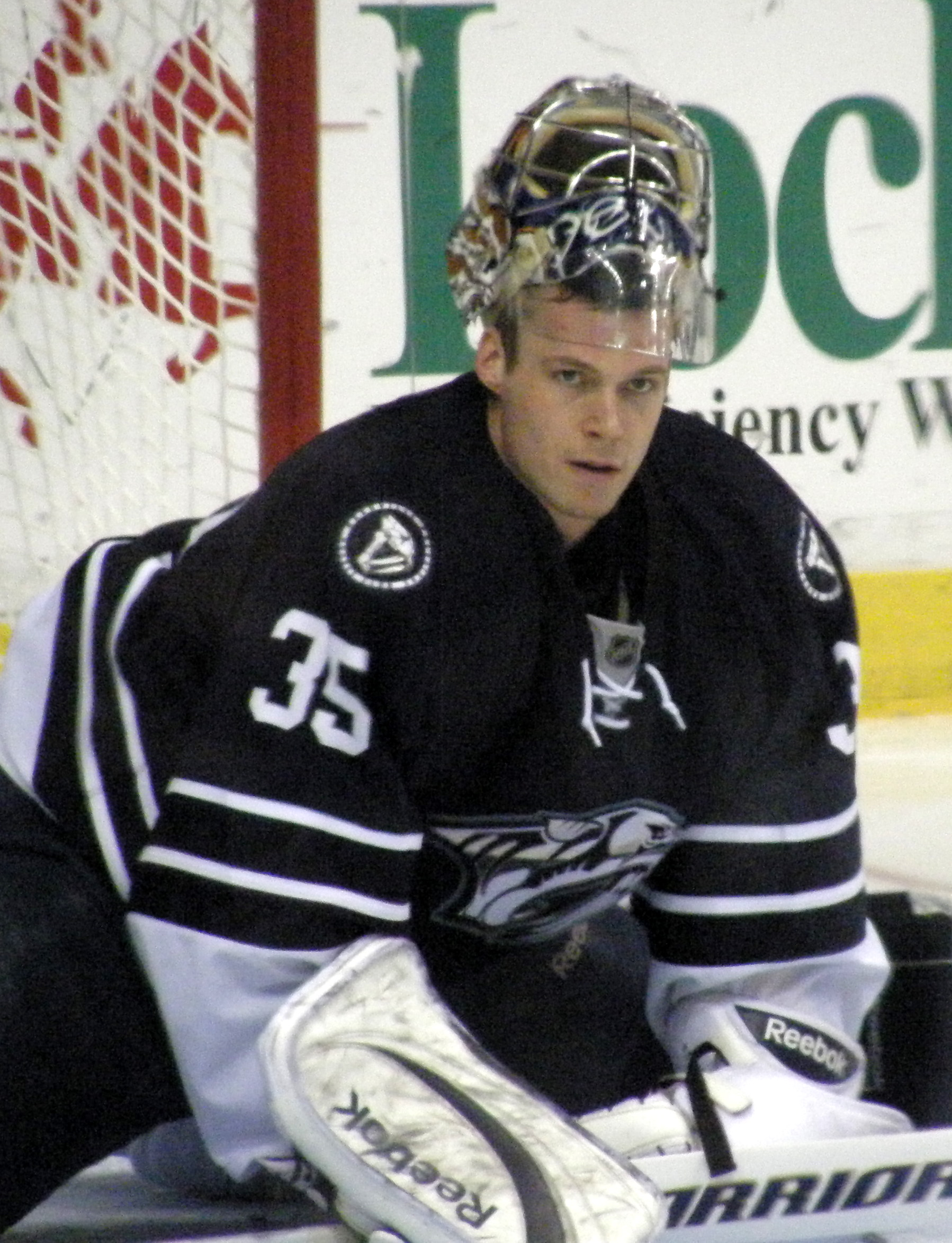
- Rinne with the Nashville Predators in February 2010
- Born: 3 November 1982 (age 44) Kempele, Finland
- Height: 196 cm (6 ft 5 in)
- Weight: 98.5 kg (217 lb; 15 st 7 lb)
- Position: Goaltender
- Caught: Left
- Played for: Oulun Kärpät; Nashville Predators; Dinamo Minsk
- National team: Finland
- NHL draft: 258th overall, 2004; Nashville Predators
- Playing career: 2002–2021
Medal record
Representing Finland
Men's ice hockey
World Championships
| Silver medal – second place | 2014 Belarus |

Pekka Päiviö Rinne (pronounced [ˈpekːɑ ˈrinːe]; born 3 November 1982) is a Finnish former professional ice hockey goaltender. Drafted by the Nashville Predators in the 2004 NHL entry draft, Rinne became their starting goaltender during the 2008–09 season and quickly established himself as one of the NHL's best goaltenders. He won the Vezina Trophy as the NHL's best goaltender in the 2017–18 season, and was a finalist for the award four times. Rinne led the Predators to their first Stanley Cup Final appearance in franchise history in 2017, losing to the Pittsburgh Penguins in six games.

Rinne is Nashville's franchise leader in wins and shutouts, and is a four-time NHL All-Star. He also holds the record for the most NHL wins by a Finnish-born goaltender. Rinne is one of only 17 NHL goaltenders to score a goal in either the regular season or the playoffs.

In March 2023, the Predators officially unveiled an 11-foot-11-inch (3.63 m) bronze statue of Rinne holding his stick and wearing his goaltender equipment, erected in front of the Predators' Bridgestone Arena in Nashville, to honour his legacy to the club and the city. Rinne was inducted into the Hockey Hall of Fame in 2026.

== Playing career ==
=== Oulun Kärpät ===
Pekka Rinne debuted in the SM-liiga with the Oulun Kärpät playing one game in the 2002–03 season. In the following season, he played 14 games, but he mainly served as the backup to Niklas Bäckström. At the end of the season, Kärpät were SM-liiga champions, and Rinne played two playoff games and didn't let in a single goal in either of them. He also appeared in eight games with the Kajaanin Hokki club in the Mestis as a loan player.

In the 2004–05 season, Rinne played 10 matches with Kärpät, but did not get the starting goaltender's place, because the top goalkeeper of the SM-liiga, Niklas Bäckström, played as the team's starter. After the season, the Nashville Predators, who drafted Rinne, offered him a two-way contract offer, which Rinne accepted.

=== Nashville Predators ===
==== Early seasons in Nashville (2005–2010) ====
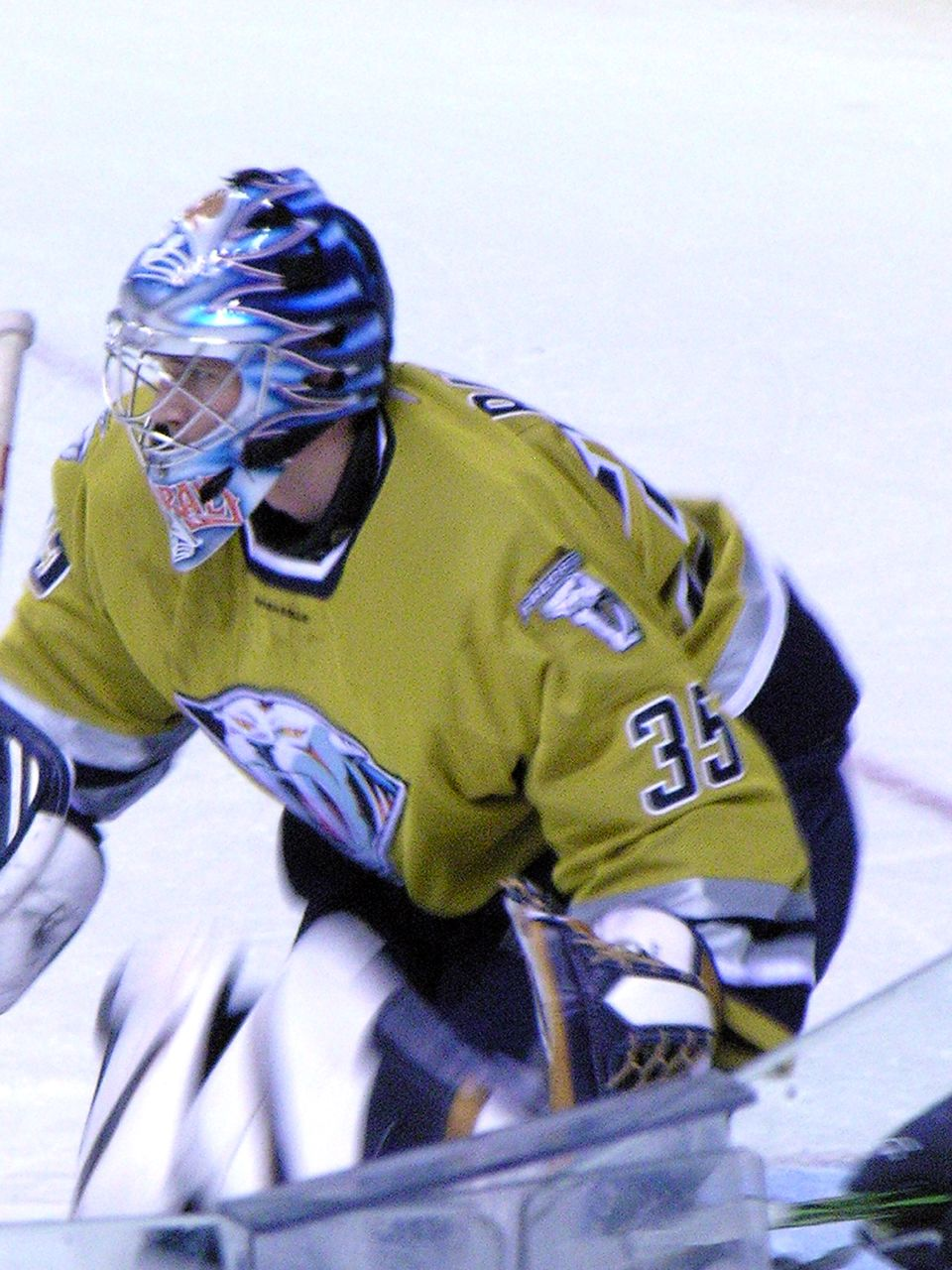
Rinne with the Nashville Predators in December 2005. He played his first two NHL games during the 2005–06 season.

Rinne was drafted 258th overall in the eighth round of the 2004 NHL entry draft by the Nashville Predators. He was signed by the Predators on 23 August 2005, and began his North American playing career with the Predators' top minor league affiliate, the Milwaukee Admirals of the American Hockey League (AHL). Initially, Rinne was slated to be the backup for Brian Finley, but Rinne became the starter as a consequence of Finley's poor play. In the summer of 2006, Rinne was "roughed up by a couple of unknown assailants" and during the fight, he dislocated his shoulder. As a result, he had to have surgery and missed the first four months of the season.

Rinne appeared in two NHL games with Nashville during the 2005–06 season. He compiled a record of 1–1–0 with a .900 save percentage and a goals against average (GAA) of 3.80.

Following Dan Ellis's stellar performance for Nashville in the 2007–08 season, starter Chris Mason was traded to the St. Louis Blues and Rinne was called up to serve as backup to Ellis for the subsequent 2008–09 season.

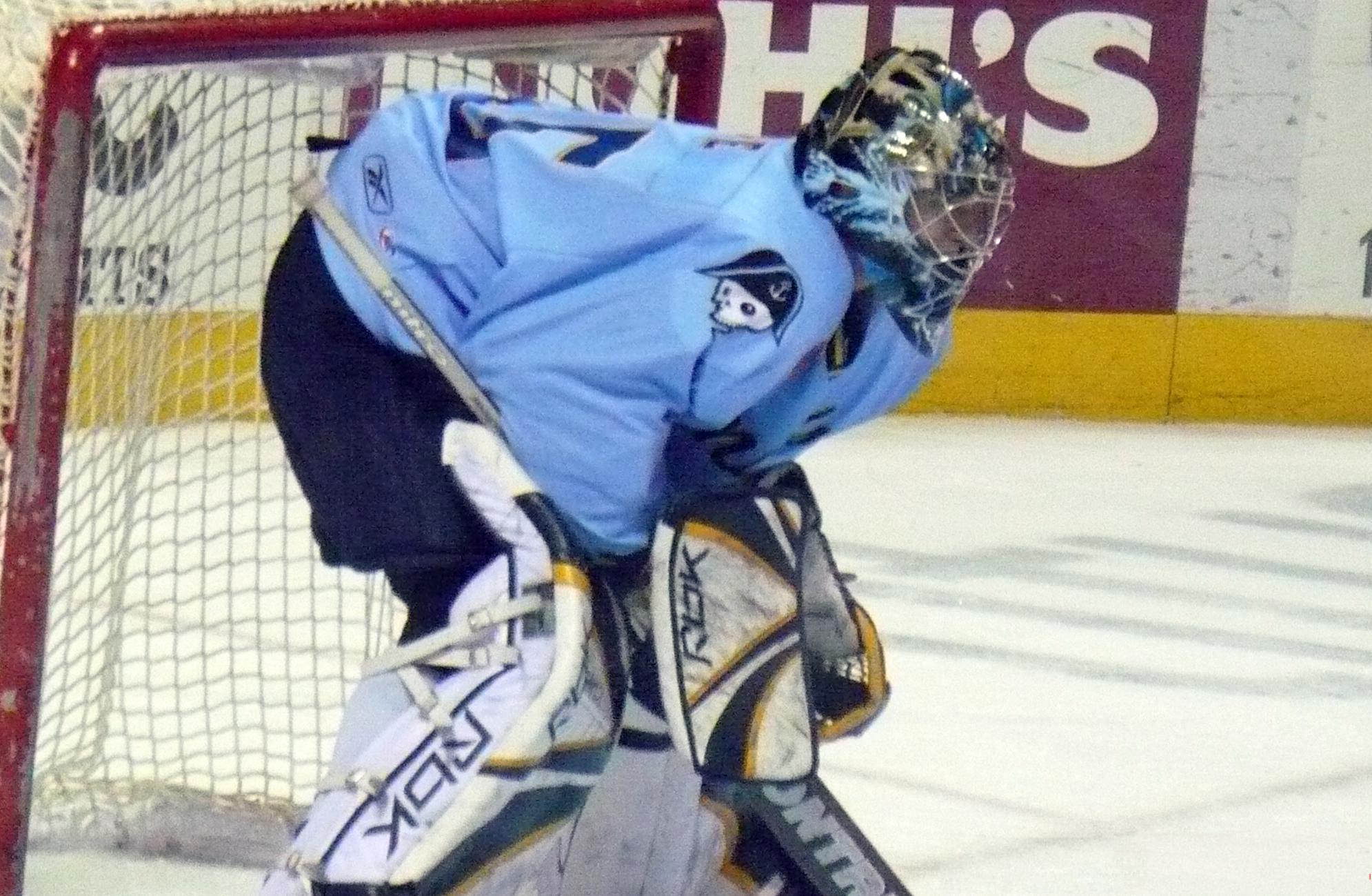
Rinne with the Milwaukee Admirals in February 2008. He served as the Predators' back-up goaltender in the latter half of 2007–08 season.

On 1 December 2008, Rinne became only the second Predators rookie goaltender ever to record a shutout. In February 2009, Rinne recorded 9 wins in 12 games and had a .944 save percentage and a 1.72 GAA. He was selected as the NHL Rookie of the Month for his performances. On 14 March, Rinne set a Predators franchise record with his seventh shutout of the season. Rinne was one of two goaltenders to play for Finland in the 2009 IIHF World Championship of hockey, the other being Karri Rämö. Rinne started the tournament with a shutout in his first game for the Finns, saving 30 shots.

==== Starter, Stanley Cup Final run, Vezina Trophy (2010–2018) ====
In the 2010–11 season opener, Rinne allowed a goal before colliding with Anaheim Ducks forward Troy Bodie and suffering a lower-body injury on the play. Anders Lindbäck relieved him and went on to start three games before Rinne returned, only to go down to injury again in December. Upon returning on 23 December, Rinne remained healthy and put up some of the best numbers of his career, including a 1.71 GAA and .946 save percentage in January. At the conclusion of the season came many accolades; Rinne was named one of the three finalists for the Vezina Trophy, conferred to the NHL's top goaltender as judged by the NHL's general managers which was eventually awarded to Tim Thomas of the Boston Bruins. He also finished fourth in Hart Memorial Trophy voting, as the NHL's most valuable player, and was named an NHL second team All-Star. Rinne led the Predators to their first ever Stanley Cup playoff series win in franchise history in 2011, prevailing over the Anaheim Ducks via a 4–2 series win before getting defeated in the second round by the Presidents' Trophy-winning Vancouver Canucks.

After shutting-out the Ducks on 29 October 2011, Rinne set the mark for the Predators franchise record for shutouts, with 22. On Rinne's 29th birthday, 3 November 2011, he signed a seven-year $49 million contract, the largest contract in Nashville Predators team history (since surpassed by teammate Shea Weber and his 13-year, $114 million contract). That night, Rinne posted a 35-save shutout on the road against the Phoenix Coyotes. During the 2011–12 season, Rinne set a franchise record with 11 consecutive wins, passing Tomáš Vokoun's previous mark of eight. Rinne had another excellent year in 2011–12, leading the NHL in wins, shots against, saves and games played. On 25 April 2012, Rinne was again named a finalist for the Vezina Trophy for the second consecutive year which ultimately went to Henrik Lundqvist of the New York Rangers. He also helped the Predators get past the Detroit Red Wings in the 2012 playoffs to win the series 4–1. However, Rinne and the Predators were unable to advance any further, falling to the Phoenix Coyotes in five games in the second round for a second consecutive season.

On 25 September 2012, Rinne joined Belarusian club Dinamo Minsk of the Kontinental Hockey League (KHL) due to the impending 2012–13 NHL lockout. However, he left Dinamo in December and returned to the Predators at the end of the lockout in January 2013 to begin the shortened, 48-game 2012–13 season.

In May 2013, Rinne had a hip arthroscopy. The hip then became infected on 24 October 2013, leaving Rinne off the ice and undergoing rigorous rehabilitation for the remainder of the year. He returned to action on 5 March 2014 against the Pittsburgh Penguins, allowing three goals in a 3–1 loss.

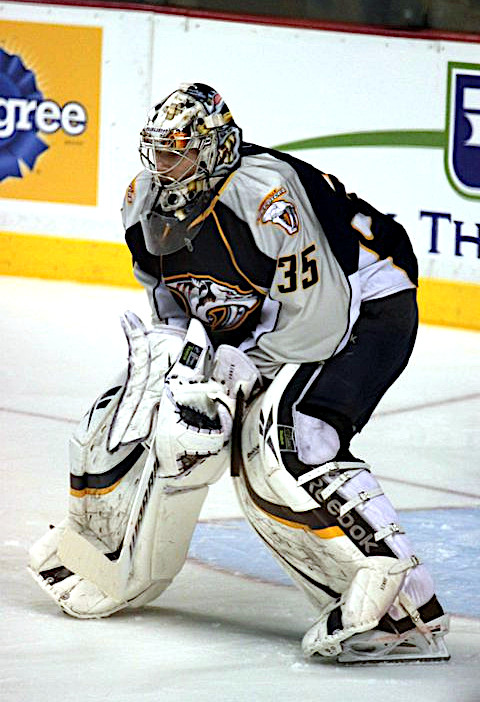
Rinne with Nashville in May 2011.

On 14 March 2015, Rinne became the fastest goaltender, in terms of games played, to record 30 wins in 39 games since the NHL adopted the shootout, and just the third goaltender in the NHL's expansion era to record 30 wins in 39 games or less. Rinne was a nominee for the 2015 Bill Masterton Memorial Trophy, which eventually went to veteran player Jaromír Jágr. Rinne was also a Vezina Trophy finalist in 2015, marking his third career nomination for the award; he lost to the Montreal Canadiens' Carey Price.

On 16 March 2017, Rinne became the 67th goaltender to play at least 500 NHL games. Rinne recorded his first two career shutouts in the first two games of the opening round of the 2017 playoffs after the Predators won game one 1–0 and game two 5–0, respectively. On 22 May, Rinne backstopped the Predators to the 2017 Stanley Cup Final by defeating the Anaheim Ducks four games to two. The Predators lost the Stanley Cup Final against the Pittsburgh Penguins four games to two.

On 24 November 2017, the Predators defeated the St. Louis Blues 2–0; the shutout was the 45th of Rinne's career, making him the NHL's all-time leader amongst Finnish-born goaltenders. On 22 February 2018, Rinne became the 34th goaltender to record 300 career NHL wins following a 7–1 victory over the San Jose Sharks. When he recorded his 300th win, he had the third-highest win percentage of all goaltenders with at least 300 wins, at 54.34%, behind only Martin Brodeur and Marc-André Fleury. On 17 April, Rinne was again named a finalist for the Vezina Trophy, which he won on 20 June.

==== Final years (2018–2021) ====
On 3 November 2018, Rinne signed a two-year, $10 million contract extension with Nashville. That night, as was the case in 2011, Rinne posted a 26-save shutout over the visiting Boston Bruins in Nashville.

On 9 January 2020, Rinne became the 12th goaltender in NHL history and the second goaltender in Predators history to score a goal, doing so against the Chicago Blackhawks by shooting the puck into the empty net from behind his team's goal line with less than 22 seconds left in the game.

On 10 May 2021, in the final game of the COVID-shortened 2020–21 season, Rinne posted a 30-save shutout in a 5–0 win over the Carolina Hurricanes. It was his 369th career win, tying him for 19th all-time with Tom Barrasso. It was also his 60th career shutout, passing Evgeni Nabokov for 19th all-time on that list as well.

=== Retirement ===
On 13 July 2021, Rinne announced his retirement from professional hockey. The Predators also announced that Rinne's number 35 jersey would be retired on 24 February 2022, making him the first player in team history to receive the honour.

Following nearly four years out of the sport, on 10 February 2025, Rinne signed a one-game contract with Kiekko-Ketut of the III-divisioona^{[fi]}, his youth team. Rinne played on 15 February, marking his first start in an ice hockey game of any level in four years since his retirement with the Nashville Predators. In a ceremony held prior to the game, Kiekko-Ketut retired Rinne's jersey number, which bore the same no. 35 he wore with the Predators. Rinne stopped 44 out of 46 shots in a 7–2 victory against Haapajärvi Kiilai.

== International play ==
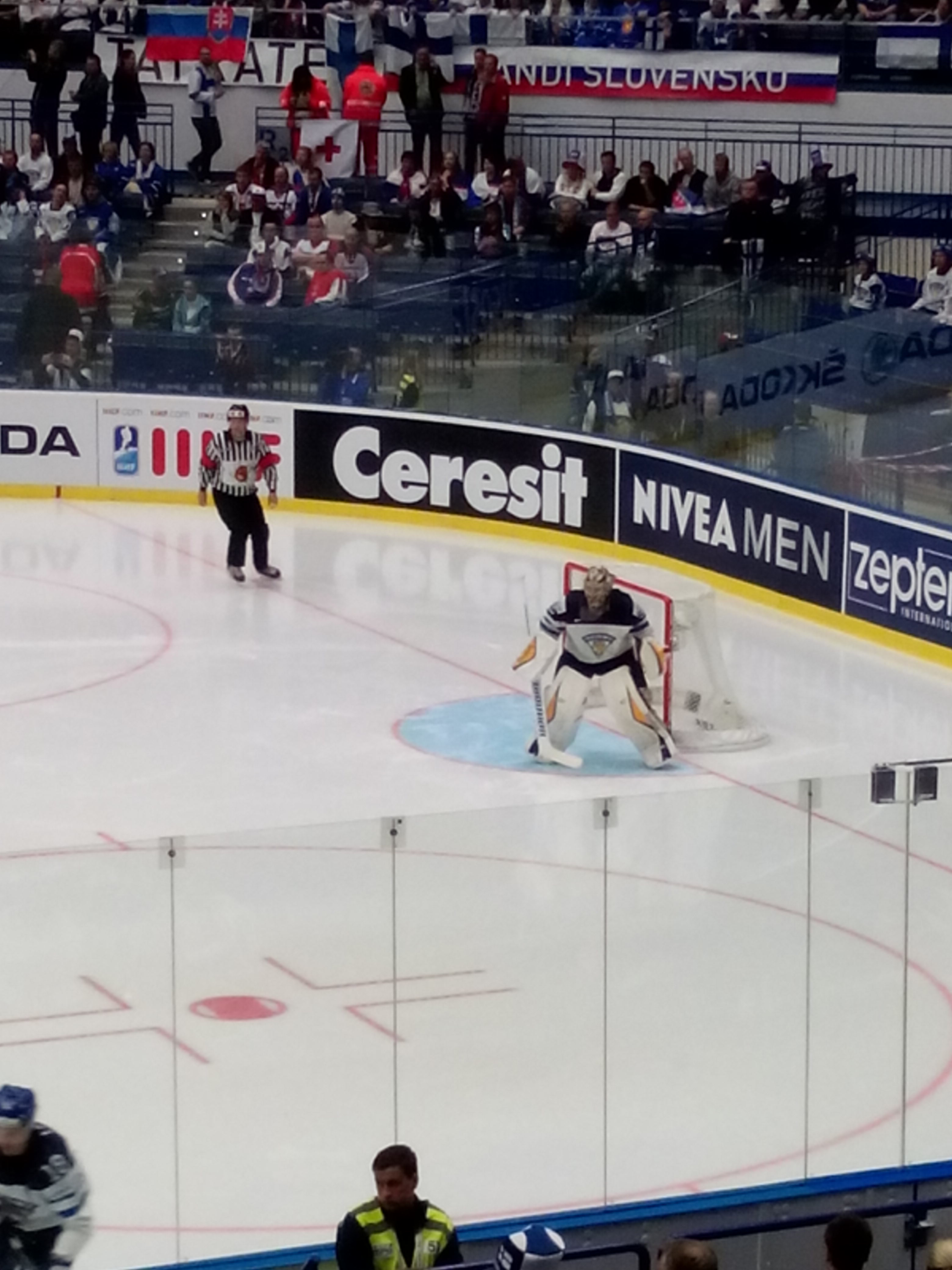
Rinne with the Finnish national hockey team during the 2015 IIHF World Championship

In May 2014, Rinne was named to the All-Star team and selected as the Most Valuable Player of the 2014 IIHF World Championship as Finland claimed the silver medal. Rinne also participated in the 2015 IIHF World Championship the following year and was named the tournament's best goaltender, setting a new International Ice Hockey Federation (IIHF) record for minutes played without allowing a goal.

In March 2016, Rinne was named to Finland's 2016 World Cup of Hockey roster. He played in one out of three tournament games and in two out of three pre-tournament games.

== Coaching career ==
In the 2022–23 season, Rinne was the goaltender coach of the Finnish under-20 national team. In June 2023, the Nashville Predators hired Rinne as the team's European scout and goaltender development coach.

== Playing style ==
Rinne utilized the popular butterfly style of goaltending, dropping to his knees early and using his leg pads to block low shot attempts. At 6 ft 5 in (1.96 m), Rinne was among the tallest goaltenders in the league, which gave him tremendous reach with his stick and leg pads. For a tall goaltender, he utilized great footwork, had a great glove hand, but played with a smaller stick than most goaltenders did.

== Personal life ==
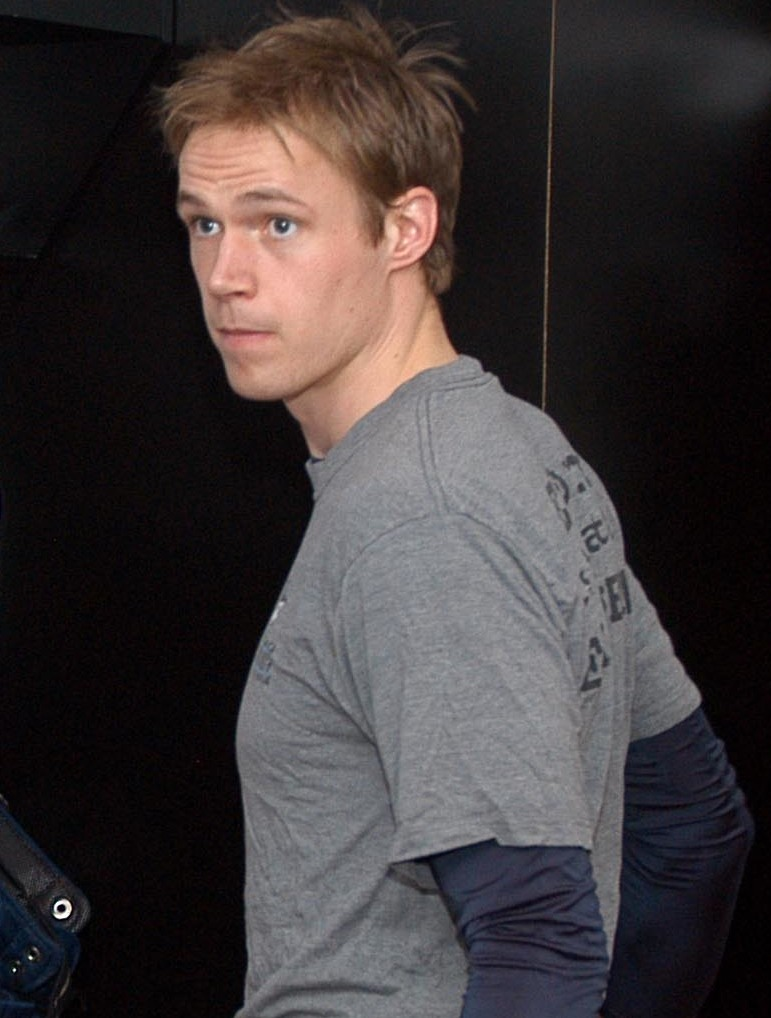
Rinne in 2008

Rinne is the son of Jukka and Helena Rinne, and he has two sisters, Anna and Päivi. As a child, Rinne idolized John Vanbiesbrouck.

Rinne was engaged to The Voice of Finland contestant Kirsi Lehtosaari in April 2013. Lehtosaari reported in engagement announcements that living in a music city like Nashville helped her aspiration to become a pop star. She planned to continue her music interests in Nashville until the end of Rinne's NHL career. Rinne, likewise, planned to return to Finland after his retirement. However, their engagement was called off around July 2015.

Rinne has two sons with his fiancée, Erika.

== Career statistics ==
=== Regular season and playoffs ===
Bold indicates led league

| | | | Regular season | | | | | | | | | Playoffs |
| Season | Team | League | GP | W | L | T/OT | MIN | GA | SO | GAA | SV% | GP | W | L | MIN | GA | SO | GAA | SV% |
|---|---|---|---|---|---|---|---|---|---|---|---|---|---|---|---|---|---|---|---|
| 2002–03 | Kärpät | SM-l | 1 | 0 | 1 | 0 | 60 | 3 | 0 | 3.00 | .893 | — | — | — | — | — | — | — | — |
| 2003–04 | Kärpät | SM-l | 14 | 5 | 4 | 4 | 824 | 41 | 0 | 2.99 | .897 | 2 | 1 | 0 | 22 | 0 | 0 | 0.00 | 1.000 |
| 2003–04 | Hokki | Mestis | 8 | — | — | — | — | — | — | 2.07 | .942 | — | — | — | — | — | — | — | — |
| 2004–05 | Kärpät | SM-l | 10 | 8 | 0 | 1 | 572 | 16 | 0 | 1.68 | .927 | — | — | — | — | — | — | — | — |
| 2005–06 | Milwaukee Admirals | AHL | 51 | 30 | 18 | 2 | 2960 | 139 | 2 | 2.82 | .904 | 14 | 10 | 4 | 734 | 35 | 3 | 2.86 | .905 |
| 2005–06 | Nashville Predators | NHL | 2 | 1 | 1 | 0 | 63 | 4 | 0 | 3.80 | .900 | — | — | — | — | — | — | — | — |
| 2006–07 | Milwaukee Admirals | AHL | 29 | 15 | 7 | 6 | 1670 | 65 | 3 | 2.34 | .920 | 4 | 0 | 4 | 247 | 12 | 0 | 2.91 | .895 |
| 2007–08 | Milwaukee Admirals | AHL | 65 | 36 | 24 | 3 | 3840 | 158 | 5 | 2.47 | .908 | 6 | 2 | 4 | 358 | 15 | 1 | 2.51 | .923 |
| 2007–08 | Nashville Predators | NHL | 1 | 0 | 0 | 0 | 29 | 0 | 0 | 0.00 | 1.000 | — | — | — | — | — | — | — | — |
| 2008–09 | Nashville Predators | NHL | 52 | 29 | 15 | 4 | 2999 | 119 | 7 | 2.38 | .917 | — | — | — | — | — | — | — | — |
| 2009–10 | Nashville Predators | NHL | 58 | 32 | 16 | 5 | 3246 | 137 | 7 | 2.53 | .911 | 6 | 2 | 4 | 358 | 16 | 0 | 2.68 | .911 |
| 2010–11 | Nashville Predators | NHL | 64 | 33 | 22 | 9 | 3789 | 134 | 6 | 2.12 | .930 | 12 | 6 | 6 | 748 | 32 | 0 | 2.57 | .907 |
| 2011–12 | Nashville Predators | NHL | **73** | **43** | 18 | 8 | 4169 | 166 | 5 | 2.39 | .923 | 10 | 5 | 5 | 609 | 21 | 1 | 2.07 | .929 |
| 2012–13 | HC Dinamo Minsk | KHL | 22 | 9 | 11 | 2 | 1327 | 68 | 1 | 3.08 | .897 | — | — | — | — | — | — | — | — |
| 2012–13 | Nashville Predators | NHL | 43 | 15 | 16 | **8** | 2444 | 99 | **5** | 2.43 | .910 | — | — | — | — | — | — | — | — |
| 2013–14 | Nashville Predators | NHL | 24 | 10 | 10 | 3 | 1367 | 63 | 2 | 2.77 | .902 | — | — | — | — | — | — | — | — |
| 2013–14 | Milwaukee Admirals | AHL | 2 | 2 | 0 | 0 | 121 | 2 | 0 | 0.99 | .943 | — | — | — | — | — | — | — | — |
| 2014–15 | Nashville Predators | NHL | 64 | 41 | 17 | 6 | 3851 | 140 | 4 | 2.18 | .923 | 6 | 2 | 4 | 425 | 19 | 0 | 2.68 | .909 |
| 2015–16 | Nashville Predators | NHL | 66 | 34 | 21 | **10** | 3871 | **161** | 4 | 2.48 | .908 | 14 | 7 | 7 | 866 | 37 | 0 | 2.63 | .906 |
| 2016–17 | Nashville Predators | NHL | 61 | 31 | 19 | 9 | 3568 | 144 | 3 | 2.42 | .918 | **22** | **14** | **8** | **1289** | 42 | 2 | 1.96 | .930 |
| 2017–18 | Nashville Predators | NHL | 59 | 42 | 13 | 4 | 3475 | 134 | **8** | 2.31 | .927 | 13 | 7 | 6 | 685 | 35 | 2 | 3.07 | .904 |
| 2018–19 | Nashville Predators | NHL | 56 | 30 | 19 | 4 | 3220 | 130 | 4 | 2.42 | .918 | 6 | 2 | 4 | 330 | 17 | 0 | 3.09 | .905 |
| 2019–20 | Nashville Predators | NHL | 36 | 18 | 14 | 4 | 1988 | 105 | 3 | 3.17 | .895 | — | — | — | — | — | — | — | — |
| 2020–21 | Nashville Predators | NHL | 24 | 10 | 12 | 1 | 1310 | 62 | 2 | 2.84 | .907 | — | — | — | — | — | — | — | — |
| NHL totals | | | 683 | 369 | 213 | 75 | 39,413 | 1,598 | 60 | 2.43 | .917 | 89 | 45 | 44 | 5,310 | 220 | 5 | 2.50 | .913 |

=== International ===
| Year | Team | Event | Result | GP | W | L | T | MIN | GA | SO | GAA | SV% |
|---|---|---|---|---|---|---|---|---|---|---|---|---|
| 2009 | Finland | WC | 5th | 6 | 4 | 2 | 0 | 373 | 12 | 1 | 1.93 | .926 |
| 2010 | Finland | WC | 6th | 4 | 2 | 2 | 0 | 249 | 7 | 1 | 1.68 | .929 |
| 2014 | Finland | WC | 2nd place, silver medalist(s) | 9 | 5 | 3 | 0 | 543 | 17 | 3 | 1.88 | .928 |
| 2015 | Finland | WC | 6th | 7 | 3 | 2 | 0 | 427 | 12 | 3 | 1.69 | .927 |
| 2016 | Finland | WCH | 8th | 1 | 0 | 1 | 0 | 60 | 4 | 0 | 4.00 | .907 |
| Senior totals | | | | 27 | 14 | 10 | 0 | 1652 | 52 | 8 | 1.88 | .926 |

== Awards ==
=== NHL ===
| Award | Year(s) awarded |
|---|---|
| NHL YoungStars Game at 2009 NHL All-Star Game | 2009 |
| Rookie of the Month, February | 2009 |
| NHL second All-Star team | 2011 |
| The Hockey News Patrick Roy Award | 2013 |
| NHL All-Star Game | 2015, 2016, 2018, 2019 |
| Vezina Trophy | 2018 |
| NHL first All-Star team | 2018 |
| NHL Fan Choice Award (Goal of the Year) | 2020 |
| King Clancy Memorial Trophy | 2021 |

=== International ===
| Award | Year(s) awarded |
|---|---|
| Oddset Hockey Games winner | 2014 |
| World Championship All-Star team | 2014 |
| World Championship Most Valuable Player | 2014 |
| World Championship Best Goaltender | 2015 |
| Finnish Player of the Year | 2017 |
| IIHF All-Time Finland Team | 2020 |

=== SM-Liiga ===
| Award | Year(s) awarded |
|---|---|
| Kanada-malja champion | 2004, 2005 |

Awards and achievements
| Preceded by Sergei Bobrovsky | Winner of the Vezina Trophy; 2018 | Succeeded by Andrei Vasilevskiy |
| Preceded by Matt Dumba | King Clancy Memorial Trophy winner 2021 | Succeeded by P.K. Subban |
