= Sergei Bobrovsky =

Russian ice hockey player (born 1988)

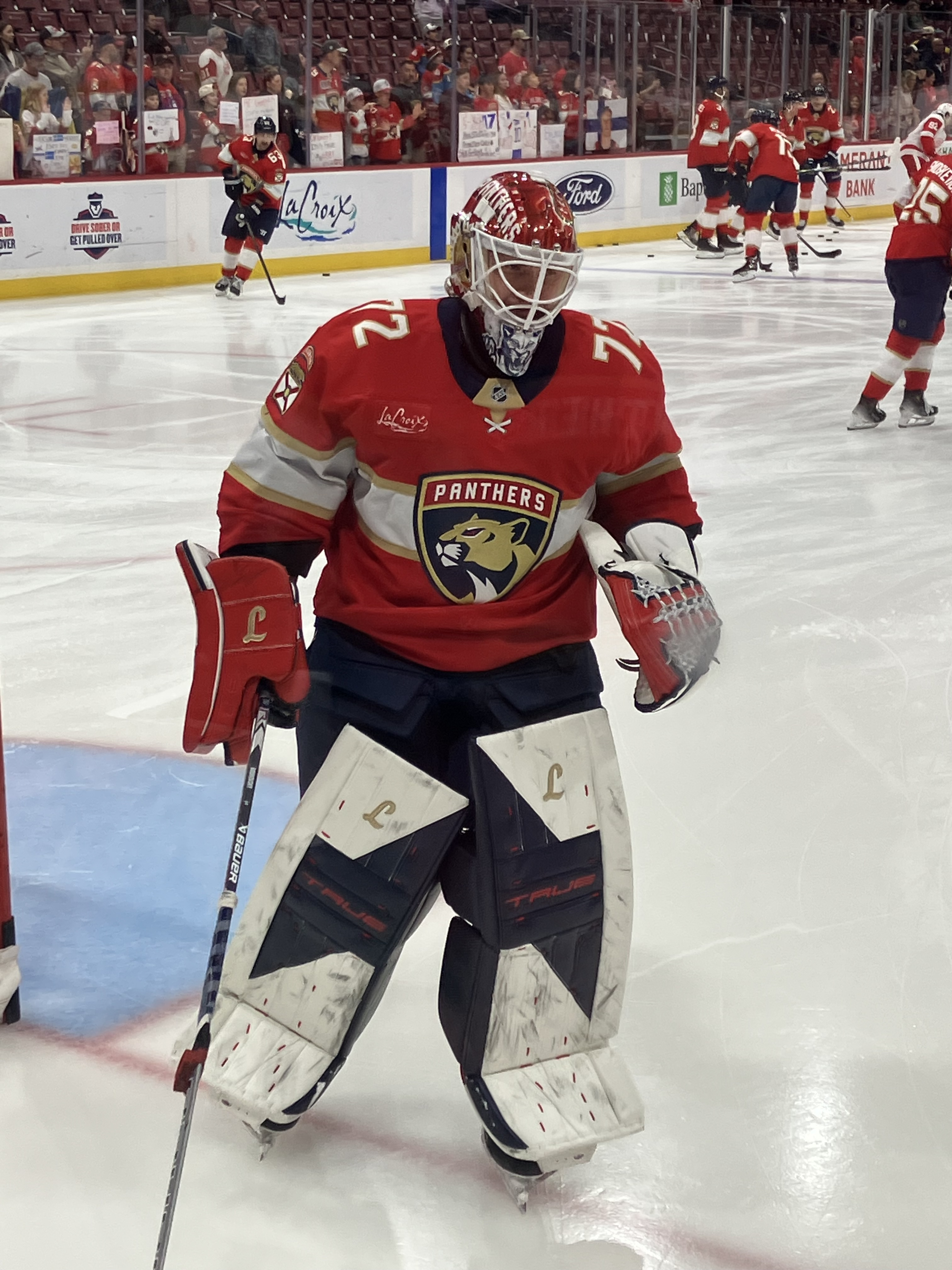
- Bobrovsky with the Florida Panthers in April 2025
- Born: 20 September 1988 (age 38) Novokuznetsk, Russian SFSR, Soviet Union
- Height: 6 ft 2 in (188 cm)
- Weight: 182 lb (83 kg; 13 st 0 lb)
- Position: Goaltender
- Catches: Left
- NHL team Former teams: Toronto Maple Leafs; Metallurg Novokuznetsk; Philadelphia Flyers; SKA Saint Petersburg; Columbus Blue Jackets; Florida Panthers
- National team: Russia
- NHL draft: Undrafted
- Playing career: 2006–present

Sergei Andreyevich Bobrovsky (Russian: Серге́й Андреевич Бобровский; born 20 September 1988) is a Russian professional ice hockey player who is a goaltender for the Toronto Maple Leafs of the National Hockey League (NHL). He has also played in the NHL for the Philadelphia Flyers, Columbus Blue Jackets, and Florida Panthers. Bobrovsky is a two-time Vezina Trophy winner, winning in the 2012–13 and 2016–17 seasons while a member of the Blue Jackets. After signing with Florida in 2019, Bobrovsky backstopped the Panthers to back-to-back Stanley Cup championships in 2024 and 2025.

In February 2023, Bobrovsky achieved the most wins for a Russian goaltender in NHL history, surpassing Evgeni Nabokov. As of 2026, Bobrovsky has the seventh most wins of any goaltender in league history.

== Playing career ==
=== Philadelphia Flyers (2010–2012) ===
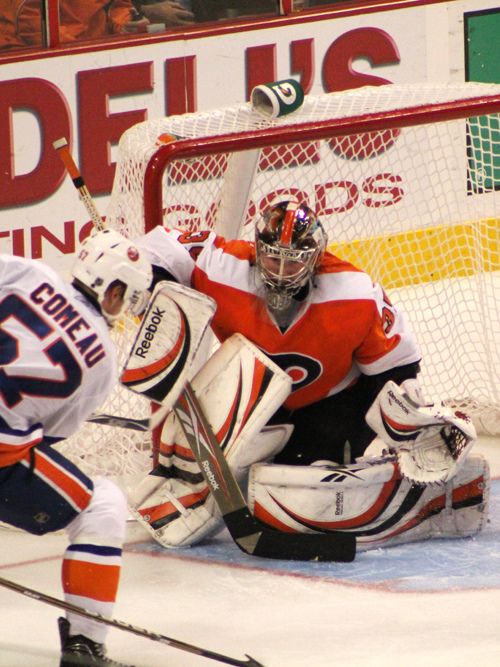
Bobrovsky with the Philadelphia Flyers in October 2010. The Flyers signed Bobrovsky to a three-year, entry-level contract earlier that year.

Bobrovsky was not drafted into the NHL, and did not speak much English when he first got to the league. Philadelphia Flyers general manager Paul Holmgren has said that the Flyers considered drafting him during the 2006 NHL entry draft, but ultimately decided not to given the difficulty of signing Russian players at the time. After playing his first four professional seasons with Metallurg Novokuznetsk in Russia, Bobrovsky signed a three-year, entry-level contract with the Flyers on 6 May 2010. He was initially slated to begin his North American career with the American Hockey League (AHL)'s Adirondack Phantoms, but after impressing coaches during training camp, Bobrovsky replaced the injured starter Michael Leighton on the roster. After Leighton recovered, Bobrovsky continued to share goaltending duties with Brian Boucher.

Flyers head coach Peter Laviolette named Bobrovsky the starting goaltender for the opening game of the 2010–11 season against the Pittsburgh Penguins on 7 October 2010. In his NHL debut, Bobrovsky picked up a 3–2 win and was named the game's first star in the first regular season game at Pittsburgh's Consol Energy Center. At 22 years and 17 days, he became the youngest goaltender to win a season-opening game for the Flyers, eclipsing Ron Hextall, who started at 22 years and 159 days on 9 October 1986. Bobrovsky was also the first Flyers rookie goaltender to win his NHL debut since Antero Niittymäki did so in 2004. Bobrovsky enjoyed a successful rookie season, posting a 28–13–8 record along with a .915 save percentage. After a disappointing showing during the playoffs, however, in which he was often benched in favour of backup Brian Boucher, the Flyers signed Ilya Bryzgalov to a nine-year contract to be their new starting goaltender.

=== Columbus Blue Jackets (2012–2019) ===
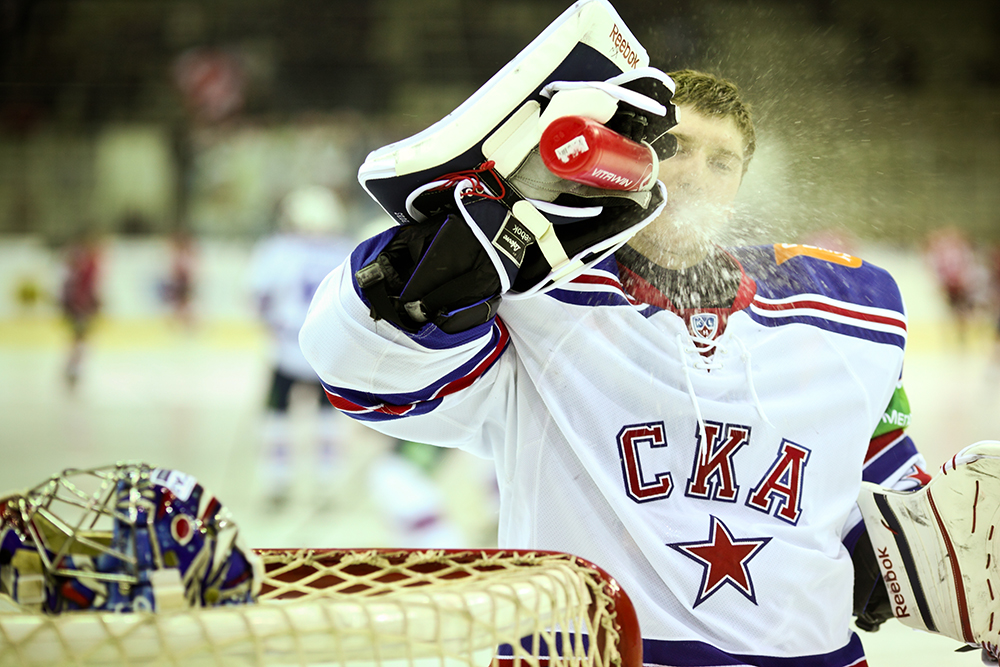
Bobrovsky in December 2012. He signed with SKA Saint Petersburg for the duration of the 2012–13 NHL lockout.

After a season backing-up Bryzgalov, on 22 June 2012, Bobrovsky was traded to the Columbus Blue Jackets in exchange for Columbus' 2012 second-round pick, a 2012 fourth-round pick, and the Phoenix Coyotes' 2013 fourth-round pick.

As a result of the 2012–13 NHL lockout, Bobrovsky signed a contract with SKA Saint Petersburg of the Kontinental Hockey League (KHL), but returned to the Blue Jackets when the lockout finished. After splitting time early in the season, Bobrovsky supplanted Steve Mason as Columbus' starting goaltender; it was Bobrovsky's first time as a starter since his rookie season in Philadelphia. Bobrovsky was instrumental in the Blue Jackets' push for a playoff spot, which ultimately came up just short as the team finished in ninth place in the Western Conference. Despite this, Bobrovsky had 21 wins, and career bests of a 2.00 goals against average (GAA) and a .932 save percentage. With this performance, he was awarded the Vezina Trophy, awarded to the league's top goaltender during the regular season.

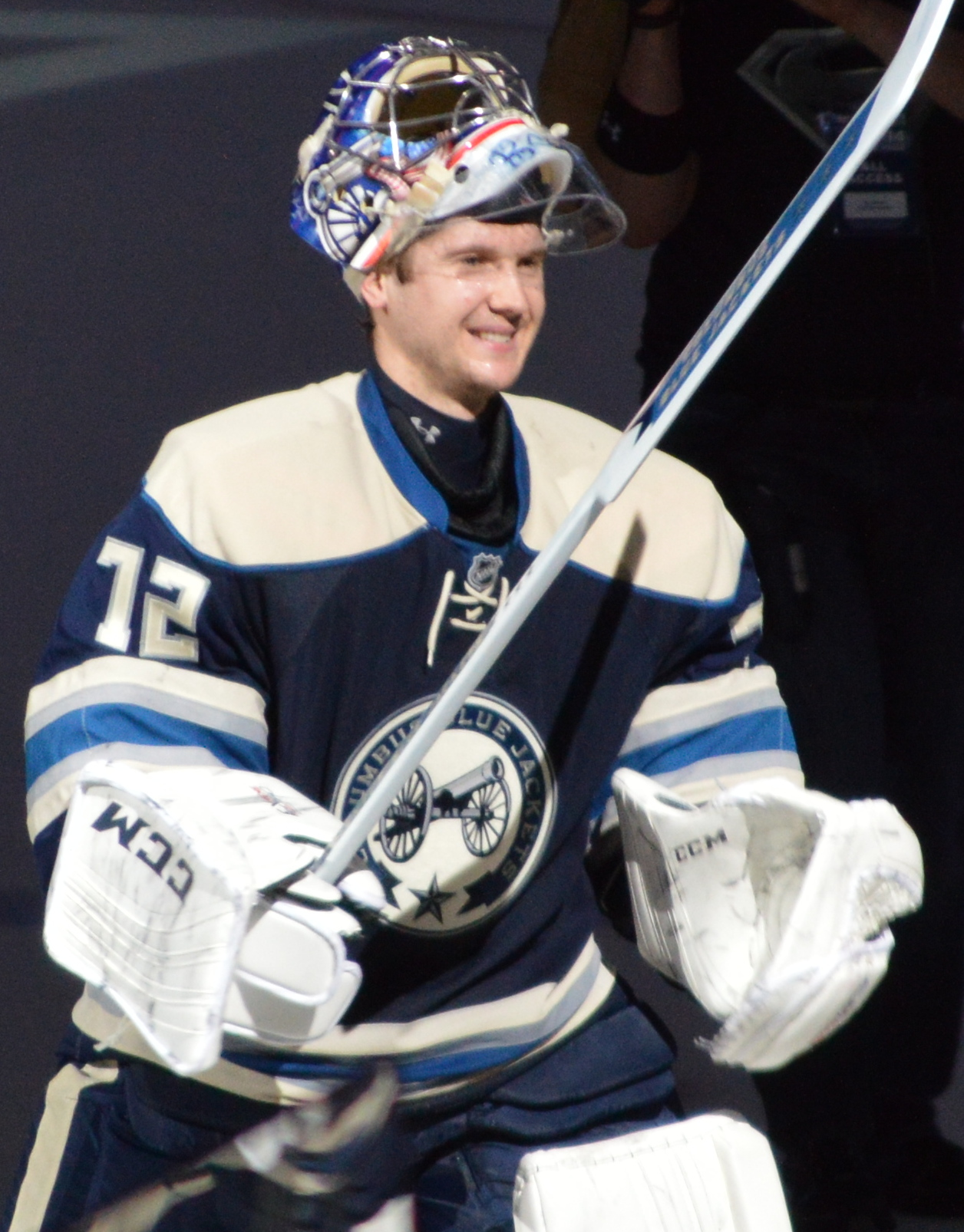
Bobrovsky with the Columbus Blue Jackets in January 2014. He signed a two-year contract with the Blue Jackets the previous off-season.

On 1 July 2013, Bobrovsky signed a two-year, $11.25 million contract extension with the Blue Jackets.

On 3 July 2013, he was named to the NHL first All-Star team. On 3 December, Bobrovsky was injured in a game against the Tampa Bay Lightning and would be out for four-to-five weeks. He returned to action on 6 January 2014, against the New York Rangers, earning a shootout victory by the score of 4–3. Bobrovsky also made a robbing glove save in the shootout on former Blue Jackets forward star Rick Nash, which was considered to be the game-saving save.

Bobrovsky backstopped the Blue Jackets in the 2014 playoffs, where they played the Pittsburgh Penguins in the Eastern Conference quarterfinals. On 19 April 2014, the Blue Jackets won their first playoff game in franchise history in game two of the series, 4–3, followed by their second-ever playoff victory in game four. Bobrovsky played well in game five, saving 48 of 50 shots for a 0.960 save percentage, although the Blue Jackets lost the game 3–1. The Blue Jackets were ultimately eliminated in game six on 28 April, losing 4–3.

During the 2016–17 season, Bobrovsky posted a record of 41–17–5, good enough for second in the league while also setting a Blue Jackets franchise record for wins in a season by a goaltender. He also posted a 2.06 GAA, .931 save percentage (both of which led the league among qualifying goaltenders) and recorded seven shutouts (third in the league). He, along with the Washington Capitals' Braden Holtby, were the only goaltenders in the league to be in the top-five in each goaltender statistic category. For his efforts, Bobrovsky was rewarded with his second Vezina Trophy. Bobrovsky was also named a finalist for the Hart Memorial Trophy as the most valuable player of the regular season alongside Pittsburgh Penguins centre and captain Sidney Crosby and Edmonton Oilers centre and captain Connor McDavid, which eventually ended with McDavid winning the award while Crosby finished second in the voting and Bobrovsky finishing third in the voting. However, Bobrovsky's regular season success did not carry over to the 2017 playoffs—in a 4–1 series loss to the Pittsburgh Penguins, Bobrovsky won only one game, posting a 3.88 GAA and .882 save percentage.

A 37–22–6 record during the 2017–18 season was once again good enough to propel the Blue Jackets to a playoff spot as the seventh seed in the Eastern Conference. They faced the second-seeded and eventual Stanley Cup champion Washington Capitals in the first round, falling in six games. Bobrovsky posted a 3.18 goals-against-average during the playoffs.

The Blue Jackets narrowly qualified for the postseason the next year as the eighth and final seed in the Eastern Conference, behind Bobrovsky's 37 wins. The Blue Jackets upset the Presidents' Trophy-winning Tampa Bay Lightning, sweeping them in four games. The win marked the first series win in franchise history. They faced the third-seeded Boston Bruins in the second round, falling in six games. Bobrovsky posted a 2.41 goals against average and .925 save percentage during the playoffs.

=== Florida Panthers (2019–2026) ===
On 1 July 2019, Bobrovsky signed a seven-year, $70 million contract with the Florida Panthers. On 10 February 2020, Bobrovsky played his 500th NHL game as the Panthers lost 4–1 to the Philadelphia Flyers. He struggled through a down year, posting a record of 23–16–9 through 50 games in the 2019–20 regular season before the onset of the COVID-19 pandemic shut down the league. His 3.23 GAA and .900 save percentage were both his worst since 2011–12, his last year before joining the Blue Jackets. Bobrovsky started all four games of the 2020 Stanley Cup playoffs Qualifying Round against the New York Islanders, allowing 12 goals as the Panthers dropped the series to the Islanders 3–1.

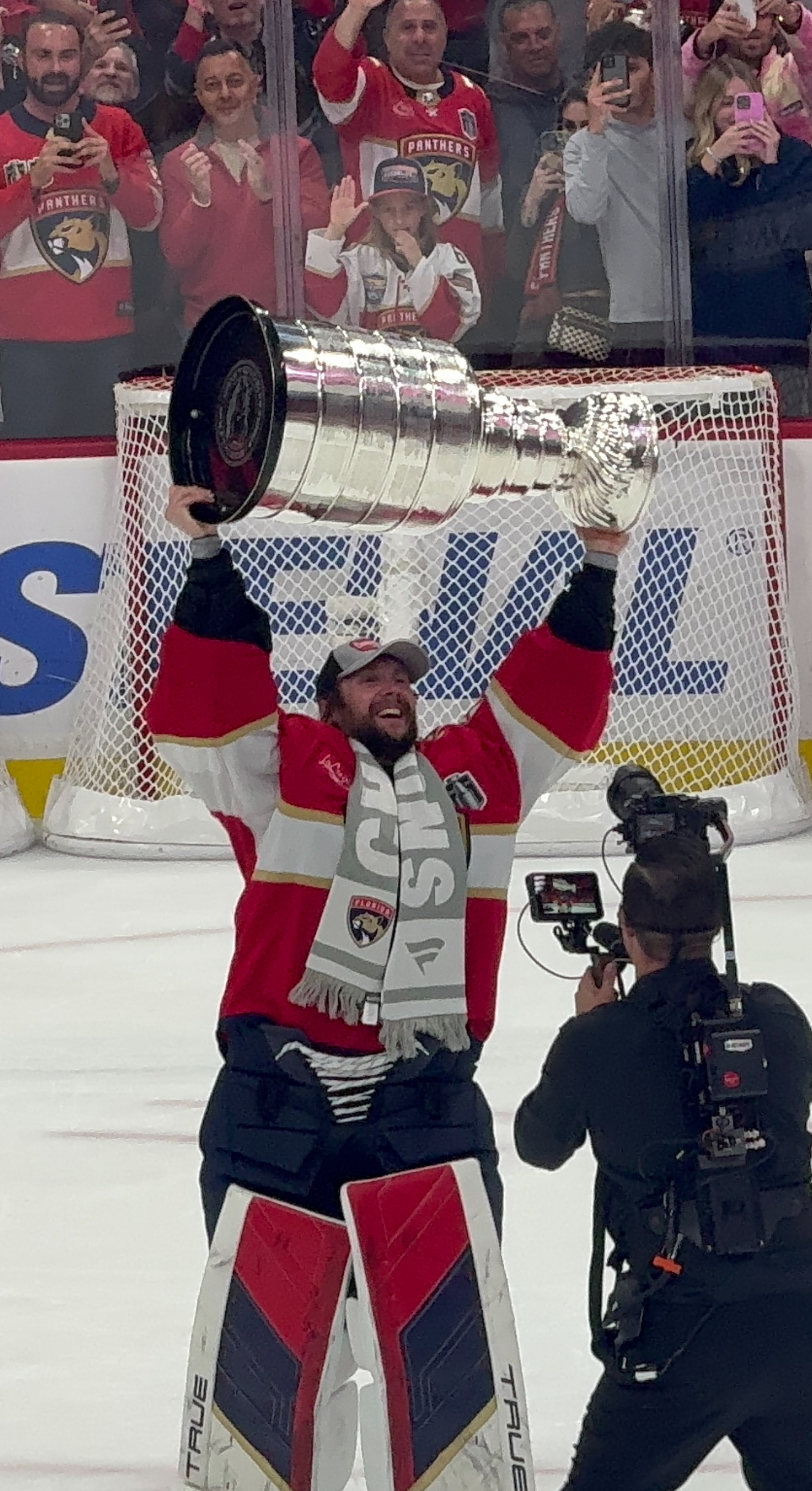
Bobrovsky celebrates with the Stanley Cup in June 2024, after the Panthers won the 2024 Stanley Cup Final.

The NHL resumed the 2020–21 season in a divisional format in light of the pandemic. Bobrovsky recorded a 19–8–2 record with a 2.91 GAA and .906 save percentage, improving on his prior year's results, but the 2021 playoffs saw the Panthers defeated by the Lightning in the first round, with Bobrovsky recording a .841 save percentage over three games before losing the net to backup Chris Driedger.

After two seasons with disappointing results, Bobrovsky's contract with the Panthers became a subject of considerable debate as to its value and whether it was hindering the team's results.

The 2021–22 season saw a turnaround in regular-season results for Bobrovsky, who led the league in wins (39) as the Panthers won the Presidents' Trophy as the best team of the regular season. In the 2022 playoffs, the Panthers defeated the eighth-seeded Washington Capitals in the first round in six games, the team's first series win since 1996. They were then swept by the two-time defending Stanley Cup champion and fifth-seeded Tampa Bay Lightning in the second round.

==== Stanley Cup Final loss, back-to-back Final wins ====
In the 2022 off-season, it was reported that the team was contemplating attempting to move Bobrovsky's contract, while noting that this was difficult in light of both his salary and his no-movement clause. The 2022–23 season began poorly for Bobrovsky, and for the team as a whole, with many speculating that he was losing the net to backup Spencer Knight. He gradually recovered his form, while Knight eventually took time away from the team for undisclosed health reasons. Bobrovsky was stricken by illness late in the season, at which point AHL goaltender Alex Lyon took over as the team's starting goaltender, leading the team on a lengthy winning streak that would ultimately see them qualify for the eighth and final spot in the 2023 playoffs. Bobrovsky praised Lyon, saying he "basically saved our season." Lyon continued in the starting role even after Bobrovsky returned to the roster, including in the opening games of the first round playoff series against the Presidents' Trophy-winning Boston Bruins. However, with the Bruins leading the Panthers two games to one following game three, coach Paul Maurice opted to return Bobrovsky to the net, stating that he felt Lyon was fatigued. The Panthers were defeated 6–2 in game four, putting them in a 3–1 series deficit and placing them on the brink of elimination. Bobrovsky's fortunes changed immediately thereafter, first carrying the team on a three-game winning streak to overtake the Bruins, who were the favourites to win the Stanley Cup, and advance to the second round. The Panthers then faced the Toronto Maple Leafs in the second round, winning that series in five games to advance to the Eastern Conference Final against the Carolina Hurricanes. The first game of the Conference Final went to quadruple overtime, with both Bobrovsky and Hurricanes goaltender Frederik Andersen praised for their performances, before the Panthers prevailed with seconds remaining in the seventh period of play. It was to that point the sixth-longest game in NHL history. He recorded his first-ever playoff shutout in game three, in which the Panthers took a stranglehold 3–0 series lead. They went on to sweep the Hurricanes in four games, with Bobrovsky stopping 174 of the 180 shots he faced in the series for a .966 save percentage. Bobrovsky struggled in the 2023 Stanley Cup Final against the Vegas Golden Knights, being pulled from game two after allowing four goals on 13 shots against and the Panthers would eventually fall to the Knights in five games.

Bobrovsky enjoyed success during the following 2023–24 season, with the Panthers allowing only 200 goals across 82 games, the second-fewest in the league behind the Winnipeg Jets (who allowed 199). He and backup goaltender Anthony Stolarz thus missed sharing the William M. Jennings Trophy by one goal. Bobrovsky was also named a finalist for the Vezina Trophy for the third time in his career, which eventually went to Hellebuyck. He made a shutout in game one of the Stanley Cup Final against the Edmonton Oilers, winning 3–0. Three games later, in game four, Bobrovsky gave up five goals on 16 shots against the Oilers in an 8–1 defeat and got pulled off for the first time in the playoffs not because of extra-attacker reasons. He would win the Stanley Cup for the first time in his career three games later in a winner-take-all game seven. He was the second player to hoist the Cup, receiving it first from Panthers captain Aleksander Barkov.

On 24 October 2024, Bobrovsky made 24 saves in a 3–1 win over the New York Rangers, earning his 400th career win and becoming the fastest in NHL history to do so. Bobrovsky helped the Panthers repeat as Stanley Cup champions in the 2024–25 season when Florida once again defeated the Edmonton Oilers in six games in the 2025 Stanley Cup Final.

During a 19 January 2026, game against the San Jose Sharks, Bobrovsky fought Sharks' goaltender Alex Nedeljkovic during the third period after teammate Evan Rodrigues checked Vincent Desharnais from behind. It was the first NHL goaltender fight since 2020 when Mike Smith fought Cam Talbot. Both Nedeljkovic and Bobrovsky each received seven minutes of penalties for the fight, comprising two minutes for leaving their creases to fight and five minutes for the fight proper. Neither goaltender was ejected from the game.

=== Toronto Maple Leafs (2026–present) ===
Upon the expiry of his seven-year contract with the Panthers, Bobrovsky and the team failed to reach terms after Bobrovsky was reportedly seeking a large extension. After being connected to the Toronto Maple Leafs leading up to unrestricted free agency, Bobrovsky and the Maple Leafs agreed to a three-year, $21 million contract in the opening hours of 1 July free agency.

== International play ==
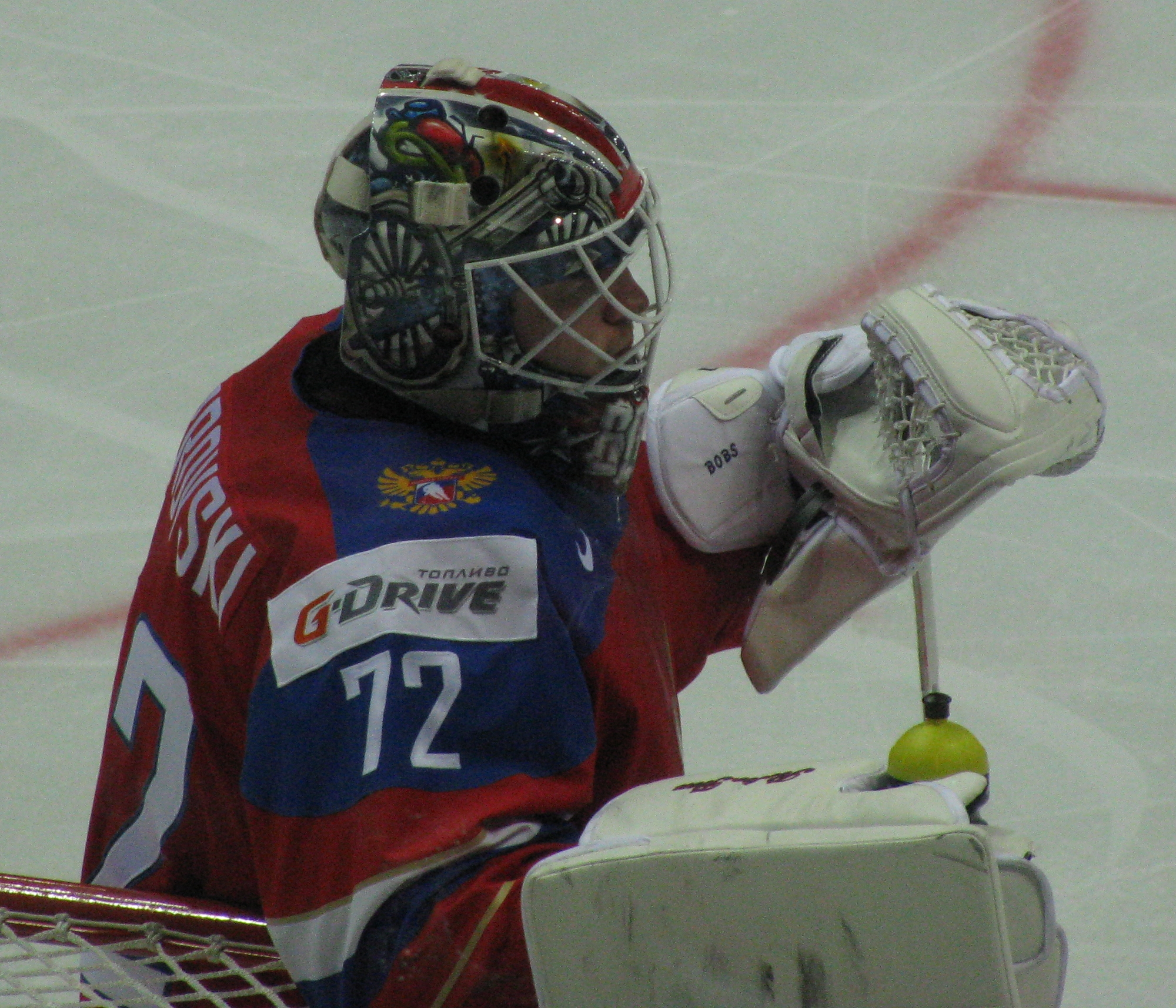
- Bobrovsky with the Russia national men's ice hockey team during the 2016 IIHF World Championship

Medal record

Men's ice hockey

Representing Russia

World Championships
| Gold medal – first place | 2014 Belarus | |
| Silver medal – second place | 2015 Czech Republic | |
| Bronze medal – third place | 2016 Russia | |

World Junior Championships
| Bronze medal – third place | 2008 Czech Republic | |

Bobrovsky participated in the 2007 Super Series, an eight-game series between Canadian and Russian junior teams commemorating the 35th anniversary of the 1972 Summit Series, and garnered the most ice-time of any goaltender. At the end of that year, he played in the 2008 World Junior Championships, backstopping Russia junior team to a bronze medal.

Bobrovsky was named as one of Russia senior team's goaltenders for the 2014 Winter Olympics; he and Semyon Varlamov split time tending the net. After a disappointing loss in a shootout to the United States senior team, the Russian team would end up being eliminated from the tournament by Finland senior team with a 3–1 loss; Bobrovsky saw some action after Varlamov was pulled in the game.

Bobrovsky participated in the 2014 World Championship as Russia's starting goaltender. In his first game, he saved all 27 shots in a 5–0 shutout win over Switzerland senior team. Russia against Finland in the final, who eliminated Russia from the Winter Olympics. Bobrovsky faced-off against fellow NHL goaltender Pekka Rinne of the Nashville Predators in the gold medal game. Russia went on to win that game 5–2, with Bobrovsky saving 24 out of 26 shots, backstopping the Russians to their second gold medal in the past three years in the tournament.

Bobrovsky was named the starting goaltender of Russia for the 2015 World Championship. On 9 May 2015, he saved 13 shots including a penalty shot against Belarus senior team in the group stage to help his team to a 7–0 win. On 16 May, in the semifinal, Bobrovsky made several outstanding saves against the United States senior team, and led his team to a 4–0 win. He eventually finished with 35 saves and was named Player of the game for Russia. On 17 May, he allowed six goals on 37 shots in the final, and although he made some great saves early on, it was not enough to keep his team from losing 6–1 to Canada senior team.

== Personal life ==
Bobrovsky and Olga Dorokova were married on 16 August 2011. Bobrovsky's nicknames are "Bob", "Officer Bobrovsky", and "The Number One Cop." Bobrovsky is a passionate Russian Orthodox Christian and has icons of Jesus, Mary, and Sergius of Radonezh in his dressing room stall.

On 13 March 2020, Bobrovsky pledged to give $100,000 to part-time workers of the BB&T Center who were unable to work during the suspension of the 2019–20 season because of the COVID-19 pandemic.

== Career statistics ==
=== Regular season and playoffs ===
| | | | Regular season | | | | | | | | | Playoffs |
| Season | Team | League | GP | W | L | OT | MIN | GA | SO | GAA | SV% | GP | W | L | MIN | GA | SO | GAA | SV% |
|---|---|---|---|---|---|---|---|---|---|---|---|---|---|---|---|---|---|---|---|
| 2006–07 | Metallurg Novokuznetsk | RSL | 8 | — | — | — | 280 | 13 | 0 | 2.78 | — | 1 | — | — | 60 | 4 | 0 | 4.02 | — |
| 2007–08 | Metallurg Novokuznetsk | RSL | 24 | — | — | — | 1,153 | 57 | 1 | 2.97 | .901 | — | — | — | — | — | — | — | — |
| 2008–09 | Metallurg Novokuznetsk | KHL | 32 | 6 | 16 | 2 | 1,636 | 68 | 1 | 2.49 | .927 | — | — | — | — | — | — | — | — |
| 2009–10 | Metallurg Novokuznetsk | KHL | 35 | 9 | 22 | 3 | 1,964 | 89 | 1 | 2.72 | .919 | — | — | — | — | — | — | — | — |
| 2010–11 | Philadelphia Flyers | NHL | 54 | 28 | 13 | 8 | 3,017 | 130 | 0 | 2.59 | .915 | 6 | 0 | 2 | 186 | 10 | 0 | 3.23 | .877 |
| 2011–12 | Philadelphia Flyers | NHL | 29 | 14 | 10 | 2 | 1,550 | 78 | 0 | 3.02 | .899 | 1 | 0 | 0 | 37 | 5 | 0 | 8.11 | .722 |
| 2012–13 | SKA Saint Petersburg | KHL | 24 | 18 | 3 | 2 | 1,420 | 46 | 4 | 1.94 | .932 | — | — | — | — | — | — | — | — |
| 2012–13 | Columbus Blue Jackets | NHL | 38 | 21 | 11 | 6 | 2,219 | 74 | 4 | 2.00 | .932 | — | — | — | — | — | — | — | — |
| 2013–14 | Columbus Blue Jackets | NHL | 58 | 32 | 20 | 5 | 3,299 | 131 | 5 | 2.38 | .923 | 6 | 2 | 4 | 378 | 20 | 0 | 3.17 | .908 |
| 2014–15 | Columbus Blue Jackets | NHL | 51 | 30 | 17 | 3 | 2,994 | 134 | 2 | 2.69 | .918 | — | — | — | — | — | — | — | — |
| 2015–16 | Columbus Blue Jackets | NHL | 37 | 15 | 19 | 1 | 2,116 | 97 | 1 | 2.75 | .908 | — | — | — | — | — | — | — | — |
| 2016–17 | Columbus Blue Jackets | NHL | 63 | 41 | 17 | 5 | 3,708 | 127 | 7 | 2.06 | .931 | 5 | 1 | 4 | 310 | 20 | 0 | 3.88 | .882 |
| 2017–18 | Columbus Blue Jackets | NHL | 65 | 37 | 22 | 6 | 3,912 | 158 | 5 | 2.42 | .921 | 6 | 2 | 4 | 416 | 22 | 0 | 3.18 | .900 |
| 2018–19 | Columbus Blue Jackets | NHL | 62 | 37 | 24 | 1 | 3,557 | 153 | 9 | 2.58 | .913 | 10 | 6 | 4 | 623 | 25 | 0 | 2.41 | .925 |
| 2019–20 | Florida Panthers | NHL | 50 | 23 | 19 | 6 | 2,806 | 151 | 1 | 3.23 | .900 | 4 | 1 | 3 | 234 | 12 | 0 | 3.08 | .901 |
| 2020–21 | Florida Panthers | NHL | 31 | 19 | 8 | 2 | 1,816 | 88 | 0 | 2.91 | .906 | 3 | 1 | 2 | 113 | 10 | 0 | 5.31 | .841 |
| 2021–22 | Florida Panthers | NHL | 54 | 39 | 7 | 3 | 3,083 | 137 | 3 | 2.67 | .913 | 10 | 4 | 6 | 601 | 27 | 0 | 2.70 | .911 |
| 2022–23 | Florida Panthers | NHL | 50 | 24 | 20 | 3 | 2,835 | 145 | 1 | 3.07 | .901 | 19 | 12 | 6 | 1,164 | 54 | 1 | 2.78 | .915 |
| 2023–24 | Florida Panthers | NHL | 58 | 36 | 17 | 4 | 3,414 | 135 | 6 | 2.37 | .915 | 24 | 16 | 8 | 1,420 | 55 | 2 | 2.32 | .906 |
| 2024–25 | Florida Panthers | NHL | 54 | 33 | 19 | 2 | 3,200 | 130 | 5 | 2.44 | .905 | 23 | 16 | 7 | 1,443 | 53 | 3 | 2.20 | .914 |
| 2025–26 | Florida Panthers | NHL | 52 | 27 | 23 | 1 | 3,010 | 154 | 4 | 3.07 | .877 | — | — | — | — | — | — | — | — |
| KHL totals | | | 91 | 33 | 41 | 7 | 5,019 | 203 | 6 | 2.43 | .925 | — | — | — | — | — | — | — | — |
| NHL totals | | | 806 | 456 | 266 | 58 | 46,535 | 2,022 | 53 | 2.61 | .912 | 117 | 61 | 50 | 6,922 | 313 | 6 | 2.71 | .907 |

=== International ===
| Year | Team | Event | Result | GP | W | L | OT | MIN | GA | SO | GAA | SV% |
|---|---|---|---|---|---|---|---|---|---|---|---|---|
| 2008 | Russia | WJC | 3rd place, bronze medalist(s) | 6 | 4 | 2 | 0 | 366 | 15 | 0 | 2.46 | .919 |
| 2014 | Russia | OG | 5th | 3 | 1 | 1 | 0 | 157 | 3 | 1 | 1.15 | .952 |
| 2014 | Russia | WC | 1st place, gold medalist(s) | 8 | 8 | 0 | 0 | 480 | 9 | 2 | 1.13 | .950 |
| 2015 | Russia | WC | 2nd place, silver medalist(s) | 9 | 6 | 3 | 0 | 542 | 21 | 1 | 2.32 | .906 |
| 2016 | Russia | WC | 3rd place, bronze medalist(s) | 9 | 7 | 2 | 0 | 521 | 15 | 1 | 1.73 | .931 |
| 2016 | Russia | WCH | 4th | 4 | 2 | 2 | 0 | 237 | 10 | 1 | 2.53 | .930 |
| 2021 | ROC | WC | 5th | 1 | 0 | 1 | 0 | 62 | 2 | 0 | 1.93 | .917 |
| Junior totals | | | | 6 | 4 | 2 | 0 | 366 | 15 | 0 | 2.46 | .919 |
| Senior totals | | | | 34 | 24 | 9 | 0 | 1,999 | 60 | 6 | 1.79 | .933 |

== Awards and honours ==
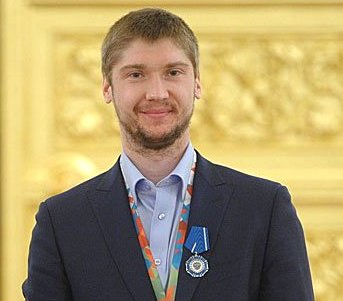
Bobrovsky receiving the Order of Honor at the Kremlin in May 2014

| Award | Year | Ref |
NHL
| First All-Star team | 2013, 2017 | |
| Vezina Trophy | 2013, 2017 | |
| NHL All-Star | 2015, (Note: Did not play due to injury.) 2017, 2024 | |
| Stanley Cup champion | 2024, 2025 | |
International
| WJC Top 3 player on team | 2008 | |
| WC Top 3 player on team | 2014, 2015, 2016 | |
| WC Best Goaltender | 2014 | |

=== Government ===
- "Badge of Merit for the Town of Novokuznetsk" (21 June 2013) – presented by acting mayor of Novokuznetsk Sergey Kuznetsov
- Order of Honor (27 May 2014) – presented by the President of Russia Vladimir Putin for the victory at the 2014 IIHF World Championship as member of Russia men's national ice hockey team
- "Order of Honor of Kuzbass" (3 June 2014) – presented by governor of Kemerovo Oblast Aman Tuleyev for the skills and professionalism in sports activities

== Records ==
=== NHL ===
- Most consecutive wins in one regular season – 14 (29 November 2016 to 3 January 2017 – tied with Tiny Thompson, Tom Barasso, and Jonas Hiller)

=== Philadelphia Flyers ===
- Youngest goaltender to win a season opening game for the Flyers: 22 years and 17 days

=== Columbus Blue Jackets ===
- Most wins in a season: 41 (2016–17)
- Best goals against average in a season: 2.00 (2012–13)
- Best save percentage in a season: .932 (2012–13)

== Notes ==
Awards and achievements
| Preceded by Henrik Lundqvist; Braden Holtby | Winner of the Vezina Trophy; 2013; 2017 | Succeeded by Tuukka Rask; Pekka Rinne |
