= List of NHL goaltenders with 300 wins =

Winning 300 regular season games in the National Hockey League (NHL) is a rare and celebrated milestone for a goaltender. Forty-two goaltenders have reached this mark in NHL history; the first was Turk Broda of the Toronto Maple Leafs, who reached the milestone on December 20, 1950. The most recent was Frederik Andersen of the Carolina Hurricanes, who won his 300th game during the 2024–25 NHL season.

== Prominent goaltenders ==
Martin Brodeur is the all-time leader with 691 career regular season victories. He set the NHL record for wins on March 17, 2009, when he broke Patrick Roy's record of 551 wins. In reaching the 691 wins, Brodeur had eight seasons with at least 40 wins; no other goaltender has had more than three seasons with at least 40 wins. Brodeur credited his durability, noting he was fortunate to avoid suffering any serious injuries during his career, while having the ability to play in excess of 70 games per season for 10 consecutive years. In 2024, Marc-Andre Fleury surpassed Patrick Roy's 551 wins to become the NHL's second-winningest goaltender. Andrei Vasilevskiy was the fastest goaltender to reach the 300-win mark, achieving the milestone in his 490th game.

Only eighteen goaltenders on this list have won at least 300 games on one team: Martin Brodeur (New Jersey Devils), Marc-Andre Fleury (Pittsburgh Penguins), Terry Sawchuk (Detroit Red Wings), Jacques Plante (Montreal Canadiens), Tony Esposito (Chicago Blackhawks), Connor Hellebuyck (Winnipeg Jets), Chris Osgood (Detroit Red Wings), Jonathan Quick (Los Angeles Kings), Miikka Kiprusoff (Calgary Flames), Billy Smith (New York Islanders), and Olaf Kolzig (Washington Capitals); and only seven of those goaltenders on this list (Turk Broda (Toronto Maple Leafs), Mike Richter (New York Rangers), Pekka Rinne (Nashville Predators), Carey Price (Montreal Canadiens), Tuukka Rask (Boston Bruins), Henrik Lundqvist (New York Rangers), and Andrei Vasilevskiy (Tampa Bay Lightning)) have played all their games with one team. Brodeur played his first 1,259 games for the New Jersey Devils and only his final seven games with the St. Louis Blues.

If one combines both their NHL and World Hockey Association (WHA) statistics, Gerry Cheevers (329), Mike Liut (325), and Bernie Parent (304) would have at least 300 wins as well.

Five goaltenders on this list remain active in the 2025–26 NHL season: Sergei Bobrovsky, Connor Hellebuyck, Jonathan Quick, Andrei Vasilevskiy and Frederik Andersen.

Twenty of the goaltenders on this list have been elected to the Hockey Hall of Fame, the most recent being Carey Price of the Montreal Canadiens and Pekka Rinne of the Nashville Predators, who were both inducted in 2026.

The 42 goaltenders who have 300 NHL wins consist of 22 Canadians, seven Americans (Craig Anderson, Tom Barrasso, Connor Hellebuyck, Ryan Miller, Jonathan Quick, Mike Richter, John Vanbiesbrouck), four Finns (Miikka Kiprusoff, Kari Lehtonen, Tuukka Rask, Pekka Rinne), four Russians (Sergei Bobrovsky, Nikolai Khabibulin, Evgeni Nabokov, Andrei Vasilevskiy), two Czechs (Dominik Hasek, Tomas Vokoun), one German (Olaf Kolzig), one Swede (Henrik Lundqvist) and one Dane (Frederik Andersen).

According to Brent Sutter, who coached Brodeur and Kiprusoff, and played with Ed Belfour and Billy Smith, goaltenders who reach 300 wins are all highly competitive athletes: "They were guys that every game, you knew you could count on them."

== Key ==
Column headers
Rank	By career regular season wins
Team	Team with which player achieved 300th regular season win
Date	Date on which player achieved 300th regular season win
GP	Total career regular season games played
W	Total career regular season wins
Win%	Win percentage
HHOF	Year player was inducted into the Hockey Hall of Fame
Ref(s)	Reference(s)
*	Active player in the NHL

== List of goaltenders ==
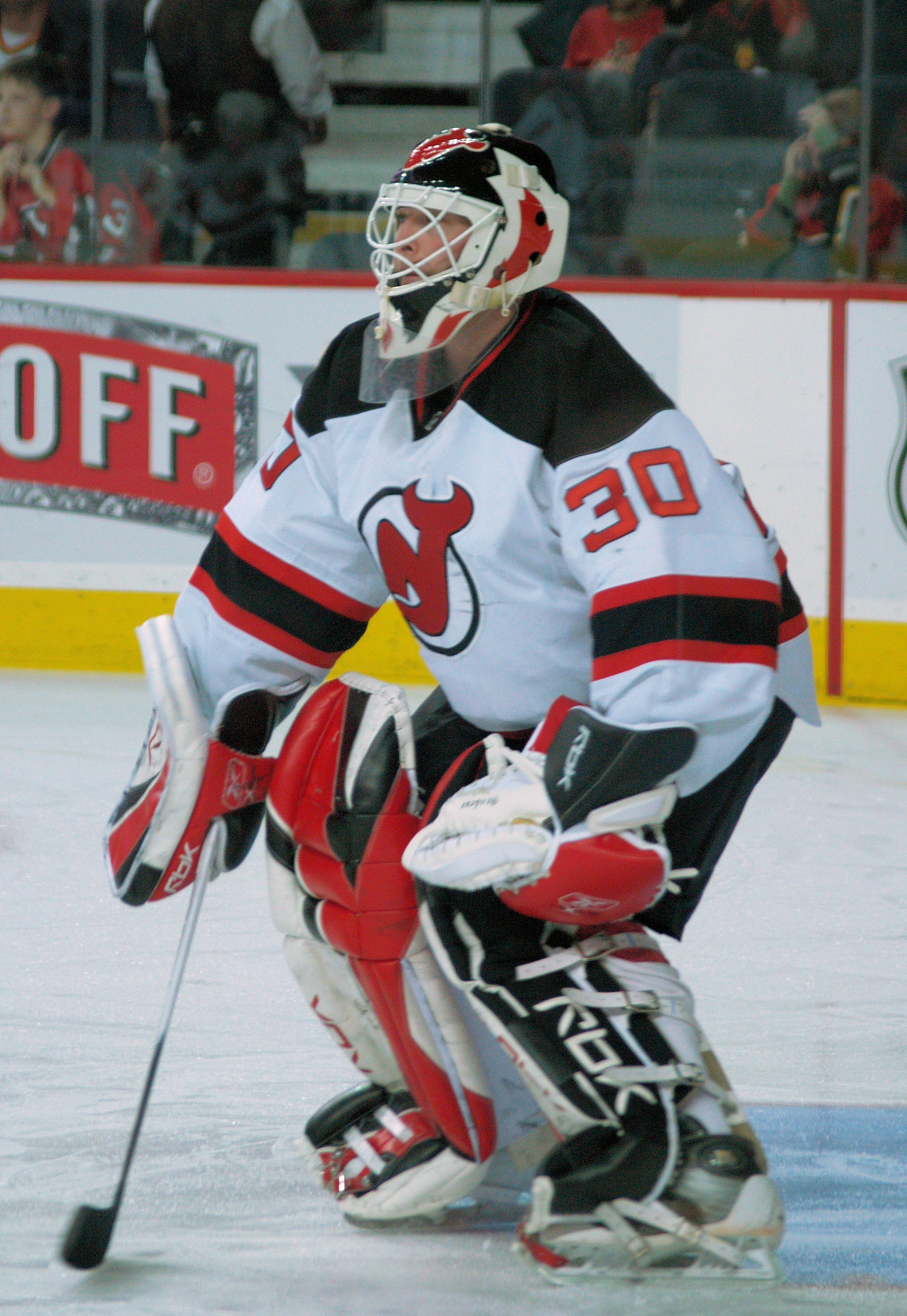
Martin Brodeur is the NHL's all-time wins leader

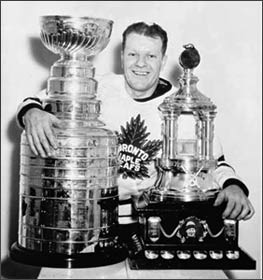
Turk Broda was the first goaltender to win 300 games, doing so in 1950.

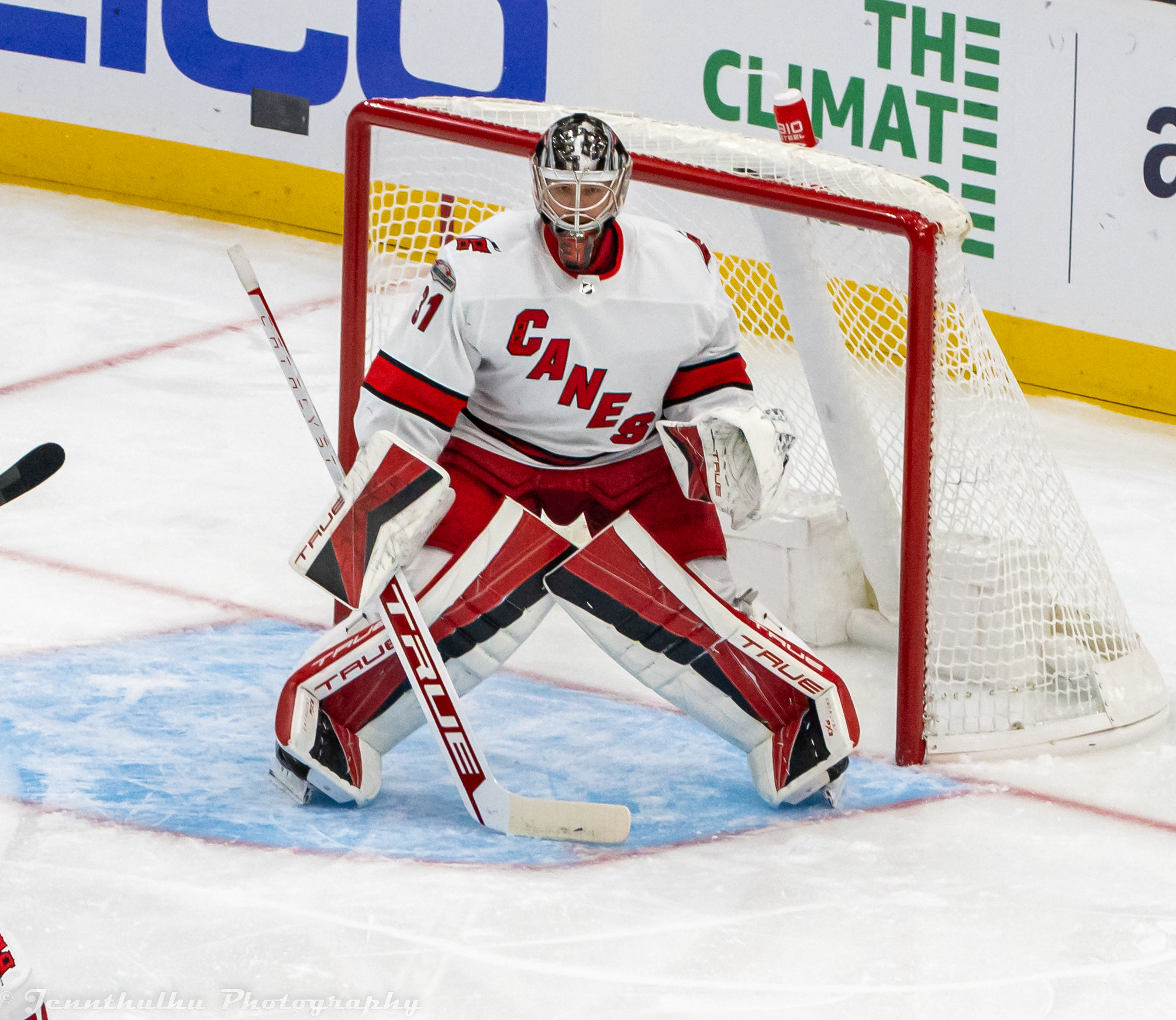
Frederik Andersen is the most recent goaltender to reach 300 wins, doing so in 2025.

Rank	Player	Team	Date	GP	W	Win%	HHOF	Ref(s)
1	Martin Brodeur	New Jersey Devils	December 15, 2001	1,266	691	.566	2018	
2	Marc-Andre Fleury	Pittsburgh Penguins	November 24, 2014	1,051	575	.569	Eligible 2028	
3	Patrick Roy	Colorado Avalanche	February 19, 1996	1,029	551	.553	2006	
4	Roberto Luongo	Vancouver Canucks	March 5, 2011	1,044	489	.487	2022	
5	Ed Belfour	Dallas Stars	February 13, 2000	963	484	.521	2011	
6	Henrik Lundqvist	New York Rangers	March 9, 2014	887	459	.531	2023	
7	Sergei Bobrovsky*	Florida Panthers	October 21, 2021	806	456	.585	Active	
8	Curtis Joseph	Toronto Maple Leafs	December 23, 2000	943	454	.503	—	
9	Terry Sawchuk	Detroit Red Wings	November 16, 1959	971	445	.467	1971	
10	Jacques Plante	Montreal Canadiens	January 6, 1963	837	437	.528	1978	
11	Tony Esposito	Chicago Black Hawks	December 3, 1978	886	423	.480	1988	
12	Jonathan Quick	Los Angeles Kings	January 5, 2019	829	410	.508	Eligible 2029	
13	Glenn Hall	Chicago Black Hawks	October 30, 1965	906	407	.454	1975	
14	Grant Fuhr	St. Louis Blues	November 30, 1995	868	403	.496	2003	
15	Chris Osgood	Detroit Red Wings	March 16, 2004	744	401	.563	—	
16	Ryan Miller	Vancouver Canucks	October 28, 2014	796	391	.509	—	
17	Dominik Hasek	Ottawa Senators	October 15, 2005	735	389	.550	2014	
18	Mike Vernon	Detroit Red Wings	March 26, 1997	781	385	.513	2023	
19	John Vanbiesbrouck	Florida Panthers	December 27, 1997	882	374	.446	—	
20	Andy Moog	Dallas Stars	March 18, 1994	713	372	.556	—	
21	Andrei Vasilevskiy*	Tampa Bay Lightning	November 24, 2024	598	370	.630	Active	
22	Tom Barrasso	Pittsburgh Penguins	October 19, 1997	777	369	.504	2023	
22	Pekka Rinne	Nashville Predators	February 22, 2018	683	369	.562	2026	
24	Carey Price	Montreal Canadiens	December 20, 2018	712	361	.515	2026	
25	Evgeni Nabokov	New York Islanders	January 14, 2012	697	353	.530	—	
25	Rogie Vachon	Detroit Red Wings	November 16, 1979	795	353	.456	2016	
27	Connor Hellebuyck*	Winnipeg Jets	January 7, 2025	625	345	.567	Active	
28	Cam Ward	Carolina Hurricanes	December 12, 2017	701	334	.493	—	
29	Nikolai Khabibulin	Edmonton Oilers	October 6, 2009	799	333	.436	—	
29	Gump Worsley	Minnesota North Stars	March 29, 1970	861	333	.401	1980	
31	Harry Lumley	Boston Bruins	February 8, 1958	803	330	.412	1980	
32	Frederik Andersen*	Carolina Hurricanes	January 23, 2025	552	324	.610	Active	
32	Sean Burke	Philadelphia Flyers	February 14, 2004	820	324	.418	—	
34	Craig Anderson	Buffalo Sabres	March 20, 2022	709	319	.478	–	
34	Miikka Kiprusoff	Calgary Flames	February 8, 2012	623	319	.529	—	
36	Kari Lehtonen	Dallas Stars	December 13, 2017	649	310	.508	—	
37	Tuukka Rask	Boston Bruins	April 15, 2021	564	308	.571	—	
38	Billy Smith	New York Islanders	March 20, 1988	680	305	.474	1993	
39	Turk Broda	Toronto Maple Leafs	December 20, 1950	629	304	.484	1967	
40	Olaf Kolzig	Washington Capitals	March 12, 2008	719	303	.441	—	
41	Mike Richter	New York Rangers	October 28, 2002	666	301	.476	—	
42	Tomas Vokoun	Pittsburgh Penguins	April 22, 2013	700	300	.450	—	

== See also ==
- List of NHL statistical leaders
