= 2011 IIHF World U18 Championships =

2011 IIHF World U18 Championship

Tournament details
- Host country: Germany
- Venues: 2 (in 2 host cities)
- Dates: 14–24 April 2011
- Teams: 10

Final positions
- Champions: United States (6th title)
- Runners-up: Sweden
- Third place: Russia
- Fourth place: Canada

Tournament statistics
- Games played: 31
- Goals scored: 207 (6.68 per game)
- Attendance: 47,309 (1,526 per game)
- Scoring leader: (Russia) Nikita Kucherov (21 points)

The 2011 IIHF World U18 Championships was held in Crimmitschau and Dresden, Germany, from 14 to 24 April 2011.

The United States won the title for the third straight time, after beating Sweden 4–3 in the final in overtime.

== Top Division ==
=== Preliminary round ===
==== Group A ====
Pos	Team	Pld	W	OTW	OTL	L	GF	GA	GD	Pts	Qualification
1	United States	4	4	0	0	0	21	8	+13	12	Semifinals
2	Russia	4	2	1	0	1	24	13	+11	8	Quarterfinals
3	Germany	4	1	0	1	2	11	17	−6	4	Quarterfinals
4	Switzerland	4	1	0	0	3	8	16	−8	3	Relegation Round
5	Slovakia	4	1	0	0	3	9	19	−10	3	Relegation Round

Source: IIHF

All times are local. (CEST/UTC+2)

April 14, 2011; 15:30	Russia	8–2 (3–0, 2–1, 3–1)	Slovakia	Eisstadion Crimmitschau; Attendance: 1,590

Game reference

Andrei Vasilevski
Pavel Shegalo
Goalies
Richard Sabol
Patrik Rybár
Referees:
(Sweden) Morgan Johansson
(Canada) Devin Klein

N. Kucherov (M. Grigorenko, N. Nesterov) (PP) – 03:17	1–0
V. Tkachev (A. Ivanyuzhenkov, M. Shalunov) (PP) – 06:05	2–0
M. Grigorenko – 13:08	3–0
M. Shalunov – 28:50	4–0
A. Slepyshev – 29:35	5–0
	5–1	38:14 – F. Vaško (D. Fujerik, K. Korím) (PP)
N. Yakupov (N. Kucherov, M. Grigorenko) (PP) – 48:07	6–1
N. Kucherov (M. Grigorenko, A. Yarullin) – 48:07	7–1
	7–2	54:08 – K. Korím (F. Vaško) (PP)
M. Grigorenko (N. Kucherov) (SH) – 58:06	8–2

16 min
Penalties
28 min
36
Shots
45

April 14, 2011; 19:30	Switzerland	1–2 (0–1, 1–0, 0–1)	United States	Eisstadion Crimmitschau; Attendance: 356

Game reference

Luca Boltshauser
Goalies
John Gibson
Referees:
(Finland) Teemu Salminen
(Czech Republic) Robin Sir

	0–1	03:18 – R. Haggerty (D. Carlson, Z. Larraza)
D. Simion (Y. Celio, L. Balmelli) – 21:11	1–1
	1–2	45:09 – R. Boucher (J. Miller, R. Russo)

16 min
Penalties
14 min
30
Shots
46

April 15, 2011; 15:30	Slovakia	1–8 (0–2, 0–4, 1–2)	United States	Eisstadion Crimmitschau; Attendance: 800

Game reference

Richard Sabol
Patrik Rybar
Goalies
John Gibson
Matt McNeely
Referees:
(Denmark) Jacob Grumsen
(Norway) Per Gustav Solem

	0–1	11:22 – R. Grimaldi (J. Miller, S. Jones) (PP)
	0–2	19:31 – C. Murphy (T. Boyd, H. Samuelsson) (PP2)
	0–3	21:00 – R. Russo (S. Jones, R. Grimaldi) (PP)
	0–4	30:42 – T. Boyd (Z. Larraza) (SH)
	0–5	35:57 – R. Boucher (J. Miller, R. Grimaldi) (PP)
	0–6	39:01 – A. Reid (T. Biggs, R. Russo) (PP)
	0–7	44:38 – D. Carlson (Z. Larraza, R. Russo)
	0–8	47:08 – R. Haggerty (M. Paliotta, J. McCabe) (PP2)
M. Daňo (F. Vaško) – 50:32	1–8

24 min
Penalties
28 min
25
Shots
46

April 15, 2011; 19:30	Switzerland	1–4 (0–2, 1–1, 0–1)	Germany	Eisstadion Crimmitschau; Attendance: 3,053

Game reference

Luca Boltshauser
Goalies
Marvin Cupper
Referees:
(Sweden) Morgan Johansson
(Canada) Devin Klein

	0–1	12:15 – T. Rieder (K. Keller, L. Pfoderl) (PP)
	0–2	15:10 – T. Rieder
	0–3	27:39 – K. Keller (D. Reimer, H. Sekesi)
D. Simion (D. Kukan, C. Hachler) (PP) – 36:40	1–3
	1–4	58:31 – D. Fischbuch (H. Haase) (ENG)

8 min
Penalties
10 min
45
Shots
46

April 16, 2011; 19:30	Germany	4 – 5 GWS (0–3, 3–0, 1–1) (OT: 0–0) (SO: 0–1)	Russia	Eisstadion Crimmitschau; Attendance: 4,060

Game reference

Marvin Cupper
Goalies
Pavel Shegalo
Referees:
(Finland) Teemu Salminen
(Norway) Per Gustav Solem

	0–1	06:25 – R. Konkov (N. Nesterov, N. Kucherov)
	0–2	09:46 – R. Konkov (N. Kucherov, A. Yarullin) (PP)
	0–3	12:01 – M. Shalunov (PS)
N. Latta (D. Fischbuch, O. Mebus) (PP) – 29:34	1–3
A. Ackermann (K. Keller, L. Grozinger) (PP) – 36:34	2–3
D. Daxlberger (L. Pfoderl, S. Bar) (PP2) – 37:56	3–3
	3–4	49:29 – A. Saveliev (M. Grigorenko, N. Kucherov) (PP)
L. Grozinger (H. Sekesi, S. Kronthaler) – 50:00	4–4
	4–5	65:00 – N. Kucherov (GWG)

14 min
Penalties
59 min
41
Shots
51

April 17, 2011; 15:30	Slovakia	2–3 (1–2, 0–0, 1–1)	Switzerland	Eisstadion Crimmitschau; Attendance: 624

Game reference

Patrik Rybár
Goalies
Luca Boltshauser
Referees:
(Sweden) Morgan Johansson
(Belarus) Maxim Sidorenko

	0–1	01:48 – T. Richard (L. Martschini, A. Bertaggia)
D. Hudec (T. Nechala, P. Čerešňák) (PP) – 03:22	1–1
	1–2	09:07 – S. Andrighetto (D. Grassi)
P. Boltun (M. Gernat, E. Bagin) – 41:59	2–2
	2–3	50:47 – C. Bertschy (SH)

12 min
Penalties
22 min
28
Shots
32

April 17, 2011; 19:30	United States	4–3 (2–0, 1–1, 1–2)	Russia	Eisstadion Crimmitschau; Attendance: 2,216

Game reference

John Gibson
Goalies
Andrei Vasilevski
Referees:
(Canada) Devin Klein
(Czech Republic) Robin Sir

T. Boyd (N. Kerdiles) – 07:07	1–0
J. Miller (R. Russo) – 11:02 (PP)	2–0
	2–1	25:04 – N. Kucherov (N. Yakupov, A. Yarullin)
J. Miller (R. Boucher) – 26:22	3–1
	3–2	43:35 – N. Yakupov (A. Yarullin, M. Grigorenko) (PP)
	3–3	55:16 – N. Kucherov (A. Yarullin, N. Yakupov)
R. Boucher (R. Grimaldi) – 59:39	4–3

10 min
Penalties
6 min
40
Shots
39

April 18, 2011; 19:30	Germany	0–4 (0–2, 0–2, 0–0)	Slovakia	Eisstadion Crimmitschau; Attendance: 2,037

Game reference

Marvin Cupper
Goalies
Patrik Rybár
Referees:
(Finland) Teemu Salminen
(Norway) Per Gustav Solem

0–1	03:02 – B. Mráz (P. Boltun, F. Vaško)
0–2	06:29 – T. Mikúš (M. Hindos, V. Dolník) (PP)
0–3	28:31 – V. Dolník (M. Hindos)
0–4	33:52 – V. Dolník (M. Hindos, M. Daňo)

18 min
Penalties
8 min
30
Shots
33

April 19, 2011; 15:30	Russia	8–3 (4–0, 3–2, 1–1)	Switzerland	Eisstadion Crimmitschau; Attendance: 1,010

Game reference

Andrei Vasilevski
Pavel Shegalo
Goalies
Luca Boltshauser
Robin Kuonen
Referees:
(Belarus) Maxim Sidorenko
(Czech Republic) Robin Sir

N. Yakupov (M. Grigorenko, N. Kucherov) – 04:01	1–0
M. Grigorenko (N. Yakupov, A. Yarullin) (SH) – 09:10	2–0
N. Nesterov (N. Yakupov, A. Yarullin) – 16:54	3–0
N. Kucherov (N. Yakupov, M. Grigorenko) (PP) – 19:52	4–0
N. Kucherov (M. Grigorenko, N. Yakupov) (PP) – 30:34	5–0
	5–1	30:58 – D. Simion (L. Hoffmann, D. Kukan)
B. Yakimov (A. Slepyshev, D. Mikhailov) – 33:37	6–1
	6–2	33:53 – J. Neuenschwander (S. Andrighetto)
M. Grigorenko (N. Kucherov) – 39:25	7–2
N. Kucherov (M. Grigorenko) – 51:24 (SH)	8–2
	8–3	53:38 – S. Andrighetto

18 min
Penalties
14 min
23
Shots
49

April 19, 2011; 19:30	United States	7–3 (2–0, 4–2, 1–1)	Germany	Eisstadion Crimmitschau; Attendance: 3,743

Game reference

John Gibson
Goalies
Philip Lehr
Referees:
(Sweden) Morgan Johansson
(Canada) Devin Klein

J. Miller (R. Boucher, R. Grimaldi) – 01:02	1–0
R. Boucher (J. Miller, R. Grimaldi) – 12:40	2–0
	2–1	28:26 – S. Uvira (A. Ackermann, L. Grozinger) (PP)
R. Grimaldi (J. Miller, R. Russo) – 29:16	3–1
	3–2	30:00 – D. Fischbuch (M. Meirandres)
R. Boucher (R. Russo, S. Jones) (PP) – 30:26	4–2
A. Reid (B. Kaib) – 35:43	5–2
T. Biggs (T. Boyd, N. Kerdiles) – 39:19	6–2
	6–3	46:28 – L. Pfoderl (O. Mebus, A. Ackermann) (PP2)
B. Pietila (Z. Larraza, B. Kaib) – 55:05	7–3

33 min
Penalties
16 min
43
Shots
27

==== Group B ====
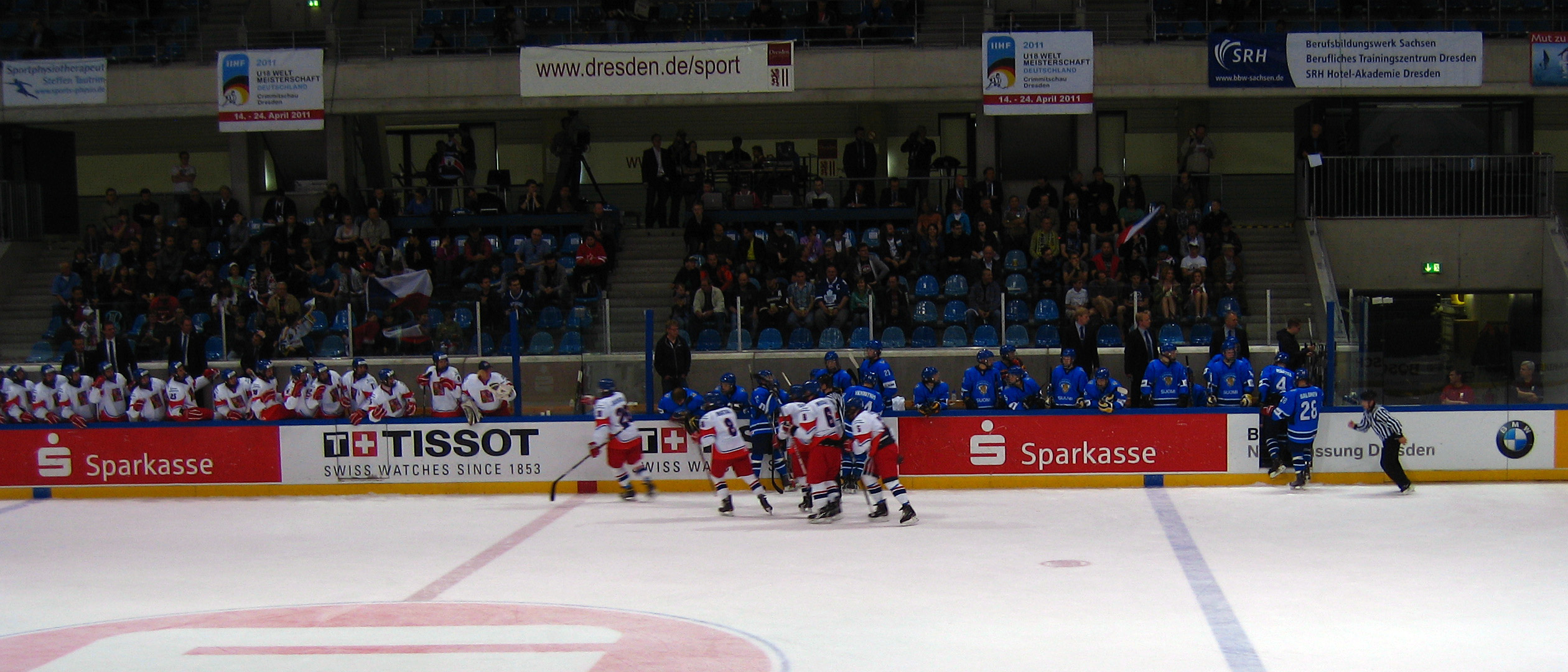
Finland - Czech Republic

Pos	Team	Pld	W	OTW	OTL	L	GF	GA	GD	Pts	Qualification
1	Sweden	4	3	0	0	1	20	8	+12	9	Semifinals
2	Canada	4	3	0	0	1	17	8	+9	9	Quarterfinals
3	Finland	4	2	0	0	2	16	15	+1	6	Quarterfinals
4	Czech Republic	4	2	0	0	2	8	13	−5	6	Relegation Round
5	Norway	4	0	0	0	4	6	23	−17	0	Relegation Round

Source: IIHF

All times are local. (CEST/UTC+2)

April 14, 2011; 15:30	Finland	5–2 (2–0, 1–2, 2–0)	Norway	EnergieVerbund Arena; Attendance: 276

Game reference

Samu Perhonen
Goalies
Steffen Søberg
Espen Johansen
Referees:
(Slovakia) Jozef Kubus
(Switzerland) Daniel Stricker

M. Aaltonen (J. Tommila) – 06:32	1–0
T. Wilenius (M. Salomäki) – 07:57	2–0
	2–1	21:12 – E. Medby (PP)
	2–2	32:28 – A. Heier (E. Medby, E. Salo)
M. Salomäki (V. Järveläinen, J. Armia) (PP) – 38:06	3–2
K. Torniainen (V. Järveläinen) – 41:50	4–2
M. Salomäki (J. Armia, M. Granlund) (PP) – 59:59	5–2

12 min
Penalties
22 min
56
Shots
13

April 14, 2011; 19:30	Czech Republic	2–1 (0–1, 0–0, 2–0)	Sweden	EnergieVerbund Arena; Attendance: 1,548

Game reference

Matěj Machovský
Goalies
Niklas Lundström
Referees:
(Belarus) Maxim Sidorenko
(United States) Shane Warschaw

	0–1	10:49 – F. Forsberg (G. Björklund)
T. Kvapil (M. Hrbas, M. Frk) (PP) – 43:28	1–1
D. Jaškin (M. Frk, M. Hrbas) (PP) – 51:33	2–1

24 min
Penalties
22 min
26
Shots
45

April 15, 2011; 15:30	Norway	2–10 (1–1, 0–3, 1–6)	Sweden	EnergieVerbund Arena; Attendance: 553

Game reference

Steffen Søberg
Espen Johansen
Goalies
Niklas Lundström
Referees:
(Germany) Lars Brüggemann
(Russia) Alexei Vasilyev

J. Knutsen (M. Trittenes) (PP) – 18:53	1–0
	1–1	19:01 – F. Forsberg (W. Karlsson)
	1–2	23:23 – M. Zibanejad (O. Klefbom)
	1–3	34:39 – M. Zibanejad (J. Boyce-Rotevall, V. Rask)
	1–4	37:12 – J. Boyce-Rotevall (M. Zibanejad, R. Bengtsson)
	1–5	40:15 – V. Rask (M. Vikstrand) (SH)
	1–6	44:53 – G. Björklund (A. Blomkvist) (SH)
J. Knutsen (E. Salo) (PP) – 37:13	2–6
	2–7	47:13 – F. Forsberg (R. Bengtsson, K. Johansson) (PP)
	2–8	49:02 – M. Zibanejad (J. Boyce-Rotevall, O. Klefbom)
	2–9	53:25 – V. Rask (M. Zibanejad) (PP)
	2–10	56:41 – J. Boyce-Rotevall (V. Rask)

14 min
Penalties
10 min
14
Shots
77

April 15, 2011; 19:30	Czech Republic	0–5 (0–3, 0–0, 0–2)	Canada	EnergieVerbund Arena; Attendance: 2,027

Game reference

Matěj Machovský
Goalies
Malcolm Subban
Referees:
(Belarus) Maxim Sidorenko
(Switzerland) Daniel Stricker

0–1	01:10 – E. Locke (R. Murphy, A. Quine)
0–2	03:44 – M. Rielly (A. Quine, M. McNeill)
0–3	14:28 – M. Scheifele (R. Murray, R. Murphy) (PP)
0–4	50:52 – M. Scheifele (D. Catenacci, R. Murray)
0–5	54:33 – R. Murphy (R. Murray, N. Cousins) (PP)

12 min
Penalties
12 min
26
Shots
29

April 16, 2011; 19:30	Canada	5–4 (1–0, 1–2, 3–2)	Finland	EnergieVerbund Arena; Attendance: 1,625

Game reference

Malcolm Subban
Goalies
Samu Perhonen
Referees:
(Denmark) Jacob Grumsen
(Russia) Alexei Vasilyev

E. Locke (R. Murphy, M. McNeill) (PP) – 03:24	1–0
	1–1	23:37 – M. Aaltonen (J. Armia, T. Kallela) (PP)
	1–2	31:56 – O. Määttä (T. Kallela, J. Armia)
R. Murphy (C. Smith) – 37:46	2–2
	2–3	41:06 – J. Armia (PP)
M. Scheifele (C. Ceci) – 50:05	3–3
N. Cousins (R. Murray, T. Ewanyk) – 50:45	4–3
C. Smith (A. Brassard) – 54:44	5–3
	5–4	58:05 – M. Granlund (O. Määttä) (PP)

32 min
Penalties
16 min
35
Shots
38

April 17, 2011; 15:30	Norway	2–3 (1–0, 1–2, 0–1)	Czech Republic	EnergieVerbund Arena; Attendance: 878

Game reference

Steffen Søberg
Goalies
Matěj Machovský
Referees:
(Slovakia) Jozef Kubus
(Switzerland) Daniel Stricker

A. Heier (E. Medby) – 02:19	1–0
	1–1	20:18 – M. Frk (T. Hyka)
J. Karterud (M. Noteng) – 33:28	2–1
	2–2	38:13 – T. Rousek (M. Švihálek)
	2–3	58:12 – D. Jaškin (M. Hrbas) (PP)

14 min
Penalties
12 min
18
Shots
51

April 17, 2011; 19:30	Sweden	5–2 (1–1, 3–0, 1–1)	Finland	EnergieVerbund Arena; Attendance: 1,114

Game reference

Niklas Lundström
Goalies
Richard Ullberg
Referees:
(Germany) Lars Brüggemann
(United States) Shane Warschaw

J. Boyce-Rotevall (V. Rask, J. Brodin) (PP) – 06:26	1–0
	1–1	12:34 – T. Kallela (M. Granlund, A. Salonen) (PP)
E. Lundberg (V. Arvidsson) (PP) – 24:39	2–1
W. Karlsson (T. Nilsson, G. Björklund) – 31:53	3–1
M. Zibanejad (R. Bengtsson) – 32:12	4–1
W. Karlsson (F. Forsberg, R. Bengtsson) (PP) – 48:50	5–1
	5–2	52:58 – V. Järveläinen (J. Armia) (PP)

16 min
Penalties
16 min
40
Shots
14

April 18, 2011; 19:30	Canada	5–0 (3–0, 1–0, 1–0)	Norway	EnergieVerbund Arena; Attendance: 638

Game reference

Andrew D'Agostini
Goalies
Steffen Søberg
Referees:
(Germany) Lars Brüggemann
(Denmark) Jacob Grumsen

N. Cousins (B. Ritchie, M. Scheifele) – 00:58	1–0
M. Scheifele (M. McNeill) (PP) – 07:39	2–0
C. Smith (B. Andrews, D. Catenacci) – 12:23	3–0
M. Scheifele (R. Murphy, R. Murray) (PP) – 30:06	4–0
S. Koekkoek (C. Hudon, M. McNeill) (PP) – 51:01	5–0

16 min
Penalties
14 min
63
Shots
19

April 19, 2011; 15:30	Finland	5–3 (0–1, 1–1, 4–1)	Czech Republic	EnergieVerbund Arena; Attendance: 1,048

Game reference

Samu Perhonen
Goalies
Matěj Machovský
Referees:
(Switzerland) Daniel Stricker
(Russia) Alexei Vasilyev

	0–1	18:56 – D. Jaškin (M. Frk)
M. Aaltonen (J. Armia) – 32:18	1–1
	1–2	39:05 – T. Rousek (M. Švihálek)
V. Järveläinen (M. Granlund) (PP2) – 40:46	2–2
	2–3	51:21 – L. Sedlák (M. Frk)
J. Armia (A. Salonen) – 54:43	3–3
T. Kallela (O. Määttä) – 55:16	4–3
M. Hannikainen (M. Granlund) – 59:29	5–3

18 min
Penalties
12 min
27
Shots
30

April 19, 2011; 19:30	Sweden	4–2 (0–1, 0–0, 4–1)	Canada	EnergieVerbund Arena; Attendance: 2,098

Game reference

Niklas Lundström
Goalies
Malcolm Subban
Referees:
(Slovakia) Jozef Kubus
(United States) Shane Warschaw

	0–1	12:59 – N. Cousins
	0–2	41:47 – R. Murphy
L. Fröberg (O. Klefbom) – 42:04	1–2
G. Björklund (F. Forsberg) – 54:14	2–2
O. Klefbom – 54:52	3–2
J. Nermark (PP, ENG) – 59:34	4–2

20 min
Penalties
24 min
36
Shots
22

=== Relegation round ===
The results from matches between teams from the same group in the preliminary round were carried forward to this round.

Pos	Team	Pld	W	OTW	OTL	L	GF	GA	GD	Pts	Relegation
1	Switzerland	3	3	0	0	0	11	5	+6	9	
2	Czech Republic	3	2	0	0	1	9	9	0	6	
3	Norway	3	1	0	0	2	9	9	0	3	Relegated to the 2012 Division I
4	Slovakia	3	0	0	0	3	7	13	−6	0	Relegated to the 2012 Division I

Source: IIHF

All times are local. (CEST/UTC+2)

April 21, 2011; 15:30	Switzerland	4–1 (0–0, 2–1, 2–0)	Norway	EnergieVerbund Arena; Attendance: 328

Game reference

Luca Boltshauser
Goalies
Steffen Søberg
Referees:
(Slovakia) Jozef Kubus
(Russia) Alexei Vasilyev

	0–1	24:53 – M. Hoff (J. Knutsen, M. Søberg) (PP)
S. Guerra (L. Martschini) (PP) – 38:19	1–1
L. Martschini (T. Richard, S. Andrighetto) – 39:51	2–1
T. Richard (PP2) – 49:36	3–1
T. Richard (SH, ENG) – 58:40	4–1

20 min
Penalties
30 min
51
Shots
29

April 21, 2011; 19:30	Czech Republic	4–3 (1–2, 1–1, 2–0)	Slovakia	EnergieVerbund Arena; Attendance: 728

Game reference

Matěj Machovský
Goalies
Patrik Rybár
Referees:
(Belarus) Maxim Sidorenko
(United States) Shane Warschaw

T. Hertl (D. Jaškin, O. Hampl) – 01:29	1–0
	1–1	06:36 – B. Mráz (M. Daňo, M. Hindos)
	1–2	18:22 – B. Rapáč (K. Korím, P. Bezuška) (PP)
L. Sedlák (PS) – 23:39	2–2
	2–3	25:41 – M. Daňo (K. Korím) (PP2)
J. Matai (M. Hrbas) – 50:15	3–3
L. Sedlák (ENG) – 59:58	4–3

26 min
Penalties
4 min
20
Shots
36

April 23, 2011; 15:30	Slovakia	2–6 (2–1, 0–3, 0–2)	Norway	EnergieVerbund Arena; Attendance: 255

Game reference

Patrik Rybár
Goalies
Steffen Søberg
Referees:
(Denmark) Jacob Grumsen
(Czech Republic) Robin Sir

A. Bires (B. Rapáč) – 07:28	1–0
B. Mráz (SH) – 13:06	2–0
	2–1	19:02 – M. Hoff (S. Weberg)
	2–2	21:15 – J. Knutsen (S. Weberg, M. Hoff) (PP2)
	2–3	22:41 – M. Lund (M. Pedersen)
	2–4	37:38 – M. Hoff (M. Trettenes, M. Søberg) (PP)
	2–5	37:38 – M. Søberg (M. Hoff) (PP)
	2–6	58:20 – E. Salo (I. Haaland, E. Medby) (PP)

57 min
Penalties
24 min
51
Shots
25

April 23, 2011; 19:30	Switzerland	4–2 (2–1, 1–0, 1–1)	Czech Republic	EnergieVerbund Arena; Attendance: 535

Game reference

Luca Boltshauser
Goalies
Jaroslav Pavelka
Referees:
(Germany) Lars Brüggemann
(Norway) Per Gustav Solem

	0–1	10:49 – D. Jaškin
S. Andrighetto (L. Martschini) – 16:00	1–1
A. Bertaggia (C. Marti) – 17:12	2–1
T. Richard (L. Martschini) – 34:11	3–1
	3–2	42:22 – T. Hyka (O. Hampl, L. Sedlák)
L. Martschini (S. Hebeisen) – 44:03	4–2

22 min
Penalties
10 min
25
Shots
33

=== Final round ===
Quarterfinals
A2	Russia	5
B3	Finland	2
B2	Canada	4
A3	Germany	3

Semifinals
B1	Sweden	3
A2	Russia	1
A1	United States	5
B2	Canada	4

Final
B1	Sweden	3
A1	United States	4
Third place
A2	Russia	6
B2	Canada	4

==== Quarterfinals ====
April 21, 2011; 15:30	Russia	5–2 (1–0, 1–1, 3–1)	Finland	Eisstadion Crimmitschau; Attendance: 694

Game reference

Andrei Vasilevski
Pavel Shegalo
Goalies
Samu Perhonen
Referees:
(Germany) Lars Brüggemann
(Sweden) Morgan Johansson

A. Ivanyuzhenkov (A. Pedan A. Kuvayev) – 19:55	1–0
	1–1	33:11 – M. Aaltonen (O. Määttä) (PP)
A. Slepyshev (A. Pedan D. Mikhailov) (PP) – 35:08	2–1
	2–2	44:27 – M. Salomäki (J. Armia, M. Granlund) (PP)
N. Kucherov (M. Grigorenko, A. Yarullin) (PP) – 49:50	3–2
A. Slepyshev (D. Mikhailov) – 55:36	4–2
N. Nesterov (N. Kucherov, M. Grigorenko) (ENG) – 58:47	5–2

14 min
Penalties
12 min
35
Shots
30

April 21, 2011; 19:30	Canada	4–3 (1–2, 1–0, 2–1)	Germany	Eisstadion Crimmitschau; Attendance: 3,150

Game reference

Malcolm Subban
Goalies
Marvin Cupper
Referees:
(Finland) Teemu Salminen
(Czech Republic) Robin Sir

R. Murray (M. McNeill) (PP) – 01:15	1–0
	1–1	06:57 – L. Pfoderl (M. Meirandres) (PP)
	1–2	12:52 – T. Rieder (L. Pfoderl)
B. Ritchie (R. Murray) – 39:49	2–2
	2–3	41:57 – A. Ackermann (S. Uvira)
M. Rielly (S. Koekkoek, M. McNeill) (PP) – 50:47	3–3
N. Cousins (M. Rielly) (PP) – 55:18	4–3

12 min
Penalties
10 min
47
Shots
31

==== 5th place game ====
April 23, 2011; 10:30	Finland	6–0 (1–0, 2–0, 3–0)	Germany	Eisstadion Crimmitschau; Attendance: 915

Game reference

Richard Ullberg
Goalies
Philip Lehr
Referees:
(Slovakia) Jozef Kubus
(Russia) Alexei Vasilyev

H. Liedes (T. Kallela, J. Valkonen) (SH) – 14:31	1–0
J. Valkonen (M. Granlund) – 23:30	2–0
M. Salomäki (J. Armia) – 29:31	3–0
M. Granlund (M. Salomäki) (SH) – 43:21	4–0
J. Armia (M. Granlund, A. Salonen) – 51:59	5–0
J. Armia (M. Granlund) – 58:28	6–0

8 min
Penalties
12 min
29
Shots
26

==== Semifinals ====
April 23, 2011; 14:30	Sweden	3–1 (0–1, 1–0, 2–0)	Russia	Eisstadion Crimmitschau; Attendance: 1,003

Game reference

Niklas Lundström
Goalies
Andrei Vasilevski
Referees:
(Canada) Devin Klein
(United States) Shane Warschaw

	0–1	03:07 – S. Smurov (N. Kucherov R. Konkov)
J. Boyce-Rotevall (M. Zibanejad) – 31:02	1–1
G. Björklund (W. Karlsson) – 45:23	2–1
G. Björklund (ENG) – 59:35	3–1

4 min
Penalties
60 min
47
Shots
29

April 23, 2011; 18:30	United States	5 – 4 OT (1–1, 1–0, 2–3) (OT: 1–0)	Canada	Eisstadion Crimmitschau; Attendance: 1,376

Game reference

John Gibson
Goalies
Malcolm Subban
Referees:
(Finland) Teemu Salminen
(Switzerland) Daniel Stricker

	0–1	04:37 – B. Ritchie (R. Murphy, A. Quine) (PP2)
J. Miller – 11:14	1–1
R. Boucher (J. Miller) – 36:10	2–1
Z. Larraza (T. Boyd) – 46:43	3–1
R. Boucher (J. Miller) (SH) – 47:17	4–1
	4–2	49:15 – B. Ritchie (N. Cousins, A. Quine) (PP)
	4–3	58:25 – R. Murphy (R. Murray) (PP)
	4–4	59:09 – M. Scheifele (R. Murray)
T. Biggs – 64:22	5–4

12 min
Penalties
16 min
42
Shots
42

==== Bronze medal game ====
April 24, 2011; 14:30	Russia	6–4 (1–1, 4–2, 1–1)	Canada	Eisstadion Crimmitschau; Attendance: 2,024

Game reference

Andrei Vasilevskiy
Goalies
Andrew D'Agostini
Referees:
(Sweden) Morgan Johansson
(Switzerland) Daniel Stricker

N. Kucherov (M. Grigorenko, A. Yarullin) – 11:36	1–0
	1–1	18:47 – R. Murphy (B. Ritchie, A. Quine) (PP)
	1–2	23:07 – A. Quine (M. Scheifele, R. Murphy) (PP2)
N. Yakupov (R. Konkov, A. Yarullin) – 27:40	2–2
V. Tkachev (N. Yakupov) – 28:24	3–2
N. Yakupov (V. Tkachev) (SH) – 30:25	4–2
N. Kucherov (M. Grigorenko, A. Yarullin) (PP) – 35:42	5–2
	5–3	37:59 – R. Murray (R. Murphy, E. Locke) (PP)
	5–4	58:20 – B. Ritchie (R. Murphy, N. Cousins)
N. Yakupov (N. Kucherov, M. Grigorenko) (ENG) – 59:56	6–4

10 min
Penalties
6 min
33
Shots
42

==== Final ====
April 24, 2011; 18:30	Sweden	3 – 4 OT (1–1, 2–0, 0–2) (OT: 0–1)	United States	Eisstadion Crimmitschau; Attendance: 5,007

Game reference

Niklas Lundström
Goalies
John Gibson
Referees:
(Canada) Devin Klein
(Finland) Teemu Salminen

F. Forsberg – 03:24	1–0
	1–1	19:52 – J. Trouba (C. Murphy, T. Boyd) (PP)
A. Blomkvist (G. Björklund) – 32:21	2–1
G. Björklund (W. Karlsson, K. Johansson) – 37:50	3–1
	3–2	41:20 – C. Murphy (R. Grimaldi, J. Miller)
	3–3	58:31 – R. Boucher (J. Miller)
	3–4	66:06 – C. Murphy (R. Russo)

31 min
Penalties
41 min
10
Shots
6

=== Scoring leaders ===
List shows the top ten skaters sorted by points, then goals.

Player	GP	G	A	Pts	+/−	PIM
(Russia) Nikita Kucherov	7	11	10	21	+10	6
(Russia) Mikhail Grigorenko	7	4	14	18	+10	18
(Russia) Nail Yakupov	7	6	7	13	+6	6
(Finland) Joel Armia	6	4	9	13	+2	8
(United States) J. T. Miller	6	4	9	13	+8	6
(Canada) Ryan Murphy	7	4	9	13	+2	2
(Russia) Albert Yarullin	7	0	11	11	+12	4
(United States) Reid Boucher	6	8	2	10	+9	8
(Canada) Ryan Murray	7	3	7	10	+1	6
(Finland) Markus Granlund	6	2	8	10	+4	6

GP = Games played; G = Goals; A = Assists; Pts = Points; +/− = Plus/minus; PIM = Penalties In Minutes
Source: IIHF.com

=== Leading goaltenders ===
Only the top five goaltenders, based on save percentage, who have played 40% of their team's minutes are included in this list.

Player	TOI	SA	GA	GAA	Sv%	SO
(Russia) Andrei Vasilevski	343:30	235	15	2.62	93.62	0
(Norway) Steffen Søberg	338:46	317	22	3.90	93.06	0
(United States) John Gibson	358:52	189	14	2.34	92.59	0
(Germany) Marvin Cupper	245:00	176	14	3.43	92.05	0
(Switzerland) Luca Boltshauser	332:44	198	16	2.89	91.92	0

TOI = Time on ice (minutes:seconds); SA = Shots against; GA = Goals against; GAA = Goals against average; Sv% = Save percentage; SO = Shutouts
Source: IIHF.com

=== Tournament Awards ===
Best players selected by the directorate

- Best Goalkeeper: John Gibson (USA)
- Best Forward: Nikita Kucherov (RUS)
- Best Defenseman: Ryan Murphy (CAN)

Best players of each team

Best players of each team selected by the coaches.

Team	Players
Canada	Ryan Murray; Mark Scheifele; Ryan Murphy
Czech Republic	Matěj Machovský; David Musil; Lukáš Sedlák
Finland	Joel Armia; Miikka Salomäki; Olli Määttä
Germany	Marvin Cupper; Daniel Fischbuch; Tobias Rieder
Norway	Steffen Søberg; Magnus Hoff; Sebastian Weberg
Russia	Albert Yarullin; Anton Slepyshev; Bogdan Yakimov
Switzerland	Luca Boltshauser; Jan Neuenschwander; Tanner Richard
Slovakia	Vladimír Dolník; Peter Boltun; Karol Korím
Sweden	Oscar Klefbom; Victor Rask; Joachim Nermark
United States	J. T. Miller; Robbie Russo; John Gibson

=== Final standings ===
Rank	Team
1st place, gold medalist(s)	United States
2nd place, silver medalist(s)	Sweden
3rd place, bronze medalist(s)	Russia
4	Canada
5	Finland
6	Germany
7	Switzerland
8	Germany
9	Norway
10	Slovakia

== Division I ==
=== Group A ===
The tournament was played in Riga, Latvia, from 11 to 17 April 2011.

Pos	Team	Pld	W	OTW	OTL	L	GF	GA	GD	Pts	Promotion or relegation
1	Latvia	4	4	0	0	0	21	2	+19	12	Promoted to the 2012 Top Division
2	Italy	4	3	0	0	1	16	9	+7	9	
3	Kazakhstan	4	1	1	0	2	12	19	−7	5	
4	Hungary	4	1	0	1	2	10	16	−6	4	
5	Great Britain	4	0	0	0	4	12	25	−13	0	Relegated to the 2012 Division II
–	Japan (Note: Japan withdrew before the tournament due to the 2011 Tōhoku earthquake and tsunami.)	0	0	0	0	0	0	0	0	0	Withdrawn

Source: IIHF

=== Group B ===
The tournament was played in Maribor, Slovenia, from 10 to 16 April 2011.

Pos	Team	Pld	W	OTW	OTL	L	GF	GA	GD	Pts	Promotion or relegation
1	Denmark	5	4	0	0	1	31	10	+21	12	Promoted to the 2012 Top Division
2	Slovenia	5	4	0	0	1	18	14	+4	12	
3	France	5	2	1	0	2	19	11	+8	8	
4	Belarus	5	2	0	1	2	25	13	+12	7	
5	Poland	5	2	0	0	3	12	20	−8	6	
6	South Korea	5	0	0	0	5	11	48	−37	0	Relegated to the 2012 Division II

Source: IIHF

== Division II ==
=== Group A ===
The tournament was played in Braşov, Romania, from 19 to 25 March 2011.

Pos	Team	Pld	W	OTW	OTL	L	GF	GA	GD	Pts	Promotion or relegation
1	Austria	5	5	0	0	0	56	3	+53	15	Promoted to the 2012 Division I
2	Romania	5	3	1	0	1	26	12	+14	11	
3	Croatia	5	3	0	1	1	28	9	+19	10	
4	Estonia	5	2	0	0	3	33	25	+8	6	
5	Serbia	5	1	0	0	4	6	43	−37	3	
6	New Zealand	5	0	0	0	5	1	58	−57	0	Relegated to the 2012 Division III

Source: IIHF

=== Group B ===
The tournament was played in Donetsk, Ukraine, from 27 March to 2 April 2011.

Pos	Team	Pld	W	OTW	OTL	L	GF	GA	GD	Pts	Promotion or relegation
1	Ukraine	5	5	0	0	0	51	7	+44	15	Promoted to the 2012 Division I
2	Netherlands	5	3	1	0	1	19	11	+8	11	
3	Lithuania	5	3	0	0	2	44	15	+29	9	
4	Spain	5	2	0	1	2	19	21	−2	7	
5	China	5	1	0	0	4	13	47	−34	3	
6	Belgium	5	0	0	0	5	8	53	−45	0	Relegated to the 2012 Division III

Source: IIHF

== Division III ==
=== Group A ===
The tournament was played in Taipei, Taiwan, from 11 to 17 April 2011. Prior to the start of the tournament, the Mongolian national team announced they would withdraw, citing financial reasons. Group A played a round-robin schedule followed by a classification round.

Pos	Team
1	Australia
2	Chinese Taipei
3	Bulgaria
4	Turkey

Promoted to the 2012 Division II

=== Group B ===
The tournament was played in Mexico City, Mexico, from 13 to 20 March 2011.

Pos	Team	Pld	W	OTW	OTL	L	GF	GA	GD	Pts	Promotion
1	Iceland	4	3	1	0	0	52	5	+47	11	Promoted to the 2012 Division II
2	Mexico	4	3	0	1	0	30	8	+22	10	
3	South Africa	4	2	0	0	2	19	25	−6	6	
4	Israel	4	1	0	0	3	17	24	−7	3	
5	Ireland	4	0	0	0	4	3	59	−56	0	

Source: IIHF

== See also ==
- 2011 World Junior Ice Hockey Championships
- 2011 World U-17 Hockey Challenge
