= Kallela =

Surname list

Kallela is a Finnish and Telugu surname. Notable people with this surname include:

- Niko Kallela (born 1991), Finnish ice hockey player
- Toni Kallela (born 1993), Finnish ice hockey player

== See also ==
- Gallen-Kallela
