= Konkov =

Konkov (Russian: Коньков) is a Russian masculine surname, its feminine counterpart is Konkova. It may refer to

- Anatoliy Konkov (born 1949), Ukrainian football player
- Olga Konkova (born 1969), Norwegian/Russians jazz musician
- Roman Konkov (born 1993), Russian ice hockey player
- Sergei Konkov (born 1982), Russian ice hockey winger
