= Kalle Johansson =

Kalle Johansson may refer to:

- Kalle Johansson (ice hockey) (born 1993), Swedish ice hockey player
- Kalle Johansson (singer) (born 1997), Swedish singer
- Karl Johansson, Swedish orienteering competitor, also known as Kalle Johansson
