= Järveläinen =

Järveläinen is a Finnish surname. Notable people with the surname include:

- Joonas Järveläinen (born 1990), Estonian basketball player
- Ville Järveläinen (born 1993), Finnish ice hockey player
