= Ullberg =

Ullberg is a surname. Notable people with this surname include:

- Irène K:son Ullberg (1930–2022), Swedish painter
- Richard Ullberg (born 1993), Finnish ice hockey player
- Uno Ullberg (1879–1944), Finnish architect

== See also ==
- Ulberg
