= Ulberg =

Ulberg is a surname. Notable people with the surname include:

- Carlos Ulberg (born 1990), New Zealand mixed martial artist
- Paul Ulberg (born 1995), Cook Islands rugby league player
- Pua Ulberg (born 1964), Samoan boxer

== See also ==
- Ullberg
