= Tanner Richard =

Canadian-born Swiss ice hockey player

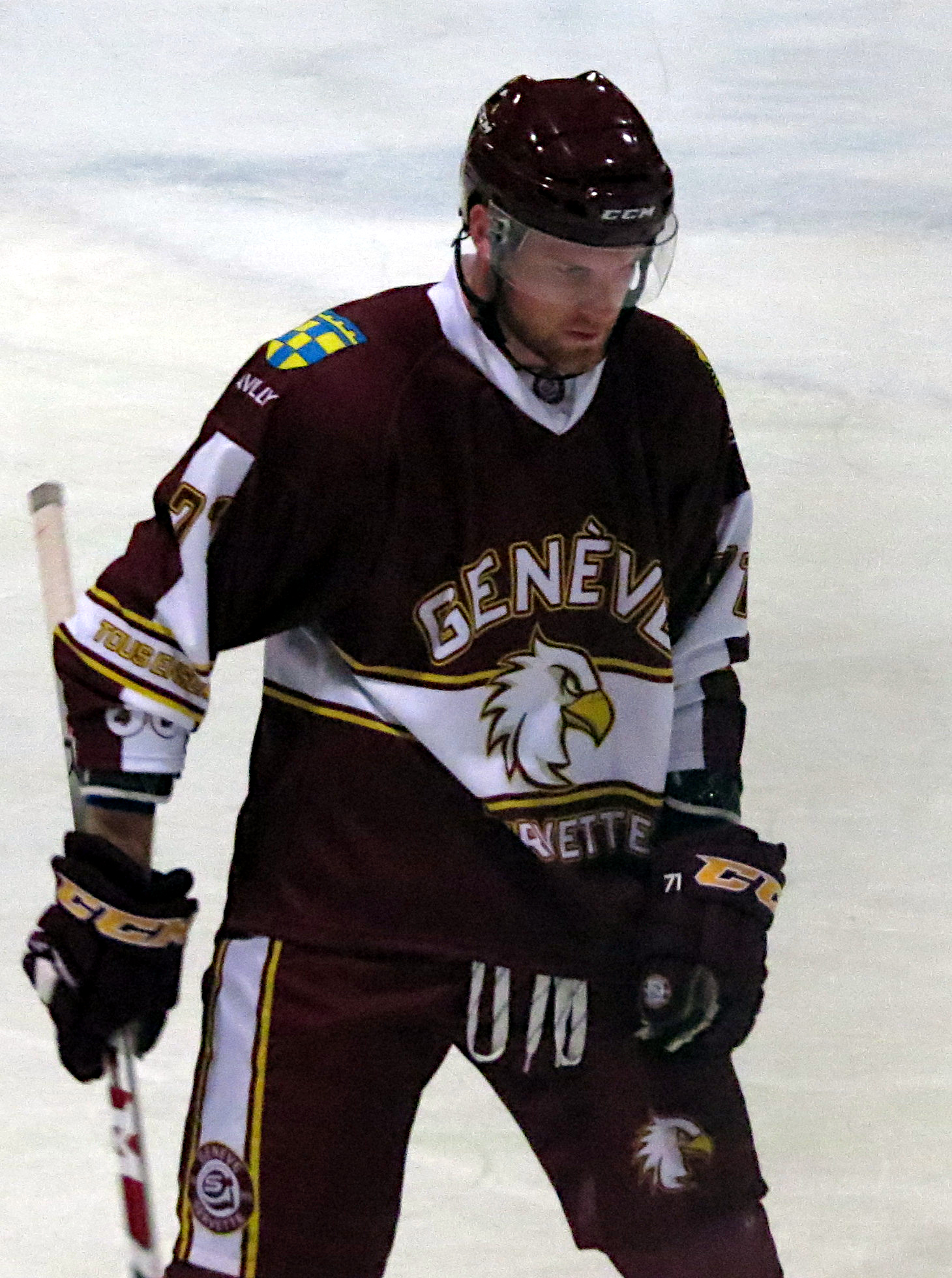
- Richard in 2017 with Genève-Servette HC
- Born: 6 April 1993 (age 33) Markham, Ontario, Canada
- Height: 6 ft 0 in (183 cm)
- Weight: 194 lb (88 kg; 13 st 12 lb)
- Position: Forward
- Shoots: Left
- NL team Former teams: Genève-Servette HC; Rapperswil-Jona Lakers; Tampa Bay Lightning
- National team: Switzerland
- NHL draft: 71st overall, 2012; Tampa Bay Lightning
- Playing career: 2011–present

Tanner Richard (born 6 April 1993) is a Canadian-born Swiss professional ice hockey centre who is currently playing for Genève-Servette HC of the National League (NL). He previously played for the Tampa Bay Lightning of the National Hockey League (NHL).

== Playing career ==
Richard played in the 2006 Quebec International Pee-Wee Hockey Tournament with a youth team from Zürich.

=== Junior ===
Richard made his professional debut during the 2010–11 season playing in the National League with the SC Rapperswil-Jona Lakers. He was selected 71st overall in the 2012 NHL entry draft by the Tampa Bay Lightning. He then relocated to North America and played junior hockey with the Guelph Storm of the Ontario Hockey League.

On 1 April 2013, Richard was signed to a three-year entry-level contract with the Lightning.

=== Professional ===
On 20 December 2016, Richard made his NHL debut, which came in a 4–1 Lightning win over the visiting Detroit Red Wings. On 25 April 2017, Richard left the Syracuse Crunch to join the Switzerland men's national ice hockey team and try to earn a spot for the 2017 IIHF World Championship. It was unknown at the time whether Richard would rejoin the Crunch at a later point if they still remained in the playoffs.

On 28 April 2017, Richard agreed to a two-year contract with Genève-Servette HC of the National League (NL).

On 20 July 2018, Richard was signed to an early two-year contract extension by Geneva, keeping him at the club through the 2020–21 season.

On 9 October 2019, Richard agreed to an early three-year contract extension with Geneva through the 2023/24 season. Following the 2019-20 season, Servette placed Richard on the trade bloc after he only managed to score 2 goals this season and displayed rather weak performances throughout the year.

== International play ==
Richard participated at the 2012 World Junior Ice Hockey Championships as a member of the Switzerland men's national junior ice hockey team.

On 25 April 2017, Richard was added to Switzerland men's national ice hockey team for the 2017 IIHF World Championship.

== Career statistics ==
=== Regular season and playoffs ===
			Regular season					Playoffs
Season	Team	League	GP	G	A	Pts	PIM	GP	G	A	Pts	PIM
2010–11	Rapperswil-Jona Lakers	NLA	4	0	0	0	0	—	—	—	—	—
2011–12	Guelph Storm	OHL	43	13	35	48	46	6	1	4	5	6
2012–13	Guelph Storm	OHL	52	11	51	62	94	5	0	3	3	6
2012–13	Syracuse Crunch	AHL	8	0	3	3	6	—	—	—	—	—
2013–14	Syracuse Crunch	AHL	65	2	15	17	95	—	—	—	—	—
2014–15	Syracuse Crunch	AHL	70	13	25	38	135	2	1	0	1	2
2015–16	Syracuse Crunch	AHL	71	11	43	54	57	—	—	—	—	—
2016–17	Syracuse Crunch	AHL	47	14	20	34	50	—	—	—	—	—
2016–17	Tampa Bay Lightning	NHL	3	0	0	0	2	—	—	—	—	—
2017–18	Genève-Servette HC	NL	49	8	30	38	62	5	0	1	1	2
2018–19	Genève-Servette HC	NL	49	8	28	36	64	6	0	7	7	4
2019–20	Genève-Servette HC	NL	36	2	20	22	28	—	—	—	—	—
2020–21	Genève-Servette HC	NL	41	8	20	28	20	8	1	6	7	2
2021–22	Genève-Servette HC	NL	25	8	10	18	41	2	1	0	1	0
NL totals			204	34	108	142	215	21	2	14	16	8
NHL totals			3	0	0	0	2	—	—	—	—	—

=== International ===
Year	Team	Event	Result	GP	G	A	Pts	PIM
2011	Switzerland	WJC18	7th	6	4	1	5	2
2012	Switzerland	WJC	8th	6	2	2	4	6
2013	Switzerland	WJC	6th	6	0	4	4	8
2017	Switzerland	WC	6th	7	0	4	4	8
Junior totals				18	6	7	13	16
Senior totals				7	0	4	4	8
