= Jeremy Boyce =

Swedish ice hockey player

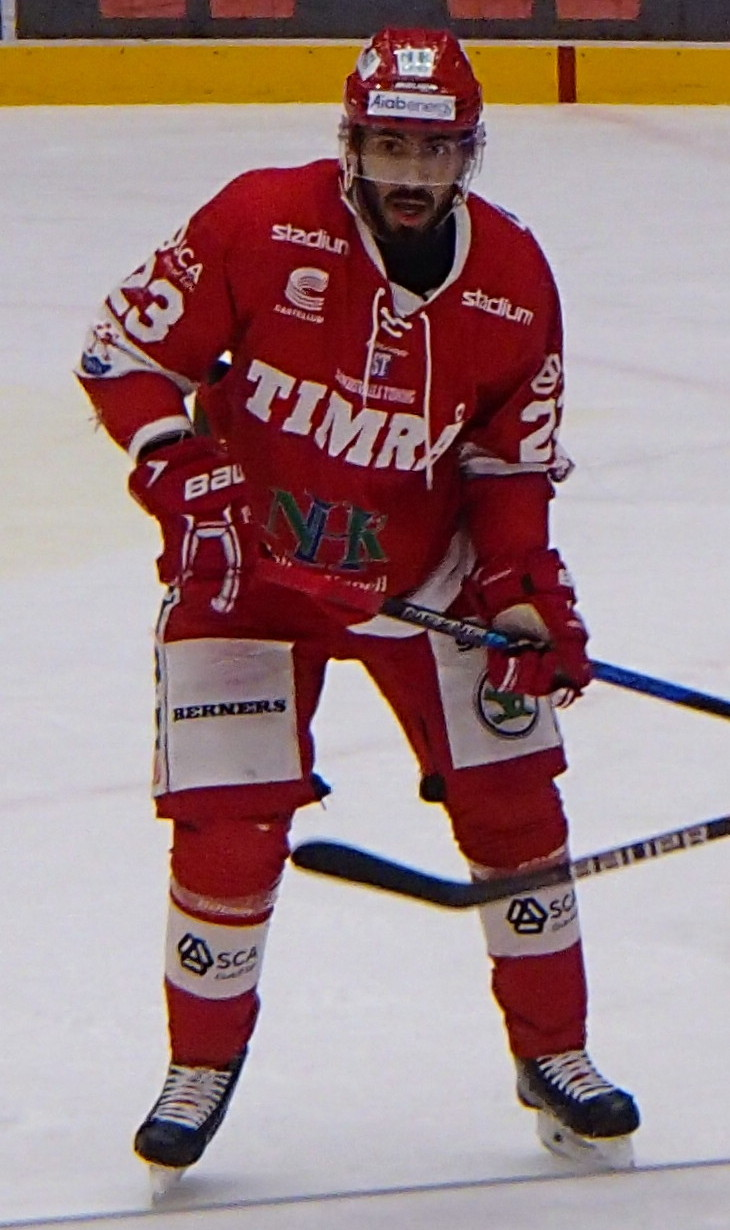
- Born: August 28, 1993 (age 32) Stockholm, Sweden
- Height: 6 ft 0 in (183 cm)
- Weight: 176 lb (80 kg; 12 st 8 lb)
- Position: Forward
- Shoots: Left
- SHL team: Timrå IK
- Playing career: 2010–present

Medal record

Representing Sweden

Ice hockey

World Junior Championships
Gold medal – first place	2012 Calgary	
Silver medal – second place	2013 Ufa	

Jeremy Boyce Rotevall (born August 28, 1993) is a Swedish professional ice hockey player who previously played in the team Timrå IK in the Swedish Hockey League (SHL).

== International play ==
Boyce first competed with Sweden at the junior international level at the 2010 World Under-17 Hockey Challenge claiming the Bronze Medal. He later made his way through the junior ranks with Sweden at the 2011 IIHF World U18 Championships, finishing with the Silver Medal. He then made two appearances with Sweden at the World Junior Championships in 2012 and 2013, collecting a Gold and Silver respectively.
