= Mark McNeill =

Canadian ice hockey player (born 1993)

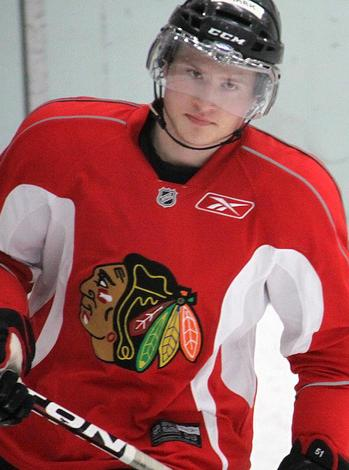
- McNeill with the Chicago Blackhawks in 2011
- Born: February 22, 1993 (age 33) Langley, British Columbia, Canada
- Height: 6 ft 2 in (188 cm)
- Weight: 210 lb (95 kg; 15 st 0 lb)
- Position: Centre
- Shoots: Right
- team Former teams: Free agent Chicago Blackhawks; Dallas Stars; Milwaukee Admirals; Providence Bruins; EHC Black Wings Linz; HC Vita Hästen; Frederikshavn White Hawks; Selber Wölfe
- NHL draft: 18th overall, 2011; Chicago Blackhawks
- Playing career: 2012–present

Mark McNeill (born February 22, 1993) is a Canadian ice hockey forward who is currently a free agent. He last played for Selber Wölfe of the DEL2. He was selected 18th overall by the Chicago Blackhawks in the 2011, and by Vityaz Chekhov in the fifth round (112th overall) of the 2011 KHL Junior Draft.

== Early life ==
McNeill played major junior hockey with the Prince Albert Raiders of the WHL. He has two older siblings, Megan and David, and his parents, Bernie and Pamela, reside in Edmonton.

== Playing career ==
During the 2016–17, while with the Rockford IceHogs, the AHL affiliate, and after four full seasons unable to make the Blackhawks roster, McNeill was traded along with a conditional fourth-round pick to the Dallas Stars in exchange for Johnny Oduya on February 28, 2017.

On June 26, 2017, McNeill, as a restricted free agent, agreed to a one-year, two-way contract extension with the Stars.

During the 2017–18 season, while with the Texas Stars in the AHL, Dallas traded McNeill to the Nashville Predators in exchange for Andrew O'Brien on February 3, 2018. He joined the Predators' AHL affiliate, the Milwaukee Admirals, and recorded 19 points in 31 games.

As a free agent in the off-season, McNeill signed a one-year, two-way contract with the Boston Bruins on July 1, 2018.

After seven professional seasons under contract in the NHL, McNeill left as a free agent and signed his first European contract, a one-year deal, with Austrian club EHC Black Wings Linz of the EBEL on July 2, 2019.

== International play ==
McNeill first played in an international event at the 2010 for Canada Pacific. He was later selected to Canada at the 2011. He appeared in 7 games and collected 6 assists in a fourth-place finish. He again finished fourth with Team Canada at the 2013 World Junior Championships, recording no points through 6 games.

== Career statistics ==
=== Regular season and playoffs ===
			Regular season					Playoffs
Season	Team	League	GP	G	A	Pts	PIM	GP	G	A	Pts	PIM
2008–09	Prince Albert Raiders	WHL	4	0	0	0	0	—	—	—	—	—
2009–10	Prince Albert Raiders	WHL	68	9	15	24	27	—	—	—	—	—
2010–11	Prince Albert Raiders	WHL	70	32	49	81	53	6	2	3	5	2
2011–12	Prince Albert Raiders	WHL	69	31	40	71	48	—	—	—	—	—
2011–12	Rockford IceHogs	AHL	7	0	0	0	12	—	—	—	—	—
2012–13	Prince Albert Raiders	WHL	65	25	42	67	43	4	1	3	4	4
2012–13	Rockford IceHogs	AHL	5	0	0	0	0	—	—	—	—	—
2013–14	Rockford IceHogs	AHL	76	18	19	37	46	—	—	—	—	—
2014–15	Rockford IceHogs	AHL	63	23	21	44	23	8	2	2	4	2
2015–16	Rockford IceHogs	AHL	64	25	23	48	33	3	1	1	2	0
2015–16	Chicago Blackhawks	NHL	1	0	0	0	0	—	—	—	—	—
2016–17	Rockford IceHogs	AHL	58	6	22	28	23	—	—	—	—	—
2016–17	Texas Stars	AHL	21	3	8	11	6	—	—	—	—	—
2016–17	Dallas Stars	NHL	1	0	0	0	0	—	—	—	—	—
2017–18	Texas Stars	AHL	18	5	1	6	36	—	—	—	—	—
2017–18	Milwaukee Admirals	AHL	31	9	10	19	4	—	—	—	—	—
2018–19	Providence Bruins	AHL	56	8	17	25	35	1	0	0	0	0
2019–20	EHC Black Wings Linz	EBEL	27	4	13	17	12	3	0	0	0	2
2020–21	HC Vita Hästen	Allsv	28	5	10	15	14	—	—	—	—	—
2021–22	Frederikshavn White Hawks	DEN	43	9	20	29	12	4	0	2	2	2
NHL totals			2	0	0	0	0	—	—	—	—	—

=== International ===
Year	Team	Event	Result	GP	G	A	Pts	PIM
2010	Canada Pacific	U17	5th	5	1	2	3	4
2011	Canada	U18	4th	7	0	6	6	2
2013	Canada	WJC	4th	6	0	0	0	2
Junior totals				18	1	8	9	8

== Awards and honours ==
Award	Year	Ref
WHL
CHL Top Prospects Game	2011	
AHL
All-Star Game	2015	

Awards and achievements
Preceded by Kevin Hayes	Chicago Blackhawks first-round draft pick 2011	Succeeded by Phillip Danault
