= Joachim Nermark =

Swedish ice hockey player (born 1993)

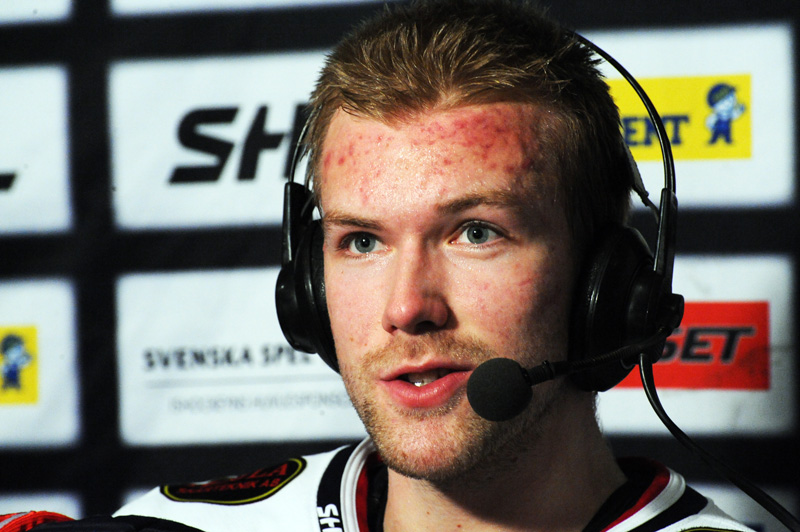
- Born: May 12, 1993 (age 33) Sunne, Sweden
- Height: 6 ft 1 in (185 cm)
- Weight: 187 lb (85 kg; 13 st 5 lb)
- Position: Centre
- Shoots: Left
- Allsv team Former teams: Tingsryds AIF; Linköpings HC; Sparta Warriors
- NHL draft: 93rd overall, 2011; Colorado Avalanche
- Playing career: 2010–present

Joachim Nermark in 2013.

Joachim Nermark (born May 12, 1993) is a Swedish professional ice hockey player who is currently playing with Tingsryds AIF in the HockeyAllsvenskan (Allsv). He previously played with Linköping in Swedish Hockey League (SHL).

== Playing career ==
Nermark was selected in the fourth round, 93rd overall, by the Colorado Avalanche in the 2011 NHL entry draft. After two further seasons with Linköping, Nermark's NHL rights were relinquished by the Avalanche.

In his fourth season with Linköping in a depth role, Nermark was unable to increase his presence with the club, posting just 1 goal and 2 points in 41 games during the 2013–14 season. On January 15, 2014, he was loaned to the HockeyAllsvenskan with Rögle BK. He was brought to the club, by Anders Carlsson who had drafted him whilst with the Colorado Avalanche. Nermark played in 15 games with Rögle before returning to Linköpings for the playoffs. Upon their elimination, Nermark attempted to again help Rögle in their unsuccessful promotion bid. After the season, it was announced on April 10 that Nermark would not receive a new contract offer from Linköpings.

On May 20, 2014, amongst multiple offers from Allsvenskan sides, Nermark opted to sign a contract with Asplöven HC. In the 2014–15 season, Nermark enjoyed his most productive professional season in compiling 6 goals and 21 points in 45 games. Nermark was not retained by Asplöven, but continued in the Allsvenskan in signing a one-year contract with fellow competitors in HC Vita Hästen on April 16, 2015.

After a single season with HC Vita, Nermark signed his first contract abroad in agreeing to a one-year deal with Norwegian-based club Sparta Sarpsborg on April 18, 2016.

== International play ==
Medal record

Representing Sweden

Ice hockey

Ivan Hlinka Memorial Tournament
| Bronze medal – third place | 2010 Slovakia | |

World Under-17 Hockey Challenge
| Bronze medal – third place | 2010 Canada | |

IIHF World U18 Championship
| Silver medal – second place | 2010 Belarus | |
| Silver medal – second place | 2011 Germany | |

Nermark was the tournament scoring leader in the 2010 Ivan Hlinka Memorial Tournament with five goals and six assists in five games as the Swedes took home the Bronze.

== Career statistics ==
=== Regular season and playoffs ===
| | | | Regular season | | | | | Playoffs |
| Season | Team | League | GP | G | A | Pts | PIM | GP | G | A | Pts | PIM |
|---|---|---|---|---|---|---|---|---|---|---|---|---|
| 2009–10 | Leksand | J20 | 35 | 6 | 7 | 13 | 2 | 5 | 1 | 1 | 2 | 0 |
| 2010–11 | Linköpings HC | J20 | 37 | 8 | 18 | 26 | 16 | 3 | 0 | 0 | 0 | 0 |
| 2010–11 | Linköpings HC | SEL | 12 | 0 | 1 | 1 | 2 | — | — | — | — | — |
| 2011–12 | Linköpings HC | J20 | 31 | 8 | 13 | 21 | 14 | 6 | 1 | 4 | 5 | 0 |
| 2011–12 | Linköpings HC | SEL | 17 | 0 | 0 | 0 | 2 | — | — | — | — | — |
| 2011–12 | Borås HC | Allsv | 12 | 1 | 0 | 1 | 0 | — | — | — | — | — |
| 2012–13 | Linköpings HC | J20 | 9 | 3 | 4 | 7 | 0 | 2 | 0 | 0 | 0 | 0 |
| 2012–13 | Linköpings HC | SEL | 53 | 1 | 3 | 4 | 2 | 10 | 0 | 0 | 0 | 2 |
| 2013–14 | Linköpings HC | SHL | 41 | 1 | 1 | 2 | 2 | 9 | 0 | 2 | 2 | 0 |
| 2013–14 | Rögle BK | Allsv | 15 | 3 | 1 | 4 | 2 | 4 | 0 | 0 | 0 | 0 |
| 2014–15 | Asplöven HC | Allsv | 49 | 6 | 15 | 21 | 18 | — | — | — | — | — |
| 2015–16 | HC Vita Hästen | Allsv | 46 | 5 | 11 | 16 | 6 | — | — | — | — | — |
| 2016–17 | Sparta Warriors | GET | 25 | 0 | 13 | 13 | 10 | 11 | 1 | 3 | 4 | 6 |
| 2017–18 | Sparta Warriors | GET | 39 | 7 | 13 | 20 | 2 | 10 | 0 | 0 | 0 | 4 |
| 2018–19 | Tingsryds AIF | Allsv | 50 | 7 | 8 | 15 | 8 | — | — | — | — | — |
| 2019–20 | Tingsryds AIF | Allsv | 52 | 4 | 12 | 16 | 16 | — | — | — | — | — |
| 2020–21 | Tingsryds AIF | Allsv | 52 | 6 | 11 | 17 | 20 | 2 | 1 | 0 | 1 | 0 |
| 2021–22 | Tingsryds AIF | Allsv | 39 | 8 | 10 | 18 | 18 | — | — | — | — | — |
| 2022–23 | Tingsryds AIF | Allsv | 37 | 3 | 7 | 10 | 10 | — | — | — | — | — |
| 2023–24 | Tingsryds AIF | Allsv | 52 | 3 | 11 | 14 | 6 | — | — | — | — | — |
| 2024–25 | Tingsryds AIF | Allsv | 33 | 3 | 4 | 7 | 8 | — | — | — | — | — |
| SHL totals | | | 123 | 2 | 5 | 7 | 8 | 19 | 0 | 2 | 2 | 2 |

=== International ===
| Year | Team | Event | Result | GP | G | A | Pts | PIM |
|---|---|---|---|---|---|---|---|---|
| 2010 | Sweden | U17 | 3rd place, bronze medalist(s) | 6 | 1 | 4 | 5 | 0 |
| 2010 | Sweden | U18 | 2nd place, silver medalist(s) | 6 | 0 | 3 | 3 | 2 |
| 2010 | Sweden | IH18 | 3rd place, bronze medalist(s) | 5 | 5 | 6 | 11 | 4 |
| 2011 | Sweden | U18 | 2nd place, silver medalist(s) | 5 | 1 | 0 | 1 | 4 |
| Junior totals | | | | 22 | 7 | 13 | 20 | 10 |
