= Tyler Biggs =

American ice hockey player (born 1993)

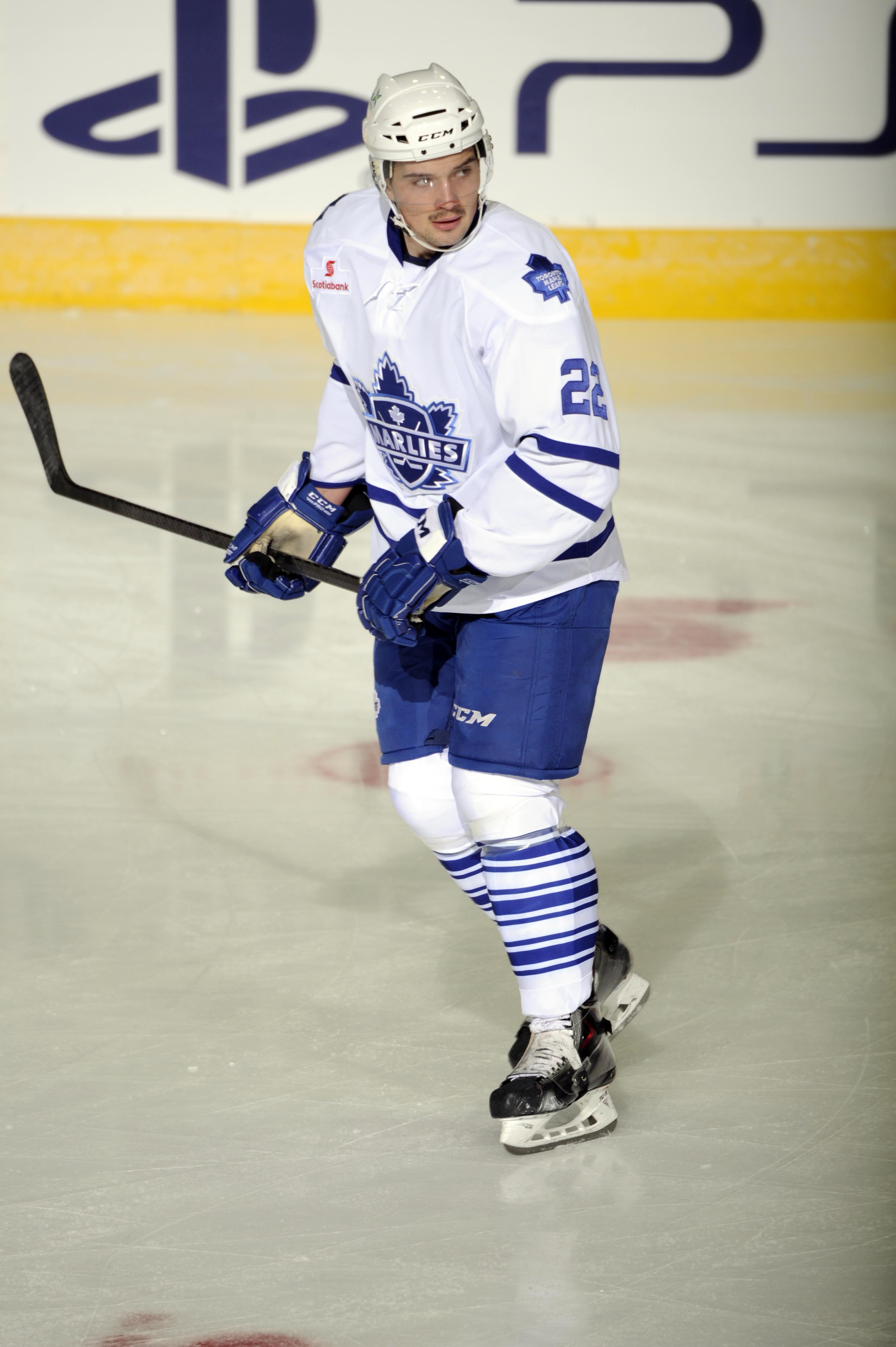
- Biggs with the Toronto Marlies in 2013
- Born: April 30, 1993 (age 33) Binghamton, New York, U.S.
- Height: 6 ft 2 in (188 cm)
- Weight: 205 lb (93 kg; 14 st 9 lb)
- Position: Right wing
- Shot: Right
- Played for: Toronto Marlies; WBS Penguins; Nottingham Panthers
- NHL draft: 22nd overall, 2011; Toronto Maple Leafs
- Playing career: 2013–2019

Tyler Austin Biggs (born April 30, 1993) is an American former professional ice hockey player. Biggs was selected in the first round, 22nd overall, in the 2011 NHL entry draft by the Toronto Maple Leafs.

== Playing career ==
He played for the Toronto Jr. Canadiens during the 2008–09 season while enrolled at Loveland High School, then transferred to Pioneer High School in Ann Arbor, Michigan, the following fall, to join the USA Hockey National Team Development Program. Biggs played one season with the Miami RedHawks of the Central Collegiate Hockey Association (CCHA) before joining the Oshawa Generals of the Ontario Hockey League for the 2012–13 OHL season.

On July 1, 2015, Biggs was traded to the Pittsburgh Penguins with Phil Kessel, Tim Erixon, and a 2016 2nd round pick for Scott Harrington, Nick Spaling, Kasperi Kapanen, and Pittsburgh's 3rd round pick in the 2016 NHL entry draft along with a conditional pick exchange between the teams depending on Pittsburgh's 2016 NHL regular season performance. Toronto also retained 15% of Kessel's salary in this trade.

After two seasons with the Kalamazoo Wings in the ECHL, Biggs left North America as a free agent in signed a one-year contract with UK-based club, the Nottingham Panthers of the Elite Ice Hockey League (EIHL) on July 14, 2018. Biggs featured in 24 games with the Panthers, recording 4 goals and 9 points, before opting to return to the ECHL with former club, the Kalamazoo Wings, for the remainder of the 2018–19 season, on December 8, 2018.

== Personal life ==
The son of former NHL centre Don Biggs, Tyler Biggs was born in Binghamton, New York, and grew up in Loveland, Ohio.

As of 2022, he is an EMT in Seattle, Washington.

== International play ==
Medal record

Ice hockey

Representing United States

World Under-17 Hockey Challenge
Gold medal – first place	2010 WHC U17	

IIHF World U18 Championship
Gold medal – first place	2010 WJC U18	
Gold medal – first place	2011 WJC U18	

World Junior Championships
Gold medal – first place	2013 Ufa	

Biggs represented the United States internationally, playing for Team USA in the 2010 World U-17 Hockey Challenge, scoring five goals and adding an assist in six games, helping the U.S. to a gold medal finish. That same season, he competed for Team USA in the 2010 IIHF World U18 Championships, finishing the tournament with no points in seven games. A year later, he played in the 2011 IIHF World U18 Championships and scored two goals and one assist in six games during the tournament, including the overtime goal in the semifinal round against Canada.

== Career statistics ==
=== Regular season and playoffs ===
			Regular season					Playoffs
Season	Team	League	GP	G	A	Pts	PIM	GP	G	A	Pts	PIM
2008–09	Toronto Jr. Canadiens AAA	GTHL U16	72	40	46	86	70	—	—	—	—	—
2008–09	Toronto Jr. Canadiens	OJHL	3	0	0	0	2	3	2	0	2	0
2009–10	U.S. NTDP Juniors	USHL	24	6	5	11	54	—	—	—	—	—
2009–10	U.S. NTDP U17	USDP	40	15	8	23	85	—	—	—	—	—
2009–10	U.S. NTDP U18	USDP	13	1	1	2	6	—	—	—	—	—
2010–11	U.S. NTDP Juniors	USHL	20	7	4	11	41	—	—	—	—	—
2010–11	U.S. NTDP U18	USDP	55	19	12	31	161	—	—	—	—	—
2011–12	Miami RedHawks	CCHA	37	9	8	17	63	—	—	—	—	—
2012–13	Oshawa Generals	OHL	60	26	27	53	55	9	0	1	1	13
2012–13	Toronto Marlies	AHL	4	1	0	1	0	1	0	0	0	0
2013–14	Toronto Marlies	AHL	57	7	2	9	39	3	0	0	0	4
2014–15	Toronto Marlies	AHL	47	2	3	5	56	—	—	—	—	—
2014–15	Orlando Solar Bears	ECHL	8	4	2	6	16	—	—	—	—	—
2015–16	Wilkes-Barre/Scranton Penguins	AHL	11	1	1	2	11	1	0	0	0	4
2015–16	Wheeling Nailers	ECHL	2	1	0	1	16	—	—	—	—	—
2016–17	Kalamazoo Wings	ECHL	58	13	19	32	42	7	0	5	5	8
2017–18	Kalamazoo Wings	ECHL	55	18	21	39	60	—	—	—	—	—
2018–19	Nottingham Panthers	EIHL	24	4	5	9	57	—	—	—	—	—
2018–19	Kalamazoo Wings	ECHL	13	4	5	9	18	—	—	—	—	—
AHL totals			119	11	6	17	106	5	0	0	0	8

=== International ===
Year	Team	Event	Result	GP	G	A	Pts	PIM
2010	United States	U17	1st place, gold medalist(s)	6	5	1	6	2
2010	United States	WJC18	1st place, gold medalist(s)	7	0	0	0	4
2011	United States	WJC18	1st place, gold medalist(s)	6	2	1	3	49
2013	United States	WJC	1st place, gold medalist(s)	7	0	1	1	8
Junior totals				26	7	3	10	63

Awards and achievements
Preceded by Nazem Kadri	Toronto Maple Leafs first-round draft pick 2011	Succeeded by Stuart Percy
