= Reid Boucher =

American ice hockey player (born 1993)

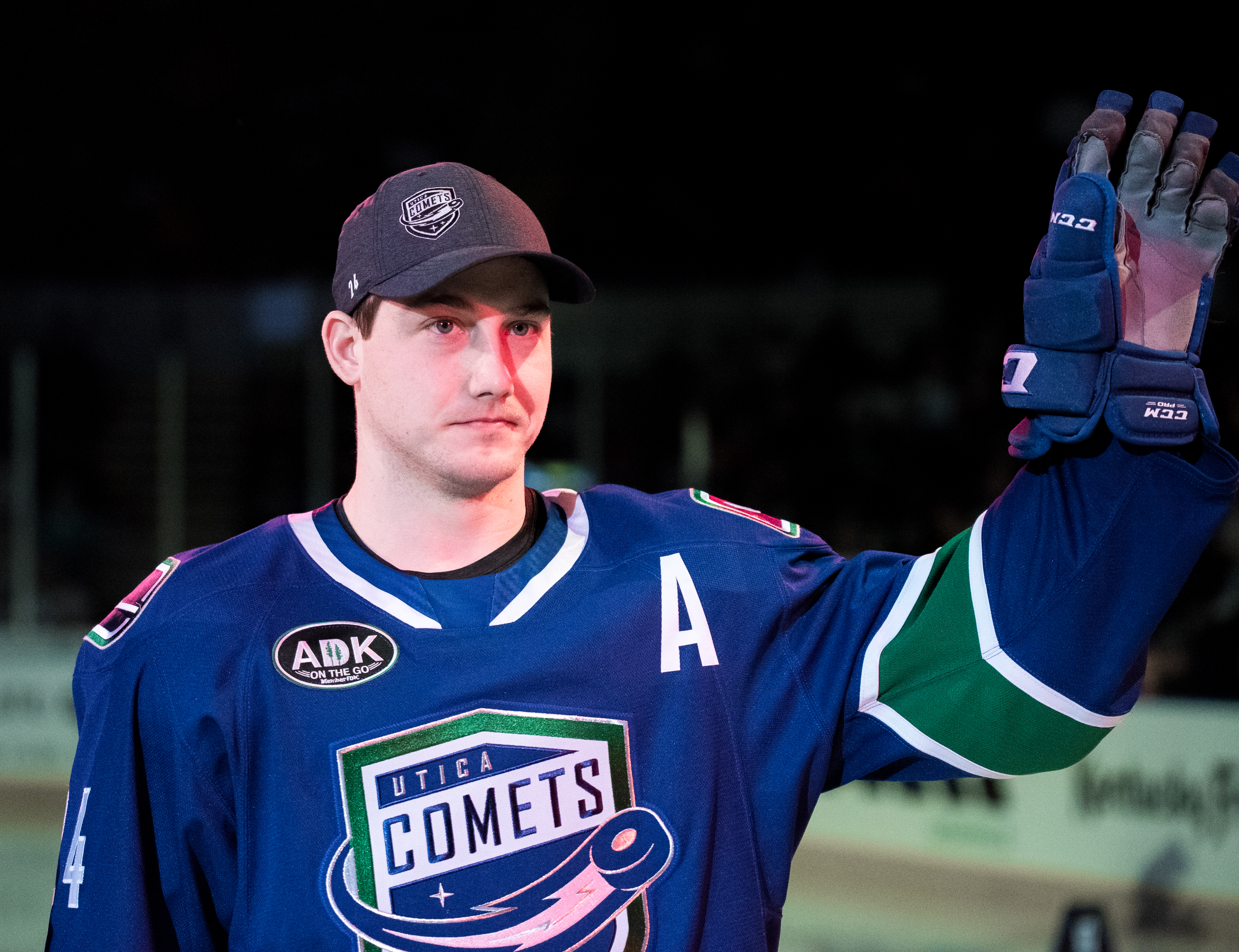
- Boucher with the Utica Comets in 2019
- Born: September 8, 1993 (age 32) Grand Ledge, Michigan, U.S.
- Height: 5 ft 11 in (180 cm)
- Weight: 194 lb (88 kg; 13 st 12 lb)
- Position: Forward
- Shoots: Left
- team Former teams: Free agent New Jersey Devils; Nashville Predators; Vancouver Canucks; Avangard Omsk; Lokomotiv Yaroslavl; Avtomobilist Yekaterinburg
- NHL draft: 99th overall, 2011; New Jersey Devils
- Playing career: 2012–present

Reid Boucher (born September 8, 1993) is an American professional ice hockey player who is a forward who is currently an unrestricted free agent. He most recently played for Avtomobilist Yekaterinburg of the Kontinental Hockey League (KHL). Boucher has previously played in the National Hockey League (NHL) for the New Jersey Devils, Nashville Predators and Vancouver Canucks after being selected by the Devils in the fourth round (99th overall) in the 2011 NHL entry draft.

== Playing career ==
As a youth, Boucher played in the 2006 Quebec International Pee-Wee Hockey Tournament with the Detroit Compuware minor ice hockey team.

=== Junior ===
In his second season with the Sarnia Sting of the Ontario Hockey League, Boucher broke the former 58 goals in a season record in the team held by NHL player Steven Stamkos with his fifth hat trick in the season against Saginaw Spirit. Boucher was rewarded for his outstanding play during the 2012–13 OHL season by being named to the OHL's First All-Star Team.

=== Professional ===
==== New Jersey Devils ====
On March 13, 2013, the New Jersey Devils signed Boucher to a three-year entry-level contract. Reid scored one goal and had two assists in his first game with Albany in the 2012–13 season debut on March 30, 2013.

On December 4, 2013, Boucher was promoted to the Devils for the first time, following an injury to Ryan Carter. He got an assist and was plus 2 in his debut and became the first Devil to score in a shootout that season. Boucher scored his first NHL goal on December 18, 2013, against Robin Lehner of the Ottawa Senators in a 5–2 win.

In the 2016–17 season, having made the Devils opening season roster, Boucher was unable to make an impact in a depth role, appearing in just 9 games over the opening months of the season with the Devils.

==== Nashville Predators ====
On December 3, 2016, Boucher's 6-year tenure with the Devils ended as he was claimed off waivers by the Nashville Predators. He made his debut with Nashville the following day against the Philadelphia Flyers before he was sent on an conditioning assigned to affiliate, the Milwaukee Admirals on December 12, 2016.

==== Vancouver Canucks ====
On January 1, 2017, Boucher was placed on waivers by the Predators. The following day, he was reclaimed by the Devils, but was again waived on January 3. On January 4, 2017, Boucher was claimed by the Vancouver Canucks. Boucher was scratched in all but one of the Canucks' games in January before drawing into the roster. He scored his first goal with Vancouver on February 28 against the Detroit Red Wings, scoring a late game-tying goal before the Canucks lost 3–2 in overtime. On March 25, he recorded his first multi-goal game; scoring twice in a 4–2 victory over the Minnesota Wild.

On July 24, 2017, the Canucks re-signed Boucher to a one-year, one-way contract worth $687,500, avoiding arbitration.

==== Avangard Omsk ====
After four seasons within the Canucks organization and failing to appear in the NHL during the 2019–20 season, Boucher as an impending free agent opted to pursue a career abroad by agreeing to an initial one-year contract with Russian club, Avangard Omsk of the KHL, on June 23, 2020. In the 2020–21 season, Boucher quickly established himself as an instrumental part of the offence, contributing with 24 goals and 24 assists for 48 points in just 51 regular season games to lead the club in scoring. He contributed with 17 points through 21 playoff contests, helping Avangard claim the Gagarin Cup for the first time in franchise history.

==== Lokomotiv Yaroslavl ====
On June 11, 2021, Boucher was traded by Avangard to Lokomotiv Yaroslavl in exchange for financial compensation. He was then signed to a two-year contract extension with Lokomotiv. Boucher completed the regular season with Lokomotiv, compiling 12 goals and 27 points through 46 games. Before appearing in the playoffs, his contract was terminated by the team on January 23, 2022 .

==== Return to Avangard ====
As a free agent moving into the off-season following his release from Lokomotiv, Boucher agreed to return to former KHL club, Avangard Omsk, signing a one-year contract on June 18, 2022.

==== Avtomobilist Yekaterinburg ====
On June 3, 2025, Boucher signed a one-year contract with Avtomobilist Yekaterinburg, his third KHL team in six seasons.

== Sexual assault ==
In January 2022, Boucher pleaded guilty to "sexually assaulting a minor" in 2011; the girl he assaulted was 12 at the time and he was 17.

== Career statistics ==
=== Regular season and playoffs ===
			Regular season					Playoffs
Season	Team	League	GP	G	A	Pts	PIM	GP	G	A	Pts	PIM
2009–10	U.S. NTDP Juniors	USHL	24	10	4	14	22	—	—	—	—	—
2009–10	U.S. NTDP U17	USDP	41	17	13	30	38	—	—	—	—	—
2009–10	U.S. NTDP U18	USDP	1	0	0	0	0	—	—	—	—	—
2010–11	U.S. NTDP Juniors	USHL	24	14	6	20	13	—	—	—	—	—
2010–11	U.S. NTDP U18	USDP	57	32	22	54	35	—	—	—	—	—
2011–12	Sarnia Sting	OHL	67	28	22	50	19	6	2	1	3	4
2011–12	Albany Devils	AHL	1	0	0	0	0	—	—	—	—	—
2012–13	Sarnia Sting	OHL	68	62	33	95	53	4	2	3	5	4
2012–13	Albany Devils	AHL	11	3	2	5	6	—	—	—	—	—
2013–14	Albany Devils	AHL	56	22	16	38	10	4	1	0	1	0
2013–14	New Jersey Devils	NHL	23	2	5	7	4	—	—	—	—	—
2014–15	Albany Devils	AHL	62	15	15	30	36	—	—	—	—	—
2014–15	New Jersey Devils	NHL	11	1	0	1	0	—	—	—	—	—
2015–16	New Jersey Devils	NHL	39	8	11	19	6	—	—	—	—	—
2015–16	Albany Devils	AHL	34	19	13	32	4	11	4	6	10	4
2016–17	New Jersey Devils	NHL	9	0	2	2	2	—	—	—	—	—
2016–17	Nashville Predators	NHL	3	1	0	1	0	—	—	—	—	—
2016–17	Milwaukee Admirals	AHL	5	4	1	5	0	—	—	—	—	—
2016–17	Vancouver Canucks	NHL	27	5	2	7	6	—	—	—	—	—
2017–18	Utica Comets	AHL	45	25	21	46	35	3	3	0	3	0
2017–18	Vancouver Canucks	NHL	20	3	2	5	0	—	—	—	—	—
2018–19	Utica Comets	AHL	56	31	31	62	16	—	—	—	—	—
2018–19	Vancouver Canucks	NHL	1	0	0	0	0	—	—	—	—	—
2019–20	Utica Comets	AHL	53	34	33	67	45	—	—	—	—	—
2020–21	Avangard Omsk	KHL	51	24	24	48	49	21	8	9	17	16
2021–22	Lokomotiv Yaroslavl	KHL	46	12	15	27	40	—	—	—	—	—
2022–23	Avangard Omsk	KHL	64	31	24	55	65	14	9	6	15	6
2023–24	Avangard Omsk	KHL	64	44	34	78	34	12	9	2	11	8
2024–25	Avangard Omsk	KHL	52	28	21	49	34	13	5	3	8	4
2025–26	Avtomobilist Yekaterinburg	KHL	43	17	25	42	6	—	—	—	—	—
NHL totals			133	20	22	42	18	—	—	—	—	—
KHL totals			320	156	143	299	228	60	31	20	51	34

Medal record

Representing United States

Ice hockey

World U18 Championships
Gold medal – first place	2011 Germany	

World U-17 Hockey Challenge
Gold medal – first place	2008 Canada	

=== International ===
Year	Team	Event	GP	G	A	Pts	PIM
2010	United States	U17	6	2	5	7	2
2011	United States	U18	6	8	2	10	8
Junior totals			12	10	7	17	10

== Awards and honours ==
Award	Year	Ref
OHL
First All-Star Team	2012–13	
AHL
All-Star Game	2018, 2019, 2020	
First All-Star Team	2020	
KHL
Gagarin Cup champion	2021	
