= Karol Korím =

Slovak ice hockey player

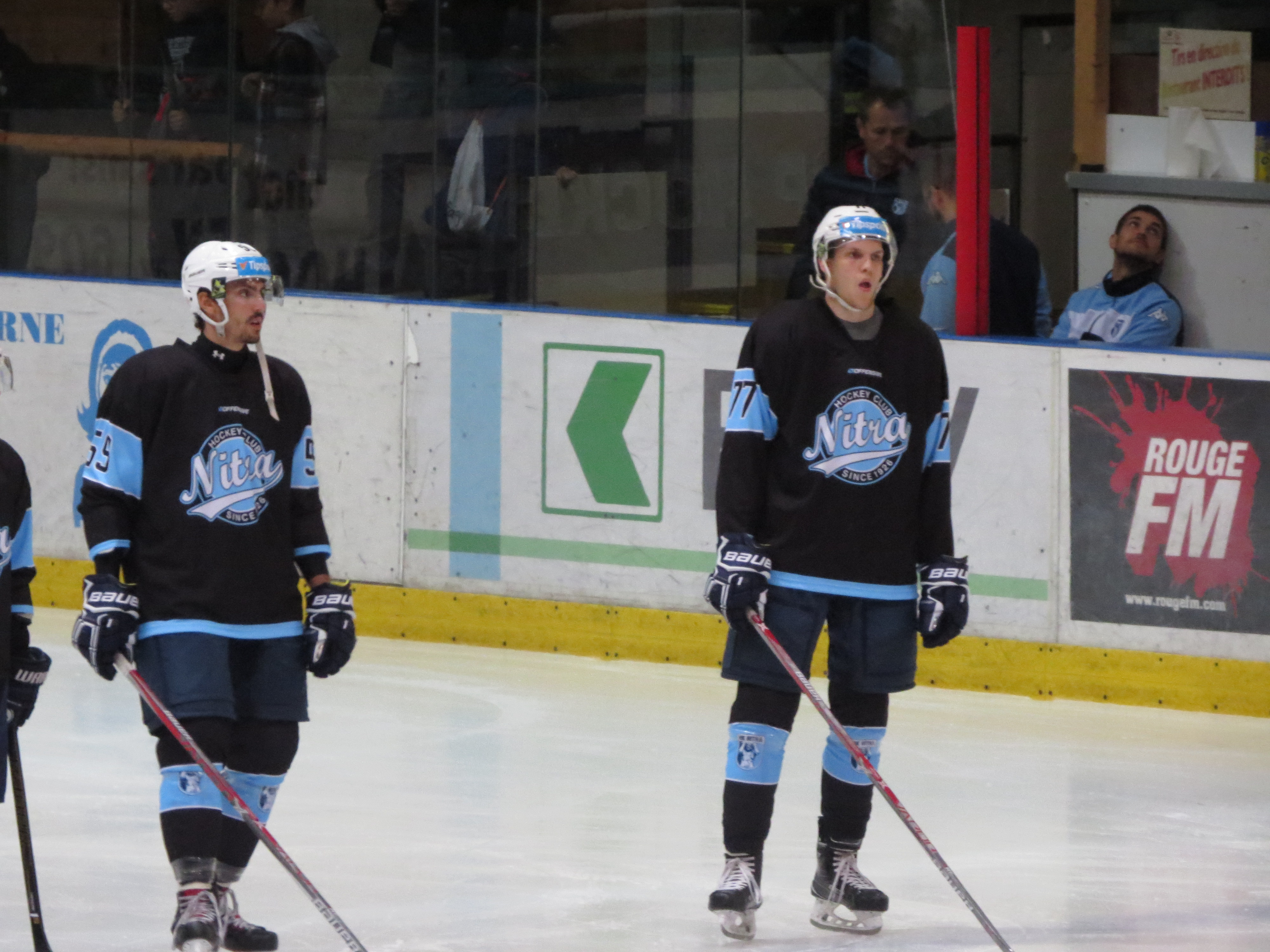
- Game between the Langnau Tigers and Nitra on August 11, 2017 in Le Sentier (Hockeyades), 77 Kuzma Filip, 59 Korim Karol
- Born: August 20, 1993 (age 32) Nitra, Slovakia
- Height: 6 ft 3 in (191 cm)
- Weight: 203 lb (92 kg; 14 st 7 lb)
- Position: Defence
- Shoots: Left
- Slovak 1. Liga team Former teams: HC Topoľčany; HK Nitra; HC Dynamo Pardubice; BK Havlíčkův Brod; LHK Jestřábi Prostějov; HC Dukla Jihlava; AZ Havířov; MHk 32 Liptovský Mikuláš; HK Levice; HK Martin; HC 07 Detva
- NHL draft: Undrafted
- Playing career: 2012–present

Karol Korím (born August 20, 1993) is a Slovak professional ice hockey defenceman. He currently plays for HC Topoľčany of the Slovak 1. Liga.

Korím made his Czech Extraliga debut playing with HC Pardubice during the 2013–14 Czech Extraliga season.

== Career statistics ==
=== Regular season and playoffs ===
			Regular season
Season	Team	League	GP	G	A	Pts	PIM	GP	G	A	Pts	PIM

=== International ===
Year	Team	Event	Result	GP	G	A	Pts	PIM
2011	Slovakia	WJC18	10th	6	1	3	4	10
2013	Slovakia	WJC	8th	6	0	1	1	2
Junior totals				12	1	4	5	12
