= Robbie Russo =

American ice hockey player (born 1993)

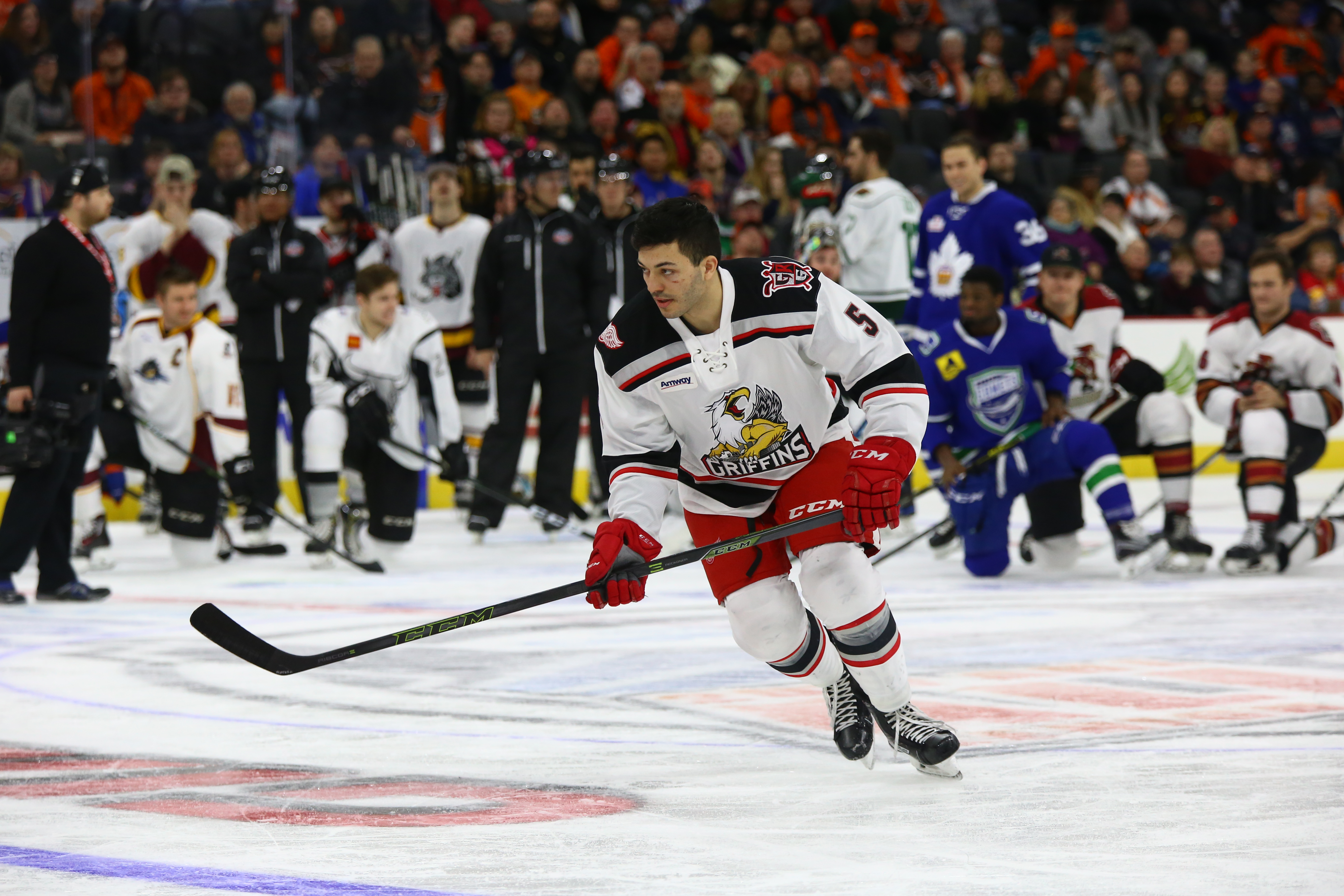
- Russo with the Grand Rapids Griffins in 2017
- Born: February 15, 1993 (age 33) Westmont, Illinois, U.S.
- Height: 6 ft 0 in (183 cm)
- Weight: 191 lb (87 kg; 13 st 9 lb)
- Position: Defense
- Shoots: Right
- AHL team Former teams: Tucson Roadrunners; Detroit Red Wings
- NHL draft: 95th overall, 2011; New York Islanders
- Playing career: 2011–present

Robbie Victor Russo (born February 15, 1993) is an American professional ice hockey defenseman for the Tucson Roadrunners of the American Hockey League (AHL). Russo was selected in the fourth round (95th overall) by the New York Islanders in the 2011 NHL entry draft.

== Playing career ==
=== Amateur ===
Russo played for the USA Hockey National Team Development Program during the 2009–10 and 2010–11 seasons. As a member of the USA Under-17 team in 2009–10, Russo recorded seven goals and 24 assists in 52 games. As a member of the USA Under-18 team in 2010–11, Russo served as team captain, where he ranked sixth in team scoring with four goals and 26 assists in 60 games.

=== College ===
In 2011, Russo enrolled at the University of Notre Dame and skated four seasons with the NCAA Division I Fighting Irish men's ice hockey team. During his freshman season, Russo recorded four goals and 11 assists, in 40 games. Among CCHA rookies, Russo tied for 15th in overall scoring and was the top freshmen defenseman in scoring with 15 points. He recorded his first career collegiate point with an assist on October 8, and recorded his first career collegiate goal on October 28, 2011. Following an outstanding rookie season, he was named to the 2011–12 CCHA All-Rookie Team, and named Notre Dame's rookie of the year.

During his sophomore season, he led the Fighting Irish defensemen in scoring with five goals and 18 assists in 41 games, and was second among CCHA defensemen with 23 points. He was named the CCHA Gladiator defensive player of the week for the week ending November 19, 2012, after recording two goals and an assist in a two-game sweep against Michigan. That marked the first time since February 3–4, 1978 that the Irish had won a series at Yost Ice Arena. He helped lead Notre Dame to the 2013 CCHA Tournament championship.

During his junior season, Russo recorded four goals and 11 assists in 21 games, before being declared academically ineligible in January 2014. He was named to the Shillelagh Tournament All-Tournament Team.

During his senior season, Russo recorded 15 goals and 26 assists in 40 games. His 15 goals were tied for first, along with Joey LaLeggia, among all defensemen in goals scored, while his 41 points were ranked second, one point shy of Mike Reilly for the national league among all defensemen. Russo's 41 points were the most by a Hockey East defenseman since at least the 2000–01 season. Russo was named the Hockey East Defensive Player of the Week for the week ending December 8, 2014. He was named to the Florida College Hockey Classic All-Tournament Team, after blocking four shots, and posting a +3 plus-minus during the tournament.

On January 18, 2015, Russo recorded the only hat-trick in the nation by a defenseman, becoming the first Notre Dame defenseman to do so since Frank O'Brien on February 20, 1988. Russo was named the Hockey East Player of the Week for the week ending January 19, 2015. On February 12, 2015, he was named a team captain. Following an outstanding senior season, Russo was named to the 2014–15 Hockey East First All-Star Team, the East Second-Team All-American, and CCM Hockey All-American. Russo became the fifth Notre Dame defenseman to earn All-America honors and the first since Ian Cole in 2009.

=== Professional ===
On August 16, 2015, Russo signed a two-year entry-level contract with the Detroit Red Wings. Russo was named the CCM/AHL Player of the Week for the week ending February 28, 2016. Russo recorded two goals and five assists, along with a plus-8 rating as the Grand Rapids Griffins finished the week a perfect 4–0. He became the second Griffins defenseman ever to earn the player of the week honor, following Clay Wilson on December 26, 2005.

During the 2015–16 season, Russo recorded five goals and 34 assists in 65 games for the Griffins, while posting a league-leading plus-47 rating that is tied for the highest mark by an AHL player since 1993. Following an outstanding rookie season, he was named to the 2015–16 AHL All-Rookie Team, and the AHL Second All-Star Team.

On March 6, 2017, Russo was recalled by the Detroit Red Wings. He made his NHL debut the following evening, on March 7, in a game against the Toronto Maple Leafs. Prior to being recalled, Russo recorded seven goals and 24 assists in 56 games for the Griffins. Following the conclusion of the Red Wings season, Russo was assigned to the Griffins. Russo appeared in 19 games for the Red Wings, averaging 16:04 time on ice and recording 18 shots on goal, 24 hits and 13 blocked shots. On September 5, 2017, the Red Wings signed Russo to a two-year contract extension.

On June 24, 2018, the Red Wings traded Russo to the Arizona Coyotes in exchange for a conditional seventh-round draft pick in the 2019 NHL entry draft. He spent the entirety of the 2018–19 season with the Coyotes' American League affiliate, the Tucson Roadrunners.

On June 5, 2019, the Coyotes re-signed Russo to a one-year, two-way contract extension.

Following two seasons within the Coyotes organization, Russo left the club as a free agent leading into the pandemic delayed 2020–21 season. Unable to secure an NHL contract, Russo agreed to a professional tryout deal with the San Jose Barracuda of the AHL on January 14, 2021. In the shortened 2020–21 season, Russo contributed with 2 goals and 15 points through 34 regular season games.

As a free agent following his stint with the Barracuda, Russo secured an NHL contract in agreeing to a two-year, two-way contract with the New Jersey Devils on July 29, 2021.

On May 19, 2023, Russo signed a one-year contract with the Utica Comets of the American Hockey League (AHL).

After three seasons with the Comets, Russo left as a free agent and returned to former AHL club, the Tucson Roadrunners, signing a one-year contract on July 10, 2024.

== International play ==
Medal record

Representing United States

Ice hockey

World U-17 Hockey Challenge
Gold medal – first place	2010 Canada	

IIHF World U18 Championship
Gold medal – first place	2011 Germany	

Russo represented the United States at the 2011 IIHF U18 Championships, where he was captain, and helped lead his team to a gold medal. He recorded one goal and seven assists in six games, including setting up the overtime game-winning goal in the gold medal game against Sweden. He was named one of Team USA's top three players of the tournament.

== Career statistics ==
=== Regular season and playoffs ===
			Regular season					Playoffs
Season	Team	League	GP	G	A	Pts	PIM	GP	G	A	Pts	PIM
2009–10	U.S. National Development Team	USHL	34	3	17	20	36	—	—	—	—	—
2010–11	U.S. National Development Team	USHL	24	0	6	6	11	—	—	—	—	—
2011–12	Notre Dame	CCHA	40	4	11	15	14	—	—	—	—	—
2012–13	Notre Dame	CCHA	41	5	18	23	40	—	—	—	—	—
2013–14	Notre Dame	HE	21	4	11	15	8	—	—	—	—	—
2014–15	Notre Dame	HE	40	15	26	41	20	—	—	—	—	—
2015–16	Grand Rapids Griffins	AHL	71	5	34	39	42	9	1	4	5	9
2016–17	Grand Rapids Griffins	AHL	58	7	25	32	37	19	0	7	7	22
2016–17	Detroit Red Wings	NHL	19	0	0	0	2	—	—	—	—	—
2017–18	Grand Rapids Griffins	AHL	75	9	23	32	81	5	0	1	1	0
2018–19	Tucson Roadrunners	AHL	67	6	33	39	32	—	—	—	—	—
2019–20	Tucson Roadrunners	AHL	53	2	17	19	35	—	—	—	—	—
2020–21	San Jose Barracuda	AHL	34	2	13	15	14	4	0	1	1	0
2021–22	Utica Comets	AHL	70	3	32	35	21	4	2	2	4	6
2022–23	Utica Comets	AHL	72	6	22	28	20	6	0	4	4	0
2023–24	Utica Comets	AHL	69	4	26	30	53	—	—	—	—	—
2024–25	Tucson Roadrunners	AHL	72	4	30	34	33	3	0	1	1	0
2025–26	Tucson Roadrunners	AHL	59	5	12	17	22	—	—	—	—	—
NHL totals			19	0	0	0	2	—	—	—	—	—

=== International ===
Year	Team	Event	Result	GP	G	A	Pts	PIM
2010	United States	U17	1st place, gold medalist(s)	6	3	2	5	4
2011	United States	U18	1st place, gold medalist(s)	6	1	7	8	4
Junior totals				12	4	9	13	8

== Awards and honors ==
Award	Year
College
CCHA All-Rookie Team	2011–12
Hockey East First Team All-Star	2014–15
AHCA East Second-Team All-American	2014–15
CCM Hockey All-American	2014–15
Notre Dame Monogram Club Team MVP	2014–15
Nyrop Defensive Player of the Year	2014–15
AHL
All-Rookie Team	2015–16
Second All-Star Team	2015–16
Calder Cup champion	2016–17
