= Ryan Haggerty =

American professional ice hockey forward (born 1993)

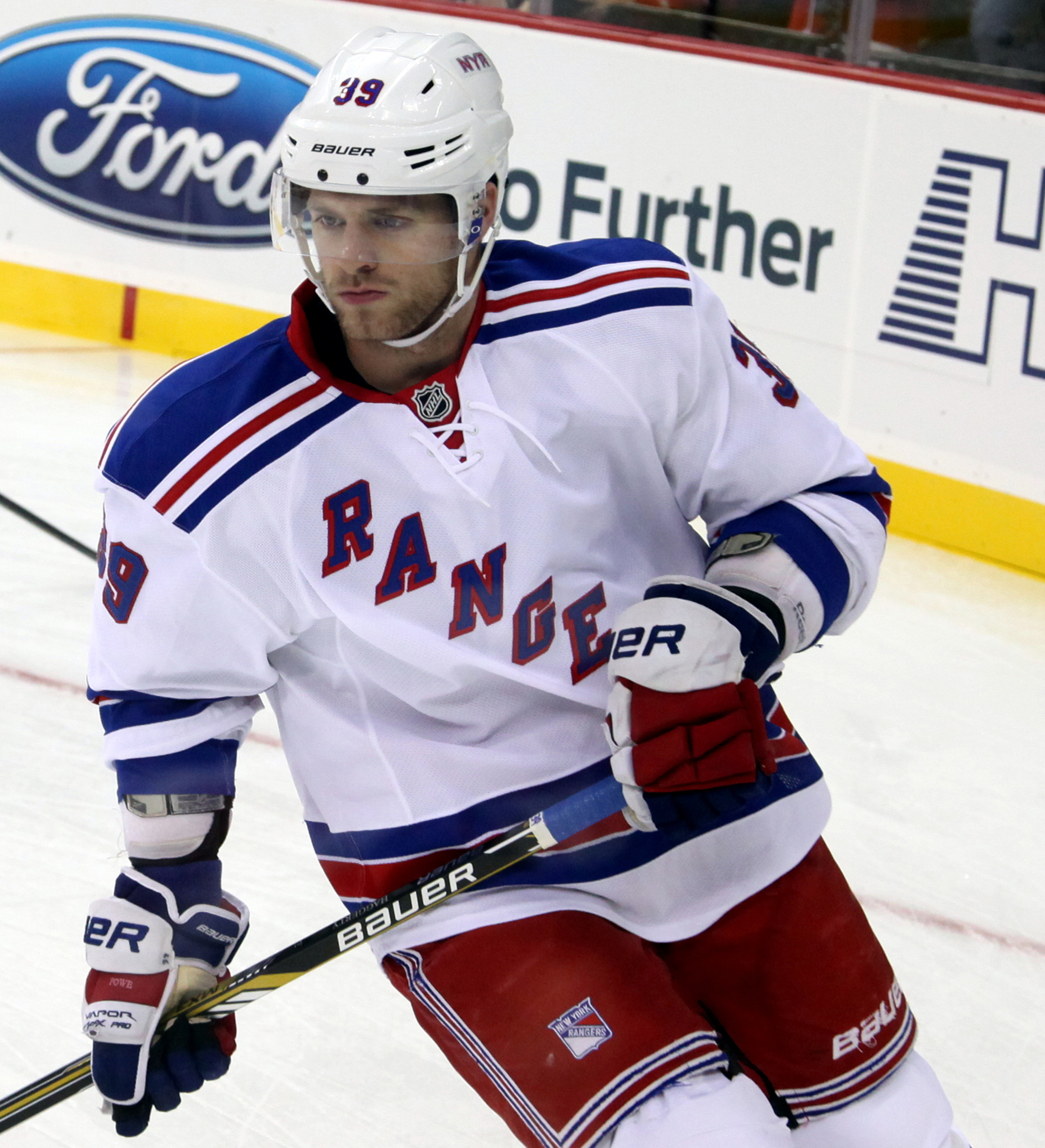
- Haggerty with the New York Rangers in 2014
- Born: March 4, 1993 (age 33) Stamford, Connecticut, U.S.
- Height: 6 ft 0 in (183 cm)
- Weight: 201 lb (91 kg; 14 st 5 lb)
- Position: Forward
- Shot: Right
- Played for: Hartford Wolf Pack; Rockford IceHogs; WBS Penguins; Springfield Thunderbirds
- NHL draft: Undrafted
- Playing career: 2014–2020

Ryan Haggerty (born March 4, 1993) is an American former professional ice hockey forward.

== Playing career ==
Haggerty played two seasons with the USA Hockey National Team Development Program and won a gold medal with Team USA at the 2011 IIHF World U18 Championships. Before turning professional, Haggerty attended the Rensselaer Polytechnic Institute where he played three seasons (2011–14) of NCAA Division I hockey with the RPI Engineers, registering 47 goals, 37 assists, 84 points, and 102 penalty minutes in 106 games.

On March 12, 2014, the New York Rangers of the NHL signed Haggerty as an undrafted free agent to an entry-level contract.

In his first professional season in 2014–15, Haggerty was assigned to AHL affiliate, the Hartford Wolf Pack. He contributed offensively among the Wolf Pack with 15 goals and 33 points in 76 games.

On the second day of the 2015 NHL entry draft, Haggerty was traded by the Rangers to the Chicago Blackhawks in exchange for Antti Raanta on June 27, 2015. In the following 2015–16 season, Haggerty was assigned to the Blackhawks AHL affiliate, the Rockford IceHogs for the duration of the campaign. Limited to just 36 games with the IceHogs due to injury, Haggerty registered 13 points before ending his contract with Chicago.

As a free agent in the off-season, Haggerty opted to continue in the AHL, signing a one-year deal with the Wilkes-Barre/Scranton Penguins, an affiliate of the Pittsburgh Penguins on September 8, 2016.

After recording a personal best year with the Penguins during the 2017–18 season, with 16 goals, 21 assists, and 36 points in 47 games, Haggerty re-signed for a third season with the Wilkes-Barre/Scranton on July 9, 2018. Before the 2018–19 NHL season, Haggerty was invited to the major league club for training camp. In two preseason games, he scored two goals and an assist. His excellent performance earned him an NHL contract; despite having already been cut from the training camp roster, Haggerty was awarded a two-year, two-way contract worth an NHL average of $675,000 per year.

During the 2019–20 season, on December 17, 2019, Haggerty was traded to the Florida Panthers in exchange for Kevin Roy.

== Personal life ==
Haggerty's father, Roger, played four years of minor-league baseball for the Boston Red Sox organization.

== Career statistics ==
=== Regular season and playoffs ===
			Regular season					Playoffs
Season	Team	League	GP	G	A	Pts	PIM	GP	G	A	Pts	PIM
2009–10	U.S. National Development Team	USHL	37	5	6	11	38	—	—	—	—	—
2010–11	U.S. National Development Team	USHL	23	7	8	15	9	—	—	—	—	—
2011–12	R.P.I.	ECAC	35	7	8	15	30	—	—	—	—	—
2012–13	R.P.I.	ECAC	36	12	14	26	30	—	—	—	—	—
2013–14	R.P.I.	ECAC	35	28	15	43	42	—	—	—	—	—
2014–15	Hartford Wolf Pack	AHL	76	15	18	33	34	14	2	4	6	4
2015–16	Rockford IceHogs	AHL	36	9	4	13	17	1	0	0	0	0
2016–17	Wilkes-Barre/Scranton Penguins	AHL	58	11	12	23	46	4	0	0	0	2
2017–18	Wilkes-Barre/Scranton Penguins	AHL	47	16	21	37	22	2	0	1	1	0
2018–19	Wilkes-Barre/Scranton Penguins	AHL	68	23	21	44	44	—	—	—	—	—
2019–20	Wilkes-Barre/Scranton Penguins	AHL	23	3	3	6	15	—	—	—	—	—
2019–20	Springfield Thunderbirds	AHL	27	5	3	8	18	—	—	—	—	—
AHL totals			335	82	82	164	196	21	2	5	7	6

=== International ===
Year	Team	Event	Result	GP	G	A	Pts	PIM
2010	United States	U17	1st place, gold medalist(s)	6	1	2	3	0
2011	United States	WJC18	1st place, gold medalist(s)	6	2	0	2	0
Junior totals				12	3	2	5	0

== Awards and honors ==
Award	Year
College
All-ECAC Hockey First Team	2013–14
AHCA East Second-Team All-American	2013–14
