= Don Biggs =

Canadian ice hockey player

- Born: April 7, 1965 (age 61) Mississauga, Ontario, Canada
- Height: 5 ft 8 in (173 cm)
- Weight: 180 lb (82 kg; 12 st 12 lb)
- Position: Centre
- Shot: Right
- Played for: Minnesota North Stars; Philadelphia Flyers
- NHL draft: 156th overall, 1983; Minnesota North Stars
- Playing career: 1985–1999; 2001–2002

Donald R. Biggs (born April 7, 1965) is a Canadian retired professional ice hockey player.

His son, Tyler Biggs, was a first round draft pick of the Toronto Maple Leafs.

== Early life ==
Biggs was raised in Mississauga, Ontario on Carrera Lane and attended Clarkson Secondary School.

== Playing career ==
As a youth, Biggs played in the 1978 Quebec International Pee-Wee Hockey Tournament with a minor ice hockey team from Mississauga.

Don Biggs was drafted from the OHL's Oshawa Generals by the Minnesota North Stars in the 1983 NHL entry draft. Biggs honed his pro game with their American Hockey League (AHL) team and was called up for one game with the North Stars. In 1985 Biggs' rights were traded to the Edmonton Oilers, but due to their talent-laden centre position with Wayne Gretzky and Mark Messier, Biggs at 20 years old, remained with their AHL affiliate in Nova Scotia. In 1987 Biggs signed with the Philadelphia Flyers and eventually played 12 games notching 2 goals.

While Biggs never managed to become a regular member of an NHL club, he was a valuable member and usually the captain of many minor league hockey teams in the OHL, AHL, IHL, ECHL, and a European professional hockey club. During his seasons with the Binghamton Rangers in 1992-93 Biggs set the AHL single-season scoring mark with 54 goals and 84 assists for 138 points. Biggs experienced his greatest success as Captain of the Cincinnati Cyclones from 1993–1999 and for a stint in 2002. During his time with the team he became a fan favorite and a local celebrity.

Biggs was also the on ice double for Patrick Swayze's skating scenes in the 1986 movie Youngblood.

== Life after hockey ==
Don Biggs lives in Loveland, Ohio not far from Cincinnati. Biggs' number 22 jersey was retired in his honor and hung from the rafters of the local arena. He works for a local electrical supply company and is involved in local hockey programs, where he runs elite, private and team skill clinics as well as youth hockey clinics. He was the head coach and general manager of the Queen City Steam in the Tier III junior hockey league, NA3HL from 2007 to 2013 when the team was sold and rebranded. He coached and mentored his son from squirt level in the local CAHA league to becoming the Captain of Team USA. (U17 & U18)

His son Tyler Biggs was taken 22nd overall in the 2011 NHL draft. Biggs last played professional hockey in spring 2019 for the Kalamazoo Wings of the ECHL.

== Career statistics ==
			Regular season					Playoffs
Season	Team	League	GP	G	A	Pts	PIM	GP	G	A	Pts	PIM
1982–83	Oshawa Generals	OHL	70	22	53	75	145	16	3	6	9	17
1982–83	Oshawa Generals	M-Cup	—	—	—	—	—	4	1	3	4	27
1983–84	Oshawa Generals	OHL	58	31	60	91	149	7	4	4	8	18
1983–84	Salt Lake Golden Eagles	CHL	—	—	—	—	—	3	0	0	0	2
1984–85	Oshawa Generals	OHL	60	48	69	117	105	5	3	4	7	6
1984–85	Minnesota North Stars	NHL	1	0	0	0	0	—	—	—	—	—
1984–85	Springfield Indians	AHL	6	0	3	3	0	2	1	0	1	0
1985–86	Springfield Indians	AHL	28	15	16	31	42	—	—	—	—	—
1985–86	Nova Scotia Oilers	AHL	47	6	23	29	36	—	—	—	—	—
1986–87	Nova Scotia Oilers	AHL	80	22	25	47	165	5	1	2	3	4
1987–88	Hershey Bears	AHL	77	38	41	79	151	12	5	11	16	22
1988–89	Hershey Bears	AHL	77	36	67	103	158	11	5	9	14	30
1989–90	Philadelphia Flyers	NHL	11	2	0	2	8	—	—	—	—	—
1989–90	Hershey Bears	AHL	66	39	53	92	125	—	—	—	—	—
1990–91	EHC Olten	NDA	8	1	5	6	16	—	—	—	—	—
1990–91	Rochester Americans	AHL	65	31	57	88	115	15	9	14	23	14
1991–92	Binghamton Rangers	AHL	74	32	50	82	122	11	3	7	10	8
1992–93	Binghamton Rangers	AHL	78	54	84	138	112	14	3	9	12	32
1993–94	Cincinnati Cyclones	IHL	80	30	59	89	128	11	8	9	17	29
1994–95	Cincinnati Cyclones	IHL	77	27	49	76	152	10	1	9	10	29
1995–96	Cincinnati Cyclones	IHL	82	27	57	84	160	17	9	10	19	24
1996–97	Cincinnati Cyclones	IHL	82	25	41	66	128	3	1	2	3	19
1997–98	Cincinnati Cyclones	IHL	82	25	52	77	88	9	5	4	9	27
1998–99	Utah Grizzlies	IHL	60	19	36	55	73	—	—	—	—	—
1998–99	Cincinnati Cyclones	IHL	23	3	17	20	33	—	—	—	—	—
2001–02	Cincinnati Cyclones	ECHL	32	10	22	32	41	3	1	0	1	14
AHL totals			598	273	419	692	1026	70	27	52	79	110
IHL totals			486	156	311	467	762	50	24	34	58	128
