= Dominik Daxlberger =

German professional ice hockey player

- Born: 7 February 1993 (age 32); Rosenheim, Germany
- Height: 1.77 m (5 ft 10 in)
- Weight: 74 kg (163 lb; 11 st 9 lb)
- Position: Forward
- Shoots: Left
- DEL team Former teams: Düsseldorfer EG; Starbulls Rosenheim
- Playing career: 2011–present

Dominik Daxlberger (born 7 February 1993 in Rosenheim) is a German professional ice hockey player. He currently plays for Starbulls Rosenheim in the DEL2 (German Ice Hockey League).
