= Kilian Keller =

German ice hockey player

- Born: March 15, 1993 (age 32); Füssen, Germany
- Height: 6 ft 3 in (191 cm)
- Weight: 187 lb (85 kg; 13 st 5 lb)
- Position: Defence
- Shoots: Left
- DEL2 team Former teams: Ravensburg Towerstars; EHC Wolfsburg
- Playing career: 2011–present

Kilian Keller (born March 15, 1993) is a German professional ice hockey defenceman. He is currently playing for the Ravensburg Towerstars of the DEL2. He joined the Towerstars after previously playing with EHC Wolfsburg in the Deutsche Eishockey Liga (DEL).

== Career statistics ==
			Regular season					Playoffs
Season	Team	League	GP	G	A	Pts	PIM	GP	G	A	Pts	PIM
2007–08	EV Füssen U18	Jugend-BL	7	1	0	1	8	—	—	—	—	—
2008–09	EV Füssen U18	Jugend-BL	30	10	22	32	38	6	1	2	3	8
2009–10	EV Füssen U18	Jugend-BL	26	14	21	35	36	6	2	3	5	6
2009–10	EV Füssen	Germany3	6	0	0	0	4	—	—	—	—	—
2010–11	EV Füssen U18	DNL	20	2	5	7	57	—	—	—	—	—
2010–11	EV Füssen	Germany3	36	1	8	9	28	4	0	1	1	14
2011–12	EV Füssen U18	DNL	4	0	3	3	14	—	—	—	—	—
2011–12	EV Füssen	Germany3	20	1	6	7	53	3	0	0	0	0
2012–13	Grizzly Adams Wolfsburg	DEL	12	0	0	0	0	—	—	—	—	—
2012–13	EV Füssen U18	DNL	4	0	4	4	6	—	—	—	—	—
2012–13	EV Füssen	Germany3	17	2	3	5	16	1	0	0	0	2
2013–14	Grizzly Adams Wolfsburg	DEL	50	0	2	2	6	9	0	1	1	0
2014–15	Grizzly Adams Wolfsburg	DEL	39	0	1	1	14	11	0	1	1	2
2015–16	Ravensburg Towerstars	DEL2	49	2	9	11	52	11	1	4	5	8
2016–17	Ravensburg Towerstars	DEL2	50	3	8	11	71	3	0	1	1	2
2017–18	Ravensburg Towerstars	DEL2	49	4	16	20	79	2	0	0	0	0
2018–19	Ravensburg Towerstars	DEL2	45	4	8	12	38	14	2	1	3	45
2019–20	Ravensburg Towerstars	DEL2	35	0	7	7	32	—	—	—	—	—
2020–21	Ravensburg Towerstars	DEL2	37	2	5	7	24	2	0	0	0	0
DEL totals			101	0	3	3	20	20	0	2	2	2
DEL2 totals			265	15	53	68	296	32	3	6	9	55
