= Peter Boltun =

Slovak ice hockey forward

- Born: February 1, 1993 (age 32); Michalovce, Slovakia
- Height: 6 ft 0 in (183 cm)
- Weight: 187 lb (85 kg; 13 st 5 lb)
- Position: Forward
- Shoots: Left
- Tipsport Liga team Former teams: HK Dukla Michalovce; HC Košice; HK Poprad
- Playing career: 2011–present

Peter Boltun (born January 2, 1993) is a Slovak professional ice hockey forward currently playing for HK Dukla Michalovce of the Tipsport Liga.

Boltun made his Tipsport Liga debut with HC Košice during the 2012–13 season. He later joined HK Poprad in 2014 for one season before returning to Košice. On May 30, 2019, Boltun signed with his hometown team HK Dukla Michalovce following their promotion to the Tipsport Liga.
