= Tomi Wilenius =

Finnish ice hockey player

- Born: January 15, 1993 (age 32); Nokia, Finland
- Height: 5 ft 9 in (175 cm)
- Weight: 172 lb (78 kg; 12 st 4 lb)
- Position: Centre
- Shoots: Right
- AlpsHL team Former teams: EK Zell am See; Ilves
- Playing career: 2012–present

Tomi Wilenius (born January 15, 1993) is a Finnish professional ice hockey player currently on playing with EK Zell am See of the Alps Hockey League.

Wilenius originally made his Finnish Liiga debut playing with Ilves during the 2011–12 SM-liiga season. On July 28, 2014, Wilenius as a free agent agreed to a try-out contract with Austrian club, Graz 99ers of the Erste Bank Eishockey Liga. Upon completion of his trial, Wilenius was unable to debut with Graz and returned to Finland on a one-year contract in the Mestis with Hokki on October 8, 2014.
