= Samu Perhonen =

Finnish ice hockey player

- Born: March 7, 1993 (age 33) Jämsänkoski, Finland
- Height: 6 ft 5 in (196 cm)
- Weight: 196 lb (89 kg; 14 st 0 lb)
- Position: Goaltender
- Catches: Left
- Ligue Magnus team Former teams: Boxers de Bordeaux; JYP; Indiana Ice; HIFK; KalPa; HPK; KooKoo; SaPKo; Odense Bulldogs; Östersunds IK
- NHL draft: 62nd overall, 2011; Edmonton Oilers
- Playing career: 2011–present

Samu Perhonen (born March 7, 1993) is a Finnish ice hockey goaltender. His is currently playing with Boxers de Bordeaux in the French Ligue Magnus. Perhonen was selected by the Edmonton Oilers in the 3rd round (62nd overall) of the 2011 NHL entry draft.

Perhonen made his Liiga debut playing with HIFK during the 2013–14 Liiga season.
