= Albert Yarullin =

Russian ice hockey player

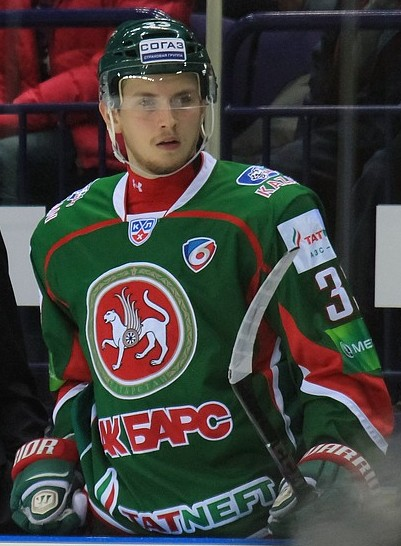
- Born: May 3, 1993 (age 33) Kazan, Russia
- Height: 6 ft 0 in (183 cm)
- Weight: 209 lb (95 kg; 14 st 13 lb)
- Position: Defence
- Shoots: Right
- KHL team Former teams: Ak Bars Kazan; Neftekhimik Nizhnekamsk; Atlant Moscow Oblast; Traktor Chelyabinsk
- Playing career: 2011–present

Albert Yarullin (Tatar: Әлбирт Яруллин; born May 12, 1993) is a Russian professional ice hockey defenceman who is currently playing under contract with Ak Bars Kazan of the Kontinental Hockey League (KHL).

== Playing career ==
Yarullin originally played with Ak Bars Kazan in the KHL during the 2011–12 season.

Yarullin spent parts of two seasons with HC Neftekhimik Nizhnekamsk and Atlant Moscow Oblast before returning to Ak Bars in a trade prior to the 2015–16 season on June 3, 2015.

Following his ninth season in the KHL with Ak Bars in 2020–21, Yarullin left the club as a free agent to sign a three-year contract with Traktor Chelyabinsk on 13 May 2021.

Yarullin played three seasons with Traktor Chelyabinsk, before leaving at the conclusion of the 2023–24 season to return to his original club, Ak Bars Kazan, on a three-year contract on 17 June 2024.

== Awards and honours ==
Award	Year
KHL
Gagarin Cup (Ak Bars Kazan)	2018
