= Tomáš Rousek =

Czech ice hockey player (born 1993)

- Born: September 9, 1993 (age 32) České Budějovice, Czech Republic
- Height: 5 ft 10 in (178 cm)
- Weight: 176 lb (80 kg; 12 st 8 lb)
- Position: Forward
- Shoots: Left
- Regionalliga team Former teams: EHC Waldkraiburg; Mountfield HK
- Playing career: 2011–present

Tomáš Rousek (born September 9, 1993) is a Czech professional ice hockey player. He is currently playing for EHC Waldkraiburg who currently compete in Regionalliga.

Rousek made his Czech Extraliga debut playing with Motor České Budějovice during the 2011-12 Czech Extraliga season. He also played for Mountfield HK.
