= Filip Vaško =

Slovak footballer

Personal information
- Full name: Filip Vaško
- Date of birth: 11 August 1999 (age 27)
- Place of birth: Rožňava, Slovakia
- Height: 1.91 m (6 ft 3 in)
- Position: Centre-back

Team information
- Current team: Slovácko
- Number: 5

Youth career
- –2012: Rožňava
- 2012–2016: VSS Košice
- 2016–2020: Udinese

Senior career*
| Years | Team | Apps | (Gls) |
| 2017–2020 | Udinese | 0 | (0) |
| 2020–2024 | Zemplín Michalovce | 103 | (3) |
| 2024– | Slovácko | 50 | (0) |

International career^{‡}
| 2015–2016 | Slovakia U17 | 5 | (1) |
| 2017 | Slovakia U18 | 5 | (0) |
| 2018 | Slovakia U20 | 1 | (0) |
- * Club domestic league appearances and goals as of 25 May 2026 ‡ National team caps and goals as of 13 November 2017

Filip Vaško (born 11 August 1999) is a Slovak professional footballer who currently plays for Czech First League club Slovácko as a defender.

== Club career ==
=== Zemplín Michalovce ===
Vaško made his Fortuna Liga debut for Zemplín Michalovce against AS Trenčín on 12 September 2020.

=== Slovácko ===
On 10 July 2024, Vaško signed a contract with Slovácko until summer 2027.
