= Marek Hrbas =

Czech ice hockey player

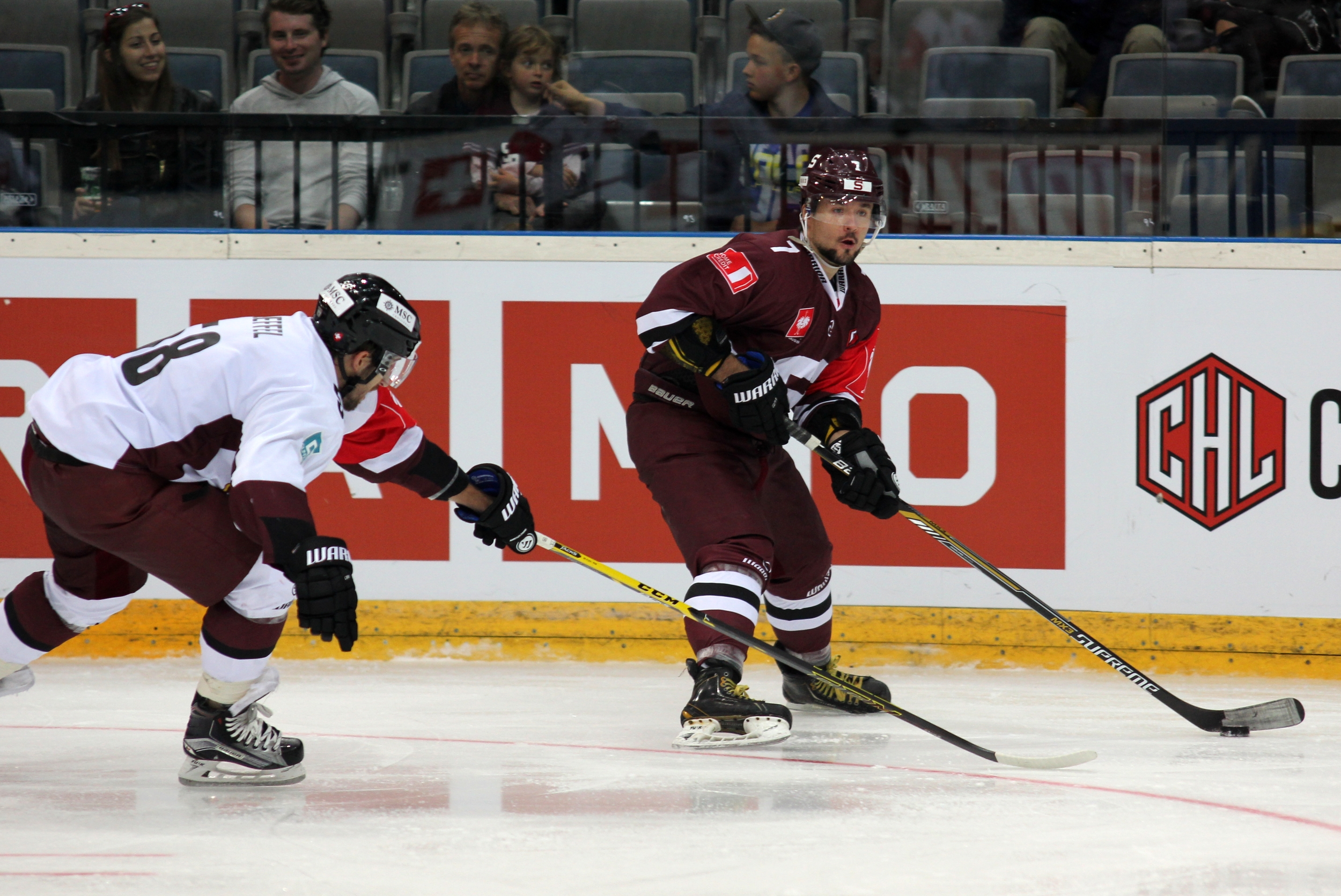
- Born: March 4, 1993 (age 32); Klatovy, Czech Republic
- Height: 6 ft 0 in (183 cm)
- Weight: 194 lb (88 kg; 13 st 12 lb)
- Position: Defense
- Shoots: Left
- Czech team Former teams: HC Verva Litvínov; HC Plzeň; Fargo Force; Edmonton Oil Kings; Kamloops Blazers; HC Sparta Praha; HC Stadion Litoměřice; HC Vítkovice; Amur Khabarovsk
- NHL draft: Undrafted
- Playing career: 2009–present

Marek Hrbas (born March 4, 1993) is a Czech professional ice hockey defenceman for HC Oceláři Třinec of the Czech Extraliga (ELH).

== Playing career ==
Hrbas played as a youth in his native Czech Republic within HC Plzeň before embarking on a major junior career in North America, playing in the United States Hockey League with the Fargo Force before joining the Western Hockey League (WHL) with the Edmonton Oil Kings in the 2010–11 season and later playing two seasons with the Kamloops Blazers.

Hrbas made his Czech Extraliga debut playing with HC Sparta Praha during the 2013–14 Czech Extraliga season.

During the 2018-19 season, with Hrbas playing in his sixth year in the Czech Extraliga, he appeared in 22 games with HC Vítkovice for 4 points. At the mid-point of the campaign, Hrbas left the ELH, opting to join Russian club, Amur Khabarovsk of the KHL, for the remainder of the season on December 5, 2018.

== Career statistics ==
=== Regular season and playoffs ===
			Regular season					Playoffs
Season	Team	League	GP	G	A	Pts	PIM	GP	G	A	Pts	PIM

=== International ===
Year	Team	Event	Result	GP	G	A	Pts	PIM
