= Aleksi Salonen =

Finnish ice hockey player

- Born: February 3, 1993 (age 32) Muurame, Finland
- Height: 5 ft 10 in (178 cm)
- Weight: 179 lb (81 kg; 12 st 11 lb)
- Position: Defence
- Shoots: Right
- Maxa liga team Former teams: Ri okna Berani Zlín; JYP Jyväskylä; Tappara; Jukurit; TPS Graz
- Playing career: 2011–present

Aleksi Salonen (born February 3, 1993) is a Finnish professional ice hockey defenceman. He is currently playing for Graz99ers of the ICE Hockey League (ICEHL).

Salonen made his SM-liiga debut playing with JYP Jyväskylä during the 2012–13 SM-liiga season.

Following his tenth season in the Finnish Liiga, Salonen signed his first contract abroad in agreeing to a one-year deal with Austrian club, Graz99ers of the ICE Hockey League, on 21 July 2022.
