= Luca Boltshauser =

Swiss professional ice hockey goaltender

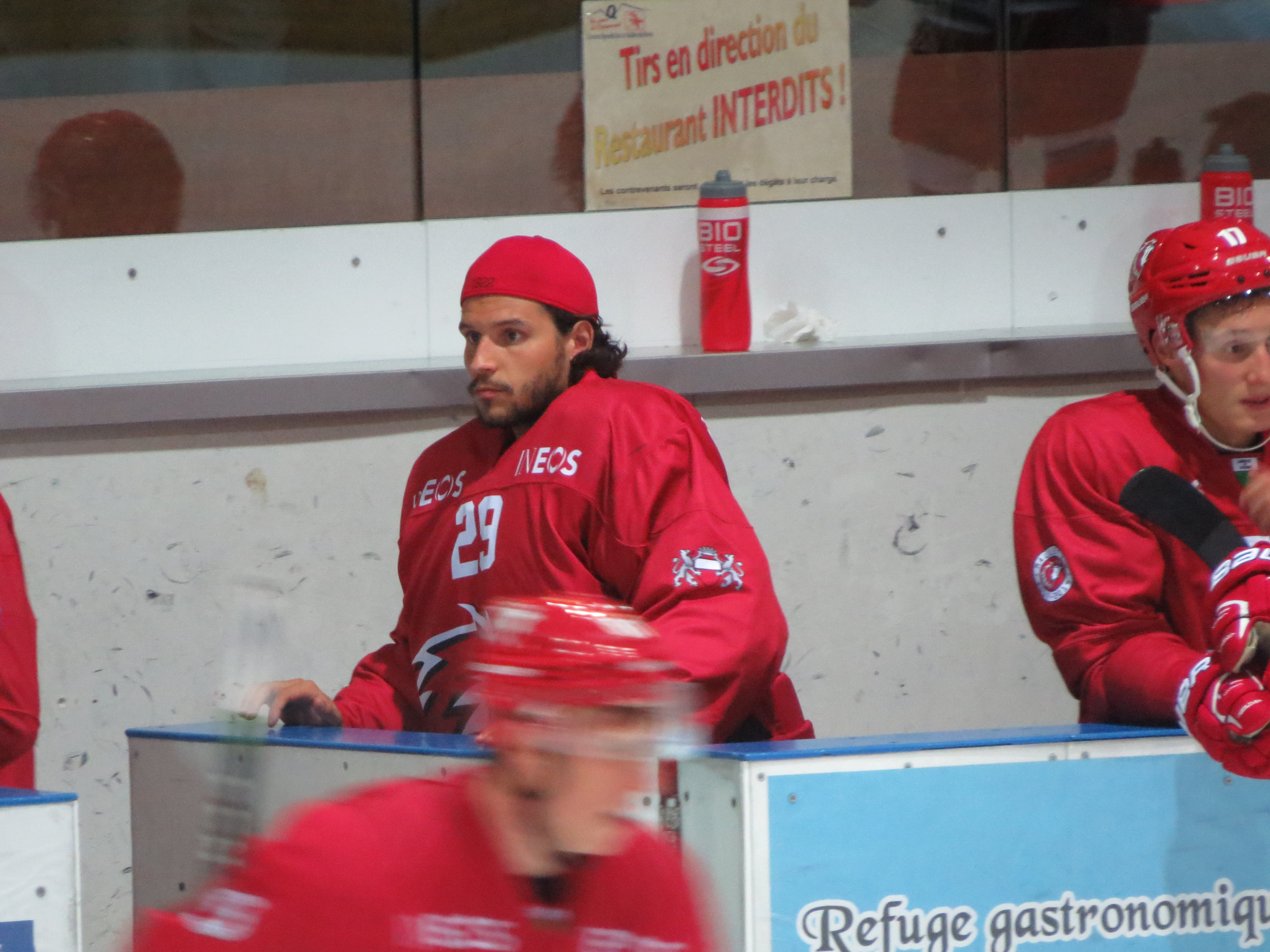
- Born: 17 July 1993 (age 32); Zurich, Switzerland
- Height: 6 ft 0 in (183 cm)
- Weight: 176 lb (80 kg; 12 st 8 lb)
- Position: Goaltender
- Catches: Left
- NL team Former teams: SCL Tigers; VIK Västerås HK; ZSC Lions; EHC Kloten; Lausanne HC
- Playing career: 2011–present

Luca Boltshauser (born 17 July 1993) is a Swiss professional ice hockey goaltender who currently plays for SCL Tigers in the National League (NL).

== Playing career ==
Boltshauser was originally part of the ZSC Lions organization as a junior before signing in the Swedish Hockey League with Färjestads BK. Boltshauser played in the J20 SuperElit competition for Färjestads, however never made his SHL debut. He was loaned to HockeyAllsvenskan club, VIK Västerås HK, before returning to the ZSC Lions for the 2014–15 season.

On 3 February 2015 it was confirmed that Boltshauser would join his second NLA club, the Kloten Flyers, on a one-year deal.

Following a year in which Kloten were relegated to the Swiss League, Boltshauser joined Lausanne HC on a two-year contract starting in the 2018–19 season.
