= Kalle Johansson (ice hockey) =

Swedish ice hockey player

- Born: January 21, 1993 (age 32) Östersund, Sweden
- Height: 5 ft 9 in (175 cm)
- Weight: 168 lb (76 kg; 12 st 0 lb)
- Position: Defence
- Shoots: Left
- Allsv team Former teams: IF Björklöven; Växjö Lakers; Graz99ers
- Playing career: 2007–present

Kalle Johansson (born January 21, 1993) is a Swedish professional ice hockey player who is currently playing for IF Björklöven in the HockeyAllsvenskan (Allsv).

== Career ==
Johansson made his Swedish Hockey League debut in the 2018–19 season with the Växjö Lakers. After 18 games, posting three assists, and a loan to IK Oskarshamn of the HockeyAllsvenskan, Johansson left Sweden during the midpoint of the year, joining the Graz 99ers of the EBEL for the remainder of the season.

== Awards and honours ==
- 2011 IIHF World U18 Championships (Silver Medal with Team Sweden)
