= Niko Kallela =

Finnish ice hockey player

- Born: July 2, 1991 (age 33); Tampere, Finland
- Height: 5 ft 11 in (180 cm)
- Weight: 174 lb (79 kg; 12 st 6 lb)
- Position: Forward
- Shoots: Right
- SM-liiga team: KalPa
- NHL draft: Undrafted
- Playing career: 2011–present

Niko Kallela (born July 2, 1991) is a Finnish professional ice hockey player who is currently playing for KalPa in the SM-liiga.

== See also ==
- Ice hockey in Finland
