= Sergei Smurov =

Russian ice hockey player

- Born: July 26, 1993 (age 31); Khabarovsk, Russia
- Height: 5 ft 11 in (180 cm)
- Weight: 170 lb (77 kg; 12 st 2 lb)
- Position: Forward
- Shoots: Left
- KHL team: Amur Khabarovsk
- NHL draft: Undrafted
- Playing career: 2012–present

Sergei Smurov (born July 26, 1993) is a Russian professional ice hockey player. He is currently playing with Amur Khabarovsk of the Kontinental Hockey League (KHL).

Smurov made his Kontinental Hockey League debut playing with Amur Khabarovsk during the 2012–13 season.
