= Roman Konkov =

Russian ice hockey player

- Born: March 4, 1993 (age 32); Nizhny Novgorod, Russia
- Height: 5 ft 10 in (178 cm)
- Weight: 205 lb (93 kg; 14 st 9 lb)
- Position: Forward
- Shoots: Left
- team Former teams: Free agent Torpedo Nizhny Novgorod
- Playing career: 2011–present

Roman Konkov (born March 4, 1993) is a Russian professional ice hockey player. He is currently a free agent having last played with SKHL Crvena zvezda of the International Hockey League (IntHL).

Konkov previously played for Torpedo Nizhny Novgorod of the Kontinental Hockey League and made his debut for the team on September 27, 2011 during the 2011–12 KHL season. He remained a member of the team until 2016 but was never able to fully establish his place on the main roster as he spent the majority of his spell playing in the second-tier Supreme Hockey League. He played a total of 41 games for Torpedo Nizhny Novgorod.
