= Ville Järveläinen =

Finnish ice hockey player (born 1993)

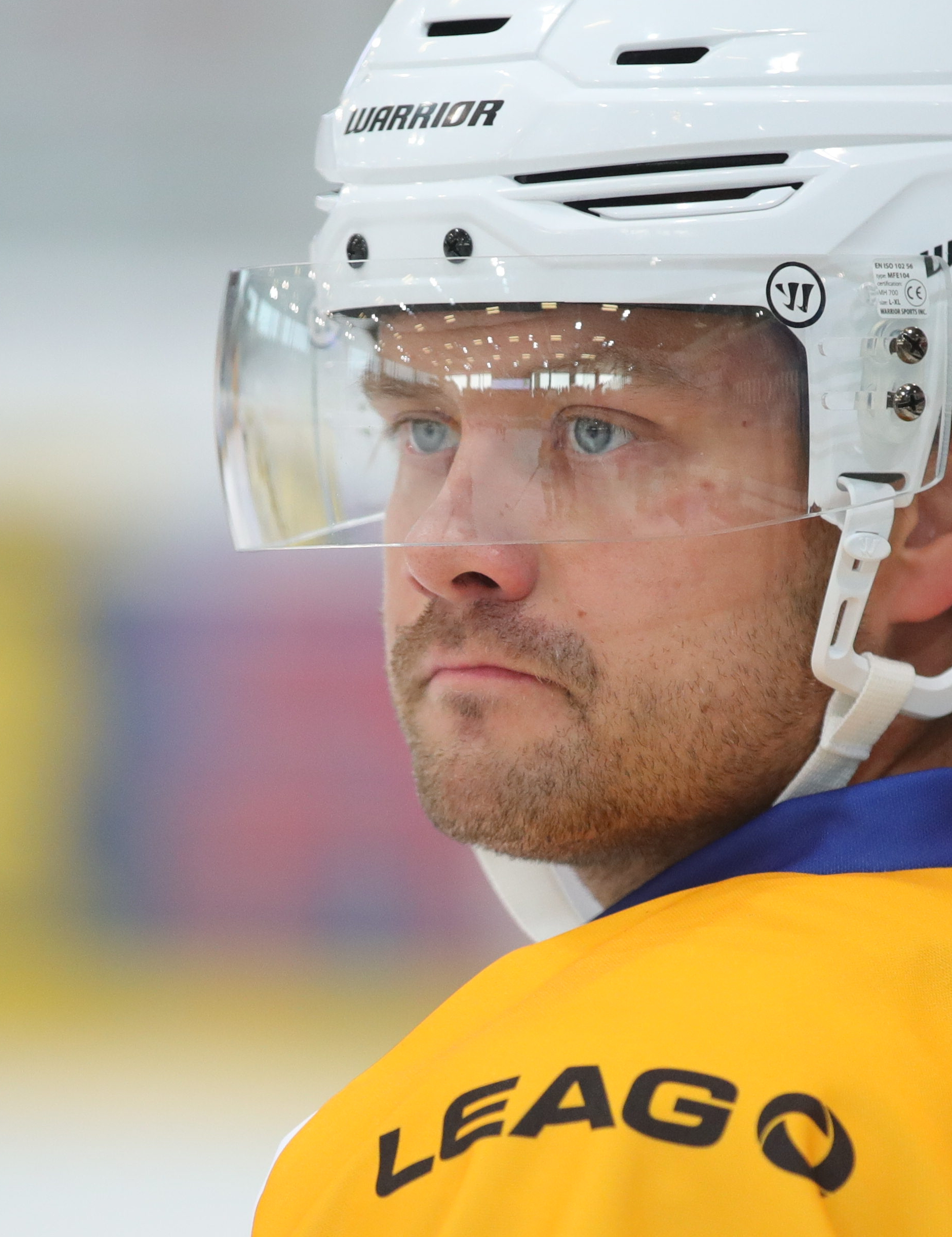
- Ville Järveläinen, 2023
- Born: February 24, 1993 (age 32); Hämeenlinna, Finland
- Height: 5 ft 5 in (165 cm)
- Weight: 150 lb (68 kg; 10 st 10 lb)
- Position: Forward
- Shoots: Right
- DEL2 team Former teams: Starbulls Rosenheim; Green Bay Gamblers; Peliitat Heinola; HPK; SaPKo; SaiPa; Heilbronner Falken; Gentofte Stars; EHC Bayreuth; Lausitzer Füchse
- NHL draft: Undrafted
- Playing career: 2011–present

Ville Järveläinen (born February 24, 1993) is a Finnish professional ice hockey player who also has the German citizenship. He is currently playing for Starbulls Rosenheim of the German DEL2.

Järveläinen made his debut in the Finnish Liiga playing with HPK during the 2012–13 Liiga season. Järveläinen represented Finland at U20 level.
