= Toni Kallela =

Finnish ice hockey player

- Born: January 10, 1993 (age 32); Oulainen, Finland
- Height: 5 ft 10 in (178 cm)
- Weight: 174 lb (79 kg; 12 st 6 lb)
- Position: Right wing
- Shot: Left
- Played for: KalPa; Mora IK; Ässät; Skellefteå AIK
- NHL draft: Undrafted
- Playing career: 2012–2020

Toni Kallela (born January 10, 1993) is a Finnish former professional ice hockey Right wing.

Kallela made his SM-liiga debut playing with KalPa during the 2011–12 SM-liiga season. On May 20, 2013, Kallela returned from a short stint in the Swedish HockeyAllsvenskan with Mora IK, to the Finnish Liiga in signing a two-year contract with Tappara.
