= Richard Ullberg =

Finnish ice hockey player

- Born: July 16, 1993 (age 31); Sipoo, Finland
- Height: 6 ft 3 in (191 cm)
- Weight: 185 lb (84 kg; 13 st 3 lb)
- Position: Goaltender
- Catches: Left
- EPIHL team Former teams: Guildford Flames; SaiPa
- NHL draft: Undrafted
- Playing career: 2011–present

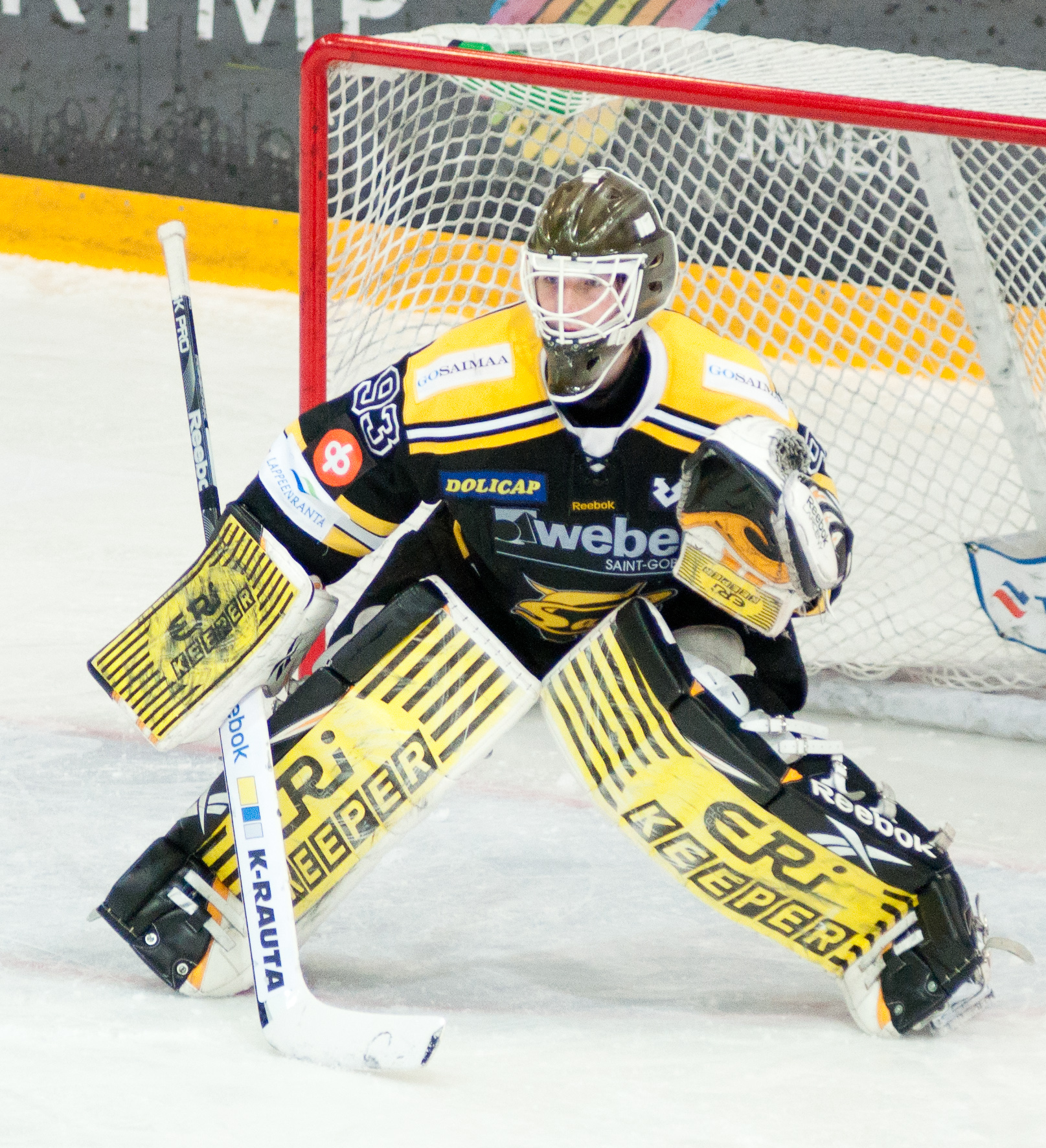
Finnish ice hockey goaltender Richard Ullberg playing for SaiPa Lappeenranta in Lappeenranta, Finland

Richard Ullberg (born July 16, 1993) is a Finnish ice hockey goaltender. He is currently playing with Guildford Flames of the English Premier Ice Hockey League (EPIHL).

Ullberg made his Liiga debut playing with SaiPa during the 2011–12 SM-liiga season.
