= 2013 World Junior Ice Hockey Championships =

U20 ice hockey tournament in Ufa, Russia

2013 IIHF U20 World Championship

Tournament details
- Host country: Russia
- City: Ufa
- Venue(s): Ufa Arena and Ice Palace Salavat Yulaev (in 1 host city)
- Dates: December 26, 2012 – January 5, 2013
- Teams: 10

Final positions
- Champions: United States (3rd title)
- Runners-up: Sweden
- Third place: Russia
- Fourth place: Canada

Tournament statistics
- Games played: 31
- Goals scored: 220 (7.1 per game)
- Attendance: 110,175 (3,554 per game)
- Scoring leader: (Canada) Ryan Nugent-Hopkins (15 points)

Awards
- MVP: (United States) John Gibson

Official website
- 2013 World Juniors

The 2013 IIHF World U20 Championship (commonly known as the 2013 World Junior Ice Hockey Championships) was the 37th edition of the Ice Hockey World Junior Championship (WJC). It was hosted in Ufa, Russia. It began on December 26, 2012, and ended with the gold medal game played on January 5, 2013. The United States win their third title, after defeated Sweden 3–1 in the final. It's their first one since 2010. American goalie John Gibson was named MVP of the tournament.

Russia defeated Canada 6–5 in overtime to win the bronze medal, sending the Canadians home without a medal for the first time since 1998. Latvia was relegated to Division I and Norway was promoted to the 2014 World Junior Ice Hockey Championships.

== Venues ==
Ufa Arena Capacity: 8,250	Ufa is located in European Russia	Ice Palace Salavat Yulaev Capacity: 4,043
Russia – Ufa	Ufa is located in European Russia	Russia – Ufa

== Match officials ==
The IIHF selected 12 referees and 10 linesmen to work the 2013 IIHF Ice Hockey U20 World Championship
They were the following:

Referees

- (United States) Harry Dumas
- (Russia) Roman Gofman
- (Czech Republic) Pavel Hodek
- (Germany) Georg Jablukov
- (Russia) Sergei Kulakov
- (Finland) Jari Levonen
- (Switzerland) Didier Massy
- (Sweden) Mikael Nord
- (United States) Steve Patafie
- (Sweden) Mikael Sjöqvist
- (Canada) Pat Smith
- (Switzerland) Daniel Sticker

Linesmen

- (Canada) François Dussureault
- (United States) Tommy George
- (Sweden) Tobias Haster
- (Latvia) Raivis Jučers
- (Switzerland) Roman Kaderli
- (Finland) Masi Puolakka
- (Russia) Stanislav Raming
- (Estonia) Anton Semjonov
- (Russia) Dmitry Sivov
- (Slovakia) Peter Stano

== Top Division ==
Each round will be a round-robin tournament, where the teams play each other once within their group. The Preliminary round is divided into two groups: Group A and Group B, which includes five teams each. From each group, the top three teams will qualify for the playoffs; the 1st-ranked teams earn a direct trip to the Semifinals, while the 2nd and 3rd-ranked teams qualify for the Quarterfinals. The 4th and 5th-ranked teams have to play in the Relegation round, where the three best teams qualify for the Top Division tournament the following year, with the last-placed team being relegated to the Division I tournament the following year. In the Semifinals, the directly qualified Semifinalists face the winners from the Quarterfinals.

=== Preliminary round ===
==== Group A ====
Pos	Team	Pld	W	OTW	OTL	L	GF	GA	GD	Pts	Qualification
1	Sweden	4	3	1	0	0	19	8	+11	11	Semifinals
2	Czech Republic	4	2	1	0	1	12	10	+2	8	Quarterfinals
3	Switzerland	4	1	0	3	0	16	14	+2	6	Quarterfinals
4	Finland	4	1	1	0	2	15	15	0	5	Relegation round
5	Latvia	4	0	0	0	4	6	21	−15	0	Relegation round

Source: IIHF

All times are local (Yekaterinburg Time – UTC+6).

December 26, 2012; 13:30	Latvia	1–5 (1–3, 0–2, 0–0)	Finland	Ice Palace Salavat Yulaev; Attendance: 1,457

Game reference

Elvis Merzļikins
Goalies
Joonas Korpisalo
Referees:
(Czech Republic) Pavel Hodek
(Sweden) Mikael Sjöqvist
Linesmen:
(Canada) François Dussureault
(Slovakia) Peter Stano

	0–1	1:54 – A. Lehkonen (V. Pokka)
N. Jeļisejevs (A. Kuzmenkovs) – 8:25	1–1
	1–2	12:23 – M. Aaltonen (R. Ristolainen)
	1–3	15:27 – M. Aaltonen (J. Armia) (PP)
	1–4	33:02 – M. Granlund (J. Armia) (PP)
	1–5	39:18 – R. Ristolainen (M. Aaltonen)

16 min
Penalties
16 min
12
Shots
44

December 26, 2012; 18:00	Czech Republic	1–4 (0–2, 0–1, 1–1)	Sweden	Ice Palace Salavat Yulaev; Attendance: 1,921

Game reference

Matěj Machovský
Goalies
Joel Lassinantti
Referees:
(Germany) Georgij Jablukov
(Russia) Roman Gofman
Linesmen:
(Russia) Stanislav Raming
(Russia) Dmitry Sivov

	0–1	02:16 – S. Collberg (E. Molin, M. Vikstrand) (PP2)
	0–2	03:48 – E. Lindholm (M. Vikstrand, V. Rask) (PP)
	0–3	23:03 – F. Sandberg (SH)
	0–4	52:07 – F. Forsberg (E. Djuse, R. Rakell)
L. Sedlák (J. Vrána) – 59:54	1–4

16 min
Penalties
20 min
26
Shots
41

December 27, 2012; 18:00	Switzerland	7–2 (2–1, 3–1, 2–0)	Latvia	Ice Palace Salavat Yulaev; Attendance: 1,135

Game reference

Luca Boltshauser
Goalies
Elvis Merzļikins
Ivars Punnenovs
Referees:
(Finland) Jari Levonen
(Sweden) Mikael Nord
Linesmen:
(United States) Tommy George
(Russia) Stanislav Raming

	0–1	02:45 – N. Jeļisejevs (E. Siksna, A. Kuzmenkovs) (PP)
C. Bertschy (A. Bertaggia, M. Müller) – 14:14	1–1
M. Künzle (T. Richard, L. Martschini) – 18:27	2–1
L. Balmelli (D. Simon, L. Martschini) – 21:07	3–1
	3–2	23:36 – A. Ševčenko (E. Siksna, E. Kurmis)
S. Andrighetto (T. Richard) (SH) – 31:39	4–2
S. Zangger (M. Müller) – 34:08	5–2
M. Künzle (T. Richard, S. Andrighetto) (PP) – 53:04	6–2
A. Bertaggia (S. Zangger, P. Baltisberger) – 57:33	7–2

12 min
Penalties
10 min
39
Shots
23

December 28, 2012; 13:30	Finland	1–3 (0–2, 1–0, 0–1)	Czech Republic	Ice Palace Salavat Yulaev; Attendance: 2,543

Game reference

Joonas Korpisalo
Goalies
Patrik Bartošák
Referees:
(United States) Harry Dumas
(United States) Steve Patafie
Linesmen:
(Canada) François Dussureault
(Russia) Dmitry Sivov

	0–1	14:17 – T. Hyka (T. Pavelka)
	0–2	16:34 – M. Hrbas (P. Šidlík, M. Frk) (PP)
T. Teräväinen (V. Pokka, P. Lindbohm) – 22:29	1–2
	1–3	59:56 – D. Jaškin (T. Hertl) (ENG)

8 min
Penalties
12 min
30
Shots
21

December 28, 2012; 18:00	Sweden	3–2 GWS (0–1, 1–1, 1–0) (OT: 0–0) (SO: 1–0)	Switzerland	Ice Palace Salavat Yulaev; Attendance: 2,359

Game reference

Joel Lassinantti
Niklas Lundström
Goalies
Melvin Nyffeler
Referees:
(Russia) Roman Gofman
(Germany) Georgji Jablukov
Linesmen:
(United States) Tommy George
(Slovakia) Peter Stano

	0–1	E. Antonietti (L. Martschini) – 14:04
S. Collberg (M. Vikstrand, E. Molin) (PP) – 30:32	1–1
	1–2	M. Künzle (S. Andrighetto, L. Martschini) (PP)
E. Djuse (R. Rakell) – 46:14	2–2

M. Vikstrand (miss)
S. Collberg (miss)
V. Rask
Shootout
(miss) C. Bertschy
(miss) S. Andrighetto
(miss) L. Martschini
4 min
Penalties
10 min
39
Shots
31

December 29, 2012; 18:00	Latvia	1–5 (0–1, 1–1, 0–3)	Sweden	Ice Palace Salavat Yulaev; Attendance: 1,856

Game reference

Ivars Punnenovs
Goalies
Niklas Lundström
Referees:
(Switzerland) Didier Massy
(Switzerland) Daniel Stricker
Linesmen:
(Canada) François Dussureault
(Russia) Stanislav Raming

	0–1	19:10 – E. Molin (E. Lindholm, S. Collberg) (PP)
T. Bļugers (E. Siksna, K. Lipsbergs) (PP2) – 23:50	1–1
	1–2	36:18 – S. Collberg (E. Molin)
	1–3	49:21 – V. Arvidsson (F. Forsberg, R. Rakell)
	1–4	51:49 – V. Arvidsson (C. Djoos, F. Forsberg) (PP)
	1–5	59:13 – A. Wennberg

30 min
Penalties
22 min
21
Shots
46

December 30, 2012; 13:30	Finland	5–4 GWS (0–2, 2–0, 2–2) (OT: 0–0) (SO: 1–0)	Switzerland	Ice Palace Salavat Yulaev; Attendance: 2,354

Game reference

Joonas Korpisalo
Goalies
Melvin Nyffeler
Referees:
(Russia) Sergei Kulakov
(Canada) Pat Smith
Linesmen:
(Russia) Dmitry Sivov
(Slovakia) Peter Stano

	0–1	13:01 – L. Martschini (D. Simion, D. Kukan)
	0–2	14:02 – S. Andrighetto (T. Richard, M. Künzle)
M. Granlund (J. Vainio, M. Salomäki) – 25:21	1–2
T. Teräväinen (A. Barkov, M. Salomäki) (PP) – 30:59	2–2
	2–3	41:08 – A. Bertaggia
	2–4	51:30 – D. Simion (C. Bertschy, S. Zangger (PP)
T. Teräväinen (M. Salomäki, R. Ristolainen) (PP) – 53:06	3–4
M. Granlund (J. Armia) – 58:20	4–4

M. Granlund (miss)
J. Armia (miss)
T. Teräväinen (miss)
V. Järveläinen (miss)
M. Granlund
Shootout
(miss) L. Martschini
(miss) A. Bertaggia
(miss) C. Bertschy
(miss) T. Richard
(miss) S. Andrighetto
10 min
Penalties
24 min
57
Shots
23

December 30, 2012; 18:00	Czech Republic	4–2 (1–1, 1–0, 2–1)	Latvia	Ice Palace Salavat Yulaev; Attendance: 1,756

Game reference

Patrik Bartošák
Goalies
Ivars Punnenovs
Referees:
(Russia) Roman Gofman
(Germany) Georgij Jablukov
Linesmen:
(United States) Tommy George
(Sweden) Tobias Haster

P. Beránek (J. Štencel) – 9:55	1–0
	1–1	18:33 – Ņ. Jevpalovs (T. Andersons) (PP)
M. Frk (P. Šidlík, R. Faksa) (PP) – 22:01	2–1
	2–2	41:59 – R. Lipsbergs (K. Lipsbergs, E. Kulda)
D. Jaškin (L. Selák, T. Hertl) – 53:46	3–2
M. Frk (P. Sidlik) (PP) – 59:33	4–2

12 min
Penalties
16 min
40
Shots
20

December 31, 2012; 13:30	Switzerland	3–4 OT (1–1, 0–2, 2–0) (OT: 0–1)	Czech Republic	Ice Palace Salavat Yulaev; Attendance: 1,754

Game reference

Melvin Nyffeler
Goalies
Patrik Bartošák
Referees:
(Finland) Jari Levonen
(United States) Steve Patafie
Linesmen:
(Sweden) Tobias Haster
(Russia) Dmitry Sivov

	0–1	03:46 – M. Beran (M. Švihálek)
C. Marti (L. Balmelli, M. Ness) – 14:20	1–1
	1–2	23:58 – M. Švihálek (D. Jaškin, P. Šidlík)
	1–3	26:46 – T. Hyka (R. Faksa, D. Jaškin)
C. Bertschy (A. Bertaggia, S. Andrighetto) (PP) – 51:45	2–3
D. Simion (S. Guerra, C. Marti) (PP) – 57:59	3–3
	3–4	61:39 – T. Hertl (D. Jaškin)

6 min
Penalties
10 min
29
Shots
31

December 31, 2012; 18:00	Sweden	7–4 (3–1, 2–2, 2–1)	Finland	Ice Palace Salavat Yulaev; Attendance: 1,543

Game reference

Joel Lassinantti
Niklas Lundström
Goalies
Joonas Korpisalo
Referees:
(Russia) Roman Gofman
(Canada) Pat Smith
Linesmen:
(Canada) François Dussureault
(Estonia) Anton Semjonov

A. Wennberg (C. Djoos, W. Karlsson) (PP) – 6:16	1–0
R. Hägg (A. Wennberg, J. Boyce-Rotevall) – 6:59	2–0
V. Rask (M. Vikstrand, S. Collberg) (PP) – 13:42	3–0
	3–1	16:17 – J. Armia (A. Barkov, J. Riikola) (PP)
	3–2	21:26 – R. Ristolainen (A. Barkov, T. Nykopp) (PP)
	3–3	23:55 – J. Armia (T. Teräväinen, M. Granlund) (PP2)
V. Arvidsson (R. Rakell, T. Nilsson) – 36:03	4–3
F. Forsberg (V. Arvidsson, C. Djoos) (PP) – 36:47	5–3
	5–4	50:40 – V. Järveläinen (T. Nykopp)
E. Molin (T. Nilsson, W. Karlsson) (PP) – 58:38	6–4
V. Arvidsson (R. Rakell, N. Lundström) (ENG) – 59:01	7–4

26 min
Penalties
30 min
42
Shots
38

==== Group B ====
Pos	Team	Pld	W	OTW	OTL	L	GF	GA	GD	Pts	Qualification
1	Canada	4	4	0	0	0	21	8	+13	12	Semifinals
2	Russia (H)	4	2	1	0	1	13	7	+6	8	Quarterfinals
3	United States	4	2	0	0	2	19	7	+12	6	Quarterfinals
4	Slovakia	4	0	1	1	2	10	19	−9	3	Relegation round
5	Germany	4	0	0	1	3	4	26	−22	1	Relegation round

Source: IIHF
(H) Host

All times are local (Yekaterinburg Time – UTC+6).

December 26, 2012; 15:30	Germany	3–9 (1–2, 2–5, 0–2)	Canada	Ufa Arena; Attendance: 3,618

Game reference

Elmar Trautmann
Goalies
Malcolm Subban
Referees:
(United States) Harry Dumas
(Russia) Roman Gofman
Linesmen:
(Latvia) Raivis Jučers
(Estonia) Anton Semjonov

	0–1	03:02 – X. Ouellet (R. Nugent-Hopkins) (PP)
	0–2	09:36 – R. Nugent-Hopkins (J. Huberdeau)
T. Rieder (L. Pföderl, D. Kahun) (PP) – 19:29	1–2
	1–3	22:18 – M. Scheifele (R. Nugent-Hopkins) (SH)
	1–4	24:24 – J. Huberdeau (D. Hamilton, R. Nugent-Hopkins) (PP)
	1–5	32:22 – T. Rattie (A. Camara, N. MacKinnon)
	1–6	33:48 – R. Strome (J. Drouin, B. Ritchie)
L. Pföderl (L. Draisaitl, O. Mebus) 36:22	2–6
N. Latta – 38:14	3–6
	3–7	39:58 – M. Scheifele (R. Nugent-Hopkins, J. Huberdeau)
	3–8	44:46 – J. Drouin (S. Harrington, R. Strome)
	3–9	57:03 – T. Wotherspoon (R. Strome, B. Ritchie)

10 min
Penalties
8 min
28
Shots
46

December 26, 2012; 20:00	Slovakia	2–3 OT (0–1, 1–1, 1–0) (OT: 0–1)	Russia	Ufa Arena; Attendance: 6,221

Game reference

Adam Nagy
Goalies
Andrei Vasilevski
Referees:
(Switzerland) Didier Massy
(Switzerland) Daniel Stricker
Linesmen:
(Sweden) Tobias Haster
(Switzerland) Roman Kaderli

	0–1	14:04 – N. Kucherov (M. Grigorenko)
	0–2	28:28 – A. Khokhlachev (A. Sigaryov, N. Yakupov)
M. Matis (T. Mikúš, M. Daňo) – 34:13	1–2
R. Mráz (D. Hudec) (PP) – 59:24	2–2
	2–3	64:50 – A. Yarullin (N. Nesterov) (PP)

10 min
Penalties
10 min
34
Shots
27

December 27, 2012; 20:00	United States	8–0 (3–0, 3–0, 2–0)	Germany	Ufa Arena; Attendance: 1,378

Game reference

John Gibson
Jon Gillies
Goalies
Marvin Cupper
Referees:
(Russia) Sergei Kulakov
(Canada) Pat Smith
Linesmen:
(Switzerland) Roman Kaderli
(Finland) Masi Puolakka

S. Kuraly (A. Galchenyuk, R. Barber) – 00:19	1–0
J. Trouba (B. Pietila) – 08:30	2–0
A. Galchenyuk (S. Kuraly, R. Barber) – 09:54	3–0
R. Barber (A. Galchenyuk) – 20:14	4–0
S. Gostisbehere (S. Jones, R. Grimaldi) (PP1) – 26:33	5–0
R. Hartman (B. Pietila, C. Bardreau) – 27:55	6–0
J. Miller – 48:36	7–0
S. Jones – 50:32	8–0

14 min
Penalties
12 min
46
Shots
26

December 28, 2012; 15:30	Canada	6–3 (0–2, 4–1, 2–0)	Slovakia	Ufa Arena; Attendance: 2,818

Game reference

Malcolm Subban
Goalies
Adam Nagy
Referees:
(Czech Republic) Pavel Hodek
(Finland) Jari Levonen
Linesmen:
(Sweden) Tobias Haster
(Latvia) Raivis Jučers

	0–1	2:53 – M. Daňo (M. Matis, T. Mikúš)
	0–2	15:28 – T. Mikúš (M. Réway, M. Daňo) (PP)
R. Strome (J. Drouin, M. Rielly) – 22:16	1–2
	1–3	30:35 – M. Daňo (E. Bagin) (PP2)
M. Rielly (M. Scheifele, R. Nugent-Hopkins) (PP) – 31:42	2–3
T. Rattie (X. Ouellet, M. Rielly) (PP) – 35:18	3–3
M. Scheifele (X. Ouellet, G. Reinhart) – 39:01	4–3
R. Nugent-Hopkins (J. Huberdeau) – 43:32	5–3
R. Strome (T. Wotherspoon) – 47:05	6–3

58 min
Penalties
10 min
30
Shots
28

December 28, 2012; 20:00	Russia	2–1 (1–0, 0–1, 1–0)	United States	Ufa Arena; Attendance: 7,620

Game reference

Andrei Makarov
Goalies
John Gibson
Referees:
(Sweden) Mikael Nord
(Sweden) Mikael Sjöqvist
Linesmen:
(Finland) Masi Puolakka
(Estonia) Anton Semjonov

A. Yarullin (N. Nesterov, N. Yakupov) (PP) – 2:42	1–0
	1–1	33:18 – J. Trouba (A. Galchenyuk) (PP)
V. Tkachyov (V. Nichushkin, A. Sergeyev) – 44:10	2–1

18 min
Penalties
8 min
30
Shots
42

December 29, 2012; 20:00	Germany	0–7 (0–3, 0–1, 0–3)	Russia	Ufa Arena; Attendance: 7,025

Game reference

Marvin Cupper
Goalies
Andrei Vasilevski
Referees:
(Czech Republic) Pavel Hodek
(United States) Steve Patafie
Linesmen:
(Latvia) Raivis Jučers
(Switzerland) Roman Kaderli

0–1	1:18 – N. Kucherov (M. Grigorenko, A. Slepyshev)
0–2	9:37 – N. Yakopov (A. Khokhlachev)
0–3	12:38 – D. Zharkov (A. Khokhlachev, N. Yakupov)
0–4	33:57 – A. Yarullin (M. Grigorenko, N. Kucherov) (PP)
0–5	42:43 – Y. Kosov (A. Mironov)
0–6	53:33 – Y. Kosov
0–7	58:05 – Y. Kosov (M. Shalunov) (SH)

8 min
Penalties
6 min
41
Shots
43

December 30, 2012; 15:30	Canada	2–1 (2–0, 0–0, 0–1)	United States	Ufa Arena; Attendance: 6,985

Game reference

Malcolm Subban
Goalies
John Gibson
Referees:
(Switzerland) Didier Massy
(Switzerland) Daniel Stricker
Linesmen:
(Finland) Masi Puolakka
(Russia) Stanislav Raming

R. Nugent-Hopkins (J. Huberdeau, M. Scheifele) – 7:13	1–0
R. Strome (B. Ritchie, A. Camara) – 14:44	2–0
	2–1	51:02 – J. Trouba (A. Galchenyuk, M. Reilly) (PP)

14 min
Penalties
34 min
32
Shots
37

December 30, 2012; 20:00	Slovakia	2–1 OT (0–0, 0–1, 1–0) (OT: 1–0)	Germany	Ufa Arena; Attendance: 1,578

Game reference

Adam Nagy
Goalies
Marvin Cupper
Referees:
(Sweden) Mikael Nord
(Sweden) Mikael Sjöqvist
Linesmen:
(Switzerland) Roman Kaderli
(Estonia) Anton Semjonov

	0–1	33:56 – T. Rieder (L. Draisaitl, D. Kahun) (PP)
B. Mráz (E. Bagin, R. Mráz) – 44:02	1–1
P. Čerešňák (M. Daňo, M. Réway) (PP) – 61:40	2–1

6 min
Penalties
14 min
42
Shots
18

December 31, 2012; 16:00	United States	9–3 (5–2, 3–0, 1–1)	Slovakia	Ufa Arena; Attendance: 2,160

Game reference

John Gibson
Goalies
Adam Nagy
Patrik Romančík
Referees:
(Czech Republic) Pavel Hodek
(Sweden) Mikael Nord
Linesmen:
(Latvia) Raivis Jučers
(Finland) Masi Puolakka

C. Bardreau (R. Hartman, J. Gibson) – 4:05	1–0
	1–1	4:19 – M. Matis (M. Kolena)
J. McCabe (J. Vesey, J. Miller) – 5:10	2–1
J. Gaudreau (S. Gostisbehere, J. Vesey) – 9:00	3–1
M. Reilly (J. Vesey, J. Miller) – 11:46	4–1
J. Trouba (S. Kuraly, A. Galchenyuk) (PP) – 13:50	5–1
	5–2	18:35 – R. Mráz, (P. Čerešňák, T. Nechala) (PP)
J. Gaudreau (J. McCabe, V. Trocheck) (PP) – 24:55	6–2
V. Trocheck (J. Gaudreau) (PP) – 26:16	7–2
V. Trocheck (T. Biggs, M. Lucia) – 30:00	8–2
	8–3	49:21 – M. Matis (M. Kolena, M. Uhrík) (PP)
A. Galchenyuk (C. Murphy, S. Jones) (PP) – 56:16	9–3

37 min
Penalties
28 min
40
Shots
29

December 31, 2012; 20:00	Russia	1–4 (1–2, 0–1, 0–1)	Canada	Ufa Arena; Attendance: 7,988

Game reference

Andrei Makarov
Goalies
Malcolm Subban
Referees:
(United States) Harry Dumas
(Sweden) Mikael Sjöqvist
Linesmen:
(United States) Tommy George
(Slovakia) Peter Stano

	0–1	14:04 – D. Hamilton (R. Nugent-Hopkins) (PP)
	0–2	15:58 – M. Scheifele (J. Huberdeau, R. Nugent-Hopkins) (PP)
N. Kucherov – 17:36	1–2
	1–3	26:31 – J. Drouin (R. Nugent-Hopkins)
	1–4	59:32 – J. Huberdeau (ENG)

29 min
Penalties
4 min
22
Shots
48

=== Relegation round ===
The results from matches between teams from the same group in the preliminary round are carried forward to this round.

Pos	Team	Pld	W	OTW	OTL	L	GF	GA	GD	Pts	Relegation
1	Finland	3	3	0	0	0	24	5	+19	9	
2	Slovakia	3	1	1	0	1	11	15	−4	5	
3	Germany	3	1	0	1	1	6	12	−6	4	
4	Latvia	3	0	0	0	3	6	15	−9	0	Relegated to the 2014 Division I A

Source: IIHF

All times are local (Yekaterinburg Time – UTC+6).

January 2, 2013; 17:00	Finland	8–0 (1–0, 2–0, 5–0)	Germany	Ice Palace Salavat Yulaev; Attendance: 1,308

Game reference

Janne Juvonen
Goalies
Marvin Cupper
Referees:
(Russia) Sergei Kulakov
(Switzerland) Daniel Stricker
Linesmen:
(Latvia) Raivis Jučers
(Russia) Dmitry Sivov

A. Lehkonen (T. Nykopp, M. Lamberg) – 16:12	1–0
M. Granlund (T. Teräväinen, M. Salomäki) – 27:39	2–0
A. Barkov (J. Armia) (PP) – 34:48	3–0
M. Salomäki (T. Teräväinen, M. Granlund) – 40:21	4–0
V. Pokka (A. Lehkonen) – 44:56	5–0
A. Barkov (J. Armia, J. Vainio) – 56:27	6–0
V. Pokka (T. Teräväinen, M. Granlund) – 56:50	7–0
J. Armia (R. Ristolainen, M. Granlund) (PP2) – 58:57	8–0

6 min
Penalties
16 min
56
Shots
15

January 3, 2013; 17:00	Slovakia	5–3 (1–1, 2–0, 2–2)	Latvia	Ice Palace Salavat Yulaev; Attendance: 1,457

Game reference

Adam Nagy
Goalies
Elvis Merzļikins
Referees:
(Germany) Georgij Jablukov
(Finland) Jari Levonen
Linesmen:
(Sweden) Tobias Haster
(Russia) Dmitry Sivov

	0–1	1:26 – K. Ozoliņš (R. Bukarts)
A. Bíreš (K. Korim, B. Mráz) – 14:03	1–1
T. Mikúš (M. Matis, M. Uhrík) – 30:54	2–1
M. Daňo (T. Nechala) (PP) – 33:19	3–1
	3–2	45:14 – Ņ. Jevpalovs (T. Bļugers, K. Lipsbergs)
	3–3	50:22 – E. Kulda (E. Siksna, Ņ. Jevpalovs) (PP)
A. Bíreš (M. Daňo, P. Čerešňák) – 54:35	4–3
M. Daňo (ENG) – 59:47	5–3

6 min
Penalties
8 min
27
Shots
40

January 4, 2013; 15:00	Germany	5–2 (0–1, 3–0, 2–1)	Latvia	Ice Palace Salavat Yulaev; Attendance: 1,382

Game reference

Marvin Cupper
Goalies
Ivars Punnenovs
Referees:
(Russia) Roman Gofman
(Sweden) Mikael Sjöqvist
Linesmen:
(Canada) François Dussureault
(Switzerland) Roman Kaderli

	0–1	15:25 – L. Rancevs (R. Rosinskis, A. Ševčenko)
T. Rieder (L. Draisaitl) – 20:06	1–1
L. Draisaitl (D. Kahun, T. Rieder) (PP) – 30:30	2–1
C. Kretschmann – 36:04	3–1
L. Draisaitl (T. Rieder) – 45:36	4–1
S. Uvira (N. Latta) (SH, ENG) – 55:28	5–1
	5–2	58:32 – A. Kuzmenkovs (P. Zvirbulis, R. Lipsbergs)

12 min
Penalties
24 min
40
Shots
27

January 4, 2013; 19:00	Finland	11–4 (3–0, 4–3, 4–1)	Slovakia	Ice Palace Salavat Yulaev; Attendance: 1,352

Game reference

Joonas Korpisalo
Goalies
Adam Nagy
Patrik Romančík
Referees:
(Russia) Sergei Kulakov
(Switzerland) Daniel Stricker
Linesmen:
(Sweden) Tobias Haster
(Latvia) Raivis Jučers

V. Järveläinen (T. Teräväinen) – 3:53	1–0
M. Salomäki (J. Armia) – 8:23	2–0
J. Armia (M. Salomäki) – 13:53	3–0
A. Barkov (V. Pokka, J. Korpisalo) (PP) – 21:14	4–0
J. Armia (R. Ristolainen, O. Määttä) – 22:54	5–0
J. Armia (V. Pokka, M. Granlund) – 23:26	6–0
	6–1	28:03 – B. Mráz (A. Bíreš, T. Rusina)
	6–2	33:49 – R. Buri (M. Daňo) (PP)
	6–3	34:19 – A. Bíreš (B. Mráz)
M. Salomäki (O. Määttä, M. Granlund) (PP) – 37:47	7–3
	7–4	44:29 – A. Bíreš (M. Kolena, B. Mráz)
A. Lehkonen – 45:10	8–4
T. Teräväinen (M. Granlund) (PP) – 47:48	9–4
T. Teräväinen (A. Barkov, V. Järveläinen) – 56:18	10–4
O. Määttä (T. Teräväinen, M. Lamberg) – 58:18	11–4

20 min
Penalties
8 min
36
Shots
24

=== Final round ===
Bracket

Quarterfinals
B2	Russia (GWS)	4
A3	Switzerland	3
A2	Czech Republic	0
B3	United States	7

Semifinals
A1	Sweden (GWS)	3
B2	Russia	2
B1	Canada	1
B3	United States	5

Final
A1	Sweden	1
B3	United States	3
Third place
B1	Canada	5
B2	Russia (OT)	6

==== Quarterfinals ====
January 2, 2013; 15:00	Czech Republic	0–7 (0–1, 0–5, 0–1)	United States	Ufa Arena; Attendance: 3,247

Game reference

Patrik Bartosak
Matej Machovsky
Goalies
John Gibson
Referees:
(Russia) Roman Gofman
(Canada) Pat Smith
Linesmen:
(Switzerland) Roman Kaderli
(Russia) Stanislav Raming

0–1	11:45 – J. Gaudreau (J. Trouba, S. Jones) (PP2)
0–2	20:28 – J. Gaudreau (J. Miller, J. McCabe) (PP)
0–3	21:08 – R. Hartman
0–4	28:44 – R. Barber (A. Galchenyuk, J. Trouba) (PP)
0–5	32:13 – R. Barber (S. Jones)
0–6	39:47 – J. Gaudreau (J. Miller, S. Jones) (PP)
0–7	44:08 – J. Miller (J. Trouba, S. Jones) (PP2)

44 min
Penalties
20 min
31
Shots
37

January 2, 2013; 19:00	Russia	4–3 GWS (1–1, 1–1, 1–1) (OT: 0–0) (SO: 1–0)	Switzerland	Ufa Arena; Attendance: 7,530

Game reference

Andrei Vasilevski
Goalies
Melvin Nyffeler
Referees:
(Czech Republic) Pavel Hodek
(Sweden) Mikael Nord
Linesmen:
(Finland) Masi Puolakka
(Estonia) Anton Semjonov

A. Khokhlachev (N. Yakupov, N. Nesterov) (PP) – 6:07	1–0
	1–1	10:05 – C. Bertschy (SH)
M. Grigorenko (N. Kucherov) – 29:07	2–1
	2–2	32:37 – M. Ness (S. Guerra, D. Simion)
	2–3	48:57 – S. Andrighetto
N. Kucherov (K. Dyakov, M. Grigorenko) (PP) – 58:21	3–3

M. Grigorenko (miss)
N. Yakupov (miss)
N. Kucherov (miss)
M. Grigorenko
N. Kucherov
Shootout
(miss) T. Richard
(miss) C. Bertschy
(miss) S. Andrighetto
A. Bertaggia
(miss) A. Bertaggia
16 min
Penalties
18 min
37
Shots
44

==== Semifinals ====
January 3, 2013; 15:00	Canada	1–5 (0–2, 0–2, 1–1)	United States	Ufa Arena; Attendance: 4,781

Game reference

Malcolm Subban
Jordan Binnington
Goalies
John Gibson
Referees:
(Switzerland) Didier Massy
(Sweden) Mikael Sjöqvist
Linesmen:
(Russia) Stanislav Raming
(Slovakia) Peter Stano

	0–1	7:18 – J. McCabe (R. Barber, M. Reilly)
	0–2	16:02 – J. McCabe (R. Grimaldi, V. Trocheck)
	0–3	22:58 – J. Gaudreau (J. McCabe, J. Gibson)
	0–4	32:44 – J. Vesey (J. Gaudreau, J. Miller)
T. Rattie (P. Danault) (SH) – 44:03	1–4
	1–5	55:41 – J. Gaudreau (J. Vesey, J. Miller)

16 min
Penalties
6 min
34
Shots
42

January 3, 2013; 19:00	Sweden	3–2 GWS (2–0, 0–1, 0–1) (OT: 0–0) (SO: 1–0)	Russia	Ufa Arena; Attendance: 7,698

Game reference

Niklas Lundström
Goalies
Andrei Vasilevski
Referees:
(United States) Harry Dumas
(United States) Steve Patafie
Linesmen:
(Canada) François Dussureault
(United States) Tommy George

E. Lindholm (V. Rask, E. Molin) (PP) – 6:35	1–0
F- Forsberg (R. Bengtsson, R. Hägg) – 9:38	2–0
	2–1	27:32 – A. Mironov (N. Yakupov, K. Kapustin)
	2–2	47:56 – M. Grigorenko (N. Kucherov, Y. Kosov)

M. Vikstrand (miss)
V. Rask (miss)
S. Collberg
Shootout
(miss) M. Grigorenko
(miss) N. Yakupov
(miss) N. Kucherov
2 min
Penalties
4 min
41
Shots
29

==== Fifth place game ====
January 4, 2013; 19:00	Czech Republic	4–3 (0–1, 3–1, 1–1)	Switzerland	Ufa Arena; Attendance: 1,733

Game reference

Patrik Bartošák
Goalies
Luca Boltshauser
Referees:
(Germany) Georgij Jablukov
(Finland) Jari Levonen
Linesmen:
(Finland) Masi Puolakka
(Russia) Dmitry Sivov

	0–1	4:30 – L. Sieber (SH)
D. Jaškin (P. Šidlík, T. Hyka) (PP) – 21:42	1–1
T. Hyka (T. Hertl) – 37:22	2–1
	2–2	38:39 – S. Andrighetto (L. Martschini)
M. Frk (T. Pavelka, P. Beránek) – 38:53	3–2
T. Hertl (T. Hyka, L. Sedlák) (PP) – 51:27	4–2
	4–3	58:58 – S. Andrighetto (C. Bertschy, C. Marti) (PP)

20 min
Penalties
20 min
37
Shots
23

==== Bronze medal game ====
January 5, 2013; 15:00	Canada	5–6 OT (2–3, 2–1, 1–1) (OT: 0–1)	Russia	Ufa Arena; Attendance: 7,617

Game reference

Jordan Binnington
Malcolm Subban
Goalies
Andrei Makarov
Referees:
(United States) Harry Dumas
(United States) Steve Patafie
Linesmen:
(United States) Tommy George
(Estonia) Anton Semjonov

	0–1	3:31 – A. Khokhlachev (K. Dyakov, A. Yarullin)
	0–2	4:56 – N. Yakupov (A. Yarullin, N. Nesterov) (PP)
R. Nugent-Hopkins (M. Scheifele) (PP) – 6:58	1–2
	1–3	7:54 – K. Dyakov (V. Tkachyov)
J. Huberdeau (R. Nugent-Hopkins, R. Murphy) (PP) – 15:51	2–3
M. Scheifele (R. Nugent-Hopkins, R. Murphy) (PP) – 23:16	3–3
	3–4	24:23 – Y. Mozer (M. Shalunov)
R. Murphy (R. Nugent-Hopkins, J. Huberdeau) (PP) – 32:53	4–4
	4–5	41:00 – N. Yakupov (K. Kapustin) (PP)
B. Ritchie (S. Harrington) – 50:46	5–5
	5–6	61:35 – V. Nichushkin (V. Tkachyov, A. Sergeyev)

10 min
Penalties
10 min
45
Shots
25

==== Final ====
January 5, 2013; 19:00	Sweden	1–3 (0–0, 1–2, 0–1)	United States	Ufa Arena; Attendance: 6,001

Game reference

Niklas Lundström
Goalies
John Gibson
Referees:
(Switzerland) Didier Massy
(Canada) Pat Smith
Linesmen:
(Russia) Stanislav Raming
(Slovakia) Peter Stano

F. Sandberg (R. Rakell) (PP) – 21:09	1–0
	1–1	27:42 – R. Grimaldi (P. Sieloff, V. Trocheck)
	1–2	30:27 – R. Grimaldi (J. Trouba)
	1–3	59:44 – V. Trocheck (J. Miller) (ENG)

8 min
Penalties
8 min
27
Shots
36

=== Statistics ===
==== Scoring leaders ====
Pos	Player	Country	GP	G	A	Pts	+/−	PIM
1	Ryan Nugent-Hopkins	Canada	6	4	11	15	+6	4
2	Joel Armia	Finland	6	6	6	12	0	12
3	Markus Granlund	Finland	6	5	7	12	−1	4
4	Teuvo Teräväinen	Finland	6	5	6	11	+6	2
5	Johnny Gaudreau	United States	7	7	2	9	+2	4
6	Marko Daňo	Slovakia	6	4	5	9	−1	12
7	Jacob Trouba	United States	7	4	5	9	+2	10
8	Jonathan Huberdeau	Canada	6	3	6	9	0	4
9	J. T. Miller	United States	7	2	7	9	+5	2
10	Sven Andrighetto	Switzerland	6	5	3	8	+1	4
10	Mark Scheifele	Canada	6	5	3	8	+1	2

GP = Games played; G = Goals; A = Assists; Pts = Points; +/− = Plus–minus; PIM = Penalties In Minutes

Source: IIHF.com

==== Goaltending leaders ====
(minimum 40% team's total ice time)

Pos	Player	Country	TOI	GA	GAA	Sv%	SO
1	John Gibson	United States	398:07	9	1.36	95.54	1
2	Andrei Vasilevski	Russia	264:50	8	1.81	95.00	1
3	Niklas Lundström	Sweden	224:25	6	1.60	94.39	0
4	Andrei Makarov	Russia	180:31	9	2.99	93.28	0
5	Melvin Nyffeler	Switzerland	261:39	16	3.67	90.24	0

TOI = Time on ice (minutes:seconds); SA = Shots against; GA = Goals against; GAA = Goals against average; Sv% = Save percentage; SO = Shutouts

Source: IIHF.com

=== Tournament awards ===
References: 1 2

Most Valuable Player

- Goaltender: (United States) John Gibson

All-star team

- Goaltender: (United States) John Gibson
- Defencemen: (United States) Jacob Trouba, (United States) Jake McCabe
- Forwards: (Canada) Ryan Nugent-Hopkins, (Sweden) Filip Forsberg, (United States) Johnny Gaudreau

IIHF best player awards

- Goaltender: (United States) John Gibson
- Defenceman: (United States) Jacob Trouba
- Forward: (Canada) Ryan Nugent-Hopkins

=== Final standings ===
Rank	Team
1st place, gold medalist(s)	United States
2nd place, silver medalist(s)	Sweden
3rd place, bronze medalist(s)	Russia
4th	Canada
5th	Czech Republic
6th	Switzerland
7th	Finland
8th	Slovakia
9th	Germany
10th	Latvia

Relegated to the 2014 Division I A

2013 Junior Ice Hockey World champions

United States
Third title

=== Medalists ===
Gold	Silver	Bronze
United States #3 – Seth Jones #5 – Connor Murphy #6 – Mike Reilly #7 – Sean Kuraly #8 – Jacob Trouba #10 – J. T. Miller #12 – Mario Lucia #13 – Johnny Gaudreau #14 – Shayne Gostisbehere #15 – Alex Galchenyuk #16 – Riley Barber #18 – Cole Bardreau #19 – Jake McCabe #20 – Blake Pietila #21 – Ryan Hartman #22 – Tyler Biggs #23 – Rocco Grimaldi #25 – Vincent Trocheck #26 – Jimmy Vesey #27 – Patrick Sieloff #29 – Garret Sparks #30 – Jon Gillies #35 – John Gibson	Sweden #1 – Joel Lassinantti #4 – Christian Djoos #5 – Rasmus Bengtsson #6 – Emil Djuse #7 – Tom Nilsson #8 – Linus Arnesson #9 – Mikael Vikstrand #10 – Alexander Wennberg #11 – Jeremy Boyce-Rotevall #13 – Viktor Arvidsson #14 – Robert Hägg #15 – Sebastian Collberg #16 – Filip Forsberg #17 – William Karlsson #19 – Elias Lindholm #23 – Victor Rask #24 – Rickard Rakell #25 – Jacob de la Rose #26 – Nick Sörensen #27 – Filip Sandberg #29 – Emil Molin #30 – Niklas Lundström #35 – Oscar Dansk	Russia #1 – Igor Ustinski #5 – Albert Yarullin #7 – Artyom Sergeyev #8 – Maxim Shalunov #9 – Nikita Nesterov #10 – Nail Yakupov #11 – Yevgeni Mozer #12 – Andrei Sigaryov #14 – Vladimir Tkachyov #15 – Valeri Nichushkin #16 – Nikita Kucherov #17 – Anton Slepyshev #18 – Yaroslav Kosov #19 – Alexander Khokhlachev #20 – Andrei Makarov #21 – Kirill Kapustin #22 – Andrei Mironov #25 – Mikhail Grigorenko #26 – Daniil Zharkov #27 – Kirill Dyakov #28 – Yaroslav Dyblenko #29 – Pavel Koledov #30 – Andrei Vasilevski

Source: 1 2 3

== Division I ==
=== Group A ===
The Division I A tournament was played in Amiens, France, from 9 to 15 December 2012.

Pos	Team	Pld	W	OTW	OTL	L	GF	GA	GD	Pts	Promotion or relegation
1	Norway	5	4	1	0	0	19	7	+12	14	Promoted to the 2014 Top Division
2	Belarus	5	4	0	0	1	19	8	+11	12	
3	Denmark	5	3	0	1	1	20	15	+5	10	
4	Slovenia	5	1	1	0	3	13	14	−1	5	
5	Austria	5	1	0	1	3	13	21	−8	4	
6	France (H)	5	0	0	0	5	9	28	−19	0	Relegated to the 2014 Division I B

Source: IIHF
(H) Host

=== Group B ===
The Division I B tournament was played in Donetsk, Ukraine, from 10 to 16 December 2012.

Pos	Team	Pld	W	OTW	OTL	L	GF	GA	GD	Pts	Promotion or relegation
1	Poland	5	4	0	0	1	20	9	+11	12	Promoted to the 2014 Division I A
2	Kazakhstan	5	3	1	0	1	16	9	+7	11	
3	Italy	5	3	0	0	2	15	6	+9	9	
4	Ukraine (H)	5	2	1	1	1	8	7	+1	9	
5	Great Britain	5	1	0	1	3	8	18	−10	4	
6	Croatia	5	0	0	0	5	1	19	−18	0	Relegated to the 2014 Division II A

Source: IIHF
(H) Host

== Division II ==
=== Group A ===
The Division II A tournament was played in Brașov, Romania, from 9 to 15 December 2012.

Pos	Team	Pld	W	OTW	OTL	L	GF	GA	GD	Pts	Promotion or relegation
1	Japan	5	5	0	0	0	31	8	+23	15	Promoted to the 2014 Division I B
2	Hungary	5	3	1	0	1	22	16	+6	11	
3	Romania (H)	5	3	0	0	2	18	19	−1	9	
4	Netherlands	5	2	0	1	2	17	23	−6	7	
5	Lithuania	5	1	0	0	4	14	19	−5	3	
6	Spain	5	0	0	0	5	12	29	−17	0	Relegated to the 2014 Division II B

Source: IIHF
(H) Host

=== Group B ===
The Division II B tournament was played in Belgrade, Serbia, from 12 to 18 January 2013.

Pos	Team	Pld	W	OTW	OTL	L	GF	GA	GD	Pts	Promotion or relegation
1	Estonia	5	5	0	0	0	62	6	+56	15	Promoted to the 2014 Division II A
2	South Korea	5	4	0	0	1	23	14	+9	12	
3	Serbia (H)	5	2	0	0	3	17	21	−4	6	
4	Australia	5	2	0	0	3	12	22	−10	6	
5	Iceland	5	2	0	0	3	12	29	−17	6	
6	Belgium	5	0	0	0	5	13	47	−34	0	Relegated to the 2014 Division III

Source: IIHF
(H) Host

== Division III ==
The Division III tournament was played in Sofia, Bulgaria, from 14 to 20 January 2013.

Pos	Team	Pld	W	OTW	OTL	L	GF	GA	GD	Pts	Promotion
1	China	5	5	0	0	0	32	6	+26	15	Promoted to the 2014 Division II B
2	Bulgaria (H)	5	4	0	0	1	19	14	+5	12	
3	New Zealand	5	3	0	0	2	13	12	+1	9	
4	Mexico	5	2	0	0	3	18	12	+6	6	
5	Turkey	5	1	0	0	4	15	28	−13	3	
–	~~United Arab Emirates~~ (Note: United Arab Emirates were disqualified and all their games were counted as 5-0 wins for their opponents. They played each team in an exhibition schedule, losing each game with a combined total of two goals for and sixty-eight goals against.) (D)	5	0	0	0	5	0	25	−25	0	Disqualified

Source: IIHF
(D) Disqualified; (H) Host
