= Rasmus Bengtsson (ice hockey) =

Swedish ice hockey player (born 1993)

- Born: May 14, 1993 (age 32) Landskrona, Sweden
- Height: 6 ft 2 in (188 cm)
- Weight: 196 lb (89 kg; 14 st 0 lb)
- Position: Defence
- Shoots: Left
- Allsv team Former teams: IK Oskarshamn; Rögle BK; Djurgårdens IF; HV71
- NHL draft: 59th overall, 2011; Florida Panthers
- Playing career: 2010–present

Rasmus Bengtsson (born May 14, 1993) is a Swedish professional ice hockey player. He is currently playing for IK Oskarshamn of the HockeyAllsvenskan (Allsv). He was drafted in the second round of the 2011 NHL entry draft by the Florida Panthers with the 59th overall selection.

== Playing career ==
Bengtsson was named to the 2008–09 Rikspucken All-Star Team. Rikspucken (which translates from Swedish as “National puck”) was a one-time tournament which occurred in 2009 for junior players who became too old for TV-pucken when the Swedish Ice Hockey Association lowered the maximum age from 16 to 15.

He had his breakthrough season playing for Rögle J20 during the 2009–10 season, and signed on for Rögle's senior team in June 2010.

Following Djurgårdens IF demotion to the HockeyAllsvenskan in the 2021–22 season, Bengtsson left the club and joined newly promoted HV71 on a three-year contract on 13 May 2022.

Bengtsson made 12 scoreless appearances with HV71 to begin the 2022–23 season before he was loaned for the remainder of the season to fellow SHL club, IK Oskarshamn, on 26 November 2022.

== Career statistics ==
=== Regular season and playoffs ===
			Regular season					Playoffs
Season	Team	League	GP	G	A	Pts	PIM	GP	G	A	Pts	PIM
2009–10	Rögle BK	J20	42	3	20	23	14	2	1	1	2	0
2010–11	Rögle BK	J20	17	1	3	4	8	3	1	1	2	0
2010–11	Rögle BK	Allsv	45	2	7	9	6	6	0	1	1	0
2011–12	Rögle BK	J20	15	3	8	11	8	—	—	—	—	—
2011–12	Rögle BK	Allsv	18	0	3	3	2	—	—	—	—	—
2011–12	Muskegon Lumberjacks	USHL	34	3	7	10	2	—	—	—	—	—
2012–13	Muskegon Lumberjacks	USHL	49	0	24	24	16	3	0	0	0	2
2013–14	VIK Västerås HK	Allsv	47	5	6	11	16	10	1	0	1	0
2014–15	Rögle BK	Allsv	46	1	8	9	12	10	0	4	4	4
2015–16	Rögle BK	SHL	4	0	0	0	0	—	—	—	—	—
2015–16	Rögle BK	J20	1	0	1	1	0	—	—	—	—	—
2015–16	IF Björklöven	Allsv	24	1	9	10	6	—	—	—	—	—
2016–17	BIK Karlskoga	Allsv	52	1	2	3	24	10	0	1	1	2
2017–18	BIK Karlskoga	Allsv	49	0	12	12	14	—	—	—	—	—
2018–19	Tingsryds AIF	Allsv	52	3	16	19	18	—	—	—	—	—
2019–20	Tingsryds AIF	Allsv	52	5	18	23	26	—	—	—	—	—
2020–21	Tingsryds AIF	Allsv	45	13	24	37	20	2	1	2	3	0
2021–22	Djurgårdens IF	SHL	50	5	12	17	12	—	—	—	—	—
2022–23	HV71	SHL	12	0	0	0	2	—	—	—	—	—
2022–23	IK Oskarshamn	SHL	32	0	11	11	6	3	0	2	2	0
2023–24	IK Oskarshamn	SHL	52	0	11	11	12	—	—	—	—	—
SHL totals			150	5	34	39	32	3	0	2	2	0

Medal record

Ice hockey

Representing Sweden

World Junior Championships
Silver medal – second place	2013 Ufa	

=== International ===
Year	Team	Event	Result	GP	G	A	Pts	PIM
2010	Sweden	U17	3rd place, bronze medalist(s)	6	1	2	3	2
2011	Sweden	U18	2nd place, silver medalist(s)	6	0	4	4	2
2013	Sweden	WJC	2nd place, silver medalist(s)	4	0	1	1	0
Junior totals				16	1	7	8	4

== Awards and honours ==
- 2008–09 Rikspucken All-Star Team
- 2010 World U-17 Hockey Challenge (Bronze Medal with Team Sweden)
- 2011 IIHF World U18 Championships (Silver Medal with Team Sweden)
