= Tomáš Hyka =

Czech ice hockey player (born 1993)

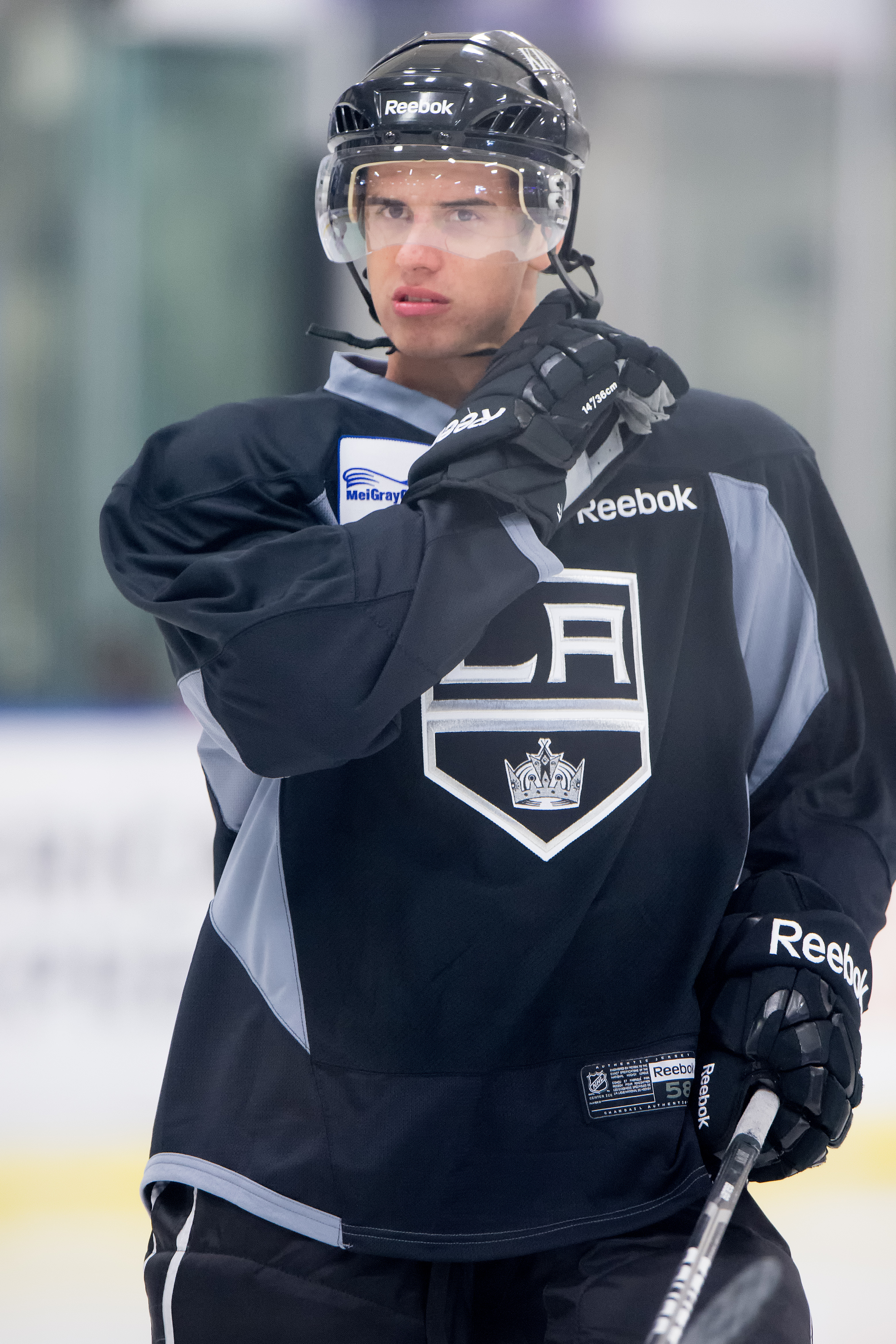
- Born: 23 March 1993 (age 33) Mladá Boleslav, Czech Republic
- Height: 5 ft 11 in (180 cm)
- Weight: 159 lb (72 kg; 11 st 5 lb)
- Position: Forward
- Shoots: Right
- ELH team Former teams: HC Sparta Praha; BK Mladá Boleslav; Färjestad BK; Vegas Golden Knights; Traktor Chelyabinsk; HC Dynamo Pardubice
- National team: Czech Republic
- NHL draft: 171st overall, 2012; Los Angeles Kings
- Playing career: 2010–present

Tomáš Hyka (born 23 March 1993) is a Czech professional ice hockey player who is currently playing for HC Sparta Praha of the Czech Extraliga (ELH). He previously played in the National Hockey League (NHL) with the Vegas Golden Knights.

== Playing career ==
Hyka began his career his hometown team BK Mladá Boleslav and made his debut for the senior team during the 2010-11 Czech Extraliga season. In the 2011–12 NHL preseason, the Philadelphia Flyers invited Hyka to their training camp. Hyka scored a goal in his sole preseason game, before the Flyers discovered that the current Collective Bargaining Agreement did not allow Hyka to be signed by them and released him to his QMJHL team, the Gatineau Olympiques. He was subsequently drafted by the Los Angeles Kings in the 2012 NHL entry draft but eventually went unsigned.

In 2013, Hyka moved to Sweden to sign for Färjestad BK of the Elitserien. After one season in Sweden, Hyka returned to Mladá Boleslav.

On 1 June 2017, Hyka was signed by the Vegas Golden Knights to a one-year contract, becoming the third player in their organization's history. Hyka was called up to the NHL from the Chicago Wolves for the first time on 18 December 2017, only to be sent back two days later without making his NHL debut. However, Hyka was recalled again on 19 February 2018 and he made his NHL debut that night against the Anaheim Ducks. He had two shots on net and played 11:37 minutes. Hyka scored his first NHL goal on 23 February 2018 in a game against the Vancouver Canucks.

At the conclusion of his contract with the Golden Knights and unable to cement a full-time role in the NHL, Hyka opted to return to Europe in agreeing to a two-year contract with Russian club, Traktor Chelyabinsk of the KHL on 25 June 2019.

Following three seasons in Russia with Traktor Chelyabinsk, Hyka left as a free agent to return to his homeland in agreeing to a three-year contract with HC Dynamo Pardubice of the ELH on 10 May 2022.

== Career statistics ==
=== Regular season and playoffs ===
			Regular season					Playoffs
Season	Team	League	GP	G	A	Pts	PIM	GP	G	A	Pts	PIM
2007–08	BK Mladá Boleslav	CZE U18	20	0	2	2	2	1	0	0	0	0
2008–09	BK Mladá Boleslav	CZE U18	42	28	21	49	18	2	1	0	1	2
2009–10	BK Mladá Boleslav	CZE U18	46	34	24	58	46	2	1	1	2	2
2009–10	BK Mladá Boleslav	CZE U20	2	0	1	1	0	—	—	—	—	—
2010–11	BK Mladá Boleslav	CZE U18	8	3	9	12	6	—	—	—	—	—
2010–11	BK Mladá Boleslav	CZE U20	38	14	17	31	10	—	—	—	—	—
2010–11	BK Mladá Boleslav	ELH	13	1	0	1	6	—	—	—	—	—
2011–12	Gatineau Olympiques	QMJHL	50	20	44	64	30	4	1	1	2	0
2012–13	Gatineau Olympiques	QMJHL	49	20	34	54	24	10	2	2	4	8
2013–14	Färjestad BK	J20	1	0	2	2	0	—	—	—	—	—
2013–14	Färjestad BK	SHL	40	4	5	9	6	—	—	—	—	—
2013–14	VIK Västerås HK	Allsv	3	1	0	1	2	10	2	1	3	4
2014–15	BK Mladá Boleslav	ELH	22	7	3	10	10	9	2	1	3	4
2015–16	BK Mladá Boleslav	ELH	47	12	18	30	22	10	3	1	4	2
2016–17	BK Mladá Boleslav	ELH	48	17	21	38	18	5	4	1	5	6
2017–18	Chicago Wolves	AHL	50	15	33	48	8	3	0	1	1	2
2017–18	Vegas Golden Knights	NHL	10	1	2	3	0	—	—	—	—	—
2018–19	Chicago Wolves	AHL	43	16	24	40	10	22	3	12	15	6
2018–19	Vegas Golden Knights	NHL	17	1	3	4	2	—	—	—	—	—
2019–20	Traktor Chelyabinsk	KHL	49	17	17	34	28	—	—	—	—	—
2020–21	Traktor Chelyabinsk	KHL	59	14	35	49	14	5	0	3	3	4
2021–22	Traktor Chelyabinsk	KHL	37	11	24	35	14	15	5	7	12	6
2022–23	HC Dynamo Pardubice	ELH	31	4	20	24	6	11	2	4	6	2
2023–24	HC Dynamo Pardubice	ELH	49	16	29	45	12	16	0	6	6	2
2024–25	HC Sparta Praha	ELH	41	11	23	34	20	12	3	7	10	0
2025–26	HC Sparta Praha	ELH	46	7	15	22	16	19	1	3	4	16
ELH totals			297	75	129	204	110	83	15	23	38	32
NHL totals			27	2	5	7	2	—	—	—	—	—
KHL totals			145	42	76	118	56	20	5	10	15	10

=== International ===
Year	Team	Event	Result	GP	G	A	Pts	PIM
2010	Czech Republic	U17	9th	5	1	0	1	2
2010	Czech Republic	IH18	4th	5	2
2011	Czech Republic	WJC18	8th	6	1	1	2	0
2012	Czech Republic	WJC	5th	5	0	2	2	4
2013	Czech Republic	WJC	5th	6	3	2	5	2
2017	Czech Republic	WC	7th	4	0	0	0	0
2018	Czech Republic	WC	7th	8	3	3	6	2
2022	Czech Republic	OG	9th	4	1	0	1	2
Junior totals				22	5	5	10	8
Senior totals				16	4	3	7	4

== Awards and honours ==
Award	Year
QMJHL
CHL Top Prospects Game	2012
