= Maxim Shalunov =

Russian ice hockey player

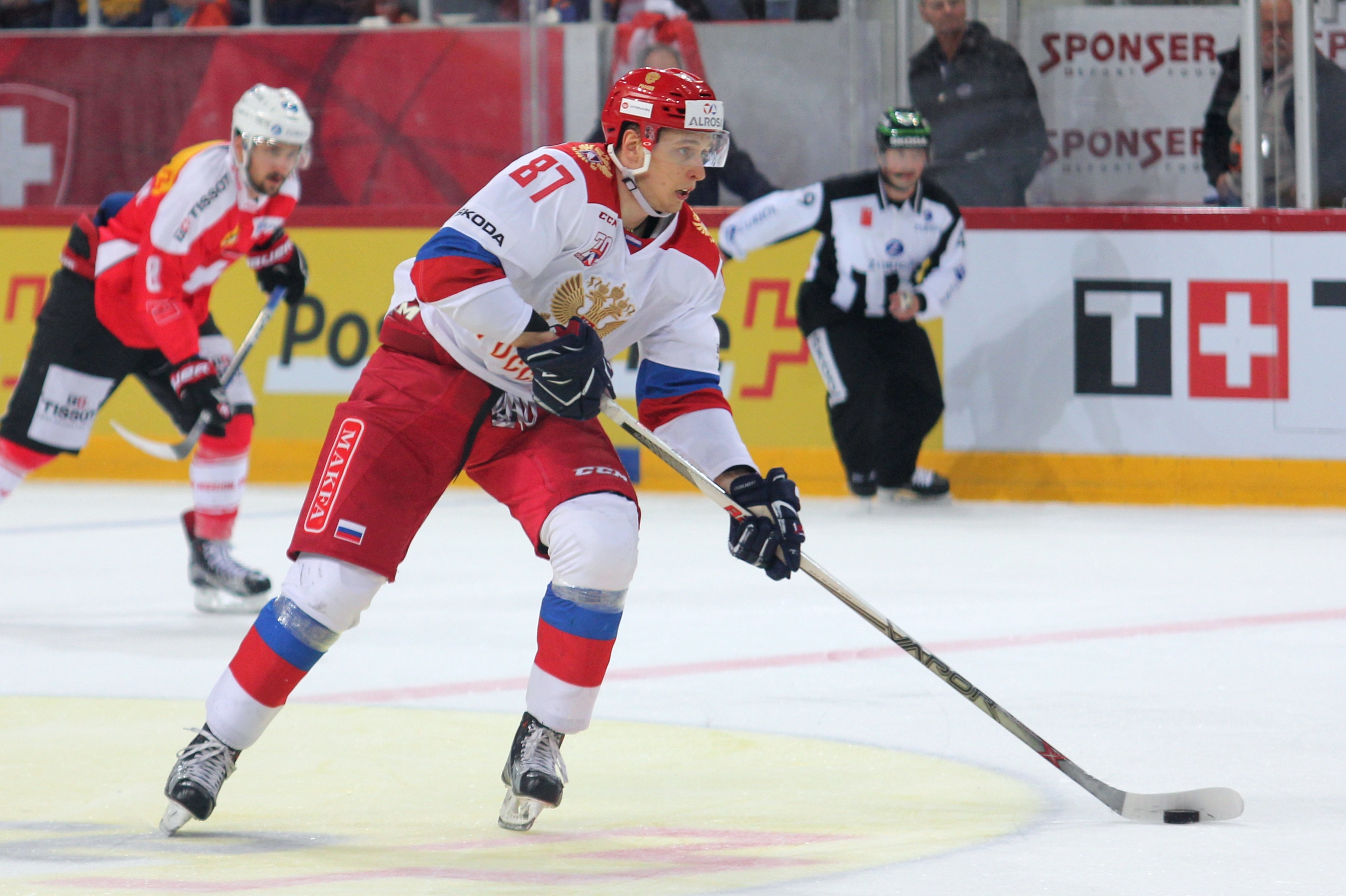
- Born: 31 January 1993 (age 33) Chelyabinsk, Russia
- Height: 6 ft 4 in (193 cm)
- Weight: 224 lb (102 kg; 16 st 0 lb)
- Position: Centre
- Shoots: Left
- KHL team Former teams: Lokomotiv Yaroslavl; Traktor Chelyabinsk; Rockford IceHogs; Sibir Novosibirsk; CSKA Moscow
- National team: Russia
- NHL draft: 109th overall, 2011; Chicago Blackhawks
- Playing career: 2010–present

Maxim Valeryevich Shalunov (Russian: Максим Валерьевич Шалунов) (born 31 January 1993) is a Russian professional ice hockey player with Lokomotiv Yaroslavl of the Kontinental Hockey League (KHL). Shalunov was selected in the 4th round (109th overall) by the Chicago Blackhawks in the 2011 NHL entry draft. He was born in Chelyabinsk, Russia.

== Playing career ==
Shalunov grew up playing youth hockey in Russia, starting his career in Traktor Chelyabinsk's academy.

During the 2010–11 MHL season, Shalunov played with the Belye Medvedi, Traktor's Junior Hockey League (MHL) affiliate. He also played six games with Traktor in the KHL during the 2010–11 KHL season.

After being drafted by the Blackhawks, Shalunov returned to Russia and played the 2011–12 MHL season with Belye Medvedi. During the 2012-2013 season, Shalunov's time was divided between Belye Medvedi as well as Traktor's VHL team, Chelmet Chelyabinsk. He also played one game with Traktor.

Shalunov played in North America during the 2013–14 season, on an AHL contract with the Rockford IceHogs, the Blackhawks' American Hockey League affiliate. After registering four assists in twenty games with Rockford, Shalunov was assigned to the Toledo Walleye, the Blackhawks' ECHL affiliate where he contributed with 18 goals and 34 points in 43 games.

On July 28, 2014, Shalunov returned to his native Russia, signing a one-year contract with HC Sibir Novosibirsk of the KHL.

After the 2016–17 season, his third year with Novosibirsk, Shalunov was traded along with Sergei Shumakov and Konstantin Okulov to HC CSKA Moscow in exchange for Alexander Sharov and financial compensation on the opening day of free agency on May 1, 2017.

Shalunov left CSKA after four seasons with the club, signing as a free agent to a three-year contract with Lokomotiv Yaroslavl on 9 August 2021. On June 10, 2024, he signed a two-year extension with Lokomotiv.

Shalunov was invited to the 2017, 2022 and 2023 editions of the KHL All-Star Game.

In Game 5 of the 2025 Gagarin Cup Finals, Shalunov scored the series-winning overtime goal.

== Personal life ==
Shalunov and his wife, Liliya Chasovitina, have a daughter, Alisia, who was born in 2017.

== Career statistics ==
=== Regular season and playoffs ===
			Regular season					Playoffs
Season	Team	League	GP	G	A	Pts	PIM	GP	G	A	Pts	PIM
2009–10	Belye Medvedi Chelyabinsk	MHL	3	2	3	5	12	4	6	1	7	6
2010–11	Belye Medvedi Chelyabinsk	MHL	39	22	14	36	42	5	1	6	7	2
2010–11	Traktor Chelyabinsk	KHL	6	0	1	1	0	—	—	—	—	—
2011–12	Belye Medvedi Chelyabinsk	MHL	48	30	30	60	60	6	3	5	8	8
2012–13	Belye Medvedi Chelyabinsk	MHL	7	3	7	10	6	—	—	—	—	—
2012–13	Chelmet Chelyabinsk	VHL	19	2	7	9	10	3	0	0	0	2
2012–13	Traktor Chelyabinsk	KHL	1	0	0	0	0	—	—	—	—	—
2013–14	Rockford IceHogs	AHL	20	0	4	4	8	—	—	—	—	—
2013–14	Toledo Walleye	ECHL	43	18	16	34	19	—	—	—	—	—
2014–15	Sibir Novosibirsk	KHL	33	1	3	4	8	16	4	1	5	4
2014–15	Yermak Angarsk	VHL	6	0	3	3	6	—	—	—	—	—
2015–16	Sibir Novosibirsk	KHL	59	18	12	30	32	10	2	4	6	8
2016–17	Sibir Novosibirsk	KHL	49	19	18	37	26	—	—	—	—	—
2017–18	CSKA Moscow	KHL	46	20	20	40	24	17	3	2	5	2
2018–19	CSKA Moscow	KHL	55	14	11	25	34	20	3	7	10	10
2019–20	CSKA Moscow	KHL	54	11	14	25	26	4	1	1	2	0
2020–21	CSKA Moscow	KHL	52	18	17	35	26	22	12	6	18	37
2021–22	Lokomotiv Yaroslavl	KHL	32	8	7	15	10	4	2	0	2	2
2022–23	Lokomotiv Yaroslavl	KHL	62	29	13	42	26	12	1	6	7	2
2023–24	Lokomotiv Yaroslavl	KHL	68	17	19	36	28	17	5	1	6	0
2024–25	Lokomotiv Yaroslavl	KHL	60	18	19	37	25	21	6	7	13	4
2025–26	Lokomotiv Yaroslavl	KHL	67	30	12	42	22	22	8	6	14	0
KHL totals			644	206	163	369	287	165	47	41	88	69

Medal record

Representing Russia

Ice hockey

World Junior Championships
Bronze medal – third place	2013 Russia	

IIHF World U18 Championship
Bronze medal – third place	2010 Belarus	

=== International ===
Year	Team	Event	Result	GP	G	A	Pts	PIM
2010	Russia	U17	4th	6	1	2	3	10
2010	Russia	IH18	5th	4	2	1	3	0
2010	Russia	U18	4th	7	3	1	4	31
2011	Russia	U18	3rd place, bronze medalist(s)	6	2	1	3	0
2013	Russia	WJC	3rd place, bronze medalist(s)	6	0	2	2	6
2018	Russia	WC	6th	8	3	3	6	4
2021	ROC	WC	5th	6	1	0	1	2
Junior totals				29	8	7	15	47
Senior totals				14	4	3	7	6

== Awards and honors ==
Award	Year
KHL
All-Star Game	2017, 2022, 2023
Gagarin Cup (CSKA Moscow)	2019
Gagarin Cup (Lokomotiv Yaroslavl)	2025, 2026
