= Nykopp =

Nykopp is a Finnish surname. Notable people with the surname include:

- Aino Nykopp-Koski (born 1950), Finnish serial killer
- Johan Nykopp (1906–1993), Finnish diplomat
- Thomas Nykopp (born 1993), Finnish ice hockey player
