= Cole Bardreau =

American professional ice hockey forward (born 1993)

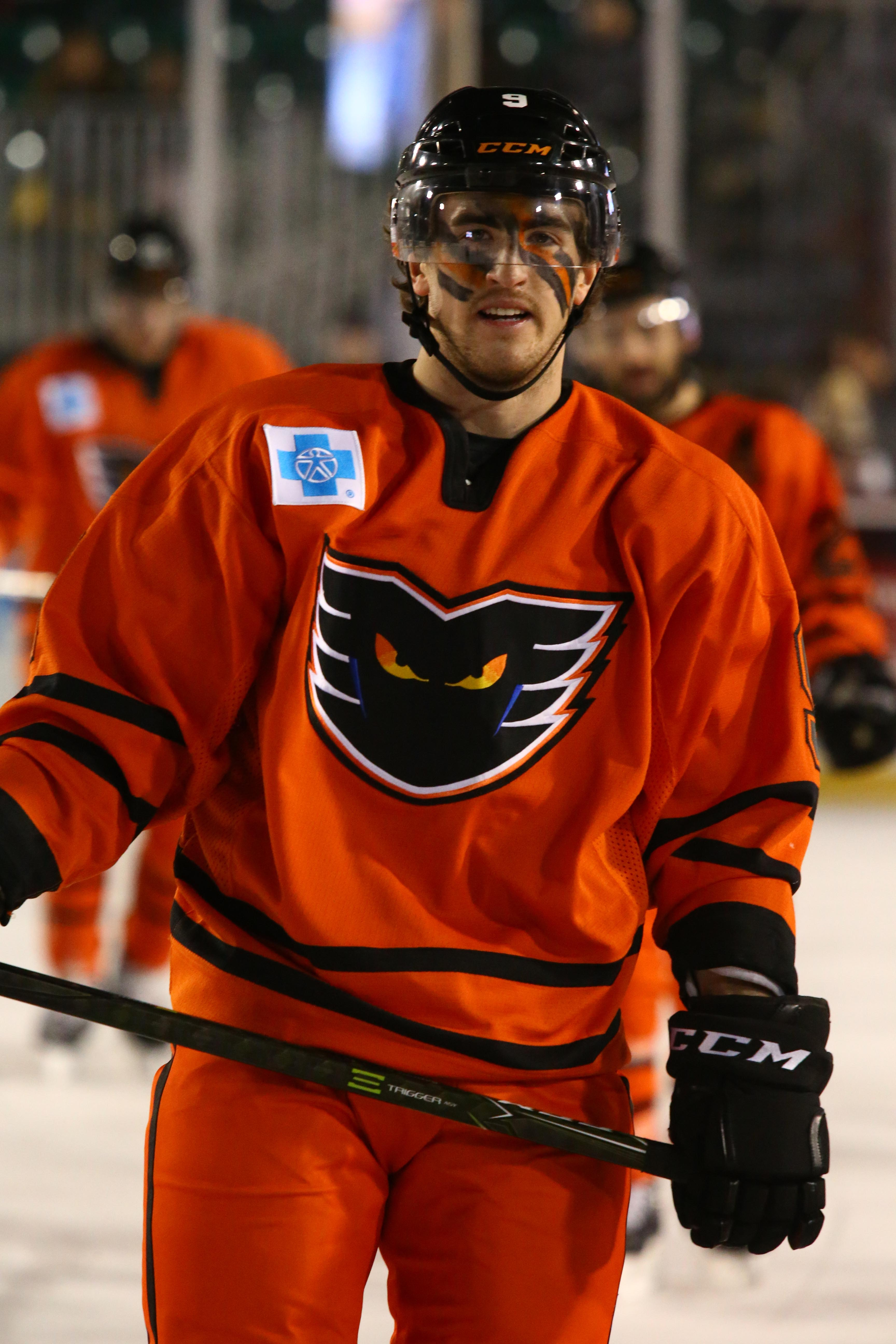
- Bardreau with the Lehigh Valley Phantoms in 2018
- Born: July 22, 1993 (age 33) Fairport, New York, U.S.
- Height: 5 ft 11 in (180 cm)
- Weight: 182 lb (83 kg; 13 st 0 lb)
- Position: Center
- Shoots: Right
- ICEHL team Former teams: HC Pustertal; New York Islanders
- NHL draft: Undrafted
- Playing career: 2015–present

Cole Bardreau (born July 22, 1993) is an American professional ice hockey forward for HC Pustertal Wölfe of the ICE Hockey League (ICEHL). He was originally signed as an undrafted free agent by the Philadelphia Flyers and has played for the New York Islanders of the National Hockey League (NHL).

== Playing career ==
=== Collegiate ===
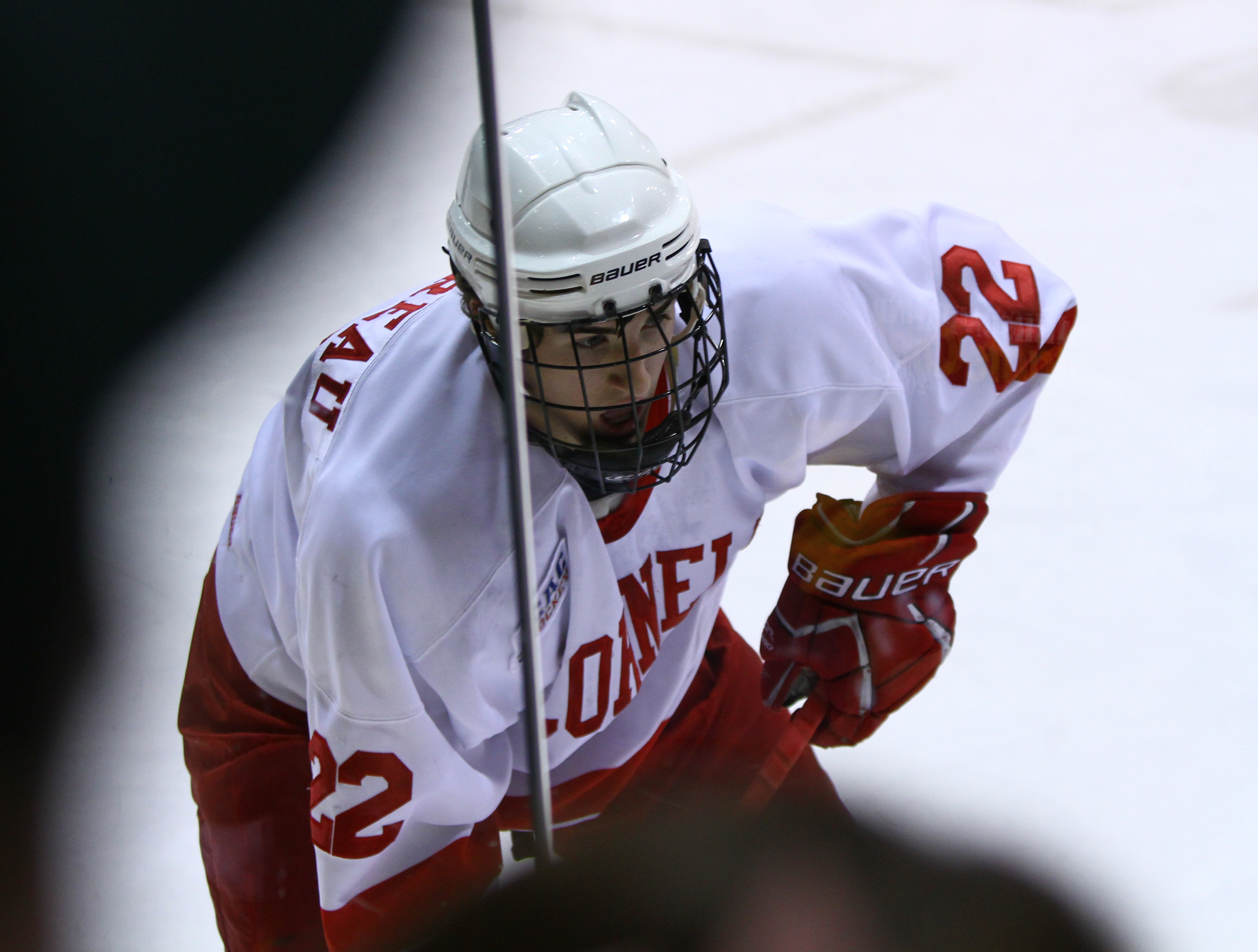
Bardeau playing for Cornell University in December 2011

While playing for the United States National Team Development Program, Bardreau committed to Cornell University.

In his sophomore season at Cornell, Bardreau was lent to Team USA to compete at the 2013 World Junior Ice Hockey Championships. Two weeks after returning from winning gold, Bardreau suffered a cervical fracture in his neck while playing at Cornell that caused him to miss the 2012–13 season and the NHL draft. Bardreau spent three months post-surgery in a neck brace with limited activity allowed before slowly being allowed to return to skating six months later. The following season, Bardreau was forced to miss some games to recover from back-to-back MCL tears but was still able to rank fourth on the team with goals.

In his last season at Cornell, Bardreau eclipsed more than 20 points for the first time in his NCAA career. He was named an NCAA (ECAC) Third All-Star Team and NCAA All-Ivy League First Team and awarded the NCAA (ECAC) Best Defensive Forward.

=== Professional ===
On March 12, 2015, he was signed as an undrafted free agent by the Philadelphia Flyers of the NHL and played the rest of the 2014–15 season with their American Hockey League affiliate, the Lehigh Valley Phantoms.

The 2015–16 season was Bardreau's first full season in the AHL. Bardreau was forced to miss most of October and November due to an arm and knee injury. Bardreau was named CCM/AHL Rookie of the Month for the month of January after he scored 12 points in 11 games played in January.

"The main thing with Cole is that he is tenacious," Gordon said. "When you are a pro, it means you can replicate the same process, not just here and there but with consistency. He takes pride in playing sound defense, killing penalties, finishing checks, winning puck battles; all those work ethic things we talk about. He has some skill, too, but the things he does that set him apart are in details."

— Scott Gordon on Bardreau.

After his sophomore season, Bardreau was forced to miss the Philadelphia Flyers training camp due to abdominal surgery.

On July 15, 2017, Bardreau signed a two-year, two-way contract with the Flyers. However, Bardreau broke his hand in a preseason game against the New York Islanders and started the season on injured reserve. He returned to the lineup on October 25 and recorded five points in six games.

On July 2, 2019, Bardreau signed as a free agent to a two-year, two-way contract with the New York Islanders. Bardreau's first NHL game came on October 19, 2019, when the New York Islanders were visiting Columbus, Ohio to play the Columbus Blue Jackets. In his first game Bardreau logged 8:54 over 15 shifts. His first NHL point came on October 27, 2019 in Nassau Coliseum against the Philadelphia Flyers. He received the primary assist on Ross Johnston’s goal in the first period. He recorded his first career goal on a penalty shot against the Ottawa Senators on November 5, 2019, which was the game-winning goal in a 4–1 Islanders win. On September 20, 2021, Bardreau was re-signed to a two-year contract by the Islanders. On December 1, 2022, the Islanders called Bardreau up from Bridgeport as one of two forwards to fill in for players who were out day-to day with injuries.

Following a productive 2022-23 season in which Bardreau scored a career-best 15 goals and 16 assists in 67 games — the eighth most on the team — at the conclusion of his NHL contract with the Islanders he opted to remain within the organization by signing a one-year AHL contract with the Bridgeport Islanders for the 2023–24 season on July 6, 2023.

After six seasons within the Islanders organization, Bardreau left as a free agent and opted to pursue a career abroad by signing a one-year contract with HC Pustertal of the ICE Hockey League on July 18, 2025.

== International play ==
Medal record

Representing United States

Ice hockey

World Junior Championships
Gold medal – first place	2013 Russia	

Bardreau was named an alternate captain for Team USA at the 2013 World Junior Ice Hockey Championships. Bardreau scored three points in seven games to help lead the team to a gold medal.

== Career statistics ==
=== Regular season and playoffs ===
			Regular season					Playoffs
Season	Team	League	GP	G	A	Pts	PIM	GP	G	A	Pts	PIM
2009–10	U.S. National Development Team	USHL	35	4	8	12	25	—	—	—	—	—
2010–11	U.S. National Development Team	USHL	24	4	7	11	23	—	—	—	—	—
2011–12	Cornell University	ECAC	34	4	4	8	18	—	—	—	—	—
2012–13	Cornell University	ECAC	13	2	5	7	12	—	—	—	—	—
2013–14	Cornell University	ECAC	26	7	9	16	14	—	—	—	—	—
2014–15	Cornell University	ECAC	30	5	17	22	38	—	—	—	—	—
2014–15	Lehigh Valley Phantoms	AHL	15	1	1	2	2	—	—	—	—	—
2015–16	Lehigh Valley Phantoms	AHL	54	13	17	30	54	—	—	—	—	—
2016–17	Lehigh Valley Phantoms	AHL	72	9	15	24	85	5	0	0	0	4
2017–18	Lehigh Valley Phantoms	AHL	45	11	19	30	59	13	0	3	3	34
2018–19	Lehigh Valley Phantoms	AHL	40	7	5	12	38	—	—	—	—	—
2019–20	Bridgeport Sound Tigers	AHL	38	2	2	4	25	—	—	—	—	—
2019–20	New York Islanders	NHL	10	1	1	2	6	—	—	—	—	—
2020–21	Bridgeport Sound Tigers	AHL	24	10	6	16	10	—	—	—	—	—
2021–22	Bridgeport Islanders	AHL	45	14	11	25	6	6	0	0	0	4
2022–23	Bridgeport Islanders	AHL	67	15	16	31	37	—	—	—	—	—
2022–23	New York Islanders	NHL	1	0	0	0	2	—	—	—	—	—
2023–24	Bridgeport Islanders	AHL	70	11	13	24	65	—	—	—	—	—
2024–25	Bridgeport Islanders	AHL	65	4	14	18	79	—	—	—	—	—
2025–26	HC Pustertal	ICEHL	44	16	23	39	28	13	4	5	9	18
NHL totals			11	1	1	2	8	—	—	—	—	—

=== International ===
Year	Team	Event	Result	GP	G	A	Pts	PIM
2010	United States	U17	1st place, gold medalist(s)	6	0	0	0	6
2011	United States	U18	1st place, gold medalist(s)	6	0	0	0	4
2013	United States	WJC	1st place, gold medalist(s)	7	1	2	3	4
Junior totals				20	1	2	3	14
