= Mikael Wikstrand =

Swedish ice hockey player (born 1993)

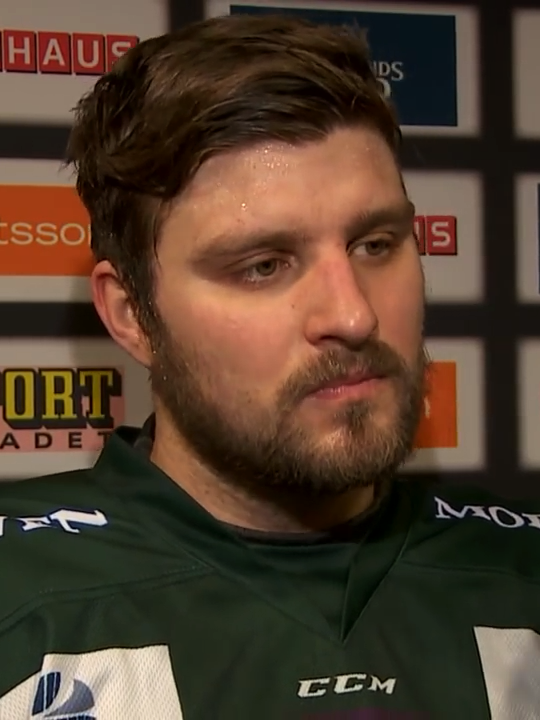
- Wikstrand with Färjestad BK in 2019
- Born: 5 November 1993 (age 32) Karlstad, Sweden
- Height: 6 ft 1 in (185 cm)
- Weight: 183 lb (83 kg; 13 st 1 lb)
- Position: Defence
- Shot: Left
- Played for: Frölunda HC; Färjestad BK; Ak Bars Kazan
- National team: Sweden
- NHL draft: 196th overall, 2012; Ottawa Senators
- Playing career: 2010–2022

Mikael Wikstrand (surname also spelled Vikstrand; born 5 November 1993) is a Swedish former professional ice hockey defenceman who played in the Swedish Hockey League (SHL).

== Playing career ==
In 2010–11, Wikstrand made his debut in professional hockey, playing 28 games for Mora IK of the HockeyAllsvenskan, getting one assist. The following year, Wikstrand played 47 games for the club, getting 3 points.

Wikstrand was ranked 23rd amongst European skaters in the 2012 NHL Central Scouting Bureau’s final rankings, however he was selected in the seventh round of the 2012 NHL entry draft by the Senators, 196th overall.

In 2012–13, Wikstrand played 45 games for Mora, getting 22 points. That year, he tied for fifth among Allsvenskan defensemen in scoring, and lead all the Mora defensemen in scoring. There were several trade rumours surrounding Wikstrand at the time, with Frölunda being particularly mentioned.

In 2014, Wikstrand signed a three-year entry-level contract with Ottawa. He attended the Ottawa Senators training camp, but played the season in Sweden with Frölunda HC on loan from Ottawa.

Wikstrand caused controversy when he left the Ottawa Senators’ 2015 pre-season camp without permission, informing team officials only once he was already at the airport preparing to return to Sweden. Senators general manager Bryan Murray announced shortly afterward that Wikstrand had been suspended by the team. Since Wikstrand is under contract with the Senators, the NHL's affiliation with the IIHF meant that he was prohibited from playing professional hockey for Färjestad BK or any other club in a league affiliated with the IIHF.

On January 20, 2016, the Ottawa Senators announced an agreement allowing Wikstrand to play professionally in Sweden while the team retained his North American rights. He was loaned to Färjestad of the SHL, enabling him to continue his career while remaining in Karlstad, where his brother was reportedly undergoing treatment for leukemia.

After Captaining Färjestad in the 2018–19 season, his fourth year with the club, Wikstrand left as a free agent in the off-season. He agreed to a two-year contract with Russian club, Ak Bars Kazan of the Kontinental Hockey League (KHL), on 13 June 2019.

At the conclusion of his contract with Ak Bars, appearing as a regular on the blueline, Wikstrand opted to return to former club, Färjestad BK, as a free agent by agreeing to a three-year contract to resume his career in the SHL on 3 May 2021.

After winning the Le Mat Trophy with Färjestad BK in the 2021–22 season, Wikstrand missed the following two seasons through injury before announcing his retirement from professional hockey on 24 April 2024.

== International play ==
Medal record

Representing Sweden

Ice hockey

World Championships
Gold medal – first place	2018 Denmark	

World Junior Championships
Silver medal – second place	2013 Russia	

Wikstrand has represented Sweden at the 2018 Winter Olympics, the 2011 U18 World Junior Championship, as well as at the 2013 World Junior Championship, leading all Swedish defensemen with 4 points.

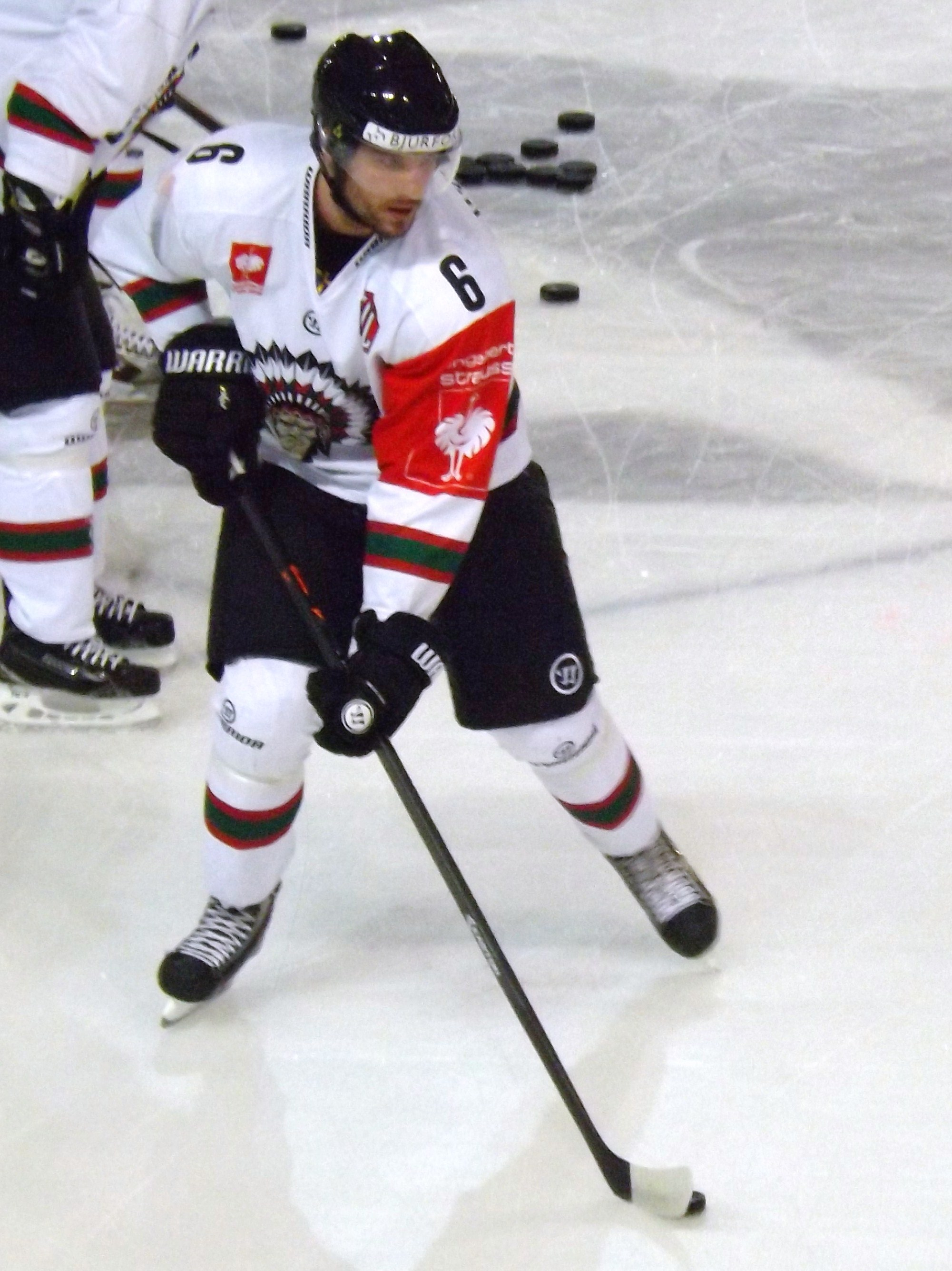
Wikstrand with Frölunda HC in 2014

== Career statistics ==
=== Regular season and playoffs ===
			Regular season					Playoffs
Season	Team	League	GP	G	A	Pts	PIM	GP	G	A	Pts	PIM
2008–09	IFK Ore	J18	9	0	2	2	31	—	—	—	—	—
2008–09	IFK Ore	SWE.5	3	0	0	0		—	—	—	—	—
2009–10	Mora IK	J18	17	7	10	17	18	—	—	—	—	—
2009–10	Mora IK	J18 Allsv	6	3	1	4	8	—	—	—	—	—
2009–10	Mora IK	J20	14	1	2	3	8	—	—	—	—	—
2010–11	Mora IK	J18	4	1	2	3	6	3	1	3	4	4
2010–11	Mora IK	J20	16	3	5	8	6	—	—	—	—	—
2010–11	Mora IK	Allsv	28	0	1	1	6	8	0	0	0	2
2011–12	Mora IK	J20	11	3	4	7	2	—	—	—	—	—
2011–12	Mora IK	Allsv	47	2	1	3	14	—	—	—	—	—
2012–13	Mora IK	J20	2	0	1	1	0	—	—	—	—	—
2012–13	Mora IK	Allsv	45	11	14	25	35	—	—	—	—	—
2013–14	Mora IK	Allsv	27	4	16	20	14	—	—	—	—	—
2013–14	Frölunda HC	SHL	19	4	7	11	4	7	1	1	2	0
2014–15	Frölunda HC	SHL	46	5	15	20	10	13	0	5	5	8
2015–16	Färjestad BK	SHL	17	1	8	9	6	5	0	3	3	0
2016–17	Färjestad BK	SHL	48	4	15	19	12	7	2	3	5	2
2017–18	Färjestad BK	SHL	45	5	13	18	14	6	1	0	1	0
2018–19	Färjestad BK	SHL	47	4	16	20	14	14	0	2	2	6
2019–20	Ak Bars Kazan	KHL	52	4	28	32	8	4	0	2	2	0
2020–21	Ak Bars Kazan	KHL	39	2	11	13	10	9	0	1	1	2
2021–22	Färjestad BK	SHL	48	3	13	16	20	8	1	1	2	6
SHL totals			270	26	87	113	80	60	5	15	20	22
KHL totals			91	6	39	45	18	13	0	3	3	2

=== International ===
Year	Team	Event	Result	GP	G	A	Pts	PIM
2011	Sweden	WJC18	2nd place, silver medalist(s)	6	0	1	1	8
2013	Sweden	WJC	2nd place, silver medalist(s)	6	0	4	4	4
2018	Sweden	OG	5th	4	2	1	3	0
2018	Sweden	WC	1st place, gold medalist(s)	10	0	1	1	2
Junior totals				12	0	5	5	12
Senior totals				14	2	2	4	2

== Awards and honours ==
Award	Year
SHL
Le Mat Trophy (Färjestad BK)	2022
