= Ice Palace Salavat Yulaev =

Indoor sporting arena in Ufa, Russia

Coordinates: 54°45′37″N 55°59′39″E

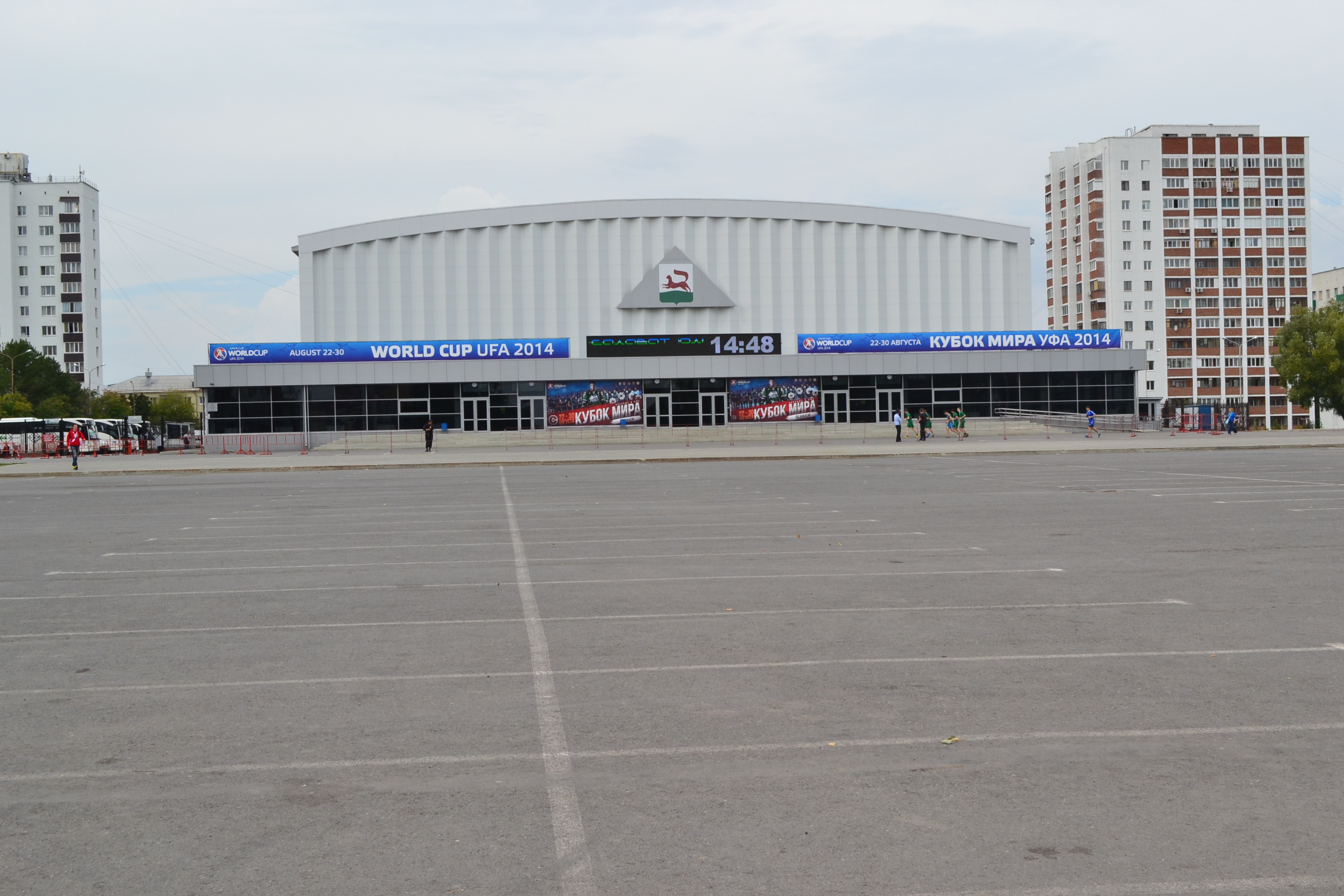
- Ice Palace Salavat Yulaev in 2012.
- Interactive map of Ice Palace Salavat Yulaev
- Location: Ufa, Russia
- Capacity: 4,043
- Field size: 61×30 m

Construction
- Opened: October 28, 1967

Tenants
- Salavat Yulaev Ufa (KHL) (1967–2007); Tolpar Ufa (MHL) (2009–present); Agidel Ufa (ZhHL) (2010–present)

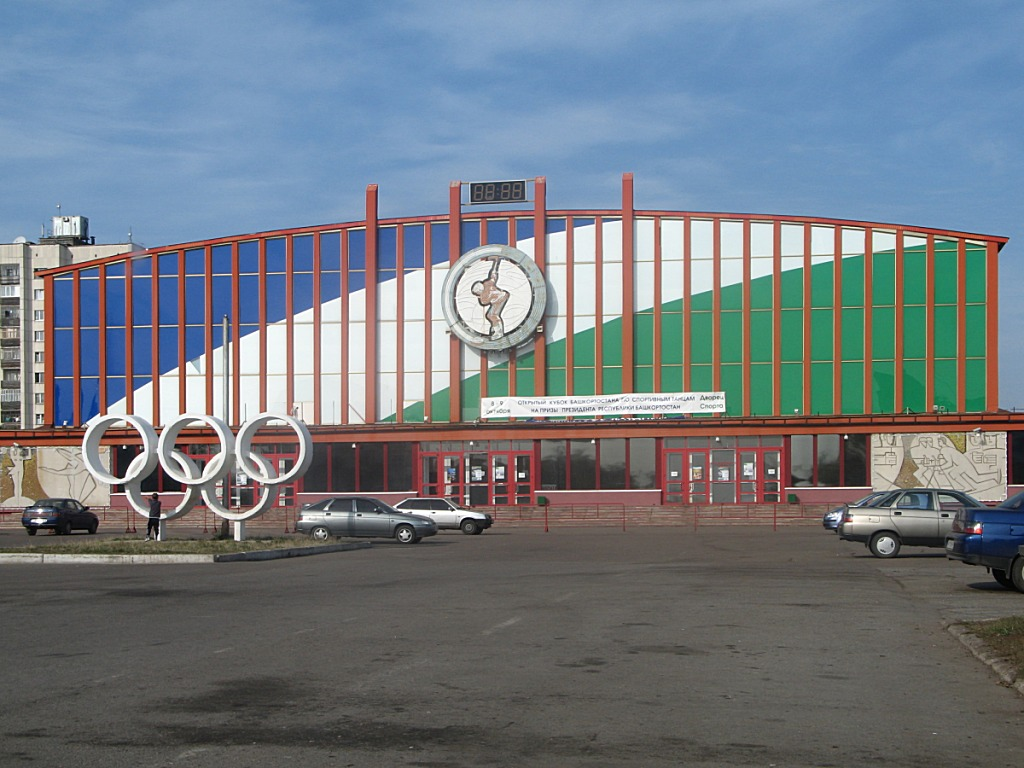
Sports Palace before reconstruction

Ice Palace Salavat Yulaev (Russian: Дворец спорта Салават Юлаев, romanized: Dvorets sporta Salavat Yulayev) is an indoor sporting arena located in Ufa, Russia. The capacity of the arena is 4,043. It was the home arena of the Salavat Yulaev Ufa ice hockey team. It was replaced by Ufa Arena in 2007.

Along with Ufa Arena, Ice Palace Salavat Yulaev played host to games in the 2013 World Junior Ice Hockey Championships taking place between December 26, 2012 and January 5, 2013.
