= Emil Djuse =

Swedish ice hockey player (born 1993)

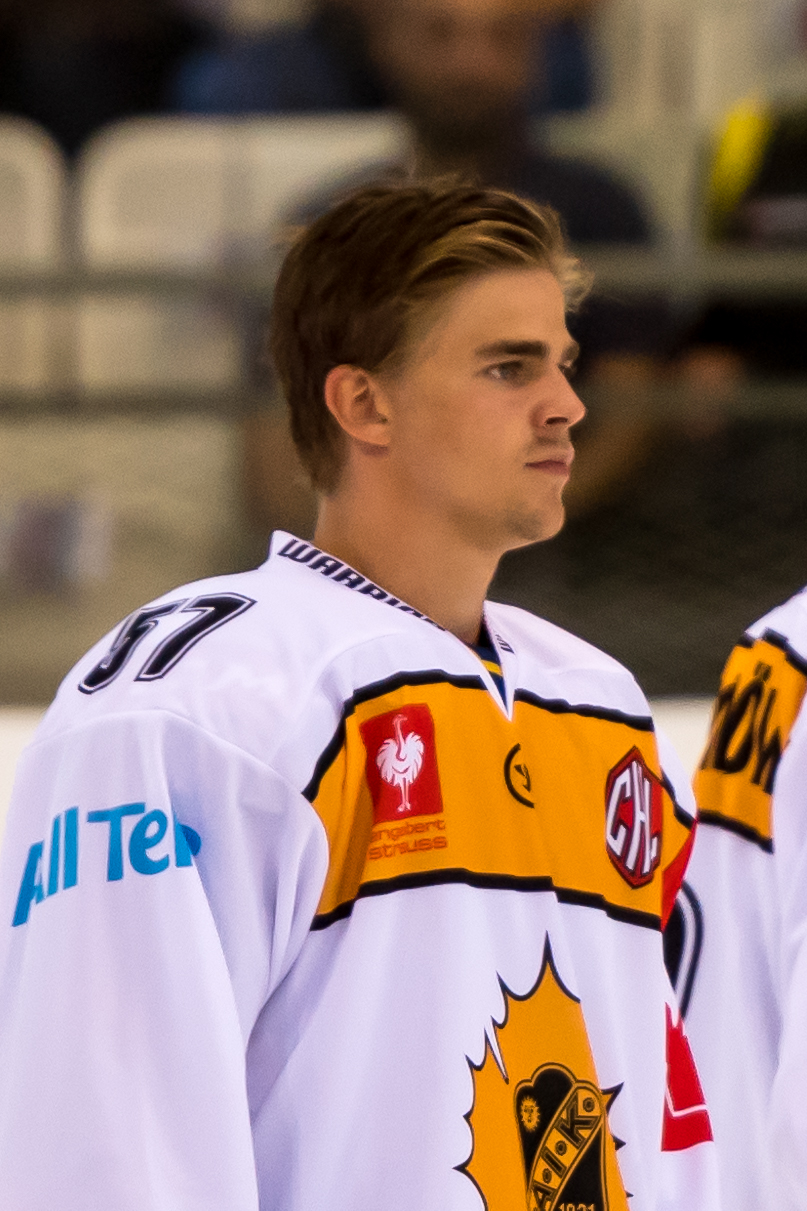
- Djuse with Skellefteå AIK in 2016
- Born: October 27, 1993 (age 32) Östersund, Sweden
- Height: 5 ft 11 in (180 cm)
- Weight: 190 lb (86 kg; 13 st 8 lb)
- Position: Defence
- Shoots: Left
- SHL team Former teams: Skellefteå AIK; Frölunda HC; Modo Hockey; Spartak Moscow; SC Rapperswil-Jona Lakers
- National team: Sweden
- NHL draft: Undrafted
- Playing career: 2013–present

Emil Djuse (born October 27, 1993) is a Swedish professional ice hockey defenceman currently playing for Skellefteå AIK in the Swedish Hockey League (SHL). He has formerly played with Frölunda HC and Modo Hockey.

== Playing career ==
During the 2015–16 season Djuse appeared in a career high 46 games with Modo Hockey, establishing new marks of 11 assists and 15 points. He was assigned also to play one game with Timrå IK of the HockeyAllsvenskan on loan from Modo. Upon relegation to the Allsvenskan for Modo, Djuse left the club to sign a two-year contract to remain in the SHL with Skellefteå AIK on May 19, 2016.

On April 29, 2019, Djuse signed a one-year, entry-level contract with the Dallas Stars of the National Hockey League (NHL). After attending the Stars' 2019 training camp, Djuse was assigned to begin the 2019–20 season, his first in North America, with AHL affiliate the Texas Stars. Earning a top-pairing role within Texas' blueline, Djuse registered 4 goals and 29 points through 48 games.

On 24 February 2020, at the NHL trade deadline, Djuse was traded by the Dallas Stars to the Florida Panthers in exchange for a sixth-round draft pick in 2020. He was immediately assigned to join the Panthers' AHL affiliate, the Springfield Thunderbirds. Djuse registered 3 points in 5 games with the Panthers' AHL affiliate, the Springfield Thunderbirds, before the season was cancelled due to COVID-19.

As an impending restricted free agent with the Panthers, Djuse opted to conclude his North American career by signing a one-year contract with Russian club HC Spartak Moscow of the Kontinental Hockey League (KHL), on 18 June 2020. In his lone season with Spartak, Djuse compiled 6 goals and 28 points through 45 regular season games of the 2020–21 season.

Leaving Russia as a free agent, Djuse signed a two-year contract in Switzerland, agreeing to terms with SC Rapperswil-Jona Lakers of the National League (NL) on May 26, 2021.

Djuse remained in Switzerland with the Lakers for four seasons, before returning to the SHL on a three-year contract for a second stint with Skellefteå AIK on 23 April 2025.

== International play ==
Djuse represented the Swedish national junior team at the 2013 World Junior Ice Hockey Championships, winning a silver medal.

== Career statistics ==
=== Regular season and playoffs ===
			Regular season					Playoffs
Season	Team	League	GP	G	A	Pts	PIM	GP	G	A	Pts	PIM
2009–10	Östersunds IK	Div. 1	13	0	1	1	4	—	—	—	—	—
2010–11	Östersunds IK	Div. 1	31	4	12	16	10	—	—	—	—	—
2011–12	Östersunds IK	Div. 1	35	8	31	39	26	6	1	0	1	4
2012–13	Södertälje SK	Allsv	35	3	10	13	10	8	1	1	2	37
2013–14	Frölunda HC	J20	3	0	1	1	0	—	—	—	—	—
2013–14	Frölunda HC	SHL	18	0	5	5	6	—	—	—	—	—
2013–14	Malmö Redhawks	Allsv	3	0	0	0	2	—	—	—	—	—
2013–14	Mora IK	Allsv	23	2	7	9	20	6	0	3	3	4
2014–15	Frölunda HC	J20	1	0	1	1	0	—	—	—	—	—
2014–15	Frölunda HC	SHL	14	0	1	1	0	—	—	—	—	—
2014–15	Modo Hockey	SHL	24	4	4	8	12	—	—	—	—	—
2015–16	Modo Hockey	SHL	46	4	11	15	4	—	—	—	—	—
2015–16	Timrå IK	Allsv	1	1	1	2	0	—	—	—	—	—
2016–17	Skellefteå AIK	SHL	50	4	9	13	59	7	0	1	1	4
2017–18	Skellefteå AIK	SHL	50	3	18	21	32	7	0	1	1	12
2018–19	Skellefteå AIK	SHL	49	6	16	22	45	6	0	2	2	4
2019–20	Texas Stars	AHL	48	4	25	29	26	—	—	—	—	—
2019–20	Springfield Thunderbirds	AHL	5	1	2	3	2	—	—	—	—	—
2020–21	Spartak Moscow	KHL	45	6	22	28	14	4	0	0	0	0
2021–22	SC Rapperswil-Jona Lakers	NL	48	7	21	28	37	7	0	3	3	4
2022–23	SC Rapperswil-Jona Lakers	NL	38	6	16	22	30	1	0	0	0	0
2023–24	SC Rapperswil-Jona Lakers	NL	35	6	5	11	28	—	—	—	—	—
2024–25	SC Rapperswil-Jona Lakers	NL	21	0	7	7	46	2	0	0	0	0
SHL totals			251	21	64	85	158	20	0	4	4	20
NL totals			142	19	49	68	141	10	0	3	3	4

Medal record

Ice hockey

Representing Sweden

World Junior Championships
Silver medal – second place	2013 Ufa	

=== International ===
Year	Team	Event	Result	GP	G	A	Pts	PIM
2013	Sweden	WJC	2nd place, silver medalist(s)	6	1	1	2	2
Junior totals				6	1	1	2	2
