= Ivars Punnenovs =

Latvian ice hockey player

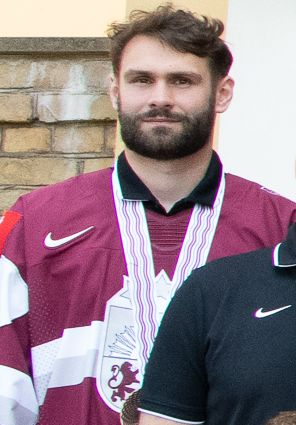
- Punnenovs in 2023
- Born: May 30, 1994 (age 32) Riga, Latvia
- Height: 6 ft 1 in (185 cm)
- Weight: 201 lb (91 kg; 14 st 5 lb)
- Position: Goaltender
- Shoots: Left
- NL team Former teams: SC Rapperswil-Jona Lakers; SCL Tigers; Lausanne HC
- National team: Latvia
- Playing career: 2013–present

Ivars Punnenovs (born May 30, 1994) is a Latvian professional ice hockey player who is a goaltender for SC Rapperswil-Jona Lakers of the National League (NL).

== Playing career ==
Punnenovs began his career in 2013–14 as the backup goalie of Rapperswil-Jona Lakers behind David Aebischer. He made his National League A debut on September 27, 2013.

== International play ==
Medal record

Representing Latvia

Ice hockey

World Championships
Bronze medal – third place	2023 Finland/Latvia	

Punnenovs participated at the 2013 World Junior Ice Hockey Championships as a member of the Latvia men's national junior ice hockey team.

He represented Latvia at the 2023 IIHF World Championship where he won a bronze medal, Latvia's first ever IIHF World Championship medal. Punnenovs only played in Latvia's match against Canada, allowing two goals before being replaced by Artūrs Šilovs.
