= Matúš Matis =

Slovak ice hockey winger

- Born: May 12, 1993 (age 32) Košice, Slovakia
- Height: 6 ft 0 in (183 cm)
- Weight: 201 lb (91 kg; 14 st 5 lb)
- Position: Winger
- Shoots: Right
- team Former teams: HK STEEL TEAM Trebišov; Bradford Rattlers; Chicoutimi Saguenéens; Michigan Warriors; HC Košice; HK Orange 20; HC 46 Bardejov; HK Poprad; Kalix UHC; MsHK Žilina; HKM Zvolen; Aigles de Nice
- Playing career: 2012–present

Matúš Matis (born May 12, 1993) is a Slovak professional ice hockey player. He currently plays in HK STEEL TEAM Trebišov.

== Career ==
Matis previously played for HC Košice, MsHK Žilina and HKm Zvolen. He also played in the Ligue Magnus for Aigles de Nice, having signed for the team on June 5, 2018. Matis signed for Lions de Lyons on May 16, 2019 but would be released without ever playing for the team. He instead signed for HK Poprad on September 24, 2019.

Matis also played for the Chicoutimi Saguenéens of the Quebec Major Junior Hockey League during the 2010–11 season before turning professional.

== Career statistics ==
=== Regular season and playoffs ===
			Regular season					Playoffs
Season	Team	League	GP	G	A	Pts	PIM	GP	G	A	Pts	PIM
2009–10	Bradford Rattlers	GMHL	41	26	19	45	72	8	0	6	6	10
2010–11	Chicoutimi Saguenéens	QMJHL	33	3	0	3	20	—	—	—	—	—
2010–11	Bradford Rattlers	GMHL	12	14	7	21	24	10	8	13	21	30
2011–12	Michigan Warriors	NAHL	50	15	5	20	57	—	—	—	—	—
2012–13	HC Košice	Slovak	19	1	5	6	26	13	0	1	1	8
2012–13	HK Orange 20	Slovak	11	0	3	3	18	—	—	—	—	—
2013–14	HC Košice	Slovak	20	0	1	1	4	—	—	—	—	—
2013–14	HC 46 Bardejov	Slovak.1	28	8	9	17	34	13	4	3	7	12
2014–15	HK Poprad	Slovak	52	9	10	19	16	12	2	3	5	2
2015–16	Kalix UHC	Division 1	24	7	7	14	8	—	—	—	—	—
2016–17	MsHK Žilina	Slovak	38	8	5	13	14	—	—	—	—	—
2016–17	HKM Zvolen	Slovak	12	1	0	1	4	7	0	0	0	2
2017–18	HKM Zvolen	Slovak	52	9	10	19	20	10	0	0	0	4
2018–19	Nice hockey Côte d'Azur	French	43	17	17	34	26	4	0	0	0	4
2019–20	HK Poprad	Slovak	6	0	0	0	4	—	—	—	—	—
Slovak totals			210	28	34	62	106	49	2	4	6	18

=== International ===
Year	Team	Event	Result	GP	G	A	Pts	PIM
2013	Slovakia	WJC	8th	6	3	2	5	16
Junior totals				6	3	2	5	16
