= Alexander Khokhlachev =

Russian ice hockey player (born 1993)

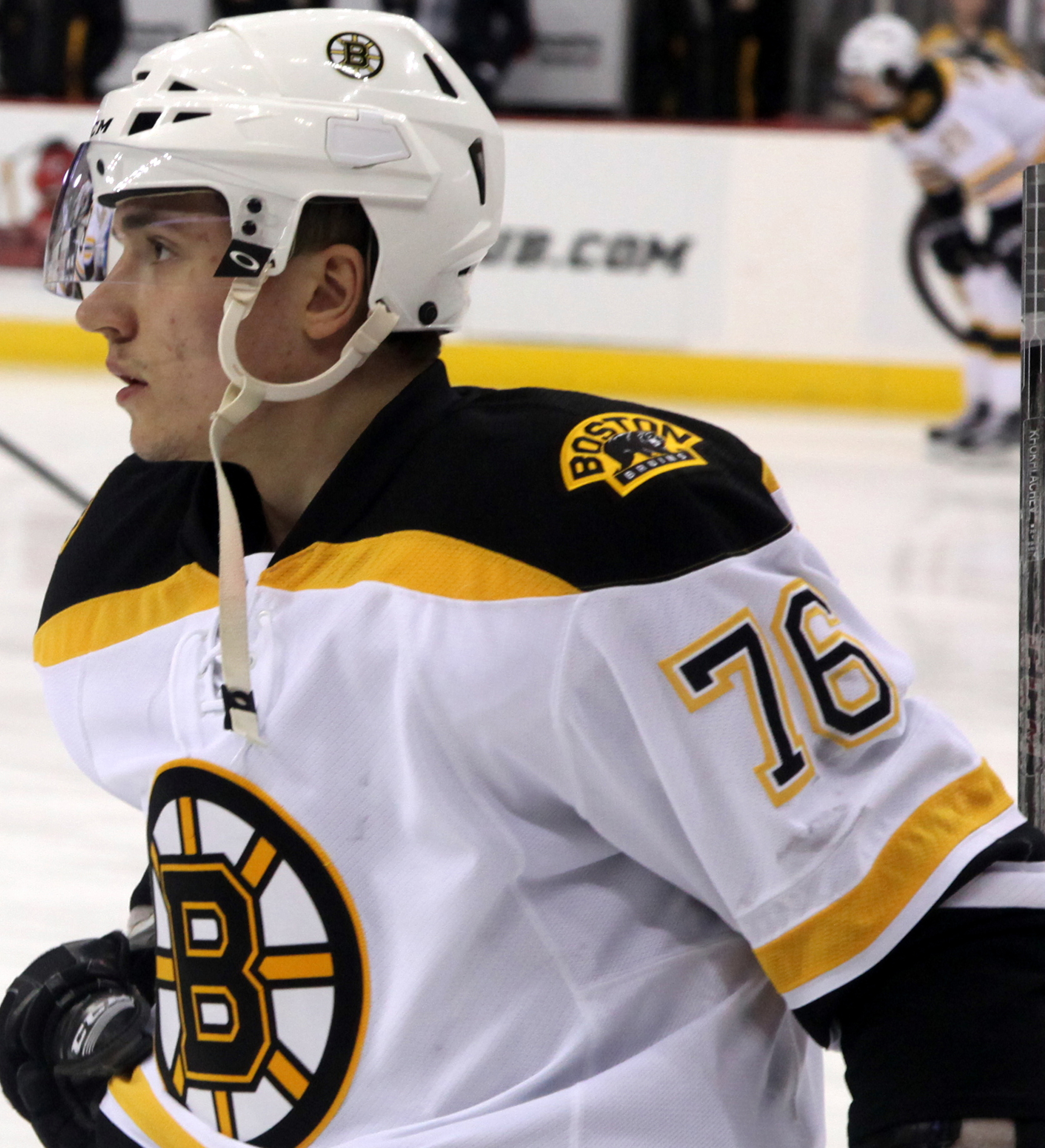
- Khokhlachev as a member of the Boston Bruins.
- Born: September 9, 1993 (age 33) Moscow, Russia
- Height: 5 ft 11 in (180 cm)
- Weight: 184 lb (83 kg; 13 st 2 lb)
- Position: Centre
- Shoots: Left
- KHL team Former teams: HC Sochi; Spartak Moscow; Boston Bruins; SKA Saint Petersburg; Avangard Omsk; Amur Khabarovsk; Lada Togliatti; Salavat Yulaev Ufa
- NHL draft: 40th overall, 2011; Boston Bruins
- Playing career: 2010–present

Alexander Igorevich Khokhlachev (US pronunciation: KOH-klah-chawv; Russian: Александр Игоревич Хохлачёв; born September 9, 1993) is a Russian professional ice hockey forward who is currently playing for HC Sochi in the Kontinental Hockey League (KHL). He was selected by the Boston Bruins, 40th overall, in the 2011 NHL entry draft.

== Playing career ==
Khokhlachev played in the 2006 Quebec International Pee-Wee Hockey Tournament with the Moscow Selects youth team. He was selected 23rd overall in the 2010 Canadian Hockey League Import Draft by the Windsor Spitfires. After finishing the 2009–10 season with MHK Spartak in the MHL in Russia, Khokhlachev signed with the Spitfires for the 2010–11 OHL season.

On July 1, 2012, the Boston Bruins announced they had signed Khokhlachev to an entry-level deal. Khokhlachev signed with Spartak Moscow of the Kontinental Hockey League (KHL) to start the 2012–13 season, but returned to Windsor to play for the Spitfires after just 26 games in the KHL. After 29 games in Windsor the Bruins recalled Khokhlachev to the Providence Bruins of the American Hockey League (AHL) where he finished the season.

To start the 2013–14 season Khokhlachev attended Boston Bruins training camp but was assigned to the Providence Bruins on September 20, 2013. On April 13, 2014, Khokhlachev made his NHL debut skating 15:14 with the Boston Bruins in a 3–2 loss to the New Jersey Devils. His first NHL appearance during the 2014–15 Boston Bruins season occurred on November 21, 2014, as Khokhlachev scored the shootout tiebreaker goal for a 4–3 Bruins road win over the Columbus Blue Jackets.

In May 2016, Khokhlachev reportedly left the Bruins for the Kontinental Hockey League of his native Russia - reports in the USA stated that he had signed a contract with SKA Saint Petersburg. It was later confirmed that on July 1, 2016, Khokhlachev signed a two-year deal with SKA Saint Petersburg, with his NHL rights still to be held by the Bruins.

In the 2016–17 season, Khokhlachev was limited to just 25 regular season games, hampered by injury in registering just 5 goals and 10 points. He appeared in 9 post-season games as SKA claimed the Gagarin Cup. On August 18, 2017, Khokhlachev was traded approaching his final year of contract by SKA in a return to former club, Spartak Moscow, in exchange for Yaroslav Dyblenko.

Khokhlachev played in three further seasons with Spartak before he was traded to Avangard Omsk in exchange for Sergei Shirokov prior to the 2020–21 season on 3 May 2020. He won his second Gagarin Cup with Avangard.

Before the 2021–22 season, Khokhlachev returned to Spartak. Prior to the 2022–23 season, he was traded by Spartak to Amur Khabarovsk in exchange for the prospect Artyom Gumenyuk and financial compensation on 30 August 2023. In the middle of the 2024–25 season, Khokhlachev was released from Amur and signed a contract with HC Sochi for the remainder of the season.

Before the 2025–26 season, Khokhlachev signed a one-year contract with HC Lada Togliatti. During the season, he left Lada and joined Salavat Yulaev Ufa.

On 9 June 2026, Khokhlachev returned to Sochi on a one-year contract for the 2026–27 season.

== Personal life ==
Khokhlachev's younger brother, Timofey, played college hockey in the US for American International College before joining Lada Togliatti together with Alexander. He is currently playing for Lada's farm club CSK VVS Samara. Their father, Igor, played professional hockey for two seasons in Russia.

== Career statistics ==
=== Regular season and playoffs ===
			Regular season					Playoffs
Season	Team	League	GP	G	A	Pts	PIM	GP	G	A	Pts	PIM
2009–10	MHK Spartak	MHL	51	15	25	40	22	—	—	—	—	—
2010–11	Windsor Spitfires	OHL	67	34	42	76	28	18	9	11	20	8
2011–12	Windsor Spitfires	OHL	56	25	44	69	32	—	—	—	—	—
2012–13	Spartak Moscow	KHL	26	2	5	7	20	—	—	—	—	—
2012–13	Windsor Spitfires	OHL	29	22	26	48	20	—	—	—	—	—
2012–13	Providence Bruins	AHL	11	2	1	3	8	—	—	—	—	—
2013–14	Providence Bruins	AHL	65	21	36	57	28	12	9	5	14	12
2013–14	Boston Bruins	NHL	1	0	0	0	2	—	—	—	—	—
2014–15	Providence Bruins	AHL	61	15	28	43	28	5	2	1	3	4
2014–15	Boston Bruins	NHL	3	0	0	0	0	—	—	—	—	—
2015–16	Providence Bruins	AHL	60	23	45	68	12	3	0	2	2	2
2015–16	Boston Bruins	NHL	5	0	0	0	0	—	—	—	—	—
2016–17	SKA Saint Petersburg	KHL	25	5	5	10	2	9	0	1	1	11
2017–18	Spartak Moscow	KHL	52	19	31	50	48	4	0	1	1	6
2018–19	Spartak Moscow	KHL	54	18	19	37	34	6	0	1	1	10
2019–20	Spartak Moscow	KHL	56	14	18	32	24	6	2	3	5	14
2020–21	Avangard Omsk	KHL	59	11	23	34	20	23	1	4	5	8
2021–22	Spartak Moscow	KHL	46	16	19	35	30	5	2	1	3	2
2022–23	Spartak Moscow	KHL	65	19	36	55	73	—	—	—	—	—
2023–24	Amur Khabarovsk	KHL	60	8	16	24	20	6	1	2	3	2
2024–25	Amur Khabarovsk	KHL	21	1	2	3	12	—	—	—	—	—
2024–25	HC Sochi	KHL	42	7	10	17	14	—	—	—	—	—
2025–26	Lada Togliatti	KHL	3	0	0	0	2	—	—	—	—	—
2025–26	Salavat Yulaev Ufa	KHL	33	9	6	15	12	3	0	0	0	0
KHL totals			542	129	190	319	311	62	6	13	19	53
NHL totals			9	0	0	0	2	—	—	—	—	—

Medal record

Representing Russia

Men's ice hockey

World Junior Championships
Bronze medal – third place	2013 Ufa	
Silver medal – second place	2012 Canada	

=== International ===
Year	Team	Event	Result	GP	G	A	Pts	PIM
2010	Russia	U17	4th	6	5	8	13	4
2012	Russia	WJC	2nd place, silver medalist(s)	7	4	1	5	6
2013	Russia	WJC	3rd place, bronze medalist(s)	7	3	2	5	4
Junior totals				20	12	11	23	14

== Awards and honours ==
Award	Year
AHL
All-Star Game	2015
KHL
Gagarin Cup (SKA Saint Petersburg)	2017
Gagarin Cup (Avangard Omsk)	2021
International
U17 All-Star Team	2010
