= Emil Molin =

Swedish ice hockey player (born 1993)

- Born: February 3, 1993 (age 33) Gävle, Sweden
- Height: 6 ft 0 in (183 cm)
- Weight: 179 lb (81 kg; 12 st 11 lb)
- Position: Centre
- Shoots: Left
- SL team Former teams: HC La Chaux-de-Fonds; Brynäs IF; Malmö Redhawks; KooKoo
- NHL draft: 105th overall, 2011; Dallas Stars
- Playing career: 2011–present

Emil Molin (born February 3, 1993) is a Swedish professional ice hockey player who is playing for HC La Chaux-de-Fonds of the Swiss League. He was selected by the Dallas Stars in the 4th round (105th overall) of the 2011 NHL entry draft.

== Playing career ==
Emil made his Swedish Hockey League (SHL) debut with Brynäs IF in the 2011–12 season. Molin recorded his first SHL point on December 10, 2011, an assist on a goal by Mads Hansen. He played a total of 44 games for Brynäs that season en route to claiming the Swedish championship.

On June 15, 2012, Molin was signed to a three-year entry-level contract with the Dallas Stars. He was loaned back to Sweden for three year following signing with the Stars which he spent with Brynäs, Mora IK, Almtuna IS and Rögle BK, gaining playing time in the Swedish Hockey League as well as in the HockeyAllsvenskan. He then made his way to North America to fulfill the final year of his contract for the 2015–16 campaign. He spent the entire season with Dallas' farm teams: Molin played eleven games, tallying three points for the Texas Stars in the American Hockey League and saw mostly playing time with ECHL's Idaho Steelheads. Molin appeared in 54 ECHL regular season contests, recording 22 goals and 24 assists, as well as in seven postseason games with four points.

In May 2016, Modo Hockey of the HockeyAllsvenskan announced that Molin would return to Sweden and had signed a deal with the team.

Molin played two seasons with Modo in the Allsvenskan, leading the league in scoring, before returning to the SHL before the 2018–19 season, agreeing to a two-year contract with the Malmö Redhawks on 13 April 2018.

== Personal info ==
Emil's father, Ove Molin, played professionally with Brynäs for 18 seasons.

== Career statistics ==
=== Regular season and playoffs ===
			Regular season					Playoffs
Season	Team	League	GP	G	A	Pts	PIM	GP	G	A	Pts	PIM
2010–11	Brynäs IF	J20	9	0	1	1	2	1	0	0	0	0
2011–12	Brynäs IF	J20	29	15	27	42	45	1	0	1	1	0
2011–12	Brynäs IF	SEL	34	1	4	5	0	10	0	1	1	0
2012–13	Brynäs IF	J20	15	5	6	11	37	2	0	1	1	0
2012–13	Brynäs IF	SEL	34	1	2	3	0	1	0	0	0	0
2012–13	Mora IK	Allsv	8	0	0	0	2	—	—	—	—	—
2013–14	Brynäs IF	SHL	21	0	3	3	0	—	—	—	—	—
2013–14	Almtuna IS	Allsv	1	0	0	0	0	—	—	—	—	—
2013–14	Rögle BK	Allsv	21	2	10	12	4	14	3	6	9	0
2014–15	Rögle BK	Allsv	50	0	9	9	2	10	1	3	4	0
2015–16	Idaho Steelheads	ECHL	54	22	24	46	16	7	0	4	4	6
2015–16	Texas Stars	AHL	11	0	3	3	4	—	—	—	—	—
2016–17	Modo Hockey	Allsv	52	16	22	38	14	—	—	—	—	—
2017–18	Modo Hockey	Allsv	52	23	28	51	26	—	—	—	—	—
2018–19	Malmö Redhawks	SHL	10	4	1	5	2	—	—	—	—	—
2019–20	Malmö Redhawks	SHL	10	1	2	3	2	—	—	—	—	—
2019–20	Brynäs IF	SHL	38	13	13	26	24	—	—	—	—	—
2020–21	Brynäs IF	SHL	39	11	7	18	10	—	—	—	—	—
2021–22	Brynäs IF	SHL	28	2	7	9	0	3	0	2	2	2
2022–23	KooKoo	Liiga	51	11	14	25	10	—	—	—	—	—
2023–24	KooKoo	Liiga	41	10	11	21	4	—	—	—	—	—
2024–25	Östersunds IK	Allsv	37	10	9	19	12	—	—	—	—	—
2025–26	EHC Winterthur	SL	45	16	28	44	14	—	—	—	—	—
SHL totals			214	33	39	72	38	14	0	3	3	2
Liiga totals			92	21	25	46	14	—	—	—	—	—

Medal record

Ice hockey

Representing Sweden

World Junior Championships
Silver medal – second place	2013 Ufa	

=== International ===
Year	Team	Event	Result	GP	G	A	Pts	PIM
2013	Sweden	WJC	2nd place, silver medalist(s)	6	2	4	6	0
Junior totals				6	2	4	6	0
