= Tomáš Mikúš =

- Born: 1 July 1993 (age 32) Skalica, Slovakia
- Height: 6 ft 0 in (183 cm)
- Weight: 176 lb (80 kg; 12 st 8 lb)
- Position: Left wing
- Shoots: Left
- Slovak team Former teams: HC Košice; HK 36 Skalica; HK Orange 20; HC Slovan Bratislava; Hokki; HC Olomouc; HK Nitra; HC Energie Karlovy Vary; PSG Berani Zlín; HC Nové Zámky
- Playing career: 2010–present

Tomáš Mikúš (born 1 July 1993) is a Slovak professional ice hockey left winger currently playing for HC Košice of the Slovak Extraliga.

== Career statistics ==
=== Regular season and playoffs ===
			Regular season					Playoffs
Season	Team	League	GP	G	A	Pts	PIM	GP	G	A	Pts	PIM
2010–11	HK 36 Skalica	Slovak-Jr.	36	21	25	46	8	—	—	—	—	—
2010–11	HK 36 Skalica	Slovak	8	2	4	6	4	5	0	0	0	0
2011–12	HK 36 Skalica	Slovak-Jr.	27	24	23	47	26	—	—	—	—	—
2011–12	HK 36 Skalica	Slovak	30	3	3	6	4	5	2	0	2	37
2011–12	HK Orange 20	Slovak	2	0	0	0	0	—	—	—	—	—
2011–12	HK Orange 20	Slovak.1	4	0	3	3	4	—	—	—	—	—
2012–13	HK 36 Skalica	Slovak	3	1	1	2	6	—	—	—	—	—
2012–13	HC Slovan Bratislava	KHL	34	3	4	7	4	3	0	0	0	0
2012–13	HC Slovan Bratislava	Slovak-Jr.	0	0	0	0	0	5	2	3	5	0
2013–14	HC Slovan Bratislava	KHL	30	1	1	2	18	—	—	—	—	—
2013–14	HK 36 Skalica	Slovak	7	1	1	2	4	5	1	0	1	6
2014–15	Hokki	Mestis	46	23	18	41	20	5	1	1	2	0
2015–16	HC Olomouc	Czech	52	11	5	16	24	5	0	0	0	18
2016–17	HC Olomouc	Czech	39	2	5	7	16	—	—	—	—	—
2017–18	HK Nitra	Slovak	38	23	9	32	59	8	4	3	7	6
2018–19	HC Energie Karlovy Vary	Czech	50	8	12	20	12	—	—	—	—	—
2019–20	HC Energie Karlovy Vary	Czech	51	8	16	24	12	2	0	0	0	0
2020–21	HC Energie Karlovy Vary	Czech	49	6	11	17	18	4	0	0	0	2
2021–22	PSG Berani Zlín	Czech	20	4	13	17	2	—	—	—	—	—
2021–22	HC Energie Karlovy Vary	Czech	35	6	18	24	10	2	0	0	0	0
Czech totals			296	45	80	125	94	13	0	0	0	20
Slovak totals			88	30	18	48	77	23	7	3	10	49
KHL totals			64	4	5	9	22	3	0	0	0	0

=== International ===
Year	Team	Event	Result	GP	G	A	Pts	PIM
2011	Slovakia	U18	10th	6	1	0	1	4
2013	Slovakia	WJC	8th	6	2	2	4	4
Junior totals				12	3	2	5	8
