= Edgars Siksna =

Latvian ice hockey player

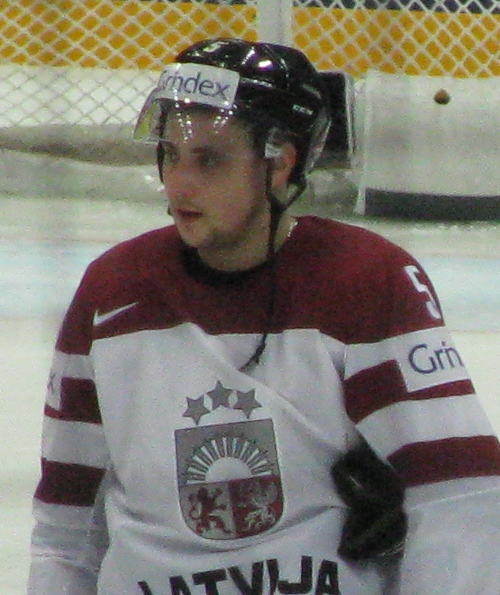
- Born: January 15, 1993 (age 33) Riga, Latvia
- Height: 6 ft 0 in (183 cm)
- Weight: 183 lb (83 kg; 13 st 1 lb)
- Position: Defence
- Shoots: Right
- KHL team (P) Cur. team Former teams: Dinamo Rīga; HK Rīga (MHL); HK Liepājas Metalurgs
- National team: Latvia
- Playing career: 2011–present

Edgars Siksna (born January 15, 1993) is a Latvian professional ice hockey defenceman. He is currently playing for Saryarka Karagandy in the Pro Hokei Ligasy.

== Playing career ==
Siksna started his professional career playing for Liepājas Metalurgs. In August 2013 Dinamo Rīga announced they had signed a contract with Siksna. He played his first KHL game on September 22, 2013 against Vityaz.

=== International ===
He participated at the 2012 World Junior Ice Hockey Championships as a member of the Latvia men's national junior ice hockey team.
