= Tomáš Pavelka =

Czech ice hockey player

- Born: May 29, 1993 (age 31); Ostrava, Czech Republic
- Height: 6 ft 1 in (185 cm)
- Weight: 194 lb (88 kg; 13 st 12 lb)
- Position: Defence
- Shoots: Left
- Liiga team Former teams: Lukko; HC Vítkovice; HC Litvínov; HC Sparta Praha
- NHL draft: Undrafted
- Playing career: 2011–present

Tomáš Pavelka (born May 29, 1993) is a Czech professional ice hockey defenceman currently playing under contract with Lukko in the Finnish Liiga. He originally played with HC Vítkovice in the Czech Extraliga during the 2010–11 Czech Extraliga season.
