= Andrei Sigaryov =

Russian ice hockey player

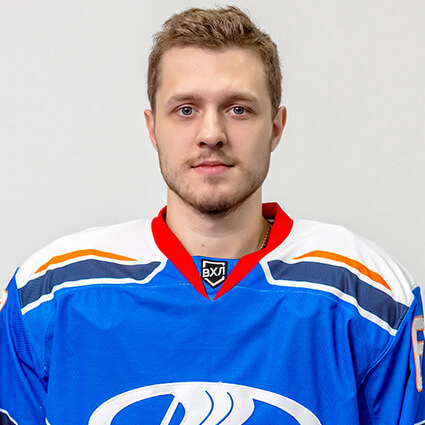
- Andrei Sigaryov
- Born: March 10, 1993 (age 32) Khabarovsk, Russia
- Height: 6 ft 1 in (185 cm)
- Weight: 198 lb (90 kg; 14 st 2 lb)
- Position: Left wing
- Shoots: Left
- VHL team Former teams: HC Yugra; SKA Saint Petersburg; Lokomotiv Yaroslavl; Admiral Vladivostok; Sibir Novosibirsk
- NHL draft: Undrafted
- Playing career: 2011–present

Andrei Mikhalovich Sigaryov (Russian: Андрей Михайлович Сигарёв; born March 10, 1993) is a Russian professional ice hockey player. He is currently an unrestricted free agent who most recently played with HC Lada Togliatti of the Supreme Hockey League (VHL).

Sigaryov made his Kontinental Hockey League debut playing with SKA Saint Petersburg during the 2012–13 KHL season.

On May 5, 2017, following the completion of the 2016–17 season, Sigaryov was traded by Admiral Vladivostok to Sibir Novosibirsk in exchange for Vladimir Butuzov.
