= Emil Bagin =

Slovak ice hockey defenceman

- Born: September 8, 1993 (age 32) Ilava, Czechoslovakia
- Height: 5 ft 9 in (175 cm)
- Weight: 176 lb (80 kg; 12 st 8 lb)
- Position: Defence
- Shoots: Right
- Ligue Magnus team Former teams: Aigles de Nice; HK Dukla Trenčín; MsHK Žilina; HKM Zvolen; HK Poprad; MHk 32 Liptovský Mikuláš
- Playing career: 2011–present

Emil Bagin (born September 8, 1993) is a Slovak professional ice hockey defenceman currently playing for Aigles de Nice of the Ligue Magnus.

Bagin started his career playing U18 and U20 level hockey for HK Dubnica and HK Dukla Trenčín before making his Tipsport Liga debut for the HK Orange 20 project during the 2010–11 season. The following season, he played one game for Dukla Trenčín's main roster. He continued to alternate between Dukla Trenčín, Dubnica and Team Slovakia U20 until he joined MsHK Žilina during the 2013–14 season.

In 2014, Bagin joined HKM Zvolen and spent two seasons with the team. He would then split the 2016–17 season with four different teams, HK 95 Panthers Považská Bystrica in the Slovak 1. Liga, HK Poprad in the Tipsport Liga, a return to Dukla Trenčín and with MHk 32 Liptovský Mikuláš.

On June 2, 2017, Bagin moved to France to sign for Aigles de Nice of the Ligue Magnus. He then returned to Žilina on August 14, 2018, to date his last season in the Tipsport Liga. Although he managed six goals during the season, his most since the 2012–13 season, he was unable to prevent the team's relegation to the 1. Liga.

Bagin would return to another former club in 2019, this time with Dubnica in the 1. Liga. In November 2019, he departed to make yet another return to a former club, Aigles de Nice in France.
