= Evgeny Mozer =

Russian ice hockey player

- Born: May 18, 1993 (age 32) Omsk, Russia
- Height: 6 ft 1 in (185 cm)
- Weight: 201 lb (91 kg; 14 st 5 lb)
- Position: Forward
- Shoots: Right
- KHL team Former teams: Free Agent; Avangard Omsk; HC Pardubice; Torpedo Nizhny Novgorod; Dynamo Moscow; Avtomobilist Yekaterinburg
- Playing career: 2012–present

Evgeny Mozer (Russian: Евгений Мозер; born May 18, 1993) is a Russian professional ice hockey forward. He is currently an unrestricted free agent who most recently played for Avtomobilist Yekaterinburg in the Kontinental Hockey League (KHL).

Mozer made his KHL debut playing with Avangard Omsk during the 2012–13 KHL season. He played a season on loan in the Czech Extraliga with HC Dynamo Pardubice before returning to the KHL.
