= Juuso Vainio =

Finnish ice hockey player

- Born: September 6, 1994 (age 30); Hämeenlinna, Finland
- Height: 6 ft 0 in (183 cm)
- Weight: 190 lb (86 kg; 13 st 8 lb)
- Position: Defense
- Shoots: Right
- NL team Former teams: HC Fribourg-Gottéron; HPK; Espoo Blues; JYP Jyväskylä; Växjö Lakers
- Playing career: 2012–present

Juuso Vainio, (born September 6, 1994) is a Finnish professional ice hockey player. He is currently playing for HC Fribourg-Gottéron of the Swiss National League (NL).

Vainio made his Liiga debut playing with HPK during the 2012–13 Liiga season.

== Awards and honours ==
Award	Year
SHL
Le Mat Trophy (Växjö Lakers)	2021
