= Thomas Nykopp =

Finnish ice hockey player

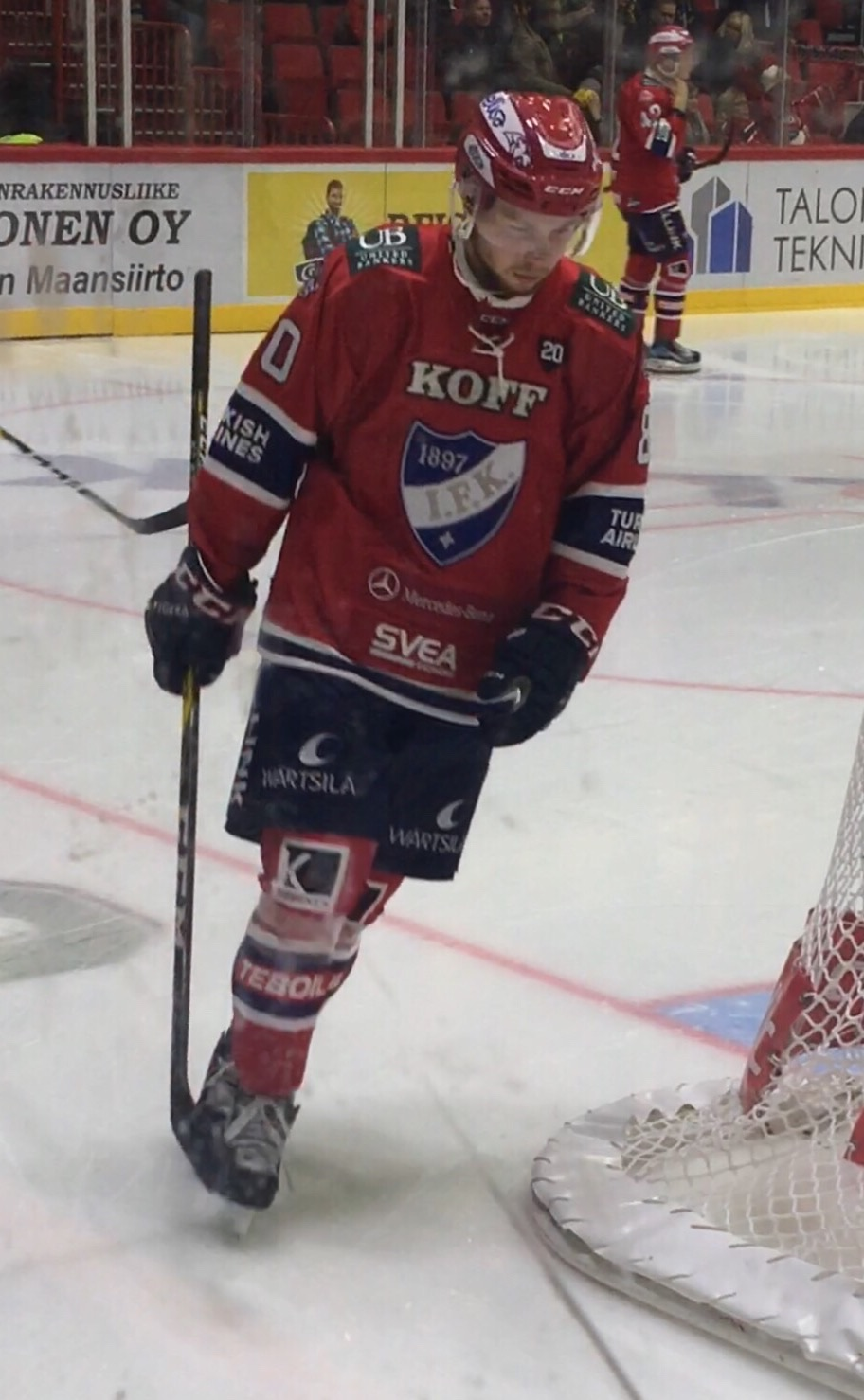
- Born: March 6, 1993 (age 32); Helsinki, Finland
- Height: 6 ft 3 in (191 cm)
- Weight: 190 lb (86 kg; 13 st 8 lb)
- Position: Forward
- Shoots: Left
- Liiga team: HIFK
- NHL draft: Undrafted
- Playing career: 2012–present

Thomas Nykopp (born March 6, 1993) is a Finnish ice hockey player. He is currently playing with HIFK in the Finnish Liiga.

Nykopp made his SM-liiga debut playing with HIFK during the 2012–13 season.
