= 2010 World U-17 Hockey Challenge =

Ice hockey tournament

Tournament details
- Host country: Canada
- Venue(s): McIntyre Community Building; Jus Jordan Arena; Tim Horton Arena; Kapuskasing Sports Palace; Joe Mavrinac Community Complex; New Liskeard Arena (in 6 host cities)
- Dates: December 28 - January 4
- Teams: 10

The 2010 World U-17 Hockey Challenge was an international ice hockey tournament held in Timmins, Iroquois Falls, Cochrane / Kapuskasing, Kirkland Lake, New Liskeard, Ontario, Canada between December 28, 2009, and January 4, 2010. The venues used for the tournament included the McIntyre Arena in Timmins, Jus Jordan Arena in Iroquois Falls, Tim Horton Arena in Cochrane, the Kapuskasing Sports Palace in Kapuskasing, Joe Mavrinac Community Complex in Kirkland Lake, and the New Liskeard Arena in New Liskeard. The United States won its third title, defeating Canada Ontario 2-1 in the gold-medal game.

== Participating teams ==
Canada entered five regional teams from across the country. These teams were:

- Canada Atlantic (New Brunswick, Newfoundland, Nova Scotia and Prince Edward Island)
- Canada Quebec
- Canada Ontario
- Canada Western (Manitoba and Saskatchewan)
- Canada Pacific (Alberta and British Columbia)

International teams were:

- United States
- Sweden
- Russia
- Finland
- Czech Republic

== Challenge results ==
=== Preliminary round ===
==== Group A ====
Team	Pld	W	OTW	OTL	L	GF	GA	GD	Pts
Canada Ontario	4	3	0	0	1	16	7	+9	9
Sweden	4	2	1	0	1	15	14	+1	8
Canada Quebec	4	2	0	1	1	13	12	+1	7
Canada West	4	1	0	0	3	14	18	−4	3
Finland	4	1	0	0	3	16	23	−7	3

===== Results =====
December 29, 2009	Canada West	2–4	Canada Quebec	Kapuskasing Sports Palace, Kapuskasing

December 29, 2009	Finland	5–3	Canada Ontario	McIntyre Arena, Timmins

December 30, 2009	Sweden	6–4	Finland	New Liskeard Rec Centre, New Liskeard

December 30, 2009	Canada Quebec	0–3	Canada Ontario	McIntyre Arena, Timmins

December 31, 2009	Finland	3–6	Canada Quebec	McIntyre Arena, Timmins

December 31, 2009	Canada West	2–5	Sweden	McIntyre Arena, Timmins

January 1, 2010	Finland	4–8	Canada West	Tim Horton Events Centre, Cochrane

January 1, 2010	Sweden	0–5	Canada Ontario	McIntyre Arena, Timmins

January 2, 2010	Canada Quebec	3–4 GWS	Sweden	Joe Mavrinac Com. Complex, Kirkland Lake

January 2, 2010	Canada Ontario	5–2	Canada West	McIntyre Arena, Timmins

==== Group B ====
Team	Pld	W	OTW	OTL	L	GF	GA	GD	Pts
United States	4	4	0	0	0	19	7	+12	12
Russia	4	3	0	0	1	22	12	+10	9
Canada Pacific	4	2	0	0	2	16	12	+4	6
Canada Atlantic	4	0	1	0	3	12	27	−15	2
Czech Republic	4	0	0	1	3	6	17	−11	1

===== Results =====
December 29, 2009	Canada Atlantic	0–7	United States	McIntyre Arena, Timmins

December 29, 2009	Canada Pacific	2–6	Russia	Kapuskasing Sports Palace, Kapuskasing

December 30, 2009	Canada Pacific	10–4	Canada Atlantic	McIntyre Arena, Timmins

December 30, 2009	United States	3–2	Czech Republic	New Liskeard Rec Centre, New Liskeard

December 31, 2009	Canada Atlantic	5–4 OT	Czech Republic	Jus Jordan Sports Complex, Iroquois Falls

December 31, 2009	Russia	4–7	United States	Jus Jordan Sports Complex, Iroquois Falls

January 1, 2010	Canada Atlantic	3–6	Russia	McIntyre Arena, Timmins

January 1, 2010	Czech Republic	0–3	Canada Pacific	Tim Horton Events Centre, Cochrane

January 2, 2010	Russia	6–0	Czech Republic	McIntyre Arena, Timmins

January 2, 2010	United States	2–1	Canada Pacific	Joe Mavrinac Com. Complex, Kirkland Lake

=== Final round ===
Semifinals
A1	Canada Ontario	6
B2	Russia	4
A2	Sweden	5
B1	United States	6*

Final
SF1	Canada Ontario	1
SF2	United States	2

* Decided in overtime.

==== Semifinals ====
January 3, 2010	Russia	4–6	Canada Ontario	McIntyre Arena, Timmins

January 3, 2010	Sweden	5–6 OT	United States	Jus Jordan Sports Complex, Iroquois Falls

==== 9th place game ====
January 3, 2010	Czech Republic	7–5	Finland	McIntyre Arena, Timmins

==== 7th place game ====
January 3, 2010	Canada Atlantic	4–2	Canada West	Jus Jordan Sports Complex, Iroquois Falls

==== 5th place game ====
January 3, 2010	Canada Pacific	4–0	Canada Quebec	McIntyre Arena, Timmins

==== Bronze medal game ====
January 4, 2010	Sweden	5–2	Russia	McIntyre Arena, Timmins

==== Gold medal game ====
January 4, 2010	Canada Ontario	1–2	United States	McIntyre Arena, Timmins

== Scoring leaders ==
Player	Country	GP	G	A	Pts	PIM
Rocco Grimaldi	United States	6	4	10	14	8
Alexander Khokhlachev	Russia	6	5	8	13	4
Mikhail Grigorenko	Russia	6	4	6	10	10
Anton Zlobin	Russia	6	2	8	10	10
J. T. Miller	United States	6	5	4	9	28
Mika Zibanejad	Sweden	6	5	4	9	4
Ty Rattie	Canada Pacific	5	2	7	9	6
Joel Armia	Finland	5	5	3	8	2
Victor Rask	Sweden	6	1	7	8	2
Marek Hrbas	Czech Republic	5	4	3	7	0

== Goaltender leaders ==
(Minimum 60 Minutes Played)

Player	Country	Mins	GA	SV%	GAA	SO
John Gibson	United States	180	4	.957	1.33	0
Tyson Teichmann	Canada Ontario	340	9	.927	1.59	2
Andrey Makarov	Russia	240	14	.920	3.50	1
Zach Rakochy	Canada West	140	9	.911	3.86	0
Laurent Brossoit	Canada Pacific	120	4	.902	2.00	1

== Final standings ==
	Team
1st place, gold medalist(s)	United States
2nd place, silver medalist(s)	Canada Ontario
3rd place, bronze medalist(s)	Sweden
4	Canada Pacific
5	Russia
6	Canada Quebec
7	Canada Atlantic
8	Czech Republic
9	Finland
10	Canada West

== Sources ==
- http://www.hockeycanada.ca/index.php/ci_id/60832/ss_id/24850/la_id/1.htm
