= 2012 World Junior Ice Hockey Championships =

U20 men's ice hockey tournament in Alberta, Canada

2012 IIHF U20 World Championship

Tournament details
- Host country: Canada
- Cities: Calgary, Edmonton
- Venue(s): Scotiabank Saddledome and Rexall Place (in 2 host cities)
- Dates: December 26, 2011 – January 5, 2012
- Teams: 10

Final positions
- Champions: Sweden (2nd title)
- Runners-up: Russia
- Third place: Canada
- Fourth place: Finland

Tournament statistics
- Games played: 31
- Goals scored: 230 (7.42 per game)
- Attendance: 444,718 (14,346 per game)
- Scoring leader: (Russia) Evgeny Kuznetsov (13 points)

Awards
- MVP: (Russia) Evgeny Kuznetsov

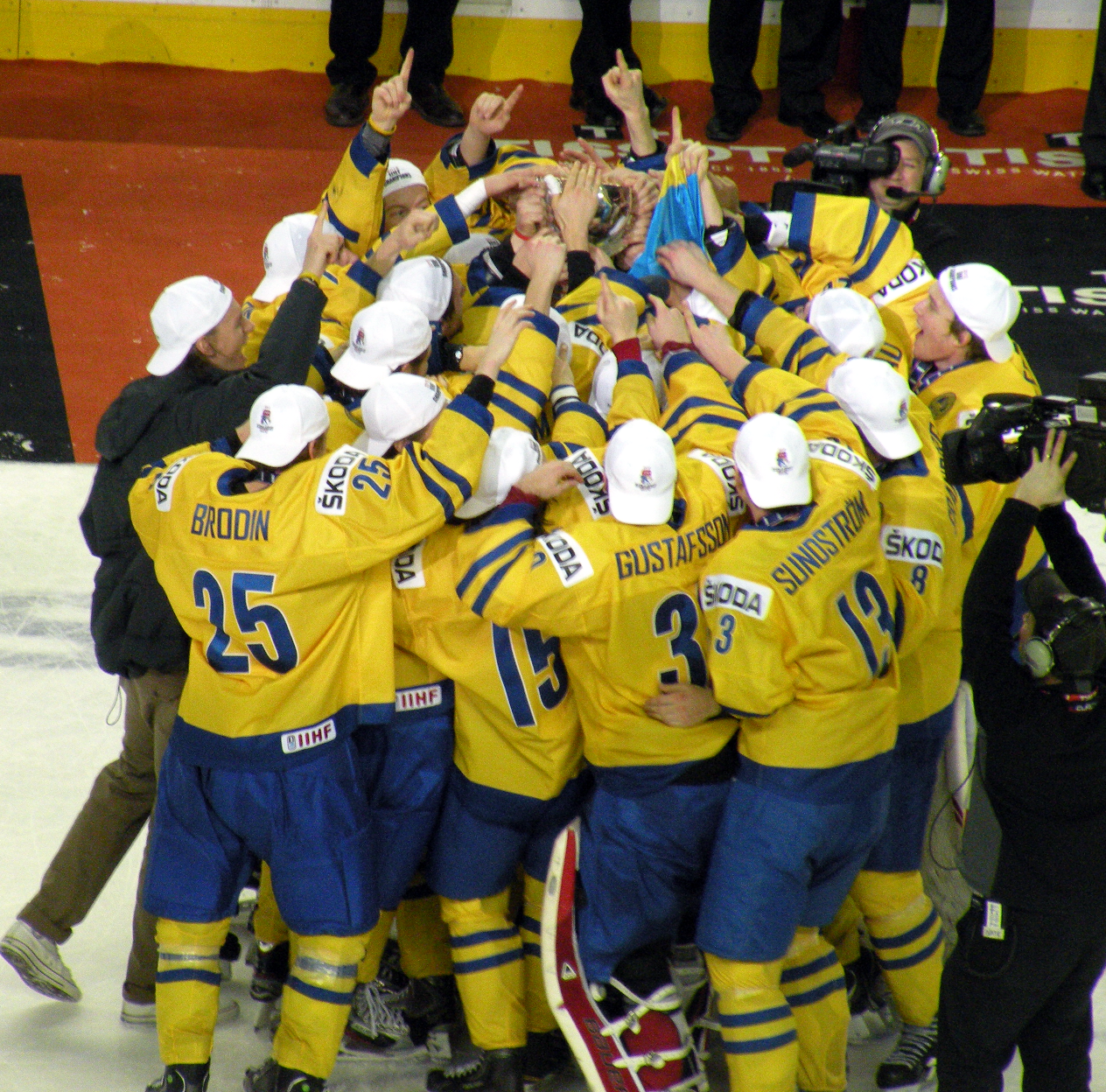
Sweden celebrates with the 2012 World Junior Championship trophy

The 2012 IIHF U20 World Championship (commonly known as the 2012 World Junior Ice Hockey Championships) was the 36th edition of the Ice Hockey World Junior Championship. It was hosted in Calgary and Edmonton, Alberta, Canada. It began on December 26, 2011, and ended with the gold medal game played in Calgary on January 5, 2012. Sweden defeated defending-champion Russia 1–0 in overtime to win their first title in 31 years. Russian forward Evgeny Kuznetsov was named MVP of the tournament. Denmark was relegated to Division I and Germany was promoted to the 2013 World Junior Ice Hockey Championships.

Canada missed the final for the first time in 11 years when they lost 6–5 against Russia in a semifinal in which Canada were down 6–1 halfway through the third period. However, the Canadians extended their consecutive medal streak at the tournament to 14 (5 gold, 6 silver, 3 bronze) with a 4–0 victory over Finland in the bronze medal game. The fourth-place finish for Finland was their best result in the tournament since 2006. The United States ended up in the relegation round for the first time since 1999.

== Host city selection ==
On February 1, 2008, Hockey Canada and the Canadian Hockey League announced that six groups had submitted letters of intent to bid to host the 2012 tournament: Calgary/Edmonton; Halifax, Nova Scotia; London/Windsor, Ontario; Saskatoon, Saskatchewan; Toronto; and Winnipeg. The London/Windsor, Halifax and Winnipeg bids withdrew before the application deadline, leaving three groups. Saskatoon was selected to host the 2010 tournament with Regina, Saskatchewan, leaving only the Calgary/Edmonton and Toronto bids for this tournament.

The Alberta bid, supported by the National Hockey League's Calgary Flames and Edmonton Oilers as well as the Western Hockey League's Calgary Hitmen and Edmonton Oil Kings, was selected to host the tournament on August 28, 2008. It will be the second time the tournament has been hosted in the province; Red Deer served as the primary host of the 1995 World Junior Championship, while some tournament games were played in both Calgary and Edmonton.

== Venues ==
Scotiabank Saddledome Capacity: 19,289	Rexall Place Capacity: 16,839
Canada – Calgary	Canada – Edmonton

== Attendance ==
As part of their bid, the two cities projected that they would generate a tournament record attendance in excess of 475,000 fans and provide an economic benefit of $42 million to the province of Alberta. Following a reserved offering of 10- and 21-game ticket packs for Edmonton and Calgary games respectively to season ticket holders of the Oilers, Oil Kings, Flames and Hitmen, the tournament committee held a lottery to award the right to purchase the remaining seats. While the entry deadline was supposed to coincide with the conclusion of the 2011 tournament, organizers were flooded with so many entries that their website servers crashed. Organizers were overwhelmed by the response; over 187,000 entries were received for the draw.

Calling the demand unprecedented, Hockey Canada announced that the 17,000 ticket packages made available to lottery winners had sold out in a matter of days, a year in advance of the tournament. While organizers were pleased with the result, the way the lottery was handled has angered fans who won the right to purchase tickets but were unable to do so as no tickets were left when their turn to buy arrived.

In spite of multiple sources proclaiming that the event beat the record by nearly 120,000 it fell just short of setting a new attendance record. The IIHF reported a total of 444,718 marginally short of the record set in 2009. The tournament in Ottawa, Ontario, Canada had 453,282 spectators. Though many more tickets were sold as part of tournament packages, the IIHF only counts actual paid spectators in attendance in its figures.

== Top division ==
Each round was a round-robin tournament, where the teams played each other once within their group. The Preliminary Round was divided into two groups: Group A and Group B, which included five teams each. From each group, the top three teams qualified for the playoffs; the 1st-ranked teams earned a direct trip to the Semifinals, while the 2nd and 3rd-ranked teams qualified for the Quarterfinals. The 4th and 5th-ranked teams had to play in the Relegation Round, where the three best teams qualified for the Top Division tournament in 2013, with the last-placed team being relegated to the 2013 Division I tournament. In the Semifinals, the directly-qualified Semifinalists faced the winners from the Quarterfinals.

=== Preliminary round ===
==== Group A ====
All round robin games held in Calgary, Alberta, at the Scotiabank Saddledome.

Pos	Team	Pld	W	OTW	OTL	L	GF	GA	GD	Pts	Qualification
1	Sweden	4	2	2	0	0	26	11	+15	10	Semifinals
2	Russia	4	3	0	1	0	23	5	+18	10	Quarterfinals
3	Slovakia	4	2	0	0	2	11	17	−6	6	Quarterfinals
4	Switzerland	4	1	0	1	2	12	16	−4	4	Relegation round
5	Latvia	4	0	0	0	4	8	31	−23	0	Relegation round

Source: IIHF

All times are local (Mountain Time Zone – UTC−7).

December 26, 2011; 15:30	Latvia	4–9 (2–3, 1–3, 1–3)	Sweden	Scotiabank Saddledome; Attendance: 12,544

Game reference

Kristers Gudļevskis
Goalies
Johan Gustafsson
Referees:
(Germany) Daniel Piechaczek
(Canada) Derek Zalaski
Linesmen:
(Czech Republic) Jiří Gebauer
(Germany) Andre Schrader

	0–1	03:28 – M. Friberg (J. Larsson, L. Rensfeldt) (PP)
T. Andersons (Ņ. Koļesņikovs, T. Bļugers) (PP) – 05:34	1–1
	1–2	05:50 – M. Friberg (J. Sundström)
	1–3	08:13 – M. Zibanejad (S. Collberg, R. Rakell)
R. Lipsbergs (Ņ. Jevpalovs, J. Ziemiņš) – 08:54	2–3
	2–4	25:38 – S. Collberg (J. Brodin, V. Rask)
R. Lipsbergs (Ņ. Jevpalovs) – 32:29	3–4
	3–5	34:48 – E. Thorell (P. Nemeth)
	3–6	35:38 – M. Zibanejad (J. Brodin, R. Rakell) (PP)
	3–7	47:46 – J. Nordström (L. Rensfeldt, E. Thorell)
	3–8	54:27 – M. Friberg (L. Rensfeldt, M. Bäckman) (PP)
	3–9	55:07 – M. Friberg (S. Collberg)
Z. Girgensons (P. Zvirbulis, K. Nīmanis) (PP) – 58:50	4–9

20 min
Penalties
26 min
13
Shots
40

December 26, 2011; 20:00	Switzerland	0–3 (0–1, 0–2, 0–0)	Russia	Scotiabank Saddledome; Attendance: 15,390

Game reference

Tim Wolf
Goalies
Andrei Vasilevski
Referees:
(Finland) Tom Laaksonen
(United States) Thomas Sterns
Linesmen:
(Canada) Chris Carlson
(United States) Christopher Woodworth

0–1	08:22 – A. Khokhlachev
0–2	25:27 – N. Gusev (Y. Kosov, M. Grigorenko)
0–3	35:04 – M. Grigorenko (N. Kucherov, N. Gusev)

6 min
Penalties
6 min
40
Shots
30

December 27, 2011; 20:00	Slovakia	3–1 (0–0, 1–1, 2–0)	Latvia	Scotiabank Saddledome; Attendance: 12,589

Game reference

Juraj Šimboch
Goalies
Kristers Gudļevskis
Referees:
(United States) Ian Croft
(Czech Republic) Vladimír Šindler
Linesmen:
(Germany) Andre Scharder
(Finland) Hannu Sormunen

	0–1	26:41 – J. Ziemiņš (A. Kuzmenkovs)
T. Jurčo (M. Marinčin, M. Gernát) (PP) – 35:28	1–1
M. Tvrdoň (M. Bubela, M. Toman) – 42:02	2–1
M. Toman (R. Mráz) (EN) – 59:22	3–1

12 min
Penalties
8 min
45
Shots
26

December 28, 2011; 15:30	Sweden	4–3 GWS (1–0, 1–1, 1–2) (OT 0–0) (SO: 1–0)	Switzerland	Scotiabank Saddledome; Attendance: 14,782

Game reference

Johan Gustafsson
Goalies
Lukas Meili
Referees:
(United States) Ian Croft
(Czech Republic) Vladimír Šindler
Linesmen:
(Canada) Chris Carlson
(Czech Republic) Jiří Gebauer

M. Friberg (L. Rensfeldt, J. Klingberg) (PP) – 14:23	1–0
	1–1	25:14 – J. Vermin (D. Kukan) (PP)
J. Nordström (M. Bäckman, W. Karlsson) (PP) – 36:11	2–1
L. Rensfeldt (E. Thorell, P. Granberg) – 41:56	3–1
	3–2	52:51 – J. Vermin (G. Hofmann) (PP2)
	3–3	57:56 – D. Kukan (C. Bertschy)

S. Collberg
M. Friberg
Shootout
(miss) J. Vermin
(miss) C. Bertschy
22 min
Penalties
12 min
54
Shots
27

December 28, 2011; 20:00	Russia	3–1 (0–1, 1–0, 2–0)	Slovakia	Scotiabank Saddledome; Attendance: 15,987

Game reference

Andrey Makarov
Goalies
Juraj Šimboch
Referees:
(Germany) Daniel Piechaczek
(Canada) Derek Zalaski
Linesmen:
(Finland) Hannu Sormunen
(United States) Christopher Woodworth

	0–1	19:27 – M. Bubela
I. Ozhiganov (N. Yakupov, Y. Kosov) – 24:11	1–1
M. Naumenkov (I. Zemchenko) – 41:45	2–1
N. Kucherov (M. Grigorenko, N. Nesterov) – 54:51	3–1

20 min
Penalties
2 min
40
Shots
32

December 29, 2011; 20:00	Latvia	0–14 (0–1, 0–6, 0–7)	Russia	Scotiabank Saddledome; Attendance: 14,780

Game reference

Elvis Merzļikins
Goalies
Andrei Vasilevski
Referees:
(Sweden) Mikael Nord
(Sweden) Sören Persson
Linesmen:
(Canada) Chris Carlson
(Germany) Andre Scharder

0–1	10:29 – M. Grigorenko (N. Kucherov, N. Gusev)
0–2	20:52 – A. Sergeyev (N. Yakupov, Z. Arzamastsev) (PP)
0–3	27:04 – E. Kuznetsov (N. Yakupov, V. Antipin) (PP)
0–4	30:04 – E. Kuznetsov (N. Gusev, N. Nesterov) (PP)
0–5	32:53 – G. Zheldakov (E. Kuznetsov, N. Gusev)
0–6	35:07 – N. Gusev (E. Kuznetsov, N. Nesterov) (PP)
0–7	38:34 – N. Gusev (N. Kucherov, E. Kuznetsov)
0–8	40:40 – P. Kulikov (E. Kuznetsov, I. Zemchenko)
0–9	41:43 – A. Khokhlachev (N. Yakupov, M. Naumenkov)
0–10	42:34 – E. Kuznetsov (N. Gusev, N. Kucherov)
0–11	44:14 – I. Zemchenko (P. Kulikov, E. Kuznetsov)
0–12	51:36 – Y. Kosov (D. Apalkov, S. Barbashev)
0–13	53:29 – A. Khokhlachev (I. Telegin, V. Antipin) (PP)
0–14	54:24 – N. Nesterov (N. Gusev, E. Kuznetsov)

10 min
Penalties
10 min
30
Shots
50

December 30, 2011; 15:30	Sweden	9–1 (2–1, 2–0, 5–0)	Slovakia	Scotiabank Saddledome; Attendance: 15,187

Game reference

Anton Forsberg
Goalies
Dominik Riečický
Referees:
(United States) Ian Croft
(Finland) Tom Laaksonen
Linesmen:
(Czech Republic) Jiří Gebauer
(United States) Christopher Woodworth

E. Thorell – 04:40	1–0
	1–1	11:36 – M. Tvrdoň (M. Toman, T. Jurčo) (PP)
M. Friberg (J. Larsson, J. Brodin) – 16:22	2–1
S. Collberg (J. Larsson, J. Sundström) – 24:15	3–1
J. Sundström (R. Rakell) – 38:29	4–1
M. Zibanejad (S. Collberg) (PP) – 44:50	5–1
R. Rakell (F. Forsberg, M. Zibanejad) – 48:06	6–1
J. Nordström (E. Thorell, P. Nemeth) – 51:28	7–1
S. Collberg (J. Klingberg, J. Sundström) (PP) – 53:42	8–1
E. Thorell (L. Rensfeldt, J. Klingberg) – 58:42	9–1

20 min
Penalties
16 min
55
Shots
15

December 30, 2011; 20:00	Switzerland	5–3 (1–0, 2–1, 2–2)	Latvia	Scotiabank Saddledome; Attendance: 13,666

Game reference

Tim Wolf
Goalies
Kristers Gudļevskis
Referees:
(Germany) Daniel Piechaczek
(Canada) Derek Zalaski
Linesmen:
(Germany) Andre Scharder
(Finland) Hannu Sormunen

C. Bertschy (D. Trutmann) (PP) – 08:45	1–0
G. Haas (M. Vermeille, A. Bertaggia) – 22:18	2–0
	2–1	28:26 – T. Andersons (E. Siksna, D. Straupe)
C. Bertschy (S. Walser) (PP) – 38:28	3–1
	3–2	42:23 – Ņ. Jevpalovs (V. Hvorostiņins, K. Kalniņš)
	3–3	52:42 – V. Hvorostiņins (Ņ. Jevpalovs, A. Kuzmenkovs)
G. Haas – 53:04	4–3
C. Marti – 54:03	5–3

12 min
Penalties
6 min
41
Shots
23

December 31, 2011; 16:00	Slovakia	6–4 (1–2, 1–1, 4–1)	Switzerland	Scotiabank Saddledome; Attendance: 13,029

Game reference

Juraj Šimboch
Goalies
Lukas Meili
Tim Wolf
Referees:
(United States) Thomas Sterns
(Canada) Derek Zalaski
Linesmen:
(Czech Republic) Jiří Gebauer
(Finland) Hannu Sormunen

	0–1	06:09 – J. Vermin (T. Richard, C. Bertschy)
	0–2	07:16 – S. Andrighetto (A. Bertaggia)
M. Chovan (T. Jurčo, M. Ďaloga) – 08:20	1–2
	1–3	28:40 – J. Vermin (T. Richard) (PP)
M. Chovan – 32:46	2–3
	2–4	40:47 – T. Richard
T. Matoušek (M. Hinďoš, M. Bene) – 45:14	3–4
M. Marinčin (M. Daňo, T. Jurčo) – 46:05	4–4
M. Chovan (T. Jurčo, R. Mráz) – 48:15	5–4
M. Gernát (T. Jurčo, M. Tvrdoň) – 49:43	6–4

10 min
Penalties
6 min
31
Shots
28

December 31, 2011; 20:00	Russia	3–4 OT (3–0, 0–0, 0–3) (OT: 0–1)	Sweden	Scotiabank Saddledome; Attendance: 16,643

Game reference

Andrei Vasilevski
Goalies
Johan Gustafsson
Anton Forsberg
Referees:
(Finland) Tom Laaksonen
(Czech Republic) Vladimír Šindler
Linesmen:
(Canada) Chris Carlson
(United States) Christopher Woodworth

I. Zemchenko (N. Yakupov) – 02:09	1–0
Y. Kosov (S. Barbashev, D. Apalkov) – 02:16	2–0
I. Telegin (SH) – 13:33	3–0
	3–1	43:17 – O. Klefbom (J. Larsson)
	3–2	52:19 – R. Rakell (P. Nemeth, J. Larsson)
	3–3	59:20 – M. Friberg (J. Brodin, J. Nordström)
	3–4	62:44 – J. Nordström (P. Nemeth, M. Friberg) (OT)

16 min
Penalties
4 min
26
Shots
55

==== Group B ====
All round robin games held in Edmonton, Alberta, at Rexall Place.

Pos	Team	Pld	W	OTW	OTL	L	GF	GA	GD	Pts	Qualification
1	Canada	4	4	0	0	0	26	5	+21	12	Semifinals
2	Finland	4	3	0	0	1	19	10	+9	9	Quarterfinals
3	Czech Republic	4	2	0	0	2	12	11	+1	6	Quarterfinals
4	United States	4	1	0	0	3	16	15	+1	3	Relegation round
5	Denmark	4	0	0	0	4	6	38	−32	0	Relegation round

Source: IIHF

All times are local (Mountain Time Zone – UTC−7).

December 26, 2011; 13:30	Finland	1–8 (0–2, 1–3, 0–3)	Canada	Rexall Place; Attendance: 15,296

Game reference

Christopher Gibson
Goalies
Mark Visentin
Referees:
(Sweden) Mikael Nord
(Sweden) Sören Persson
Linesmen:
(Sweden) Johannes Kack
(Slovakia) Milan Novák

	0–1	02:14 – M. Stone (J. Huberdeau, R. Strome)
	0–2	04:25 – B. Gallagher (J. Schwartz, D. Hamilton)
A. Ruuttu (M. Aaltonen, A. Barkov) – 21:21	1–2
	1–3	23:02 – M. Stone (J. Huberdeau, F. Hamilton)
	1–4	29:24 – J. Huberdeau (T. Pearson, N. Beaulieu) (PP)
	1–5	32:54 – D. Hamilton (R. Strome, J. Schwartz) (PP)
	1–6	40:52 – B. Connolly (T. Pearson, B. Gormley)
	1–7	44:05 – M. Stone (J. Huberdeau, R. Strome)
	1–8	47:18 – R. Strome (B. Gallagher, J. Huberdeau)

4 min
Penalties
8 min
25
Shots
42

December 26, 2011; 18:00	Denmark	3–11 (2–3, 0–6, 1–2)	United States	Rexall Place; Attendance: 13,604

Game reference

Sebastian Feuk
Dennis Jensen
Goalies
Jack Campbell
Referees:
(Russia) Vyacheslav Bulanov
(Finland) JP Ronn
Linesmen:
(Canada) Kiel Murchison
(Russia) Dmitry Sivov

	0–1	00:24 – C. Coyle (J. Merrill, J. Zucker)
M. Bau Hansen (N. Jensen, P. Bjorkstrand) (PP) – 03:12	1–1
	1–2	04:41 – J. Zucker (D. Forbort)
	1–3	08:26 – J. Tinordi (J. Miller, J. Zucker)
M. Bau Hansen (T. Spelling, P. Bjorkstrand) (PP) – 09:04	2–3
	2–4	21:25 – N. Bjugstad (A. Czarnik, A. Clendening)
	2–5	27:12 – C. Coyle (B. Saad, E. Etem) (PP)
	2–6	29:07 – K. Rau (A. Clendening, A. Czarnik)
	2–7	30:21 – B. Arnold (J. Archibald, E. Etem)
	2–8	30:51 – J. Miller (B. Arnold, T. Tynan) (PP)
	2–9	36:01 – K. Rau (A. Watson, J. Trouba) (PP)
T. Spelling (P. Bjorkstrand, N. Jensen) (PP) – 44:20	3–9
	3–10	51:04 – C. Coyle (J. Zucker, D. Forbort)
	3–11	55:56 – S. Johns

20 min
Penalties
8 min
24
Shots
44

December 27, 2011; 18:00	Czech Republic	7–0 (1–0, 2–0, 4–0)	Denmark	Rexall Place; Attendance: 12,967

Game reference

Petr Mrázek
Goalies
Sebastian Feuk
Referees:
(Canada) Devin Klein
(Switzerland) Brent Reiber
Linesmen:
(Switzerland) Nicolas Fluri
(Russia) Dmitry Sivov

T. Hertl (J. Culek, M. Hrbas) (PP) – 05:44	1–0
T. Hertl (J. Culek, P. Zámorský) – 22:44	2–0
R. Faksa (J. Říha, T. Hyka) – 31:13	3–0
P. Holík (J. Sekáč, P. Zámorský) (PP) – 41:50	4–0
T. Filippi – 42:10	5–0
D. Jaškin (D. Krejčí, T. Hyka) (PP) – 55:06	6–0
J. Říha (J. Culek, V. Mozík) (SH) – 56:42	7–0

8 min
Penalties
8 min
44
Shots
12

December 28, 2011; 13:30	United States	1–4 (0–0, 0–1, 1–3)	Finland	Rexall Place; Attendance: 14,000

Game reference

John Gibson
Goalies
Sami Aittokallio
Referees:
(Canada) Devin Klein
(Switzerland) Brent Reiber
Linesmen:
(Canada) Kiel Murchison
(Slovakia) Milan Novák

	0–1	21:21 – M. Salomäki (J. Armia)
B. Saad (E. Etem, C. Coyle) – 40:19	1–1
	1–2	50:53 – J. Armia (Ma. Granlund, R. Ristolainen)
	1–3	51:22 – Mi. Granlund (J. Hakanpää, T. Pulkkinen)
	1–4	56:27 – J. Armia (J. Donskoi)

10 min
Penalties
8 min
39
Shots
27

December 28, 2011; 18:00	Canada	5–0 (1–0, 2–0, 2–0)	Czech Republic	Rexall Place; Attendance: 16,417

Game reference

Scott Wedgewood
Goalies
Petr Mrázek
Referees:
(Russia) Vyacheslav Bulanov
(Finland) JP Ronn
Linesmen:
(Switzerland) Nicolas Fluri
(Sweden) Johannes Kack

M. Stone (J. Huberdeau, R. Strome) – 05:37	1–0
R. Strome (F. Hamilton, S. Wedgewood) (PP) – 36:16	2–0
B. Connolly (Q. Howden, M. Bournival) – 38:11	3–0
M. Scheifele (T. Pearson) – 49:00	4–0
M. Scheifele (T. Pearson, B. Gormley) (PP) – 54:40	5–0

26 min
Penalties
20 min
38
Shots
26

December 29, 2011; 18:00	Denmark	2–10 (0–4, 0–3, 2–3)	Canada	Rexall Place; Attendance: 16,275

Game reference

Sebastian Feuk
Goalies
Mark Visentin
Referees:
(Finland) Tom Laaksonen
(United States) Thomas Sterns
Linesmen:
(Sweden) Johannes Kack
(Russia) Dmitry Sivov

	0–1	02:34 – Q. Howden (S. Harrington, R. Murray)
	0–2	06:17 – B. Connolly (B. Gormley, B. Jenner) (SH)
	0–3	16:05 – M. Stone
	0–4	18:35 – R. Strome (M. Stone, J. Huberdeau)
	0–5	20:25 – S. Harrington (B. Connolly, Q. Howden)
	0–6	24:56 – M. Stone (S. Harrington, R. Murray)
	0–7	35:31 – F. Hamilton (S. Harrington, N. Beaulieu)
N. Meyer (J. Christensen, M. Bau-Hansen) – 43:05	1–7
E. Kristensen (N. Jensen, P. Bjorkstrand) (PP) – 48:48	2–7
	2–8	51:32 – B. Gormley (M. Scheifele) (PP)
	2–9	55:27 – B. Gormley (Q. Howden, F. Hamilton)
	2–10	56:59 – B. Gallagher (B. Jenner) (SH)

4 min
Penalties
16 min
26
Shots
51

December 30, 2011; 13:30	United States	2–5 (1–1, 1–1, 0–3)	Czech Republic	Rexall Place; Attendance: 14,733

Game reference

Jack Campbell
Goalies
Petr Mrázek
Referees:
(Switzerland) Brent Reiber
(Finland) JP Ronn
Linesmen:
(Canada) Kiel Murchison
(Russia) Dmitry Sivov

T. Tynan (J. Miller, B. Arnold) (PP) – 05:14	1–0
	1–1	12:05 – T. Filippi (D. Přibyl, J. Říha)
B. Arnold (J. Zucker, J. Merrill) (PP) – 31:50	2–1
	2–2	34:51 – T. Hertl
	2–3	52:26 – P. Holík (J. Sekáč, D. Krejčí)
	2–4	57:19 – T. Filippi (T. Nosek)
	2–5	58:34 – P. Holík (ENG)

6 min
Penalties
37 min
54
Shots
29

December 30, 2011; 18:00	Finland	10–1 (3–0, 2–1, 5–0)	Denmark	Rexall Place; Attendance: 13,144

Game reference

Christopher Gibson
Goalies
Sebastian Feuk
Referees:
(Russia) Vyacheslav Bulanov
(Sweden) Mikael Nord
Linesmen:
(Switzerland) Nicolas Fluri
(Slovakia) Milan Novák

M. Salomäki – 08:36	1–0
J. Hakanpää (J. Donskoi, M. Salomäki) (PP) – 10:25	2–0
V. Pokka (M. Hännikäinen, O. Paajanen) – 11:41	3–0
M. Kuronen (Mi. Granlund, T. Pulkkinen) – 24:09	4–0
	4–1	33:39 – P. Bjorkstrand (PS)
M. Salomäki (J. Hakanpää, V. Pokka) (PP) – 34:49	5–1
J. Armia (M. Salomäki, J. Donskoi) (PP) – 41:37	6–1
T. Pulkkinen (Mi. Granlund) – 44:14	7–1
T. Pulkkinen (Mi. Granlund) – 48:26	8–1
T. Pulkkinen (Ma. Granlund, V. Pokka) – 57:48	9–1
T. Pulkkinen (Ma. Granlund, Mi. Granlund) (PP) – 59:56	10–1

10 min
Penalties
12 min
59
Shots
25

December 31, 2011; 14:00	Czech Republic	0–4 (0–2, 0–1, 0–1)	Finland	Rexall Place; Attendance: 14,429

Game reference

Petr Mrázek
Goalies
Sami Aittokallio
Referees:
(Canada) Devin Klein
(Switzerland) Brent Reiber
Linesmen:
(Switzerland) Nicolas Fluri
(Canada) Kiel Murchison

0–1	11:42 – A. Ruuttu (Mi. Granlund, T. Pulkkinen) (PP)
0–2	16:19 – M. Aaltonen (A. Barkov)
0–3	34:17 – J. Donskoi (J. Armia, M. Salomäki)
0–4	43:37 – T. Pulkkinen (Ma. Granlund, Mi. Granlund)

16 min
Penalties
2 min
36
Shots
28

December 31, 2011; 18:00	Canada	3–2 (3–0, 0–0, 0–2)	United States	Rexall Place; Attendance: 16,647

Game reference

Scott Wedgewood
Goalies
Jack Campbell
Referees:
(Russia) Vyacheslav Bulanov
(Sweden) Soeren Persson
Linesmen:
(Sweden) Johannes Kack
(Slovakia) Milan Novák

M. Stone (J. Huberdeau, D. Hamilton) (PP) – 05:39	1–0
J. Schwartz (M. Stone, R. Strome) – 10:12	2–0
B. Connolly – 15:59	3–0
	3–1	49:49 – C. Coyle (J. Miller)
	3–2	53:12 – J. Zucker (B. Arnold, E. Etem)

12 min
Penalties
10 min
35
Shots
32

=== Relegation round ===
The results from matches between teams from the same group in the preliminary round were carried forward to this round.

Pos	Team	Pld	W	OTW	OTL	L	GF	GA	GD	Pts	Relegation
1	United States	3	3	0	0	0	25	6	+19	9	
2	Switzerland	3	1	1	0	1	10	8	+2	5	
3	Latvia	3	0	1	0	2	7	18	−11	2	
4	Denmark	3	0	0	2	1	7	17	−10	2	Relegated to the 2013 Division I A

Source: IIHF

All times are local (Mountain Time Zone – UTC−7).

January 2, 2012; 11:00	Switzerland	4–3 OT (2–2, 1–1, 0–0) (OT: 1–0)	Denmark	Scotiabank Saddledome; Attendance: 9,398

Game reference

Tim Wolf
Goalies
Sebastian Feuk
Referees:
(United States) Ian Croft
(Finland) JP Ronn
Linesmen:
(Slovakia) Milan Novák
(Finland) Hannu Sormunen

	0–1	01:10 – O. Bjorkstrand (P. Bjorkstrand, T. Spelling)
C. Schneuwly (L. Martschini, R. Amstutz) – 01:45	1–1
A. Bertaggia (S. Andrighetto) – 03:29	2–1
	2–2	16:56 – N. Jensen (P. Bjorkstrand, M. Bau Hansen) (PP)
G. Hofmann (PS) – 22:17	3–2
	3–3	27:26 – N. Jensen (M. Rahbek)
T. Richard – 63:27	4–3

12 min
Penalties
4 min
36
Shots
35

January 3, 2012; 11:00	United States	12–2 (4–0, 7–1, 1–1)	Latvia	Scotiabank Saddledome; Attendance: 9,146

Game reference

Jack Campbell
Goalies
Kristers Gudļevskis
Rihards Cimermanis
Referees:
(Canada) Devin Klein
(Sweden) Mikael Nord
Linesmen:
(Czech Republic) Jiří Gebauer
(Sweden) Johannes Käck

A. Watson (J. Tinordi, N. Bjugstad) – 05:40	1–0
A. Watson (J. Merrill, N. Bjugstad) – 11:53	2–0
A. Watson (K. Rau, J. Archibald) (PP) – 16:17	3–0
J. Zucker (B. Saad) (SH) – 18:47	4–0
J. Miller (J. Zucker, A. Clendening) (PP) – 20:46	5–0
N. Bjugstad (B. Saad, A. Watson) – 20:56	6–0
	6–1	22:03 – Z. Girgensons (K. Pelšs, T. Blugers)
B. Arnold (K. Rau) – 25:38	7–1
A. Clendening (A. Watson, B. Saad) – 32:08	8–1
K. Rau (A. Watson, J. Trouba) (PP) – 33:05	9–1
N. Bjugstad (A. Watson, S. Johns) – 35:30	10–1
N. Bjugstad (B. Saad, J. Merrill) (PP) – 36:41	11–1
A. Czarnik – 42:16	12–1
	12–2	53:25 – T. Blugers

6 min
Penalties
18 min
58
Shots
29

January 4, 2012; 11:00	Latvia	2–1 OT (0–1, 1–0, 0–0) (OT: 1–0)	Denmark	Scotiabank Saddledome; Attendance: 6,983

Game reference

Kristers Gudļevskis
Goalies
Sebastian Feuk
Referees:
(Sweden) Sören Persson
(United States) Thomas Sterns
Linesmen:
(Sweden) Johannes Käck
(Slovakia) Milan Novák

	0–1	03:21 – O. Bjorkstrand (T. Spelling)
K. Pelšs (N. Kolesnikovs, A. Salija) (PP) – 31:34	1–1
N. Jevpalovs (R. Lipsbergs) – 61:43	2–1

2 min
Penalties
2 min
31
Shots
23

January 4, 2012; 15:00	Switzerland	1–2 (1–2, 0–0, 0–0)	United States	Scotiabank Saddledome; Attendance: 10,624

Game reference

Tim Wolf
Goalies
Jack Campbell
Referees:
(Finland) Tom Laaksonen
(Czech Republic) Vladimír Šindler
Linesmen:
(Czech Republic) Jiří Gebauer
(Russia) Dmitry Sivov

	0–1	11:28 – A. Czarnik
G. Haas (J. Vermin, C. Hächler) – 14:49	1–1
	1–2	16:15 – K. Gravel (A. Clendening, T. Tynan)

10 min
Penalties
6 min
22
Shots
42

=== Final round ===
Bracket

Quarterfinals
A2	Russia (OT)	2
B3	Czech Republic	1
B2	Finland	8
A3	Slovakia	5

Semifinals
B1	Canada	5
A2	Russia	6
A1	Sweden (GWS)	3
B2	Finland	2

Final
A1	Sweden (OT)	1
A2	Russia	0
Third place
B2	Finland	0
B1	Canada	4

==== Quarterfinals ====
January 2, 2012; 15:00	Finland	8–5 (2–2, 4–1, 2–2)	Slovakia	Scotiabank Saddledome; Attendance: 14,558

Game reference

Sami Aittokallio
Goalies
Juraj Šimboch
Dominik Riečický
Referees:
(Russia) Vyacheslav Bulanov
(Switzerland) Brent Reiber
Linesmen:
(Switzerland) Nicolas Fluri
(Russia) Dmitry Sivov

J. Armia – 04:29	1–0
	1–1	14:24 – M. Chovan (R. Mráz)
R. Hämäläinen (M. Kuronen) – 14:32	2–1
	2–2	19:30 – M. Tvrdoň (M. Bubela, A. Jánošík) (PP)
Mi. Granlund (R. Ristolainen, T. Pulkkinen) (PP) – 25:32	3–2
Ma. Granlund (Mi. Granlund) – 26:46	4–2
Ma. Granlund (Mi. Granlund) – 29:53	5–2
A. Barkov (M. Aaltonen, R. Ristolainen) – 31:45	6–2
	6–3	33:36 – R. Mráz (M. Marinčin, M. Chovan)
	6–4	44:59 – M. Ďaloga (M. Daňo)
J. Donskoi (PP) – 52:51	7–4
T. Pulkkinen (Mi. Granlund, Ma. Granlund) (PP2) – 53:38	8–4
	8–5	59:30 – M. Daňo (R. Mráz, T. Jurčo)

8 min
Penalties
51 min
38
Shots
29

January 2, 2012; 19:00	Russia	2–1 OT (0–0, 1–1, 0–0) (OT: 1–0)	Czech Republic	Scotiabank Saddledome; Attendance: 16,681

Game reference

Andrei Vasilevski
Goalies
Petr Mrázek
Referees:
(Germany) Daniel Piechaczek
(Canada) Derek Zalaski
Linesmen:
(Canada) Chris Carlson
(Germany) Andre Schrader

	0–1	27:16 – J. Culek (T. Hertl, D. Jaškin)
D. Apalkov (S. Barbashev, Z. Arzamastsev) – 32:47	1–1
G. Zheldakov (N. Kucherov) – 61:30	2–1

4 min
Penalties
2 min
45
Shots
39

==== Semifinals ====
January 3, 2012; 15:00	Sweden	3–2 GWS (0–1, 0–1, 2–0) (OT 0–0) (SO: 2–1)	Finland	Scotiabank Saddledome; Attendance: 15,690

Game reference

Johan Gustafsson
Goalies
Sami Aittokallio
Referees:
(Switzerland) Brent Reiber
(Canada) Derek Zalaski
Linesmen:
(Canada) Chris Carlson
(Canada) Kiel Murchison

	0–1	18:29 – A. Ruuttu (M. Aaltonen, A. Barkov)
	0–2	35:30 – J. Armia
W. Karlsson (J. Larsson, M. Friberg) (PP) – 43:11	1–2
M. Friberg (J. Sundström) – 58:16	2–2

S. Collberg
M. Friberg
F. Forsberg (miss)
Shootout
J. Armia
(miss) J. Donskoi
(miss) Mi. Granlund
0 min
Penalties
16 min
58
Shots
24

January 3, 2012; 19:00	Canada	5–6 (0–2, 1–3, 4–1)	Russia	Scotiabank Saddledome; Attendance: 19,289

Game reference

Scott Wedgewood
Mark Visentin
Goalies
Andrei Vasilevskiy
Andrey Makarov
Referees:
(United States) Ian Croft
(Finland) Jyri Petteri Ronn
Linesmen:
(Germany) Andre Schrader
(United States) Christopher Woodworth

	0–1	7:26 – E. Kuznetsov (N. Yakupov)
	0–2	13:50 – N. Nesterov (G. Zheldakov) (PP)
B. Connolly (F. Hamilton, J. Huberdeau) – 22:37	1–2
	1–3	24:24 – E. Kuznetsov (A. Khokhlachev, N. Yakupov)
	1–4	28:48 – E. Kuznetsov (N. Yakupov, A. Sergeyev)
	1–5	30:30 – A. Khokhlachev (E. Kuznetsov, N. Yakupov) (PP)
	1–6	47:54 – N. Kucherov (M. Grigorenko)
D. Hamilton (M. Scheifele, R. Strome) (PP) – 49:20	2–6
J. Schwartz (B. Gallagher) – 49:43	3–6
B. Gallagher (D. Hamilton) – 51:59	4–6
B. Gormley (B. Gallagher) (PP) – 54:17	5–6

55 min
Penalties
16 min
56
Shots
24

==== Fifth place game ====
January 4, 2012; 19:00	Czech Republic	5–2 (3–0, 1–1, 1–1)	Slovakia	Scotiabank Saddledome; Attendance: 12,923

Game reference

Petr Mrázek
Goalies
Juraj Šimboch
Referees:
(Canada) Devin Klein
(Sweden) Mikael Nord
Linesmen:
(Switzerland) Nicolas Fluri
(Finland) Hannu Sormunen

R. Faksa (D. Krejčí) – 05:15	1–0
P. Holík (P. Straka, J. Sekáč) – 13:37	2–0
V. Mozík (D. Krejčí, P. Holík) (PP2) – 16:46	3–0
	3–1	34:17 – M. Bubela (M. Ďaloga)
D. Uher (T. Hertl) – 36:23	4–1
T. Filippi (V. Mozík, D. Uher) (PP) – 42:32	5–1
	5–2	46:24 – M. Chovan (M. Bubela)

6 min
Penalties
18 min
46
Shots
31

==== Bronze medal game ====
January 5, 2012; 13:30	Canada	4–0 (1–0, 2–0, 1–0)	Finland	Scotiabank Saddledome; Attendance: 18,595

Game reference

Mark Visentin
Goalies
Sami Aittokallio
Referees:
(Russia) Vyacheslav Bulanov
(United States) Ian Croft
Linesmen:
(Germany) Andre Schrader
(United States) Christopher Woodworth

T. Pearson (D. Hamilton, M. Scheifele) (PP) – 09:08	1–0
M. Scheifele (T. Pearson) – 25:35	2–0
Q. Howden (F. Hamilton, R. Murray) (PP) – 39:29	3–0
Q. Howden (M. Stone, F. Hamilton) – 57:35	4–0

8 min
Penalties
16 min
44
Shots
27

==== Final ====
January 5, 2012; 18:00	Sweden	1–0 OT (0–0, 0–0, 0–0) (OT: 1–0)	Russia	Scotiabank Saddledome; Attendance: 18,722

Game reference
Johan Gustafsson	Goalies	Andrey Makarov	Referees: (Switzerland) Brent Reiber (Canada) Derek Zalaski; Linesmen: (Canada) Chris Carlson (Canada) Kiel Murchison
M. Zibanejad (P. Nemeth) – 70:09 / Goals			Referees: (Switzerland) Brent Reiber (Canada) Derek Zalaski; Linesmen: (Canada) Chris Carlson (Canada) Kiel Murchison
4 min	Penalties	8 min	Referees: (Switzerland) Brent Reiber (Canada) Derek Zalaski; Linesmen: (Canada) Chris Carlson (Canada) Kiel Murchison
58	Shots	17	Referees: (Switzerland) Brent Reiber (Canada) Derek Zalaski; Linesmen: (Canada) Chris Carlson (Canada) Kiel Murchison

=== Statistics ===
==== Scoring leaders ====
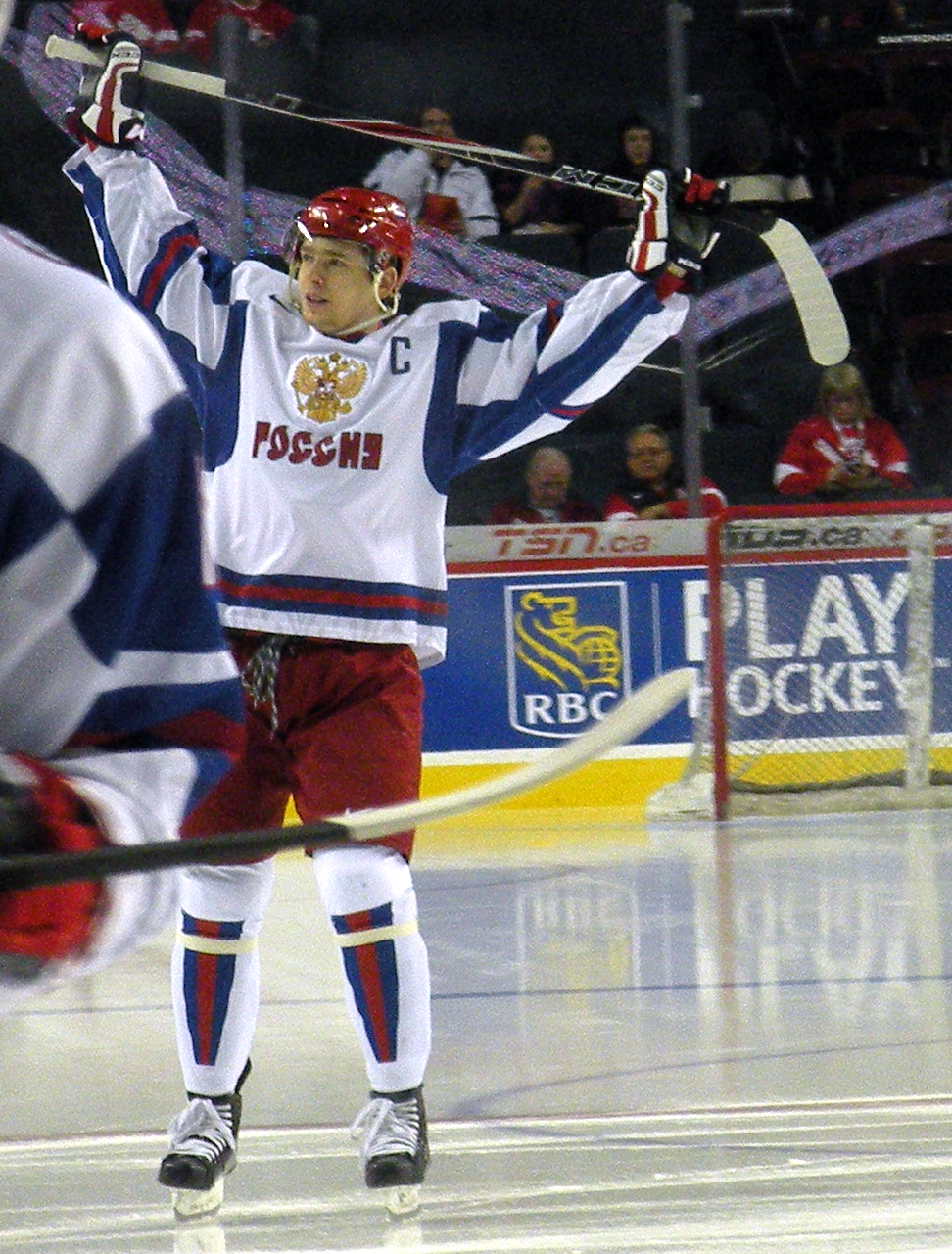
Evgeny Kuznetsov led the tournament with 13 points

Pos	Player	Country	GP	G	A	Pts	+/−	PIM
1	Evgeny Kuznetsov	Russia	7	6	7	13	+6	4
2	Max Friberg	Sweden	6	9	2	11	+4	22
3	Mikael Granlund	Finland	7	2	9	11	+4	0
4	Mark Stone	Canada	6	7	3	10	+10	2
5	Teemu Pulkkinen	Finland	7	6	4	10	+4	2
6	Ryan Strome	Canada	6	3	6	9	+9	8
6	Austin Watson	United States	6	3	6	9	+6	0
8	Nikita Gusev	Russia	7	3	6	9	+5	0
9	Jonathan Huberdeau	Canada	6	1	8	9	+8	16
10	Nail Yakupov	Russia	7	0	9	9	+4	6

GP = Games played; G = Goals; A = Assists; Pts = Points; +/− = Plus/minus; PIM = Penalties In Minutes
Source: IIHF.com

==== Goaltending leaders ====
(minimum 40% team's total ice time)

Pos	Player	Country	TOI	GA	GAA	Sv%	SO
1	Andrei Vasilevski	Russia	298:31	10	2.01	95.31	2
2	Mark Visentin	Canada	200:08	5	1.43	94.38	1
3	Sami Aittokallio	Finland	310:00	13	2.52	93.69	1
4	Petr Mrázek	Czech Republic	361:30	15	2.49	92.79	1
5	Scott Wedgewood	Canada	148:48	6	2.42	91.55	1

TOI = Time on ice (minutes:seconds); SA = Shots against; GA = Goals against; GAA = Goals against average; Sv% = Save percentage; SO = Shutouts
Source: IIHF.com

=== Tournament awards ===
Most Valuable Player

- Forward: (Russia) Evgeny Kuznetsov

All-star team

- Goaltender: (Czech Republic) Petr Mrázek
- Defencemen: (Canada) Brandon Gormley, (Sweden) Oscar Klefbom
- Forwards: (Russia) Evgeny Kuznetsov, (Sweden) Max Friberg, (Finland) Mikael Granlund

IIHF best player awards

- Goaltender: (Czech Republic) Petr Mrázek
- Defenceman: (Canada) Brandon Gormley
- Forward: (Russia) Evgeny Kuznetsov

=== Final standings ===
Rank	Team
1st place, gold medalist(s)	Sweden
2nd place, silver medalist(s)	Russia
3rd place, bronze medalist(s)	Canada
4th	Finland
5th	Czech Republic
6th	Slovakia
7th	United States
8th	Switzerland
9th	Latvia
10th	Denmark

Relegated to the 2013 Division I A

2012 Junior Ice Hockey World champions

Sweden
Second title

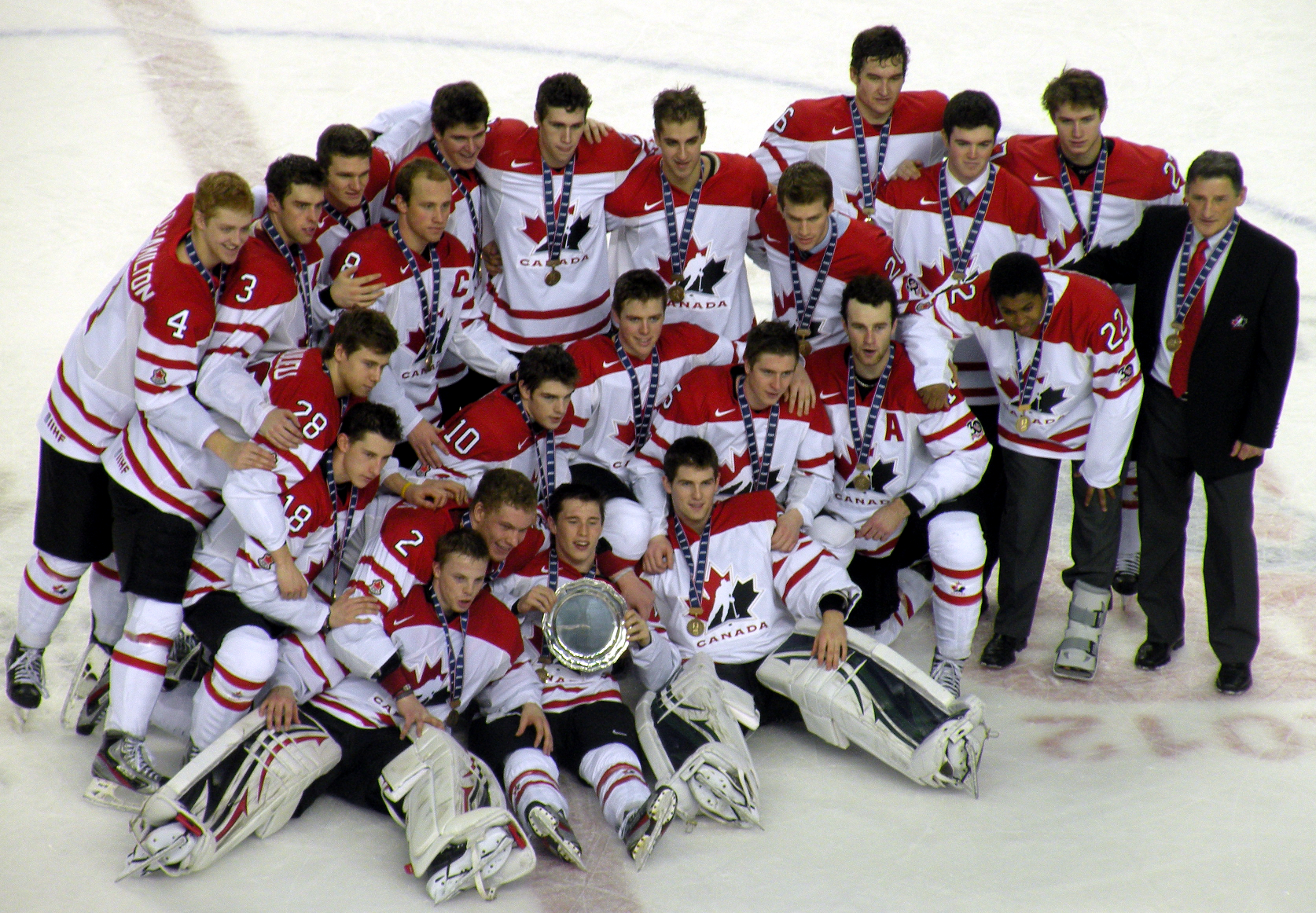
Canada poses for a team photo after winning the bronze medal

=== Medalists ===
Gold	Silver	Bronze
Sweden #1 – Anton Forsberg #5 – Mattias Bäckman #6 – Oscar Klefbom #7 – Fredrik Claesson #8 – Petter Granberg #9 – John Klingberg #10 – Johan Larsson (C) #11 – Jeremy Boyce-Rotevall #12 – Patrik Nemeth #13 – Johan Sundström (A) #14 – Max Friberg #15 – Sebastian Collberg #16 – Filip Forsberg #17 – William Karlsson #18 – Victor Rask #19 – Joakim Nordström (A) #20 – Mika Zibanejad #23 – Ludvig Rensfeldt #24 – Rickard Rakell #25 – Jonas Brodin #28 – Erik Thorell #30 – Johan Gustafsson #35 – Johan Mattsson	Russia #1 – Sergei Kostenko #3 – Artyom Sergeyev #4 – Viktor Antipin #6 – Mikhail Naumenkov #7 – Igor Ozhiganov #8 – Nikita Gusev #9 – Nikita Kucherov #10 – Nail Yakupov #12 – Grigori Zheldakov #14 – Danil Apalkov (A) #15 – Pavel Kulikov #16 – Ignat Zemchenko #17 – Mikhail Grigorenko #18 – Yaroslav Kosov #19 – Alexander Khokhlachev #20 – Andrey Makarov #22 – Sergei Barbashev #23 – Ivan Telegin #24 – Zakhar Arzamastsev (A) #25 – Yevgeni Kuznetsov (C) #26 – Ildar Isangulov #29 – Nikita Nesterov #30 – Andrei Vasilevski	Canada #2 – Jamie Oleksiak #3 – Brandon Gormley (A) #4 – Dougie Hamilton #5 – Mark Pysyk #6 – Scott Harrington #8 – Jaden Schwartz (C) #10 – Michaël Bournival #11 – Jonathan Huberdeau #12 – Brendan Gallagher #13 – Freddie Hamilton #14 – Brett Connolly (A) #15 – Tanner Pearson #16 – Mark Stone #18 – Ryan Strome #19 – Mark Scheifele #20 – Boone Jenner #21 – Quinton Howden (A) #22 – Devante Smith-Pelly (A) #27 – Ryan Murray #28 – Nathan Beaulieu #29 – Mark Visentin #30 – Scott Wedgewood

=== Gold medal celebration ===
Sweden's gold medal win was their first since 1981, as well as their second gold medal in total. The gold medal was celebrated on January 7, 2012, in front of over 6,000 fans at Kungsträdgården in Stockholm.

== Division I ==
=== Division I A ===
The Division I A tournament was played in Garmisch-Partenkirchen, Germany, from December 11 to December 17, 2011.

Pos	Team	Pld	W	OTW	OTL	L	GF	GA	GD	Pts	Promotion or relegation
1	Germany (H)	5	5	0	0	0	34	9	+25	15	Promoted to the 2013 Top Division
2	Belarus	5	3	0	1	1	21	10	+11	10	
3	Norway	5	3	0	0	2	19	13	+6	9	
4	Slovenia	5	1	2	0	2	16	12	+4	7	
5	Austria	5	1	0	1	3	11	26	−15	4	
6	Great Britain	5	0	0	0	5	6	37	−31	0	Relegated to the 2013 Division I B

Source: IIHF
(H) Host

=== Division I B ===
The Division I B tournament was played in Tychy, Poland, from December 12 to December 18, 2011.

Pos	Team	Pld	W	OTW	OTL	L	GF	GA	GD	Pts	Promotion or relegation
1	France	5	4	0	0	1	19	6	+13	12	Promoted to the 2013 Division I A
2	Kazakhstan	5	3	0	1	1	9	7	+2	10	
3	Italy	5	2	1	0	2	14	9	+5	8	
4	Poland (H)	5	2	0	1	2	16	12	+4	7	
5	Croatia	5	2	0	0	3	12	25	−13	6	
6	Japan	5	0	1	0	4	9	20	−11	2	Relegated to the 2013 Division II A

Source: IIHF
(H) Host

== Division II ==
=== Division II A ===
The Division II A tournament was played in Donetsk, Ukraine, from December 12 to December 18, 2011.

Pos	Team	Pld	W	OTW	OTL	L	GF	GA	GD	Pts	Promotion or relegation
1	Ukraine (H)	5	3	2	0	0	24	10	+14	13	Promoted to the 2013 Division I B
2	Lithuania	5	3	0	2	0	19	11	+8	11	
3	Hungary	5	2	1	0	2	24	15	+9	8	
4	Spain	5	2	0	0	3	14	22	−8	6	
5	Netherlands	5	1	1	0	3	9	23	−14	5	
6	South Korea	5	0	0	2	3	9	18	−9	2	Relegated to the 2013 Division II B

Source: IIHF
(H) Host

=== Division II B ===
The Division II B tournament was played in Tallinn, Estonia, from 10 to 16 December 2011.

Pos	Team	Pld	W	OTW	OTL	L	GF	GA	GD	Pts	Promotion or relegation
1	Romania	5	5	0	0	0	44	9	+35	15	Promoted to the 2013 Division II A
2	Estonia (H)	5	4	0	0	1	51	14	+37	12	
3	Serbia	5	3	0	0	2	18	26	−8	9	
4	Belgium	5	1	1	0	3	17	23	−6	5	
5	Australia	5	1	0	0	4	12	36	−24	3	
6	Mexico	5	0	0	1	4	5	39	−34	1	Relegated to the 2013 Division III

Source: IIHF
(H) Host

== Division III ==
The Division III tournament was played in Dunedin, New Zealand, from January 16 to January 22, 2012. Although originally scheduled to participate, North Korea withdrew from the tournament for unspecified reasons.

Pos	Team	Pld	W	OTW	OTL	L	GF	GA	GD	Pts	Promotion
1	Iceland	4	4	0	0	0	30	2	+28	12	Promoted to the 2013 Division II B
2	China	4	3	0	0	1	26	10	+16	9	
3	New Zealand (H)	4	2	0	0	2	19	14	+5	6	
4	Bulgaria	4	1	0	0	3	7	19	−12	3	
5	Turkey	4	0	0	0	4	1	38	−37	0	

Source: IIHF
(H) Host

Preceded by 2011 World Juniors	World Junior Ice Hockey Championships; 2012; See also: 2012 World Championships	Succeeded by 2013 World Juniors
