= Kuronen =

Kuronen is a Finnish surname. Notable people with the surname include:

- Juho Kuronen (born 1982), Finnish ice hockey player
- Mikael Kuronen (born 1992), Finnish ice hockey player
- Olavi Kuronen (1923–1989), Finnish ski jumper
