= 2017 Deutschland Cup =

Tournament details
- Host country: Germany
- Venue: 1 (in 1 host city)
- Dates: 10–12 November
- Teams: 4

Final positions
- Champions: Russia (3rd title)
- Runners-up: Slovakia
- Third place: Germany
- Fourth place: United States

Tournament statistics
- Games played: 6
- Goals scored: 35 (5.83 per game)
- Attendance: 32,048 (5,341 per game)
- Scoring leader: (Russia) Artyom Fyodorov (6 points)

Official website
- Website

The 2017 Deutschland Cup was the 28th edition of the tournament.

== Standings ==
Pos	Team	Pld	W	OTW	OTL	L	GF	GA	GD	Pts
1	Russia	3	3	0	0	0	17	6	+11	9
2	Slovakia	3	2	0	0	1	7	5	+2	6
3	Germany	3	1	0	0	2	7	12	−5	3
4	United States	3	0	0	0	3	4	12	−8	0

Source: IIHF
Rules for classification: 1) points; 2) head-to-head points; 3) head-to-head goal difference; 4) head-to-head number of goals scored.

== Results ==
All times are local (UTC+1).

10 November 2017; 16:00	United States	1–2 (0–1, 0–1, 1–0)	Slovakia	Curt Frenzel Stadium, Augsburg; Attendance: 4,220

Game reference

Ryan Zapolski
David Leggio
Goalies
Ján Laco
Referees:
(Germany) Daniel Piechaczek
(Germany) André Schrader
Linesmen:
(Germany) Gabriel Gaube
(Germany) Marius Wölzmüller

	0–1	05:24 – Lamper (Romančík, Marcinko)
	0–2	26:05 – Hovorka (Bezúch)
Sanguinetti (Blum, Roe) – 53:31	1–2

16 min
Penalties
8 min
36
Shots
16

10 November 2017; 19:30	Germany	2–8 (1–1, 1–4, 0–3)	Russia	Curt Frenzel Stadium, Augsburg; Attendance: 5,050

Game reference

Dennis Endras
Timo Pielmeier
Goalies
Vasily Koshechkin
Referees:
(United States) Timothy Mayer
(Germany) Marian Rohatsch
Linesmen:
(Germany) Kilian Hinterdobler
(Germany) Lukas Kohlmüller

	0–1	06:52 – Fyodorov (Naumenkov, Ozhiganov)
Pietta (Seidenberg, Kink) – 13:30	1–1
Raedeke (Kink, Pietta) (PP) – 21:58	2–1
	2–2	31:41 – Kablukov
	2–3	32:43 – Okulov
	2–4	36:39 – Kagarlitsky (Mikheyev, Karpov) (PP)
	2–5	37:58 – Naumenkov (Fyodorov, Karpov) (PP2)
	2–6	51:33 – Shumakov (Ozhiganov, Kablukov)
	2–7	52:54 – Mikheyev (Kagarlitsky)
	2–8	57:04 – Yakovlev (Shumakov)

10 min
Penalties
6 min
30
Shots
35

11 November 2017; 16:00	Germany	0–3 (0–1, 0–0, 0–2)	Slovakia	Curt Frenzel Stadium, Augsburg; Attendance: 6,139

Game reference

Timo Pielmeier
Goalies
Patrik Rybár
Referees:
(Germany) Lasse Kopitz
(United States) Timothy Mayer
Linesmen:
(Germany) Gabriel Gaube
(Germany) Tobias Schwenk

0–1	04:06 – Bakoš (Haščák, Bubela) (PP)
0–2	47:15 – Haščák (Bubela) (PP)
0–3	59:37– Čerešňák (ENG)

10 min
Penalties
10 min
23
Shots
21

11 November 2017; 19:30	Russia	5–2 (0–2, 3–0, 2–0)	United States	Curt Frenzel Stadium, Augsburg; Attendance: 6,139

Game reference

Alexander Yeryomenko
Goalies
Brandon Maxwell
Referees:
(Germany) Daniel Piechaczek
(Germany) Marian Rohatsch
Linesmen:
(Germany) Lukas Kohlmüller
(Germany) Marius Wölzmüller

	0–1	00:50 – Acrobello (Gunderson, Kolarik) (PP)
	0–2	12:28 – Kolarik (Acrobello, Stoa)
Yarullin (Prokhorkin, Kagarlitsky) (PP2) – 33:51	1–2
Naumenkov (Fyodorov, Karpov) (PP) – 35:16	2–2
Karpov (Naumenkov, Fyodorov) (PP) – 37:34	3–2
Mikheyev (Kagarlitsky, Prokhorkin) – 47:29	4–2
Tikhonov (Yeryomenko) (SH, ENG) – 59:48	5–2

35 min
Penalties
8 min
25
Shots
32

12 November 2017; 13:15	Slovakia	2–4 (0–1, 2–2, 0–1)	Russia	Curt Frenzel Stadium, Augsburg; Attendance: 5,190

Game reference

Marek Čiliak
Goalies
Vasily Koshechkin
Referees:
(Germany) Lasse Kopitz
(Germany) André Schrader
Linesmen:
(Germany) Kilian Hinterdobler
(Germany) Tobias Schwenk

	0–1	03:17 – Makeyev (Khokhlachev, Osnovin)
Haščák (Bakoš) (PP2) – 24:28	1–1
Ďaloga (Paulovič, Krištof) (PP2) – 25:39	2–1
	2–2	32:22 – Makeyev (Khokhlachev, Fyodorov)
	2–3	38:57 – Makeyev (Fyodorov, Osnovin)
	2–4	58:29 – Makeyev (Naumenkov) (PP)

8 min
Penalties
14 min
32
Shots
37

12 November 2017; 16:45	Germany	5–1 (1–0, 3–1, 1–0)	United States	Curt Frenzel Stadium, Augsburg; Attendance: 5,310

Game reference

Danny aus den Birken
Goalies
Ryan Zapolski
Referees:
(United States) Timothy Mayer
(Germany) Daniel Piechaczek
Linesmen:
(Germany) Gabriel Gaube
(Germany) Lukas Kohlmüller

Mauer (Müller) – 03:05	1–0
Raedeke (Mauer, Kahun) – 23:03	2–0
Macek (Seidenberg, Kahun) (PP) – 32:16	3–0
Holzmann (Pietta) – 33:59	4–0
	4–1	37:55 – Little (Roe, Sexston)
Seidenberg (ENG) – 57:16	5–1

8 min
Penalties
4 min
19
Shots
28
