= Vermeille =

Vermeille may refer to:

- Prix Vermeille, French long-distance horse race
- Mike Vermeille (born 1992), Swiss ice hockey player

== See also ==
- Vermeil (disambiguation)
