= Schneuwly =

Schneuwly is a Swiss surname. Notable people with the surname include:

- Cédric Schneuwly (born 1992), Swiss ice hockey player
- Christian Schneuwly (born 1988), Swiss football player, brother of Marco
- Marco Schneuwly (born 1985), Swiss football player
