= Nikita Soshnikov =

Russian ice hockey player (born 1993)

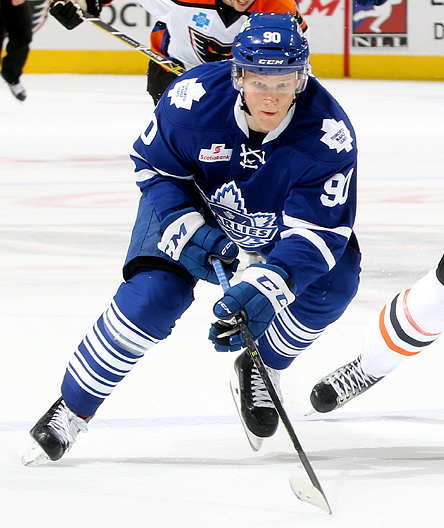
- Soshnikov with the Toronto Marlies in 2015
- Born: 14 October 1993 (age 32) Nizhny Tagil, Russia
- Height: 5 ft 11 in (180 cm)
- Weight: 185 lb (84 kg; 13 st 3 lb)
- Position: Right wing
- Shoots: Left
- KHL team Former teams: Traktor Chelyabinsk; Atlant Moscow Oblast; Toronto Maple Leafs; St. Louis Blues; Salavat Yulaev Ufa; CSKA Moscow; Avangard Omsk; New York Islanders; Admiral Vladivostok; Sibir Novosibirsk
- National team: Russia
- NHL draft: Undrafted
- Playing career: 2013–present

Nikita Dmitriyevich Soshnikov (Russian: Никита Дмитриевич Сошников; born 14 October 1993) is a Russian professional ice hockey forward for Traktor Chelyabinsk of the Kontinental Hockey League (KHL).

== Playing career ==
=== Atlant Moscow Oblast ===
After playing youth hockey with Sputnik Nizhny Tagil, Soshnikov was chosen in the sixth round, 123rd overall of the 2010 KHL Draft by Atlant Moscow Oblast. He made his professional debut with the MHL affiliate of Atlant Moscow Oblast during the 2010–11 season. Soshnikov made his Kontinental Hockey League (KHL) debut playing with Atlant Moscow Oblast during the 2013–14 KHL season. Soshnikov played two seasons with Atlant, scoring two goals and five points in 37 games in his rookie campaign before continuing his development with 14 goals and 18 assists in the 2014–15 season.

=== Toronto Maple Leafs ===
Upon completion of his second season in the KHL, on 20 March 2015, Soshnikov decided to move to North America to play in the NHL, signing as an undrafted free agent to a three-year, entry-level contract with the Toronto Maple Leafs.

Soshnikov made his NHL debut on 29 February 2016 against the Tampa Bay Lightning. He scored his first NHL goal on 2 March 2016 against Philipp Grubauer of the Washington Capitals.

Soshnikov started the 2017–18 season with the Toronto Marlies; however, there was a clause in Soshnikov's contract that stipulated he must be called up to the Leafs by 14 November 2017, or else he would be allowed to head to the KHL. He was called up just before the clause kicked in. In addition to this, he is now no longer waiver-exempt, meaning he would have to clear through waivers if he were to be sent back down to the AHL However, a logjam of players meant Soshnikov saw limited action. On 1 February 2018, Soshnikov was assigned to the Marlies for a conditioning stint. On 12 February 2018, it was announced that Soshnikov would be recalled from the Marlies, but would remain on the injured reserve.

=== St. Louis Blues ===
Still passed on the depth chart, rumors began to circulate throughout February that Soshnikov was likely to be traded. On 15 February 2018, it was announced that Soshnikov had been traded to the St. Louis Blues for a fourth-round pick in the 2019 NHL entry draft.

=== Return to Russia ===
As an impending restricted free agent from the Blues and unable to cement a role within the NHL team following an injury plagued 2018–19 season, Soshnikov opted to return to Russia to hone his game in the KHL. On 3 June 2019, his rights were traded from SKA Saint Petersburg to Salavat Yulaev Ufa in exchange for the rights to Vladimir Tkachev. He immediately agreed to a two-year contract with the club.

During his final year under contract with Salavat Yulaev Ufa in the 2020–21 season, Soshnikov registered 17 points through 21 regular season games before he was traded to HC CSKA Moscow in exchange for Mikhail Naumenkov on 28 November 2020.

=== New York Islanders ===
Following three seasons in the KHL, Soshnikov opted to return for another shot at the NHL in the 2022–23 season, in agreeing to a one-year, $750,000 contract with the New York Islanders on 22 September 2022. Remaining on the Islanders roster to open the season, Soshnikov primarily served as a healthy scratch and featured in just three games before he was placed on waivers and re-assigned to AHL affiliate, the Bridgeport Islanders. After four games in the AHL, on 19 December, Soshnikov cleared unconditional waivers, resulting in the mutual termination of his contract with the Islanders.

=== Return to KHL ===
On 20 December 2022, as a free agent, Soshnikov signed a two-year contract through the 2023–24 season in a return to the KHL with Traktor Chelyabinsk.

After a productive lone season with Admiral Vladivostok, Soshnikov was signed to a two-year contract with divisional rival, HC Sibir Novosibirsk on 2 June 2025.

== Career statistics ==
=== Regular season and playoffs ===
			Regular season					Playoffs
Season	Team	League	GP	G	A	Pts	PIM	GP	G	A	Pts	PIM
2010–11	Atlant Moscow Oblast	MHL	48	17	10	27	14	6	0	1	1	6
2011–12	Atlant Moscow Oblast	MHL	47	14	20	34	12	11	1	4	5	25
2012–13	Atlant Moscow Oblast	MHL	59	38	34	72	47	8	5	4	9	6
2013–14	Atlant Moscow Oblast	MHL	10	5	8	13	4	2	2	0	2	0
2013–14	Atlant Moscow Oblast	KHL	33	2	3	5	27	—	—	—	—	—
2013–14	Buran Voronezh	VHL	4	2	2	4	0	—	—	—	—	—
2014–15	Atlant Moscow Oblast	KHL	57	14	18	32	22	—	—	—	—	—
2015–16	Toronto Marlies	AHL	52	18	10	28	18	11	5	2	7	4
2015–16	Toronto Maple Leafs	NHL	11	2	3	5	6	—	—	—	—	—
2016–17	Toronto Marlies	AHL	6	1	2	3	6	—	—	—	—	—
2016–17	Toronto Maple Leafs	NHL	56	5	4	9	16	—	—	—	—	—
2017–18	Toronto Maple Leafs	NHL	3	0	0	0	0	—	—	—	—	—
2017–18	Toronto Marlies	AHL	19	7	10	17	12	—	—	—	—	—
2017–18	St. Louis Blues	NHL	15	1	1	2	4	—	—	—	—	—
2018–19	San Antonio Rampage	AHL	11	3	3	6	4	—	—	—	—	—
2018–19	St. Louis Blues	NHL	5	0	0	0	0	—	—	—	—	—
2019–20	Salavat Yulaev Ufa	KHL	58	27	21	48	28	—	—	—	—	—
2020–21	Salavat Yulaev Ufa	KHL	21	4	13	17	6	—	—	—	—	—
2020–21	CSKA Moscow	KHL	25	4	5	9	10	13	0	3	3	4
2021–22	CSKA Moscow	KHL	11	0	1	1	6	—	—	—	—	—
2021–22	Avangard Omsk	KHL	22	4	11	15	8	13	5	3	8	31
2022–23	New York Islanders	NHL	3	0	0	0	0	—	—	—	—	—
2022–23	Bridgeport Islanders	AHL	4	0	1	1	0	—	—	—	—	—
2022–23	Traktor Chelyabinsk	KHL	22	8	6	14	17	—	—	—	—	—
2023–24	Traktor Chelyabinsk	KHL	67	10	17	27	25	11	1	2	3	4
2024–25	Admiral Vladivostok	KHL	57	22	19	41	25	5	3	2	5	2
2025–26	Sibir Novosibirsk	KHL	20	2	9	11	2	—	—	—	—	—
2025–26	Admiral Vladivostok	KHL	31	5	8	13	18	—	—	—	—	—
KHL totals			424	102	131	233	194	42	9	10	19	41
NHL totals			90	8	8	16	26	—	—	—	—	—

=== International ===
Year	Team	Event	Result	GP	G	A	Pts	PIM
2018	Russia	WC	6th	4	0	3	3	0
Senior totals				4	0	3	3	0
