= Jannik Christensen =

Danish professional ice hockey player

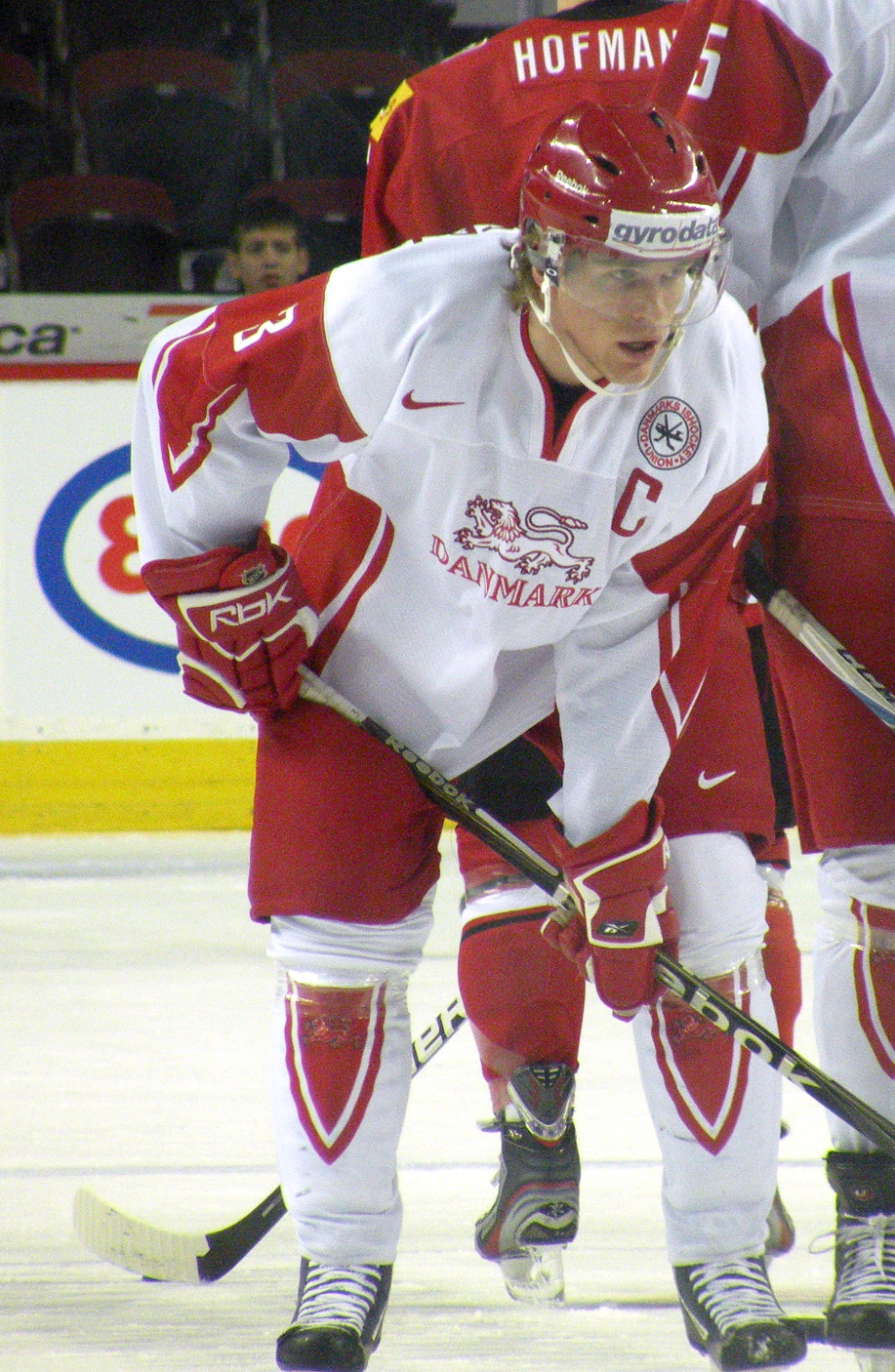
- Born: June 9, 1992 (age 32); Esbjerg, Denmark
- Height: 6 ft 0 in (183 cm)
- Weight: 183 lb (83 kg; 13 st 1 lb)
- Position: Defence
- Shoots: Left
- Metal team Former teams: Esbjerg Energy; Frölunda HC; Quad City Mallards
- NHL draft: Undrafted
- Playing career: 2007–present

Jannik Christensen (born June 9, 1992) is a Danish professional ice hockey player who is currently with Esbjerg Energy of the Metal Ligaen (DEN). He played with Frölunda HC in the Swedish Elitserien during the 2010–11 Elitserien season before returning to his Danish team Esbjerg Energy.

After establishing himself in three further years in Esbjerg, Christensen opted to attempt a North American career, signing a one-year contract with the Quad City Mallards of the then Central Hockey League on July 31, 2014. With the CHL ceasing operations prior to the season, Christensen remained with the club as it transferred to the ECHL. He returned within the Esbjerg organization the following season.

== Career statistics ==
=== Regular season and playoffs ===
			Regular season					Playoffs
Season	Team	League	GP	G	A	Pts	PIM	GP	G	A	Pts	PIM
2007–08	EfB Ishockey	DEN	17	0	2	2	8	—	—	—	—	—
2008–09	EfB Ishockey	DEN	19	0	0	0	35	—	—	—	—	—
2009–10	EfB Ishockey	DEN	33	0	4	4	30	5	0	0	0	4
2010–11	Frölunda HC	J20	34	0	11	11	34	7	0	1	1	0
2010–11	Frölunda HC	SEL	2	0	0	0	0	—	—	—	—	—
2011–12	EfB Ishockey	DEN	36	2	8	10	46	5	1	1	2	4
2012–13	EfB Ishockey	DEN	40	2	4	6	18	6	0	0	0	16
2013–14	Esbjerg Energy	DEN	40	3	10	13	38	5	0	0	0	8
2014–15	Quad City Mallards	ECHL	62	1	13	14	62	1	0	0	0	0
2015–16	Esbjerg Energy	DEN	31	2	9	11	65	14	1	0	1	6
2016–17	Esbjerg Energy	DEN	34	0	8	8	54	3	0	0	0	0
2017–18	Esbjerg Energy	DEN	49	1	3	4	96
Denmark totals			299	10	48	58	390	38	2	1	3	38

=== International ===
Year	Team	Event	Result	GP	G	A	Pts	PIM
2010	Denmark	WJC18-D1	12th	5	1	3	4	6
2010	Denmark	WJC-D1	13th	5	0	0	0	14
2011	Denmark	WJC-D1	12th	5	0	1	1	2
2012	Denmark	WJC	10th	6	0	1	1	6
Junior totals				21	1	5	6	28
