= Daniil Apalkov =

Russian ice hockey player (born 1992)

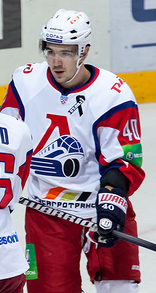
- Born: January 1, 1992 (age 33); Magnitogorsk, Russia
- Height: 6 ft 1 in (185 cm)
- Weight: 198 lb (90 kg; 14 st 2 lb)
- Position: Forward
- Shoots: Left
- KHL team Former teams: Free agent Metallurg Magnitogorsk; Lokomotiv Yaroslavl; Dynamo Moscow; HC Sochi; Barys Astana
- Playing career: 2011–present

Medal record

Ice hockey

Representing Russia

World Junior A Challenge
Bronze medal – third place	2009 Summerside	

Representing Russia

World Junior Championships
Silver medal – second place	2012 Canada	

Daniil Apalkov (born January 1, 1992) is a Russian professional ice hockey player. He is currently an unrestricted free agent who most recently played with Barys Astana in the Kontinental Hockey League (KHL).

== Playing career ==
During the 2010–11 KHL season, Apalkov played eight games with Metallurg Magnitogorsk in the KHL. During the 2013–14 season, on December 24, 2013, Apalkov was signed to a four-year contract extension to remain with Lokomotiv Yaroslavl.

Apalkov played eight seasons with Lokomotiv, and while in his final season under contract in 2019–20, he split the campaign between Yaroslavl and Dynamo Moscow. With the playoffs cancelled after completion of the first-round due to the COVID-19 pandemic, Apalkov left the club as a free agent.

On 15 May 2020, Apalkov joined his fourth KHL club, agreeing to a one-year contract with HC Sochi.

As a free agent from Sochi, Apalkov returned to original club, Metallurg Magnitogorsk, on a one-year deal on 8 August 2021.

== Career statistics ==
=== Regular season and playoffs ===
			Regular season					Playoffs
Season	Team	League	GP	G	A	Pts	PIM	GP	G	A	Pts	PIM
2009–10	Stalnye Lisy	MHL	45	18	18	36	12	5	3	1	4	4
2010–11	Metallurg Magnitogorsk	KHL	8	0	0	0	2	—	—	—	—	—
2010–11	Stalnye Lisy	MHL	47	22	38	60	16	17	4	12	16	4
2011–12	Stalnye Lisy	MHL	24	16	17	33	14	—	—	—	—	—
2011–12	Loko	MHL	6	3	1	4	4	—	—	—	—	—
2011–12	Lokomotiv Yaroslavl	VHL	17	4	5	9	2	10	3	3	6	0
2012–13	Loko	MHL	2	0	2	2	0	—	—	—	—	—
2012–13	Lokomotiv Yaroslavl	VHL	5	1	3	4	2	—	—	—	—	—
2012–13	Lokomotiv Yaroslavl	KHL	49	7	6	13	0	5	1	1	2	4
2013–14	Lokomotiv Yaroslavl	KHL	54	11	18	29	12	18	1	2	3	4
2014–15	Lokomotiv Yaroslavl	KHL	59	9	15	24	16	6	2	0	2	0
2015–16	Lokomotiv Yaroslavl	KHL	59	16	27	43	46	5	1	2	3	2
2016–17	Lokomotiv Yaroslavl	KHL	53	7	10	17	14	15	2	1	3	6
2017–18	Lokomotiv Yaroslavl	KHL	55	15	10	25	32	9	0	1	1	13
2018–19	Lokomotiv Yaroslavl	KHL	58	8	16	24	35	11	4	1	5	2
2019–20	Lokomotiv Yaroslavl	KHL	31	1	4	5	10	—	—	—	—	—
2019–20	Dynamo Moscow	KHL	6	0	0	0	0	—	—	—	—	—
2020–21	HC Sochi	KHL	15	0	1	1	4	—	—	—	—	—
2021–22	Yermak Angarsk	VHL	41	5	23	28	22	—	—	—	—	—
2021–22	TH Unia Oświęcim	PHL	4	1	5	6	0	15	2	5	7	0
2023–24	Saryarka Karaganda	KAZ	16	11	11	22	6	—	—	—	—	—
2023–24	Barys Astana	KHL	35	6	8	14	6	—	—	—	—	—
2024–25	Barys Astana	KHL	11	2	1	3	2	—	—	—	—	—
KHL totals			493	82	116	198	179	69	11	8	19	31

=== International ===
Year	Team	Event	Result	GP	G	A	Pts	PIM
2009	Russia	U17	7th	5	0	0	0	2
2010	Russia	WJC18	4th	7	0	0	0	6
2012	Russia	WJC	2nd place, silver medalist(s)	7	1	2	3	0
Junior totals				19	1	2	3	8
