= Pavel Kulikov =

Russian ice hockey player

- Born: 14 January 1992 (age 34) Nizhnekamsk, Russia
- Height: 6 ft 1 in (185 cm)
- Weight: 190 lb (86 kg; 13 st 8 lb)
- Position: Forward
- Shoots: Left
- VHL team Former teams: Neftyanik Almetievsk; Neftekhimik Nizhnekamsk; Avtomobilist Yekaterinburg; Avangard Omsk; Lada Togliatti; Yunost Minsk
- Playing career: 2011–present

Medal record

Ice hockey

Representing Russia

World Junior Championships
| Silver medal – second place | 2012 Canada | |

World Junior A Challenge
| Bronze medal – third place | 2009 Summerside | |

Pavel Kulikov (born 14 January 1992) is a Russian professional ice hockey forward who plays for Neftyanik Almetievsk in the Supreme Hockey League (VHL).

== Playing career ==
During the 2011–12 KHL season, Kulikov made his KHL debut playing in one game with HC Neftekhimik Nizhnekamsk. Prior to the 2018–19 season, Kulikov has spent the entirety of his professional career within the Neftekhimik Nizhnekamsk organization.

Following the 2019–20 season, his ninth season with Nizhnekamsk, Kulikov left as a free agent for the first time in his career, agreeing to a two-year contract with Avtomobilist Yekaterinburg on 5 May 2020.
