= Matúš Chovan =

Slovak ice hockey player

- Born: 14 February 1992 (age 33) Košice, Czechoslovakia
- Height: 6 ft 2 in (188 cm)
- Weight: 190 lb (86 kg; 13 st 8 lb)
- Position: Centre
- Shoots: Left
- Slovak 1. Liga team Former teams: HC 19 Humenné; HC Košice; HK Orange 20; HC 46 Bardejov; HC Prešov; HC '05 Banská Bystrica; Cracovia Kraków; HC 07 Detva; HK Spišská Nová Ves; HK Brezno
- NHL draft: Undrafted
- Playing career: 2010–present

Matúš Chovan (born 14 February 1992) is a Slovak ice hockey player who is currently playing for the HC 19 Humenné of the Slovak 1. Liga.

== Career ==
Chovan was playing junior ice hockey for his hometown club HC Košice. He made his Extraliga debut in the 2010–11 season. He was a member of the HK Orange 20 project for which played 21 games and earned 5 points.

== International play ==
Chovan participated at the 2012 World Junior Ice Hockey Championships, earning 6 points (5+1) in 6 games.

== Career statistics ==
=== Regular season and playoffs ===
			Regular season					Playoffs
Season	Team	League	GP	G	A	Pts	PIM	GP	G	A	Pts	PIM

=== International ===
Year	Team	Event	Result	GP	G	A	Pts	PIM
2012	Slovakia	WJC	6th	6	5	1	6	27
Junior totals				6	5	1	6	27
