= Ignat Zemchenko =

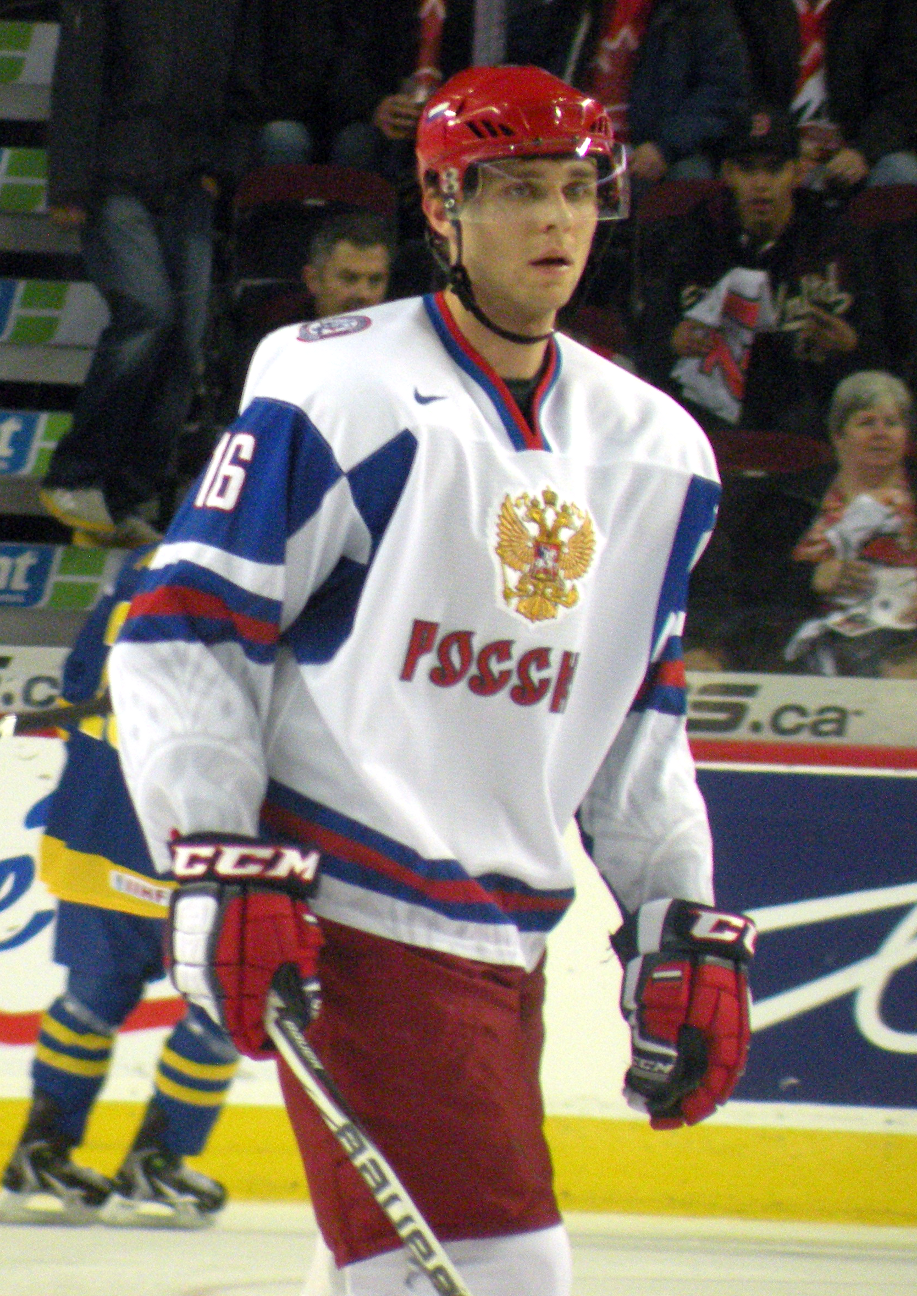
- Born: April 24, 1992 (age 32); Kyiv, Ukraine
- Height: 6 ft 2 in (188 cm)
- Weight: 214 lb (97 kg; 15 st 4 lb)
- Position: Forward
- Shoots: Left
- VHL team Former teams: HC Yugra; Severstal Cherepovets; Metallurg Novokuznetsk; HC Sibir Novosibirsk; HC Neftekhimik Nizhnekamsk
- Playing career: 2010–present

Medal record

Ice hockey

Representing Russia

World Junior A Challenge
Bronze medal – third place	2009 Summerside	

Representing Russia

World Junior Championships
Silver medal – second place	2012 Canada	

Ignat Zemchenko (Ukrainian: Іґнат Земченко, born April 24, 1992) is a Ukrainian-Russian professional ice hockey player currently playing with HC Yugra in the Supreme Hockey League (VHL). He was selected by Severstal Cherepovets 10th overall in the 2009 KHL Junior Draft, and made his KHL debut in the 2009–10 KHL season. He played for Russia in the 2012 IIHF World U20 Championship. Ignat Zemchenko is the son of Serhiy Zemchenko, a former Ukrainian professional ice hockey player known for his time with Sokil Kyiv.

== Playing career ==
Zemchenko began playing hockey in his birthplace Kyiv, Ukraine. Later on his father, Serhiy, left the country to coach hockey in Spain for seven years, causing the family to relocate; and where Ignat would continue to learn the game. In 2004 his father again relocated, this time to coach PHC Krylya Sovetov based in Moscow. Ignat too would join the Krylya Sovetov hockey system.

In the 2011-12 KHL season, Zemchenko's father, Serhiy, would act as coach of Almaz Cherepovets.

== International play ==
While both his father Serhiy and older brother Ihor have played internationally for Ukraine, Ignat chose to represent Russia instead, stating that while the option existed, he had "no desire to play on the Ukrainian team" because the career opportunity was greater in Russia. Zemchenko began playing for Russia internationally in the Under-16 4 Nations Tournament.
