= Grigory Zheldakov =

Russian ice hockey player

- Born: February 11, 1992 (age 33); Moscow, Russia
- Height: 6 ft 1 in (185 cm)
- Weight: 212 lb (96 kg; 15 st 2 lb)
- Position: Defence
- Shoots: Left
- UHL team Former teams: HC Donbass; Spartak Moscow; HC Yugra; Torpedo Nizhny Novgorod; Traktor Chelyabinsk; Admiral Vladivostok
- Playing career: 2010–present

Medal record

Representing Russia

Ice hockey

World Junior Championships
Silver medal – second place	2012 Canada	

Grigory Zheldakov (born February 11, 1992) is a Russian professional ice hockey defenceman who is currently playing with HC Donbass in the Ukrainian Hockey League (UHL).

Zheldakov first played with HC Spartak Moscow in the Kontinental Hockey League during the 2010–11 KHL season.
