= Mattias Bäckman =

Swedish ice hockey player (born 1992)

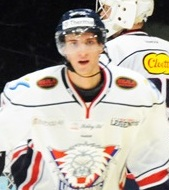
- Born: October 3, 1992 (age 34) Linköping, Sweden
- Height: 6 ft 2 in (188 cm)
- Weight: 170 lb (77 kg; 12 st 2 lb)
- Position: Defence
- Shoots: Left
- Played for: Linköping HC; Grand Rapids Griffins; Texas Stars; Hershey Bears; EHC Kloten
- NHL draft: 145th overall, 2011; Detroit Red Wings
- Playing career: 2010–present

Mattias Jonas Bäckman (born October 3, 1992) is a Swedish professional ice hockey defenceman. Bäckman was drafted 145th overall by the Detroit Red Wings in the 2011 NHL entry draft.

== Playing career ==
=== Swedish Hockey League ===
During the 2008–09 season, Bäckman debuted in Sweden’s SuperElit junior league with the Linköpings' J20 club, appearing in a pair of games without registering a point.

During the 2009–10 season, Bäckman spent the majority of the season with Linköpings J20, recording four goals and assists in 33 games in the regular season before adding one goal in six games in the playoffs. Bäckman also played in 5 contests with the big club in the Elitserien without registering a point.

During the 2010–11 season, Bäckman appeared in six Elitserien games with Linköpings and two games on loan to First Division team Mjolby. Bäckman scored one goal and two assists for Mjolby. Bäckman recorded two goals and 18 assists in 27 games with Linkopings U20 team and added 2 assists in three playoff games.

During the 2011–12 season, Bäckman skated in 42 games for Linköpings as a 19-year-old in his first professional season in Sweden's Elitserien. Bäckman recorded one goal and seven assists. Backman skated with Linkopings U20 team in six regular season games and was plus-two with one goal and one assist. Bäckman was with the U20 team during the run to the SuperElit finals after Linkopings' tenth-place men's team did not make the playoffs and was the team's second-leading scorer with two goals and six assists in six games.

During the 2012–13 season, Bäckman appeared in 52 games in his second season with Linköpings, where he recorded two goals and 24 assists. Linköpings finished fifth in the Elitserien and lost to league champion Skelleftea in the playoff semifinals. Backman recorded two goals and assists in 10 playoff games. Bäckman played five games for Sweden in the European Trophy tournament with no points nor penalty minutes.

During the 2013–14 season, Bäckman appeared in a career-high 54 games, where he recorded six goals and 15 assists during his third and final SEL season. During the playoffs, Bäckman helped Linköpings reach the semifinals, recording seven assists in 13 games.

=== North America ===
On May 21, 2013, Bäckman signed a three year entry-level contract with the Detroit Red Wings.

After Linköpings were eliminated from the playoffs, Bäckman was assigned to the Grand Rapids Griffins, and made his American Hockey League (AHL) debut on April 18, 2014, in a game against the Lake Erie Monsters. During the 2014 Calder Cup playoffs, Bäckman recorded one goal and five assists in 10 playoff games.

Bäckman began the 2014–15 season with the Griffins. In 18 games he recorded four assists. On December 26, 2014, the Griffins reassigned Bäckman to Linköpings HC. On March 1, 2015, the Detroit Red Wings traded Bäckman and Mattias Janmark-Nylén to the Dallas Stars in exchange for Erik Cole.

In the 2016–17 season, in his final year under contract with the Stars and stationed in the AHL with Texas, Bäckman appeared in 41 games with 11 points before he was loaned by the Stars to the Hershey Bears in exchange for Darren Dietz on March 8, 2017. He appeared in 5 games with the Bears before he was excluded from the post-season roster and left at the conclusion of the regular season. As expected he was not tendered a qualifying offer by the Stars at the conclusion of the season, releasing Bäckman to free agency.

=== Return to Europe ===
On June 30, 2017, Bäckman signed a one-year contract with EHC Kloten of the National League (NL). After completing the 2017–18 season with Kloten, Bäckman returned to Sweden agreeing to terms with Linköpings on a multi-year contract on April 27, 2018.

In the midst of the 2021–22 season, his fourth successive season blighted through injury with Linköping, Bäckman announced he was taking a hiatus from professional hockey in order to regain his health on 7 December 2021.

== International play ==
Medal record

Representing Sweden

Ice hockey

World Junior Championships
Gold medal – first place	2012 Calgary	

Bäckman represented Sweden at the 2010 World Junior A Challenge. Bäckman recorded one assist and four penalty minutes for fifth-place Sweden at the WJAC. Bäckman later represented Sweden at the 2012 World Junior Ice Hockey Championships, where he won a gold medal. In six games at the WJC, Bäckman recorded three assists.

== Career statistics ==
=== Regular season and playoffs ===
			Regular season					Playoffs
Season	Team	League	GP	G	A	Pts	PIM	GP	G	A	Pts	PIM
2009–10	Linköpings HC	SEL	5	0	0	0	2	—	—	—	—	—
2010–11	Linköpings HC	SEL	6	0	0	0	4	—	—	—	—	—
2011–12	Linköpings HC	SEL	42	1	7	8	14	—	—	—	—	—
2012–13	Linköpings HC	SEL	52	2	24	26	34	10	2	4	6	4
2013–14	Linköpings HC	SHL	54	6	15	21	16	13	0	7	7	6
2013–14	Grand Rapids Griffins	AHL	2	0	0	0	0	10	1	5	6	2
2014–15	Grand Rapids Griffins	AHL	18	0	4	4	6	—	—	—	—	—
2014–15	Linköpings HC	SHL	25	4	13	17	4	9	0	3	3	6
2014–15	Texas Stars	AHL	1	0	0	0	0	2	0	1	1	0
2015–16	Texas Stars	AHL	69	8	24	32	34	4	0	2	2	4
2016–17	Texas Stars	AHL	41	3	8	11	24	—	—	—	—	—
2016–17	Hershey Bears	AHL	5	1	1	2	2	—	—	—	—	—
2017–18	EHC Kloten	NL	41	3	9	12	14	—	—	—	—	—
2018–19	Linköpings HC	SHL	18	2	5	7	8	—	—	—	—	—
2019–20	Linköping HC	SHL	1	0	0	0	0	—	—	—	—	—
2020–21	Linköping HC	SHL	17	1	8	9	4	—	—	—	—	—
2021–22	Linköping HC	SHL	3	0	1	1	6	—	—	—	—	—
SHL totals			223	16	73	89	92	32	2	14	16	16
AHL totals			136	12	37	49	66	16	1	8	9	6

=== International ===
Year	Team	Event	Result	GP	G	A	Pts	PIM
2012	Sweden	WJC	1st place, gold medalist(s)	6	0	3	3	4
Junior totals				6	0	3	3	4
