= Matej Bene =

Slovak ice hockey player

- Born: April 11, 1992 (age 32); Nitra, Czechoslovakia
- Height: 6 ft 0 in (183 cm)
- Weight: 172 lb (78 kg; 12 st 4 lb)
- Position: Centre
- Caught: Right
- Played for: Kamloops Blazers; HK Nitra; HK Orange 20; MsHK Žilina; HK 36 Skalica; HC Topolcany
- NHL draft: Undrafted
- Playing career: 2010–2018

Matej Bene (born April 11, 1992) is a Slovak ice hockey player. He is currently a free agent having last played for HC Topolcany of the Slovak 1. Liga.

Bene made his European Elite debut during the 2010–11 season playing in the Slovak Extraliga with HK Nitra.

Bene participated at the 2012 World Junior Ice Hockey Championships as a member of Team Slovakia.

== Career statistics ==
| | | | Regular season | | | | | Playoffs |
| Season | Team | League | GP | G | A | Pts | PIM | GP | G | A | Pts | PIM |
|---|---|---|---|---|---|---|---|---|---|---|---|---|
| 2006–07 | HK Nitra U18 | Slovak U18 | 25 | 2 | 3 | 5 | 4 | — | — | — | — | — |
| 2007–08 | HK Nitra U18 | Slovak U18 | 44 | 20 | 20 | 40 | 34 | — | — | — | — | — |
| 2007–08 | HK Nitra U20 | Slovak U20 | 11 | 2 | 1 | 3 | 0 | — | — | — | — | — |
| 2008–09 | HK Nitra U18 | Slovak U18 | 2 | 1 | 0 | 1 | 6 | — | — | — | — | — |
| 2008–09 | HK Nitra U20 | Slovak U20 | 45 | 7 | 17 | 24 | 42 | — | — | — | — | — |
| 2009–10 | Kamloops Blazers | WHL | 59 | 5 | 9 | 14 | 42 | 4 | 0 | 1 | 1 | 0 |
| 2010–11 | HK Nitra U20 | Slovak U20 | 28 | 14 | 21 | 35 | 12 | 1 | 0 | 0 | 0 | 0 |
| 2010–11 | HK Nitra | Slovak | 1 | 0 | 0 | 0 | 0 | — | — | — | — | — |
| 2010–11 | HK Orange 20 | Slovak | 10 | 0 | 1 | 1 | 2 | — | — | — | — | — |
| 2011–12 | HK Nitra | Slovak | 12 | 2 | 3 | 5 | 4 | — | — | — | — | — |
| 2011–12 | HK Orange 20 | Slovak | 10 | 1 | 2 | 3 | 2 | — | — | — | — | — |
| 2011–12 | HK Orange 20 | Slovak2 | 11 | 4 | 8 | 12 | 8 | — | — | — | — | — |
| 2012–13 | HK Nitra | Slovak | 37 | 5 | 4 | 9 | 16 | — | — | — | — | — |
| 2013–14 | MsHK Zilina | Slovak | 15 | 0 | 2 | 2 | 4 | — | — | — | — | — |
| 2014–15 | HK 36 Skalica | Slovak | 48 | 1 | 1 | 2 | 20 | — | — | — | — | — |
| 2015–16 | HK Nitra | Slovak | 55 | 5 | 5 | 10 | 24 | 17 | 0 | 2 | 2 | 2 |
| 2016–17 | HK Nitra | Slovak | 22 | 1 | 1 | 2 | 2 | — | — | — | — | — |
| 2017–18 | HC Topolcany | Slovak2 | 1 | 0 | 0 | 0 | 0 | — | — | — | — | — |
| Slovak totals | | | 210 | 15 | 19 | 34 | 74 | 17 | 0 | 2 | 2 | 2 |
