= Erik Thorell =

Swedish ice hockey player (born 1992)

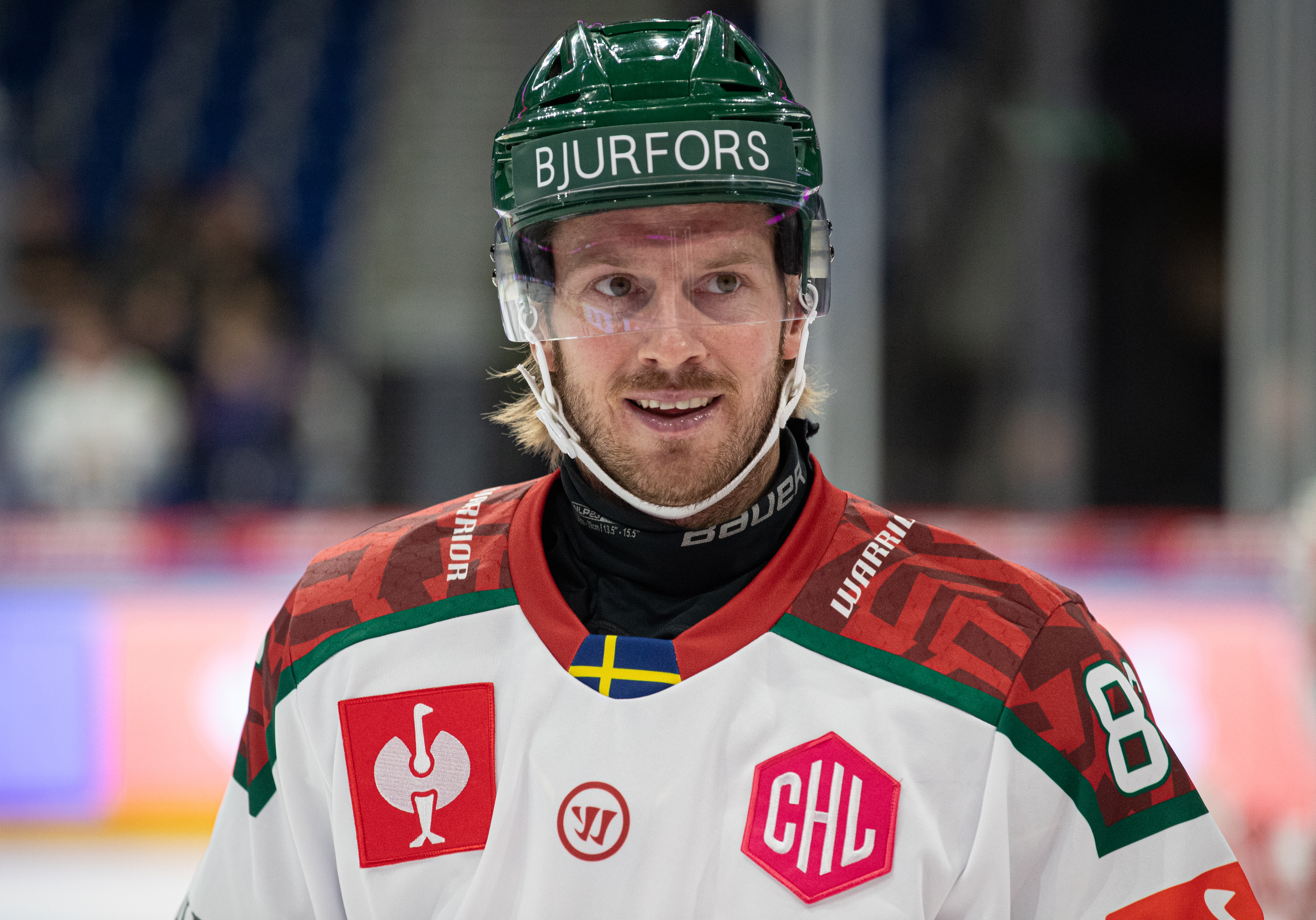
- Thorell in 2025
- Born: 3 March 1992 (age 33) Karlstad, Sweden
- Height: 178 cm (5 ft 10 in)
- Weight: 81 kg (179 lb; 12 st 11 lb)
- Position: Left wing
- Shoots: Left
- SHL team Former teams: Frölunda HC; Färjestad BK; TPS; HIFK; EV Zug; Sparta Praha
- Playing career: 2010–present

Medal record

Representing Sweden

Ice hockey

World Junior Championships
Gold medal – first place	2012 Canada	

World U18 Championships
Silver medal – second place	2010 Belarus	

Erik Thorell (born 3 March 1992) is a Swedish professional ice hockey player who currently plays for Frölunda HC in the Swedish Hockey League (SHL). He has previously played with HIFK in the Finnish Liiga.

== Playing career ==
On 24 April 2019, Thorell joined EV Zug of the National League on a two-year deal worth CHF 1.2 million.

== Career statistics ==
=== Regular season and playoffs ===
			Regular season					Playoffs
Season	Team	League	GP	G	A	Pts	PIM	GP	G	A	Pts	PIM
2009–10	Skåre BK	SWE.3	17	10	10	20	14	—	—	—	—	—
2009–10	Färjestads BK	SHL	4	0	0	0	0	—	—	—	—	—
2010–11	Skåre BK	SWE.3	17	11	11	22	56	—	—	—	—	—
2010–11	IF Sundsvall Hockey	HA	22	2	8	10	10	—	—	—	—	—
2010–11	Färjestads BK	SHL	3	0	0	0	0	6	0	0	0	0
2011–12	Färjestads BK	J20	2	0	1	1	2	—	—	—	—	—
2011–12	Färjestads BK	SHL	44	3	3	6	2	11	0	1	1	4
2012–13	Färjestads BK	SHL	54	1	3	4	10	10	0	1	1	0
2013–14	Rögle BK	HA	33	4	7	11	2	12	3	0	3	2
2014–15	Karlskrona HK	HA	42	10	20	30	12	4	1	1	2	2
2015–16	BIK Karlskoga	HA	52	15	35	50	22	5	3	5	8	0
2016–17	TPS	Liiga	56	24	20	44	10	6	1	2	3	0
2017–18	HIFK	Liiga	60	17	29	46	16	13	3	6	9	0
2018–19	HIFK	Liiga	47	24	25	49	8	13	2	4	6	2
2019–20	EV Zug	NL	30	8	11	19	14	—	—	—	—	—
2020–21	EV Zug	NL	42	8	16	24	14	—	—	—	—	—
2021–22	HC Sparta Praha	ELH	49	21	31	52	8	16	4	6	10	2
2022–23	HC Sparta Praha	ELH	42	8	15	23	12	4	0	0	0	0
2023–24	Frölunda HC	SHL	25	2	7	9	6	14	1	3	4	2
2024–25	Frölunda HC	SHL	43	13	11	24	10	11	1	2	3	0
SHL totals			173	19	24	43	28	52	2	7	9	6

=== International ===
Year	Team	Event	Result	GP	G	A	Pts	PIM
2010	Sweden	U18	2nd place, silver medalist(s)	6	3	0	3	4
2012	Sweden	WJC	1st place, gold medalist(s)	6	3	3	6	0
Junior totals				53	15	14	29	30
