= Reto Amstutz =

Swiss ice hockey player (born 1993)

- Born: February 24, 1993 (age 32) Switzerland
- Height: 5 ft 9 in (175 cm)
- Weight: 176 lb (80 kg; 12 st 8 lb)
- Position: Centre
- Shoots: Right
- NLA team: SC Bern
- NHL draft: Undrafted
- Playing career: 2011–present

Reto Amstutz (born February 24, 1993) is a Swiss professional ice hockey player. He is currently playing with the SC Bern of Switzerland's National League A.

Amstutz participated at the 2012 World Junior Ice Hockey Championships as a member of the Switzerland men's national junior ice hockey team.
