= Petter Granberg =

Swedish ice hockey player (born 1992)

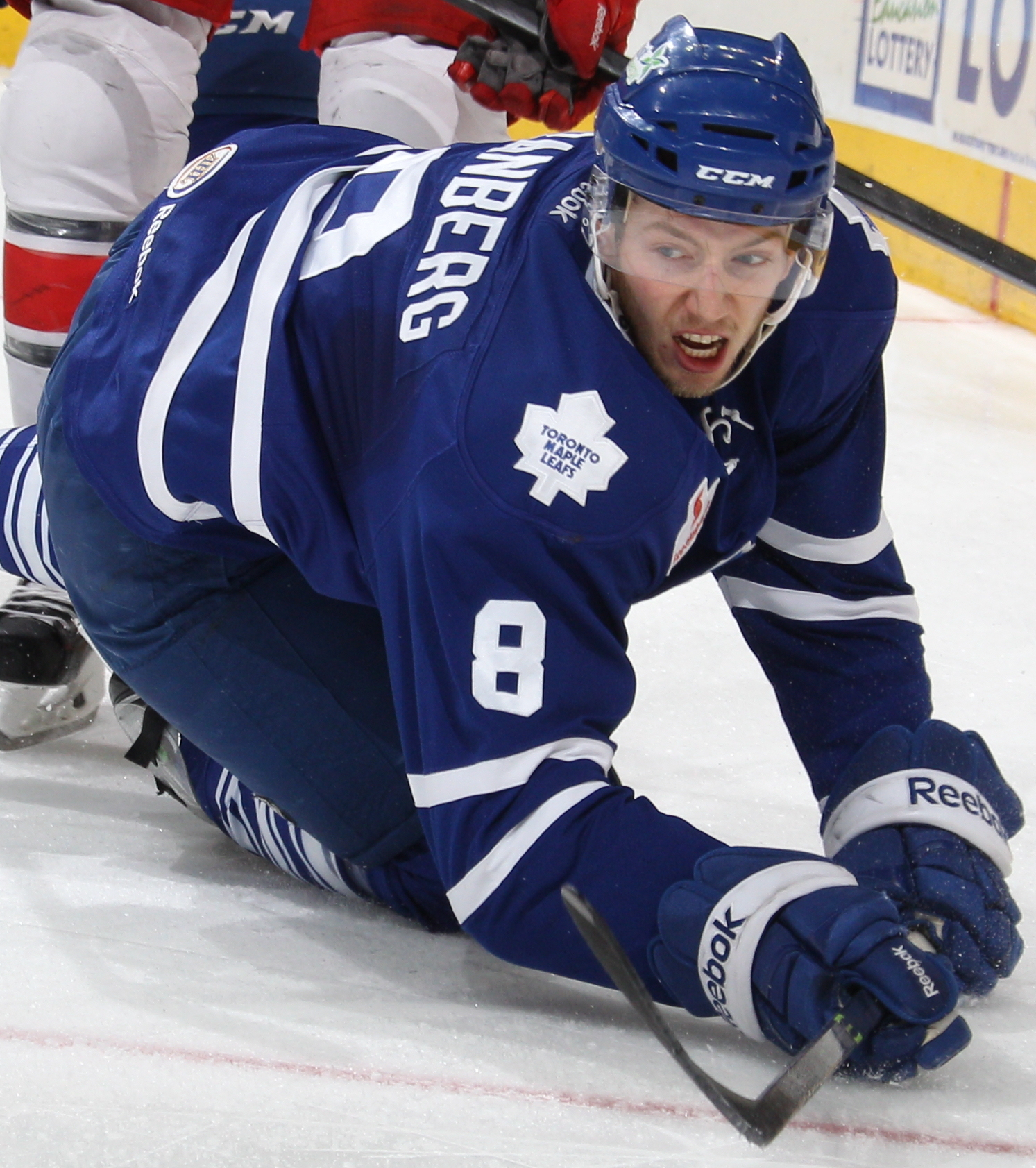
- Granberg with the Toronto Marlies in 2013
- Born: 27 August 1992 (age 33) Gällivare, Sweden
- Height: 6 ft 3 in (191 cm)
- Weight: 200 lb (91 kg; 14 st 4 lb)
- Position: Defence
- Shoots: Right
- SHL team Former teams: Växjö Lakers; Skellefteå AIK; Toronto Maple Leafs; Nashville Predators
- National team: Sweden
- NHL draft: 116th overall, 2010; Toronto Maple Leafs
- Playing career: 2010–present

Petter Jonas Granberg (born 27 August 1992) is a Swedish professional ice hockey player. He is currently playing with Växjö Lakers in the Swedish Hockey League (SHL). Granberg was drafted 116th overall by the Toronto Maple Leafs in the 2010 NHL entry draft.

== Playing career ==
On 13 April 2014, Granberg made his NHL debut skating for the Toronto Maple Leafs during a 1–0 loss to the Ottawa Senators.

Prior to the 2015–16 season, Granberg suffered an off-season injury, requiring surgery for a torn achilles. Nearing a return to playing after a four-month rehabilitation, Granberg was placed on waivers by the Maple Leafs. On 22 November 2015, Granberg was claimed off waivers by the Nashville Predators.

In the 2017–18 season, Granberg was assigned by the Predators to continue playing for the duration of the campaign with their AHL affiliate, the Milwaukee Admirals. Unable to make an NHL appearance in his third season within the Predators organization, Granberg left as an impending restricted free agent to sign a three-year contract with his former Swedish team, Skellefteå AIK, on 18 May 2018.

As a free agent following capturing his second Le Mat Trophy with Skellefteå, Granberg was signed to a two-year contract to join the Växjö Lakers on 14 May 2024.

== Career statistics ==
=== Regular season and playoffs ===
			Regular season					Playoffs
Season	Team	League	GP	G	A	Pts	PIM	GP	G	A	Pts	PIM
2008–09	Skellefteå AIK	J20	4	0	0	0	0	2	0	0	0	6
2009–10	Skellefteå J20	J20	40	2	7	9	39	4	1	0	1	4
2009–10	Skellefteå AIK	SEL	1	0	0	0	0	—	—	—	—	—
2010–11	Skellefteå J20	J20	34	2	6	8	16	5	0	1	1	0
2010–11	Skellefteå AIK	SEL	22	0	1	1	6	11	0	1	1	2
2011–12	Skellefteå J20	J20	5	2	4	6	6	—	—	—	—	—
2011–12	Skellefteå AIK	SEL	38	1	3	4	10	19	1	1	2	12
2011–12	IF Sundsvall	Allsv	3	0	0	0	6	—	—	—	—	—
2012–13	Skellefteå J20	J20	3	0	1	1	2	—	—	—	—	—
2012–13	Skellefteå AIK	SEL	13	0	0	0	4	13	0	2	2	10
2013–14	Toronto Marlies	AHL	73	2	5	7	28	14	0	2	2	8
2013–14	Toronto Maple Leafs	NHL	1	0	0	0	0	—	—	—	—	—
2014–15	Toronto Marlies	AHL	53	1	14	15	30	5	0	1	1	4
2014–15	Toronto Maple Leafs	NHL	7	0	0	0	6	—	—	—	—	—
2015–16	Milwaukee Admirals	AHL	6	0	1	1	4	—	—	—	—	—
2015–16	Nashville Predators	NHL	27	0	2	2	13	—	—	—	—	—
2016–17	Milwaukee Admirals	AHL	50	1	5	6	34	3	1	0	1	0
2016–17	Nashville Predators	NHL	10	0	0	0	10	—	—	—	—	—
2017–18	Milwaukee Admirals	AHL	76	3	11	14	47	—	—	—	—	—
2018–19	Skellefteå AIK	SHL	46	1	6	7	30	6	0	0	0	2
2019–20	Skellefteå AIK	SHL	52	2	7	9	38	—	—	—	—	—
2020–21	Skellefteå AIK	SHL	46	2	4	6	20	12	0	0	0	8
2021–22	Skellefteå AIK	SHL	50	1	6	7	51	6	0	0	0	2
2022–23	Skellefteå AIK	SHL	52	2	5	7	71	17	0	1	1	10
2023–24	Skellefteå AIK	SHL	51	3	6	9	70	16	0	0	0	14
2024–25	Växjö Lakers	SHL	52	3	6	9	18	8	0	1	1	12
SHL totals			424	15	44	59	318	108	1	6	7	72
NHL totals			45	0	2	2	29	—	—	—	—	—

Medal record

Representing Sweden

Ice hockey

World Championships
Gold medal – first place	2013 Sweden/Finland	

World Junior Championships
Gold medal – first place	2012 Canada	

IIHF World U18 Championship
Silver medal – second place	2010 Belarus	

=== International ===
Year	Team	Event	Result	GP	G	A	Pts	PIM
2010	Sweden	U18	2nd place, silver medalist(s)	6	0	1	1	2
2012	Sweden	WJC	1st place, gold medalist(s)	5	0	1	1	4
2013	Sweden	WC	1st place, gold medalist(s)	10	0	1	1	2
2015	Sweden	WC	5th	5	0	1	1	4
Junior totals				11	0	2	2	6
Senior totals				15	0	2	2	6

== Awards and honours ==
Award	Year
SHL
Le Mat Trophy (Skellefteå AIK)	2013, 2024
