= Zakhar Arzamastsev =

Russian ice hockey player (born 1992)

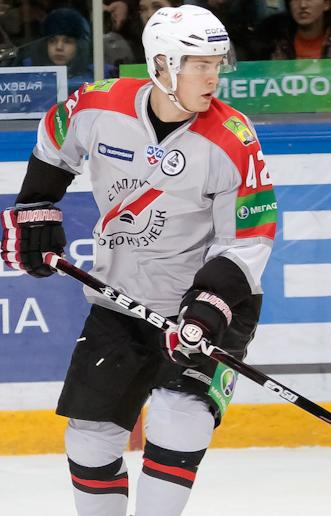
- Arzamastsev with Metallurg Novokuznetsk in 2012
- Born: November 6, 1992 (age 32); Novokuznetsk, Russia
- Height: 6 ft 2 in (188 cm)
- Weight: 220 lb (100 kg; 15 st 10 lb)
- Position: Defence
- Shoots: Left
- VHL team Former teams: Metallurg Novokuznetsk; Lokomotiv Yaroslavl; CSKA Moscow; Severstal Cherepovets; Salavat Yulaev Ufa; Avtomobilist Yekaterinburg; Rytíři Kladno; Spartak Moscow
- Playing career: 2009–present

Medal record

Representing Russia

Ice hockey

World Junior Championships
Silver medal – second place	2012 Canada	

World Junior A Challenge
Bronze medal – third place	2009 Summerside	

Zakhar Arzamastsev (born November 6, 1992) is a Russian professional ice hockey Defenseman who currently plays with Metallurg Novokuznetsk of the Supreme Hockey League (VHL).

Arzamastsev made his KHL debut playing with Metallurg Novokuznetsk during the 2009–10 KHL season.

Following a brief stint with Rytíři Kladno in the Czech Extraliga (ELH), Arzamastsev returned to the KHL after signing a one-year contract with HC Spartak Moscow for the 2022–23 season on 16 July 2022.
