= Juraj Šimboch =

Slovak ice hockey player

- Born: 30 January 1992 (age 33); Czechoslovakia
- Height: 6 ft 0 in (183 cm)
- Weight: 179 lb (81 kg; 12 st 11 lb)
- Position: Goaltender
- Catches: Left
- team Former teams: Free agent HK Orange 20; HK Nitra; HC Oceláři Třinec; HC Berounští Medvědi; LHK Jestřábi Prostějov; HC ZUBR Přerov; HC Frýdek-Místek; GKS Katowice
- NHL draft: Undrafted
- Playing career: 2011–present

Juraj Šimboch (born 30 January 1992) is a Slovak ice hockey goaltender. He is currently a free agent.

He participated at the 2012 World Junior Ice Hockey Championships as a member of the Slovakia men's national junior ice hockey team.
