= Yaroslav Kosov =

Russian ice hockey player

- Born: July 5, 1993 (age 32) Magnitogorsk, Russia
- Height: 6 ft 3 in (191 cm)
- Weight: 209 lb (95 kg; 14 st 13 lb)
- Position: Right wing
- Shoots: Left
- KHL team Former teams: Free Agent; Metallurg Magnitogorsk; Ak Bars Kazan; Spartak Moscow; Neftekhimik Nizhnekamsk; Traktor Chelyabinsk; Avangard Omsk
- NHL draft: 124th overall, 2011; Florida Panthers
- Playing career: 2011–present

Yaroslav Alekseyevich Kosov (Russian: Ярослав Алексеевич Косов; born July 5, 1993) is a Russian professional ice hockey player. He is currently an unrestricted free agent who most recently played with Avangard Omsk in the Kontinental Hockey League (KHL). Kosov was selected by the Florida Panthers in the 5th round (124th overall) of the 2011 NHL entry draft.

== Playing career ==
Kosov was also drafted by Metallurg Magnitogorsk who selected him in the 3rd round (70th overall) of the 2010 KHL Junior Draft.

At the beginning of the 2018–19 season, before making his season debut, Kosov was traded by reigning champions Ak Bars, to HC Spartak Moscow in exchange for Dmitry Yudin on September 3, 2018. Kosov made 24 appearances with Spartak, registering 3 goals and 5 points before he was traded to his fourth KHL club, HC Neftekhimik Nizhnekamsk.

As a free agent leading into the 2021–22 season, Kosov left Traktor Chelyabinsk after two seasons and signed a one-year deal with reigning champions, Avangard Omsk, on 21 May 2021.

== Career statistics ==
=== Regular season and playoffs ===
			Regular season					Playoffs
Season	Team	League	GP	G	A	Pts	PIM	GP	G	A	Pts	PIM
2010–11	Stalnye Lisy	MHL	42	11	10	21	22	17	6	1	7	0
2011–12	Stalnye Lisy	MHL	12	6	4	10	6	6	0	0	0	0
2011–12	Metallurg Magnitogorsk	KHL	27	4	5	9	6	7	0	0	0	0
2012–13	Metallurg Magnitogorsk	KHL	40	4	3	7	10	5	0	0	0	0
2012–13	Stalnye Lisy	MHL	—	—	—	—	—	3	0	1	1	0
2013–14	Metallurg Magnitogorsk	KHL	32	2	2	4	0	21	2	1	3	0
2013–14	Yuzhny Ural Orsk	VHL	2	1	1	2	2	—	—	—	—	—
2013–14	Stalnye Lisy	MHL	2	1	2	3	0	—	—	—	—	—
2014–15	Metallurg Magnitogorsk	KHL	52	4	5	9	14	5	0	0	0	4
2015–16	Metallurg Magnitogorsk	KHL	52	4	1	5	28	23	4	3	7	6
2016–17	Metallurg Magnitogorsk	KHL	41	3	2	5	27	18	4	2	6	8
2017–18	Metallurg Magnitogorsk	KHL	19	2	5	7	6	—	—	—	—	—
2017–18	Ak Bars Kazan	KHL	19	3	4	7	2	11	3	2	5	2
2018–19	Spartak Moscow	KHL	24	3	2	5	6	—	—	—	—	—
2018–19	CSK VVS Samara	VHL	1	0	0	0	0	—	—	—	—	—
2018–19	Neftekhimik Nizhnekamsk	KHL	4	0	1	1	0	—	—	—	—	—
2019–20	Traktor Chelyabinsk	KHL	59	12	10	22	26	—	—	—	—	—
2020–21	Traktor Chelyabinsk	KHL	48	11	3	14	10	1	0	0	0	0
2021–22	Avangard Omsk	KHL	24	3	1	4	25	1	0	0	0	0
KHL totals			442	55	44	99	160	92	13	8	21	20

Medal record

Representing Russia

Ice hockey

World Junior Championships
Bronze medal – third place	2013 Ufa	
Silver medal – second place	2012 Canada	

=== International ===
Year	Team	Event	Result	GP	G	A	Pts	PIM
2012	Russia	WJC	2nd place, silver medalist(s)	7	2	2	4	0
2013	Russia	WJC	3rd place, bronze medalist(s)	7	3	1	4	2
Junior totals				14	5	3	8	2

== Awards and honors ==
Award	Year
KHL
Gagarin Cup (Metallurg Magnitogorsk)	2014, 2016
Gagarin Cup (Ak Bars Kazan)	2018
