= Vermeil (disambiguation) =

Vermeil is a combination of precious metals used as a component in jewelry.

Vermeil may also refer to:

- Vermeil Room, in the White House
- Dick Vermeil (born 1936), American football coach
- Edmond Vermeil (1878–1964), French academic
- An old name for garnet

== See also ==
- Vermeille (disambiguation)
