= Richard Mráz =

Slovak ice hockey player

- Born: February 19, 1993 (age 32); Nové Zámky, Slovakia
- Height: 6 ft 2 in (188 cm)
- Weight: 209 lb (95 kg; 14 st 13 lb)
- Position: Winger
- Shoots: Right
- [REMS] team Former teams: HC Leukergrund; KHL; HC Lev Poprad; HC Slovan Bratislava; HK Nitra
- NHL draft: Undrafted
- Playing career: 2011–present

Richard Mráz (born February 19, 1993) is a Slovak ice hockey player. He is currently playing with HC Leukergrund of the Regionale Eishockeymeisterschaft "REMS".

Mráz previously played in the Kontinental Hockey League (KHL), making his debut playing with HC Lev Poprad during the 2011–12 KHL season. During the 2013-14 KHL season, he played for HC Slovan Bratislava, before being loaned to HK Nitra to finish the season.
