= Miloš Bubela =

Slovak ice hockey player (born 1992)

- Born: 25 August 1992 (age 33) Banská Bystrica, Czechoslovakia
- Height: 188 cm (6 ft 2 in)
- Weight: 86 kg (190 lb; 13 st 8 lb)
- Position: Forward
- Shoots: Right
- Slovak team Former teams: HK Dukla Trenčín; HK Orange 20; Utica Comets; HC '05 Banská Bystrica; HC Dynamo Pardubice; Bratislava Capitals; HK Poprad; HK Nitra
- National team: Slovakia
- NHL draft: Undrafted
- Playing career: 2011–present

Miloš Bubela (born 25 August 1992) is a Slovak ice hockey player who currently plays for HK Dukla Trenčín of the Slovak Extraliga.

== Career ==
Bubela competed in the 2018 Winter Olympics for the Slovakia men's national ice hockey team in Pyeongchang, South Korea.

== Career statistics ==
=== Regular season and playoffs ===
			Regular season					Playoffs
Season	Team	League	GP	G	A	Pts	PIM	GP	G	A	Pts	PIM
2007–08	HK 95 Považská Bystrica	SVK U18	33	6	3	9	8	—	—	—	—	—
2008–09	HK 95 Považská Bystrica	SVK.2 U18	39	27	22	49	60	—	—	—	—	—
2008–09	HK 95 Považská Bystrica	SVK.2 U20	21	9	10	19	4	—	—	—	—	—
2009–10	HK Trnava	SVK U18	22	15	11	26	18	—	—	—	—	—
2009–10	HK Trnava	SVK U20	29	5	7	12	10	—	—	—	—	—
2010–11	HK 36 Skalica	SVK U20	7	1	9	10	2	—	—	—	—	—
2010–11	Dukla Trenčín	SVK U20	3	1	0	1	0	15	3	4	7	8
2010–11	HK 95 Považská Bystrica	SVK.2	37	8	8	16	20	—	—	—	—	—
2011–12	HK Orange 20	Slovak	9	2	2	4	0	—	—	—	—	—
2011–12	HK Orange 20	SVK.2	12	1	3	4	29	—	—	—	—	—
2011–12	Dubuque Fighting Saints	USHL	29	5	13	18	6	5	0	2	2	12
2012–13	RPI Engineers	ECAC	37	8	11	19	43	—	—	—	—	—
2013–14	RPI Engineers	ECAC	32	4	6	10	32	—	—	—	—	—
2014–15	RPI Engineers	ECAC	35	8	7	15	30	—	—	—	—	—
2015–16	RPI Engineers	ECAC	35	13	6	19	50	—	—	—	—	—
2015–16	Utica Comets	AHL	8	0	1	1	2	—	—	—	—	—
2016–17	Wheeling Nailers	ECHL	16	1	3	4	6	—	—	—	—	—
2016–17	Orlando Solar Bears	ECHL	31	8	11	19	18	7	2	0	2	15
2017–18	HC ’05 iClinic Banská Bystrica	Slovak	52	18	21	39	18	12	4	5	9	16
2018–19	HC Dynamo Pardubice	ELH	40	5	10	15	26	—	—	—	—	—
2019–20	HC ’05 iClinic Banská Bystrica	Slovak	38	7	15	22	22	—	—	—	—	—
2020–21	Bratislava Capitals	ICEHL	46	13	16	29	52	5	0	1	1	2
2021–22	HC '05 Banská Bystrica	Slovak	49	10	11	21	40	8	0	3	3	39
2022–23	HK Poprad	Slovak	49	16	13	29	38	3	0	0	0	2
2023–24	HK Nitra	Slovak	48	9	7	16	34	21	7	9	16	26
2024–25	HK Nitra	Slovak	49	12	19	31	110	17	4	8	12	45
2025–26	HK Nitra	Slovak	38	10	12	22	26	—	—	—	—	—
2025–26	HK Dukla Trenčín	Slovak	8	2	0	2	12	—	—	—	—	—
Slovak totals			340	86	100	186	300	61	15	25	40	128
ELH totals			40	5	10	15	26	—	—	—	—	—

=== International ===
Year	Team	Event	Result	GP	G	A	Pts	PIM
2012	Slovakia	WJC	6th	6	2	3	5	4
2018	Slovakia	OG	11th	4	1	0	1	6
Junior totals				6	2	3	5	4
Senior totals				4	1	0	1	6
