= Daniel Krejčí =

Czech ice hockey player

- Born: April 27, 1992 (age 33); Prague, Czechoslovakia
- Height: 6 ft 3 in (191 cm)
- Weight: 203 lb (92 kg; 14 st 7 lb)
- Position: Defence
- Shoots: Left
- Czech-3 team Former teams: HC Baník Příbram; HC Oceláři Třinec, HC Slavia Praha, HC Havlíčkův Brod, HC Most, HC Berounští Medvědi, Rytíři Kladno, HC Stadion Litoměřice, HKM Zvolen, HC Benátky nad Jizerou, HC Energie Karlovy Vary, LHK Jestřábi Prostějov, HK Dukla Trenčín, HC Slovan Ústí nad Labem, HC Poruba 2011, Cracovia Krakow
- NHL draft: Undrafted
- Playing career: 2010–present

Daniel Krejčí (born April 27, 1992) is a Czech professional ice hockey defenceman. He is currently playing with HC Baník Příbram in the third-tier 2nd Czech Republic Hockey League. He played for HC Slavia Praha in the Czech Extraliga, firstly in the 2011–12 season and later in the 2014–15 season. He also played for Slavia in the second Czech level of hockey between 2020 and 2022.

Krejci was selected by the Traktor Chelyabinsk in the 5th round (117th overall) of the 2010 KHL Junior Draft. Krejčí made his Czech Extraliga debut playing with HC Slavia Praha during the 2011–12 Czech Extraliga season.
