= Jiří Říha =

Czech ice hockey player

- Born: September 18, 1992 (age 32); Rychnov nad Kněžnou, Czechoslovakia
- Height: 6 ft 2 in (188 cm)
- Weight: 187 lb (85 kg; 13 st 5 lb)
- Position: Forward / Defenceman
- Shoots: Right
- Czech Extraliga team: Hc verva Litvínov
- NHL draft: Undrafted
- Playing career: 2011–present

Jiří Říha (born September 18, 1992) is a Czech professional ice hockey player who currently plays with HC VERVA Litvínov in the Czech Extraliga.
