= Juho Kuronen =

Finnish ice hockey defenceman (born 1982)

- Born: February 18, 1982 (age 43) Kuopio, Finland
- Height: 5 ft 11 in (180 cm)
- Weight: 185 lb (84 kg; 13 st 3 lb)
- Position: Defence
- Shot: Left
- Played for: KalPa
- Playing career: 2000–2012

Juho Kuronen (born February 18, 1982) is a Finnish former professional ice hockey defenceman.

== Career ==
Kuronen began his career with KalPa's junior teams before joining Hermes in Finland's second-tier league Mestis in 2000. After two seasons, he moved to KalPa who were promoted to SM-liiga in 2005. In his one season in SM-liiga, Kuronen played 42 game during the 2005–06 season, scoring four goals and three assists.

He moved back down to Mestis the following year with Jokipojat for two seasons before moving to Sweden's third-tier Hockeyettan with Olofströms IK for one season. He then returned to Finland with brief spells with IPK and KalPa Team in the 2. Divisioona before retiring in 2012.

Kuronen was a member of the gold medal-winning Finland team in the 2000 IIHF World U18 Championships.

== Career statistics ==
			Regular season					Playoffs
Season	Team	League	GP	G	A	Pts	PIM	GP	G	A	Pts	PIM
1996–97	KalPa U18	U18 SM-sarja	26	4	10	14	20	—	—	—	—	—
1997–98	KalPa U16	U16 SM-sarja Q	8	4	4	8	2	—	—	—	—	—
1997–98	KalPa U16	U16 SM-sarja	8	4	2	6	33	—	—	—	—	—
1997–98	KalPa U18	U18 SM-sarja	13	1	0	1	8	—	—	—	—	—
1998–99	KalPa U20	U20 SM-liiga	—	—	—	—	—	—	—	—	—	—
1999–00	KalPa U20	U20 SM-liiga	30	2	1	3	14	1	0	0	0	0
2000–01	Kokkolan Hermes	Mestis	39	0	5	5	26	6	0	0	0	0
2001–02	Kokkolan Hermes	Mestis	44	2	5	7	10	3	0	0	0	2
2002–03	KalPa	Mestis	36	4	4	8	10	4	0	1	1	0
2003–04	KalPa	Mestis	40	5	7	12	14	11	0	2	2	2
2004–05	KalPa	Mestis	36	0	4	4	8	9	0	0	0	2
2005–06	KalPa	SM-liiga	42	4	3	7	24	—	—	—	—	—
2006–07	Jokipojat	Mestis	42	8	12	20	62	3	0	0	0	4
2007–08	Jokipojat	Mestis	39	5	16	21	20	3	1	0	1	2
2008–09	Olofströms IK	Division 1	37	5	7	12	16	—	—	—	—	—
2009–10	Iisalmen Peli-Karhut	2. Divisioona	5	2	6	8	4	3	1	1	2	0
2010–11	KalPa Team	2. Divisioona	3	0	1	1	2	—	—	—	—	—
SM-liiga totals			42	4	3	7	24	—	—	—	—	—
Mestis totals			276	24	53	77	150	39	1	3	4	12
