= Cédric Schneuwly =

Swiss ice hockey player

- Born: May 19, 1992 (age 32); Aarau, Switzerland
- Height: 6 ft 1 in (185 cm)
- Weight: 187 lb (85 kg; 13 st 5 lb)
- Position: Left wing
- Shot: Left
- Played for: EHC Aarau; EV Zug; SC Herisau; SCL Tigers; EHC Olten; EHC Basel; SC Altstadt Olten
- Playing career: 2010–2023

Cédric Schneuwly (born May 19, 1992) is a Swiss former professional ice hockey forward. He is currently playing for EHC Olten in the National League B (NLB). He formerly played with EV Zug in the Swiss top tier National League A.

Schneuwly participated at the 2012 World Junior Ice Hockey Championships as a member of the Switzerland men's national junior ice hockey team.

== Career statistics ==
			Regular season					Playoffs
Season	Team	League	GP	G	A	Pts	PIM	GP	G	A	Pts	PIM
2006–07	Aarau U20	Top Junioren	8	2	2	4	0	—	—	—	—	—
2007–08	EV Zug U17	Elite Novizen	19	2	6	8	8	6	1	1	2	6
2007–08	EHC Aarau	SwissDiv1	4	0	0	0	0	2	0	0	0	0
2008–09	EV Zug U17	Elite Novizen	28	17	25	42	38	—	—	—	—	—
2008–09	Aarau U20	Top Junioren	1	0	0	0	0	—	—	—	—	—
2008–09	EHC Aarau	SwissDiv1	11	1	2	3	4	3	0	0	0	0
2009–10	EV Zug U20	Elite Jr. A	38	12	18	30	20	9	1	3	4	6
2009–10	EHC Aarau	SwissDiv1	5	2	0	2	2	—	—	—	—	—
2010–11	EV Zug U20	Elite Jr. A	27	16	19	35	42	5	0	1	1	2
2010–11	EV Zug	NLA	—	—	—	—	—	2	0	0	0	0
2010–11	SC Herisau	SwissDiv1	4	1	0	1	14	—	—	—	—	—
2011–12	EV Zug U20	Elite Jr. A	32	14	34	48	44	11	6	13	19	4
2011–12	EV Zug	NLA	6	0	0	0	0	4	0	0	0	0
2012–13	EV Zug	NLA	48	1	6	7	6	11	0	0	0	2
2013–14	EV Zug	NLA	20	0	0	0	4	—	—	—	—	—
2013–14	SCL Tigers	NLB	19	2	5	7	6	—	—	—	—	—
2013–14	EHC Olten	NLB	2	0	2	2	0	6	1	5	6	2
2014–15	EHC Olten	NLB	36	6	6	12	22	15	4	3	7	2
2015–16	EHC Olten	NLB	45	12	16	28	26	13	2	5	7	2
2016–17	EHC Olten	NLB	48	16	18	34	39	5	0	0	0	2
2017–18	EHC Olten	SL	46	6	15	21	22	11	1	0	1	6
2018–19	EHC Olten	SL	37	4	5	9	18	10	0	1	1	2
2018–19	EHC Basel	MSL	1	0	0	0	0	—	—	—	—	—
2019–20	SC Altstadt Olten	SwissDiv2	8	7	8	15	31	4	1	2	3	10
2020–21	SC Altstadt Olten	SwissDiv2	2	2	1	3	0	—	—	—	—	—
2021–22	SC Altstadt Olten	SwissDiv2	10	10	8	18	0	6	7	5	12	4
2022–23	SC Altstadt Olten	SwissDiv2	7	4	5	9	2	6	6	6	12	12
NLA totals			74	1	6	7	10	17	0	0	0	2
SL/NLB totals			233	46	67	113	133	60	8	14	22	16
