= Mike Vermeille =

Swiss ice hockey player

- Born: April 5, 1992 (age 32); Porrentruy, Switzerland
- Height: 6 ft 3 in (191 cm)
- Weight: 212 lb (96 kg; 15 st 2 lb)
- Position: Defence
- Catches: Left
- MySports League team Former teams: HC Sion; HC Red Ice (NLB); HC Sierre-Anniviers (NLB); Genève-Servette HC (NLA)
- National team: Switzerland
- NHL draft: Undrafted
- Playing career: 2010–present

Mike Vermeille (born April 5, 1992) is a Swiss ice hockey defenceman. He is currently playing with HC Sion-Nendaz 4 Vallées of the Swiss MySports League. Vermeille made his European Elite debut during the 2010–11 season playing in the National League A with the Genève-Servette HC.

Vermeille participated at the 2012 World Junior Ice Hockey Championships as a member of the Switzerland men's national junior ice hockey team.
