= Mikael Kuronen =

Finnish ice hockey player (born 1992)

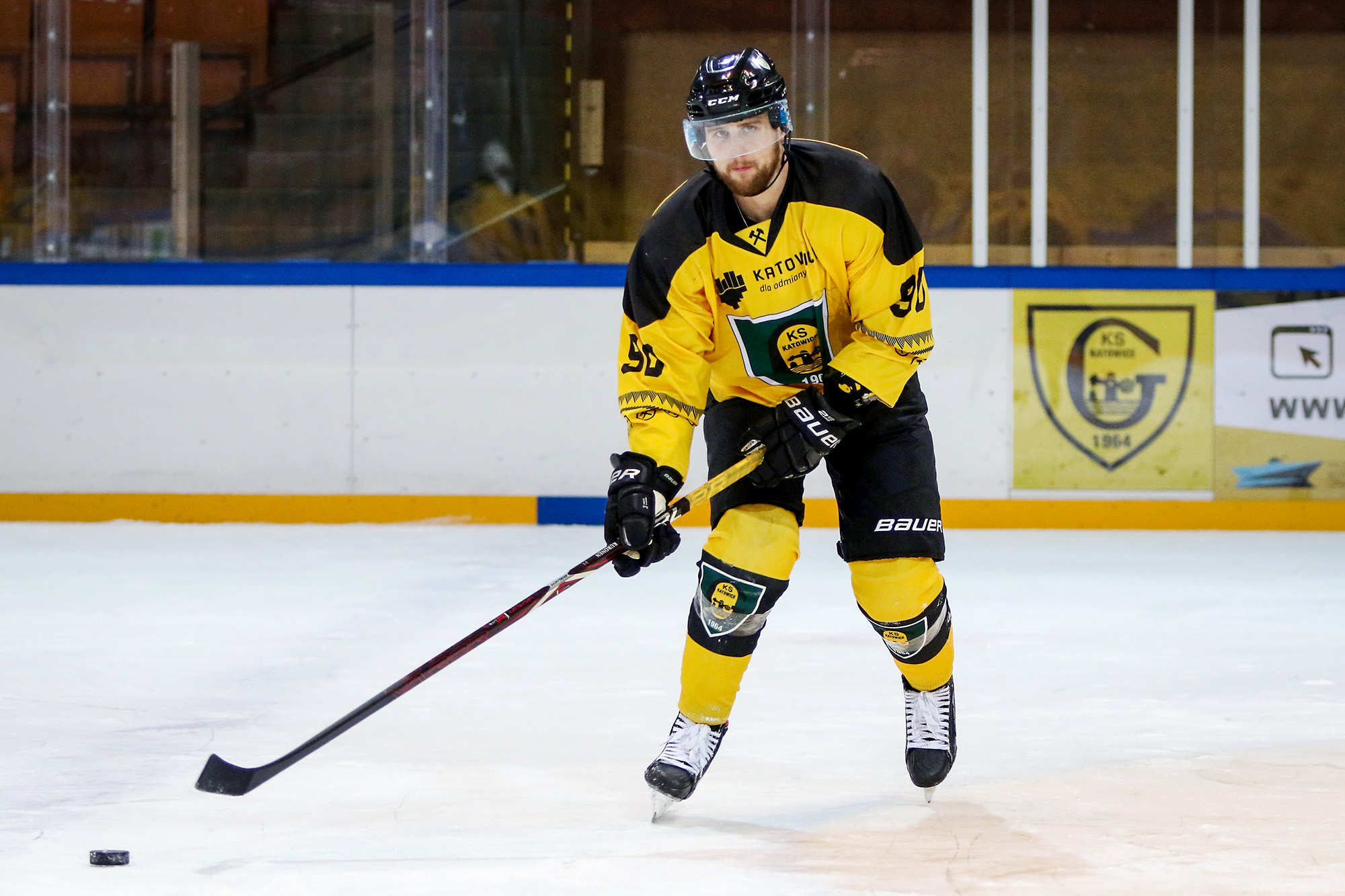
- Mikael Kuronen
- Born: March 14, 1992 (age 33); Tampere, Finland
- Height: 6 ft 0 in (183 cm)
- Weight: 172 lb (78 kg; 12 st 4 lb)
- Position: Forward
- Shoots: Left
- SM-liiga team Former teams: SaiPa; Ilves
- NHL draft: Undrafted
- Playing career: 2011–present

Mikael Kuronen (born March 14, 1992) is a Finnish professional ice hockey player currently playing for SaiPa in the SM-liiga.

Kuronen made his SM-liiga debut playing with Ilves during the 2011–12 SM-liiga season.

== Personal life ==
His father Hannu played professional hockey in the Liiga for eight seasons and his brother Markus also played hockey.
