= Mikhail Naumenkov =

Russian ice hockey player (born 1993)

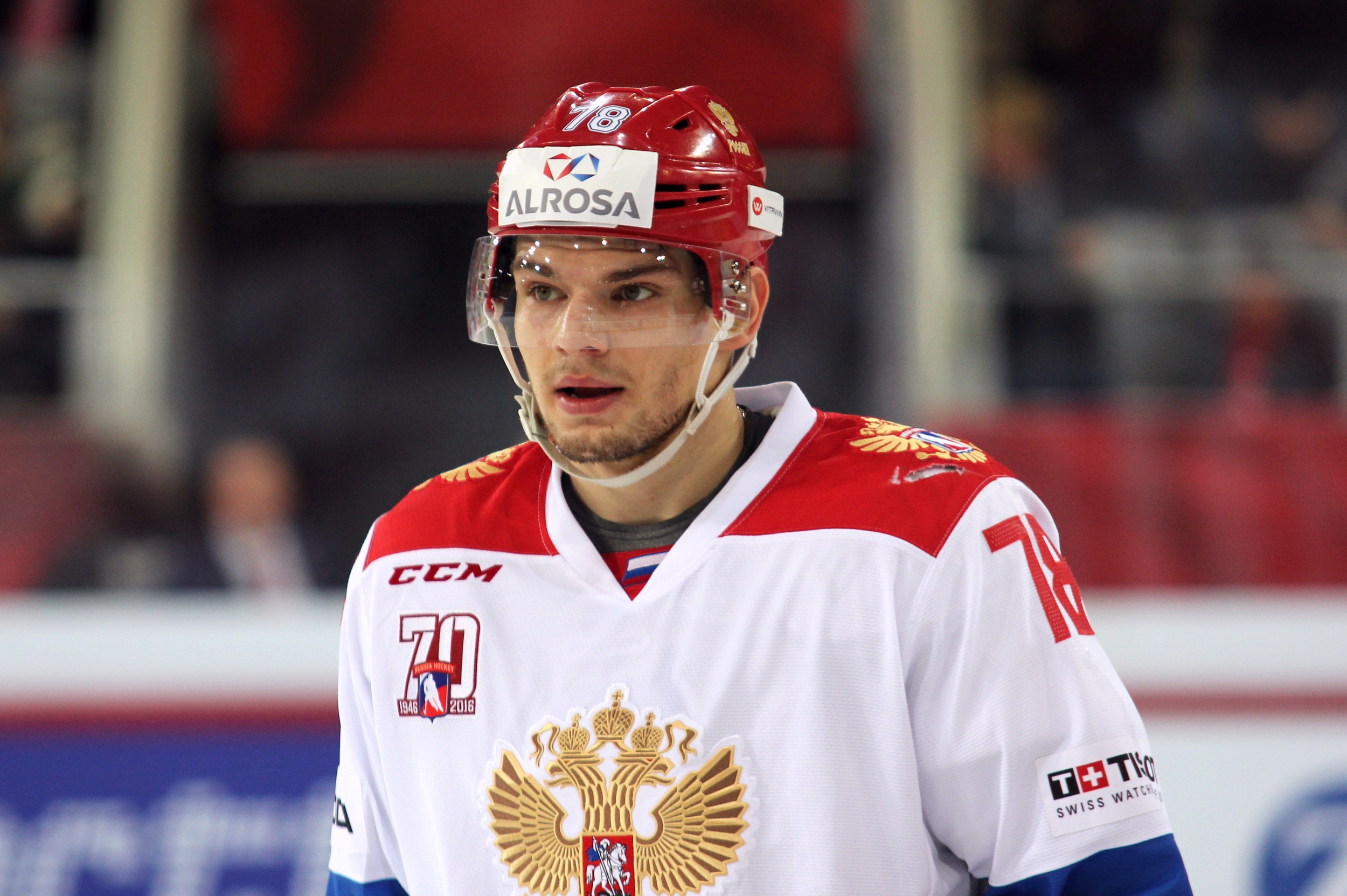
- Born: 19 February 1993 (age 33) Moscow, Russia
- Height: 6 ft 0 in (183 cm)
- Weight: 192 lb (87 kg; 13 st 10 lb)
- Position: Defence
- Shoots: Left
- KHL team Former teams: Shanghai Dragons; CSKA Moscow; Admiral Vladivostok; Salavat Yulaev Ufa; Torpedo Nizhny Novgorod
- Playing career: 2012–present

Mikhail Naumenkov (born 19 February 1993) is a Russian professional ice hockey defenceman for the Shanghai Dragons in the Kontinental Hockey League (KHL).

In his eighth year within the HC CSKA Moscow organization, and during the 2020–21 season, Naumenkov registered 6 points through 25 regular season games before he was traded to Salavat Yulaev Ufa in exchange for Nikita Soshnikov on 28 November 2020.

After five seasons with Salavat Yulaev, Naumenkov left at the conclusion of his contract and the 2024–25 season, to sign a one-year deal with Torpedo Nizhny Novgorod on 14 July 2025.

After his contract at Torpedo expired he signed a one-year deal with the Shanghai Dragons for the 2026–27 season on 23 June 2026.

== Awards and honors ==
Award	Year
MHL
Champion (Krasnaya Armiya Moscow)	2011
KHL
Gagarin Cup (CSKA Moscow)	2019
