= Salvia paohsingensis =

Scientific classification
- Kingdom: Plantae
- Clade: Tracheophytes
- Clade: Angiosperms
- Clade: Eudicots
- Clade: Asterids
- Order: Lamiales
- Family: Lamiaceae
- Genus: Salvia
- Species: S. paohsingensis

Binomial name
- Salvia paohsingensis C.Y.Wu

Species of flowering plant

Salvia paohsingensis (the Baoxing sage) is a perennial plant that is native to Sichuan province in China, growing in forests at 2,800 m (9,200 ft) elevation. It is related to Salvia maximowicziana. S. paohsingensis grows on slender, ascending to suberect stems, from 20 to 40 cm (7.9 to 15.7 in) tall.

The triangular-ovate leaves are 2.5 to 5 cm (0.98 to 1.97 in) long and 1 to 3 cm (0.39 to 1.18 in) wide. The inflorescence is of racemes or panicles up to 15 cm (5.9 in) long, with a 2 cm (0.79 in) purple corolla that has white spots on the upper lip.
