= Simon Karlsson =

Swedish ice hockey player

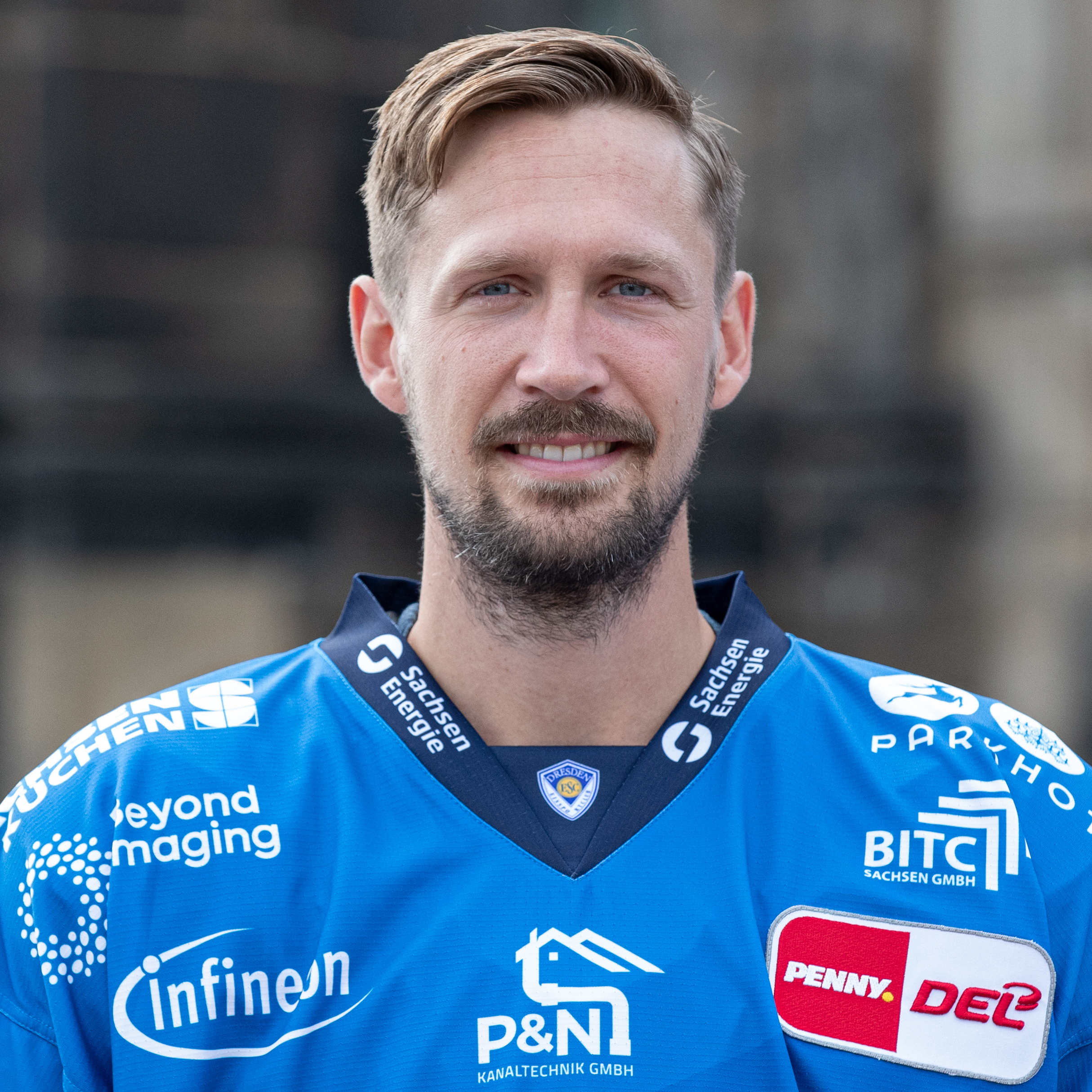
- Karlsson in 2025
- Born: July 23, 1993 (age 33) Malmö, Sweden
- Height: 6 ft 3 in (191 cm)
- Weight: 194 lb (88 kg; 13 st 12 lb)
- Position: Defense
- Shoots: Right
- DEL2 team Former teams: EHC Bayreuth; HV71
- NHL draft: 142nd overall, 2011; Nashville Predators
- Playing career: 2010–present

Simon Karlsson (born July 23, 1993) is a Swedish professional ice hockey player. He is currently playing with EHC Bayreuth of the DEL2. Karlsson was selected by the Nashville Predators in the 5th round (142nd overall) of the 2011 NHL entry draft.

Karlsson made his Swedish Hockey League debut playing with Malmö Redhawks during the 2010-11 Elitserien season.
