= 2011 NHL entry draft =

2011 North American ice hockey draft

General information
- Date: June 24–25, 2011
- Location: Xcel Energy Center; Saint Paul, Minnesota, U.S.

Overview
- 211 total selections in 7 rounds
- First selection: (Canada) Ryan Nugent-Hopkins (Edmonton Oilers)

The 2011 NHL entry draft was the 49th draft for the National Hockey League. It was held on June 24–25, 2011, at the Xcel Energy Center in Saint Paul, Minnesota. It was the first time the draft was held in the state of Minnesota since the Minnesota North Stars hosted the 1989 NHL entry draft. The top three selections were Ryan Nugent-Hopkins by the Edmonton Oilers, Gabriel Landeskog by the Colorado Avalanche, and Jonathan Huberdeau by the Florida Panthers.

The draft was also noteworthy as the venue at which the recently relocated Atlanta Thrashers franchise announced that they would be known as the Winnipeg Jets, making the announcement as they drafted Mark Scheifele with their first pick.

As of 2026, there are 41 active NHL players from this draft.

== Eligibility ==
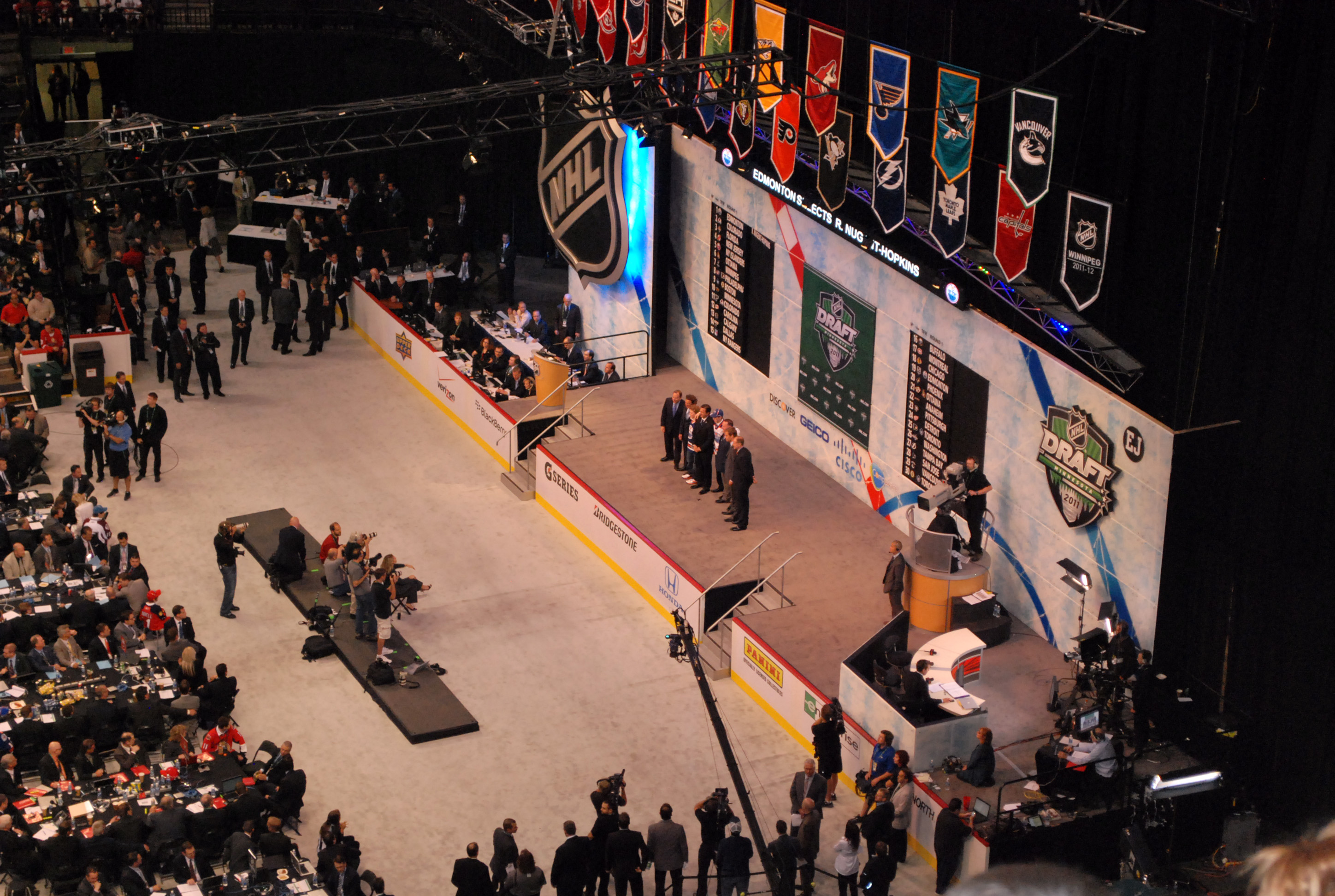
The Edmonton Oilers select Ryan Nugent-Hopkins as top pick in Round One of the 2011 NHL entry draft

Ice hockey players born between January 1, 1991, and September 15, 1993, were eligible for selection in the 2011 NHL entry draft. Additionally, un-drafted, non-North American players over the age of 20 were eligible for the draft; and those players who were drafted in the 2009 NHL entry draft, but not signed by an NHL team and who were born after June 24, 1991, were also eligible to re-enter the draft.

== Draft lottery ==
The draft lottery was held on April 12, 2011, and was won by the New Jersey Devils, who moved up four spots to the fourth-overall pick. The Edmonton Oilers retained the first-overall pick. This was the first time since the 2007 draft lottery that a team other than the team with the worst regular season record won the draft lottery. New Jersey were also tied with the 1999 Chicago Blackhawks for the lowest ranked team to win the lottery as the eighth seed.

== Top prospects ==
Source: NHL Central Scouting Bureau final ranking.

Ranking	North American skaters	European skaters
1	(Canada) Ryan Nugent-Hopkins (C)	(Sweden) Adam Larsson (D)
2	(Sweden) Gabriel Landeskog (LW)	(Sweden) Mika Zibanejad (C)
3	(Canada) Jonathan Huberdeau (C)	(Sweden) Jonas Brodin (D)
4	(Canada) Dougie Hamilton (D)	(Finland) Joel Armia (RW)
5	(Canada) Nathan Beaulieu (D)	(Czech Republic) Dmitrij Jaskin (RW)
6	(Canada) Sean Couturier (C)	(Sweden) Oscar Klefbom (D)
7	(Switzerland) Sven Baertschi (LW)	(Finland) Miikka Salomaki (C)
8	(Canada) Ryan Strome (C)	(Sweden) Joachim Nermark (C)
9	(Canada) Ryan Murphy (D)	(Finland) Markus Granlund (C)
10	(Canada) Duncan Siemens (D)	(Sweden) Rasmus Bengtsson (D)

Ranking	North American goalies	European goalies
1	(United States) John Gibson	(Finland) Samu Perhonen
2	(Finland) Christopher Gibson	(Sweden) Magnus Hellberg
3	(Canada) Jordan Binnington	(Czech Republic) Jaroslav Pavelka

Source: International Scouting Services May 2011 ranking.

Ranking	Top 10 skaters
1	(Canada) Ryan Nugent-Hopkins (C)
2	(Sweden) Adam Larsson (D)
3	(Canada) Sean Couturier (C)
4	(Sweden) Gabriel Landeskog (RW)
5	(Canada) Dougie Hamilton (D)
6	(Sweden) Mika Zibanejad (C)
7	(Canada) Jonathan Huberdeau (C)
8	(Canada) Ryan Murphy (D)
9	(Canada) Ryan Strome (C)
10	(Sweden) Oscar Klefbom (D)

== Selections by round ==
=== Round one ===
= NHL All-Star team ·	= NHL All-Star (Note: Players are identified as an All-Star if they were selected for the All-Star game at any time in their career.) ·	= NHL All-Star and NHL All-Star team ·

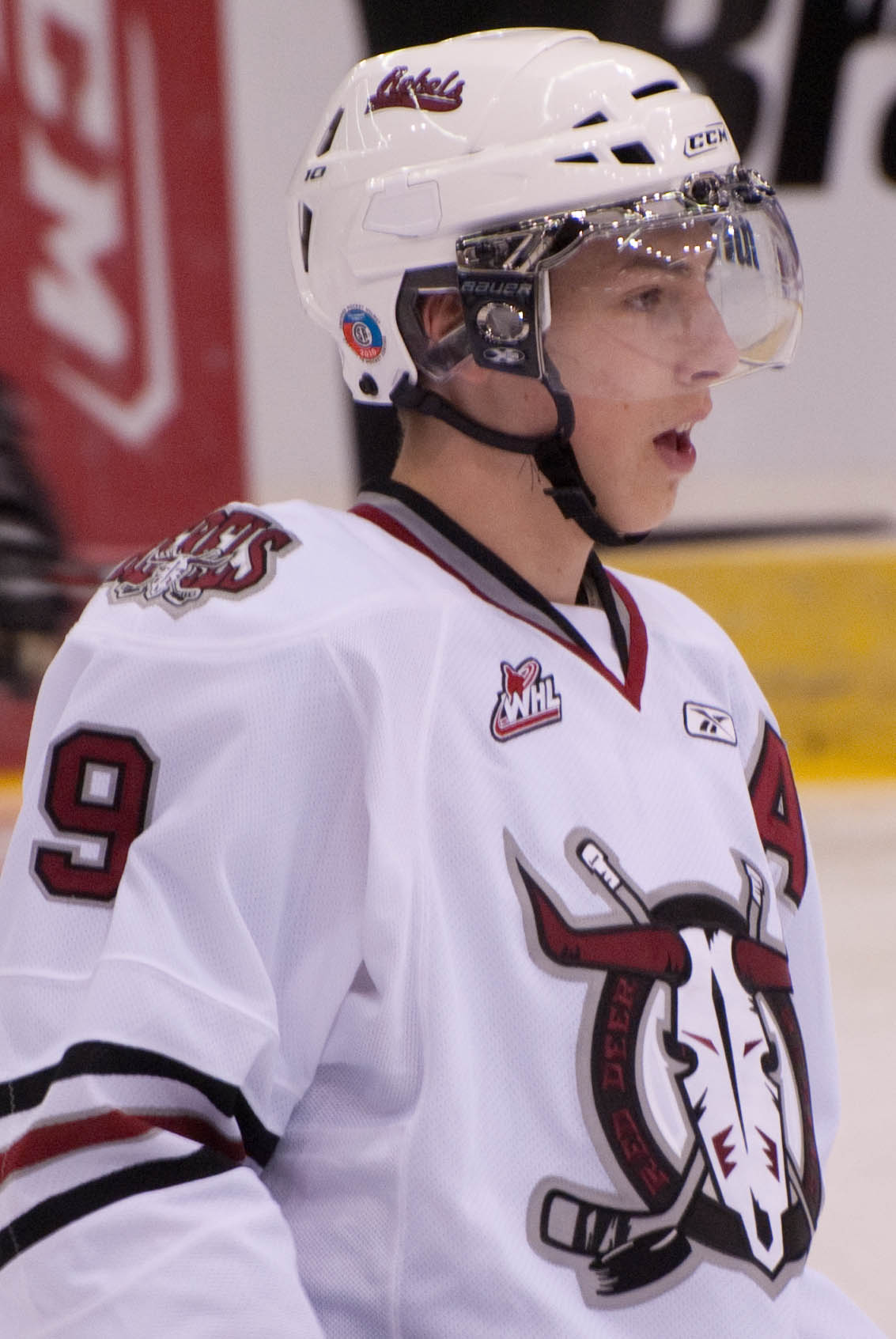
Ryan Nugent-Hopkins was selected first overall by the Edmonton Oilers.

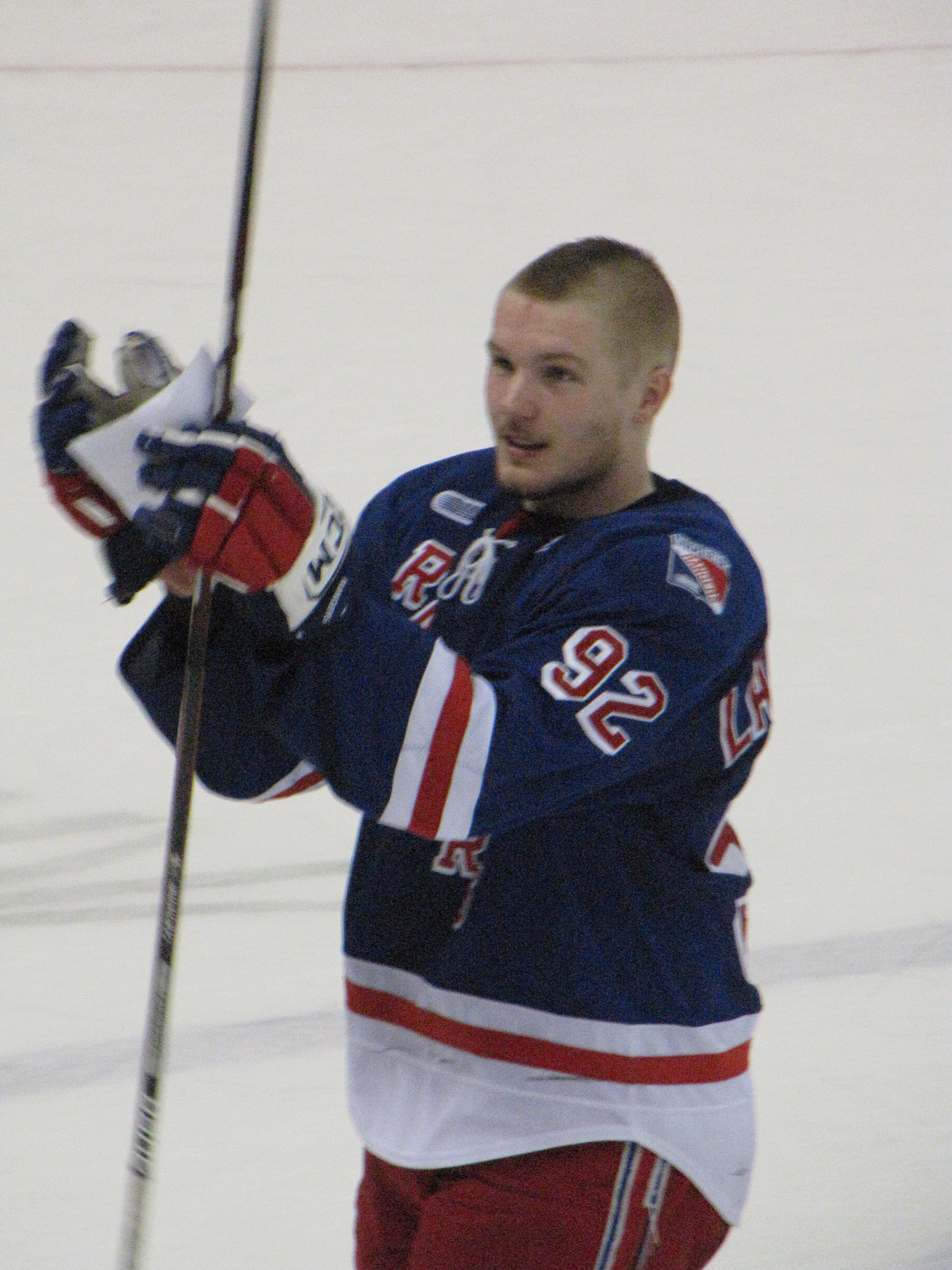
Gabriel Landeskog was selected second overall by the Colorado Avalanche.

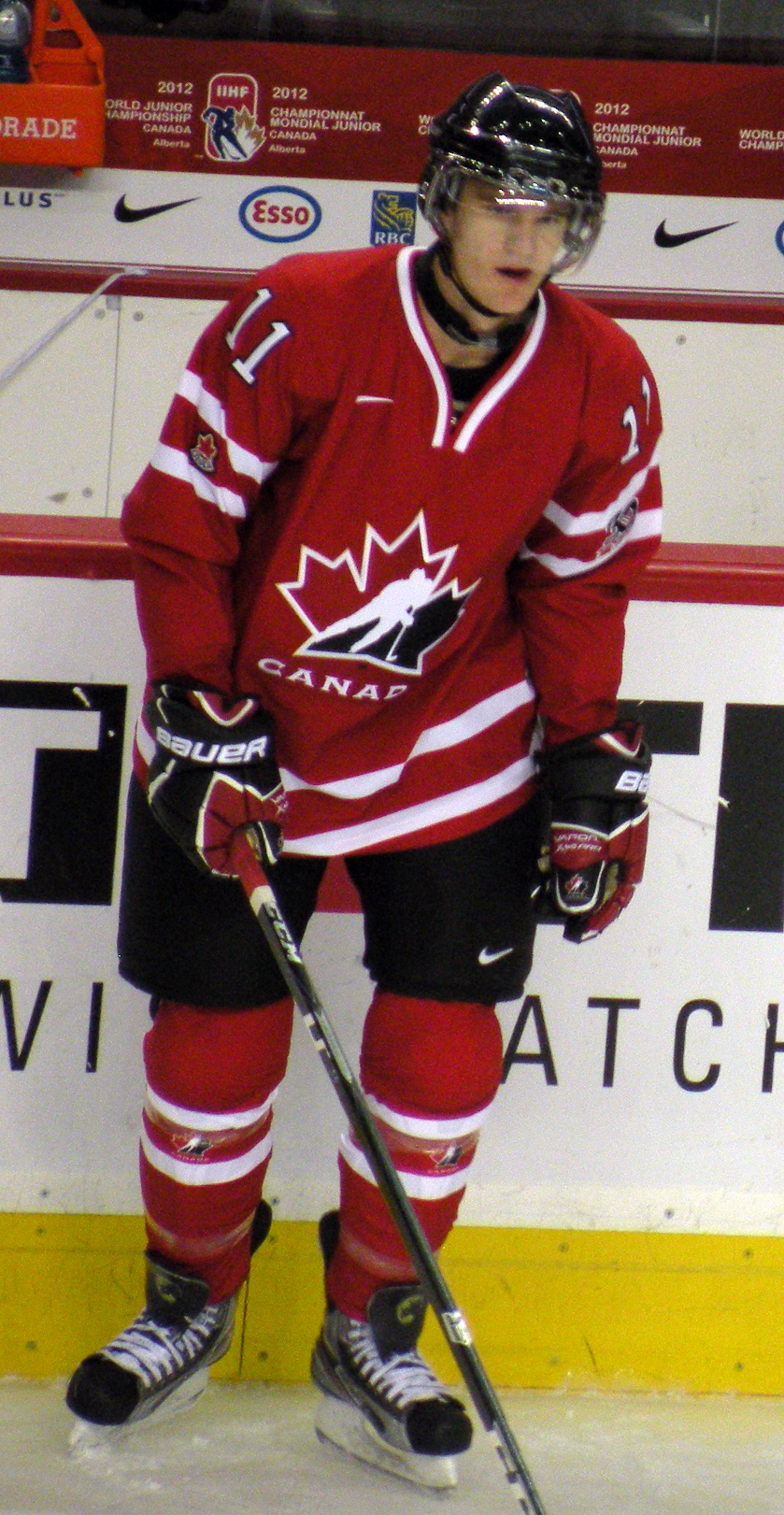
Jonathan Huberdeau was selected third overall by the Florida Panthers.

#	Player	Nationality	NHL team	College/junior/club team
1	Ryan Nugent-Hopkins (C)	Canada	Edmonton Oilers	Red Deer Rebels (WHL)
2	Gabriel Landeskog (LW)	Sweden	Colorado Avalanche	Kitchener Rangers (OHL)
3	Jonathan Huberdeau (C)	Canada	Florida Panthers	Saint John Sea Dogs (QMJHL)
4	Adam Larsson (D)	Sweden	New Jersey Devils	Skelleftea AIK (SEL)
5	Ryan Strome (C)	Canada	New York Islanders	Niagara IceDogs (OHL)
6	Mika Zibanejad (C)	Sweden	Ottawa Senators	Djurgardens IF (SEL)
7	Mark Scheifele (C)	Canada	Winnipeg Jets	Barrie Colts (OHL)
8	Sean Couturier (C)	Canada	Philadelphia Flyers (from Columbus)^{1}	Drummondville Voltigeurs (QMJHL)
9	Dougie Hamilton (D)	Canada	Boston Bruins (from Toronto)^{2}	Niagara IceDogs (OHL)
10	Jonas Brodin (D)	Sweden	Minnesota Wild	Farjestad BK (SEL)
11	Duncan Siemens (D)	Canada	Colorado Avalanche (from St. Louis)^{3}	Saskatoon Blades (WHL)
12	Ryan Murphy (D)	Canada	Carolina Hurricanes	Kitchener Rangers (OHL)
13	Sven Baertschi (LW)	Switzerland	Calgary Flames	Portland Winterhawks (WHL)
14	Jamie Oleksiak (D)	Canada	Dallas Stars	Northeastern University (Hockey East)
15	J. T. Miller (LW)	United States	New York Rangers	US NTDP (USHL)
16	Joel Armia (RW)	Finland	Buffalo Sabres	Assat (SM-liiga)
17	Nathan Beaulieu (D)	Canada	Montreal Canadiens	Saint John Sea Dogs (QMJHL)
18	Mark McNeill (C)	Canada	Chicago Blackhawks	Prince Albert Raiders (WHL)
19	Oscar Klefbom (D)	Sweden	Edmonton Oilers (from Los Angeles)^{4}	Farjestad BK (SEL)
20	Connor Murphy (D)	United States	Phoenix Coyotes	US NTDP (USHL)
21	Stefan Noesen (RW)	United States	Ottawa Senators (from Nashville)^{5}	Plymouth Whalers (OHL)
22	Tyler Biggs (RW)	United States	Toronto Maple Leafs (from Anaheim)^{6}	US NTDP (USHL)
23	Joe Morrow (D)	Canada	Pittsburgh Penguins	Portland Winterhawks (WHL)
24	Matt Puempel (LW)	Canada	Ottawa Senators (from Detroit)^{7}	Peterborough Petes (OHL)
25	Stuart Percy (D)	Canada	Toronto Maple Leafs (from Philadelphia)^{8}	Mississauga St. Michael's Majors (OHL)
26	Phillip Danault (LW)	Canada	Chicago Blackhawks (from Washington)^{9}	Victoriaville Tigres (QMJHL)
27	Vladislav Namestnikov (C)	Russia	Tampa Bay Lightning	London Knights (OHL)
28	Zack Phillips (C)	Canada	Minnesota Wild (from San Jose)^{10}	Saint John Sea Dogs (QMJHL)
29	Nicklas Jensen (LW)	Denmark	Vancouver Canucks	Oshawa Generals (OHL)
30	Rickard Rakell (RW)	Sweden	Anaheim Ducks (from Boston via Toronto)^{11}	Plymouth Whalers (OHL)

Notes

1. The Columbus Blue Jackets' first-round pick went to the Philadelphia Flyers as the result of a trade on June 23, 2011, that sent Jeff Carter to Columbus in exchange for Jakub Voracek, a third-round pick in 2011 and this pick.
2. The Toronto Maple Leafs' first-round pick went to the Boston Bruins as the result of a trade on September 18, 2009, that sent Phil Kessel to Toronto in exchange for a first-round pick in 2010, a second-round pick in 2010 and this pick.
3. The St. Louis Blues' first-round pick went to the Colorado Avalanche as the result of a trade on February 19, 2011, that sent Kevin Shattenkirk, Chris Stewart and a conditional second-round pick to the Blues in exchange for Erik Johnson, Jay McClement and this pick (being conditional at the time of the trade). The condition – St. Louis' pick was not among the top 10 picks – was converted on April 12, 2011, when St. Louis retained the 11th overall pick at the NHL Draft Lottery.
4. The Los Angeles Kings' first-round pick went to the Edmonton Oilers as the result of a trade on February 28, 2011, that sent Dustin Penner to Los Angeles in exchange for Colten Teubert, a conditional third-round pick in 2012 and this pick.
5. The Nashville Predators' first-round pick went to the Ottawa Senators as the result of a trade on February 10, 2011, that sent Mike Fisher to Nashville in exchange for a conditional pick in 2012 and this pick.
6. The Anaheim Ducks' first-round pick went to the Toronto Maple Leafs as the result of a trade on June 24, 2011, that sent Boston's first-round pick in 2011 (30th overall) and Toronto's second-round pick in 2011 (39th overall) to Anaheim in exchange for this pick.
7. The Detroit Red Wings' first-round pick went to the Ottawa Senators as the result of a trade on June 24, 2011, that sent Ottawa and Chicago's second-round picks in 2011 (35th and 48th overall) to Detroit in exchange for this pick.
8. The Philadelphia Flyers' first-round pick went to the Toronto Maple Leafs as the result of a trade on February 14, 2011, that sent Kris Versteeg to Philadelphia in exchange for a third-round pick in 2011 and this pick.
9. The Washington Capitals' first-round pick went to the Chicago Blackhawks as the result of a trade on June 24, 2011, that sent Troy Brouwer to Washington in exchange for this pick.
10. The San Jose Sharks' first-round pick went to the Minnesota Wild as the result of a trade on June 24, 2011, that sent Brent Burns and a second-round pick in 2012 to San Jose in exchange for Devin Setoguchi, Charlie Coyle and this pick.
11. The Boston Bruins' first-round pick went to the Anaheim Ducks as the result of a trade on June 24, 2011, that sent Anaheim's first-round pick in 2011 (22nd overall) to Toronto in exchange for the Maple Leafs' second-round pick in 2011 (39th overall) and this pick.
  Toronto previously acquired the pick in a trade on February 18, 2011, that sent Tomas Kaberle to Boston in exchange for Joe Colborne, a conditional second-round pick in 2012 and this pick.

=== Round two ===
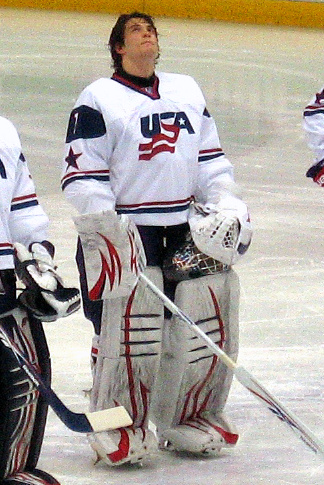
John Gibson was selected 39th overall by the Anaheim Ducks.

#	Player	Nationality	NHL team	College/junior/club team
31	David Musil (D)	Czech Republic	Edmonton Oilers	Vancouver Giants (WHL)
32	Ty Rattie (RW)	Canada	St. Louis Blues (from Colorado)^{1}	Portland Winterhawks (WHL)
33	Rocco Grimaldi (C)	United States	Florida Panthers	US NTDP (USHL)
34	Scott Mayfield (D)	United States	New York Islanders	Youngstown Phantoms (USHL)
35	Tomas Jurco (RW)	Slovakia	Detroit Red Wings (from Ottawa)^{2}	Saint John Sea Dogs (QMJHL)
36	Adam Clendening (D)	United States	Chicago Blackhawks (from Winnipeg)^{3}	Boston University (Hockey East)
37	Boone Jenner (C)	Canada	Columbus Blue Jackets	Oshawa Generals (OHL)
38	Magnus Hellberg (G)	Sweden	Nashville Predators (from New Jersey)^{4}	Almtuna IS (HockeyAllsvenskan)
39	John Gibson (G)	United States	Anaheim Ducks (from Toronto)^{5}	US NTDP (USHL)
40	Alexander Khokhlachev (C/LW)	Russia	Boston Bruins (from Minnesota)^{6}	Windsor Spitfires (OHL)
41	Dmitrij Jaskin (RW)	Czech Republic	St. Louis Blues	HC Slavia Praha (Czech Extraliga)
42	Victor Rask (C)	Sweden	Carolina Hurricanes	Leksands IF (Sweden Jrs.)
43	Brandon Saad (LW)	United States	Chicago Blackhawks (from Calgary via Toronto)^{7}	Saginaw Spirit (OHL)
44	Brett Ritchie (RW)	Canada	Dallas Stars	Sarnia Sting (OHL)
45	Markus Granlund (C)	Finland	Calgary Flames (from NY Rangers)^{8}	HIFK (SM-liiga)
46	Joel Edmundson (D)	Canada	St. Louis Blues (from Buffalo)^{9}	Moose Jaw Warriors (WHL)
47	Matt Nieto (LW)	United States	San Jose Sharks (from Montreal via Florida)^{10}	Boston University (Hockey East)
48	Xavier Ouellet (D)	Canada	Detroit Red Wings (from Chicago via Ottawa)^{11}	Montreal Junior Hockey Club (QMJHL)
49	Christopher Gibson (G)	Finland	Los Angeles Kings	Chicoutimi Sagueneens (QMJHL)
50	Johan Sundstrom (C)	Sweden	New York Islanders (from Montreal; compensatory)^{12}	Frolunda HC (SEL)
51	Alexander Ruuttu (C)	Finland	Phoenix Coyotes	Jokerit (SM-liiga)
52	Miikka Salomaki (RW)	Finland	Nashville Predators	Karpat (SM-liiga)
53	William Karlsson (C)	Sweden	Anaheim Ducks	VIK Vasteras HK (Sweden Jrs.)
54	Scott Harrington (D)	Canada	Pittsburgh Penguins	London Knights (OHL)
55	Ryan Sproul (D)	Canada	Detroit Red Wings	Sault Ste. Marie Greyhounds (OHL)
56	Lucas Lessio (LW)	Canada	Phoenix Coyotes (from Philadelphia)^{13}	Oshawa Generals (OHL)
57	Tyler Wotherspoon (D)	Canada	Calgary Flames (from Washington via Carolina and NY Rangers)^{14}	Portland Winterhawks (WHL)
58	Nikita Kucherov (W)	Russia	Tampa Bay Lightning	CSKA Moscow (KHL)
59	Rasmus Bengtsson (D)	Sweden	Florida Panthers (from San Jose)^{15}	Rogle BK (Sweden Jrs.)
60	Mario Lucia (LW)	United States	Minnesota Wild (from Vancouver)^{16}	Wayzata High School (USHS–MN)
61	Shane Prince (C)	United States	Ottawa Senators (from Boston)^{17}	Ottawa 67's (OHL)

Notes

1. The Colorado Avalanche's second-round pick went to the St. Louis Blues as the result of a trade on February 19, 2011, that sent Erik Johnson, Jay McClement and a conditional first-round pick to Colorado in exchange for Kevin Shattenkirk, Chris Stewart and this pick (being conditional at the time of the trade). The condition – St. Louis' pick was not among the top 10 picks – was converted on April 12, 2011, when St. Louis retained the 11th overall pick at the NHL Draft Lottery.
2. The Ottawa Senators' second-round pick went to the Detroit Red Wings as the result of a trade on June 24, 2011, that sent a first-round pick in 2011 (24th overall) to Ottawa in exchange for Chicago's second-round pick in 2011 (#48 overall) and this pick.
3. The Winnipeg Jets' second-round pick went to the Chicago Blackhawks as the result of a trade on July 1, 2010, that sent Andrew Ladd to the Atlanta Thrashers in exchange for Ivan Vishnevskiy and this pick.
4. The New Jersey Devils' second-round pick went to the Nashville Predators as the result of a trade on June 19, 2010, that sent Jason Arnott to New Jersey in exchange for Matthew Halischuk and this pick.
5. The Toronto Maple Leafs' second-round pick went to the Anaheim Ducks as the result of a trade on June 24, 2011, that sent Anaheim's first-round pick in 2011 (22nd overall) to Toronto in exchange for Boston's first-round pick in 2011 (30th overall) and this pick.
6. The Minnesota Wild's second-round pick went to the Boston Bruins as the result of a trade on October 18, 2009, that sent Chuck Kobasew to Minnesota in exchange for Craig Weller, Alexander Fallstrom and this pick.
7. The Calgary Flames' second-round pick went to the Chicago Blackhawks as the result of a trade on September 5, 2009, that sent Toronto's second-round pick in 2010 to Toronto in exchange for a third-round pick in 2011 and this pick.
  Toronto previously acquired this pick as the result of a trade on July 27, 2009, that sent Anton Stralman, Colin Stuart and a seventh-round draft pick in 2012 to Calgary in exchange for Wayne Primeau and this pick.
8. The New York Rangers' second round pick went to the Calgary Flames as the result of a trade on June 1, 2011, that sent Tim Erixon and a fifth-round pick in 2011 to New York in exchange for Roman Horak, Washington's second-round pick in 2011 and this pick.
9. The Buffalo Sabres' second round pick went to the St. Louis Blues as the result of a trade on February 27, 2011, that sent Brad Boyes to Buffalo in exchange for this pick.
10. The Montreal Canadiens' second-round pick went to the San Jose Sharks as the result of a trade on June 25, 2011, that sent San Jose's second-round pick in 2011 (59th overall) and third-round pick in 2012 to Florida in exchange for this pick.
  Florida previously acquired the pick as the result of a trade on February 11, 2010, that sent Dominic Moore to Montreal in exchange for this pick.
11. The Chicago Blackhawks' second-round pick went to the Detroit Red Wings as the result of a trade on June 24, 2011, that sent Detroit's first-round pick in 2011 (24th overall) to the Ottawa Senators in exchange for Ottawa's second-round pick in 2011 (#35 overall) and this pick.
  Ottawa previously acquired the pick as the result of a trade on February 28, 2011, that sent Chris Campoli and a conditional seventh-round pick in 2012 to Chicago in exchange for Ryan Potulny and this pick (being conditional at the time of the trade). The condition – Chicago had until 48 hours before the start of the 2011 Entry Draft to determine if they send their own second-round pick or one of the picks acquired from Atlanta and Calgary to Ottawa – was converted on June 23, 2011.
12. The Montreal Canadiens' compensatory second-round pick (50th overall) went to the New York Islanders as the result of a trade on December 28, 2010, that sent James Wisniewski to Montreal in exchange for a conditional fifth-round pick in 2012 or a fourth-round pick in 2013 if Montreal trades their 2012 fifth-round pick and this pick.
  Montreal previously received the pick as compensation for not signing 2006 first-round pick David Fischer before August 15, 2010.
13. The Philadelphia Flyers' second-round pick went to the Phoenix Coyotes as the result of a trade on March 4, 2009, that sent Daniel Carcillo to Philadelphia in exchange for Scottie Upshall and this pick.
14. The Washington Capitals' second-round pick went to the Calgary Flames as the result of a trade on June 1, 2011, that sent Tim Erixon and Calgary's fifth-round pick in 2011 to New York in exchange for Roman Horak, New York's second-round pick in 2011 and this pick.
  The Rangers previously acquired the pick as the result of a trade on June 26, 2010, that sent Bobby Sanguinetti to Carolina in exchange for Carolina's sixth-round pick in 2010 and this pick.
  Carolina previously acquired the pick as the result of a trade on March 3, 2010, that sent Joe Corvo to Washington in exchange for Brian Pothier, Oskar Osala and this pick.
15. The San Jose Sharks' second-round pick went to the Florida Panthers as the result of a trade on June 25, 2011, that sent Montreal's second-round pick in 2011 (47th overall) to San Jose in exchange for San Jose's third-round pick in 2012 and this pick.
16. The Vancouver Canucks' second-round pick went to the Minnesota Wild as the result of a trade on June 25, 2011, that sent Minnesota's third and fourth-round picks in 2011 (71st and 101st overall) to Vancouver in exchange for this pick.
17. The Boston Bruins' second-round pick went to the Ottawa Senators as the result of a trade on February 15, 2011, that sent Chris Kelly to Boston in exchange for this pick.

=== Round three ===
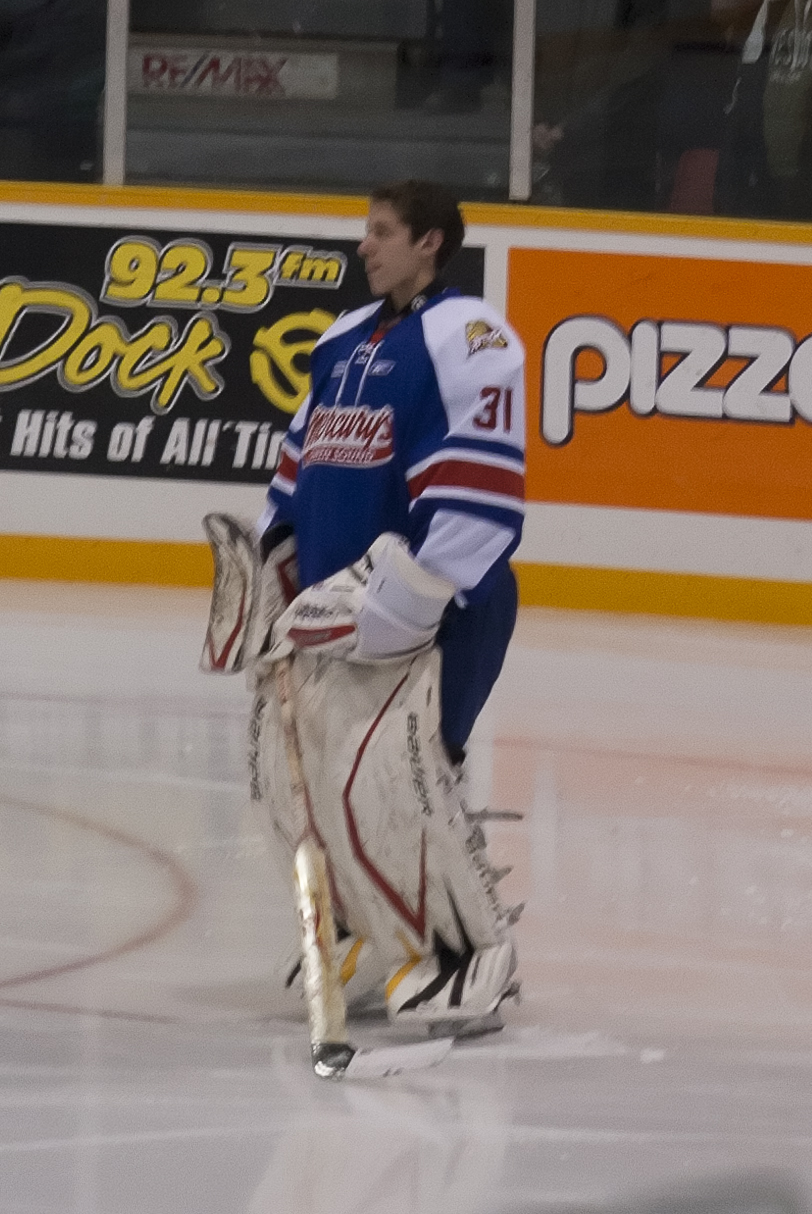
Jordan Binnington was selected 88th overall by the St. Louis Blues.

#	Player	Nationality	NHL team	College/junior/club team
62	Samu Perhonen (G)	Finland	Edmonton Oilers	Jyp Jr. (Finland Jr.)
63	Andrey Pedan (D)	Russia	New York Islanders (from Colorado)^{1}	Guelph Storm (OHL)
64	Vincent Trocheck (C)	United States	Florida Panthers	Saginaw Spirit (OHL)
65	Joseph Cramarossa (C)	Canada	Anaheim Ducks (from NY Islanders)^{2}	Mississauga St. Michael's Majors (OHL)
66	T. J. Tynan (C)	United States	Columbus Blue Jackets (from Ottawa)^{3}	Notre Dame Fighting Irish (CCHA)
67	Adam Lowry (LW)	Canada	Winnipeg Jets	Swift Current Broncos (WHL)
68	Nick Cousins (C)	Canada	Philadelphia Flyers (from Columbus)^{4}	Sault Ste. Marie Greyhounds (OHL)
~~69~~	Forfeited pick^{5}		~~New Jersey Devils~~	
70	Michael Paliotta (D)	United States	Chicago Blackhawks (from Toronto)^{6}	US NTDP (USHL)
71	David Honzik (G)	Czech Republic	Vancouver Canucks (from Minnesota)^{7}	Victoriaville Tigres (QMJHL)
72	Steven Fogarty (C)	United States	New York Rangers (from St. Louis)^{8}	Edina High School (USHS–MN)
73	Keegan Lowe (D)	United States	Carolina Hurricanes	Edmonton Oil Kings (WHL)
74	Travis Ewanyk (LW)	Canada	Edmonton Oilers (from Calgary)^{9}	Edmonton Oil Kings (WHL)
75	Blake Coleman (C)	United States	New Jersey Devils (from Dallas)^{10}	Indiana Ice (USHL)
76	Logan Shaw (RW)	Canada	Florida Panthers (from NY Rangers)^{11}	Cape Breton Screaming Eagles (QMJHL)
77	Daniel Catenacci (C)	Canada	Buffalo Sabres	Sault Ste. Marie Greyhounds (OHL)
78	Brennan Serville (D)	Canada	Winnipeg Jets (from Montreal)^{12}	Stouffville Spirit (OJHL)
79	Klas Dahlbeck (D)	Sweden	Chicago Blackhawks	Linkopings HC (SEL)
80	Andy Andreoff (C)	Canada	Los Angeles Kings	Oshawa Generals (OHL)
81	Anthony Camara (LW)	Canada	Boston Bruins (from Phoenix)^{13}	Saginaw Spirit (OHL)
82	Nick Shore (C)	United States	Los Angeles Kings (from Nashville)^{14}	University of Denver (WCHA)
83	Andy Welinski (D)	United States	Anaheim Ducks	Green Bay Gamblers (USHL)
84	Harrison Ruopp (D)	Canada	Phoenix Coyotes (from Pittsburgh via Philadelphia)^{15}	Prince Albert Raiders (WHL)
85	Alan Quine (C)	Canada	Detroit Red Wings	Peterborough Petes (OHL)
86	Josh Leivo (LW)	Canada	Toronto Maple Leafs (from Philadelphia)^{16}	Sudbury Wolves (OHL)
87	Jonathan Racine (D)	Canada	Florida Panthers (from Washington)^{17}	Shawinigan Cataractes (QMJHL)
88	Jordan Binnington (G)	Canada	St. Louis Blues (from Tampa Bay)^{18}	Owen Sound Attack (OHL)
89	Justin Sefton (D)	Canada	San Jose Sharks	Sudbury Wolves (OHL)
90	Alexandre Grenier (RW)	Canada	Vancouver Canucks	Halifax Mooseheads (QMJHL)
91	Kyle Rau (C)	United States	Florida Panthers (from Boston)^{19}	Eden Prairie High School (USHS–MN)

Notes

1. The Colorado Avalanche's third-round pick went to the New York Islanders as the result of a trade on June 26, 2010, that sent a fourth-round pick in 2010 to Colorado in exchange for this pick.
2. The New York Islanders' third-round pick went to the Anaheim Ducks as the result of a trade on July 30, 2010, that sent James Wisniewski to New York in exchange for this pick (being conditional at the time of the trade). The condition – New York had to choose to send either their own pick or the pick previously acquired from Colorado, until June 1, 2011 – was converted at an unknown date.
3. The Ottawa Senators' third-round pick went to the Columbus Blue Jackets as the result of a trade on June 25, 2011, that sent Nikita Filatov to Ottawa in exchange for this pick.
4. The Columbus Blue Jackets' third-round pick went to the Philadelphia Flyers as the result of a trade on June 23, 2011, that sent Jeff Carter to Columbus in exchange for Jakub Voracek, a first-round pick in 2011 and this pick.
5. The New Jersey Devils' third-round pick was forfeited as the result of a penalty sanction due to cap circumvention when signing Ilya Kovalchuk. The penalty includes a fine of $3 million, a forfeiture of one first-round pick between 2011 and 2014 as determined by the Devils (forfeited in 2014), and this pick.
6. The Toronto Maple Leafs' third-round pick went to the Chicago Blackhawks as the result of a trade on September 5, 2009, that sent Toronto's own second-round pick in 2010 back to Toronto in exchange for Calgary's second-round pick in 2011 and this pick.
7. The Minnesota Wild's third-round pick went to the Vancouver Canucks as the result of a trade on June 25, 2011, that sent a second-round pick in 2011 (60th overall) to Minnesota in exchange for a fourth-round pick in 2011 (101st overall) and this pick.
8. The St. Louis Blues' third-round pick went to the New York Rangers as the result of a trade on June 25, 2011, that sent Evgeny Grachyov to St. Louis in exchange for this pick.
9. The Calgary Flames' third-round pick went to the Edmonton Oilers as the result of a trade on March 3, 2010, that sent Steve Staios to the Flames in exchange for Aaron Johnson and this pick (being conditional at the time of the trade). The condition – Calgary elects to transfer its own third-round pick in 2011 instead of 2010 – was converted on June 26, 2010, when Calgary retained their 2010 pick (73rd overall).
10. The Dallas Stars' third-round pick went to the New Jersey Devils as the result of a trade on January 7, 2011, that sent Jamie Langenbrunner to Dallas in exchange for a conditional pick in 2012 and this pick (being conditional at the time of the trade). The condition – Dallas does not win a round of the 2011 Stanley Cup playoffs and does not re-sign Langenbrunner prior to the 2011 Draft – was converted on June 24, 2011.
11. The New York Rangers' third-round pick went to the Florida Panthers as the result of a trade on February 26, 2011, that sent Bryan McCabe to New York in exchange for Tim Kennedy and this pick.
12. The Montreal Canadiens' third-round pick went to the Winnipeg Jets as the result of a trade on June 25, 2011, that sent Winnipeg's and Montreal's own fourth-round picks in 2011 (97th and 108th overall) to Montreal in exchange for this pick.
13. The Phoenix Coyotes' third-round pick went to the Boston Bruins as the result of a trade on March 3, 2010, that sent Derek Morris to Phoenix in exchange for this pick (being conditional at the time of the trade). The condition – Morris is re-signed by Phoenix for the 2010–11 season – was converted on July 1, 2010.
14. The Nashville Predators' third-round pick went to the Los Angeles Kings as the result of a trade on June 25, 2011, that sent Los Angeles' sixth-round pick in 2011 (170th overall) and Toronto's third-round pick in 2012 to Nashville in exchange for this pick.
15. The Pittsburgh Penguins' third-round pick went to the Phoenix Coyotes as the result of a trade on June 7, 2011, that sent Ilya Bryzgalov to Philadelphia in exchange for Matt Clackson, future considerations and this conditional pick. The condition – Philadelphia signs Bryzgalov before the start of the third round of the draft – was converted on June 23, 2011.
  Philadelphia previously acquired the pick as the result of a trade on June 25, 2010, that sent Dan Hamhuis to Pittsburgh in exchange for this pick.
16. The Philadelphia Flyers' third-round pick went to the Toronto Maple Leafs as the result of a trade on February 14, 2011, that sent Kris Versteeg to Philadelphia in exchange for a first-round pick in 2011 and this pick.
17. The Washington Capitals' third-round pick went to the Florida Panthers as the result of a trade on February 28, 2011, that sent Dennis Wideman to Washington in exchange for Jake Hauswirth and this pick.
18. The Tampa Bay Lightning's third-round pick went to the St. Louis Blues as a result of a trade on February 18, 2011, that sent Eric Brewer to Tampa Bay in exchange for Brock Beukeboom and this pick.
19. The Boston Bruins' third-round pick went to the Florida Panthers as the result of a trade on June 22, 2010, that sent Nathan Horton and Gregory Campbell to Boston in exchange for Dennis Wideman, Boston's first-round pick in 2010 and this pick.

=== Round four ===
#	Player	Nationality	NHL team	College/junior/club team
92	Dillon Simpson (D)	Canada	Edmonton Oilers	University of North Dakota (WCHA)
93	Joachim Nermark (C)	Sweden	Colorado Avalanche	Linkopings HC (SEL)
94	Josh Shalla (LW)	Canada	Nashville Predators (from Florida)^{1}	Saginaw Spirit (OHL)
95	Robbie Russo (D)	United States	New York Islanders	US NTDP (USHL)
96	Jean-Gabriel Pageau (C)	Canada	Ottawa Senators	Gatineau Olympiques (QMJHL)
97	Josiah Didier (D)	United States	Montreal Canadiens (from Winnipeg)^{2}	Cedar Rapids RoughRiders (USHL)
98	Mike Reilly (D)	United States	Columbus Blue Jackets	Shattuck-Saint Mary's (Midget Major AAA)
99	Reid Boucher (C)	United States	New Jersey Devils	US NTDP (USHL)
100	Tom Nilsson (D)	Sweden	Toronto Maple Leafs	Mora IK (Sweden Jrs.)
101	Joseph LaBate (C)	United States	Vancouver Canucks (from Minnesota)^{3}	Academy of Holy Angels (USHS–MN)
102	Yannick Veilleux (LW)	Canada	St. Louis Blues	Shawinigan Cataractes (QMJHL)
103	Gregory Hofmann (C)	Switzerland	Carolina Hurricanes	HC Ambri-Piotta (NLA)
104	Johnny Gaudreau (LW)	United States	Calgary Flames	Dubuque Fighting Saints (USHL)
105	Emil Molin (C)	Sweden	Dallas Stars	Brynas IF Jr. (J20 Superelit)
106	Michael St. Croix (C)	Canada	New York Rangers	Edmonton Oil Kings (WHL)
107	Colin Jacobs (C)	United States	Buffalo Sabres	Seattle Thunderbirds (WHL)
108	Oliver Archambault (LW)	Canada	Montreal Canadiens (from Montreal via Winnipeg)^{4}	Val-d'Or Foreurs (QMJHL)
109	Maxim Shalunov (RW)	Russia	Chicago Blackhawks	Traktor Chelyabinsk (Russia-KHL)
110	Michael Mersch (LW)	United States	Los Angeles Kings	University of Wisconsin (WCHA)
111	Kale Kessy (LW)	Canada	Phoenix Coyotes	Medicine Hat Tigers (WHL)
112	Garrett Noonan (D)	United States	Nashville Predators	Boston University (Hockey East)
113	Magnus Nygren (D)	Sweden	Montreal Canadiens (from Anaheim)^{5}	Farjestad BK (SEL)
114	Tobias Rieder (C)	Germany	Edmonton Oilers (from Pittsburgh)^{6}	Kitchener Rangers (OHL)
115	Marek Tvrdon (RW)	Slovakia	Detroit Red Wings	Vancouver Giants (WHL)
116	Colin Suellentrop (D)	United States	Philadelphia Flyers	Oshawa Generals (OHL)
117	Steffen Soberg (G)	Norway	Washington Capitals	Manglerud Star (Norway-GET-ligaen)
118	Marcel Noebels (LW)	Germany	Philadelphia Flyers (from Tampa Bay)^{7}	Seattle Thunderbirds (WHL)
119	Zach Yuen (D)	Canada	Winnipeg Jets (from San Jose)^{8}	Tri-City Americans (WHL)
120	Ludwig Blomstrand (LW)	Sweden	Vancouver Canucks	Djurgardens IF Jr. (Sweden Jrs.)
121	Brian Ferlin (RW)	United States	Boston Bruins	Indiana Ice (USHL)

Notes

1. The Florida Panthers' fourth-round pick went to the Nashville Predators as the result of a trade on August 5, 2010, that sent Mike Santorelli to Florida in exchange for this pick (being conditional at the time of the trade). The condition which upgraded the original fifth-round pick to this pick is unknown.
2. The Winnipeg Jets' fourth-round pick went to the Montreal Canadiens as the result of a trade on June 25, 2011, that sent Montreal's third-round pick in 2011 (78th overall) to Winnipeg in exchange for Montreal's fourth-round pick in 2011 (108th overall) and this pick.
3. The Minnesota Wild's fourth-round pick went to the Vancouver Canucks as the result of a trade on June 25, 2011, that sent Vancouver's second-round pick in 2011 (60th overall) to Minnesota in exchange for the Minnesota's third-round pick in 2011 (71st overall) and this pick.
4. The Montreal Canadiens' fourth-round pick was re-acquired from the Winnipeg Jets as the result of a trade on June 25, 2011, that sent Montreal's third-round pick in 2011 (78th overall) to Winnipeg in exchange for Winnipeg's fourth-round pick in 2011 (97th overall) and this pick.
  Winnipeg previously acquired the pick as the result of a trade on February 24, 2011, that sent Brent Sopel and Nigel Dawes from the Atlanta Thrashers to Montreal in exchange for Ben Maxwell and this pick.
5. The Anaheim Ducks' fourth-round pick went to the Montreal Canadiens as the result of a trade on December 2, 2009, that sent Kyle Chipchura to Anaheim in exchange for this pick.
6. The Pittsburgh Penguins' fourth-round pick went to the Edmonton Oilers as the result of a trade on January 17, 2009, that sent Mathieu Garon to Pittsburgh in exchange for Dany Sabourin, Ryan Stone and this pick.
7. The Tampa Bay Lightning's fourth-round pick went to the Philadelphia Flyers as the result of a trade on July 19, 2010, that sent Simon Gagne to Tampa Bay in exchange for Matt Walker and this pick.
8. The San Jose Sharks' fourth-round pick went to the Winnipeg Jets as the result of a trade on June 25, 2011, that sent Carolina's fifth-round pick and Calgary's seventh-round pick both in 2011 (133rd and 194th overall) to San Jose in exchange for this pick.

=== Round five ===
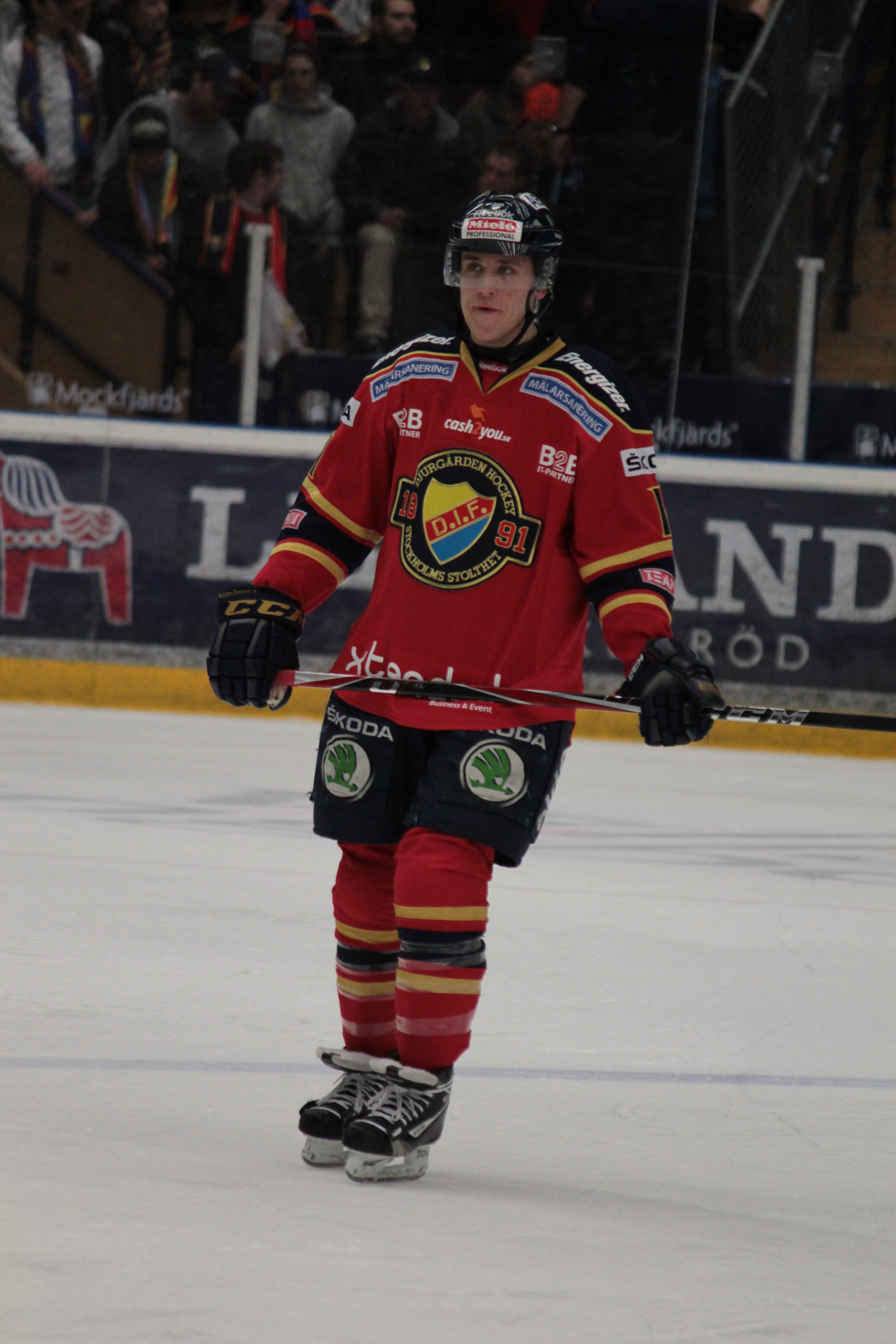
Fredrik Claesson was selected 126th overall by the Ottawa Senators.

#	Player	Nationality	NHL team	College/junior/club team
122	Martin Gernat (D)	Slovakia	Edmonton Oilers	HC Kosice Jr (Slovak Jr.)
123	Garrett Meurs (C)	Canada	Colorado Avalanche	Plymouth Whalers (OHL)
124	Yaroslav Kosov (F)	Russia	Florida Panthers	Metallurg Magnitogorsk-2 (MHL)
125	John Persson (LW)	Sweden	New York Islanders	Red Deer Rebels (WHL)
126	Fredrik Claesson (D)	Sweden	Ottawa Senators	Djurgardens IF (SEL)
127	Brenden Kichton (D)	Canada	New York Islanders (from Winnipeg)^{1}	Spokane Chiefs (WHL)
128	Seth Ambroz (RW)	United States	Columbus Blue Jackets	Omaha Lancers (USHL)
129	Blake Pietila (LW)	United States	New Jersey Devils	US NTDP (USHL)
130	Tony Cameranesi (C)	United States	Toronto Maple Leafs	Wayzata High School (USHS–MN)
131	Nick Seeler (D)	United States	Minnesota Wild	Eden Prairie High School (USHS–MN)
132	Niklas Lundstrom (G)	Sweden	St. Louis Blues	AIK IF (SEL)
133	Sean Kuraly (C)	United States	San Jose Sharks (from Carolina via Florida and Winnipeg)^{2}	Indiana Ice (USHL)
134	Shane McColgan (RW)	United States	New York Rangers (from Calgary)^{3}	Kelowna Rockets (WHL)
135	Troy Vance (D)	United States	Dallas Stars	Victoriaville Tigres (QMJHL)
136	Samuel Noreau (D)	Canada	New York Rangers	Baie-Comeau Drakkar (QMJHL)
137	Alex Lepkowski (D)	United States	Buffalo Sabres	Barrie Colts (OHL)
138	Darren Dietz (D)	Canada	Montreal Canadiens	Saskatoon Blades (WHL)
139	Andrew Shaw (C)	Canada	Chicago Blackhawks	Owen Sound Attack (OHL)
140	Joel Lowry (LW)	Canada	Los Angeles Kings	Victoria Grizzlies (BCHL)
141	Darian Dziurzynski (LW)	Canada	Phoenix Coyotes	Saskatoon Blades (WHL)
142	Simon Karlsson (D)	Sweden	Nashville Predators	Malmo Redhawks (Sweden Jrs.)
143	Max Friberg (LW)	Sweden	Anaheim Ducks	Skovde IK (Sweden Tier III)
144	Dominik Uher (C)	Czech Republic	Pittsburgh Penguins	Spokane Chiefs (WHL)
145	Philippe Hudon (C/RW)	Canada	Detroit Red Wings	Choate Rosemary Hall (USHS–CT)
146	Mattias Backman (D)	Sweden	Detroit Red Wings (from Philadelphia)^{4}	Linkopings HC (SEL)
147	Patrick Koudys (D)	Canada	Washington Capitals	Rensselaer Polytechnic Institute (ECAC)
148	Nikita Nesterov (D)	Russia	Tampa Bay Lightning	Belye Medvedi (Russia-MHL)
149	Austen Brassard (RW)	Canada	Winnipeg Jets (from San Jose)^{5}	Belleville Bulls (OHL)
150	Frank Corrado (D)	Canada	Vancouver Canucks	Sudbury Wolves (OHL)
151	Rob O'Gara (D)	United States	Boston Bruins	Milton Academy (USHS-MA)

Notes

1. The Winnipeg Jets' fifth-round pick went to the New York Islanders as the result of a trade on June 26, 2010, that sent the New York Islanders and New York Rangers' sixth-round picks in 2010 to the Atlanta Thrashers in exchange for this pick.
2. The Carolina Hurricanes' fifth-round pick went to the San Jose Sharks as the result of a trade on June 25, 2011, that sent San Jose's fourth-round pick in 2011 (119th overall) to Winnipeg in exchange for Calgary's seventh-round pick in 2011 (194th overall) and this pick.
  Winnipeg previously acquired the pick as the result of a trade on February 28, 2011, that sent Niclas Bergfors and Patrick Rissmiller from the Atlanta Thrashers to Florida in exchange for Radek Dvorak and this pick.
  Florida previously acquired this pick as the result of a trade on February 24, 2011, that sent Cory Stillman to Carolina in exchange for Ryan Carter and this pick.
3. The Calgary Flames' fifth-round pick went to the New York Rangers as the result of a trade on June 1, 2011, that sent Roman Horak and Washington and New York's second-round picks in 2011 to Calgary in exchange for Tim Erixon and this pick.
4. The Philadelphia Flyers' fifth-round pick went to the Detroit Red Wings as the result of a trade on February 6, 2010, that sent Ville Leino to Philadelphia in exchange for Ole-Kristian Tollefsen and this pick.
5. The San Jose Sharks' fifth-round pick went to the Winnipeg Jets as the result of a trade on January 18, 2011, that sent Ben Eager from the Atlanta Thrashers to San Jose in exchange for this pick.

=== Round six ===
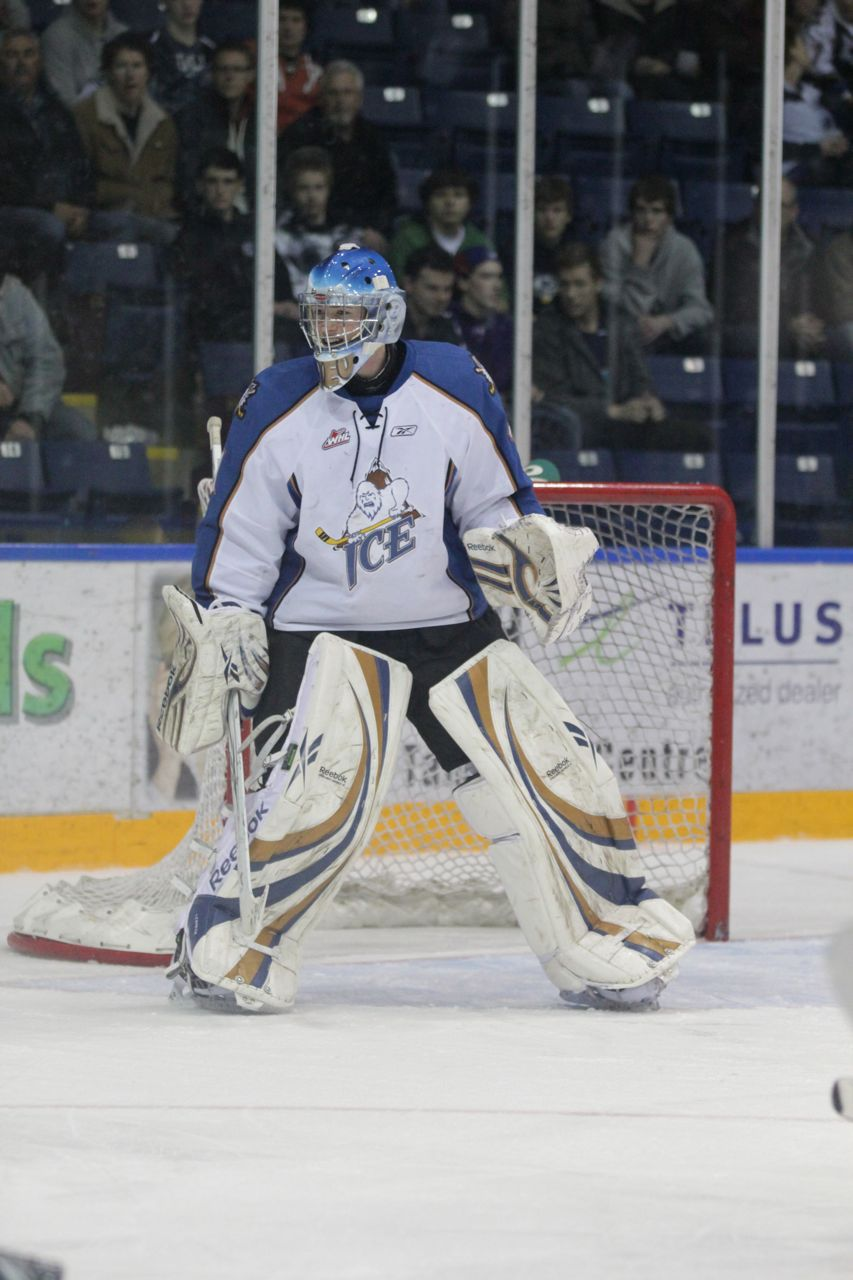
Nathan Lieuwen was selected 167th overall by the Buffalo Sabres.

#	Player	Nationality	NHL team	College/junior/club team
152	David Broll (LW)	Canada	Toronto Maple Leafs (from Edmonton)^{1}	Sault Ste. Marie Greyhounds (OHL)
153	Gabriel Beaupre (D)	Canada	Colorado Avalanche	Val-d'Or Foreurs (QMJHL)
154	Edward Wittchow (D)	United States	Florida Panthers	Burnsville High School (USHS–MN)
155	Andrew Fritsch (RW)	Canada	Phoenix Coyotes (from NY Islanders)^{2}	Owen Sound Attack (OHL)
156	Darren Kramer (C)	Canada	Ottawa Senators	Spokane Chiefs (WHL)
157	Jason Kasdorf (G)	Canada	Winnipeg Jets	Portage Terriers (MJHL)
158	Lukas Sedlak (C)	Czech Republic	Columbus Blue Jackets	HC Mountfield Jr. (Czech Jr.)
159	Reece Scarlett (D)	Canada	New Jersey Devils	Swift Current Broncos (WHL)
160	Josh Manson (D)	Canada	Anaheim Ducks (from Toronto)^{3}	Salmon Arm Silverbacks (BCHL)
161	Stephen Michalek (G)	United States	Minnesota Wild	Loomis Chaffee School (USHS–CT)
162	Ryan Tesink (C)	Canada	St. Louis Blues	Saint John Sea Dogs (QMJHL)
163	Matt Mahalak (G)	United States	Carolina Hurricanes	Plymouth Whalers (OHL)
164	Laurent Brossoit (G)	Canada	Calgary Flames	Edmonton Oil Kings (WHL)
165	Matej Stransky (RW)	Czech Republic	Dallas Stars	Saskatoon Blades (WHL)
166	Daniil Sobchenko (C)	Russia	San Jose Sharks (from NY Rangers)^{4}	Lokomotiv Yaroslavl (KHL)
167	Nathan Lieuwen (G)	Canada	Buffalo Sabres	Kootenay Ice (WHL)
168	Daniel Pribyl (C)	Czech Republic	Montreal Canadiens	Sparta Prague Jr. (Czech Jr.)
169	Sam Jardine (D)	Canada	Chicago Blackhawks	Camrose Kodiaks (AJHL)
170	Chase Balisy (C)	United States	Nashville Predators (from Los Angeles)^{5}	Western Michigan University (CCHA)
171	Max McCormick (LW)	United States	Ottawa Senators (from Phoenix via Anaheim)^{6}	Sioux City Musketeers (USHL)
172	Peter Ceresnak (D)	Slovakia	New York Rangers (from Nashville)^{7}	Dukla Trencin Jr. (Slovak Jr.)
173	Dennis Robertson (D)	Canada	Toronto Maple Leafs (from Anaheim)^{8}	Brown University (ECAC)
174	Josh Archibald (W)	United States	Pittsburgh Penguins	Brainerd High School (USHS–MN)
175	Richard Nedomlel (D)	Czech Republic	Detroit Red Wings	Swift Current Broncos (WHL)
176	Petr Placek (RW)	Czech Republic	Philadelphia Flyers	Hotchkiss School (USHS-CT)
177	Travis Boyd (C)	United States	Washington Capitals	US NTDP (USHL)
178	Adam Wilcox (G)	United States	Tampa Bay Lightning	Green Bay Gamblers (USHL)
179	Dylan DeMelo (D)	Canada	San Jose Sharks	Mississauga St. Michael's Majors (OHL)
180	Pathrik Vesterholm (C)	Sweden	Vancouver Canucks	Malmo Redhawks (Sweden Jrs.)
181	Lars Volden (G)	Norway	Boston Bruins	Blues Jr. (Finland Jr.)

Notes

1. The Edmonton Oilers' sixth-round pick went to the Toronto Maple Leafs as the result of a trade on June 26, 2010, that sent Phoenix's seventh-round pick in 2010 to Edmonton in exchange for this pick.
2. The New York Islanders' sixth-round pick went to the Phoenix Coyotes as the result of a trade on February 9, 2011, that sent Al Montoya to New York in exchange for this pick.
3. The Toronto Maple Leafs' sixth-round pick went to the Anaheim Ducks as the result of a trade on June 25, 2011, that sent Anaheim's sixth-round pick in 2012 to Toronto in exchange for this pick.
4. The New York Rangers' sixth-round pick went to the San Jose Sharks as the result of a trade on February 12, 2010, that sent Jody Shelley to New York in exchange for this pick (being conditional at the time of the trade). The condition – Shelley does not re-sign with New York prior to the 2010–11 season. – was converted on July 1, 2010, when the player was signed by the Philadelphia Flyers.
5. The Los Angeles Kings' sixth-round pick went to the Nashville Predators as the result of a trade on June 25, 2011, that sent Nashville's third-round pick in 2011 (82nd overall) to Los Angeles in exchange for Toronto's third-round pick in 2012 and this pick.
6. The Phoenix Coyotes' sixth-round pick went to the Ottawa Senators as the result of a trade on February 17, 2011, that sent Jarkko Ruutu to Anaheim in exchange for this pick.
  Anaheim previously acquired the pick as the result of a trade on March 3, 2010, that sent Petteri Nokelainen to Phoenix in exchange for this pick.
7. The Nashville Predators' sixth-round pick went to the New York Rangers as the result of a trade on June 25, 2011, that sent New York's sixth-round pick in 2012 to Nashville in exchange for this pick.
8. The Anaheim Ducks' sixth-round pick went the Toronto Maple Leafs as the result of a trade on August 10, 2009, that sent Justin Pogge to Anaheim in exchange for this pick (being conditional at the time of the trade). The condition – Pogge starts less than 30 regular-season games for Anaheim, or another NHL team he is traded to by Anaheim, between the 2009–10 and 2010–11 seasons – was converted on February 5, 2011, when Carolina played their 52nd game of the 2010–11 season without using Pogge in one of them (as Pogge had not started a game for any NHL team during the 2009–10 season).

=== Round seven ===
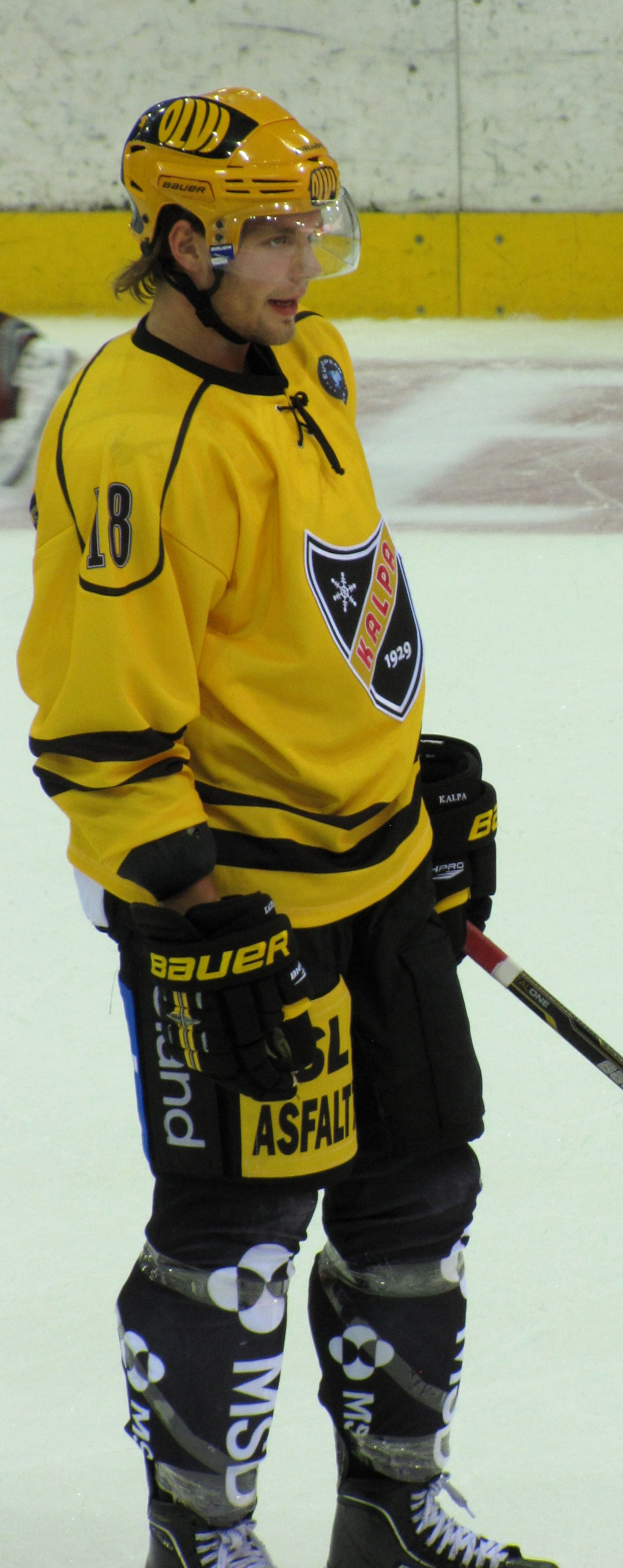
Iiro Pakarinen was selected 184th overall by the Florida Panthers.

#	Player	Nationality	NHL team	College/junior/club team
182	Frans Tuohimaa (G)	Finland	Edmonton Oilers	Jokerit Jr. (Finland Jr.)
183	Dillon Donnelly (D)	United States	Colorado Avalanche	Shawinigan Cataractes (QMJHL)
184	Iiro Pakarinen (RW)	Finland	Florida Panthers	KalPa (SM-liiga)
185	Mitchell Theoret (C)	Canada	New York Islanders	Niagara IceDogs (OHL)
186	Jordan Fransoo (D)	Canada	Ottawa Senators	Brandon Wheat Kings (WHL)
187	Aaron Harstad (D)	United States	Winnipeg Jets	Green Bay Gamblers (USHL)
188	Anton Forsberg (G)	Sweden	Columbus Blue Jackets	Modo Hockey Jr. (Sweden Jrs.)
189	Patrick Daly (D)	United States	New Jersey Devils	Benilde-St. Margaret's School (USHS–MN)
190	Garret Sparks (G)	United States	Toronto Maple Leafs	Guelph Storm (OHL)
191	Tyler Graovac (C)	Canada	Minnesota Wild	Ottawa 67's (OHL)
192	Teemu Eronen (D)	Finland	St. Louis Blues	Jokerit (SM-liiga)
193	Brody Sutter (C)	Canada	Carolina Hurricanes	Lethbridge Hurricanes (WHL)
194	Colin Blackwell (C)	United States	San Jose Sharks (from Calgary via Winnipeg)^{1}	St. John's Prep (USHS–MA)
195	Jyrki Jokipakka (D)	Finland	Dallas Stars	Ilves (SM-liiga)
196	Zac Larraza (LW)	United States	Phoenix Coyotes (from NY Rangers)^{2}	US NTDP (USHL)
197	Brad Navin (C)	United States	Buffalo Sabres	Waupaca High School (USHS–WI)
198	Colin Sullivan (D)	United States	Montreal Canadiens	Avon Old Farms (USHS–CT)
199	Alex Broadhurst (C)	United States	Chicago Blackhawks	Green Bay Gamblers (USHL)
200	Michael Schumacher (LW)	Sweden	Los Angeles Kings	Frolunda HC Jr. (Sweden Jrs.)
201	Matthew Peca (C)	Canada	Tampa Bay Lightning (from Phoenix)^{3}	Pembroke Lumber Kings (CCHL)
202	Brent Andrews (LW)	Canada	Nashville Predators	Halifax Mooseheads (QMJHL)
203	Max Everson (D)	United States	Toronto Maple Leafs (from Anaheim)^{4}	Edina High School (USHS–MN)
204	Ryan Dzingel (C)	United States	Ottawa Senators (from Pittsburgh)^{5}	Lincoln Stars (USHL)
205	Alexei Marchenko (D)	Russia	Detroit Red Wings	CSKA Moscow (KHL)
206	Derek Mathers (RW)	Canada	Philadelphia Flyers	Peterborough Petes (OHL)
207	Garrett Haar (D)	United States	Washington Capitals	Fargo Force (USHL)
208	Ondrej Palat (LW)	Czech Republic	Tampa Bay Lightning	Drummondville Voltigeurs (QMJHL)
209	Scott Wilson (C)	Canada	Pittsburgh Penguins (from San Jose)^{6}	Georgetown Raiders (OJHL)
210	Henrik Tommernes (D)	Sweden	Vancouver Canucks	Frolunda HC (SEL)
211	Johan Mattsson (G)	Sweden	Chicago Blackhawks (from Boston)^{7}	Sodertalje SK Jr. (Sweden Jrs.)

Notes

1. The Calgary Flames' seventh-round pick went to the San Jose Sharks as the result of a trade on June 25, 2011, that sent San Jose's fourth-round pick in 2011 (119th overall) to the Winnipeg in exchange for Carolina's fifth-round pick in 2011 (133rd overall) and this pick.
  Winnipeg previously acquired the pick as the result of a trade on February 28, 2011, that sent Fredrik Modin from the Atlanta Thrashers to Calgary in exchange for this pick.
2. The New York Rangers' seventh-round pick went to the Phoenix Coyotes as the result of a March 3, 2010, trade that sent Anders Eriksson to the Rangers in exchange for Miika Wiikman and this pick.
3. The Phoenix Coyotes' seventh-round pick went to the Tampa Bay Lightning as the result of a trade on June 25, 2011, that sent Marc-Antoine Pouliot to Phoenix in exchange for this pick.
4. The Anaheim Ducks' seventh-round pick went to the Toronto Maple Leafs as the result of a March 3, 2010, trade that sent Joey MacDonald to the Ducks in exchange for this pick.
5. The Pittsburgh Penguins' seventh-round pick went to the Ottawa Senators as the result of a February 24, 2011, trade that sent Alexei Kovalev to the Penguins in exchange for this pick (being conditional at the time of the trade). The condition – Pittsburgh does not advance to the 2011 Eastern Conference semifinals – was converted on April 27, 2011.
6. The San Jose Sharks' seventh-round pick went to the Pittsburgh Penguins as the result of a trade on June 26, 2010, that sent Pittsburgh's seventh-round pick in 2010 to San Jose in exchange for this pick.
7. The Boston Bruins' seventh-round pick went to the Chicago Blackhawks as the result of a trade on June 26, 2010, that sent Chicago's seventh-round pick in 2010 to Boston in exchange for this pick.

== Draftees based on nationality ==
Rank	Country	Picks	Percent	Top selection
	North America	142	67.6%	
1	Canada	82	39.1%	Ryan Nugent-Hopkins, 1st
2	United States	60	28.5%	J.T. Miller, 15th
	Europe	68	32.4%	
3	Sweden	28	13.3%	Gabriel Landeskog, 2nd
4	Czech Republic	10	4.8%	David Musil, 31st
4	Finland	10	4.8%	Joel Armia, 16th
6	Russia	9	4.3%	Vladislav Namestnikov, 27th
7	Slovakia	4	1.9%	Tomas Jurco, 35th
8	Germany	2	1.0%	Tobias Rieder, 114th
8	Norway	2	1.0%	Steffen Soberg, 117th
8	Switzerland	2	1.0%	Sven Baertschi, 13th
11	Denmark	1	0.5%	Nicklas Jensen, 29th

== North American draftees by state/province ==
Rank	State/Province	Selections	Top selection
1	Ontario	36	Ryan Strome, 5th
2	Alberta	15	Duncan Siemens, 11th
3	Minnesota	13	Mario Lucia, 60th
4	Quebec	12	Jonathan Huberdeau, 3rd
5	British Columbia	7	Ryan Nugent-Hopkins, 1st
6	Illinois	6	T. J. Tynan, 66th
7	California	5	Rocco Grimaldi, 33rd
7	New York	5	Tyler Biggs, 22nd
7	Pennsylvania	5	John Gibson, 39th
7	Saskatchewan	5	Harrison Ruopp, 84th
11	Ohio	4	J. T. Miller, 15th
12	New Brunswick	3	Sean Couturier, 8th
12	Texas	3	Stefan Noesen, 21st
12	Manitoba	3	Joel Edmundson, 46th
12	Connecticut	3	Michael Paliotta, 70th
12	Michigan	3	Reid Boucher, 99th
12	Wisconsin	3	Max McCormick, 171st
18	Colorado	2	Nick Shore, 82nd
18	Massachusetts	2	Garrett Noonan, 112th
18	Florida	2	Colin Suellentrop, 116th
21	Missouri	1	Scott Mayfield, 34th
21	Nova Scotia	1	Logan Shaw, 76th
21	New Jersey	1	Johnny Gaudreau, 104th
21	Arizona	1	Zac Larraza, 196th
21	Prince Edward Island	1	Brent Andrews, 202nd

== See also ==
- List of NHL first overall draft choices
