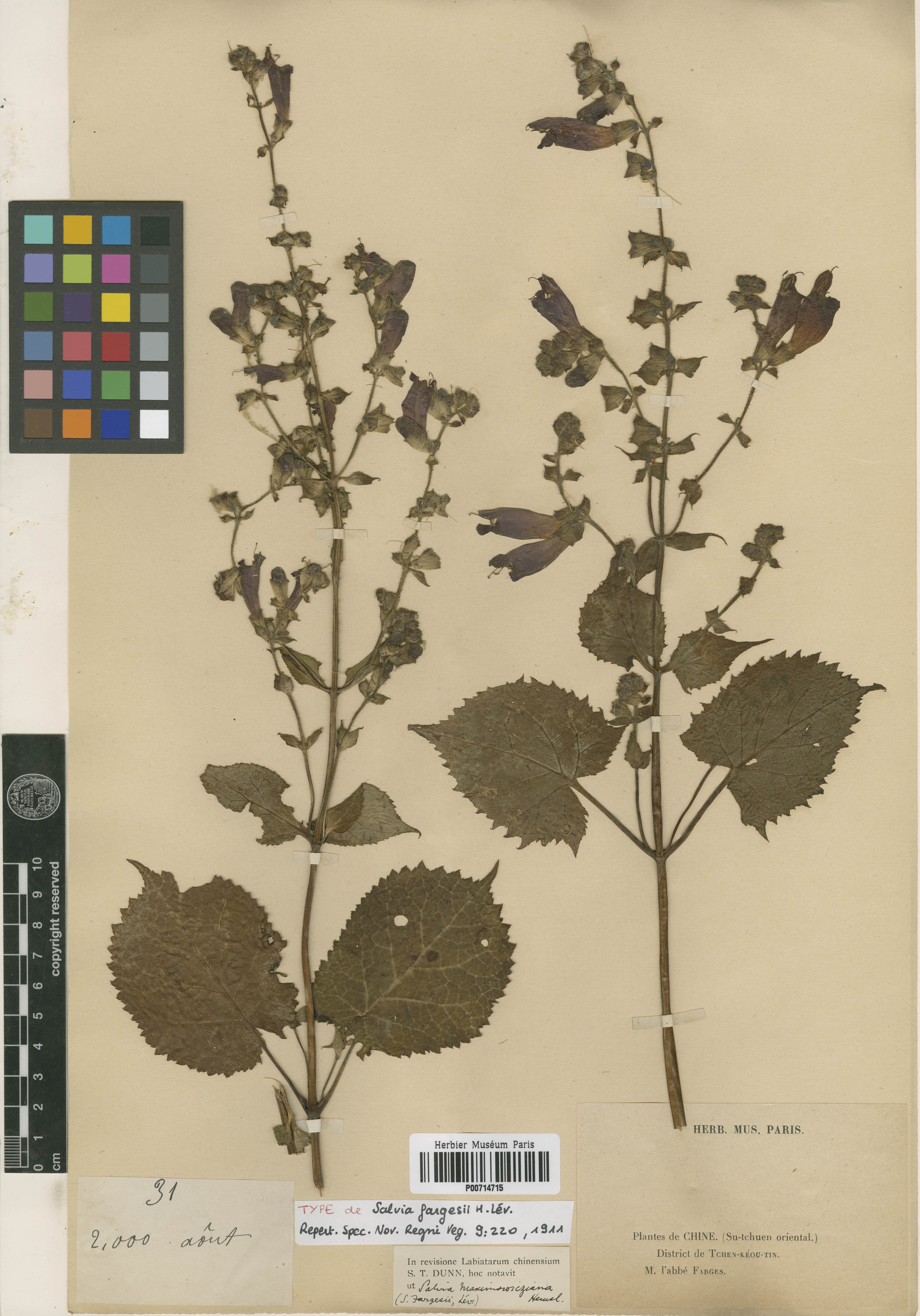

Conservation status
- Least Concern (IUCN 3.1)

Scientific classification
- Kingdom: Plantae
- Clade: Tracheophytes
- Clade: Angiosperms
- Clade: Eudicots
- Clade: Asterids
- Order: Lamiales
- Family: Lamiaceae
- Genus: Salvia
- Species: S. maximowicziana

Binomial name
- Salvia maximowicziana Hemsl.

Varieties
- S. maximowicziana var. maximowicziana; S. maximowicziana var. floribunda E.Peter

= Salvia maximowicziana =

Species of flowering plant

Salvia maximowicziana is a perennial plant in the family Lamiaceae. It is found growing on grasslands, forests, and forest edges in China, at 1,800 to 3,300 m (5,900 to 10,800 ft) elevation. It grows 10 to 90 cm (3.9 to 35.4 in) tall, with circular-cordate to ovate-cordate leaves that are typically 3 to 8 cm (1.2 to 3.1 in) long and 6 to 8 cm (2.4 to 3.1 in) wide. The upper leaf surface is nearly smooth, or lightly covered with hairs, while the underside has glandular hairs on the veins.

The inflorescence is of loose racemes or panicles, with a 2.2 cm (0.87 in) corolla. Salvia maximowicziana var. maximowicziana has a yellow corolla, while Salvia maximowicziana var. floribunda has a purple corolla.
