= 2013 World Junior Ice Hockey Championships rosters =

== Group A ==
=== Czech Republic ===
- Head coach: (Czech Republic) Miroslav Přerost

Pos.	No.	Player	Team	NHL Rights
GK	1	Patrik Bartošák	(Canada) Red Deer Rebels
GK	2	Jan Lukáš	(Czech Republic) HC Olomouc
GK	30	Matěj Machovský	(Canada) Brampton Battalion
D	4	Patrik Urbanec	(Czech Republic) PSG Zlín
D	6	David Musil	(Canada) Edmonton Oil Kings	Edmonton Oilers
D	8	Štěpán Jeník	(Finland) Oulun Kärpät (U20)
D	11	Petr Šidlík	(Canada) Victoriaville Tigres
D	12	Tomáš Pavelka	(Canada) P.E.I. Rocket
D	13	Marek Hrbas	(Canada) Kamloops Blazers
D	17	Jan Štencel	(Czech Republic) HC Vítkovice Steel
F	5	Martin Frk	(Canada) Halifax Mooseheads	Detroit Red Wings
F	10	Petr Koblasa	(Czech Republic) HC Energie Karlovy Vary
F	15	Jakub Vrána	(Sweden) Linköpings HC (U20)
F	16	Radek Faksa	(Canada) Kitchener Rangers	Dallas Stars
F	18	Vojtěch Tomeček	(Czech Republic) Energie Karlovy Vary (MHL)
F	19	Tomáš Hertl	(Czech Republic) HC Slavia Praha	San Jose Sharks
F	20	Dmitrij Jaškin	(Canada) Moncton Wildcats	St. Louis Blues
F	21	Matěj Beran	(Canada) P.E.I. Rocket
F	24	Petr Beránek	(Czech Republic) Orli Znojmo
F	25	Erik Němec	(Czech Republic) HC Vítkovice Steel (U20)
F	27	Tomáš Hyka	(Canada) Gatineau Olympiques	Los Angeles Kings
F	28	Michal Švihálek	(Czech Republic) HC České Budějovice
F	29	Lukáš Sedlák	(Canada) Chicoutimi Saguenéens	Columbus Blue Jackets

=== Finland ===
- Head coach: (Finland) Harri Rindell

Pos.	No.	Player	Team	NHL Rights
GK	1	Eetu Laurikainen	(Canada) Swift Current Broncos
GK	30	Joonas Korpisalo	(Finland) Jokerit	Columbus Blue Jackets
GK	31	Janne Juvonen	(Finland) Pelicans
D	2	Olli Määttä	(Canada) London Knights	Pittsburgh Penguins
D	3	Juuso Riikola	(Finland) KalPa
D	4	Petteri Lindbohm	(Finland) Jokerit	St. Louis Blues
D	5	Rasmus Ristolainen	(Finland) TPS
D	8	Henri Auvinen	(Finland) JYP-Akatemia
D	12	Ville Pokka	(Finland) Kärpät	New York Islanders
D	27	Juuso Vainio	(Finland) HPK
F	10	Joel Armia	(Finland) Ässät	Buffalo Sabres
F	11	Markus Granlund	(Finland) HIFK	Calgary Flames
F	13	Markus Hännikäinen	(Finland) Jokerit
F	15	Miro Aaltonen	(Finland) Blues
F	16	Aleksander Barkov	(Finland) Tappara
F	19	Ville Järveläinen	(Finland) Peliitat Heinola
F	20	Teuvo Teräväinen	(Finland) Jokerit	Chicago Blackhawks
F	21	Thomas Nykopp	(Finland) HIFK
F	22	Miikka Salomäki	(Finland) Kärpät	Nashville Predators
F	23	Saku Salminen	(Finland) Jokerit
F	24	Matti Lamberg	(Finland) Jokerit
F	26	Robert Leino	(Finland) HPK
F	28	Artturi Lehkonen	(Finland) KalPa

=== Latvia ===
- Head coach: (Latvia) Leonids Tambijevs

Pos.	No.	Player	Team	NHL Rights
GK	1	Vadims Miščuks	(Latvia) HK Liepājas Metalurgs
GK	25	Ivars Punnenovs	(Switzerland) Rapperswil-Jona Lakers (U20)
GK	30	Elvis Merzļikins	(Switzerland) HC Lugano (U20)
D	2	Kristaps Nīmanis	(Finland) Red Ducks Vaasa (Fin-3)
D	4	Edgars Siksna	(Latvia) HK Liepājas Metalurgs
D	5	Rinalds Rosinskis	(Canada) Prince George Cougars
D	7	Pauls Zvirbulis	(Latvia) HK Rīga
D	8	Edmunds Augstkalns	(Latvia) HK Rīga
D	14	Patriks Škuratovs	(Latvia) HK Rīga
D	18	Kriss Lipsbergs	(Latvia) HK Rīga
F	10	Rihards Bukarts	(Latvia) HK Rīga
F	11	Roberts Lipsbergs	(United States) Seattle Thunderbirds
F	12	Artūrs Kuzmenkovs	(Latvia) HK Liepājas Metalurgs
F	13	Edgars Kulda	(Canada) Edmonton Oil Kings
F	15	Andris Siksnis	(Latvia) HK Rīga
F	16	Kārlis Ozoliņš	(Latvia) HK Liepājas Metalurgs
F	17	Nikolajs Jeļisejevs	(Latvia) HK Rīga
F	19	Artūrs Ševčenko	(Latvia) HK Rīga
F	21	Teodors Bļugers	(United States) Minnesota State Mavericks	Pittsburgh Penguins
F	23	Toms Andersons	(Switzerland) SC Bern (U20)
F	26	Edgars Kurmis	(Latvia) HK Rīga
F	28	Ņikita Jevpalovs	(Canada) Blainville-Boisbriand Armada
F	29	Lauris Rancevs	(Latvia) HK Rīga

=== Sweden ===
- Head coach: (Sweden) Roger Rönnberg

Pos.	No.	Player	Team	NHL Rights
GK	1	Joel Lassinantti	(Sweden) Luleå HF (U20)
GK	30	Niklas Lundström	(Sweden) AIK IF	St. Louis Blues
GK	35	Oscar Dansk	(United States) Erie Otters	Columbus Blue Jackets
D	4	Christian Djoos	(Sweden) Brynäs IF	Washington Capitals
D	5	Rasmus Bengtsson	(United States) Muskegon Lumberjacks	Florida Panthers
D	6	Emil Djuse	(Sweden) Södertälje SK
D	7	Tom Nilsson	(Sweden) Mora IK	Toronto Maple Leafs
D	8	Linus Arnesson	(Sweden) Djurgårdens IF Hockey
D	9	Mikael Vikstrand	(Sweden) Mora IK	Ottawa Senators
D	14	Robert Hägg	(Sweden) Modo Hockey (U20)
F	10	Alexander Wennberg	(Sweden) Djurgårdens IF Hockey
F	11	Jeremy Boyce-Rotevall	(Sweden) Timrå IK
F	13	Viktor Arvidsson	(Sweden) Skellefteå AIK
F	15	Sebastian Collberg	(Sweden) Frölunda HC	Montreal Canadiens
F	16	Filip Forsberg	(Sweden) Leksands IF	Washington Capitals
F	17	William Karlsson	(Sweden) HV71	Anaheim Ducks
F	19	Elias Lindholm	(Sweden) Brynäs IF
F	23	Victor Rask	(Canada) Calgary Hitmen	Carolina Hurricanes
F	24	Rickard Rakell	(United States) Plymouth Whalers	Anaheim Ducks
F	25	Jacob de la Rose	(Sweden) Leksands IF	Montreal Canadiens
F	26	Nick Sörensen	(Canada) Quebec Remparts
F	27	Filip Sandberg	(Sweden) HV71
F	29	Emil Molin	(Sweden) Brynäs IF	Dallas Stars

=== Switzerland ===
- Head coach: (Canada) Sean Simpson

Pos.	No.	Player	Team	NHL Rights
GK	1	Melvin Nyffeler	(Switzerland) GCK Lions
GK	20	Luca Boltshauser	(Sweden) Färjestad BK
GK	30	Robin Kuonen	(Switzerland) EV Zug
D	2	Cédric Hächler	(Switzerland) GCK Lions
D	4	Phil Baltisberger	(Switzerland) GCK Lions
D	5	Mirco Müller	(United States) Everett Silvertips
D	8	Christian Marti	(Canada) Blainville-Boisbriand Armada
D	14	Dean Kukan	(Sweden) Tingsryds AIF
D	27	Samuel Guerra	(Switzerland) HC Davos
D	29	Eliot Antonietti	(Switzerland) Genève-Servette HC
F	9	Tanner Richard	(Canada) Guelph Storm	Tampa Bay Lightning
F	10	Alessio Bertaggia	(Canada) Brandon Wheat Kings
F	11	Christoph Bertschy	(Switzerland) SC Bern	Minnesota Wild
F	12	Lino Martschini	(Switzerland) EV Zug
F	15	Mike Künzle	(Switzerland) GCK Lions
F	16	Sandro Zangger	(Switzerland) GCK Lions
F	19	Robin Leone	(Switzerland) Kloten Flyers
F	21	Jan Neuenschwander	(Switzerland) HC Davos
F	22	Sven Andrighetto	(Canada) Rouyn-Noranda Huskies
F	23	Martin Ness	(Switzerland) GCK Lions
F	24	Lukas Sieber	(Switzerland) HC Davos
F	25	Dario Simion	(Switzerland) HC Lugano
F	28	Lukas Balmelli	(Canada) Drummondville Voltigeurs

== Group B ==
=== Canada ===
- Head coach: (Canada) Steve Spott

Pos.	No.	Player	Team	NHL Rights
GK	1	Jake Paterson	(United States) Saginaw Spirit	Detroit Red Wings
GK	30	Malcolm Subban	(Canada) Belleville Bulls	Boston Bruins
GK	31	Jordan Binnington	(Canada) Owen Sound Attack	St. Louis Blues
D	4	Morgan Rielly	(Canada) Moose Jaw Warriors	Toronto Maple Leafs
D	6	Scott Harrington	(Canada) London Knights	Pittsburgh Penguins
D	14	Ryan Murphy	(Canada) Kitchener Rangers	Carolina Hurricanes
D	16	Xavier Ouellet	(Canada) Blainville-Boisbriand Armada	Detroit Red Wings
D	26	Tyler Wotherspoon	(United States) Portland Winterhawks	Calgary Flames
D	27	Dougie Hamilton	(Canada) Niagara IceDogs	Boston Bruins
D	28	Griffin Reinhart	(Canada) Edmonton Oil Kings	New York Islanders
F	8	Ty Rattie	(United States) Portland Winterhawks	St. Louis Blues
F	9	Ryan Nugent-Hopkins	(United States) Oklahoma City Barons	Edmonton Oilers
F	11	Jonathan Huberdeau	(Canada) Saint John Sea Dogs	Florida Panthers
F	15	Anthony Camara	(Canada) Barrie Colts	Boston Bruins
F	17	JC Lipon	(Canada) Kamloops Blazers
F	18	Ryan Strome	(Canada) Niagara IceDogs	New York Islanders
F	19	Mark Scheifele	(Canada) Barrie Colts	Winnipeg Jets
F	20	Brett Ritchie	(Canada) Niagara IceDogs	Dallas Stars
F	21	Phillip Danault	(Canada) Victoriaville Tigres	Chicago Blackhawks
F	22	Boone Jenner	(Canada) Oshawa Generals	Columbus Blue Jackets
F	23	Nathan MacKinnon	(Canada) Halifax Mooseheads
F	24	Mark McNeill	(Canada) Prince Albert Raiders	Chicago Blackhawks
F	29	Jonathan Drouin	(Canada) Halifax Mooseheads

=== Germany ===
- Head coach: (Germany) Ernst Höfner

Pos.	No.	Player	Team	NHL Rights
GK	1	Marvin Cüpper	(Canada) Shawinigan Cataractes
GK	29	Philip Lehr	(Germany) FASS Berlin (Ger-3)
GK	30	Elmar Trautmann	(Germany) ERV Chemnitz 07 (Ger-3)
D	2	Oliver Mebus	(Germany) Füchse Duisburg
D	4	Henry Haase	(Germany) Eisbären Berlin
D	6	Maximilian Faber	(Germany) Eisbären Berlin
D	7	Max Meirandres	(Germany) Starbulls Rosenheim
D	8	Stephan Kronthaler	(Germany) Landshut Cannibals
D	10	Steven Bär	(Germany) Löwen Frankfurt (Ger-3)
D	16	Florin Ketterer	(Germany) EC Bad Tölz
D	27	Kilian Keller	(Germany) EHC Wolfsburg
F	5	Christian Kretschmann	(Germany) Krefeld Pinguine
F	9	Huba Sekesi	(United States) Jamestown Ironmen
F	11	Leonhard Pföderl	(Germany) EC Bad Tölz
F	14	Nickolas Latta	(Canada) Sarnia Sting
F	15	Leon Draisaitl	(Canada) Prince Albert Raiders
F	17	Andreas Pauli	(Germany) EHC Red Bull München
F	20	Dennis Reimer	(Germany) Hannover Indians
F	21	Dominik Kahun	(Canada) Sudbury Wolves
F	22	Tobias Rieder	(Canada) Kitchener Rangers	Edmonton Oilers
F	23	Frederik Tiffels	(United States) Muskegon Lumberjacks
F	24	Sebastian Uvira	(Canada) Oshawa Generals
F	25	Alexander Ackermann	(Germany) Heilbronner Falken

=== Russia ===
- Head coach: (Russia) Mikhail Varnakov

Pos.	No.	Player	Team	NHL Rights
GK	1	Igor Ustinsky	(Russia) Stalnye Lisy (MHL)
GK	20	Andrei Makarov	(Canada) Saskatoon Blades	Buffalo Sabres
GK	30	Andrei Vasilevski	(Russia) Tolpar Ufa (MHL)	Tampa Bay Lightning
D	5	Albert Yarullin	(Russia) Ak Bars Kazan
D	7	Artyom Sergeyev	(Canada) Val-d'Or Foreurs
D	9	Nikita Nesterov	(Russia) Traktor Chelyabinsk	Tampa Bay Lightning
D	22	Andrei Mironov	(Russia) Dynamo Moscow
D	27	Kirill Dyakov	(Russia) HC Yugra
D	28	Yaroslav Dyblenko	(Russia) Mytischi Atlanti (MHL)
D	29	Pavel Koledov	(Russia) Loko Yaroslavl (MHL)
F	8	Maxim Shalunov	(Russia) Traktor Chelyabinsk	Chicago Blackhawks
F	10	Nail Yakupov	(Russia) Neftekhimik Nizhnekamsk	Edmonton Oilers
F	11	Evgeni Mozer	(Russia) Avangard Omsk
F	12	Andrei Sigarev	(Russia) SKA Saint Petersburg
F	14	Vladimir Tkachev	(Russia) Ak Bars Kazan
F	15	Valeri Nichushkin	(Russia) Chelmet
F	16	Nikita Kucherov	(Canada) Rouyn-Noranda Huskies	Tampa Bay Lightning
F	17	Anton Slepyshev	(Russia) Metallurg Novokuznetsk
F	18	Yaroslav Kosov	(Russia) Metallurg Magnitogorsk	Florida Panthers
F	19	Alexander Khokhlachev	(Russia) Spartak Moscow	Boston Bruins
F	21	Kirill Kapustin	(Russia) Loko Yaroslavl (MHL)
F	25	Mikhail Grigorenko	(Canada) Quebec Remparts	Buffalo Sabres
F	26	Daniil Zharkov	(Canada) Belleville Bulls	Edmonton Oilers

=== Slovakia ===
- Head coach: (Slovakia) Ernest Bokroš

Pos.	No.	Player	Team	NHL Rights
GK	1	Richard Sabol	(United States) Green Bay Gamblers
GK	2	Adam Nagy	(Slovakia) HK Orange 20
GK	30	Patrik Romančík	(Slovakia) HK Orange 20
D	5	Dávid Bajaník	(Hungary) Patriot Budapest
D	6	Tomáš Rusina	(Slovakia) HK Orange 20
D	11	Peter Čerešňák	(Canada) Peterborough Petes	New York Rangers
D	12	Emil Bagin	(Slovakia) HK Dukla Trenčín
D	16	Patrik Luža	(Slovakia) HK Orange 20
D	21	Tomáš Nechala	(Slovakia) HK Orange 20
D	24	Richard Buri	(Slovakia) HK Orange 20
D	28	Karol Korím	(Slovakia) HK Orange 20
F	9	Milan Kolena	(Slovakia) HK Orange 20
F	10	Denis Hudec	(Slovakia) HK Orange 20
F	13	Tomáš Mikúš	(Slovakia) HC Slovan Bratislava
F	14	Richard Mráz	(Slovakia) HK Orange 20
F	17	Michal Uhrík	(Slovakia) HK Orange 20
F	18	Andrej Bíreš	(Slovakia) HK Orange 20
F	19	Marko Daňo	(Slovakia) HC Slovan Bratislava
F	20	Martin Réway	(Canada) Gatineau Olympiques
F	25	Bruno Mráz	(Slovakia) HK Orange 20
F	26	Branislav Rapáč	(Slovakia) HK Orange 20
F	27	Dominik Fujerík	(Slovakia) HK Orange 20
F	29	Matúš Matis	(Slovakia) HK Orange 20

=== United States ===
- Head coach: (United States) Phil Housley

Pos.	No.	Player	Team	NHL Rights
GK	29	Garret Sparks	(Canada) Guelph Storm	Toronto Maple Leafs
GK	30	Jon Gillies	(United States) Providence College Friars	Calgary Flames
GK	35	John Gibson	(Canada) Kitchener Rangers	Anaheim Ducks
D	3	Seth Jones	(United States) Portland Winterhawks
D	5	Connor Murphy	(Canada) Sarnia Sting	Phoenix Coyotes
D	6	Mike Reilly	(United States) Minnesota Golden Gophers	Columbus Blue Jackets
D	8	Jacob Trouba	(United States) Michigan Wolverines	Winnipeg Jets
D	14	Shayne Gostisbehere	(United States) Union College Dutchmen	Philadelphia Flyers
D	19	Jake McCabe	(United States) Wisconsin Badgers	Buffalo Sabres
D	27	Pat Sieloff	(Canada) Windsor Spitfires	Calgary Flames
F	7	Sean Kuraly	(United States) Miami University RedHawks	San Jose Sharks
F	10	J. T. Miller	(United States) Connecticut Whale	New York Rangers
F	12	Mario Lucia	(United States) Notre Dame Fighting Irish	Minnesota Wild
F	13	Johnny Gaudreau	(United States) Boston College Eagles	Calgary Flames
F	15	Alex Galchenyuk	(Canada) Sarnia Sting	Montreal Canadiens
F	16	Riley Barber	(United States) Miami University RedHawks	Washington Capitals
F	18	Cole Bardreau	(United States) Cornell Big Red
F	20	Blake Pietila	(United States) Michigan Tech Huskies	New Jersey Devils
F	21	Ryan Hartman	(United States) Plymouth Whalers
F	22	Tyler Biggs	(Canada) Oshawa Generals	Toronto Maple Leafs
F	23	Rocco Grimaldi	(United States) North Dakota Fighting Sioux	Florida Panthers
F	25	Vincent Trocheck	(United States) Saginaw Spirit	Florida Panthers
F	26	Jimmy Vesey	(United States) Harvard Crimson	Nashville Predators
