= Henry Haase =

German ice hockey player

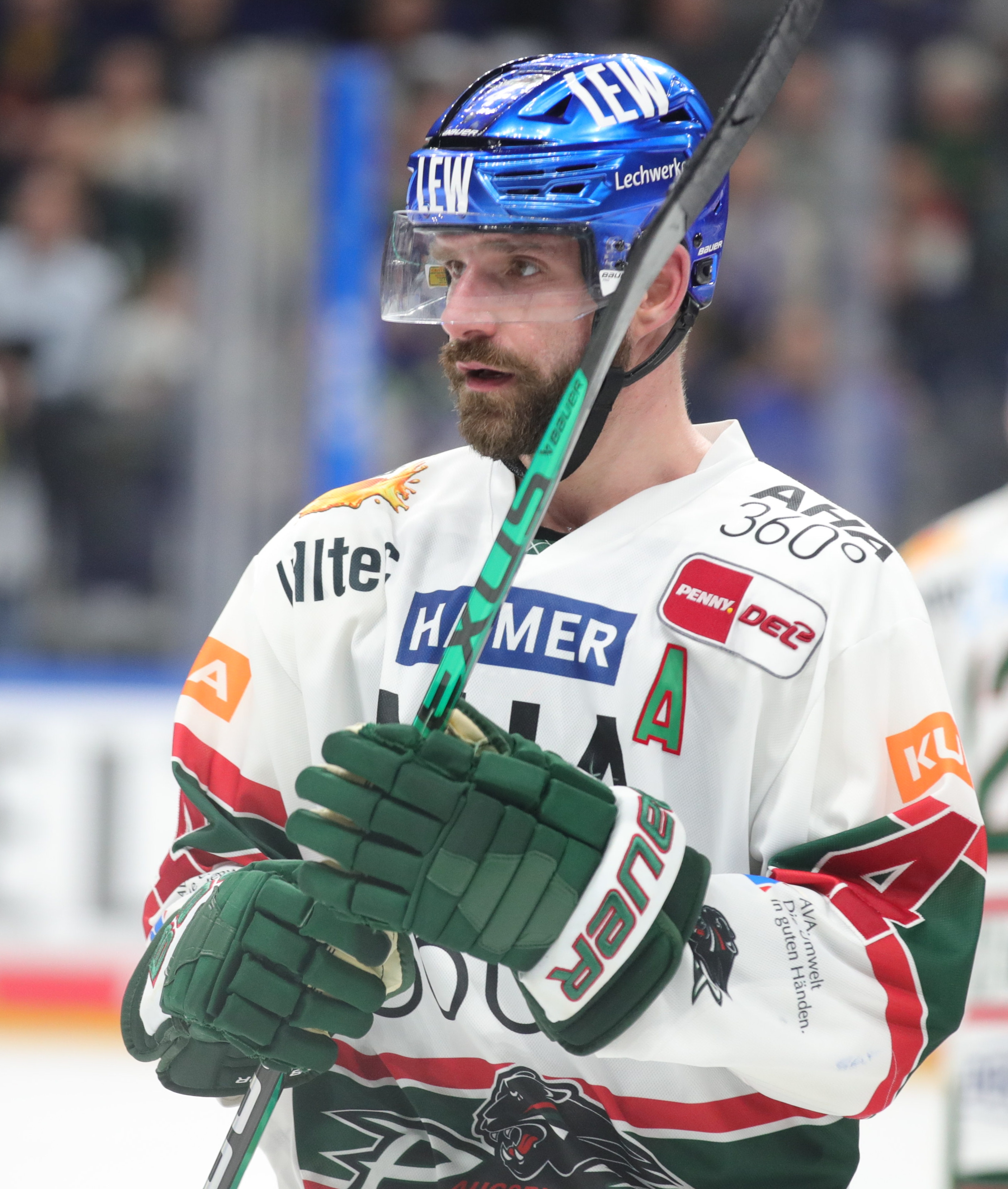
- Born: 25 June 1993 (age 32); Berlin, Germany
- Height: 6 ft 3 in (191 cm)
- Weight: 220 lb (100 kg; 15 st 10 lb)
- Position: Defence
- Shoots: Left
- Ger.4 team Former teams: FASS Berlin; Eisbären Berlin; Düsseldorfer EG; Augsburger Panther
- Playing career: 2011–present

Henry Haase (born 25 June 1993) is a German professional ice hockey defenceman, currently under contract with German side, FASS Berlin of the fourth tier German league, Regionalliga.

== Playing career ==
Haase came through the youth ranks of Eisbären Berlin and made his debut in Germany's top-flight Deutsche Eishockey Liga (DEL) during the 2011-12 season. In his second year, he won the German championship with the Eisbären squad.

After spending his entire playing career in Berlin, Haase was out of contract following the 2015–16 season and signed with fellow DEL side Düsseldorfer EG on 3 April 2016.

Haase played two seasons with Düsseldorfer EG before securing a one-year contract as a free agent with his third top flight DEL club, Augsburger Panther on 5 April 2018.
