= Eiswelt Stuttgart =

Multipurpose indoor arena in Stuttgart, Germany

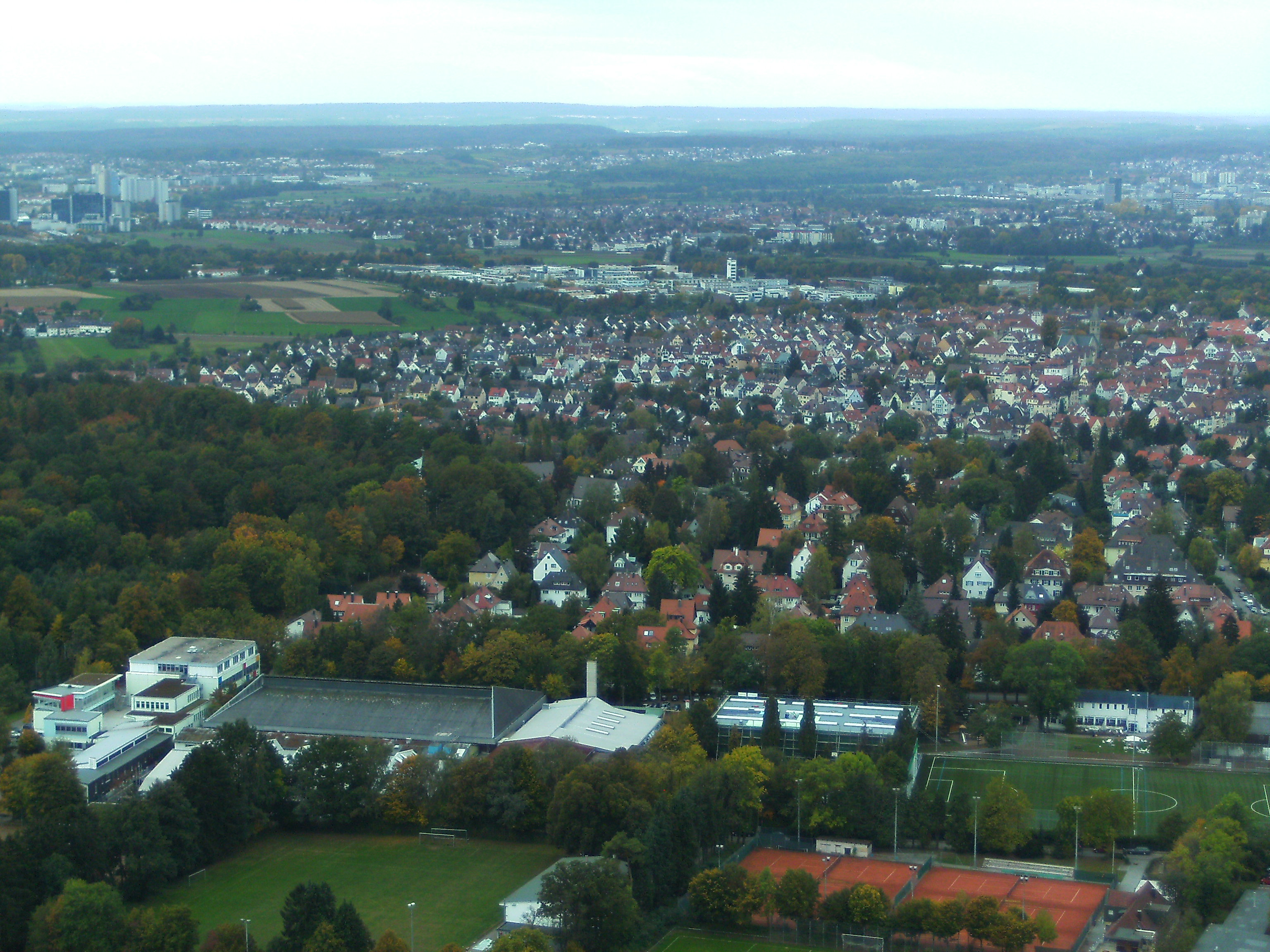
- The Waldau sports center with the Eiswelt Stuttgart in the foreground as seen from the Fernsehturm.
- Interactive map of Eiswelt Stuttgart
- Former names: Eissportzentrum Waldau (1961–2011)
- Location: Keßlerweg 8 Stuttgart, Germany
- Coordinates: 48.7511°N 9.1852°E
- Owner: City of Stuttgart
- Capacity: 3,000

Construction
- Opened: 1961

Tenant
- Stuttgart Rebels (1997–present)

Eiswelt Stuttgart is a multipurpose indoor arena in the Waldau neighborhood of Stuttgart, Germany. It is home to the Stuttgart Rebels ice hockey team of the Regionalliga Süd-West.

== History ==
The Eissportzentrum Waldau was built in 1961 by the TEC Waldau hockey club as an open-air rink and was taken over by the city of Stuttgart on December 6, 1962. It was roofed over in 1977 and extensively renovated in 2011. The arena has a capacity of 3,000 spectators since the renovation in 2011.

== Gallery ==
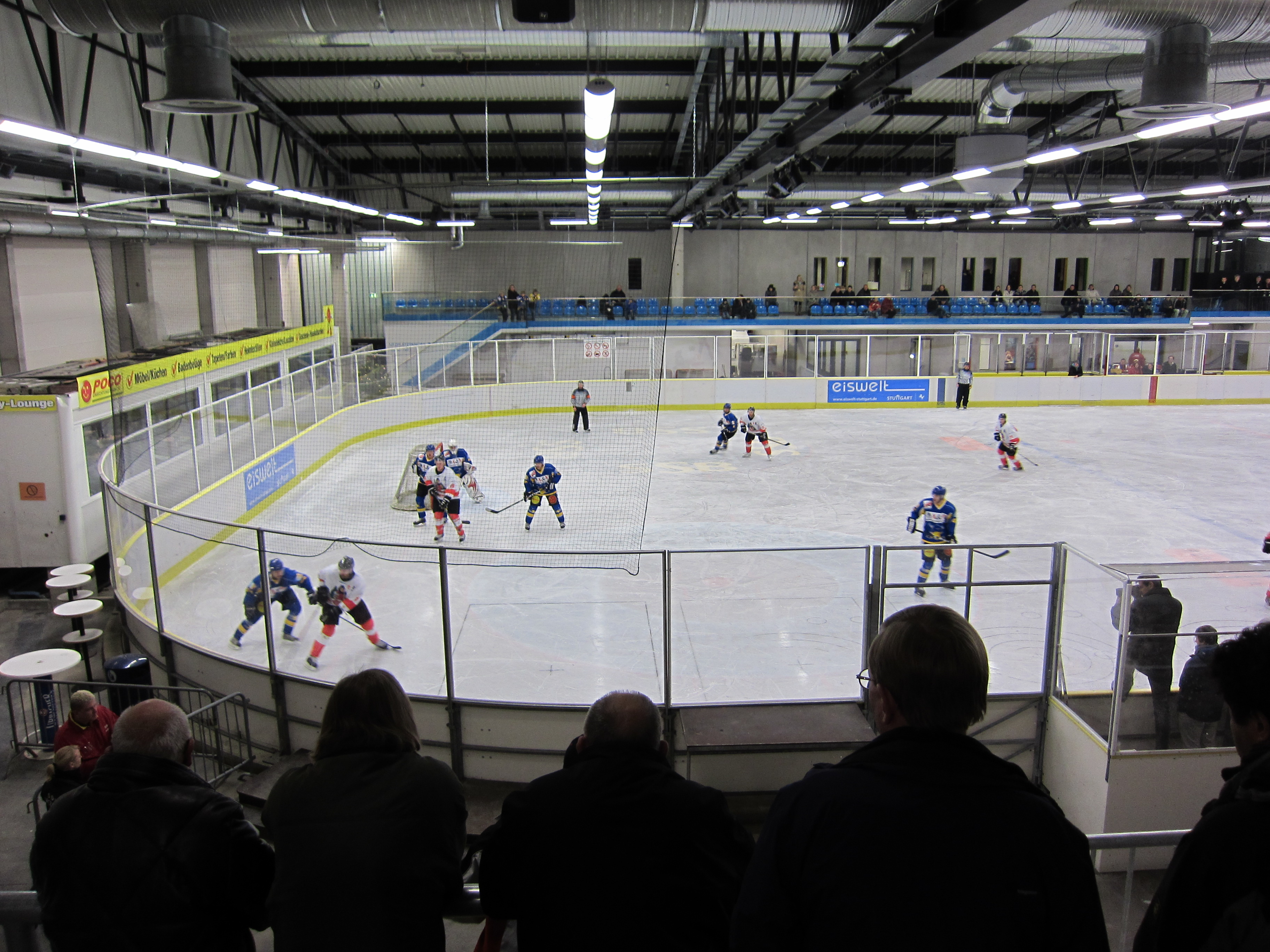

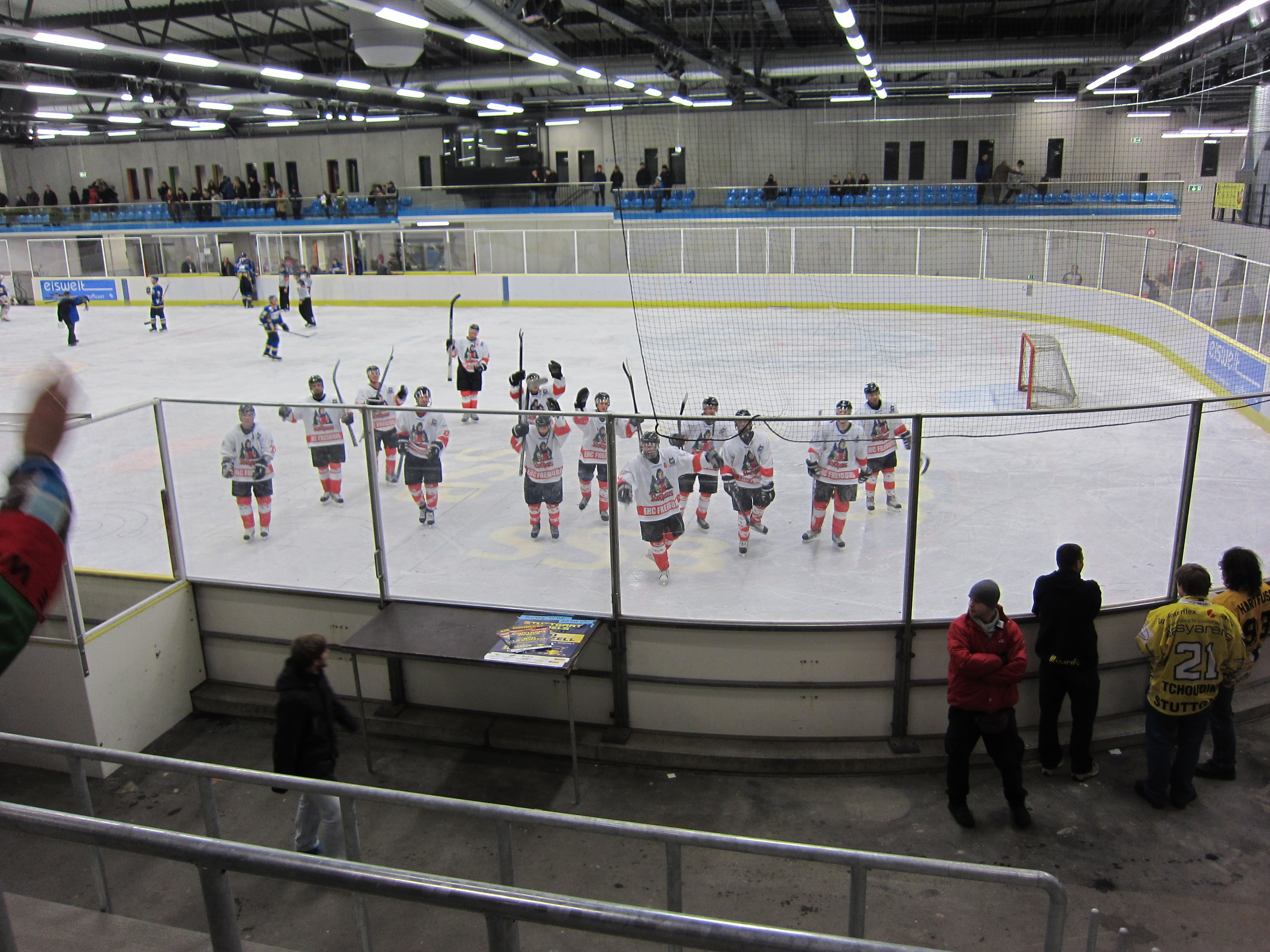
