= Stuttgart Rebels =

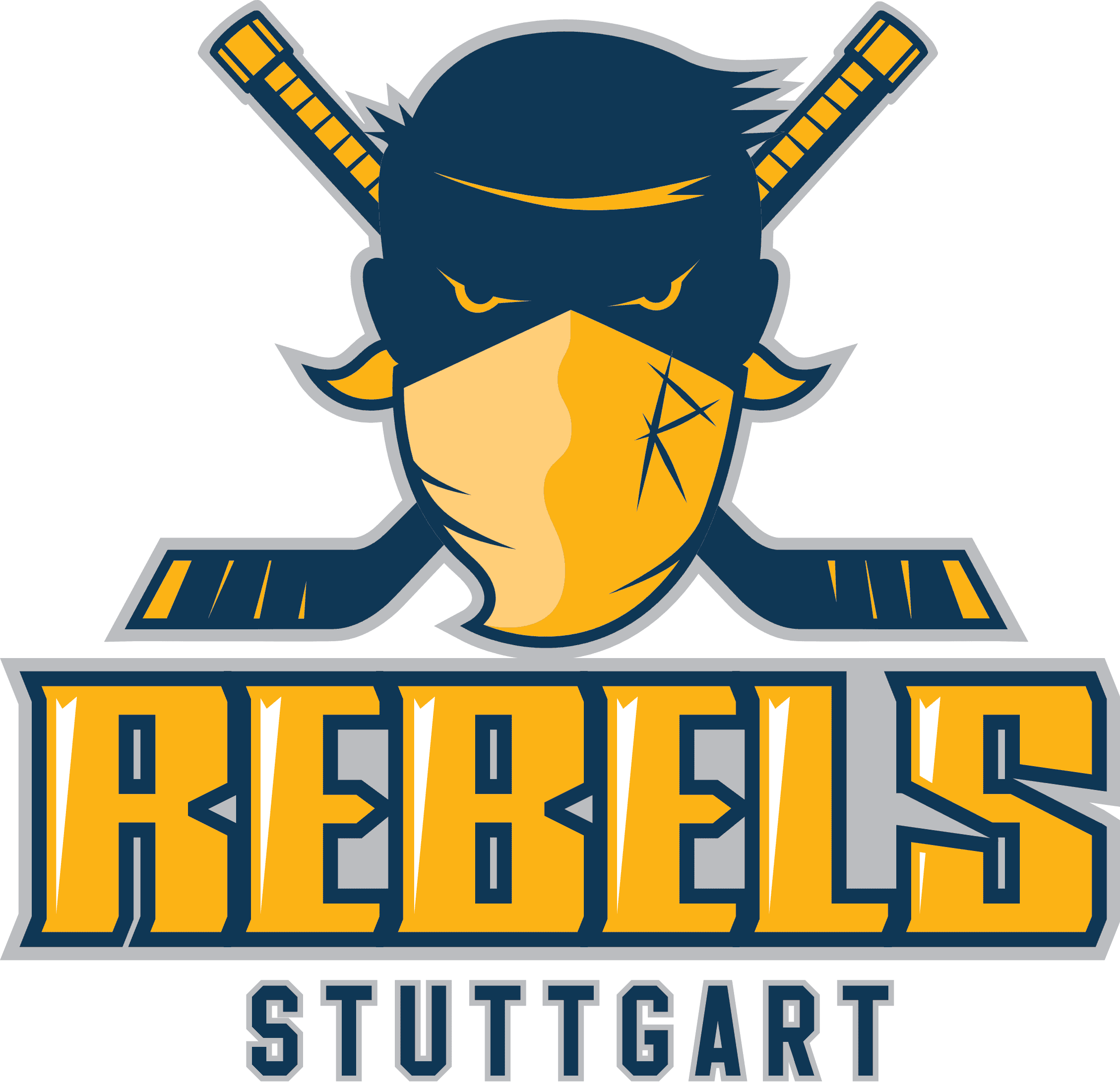
- City: Stuttgart, Germany
- League: Oberliga
- Division: South
- Founded: 1969 (2006)
- Home arena: Eiswelt Stuttgart (capacity: 1,974)
- Colors: Blue, Yellow
- Owners: Stuttgarter Eishockey Club e.V., Henning Elsässer
- CEO: (Germany) Alexander Fuchs
- General manager: (Canada) Matthew Pistilli
- Head coach: (Canada) Tom Coolen
- Website: rebels-stuttgart.com

Franchise history
- 1969-1984: EHC Stuttgart
- 1984-1991: EV Stuttgart
- 1991-1997: EC Stuttgart
- 1997–2000: Stuttgarter Eishockey-Club e.V.
- 2000–2006: Stuttgart Wizards
- 2006–present: Stuttgart Rebels

The Stuttgart Rebels are an ice hockey team based in Stuttgart, Germany. They play in the Oberliga, the third-highest level of ice hockey in Germany.

== Arena ==
The team plays at the 1,974-seat Eiswelt Stuttgart.

== History ==
Since 1998 Stuttgart Rebels have played in the fourth tier of hockey in Germany every season except from 2003 to 2006 when they played in the Oberliga, the third division. From 1998 to 2000 the team was known as the Stuttgarter Eishockey-Club e.V. From 2000 to 2006 the team used the name Stuttgart Wizards before rebranding to the current name of Stuttgart Rebels prior to the 2006–2007 season.

== Honours ==
Stuttgart Rebels have been champions of the Regionalliga Süd-West three times and 1-time champion of the Landesliga Baden-Württemberg.

- Regionalliga Süd-West Champions (3): 2006/07, 2009/10, 2010/11
- Landesliga Baden-Württemberg Champions (1): 2008/09
