= Yaroslav Dyblenko =

Russian ice hockey player

- Born: December 28, 1993 (age 32) Surgut, Russia
- Height: 6 ft 1 in (185 cm)
- Weight: 207 lb (94 kg; 14 st 11 lb)
- Position: Defence
- Shoots: Left
- KHL team Former teams: Torpedo Nizhny Novgorod; Atlant Moscow Oblast; Spartak Moscow; Binghamton Devils; SKA Saint Petersburg; HC Sochi; CSKA Moscow; Severstal Cherepovets; Amur Khabarovsk
- NHL draft: Undrafted
- Playing career: 2012–present

Yaroslav Dyblenko (born December 28, 1993) is a Russian professional ice hockey defenceman. He currently playing under contract with Torpedo Nizhny Novgorod of the Kontinental Hockey League (KHL).

== Playing career ==
Dyblenko made his Kontinental Hockey League (KHL) debut playing with Atlant Moscow Oblast during the 2012–13 KHL season before joining Spartak Moscow for the 2015–16 KHL season.

On April 20, 2017, Dyblenko signed a two-year, entry-level contract with the New Jersey Devils of the National Hockey League (NHL). Before the season, Dyblenko's KHL rights were traded from Spartak Moscow to perennial contenders SKA Saint Petersburg on August 18, 2017.

In the 2017–18 season, after attending New Jersey's training camp, Dyblenko was reassigned to American Hockey League affiliate, the Binghamton Devils for their inaugural year. While struggling to transition to the smaller ice, Dyblenko was relegated to a healthy scratch throughout the season and was unable to earn a recall to the NHL. He appeared in 54 games for just 8 points. In the off-season, Dyblenko's interest in returning to the KHL was confirmed as he was placed on unconditional waivers by the New Jersey Devils, in order to terminate the final year of his contract on May 9, 2018.

On May 18, 2018, Dyblenko initially agreed to terms with SKA Saint Petersburg on a four-year contract. However, with salary cap considerations and just three months later on August 16, 2018, Dyblenko was returned to former club, Spartak Moscow in a trade for financial compensation. Dyblenko played the 2018–19 season with Spartak Moscow before leaving in the off-season to return to SKA Saint Petersburg on a three-year contract on July 15, 2019.

Dyblenko went scoreless in 14 games to start the 2021–22 season, before he was traded by SKA to HC Sochi in exchange for financial compensation on 17 October 2021.

As a free agent from Sochi, Dyblenko agreed to a two-year contract with newly crowned champions, HC CSKA Moscow, on 4 May 2022.

After helping CSKA retain the Gagarin Cup, Dyblenko was traded before his agreed two-year extension came into effect following the 2023–24 season, to the Severstal Cherepovets in exchange for Nikita Sedov on 5 July 2024.

On 8 July 2025, after just one season with Severstal and limited to just 32 games through injury, Dyblenko was traded to Amur Khabarovsk in exchange for financial compensation.

== Personal life ==
On June 24, 2017, in Moscow, Yaroslav married his wife Daria Dyblenko.

In May 2023, in an interview, he stated that he had converted to Islam 6 years ago. He was brought to Islam by hockey player Albert Yarullin.

== Career statistics ==
=== Regular season and playoffs ===
			Regular season					Playoffs
Season	Team	League	GP	G	A	Pts	PIM	GP	G	A	Pts	PIM
2010–11	Mytischenskie Atlanty	MHL	12	0	1	1	6	6	0	0	0	4
2011–12	Kristall Elektrostal	RUS-3	4	0	0	0	10	—	—	—	—	—
2011–12	Mytischi Atlanty	MHL	59	1	10	11	28	12	2	2	4	31
2012–13	Mytischi Atlanty	MHL	39	7	12	19	28	8	1	5	6	12
2012–13	Atlant Moscow Oblast	KHL	11	1	2	3	8	5	0	0	0	2
2013–14	Mytischi Atlanty	MHL	1	0	1	1	0	—	—	—	—	—
2013–14	Atlant Moscow Oblast	KHL	38	2	4	6	14	—	—	—	—	—
2014–15	Atlant Moscow Oblast	KHL	29	3	9	12	32	—	—	—	—	—
2015–16	Spartak Moscow	KHL	51	2	5	7	45	—	—	—	—	—
2016–17	Spartak Moscow	KHL	51	4	7	11	51	—	—	—	—	—
2017–18	Binghamton Devils	AHL	54	2	6	8	50	—	—	—	—	—
2018–19	Spartak Moscow	KHL	55	5	5	10	66	6	0	2	2	8
2019–20	SKA Saint Petersburg	KHL	39	2	4	6	16	3	0	0	0	0
2020–21	SKA Saint Petersburg	KHL	27	1	4	5	10	6	0	1	1	0
2021–22	SKA Saint Petersburg	KHL	14	0	0	0	12	—	—	—	—	—
2021–22	HC Sochi	KHL	21	2	5	7	8	—	—	—	—	—
2022–23	CSKA Moscow	KHL	65	2	13	15	35	27	2	2	4	23
2023–24	CSKA Moscow	KHL	59	1	11	12	53	5	0	2	2	6
2024–25	Severstal Cherepovets	KHL	32	1	4	5	12	—	—	—	—	—
2025–26	Amur Khabarovsk	KHL	57	4	15	19	30	—	—	—	—	—
KHL totals			549	30	88	118	392	52	2	7	9	39

=== International ===
Year	Team	Event	Result	GP	G	A	Pts	PIM
2013	Russia	WJC	3rd place, bronze medalist(s)	7	0	0	0	0
Junior totals				7	0	0	0	0

== Awards and honours ==
Award	Year
MHL
Playoffs Best Plus/Minus (+11)	2012
KHL
Rookie of the Month (October)	2014
Defenseman of the Week (Sep. 14)	2015
Gagarin Cup (CSKA Moscow)	2023
