= Regionalliga (ice hockey) =

Fourth-tier men's ice hockey league in Germany

- Sport: Ice hockey
- Founded: 1961; 65 years ago
- Administrator: DEB
- No. of teams: 44
- Country: Germany
- Most recent champions: EC Harzer Falken (North); Herner EV (West); ESC Dresden 1b (East); EHC Eisbären Heilbronn (Southwest); EHC Bayreuth (Bayern)
- Level on pyramid: Level 4
- Promotion to: Oberliga
- Relegation to: Landesliga

The Regionalliga is the fourth level of ice hockey in Germany. It was founded in 1961 as the Gruppenliga, and was renamed the Regionalliga for the 1965–66 season. From 1961 to 1973, it operated as the third level of German ice hockey, before being dropped to the fourth level for the 1974–75 season. For 2013–14, there were five regions of the league, the Regionalliga West, Regionalliga Nord, Regionalliga Ost, Regionalliga Südwest, and the Bayernliga.

== Current teams ==
2022/23 German teams in Regionalliga

Bayernliga Teams: 2022-23 Season
| Team | Location | | Arena | Capacity | Founded | Joined league |
| Team | City | State | Arena | Capacity | Founded | Joined league |
|---|---|---|---|---|---|---|
| Amberg Wild Lions | Amberg | Bavaria | Eishalle Amberg | 3,000 | 1950 | 2020 |
| Buchloe Pirates | Buchloe | Bavaria | Eissportverein Buchloe | 2,000 | 1961 | 2008 |
| Eispiraten Dorfen | Dorfen | Bavaria | Dr. Rudolf Stadion Dorfen | 1,200 | 1967 | 1999 |
| Erding Gladiators | Erding | Bavaria | Eissporthalle Erding | 2,576 | 1978 | 2016 |
| River Rats Geretsried | Geretsried | Bavaria | Heinz Schneider Eisstadion | 3,000 | 2006 | 2015 |
| Kempten Sharks | Kempten | Bavaria | Eisstadion Kempten | 3,600 | 2007 | 2016 |
| EHC Königsbrunn | Königsbrunn | Bavaria | Hydro-Tech Eisarena Königsbrunn | 1,250 | 1951 | 2018 |
| TEV Miesbach | Miesbach | Bavaria | Eissporthalle Miesbach | 1,900 | 1928 | 2018 |
| Pegnitz Ice Dogs | Pegnitz | Bavaria | Eisstadion Pegnitz | 1,500 | 1950 | 2022 |
| Peißenberg Miners | Peißenberg | Bavaria | Eissporthalle Peißenberg | 3,050 | 1956 | 2004 |
| Pfaffenhofen Eishogs | Pfaffenhofen | Bavaria | Eisstadion Pfaffenhofen | 1,500 | 1970 | 1998 |
| Schongau Mammuts | Schongau | Bavaria | Eisstadion Schongau | 2,000 | 1863 | 2016 |
| Schweinfurt Mighty Dogs | Schweinfurt | Bavaria | Icedome Schweinfurt | 3,500 | 1994 | 2018 |
| Devils Ulm/Neu-Ulm | Neu-Ulm | Bavaria | Eissporthalle Donaubad | 3,000 | 1995 | 2020 |
| EHC Waldkraiburg | Waldkraiburg | Bavaria | Eissporthalle Waldkraiburg | 3,500 | 1991 | 2019 |

Regionalliga Nord Teams: 2022-23 Season
| Team | Location | | Arena | Capacity | Founded | Joined league |
| Team | City | State | Arena | Capacity | Founded | Joined league |
|---|---|---|---|---|---|---|
| Adendorfer EC | Adendorf | Lower Saxony | Walter Maack Eisstadion Adendorf | 2,400 | 1994 | 2014 |
| Weserstars Bremen | Bremen | (Bremen (state)) Bremen | Eissporthalle Paradice | 1,900 | 2000 | 2013 |
| Hamburger SV | Hamburg | Hamburg | Eisstadion Stellingen Hamburg | 1,500 | 1968 | 2016 |
| EC Harzer Falken | Braunlage | Lower Saxony | Eisstadion Braunlage | 2,548 | 2012 | 2019 |
| Salzgitter Icefighters | Salzgitter | Lower Saxony | Eissporthalle in Salzgitter-Lebenstedt | 2,300 | 2009 | 2011 |
| Sande Jadehaie | Sande | Lower Saxony | Eishalle Sande | 1,200 | 2015 | 2018 |
| Beach Devils Timmendorf | Timmendorfer Strand | Schleswig-Holstein | Eissport- und Tennis Centrum Timmendorfer Strand | 999 | 2018 | 2021 |
| Wunstorf Lions | Wunstorf | Lower Saxony | Eisstadion Mellendorf | 3,700 | 2016 | 2022 |

Regionalliga Ost Teams: 2022-23 Season
| Team | Location | | Arena | Capacity | Founded | Joined league |
| Team | City | State | Arena | Capacity | Founded | Joined league |
|---|---|---|---|---|---|---|
| Eisbären Juniors Berlin | Berlin | Berlin | Wellblechpalast | 4,695 | 1954 | 2019 |
| FASS Berlin | Berlin | Berlin | Erika-Heß-Eisstadion | 2,800 | 1962 | 2017 |
| Chemnitz Crashers | Chemnitz | Saxony | Eissporthalle Küchwald Chemnitz | 3,850 | 1914 | 2014 |
| ESC Dresden 1b | Dresden | Saxony | Joynext Arena | 3,309 | 1909 | 2010 |
| Tornado Niesky | Niesky | Saxony | Kunsteisstadion Niesky | 1,800 | 1994 | 2015 |
| Schönheider Wölfe | Schönheide | Saxony | Eissporthalle Schönheide | 1,500 | 1936 | 2017 |
| ES Weißwasser | Weißwasser | Saxony | Eisstadion Weißwasser | 2,750 | 1991 | 2020 |

Regionalliga Südwest Teams: 2022-23 Season
| Team | Location | | Arena | Capacity | Founded | Joined league |
| Team | City | State | Arena | Capacity | Founded | Joined league |
|---|---|---|---|---|---|---|
| SC Bietigheim-Bissingen 1b | Bietigheim-Bissingen | Baden-Württemberg | Eisarena Ellental | 2,662 | 1981 | 1999 |
| Baden Rhinos Hügelsheim | Hügelsheim | Baden-Württemberg | Baden Airpark Eisarena Rheinmünster | 1,200 | 1972 | 2011 |
| Eisbären Heilbronn | Heilbronn | Baden-Württemberg | Knorr Arena | 4,000 | 2006 | 2018 |
| Mad Dogs Mannheim | Mannheim | Baden-Württemberg | SAP Arena 2 | 1,500 | 1972 | 2022 |
| Pforzheim Bisons | Pforzheim | Baden-Württemberg | St. Maur Halle | 1,600 | 1897 | 2020 |
| Stuttgart Rebels | Stuttgart | Baden-Württemberg | Eiswelt Stuttgart | 3,000 | 1997 | 2006 |
| Zweibrücken Hornets | Zweibrücken | Rhineland-Palatinate | Peter Cunningham Memorial Ice Arena Zweibrücken | 1,400 | 1987 | 1991 |

Regionalliga West Teams: 2022-23 Season
| Team | Location | | Arena | Capacity | Founded | Joined league |
| Team | City | State | Arena | Capacity | Founded | Joined league |
|---|---|---|---|---|---|---|
| Bergisch Gladbach Realstars | Bergisch Gladbach | North Rhine-Westphalia | Lanxess Arena 2 | 504 | 2002 | 2021 |
| Eisadler Dortmund | Dortmund | North Rhine-Westphalia | Eissportzentrum Westfalenhallen | 5,000 | 2013 | 2021 |
| Luchse Lauterbach | Lauterbach | Hesse | Eissport-Arena Lauterbach | 1,000 | 2012 | 2022 |
| Neusser EV | Neuss | North Rhine-Westphalia | Eissporthalle Neuss im Südpark | 2,850 | 1973 | 2015 |
| EHC Neuwied | Neuwied | Rhineland-Palatinate | Ice House Neuwied | 1,380 | 2007 | 2016 |
| Ratinger Ice Aliens | Ratingen | North Rhine-Westphalia | Eissporthalle am Sandbach Ratinger | 3,800 | 1997 | 2015 |
| Wiehl Penguins | Wiehl | North Rhine-Westphalia | Eissporthalle Wiehl | 1,500 | 1976 | 2021 |
