= Patrik Urbanec =

Czech ice hockey player

- Born: 9 October 1993 (age 31); Zlín, Czech Republic
- Height: 6 ft 0 in (183 cm)
- Weight: 187 lb (85 kg; 13 st 5 lb)
- Position: Defenseman
- Shoots: Left
- Czech team Former teams: HC Vítkovice; PSG Zlín
- Playing career: 2012–present

Patrik Urbanec (born 9 October 1993) is a Czech professional ice hockey player. He is currently playing for HC Vítkovice of the Czech Extraliga.

Urbanec made his Czech Extraliga debut playing with HC Zlín during the 2012–13 Czech Extraliga season.
