= Erik Němec =

Czech ice hockey player

- Born: 21 December 1993 (age 31) Metylovice, Czech Republic
- Height: 184 cm (6 ft 0 in)
- Weight: 82 kg (181 lb; 12 st 13 lb)
- Position: Forward
- Shoots: Left
- Oberliga team Former teams: Selber Wölfe; HC Vítkovice
- Playing career: 2013–present

Erik Němec (born 21 December 1993) is a Czech ice hockey forward currently playing for Selber Wölfe of the German Oberliga.
