= Andreas Pauli =

German ice hockey player

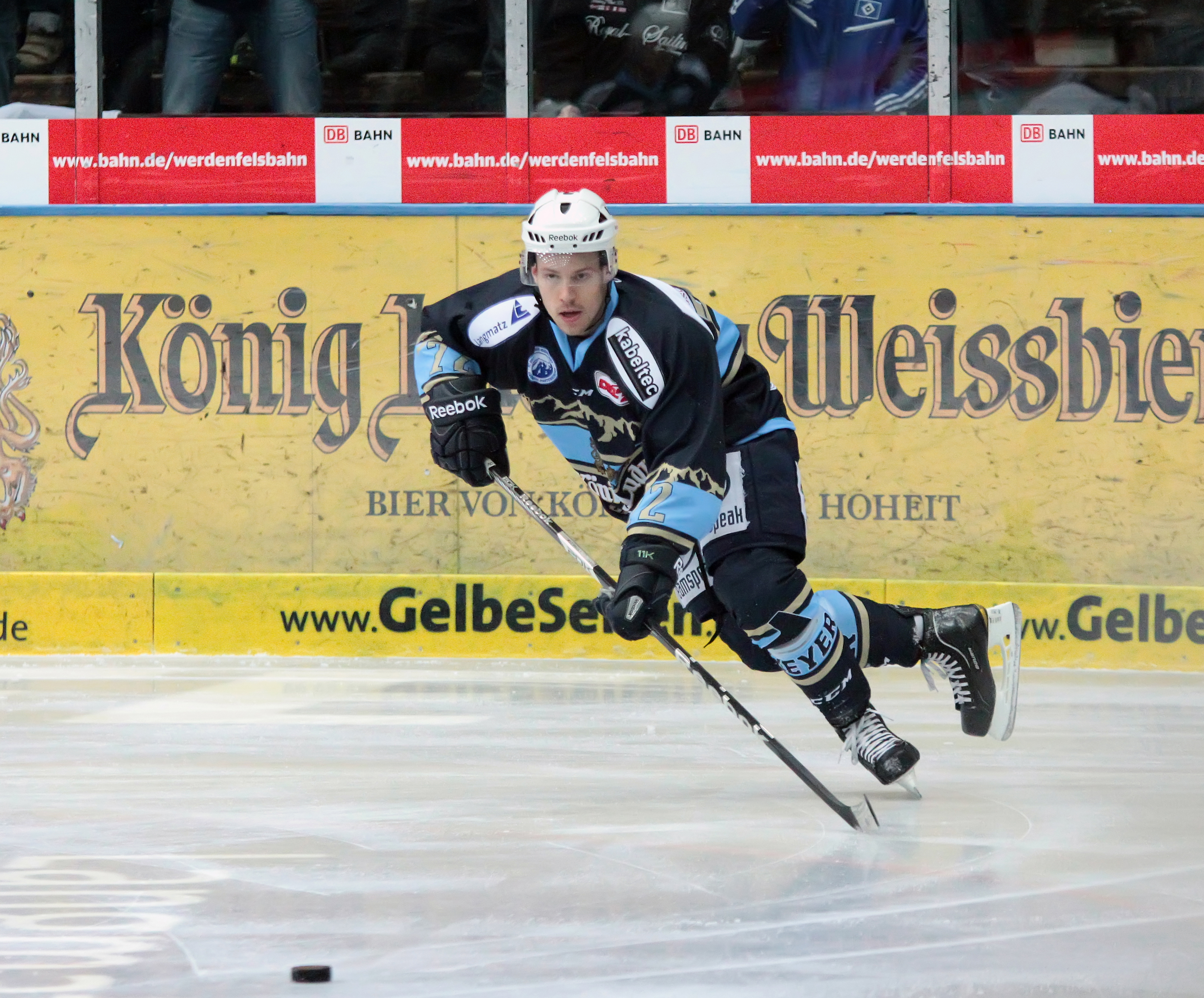
- Andreas Pauli, is a German ice hockey player
- Born: October 27, 1993 (age 31); Bad Tölz, Germany
- Height: 5 ft 9 in (175 cm)
- Weight: 185 lb (84 kg; 13 st 3 lb)
- Position: Forward
- Shoots: Left
- DEL2 team Former teams: Bad Nauheim; DEL; EHC München
- NHL draft: Undrafted
- Playing career: 2011–present

Andreas Pauli (born October 27, 1993) is a German professional ice hockey player. He is currently playing for Bad Nauheim of the German DEL2.

Pauli last made his Deutsche Eishockey Liga (DEL) debut playing with EHC München during the 2011-12 season.
