= FASS Berlin =

- City: Berlin, Germany
- League: Regionalliga
- Conference: East
- Founded: 1962
- Home arena: Erika-Heß Stadium
- Website: http://www.fass-berlin.de

FASS Berlin, short for Freier Akademischer Sportverein Sigmundshof e.V. ("Free Academic Sports Club Siegmundshof") is a sports club from Berlin, Germany which is renowned for its ice hockey department. The club was originally founded as a football club on December 17, 1962, and has an ice hockey department since 1972.

The men's team is playing in the German fourth division and finished the 2022/23 season in second place. The female team is playing in the third division and finished the 2022/23 season in second place as well.
