= 2026–27 Latvian Hockey League season =

Latvian Hockey League season

2026–27 Latvian Hockey League
- League: OHL Baltic Championship
- Sport: Ice hockey
- Duration: 5 September 2026 – April 2027
- Teams: 9
- TV partner(s): TV4, Sportacentrs.com, Sport1, hockey.lt

Regular season

Playoffs

Finals

Latvian Hockey League seasons
- ← 2025–26 2027–28 →

The 2026–27 OHL Baltic Championship season is the 36th season of the Latvian Hockey League, the top level of ice hockey in Latvia. This season is contested by nine teams – five from Latvia, two from Lithuania, and one from Estonia and Ukraine. The regular season started on 5 September 2026 and is scheduled to end on 28 February 2027.

The champions of this season will be called Baltic champions, while champions of Latvia and Lithuania will be determined by positions in regular season.

The playoffs format remained unchanged from the last season with top six teams in the regular advancing to the postseason.

Mogo/RSU are the defending champions.

== Teams ==
Team	City
Energija	Elektrėnai
Hockey Punks – Mototoja	(Lithuania) Vilnius
Kyiv Capitals	Kyiv
Liepājas HK	Liepāja
Mogo/RSU	Riga
Panter	(Estonia) Tallinn
Prizma/RTU	Riga
Rīgas HS/Dinaburga	(Latvia) Riga/Daugavpils
Zemgale/LBTU	Jelgava

== Regular season ==
Pos	Team	Pld	W	OTW	OTL	L	GF	GA	GD	Pts	Final result
1	Kyiv Capitals	15	12	0	0	3	85	31	+54	24	Advance to playoffs
2	Mogo/RSU	11	10	0	1	0	59	14	+45	21	Advance to playoffs
3	Liepājas HK	15	8	1	2	4	50	42	+8	20	Advance to playoffs
4	Panter	15	6	2	3	4	51	42	+9	19	Advance to playoffs
5	Zemgale/LBTU	10	5	2	1	2	40	27	+13	15	Advance to playoffs
6	Rīgas HS/Dinaburga	16	3	2	0	11	30	78	−48	10	Advance to playoffs
7	Prizma/RTU	14	3	1	0	10	46	60	−14	8	
8	Hockey Punks – Mototoja	14	3	0	2	9	29	77	−48	8	
9	Energija	10	1	1	0	8	21	40	−19	4	

Updated to match(es) played on 15 November 2026. Source: LHF.lv

== Awards ==
=== Players of the Month ===
The league started to name three best players of the month starting with the 2023–24 season.

Month	First Star	Second Star	Third Star
September	Deivids Sarkanis (Kyiv Capitals)	Kārlis Mežsargs (Mogo/RSU)	Pauls Svars (Kyiv Capitals)
October	Eduards Hugo Jansons (Kyiv Capitals)	Georg Vladimirov (Panter)	Deivids Sarkanis (Kyiv Capitals)
