= 2025–26 Latvian Hockey League season =

Latvian Hockey League season

2025–26 Latvian Hockey League
- League: Latvian Hockey Higher League
- Sport: Ice hockey
- Duration: 5 September 2025 – 16 April 2026
- Teams: 9
- TV partner(s): TV4, Sportacentrs.com, Sport1, hockey.lt

Regular season
- Winners: Mogo/RSU

Playoffs

Finals
- Champions: Mogo/RSU
- Runners-up: Zemgale/LBTU
- Finals MVP: Niks Feņenko (Mogo/RSU)

Latvian Hockey League seasons
- ← 2024–25 2026–27 →

The 2025–26 Latvian Hockey League season was the 35th season of the Latvian Hockey League, the top level of ice hockey in Latvia. This season was contested by nine teams – five from Latvia, two from Lithuania, and one from Estonia and Ukraine. The regular season started on 5 September 2025 and ended on 11 March 2026. The playoffs started on 13 March and ended on 16 April.

The playoffs format was changed for this season with top six teams in the regular advancing to the postseason.

Mogo/RSU were the defending champions and successfully defended it when they once again defeated Zemgale/LBTU in the finals in five games. Mogo/RSU's Niks Feņenko was named was named the most valuable player (MVP) of the finals series.

== Teams ==
Team	City
Energija	Elektrėnai
Hockey Punks – Mototoja	(Lithuania) Vilnius
Liepājas HK	Liepāja
HS Rīga	(Latvia) Riga
Kyiv Capitals	Kyiv
Mogo/RSU	Riga
Panter	(Estonia) Tallinn
Prizma	Riga
Zemgale/LBTU	Jelgava

== Regular season ==
Pos	Team	Pld	W	OTW	OTL	L	GF	GA	GD	Pts	Final result
1	Mogo/RSU	40	27	4	2	7	198	94	+104	64	Advance to playoffs
2	Zemgale/LBTU	40	29	1	4	6	188	74	+114	64	Advance to playoffs
3	Liepājas HK	40	27	3	3	7	182	98	+84	63	Advance to playoffs
4	Kyiv Capitals	40	26	2	5	7	192	109	+83	61	Advance to playoffs
5	Prizma	40	11	6	2	21	148	177	−29	36	Advance to playoffs
6	Panter	40	12	4	2	22	115	163	−48	34	Advance to playoffs
7	HS Rīga	40	8	5	2	25	92	179	−87	28	
8	Energija	40	6	2	4	28	72	176	−104	20	
9	Hockey Punks – Mototoja	40	6	1	4	29	96	213	−117	18	

Source: LHF.lv

== Playoffs ==
Quarterfinals
4	Kyiv Capitals	3
5	Prizma	0
3	Liepājas HK	3
6	Panter	0

Semifinals
1	Mogo/RSU	4
4	Kyiv Capitals	2
2	Zemgale/LBTU	4
3	Liepājas HK	3

Finals
1	Mogo/RSU	4
2	Zemgale/LBTU	1

Source: LHF.lv

== Awards ==
=== Players of the Month ===
The league started to name three best players of the month starting with the 2023–24 season.

Month	First Star	Second Star	Third Star
September	Aksels Ozols (Zemgale/LBTU)	Kārlis Ozoliņš (Liepājas HK)	Roberts Jekimovs (Prizma)
October	Kaspars Daugaviņš (Mogo/RSU)	Deivids Sarkanis (Mogo/RSU)	Atte Rajala (Zemgale/LBTU)
November	Kārlis Ozoliņš (Liepājas HK)	Kārlis Mežsargs (Mogo/RSU)	Michael Valenta (Liepājas HK)
December	Edijs Brahmanis (Prizma)	Kevins Strādnieks (Liepājas HK)	Mārtiņš Karsums (Kyiv Capitals)
January	Roberts Jekimovs (Prizma)	Patriks Zabusovs (Zemgale/LBTU)	Niks Feņenko (Mogo/RSU)
February	Rinalds Vutkevičs (Liepājas HK)	Pauls Svars (Liepājas HK)	Michael Valenta (Liepājas HK)

=== Best players ===
The league named five best players at the end of the regular season:

- Sergejs Žoltoks award (best forward) – Roberts Jekimovs (Prizma)
- Kārlis Skrastiņš award (best defenceman) – Pauls Svars (Liepājas HK)
- Uldis Opits award (best goaltender) – Jānis Voris (Kyiv Capitals)
- Elmārs Bauris award (top scorer) – Roberts Jekimovs (Prizma)
- Aleksejs Auziņš award (best young player) – Kristers Obuks (HS Rīga)
