= 2013–14 Dinamo Riga season =

Season of Latvian ice hockey club

2013–14 Dinamo Riga
- Division: 3rd Bobrov
- Conference: 5th Western
- 2013–14 record: 22–11–5–16
- Home record: 12–6–1–8
- Road record: 10–5–4–8
- Goals for: 141
- Goals against: 122

Team information
- General manager: Normunds Sējējs
- Coach: Artis Ābols
- Captain: Sandis Ozoliņš
- Alternate captains: Paul Szczechura; Georgijs Pujacs
- Arena: Arena Riga
- Average attendance: 7,614 (73.92%)

Team leaders
- Goals: Marcel Hossa (22)
- Assists: Kyle Wilson (27)
- Points: Kyle Wilson (44)
- Penalty minutes: Arvīds Reķis (63)
- Plus/minus: Mat Robinson (+19)
- Wins: Mikael Tellqvist (22)
- Goals against average: Mikael Tellqvist (1.86)

The 2013–14 Dinamo Riga season was the sixth season for the Kontinental Hockey League (KHL) franchise that was established on April 7, 2008.

== Standings ==
D	C	Team	GP	W	OTW	OTL	L	GF	GA	PTS
3	5	Dinamo Riga	54	22	11	5	16	141	122	93

Last updated: 4 March 2014
Source: KHL.ru, KHL.ru

== Schedule and results ==
=== Pre-season ===
2013 Pre-Season Game Log
#	Date	Home	Score	Visitor	OT	Decision	Attendance	Record	Recap
1	August 2	Dinamo	8–1	Toros Neftekamsk				1–0–0–0
2	August 8	Dinamo	3–0	Neftyanik Almetyevsk				2–0–0–0
3^{[a]}	August 12	AK Bars Kazan	2–3	Dinamo	OT			2–0–1–0
4^{[a]}	August 13	Lev Praha	4–3	Dinamo	SO			2–0–2–0
5 ^{[a]}	August 15	Dinamo	0–1	Salavat Yulaev Ufa				2–0–2–1
6^{[a]}	August 16	Dinamo	3–4	Salavat Yulaev Ufa	SO			2–0–2–1
7^{[b]}	August 26	Dinamo	3–1	Lokomotiv Yaroslavl			8 570	3–0–3–1
8 ^{[b]}	August 27	Dinamo	2–3	AK Bars Kazan	OT		7 350	3–0–4–1
9^{[b]}	August 29	Dinamo	1–2	SKA Saint Petersburg	OT		9 120	3–0–5–1

- ^{a} Games was played at Tipsport Arena in Prague, Czech Republic.
- ^{b} Games was played at Arena Riga in Riga, Latvia.

=== Regular season ===
2013–14 Game Log

September: 5–1–1–4 (Home: 2–1–0–1; Road: 3–0–1–3)
#	Date	Home	Score	Visitor	OT	Decision	Attendance	Record	Pts	Recap
1	September 5	Dinamo	2–1	Dinamo Minsk		Tellqvist	9 250	1–0–0–0	3
2	September 8	Medveščak Zagreb	1–5	Dinamo		Tellqvist	6 800	2–0–0–0	6
3	September 10	Spartak Moscow	1–3	Dinamo		Sedlaček	2 453	3–0–0–0	9
4	September 12	Donbass Donetsk	2–4	Dinamo		Tellqvist	3 785	4–0–0–0	12
5	September 14	CSKA Moscow	2–1	Dinamo	SO	Tellqvist	3 869	4–0–1–0	13
6	September 17	Dinamo	1–3	AK Bars Kazan		Tellqvist	6 270	4–0–1–1	13
7	September 19	Dinamo	3–2	Dynamo Moscow	SO	Tellqvist	9 580	4–1–1–1	15
8	September 21	Dinamo	6–1	Vityaz Podolsk		Tellqvist	7 420	5–1–1–1	18
9	September 23	Dinamo	2–3	Torpedo Nizhny Novgorod		Sedlaček	5 550	5–1–1–2	18
10	September 27	Amur Khabarovsk	2–1	Dinamo		Tellqvist	7 100	5–1–1–3	18
11	September 29	Admiral Vladivostok	3–0	Dinamo		Tellqvist	4 500	5–1–1–4	18

October: 6–2–2–1 (Home: 2–1–0–1; Road: 4–1–2–0)
#	Date	Home	Score	Visitor	OT	Decision	Attendance	Record	Pts	Recap
12	October 1	Sibir Novosibirsk	1–4	Dinamo		Sedlaček	4 500	6–1–1–4	21
13	October 3	Metallurg Novokuznetsk	0–2	Dinamo		Tellqvist	2 835	7–1–1–4	24
14	October 9	Dinamo	2–5	Salavat Yulaev Ufa		Tellqvist	7 280	7–1–1–5	24
15	October 11	Dinamo	2–1	Neftekhimik Nizhnekamsk		Tellqvist	8 250	8–1–1–5	27
16	October 13	Dinamo	3–2	Metallurg Magnitogorsk	OT	Sedlaček	8 860	8–2–1–5	29
17	October 17	Slovan Bratislava	3–4	Dinamo		Tellqvist	10 055	9–2–1–5	32
18	October 21	Lev Prague	2–1	Dinamo	SO	Tellqvist	4 006	9–2–2–5	33
19	October 23	Dinamo	4–3	CSKA Moscow		Tellqvist	9 600	10–2–2–5	36
20	October 26	SKA Saint Petersburg	4–3	Dinamo	SO	Sedlaček	12 300	10–2–3–5	37
21	October 28	Atlant Moscow Oblast	1–2	Dinamo	SO	Tellqvist	5 200	10–3–3–5	39
22	October 31	Lokomotiv Yaroslavl	1–2	Dinamo		Tellqvist	7 214	11–3–3–5	42

November: 3–4–0–2 (Home: 2–2–0–0; Road: 1–2–0–2)
#	Date	Home	Score	Visitor	OT	Decision	Attendance	Record	Pts	Recap
23	November 1	Severstal Cherepovets	0–1	Dinamo		Tellqvist	3 650	12–3–3–5	45
24	November 13	Dinamo	3–2	Barys Astana	SO	Tellqvist	7 120	12–4–3–5	47
25	November 15	Dinamo	3–1	Avangard Omsk		Tellqvist	9 390	13–4–3–5	50
26	November 17	Dinamo	4–3	Yugra Khanty-Mansiysk	OT	Sedlaček	9 450	13–5–3–5	52
27	November 19	Dinamo	3–1	Avtomobilist Yekaterinburg		Tellqvist	6 440	14–5–3–5	55
28	November 22	Barys Astana	3–4	Dinamo	SO	Tellqvist	4 070	14–6–3–5	57
29	November 24	Avangard Omsk	5–2	Dinamo		Sedlaček	7 100	14–6–3–5	59
30	November 26	Yugra Khanty-Mansiysk	1–2	Dinamo	OT	Tellqvist	2 300	14–7–3–6	59
31	November 28	Avtomobilist Yekaterinburg	3–1	Dinamo		Tellqvist	5 000	14–7–3–7	59

December: 3–0–1–3 (Home: 3–0–1–3; Road: 0–0–0–0)
#	Date	Home	Score	Visitor	OT	Decision	Attendance	Record	Pts	Recap
32	December 1	Dinamo	1–2	Atlant Moscow Oblast		Tellqvist	5 950	14–7–3–8	59
33	December 4	Dinamo	4–1	Lokomotiv Yaroslavl		Tellqvist	6 360	15–7–3–8	62
34	December 6	Dinamo	1–2	Severstal Cherepovets		Tellqvist	7 190	15–7–3–9	62
35	December 8	Dinamo	6–4	SKA Saint Petersburg		Sedlaček	10 314	16–7–3–9	65
36	December 13	Dinamo	2–0	Traktor Chelyabinsk		Tellqvist	9 450	17–7–3–9	68
37	December 28	Dinamo	1–2	Lev Praha	SO	Tellqvist	10 170	17–7–4–9	69
38	December 29	Dinamo	1–3	Slovan Bratislava		Tellqvist	10 100	17–7–4–10	69

January: 3–4–1–4 (Home: 1–2–0–2; Road: 2–2–1–2)
#	Date	Home	Score	Visitor	OT	Decision	Attendance	Record	Pts	Recap
39	January 3	Salavat Yulaev Ufa	4–3	Dinamo	OT	Sedlaček	7 850	17–7–5–10	70
40	January 5	Neftekhimik Nizhnekamsk	1–2	Dinamo	OT	Tellqvist	4 500	17–8–5–10	72
41	January 7	Metallurg Magnitogorsk	6–2	Dinamo		Sedlaček	7 056	17–8–5–11	72
42	January 9	Traktor Chelyabinsk	2–5	Dinamo		Tellqvist	7 000	18–8–5–11	75
43	January 13	Dinamo	2–5	Admiral Vladivostok		Tellqvist	6 240	18–8–5–12	75
44	January 15	Dinamo	4–3	Metallurg Novokuznetsk	OT	Tellqvist	6 160	18–9–5–12	77
45	January 17	Dinamo	2–3	Sibir Novosibirsk		Sedlaček	9 570	18–9–5–13	77
46	January 19	Dinamo	4–1	Amur Khabarovsk		Tellqvist	8 490	19–9–5–13	80
47	January 22	Vityaz Podolsk	6–2	Dinamo		Tellqvist	2 100	19–9–5–14	80
48	January 24	Dynamo Moscow	2–4	Dinamo		Tellqvist	5 746	20–9–5–14	83
49	January 26	AK Bars Kazan	2–3	Dinamo	SO	Sedlaček	4 331	20–10–5–14	85
50	January 28	Torpedo Nizhny Novgorod	0–1	Dinamo	SO	Sedlaček	5 250	20–11–5–14	87

February: 2–0–0–0 (Home: 2–0–0–0; Road: 0–0–0–0)
#	Date	Home	Score	Visitor	OT	Decision	Attendance	Record	Pts	Recap
51	February 26	Dinamo	5–1	Medveščak Zagreb		Tellqvist	7 350	21–11–5–14	90
52	February 28	Dinamo	3–2	Spartak Moscow		Sedlaček	9 290	22–11–5–14	93

March: 0–0–0–2 (Home: 0–0–0–1; Road: 0–0–0–1)
#	Date	Home	Score	Visitor	OT	Decision	Attendance	Record	Pts	Recap
53	March 2	Dinamo Minsk	5–2	Dinamo		Sedlaček	14 500	22–11–5–15	93
54	March 4	Dinamo	0–1	Donbass Donetsk		Sedlaček	7 150	22–11–5–16	93

Legend: Win Overtime/shootout win Overtime/shootout loss Loss

== Player stats ==
Updated on 26 February 2014.
Source: hockeydb.com
Source: eliteprospects.com
Source: khl.ru

Skaters

Regular season
Player	GP	G	A	Pts	+/-	PIM
Kyle Wilson	49	17	27	44	9	26
Marcel Hossa	47	21	18	39	9	33
Paul Szczechura	51	16	18	34	17	40
Miks Indrašis	49	12	19	31	17	18
Mat Robinson	51	9	16	25	18	12
Sandis Ozoliņš	47	5	17	22	4	46
Vitālijs Pavlovs	50	6	8	14	−2	28
Aleksandrs Ņiživijs	34	2	11	13	−5	14
Marcel Haščák	30	6	6	12	10	17
Roberts Bukarts	34	4	8	12	6	14
Kristaps Sotnieks	50	5	5	10	0	49
Mārtiņš Cipulis	37	5	4	9	−1	6
Gints Meija	24	3	4	7	6	8
Krišjānis Rēdlihs	39	5	2	7	4	16
Andris Džeriņš	41	4	3	7	−4	34
Georgijs Pujacs	41	1	4	5	18	53
Juris Upītis	30	1	3	4	−1	2
Gunārs Skvorcovs	35	2	2	4	2	6
Vojtěch Polák^{‡}	9	0	3	3	0	4
Māris Bičevskis	23	0	2	2	1	13
Arvīds Reķis	43	0	2	2	0	63
Jamie Johnson	10	1	0	1	−3	6
Rustams Begovs	7	1	0	1	1	2
Deivids Sarkanis	3	0	1	1	1	0
Oskars Cibuļskis	12	1	0	1	3	4
Rodrigo Laviņš	13	0	1	1	2	4
Artūrs Kuzmenkovs^{‡}	25	0	1	1	−2	4
Edgars Siksna	2	0	0	0	1	1
Mārtiņš Porejs^{‡}	2	0	0	0	−1	0
Andris Siksnis^{‡}	4	0	0	0	0	0
Jēkabs Rēdlihs	9	0	0	0	1	6

Goaltenders

Regular season
Player	GP	TOI	W	L	OT	GA	GAA	SA	SV%	SO	G	A	PIM
Mikael Tellqvist	38	2286:13	21	10	7	69	1.81	931	.931	3	0	0	4
Jakub Sedlaček	14	817:04	5	5	4	39	2.86	384	.908	1	0	0	2

^{†}Denotes player spent time with another team before joining the Dinamo. Stats reflect time with the Dinamo only.
^{‡}Traded mid-season
Bold/italics denotes franchise record

== Transactions ==
=== Free agent signed ===
Player	Former team	Date	Contract terms
Sandis Ozoliņš	Atlant Mytishchi	May 8, 2013	One-year contract
Mat Robinson	Timrå	May 14, 2013	
Marcel Hossa	Lev Praha	May 16, 2013	
Kyle Wilson	Norfolk Admirals	June 12, 2013	One-year contract
Aleksandrs Ņiživijs	Lev Praha	June 12, 2013	One-year contract
Mārtiņš Cipulis	Lev Praha	July 4, 2013	One-year contract
Artūrs Kuzmenkovs	Liepājas Metalurgs	July 9, 2013	Two-year contract
Georgijs Pujacs	Avangard Omsk	July 19, 2013	One-year contract
Jakub Sedláček	HC Zlin	August 21, 2013	One-year contract
Edgars Siksna	Liepājas Metalurgs	August 21, 2013	
Kārlis Ozoliņš	Liepājas Metalurgs	August 21, 2013	
Marcel Haščák	HC Kosice	August 21, 2013	One-year contract
Vojtěch Polák	HC Davos	September 18, 2013	
Jēkabs Rēdlihs	Modo	November 14, 2013	
Jamie Johnson	Hershey Bears	December 16, 2013	
Lauris Dārziņš	Traktor Chelyabinsk	January 8, 2013	

=== Free agents lost ===
Player	New team	Date	Contract terms
Guntis Galviņš	Yugra Khanty-Mansiysk	May 2, 2013	One-year contract
Mārtiņš Karsums	Dynamo Moscow	May 3, 2013	One-year contract
Jēkabs Rēdlihs	Unknown	May 16, 2013	
Raitis Ivanāns	Unknown	June 21, 2013	
Alexandre Giroux	Ambrì-Piotta	June 28, 2013	One-year contract
Ģirts Ankipāns	Retired	July 1, 2013	
Jamie Johnson	Hershey Bears	July 5, 2013	One-year contract
Kristers Gudļevskis	Tampa Bay Lightning	August 3, 2013	Entry-level contract
Elvijs Biezais	Jokipojat	August 8, 2013	Loan
Mārtiņš Porejs	Jokipojat	August 8, 2013	Loan
Miks Lipsbergs	Jokipojat	August 8, 2013	Loan
Vojtěch Polák	HC Trinec	November 3, 2013	

=== Extensions ===
Player	Date	Contract terms
Arvīds Reķis	May 2, 2013	One-year extension
Paul Szczechura	May 2, 2013	One-year extension
Vitālijs Pavlovs	May 3, 2013	Two-year extension
Andris Džeriņš	May 3, 2013	Two-year extension
Oskars Cibuļskis	May 3, 2013	Two-year extension
Rodrigo Laviņš	June 12, 2013	One-year extension
Māris Jučers	September 3, 2013	One-year extension
Juris Upītis	September 3, 2013	One-year extension
Mārtiņš Porejs	September 3, 2013	One-year extension

== Draft picks ==
Dinamo Rigas' picks at the 2013 KHL Junior Draft, which was held in Donetsk, Ukraine on May 25–26, 2013.

Round	#	Player	Pos	Nationality	College/Junior/Club team (League)
2	39	Filip Pyrochta	D	Czech Republic	Bílí Tygři Liberec (CZE)
3	68	Christián Jaroš	F	Slovakia	Košice jr.
4	109	Dāvis Zembergs	F	Latvia	Boston Bandits (EmJHL)
5	143	Rodrigo Ābols	C	Latvia	SK Riga (LHL)
