= 2023–24 Latvian Hockey League season =

Latvian Hockey League season

2023–24 Latvian Hockey League
- League: Latvian Hockey Higher League
- Sport: Ice hockey
- Duration: 8 September 2023 – 4 April 2024
- Number of teams: 9
- TV partner(s): TV4, Sportacentrs.com, Sport1, hockey.lt, TV6 (final games only)

Regular season
- Winners: Zemgale/LBTU

Playoffs

Finals
- Champions: Mogo/LSPA
- Runners-up: Zemgale/LBTU
- Finals MVP: Linards Feldbergs (Mogo/LSPA)

Latvian Hockey League seasons
- ← 2022–23 2024–25 →

The 2023–24 Latvian Hockey League season was the 33rd season of the Latvian Hockey League, the top level of ice hockey in Latvia. This season was contested by nine teams – five from Latvia, three from Lithuania, and one from Estonia. The regular season started on 8 September 2023 and was scheduled to end on 28 February 2024, but ended on 29 February, after a game between Kurbads and HS Rīga on 17 February was postponed. The playoffs started on 2 March and ended on 4 April.

The playoffs format was changed for this season with top six teams in the regular advancing to the postseason. Two best teams directly qualified for the semifinals, while teams that finished from third to sixth played in a best-of-five quarterfinals series. In the semifinals and finals teams played in a best-of-seven series.

Zemgale/LBTU were the defending champions and lost the finals series in five games to Mogo/LSPA who won their third title. Linards Feldbergs of Mogo/LSPA was named the most valuable player (MVP) of the finals series.

== Teams ==
Team	City
7bet-Hockey Punks	(Lithuania) Vilnius
Airwell Energija	Elektrėnai
HS Rīga	(Latvia) Riga
Kaunas City	Kaunas
Kurbads	Riga
Mogo/LSPA	Riga
Panter	(Estonia) Tallinn
Prizma	Riga
Zemgale/LBTU	Jelgava

== Regular season ==
Pos	Team	Pld	W	OTW	OTL	L	GF	GA	GD	Pts	Final result
1	Zemgale/LBTU	32	25	1	3	3	180	68	+112	55	Advance to playoffs
2	Mogo/LSPA	32	24	3	1	4	193	58	+135	55	Advance to playoffs
3	Kurbads	32	19	2	5	6	154	81	+73	47	Advance to playoffs
4	Panter	32	17	2	0	13	122	106	+16	38	Advance to playoffs
5	Prizma	32	15	3	1	13	118	118	0	37	Advance to playoffs
6	HS Rīga	32	13	1	2	16	100	128	−28	30	Advance to playoffs
7	Kaunas City	32	9	3	1	19	113	147	−34	25	
8	Airwell Energija	32	5	1	0	26	69	190	−121	12	
9	7bet-Hockey Punks	32	1	0	3	28	59	212	−153	5	

Source: LHF.lv

== Playoffs ==
Quarterfinals
4	Panter	1
5	Prizma	3
3	Kurbads	3
6	HS Rīga	0

Semifinals
1	Zemgale/LBTU	4
5	Prizma	0
2	Mogo/LSPA	4
3	Kurbads	0

Finals
1	Zemgale/LBTU	1
2	Mogo/LSPA	4

Source: LHF.lv

== Awards ==
=== Players of the Month ===
The league started to name three best players of the month starting with this season.

Month	First Star	Second Star	Third Star
October	Mārtiņš Porejs (Zemgale/LBTU)	Mārtiņš Karsums (Zemgale/LBTU)	Artūrs Ozoliņš (Kurbads)
November	Henrijs Ančs (Mogo/LSPA)	Lauris Bajaruns (Mogo/LSPA)	Tadas Kumeliauskas (Airwell Energija)
December	Rasmus Kiik (Panter)	Ondřej Machala (Kaunas City)	Mariuss Bajaruns-Galejs (Zemgale/LBTU)
January	Daniil Fursa (Panter)	Denys Honcharenko (Kaunas City)	Villem-Henrik Koitmaa (Panter)
February	Lauris Bajaruns (Mogo/LSPA)	Deivids Sarkanis (Mogo/LSPA)	Kristers Ansons (Mogo/LSPA)

=== Best players ===
The league named five best players at the end of the regular season:

- Sergejs Žoltoks award (best forward) – Gints Meija (Mogo/LSPA)
- Kārlis Skrastiņš award (best defenceman) – Saveli Novikov (Panter)
- Uldis Opits award (best goaltender) – Henrijs Ančs (Mogo/LSPA)
- Elmārs Bauris award (top scorer) – Gints Meija (Mogo/LSPA)
- Aleksejs Auziņš award (best young player) – Olivers Mūrnieks (Mogo/LSPA)
