= 2025–26 IIHF Continental Cup =

2025–2026 IIHF Continental Cup

Tournament details
- Dates: 14 October 2025 – 17 January 2026
- Teams: 14

Final positions
- Champions: (United Kingdom) Nottingham Panthers (2nd title)
- Runners-up: (Kazakhstan) Torpedo Ust-Kamenogorsk
- Third place: (Denmark) Herning Blue Fox
- Fourth place: (Poland) GKS Katowice

Tournament statistics
- Games played: 27

The 2025–26 Continental Cup was the 28th edition of the IIHF Continental Cup, Europe's second-tier ice hockey club competition organised by International Ice Hockey Federation. The competition began on 14 October 2025 and the final tournament was played from 14 to 17 January 2026.

== Qualified teams ==
Team	Qualification
Enter in the Final
(Denmark) Herning Blue Fox	2024–25 Metal Ligaen runners-up
(United Kingdom) Nottingham Panthers	Host, 2024-25 EIHL Playoff Champions
HC Torpedo	2024–25 Kazakhstan Hockey Championship runners-up
(Poland) GKS Katowice	2024–25 Polska Hokej Liga runners-up
Enter in the second round
(France) Angers Ducs	2024–25 Coupe de France champions
(Italy) SG Cortina	2024-25 IHL – Elite champions
Enter in the first round
(Ukraine) HC Kremenchuk	2024–25 Ukrainian Hockey Championship champions
(Romania) ACS Gyergyoi HK	2024–25 Romanian Hockey League champions
(Hungary) Budapest JAHC	2024–25 OB I bajnokság champions
(Estonia) Narva PSK	2024–25 Meistriliiga runners-up
(Iceland) Skautafelag Akureyar	2024–25 Icelandic Hockey League champions
(Lithuania) Hockey Punks	2024–25 Lithuania Hockey League champions
(Serbia) SKHL Crvena zvezda	2024–25 Serbian Hockey League champions
(Latvia) HK Mogo	2024–25 Latvian Hockey League champions

== First round ==
=== Group A ===
The Group A tournament was played in Vilnius, Lithuania, from 17 to 19 October 2025.

Pos	Team	Pld	W	OTW	OTL	L	GF	GA	GD	Pts	Qualification
1	(Latvia) HK Mogo	3	3	0	0	0	32	4	+28	9	Second round
2	(Lithuania) Hockey Punks (H)	3	2	0	0	1	15	18	−3	6	
3	(Iceland) Skautafélag Akureyrar	3	0	1	0	2	8	17	−9	2	
4	(Estonia) Narva PSK	3	0	0	1	2	10	26	−16	1	

Source: IIHF
(H) Host

All times are local (UTC+3).

17 October 2025; 16:00	Narva PSK (Estonia)	1–13 (0–5, 1–4, 0–4)	(Latvia) HK Mogo	Pramogų Arena, Vilnius; Attendance: 50

Game reference
12 min	Penalties	2 min
8	Shots	64

17 October 2025; 20:00	Hockey Punks (Lithuania)	6–1 (2–0, 2–0, 2–1)	(Iceland) Skautafélag Akureyrar	Pramogų Arena, Vilnius; Attendance: 250

Game reference
22 min	Penalties	8 min
35	Shots	25

18 October 2025; 14:00	HK Mogo (Latvia)	7–2 (3–0, 3–1, 1–1)	(Iceland) Skautafélag Akureyrar	Pramogų Arena, Vilnius; Attendance: 40

Game reference
20 min	Penalties	12 min
46	Shots	13

18 October 2025; 18:00	Hockey Punks (Lithuania)	8–5 (3–0, 2–4, 3–1)	(Estonia) Narva PSK	Pramogų Arena, Vilnius; Attendance: 220

Game reference
16 min	Penalties	18 min
41	Shots	22

19 October 2025; 14:00	Skautafélag Akureyrar (Iceland)	5–4 OT (0–1, 2–0, 2–3) (OT: 1–0)	(Estonia) Narva PSK	Pramogų Arena, Vilnius; Attendance: 45

Game reference
33 min	Penalties	8 min
40	Shots	35

19 October 2025; 18:00	HK Mogo (Latvia)	12–1 (6–0, 1–1, 5–0)	(Lithuania) Hockey Punks	Pramogų Arena, Vilnius; Attendance: 203

Game reference
10 min	Penalties	14 min
30	Shots	22

=== Group B ===
The Group B tournament was played in Remetea, Romania, from 17 to 19 October 2025.

Pos	Team	Pld	W	OTW	OTL	L	GF	GA	GD	Pts	Qualification
1	(Romania) ACS Gyergyoi HK (H)	3	3	0	0	0	28	1	+27	9	Second round
2	(Ukraine) HC Kremenchuk	3	2	0	0	1	15	13	+2	6	
3	(Hungary) Budapest JAHC	3	1	0	0	2	12	10	+2	3	
4	(Serbia) SKHL Crvena zvezda	3	0	0	0	3	3	34	−31	0	

Source: IIHF
(H) Host

All times are local (UTC+3).

17 October 2025; 15:00	HC Kremenchuk (Ukraine)	3–2 (0–1, 1–0, 2–1)	(Hungary) Budapest JAHC	Remetea Ice Arena, Remetea; Attendance: 374

Game reference
6 min	Penalties	2 min
27	Shots	40

17 October 2025; 19:00	ACS Gyergyoi HK (Romania)	13–0 (3–0, 6–0, 4–0)	(Serbia) SKHL Crvena zvezda	Remetea Ice Arena, Remetea; Attendance: 1,358

Game reference
4 min	Penalties	16 min
73	Shots	9

18 October 2025; 15:00	SKHL Crvena zvezda (Serbia)	0–12 (0–4, 0–4, 0–4)	(Ukraine) HC Kremenchuk	Remetea Ice Arena, Remetea; Attendance: 246

Game reference
14 min	Penalties	37 min
43	Shots	74

18 October 2025; 19:00	Budapest JAHC (Hungary)	1–4 (0–0, 1–3, 0–1)	(Romania) ACS Gyergyoi HK	Remetea Ice Arena, Remetea; Attendance: 1,687

Game reference
12 min	Penalties	12 min
14	Shots	31

19 October 2025; 15:00	Budapest JAHC (Hungary)	9–3 (3–1, 2–1, 4–1)	(Serbia) SKHL Crvena zvezda	Remetea Ice Arena, Remetea; Attendance: 137

Game reference
8 min	Penalties	14 min
77	Shots	23

19 October 2025; 19:00	ACS Gyergyoi HK (Romania)	11–0 (3–0, 4–0, 4–0)	(Ukraine) HC Kremenchuk	Remetea Ice Arena, Remetea; Attendance: 1,342

Game reference
39 min	Penalties	43 min
50	Shots	21

== Second round ==
=== Group C ===
The Group C tournament was played in Angers, France, from 14 to 16 November 2025.

Pos	Team	Pld	W	OTW	OTL	L	GF	GA	GD	Pts	Qualification
1	(France) Angers Ducs (H)	3	2	0	0	1	12	9	+3	6 (Note: Angers Ducs 3 Pts, +1 GD; HK Mogo 3 Pts, +1 GD; SG Cortina 3 Pts, –2 GD. HK Mogo 4–6 Angers Ducs.)	Final round
2	(Latvia) HK Mogo	3	2	0	0	1	13	8	+5	6	Final round
3	(Italy) SG Cortina	3	2	0	0	1	9	9	0	6	
4	(Romania) ACS Gyergyoi HK	3	0	0	0	3	6	14	−8	0	

Source: IIHF
(H) Host
Notes:

All times are local (UTC+1).

14 November 2025; 16:30	SG Cortina (Italy)	5–3 (3–1, 0–1, 2–1)	(Romania) ACS Gyergyoi HK	Angers IceParc, Angers; Attendance: 388

Game reference
6 min	Penalties	4 min
19	Shots	30

14 November 2025; 20:30	HK Mogo (Latvia)	4–6 (0–2, 3–1, 1–3)	(France) Angers Ducs	Angers IceParc, Angers; Attendance: 2,817

Game reference
6 min	Penalties	8 min
26	Shots	30

15 November 2025; 16:30	SG Cortina (Italy)	0–3 (0–0, 0–2, 0–1)	(Latvia) HK Mogo	Angers IceParc, Angers; Attendance: 1,209

Game reference
4 min	Penalties	8 min
26	Shots	22

15 November 2025; 20:30	Angers Ducs (France)	3–1 (2–0, 0–0, 1–1)	(Romania) ACS Gyergyoi HK	Angers IceParc, Angers; Attendance: 3,254

Game reference
2 min	Penalties	4 min
13	Shots	32

16 November 2025; 14:30	ACS Gyergyoi HK (Romania)	2–6 (1–2, 1–4, 0–0)	(Latvia) HK Mogo	Angers IceParc, Angers; Attendance: 1,117

Game reference
8 min	Penalties	8 min
38	Shots	27

16 November 2025; 18:30	Angers Ducs (France)	3–4 (2–1, 1–2, 0–1)	(Italy) SG Cortina	Angers IceParc, Angers; Attendance: 2,846

Game reference
10 min	Penalties	4 min
31	Shots	25

== Final round ==
The final tournament was played in Nottingham, Great Britain, from 14 to 17 January 2026.

=== Preliminary round ===
All times are local (UTC±0).

==== Group A ====
Pos	Team	Pld	W	OTW	OTL	L	GF	GA	GD	Pts	Qualification
1	(United Kingdom) Nottingham Panthers (H)	2	2	0	0	0	8	0	+8	6	Final
2	(Poland) GKS Katowice	2	0	1	0	1	3	6	−3	2	Third place game
3	(Latvia) HK Mogo	2	0	0	1	1	2	7	−5	1	Fifth place game

Source: IIHF
(H) Host

14 January 2026; 19:00	HK Mogo (Latvia)	0–4 (0–0, 0–2, 0–2)	(United Kingdom) Nottingham Panthers	Motorpoint Arena, Nottingham; Attendance: 4,695

Game reference
4 min	Penalties	6 min
20	Shots	35

15 January 2026; 19:00	GKS Katowice (Poland)	3–2 GWS (1–0, 0–1, 1–1) (OT: 0–0) (SO: 1–0)	(Latvia) HK Mogo	Motorpoint Arena, Nottingham; Attendance: 3,698

Game reference
16 min	Penalties	4 min
29	Shots	38

16 January 2026; 19:00	Nottingham Panthers (United Kingdom)	4–0 (0–0, 2–0, 2–0)	(Poland) GKS Katowice	Motorpoint Arena, Nottingham; Attendance: 6,162

Game reference
2 min	Penalties	0 min
37	Shots	24

==== Group B ====
Pos	Team	Pld	W	OTW	OTL	L	GF	GA	GD	Pts	Qualification
1	(Kazakhstan) Torpedo Ust-Kamenogorsk	2	1	0	1	0	8	5	+3	4	Final
2	(Denmark) Herning Blue Fox	2	1	0	0	1	6	7	−1	3	Third place game
3	(France) Angers Ducs	2	0	1	0	1	4	6	−2	2	Fifth place game

Source: IIHF

14 January 2026; 14:30	Angers Ducs (France)	1–4 (0–0, 1–3, 0–1)	(Denmark) Herning Blue Fox	Motorpoint Arena, Nottingham; Attendance: 3,381

Game reference
6 min	Penalties	6 min
22	Shots	30

15 January 2026; 14:30	Herning Blue Fox (Denmark)	2–6 (1–1, 1–3, 0–2)	(Kazakhstan) Torpedo Ust-Kamenogorsk	Motorpoint Arena, Nottingham; Attendance: 3,273

Game reference
6 min	Penalties	4 min
43	Shots	23

16 January 2026; 14:30	Torpedo Ust-Kamenogorsk (Kazakhstan)	2–3 OT (0–0, 0–0, 2–2) (OT: 0–1)	(France) Angers Ducs	Motorpoint Arena, Nottingham; Attendance: 3,445

Game reference
10 min	Penalties	62 min
35	Shots	42

=== Fifth place game ===
17 January 2026; 11:00	Angers Ducs (France)	3–4 (1–1, 1–1, 1–2)	(Latvia) HK Mogo	Motorpoint Arena, Nottingham; Attendance: 2,124

Game reference
6 min	Penalties	4 min
23	Shots	28

=== Third place game ===
17 January 2026; 15:00	Herning Blue Fox (Denmark)	3–2 GWS (0–1, 0–0, 2–1) (OT: 0–0) (SO: 1–0)	(Poland) GKS Katowice	Motorpoint Arena, Nottingham; Attendance: 4,182

Game reference
0 min	Penalties	4 min
45	Shots	22

=== Final ===
17 January 2026; 19:00	Nottingham Panthers (United Kingdom)	4–2 (1–0, 2–0, 1–2)	(Kazakhstan) Torpedo Ust-Kamenogorsk	Motorpoint Arena, Nottingham; Attendance: 6,371

Game reference

Kevin Carr
Goalies
Vladislav Pestov
Referees:
(Finland) Joonas Kova
(Slovenia) Milan Zrnič
Linesmen:
(Hungary) Norbert Muzsic
(Latvia) Dāvis Rozītis

Spencer (Volcan, Doherty) (EA) – 17:49	1–0
Lemos (Volcan, Henbrant) – 34:25	2–0
Zech (PS) – 35:34	3–0
	3–1	58:29 – Rifel (Khoroshev, Borovikov)
	3–2	59:04 – Rakhmanov (Khoroshev, Musorov) (EA)
Garát (Alfaro) (EN) – 59:48	4–2

6 min
Penalties
6 min
42
Shots
21
