= Baltic Hockey League =

Competition among the ice hockey clubs from Baltic countries

- Sport: Ice hockey
- Founded: 2018
- Founder: Estonian Ice Hockey Association, Latvian Ice Hockey Federation & Lithuanian Ice Hockey Federation
- No. of teams: 6
- Country: Estonia (2 teams); Latvia (2 teams); Lithuania (2 teams)
- Continent: Europe
- Related competitions: Baltic League

The Baltic Hockey League (Estonian: Balti Hokiliiga; Latvian: Baltijas hokeja līga; Lithuanian: Baltijos lygos) is a professional ice hockey competition based in the Baltic states featuring club teams from Estonia, Latvia and Lithuania. The competition was founded in 2018, and the first edition of the competition began in November, 2020.

== History ==
In the early 2000s the Baltic League was formed and featured teams from the three Baltic states. The inaugural competition was won by Latvian side HK Liepājas Metalurgs, following which the competition was not held again. The Baltic Cup was held during the 2004–05 season, and also introduced a team from neighbouring Poland, this competition also only lasted one season, and marked the end of regional club competition in the Baltic states.

On November 9, 2018, the Baltic Hockey League was first announced to the public via a press conference from the Estonian, Latvian and Lithuanian ice hockey governing bodies. The first edition of the tournament was scheduled to begin in October 2019 with the final round being held in December 2019, featuring 8 clubs split into two conferences. The conferences were named after two successful players from the Baltic states, namely Darius Kasparaitis and Sandis Ozoliņš. The Lithuanian delegation confirmed that the two highest placed teams in the previous seasons Lithuania Hockey League would qualify for the tournament. Despite the initial plan for the competition to start in 2019, it wasn't until the following year that the league played its inaugural season, with 6 teams taking part.

== Format ==
Location of teams of the 2020 Baltic Hockey League.

Teams competing in the Ozoliņš group.

Teams competing in the Kasparaitis group.

The maiden edition of the competition was separated into two rounds. The six participants were initially split into two groups of three teams. The Ozoliņš group was made up of HK Mogo, Kaunas Hockey and Tartu Välk 494 with games being played at the Astri Arena in Tartu, Estonia. The Kasparaitis group consisted of Hockey Punks Vilnius, HK Liepāja and HC Everest with the games being held at Utenos pramogų Arena in Vilnius, Lithuania. Games in both groups took place between 27 and 29 November 2020. The two best teams from each group qualifies for the final round, a round-robin competition with the team with the best record being crowned champion. Final round games were originally scheduled to take place between 18 and 20 December 2020 in Olimpiskais centrs in Rēzekne, Latvia however, on 15 December it was announced that the finals were postponed until 11–14 February 2021 as a result of several HK Mogo players having been exposed to COVID-19. As HK Mogo had recently played Liepāja in the Latvian Hockey Higher League, both sides were unable to field teams. In early February the final round was again postponed due to the pandemic, with the date to be announced when the Covid situation improves.

== Teams ==
The 2020 edition of the Baltic Hockey League saw the following teams compete:

- HC Everest ( Tallinn, Estonia)
- HK Liepāja ( Liepāja, Latvia)
- HK Mogo ( Riga, Latvia)
- Hockey Punks Vilnius ( Vilnius, Lithuania)
- Kaunas Hockey ( Kaunas, Lithuania)
- Tartu Välk 494 ( Tartu, Estonia)

Estonian side Narva PSK were originally scheduled to be part of the competition, however they were unable to participate as a result of the COVID-19 pandemic, and subsequently HC Everest took their place.

== 2020 Results ==
=== First round ===
==== Group Ozoliņš ====
	Club	GP	W	T	L	GF	GA	Pts
1.	(Estonia) Tartu Välk 494 (Q)	1	1	0	0	10	4	3
2.	(Latvia) HK Mogo (Q)	1	1	0	0	7	2	3
3.	(Lithuania) Kaunas Hockey	2	0	0	2	6	17	0

Advance to Final round.

==== Results ====
27 November 2020; 17:00	Tartu Välk 494 (Estonia)	10–4 (4-1, 2–1, 4-2)	(Lithuania) Kaunas Hockey	Astri Arena, Tartu; Attendance: 275

Game reference

Referee:
Anton Semjonov
Linesmen:
Egor Loginov
Toivo Tilko

Garanin (Tsyganov, Koll) - 4:50	1-0
	1-1	11:15 - Malashkevich (Reshetnikov, Chekmaryov)
Sapovalov - 13:04	2-1
Titarenko (Gusynin, Voytsekhovsky) - 18:02	3-1
Koll (Garanin, Galimulin) - 19:06	4-1
Akimov (Galimulin, Brakss) - 23:46	5-1
	5-2	31:38 - Pravilo
Sapovalov (Gusynin, Voytsekhovsky) - 39:38	6-2
	6-3	40:30 - Chekmaryov (Malashkevich, Zukauskas)
Titarenko, Voytsekhovsky, Gusynin - 43:29	7-3
Voytsekhovsky (Gusynin) - 45:25	8-3
Gusynin - 47:27	9-3
	9-4	58:45 - Guoga (Starovoitov)
Akimov (Krivosheev, Garanin) - 59:07	10-4

22 min
Penalties
20 min
48
Shots
34

28 November 2020; 18:00	Kaunas Hockey (Lithuania)	2–7 (0–2, 1–3, 1–2)	(Latvia) HK Mogo	Astri Arena, Tartu; Attendance: 110

Game reference

Referee:
Kriss Kupcus
Linesmen:
Anton Semjonov
Uldis Buss

	0–1	3:11- Straupe (Rancevs)
	0–2	13:54 - Zelubovskis (Cukste, Rēdlihs)
Jagelavicius (Reshetnikov, Lazarenovs) - 27:46	1-2
	1-3	26:25 - Rancevs (Demitrs)
	1-4	32:49 - Zelubovskis (Gricinskis), Ziemins
	1-5	36:59 - Krastenbergs (Demitrs)
	1-6	45:07 - Gricinskis (Cukste)
	1-7	51:32 - Kaimins (Bazevics)
Danilenka (Pravilo, Binkulis) - 59:14	2-7

18 min
Penalties
16 min
26
Shots
58

29 November 2020	HK Mogo (Latvia)	Cancelled	(Estonia) Tartu Välk 494	Astri Arena, Tartu; Attendance: 0

Game reference

The scheduled game between HK Mogo and Tartu Välk 494 was cancelled due to 4 Välk players testing positive for COVID-19. However, the two teams had already achieved qualification for the final round.

==== Group Kasparaitis ====
	Club	GP	W	T	L	GF	GA	Pts
1.	(Latvia) HK Liepāja (Q)	2	2	0	0	14	3	6
2.	(Lithuania) Hockey Punks Vilnius (Q)	2	1	0	1	4	5	3
3.	(Estonia) HC Everest	2	0	0	2	4	14	0

Advance to Final round.

==== Results ====
27 November 2020; 18:00	Hockey Punks Vilnius (Lithuania)	3–2 (2-1, 1–0, 0-1)	(Estonia) HC Everest	Utenos pramogų Arena, Vilnius; Attendance: 0

Game reference

Simas Baltrūnas
Goalies
Maksim Klimenko
Referees:
Jakšys Benas
Rudzinskas Vladislovas
Linesmen:
Stepankevičius Laurynas
Saščenkov Aleksej

Kuveka (Bacevičius, Miliūnas) – 9:17	1–0
	1–1	15:18 - Antonenko (Parshin, Len) (PP)
Verenis (Kuzminov, Markovsky) - 18:19	2-1
Kudrevičius - 30:22	3-1
	3-2	41:21 - Bedniakov (Levanov)

43 min
Penalties
26 min
37
Shots
27

28 November 2020; 18:00	(Estonia) HC Everest	2–11 (0–4, 1–2, 1–5)	(Latvia) HK Liepāja	Utenos pramogų Arena, Vilnius; Attendance: 0

Game reference

Anatoli Sizov
Goalies
Maris Jučers
Referees:
Rudzinskas Vladislovas
Jakolev Andrejs
Linesmen:
Saščenkov Aleksej
Bakus Simas

	0–1	2:00 - Fomins (Miezis, Freidenfelds)
	0–2	6:22 - Kalns (Zabis)
	0-3	9:42 - Strauss (Petrovics)
	0-4	14:01 - Kalns
	0-5	23:09 - Miezis (Petrovics)
	0-6	24:31 - Planics (Zabis, Nimanis)
Antonenko (Bedniakov, Lupanov) – 36:01	1-6
	1-7	45:17 - Fomins (Freidenfelds)
	1-8	47:30 - Kalns (Zabis, Nimanis) (PP)
Levanov (Tsaltsev) – 49:22	2-8
	2-9	51:02 - Zabis (Kalns, Planics)
	2-10	53:24 - Freidenfelds (Miezis, Demiters)
	2-11	56:11 - Ozolinš (Miezis)

8 min
Penalties
4 min
74
Shots
18

29 November 2020; 18:00	HK Liepāja (Latvia)	3–1 (1–0, 1–0, 1–1)	(Lithuania) Hockey Punks Vilnius	Utenos pramogų Arena, Vilnius; Attendance: 0

Game reference

Laurynas Lubys
Goalies
Simas Baltrūnas
Referees:
Jakovlev Andrejs
Jakšys Benas
Linesmen:
Bakus Simas
Stepankevičius Laurynas

Freidenfelds (Strauss) – 2:28	1–0
Fomins (Planics, Kalns) (PP) – 29:50	2–0
	2–1	40:07 - Verenis (Bendžius)
Miezis (Mazurs-Mag) – 49:44	3-1

4 min
Penalties
8 min
56
Shots
32

==== Final Round ====
	Club	GP	W	T	L	GF	GA	Pts
1.	(Latvia) HK Liepāja	0	0	0	0	0	0	0
2.	(Latvia) HK Mogo	0	0	0	0	0	0	0
3.	(Lithuania) Hockey Punks Vilnius	0	0	0	0	0	0	0
3.	(Estonia) Tartu Välk 494	0	0	0	0	0	0	0

Champion

==== Results ====
TBA	Tartu Välk 494 (Estonia)	v	(Latvia) HK Mogo	Olimpiskais centrs, Rēzekne

TBA	Hockey Punks Vilnius (Lithuania)	v	(Latvia) HK Liepāja	Olimpiskais centrs, Rēzekne

TBA	Hockey Punks Vilnius (Lithuania)	v	(Latvia) HK Mogo	Olimpiskais centrs, Rēzekne

TBA	HK Liepāja (Latvia)	v	(Estonia) Tartu Välk 494	Olimpiskais centrs, Rēzekne

TBA	Hockey Punks Vilnius (Lithuania)	v	(Estonia) Tartu Välk 494	Olimpiskais centrs, Rēzekne

TBA	HK Mogo (Latvia)	v	(Latvia) HK Liepāja	Olimpiskais centrs, Rēzekne

The final round was originally scheduled for 15–18 December 2020, however, it was postponed until February 2021 as a result complications arising from the COVID-19 pandemic. It was subsequently delayed a second time in early February 2021, with the date of play to be determined.

=== Awards and statistics ===
==== Awards ====
- Best players selected by the directorate:
  - Best Goalkeeper: TBA
  - Best Defenseman: TBA
  - Best Forward: TBA
  - MVP: TBA

Source: hockey.lt

==== Scoring leaders ====
List shows the top skaters sorted by points, then goals.

Player	Team	GP	G	A	Pts	PIM	POS
(Latvia) Egils Kalns	HK Liepāja	2	3	2	5	0	F
(Latvia) Māris Miezis	HK Liepāja	2	2	3	5	0	F
(Russia) Fyodor Gusynin	Tartu Välk 494	1	1	4	5	0	F
(Latvia) Raivo Freidenfelds	HK Liepāja	2	2	2	4	0	F
(Ukraine) Olexei Voytsekhovsky	Tartu Välk 494	1	1	3	4	2	F

GP = Games played; G = Goals; A = Assists; Pts = Points; PIM = Penalties in minutes; POS = Position
Source: EliteProspects.com
