= 2024–25 Latvian Hockey League season =

Latvian Hockey League season

2024–25 Latvian Hockey League
- League: Latvian Hockey Higher League
- Sport: Ice hockey
- Duration: 7 September 2024 – April 2025
- Number of teams: 7
- TV partner(s): TV4, Sportacentrs.com, Sport1, hockey.lt

Regular season
- Winners: Mogo/RSU

Playoffs

Finals
- Champions: Mogo/RSU
- Runners-up: Zemgale/LBTU
- Finals MVP: Nils Mauriņš (Mogo/RSU)

Latvian Hockey League seasons
- ← 2023–24 2025–26 →

The 2024–25 Latvian Hockey League season was the 34th season of the Latvian Hockey League, the top level of ice hockey in Latvia. This season was contested by seven teams – four from Latvia, two from Lithuania, and one from Estonia. The regular season started on 7 September 2024 and ended on 15 March 2025. The playoffs started on 18 March and ended on 11 April.

The playoffs format was changed for this season with top four teams in the regular advancing to the postseason.

Mogo/RSU were the defending champions, and successfully defended their title after a 4–1 series win in the finals against Zemgale/LBTU, while Nils Mauriņš of Mogo/RSU was named the most valuable player (MVP) of the finals series.

== Teams ==
Team	City
7bet-Hockey Punks	(Lithuania) Vilnius
Energija	Elektrėnai
HS Rīga	(Latvia) Riga
Mogo/RSU	Riga
Panter	(Estonia) Tallinn
Prizma	Riga
Zemgale/LBTU	Jelgava

== Regular season ==
Pos	Team	Pld	W	OTW	OTL	L	GF	GA	GD	Pts	Final result
1	Mogo/RSU	36	31	2	1	2	214	59	+155	67	Advance to playoffs
2	Zemgale/LBTU	36	27	2	3	4	196	67	+129	61	Advance to playoffs
3	Panter	36	16	5	3	12	114	122	−8	45	Advance to playoffs
4	7bet-Hockey Punks	36	11	2	2	21	96	189	−93	28	Advance to playoffs
5	Energija	36	10	3	1	22	105	148	−43	27	
6	Prizma	36	9	3	3	21	117	147	−30	27	
7	HS Rīga	36	4	1	5	26	70	180	−110	15	

Source: LHF.lv

== Playoffs ==
Semifinals
1	Mogo/RSU	4
4	7bet-Hockey Punks	0
2	Zemgale/LBTU	4
3	Panter	0

Finals
1	Mogo/RSU	4
2	Zemgale/LBTU	1

Source: LHF.lv

== Awards ==
=== Players of the Month ===
The league started to name three best players of the month starting with the 2023–24 season.

Month	First Star	Second Star	Third Star
September	Daniil Fursa (Panter)	Kevins Strādnieks (Zemgale/LBTU)	Gints Meija (Mogo/RSU)
October	Villem-Henrik Koitmaa (Panter)	Elviss Želubovskis (Mogo/RSU)	Edijs Brahmanis (Prizma)
November	Pēteris Purmalis (Zemgale/LBTU)	Lenards Jānis Sprieslis (HS Rīga)	Gatis Gricinskis (Zemgale/LBTU)
December	Mārtiņš Karsums (Zemgale/LBTU)	—	—
January	Gints Meija (Mogo/RSU)	Henrijs Ančs (Mogo/RSU)	Kevins Strādnieks (Zemgale/LBTU)
February	Kristers Ansons (Mogo/RSU)	Rasmus Kiik (Panter)	Leevi Sorvali (Zemgale/LBTU)

=== Best players ===
The league named five best players at the end of the regular season:

- Sergejs Žoltoks award (best forward) – Gints Meija (Mogo/RSU)
- Kārlis Skrastiņš award (best defenceman) – Krišjānis Rēdlihs (Mogo/RSU)
- Uldis Opits award (best goaltender) – Henrijs Ančs (Mogo/RSU)
- Elmārs Bauris award (top scorer) – Gints Meija (Mogo/RSU)
- Aleksejs Auziņš award (best young player) – Kristers Ansons (Mogo/RSU)
