= Baltic League (disambiguation) =

Baltic League may refer to:

- Baltic League, Baltic men's football club tournament
- 1990 Baltic League, Soviet tournament for its Baltic republics with undefined status
- Women's Baltic Football League, Baltic women's football club tournament
- Baltic Basketball League, Baltic states men's basketball league
- Baltic Women's Basketball League, Baltic states women's basketball league
- Baltic League (ice hockey), a defunct Baltic states men's ice hockey league
- Baltic Hockey League, a Baltic states men's ice hockey league
- Baltic Men Volleyball League, Baltic States men's volleyball league
- Baltic Women's Volleyball League, Baltic states women's volleyball league
- Baltic Handball League, Baltic states handball league

== See also ==
- Baltic Cup (disambiguation)
