= Kaspars Daugaviņš =

Latvian ice hockey player (born 1988)

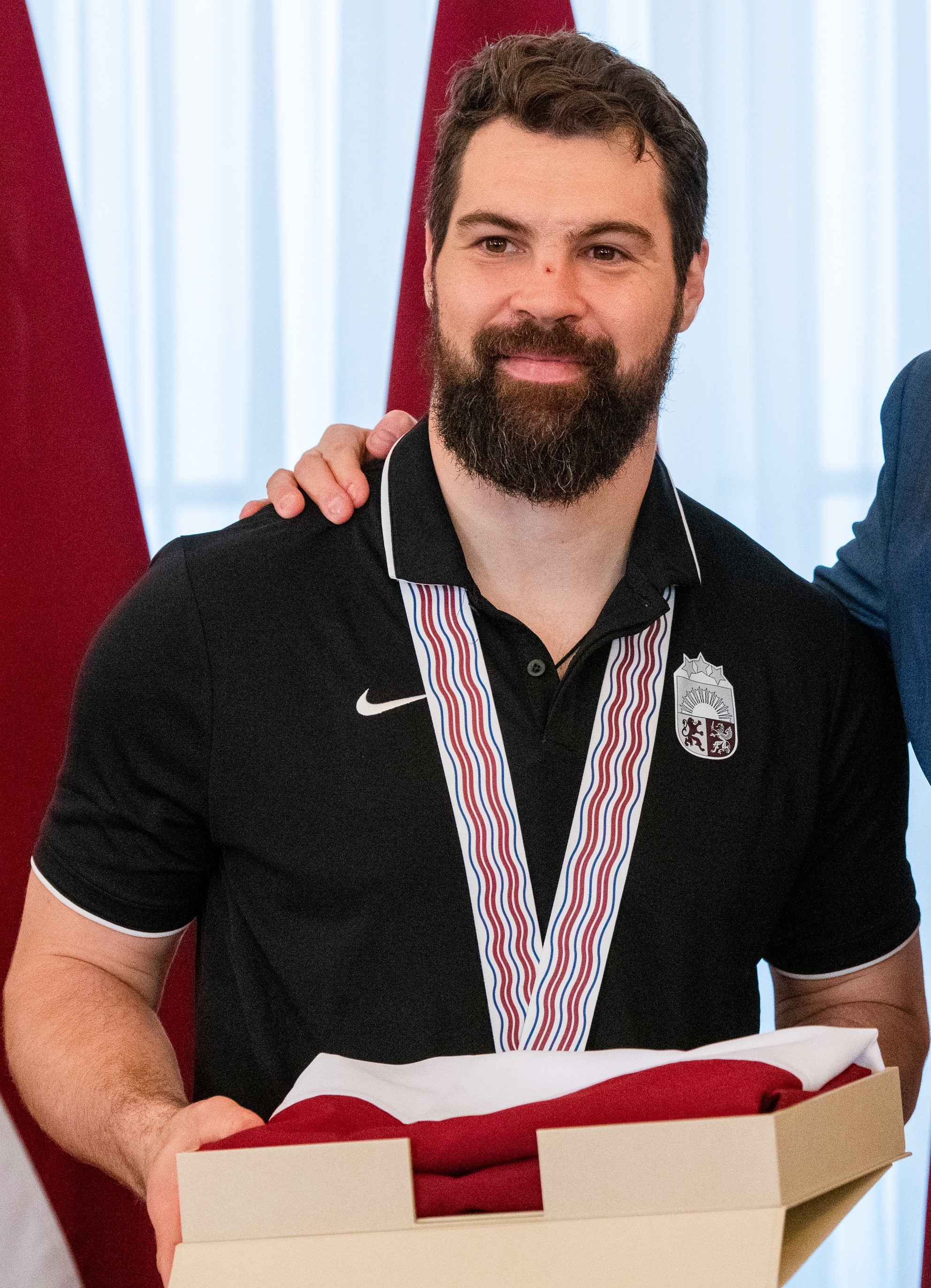
- Daugaviņš in 2023
- Born: May 18, 1988 (age 38) Riga, Latvian SSR, Soviet Union
- Height: 6 ft 0 in (183 cm)
- Weight: 220 lb (100 kg; 15 st 10 lb)
- Position: Forward
- Shot: Left
- DEL2 team Former teams: EC Kassel Huskies; Riga 2000; Prizma/Riga 86; Ottawa Senators; Dinamo Riga; Boston Bruins; Genève-Servette HC; Dynamo Moscow; Torpedo Nizhny Novgorod; Spartak Moscow; Vityaz Podolsk; SC Bern; Iserlohn Roosters; Dukla Michalovce; Mogo/RSU
- National team: Latvia
- NHL draft: 91st overall, 2006; Ottawa Senators
- Playing career: 2003–present

Kaspars Daugaviņš (born May 18, 1988) is a Latvian professional ice hockey player who is a forward for EC Kassel Huskies of the Deutsche Eishockey Liga 2. Daugaviņš has played professionally in the National Hockey League (NHL) for the Ottawa Senators and Boston Bruins. The Senators selected him in the third round, 91st overall, in the 2006 NHL entry draft.

== Playing career ==
As a youth, Daugaviņš played in the 2002 Quebec International Pee-Wee Hockey Tournament with a team from Riga.

=== Professional ===
After the Toronto St. Michael's Majors failed to qualify for the playoffs in the 2006–07 season, the Ottawa Senators assigned Daugaviņš to the Binghamton Senators to finish the 2006–07 AHL season. In 11 games with Binghamton, Daugaviņš had two goals, both coming against the Albany River Rats goaltender Tyler Weiman in a 5–4 Binghamton win. On June 1, 2007, Daugaviņš signed a three-year, entry-level contract with the Ottawa Senators.

He spent the 2009–10 season with Binghamton, scoring 21 goals and 46 points in 72 games as the team failed to reach the playoffs. Daugaviņš also made his NHL debut on January 14, 2010, against the New York Rangers at Madison Square Garden, going pointless in 8:26 of ice time in a 2–0 Ottawa victory.

Daugaviņš scored his first NHL goal on October 30, 2011, beating Jonas Gustavsson of the Toronto Maple Leafs in a 3–2 Ottawa victory. As the 2011–12 season progressed, Daugaviņš became a regular in the Ottawa lineup, playing 65 games and scoring five goals and six assists. In July 2012, he was scheduled for an arbitration hearing with the Senators, but the salary negotiation process was avoided when he agreed with the team to a one-year, one-way deal worth $635,000.

After his fifth season in the KHL and completing his third season with Torpedo Nizhny Novgorod in 2017–18, Daugaviņš left as a free agent to sign a two-year contract with his fourth KHL club, Spartak Moscow, on May 3, 2018.

After two productive seasons with Spartak, Daugaviņš left as a free agent, signing a one-year contract with Vityaz Podolsk on May 3, 2020.

On June 10, 2021, Daugaviņš returned to the National League and signed a two-year deal with SC Bern.

He left Bern after just one season with the team, signing with German club, Iserlohn Roosters of the Deutsche Eishockey Liga (DEL), on August 8, 2022. In the 2022–23 season with the Roosters, he led the team in scoring with 21 goals and 49 points through 55 regular season games. With Iserlohn missing the playoffs for a second consecutive season, he left the club at the conclusion of his contract on March 10, 2023.

On September 13, 2023, Daugaviņš signed a two-year contract with Dukla Michalovce of the Slovak Extraliga.

On November 25, 2024, the Michalovce club announced that Daugaviņš had retired, despite having recorded 20 points in 19 games.

== International play ==
Medal record

Representing Latvia

Men's ice hockey

World Championships
Bronze medal – third place	2023 Finland/Latvia	

Daugaviņš represented Latvia as its captain at the 2023 IIHF World Championship where he recorded three goals and four assists and won a bronze medal, Latvia's first ever IIHF World Championship medal. Daugaviņš has served as the teams captain at every World Championship he's played at since, as well as for the 2026 Winter Olympics.

== Career statistics ==
=== Regular season and playoffs ===
			Regular season					Playoffs
Season	Team	League	GP	G	A	Pts	PIM	GP	G	A	Pts	PIM
2003–04	Riga 2000	EEHL	2	0	1	1	0	—	—	—	—	—
2003–04	Prizma/Riga 86	LAT	14	6	6	12	10	2	1	1	2	4
2003–04	Riga 2000	LAT U18		22	28	50		—	—	—	—	—
2004–05	CSKA–2 Moscow	RUS.3	25	0	3	3	4	—	—	—	—	—
2005–06	Riga 2000	BLR	45	4	11	15	16	4	0	0	0	0
2006–07	Toronto St. Michael's Majors	OHL	61	18	42	60	64	—	—	—	—	—
2006–07	Binghamton Senators	AHL	11	2	0	2	9	—	—	—	—	—
2007–08	Mississauga St. Michael's Majors	OHL	62	40	34	74	42	4	2	1	3	4
2007–08	Binghamton Senators	AHL	3	0	1	1	0	—	—	—	—	—
2008–09	Mississauga St. Michael's Majors	OHL	30	11	17	28	35	11	2	7	9	14
2008–09	Binghamton Senators	AHL	23	2	1	3	9	—	—	—	—	—
2009–10	Binghamton Senators	AHL	72	21	25	46	16	—	—	—	—	—
2009–10	Ottawa Senators	NHL	1	0	0	0	0	—	—	—	—	—
2010–11	Binghamton Senators	AHL	73	19	35	54	34	23	10	10	20	8
2011–12	Binghamton Senators	AHL	7	4	2	6	0	—	—	—	—	—
2011–12	Ottawa Senators	NHL	65	5	6	11	12	1	0	0	0	0
2012–13	Dinamo Riga	KHL	35	5	9	14	26	—	—	—	—	—
2012–13	Ottawa Senators	NHL	19	1	2	3	9	—	—	—	—	—
2012–13	Boston Bruins	NHL	6	0	1	1	0	6	0	0	0	2
2013–14	Genève-Servette HC	NLA	44	18	26	44	24	12	5	8	13	2
2014–15	Dynamo Moscow	KHL	56	22	15	37	26	11	1	3	4	3
2015–16	Dynamo Moscow	KHL	8	1	3	4	2	—	—	—	—	—
2015–16	Torpedo Nizhny Novgorod	KHL	44	14	21	35	12	11	3	2	5	25
2016–17	Torpedo Nizhny Novgorod	KHL	47	10	22	32	41	4	1	2	3	2
2017–18	Torpedo Nizhny Novgorod	KHL	56	11	16	27	18	4	0	2	2	0
2018–19	Spartak Moscow	KHL	58	13	23	36	61	2	0	1	1	0
2019–20	Spartak Moscow	KHL	59	19	21	40	22	6	1	3	4	2
2020–21	Vityaz Podolsk	KHL	58	17	32	49	38	—	—	—	—	—
2021–22	SC Bern	NL	34	10	15	25	14	—	—	—	—	—
2022–23	Iserlohn Roosters	DEL	55	21	28	49	14	—	—	—	—	—
2023–24	Dukla Michalovce	Slovak	47	11	43	54	20	11	5	6	11	2
2024–25	Dukla Michalovce	Slovak	19	6	14	20	24	—	—	—	—	—
2025–26	HK Mogo	LAT	12	4	17	21	6	—	—	—	—	—
2025-26	EC Kassel Huskies	DEL2	22	3	6	9	4	8	1	3	4	0
NHL totals			91	6	9	15	21	7	0	0	0	2
KHL totals			421	112	162	274	246	38	6	13	19	35

=== International ===
Bold indicates led tournament

Year	Team	Event	Result	GP	G	A	Pts	PIM
2004	Latvia	WJC18 D1	4th	5	0	2	2	8
2005	Latvia	WJC18 D1	2nd	5	2	1	3	18
2006	Latvia	WJC	9th	6	0	2	2	4
2006	Latvia	WJC18 D1	1st	5	5	4	9	20
2006	Latvia	WC	10th	3	0	1	1	2
2007	Latvia	WJC D1	2nd	5	3	7	**10**	2
2007	Latvia	WC	13th	6	3	3	6	0
2008	Latvia	WJC D1	1st	5	2	**8**	10	4
2008	Latvia	WC	11th	6	0	0	0	0
2010	Latvia	OG	12th	4	0	0	0	2
2010	Latvia	WC	11th	6	2	1	3	0
2012	Latvia	WC	10th	7	1	1	2	8
2014	Latvia	OG	8th	4	0	2	2	0
2014	Latvia	WC	11th	7	2	3	5	**42**
2015	Latvia	WC	13th	7	5	4	9	4
2016	Latvia	WC	13th	7	2	2	4	0
2016	Latvia	OGQ	2nd	3	2	3	5	2
2017	Latvia	WC	DNQ	7	1	2	3	2
2021	Latvia	WC	11th	5	0	1	1	4
2021	Latvia	OGQ	Q	3	1	1	2	2
2022	Latvia	OG	11th	4	0	0	0	2
2023	Latvia	WC	3rd place, bronze medalist(s)	10	3	4	7	10
2024	Latvia	WC	9th	7	4	3	7	0
2024	Latvia	OGQ	Q	3	0	4	4	0
2025	Latvia	WC	10th	7	0	1	1	4
2026	Latvia	OG	10th	4	0	1	1	2
Junior totals				31	12	24	36	56
Senior totals				100	26	36	62	84

== Awards and honours ==
Award	Year	Ref
OHL
All-Rookie Team	2006–07	
AHL
Calder Cup champion	2011	
Spengler Cup
Spengler Cup champion	2013	
All-Star Team	2013	
International
World Championship Top 3 Player on Team	2014, 2015, 2023, 2024	
KHL
All-Star Game	2016	
