= Niklas Kronwall =

Swedish ice hockey player (born 1981)

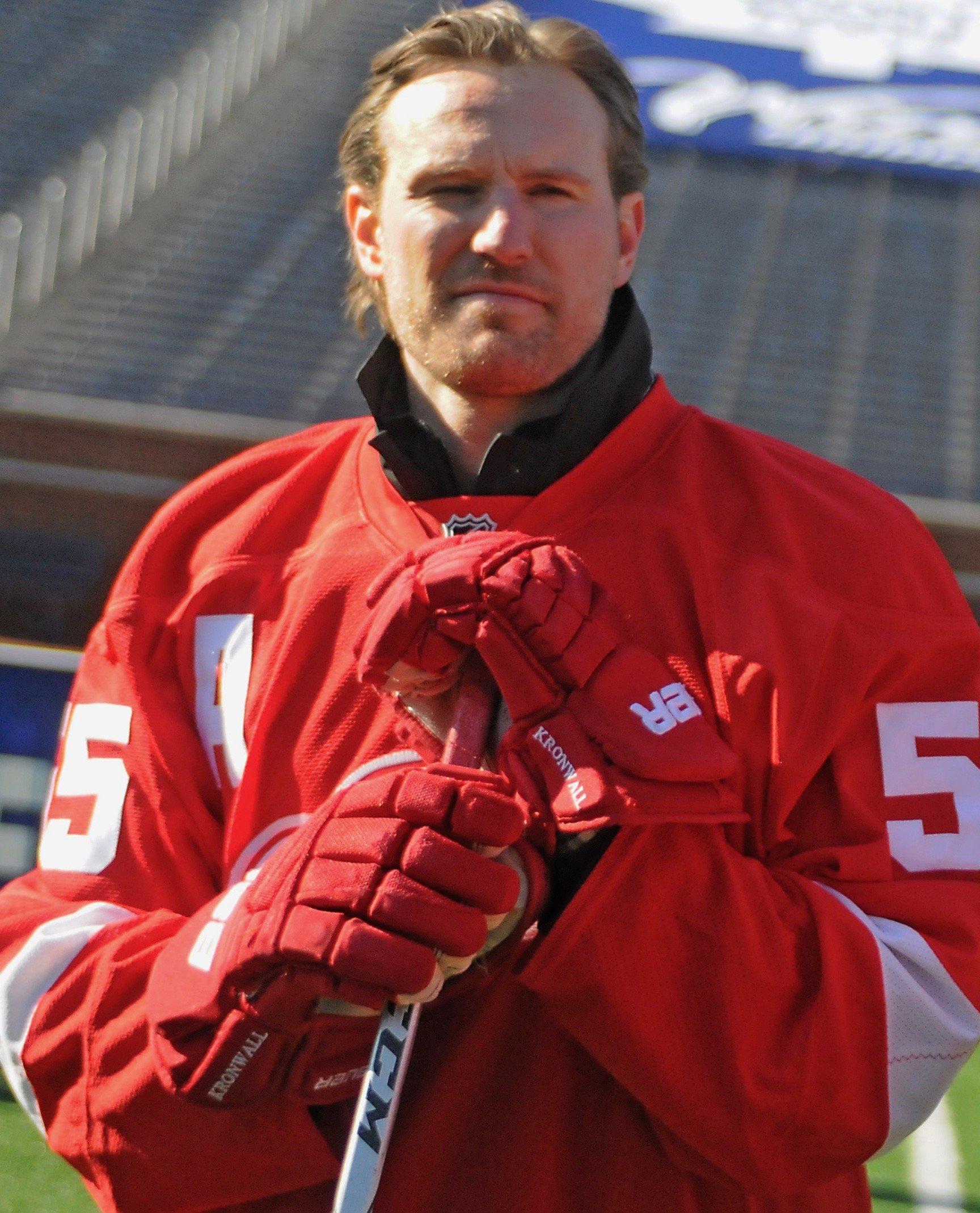
- Kronwall with the Detroit Red Wings in 2012
- Born: 12 January 1981 (age 45) Stockholm, Sweden
- Height: 6 ft 0 in (183 cm)
- Weight: 194 lb (88 kg; 13 st 12 lb)
- Position: Defence
- Shot: Left
- Played for: Djurgårdens IF; Detroit Red Wings
- National team: Sweden
- NHL draft: 29th overall, 2000; Detroit Red Wings
- Playing career: 1999–2019

Hans Niklas Kronwall (pronounced [ˈnɪ̌kːlas ˈkrûːnval]; born 12 January 1981) is a Swedish former professional ice hockey defenceman, who currently serves as an advisor to the general manager of the Detroit Red Wings. He previously played for the Red Wings of the National Hockey League (NHL). He is one of the 30 members in the Triple Gold Club. Kronwall started his career in Järfälla HC in Sweden, and has played internationally for Sweden. In the NHL, Kronwall gained notoriety for being an open ice hitter, and the phrase "being Kronwalled" was coined to describe his signature back-pedaling hits. In 2008, he won the Stanley Cup with the Red Wings. He was inducted into the IIHF Hall of Fame in 2026.

== Playing career ==
I know one scout who tried to bring up Niklas Kronwall's name with his team. They just laughed at him. They never even had a serious dialogue. They just stopped him. They said 'a 5-11 Swedish defenceman?' [The Red Wings] organization is more open-minded than that.

— Håkan Andersson, Director of European Scouting for the Detroit Red Wings,

Kronwall was selected in the first round, 29th overall, in the 2000 NHL entry draft by the Detroit Red Wings. He continued to play for Djurgårdens IF until he came to North America in 2003. He played 20 games for Detroit in the 2003–04 season, scoring one goal and four assists for five points, to go along with 16 penalty minutes.

During the 2004–05 NHL lockout, Kronwall played a complete season for the Grand Rapids Griffins, the Red Wings' top affiliate in the American Hockey League (AHL). He notched 13 goals and 40 assists in 76 games while also playing a solid defense. For his efforts, Kronwall was awarded the Eddie Shore Award as the top defenceman in the AHL.

Kronwall was injured in an exhibition game against the Colorado Avalanche in September 2005 and missed more than half of the 2005–06 season with a serious knee injury.

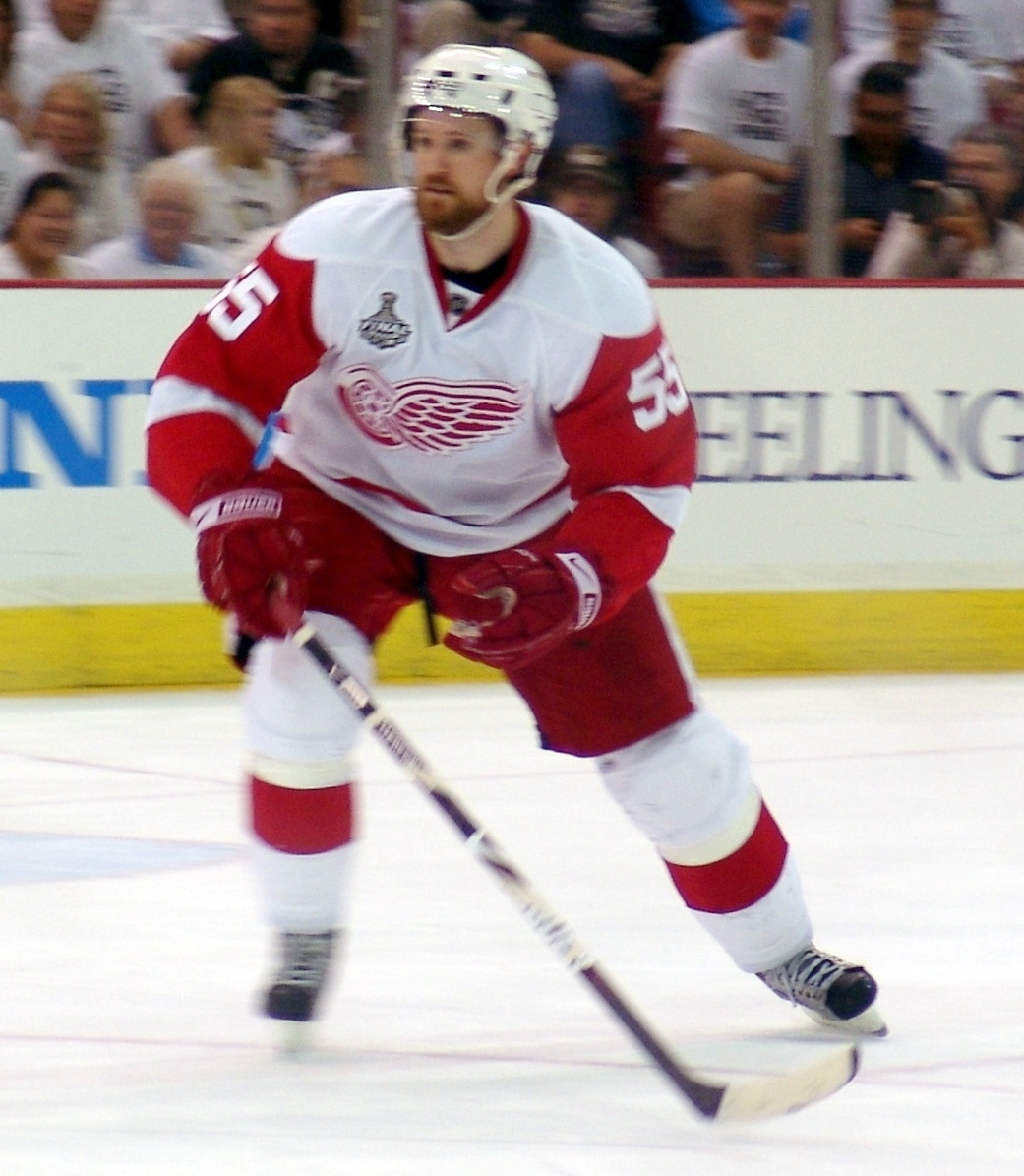
Kronwall in 2009 Stanley Cup Final game six.

Kronwall won the Stanley Cup with the Red Wings in 2008, making him a member of the Triple Gold Club. He also led all defencemen in scoring with 15 points in the 2008 Stanley Cup playoffs. Kronwall scored six goals to go with 45 assists during the 2008–09 season, and followed it up with two goals and seven assists during the 2009 Stanley Cup playoffs as the Red Wings came within a game of repeating as Stanley Cup champions. The Red Wings lost game seven at home by a score of 2-1, with Kronwall hitting the crossbar with 2:15 remaining in the third period, which would've tied the game.

On 27 December 2010, Kronwall helped teammate and goaltender Chris Osgood get his 400th win by scoring the game-winning goal and lifting the Red Wings to a 4–3 overtime win over the Colorado Avalanche.

On 31 October 2011, Kronwall and Detroit agreed to a seven-year contract. Playing in all 82 regular season games during the 2011–12 season, Kronwall recorded a career high 15 goals for the Red Wings.

Upon the retirement of veteran defenseman Nicklas Lidström in 2012, Kronwall became Detroit's number one defenseman. During the lockout shortened 2012–13 season, Kronwall appeared in all 48 regular season games, usually paired with fellow Swede Jonathan Ericsson. Kronwall finished the regular season scoring five goals along with 24 assists as the Red Wings clinched their 22nd consecutive playoff berth.

During the 2013–14 season, Kronwall recorded eight goals and 41 assists in 79 games for the Red Wings. He became the fifth defensemen to lead the Red Wings in assists in a single season, joining Reed Larson, Brad Park, Paul Coffey and Nicklas Lidström.

On 3 December 2015, Kronwall played in his 700th career NHL game with the Red Wings, becoming the sixth defenceman in franchise history to reach the plateau, following Nicklas Lidström, Marcel Pronovost, Red Kelly, Reed Larson and Gary Bergman.

On 19 January 2016, Kronwall underwent arthroscopic knee surgery, and was out for two to four weeks. During the 2015–16 season, Kronwall recorded three goals and 14 assists in 45 games this season.

Kronwall missed the beginning of training camp for the 2016–17 NHL season due to him recovering from an injury endured in the offseason. Kronwall made his season debut on 4 November 2016 in a 5–3 loss to the Winnipeg Jets. He ended the season with his fewest points totals since the 2005-06 season.

During the 2017–18 season Kronwall hit many personal milestones. He played in his 800th career NHL game against the Washington Capitals on 20 October 2017 and recorded his 400th point in a 5–2 win over the Pittsburgh Penguins on 27 March 2018.

On 3 September 2019, Kronwall announced his retirement from ice hockey. He finished his career ranked third all-time in games played by a defenseman and fourth in points in franchise history, trailing only Nicklas Lidström, Reed Larson and Red Kelly.

== Post-playing career ==
Following his retirement, Kronwall was named an advisor to the general manager for the Red Wings.

== International play ==
Medal record

Representing Sweden

Ice hockey

Olympic Games
Gold medal – first place	2006 Turin	
Silver medal – second place	2014 Sochi	

World Championships
Gold medal – first place	2006 Latvia	
Silver medal – second place	2003 Finland	

In late 2005, Kronwall was named member of the Swedish Olympic Team but dropped out in early 2006 because of his injured knee. When Mattias Öhlund was injured against Switzerland, Kronwall was called in to replace him.

Kronwall represented Sweden at the 2006 Winter Olympics in Turin, where he recorded one goal and one assist in two games, and won a gold medal. That same year, Kronwall represented Sweden at the 2006 IIHF World Championship, where he was the leading scorer for Sweden, recording two goals and eight assists in eight games and won a gold medal. Sweden became the first team in hockey history to win the Olympic gold and the World Championship in the same year.

With the 2008 Stanley Cup championship, Kronwall became a member of the Triple Gold Club. The term is used for an exclusive group of ice hockey players who have won Olympic gold, World Championship gold and the Stanley Cup. Kronwall, along with teammates and fellow Swedes Mikael Samuelsson and Henrik Zetterberg, are the fastest to accomplish this feat, requiring only two years, three months and ten days.

Kronwall represented Sweden at the 2014 Winter Olympics in Sochi, where he recorded two assists in six games, and won a silver medal.

== "Kronwalled" ==
Kronwall has developed a reputation for his signature back-pedaling hits. Fans refer to the frequently devastating, often open-ice, hits as being "Kronwalled." Victims of Kronwall's checking include Anders Lee, Dany Heatley, Auston Matthews, Aleš Hemský, Artturi Lehkonen, Reilly Smith, Ryan Kesler, Martin Havlát, Jakub Voráček and Kaspars Saulietis. On-ice officials sometimes deemed these hits illegal; of these individuals, the hits on Matthews, Hemský, and Havlát resulted in penalties. The hit on Havlát in particular resulted in Kronwall being ejected. On 27 April 2015, during game six of a first round playoff, Kronwall "Kronwalled" Tampa Bay Lightning forward Nikita Kucherov. The following day, the NHL Department of Player Safety suspended Kronwall for the final game of the series, which the Red Wings lost 2-0.

== Personal life ==
His younger brother Staffan also played professionally in the NHL before ending his career in the Kontinental Hockey League (KHL).

In April 2014, Kronwall's girlfriend gave birth to their first child.

== Career statistics ==
=== Regular season and playoffs ===
			Regular season					Playoffs
Season	Team	League	GP	G	A	Pts	PIM	GP	G	A	Pts	PIM
1996–97	Djurgårdens IF	J20	1	0	0	0	2	—	—	—	—	—
1997–98	Djurgårdens IF	J20	27	4	3	7	71	2	0	0	0	2
1998–99	Huddinge IK	Div.1	25	1	1	2	24	—	—	—	—	—
1999–2000	Djurgårdens IF	SEL	37	1	4	5	16	8	0	0	0	8
2000–01	Djurgårdens IF	SEL	31	1	9	10	32	15	0	1	1	8
2001–02	Djurgårdens IF	SEL	48	5	7	12	34	5	0	0	0	0
2002–03	Djurgårdens IF	SEL	50	5	13	18	46	12	3	2	5	18
2003–04	Detroit Red Wings	NHL	20	1	4	5	16	—	—	—	—	—
2003–04	Grand Rapids Griffins	AHL	25	2	11	13	20	—	—	—	—	—
2004–05	Grand Rapids Griffins	AHL	76	13	40	53	53	—	—	—	—	—
2005–06	Detroit Red Wings	NHL	27	1	8	9	28	6	0	3	3	2
2005–06	Grand Rapids Griffins	AHL	1	0	0	0	0	—	—	—	—	—
2006–07	Detroit Red Wings	NHL	68	1	21	22	54	—	—	—	—	—
2007–08	Detroit Red Wings	NHL	65	7	28	35	25	22	0	15	15	18
2008–09	Detroit Red Wings	NHL	80	6	45	51	50	23	2	7	9	33
2009–10	Detroit Red Wings	NHL	48	7	15	22	32	12	0	5	5	12
2010–11	Detroit Red Wings	NHL	77	11	26	37	36	11	2	4	6	8
2011–12	Detroit Red Wings	NHL	82	15	21	36	38	5	0	2	2	4
2012–13	Detroit Red Wings	NHL	48	5	24	29	44	14	0	2	2	4
2013–14	Detroit Red Wings	NHL	79	8	41	49	44	5	1	1	2	0
2014–15	Detroit Red Wings	NHL	80	9	35	44	40	6	0	2	2	4
2015–16	Detroit Red Wings	NHL	64	3	23	26	30	5	0	1	1	8
2016–17	Detroit Red Wings	NHL	57	2	11	13	32	—	—	—	—	—
2017–18	Detroit Red Wings	NHL	79	4	23	27	36	—	—	—	—	—
2018–19	Detroit Red Wings	NHL	79	3	24	27	40	—	—	—	—	—
SEL totals			166	12	33	45	128	35	3	3	6	34
NHL totals			953	83	349	432	564	109	5	42	47	89

=== International ===
Year	Team	Event	Result	GP	G	A	Pts	PIM
1998	Sweden	EJC	1st place, gold medalist(s)	6	1	2	3	6
1999	Sweden	WJC18	2nd place, silver medalist(s)	7	0	4	4	10
2000	Sweden	WJC	5th	7	5	1	6	10
2001	Sweden	WJC	4th	5	0	1	1	2
2003	Sweden	WC	2nd place, silver medalist(s)	5	0	0	0	4
2005	Sweden	WC	4th	9	3	3	6	10
2006	Sweden	OG	1st place, gold medalist(s)	2	1	1	2	8
2006	Sweden	WC	1st place, gold medalist(s)	8	2	8	10	10
2010	Sweden	OG	5th	4	0	0	0	2
2012	Sweden	WC	6th	8	1	0	1	4
2014	Sweden	OG	2nd place, silver medalist(s)	6	0	2	2	4
Junior totals				25	6	8	14	28
Senior totals				42	7	14	21	42

== Achievements ==
- Elitserien champion with Djurgårdens IF in 2000 and 2001
- Elitserien Junior Hockey Player of the Year in 2001
- Silver medal at the World Championships in 2003
- Awarded the Eddie Shore Award (Outstanding defenceman) in 2005
- Named to the AHL First All-Star Team in 2005
- Gold medal at the Winter Olympics in 2006
- Gold medal at the World Championships in 2006
- Named MVP and Best Defender in World Championships in 2006
- Named to the World Championship All-Star Team in 2006
- Stanley Cup with the Detroit Red Wings in 2008
- Silver medal at the Winter Olympics in 2014
- Inducted into the IIHF Hall of Fame in 2026

Preceded by Jiri Fischer	Detroit Red Wings first-round draft pick 2000	Succeeded by Jakub Kindl
