= Baltic Cup =

Baltic Cup may refer to:

- Baltic Cup (figure skating)
- Baltic Cup (football)
  - U21 Baltic Cup
  - U19 Baltic Cup
  - U17 Baltic Cup
  - Women's Baltic Cup
  - Women's U-19 Baltic Cup
  - Women's U-17 Baltic Cup
  - Women's U-15 Baltic Cup
- Baltic Futsal Cup
- Baltic Cup (ice hockey)
- Baltic Cup (chess)
- Baltic Cup (cricket)
- Baltic Cup (draughts)
- Baltic Cup (racing)
- Baltic Champions Cup

== See also ==
- Baltic League (disambiguation)
