= 2020–21 IIHF Continental Cup =

2020–2021 IIHF Continental Cup
Tournament details
- Dates: 16 October 2020 – 10 January 2021 (Cancelled)
- Teams: 20

The 2020–21 Continental Cup would have been the 24th edition of the IIHF Continental Cup, Europe's second-tier ice hockey club competition organised by International Ice Hockey Federation. The season was scheduled to begin on 16 October 2020 and the final tournament was scheduled to be played from 8 to 10 January 2021.

The IIHF Council cancelled the tournament during the video conference meeting on 24 August 2020 due to the ongoing COVID-19 pandemic.

== Format ==
Due to the delayed start of the hockey season in many countries due to the COVID-19 pandemic the tournament was about to have different format, consisting of the qualifying round, group stage and final round. In the qualifying round, 8 qualified teams are divided into two groups. The top two teams of each group advance to the group stage. In the group stage, 16 qualified teams and 4 teams that proceeded from the qualifying round are divided into four groups. The winners of each group advance to the final round.

== Qualified teams ==
Team	Qualification
Enter in the group stage
(Belarus) Shakhtyor Soligorsk	2019–20 Belarusian Extraleague regular season third place
(Denmark) Frederikshavn White Hawks	2019–20 Danish Cup winners
(France) Gothiques d'Amiens	2019–20 Coupe de France winners
(United Kingdom) Sheffield Steelers	2019–20 EIHL season second place
(Kazakhstan) Yertis Pavlodar (withdrew from the competition, was replaced by Altai Torpedo Ust-Kamenogorsk)	2019–20 Kazakhstan Hockey Championship regular season runners-up
(Poland) Unia Oświęcim	2019–20 Polska Hokej Liga regular season runners-up
(Hungary) Ferencvárosi TC (withdrew from the competition)	2019–20 OB I bajnokság champions
(Italy) Asiago Hockey	2019–20 IHL - Elite champions
(Latvia) Olimp/Venta	2019–20 Latvian Hockey Higher League champions
(Romania) Csíkszereda	2019–20 Romanian Hockey League champions
(Slovenia) Olimpija	2019–20 Slovenian Ice Hockey League champions
Kremenchuk	2019–20 Ukrainian Hockey League champions
Enter in the qualifying round
(Lithuania) Kaunas Hockey	2019–20 Lithuania Hockey League regular season winners (abandoned)
(Spain) FC Barcelona	2019–20 Liga Nacional de Hockey Hielo regular season winners
(Iceland) Skautafélag Akureyrar	2019–20 Icelandic Hockey League champions
(Israel) HC Bat Yam	2019–20 Israeli Hockey League champions
(Serbia) Crvena Zvezda	2019–20 Serbian Hockey League champions
(Croatia) KHL Mladost	2019–20 Croatian Ice Hockey League champions
(Turkey) Buz Beykoz SK	2019–20 Turkish Ice Hockey Super League champions
(Bulgaria) Irbis-Skate Sofia	2019–20 Bulgarian Hockey League champions

== Qualifying round ==
=== Group A ===
The Group A tournament was scheduled to be played in Akureyri, Iceland, from 16 to 18 October 2020.

Pos	Team	Pld	W	OTW	OTL	L	GF	GA	GD	Pts	Qualification
1	(Lithuania) Kaunas Hockey	0	0	0	0	0	0	0	0	0	Group stage
2	(Spain) FC Barcelona	0	0	0	0	0	0	0	0	0	Group stage
3	(Iceland) Skautafélag Akureyrar (H)	0	0	0	0	0	0	0	0	0	
4	(Israel) HC Bat Yam	0	0	0	0	0	0	0	0	0	

Updated to match(es) played on unknown. Source:
(H) Host

=== Group B ===
The Group A tournament was scheduled to be played in Sofia, Bulgaria, from 16 to 18 October 2020.

Pos	Team	Pld	W	OTW	OTL	L	GF	GA	GD	Pts	Qualification
1	(Serbia) Crvena Zvezda	0	0	0	0	0	0	0	0	0	Group stage
2	(Croatia) KHL Mladost	0	0	0	0	0	0	0	0	0	Group stage
3	(Turkey) Buz Beykoz SK	0	0	0	0	0	0	0	0	0	
4	(Bulgaria) Irbis-Skate Sofia (H)	0	0	0	0	0	0	0	0	0	

Updated to match(es) played on unknown. Source:
(H) Host

== Group stage ==
=== Group C ===
The Group C tournament was scheduled to be played in Amiens, France, from 13 to 15 November 2020.

Pos	Team	Pld	W	OTW	OTL	L	GF	GA	GD	Pts	Qualification
1	(Kazakhstan) Yertis Pavlodar	0	0	0	0	0	0	0	0	0	Final round
2	(France) Gothiques d'Amiens (H)	0	0	0	0	0	0	0	0	0	
3	(Hungary) Ferencvárosi TC	0	0	0	0	0	0	0	0	0	
4	Group B 2nd place	0	0	0	0	0	0	0	0	0	

Updated to match(es) played on unknown. Source:
(H) Host

=== Group D ===
The Group D tournament was scheduled to be played in Asiago, Italy, from 13 to 15 November 2020.

Pos	Team	Pld	W	OTW	OTL	L	GF	GA	GD	Pts	Qualification
1	(United Kingdom) Sheffield Steelers	0	0	0	0	0	0	0	0	0	Final round
2	(Italy) Asiago Hockey (H)	0	0	0	0	0	0	0	0	0	
3	(Ukraine) TBD	0	0	0	0	0	0	0	0	0	
4	Group A 2nd place	0	0	0	0	0	0	0	0	0	

Updated to match(es) played on unknown. Source:
(H) Host

=== Group E ===
The Group E tournament was scheduled to be played in Ljubljana, Slovenia, from 13 to 15 November 2020.

Pos	Team	Pld	W	OTW	OTL	L	GF	GA	GD	Pts	Qualification
1	(Belarus) Shakhtyor Soligorsk	0	0	0	0	0	0	0	0	0	Final round
2	(Latvia) Olimp/Venta	0	0	0	0	0	0	0	0	0	
3	(Slovenia) Olimpija (H)	0	0	0	0	0	0	0	0	0	
4	Group B 1st place	0	0	0	0	0	0	0	0	0	

Updated to match(es) played on unknown. Source:
(H) Host

=== Group F ===
The Group F tournament was scheduled to be played in Frederikshavn, Denmark, from 13 to 15 November 2020.

Pos	Team	Pld	W	OTW	OTL	L	GF	GA	GD	Pts	Qualification
1	(Poland) Unia Oświęcim	0	0	0	0	0	0	0	0	0	Final round
2	(Denmark) Frederikshavn White Hawks (H)	0	0	0	0	0	0	0	0	0	
3	(Romania) Csíkszereda	0	0	0	0	0	0	0	0	0	
4	Group A 1st place	0	0	0	0	0	0	0	0	0	

Updated to match(es) played on unknown. Source:
(H) Host

== Final round ==
Continental Cup final tournament was scheduled to be played from 8 to 10 January 2021.

Pos	Team	Pld	W	OTW	OTL	L	GF	GA	GD	Pts	Qualification
1	Group C 1st place	0	0	0	0	0	0	0	0	0	Champions Hockey League
2	Group D 1st place	0	0	0	0	0	0	0	0	0	
3	Group E 1st place	0	0	0	0	0	0	0	0	0	
4	Group F 1st place	0	0	0	0	0	0	0	0	0	

== See also ==
- 2020–21 Champions Hockey League
