= Kaunas Hockey =

Ice hockey team in Kaunas, Lithuania

- City: Kaunas, Lithuania
- League: Lithuania Hockey League
- Founded: 2017
- Folded: 2021
- Home arena: Kaunas Ice Arena (capacity: 300)
- Colours: Green, light green, black, white
- Head coach: Petras Nausėda

Kaunas Hockey is a professional ice hockey team located in Kaunas, Lithuania, which plays in the Lithuania Hockey League, the top tier of ice hockey in Lithuania. They play home games at the Kaunas Ice Arena.

== History ==
Hockey Kaunas was founded in 2017, with the purpose of helping to improve the standard of Lithuanian hockey with the ultimate goal of seeing the Lithuanian national team compete in the Winter Olympics. One of the team's initial investors was TeleSoftas, a Kaunas-based software company. Following their formation, Hockey Kaunas immediately began play in the Lithuania Hockey League. Their first season was a productive one, making it to the playoff finals, before ultimately losing to SC Energija.

In 2020 Kaunas Hockey took part in the inaugural Baltic Hockey League, a competition made up of two teams from each of Estonia, Latvia and Lithuania. The team finished last in their group after suffering heavy losses against both Tartu Välk 949 of Estonia, and Latvian side HK Mogo. As a result, they did not progress to the final round. In addition, as a result of being in first place of the NLRL when the remainder of games were cancelled due to the COVID-19 pandemic, Kaunas Hockey also qualified for the 2020–21 IIHF Continental Cup where they were scheduled to face-off against Skautafelag Akureyrar of Iceland, Israeli team HC Bat Yam and Spanish outfit FC Barcelona. However, two months later, the IIHF cancelled the Continental Cup due to the Pandemic.

== Roster ==
Updated January 24, 2021.

Goaltenders
Number		Player	Catches	Acquired	Place of Birth
95	(Russia)	Pavel Davydyuk	L	2020	Saint Petersburg, Russia
1	(Lithuania)	Daniel Jankovskij	R	2019	-
30	(Lithuania)	Artur Pavliukov	L	2018	Klaipėda, Lithuania

Defencemen
Number		Player	Shoots	Acquired	Place of Birth
88	(Lithuania)	Vasilijus Fedotovas	L	2019	Rokiškis, Lithuania
19	(Lithuania)	Žygimantas Girdžius	L	2017	Kaunas, Lithuania
22	(Lithuania)	Povilas Jagelavicius	L	2017	Kaunas, Lithuania
76	(Lithuania)	Vėjas Jokubynas	R	2020	Vilnius, Lithuania
55	(Russia)	Ilya Malashkevich	L	2020	Moscow, Russia
97	(Belarus)	Yegor Rublyov	R	2020	Gomel, Belarus
47	(Lithuania)	Artiom Starovoitov	L	2020	-
71	(Russia)	Alexander Strokin	L	2020	-

Forwards
Number		Player	Shoots	Position	Acquired	Place of Birth
33	(Lithuania)	Rojus Adamonis	L	F	2020	Kaunas, Lithuania
69	(Lithuania)	Nojus Asmonas	L	F	2020	-
14	(Lithuania)	Egidijus Binkulis	L	C	2020	Elektrėnai, Lithuania
46	(Russia)	Eduard Chekmaryov	R	F	2019	Yekaterinburg, Russia
17	(Belarus)	Kirill Danilenko	L	F	2019	Gomel, Belarus
16	(Lithuania)	Remigijus Guoga	L	F	2017	Kaunas, Lithuania
27	(Lithuania)	Vytautas Jagelavičius	L	LW/RW	2017	Elektrėnai, Lithuania
89	(Lithuania)	Dovydas Laimutis	L	R	2020	-
29	(Russia)	Pavel Pravilo	L	F	2020	Petropavlovsk-Kamchatsky, Russia
18	(Russia)	Roman Reshetnikov	-	F	2020	-
15	(Russia)	Anton Sharpanskikh	L	C	2020	Nizhny Tagil, Russia
91	(Russia)	Grigori Vorobyov	L	LW	2019	Tyumen, Russia
13	(Lithuania)	Lukas Zukauskas	L	F	2018	Jonava, Lithuania

== Season-by-season record ==
Note: GP = Games played, W = Wins, L = Losses, T = Ties, OTL = Overtime losses, Pts = Points, GF = Goals for, GA = Goals against, PIM = Penalties in minutes

Season	GP	W	L	T	OTW	OTL	Pts	GF	GA	Finish	Playoffs
2017–18	20	12	5	—	2	1	41	96	80	2nd	Final loss
2018–19	18	10	5	—	2	1	35	74	35	2nd	Semi-final loss
2019–20	18	12	1	—	3	2	44	115	51	1st	Playoffs cancelled

== Team records ==
=== Career ===
These are the top five scorers in Kaunas Hockey history.

Note: Pos = Position; GP = Games played; G = Goals; A = Assists; Pts = Points

Player	Pos	GP	G	A	Pts
Eduard Chekmaryov	F	30	36	33	69
Lukas Zukauskas	F	30	18	35	53
Remigijus Guoga	F	54	24	22	46
Vytautas Jagelavičius	F	65	23	22	45
Dovydas Streckis	F	34	15	22	37

Penalty minutes: Vasilijus Fedotovas, 135

=== Season ===
==== Regular season ====
- Most goals in a season: Eduard Chekmaryov, 27 (2019–20)
- Most assists in a season: Lukas Zukauskas, 24 (2019–20)
- Most points in a season: Eduard Chekmaryov, 50 (2019–20)
- Most penalty minutes in a season: Jon Stephansson, 90 (2018–19)

==== Playoffs ====
- Most goals in a playoff season: Eduard Chekmaryov, 9 (2019–20)
- Most assists in a playoff season: Lukas Zukauskas, 7 (2019–20)
- Most points in a playoff season: Eduard Chekmaryov, 14 (2019–20)
- Most penalty minutes in a playoff season: Vasilijus Fedotovas, 10 (2019–20)
