= Andris Siksnis =

Latvian ice hockey player

- Born: 6 May 1993 (age 33) Riga, Latvia
- Height: 180 cm (5 ft 11 in)
- Weight: 87 kg (192 lb; 13 st 10 lb)
- Position: Forward
- Shot: Left
- Played for: HK Riga; Dinamo Riga; EHC Lustenau; RoKi; HK Mogo
- Playing career: 2013–2022

Andris Siksnis (born 6 May 1993) is a Latvian former ice hockey forward. He played four games in the Kontinental Hockey League (KHL) for Dinamo Riga in the 2013–14 season. Most of his career was spent with HK Mogo in the Latvian Hockey Higher League, and he was a member of the team that won the Latvian championship in 2019.

== Playing career ==
Siksnis began his hockey career playing in minor and junior Latvian hockey leagues. In the 2011–12 season he played for Dinamo Juniors in the Latvian championship. He also made 24 appearances for HK Riga in the junior Minor Hockey League (MHL).

At the beginning of the 2013–14 season, Siksnis was called up to Dinamo Riga. He made his KHL debut on 21 September 2013 in a 6–1 home win against Vityaz. He played four KHL games for the club.

Siksnis started the 2014–15 season with Prizma, playing nine games in the Latvian championship. In November 2014 he moved to the Austrian club EHC Lustenau as an import player. He scored four goals and eight assists in 11 playoff games as part of the team that won the 2014–15 Inter-National League title. In August 2015 Siksnis joined RoKi of Mestis, the second tier of Finnish ice hockey. He played 13 games for the club.

In November 2015 he returned to Latvia to play for HK Mogo in the Latvian Hockey Higher League. In 2018–19 he was one of the team's leading players and part of the Latvian championship-winning team. He scored 12 goals and 19 assists in 36 regular-season games, and two goals and three assists in ten playoff games. He was also part of the Mogo teams that won the Latvian Cup in 2015–16, 2016–17 and 2017–18. He played in the league's All-Star Game in 2016–17. His last recorded season was 2021–22, when he played 28 regular-season and six playoff games for Mogo.

=== International ===
Siksnis represented Latvia at the 2013 World Junior Ice Hockey Championships, playing six games.

== Personal life ==
In 2019 Siksnis was completing his studies in Baltic philology at the University of Latvia. He is the third generation of his family to be named Andris Siksnis, after his father and grandfather.
