= Lauris Bajaruns =

Latvian professional ice hockey player

- Born: 31 March 1989 (age 37) Ventspils, Soviet Union
- Height: 1.96 m (6 ft 5 in)
- Weight: 94 kg (207 lb; 14 st 11 lb)
- Position: Forward
- Shoots: Right
- team Former teams: Free agent SK LSPA/Riga; DHK Latgale; HK Liepājas Metalurgs; HC Kladno; Rungsted Seier Capital; HK Poprad; HC '05 Banská Bystrica; Aigles de Nice; Metallurg Zhlobin; HK Kurbads
- National team: Latvia
- Playing career: 2005–present

Lauris Bajaruns (born 31 March 1989) is a Latvian professional ice hockey player. He is currently a free agent having last played for HK Kurbads of the Latvian Hockey Higher League.

He participated at the 2015 IIHF World Championship for the Latvian national team.
