= Baltic League (ice hockey) =

Competition among the ice hockey clubs from Baltic countries

The Baltic League was an ice hockey league that existed for the 2000–01 season. The three Baltic countries, Latvia, Lithuania, and Estonia sent teams. The league was not repeated after the 2000–01 season, however, a Baltic Cup was played for the 2004–05 season.

== 2000–01 season ==
=== First round ===
Group A

	Club	GP	W	T	L	Goals	Pts
1.	(Latvia) HK Riga 2000	8	8	0	0	35:12	16
2.	(Estonia) Kohtla-Järve Central	8	3	1	4	32:33	7
3.	(Latvia) LB/Prizma Riga	8	0	1	7	17:39	1

Group B

- (Latvia) HK Liepājas Metalurgs – (Lithuania) SC Energija 5:3, 6:4

=== Final round ===
3rd place

- (Estonia) Kohtla-Järve Central – (Lithuania) SC Energija 3:3, 7:4

Final

- (Latvia) HK Liepājas Metalurgs – (Latvia) HK Riga 2000 0:1, 4:1, 1:0
