= Vilnis Straume =

Latvian footballer (1937–2019)

Vilnis Straume (20 January 1937 – 2 June 2019) was a Latvian football player.

== Biography ==
In 1956, Straume joined Daugava Rīga - the club for which he played until the end of his footballer career. However, in 1957 he had to serve in the Soviet Army and also played with FK Dinamo Rīga with which he together with future Daugava players Georgijs Smirnovs and Georgijs Gusarenko won the Latvian Cup. Straume was a very hard working defender with one ambition - to play in the Soviet Top League. From 1960 to 1962 he achieved this ambition as Daugava competed in the Soviet Top League. From 1956 to 1966 he played in 308 matches with Daugava and scored one goal. Straume died on 2 June 2019, at the age of 82.
