= Latvian Cup (ice hockey) =

National ice hockey tournament held in Latvia

The Latvian Cup (Latvian: Latvijas kauss hokejā) was a national ice hockey cup competition in Latvia, the second after the Latvian Hockey Higher League. It was held in 1995, 1999, 2007, 2008 and from 2015 to 2018. HK Liepājas Metalurgs won three of the four cups contested.

The competition was once again discontinued after the 2017/18 edition.

== Champions ==
- 1995: Pārdaugava Rīga
- 1999: HK Liepājas Metalurgs
- 2007: HK Liepājas Metalurgs
- 2008: HK Liepājas Metalurgs
- 2015/16: HK Mogo
- 2016/17: HK Mogo
- 2017/18: HK Mogo
