= Miks Lipsbergs =

Latvian ice hockey player

- Born: June 9, 1991 (age 35) Riga, Latvian SSR, Soviet Union
- Height: 6 ft 3 in (191 cm)
- Weight: 178 lb (81 kg; 12 st 10 lb)
- Position: Forward
- team Former teams: Kiruna IF; SK LSPA/Riga; HK Riga; Dinamo Riga; HK Mogo; Lions de Lyon; Prizma Riga
- National team: Latvia
- Playing career: 2007–present

Miks Lipsbergs (born June 9, 1991) is a Latvian ice hockey forward who is currently playing for Kiruna IF (Sweden) having last played for HK Mogo of the Latvian Hockey Higher League.

Lipsberg previously played for Dinamo Riga of Kontinental Hockey League. He played for several Latvian league youth teams before joining HK Riga. His brothers Edgars Lipsbergs, Roberts Lipsbergs and Krišs Lipsbergs also are hockey players.

On September 8, 2012 he made his debut in shoot-out win against HC Slovan Bratislava.
