= Kārlis Ozoliņš (ice hockey) =

Latvian ice hockey player (born 1994)

- Born: March 16, 1994 (age 32) Riga, Latvia
- Height: 6 ft 0 in (183 cm)
- Weight: 172 lb (78 kg; 12 st 4 lb)
- Position: Winger
- Shoots: Right
- Latvia team Former teams: HK Mogo; Metalurgs Liepāja; HK Riga; HK Liepāja; Sollefteå HK; HK 32 Liptovský Mikuláš
- Playing career: 2010–present

Kārlis Ozoliņš (born March 16, 1994) is a Latvian ice hockey player.

== Playing career ==
Ozoliņš began his hockey career playing in minor and junior Latvian hockey leagues. During 2011–12 and 2012–13, seasons he played for HK Liepājas Metalurgs in the Latvian Hockey Higher League and Belarusian Extraleague. On August 21, 2013, Ozoliņš signed a contract with Dinamo Riga of the KHL.

=== International ===
Ozoliņš participated at the 2013 World Junior Ice Hockey Championships as a member of the Latvia men's national junior ice hockey team.

== Career statistics ==
=== Regular season and playoffs ===
			Regular season					Playoffs
Season	Team	League	GP	G	A	Pts	PIM	GP	G	A	Pts	PIM
2010–11	Liepājas Metalurgs-2	LHL	22	6	9	15	2	-	-	-	-	-
2011–12	Liepājas Metalurgs-2	LHL	31	14	21	35	14	7	1	1	2	2
2011–12	Liepājas Metalurgs	BXL	4	0	0	0	2	4	1	0	1	2
2012–13	Liepājas Metalurgs-3	LHL	1	2	4	6	0	1	0	0	0	0
2012–13	Liepājas Metalurgs	BXL	41	4	9	13	14	3	0	0	0	0
LHL totals			54	22	34	56	16	8	1	1	2	2
BXL totals			45	4	9	13	8	7	1	0	1	2

=== International ===
Year	Team	Comp	GP	G	A	Pts	PIM
2012	Latvia	WJC U18	6	0	1	1	2
2013	Latvia	WJC	6	1	0	1	0
Junior totals			29	3	5	8	10
