= Remetea, Harghita =

Remetea Gyergyóremete
- Commune
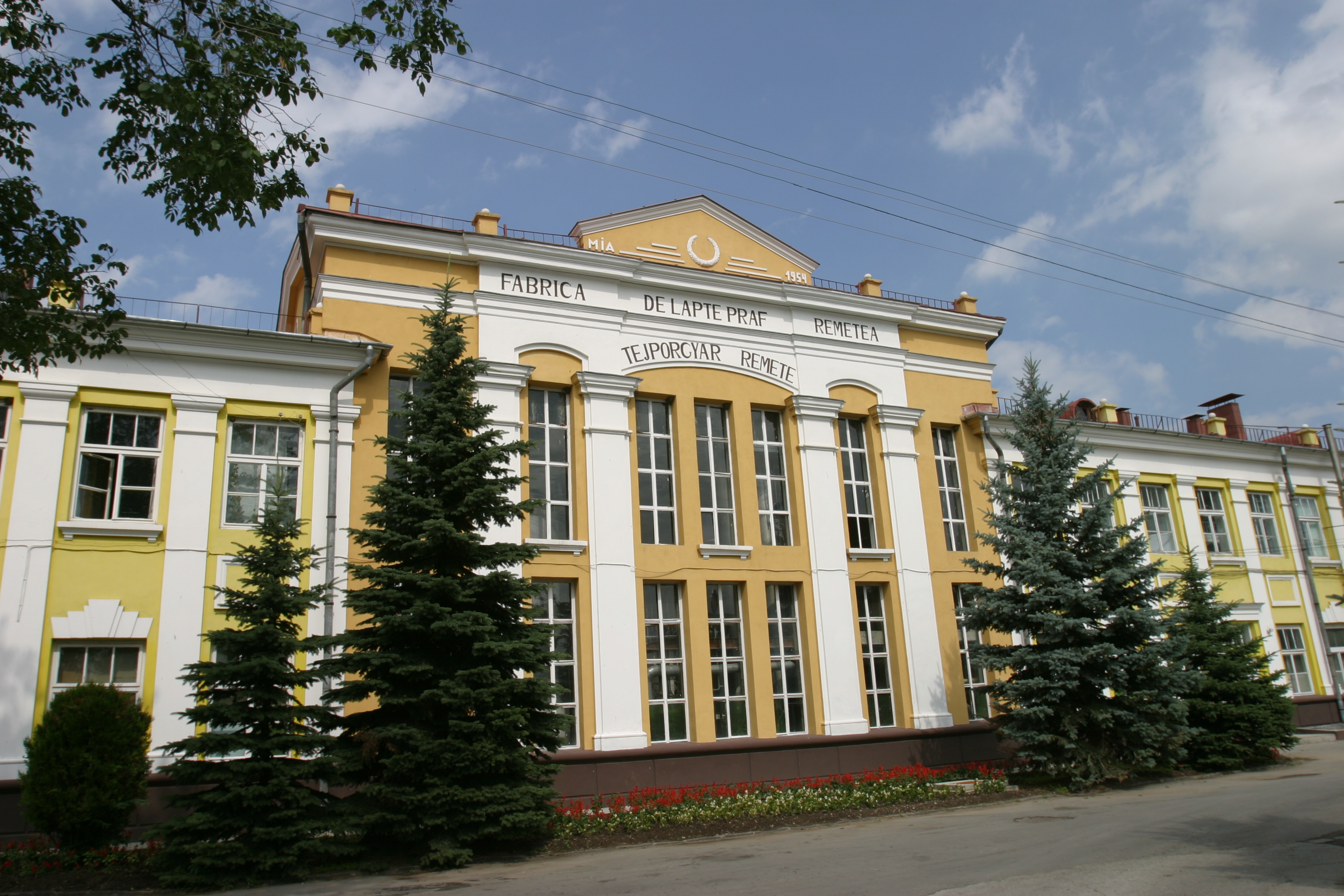
- Milk powder factory

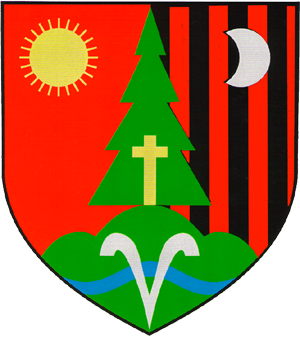
- Coat of arms

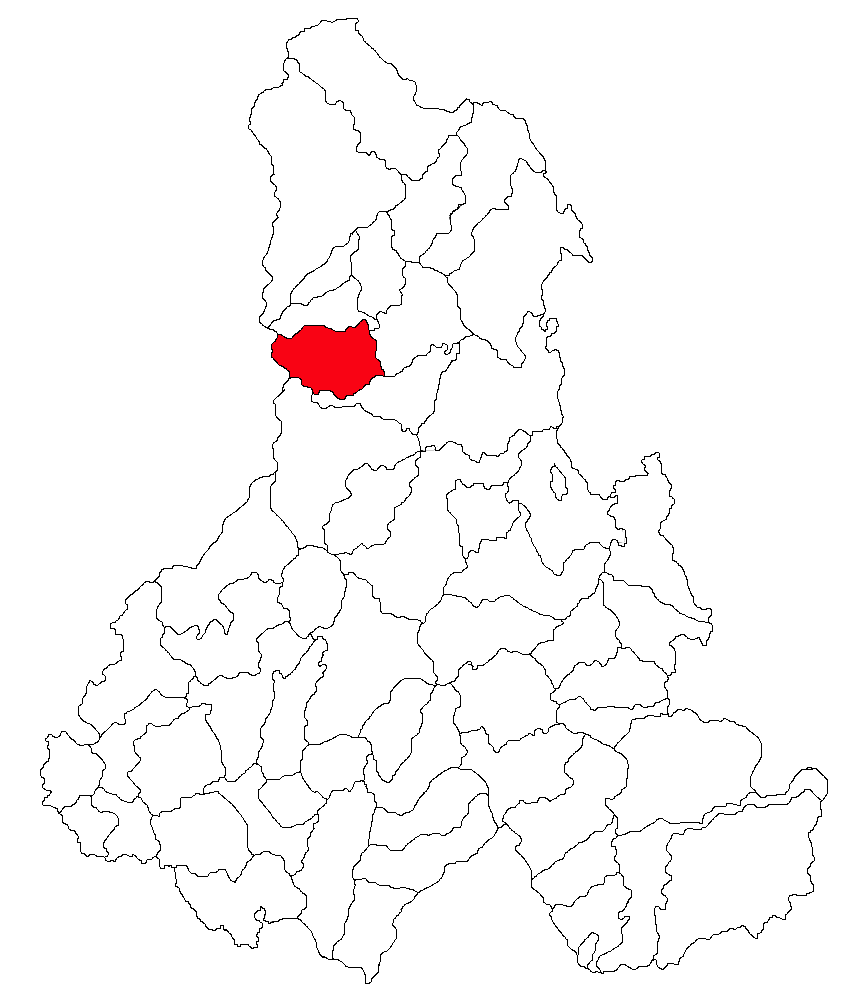
- Location in Harghita County

- Location in Romania
- Coordinates: 46°47′N 25°27′E
- Country: Romania
- County: Harghita

Government
  - Mayor (2024–2028): Laczkó-Albert Elemér (UDMR)
- Area: 106 km^{2} (41 sq mi)
- Population (2021-12-01): 5,953
  - Density: 56.2/km^{2} (145/sq mi)
- Time zone: UTC+02:00 (EET)
  - Summer (DST): UTC+03:00 (EEST)
- Postal code: 537250
- Area code: +40 266
- Vehicle reg.: HR
- Website: www.gyergyoremete.eu

Remetea (Hungarian: Gyergyóremete, or colloquially Remete; Hungarian pronunciation: [ˈɟɛrɟoːrɛmɛtɛ], meaning "Hermit of Gyergyó") is a commune in Harghita County, Romania. It lies in the Székely Land, an ethno-cultural region in eastern Transylvania.

== Component villages ==
The commune is composed of four villages:

In Romanian	In Hungarian
Făgețel	Kisbükk
Martonca	Martonka
Remetea	Remete
Sineu	Eszenyő

== History ==
The villages were part of the Székely Land region of the historical Transylvania province. They belonged to Gyergyószék district until the administrative reform of Transylvania in 1876, when they fell within the Csík County in the Kingdom of Hungary. After the Treaty of Trianon of 1920, they became part of Romania and fell within Ciuc County during the interwar period. In 1940, the second Vienna Award granted the Northern Transylvania to Hungary and the villages were held by Hungary until 1944. After Soviet occupation, the Romanian administration returned and the commune became officially part of Romania in 1947. Between 1952 and 1960, the commune fell within the Magyar Autonomous Region, between 1960 and 1968 the Mureș-Magyar Autonomous Region. In 1968, the province was abolished, and since then, the commune has been part of Harghita County.

== Demographics ==
The commune has an absolute Hungarian (Székely) majority. According to the 2002 census it has a population of 6,316 of which 99.27% or 6,270 are Hungarian.

== Natives ==
- Balás Jenő - mining engineer, founder of the Hungarian aluminium industry
- Cseres Tibor - writer
- Győrffy Antal - actor, theatre director
- Molnár Levente - opera singer
- Paál Elek- writer, publisher
- Puskás Ferenc, P. Hugolin OFM - Franciscan friar, journalist/columnist
- Máté Simon (born 2006), professional footballer
