= Pauls Svars =

Latvian ice hockey player (born 1998)

- Born: 11 March 1998 (age 28) Liepāja, Latvia
- Height: 5 ft 11 in (180 cm)
- Weight: 183 lb (83 kg; 13 st 1 lb)
- Position: Defenceman
- Shoots: Left
- LHHL team Former teams: Liepājas HK; Dinamo Riga
- National team: Latvia
- Playing career: 2017–present

Pauls Svars (born 11 March 1998) is a Latvian ice hockey defenceman playing for Liepājas HK of the Latvian Hockey Higher League.

== Career statistics ==
=== Regular season and playoffs ===
			Regular season					Playoffs
Season	Team	League	GP	G	A	Pts	PIM	GP	G	A	Pts	PIM
2013–14	SK Riga 17	Latvia U18	22	6	11	17	14	—	—	—	—	—
2014–15	SK Riga 17	Latvia2	29	8	21	29	18	—	—	—	—	—
2015–16	HK Riga	MHL	42	2	10	12	16	—	—	—	—	—
2016–17	HK Riga	MHL	56	4	11	15	40	—	—	—	—	—
2016–17	HS Rīga	Latvia	—	—	—	—	—	5	0	1	1	2
2017–18	Dinamo Riga	KHL	6	0	0	0	0	—	—	—	—	—
2017–18	HK Riga	MHL	30	3	12	15	20	—	—	—	—	—
2018–19	HK Riga	MHL	60	4	12	16	12	—	—	—	—	—
2019–20	Olimp Riga	Latvia	23	1	3	4	6	—	—	—	—	—
2020–21	Olimp Riga	Latvia	9	0	1	1	2	9	0	1	1	0
2021–22	Olimp Riga	Latvia	36	2	18	20	14	10	1	3	4	2
2022–23	Dunaújvárosi Acélbikák	Erste Liga	29	1	12	13	9	8	0	0	0	—
2023–24	Dunaújvárosi Acélbikák	Erste Liga	34	4	13	17	2	—	—	—	—	—
2023–24	KH Toruń	PHL	6	0	1	1	2	6	1	3	4	4
2024–25	KH Toruń	PHL	34	1	13	14	10	6	0	2	2	4
2025–26	Liepājas HK	Latvia	39	10	31	41	10	9	2	2	4	6
Latvia totals			107	13	53	66	32	33	3	7	10	10
KHL totals			6	0	0	0	0	0	0	0	0	0

=== International ===
Year	Team	Event	GP	G	A	Pts	PIM
2016	Latvia U18	WJC-18	7	0	6	6	0
2018	Latvia U20	WJC-20 (D1)	5	0	5	5	0
Junior totals			12	0	11	11	0
