= Aleksejs Auziņš =

Latvian footballer, manager, and ice hockey player

Personal information
- Full name: Aleksejs Karlis Auziņš
- Nationality: Latvian
- Born: 7 August 1910; Jelgava, Russian Empire
- Died: 25 April 1997 (aged 86); Riga, Latvia

Sport
- Sport: Association football; Ice hockey
- Updated on 27 September 2012

Aleksejs Karlis Auziņš (7 August 1910 in Jelgava, Russian Empire – 25 April 1997 in Riga, Latvia) was a Latvian football midfielder, manager and also an ice hockey player.

== Football playing career ==
Auziņš was born in the provincial city of Jelgava, but he made his first serious steps in football in Riga where he joined the Latvia Higher League side Amatieris in 1927. He played with Amatieris until 1930, but in 1931 he joined Riga Vanderers, a much stronger club than Amatieris whose days of glory were already in the past. In the early 1930s Auziņš became a candidate for Latvia national football team, but he did not play for it until 1935. He played with Vanderers until 1939 and the biggest achievements were two second-place finishes in the Latvian league – in 1932 and 1934. In 1936 Auziņš was a member of the Vanderers squad that won the Latvian Cup (in the first year when its name had been changed from Riga Football Cup) and another time in 1938. With the Latvia national team Auziņš played seven matches in 1935.

Auziņš played with Riga Vanderers until 1939, then retired from active football only to return to it during World War II. In 1941 during the German occupation of Latvia he played with the Students football club, and from 1942 to 1944 – with US Riga.

== Ice hockey playing career ==
In ice hockey Auziņš played all of his career with the hockey team of US Riga winning three Latvian league titles – in 1937, 1940 and 1942. He played with Latvia national ice hockey team at the 1936 Winter Olympics.

== Coaching career ==
Auziņš was the director of the Lokomotīve football stadium in Riga for more than three decades – from 1947 to 1980 but in addition to it he also worked as a football and ice hockey coach. In football, he worked with the senior squad of Lokomotive Riga (from 1956 to 1959) and with its youth squad. The most notable footballers whom he coached include Vilnis Straume and Leonards Andžāns.
