= Kaspars Saulietis =

Latvian ice hockey player (born 1987)

- Born: 12 June 1987 (age 38) Riga, Latvian SSR, Soviet Union
- Height: 6 ft 1 in (185 cm)
- Weight: 194 lb (88 kg; 13 st 12 lb)
- Position: Right wing
- Shoots: Right
- KHL team Former teams: Dinamo Riga; HPK; HK Riga 2000; Kelowna Rockets; Regina Pats; Metallurg Zhlobin; Dynamo Minsk; HC Litvínov; HK Neman Grodno
- National team: Latvia
- Playing career: 2004–present

Kaspars Saulietis (born 12 June 1987) is a Latvian ice hockey right winger, currently playing for Dinamo Riga of the Kontinental Hockey League.
