= Mārtiņš Porejs =

Latvian ice hockey player

- Born: July 6, 1991 (age 35) Riga, Latvia
- Height: 5 ft 10 in (178 cm)
- Weight: 178 lb (81 kg; 12 st 10 lb)
- Position: Defence
- Shoots: L
- KHL team Former teams: Dinamo Riga; SK Riga 91; SK LSPA/Riga
- National team: Latvia
- Playing career: 2007–present

Mārtiņš Porejs (born July 6, 1991 in Riga) is a Latvian ice hockey player, currently playing for Dinamo Riga of Kontinental Hockey League. He played for SK Riga 18 and SK LSPA/Riga teams before joining HK Riga.

On November 23, 2012, he made his debut in KHL playing for Dinamo Riga on 1–0 win against Neftekhimik.
