= Utenos pramogų arena =

Indoor arena in Vilnius, Lithuania

Pramogų Arena
- Pramogų Arena
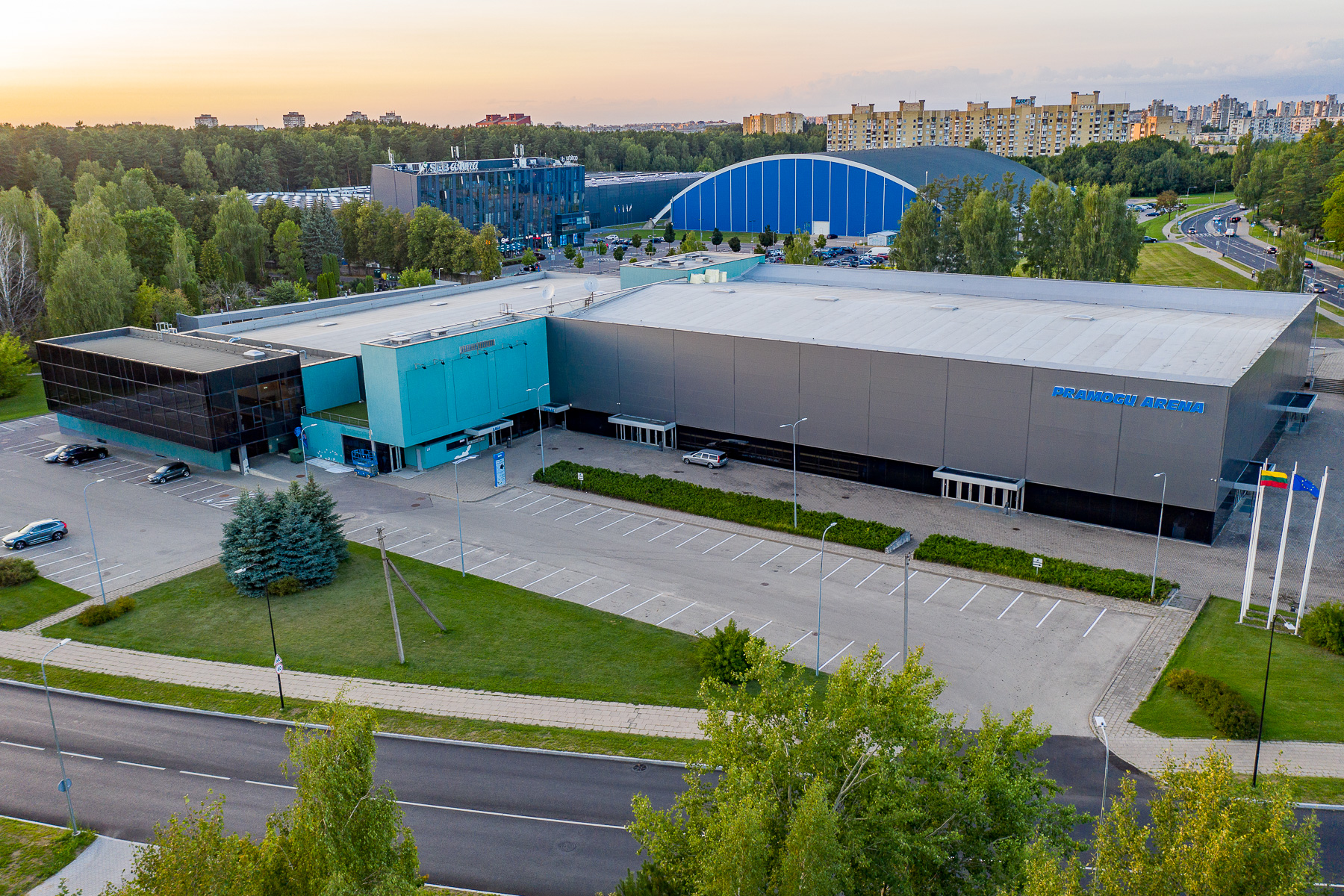
- Interactive map of Pramogų Arena
- Address: Ąžuolyno g. 9
- Location: Vilnius, Lithuania
- Coordinates: 54°42′20″N 25°14′11″E
- Owner: Pramogų Arena
- Capacity: Concerts: 4,000; Ice hockey: 2,500

Construction
- Opened: 2002

Pramogų arena formerly known as Vilnius Ice Palace is an arena in Vilnius, Lithuania.

The Arena was built in 2002. There is a skating rink (sports, fine, speed, individual and mass skating possible), a cafe with 2 halls (50 seats in the first floor, 150 seats in the second floor; up to 200 guests during the buffet). Hockey or curling can be played in the arena. The arena holds about 2.5 thousand spectators during hockey competitions, concerts, or, if the stage is set at the end of the arena, 4 thousand spectators. World-class star concerts take place in this arena.

Preceded by Tampere Exhibition and Sports Centre; Tampere	European Wrestling Championships; Venue; 2009	Succeeded by Heydar Aliyev Sports and Exhibition Complex; Baku
