= Deivids Sarkanis =

Latvian ice hockey player

- Born: November 17, 1994 (age 31) Riga, Latvia
- Height: 5 ft 9 in (175 cm)
- Weight: 154 lb (70 kg; 11 st 0 lb)
- Position: Left wing
- Shoots: Left
- NIHL team Former teams: Milton Keynes Lightning; Pingouins de Morzine-Avoriaz; Nottingham Panthers; HK Kurbads; HK Mogo; Dinamo Rīga; Kalix HC
- National team: Latvia
- Playing career: 2013–present

Deivids Sarkanis (born November 17, 1994) is a Latvian professional ice hockey player currently playing for English NIHL side Milton Keynes Lightning. Sarkanis previously played for Dinamo Riga in the Kontinental Hockey League (KHL).

== Playing career ==
Sarkanis began his hockey career playing in minor and junior Latvian hockey leagues. In 2011/2012 season he joined HK Rīga Dinamo Rīga minor league affiliate. In 2013/13 season Sarkanis spent several matches as a healthy stretch for Dinamo Rīga, before he made his KHL debut on October 30 on 2:1 win against Lokomotiv Yaroslavl.

In February 2017, Sarkanis moved to the UK to sign for the Nottingham Panthers until the end of the season.

He has since had spells back in Latvia with HK Kurbads, HK Mogo and Dinamo Riga. For the 2020-21 season, Sarkanis moved to Sweden to sign for Kalix HC.

== International play ==
Sarkanis participated at the 2012 World Junior Ice Hockey Championships as a member of the Latvia men's national junior ice hockey team.
