= Baltic Cup (ice hockey) =

Ice hockey competition among the national teams from Baltic countries

The Baltic Cup was an ice hockey tournament held during 2004–05 season. The three Baltic nations, Estonia, Latvia, and Lithuania, participated, and Poland also sent a team. There were four rounds of the tournament, one in each country.

== 2004–05 season ==
Four three-day tournaments were staged between August 27, 2004, and February 7, 2005, so that each of the four participants were able to host a tournament.

The tournaments were held in the Estonian capital of Tallinn from August 27–29, 2004, the Lithuanian city of Elektrenai from November 5–7, 2004, the Polish city of Gdańsk from December 17–19, 2004, and the Latvian city of Ogre from February 5–7, 2005.

Stoczniowiec Gdańsk won the first three tournaments and had already wrapped up the competition heading into the fourth tournament. ASK/Ogre won the final tournament.

	Club	GP	W	OTW	T	OTL	L	Goals	Pts
1.	(Poland) Stoczniowiec Gdańsk	12	9	1	1	1	0	63:27	31
2.	(Latvia) ASK/Ogre	12	4	2	1	0	5	44:38	18
3.	(Lithuania) SC Energija	12	5	0	1	1	5	48:58	18
4.	Estonia	12	1	0	1	1	9	25:57	4
