= HK Mogo =

Ice hockey team in Riga, Latvia

HK Mogo/RSU
- City: Riga, Latvia
- League: OHL
- Founded: 2014
- Home arena: Mogo ice hall (capacity: 600)
- Colours: Dark blue, lime green, white
- General manager: Elvis Želubovskis
- Head coach: Ģirts Ankipāns
- Captain: Renārs Demiters
- Website: www.mogohalle.lv/hokeja-klubs-mogo

Franchise history
- 2014–2020: HK Mogo
- 2020–2024: HK Mogo/LSPA
- 2024–present: HK Mogo/RSU

Championships
- Playoff championships: 5 (2015, 2019, 2024, 2025, 2026)

HK Mogo/RSU is a professional ice hockey team based in Riga, Latvia. The team competes in the Latvian Hockey Higher League, the top tier of ice hockey in Latvia. The team plays its home games at the Mogo ice hall.

== History ==
HK Mogo was founded in 2014 by the Latvian company Mogo Finance and joined the Latvian Hockey Higher League for the start of the 2014–15 season. Mogo's debut season was a strong one, finishing in first place with 73 points, seven points ahead of the second placed HK Liepāja. As a result of their first-place finish in the regular season Mogo advanced straight to the playoff semifinals, bypassing the first round. They made it to the final, after beating HK Zemgale/JLSS in the semi's, where they faced-off against HK Kurbads in a best of seven series, in which Mogo were triumphant, winning the championship in their debut season. The following season saw Mogo finish in 2nd place in the regular season as they looked to defend their championship; they made it to the play-off semi finals before losing to cross-town rivals HK Kurbads. Mogo would however win the bronze medal game against HK Prizma, allowing them to collect their second medal in as many years. The 2016–17 season saw Mogo finish top of the table in the regular season, ahead of second place team HK Kurbads by 6 points. Kurbads would have a measure of revenge however, as they beat Mogo in the play-off final, with Mogo having to settle for the silver medal. Mogo would again finish the season in 1st place during the 2017–18 season of the newly renamed Optibet Hockey League, which saw them lead 2nd place team HK Liepāja by 12 points, however, they lost in the play-off semi-final to HK Zemgale/JLSS who would subsequently lose in the final to HK Kurbads. The following season Mogo, who strengthened their side by signing former KHL player Kaspars Saulietis in the off-season, finished in 1st place for the third year running, after securing a comfortable lead at the top of the table - 18 points clear of the second place Zemgale. They would see further success in the play-offs, beating rivals Kurbads in overtime during Game 6 of the finals to claim their 2nd Latvian championship. In the off-season Mogo further strengthened their team by signing 3-time Olympian and KHL veteran Krišjānis Rēdlihs, who helped the team to a third place finish in the regular season, before the play-offs were cancelled due to COVID-19 pandemic.

In 2020 Mogo formed a partnership with the Latvian Academy of Sport Education and a result the team changed their name to HK Mogo/LSPA

In 2015 the Latvian Ice Hockey Federation announced the re-launch of the Latvian Cup which had been dormant since 2008, and that it would be open to all Latvian Hockey Higher League and 1.Līga clubs. Mogo, along with HK Kurbads, advanced straight to the second round of the 2015–16 competition as a result of being the finalists in the 2014–15 Latvian Hockey Higher League playoffs. Mogo made it to final, having beaten both Daugavpils/LDZ Cargo of the 1.Līga and HK Zemgale/JLSS in the previous rounds, where they faced HK Kurbads. Mogo would beat Kurbads 4–3 at Arena Riga, having been trailing the game until midway through the third period. The 2016/17 Cup again saw Kurbads vs Mogo in the final, with Mogo again being victorious, beating Kurbads in overtime 3-2. In the 2017/18 edition of the tournament, the two rivals would meet in the finals for the third year in a row, with Mogo once again being triumphant, with the game finishing the same way it did the year previously; with a 3-2 overtime victory. Following this edition of the Cup, the competition was once again discontinued.

As a result of winning the Latvian Hockey Higher League play-offs in 2015, Mogo qualified for the 2015–16 IIHF Continental Cup where they entered in the second round. Mogo was drawn in Group B with CH Jaca of Spain, Slovenian side HDD Jesenice and Hungarian's Miskolci Jegesmedve. Mogo finished the round-robin Group B tournament in first place after winning all three of their games, and advanced to the third round where they were drawn in Group D against Italian outfit HC Asiago, Danish champions Herning Blue Fox and Yertis Pavlodar from Kazakhstan. Mogo failed to win any of their three games in the third round, finishing in last place and failing to qualify for the final round. HK Mogo would return to continental competition for the 2019–20 Continental Cup as a result of winning their second Latvian championship. They were placed in Group C alongside Ukrainian team HC Donbass, Corona Brașov of Romania and Serbian outfit Crvena Zvezda Belgrade. Mogo beat both Corona Brașov and Crvena Zvezda, however, ultimately lost in a shoot-out to Donbass, resulting in Mogo finishing in 2nd place and not progressing in the competition.

In 2020 HK Mogo took place in the inaugural Baltic Hockey League, a competition made up of two teams from each of Estonia, Latvia and Lithuania. They finished second in their group after beating Kaunas Hockey, however, their final game against Tartu Välk 494 was cancelled after 4 of the Välk 494 squad tested positive for COVID-19. Despite this, both Välk 494 and HK Mogo qualified for the final round, as both teams had already beaten the Lithuanian team. The finals of the tournament were scheduled to take place in February 2021, having been postponed from December 2020 to several HK Mogo players contracting the virus. In early February the final round was again postponed due to the pandemic, with the date to be announced when the Covid situation improves.

=== Rivalry with HK Kurbads ===
Due to both teams being based in Riga, and the two sides often facing each other in the play-off and Latvian cup finals, a rivalry between the two developed, with even the regular season meetings carrying some increased significance.

== Roster ==
Updated February 17, 2021.

Goaltenders
Number		Player	Catches	Acquired	Place of Birth
33	(Latvia)	Henrijs Ančs	L	2014	-
27	(Latvia)	Renārs Kazanovs	L	2014	Riga, Latvia
30	(Latvia)	Artūrs Šilovs	L	2020	Riga, Latvia

Defencemen
Number		Player	Shoots	Acquired	Place of Birth
26	(Latvia)	Bruno Bakanovs	L	2018	Dreiliņi, Latvia
36	(Latvia)	Kristaps Bazevičs	L	2020	Riga, Latvia
23	(Latvia)	Jānis Bulītis	L	2016	Riga, Latvia
15	(Latvia)	Kārlis Čukste	L	2020	Riga, Latvia
72	(Latvia)	Renārs Demiters (C)	L	2018	Riga, Latvia
29	(Latvia)	Aleksandrs Frīdenbergs	L	2019	-
5	(Latvia)	Andrejs Lavrenovs (A)	L	2014	Ogre, Latvia
55	(Latvia)	Krišs Lipsbergs (A)	L	2016	Riga, Latvia
91	(Latvia)	Dāvis Orniņš	R	2020	-
46	(Latvia)	Krišjānis Rēdlihs	L	2020	Riga, Latvia
13	(Latvia)	Edgars Ozoliņš	L	2020	Riga, Latvia
87	(Latvia)	Tomass Zeile	L	2020	Riga, Latvia

Forwards
Number		Player	Shoots	Position	Acquired	Place of Birth
9	(Latvia)	Gatis Gricinskis	L	C/RW	2018	Talsi, Latvia
88	(Latvia)	Jānis Grigaļūns	L	F	-	-
25	(Latvia)	Ričards Grīnbergs	L	W	2020	Valmiera, Latvia
88	(Latvia)	Renārs Krastenbergs	L	C/LW	2020	Jelgava, Latvia
4	(Latvia)	Edgars Kurmis	L	RW	2014	Riga, Latvia
11	(Latvia)	Miks Lipsbergs	L	RW	2019	Riga, Latvia
26	(Latvia)	Dans Ločmelis	L	F	2020	Jelgava, Latvia
28	(Latvia)	Vladimirs Mamonovs	R	LW	2015	Riga, Latvia
74	(Latvia)	Daniels Mūrnieks	R	C	2020	Riga, Latvia
16	(Latvia)	Toms Opelts	L	F	2018	-
18	(Latvia)	Jānis Ozoliņš	L	F	2015	Riga, Latvia
47	(Latvia)	Lauris Rancevs	L	W	2020	Riga, Latvia
61	(Latvia)	Kaspars Saulietis	L	RW/LW	2018	Riga, Latvia
44	(United States)	Robert Schremp	L	C	2020	Fulton, United States
22	(Latvia)	Andris Siksnis	L	LW	2015	Riga, Latvia
7	(Latvia)	Jānis Straupe	R	C/W	2020	Riga, Latvia
21	(Latvia)	Patriks Trasūns	L	RW	2020	Bauska, Latvia
17	(Latvia)	Elviss Želubovskis	R	RW/C	2014	Riga, Latvia
12	(Latvia)	Juris Ziemiņš	L	LW	2016	Riga, Latvia

== Season-by-season record ==
Note: GP = Games played, W = Wins, L = Losses, T = Ties, OTL = Overtime losses, Pts = Points, GF = Goals for, GA = Goals against, PIM = Penalties in minutes

Season	League	GP	W	L	T	OTW	OTL	Pts	GF	GA	Finish	Playoffs
2015–16	Latvian Hockey Higher League	30	19	5	—	4	2	67	169	83	2nd	Bronze medal
2016–17	Latvian Hockey Higher League	30	21	5	—	3	1	70	196	94	1st	Final loss
2017–18	Optibet Hockey League	30	21	4	—	4	1	72	147	72	1st	Semi-final loss
2018–19	Optibet Hockey League	36	25	5	—	3	3	84	165	79	1st	Champions
2019–20	Optibet Hockey League	35	22	9	—	2	2	50	150	101	3rd	Playoffs cancelled

== Honours ==
Latvian Championships:

- 2015, 2019, 2024, 2025

Latvian Cup

- 2016, 2017, 2018.

== Team records ==
=== Career ===
These are the top five scorers in HK Mogo history.

Note: Pos = Position; GP = Games played; G = Goals; A = Assists; Pts = Points

Player	Pos	GP	G	A	Pts
Elvis Želubovskis	F	212	119	124	243
Vladimirs Mamonovs	F	176	71	85	156
Andris Siksnis	F	176	69	77	146
Juris Ziemiņš	F	155	62	65	127
Miks Lipsbergs	F	109	57	69	126

Penalty minutes: Elvis Želubovskis, 411

=== Season ===
==== Regular season ====
- Most goals in a season: Elvis Želubovskis, 26 (2016–17)
- Most assists in a season: Krišs Lipsbergs, 30 (2016–17)
- Most points in a season: Elvis Želubovskis, 54 (2016–17)
- Most penalty minutes in a season: Elvis Želubovskis, 93 (2019–20)

==== Playoffs ====
- Most goals in a playoff season: Miks Lipsbergs, 8 (2014–15)
- Most assists in a playoff season: Oļegs Sorokins, 9 (2014–15)
- Most points in a playoff season: Miks Lipsbergs, 14 (2014–15)
- Most penalty minutes in a playoff season: Elvis Želubovskis, 33 (2017–18)

== Notable players ==
- Krišjānis Rēdlihs
- Kaspars Saulietis

== Notable coaches ==
- Ģirts Ankipāns
