= Hockey Punks Vilnius =

Ice hockey team in Vilnius, Lithuania

- City: Vilnius, Lithuania
- League: OHL
- Founded: 2007
- Home arena: Pramogų Arena (capacity: 2,500)
- Colours: Black, red, white
- Head coach: Juraj Boldiš
- Website: www.hockeypunks.lt

Hockey Punks Vilnius is a professional ice hockey team located in Vilnius, Lithuania. The team competes in the Latvian Hockey Higher League, the top tier of ice hockey in Latvia. The team plays its home games at Pramogų arena.

== History ==
Hockey Punks Vilnius were founded in 2007 when Lithuanian national team players Šarūnas Kuliešius and Martynas Šlikas started popularising the sport in the capital. Interest in the sport further increased following the launch of 'Heat on Ice' on Tango TV. Heat on Ice was a weekly show covering the latest hockey news and highlights from around the world, with celebrity guests. One of these guests was G&G Sindikatas rapper Gabrielius 'Svaras' Liaudanskas who would go on to be a prominent supporter of the team, often promoting Hockey Punks in interviews. Svaras would subsequently play for the team for 6 years, as did his bandmate Andrius 'Pushaz' Glušakovas.

Initially, Hockey Punks focused solely on training, before ultimately joining the Lithuanian second tier in 2010. Their first season was a tough one, only winning one game whilst suffering a goal difference of -41. Three seasons later, Hockey Punks were admitted to the Lithuania Hockey League, where they have played since. During their time in the NLRL, Hockey Punks have not won the league, however, they have lost in the playoff finals on two occasions; in 2016 and 2019.

Between 2013 and 2017 former NHL star and Olympic gold medalist Darius Kasparaitis played sporadically for the Hockey Punks in order to qualify for the Lithuanian national team, having previously represented Russia. During this time with the team Kasparaitis played 7 games for the Hockey Punks, registering 22 points.

In 2020, Hockey Punks took part in the inaugural Baltic Hockey League, a competition made up of two teams from each of Estonia, Latvia and Lithuania. The team finished second in their group after beating Estonian side HC Everest, but losing to Latvia's HK Liepāja, and therefore qualified for the final round, scheduled for February 2021.

== Season-by-season record ==
Note: GP = Games played, W = Wins, L = Losses, T = Ties, OTL = Overtime losses, Pts = Points, GF = Goals for, GA = Goals against, PIM = Penalties in minutes

Season	GP	W	L	T	OTW	OTL	Pts	GF	GA	Finish	Playoffs
2015–16	24	16	6	—	0	2	50	130	89	2nd	Lost in final
2016–17	20	10	9	—	1	0	32	87	32	3rd	Lost in semifinal
201718	20	10	8	—	0	2	32	91	32	3rd	Lost in semifinal
2018–19	18	5	11	—	2	0	19	51	78	3rd	Lost in final
2019–20	18	12	4	—	1	1	39	120	64	2	Playoffs cancelled

== Team records ==
=== Career ===
These are the top five scorers in Hockey Punks history.

Note: Pos = Position; GP = Games played; G = Goals; A = Assists; Pts = Points

Player	Pos	GP	G	A	Pts
Šarūnas Kuliešius	F	104	44	88	132
Edgar Rybakov	F	63	51	76	127
Karolis Šlikas	F	94	53	68	121
Algimantas Visockas	F	98	47	45	92
Mindaugas Kieras	D	46	25	41	66

Penalty minutes: Modestas Kartenis, 188

=== Season ===
==== Regular season ====
- Most goals in a season: Edgar Rybakov, 21(2017–18)
- Most assists in a season: Edgar Rybakov, 29 (2017–18)
- Most points in a season: Edgar Rybakov, 50 (2017–18)
- Most penalty minutes in a season: Lukas Jonuska, 90 (2019–20)

==== Playoffs ====
- Most goals in a playoff season: Mindaugas Kieras, 6 (2017–18)
- Most assists in a playoff season: Sarunas Suchomlinas, 10 (2017–18)
- Most points in a playoff season: Mindaugas Kieras, 11 (2017–18)
- Most penalty minutes in a playoff season: Sergei Markovsky, 31 (2018–19)

== Notable players ==
- Darius Kasparaitis
