= Sport1 (Lithuanian TV channel) =

Lithuanian sports channel

- Broadcast area: Lithuania
- Headquarters: Vilnius, Lithuania

History
- Launched: 16 August 2008; 16 years ago

Links
- Website: www.sport1.lt

Sport1 is a Lithuanian sport channel founded on 16 August 2008. It became the first sport channel in Lithuania founded by the Lithuanian television network and broadcasts all programs only in Lithuanian language.

== See also ==
- Television in Lithuania
