= Lithuanian Ice Hockey Federation =

National sports organisation

Lithuania
- Association name: Lithuanian Ice Hockey Federation
- IIHF Code: LTU
- IIHF membership: February 19, 1938
- President: Dainius Zubrus
- IIHF men's ranking: 24th
- IIHF women's ranking: 33rd

The Lithuanian Ice Hockey Federation (Lithuanian: Lietuvos ledo ritulio federacija, LLRF), also known as Hockey Lietuva, is the governing body that oversees ice hockey in Lithuania. Lithuania had first joined the International Ice Hockey Federation (IIHF) on February 19, 1938, but was annexed by the Soviet Union in 1940. The nation re-joined the IIHF on May 6, 1992, along with Estonia and Latvia.

== See also ==
- Lithuania men's national ice hockey team
- Lithuania women's national ice hockey team
