= Sergejs Seņins =

Latvian ice hockey player

- Born: April 16, 1972 (age 54) Soviet Union
- Height: 5 ft 11 in (180 cm)
- Weight: 187 lb (85 kg; 13 st 5 lb)
- Position: Right wing
- Shot: Left
- Played for: Dinamo Riga; Pārdaugava Rīga; EC Peiting; Severstal Cherepovets; Frederikshavn; Esbjerg; Herning; Halmstad Hammers; Metalurgs Liepaja; Trondheim
- National team: Latvia
- Playing career: 1991–2012

Sergejs Seņins (born April 16, 1972) is a retired Latvian professional ice hockey player.

== Playing career ==
Seņins began his professional career in Dinamo Riga, however he played most of his games for Dinamo successor Pārdaugava Rīga. Where he played for tree seasons through 1992-93 to 1994-95. For most of his career he played outside Latvia, mostly in Denmark.

=== International ===
Seņins made national team roster for World Championships on two occasions in 1997 and 2000 and in 2002 Winter Olympics.

== Career statistics ==
=== Regular season and playoffs ===
| | | | Regular season | | | | | Playoffs |
| Season | Team | League | GP | G | A | Pts | PIM | GP | G | A | Pts | PIM |
|---|---|---|---|---|---|---|---|---|---|---|---|---|
| 1988–89 | RASMS-Energo Rīga | URS.3 | 10 | 2 | 1 | 3 | 4 | — | — | — | — | — |
| 1989–90 | RASMS-Energo Rīga | URS.3 | 63 | 16 | 19 | 35 | 24 | — | — | — | — | — |
| 1990–91 | Dinamo Rīga | URS | 2 | 0 | 0 | 0 | 0 | — | — | — | — | — |
| 1990–91 | RASMS Rīga | URS.3 | 56 | 16 | 12 | 28 | 46 | — | — | — | — | — |
| 1991–92 | Stars Rīga | CIS | 22 | 4 | 1 | 5 | 10 | — | — | — | — | — |
| 1991–92 | RASMS Rīga | CIS.3 | 4 | 2 | 1 | 3 | 0 | — | — | — | — | — |
| 1992–93 | Pārdaugava Rīga | LAT | 5 | 3 | 2 | 5 | 0 | — | — | — | — | — |
| 1992–93 | Pārdaugava Rīga | IHL | 41 | 10 | 13 | 23 | 22 | 2 | 2 | 0 | 2 | 2 |
| 1993–94 | Pārdaugava Rīga | IHL | 29 | 4 | 4 | 8 | 22 | — | — | — | — | — |
| 1994–95 | Pārdaugava Rīga | IHL | 41 | 5 | 7 | 12 | 30 | — | — | — | — | — |
| 1994–95 | EC Peiting | DEU.2 | 12 | 13 | 8 | 21 | | — | — | — | — | — |
| 1995–96 | EC Peiting | DEU.2 | 28 | 24 | 28 | 52 | | — | — | — | — | — |
| 1996–97 | Severstal Cherepovets | RSL | 5 | 0 | 1 | 1 | 4 | — | — | — | — | — |
| 1996–97 | Severstal–2 Cherepovets | RUS.3 | 5 | 3 | 1 | 4 | 6 | — | — | — | — | — |
| 1997–98 | Frederikshavn White Hawks | DEN | 47 | 38 | 24 | 62 | 40 | — | — | — | — | — |
| 1998–99 | Frederikshavn White Hawks | DEN | 36 | 37 | 47 | 84 | 40 | — | — | — | — | — |
| 1999–2000 | Frederikshavn White Hawks | DEN | 52 | 23 | 50 | 73 | 52 | — | — | — | — | — |
| 2000–01 | Esbjerg IK | DEN | 44 | 21 | 35 | 56 | 57 | — | — | — | — | — |
| 2001–02 | Herning Blue Fox | DEN | 45 | 14 | 18 | 32 | 36 | 3 | 2 | 1 | 3 |
| 2002–03 | Halmstad Hammers HC | Allsv | 11 | 1 | 5 | 6 | 4 | — | — | — | — | — |
| 2002–03 | HK Liepājas Metalurgs | EEHL | 19 | 4 | 5 | 9 | 12 | — | — | — | — | — |
| 2003–04 | Trondheim Black Panthers | NOR | 13 | 3 | 2 | 5 | 4 | — | — | — | — | — |
| 2003–04 | Vilki OP | LAT | 2 | 6 | 3 | 9 | 0 | — | — | — | — | — |
| 2003–04 | HK Rīga 2000 | EEHL | 10 | 2 | 4 | 6 | 4 | — | — | — | — | — |
| 2004–05 | HK Rīga 2000 | LAT | 40 | 9 | 9 | 18 | 6 | — | — | — | — | — |
| 2004–05 | HK Rīga 2000 | BLR | 30 | 6 | 7 | 13 | 4 | — | — | — | — | — |
| 2005–06 | Tyringe SoSS | SWE.3 | 16 | 1 | 4 | 5 | 14 | — | — | — | — | — |
| 2005–06 | Osby IK | SWE.3 | 17 | 1 | 6 | 7 | 10 | — | — | — | — | — |
| 2006–07 | ASK/Ogre | LAT | 5 | 2 | 1 | 3 | 6 | — | — | — | — | — |
| 2007–08 | Tartu Big Diamonds | LAT | 26 | 6 | 10 | 16 | 32 | — | — | — | — | — |
| 2008–09 | HK Ozolnieki/Monarhs | LAT | 25 | 8 | 20 | 28 | 14 | 2 | 0 | 0 | 0 | 0 |
| 2011–12 | HK Rīga/LSPA | LAT | 18 | 1 | 4 | 5 | 22 | — | — | — | — | — |
| 2013–14 | Haifa Hawks | ISR |
| LAT totals | | | 121 | 35 | 49 | 84 | 80 | 2 | 0 | 0 | 0 | 0 |
| IHL totals | | | 111 | 19 | 24 | 43 | 74 | 2 | 2 | 0 | 2 | 0 |
| DEN totals | | | 224 | 133 | 174 | 307 | 225 | 3 | 1 | 2 | 3 | — |

=== International ===
| Year | Team | Event | GP | G | A | Pts | PIM |
|---|---|---|---|---|---|---|---|
| 1993 | Latvia | WC C | 7 | 4 | 5 | 9 | 6 |
| 1994 | Latvia | WC B | 7 | 6 | 1 | 7 | 4 |
| 1995 | Latvia | WC B | 7 | 6 | 6 | 12 | 4 |
| 1997 | Latvia | WC | 8 | 0 | 2 | 2 | 4 |
| 1999 | Latvia | WC Q | 3 | 0 | 0 | 0 | 0 |
| 2000 | Latvia | WC | 7 | 0 | 0 | 0 | 0 |
| 2001 | Latvia | OGQ | 3 | 0 | 0 | 0 | 0 |
| 2002 | Latvia | OG | 4 | 0 | 1 | 1 | 4 |
| Senior totals | | | 46 | 16 | 15 | 31 | 22 |
