= Aleksandrs Kerčs =

Latvian ice hockey player

- Born: March 16, 1967 (age 59) Arkhangelsk, Russian SFSR, Soviet Union
- Height: 5 ft 10 in (178 cm)
- Weight: 190 lb (86 kg; 13 st 8 lb)
- Position: Left wing
- Shot: Right
- Played for: USSR; Dinamo Riga; NHL; Edmonton Oilers; Nationalliga A EHC Biel; SM-liiga; Tappara; DEL; Revierlöwen Oberhausen
- National team: Latvia
- NHL draft: 60th overall, 1993; Edmonton Oilers
- Playing career: 1984–2013

Aleksandrs Kerčs (sometimes anglicised as Alexander Kerch, Russian: Александр Ярославович Керч, Aleksandr Jaroslavovich Kerch; born March 16, 1967) is a retired Soviet and Latvian professional ice hockey left winger who played five games in the National Hockey League (NHL) for the Edmonton Oilers. He also appeared in several World Championships and the 2002 Winter Olympics for the Latvian national team. Previously, he represented the Soviet Union at the 1987 World Junior Ice Hockey Championships.

== Career ==
Kerčs enjoyed a lengthy career in European professional leagues, interrupted by a brief stint in North America for the 1993–94 season.

The Edmonton Oilers acquired the third-round draft pick of the New York Rangers (60th overall) along with Roman Oksiuta in a trade that saw Kevin Lowe join the Rangers. The Oilers used the pick on Kerčs, a 26-year-old of the Russian Elite League. Kerčs came to North America for the following season, where he spent the majority of the year with the Cape Breton Oilers of the AHL. He scored at a better-than-point-per-game clip in the minors and went pointless in five games with the Oilers. In the following year, Kerčs played one game with the Providence Bruins, before returning to Russia.

== International ==
Kerčs played internationally for Latvia between 1993-2005 and was part of the team that won the World Championships B-pool in 1996.

== Career statistics ==
=== Regular season and playoffs ===
			Regular season					Playoffs
Season	Team	League	GP	G	A	Pts	PIM	GP	G	A	Pts	PIM
1984–85	Dinamo Rīga	USSR	8	0	0	0	6	—	—	—	—	—
1984–85	Latvijas Berzs	USSR-3	—	18	—	—	—	—	—	—	—	—
1985–86	Dinamo Rīga	USSR	23	5	2	7	16	—	—	—	—	—
1986–87	Dinamo Rīga	USSR	26	5	4	9	10	—	—	—	—	—
1987–88	Dinamo Rīga	USSR	50	14	4	18	28	—	—	—	—	—
1988–89	Dinamo Rīga	USSR	39	6	7	13	41	—	—	—	—	—
1989–90	Dinamo Rīga	USSR	46	9	11	20	22	—	—	—	—	—
1990–91	Dinamo Rīga	USSR	46	16	17	33	46	—	—	—	—	—
1991–92	Stars Rīga	CIS	27	7	9	16	20	—	—	—	—	—
1992–93	Pārdaugava Rīga	IHL	42	23	14	37	28	2	1	2	3	2
1992–93	Pārdaugava–2 Rīga	LAT	7	4	5	9	6	—	—	—	—	—
1993–94	Edmonton Oilers	NHL	5	0	0	0	2	—	—	—	—	—
1993–94	Cape Breton Oilers	AHL	57	24	38	62	18	—	—	—	—	—
1994–95	Pārdaugava Rīga	IHL	11	4	0	4	4	—	—	—	—	—
1994–95	EHC Biel	NDA	2	0	1	1	4	—	—	—	—	—
1994–95	Providence Bruins	AHL	1	0	0	0	15	4	0	2	2	0
1995–96	Allianse Rīga	LAT	29	28	21	49	42	—	—	—	—	—
1996–97	EV Landsberg	GER-2	47	39	52	91	52	4	3	2	5	0
1997–98	Tappara	SM-l	46	14	17	31	57	4	1	0	1	2
1998–99	Revierlöwen Oberhausen	DEL	38	10	23	33	18	—	—	—	—	—
1999–2000	Revierlöwen Oberhausen	DEL	55	14	27	41	62	—	—	—	—	—
2000–01	Revierlöwen Oberhausen	DEL	57	10	16	26	48	3	0	3	3	0
2001–02	Berlin Capitals	DEL	56	15	19	34	52	7	3	1	4	4
2002–03	HK Rīga 2000	EEHL	8	3	4	7	8	—	—	—	—	—
2002–03	SKA Saint Petersburg	RSL	17	2	4	6	10	—	—	—	—	—
2003–04	HK Rīga 2000	EEHL	4	1	1	2	8	—	—	—	—	—
2003–04	Vilki OP	LAT	10	11	5	16	35	—	—	—	—	—
2003–04	Molot-Prikamye Perm	RUS-2	6	0	4	4	2	—	—	—	—	—
2003–04	Nyköpings Hockey	SWE-2	5	2	0	2	4	1	0	0	0	0
2004–05	HK Gomel	BEL	4	0	0	0	2	—	—	—	—	—
2004–05	Vilki OP	LAT	9	10	11	21	20	—	—	—	—	—
2004–05	Fischtown Pinguins	GER-2	12	1	5	6	22	1	0	0	0	0
2005–06	Khimik Voskresensk	RUS-2	14	2	4	6	10	—	—	—	—	—
2005–06	Vilki OP	LAT	—	10	7	17	44	—	—	—	—	—
2006–07	ASK/Ogre	LAT	40	23	34	57	64	10	11	7	18	18
2007–08	ASK/Ogre	LAT	41	26	47	73	68	6	1	7	8	10
2008–09	ASK/Ogre	BEL	38	10	32	42	36	—	—	—	—	—
2008–09	ASK/Ogre	LAT	—	—	—	—	—	9	4	10	14	10
2010–11	DHK Latgale	LAT	34	16	37	53	16	5	4	3	7	6
2011–12	HK SMScredit	LAT	14	5	12	17	6	6	3	2	5	10
2012–13	HK Ozolnieki/Monarhs	LAT	12	1	6	7	2	3	0	1	1	4
USSR/CIS totals			265	62	54	116	189	—	—	—	—	—
LAT totals			196	124	178	302	259	39	23	30	53	58
NHL totals			5	0	0	0	2	—	—	—	—	—

- LAT totals do not include stats from the 2005–06 season.

=== International ===
Year	Team	Event	Results	GP	G	A	Pts	PIM
1987	Soviet Union	WJC	DSQ	6	6	2	8	20
1993	Latvia	WC C	1st	7	8	13	21	4
1994	Latvia	OGQ	DNQ	4	7	2	9	2
1996	Latvia	WC B	1st	7	3	6	9	20
1996	Latvia	OGQ	DNQ	4	1	8	9
1997	Latvia	WC	7th	8	4	4	8	6
1998	Latvia	WC	9th	6	3	1	4	2
1999	Latvia	WC	11th	6	2	1	3	12
1999	Latvia	WC Q	Q	3	0	0	0	2
2000	Latvia	WC	8th	7	1	2	3	0
2001	Latvia	OGQ	Q	3	1	4	5	6
2001	Latvia	WC	13th	6	1	0	1	4
2002	Latvia	OG	9th	4	0	3	3	2
2002	Latvia	WC	11th	6	1	0	1	2
2003	Latvia	WC	9th	6	2	1	3	0
2004	Latvia	WC	7th	7	1	1	2	12
Junior totals				6	6	2	8	20
Senior totals				84	35	46	81	74
