= Gints Meija =

Latvian professional ice hockey winger (born 1987)

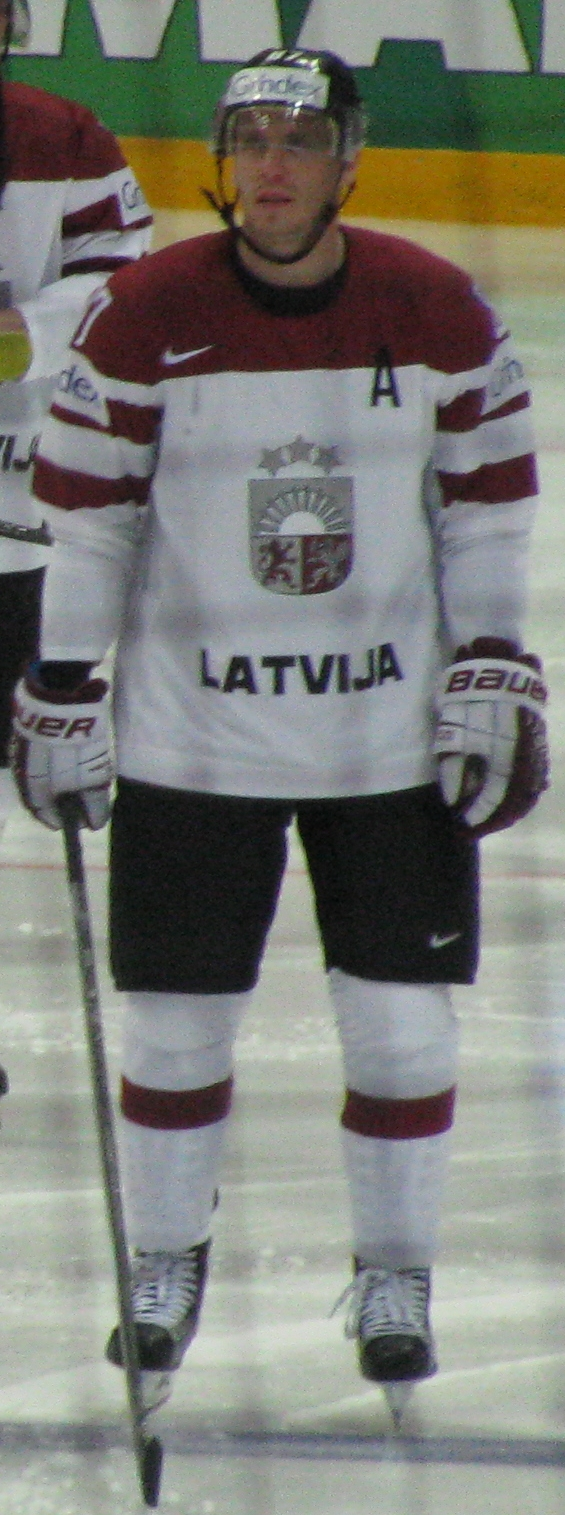
- Born: 4 September 1987 (age 38) Riga, Latvian SSR, Soviet Union
- Height: 6 ft 0 in (183 cm)
- Weight: 176 lb (80 kg; 12 st 8 lb)
- Position: Forward
- Shoots: Left
- LHHL team Former teams: HK Mogo; Dinamo Riga; Steinbach Black Wings 1992; Ducs d'Angers
- National team: Latvia
- NHL draft: Undrafted
- Playing career: 2004–present

Gints Meija (born September 4, 1987) is a Latvian professional ice hockey player who is a forward for HK Mogo of the Latvian Hockey Higher League. He previously played for Steinbach Black Wings 1992 of the ICE Hockey League (ICEHL).

== Career statistics ==
=== Regular season and playoffs ===
			Regular season					Playoffs
Season	Team	League	GP	G	A	Pts	PIM	GP	G	A	Pts	PIM
2004–05	SK Rīga 18	LAT	29	19	17	36	8	3	0	2	2	0
2005–06	SK Rīga 20	LAT		11	10	21	43	—	—	—	—	—
2006–07	SK Rīga 20	LAT	39	14	26	40	14	9	4	4	8	8
2007–08	HK Rīga 2000	LAT	39	17	24	41	26	7	0	6	6	0
2008–09	HK Rīga 2000	BLR	28	14	18	32	33	—	—	—	—	—
2008–09	Dinamo Rīga	KHL	18	0	0	0	0	—	—	—	—	—
2008–09	HK Rīga 2000	LAT	—	—	—	—	—	8	5	5	10	4
2009–10	Dinamo Rīga	KHL	26	1	2	3	8	9	1	1	2	0
2009–10	HK Dinamo/Juniors	BLR	12	5	12	17	2	—	—	—	—	—
2009–10	HK Dinamo/Juniors	LAT	—	—	—	—	—	5	1	5	6	2
2010–11	Dinamo Rīga	KHL	26	1	3	4	2	1	0	0	0	4
2010–11	HK Liepājas Metalurgs	BLR	12	4	9	13	26	—	—	—	—	—
2011–12	Dinamo Rīga	KHL	46	3	5	8	12	7	0	0	0	2
2012–13	Dinamo Rīga	KHL	50	4	9	13	24	—	—	—	—	—
2013–14	Dinamo Rīga	KHL	25	3	4	7	8	6	5	0	5	6
2014–15	Dinamo Rīga	KHL	59	9	6	15	16	—	—	—	—	—
2015–16	Dinamo Rīga	KHL	53	5	11	16	29	—	—	—	—	—
2016–17	Dinamo Rīga	KHL	60	7	6	13	22	—	—	—	—	—
2017–18	Dinamo Rīga	KHL	47	0	9	9	22	—	—	—	—	—
2018–19	Dinamo Rīga	KHL	51	5	5	10	32	—	—	—	—	—
2019–20	Dinamo Rīga	KHL	57	7	7	14	23	—	—	—	—	—
2020–21	Dinamo Rīga	KHL	11	0	1	1	4	—	—	—	—	—
2020–21	HK Olimp/Venta 2002	LAT	3	3	0	3	2	—	—	—	—	—
2020–21	Steinbach Black Wings 1992	ICEHL	11	3	1	4	11	—	—	—	—	—
2021–22	Dinamo Rīga	KHL	45	5	7	12	29	—	—	—	—	—
2021–22	HC Vita Hästen	Allsv	11	3	2	5	4	—	—	—	—	—
KHL totals			574	50	75	125	231	23	6	1	7	12

=== International ===
Year	Team	Event	Result	GP	G	A	Pts	PIM
2005	Latvia	WJC18 D1	15th	5	0	1	1	2
2006	Latvia	WJC	9th	6	2	0	2	4
2007	Latvia	WJC D1	13th	5	2	4	6	0
2010	Latvia	OG	12th	4	0	0	0	2
2010	Latvia	WC	11th	6	1	1	2	0
2011	Latvia	WC	13th	6	0	3	3	4
2012	Latvia	WC	10th	7	1	0	1	0
2013	Latvia	OGQ	Q	3	1	2	3	0
2013	Latvia	WC	11th	5	1	2	3	4
2014	Latvia	WC	11th	7	1	1	2	2
2016	Latvia	WC	13th	7	0	0	0	4
2016	Latvia	OGQ	DNQ	3	0	1	1	0
2017	Latvia	WC	10th	7	1	0	1	0
2018	Latvia	WC	8th	8	1	0	1	0
2019	Latvia	WC	10th	7	1	1	2	0
2021	Latvia	WC	11th	2	0	0	0	0
2022	Latvia	OG	11th	4	0	1	1	2
Junior totals				16	4	5	9	6
Senior totals				76	8	12	20	20
