= 2012 World Junior Ice Hockey Championships rosters =

== Group A ==
=== Latvia ===
- Head coach: (Latvia) Ēriks Miļuns

Pos.	No.	Player	Team	NHL Rights
GK	1	Rihards Cimermanis	(Latvia) HK Juniors Riga
GK	25	Kristers Gudļevskis	(Latvia) HK Riga
GK	30	Elvis Merzļikins	(Switzerland) HC Lugano (U20)
D	2	Kristaps Nīmanis	(Finland) Red Ducks Vaasa (Fin-3)
D	3	Ņikita Koļesņikovs	(Canada) Blainville-Boisbriand Armada
D	4	Edgars Siksna	(Latvia) HK Liepājas Metalurgs
D	6	Artūrs Salija	(Latvia) HK Riga
D	7	Pauls Zvirbulis	(Latvia) HK Riga
D	10	Kristers Freibergs	(Latvia) HK Riga
D	18	Krišs Lipsbergs	(Latvia) HK Riga
D	26	Krists Kalniņš	(Sweden) AIK Härnösand (Swe-3)
F	9	Kristiāns Pelšs	(Canada) Edmonton Oil Kings	Edmonton Oilers
F	11	Roberts Lipsbergs	(Latvia) HK Riga
F	12	Artūrs Kuzmenkovs	(Latvia) HK Riga
F	14	Vitālijs Hvorostiņins	(Finland) Sport
F	15	Juris Ziemiņš	(Latvia) HK Juniors Riga
F	16	Māris Diļevka	(Latvia) HK Liepājas Metalurgs
F	17	Dāvis Straupe	(Latvia) HK Riga
F	19	Edgars Kļaviņš	(Sweden) AIK (J20)
F	21	Teodors Bļugers	(United States) Shattuck-Saint Mary's
F	22	Zemgus Girgensons	(United States) Dubuque Fighting Saints
F	23	Toms Andersons	(Switzerland) SC Bern (U20)
F	31	Ņikita Jevpalovs	(Latvia) HK Riga

=== Russia ===
- Head coach: (Russia) Valeri Bragin

Pos.	No.	Player	Team	NHL Rights
GK	1	Sergei Kostenko	(Russia) Kuznetskie Medvedi
GK	20	Andrei Makarov	(Canada) Saskatoon Blades
GK	80	Andrei Vasilevski	(Russia) Tolpar Ufa
D	3	Artyom Sergeyev	(Canada) Val-d'Or Foreurs
D	4	Viktor Antipin	(Russia) Stalnye Lisy
D	6	Mikhail Naumenkov	(Russia) Krasnaya Armia
D	12	Grigory Zheldakov	(Russia) Spartak Moscow
D	24	Zakhar Arzamastsev	(Russia) Metallurg Novokuznetsk
D	26	Ildar Isangulov	(Russia) Tolpar Ufa
D	29	Nikita Nesterov	(Russia) Traktor Chelyabinsk	Tampa Bay Lightning
D	87	Igor Ozhiganov	(Russia) CSKA Moscow
F	8	Nikita Gusev	(Russia) CSKA Moscow
F	9	Nikita Kucherov	(Russia) CSKA Moscow	Tampa Bay Lightning
F	10	Nail Yakupov	(Canada) Sarnia Sting	Edmonton Oilers
F	14	Daniil Apalkov	(Russia) Loko Yaroslavl
F	15	Pavel Kulikov	(Russia) Neftekhimik Nizhnekamsk
F	16	Ignat Zemchenko	(Russia) Severstal Cherepovets
F	17	Mikhail Grigorenko	(Canada) Quebec Remparts	Buffalo Sabres
F	18	Yaroslav Kosov	(Russia) Metallurg Magnitogorsk	Florida Panthers
F	19	Alexander Khokhlachev	(Canada) Windsor Spitfires	Boston Bruins
F	22	Sergei Barbashev	(Russia) CSKA Moscow
F	23	Ivan Telegin	(Canada) Barrie Colts	Winnipeg Jets
F	25	Evgeny Kuznetsov	(Russia) Traktor Chelyabinsk	Washington Capitals

=== Slovakia ===
- Head coach: (Slovakia) Ernest Bokroš

Pos.	No.	Player	Team	NHL Rights
GK	1	Juraj Šimboch	(Slovakia) HK Nitra
GK	2	Richard Sabol	(Slovakia) HC 05 Banská Bystrica
GK	30	Dominik Riečický	(Slovakia) HK Orange 20
D	3	Adam Jánošík	(Canada) Gatineau Olympiques	Tampa Bay Lightning
D	5	Peter Bezuška	(Czech Republic) HC Oceláři Třinec
D	6	Peter Trška	(Slovakia) HK Orange 20
D	7	Mário Kurali	(Slovakia) HK Orange 20
D	11	Michal Čajkovský	(Canada) Ottawa 67's
D	14	Peter Čerešňák	(Canada) Peterborough Petes	New York Rangers
D	21	Martin Marinčin	(Canada) Prince George Cougars	Edmonton Oilers
D	25	Martin Gernát	(Canada) Edmonton Oil Kings	Edmonton Oilers
F	8	Michal Toman	(United States) Traverse City North Stars
F	10	Matej Hinďoš	(Slovakia) HK Orange 20
F	12	Richard Mráz	(Slovakia) Tatranskí Vlci
F	13	Tomáš Jurčo	(Canada) Saint John Sea Dogs	Detroit Red Wings
F	16	Matej Bene	(Slovakia) HK Orange 20
F	17	Marek Tvrdoň	(Canada) Vancouver Giants	Detroit Red Wings
F	19	Vladimír Dolník	(United States) Everett Silvertips
F	20	Martin Ďaloga	(Slovakia) HK Orange 20
F	22	Miloš Bubela	(Slovakia) HK Orange 20
F	26	Matúš Chovan	(Slovakia) HC Košice
F	27	Tomáš Matoušek	(Slovakia) HK Orange 20
F	29	Marko Daňo	(Slovakia) HC Dukla Trenčín

=== Sweden ===
- Head coach: (Sweden) Roger Rönnberg

Pos.	No.	Player	Team	NHL Rights
GK	1	Anton Forsberg	(Sweden) Modo Hockey	Columbus Blue Jackets
GK	30	Johan Gustafsson	(Sweden) Luleå HF	Minnesota Wild
GK	35	Johan Mattsson	(Canada) Sudbury Wolves	Chicago Blackhawks
D	5	Mattias Bäckman	(Sweden) Linköpings HC	Detroit Red Wings
D	6	Oscar Klefbom	(Sweden) Färjestads BK	Edmonton Oilers
D	7	Fredrik Claesson	(Sweden) Djurgårdens IF	Ottawa Senators
D	8	Petter Granberg	(Sweden) Skellefteå AIK	Toronto Maple Leafs
D	9	John Klingberg	(Finland) Jokerit	Dallas Stars
D	12	Patrik Nemeth	(Sweden) AIK IF	Dallas Stars
D	25	Jonas Brodin	(Sweden) Färjestads BK	Minnesota Wild
F	10	Johan Larsson	(Sweden) Brynäs IF	Minnesota Wild
F	11	Jeremy Boyce-Rotevall	(Sweden) Timrå IK
F	13	Johan Sundström	(Sweden) Frölunda HC	New York Islanders
F	14	Max Friberg	(Sweden) Timrå IK	Anaheim Ducks
F	15	Sebastian Collberg	(Sweden) Frölunda HC
F	16	Filip Forsberg	(Sweden) Leksands IF
F	17	William Karlsson	(Sweden) Västerås IK	Anaheim Ducks
F	18	Victor Rask	(Canada) Calgary Hitmen	Carolina Hurricanes
F	19	Joakim Nordström	(Sweden) AIK	Chicago Blackhawks
F	20	Mika Zibanejad	(Sweden) Djurgårdens IF	Ottawa Senators
F	23	Ludvig Rensfeldt	(Canada) Sarnia Sting	Chicago Blackhawks
F	24	Rickard Rakell	(United States) Plymouth Whalers	Anaheim Ducks
F	28	Erik Thorell	(Sweden) Färjestads BK

=== Switzerland ===
- Head coach: (Switzerland) Manuele Celio

Pos.	No.	Player	Team	NHL Rights
GK	1	Tim Wolf	(Switzerland) GCK Lions
GK	20	Lukas Meili	(Switzerland) GCK Lions
GK	30	Luca Boltshauser	(Sweden) Färjestads BK (J20)
D	2	Cédric Hächler	(Sweden) Malmö Redhawks
D	4	Phil Baltisberger	(Switzerland) GCK Lions
D	5	Mike Vermeille	(Switzerland) Genève-Servette HC
D	7	Dave Sutter	(United States) Seattle Thunderbirds
D	8	Christian Marti	(Switzerland) Kloten Flyers
D	14	Dean Kukan	(Sweden) Luleå HF (J20)
D	17	Dario Trutmann	(United States) Plymouth Whalers
F	10	Alessio Bertaggia	(Canada) Brandon Wheat Kings
F	11	Gaëtan Haas	(Switzerland) EHC Biel
F	12	Lino Martschini	(Canada) Peterborough Petes
F	13	Grégory Hofmann	(Switzerland) HC Ambrì-Piotta	Carolina Hurricanes
F	15	Sven Bärtschi	(United States) Portland Winterhawks	Calgary Flames
F	19	Reto Amstutz	(Switzerland) SC Bern
F	22	Sven Andrighetto	(Canada) Rouyn-Noranda Huskies
F	23	Cédric Schneuwly	(Switzerland) EV Zug
F	24	Samuel Walser	(Switzerland) Kloten Flyers
F	25	Dario Simion	(Switzerland) HC Lugano
F	26	Joël Vermin	(Switzerland) SC Bern
F	28	Christoph Bertschy	(Switzerland) SC Bern
F	29	Tanner Richard	(Canada) Guelph Storm

== Group B ==
=== Canada ===
- Head coach: (Canada) Don Hay

Pos.	No.	Player	Team	NHL Rights
GK	29	Mark Visentin	(Canada) Niagara IceDogs	Phoenix Coyotes
GK	30	Scott Wedgewood	(United States) Plymouth Whalers	New Jersey Devils
D	2	Jamie Oleksiak	(United States) Saginaw Spirit	Dallas Stars
D	3	Brandon Gormley	(Canada) Moncton Wildcats	Phoenix Coyotes
D	4	Dougie Hamilton	(Canada) Niagara IceDogs	Boston Bruins
D	5	Mark Pysyk	(Canada) Edmonton Oil Kings	Buffalo Sabres
D	6	Scott Harrington	(Canada) London Knights	Pittsburgh Penguins
D	27	Ryan Murray	(United States) Everett Silvertips
D	28	Nathan Beaulieu	(Canada) Saint John Sea Dogs	Montreal Canadiens
F	8	Jaden Schwartz	(United States) Colorado College	St. Louis Blues
F	10	Michaël Bournival	(Canada) Shawinigan Cataractes	Montreal Canadiens
F	11	Jonathan Huberdeau	(Canada) Saint John Sea Dogs	Florida Panthers
F	12	Brendan Gallagher	(Canada) Vancouver Giants	Montreal Canadiens
F	13	Freddie Hamilton	(Canada) Niagara IceDogs	San Jose Sharks
F	14	Brett Connolly	(United States) Tampa Bay Lightning	Tampa Bay Lightning
F	15	Tanner Pearson	(Canada) Barrie Colts
F	16	Mark Stone	(Canada) Brandon Wheat Kings	Ottawa Senators
F	18	Ryan Strome	(Canada) Niagara IceDogs	New York Islanders
F	19	Mark Scheifele	(Canada) Barrie Colts	Winnipeg Jets
F	20	Boone Jenner	(Canada) Oshawa Generals	Columbus Blue Jackets
F	21	Quinton Howden	(Canada) Moose Jaw Warriors	Florida Panthers
F	22	Devante Smith-Pelly	(United States) Anaheim Ducks	Anaheim Ducks

=== Czech Republic ===
- Head coach: (Czech Republic) Miroslav Prerost

Pos.	No.	Player	Team	NHL Rights
GK	1	Libor Kašík	(Czech Republic) PSG Zlín
GK	2	Petr Mrázek	(Canada) Ottawa 67's	Detroit Red Wings
GK	30	Tomáš Král	(Finland) Kärpät (U20)
D	4	Jiří Říha	(Czech Republic) HC Benátky nad Jizerou
D	6	David Musil	(Canada) Vancouver Giants	Edmonton Oilers
D	7	Petr Zámorský	(Czech Republic) PSG Zlín
D	8	Vojtěch Mozík	(Czech Republic) BK Mladá Boleslav
D	12	Daniel Krejčí	(Czech Republic) HC Most
D	13	Marek Hrbas	(Canada) Kamloops Blazers
D	28	Bohumil Jank	(Slovakia) Lev Poprad
F	11	Michal Švihálek	(Czech Republic) HC České Budějovice (U20)
F	14	Jakub Culek	(Canada) Rimouski Océanic	Ottawa Senators
F	15	Daniel Přibyl	(Czech Republic) HC Sparta Praha	Montreal Canadiens
F	16	Radek Faksa	(Canada) Kitchener Rangers
F	17	Petr Holík	(Czech Republic) PSG Zlín
F	18	Tomáš Nosek	(Czech Republic) HC Pardubice
F	19	Tomáš Hertl	(Czech Republic) HC Slavia Praha
F	20	Dmitrij Jaškin	(Czech Republic) HC Slavia Praha	St. Louis Blues
F	21	Petr Straka	(Canada) Rimouski Océanic	Columbus Blue Jackets
F	22	Tomáš Filippi	(Canada) Baie-Comeau Drakkar
F	23	Dominik Uher	(United States) Spokane Chiefs	Pittsburgh Penguins
F	26	Jiří Sekáč	(Slovakia) Lev Poprad
F	27	Tomáš Hyka	(Canada) Gatineau Olympiques
F	29	Lukáš Sedlák	(Canada) Chicoutimi Saguenéens	Columbus Blue Jackets

=== Denmark ===
- Head coach: (Denmark) Todd Bjorkstrand

Pos.	No.	Player	Team	NHL Rights
GK	1	Dennis Jensen	(Denmark) EfB Esbjerg
GK	30	Sebastian Feuk	(Sweden) Timrå IK (J20)
GK	31	Christian Larsen	(Sweden) Malmö Redhawks (J20)
D	3	Jannik Christensen	(Denmark) EfB Esbjerg
D	4	Patrick Madsen	(Denmark) Herning Blue Fox
D	5	Tobias Hansen	(Denmark) Rødovre Mighty Bulls
D	6	Martin Rahbek	(Denmark) Herlev Eagles
D	9	Emil Kristensen	(Denmark) EfB Esbjerg
D	21	Mark Müller Larsen	(Denmark) Frederikshavn White Hawks
D	27	Anders Thode	(Denmark) Frederikshavn White Hawks
F	8	Thomas Spelling	(Denmark) Herning Blue Fox
F	11	Patrick Bjorkstrand	(Denmark) Herning Blue Fox
F	12	Oliver Bjorkstrand	(Denmark) Herning Blue Fox
F	13	Mathias Bau Hansen	(Denmark) Rødovre Mighty Bulls
F	14	Jonas Sass	(Denmark) Herlev Eagles
F	15	Nicolai Meyer	(Sweden) Malmö Redhawks (J20)
F	17	Nicklas Jensen	(Canada) Oshawa Generals	Vancouver Canucks
F	18	Thomas Søndergaard	(Denmark) Frederikshavn White Hawks
F	19	Mads Eller	(Sweden) Frölunda HC (J20)
F	22	Joachim Linnet	(Denmark) Herning Blue Fox
F	25	Rasmus Bjerrum	(Denmark) Frederikshavn White Hawks
F	26	Nicki Kisum	(Denmark) Hvidovre Ligahockey
F	28	Anders Schultz	(United States) Cedar Rapids RoughRiders

=== Finland ===
- Head coach: (Finland) Raimo Helminen

Pos.	No.	Player	Team	NHL Rights
GK	1	Richard Ullberg	(Finland) SaiPa
GK	30	Sami Aittokallio	(Finland) Ilves	Colorado Avalanche
GK	31	Christopher Gibson	(Canada) Chicoutimi Saguenéens	Los Angeles Kings
D	2	Olli Määttä	(Canada) London Knights
D	3	Simo-Pekka Riikola	(Finland) KalPa
D	4	Konsta Mäkinen	(Finland) Ilves
D	5	Rasmus Ristolainen	(Finland) TPS
D	7	Jani Hakanpää	(Finland) Blues	St. Louis Blues
D	8	Miro Hovinen	(Finland) Kiekko-Vantaa
D	12	Ville Pokka	(Finland) Kärpät
F	6	Teemu Pulkkinen	(Finland) Jokerit	Detroit Red Wings
F	9	Alexander Ruuttu	(Finland) Jokerit	Phoenix Coyotes
F	10	Joel Armia	(Finland) Ässät	Buffalo Sabres
F	11	Markus Granlund	(Finland) HIFK	Calgary Flames
F	13	Markus Hännikäinen	(Finland) Jokerit
F	14	Roope Hämäläinen	(Finland) SaiPa
F	15	Miro Aaltonen	(Finland) Blues
F	16	Aleksander Barkov	(Finland) Tappara
F	20	Mikael Granlund	(Finland) HIFK	Minnesota Wild
F	22	Miikka Salomäki	(Finland) Kärpät	Nashville Predators
F	27	Joonas Donskoi	(Finland) Kärpät	Florida Panthers
F	28	Mikael Kuronen	(Finland) Ilves
F	29	Otto Paajanen	(Finland) HPK

=== United States ===
- Head coach: (United States) Dean Blais

Pos.	No.	Player	Team	NHL Rights
GK	1	Jack Campbell	(Canada) Sault Ste. Marie Greyhounds	Dallas Stars
GK	35	John Gibson	(Canada) Kitchener Rangers	Anaheim Ducks
D	4	Derek Forbort	(United States) North Dakota Fighting Sioux	Los Angeles Kings
D	5	Adam Clendening	(United States) Boston University Terriers	Chicago Blackhawks
D	8	Jacob Trouba	(United States) U.S. NTDP
D	12	Kevin Gravel	(United States) St. Cloud State Huskies	Los Angeles Kings
D	15	Jon Merrill	(United States) Michigan Wolverines	New Jersey Devils
D	24	Jarred Tinordi	(Canada) London Knights	Montreal Canadiens
D	28	Stephen Johns	(United States) Notre Dame Fighting Irish	Chicago Blackhawks
F	2	Austin Czarnik	(United States) Miami RedHawks
F	3	Charlie Coyle	(Canada) Saint John Sea Dogs	Minnesota Wild
F	10	Emerson Etem	(Canada) Medicine Hat Tigers	Anaheim Ducks
F	11	J. T. Miller	(United States) Plymouth Whalers	New York Rangers
F	14	Bill Arnold	(United States) Boston College Eagles	Calgary Flames
F	16	Jason Zucker	(United States) Denver Pioneers	Minnesota Wild
F	19	T. J. Tynan	(United States) Notre Dame Fighting Irish	Columbus Blue Jackets
F	20	Kyle Rau	(United States) Minnesota Golden Gophers	Florida Panthers
F	21	Josh Archibald	(United States) Nebraska–Omaha Mavericks	Pittsburgh Penguins
F	22	Brandon Saad	(United States) Saginaw Spirit	Chicago Blackhawks
F	23	Connor Brickley	(United States) Vermont Catamounts	Florida Panthers
F	26	Austin Watson	(Canada) Peterborough Petes	Nashville Predators
F	27	Nick Bjugstad	(United States) Minnesota Golden Gophers	Florida Panthers
