= Ģirts Ankipāns =

Latvian ice hockey player and coach

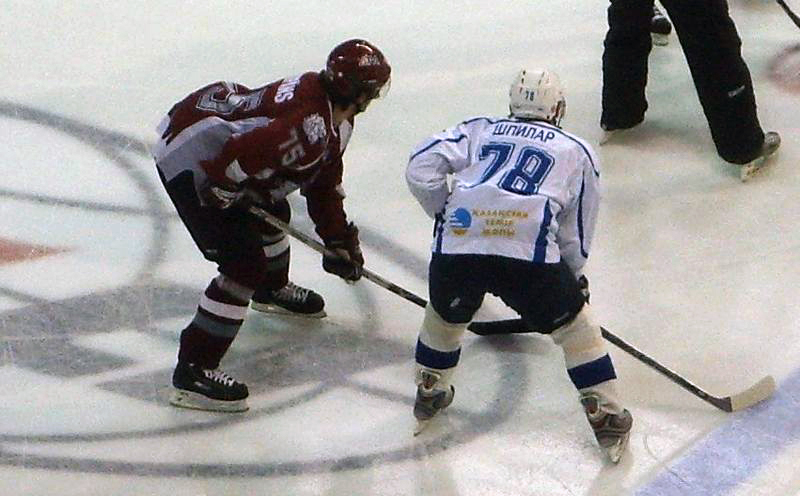
- Girts Ankipans
- Born: 29 November 1975 (age 49); Riga, Latvian SSR, Soviet Union
- Height: 6 ft 1 in (185 cm)
- Weight: 216 lb (98 kg; 15 st 6 lb)
- Position: Centre
- Shot: Left
- Played for: HK Essamika Ogre; ESC Harzer Wölfe Braunlage; EHC Neuwied; EHC Timmendorfer Strand; HK Riga 2000; EV Füssen; EV Landshut; Dinamo-2 Minsk; Dinamo Minsk; Dinamo Riga
- National team: Latvia
- Playing career: 1991–2013

Ģirts Ankipāns (born 29 November 1975) is a retired Latvian ice hockey player and coach. Currently he serves as the head coach of Dinamo Riga in KHL.

== Career ==
=== Playing career ===
He started his professional ice hockey career in Latvia, where he played for various local teams. During the 1996-97 season, he became the best goal-scorer of the Latvian Hockey League. Next 7 seasons Ankipāns spent playing in German hockey leagues. Before the 2003-04 season, he returned to Latvia and joined HK Riga 2000. He played five seasons with Dinamo Riga in KHL before retiring as player.

=== International career ===
He has played for the Latvia men's national ice hockey team in 2003, 2005 and 2009 World Championships as well as in 2006 Winter Olympics.

=== Coaching career ===
After ending his career as player Ankipāns joined Dinamo coaching staff as assistant coach. On September 28, 2017, he became the interim head coach of the team, replacing Sandis Ozoliņš. On March 29, 2018 Ankipāns was signed as the head coach.

== Career statistics ==
=== Regular season and playoffs ===
			Regular season					Playoffs
Season	Team	League	GP	G	A	Pts	PIM	GP	G	A	Pts	PIM
1991–92	HK Cēsis Vendenieki	LAT	12	3	3	6	4	—	—	—	—	—
1992–93	HK Essamika Ogre	LAT	22	43	35	78	67	—	—	—	—	—
1993–94	HK Essamika Ogre	LAT	21	20	22	42	69	3	3	1	4	12
1994–95	HK Essamika Ogre	LAT	24	17	22	39	46	—	—	—	—	—
1995–96	HK Essamika Ogre	LAT	29	19	14	33	64	—	—	—	—	—
1996–97	Juniors Rīga	EEHL	32	21	18	39	46	—	—	—	—	—
1996–97	Juniors Rīga	LAT	19	34	34	68	8	—	—	—	—	—
1997–98	Juniors Essamika Rīga	EEHL	4	2	2	4	4	—	—	—	—	—
1997–98	Lillehammer IK	NOR	6	2	4	6	4	—	—	—	—	—
1997–98	Harzer Wölfe Braunlage	DEU.2	36	24	32	56	63	—	—	—	—	—
1998–99	Harzer Wölfe Braunlage	DEU.2	29	4	15	19	26	—	—	—	—	—
1998–99	EHC Neuwied	DEU.2	24	10	18	28	38	—	—	—	—	—
1999–2000	EC Timmendorfer Strand	DEU.3	50	51	90	141	94	—	—	—	—	—
2000–01	EC Timmendorfer Strand	DEU.3	10	13	7	20	12	—	—	—	—	—
2001–02	HK Rīga 2000	EEHL	8	4	7	11	24	—	—	—	—	—
2001–02	EV Füssen	DEU.3	44	30	50	80	42	—	—	—	—	—
2002–03	Landshut Cannibals	DEU.2	40	15	25	40	34	—	—	—	—	—
2003–04	HK Rīga 2000	LAT	16	13	16	29	34	5	5	7	12	6
2003–04	HK Rīga 2000	EEHL	25	3	10	13	18	—	—	—	—	—
2004–05	HK Rīga 2000	BLR	42	13	25	38	46	3	0	0	0	2
2004–05	HK Rīga 2000	LAT	5	2	3	5	4	11	7	14	21	6
2005–06	HK Rīga 2000	BLR	41	10	30	40	38	6	0	5	5	6
2005–06	HK Rīga 2000	LAT		2	4	6	6	—	—	—	—	—
2006–07	Dinamo Minsk	BLR	23	3	4	7	4	—	—	—	—	—
2006–07	Dinamo–2 Minsk	BLR.2	1	0	4	4	0	—	—	—	—	—
2006–07	HK Rīga 2000	LAT	26	17	30	47	12		7	6	13
2007–08	HK Rīga 2000	LAT	28	12	25	37	8	7	3	5	8	4
2008–09	Dinamo Rīga	KHL	51	7	7	14	18	3	0	0	0	14
2008–09	HK Rīga 2000	BLR	1	0	0	0	0	—	—	—	—	—
2009–10	Dinamo Rīga	KHL	52	8	15	23	30	3	1	0	1	0
2010–11	Dinamo Rīga	KHL	50	6	14	20	36	11	1	1	2	4
2011–12	Dinamo Rīga	KHL	31	6	6	12	14	4	1	0	1	0
2012–13	Dinamo Rīga	KHL	18	1	0	1	10	—	—	—	—	—
2012–13	HK Liepājas Metalurgs	BLR	13	0	8	8	8	3	1	1	2	0
LAT totals			202	180	204	384	316	26	18	27	45	28
BLR totals			120	26	67	93	96	12	1	6	7	8
KHL totals			202	28	42	70	108	21	3	1	4	18

- LAT totals do not include numbers from the 2005–06 season, and 2006–07 playoffs.

=== International ===
Year	Team	Event	GP	G	A	Pts	PIM
1993	Latvia	EJC C1	4	0	1	1	4
1995	Latvia	WJC C1	4	2	0	2	4
2003	Latvia	WC	6	0	1	1	0
2005	Latvia	OGQ	3	0	1	1	0
2005	Latvia	WC	6	2	4	6	0
2006	Latvia	OG	5	0	0	0	0
2009	Latvia	OGQ	3	1	3	4	0
2009	Latvia	WC	7	1	2	3	6
2010	Latvia	OG	4	2	0	2	2
2011	Latvia	WC	6	0	0	0	2
Junior totals			8	2	1	3	8
Senior totals			40	6	11	17	10
