= Vitalijs Pavlovs =

Latvian professional ice hockey player (born 1989)

Vitālijs Pavlovs
- Born: 17 June 1989 (age 36) Riga, Soviet Union
- Height: 6 ft 5 in (196 cm)
- Weight: 216 lb (98 kg; 15 st 6 lb)
- Position: Right wing/Centre
- Shoots: Left
- OHL team Former teams: HK Prizma Riga; Beibarys Atyrau; Dinamo Riga; HK Olimp/Venta 2002; Dornbirn Bulldogs; JKH GKS Jastrzębie; HK Dukla Michalovce; HC 19 Humenné; Fife Flyers
- National team: Latvia
- NHL draft: Undrafted
- Playing career: 2007–present

Vitālijs Pavlovs (born 17 June 1989) is a Latvian professional ice hockey player who is currently playing for HK Prizma Riga in the Latvian Hockey Higher League.

== Playing career ==
Pavlovs signed a two-year contract with Dinamo Riga on August 9, 2012 and made his debut on December 5, 2012, in a loss to Yugra. Pavlovs started the 2012–13 season with Jokipojat in Mestis, he had 6 goals and 8 assists in 19 games which is good for 3rd place in points inside the team.

Pavlovs was sanctioned by the International Olympic Committee for failing an anti-doping test in the 2014 Sochi Winter Olympics. He tested positive for methylhexanamine, a banned stimulant found in certain food supplements.

On October 1, 2014, Pavlovs left Dinamo as a free agent to sign his first North American contract on a one-year deal with the Colorado Eagles of the ECHL.

== Career statistics ==
=== Regular season and playoffs ===
			Regular season					Playoffs
Season	Team	League	GP	G	A	Pts	PIM	GP	G	A	Pts	PIM
2005–06	Torpedo–2 Nizhny Novgorod	RUS.3	13	0	1	1	14	—	—	—	—	—
2007–08	SK LSPA/Rīga	LAT	41	5	6	11	16	3	0	0	0	2
2008–09	DHK Latgale	BLR	45	7	10	17	52	—	—	—	—	—
2008–09	DHK–2 Latgale	LAT	10	6	2	8	14	—	—	—	—	—
2008–09	DHK Latgale	LAT	—	—	—	—	—	9	4	2	6	12
2009–10	HK Liepājas Metalurgs	BLR	49	4	7	11	28	—	—	—	—	—
2009–10	HK Liepājas Metalurgs	LAT	—	—	—	—	—	8	1	2	3	12
2010–11	HK Liepājas Metalurgs	BLR	46	9	6	15	34	3	0	0	0	6
2010–11	HK Liepājas Metalurgs–2	LAT	6	6	3	9	0	6	6	3	9	0
2011–12	Beibarys Atyrau	KAZ	38	10	9	19	18	13	2	4	6	14
2012–13	Dinamo Rīga	KHL	15	0	1	1	8	—	—	—	—	—
2012–13	Jokipojat	FIN.2	22	8	10	18	39	—	—	—	—	—
2013–14	Dinamo Rīga	KHL	50	6	8	14	28	—	—	—	—	—
2014–15	Colorado Eagles	ECHL	71	17	17	34	29	7	2	1	3	2
2015–16	Dinamo Rīga	KHL	34	6	3	9	16	—	—	—	—	—
2016–17	Dinamo Rīga	KHL	53	0	4	4	24	—	—	—	—	—
2017–18	Dinamo Rīga	KHL	34	1	1	2	14	—	—	—	—	—
2018–19	Dinamo Rīga	KHL	61	2	4	6	21	—	—	—	—	—
2019–20	Dinamo Rīga	KHL	34	4	1	5	26	—	—	—	—	—
2020–21	HK Olimp/Venta 2002	LAT	8	2	4	6	2	—	—	—	—	—
2020–21	Dornbirn Bulldogs	ICEHL	12	0	4	4	6	6	1	1	2	2
2021–22	JKH GKS Jastrzębie	POL	39	11	24	35	69	15	2	7	9	22
2022–23	JKH GKS Jastrzębie	POL	1	0	0	0	0	—	—	—	—	—
2022–23	HK Dukla Michalovce	Slovak	33	7	8	15	30	11	0	3	3	6
BLR totals			140	20	23	43	114	3	0	0	0	6
KHL totals			281	19	22	41	137	—	—	—	—	—

=== International ===
Year	Team	Event	GP	G	A	Pts	PIM
2007	Latvia	WJC18	6	0	1	1	2
2008	Latvia	WJC D1	5	0	0	0	0
2009	Latvia	WJC	6	1	1	2	29
2013	Latvia	OGQ	3	0	0	0	0
2013	Latvia	WC	6	0	0	0	2
2014	Latvia	OG	5	0	1	1	0
2016	Latvia	WC	7	0	0	0	2
2016	Latvia	OGQ	3	0	0	0	2
2017	Latvia	WC	6	0	0	0	0
2018	Latvia	WC	8	0	0	0	2
Junior totals			17	1	2	3	31
Senior totals			38	0	1	1	8
