= Andrejs Maticins =

Latvian ice hockey player and coach

- Born: January 30, 1963 (age 63) Cherepovets, Russian SFSR, USSR
- Height: 5 ft 11 in (180 cm)
- Weight: 201 lb (91 kg; 14 st 5 lb)
- Position: Defence
- Shot: Left
- Played for: Dinamo Riga; Ässät; Lycksele SK; Tingsryds AIF; Nyköpings HK; Liepājas Metalurgs; Vilki
- National team: Latvia
- Playing career: 1982–2006

Andrejs Maticins (born January 30, 1963) is retired Latvian professional ice hockey player and coach, currently he is assistant coach for Severstal Cherepovets of the Kontinental Hockey League (KHL).

== Playing career ==
Maticins began his career in Dinamo Riga, he was a part of Dinamo Soviet Championship silver medal run in 1987-88 season. Later in his career, he played outside Latvia, mainly in Sweden.

=== International ===
During his career Maticins was regular for Latvian national team helping team Latvia in the promotion to World Championships elite division and playing in four world championships. He also represented Latvia in 2002 Winter Olympics. which was his last tournament with team Latvia.

== Coaching career ==
After finishing playing in 2006 Maticins began coaching. He coached Latvian national U20 team in 2009 Championships to 8th-place finish.

In 2013-14 season Maticins accepted job as assistant coach of Severstal Cherepovets.

== Career statistics ==
=== Regular season and playoffs ===
			Regular season					Playoffs
Season	Team	League	GP	G	A	Pts	PIM	GP	G	A	Pts	PIM
1980–81	Latvijas Berzs	URS.3		0
1981–82	Dinamo Rīga	URS	27	0	2	2	16	4	4	0	4	2
1981–82	Latvijas Berzs	URS.3	26	2	2	4	16	—	—	—	—	—
1982–83	Dinamo Rīga	URS	56	4	5	9	28	—	—	—	—	—
1983–84	Dinamo Rīga	URS	43	3	2	5	18	—	—	—	—	—
1984–85	Dinamo Rīga	URS	51	3	5	8	28	—	—	—	—	—
1985–86	Dinamo Rīga	URS	40	1	5	6	22	—	—	—	—	—
1986–87	Dinamo Rīga	URS	33	3	5	8	38	—	—	—	—	—
1987–88	Dinamo Rīga	URS	51	4	16	20	24	—	—	—	—	—
1988–89	Dinamo Rīga	URS	43	4	2	6	24	—	—	—	—	—
1989–90	Dinamo Rīga	URS	48	6	10	16	34	—	—	—	—	—
1990–91	Dinamo Rīga	URS	46	1	20	21	34	—	—	—	—	—
1991–92	Ässät	SM-l	41	4	17	21	32	8	0	2	2	8
1992–93	KooKoo	FIN.2	42	3	23	26	42	3	0	1	1	2
1994–95	Lycksele SK	SWE.3	20	14	26	40	59	—	—	—	—	—
1995–96	Lycksele SK	SWE.3	25	20	16	36	44	—	—	—	—	—
1996–97	Tingsryds AIF	SWE.2	32	9	9	18	42	—	—	—	—	—
1997–98	Tingsryds AIF	SWE.2	26	3	13	16	22	—	—	—	—	—
1998–99	Tingsryds AIF	SWE.2	34	8	20	28	44	—	—	—	—	—
1999–2000	IK Nyköping Hockey 90	Allsv	46	12	24	36	54	9	2	6	8	4
2000–01	IK Nyköping Hockey 90	Allsv	38	4	23	27	48	3	0	0	0	6
2001–02	IK Nyköping Hockey 90	Allsv	41	2	24	26	48	—	—	—	—	—
2002–03	Lycksele SK	SWE.3	20	3	11	14	51	—	—	—	—	—
2003–04	IK Nyköping Hockey 90	Allsv	12	1	1	2	20	—	—	—	—	—
2003–04	HK Liepājas Metalurgs	EEHL	14	2	4	6	2	—	—	—	—	—
2003–04	HK Liepājas Metalurgs	LAT	8	0	7	7	4	—	—	—	—	—
2004–05	Vilki OP	LAT	20	3	12	15	10	—	—	—	—	—
2005–06	Vilki OP	LAT		2	8	10	12	—	—	—	—	—
URS totals			438	29	72	101	266	—	—	—	—	—
SWE.2 totals			92	20	42	62	108	—	—	—	—	—
Allsv totals			137	19	72	91	170	12	2	6	8	10

=== International ===
Year	Team	Event	GP	G	A	Pts	PIM
1983	Soviet Union	WJC	7	0	1	1	2
1993	Latvia	WC C	6	4	5	9	8
1994	Latvia	WC B	7	2	2	4	2
1995	Latvia	WC B	7	1	3	4	2
1996	Latvia	WC B	7	1	4	5	0
1997	Latvia	WC	8	1	4	5	2
1998	Latvia	WC	6	0	1	1	8
1999	Latvia	WC	6	2	3	5	8
1999	Latvia	WC Q	3	0	0	0	0
2000	Latvia	WC	7	0	1	1	2
2001	Latvia	OGQ	3	0	0	0	6
2002	Latvia	OG	4	1	2	3	2
Senior totals			64	12	25	37	40
