= Ņikita Koļesņikovs =

Latvian ice hockey player

- Born: October 30, 1992 (age 33) Jelgava, Latvia
- Height: 6 ft 4 in (193 cm)
- Weight: 225 lb (102 kg; 16 st 1 lb)
- Position: Defence
- Shot: Left
- LHL team Former teams: HK Dinaburga; HK Rīga; Shawinigan Cataractes; Blainville-Boisbriand Armada; Banská Bystrica; Stjernen; HC Fassa; Odense Bulldogs; Kallinge-Ronneby IF; Västerviks IK; Dunaújvárosi Acélbikák; Edinburgh Capitals; Saint-Georges Cool FM 103.5; KS Cracovia; Melbourne Mustangs; HK Mogo; Roanoke Rail Yard Dawgs; HC Donbass; HK Zemgale/LLU
- National team: Latvia
- Playing career: 2012–2022

Ņikita Koļesņikovs (born October 30, 1992) is a Latvian professional ice hockey player, currently playing for HK Dinaburga of the Latvian Hockey Higher League (LHL).

== Playing career ==
Koļesņikovs began his career in Latvian junior teams he played in Dinamo Riga system with HK Riga as well.

In 2012 he joined Banská Bystrica of Slovak Extraliga. In 2013 he continued his career with Odense Bulldogs of AL-Bank Ligaen in Denmark, where he plays currently.

In January 2016, Kolesnikovs signed for the Edinburgh Capitals. Then, in July 2016, Kolesnikovs signed for Kongsvinger Knights of Norway's GET-ligaen. However, he quickly moved on to Canadian side Saint-Georges Cool FM 103.5 spending just over a season in North America before returning to Edinburgh to re-join the Capitals in November 2017.

Since leaving Edinburgh for a second time, Kolesnikovs has briefly played in Poland, Australia, Latvia, the United States and Ukraine.

=== International ===
Koļesņikovs represented Latvia at junior level in 2012 world championships.

== Career statistics ==
| | | | Regular season | | | | | Playoffs |
| Season | Team | League | GP | G | A | Pts | PIM | GP | G | A | Pts | PIM |
|---|---|---|---|---|---|---|---|---|---|---|---|---|
| 2007–08 | HS Riga 17 | Latvia U18 | 21 | 2 | 8 | 10 | 41 | — | — | — | — | — |
| 2008–09 | SK Riga 18 | Latvia | 22 | 2 | 7 | 9 | 51 | — | — | — | — | — |
| 2008–09 | SK Riga 18 | Latvia U20 | 20 | 4 | 6 | 10 | 32 | — | — | — | — | — |
| 2009–10 | SK Riga/Profs 18 | Latvia | 24 | 2 | 0 | 2 | 14 | — | — | — | — | — |
| 2010–11 | HK Riga | MHL | 38 | 1 | 3 | 4 | 8 | 2 | 0 | 0 | 0 | 0 |
| 2011–12 | Shawinigan Cataractes | QMJHL | 13 | 1 | 9 | 10 | 12 | — | — | — | — | — |
| 2011–12 | Blainville-Boisbriand Armada | QMJHL | 37 | 3 | 14 | 17 | 45 | 10 | 0 | 0 | 0 | 14 |
| 2012–13 | HC Banska Bystrica | Slovak | 6 | 0 | 1 | 1 | 4 | — | — | — | — | — |
| 2012–13 | Stjernen Hockey | Norway | 24 | 3 | 10 | 13 | 41 | 4 | 0 | 1 | 1 | 6 |
| 2013–14 | HC Fassa Falcons | Italy | 6 | 0 | 3 | 3 | 0 | — | — | — | — | — |
| 2013–14 | Odense Bulldogs | Denmark | 30 | 3 | 3 | 6 | 18 | 5 | 0 | 1 | 1 | 0 |
| 2014–15 | Kallinge-Ronneby IF | Hockeyettan | 4 | 0 | 1 | 1 | 2 | — | — | — | — | — |
| 2014–15 | Vasterviks IK | Hockeyettan | 12 | 2 | 3 | 5 | 6 | — | — | — | — | — |
| 2015–16 | Dunaújvárosi Acélbikák | MOL Liga | 3 | 0 | 0 | 0 | 0 | — | — | — | — | — |
| 2015–16 | Edinburgh Capitals | EIHL | 19 | 3 | 11 | 14 | 18 | — | — | — | — | — |
| 2016–17 | Saint-Georges Cool FM 103.5 | LNAH | 36 | 2 | 9 | 11 | 31 | 12 | 0 | 0 | 0 | 22 |
| 2017–18 | Saint-Georges Cool FM 103.5 | LNAH | 8 | 1 | 0 | 1 | 4 | — | — | — | — | — |
| 2017–18 | Edinburgh Capitals | EIHL | 22 | 4 | 5 | 9 | 55 | — | — | — | — | — |
| 2017–18 | Cracovia Krakow | Poland | 3 | 0 | 1 | 1 | 4 | 12 | 2 | 1 | 3 | 20 |
| 2017–18 | Melbourne Mustangs | AIHL | 20 | 4 | 16 | 20 | 43 | 1 | 0 | 0 | 0 | 0 |
| 2018–19 | Roanoke Rail Yard Dawgs | SPHL | 2 | 0 | 0 | 0 | 0 | — | — | — | — | — |
| 2019–20 | HK Mogo | Latvia | 17 | 4 | 7 | 11 | 24 | — | — | — | — | — |
| 2019–20 | Donbass Donetsk | Ukraine | 17 | 5 | 7 | 12 | 8 | 4 | 0 | 0 | 0 | 2 |
| 2020–21 | Donbass Donetsk | Ukraine | 26 | 0 | 10 | 10 | 2 | 9 | 0 | 2 | 2 | 2 |
| 2021–22 | HK Zemgale/LBTU | Latvia | 2 | 0 | 0 | 0 | 0 | — | — | — | — | — |
| 2021–22 | HK Dinaburga | Latvia | 9 | 0 | 2 | 2 | 12 | — | — | — | — | — |
| AIHL totals | | | 20 | 4 | 16 | 20 | 43 | 1 | 0 | 0 | 0 | 0 |
| Denmark totals | | | 30 | 3 | 3 | 6 | 18 | 5 | 0 | 1 | 1 | 0 |
| EIHL totals | | | 41 | 7 | 16 | 23 | 73 | — | — | — | — | — |
| Hockeyettan totals | | | 16 | 2 | 4 | 6 | 8 | — | — | — | — | — |
| LNAH totals | | | 44 | 3 | 9 | 12 | 35 | 12 | 0 | 0 | 0 | 22 |
| Latvia totals | | | 74 | 8 | 16 | 24 | 101 | — | — | — | — | — |
| Norway totals | | | 24 | 3 | 10 | 13 | 41 | 4 | 0 | 1 | 1 | 6 |
| Poland totals | | | 3 | 0 | 1 | 1 | 4 | 12 | 2 | 1 | 3 | 20 |
| Ukraine totals | | | 43 | 5 | 17 | 22 | 10 | 13 | 0 | 2 | 2 | 4 |
