= Kirils Tambijevs =

Latvian ice hockey player

- Born: February 4, 1992 (age 34) Riga, LV
- Height: 5 ft 10 in (178 cm)
- Weight: 163 lb (74 kg; 11 st 9 lb)
- Position: Forward
- Shot: Left
- KHL team (P) Cur. team Former teams: Dinamo Riga; HK Riga (MHL); SK Riga 18
- National team: Latvia
- Playing career: 2010–2025

Kirils Tambijevs (born February 4, 1992, in Riga, Latvia) is a Latvian ice hockey forward who has most recently played for Dinamo Riga of Latvian Hockey League. He has also played for Latvian National Junior team His father is former Latvian national team player and current HK Riga coach Leonids Tambijevs.

== Career statistics ==
			Regular season					Playoffs
Season	Team	League	GP	G	A	Pts	PIM	GP	G	A	Pts	PIM
2007–08	HS Rīga 17	Latvia U18	22	7	10	17	4	—	—	—	—	—
2008–09	SK Riga 18	Latvia	21	3	4	7	8	—	—	—	—	—
2008–09	SK Riga 18	Latvia U20	23	13	14	27	16	—	—	—	—	—
2009–10	SK Riga/Profs 18	Latvia	24	4	9	13	40	—	—	—	—	—
2010–11	HK Riga	MHL	49	2	8	10	28	2	0	0	0	4
2011–12	HK Riga	MHL	47	9	14	23	61	3	0	0	0	0
2011–12	HK Juniors Riga	Latvia	2	2	3	5	2	2	1	1	2	0
2012–13	Khimik Voskresensk	MHL	46	19	28	47	22	—	—	—	—	—
2013–14	HK Zemgale/LBTU	Latvia	4	1	3	4	0	—	—	—	—	—
2013–14	MHK Dynamo St. Petersburg	MHL	34	10	37	47	42	3	2	0	2	6
2014–15	Yuzhny Ural Orsk	VHL	3	0	0	0	0	—	—	—	—	—
2014–15	Saryarka Karagandy	VHL	21	2	7	9	12	3	0	0	0	2
2014–15	Berkut Karaganda	Kazakhstan	6	2	6	8	2	—	—	—	—	—
2015–16	Tukums HASC	Latvia	2	1	2	3	2	—	—	—	—	—
2015–16	SC Csíkszereda	MOL Liga	35	27	31	58	—	—	—	—	—	—
2015–16	SC Csíkszereda	Romania	22	26	25	51	28	8	7	13	20	12
2016–17	Dynamo St. Petersburg	VHL	36	7	27	34	78	13	7	7	14	74
2017–18	Dynamo St. Petersburg	VHL	8	2	7	9	30	—	—	—	—	—
2017–18	Saryarka Karagandy	VHL	20	6	9	15	24	6	2	2	4	10
2018–19	Torpedo Ust-Kamenogorsk	VHL	27	3	6	9	53	—	—	—	—	—
2018–19	Saryarka Karagandy	VHL	8	4	5	9	8	4	1	3	4	2
2019–20	HK Kurbads	Latvia	22	11	10	21	60	—	—	—	—	—
2020–21	HK Zemgale/LBTU	Latvia	27	20	32	52	16	—	—	—	—	—
2021–22	HK Zemgale/LBTU	Latvia	5	3	7	10	0	—	—	—	—	—
2021–22	Olimp Riga	Latvia	18	4	10	14	8	10	2	2	4	29
2022–23	Dinamo Riga	Latvia	6	5	2	7	10	9	7	2	9	39
2023–24	Tartu Kalev-Välk	Estonia	2	2	5	7	8	—	—	—	—	—
2024–25	Tartu Kalev-Välk	Estonia	6	4	10	14	39	—	—	—	—	—
VHL totals			123	24	61	85	205	26	10	12	22	88
Latvia totals			131	54	82	136	146	21	10	5	15	68
MHL totals			176	40	87	127	153	8	2	0	2	10
MOL Liga totals			35	27	31	58	—	—	—	—	—	—
Romania totals			22	26	25	51	28	8	7	13	20	12
