= Sergejs Pečura =

Latvian ice hockey player

- Born: June 14, 1987 (age 39) Riga, Latvian SSR, Soviet Union
- Height: 6 ft 2 in (188 cm)
- Weight: 192 lb (87 kg; 13 st 10 lb)
- Position: Forward
- Shoots: Left
- Latvia team Former teams: HK Dinaburga; SK LSPA/Riga; ASK Ogre; HK Riga 2000; Dinamo Riga; HC Neman Grodno; HK Liepājas Metalurgs; Levy Lviv; SMScredit.lv; HK Prizma Riga; Sakhalin Sea Lions; HK Kurbads; Étoile Noire de Strasbourg
- National team: Latvia
- Playing career: 2005–present

Sergejs Pečura (born 14 June 1987) is a Latvian professional ice hockey player, who currently plays for HK Dinaburga of the Latvian Hockey Higher League.

Pečura played four games in the Kontinental Hockey League for Dinamo Riga during the 2008–09 KHL season. He also had spells in Asia League Ice Hockey for Sakhalin Sea Lions and in the Ligue Magnus in France for Étoile Noire de Strasbourg. He also played for the Latvia men's national ice hockey team, playing in the 2010 and 2011 IIHF World Championship.
