= Vjačeslavs Fanduļs =

Latvian ice hockey player (born 1969)

- Born: March 17, 1969 (age 57) Leningrad, Russian SFSR, Soviet Union
- Height: 5 ft 10 in (178 cm)
- Weight: 187 lb (85 kg; 13 st 5 lb)
- Position: Center
- Played for: Dinamo Riga; Stars Riga; Ässät; HPK; TPS; Kärpät; Berlin Capitals; ASK Ogre; GC Küsnacht Lions; Traktor Chelyabinsk; Frederikshavn IK
- National team: Latvia
- Playing career: 1985–2013

Vjačeslavs Fanduļs (Russian: Вячеслав Викторович Фандуль; born March 17, 1969, in Leningrad, Soviet Union) is a Latvian former professional ice hockey forward.

== Playing career ==
Fanduļs began his career with RASMS Riga before playing in the Soviet Hockey League for Dinamo Riga and Stars Riga between 1988 and 1992. He then moved to Finland's SM-liiga with spells at Ässät, HPK, TPS, and Kärpät between 1992 and 2001.

Fanduļs then moved to Germany's Deutsche Eishockey Liga and signed for the Berlin Capitals. He played just one season in the DEL before returning to Ässät. He later returned to Latvia and played for ASK/Ogre.

He also played for the Latvian national team He represented Latvia in the 2002 Winter Olympics

== Career statistics ==
=== Regular season and playoffs ===
			Regular season					Playoffs
Season	Team	League	GP	G	A	Pts	PIM	GP	G	A	Pts	PIM
1985–86	RASMS Rīga	URS.3	6	0	0	0	2	—	—	—	—	—
1986–87	RASMS Rīga	URS.3	68	33	15	48	44	—	—	—	—	—
1987–88	RASMS Rīga	URS.3	59	41	18	59	78	—	—	—	—	—
1988–89	Dinamo Rīga	URS	22	7	5	12	2	—	—	—	—	—
1988–89	RASMS-Energo Rīga	URS.3	28	23	8	31	46	—	—	—	—	—
1989–90	Dinamo Rīga	URS	46	11	7	18	16	—	—	—	—	—
1990–91	Dinamo Rīga	URS	46	26	12	38	10	—	—	—	—	—
1991–92	Stars Rīga	CIS	28	14	5	19	20	—	—	—	—	—
1991–92	Mayak Kuibyshev	CIS.3	2	3	2	5	2	—	—	—	—	—
1992–93	Ässät	SM-l	47	20	23	43	56	8	2	0	2	6
1993–94	Ässät	SM-l	48	20	26	46	36	5	3	4	7	4
1994–95	HPK	SM-l	3	0	1	1	2	—	—	—	—	—
1994–95	TPS	SM-l	32	12	15	27	45	13	8	3	11	0
1995–96	TPS	SM-l	49	22	29	51	55	11	2	6	7	18
1995–96	Rīga Allianse	LAT	—	—	—	—	—		7	7	14
1996–97	Ässät	SM-l	48	18	30	48	65	4	1	1	2	25
1997–98	Ässät	SM-l	47	15	27	42	59	3	0	1	1	0
1998–99	Ässät	SM-l	54	9	18	27	45	—	—	—	—	—
1999–2000	Kärpät	FIN.2	46	22	40	62	60	7	5	3	8	6
2000–01	Kärpät	SM-l	50	7	11	18	32	—	—	—	—	—
2000–01	Berlin Capitals	DEL	59	13	12	25	69	—	—	—	—	—
2002–03	Ässät	SM-l	44	12	13	25	54	—	—	—	—	—
2003–04	Ässät	SM-l	54	13	18	31	104	—	—	—	—	—
2004–05	Sport	Mestis	43	13	25	38	32	11	3	2	5	52
2005–06	ASK/Ogre	LAT		5	1	6	4	—	—	—	—	—
2005–06	GCK Lions	SUI.2	7	1	5	6	6	—	—	—	—	—
2005–06	Traktor Chelyabinsk	RUS.2	29	9	8	17	32	10	3	4	7	4
2006–07	Frederikshavn White Hawks	DEN	21	6	16	22	14	5	2	5	7	8
2007–08	Frederikshavn White Hawks	DEN	43	18	26	44	60	15	1	9	10	8
2008–09	ASK/Ogre	BLR	43	18	16	34	74	—	—	—	—	—
2009–09	ASK/Ogre	LAT	—	—	—	—	—	12	8	8	16	14
2009–10	HK Ogre	LAT	1	0	0	0	2	—	—	—	—	—
2011–12	Karhu HT	FIN.4	—	—	—	—	—	12	8	10	18	16
2012–13	Karhu HT	FIN.4	12	7	6	13	12	—	—	—	—	—
2012–13	Karhu HT	FIN.3	5	0	1	1	4	—	—	—	—	—
URS/CIS total			142	58	29	87	48	—	—	—	—	—
SM-l total			476	148	211	359	553	44	16	15	31	53

=== International ===
Year	Team	Event	GP	G	A	Pts	PIM
1993	Latvia	OGQ	4	3	1	4	12
1994	Latvia	WC B	7	3	6	9	8
1995	Latvia	WC B	7	6	9	15	8
1996	Latvia	WC B	7	3	5	8	6
1999	Latvia	WC	6	3	3	6	12
1999	Latvia	WC Q	3	1	0	1	2
2000	Latvia	WC	4	0	3	3	2
2001	Latvia	OGQ	3	1	1	2	0
2001	Latvia	WC	6	1	1	2	4
2002	Latvia	OG	4	4	0	4	2
2002	Latvia	WC	6	1	1	2	4
2003	Latvia	WC	6	2	0	2	4
2004	Latvia	WC	7	1	2	3	4
Senior totals			70	29	32	61	68
