= Andris Džeriņš =

Latvian ice hockey player (born 1988)

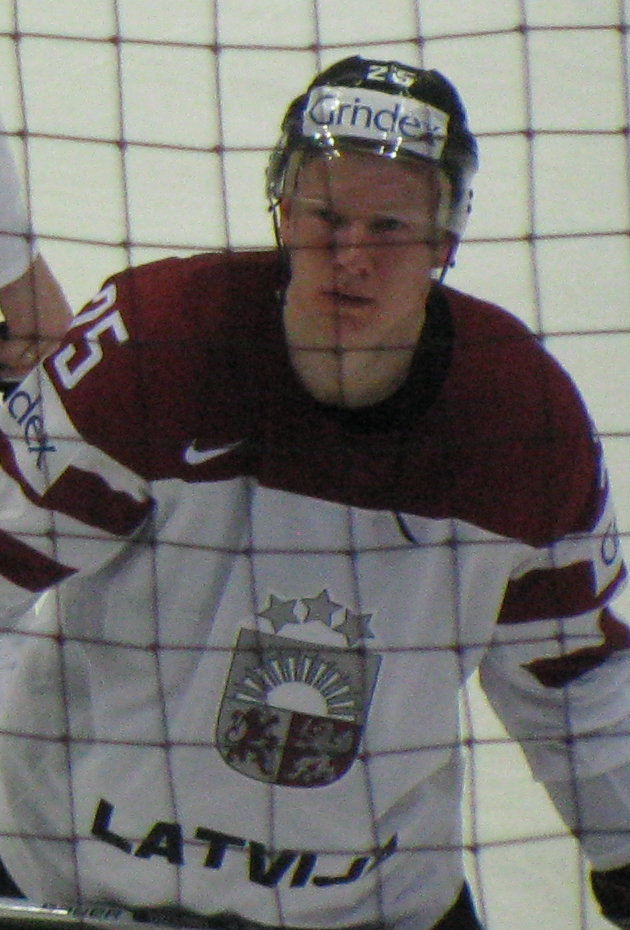
- Born: February 14, 1988 (age 38) Jēkabpils, Latvian SSR, Soviet Union
- Height: 6 ft 1 in (185 cm)
- Weight: 192 lb (87 kg; 13 st 10 lb)
- Position: Forward
- Shoots: Left
- ICEHL team Former teams: Steinbach Black Wings 1992; Dinamo Riga; Mountfield HK
- National team: Latvia
- NHL draft: Undrafted
- Playing career: 2004–present

Andris Džeriņš (born February 14, 1988) is a Latvian professional ice hockey player who is a forward for Steinbach Black Wings 1992 of the ICE Hockey League (ICEHL).

== Playing career ==
He previously played two seasons of North American junior hockey with the Kingston Frontenacs of the Ontario Hockey League. He has also spent two seasons in the Czech Extraliga with Mountfield HK and 10 seasons in the Kontinental Hockey League (KHL) with Dinamo Riga.

== International play ==
Medal record

Representing Latvia

Ice hockey

World Championships
Bronze medal – third place	2023 Finland/Latvia	

Džeriņš represented Latvia at the 2023 IIHF World Championship where he recorded three assists and won a bronze medal, Latvia's first ever IIHF World Championship medal.

== Career statistics ==
=== Regular season and playoffs ===
			Regular season					Playoffs
Season	Team	League	GP	G	A	Pts	PIM	GP	G	A	Pts	PIM
2003–04	HK LB 69 Rīga	LAT U18	—	7	20	27	—	—	—	—	—	—
2004–05	HK Rīga 2000	LAT U18	—	24	19	43	6	—	—	—	—	—
2004–05	HK Rīga 2000	LAT	17	2	8	10	8	—	—	—	—	—
2004–05	HK Rīga 2000	BLR	2	0	0	0	0	—	—	—	—	—
2005–06	Stocksunds IF	J18 Allsv	13	6	8	14	10	—	—	—	—	—
2006–07	Lukko	FIN U20	38	9	13	22	22	—	—	—	—	—
2007–08	Kingston Frontenacs	OHL	61	20	30	50	44	—	—	—	—	—
2008–09	Kingston Frontenacs	OHL	65	21	27	48	93	—	—	—	—	—
2009–10	HK Dinamo/Juniors	BLR	14	3	7	10	2	—	—	—	—	—
2009–10	Dinamo Rīga	KHL	17	0	0	0	0	—	—	—	—	—
2009–10	HK Dinamo/Juniors	LAT	—	—	—	—	—	9	5	6	11	4
2010–11	Dinamo Rīga	KHL	32	3	2	5	8	6	1	0	1	0
2011–12	Dinamo Rīga	KHL	9	0	0	0	0	—	—	—	—	—
2012–13	Dinamo Rīga	KHL	52	8	9	17	24	—	—	—	—	—
2013–14	Dinamo Rīga	KHL	43	4	4	8	46	6	2	0	2	0
2014–15	Dinamo Rīga	KHL	52	8	3	11	32	—	—	—	—	—
2015–16	Dinamo Rīga	KHL	50	10	5	15	24	—	—	—	—	—
2016–17	Mountfield HK	ELH	35	14	8	22	30	8	3	1	4	4
2017–18	Mountfield HK	ELH	41	7	17	24	28	10	2	2	4	16
2018–19	Dinamo Rīga	KHL	62	11	12	23	40	—	—	—	—	—
2019–20	Dinamo Rīga	KHL	52	3	8	11	41	—	—	—	—	—
2020–21	Dinamo Rīga	KHL	16	2	4	6	31	—	—	—	—	—
2021–22	Steinbach Black Wings Linz	ICEHL	22	6	5	11	6	—	—	—	—	—
KHL totals			385	49	47	96	246	12	3	0	3	0

=== International ===
Year	Team	Event	GP	G	A	Pts	PIM
2005	Latvia	U18 D1	5	0	0	0	2
2006	Latvia	U18 D1	5	6	7	13	4
2007	Latvia	WJC D1	5	6	3	9	0
2008	Latvia	WJC D1	5	4	2	6	2
2010	Latvia	WC	6	0	1	1	4
2011	Latvia	WC	6	0	5	5	2
2012	Latvia	WC	4	0	0	0	4
2013	Latvia	WC	7	0	2	2	4
2014	Latvia	WC	7	0	1	1	2
2015	Latvia	WC	7	1	1	2	6
2016	Latvia	WC	7	1	4	5	14
2016	Latvia	OGQ	3	3	0	3	2
2017	Latvia	WC	6	4	1	5	2
2018	Latvia	WC	8	3	2	5	10
2021	Latvia	WC	7	0	1	1	4
2021	Latvia	OGQ	2	0	0	0	0
2022	Latvia	OG	3	0	0	0	2
2022	Latvia	WC	7	2	1	3	2
2023	Latvia	WC	6	0	3	3	2
Junior totals			20	16	12	28	8
Senior totals			86	14	22	36	58
