= 2010–11 Latvian Hockey League season =

2010–11 Latvian Hockey League
- League: Latvian Hockey Higher League
- Sport: Ice hockey
- Number of teams: 9

Regular season
- Winners: HK Ozolnieki/Monarhs

Playoffs

Finals
- Champions: HK Liepājas Metalurgs
- Runners-up: HK Ozolnieki/Monarhs

Latvian Hockey League seasons
- ← 2009–10 2011–12 →

The 2010–11 Latvian Hockey League season was the 20th season of the Latvian Hockey League, the top level of ice hockey in Latvia. Nine teams participated in the league, and HK Liepājas Metalurgs won the championship.

== Regular season ==
	Club	GP	W	OTW	OTL	L	GF:GA	Pts
1.	(Latvia) HK Ozolnieki/Monarhs	32	28	2	0	2	236:77	88
2.	(Latvia) HK Liepājas Metalurgs II	32	23	0	2	7	178:76	71
3.	(Latvia) DHK Latgale	32	21	1	2	8	161:76	67
4.	(Latvia) HK SMScredit	32	19	2	1	10	172:116	62
5.	(Latvia) HK Zemgale/JLSS	32	14	2	2	14	103:136	48
6.	(Lithuania) SC Energija	32	12	2	3	15	118:123	43
7.	(Latvia) HS Prizma	32	6	2	1	23	90:169	23
8.	(Latvia) HS Riga/LSPA	32	4	1	2	25	78:234	16
9.	(Latvia) HK Ogre	32	4	1	0	27	73:202	14

== Playoffs ==
Quarterfinals

- HK Ozolnieki/Monarhs - HS Riga/LSPA 2–0 on series
- HK SMScredit - HK Zemgale/JLSS 2–0 on series
- HK Liepajas Metalurgs - HS Prizma 2–0 on series
- DHK Latgale - SC Energija 2–0 on series

Semifinals

- HK Ozolnieki/Monarhs - HK SMScredit 3–0 on series
- HK Liepajas Metalurgs - DHK Latgale 3–1 on series

Final

- HK Liepajas Metalurgs - HK Ozolnieki/Monarhs 4–0 on series
