= Kristiāns Pelšs =

Latvian ice hockey player

- Born: 9 September 1992 Preiļi, Latvia
- Died: 11 June 2013 (aged 20) Riga, Latvia
- Height: 5 ft 11 in (180 cm)
- Weight: 191.4 lb (87 kg; 13 st 9 lb)
- Position: Forward
- Shot: Left
- Played for: DHK Latgale; Oklahoma City Barons
- NHL draft: 181st overall, 2010; Edmonton Oilers
- Playing career: 2008–2013

Kristiāns Pelšs (9 September 1992 – 11 June 2013) was a Latvian ice hockey player. He was the son of poet and translator Einārs Pelšs. At the time of his death, he played for the Oklahoma City Barons of the American Hockey League (AHL) as a prospect of the Edmonton Oilers of the National Hockey League.

== Playing career ==
Pelšs was selected by the Edmonton Oilers in the 7th round (181st overall) of the 2010 NHL entry draft. He made his European Elite debut with DHK Latgale of the Belarusian Extraleague during the 2008–09 season. In 2010, he moved to North America and signed to play major junior hockey in the Western Hockey League (WHL) with the Edmonton Oil Kings.

Pelšs participated at the 2012 World Junior Ice Hockey Championships as a member of the Latvia men's national junior ice hockey team.

On 1 May 2012, it was announced that Pelšs signed a three-year entry-level contract with the Edmonton Oilers.

== Death ==
On 11 June 2013, Pelšs drowned in the Daugava River after leaping from the Stone Bridge in Riga, Latvia. It was confirmed that Pelšs' death was accidental.

The Oil Kings established the Kristians Pelss Memorial Award in his honour, which is given "to the player who best exemplifies the traits" of Pelss.

== Career statistics ==
=== Regular season and playoffs ===
			Regular season					Playoffs
Season	Team	League	GP	G	A	Pts	PIM	GP	G	A	Pts	PIM
2008–09	DHK Latgale	LHL	31	3	4	7	14	—	—	—	—	—
2009–10	Dinamo-Juniors Riga	BXL	46	6	3	9	28	—	—	—	—	—
2010–11	Edmonton Oil Kings	WHL	63	14	19	33	31	4	0	2	2	6
2011–12	Edmonton Oil Kings	WHL	63	28	22	50	95	10	4	3	7	2
2012–13	Oklahoma City Barons	AHL	20	1	7	8	8	—	—	—	—	—
2012–13	Stockton Thunder	ECHL	13	2	3	5	15	—	—	—	—	—
AHL totals			20	1	7	8	8	—	—	—	—	—
ECHL totals			13	2	3	5	15	—	—	—	—	—
WHL totals			126	42	41	83	126	21	5	7	12	10

Medal record

Representing Latvia

Ice hockey

IIHF World U18 Championship
Gold medal – first place	2009 Italy	Division I Group B

World Junior Ice Hockey Championships
Gold medal – first place	2011 Belarus	Division I Group A

=== International ===
Year	Team	Event	GP	G	A	Pts	PIM
2009	Latvia	U18 D1	4	0	1	1	6
2010	Latvia	U18	6	2	1	3	0
2011	Latvia	WJC D1	5	2	2	4	31
2012	Latvia	WJC	6	1	2	3	8
Junior totals			21	5	6	11	45

== See also ==
- List of ice hockey players who died during their careers
