= 2021–22 Latvian Hockey League season =

2021–22 Latvian Hockey League
- League: Latvian Hockey Higher League
- Sport: Ice hockey
- Duration: 4 September 2021 – 18 April 2022
- Number of teams: 7
- TV partner(s): TV4, Sportacentrs.com, LTV7

Regular season
- Winners: HK MOGO

Playoffs

Finals
- Champions: HK Zemgale/JLSS
- Runners-up: HK Olimp

Latvian Hockey League seasons
- ← 2020–21 2022–23 →

The 2021–22 Latvian Hockey League season was the 31st season of the Latvian Hockey League, the top level of ice hockey in Latvia. HK Zemgale/JLSS won their first championship.

== Teams ==
Team	City
HK Dinaburga	Daugavpils
HK Liepāja	Liepāja
HK MOGO	Rīga
HK Olimp	Rīga
HS Rīga	Rīga
HK Prizma	Rīga
HK Zemgale/LLU	Jelgava

== Regular season ==
Pos	Team	Pld	W	OTW	OTL	L	GF	GA	GD	Pts	Final Result
1	HK MOGO	36	29	2	3	2	201	62	+139	65	Advance to Playoffs
2	HK Zemgale/JLSS	36	26	4	1	5	178	88	+90	61	Advance to Playoffs
3	HK Liepāja	36	22	3	2	9	142	81	+61	52	Advance to Playoffs
4	HK Olimp	36	18	3	3	12	130	106	+24	45	Advance to Playoffs
5	HS Rīga	36	7	2	1	26	88	159	−71	19	
6	HK Dinaburga	36	4	1	3	28	78	185	−107	13	
7	HK Prizma	36	5	0	2	29	94	230	−136	12	

Source: Latvian Ice Hockey Federation

== Results ==
Home	Away						
Home	MOGO	Liepāja	Dinaburga	Zemgale/JLSS	Olimp	Rīga	Prizma
HK MOGO	–	3–4 OT; W–0; 5–1	10–0; 3–2; 5–4	6–0; 4–5 OT; 2–3	3–1; 7–2; 2–1 OT	8–2; 7–3; 4–1	10–2; 10–1; 12–2
HK Liepāja	1–4; 1–2; 3–4 GWS	–	5–2; 2–1 OT; W–0	2–3; 1–4; 6–1	0–3; 3–4; 3–2 OT	8–0; 5–1; W–0	5–2; 9–1; 7–1
HK Dinaburga	0–7; 0–10; 0–6	2–3; 1–2; 2–7	–	5–8; 1–4; 4–5 GWS	1–3; 3–5; 3–5	3–5; 0–3; W–0	1–5; 4–11; 3–6
HK Zemgale/JLSS	1–2; 3–1; 6–5 OT	3–4; 5–3; 2–5	6–2; 4–1; 6–2	–	2–1; 3–4 OT; 7–1	11–3; 5–0; 6–2	10–1; 4–2; 10–0
HK Olimp	1–3; 1–6; 2–5	1–3; 1–5; 6–5 OT	8–3; 2–3; 9–2	4–7; 2–3 GWS; 1–4	–	2–1; 8–2; 3–2	9–1; 9–6; 5–2
HS Rīga	2–7; 0–8; 2–3	4–5; 3–7; 3–6	6–2; 3–4; 6–5 OT	1–7; 2–8; 3–4	1–2 GWS; 0–1; 0–4	–	5–3; 7–3; 0–4
HK Prizma	0–12; 1–7; 4–8	1–5; 3–12; 1–4	9–2; 3–6; 3–4 OT	2–7; 1–5; 2–6	3–4; 1–6; 1–7	3–4 OT; 2–7; 1–4	–
OT - Overtime. GWS - Shootout.

== Play-off bracket ==
Semi-finals
1	HK MOGO	2
4	HK Olimp	4
2	HK Zemgale/JLSS	4
3	HK Liepāja	2

Finals
4	HK Olimp	0
2	HK Zemgale/JLSS	4

=== Semi-finals ===
HK MOGO – HK Olimp 2-4
18.03.2022	HK MOGO	HK Olimp	1-2 OT
20.03.2022	HK Olimp	HK MOGO	6-1
22.03.2022	HK Olimp	HK MOGO	3-2
24.03.2022	HK Olimp	HK MOGO	1-2
26.03.2022	HK MOGO	HK Olimp	2-3
28.03.2022	HK Olimp	HK MOGO	4-3 OT
HK Olimp won the series 4–2.

HK Zemgale/JLSS – HK Liepāja 4-2
19.03.2022	HK Zemgale/JLSS	HK Liepāja	1-2 OT
21.03.2022	HK Zemgale/JLSS	HK Liepāja	4-3 OT
23.03.2022	HK Liepāja	HK Zemgale/JLSS	1-4
25.03.2022	HK Liepāja	HK Zemgale/JLSS	1-3
27.03.2022	HK Zemgale/JLSS	HK Liepāja	1-2 OT
29.03.2022	HK Liepāja	HK Zemgale/JLSS	3-4 OT
HK Zemgale/JLSS won the series 4–2.

=== Finals ===
HK Olimp – HK Zemgale/JLSS 0–4
04.04.2022	HK Zemgale/JLSS	HK Olimp	5-0
06.04.2022	HK Zemgale/JLSS	HK Olimp	3-2 OT
08.04.2022	HK Olimp	HK Zemgale/JLSS	2-3
11.04.2022	HK Olimp	HK Zemgale/JLSS	1-3
HK Zemgale/JLSS won the series 0–4.

== Final rankings ==
Gold medal	HK Zemgale/JLSS
Silver medal	HK Olimp
Bronze medal	HK MOGO
4	HK Liepāja
5	HS Rīga
6	HK Dinaburga
7	HK Prizma
