= 2006–07 Latvian Hockey League season =

2006–07 Latvian Hockey League
- League: Latvian Hockey Higher League
- Sport: Ice hockey
- Number of teams: 7

Regular season
- Winners: ASK/Ogre

Playoffs

Finals
- Champions: HK Riga 2000
- Runners-up: ASK/Ogre

Latvian Hockey League seasons
- ← 2005–06 2007–08 →

The 2006–07 Latvian Hockey League season was the 16th season of the Latvian Hockey League, the top level of ice hockey in Latvia. Six teams participated in the league, and HK Riga 2000 won the championship.

== Regular season ==
	Club	GP	W	OTW	OTL	L	GF:GA	Pts
1.	(Latvia) ASK/Ogre	40	27	1	3	9	179:113	86
2.	(Latvia) HK Liepājas Metalurgs	40	23	4	3	10	161:113	80
3.	(Latvia) HK Riga 2000	40	23	4	2	11	180:118	79
4.	(Latvia) SK Riga 20	40	17	0	0	23	160:172	51
5.	(Latvia) DHK Latgale	40	13	2	3	22	127:132	46
6.	(Lithuania) SC Energija	40	5	1	1	33	104:263	18

== Playoffs ==
Quarterfinals (Best of Three)
4	(Latvia) SK Riga 20	2
5	(Latvia) DHK Latgale	1
3	(Latvia) HK Riga 2000	2
6	(Lithuania) SC Energija	0

Semifinals (Best of Five)
1	(Latvia) ASK/Ogre	3
4	(Latvia) SK Riga 20	1
2	(Latvia) HK Liepājas Metalurgs	0
3	(Latvia) HK Riga 2000	3

Final (Best of Seven)
1	(Latvia) ASK/Ogre	2
3	(Latvia) HK Riga 2000	4
Third place
2	HK Liepājas Metalurgs	2
4	SK Riga 20	0
