= LB/Prizma Riga =

Latvian ice hockey club

LB/Prizma Rīga
- City: Riga, Latvia
- League: Latvian Hockey League
- Founded: 1962
- Home arena: Rīgas sporta pils

Franchise history
- 1962-1995: Latvijas Bērzs
- 1995-2000: LB/Essamika
- 1997-2002: LB/Prizma Riga
- 2002-: HK LB 69 Riga

Latvijas Bērzs Riga is an ice hockey team in Riga, Latvia. They played in the Latvian Hockey League, and formerly played in the USSR's Pervaya Liga. Currently, the remnants of the team are affiliated with either HK Prizma Rīga or HK Sāga and a sports school by the name of Latvijas Bērzs currently exists in Riga.

== History ==
In the early 1960s the furniture manufacturing company Latvijas Bērzs (today - Latvijas Finieris), founded an ice hockey team in Soviet-occupied Latvia. They first participated the Latvian SSR Championship in 1962. They won the Latvian SSR Championship ten times in the 1970s and 1980s.

The club played in the Soviet Vtoraya Liga (Second League) from 1974-1978, but were promoted to the Pervaya Liga (First League) for two years (1979 and 1980) before they were again relegated to the Vtoraya Liga.

After the restoration of Latvian independence, the club participated in the now professional Latvian Hockey League. They won the league title in 1997, before partnering up with HK Prizma. After 2002, an LB amateur team played in the second division, and youth teams have taken part in activities, usually within the HK Sāga or Prizma clubs.

== Achievements ==
- Latvian SSR champion 1974, 1975, 1977-1980, 1983-1985
- USSR Vtoraya Liga champion 1978
- Latvian champion 1997

== Season-by-season record ==
Season	League	GP	W	L	T	Pts	GF–GA
1974/75	Vtoraya Liga West	52	17	7	28	41	211:240
1975/76	Vtoraya Liga West	52	19	28	5	43	205:237
1976/77	Vtoraya Liga West	52	25	19	8	58	253:190
1977/78	Vtoraya Liga West	52	42	8	2	86	323:132
1978/79	Pervaya Liga	60	16	37	7	39	190:263
1979/80	Pervaya Liga	60	6	46	8	22	167:329
1980/81	Vtoraya Liga West	60	34	24	2	70	281:256
1981/82	Vtoraya Liga West	44	19	22	3	41	188:190
1982/83	Vtoraya Liga West	52	20	30	2	42	212:265
1983/84	Vtoraya Liga West	52	29	20	3	61	240:190
1984/85	Vtoraya Liga West	52	19	23	10	48	194:208

== Notable players ==
- Artūrs Irbe
- Miķelis Rēdlihs
- Mārtiņš Karsums
- Oskars Bārtulis
- Ģirts Ankipāns
- Jānis Andersons
- Guntis Galviņš
- Andris Džeriņš
