= Kristers Freibergs =

Latvian ice hockey player

- Born: July 3, 1992 (age 32); Liepāja, Latvia
- Height: 6 ft 1 in (185 cm)
- Weight: 192 lb (87 kg; 13 st 10 lb)
- Position: Defence
- Shoots: Left
- MHL team Former teams: HK Riga; HK Liepājas Metalurgs (BXL)
- NHL draft: Undrafted
- Playing career: 2010–present

Kristers Freibergs
Medal record

Representing Latvia

Ice hockey

IIHF World U18 Championship
Gold medal – first place	2009 Italy	Division I Group B

Kristers Freibergs (born July 3, 1992) is a Latvian professional ice hockey defenceman. He is currently playing for HK Riga of the Russian Minor Hockey League.

Freibergs made his European Elite debut with HK Liepājas Metalurgs of the Belarusian Extraleague during the 2010-11 season.

He participated at the 2012 World Junior Ice Hockey Championships as a member of the Latvia men's national junior ice hockey team.
