= 2003–04 Latvian Hockey League season =

2003–04 Latvian Hockey League
- League: Latvian Hockey Higher League
- Sport: Ice hockey
- Number of teams: 9

Regular season
- Winners: HK Riga 2000

Playoffs

Finals
- Champions: HK Riga 2000
- Runners-up: ASK/Ogre

Latvian Hockey League seasons
- ← 2002–03 2004–05 →

The 2003–04 Latvian Hockey League season was the 13th season of the Latvian Hockey League, the top level of ice hockey in Latvia. Nine teams participated in the league, and HK Riga 2000 won the championship.

== Regular season ==
=== Group A ===
	Club	GP	W	T	L	GF:GA	Pts
1.	(Latvia) HK Riga 2000	22	17	2	3	144:47	36
2.	(Latvia) ASK/Ogre	22	17	0	5	132:68	34
3.	(Latvia) HK Liepājas Metalurgs	22	13	2	7	164:71	28
4.	(Lithuania) SC Energija	22	10	3	9	117:120	23

=== Group B ===
	Club	GP	W	T	L	GF:GA	Pts
1.	(Latvia) HK Vilki Riga	24	17	1	6	169:72	35
2.	(Latvia) HK Zemgale	24	10	0	14	90:129	20
3.	(Latvia) Prizma/Riga 86	24	8	0	16	61:124	16
4.	(Latvia) HK Riga 85	24	5	0	19	44:183	10
5.	(Latvia) SK Ozollapas	24	2	0	22	36:143	4

== Playoffs ==
Quarterfinals

- SC Energija - HK Vilki Riga 2-1 on series
- ASK/Ogre - Prizma/Riga 86 2-0 on series
- HK Liepajas Metalurgs - HK Zemgale 2-0 on series
- HK Riga 2000 - HK Riga 85 2-0 on series

Semifinals

- ASK/Ogre - SC Energija 2-0 on series
- HK Riga 2000 - HK Liepajas Metalurgs 2-1 on series

Final

- HK Riga 2000 - ASK/Ogre 2-0 on series

3rd place

- HK Liepajas Metalurgs - SC Energija 2-1 on series

=== 5th place ===
	Club	GP	W	T	L	GF:GA	Pts
1.	(Latvia) HK Vilki Riga	2	2	0	0	8:3	4
2.	(Latvia) HK Zemgale	2	1	0	1	10:7	2
3.	(Latvia) HK Riga 85	2	0	0	2	2:10	0
