= 2007–08 Latvian Hockey League season =

2007–08 Latvian Hockey League
- League: Latvian Hockey Higher League
- Sport: Ice hockey
- Number of teams: 7

Regular season
- Winners: HK Liepājas Metalurgs

Playoffs

Finals
- Champions: HK Liepājas Metalurgs
- Runners-up: ASK/Ogre

Latvian Hockey League seasons
- ← 2006–07 2008–09 →

The 2007–08 Latvian Hockey League season was the 17th season of the Latvian Hockey League, the top level of ice hockey in Latvia. Seven teams participated in the league, and HK Liepājas Metalurgs won the championship.

== Regular season ==
	Club	GP	W	OTW	OTL	L	GF:GA	Pts
1.	(Latvia) HK Liepājas Metalurgs	42	36	2	3	1	224:95	113
2.	(Latvia) ASK/Ogre	42	23	6	2	11	194:145	83
3.	(Latvia) HK Riga 2000	42	24	4	2	12	162:116	82
4.	(Latvia) SK LSPA/Riga	42	13	6	6	17	168:179	57
5.	(Latvia) DHK Latgale	42	15	1	5	21	134:147	52
6.	(Estonia) Tartu Big Diamonds	42	14	2	5	21	133:149	51
7.	(Lithuania) SC Energija	42	1	0	0	41	93:277	3

== Playoffs ==
Quarterfinals (Best of Three)
4	(Latvia) SK LSPA/Riga	1
5	(Latvia) DHK Latgale	2
3	(Latvia) HK Riga 2000	2
6	(Estonia) Tartu Big Diamonds	0

Semifinals (Best of Five)
1	(Latvia) HK Liepājas Metalurgs	3
5	(Latvia) DHK Latgale	0
2	(Latvia) ASK/Ogre	3
3	(Latvia) HK Riga 2000	1

Final (Best of Seven)
1	(Latvia) HK Liepājas Metalurgs	4
2	(Latvia) ASK/Ogre	0
Third place
5	(Latvia) DHK Latgale	0
3	(Latvia) HK Riga 2000	2
