= Metalurgs Liepāja =

Metalurgs Liepāja may refer to:

- FK Liepājas Metalurgs, a professional Latvian football club
- HK Liepājas Metalurgs, a professional Latvian ice hockey club
