= Pelšs =

Origin
- Origin: Latvian

Pelšs (feminine: Pelša) is a Latvian topographic surname. Individuals with the surname include:

- Kristiāns Pelšs (1992–2013), Latvian ice hockey player;
- Valdis Pelšs (born 1967), Soviet and Russian television presenter of Latvian descent
