= HK Dinaburga =

Ice hockey team in Daugavpils, Latvia

- City: Daugavpils, Latvia
- League: 1. līga (LHF); 2024 - present 2014 - 2018
- Founded: 2013
- Home arena: Daugavpils Ice Arena (capacity: 1984)
- Colours: Black, gold, red, white
- President: Valērijs Haritonovs
- General manager: Edgars Petrovs
- Head coach: Ivans Kokins
- Captain: Vladislavs Barkovskis
- Website: HK Dinaburga

Franchise history
- 2013 - 2018: Daugavpils
- 2018 - present: HK Dinaburga

HK Dinaburga are a professional Latvian ice hockey team that plays in the Latvian Hockey First League, the second tier of the sport in Latvia. The team is based in Daugavpils and play their home games at the Daugavpils Ice Arena.

== History ==
The team was founded in 2013, initially playing in the Latvian Hockey Higher League under the name HK Daugavpils. The previous team in the city, DHK Latgale, folded at the culmination of the 2011-12 season. They began play in the Latvian Hockey League, the top tier of hockey in Latvia, during the 2013-14 season, however, they performed poorly winning only one game. Following this, the team dropped down a league to the newly formed Latvian 1st Division where they remained until 2019. Daugavpils would find more success in the second tier of Latvian hockey, winning the league in 2016, and finishing top of the table in the regular season in both 2017 and 2019. Following the culmination of the 2019 Daugavpils changed their name to HK Dinaburga, taking the moniker of a nearby castle, and rejoined the Latvian Hockey League, now known as the Optibet Hockey League for sponsorship reasons. In their first season back in the top tier, Dinaburga were in 6th place out of 8 teams before the play-offs were cancelled due to the COVID-19 pandemic.

== Roster ==
Updated February 11, 2021.

Goaltenders
| Number | | Player | Catches | Acquired | Place of Birth |
|---|---|---|---|---|---|
| 31 | (Latvia) | Uldis Čalpa | L | 2020 | Ogresgals, Latvia |
| 22 | (Latvia) | Aleksejs Čerikovs | L | 2017 | - |
| 1 | (Russia) | Kirill Kuzmin | L | 2020 | Moscow, Russia |
| 54 | (Latvia) | Marks Slavinskis | L | 2020 | Riga, Latvia |

Defencemen
| Number | | Player | Shoots | Acquired | Place of Birth |
|---|---|---|---|---|---|
| 5 | (Latvia) | Ernests Azarevičs | R | 2017 | - |
| 4 | (Latvia) | Deniss Berbniks | R | 2020 | Riga, Latvia |
| 19 | (Russia) | Egor Egorov | L | 2020 | Bryansk, Russia |
| 72 | (Russia) | Timofej Fillipov | L | 2019 | Tyumen, Russia |
| 16 | (Latvia) | Mārtiņš Jakovļevs (C) | L | 2019 | Jēkabpils, Latvia |
| 55 | (Latvia) | Edgars Adriāns Kazaks | R | 2020 | - |
| 14 | (Latvia) | Edgars Mamajs | L | 2016 | - |
| 11 | (Latvia) | Jegors Mateiko | L | 2020 | Riga, Latvia |
| 16 | (Latvia) | Artūrs Tomsons | L | 2020 | Cēsis, Latvia |
| 2 | (Latvia) | Vladimirs Zaicevs | R | 2020 | - |
| 96 | (Latvia) | Imants Leščovs | R | 2019 | Daugavpils, Latvia |

Forwards
| Number | | Player | Shoots | Position | Acquired | Place of Birth |
|---|---|---|---|---|---|---|
| 26 | (Latvia) | Vladislavs Barkovskis (A) | L | F | 2015 | - |
| 81 | (Lithuania) | Kristupas Blazys | L | F | 2020 | Rokiškis, Lithuania |
| 28 | (Latvia) | Nikolajs Fetisovs | L | F | 2020 | - |
| 55 | (Latvia) | Ivo Haritonovs | L | F | 2018 | - |
| 88 | (Latvia) | Haims Joffe | L | F | 2016 | - |
| 13 | (Latvia) | Jānis Ričards Kārkliņš | R | F | 2020 | - |
| 6 | (Latvia) | Romāns Keda | R | F | 2019 | - |
| 21 | (Russia) | Aleksandr Klisunov | L | F | 2019 | Elektrostal, Russia |
| 191 | (Latvia) | Ivans Kokins | L | F | 2013 | - |
| 99 | (Russia) | Sergej Melnikov | R | LW | 2020 | Yaroslavl, Russia |
| 16 | (Latvia) | Mikus Noviks | R | F | 2020 | - |
| 96 | (Russia) | Ilya Olonov | R | LW | 2020 | Moscow, Russia |
| 3 | (Latvia) | Aleksis Ostaņkovičs | R | F | 2019 | Riga, Latvia |
| 7 | (Latvia) | Artjoms Pankevičs | L | C | 2020 | Riga, Latvia |
| 77 | (Latvia) | Sergejs Pečura (A) | L | C | 2019 | Liepāja, Latvia |
| 12 | (Latvia) | Edgars Petrovs | L | F | 2020 | Daugavpils, Latvia |
| 12 | (Russia) | Dmitrii Seliutin | R | F | 2020 | - |
| 17 | (Latvia) | Artjoms Tretjakovs | L | F | 2018 | - |
| 10 | (Latvia) | Renāts Vabiščevs | L | F | 2013 | Daugavpils, Latvia |
| 8 | (Latvia) | Vadims Vabiščevs | L | F | 2014 | Krāslava, Latvia |
| 71 | (Latvia) | Gļebs Voino | L | F | 2020 | - |

== Season-by-season record ==
Note: GP = Games played, W = Wins, L = Losses, T = Ties, OTL = Overtime losses, Pts = Points, GF = Goals for, GA = Goals against, PIM = Penalties in minutes

| Season | League | GP | W | L | T | OTW | OTL | Pts | GF | GA | Finish | Playoffs |
| 2015-16 | Latvia2 | 24 | 17 | 3 | — | 2 | 2 | 57 | 155 | 62 | 2nd | Champion |
| 2016-17 | Latvia2 | 24 | 20 | 2 | — | 1 | 1 | 63 | 169 | 71 | 1st | Bronze medal winner |
| 2017-18 | Latvia2 | 16 | 8 | 6 | — | 1 | 1 | 27 | 82 | 53 | 5th | Did not qualify |
| 2018-19 | Latvia2 | 32 | 22 | 4 | — | 4 | 2 | 76 | 182 | 76 | 1st | Bronze medal game loss. |
| 2019-20 | Optibet Hockey League | 35 | 8 | 21 | — | 1 | 5 | 23 | 85 | 161 | 6th | Playoffs cancelled |

== Team records ==
=== Career ===
These are the top five scorers in HK Dinaburga history.

Note: Pos = Position; GP = Games played; G = Goals; A = Assists; Pts = Points

| Player | Pos | GP | G | A | Pts |
| Vadims Vabiscevics | F | 112 | 82 | 121 | 203 |
| Artūrs Kuzmenkovs | F | 69 | 58 | 131 | 189 |
| Renats Vabiscevics | F | 134 | 67 | 110 | 177 |
| Ivans Kokins | F | 92 | 54 | 78 | 132 |
| Vladislavs Barkovskis | F | 132 | 51 | 54 | 105 |

Penalty minutes: Maris Lescovs, 182

=== Season ===
==== Regular season ====
- Most goals in a season: Artūrs Kuzmenkovs, 35 (2018-19)
- Most assists in a season: Artūrs Kuzmenkovs, 66 (2018-19)
- Most points in a season: Artūrs Kuzmenkovs, 101 (2018-19)
- Most penalty minutes in a season: Maris Lescovs, 86 (2019–20)

==== Playoffs ====
- Most goals in a playoff season: Daniil Kulikov, 10 (2015–16)
- Most assists in a playoff season: Daniil Kulikov, 12 (2015–16)
- Most points in a playoff season: Daniil Kulikov, 22 (2015–16)
- Most penalty minutes in a playoff season: Artūrs Kuzmenkovs, 36 (2018-19)
