= 2005–06 Latvian Hockey League season =

2005–06 Latvian Hockey League
- League: Latvian Hockey Higher League
- Sport: Ice hockey
- Number of teams: 7

Regular season
- Winners: ASK/Ogre

Playoffs

Finals
- Champions: HK Riga 2000
- Runners-up: HK Liepājas Metalurgs

Latvian Hockey League seasons
- ← 2004–05 2006–07 →

The 2005–06 Latvian Hockey League season was the 15th season of the Latvian Hockey League, the top level of ice hockey in Latvia. Seven teams participated in the league, and HK Riga 2000 won the championship.

== Regular season ==
	Club	GP	W	OTW	OTL	L	GF:GA	Pts
1.	(Latvia) ASK/Ogre	30	24	3	0	3	141:60	81
2.	(Latvia) HK Riga 2000	30	19	1	1	9	135:93	60
3.	(Latvia) DHK Latgale	30	13	2	4	11	127:75	47
4.	(Latvia) HK Liepājas Metalurgs	30	13	0	1	16	114:160	40
5.	(Latvia) HK Vilki OP Riga	30	7	4	3	16	85:119	32
6.	(Latvia) SK Riga 20	30	8	1	3	18	99:133	29
7.	(Lithuania) SC Energija	30	8	2	1	19	96:157	29

== Playoffs ==
=== Quarterfinals ===
- (Latvia) HK Riga 2000 - (Lithuania) SC Energija 2:0
- (Latvia) DHK Latgale - (Latvia) SK Riga 20 2:0
- (Latvia) HK Liepājas Metalurgs - (Latvia) HK Vilki Riga 2:0

=== Semifinals ===
- (Latvia) HK Riga 2000 - (Latvia) DHK Latgale 3:0
- (Latvia) ASK/Ogre - (Latvia) HK Liepājas Metalurgs 0:3

=== 3rd place ===
- (Latvia) ASK/Ogre - (Latvia) DHK Latgale 0:2

=== Final ===
- (Latvia) HK Riga 2000 - (Latvia) HK Liepājas Metalurgs 4:1
