= Daugavpils Ice Arena =

Ice arena in Daugavpils, Latvia

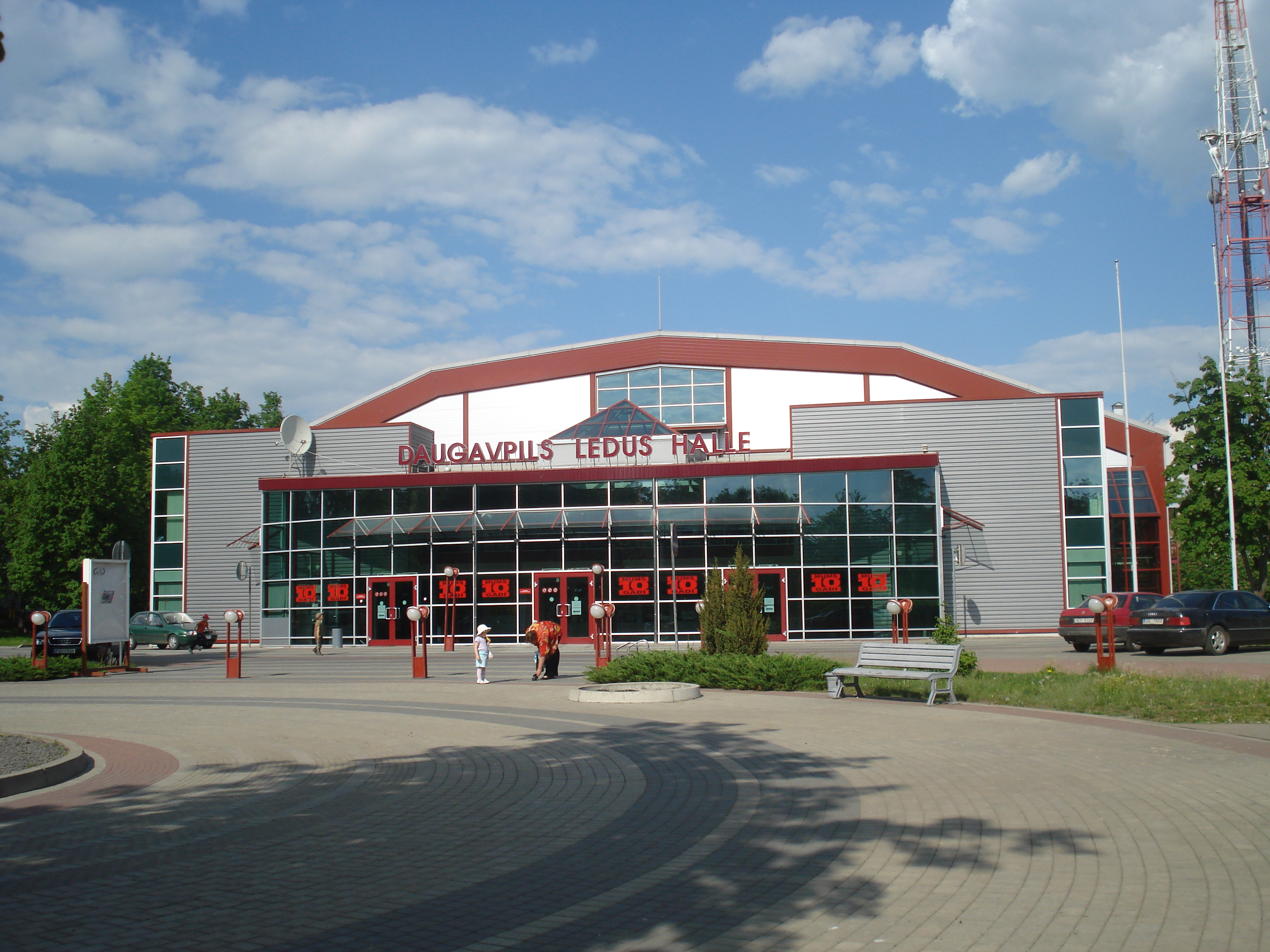
- Interactive map of Daugavpils Ice Arena
- Location: Daugavpils, Latvia
- Coordinates: 55°52′19.5″N 26°31′48″E
- Capacity: 1,984

Construction
- Groundbreaking: May, 1999
- Opened: November 16, 1999

Tenants
- HK Dinaburga (LHHL) (2013–present); DHK Latgale (BHL/LHHL) (2003–2012)

Daugavpils Ice Arena is an ice arena in Daugavpils, Latvia. The construction works were started in early 1999, but the arena was opened already on 16 November 1999. There are 1234 seats and 750 standing places. It is the home arena for HK Dinaburga, which is playing in the Latvian Hockey Higher League.
