= Lukáš Pék =

Slovak ice hockey player

- Born: September 2, 1987 (age 37); Bratislava, Czechoslovakia
- Height: 6 ft 2 in (188 cm)
- Position: Left wing
- Slovak Extraliga team: HC Slovan Bratislava
- Playing career: 2000–present

Lukáš Pék (born September 2, 1987) is a Slovak former professional ice hockey player who played with HC Slovan Bratislava in the Slovak Extraliga.
