= Artūrs Kuzmenkovs =

Latvian ice hockey player

- Born: December 1, 1993 (age 32) Daugavpils, LAT
- Height: 6 ft 2 in (188 cm)
- Weight: 185 lb (84 kg; 13 st 3 lb)
- Position: C/RW
- Shoots: Left
- 2. Divisioona team: Kraft
- National team: Latvia
- Playing career: 2011–present

Artūrs Kuzmenkovs (born December 1, 1993) is a Latvian ice hockey forward who plays for Kraft in the 2. Divisioona.

== Playing career ==
He started his professional career with Liepājas Metalurgs. On June 9, 2013, Kuzmenkovs signed a two-year contract with Dinamo Rīga. On September 5 of 2013/14 season he played his first game in KHL in win against Dinamo Minsk.

=== International ===
Kuzmenkovs played in several world junior championships with the Latvian national team.
