= Tartu Big Diamonds =

Estonian ice hockey team

- City: Tartu, Estonia
- League: Latvian Hockey Higher League, Estonia Cup
- Founded: 2007
- Folded: 2008
- Home arena: Lõunakeskus Ice Hall
- Colours

The Tartu Big Diamonds were an Estonian professional ice hockey team who played in the Latvian Hockey Higher League (Samsung premjerliga). They were founded in 2007, and played their first game, a friendly match against Eesti Noortekoondis on the 6th of August in 2007 in Narva. the Big Diamonds won the game 20 to 2. The club played 10 of the team's home games in Tartu, 4 in Narva, 4 in Tallinn, and 2 in Kohtla-Järve. They dissolved in the summer of 2008 due to financial problems.

== Final roster ==
Goaltenders
| # | | Player | Pos. | Catches | Height | Weight | Place of Birth |
| | (Estonia) | Andrei Bondrov | G | | 177 cm | 75 kg | Narva, Estonia |
| | (Estonia) | Mark Rajevski | G | L | 171 cm | 78 kg | Tallinn, Estonia |
| | (Estonia) | Aleksei Terentjev | G | L | 178 cm | 78 kg | Narva, Estonia |

Defensemen
| # | | Player | Pos. | Shoots | Height | Weight | Place of Birth |
| | (Estonia) | Artjom Abramov | D | L | 191 cm | 88 kg |
| | (Latvia) | Kristaps Buzats | D | L | 182 cm | 80 kg | Liepāja, Latvia |
| | (Estonia) | Sergei Gulov | D | L | 198 cm | 94 kg |
| | (Estonia) | Kirill Kolpakov | D | L | 187 cm | 88 kg |
| | (Estonia) | Aleksandr Ossipov | D | R | 179 cm | 82 kg | Narva, Estonia |
| | (Estonia) | Mark Samorukov | D | L | 189 cm | 99 kg | Tallinn, Estonia |
| | (Estonia) | Oleg Smirnov | D | L | 188 cm | 78 kg | Narva, Estonia |
| | (Estonia) | Ilja Urõšev | D | L | 188 cm | 92 kg | Tallinn, Estonia |

Forwards
| # | | Player | Pos. | Shoots | Height | Weight | Place of Birth |
| | (Russia) | Aleksandr Sidorenkov | F | R | 180 cm | 93 kg |
| | (Estonia) | Maksim Brandis | F | L | 172 cm | 72 kg |
| | (Estonia) | Ilja Iljin | F | | 182 cm | 85 kg | Narva, Estonia |
| | (Estonia) | Anton Jastrebov | F | L | 189 cm | 82 kg | Narva, Estonia |
| | (Estonia) | Deniss Konoshev | F | L | 184 cm | 89 kg | Toronto, Ontario, Canada |
| | (Estonia) | Dmitri Lavrov | F | L | 179 cm | 84 kg |
| | (Latvia) | Viktors Lobacovs | F |
| | (Czech Republic) | Filip Mleko | F | L | 178 cm | 81 kg |
| | (Estonia) | Alexander Polozov | F | R | 168 cm | 73 kg | Kohtla-Järve, Estonia |
| | (Estonia) | Jan Rajevski | F | L | 177 cm | 84 kg |
| | (Estonia) | Aleksei Sibirtsev | F | L | 178 cm | 78 kg | Narva, Estonia |
| | (Estonia) | Aleksandr Sidorenkov | F | | 175 cm | 70 kg |

== Notable players ==
- D 4 (Estonia) Aleksandr Ossipov 07.08.1987 175/80
- D 7 (Estonia) Kirill Kolpakov 19.07.1982
- F 10 (Estonia) Aleksei Sibirtsev 05.12.1987 180/75
- F 13 (Estonia) Maksim Brandis 30.08.1988 175/80
- D 14 (Estonia) Anton Levkovitsh 25.04.1983 182/76
- F 17 (Russia) Dmitri Lavrov 17.10.1984 178/82
- F 19 (Estonia) Aleksandr Polozov 16.04.1986 175/80
- F 21 (Estonia) Ilja Iljin 15.08.1987 180/77
- F 23 (Estonia) Anton Jastrebov 05.03.1988 180/77
- F 25 (Latvia) Viktors Lobacovs 15.04.1986
- F 27 (Estonia) Oleg Puzanov 19.01.1967 176/76
- D 28 (Latvia) Kristaps Bužāts 04.01.1989
- F -- (Estonia) Deniss Konosev 24.03.1983 184/89
- D -- (Slovakia) Robert Pukalovic 11.07.1984 185/82
- F -- (Estonia) Oleg Puzanov 19.01.1967 176/67
- D -- (Estonia) Ilja Urõšev 16.06.1987 184/79

== Notable coaches ==
- C -- (Latvia) Leonīds Beresņevs 06.07.1958 (to ASK Ogre)
