= Mário Kurali =

Slovak ice hockey defenceman

- Born: 17 January 1992 (age 34) Stará Ľubovňa, Czechoslovakia
- Height: 6 ft 0 in (183 cm)
- Weight: 187 lb (85 kg; 13 st 5 lb)
- Position: Defence
- Shot: Right
- Played for: HK Orange 20; HK Poprad; MsHK Žilina; Aigles de Nice; MHk 32 Liptovský Mikuláš; HKM Zvolen
- Playing career: 2011–2022

Mário Kurali (born 17 January 1992) is a Slovak former professional ice hockey defenceman.

== Career ==
Kurali began his career with HK Poprad, playing in their U18 and U20 teams from 2006 to 2010. He was then drafted 45th overall by the Acadie–Bathurst Titan of the Quebec Major Junior Hockey League in the 2010 CHL Import Draft. He played two seasons with the Titan with a spell with HK Orange 20 in between before returning to Poprad.

Kurali would spend the next three seasons with Poprad before joining MsHK Žilina on July 7, 2015. He returned to Poprad once more a year later before moving to Aigles de Nice in France's Ligue Magnus on December 12, 2016. On June 29, 2017, Kurali went back to Slovakia and signed for MHk 32 Liptovský Mikuláš.

On February 10, 2020, Kurali moved to HKM Zvolen for the remainder of the 2019–20 Tipsport Liga season which would eventually end prematurely due to the COVID-19 pandemic. On July 21, 2020, Kurali returned to MHk 32 Liptovský Mikuláš.

== International play ==
Kurali played in the 2012 World Junior Ice Hockey Championships for Slovakia, playing all six games in the competition without scoring a point.

== Career statistics ==
=== Regular season and playoffs ===
			Regular season					Playoffs
Season	Team	League	GP	G	A	Pts	PIM	GP	G	A	Pts	PIM

=== International ===
Year	Team	Event	Result	GP	G	A	Pts	PIM
2012	Slovakia	WJC	6th	6	0	0	0	0
Junior totals				6	0	0	0	0
