= HK Zemgale/LBTU =

Ice hockey team in Jelgava, Latvia

- City: Jelgava, Latvia
- League: OHL
- Founded: 2002
- Home arena: Jelgava Ice hall (capacity: 1,500)
- Colours: Blue, red, white
- President: Armands Ozollapa
- Head coach: Artis Ābols
- Captain: Rustams Begovs
- Parent club: Dinamo Riga (OHL)
- Website: hkzemgale.lv

Franchise history
- 2002–2003: ASK/Zemgale
- 2003–present: HK Zemgale

Championships
- Latvian Hockey Higher League: 2 (2021–22, 2022–23)

HK Zemgale/LBTU is a professional ice hockey team based in Jelgava, Latvia. The team competes in the Latvian Hockey Higher League, the top tier of ice hockey in Latvia. The team plays its home games at the Jelgava Ice hall.

== History ==
The team was founded in 2002, shortly after the opening of the Jelgava Ice hall, in cooperation with the Ministry of Defence. The team was initially called ASK/Zemgale, and joined the Latvian Hockey Higher League, in addition the team also participated in Division 2 of the Eastern European Hockey League during the 2002–03 season. At the culmination of the season, financial issues meant that the team split in two, with the ASK franchise relocating to Ogre, creating ASK/Ogre, whilst the Zemgale side of the partnership remained in the town, operating under the name HK Zemgale. The team remained in the Latvian first tier for two further seasons before disbanding following the culmination of the 2004–05 season.

Zemgale remained inactive until the 2010–11 season, when they reformed and returned to the Latvian top tier, where they have played since. Usually a mid-table team, HK Zemgale's most successful season came in the 2017-18 season where they made it to the play-off final, ultimately losing to HK Kurbads, under Head Coach Haralds Vasiljevs.

In 2013, the team established a partnership with the Latvia University of Life Sciences and Technologies (Latvian: Latvijas Lauksaimniecības universitāte (LLU)). In addition, Zemgale also serve as the farm team to the KHL's Dinamo Riga. During the 2020/21 season, David Levin played a handful of games for the team whilst under contract with Dinamo.

== Roster ==
Updated February 11, 2021.

Goaltenders
Number		Player	Catches	Acquired	Place of Birth
30	(Latvia)	Mariuss Bajaruns-Galejs	L	2018	Riga, Latvia
1	(Latvia)	Rihards Cimermanis	L	2016	Riga, Latvia
45	(Latvia)	Artjoms Ļeščenko	R	2020	-

Defencemen
Number		Player	Shoots	Acquired	Place of Birth
47	(Latvia)	Renars Džerods Alksnis	L	2018	Aloja, Latvia
44	(Latvia)	Harijs Brants	L	2020	Valmiera, Latvia
33	(Latvia)	Aleksandrs Galkins (A)	R	2020	Daugavpils, Latvia
5	(Latvia)	Daniels Goršānovs	L	2018	-
89	(Latvia)	Iļja Grekovs	L	2020	Liepāja, Latvia
85	(Latvia)	Kristaps Jākobsons	L	2020	Riga, Latvia
83	(Latvia)	Roberts Kaļķis	L	2020	Riga, Latvia
55	(Latvia)	Patriks Ozols	L	2020	-
77	(Latvia)	Mārtiņš Porejs (A)	L	2020	Riga, Latvia
35	(Latvia)	Haralds Rauls Slišāns	L	2020	-

Forwards
Number		Player	Shoots	Position	Acquired	Place of Birth
22	(Latvia)	Vladislavs Adeļsons	L	F	2017	-
7	(Latvia)	Rustams Begovs (C)	L	C	2018	Olaine, Latvia
97	(Latvia)	Ričards Bernhards	R	RW	2017	Riga, Latvia
73	(Latvia)	Ričards Briņecs	R	F	2018	Jelgava, Latvia
0	(Latvia)	Verners Fricbergs	R	F	2020	Riga, Latvia
19	(Latvia)	Artūrs Homjakovs	L	W	2019	-
72	(Latvia)	Roberts Jekimovs	R	LW/RW	2020	Riga, Latvia
23	(Latvia)	Ralfs Jevdokimovs	L	F	2020	-
17	(Latvia)	Aleksandrs Novikovs	L	W	2018	Liepāja, Latvia
88	(Latvia)	Roberts Petrovičs	L	F	2020	-
14	(Latvia)	Frenks Razgals	L	LW/RW	2020	Riga, Latvia
13	(Latvia)	Kristaps Roķis	L	F	2020	Valmiera, Latvia
90	(Latvia)	Kirils Tambijevs	L	C/RW	2019	Riga, Latvia
71	(Latvia)	Deivids Tempelmanis	R	F	2020	-
16	(Latvia)	Deniss Vilmans	R	W	2020	Liepāja, Latvia
8	(Latvia)	Aleksandrs Visockis	L	LW	2019	Liepāja, Latvia

== Season-by-season record ==
Note: GP = Games played, W = Wins, L = Losses, T = Ties, OTL = Overtime losses, Pts = Points, GF = Goals for, GA = Goals against, PIM = Penalties in minutes

Season	League	GP	W	L	T	OTW	OTL	Pts	GF	GA	Finish	Playoffs
2015–16	Latvian Hockey Higher League	30	17	11	—	1	1	54	137	87	4th	Quarter-final loss
2016–17	Latvian Hockey Higher League	30	18	7	—	2	3	61	137	85	3rd	Semi-final loss
2017–18	Optibet Hockey League	30	12	13	—	4	1	45	87	94	4th	Final loss
2018–19	Optibet Hockey League	35	20	11	—	2	2	66	138	89	2nd	Semi-final loss
2019–20	Optibet Hockey League	35	15	14	—	2	4	38	138	105	5th	Playoffs cancelled

== Team records ==
=== Career ===
These are the top five scorers in HK Zemgale/LLU history.

Note: Pos = Position; GP = Games played; G = Goals; A = Assists; Pts = Points

Player	Pos	GP	G	A	Pts
Guntis Pujāts	F	91	100	98	198
Raivis Kurnigins	D	235	67	110	177
Artjoms Ogorodņikovs	F	156	53	87	140
Artūrs Batraks	F	179	47	84	131
Olafs Aploks	F	138	58	75	128

Penalty minutes: Krišs Kupčus, 211

=== Season ===
==== Regular season ====
- Most goals in a season: Guntis Pujāts, 31 (2011–12)
- Most assists in a season: Guntis Pujāts, 38 (2011–12)
- Most points in a season: Guntis Pujāts, 69 (2011–12)
- Most penalty minutes in a season: Gatis Gajevskis, 135 (2004–05)

==== Playoffs ====
- Most goals in a playoff season: Ivan Rybchik, 9 (2017–18)
- Most assists in a playoff season: Artūrs Āboliņš, 7 (2014–15)
- Most points in a playoff season: Māris Miezis, 11 (2014–15)
- Most penalty minutes in a playoff season: Olafs Aploks, 41 (2017–18)

== Notable players ==
- David Levin

== Notable coaches ==
- Haralds Vasiljevs
