= 2008–09 Latvian Hockey League season =

2008–09 Latvian Hockey League
- League: Latvian Hockey Higher League
- Sport: Ice hockey
- Number of teams: 12

Regular season
- Winners: HK Concept Riga

Playoffs

Finals
- Champions: HK Liepājas Metalurgs
- Runners-up: ASK/Ogre

Latvian Hockey League seasons
- ← 2007–08 2009–10 →

The 2008–09 Latvian Hockey League season was the 18th season of the Latvian Hockey League, the top level of ice hockey in Latvia. Eight teams participated in the league, and HK Liepājas Metalurgs won the championship.

== Regular season ==
	Club	GP	W	OTW	OTL	L	GF:GA	Pts
1.	(Latvia) HK Concept Riga	28	21	0	1	6	149:68	64
2.	(Latvia) HK Ozolnieki/Monarhs	28	18	2	1	7	111:76	59
3.	(Latvia) HK Liepājas Metalurgs II	28	15	3	2	8	108:77	53
4.	(Lithuania) SC Energija	28	17	1	0	10	158:89	53
5.	(Latvia) SK LSPA Riga	28	13	4	3	8	113:82	50
6.	(Latvia) HS Riga/Prizma-Hanza	28	7	0	4	17	77:135	25
7.	(Latvia) SK Riga 18	28	4	2	1	21	59:137	17
8.	(Latvia) DHK Latgale II	28	4	1	1	22	64:175	15

== Playoffs ==
Quarterfinals (Best of Three)
B8	(Latvia) HK Liepājas Metalurgs	2
LV4	(Lithuania) SC Energija	0
B13	(Latvia) DHK Latgale	2
LV1	(Latvia) HK Concept Riga	0
B11	(Latvia) HK Riga 2000	2
LV3	(Latvia) HK Liepājas Metalurgs II	0
B12	(Latvia) ASK/Ogre	2
LV2	(Latvia) HK Ozolnieki/Monarhs	0

Semifinals (Best of Five)
B8	(Latvia) HK Liepājas Metalurgs	3
B13	(Latvia) DHK Latgale	2
B11	(Latvia) HK Riga 2000	1
B12	(Latvia) ASK/Ogre	3

Final (Best of Seven)
B8	(Latvia) HK Liepājas Metalurgs	4
B12	(Latvia) ASK/Ogre	2
Third place
B11	(Latvia) HK Riga 2000	2
B13	(Latvia) DHK Latgale	0
