= 2004–05 Latvian Hockey League season =

2004–05 Latvian Hockey League
- League: Latvian Hockey Higher League
- Sport: Ice hockey
- Number of teams: 8

Regular season
- Winners: HK Vilki OP Riga

Playoffs

Finals
- Champions: HK Riga 2000
- Runners-up: ASK/Ogre

Latvian Hockey League seasons
- ← 2003–04 2005–06 →

The 2004–05 Latvian Hockey League season was the 14th season of the Latvian Hockey League, the top level of ice hockey in Latvia. Eight teams participated in the league, and HK Riga 2000 won the championship.

== Regular season ==
	Club	GP	W	OTW	OTL	L	GF:GA	Pts
1.	(Latvia) HK Vilki OP Riga	28	20	1	3	4	133:80	45
2.	(Latvia) HK Liepājas Metalurgs	28	16	3	0	9	164:93	38
3.	(Latvia) ASK/Ogre	28	15	3	0	10	171:103	36
4.	(Latvia) SK Riga 20	28	13	2	3	10	132:110	33
5.	(Latvia) HK Riga 2000	28	13	0	2	13	119:108	28
6.	(Lithuania) SC Energija	28	12	0	1	15	161:156	25
7.	(Latvia) HK Zemgale	28	8	1	1	18	81:178	19
8.	(Latvia) SK Riga 18	28	5	0	0	23	86:218	10

== Playoffs ==
- ASK/Ogre - SC Energija 3–0 on series
- HK Vilki Riga - SK Riga 18 3–0 on series
- HK Riga 2000 - SK Riga 20 3–0 on series
- HK Liepajas Metalurgs - HK Zemgale 3–0 on series

Semifinals

- ASK/Ogre - HK Vilki Riga 3–2 on series
- HK Riga 2000 - HK Liepajas Metalurgs 3–1 on series

Final

- HK Riga 2000 - ASK/Ogre 4–0 on series

3rd place

- HK Liepajas Metalurgs - HK Vilki Riga 2–0 on series
