= HK Ozolnieki/Monarhs =

Latvian ice hockey club

HK Ozolnieki/Monarch
- City: Ozolnieki, Latvia
- League: Optibet Hockey League
- Founded: 2000
- Folded: 2014
- Home arena: Ozo ledus halle
- Colours: Black, white, yellow
- Head coach: (Latvia) Eduards Ivanovs

Franchise history
- 1994-2000: Nik's/Brih
- 2000-2006: Vilki/OP
- 2006-2008: Vilki/Monarch
- 2008-2014: Ozolnieki/Monarch

HK Ozolnieki/Monarch (also HK Ozolnieki/Monarhs) was a Latvian ice hockey club from Ozolnieki, founded in 2008. Formally the club was established as HK Vilki in 2000, but the roots of the team date back to a team called AK-2, founded in Riga in 1987. The owner of the club during its stay in Ozolnieki was 7-time NHL All-star defenseman Sandis Ozoliņš.

The team folded before the start of the 2014–15 Latvian Hockey League season.

== Previous names ==
- 1987: AK-2
- 1990s: Saurieši
- 1994–2000: Nik's/Brih
- 2000–2006: Vilki/OP
- 2006–2008: Vilki/Monarch
