= DHK Latgale =

Defunct Latvian ice hockey team

- City: Daugavpils, Latvia
- League: Latvian Hockey Higher League; Belarusian Extraleague
- Founded: 2003; 23 years ago
- Folded: 2012; 14 years ago
- Home arena: Daugavpils Ice Arena
- Colors: White, blue, yellow
- Owner: Leonards Tenis
- General manager: Arvīds Sauss
- Head coach: Jurijs Agureikins
- Website: www.hockeylatgale.lv

DHK Latgale was a Latvian hockey league team based in Daugavpils, Latvia from 2003 to 2012. The team played in the Latvian Hockey Higher League and in the Belarusian Extraleague for the 2008-09 season.

== Notable players ==
- (Czech Republic) Robert Machalek (Defender)
- (Latvia) Andrejs Lavrenovs (Defender)
- (Russia) Mikhail Shibanov (Goalie)
- (Slovakia) Lukáš Pék (Forward)
- (Lithuania) Donatas Kumeliauskas (Forward)
