= HK Riga 2000 =

Defunct Latvian ice hockey club

HK Rīga 2000
- City: Riga, Latvia
- League: BXL 2004-06, 2008-09 LHL 2000-08 EEHL 2000-04
- Founded: 2000
- Folded: 2009
- Home arena: Inbox.lv ledus halle (capacity: 1,500)
- Colors
- Owner: (Latvia) Viesturs Koziols
- General manager: (Latvia) Dainis Arins
- Head coach: (Latvia) Haralds Vasiļjevs
- Affiliates: Dinamo Riga (KHL)

HK Riga 2000 was an ice hockey team based in Riga, Latvia. The team had played in the Latvian Hockey League since it was founded in 2000. In 2004-05 and 2005–06 seasons the club also iced a team in the Belarusian Hockey League, and in 2005-06 finished 3rd.

HK Riga 2000 was first foreign team to finish in top three of Belarusian Open Championship. The club has also played several years in the Continental Cup, winning silver in 2005-06 and 2007–08.

Before the 2009-2010 KHL season the team was merged into HK Dinamo/Juniors Rīga, the farm club of KHL side Dinamo Rīga.

== Notable players ==
=== Noteworthy Players ===
- Artūrs Irbe
- Kārlis Skrastiņš
- Sergei Zholtok
- Darby Hendrickson

=== Retired numbers ===
The Rīga 2000 have retired one number.

Rīga 2000 retired numbers
No.	Player
33	Sergejs Žoltoks

=== Awards and trophies ===
Latvian Hockey Higher League

- 2000–01, 2003–04, 2004–05, 2005–06
