= HK Riga =

Defunct Latvian ice hockey club

HK Rīga
- City: Riga
- League: MHL
- Conference: Western
- Founded: 2009
- Home arena: Inbox.lv ledus halle
- Colours: Grey, white, black
- Parent club: Dinamo Riga (KHL)
- Website: www.hkr.lv

Franchise history
- 2010–present: HK Rīga
- 2009–2010: HK Dinamo/Juniors

HK Rīga was an ice hockey club, based in Riga, Latvia. It was founded as HK Dinamo/Juniors in 2009, and since 2014 served as the main farm club of former Kontinental Hockey League club Dinamo Riga.

The club played the 2009–10 season in both the Latvian Hockey Higher League (which they won) and the Belarusian Extraleague, but joined the Russian Junior Hockey League (MHL), the junior league of the Kontinental Hockey League, for the 2010–11 season.

After the full-scale Russian invasion of Ukraine and the departure of Dinamo from the KHL, the team played its last season in the MHL and was later dissolved around 2022.
