= ASK/Ogre =

Defunct Latvian hockey team

ASK Ogre
- City: Ogre, Latvia
- League: Latvian Hockey Higher League; Belarusian Extraliga
- Founded: 2003
- Folded: 2009
- Home arena: Vidzemes Ledus Halle

ASK/Ogre ('Armijas sporta klubs/Ogre') was an ice hockey club in Ogre, Latvia founded in 2003. Their home arena was Vidzemes Ledus Halle.

The team finished second in the Latvian championship in the 2003/04, 2004/05, 2006/07 and 2007/08 seasons. In 2008/09 they played in the Belarusian Extraliga, finishing the season with just 10 wins in 52 games. They ceased operations at the conclusion of the season.

== Notable players ==
(Latvia)

- Edgars Adamovičs
- Jānis Brakšs
- Andrejs Ignatovičs
- Aleksandrs Kerčs Sr.
- Vladislavs Vodolažskis
