= HK Liepājas Metalurgs =

Latvian ice hockey club

Liepājas Metalurgs
- City: Liepāja
- League: BXL 2004-2013; LHL 1997-2013; MHL B 2012-2013
- Founded: 1997
- Folded: 2013
- Home arena: Olimpiskā ledus halle (capacity: 1,200)
- Colours
- Website: http://www.skliepajasmetalurgs.lv/

Franchise history
- HK Liepājas Metalurgs

HK Liepājas Metalurgs was a professional hockey club based in Liepāja, Latvia that fielded multiple teams over the years competing in the Belarusian Extraliga (BXL), Latvian Hockey League (LHL), and Minor Hockey League Division B (MHL B). The club was dissolved following the conclusion of the 2012-13 season when primary sponsor, industrial company Liepājas Metalurgs, discontinued support for the club.

Beginning with the 2014-15 LHL season, a new club in Liepāja has been formed and currently simply goes by the name Liepāja.

== History ==
The club was founded in 1997. In 1998 their current home arena - Olimpiskā ledus halle was built. Season set out to create a professional hockey team, which would serve as an example and should aim to be pursued for young hockey players.

As of now, Liepājas Metalurgs has won six (1998/99, 1999/00, 2001/02, 2002/03, 2007/2008, 2008/2009) Latvian champion titles, twice losing in the league finals (2000/01, 2005/06) and has claimed the third spot another three times (2003/04, 2004/05, 2006/07). Six times the team played the Eastern European Hockey League, which Metalurgs managed to win in 2002.

Latvian Ice Hockey Federation president Kirovs Lipmans served as president of HK Liepājas Metalurgs from 1996 to 2003.

In 2010 club became an affiliate of Dinamo Riga, allowing the KHL club to send up to five players to Liepāja.

=== Retired numbers ===
- 21 Eduards Ivanovs

== Awards ==
- Latvian hockey league champions - 2000, 2002, 2003, 2010, 2011, 2016 and maybe 2017. EDIT: Ragnars Spicins
- Eastern European Hockey League champions - 2002.
