= Latvian Hockey Higher League =

Latvian sports league

Optibet Hockey League
- Current season, competition or edition: 2026–27 Latvian Hockey League season
- Sport: Ice hockey
- Founded: 1931
- No. of teams: 9
- Countries: Estonia, Latvia, Lithuania, Ukraine
- Most recent champion: HK Mogo (5th title) (2025–26)
- Most titles: HK Liepājas Metalurgs (7 titles)
- Relegation to: 1. līga (Latvian Hockey First League)
- Website: www.lhf.lv/lv/turniri/optibet-hokeja-liga

The Latvian Hockey Higher League (Latvian: Latvijas Virslīgas hokeja čempionāts), also known as the Optibet Hockey League (Latvian: Optibet hokeja līga) since 2017 due to sponsorship by Optibet, is the top tier league of ice hockey in Latvia. The league is competed by nine teams from Latvia, Lithuania, Estonia and Ukraine.

Previously it was also known as the Latvian Open Hockey Championships (Latvijas atklātais čempionāts hokejā) and the Samsung Premier League (Samsung Premjerlīga) from 2006 to 2008. The league was established in 1931.

HK Liepājas Metalurgs, which played in the league between 1999 and 2013, has been the most successful team of the tournament, having won seven titles.

A number of players who played in the National Hockey League (NHL) have played in the league, including Latvians Rodrigo Ābols, Kaspars Astašenko, Uvis Balinskis, Helmuts Balderis, Oskars Bārtulis, Kaspars Daugaviņš, Kristers Gudļevskis, Viktors Ignatjevs, Artūrs Irbe, Raitis Ivanāns, Mārtiņš Karsums, Ronalds Ķēniņš, Aleksandrs Kerčs, Matīss Kivlenieks, Artūrs Kulda, Kārlis Skrastiņš, Pēteris Skudra, Jānis Sprukts, Artūrs Šilovs, as well as imports Darby Hendrickson, Konstantin Pushkaryov, Rob Schremp.

== Teams ==
=== Teams in 2026–27 ===
Team	City	Arena	Capacity	Affiliate(s)	Founded	Joined
Energija	(Lithuania) Elektrėnai	Elektrėnai Ice Palace	2,000		1977	2022
Hockey Punks – Mototoja	Vilnius	Pramogų Arena	2,500		2010	2022
Kyiv Capitals	(Ukraine) Kyiv	Inbox.lv Ice Hall	1,000		2023	2025
Liepājas HK	(Latvia) Liepāja	LOC Ice Hall	2,283		2017	2025
Mogo/RSU	Riga	Mogo Ice Hall	600	HK Mārupe (JAHL)	2014	
Panter	(Estonia) Tallinn	Škoda Ice Hall	500		2001	2023
Prizma/RTU	Riga	Volvo Sports Centre	1,000	HK Prizma Riga-2 (JAHL)	1996	
Rīgas HS/Dinaburga	Riga; Daugavpils	Riga Hockey Hall; Daugavpils Ice Arena	300; 2,734	HS Riga 17 (JAHL)	2026	
Zemgale/LBTU	Jelgava	Jelgava Ice Hall	1,300	HK Zemgale Juniors (JAHL)	2001	

=== Former teams ===
Team	City	Joined	Left	League titles
ASK Rīga	Riga	1931	1940	5
LSB Rīga	Riga	1931	1940	0
RFK Rīga	Riga	1931	1936	0
Unions Rīga	Riga	1931	1939	2
US Rīga	Riga	1931	1942	3
Dinamo Rīga (original)	Riga	1940	1941	1
Sāga Ķekava	Ķekava	1991	1996	1
Pārdaugava Rīga	Riga	1991	1995	2
Essamika Ogre	Ogre	1992	2000	1
Juniors Rīga	Riga	1992	2000	0
Nik's Brih Rīga	Riga	1992	2000	3
Alianse Rīga	Riga	1994	1996	1
Lido/Nafta Rīga	Riga	1994	2001	0
HK Liepājas Metalurgs	Liepāja	1999	2013	7
HK Rīga 2000	Riga	2000	2009	5
Vilki/OP Rīga	Riga	2000	2006	0
ASK/Ogre	Ogre	2003	2011	0
DHK Latgale	Daugavpils	2005	2012	0
HK Ozolnieki/Monarhs	Ozolnieki	2008	2014	0
Dinamo Juniors Rīga	Riga	2010	2014	1
HK SMScredit.lv	Riga	2012	2013	1
HK Dinaburga	Daugavpils	2013; 2019	2014; 2023	0
Kurbads	Riga	2013; 2023	2020; 2024	2
HK Liepāja	Liepāja	2014	2022	1
HS Rīga	Riga	2015	2026	0
HK Lido	Riga	2017	2019	0
HK Olimp/Venta 2002	Riga	2019	2022	1
Dinamo Riga	Riga	2022	2023	0
Kaunas City	Kaunas	2022	2024	0

== League champions ==
- 1931–32 – Unions Rīga
- 1932–33 – Unions Rīga
- 1933–34 – ASK Rīga
- 1934–35 – ASK Rīga
- 1935–36 – ASK Rīga
- 1936–37 – US Rīga
- 1937–38 – ASK Rīga
- 1938–39 – ASK Rīga
- 1939–40 – US Rīga
- 1940–41 – Dinamo Rīga
- 1941–42 – US Rīga
- 1942–43 – not finished due to World War II
- 1943–1991 – not played during the Soviet occupation of Latvia, substituted with other Soviet tournaments
- 1991–92 – HK Sāga Ķekava Riga
- 1992–93 – HK Pārdaugava Rīga
- 1993–94 – HK Pārdaugava Rīga
- 1994–95 – HK Nik's Brih Riga
- 1995–96 – Alianse Riga
- 1996–97 – LB/Essamika
- 1997–98 – HK Nik's Brih Riga
- 1998–99 – HK Nik's Brih Riga
- 1999–2000 – Liepājas Metalurgs
- 2000–01 – HK Riga 2000
- 2001–02 – Liepājas Metalurgs
- 2002–03 – Liepājas Metalurgs
- 2003–04 – HK Riga 2000
- 2004–05 – HK Riga 2000
- 2005–06 – HK Riga 2000
- 2006–07 – HK Riga 2000
- 2007–08 – Liepājas Metalurgs
- 2008–09 – Liepājas Metalurgs
- 2009–10 – Dinamo-Juniors Riga
- 2010–11 – Liepājas Metalurgs
- 2011–12 – Liepājas Metalurgs
- 2012–13 – HK SMScredit.lv
- 2013–14 – HS Rīga/Prizma
- 2014–15 – HK Mogo
- 2015–16 – HK Liepāja
- 2016–17 – HK Kurbads
- 2017–18 – HK Kurbads
- 2018–19 – HK Mogo
- 2019–20 – not finished
- 2020–21 – HK Olimp/Venta 2002
- 2021–22 – HK Zemgale/LLU
- 2022–23 – HK Zemgale/LLU
- 2023–24 – HK Mogo
- 2024–25 – HK Mogo
- 2025–26 – HK Mogo

== Titles by team ==
Titles	Club	Years
7	Liepājas Metalurgs	2000, 2002, 2003, 2008, 2009, 2011, 2012
5	ASK Rīga	1934, 1935, 1936, 1938, 1939
5	HK Riga 2000	2001, 2004, 2005, 2006, 2007
5	HK Mogo	2015, 2019, 2024, 2025, 2026
3	US Rīga	1937, 1940, 1942
3	HK Nik's Brih Riga	1995, 1998, 1999
2	Unions Rīga	1932, 1933
2	HK Pardaugava Riga	1993, 1994
2	HK Kurbads	2017, 2018
2	HK Zemgale/LLU	2022, 2023
1	Dinamo Riga	1941
1	HK Sāga Ķekava Riga	1992
1	Alianse Riga	1996
1	LB/Essamika	1997
1	Dinamo-Juniors Riga	2010
1	SMScredit.lv Riga	2013
1	HS Rīga/Prizma	2014
1	HK Liepāja	2016
1	HK Olimp/Venta 2002	2021
