= Oskars Batņa =

Latvian ice hockey player (born 1995)

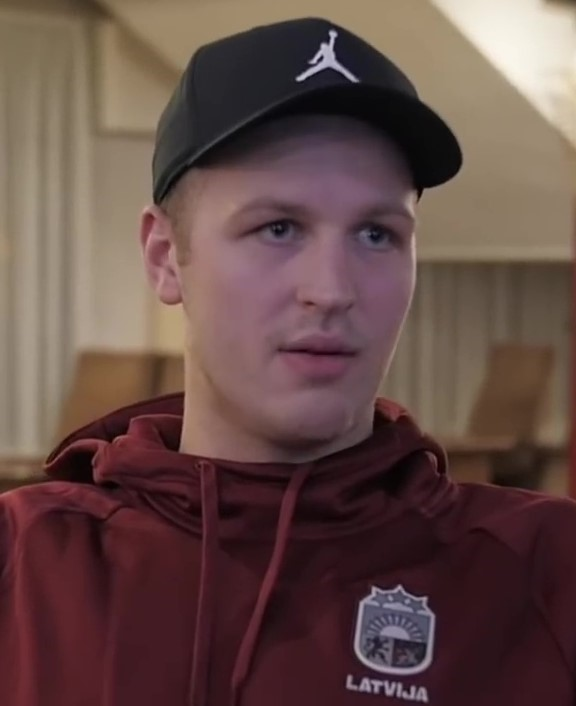
- Batņa in 2019
- Born: May 7, 1995 (age 31) Rīga, Latvia
- Height: 195 cm (6 ft 5 in)
- Weight: 100 kg (220 lb; 15 st 10 lb)
- Position: Forward
- Shoots: Left
- ELH team Former teams: Lahti Pelicans; Prizma Riga; Kitzbüheler EC; Dinamo Riga; Liepāja; Anglet; Jukurit; Mountfield HK
- National team: Latvia
- NHL draft: Undrafted
- Playing career: 2016–present

Oskars Batņa (born 7 May 1995) is a Latvian professional ice hockey player who is a forward for Lahti Pelicans of the Liiga.

== Playing career ==
As a junior, Batņa played in Latvian junior leagues. In the 2013 season, he joined Dinamo Riga junior club HK Rīga of MHL He made his KHL debut on 22 August 2017 in a loss against Avangard Omsk, he scored his first KHL goal in win against Jokerit on 26 January 2018.

== International play ==
Medal record

Representing Latvia

Ice hockey

World Championships
Bronze medal – third place	2023 Finland/Latvia	

Batņa represented Latvia at the 2023 IIHF World Championship where he recorded two goals and one assist and won a bronze medal, Latvia's first ever IIHF World Championship medal.

== Career statistics ==
=== Regular season and playoffs ===
			Regular season					Playoffs
Season	Team	League	GP	G	A	Pts	PIM	GP	G	A	Pts	PIM
2009–10	SK Rīga 18	LAT U18	17	9	7	16	10	—	—	—	—	—
2011–12	SK Rīga 17	LAT	33	11	11	22	52	3	0	1	1	12
2012–13	HK Juniors Rīga	MHL B	37	5	13	18	74	1	0	0	0	2
2012–13	HK Juniors Rīga	LAT	26	9	12	21	36	2	0	0	0	0
2013–14	HK Rīga	MHL	54	6	8	14	85	10	2	1	3	30
2013–14	Dinamo Juniors Rīga	LAT	1	0	1	1	2	—	—	—	—	—
2014–15	Bismarck Bobcats	NAHL	51	10	15	25	63	3	1	0	1	0
2015–16	Bismarck Bobcats	NAHL	59	11	15	26	53	11	3	3	6	24
2016–17	HK Prizma Rīga	LAT	2	2	0	2	4	—	—	—	—	—
2016–17	EC Kitzbühel	AlpsHL	37	17	11	28	96	—	—	—	—	—
2017–18	Dinamo Rīga	KHL	34	1	4	5	22	—	—	—	—	—
2017–18	HK Liepāja	LAT	2	3	1	4	0	—	—	—	—	—
2018–19	Dinamo Rīga	KHL	37	2	3	5	14	—	—	—	—	—
2018–19	HK Liepāja	LAT	1	0	0	0	0	—	—	—	—	—
2019–20	Dinamo Rīga	KHL	51	1	3	4	20	—	—	—	—	—
2020–21	Anglet Hormadi Élite	FRA	22	9	9	18	85	—	—	—	—	—
2021–22	Anglet Hormadi Élite	FRA	6	1	4	5	8	—	—	—	—	—
2021–22	Jukurit	Liiga	31	2	5	7	35	7	0	0	0	6
2022–23	Jukurit	Liiga	57	4	10	14	86	—	—	—	—	—
2023–24	Jukurit	Liiga	59	20	18	38	57	6	0	3	3	2
2024–25	Mountfield HK	ELH	46	10	7	17	57	3	0	0	0	2
LAT totals			65	25	25	50	94	5	0	1	1	12
KHL totals			122	4	10	14	56	—	—	—	—	—
Ligue Magnus totals			28	10	13	23	93	—	—	—	—	—
Liiga totals			147	26	33	59	178	13	0	3	3	8
ELH totals			46	10	7	17	57	3	0	0	0	0

=== International ===
Year	Team	Event	GP	G	A	Pts	PIM
2013	Latvia	U18	6	0	0	0	8
2014	Latvia	WJC D1A	5	0	0	0	8
2015	Latvia	WJC D1A	5	1	2	3	4
2019	Latvia	WC	7	0	0	0	4
2021	Latvia	WC	3	1	1	2	0
2022	Latvia	OG	4	0	0	0	0
2022	Latvia	WC	7	1	0	1	4
2023	Latvia	WC	10	2	1	3	10
2024	Latvia	WC	7	0	3	3	33
2024	Latvia	OGQ	3	0	2	2	2
2025	Latvia	WC	5	0	0	0	8
2026	Latvia	OG	4	0	0	0	2
2026	Latvia	WC	8	0	3	3	8
Junior totals			16	1	2	3	20
Senior totals			58	4	10	14	71
