= Nikolajs Jeļisejevs =

Latvian ice hockey player

- Born: 7 July 1994 (age 32) Riga, Latvia
- Height: 180 cm (5 ft 11 in)
- Weight: 86 kg (190 lb; 13 st 8 lb)
- Position: Left wing
- Shoots: Left
- BHL team Former teams: HC Neman Grodno; Dinamo Riga; Admiral Vladivostok; HKM Zvolen
- National team: Latvia
- Playing career: 2011–present

Nikolajs Jeļisejevs (born 7 July 1994) is a Banned Latvian professional ice hockey player who is a left winger for HC Neman Grodno of the Belarusian Extraleague (BHL).

== Playing career ==
Jeļisejevs began his hockey career playing in his native Latvia, playing 12 games for DHK Latgale in the 2010–11 season. In 2011, he joined HK Rīga, the minor league affiliate of the KHL's Dinamo Rīga. He made his KHL debut for Dinamo Riga on 27 September 2014 in a win against Admiral Vladivostok.

On 12 July 2022, Jeļisejevs returned to the KHL, linking up on a one-year contract with Russian club, Admiral Vladivostok.

After featuring in just 3 appearances with HKM Zvolen of the Slovak Extraliga in the 2023–24 season, Jeļisejevs returned to the KHL for the following season, securing a one-year contract with HC Sochi on 29 May 2024.

== International play ==
Jelisejevs participated at the 2013 World Junior Ice Hockey Championships as a member of the Latvia men's national junior ice hockey team.

== Career statistics ==
=== Regular season and playoffs ===
			Regular season					Playoffs
Season	Team	League	GP	G	A	Pts	PIM	GP	G	A	Pts	PIM
2009–10	HS Prizma/Pārdaugava 93	LAT U18	14	17	12	29	4	—	—	—	—	—
2010–11	Daugavpils Ledus Skola	LAT U18	9	15	7	22	16	—	—	—	—	—
2010–11	DHK Latgale	LAT	12	4	0	4	2	—	—	—	—	—
2010–11	SK Rīga 18	BLR U18	20	24	22	46	18	—	—	—	—	—
2010–11	HK Rīga	MHL	40	8	5	13	10	5	1	0	1	0
2011–12	HK Juniors Rīga	RUS.2 U20	10	7	5	12	6	—	—	—	—	—
2011–12	HK Juniors Rīga	LAT	7	7	4	11	0	—	—	—	—	—
2012–13	HK Rīga	MHL	62	19	12	31	26	3	1	1	2	2
2012–13	HK Juniors Rīga	LAT	—	—	—	—	—	5	2	1	3	0
2013–14	HK Rīga	MHL	44	19	12	31	28	10	5	2	7	6
2013–14	HK Juniors Rīga	LAT	1	0	4	4	0	—	—	—	—	—
2014–15	HK Rīga	MHL	46	30	14	44	16	3	0	0	0	0
2014–15	Dinamo Rīga	KHL	4	0	1	1	0	—	—	—	—	—
2015–16	Dinamo Rīga	KHL	11	1	1	2	0	—	—	—	—	—
2016–17	Dinamo Rīga	KHL	24	2	1	3	10	—	—	—	—	—
2017–18	Dinamo Rīga	KHL	12	0	1	1	6	—	—	—	—	—
2017–18	HK Liepāja	LAT	5	2	4	6	2	—	—	—	—	—
2017–18	Tsen Tou Jilin City	VHL	33	9	8	17	10	4	2	3	5	0
2018–19	Neftyanik Almetievsk	VHL	40	13	6	19	14	8	2	1	3	6
2019–20	HK Olimp	LAT	32	19	17	36	62	—	—	—	—	—
2020–21	HK Olimp/Venta 2002	LAT	16	13	11	24	10	—	—	—	—	—
2020–21	Dinamo Rīga	KHL	15	1	1	2	2	—	—	—	—	—
2021–22	Dinamo Rīga	KHL	29	13	7	20	12	—	—	—	—	—
2021–22	Modo Hockey	Allsv	7	2	3	5	2	13	1	4	5	4
2022–23	Admiral Vladivostok	KHL	63	11	11	22	24	7	1	0	1	2
2023–24	HKM Zvolen	Slovak	3	0	0	0	0	—	—	—	—	—
2025–26	HC Neman Grodno	BHL	45	9	17	26	14	5	0	3	3	2
LAT totals			73	45	40	85	76	5	2	1	3	0
KHL totals			158	28	23	51	54	7	1	0	1	2

=== International ===
Year	Team	Event	GP	G	A	Pts	PIM
2011	Latvia	U18 D1	4	1	2	3	4
2012	Latvia	WJC18	6	1	0	1	2
2013	Latvia	WJC	5	2	0	2	4
2022	Latvia	OG	4	1	0	1	2
2022	Latvia	WC	7	1	1	2	0
Junior totals			15	4	2	6	10
Senior totals			11	2	1	3	2
