= Aleksandrs Macijevskis =

Latvian ice hockey player

- Born: June 26, 1975 (age 51) Riga, Latvian SSR, Soviet Union
- Height: 5 ft 10 in (178 cm)
- Weight: 181 lb (82 kg; 12 st 13 lb)
- Position: Right wing
- Shot: Left
- LHL team Former teams: HK Kurbads; Pārdaugava Rīga; Hermes; SaiPa; Aalborg; Odense Bulldogs; SønderjyskE Ishockey; Metallurg Zhlobin; Björklöven; Stjernen Hockey; Prizma Riga
- National team: Latvia
- Playing career: 1992–2018

Aleksandrs Macijevskis (born June 26, 1975) is a Latvian professional ice hockey player, currently playing for HK Kurbads of the Latvian Hockey League (LHL).

== Playing career ==
Macijevskis began his career in Dinamo Riga, however he only played for Dinamo successor Pārdaugava Rīga, where he played for three seasons through 1992–93 to 1994–95.

He spent most of his career in Denmark where he played for several clubs, most notably for Odense Bulldogs. During his career he has played in Finland, Belarus, Norway and Sweden.

=== International ===
Macijevskis played for team Latvia in World Championships and in 2002 Winter Olympics. From 1996 till 2005 he was regular on team Latvia roster.

== Career statistics ==
=== Regular season and playoffs ===
			Regular season					Playoffs
Season	Team	League	GP	G	A	Pts	PIM	GP	G	A	Pts	PIM
1991–92	Pārdaugava–2 Rīga	LAT	18	16	13	29	8	—	—	—	—	—
1992–93	Pārdaugava Rīga	LAT	21	24	22	46	18	—	—	—	—	—
1993–94	Pārdaugava Rīga	IHL	4	1	0	1	0	—	—	—	—	—
1993–94	Hokeja Centrs Rīga	LAT	22	25	16	41	6	3	1	0	1	0
1994–95	Pārdaugava Rīga	IHL	32	2	4	6	12	—	—	—	—	—
1995–96	Juniors Rīga	EEHL	37	25	29	64	12	—	—	—	—	—
1995–96	Juniors Rīga	LAT		27	29	56		—	—	—	—	—
1996–97	Hermes	FIN.2	43	37	30	67	26	3	0	0	0	4
1997–98	SaiPa	SM-l	43	9	15	24	14	3	0	0	0	0
1998–99	SaiPa	SM-l	54	3	6	9	30	—	—	—	—	—
1999–2000	AaB Ishockey	DEN	42	32	28	60	14	—	—	—	—	—
2000–01	Odense Bulldogs	DEN	26	11	12	23	29	—	—	—	—	—
2001–02	Odense Bulldogs	DEN	43	36	32	68	24	13	15	7	22
2002–03	Odense Bulldogs	DEN	26	12	11	23	0	12	6	4	10	4
2003–04	Odense Bulldogs	DEN	36	19	23	42	14	—	—	—	—	—
2004–05	Odense Bulldogs	DEN	34	17	14	31	10	15	5	8	13	6
2005–06	Odense Bulldogs	DEN	36	18	26	44	6	5	4	4	8	6
2005–06	HK Rīga 2000	BLR	—	—	—	—	—	3	0	0	0	0
2006–07	Odense Bulldogs	DEN	36	16	21	37	16	6	1	1	2	0
2007–08	AaB Ishockey	DEN	45	26	32	58	20	5	4	1	5	2
2008–09	SønderjyskE Ishockey	DEN	44	20	27	47	16	16	6	10	16	4
2009–10	SønderjyskE Ishockey	DEN	29	16	17	33	12	13	9	9	18	2
2010–11	Metallurg Zhlobin	BLR	5	0	1	1	4	—	—	—	—	—
2010–11	SønderjyskE Ishockey	DEN	3	1	1	2	0	—	—	—	—	—
2010–11	IF Björklöven	SWE.3	14	3	9	12	0	5	0	2	2	2
2011–12	Stjernen Hockey	NOR	40	15	23	38	12	4	0	3	3	0
2012–13	Stjernen Hockey	NOR	44	20	30	50	18	4	0	4	4	2
2013–14	HK Prizma Rīga	LAT	17	17	12	29	0	12	5	6	11	4
2014–15	HK Kurbads	LAT	29	23	33	56	2	13	4	11	15	8
2015–16	HK Kurbads	LAT	28	13	34	47	14	14	5	14	19	2
2016–17	HK Kurbads	LAT	26	12	19	31	6	12	4	7	11	4
LAT totals			161	130	149	279	54	54	19	38	57	18
DEN totals			400	224	244	468	161	85	50	44	94	24

- LAT totals do not include stats from the 1995–96 season.

=== International ===
Year	Team	Event	GP	G	A	Pts	PIM
1993	Latvia	EJC C Q	2	2	1	3	0
1993	Latvia	EJC C	4	2	1	3	0
1994	Latvia	WJC C	4	2	5	7	0
1995	Latvia	WJC C1	4	6	5	11	2
1996	Latvia	WC B	7	2	2	4	2
1997	Latvia	WC	8	1	0	1	0
1999	Latvia	WC Q	3	0	0	0	0
2001	Latvia	WC	6	0	0	0	0
2002	Latvia	OG	4	2	3	5	0
2002	Latvia	WC	6	0	1	1	0
2003	Latvia	WC	6	0	0	0	0
2004	Latvia	WC	7	1	1	2	2
2005	Latvia	OGQ	3	0	0	0	2
2005	Latvia	WC	5	0	1	1	0
2007	Latvia	WC	6	0	1	1	10
2008	Latvia	WC	3	0	0	0	0
Junior totals			14	12	12	24	2
Senior totals			64	6	9	15	16
