= Oļegs Sorokins =

Latvian ice hockey player

- Born: January 4, 1974 (age 51) Riga, Soviet Union
- Height: 5 ft 10 in (178 cm)
- Weight: 187 lb (85 kg; 13 st 5 lb)
- Position: Defence
- Caught: Left
- Played for: HK Pardaugava Riga; Hokeja Centrs Riga; Juniors Riga; Quad City Mallards; Jacksonville Lizard Kings; Utica Blizzard; Roanoke Express; Kokkolan Hermes; Vaasan Sport; HC Slovan Bratislava; Molot-Prikamie Perm; HK Riga 2000; Ässät Pori; EHC Black Wings Linz; Södertälje SK; Metallurg Novokuznezk; HC Fribourg-Gottéron; Frederikshavn IK; Dinamo Riga; HK Ozolnieki/Monarhs
- National team: Latvia
- Playing career: 1991–present

Olegs Sorokins (born 4 January 1974 in Riga, Soviet Union) is a retired Latvian professional ice hockey defender. He played in HK Ozolnieki/Monarhs team in Latvian Hockey League in 2008, before joining Dinamo Riga of KHL for two seasons.

== Career statistics ==
=== Regular season and playoffs ===
			Regular season					Playoffs
Season	Team	League	GP	G	A	Pts	PIM	GP	G	A	Pts	PIM
1991–92	Pārdaugava–2 Rīga	LAT	6	3	7	10	4	—	—	—	—	—
1992–93	Pārdaugava Rīga	LAT	18	11	13	24	6	—	—	—	—	—
1993–94	Pārdaugava Rīga	IHL	4	0	0	0	2	—	—	—	—	—
1993–94	Hokeja Centrs	LAT	21	9	13	22	20	3	0	1	1	4
1994–95	Pārdaugava Rīga	IHL	37	1	4	5	8	—	—	—	—	—
1995–96	Juniors Rīga	LAT	—	5	26	31	—	—	—	—	—	—
1996–97	Quad City Mallards	CoHL	39	2	18	20	10	—	—	—	—	—
1996–97	Jacksonville Lizard Kings	ECHL	2	0	0	0	2	—	—	—	—	—
1996–97	Utica Blizzard	CoHL	8	0	6	6	2	—	—	—	—	—
1996–97	Roanoke Express	ECHL	3	0	1	1	0	—	—	—	—	—
1997–98	Juniors Essamika Rīga	EEHL	20	5	11	16	16	—	—	—	—	—
1997–98	Hermes	FIN.2	18	1	9	10	12	8	2	2	4	4
1998–99	Hermes	FIN.2	13	1	2	3	12	—	—	—	—	—
1998–99	Sport	FIN.2	35	9	13	22	34	7	2	0	2	8
1999–2000	Sport	FIN.2	43	7	17	24	69	4	2	3	5	0
2000–01	HC Slovan Bratislava	SVK	54	5	18	23	30	8	1	1	2	4
2001–02	Molot–Prikamye Perm	RSL	45	0	5	5	40	—	—	—	—	—
2002–03	HK Rīga 2000	EEHL	14	7	7	14	2	—	—	—	—	—
2002–03	HK Rīga 2000	LAT	—	2	3	5	6	—	—	—	—	—
2002–03	Ässät	SM-l	34	5	7	12	20	—	—	—	—	—
2003–04	Ässät	SM-l	37	6	11	17	24	—	—	—	—	—
2004–05	Ässät	SM-l	55	3	15	18	48	2	0	0	0	0
2005–06	HK Rīga 2000	BLR	15	1	3	4	12	—	—	—	—	—
2005–06	EHC Linz	AUT	29	3	6	9	18	—	—	—	—	—
2006–07	EHC Linz	AUT	9	1	2	3	8	—	—	—	—	—
2006–07	Södertälje SK	Allsv	30	3	14	17	26	10	1	6	7	14
2007–08	Metallurg Novokuznetsk	RSL	15	0	5	5	22	—	—	—	—	—
2007–08	HC Fribourg–Gottéron	NLA	6	0	2	2	2	—	—	—	—	—
2007–08	Frederikshavn White Hawks	DEN	19	3	11	14	18	18	4	8	12	32
2008–09	Dinamo Rīga	KHL	29	0	5	5	44	1	0	0	0	0
2008–09	HK Rīga 2000	BLR	4	0	2	2	10	—	—	—	—	—
2008–09	HK Rīga 2000	LAT	—	—	—	—	—	6	1	3	4	10
2009–10	Dinamo Rīga	KHL	50	4	13	17	44	9	1	2	3	8
2010–11	WSV Sterzing Broncos	ITA.2	28	0	16	16	24	13	3	12	15	8
2011–12	HK Concept Rīga	LAT	5	3	6	9	8	—	—	—	—	—
2011–12	Saryarka Karagandy	KAZ	5	1	3	4	14	11	0	3	3	6
2012–13	SMScredit.lv	LAT	24	8	19	27	32	5	0	3	3	4
2014–15	HK Mogo	LAT	20	4	23	27	18	10	2	9	11	12
2015–16	HK Mogo	LAT	3	0	2	2	0	—	—	—	—	—
2016–17	Venta 2002	LAT.2	2	0	2	2	10	3	1	3	4	2
Latvia totals			97	38	83	121	88	24	3	16	19	30
FIN.2 totals			109	18	41	59	127	22	7	5	12	14
SM-l totals			126	14	33	47	92	2	0	0	0	0

- LAT stats do not include numbers from the 1995–96 and 2002–03 seasons.

=== International ===
Year	Team	Event	GP	G	A	Pts	PIM
1994	Latvia	WJC C	4	2	5	7	4
2001	Latvia	OGQ	3	0	0	0	4
2001	Latvia	WC	6	0	0	0	0
2002	Latvia	OG	4	0	2	2	4
2002	Latvia	WC	6	0	2	2	4
2003	Latvia	WC	6	1	3	4	2
2004	Latvia	WC	7	0	2	2	2
2005	Latvia	WC	6	0	0	0	4
2007	Latvia	WC	6	2	4	6	6
2009	Latvia	OGQ	3	0	2	2	2
2009	Latvia	WC	5	0	0	0	2
Senior totals			52	3	15	18	30
