= Juris Štāls =

Latvian ice hockey player (born 1982)

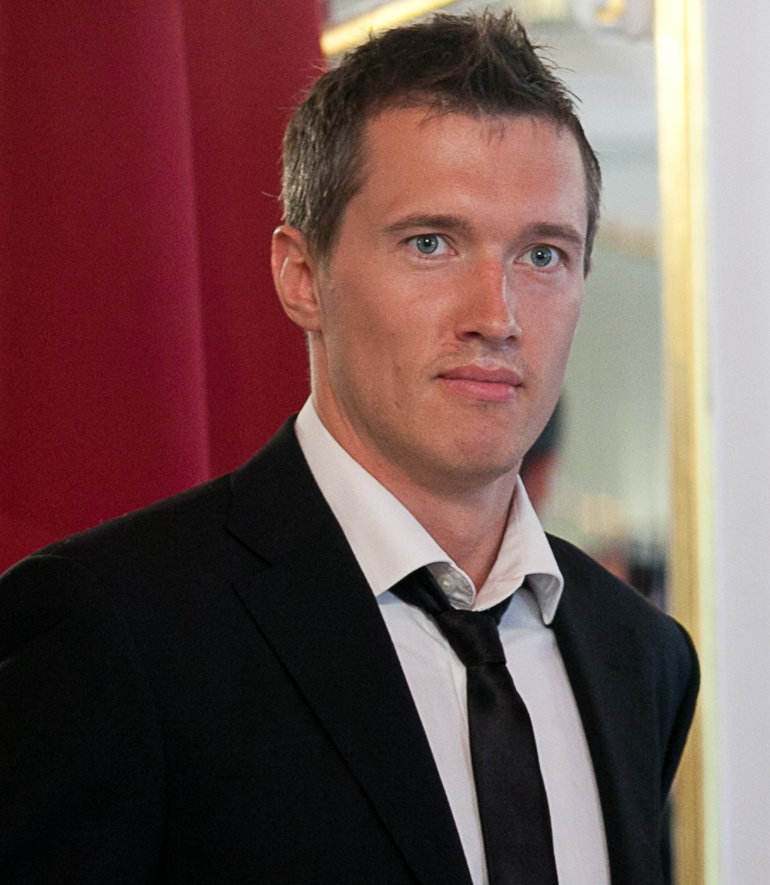
- Born: April 8, 1982 (age 44) Riga, Latvian SSR, Soviet Union
- Height: 6 ft 3 in (191 cm)
- Weight: 201 lb (91 kg; 14 st 5 lb)
- Position: Winger
- Shot: Left
- LHF team Former teams: HK Kurbads; Hartford Wolf Pack; Torpedo Nizhny Novgorod; HC Trinec; Dinamo Riga; Quad City Mallards; Kompanion Kiev; HK Riga 2000; HK Poprad
- National team: Latvia
- NHL draft: 269th overall, 2001; New York Rangers
- Playing career: 1999–2020

Juris Štāls (born April 8, 1982) is a Latvian former ice hockey player. He last played as a right wing for HK Kurbads of Latvian Hockey Higher League. He was drafted in the ninth round (269th overall) of the 2001 NHL entry draft by the New York Rangers. He also played for the Latvian national ice hockey team at the 2014 Winter Olympics.

== Playing career ==
He started his career in 1999, when he joined the Lukko junior team, and played there for two seasons. In 2001, the New York Rangers drafted him 269th overall, and he went to North America to play for Sarnia Sting in the Ontario Hockey League (OHL). In 2002-03 he mostly played with the Owen Sound Attack of the OHL, and for Vaasan Sport, plus two games for the Hartford Wolf Pack of the American Hockey League (AHL). In 2003-04, he continued to play for Hartford, but from 2004 to 2006 he played for New York Rangers affiliate Charlotte Checkers of the ECHL.

In 2006, he returned to Europe to play for Torpedo Nizhny Novgorod in the Russian Hockey League. Later he played for Ocelari Trinec in the Czech Extraliga, Neman Grodno in the Belarusian Extraleague and HK Riga 2000 in the Latvian Hockey League.

From 2009 to 2012, Juris played 59 games for Dinamo Riga of the Kontinental Hockey League (KHL). He started the 2012-13 season with Kompanion Kiev of the Ukrainian Hockey League, but ended the season with HK Poprad of the Slovak Extraliga.

== Career statistics ==
=== Regular season and playoffs ===
			Regular season					Playoffs
Season	Team	League	GP	G	A	Pts	PIM	GP	G	A	Pts	PIM
1999–2000	Lukko	FIN U20	2	1	0	1	2	—	—	—	—	—
2000–01	Lukko	FIN U20	42	22	22	44	26	3	1	0	1	0
2001–02	Sarnia Sting	OHL	60	23	22	45	12	5	0	1	1	2
2002–03	Sport	FIN.2	23	3	3	6	16	—	—	—	—	—
2002–03	Owen Sound Attack	OHL	25	8	15	23	14	4	0	4	4	4
2002–03	Hartford Wolf Pack	AHL	2	0	1	1	0	—	—	—	—	—
2003–04	Hartford Wolf Pack	AHL	62	4	14	18	24	1	0	0	0	0
2004–05	Charlotte Checkers	ECHL	59	19	11	30	31	—	—	—	—	—
2005–06	Charlotte Checkers	ECHL	66	18	27	45	36	3	1	0	1	0
2006–07	Torpedo Nizhny Novgorod	RUS.2	17	2	6	8	2	—	—	—	—	—
2006–07	Torpedo–2 Nizhny Novgorod	RUS.3	3	3	2	5	2	—	—	—	—	—
2006–07	HC Oceláři Třinec	ELH	5	1	1	2	2	—	—	—	—	—
2007–08	HC Oceláři Třinec	ELH	8	0	0	0	12	—	—	—	—	—
2007–08	Neman Grodno	BLR	9	1	2	3	10	—	—	—	—	—
2007–08	HK Rīga 2000	LAT	13	7	8	15	10	7	2	5	7	2
2008–09	Dinamo Rīga	KHL	19	1	2	3	8	—	—	—	—	—
2008–09	HK Rīga 2000	BLR	17	9	8	17	16	—	—	—	—	—
2009–10	Quad City Mallards	IHL	74	26	26	52	36	—	—	—	—	—
2010–11	Dinamo Rīga	KHL	26	0	1	1	10	6	0	0	0	6
2012–13	Kompanion Kiev	UKR	28	3	9	12	50	—	—	—	—	—
2012–13	HK AutoFinance Poprad	SVK	8	2	1	3	14	7	0	2	2	6
2013–14	HK Poprad	SVK	44	15	25	40	24	5	2	1	3	2
2014–15	HC Energie Karlovy Vary	ELH	24	0	2	2	6	—	—	—	—	—
2014–15	HK Poprad	SVK	17	2	4	6	18	12	0	1	1	4
2015–16	HK Kurbads	LAT	26	6	18	24	8	14	9	7	16	12
2016–17	HK Kurbads	LAT	27	9	8	17	38	12	1	7	8	4
2017–18	HK Kurbads	LAT	21	5	0	5	14	1	0	0	0	0
2017–18	Daugavpils	LAT.2	6	8	8	16	2	—	—	—	—	—
2018–19	HK Kurbads	LAT	29	6	1	7	12	10	0	1	1	4
2019–20	HK Kurbads	LAT	21	3	2	5	39	—	—	—	—	—
AHL totals			64	4	15	19	24	1	0	0	0	0
LAT totals			137	36	37	73	121	44	12	20	32	22
KHL totals			59	3	4	7	20	12	0	1	1	6

=== International ===
Year	Team	Event	GP	G	A	Pts	PIM
1999	Latvia	EJC D1	4	5	5	10	2
2001	Latvia	WJC D1	5	1	4	5	2
2002	Latvia	WJC D2	4	7	4	11	4
2005	Latvia	OGQ	3	0	0	0	0
2006	Latvia	WC	6	0	0	0	4
2008	Latvia	WC	6	0	0	0	2
2009	Latvia	OGQ	3	0	0	0	2
2010	Latvia	WC	4	0	2	2	0
2011	Latvia	WC	3	0	0	0	0
2012	Latvia	WC	7	0	0	0	0
2013	Latvia	OGQ	3	1	1	2	0
2013	Latvia	WC	7	0	0	0	4
2014	Latvia	OG	3	0	0	0	0
2014	Latvia	WC	6	1	2	3	6
Junior totals			13	13	13	26	8
Senior totals			51	2	5	7	18
