= Rodrigo Laviņš =

Latvian ice hockey player

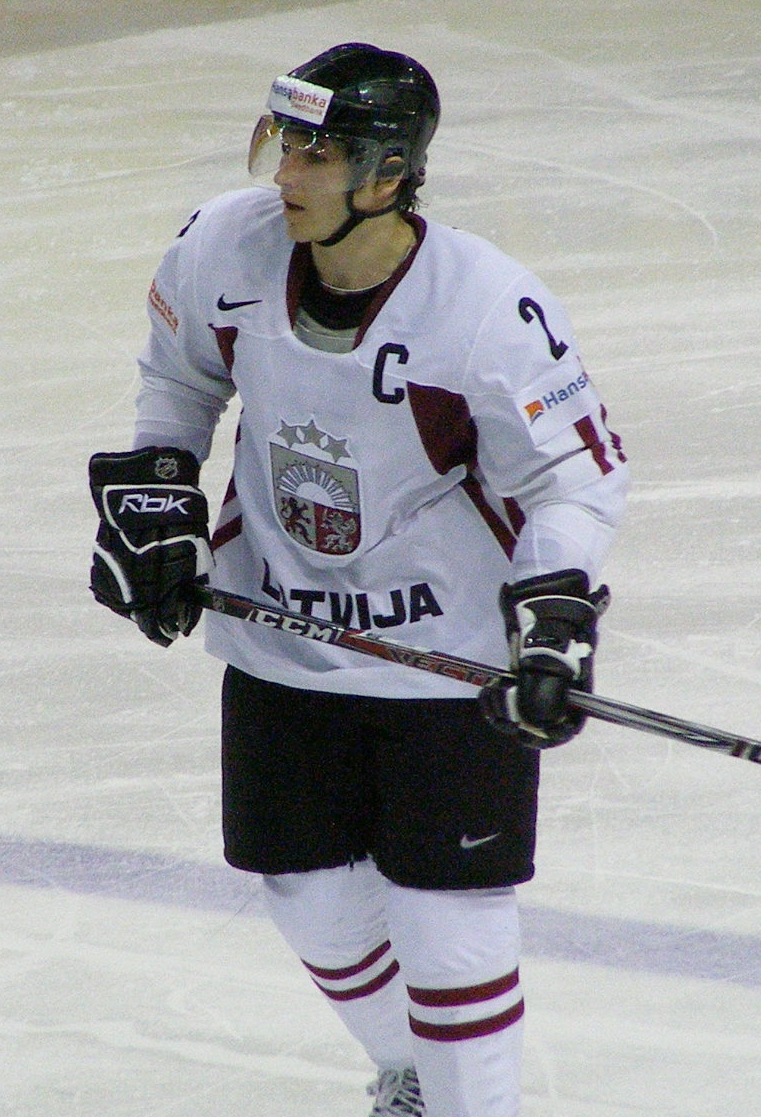
- Born: 3 August 1974 (age 52) Riga, Latvian SSR, Soviet Union
- Height: 5 ft 10 in (178 cm)
- Weight: 185 lb (84 kg; 13 st 3 lb)
- Position: Defence
- Shot: Left
- Played for: Pārdaugava Rīga; Jokerit; AIK; Ilves; HPK; Augsburger Panther; Molot-Prikamye Perm; HC Dynamo Moscow; HK Riga 2000; Brynäs IF; Metallurg Novokuznetsk; Södertälje SK; Dinamo Riga; HK Liepājas Metalurgs; HK Kurbads
- National team: Latvia
- NHL draft: Undrafted
- Playing career: 1990–2019

Rodrigo Laviņš (born 3 August 1974) is a Latvian former professional ice hockey coach and former defenceman. He currently holds the record for most caps in the Latvian national team, haveing played in 226 games.

== Playing career ==
Laviņš began his career with his hometown team Pārdaugava Rīga. He then moved to North America in 1994, starting with the East Coast Hockey League where he played for the Raleigh IceCaps and the Tallahassee Tiger Sharks. He also had a spell in the Colonial Hockey League with the Muskegon Fury. In 1997, he moved to the International Hockey League with the Las Vegas Thunder. He then moved to the Tacoma Sabercats of the West Coast Hockey League the same season.

Laviņš returned to Europe in 1998, splitting the year in Finland's SM-liiga with Jokerit and Sweden's Elitserien with AIK. He returned to Finland the next season, splitting the year with HPK and Ilves before moving to the Deutsche Eishockey Liga in Germany, suiting up for the Augsburger Panther. Laviņš returned to Russia in 2001 where he spent two seasons, playing for Molot-Prikamye Perm and Dynamo Moscow.

He returned to Latvia in 2003, signing with HK Riga 2000 where he stayed for three seasons. He came back to Sweden in 2005, joining Brynäs IF for two seasons and then split 2007-08 with Södertälje SK and Russian side Metallurg Novokuznetsk.

In the 2008–09 season, he played for Dinamo Riga in the newly formed Kontinental Hockey League, remaining with the team through the 2013-2014 season. Laviņš joined HK Kurbads in the Latvian league for the next 2 seasons, acting as a player-assistant coach in the 2015-16 season. He stopped playing the following season and became head coach for one year, winning the Latvian Hockey League in the 2016-17 season.

== International ==
He was named to the Latvia men's national ice hockey team for competition at the 2014 IIHF World Championship.

== Coaching career ==
Upon retirement, in 2015 Laviņš founded his youth academy - the R. Laviņš Hockey School (R. Laviņa hokeja skola, also the R. Laviņš Sports Studio; R. Laviņa sporta studija), which fields the teams Baltu Vilki (notable alumni include Alberts Šmits), Mārupe Baltu Vilki and Baltu Lūši.

== Personal life ==
Laviņš' son, Martins Rodrigo Laviņš, currently plays for the University of New Hampshire. He made his debut in the Latvian national team at the 2024 IIHF World Championship.

Rodrigo Laviņš owns a homestead in Jēkabpils Municipality (in the area of the former Sala Municipality).

== Career statistics ==
=== Regular season and playoffs ===
			Regular season					Playoffs
Season	Team	League	GP	G	A	Pts	PIM	GP	G	A	Pts	PIM
1990–91	RASMS Rīga	USSR-3	6	0	0	0	0	—	—	—	—	—
1991–92	RASMS Rīga	CIS-3	32	4	3	7	6	—	—	—	—	—
1992–93	Pārdaugava Rīga	IHL	41	1	6	7	20	2	0	0	0	2
1992–93	Pārdaugava Rīga	LAT	11	3	2	5	6	—	—	—	—	—
1993–94	Pārdaugava Rīga	IHL	30	0	0	0	16	2	0	0	0	4
1994–95	Raleigh IceCaps	ECHL	25	2	7	9	30	—	—	—	—	—
1994–95	Tallahassee Tiger Sharks	ECHL	44	3	9	12	36	11	0	3	3	8
1995–96	Tallahassee Tiger Sharks	ECHL	52	10	14	24	86	2	0	1	1	0
1996–97	Muskegon Fury	CoHL	16	4	4	8	16	—	—	—	—	—
1996–97	Tallahassee Tiger Sharks	ECHL	50	11	27	38	45	1	0	0	0	2
1997–98	Tacoma Sabercats	WCHL	10	4	4	8	6	8	2	10	12	8
1997–98	Las Vegas Thunder	IHL	48	3	7	10	53	3	0	0	0	2
1998–99	Jokerit	SM-l	10	0	2	2	14	—	—	—	—	—
1998–99	AIK	SEL	15	1	2	3	10	—	—	—	—	—
1999–00	Ilves	SM-l	31	4	4	8	59	—	—	—	—	—
1999–00	HPK	SM-l	22	3	8	11	22	8	1	1	2	10
2000–01	Augsburger Panther	DEL	46	1	5	6	38	—	—	—	—	—
2001–02	Molot–Prikamye Perm	RSL	43	5	5	10	36	—	—	—	—	—
2002–03	Dynamo Moscow	RSL	24	1	6	7	20	3	0	1	1	6
2002–03	Dynamo–2 Moscow	RUS-3	6	1	2	3	10	—	—	—	—	—
2003–04	HK Rīga 2000	LAT	—	—	—	—	—	3	0	2	2	4
2004–05	HK Rīga 2000	BLR	42	6	21	27	10	3	0	0	0	0
2004–05	HK Rīga 2000	LAT	4	0	2	2	2	8	0	5	5	2
2005–06	Brynäs IF	SEL	45	5	2	7	28	4	0	2	2	2
2006–07	HK Rīga 2000	LAT	6	1	4	5	6	—	—	—	—	—
2006–07	Brynäs IF	SEL	43	0	2	2	42	7	1	0	1	6
2007–08	Metallurg Novokuznetsk	RSL	13	0	2	2	18	—	—	—	—	—
2007–08	Södertälje SK	SEL	34	0	1	1	10	—	—	—	—	—
2008–09	Dinamo Rīga	KHL	49	1	6	7	22	3	0	0	0	4
2009–10	Dinamo Rīga	KHL	52	3	8	11	30	6	0	1	1	4
2010–11	Dinamo Rīga	KHL	32	4	3	7	20	9	0	1	1	6
2011–12	Dinamo Rīga	KHL	28	0	1	1	23	—	—	—	—	—
2012–13	Dinamo Rīga	KHL	30	0	1	1	16	—	—	—	—	—
2012–13	HK Liepājas Metalurgs	BLR	9	2	1	3	14	—	—	—	—	—
2013–14	Dinamo Rīga	KHL	15	0	1	1	4	—	—	—	—	—
2014–15	HK Kurbads	LAT	26	3	18	21	14	12	0	4	4	4
2015–16	HK Kurbads	LAT	13	2	10	12	0	1	0	0	0	0
2018–19	HK AKO/Mārupe	LAT-2	4	0	1	1	0	—	—	—	—	—
ECHL totals			171	26	57	83	197	14	0	4	4	10
SEL totals			137	6	7	13	90	11	1	2	3	8
KHL totals			206	8	20	28	115	21	0	3	3	16

=== International ===
Year	Team	Event	GP	G	A	Pts	PIM
1993	Latvia	WC C	6	1	0	1	4
1994	Latvia	WJC	4	1	9	10	2
1996	Latvia	WC B	7	0	0	0	0
1997	Latvia	WC	8	0	3	3	4
1998	Latvia	WC	6	0	1	1	6
1999	Latvia	WC	6	0	0	0	2
1999	Latvia	WC Q	3	0	0	0	2
2000	Latvia	WC	7	1	2	3	4
2002	Latvia	OLY	4	0	0	0	4
2002	Latvia	WC	6	1	1	2	2
2003	Latvia	WC	6	0	2	2	4
2005	Latvia	OGQ	3	0	0	0	0
2005	Latvia	WC	6	0	1	1	2
2006	Latvia	OLY	5	0	1	1	0
2007	Latvia	WC	6	1	3	4	27
2008	Latvia	WC	6	0	2	2	16
2009	Latvia	WC	6	0	2	2	4
2010	Latvia	OLY	4	0	0	0	2
2012	Latvia	WC	7	0	0	0	0
2014	Latvia	WC	7	0	0	0	6
Junior totals			4	1	9	10	2
Senior totals			109	4	18	22	89
