= Roberts Mamčics =

Latvian ice hockey player (born 1995)

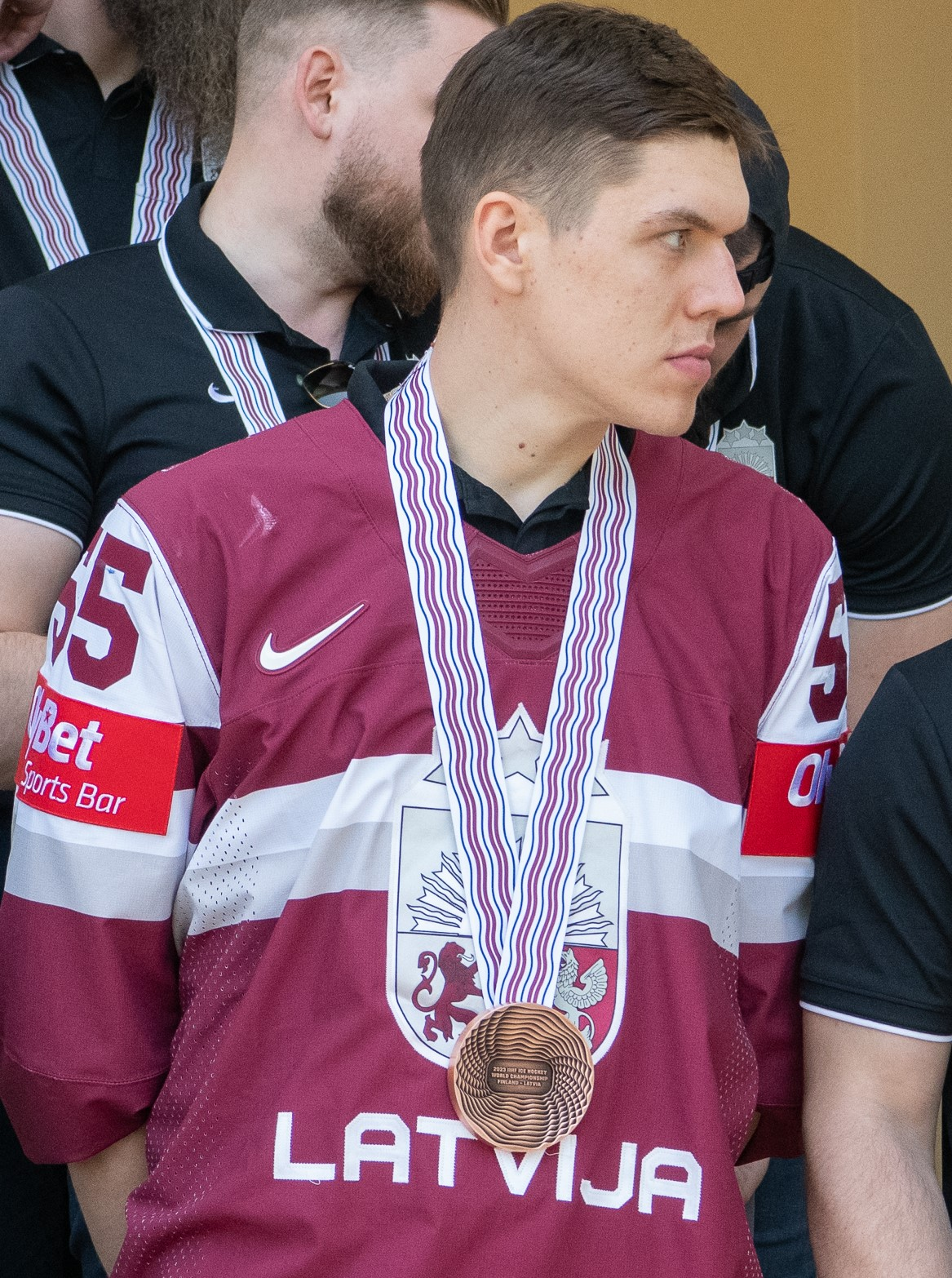
- Mamčics in 2023
- Born: 6 April 1995 (age 31) Liepāja, Latvia
- Height: 196 cm (6 ft 5 in)
- Weight: 105 kg (231 lb; 16 st 7 lb)
- Position: Defenceman
- Shoots: Left
- Czech team Former teams: HC Energie Karlovy Vary; Dinamo Riga; PSG Berani Zlín; Linköping HC; HC Nové Zámky
- National team: Latvia
- Playing career: 2017–present

Roberts Mamčics (born 6 April 1995) is a Latvian professional ice hockey player who is a defenceman for HC Energie Karlovy Vary of the Czech Extraliga (ELH).

== Playing career ==
On 22 September 2023, Mamčics scored a hat-trick for HC Nové Zámky in a 7–2 against HK Dukla Trenčín.

He signed with HC Energie Karlovy Vary in June 2024.

== International play ==
Mamčics represented the Latvia national team at the 2022 and 2026 Winter Olympics, and the 2022, 2023, 2024, and 2025 IIHF World Championship.

== Career statistics ==
=== Regular season and playoffs ===
| | | | Regular season | | | | | Playoffs |
| Season | Team | League | GP | G | A | Pts | PIM | GP | G | A | Pts | PIM |
|---|---|---|---|---|---|---|---|---|---|---|---|---|
| 2010–11 | Metalurgs Liepāja U18 | Latvia U18 | 22 | 4 | 9 | 13 | 10 | — | — | — | — | — |
| 2011–12 | Metalurgs Liepāja-2 | Latvia | 34 | 5 | 1 | 6 | 18 | 10 | 1 | 1 | 2 | 2 |
| 2012–13 | Metalurgs Liepāja-2 | Latvia | 15 | 3 | 0 | 3 | 18 | 1 | 0 | 0 | 0 | 4 |
| 2012–13 | Metalurgs Liepāja-2 | MHL-B | 28 | 7 | 9 | 16 | 41 | 10 | 0 | 2 | 2 | 8 |
| 2013–14 | Sputnik Almetievsk | MHL-B | 38 | 2 | 10 | 12 | 34 | 15 | 0 | 4 | 4 | 14 |
| 2014–15 | HK Zelenograd | MHL-B | 56 | 3 | 13 | 16 | 77 | 12 | 0 | 1 | 1 | 4 |
| 2015–16 | Hasle-Løren IL | First Division | 35 | 1 | 11 | 12 | 70 | — | — | — | — | — |
| 2016–17 | Hasle-Løren IL | First Division | 34 | 3 | 6 | 9 | 68 | — | — | — | — | — |
| 2016–17 | Lørenskog IK | GET-ligaen | 2 | 0 | 0 | 0 | 0 | — | — | — | — | — |
| 2017–18 | HK Liepāja | Latvia | 27 | 10 | 16 | 26 | 18 | 5 | 0 | 0 | 0 | 6 |
| 2018–19 | Dinamo Riga | KHL | 10 | 0 | 0 | 0 | 0 | — | — | — | — | — |
| 2018–19 | HK Liepāja | Latvia | 20 | 7 | 18 | 25 | 28 | — | — | — | — | — |
| 2019–20 | Dinamo Riga | KHL | 45 | 2 | 5 | 7 | 14 | — | — | — | — | — |
| 2019–20 | HK Liepāja | Latvia | 2 | 0 | 0 | 0 | 4 | — | — | — | — | — |
| 2020–21 | Dinamo Riga | KHL | 43 | 1 | 5 | 6 | 45 | — | — | — | — | — |
| 2020–21 | HK Zemgale | Latvia | 4 | 0 | 4 | 4 | 2 | — | — | — | — | — |
| 2021–22 | Dinamo Riga | KHL | 2 | 0 | 0 | 0 | 0 | — | — | — | — | — |
| 2021–22 | HK Zemgale | Latvia | 1 | 0 | 0 | 0 | 0 | — | — | — | — | — |
| 2021–22 | Berani Zlín | Czech | 24 | 0 | 7 | 7 | 33 | — | — | — | — | — |
| 2021–22 | Linköping HC | SHL | 12 | 0 | 1 | 1 | 6 | — | — | — | — | — |
| 2022–23 | HC Nové Zámky | Slovak | 34 | 0 | 9 | 9 | 39 | 5 | 1 | 1 | 2 | 2 |
| 2023–24 | HC Nové Zámky | Slovak | 45 | 7 | 19 | 26 | 59 | — | — | — | — | — |
| 2024–25 | HC Energie Karlovy Vary | Czech | 42 | 1 | 5 | 6 | 49 | 4 | 0 | 1 | 1 | 0 |
| 2025–26 | HC Energie Karlovy Vary | Czech | 46 | 0 | 8 | 8 | 43 | 15 | 1 | 2 | 3 | 6 |
| KHL totals | | | 100 | 3 | 10 | 13 | 59 | — | — | — | — | — |
| Czech totals | | | 112 | 1 | 20 | 21 | 125 | 19 | 1 | 3 | 4 | 6 |

=== International ===
| Year | Team | Event | GP | G | A | Pts | PIM |
|---|---|---|---|---|---|---|---|
| 2013 | Latvia U18 | WJC-18 | 6 | 0 | 0 | 0 | 8 |
| 2022 | Latvia | OG | 4 | 0 | 0 | 0 | 0 |
| 2022 | Latvia | WC | 7 | 0 | 0 | 0 | 0 |
| 2023 | Latvia | WC | 5 | 0 | 0 | 0 | 2 |
| 2024 | Latvia | WC | 7 | 3 | 0 | 3 | 4 |
| 2024 | Latvia | OGQ | 3 | 0 | 1 | 1 | 2 |
| 2025 | Latvia | WC | 7 | 0 | 1 | 1 | 2 |
| 2026 | Latvia | OG | 4 | 0 | 0 | 0 | 4 |
| 2026 | Latvia | WC | 8 | 0 | 1 | 1 | 6 |
| Junior totals | | | 6 | 0 | 0 | 0 | 8 |
| Senior totals | | | 45 | 3 | 3 | 6 | 20 |
