= Uvis Balinskis =

Latvian ice hockey player (born 1996)

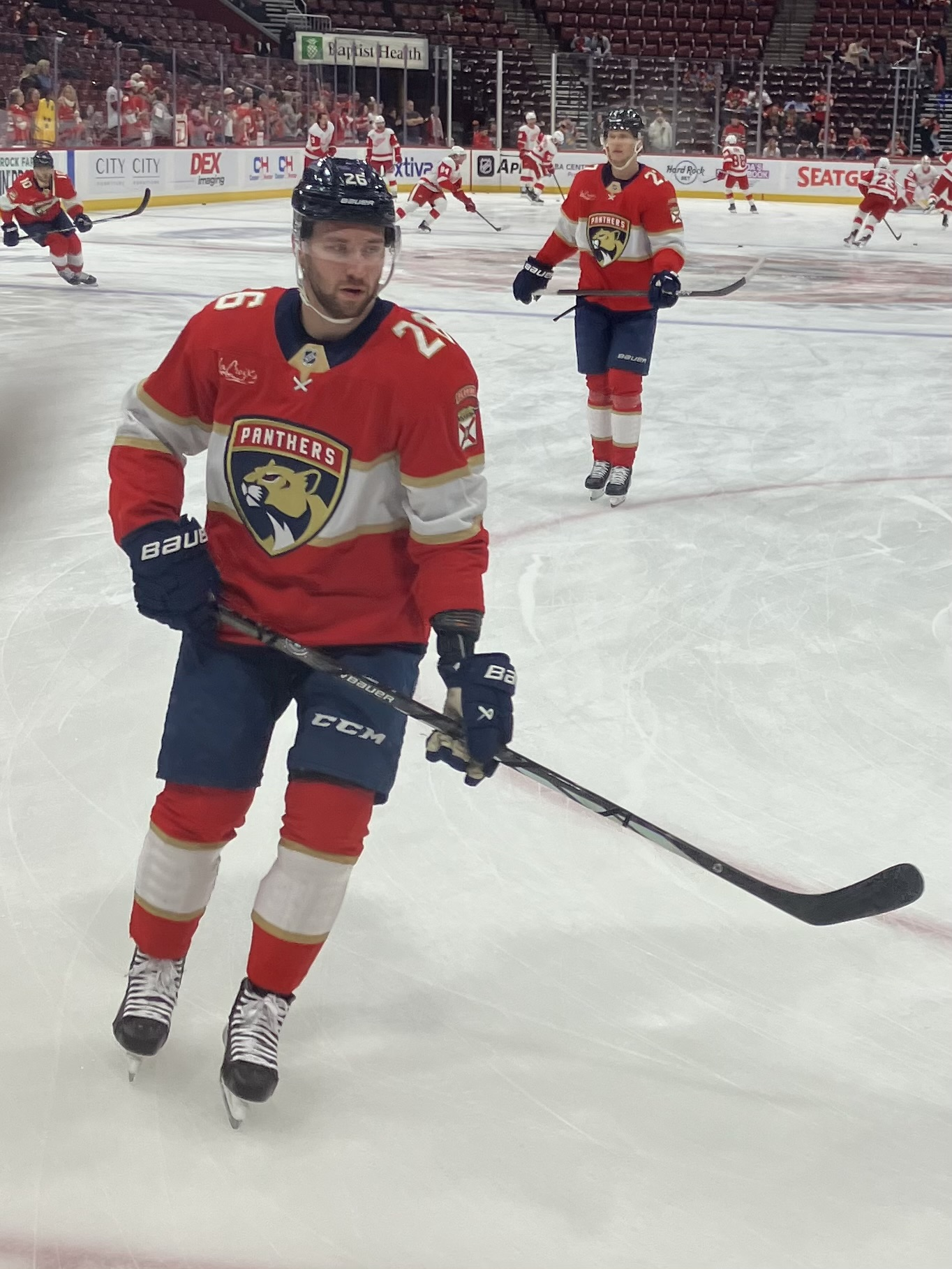
- Balinskis with the Panthers in 2025
- Born: 1 August 1996 (age 30) Ventspils, Latvia
- Height: 6 ft 0 in (183 cm)
- Weight: 196 lb (89 kg; 14 st 0 lb)
- Position: Defence
- Shoots: Left
- NHL team Former teams: Florida Panthers; Dinamo Riga; HK Liepāja; HC Litvínov; HC Bílí Tygři Liberec
- National team: Latvia
- NHL draft: Undrafted
- Playing career: 2015–present

Uvis Jānis Balinskis (born 1 August 1996) is a Latvian professional ice hockey player who is a defenceman for the Florida Panthers of the National Hockey League (NHL). He made his NHL debut with Florida in 2023, and won the Stanley Cup with the Panthers in 2025. Prior to the NHL Balinskis played several years in different European leagues, with his first senior professional games coming in 2015. Internationally Balinskis has represented the Latvian national team at several World Championships, and won a bronze medal in 2023.

== Playing career ==
On 18 April 2023, Balinskis signed a one-year, entry-level contract with the Florida Panthers.

== International play ==
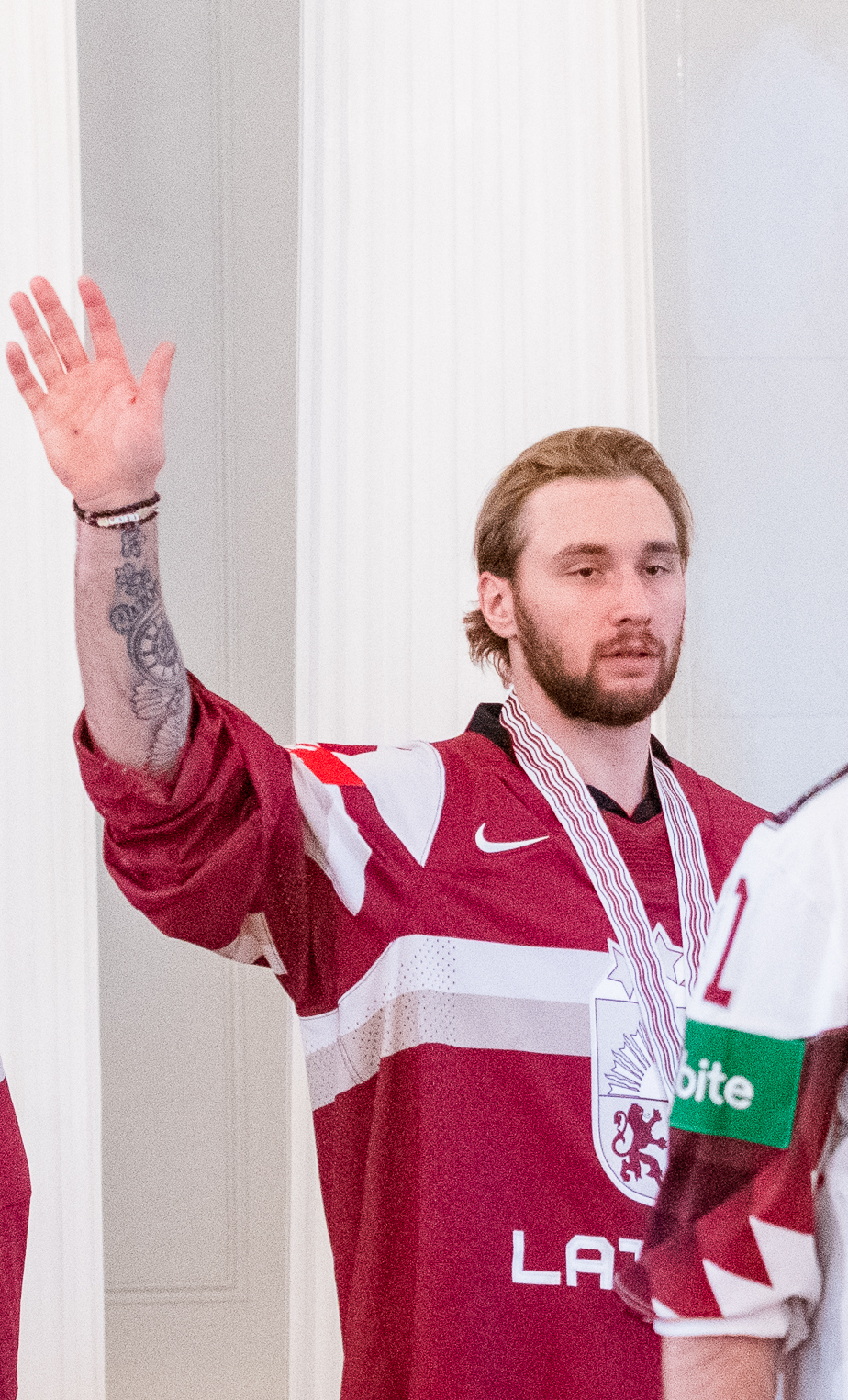
- Balinskis in 2023

Medal record

Men's ice hockey

Representing Latvia

World Championships
Bronze medal – third place	2023 Finland/Latvia	

Balinskis participated at the 2017 World Championship, 2018 World Championship and 2019 World Championship.

He represented Latvia at the 2023 World Championship where he recorded two assists and won a bronze medal, Latvia's first ever World Championship medal.

== Career statistics ==
=== Regular season and playoffs ===
			Regular season					Playoffs
Season	Team	League	GP	G	A	Pts	PIM	GP	G	A	Pts	PIM
2011–12	Tukums	LAT U16	26	4	10	14	12	—	—	—	—	—
2012–13	Tukums	LAT U18	19	8	11	19	6	—	—	—	—	—
2013–14	Augsburger Panther	GER.2 U18	27	11	19	30	32	6	1	0	1	4
2013–14	Augsburger Panther	GER.2 U20	4	1	1	2	2	—	—	—	—	—
2014–15	Augsburger Panther	DNL Q	20	3	4	7	42	—	—	—	—	—
2014–15	Augsburger Panther	DNL2	20	5	14	19	14	—	—	—	—	—
2015–16	HK Riga	MHL	36	7	11	18	24	—	—	—	—	—
2015–16	Dinamo Riga	KHL	1	0	0	0	0	—	—	—	—	—
2016–17	HK Riga	MHL	30	3	9	12	24	—	—	—	—	—
2016–17	Dinamo Riga	KHL	21	2	3	5	6	—	—	—	—	—
2017–18	Dinamo Riga	KHL	28	2	3	5	4	—	—	—	—	—
2017–18	HK Liepāja	LAT	2	0	1	1	2	—	—	—	—	—
2018–19	Dinamo Riga	KHL	37	1	10	11	16	—	—	—	—	—
2019–20	Dinamo Riga	KHL	48	5	8	13	20	—	—	—	—	—
2020–21	HC Verva Litvínov	ELH	48	5	12	17	18	3	0	0	0	2
2021–22	HC Verva Litvínov	ELH	42	9	14	23	22	—	—	—	—	—
2022–23	HC Bílí Tygři Liberec	ELH	50	11	24	35	22	10	1	6	7	4
2023–24	Florida Panthers	NHL	26	1	2	3	8	—	—	—	—	—
2023–24	Charlotte Checkers	AHL	37	3	18	21	31	—	—	—	—	—
2024–25	Florida Panthers	NHL	76	4	14	18	27	5	1	0	1	2
2025–26	Florida Panthers	NHL	54	5	10	15	30	—	—	—	—	—
KHL totals			135	10	24	34	46	—	—	—	—	—
NHL totals			156	10	26	36	65	5	1	0	1	2

=== International ===
Year	Team	Event	Results	GP	G	A	Pts	PIM
2016	Latvia	WJC D1A	1st	5	0	1	1	2
2017	Latvia	WC	10th	7	0	2	2	4
2018	Latvia	WC	8th	5	1	1	2	0
2019	Latvia	WC	10th	7	0	1	1	4
2021	Latvia	WC	11th	7	0	2	2	4
2021	Latvia	OGQ	Q	3	0	2	2	0
2022	Latvia	OG	11th	4	0	3	3	0
2023	Latvia	WC	3rd place, bronze medalist(s)	10	0	2	2	4
2024	Latvia	OGQ	Q	3	1	3	4	2
2026	Latvia	OG	10th	4	0	1	1	2
Junior totals				5	0	1	1	2
Senior totals				50	2	17	19	20

== Awards and honours ==
Award	Year	Ref
NHL
Stanley Cup champion	2025	
