= Jēkabs Rēdlihs =

Latvian ice hockey player

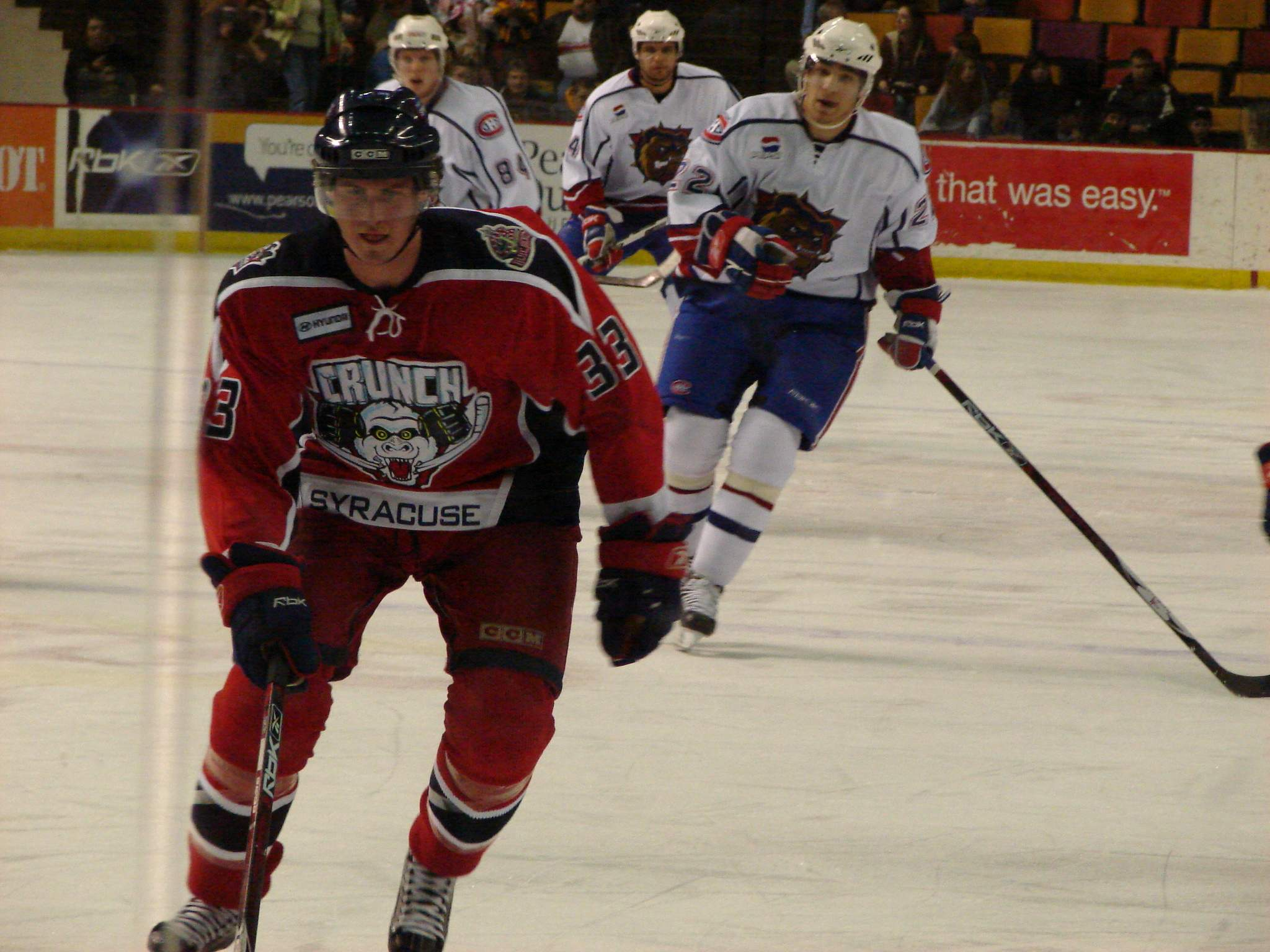
- Rēdlihs with the Syracuse Crunch in 2007
- Born: March 29, 1982 (age 44) Riga, Latvian SSR, Soviet Union
- Height: 6 ft 0 in (183 cm)
- Weight: 190 lb (86 kg; 13 st 8 lb)
- Position: Defenceman
- Shot: Left
- Played for: HK Liepājas Metalurgs; Syracuse Crunch; HC Plzeň; Dinamo Riga; Modo Hockey; HC Karlovy Vary; Piráti Chomutov; HK Kurbads
- National team: Latvia
- NHL draft: 119th overall, 2002; Columbus Blue Jackets
- Playing career: 2000–2022

Jēkabs Rēdlihs (born March 29, 1982) is a Latvian former ice hockey defenceman.

== Playing career ==
Rēdlihs was selected in the fourth round 119th overall by the Columbus Blue Jackets in the 2002 NHL entry draft. Drafted from the New York Applecore of the EJHL, Rēdlihs then enrolled with Boston University of the Hockey East and completed a four-collegiate career with the Terriers earning Hockey East All-Rookie honors in his freshman year.

After his 2005–06 senior season with the Hockey East champions, Rēdlihs made his professional debut when he signed an ATO contract with the Blue Jackets affiliate, the Syracuse Crunch of the AHL on March 30, 2006.

Un-signed by Columbus, Rēdlihs was invited to the Blue Jackets training camp for the 2006–07 season but was then reassigned to play with the Syracuse Crunch and second tier affiliate, the Dayton Bombers of the ECHL. He was again invited to the Blue Jackets 2007–08 training camp on September 10, 2007, but was later released to the Crunch on September 20, 2007.

After spending the majority of the season with the Elmira Jackals of the ECHL, Rēdlihs left North America when he signed with HC Plzeň of the Czech Extraliga on January 9, 2008. Helping to strengthen 1929's defense, he was then re-signed to a one-year contract for the 2008–09 season on March 31, 2008.

On July 17, 2009, Rēdlihs, a free agent, signed a two-year contract with Dinamo Riga of the KHL.

On June 1, 2015, Rēdlihs continued his career in the Czech Extraliga in signing with Piráti Chomutov after one season with HC Karlovy Vary.

== Personal ==
Jēkabs Rēdlihs has three brothers. Two of them, Miķelis Rēdlihs and Krišjānis Rēdlihs, are hockey players. All three brothers have appeared together in Latvia national team.

== Career statistics ==
=== Regular season and playoffs ===
			Regular season					Playoffs
Season	Team	League	GP	G	A	Pts	PIM	GP	G	A	Pts	PIM
1999–2000	HK Liepājas Metalurgs	EEHL	11	0	0	0	2	—	—	—	—	—
1999–2000	Juniors Essamika Rīga	EEHL B	16	1	4	5	6	—	—	—	—	—
1999–2000	Juniors Essamika Rīga	LAT	14	2	3	5	10	—	—	—	—	—
2000–01	HK Liepājas Metalurgs	EEHL	31	1	3	4		—	—	—	—	—
2000–01	HK Liepājas Metalurgs	LAT	23	4	5	9		—	—	—	—	—
2001–02	New York Applecore	EJHL	38	3	16	19	24	—	—	—	—	—
2002–03	Boston University	HE	40	4	12	16	12	—	—	—	—	—
2003–04	Boston University	HE	23	2	4	6	53	—	—	—	—	—
2004–05	Boston University	HE	40	1	0	1	32	—	—	—	—	—
2005–06	Boston University	HE	27	1	5	6	34	—	—	—	—	—
2005–06	Syracuse Crunch	AHL	4	0	0	0	6	—	—	—	—	—
2006–07	Dayton Bombers	ECHL	7	0	1	1	4	—	—	—	—	—
2006–07	Syracuse Crunch	AHL	46	3	9	12	42	—	—	—	—	—
2006–07	HK Rīga 2000	LAT	4	2	1	3	6	—	—	—	—	—
2007–08	Syracuse Crunch	AHL	13	1	2	3	10	—	—	—	—	—
2007–08	Elmira Jackals	ECHL	21	0	4	4	21	—	—	—	—	—
2007–08	HC Lasselsberger Plzeň	ELH	13	1	2	3	14	4	0	0	0	2
2008–09	HC Lasselsberger Plzeň	ELH	41	3	2	5	49	12	0	1	1	37
2009–10	Dinamo Rīga	KHL	35	1	2	3	86	7	0	1	1	10
2009–10	HK Dinamo/Juniors	BLR	3	0	0	0	6	—	—	—	—	—
2009–10	HK Dinamo/Juniors	LAT	—	—	—	—	—	5	1	1	2	2
2010–11	Dinamo Rīga	KHL	47	0	5	5	58	8	0	1	1	10
2011–12	Dinamo Rīga	KHL	46	2	1	3	35	6	1	1	2	8
2012–13	Dinamo Rīga	KHL	24	2	1	3	22	—	—	—	—	—
2012–13	HK Liepājas Metalurgs	BLR	3	0	0	0	4	—	—	—	—	—
2013–14	Modo Hockey	SHL	4	0	0	0	2	—	—	—	—	—
2013–14	Dinamo Rīga	KHL	12	0	0	0	10	7	0	0	0	4
2014–15	HC Energie Karlovy Vary	ELH	50	1	7	8	69	—	—	—	—	—
2015–16	Piráti Chomutov	ELH	11	0	1	1	6	—	—	—	—	—
2015–16	HC Energie Karlovy Vary	ELH	21	0	2	2	14	—	—	—	—	—
2016–17	Dinamo Rīga	KHL	33	0	4	4	34	—	—	—	—	—
2017–18	HK Kurbads	LAT	23	0	3	3	18	9	1	0	1	2
2018–19	HK Kurbads	LAT	31	3	4	7	20	7	0	0	0	2
2019–20	HK Kurbads	LAT	29	2	11	13	66	—	—	—	—	—
2021–22	HK Kurbads	EST	6	1	3	4	6	—	—	—	—	—
LAT totals			124	13	27	40	120	21	1	2	3	6
ELH totals			136	5	14	19	152	21	1	1	2	43
KHL totals			197	5	13	18	245	28	1	3	4	32

=== International ===
Year	Team	Event	GP	G	A	Pts	PIM
1999	Latvia	EJC D1	4	1	1	2	2
2000	Latvia	WJC18 B	5	0	3	3	16
2002	Latvia	WJC D2	4	0	2	2	0
2008	Latvia	WC	4	0	0	0	2
2010	Latvia	WC	6	0	1	1	4
2011	Latvia	WC	6	1	1	2	4
2014	Latvia	WC	7	0	2	2	4
Junior totals			13	1	6	7	18
Senior totals			23	1	4	5	14

== Awards and honors ==
Award	Year
College
All-Hockey East Rookie Team	2003
Hockey East Champions	2006
