= Mārtiņš Dzierkals =

Latvian ice hockey player (born 1997)

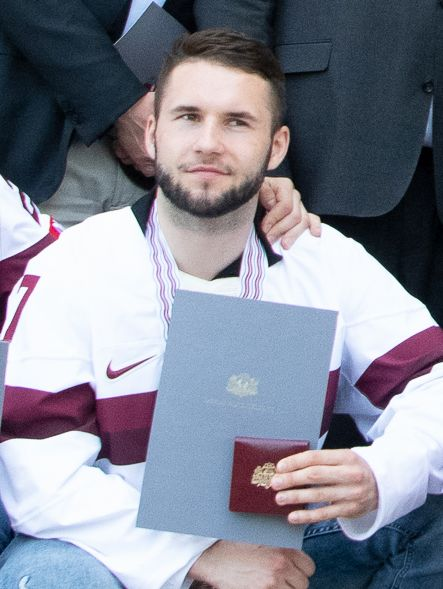
- Mārtiņš Dzierkals, 2023
- Born: 4 April 1997 (age 29) Riga, Latvia
- Height: 6 ft 0 in (183 cm)
- Weight: 185 lb (84 kg; 13 st 3 lb)
- Position: Forward
- Shoots: Left
- ELH team Former teams: HC Sparta Praha; Toronto Marlies; Dinamo Riga; Jukurit; HC Plzeň; Motor České Budějovice; Skellefteå AIK
- National team: Latvia
- NHL draft: 68th overall, 2015; Toronto Maple Leafs
- Playing career: 2014–present

Mārtiņš Dzierkals (born 4 April 1997) is a Latvian professional ice hockey player who is a forward for HC Sparta Praha of the Czech Extraliga (ELH).

== Playing career ==
In the 2015 NHL entry draft, he was selected 68th overall by the Toronto Maple Leafs. After two seasons with the Rouyn-Noranda Huskies in the Quebec Major Junior Hockey League, he spent much of the 2017–18 season with the Orlando Solar Bears in the ECHL, before returning to Latvia to play for the Dinamo Riga of the Kontinental Hockey League (KHL).

On trade deadline day of the 2019–20 NHL season, on 25 February 2020, the Maple Leafs traded Dzierkals rights away in a three-team trade to the Vegas Golden Knights via the Chicago Blackhawks, and gained a 5th-round pick in the 2020 NHL entry draft.

After spending the 2019–20 season with Jukurit in the Finnish Liiga, posting 7 goals and 15 points in 39 games, Dzierkals opted to return to his native Latvia by agreeing to a second tenure with Dinamo Riga with a one-year contract on 28 July 2020.

Following two seasons in the Swedish Hockey League with Skellefteå AIK, Dzierkals returned to the Czech Republic in signing a one-year contract with HC Sparta Praha of the ELH, on 29 May 2025.

== International play ==
Medal record

Representing Latvia

Ice hockey

World Championships
Bronze medal – third place	2023 Finland/Latvia	

He represented Latvia at the 2017 World Junior Ice Hockey Championships and the 2019 IIHF World Championship.

He represented Latvia at the 2023 IIHF World Championship where he recorded two goals and three assists and won a bronze medal, Latvia's first ever IIHF World Championship medal.

== Career statistics ==
=== Regular season and playoffs ===
			Regular season					Playoffs
Season	Team	League	GP	G	A	Pts	PIM	GP	G	A	Pts	PIM
2012–13	SK Sāga 18	LAT U18	20	28	31	59	16	—	—	—	—	—
2013–14	SK Sāga 18	LAT U20	23	35	33	68	43	—	—	—	—	—
2014–15	Ogre/Sāga97	LAT	6	5	5	10	12	—	—	—	—	—
2014–15	HK Rīga	MHL	32	10	18	28	49	3	1	0	1	2
2015–16	Rouyn–Noranda Huskies	QMJHL	59	24	43	67	42	20	7	10	17	12
2016–17	Rouyn–Noranda Huskies	QMJHL	47	21	28	49	44	6	0	2	2	10
2017–18	Orlando Solar Bears	ECHL	51	15	21	36	46	7	1	2	3	19
2017–18	Toronto Marlies	AHL	4	0	0	0	2	—	—	—	—	—
2018–19	Dinamo Rīga	KHL	42	5	8	13	22	—	—	—	—	—
2018–19	HK Liepāja	LAT	4	1	4	5	6	—	—	—	—	—
2019–20	Jukurit	Liiga	39	7	8	15	16	—	—	—	—	—
2020–21	Dinamo Rīga	KHL	52	10	14	24	49	—	—	—	—	—
2021–22	HC Plzeň	ELH	49	10	20	30	34	5	0	2	2	4
2022–23	Motor České Budějovice	ELH	52	7	14	21	16	—	—	—	—	—
2023–24	Skellefteå AIK	SHL	45	2	1	3	20	16	2	1	3	10
2024–25	Skellefteå AIK	SHL	52	7	5	12	26	10	1	3	4	6
2025–26	HC Sparta Praha	ELH	50	7	8	15	30	19	2	2	4	6
KHL totals			94	15	22	37	71	—	—	—	—	—
Liiga totals			39	7	8	15	16	—	—	—	—	—
ELH totals			151	24	42	66	80	24	2	4	6	10
SHL totals			97	9	6	15	46	26	3	4	7	16

=== International ===
Year	Team	Event	Result	GP	G	A	Pts	PIM
2014	Latvia	U18 D1A	11th	5	0	2	2	16
2015	Latvia	WJC D1A	13th	5	2	2	4	2
2015	Latvia	U18	9th	6	3	6	9	10
2016	Latvia	WJC D1A	11th	5	1	3	4	4
2016	Latvia	OGQ	DNQ	3	1	0	1	0
2017	Latvia	WJC	10th	6	1	2	3	12
2019	Latvia	WC	10th	7	0	0	0	0
2021	Latvia	WC	11th	6	2	0	2	0
2021	Latvia	OGQ	Q	1	0	0	0	0
2022	Latvia	OG	11th	4	0	0	0	0
2022	Latvia	WC	10th	7	0	4	4	6
2023	Latvia	WC	3rd place, bronze medalist(s)	10	2	3	5	27
2024	Latvia	WC	9th	7	0	4	4	10
2024	Latvia	OGQ	Q	3	1	2	3	0
2025	Latvia	WC	10th	7	2	0	2	2
2026	Latvia	OG	10th	4	0	0	0	2
2026	Latvia	WC	6th	8	2	2	4	4
Junior totals				27	7	15	22	44
Senior totals				67	10	15	25	51
