= Viktors Ignatjevs =

Latvian ice hockey player

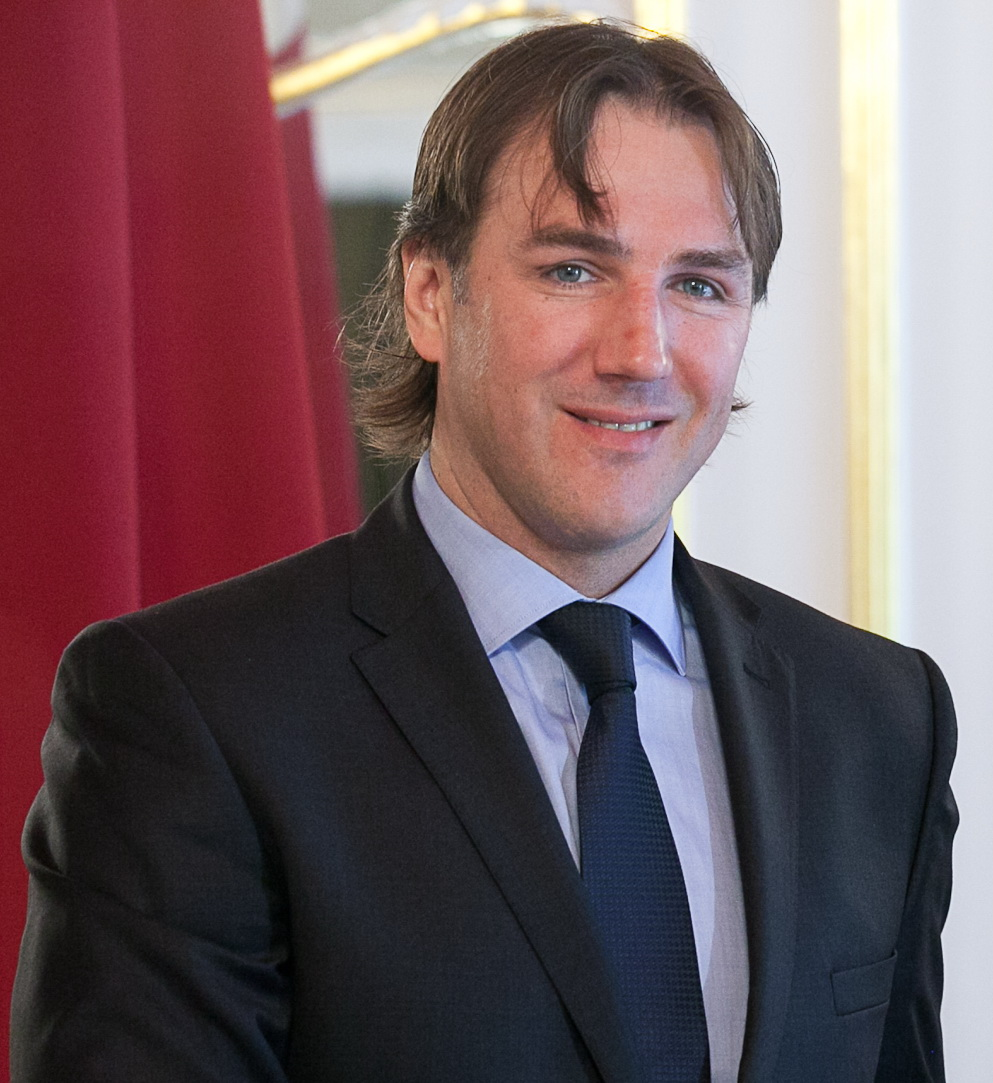
- Born: April 26, 1970 (age 55) Riga, Latvian SSR, Soviet Union
- Height: 6 ft 3 in (191 cm)
- Weight: 213 lb (97 kg; 15 st 3 lb)
- Position: Defence
- Shot: Left
- Played for: Pittsburgh Penguins; HYS The Hague; Dinamo Riga; Nürnberg Ice Tigers; Leksands IF; Severstal Cherepovets; Spartak Moskva; EHC Linz; Vienna Capitals; HC Bolzano; HK Ozolnieki/Monarhs
- National team: Latvia
- NHL draft: 243rd overall, 1992; San Jose Sharks
- Playing career: 1989–2010

Viktors Ignatjevs (born April 26, 1970, in Riga, Soviet Union) is a Latvian former ice hockey player who played 11 games in the National Hockey League with the Pittsburgh Penguins. Currently Ignatjevs works as the head coach of Kunlun Red Star of the Kontinental Hockey League. He has a wife Lena and three daughters: Lisa, Kristina, and Sonja. Lisa and Kristina were born in the United States.

== Career statistics ==
=== Regular season and playoffs ===
			Regular season					Playoffs
Season	Team	League	GP	G	A	Pts	PIM	GP	G	A	Pts	PIM
1986–87	RASMS Riga	URS.3	1	0	0	0	0	—	—	—	—	—
1987–88	RASMS Riga	URS.3	17	0	2	2	10	—	—	—	—	—
1988–89	RASMS-Energo Riga	URS.3	36	2	2	4	44	—	—	—	—	—
1989–90	Dinamo Riga	Soviet	40	0	0	0	26	—	—	—	—	—
1989–90	RASMS-Energo Riga	URS.3	10	1	1	2	8	—	—	—	—	—
1990–91	Dinamo Riga	Soviet	10	0	0	0	2	—	—	—	—	—
1990–91	RASMS Riga	URS.3	38	3	4	7	44	—	—	—	—	—
1991–92	Stars Riga	CIS	22	4	5	9	22	—	—	—	—	—
1992–93	Kansas City Blades	IHL	64	5	16	21	68	4	1	2	3	24
1993–94	Kansas City Blades	IHL	67	1	24	25	123	—	—	—	—	—
1994–95	Denver Grizzlies	IHL	23	2	11	13	4	17	3	8	11	8
1994–95	Oklahoma City Blazers	CHL	47	11	35	46	66	—	—	—	—	—
1995–96	Utah Grizzlies	IHL	73	9	29	38	67	21	3	8	11	22
1996–97	Long Beach Ice Dogs	IHL	82	16	53	69	112	16	3	4	7	26
1997–98	Long Beach Ice Dogs	IHL	71	12	33	45	102	17	3	11	14	16
1998–99	Pittsburgh Penguins	NHL	11	0	1	1	6	1	0	0	0	2
1999–2000	Nürnberg Ice Tigers	DEL	49	3	14	17	46	11	0	1	1	10
2000–01	Leksands IF	SEL	39	0	1	1	32	8	0	1	1	10
2001–02	Severstal Cherepovets	RSL	27	0	3	3	34	1	0	0	0	0
2002–03	Spartak Moskva	RSL	30	1	5	6	52	—	—	—	—	—
2002–03	Molot-Prikamie Perm	RSL	6	0	0	0	8	—	—	—	—	—
2003–04	Spartak Moskva	RUS.2	56	5	21	26	56	12	0	5	5	14
2004–05	EHC Linz	EBEL	39	8	11	19	24	—	—	—	—	—
2005–06	EHC Linz	EBEL	42	8	24	32	58	—	—	—	—	—
2006–07	EHC Linz	EBEL	51	10	20	30	130	3	0	1	1	6
2007–08	EHC Linz	EBEL	46	6	13	19	50	11	1	7	8	8
2008–09	Vienna Capitals	EBEL	30	1	8	9	86	—	—	—	—	—
2008–09	HC Bolzano	ITA	15	3	5	8	14	8	3	3	6	6
2009–10	HYS The Hague	NED	45	14	32	46	76	5	1	0	1	10
2010–11	HK Ozolnieki/Monarhs	LAT	8	2	9	11	8	—	—	—	—	—
2011–12	HK Ozolnieki/Monarhs	LAT	6	2	6	8	8	5	0	4	4	4
2012–13	HK Ozolnieki/Monarhs	LAT	4	0	1	1	0	2	0	3	3	0
IHL totals			380	45	166	211	476	75	13	33	46	96
NHL totals			11	0	1	1	6	1	0	0	0	2
EBEL totals			208	33	76	109	348	14	1	8	9	14

=== International ===
Year	Team	Event	GP	G	A	Pts	PIM
2000	Latvia	WC	7	0	0	0	18
2001	Latvia	OGQ	3	3	1	4	0
2001	Latvia	WC	6	0	1	1	2
2002	Latvia	OG	4	0	0	0	4
2002	Latvia	WC	6	0	0	0	4
2004	Latvia	WC	6	1	0	1	4
2005	Latvia	OGQ	3	0	0	0	6
2005	Latvia	WC	6	0	2	2	10
Senior totals			41	4	4	8	48
