= Ralfs Grīnbergs =

Latvian ice hockey player

- Born: 10 November 1995 (age 29); Riga, Latvia
- Height: 189 cm (6 ft 2 in)
- Weight: 83 kg (183 lb; 13 st 1 lb)
- Position: Defence
- Shot: Left
- Played for: Dinamo Riga; Peoria Rivermen; Mississippi RiverKings; HK Riga; HK Liepāja; Åker/Strängnäs HC; Indy Fuel
- Playing career: 2014–2022

Ralfs Grīnbergs (born 10 November 1995) is a Latvian former ice hockey player who played for the HK Rīga of the MHL.

== Playing career ==
Grīnbergs began his hockey career playing in minor and junior Latvian hockey leagues. In 2013/2014 season he joined the HK Rīga Dinamo Rīga minor league affiliate. He made his KHL debut on 15 October in defeat against Jokerit.

=== International ===
Grīnbergs participated at the 2014 World Junior Ice Hockey Championships as a member of the Latvia men's national junior ice hockey team.
