= Aigars Cipruss =

Latvian professional ice hockey player

- Born: 12 January 1972 (age 54) Riga, Latvian SSR, Soviet Union
- Height: 5 ft 10 in (178 cm)
- Weight: 176 lb (80 kg; 12 st 8 lb)
- Position: Centre
- Shot: Left
- LHL team: HK Ozolnieki/Monarhs
- National team: Latvia
- Playing career: 1990–2013

Aigars Cipruss (born 12 January 1972) is a Latvian professional ice hockey player currently playing for HK Ozolnieki/Monarhs hockey club. Until then he played for Dinamo Riga of the Kontinental Hockey League, and served as manager for this team and was coach in its farm club.

== Playing career ==
A veteran centre, Cipruss last season played in Italy, regularly represented Latvia internationally till 2006th as well. Although he has played in the North American leagues, he has never been drafted by an NHL team.

Cipruss scored first goal in renewed Latvian national ice hockey team game on 26th second at 7 September 1992 against Lithuania national ice hockey team. After 2006 Winter Olympics announced that he retires from Latvia national team. He returned in Latvian national team in 2009.

== Career statistics ==
=== Regular season and playoffs ===
			Regular season					Playoffs
Season	Team	League	GP	G	A	Pts	PIM	GP	G	A	Pts	PIM
1989–90	RASMS–Energo Rīga	URS.3	2	1	1	2	0	—	—	—	—	—
1990–91	Dinamo Rīga	URS	3	0	0	0	2	—	—	—	—	—
1990–91	RASMS Rīga	URS.3	43	9	12	21	6	—	—	—	—	—
1991–92	Stars Rīga	CIS	21	0	2	2	6	—	—	—	—	—
1991–92	RASMS Rīga	CIS.3	6	2	4	6	4	—	—	—	—	—
1992–93	Pārdaugava Rīga	RUS	42	15	9	24	14	2	1	1	2	0
1992–93	Pārdaugava Rīga	LAT	4	2	3	5	0	—	—	—	—	—
1993–94	Pārdaugava Rīga	RUS	40	17	12	29	6	2	0	2	2	4
1994–95	Atlanta Knights	IHL	11	3	7	10	2	—	—	—	—	—
1994–95	Nashville Knights	ECHL	53	26	43	69	24	—	—	—	—	—
1995–96	Atlanta Knights	IHL	2	0	2	2	0	—	—	—	—	—
1995–96	Nashville Knights	ECHL	49	26	50	76	57	—	—	—	—	—
1995–96	Providence Bruins	AHL	15	3	3	6	6	—	—	—	—	—
1996–97	Grand Rapids Griffins	IHL	1	0	1	1	0	—	—	—	—	—
1996–97	Québec Rafales	IHL	41	7	24	31	2	—	—	—	—	—
1996–97	Muskegon Fury	CoHL	23	13	19	32	13	—	—	—	—	—
1997–98	Lukko	SM-l	48	12	23	35	18	—	—	—	—	—
1998–99	Lukko	SM-l	54	9	26	35	28	—	—	—	—	—
1999–2000	Pelicans	SM-l	53	13	17	30	12	—	—	—	—	—
2000–01	Jokerit	SM-l	56	18	19	37	18	5	1	1	2	0
2001–02	HIFK	SM-l	51	12	17	29	12	—	—	—	—	—
2002–03	SaiPa	SM-l	52	10	12	22	16	—	—	—	—	—
2003–04	Spartak Moscow	RUS.2	60	16	36	52	16	12	4	4	8	2
2004–05	Spartak Moscow	RSL	56	5	9	14	12	—	—	—	—	—
2004–05	Spartak–2 Moscow	RUS.3	1	0	0	0	0	—	—	—	—	—
2005–06	HK Rīga 2000	BLR	44	10	16	26	18	7	0	2	2	2
2006–07	DHK Latgale	LAT	3	3	0	3	0	—	—	—	—	—
2005–06	HC Asiago	ITA	32	10	14	24	8	—	—	—	—	—
2007–08	EfB Ishockey	DEN	34	7	19	26	20	—	—	—	—	—
2008–09	Dinamo Rīga	KHL	32	1	2	3	14	3	0	0	0	2
2008–09	HK Rīga 2000	BLR	18	5	8	13	6	—	—	—	—	—
2009–10	HK Ozolnieki/Monarhs	LAT	6	5	4	9	2	—	—	—	—	—
2010–11	HK Ozolnieki/Monarhs	LAT	10	5	9	14	2	—	—	—	—	—
2011–12	HK Ozolnieki/Monarhs	LAT	5	1	3	4	0	—	—	—	—	—
2012–13	HK Ozolnieki/Monarhs	LAT	14	8	10	18	0	2	1	1	2	0
ECHL totals			102	52	93	145	81	—	—	—	—	—
SM-l totals			314	74	114	188	104	5	1	1	2	0

=== International ===
Year	Team	Event	GP	G	A	Pts	PIM
1993	Latvia	WC C	7	7	9	16	0
1993	Latvia	OGQ	4	0	3	3	2
1994	Latvia	WC B	6	1	5	6	2
1996	Latvia	OGQ	4	3	3	6
1997	Latvia	WC	8	1	3	4	4
1998	Latvia	WC	6	1	1	2	0
1999	Latvia	WC	6	5	1	6	4
1999	Latvia	WC Q	3	0	1	1	0
2000	Latvia	WC	3	0	0	0	0
2001	Latvia	OGQ	3	1	0	1	0
2001	Latvia	WC	6	0	2	2	0
2002	Latvia	OG	4	1	2	3	0
2002	Latvia	WC	6	1	2	3	0
2003	Latvia	WC	6	0	2	2	0
2004	Latvia	WC	7	0	2	2	0
2005	Latvia	WC	6	0	1	1	0
2006	Latvia	OG	5	2	1	3	6
2009	Latvia	OGQ	3	0	2	2	2
2009	Latvia	WC	7	0	0	0	4
Senior totals			100	23	40	63	24
