= Ralfs Freibergs =

Latvian ice hockey player (born 1991)

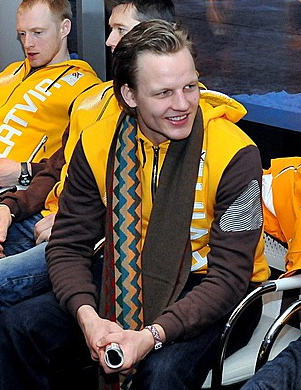
- Born: 17 May 1991 (age 35) Riga, Latvia
- Height: 5 ft 11 in (180 cm)
- Weight: 192 lb (87 kg; 13 st 10 lb)
- Position: Defence
- Shoots: Left
- ELH team Former teams: HC Olomouc; Dinamo Riga; PSG Berani Zlín; HC Kometa Brno; HC Oceláři Třinec; Iserlohn Roosters; HC Litvínov; Mountfield HK; HC Vitkovice
- National team: Latvia
- NHL draft: Undrafted
- Playing career: 2013–present

Ralfs Freibergs (born 17 May 1991) is a Latvian professional ice hockey player who is a defenceman for HC Olomouc of the Czech Extraliga (ELH).

== Playing career ==
After first playing professionally in his native Latvia, Freibergs moved to North America as a junior and played college ice hockey for Bowling Green State University.

On 8 August 2014, Freibergs signed his first North American professional contract in agreeing to a one-year American Hockey League deal with the St. John's IceCaps. Freibergs appeared in 5 games with the IceCaps. However, he was reassigned to ECHL affiliate, the Ontario Reign for the majority of the campaign.

Leading into the 2015–16 season, Freibergs accepted an invitation to the Grand Rapids Griffins training camp on 28 September 2015. He was reassigned and signed an ECHL contract with affiliate Toledo Walleye on 6 October 2015.

On 15 July 2016, Freibergs returned to his native Latvia as a free agent from North America, signing a contract with Dinamo Riga of the Kontinental Hockey League (KHL).

== International play ==
Medal record

Representing Latvia

Ice hockey

World Championships
Bronze medal – third place	2023 Finland/Latvia	

Freibergs competed in the 2014 Winter Olympics, being the only active college player to compete in the men's tournament. His first appearance was in the third game when he logged 4:56 of ice time. Freibergs also competed in the elimination round games against Switzerland and Canada.

The International Olympic Committee (IOC) announced on 25 April 2014, that Freibergs was excluded from the 2014 Winter Olympics after failing doping test.

He represented Latvia at the 2023 IIHF World Championship where he recorded one goal and three assists and won a bronze medal, Latvia's first ever IIHF World Championship medal.

== Career statistics ==
=== Regular season and playoffs ===
			Regular season					Playoffs
Season	Team	League	GP	G	A	Pts	PIM	GP	G	A	Pts	PIM
2006–07	Prizma/Rīga 86	LAT U18		1	4	5	16	—	—	—	—	—
2007–08	Prizma/Rīga 86	LAT U18	22	4	11	15	40	—	—	—	—	—
2008–09	HS Rīga/Prizma–Hanza	LAT	23	1	7	8	24	—	—	—	—	—
2009–10	Texas Tornado	NAHL	26	1	17	18	36	5	0	2	2	4
2010–11	Texas Tornado	NAHL	53	7	48	55	45	4	0	3	3	8
2011–12	Lincoln Stars	USHL	60	8	35	43	40	8	0	2	2	6
2012–13	Bowling Green State University	CCHA	8	1	6	7	4	—	—	—	—	—
2013–14	Bowling Green State University	WCHA	37	3	19	22	51	—	—	—	—	—
2014–15	St. John's IceCaps	AHL	5	0	2	2	2	—	—	—	—	—
2014–15	Ontario Reign	ECHL	52	3	14	17	16	6	0	0	0	0
2015–16	Toledo Walleye	ECHL	61	2	27	29	61	—	—	—	—	—
2016–17	Dinamo Rīga	KHL	38	1	5	6	30	—	—	—	—	—
2017–18	Aukro Berani Zlína	ELH	52	3	23	26	42	4	0	4	4	6
2018–19	PSG Berani Zlín	ELH	52	5	19	24	38	5	1	0	1	8
2019–20	PSG Berani Zlín	ELH	52	3	20	23	32	2	0	0	0	0
2020–21	HC Kometa Brno	ELH	29	2	6	8	12	—	—	—	—	—
2020–21	HC Oceláři Třinec	ELH	15	0	6	6	6	16	3	6	9	2
2021–22	Dinamo Rīga	KHL	34	0	2	2	37	—	—	—	—	—
2021–22	Iserlohn Roosters	DEL	10	0	2	2	0	—	—	—	—	—
2022–23	HC Litvínov	ELH	43	2	12	14	53	3	0	0	0	0
2023–24	Mountfield HK	ELH	52	1	8	9	22	8	2	0	2	8
2024–25	Mountfield HK	ELH	52	3	10	13	36	12	0	0	0	10
KHL totals			72	1	7	8	67	—	—	—	—	—
ELH totals			347	19	104	123	241	50	6	10	16	34
DEL totals			10	0	2	2	0	—	—	—	—	—

=== International ===
Year	Team	Event	GP	G	A	Pts	PIM
2008	Latvia	U18 D1	5	0	1	1	0
2009	Latvia	WJC	6	1	1	2	10
2009	Latvia	U18 D1	5	0	1	1	8
2010	Latvia	WJC	6	0	3	3	12
2011	Latvia	WJC D1	5	1	2	3	6
2013	Latvia	WC	7	0	1	1	4
2014	Latvia	OG	5	0	1	1	0
2016	Latvia	WC	6	0	0	0	6
2016	Latvia	OGQ	3	0	0	0	0
2017	Latvia	WC	7	0	0	0	0
2018	Latvia	WC	8	0	1	1	2
2019	Latvia	WC	6	0	3	3	27
2021	Latvia	WC	7	0	3	3	0
2021	Latvia	OGQ	3	0	0	0	2
2022	Latvia	OG	4	0	0	0	2
2023	Latvia	WC	10	1	3	4	8
2024	Latvia	WC	7	1	1	2	6
2024	Latvia	OGQ	3	0	1	1	2
2025	Latvia	WC	7	0	1	1	4
2026	Latvia	OG	2	0	0	0	0
2026	Latvia	WC	8	0	0	0	2
Junior totals			27	2	8	10	36
Senior totals			93	2	15	17	65
