= HK Kurbads =

Latvian ice hockey club

- City: Riga, Latvia
- League: OHL
- Founded: 1996
- Home arena: Kurbads Ledus Halle
- Colours: Blue, yellow, white
- Owner(s): Andis Pikans
- Head coach: Aleksandrs Macijevskis
- Captain: Toms Bluks
- Website: www.hkkurbads.lv

Championships
- Regular season titles: 1 (2013–14)
- Latvian Hockey Higher League: 2 (2016–17, 2017-18)

HK Kurbads is a professional ice hockey team based in Riga, Latvia. It is a member of the Latvian Hockey Higher League and also compete for the Latvian Cup, winning Latvian Hockey League in 2016–17 and 2017–18 season. The team played its home games at Vidzemes Ledus Halle in Ogre until 2017 when the new arena was built in Rumbula, Riga.

== History ==
HK Kurbads was founded by Andis Pikans, Janis Siraks and Gints Zviedritis in 1996 as an amateur team and played in various amateur championships until 2013 when they joined the Latvian Hockey Higher League. The team started playing its home games at Ogre.

In their debut season, as several stronger players joined the team they won the regular season, yet lost in the play-off final to HK Prizma.

For the 2014-15 season, the team was joined by players like Rodrigo Laviņš and Aleksandrs Macijevskis and despite finishing only 3rd in the regular season, they reached the finals again, just to lose to HK Mogo in the series 2 to 4.

In 2016, the team reached the finals for the third time and this time lost to HK Liepāja in the series 3 to 4. That was the first time in history for a Latvian Hockey League final requiring all 7 games to decide the winner. As for the 2015–16 Latvian Cup, which was resurrected, Kurbads managed to reach the finals, where they lost to HK Mogo.

In 2017, Kurbads reached the finals for the 4th time and this time, despite being down 0 to 3 games in the series, managed to come back and win against HK Mogo, therefore winning their first championship and qualifying for next season's IIHF Continental Cup. In the Latvian Cup, they reached the finals and lost to HK Mogo for the second time 2:3 OT.

In next season they debuted in IIHF Continental Cup by winning all 3 games in Group B at home, but falling short in next round by narrowly losing, in what was the deciding game, to the Sheffield Steelers with a score of 2–4 and thus finishing 3rd in group and failing to advance. In Latvian Cup they reached finals again, yet lost once again in a thrilling game to HK Mogo 2:3 OT. In 2018, despite finishing the regular season in 3rd place, they managed to sweep the finals against HK Zemgale/JLSS to win the league title for the second year in a row.

== Rivalry with HK Mogo ==
As both teams being based in Riga and having frequently played against each other in several league and cup finals, it has started a small rivalry between the two, and therefore even the regular season meetings carry some increased significance to both teams.

== Season-by-season results ==
Season	GP	W	OTW	OTL	L	GF	GA	PTS	Finish	Playoff
2013–14 Latvian Hockey League	30	19	3	5	3	172	90	68	1st	Lost in final 2–4 (HK Prizma)
2014–15 Latvian Hockey League	30	20	1	2	7	167	81	64	3rd	Lost in final 2–4 (HK Mogo)
2015–16 Latvian Hockey League	30	18	4	3	5	162	74	64	3rd	Lost in final 3–4 (HK Liepāja)
2016–17 Latvian Hockey League	30	19	3	1	7	144	83	64	2nd	Won in final 4–3 (HK Mogo)
2017–18 Latvian Hockey League	30	17	2	4	7	131	75	59	3rd	Won in final 4–0 (HK Zemgale/JLSS)

=== Tournaments ===
- 2015–16 Latvian Cup – Lost to HK Mogo 3–4 in the final.
- 2016–17 Latvian Cup – Lost to HK Mogo 2–3 in the final.
- 2017–18 Latvian Cup – Lost to HK Mogo 2–3 OT in the final.
- 2017–18 IIHF Continental Cup – 3rd in Group D of the Third Round. Failed to advance.
- 2018–19 IIHF Continental Cup – 3rd in Group D of the Third Round. Failed to advance.

== Players and personnel ==
=== Current roster ===
Season 2017/2018

==== Goalies ====
- 30 Latvia Uldis Calpa
- 35 Latvia Nils Grinfogels
- 31 Latvia Guntars Reiss

==== Defense ====
- 12 Latvia Toms Bluks (C)
- 33 Latvia Aleksandrs Galkins
- 22 Latvia Mārtiņš Gipters
- 44 Latvia Hārdijs Parādnieks
- 77 Latvia Mārtiņš Porejs
- 14 Latvia Jēkabs Rēdlihs
- 5 Latvia Arturs Sorokins
- 10 Latvia Renars Valters (A)

==== Forwards ====
- 8 Latvia Edgars Brancis
- 47 Latvia Mārtiņš Cipulis
- 94 Latvia Gatis Gricinskis
- 18 Latvia Toms Hartmanis (A)
- 38 Latvia Martins Lavrovs
- 21 Latvia Arturs Logunovs
- 91 Latvia Rihards Remins
- 81 Latvia Deivids Sarkanis
- 13 Latvia Jānis Sprukts
- 6 Latvia Juris Štāls
- 7 Latvia Jānis Straupe
- 9 Latvia Dāvis Straupe
- 95 Latvia Juris Upītis
- 71 Latvia Toms Zeltiņš
- 29 Latvia Mārcis Zembergs
- 19 Latvia Sandis Zolmanis

== Notable players ==
- Guntis Galviņš (born 1986), Latvian ice-hockey player
- Sergejs Pečura (born 1987), Latvian ice hockey player
- Eliezer Sherbatov (born 1991), Canadian-Israeli ice hockey player

=== Head coaches ===
- Aigars Razgals, 2013
- Aigars Cipruss, 2014
- Gints Bisenieks, 2014–2015
- Pēteris Ostošovs, 2015–2016
- Rodrigo Laviņš, 2016-2017
- Pēteris Ostošovs, 2017
- Aleksandrs Macijevskis, 2017-present
