= HS Rīga =

Ice hockey team in Riga, Latvia

- City: Riga, Latvia
- League: OHL
- Founded: 1999
- Home arena: Hokeja halle Riga (capacity: 400)
- Colours: Dark blue, gold, light blue, white
- General manager: Renārs Freibergs
- Head coach: Oļegs Sorokins
- Affiliates: HS Rīga (JAHL)
- Website: hsriga.lv

Franchise history
- 2004–2014: SK Rīga 18
- 2015–present: HS Rīga

HS Rīga (Latvian: Hokeja skola Rīga, 'Hockey School Riga') is a professional ice hockey team based in Riga, Latvia. The team competes in the Latvian Hockey Higher League, the top tier of ice hockey in Latvia. The team plays its home games at the Hokeja halle Riga.

== History ==
Hockey School Rīga was founded on November 30, 1999, and is overseen in part by Riga City Council. As a hockey school, players undertake educational classes as well as hockey training; to this end HS Rīga has a boarding school attached to their training facility. As a result of this, the majority of the players on HS Rīga's Optibet Hockey League squad are teenagers. The schools first organised team competed under the name 'SK Rīga 18' in the 2004-05 LHL season, where they finished in last place. It wasn't until the 2008-09 season that the school fielded another side, this time finishing in 7th, whilst also competing in the Latvian U20's league, where they finished 3rd. Between 2009-2014 the school exclusively fielded teams in a range of U18 and U20 leagues, including the Belarusian U18 league, which they won in 2011.

Beginning in the 2015-16 season, under the moniker HS Rīga, the team again competed in Latvia's top tier, finishing 6th out of 7 teams. HS Rīga have competed in the Latvian top tier, now called the Optibet Hockey League for sponsorship reasons, ever since. Their best finish was 5th place in both 2017 & 2018, however, they have so far been unable to advance past the quarter-finals in post-season play.

In addition to their senior, HS Rīga also field a number of junior sides, from U9 up to U17, as well as a team in the JAHL, the Junior Development Hockey League.

== Roster ==
Updated February 5, 2021.

Goaltenders
Number		Player	Catches	Acquired	Place of Birth
40	(Latvia)	Olivers Bantersons	R	2019	-
1	(Latvia)	Kārlis Beķeris-Brīvkalns	L	2020	-
32	(Latvia)	Linards Lipskis	L	2019	-
30	(Latvia)	Kārlis Mežsargs	L	2020	Riga, Latvia
31	(Latvia)	Artūrs Šilovs	L	2017	Riga, Latvia

Defencemen
Number		Player	Shoots	Acquired	Place of Birth
26	(Latvia)	Roberts Andersons	L	2019	Jelgava, Latvia
4	(Latvia)	Niks Feņenko	L	2020	Riga, Latvia
7	(Latvia)	Edijs Freimanis	L	2020	Riga, Latvia
0	(Latvia)	Dāniels Gontars	L	2019	Ogre, Latvia
11	(Latvia)	Artjoms Kadņikovs	L	202019	Riga, Latvia
39	(Latvia)	Vladislavs Koniševs	L	2020	-
12	(Latvia)	Kārlis Krustiņš	L	2018	-
20	(Latvia)	Dāvis Orniņš	R	2019	-
29	(Latvia)	Gustavs Ozoliņš	L	2019	-
35	(Latvia)	Armands Edvards Pētersons	L	2020	-
0	(Latvia)	Patriks Seilis	L	2019	-
0	(Latvia)	Mārtiņš Špaks	L	2020	-

Forwards
Number		Player	Shoots	Position	Acquired	Place of Birth
28	(Latvia)	Artūrs Krišs Avotiņš	L	F	2019	Riga, Latvia
41	(Latvia)	Edvards Bergmanis	R	F	2019	-
19	(Latvia)	Matīss Bīriņš	R	F	2019	-
18	(Latvia)	Jano Vanderhulst	-	F	2017	-
6	(Latvia)	Rainers Dārziņš	L	F	2020	-
33	(Latvia)	Marks Ernests Kaniņš	L	F	2019	-
24	(Latvia)	Kristaps Kristiņš	L	F	2020	Ventspils, Latvia
36	(Latvia)	Daniels Mūrnieks	R	C	2020	-
23	(Latvia)	Roberts Petrovičs	L	F	2018	-
16	(Latvia)	Pēteris Purmalis	L	F	2019	-
13	(Latvia)	Anrī Ravinskis	L	F	2020	Riga, Latvia
17	(Latvia)	Berts Dāniels Rudzītis	L	F	2018	-
4	(Latvia)	Ģirts Silkalns	R	F	2019	-
34	(Latvia)	Rihards Simanovičs	L	F	2020	-
29	(Latvia)	Klāvs Veinbergs	L	F	2019	-
0	(Latvia)	Mārtiņš Šulcs	R	LW/RW	2019	Kuldīga, Latvia

== Season-by-season record ==
Note: GP = Games played, W = Wins, L = Losses, T = Ties, OTL = Overtime losses, Pts = Points, GF = Goals for, GA = Goals against, PIM = Penalties in minutes

Season	League	GP	W	L	T	OTW	OTL	Pts	GF	GA	Finish	Playoffs
2015–16	Latvian Hockey Higher League	30	4	24	—	0	2	14	59	164	6th	Quarter-final loss
2016–17	Latvian Hockey Higher League	30	11	16	—	0	3	36	131	36	5th	Quarter-final loss
2017–18	Optibet Hockey League	30	3	20	—	3	4	19	82	168	5th	Did not qualify
2018–19	Optibet Hockey League	36	12	18	—	4	2	46	84	127	6th	Did not qualify
2019–20	Optibet Hockey League	20	4	16	—	0	2	10	53	101	6th	Playoffs cancelled

== Team records ==
=== Career ===
These are the top five scorers in HS Rīga history.

Note: Pos = Position; GP = Games played; G = Goals; A = Assists; Pts = Points

Player	Pos	GP	G	A	Pts
Roberts Lipsbergs	F	63	95	85	190
Emīls Potāpovs	F	72	59	64	123
Ričards Kondrāts	F	54	37	74	111
Raimonds Vilkoits	F	27	30	47	77
Ņikita Jevpalovs	D	19	34	37	71

Penalty minutes: Ričards Briška, 128

=== Season ===
==== Regular season ====
- Most goals in a season: Roberts Lipsbergs, 60 (2010–11)
- Most assists in a season: Roberts Lipsbergs, 47 (2010–11)
- Most points in a season: Roberts Lipsbergs, 107 (2010–11)
- Most penalty minutes in a season: Aldis Popens, 119 (2007–08)

==== Playoffs ====
- Most goals in a playoff season: Oļegs Šišļaņņikovs, 3 (2016–17)
- Most assists in a playoff season: Oļegs Šišļaņņikovs, 3 (2016–17)
- Most points in a playoff season: Oļegs Šišļaņņikovs, 6 (2016–17)
- Most penalty minutes in a playoff season: Aleksejs Popovs, 22 (2015–16)

== Notable players ==
- Rihards Bukarts
- Miks Indrašis
- Roberts Lipsbergs
- Gints Meija
