= 2013–14 Latvian Hockey League season =

2013–14 Latvian Hockey League
- League: Latvian Hockey Higher League
- Sport: Ice hockey
- Number of teams: 6

Regular season
- Winners: HK Kurbads

Playoffs

Finals
- Champions: HS Prizma Riga
- Runners-up: HK Kurbads

Latvian Hockey League seasons
- ← 2012–13 2014–15 →

The 2013–14 Latvian Hockey League season was the 23rd season of the Latvian Hockey League, the top level of ice hockey in Latvia. Six teams participated in the league, and HS Prizma Riga won the championship and qualified for the 2014–15 IIHF Continental Cup.

== Regular season ==
	Club	GP	W	OTW	OTL	L	Goals	Pts
1.	HK Kurbads	30	19	3	5	3	172:90	68
2.	JLSS Zemgale	30	18	3	0	9	155:93	60
3.	HS Prizma Riga	30	17	2	1	10	135:95	56
4.	HK Ozolnieki/Monarhs	30	14	1	1	14	136:116	45
5.	HK Dinamo Juniors	30	10	2	3	15	102:100	37
6.	HK Daugavpils	30	1	0	1	28	48:254	4

== Playoffs ==
Quarter-finals
HK Kurbads	Bye
HK Ozolnieki/Monarhs	3
HK Dinamo Juniors	0
HS Prizma Riga	3
HK Daugavpils	0
JLSS Zemgale	Bye

Semi-finals
HK Kurbads	3
HK Ozolnieki/Monarhs	2
HS Prizma Riga	3
JLSS Zemgale	1

Final
HK Kurbads	2
HS Prizma Riga	4
