= HK Prizma Riga =

Ice hockey team in Riga, Latvia

HK Prizma Rīga/IHS
- City: Riga, Latvia
- League: OHL
- Founded: 1997
- Home arena: Volvo Sports Centre (capacity: 2000)
- Colours: Red, dark blue, white
- Owner: SIA Prizma
- General manager: Juris Jegorovs
- Head coach: Ēriks Miļuns
- Website: hkprizma.lv

Franchise history
- 1998–2002: LB Prizma Rīga
- 2002–2004: HK Prizma Rīga
- 2003–2004: Prizma/Riga 86
- 2008–2009: HS Riga/Prizma-Hanza
- 2010–2017: HK Prizma Rīga
- 2017–2021: HK Prizma/IHS
- 2021–present: HK Prizma Rīga

Championships
- Playoff championships: 1 (2014)

HK Prizma Riga/IHS is a professional ice hockey team in Riga, Latvia. The team competes in the Latvian Hockey Higher League, the top tier of ice hockey in Latvia. The team plays its home games at the Volvo Sports Centre. HK Prizma previously played in both the Eastern European Hockey League and the MHL B.

== History ==
The team was founded in 1997 by logistics company SIA Prizma, originally operating under the name LB/Prizma Rīga having partnered up with Latvijas Bērzs, and began play in the Latvian Hockey Higher League during the 1998–99 season. They would have an abject debut season losing every one of their games and finishing the season in last place. The following season saw the team continue to struggle, as they lost all but one of their games, and had one tie; they again finished at the foot of the table. In the off-season, they separated from Latvijas Bērzs and rebranded as HK Prizma. Playing under a new name saw the team's fortunes improve; they finished the 2000-01 season in 4th place after winning 8 games. The 2001-02 season saw Prizma field a team in both the Latvian Hockey League and Division B of the Eastern European Hockey League, a trans-national league made up of teams from Belarus, Latvia, Lithuania and Ukraine amongst others. Prizma achieved mid-table positions in both leagues, and the following season would return to the EEHL, however, the team struggled, winning only 3 of their 18 games. During this season, Prizma did not compete in the LHL, however, they did field a team in the Pirma Liga, the 2nd tier of the sport in the country, in which they finished 3rd.

Prizma returned solely to the LHL for the 2003-04 under the name of Prizma/Riga 86, and had a good season, finishing 3rd in Group B before losing in the play-off finals. During this season, future NHL and KHL player Kaspars Daugaviņš played for the team. After the culmination of the season, Prizma pulled out of organised hockey, save for a single season in the LHL as HS Rīga/Prizma-Hanza in 2008, until returning to the LHL for the 2010–11 season. During this time, the team relocated to the Volvo Sports Centre which had been constructed by team owners SIA Prizma in 2005. HK Prizma's return to the LHL was a tepid affair, finishing 7th out of nine teams, before losing in the play-off quarter-finals. The following season, Prizma again fielded teams in two leagues; they remained in the LHL but also competed in the MHL B, a junior league based predominately in Russia. However, they continue to would struggle in both leagues, regularly finishing near the bottom of the table for the next two seasons. The 2013–14 season however was one of mixed success. Whilst the MHL squad finished dead last out of 32 teams, the LHL side would find success by finishing 3rd in the regular season, before going on to win their first Latvian Championship, beating HK Kurbads in the play-off finals. The season marked the last that Prizma would field a team in the MHL B; moving forward the team focused solely on the LHL.

The 2014–15 season saw Prizma defending their championship, however, they were unable to retain it having finished 4th in the regular season, before losing in the opening round of the play-offs to HK Zemgale/JLSS. They finished 5th the following season, and subsequently made it to the Bronze-medal game which they ultimately lost to HK Mogo. Prizma remained towards to the foot of the table during the 2016–17 season, winning 10 of their 30 games, finishing 6th out of 7 teams before ultimately losing in the opening round of the play-offs. The team would struggle during the following season in the newly renamed Optibet Hockey League too, finishing dead last having only won 4 games and failing to qualify for the play-offs. In the pursuing off-season, Prizma signed former Olympian and KHL player Armands Bērziņš, who had previously played for the team as a junior. With Bērziņš on board the team's fortunes improved, as they finished 4th out of 7 teams in the 2018-19 season however, they lost in the opening round of the play-offs. The team would regress during the 2019-20 season, finishing in 7th place besting only HS Rīga before the play-offs were cancelled due to COVID-19 pandemic.

In 2005 SIA Prizma founded the 'Pārdaugava' sports school, which focuses on ice hockey and figure skating. The year after its establishment, Pārdaugava was the first private sports education provider in Latvia to receive accreditation from the Latvian Ministry of Education and Science. During the 2019 off-season the team changed its name to HK Prizma/IHS in order to highlight its new partnership with the International Hockey School also based out of the Volvo Sports Centre.

As a result of winning the Latvian Championship in 2014, Prizma qualified for the IIHF Continental Cup in 2015. They were drawn in Group C alongside KH Sanok of Poland, Romanian champions Corona Brașov and Hungarian side Dunaújvárosi Acélbikák. Prizma beat Sanok, but lost to both Corona Brașov and Dunaújvárosi; as a result they finished last in the group based on goal difference and did not progress to the next round. Since 2021, the name of the team is HK Prizma Rīga.

== Roster ==
Updated February 22, 2021.

Goaltenders
Number		Player	Catches	Acquired	Place of Birth
32	(Latvia)	Jāzeps Lukjanskis	L	2020	-
1	(Russia)	Kirill Merkulov	L	2020	-
71	(Latvia)	Rihards Norvaišs	L	2019	-
84	(Latvia)	Reinis Petkus	L	2020	Aizpute, Latvia
32	(Latvia)	Niklāvs Rauza	L	2019	Riga, Latvia

Defencemen
Number		Player	Shoots	Acquired	Place of Birth
69	(Latvia)	Artūrs Apfelbaums	L	2016	Riga, Latvia
96	(Latvia)	Rihards Dombrovskis	R	2019	-
5	(Russia)	Mykyta Gladky	L	2016	-
23	(Russia)	Vadim Kolpakov	L	2020	Chelyabinsk, Russia
3	(Latvia)	Ņikita Kuprijanovs	L	2018	Riga, Latvia
52	(Latvia)	Rihards Ķuzis	L	2020	-
98	(Latvia)	Iļja Lankovskis	L	2019	-
2	(Ukraine)	Ivan Mykoliuk	R	2020	Donetsk, Ukraine
59	(Latvia)	Rūdolfs Romans	L	2019	Riga, Latvia
47	(Latvia)	Jānis Šmits	L	2020	Riga, Latvia
15	(Latvia)	Artūrs Treimanis	L	2018	-
19	(Latvia)	Iļja Žuļevs	L	2018	-
61	(Latvia)	Haralds Jirgens	L	2020	Riga, Latvia

Forwards
Number		Player	Shoots	Position	Acquired	Place of Birth
77	(Latvia)	Valters Apfelbaums	L	W	2015	Riga, Latvia
21	(Latvia)	Armands Bērziņš (A)	L	C	2018	Riga, Latvia
41	(Russia)	Boriss Bessemertnyy	L	F	2018	Saint Petersburg, Russia
29	(Belarus)	Aleksey Borodich	L	LW/RW	2020	Minsk, Belarus
94	(Latvia)	Renārs Cipruss	R	RW	2020	-
27	(Latvia)	Gusts Jegorovs	L	F	2019	-
55	(Latvia)	Raivis Kurnigins	L	W	2020	Aizkraukle, Latvia
97	(Latvia)	Ēriks Ozollapa	L	RW/LW	2019	Riga, Latvia
29	(Latvia)	Everts Ozols	R	C	2019	-
18	(Latvia)	Ričards Puriņš	L	C	2020	Riga, Latvia
89	(Latvia)	Kristaps Riekstiņš	R	F	2015	-
28	(Latvia)	Ņikita Šaburovs	R	R	2018	Riga, Latvia
74	(Latvia)	Deivids Šeflands	L	F	2020	-
33	(Latvia)	Jēkabs Siliņš	L	F	2019	-
13	(Latvia)	Andrejs Smirnovs	L	F	2018	Riga, Latvia
62	(Latvia)	Dāvis Straupe	R	RW/C	2020	Riga, Latvia
12	(Latvia)	Kārlis Tiltiņš	R	F	2017	-
19	(Belarus)	Yegor Tozik	L	F	2020	-
8	(Latvia)	Juris Upītis	R	LW/C	2020	Riga, Latvia
88	(Latvia)	Ēriks Žohovs	L	C	2020	Riga, Latvia
61	(Latvia)	Haralds Jirgens	L	F	2020	Riga, Latvia
17	(Latvia)	Kristers Bormanis	R	W/C	2020	Jelgava, Latvia
0	(Latvia)	Dmitrijs Komarņickis	L	F	2020	-
28	(Latvia)	Rihards Krastiņš	R	F	2020	-
23	(Latvia)	Martins Lavrovs	L	LW/RW	2020	Tukums, Latvia
98	(Latvia)	Roberts Priževoits	L	F	2020	Riga, Latvia
25	(Latvia)	Māris Jānis Graudiņš	L	F	2020	Jūrmala, Latvia

== Season-by-season record ==
Note: GP = Games played, W = Wins, L = Losses, T = Ties, OTL = Overtime losses, Pts = Points, GF = Goals for, GA = Goals against, PIM = Penalties in minutes

Season	League	GP	W	L	T	OTW	OTL	Pts	GF	GA	Finish	Playoffs
2015–16	Latvian Hockey Higher League	30	12	16	—	1	1	39	110	101	5th	Bronze medal game loss
2016–17	Latvian Hockey Higher League	30	8	19	—	2	1	29	131	152	6th	Quarter-final loss
2017–18	Optibet Hockey League	30	3	22	—	1	4	15	55	141	6th	Did not qualify
2018–19	Optibet Hockey League	35	17	12	—	2	4	59	113	59	4th	Semi-final loss
2019–20	Optibet Hockey League	35	6	26	—	1	2	16	95	194	7th	Playoffs cancelled

== Honours ==
Latvian Championships:

- 2014

== Team records ==
=== Career ===
These are the top five scorers in HK Prizma history.

Note: Pos = Position; GP = Games played; G = Goals; A = Assists; Pts = Points

Player	Pos	GP	G	A	Pts
Kristaps Riekstiņš	F	286	92	96	188
Sandis Grīnbergs	F	238	59	78	137
Victor Lobachev	F	118	51	69	120
Miķelis Freimanis	D	225	41	74	115
Deniss Baskatovs	F	128	31	78	109

Penalty minutes: Daniels Riekstiņš, 325

=== Season ===
==== Regular season ====
- Most goals in a season: Vitālijs Hvorostiņins, 22 (2015-16)
- Most assists in a season: Rihards Malinovskis, 31 (2008-09)
- Most points in a season: Rihards Malinovskis, 47 (2008-09)
- Most penalty minutes in a season: Pavel Vasilyev, 111 (2012–13)

==== Playoffs ====
- Most goals in a playoff season: Ralfs Melders, 6 (2013–14)
- Most assists in a playoff season: Victor Lobachev, 12 (2013–14)
- Most points in a playoff season: Aleksandrs Baburins, 15 (2013–14)
- Most penalty minutes in a playoff season: Juris Bērziņš, 37 (2012–13)

== Notable players ==
- Armands Bērziņš
- Edijs Brahmanis
- Kaspars Daugaviņš
- Ralfs Freibergs
- Guntis Galviņš
- Mārtiņš Karsums
- Artūrs Kulda
- Miķelis Rēdlihs
