= 2014–15 Latvian Hockey League season =

2014–15 Latvian Hockey League
- League: Latvian Hockey Higher League
- Sport: Ice hockey
- Number of teams: 7

Regular season
- Winners: HK MOGO

Playoffs

Finals
- Champions: HK MOGO
- Runners-up: HK Kurbads

Latvian Hockey League seasons
- ← 2013–14 2015–16 →

The 2014–15 Latvian Hockey League season was the 24th season of the Latvian Hockey League, the top level of ice hockey in Latvia. Seven teams participated in the league, and HK MOGO won the championship.

== Regular season ==
Pos	Team	Pld	W	OTW	OTL	L	GF	GA	GD	Pts	Final Result
1	HK MOGO	30	23	1	2	4	160	82	+78	73	Advance to Playoffs Semifinals
2	HK Liepāja	30	18	4	4	4	167	91	+76	66	Advance to Playoffs Quarterfinals
3	HK Kurbads	30	20	1	2	7	167	81	+86	64	Advance to Playoffs Quarterfinals
4	HS Rīga/Prizma	30	13	3	2	12	114	113	+1	47	Advance to Playoffs Quarterfinals
5	HK Zemgale/JLSS	30	13	2	1	14	103	110	−7	44	Advance to Playoffs Quarterfinals
6	Ogre/Sāga97	30	3	1	1	25	77	191	−114	12	Advance to Playoffs Quarterfinals
7	Jūrmala HASC	30	2	1	1	26	73	193	−120	9	Advance to Playoffs Quarterfinals

Source: Latvian Ice Hockey Federation

== Playoffs ==
Quarterfinals
4	HS Rīga/Prizma	2
5	HK Zemgale/JLSS	3
2	HK Liepāja	3
7	Jūrmala HASC	0
3	HK Kurbads	3
6	Ogre/Sāga97	0

Semifinals
1	HK MOGO	3
5	HK Zemgale/JLSS	1
2	HK Liepāja	1
3	HK Kurbads	3

Final
1	HK MOGO	4
3	HK Kurbads	2
Third place
2	HK Liepāja	3
5	HK Zemgale/JLSS	1

Source: Latvian Ice Hockey Federation
