= 2015–16 Latvian Hockey League season =

2015–16 Latvian Hockey League
- League: Latvian Hockey Higher League
- Sport: Ice hockey
- Number of teams: 7

Regular season
- Winners: HK Liepāja

Playoffs

Finals
- Champions: HK Liepāja
- Runners-up: HK Kurbads

Latvian Hockey League seasons
- ← 2014–15 2016–17 →

The 2015–16 Latvian Hockey League season was the 25th season of the Latvian Hockey League, the top level of ice hockey in Latvia. Seven teams participated in the league, and HK Liepāja won the championship.

== Regular season ==
Pos	Team	Pld	W	OTW	OTL	L	GF	GA	GD	Pts	Final Result
1	HK Liepāja	30	22	1	2	5	165	93	+72	70	Advance to Playoffs Semifinals
2	HK MOGO	30	19	4	2	5	169	83	+86	67	Advance to Playoffs Semifinals
3	HK Kurbads	30	18	4	3	5	162	74	+88	65	Advance to Playoffs Quarterfinals
4	HK Zemgale/JLSS	30	17	1	1	11	137	87	+50	54	Advance to Playoffs Quarterfinals
5	HK Prizma	30	12	1	1	16	110	101	+9	39	Advance to Playoffs Quarterfinals
6	HS Rīga	30	4	0	2	24	59	164	−105	14	Advance to Playoffs Quarterfinals
7	HS Rīga99/HK Tukums	30	2	0	0	28	59	259	−200	6	

Source: Latvian Ice Hockey Federation

== Playoffs ==
Quarterfinals
4	HK Zemgale/JLSS	1
5	HK Prizma	3
3	HK Kurbads	3
6	HS Rīga	0

Semifinals
1	HK Liepāja	3
5	HK Prizma	1
2	HK MOGO	1
3	HK Kurbads	3

Final
1	HK Liepāja	4
3	HK Kurbads	3
Third place
2	HK MOGO	3
5	HK Prizma	1
