= 2016–17 Latvian Hockey League season =

2016–17 Latvian Hockey League
- League: Latvian Hockey Higher League
- Sport: Ice hockey
- Number of teams: 7

Regular season
- Winners: HK MOGO

Playoffs

Finals
- Champions: HK Kurbads
- Runners-up: HK MOGO

Latvian Hockey League seasons
- ← 2015–16 2017–18 →

The 2016–17 Latvian Hockey League season was the 26th season of the Latvian Hockey League, the top level of ice hockey in Latvia. Seven teams participated in the league, and HK Kurbads won the championship.

== Regular season ==
Pos	Team	Pld	W	OTW	OTL	L	GF	GA	GD	Pts	Final Result
1	HK MOGO	30	21	3	1	5	196	94	+102	70	Advance to Playoffs Semifinals
2	HK Kurbads	30	19	3	1	7	144	83	+61	64	Advance to Playoffs Semifinals
3	HK Zemgale/JLSS	30	18	2	3	7	137	85	+52	61	Advance to Playoffs Quarterfinals
4	HK Liepāja	30	18	0	0	12	182	99	+83	54	Advance to Playoffs Quarterfinals
5	HS Rīga	30	11	0	3	16	106	131	−25	36	Advance to Playoffs Quarterfinals
6	HK Prizma	30	8	2	1	19	131	152	−21	29	Advance to Playoffs Quarterfinals
7	Prizma/Pārdaugava	30	0	0	1	29	57	309	−252	1	

Source: Latvian Ice Hockey Federation

== Playoffs ==
Quarterfinals
4	HK Liepāja	3
5	HS Rīga	2
3	HK Zemgale/JLSS	3
6	HK Prizma	0

Semifinals
1	HK MOGO	3
4	HK Liepāja	2
2	HK Kurbads	3
3	HK Zemgale/JLSS	2

Final
1	HK MOGO	3
2	HK Kurbads	4
