= HK Liepāja =

Ice hockey team in Liepāja, Latvia

- City: Liepāja, Latvia
- League: Optibet Hockey League; 2014 - 2022
- Founded: 2014
- Home arena: Liepājas Olimpiskā Centra ice hall (capacity: 1143)
- Colours: Green, red, white
- General manager: Kaspars Repss
- Head coach: Normunds Sējējs
- Captain: Bruno Zabis
- Website: hkliepaja.lv

Championships
- Playoff championships: 1 (2016)

HK Liepāja are a Latvian professional ice hockey team. The team is based in Liepāja and play their home games at the Liepājas Olimpiskā Centra ice hall.

== History ==
Hokeja Klubs Liepāja was founded in 2014, following the collapse of the previous team in the city; HK Liepājas Metalurgs folded as a result of their title sponsor, Liepājas Metalurgs, pulling funding as a result of financial difficulties steming from the Great Recession. Several months later, the company would declare themselves insolvent. The eight Latvian championships won by won HK Liepājas Metalurgs is, as of February 2021, the most won by any team.

HK Liepāja began play in the 2014–15 Latvian Hockey League season and immediately assembled a strong side, finishing 2nd in the regular season before losing in the play-offs semi-finals to HK Kurbads. They would pick up a medal however, as they beat HK Zemgale in the bronze medal game. The team fared even better in their second season, finishing 1st in the regular season, before going on to claim the Latvian championship by beating HK Kurbads in the play-off final. The following season saw Liepāja finish 4th overall, before losing in the play-off semi-finals to HK Mogo. The 2017-18 season saw the team improve in the regular season, finishing 2nd, however, they again losing in the play-off semi-finals to Kurbads, who would ultimately go on to win the league. In the off-season the team parted ways with Head Coach Igors Ļebedevs, who subsequently joined HK Zemgale as an Assistant Coach, and replaced him with Maksims Bogdanovs. Under their new coach, Liepāja's fortunes worsened, finishing the 2018-19 season in 5th place, causing them to miss out on the play-offs for the first year since their inception. The 2019-20 season saw the team finish in 4th place before the play-offs were cancelled due to the COVID-19 pandemic. In the off-season, Bogdanovs was replaced with former KHL Head Coach and General Manager Normunds Sējējs.

Due to winning the Latvian league in 2016, the team qualified for the 2016–17 IIHF Continental Cup, where they were drawn in Group B alongside Turkish side Zeytinburnu Belediyespor, CH Jaca of Spain, and British champions Nottingham Panthers. HK Liepāja would comfortably beat both CH Jaca and Zeytinburnu Belediyespor before losing their final game against the Panthers. As a result, Liepāja finished 2nd in their group, and did not progress any further in the competition. The Panthers, who finished Group B in 1st place, would ultimately go on to win the Continental Cup.

In 2020 HK Liepāja took place in the inaugural Baltic Hockey League, a competition made up of two teams from each of Estonia, Latvia and Lithuania. Liepāja represented Latvia alongside compatriots HK Mogo.They went on to win their group, beating both Estonian outfit HC Everest, and Hockey Punks Vilnius of Lithuania. As a result they progressed to the final round, due initially to take place in December 2020, however, this was postponed until February 2021 as a result of several HK Mogo players having been exposed to COVID-19. In early February the final round was again postponed due to the pandemic, with the date to be announced when the Covid situation improves.

== Roster ==
Updated February 17, 2021.

Goaltenders
Number		Player	Catches	Acquired	Place of Birth
35	(Latvia)	Māris Jučers	L	2019	Priekule, Latvia
76	(Latvia)	Patriks Bērziņš	L	2020	Talsi, Latvia
74	(Lithuania)	Laurinas Lubys	L	2020	Klaipėda, Lithuania

Defencemen
Number		Player	Shoots	Acquired	Place of Birth
3	(Latvia)	Kristers Freibergs	L	2019	Liepāja, Latvia
5	(Latvia)	Mārtiņš Oskars Freimanis	L	2019	Liepāja, Latvia
9	(Lithuania)	Paulius Rumševičius	R	2018	Elektrėnai, Lithuania
12	(Latvia)	Kristaps Nīmanis	L	2020	Liepāja, Latvia
18	(Latvia)	Ralfs Grinbergs	L	2019	Riga, Latvia
22	(Latvia)	Mārtiņš Gipters (A)	L	2020	Riga, Latvia
24	(Latvia)	Matīss Petrovics	L	2020	Liepāja, Latvia
36	(Latvia)	Romāns Ņekļudovs	L	2014	Liepāja, Latvia
58	(Latvia)	Renārs Kamergrauzis	L	2020	-
23	(Latvia)	Ričards Birziņš	R	2020	Riga, Latvia
82	(Latvia)	Emīls Auziņš	R	2020	Liepāja, Latvia
8	(Latvia)	Reinis Demiters	L	2019	Aizpute, Latvia
55	(Latvia)	Artūrs Salija	L	2020	Riga, Latvia

Forwards
Number		Player	Shoots	Position	Acquired	Place of Birth
7	(Latvia)	Raivo Freidenfelds	L	C	2020	Grobiņa, Latvia
10	(Latvia)	Bruno Zabis (C)	L	C/LW	2017	Liepāja, Latvia
11	(Latvia)	Linards Mazurs-Mago	L	LW	2020	Liepāja, Latvia
13	(Latvia)	Egils Kalns	R	LW/RW	2020	Liepāja, Latvia
33	(Latvia)	Deniss Vilmans	R	W	2018	Liepāja, Latvia
16	(Latvia)	Roberts Krieviņš	L	F	2020	Liepāja, Latvia
19	(Latvia)	Valters Freijs	L	RW	2016	Talsi, Latvia
25	(Latvia)	Kārlis Ozoliņš	L	C	2020	Riga, Latvia
31	(Lithuania)	Mark Kaleinikovas	R	LW	2019	Kaunas, Lithuania
44	(Latvia)	Klāvs Plānics	L	C	2019	Brocēni, Latvia
47	(Latvia)	Miks Krišs Rungovskis	L	C	2018	-
53	(Latvia)	Karolis Krasilnikovas	L	F	2019	Elektrėnai, Lithuania
59	(Latvia)	Niks Zīle	L	F	2019	Liepāja, Latvia
77	(Latvia)	Māris Miezis	R	F	2019	Jelgava, Latvia
88	(Latvia)	Rihards Ričards Fomins	L	F	2017	Liepāja, Latvia
91	(Latvia)	Artūrs Mickevičs (A)	R	RW/LW	2020	Talsi, Latvia
52	(Ukraine)	Bohdan Panasenko	R	LW	2019	Kharkiv, Ukraine

== Season-by-season record ==
Note: GP = Games played, W = Wins, L = Losses, T = Ties, OTL = Overtime losses, Pts = Points, GF = Goals for, GA = Goals against, PIM = Penalties in minutes

Season	League	GP	W	L	T	OTW	OTL	Pts	GF	GA	Finish	Playoffs
2015-16	Latvian Hockey Higher League	30	22	5	—	1	2	70	165	93	1st	Champion
2016-17	Latvian Hockey Higher League	30	18	12	—	0	0	54	182	99	4th	Semi-final loss
2017-18	Optibet Hockey League	30	17	7	—	3	3	60	144	94	2nd	Semi-final loss
2018-19	Optibet Hockey League	36	14	18	—	2	2	48	100	120	5th	Did not qualify
2019-20	Optibet Hockey League	35	20	10	—	3	2	48	132	94	4th	Playoffs cancelled

== Honours ==
Latvian Championships:

- 2016

== Team records ==
=== Career ===
These are the top five scorers in HK Liepāja history.

Note: Pos = Position; GP = Games played; G = Goals; A = Assists; Pts = Points

Player	Pos	GP	G	A	Pts
Bruno Zabis	F	149	85	153	238
Māris Diļevka	F	146	77	121	198
Egils Kalns	F	107	63	54	117
Valters Freijs	F	156	57	60	117
Klāvs Plānics	F	130	39	68	107

Penalty minutes: Dmitrijs Korņilovs, 214

=== Season ===
==== Regular season ====
- Most goals in a season: Mark Kaleinikovas, 26 (2019-20)
- Most assists in a season: Bruno Zabis, 37 (2014-15)
- Most points in a season: Bruno Zabis, 58 (2014-15)
- Most penalty minutes in a season: Dmitrijs Korņilovs, 117 (2015–16)

==== Playoffs ====
- Most goals in a playoff season: Egils Kalns, 8 (2015–16)
- Most assists in a playoff season: Bruno Zabis, 12 (2015–16)
- Most points in a playoff season: Bruno Zabis, 19 (2015–16)
- Most penalty minutes in a playoff season: Dmitrijs Korņilovs, 46 (2014–15)

== Notable players ==
- Roberts Bukarts
- Mārtiņš Dzierkals
- Māris Jučers
- Dmitri Pestunov

== Notable coaches ==
- Normunds Sējējs
