= 2012–13 Latvian Hockey League season =

2012–13 Latvian Hockey League
- League: Latvian Hockey Higher League
- Sport: Ice hockey
- Number of teams: 8

Regular season
- Winners: HK SMScredit

Playoffs

Finals
- Champions: HK SMScredit
- Runners-up: HK Riga Juniors

Latvian Hockey League seasons
- ← 2011–12 2013–14 →

The 2012–13 Latvian Hockey League season was the 22nd season of the Latvian Hockey League, the top level of ice hockey in Latvia. Eight teams participated in the league, and HK SMScredit won the championship.

== Regular season ==
	Club	GP	W	OTW	OTL	L	Goals	Pts
1.	HK SMScredit	28	24	0	1	3	189:88	73
2.	HK Riga Juniors	28	18	3	0	7	122:67	60
3.	HK Ozolnieki/Monarhs	28	17	2	1	8	136:87	56
4.	HK Liepājas Metalurgs II	28	16	1	3	8	120:86	53
5.	JLSS Zemgale	28	14	2	1	11	144:125	47
6.	Prizma Riga	28	6	1	3	18	97:146	23
7.	Prizma Riga II	28	4	1	0	23	72:148	14
8.	SK Riga 96	28	3	0	1	24	83:216	10

== Playoffs ==
Quarter-finals
HK SMScredit
Bye
HK Liepājas Metalurgs II	2
JLSS Zemgale	0
HK Ozolnieki/Monarhs	2
Prizma Riga	0
HK Riga Juniors
Bye

Semi-finals
HK SMScredit	2
HK Liepājas Metalurgs II	0
HK Ozolnieki/Monarhs	1
HK Riga Juniors	2

Final
HK SMScredit	3
HK Riga Juniors	0
