= 2011–12 Latvian Hockey League season =

2011–12 Latvian Hockey League
- League: Latvian Hockey Higher League
- Sport: Ice hockey
- Number of teams: 10

Regular season
- Winners: HK Ozolnieki/Monarhs

Playoffs

Finals
- Champions: HK Liepājas Metalurgs II
- Runners-up: HK Ozolnieki/Monarhs

Latvian Hockey League seasons
- ← 2010–11 2012–13 →

The 2011–12 Latvian Hockey League season was the 21st season of the Latvian Hockey League, the top level of ice hockey in Latvia. Nine teams participated in the league, and HK Liepājas Metalurgs won the championship.

== Regular season ==
	Club	GP	W	OTW	OTL	L	GF:GA	Pts
1.	(Latvia) HK Ozolnieki/Monarhs	36	29	1	2	4	190:95	91
2.	(Latvia) HK SMScredit	36	23	5	0	8	210:120	79
3.	(Latvia) HK Liepājas Metalurgs II	36	22	3	3	8	178:89	75
4.	(Latvia) HK Juniors	36	20	1	3	12	170:111	65
5.	(Latvia) JLSS/Zemgale	36	20	2	0	14	173:158	64
6.	(Lithuania) SC Energija	36	12	2	6	16	138:143	46
7.	(Latvia) HS Riga 95	36	13	2	2	19	113:147	45
8.	(Latvia) HS Riga/Prizma	36	12	2	3	19	115:143	43
9.	(Latvia) DHK Latgale	36	9	1	0	26	110:176	29
10.	(Latvia) HK Riga/LSPA	36	0	1	1	34	91:306	3

Note: SC Energija of Elektrenai remained invited to the league but were not allowed to participate in the play-offs.

== Playoffs ==
Quarterfinals

- HK Juniors - JLSS/Zemgale 3-0 on series
- HK Liepajas Metalurgs II - HK Riga 95 3-0 on series

Semifinals

- HK Ozolnieki/Monarhs - HK Juniors 4-0 on series
- HK Liepajas Metalurgs II - HK SMScredit 4-2 on series

Final

- HK Liepajas Metalurgs II - HK Ozolnieki/Monarhs 4-1 on series
