= 2017–18 Latvian Hockey League season =

2017–18 Latvian Hockey League
- League: Latvian Hockey Higher League
- Sport: Ice hockey
- Number of teams: 6

Regular season
- Winners: HK MOGO

Playoffs

Finals
- Champions: HK Kurbads
- Runners-up: HK Zemgale/JLSS

Latvian Hockey League seasons
- ← 2016–17 2018–19 →

The 2017–18 Latvian Hockey League season was the 27th season of the Latvian Hockey League, the top level of ice hockey in Latvia. Six teams participated in the league, and HK Kurbads won the championship.

== Regular season ==
Pos	Team	Pld	W	OTW	OTL	L	GF	GA	GD	Pts	Final Result
1	HK MOGO	30	21	4	1	4	147	74	+73	72	Advance to Playoffs
2	HK Liepāja/Optibet	30	17	3	3	7	144	94	+50	60	Advance to Playoffs
3	HK Kurbads	30	17	2	4	7	131	75	+56	59	Advance to Playoffs
4	HK Zemgale/JLSS	30	12	4	1	13	87	94	−7	45	Advance to Playoffs
5	HS Rīga	30	3	3	4	20	82	168	−86	19	
6	HK Prizma	30	3	1	4	22	55	141	−86	15	

Source: Latvian Ice Hockey Federation

== Playoffs ==
Semifinals
1	HK MOGO	2
4	HK Zemgale/JLSS	4
2	HK Liepāja/Optibet	1
3	HK Kurbads	4

Final
4	HK Zemgale/JLSS	0
3	HK Kurbads	4
