= Latvia men's national junior ice hockey team =

Latvia
- Association: Latvian Ice Hockey Federation
- Head coach: (Latvia) Artis Ābols
- Assistants: (Latvia) Kārlis Zirnis (Latvia) Edgars Masaļskis
- Captain: Dans Ločmelis
- Most points: Aleksandrs Ņiživijs (45)
- IIHF code: LAT

First international
- Latvia 47 – 1 Greece (Riga, Latvia; November 10, 1992)

Biggest win
- Latvia 47 – 1 Greece (Riga, Latvia; November 10, 1992)

Biggest defeat
- Canada 16 – 0 Latvia (Saskatoon, Saskatchewan, Canada; December 26, 2009)

IIHF World Junior Championship
- Appearances: 34 (first in 1993)
- Best result: 7th (2022 (August), 2025, 2026)

International record (W–L–T)
- 92-86-6

The Latvian men's national under 20 ice hockey team is the national under-20 ice hockey team in Latvia. The team represents Latvia at the International Ice Hockey Federation's IIHF World Junior Championship.

They have played at the top division of the tournament seven times; it has been at the top division since the 2022 tournament, where Latvia was called up to replace Russia in the rescheduled tournament due to the country being banned from international ice hockey (Latvia had originally been promoted for 2023). During the tournament, Latvia won its first-ever preliminary round game in the top division. In the 2025 edition of the tournament, the Latvians had a major upset win over Canada, regarded as one of the best upsets in the history of the tournament.

== History ==
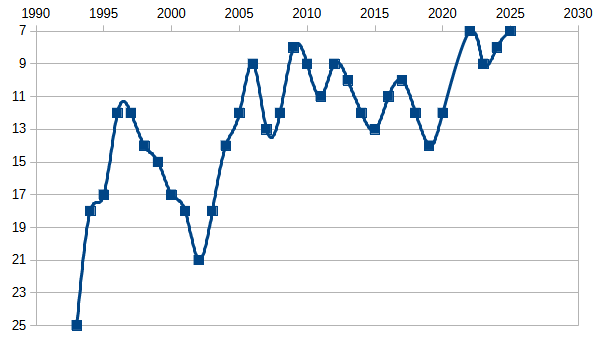
Graph shows Latvian results in IIHF World Championship since 1993.

Division	Championship	Finish	Rank
Pool C	(Belarus) 1993 Minsk	Qualified	25th (1st in Pool C Qualification)
Pool C	(Denmark) 1994 Odense/Esbjerg	Promoted	18th (2nd in Pool C)
Pool C1	(Spain) 1995 Puigcerda	Promoted	17th (1st in Pool C1)
Pool B	(Poland) 1996 Sosnowiec/Tychy	Final round	12th (2nd in Pool B)
Pool B	(Ukraine) 1997 Kyiv	Group round	12th (2nd in Pool B)
Pool B	(Poland) 1998 Sosnowiec/Tychy	Final round	14th (4th in Pool B)
Pool B	(Hungary) 1999 Dunaújváros	Final round	15th (5th in Pool B)
Pool B	(Belarus) 2000 Minsk	Relegation round	17th (7th in Pool B)
Division I	(Germany) 2001 Landsberg/Füssen	relegated	18th (8th in Division I)
Division II	(Croatia) 2002 Zagreb	Promoted	21st (2nd in Division IIA)
Division I	(Slovenia) 2003 Bled	Group stage	18th (4th in Division IB)
Division I	(Germany) 2004 Berlin	Group stage	14th (4th in Division IA)
Division I	(Estonia) 2005 Narva	Promoted	12th (1st in Division IB)
Top Division	(Canada) 2006 British Columbia	relegated	9th
Division I	(Denmark) 2007 Odense	Group stage	13th (2nd in Division IA)
Division I	(Latvia) 2008 Riga	Promoted	12th (1st in Division IB)
Top Division	(Canada) 2009 Ottawa	Relegation round	8th
Top Division	(Canada) 2010 Saskatchewan	relegated	9th
Division I	(Belarus) 2011 Babruysk	Promoted	11th (1st in Division IA)
Top Division	(Canada) 2012 Calgary/Edmonton	Relegation round	9th
Top Division	(Russia) 2013 Ufa	relegated	10th
Division I	(Poland) 2014 Sanok	Group stage	12th (2nd in Division IA)
Division I	(Italy) 2015 Asiago	Group stage	13th (3rd in Division IA)
Division I	(Austria) 2016 Vienna	Promoted	11th (1st in Division IA)
Top Division	(Canada) 2017 Montreal/Toronto	relegated	10th
Division I	(France) 2018 Courchevel/Meribel	Group stage	12th (2nd in Division IA)
Division I	(Germany) 2019 Füssen	Group stage	14th (4th in Division IA)
Division I	(Belarus) 2020 Minsk	Group stage	12th (2nd in Division IA)
Division I	(Denmark) 2021 Hørsholm	Cancelled due to the COVID-19 pandemic	
Division I	(Denmark) 2022 Hørsholm	Promoted	12th (2nd in Division IA)
Top Division	(Canada) 2022 Edmonton	Quarterfinals	7th
Top Division	(Canada) 2023 Halifax/Moncton	Relegation Round	9th
Top Division	(Sweden) 2024 Gothenburg	Quarterfinals	8th
Top Division	(Canada) 2025 Ottawa	Quarterfinals	7th
Top Division	(United States) 2026 Minneapolis/Saint Paul	Quarterfinals	7th
