= 2000 IIHF World Championship final =

Ice hockey match

	1	2	3	Total
Slovakia	0	1	2	3
Czech Republic	3	0	2	5
- Date: May 14, 2000
- Arena: Ice Palace Arena
- City: Saint Petersburg
- Attendance: 12,350

The 2000 IIHF World Championship final was an ice hockey match that took place on 14 May 2000 at the Ice Palace in Saint Petersburg, Russia, to determine the winner of the 2000 IIHF World Championship. The Czech Republic defeated Slovakia 5–3 to win its second championship.

== Background ==
The game marked the first time the two former member-nations of Czechoslovakia would meet each other Final, after becoming independent in 1993, just about seven years before. It also was the first time independent Slovakia would reach the finals of the IIHF World Championships, jumping up from a previous best placement of seventh, achieved in both 1999 and 1998. For the independent Czech Republic, it was its third-ever finals participation after its gold medal wins in both 1996 and 1999.

== Venue ==
The Ice Palace in Saint Petersburg was determined to host the final of the championship. Previously at the tournament, the venue hosted both semi-finals and also the bronze medal match. In the final, the attendance was 12,350, 100.4 percent of its total capacity.

== The Match ==
=== Summary ===
Michal Sýkora started the scoring for the Czech Republic six minutes into the game, assisted by Martin Procházka and Václav Varaďa. Just over three minutes later, Tomáš Vlasák buried a centering pass from Petr Buzek. Procházka added another for the Czechs at 12:25 of the first, assisted by Vlasák and Pavel Patera.

7:43 into the second period, Martin Štrbák scored to put the Slovaks on the board, assisted by Radoslav Suchý. The Czechs suffered some penalty problems, accumulating ten minor penalties, with five coming in the second period alone, though due to the strong play of their goaltender Roman Čechmánek, the team held their lead.

Jan Tomajko scored at 3:45 into the final period to put the Czechs up 4–1, and this would hold as the game-winning goal. Miroslav Hlinka and Miroslav Šatan both scored late goals for Slovakia to make the game 4–3, with Šatan's goal giving him the tournament scoring title over Jiří Dopita. Robert Reichel's goal with just over one minute left in the game ended any hopes of a Slovak comeback, securing the Czech Republic's third gold medal at the World Championships in the span of just five years.

=== Details ===
14 May 2000; 18:30	Slovakia	3–5 (0–3, 1–0, 2–2)	Czech Republic	Ice Palace Arena, Saint Petersburg; Attendance: 12,350

Game reference

Jan Lasak
Goalies
Roman Cechmanek
Referee:
(Canada) K. Acheson
Linesmen:
(Canada) S. Carpentier
(United States) J. Costello

	0–1	6:04 – M. Sýkora (M. Procházka, V. Varaďa)
	0–2	9:34 – T. Vlasák (P. Buzek)
	0–3	12:25 – M. Procházka (T. Vlasák, P. Patera)
M. Štrbák (R. Suchý, P. Pucher) – 27:43	1–3
	1–4	43:45 – J. Tomajko (J. Dopita, D. Výborný)
M. Hlinka – 55:22	2–4
M. Šatan (L. Bartečko) – 57:38	3–4
	3–5	58:58 – R. Reichel (M. Sýkora, V. Prospal)

5 min
Penalties
10 min
33
Shots
15

== See also ==
- 2000 IIHF World Championship
- Slovakia men's national ice hockey team
- Czech Republic men's national ice hockey team
