= Leonīds Beresņevs =

Latvian ice hockey player

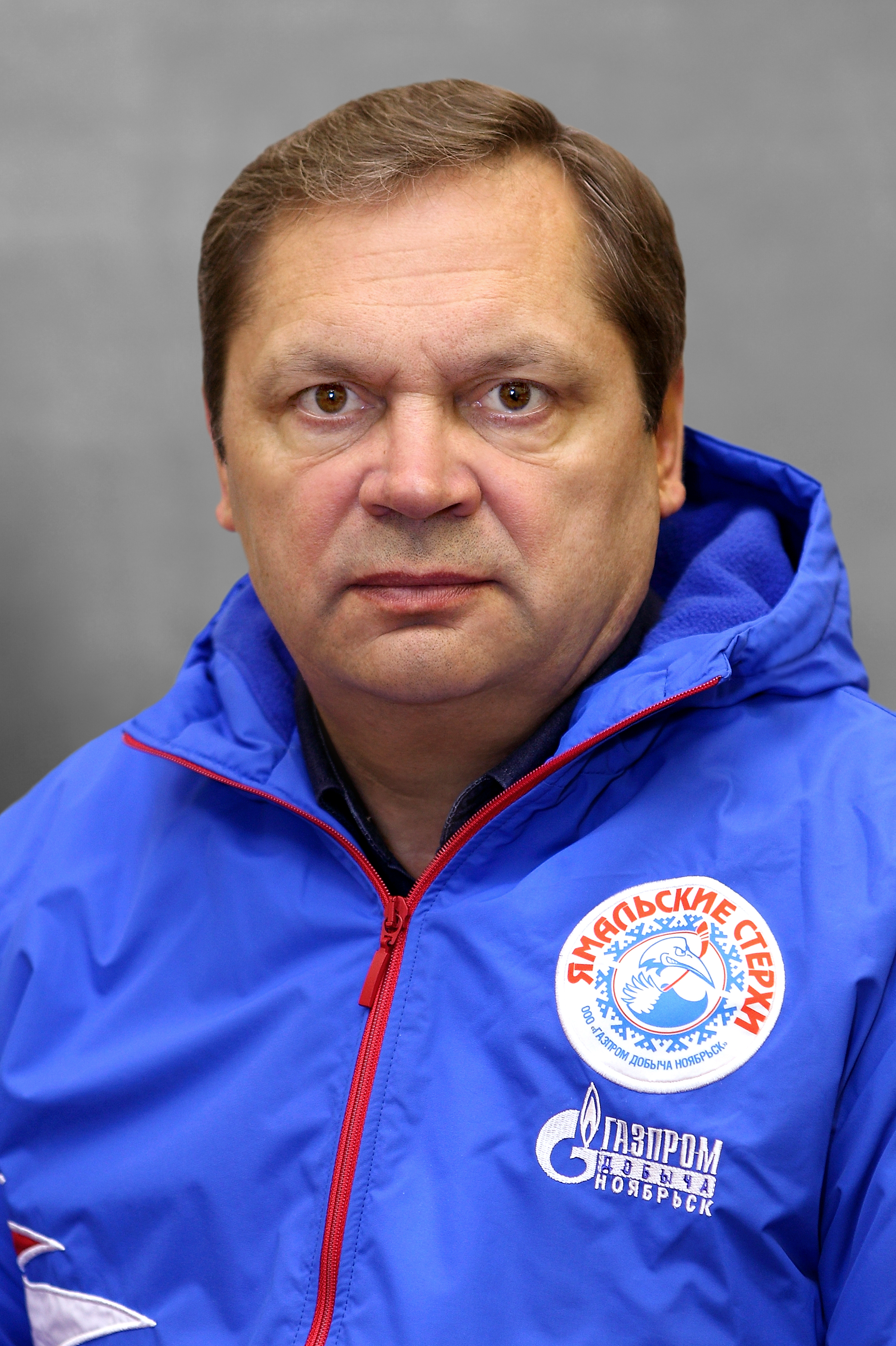
- Born: July 6, 1958 (age 66); Kirovo-Chepetsk, Kirov Oblast, Russian SFSR, Soviet Union
- Position: Defence
- Played for: Traktor Chelyabinsk; Dinamo Riga; Izhstal Izhevsk; Latvijas Zelts Riga; HK Nik's Brih Riga; HK Lido Nafta Riga
- Playing career: 1977–1997

Leonīds Beresņevs (Russian: Леони́д Арка́дьевич Бе́реснев, Leonid Arkadyevich Beresnev; born 6 July 1958) is a Latvian/Soviet former ice hockey player and coach.

Born in Kirov Oblast he is a coach of the Latvian U-20 junior team.

His first term of coaching the Latvian national team was from 1996 till 1999. In the 1996 world championships, when Latvia was playing in division B, they won and for the first time were promoted to division A where they finished at 7th place in 1997. From that time they have remained in division A.

Beresņevs' second term started in 2004 and ended in 2006. In 2005 Latvia qualified for Torino Olympics where they took the last place.

Beresņevs has been a coach for almost all the best Latvian ice hockey clubs since 1995. In 1996/1997 his coached Juniors Riga took gold at EEHL. In 2003/2004 Beresņevs was head coach in Russian Hockey Super League team Amur Khabarovsk. In 2007-08 he trained Estonian ice hockey club Tartu Big Diamonds and in 2008-09 he became the coach of Latvian club ASK/Ogre.

== Career statistics (as a player) ==
			Regular Season					Playoffs
Season	Team	League	GP	G	A	Pts	PIM	GP	G	A	Pts	PIM
1985-86	Dinamo Rīga	Russian Hockey Super League	19	1	0	1	8	--	--	--	--	--
1986-87	Dinamo Rīga	Russian Hockey Super League	37	0	1	1	26	--	--	--	--	--
1987-88	Izhstal Izhevsk	Russian Hockey Super League	26	3	2	5	8	--	--	--	--	--
1990-91	Dinamo Rīga	EEHL Div. B	43	0	1	1	20	--	--	--	--	--
1992-93	Latvijas Zelts Rīga	Latvian hockey league	22	6	35	41	22	--	--	--	--	--
1993-94	Latvijas Zelts Rīga	Latvian hockey league	15	6	19	25	20	--	--	--	--	--
1994-95	HK Nik's Brih Riga	Latvian hockey league	12	1	6	7	8	--	--	--	--	--
1996-97	HK Lido Nafta Riga	Latvian hockey league	15	2	4	6	12	--	--	--	--	--

Preceded by Ēvalds Grabovskis; Curt Lindström; Aleksandrs Beļavskis	Latvian national ice hockey team coach 1996–1999; 2004–2006; 2016	Succeeded by Haralds Vasiļjevs; Pyotr Vorobyov; Haralds Vasiļjevs
