= Edmunds Vasiļjevs =

Latvian ice hockey player

Edmunds Vasiļjevs (born 20 February 1954) is retired Latvian professional ice hockey player. During his career he played for Dinamo Riga club in Soviet Championship League. He currently coaches children at his ice hockey school. His brother is a former ice hockey player Team Latvia couch Haralds Vasiļjevs. His nephew Herberts Vasiļjevs plays for Team Latvia and Krefeld Pinguine of DEL.
