= Waltteri =

Waltteri is a given name. People associated with the name include:

- Waltteri Väyrynen
- Waltteri Merelä
- Waltteri Immonen
- Waltteri Ruuskanen
- Waltteri Hopponen
- Waltteri Torikka
