= Harijs Vītoliņš =

Latvian ice hockey player and coach

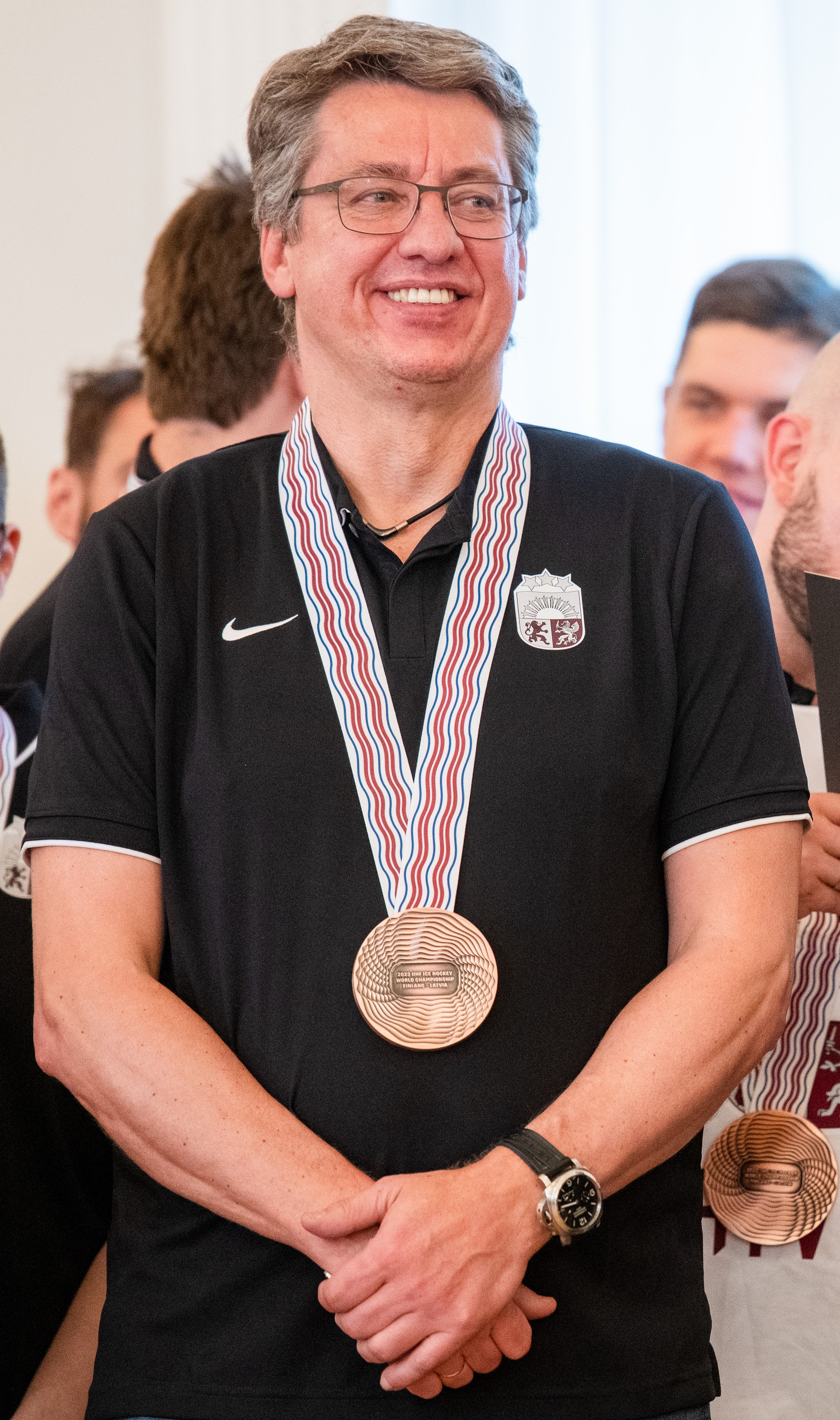
- Harijs Vītoliņš, 2023
- Born: April 30, 1968 (age 57) Riga, Latvian SSR, Soviet Union
- Height: 6 ft 3 in (191 cm)
- Weight: 224 lb (102 kg; 16 st 0 lb)
- Position: Centre
- Shot: Right
- Played for: Winnipeg Jets
- National team: Latvia
- NHL draft: 188th overall, 1988; Montreal Canadiens; 228th overall, 1993; Winnipeg Jets
- Playing career: 1986–2005

Harijs Vītoliņš (Harijs Vitolinsh; born April 30, 1968) is a Latvian former professional ice hockey centre. After being selected twice in the NHL entry draft, Vītoliņš played eight games in the National Hockey League with the Winnipeg Jets during the 1993–94 season, going scoreless. Since 2021, he has been the Head Coach of Latvia men's national ice hockey.

Vītoliņš was promoted to head coach of Dynamo Moscow after Oleg Znaroks was named as Zinetula Bilyaletdinov's successor as Russia's head coach. Vītoliņš also served as an assistant to Znaroks. In May 2014, the Russian national team coached by Znaroks and Vītoliņš won the world ice hockey championship in Minsk, Belarus.

== Career statistics ==
=== Regular season and playoffs ===
			Regular season					Playoffs
Season	Team	League	GP	G	A	Pts	PIM	GP	G	A	Pts	PIM
1984–85	Latvijas Berzs	URS.3	—	5	—	—	—	—	—	—	—	—
1985–86	RASMS Rīga	URS.3	20	9	1	10	8	—	—	—	—	—
1986–87	Dinamo Rīga	Soviet	17	1	1	2	8	—	—	—	—	—
1987–88	Dinamo Rīga	Soviet	30	3	3	6	24	—	—	—	—	—
1987–88	RASMS Rīga	URS.3	16	7	7	14	24	—	—	—	—	—
1988–89	Dinamo Rīga	Soviet	36	3	2	5	16	—	—	—	—	—
1988–89	RASMS–Energo Rīga	URS.3	10	3	4	7	0	—	—	—	—	—
1989–90	Dinamo Rīga	Soviet	45	7	6	13	18	—	—	—	—	—
1990–91	Dinamo Rīga	Soviet	46	12	19	31	22	—	—	—	—	—
1991–92	Stars Rīga	CIS	30	12	5	17	10	—	—	—	—	—
1992–93	Thunder Bay Thunder Hawks	CoHL	8	6	7	13	12	—	—	—	—	—
1992–93	New Haven Senators	AHL	7	6	3	9	4	—	—	—	—	—
1992–93	EHC Chur	NDA	17	12	6	18	21	—	—	—	—	—
1993–94	Winnipeg Jets	NHL	8	0	0	0	4	—	—	—	—	—
1993–94	Moncton Hawks	AHL	70	28	34	62	41	20	1	3	4	4
1994–95	SC Rapperswil–Jona	NDA	30	6	17	23	50	—	—	—	—	—
1995–96	Rögle BK	SEL	19	3	2	5	24	—	—	—	—	—
1995–96	Rögle BK	Allsv	18	9	10	19	24	10	2	4	6	14
1996–97	EHC Chur	SUI.2	39	25	28	83	58	3	0	1	1	6
1997–98	EHC Chur	SUI.2	39	30	51	81	32	9	5	7	12	6
1998–99	EHC Chur	SUI.2	40	24	38	62	44	18	10	16	26	49
1999–2000	EHC Chur	SUI.2	36	25	23	48	51	17	9	11	20	14
2000–01	EHC Chur	NLA	39	15	14	29	34	—	—	—	—	—
2001–02	HC Thurgau	SUI.2	32	16	21	37	24	3	1	3	4	4
2002–03	HC Thurgau	SUI.2	38	25	28	53	57	5	2	3	5	8
2003–04	HC Thurgau	SUI.2	45	30	40	70	78	6	4	4	8	14
2004–05	HC Thurgau	SUI.2	18	5	11	16	24	—	—	—	—	—
2004–05	SC Langnau	NLA	1	0	0	0	0	—	—	—	—	—
2004–05	HC Ambrì–Piotta	NLA	2	1	1	2	2	—	—	—	—	—
2005–06	Pikes EHC Oberthurgau	SUI.4	14	12	12	24	—	—	—	—	—	—
Soviet/CIS totals			204	38	36	74	98	—	—	—	—	—
NHL totals			8	0	0	0	4	—	—	—	—	—
SUI.2 totals			287	180	270	450	368	61	31	45	76	115

=== International ===
Year	Team	Event	GP	G	A	Pts	PIM
1988	Soviet Union	WJC	7	2	0	2	6
1993	Latvia	WC C	3	3	3	6	4
1995	Latvia	WC B	7	3	4	7	16
1996	Latvia	WC B	7	3	6	9	2
1997	Latvia	WC	8	4	5	9	4
1998	Latvia	WC	6	1	4	5	4
1999	Latvia	WC	6	0	2	2	6
1999	Latvia	WC Q	3	1	2	3	2
2000	Latvia	WC	7	1	1	2	14
2001	Latvia	OGQ	3	1	0	1	2
2001	Latvia	WC	6	1	1	2	4
2002	Latvia	OG	4	2	2	4	0
2002	Latvia	WC	6	1	0	1	2
Senior totals			66	21	30	51	60
