= Curt Lindström =

Swedish ice hockey coach (born 1940)

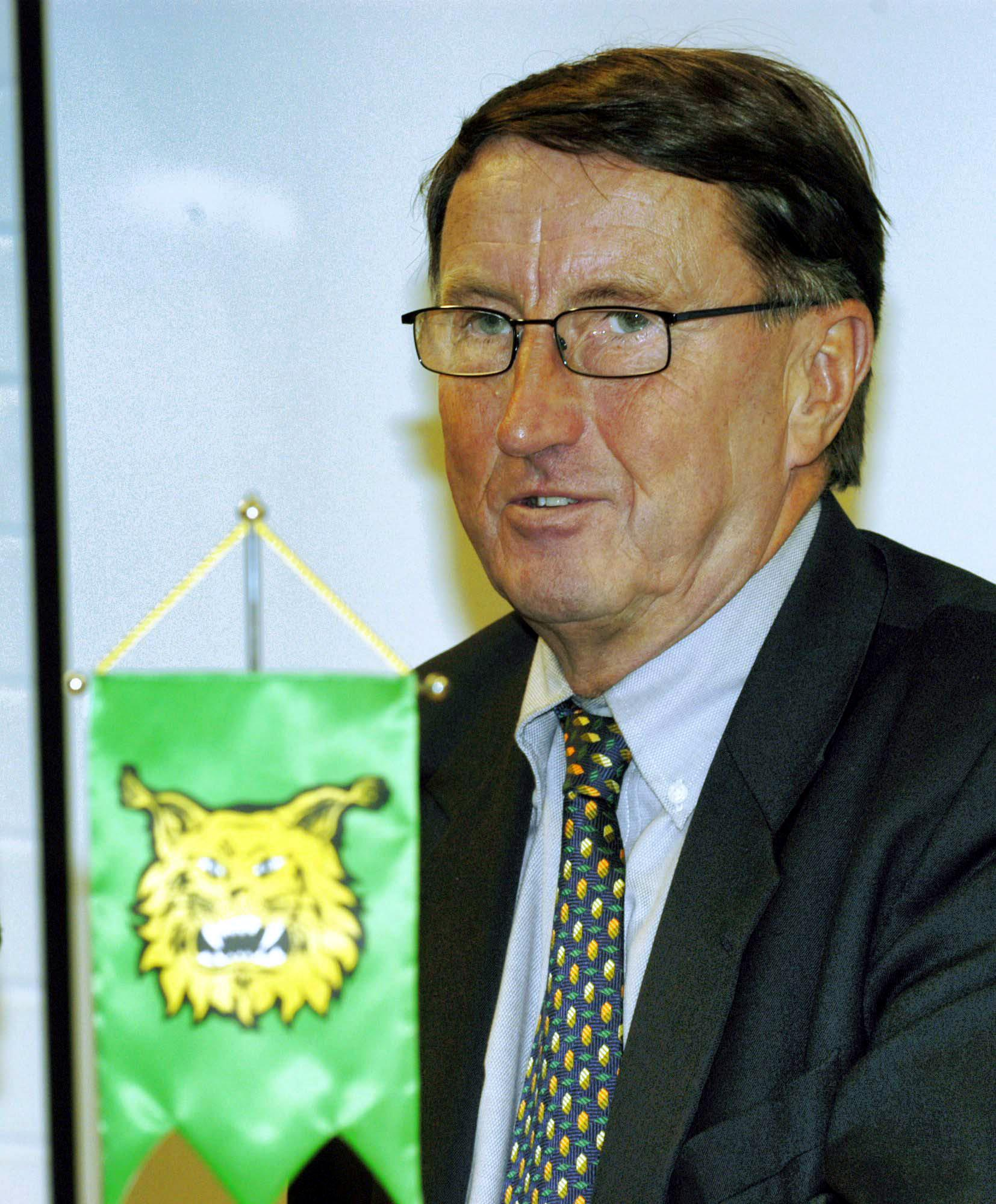

Personal information
- Born: 26 November 1940 (age 85)

Sport
- Sport: ice hockey
- Position: coach
- Club: Ilves
- Team: Latvian national men's ice hockey team; Finnish national men's ice hockey team; Swedish national men's ice hockey team

Achievements and titles
- Olympic finals: (bronze) Winter Olympics: 1994
- World finals: (gold) World Championship: 1987, 1995; (silver) World Championship: 1986, 1994

Curt "Curre" Lindström (born 26 November 1940) is a Swedish ice hockey coach.

== Career on international level ==
He coached Team Finland from 1993 to 1997, winning Finland's first Ice Hockey World Championships gold medal in 1995, and a silver world championships medal as well as Olympic bronze. He has won the same medals in coaching duties with Team Sweden, and has also coached the Latvian national men's ice hockey team.

== Career on club level ==
Lindström stepped in to coach Ilves in the Finnish SM-liiga in the 2004–2005 season after a disappointing start to the season, and led the team to the quarterfinals, where they were beaten by Jokerit. In November 2005, Lindström was hired as a new head coach to Jokerit after the team had a miserable early season under former player and rookie coach Waltteri Immonen. Jokerit were left out of Play Offs at the end of the season. His contract was only for the remainder of the 2005–2006 season, so he left his place as head coach before the start of 2006–2007 season.

== Coaching Awards and honours ==
head coach

- (gold) World Championship (2): 1987, 1995
- (bronze) Winter Olympics (1): 1994
- (silver) World Championship (2): 1986, 1994
- (bronze) Izvestia Tournament (2): 1994, 1996

Assistant coach

- (silver) Canada Cup (1): 1984

== Personal life ==
Lindström lives in a cohabitation with a Thai woman named Wan and spends about eight months of the year in Hua Hin, Thailand. He was diagnosed with Polyneuropathy in 2021.

Preceded by Pentti Matikainen	Finnish national ice hockey team coach 1994–1997	Succeeded by Hannu Aravirta
Preceded by Haralds Vasiļjevs	Latvian national ice hockey team coach 2001–2004	Succeeded by Leonīds Beresņevs
Preceded by Vaclav Sykora	Ilves coach 2004–2005	Succeeded by Kari Eloranta
Preceded by Waltteri Immonen	Jokerit head coach 2005–2006	Succeeded by Doug Shedden
