= Vedējs =

Vedējs or Vedejs is a surname. Notable people with the surname include:

- Edwin Vedejs (1941–2017), Latvian-American professor
- Leonīds Vedējs (1908–1995), Latvian ice hockey player
