= Aleksandrs Beļavskis =

Latvian/Soviet ice hockey player and coach

- Born: January 17, 1964 (age 62) Vitebsk, Byelorussian SSR, Soviet Union
- Height: 6 ft 0 in (183 cm)
- Weight: 187 lb (85 kg; 13 st 5 lb)
- Position: Right wing
- Shot: Left
- Played for: Dinamo Riga; IF Björklöven; Frölunda HC
- National team: Latvia
- Playing career: 1982–2003

Aleksandrs Beļavskis (Russian: Александр Иосифович Белявский, Belarusian: Аляксандр Іосіфавіч Бяляўскі; born January 17, 1964) is a former Latvian/Soviet ice hockey player and captain of team Latvia, and current coach for the Latvia men's national ice hockey team. He played for two clubs for most of his player career Dinamo Riga where he started his professional career in 1985 and IF Björklöven. He was a prolific goal scorer and skilled playmaker.

Beļavskis has played for Latvia at the 2002 Winter Olympics.

== Career statistics ==
=== Regular season and playoffs ===
			Regular season					Playoffs
Season	Team	League	GP	G	A	Pts	PIM	GP	G	A	Pts	PIM
1981–82	Dinamo Rīga	URS	9	4	0	4	2	—	—	—	—	—
1981–82	Latvijas Berzs	URS.3	24	11	6	17	4	—	—	—	—	—
1982–83	Dinamo Rīga	URS	25	4	2	6	16	—	—	—	—	—
1982–83	Latvijas Berzs	URS.3	12	14	3	17	10	—	—	—	—	—
1983–84	Dinamo Rīga	URS	9	0	1	1	6	—	—	—	—	—
1984–85	Dinamo Rīga	URS	40	3	7	10	12	—	—	—	—	—
1984–85	Latvijas Berzs	URS.3		8				—	—	—	—	—
1985–86	Dinamo Rīga	URS	40	14	10	24	22	—	—	—	—	—
1986–87	Dinamo Rīga	URS	33	10	4	14	16	—	—	—	—	—
1987–88	Dinamo Rīga	URS	49	13	12	25	30	—	—	—	—	—
1988–89	Dinamo Rīga	URS	40	19	15	34	33	—	—	—	—	—
1989–90	Dinamo Rīga	URS	48	13	18	31	16	—	—	—	—	—
1990–91	Dinamo Rīga	URS	46	16	26	42	42	—	—	—	—	—
1991–92	IF Björklöven	SWE.2	36	34	21	55	34	3	1	2	3	2
1992–93	IF Björklöven	SWE.2	36	28	37	65	44	9	4	2	6	10
1993–94	IF Björklöven	SEL	22	7	11	18	26	—	—	—	—	—
1993–94	IF Björklöven	Allsv	18	9	6	15	42	2	1	0	1	2
1994–95	Västra Frölunda HC	SEL	19	2	4	6	8	—	—	—	—	—
1994–95	Västra Frölunda HC	Allsv	10	3	7	10	2	5	0	1	1	0
1995–96	IF Björklöven	SWE.2	18	25	5	30	24	—	—	—	—	—
1995–96	IF Björklöven	Allsv	17	14	14	28	10	7	3	4	7	8
1996–97	IF Björklöven	SWE.2	26	19	16	35	59	10	9	4	13	4
1997–98	IF Björklöven	SWE.2	30	38	16	54	48	14	13	9	22	10
1998–99	IF Björklöven	SEL	46	10	17	27	45	—	—	—	—	—
1999–2000	IF Björklöven	Allsv	45	24	25	49	54	9	3	4	7	6
2000–01	IF Björklöven	SEL	48	21	19	40	104	—	—	—	—	—
2001–02	IF Björklöven	Allsv	46	28	44	72	90	8	6	7	13	8
2002–03	IF Björklöven	Allsv	8	5	1	6	6	—	—	—	—	—
URS totals			339	96	95	191	195	—	—	—	—	—
SWE.2 totals			146	144	95	239	209	36	27	17	44	26
SEL totals			135	40	51	91	183	—	—	—	—	—

=== International ===
Year	Team	Event	GP	G	A	Pts	PIM
1994	Latvia	WC B	7	6	5	11	4
1995	Latvia	WC B	7	9	6	15	12
1996	Latvia	WC B	7	3	3	6	29
1997	Latvia	WC	8	3	4	7	4
1998	Latvia	WC	6	1	1	2	20
1999	Latvia	WC	6	2	4	6	2
1999	Latvia	WC Q	3	1	1	2	0
2000	Latvia	WC	7	4	1	5	0
2001	Latvia	OGQ	3	1	3	4	2
2001	Latvia	WC	3	0	0	0	0
2002	Latvia	OG	4	1	1	2	4
2002	Latvia	WC	6	2	2	4	18
Senior totals			67	33	31	64	95
