= Thomas Ziegler (ice hockey) =

Swiss professional ice hockey player (born 1978)

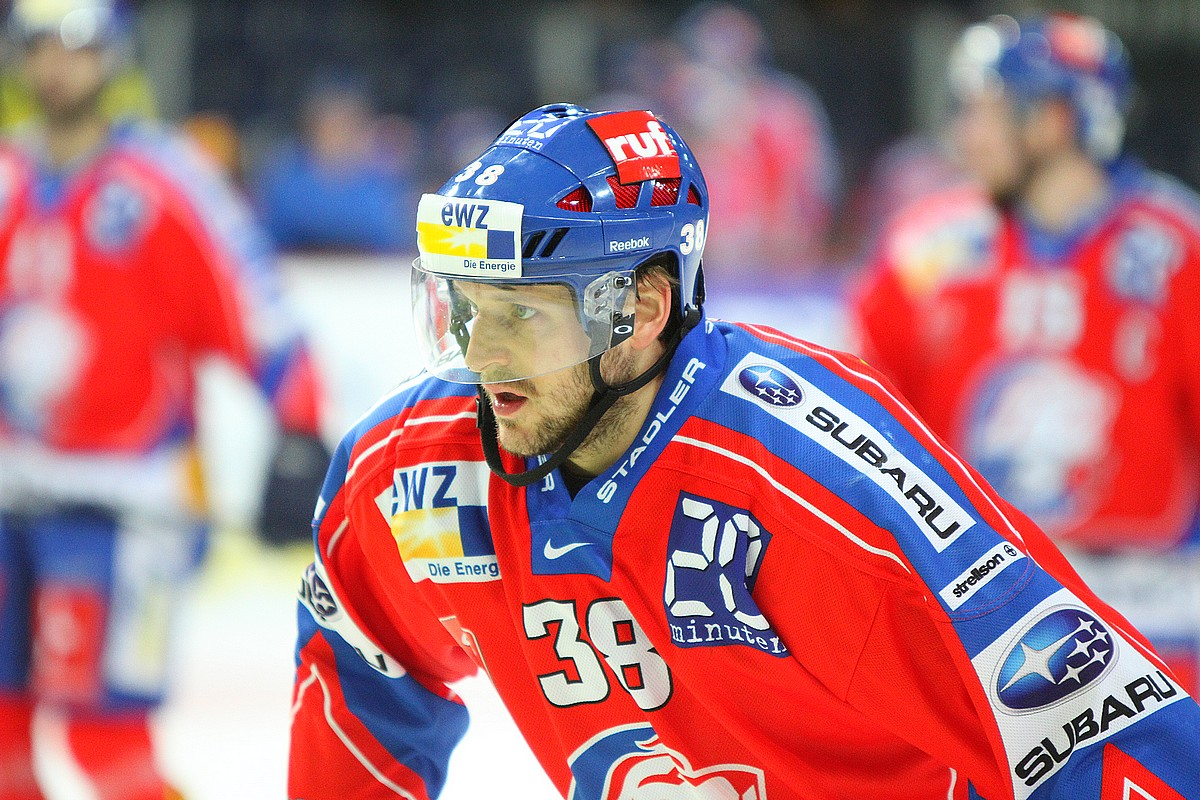
- Thomas Ziegler in 2010 with ZSC Lions
- Born: June 9, 1978 (age 48) Zürich, Switzerland
- Height: 5 ft 11 in (180 cm)
- Weight: 188 lb (85 kg; 13 st 6 lb)
- Position: Centre
- Shot: Left
- Played for: Tampa Bay Lightning; HC Ambri-Piotta; SC Bern
- National team: Switzerland
- NHL draft: 263rd overall, 2000; Tampa Bay Lightning
- Playing career: 1995–2012

Thomas Ziegler (born June 9, 1978) is a Swiss former professional ice hockey player.

== Biography ==
Ziegler was born in Zürich, Switzerland. As a youth, he played in the 1992 Quebec International Pee-Wee Hockey Tournament with a team from Zürich. He later played five games in the National Hockey League with the Tampa Bay Lightning during the 2000–01 NHL season, but did not score any points. He later won the National League A championship with SC Bern in the 2003–04 NLA season.

== Career statistics ==
=== Regular season and playoffs ===
			Regular season					Playoffs
Season	Team	League	GP	G	A	Pts	PIM	GP	G	A	Pts	PIM
1994–95	Grasshopper Club Zürich	SUI U20
1995–96	Grasshopper Club Zürich	SUI U20
1995–96	Grasshopper Club Zürich	SUI.2	10	0	0	0	0	—	—	—	—	—
1996–97	Grasshopper Club Zürich	SUI U20	34	19	11	30	107	—	—	—	—	—
1996–97	Grasshopper Club Zürich	SUI.2	11	0	1	1	2	—	—	—	—	—
1997–98	Grasshopper Club Zürich	SUI U20	13	9	3	12	32	—	—	—	—	—
1997–98	Grasshopper Club Zürich	SUI.2	25	5	4	9	22	—	—	—	—	—
1997–98	ZSC Lions	NDA	10	0	0	0	2	—	—	—	—	—
1997–98	SC Küsnacht	SUI.3
1998–99	HC Ambrì–Piotta	NDA	39	2	4	6	18	12	0	0	0	8
1998–99	HC Sierre	SUI.2	4	1	2	3	2	—	—	—	—	—
1999–2000	HC Ambrì–Piotta	NLA	45	7	7	14	24	9	1	5	6	16
2000–01	Tampa Bay Lightning	NHL	5	0	0	0	0	—	—	—	—	—
2000–01	Detroit Vipers	IHL	67	8	19	27	40	—	—	—	—	—
2001–02	Springfield Falcons	AHL	3	0	1	1	4	—	—	—	—	—
2001–02	SC Bern	NLA	26	3	5	8	24	6	0	0	0	8
2002–03	SC Bern	NLA	38	4	16	20	63	12	2	4	6	35
2003–04	SC Bern	NLA	46	12	22	34	109	15	1	5	6	16
2004–05	SC Bern	NLA	32	4	9	13	59	11	1	0	1	12
2005–06	SC Bern	NLA	39	5	12	17	103	6	0	0	0	4
2006–07	SC Bern	NLA	41	4	11	15	60	17	3	3	6	18
2007–08	SC Bern	NLA	47	4	11	15	28	6	1	0	1	16
2008–09	SC Bern	NLA	49	3	9	12	44	6	1	0	1	27
2009–10	SC Bern	NLA	10	1	1	2	12	11	0	4	4	4
2010–11	ZSC Lions	NLA	47	4	7	11	83	5	0	1	1	2
2011–12	ZSC Lions	NLA	36	0	2	2	10	6	0	0	0	0
NDA/NLA totals			505	53	116	169	639	122	10	21	31	166
NHL totals			5	0	0	0	0	—	—	—	—	—

=== International ===
Year	Team	Event	GP	G	A	Pts	PIM
1996	Switzerland	EJC	5	0	2	2	4
1998	Switzerland	WJC	7	3	1	4	2
2000	Switzerland	WC	7	2	2	4	0
2001	Switzerland	WC	6	0	1	1	4
2002	Switzerland	WC	6	0	0	0	2
2004	Switzerland	WC	7	1	3	4	20
2005	Switzerland	OGQ	3	2	0	2	4
2005	Switzerland	WC	6	1	0	1	10
2006	Switzerland	OG	5	1	0	1	8
2008	Switzerland	WC	7	0	0	0	4
2009	Switzerland	WC	6	0	0	0	4
Junior totals			12	3	3	6	6
Senior totals			53	7	6	13	56
