= Sergei Zholtok =

Latvian ice hockey player (1972–2004)

- Žoltoks with Latvia
- Born: December 2, 1972 Riga, Latvian SSR, Soviet Union
- Died: November 3, 2004 (aged 31) Minsk, Belarus
- Height: 6 ft 0 in (183 cm)
- Weight: 185 lb (84 kg; 13 st 3 lb)
- Position: Centre
- Shot: Right
- Played for: Dinamo Riga; Boston Bruins; Ottawa Senators; Montreal Canadiens; Edmonton Oilers; Minnesota Wild; Nashville Predators; Riga 2000
- National team: Latvia
- NHL draft: 55th overall, 1992; Boston Bruins
- Playing career: 1990–2004
Medal record
Ice hockey
Representing Soviet Union
World Junior Championships
Silver medal – second place	1991 Canada
Representing CIS
World Junior Championships
Gold medal – first place	1992 Germany

Sergei Zholtok (Russian: Сергей Жолток), also known as Sergejs Žoltoks (December 2, 1972 – November 3, 2004) was a Latvian professional ice hockey centre. He played ten seasons in the National Hockey League (NHL) for the Boston Bruins, Ottawa Senators, Montreal Canadiens, Edmonton Oilers, Minnesota Wild and Nashville Predators from 1993 to 2004.

== Playing career ==
Žoltoks was drafted 55th overall by the Boston Bruins in the 1992 NHL entry draft. Prior to being drafted, he won a gold medal with USSR national team in IIHF Junior World Championships in 1992. After playing 25 games with the Boston Bruins in the 1992–93 NHL season and the 1993–94 NHL season, Žoltoks spent the next years playing in minor leagues.

Žoltoks returned to the NHL in the 1996–97 NHL season with the Ottawa Senators. In the following years, he played for the Montreal Canadiens, Edmonton Oilers, Minnesota Wild and the Nashville Predators.

During the 2004–05 NHL lockout, Žoltoks returned to Latvia and played for Riga 2000 team of the Latvian Hockey Higher League and the Belarusian Extraleague.

=== Death ===
On November 3, 2004, his cardiac arrhythmia resurfaced during the game between Riga 2000 and Dinamo Minsk. Žoltoks left the game with five minutes remaining, collapsing and dying after returning to the dressing room in the arms of teammate Darby Hendrickson. An autopsy determined heart failure as the cause of death. He was survived by his wife, Anna, and two sons. This was not the first occurrence; in January 2003, he had to leave the game due to arrhythmia, and had been observed in a hospital overnight. He was allowed to return to playing after missing seven games.

During his ten seasons in the NHL, he played in 588 regular season games, scored 111 goals and had 147 assists.

== Awards and achievements ==
- 1994: AHL Player of the Week (Dec. 11)
- 1996: Ironman Award, International Hockey League, given to a player who has played in every game for his team and displayed outstanding offensive and defensive skills.
- 2005: Riga Secondary School No. 55 was named in honour of Sergejs Žoltoks.

== Career statistics ==
=== Regular season and playoffs ===
			Regular season					Playoffs
Season	Team	League	GP	G	A	Pts	PIM	GP	G	A	Pts	PIM
1989–90	RASMS Rīga	USSR-3	—	—	—	—	—	—	—	—	—	—
1990–91	Dinamo Rīga	USSR	39	4	0	4	16	—	—	—	—	—
1991–92	Stars Rīga	CIS	27	6	3	9	6	—	—	—	—	—
1992–93	Boston Bruins	NHL	1	0	1	1	0	—	—	—	—	—
1992–93	Providence Bruins	AHL	64	31	35	66	57	6	3	5	8	4
1993–94	Boston Bruins	NHL	24	2	1	3	2	—	—	—	—	—
1993–94	Providence Bruins	AHL	54	29	33	62	16	—	—	—	—	—
1994–95	Providence Bruins	AHL	78	23	35	58	42	13	8	5	13	6
1995–96	Las Vegas Thunder	IHL	82	51	50	101	30	15	7	13	20	6
1996–97	Ottawa Senators	NHL	57	12	16	28	19	7	1	1	2	0
1996–97	Las Vegas Thunder	IHL	19	13	14	27	20	—	—	—	—	—
1997–98	Ottawa Senators	NHL	78	10	13	23	16	11	0	2	2	0
1998–99	Montreal Canadiens	NHL	70	7	15	22	6	—	—	—	—	—
1998–99	Fredericton Canadiens	AHL	7	3	4	7	0	—	—	—	—	—
1999–00	Montreal Canadiens	NHL	68	26	12	38	28	—	—	—	—	—
1999–00	Quebec Citadelles	AHL	1	0	1	1	2	—	—	—	—	—
2000–01	Montreal Canadiens	NHL	32	1	10	11	8	—	—	—	—	—
2000–01	Edmonton Oilers	NHL	37	4	16	20	22	3	0	0	0	0
2001–02	Minnesota Wild	NHL	73	19	20	39	28	—	—	—	—	—
2002–03	Minnesota Wild	NHL	78	16	26	42	18	18	2	11	13	0
2003–04	Minnesota Wild	NHL	59	13	16	29	19	—	—	—	—	—
2003–04	Nashville Predators	NHL	11	1	1	2	0	6	1	0	1	0
2004–05	HK Rīga 2000	BLR	6	4	3	7	12	—	—	—	—	—
NHL totals			588	111	147	258	166	45	4	14	18	0

=== International ===
Year	Team	Event	GP	G	A	Pts	PIM
1990	Soviet Union	EJC	6	6	4	10	6
1991	Soviet Union	WJC	7	2	2	4	2
1992	CIS	WJC	7	2	4	6	6
1994	Latvia	WC B	4	6	1	7	4
1997	Latvia	WC	5	3	3	6	2
1999	Latvia	WC	6	4	0	4	4
2001	Latvia	WC	6	5	1	6	4
2002	Latvia	WC	6	0	4	4	2
2004	Latvia	WC	7	3	2	5	10
Junior totals			20	10	10	20	14
Senior totals			30	15	10	25	22

== See also ==
- List of ice hockey players who died during their playing career

Preceded by Matt Johnson	Minnesota Wild captain January 2003	Succeeded by Brad Bombardir
