= Leonīds Vedējs =

Latvian ice hockey player (1908–1995)

- Born: October 12, 1908 Daugavpils, Russian Empire
- Died: February 4, 1995 (aged 86) Grand Rapids, Michigan, United States
- Position: Defence
- Played for: US Riga (Latvian); Dinamo Riga (Latvian)
- National team: Latvia
- Playing career: 1931–1947

Leonīds Janis Vedējs (October 12, 1908 – February 4, 1995) was a Latvian ice hockey defenceman. He played with the Latvia men's national ice hockey team at the 1936 Winter Olympics held in Garmisch-Partenkirchen, Germany. He was the flag bearer of the Latvian delegation at the opening ceremony as well as the captain of the hockey team.
