= Michal Sýkora =

Czech ice hockey player

- Born: 5 July 1973 (age 52); Pardubice, Czechoslovakia
- Height: 6 ft 5 in (196 cm)
- Weight: 233 lb (106 kg; 16 st 9 lb)
- Position: Defense
- Shot: Left
- Played for: San Jose Sharks; Chicago Blackhawks; Tampa Bay Lightning; Philadelphia Flyers
- National team: Czech Republic
- NHL draft: 123rd overall, 1992; San Jose Sharks
- Playing career: 1993–2005

Michal Sýkora (born 5 July 1973) is a Czech former professional ice hockey defenseman who played in the National Hockey League (NHL) for the San Jose Sharks, Chicago Blackhawks, Tampa Bay Lightning and Philadelphia Flyers. He is not related to the NHL hockey player Petr Sýkora who played with the New Jersey Devils in the 2011-12 season. He is the older brother to Petr Sýkora, who played 12 NHL games.

== Playing career ==
Sýkora started his NHL career with the San Jose Sharks in 1993–94. He joined the Chicago Blackhawks for the 1996–97 season and played in 28 games. He recorded a respectable +/- of 4 and scored 1 goal. Sýkora could not reprise these statistics with the Blackhawks. He recorded a +/- of -10 in the same number of games in the 1997–98 season. He was traded to the Tampa Bay Lightning for Mark Fitzpatrick and a 4th-round draft choice in 1999. Sýkora signed as a free agent with Philadelphia for the 2000–01 season, leaving the NHL after that season.

== Career statistics ==
=== Regular season and playoffs ===
			Regular season					Playoffs
Season	Team	League	GP	G	A	Pts	PIM	GP	G	A	Pts	PIM
1990–91	TJ Tesla Pardubice	TCH U20	40	17	26	43	45	—	—	—	—	—
1990–91	TJ Tesla Pardubice	TCH	2	0	0	0	0	—	—	—	—	—
1991–92	Tacoma Rockets	WHL	61	13	23	36	66	4	0	2	2	2
1992–93	Tacoma Rockets	WHL	70	23	50	73	73	7	4	8	12	2
1993–94	Kansas City Blades	IHL	47	5	11	16	30	—	—	—	—	—
1993–94	San Jose Sharks	NHL	22	1	4	5	14	—	—	—	—	—
1994–95	Kansas City Blades	IHL	36	1	10	11	30	—	—	—	—	—
1994–95	San Jose Sharks	NHL	16	0	4	4	10	—	—	—	—	—
1995–96	San Jose Sharks	NHL	79	4	16	20	54	—	—	—	—	—
1996–97	San Jose Sharks	NHL	35	2	5	7	59	—	—	—	—	—
1996–97	Chicago Blackhawks	NHL	28	1	9	10	10	1	0	0	0	0
1997–98	Indianapolis Ice	IHL	6	0	0	0	4	—	—	—	—	—
1997–98	HC IPB Pojišťovna Pardubice	ELH	1	0	1	1	2	—	—	—	—	—
1997–98	Chicago Blackhawks	NHL	28	1	3	4	12	—	—	—	—	—
1998–99	HC Sparta Praha	ELH	26	4	9	13	38	8	2	0	2	0
1998–99	Tampa Bay Lightning	NHL	10	1	2	3	0	—	—	—	—	—
1999–2000	HC Sparta Praha	ELH	48	11	14	25	89	9	5	3	8	8
2000–01	Philadelphia Flyers	NHL	49	5	11	16	26	6	0	1	1	0
2001–02	HC IPB Pojišťovna Pardubice	ELH	49	7	11	18	111	6	2	2	4	26
2002–03	HC ČSOB Pojišťovna Pardubice	ELH	45	6	17	23	58	8	4	5	9	6
2003–04	HC Moeller Pardubice	ELH	45	11	14	25	26	7	1	3	4	8
2004–05	HC Moeller Pardubice	ELH	2	0	1	1	2	—	—	—	—	—
NHL totals			267	15	54	69	185	7	0	1	1	0
ELH totals			214	40	66	106	320	38	14	13	27	60

=== International ===
Year	Team	Event	GP	G	A	Pts	PIM
1991	Czechoslovakia	EJC	5	0	0	0	0
1996	Czech Republic	WC	8	0	1	1	6
1996	Czech Republic	WCH	3	0	0	0	2
2000	Czech Republic	WC	9	5	3	8	16
2002	Czech Republic	OG	1	0	0	0	0
2002	Czech Republic	WC	7	1	2	3	12
Senior totals			28	6	6	12	36

== Awards ==
- WHL West First All-Star Team – 1993
