= Herberts Vasiļjevs =

Latvian ice hockey player (born 1976)

Herberts Vasiljevs
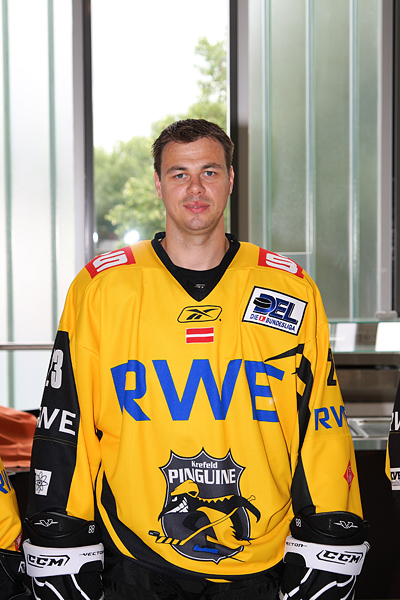
- Born: 27 May 1976 (age 50) Riga, Latvian SSR, Soviet Union
- Height: 5 ft 11 in (180 cm)
- Weight: 185 lb (84 kg; 13 st 3 lb)
- Position: Right wing
- Shot: Right
- Played for: Krefeld Pinguine; Florida Panthers; Atlanta Thrashers; Vancouver Canucks; Amur Khabarovsk; Nürnberg Ice Tigers
- National team: Latvia
- NHL draft: Undrafted
- Playing career: 1994–2017

Herberts Vasiļjevs (born 27 May 1976) is a Latvian Commentator in Channel LTV7 in hockey games and retired Latvian professional ice hockey center and right winger. He played in 51 NHL contests and spent more than ten years in the German DEL with Krefeld Pinguine. He also represented the Latvian national teams at three Olympic Games.

== Playing career ==
Herberts Vasiļjevs is a son of Haralds Vasiļjevs, a well-known Latvian ice hockey player and coach, who coached the Latvian national ice hockey team from 1999 to 2001. He grew up in Latvia, but came to Germany in the early 1990s when his father accepted the player-coach position of the senior team at ERC Westfalen 90 Dortmund. Herberts played in the junior team of Dortmund. His father later moved on to coach the junior team of Krefeld Pinguine of the German DEL (Deutsche Eishockey League).

After playing the 1994/95 season for Krefeld Pinguine, Herberts Vasiļjevs moved to North America where he played junior and minor league hockey. He was then signed by the Florida Panthers of NHL as a free agent in 1998.

Vasiļjevs was one of three Latvian players who have reached NHL without ever being drafted in an NHL Entry Draft (the other two were Pēteris Skudra and Raitis Ivanāns). From 1998 to 2002, Vasiļjevs played 51 NHL games with the Florida Panthers, Atlanta Thrashers and Vancouver Canucks, scoring 8 goals and 7 assists. After spending the entire 2002–03 season with Vancouver Canucks' minor league affiliate, Manitoba Moose of the AHL, Vasiļjevs was not re-signed by the Canucks.

He continued his career in the Russian Superleague and the DEL. In 2005, he returned to the Krefeld Pinguine organization, the team where he started his professional hockey career 11 years earlier. In the summer of 2010, after long negotiations, Vasiļjevs re-signed a new contract with Krefeld up until 2013.

On 21 May 2015 Vasiljevs consolidated his status amongst Krefeld's history in agreeing to a one-year extension to return for an 11th season with the Pinguine. He announced his retirement on 26 February 2017.

== Career statistics ==
=== Regular season and playoffs ===
			Regular season					Playoffs
Season	Team	League	GP	G	A	Pts	PIM	GP	G	A	Pts	PIM
1994–95	Krefelder EV 1981	DEL	42	4	5	9	24	15	1	4	5	10
1995–96	Guelph Storm	OHL	65	34	33	67	63	16	6	13	19	6
1996–97	Carolina Monarchs	AHL	54	13	18	31	30	—	—	—	—	—
1996–97	Port Huron Border Cats	CoHL	3	3	2	5	4	—	—	—	—	—
1997–98	Beast of New Haven	AHL	76	36	30	66	60	3	1	0	1	2
1998–99	Florida Panthers	NHL	5	0	0	0	2	—	—	—	—	—
1998–99	Kentucky Thoroughblades	AHL	76	28	48	76	66	12	2	1	3	4
1999–2000	Atlanta Thrashers	NHL	7	1	0	1	4	—	—	—	—	—
1999–2000	Orlando Solar Bears	IHL	73	25	35	60	60	6	2	2	4	6
2000–01	Orlando Solar Bears	IHL	58	22	26	48	32	12	8	3	11	14
2000–01	Atlanta Thrashers	NHL	21	4	5	9	14	—	—	—	—	—
2001–02	Vancouver Canucks	NHL	18	3	2	5	2	—	—	—	—	—
2001–02	Manitoba Moose	AHL	31	12	14	26	10	—	—	—	—	—
2002–03	Manitoba Moose	AHL	69	10	29	39	30	14	3	5	8	8
2003–04	Amur Khabarovsk	RSL	37	4	7	11	38	—	—	—	—	—
2004–05	Nürnberg Ice Tigers	DEL	39	15	23	38	40	6	1	2	3	6
2005–06	Krefeld Pinguine	DEL	50	24	21	45	67	5	2	3	5	4
2006–07	Krefeld Pinguine	DEL	51	30	24	54	78	2	1	2	3	0
2007–08	Krefeld Pinguine	DEL	53	24	33	57	54	—	—	—	—	—
2008–09	Krefeld Pinguine	DEL	52	20	35	55	40	7	3	1	4	2
2009–10	Krefeld Pinguine	DEL	51	22	36	58	92	—	—	—	—	—
2010–11	Krefeld Pinguine	DEL	52	16	33	49	38	8	6	3	9	32
2011–12	Krefeld Pinguine	DEL	26	4	9	13	20	—	—	—	—	—
2012–13	Krefeld Pinguine	DEL	50	18	29	47	87	9	8	2	10	10
2013–14	Krefeld Pinguine	DEL	11	3	4	7	8	5	2	2	4	0
2014–15	Krefeld Pinguine	DEL	46	7	16	23	47	—	—	—	—	—
2015–16	Krefeld Pinguine	DEL	52	12	28	40	28	—	—	—	—	—
2016–17	Krefeld Pinguine	DEL	52	4	9	13	26	—	—	—	—	—
DEL totals			627	203	305	508	649	57	24	19	43	64
AHL totals			306	99	139	238	196	29	6	6	12	14
NHL totals			51	8	7	15	22	—	—	—	—	—

=== International ===
Year	Team	Event	GP	G	A	Pts	PIM
1998	Latvia	WC	6	0	2	2	4
2000	Latvia	WC	1	0	0	0	4
2004	Latvia	WC	7	0	1	1	0
2005	Latvia	WC	6	0	0	0	0
2006	Latvia	OG	4	1	0	1	4
2006	Latvia	WC	6	1	0	1	10
2007	Latvia	WC	6	2	3	5	8
2008	Latvia	WC	6	2	1	3	10
2009	Latvia	OGQ	3	1	1	2	4
2009	Latvia	WC	7	3	6	9	6
2010	Latvia	OG	4	1	1	2	6
2010	Latvia	WC	6	0	3	3	8
2011	Latvia	WC	6	1	1	2	6
2014	Latvia	OG	3	1	0	1	0
2014	Latvia	WC	7	1	2	3	4
Senior totals			75	13	20	33	70
