= Waltteri Immonen =

Finnish ice hockey player

- Born: April 3, 1967 (age 57); Helsinki, FIN
- Height: 5 ft 8 in (173 cm)
- Weight: 171 lb (78 kg; 12 st 3 lb)
- Position: Defence
- Shot: Left
- Played for: Jokerit
- National team: Finland
- Playing career: 1987–1999

Waltteri Immonen (born April 3, 1967 in Helsinki, Finland) is a retired professional ice hockey defenseman and former coach of SM-liiga team Jokerit.

== Playing career ==
Immonen started his playing career in Helsingin Jokerit, an ice hockey team from Helsinki. Immonen played his first full season for Jokerit during the 1988–89 1. division league of ice hockey in Finland. Immonen led the defense of Jokerit and played alongside players like Teemu Selänne, Ari Sulander, Mika Strömberg. During the 1994–95 NHL lockout, he was joined by NHL-star Jari Kurri and, for the second time, Teemu Selänne. Immonen was appointed as the captain of Jokerit in the beginning of 1991–92 SM-liiga season by then head coach Boris Majorov. Immonen won the SM-liiga 4 times as the captain of Jokerit. He also won the 1995 European Cup with Jokerit. Immonen retired after 1998–99 SM-liiga season. Immonen's playing number 24 is currently retired by Jokerit in honour of his services as the longtime captain of the team.

== Career statistics ==
			Regular season					Playoffs
Season	Team	League	GP	G	A	Pts	PIM	GP	G	A	Pts	PIM
1987–88	Jokerit	I-Divisioona	15	0	0	0	0	—	—	—	—	—
1988–89	Jokerit	I-Divisioona	44	4	24	28	8	—	—	—	—	—
1989–90	Jokerit	Liiga	44	1	14	15	8	—	—	—	—	—
1990–91	Jokerit	Liiga	43	2	8	10	8	—	—	—	—	—
1991–92	Jokerit	Liiga	44	3	11	14	2	10	3	4	7	4
1992–93	Jokerit	Liiga	48	3	15	18	10	3	0	1	1	0
1993–94	Jokerit	Liiga	45	5	16	21	14	12	1	4	5	4
1994–95	Jokerit	Liiga	50	6	18	24	16	4	0	0	0	0
1995–96	Jokerit	Liiga	50	5	21	26	10	11	1	3	4	2
1996–97	Jokerit	Liiga	49	4	11	15	14	9	0	3	3	2
1997–98	Jokerit	Liiga	26	3	4	7	6	8	0	0	0	0
1998–99	Jokerit	Liiga	53	0	5	5	4	3	0	0	0	0
Liiga totals			452	32	123	155	92	60	5	15	20	12

== Coaching career ==
After retiring, Immonen became the team manager of Jokerit and, after Hannu Jortikka left, Immonen was named the new head coach of Jokerit. After a poor start, Immonen was fired from his position but remained in the club in the role of coach. Immonen was part of the Jokerit coaching staff until 2008, when he followed the departing Doug Shedden to Nationalliga A team EV Zug where he started out as an assistant coach to Shedden.

Preceded by Jere Lehtinen	Winner of the Raimo Kilpiö trophy 1995–96	Succeeded by Kimmo Rintanen
Preceded by Anssi Melametsä	Captain of Jokerit; 1991–1999	Succeeded by Antti-Jussi Niemi
Preceded by Hannu Jortikka	Head Coach of Jokerit; 2005	Succeeded by Curt Lindström
