= Petr Buzek =

Czech ice hockey player (born 1977)

- Born: April 26, 1977 (age 49) Jihlava, Czechoslovakia
- Height: 6 ft 1 in (185 cm)
- Weight: 202 lb (92 kg; 14 st 6 lb)
- Position: Defence
- Shot: Left
- Played for: HC Dukla Jihlava; Dallas Stars; Atlanta Thrashers; Calgary Flames; HC Sparta Praha; HC Litvínov; HC Slovan Bratislava
- National team: Czech Republic
- NHL draft: 63rd overall, 1995; Dallas Stars
- Playing career: 1994–2005

Petr Buzek (born April 26, 1977) is a Czech former ice hockey defenceman. He was drafted in the third round, 63rd overall, by the Dallas Stars in the 1995 NHL entry draft. After five seasons in the NHL, he returned to the Czech Extraliga in 2003 until his retirement in 2005.

== Playing career ==
Prior to his selection at the 1995 NHL entry draft, Buzek was involved in a serious car collision in 1995 after falling asleep at the wheel and colliding with a tree. He broke both his legs, nose and wrist, shattered his right kneecap, fractured his left cheekbone and cracked his forehead. After numerous operations, he had a metal plate and ten screws inserted into his left leg, a plate and seven screws inserted into right ankle, two screws in his right knee and two screws in his left wrist. The accident dropped his stock considerably as he was projected as a top 10 pick, before he was drafted in the third round by the Dallas Stars.

Buzek played three seasons with the Michigan K-Wings of the International Hockey League, during which he also appeared in four games with the Stars. Buzek joined the Atlanta Thrashers in the 1999 NHL Expansion Draft, and was named to the 2000 All-Star Game as the Thrashers' first-ever representative.

Despite his success in their inaugural season, Buzek appeared in only 14 more games with the Thrashers in the next two seasons before being traded to the Calgary Flames, along with a draft pick, in exchange for Jeff Cowan and Kurtis Foster. Buzek appeared in 76 games in a season and a half with the Flames.

Buzek returned to the Czech Republic for the 2003–04 season, playing for HC Sparta Praha. The next season, he played for HC Jihlava and then moved to HC Litvínov before moving to the Slovak Extraliga to play for HC Slovan Bratislava. On October 18, 2005, Buzek announced his retirement from hockey, citing personal reasons for his decision.

== Career statistics ==
=== Regular season and playoffs ===
			Regular season					Playoffs
Season	Team	League	GP	G	A	Pts	PIM	GP	G	A	Pts	PIM
1993–94	ASD Dukla Jihlava	ELH	3	0	0	0	2	—	—	—	—	—
1994–95	HC Dukla Jihlava	ELH	43	2	5	7	47	—	—	—	—	—
1996–97	Michigan K-Wings	IHL	67	4	6	10	48	—	—	—	—	—
1997–98	Michigan K-Wings	IHL	60	10	15	25	58	2	0	1	1	17
1997–98	Dallas Stars	NHL	2	0	0	0	2	—	—	—	—	—
1998–99	Michigan K-Wings	IHL	74	5	14	19	68	5	0	0	0	10
1998–99	Dallas Stars	NHL	2	0	0	0	2	—	—	—	—	—
1999–2000	Atlanta Thrashers	NHL	63	5	14	19	41	—	—	—	—	—
2000–01	Atlanta Thrashers	NHL	5	0	0	0	8	—	—	—	—	—
2001–02	Chicago Wolves	AHL	4	0	1	1	2	—	—	—	—	—
2001–02	Atlanta Thrashers	NHL	9	0	0	0	13	—	—	—	—	—
2001–02	Calgary Flames	NHL	32	1	3	4	14	—	—	—	—	—
2002–03	Calgary Flames	NHL	44	3	5	8	14	—	—	—	—	—
2003–04	HC Sparta Praha	ELH	5	0	0	0	10	—	—	—	—	—
2004–05	HC Dukla Jihlava	ELH	34	0	2	2	38	—	—	—	—	—
2004–05	HC Chemopetrol, a.s.	ELH	7	0	2	2	6	—	—	—	—	—
2005–06	HC Slovan Bratislava	SVK	12	0	0	0	28	—	—	—	—	—
ELH totals			92	2	9	11	103	—	—	—	—	—
IHL totals			201	19	35	54	174	7	0	1	1	27
NHL totals			157	9	22	31	94	—	—	—	—	—

=== International ===
Medal record

Representing Czech Republic

Ice hockey

World Championships
Gold medal – first place	2000 Russia	

Year	Team	Event	Result	GP	G	A	Pts	PIM
1994	Czech Republic	EJC18	3rd place, bronze medalist(s)	5	0	0	0	4
1995	Czech Republic	EJC18	5th	5	2	2	4	10
1995	Czech Republic	WJC	6th	7	2	2	4	10
2000	Czech Republic	WC	1st place, gold medalist(s)	9	1	3	4	24
Junior totals				17	4	4	8	24
Senior totals				9	1	3	4	24

== Awards and honours ==
Award	Year
NHL
All-Star Game	2000
