= Dinamo Riga (original) =

Latvian ice hockey club

- City: Riga, Latvia
- League: SCL (1978–1992); IHL (1992–1995)
- Founded: 1946
- Folded: 1995
- Home arena: Rīgas Sporta pils
- Colors: Red, white, blue

Franchise history
- Dinamo Riga: 1946–1949
- Daugava Riga: 1949–1967
- Dinamo Riga: 1967–1991
- Stars Rīga: 1991–1992
- Pārdaugava Rīga: 1993–1995

Dinamo Riga (Latvian: Rīgas Dinamo) was a Soviet ice hockey club, based in Riga, Latvia. It was founded in 1946 and disestablished in 1995 as Pārdaugava Rīga. From 1949 to 1963 Dinamo Riga was joined with Daugava sports society which was sponsored by Riga's factories VEF and then RVR.

== History of Dinamo Riga ==
Dinamo Riga was established in 1946, after the re-occupation of Latvia by the Soviet Union. It was a part of Dynamo sports society sponsored by the Soviet Ministry of Interior and the national security structures including the KGB. The club was one of the 12 teams which participated in the first Soviet championship in the 1946–47 season. The team's first official game was a victory 5–1 against Dinamo Tallinn in December 1946. The first season was considered as a success, as the team finished the tournament in fourth place. The club's first roster mainly consisted from the players of the interwar Latvian national team.

At first the club had no permanent place, where the home games were held, but since the 1950–51 season, Dinamo started to play home games at Daugava Stadium, but the games still were played on a natural ice rink and the go ahead of the games depended on suitable weather, The situation did not change until the 1960–61 season, when the stadium was heavily reconstructed.

Dinamo Riga changed its name to Daugava Riga before the start of the 1949–50 season, and kept it for a decade, before the team changed its name again. In the mid-fifties, the core of the team-players, which started their careers before the Second World War, started to retire, and the team started to slip further down the table as the years went by.

The club again changed its name and since the 1958–59 season and now was known as RVR Riga, but the name did not last long as the club two years later was renamed once again to Daugava (RVR). The name changes did not help the team's cause and the club slipped to the third division. During the sixties, the club adopted a new player and staff recruiting policy, switching from local talent developing to gathering players from all corners of Soviet Union and even abroad. The club again changed owners and the name of Dinamo Riga was restored before the 1967–68 season, which ended as the worst season in the club's entire history.

In the 1987–88 season, Dinamo Riga had their best finish, losing to CSKA Moscow in the final.

In 1975, Viktor Khatulev of Dinamo Rīga became the first ice hockey player from the Soviet Union drafted by the National Hockey League. He never had a chance to play for the NHL, as Soviet players were not allowed to play for foreign teams. In season 1976–77, Dinamo Rīga star Helmuts Balderis was the leading scorer, had the most goals, and won the best player of the season award (MVP). He was also the goal leader in 1975–76 and the leading scorer in 1983. He scored 333 goals in his Soviet Union League career.

After the end of Soviet Union, the team continued to play until 1995 as a member of the International Hockey League, the successor of the Soviet Hockey League. During this period, the team was called Stars Rīga and later, Pārdaugava Rīga. It was the former team of the Aleksey Nikiforov, coach of many future NHLers.

As of April 7, 2008, the club has been re-established as a member of the Kontinental Hockey League. See Dinamo Riga.

== Super Series ==
Dinamo Riga has also participated in the Super Series in exhibition games against NHL teams in year 1989 and 1990. Dinamo Riga Super Series record:

Super Series game log

1988–89 Super Series: 2–4–1
#	Date	Visitor	Score	Home	OT	Decision	Attendance	Record	Recap
1	27 December 1988	Dinamo Riga	2–2	Calgary Flames		Irbe	—	0–0–1
2	28 December 1988	Dinamo Riga	1–2	Edmonton Oilers		Irbe	—	0–1–1
3	30 December 1988	Dinamo Riga	1–6	Vancouver Canucks		Irbe	—	0–2–1
4	31 December 1988	Dinamo Riga	5–3	Los Angeles Kings		Irbe	—	1–2–1
5	4 January 1989	Dinamo Riga	1–4	Chicago Blackhawks		Irbe	—	1–3–1
6	5 January 1989	Dinamo Riga	0–5	St. Louis Blues		Irbe	—	1–4–1
7	7 January 1989	Dinamo Riga	2–1	Minnesota North Stars		Irbe	—	2–4–1

1989–90 Super Series: 0–1–0
#	Date	Visitor	Score	Home	OT	Decision	Attendance	Record	Recap
1	19 September 1989	Washington Capitals	2–1	Dinamo Riga	OT	Irbe	5,000	0–1–0

1990–91 Super Series: 0–1–0
#	Date	Visitor	Score	Home	OT	Decision	Attendance	Record	Recap
1	14 September 1990	Montreal Canadiens	4–2	Dinamo Riga		Irbe	5,000	0–1–0

Legend: Win Loss Tie

== Season-by-season record ==
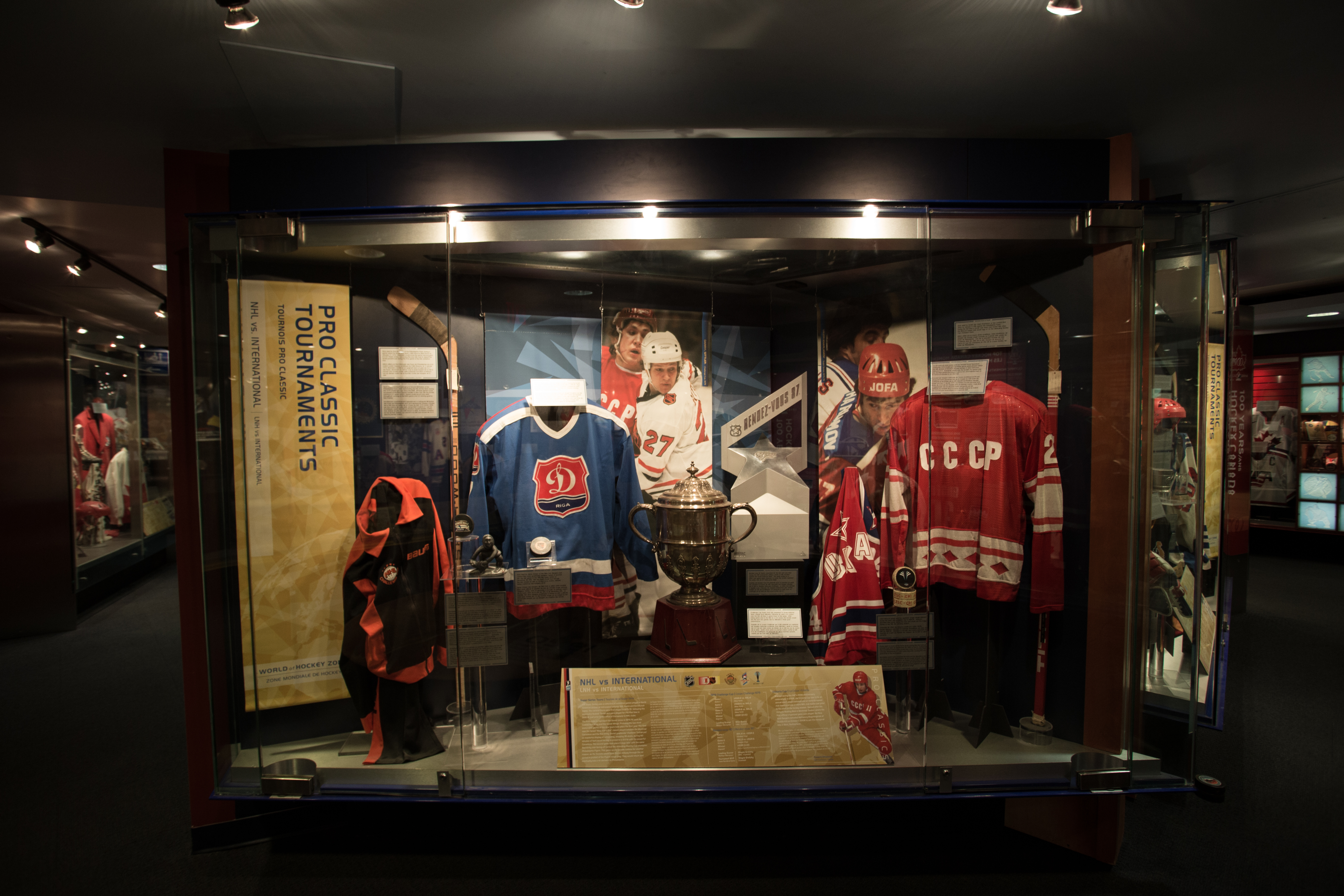
Dinamo Riga jersey in Hockey Hall of Fame

Note: GP = Games played, W = Wins, L = Losses, T = Ties, Pts = Points, GF = Goals for, GA = Goals against, PIM = Penalties in minutes

Season	GP	W	L	T	Pts	GF	GA	Finish	Playoffs
1978–79	44	19	18	7	45	150	132	6th	Not held
1979–80	44	16	24	4	36	134	162	8th	Not held
1980–81	49	22	21	6	50	163	157	5th	Not held
1981–82	56	17	33	6	40	202	234	8th	Not held
1982–83	56	27	24	5	59	240	212	5th	Not held
1983–84	44	17	19	8	42	146	172	8th	Not held
1984–85	52	18	25	9	45	170	196	7th	Not held
1985–86	40	19	15	6	44	138	128	5th	Not held
1986–87	40	14	21	5	33	117	132	7th	Not held
1987–88	18	11	3	4	25	66	46	3rd	Lost in Final
1988–89	44	18	20	6	42	115	131	6th	Not held
1989–90	48	26	15	7	59	148	117	5th	Not held
1990–91	46	25	16	5	55	187	138	5th	Not held

Notes:

- The player statistics for the 1987–88 season are the total for both stages.
- Soviet league had no playoffs, except for the 1987–88 season.

== Notable players ==
=== IIHF Hall of Fame ===
Players

- Helmuts Balderis, RW, 1967–1977, 1980–1985, inducted 1998
- Artūrs Irbe, G, 1987–1991, inducted 2010

Builders

- Viktor Tikhonov, Coach, 1968–1977 inducted 1998

=== List of Dynamo Riga players selected in the NHL Amateur Draft ===
- 1975: Viktors Hatuļevs (160th overall)

=== List of Dynamo Riga players selected in the NHL entry draft ===
- 1988: Harijs Vītoliņš (188th overall)
- 1989: Artūrs Irbe (196th overall), Helmut Balderis (238th overall)
- 1991: Sandis Ozoliņš (30th overall)
- 1992: Sergejs Žoltoks (55th overall), Grigorijs Panteļejevs (136th overall), Viktors Ignatjevs (243rd overall)
- 1993: Aleksandrs Kerčs (60th overall)

=== Stanley Cup winners ===
Players

- Sandis Ozoliņš, D, 1990–1992, won 1996

=== Olympic champions ===
Players

- Vitālijs Samoilovs, G, 1982–1989, champion in 1988

=== World champions ===
Players

- Helmuts Balderis, RW, 1967–1977, 1980–1985 champion in 1976, 1977, 1983
- Artūrs Irbe, G, 1986–1991, champion in 1989, 1990

=== World Junior champions ===
Players

- Anatolijs Antipovs, C, 1978–1981, champion in 1979
- Sergejs Gapejenko, F, 1984–1987, champion in 1986
- Vladimirs Golovkovs, F, 1978–1985, champion in 1979, 1980
- Viktors Hatuļevs, D/LW, 1973–1981, champion in 1974, 1975
- Andrejs Maticins, D. 1981–1990, champion in 1983
- Sandis Ozoliņš, D, 1990–1992, champion in 1992
- Mihails Šostaks, C, 1975–1988, champion in 1976, 1977
- Edmunds Vasiļjevs, F, 1969–1982, champion in 1974
- Germans Volgins, F, 1981–1983, champion in 1983
- Sergejs Žoltoks, C, 1990–1992, champion in 1992

=== Head coaches ===
- Jānis Dobelis, 1946–1949
- Edgars Klāvs, 1949–1961
- Anatolijs Jegorovs, 1961–1962
- Georgijs Firsovs, 1962–1963
- Staņislavs Motls, 1967–1968
- Viktor Tikhonov, 1968–1977
- Ēvalds Grabovskis, 1977–1980
- Vladimir Yurzinov, 1980–1989
- Ēvalds Grabovskis, 1989–1991
- Jevgeņijs Banovs, 1992
- Juris Reps, 1992–1994
- Mihails Beskašnovs, 1994–1995
- Leonīds Beresņevs, 1995

=== Awards and trophies ===
Pervaya Liga

- 1972–73

Soviet MVP

- Helmuts Balderis: 1976–77

Scoring champion

- Helmuts Balderis: 1976–77, 1982–83

Goal scoring champion

- Helmuts Balderis: 1975–76, 1976–77, 1984–85
- Alexei Frolikov: 1982–83

Soviet / Russian League First Team

- Helmuts Balderis: 1976–77

Best Rookie

- Artūrs Irbe: 1987–88
- Sandis Ozoliņš: 1990–91

== See also ==
- FC Daugava Riga

== Citations and references ==
=== Cited sources ===
- Ulmanis, Aivis (1998). Melnās ripas bruņinieki: Latvijas hokeja vēsture. Latvijas Hokeja federācija. ISBN 9984-19-017-X.
