= Waltteri Ruuskanen =

Finnish ice hockey defenceman

- Born: July 23, 1997 (age 27); Kuopio, Finland
- Height: 6 ft 4 in (193 cm)
- Weight: 194 lb (88 kg; 13 st 12 lb)
- Position: Defence
- Shoots: Right
- team Former teams: Free agent KalPa; Pelicans
- Playing career: 2016–present

Waltteri Ruuskanen (born July 23, 1997) is a Finnish professional ice hockey defenceman. He is currently a free agent, having last played for SaPKo of Mestis.

Ruuskanen began his career with KalPa, playing in their junior teams before making his Liiga debut with the team during 2015–16 season. He went on to play seven games in Liiga with the team before joined SaPKo in 2017. During the 2017–18 season, Ruuskanen played six games for Lahti Pelicans on loan.
