= Miroslav Hlinka =

- Born: 31 August 1972 Trenčín, Czechoslovakia
- Died: 14 September 2014 (aged 42) Banská Bystrica, Slovakia
- Position: Forward
- Played for: HC Karlovy Vary; HC Dynamo Moscow; Modo Hockey; Jokerit; HK Dukla Trenčín
- National team: Czech Republic and Slovakia
- Playing career: 1990–2014

Miroslav Hlinka (31 August 1972 – 14 September 2014) was a Slovak professional ice hockey player and assistant coach.

He played both for Czech and Slovak national ice hockey team. He won the 2002 Men's World Ice Hockey Championships with Slovak national ice hockey team.

== Personal life and death ==
He was the cousin of Czech national team player Jaroslav Hlinka and the son of former player Miroslav Hlinka sr.

On 14 September 2014 he died by hanging in a hotel in Banská Bystrica. He is survived by his wife, his son Michal and his daughter Vanesa.

== Career statistics ==
=== Regular season and playoffs ===
			Regular season					Playoffs
Season	Team	League	GP	G	A	Pts	PIM	GP	G	A	Pts	PIM
1990–91	ASVŠ Dukla Trenčín	TCH	6	1	1	2	0	2	0	0	0	0
1991–92	ASVŠ Dukla Trenčín	TCH	18	1	5	6	6	—	—	—	—	—
1992–93	ASVŠ Dukla Trenčín	TCH	48	8	17	25	—	—	—	—	—	—
1993–94	HC Dukla Trenčín	SVK	35	4	7	11	—	—	—	—	—	—
1994–95	HC Sparta Praha	ELH	43	11	24	35	98	—	—	—	—	—
1995–96	HC Sparta Praha	ELH	28	3	8	11	58	7	3	1	4	4
1996–97	HC Sparta Praha	ELH	42	8	22	30	65	8	0	1	1	6
1997–98	HC Sparta Praha	ELH	51	10	22	32	84	11	2	2	4	6
1998–99	HC Sparta Praha	ELH	48	7	25	32	81	8	0	5	5	8
1999–2000	Jokerit	Liiga	26	5	10	15	24	11	2	5	7	8
1999–2000	HC Slovan Bratislava	SVK	21	6	14	20	22	—	—	—	—	—
2000–01	HC Becherovka Karlovy Vary	ELH	32	6	5	11	80	—	—	—	—	—
2001–02	Modo Hockey	SEL	45	6	9	15	69	14	5	8	13	24
2002–03	Modo Hockey	SEL	41	5	12	17	67	2	0	0	0	0
2003–04	Dynamo Moscow	RSL	17	0	3	3	16	—	—	—	—	—
2003–04	HC Hamé Zlín	ELH	13	2	4	6	26	17	0	4	4	16
2004–05	HC Dukla Trenčín	SVK	33	6	6	12	36	—	—	—	—	—
2004–05	MsHK Žilina	SVK	16	3	3	6	18	5	1	2	3	34
2005–06	HC Moeller Pardubice	ELH	52	13	16	29	67	—	—	—	—	—
2006–07	HC Moeller Pardubice	ELH	49	10	12	22	62	18	2	5	7	20
2007–08	HC Moeller Pardubice	ELH	33	5	7	12	55	—	—	—	—	—
2007–08	HC Sparta Praha	ELH	6	2	0	2	6	4	0	0	0	8
2008–09	KLH Chomutov	CZE II	25	8	20	28	28	10	3	5	8	14
2009–10	HC ’05 Banská Bystrica	SVK	32	5	17	22	96	6	1	1	2	2
2010–11	HC ’05 Banská Bystrica	SVK	34	7	8	15	49	14	1	6	7	41
2011–12	HK AutoFinance Poprad	SVK	10	0	2	2	2	—	—	—	—	—
2011–12	HC ’05 Banská Bystrica	SVK	11	2	5	7	42	5	0	1	1	6
2013–14	HK Trnava	SVK II	36	6	16	22	52	—	—	—	—	—
2013–14	MHK Dubnica nad Váhom	SVK III	19	6	10	16	16	—	—	—	—	—
SVK totals			192	33	62	95	265	30	3	10	13	83
ELH totals			397	77	145	222	682	78	9	21	30	78

=== International ===
Year	Team	Event	GP	G	A	Pts	PIM
2000	Slovakia	WC	9	2	2	4	14
2001	Slovakia	WC	7	1	1	2	8
2002	Slovakia	WC	9	1	1	2	6
2003	Slovakia	WC	9	2	3	5	8
2004	Slovakia	WCH	2	0	0	0	2
Senior totals			36	6	7	13	38
