= Haralds Vasiļjevs =

Latvian ice hockey player and coach (1952–2024)

- Born: 11 February 1952; Riga, Latvian SSR, USSR
- Died: 23 October 2024 (aged 72)
- Position: Winger
- Shot: Left
- Played for: Dinamo Riga
- Playing career: 1968–1983

Haralds Vasiļjevs (11 February 1952 – 23 October 2024) was a Latvian professional ice hockey coach and player. He was the head coach of the youth programs for the Graz 99ers. He was a past national team head coach. He played for Dinamo Riga in the USSR Championship.

== Coaching career ==
Vasiļjevs started coaching with an internship with Dinamo Riga after completing the Russian hockey coaching school after being deemed to have the highest qualification to coach necessary. He then had an internship with his original coach Viktor Tikhonov. From 1985 to 1990, he was the head coach of RASMS Riga, the Dinamo Riga farm club. In 1990, he took the head coaching job at EHC Dortmund and through 1994 brought the team up from the Landesliga to the 2nd Bundesliga.

From 1994 to 2001, Vasiļjevs held various coaching positions in the Krefeld Pinguine organisation, including head coach of the club's Junior team in the Deutsche Nachwuchs-Liga. In 2000, he received the highest approval from the Deutscher Eishockey-Bund and received his Level A Head Coach license. He was the assistant coach of the Krefeld from 1998 to 2001. He was the head coach of the Pinguine until 2004.

He was later the head coach of HK Riga 2000.

=== Latvian national team ===
Vasiļjevs was coach of the Latvia men's national ice hockey team from 1999 to 2001 and coached in 34 games. He won two tournaments as the head coach: the 1999 World Cup of Hockey qualifier held in Sheffield, England and the Olympic Qualification that was held in Klagenfurt, Austria. Under his tutelage, the Latvians best finish at the World Championships was 8th place in 2000.

== Personal life and death ==
Vasiļjevs's son, Herberts, was also a professional ice hockey player.

Vasiļjevs died on 23 October 2024, at the age of 72.
