= Tomáš Vlasák =

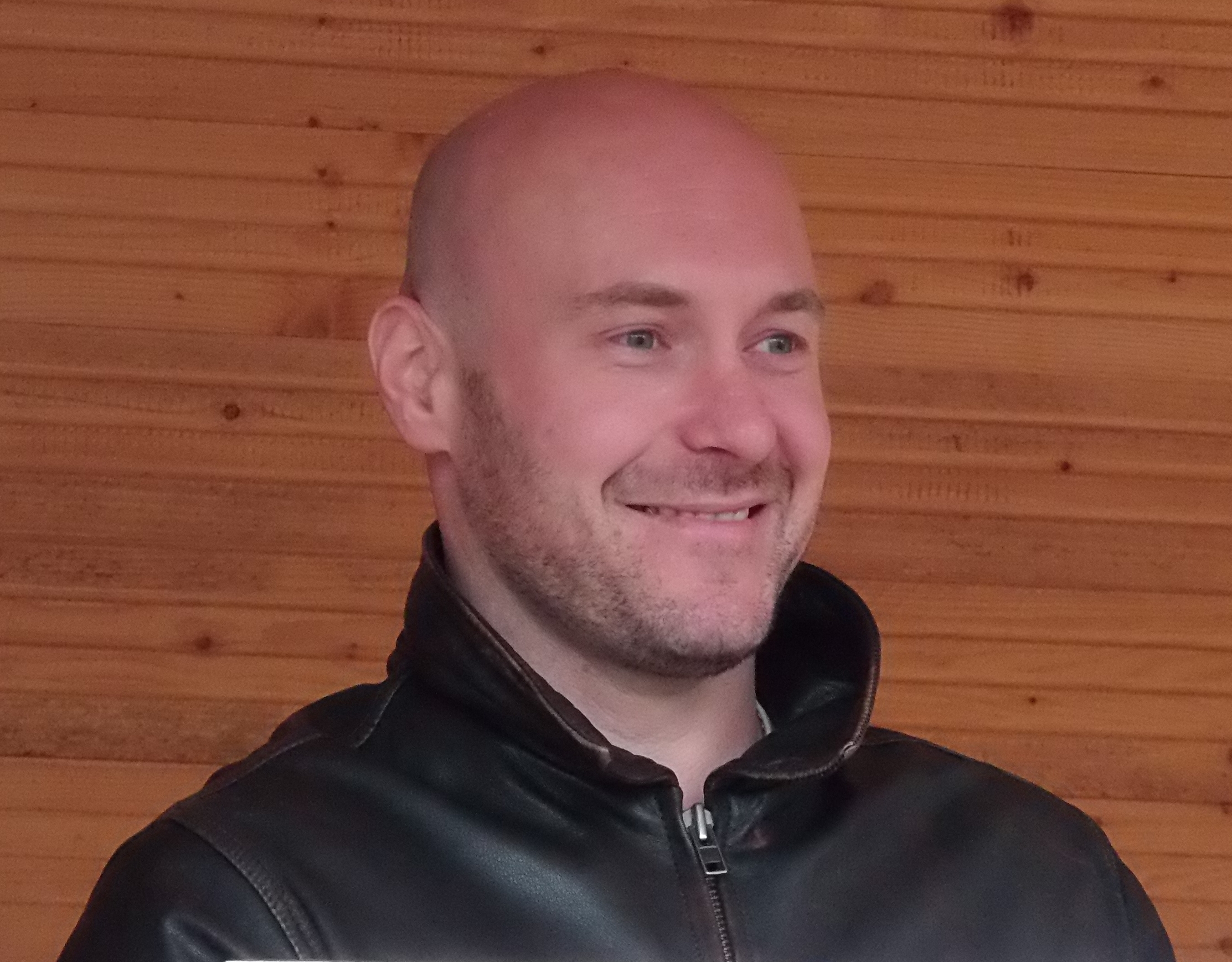
- Born: 1 February 1975 (age 50); Prague, Czechoslovakia
- Height: 5 ft 10 in (178 cm)
- Weight: 175 lb (79 kg; 12 st 7 lb)
- Position: Centre
- Shot: Right
- Played for: HC Chemopetrol Litvínov; HPK; Los Angeles Kings; HC Ambrì-Piotta; Avangard Omsk; Ak Bars Kazan; HC Slavia Praha; Linköping HC; HC Lasselsberger Plzeň
- National team: Czech Republic
- NHL draft: 120th overall, 1993; Los Angeles Kings
- Playing career: 1993–2015

Tomáš Vlasák (born 1 February 1975) is a Czech former professional hockey player who plays for the Plzeň HC in the Czech Extraliga. He played 10 games with the Los Angeles Kings during the 2000-2001 season.

== Career statistics ==
=== Regular season and playoffs ===
			Regular season					Playoffs
Season	Team	League	GP	G	A	Pts	PIM	GP	G	A	Pts	PIM
1991–92	TJ Slavia IPS Praha	CSR–2	—	—	—	—	—	—	—	—	—	—
1992–93	TJ Slavia IPS Praha	CSR–2	31	17	7	24	—	—	—	—	—	—
1993–94	HC Chemopetrol Litvínov	CZE	42	16	13	29	9	4	0	0	0	0
1994–95	HC Litvínov	CZE	35	6	14	20	6	4	0	0	0	4
1995–96	HC Litvínov	CZE	35	11	22	33	24	15	4	5	9	4
1996–97	HC Chemopetrol	CZE	51	25	33	58	16	—	—	—	—	—
1997–98	HC Chemopetrol	CZE	51	23	22	45	36	4	1	2	3	0
1998–99	HPK	SM-l	54	28	29	57	36	8	2	9	11	0
1999–00	HPK	SM-l	48	24	39	63	63	8	3	4	7	6
2000–01	Los Angeles Kings	NHL	10	1	3	4	2	—	—	—	—	—
2000–01	Lowell Lock Monsters	AHL	5	0	1	1	5	—	—	—	—	—
2000–01	HPK	SM-l	27	6	12	18	10	—	—	—	—	—
2001–02	HC Ambrì–Piotta	NLA	42	21	22	43	19	4	1	2	3	2
2002–03	Avangard Omsk	RSL	48	19	27	46	42	12	1	6	7	6
2003–04	Avangard Omsk	RSL	60	13	31	44	47	10	0	1	1	10
2004–05	Ak Bars Kazan	RSL	3	0	0	0	0	—	—	—	—	—
2004–05	HC Slavia Praha	CZE	44	15	17	32	6	7	4	4	8	2
2005–06	HC Slavia Praha	CZE	46	15	24	39	36	15	7	8	15	4
2006–07	HC Slavia Praha	CZE	32	14	10	24	28	—	—	—	—	—
2006–07	Linköping HC	SEL	22	7	8	15	4	15	5	4	9	4
2007–08	HC Lasselsberger Plzeň	CZE	52	16	14	30	30	4	2	4	6	4
2008–09	HC Lasselsberger Plzeň	CZE	52	27	31	58	62	17	7	13	20	2
2009–10	HC Plzeň 1929	CZE	51	19	33	52	49	6	6	3	9	2
2010–11	HC Plzeň 1929	CZE	52	30	38	68	26	4	2	5	7	8
2011–12	HC Plzeň 1929	CZE	18	7	8	15	4	10	1	4	5	18
2012–13	HC Škoda Plzeň	CZE	45	17	35	52	12	20	3	6	9	8
2013–14	HC Škoda Plzeň	CZE	47	10	18	28	30	6	1	0	1	4
2014–15	HC Slavia Praha	CZE	40	10	13	23	28	—	—	—	—	—
CZE totals			693	261	345	606	402	116	38	54	92	60
NHL totals			10	1	3	4	2	—	—	—	—	—

=== International ===
Year	Team	Event	GP	G	A	Pts	PIM
1992	Czechoslovakia	EJC	5	2	3	5	2
1993	Czechoslovakia	EJC	6	5	7	12	8
1994	Czech Republic	WJC	7	3	1	4	2
1999	Czech Republic	WC	10	3	2	5	16
2000	Czech Republic	WC	9	4	5	9	0
2001	Czech Republic	WC	9	2	4	6	4
2002	Czech Republic	WC	7	3	3	6	0
2004	Czech Republic	WCH	2	0	1	1	0
Junior totals			18	10	11	21	12
Senior totals			37	12	15	27	20
