= Latvia men's national ice hockey team =

Men's national ice hockey team representing Latvia

Latvia
- Association: Latvian Ice Hockey Federation
- General manager: Rūdolfs Kalvītis
- Head coach: Harijs Vītoliņš
- Assistants: Lauris Dārziņš; Petteri Nummelin; Sandis Ozoliņš; Raimonds Vilkoits
- Captain: Rūdolfs Balcers
- Most games: Rodrigo Laviņš (230)
- Top scorer: Leonīds Tambijevs (69)
- Most points: Leonīds Tambijevs (153)
- Home stadium: Xiaomi Arēna
- Team colors
- IIHF code: LAT
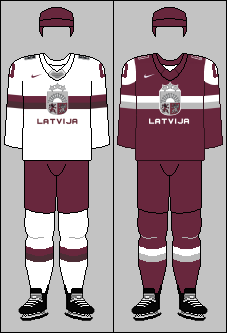

Ranking
- Current IIHF: 9 ▲1 (3 June 2026)
- Highest IIHF: 9 (2005–06, 2014, 2026–)
- Lowest IIHF: 13 (2018)

First international
- Latvia 3–0 Lithuania (Riga, Latvia; 27 February 1932)

Biggest win
- Latvia 32–0 Israel (Bled, Slovenia; 15 March 1993)

Biggest defeat
- Canada 14–0 Latvia (Davos, Switzerland; 20 January 1935)

Olympics
- Appearances: 7 (first in 1936)

IIHF World Championships
- Appearances: 37 (first in 1933)
- Best result: Bronze: (2023)

IIHF European Championships
- Appearances: 1

International record (W–L–T)
- 318–309–27

Medal record

World Championship
Bronze medal – third place	2023 Finland/Latvia	

The Latvian men's national ice hockey team represents Latvia in international ice hockey. The team is ranked 10th in the world by IIHF as of 2025 and is controlled by the Latvian Ice Hockey Federation. Their best ever finish at the World Championships was in 2023, when they won the bronze medal. They reached the quarterfinals at the 2014 Winter Olympics, losing 2–1 to Canada. Latvia has hosted the World Championships three times, in 2006, 2021 and 2023, and will host it in 2030.

There are 7,898 registered hockey players in Latvia, which is 0.43% of its population.

== Tournament record ==
=== Olympic Games ===
Games	GP	W	T		L	GF	GA	Coach	Captain	Finish
(Germany) 1936 Garmisch-Partenkirchen	3	0	0		3	3	27	Arvīds Jurgens	Leonīds Vedējs	13
1948–1988	As part of Soviet Union									
(France) 1992 Albertville	did not qualify									
(Norway) 1994 Lillehammer	did not qualify									
(Japan) 1998 Nagano	did not qualify									
(United States) 2002 Salt Lake City	4	2	1		1	20	14	Curt Lindström	Harijs Vītoliņš	9
(Italy) 2006 Turin	5	0	1		4	11	29	Leonīds Beresņevs	Kārlis Skrastiņš	12
(Canada) 2010 Vancouver	4	0	0	1	3	6	22	Oļegs Znaroks	Kārlis Skrastiņš	12
(Russia) 2014 Sochi	5	1	0	0	4	9	14	Ted Nolan	Sandis Ozoliņš	8
(South Korea) 2018 Pyeongchang	did not qualify									
(China) 2022 Beijing	4	0	0	0	4	7	14	Harijs Vītoliņš	Lauris Dārziņš	11
(Italy) 2026 Milan / Cortina d'Ampezzo	4	1	0	0	3	8	17	Harijs Vītoliņš	Kaspars Daugaviņš	10

=== World Championship ===
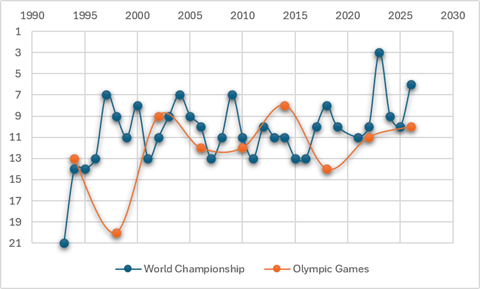
Graph shows Latvian results in IIHF World Championship since 1993.

Championships	GP	W	T	L	GF	GA	Coach	Captain	Finish
(Czechoslovakia) 1933 Prague	4	1	0	3	3	9	Nikolajs Kavass	Arvīds Jurgens	Finished in 10th place
(Switzerland) 1935 Davos	5	1	0	4	11	25	Nikolajs Kavass	Leonīds Vedējs	Finished in 13th place
(Czechoslovakia) 1938 Prague	4	1	0	3	4	8	Arvīds Jurgens	Leonīds Vedējs	Finished tied in 10th place
(Switzerland) 1939 Zürich/Basel	3	1	0	2	6	21	Larry Marsh	Leonīds Vedējs	Finished in 10th place
1954 – 1991	As part of Soviet Union								
(Slovenia) 1993 Bled/Ljubljana (Group C)	7	6	1	0	101	9	Helmuts Balderis	Konstantīns Grigorjevs	Finished in 21st place (Won Group C)
(Denmark) 1994 Copenhagen/Aalborg (Group B)	7	6	0	1	61	9	Helmuts Balderis	Konstantīns Grigorjevs	Finished in 14th place (2nd in Group B)
(Slovakia) 1995 Bratislava (Group B)	7	6	0	1	65	16	Ēvalds Grabovskis	Aleksandrs Beļavskis	Finished in 14th place (2nd in Group B)
(Netherlands) 1996 Eindhoven (Group B)	7	6	1	0	41	16	Leonīds Beresņevs	Oleg Znarok	Finished in 13th place (Won Group B)
(Finland) 1997 Helsinki/Tampere/Turku	8	4	2	2	37	23	Leonīds Beresņevs	Normunds Sējējs	Finished in 7th place
(Switzerland) 1998 Zürich/Basel	6	3	1	2	21	18	Leonīds Beresņevs	Oleg Znarok	Finished in 9th place
(Norway) 1999 Oslo/Hamar/Lillehammer	6	2	0	4	24	22	Leonīds Beresņevs	Oleg Znarok	Finished in 11th place
(Russia) 2000 Saint Petersburg	7	3	1	3	15	17	Haralds Vasiļjevs	Harijs Vītoliņš	Finished in 8th place
(Germany) 2001 Nuremberg/Cologne/Hanover	6	3	1	2	19	13	Haralds Vasiļjevs	Harijs Vītoliņš	Finished in 13th place
(Sweden) 2002 Gothenburg/Karlstad/Jönköping	6	1	0	5	11	18	Curt Lindström	Harijs Vītoliņš	Finished in 11th place
(Finland) 2003 Helsinki/Tampere/Turku	6	3	0	3	14	16	Curt Lindström	Harijs Vītoliņš	Finished in 9th place
(Czech Republic) 2004 Prague/Ostrava	7	2	2	3	12	14	Curt Lindström	Sergejs Žoltoks	Finished in 7th place
(Austria) 2005 Vienna/Innsbruck	6	2	1	3	10	21	Leonīds Beresņevs	Kārlis Skrastiņš	Finished in 9th place
(Latvia) 2006 Riga	6	2	1	3	12	24	Petr Vorobiev	Aleksandrs Semjonovs	Finished in 10th place

Championships	GP	W	OTW	OTL	L	GF	GA	Coach	Captain	Finish
(Russia) 2007 Moscow	6	2	0	1	3	20	22	Oleg Znarok	Rodrigo Laviņš	Finished in 13th place
(Canada) 2008 Halifax/Quebec City	6	2	0	0	4	11	19	Oleg Znarok	Rodrigo Laviņš	Finished in 11th place
(Switzerland) 2009 Bern/Kloten	7	2	2	0	3	15	23	Oleg Znarok	Kārlis Skrastiņš	Finished in 7th place
(Germany) 2010 Cologne/Mannheim/Gelsenkirchen	6	2	0	0	4	15	18	Oleg Znarok	Herberts Vasiļjevs	Finished in 11th place
(Slovakia) 2011 Bratislava/Košice	6	2	0	2	2	18	19	Oleg Znarok	Herberts Vasiļjevs	Finished in 13th place
(Finland) (Sweden) 2012 Helsinki/Stockholm	7	2	0	0	5	11	19	Ted Nolan	Jānis Sprukts	Finished in 10th place
(Sweden) (Finland) 2013 Stockholm/Helsinki	7	2	0	1	4	14	25	Ted Nolan	Lauris Dārziņš	Finished in 11th place
(Belarus) 2014 Minsk	7	3	0	0	4	20	24	Ted Nolan	Herberts Vasiļjevs	Finished in 11th place
(Czech Republic) 2015 Prague/Ostrava	7	0	2	1	4	11	25	Aleksandrs Beļavskis	Kaspars Daugaviņš	Finished in 13th place
(Russia) 2016 Moscow/Saint Petersburg	7	1	0	3	3	13	22	Leonīds Beresņevs	Kaspars Daugaviņš	Finished in 13th place
(Germany) (France) 2017 Cologne/Paris	7	3	0	1	3	14	18	Bob Hartley	Kaspars Daugaviņš	Finished in 10th place
(Denmark) 2018 Copenhagen/Herning	8	3	1	2	2	18	19	Bob Hartley	Roberts Bukarts	Finished in 8th place
(Slovakia) 2019 Bratislava/Košice	7	3	0	0	4	21	20	Bob Hartley	Lauris Dārziņš	Finished in 10th place
2020	Cancelled due to the coronavirus pandemic									
(Latvia) 2021 Riga	7	2	0	3	2	15	16	Bob Hartley	Lauris Dārziņš	Finished in 11th place
(Finland) 2022 Helsinki/Tampere	7	2	1	0	4	14	20	Harijs Vītoliņš	Rodrigo Ābols	Finished in 10th place
(Finland) (Latvia) 2023 Tampere/Riga	10	4	3	0	3	30	25	Harijs Vītoliņš	Kaspars Daugaviņš	Finished in 3rd place
(Czech Republic) 2024 Prague/Ostrava	7	1	3	0	3	19	29	Harijs Vītoliņš	Kaspars Daugaviņš	Finished in 9th place
(Sweden) (Denmark) 2025 Stockholm/Herning	7	3	0	0	4	17	25	Harijs Vītoliņš	Kaspars Daugaviņš	Finished in 10th place
(Switzerland) 2026 Zurich/Fribourg	8	4	0	0	4	24	19	Harijs Vītoliņš	Rūdolfs Balcers	Finished in 6th place
(Germany) 2027 Düsseldorf/Mannheim/Gelsenkirchen										

=== European Championship ===
Games	GP	W	T	L	GF	GA	Coach	Captain	Finish	Rank
(Germany) 1932 Berlin	4	1	0	3	5	13	Nikolajs Kavass	Arvīds Jurgens	Consolation Round	8th

== Team ==
=== Current roster ===
Roster for the 2026 IIHF World Championship.

Head coach: Harijs Vītoliņš

No.	Pos.	Name	Height	Weight	Birthdate	Team
3	D	Alberts Šmits	1.91 m (6 ft 3 in)	93 kg (205 lb)	2 December 2007 (age 18)	(Finland) Mikkelin Jukurit
4	D	Kristofers Bindulis	1.90 m (6 ft 3 in)	86 kg (190 lb)	18 September 1995 (age 31)	(Slovakia) HK Dukla Michalovce
5	D	Artūrs Andžāns	1.90 m (6 ft 3 in)	90 kg (200 lb)	21 August 2001 (age 25)	(Finland) HPK
9	F	Renārs Krastenbergs	1.83 m (6 ft 0 in)	84 kg (185 lb)	26 December 1998 (age 27)	(Czech Republic) HC Olomouc
12	F	Gļebs Prohorenkovs	1.86 m (6 ft 1 in)	80 kg (180 lb)	12 November 2001 (age 24)	(United States) Niagara Purple Eagles
14	F	Olivers Mūrnieks	1.86 m (6 ft 1 in)	90 kg (200 lb)	31 July 2008 (age 18)	(Canada) Saint John Sea Dogs
17	F	Mārtiņš Dzierkals	1.83 m (6 ft 0 in)	84 kg (185 lb)	4 April 1997 (age 29)	(Czech Republic) HC Sparta Praha
21	F	Rūdolfs Balcers – C	1.80 m (5 ft 11 in)	79 kg (174 lb)	8 April 1997 (age 29)	(Switzerland) ZSC Lions
22	F	Toms Andersons	1.85 m (6 ft 1 in)	86 kg (190 lb)	25 November 1993 (age 32)	(Switzerland) HC La Chaux-de-Fonds
23	F	Sandis Vilmanis	1.85 m (6 ft 1 in)	87 kg (192 lb)	23 January 2004 (age 22)	(United States) Florida Panthers
27	D	Oskars Cibuļskis	1.88 m (6 ft 2 in)	96 kg (212 lb)	9 April 1988 (age 38)	(Denmark) Herning Blue Fox
29	D	Ralfs Freibergs – A	1.81 m (5 ft 11 in)	84 kg (185 lb)	17 May 1991 (age 35)	(Czech Republic) Mountfield HK
34	F	Eduards Tralmaks	1.91 m (6 ft 3 in)	85 kg (187 lb)	17 February 1997 (age 29)	(United States) Grand Rapids Griffins
37	F	Oskars Lapinskis	1.77 m (5 ft 10 in)	75 kg (165 lb)	3 May 2002 (age 24)	(Switzerland) SCL Tigers
40	G	Mareks Mitens	1.85 m (6 ft 1 in)	80 kg (180 lb)	29 January 1998 (age 28)	(Slovakia) HC Banská Bystrica
42	D	Miks Tumānovs	1.95 m (6 ft 5 in)	83 kg (183 lb)	7 August 2001 (age 25)	(Finland) Jokerit
50	G	Kristers Gudļevskis	1.92 m (6 ft 4 in)	97 kg (214 lb)	31 July 1992 (age 34)	(Germany) Fischtown Pinguins
55	D	Roberts Mamčics	1.96 m (6 ft 5 in)	105 kg (231 lb)	6 April 1995 (age 31)	(Czech Republic) Energie Karlovy Vary
73	F	Deniss Smirnovs	1.77 m (5 ft 10 in)	80 kg (180 lb)	7 March 1999 (age 27)	(Switzerland) EHC Kloten
77	D	Kristaps Zīle – A	1.85 m (6 ft 1 in)	86 kg (190 lb)	24 December 1997 (age 28)	(Czech Republic) HC Bílí Tygři Liberec
87	F	Kristaps Skrastiņš	1.78 m (5 ft 10 in)	77 kg (170 lb)	20 November 2001 (age 24)	(United States) New Hampshire Wildcats
88	G	Gustavs Grigals	1.88 m (6 ft 2 in)	89 kg (196 lb)	22 July 1998 (age 28)	(Finland) SaiPa
89	F	Filips Buncis	1.90 m (6 ft 3 in)	93 kg (205 lb)	12 June 1997 (age 29)	(Denmark) Rungsted Ishockey Klub
95	F	Oskars Batņa	1.95 m (6 ft 5 in)	106 kg (234 lb)	7 May 1995 (age 31)	(Finland) Lahti Pelicans
97	F	Haralds Egle	1.80 m (5 ft 11 in)	95 kg (209 lb)	11 May 1996 (age 30)	(Czech Republic) Energie Karlovy Vary

=== 2026 Olympics roster ===
The first six players of Latvia's roster were announced on 16 June 2025. The remaining roster was named on 6 January 2026. On 12 January, forward Eriks Mateiko was ruled out for the remainder of the season and Olympics after his Achilles tendon was accidentally cut by a skate blade during a Hershey Bears game; he was replaced on the roster by Anrī Ravinskis. On 18 January, forward Rodrigo Ābols was ruled out after suffering a lower-body injury the previous day, and was replaced by Rihards Bukarts. On 10 February, Kaspars Daugaviņš was named Latvia's captain, with Uvis Balinskis and Zemgus Girgensons serving as alternate captains.

Head coach: Harijs Vītoliņš

No.	Pos.	Name	Height	Weight	Birthdate	Team
3	D	Alberts Šmits	1.93 m (6 ft 4 in)	93 kg (205 lb)	2 December 2007 (aged 18)	(Finland) Jukurit
9	F	Renārs Krastenbergs	1.83 m (6 ft 0 in)	87 kg (192 lb)	26 December 1998 (aged 27)	(Czech Republic) HC Olomouc
11	F	Dans Ločmelis	1.85 m (6 ft 1 in)	81 kg (179 lb)	21 January 2004 (aged 22)	(United States) Providence Bruins
13	F	Rihards Bukarts	1.80 m (5 ft 11 in)	84 kg (185 lb)	31 December 1995 (aged 30)	(Slovakia) HC Prešov
16	F	Kaspars Daugaviņš – C	1.83 m (6 ft 0 in)	102 kg (225 lb)	18 May 1988 (aged 37)	(Germany) Kassel Huskies
17	F	Mārtiņš Dzierkals	1.83 m (6 ft 0 in)	91 kg (201 lb)	4 April 1997 (aged 28)	(Czech Republic) Sparta Praha
21	F	Rūdolfs Balcers	1.80 m (5 ft 11 in)	80 kg (176 lb)	8 April 1997 (aged 28)	(Switzerland) ZSC Lions
22	F	Sandis Vilmanis	1.85 m (6 ft 1 in)	88 kg (194 lb)	23 January 2004 (aged 22)	(United States) Florida Panthers
23	F	Teodors Bļugers	1.85 m (6 ft 1 in)	86 kg (190 lb)	15 August 1994 (aged 31)	(Canada) Vancouver Canucks
26	D	Uvis Balinskis – A	1.85 m (6 ft 1 in)	90 kg (198 lb)	1 August 1996 (aged 29)	(United States) Florida Panthers
27	D	Oskars Cibuļskis	1.88 m (6 ft 2 in)	94 kg (207 lb)	9 April 1988 (aged 37)	(Denmark) Herning Blue Fox
28	F	Zemgus Girgensons – A	1.88 m (6 ft 2 in)	90 kg (198 lb)	5 January 1994 (aged 32)	(United States) Tampa Bay Lightning
29	D	Ralfs Freibergs	1.83 m (6 ft 0 in)	88 kg (194 lb)	17 May 1991 (aged 34)	(Czech Republic) Vítkovice Ridera
30	G	Elvis Merzļikins	1.91 m (6 ft 3 in)	90 kg (198 lb)	13 April 1994 (aged 31)	(United States) Columbus Blue Jackets
31	G	Artūrs Šilovs	1.93 m (6 ft 4 in)	93 kg (205 lb)	22 March 2001 (aged 24)	(United States) Pittsburgh Penguins
34	F	Eduards Tralmaks	1.93 m (6 ft 4 in)	100 kg (220 lb)	17 February 1997 (aged 28)	(United States) Grand Rapids Griffins
43	F	Anrī Ravinskis	1.93 m (6 ft 4 in)	94 kg (207 lb)	2 January 2003 (aged 23)	(Canada) Abbotsford Canucks
50	G	Kristers Gudļevskis	1.93 m (6 ft 4 in)	97 kg (214 lb)	31 July 1992 (aged 33)	(Germany) Fischtown Pinguins
55	D	Roberts Mamčics	1.98 m (6 ft 6 in)	104 kg (229 lb)	6 April 1995 (aged 30)	(Czech Republic) Energie Karlovy Vary
71	F	Roberts Bukarts	1.83 m (6 ft 0 in)	84 kg (185 lb)	27 June 1990 (aged 35)	(Slovakia) Dukla Trenčín
72	D	Jānis Jaks	1.83 m (6 ft 0 in)	89 kg (196 lb)	22 August 1995 (aged 30)	(Czech Republic) Energie Karlovy Vary
77	D	Kristaps Zīle	1.85 m (6 ft 1 in)	90 kg (198 lb)	24 December 1997 (aged 28)	(Czech Republic) Bílí Tygři Liberec
94	D	Kristiāns Rubīns	1.93 m (6 ft 4 in)	99 kg (218 lb)	11 December 1997 (aged 28)	(Czech Republic) Škoda Plzeň
95	F	Oskars Batņa	1.96 m (6 ft 5 in)	106 kg (234 lb)	7 May 1995 (aged 30)	(Finland) Pelicans
97	F	Haralds Egle	1.80 m (5 ft 11 in)	86 kg (190 lb)	11 May 1996 (aged 29)	(Czech Republic) Energie Karlovy Vary

=== Retired numbers ===
- 1 – Artūrs Irbe
- 7 – Kārlis Skrastiņš
- 19 – Helmuts Balderis
- 33 – Sergejs Žoltoks

=== Coaching history ===
	Coach	GP	W	T	L	GD	P-ts
1932–1935	(Latvia) Nikolajs Kavass	13	3	0	10	19:47	9
1936–1938	(Latvia) Arvīds Jurgens	7	1	0	6	7:35	3
1939	(Canada) Larry Marsh	3	1	0	2	6:21	3
1992–1994	(Latvia) Helmuts Balderis	14	12	1	1	162:18	27
1995	(Latvia) Ēvalds Grabovskis	7	6	0	1	65:16	18
1996–1999	(Latvia) Leonīds Beresņevs	27	15	4	8	123:79	49
1999–2001	(Latvia) Haralds Vasiļjevs	13	6	2	5	34:30	20
2001–2004	(Sweden) Curt Lindström	23	8	3	12	57:62	27
2005–2006	(Latvia) Leonīds Beresņevs	11	2	2	7	21:50	8
2006	(Russia) Petr Vorobiev	6	2	1	3	12:24	7
2007–2011	(Russia) Olegs Znaroks	35	16	–	19	85:123	37
2011–2014	(Canada) Ted Nolan	26	11	–	15	54:82	25
2015	(Latvia) Aleksandrs Beļavskis	7	2	–	5	11:25	5
2016	(Latvia) Leonīds Beresņevs	7	1	–	6	13:22	6
2016	(Latvia) Haralds Vasiļjevs	3	2	–	1	13:5	6
2017–2021	(Canada) Bob Hartley	29	12	–	17	68:73	41
2021–present	(Latvia) Harijs Vītoliņš	43	22	–	21	122:130	60

== All-time record ==
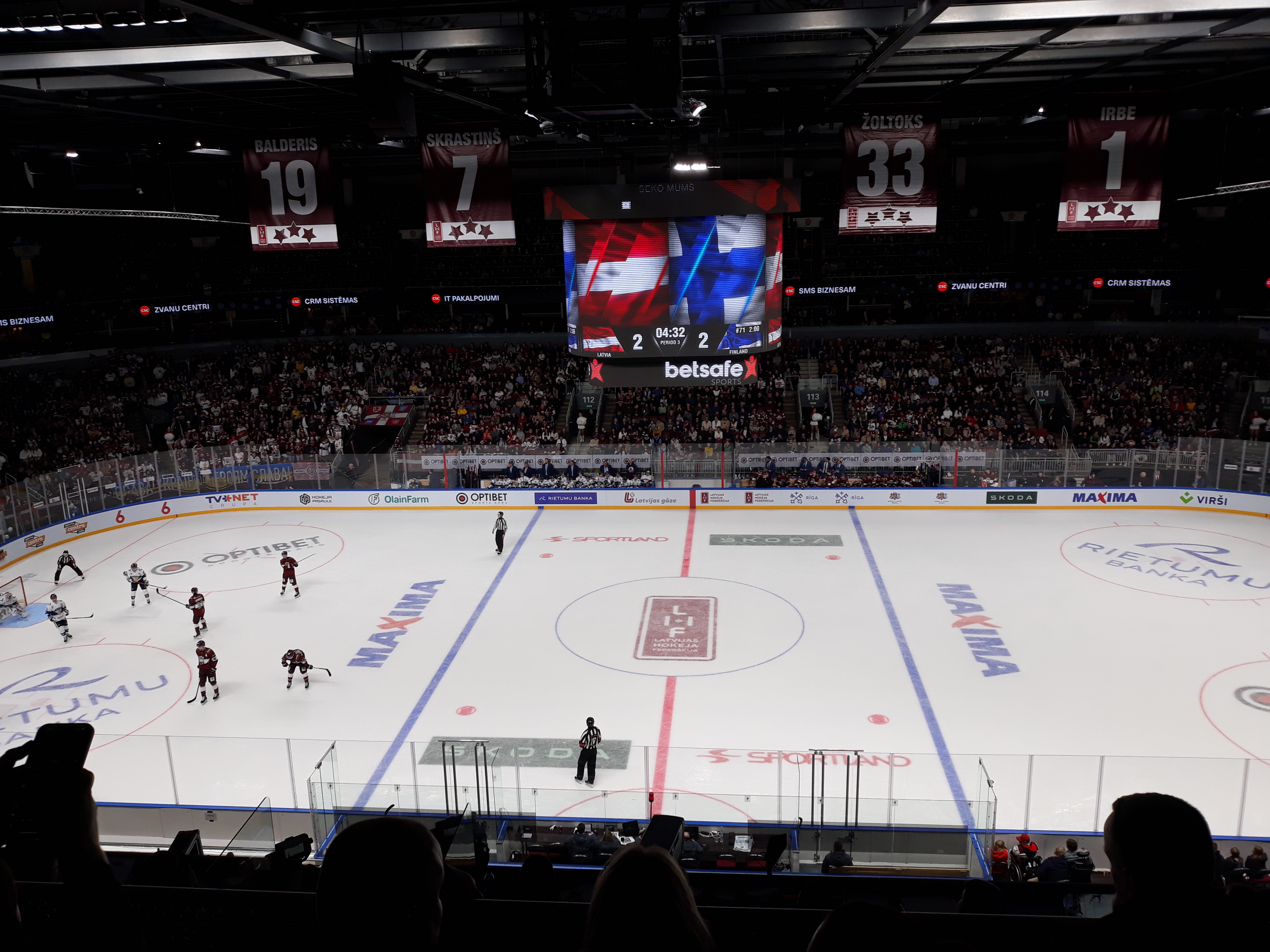
Exhibition game Latvia - Finland (April 2024)

As of 8 November 2025.

Opponent	Played	Won	Drawn	Lost	GF	GA	GD
Austria	28	23	0	5	106	65	+41
Belarus	40	19	3	18	106	97	+9
Belgium	2	2	0	0	31	4	+27
Canada	24	1	1	22	29	126	-97
China	1	1	0	0	22	0	+22
Czech Republic	19	1	1	17	34	66	−32
Czechoslovakia	2	0	0	2	0	16	−16
Denmark	38	24	0	14	131	93	+38
Estonia	5	5	0	0	32	6	+26
Finland	36	5	2	29	66	136	−70
France	57	37	4	16	195	115	+80
Germany	42	13	4	25	92	115	-23
Great Britain	11	6	1	4	44	39	+5
Hungary	6	4	1	1	31	12	+19
Israel	1	1	0	0	32	0	+32
Italy	19	14	1	4	71	30	+41
Japan	13	12	0	1	79	26	+53
Kazakhstan	15	10	0	5	54	31	+23
Lithuania	5	5	0	0	45	2	+43
Netherlands	6	6	0	0	45	6	+39
North Korea	1	1	0	0	4	0	+4
Norway	45	27	0	18	144	112	+30
Poland	21	16	0	5	72	50	+22
Romania	8	6	0	2	49	7	+42
Russia	22	6	1	15	38	83	−45
Slovakia	38	12	2	24	80	123	-43
Slovenia	14	13	0	2	49	25	+24
South Korea	3	3	0	0	38	2	+36
Sweden	30	3	1	26	50	126	−76
Switzerland	43	10	3	30	78	134	-56
Ukraine	20	14	1	5	67	49	+18
United States	19	4	2	13	38	61	−23
Yugoslavia	2	2	0	0	10	0	+10
Total	617	295	28	294	1 910	1 699	+211

== Uniform evolution ==
National team jerseys

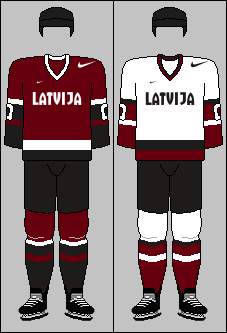
1993-2005 Winter Olympics and IIHF jerseys

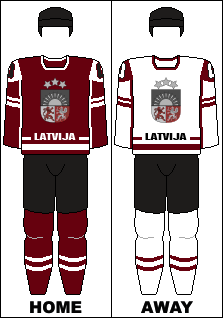
2006-2013 Winter Olympics and IIHF jerseys

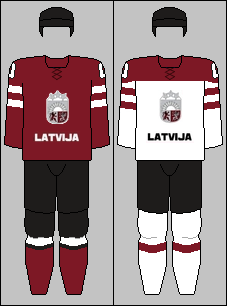
2014-2017 Winter Olympics and IIHF jerseys

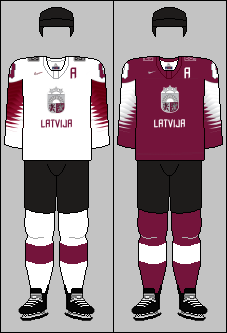
2018–2021 IIHF jerseys

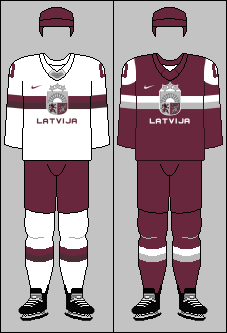
2022– Winter Olympics and IIHF
