= 2000 IIHF World Championship =

2000 edition of the IIHF World Championship

Tournament details
- Host country: Russia
- Venues: 2 (in 1 host city)
- Dates: 29 April – 14 May
- Opened by: Vladimir Putin
- Teams: 16

Final positions
- Champions: Czech Republic (3rd title)
- Runners-up: Slovakia
- Third place: Finland
- Fourth place: Canada

Tournament statistics
- Games played: 56
- Goals scored: 327 (5.84 per game)
- Attendance: 318,449 (5,687 per game)
- Scoring leader: (Slovakia) Miroslav Šatan (12 points)

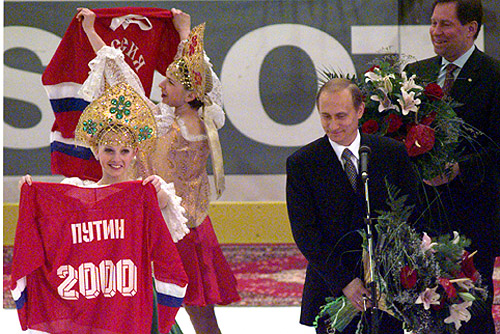
Vladimir Putin at the opening ceremony

The 2000 IIHF World Championship was held in Saint Petersburg, Russia from 29 April to 14 May.

== Qualification ==
This was the final year for qualifying rounds (except 'Far East'). Five teams advanced out of the eight that participated in the two European groups. The top two from each group played in the World Championship, and the third place teams played off against each other for the final spot. Both groups were played 11–14 November 1999.

=== Group 1 (Great Britain) ===
Played in Sheffield

Pos	Team	Pld	W	D	L	GF	GA	GD	Pts
1	Latvia	3	1	2	0	6	3	+3	4
2	Ukraine	3	1	2	0	5	4	+1	4
3	Great Britain	3	0	3	0	3	3	0	3
4	Kazakhstan	3	0	1	2	6	10	−4	1

Source: IIHF

11 November 1999	Latvia	6–3	Kazakhstan

11 November 1999	Great Britain	2–2	Ukraine

13 November 1999	Ukraine	3–2	Kazakhstan

13 November 1999	Great Britain	0–0	Latvia

14 November 1999	Great Britain	1–1	Kazakhstan

14 November 1999	Latvia	0–0	Ukraine

=== Group 2 (France) ===
Played in Amiens

Pos	Team	Pld	W	D	L	GF	GA	GD	Pts
1	Italy	3	2	0	1	11	7	+4	4
2	France	3	1	1	1	10	10	0	3
3	Norway	3	1	1	1	7	8	−1	3
4	Denmark	3	1	0	2	9	12	−3	2

Source: IIHF

11 November 1999	Italy	3–5	Denmark

11 November 1999	France	3–3	Norway

13 November 1999	Italy	4–1	Norway

13 November 1999	France	6–3	Denmark

14 November 1999	Denmark	1–3	Norway

14 November 1999	France	1–4	Italy

=== Playoff (Netherlands) ===
Played in Eindhoven

14 December 1999	Great Britain	1–2	Norway

=== Far East (Japan) ===
Played 3–5 September 1999 in Aomori.

Pos	Team	Pld	W	D	L	GF	GA	GD	Pts
1	Japan	2	2	0	0	14	0	+14	4
2	China	2	1	0	1	4	7	−3	2
3	South Korea	2	0	0	2	2	13	−11	0

Source: IIHF

03 September 1999	China	4–2	South Korea

04 September 1999	Japan	9–0	South Korea

05 September 1999	Japan	5–0	China

== Venues ==
Saint Petersburg	Locations of the two venues in Saint Petersburg.	Saint Petersburg
Ice Palace; Capacity: 12300	Locations of the two venues in Saint Petersburg.	Yubileyny; Capacity: 7000

== Preliminary round ==
Like the previous two years, sixteen nations played in four groups of four. However this year the format was modified so that the top three teams from each group would advance to a group of six, carrying forward the results against the teams who advanced with them. The nations from the first and fourth pools were grouped together, likewise the second and third pools. The fourth placed teams were put in a group together to contest relegation.

=== Group A ===
Pos	Team	Pld	W	D	L	GF	GA	GD	Pts	Qualification
1	Sweden	3	3	0	0	17	3	+14	6	Qualifying round
2	Latvia	3	2	0	1	9	7	+2	4	Qualifying round
3	Belarus	3	1	0	2	10	16	−6	2	Qualifying round
4	Ukraine	3	0	0	3	6	16	−10	0	Relegation round

Source: IIHF

30 April 2000; 16:30	Belarus	7–3 (3–1, 3–1, 1–1)	Ukraine	Ice Palace; Attendance: 3,500

Game reference

30 April 2000; 20:30	Latvia	1–3 (0–2, 1–1, 0–0)	Sweden	Ice Palace; Attendance: 6,500

Game reference

2 May 2000; 16:30	Belarus	3–6 (0–2, 3–3, 0–1)	Latvia	Ice Palace; Attendance: 7,200

Game reference

2 May 2000; 20:30	Sweden	7–2 (2–1, 3–1, 2–0)	Ukraine	Ice Palace; Attendance: 4,200

Game reference

4 May 2000; 16:30	Ukraine	1–2 (1–0, 0–1, 0–1)	Latvia	Ice Palace; Attendance: 10,800

Game reference

4 May 2000; 20:30	Sweden	7–0 (4–0, 0–0, 3–0)	Belarus	Ice Palace; Attendance: 7,200

Game reference

=== Group B ===
Pos	Team	Pld	W	D	L	GF	GA	GD	Pts	Qualification
1	Slovakia	3	2	1	0	10	4	+6	5	Qualifying round
2	Finland	3	1	2	0	11	5	+6	4	Qualifying round
3	Italy	3	1	0	2	5	12	−7	2	Qualifying round
4	Austria	3	0	1	2	3	8	−5	1	Relegation round

Source: IIHF

30 April 2000; 16:30	Slovakia	2–0 (0–0, 0–0, 2–0)	Austria	Yubileyny; Attendance: 750

Game reference

30 April 2000; 20:30	Italy	0–6 (0–2, 0–4, 0–0)	Finland	Yubileyny; Attendance: 3051

Game reference

2 May 2000; 16:30	Slovakia	6–2 (2–1, 0–0, 4–1)	Italy	Yubileyny; Attendance: 1,950

Game reference

2 May 2000; 20:30	Finland	3–3 (0–0, 1–2, 2–1)	Austria	Yubileyny; Attendance: 3,950

Game reference

4 May 2000; 16:30	Austria	0–3 (0–1, 0–1, 0–1)	Italy	Yubileyny; Attendance: 3,059

Game reference

4 May 2000; 20:30	Finland	2–2 (1–1, 1–0, 0–1)	Slovakia	Yubileyny; Attendance: 6,995

Game reference

=== Group C ===
Pos	Team	Pld	W	D	L	GF	GA	GD	Pts	Qualification
1	Czech Republic	3	3	0	0	12	4	+8	6	Qualifying round
2	Norway	3	2	0	1	13	7	+6	4	Qualifying round
3	Canada	3	1	0	2	10	6	+4	2	Qualifying round
4	Japan	3	0	0	3	3	21	−18	0	Relegation round

Source: IIHF

29 April 2000; 16:30	Canada	6–0 (1–0, 2–0, 3–0)	Japan	Yubileyny; Attendance: 852

Game reference

29 April 2000; 20:30	Norway	0–4 (0–1, 0–0, 0–3)	Czech Republic	Yubileyny; Attendance: 1,600

Game reference

1 May 2000; 16:30	Czech Republic	6–3 (2–1, 2–1, 2–1)	Japan	Yubileyny; Attendance: 1,500

Game reference

1 May 2000; 20:30	Canada	3–4 (0–0, 3–3, 0–1)	Norway	Yubileyny; Attendance: 3,300

Game reference

3 May 2000; 16:30	Japan	0–9 (0–4, 0–3, 0–2)	Norway	Yubileyny; Attendance: 1,685

Game reference

3 May 2000; 20:30	Czech Republic	2–1 (1–1, 1–0, 0–0)	Canada	Yubileyny; Attendance: 5,261

Game reference

=== Group D ===
Pos	Team	Pld	W	D	L	GF	GA	GD	Pts	Qualification
1	United States	3	2	1	0	9	5	+4	5	Qualifying round
2	Switzerland	3	1	1	1	8	9	−1	3	Qualifying round
3	Russia (H)	3	1	0	2	10	7	+3	2	Qualifying round
4	France	3	1	0	2	7	13	−6	2	Relegation round

Source: IIHF
(H) Hosts

29 April 2000; 16:30	United States	3–3 (1–1, 1–1, 1–1)	Switzerland	Ice Palace; Attendance: 5,730

Game reference
8 min	Penalties	12 min
22	Shots	25

29 April 2000; 20:30	Russia	8–1 (3–1, 4–0, 1–0)	France	Ice Palace; Attendance: 11,000

Game reference

Ilya Bryzgalov
Goalies
Patrick Rolland
Fabrice Lhenry
Referee:
(Czech Republic) Vladimír Šindler
Linesmen:
(Finland) Panu Bruun
(Sweden) Johan Norrman

Sushinsky (Markov) – 01:14	1–0
Sushinsky (Kharitonov) – 06:21	2–0
Afinogenov (Petrov, Kozlov) – 09:31	3–0
	3–1	10:54 – Bachelet
Gonchar (Kudashov) (PP) – 22:54	4–1
Bure – 24:15	5–1
Sushinsky (Prokopiev, Kharitonov) – 28:52	6–1
Bure (Zhitnik) – 30:41	7–1
Prokopiev (Sushinsky) – 57:56	8–1

8 min
Penalties
20 min
48
Shots
14

1 May 2000; 16:30	Switzerland	2–4 (0–0, 2–2, 0–2)	France	Ice Palace; Attendance: 3,200

Game reference
16 min	Penalties	14 min
27	Shots	33

1 May 2000; 20:30	Russia	0–3 (0–0, 0–2, 0–1)	United States	Ice Palace; Attendance: 12,350

Game reference

Ilya Bryzgalov
Goalies
Robert Esche
Referee:
(Slovakia) Vladimír Mihálik
Linesmen:
(Finland) Panu Bruun
(Sweden) Johan Norrman

0–1	29:17 – Blake (Peluso, Weinrich) (PP)
0–2	31:13 – Housley (Peluso, Heinze)
0–3	46:06 – Legwand

10 min
Penalties
12 min
44
Shots
30

3 May 2000; 16:30	France	2–3 (0–2, 1–0, 1–1)	United States	Ice Palace; Attendance: 5,500

Game reference
16 min	Penalties	12 min
21	Shots	31

3 May 2000; 20:30	Switzerland	3–2 (1–1, 2–1, 0–0)	Russia	Ice Palace; Attendance: 12,300

Game reference

Reto Pavoni
Goalies
Ilya Bryzgalov
Referee:
(Canada) Kevin Acheson
Linesmen:
(Norway) Pål Garsjø
(Germany) Christian Oswald

	0–1	12:19 – Yashin (Bure, Kozlov)
Sutter (Jenni, Keller) – 01:14	1–1
	1–2	35:11 – Kozlov (Yashin, Markov)
Conne (Della Rossa) – 36:05	2–2
Ziegler (Micheli) – 38:03	3–2

10 min
Penalties
6 min
21
Shots
36

== Relegation round ==
=== Group G ===
The relegation round is composed of the four teams that placed last in Groups A through D. They play in a round-robin fashion, with the last placed team that is not the far east qualifier, being relegated to the Division I group in next year's World Championships.

Pos	Team	Pld	W	D	L	GF	GA	GD	Pts	Relegation
1	Austria	3	2	1	0	11	8	+3	5	
2	Ukraine	3	2	0	1	9	5	+4	4	
3	France	3	1	1	1	12	8	+4	3	Relegation to Division I
4	Japan	3	0	0	3	5	16	−11	0	

Source: IIHF

6 May 2000; 16:30	France	3–3 (0–2, 2–1, 1–0)	Austria	Yubileyny; Attendance: 4,168

Game reference

6 May 2000; 16:30	Ukraine	4–0 (3–0, 0–0, 1–0)	Japan	Ice Palace; Attendance: 5,250

Game reference

7 May 2000; 12:30	France	2–3 (0–1, 0–1, 2–1)	Ukraine	Ice Palace; Attendance: 5,200

Game reference

7 May 2000; 12:30	Austria	5–3 (2–1, 1–1, 2–1)	Japan	Yubileyny; Attendance: 4,848

Game reference

9 May 2000; 12:30	France	7–2 (3–0, 1–1, 3–1)	Japan	Ice Palace; Attendance: 8,050

Game reference

9 May 2000; 12:30	Austria	3–2 (0–0, 0–2, 3–0)	Ukraine	Yubileyny; Attendance: 5,412

Game reference

France is relegated to Division I. Japan will play together with China and Korea in 2001 IIHF World Championship Far East Qualification Tournament

== Qualifying round ==
=== Group E ===
Pos	Team	Pld	W	D	L	GF	GA	GD	Pts	Qualification
1	United States	5	3	2	0	13	7	+6	8	Quarterfinals
2	Switzerland	5	2	2	1	14	12	+2	6	Quarterfinals
3	Sweden	5	2	1	2	16	11	+5	5	Quarterfinals
4	Latvia	5	2	1	2	12	13	−1	5	Quarterfinals
5	Belarus	5	2	0	3	9	17	−8	4	
6	Russia (H)	5	1	0	4	8	12	−4	2	

Source: IIHF
(H) Hosts

5 May 2000; 16:30	Latvia	3–2 (0–0, 3–2, 0–0)	Russia	Ice Palace; Attendance: 7,500

Game reference

Artūrs Irbe
Goalies
Ilya Bryzgalov
Yegor Podomatsky
Referee:
(Sweden) Peter Andersson
Linesmen:
(United States) John Costello
(Canada) Serge Carpentier

Beļavskis (Kerčs, Laviņš) (PP) – 21:58	1–0
	1–1	34:16 – Petrov (Zhamnov)
Semjonovs (Ņiživijs) – 36:58	2–1
Semjonovs (PP) – 38:36	3–1
	3–2	39:25 – Bure (Kozlov)

12 min
Penalties
16 min
26
Shots
39

5 May 2000; 20:30	United States	1–0 (0–0, 1–0, 0–0)	Belarus	Ice Palace; Attendance: 5,300

Game reference
Damian Rhodes	Goalies	Andrei Mezin
Luongo – 26:17 / 1–0
8 min	Penalties	6 min
28	Shots	25

6 May 2000; 20:30	Sweden	1–1 (0–0, 0–0, 1–1)	Switzerland	Ice Palace; Attendance: 6,800

Game reference
14 min	Penalties	18 min
35	Shots	9

7 May 2000; 16:30	Russia	0–1 (0–1, 0–0, 0–0)	Belarus	Ice Palace; Attendance: 11,600

Game reference
Yegor Podomatsky	Goalies	Andrei Mezin; Leonid Fatikov	Referee: (Czech Republic) Vladimír Šindler; Linesmen: (Switzerland) Nadir Mandioni (Germany) Christian Oswald
0–1 / 12:00 – Tsyplakov (Kalyuzhny) (PP)			Referee: (Czech Republic) Vladimír Šindler; Linesmen: (Switzerland) Nadir Mandioni (Germany) Christian Oswald
8 min	Penalties	6 min	Referee: (Czech Republic) Vladimír Šindler; Linesmen: (Switzerland) Nadir Mandioni (Germany) Christian Oswald
31	Shots	18	Referee: (Czech Republic) Vladimír Šindler; Linesmen: (Switzerland) Nadir Mandioni (Germany) Christian Oswald

7 May 2000; 20:30	United States	1–1 (0–1, 0–0, 1–0)	Latvia	Ice Palace; Attendance: 3,100

Game reference
12 min	Penalties	12 min
37	Shots	19

8 May 2000; 16:30	Latvia	1–4 (0–0, 0–3, 1–1)	Switzerland	Ice Palace; Attendance: 3,600

Game reference
12 min	Penalties	6 min
24	Shots	21

8 May 2000; 20:30	Sweden	3–5 (1–2, 2–2, 0–1)	United States	Ice Palace; Attendance: 5,800

Game reference
8 min	Penalties	12 min
23	Shots	22

9 May 2000; 16:30	Switzerland	3–5 (3–1, 0–3, 0–1)	Belarus	Ice Palace; Attendance: 5,100

Game reference
18 min	Penalties	30 min
20	Shots	31

9 May 2000; 20:30	Sweden	2–4 (1–1, 0–1, 1–2)	Russia	Ice Palace; Attendance: 12,100

Game reference

Mikael Tellqvist
Goalies
Yegor Podomatsky
Referee:
(Finland) Pekka Haajanen
Linesmen:
(Switzerland) Nadir Mandioni
(Germany) Christian Oswald

	0–1	03:27 – Kharitonov (Khavanov)
Axelsson – 03:53	1–1
	1–2	26:24 – Kharitonov (Prokopiev) (SH)
	1–3	42:21 – Prokopiev (Kharitonov) (SH)
	1–4	56:06 – Bure
Nordström (Andersson, Nord)– 56:21	2–4

16 min
Penalties
10 min
15
Shots
27

=== Group F ===
Pos	Team	Pld	W	D	L	GF	GA	GD	Pts	Qualification
1	Czech Republic	5	4	0	1	25	11	+14	8	Quarterfinals
2	Finland	5	3	1	1	22	15	+7	7	Quarterfinals
3	Canada	5	3	0	2	19	10	+9	6	Quarterfinals
4	Slovakia	5	2	1	2	22	15	+7	5	Quarterfinals
5	Norway	5	1	1	3	10	24	−14	3	
6	Italy	5	0	1	4	5	28	−23	1	

Source: IIHF

5 May 2000; 16:30	Finland	1–5 (1–0, 0–1, 0–4)	Canada	Yubileyny; Attendance: 6,615

Game reference

5 May 2000; 20:30	Czech Republic	9–2 (2–0, 5–0, 2–2)	Italy	Yubileyny; Attendance: 3,132

Game reference

6 May 2000; 20:30	Slovakia	9–1 (3–0, 1–1, 5–0)	Norway	Yubileyny; Attendance: 2,001

Game reference

7 May 2000; 16:30	Canada	6–0 (2–0, 3–0, 1–0)	Italy	Yubileyny; Attendance: 4,730

Game reference

7 May 2000; 20:30	Czech Republic	4–6 (2–1, 1–2, 1–3)	Finland	Yubileyny; Attendance: 7,182

Game reference

8 May 2000; 16:30	Norway	4–7 (0–2, 3–4, 1–1)	Finland	Yubileyny; Attendance: 4,610

Game reference

8 May 2000; 20:30	Czech Republic	6–2 (1–0, 3–2, 2–0)	Slovakia	Yubileyny; Attendance: 3,999

Game reference

9 May 2000; 16:30	Norway	1–1 (0–0, 1–0, 0–1)	Italy	Yubileyny; Attendance: 3,080

Game reference

9 May 2000; 20:30	Slovakia	3–4 (1–0, 1–2, 1–2)	Canada	Yubileyny; Attendance: 5,525

Game reference

== Final round ==
=== Bracket ===
Quarterfinals
E1	United States	1
F4	Slovakia	4
F2	Finland	2
E3	Sweden	1
E2	Switzerland	3
F3	Canada	5
F1	Czech Republic	3
E4	Latvia	1

Semifinals
QF1	Slovakia	3
QF4	Finland	1
QF3	Canada	1
QF2	Czech Republic	2

Final
SF1	Slovakia	3
SF2	Czech Republic	5
Third Place
SF1	Finland	2
SF2	Canada	1

=== Quarterfinals ===
11 May 2000; 16:30	United States	1–4 (1–0, 0–3, 0–1)	Slovakia	Ice Palace; Attendance: 1,900

11 May 2000; 16:30	Finland	2–1 (0–1, 0–0, 2–0)	Sweden	Yubileyny; Attendance: 6,120

11 May 2000; 20:30	Switzerland	3–5 (0–1, 2–1, 1–3)	Canada	Ice Palace; Attendance: 3,500

11 May 2000; 20:30	Czech Republic	3–1 (0–0, 3–1, 0–0)	Latvia	Yubileyny; Attendance: 3,244

=== Semifinals ===
12 May 2000; 16:30	Slovakia	3–1 (2–0, 1–1, 0–0)	Finland	Ice Palace; Attendance: 10800

12 May 2000; 20:30	Canada	1–2 (1–1, 0–0, 0–1)	Czech Republic	Ice Palace; Attendance: 11,700

=== Bronze medal game ===
14 May 2000; 14:30	Canada	1–2 (1–0, 0–1, 0–1)	Finland	Ice Palace; Attendance: 10,700

Adrian Aucoin – 07:37	1–0
	1–1	35:29 − Jukka Hentunen
	1–2	49:02 − Marko Tuomainen

=== Final ===
14 May 2000; 18:30	Slovakia	3–5 (0–3, 1–0, 2–2)	Czech Republic	Ice Palace Arena, Saint Petersburg; Attendance: 12,350

Game reference

Ján Lašák
Goalies
Roman Čechmánek
Referee:
(Canada) K. Acheson
Linesmen:
(Canada) S. Carpentier
(United States) J. Costello

	0–1	6:04 – M. Sýkora (M. Procházka, V. Varaďa)
	0–2	9:34 – T. Vlasák (P. Buzek)
	0–3	12:25 – M. Procházka (T. Vlasák, P. Patera)
M. Štrbák (R. Suchý, P. Pucher) – 27:43	1–3
	1–4	43:45 – J. Tomajko (J. Dopita, D. Výborný)
M. Hlinka – 55:22	2–4
M. Šatan (L. Bartečko) – 57:38	3–4
	3–5	58:58 – R. Reichel (M. Sýkora, V. Prospal)

5 min
Penalties
10 min
33
Shots
15

== Ranking and statistics ==
2000 IIHF World Championship winners

Czech Republic
3rd/9th title

=== Tournament Awards ===
- Best players selected by the directorate:
  - Best Goaltender: (Czech Republic) Roman Čechmánek
  - Best Defenceman: (Finland) Petteri Nummelin
  - Best Forward: (Slovakia) Miroslav Šatan
  - Most Valuable Player: (Czech Republic) Martin Procházka
- Media All-Star Team:
  - Goaltender: (Czech Republic) Roman Čechmánek
  - Defence: (Finland) Petteri Nummelin, (Czech Republic) Michal Sýkora
  - Forwards: (Czech Republic) Jiří Dopita, (Slovakia) Miroslav Šatan, (Czech Republic) Tomáš Vlasák

=== Final standings ===
The final standings of the tournament according to IIHF:

1st place, gold medalist(s)	Czech Republic
2nd place, silver medalist(s)	Slovakia
3rd place, bronze medalist(s)	Finland
4	Canada
5	United States
6	Switzerland
7	Sweden
8	Latvia
9	Belarus
10	Norway
11	Russia
12	Italy
13	Austria
14	Ukraine
15	France
16	Japan

=== Scoring leaders ===
List shows the top skaters sorted by points, then goals. If the list exceeds 10 skaters because of a tie in points, all of the tied skaters are left out.

Player	GP	G	A	Pts	+/−	PIM	POS
(Slovakia) Miroslav Šatan	9	10	2	12	+3	14	F
(Czech Republic) Jiří Dopita	9	4	7	11	+8	16	F
(Czech Republic) David Výborný	9	4	6	10	+6	6	F
(Canada) Todd Bertuzzi	9	5	4	9	+5	47	F
(Czech Republic) Tomáš Vlasák	9	4	5	9	+4	0	F
(Norway) Trond Magnussen	6	3	6	9	+4	10	F
(Canada) Ryan Smyth	9	3	6	9	+3	0	F
(Czech Republic) Michal Sýkora	9	5	3	8	+7	16	D
(France) Arnaud Briand	6	4	4	8	−2	8	F
(France) Maurice Rozenthal	6	3	5	8	0	8	F

=== Leading goaltenders ===
Only the top five goaltenders, based on save percentage, who have played 40% of their team's minutes are included in this list.

Player	MIP	SOG	GA	GAA	SVS%	SO
(Canada) José Théodore	478:11	192	13	1.63	93.23	2
(Austria) Reinhard Divis	358:56	201	15	2.51	92.54	0
(Czech Republic) Roman Čechmánek	480:00	212	16	2.00	92.45	1
(Sweden) Tommy Salo	358:31	128	10	1.67	92.19	1
(Switzerland) Reto Pavoni	299:41	151	14	2.80	90.73	0

== IIHF honors and awards ==
The 2000 IIHF Hall of Fame induction ceremony has held in Saint Petersburg during the World Championships. Vsevolod Kukushkin of Russia was given the Paul Loicq Award for outstanding contributions to international ice hockey.

IIHF Hall of Fame inductees

- Wayne Gretzky, Canada
- Tomas Jonsson, Sweden
- Udo Kießling, Germany
- Jari Kurri, Finland
- Boris Mikhailov, Russia
- Peter Šťastný, Slovakia
- Göran Stubb, Finland

== See also ==
- 2000 IIHF Women's World Championship
- 2000 World Junior Ice Hockey Championships
