= 2009–10 Barys Astana season =

2009–10 Barys Astana
- Division: 6th Chernyshev
- Conference: 3rd Eastern
- 2009–10 record: 20–23–6–7
- Home record: 9–8–5–4
- Road record: 8–15–1–3
- Goals for: 169
- Goals against: 173

Team information
- President: Nurlan Orazbayev
- General manager: Vadim Guseinov
- Coach: Andrei Shayanov
- Captain: Kevin Dallman
- Alternate captains: Jozef Stümpel; Maxim Spiridonov
- Arena: Kazakhstan Sports Palace
- Average attendance: 4,814 (87,0 %) (total: 284,026)

Team leaders
- Goals: Maxim Spiridonov (24)
- Assists: Jozef Stümpel (39)
- Points: Jozef Stümpel (52)
- Penalty minutes: Kevin Dallman (90)
- Plus/minus: (+): Alexander Shin (+11) (−): Peter Podhradsky (−11)
- Wins: Jeff Glass (19)
- Goals against average: Alexei Kuznetsov (2.82)

The 2009–10 Barys Astana season was the Kontinental Hockey League franchise's 2nd season of play. The 2009–10 season saw Barys have a very similar season than the previous. Veteran Jozef Stümpel finished top scorer of the team, with 13 goals and 39 assists (52 points), two better than Maxim Spiridonov, who was the best goal scorer of the team with 24. Fan favourite Kevin Dallman also was a major contributor, with 14 goals and 27 assists. Newcomer Jeff Glass did a fine job between the pipes, with 19 wins and a 2.87 goals against average, helping the team finish fourteenth overall of the KHL, a one place improvement from 2008–09. Barys was however once again swept in three games by Ak Bars Kazan in the first round of the playoffs.

== Standings ==
=== Division standings ===
Source: Kontinental Hockey League Official Website

R		GP	W	OTW	SOW	SOL	OTL	L	GF	GA	Pts
1	Salavat Yulaev Ufa	56	37	4	3	3	1	8	215	116	129
2	Avangard Omsk	56	24	2	2	6	4	18	152	128	90
3	Barys Astana	56	20	5	1	6	1	23	169	173	79
4	Sibir Novosibirsk	56	15	2	5	3	1	30	147	190	63
5	Amur Khabarovsk	56	12	3	6	4	2	29	129	187	60
6	Metallurg Novokuznetsk	56	13	1	2	2	5	33	105	159	52

=== Conference standings ===
Source: Kontinental Hockey League Official Website

R		Div	GP	W	OTW	SOW	SOL	OTL	L	GF	GA	Pts
1	Salavat Yulaev Ufa	CHE	56	37	4	3	3	1	8	215	116	129
2	Metallurg Magnitogorsk	KHA	56	34	2	4	1	0	15	167	111	115
3	Ak Bars Kazan	KHA	56	25	4	4	3	2	18	159	128	96
4	Neftekhimik Nizhnekamsk	KHA	56	27	3	1	4	0	21	176	166	93
5	Avangard Omsk	CHE	56	24	2	2	6	4	18	152	128	90
6	Barys Astana	CHE	56	20	5	1	6	1	23	169	173	79
7	Traktor Chelyabinsk	KHA	56	18	0	3	2	2	31	137	192	64
8	Avtomobilist Yekaterinburg	KHA	56	14	2	6	2	4	28	127	159	64
9	Sibir Novosibirsk	CHE	56	15	2	5	3	1	30	147	190	63
10	Amur Khabarovsk	CHE	56	12	3	6	4	2	29	129	187	60
11	Lada Togliatti	KHA	56	14	0	2	6	3	31	115	173	55
12	Metallurg Novokuznetsk	CHE	56	13	1	2	2	5	33	105	159	52

Divisions: KHA – Kharlamov Division, CHE – Chernyshev Division

== Schedule and results ==
=== Regular season ===
2009–10 game log
September: 2–2–2–2 (home: 0–1–2–2; road: 2–1–0–0) 12 pts.

Game	Date	Opponent	Score	Decision	Location	Attendance	Record	Points	Recap
1	12 September	Avangard Omsk	1–0 (OT)	Alexei Kuznetsov	Kazakhstan Sports Palace	5,000	0–0–1–0	2	
2	14 September	Dynamo Moscow	4–5	Alexei Kuznetsov	Luzhniki Minor Arena	1,800	0–1–1–0	2	
3	16 September	Dinamo Riga	4–2	Jeff Glass	Arena Riga	4,916	1–1–1–0	5	
4	18 September	Dinamo Minsk	2–1	Jeff Glass	Minsk Sports Palace	3,500	2–1–1–0	8	
5	22 September	Lada Togliatti	2–1 (SO)	Jeff Glass	Kazakhstan Sports Palace	4,800	2–1–2–0	10	
6	24 September	Ak Bars Kazan	4–5 (SO)	Jeff Glass	Kazakhstan Sports Palace	5,200	2–1–2–1	11	
7	26 September	Neftekhimik Nizhnekamsk	1–2 (SO)	Alexei Kuznetsov	Kazakhstan Sports Palace	4,000	2–1–2–2	12	
8	29 September	Salavat Yulaev Ufa	1–2	Alexei Kuznetsov	Kazakhstan Sports Palace	5,250	2–2–2–2	12	

October: 7–3–0–3 (home: 4–0–0–0; road: 3–3–0–3) 24 pts.

Game	Date	Opponent	Score	Decision	Location	Attendance	Record	Points	Recap
9	1 October	Lokomotiv Yaroslavl	3–5	Ildar Mukhometov	Arena 2000	8,900	2–3–2–2	12	
10	3 October	Spartak Moscow	2–3 (SO)	Jeff Glass	Sokolniki Arena	3,100	2–3–2–3	13	
11	5 October	HC MVD	1–5	Alexei Kuznetsov	Balashikha Arena	2,000	2–4–2–3	13	
12	7 October	Avangard Omsk	3–6	Jeff Glass	Omsk Arena	10,200	2–5–2–3	13	
13	10 October	Amur Khabarovsk	4–2	Alexei Kuznetsov	Kazakhstan Sports Palace	4,500	3–5–2–3	16	
14	13 October	Sibir Novosibirsk	4–3	Alexei Kuznetsov	Ice Sports Palace Sibir	5,000	4–5–2–3	19	
15	15 October	Metallurg Novokuznetsk	2–3 (OT)	Alexei Kuznetsov	Kuznetsk Metallurgists Arena	3,300	4–5–2–4	20	
16	19 October	CSKA Moscow	5–2	Jeff Glass	Kazakhstan Sports Palace	5,000	5–5–2–4	23	
17	21 October	Torpedo Nizhny Novgorod	4–2	Jeff Glass	Kazakhstan Sports Palace	4,950	6–5–2–4	26	
18	23 October	Vityaz Chekhov	3–1	Jeff Glass	Kazakhstan Sports Palace	5,000	7–5–2–4	29	
19	26 October	SKA Saint Petersburg	2–3 (SO)	Jeff Glass	Ice Palace Saint Petersburg	5,300	7–5–2–5	30	
20	28 October	Atlant Moscow Oblast	3–0	Jeff Glass	Mytishchi Arena	4,000	8–5–2–5	33	
21	30 October	Severstal Cherepovets	3–1	Jeff Glass	Ice Palace Cherepovets	2,000	9–5–2–5	36	

November: 1–4–3–0 (home: 1–2–2–0; road: 0–2–1–0) 9 pts.

Game	Date	Opponent	Score	Decision	Location	Attendance	Record	Points	Recap
22	1 November	Salavat Yulaev Ufa	3–4	Jeff Glass	Ufa Arena	8,250	9–6–2–5	36	
23	12 November	Metallurg Magnitogorsk	7–1	Jeff Glass	Kazakhstan Sports Palace	5,500	10–6–2–5	39	
24	14 November	Avtomobilist Yekaterinburg	5–4 (OT)	Alexei Kuznetsov	Kazakhstan Sports Palace	4,900	10–6–3–5	41	
25	16 November	Traktor Chelyabinsk	3–5	Alexei Kuznetsov	Kazakhstan Sports Palace	4,300	10–7–3–5	41	
26	18 November	Avangard Omsk	3–2 (OT)	Jeff Glass	Kazakhstan Sports Palace	4,700	10–7–4–5	43	
27	22 November	Sibir Novosibirsk	3–5	Jeff Glass	Ice Sports Palace Sibir	6,500	10–8–4–5	43	
28	24 November	Metallurg Novokuznetsk	3–2 (OT)	Jeff Glass	Kuznetsk Metallurgists Arena	2,700	10–8–5–5	45	
29	26 November	Amur Khabarovsk	4–3	Jeff Glass	Kazakhstan Sports Palace	4,250	11–8–5–5	48	
30	28 November	Metallurg Novokuznetsk	3–2	Jeff Glass	Kazakhstan Sports Palace	4,500	12–8–5–5	51	
31	30 November	Sibir Novosibirsk	3–4	Alexei Kuznetsov	Kazakhstan Sports Palace	4,000	12–9–5–5	51	

December: 1–6–0–2 (home: 0–2–0–2; road: 1–4–0–0) 5 pts.

Game	Date	Opponent	Score	Decision	Location	Attendance	Record	Points	Recap
32	3 December	Avangard Omsk	2–1	Alexei Kuznetsov	Omsk Arena	10,020	12–10–5–5	51	
33	5 December	Salavat Yulaev Ufa	2–3 (SO)	Alexei Kuznetsov	Kazakhstan Sports Palace	5,500	12–10–5–6	52	
34	7 December	Traktor Chelyabinsk	4–2	Jeff Glass	Traktor Ice Arena	4,500	13–10–5–6	55	
35	9 December	Metallurg Magnitogorsk	0–4	Jeff Glass	Magnitogorsk Arena	5,244	13–11–5–6	55	
36	11 December	Avtomobilist Yekaterinburg	2–5	Alexei Kuznetsov	Yekaterinburg Sports Palace	3,500	13–12–5–6	55	
37	13 December	Salavat Yulaev Ufa	4–1	Jeff Glass	Ufa Arena	8,250	13–13–5–6	55	
38	23 December	Severstal Cherepovets	3–4	Jeff Glass	Kazakhstan Sports Palace	4,400	13–14–5–6	55	
39	25 December	Atlant Moscow Oblast	4–5 (SO)	Jeff Glass	Kazakhstan Sports Palace	4,000	13–14–5–7	56	
40	27 December	SKA Saint Petersburg	1–5	Alexei Kuznetsov	Kazakhstan Sports Palace	5,100	13–15–5–7	56	

January: 4–4–1–0 (home: 2–1–1–0; road: 2–3–0–0) 14 pts.

Game	Date	Opponent	Score	Decision	Location	Attendance	Record	Points	Recap
41	3 January	CSKA Moscow	5–3	Jeff Glass	CSKA Ice Palace	3,100	14–15–5–7	59	
42	5 January	Torpedo Nizhny Novgorod	3–5	Alexei Kuznetsov	Trade Union Sport Palace	5,500	14–16–5–7	59	
43	7 January	Vityaz Chekhov	1–5	Alexei Kuznetsov	Ice Hockey Center 2004	3,000	14–17–5–7	59	
44	11 January	Sibir Novosibirsk	5–0	Alexei Kuznetsov	Kazakhstan Sports Palace	4,850	15–17–5–7	62	
45	13 January	Metallurg Novokuznetsk	0–3	Alexei Kuznetsov	Kazakhstan Sports Palace	4,800	15–18–5–7	62	
46	18 January	Amur Khabarovsk	3–5	Jeff Glass	Platinum Arena	7,100	15–19–5–7	62	
47	19 January	Amur Khabarovsk	8–5	Jeff Glass	Platinum Arena	7,100	16–19–5–7	65	
48	24 January	HC MVD	2–4	Alexei Kuznetsov	Kazakhstan Sports Palace	4,800	16–20–5–7	65	
49	26 January	Lokomotiv Yaroslavl	3–2 (OT)	Jeff Glass	Kazakhstan Sports Palace	4,800	16–20–6–7	67	
50	28 January	Spartak Moscow	9–3	Jeff Glass	Kazakhstan Sports Palace	5,200	17–20–6–7	70	

February: 0–0–0–0 (home: 0–0–0–0; road: 1–2–0–0) 3 pts.

Game	Date	Opponent	Score	Decision	Location	Attendance	Record	Points	Recap
51	3 February	Ak Bars Kazan	1–4	Jeff Glass	TatNeft Arena	4,620	17–21–6–7	70	
52	5 February	Lada Togliatti	2–1	Jeff Glass	Volgar Sports Palace	2,900	18–21–6–7	73	
53	7 February	Neftekhimik Nizhnekamsk	2–4	Jeff Glass	Neftekhimik Ice Palace	5,500	18–22–6–7	73	

March: 2–1–0–0 (home: 2–1–0–0; road: 0–0–0–0) 6 pts.

Game	Date	Opponent	Score	Decision	Location	Attendance	Record	Points	Recap
54	3 March	Dinamo Minsk	5–3	Alexei Kuznetsov	Kazakhstan Sports Palace	5,100	19–22–6–7	76	
55	5 March	Dinamo Riga	3–5	Jeff Glass	Kazakhstan Sports Palace	5,100	19–23–6–7	76	
56	7 March	Dynamo Moscow	5–2	Jeff Glass	Kazakhstan Sports Palace	5,300	20–23–6–7	79	

Win (3 points) Overtime/shootout win (2 points) Overtime/shootout loss (1 point) Loss (0 points)

=== Playoffs ===
2010 Gagarin Cup playoffs
Eastern Conference Quarterfinals – #6 Barys vs. #3 Ak Bars – Ak Bars won series 3–0

Game	Date	Opponent	Score	Decision	Location	Attendance	Series	Recap
1	11 March	Ak Bars Kazan	3–4 (3OT)	Jeff Glass	TatNeft Arena	5,900	0–1	
2	12 March	Ak Bars Kazan	2–4	Jeff Glass	TatNeft Arena	5,900	0–2	
3	14 March	Ak Bars Kazan	1–3	Jeff Glass	Kazakhstan Sports Palace	5,500	0–3	

Win Loss

== Player statistics ==
Source: Kontinental Hockey League Official Website

=== Skaters ===
Regular season
Player	GP	G	A	Pts	+/−	PIM
Jozef Stümpel	54	13	39	52	−9	26
Maxim Spiridonov	56	24	26	50	−5	48
Kevin Dallman	55	14	27	41	−7	90
Konstantin Glazachev	42	16	17	33	−10	18
David Nemirovsky	47	15	14	29	−1	28
Peter Podhradsky	56	8	19	27	−11	52
Andrei Gavrilin	56	7	17	24	9	32
Talgat Zhailauov	46	11	11	22	5	24
Vadim Krasnoslobodtsev	42	9	12	21	2	30
Alexander Koreshkov	45	7	8	15	−1	18
Evgeni Rymarev	47	6	7	13	4	32
Trevor Letowski	54	3	10	13	−1	24
Alexander Shin	38	2	11	13	11	10
Sergei Gimayev	54	6	6	12	10	73
Alexei Vasilchenko	53	2	9	11	7	77
Ilya Solaryov	37	5	4	9	1	20
Tomas Kloucek	35	1	7	8	6	44
Roman Starchenko	43	7	0	7	0	6
Andrei Spiridonov	30	6	1	7	4	16
Roman Savchenko	37	3	4	7	7	22
Konstantin Romanov	16	3	0	3	−6	10
Vladimir Antipin	22	0	3	3	2	26
Artemi Lakiza	7	0	0	0	−3	0
Alexei Vorontsov	12	0	0	0	−1	8
Anton Kazantsev	18	0	0	0	−3	31

Playoffs
Player	GP	G	A	Pts	+/−	PIM
Jozef Stümpel	3	1	0	1	−2	0
Maxim Spiridonov	3	0	2	2	−2	4
Konstantin Glazachev	2	0	0	0	−2	0
David Nemirovsky	3	1	0	1	0	0
Peter Podhradsky	3	1	0	1	−2	2
Andrei Gavrilin	3	0	1	1	2	2
Vadim Krasnoslobodtsev	1	1	0	1	0	25
Alexander Koreshkov	3	0	0	0	0	0
Evgeni Rymarev	3	0	0	0	−2	4
Trevor Letowski	3	0	0	0	0	0
Alexander Shin	3	1	0	1	−1	2
Sergei Gimayev	3	0	1	1	3	8
Alexei Vasilchenko	3	0	0	0	1	8
Ilya Solaryov	3	0	1	1	1	4
Tomas Kloucek	3	0	1	1	−3	4
Andrei Spiridonov	3	0	0	0	−2	4
Roman Savchenko	3	0	0	0	−1	0
Konstantin Romanov	2	1	0	1	0	0
Vladimir Antipin	2	0	0	0	−1	0
Artemi Lakiza	1	0	0	0	−1	0
Alexei Vorontsov	1	0	0	0	0	2

=== Goaltenders ===
Regular season
Player	GP	W	L	SOP	SOG	GA	SV	SV%	GAA	G	A	SO	PIM	TOI
Jeff Glass	41	19	11	4	1225	101	1124	91.8	2.87	0	0	1	6	2113:27
Alexei Kuznetsov	25	6	12	4	619	59	560	90.5	2.82	0	0	2	27	1253:35
Ildar Mukhometov	1	0	1	0	16	2	14	87.5	3.46	0	1	1	4	34:41

Playoffs
Player	GP	W	L	SOP	SOG	GA	SV	SV%	GAA	G	A	SO	PIM	TOI
Jeff Glass	3	0	3	0	140	10	130	92.9	2.69	0	0	0	0	223:13

== Final roster ==
Updated 14 March 2010.

No.	Nat	Player	Pos	S/G	Age	Acquired	Birthplace
35	(Canada)	Jeff Glass	G	L	24	2009	Calgary, Alberta, Canada
20	(Kazakhstan)	Alexei Kuznetsov	G	L	27	2007	Ust-Kamenogorsk, Kazakh SSR
77	(Russia)	Ildar Mukhometov	G	L	37	2009	Moscow, Russian SFSR
7	(Kazakhstan)	Artemi Lakiza	D	L	22	2007	Barnaul, Russian SFSR
36	(Kazakhstan)	Vladimir Antipin	D	L	39	2008	Temirtau, Kazakh SSR
59	(Russia)	Sergei Gimayev	D	L	26	2008	Cherepovets, Russian SFSR
22	(Czech Republic)	Tomas Kloucek	D	L	30	2008	Prague, Czechoslovakia
24	(Kazakhstan)	Anton Kazantsev	D	L	23	2008	Rudny, Kazakh SSR
38	(Canada)	Kevin Dallman (C)	D	R	29	2008	Niagara Falls, Ontario, Canada
2	(Kazakhstan)	Roman Savchenko	D	L	21	2009	Ust-Kamenogorsk, Kazakh SSR
37	(Slovakia)	Peter Podhradsky	D	R	30	2009	Bratislava, Czechoslovakia
29	(Kazakhstan)	Alexei Vasilchenko	D	L	28	2008	Ust-Kamenogorsk, Kazakh SSR
8	(Kazakhstan)	Talgat Zhailauov	C	R	24	2007	Ust-Kamenogorsk, Kazakh SSR
15	(Slovakia)	Jozef Stümpel (A)	C	R	37	2008	Nitra, Czechoslovakia
49	(Kazakhstan)	Alexander Shin	C	L	24	2009	Ust-Kamenogorsk, Kazakh SSR
23	(Kazakhstan)	Andrei Spiridonov	C	L	27	2008	Ust-Kamenogorsk, Kazakh SSR
48	(Kazakhstan)	Roman Starchenko	C	L	23	2008	Ust-Kamenogorsk, Kazakh SSR
25	(Kazakhstan)	Ilya Solaryov	C	L	27	2007	Perm, Russian SFSR
62	(Kazakhstan)	Vadim Krasnoslobodtsev	LW	L	26	2008	Ust-Kamenogorsk, Kazakh SSR
18	(Russia)	Konstantin Glazachev	LW	R	25	2008	Arkhangelsk, Russian SFSR
54	(Kazakhstan)	Alexei Vorontsov	LW	L	24	2009	Ust-Kamenogorsk, Kazakh SSR
17	(Kazakhstan)	Alexander Koreshkov	LW	L	46	2007	Ust-Kamenogorsk, Kazakh SSR
10	(Russia)	Maxim Spiridonov (A)	RW	L	31	2008	Moscow, Russian SFSR
33	(Kazakhstan)	Andrei Gavrilin	RW	L	31	2007	Karaganda, Kazakh SSR
9	(Canada)	Trevor Letowski	RW	R	32	2008	Thunder Bay, Ontario, Canada
88	(Kazakhstan)	Evgeni Rymarev	RW	L	21	2009	Ust-Kamenogorsk, Kazakh SSR
81	(Canada)	David Nemirovsky	RW	R	33	2009	Toronto, Ontario, Canada
85	(Kazakhstan)	Konstantin Romanov	RW	L	25	2009	Moscow, Russian SFSR

== Draft picks ==
Barys Astana's picks at the 2009 KHL Junior Draft in Moscow, Russia, on 1 June 2009.

Round	Pick	Player	Position	Nationality	College/junior/club team (league)
3	55	Boris Novikov	D	Russia	Krylya Sovetov (MHL)
4	77	Kirill Alenikov	D	Russia	Steel Foxes (MHL)

== See also ==
- 2009–10 KHL season
