= Ildar =

Ildar is a given name of hybrid Turkic-Persian origin (Turkic İl="nation"; Persian dar="a suffix indicating ownership in compound words"). It is common among Bashkirs and Tatars in Russia and other minorities of Muslim heritage. The name may refer to:

- Ildar Abdrazakov (born 1976), Grammy Award-winning operatic bass singer
- Ildar Akhmetzyanov (born 1983), Russian professional football player
- Ildar Amirov (born 1987), Kyrgyzstani footballer and striker
- Ildar Bikchantayev (born 1990), Russian professional footballer
- Ildar Dadin (1982-2024), Russian political activist
- Ildar Fatchullin (born 1982), Russian ski jumper
- Ildar Garifullin (1963-2023), former Soviet/Russian Nordic combined skier
- Ildar Gizatullin (born 1976), Russian professional football coach and a former player
- Ildar Hafizov (born 1988), amateur Uzbekistani Greco-Roman wrestler in the men's featherweight category
- Ildar Ibragimov (born 1967), chess Grandmaster
- Ildar Isangulov (born 1992), Russian ice hockey defenceman
- Ildar Khairullin (born 1990), Russian chess Grandmaster
- Ildar Magdeev (born 1984), Uzbek footballer
- Ildar Minshin (born 1985), Russian track and field athlete mainly in the 3000 metres steeplechase
- Ildar Mukhometov (born 1972), Russian professional ice hockey goaltender
- Ildar Nugumanov (born 1988), Russian futsal player
- Ildar Pomykalov, paralympian athlete from Russia, mainly in category T12 long-distance events
- Ildar Rakhmatullin (racing driver) (born 1986), Russian racing driver
- Ildar Shabayev (born 1985), Russian professional football player
- Ildar Wafin, Finnish Tatar jewelry designer

== See also ==
- Dildar (disambiguation)
- Havildar
- Idar
- Ildjarn
- Zaildar
