= 2007 IIHF World Championship =

2007 edition of the IIHF World Championship

Tournament details
- Host country: Russia
- Venues: 2 (in 2 host cities)
- Dates: 27 April – 13 May
- Opened by: Vladimir Putin
- Teams: 16

Final positions
- Champions: Canada (24th title)
- Runners-up: Finland
- Third place: Russia
- Fourth place: Sweden

Tournament statistics
- Games played: 56
- Goals scored: 361 (6.45 per game)
- Attendance: 330,708 (5,906 per game)
- Scoring leader: (Sweden) Johan Davidsson (14 points)

Awards
- MVP: (Canada) Rick Nash

The 2007 IIHF World Championship was held between 27 April and 13 May 2007 in Moscow, Russia. It was the 71st annual world championship event run by the International Ice Hockey Federation (IIHF). The tournament was won by Canada with Rick Nash being named the Most Valuable Player (MVP) of the tournament.

== Participating teams ==
Group A

- Italy (roster)
- Latvia (roster)
- Sweden (roster)
- Switzerland (roster)

Group B

- Austria (roster)
- Belarus (roster)
- Czech Republic (roster)
- United States (roster)

Group C

- Canada (roster)
- Slovakia (roster)
- Germany (roster)
- Norway (roster)

Group D

- Denmark (roster)
- Finland (roster)
- Russia (roster)
- Ukraine (roster)

== Venues ==
Moscow	2007 IIHF World Championship is located in Moscow Ring Road	Mytishchi
Khodynka Arena; Capacity: 12000	2007 IIHF World Championship is located in Moscow Ring Road	Mytishchi Arena; Capacity: 9000

== Rules ==
At the 2007 IIHF World Championships, a three-point system for each game was used. Teams winning in regulation were now awarded three points, and the loser in regulation got none. Where there was a tie score in the Preliminary, Playoff, and Relegation Rounds, teams were given one point each. A five-minute overtime followed and, if the score was still tied after overtime, Game Winning Shots was used. The team winning in overtime or shoot-out was awarded the extra point for a total of two points.

== Preliminary round ==
Team advanced to the qualifying round
Team sent to compete in the Relegation Round

=== Group A ===
Pos	Team	Pld	W	OTW	OTL	L	GF	GA	GD	Pts
1	Sweden	3	3	0	0	0	21	3	+18	9
2	Switzerland	3	2	0	0	1	4	8	−4	6
3	Italy	3	0	1	0	2	6	12	−6	2
4	Latvia	3	0	0	1	2	6	14	−8	1

Source: IIHF

All times local (GMT+4)

28 April 2007; 16:15 (MSD)	Switzerland	2–1 (0 – 0, 2 – 1, 0 – 0)	Latvia	Khodynka Arena, Moscow; Attendance: 6,668

Game reference
A. Wichser 35:50 (ES); S. Jeannin 39:10 (ES) / Goals / 28:25 (ES) L. Dārziņš

28 April 2007; 20:15 (MSD)	Sweden	7–1 (2 – 1, 4 – 0, 1 – 0)	Italy	Khodynka Arena, Moscow; Attendance: 4,420

Game reference
J. Davidsson 15:31 (ES); F. Emvall 17:19 (PP); T. Mårtensson 23:40 (ES); F. Bremberg 25:17 (PP); J. Davidsson 28:43 (ES); J. Hedström 29:53 (ES); P. Hållberg 51:50 (PP) / Goals / 03:07 (PP) G. de Bettin

30 April 2007; 16:15 (MSD)	Switzerland	2–1 (1 – 0, 0 – 0, 1 – 1)	Italy	Khodynka Arena, Moscow; Attendance: 6,520

Game reference
G. Bezina 15:44 (PP); I. Rüthemann 51:57 (ES) / Goals / 44:18 (ES) L. Ansoldi

30 April 2007; 20:15 (MSD)	Latvia	2–8 (0 – 1, 0 – 3, 2 – 4)	Sweden	Khodynka Arena, Moscow; Attendance: 5,250

Game reference
K. Daugaviņš 41:00 (PP); A. Širokovs 42:31 (ES) / Goals / 00:29 (ES) N. Bäckström; 26:28 (ES) J. Åkerman; 28:03 (PP) R. Wallin; 38:15 (ES) F. Bremberg; 43:08 (ES) M. Johansson; 55:13 (ES) P. Hörnqvist; 56:30 (ES) F. Warg; 57:15 (ES) D. Tärnström

2 May 2007; 16:15 (MSD)	Italy	4 – 3 (OT) (0 – 1, 1 – 0, 2 – 2, 1 – 0)	Latvia	Khodynka Arena, Moscow; Attendance: 6,180

Game reference
J. Cirone 23:03 (PP); L. Ansoldi 56:41 (ES); C. Borgatello 57:41 (ES); J. Cirone 64:10 (ES) / Goals / 14:51 (PP) L. Dārziņš; 51:43 (ES) K. Daugaviņš; 58:09 (ES) L. Dārziņš

2 May 2007; 20:15 (MSD)	Sweden	6–0 (0 – 0, 5 – 0, 1 – 0)	Switzerland	Khodynka Arena, Moscow; Attendance: 4900

Game reference
M. Thörnberg 21:00 (ES); A. Strålman 23:46 (PP); P. Hörnqvist 24:43 (PP); J. Davidsson 27:42 (ES); J. Davidsson 38:22 (PP); R. Wallin 47:00 (PP) / Goals

=== Group B ===
Pos	Team	Pld	W	OTW	OTL	L	GF	GA	GD	Pts
1	Czech Republic	3	3	0	0	0	18	6	+12	9
2	United States	3	2	0	0	1	14	7	+7	6
3	Belarus	3	1	0	0	2	8	15	−7	3
4	Austria	3	0	0	0	3	5	17	−12	0

Source: IIHF

All times local (GMT+4)

27 April 2007; 16:15 (MSD)	United States	6–2 (3 – 1, 1 – 1, 2 – 0)	Austria	Mytishchi Arena, Mytishchi; Attendance: 1,900

Game reference
P. Kessel 01:59 (ES); T. Petersen 10:22 (ES); L. Stempniak 17:19 (PP); C. Clark 20:24 (ES); E. Cole 40:14 (ES); B. Bochenski 53:02 (PP) / Goals / 14:51 (ES) R. Divis; 30:51 (ES) O. Setzinger

27 April 2007; 20:15 (MSD)	Belarus	2–8 (1 – 4, 1 – 1, 0 – 3)	Czech Republic	Mytishchi Arena, Mytishchi; Attendance: 5,400

Game reference
O. Antonenko 16:18 (ES); O. Antonenko 27:40 (ES) / Goals / 07:57 (PP) J. Hlinka; 10:19 (PP) D. Výborný; 16:31 (ES) T. Plekanec; 18:41 (SH) R. Olesz; 27:21 (ES) P. Sýkora; 42:27 (ES) T. Plekanec; 45:13 (PP) J. Marek; 45:28 (ES) Z. Irgl

29 April 2007; 16:15 (MSD)	Czech Republic	6–1 (2 – 0, 1 – 1, 3 – 0)	Austria	Mytishchi Arena, Mytishchi; Attendance: 2,500

Game reference
P. Sýkora 03:55 (PP); J. Hlinka 10:04 (ES); P. Čáslava 31:02 (PP); M. Barinka 44:07 (ES); J. Hlinka 48:24 (ES); J. Marek 55:07 (PP) / Goals / 37:08 (PP) R. Divis

29 April 2007; 20:15 (MSD)	United States	5–1 (3 – 0, 2 – 0, 0 – 1)	Belarus	Mytishchi Arena, Mytishchi; Attendance: 3,600

Game reference
J. Johnson 02:40 (ES); L. Stempniak 04:47 (ES); C. LaRose 17:45 (ES); C. Clark 24:30 (ES); L. Stempniak 35:05 (PP) / Goals / 43:31 (ES) O. Antonenko

1 May 2007; 16:15 (MSD)	Austria	2–5 (1 – 2, 1 – 2, 0 – 1)	Belarus	Mytishchi Arena, Mytishchi; Attendance: 4,700

Game reference
A. Lakos 18:40 (PP); A. Lakos 24:26 (PP) / Goals / 03:06 (PP) A. Glebov; 17:48 (ES) D. Dudik; 27:10 (PP) A. Ugarov; 33:14 (PP) O. Antonenko; 54:34 (ES) A. Kulakov

1 May 2007; 20:15 (MSD)	Czech Republic	4–3 (1 – 0, 1 – 1, 2 – 2)	United States	Mytishchi Arena, Mytishchi; Attendance: 6,100

Game reference
P. Čáslava 16:52 (PP); Z. Irgl 34:37 (ES); P. Tenkrát 47:51 (ES); J. Bednář 58:52 (ES) / Goals / 24:42 (PP) R. Suter; 53:59 (SH) C. LaRose; 55:37 (PP) A. Hutchinson

=== Group C ===
Pos	Team	Pld	W	OTW	OTL	L	GF	GA	GD	Pts
1	Canada	3	3	0	0	0	12	8	+4	9
2	Slovakia	3	2	0	0	1	12	6	+6	6
3	Germany	3	1	0	0	2	8	11	−3	3
4	Norway	3	0	0	0	3	5	12	−7	0

Source: IIHF

All times local (GMT+4)

April 28, 2007; 16:15 (MSD)	Germany	2–3 (1 – 1, 1 – 1, 0 – 1)	Canada	Mytishchi Arena, Mytishchi; Attendance: 4,300

Game reference
C. Ullmann 09:51 (ES); R. Dietrich 21:23 (ES) / Goals / 17:39 (ES) J. Mayers; 20:53 (ES) E. Staal; 51:42 (ES) J. Mayers

28 April 2007; 20:15 (MSD)	Slovakia	3–0 (2 – 0, 1 – 0, 0 – 0)	Norway	Mytishchi Arena, Mytishchi; Attendance: 2,800

Game reference
M. Uram 12:00 (ES); Z. Chára 12:51 (ES); B. Radivojevič 37:39 (PP) / Goals

30 April 2007; 16:15 (MSD)	Slovakia	5–1 (1 – 0, 1 – 0, 3 – 1)	Germany	Mytishchi Arena, Mytishchi; Attendance: 3,800

Game reference
P. Podhradský 08:14 (PP); P. Podhradský 22:42 (PP); R. Kapuš 49:15 (ES); M. Gáborík 56:53 (ES); R. Somík 58:16 (ES) / Goals / 47:30 (ES) C. Ullmann

30 April 2007; 20:15 (MSD)	Canada	4–2 (2 – 1, 0 – 1, 2 – 0)	Norway	Mytishchi Arena, Mytishchi; Attendance: 3,300

Game reference
R. Nash 13:24 (PP); J. Chimera 15:17 (ES); S. Doan 40:22 (PP); J. Williams 49:44 (PP) / Goals / 09:29 (ES) L. E. Spets; 32:14 (PP) J. Andersen

2 May 2007; 16:15 (MSD)	Norway	3–5 (0 – 2, 3 – 3, 0 – 0)	Germany	Mytishchi Arena, Mytishchi; Attendance: 2,200

Game reference
M. Trygg 22:08 (ES); M. Ask 23:02 (PP); L. E. Spets 23:50 (ES) / Goals / 08:11 (PP) M. Hackert; 14:45 (PP) M. Wolf; 24:25 (ES) M. Wolf; 26:58 (PP) J. Tripp; 32:51 (ES) A. Bárta

2 May 2007; 20:15 (MSD)	Canada	5–4 (1 – 1, 3 – 2, 1 – 1)	Slovakia	Mytishchi Arena, Mytishchi; Attendance: 6,500

Game reference
C. Murphy 03:39 (PP); J. Mayers 20:25 (ES); E. Brewer 31:27 (PP); D. Hamhuis 35:09 (ES); R. Nash 49:02 (PP) / Goals / 02:05 (PP) M. Jurčina; 33:48 (ES) M. Hossa; 37:37 (ES) M. Uram; 43:38 (ES) M. Šatan

=== Group D ===
Pos	Team	Pld	W	OTW	OTL	L	GF	GA	GD	Pts
1	Russia	3	3	0	0	0	22	6	+16	9
2	Finland	3	2	0	0	1	15	7	+8	6
3	Denmark	3	1	0	0	2	7	18	−11	3
4	Ukraine	3	0	0	0	3	4	17	−13	0

Source: IIHF

All times local (GMT+4)

27 April 2007; 17:15 (MSD)	Ukraine	0–5 (0 – 1, 0 – 3, 0 – 1)	Finland	Khodynka Arena, Moscow; Attendance: 6,500

Game reference
Goals / 12:07 (ES) P. Saravo; 24:06 (ES) S. Bergenheim; 27:18 (PP) T. Pärssinen; 33:08 (PP) T. Pärssinen; 51:28 (SH) P. Kontiola

27 April 2007; 21:15 (MSD)	Russia	9–1 (3 – 1, 5 – 0, 1 – 0)	Denmark	Khodynka Arena, Moscow; Attendance: 12,000

Game reference
D. Zaripov 00:28 (ES); I. Nikulin 03:32 (ES); E. Malkin 03:54 (ES); P. Schastlivy 22:24 (ES); A. Markov 25:38 (PP); A. Morozov 27:20 (ES); N. Kulemin 29:44 (ES); A. Ovechkin 32:13 (ES); A. Frolov 55:43 (PP) / Goals / 17:20 (ES) P. Regin

29 April 2007; 16:15 (MSD)	Finland	6–2 (3 – 1, 1 – 0, 2 – 1)	Denmark	Khodynka Arena, Moscow; Attendance: 6,620

Game reference
P. Nummelin 07:36 (PP); M. Koivu 14:09 (SH); P. Nummelin 18:48 (PP); V. Peltonen 23:28 (PP); A.P. Berg 41:37 (ES); J. Hentunen 50:42 (PP) / Goals / 12:49 (PP) J. Damgaard; 54:43 (ES) C. Kjærgaard

29 April 2007; 20:15 (MSD)	Russia	8–1 (2 – 1, 3 – 0, 3 – 0)	Ukraine	Khodynka Arena, Moscow; Attendance: 6,620

Game reference
A. Morozov 09:38 (PP); S. Zinoviev 12:22 (PP); I. Nikulin 25:15 (ES); V. Proshkin 32:01 (ES); A. Morozov 39:19 (PP); A. Radulov 45:40 (PP); A. Morozov 51:40 (ES); A. Frolov 56:37 (PP) / Goals / 04:00 (PP) S. Klymentiev

1 May 2007; 16:15 (MSD)	Denmark	4–3 (3 – 2, 1 – 0, 0 – 1)	Ukraine	Khodynka Arena, Moscow; Attendance: 6720

Game reference
K. Starkov 01:26 (ES); R. Pander 10:31 (ES); K. Staal 13:13 (ES); K. Staal 30:36 (PP) / Goals / 07:36 (ES) O. Materukhin; 13:39 (ES) O. Matviichuk; 52:23 (ES) V. Zavalniuk

1 May 2007; 20:15 (MSD)	Finland	4–5 (1 – 2, 0 – 2, 3 – 1)	Russia	Khodynka Arena, Moscow; Attendance: 12,000

Game reference
T. Ruutu 13:11 (PP); J. Hentunen 43:37 (ES); J. Lehtinen 48:53 (PP); P. Nummelin 54:09 (PP) / Goals / 06:38 (ES) N. Kulemin; 17:40 (PP) D. Zaripov; 23:49 (PP) S. Gonchar; 26:08 (PP) A. Morozov; 52:21 (ES) P. Schastlivy

== Qualifying round ==
Team advanced to the Final Round

=== Group E ===
Pos	Team	Pld	W	OTW	OTL	L	GF	GA	GD	Pts
1	Russia	5	5	0	0	0	27	10	+17	15
2	Sweden	5	4	0	0	1	21	7	+14	12
3	Finland	5	3	0	0	2	15	8	+7	9
4	Switzerland	5	2	0	0	3	9	16	−7	6
5	Denmark	5	1	0	0	4	11	26	−15	3
6	Italy	5	0	0	0	5	4	20	−16	0

Source: IIHF

Results from Preliminary Round games among the qualified teams carry over.

All times local (GMT+4)

3 May 2007; 16:15 (MSD)	Switzerland	0–2 (0 – 0, 0 – 0, 0 – 2)	Finland	Khodynka Arena, Moscow; Attendance: 5,010

Game reference
Goals / 51:37 (PP) T. Ruutu; 59:46 (EN) V. Peltonen

3 May 2007; 20:15 (MSD)	Denmark	2–5 (2 – 2, 0 – 1, 0 – 2)	Sweden	Khodynka Arena, Moscow; Attendance: 3,800

Game reference
M. Madsen 02:27 (ES); P. Regin 06:40 (PP) / Goals / 13:38 (PP) K. Jönsson; 17:57 (PP) J. Åkerman; 33:49 (PP) J. Davidsson; 57:23 (ES) M. Johansson; 59:53 (SH) J. Davidsson

4 May 2007; 20:15 (MSD)	Russia	3–0 (0 – 0, 1 – 0, 2 – 0)	Italy	Khodynka Arena, Moscow; Attendance: 10,100

Game reference
I. Kovalchuk 34:17 (ES); A. Frolov 53:35 (ES); A. Morozov 59:56 (PP) / Goals

5 May 2007; 16:15 (MSD)	Switzerland	4–1 (1 – 0, 2 – 1, 1 – 0)	Denmark	Khodynka Arena, Moscow; Attendance: 6,200

Game reference
T. Monnet 13:19 (PP); P. DiPietro 26:20 (PP); J. Sprunger 32:06 (ES); J. Sprunger 49:34 (ES) / Goals / 36:41 (PP) J. Damgaard

5 May 2007; 20:15 (MSD)	Finland	3–0 (2 – 0, 0 – 0, 1 – 0)	Italy	Khodynka Arena, Moscow; Attendance: 4,815

Game reference
J. Viuhkola 07:29 (PP); J. Hentunen 18:48 (ES); J. Viuhkola 42:31 (ES) / Goals

6 May 2007; 16:15 (MSD)	Russia	6–3 (2 – 0, 1 – 1, 3 – 2)	Switzerland	Khodynka Arena, Moscow; Attendance: 12,000

Game reference
S. Zinoviev 00:34 (ES); I. Kovalchuk 13:50 (ES); D. Zaripov 29:44 (ES); A. Markov 42:00 (ES); A. Frolov 45:45 (PP); P. Schastlivy 49:32 (ES) / Goals / 38:51 (PP) M. Streit; 42:26 (ES) P. DiPietro; 51:30 (ES) M. Reichert

6 May 2007; 20:15 (MSD)	Sweden	1–0 (1–0, 0–0, 0–0)	Finland	Khodynka Arena, Moscow; Attendance: 7,200

Game reference
J. Åkerman 15.53 (ES) / Goals

7 May 2007; 16:15 (MSD)	Italy	2–5 (0–3, 2–0, 0–2)	Denmark	Khodynka Arena, Moscow; Attendance: 6,000

Game reference
G. de Bettin 30:47 (ES); R. Ramoser 35:58 (ES) / Goals / 03:46 (PP) B. Nordby Tranholm; 04:23 (ES) P. Regin; 06:30 (ES) J. Nielsen; 49:04 (ES) R. Olsen; 55:29 (ES) M. Christensen

7 May 2007; 20:15 (MSD)	Sweden	2–4 (1–1, 1–1, 0–2)	Russia	Khodynka Arena, Moscow; Attendance: 15,000

Game reference
M. Thörnberg 08:43 (PP); A. Steen 38:22 (ES) / Goals / 17:39 (PS) A. Morozov; 23:27 (ES) D. Grebeshkov; 49:51 (ES) E. Malkin; 56:33 (ES) A. Morozov

=== Group F ===
Pos	Team	Pld	W	OTW	OTL	L	GF	GA	GD	Pts
1	Canada	5	4	1	0	0	24	15	+9	14
2	United States	5	3	0	0	2	18	13	+5	9
3	Slovakia	5	3	0	0	2	18	15	+3	9
4	Czech Republic	5	2	0	1	2	17	14	+3	7
5	Germany	5	2	0	0	3	11	16	−5	6
6	Belarus	5	0	0	0	5	14	29	−15	0

Source: IIHF

Results from Preliminary Round games among the qualified teams carry over.

All times local (GMT+4)

3 May 2007; 16:15 (MSD)	United States	4–2 (2 – 1, 2 – 0, 0 – 1)	Slovakia	Mytishchi Arena, Mytishchi; Attendance: 2,000

Game reference
A. Hutchinson 08:17 (ES); D. Backes 12:27 (SH); P. Kessel 24:52 (ES); B. Bochenski 32:37 (PP) / Goals / 13:08 (ES) Z. Chára; 51:21 (ES) M. Gáborík

3 May 2007; 20:15 (MSD)	Germany	2–0 (1 – 0, 0 – 0, 1 – 0)	Czech Republic	Mytishchi Arena, Mytishchi; Attendance: 2,600

Game reference
M. Hackert 19:50 (PP); M. Wolf 58:19 (ES) / Goals

4 May 2007; 16:15 (MSD)	Canada	6–3 (0 – 1, 5 – 0, 1 – 2)	Belarus	Khodynka Arena, Moscow; Attendance: 6,200

Game reference
S. Doan 22:38 (SH); S. Doan 25:15 (PP); J. Toews 28:32 (ES); S. Doan 29:13 (ES); M. Cammalleri 36:20 (ES); M. Lombardi 56:15 (ES) / Goals / 08:43 (PP) A. Ugarov; 49:58 (ES) A. Ryadinsky; 58:53 (PP) D. Meleshko

5 May 2007; 16:15 (MSD)	United States	3–0 (1 – 0, 1 – 0, 1 – 0)	Germany	Mytishchi Arena, Mytishchi; Attendance: 2,200

Game reference
P. Stastny 02:33 (PP); P. Stastny 35:26 (ES); L. Stempniak 43:31 (ES) / Goals

5 May 2007; 20:15 (MSD)	Czech Republic	2–3 (1 – 0, 0 – 2, 1 – 1)	Slovakia	Mytishchi Arena, Mytishchi; Attendance: 3,400

Game reference
T. Plekanec 08:02 (PP); R. Klesla 54:03 (ES) / Goals / 22:24 (ES) P. Demitra; 30:44 (ES) R. Kapuš; 53:18 (ES) M. Gáborík

6 May 2007; 16:15 (MSD)	Slovakia	4–3 (1 – 1, 2 – 2, 1 – 0)	Belarus	Mytishchi Arena, Mytishchi; Attendance: 2,800

Game reference
Z. Chára 11:57 (PP); M. Gáborík 22:14 (ES); M. Gáborík 24:33 (ES); P. Demitra 59:21 (EN) / Goals / 15:53 (ES) A. Ugarov; 33:47 (ES) O. Antonenko; 34:17 (ES) K. Koltsov

6 May 2007; 20:15 (MSD)	Czech Republic	3 – 4 (OT) (1 – 0, 1 – 1, 1 – 2) (0–1)	Canada	Mytishchi Arena, Mytishchi; Attendance: 6,500

Game reference
M. Židlický 13:17 (PP); T. Plekanec 32:05 (PP); R. Olesz 46:39 (PP) / Goals / 22:15 (ES) J. McClement; 43:22 (ES) E. Staal; 50:57 (ES) S. Doan; 60:23 (ES) E. Staal

7 May 2007; 16:15 (MSD)	Belarus	5–6 (2 – 3, 2 – 1, 1 – 2)	Germany	Mytishchi Arena, Mytishchi; Attendance: 2,000

Game reference
D. Meleshko 01:07 (ES); A. Kulakov 18:58 (ES); D. Dudik 26:25 (SH); K. Koltsov 33:43 (ES); V. Kostyuchenok 58:58 (ES) / Goals / 05:50 (ES) M. Hackert; 12:08 (PP) A. Barta; 17:53 (PP) R. Dietrich; 25:19 (PP) S. Felski; 45:24 (PP) M. Wolf; 53:55 (ES) M. Wolf

7 May 2007; 20:15 (MSD)	Canada	6–3 (4 – 0, 1 – 2, 1 – 1)	United States	Mytishchi Arena, Mytishchi; Attendance: 5,500

Game reference
J. McClement 00:08 (ES); M. Cammalleri 02:05 (PP); M. Lombardi 12:48 (ES); M. Cammalleri 13:25 (ES); M. Lombardi 35:19 (ES); M. Lombardi 51:58 (ES) / Goals / 29:47 (ES) P. Stastny; 37:49 (ES) L. Stempniak; 53:42 (ES) P. Stastny

== Relegation round ==
The top two teams in the standings after the round-robin were invited back to the 2008 IIHF World Championship, while the bottom two teams were relegated to the 2008 IIHF Division I Tournament.

Team relegated to Division I

=== Group G ===
Pos	Team	Pld	W	OTW	OTL	L	GF	GA	GD	Pts
1	Latvia	3	2	0	0	1	14	8	+6	6
2	Norway	3	1	1	0	1	12	9	+3	5
3	Austria	3	1	0	1	1	11	12	−1	4
4	Ukraine	3	1	0	0	2	7	15	−8	3

Source: IIHF

All times local (GMT+4)

4 May 2007; 16:15 (MSD)	Austria	2–3 (OT) (0 – 0, 1 – 2, 1 – 0, 0 – 1)	Norway	Mytishchi Arena, Mytishchi; Attendance: 1,500

Game reference
R. Lukas 29:19 (PP); D. Welser 42:26 (PP) / Goals / 32:19 (PP) J. Andersen; 37:10 (PP) A. Bastiansen; 62:22 (ES) M. Ask

4 May 2007; 20:15 (MSD)	Latvia	5–0 (2 – 0, 2 – 0, 1 – 0)	Ukraine	Mytishchi Arena, Mytishchi; Attendance: 2,100

Game reference
M. Cipulis 08:58 (ES); A. Saviels 17:32 (PP); O. Sorokins 21:15 (ES); O. Sorokins 34:41 (PP); M. Rēdlihs 47:00 (ES) / Goals

6 May 2007; 12:15 (MSD)	Latvia	5–1 (1 – 0, 1 – 0, 3 – 1)	Austria	Khodynka Arena, Moscow; Attendance: 6,150

Game reference
K. Daugaviņš 06:30 (PP); A. Ņiživijs 28:34 (ES); H. Vasiļjevs 43:24 (ES); R. Laviņš 47:12 (PP); L. Tambijevs 49:37 (PP) / Goals / 42:06 (ES) M. Stewart

6 May 2007; 12:15 (MSD)	Ukraine	3–2 (1 – 0, 1 – 2, 1 – 0)	Norway	Mytishchi Arena, Mytishchi; Attendance: 1,700

Game reference
D. Tsyrul 14:01 (PP); O. Blagoi 32:34 (PP); Y. Navarenko 48:52 (PP) / Goals / 28:10 (PP) P. Thoresen; 38:17 (PP) M. Trygg

7 May 2007; 12:15 (MSD)	Austria	8–4 (3 – 1, 3 – 2, 2 – 1)	Ukraine	Khodynka Arena, Moscow; Attendance: 6,020

Game reference
T. Koch 06:16 (PP); D. Kalt 12:58 (PP); P. Lukas 14:24 (PP); T. Koch 24:16 (ES); P. Lukas 24:48 (ES); A. Lakos 27:58 (ES); M. Peintner 42:59 (ES); M. Peintner 46:55 (SH) / Goals / 18:46 (PP) V. Lyutkevych; 23:31 (PP) O. Bobkin; 37:26 (ES) D. Tsyrul; 54:18 (ES) R. Salnikov

7 May 2007; 12:15 (MSD)	Norway	7–4 (3 – 2, 3 – 0, 1 – 2)	Latvia	Mytishchi Arena, Mytishchi; Attendance: 1,000

Game reference
A. Bastiansen 03:28 (ES); L.E. Lund 05:03 (PP); M. Ask 10:33 (PP); M. Hansen 27:30 (PP); A. Bastiansen 29:17 (PP); M. Hansen 32:23 (PP); A. Bastiansen 57:27 (ES) / Goals / 16:09 (ES) H. Vasiļjevs; 17:42 (ES) G. Galvins; 40:49 (ES) A. Bērziņš; 58:33 (ES) A. Semjonovs

== Play off ==
=== Draw ===
Quarterfinals
E1	Russia	4
F4	Czech Republic	0
F2	United States	4
E3	Finland	5
F1	Canada	5
E4	Switzerland	1
E2	Sweden	7
F3	Slovakia	4

Semifinals
QF1	Russia	1
QF2	Finland	2
QF3	Canada	4
QF4	Sweden	1

Finals
SF1	Finland	2
SF2	Canada	4
Bronze-medal game
SF1	Russia	3
SF2	Sweden	1

=== Quarterfinals ===
All times local (GMT+4)

9 May 2007; 16:15 (MSD)	Russia	4–0 (1 – 0, 0 – 0, 3 – 0)	Czech Republic	Khodynka Arena, Moscow; Attendance: 12,000

Game reference
A. Markov 06:48 (PP); E. Malkin 40:23 (PP); A. Radulov 51:24 (ES); E. Malkin 54:46 (ES) / Goals

9 May 2007; 20:15 (MSD)	Sweden	7–4 (1 – 2, 3 – 0, 3 – 2)	Slovakia	Khodynka Arena, Moscow; Attendance: 7,000

Game reference
F. Warg 07:28 (ES); J. Hedström 22:17 (ES); T. Mårtensson 26:02 (ES); J. Hedström 33:55 (PP); T. Mårtensson 47:03 (ES); M. Johansson 49:46 (PP); T. Mårtensson 59:45 (EN) / Goals / 02:10 (PP) M. Hossa; 08:16 (ES) R. Kapuš; 41:21 (ES) B. Radivojevič; 51:27 (ES) R. Kukumberg

10 May 2007; 16:15 (MSD)	Canada	5–1 (1 – 0, 2 – 1, 2 – 0)	Switzerland	Khodynka Arena, Moscow; Attendance: 6,000

Game reference
M. Lombardi 15:22 (ES); J. Mayers 29:05 (ES); R. Nash 34:40 (PP); M. Lombardi 46:03 (PP); S. Weber 57:31 (ES) / Goals / 29:43 (ES) P. DiPietro

10 May 2007; 20:15 (MSD)	United States	4–5 (GWS) (0 – 1, 3 – 3, 1 – 0, 0 – 0, 0 – 1)	Finland	Khodynka Arena, Moscow; Attendance: 6,500

Game reference
T. Petersen 20:48 (SH); T. Arnason 27:05 (ES); L. Stempniak 34:08 (ES); A. Hutchinson 54:20 (PP) / Goals / 17:03 (ES) T. Ruutu; 24:33 (ES) P. Saravo; 30:27 (ES) J. Viuhkola; 35:32 (PP) T. Kallio; 70:00 (PS) J. Lehtinen

=== Semifinals ===
All times local (GMT+4)

12 May 2007; 15:15 (MSD)	Russia	1–2 (OT) (1 – 1, 0 – 0, 0 – 0, 0 – 1)	Finland	Khodynka Arena, Moscow; Attendance: 12,000

Game reference
E. Malkin 08:36 (PP) / Goals / 12:06 (SH) J. Hentunen; 65:40 (ES) M. Koivu

12 May 2007; 19:15 (MSD)	Canada	4–1 (3 – 0, 1 – 1, 0 – 0)	Sweden	Khodynka Arena, Moscow; Attendance: 8,000

Game reference
M. Cammalleri 11:05 (PP); J. Toews 12:23 (ES); E. Staal 18:38 (ES); R. Nash 35:17 (PP) / Goals / J. Davidsson 26:13 (ES)

=== Bronze-medal game ===
All times local (GMT+4)

13 May 2007; 16:15 (MSD)	Russia	3–1 (2 – 0, 1 – 0, 0 – 1)	Sweden	Khodynka Arena, Moscow; Attendance: 7,500

Game reference
A. Emelin 06:18 (SH); S. Zinoviev 09:39 (ES); A. Frolov 21:04 (PP) / Goals / 48:08 (PP) A. Steen

=== Gold-medal game ===
All times local (GMT+4)

13 May 2007; 20:15 (MSD)	Canada	4–2 (2 – 0, 1 – 0, 1 – 2)	Finland	Khodynka Arena, Moscow; Attendance: 12,000

Game reference
R. Nash 06:10 (PP); E. Staal 13:48 (PP); C. Armstrong 29:11 (ES); R. Nash 58:54 (ES) / Goals / 51:08 (ES) P. Kontiola; 57:44 (ES) A. Miettinen

== Ranking and statistics ==
=== Champions ===
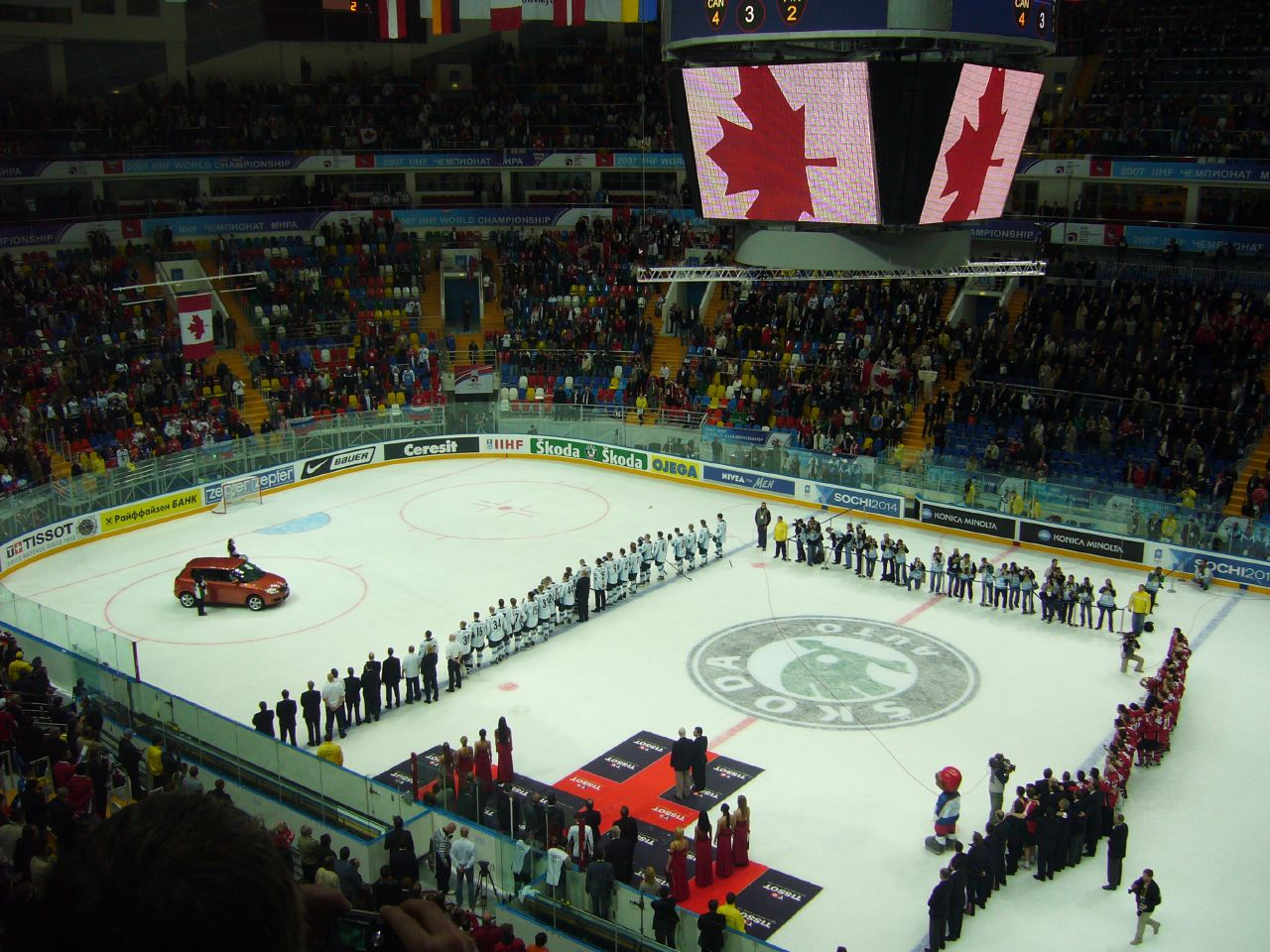
IIHF world championship medal ceremony

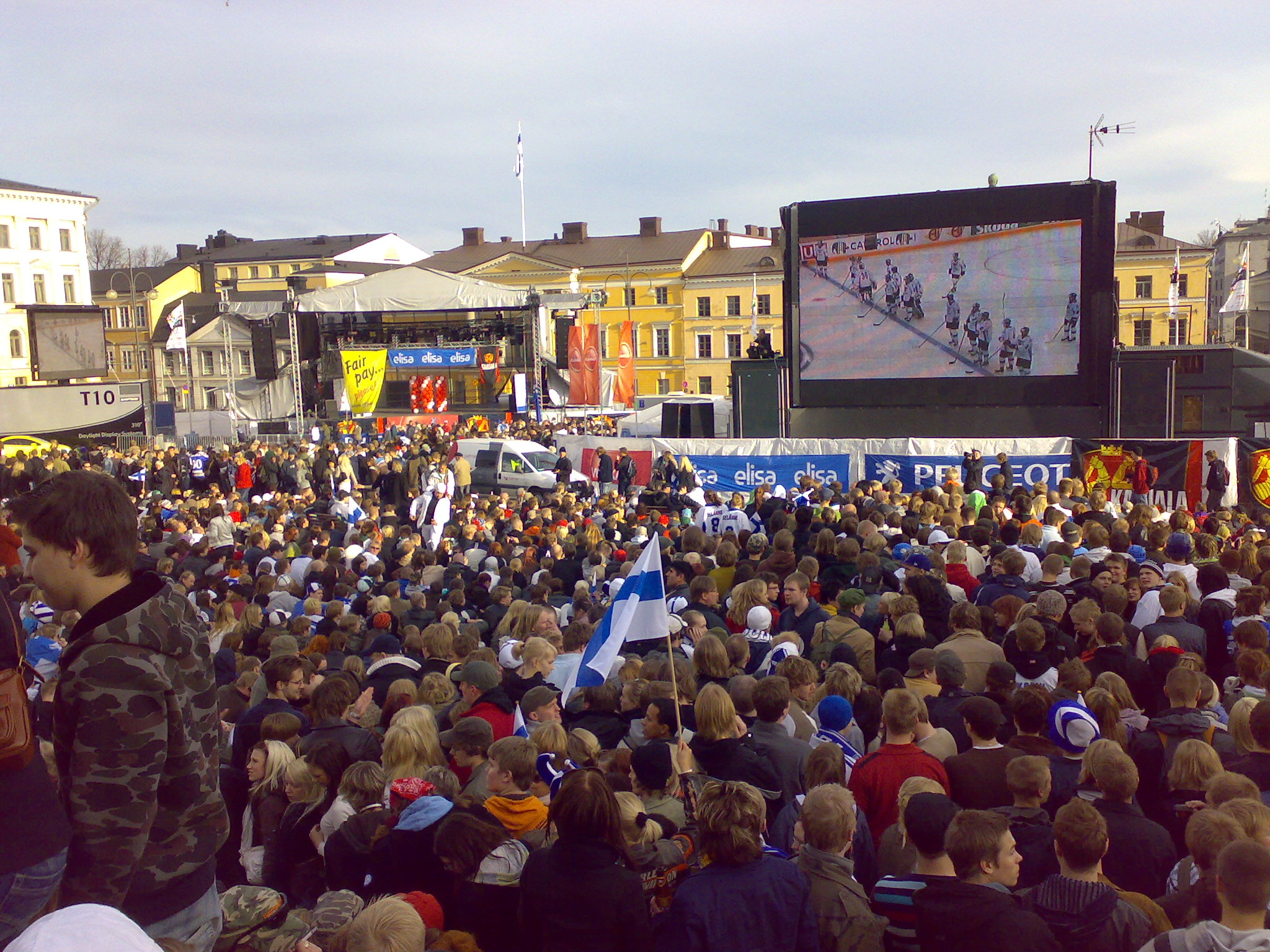
People watching 2007 IIHF world championship Final in Helsinki

2007 IIHF World Championship winners

Canada
24th title

=== Tournament Awards ===
- Best players selected by the directorate:
  - Best Goaltender: (Finland) Kari Lehtonen
  - Best Defenceman: (Russia) Andrei Markov
  - Best Forward: (Russia) Alexei Morozov
  - Most Valuable Player: (Canada) Rick Nash
- Media All-Star Team:
  - Goaltender: (Finland) Kari Lehtonen
  - Defence: (Russia) Andrei Markov, (Finland) Petteri Nummelin
  - Forward: (Russia) Evgeni Malkin, (Russia) Alexei Morozov, (Canada) Rick Nash

=== Final standings ===
The final standings of the tournament according to IIHF:

Rk.	Team
1st place, gold medalist(s)	Canada
2nd place, silver medalist(s)	Finland
3rd place, bronze medalist(s)	Russia
4.	Sweden
5.	United States
6.	Slovakia
7.	Czech Republic
8.	Switzerland
9.	Germany
10.	Denmark
11.	Belarus
12.	Italy
13.	Latvia
14.	Norway
15.	Austria
16.	Ukraine

=== Scoring leaders ===
Player	GP	G	A	Pts	±	PIM	POS
(Sweden) Johan Davidsson	9	7	7	14	+3	2	FW
(Russia) Aleksey Morozov	7	8	5	13	+9	6	FW
(Russia) Sergei Zinovjev	9	3	10	13	+10	12	FW
(Canada) Matthew Lombardi	9	6	6	12	+4	4	FW
(Russia) Danis Zaripov	9	3	9	12	+10	6	FW
(Canada) Rick Nash	9	6	5	11	+8	4	FW
(Slovakia) Marián Gáborík	6	5	6	11	+6	14	FW
(Russia) Alexander Frolov	9	5	6	11	+4	0	FW
(Sweden) Tony Mårtensson	9	4	7	11	+8	8	FW
(United States) Lee Stempniak	7	6	4	10	+2	27	FW

GP = Games played; G = Goals; A = Assists; Pts = Points; ± = Plus/minus; PIM = Penalties in minutes; POS = Position

=== Leading goaltenders ===
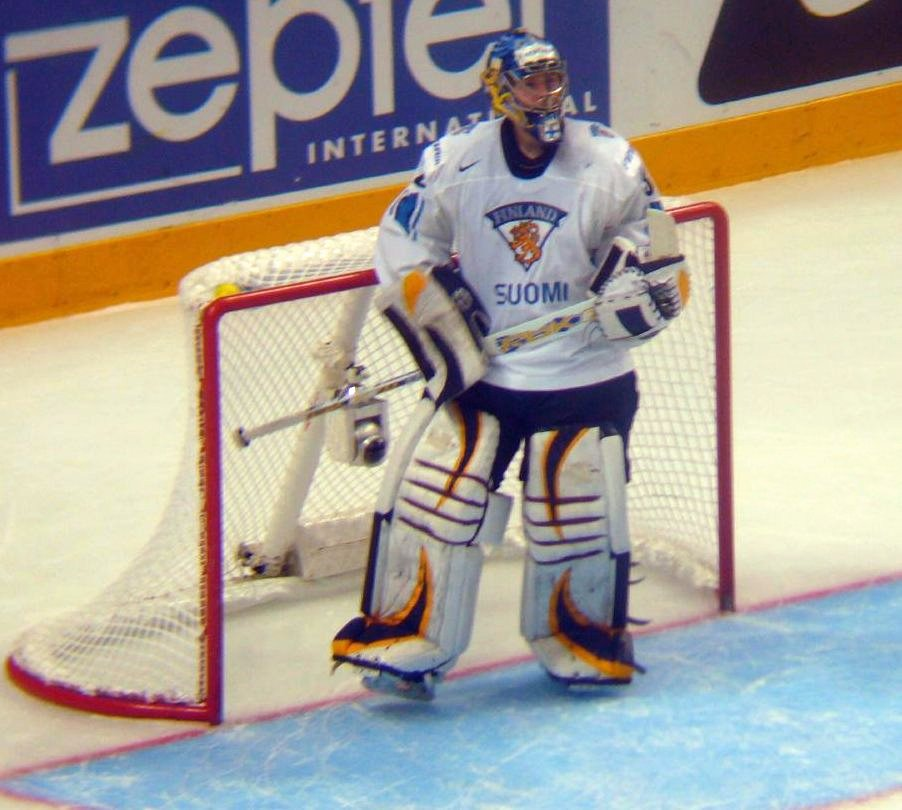
Kari Lehtonen in Semi-finals

Player	MINS	SA	GA	GAA	Sv%	SO
(Russia) Alexander Eremenko	366	139	6	0.98	95.7	2
(Canada) Cam Ward	300	129	11	2.20	91.5	0
(Finland) Kari Lehtonen	374	138	12	1.93	91.3	1
(Canada) Dwayne Roloson	240	111	10	2.50	91.0	0
(Switzerland) Jonas Hiller	359	167	15	2.51	91.0	0

MINS = Minutes (on ice); SA = Shots against; GA = Goals against; GAA = Goals against average; Sv% = Save percentage; SO = Shutouts

== IIHF Broadcasting rights ==
- Austria
  - Austrian Matches: ORF
  - Other Matches: ORF Sport Plus
- Canada
  - English: TSN
  - French: RDS
- Czech Republic: Czech Television (ČT2, ČT4 Sport)
- Denmark: TV2 Sport
- Finland: YLE
- France: Sport+
- Germany
  - German Matches: ARD, ZDF
  - Other Matches: DSF
- Latvia: TV3, TV6 Latvia, 3+ Latvia
- Norway
  - Norwegian Matches: NRK
  - Other Matches: Viasat SportN, Viasat Sport 3
- Russia: RTR Sport
- Slovakia: STV
- Slovenia: RTV Slovenija
- Sweden: Viasat
- Switzerland
  - German: SF zwei
  - French: TSR 2
  - Italian: TSI 2
- Ukraine: Megasport

== IIHF honors and awards ==
The 2007 IIHF Hall of Fame induction ceremony has held in Moscow during the World Championships. Bob Nadin of Canada was given the Paul Loicq Award for outstanding contributions to international ice hockey.

IIHF Hall of Fame inductees

- Veniamin Alexandrov, Russia
- Vladimír Bouzek, Czech Republic
- Luděk Bukač, Czech Republic
- Josef Černý, Czech Republic
- Igor Dmitriev, Russia
- Hans Dobida, Austria
- Jakob Kölliker, Switzerland
- Viktor Konovalenko, Russia
- Konstantin Loktev, Russia
- Esa Peltonen, Finland
- Thomas Rundqvist, Sweden
- Vyacheslav Starshinov, Russia

== See also ==
- 2007 in ice hockey
