= Gizzatullin =

Gizzatullin (masculine) or Gizzatullina (feminine) (Tatar: Гыйззәтуллин/Ğizzätullin, Bashkir: Ғиззәтуллин/Ğizzätullin, Russian: Гиззатуллин) is a Tatar and Bashkir common modern surname of originally Arabic origin. The surname is Russian adaptation of the Tatar and Bashkir first name Gizzatulla (Tatar: Гыйззәтулла/Ğizzätulla, Bashkir: Ғиззәтулла/Ğizzätulla), which is the form of the Arabic name Izzatullah, translated as 'majesty', 'honor' and 'might' of Allah. Corrupted variations: Gizzatulin/Izzatulin, Gizatullin/Izatullin/Zatullin, Gizatulin/Izatulin/Zatulin/Tulin. The native form of the surname is Gizzatulla.

== Notable people with the surname Gizzatullin or Gizzatullina ==
- Sahibjamal Gizzatullina-Voljskaya (1892–1974), actress, producer;
- Tazi Gizzat (1895–1955), writer, dramatist;
- Abdulla Gizatullin (1904–1945), guards-sergeant, Hero of the Soviet Union;
- Bayan Gizzat (1918–1991), scientist;
- Ibragim Gizzatullin (1918–1992), writer;
- Bulat Gizatullin (1920–1989), journalist, culture worker of the Tatar ASSR and RSFSR (1970), honoured worker of arts. The Minister of culture of the Tatar ASSR (04.11.1961 - 03.04.1973), Director of the Kazan Circus, Participant of the Great Patriotic War;
- Khamazan Gizatullin (1921–2007), gun commander, senior sergeant, colonel, Hero of the Soviet Union;
- Minulla Gizatulin (1925–1993), Hero of the Soviet Union;
- Nur Gizzatullin (born 1928), specialist in study of literature, critic;
- Khamid Gizatullin (born 1932), Soviet and Russian economist, doctor of Economics, Professor, corresponding member of the Russian Academy of Sciences, Advisor of the Russian Academy of Sciences;
- Bayazit Gizatullin (1936–2011), soviet sportsman, master of sport international class in cross country skiing;
- Rafis Gizzatullin (1955–2011), writer, journalist;
- Rif Gizzatullin (born 1957), military commander, Major-General, Hero of the Russian Federation, Candidate of Juridical Sciences;
- Gulsira Gizzatullina (born 1957), Bashkir writer, journalist, translator. The writers 'Union of Bashkortostan (1996) and the Soviet Union" member of the Union of journalists. Honored art worker of the Republic of Bashkortostan, laureate of the award named after Rami Garipov, winner of the international competition named after Mahmud Kashgari and the laureate of the international competition stage;
- Rustam Gizzatullin (born 1974), singer, composer, producer;
- Ildar Gizatullin (born 1976), footballer and manager from the Russian Federation;
- Rinat Gizatulin (born 1980), Deputy Minister of natural resources and ecology of the Russian Federation, state Counsellor of the Russian Federation of 1 class, candidate of historical Sciences, signed on behalf of Russia the Minamata Convention on Mercury in 2014;
- Denis Gizatullin (born 1983), motorcycle speedway rider from the Russian Federation.
- Leysan Gizatullina (born 198x), a ballet dancer, a Golden mask (Russian award) nominee (2013).
