= Izzatullah =

Izzatullah (عزت الله), also spelled Ezzatullah or Ezatullah, is a common masculine Muslim given name, formed from the elements Izzat and Allah, originally of Arabic origin and meaning 'majesty', 'honor' and 'might' of Allah.

The name is widespread among Muslim Turkic peoples in the form of the first names Izzatulla, Izzatullo, and Gizzatulla (Ğizzätulla), as well as adopted in Russian in the form of the Turkic family names Izzatulloev, Izzatullaev, Gizzatullin (corrupted versions: Gizzatulin/Izzatulin, Gizatullin/Izatullin, Gizatulin/Izatulin). Variants of the name are Ayzatulla and Ayzat.

In Turkish the name is İzzetullah.

== List of people with the given name Izzatullah ==
- Izzatullah Bengali, 18th-century Persian author
- Ezatullah (Nangarhar), Afghan militia leader who helped set up a provisional government after the Taliban retreated in November 2001 from Nangarhar Province
- Ezatullah Haqqani, Afghan member of the Taliban's Council
- Izzatullah Wasifi (born 1958), chief of Afghanistan's General Independent Administration of Anti Corruption, formerly governor of Herat Province
- Ezatullah Zawab, Afghan journalist who was kidnapped in retaliation for publishing an article critical of local clerics
- Mullah Ezat or Ezatullah, Afghan commander from Paghman district in Kabul Province and ally of Abdul Rasul Sayyaf who participated in the Afshar Operation
- Hiztullah Yar Nasrat or Izatullah Nasrat Yar, Afghan held in Guantanamo
- Izatullah Dawlatzai (born 1991), Afghan cricketer
- Ezatullah, Afghan cricketer
- Ezzatollah Pourghaz, Iranian Turkmen Football Player
