= Alexander Frolov =

Russian ice hockey player (born 1982)

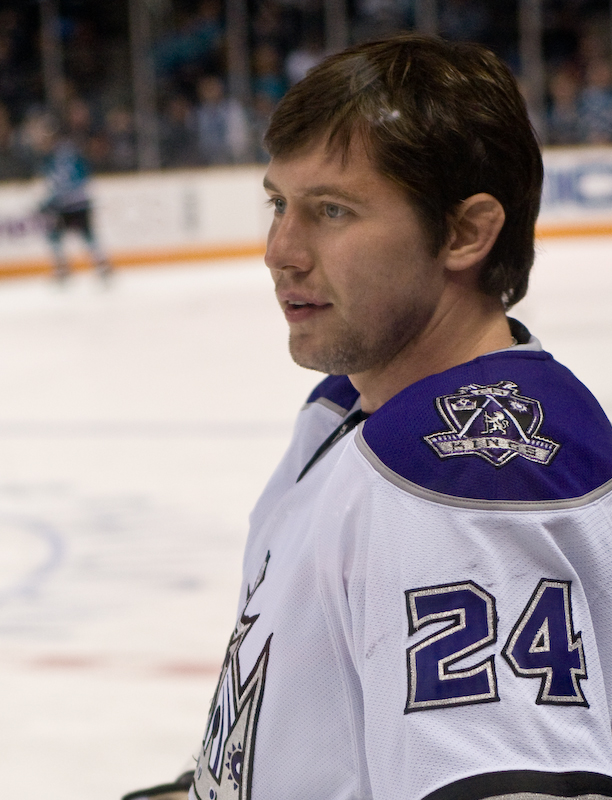
- Frolov with the Los Angeles Kings in 2008
- Born: June 19, 1982 (age 44) Moscow, Russian SFSR, Soviet Union
- Height: 6 ft 2 in (188 cm)
- Weight: 231 lb (105 kg; 16 st 7 lb)
- Position: Left wing
- Shot: Right
- Played for: Spartak Moscow; Krylya Sovetov Moscow; Los Angeles Kings; CSKA Moscow; Dynamo Moscow; New York Rangers; Avangard Omsk; Torpedo Nizhny Novgorod; Amur Khabarovsk
- National team: Russia
- NHL draft: 20th overall, 2000; Los Angeles Kings
- Playing career: 1999–2018

Alexander Alexandrovich Frolov (Russian: Александр Александрович Фролов; born June 19, 1982) is a Russian retired professional ice hockey player. In an eight-year National Hockey League (NHL) career, he played with the Los Angeles Kings and the New York Rangers. After Frolov's NHL career ended, he moved to the KHL with Avangard Omsk and CSKA Moscow.

== Playing career ==
Frolov was drafted by the Los Angeles Kings in the first round, 20th overall, in the 2000 NHL entry draft. He had been playing in Russia's third-tier hockey league with Lokomotiv-2 Yaroslavl, then stayed in Russia for two more seasons, moving up to the second-tier Russian Supreme League (RSL) and first-tier Russian Super League (RSL) with Krylya Sovetov Moscow.

Signed to a three-year contract with the Kings in July 2002, Frolov made his NHL debut in 2002 for the Kings, scoring his first NHL goal, a game-winner, in his seventh game on October 25 against Mike Richter of the New York Rangers. Frolov finished his rookie season with 14 goals and 31 points. After improving to a team-high 24 goals and 48 points the following season, Frolov returned to the Russian Super League in 2004–05 due to the NHL lockout. He began the season with CSKA Moscow and finished second in team scoring to Nikolay Zherdev, despite completing the campaign with Dynamo Moscow.

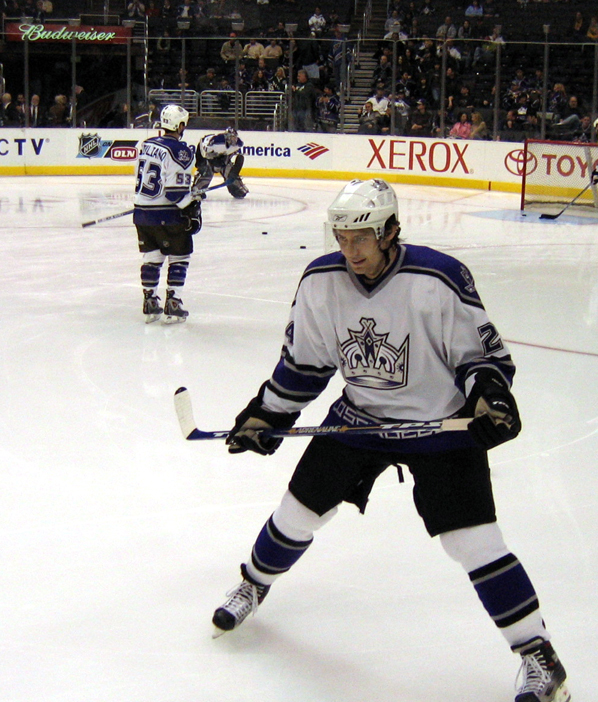
Frolov warming up prior to a Kings game in 2006.

Frolov became a restricted free agent before the 2005–06 season and after turning down a three-year deal, he signed a longer, five-year, $14.5 million contract in August 2005. In the first year of his new contract, he scored his first NHL hat-trick on November 13, 2005, in an 8–2 victory over the Columbus Blue Jackets. Later that season, Frolov was named to Russia's 2006 Winter Olympic team in Turin, where he suffered a partially separated shoulder. He missed approximately a month with the Kings when he returned, but still managed a 54-point season in 69 games.

In 2006–07, Frolov continued to improve and recorded a career-high 35 goals and 71 points, second in team point-scoring to Michael Cammalleri. He finished second in team-scoring for the second consecutive year to Anže Kopitar in 2007–08 with 67 points, despite missing 11 games due to a groin injury suffered in November.

An unrestricted free agent after the 2009–10 season, Frolov signed with the New York Rangers on July 27, 2010, on a one-year, $3 million contract. On January 8, 2011, he suffered a torn anterior cruciate ligament (ACL) of the right knee after forward Brad Winchester fell over Frolov's leg. The injury forced him to miss the remainder of the 2010–11 season after he underwent surgery to repair the damage. Frolov registered seven goals and nine assists for 16 points, along with eight penalty minutes, in 43 games during his only season with the Rangers.

On May 12, 2011, Frolov left the NHL and signed a three-year contract with Russian team Avangard Omsk of the KHL. On November 5, 2013, Avangard Omsk traded Frolov and Stanislav Egorshev to CSKA Moscow in exchange for Sergei Shirokov and Maxim Goncharov.

On September 15, 2014, Frolov announced his retirement from professional hockey, citing the effect of knee injuries he had sustained since 2011. However, after a season out of the game, Frolov returned on July 7, 2015, signing a one-year contract with his former club Torpedo Nizhny Novgorod of the KHL.

In July 2018, after seven seasons in the KHL, Frolov signed with South Korean club Daemyung Killer Whales from Songdo, Incheon of the Asia League Ice Hockey (ALIH).

== International play ==
Medal record

Representing Russia

Men's ice hockey

World Championships
Gold medal – first place	2009 Bern	
Silver medal – second place	2010 Germany	
Bronze medal – third place	2007 Moscow	

World Junior Championships
Gold medal – first place	2002 Czech Republic	

Frolov represented Russia on two occasions as a junior at the 2000 World Junior U18 Championships in Switzerland and 2001 World Junior Championships in the Czech Republic, where he earned a gold medal. He scored a goal in the 5–4 gold medal game victory over Canada and finished with a team-high six goals and eight points in seven games.

After completing his rookie season with the Los Angeles Kings, Frolov debuted at the senior level with Russia at the 2003 World Championships and scored five points as Russia failed to medal. He made his second World Championships appearance in 2007, tallying an international personal best 11 points in nine games. Playing as the host nation, Russia earned bronze defeating Sweden 3–1 in the bronze medal game.

Frolov also competed in the 2004 World Cup, where he managed two assists in four games. He was selected to his first Winter Olympics for the 2006 games in Turin. However, Frolov was injured early in the tournament, suffering a partially separated shoulder in a round-robin game against Kazakhstan. He missed the remainder of Russia's games as they were defeated 3–0 by Finland in the semi-final game.

Frolov was selected as a reserve by Russia for the 2010 Winter Olympics in Vancouver should an injury occur during the tournament.

== Career statistics ==
=== Regular season and playoffs ===
			Regular season					Playoffs
Season	Team	League	GP	G	A	Pts	PIM	GP	G	A	Pts	PIM
1999–2000	Lokomotiv–2 Yaroslavl	RUS.3	25	11	13	24	10	—	—	—	—	—
2000–01	Krylya Sovetov Moscow	RUS.2	44	20	19	39	8	14	8	8	16	4
2001–02	Krylya Sovetov–2 Moscow	RUS.3	2	0	0	0	4	—	—	—	—	—
2001–02	Krylya Sovetov Moscow	RSL	42	18	13	31	16	3	1	0	1	2
2002–03	Los Angeles Kings	NHL	79	14	17	31	34	—	—	—	—	—
2003–04	Los Angeles Kings	NHL	77	24	24	48	24	—	—	—	—	—
2004–05	CSKA Moscow	RSL	42	20	17	37	10	—	—	—	—	—
2004–05	Dynamo Moscow	RSL	6	2	1	3	2	6	2	1	3	0
2005–06	Los Angeles Kings	NHL	69	21	33	54	40	—	—	—	—	—
2006–07	Los Angeles Kings	NHL	82	35	36	71	34	—	—	—	—	—
2007–08	Los Angeles Kings	NHL	71	23	44	67	22	—	—	—	—	—
2008–09	Los Angeles Kings	NHL	77	32	27	59	30	—	—	—	—	—
2009–10	Los Angeles Kings	NHL	81	19	32	51	26	6	1	3	4	0
2010–11	New York Rangers	NHL	43	7	9	16	8	—	—	—	—	—
2011–12	Avangard Omsk	KHL	54	12	12	24	16	21	2	2	4	10
2012–13	Avangard Omsk	KHL	47	13	28	41	10	10	0	3	3	2
2013–14	Avangard Omsk	KHL	22	3	8	11	4	—	—	—	—	—
2013–14	CSKA Moscow	KHL	29	6	3	9	6	4	1	0	1	2
2015–16	Torpedo Nizhny Novgorod	KHL	47	6	13	19	14	8	3	0	3	4
2016–17	Torpedo Nizhny Novgorod	KHL	34	7	11	18	20	2	1	0	1	4
2017–18	Amur Khabarovsk	KHL	47	6	4	10	35	2	0	0	0	0
2018–19	Daemyung Killer Whales	ALH	32	16	12	28	12	3	0	2	2	0
NHL totals			579	175	222	397	218	6	1	3	4	0
KHL totals			280	53	79	132	105	47	7	5	12	22

=== International ===
Year	Team	Event	Result	GP	G	A	Pts	PIM
2000	Russia	WJC18	2nd place, silver medalist(s)	6	5	1	6	10
2002	Russia	WJC	1st place, gold medalist(s)	7	6	2	8	4
2003	Russia	WC	5th	7	3	2	5	6
2004	Russia	WCH	5th	4	0	2	2	2
2006	Russia	OG	4th	6	0	1	1	0
2007	Russia	WC	3rd place, bronze medalist(s)	9	5	6	11	0
2009	Russia	WC	1st place, gold medalist(s)	7	3	1	4	2
2010	Russia	WC	2nd place, silver medalist(s)	8	0	1	1	2
Junior totals				13	11	3	14	14
Senior totals				41	11	13	24	12

Awards and achievements
Preceded by Mathieu Biron	Los Angeles Kings first-round draft pick 2000	Succeeded by Jens Karlsson
