= Jaroslav Hlinka =

Czech ice hockey player (born 1976)

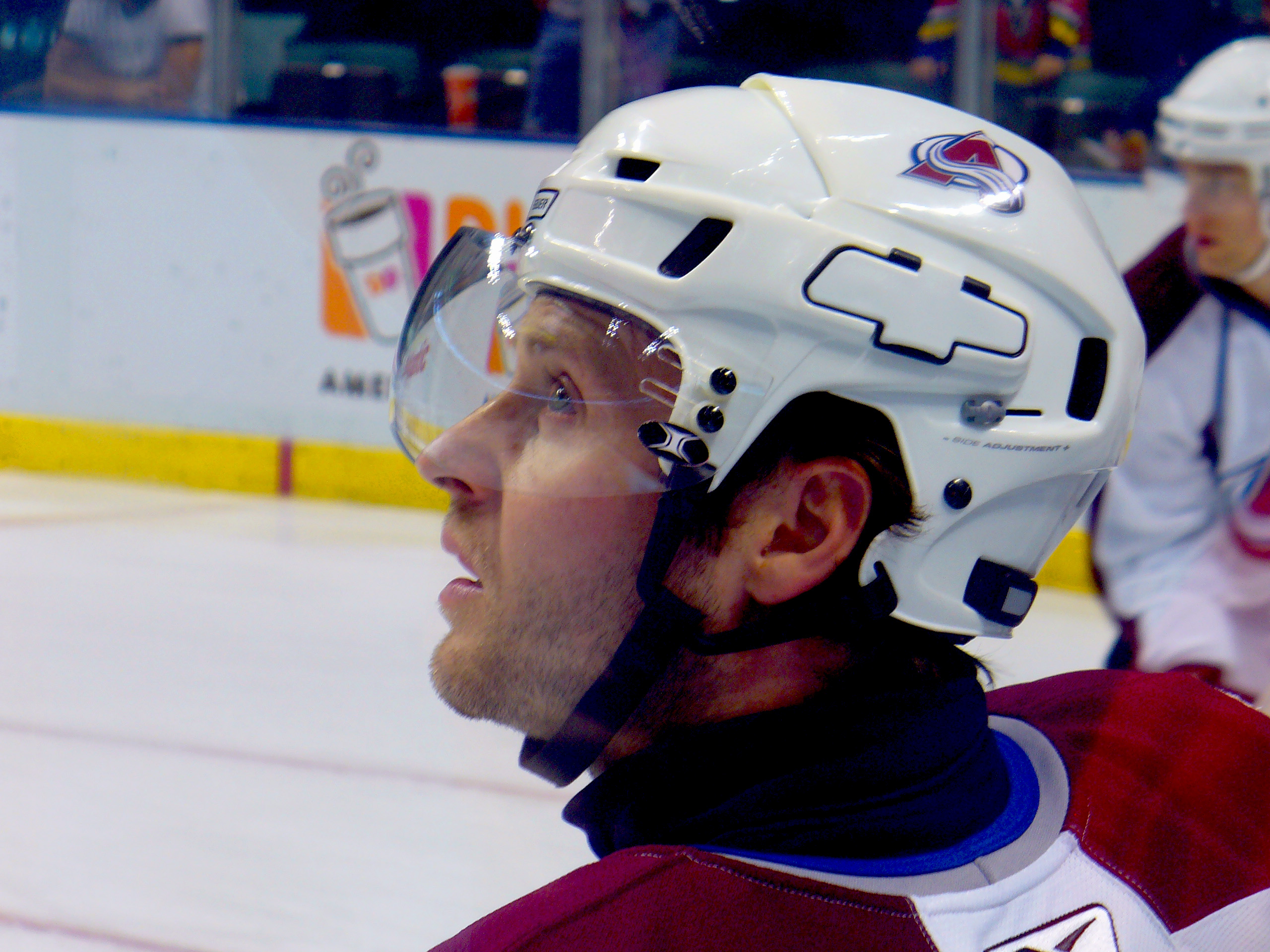
- Hlinka with the Colorado Avalanche in 2008
- Born: November 10, 1976 (age 49) Prague, Czechoslovakia
- Height: 5 ft 10 in (178 cm)
- Weight: 172 lb (78 kg; 12 st 4 lb)
- Position: Centre
- Shot: Left
- Played for: HC Sparta Praha; Kloten Flyers; Ak Bars Kazan; Colorado Avalanche; Linköpings HC; HC Plzeň
- National team: Czech Republic
- NHL draft: Undrafted
- Playing career: 1994–2019

Jaroslav Hlinka (born November 10, 1976, in Prague, Czechoslovakia) is a Czech former professional ice hockey forward who played in the National Hockey League for the Colorado Avalanche. He is currently the Sports manager for his longtime club, HC Sparta Praha of the Czech Extraliga.

== Playing career ==
Hlinka began playing ice hockey at the age of four. When he was fourteen, HC Sparta Praha of the Czech Extraliga offered him a chance on their junior team and he accepted.

From 1994 to 2007, Hlinka mostly played for HC Sparta Praha in the Extraliga, scoring 110 goals and winning the Czech Championship four times (2000, 2002, 2006 and 2007). From 2002 to 2006 he played for three seasons with Kloten Flyers in the Swiss Nationalliga A and one season with Ak Bars Kazan in the now defunct Russian Super League.

On June 1, 2007, Hlinka signed a one-year contract with the Colorado Avalanche in the NHL. He made his NHL debut with the Avalanche on October 3, 2007, during the season opener, scoring his first NHL points as part of a 2-assist game against the Dallas Stars. He scored his first NHL goal on October 23, 2007, against the Edmonton Oilers. After a bright start Hlinka's opportunities with the Avalanche diminished as the season wore on, however, he finished the 2007–08 season with a modest 28 points in 63 games.

In May 2008 he signed a two-year contract with Linköpings HC in the Swedish Elitserien. In 2008–09, his first season with Linköpings, Jaroslav led the team in scoring with 55 points finishing with the most assists in the Elitserien. After starting the 2009–10 season on loan to hometown club Sparta Praha, Hlinka returned to Linköpings to score 50 points in 41 games before losing to Djurgårdens IF in the playoff semi-finals.

On August 8, 2012, Hlinka again returned to the Czech Extraliga to begin the season for a fourth consecutive year, added with the option of potentially remaining with HC Sparta Praha for the duration of the 2012–13 season.

Following the 2018–19 season, Hlinka ended his 25 year professional career, finishing as HC Sparta Praha's All-time leading scorer. He immediately was announced to remain in the organization as the club's sporting manager.

== International play ==
Medal record

Representing Czech Republic

Ice hockey

World Championships
Gold medal – first place	2001 Nuremberg	
Silver medal – second place	2006 Riga	

Hlinka played his first game in the national squad in 1999, and has played 114 times for the national team Hlinka has represented the Czech Republic seven times in the World Championships. He won a Gold medal at the Ice Hockey World Championship in 2001, along with a Silver medal at the Ice Hockey World Championship in 2006.

== Career statistics ==
=== Regular season and playoffs ===
			Regular season					Playoffs
Season	Team	League	GP	G	A	Pts	PIM	GP	G	A	Pts	PIM
1994–95	HC Sparta Praha	CZE	5	0	2	2	2	—	—	—	—	—
1995–96	HC Sparta Praha	CZE	18	3	1	4	4	11	1	4	5	0
1996–97	HC Sparta Praha	CZE	44	8	18	26	12	7	0	0	0	0
1997–98	HC Sparta Praha	CZE	50	18	18	36	24	11	2	6	8	8
1998–99	HC Sparta Praha	CZE	40	9	24	33	22	6	1	2	3	0
1999–00	HC Sparta Praha	CZE	49	20	37	57	51	8	2	3	5	10
2000–01	HC Sparta Praha	CZE	45	12	17	29	28	13	2	9	11	12
2001–02	HC Sparta Praha	CZE	52	16	45	61	54	13	9	6	15	4
2002–03	Kloten Flyers	NLA	41	18	30	48	16	—	—	—	—	—
2003–04	Kloten Flyers	NLA	43	18	24	42	33	—	—	—	—	—
2004–05	Ak Bars Kazan	RSL	36	4	16	20	10	1	0	0	0	0
2005–06	Kloten Flyers	NLA	37	12	24	36	18	—	—	—	—	—
2005–06	HC Sparta Praha	CZE	9	3	8	11	14	17	10	6	16	10
2006–07	HC Sparta Praha	CZE	46	19	38	57	46	16	4	12	16	38
2007–08	Colorado Avalanche	NHL	63	8	20	28	16	1	0	0	0	0
2008–09	Linköpings HC	SEL	54	12	43	55	16	7	1	2	3	6
2009–10	HC Sparta Praha	CZE	20	5	10	15	16	—	—	—	—	—
2009–10	Linköpings HC	SEL	41	13	37	50	12	12	4	4	8	2
2010–11	HC Sparta Praha	CZE	9	1	4	5	2	—	—	—	—	—
2010–11	Linköpings HC	SEL	43	11	29	40	12	7	1	4	5	0
2011–12	HC Plzeň	CZE	13	4	4	8	6	—	—	—	—	—
2011–12	Linköpings HC	SEL	42	5	17	22	6	—	—	—	—	—
2012–13	HC Sparta Praha	CZE	52	15	36	51	22	7	0	2	2	0
2013–14	HC Sparta Praha	CZE	50	17	45	62	36	12	4	7	11	8
2014–15	HC Sparta Praha	CZE	48	17	33	50	32	10	5	6	11	6
2015–16	HC Sparta Praha	CZE	37	14	22	36	10	17	10	7	17	14
2016–17	HC Sparta Praha	CZE	44	11	25	36	24	4	1	2	3	0
2017–18	HC Sparta Praha	CZE	41	2	15	17	6	3	0	1	1	2
2018–19	HC Vrchlabí	Czech.2	8	1	6	7	0	—	—	—	—	—
2018–19	HC Sparta Praha	CZE	5	2	1	3	0	4	0	0	0	2
CZE totals			677	196	402	598	409	164	52	74	126	116
NLA totals			121	48	78	126	67	—	—	—	—	—
RSL totals			36	4	16	20	10	1	0	0	0	0
NHL totals			63	8	20	28	16	1	0	0	0	0
SHL totals			180	41	126	167	46	26	6	10	16	8

=== International ===
Year	Team	Event	Result	GP	G	A	Pts	PIM
2001	Czech Republic	WC	1st place, gold medalist(s)	9	0	1	1	2
2002	Czech Republic	WC	5th	7	1	5	6	2
2003	Czech Republic	WC	4th	9	2	1	3	6
2004	Czech Republic	WC	5th	2	0	1	1	2
2006	Czech Republic	WC	2nd place, silver medalist(s)	9	2	4	6	2
2007	Czech Republic	WC	7th	7	3	4	7	0
2008	Czech Republic	WC	5th	6	1	3	4	2
2009	Czech Republic	WC	6th	7	1	2	3	4
Senior totals				56	10	21	31	20
