= Abdulla Gizatullin =

Soviet soldier

Abdulla Gubaidullovich Gizatullin
- Native name: Абдулла Губайдуллович Гизату́ллин; Абдулла Гобәйдулла улы Гыйззәтуллин
- Born: 5 May 1904; Ibragimovo, Ufa District, Ufa Governorate, Russian Empire
- Died: 15 March 1945 (aged 40) Ustfav, Nazi Germany
- Allegiance: Soviet Union
- Branch: Red Army
- Service years: 1942–1945
- Rank: Sergeant
- Conflicts: World War II
- Awards: Hero of the Soviet Union

Abdulla Gubaidullovich Gizatullin (Tatar: Абдулла Гобәйдулла улы Гыйззәтуллин, Russian: Абдулла Губайдуллович Гизату́ллин; 5 May 1904 – 15 March 1945) was a Soviet soldier and Hero of the Soviet Union.

== Biography ==
Abdulla Gubaidullovich Gizatullin was born on 5 May 1904 in the village Ibragimovo. Tatar by nationality. Received primary education. Member of the VKP(b) since 1938. Before the Great Patriotic War, he worked as a foreman of a tractor brigade at the sovkhoz «Urshak» in the Chishminsky District.

He was drafted into the Red Army in May 1942 by the Chishminsky District Military Commissariat. Participated in the Great Patriotic War from December 1942.

The squad leader of the 60th Guards Cavalry Regiment, 16th Guards Cavalry Division, 7th Guards Cavalry Corps, 61st Army, Central Front. Gizatullin in battles with the German invaders showed exceptional intrepidity and courage.

20 September 1943 in the battle for the village Lopatino (Gomel Region). Gizatullin repulsed a counterattack of two enemy tanks and infantry, and in the subsequent offensive with his squad suppressed the enemy's machine-gun point, which hindered the advance of soviet units.

On 28 September 1943, during the crossing of the Dnieper, under artillery and machine-gun fire, Gizatullin was the first from the squadron to cross to the western bank of the Dnieper River. In a fierce battle to hold the bridgehead near the village Galki (Bragin district, Gomel region) he personally destroyed 2 machine guns and thereby allowing the rest of the regiment to successfully cross the river. After being seriously wounded, he did not leave the battlefield. According to the decree of the Presidium of the Supreme Soviet of the USSR of 15 January 1944, for the exemplary performance of the combat missions of the command and for the courage and heroism shown in battles with the Nazi invaders, the guard sergeant Gizatullin Abdulla Gubaidullovich was awarded the title of Hero of the Soviet Union.

Gizatullin, after being cured in the hospital, went to the front, but did not return to his unit, and became the commander of a gun crew in an anti-tank destroyer artillery regiment.

He died on 15 March 1945, without ever knowing that he was a Hero of the Soviet Union. Buried in the city of Ustfaw (Germany). Nothing is known about the safety and location of Gizatullin's grave.

== Recognition ==
In Bashkiria, the memory of Gizatullin is honored.

- In the village of Chishmy, a street is named after him.
- The name of A. Gizatullin is carved in gold letters on memorial plaques, along with the names of all 78 heroes of the Soviet Union of the 112th Bashkir (16th Guards Chernigov) Cavalry Division, installed in the National Museum of the Republic of Bashkortostan and in the museum of the 112th Bashkir Cavalry Division.
- In his native village, the school bears the name of the hero (Municipal budgetary educational institution Secondary school named after Abdulla Gizatullin, Ibragimovo village, Chishminsky district of the Republic of Bashkortostan).

== Sources ==
- Герои Советского Союза: Краткий биографический словарь / Пред. ред. коллегии И. Н. Шкадов. — М.: Воениздат, 1987. — Т. 1 /Абаев — Любичев/. — 911 с. — 100 000 экз. — ISBN отс., Рег. No. в РКП 87–95382
