= Petr Čáslava =

Czech ice hockey player

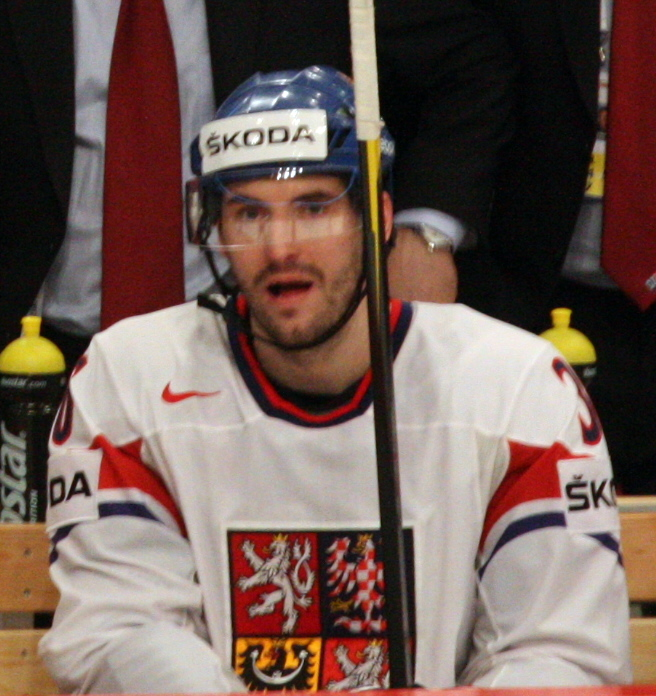
- Born: September 3, 1979 (age 46) Kolín, Czechoslovakia
- Height: 6 ft 4 in (193 cm)
- Weight: 220 lb (100 kg; 15 st 10 lb)
- Position: Defence
- Shoots: Left
- ELH team Former teams: HC Pardubice; Severstal Cherepovets; HC CSKA Moscow
- National team: Czech Republic
- Playing career: 1998–present

Petr Čáslava (born 3 September 1979) is a Czech professional ice hockey defenceman currently playing for HC Pardubice of the Czech Extraliga.

== Playing career ==
Čáslava spent the majority of his career with HC Pardubice of the Czech Extraliga. He also played in Russia for Severstal Cherepovets for the 2007-08 Russian Superleague season before returning to Pardubice and in Sweden for Timrå IK for the 2009-10 Elitserien season before moving back to Russia for CSKA Moscow.

== International play ==
Medal record

Men's ice hockey

Representing Czech Republic

World Championships
Gold medal – first place	2010 Cologne	Team
Bronze medal – third place	2011 Bratislava	Team
Bronze medal – third place	2012 Helsinki	Team

Čáslava has played for the Czech Republic national ice hockey team. He played his first game in the national squad in 2002, and has played 53 times for the national team (as of Jan 3 2009), and played in the 2007 World Championship and 2008 World Championship.
