= Oleg Antonenko =

Belarusian ice hockey player (born 1971)

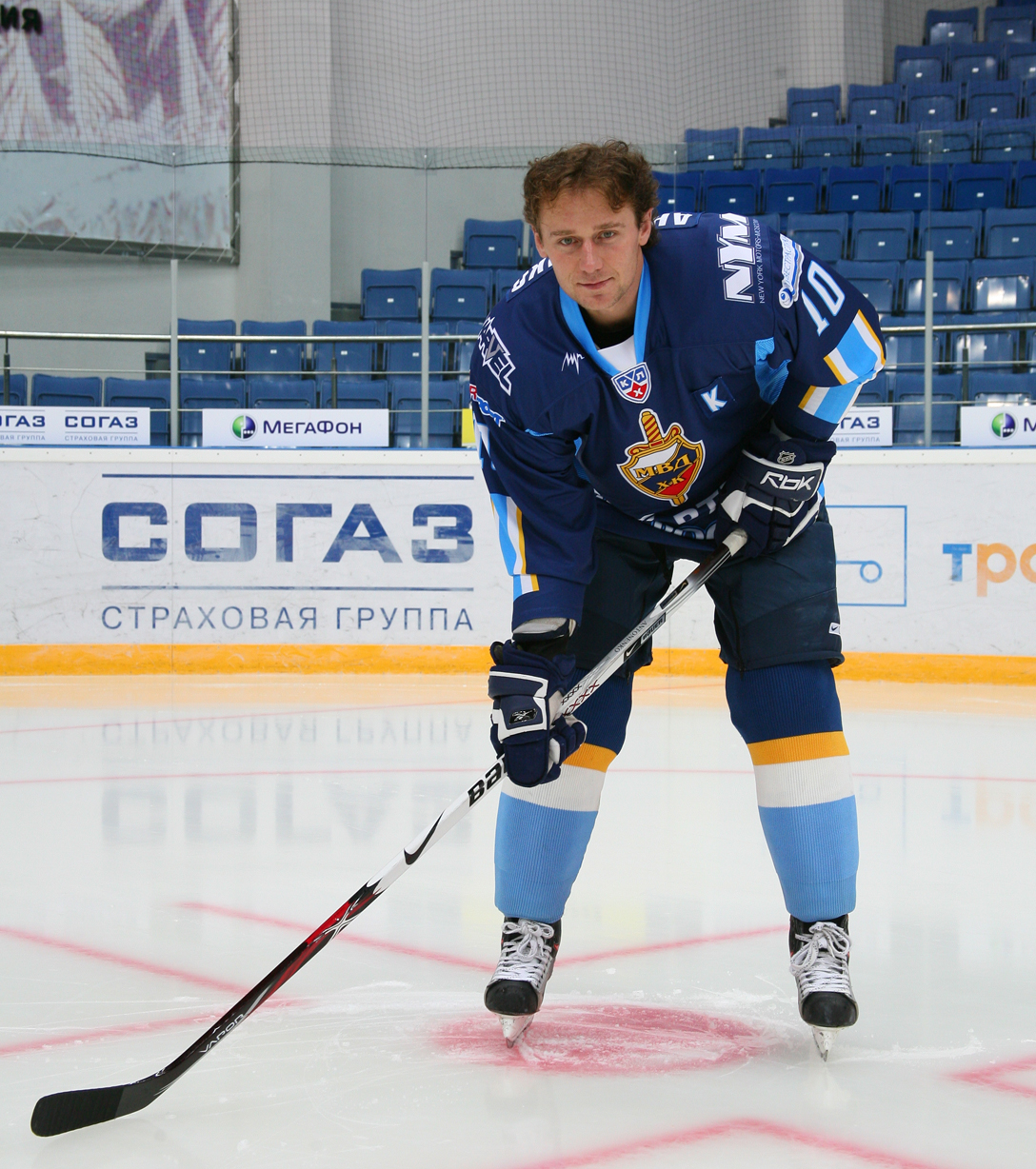
- Born: July 1, 1971 (age 53); Minsk, Byelorussian SSR, Soviet Union
- Height: 6 ft 2 in (188 cm)
- Weight: 203 lb (92 kg; 14 st 7 lb)
- Position: Right Wing
- Shot: Right
- VHL team Former teams: Molot-Prikamye Perm; HC Dynamo Minsk; Tivali Minsk; HC Severstal; HC Nizhnekamsk Neftekhimik; Ak Bars Kazan; HC Vsetin; Torpedo Nizhny Novgorod; Metallurg Novokuznetsk; HC MVD; Avtomobilist Yekaterinburg
- National team: Belarus
- Playing career: 1988–2011

Oleg Vladimirovich Antonenko (Russian: Олег Владимирович Антоненко) (born 1 July 1971 in Minsk, Byelorussian SSR, Soviet Union) is a Belarusian professional former ice hockey left wing.

Antonenko began playing professional in 1988 with Dynamo Minsk of the Soviet League. He has also played for Severstal, Nizhnekamsk Neftekhimik, Ak Bars Kazan, Vsetin, Torpedo Nizhny Novgorod, Metallurg Novokuznetsk, HC MVD, and Yekaterinburg Automobilist.

Antonenko was selected for the Belarus national men's ice hockey team in the 2002 Winter Olympics and the 2010 Winter Olympics.

Assistant head coach of Belarusian national ice hockey team from 2014.

== Career statistics ==
=== Regular season and playoffs ===
			Regular season					Playoffs
Season	Team	League	GP	G	A	Pts	PIM	GP	G	A	Pts	PIM
1988–89	Dinamo Minsk	USSR	2	0	0	0	0	—	—	—	—	—
1988–89	Neman Grodno	USSR.3	28	6	1	7	6	—	—	—	—	—
1989–90	Dinamo Minsk	USSR	20	1	0	1	6	—	—	—	—	—
1989–90	Progress Grodno	USSR.2	2	2	0	2	0	—	—	—	—	—
1990–91	Dinamo Minsk	USSR	27	5	0	5	18	—	—	—	—	—
1991–92	Dinamo Minsk	CIS	18	5	2	7	6	—	—	—	—	—
1992–93	Dinamo Minsk	IHL	33	4	2	6	38	—	—	—	—	—
1992–93	Tivali Minsk	BLR	2	1	0	1	4	—	—	—	—	—
1993–94	Tivali Minsk	IHL	41	14	3	17	24	—	—	—	—	—
1993–94	Tivali Minsk	BLR	16	6	3	9	12	—	—	—	—	—
1994–95	Tivali Minsk	IHL	46	11	7	18	30	—	—	—	—	—
1994–95	Tivali Minsk	BLR	10	12	6	18	0	—	—	—	—	—
1995–96	Severstal Cherepovets	IHL	47	2	3	5	18	—	—	—	—	—
1996–97	Neftekhimik Nizhnekamsk	RSL	40	11	5	16	24	2	0	0	0	0
1997–98	Neftekhimik Nizhnekamsk	RSL	27	14	8	22	14	—	—	—	—	—
1997–98	Ak Bars Kazan	RSL	9	7	4	11	4	—	—	—	—	—
1998–99	Ak Bars Kazan	RSL	37	7	4	11	26	13	1	2	3	27
1999–2000	Neftekhimik Nizhnekamsk	RSL	6	1	1	2	2	—	—	—	—	—
1999–2000	HC Slovnaft Vsetín	ELH	16	1	4	5	10	4	0	0	0	0
2000–01	Torpedo Nizhny Novgorod	RSL	43	10	16	26	42	—	—	—	—	—
2001–02	Severstal Cherepovets	RSL	43	13	19	32	12	4	1	2	3	2
2002–03	Severstal Cherepovets	RSL	2	1	0	1	0	—	—	—	—	—
2002–03	Metallurg Novokuznetsk	RSL	30	8	11	19	14	—	—	—	—	—
2003–04	Severstal Cherepovets	RSL	45	7	15	22	22	—	—	—	—	—
2003–04	Severstal–2 Cherepovets	RUS.3	5	1	4	5	2	—	—	—	—	—
2003–04	HK Gomel	BLR	—	—	—	—	—	5	1	1	2	6
2004–05	HC MVD	RUS.2	45	22	15	37	16	13	7	8	15	2
2005–06	HC MVD	RSL	28	11	5	16	18	—	—	—	—	—
2005–06	Dinamo Minsk	BLR	—	—	—	—	—	10	7	4	11	2
2006–07	Dinamo Minsk	BLR	48	31	23	54	22	12	6	5	11	4
2007–08	HC MVD	RSL	44	17	14	31	20	—	—	—	—	—
2007–08	HC MVD–2	RUS.3	2	1	1	2	2	—	—	—	—	—
2008–09	HC MVD	KHL	49	18	11	29	14	—	—	—	—	—
2009–10	Avtomobilist Yekaterinburg	KHL	13	4	3	7	2	—	—	—	—	—
2009–10	Dinamo Minsk	KHL	24	9	5	14	10	—	—	—	—	—
2010–11	Molot–Prikamye Perm	RUS.2	4	0	0	0	0	—	—	—	—	—
2010–11	HK Gomel	BLR	44	15	16	31	16	5	4	4	8	14
USSR/CIS totals			67	11	2	13	30	—	—	—	—	—
IHL totals			167	31	15	46	110	—	—	—	—	—
RSL totals			354	107	102	209	198	19	2	4	6	29

=== International ===
Year	Team	Event	GP	G	A	Pts	PIM
1994	Belarus	WC C	6	1	3	4	4
1997	Belarus	WC B	7	3	5	8	6
1998	Belarus	WC	6	0	0	0	4
1999	Belarus	WC	6	2	1	3	4
2001	Belarus	OGQ	3	2	1	3	4
2001	Belarus	WC	6	2	1	3	4
2002	Belarus	OG	9	1	1	2	8
2002	Belarus	WC D1	5	1	2	3	0
2005	Belarus	OGQ	3	2	4	6	25
2006	Belarus	WC	7	3	1	4	2
2007	Belarus	WC	6	5	3	8	0
2008	Belarus	WC	2	0	0	0	2
2009	Belarus	WC	7	3	3	6	2
2010	Belarus	OG	4	0	0	0	0
Senior totals			77	25	25	50	65
