= Ibragimovo, Chishminsky District, Republic of Bashkortostan =

Ibragimovo Ибрагимово
- Selo
- Location within Bashkortostan Location within Russia
- Coordinates: 54°23′N 55°35′E
- Country: Russia
- Region: Bashkortostan
- District: Chishminsky District
- Time zone: UTC+5:00

Ibragimovo (Russian: Ибрагимово; Bashkir: Ибраһим, İbrahim) is a rural locality (a selo) and the administrative centre of Ibragimovsky Selsoviet, Chishminsky District, Bashkortostan, Russia. The population was 344 as of 2010. There are 6 streets.

== Geography ==
Ibragimovo is located 32 km southeast of Chishmy, the district's administrative seat. Bikeyevo is the nearest rural locality.
