= Pekka Saravo =

Finnish ice hockey player

- Born: 13 November 1979 (age 46) Rovaniemi, Finland
- Height: 6 ft 2 in (188 cm)
- Weight: 200 lb (91 kg; 14 st 4 lb)
- Position: Defender
- Shot: Left
- Played for: Tappara; Diskos; Linköpings HC; Luleå HF
- NHL draft: undrafted
- Playing career: 1998–2017

Medal record

Men's ice hockey

Representing Finland

World Championships
| Silver medal – second place | 2007 Russia | Ice hockey |
| Bronze medal – third place | 2006 Latvia | Ice hockey |

Pekka Saravo (born 13 November 1979) is a Finnish former professional ice hockey defender. He played for the Tappara of the SM-liiga between 2000-2006 and 2009-2017.

== Playing career ==
Saravo played five full seasons for Tappara in 2000-2006 before moving to Luleå HF in Sweden. After three years there he played one season with another Elitserien team, Linköpings HC. In 2009 he returned to Tappara, signing a six-year contract with the club. Saravo has also played for the Finland men's national ice hockey team. After the 2016-2017 season, Saravo ended his player career.

== Career statistics ==
| | | | Regular season | | | | | Playoffs |
| Season | Team | League | GP | G | A | Pts | PIM | GP | G | A | Pts | PIM |
|---|---|---|---|---|---|---|---|---|---|---|---|---|
| 1994–95 | Tappara U16 | U16 SM-sarja | 31 | 3 | 1 | 4 | 4 | 5 | 0 | 0 | 0 | 2 |
| 1995–96 | Tappara U18 | U18 SM-sarja | 29 | 0 | 1 | 1 | 26 | 6 | 0 | 1 | 1 | 2 |
| 1996–97 | Tappara U18 | U18 SM-sarja | 27 | 6 | 6 | 12 | 45 | — | — | — | — | — |
| 1996–97 | Tappara U20 | U20 I-Divisioona | 4 | 0 | 0 | 0 | 0 | — | — | — | — | — |
| 1997–98 | Tappara U20 | U20 SM-liiga | 36 | 7 | 7 | 14 | 24 | 6 | 0 | 0 | 0 | 2 |
| 1998–99 | Diskos U20 | U20 II-Divisioona | — | — | — | — | — | — | — | — | — | — |
| 1998–99 | Diskos | I-Divisioona | 48 | 5 | 7 | 12 | 34 | 4 | 0 | 0 | 0 | 0 |
| 1999–00 | Tappara U20 | U20 SM-liiga | 38 | 9 | 11 | 20 | 52 | 8 | 1 | 4 | 5 | 4 |
| 2000–01 | Tappara | SM-liiga | 56 | 1 | 3 | 4 | 38 | 10 | 0 | 2 | 2 | 4 |
| 2001–02 | Tappara | SM-liiga | 53 | 3 | 1 | 4 | 12 | 10 | 0 | 0 | 0 | 6 |
| 2002–03 | Tappara | SM-liiga | 55 | 4 | 4 | 8 | 42 | 15 | 1 | 2 | 3 | 8 |
| 2003–04 | Tappara | SM-liiga | 47 | 7 | 8 | 15 | 30 | 3 | 0 | 0 | 0 | 2 |
| 2004–05 | Tappara | SM-liiga | 56 | 6 | 11 | 17 | 30 | 8 | 1 | 0 | 1 | 2 |
| 2005–06 | Luleå HF | Elitserien | 44 | 8 | 9 | 17 | 52 | 6 | 1 | 0 | 1 | 6 |
| 2006–07 | Luleå HF | Elitserien | 55 | 6 | 17 | 23 | 62 | 4 | 0 | 0 | 0 | 4 |
| 2007–08 | Luleå HF | Elitserien | 55 | 8 | 10 | 18 | 52 | — | — | — | — | — |
| 2008–09 | Linköping HC | Elitserien | 54 | 4 | 4 | 8 | 50 | 6 | 0 | 2 | 2 | 4 |
| 2009–10 | Tappara | SM-liiga | 52 | 7 | 12 | 19 | 46 | 9 | 0 | 1 | 1 | 8 |
| 2010–11 | Tappara | SM-liiga | 48 | 7 | 12 | 19 | 36 | — | — | — | — | — |
| 2011–12 | Tappara | SM-liiga | 48 | 4 | 4 | 8 | 32 | — | — | — | — | — |
| 2012–13 | Tappara | SM-liiga | 56 | 1 | 7 | 8 | 26 | 15 | 0 | 1 | 1 | 10 |
| 2013–14 | Tappara | Liiga | 56 | 4 | 4 | 8 | 36 | 20 | 0 | 2 | 2 | 2 |
| 2014–15 | Tappara | Liiga | 59 | 2 | 2 | 4 | 30 | 20 | 0 | 0 | 0 | 27 |
| 2015–16 | Tappara | Liiga | 60 | 3 | 7 | 10 | 32 | 15 | 0 | 0 | 0 | 8 |
| 2016–17 | Tappara | Liiga | 56 | 1 | 3 | 4 | 24 | 18 | 0 | 3 | 3 | 2 |
| SM-liiga totals | | | 702 | 50 | 78 | 128 | 414 | 143 | 2 | 11 | 13 | 79 |
| Elitserien totals | | | 208 | 26 | 40 | 66 | 216 | 16 | 1 | 2 | 3 | 14 |

== Honours ==
- Finnish championship with Tappara (2003, 2016, 2017)
- Finnish silver medal with Tappara (2001, 2002, 2013, 2014, 2015)
- Silver medal at the Ice Hockey World Championships (2007)
- Bronze medal at the Ice Hockey World Championships (2006)

| Preceded by Janne Ojanen | Captain of Tappara; 2009–2012 | Succeeded by Tuukka Mäntylä |
