= Peter Podhradský =

Slovak ice hockey player (born 1979)

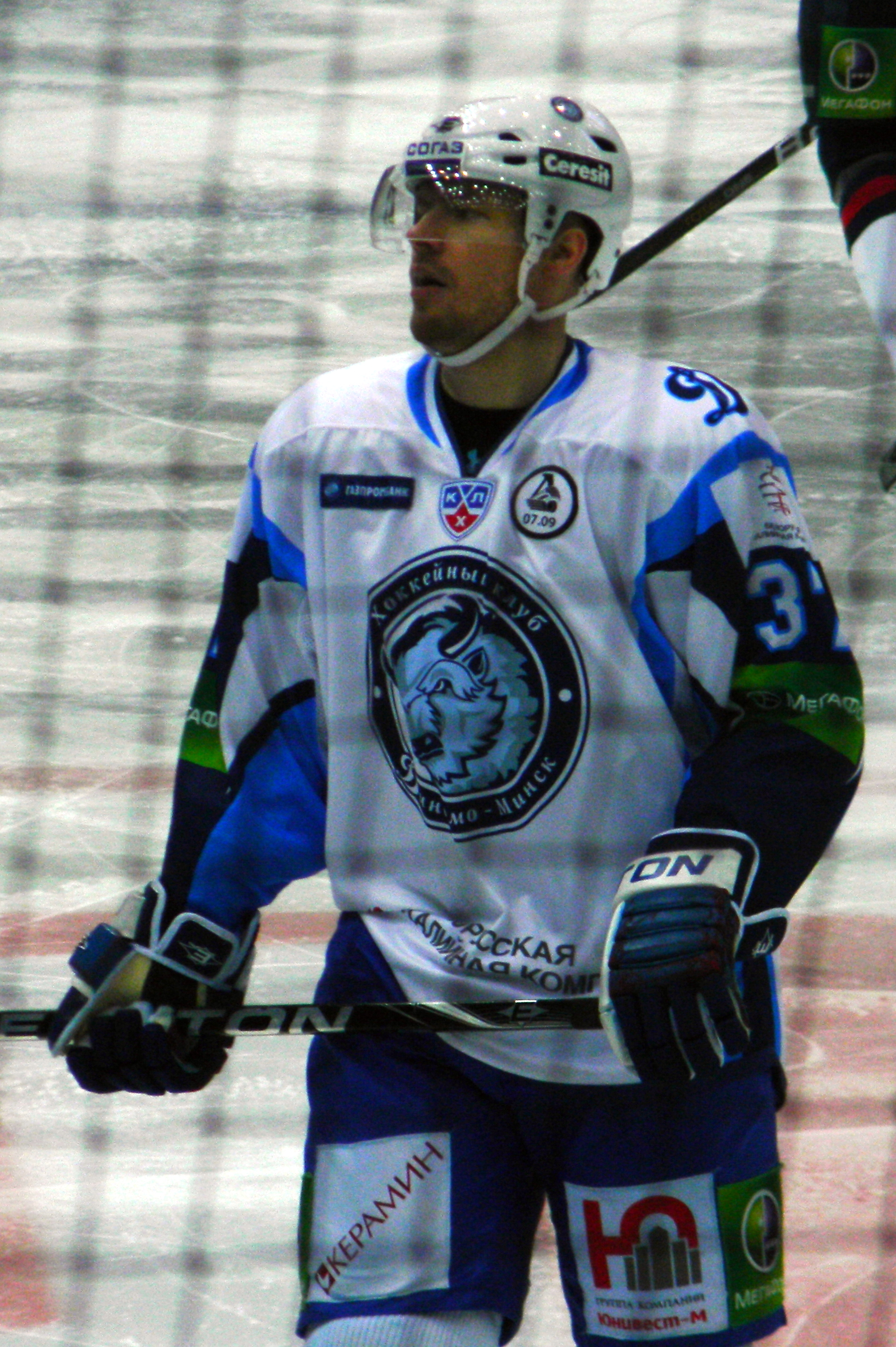
- Born: December 10, 1979 (age 46) Bratislava, Czechoslovakia
- Position: Defence
- Shot: Right
- team Former teams: Free agent HC Dinamo Minsk; Metallurg Novokuznetsk; Torpedo Nizhny Novgorod; Barys Astana; HC Donbass; HC Lada Togliatti
- National team: Slovakia
- NHL draft: 134th overall, 2000; Mighty Ducks of Anaheim
- Playing career: 1999–2018

Peter Podhradský (born December 10, 1979) is a Slovak former professional ice hockey defenceman.

== Playing career ==
Podhradský was drafted 134th overall by the Mighty Ducks of Anaheim in the 2000 NHL entry draft and spent three seasons with their American Hockey League affiliate the Cincinnati Mighty Ducks but never managed to play in the NHL. He went to the Czech Republic and then back to Slovakia before signing for the Frankfurt Lions for the 2006–07 season where he was the team's top scoring defenceman with 17 goals and 19 assists for 36 points in 45 games.

On August 12, 2014, with HC Donbass suspending operations due to civil unrest, Podhradský signed a one-year contract with HC Lada Togliatti for the 2014–15 season.

== Career statistics ==
=== Regular season and playoffs ===
| | | | Regular season | | | | | Playoffs |
| Season | Team | League | GP | G | A | Pts | PIM | GP | G | A | Pts | PIM |
|---|---|---|---|---|---|---|---|---|---|---|---|---|
| 1998–99 | HC Slovan Bratislava | SVK | 27 | 1 | 4 | 5 | 37 | — | — | — | — | — |
| 1998–99 | HK Trnava | SVK.2 | 19 | 0 | 6 | 6 | 8 | — | — | — | — | — |
| 1999–2000 | HC Slovan Bratislava | SVK | 40 | 4 | 11 | 15 | 63 | 8 | 1 | 0 | 1 | 2 |
| 2000–01 | Cincinnati Mighty Ducks | AHL | 59 | 4 | 5 | 9 | 27 | 2 | 0 | 0 | 0 | 0 |
| 2001–02 | Cincinnati Mighty Ducks | AHL | 49 | 0 | 8 | 8 | 19 | — | — | — | — | — |
| 2002–03 | Cincinnati Mighty Ducks | AHL | 78 | 9 | 8 | 17 | 85 | — | — | — | — | — |
| 2003–04 | HC Moeller Pardubice | ELH | 44 | 2 | 2 | 4 | 34 | — | — | — | — | — |
| 2003–04 | Bílí Tygři Liberec | ELH | 7 | 0 | 4 | 4 | 2 | — | — | — | — | — |
| 2004–05 | HC Oceláři Třinec | ELH | 39 | 0 | 5 | 5 | 83 | — | — | — | — | — |
| 2004–05 | MsHK Žilina | SVK | 10 | 1 | 3 | 4 | 6 | 5 | 0 | 1 | 1 | 2 |
| 2005–06 | HC Košice | SVK | 47 | 15 | 24 | 39 | 56 | 8 | 1 | 1 | 2 | 2 |
| 2006–07 | Frankfurt Lions | DEL | 45 | 17 | 19 | 36 | 58 | 8 | 5 | 4 | 9 | 10 |
| 2007–08 | Metallurg Novokuznetsk | RSL | 55 | 6 | 10 | 16 | 38 | — | — | — | — | — |
| 2008–09 | Torpedo Nizhny Novgorod | KHL | 56 | 6 | 32 | 38 | 46 | 3 | 0 | 1 | 1 | 2 |
| 2009–10 | Barys Astana | KHL | 56 | 8 | 19 | 27 | 52 | 3 | 1 | 0 | 1 | 2 |
| 2010–11 | Dinamo Minsk | KHL | 48 | 8 | 22 | 30 | 42 | 7 | 2 | 6 | 8 | 6 |
| 2011–12 | Metallurg Magnitogorsk | KHL | 2 | 0 | 0 | 0 | 2 | — | — | — | — | — |
| 2011–12 | Dinamo Minsk | KHL | 42 | 9 | 17 | 26 | 34 | 4 | 1 | 1 | 2 | 12 |
| 2012–13 | Donbass Donetsk | KHL | 52 | 10 | 11 | 21 | 48 | — | — | — | — | — |
| 2013–14 | Donbass Donetsk | KHL | 53 | 5 | 16 | 21 | 62 | 13 | 0 | 1 | 1 | 2 |
| 2014–15 | Lada Togliatti | KHL | 42 | 4 | 11 | 15 | 22 | — | — | — | — | — |
| 2015–16 | HK Nitra | SVK | 50 | 3 | 11 | 14 | 34 | 17 | 1 | 5 | 6 | 6 |
| 2017–18 | HC OSMOS Bratislava | SVK.2 | 8 | 3 | 4 | 7 | 2 | — | — | — | — | — |
| SVK totals | | | 174 | 24 | 53 | 77 | 196 | 38 | 3 | 7 | 10 | 12 |
| AHL totals | | | 186 | 13 | 21 | 34 | 131 | 2 | 0 | 0 | 0 | 0 |
| KHL totals | | | 351 | 50 | 128 | 178 | 308 | 30 | 4 | 9 | 13 | 24 |

=== International ===
| Year | Team | Event | GP | G | A | Pts | PIM |
|---|---|---|---|---|---|---|---|
| 1999 | Slovakia | WJC | 6 | 0 | 2 | 2 | 4 |
| 2000 | Slovakia | WC | 9 | 0 | 1 | 1 | 14 |
| 2007 | Slovakia | WC | 7 | 2 | 5 | 7 | 6 |
| 2008 | Slovakia | WC | 3 | 1 | 0 | 1 | 0 |
| 2011 | Slovakia | WC | 6 | 0 | 1 | 1 | 0 |
| Senior totals | | | 25 | 3 | 7 | 10 | 20 |
