= Alexei Vorontsov =

Kazakhstani ice hockey player

- Born: January 18, 1986 (age 40) Ust-Kamenogorsk, Kazakhstan
- Height: 6 ft 0 in (183 cm)
- Weight: 194 lb (88 kg; 13 st 12 lb)
- Position: Left wing
- Shoots: Left
- KHL team (P) Cur. team: Barys Astana; Nomad Astana (KAZ)
- National team: Kazakhstan
- NHL draft: Undrafted
- Playing career: 2009–present

Alexei Vorontsov (born January 18, 1986) is a Kazakhstani professional ice hockey forward who currently plays for Barys Astana of the Kontinental Hockey League (KHL). He participated at the 2010 IIHF World Championship as a member of the Kazakhstan men's national ice hockey team.
