= Ildar Nugumanov =

Russian futsal player

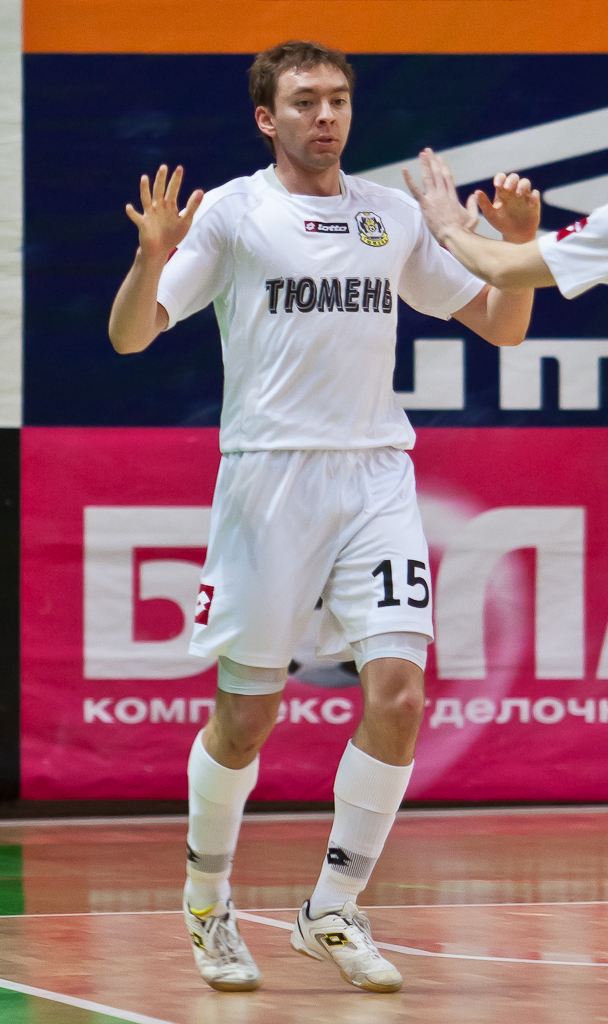

Personal information
- Date of birth: 5 May 1988 (age 38)
- Place of birth: Soviet Union
- Height: 1.84 m (6 ft 0 in)
- Position: Ala

Team information
- Current team: Tyumen

Senior career*
Years	Team	Apps	(Gls)
2005–	Tyumen		

International career
–	Russia		
- * Club domestic league appearances and goals

Ildar Nugumanov (born 5 May 1988) is a Russian futsal player who plays for Tyumen and the Russian national futsal team.
