= Ezatullah Zawab =

Afghan journalist

- Born: Izzat Allāh Żwāb; Jalalabad, Nangarhar Province, Afghanistan
- Occupation: Journalist

Ezatullah Zawab (or ʻIzzat Allāh Żwāb) is a journalist from Jalalabad, Nangarhar Province, Afghanistan.

In 2003 Ezatullah Zawab was selected by the Institute for War and Peace Reporting as a candidate for journalism training.

On September 2, 2005 Ezatullah Zawab was apprehended by local officials. The Committee to Protect Journalists (CPJ) said: "Zawab is a staff correspondent for the independent news service Pajhwok Afghan News and editor of the monthly Meena magazine."

CPJ said his apprehension was triggered by article he had published which were regarded as critical of local clerics and local officials.

Ann Cooper, CPJ's Executive Director, wrote:

"We demand the immediate and unconditional release of Ezatullah Zawab. This is a blow to press freedom and sends the wrong message to other reporters in Afghanistan and to the international community."

Ezatullah Zawab was found beaten and unconscious in a ditch a week after his capture. He reported: "...that unidentified gunmen from Jalalabad picked him up and held him blindfolded in a basement. He was threatened and interrogated before being released."
