= Sergei Gimayev (ice hockey, born 1984) =

Russian ice hockey player

- Born: February 16, 1984 (age 42) Moscow, Russian SFSR, Soviet Union
- Height: 6 ft 2 in (188 cm)
- Weight: 190 lb (86 kg; 13 st 8 lb)
- Position: Defence
- Shot: Left
- Played for: Severstal Cherepovets; HC Sibir Novosibirsk; Dynamo Moscow; Barys Astana; Salavat Yulaev Ufa; CSKA Moscow; HC Vityaz; Dinamo Riga; Kunlun Red Star
- NHL draft: 166th overall, 2003; Ottawa Senators
- Playing career: 1999–2021

Sergei Gimayev (born 16 February 1984) is a Russian former professional ice hockey player who played in the Kontinental Hockey League (KHL). He was selected by Ottawa Senators in the 5th round (166th overall) of the 2003 NHL Entry Draft.

Gimayev made his Kontinental Hockey League debut playing with Barys Astana during the inaugural 2008–09 KHL season.

After making eight appearances with HC Kunlun Red Star during the 2020–21 season, Gimayev announced his immediate retirement after 20 professional seasons on 25 January 2021.

== Career statistics ==
=== Regular season and playoffs ===
			Regular season					Playoffs
Season	Team	League	GP	G	A	Pts	PIM	GP	G	A	Pts	PIM
1999–2000	CSKA–2 Moscow	RUS.3	3	0	0	0	0	—	—	—	—	—
2000–01	CSKA–2 Moscow	RUS.3	38	0	2	2	68	—	—	—	—	—
2001–02	CSKA–2 Moscow	RUS.3	38	1	10	11	50	—	—	—	—	—
2002–03	Severstal Cherepovets	RSL	11	0	0	0	4	—	—	—	—	—
2002–03	Severstal–2 Cherepovets	RUS.3	22	2	4	6	24	—	—	—	—	—
2003–04	Severstal Cherepovets	RSL	50	1	3	4	32	—	—	—	—	—
2003–04	Severstal–2 Cherepovets	RUS.3	3	1	1	2	4	—	—	—	—	—
2004–05	Severstal Cherepovets	RSL	5	0	1	1	2	—	—	—	—	—
2004–05	Severstal–2 Cherepovets	RUS.3	8	0	2	2	8	—	—	—	—	—
2004–05	Sibir Novosibirsk	RSL	31	1	6	7	34	—	—	—	—	—
2005–06	Dynamo Moscow	RSL	46	1	3	4	36	2	0	0	0	0
2006–07	Dynamo Moscow	RSL	23	0	2	2	28	2	0	0	0	6
2006–07	Dynamo–2 Moscow	RUS.3	2	0	0	0	6	—	—	—	—	—
2007–08	Severstal Cherepovets	RSL	39	1	0	1	30	8	1	1	2	4
2008–09	Barys Astana	KHL	45	0	2	2	79	—	—	—	—	—
2009–10	Barys Astana	KHL	54	6	6	12	73	3	0	1	1	8
2010–11	Barys Astana	KHL	52	5	3	8	44	4	0	0	0	4
2011–12	Salavat Yulaev Ufa	KHL	43	1	4	5	27	3	0	0	0	0
2012–13	CSKA Moscow	KHL	43	1	0	1	22	2	0	0	0	2
2013–14	CSKA Moscow	KHL	33	0	3	3	12	4	0	0	0	2
2014–15	Sibir Novosibirsk	KHL	53	0	4	4	55	16	0	3	3	6
2015–16	Sibir Novosibirsk	KHL	58	0	12	12	47	10	1	0	1	22
2016–17	HC Vityaz	KHL	57	0	4	4	36	3	0	0	0	0
2017–18	HC Vityaz	KHL	25	0	1	1	21	—	—	—	—	—
2018–19	Dinamo Rīga	KHL	54	0	1	1	34	—	—	—	—	—
2019–20	Dinamo Rīga	KHL	30	1	0	1	15	—	—	—	—	—
2020–21	Kunlun Red Star	KHL	8	0	1	1	4	—	—	—	—	—
RSL totals			205	4	15	19	166	12	1	1	2	10
KHL totals			555	14	41	55	469	45	1	4	5	44

=== International ===
Year	Team	Event	GP	G	A	Pts	PIM
2004	Russia	WJC	6	0	2	2	6
Junior totals			6	0	2	2	6
