= Dildar =

Dildar is a masculine given name. It may refer to:

- Dildar (actor) (1945–2003), Bangladeshi film actor
- Dildar (poet) (1918–1948), Kurdish poet and political activist

== Given name ==
- Dildar Ali Naseerabadi (1753–1820), Shia scholar of India
- Dildar Hussain (born 1957), Pakistani Tabla player
- Dildar Pervaiz Bhatti (1940–1994), Pakistani TV host
- Dildar Awan (1928–2000), Pakistani cricketer
- Dildar Ahmed, Pakistani heavyweight boxer

== See also ==
- Dildarnagar, a town and a nagar panchayat in the Ghazipur district of Uttar Pradesh, India
- Meray Qatil Meray Dildar, a 2011 Hum TV teledrama
