= Michael Hackert =

German ice hockey player

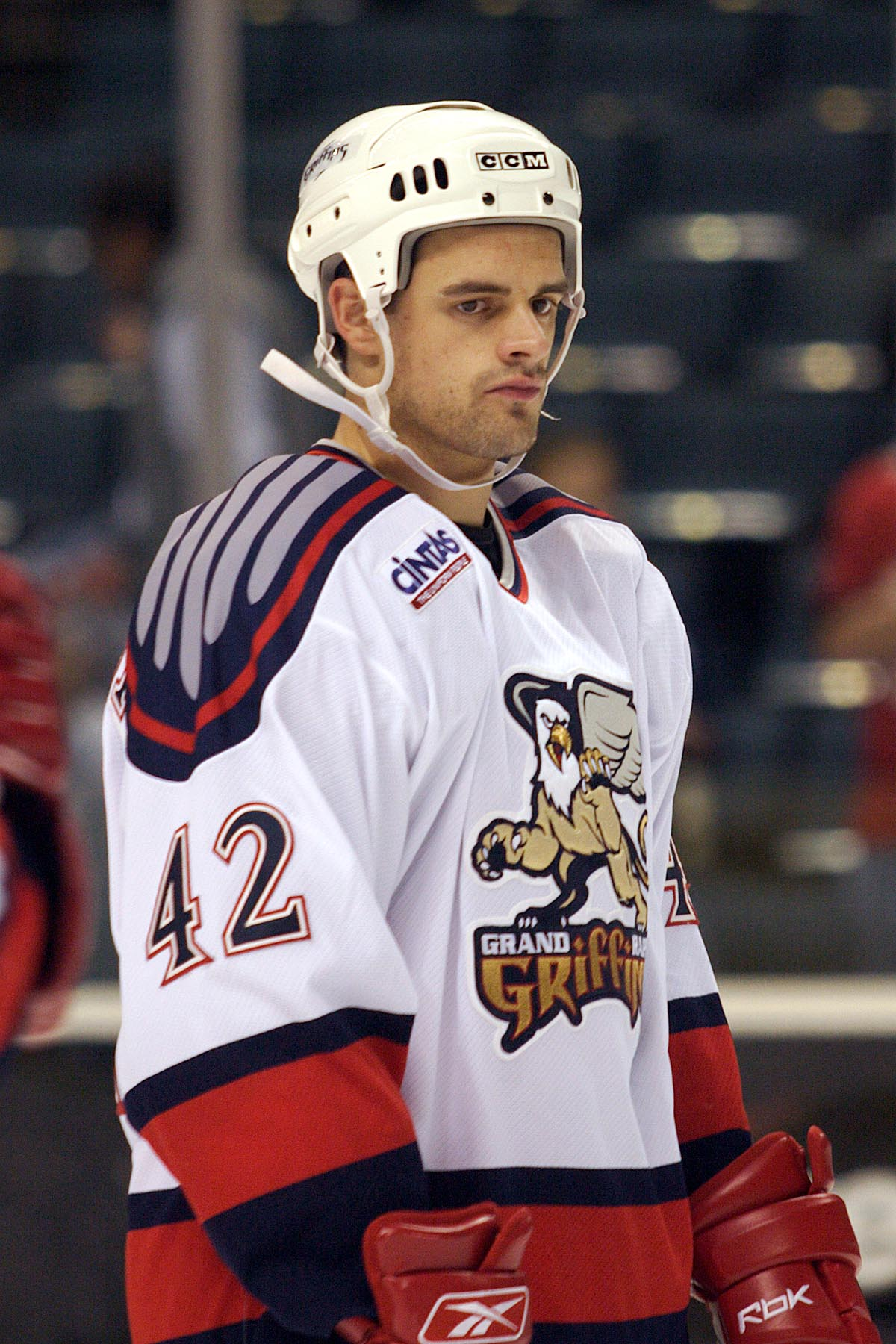
- Hackert with the Grand Rapids Griffins in 2005
- Born: 21 June 1981 (age 44) Heilbronn, West Germany
- Height: 6 ft 0 in (183 cm)
- Weight: 200 lb (91 kg; 14 st 4 lb)
- Position: Centre
- Shot: Left
- DEL team: Iserlohn Roosters
- Played for: DEG Metro Stars; ERC Ingolstadt; Frankfurt Lions; Grand Rapids Griffins; Adler Mannheim; Iserlohn Roosters; Heilbronner Falken
- National team: Germany
- Playing career: 1998–2014

Michael Hackert (German: [ˈmɪçaʔeːl ˈhakɐt]; born 21 June 1981) is a professional German ice hockey centre who last played for Heilbronner Falken of the DEL2. Hackert also played for Iserlohn Roosters of the German Deutsche Eishockey Liga (DEL), as well as for the Grand Rapids Griffins of the American Hockey League. In addition, Hackert has been a member of the German national team in several international competitions.

== Career statistics ==
=== Regular season and playoffs ===
			Regular season					Playoffs
Season	Team	League	GP	G	A	Pts	PIM	GP	G	A	Pts	PIM
1997–98	EC Heilbronner	2.GBun	5	0	0	0	0	—	—	—	—	—
1998–99	EC Heilbronner	2.GBun	21	0	2	2	2	—	—	—	—	—
1998–99	EC Iserlohner	2.GBun	16	1	0	1	12	—	—	—	—	—
1999–00	EC Iserlohner	2.GBun	33	0	3	3	2	—	—	—	—	—
2000–01	EC Heilbronner	2.GBun	50	17	21	38	40	9	5	5	10	6
2001–02	EC Heilbronner	2.GBun	52	20	9	29	28	5	0	0	0	2
2002–03	DEG Metro Stars	DEL	20	0	0	0	2	—	—	—	—	—
2002–03	ERC Ingolstadt	DEL	27	2	0	2	12	—	—	—	—	—
2002–03	EV Duisburg	2.GBun	4	2	0	2	4	—	—	—	—	—
2003–04	Frankfurt Lions	DEL	51	9	13	22	36	14	2	2	4	31
2004–05	Frankfurt Lions	DEL	49	20	18	38	40	—	—	—	—	—
2005–06	Grand Rapids Griffins	AHL	16	0	3	3	14	—	—	—	—	—
2005–06	Frankfurt Lions	DEL	21	6	9	15	26	—	—	—	—	—
2006–07	Frankfurt Lions	DEL	48	17	17	34	70	8	5	4	9	16
2007–08	Adler Mannheim	DEL	53	14	20	34	46	5	0	2	2	2
2008–09	Adler Mannheim	DEL	51	12	15	27	42	9	6	4	10	10
2009–10	Adler Mannheim	DEL	44	4	9	13	30	2	0	1	1	4
2010–11	Iserlohn Roosters	DEL	28	6	20	26	24	—	—	—	—	—
DEL totals			392	90	121	211	328	38	13	13	26	63

=== International ===
Year	Team	Comp	GP	G	A	Pts	PIM
2001	Germany	WJC-D1	5	2	1	3	0
2007	Germany	WC	6	3	4	7	2
2008	Germany	WC	6	3	1	4	2
2009	Germany	WC	6	0	1	1	4
Junior int'l totals			5	2	1	3	0
Senior int'l totals			18	6	6	12	8
