= Mytishchi Arena =

Indoor sporting arena located in Russia

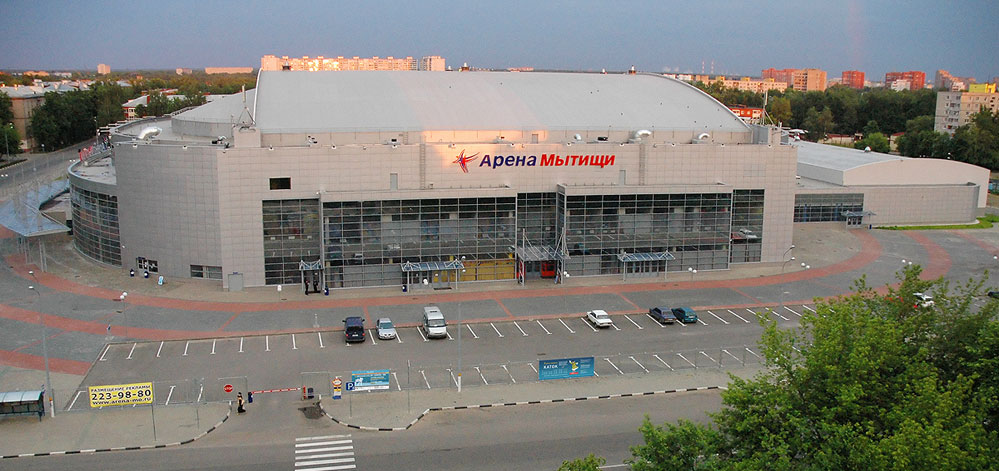
- Exterior of Mytishchi Arena.
- Interactive map of Mytishchi Arena
- Location: Mytishchi, Moscow, Russia
- Coordinates: 55°54′39.02″N 37°43′35″E
- Capacity: Ice hockey: 7,114; Basketball: 7,280; Boxing: 9,000; Concerts: 9,000

Construction
- Groundbreaking: April 19, 2002
- Opened: October 15, 2005

Tenants
- Atlant Moscow Oblast; Khimki; Kunlun Red Star (2020 — Present)

Mytishchi Arena (Russian: Арена Мытищи, Arena Mytishchi) is a multipurpose indoor sporting arena located in Mytishchi, which is 5 km (3 miles) outside of Moscow, Russia.

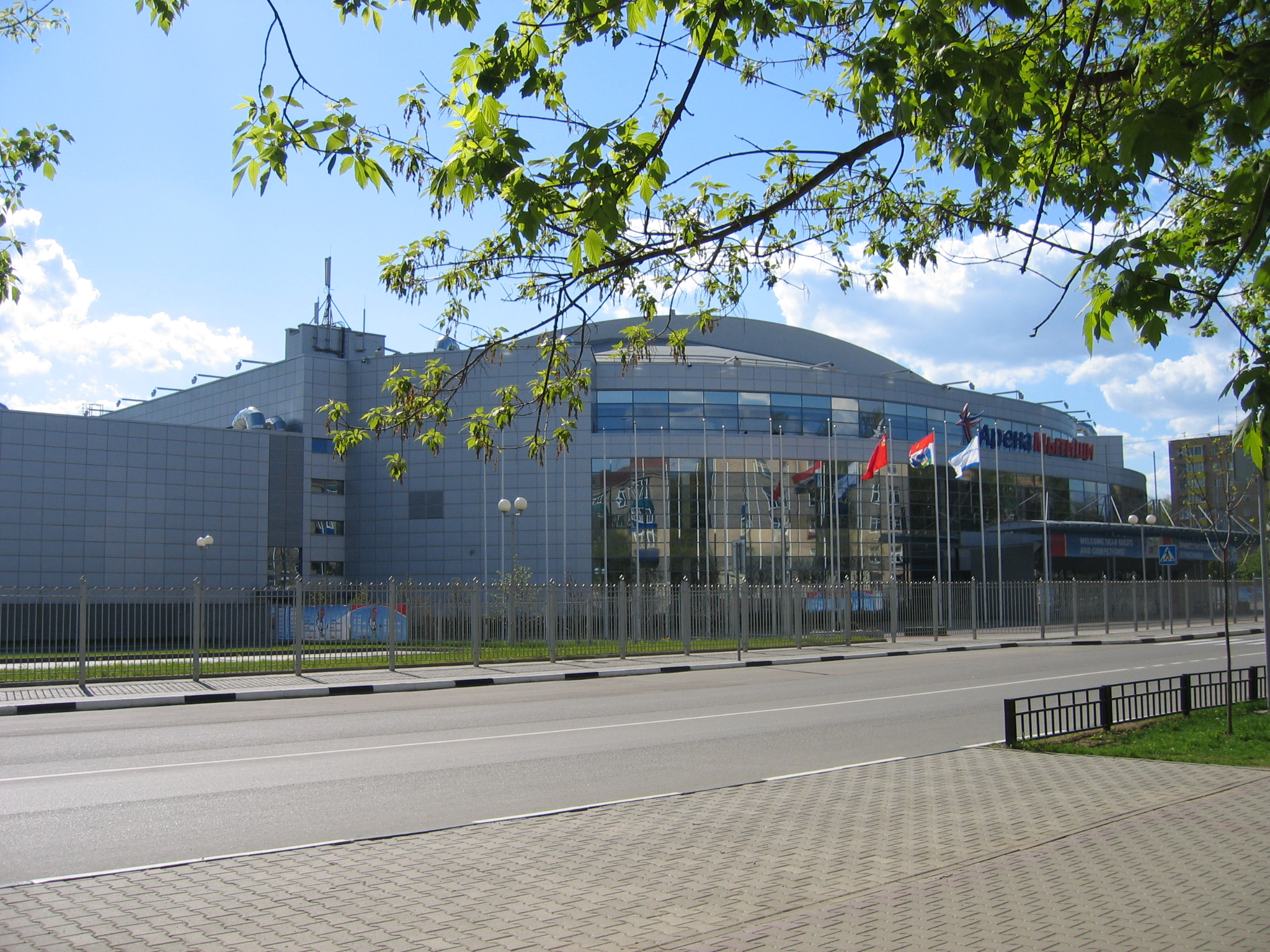
Mytishchi Arena, Moscow Oblast

The arena is used to host events such as ice hockey, figure skating, basketball, volleyball, handball, tennis, badminton, futsal, artistic gymnastics, gymnastics, ice dancing, ballroom dancing, wrestling, Olympic weightlifting, boxing, concerts, festivals, exhibitions, conferences, dance evenings, circus performances, fashion shows, and other events. The capacity of the arena is 7,000 for ice hockey, 7,280 for basketball, and 9,000 for boxing and concerts.

== History ==
Mytishchi Arena was opened on October 15, 2005. Along with the Khodynka Arena, it hosted the 2007 Men's World Ice Hockey Championships. The arena has been used as the home arena of the Russian Kontinental Hockey League club, Atlant Moscow Oblast. In 2017, the basketball club Khimki, started using the arena for their 2017–18 EuroLeague games.

Due to the travel restrictions during the COVID-19 pandemic, the ice hockey team Kunlun Red Star determined that they would be unable to play in Beijing, China for the 2020-21 KHL season. In August, the club signed a contract to play out of Arena Mytishchi.

== See also ==
- List of indoor arenas in Russia
- List of Kontinental Hockey League arenas
