= Ildar Gizatullin =

Russian footballer and coach

Personal information
- Full name: Ildar Nailevich Gizatullin
- Date of birth: 2 November 1976 (age 49)
- Height: 1.72 m (5 ft 7 1/2 in)
- Positions: Forward; midfielder

Team information
- Current team: FC Neftekhimik Nizhnekamsk (asst manager)

Senior career*
Years	Team	Apps	(Gls)
1996	FC Neftekhimik Nizhnekamsk	0	(0)
1998	FC Neftekhimik Nizhnekamsk	8	(0)
2004–2009	FC Neftekhimik Nizhnekamsk	66	(7)

Managerial career
- 2011–: FC Neftekhimik Nizhnekamsk (assistant)
- * Club domestic league appearances and goals

Ildar Nailevich Gizatullin (Russian: Ильдар Наилевич Гизатуллин; born 2 November 1976) is a Russian professional football coach and a former player. He is an assistant manager with FC Neftekhimik Nizhnekamsk.

== Club career ==
He played two seasons in the Russian Football National League for FC Neftekhimik Nizhnekamsk.
