= Ildar Mukhometov =

Russian ice hockey player

- Born: September 21, 1972 (age 52); Moscow, Russian SFSR, Soviet Union
- Height: 1.79 m (5 ft 10 in)
- Weight: 83 kg (183 lb; 13 st 1 lb)
- Position: Goaltender
- Caught: Left
- Played for: Dynamo Moscow; Hannover Scorpions; Neftekhimik Nizhnekamsk; CSKA Moscow; Severstal Cherepovets; Krylya Sovetov Moscow; Barys Astana
- National team: Russia
- Playing career: 1991–2010

Ildar Mukhometov (Russian: Ильдар Мухометов; born September 21, 1972) is a Russian former professional ice hockey goaltender.
