= Kostiantyn Kasianchuk =

Ukrainian ice hockey player

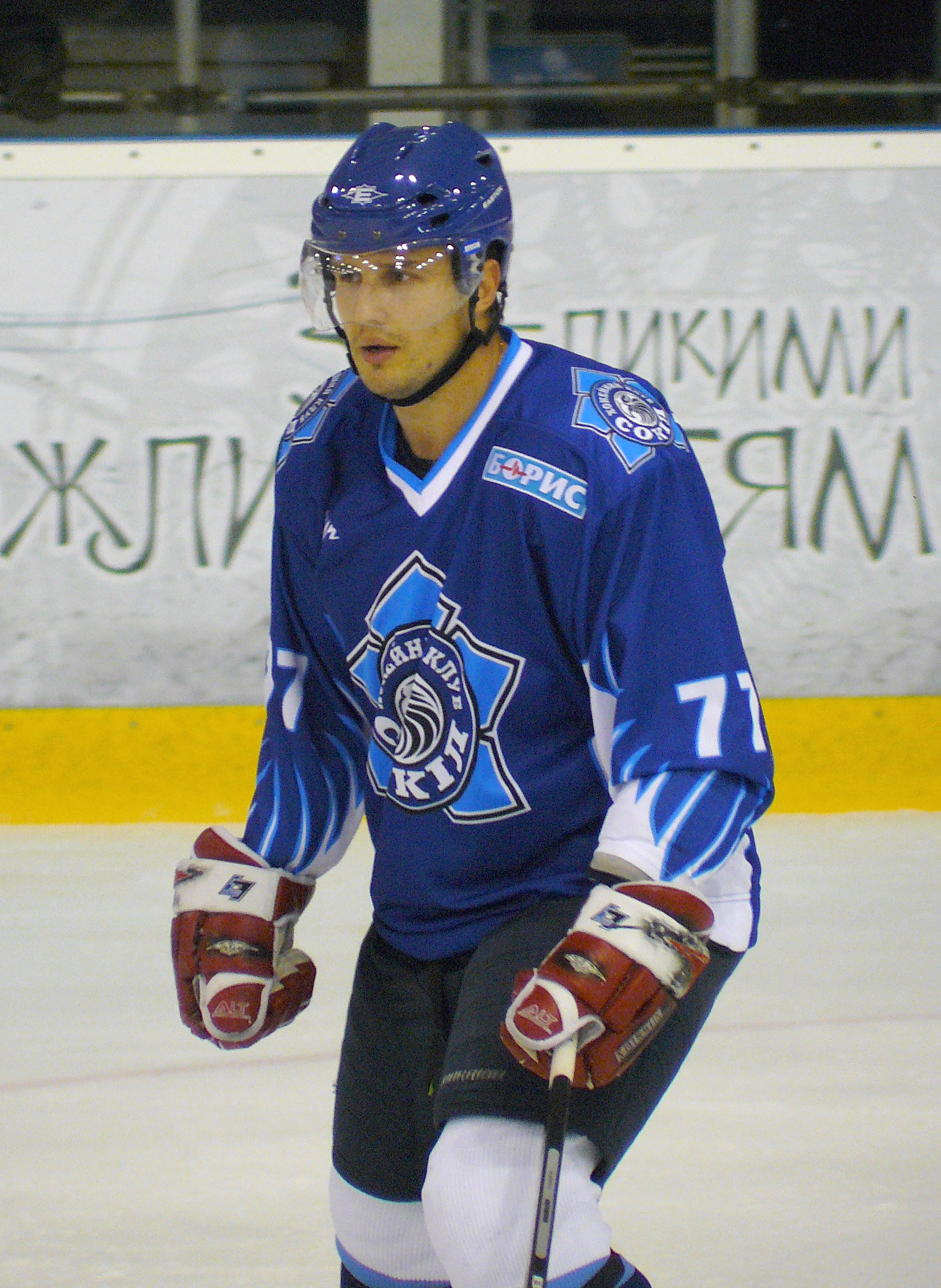
- Born: October 24, 1979 (age 45); Kyiv, Ukrainian SSR, USSR
- Height: 6 ft 1 in (185 cm)
- Weight: 192 lb (87 kg; 13 st 10 lb)
- Position: Left wing
- Shot: Right
- Played for: Sokil Kyiv; HC Berkut-Kyiv; Khimik Voskresensk; Traktor Chelyabinsk; Dynamo Moscow; CSKA Moscow; Neman Grono
- National team: Ukraine
- Playing career: 1997–2016

Kostiantyn Viktorovich Kasianchuk (Ukrainian: Костянтин Вікторович Касянчук; born 24 October 1979) is a Ukrainian retired professional ice hockey left wing who last played for HK Neman Grodno of the Belarusian Extraleague. Internationally he played for Ukraine in multiple World Championships.

== Career statistics ==
			Regular season					Playoffs
Season	Team	League	GP	G	A	Pts	PIM	GP	G	A	Pts	PIM
1995–96	Sokil Kyiv	EEHL	2	1	1	2	0	—	—	—	—	—
1997–98	Sokil Kyiv	EEHL	34	16	9	25	22	—	—	—	—	—
1998–99	Sokil Kyiv	EEHL	31	6	3	9	4	—	—	—	—	—
1999–00	Sokil Kyiv	EEHL	48	18	13	31	20	—	—	—	—	—
2000–01	Sokil Kyiv	EEHL	30	6	16	22	39	—	—	—	—	—
2001–02	Vityaz Chekhov	Russia2	54	13	27	40	44	11	3	4	7	6
2002–03	Sokil Kyiv	EEHL	13	3	4	7	10	—	—	—	—	—
2002–03	Vityaz Chekhov	Russia2	10	3	8	11	14	—	—	—	—	—
2002–03	Khimik Voskresensk	Russia2	13	5	2	7	2	14	7	1	8	4
2003–04	Khimik Voskresensk	Russia	37	1	2	3	16	—	—	—	—	—
2004–05	Sokil Kyiv	Belarus	24	6	7	13	16	12	1	5	6	10
2004–05	Sokil Kyiv	Ukraine	—	—	—	—	—	2	1	0	1	2
2005–06	Traktor Chelyabinsk	Russia2	43	11	22	33	18	9	4	4	8	6
2005–06	Traktor Chelyabinsk-2	Russia3	2	1	2	3	0	—	—	—	—	—
2006–07	Traktor Chelyabinsk	Russia	51	14	13	27	80	—	—	—	—	—
2007–08	Traktor Chelyabinsk	Russia	53	15	28	43	63	3	1	0	1	10
2008–09	HC Dynamo Moscow	KHL	46	12	6	18	26	6	1	0	1	4
2009–10	HC CSKA Moscow	KHL	12	0	4	4	8	—	—	—	—	—
2009–10	Traktor Chelyabinsk	KHL	36	6	10	16	26	4	1	0	1	6
2010–11	Sokil Kyiv	Belarus	13	5	8	13	16	—	—	—	—	—
2010–11	Traktor Chelyabinsk	KHL	41	4	9	13	30	—	—	—	—	—
2011–12	Sokil Kyiv	Ukraine	42	25	47	72	22	—	—	—	—	—
2012–13	HC Dynamo Moscow	KHL	35	7	6	13	49	19	3	4	7	4
2013–14	HC Dynamo Moscow	KHL	15	1	1	2	4	—	—	—	—	—
2013–14	Dynamo Balashikha	VHL	14	8	5	13	14	—	—	—	—	—
2014–15	Buran Voronezh	VHL	31	6	14	20	22	—	—	—	—	—
2015–16	HK Neman Grodno	Belarus	32	6	16	22	40	—	—	—	—	—
KHL totals			185	30	36	66	143	29	5	4	9	14
Russia totals			141	30	43	73	159	3	1	0	1	10
