= 2007 IIHF World Championship rosters =

Hockey tournament roster

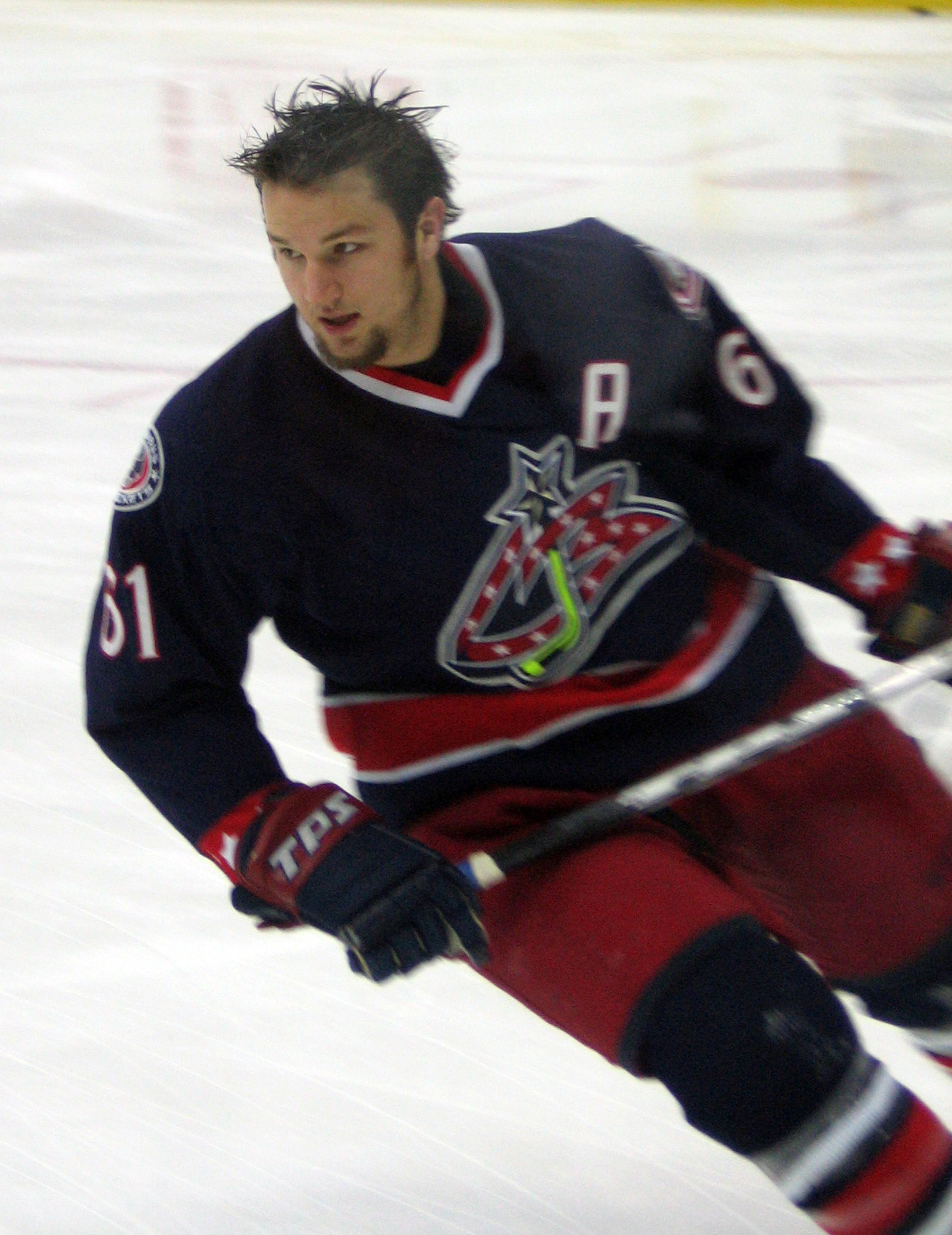
Rick Nash of Canada was named the tournament's most valuable player.

The 2007 IIHF World Championship rosters consisted of 393 players on 16 national ice hockey teams. Run by the International Ice Hockey Federation (IIHF), the Ice Hockey World Championships is the sport's highest-profile annual international tournament. The 2007 IIHF World Championship was the 71st edition of the tournament and was held in Moscow and Mytischi, Russia. Canada won the Championship, the 24th time they had done so.

Before the start of the World Championship, each participating nation had to submit a list of players for its roster. A minimum of fifteen skaters and two goaltenders, and a maximum of twenty skaters and three goaltenders had to be selected. If a country selects fewer than the maximum allowed, they must choose the remaining players prior to the start of the tournament. After the start of the tournament, each team was allowed to select an additional two players, either skaters or goaltenders, to their roster, for a maximum roster of 25 players. Once players were registered to the team, they could not be removed from the roster.

To qualify for a national team under IIHF rules, a player must follow several criteria. He must be a citizen of the nation, and be under the jurisdiction of that national association. Players are allowed to switch which national team they play for, providing they fulfill the IIHF criteria. If participating for the first time in an IIHF event, the player would have had to play two consecutive years in the national competition of the new country without playing in another country. If the player has already played for a national team before, he may switch countries if he is a citizen of the new country, and has played for four consecutive years in the national competition of the new country. This switch may only happen once in the player's life.

Rick Nash of Canada was named the tournament's most valuable player by the IIHF directorate. Aleksey Morozov of Russia led the tournament in goal scoring, and was named the top forward. Russian Andrei Markov was named top defenceman and Kari Lehtonen of Finland was selected as top goaltender. Sweden's Johan Davidsson was the tournament's leading scorer and Alexander Eremenko of Russia led goaltenders in save percentage, with 0.957.

== Legend ==
General
Number	Uniform number
Club	Player's club before tournament. (from the official IIHF listing).

Positions
F	Forward
D	Defenceman
GK	Goaltender

Statistics
GP	Games played	W	Wins
G	Goals	L	Losses
A	Assists	Min	Minutes played
Pts	Points	GA	Goals against
PIM	Penalties in minutes	GAA	Goals against average
		SV%	Save percentage
		SO	Shutouts

== Austria ==
=== Skaters ===
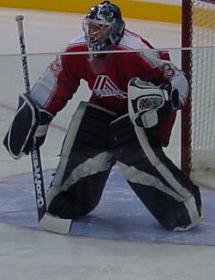
Goaltender Reinhard Divis started four games, winning one.

Number	Position	Player	Club	GP	G	A	Pts	PIM
67	F	Gregor Baumgartner	Linz EHC	6	0	1	1	0
54	F	Raimund Divis	Linz EHC	6	2	1	3	0
16	F	Patrick Harand	EC Red Bull Salzburg	6	0	0	0	2
74	F	Dieter Kalt	EC Red Bull Salzburg	6	1	0	1	6
18	F	Thomaz Koch	EC Red Bull Salzburg	6	2	2	4	0
32	D	Andre Lakos	EC Red Bull Salzburg	6	3	1	4	4
11	D	Philippe Lakos	Vienna Capitals	6	0	0	0	12
19	F	Philipp Lukas	Linz EHC	6	2	1	3	0
55	D	Robert Lukas	Vienna Capitals	6	1	1	2	12
25	D	Jamie Mattie	Graz 99ers	6	0	0	0	0
34	F	Markus Peintner	EC Villacher SV	6	2	0	2	6
36	F	Marco Pewal	EC Red Bull Salzburg	6	0	0	0	0
22	D	Thomas Pfeffer	EC Villacher SV	3	0	1	1	0
27	D	Jeremy Rebek	KAC Klagenfurt	6	0	1	1	2
45	F	David Schuller	Vienna Capitals	6	0	1	1	14
91	F	Oliver Setzinger	Vienna Capitals	6	1	3	4	0
44	D	Mike Stewart	EC Villacher SV	6	1	1	2	6
21	F	Matthias Trattnig	EC Red Bull Salzburg	6	0	1	1	12
47	D	Martin Ulrich	EC Red Bull Salzburg	3	0	0	0	0
4	D	Gerhard Unterluggauer	Innsbrucker EV	6	0	1	1	4
20	F	Daniel Welser	Skellefteå AIK	6	1	1	2	0

=== Goaltenders ===
Number	Player	Club	GP	W	L	Min	GA	GAA	SV%	SO
31	Bernd Brückler	Espoo Blues	2	0	2	120	11	5.50	0.820	0
38	Reinhard Divis	EC Red Bull Salzburg	4	1	3	242	18	4.46	0.861	0
66	Patrick Machreich	Linz EHC	0	0	0	0	0	0	0	0

== Belarus ==
=== Skaters ===
Number	Position	Player	Club	GP	G	A	Pts	PIM
10	F	Oleg Antonenko	Dinamo Minsk	6	5	3	8	0
45	F	Aliaksandr Baraukou	Khimvolokno Mogilev	6	0	0	0	2
21	F	Sergei Demagin	Dinamo Minsk	3	0	0	0	2
70	F	Vladimir Denisov	Lada Togliatti	6	0	1	1	14
77	F	Dmitry Dudik	Dinamo Minsk	6	2	1	3	8
7	F	Sergei Erkovich	Junost Minsk	2	0	0	0	4
15	F	Andrei Hlebau	Dinamo Minsk	6	1	0	1	4
28	F	Konstantin Koltsov	Salavat Yulaev Ufa	3	2	2	4	2
43	F	Viktor Kostyuchenok	Lada Togliatti	6	1	3	4	0
26	F	Sergei Kukushin	Lada Togliatti	6	0	1	1	2
11	F	Alexander Kulakov	Dinamo Minsk	6	2	2	4	6
93	F	Evgeni Kurilin	Dinamo Minsk	6	0	1	1	4
3	F	Oleg Leontiev	Junost Minsk	6	0	2	2	2
4	F	Aleksandr Makritsky	Dinamo Minsk	6	0	0	0	8
19	F	Dmitry Meleshko	Salavat Yulaev Ufa	6	2	4	6	2
8	F	Andrei Mikhalev	Keramin Minsk	2	0	0	0	4
5	F	Alexander Ryadinsky	Keramin Minsk	5	1	1	2	6
14	F	Aleksei Strakhov	Keramin Minsk	6	0	0	0	6
18	F	Alexei Ugarov	Neftekhimik Nzhnekamsk	6	3	2	5	6
30	F	Artem Volkov	Junost Minsk	6	0	0	0	12
22	F	Sergei Zadelenov	Neftekhimik Nizhnekamsk	6	0	6	6	0
27	F	Aleksandr Zhurik	Dinamo Minsk	6	0	0	0	6

=== Goaltenders ===
Number	Player	Club	GP	W	L	Min	GA	GAA	SV%	SO
33	Stepan Goryachevskikh	Junost Minsk	1	0	1	60	6	6.00	0.850	0
31	Andrei Mezin	Salavat Yulaev Ufa	5	1	4	277	22	4.76	0.831	0
2	Sergei Shabanov	Metallurg Novokuznetsk	1	0	1	21	2	5.64	0.800	0

== Canada ==
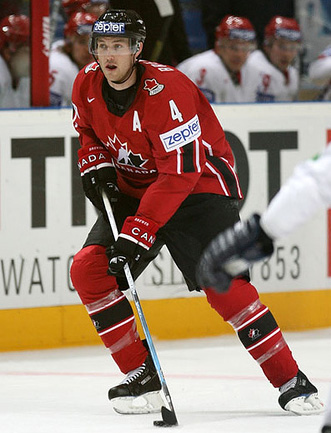
Eric Brewer played in his fifth World Championship, and won his third gold medal.

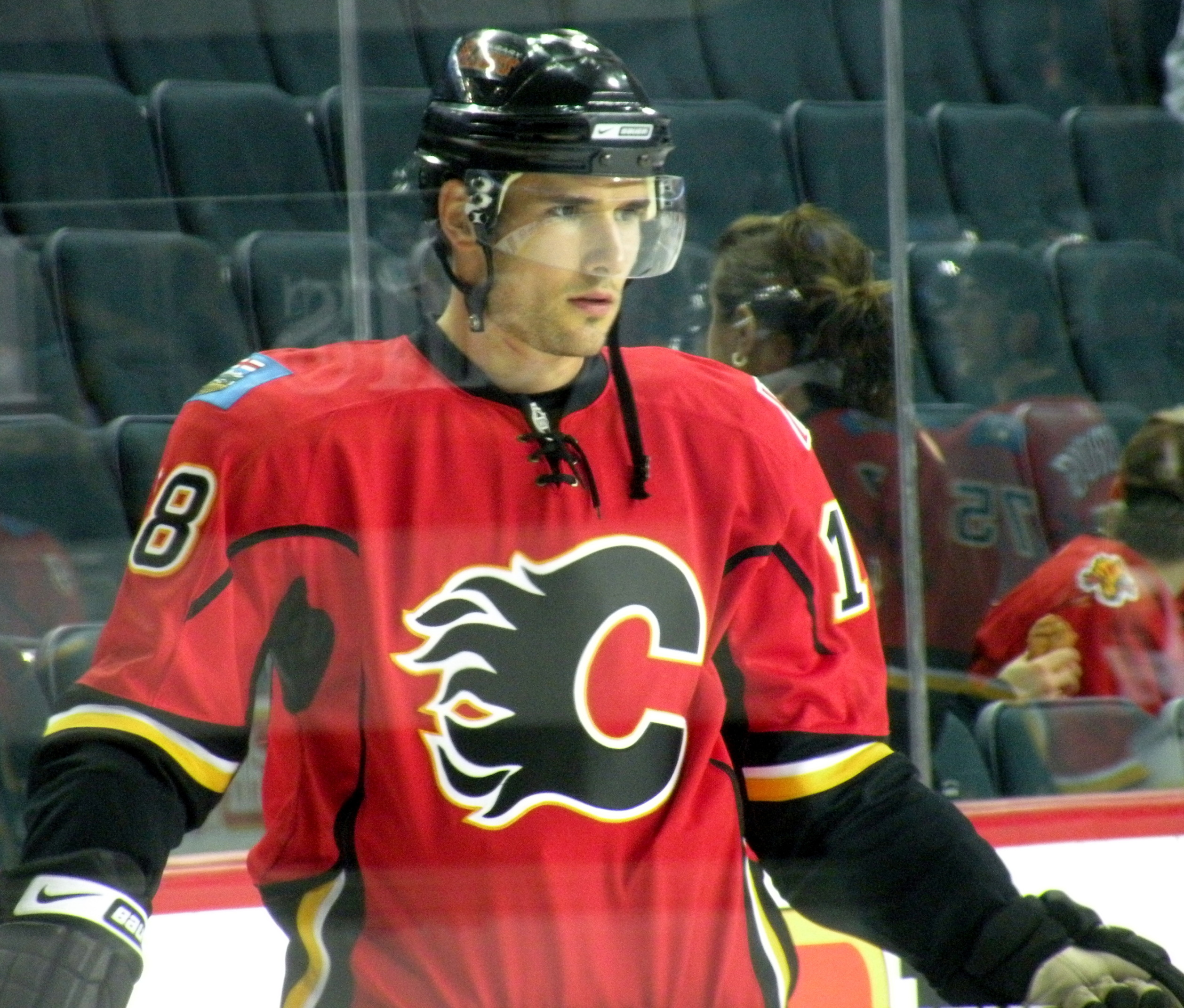
Matthew Lombardi led the Canadian team in scoring with six goals and 12 points.

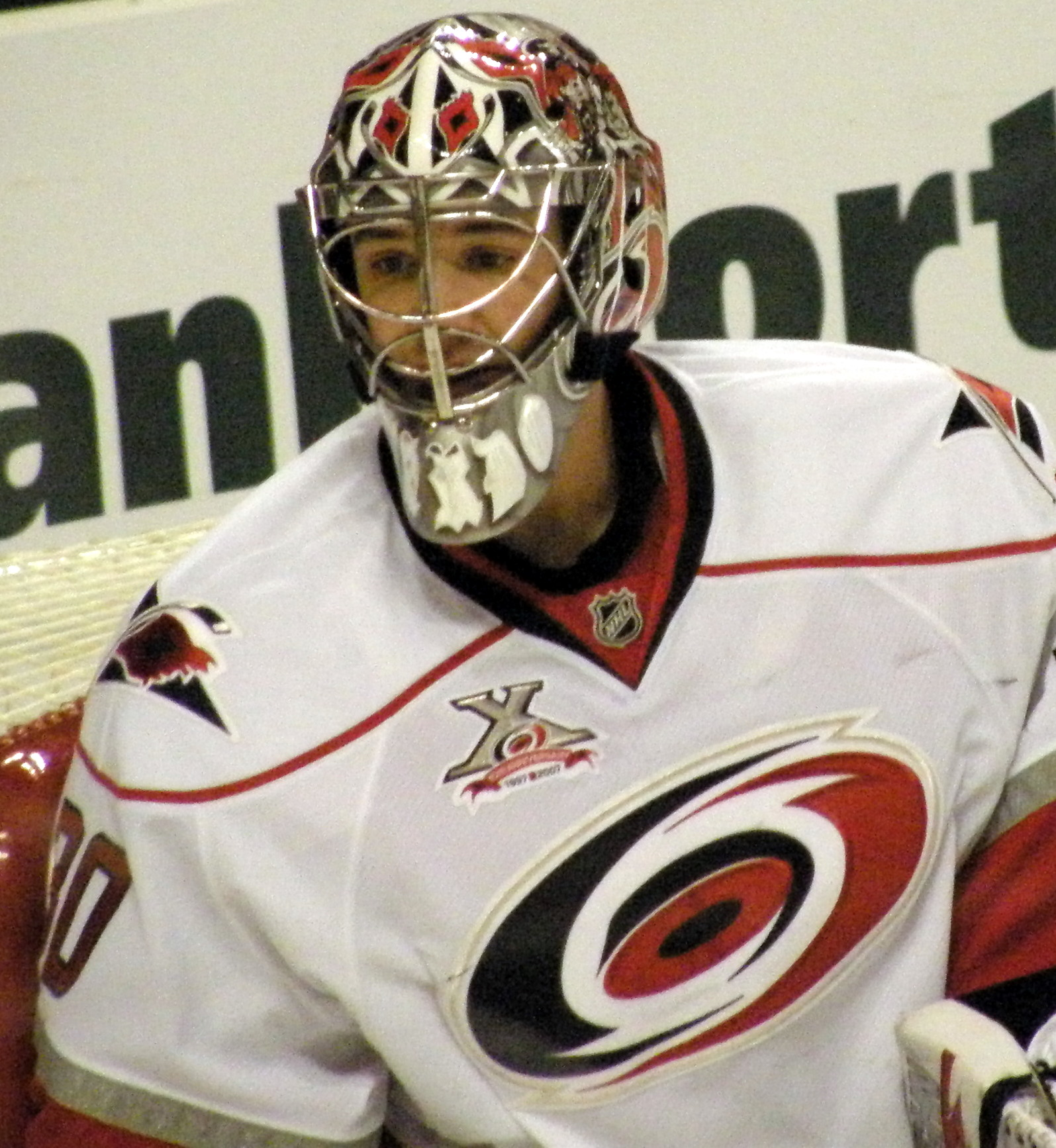
Goaltender Cam Ward won every game he played, finishing with a 2.20 GAA.

=== Skaters ===
Number	Position	Player	Club	GP	G	A	Pts	PIM
20	F	Colby Armstrong	Pittsburgh Penguins	9	1	1	2	4
4	D	Eric Brewer	St. Louis Blues	9	1	3	4	6
13	F	Michael Cammalleri	Los Angeles Kings	9	4	3	7	6
25	F	Jason Chimera	Columbus Blue Jackets	9	1	5	6	8
22	D	Mike Commodore	Carolina Hurricanes	9	0	2	2	14
19	F	Shane Doan	Phoenix Coyotes	9	5	5	10	8
2	D	Dan Hamhuis	Nashville Predators	9	1	2	3	2
5	D	Barret Jackman	St. Louis Blues	9	0	2	2	6
18	F	Matthew Lombardi	Calgary Flames	9	6	6	12	4
21	F	Jamal Mayers	St. Louis Blues	9	4	1	5	8
9	F	Jay McClement	St. Louis Blues	9	2	2	4	4
23	D	Cory Murphy	Florida Panthers	9	1	6	7	8
61	F	Rick Nash	Columbus Blue Jackets	9	6	5	11	4
3	D	Dion Phaneuf	Calgary Flames	7	0	8	8	2
55	D	Nick Schultz	Minnesota Wild	9	0	0	0	2
12	F	Eric Staal	Carolina Hurricanes	9	5	5	10	6
10	F	Jordan Staal	Pittsburgh Penguins	9	0	2	2	0
16	F	Jonathan Toews	University of North Dakota	9	2	5	7	6
6	D	Shea Weber	Nashville Predators	6	1	1	2	31
11	F	Justin Williams	Carolina Hurricanes	9	1	2	3	16

=== Goaltenders ===
Number	Player	Club	GP	W	L	Min	GA	GAA	SV%	SO
50	Chris Mason	Nashville Predators	0	0	0	0	0	0	0	0
35	Dwayne Roloson	Edmonton Oilers	4	4	0	240	10	2.50	0.911	0
30	Cam Ward	Carolina Hurricanes	5	5	0	300	11	2.20	0.915	0

== Czech Republic ==
=== Skaters ===
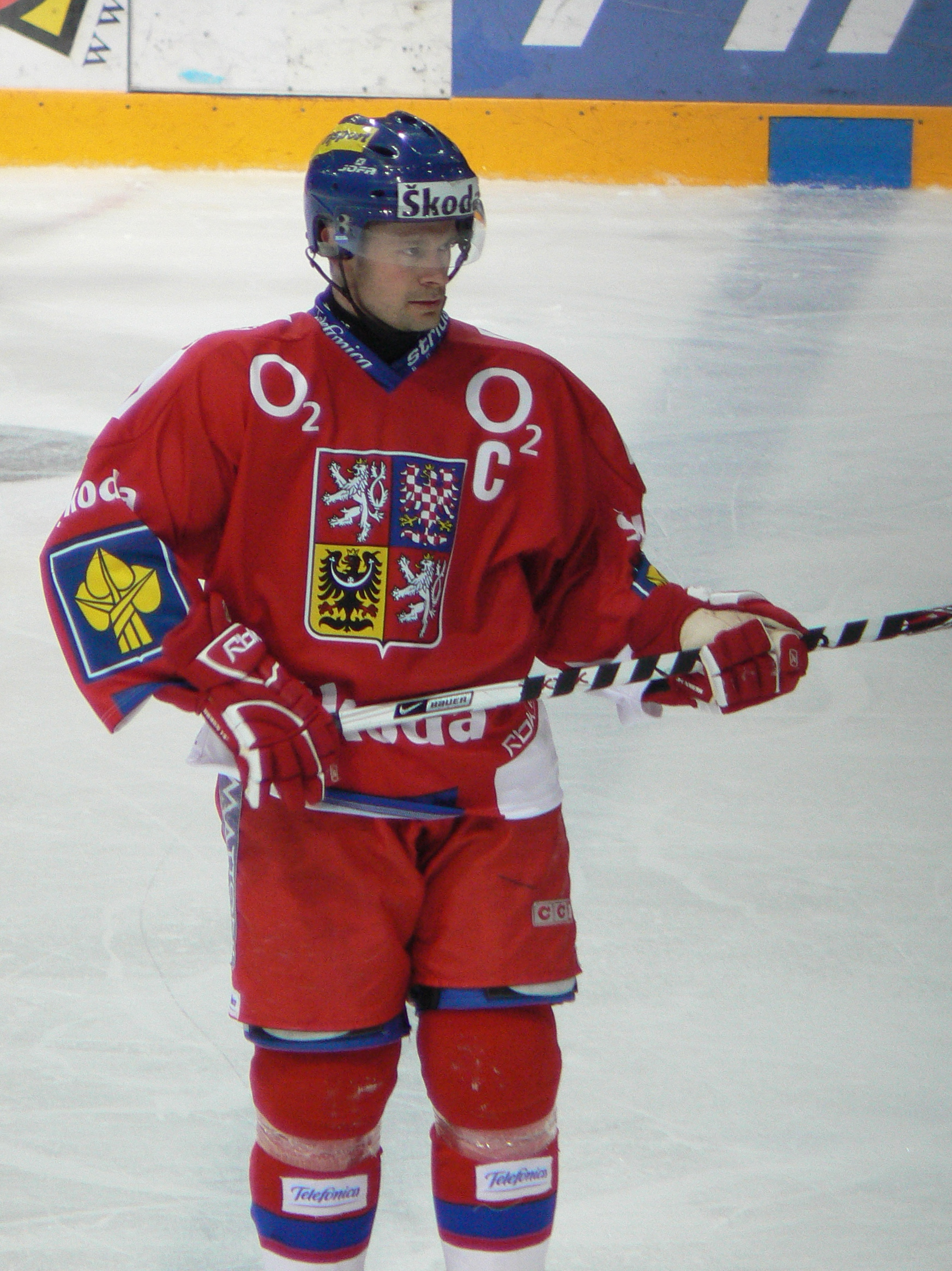
Defenceman Radek Hamr played seven games for the Czech team.

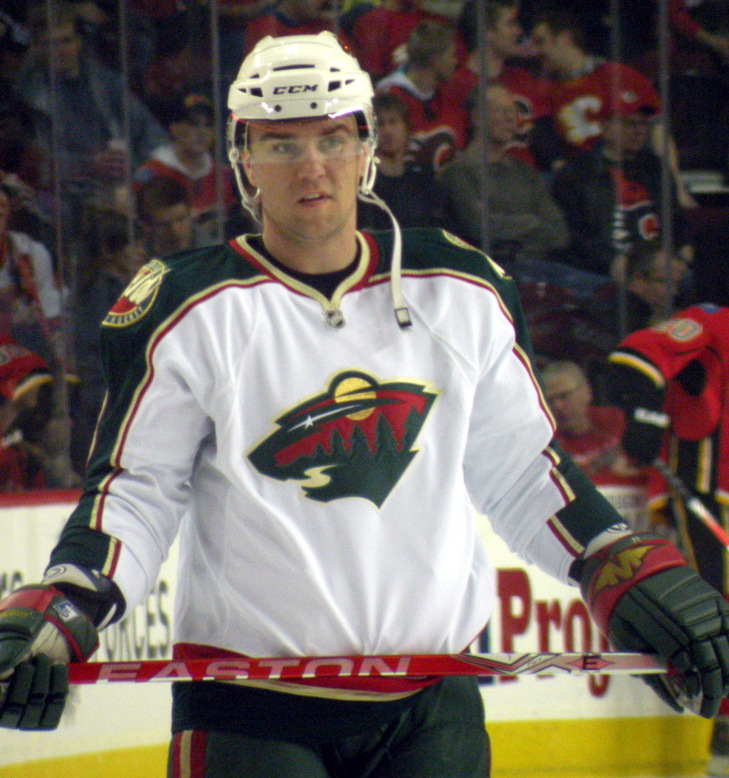
Marek Židlický recorded a goal and five assists and finished tied for third in team scoring.

Number	Position	Player	Club	GP	G	A	Pts	PIM
40	F	Jaroslav Balaštík	HV71	6	0	0	0	4
5	D	Michal Barinka	SC Bern	7	1	2	3	8
25	F	Jaroslav Bednář	HC Slavia Praha	7	1	0	1	0
16	F	Petr Čajánek	St. Louis Blues	6	0	2	2	12
36	D	Petr Čáslava	HC Pardubice	7	2	0	2	6
77	D	Radek Hamr	Kloten Flyers	7	0	0	0	0
17	F	Jaroslav Hlinka	HC Sparta Praha	7	3	4	7	0
10	F	Petr Hubáček	SC Bern	7	0	0	0	2
24	F	Zbyněk Irgl	HC Davos	7	2	2	4	4
97	D	Rostislav Klesla	Columbus Blue Jackets	4	1	0	1	8
15	F	Jan Marek	Metallurg Magnitogorsk	6	2	3	5	4
4	D	Zbyněk Michálek	Phoenix Coyotes	7	0	1	1	4
13	F	Jiří Novotný	Washington Capitals	6	0	0	0	8
85	F	Rostislav Olesz	Florida Panthers	7	2	3	5	4
83	D	Jan Platil	CSKA Moscow	4	0	0	0	8
14	F	Tomáš Plekanec	Montreal Canadiens	7	4	4	8	2
60	F	Tomáš Rolinek	HC Pardubice	3	0	0	0	0
6	D	Ladislav Šmíd	Edmonton Oilers	6	0	0	0	31
37	F	Petr Sýkora	HC Pardubice	7	2	3	5	4
62	F	Petr Tenkrát	Boston Bruins	7	1	0	1	4
9	F	David Výborný	Columbus Blue Jackets	7	1	5	6	2
3	D	Marek Židlický	Nashville Predators	7	1	5	6	6

=== Goaltenders ===
Number	Player	Club	GP	W	L	Min	GA	GAA	SV%	SO
32	Roman Čechmánek	HC Oceláři Třinec	7	3	4	418	18	2.58	0.894	0
79	Marek Pinc	EHC Biel	1	0	0	0	0	0	0	0
31	Adam Svoboda	HC Slavia Praha	0	0	1	0:23	1	156.52	0.500	0

== Denmark ==
=== Skaters ===
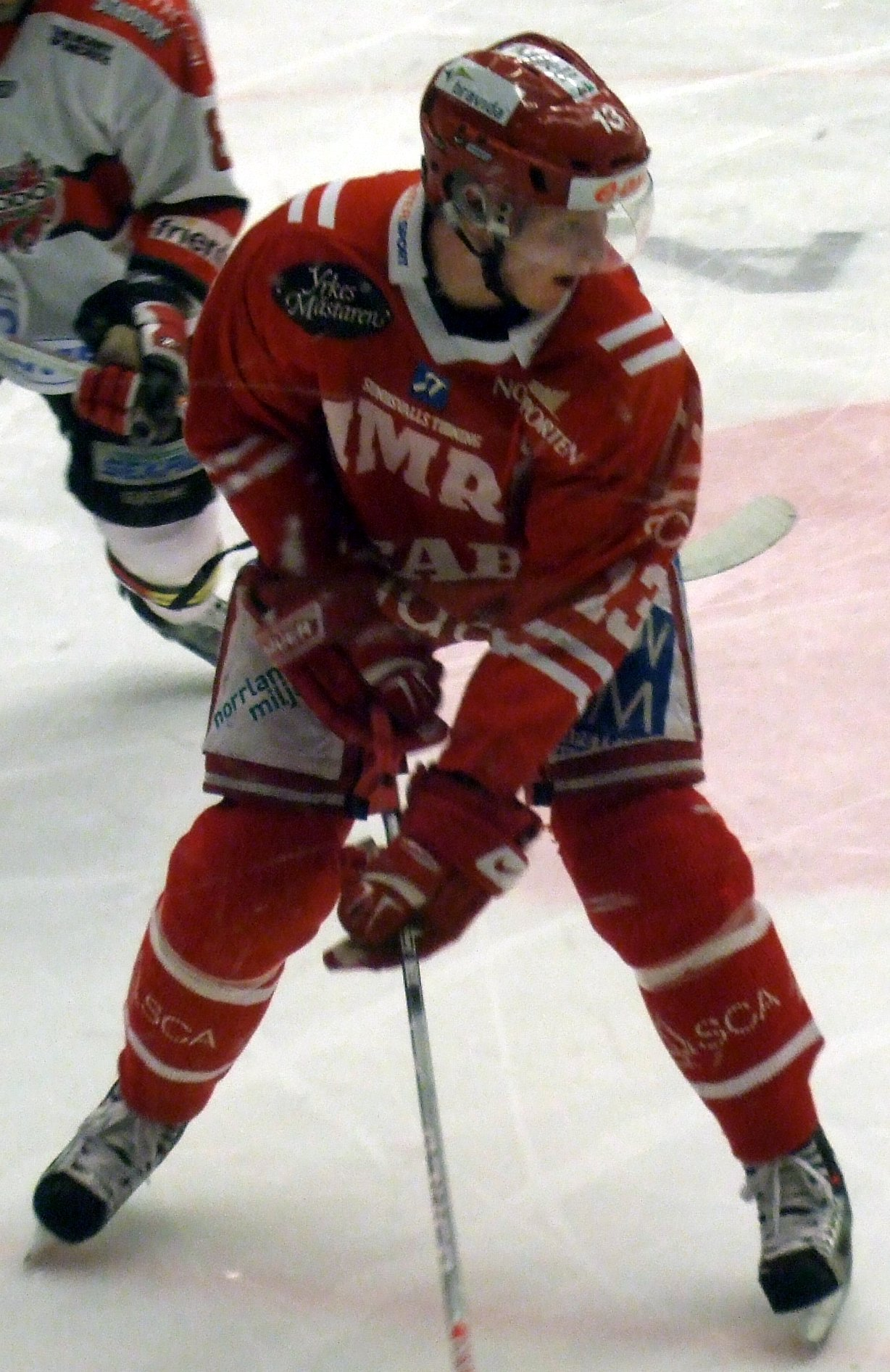
Peter Regin recorded three goals and three assists, leading his team in scoring.

Number	Position	Player	Club	GP	G	A	Pts	PIM
25	D	Andreas Andreasen	Esbjerg IK	6	0	1	1	8
4	D	Mads Bødker	Rögle BK Angelholm	6	0	0	0	0
18	F	Mads Christensen	Herning Blue Fox	6	1	1	2	14
7	D	Jesper Damgaard	Augsburger Panther	6	2	2	4	4
21	F	Thor Dresler	Herlev Hornets	5	0	1	1	4
13	F	Morten Green	Leksands IF	6	0	1	1	33
16	F	Christoffer Kjærgaard	Herning Blue Fox	5	1	1	2	2
6	D	Stefan Lassen	Herning Blue Fox	6	0	0	0	4
29	F	Morten Madsen	Victoriaville Tigres	5	1	0	1	4
55	D	Mads Møller	Aalborg IK	6	0	0	0	0
5	D	Daniel Nielsen	Herning Blue Fox	6	0	3	3	4
51	F	Frans Nielsen	New York Islanders	6	0	3	3	6
27	F	Jens Nielsen	Aalborg IK	6	1	2	3	4
10	F	Bo Nordby Tranholm	Aalborg IK	4	1	0	1	2
20	F	Rasmus Olsen	Aalborg IK	6	1	0	1	2
2	D	Rasmus Pander	Herning Blue Fox	5	1	3	4	2
9	F	Peter Regin	Timrå IK	5	3	3	6	6
11	F	Michael Smidt	Rødovre Mighty Bulls	6	0	0	0	2
19	F	Kim Staal	Milwaukee Admirals	5	2	3	5	2
14	F	Kirill Starkov	Red Deer Rebels	6	1	1	2	0
24	F	Alexander Sundberg	Rødovre Mighty Bulls	3	0	0	0	2

=== Goaltenders ===
Number	Player	Club	GP	W	L	Min	GA	GAA	SV%	SO
31	Peter Hirsch	Leksands IF	3	2	1	152	13	5.12	0.824	0
30	Michael Madsen	Herlev Hornets	4	0	4	207	15	4.34	0.873	0
1	Simon Nielsen	Rødovre Mighty Bulls	0	0	0	0	0	0	0	0

== Finland ==
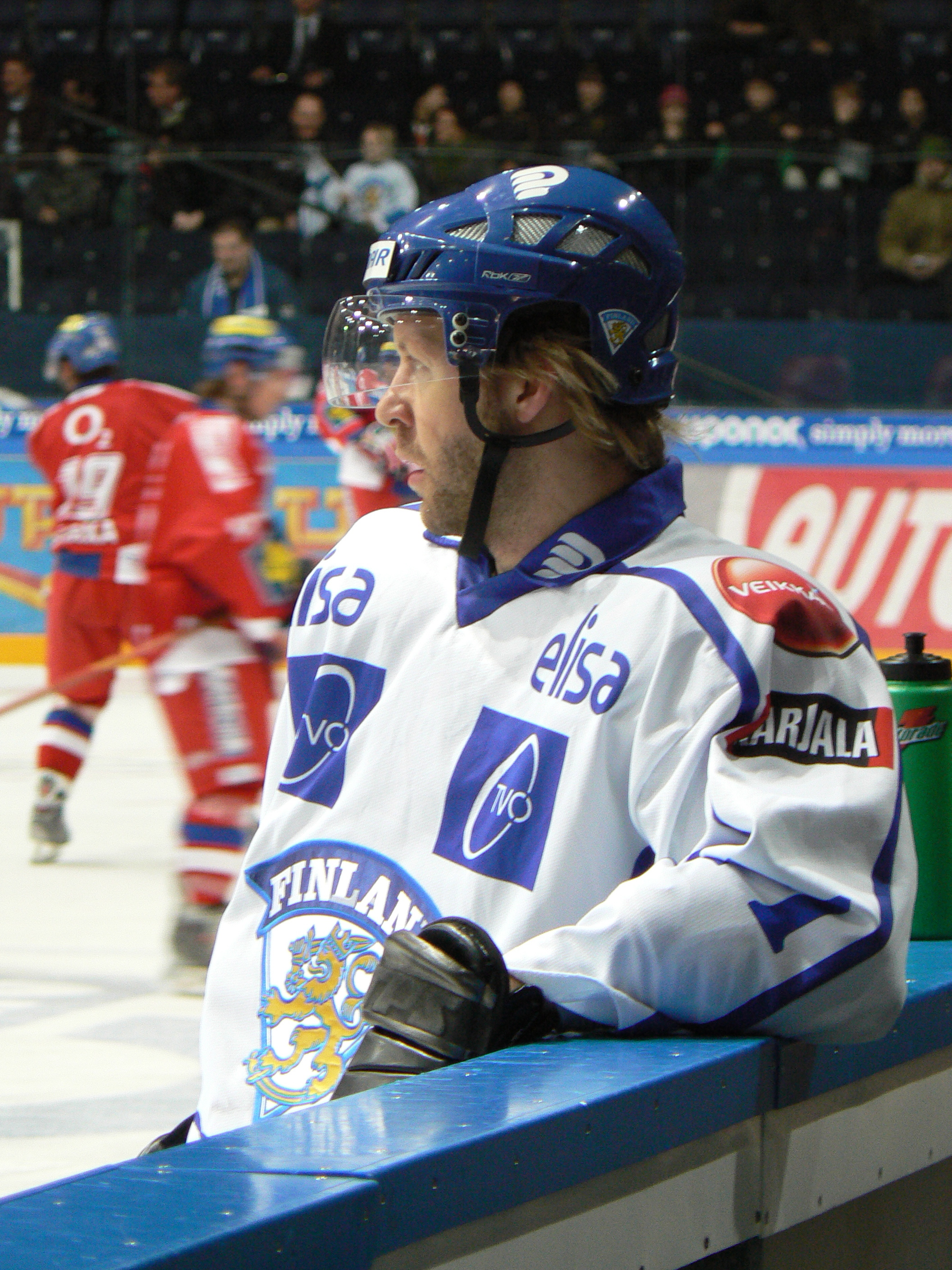
Tomi Kallio played in all nine of Finland's games, and recorded a goal and two assists.

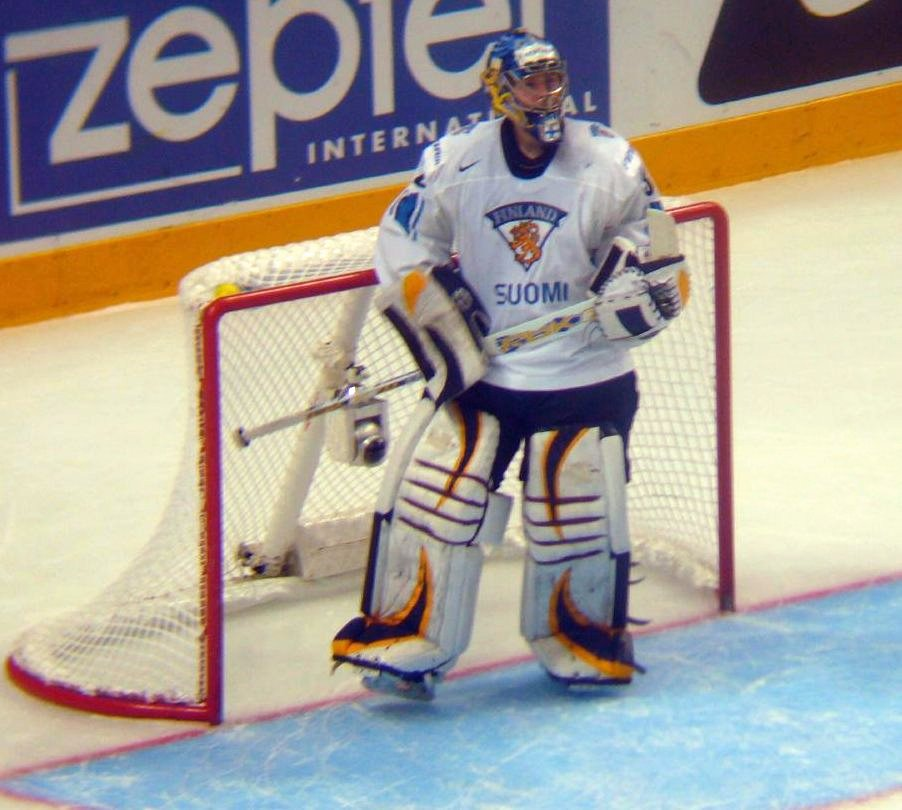
Kari Lehtonen was named the tournament's top goaltender.

=== Skaters ===
Number	Position	Player	Club	GP	G	A	Pts	PIM
7	D	Aki Berg	TPS	9	1	0	1	18
10	F	Sean Bergenheim	Frölunda HC	9	1	2	3	31
25	F	Jukka Hentunen	HC Lugano	9	4	1	5	4
71	F	Tomi Kallio	Frölunda HC	9	1	2	3	33
39	F	Niko Kapanen	Phoenix Coyotes	9	0	7	7	6
4	D	Ville Koistinen	Milwaukee Admirals	2	0	0	0	2
9	F	Mikko Koivu	Minnesota Wild	9	2	2	4	26
41	F	Petri Kontiola	Tappara	9	2	5	7	2
5	D	Lasse Kukkonen	Philadelphia Flyers	9	0	1	1	4
44	D	Jukka-Pekka Laamanen	Oulun Kärpät	4	0	1	1	4
26	F	Jere Lehtinen	Dallas Stars	7	2	2	4	0
18	D	Tuukka Mäntylä	Tappara	5	0	2	2	2
20	F	Antti Miettinen	Dallas Stars	8	1	1	2	6
3	D	Petteri Nummelin	Minnesota Wild	7	3	5	8	4
27	F	Timo Pärssinen	Timrå IK	9	2	0	2	2
16	F	Ville Peltonen	Florida Panthers	9	2	7	9	4
22	F	Mika Pyörälä	Oulun Kärpät	8	0	1	1	2
37	F	Jarkko Ruutu	Pittsburgh Penguins	9	0	1	1	29
15	F	Tuomo Ruutu	Chicago Blackhawks	8	3	3	6	20
33	D	Pekka Saravo	Luleå HF	9	2	1	3	8
34	D	Toni Söderholm	SC Bern	9	0	1	1	4
24	F	Jari Viuhkola	Kärpät	8	3	0	3	0

=== Goaltenders ===
Number	Player	Club	GP	W	L	Min	GA	GAA	SV%	SO
32	Kari Lehtonen	Atlanta Thrashers	6	4	2	374	12	1.93	0.930	1
30	Fredrik Norrena	Columbus Blue Jackets	3	2	1	180	5	1.67	0.913	2
35	Sinuhe Wallinheimo	JYP	0	0	0	0	0	0	0	0

== Germany ==
=== Skaters ===
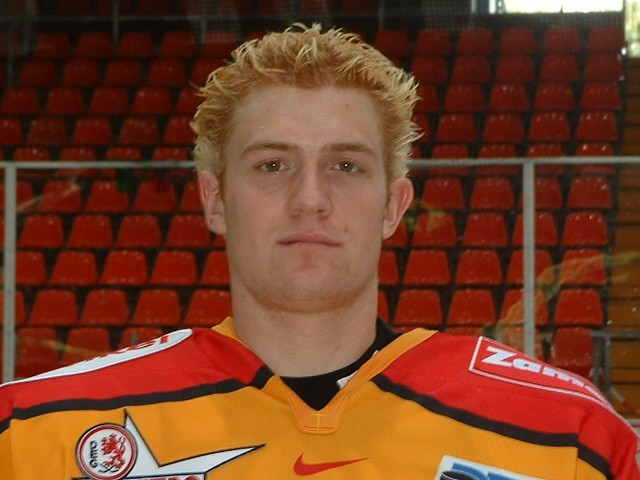
Alexander Sulzer played six games for the German team.

Number	Position	Player	Club	GP	G	A	Pts	PIM
27	D	Martin Ančička	Adler Mannheim	5	0	3	3	6
22	D	Michael Bakos	ERC Ingolstadt	5	0	2	2	6
29	F	Alexander Bárta	Hamburg Freezers	6	2	0	2	4
25	D	Robin Breitbach	Genève-Servette HC	5	0	0	0	8
46	F	Florian Busch	Eisbären Berlin	6	1	0	1	4
20	D	Robert Dietrich	DEG Metro Stars	6	2	2	4	2
9	D	Tobias Draxinger	Eisbären Berlin	6	0	0	0	6
11	F	Sven Felski	Eisbären Berlin	6	1	3	4	8
72	F	Petr Fical	Sinupret Ice Tigers	6	0	0	0	10
87	F	Philip Gogulla	Kölner Haie	6	0	5	5	4
33	F	Michael Hackert	Frankfurt Lions	6	3	4	7	2
48	D	Frank Hördler	Eisbären Berlin	6	0	0	0	14
26	F	Daniel Kreutzer	DEG Metro Stars	6	0	2	2	6
8	D	Sebastien Osterloh	Frankfurt Lions	6	0	0	0	6
43	D	Felix Petermann	Adler Mannheim	3	0	0	0	4
56	F	Aleksander Polaczek	Sinupret Ice Tigers	3	0	0	0	2
24	F	André Rankel	Eisbären Berlin	6	0	0	0	4
85	F	Yannic Seidenberg	ERC Ingolstadt	1	0	0	0	0
52	D	Alexander Sulzer	DEG Metro Stars	6	0	0	0	4
21	F	John Tripp	ERC Ingolstadt	6	1	2	3	2
47	F	Christoph Ullmann	Adler Mannheim	6	1	0	1	4
16	F	Michael Wolf	Iserlohn Roosters	6	5	3	8	6

=== Goaltenders ===
Number	Player	Club	GP	W	L	Min	GA	GAA	SV%	SO
1	Oliver Jonas	Kölner Haie	1	0	1	60	5	5.00	0.849	0
30	Dimitrij Kotschnew	Iserlohn Roosters	2	1	1	120	3	1.50	0.940	1
40	Dimitri Pätzold	Worcester Sharks	3	2	1	180	11	3.67	0.841	0

== Italy ==
=== Skaters ===
Number	Position	Player	Club	GP	G	A	Pts	PIM
71	F	Luca Ansoldi	SG Cortina	6	2	0	2	2
50	D	Christian Borgatello	HC Junior Milano Vipers	6	1	1	2	4
18	F	Paolo Bustreo	Ritten Sport	2	0	0	0	4
24	F	Mario Chitarroni	HC Junior Milano Vipers	6	0	0	0	6
34	F	Jason Cirone	Rio Grande Valley Killer Bees	6	2	2	4	4
9	F	Giorgio de Bettin	SG Cortina	6	2	0	2	4
28	F	Manuel de Toni	HC Alleghe	6	0	0	0	2
27	F	Flavio Faggioni	HC Bolzano Foxes	6	0	0	0	4
26	D	Armin Helfer	HC Junior Milano Vipers	6	0	0	0	2
7	F	Patrice Lefebvre	HC Lausanne	5	0	0	0	2
14	D	Carlo Lorenzi	HC Alleghe	6	0	1	1	2
22	F	Stefano Margoni	SG Pontebba	6	0	2	2	4
16	F	John Parco	HC Asiago	6	0	0	0	2
39	F	Jonathan Pittis	HC Asiago	3	0	0	0	0
8	D	Florian Ramoser	HC Bolzano Foxes	6	0	0	0	2
11	F	Roland Ramoser	HC Bolzano Foxes	6	1	1	2	6
13	F	Luca Rigoni	HC Junior Milano Vipers	6	0	0	0	2
10	F	Giulio Scandella	HC Junior Milano Vipers	6	0	1	1	2
12	D	André Signoretti	Herning Blue Fox	4	0	1	1	0
6	D	Michele Strazzabosco	HC Junior Milano Vipers	6	0	1	1	6
3	D	Carter Trevisani	Södertälje SK	6	0	0	0	20

=== Goaltenders ===
Number	Player	Club	GP	W	L	Min	GA	GAA	SV%	SO
55	Andrea Carpano	SG Pontebba	2	0	2	67	10	8.98	0.811	0
73	Günther Hell	HC Bolzano Foxes	4	1	3	237	10	2.53	0.910	0
29	Jason Muzzatti	Flint Generals	1	0	1	60	3	3.00	0.917	0

== Latvia ==
=== Skaters ===
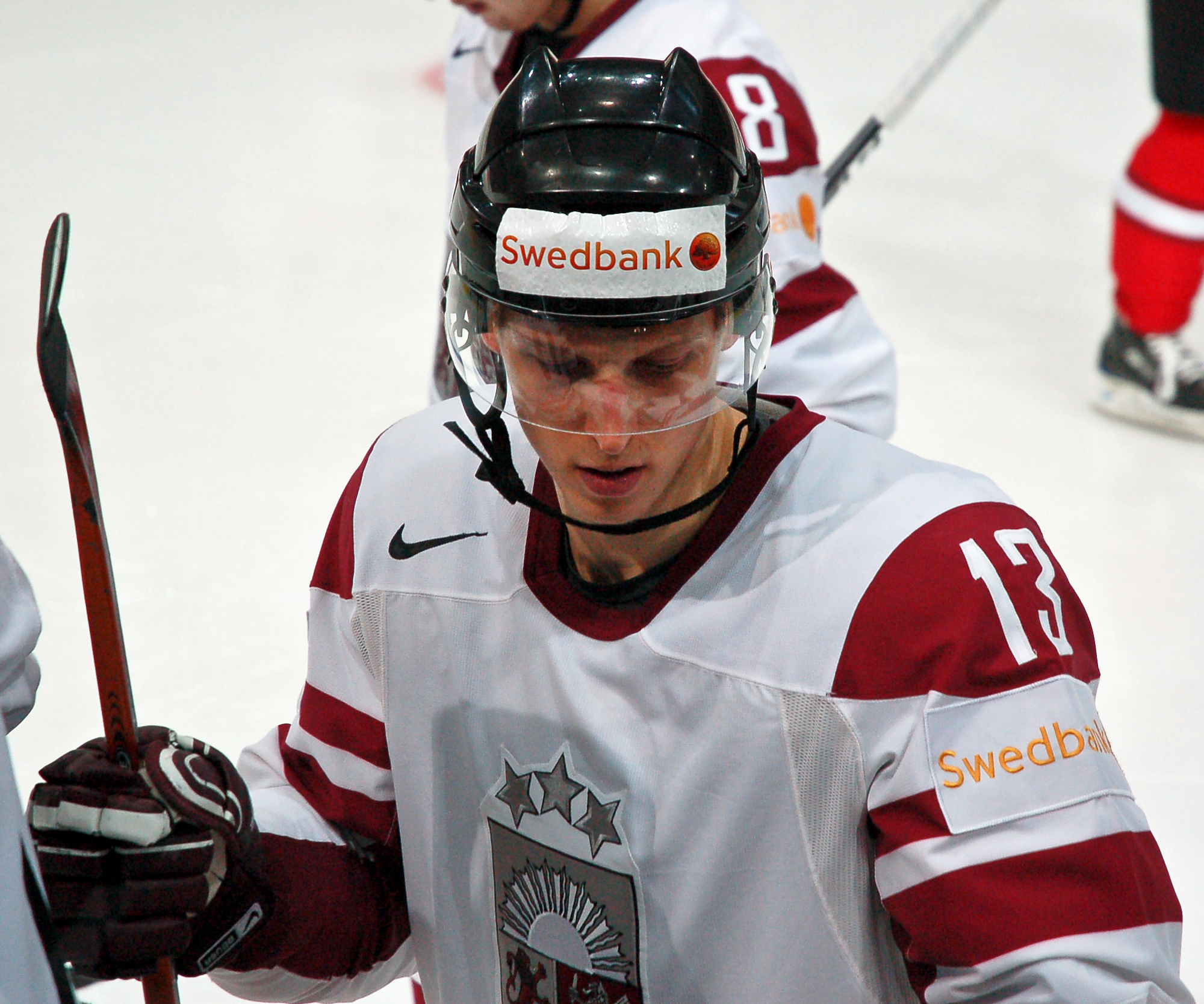
Defenceman Guntis Galviņš appeared in all six games for Latvia, recording a goal and two assists.

Number	Position	Player	Club	GP	G	A	Pts	PIM
21	F	Armands Bērziņš	HK Riga 2000	6	1	2	3	10
29	F	Mārtiņš Cipulis	HK Poprad	6	1	4	5	2
10	F	Lauris Dārziņš	HC Vsetín	6	3	2	5	2
20	F	Kaspars Daugaviņš	Toronto St. Michael's Majors	6	3	3	6	0
28	F	Guntis Džeriņš	SK Riga 20	1	0	0	0	0
7	D	Guntis Galviņš	HK Riga 2000	6	1	2	3	8
15	D	Aleksandrs Jerofejevs	HK Poprad	5	0	3	3	6
2	D	Rodrigo Laviņš	Brynäs IF Gävle	6	1	3	4	27
26	F	Aleksandrs Macijevskis	Odense Bulldogs	6	0	1	1	10
17	F	Aleksandrs Ņiživijs	Torpedo Nizhni Novgorod	6	1	0	1	0
13	F	Grigorijs Panteļejevs	SG Pontebba	6	0	2	2	4
18	D	Georgijs Pujacs	Khimik Moscow Oblast	5	0	0	0	4
24	F	Miķelis Rēdlihs	Junost Minsk	6	1	3	4	0
3	D	Arvīds Reķis	Augsburger Panther	4	0	0	0	2
4	D	Agris Saviels	HKm Zvolen	6	1	0	1	2
27	F	Aleksandrs Semjonovs	Traktor Chelyabinsk	6	1	1	2	6
16	F	Aleksejs Širokovs	Khimik Moscow Oblast	5	1	0	1	2
22	D	Oļegs Sorokins	Södertälje SK	6	2	4	6	6
5	F	Jānis Sprukts	Florida Panthers	3	0	2	2	0
14	F	Leonīds Tambijevs	HC Merano	5	1	1	2	6
23	D	Atvars Tribuncovs	Färjestad BK Karlstad	6	0	0	0	6
12	F	Herberts Vasiļjevs	Krefeld Pinguine	6	2	3	5	8

=== Goaltenders ===
Number	Player	Club	GP	W	L	Min	GA	GAA	SV%	SO
31	Edgars Masaļskis	Neftyanik Almetyevsk	4	2	2	220	12	3.27	0.891	1
30	Sergejs Naumovs	HC Bolzano Foxes	3	0	3	143	10	4.18	0.828	0
1	Mārtiņš Raitums	HK Riga 2000	0	0	0	0	0	0	0	0

== Norway ==
=== Skaters ===
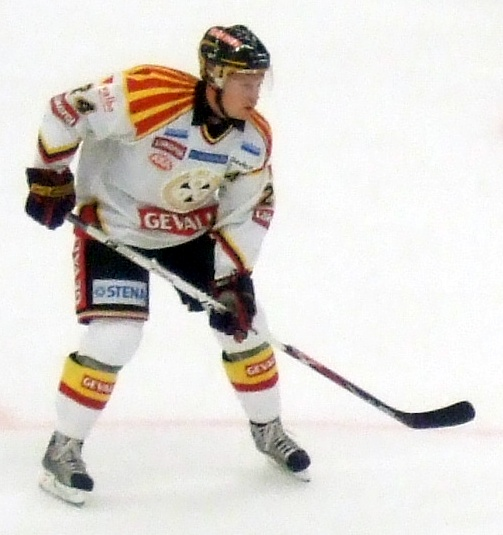
Mads Hansen had four points in six games for Norway.

Number	Position	Player	Club	GP	G	A	Pts	PIM
24	F	Jonas Andersen	IHK Sparta Sarpsborg	6	2	1	3	4
21	F	Morten Ask	Djurgårdens IF Stockholm	6	3	4	7	10
20	F	Anders Bastiansen	Mora IK	6	4	1	5	4
29	F	Kristian Forsberg	Storhamar IL Hamar	6	0	0	0	0
8	F	Mads Hansen	Brynäs IF Gävle	6	2	2	4	6
6	D	Jonas Holøs	IHK Sparta Sarpsborg	6	0	1	1	6
7	D	Tommy Jakobsen	Graz 99ers	6	0	2	2	8
4	D	Mattias Livf	Storhamar IL Hamar	6	0	1	1	6
36	D	Lars Erik Lund	Vålerenga Oslo	6	1	4	5	4
35	F	Aleksander Nervik	Vålerenga Oslo	6	0	0	0	4
28	F	Kjell Richard Nygård	Vålerenga Oslo	6	0	0	0	0
46	F	Mathis Olimb	Vålerenga Oslo	6	0	3	3	8
3	D	Cato Ørbæk	Storhamar IL Hamar	4	0	0	0	0
16	D	Erik Ryman	HC Alleghe	6	0	0	0	8
12	F	Knut Spets	IK Nyköping	6	0	0	0	2
10	F	Lars Erik Spets	Brynäs IF Gävle	6	2	1	3	4
41	F	Patrick Thoresen	Edmonton Oilers	6	1	4	5	2
25	F	Steffen Thoresen	Storhamar IL Hamar	6	0	0	0	0
14	F	Marius Trygg	Stavanger IK	6	0	2	2	2
23	D	Mats Trygg	Kölner Haie	6	2	5	7	8

=== Goaltenders ===
Number	Player	Club	GP	W	L	Min	GA	GAA	SV%	SO
33	Pål Grotnes	IK Comet Halden	6	2	4	359	21	3.51	0.886	0
39	Mathias Gundersen	Stavanger IK	0	0	0	0	0	0	0	0
1	Halvor Hårstad-Evjen	Frisk Tigers	0	0	0	0	0	0	0	0

== Russia ==
=== Skaters ===
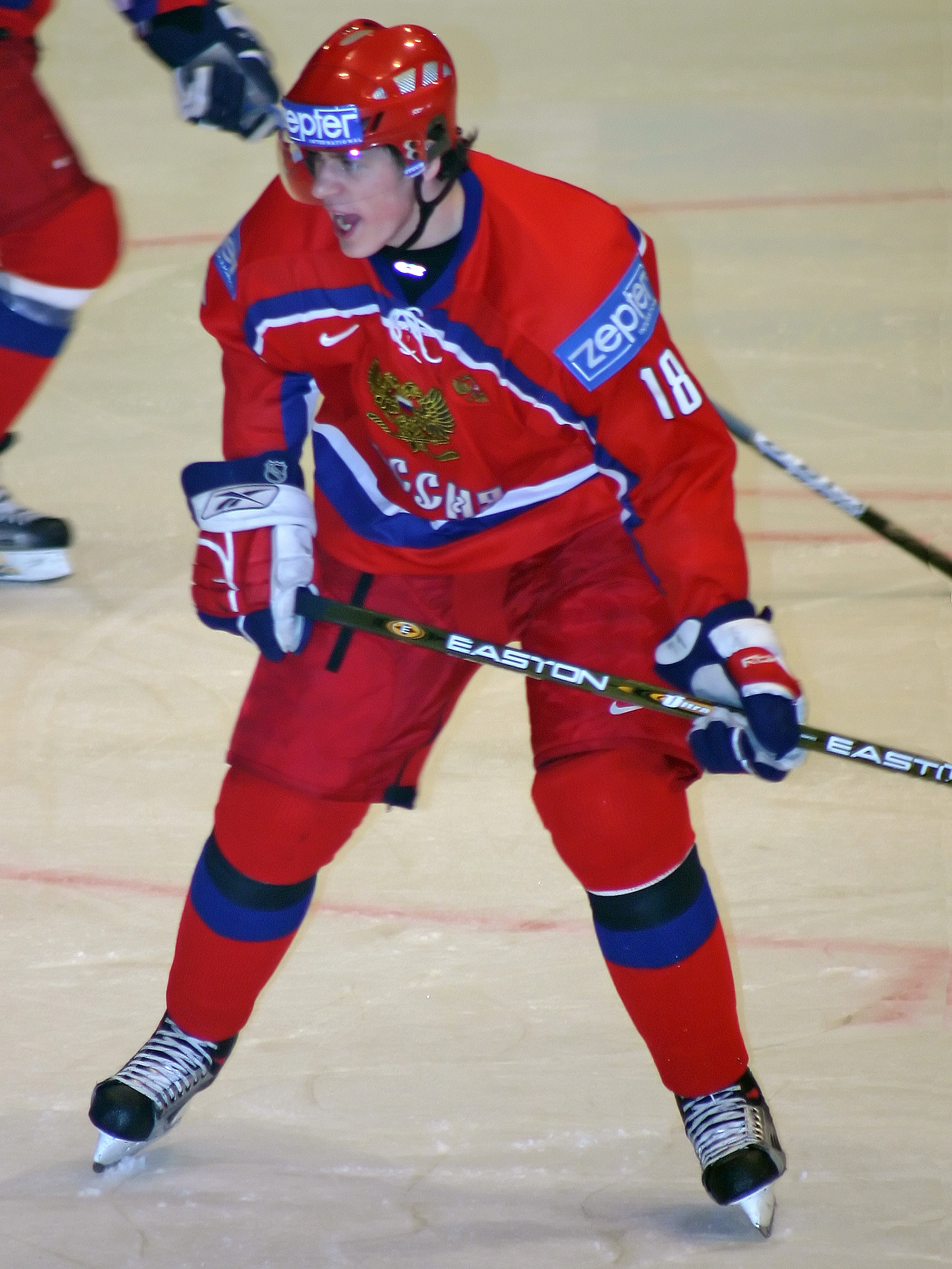
Evgeni Malkin played nine games, recording five goals and ten points, finishing fifth amongst his team in scoring.

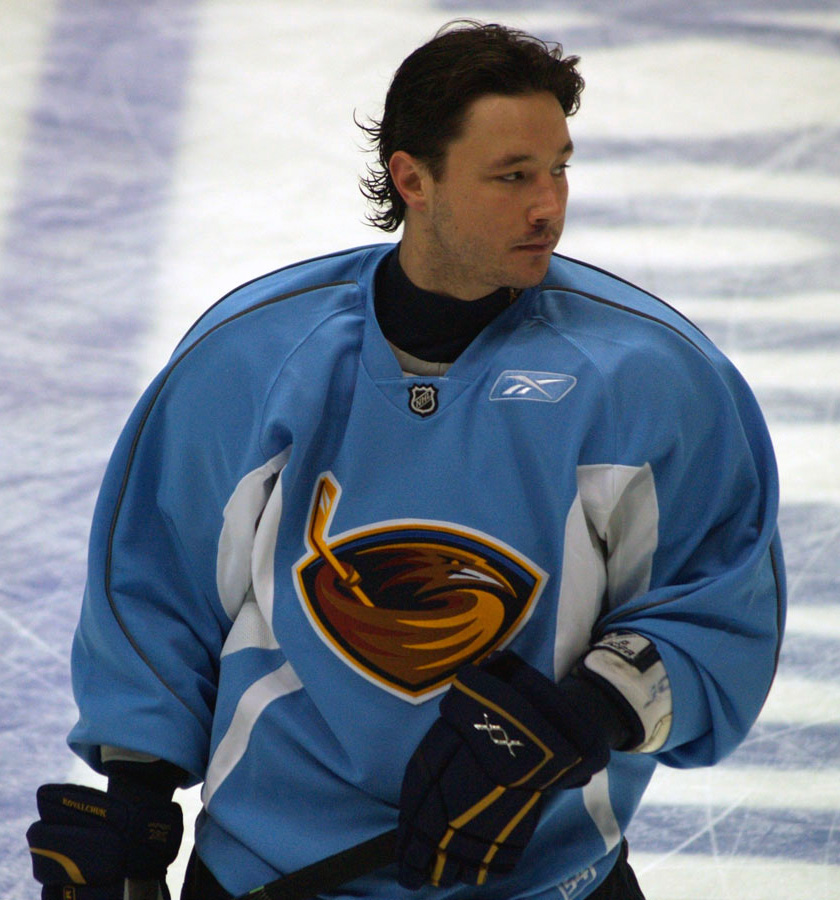
Ilya Kovalchuk recorded seven points in nine games.

Number	Position	Player	Club	GP	G	A	Pts	PIM
27	D	Vitali Atyushov	Metallurg Magnitogorsk	9	0	3	3	4
18	F	Sergei Brylin	New Jersey Devils	2	0	0	0	0
3	D	Alexei Emelin	Lada Togliatti	9	1	2	3	6
24	F	Alexander Frolov	Los Angeles Kings	9	5	6	11	0
55	D	Sergei Gonchar	Pittsburgh Penguins	9	1	4	5	4
7	D	Denis Grebeshkov	Lokomotiv Yaroslavl	9	1	2	3	0
21	F	Alexander Kharitonov	Dynamo Moscow	9	0	2	2	6
6	D	Maxim Kondratiev	Lada Togliatti	9	0	0	0	2
2	D	Konstantin Korneyev	CSKA Moscow	1	0	0	0	0
71	F	Ilya Kovalchuk	Atlanta Thrashers	9	2	5	7	10
15	F	Nikolai Kulemin	Metallurg Magnitogorsk	9	2	1	3	0
11	F	Evgeni Malkin	Pittsburgh Penguins	9	5	5	10	6
52	D	Andrei Markov	Montreal Canadiens	8	3	5	8	2
95	F	Aleksey Morozov	Ak Bars Kazan	7	8	5	13	6
13	F	Ivan Neprayev	Lokomotiv Yaroslavl	9	0	3	3	12
5	D	Ilya Nikulin	Ak Bars Kazan	9	2	0	2	4
8	F	Alexander Ovechkin	Washington Capitals	8	1	2	3	29
45	D	Vitali Proshkin	Ak Bars Kazan	9	1	1	2	16
22	F	Alexander Radulov	Nashville Predators	9	2	0	2	6
25	F	Petr Schastlivy	Khimik Moscow Oblast	8	3	1	4	2
12	F	Danis Zaripov	Ak Bars Kazan	9	3	9	12	6
42	F	Sergei Zinovjev	Ak Bars Kazan	9	3	10	13	12

=== Goaltenders ===
Number	Player	Club	GP	W	L	Min	GA	GAA	SV%	SO
57	Konstantin Barulin	Khimik Moscow Oblast	0	0	0	0	0	0	0	0
30	Alexander Eremenko	Ak Bars Kazan	6	5	1	367	6	0.98	0.957	2
83	Vasiliy Koshechkin	Lada Togliatti	3	3	0	180	8	2.67	0.879	0

== Slovakia ==
=== Skaters ===
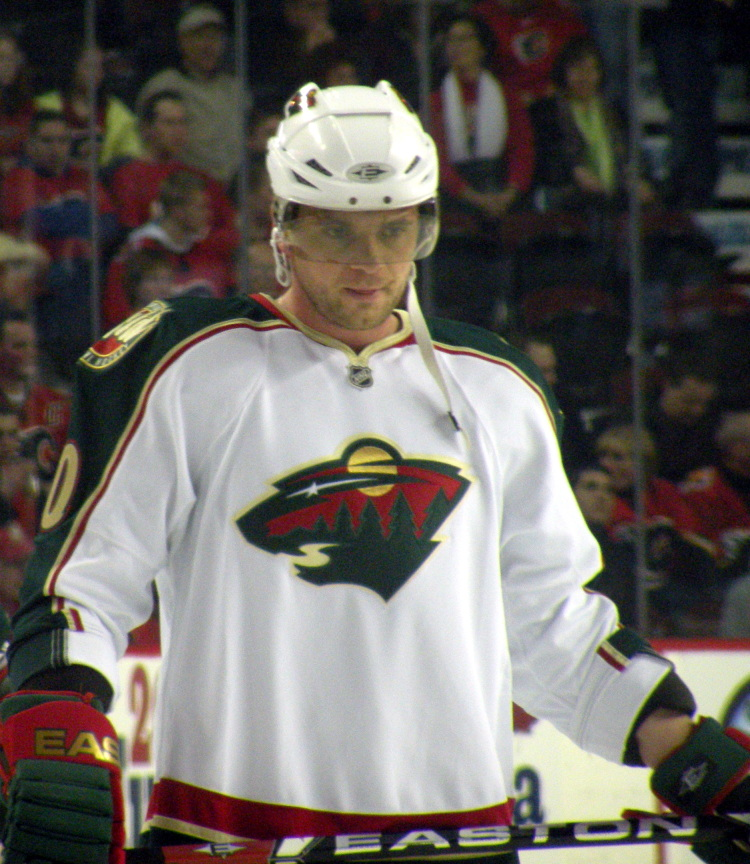
Marián Gáborík recorded five goals and six assists, and led his team in scoring.

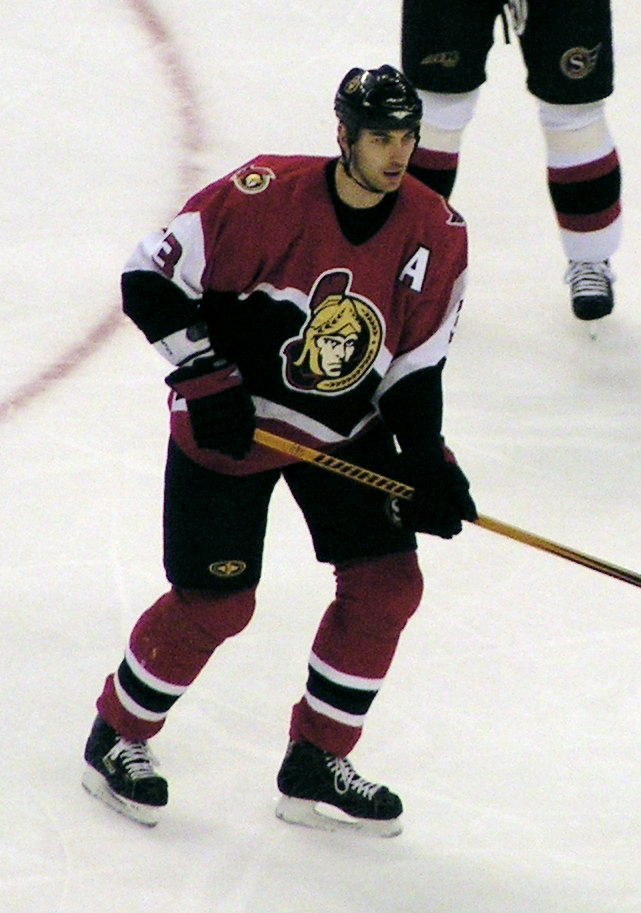
Defenceman Zdeno Chára scored three goals in seven games.

Number	Position	Player	Club	GP	G	A	Pts	PIM
3	D	Zdeno Chára	Boston Bruins	7	3	1	4	4
28	F	Ivan Čiernik	Kölner Haie	5	0	0	0	0
38	F	Pavol Demitra	Minnesota Wild	6	2	2	4	12
10	F	Marián Gáborík	Minnesota Wild	6	5	6	11	14
15	D	Dominik Graňák	HC Slavia Praha	1	0	0	0	0
71	F	Tomáš Harant	Lowell Devils	7	0	0	0	0
81	F	Marián Hossa	Atlanta Thrashers	6	2	4	6	6
68	D	Milan Jurčina	Washington Capitals	7	1	1	2	8
22	F	Richard Kapuš	Metallurg Novokuznetsk	7	3	5	8	2
47	F	Miroslav Kováčik	Sibir Novosibirsk	7	0	1	1	0
16	F	Roman Kukumberg	HC Slovan Bratislava	7	1	1	2	8
26	F	Tibor Melichárek	HC Dukla Trenčín	7	0	0	0	0
37	D	Peter Podhradský	Frankfurt Lions	7	2	5	7	6
14	F	Andrej Podkonický	HC Bílí Tygři Liberec	4	0	0	0	2
19	F	Branko Radivojevič	Minnesota Wild	7	2	1	3	6
18	F	Miroslav Šatan	New York Islanders	7	1	7	8	4
21	F	Radovan Somík	Severstal Cherepovets	6	1	1	2	2
55	D	Tomáš Starosta	Neftekhimik Nizhnekamsk	6	0	0	0	2
75	D	Richard Stehlík	HC Sparta Praha	6	0	1	1	2
7	D	Martin Štrbák	CSKA Moscow	7	0	1	1	2
43	F	Tomáš Surový	Luleå HF	7	0	1	1	4
79	F	Marek Uram	HC Slovan Bratislava	7	2	3	5	2

=== Goaltenders ===
Number	Player	Club	GP	W	L	Min	GA	GAA	SV%	SO
41	Jaroslav Halák	Montreal Canadiens	2	1	1	119	5	2.52	0.904	1
2	Branislav Konrád	HK Dynamax Nitra	0	0	0	0	0	0	0	0
60	Karol Križan	MODO Ornskoldsvik	5	3	2	298	16	3.22	0.884	0

== Sweden ==
=== Skaters ===
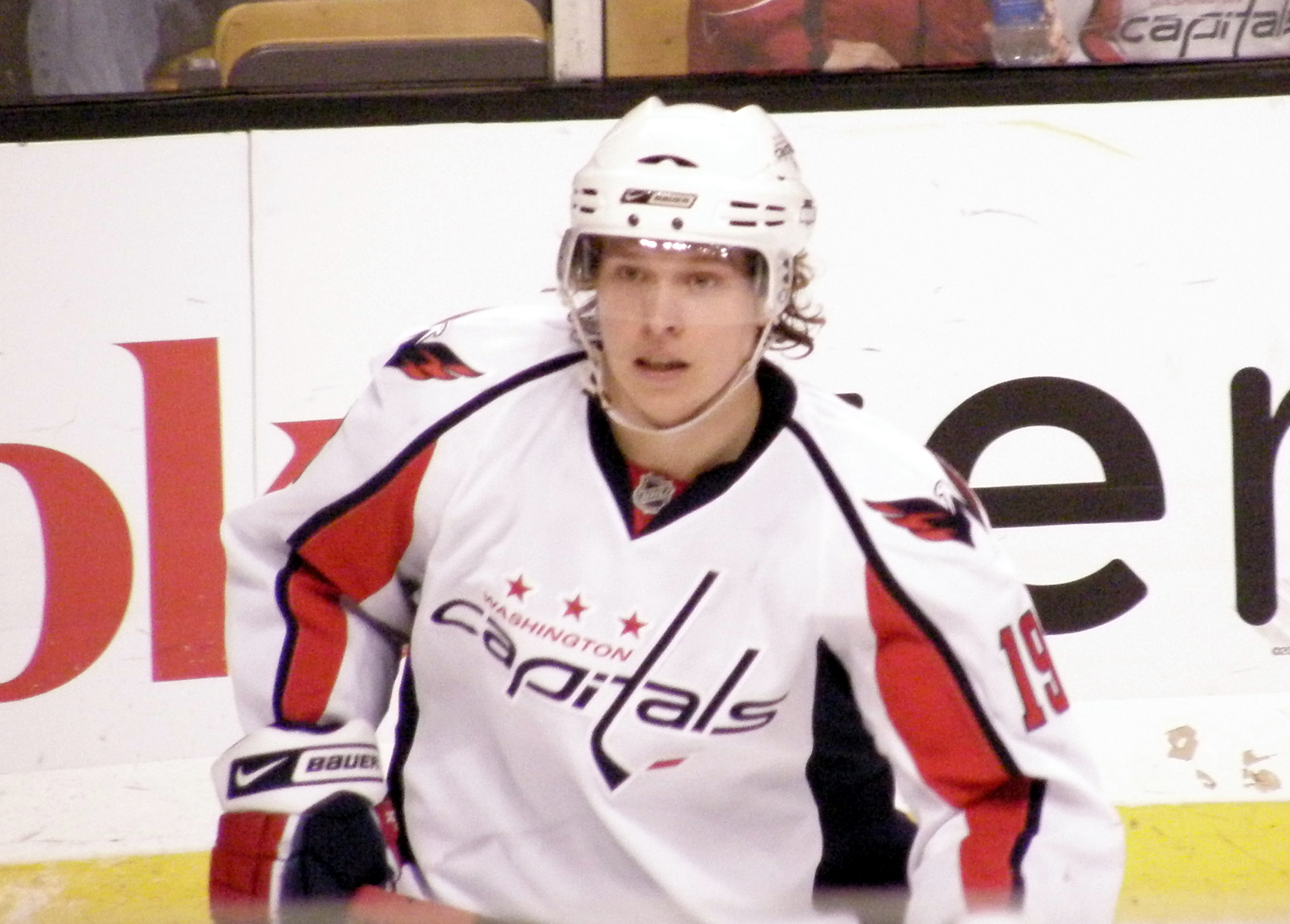
Nicklas Bäckström scored six points in nine games.

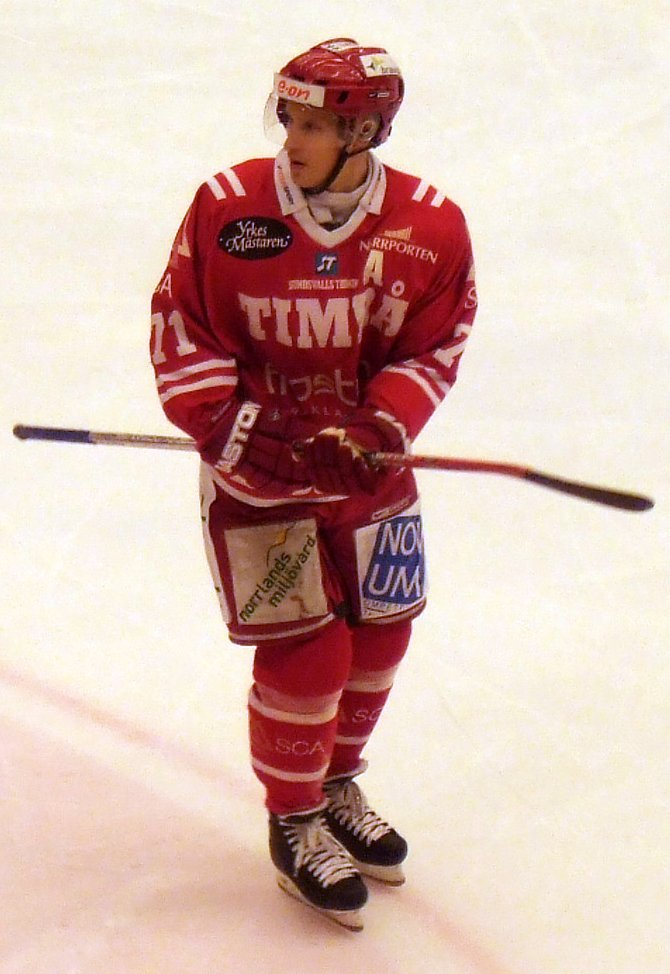
Jonathan Hedström led the Swedish team in penalties with 18 PIM.

Number	Position	Player	Club	GP	G	A	Pts	PIM
44	D	Johan Åkerman	HV 71	9	3	3	6	4
19	F	Nicklas Bäckström	Brynäs IF	9	1	5	6	4
23	F	Fredrik Bremberg	Djurgårdens IF	8	2	4	6	8
76	F	Johan Davidsson	HV71	9	7	7	14	2
33	F	Fredrik Emvall	Linköpings HC	9	1	2	3	2
2	D	Tobias Enström	Modo	9	0	2	2	10
18	D	Per Hållberg	EV Zug	9	1	4	5	8
17	F	Jonathan Hedström	Timrå IK	8	3	2	5	18
8	F	Patric Hörnqvist	Djurgårdens IF	9	2	4	6	6
6	D	Magnus Johansson	Linköpings HC	8	3	0	3	2
72	F	Jörgen Jönsson	Färjestad BK	9	0	8	8	6
29	D	Kenny Jönsson	Rögle BK	7	1	0	1	4
11	F	Magnus Kahnberg	Frölunda HC	2	0	0	0	2
14	F	Mathias Månsson	Brynäs IF	4	0	0	0	2
9	F	Tony Mårtensson	Linköpings HC	9	4	7	11	8
7	D	Jan Sandstrom	Luleå HF	3	0	0	0	2
10	F	Alexander Steen	Toronto Maple Leafs	9	2	2	4	6
4	D	Anton Strålman	Timrå IK	9	1	1	2	0
28	D	Dick Tärnström	HC Lugano	9	1	8	9	14
20	F	Martin Thörnberg	HV71	7	2	1	3	6
15	F	Rickard Wallin	HC Lugano	9	2	0	2	6
79	F	Fredrik Warg	Timrå IK	7	2	3	5	4

=== Goaltenders ===
Number	Player	Club	GP	W	L	Min	GA	GAA	SV%	SO
31	Johan Backlund	Timrå IK	6	4	2	359	12	2.01	0.907	2
30	Erik Ersberg	HV71	1	0	1	59	4	4.06	0.871	0
34	Daniel Henriksson	Färjestad BK	2	2	0	120	4	2.00	0.892	0

== Switzerland ==
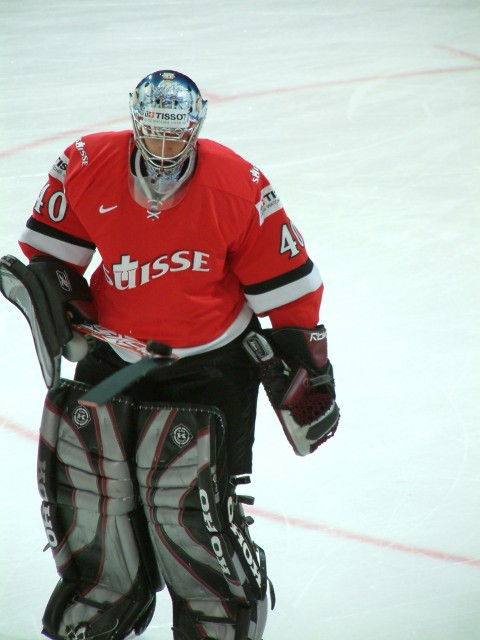
Goaltender David Aebischer played one game for the Swiss team.

=== Skaters ===
Number	Position	Player	Club	GP	G	A	Pts	PIM
10	F	Andres Ambühl	HC Davos	7	0	0	0	12
57	D	Goran Bezina	Genève-Servette HC	7	1	1	2	6
5	D	Severin Blindenbacher	ZSC Lions	7	0	1	1	2
24	F	Duri Camichel	EV Zug	7	0	1	1	0
12	F	Patric Della Rossa	EHC Basel	7	0	0	0	6
15	F	Paul DiPietro	EV Zug	7	3	2	5	2
29	D	Beat Forster	ZSC Lions	7	0	0	0	4
2	D	Beat Gerber	SC Bern	7	0	0	0	8
33	D	Steve Hirschi	HC Lugano	3	0	0	0	2
35	F	Sandy Jeannin	HC Lugano	7	1	1	2	4
67	F	Romano Lemm	Kloten Flyers	7	0	4	4	6
25	F	Thibaut Monnet	HC Fribourg-Gottéron	7	1	1	2	0
23	F	Thierry Paterlini	ZSC Lions	4	0	0	0	0
36	F	Marc Reichert	SC Bern	7	1	2	3	6
32	F	Ivo Rüthemann	SC Bern	7	1	0	1	2
39	F	Raffaele Sannitz	HC Lugano	2	0	0	0	0
86	F	Julien Sprunger	HC Fribourg-Gottéron	7	2	0	2	4
11	D	Martin Steinegger	SC Bern	4	0	0	0	6
7	D	Mark Streit	Montreal Canadiens	7	1	3	4	6
3	D	Julien Vauclair	HC Lugano	7	0	0	0	4
97	F	Adrian Wichser	ZSC Lions	7	1	3	4	2
27	F	Valentin Wirz	HC Lugano	7	0	0	0	0

=== Goaltenders ===
Number	Player	Club	GP	W	L	Min	GA	GAA	SV%	SO
40	David Aebischer	Montreal Canadiens	1	0	1	60	6	6.00	0.793	0
1	Jonas Hiller	HC Davos	6	3	3	359	15	2.51	0.910	0
79	Daniel Manzato	EHC Basel	0	0	0	0	0	0	0	0

== Ukraine ==
=== Skaters ===
Number	Position	Player	Club	GP	G	A	Pts	PIM
5	D	Oleg Blagoi	Sokil Kyiv	3	1	0	1	0
8	F	Oleksandr Bobkin	Sokil Kyiv	3	1	1	2	0
7	F	Vasyl Bobrovnikov	Sokil Kyiv	6	0	1	1	0
21	F	Vitaliy Donika	Neftyanik Almetyevsk	4	0	0	0	0
24	F	Artem Gnidenko	HK Vitebsk	6	0	0	0	6
2	D	Iurii Gunko	Sokil Kyiv	6	0	0	0	6
4	D	Denys Isayenko	HK Gomel	5	0	1	1	2
11	F	Sergiy Kharchenko	Hull Stingrays	6	0	0	0	2
3	D	Serhiy Klymentiev	HC MVD Moscow Oblast	6	1	1	2	46
44	D	Vitaliy Lyutkevych	Keramin Minsk	6	1	2	3	2
28	F	Oleksandr Materukhin	Khimvolokno Mogilev	6	1	0	1	8
17	F	Oleksandr Matviichuk	Sokil Kyiv	6	1	2	3	4
32	D	Yuriy Navarenko	HK Vitebsk	6	1	2	3	4
29	F	Valentyn Oletskyy	HK Gomel	6	0	2	2	2
9	D	Oleksandr Pobiedonostsev	Khimvolokno Mogilev	5	0	0	0	6
23	F	Roman Salnikov	Keramin Minsk	6	2	1	3	0
18	F	Vitaliy Semenchenko	Yunost Minsk	6	0	0	0	4
77	F	Oleg Shafarenko	Keramin Minsk	5	0	2	2	6
6	D	Andriy Sryubko	HC Dmitrov	6	0	0	0	6
12	D	Viacheslav Timchenko	HK Gomel	5	0	0	0	2
55	F	Dmytro Tsyrul	HC MVD Moscow Oblast	6	2	2	4	12
30	D	Vyacheslav Zavalnyuk	Metallurg Magnitogorsk	6	0	3	3	35

=== Goaltenders ===
Number	Player	Club	GP	W	L	Min	GA	GAA	SV%	SO
1	Oleksandr Fedorov	Khimvolokno Mogilev	3	0	3	85	13	9.18	0.768	0
50	Igor Karpenko	Keramin Minsk	1	0	1	60	5	5	0.872	0
22	Vadym Seliverstov	HC Berkut-Kyiv	5	1	4	215	14	3.91	0.865	0

== United States ==
=== Skaters ===
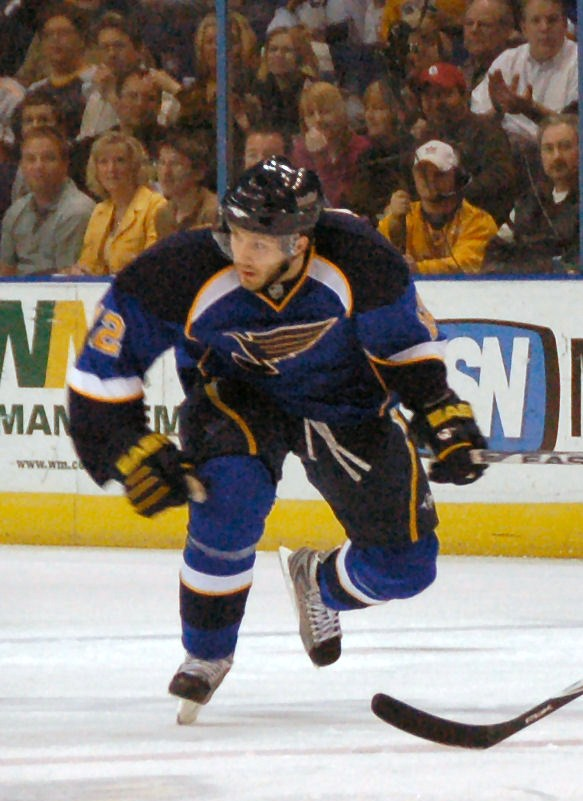
Lee Stempniak led the American team in scoring with six goals and four assists.

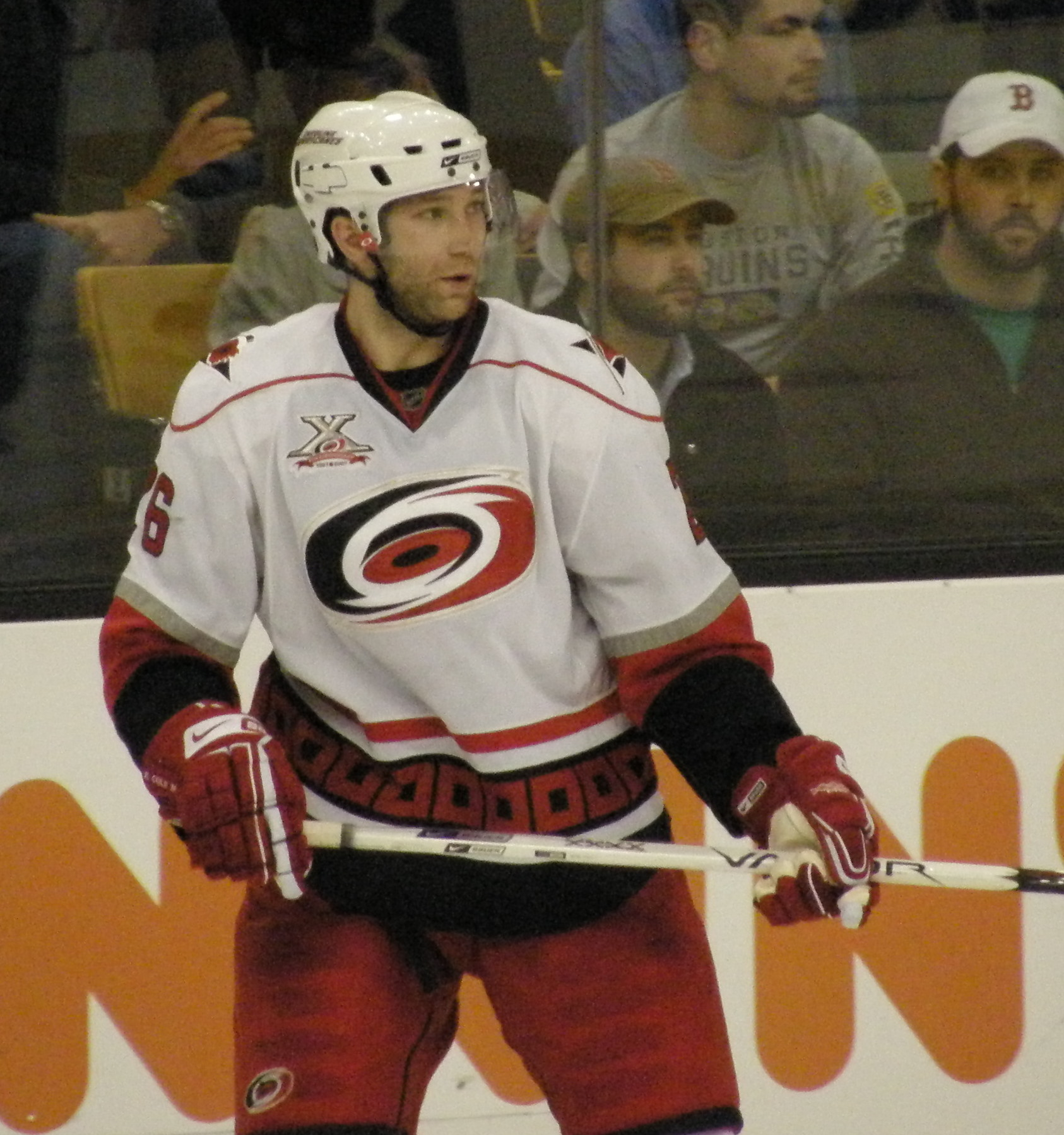
Erik Cole scored five points in seven games.

Number	Position	Player	Club	GP	G	A	Pts	PIM
41	D	Andrew Alberts	Boston Bruins	7	0	1	1	14
39	F	Tyler Arnason	Colorado Avalanche	7	1	3	4	0
18	F	David Backes	St. Louis Blues	7	1	2	3	6
44	D	Keith Ballard	Phoenix Coyotes	7	0	3	3	16
10	F	Brandon Bochenski	Boston Bruins	7	2	3	5	6
43	F	Ryan Callahan	New York Rangers	0	0	0	0	0
17	F	Chris Clark	Washington Capitals	6	2	1	3	4
26	F	Erik Cole	Carolina Hurricanes	7	1	4	5	2
16	F	Nathan Davis	Miami University	7	0	0	0	2
5	D	Matt Greene	Edmonton Oilers	7	0	2	2	6
28	F	Adam Hall	Minnesota Wild	7	0	1	1	2
24	D	Andrew Hutchinson	Carolina Hurricanes	7	3	1	4	2
6	D	Erik Johnson	University of Minnesota	7	0	2	2	4
3	D	Jack Johnson	Los Angeles Kings	7	1	0	1	0
8	F	Phil Kessel	Boston Bruins	7	2	5	7	6
59	F	Chad LaRose	Carolina Hurricanes	7	2	1	3	2
9	F	Zach Parise	New Jersey Devils	1	0	0	0	0
20	F	Toby Petersen	Edmonton Oilers	7	2	1	3	4
2	D	Brian Pothier	Washington Capitals	7	0	1	1	4
11	F	Paul Stastny	Colorado Avalanche	7	4	4	8	2
12	F	Lee Stempniak	St. Louis Blues	7	6	4	10	27
7	D	Ryan Suter	Nashville Predators	7	1	2	3	12

=== Goaltenders ===
Number	Player	Club	GP	W	L	Min	GA	GAA	SV%	SO
33	Jason Bacashihua	St. Louis Blues	1	0	1	20	1	3.00	0.889	0
47	John Grahame	Carolina Hurricanes	7	4	3	409	19	2.79	0.892	1
1	Cory Schneider	Boston College	0	0	0	0	0	0	0	0
