= Aleksejs Širokovs =

Latvian ice hockey player

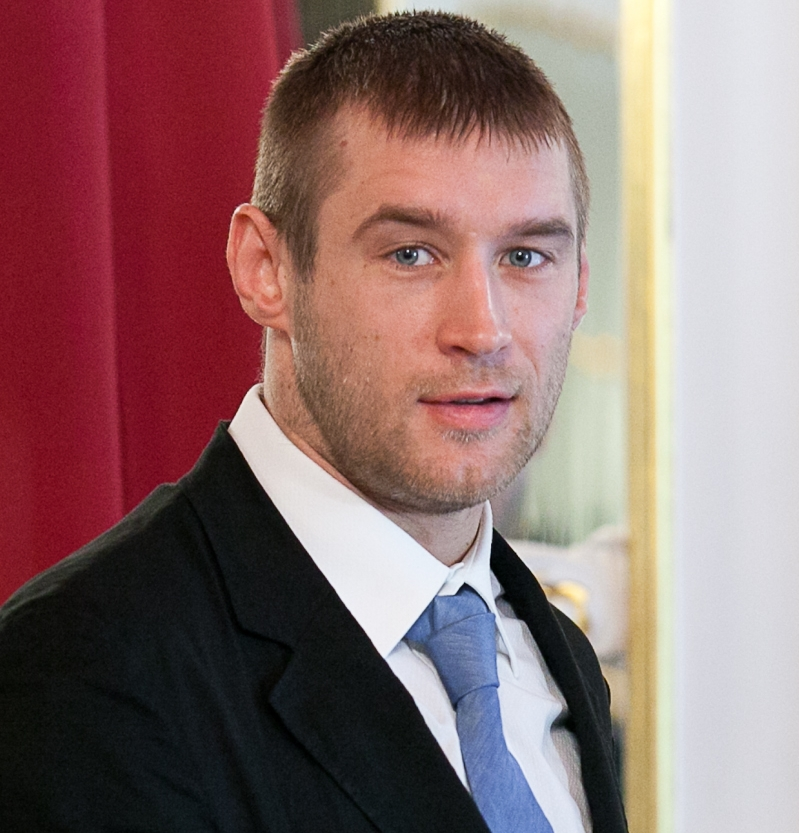
- Born: February 20, 1981 (age 45) Riga, Latvian SSR, Soviet Union
- Height: 6 ft 0 in (183 cm)
- Weight: 190 lb (86 kg; 13 st 8 lb)
- Position: Centre
- Shoots: Right
- DEL2 team Former teams: Dresdner Eislöwen; HC Kometa Brno; Lukko Rauma; Amur Khabarovsk; HK Riga 2000; HK Liepājas Metalurgs; SG Cortina; Amur Khabarovsk; Kapitan Stupino; HC Dynamo Moscow; Metallurg Novokuznetsk; HC Atlant Moscow Oblast; Metallurg Zhlobin; Dinamo Riga; Kazzinc-Torpedo; Martigny Red Ice
- National team: Latvia
- Playing career: 1996–present

Aleksejs Širokovs (born 20 February 1981) is a Latvian professional ice hockey player currently playing for Dresdner Eislöwen of the DEL2. Most of his professional playing career Širokovs spent in Latvian Hockey League's club HK Liepājas Metalurgs, twice becoming Latvia's champion. From 2004 until 2007 Širokovs played in several Russian Superleague and Russian Major League clubs, but played the 2007-08 season in Belarusian Extraliga club Metallurg Zhlobin.

He played in Latvian national ice hockey team during seven World Championships. He also played in Olympics qualifying tournament, as well as three Junior World Championships.

== Career statistics ==
=== Regular season and playoffs ===
			Regular season					Playoffs
Season	Team	League	GP	G	A	Pts	PIM	GP	G	A	Pts	PIM
1996–97	Pārdaugava Rīga	LAT	19	11	14	25	14	—	—	—	—	—
1997–98	HK Rīga	EEHL	2	0	0	0	0	—	—	—	—	—
1998–99	HK Liepājas Metalurgs	EEHL
1999–2000	Dinamo 81 Rīga	LAT	15	13	16	29	10	—	—	—	—	—
1999–2000	Dinamo 81 Rīga	EEHL B	14	11	5	16	14	—	—	—	—	—
2000–01	HK Liepājas Metalurgs	LAT	17	3	5	8		—	—	—	—	—
2000–01	HK Liepājas Metalurgs	EEHL	26	7	5	12		—	—	—	—	—
2001–02	HK Liepājas Metalurgs	LAT	14	10	4	14	8	2	1	3	4	0
2001–02	HK Liepājas Metalurgs	EEHL	39	16	11	27	24	—	—	—	—	—
2002–03	HK Liepājas Metalurgs	LAT		6	13	19	18	—	—	—	—	—
2002–03	HK Liepājas Metalurgs	EEHL	36	9	9	18	61	—	—	—	—	—
2003–04	HK Liepājas Metalurgs	LAT	2	1	0	1	0	—	—	—	—	—
2003–04	HK Liepājas Metalurgs	EEHL	4	1	2	3	4	—	—	—	—	—
2003–04	SG Cortina	ITA	41	18	19	37	32	7	2	3	5	2
2004–05	Amur Khabarovsk	RUS.2	40	11	9	20	26	13	1	4	5	18
2004–05	Amur–2 Khabarovsk	RUS.3	1	0	0	0	0	—	—	—	—	—
2005–06	Kapitan Stupino	RUS.2	18	1	7	8	20	—	—	—	—	—
2005–06	Dynamo Moscow	RSL	2	0	0	0	10	—	—	—	—	—
2005–06	Metallurg Novokuznetsk	RSL	19	7	7	14	22	3	1	1	2	2
2005–06	Metallurg–2 Novokuznetsk	RUS.3	1	1	0	1	0	—	—	—	—	—
2006–07	Metallurg Novokuznetsk	RSL	28	4	1	5	30	—	—	—	—	—
2006–07	Metallurg–2 Novokuznetsk	RUS.3	1	0	0	0	0	—	—	—	—	—
2006–07	Atlant Moscow Oblast	RSL	16	2	2	4	8	5	0	0	0	4
2007–08	Metallurg Zhlobin	BLR	54	15	29	44	60	5	4	0	4	4
2008–09	Dinamo Rīga	KHL	45	2	8	10	28	3	0	0	0	2
2009–10	Amur Khabarovsk	KHL	51	8	12	20	26	—	—	—	—	—
2010–11	Amur Khabarovsk	KHL	7	1	1	2	2	—	—	—	—	—
2010–11	HK Ozolnieki/Monarhs	LAT	6	4	6	10	8	—	—	—	—	—
2010–11	Lukko	SM-l	12	0	1	1	8	—	—	—	—	—
2010–11	HC Kometa Brno	ELH	13	3	2	5	8	—	—	—	—	—
2011–12	Kazzinc–Torpedo	VHL	52	11	16	27	85	5	0	1	1	4
2012–13	HC Red Ice	SUI.2	38	11	11	22	57	6	4	2	6	4
2013–14	HC Red Ice	SUI.2	45	17	21	38	54	4	0	1	1	4
2014–15	HK Prizma Rīga	LAT	1	1	1	2	2	—	—	—	—	—
2014–15	Neman Grodno	BLR	33	10	2	12	47	—	—	—	—	—
2014–15	Shakhtyor Soligorsk	BLR	4	0	0	0	27	—	—	—	—	—
2014–15	HK Kurbads	LAT	6	2	5	7	2	13	3	5	8	14
2015–16	Zvezda Moscow	VHL	36	3	15	18	24	—	—	—	—	—
2015–16	Neftyanik Almetyevsk	VHL	9	3	3	6	6	18	3	2	5	35
2016–17	Neftyanik Almetyevsk	VHL	42	2	5	7	24	4	0	1	1	4
2017–18	HK Mogo	LAT	29	7	19	26	10	6	0	4	4	16
2018–19	HK Prizma Rīga	LAT	32	7	20	27	34	—	—	—	—	—
2018–19	Dresdner Eislöwen	GER.2	1	1	0	1	4	12	5	3	8	18
2019–20	HK Olimp	LAT	32	7	16	23	67	—	—	—	—	—
2020–21	HK Olimp/Venta 2002	LAT	29	8	12	20	54	9	1	5	6	2
2021–22	HK Olimp/Venta 2002	LAT	28	13	17	30	18	10	1	0	1	8
LAT totals			230	87	135	222	227	40	6	17	23	40
EEHL totals			107	33	27	60	89	—	—	—	—	—
RSL & KHL totals			168	24	31	55	126	11	1	1	2	8

=== International ===
Year	Team	Event	GP	G	A	Pts	PIM
1997	Latvia	EJC C	4	1	2	3	0
1998	Latvia	EJC C	4	3	2	5	4
1999	Latvia	WJC B	5	1	0	1	4
1999	Latvia	EJC D1	4	4	4	8	0
2000	Latvia	WJC B	5	1	1	2	6
2001	Latvia	WJC D1	5	3	0	3	4
2003	Latvia	WC	6	1	0	1	2
2004	Latvia	WC	7	0	0	0	2
2005	Latvia	WC	6	0	1	1	4
2006	Latvia	WC	6	1	2	3	2
2007	Latvia	WC	5	1	0	1	2
2008	Latvia	WC	6	2	0	2	4
2009	Latvia	OGQ	3	0	0	0	6
2009	Latvia	WC	3	0	2	2	0
2010	Latvia	OG	4	0	0	0	2
2012	Latvia	WC	7	1	0	1	2
2013	Latvia	WC	7	0	0	0	2
2016	Latvia	WC	5	1	0	1	29
Junior totals			27	13	9	22	18
Senior totals			65	7	5	12	57
