= Vitali Donika =

Ukrainian ice hockey player

- Born: May 12, 1982 (age 42); Kiev, Ukrainian SSR, Soviet Union
- Height: 5 ft 10 in (178 cm)
- Weight: 203 lb (92 kg; 14 st 7 lb)
- Position: Forward
- Shot: Left
- Played for: HK Kryzynka Kyiv; Sokil Kyiv; HK Kyiv; Kristall Saratov; Neftyanik Almetyevsk; HC Sarov; HC Donbass; CSM Dunărea Galați; CS Progym Gheorgheni
- National team: Ukraine
- NHL draft: Undrafted
- Playing career: 2002–2019

Vitali Anatoliyovych Donika (Ukrainian: Віталій Анатолійович Доніка; born May 12, 1982) is a Ukrainian ice hockey player.

Donika competed at the 2006 and 2007 IIHF World Championships as a member of the Ukraine men's national ice hockey team.

== Career statistics ==
			Regular season					Playoffs
Season	Team	League	GP	G	A	Pts	PIM	GP	G	A	Pts	PIM
1997–98	Ldinka Kyiv	EEHL	3	0	1	1	4	—	—	—	—	—
1998–99	Ldinka Kyiv	EEHL	28	5	2	7	6	—	—	—	—	—
1999–00	Sokil Kyiv-2	EEHL B	14	7	5	12	14	—	—	—	—	—
1999–00	Ldinka Kyiv	EEHL	10	0	0	0	2	—	—	—	—	—
2000–01	Sokil Kyiv	EEHL	19	8	1	9	12	—	—	—	—	—
2000–01	HK Kyiv	EEHL	4	0	0	0	6	—	—	—	—	—
2001–02	HK Kyiv	EEHL B	6	0	4	4	0	—	—	—	—	—
2001–02	Sokil Kyiv	EEHL	22	2	5	7	0	—	—	—	—	—
2001–02	Sokil Kyiv	Ukraine	5	1	3	4	2	—	—	—	—	—
2002–03	Sokil Kyiv	EEHL	27	3	6	9	6	—	—	—	—	—
2002–03	Sokil Kyiv	Ukraine	—	—	—	—	—	2	2	0	2	0
2003–04	Sokil Kyiv	EEHL	16	7	0	7	8	—	—	—	—	—
2003–04	Kristall Saratov	Russia2	12	3	2	5	2	4	2	0	2	0
2004–05	Kristall Saratov	Russia2	20	5	7	12	2	—	—	—	—	—
2005–06	Neftyanik Almetyevsk	Russia2	51	12	16	28	67	8	0	1	1	2
2005–06	Neftyanik Almetyevsk-2	Russia3	3	2	3	5	0	—	—	—	—	—
2006–07	Neftyanik Almetyevsk	Russia2	21	2	0	2	8	1	0	0	0	2
2006–07	Neftyanik Almetyevsk-2	Russia3	9	6	3	9	4	—	—	—	—	—
2007–08	Sokil Kyiv	Russia2	34	6	8	14	12	3	1	0	1	0
2007–08	Sokil Kyiv-2	Ukraine	3	0	3	3	0	—	—	—	—	—
2008–09	Sokil Kyiv	Russia2	30	4	7	11	24	2	0	0	0	0
2008–09	Sokil Kyiv-2	Ukraine	6	1	6	7	10	3	0	0	0	0
2009–10	HC Sarov	Russia2	46	9	8	17	14	—	—	—	—	—
2010–11	HC Sarov	VHL	50	7	4	11	49	4	0	0	0	2
2011–12	Donbass Donetsk	VHL	41	9	9	18	16	10	0	0	0	2
2012–13	Donbass Donetsk	KHL	15	0	1	1	0	—	—	—	—	—
2012–13	Donbass Donetsk-2	Ukraine	14	3	5	8	0	—	—	—	—	—
2013–14	HC Sarov	VHL	24	5	5	10	2	—	—	—	—	—
2014–15	CSM Dunărea Galați	Romania	20	27	14	41	6	10	9	4	13	2
2015–16	CSM Dunărea Galați	Romania	26	13	17	30	2	5	6	0	6	4
2016–17	CSM Dunărea Galați	MOL Liga	17	9	9	18	—	—	—	—	—	—
2016–17	CSM Dunărea Galați	Romania	18	15	11	26	8	3	1	3	4	0
2018–19	Gyergyói HK	Romania	7	5	3	8	2	2	0	0	0	0
KHL totals			15	0	1	1	0	—	—	—	—	—
Russia2 totals			214	41	48	89	129	18	3	1	4	4
VHL totals			115	21	18	39	67	14	0	0	0	4
Ukraine totals			28	5	17	22	12	5	2	0	2	0
EEHL totals			129	25	15	40	44	—	—	—	—	—
Romania totals			71	60	45	105	18	20	16	7	23	6
