= Mārtiņš Cipulis =

Latvian ice hockey player (born 1980)

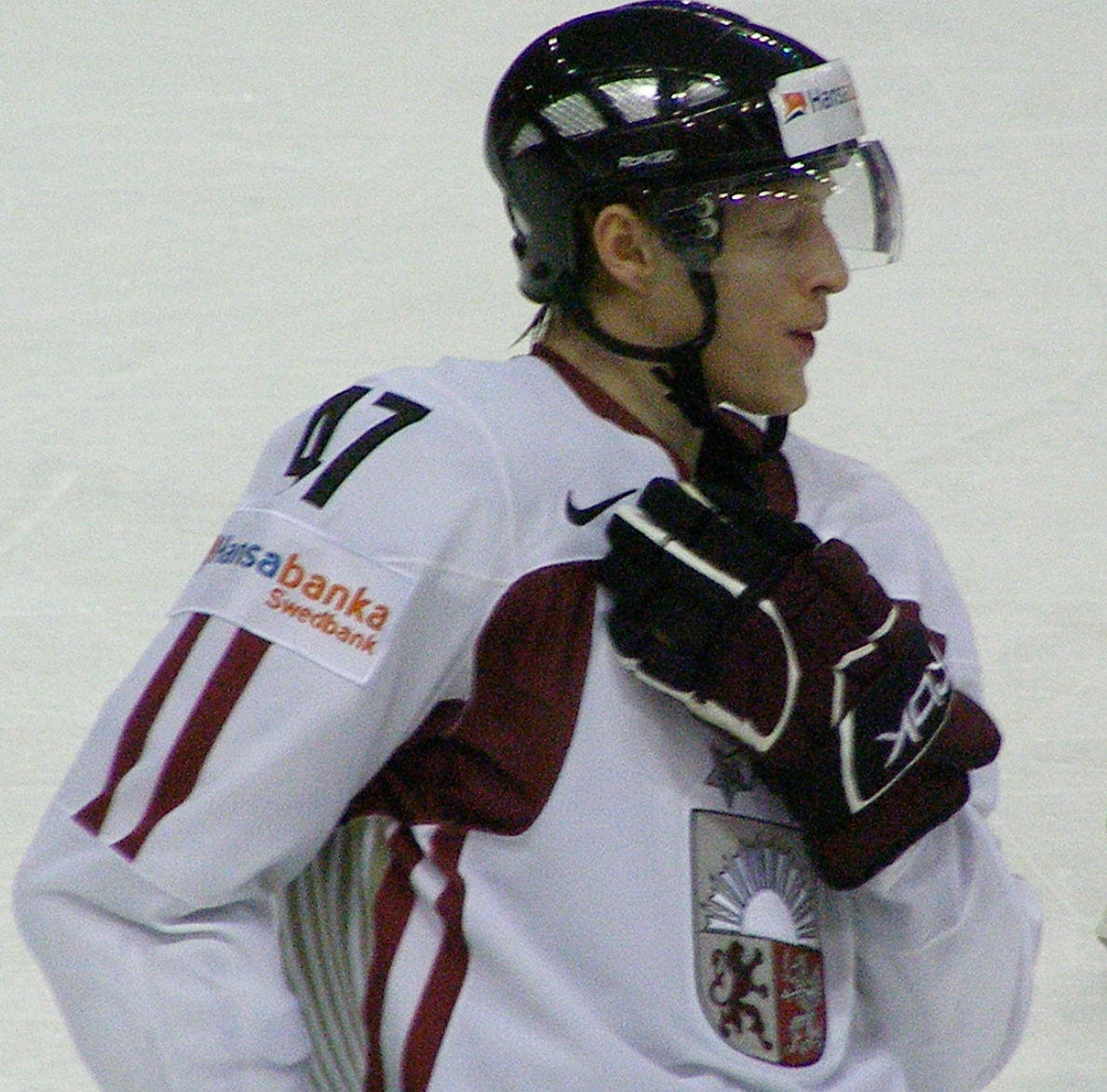
- Born: November 29, 1980 (age 44); Cēsis, Soviet Union
- Height: 5 ft 11 in (180 cm)
- Weight: 181 lb (82 kg; 12 st 13 lb)
- Position: Left wing
- Shot: Left
- KHL team Former teams: Dinamo Riga; HC Lev Praha; Amur Khabarovsk; Metallurg Zhlobin; HK Poprad; HK Riga 2000; HK Liepājas Metalurgs
- National team: Latvia
- Playing career: 1998–2020

Mārtiņš Cipulis (born November 29, 1980) is a Latvian ice hockey left winger currently playing for Dinamo Riga, in the Kontinental Hockey League.

== Awards ==
- 2003–04 LHL Best Forward
- LHL -HK Riga 2000 Champions 2003–04, 2004–05 and 2005–06

== Career statistics ==
=== Regular season and playoffs ===
			Regular season					Playoffs
Season	Team	League	GP	G	A	Pts	PIM	GP	G	A	Pts	PIM
1998–99	HK Liepājas Metalurgs	EEHL	31	2	5	7	8	—	—	—	—	—
1999–2000	HK Liepājas Metalurgs	EEHL	41	2	5	7	10	—	—	—	—	—
1999–2000	HK Liepājas Metalurgs	LAT	—	—	—	—	—	2	0	0	0	0
2000–01	HK Rīga 2000	EEHL	32	5	5	10		—	—	—	—	—
2000–01	HK Rīga 2000	LAT	21	13	4	17		—	—	—	—	—
2001–02	HK Rīga 2000	LAT	20	11	18	29	2	3	0	1	1	0
2001–02	HK Rīga 2000	EEHL	37	1	4	5	12	—	—	—	—	—
2001–02	LB Prizma Rīga	EEHL B	2	3	0	3	0	—	—	—	—	—
2002–03	HK Rīga 2000	EEHL	31	7	3	10	8	—	—	—	—	—
2002–03	HK Rīga 2000	LAT	15	8	10	18	12	4	0	0	0	2
2003–04	HK Rīga 2000	EEHL	32	5	6	11	8	—	—	—	—	—
2003–04	HK Rīga 2000	LAT	21	15	11	26	10	7	7	8	15	4
2004–05	HK Rīga 2000	BLR	44	15	8	23	26	3	1	0	1	0
2004–05	HK Rīga 2000	LAT	5	3	1	4	2	10	4	4	8	4
2005–06	HK Rīga 2000	BLR	47	12	16	28	14	6	4	1	5	4
2005–06	HK Rīga 2000	LAT		3	2	5	4	—	—	—	—	—
2006–07	HK Aquacity ŠKP Poprad	SVK	45	6	8	14	16	6	2	1	3	4
2007–08	Metallurg Zhlobin	BLR	54	23	22	45	34	5	0	2	2	4
2008–09	Dinamo Rīga	KHL	56	9	11	20	28	3	0	0	0	0
2009–10	Dinamo Rīga	KHL	56	8	7	15	22	9	2	0	2	2
2010–11	Amur Khabarovsk	KHL	42	12	7	19	14	—	—	—	—	—
2011–12	Dinamo Rīga	KHL	48	2	8	10	18	6	0	0	0	25
2012–13	Lev Praha	KHL	16	3	3	6	2	4	0	0	0	0
2013–14	Dinamo Rīga	KHL	40	5	4	9	6	6	0	0	0	0
2014–15	Dinamo Rīga	KHL	37	2	1	3	14	—	—	—	—	—
2015–16	MHC Martin	SVK	12	2	4	6	2	4	1	2	3	2
2016–17	EHC Lustenau	AlpsHL	18	6	2	8	29	4	1	0	1	0
2017–18	HK Kurbads	LAT	21	7	9	16	8	9	2	0	2	0
2018–19	HK Kurbads	LAT	36	20	26	46	12	10	4	7	11	2
2019–20	HK Kurbads	LAT	35	11	10	21	6	—	—	—	—	—
EEHL totals			204	25	25	50	46	—	—	—	—	—
LAT totals			174	88	89	177	52	41	17	20	37	10
KHL totals			302	41	41	82	104	28	2	0	2	27

- LAT totals do not include numbers from the 2005–06 season.

=== International ===
Year	Team	Event	GP	G	A	Pts	PIM
1998	Latvia	EJC C	4	0	1	1	2
2000	Latvia	WJC B	5	1	1	2	0
2005	Latvia	OGQ	3	1	1	2	0
2005	Latvia	WC	6	1	2	3	0
2006	Latvia	OG	5	1	1	2	0
2006	Latvia	WC	6	1	1	2	2
2007	Latvia	WC	6	1	4	5	2
2008	Latvia	WC	6	1	2	3	2
2009	Latvia	OGQ	3	1	0	1	0
2009	Latvia	WC	7	4	2	6	4
2010	Latvia	OG	4	1	1	2	0
2010	Latvia	WC	6	1	1	2	0
2011	Latvia	WC	6	4	2	6	2
2012	Latvia	WC	7	0	1	1	0
2013	Latvia	OGQ	3	0	1	1	0
2013	Latvia	WC	7	2	2	4	29
2014	Latvia	OG	5	0	0	0	0
2014	Latvia	WC	7	0	2	2	2
2015	Latvia	WC	6	0	0	0	0
Junior totals			9	1	2	3	2
Senior totals			93	19	23	42	43
