= Raitis Ivanāns =

Latvian ice hockey player

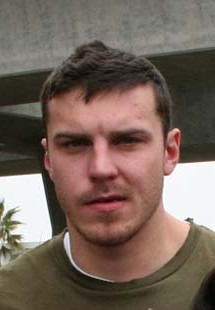
- Born: January 3, 1979 (age 47) Riga, Latvian SSR, Soviet Union
- Height: 6 ft 4 in (193 cm)
- Weight: 240 lb (109 kg; 17 st 2 lb)
- Position: Left wing
- Shot: Left
- Played for: Montreal Canadiens; Los Angeles Kings; Calgary Flames; Dinamo Riga
- National team: Latvia
- NHL draft: Undrafted
- Playing career: 1997–2013

Raitis Ivanāns (born January 3, 1979) is a Latvian former professional ice hockey forward who played in the National Hockey League (NHL) and was known primarily as an enforcer.

== Playing career ==
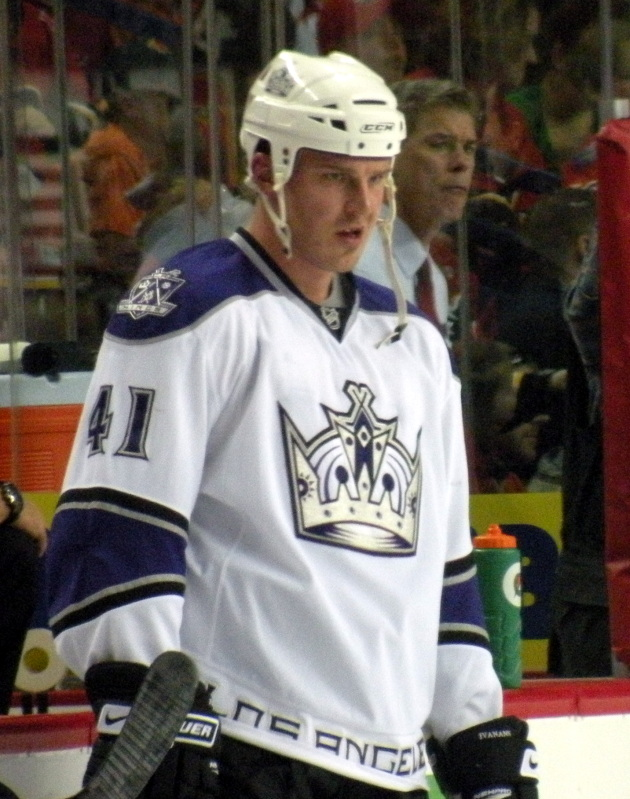
Ivanans with the Los Angeles Kings

In 1997, Ivanāns came over to North America and played for the Flint Generals. In 2005, he made his NHL debut with the Montreal Canadiens, accumulating 9 penalty minutes in 4 games. He got into a fight in his second game, against the Ottawa Senators, with Zdeno Chára, and sustained a broken orbital bone due to a late punch after he was down.

On July 13, 2006, he signed a one-year deal with the Los Angeles Kings. Ivanāns scored his first NHL goal against Marty Turco the Dallas Stars on October 12, 2006. On March 18, 2007, he signed a one-year, one-way deal with the Los Angeles Kings.

On January 29, 2008, Ivanāns signed a two-year contract extension with the Kings. In each of his four consecutive seasons in Los Angeles, Ivanāns led the team in penalty minutes.

On July 1, 2010, Raitis signed a two-year deal as a free agent with the Calgary Flames, and made his Flames debut on October 7, 2010 in the 2010-11 season opening against Edmonton Oilers; however he suffered a debilitating concussion during a third period fight with Oilers' heavyweight Steve MacIntyre.

On October 20, 2011, Ivanāns was sent to the Abbotsford Heat by Calgary, where he scored his first goal of the season on November 11 against the Texas Stars.

On May 22, 2012, Ivanans signed a two-year deal with Dinamo Rīga of the Kontinental Hockey League. During the 2012-13 season, he failed to establish a lasting role in 39 games with Riga, and was released prior to the second year of his contract.

== Career statistics ==
=== Regular season and playoffs ===
			Regular season					Playoffs
Season	Team	League	GP	G	A	Pts	PIM	GP	G	A	Pts	PIM
1996–97	Juniors Rīga	EEHL	3	0	0	0	2	—	—	—	—	—
1996–97	Juniors Rīga	LVA	5	0	0	0	4	—	—	—	—	—
1996–97	Aurora Tigers	MetJHL	25	4	7	11	20	—	—	—	—	—
1997–98	HK Liepājas Metalurgs	EEHL	4	0	0	0	4	—	—	—	—	—
1997–98	Flint Generals	UHL	18	0	1	1	20	—	—	—	—	—
1998–99	Macon Whoopee	CHL	16	1	1	2	20	—	—	—	—	—
1998–99	Tulsa Oilers	CHL	32	2	7	9	39	—	—	—	—	—
1999–2000	Pensacola Ice Pilots	ECHL	59	3	7	10	146	2	0	0	0	0
2000–01	New Haven Knights	UHL	66	4	10	14	270	8	1	0	1	4
2000–01	Hershey Bears	AHL	2	0	0	0	0	—	—	—	—	—
2001–02	Toledo Storm	ECHL	16	2	2	4	59	—	—	—	—	—
2001–02	Baton Rouge Kingfish	ECHL	40	4	5	9	180	—	—	—	—	—
2002–03	Rockford IceHogs	UHL	50	4	2	6	208	—	—	—	—	—
2002–03	Milwaukee Admirals	AHL	17	0	0	0	38	1	0	0	0	15
2003–04	Milwaukee Admirals	AHL	54	1	7	8	166	7	0	1	1	17
2004–05	Hamilton Bulldogs	AHL	75	2	5	7	259	2	0	1	1	0
2005–06	Hamilton Bulldogs	AHL	43	2	0	2	120	—	—	—	—	—
2005–06	Montreal Canadiens	NHL	4	0	0	0	9	—	—	—	—	—
2006–07	Los Angeles Kings	NHL	66	4	4	8	140	—	—	—	—	—
2007–08	Los Angeles Kings	NHL	73	6	2	8	134	—	—	—	—	—
2008–09	Los Angeles Kings	NHL	76	2	0	2	145	—	—	—	—	—
2009–10	Los Angeles Kings	NHL	61	0	0	0	136	1	0	0	0	0
2010–11	Calgary Flames	NHL	1	0	0	0	5	—	—	—	—	—
2011–12	Calgary Flames	NHL	1	0	0	0	0	—	—	—	—	—
2011–12	Abbotsford Heat	AHL	27	2	3	5	37	—	—	—	—	—
2012–13	Dinamo Riga	KHL	39	0	1	1	84	—	—	—	—	—
NHL totals			282	12	6	18	569	1	0	0	0	0

=== International ===
Year	Team	Event	Result	GP	G	A	Pts	PIM
1999	Latvia	WJC B	15th	6	0	1	1	6
2008	Latvia	WC	11th	6	0	0	0	31
Junior totals				6	0	1	1	6
Senior totals				6	0	0	0	31

== Awards and honours ==
Award	Year
AHL
Calder Cup	2004
