= HK Riga (1997) =

Latvian ice hockey club

- City: Riga, Latvia
- League: Eastern European Hockey League
- Founded: 1997

HK Riga was a Latvian ice hockey team. They played in the 1997-98 Eastern European Hockey League season.

== History ==
The club was founded in 1997, and began playing in the Eastern European Hockey League. Their stay in the EEHL lasted only one year, and the team folded after their first season.

HK Riga finished with an 8-27-1 record, with 82 goals for, and 177 goals against.

== Notable players ==
- Agris Saviels
- Edgars Masaļskis
- Aleksejs Širokovs
- Georgijs Pujacs
