= Mārtiņš Raitums =

Latvian ice hockey player

- Born: 14 April 1985 (age 39); Talsi, Latvian SSR, Soviet Union
- Height: 1.85 m (6 ft 1 in)
- Weight: 95 kg (209 lb; 14 st 13 lb)
- Position: Goaltender
- Caught: Left
- KAZ team Former teams: Arystan Temirtau: Beibarys Atyrau; Hull Stingrays; ASK Ogre; HK Riga 2000; HK Neman Grodno
- National team: Latvia
- Playing career: 2003–2018

Mārtiņš Raitums (born 14 April 1985) was a Latvian ice hockey goaltender who participated at the 2010 IIHF World Championship as a member of the Latvia men's national ice hockey team. He has played for Arystan Temirtau in the Kazakhstan Hockey Championship league. Five time Latvian champion and two time Kazakh champion.
