= Flavio Faggioni =

Italian ice hockey player (born 1981)

- Born: August 18, 1981 (age 44) Bolzano, Italy
- Height: 5 ft 9 in (175 cm)
- Weight: 181 lb (82 kg; 12 st 13 lb)
- Position: Centre
- Shoots: Left
- Austria2 team: Meran/Merano
- National team: Italy
- NHL draft: Undrafted
- Playing career: 2001–present

Flavio Faggioni (born August 18, 1981) is an Italian ice hockey player. He is currently playing with Meran/Merano of the Austrian lower leagues.

Faggioni competed at the 2007 IIHF World Championship as a member of the Italy national ice hockey team.
