= 1995–96 EEHL season =

The 1995–96 Eastern European Hockey League season, was the first season of the multi-national ice hockey league. Eight teams participated in the league, and HK Neman Grodno of Belarus won the championship.

== First round ==
#	Team	GP	W	D	L	Goals	Pts
1.	(Belarus) HK Neman Grodno	28	26	1	1	154:57	53
2.	(Belarus) Polimir Novopolotsk	28	22	2	4	175:67	46
3.	(Belarus) Belstal Zhlobin	28	15	4	9	113:84	34
4.	(Latvia) Juniors Riga	28	13	3	12	122:74	29
5.	(Ukraine) HK Sokol Kiev	28	12	3	13	94:86	27
6.	(Ukraine) HK Kryzynka-KPI Kiev	28	7	4	17	99:136	18
7.	(Lithuania) SC Energija	28	6	3	19	77:151	15
8.	(Belarus) HK Junost Minsk	28	0	2	26	44:223	2

== Final round ==
=== Championship round ===
Pl.	Team	GP	W	T	L	Goals	Pkt.
1.	HK Neman Grodno	12	8	1	3	36:23	17
2.	Juniors Riga	12	6	4	2	43:34	16
3.	Polimir Novopolotsk	12	3	3	6	33:39	9
4.	Belstal Zhlobin	12	2	2	8	29:45	6

=== 5th-8th place ===
Pl.	Team	GP	W	T	L	Goals	Pkt.
1.	HK Sokol Kiev	12	10	0	2	57:28	20
2.	SC Energija	12	7	0	5	45:39	14
3.	HK Kryzynka-KPI Kiev	12	6	1	5	46:53	13
4.	HK Junost Minsk	12	0	1	11	30:58	1
