= 1996–97 EEHL season =

The 1996–97 Eastern European Hockey League season, was the second season of the multi-national ice hockey league. Nine teams participated in the league, and Juniors Riga of Latvia won the championship.

== Regular season ==
| Pl. | Team | GP | W | T | L | Goals | Pkt. |
|---|---|---|---|---|---|---|---|
| 1. | HK Sokol Kiev | 32 | 27 | 3 | 2 | 198:42 | 57 |
| 2. | Polimir Novopolotsk | 32 | 25 | 2 | 5 | 187:73 | 52 |
| 3. | HK Neman Grodno | 32 | 18 | 6 | 8 | 168:80 | 42 |
| 4. | Tivali Minsk | 32 | 17 | 5 | 10 | 124:80 | 39 |
| 5. | Juniors Riga | 32 | 14 | 4 | 14 | 106:109 | 32 |
| 6. | HK Junost Minsk | 32 | 9 | 4 | 19 | 91:145 | 22 |
| 7. | Olimpia Sosnowiec | 32 | 7 | 5 | 20 | 90:164 | 19 |
| 8. | HK Kryzynka Kiev | 32 | 5 | 5 | 22 | 76:164 | 15 |
| 9. | SC Energija | 32 | 4 | 2 | 26 | 74:257 | 10 |

== Playoffs ==
Quarterfinals
1 | HK Sokol Kiev | 2
9 | SC Energija | 0
3 | HK Neman Grodno | 2
6 | HK Junost Minsk | 0
2 | Polimir Novopolotsk | 2
8 | HK Ldinka Kiev | 0
4 | Tivali Minsk | 1
5 | Juniors Riga | 2

Semifinals
1 | HK Sokol Kiev | 2
3 | HK Neman Grodno | 0
2 | Polimir Novopolotsk | 1
5 | Juniors Riga | 2

Final
1 | HK Sokol Kiev | 2
5 | Juniors Riga | 3

=== 3rd place ===
- Polimir Novopolotsk 3 HK Neman Grodno 1
