= 2001–02 EEHL season =

The 2001–02 Eastern European Hockey League season, was the seventh season of the multi-national ice hockey league. 17 teams participated in the league, and HK Liepajas Metalurgs of Latvia won the championship.

== Regular season ==
=== EEHL A ===
Pl.	Team	GP	W	OTW	T	OTL	L	Goals	Pkt.
1.	HK Liepājas Metalurgs	32	17	1	4	1	9	114:78	58
2.	HK Neman Grodno	32	16	0	7	2	7	93:79	57
3.	HK Keramin Minsk	32	15	1	6	0	10	87:68	53
4.	HK Berkut-Kiev	32	14	3	4	1	10	91:81	53
5.	HK Homel	32	12	2	7	0	11	83:83	47
6.	HK Riga 2000	32	12	2	2	1	15	111:108	43
7.	HK MGU Moscow	32	11	1	2	2	16	92:116	39
8.	HK Sokol Kiev	32	11	0	3	2	16	83:100	38
9.	Polimir Novopolotsk	32	8	0	1	1	22	96:137	26

=== EEHL B ===
Pl.	Team	GP	W	OTW	T	OTL	L	Goals	Pkt.
1.	HK Khimvolokno Mogilev	28	25	0	0	0	3	239:48	75
2.	HK Vitebsk	28	22	1	1	0	4	204:71	69
3.	Donbass Donetsk	28	15	1	0	0	12	139:98	47
4.	HK Prizma Riga	28	13	0	2	1	12	122-138	42
5.	SC Energija	28	13	0	1	0	14	110-142	40
6.	HK Kiev	28	10	0	1	1	16	91-135	32
7.	HK Neman Grodno II	28	7	0	1	0	20	77-167	22
8.	Vityaz Charkov	28	2	0	0	0	26	51-234	6

=== Qualification ===
- HK Khimvolokno Mogilev - HK Sokol Kiev 3:1 (0-0,2-1,1-0)
- HK Sokol Kiev - HK Khimvolokno Mogilev 4:0 (1-0,3-0,0-0)

== Playoffs ==
Quarterfinals
2	(Belarus) HK Neman Grodno	0
7	(Russia) HK MGU Moscow	2
3	(Belarus) HK Keramin Minsk	1
6	(Latvia) HK Riga 2000	2
1	(Latvia) HK Liepājas Metalurgs	2
8	(Ukraine) HK Sokol Kiev	0
4	(Ukraine) HK Berkut Kiev	2
5	(Belarus) HK Homel	0

Semifinals
(Russia) HK MGU Moscow	1
(Latvia) HK Riga 2000	3
(Latvia) HK Liepājas Metalurgs	3
(Ukraine) HK Berkut Kiev	1

Final
(Latvia) HK Riga 2000	2
(Latvia) HK Liepājas Metalurgs	3

=== 3rd place ===
- HK Berkut Kiev 1.5 - HK MGU Moscow 0.5
