= 2000–01 EEHL season =

The 2000–01 Eastern European Hockey League season, was the sixth season of the multinational ice hockey league. Nine teams participated in the league, and HC Berkut Kyiv of Ukraine won the championship.

== Regular season ==
Pl.	Team	GP	W	T	L	Goals	Pkt.
1.	HK Berkut-Kiev	32	23	5	4	170:49	51
2.	HK Neman Grodno	32	20	5	7	143:71	45
3.	HK Sokol Kiev	32	19	6	7	128:73	44
4.	Polimir Novopolotsk	32	18	3	11	145:108	39
5.	HK Liepājas Metalurgs	32	18	3	11	111:88	39
6.	HK Minsk	32	13	5	14	128:100	31
7.	HK Riga 2000	32	8	8	16	110:117	24
8.	HK Kiev	32	3	2	27	61:224	8
9.	SC Energija	32	2	3	27	73:239	7

== Playoffs ==
Quarterfinals
1	(Ukraine) HK Berkut Kiev	2
8	(Ukraine) HK Kiev	0
4	(Belarus) Polimir Novopolotsk	1
5	(Latvia) HK Liepājas Metalurgs	2
3	(Ukraine) HK Sokol Kiev	0
6	(Belarus) HK Minsk	2
2	(Belarus) HK Neman Grodno	0
7	(Latvia) HK Riga 2000	2

Semifinals
1	(Ukraine) HK Berkut Kiev	3
5	(Latvia) HK Liepājas Metalurgs	0
6	(Belarus) HK Minsk	0
7	(Latvia) HK Riga 2000	3

Final
1	(Ukraine) HK Berkut Kiev	3
7	(Latvia) HK Riga 2000	0
