= 1998–99 EEHL season =

The 1998–99 Eastern European Hockey League season, was the fourth season of the Eastern European Hockey League. 12 teams participated in the league, and HK Sokol Kiev of Ukraine won the championship.

== First round ==
Pl.	Team	GP	W	T	L	Goals	Pkt.
1.	HK Sokol Kiev	28	22	2	4	125:41	46
2.	HK Neman Grodno	28	17	4	7	106:64	38
3.	Polimir Novopolotsk	28	14	4	10	98:80	32
4.	Tivali Minsk	28	12	4	12	77:85	28
5.	HK Berkut-Kiev	28	12	4	12	85:72	28
6.	HK Junost Minsk	28	12	4	12	111:109	28
7.	HK Liepājas Metalurgs	28	10	3	15	65:89	23
8.	HK Kryzynka Kiev	28	0	1	27	58:185	1

== Second round ==
=== Champions round ===
Pl.	Team	GP	W	T	L	Goals	BP	Pkt.
1.	HK Sokol Kiev	16	10	3	3	65:32	5	28
2.	HK Neman Grodno	16	8	3	5	55:49	4	23
3.	Polimir Novopolotsk	16	7	2	7	48:51	3	19
4.	Tivali Minsk	16	4	4	8	39:59	2	14
5.	HK Berkut Kiev	16	4	2	10	37:53	1	11

=== Qualification round ===
Pl.	Team	GP	W	T	L	Goals	Pkt.
6.	HK Liepājas Metalurgs	24	20	1	3	166:57	41
7.	HK Ldinka Kiev	24	16	2	6	100:80	34
8.	HK Sokol Kiev II	24	15	0	9	114:68	30
9.	HK Junost Minsk	24	10	4	10	113:105	24
10.	SC Energija	24	8	3	13	107:110	19
11.	HK Neman Grodno II	24	8	2	14	100:141	18
12.	Khimik-SHVSM Novopolotsk	24	1	0	23	57:196	2

== Playoffs ==
Quarterfinals
5	(Ukraine) HK Berkut Kiev	2
4	(Belarus) Tiwali Minsk	0
6	(Latvia) HK Liepājas Metalurgs	2
3	(Belarus) Polimir Novopolotsk	1

Semifinals
1	(Ukraine) HK Sokol Kiev	3
5	(Ukraine) HK Berkut Kiev	1
2	(Belarus) HK Neman Grodno	3
6	(Latvia) HK Liepājas Metalurgs	2

Final
1	(Ukraine) HK Sokol Kiev	3
2	(Belarus) HK Neman Grodno	0
