= 1999–2000 EEHL season =

The 1999–2000 Eastern European Hockey League season, was the fifth season of the multi-national ice hockey league. 13 teams participated in the league, and HC Berkut-Kyiv of Ukraine won the championship.

== First round ==
=== EEHL A ===
Pl.	Team	GP	W	T	L	Goals	Pkt.
1.	Sokil Kyiv	28	19	5	4	123:51	43
2.	HK Liepājas Metalurgs	28	20	2	6	106:54	42
3.	HC Berkut-Kyiv	28	17	5	6	84:56	39
4.	Tivali Minsk	28	14	2	12	93:97	30
5.	Polimir Novopolotsk	28	11	3	14	87:93	25
6.	HK Junost Minsk	28	10	3	15	83:90	23
7.	HK Neman Grodno	28	7	4	17	73:107	18
8.	HK Kryzhynka Kyiv	28	1	2	25	35:136	4

=== EEHL B ===
Pl.	Team	GP	W	T	L	Goals	Pkt.
1.	Legion Kyiv	14	12	0	2	91:37	24
2.	Dinamo '81 Riga	16	9	1	5	61:57	19
3.	HK Sokil Kyiv II	14	7	2	5	57:41	16
4.	Essamika/Juniors Riga	16	6	2	8	67:66	14
5.	HK Junost Minsk II	16	1	1	14	42:114	3

== Second round ==
=== Group A ===
Pl.	Team	GP	W	T	L	Goals	Pkt.
1.	HK Sokil Kyiv	12	8	3	1	52:20	19
2.	HK Berkut Kyiv	12	8	2	2	52:22	18
3.	HK Neman Grodno	12	4	0	8	33:47	8
4.	Polimir Novopolotsk	12	1	1	10	21:69	3

=== Group B ===
Pl.	Team	GP	W	T	L	Goals	Pkt.
1.	HK Liepājas Metalurgs	12	10	0	2	71:29	20
2.	HK Junost Minsk	12	7	0	5	63:47	14
3.	Tiwali Minsk	12	6	1	5	52:61	13
4.	HK Kryzhynka Kyiv	12	0	1	11	32:81	1

== Playoffs ==
Quarterfinals
A1	(Ukraine) HK Sokil Kyiv	2
B4	(Ukraine) HK Kryzhynka Kyiv	0
B2	(Belarus) HK Junost Minsk	1
A3	(Belarus) HK Neman Grodno	2
B1	(Latvia) HK Liepājas Metalurgs	2
A4	(Belarus) Polimir Novopolotsk	0
A2	(Ukraine) HK Berkut Kyiv	2
B3	(Belarus) Tivali Minsk	0

Semifinals
A1	(Ukraine) HK Sokil Kyiv	3
A3	(Belarus) HK Neman Grodno	2
B1	(Latvia) HK Liepājas Metalurgs	1
A2	(Ukraine) HK Berkut Kyiv	3

Final
A1	(Ukraine) HK Sokil Kyiv	0
A2	(Ukraine) HK Berkut Kyiv	3

=== 3rd place ===
- HK Liepajas Metalurgs 2 HK Neman Grodno 0
