= 1997–98 EEHL season =

The 1997–98 Eastern European Hockey League season, was the third season of the multi-national ice hockey league. 10 teams participated in the league, and HK Sokol Kiev of Ukraine won the championship.

== First round ==
Pl.	Team	GP	W	T	L	Goals	Pkt.
1.	HK Sokol Kiev	36	30	2	4	160:47	62
2.	HK Neman Grodno	36	28	4	4	171:46	60
3.	Polimir Novopolotsk	36	26	3	7	171:75	55
4.	Juniors Essamika Riga	36	23	2	11	149:85	48
5.	Tivali Minsk	36	15	2	19	123:106	32
6.	HK Junost Minsk	36	15	1	20	141:140	31
7.	HK Berkut-Kiev	36	12	4	20	100:110	28
8.	HK Riga	36	8	1	27	82:177	17
9.	SC Energija	36	7	1	28	88:223	15
10.	HK Kryzynka Kiev	36	6	0	30	66:242	12

== Final round ==
=== Championship round ===
Pl.	Team	GP	W	T	L	Goals	Pkt.
1.	HK Sokol Kiev	46	39	3	4	213:56	81
2.	HK Neman Grodno	46	35	4	7	216:72	74
3.	Polimir Novopolotsk	46	32	4	10	211:109	68
4.	Juniors Essamika Riga	46	25	3	18	174:130	53
5.	Tivali Minsk	46	17	3	26	148:155	37
6.	HK Junost Minsk	46	16	3	27	176:200	35

=== 5th-8th place ===
Pl.	Team	GP	W	T	L	Goals	Pkt.
1.	HK Berkut Kiev	48	20	5	23	153:133	45
2.	HK Kryzynka Kiev	48	13	2	33	103:277	28
3.	SC Energija	48	10	4	34	122:270	24
4.	HK Riga	48	10	3	35	110:224	23
