= Eastern European Hockey League =

European professional ice hockey league

- Sport: Ice hockey
- Founded: 1995
- Folded: 2004
- No. of teams: 9
- Countries: Belarus; Latvia; Lithuania; Poland; Russia; Ukraine
- Last champion: Keramin Minsk
- Most titles: Sokil Kyiv, Berkut-Kyiv, Keramin Minsk (2 each)

The Eastern European Hockey League (EEHL) was a regional ice hockey league which existed from 1995 to 2004.

== History ==
The league was formed in 1995 by Belarus, Latvia, Lithuania and Ukraine, to provide a higher-level competition for teams from those countries. In some years, the league also included teams from Poland and Russia. Besides the main tournament for professional ice hockey teams, the league also had junior championships in several age groups.

In 2004, it was dissolved. Instead, two teams from Latvia (Metalurgs Liepāja and Rīga 2000) and one team from Ukraine (Sokil Kyiv) joined the Belarusian Extraliga. There was temporarily a period where the Belarusian Extraliga was closed to foreign teams, but that has since changed as Metalurgs Liepāja, Dinamo/Juniors Rīga, and Sokil Kyiv became members of the league.

== Teams of the last season (2003–04) ==
Division A

- (Latvia) HK Rīga 2000
- (Latvia) HK Metalurgs Liepāja
- (Latvia) ASK/Ogre
- (Ukraine) Sokil Kyiv
- (Belarus) HK Neman Grodno
- (Belarus) Keramin Minsk
- (Belarus) HK Gomel
- (Belarus) Khimvolokno
- (Russia) Titan Klin

Division B

- (Belarus) HK Vitebsk
- (Ukraine) HK Kyiv
- (Belarus) Junior Minsk
- (Belarus) HK Gomel
- (Latvia) Riga 85
- (Belarus) Khimvolokno Mogilev

== EEHL champions ==
- 1995–96: (Belarus) HK Neman Grodno
- 1996–97: (Latvia) Juniors Rīga
- 1997–98: (Ukraine) Sokil Kyiv
- 1998–99: (Ukraine) Sokil Kyiv
- 1999–00: (Ukraine) Berkut Kyiv
- 2000–01: (Ukraine) Berkut Kyiv
- 2001–02: (Latvia) Metalurgs Liepāja
- 2002–03: (Belarus) Keramin Minsk
- 2003–04: (Belarus) Keramin Minsk

== EEHL Cup winners ==
- 1997–98: (Ukraine) Sokil Kyiv
- 1998–99: (Ukraine) Sokil Kyiv
- 2000–01: (Ukraine) Berkut Kyiv
- 2003–04: (Russia) Titan Klin
