= HC Berkut-Kyiv =

- Nickname: "Golden Eagles"
- City: Kyiv
- League: Ukrainian Hockey League (1997–2002); Eastern European Hockey League (1997–2002)
- Founded: 1997
- Folded: 2002
- Home arena: Avangard
- Colours

Franchise history
- HC Berkut-Kyiv: HC Berkut-PPO (1997–98)

Hockey Club Berkut-Kyiv (Ukrainian: ХК Беркут-Київ, English: HC Golden Eagle Kyiv) was an ice hockey team in Kyiv, Ukraine, that existed from 1997 to 2002. The team played in the Ukrainian Hockey League and the Eastern European Hockey League.

== Berkut-PPO and Berkut-Kyiv ==
It was founded in 1997 as a farm team of Sokil Kyiv under the name of Berkut-PPO. Previously in 1995-96 season another "one-season" team associated with Obolon (hence abbreviation PPO) participated in Ukrainian competitions and later during the season changed its name to IVARs.

In 1998 based on the Sokil's farm team Berkut-PPO, there was established a separate club HC Berkut-Kyiv.

== Berkut Brovary and Podil Kyiv ==
After liquidation of HC Berkut-Kyiv in 2002, in 2004 another HC Berkut was established in Brovary (city satellite of Kyiv). In 2009 that club moved to Kyiv and for one season (2009-10) was known as Berkut Kyiv. In 2010-11 the club played under the name of HC Podil Kyiv, before it was liquidated. One of founders of HC Berkut Brovary, split in 2007 and established another club HC Bars Brovary which eventually became Bilyi Bars from Bila Tserkva.

== Achievements ==
- Ukrainian champion : 2000, 2001, 2002.
- EEHL champion : 2000, 2001.
