= List of Olympic men's ice hockey players for Latvia =

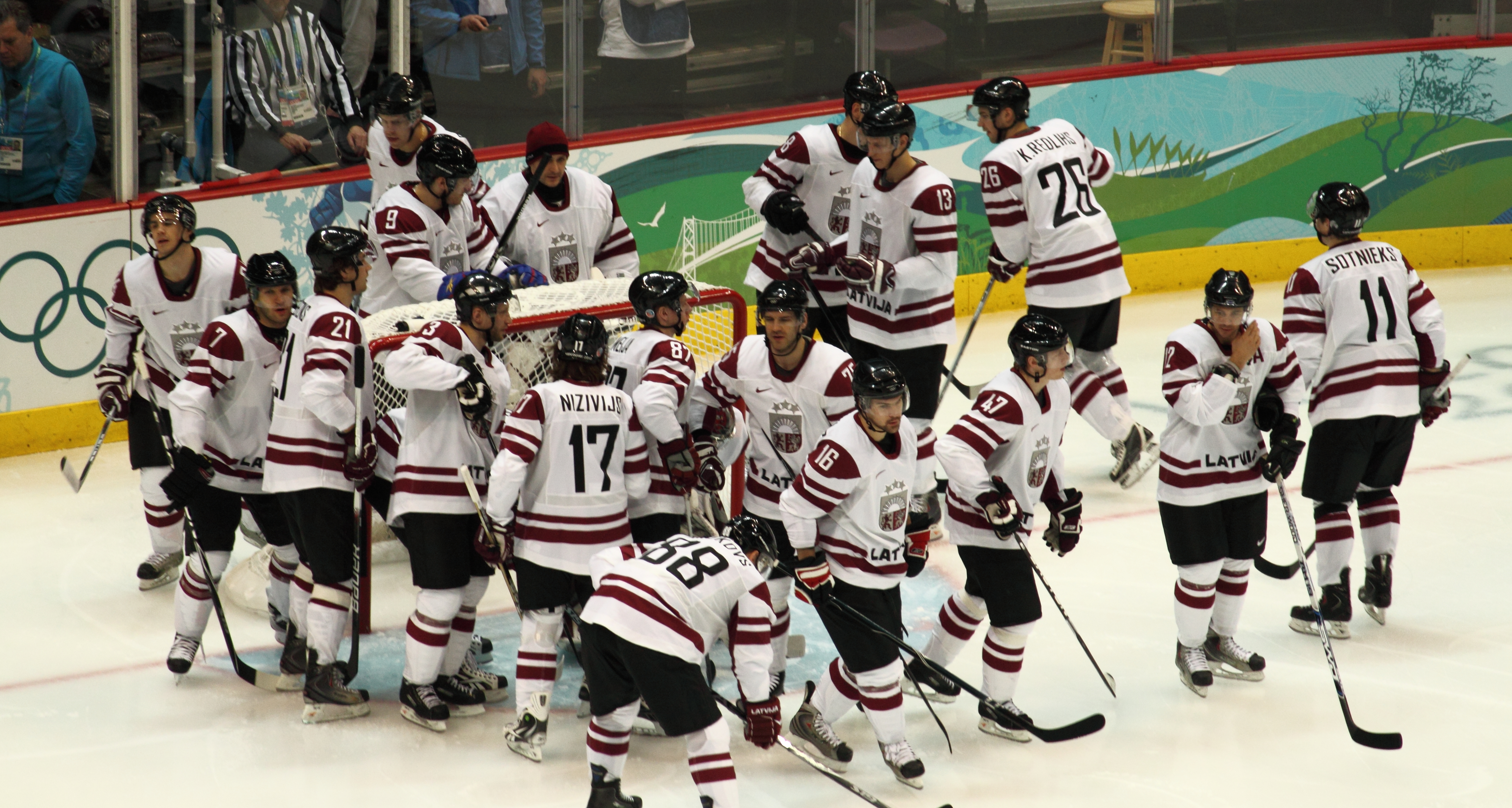
The Latvian national team at the 2010 Winter Olympics.

The list of Olympic men's ice hockey players for Latvia consists of 74 skaters and 9 goaltenders. Men's ice hockey tournaments have been staged at the Olympic Games since 1920 (it was introduced at the 1920 Summer Olympics, and was permanently added to the Winter Olympic Games in 1924). Latvia has participated in six tournaments: 1936, 2002, 2006, 2010, 2014 and 2022. From 1956 until 1992 Latvia also participated in the Olympics as part of the Soviet Union and the Unified Team (for 1992). Latvia has never won a medal in ice hockey, with their highest finish being eighth in 2014.

Fourteen players have played in three separate Olympics, while five players — Mārtiņš Cipulis, Georgijs Pujacs, Krišjānis Rēdlihs, Miķelis Rēdlihs, and Arvīds Reķis — have played in the most games, 14 each. Lauris Dārziņš have the most goals, with 6, while Ņiživijs has the most assists (8), and points (12) for Latvia. Two Latvian players, Helmuts Balderis and Artūrs Irbe, have been inducted into the International Ice Hockey Federation Hall of Fame, though Balderis only played for the Soviet Union at the Olympics.

== Key ==
General terms
Term	Definition
GP	Games played
IIHFHOF	International Ice Hockey Federation Hall of Fame
Olympics	Number of Olympic Games tournaments
Ref(s)	Reference(s)

Goaltender statistical abbreviations
Abbreviation	Definition
W	Wins
L	Losses
T	Ties
Min	Minutes played
SO	Shutouts
GA	Goals against
GAA	Goals against average

Skater statistical abbreviations
Abbreviation	Definition
G	Goals
A	Assists
P	Points
PIM	Penalty minutes

== Goaltenders ==
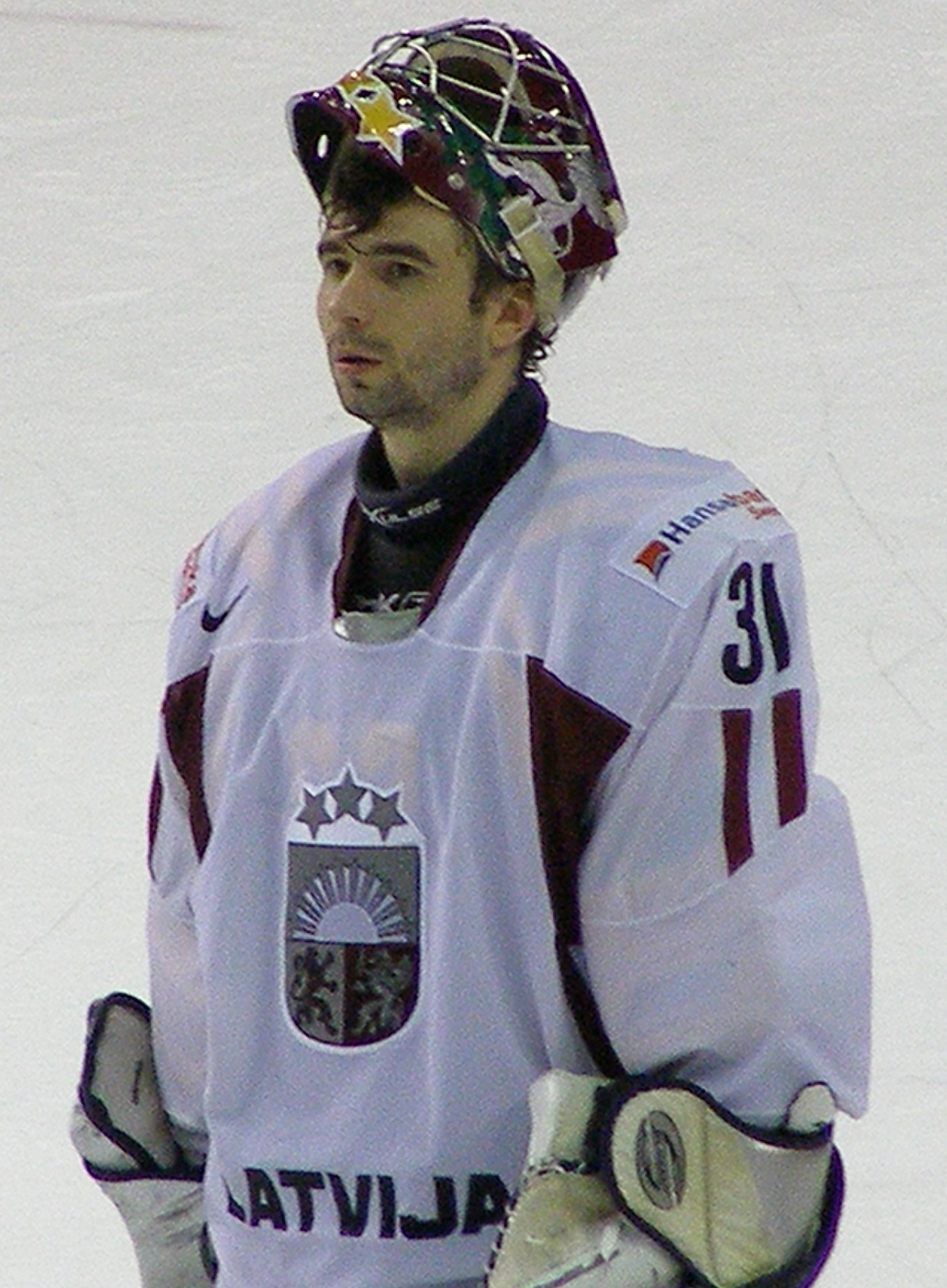
Edgars Masaļskis played nine games for Latvia in three Olympics.

Goaltenders
Player	Olympics	Tournament(s)	GP	W	L	T	Min	SO	GA	GAA	Notes	Ref(s)
Kristers Gudļevskis	3	2014, 2022, 2026	2	0	2	0	119	0	7	3.54		
Artūrs Irbe	2	2002, 2006	4	0	3	1	208	0	18	5.19	IIHFHOF (2010)	
Jānis Kalniņš	1	2022	3	0	2	0	126	0	7	3.33		
Herberts Kušķis	1	1936	1	0	1	0	45	0	9	12.00		
Roberts Lapainis	1	1936	2	0	2	0	90	0	18	12.00		
Edgars Masaļskis	4	2002, 2006, 2010, 2014	8	1	4	0	457	0	31	4.07		
Elvis Merzļikins	1	2026	2	0	2	0	51	0	9	5.40		
Ervīns Muštukovs	2	2010, 2014	0	0	0	0	0	0	0	0.00		
Sergejs Naumovs	3	2002, 2006, 2010	5	2	2	1	300	0	21	4.20		
Ivars Punnenovs	1	2022	2	0	2	0	110	0	6	3.26		
Artūrs Šilovs	1	2026	3	1	2	0	48	0	7	3.01		

== Skaters ==
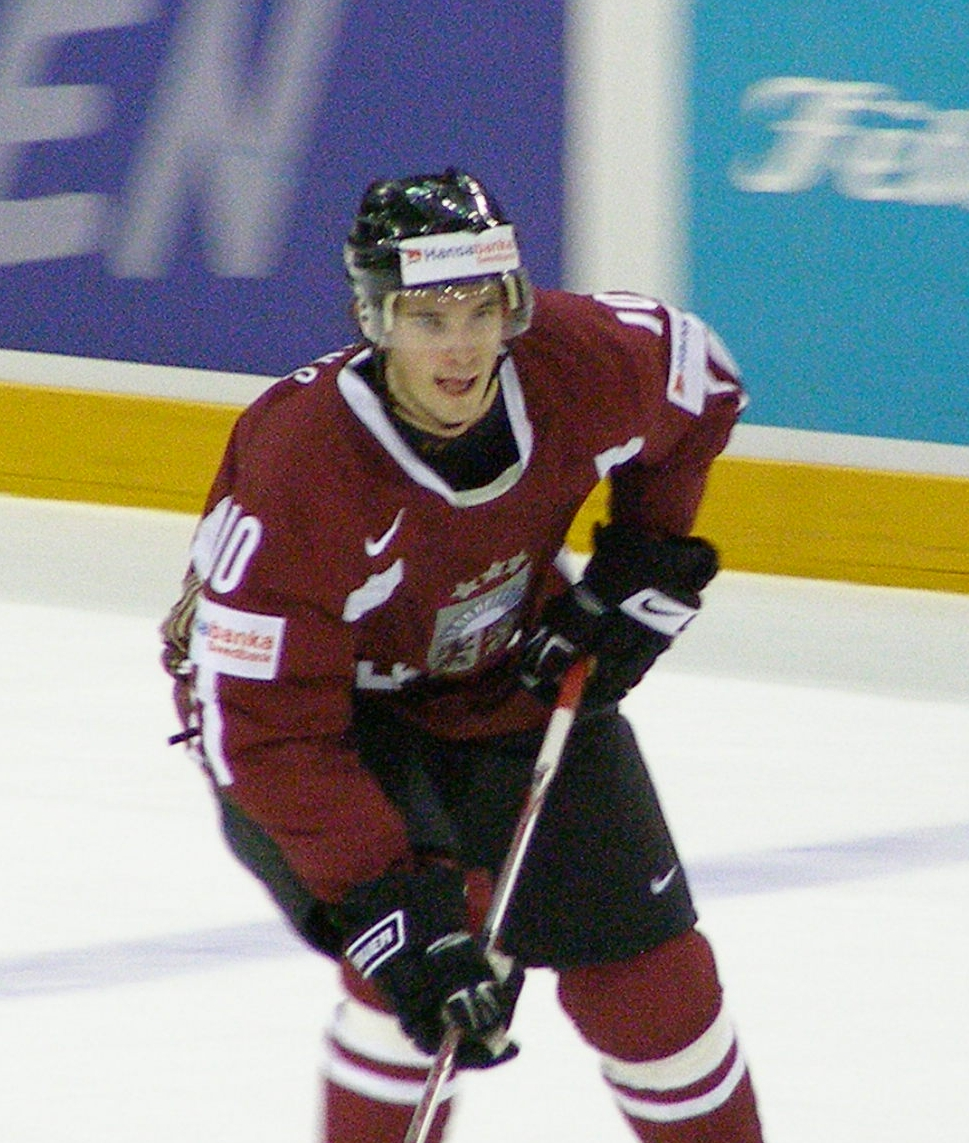
Lauris Dārziņš has scored four goals at the Olympics, tied with two others for the most for Latvia.

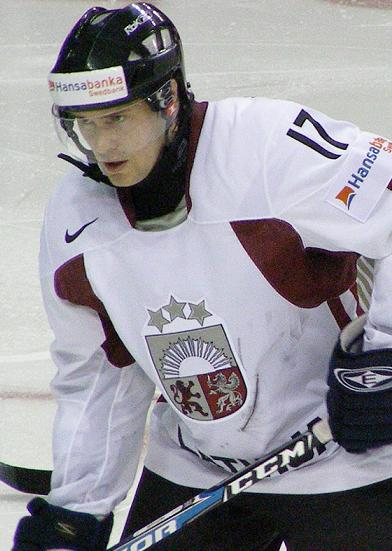
Aleksandrs Ņiživijs is Latvia's leading scorer at the Olympics, with 12 points over three tournaments.

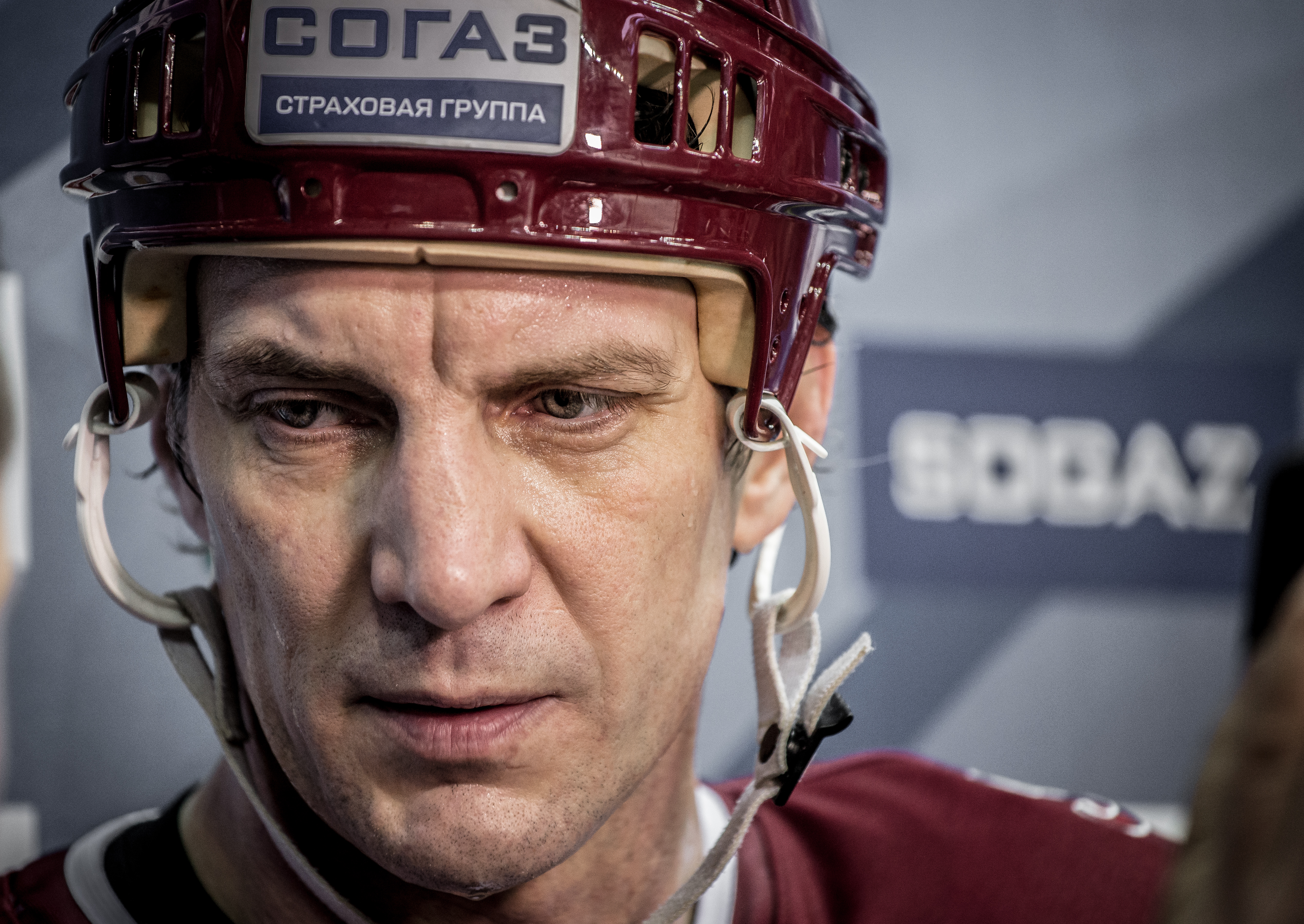
Sandis Ozoliņš recorded 8 points in 11 games over three Olympics.

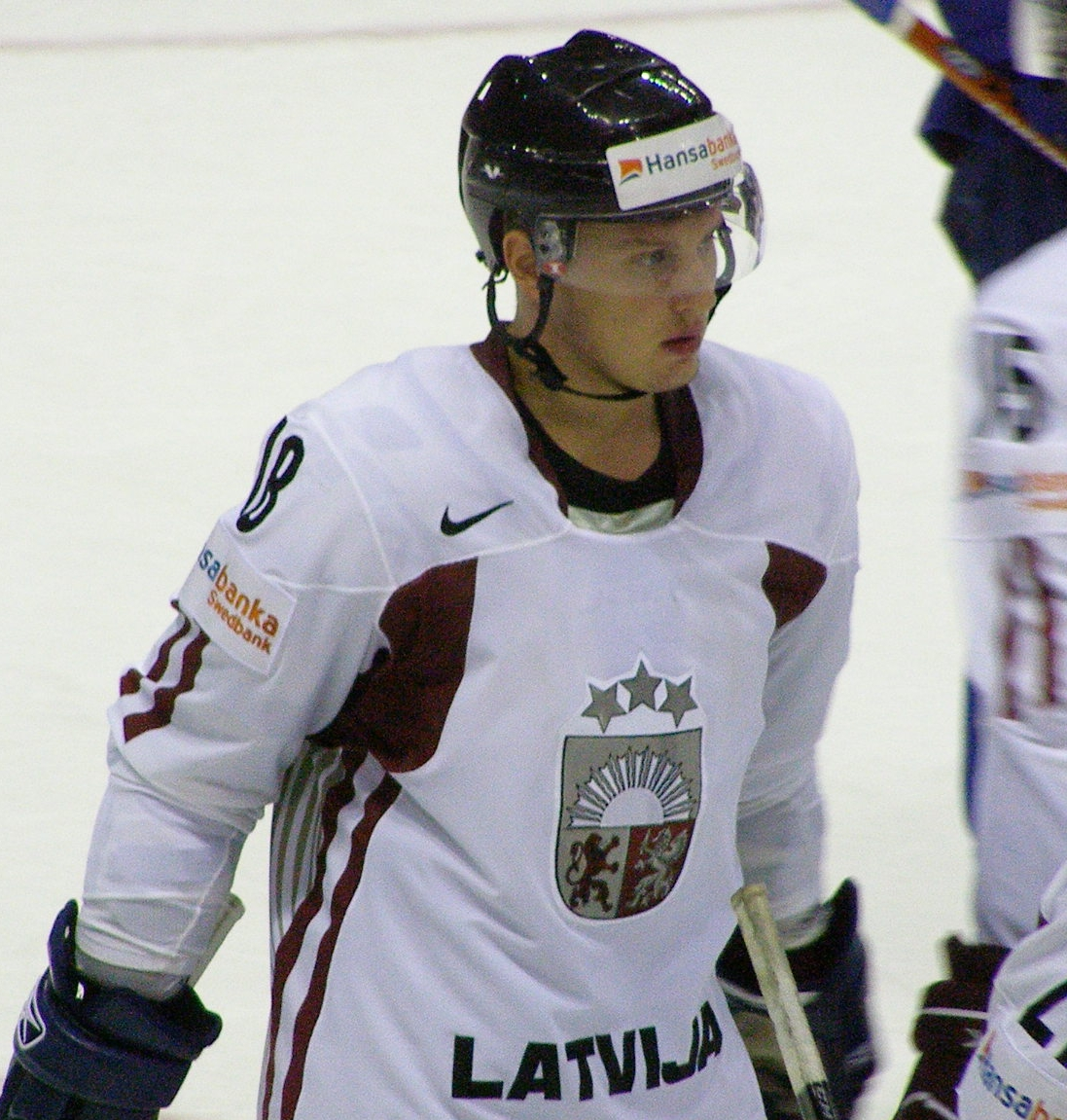
Georgijs Pujacs has played in three Olympics for Latvia.

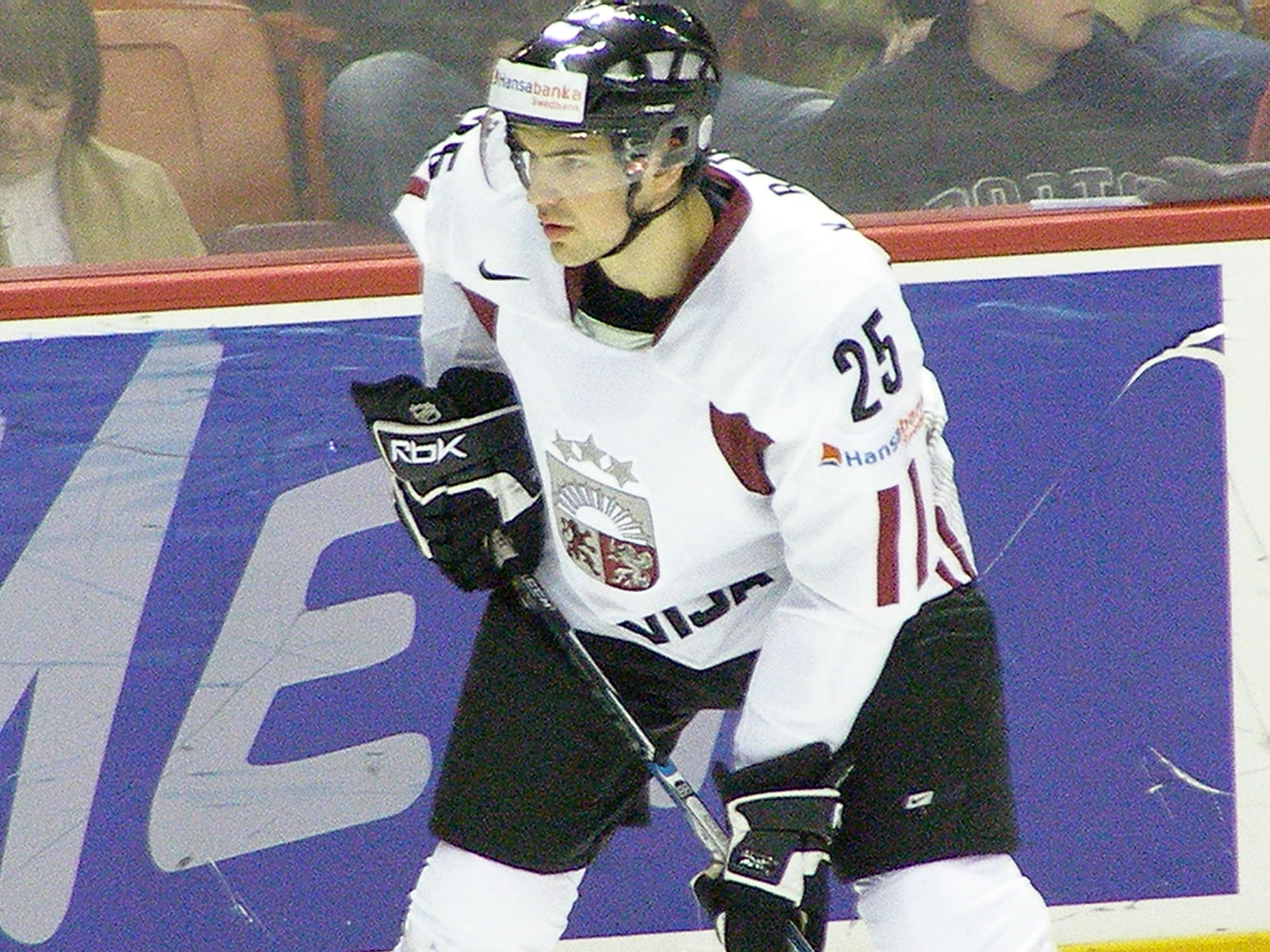
Krišjānis Rēdlihs is one of five players to have played 14 games for Latvia.

Skaters
Player	Olympics	Tournaments	GP	G	A	P	PIM	Notes	Ref(s)
Rodrigo Ābols	1	2022	4	1	1	2	2		
Toms Andersons	1	2022	1	0	0	0	0		
Ģirts Ankipāns	2	2006, 2010	9	2	0	2	4		
Kaspars Astašenko	1	2002	3	1	0	1	0		
Aleksejs Auziņš	1	1936	2	0	0	0	0		
Rūdolfs Balcers	1	2026	3	0	1	1	0		
Uvis Balinskis	2	2022, 2026	8	0	4	4	2		
Oskars Bārtulis	2	2010, 2014	9	1	0	1	2		
Oskars Batņa	2	2022, 2026	8	0	0	0	2		
Jānis Bebris	1	1936	3	1	0	1	0		
Aleksandrs Beļavskis	1	2002	4	1	1	2	4		
Armands Bērziņš	3	2006, 2010, 2014	11	0	2	2	6		
Teodors Bļugers	1	2026	4	0	1	1	2		
Roberts Bluķis	1	1936	3	0	0	0	0		
Igors Bondarevs	1	2002	4	2	2	4	0		
Rihards Bukarts	2	2022, 2026	8	0	0	0	0		
Roberts Bukarts	1	2026	3	0	0	0	0		
Oskars Cibuļskis	2	2022, 2026	7	0	2	2	0		
Aigars Cipruss	2	2002, 2006	9	3	3	6	6		
Mārtiņš Cipulis	3	2006, 2010, 2014	14	2	2	4	0		
Lauris Dārziņš	3	2010, 2014, 2022	12	6	4	10	14	Team Captain (2022)	
Kaspars Daugaviņš	4	2010, 2014, 2022, 2026	16	0	3	3	6	Team Captain (2026)	
Andris Džeriņš	1	2022	3	0	0	0	2		
Mārtiņš Dzierkals	2	2022, 2026	8	0	0	0	2		
Haralds Egle	1	2026	2	0	0	0	1		
Vjačeslavs Fanduļs	1	2002	4	4	0	4	2		
Ralfs Freibergs	3	2014, 2022, 2026	11	0	1	1	2		
Guntis Galviņš	1	2010	2	0	0	0	0		
Zemgus Girgensons	2	2014, 2026	9	1	5	6	2		
Viktors Ignatjevs	1	2002	4	0	0	0	4		
Miks Indrašis	2	2014, 2022	8	1	0	1	4		
Jānis Jaks	2	2022, 2026	7	0	2	2	2		
Koba Jass	1	2014	3	0	0	0	4		
Nikolajs Jeļisejevs	1	2022	4	1	0	1	2		
Arvīds Jurgens	1	1936	3	0	0	0	2		
Mārtiņš Karsums	3	2010, 2014, 2022	9	0	3	3	4		
Ronalds Ķēniņš	2	2014, 2022	9	1	0	1	2		
Aleksandrs Kerčs	1	2002	4	0	3	3	2		
Renārs Krastenbergs	2	2022, 2026	8	3	5	8	4		
Artūrs Kulda	2	2014, 2022	8	0	1	1	2		
Rodrigo Laviņš	3	2002, 2006, 2010	13	0	1	1	6		
Dans Ločmelis	1	2026	4	2	0	2	0		
Aleksandrs Macijevskis	1	2002	4	2	3	5	0		
Roberts Mamčics	2	2022, 2026	8	0	0	0	4		
Vladimirs Mamonovs	1	2006	5	0	0	0	4		
Andrejs Maticins	1	2002	4	1	2	3	2		
Gints Meija	2	2010, 2022	8	0	1	1	4		
Aleksandrs Ņiživijs	3	2002, 2006, 2010	13	4	8	12	4		
Sandis Ozoliņš	3	2002, 2006, 2014	11	1	7	8	8	Team Captain (2014)	
Augusts Ozols	1	1936	0	0	0	0			
Patriks Ozols	1	2022	2	0	0	0			
Kārlis Paegle	1	1936	3	1	0	1	0		
Grigorijs Panteļejevs	2	2002, 2006	9	2	3	5	2		
Vitalijs Pavlovs	1	2014	5	0	1	1	0		
Arvīds Petersons	1	1936	3	1	0	1	0		
Ādolfs Petrovskis	1	1936	3	0	0	0	0		
Georgijs Pujacs	3	2006, 2010, 2014	14	0	2	2	4		
Anrī Ravinskis	1	2026	4	0	0	0	2		
Krišjānis Rēdlihs	3	2006, 2010, 2014	14	0	3	3	6		
Miķelis Rēdlihs	3	2006, 2010, 2014	14	2	1	3	12		
Arvīds Reķis	3	2006, 2010, 2014	14	0	0	0	20		
Jānis Rozītis	1	1936	1	0	0	0	0		
Kristiāns Rubīns	1	2026	4	0	0	0	2		
Agris Saviels	1	2006	5	0	0	0	8		
Nauris Sējējs	1	2022	1	0	0	0	0		
Aleksandrs Semjonovs	2	2002, 2006	9	1	1	2	6		
Sergejs Seņins	1	2002	4	0	1	1	4		
Aleksejs Širokovs	1	2010	4	0	0	0	2		
Kārlis Skrastiņš	3	2002, 2006, 2010	10	0	1	1	0	Team Captain (2006, 2010)	
Deniss Smirnovs	1	2022	4	0	1	1	2		
Oļegs Sorokins	1	2002	4	0	2	2	4		
Kristaps Sotnieks	2	2010, 2014	9	1	1	2	4		
Jānis Sprukts	2	2010, 2014	9	2	3	5	0		
Alberts Šmits	1	2026	4	0	2	2	2		
Juris Štāls	1	2014	3	0	0	0	0		
Leonids Tambijevs	2	2002, 2006	9	2	2	4	10		
Eduards Tralmaks	1	2026	4	3	1	4	6		
Atvars Tribuncovs	2	2002, 2006	9	2	1	3	18		
Herberts Vasiļjevs	3	2006, 2010, 2014	11	3	1	4	10		
Leonīds Vedējs	1	1936	3	0	0	0	0	Team Captain (1936)	
Sandis Vilmanis	1	2026	4	0	0	0	2		
Harijs Vītoliņš	1	2002	4	2	2	4	0	Team Captain (2002)	
Māris Ziediņš	1	2006	5	1	0	1	6		
Kristaps Zīle	2	2022, 2026	8	1	1	2	2		
