= Viktors Bļinovs =

Latvian ice hockey player (born 1981)

- Born: 26 June 1981 (age 44) Riga, Latvian SSR, Soviet Union
- Height: 5 ft 10 in (178 cm)
- Weight: 176 lb (80 kg; 12 st 8 lb)
- Position: Forward
- Shot: left
- PHL team Former teams: Berkut Kyiv; HK Pārdaugava Rīga; Rīgas Dinamo 81; HC Salamat; Sport Vaasa; Neman Grodno; HC Gomel; Dinamo Riga; HK Rīga 2000; Metallurg Zhlobin; Shakhter Soligorsk; HK Metalurgs Liepāja
- National team: Latvia
- Playing career: 1996–2013

Viktors Bļinovs (born 26 June 1981) is a Latvian ice hockey forward, currently playing for Berkut Kyiv of the Ukrainian Hockey League.

For the Latvian national ice hockey team he has played in three World Championships. During 2008-09 Bļinovs also played 24 games for the Kontinental Hockey League club Dinamo Riga.

== Career statistics ==
			Regular season					Playoffs
Season	Team	League	GP	G	A	Pts	PIM	GP	G	A	Pts	PIM
1996–97	Pardaugava Riga	Latvia	18	24	12	36	12	—	—	—	—	—
1997–98	HC Riga	EEHL	2	1	0	1	2	—	—	—	—	—
1997–98	Dinamo Riga 81	Latvia	—	9	16	25	—	—	—	—	—	—
1998–99	Dinamo Riga 81	Latvia	18	16	21	37	10	—	—	—	—	—
1999–00	Dinamo Riga 81	Latvia	12	16	15	31	0	—	—	—	—	—
1999–00	Dinamo Riga 81	EEHL B	14	12	8	20	6	—	—	—	—	—
2000–01	Metalurgs Liepaja	Latvia	22	17	19	36	—	—	—	—	—	—
2000–01	Metalurgs Liepaja	EEHL	30	10	8	18	—	—	—	—	—	—
2001–02	Metalurgs Liepaja	Latvia	19	11	14	25	2	3	4	5	9	0
2001–02	Metalurgs Liepaja	EEHL	43	17	10	27	41	—	—	—	—	—
2002–03	Metalurgs Liepaja	Latvia	—	8	12	20	8	—	—	—	—	—
2002–03	Metalurgs Liepaja	EEHL	32	10	7	17	18	—	—	—	—	—
2003–04	Metalurgs Liepaja	Latvia	16	9	11	20	18	4	0	0	0	2
2003–04	Metalurgs Liepaja	EEHL	28	5	9	14	26	—	—	—	—	—
2004–05	HC Salamat	Mestis	35	12	12	24	26	—	—	—	—	—
2005–06	Vaasan Sport	Mestis	44	12	18	30	40	11	2	2	4	6
2006–07	HC Neman Grodno	Belarus	41	18	12	30	68	1	0	1	1	0
2007–08	HK Gomel	Belarus	51	14	12	26	46	—	—	—	—	—
2008–09	Dinamo Riga	KHL	24	2	1	3	16	—	—	—	—	—
2008–09	Metallurg Zhlobin	Belarus	8	1	4	5	28	7	2	1	3	8
2008–09	HK Riga 2000	Belarus	16	6	12	18	30	—	—	—	—	—
2009–10	Metallurg Zhlobin	Belarus	52	20	30	50	54	—	—	—	—	—
2010–11	HC Shakhtyor Soligorsk	Belarus	9	2	2	4	8	—	—	—	—	—
2010–11	Metalurgs Liepaja	Belarus	31	11	26	37	24	3	2	1	3	2
2010–11	Metalurgs Liepaja-2	Latvia	10	7	11	18	8	8	7	9	16	6
2011–12	Metallurg Zhlobin	Belarus	3	0	0	0	0	—	—	—	—	—
2011–12	Berkut Kyiv	Ukraine	23	7	11	18	18	—	—	—	—	—
2012–13	HK Ozolnieki/Monarhs	Latvia	8	8	2	10	8	5	3	2	5	8
Latvia totals			123	125	133	258	66	20	14	16	30	16
EEHL totals			135	43	34	77	87	—	—	—	—	—
KHL totals			24	2	1	3	16	—	—	—	—	—
Belarus totals			211	71	98	170	258	11	4	3	7	10
Mestis totals			79	24	30	54	66	11	2	2	4	6
