= Vents Feldmanis =

Latvian ice hockey player (born 1977)

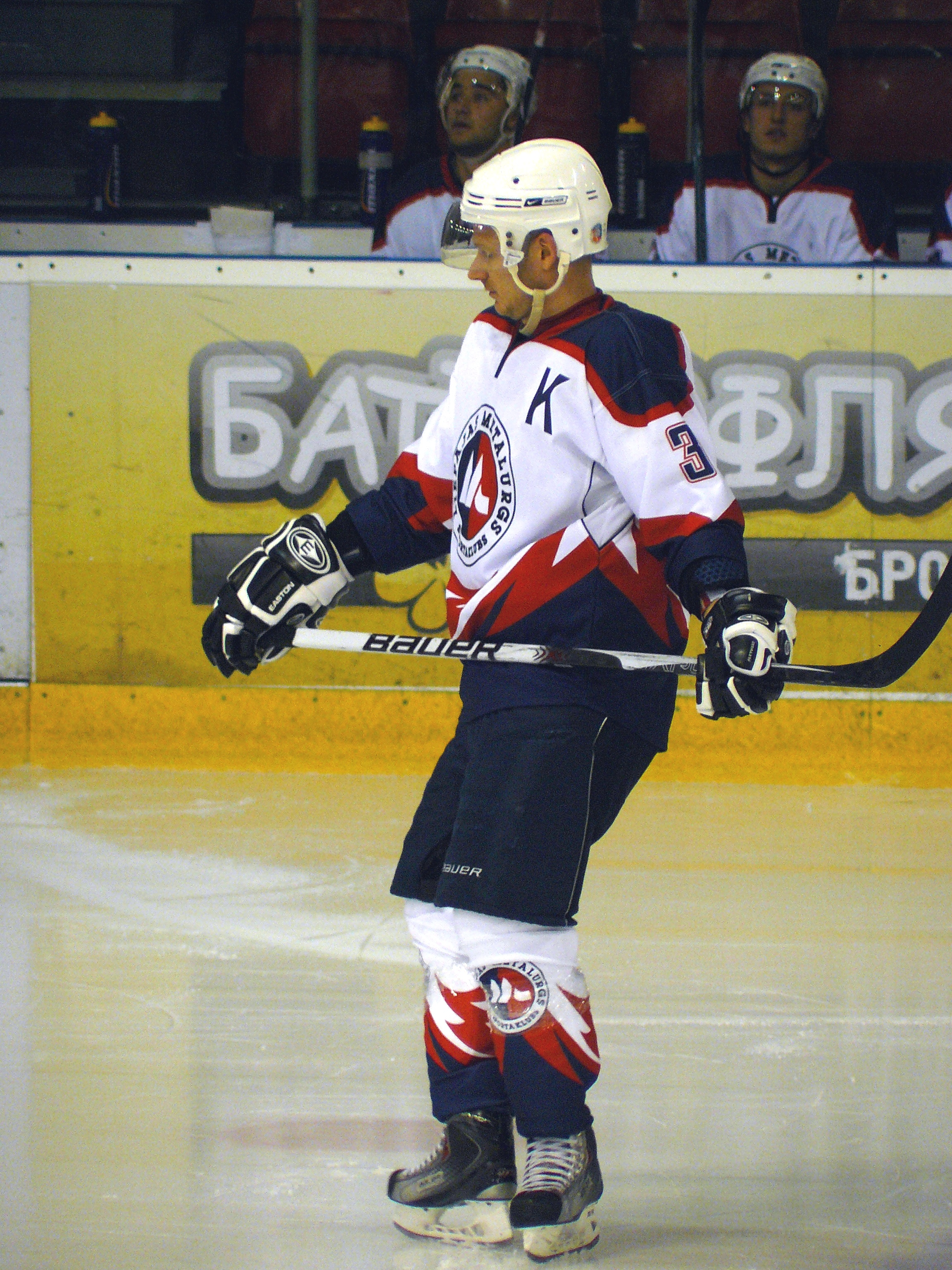
- Born: March 7, 1977 (age 48) Jūrmala, Latvian SSR, Soviet Union
- Height: 5 ft 10 in (178 cm)
- Weight: 183 lb (83 kg; 13 st 1 lb)
- Position: Defence
- Shot: left
- BOL team Former teams: HK Metalurgs Liepāja; Juniors Rīga; HK Essamika Ogre; UJK; Mörrum; Neman Grodno
- National team: Latvia
- Playing career: 1992–present

Vents Feldmanis (born March 7, 1977, in Jūrmala) is a Latvian ice hockey defenceman, currently playing for HK Metalurgs Liepāja of the Belarusian Extraleague. He has become one of the core players of the team, playing in it already since 1999.

He played for the Latvian national team at the 2003 World Championships.

== Career statistics ==
			Regular season					Playoffs
Season	Team	League	GP	G	A	Pts	PIM	GP	G	A	Pts	PIM
1992–93	Juniors Riga	Latvia	11	1	0	1	0	—	—	—	—	—
1993–94	NIK's Juniori Riga	Latvia	22	4	3	7	6	—	—	—	—	—
1994–95	NIK's Juniori Riga	Latvia	24	9	6	15	24	—	—	—	—	—
1995–96	Juniors Riga	EEHL	38	1	6	7	22	—	—	—	—	—
1995–96	Juniors Riga	Latvia	—	—	—	—	—	—	—	—	—	—
1996–97	Juniors Riga	EEHL	33	3	4	7	16	—	—	—	—	—
1996–97	Essamika Ogre	Latvia	19	4	10	14	28	—	—	—	—	—
1997–98	Juniors Essamika Riga	EEHL	44	9	8	17	18	—	—	—	—	—
1998–99	UJK	I-Divisioona	46	1	6	7	65	—	—	—	—	—
1999–00	Metalurgs Liepaja	EEHL	44	6	14	20	34	—	—	—	—	—
1999–00	Metalurgs Liepaja	Latvia	—	—	—	—	—	2	2	0	2	4
2000–01	Metallurg Novokuznetsk	Russia	7	0	2	2	4	—	—	—	—	—
2000–01	Metalurgs Liepaja	EEHL	8	0	4	4	—	—	—	—	—	—
2000–01	Metalurgs Liepaja	Latvia	12	5	9	14	—	—	—	—	—	—
2001–02	Mörrums GoIS IK	HockeyAllsvenskan	3	0	0	0	2	—	—	—	—	—
2001–02	Metalurgs Liepaja	EEHL	36	9	9	18	75	—	—	—	—	—
2001–02	Metalurgs Liepaja	Latvia	14	4	7	11	34	3	2	3	5	0
2002–03	Metalurgs Liepaja	EEHL	36	5	13	18	8	—	—	—	—	—
2002–03	Metalurgs Liepaja	Latvia	—	15	27	42	41	—	—	—	—	—
2003–04	Metalurgs Liepaja	EEHL	31	10	14	24	63	—	—	—	—	—
2003–04	Metalurgs Liepaja	Latvia	19	21	23	44	26	5	4	4	8	8
2004–05	Metalurgs Liepaja	Belarus	42	3	21	24	20	4	0	0	0	4
2004–05	Metalurgs Liepaja	Latvia	11	5	12	17	6	6	2	4	6	2
2005–06	Metalurgs Liepaja	Latvia	54	8	21	29	40	—	—	—	—	—
2005–06	Metalurgs Liepaja	Latvia	—	2	7	9	8	—	—	—	—	—
2006–07	HK Neman Grodno	Belarus	47	9	15	24	34	2	0	0	0	4
2007–08	Metalurgs Liepaja	Latvia	42	16	20	36	97	5	0	4	4	2
2008–09	Metalurgs Liepaja	Belarus	52	11	24	35	76	—	—	—	—	—
2008–09	Metalurgs Liepaja	Latvia	—	—	—	—	—	13	5	4	9	47
2009–10	Metalurgs Liepaja	Belarus	50	13	17	30	68	—	—	—	—	—
2009–10	Metalurgs Liepaja	Latvia	—	—	—	—	—	8	3	3	6	8
2010–11	Metalurgs Liepaja	Belarus	55	3	21	24	70	3	0	1	1	6
2010–11	Metalurgs Liepaja-2	Latvia	10	1	9	10	6	8	0	6	6	4
2011–12	Metalurgs Liepaja	Belarus	50	7	11	18	54	4	0	1	1	8
2012–13	Metalurgs Liepaja	Belarus	45	3	6	9	59	2	0	0	0	4
Belarus totals			395	57	136	193	421	15	0	2	2	26
EEHL totals			270	43	72	115	236	—	—	—	—	—
