= Vladimirs Mamonovs =

Latvian professional ice hockey player (born 1980)

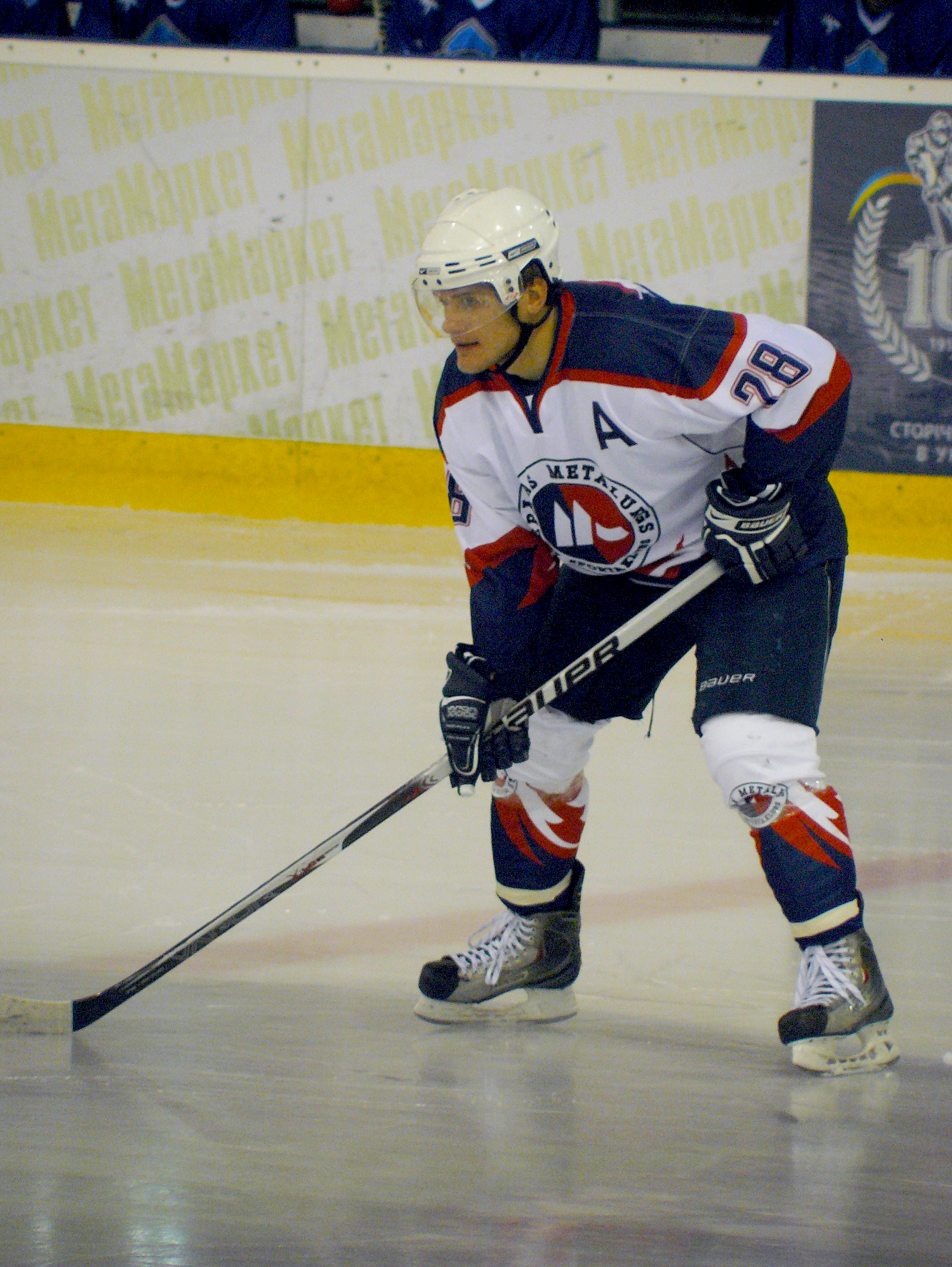
- Born: April 22, 1980 (age 44); Riga, Latvian SSR, Soviet Union
- Height: 5 ft 10 in (178 cm)
- Weight: 190 lb (86 kg; 13 st 8 lb)
- Position: Left wing
- Shoots: Right
- KAZ team: Sary-Arka Karaganda
- National team: Latvia
- Playing career: 1997–present

Vladimirs Mamonovs (born April 22, 1980 in Riga, Latvian SSR, Soviet Union) is a Latvian professional ice hockey player. He plays Left wing. He currently plays for Sary-Arka Karaganda of the Kazakhstani Championship.

== Career statistics ==
=== Regular season and playoffs ===
			Regular season					Playoffs
Season	Team	League	GP	G	A	Pts	PIM	GP	G	A	Pts	PIM
1996–97	LB/Essamika	LAT	17	2	10	12	2	—	—	—	—	—
1997–98	HK Rīga	EEHL	47	15	10	25	32	—	—	—	—	—
1998–99	HK Liepājas Metalurgs	EEHL	28	3	6	9	28	—	—	—	—	—
1999–2000	HK Liepājas Metalurgs	EEHL	11	0	1	1	6	—	—	—	—	—
1999–2000	HK Liepājas Metalurgs	LAT	—	—	—	—	—	2	0	0	0	0
2000–01	HK Rīga 2000	EEHL	31	11	8	19		—	—	—	—	—
2000–01	HK Rīga 2000	LAT	21	17	11	28		—	—	—	—	—
2001–02	HK Rīga 2000	EEHL	33	9	8	17	26	—	—	—	—	—
2001–02	HK Rīga 2000	LAT	14	9	9	18	14	3	2	1	3	0
2001–02	HK Prizma Rīga	EEHL B	5	1	2	3	8	—	—	—	—	—
2002–03	HK Rīga 2000	EEHL	27	9	6	15	16	—	—	—	—	—
2002–03	HK Rīga 2000	LAT		13	11	24	37	—	—	—	—	—
2003–04	HK Liepājas Metalurgs	EEHL	29	8	6	14	24	—	—	—	—	—
2003–04	HK Liepājas Metalurgs	LAT	18	5	10	15	8	8	5	4	9	6
2004–05	HK Liepājas Metalurgs	BLR	32	2	6	8	12	—	—	—	—	—
2004–05	HK Liepājas Metalurgs	LAT	18	15	18	33	0	6	3	5	8	0
2005–06	HK Liepājas Metalurgs	BLR	48	14	14	28	69	—	—	—	—	—
2005–06	HK Liepājas Metalurgs	LAT		7	12	19	4	—	—	—	—	—
2006–07	Wölfe Freiburg	DEU.3	42	28	23	51	65	4	1	1	2	2
2007–08	HK Liepājas Metalurgs	LAT	41	20	15	35	63	5	2	3	5	4
2008–09	HK Liepājas Metalurgs	BLR	42	12	14	26	48	—	—	—	—	—
2008–09	HK Liepājas Metalurgs	LAT	—	—	—	—	—		4	9	13
2009–10	HK Liepājas Metalurgs	BLR	42	9	20	29	32	—	—	—	—	—
2010–11	HK Liepājas Metalurgs	BLR	53	22	19	41	56	3	1	1	2	6
2010–11	HK Liepājas–2 Metalurgs	LAT	10	7	9	16	10		6	9	15
2011–12	Saryarka Karagandy	KAZ	24	7	10	17	22	—	—	—	—	—
2011–12	Arlan Kokshetau	KAZ	18	2	5	7	24	3	1	0	1	0
2012–13	HK SMScredit	LAT	19	19	19	38	26	—	—	—	—	—
2012–13	HC Nové Zámky	MOL	15	11	9	20	32	3	1	1	2	4
2013–14	Beibarys Atyrau	KAZ	34	14	7	21	28	9	3	3	6	6
2014–15	HK Mogo	LAT	29	18	29	47	14	10	5	7	12	20
2015–16	HC Nové Zámky	SVK.2	21	1	11	12	4	—	—	—	—	—
2015–16	HK Mogo	LAT	11	6	8	14	22	8	4	1	5	18
2016–17	HK Mogo	LAT	30	7	20	27	22	11	1	2	3	10
2017–18	HK Mogo	LAT	22	12	8	20	10	6	1	0	1	4
2018–19	HK Mogo	LAT	31	17	9	26	34	10	0	4	4	8
2019–20	HK Mogo	LAT	29	8	5	13	16	—	—	—	—	—
2020–21	HK Mogo/LSPA	LAT	28	4	6	10	22	4	0	0	0	0
2021–22	HK Mogo/LSPA	LAT	20	9	5	14	33	4	0	0	0	27
LAT totals			376	172	188	360	308	77	23	27	50	97
EEHL totals			206	55	45	100	132	—	—	—	—	—
BLR totals			217	59	73	132	217	6	1	1	2	6

- LAT totals do not include numbers from the 2002–03, 2005–06, 2008–09 and 2010–11 seasons.

=== International ===
Year	Team	Event	GP	G	A	Pts	PIM
1997	Latvia	EJC C	4	4	1	5	2
1998	Latvia	EJC C	4	3	1	4	6
1999	Latvia	WJC B	6	2	1	3	12
2000	Latvia	WJC B	5	1	1	2	10
2006	Latvia	OG	5	0	0	0	4
Junior totals			19	10	4	14	30
Senior totals			5	0	0	0	4
