= Georgijs Pujacs =

Latvian ice hockey defenceman (born 1981)

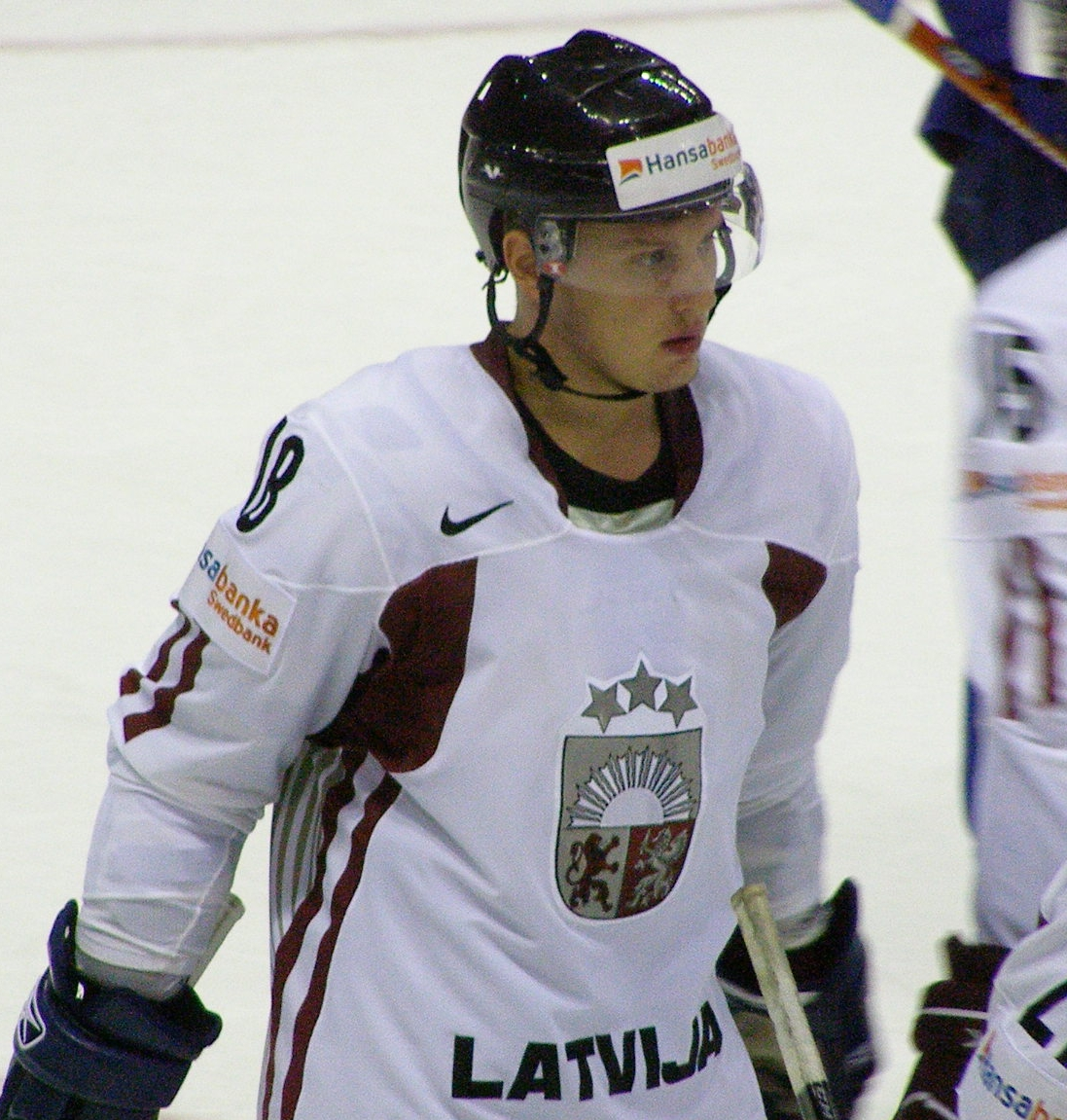
- Born: 11 June 1981 (age 44) Riga, Soviet Union
- Height: 6 ft 0 in (183 cm)
- Weight: 216 lb (98 kg; 15 st 6 lb)
- Position: Defence
- Shoots: Left
- Unibet Hokiliiga team Former teams: HK Välk 494 Tartu; Atlant Moscow Oblast; HC Dinamo Minsk; Lada Togliatti; Dinamo Riga; Sibir Novosibirsk; Avangard Omsk; HC Neftekhimik NizhnekamskDresdner Eislöwen
- National team: Latvia
- NHL draft: 264th overall, 1999; Boston Bruins
- Playing career: 1996–present

Georgijs Pujacs (born 11 June 1981 in Riga, Soviet Union) is a Latvian ice hockey defenceman who currently plays for Unibet Hokiliiga team HK Välk 494 Tartu.

== Playing career ==
Pujacs was drafted by Boston Bruins as the 264th pick in the 1999 NHL entry draft, after a strong performance in 1999 Division 1 European Junior Championships. After being drafted, he played minor league ice hockey in North America for a year but did not reach the NHL. He then returned to Latvia and has mostly played for Latvian teams in the Latvian League and Eastern European Hockey League. In July 2006, Pujacs signed a two-year contract with Khimik Moscow Oblast of Russian Elite League, then joined HC Lada Togliatti on 6 November 2007. On 14 January 2009, Pujacs returned to Latvia and signed with Dinamo Riga of the KHL and left on 13 July 2009 to sign with Dinamo Riga's rival HC Sibir Novosibirsk.

== Career statistics ==
=== Regular season and playoffs ===
			Regular season					Playoffs
Season	Team	League	GP	G	A	Pts	PIM	GP	G	A	Pts	PIM
1996–97	Pārdaugava Rīga	LAT	19	1	5	6	10	—	—	—	—	—
1997–98	HK Rīga	EEHL	2	0	0	0	0	—	—	—	—	—
1998–99	Dinamo 81 Rīga	LAT	17	2	9	11	20	—	—	—	—	—
1999–2000	Rochester Mustangs	USHL	50	4	13	17	35	—	—	—	—	—
1999–2000	Anchorage Aces	WCHL	8	0	0	0	4	—	—	—	—	—
2000–01	HK Liepājas Metalurgs	EEHL	15	0	4	4		—	—	—	—	—
2000–01	HK Liepājas Metalurgs	LAT	18	4	8	12		—	—	—	—	—
2000–01	Vilki OP	LAT	6	0	1	1		—	—	—	—	—
2001–02	HK Liepājas Metalurgs	EEHL	41	7	11	18	27	—	—	—	—	—
2001–02	HK Liepājas Metalurgs	LAT	18	2	1	3	8	3	1	2	3	0
2002–03	HK Liepājas Metalurgs	EEHL	36	1	7	8	22	—	—	—	—	—
2002–03	HK Liepājas Metalurgs	LAT		2	14	16	12	—	—	—	—	—
2003–04	Örebro HK	Allsv	42	6	4	10	64	10	3	2	5	4
2004–05	Vilki OP	LAT	1	0	0	0	0	—	—	—	—	—
2004–05	Elmira Jackals	UHL	71	7	21	28	30	—	—	—	—	—
2005–06	HK Rīga 2000	BLR	46	4	10	14	42	6	2	2	4	39
2005–06	HK Rīga 2000	LAT		1	1	2	6	—	—	—	—	—
2006–07	Khimik Mytishchi	RSL	49	1	9	10	42	6	0	0	0	2
2006–07	Khimik–2 Mytishchi	RUS.3	1	2	0	2	2	—	—	—	—	—
2007–08	Dinamo Minsk	BLR	18	2	7	9	24	—	—	—	—	—
2007–08	Lada Togliatti	RSL	33	1	4	5	28	4	0	0	0	0
2008–09	Lada Togliatti	KHL	38	9	4	13	49	—	—	—	—	—
2008–09	Dinamo Rīga	KHL	12	1	3	4	4	3	0	1	1	2
2009–10	Sibir Novosibirsk	KHL	56	1	13	14	26	—	—	—	—	—
2010–11	Sibir Novosibirsk	KHL	49	8	14	22	52	4	0	0	0	4
2011–12	Sibir Novosibirsk	KHL	25	1	4	5	14	—	—	—	—	—
2011–12	Avangard Omsk	KHL	13	1	4	5	2	17	0	0	0	4
2012–13	Avangard Omsk	KHL	45	1	12	13	28	10	0	2	2	2
2013–14	Dinamo Rīga	KHL	43	1	5	6	55	7	0	2	2	16
2014–15	Dinamo Rīga	KHL	32	1	1	2	24	—	—	—	—	—
2014–15	Neftekhimik Nizhnekamsk	KHL	17	1	3	4	22	—	—	—	—	—
2015–16	Neftekhimik Nizhnekamsk	KHL	5	0	1	1	6	—	—	—	—	—
2015–16	HC ’05 iClinic Banská Bystrica	SVK	14	0	6	6	16	15	0	2	2	4
2016–17	Dinamo Rīga	KHL	24	2	5	7	16	—	—	—	—	—
2017–18	Dinamo Rīga	KHL	34	2	2	4	18	—	—	—	—	—
2018–19	HK Prizma Rīga	LAT	6	2	2	4	6	—	—	—	—	—
2018–19	Dresdner Eislöwen	GER.2	46	6	11	17	24	12	0	2	2	10
2019–20	HK Olimp	LAT	35	6	11	17	24	—	—	—	—	—
2020–21	HK Olimp/Venta 2002	LAT	35	10	17	27	26	9	3	4	7	4
2021–22	HK Olimp/Venta 2002	LAT	29	5	15	20	26	10	1	1	2	6
KHL totals			393	29	71	100	316	41	0	5	5	28

=== International ===
Year	Team	Event	GP	G	A	Pts	PIM
1997	Latvia	EJC C	3	1	0	1	2
1998	Latvia	EJC C	4	1	1	2	8
1999	Latvia	EJC D1	4	0	3	3	2
2000	Latvia	WJC B	5	0	1	1	6
2006	Latvia	OG	5	0	0	0	0
2006	Latvia	WC	6	0	0	0	18
2007	Latvia	WC	5	0	0	0	4
2008	Latvia	WC	6	0	1	1	6
2009	Latvia	OGQ	3	0	0	0	14
2009	Latvia	WC	7	0	0	0	10
2010	Latvia	OG	4	0	1	1	2
2010	Latvia	WC	6	1	2	3	2
2011	Latvia	WC	6	2	1	3	33
2012	Latvia	WC	7	0	1	1	2
2013	Latvia	OGQ	3	1	0	1	0
2013	Latvia	WC	2	0	0	0	2
2014	Latvia	OG	5	0	1	1	2
2014	Latvia	WC	7	1	1	2	4
2016	Latvia	OGQ	3	0	0	0	2
Junior totals			16	2	5	7	18
Senior totals			75	5	8	13	101
