= Krišjānis Rēdlihs =

Latvian ice hockey player

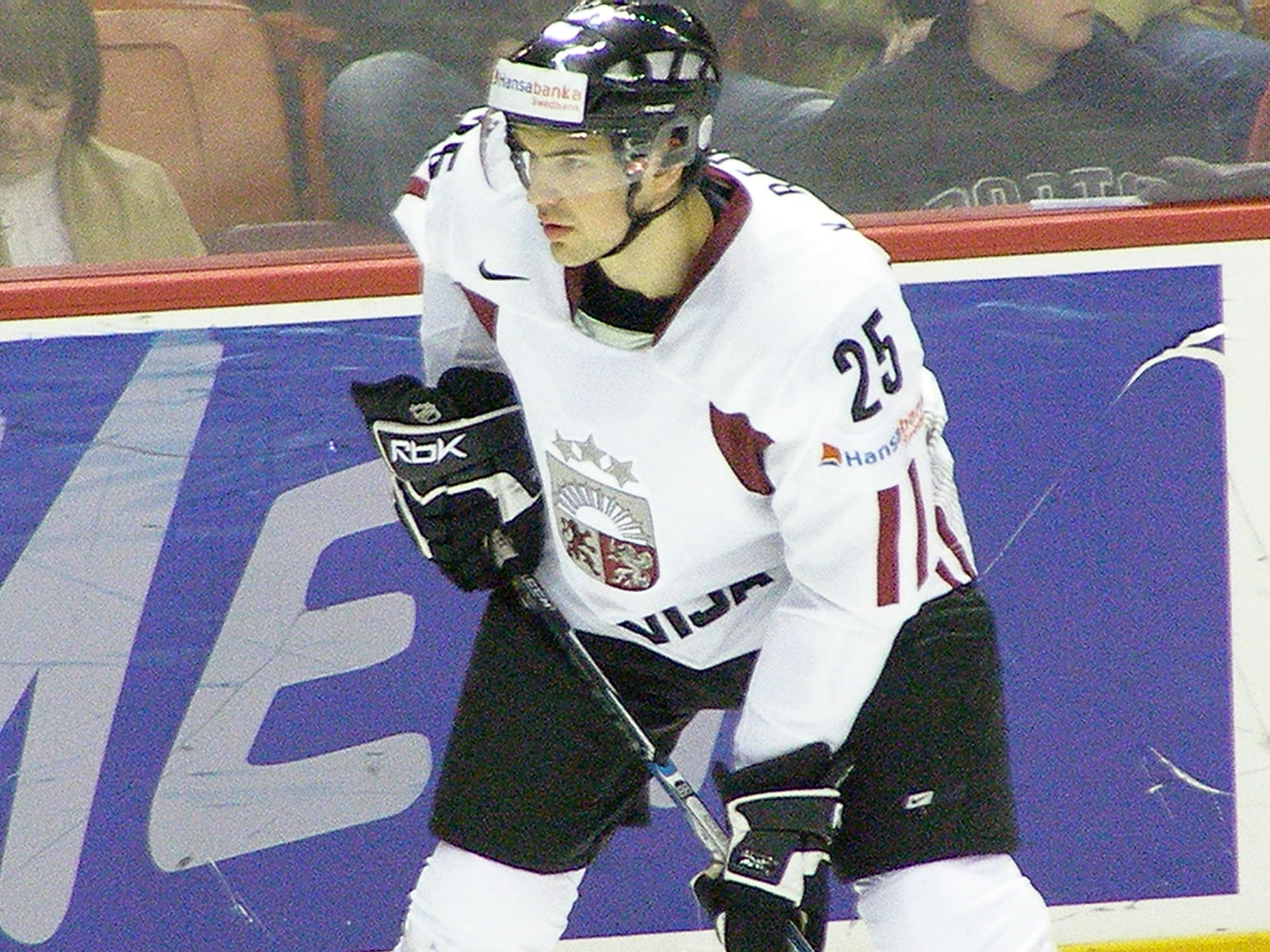
- Born: 15 January 1981 (age 45) Riga, Latvian SSR, Soviet Union
- Height: 6 ft 2 in (188 cm)
- Weight: 205 lb (93 kg; 14 st 9 lb)
- Position: Defence
- Shot: Left
- Played for: HK Liepājas Metalurgs; Albany River Rats; Fribourg-Gottéron; Amur Khabarovsk; Linköping HC; Hamburg Freezers; Dinamo Riga; Kunlun Red Star
- National team: Latvia
- NHL draft: 154th overall, 2002; New Jersey Devils
- Playing career: 1998–2026

Krišjānis Rēdlihs (born 15 January 1981) is a Latvian former professional ice hockey defenceman.

== Playing career ==
Krišjānis Rēdlihs started his playing career by playing for HK Liepājas Metalurgs in the Latvian hockey league and Eastern European Hockey League. In 2002, he unexpectedly made the Latvia men's national ice hockey team for 2002 Ice Hockey World Championships. Following the World Championships, Rēdlihs was drafted in 2002 NHL entry draft by New Jersey Devils, in the 5th round, 154th overall. He has played for Albany River Rats, the AHL affiliate of New Jersey Devils since then. In 2006, Rēdlihs was briefly called up from Albany to New Jersey Devils but did not play for Devils. He has played for Latvian national team in three World Championships and 2006 Winter Olympics.

== Personal ==
Krišjānis Rēdlihs has three brothers - two of them are also professional hockey players - Jēkabs Rēdlihs and Miķelis Rēdlihs.

== Career statistics ==
=== Regular season and playoffs ===
			Regular season					Playoffs
Season	Team	League	GP	G	A	Pts	PIM	GP	G	A	Pts	PIM
1998–99	Dinamo Rīga 81	Latvia	—	—	—	—	—	—	—	—	—	—
1999–2000	HK Liepājas Metalurgs	EEHL	12	1	3	4	0	—	—	—	—	—
1999–2000	HK Liepājas Metalurgs	Latvia	—	—	—	—	—	2	0	0	0	0
2000–01	HK Liepājas Metalurgs	Latvia	22	1	6	7	—	—	—	—	—	—
2000–01	HK Liepājas Metalurgs	EEHL	27	2	2	4	—	—	—	—	—	—
2000–01	HK Liepājas Metalurgs	EEHL	41	1	2	3	18	—	—	—	—	—
2001–02	HK Liepājas Metalurgs	Latvia	17	0	8	8	6	3	2	2	4	0
2002–03	Albany River Rats	AHL	61	1	9	10	20	—	—	—	—	—
2003–04	Albany River Rats	AHL	66	9	10	19	16	—	—	—	—	—
2004–05	Albany River Rats	AHL	46	0	10	10	12	—	—	—	—	—
2005–06	Albany River Rats	AHL	66	3	21	24	30	—	—	—	—	—
2006–07	HC Fribourg–Gottéron	NLA	15	5	1	6	30	—	—	—	—	—
2006–07	Amur Khabarovsk	RSL	29	1	4	5	18	—	—	—	—	—
2007–08	Linköpings HC	SEL	9	0	0	0	0	—	—	—	—	—
2007–08	Hamburg Freezers	DEL	43	2	6	8	18	8	0	1	1	6
2008–09	Dinamo Rīga	KHL	24	4	6	10	16	3	0	0	0	0
2009–10	Dinamo Rīga	KHL	40	2	8	10	26	8	1	1	2	4
2010–11	Dinamo Rīga	KHL	32	3	7	10	12	11	1	0	1	2
2011–12	Dinamo Rīga	KHL	50	5	16	21	14	7	1	2	2	0
2012–13	Dinamo Rīga	KHL	45	5	15	20	10	—	—	—	—	—
2013–14	Dinamo Rīga	KHL	45	5	2	7	16	7	0	2	2	0
2014–15	Dinamo Rīga	KHL	54	4	17	21	22	—	—	—	—	—
2015–16	Dinamo Rīga	KHL	45	2	6	8	47	—	—	—	—	—
2016–17	Dinamo Rīga	KHL	44	3	10	13	12	—	—	—	—	—
2017–18	Dinamo Rīga	KHL	39	1	8	9	24	—	—	—	—	—
2018–19	HK Kurbads	Latvia	5	2	4	6	2	—	—	—	—	—
2018–19	Kunlun Red Star	KHL	12	0	1	1	4	—	—	—	—	—
2019–20	HK Kurbads	Latvia	35	8	21	29	12	—	—	—	—	—
2020–21	HK Mogo/LSPA	Latvia	34	3	10	13	22	3	1	0	1	2
2021–22	HK Mogo/LSPA	Latvia	35	7	20	27	8	6	0	2	2	0
AHL totals			239	13	40	53	78	—	—	—	—	—
KHL totals			425	34	96	130	203	36	3	4	7	6

=== International ===
Year	Team	Event	GP	G	A	Pts	PIM
1999	Latvia	EJC D1	4	1	3	4	0
2002	Latvia	WC	6	0	1	1	0
2003	Latvia	WC	6	0	0	0	2
2004	Latvia	WC	7	0	0	0	2
2006	Latvia	OG	5	0	0	0	2
2008	Latvia	WC	6	0	0	0	10
2009	Latvia	OGQ	3	0	2	2	0
2009	Latvia	WC	7	1	0	1	2
2010	Latvia	OG	4	1	0	1	2
2011	Latvia	WC	4	1	0	1	2
2012	Latvia	WC	7	1	0	1	0
2013	Latvia	OGQ	3	0	0	0	0
2013	Latvia	WC	7	0	0	0	0
2014	Latvia	OG	5	0	2	2	2
2015	Latvia	WC	7	0	1	1	4
2016	Latvia	OGQ	3	0	3	3	2
Junior totals			4	3	1	4	0
Senior totals			80	3	10	13	30
