= Mārtiņš Karsums =

Latvian professional ice hockey player (born 1986)

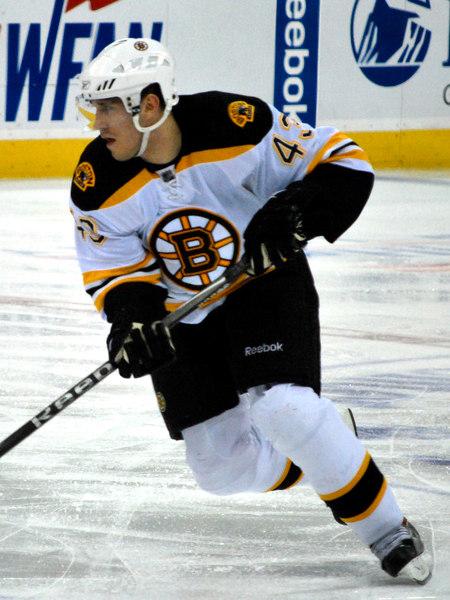
- Karsums with the Boston Bruins in 2009
- Born: 26 February 1986 (age 40) Riga, Latvian SSR, Soviet Union
- Height: 5 ft 10 in (178 cm)
- Weight: 216 lb (98 kg; 15 st 6 lb)
- Position: Winger
- Shoots: Right
- Slovak team Former teams: MHk 32 Liptovský Mikuláš; Boston Bruins; Tampa Bay Lightning; Dinamo Riga; Dynamo Moscow; Spartak Moscow; Krefeld Pinguine
- National team: Latvia
- NHL draft: 64th overall, 2004; Boston Bruins
- Playing career: 2000–present

Mārtiņš Karsums (born 26 February 1986) is a Latvian professional ice hockey player who is a winger for MHk 32 Liptovský Mikuláš of the Slovak Extraliga.

Karsums was selected in the second round, 64th overall, in the 2004 NHL entry draft by the Boston Bruins. He has played in the National Hockey League for the Bruins and the Tampa Bay Lightning.

== Playing career ==
=== Early career ===
Karsums first appeared on scouts' radar with his appearances at the Division I U18 and 2003 World Junior Ice Hockey Championship tournaments in 2003, representing Latvia. Karsums scored twice in the U18 tournament and showed another side of his game in the 2003 World Junior Ice Hockey Championship event when he tallied 35 PIM in just five games.

=== North America ===
==== Junior league ====
Unhappy with his limited play at the Latvian club team Vilki Rīga, Karsums elected to transfer to the Moncton Wildcats of the QMJHL. He enjoyed a very good rookie season for the Moncton Wildcats, finishing in the top five of both team and league rookie, scoring 53 points (30 goals, 23 assists), and accumulating 76 PIM. Karsums also dominated the 2004 World Junior Ice Hockey Championship Division I tournament, scoring seven goals and adding six assists for 13 points in five games.

Karsums had problems with injury that limited his play with Moncton for the 2004-05 season, but he still managed to be productive. In 30 games, he scored 26 points (14 goals, 12 assists) and had 31 penalty minutes.

During the 2005–06 season, which was his most successful season so far, Karsums scored 65 points (34 goals, 31 assists) and helped his Moncton Wildcats to win the Jean Rougeau Trophy and the President's Cup. He also received the Guy Lafleur Trophy as playoff most valuable player, scoring 27 points (16 goals, 11 assists) in 22 games and was the first European-born player to do so. Eight of his 16 post-season goals have proven game-winning goals, including three of the four game-winners in the championships series vs the Quebec Remparts.

He played in the 2006 Memorial Cup, scored one goal, and had three assists in five games.

==== Professional leagues ====
On May 22, 2006, Karsums signed a three-year contract with Boston Bruins. He spent the majority of that time playing for the Providence Bruins of the American Hockey League (AHL), the top farm team of the Bruins. In his most successful 2007/08 season with Providence, Karsums scored 20 goals and had 63 points in 79 games.

On December 13, 2008, Karsums debuted in NHL with the Boston Bruins against Atlanta Thrashers in a 4–2 win. On March 4, 2009, on the NHL Trade Deadline, he was traded by the Bruins, along with Matt Lashoff, to the Tampa Bay Lightning in exchange for Mark Recchi. While playing for the Lightning, Karsums scored his first career NHL goal on April 3, 2009, against the New Jersey Devils' Martin Brodeur.

=== Return to Europe ===
On January 14, 2010, after playing the first half of the season with affiliate, the Norfolk Admirals of the AHL, Karsums was reassigned by the Lightning to HC MVD of the Kontinental Hockey League. However, he didn't join the team and was instead loaned to Dinamo Riga.

After struggling in the first season, he became a major contributor and one of the scoring and on-ice leaders in his next three seasons with Dinamo Riga. He played at least 50 games in all three seasons finishing above 30 points. Mid-through 2012–13 season Karsums was named as captain of the team.

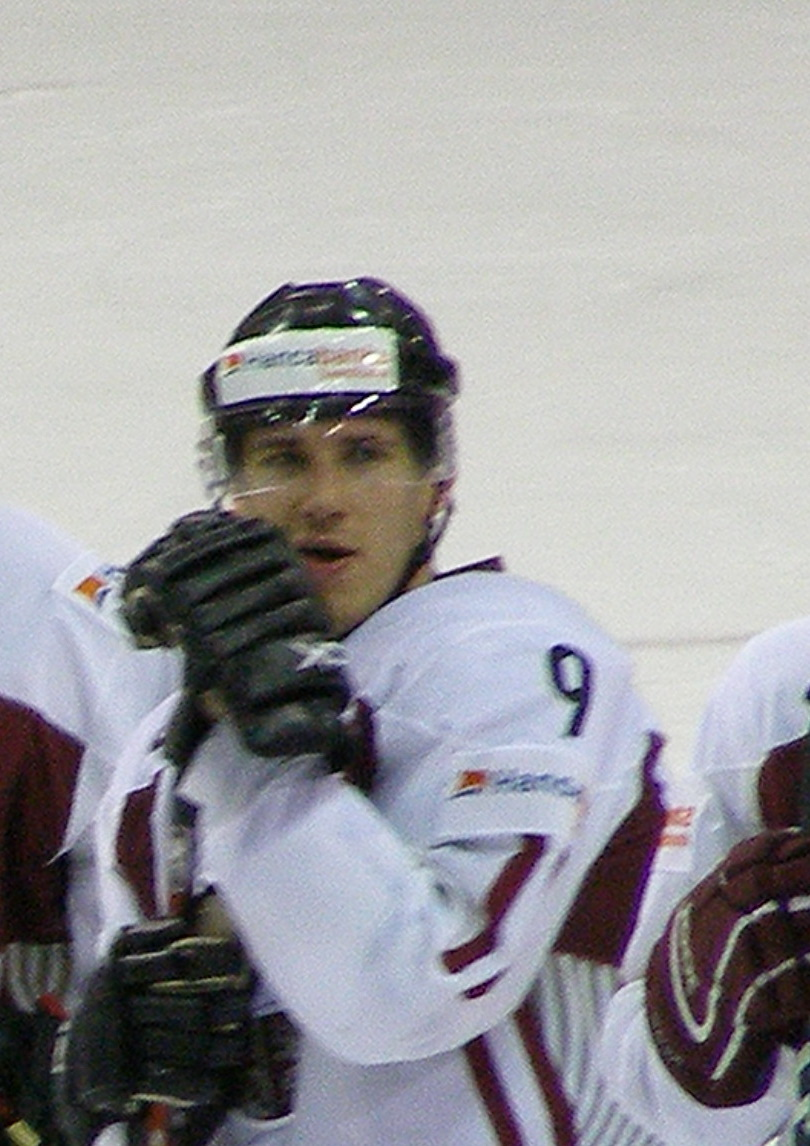
Karsums with the Latvian national team in 2008.

After four seasons with Dinamo Rīga, Karsums signed a contract with HC Dynamo Moscow.

Following the 2017–18 season, his fifth with Dynamo, Karsums left the club as a free agent and agreed to a one-year deal to continue in the KHL with HC Spartak Moscow on May 4, 2018.

Karsums played 11 seasons in the KHL before moving to Germany and agreeing to a one-year contract with Krefeld Pinguine of the DEL for the pandemic delayed 2020–21 season on 22 December 2020.

After a lone season with Krefeld, Karsums opted to return for a second stint with Dinamo Riga of the KHL on 8 May 2021.

== International play ==
Karsums debuted internationally at the junior level with Latvia at the 2001 IIHF World U18 Championships. At the Division I 2004 World Junior Championships, Karsums helped Latvia claim the bronze medal, leading the tournament in scoring with 13 points in 7 games. He later claimed the Gold medal and promotion to the top tier at the 2005 World Junior Ice Hockey Championships. (D1-B)

On May 11, 2008, Karsums debuted for Latvia against Norway in a 4–1 win, earning his first career international point, an assist. Since then Karsums has played in three World Championships. He missed 2011, 2012 and 2013 championships due to injuries. Karsums scored crucial game tying goal against France in 2014 Winter Olympics qualifications 3:2 OT loss, that allowed Latvian national team to qualify for 5th Olympic games, and 4th in a row.

== Career statistics ==
=== Regular season and playoffs ===
			Regular season					Playoffs
Season	Team	League	GP	G	A	Pts	PIM	GP	G	A	Pts	PIM
2000–01	LB Prizma Rīga	LAT	2	0	0	0	0	—	—	—	—	—
2000–01	HK Lido Nafta Rīga	LAT	18	8	6	14	—	—	—	—	—	—
2001–02	LB Prizma Rīga	EEHL B	16	7	8	15	4	—	—	—	—	—
2001–02	LB Prizma Rīga	LAT	6	4	1	5	4	—	—	—	—	—
2001–02	New York Apple Core	EJHL	20	12	7	19	—	—	—	—	—	—
2002–03	HK Rīga 2000	EEHL	2	0	0	0	0	—	—	—	—	—
2002–03	HK Prizma Rīga	EEHL B	10	5	8	13	28	—	—	—	—	—
2002–03	Vilki OP	LAT	11	5	3	8	12	5	2	1	3	2
2003–04	Moncton Wildcats	QMJHL	60	30	23	53	76	20	8	9	17	14
2004–05	Moncton Wildcats	QMJHL	30	14	12	26	31	2	0	0	0	0
2005–06	Moncton Wildcats	QMJHL	49	34	31	65	89	22	16	11	27	22
2006–07	Providence Bruins	AHL	54	13	22	35	41	12	3	1	4	2
2007–08	Providence Bruins	AHL	79	20	43	63	57	10	7	3	10	6
2008–09	Providence Bruins	AHL	43	17	24	41	20	—	—	—	—	—
2008–09	Boston Bruins	NHL	6	0	1	1	0	—	—	—	—	—
2008–09	Tampa Bay Lightning	NHL	18	1	4	5	6	—	—	—	—	—
2009–10	Norfolk Admirals	AHL	36	4	12	16	6	—	—	—	—	—
2009–10	Dinamo Rīga	KHL	12	4	4	8	16	9	2	1	3	4
2010–11	Dinamo Rīga	KHL	52	17	15	32	46	11	1	2	3	8
2011–12	Dinamo Rīga	KHL	54	21	12	33	46	7	1	4	5	0
2012–13	Dinamo Rīga	KHL	51	16	19	35	63	—	—	—	—	—
2013–14	Dynamo Moscow	KHL	42	17	8	25	83	5	0	0	0	0
2014–15	Dynamo Moscow	KHL	56	11	14	25	18	11	3	2	5	4
2015–16	Dynamo Moscow	KHL	34	10	8	18	14	—	—	—	—	—
2016–17	Dynamo Moscow	KHL	52	16	18	34	57	10	0	1	1	10
2017–18	Dynamo Moscow	KHL	34	3	12	15	57	—	—	—	—	—
2018–19	Spartak Moscow	KHL	56	9	15	24	46	6	2	2	4	2
2019–20	Spartak Moscow	KHL	52	11	11	22	65	6	0	1	1	4
2020–21	Krefeld Pinguine	DEL	25	3	7	10	12	—	—	—	—	—
2021–22	Dinamo Rīga	KHL	28	4	3	7	4	—	—	—	—	—
NHL totals			24	1	5	6	6	—	—	—	—	—
KHL totals			523	139	139	278	515	65	9	13	22	32

=== International ===
Year	Team	Event	GP	G	A	Pts	PIM
2001	Latvia	WJC18 D1	5	0	0	0	25
2002	Latvia	WJC18 D1	5	1	0	1	14
2003	Latvia	WJC D1	5	0	1	1	35
2003	Latvia	WJC18 D1	4	2	0	2	14
2004	Latvia	WJC D1	5	7	6	13	22
2005	Latvia	WJC D1	5	7	3	10	20
2006	Latvia	WJC	6	3	3	6	6
2008	Latvia	WC	2	1	2	3	2
2009	Latvia	OGQ	3	4	2	6	0
2009	Latvia	WC	6	1	3	4	27
2010	Latvia	OG	4	0	2	2	2
2010	Latvia	WC	6	3	1	4	2
2013	Latvia	OGQ	3	1	1	2	0
2014	Latvia	OG	5	0	1	1	2
2016	Latvia	OGQ	3	2	1	3	0
2018	Latvia	WC	3	0	2	2	0
2021	Latvia	WC	7	2	0	2	0
Junior totals			35	20	13	33	136
Senior totals			42	14	15	29	35

== Awards and honours ==
Award	Year
QMJHL
All-Rookie Team	2004
President's Cup	2006
Guy Lafleur Trophy	2006
AHL
All-Star Game	2009
