= Miķelis Rēdlihs =

Latvian professional ice hockey forward (born 1984)

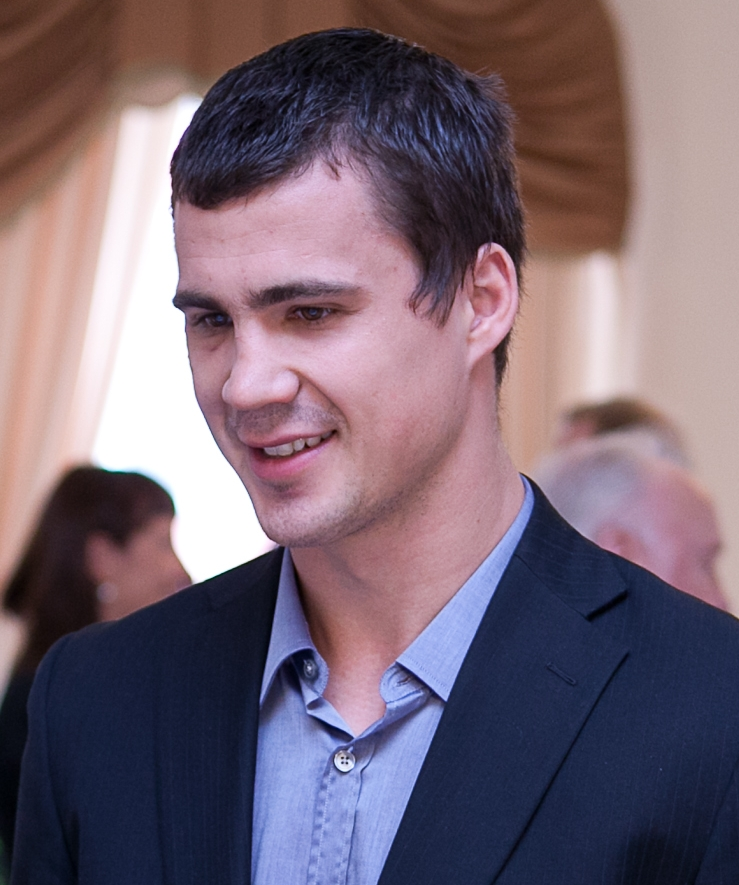
- Born: July 1, 1984 (age 42) Riga, Soviet Union
- Height: 5 ft 11 in (180 cm)
- Weight: 172 lb (78 kg; 12 st 4 lb)
- Position: Right wing
- Shot: Left
- Played for: HK Riga 2000; IF Björklöven; Junost Minsk; Metallurg Zhlobin; Dinamo Riga; Lokomotiv Yaroslavl
- National team: Latvia
- NHL draft: Undrafted
- Playing career: 1999–2024

Miķelis Rēdlihs (born July 1, 1984) is a Latvian former professional ice hockey player who played as a forward. He has played for Latvian national team in the 2005, 2006, 2007, 2008, 2009, 2010 and 2011 World Championships. Two of Miķelis Rēdlihs' brothers also are hockey players - Jēkabs Rēdlihs and Krišjānis Rēdlihs.

== Career statistics ==
=== Regular season and playoffs ===
			Regular season					Playoffs
Season	Team	League	GP	G	A	Pts	PIM	GP	G	A	Pts	PIM
1999–2000	LB/Prizma Rīga	LAT	6	4	0	4	0	—	—	—	—	—
2000–01	LB/Prizma Rīga	LAT	16	5	7	12		—	—	—	—	—
2001–02	LB/Prizma Rīga	LAT	16	3	6	9	12	—	—	—	—	—
2001–02	LB/Prizma Rīga	EEHL B	22	10	8	18	6	—	—	—	—	—
2002–03	Boston Jr. Bruins	EJHL	16	11	9	20	4	—	—	—	—	—
2002–03	New York Apple Core	EJHL	3	1	1	2	0	—	—	—	—	—
2002–03	New York Apple Core	EmJHL	3	6	6	12	0	—	—	—	—	—
2003–04	HK Rīga 2000	EEHL	30	3	7	10	18	—	—	—	—	—
2003–04	HK Rīga 2000	LAT	21	14	13	27	4	7	2	4	6	2
2004–05	HK Rīga 2000	BLR	22	6	4	10	20	3	0	1	1	0
2004–05	HK Rīga 2000	LAT	4	2	0	2	4	10	4	4	8	2
2005–06	IF Björklöven	Allsv	39	7	7	14	41	—	—	—	—	—
2006–07	Yunost Minsk	BLR	45	15	19	34	18	9	0	1	1	2
2007–08	Metallurg Zhlobin	BLR	49	11	30	41	98	5	0	3	3	14
2008–09	Dinamo Rīga	KHL	55	9	8	17	45	3	0	0	0	12
2009–10	Dinamo Rīga	KHL	56	17	15	32	36	9	1	2	3	8
2010–11	Dinamo Rīga	KHL	54	16	25	41	30	11	3	6	9	2
2011–12	Dinamo Rīga	KHL	54	13	31	44	49	7	2	8	10	6
2012–13	Lokomotiv Yaroslavl	KHL	35	3	4	7	16	5	1	0	1	0
2013–14	Lokomotiv Yaroslavl	KHL	43	4	4	8	12	18	2	4	6	10
2014–15	Dinamo Rīga	KHL	60	11	21	32	28	—	—	—	—	—
2015–16	Dinamo Rīga	KHL	59	15	10	25	38	—	—	—	—	—
2016–17	Dinamo Rīga	KHL	50	9	7	16	14	—	—	—	—	—
2017–18	Dinamo Rīga	KHL	44	11	11	22	42	—	—	—	—	—
2018–19	Dinamo Rīga	KHL	57	7	16	23	34	—	—	—	—	—
2019–20	Dinamo Rīga	KHL	62	6	13	19	42	—	—	—	—	—
2020–21	Dinamo Rīga	KHL	8	0	2	2	4	—	—	—	—	—
2020–21	HK Olimp/Venta 2002	LAT	9	4	11	15	2	9	6	6	12	6
2021–22	HK Olimp/Venta 2002	LAT	29	17	20	37	20	10	3	5	8	6
BLR totals			116	32	53	85	136	17	0	5	5	16
KHL totals			637	121	167	288	390	53	9	20	29	38

=== International ===
Year	Team	Event	GP	G	A	Pts	PIM
2001	Latvia	WJC18 D1	5	0	2	2	2
2002	Latvia	WJC D2	4	1	2	3	2
2002	Latvia	WJC18 D1	1	1	0	1	0
2003	Latvia	WJC D1	5	1	0	1	2
2004	Latvia	WJC D1	5	4	3	7	2
2005	Latvia	OGQ	3	0	0	0	0
2005	Latvia	WC	6	0	1	1	0
2006	Latvia	OG	5	1	0	1	4
2006	Latvia	WC	6	0	2	2	6
2007	Latvia	WC	4	0	0	0	2
2008	Latvia	WC	6	2	1	3	12
2009	Latvia	OGQ	3	1	2	3	2
2009	Latvia	WC	7	0	2	2	4
2010	Latvia	OG	4	1	0	1	4
2010	Latvia	WC	3	0	0	0	2
2011	Latvia	WC	6	1	6	7	4
2012	Latvia	WC	7	1	0	1	4
2013	Latvia	OGQ	3	1	2	3	0
2014	Latvia	OG	5	0	1	1	4
2014	Latvia	WC	7	3	3	6	2
2015	Latvia	WC	7	1	0	1	4
2016	Latvia	WC	4	3	2	5	0
2016	Latvia	OGQ	3	0	2	2	0
2018	Latvia	WC	8	0	2	2	4
2021	Latvia	WC	4	0	0	0	2
Junior totals			20	7	7	14	8
Senior totals			101	15	26	41	60
