= Armands Bērziņš =

Latvian ice hockey player (born 1983)

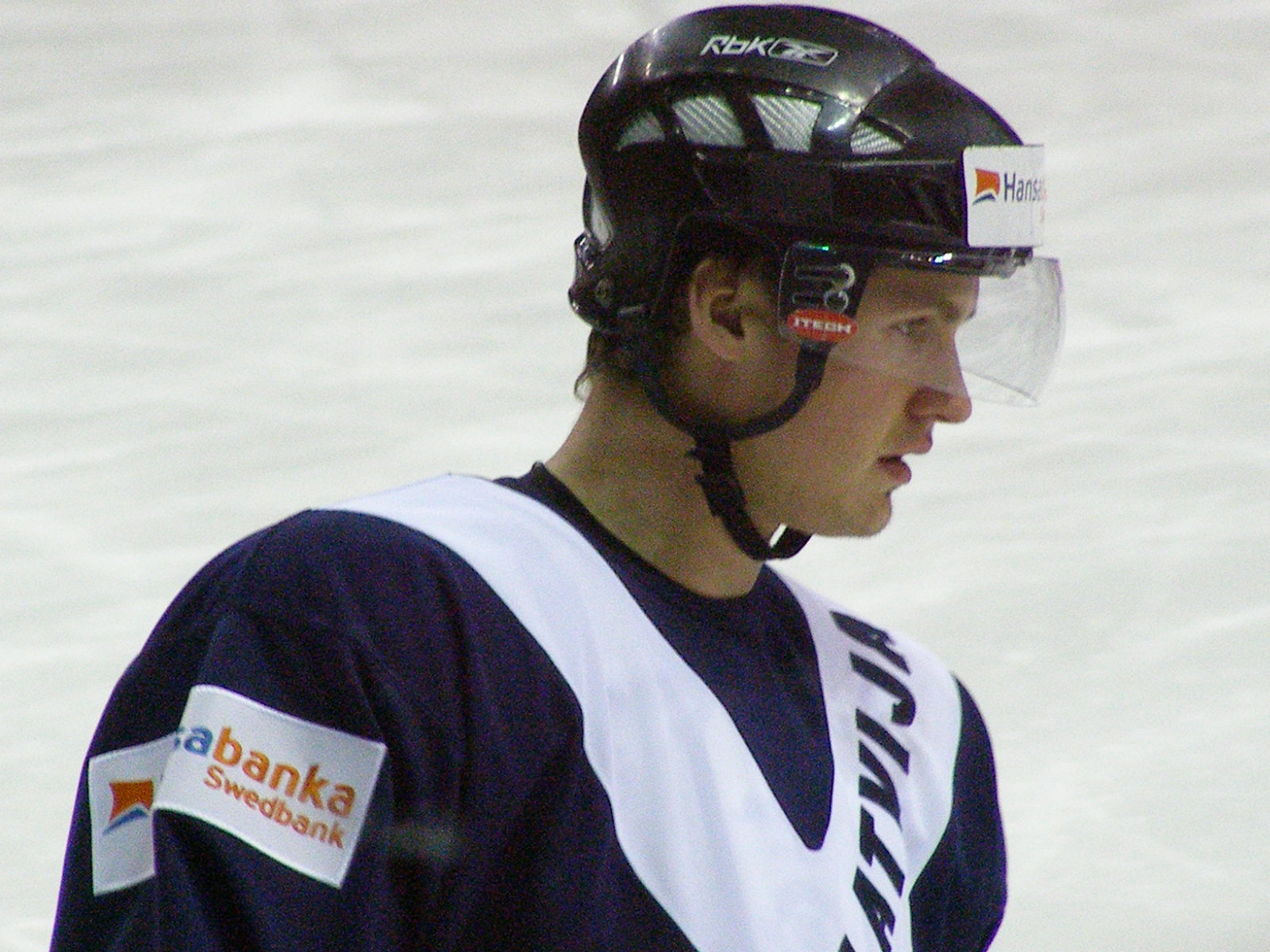
- Born: 27 December 1983 (age 42) Riga, Latvian SSR, Soviet Union
- Height: 6 ft 4 in (193 cm)
- Weight: 220 lb (100 kg; 15 st 10 lb)
- Position: Centre
- Shoots: Left
- LHHL team Former teams: HK Prizma Riga; HPK; Dinamo Riga; Yunost Minsk
- National team: Latvia
- NHL draft: 115th overall, 2002; Minnesota Wild
- Playing career: 1999–present

Armands Bērziņš (born 27 December 1983) is a Latvian professional ice hockey centre currently playing for HK Prizma Riga of the Optibet Hockey League. He played for Dinamo Riga of the Kontinental Hockey League and HPK of the Finnish SM-liiga. He was drafted by the Minnesota Wild in the 2002 NHL entry draft, 155th overall. Internationally Bērziņš has played for the Latvian national team at multiple tournaments, including the 2006, 2010, and 2014 Winter Olympics.

== International ==
He was named to the Latvia men's national ice hockey team for competition at the 2014 IIHF World Championship.

== Career statistics ==
=== Regular season and playoffs ===
			Regular season					Playoffs
Season	Team	League	GP	G	A	Pts	PIM	GP	G	A	Pts	PIM
1999–2000	Juniors Essamika Rīga	EEHL B	9	2	1	3	0	—	—	—	—	—
1999–2000	LB Prizma Rīga	LAT	11	3	7	10	0	—	—	—	—	—
2000–01	LB Prizma Rīga	LAT	21	9	11	20		—	—	—	—	—
2000–01	HK Rīga 2000	LAT	4	0	0	0		—	—	—	—	—
2000–01	HK Rīga 2000	EEHL	12	1	2	3		—	—	—	—	—
2001–02	Shawinigan Cataractes	QMJHL	63	17	18	35	59	12	2	2	4	6
2002–03	Shawinigan Cataractes	QMJHL	59	24	19	43	22	9	4	1	5	2
2003–04	Louisiana IceGators	ECHL	67	14	12	26	48	3	0	0	0	0
2004–05	Wheeling Nailers	ECHL	57	1	10	11	26	—	—	—	—	—
2005–06	HK Rīga 2000	BLR	48	10	8	18	46	4	0	0	0	4
2006–07	Vsetínská hokejová	ELH	35	5	3	8	76	—	—	—	—	—
2006–07	HK Rīga 2000	LAT	23	9	12	21	26		5	6	11
2007–08	HK Rīga 2000	LAT	11	3	3	6	41	3	0	1	1	27
2007–08	HK Jestřábi Prostějov	CZE.2	11	1	5	6	14	—	—	—	—	—
2007–08	HK Ardo Nitra	SVK	16	1	4	5	14	—	—	—	—	—
2008–09	Dinamo Rīga	KHL	44	5	9	14	79	3	0	0	0	2
2009–10	HK Dinamo/Juniors	BLR	25	4	9	13	24	—	—	—	—	—
2009–10	Dinamo Rīga	KHL	22	1	1	2	22	2	0	0	0	2
2010–11	HPK	SM-l	55	11	7	18	38	2	0	1	1	2
2011–12	Yunost Minsk	BLR	43	8	27	35	70	5	1	1	2	4
2012–13	Kompanion Kyiv	UKR	27	8	8	16	26	10	1	3	4	2
2013–14	Beibarys Atyrau	KAZ	43	6	18	24	61	15	1	5	6	6
2014–15	HC Pustertal Wölfe	ITA	37	7	17	24	61	10	2	1	3	6
2015–16	Dinamo Rīga	KHL	48	0	5	5	27	—	—	—	—	—
2016–17	Gothiques d'Amiens	FRA	14	2	5	7	10	5	1	0	1	0
2017–18	Füchse Duisburg	DEU.3	41	11	28	39	57	2	0	2	2	12
2018–19	HK Prizma Rīga	LAT	32	7	13	20	68	3	0	0	0	0
2019–20	HK Prizma/IHS	LAT	35	9	25	34	26	—	—	—	—	—
2020–21	HK Prizma/IHS	LAT	35	10	13	23	26	—	—	—	—	—
2021–22	HK Prizma/IHS	LAT	33	12	10	22	20	—	—	—	—	—
2021–22	HK Liepāja	LAT	2	0	0	0	0	6	0	4	4	6
LAT totals			205	62	94	156	207	12	0	5	5	33
BLR totals			112	22	44	66	140	9	1	1	2	8
KHL totals			114	6	15	21	128	5	0	0	0	4

- LAT totals do not include stats from the 2006–07 playoffs.

=== International ===
Year	Team	Event	GP	G	A	Pts	PIM
2000	Latvia	WJC18 B	5	0	0	0	2
2001	Latvia	WJC D1	5	1	2	3	2
2001	Latvia	WJC18 D1	5	1	3	4	2
2002	Latvia	WJC D2	4	5	3	8	20
2003	Latvia	WJC D1	5	3	2	5	24
2005	Latvia	OGQ	3	1	0	1	4
2006	Latvia	OG	5	0	1	1	4
2007	Latvia	WC	6	1	2	3	10
2008	Latvia	WC	6	0	1	1	8
2009	Latvia	WC	7	0	0	0	4
2010	Latvia	OG	4	0	1	1	2
2011	Latvia	WC	6	0	2	2	4
2012	Latvia	WC	6	1	1	2	14
2013	Latvia	OGQ	3	0	0	0	6
2013	Latvia	WC	7	1	0	1	27
2014	Latvia	OG	2	0	0	0	0
2014	Latvia	WC	6	0	1	1	0
2015	Latvia	WC	7	0	0	0	0
Junior totals			24	10	10	20	50
Senior totals			68	4	9	13	83
