= 1996 IIHF European Cup =

European ice hockey tournament

The 1996 European Cup was the 32nd and last edition of the European Cup, IIHF's premier European club ice hockey tournament. The season started on October 11, 1996, and finished on December 30, 1996.

The tournament was won by Lada Togliatti, who beat Modo in the final.

== First group round ==
=== Group A ===
(Belgrade, Serbia, FR Yugoslavia)

| Team #1 | Score | Team #2 |
|---|---|---|
| Dunaferr SE (Hungary) | 33:1 | (Turkey) Kavaklıdere Belediyesi |
| KHK Crvena Zvezda (Federal Republic of Yugoslavia) | 3:1 | (Bulgaria) HK Slavia Sofia |
| KHK Crvena Zvezda (Federal Republic of Yugoslavia) | 9:2 | (Turkey) Kavaklıdere Belediyesi |
| Dunaferr SE (Hungary) | 12:0 | (Bulgaria) HK Slavia Sofia |
| HK Slavia Sofia (Bulgaria) | 10:1 | (Turkey) Kavaklıdere Belediyesi |
| KHK Crvena Zvezda (Federal Republic of Yugoslavia) | 2:4 | (Hungary) Dunaferr SE |

=== Group A standings ===
| Rank | Team | Points |
| 1 | (Hungary) Dunaferr SE | 6 |
| 2 | (Federal Republic of Yugoslavia) KHK Crvena Zvezda | 4 |
| 3 | (Bulgaria) HK Slavia Sofia | 2 |
| 4 | (Turkey) Kavaklıdere Belediyesi | 0 |

=== Group B ===
(Ljubljana, Slovenia)

| Team #1 | Score | Team #2 |
|---|---|---|
| EHC Kloten (Switzerland) | 9:0 | (Croatia) KHL Zagreb |
| HDD Olimpija Ljubljana (Slovenia) | 9:3 | (Croatia) KHL Zagreb |
| HDD Olimpija Ljubljana (Slovenia) | 3:4 | (Switzerland) EHC Kloten |

=== Group B standings ===
| Rank | Team | Points |
| 1 | (Switzerland) EHC Kloten | 4 |
| 2 | (Slovenia) HDD Olimpija Ljubljana | 2 |
| 3 | (Croatia) KHL Zagreb | 0 |

=== Group C ===
(Sheffield, England, United Kingdom)

| Team #1 | Score | Team #2 |
|---|---|---|
| HC Steaua București (Romania) | 5:2 | (Netherlands) Tilburg Trappers |
| Sheffield Steelers (United Kingdom) | 16:0 | (Spain) CH Jaca |
| HC Steaua București (Romania) | 7:1 | (Spain) CH Jaca |
| Sheffield Steelers (United Kingdom) | 5:1 | (Netherlands) Tilburg Trappers |
| Tilburg Trappers (Netherlands) | 12:8 | (Spain) CH Jaca |
| Sheffield Steelers (United Kingdom) | 4:1 | (Romania) HC Steaua București |

=== Group C standings ===
| Rank | Team | Points |
| 1 | (United Kingdom) Sheffield Steelers | 6 |
| 2 | (Romania) HC Steaua București | 4 |
| 3 | (Netherlands) Tilburg Trappers | 2 |
| 4 | (Spain) CH Jaca | 0 |

=== Group D ===
(Novopolotsk, Belarus)

| Team #1 | Score | Team #2 |
|---|---|---|
| Polymir Novopolotsk (Belarus) | 19:1 | (Estonia) Narva Kreenholm |
| Torpedo Ust-Kamenogorsk (Kazakhstan) | 14:1 | (Estonia) Narva Kreenholm |
| Polymir Novopolotsk (Belarus) | 2:4 | (Kazakhstan) Torpedo Ust-Kamenogorsk |

=== Group D standings ===
| Rank | Team | Points |
| 1 | (Kazakhstan) Torpedo Ust-Kamenogorsk | 4 |
| 2 | (Belarus) Polymir Novopolotsk | 2 |
| 3 | (Estonia) Narva Kreenholm | 0 |

=== Group E ===
(Nowy Targ, Poland)

| Team #1 | Score | Team #2 |
|---|---|---|
| Podhale Nowy Targ (Poland) | 11:2 | (Israel) Lions Jerusalem |
| Sokil Kyiv (Ukraine) | 7:4 | (Lithuania) SC Energija |
| Sokil Kyiv (Ukraine) | 9:1 | (Israel) Lions Jerusalem |
| Podhale Nowy Targ (Poland) | 12:1 | (Lithuania) SC Energija |
| Lions Jerusalem (Israel) | 7:4 | (Lithuania) SC Energija |
| Podhale Nowy Targ (Poland) | 0:4 | (Ukraine) Sokil Kyiv |

=== Group E standings ===
| Rank | Team | Points |
| 1 | (Ukraine) Sokil Kyiv | 6 |
| 2 | (Poland) Podhale Nowy Targ | 4 |
| 3 | (Israel) Lions Jerusalem | 2 |
| 4 | (Lithuania) SC Energija | 0 |

(Austria) VEU Feldkirch, (Latvia) HC Nik's Brih, (Norway) Storhamar, (Italy) HC Bolzano, (France) Brest HC, (Finland) HPK, (Slovakia) TJ VSŽ Košice, (Czech Republic) HC Petra Vsetín, (Russia) Lada Togliatti, (Sweden) Modo : bye

== Second group round ==
=== Group F ===
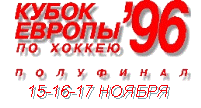

(Togliatti, Russia)

| Team #1 | Score | Team #2 |
|---|---|---|
| HDD Olimpija Ljubljana (Slovenia) | 5:1 | (Latvia) HC Nik's Brih |
| Lada Togliatti (Russia) | 8:1 | (Hungary) Dunaferr SE |
| Dunaferr SE (Hungary) | 8:4 | (Latvia) HC Nik's Brih |
| Lada Togliatti (Russia) | 6:0 | (Slovenia) HDD Olimpija Ljubljana |
| HDD Olimpija Ljubljana (Slovenia) | 5:3 | (Hungary) Dunaferr SE |
| Lada Togliatti (Russia) | 6:0 | (Latvia) HC Nik's Brih |

=== Group F standings ===
| Rank | Team | Points |
| 1 | (Russia) Lada Togliatti | 6 |
| 2 | (Slovenia) HDD Olimpija Ljubljana | 4 |
| 3 | (Hungary) Dunaferr SE | 2 |
| 4 | (Latvia) HC Nik's Brih | 0 |

=== Group G ===
(Bolzano, Italy)

| Team #1 | Score | Team #2 |
|---|---|---|
| TJ VSŽ Košice (Slovakia) | 6:1 | (Switzerland) EHC Kloten |
| HC Bolzano (Italy) | 15:2 | (Romania) HC Steaua București |
| TJ VSŽ Košice (Slovakia) | 10:1 | (Romania) HC Steaua București |
| HC Bolzano (Italy) | 1:4 | (Switzerland) EHC Kloten |
| EHC Kloten (Switzerland) | 7:0 | (Romania) HC Steaua București |
| HC Bolzano (Italy) | 2:1 | (Slovakia) TJ VSŽ Košice |

=== Group G standings ===
| Rank | Team | Points |
| 1 | (Slovakia) TJ VSŽ Košice | 4 (+4) |
| 2 | (Switzerland) EHC Kloten | 4 (-2) |
| 3 | (Italy) HC Bolzano | 4 (-2) |
| 4 | (Romania) HC Steaua București | 0 |

=== Group H ===
(Hämeenlinna, Finland)

| Team #1 | Score | Team #2 |
|---|---|---|
| Storhamar (Norway) | 7:5 | (United Kingdom) Sheffield Steelers |
| HPK (Finland) | 3:2 | (Belarus) Polymir Novopolotsk |
| Storhamar (Norway) | 1:1 | (Belarus) Polymir Novopolotsk |
| HPK (Finland) | 2:2 | (United Kingdom) Sheffield Steelers |
| Polymir Novopolotsk (Belarus) | 5:4 | (United Kingdom) Sheffield Steelers |
| HPK (Finland) | 3:0 | (Norway) Storhamar |

=== Group H standings ===
| Rank | Team | Points |
| 1 | (Finland) HPK | 5 |
| 2 | (Belarus) Polymir Novopolotsk | 3 |
| 3 | (Norway) Storhamar | 3 |
| 4 | (United Kingdom) Sheffield Steelers | 1 |

=== Group J ===
(Feldkirch, Vorarlberg, Austria)

| Team #1 | Score | Team #2 |
|---|---|---|
| HC Petra Vsetín (Czech Republic) | 8:1 | (Poland) Podhale Nowy Targ |
| VEU Feldkirch (Austria) | 7:5 | (Kazakhstan) Torpedo Ust-Kamenogorsk |
| VEU Feldkirch (Austria) | 9:2 | (Poland) Podhale Nowy Targ |
| HC Petra Vsetín (Czech Republic) | 9:3 | (Kazakhstan) Torpedo Ust-Kamenogorsk |
| Torpedo Ust-Kamenogorsk (Kazakhstan) | 6:1 | (Poland) Podhale Nowy Targ |
| VEU Feldkirch (Austria) | 5:2 | (Czech Republic) HC Petra Vsetín |

=== Group J standings ===
| Rank | Team | Points |
| 1 | (Austria) VEU Feldkirch | 6 |
| 2 | (Czech Republic) HC Petra Vsetín | 4 |
| 3 | (Kazakhstan) Torpedo Ust-Kamenogorsk | 2 |
| 4 | (Poland) Podhale Nowy Targ | 0 |

=== Group K ===
(Bordeaux, France)

| Team #1 | Score | Team #2 |
|---|---|---|
| Sokil Kyiv (Ukraine) | 7:0 | (Federal Republic of Yugoslavia) KHK Crvena Zvezda |
| Brest HC (France) | 3:4 | (Sweden) Modo |
| Brest HC (France) | 17:0 | (Federal Republic of Yugoslavia) KHK Crvena Zvezda |
| Modo (Sweden) | 4:2 | (Ukraine) Sokil Kyiv |
| Modo (Sweden) | 17:0 | (Federal Republic of Yugoslavia) KHK Crvena Zvezda |
| Brest HC (France) | 3:2 | (Ukraine) Sokil Kyiv |

=== Group K standings ===
| Rank | Team | Points |
| 1 | (Sweden) Modo | 6 |
| 2 | (France) Brest HC | 4 |
| 3 | (Ukraine) Sokil Kyiv | 2 |
| 4 | (Federal Republic of Yugoslavia) KHK Crvena Zvezda | 0 |

(Germany) Düsseldorfer EG : bye

== Final stage ==
(Düsseldorf, North Rhine-Westphalia, Germany)

=== Group L ===
| Team #1 | Score | Team #2 |
|---|---|---|
| Lada Togliatti (Russia) | 5:0 | (Slovakia) TJ VSŽ Košice |
| Düsseldorfer EG (Germany) | 7:2 | (Slovakia) TJ VSŽ Košice |
| Düsseldorfer EG (Germany) | 2:7 | (Russia) Lada Togliatti |

=== Group L standings ===
| Rank | Team | Points |
| 1 | (Russia) Lada Togliatti | 4 |
| 2 | (Germany) Düsseldorfer EG | 2 |
| 3 | (Slovakia) TJ VSŽ Košice | 0 |

=== Group M ===
| Team #1 | Score | Team #2 |
|---|---|---|
| Modo (Sweden) | 5:3 | (Austria) VEU Feldkirch |
| VEU Feldkirch (Austria) | 4:2 | (Finland) HPK |
| HPK (Finland) | 4:3 | (Sweden) Modo |

=== Group M standings ===
| Rank | Team | Points |
| 1 | (Sweden) Modo | 2 (+1) |
| 2 | (Austria) VEU Feldkirch | 2 (0) |
| 3 | (Finland) HPK | 2 (-1) |

=== Third place match ===
| Team #1 | Score | Team #2 |
|---|---|---|
| Düsseldorfer EG (Germany) | 5:3 | (Austria) VEU Feldkirch |

=== Final ===
| Team #1 | Score | Team #2 |
|---|---|---|
| Lada Togliatti (Russia) | 4:3 | (Sweden) Modo |
