= Agris Saviels =

Latvian ice hockey player

- Born: January 15, 1982 (age 44) Jūrmala, Soviet Union
- Height: 6 ft 1 in (185 cm)
- Weight: 198 lb (90 kg; 14 st 2 lb)
- Position: Defence
- Shot: Left
- Played for: HK Rīga 2000; Hershey Bears; Torpedo Nizhny Novgorod; MsHK Žilina; Herning Blue Fox; Odense Bulldogs; Dinamo Riga; Metallurg Zhlobin; HC Valpellice; HC Sterzing-Vipiteno; HC Kompanion-Naftogaz; HK Kurbads; Rødovre Mighty Bulls; HK Mogo
- National team: Latvia
- NHL draft: 63rd overall, 2000; Colorado Avalanche
- Playing career: 1996–2020

Agris Saviels (born January 15, 1982) is a Latvian former professional ice hockey defenseman. He last played for HK Mogo of the Latvian Hockey League (LAT).

== Playing career ==
Saviels was drafted 63rd overall in the 2000 NHL entry draft by the Colorado Avalanche. Prior to be drafted, Saviels played in his native country Latvia with HK Lido Nafta Rīga before traveling to North America to play Junior with the Notre Dame Hounds and then the Owen Sound Attack of the Ontario Hockey League.

Saviels was signed by the Colorado Avalanche on July 23, 2002, but never played a game with the team, playing with their affiliate the Hershey Bears of the American Hockey League.

Since the 2005–06 season, Saviels has played in Europe in the Belarus, Russian, Slovak, Latvian and Danish leagues.

In the 2008–09 season, Saviels signed a one-year contract and started with Kontinental Hockey League club Dinamo Riga, but was soon sent down to the farm club, HK Riga 2000 of the Belarusian Extraleague. In January 2009, Saviels then transferred to fellow Belarusian team Metallurg Zhlobin and re-signed to an additional year to continue playing in the 2009–10 season.

On September 1, 2010, Saviels left for Italy and signed a one-year contract as a free agent with Valpellice in the Serie A. During the following season, Saviels returned for a second stint in Italy to end the 2011–12 season with HC Broncos Sterzing-Vipiteno.

On July 28, 2012, it was announced that Saviels had signed for his first venture into Ukraine with HC Kompanion-Naftogaz of the Professional Hockey League. In 28 games, Saviels registered only 3 assists from the Blueline.

On August 12, 2013, due to a pay dispute between players and Kompanion, Saviels returned to Latvia and signed a contract with HK Kurbads of the LHL.

== Career statistics ==
=== Regular season and playoffs ===
			Regular season					Playoffs
Season	Team	League	GP	G	A	Pts	PIM	GP	G	A	Pts	PIM
1996–97	HK Lido Nafta Rīga	LAT	15	1	2	3	4	—	—	—	—	—
1997–98	HK Lido Nafta Rīga	LAT	40	7	21	28	30	—	—	—	—	—
1997–98	HK Rīga 2000	EEHL	8	0	0	0	4	—	—	—	—	—
1998–99	Notre Dame Hounds AAA	SMHL	17	6	9	15	23	—	—	—	—	—
1998–99	Notre Dame Hounds	SJHL	13	0	1	1	4	—	—	—	—	—
1998–99	Olds Grizzlys	AJHL	2	0	0	0	0	—	—	—	—	—
1999–2000	Owen Sound Platers	OHL	65	7	25	32	56	—	—	—	—	—
2000–01	Owen Sound Attack	OHL	68	14	37	51	46	5	0	1	1	2
2000–01	Hershey Bears	AHL	1	0	0	0	0	—	—	—	—	—
2001–02	Owen Sound Attack	OHL	60	5	27	32	37	—	—	—	—	—
2002–03	Hershey Bears	AHL	43	0	3	3	33	3	0	0	0	0
2002–03	Reading Royals	ECHL	8	1	0	1	4	—	—	—	—	—
2003–04	Hershey Bears	AHL	67	2	5	7	39	—	—	—	—	—
2004–05	Hershey Bears	AHL	47	0	5	5	41	—	—	—	—	—
2005–06	HK Rīga 2000	BLR	17	2	1	3	12	—	—	—	—	—
2005–06	Torpedo Nizhny Novgorod	RUS.2	21	1	1	2	18	—	—	—	—	—
2005–06	Torpedo–2 Nizhny Novgorod	RUS.3	7	1	3	4	20	—	—	—	—	—
2006–07	MsHK Žilina	SVK	52	3	5	8	36	—	—	—	—	—
2007–08	HK Rīga 2000	LAT	3	1	1	2	6	—	—	—	—	—
2007–08	Herning Blue Fox	DEN	5	0	0	0	2	—	—	—	—	—
2007–08	Odense Bulldogs	DEN	37	3	5	8	26	11	2	3	5	14
2008–09	Dinamo Rīga	KHL	2	0	0	0	4	—	—	—	—	—
2008–09	HK Rīga 2000	BLR	26	1	4	5	26	—	—	—	—	—
2008–09	Metallurg Zhlobin	BLR	17	2	4	6	6	—	—	—	—	—
2009–10	Metallurg Zhlobin	BLR	42	3	9	12	26	—	—	—	—	—
2010–11	HC Valpellice	ITA	36	6	18	24	20	3	0	0	0	0
2011–12	HC Most	CZE.2	6	0	1	1	0	—	—	—	—	—
2011–12	HK SMScredit	LAT	5	1	3	4	2	—	—	—	—	—
2011–12	WSV Sterzing Broncos	ITA	28	2	7	9	30	—	—	—	—	—
2012–13	HC Kompanion–Naftogaz	UKR	28	0	3	3	37	13	0	1	1	6
2013–14	HK Kurbads	LAT	21	2	4	6	12	—	—	—	—	—
2013–14	Rødovre Mighty Bulls	DEN	8	0	0	0	2	5	0	2	2	2
2014–15	HK Mogo	LAT	28	2	11	13	4	10	0	4	4	0
2015–16	HK Mogo	LAT	28	2	18	20	6	8	0	4	4	4
2016–17	HK Mogo	LAT	27	4	13	17	6	12	1	1	2	8
2017–18	HK Mogo	LAT	25	3	8	11	8	5	1	1	2	6
2018–19	HK Mogo	LAT	27	1	7	8	0	9	0	2	2	4
2019–20	HK Mogo	LAT	22	2	4	6	8	—	—	—	—	—
LAT totals			243	26	92	118	86	44	2	12	14	22
AHL totals			158	2	13	15	113	3	0	0	0	0
BLR totals			102	8	18	26	70	7	0	3	3	12

=== International ===
Year	Team	Event	GP	G	A	Pts	PIM
1998	Latvia	EJC C	4	0	0	0	0
1999	Latvia	WJC B	6	1	1	2	6
2000	Latvia	WJC B	5	0	1	1	8
2000	Latvia	WJC18 B	5	2	1	3	6
2004	Latvia	WC	7	0	0	0	0
2005	Latvia	WC	6	0	0	0	2
2006	Latvia	OG	5	0	0	0	8
2006	Latvia	WC	6	0	0	0	10
2007	Latvia	WC	6	1	0	1	2
2008	Latvia	WC	6	0	0	0	4
2013	Latvia	WC	5	1	0	1	2
Junior totals			20	3	3	6	20
Senior totals			41	2	0	2	28
