= 1995–96 Latvian Hockey League season =

1995–96 Latvian Hockey League
- League: Latvian Hockey Higher League
- Sport: Ice hockey
- Teams: 6

Regular season
- Winners: HK Nik’s Brih Riga

Playoffs

Finals
- Champions: Riga Allianse
- Runners-up: Essamika Ogre

Latvian Hockey League seasons
- ← 1994–95 1996–97 →

The 1995–96 Latvian Hockey League season was the fifth season of the Latvian Hockey League, the top level of ice hockey in Latvia. Eight teams participated in the league, and Riga Alianse won the championship.

== Regular season ==
	Club	GP	W	U	L	GF:GA	Pts
1.	HK Nik’s Brih Riga	30	20	5	5	152:98	45
2.	Essamika Ogre	30	20	4	6	213:112	44
3.	Juniors Riga	30	19	5	6	154:87	43
4.	Riga Allianse	30	13	5	12	123:96	31
5.	HK Laterna Riga	30	5	3	22	82:172	13
6.	BHS Essamika Ogre	30	2	0	28	66:225	4

== Playoffs ==
Quarterfinals

- HK Nik's Brih Riga - Vital Riga 2–0 on series
- Riga Alianse - HK Laterna Riga 2–0 on series
- Essamika Ogre - HK Lido Nafta Riga 2–0 on series
- Juniors Riga - BHS Essamika Ogre 2–0 on series

Semifinals

- Riga Alianse - HK Nik's Brih Riga 2–0 on series
- Essamika Ogre - Juniors Riga 2–1 on series

Final

- Riga Alianse - Essamika Ogre 3–1 on series
