= 1997–98 Latvian Hockey League season =

1997–98 Latvian Hockey League
- League: Latvian Hockey Higher League
- Sport: Ice hockey
- Teams: 5

Regular season
- Champions: HK Nik’s Brih Riga
- Runners-up: HK Lido Nafta Riga

Latvian Hockey League seasons
- ← 1996–97 1998–99 →

The 1997–98 Latvian Hockey League season was the seventh season of the Latvian Hockey League, the top level of ice hockey in Latvia. Five teams participated in the league, and HK Nik's Brih Riga won the championship.

== Standings ==
	Club	GP	W	U	L	GF:GA	Pts
1.	HK Nik’s Brih Riga	16	14	0	2	153:57	28
2.	HK Lido Nafta Riga	16	11	0	5	102:68	22
3.	HK Laterna Riga	16	9	0	7	83:68	18
4.	Dinamo 81 Riga	16	4	0	12	73:123	8
5.	Vital Riga	16	2	0	14	55:150	4
