= Lauris Dārziņš =

Latvian ice hockey player (born 1985)

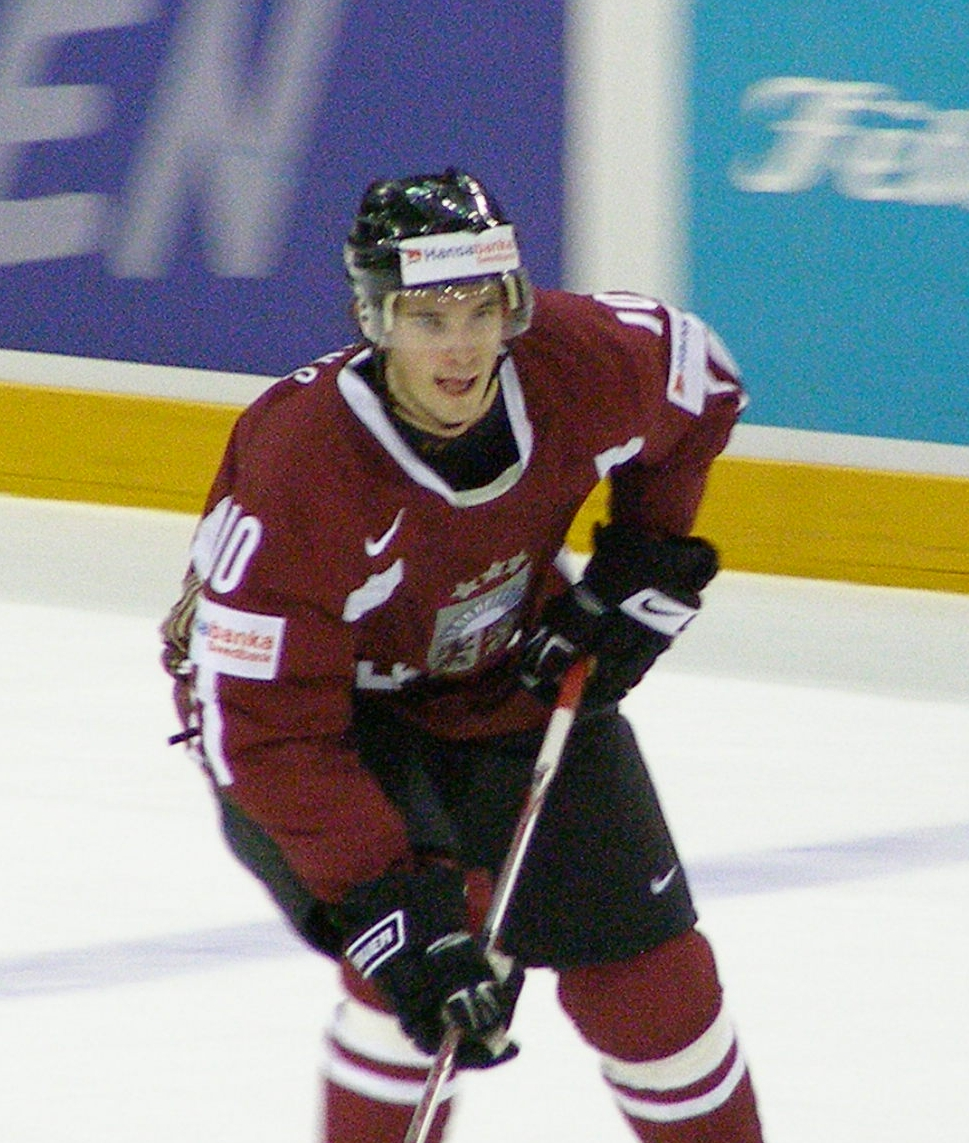
- Darzins in 2008
- Born: January 28, 1985 (age 41) Riga, Latvian SSR, Soviet Union
- Height: 6 ft 3 in (191 cm)
- Weight: 201 lb (91 kg; 14 st 5 lb)
- Position: Winger
- Shot: Right
- Played for: Ilves; HC Vsetín; HC Třinec; HK Gomel; Dinamo Riga; Ak Bars Kazan; Traktor Chelyabinsk
- National team: Latvia
- NHL draft: 268th overall, 2003; Nashville Predators
- Playing career: 2001–2022

Lauris Dārziņš (born January 28, 1985) is a Latvian former professional ice hockey player who is a winger.

== Playing career ==
=== Junior ===
Dārziņš was drafted in the 9th round, 268th overall in the 2003 NHL entry draft by the Nashville Predators out of the junior hockey system Finnish team Lukko Rauma. In the 2004–05 season, Dārziņš played in the North American WHL with the then-reigning Memorial Cup champion Kelowna Rockets, alongside fellow Predators prospect and 2003 draft choice Shea Weber. In two seasons with the Rockets, Dārziņš recorded 32 goals and 67 points in 90 games, helping the Rockets win the Ed Chynoweth Cup in 2005, although they failed to repeat as Memorial Cup champions.

=== Return to Europe ===
After completing two seasons with the Rockets, Dārziņš went unsigned with the Predators and opted to return to Finland in 2006, signing with Ilves of the SM-liiga. After just thirteen games, Dārziņš moved to HC Vsetín, then of the Czech Extraliga, where he again played just thirteen games, scoring three goals.

In the summer of 2007, Dārziņš signed on with HC Třinec but played just one game for the club before latching on with HK Gomel of the Belarusian Extraleague. Dārziņš finally broke through professionally with a strong campaign for the Belarusian side, with seventeen goals and 34 points in 32 games in the 2007–08 campaign, leading the team in goals and points. This strong season garnered him some attention among stronger Eastern European clubs, and on May 27, 2008, he signed on with Russian club HC MVD of the newly re-branded Russian SuperLeague.

=== Dinamo Riga ===
Dārziņš would never play a game for MVD and eventually landed with the resurrected Dinamo Riga club in his hometown for the team's inaugural campaign. Dārziņš scored just eight goals and seventeen points in 56 games, and the team scored just 132 goals total but found their way into the playoffs before getting swept in the first round by Dynamo Moscow.

Dārziņš would return to Riga in 2009–10 and enjoyed a breakout season. The winger scored fourteen goals, was the third-most on the team, and had 31 total points in 54 games. Riga returned to the playoffs, upsetting top-seeded SKA Saint Petersburg three games to one, but falling in the second round to MVD four games to one. Dārziņš scored two goals and four points in nine playoff games.

In the spring of 2010, Dārziņš' contract with Riga expired. After being briefly linked with Russian powerhouse club Ak Bars Kazan, Dārziņš revealed that he had been in contact with scouts with the NHL club that drafted him, the Nashville Predators, about a possible return to North American hockey. At the end of the 2009–10 season, Dārziņš was the fourth-leading scorer in Riga's two-year history, with 47 points in 112 games.

Dārziņš ultimately spurned any forays into North America in favor of another season with his hometown club. He was rewarded with his best offensive totals at any level, scoring 21 goals and 23 assists in 45 games for Dinamo, leading the team in goals and points. Dārziņš was named to the 2011 KHL All-Star Game in St. Petersburg as part of Team Yashin and finished 16th in the KHL in scoring. Dinamo returned to the Gagarin Cup playoffs, with Dārziņš scoring ten points in eleven games as Riga upset Dynamo Moscow four games to two in the first round.

On May 3, 2011, Dārziņš joined Ak Bars Kazan on a multi-year contract. In June 2013 he was traded to Traktor Chelyabinsk. In January 2014, Dārziņš returned to Dinamo Riga.

== International play ==
Dārziņš has been a regular fixture on the Latvian national team at varying levels since 2002. At 17, he made his debut with the national team at the Division I (second tier) IIHF World U18 Championship, scoring two goals and three total points in five games. Dārziņš returned to the U18s the following year, posting one goal and two points in five games. He broke through with the Under-20 team in 2003 and would go on to play in three Division I IIHF World U20 Championships, where he would score 12 goals and 24 points in 15 games over three tournaments.

In 2006, Dārziņš made his debut with the full national team as a 21-year-old in the 2006 Men's World Ice Hockey Championships, which were held in his hometown of Riga. He has not missed the tournament since his debut, scoring nine goals and twelve points in 23 games over four tournaments.

In February 2010, Dārziņš represented Latvia at the 2010 Winter Olympics in Vancouver, recording one assist in four games. At the 2014 Winter Olympics, he was the leading scorer on the Latvian team with four goals and one assist in five games.

== Career statistics ==
=== Regular season and playoffs ===
			Regular season					Playoffs
Season	Team	League	GP	G	A	Pts	PIM	GP	G	A	Pts	PIM
2000–01	HK Lido Nafta Rīga	LAT	20	12	15	27		—	—	—	—	—
2001–02	Lukko	FIN U18	7	4	1	5	4	—	—	—	—	—
2001–02	Lukko	FIN U20	5	1	0	1	0	—	—	—	—	—
2002–03	Lukko	FIN U18	13	10	10	20	6	—	—	—	—	—
2002–03	Lukko	FIN U20	13	6	4	10	6	—	—	—	—	—
2003–04	Lukko	FIN U20	35	17	8	25	14	—	—	—	—	—
2004–05	Kelowna Rockets	WHL	53	19	15	34	38	24	7	7	14	10
2005–06	Kelowna Rockets	WHL	47	13	20	33	26	6	5	1	6	2
2006–07	Ilves	SM-l	13	1	1	2	6	—	—	—	—	—
2006–07	Vsetínská hokejová	ELH	13	3	0	3	22	—	—	—	—	—
2007–08	HC Oceláři Třinec	ELH	1	0	0	0	0	—	—	—	—	—
2007–08	HK Gomel	BLR	32	17	18	35	46	—	—	—	—	—
2008–09	Dinamo Rīga	KHL	56	8	8	16	56	3	0	0	0	4
2009–10	Dinamo Rīga	KHL	54	14	17	31	30	9	2	2	4	12
2010–11	Dinamo Rīga	KHL	45	21	23	44	70	11	5	5	10	2
2011–12	Ak Bars Kazan	KHL	15	2	5	7	8	4	0	0	0	0
2012–13	Ak Bars Kazan	KHL	28	4	8	12	6	9	4	0	4	4
2013–14	Traktor Chelyabinsk	KHL	19	3	3	6	4	—	—	—	—	—
2013–14	Dinamo Rīga	KHL	10	2	4	6	8	7	4	1	5	0
2014–15	Dinamo Rīga	KHL	56	13	19	32	22	—	—	—	—	—
2015–16	Dinamo Rīga	KHL	59	10	18	28	6	—	—	—	—	—
2016–17	Dinamo Rīga	KHL	56	11	18	29	10	—	—	—	—	—
2017–18	Dinamo Rīga	KHL	24	5	13	18	15	—	—	—	—	—
2018–19	Dinamo Rīga	KHL	62	18	26	44	32	—	—	—	—	—
2019–20	Dinamo Rīga	KHL	54	11	21	32	14	—	—	—	—	—
2020–21	Dinamo Rīga	KHL	41	7	16	23	8	—	—	—	—	—
2021–22	Dinamo Rīga	KHL	36	3	15	18	12	—	—	—	—	—
KHL totals			615	132	214	346	302	43	15	8	23	22

=== International ===
Year	Team	Event	Result	GP	G	A	Pts	PIM
2002	Latvia	WJC18 D1	15th	5	2	1	3	2
2003	Latvia	WJC D1	18th	5	2	2	4	0
2003	Latvia	WJC18 D1	17th	5	1	1	2	2
2004	Latvia	WJC D1	16th	5	6	4	10	6
2005	Latvia	WJC D1	12th	5	4	6	10	4
2006	Latvia	WC	10th	6	2	0	2	6
2007	Latvia	WC	13th	6	3	2	5	2
2008	Latvia	WC	10th	6	2	1	3	16
2009	Latvia	OGQ	Q	3	3	1	4	0
2009	Latvia	WC	7th	7	2	0	2	18
2010	Latvia	OG	12th	4	0	1	1	10
2011	Latvia	WC	13th	3	1	0	1	4
2013	Latvia	OGQ	Q	3	3	2	5	0
2013	Latvia	WC	11th	7	5	1	6	2
2014	Latvia	OG	8th	5	4	1	5	2
2015	Latvia	WC	13th	7	3	7	10	2
2016	Latvia	OGQ	DNQ	3	0	3	3	0
2019	Latvia	WC	10th	7	3	3	6	4
2021	Latvia	WC	11th	7	2	2	4	2
2021	Latvia	OGQ	Q	3	0	4	4	0
2022	Latvia	OG	11th	3	2	2	4	2
Junior totals				25	15	14	29	14
Senior totals				86	36	30	66	70
