= 1998–99 Latvian Hockey League season =

1998–99 Latvian Hockey League
- League: Latvian Hockey Higher League
- Sport: Ice hockey
- Teams: 7

Regular season
- Champions: HK Nik’s Brih Riga
- Runners-up: HK Lido Nafta Riga

Latvian Hockey League seasons
- ← 1997–98 1999–2000 →

The 1998–99 Latvian Hockey League season was the eighth season of the Latvian Hockey League, the top level of ice hockey in Latvia. Seven teams participated in the league, and HK Nik's Brih Riga won the championship.

== First round ==
	Club	GP	W	U	L	GF:GA	Pts
1.	HK Nik’s Brih Riga	12	11	1	0	119:48	23
2.	HK Lido Nafta Riga	12	8	1	3	82:45	17
3.	Dinamo 81 Riga	12	7	2	3	70:47	16
4.	Essamika Ogre/LB/Juniors-82	12	5	1	6	50:58	11
5.	HK Laterna Riga	12	5	1	6	64:45	11
6.	DHL Riga	12	2	2	8	42:72	6
7.	LB/Prizma-83 Riga	12	0	0	12	41:153	0

== Second round ==
=== Final round ===
	Club	GP	W	U	L	GF:GA	Pts
1.	HK Nik’s Brih Riga	6	5	0	1	39:27	21
2.	HK Lido Nafta Riga	6	4	0	2	34:19	14
3.	Dinamo 81 Riga	6	3	0	3	35:27	11
4.	Essamika Ogre/LB/Juniors-82	6	0	0	6	15:50	2

=== Placing round ===
	Club	GP	W	U	L	GF:GA	Pts
1.	HK Laterna Riga	4	4	0	0	50:8	16
2.	DHL Riga	4	2	0	2	19:25	8
3.	LB/Prizma-83 Riga	4	0	0	4	12:48	0
