= 1996–97 Latvian Hockey League season =

1996–97 Latvian Hockey League
- League: Latvian Hockey Higher League
- Sport: Ice hockey
- Number of teams: 8

Regular season
- Champions: LB/Essamika
- Runners-up: HK Nik’s Brih Riga

Latvian Hockey League seasons
- ← 1995–96 1997–98 →

The 1996–97 Latvian Hockey League season was the sixth season of the Latvian Hockey League, the top level of ice hockey in Latvia. Eight teams participated in the league, and LB/Essamika won the championship.

== Final round ==
	Club	GP	W	T	L	GF:GA	Pts
1.	LB/Essamika	20	18	2	0	187:43	38
2.	HK Nik’s Brih Riga	20	13	1	6	153:76	27
3.	Essamika Ogre	20	11	3	6	110:64	25
4.	HK Lido Nafta Riga	20	8	2	10	105:112	18

== Relegation round ==
	Club	GP	W	T	L	GF:GA	Pts
5.	Vital Riga	20	11	2	7	106:79	24
6.	HK Laterna Riga	20	8	0	12	88:142	16
7.	Hanza Riga	20	4	1	15	74:146	9
8.	HK Daugava Riga	20	1	1	18	68:229	3
