= 1999–2000 Latvian Hockey League season =

1999–2000 Latvian Hockey League
- League: Latvian Hockey Higher League
- Sport: Ice hockey
- Number of teams: 6

Regular season
- Champions: HK Liepājas Metalurgs
- Runners-up: HK Lido Nafta Riga

Latvian Hockey League seasons
- ← 1998–99 2000–01 →

The 1999–2000 Latvian Hockey League season was the ninth season of the Latvian Hockey League, the top level of ice hockey in Latvia. Six teams participated in the league, and HK Liepājas Metalurgs won the championship. HK Liepājas Metalurgs received a bye until the final, as they played in the Eastern European Hockey League.

== First round ==
	Club	GP	GF:GA	Pts
1.	HK Nik’s Brih Riga	16	95:61	24
2.	HK Lido Nafta Riga	16	89:54	21
3.	Dinamo 81 Riga	16	71:57	18
4.	Essamika Ogre/Juniors Riga	16	64:67	16
5.	LB Prizma Riga	16	55:135	1

== Final round ==
	Club	GP	W	T	L	GF:GA	Pts
1.	HK Liepājas Metalurgs	4	4	0	0	20:1	8
2.	HK Lido Nafta Riga	4	1	1	2	11:15	3
3.	HK Nik’s Brih Riga	4	0	1	3	5:20	1
