= 2002–03 Latvian Hockey League season =

2002–03 Latvian Hockey League
- League: Latvian Hockey Higher League
- Sport: Ice hockey
- Number of teams: 6

Regular season
- Winners: HK Riga 2000

Playoffs

Finals
- Champions: HK Liepājas Metalurgs
- Runners-up: HK Riga 2000

Latvian Hockey League seasons
- ← 2001–02 2003–04 →

The 2002–03 Latvian Hockey League season was the 12th season of the Latvian Hockey League, the top level of ice hockey in Latvia. Six teams participated in the league, and HK Liepājas Metalurgs won the championship.

== Regular season ==
	Club	GP	W	U	L	GF:GA	Pts
1.	HK Riga 2000	20	16	3	1	155:46	35
2.	HK Liepājas Metalurgs	20	16	3	1	147:52	35
3.	ASK/Zemgale	20	9	2	9	119:53	20
4.	HK Vilki Riga	20	9	2	9	82:79	20
5.	Stalkers Daugavpils	20	4	2	14	67:100	10
6.	SK Ozollapas	20	0	0	20	35:246	0

== Playoffs ==
=== Quarterfinals ===
- SK Ozollapas - ASK/Zemgale 5:3/2:16
- Stalkers Daugavpils - HK Vilki Riga 1:3/2:3

=== Semifinals ===
- HK Vilki Riga - HK Riga 2000 1:1/1:4
- ASK/Zemgale - HK Liepājas Metalurgs 1:10/1:6

=== 3rd place ===
- HK Vilki Riga - ASK/Zemgale 6:4/3:3

=== Final ===
- HK Liepājas Metalurgs - HK Riga 2000 4:3/3:3
