= HK Lido Nafta Riga =

Ice hockey team in Riga, Latvia

HK Lido/Nafta Rīga
- City: Riga, Latvia
- League: Latvian Hockey League
- Founded: 1994
- Folded: 2001
- Home arena: Rīgas Sporta pils

HK Lido Nafta Riga was an ice hockey team in Riga, Latvia. They played in the Latvian Hockey League and the Latvian Second League from 1994–2001.

== History ==
The club was founded in 1994, and took part in the Latvian Second Hockey League (Pirmā līga), which they won in 1996, and were thus promoted to the Latvian Hockey League. The club then took part in the LHL, which they finished second in 1998, 1999, and 2000. In 2001, the club finished in third place, and folded after the season.

== Notable players ==
- Agris Saviels
- Mārtiņš Karsums
- Edgars Masaļskis
- Sergejs Povecerovskis
- Lauris Dārziņš
- Leonīds Beresņevs
