= HK Nik's Brih Riga =

Latvian ice hockey club

- City: Riga, Latvia
- League: Latvian Hockey League
- Founded: 1987
- Home arena: Rīgas Sporta pils
- Colours: Black, Yellow, White

HK Nik's Brih Riga was an ice hockey team in Riga, Latvia. They played in the Latvian Hockey League.

== History ==
The club was founded in 1987. Starting in 1992, the club participated in the Latvian Hockey League. The club won the Latvian Hockey League three times, and reached the finals twice. They participated in the 1996 IIHF Federation Cup, where they finished third in Group C.

The team was dissolved in 2000, and two new teams were founded in Riga, Juniors Riga and Vilki OP/LaRocca. A large number of Nik's Brih players went to play for Vilki.

== Results ==
- 1992/93: 4th place
- 1993/94: 2nd place
- 1994/95: 1st place
- 1995/96: 3rd place
- 1996/97: 2nd place
- 1997/98: 1st place
- 1998/99: 1st place
- 1999/2000: 3rd place
- 2000/2001: Cancelled

== Notable players ==
- Viktors Durnovs
- Sergejs Nikitins
- Ervīns Muštukovs
