= 2001–02 Latvian Hockey League season =

2001–02 Latvian Hockey League
- League: Latvian Hockey Higher League
- Sport: Ice hockey
- Teams: 6

Regular season
- Winners: HK Liepājas Metalurgs

Playoffs

Finals
- Champions: HK Liepājas Metalurgs
- Runners-up: HK Riga 2000

Latvian Hockey League seasons
- ← 2000–01 2002–03 →

The 2001–02 Latvian Hockey League season was the 11th season of the Latvian Hockey League, the top level of ice hockey in Latvia. Six teams participated in the league, and HK Liepājas Metalurgs won the championship.

== Regular season ==
	Club	GP	W	U	L	GF:GA	Pts
1.	HK Liepājas Metalurgs	20	19	0	1	163:33	38
2.	HK Riga 2000	20	15	1	4	160:50	31
3.	HK Vilki Riga	20	11	1	8	103:63	23
4.	LB Prizma Riga	20	7	0	13	75:130	14
5.	Stalkers/Juniors Daugavpils	20	3	1	16	37:139	7
6.	SK Ozollapas	20	3	1	16	60:183	7

== Playoffs ==
Quarterfinal
4	LB Prizma Riga	4
6	SK Ozollapas	5
3	HK Vilki Riga
5	Stalkers/Juniors Daugavpils

Semifinal
1	HK Liepājas Metalurgs	16
6	SK Ozollapas	1
2	HK Riga 2000	4
3	HK Vilki Riga	2

Final (Best of Three)
1	HK Liepājas Metalurgs	2
2	HK Riga 2000	0
Third place
3	HK Vilki Riga	2
6	SK Ozollapas	0
