= 2000–01 Latvian Hockey League season =

2000–01 Latvian Hockey League
- League: Latvian Hockey Higher League
- Sport: Ice hockey
- Number of teams: 7

Regular season
- Champions: HK Riga 2000
- Runners-up: HK Liepājas Metalurgs

Latvian Hockey League seasons
- ← 1999–2000 2001–02 →

The 2000–01 Latvian Hockey League season was the tenth season of the Latvian Hockey League, the top level of ice hockey in Latvia. Seven teams participated in the league, and HK Riga 2000 won the championship.

== Standings ==
	Club	GP	W	T	L	GF:GA	Pts
1.	HK Riga 2000	24	22	1	1	200:44	45
2.	HK Liepājas Metalurgs	24	19	2	3	181:46	40
3.	HK Lido Nafta Riga	24	13	3	8	139:91	29
4.	HK Vilki Riga	24	13	1	10	129:77	27
5.	LB Prizma Riga	24	8	1	15	96:153	17
6.	Kandava Daugavpils	24	2	2	20	69:245	6
7.	Stalkers/Juniors Daugavpils	24	1	2	21	48:206	4
