= Energija Hockey/HC Klaipėda =

Ice hockey team in Kaunas, Lithuania

- City: Elektrėnai, Lithuania
- League: Lithuania Hockey League
- Operated: 2020
- Home arena: Elektrėnai Ice Palace & Klaipėda Akropolis (capacity: 2,000 & 100)
- Colours: Red, white, light blue
- Head coach: Valdas Skadauskas
- Website: Energija Hockey/HC Klaipėda

Energija Hockey/HC Klaipėda is a professional ice hockey team located in Elektrėnai, Lithuania, which plays in the Lithuania Hockey League, the top tier of ice hockey in Lithuania. They play home games at the Elektrėnai Ice Palace and the Klaipėda Akropolis.

== History ==
Energija Hockey/HC Klaipėda was founded in 2020 by coach Algis Poškis, and immediately joined the Lithuania Hockey League. In 2019 HC Klaipėda had partnered with fellow NLRL team Kaunas Baltų Ainiai, however, in the offseason they teamed up with the new team from Elektrėnai. Their maiden season in the NLRL was a torrid one, as of January 28, 2021 they have lost every game. Timur Muginov scored the first goal in franchise history, scoring in the first period against SC Energija.

== Roster ==
Updated January 28, 2021.

Goaltenders
Number		Player	Catches	Acquired	Place of Birth
1	(Lithuania)	Nikita Kuzminov	L	2020	Klaipėda, Lithuania
33	(Lithuania)	Domas Makarevicius	R	2020	-

Defencemen
Number		Player	Shoots	Acquired	Place of Birth
3	(Lithuania)	Rokas Arbačiauskas	L	2020	Elektrėnai, Lithuania
10	(Lithuania)	Matas Mikalauskas	L	2020	-
13	(Russia)	Artiom Sumin	R	2020	-
14	(Lithuania)	Maksim Kondratjev	R	2020	-
16	(Lithuania)	Maksim Sačiuk	R	2020	-
21	(Lithuania)	Oleg Peliušenok	L	2020	Klaipėda, Lithuania
29	(Lithuania)	Ugnius Šimbelis	L	2020	-
37	(Lithuania)	Matas Palšauskas	L	2020	-
47	(Lithuania)	Artur Podolskij	L	2020	-

Forwards
Number		Player	Shoots	Position	Acquired	Place of Birth
7	(Lithuania)	Ilja Michalevič	L	F	2020	-
11	(Lithuania)	Darius Verbickas	R	RW	2020	-
12	(Lithuania)	Kipras Grabliauskas	L	F	2020	-
15	(Lithuania)	Artūr Sapožnikov	R	F	2020	-
17	(Russia)	Timur Muginov	-	F	2020	Ufa, Russia
18	(Lithuania)	Aleksandr Zavirochin	L	F	2020	-
23	(Lithuania)	Artem Redko	R	F	2020	-
27	(Lithuania)	Kiril Bogdanov	L	F	2020	-
52	(Lithuania)	Ilja Kuznecov	L	F	2020	-
69	(Lithuania)	Dominykas Škadauskas	R	F	2020	Elektrėnai, Lithuania
88	(Lithuania)	Anatolij Sedura	L	F	2020	-
91	(Lithuania)	Arnas Palšauskas	L	F	2020	-
