= 2026–27 IIHF Continental Cup =

Tournament details
- Dates: 16 October 2026 – 17 January 2027
- Teams: 14

The 2026–27 Continental Cup is the 29th edition of the IIHF Continental Cup, Europe's second-tier ice hockey club competition organised by International Ice Hockey Federation. The competition began on 16 October 2026, and the final round will be played from 14 to 17 January 2027.

== Qualified teams ==
Team	Qualification
Enter in the second round
(Denmark) Herlev Eagles	2025–26 Metal Ligaen runners-up
(United Kingdom) Belfast Giants	2025-26 EIHL champions
(Kazakhstan) Nomad Astana	2025–26 Kazakhstan Hockey Championship champions
(Poland) GKS Katowice	2025–26 Polska Hokej Liga runners-up
(France) Dragons de Rouen	2025–26 Ligue Magnus regular season winners
(Italy) Asiago Hockey 1935	2025-26 IHL – Elite champions
Enter in the first round
(Ukraine) Sokil Kyiv	2025–26 Ukrainian Hockey Championship champions
(Romania) CSM Corona Brașov	2025–26 Romanian Hockey League runners-up (Note: CSM Corona Brașov will represent the Romanian Hockey League after the champions Gyergyói HK decided not to participate in the competition.)
(Hungary) Budapest JAHC	2025–26 OB I bajnokság champions
(Estonia) Viru Sputnik	2025–26 Meistriliiga champions
(Croatia) KHL Zagreb	2025–26 Croatian Ice Hockey League runners-up
(Lithuania) Energija Elektrėnai	2025–26 Lithuania Hockey League champions
(Spain) Club Hielo Jaca	2025–26 LNHH champions
(Latvia) HK Mogo	2025–26 Latvian Hockey League champions

== First round ==
=== Group A ===
The Group A tournament was played in Elektrėnai, Lithuania, from 16 to 18 October 2026.

Pos	Team	Pld	W	OTW	OTL	L	GF	GA	GD	Pts	Qualification
1	(Latvia) HK Mogo	3	2	1	0	0	18	5	+13	8	Second round
2	(Ukraine) Sokil Kyiv	3	2	0	1	0	14	5	+9	7	
3	(Lithuania) Energija Elektrėnai (H)	3	1	0	0	2	9	11	−2	3	
4	(Spain) Club Hielo Jaca	3	0	0	0	3	2	22	−20	0	

Source: IIHF
(H) Host

All times are local (UTC+3).

16 October 2026; 15:00	Sokil Kyiv (Ukraine)	7–0 (1–0, 3–0, 3–0)	(Spain) Club Hielo Jaca	Elektrėnai Ice Palace, Elektrėnai; Attendance: 67

Game reference
27 min	Penalties	6 min
71	Shots	5

16 October 2026; 19:00	Energija Elektrėnai (Lithuania)	1–6 (0–1, 1–2, 0–3)	(Latvia) HK Mogo	Elektrėnai Ice Palace, Elektrėnai; Attendance: 459

Game reference
2 min	Penalties	4 min
22	Shots	46

17 October 2026; 13:00	HK Mogo (Latvia)	8–1 (2–0, 3–0, 3–1)	(Spain) Club Hielo Jaca	Elektrėnai Ice Palace, Elektrėnai; Attendance: 98

Game reference
6 min	Penalties	8 min
49	Shots	14

17 October 2026; 17:00	Sokil Kyiv (Ukraine)	4–1 (1–0, 1–1, 2–0)	(Lithuania) Energija Elektrėnai	Elektrėnai Ice Palace, Elektrėnai; Attendance: 544

Game reference
6 min	Penalties	10 min
27	Shots	19

18 October 2026; 13:00	HK Mogo (Latvia)	4–3 OT (0–0, 1–2, 2–1) (OT: 1–0)	(Ukraine) Sokil Kyiv	Elektrėnai Ice Palace, Elektrėnai; Attendance: 135

Game reference
4 min	Penalties	2 min
40	Shots	21

18 October 2026; 17:00	Club Hielo Jaca (Spain)	1–7 (0–2, 0–3, 1–2)	(Lithuania) Energija Elektrėnai	Elektrėnai Ice Palace, Elektrėnai; Attendance: 498

Game reference
6 min	Penalties	6 min
15	Shots	48

=== Group B ===
The Group B tournament was played in Kohtla-Järve, Estonia, from 16 to 18 October 2026.

Pos	Team	Pld	W	OTW	OTL	L	GF	GA	GD	Pts	Qualification
1	(Romania) CSM Corona Brașov	3	3	0	0	0	24	7	+17	9	Second round
2	(Hungary) BJA HC	3	2	0	0	1	23	6	+17	6	
3	(Estonia) Viru Sputnik (H)	3	1	0	0	2	12	18	−6	3	
4	(Croatia) KHL Zagreb	3	0	0	0	3	3	31	−28	0	

Source: IIHF
(H) Host

All times are local (UTC+3).

16 October 2026; 15:30	KHL Zagreb (Croatia)	3–11 (0–5, 3–5, 0–1)	(Romania) CSM Corona Brașov	Kohtla-Järve Ice Hall, Kohtla-Järve; Attendance: 160

Game reference
4 min	Penalties	4 min
19	Shots	44

16 October 2026; 19:00	BJA HC (Hungary)	9–2 (3–0, 4–1, 2–1)	(Estonia) Viru Sputnik	Kohtla-Järve Ice Hall, Kohtla-Järve; Attendance: 654

Game reference
10 min	Penalties	10 min
53	Shots	22

17 October 2026; 15:30	BJA HC (Hungary)	12–0 (6–0, 1–0, 5–0)	(Croatia) KHL Zagreb	Kohtla-Järve Ice Hall, Kohtla-Järve; Attendance: 110

Game reference
6 min	Penalties	8 min
50	Shots	8

17 October 2026; 19:00	CSM Corona Brașov (Romania)	9–2 (2–1, 3–1, 4–0)	(Estonia) Viru Sputnik	Kohtla-Järve Ice Hall, Kohtla-Järve; Attendance: 956

Game reference
10 min	Penalties	10 min
39	Shots	18

18 October 2026; 15:30	CSM Corona Brașov (Romania)	4–2 (1–0, 2–2, 1–0)	(Hungary) BJA HC	Kohtla-Järve Ice Hall, Kohtla-Järve; Attendance: 308

Game reference
10 min	Penalties	26 min
31	Shots	33

18 October 2026; 19:00	Viru Sputnik (Estonia)	8–0 (2–0, 1–0, 5–0)	(Croatia) KHL Zagreb	Kohtla-Järve Ice Hall, Kohtla-Järve; Attendance: 923

Game reference
16 min	Penalties	16 min
42	Shots	21

== Second round ==
=== Group C ===
The Group C tournament was played in Rouen, France, from 13 to 15 November 2026.

Pos	Team	Pld	W	OTW	OTL	L	GF	GA	GD	Pts	Qualification
1	(France) Dragons de Rouen (H)	3	3	0	0	0	14	9	+5	9	Final round
2	(Poland) GKS Katowice	3	1	1	0	1	10	9	+1	5	Final round
3	(United Kingdom) Belfast Giants	3	1	0	1	1	13	8	+5	4	Final round
4	(Latvia) HK Mogo	3	0	0	0	3	5	16	−11	0	

Source: IIHF
(H) Host

All times are local (UTC+1).

13 November 2026; 15:00	Belfast Giants (United Kingdom)	8–0 (1–0, 5–0, 2–0)	(Latvia) HK Mogo	Centre sportif Guy-Boissière, Rouen; Attendance: 1,012

Game reference
6 min	Penalties	0 min
34	Shots	21

13 November 2026; 20:00	GKS Katowice (Poland)	3–5 (1–3, 2–1, 0–1)	(France) Dragons de Rouen	Centre sportif Guy-Boissière, Rouen; Attendance: 3,029

Game reference
2 min	Penalties	6 min
31	Shots	32

14 November 2026; 15:00	GKS Katowice (Poland)	3–1 (0–0, 1–0, 2–1)	(Latvia) HK Mogo	Centre sportif Guy-Boissière, Rouen; Attendance: 1,515

Game reference
6 min	Penalties	6 min
32	Shots	42

14 November 2026; 20:00	Dragons de Rouen (France)	4–2 (1–0, 0–1, 3–1)	(United Kingdom) Belfast Giants	Centre sportif Guy-Boissière, Rouen; Attendance: 3,029

Game reference
14 min	Penalties	8 min
21	Shots	36

15 November 2026; 13:00	Belfast Giants (United Kingdom)	3–4 GWS (1–1, 0–1, 2–1) (OT: 0–0) (SO: 0–1)	(Poland) GKS Katowice	Centre sportif Guy-Boissière, Rouen; Attendance: 2,200

Game reference
0 min	Penalties	10 min
44	Shots	23

15 November 2026; 18:00	HK Mogo (Latvia)	4–5 (2–2, 2–0, 0–3)	(France) Dragons de Rouen	Centre sportif Guy-Boissière, Rouen; Attendance: 3,029

Game reference
10 min	Penalties	4 min
23	Shots	30

=== Group D ===
The Group D tournament was played in Asiago, Italy, from 13 to 15 November 2026.

Pos	Team	Pld	W	OTW	OTL	L	GF	GA	GD	Pts	Qualification
1	(Kazakhstan) Nomad Astana	3	3	0	0	0	11	4	+7	9	Final round
2	(Denmark) Herlev Eagles	3	2	0	0	1	7	6	+1	6	Final round
3	(Romania) CSM Corona Brașov	3	1	0	0	2	8	8	0	3	Final round
4	(Italy) Asiago Hockey 1935 (H)	3	0	0	0	3	5	13	−8	0	

Source: IIHF
(H) Host

All times are local (UTC+1).

13 November 2026; 16:30	Herlev Eagles (Denmark)	2–1 (1–0, 1–1, 0–0)	(Romania) CSM Corona Brașov	Pala Hodegart, Asiago; Attendance: 245

Game reference
4 min	Penalties	6 min
39	Shots	30

13 November 2026; 20:00	Asiago Hockey 1935 (Italy)	2–3 (1–1, 1–1, 0–1)	(Kazakhstan) Nomad Astana	Pala Hodegart, Asiago; Attendance: 1,640

Game reference
8 min	Penalties	14 min
29	Shots	28

14 November 2026; 16:30	Nomad Astana (Kazakhstan)	5–2 (1–1, 3–1, 1–0)	(Romania) CSM Corona Brașov	Pala Hodegart, Asiago; Attendance: 285

Game reference
8 min	Penalties	8 min
42	Shots	30

14 November 2026; 20:00	Herlev Eagles (Denmark)	5–2 (2–0, 0–2, 3–0)	(Italy) Asiago Hockey 1935	Pala Hodegart, Asiago; Attendance: 2,270

Game reference
8 min	Penalties	8 min
44	Shots	18

15 November 2026; 16:30	Nomad Astana (Kazakhstan)	3–0 (2–0, 0–0, 1–0)	(Denmark) Herlev Eagles	Pala Hodegart, Asiago; Attendance: 196

Game reference
10 min	Penalties	4 min
23	Shots	31

15 November 2026; 20:00	CSM Corona Brașov (Romania)	5–1 (1–1, 1–0, 3–0)	(Italy) Asiago Hockey 1935	Pala Hodegart, Asiago; Attendance: 1,730

Game reference
10 min	Penalties	6 min
48	Shots	21

== Final round ==
The final tournament will be played from 14 to 17 January 2027.

== See also ==
- 2026–27 Champions Hockey League
