= Nerijus Ališauskas =

Lithuanian ice hockey player (born 1991)

- Born: 6 June 1991 (age 35) Elektrėnai, Lithuania
- Height: 1.84 m (6 ft 0 in)
- Weight: 84 kg (185 lb; 13 st 3 lb)
- Position: Defence
- Catches: Right
- SVK team Former teams: Prešov; SC Energija II; Liepājas Metalurgs; Almaty; Temirtau; Dinamo Riga; Slovan Bratislava; Spišská Nová Ves
- National team: Lithuania
- NHL draft: Undrafted
- Playing career: 2006–present

Nerijus Ališauskas (born 6 June 1991) is a Lithuanian professional ice hockey player who is a defenceman for Prešov of the Slovak Extraliga.

He plays as a defenceman and was previously a member of SC Energija II, Liepājas Metalurgs, Almaty, Temirtau, Dinamo Riga, and Slovan Bratislava, and Spišská Nová Ves.

== Playing career ==
Ališauskas first played hockey at the age of eight. He started his career with hometown SC Energija farm team, SC Energija II, and played for them during the 2006–07 season. From 2007 to 2013, he played for Liepājas Metalurgs and its farm teams. Ališauskas spent the 2013–14 season with EV Füssen of German Oberliga. After the season he moved to Kazakhstan Hockey Championship and played for Almaty and Temirtau, also spending two seasons with Saryarka Karagandy of the Supreme Hockey League (VHL).

On 4 July 2017, Ališauskas joined the training camp of Dinamo Riga of the Kontinental Hockey League (KHL). On 16 August, it was announced that Ališauskas signed a one-year deal with Dinamo Riga. He was the second Lithuanian to play in the KHL, following Darius Kasparaitis. On 14 August 2018, Ališauskas re-signed with Dinamo Riga. On 30 July 2020, Ališauskas signed a one-year deal with Slovan Bratislava of the Slovak Extraliga. On 2 May 2021, after the conclusion of the 2020–21 season, he returned to Dinamo Riga of the KHL. On 15 February 2022, his contract with Dinamo Riga was terminated and he signed with Vita Hästen of HockeyAllsvenskan. On 26 June, Ališauskas signed a one-year deal with Spišská Nová Ves of the Slovak Extraliga. On 18 May 2023, he signed a one-year contract extension with Spišská Nová Ves, and on 12 December, he was re-signed to a further one-year extension. On 1 May 2025, he was once again re-signed to a one-year extension.

On 18 May 2026, Ališauskas signed a one-year contract with Prešov of the Slovak Extraliga.

== International play ==
Ališauskas was a member of Lithuania's under-18 and under-20 national teams from 2006 until 2011. From 2011, he has been a member of the senior national team, though he missed the 2017 World Championship Division I tournament.

== Career statistics ==
=== Regular season and playoffs ===
			Regular season					Playoffs
Season	Team	League	GP	G	A	P	PIM	GP	G	A	P	PIM
2006–07	SC Energija II	LHL	1	0	0	0	6	—	—	—	—	—
2007–08	Liepājas Metalurgs U18	LVA 18	25	0	6	6	18	—	—	—	—	—
2007–08	Liepājas Metalurgs	LHHL	14	1	0	1	14	—	—	—	—	—
2008–09	Liepājas Metalurgs U20	LVA 20	15	2	1	3	12	—	—	—	—	—
2009–10	Liepājas Metalurgs	BXL	31	1	1	2	14	—	—	—	—	—
2009–10	Liepājas Metalurgs 2	LHHL	6	1	2	3	8	—	—	—	—	—
2010–11	Liepājas Metalurgs	BXL	47	0	7	7	36	3	1	1	2	4
2010–11	Liepājas Metalurgs 2	LHHL	9	0	2	2	6	—	—	—	—	—
2011–12	Liepājas Metalurgs	BXL	49	4	9	13	42	4	0	0	0	4
2012–13	Liepājas Metalurgs	BXL	47	0	8	8	84	3	0	1	1	4
2013–14	EV Füssen	3.GBun	23	7	22	29	36	—	—	—	—	—
2014–15	HK Almaty	KHC	54	17	18	35	50	7	1	3	4	6
2015–16	Saryarka Karagandy	VHL	44	2	11	13	48	16	2	2	4	10
2015–16	Arystan Temirtau	KHC	3	0	1	1	2	—	—	—	—	—
2016–17	Saryarka Karagandy	VHL	47	4	15	19	38	11	1	2	3	8
2016–17	Arystan Temirtau	KHC	—	—	—	—	—	14	2	3	5	4
2017–18	Dinamo Riga	KHL	51	0	3	3	16	—	—	—	—	—
2018–19	Dinamo Riga	KHL	48	2	6	8	22	—	—	—	—	—
2019–20	Dinamo Riga	KHL	53	5	2	7	20	—	—	—	—	—
2020–21	Slovan Bratislava	SVK	48	2	10	12	30	9	1	0	1	6
2021–22	Dinamo Riga	KHL	25	0	2	2	10	—	—	—	—	—
2021–22	Vita Hästen	Allsv	11	1	2	3	2	—	—	—	—	—
2022–23	Spišská Nová Ves	SVK	47	3	11	14	22	14	0	0	0	8
2023–24	Spišská Nová Ves	SVK	50	2	12	14	51	15	1	5	6	6
2024–25	Spišská Nová Ves	SVK	51	4	5	9	39	6	0	0	0	0
2025–26	Spišská Nová Ves	SVK	50	2	5	7	20	4	0	0	0	25
KHL totals			177	7	13	20	68	—	—	—	—	—
