= Aivaras Bendžius =

Lithuanian ice hockey player (born 1993)

- Born: 26 January 1993 (age 33) Elektrėnai, Lithuania
- Height: 6 ft 3 in (191 cm)
- Weight: 205 lb (93 kg; 14 st 9 lb)
- Position: Forward
- Shoots: Left
- OHL team Former teams: Energija/GV Elektrėnai; Ilves; HDD Jesenice; Nijmegen Devils; Éléphants de Chambéry; Mechelen Golden Sharks; Hockey Punks Vilnius; HC Kaunas City
- National team: Lithuania
- NHL draft: Undrafted
- Playing career: 2013–present

Aivaras Bendžius (born 26 January 1993) is a Lithuanian ice hockey player.

Bendžius made his SM-liiga debut playing with Ilves during the 2012–13 SM-liiga season.

== Career statistics ==
=== Regular season and playoffs ===
			Regular season					Playoffs
Season	Team	League	GP	G	A	Pts	PIM	GP	G	A	Pts	PIM
2009–10	Energija Elektrėnai	Latvia	17	3	1	4	4	—	—	—	—	—
2010–11	Energija Elektrėnai	Latvia	31	8	11	19	18	—	—	—	—	—
2011–12	Energija Elektrėnai	Latvia	34	21	17	38	22	—	—	—	—	—
2011–12	Energija Elektrėnai–2	Lithuania	15	16	16	32	22	—	—	—	—	—
2012–13	Ilves U20	Jr. A SM-liiga	21	0	6	6	4	—	—	—	—	—
2012–13	Ilves	SM-liiga	1	0	0	0	0	—	—	—	—	—
2012–13	Energija Elektrėnai	Lithuania	9	7	4	11	8	—	—	—	—	—
2013–14	Energija Elektrėnai	Belarus–2	46	28	19	47	71	5	4	1	5	6
2014–15	Energija Elektrėnai	Belarus–2	37	28	22	50	92	3	1	1	2	4
2015–16	Energija Elektrėnai	Belarus–2	24	17	12	29	30	—	—	—	—	—
2015–16	HDD Jesenice	INL	8	0	2	2	0	8	0	1	1	2
2015–16	HDD Jesenice	SIHL	3	1	3	4	0	10	2	0	2	0
2015–16	Energija Elektrėnai	Lithuania	3	1	3	4	0	10	2	0	2	0
2016–17	Energija Elektrėnai	Belarus–2	41	30	30	60	125	3	1	0	1	4
2016–17	Energija Elektrėnai	Lithuania	17	29	24	53	34	4	1	3	4	75
2017–18	Nijmegen Devils	BeNe League	24	22	16	38	37	5	4	0	4	2
2018–19	Éléphants de Chambéry	France-2	3	0	0	0	2	—	—	—	—	—
2018–19	Mechelen Golden Sharks	BeNe League	15	10	8	18	16	—	—	—	—	—
2019-20	Hockey Punks Vilnius	Lithuania	18	20	17	37	16	3	0	2	2	2
2020-21	Hockey Punks Vilnius	Lithuania	17	12	29	41	12	10	3	4	7	12
2021-22	Hockey Punks Vilnius	Lithuania	20	20	21	41	35	4	4	2	6	8
2022-23	HC Kaunas City	Latvia	31	25	18	43	32	5	2	2	4	0
2023-24	Hockey Punks Vilnius	Latvia	4	0	2	2	4	—	—	—	—	—
2023-24	HC Kaunas City	Latvia	26	7	8	15	40	—	—	—	—	—
2024-25	Energija/GV Elektrėnai	Latvia	34	18	6	24	58	—	—	—	—	—
2025-26	Energija/GV Elektrėnai	Latvia	36	11	13	24	24	—	—	—	—	—

=== International ===
Junior – U18

Year	Team	Event	Result	GP	G	A	Pts	PIM
2009	Lithuania	WJC18 D1A	5th	5	1	1	2	0
2010	Lithuania	WJC18 D1B	6th	5	2	0	2	2
2011	Lithuania	WJC18 D2B	3rd	5	4	3	7	2
U18 totals				15	7	4	11	4

Junior – U20

Year	Team	Event	Result	GP	G	A	Pts	PIM
2010	Lithuania	WJC20 D2B	1st	5	0	2	2	4
2011	Lithuania	WJC20 D1B	6th	5	0	0	0	2
2012	Lithuania	WJC20 D2A	2nd	5	2	2	4	6
2013	Lithuania	WJC20 D2A	5th	5	1	2	3	25
U20 totals				20	3	6	9	37

Senior

Year	Team	Event	Result	GP	G	A	Pts	PIM
2012	Lithuania	WC D1B	5th	5	1	1	2	2
2012	Lithuania	OGQ	NQ	3	0	1	1	0
2013	Lithuania	WC D1B	5th	5	1	3	4	6
2014	Lithuania	WC D1B	3rd	5	0	0	0	2
2015	Lithuania	WC D1B	3rd	5	2	0	2	4
2016	Lithuania	WC D1B	3rd	5	0	0	0	2
2017	Lithuania	WC D1B	3rd	5	2	1	3	0
2019	Lithuania	WC D1A	6th	5	0	0	0	0
2020	Lithuania	OGQ	NQ	3	0	1	1	0
2022	Lithuania	WC D1A	3rd	4	1	0	1	6
2023	Lithuania	WC D1A	6th	2	1	1	2	0
2024	Lithuania	OGQ	NQ	3	0	1	1	0
2024	Lithuania	WC D1B	2nd	5	0	0	0	4
2025	Lithuania	WC D1B	1st	5	1	1	2	2
2026	Lithuania	WC D1A	5th	5	1	0	1	0
Senior totals				68	12	10	22	32
