= 1999–2000 Lithuanian Hockey League season =

Lithuanian ice hockey league season

The 1999–2000 Lithuanian Hockey League season was the ninth season of the Lithuanian Hockey League, the top level of ice hockey in Lithuania. Four teams participated in the league, and Vyltis Elektrenai won the championship. Vyltis was the first team to win the league other than SC Energija.

== Standings ==
	Club	GP	W	T	L	GF–GA	Pts
1.	Viltis Elektrenai	18	15	0	3	128:49	45
2.	SC Energija	18	14	0	4	191:63	42
3.	Nemunas Rokiskis	18	7	0	11	104:126	20
4.	Poseidonas Elektrenai	18	0	0	18	46:234	0

Source: Elite Prospects
