= 1994–95 Lithuanian Hockey League season =

Lithuanian ice hockey league season

The 1994–95 Lithuanian Hockey League season was the fourth season of the Lithuanian Hockey League, the top level of ice hockey in Lithuania. Six teams participated in the league, and SC Energija won the championship.

== Standings ==
	Club	GP	W	T	L	GF–GA	Pts
1.	SC Energija	19	18	1	0	207:45	37
2.	Germantas Telsiai	20	13	1	6	107:81	27
3.	Solvita Kaunas	20	11	1	8	143:116	23
4.	Lithuanian Juniors	20	10	1	9	133:98	21
5.	Poseidonas Elektronai	20	3	0	17	74:211	6
6.	Nemunas Rokiskis	19	2	0	17	70:183	4

Source: Elite Prospects
