= 1996–97 Lithuanian Hockey League season =

Lithuanian ice hockey league season

The 1996–97 Lithuanian Hockey League season was the sixth season of the Lithuanian Hockey League, the top level of ice hockey in Lithuania. Five teams participated in the league, and SC Energija won the championship. SC Energija received a bye until the finals, as they played in the Eastern European Hockey League.

== Regular season ==
	Club	GP	W	T	L	GF–GA	Pts
1.	Poseidonas Elektrenai	18	12	2	4	87:62	26
2.	Germantas Telsiai	18	9	2	7	70:53	20
3.	Nemunas Rokiskis	18	7	0	11	72:79	14
4.	Viltis Elektrenai	18	6	0	12	67:102	12

Source: Elite Prospects

== Playoffs ==
=== 3rd place ===
- Germantas Telsiai - Nemunas Rokiskis 4:4/3:4

=== Final ===
- SC Energija - Poseidonas Elektrenai 16:2/16:0
