= 1995–96 Lithuanian Hockey League season =

Lithuanian ice hockey league season

The 1995–96 Lithuanian Hockey League season was the fifth season of the Lithuanian Hockey League, the top level of ice hockey in Lithuania. Five teams participated in the league, and SC Energija won the championship. SC Energija received a bye until the finals, as they played in the Eastern European Hockey League.

== Regular season ==
	Club	GP	W	T	L	GF–GA	Pts
1.	Germantas Telsiai	11	7	0	4	57:48	14
2.	Poseidonas Elektrenai	11	5	1	5	51:60	11
3.	Nemunas Rokiskis	12	4	3	5	57:58	11
4.	Vytis Elektrenai	12	4	2	6	58:57	10

Source: Elite Prospects

== Playoffs ==
=== 3rd place ===
- Poseidonas Elektrenai - Nemunas Rokiskis 5:4/5:1

=== Final ===
- SC Energija - Germantas Telsiai 6:2/8:1
