= 1993–94 Lithuanian Hockey League season =

Lithuanian ice hockey league season

The 1993–94 Lithuanian Hockey League season was the third season of the Lithuanian Hockey League, the top level of ice hockey in Lithuania. Five teams participated in the league, and SC Energija won the championship.

== Standings ==
| | Club | GP | W | T | L | GF–GA | Pts |
|---|---|---|---|---|---|---|---|
| 1. | SC Energija | 16 | 16 | 0 | 0 | 172:44 | 32 |
| 2. | Poseidonas Elektrenai | 16 | 9 | 0 | 7 | 104:89 | 18 |
| 3. | Lithuanian Juniors | 15 | 7 | 1 | 7 | 81:84 | 15 |
| 4. | Nemunas Rokiskis | 16 | 3 | 2 | 11 | 58:126 | 8 |
| 5. | Germantas Telsiai | 15 | 2 | 1 | 12 | 50:122 | 5 |

Source: Elite Prospects
