= 1997–98 Lithuanian Hockey League season =

Lithuanian ice hockey league season

The 1997–98 Lithuanian Hockey League season was the seventh season of the Lithuanian Hockey League, the top level of ice hockey in Lithuania. Six teams participated in the league, and SC Energija won the championship. SC Energija received a bye until the finals, as they played in the Eastern European Hockey League.

== Regular season ==
	Club	GP	W	T	L	GF–GA	Pts
1.	Lithuanian Juniors	16	13	0	3	112:47	26
2.	Poseidonas Elektrenai	16	10	0	6	91:77	20
3.	Nemunas Rokiskis	16	10	0	6	85:75	20
4.	Kalyanas Kaunas	16	6	0	10	62:88	12
5.	Germantas Telsiai	16	1	0	15	43:106	2

Source: Elite Prospects

== Playoffs ==
=== 3rd place ===
- Poseidonas Elektrenai - Nemunas Rokiskis 7:2/1:2

=== Final ===
- SC Energija - Lithuanian Juniors 9:2/9:5
