= 2007–08 Lithuanian Hockey League season =

Lithuanian ice hockey league season

The 2007–08 Lithuanian Hockey League season was the 17th season of the Lithuanian Hockey League, the top level of ice hockey in Lithuania. Nine teams participated in the league, and SC Energija won the championship. SC Energija received a bye until the finals, as they played in the Latvian Hockey League.

== Regular season ==
| | Club | GP | W | OTW | OTL | L | GF–GA | Pts |
|---|---|---|---|---|---|---|---|---|
| 1. | SM Poseidonas Elektrenai | 14 | 12 | 0 | 1 | 1 | 113:40 | 37 |
| 2. | Sporto Centras Elektronai | 14 | 11 | 1 | 1 | 1 | 109:39 | 36 |
| 3. | Maximum Vilnius | 14 | 9 | 0 | 1 | 4 | 94:56 | 28 |
| 4. | Vandesta-Vilkai Vilnius | 14 | 7 | 2 | 0 | 5 | 128:73 | 25 |
| 5. | LAE Kauno | 14 | 7 | 0 | 1 | 6 | 101:51 | 22 |
| 6. | Sareme Vilnius | 14 | 4 | 1 | 0 | 9 | 79:128 | 14 |
| 7. | Lokiai Vilnius | 14 | 2 | 0 | 0 | 12 | 45:103 | 6 |
| 8. | Meteoras Vilnius | 14 | 0 | 0 | 0 | 14 | 46:225 | 0 |

Source: Elite Prospects

== Final ==
- SM Poseidonas Elektrenai - SC Energija 3:12
