= 2008–09 Lithuanian Hockey League season =

Lithuanian ice hockey league season

The 2008–09 Lithuanian Hockey League season was the 18th season of the Lithuanian Hockey League, the top level of ice hockey in Lithuania. Four teams participated in Group A of the league, and SC Energija won the championship. Group B, which consisted of six teams, was won by LRK Kedainiai.

== Group A ==
	Club	GP	W	OTW	OTL	L	GF–GA	Pts
1.	SC Energija	12	12	0	0	0	102:33	36
2.	SM Poseidonas Elektrenai	12	5	1	1	5	56:51	18
3.	Sporto Centras Elektrenai	12	3	2	0	7	39:69	13
4.	Pioner Kaliningrad	12	0	1	3	8	25:69	5

Source: Elite Prospects

== Group B ==
	Club	GP	W	OTW	OTL	L	GF–GA	Pts
1.	LRK Kedainai	9	9	0	0	0	84:17	27
2.	Stumbras Kaunas	9	8	0	0	1	96:14	24
3.	Sparnai LRK Kaunas	10	6	0	0	4	59:39	18
4.	Velniai Kaunas	9	2	0	0	7	23:82	6
5.	Suduva Marijampole	8	1	0	1	6	18:70	4
6.	Olympas Panevezys	8	0	1	0	7	18:84	2
