= 2010–11 Lithuanian Hockey League season =

Lithuanian ice hockey league season

The 2010–11 Lithuanian Hockey League season was the 20th season of the Lithuanian Hockey League. Sporto Centras Elektrenai won the championship for the second season in a row. The league was divided into A and B divisions. 10 teams participated in the A Division, and 17 teams played in the B Division. Bizonai Kaunas won the B Division.

== Western Qualification ==
| | Club | GP | W | OTW | OTL | L | Goals | Pts |
|---|---|---|---|---|---|---|---|---|
| 1. | Sadvita Klaipeda | 9 | 9 | 0 | 0 | 0 | 69:18 | 27 |
| 2. | Ledo Linija Siauliai | 9 | 8 | 0 | 0 | 1 | 75:10 | 24 |
| 3. | Skatas-95 Klaipeda | 9 | 6 | 1 | 0 | 2 | 55:36 | 20 |
| 4. | Kirai Klaipeda | 9 | 4 | 1 | 0 | 4 | 42:34 | 13 |
| 5. | LRK Plunge | 9 | 4 | 0 | 0 | 5 | 41:44 | 12 |
| 6. | Olimpia Panevezys | 9 | 4 | 0 | 0 | 5 | 35:38 | 12 |
| 7. | Ledera Mazeikiai | 9 | 3 | 0 | 2 | 4 | 29:48 | 11 |
| 8. | Grifai Kretinga | 9 | 3 | 0 | 0 | 6 | 35:31 | 9 |
| 9. | Ledzinga Gargzdai | 9 | 2 | 0 | 0 | 7 | 18:55 | 6 |
| 10. | Toras Klaipeda | 9 | 0 | 0 | 0 | 9 | 2:87 | 0 |

The top five teams qualified for Division A.

== Division A ==
=== Regular season ===
==== Western Group ====
| | Club | GP | W | OTW | OTL | L | Goals | Pts |
|---|---|---|---|---|---|---|---|---|
| 1. | Sadvita Klaipeda | 4 | 4 | 0 | 0 | 0 | 34:4 | 12 |
| 2. | Ledo Linija Siauliai | 4 | 3 | 0 | 0 | 1 | 13:7 | 9 |
| 3. | Skatas-95 Klaipeda | 4 | 1 | 0 | 0 | 3 | 10:28 | 3 |
| 4. | Kirai Klaipeda | 4 | 1 | 0 | 0 | 3 | 14:17 | 3 |
| 5. | LRK Plunge | 4 | 1 | 0 | 0 | 3 | 13:28 | 3 |

==== Central-Eastern Group ====
| | Club | GP | W | OTW | OTL | L | Goals | Pts |
|---|---|---|---|---|---|---|---|---|
| 1. | Sporto Centras Elektrenai | 12 | 10 | 0 | 0 | 2 | 70:48 | 30 |
| 2. | LRK Kedainiai | 12 | 6 | 1 | 0 | 5 | 53:51 | 20 |
| 3. | Vanvita Vilnius | 12 | 6 | 0 | 0 | 6 | 55:55 | 18 |
| 4. | Charlie Pizza Kaunas | 12 | 3 | 0 | 2 | 7 | 43:53 | 11 |
| 5. | LRK Kaunas | 12 | 3 | 1 | 0 | 8 | 47:61 | 11 |

Source: Elite Prospects

=== Playoffs ===
==== Qualification ====
- LRK Kedainiai - Skatas-95 Klaipeda 13:2
- Ledo Linija Siauliai - Vanvita Vilnius 2:10

==== Semifinals ====
- Sadvita Klaipeda - LRK Kedainiai 1:10
- Sporto Centras Elektrenai - Vanvita Vilnius 13:2

==== Final ====
- Sporto Centras Elektrenai - LRK Kedainiai 5:3

==== 3rd place game ====
- Sadvita Klaipeda - Vanvita Vilnius 4:6

== Division B ==
=== Regular season ===
==== Western Group ====
| | Club | GP | W | OTW | OTL | L | Goals | Pts |
|---|---|---|---|---|---|---|---|---|
| 1. | Grifai Kretinga | 4 | 4 | 0 | 0 | 0 | 33:8 | 12 |
| 2. | Olimpas Panevezys | 4 | 3 | 0 | 0 | 1 | 23:9 | 9 |
| 3. | Ledera Mazeikiai | 4 | 2 | 0 | 0 | 2 | 23:17 | 6 |
| 4. | Ledzinga Gargzdai | 4 | 1 | 0 | 0 | 3 | 9:26 | 3 |
| 5. | Toras Klaipeda | 4 | 0 | 0 | 0 | 4 | 4:32 | 0 |

=== Central Group ===
| | Club | GP | W | OTW | OTL | L | Goals | Pts |
|---|---|---|---|---|---|---|---|---|
| 1. | Bizonai Kaunas | 12 | 10 | 0 | 1 | 1 | 144:33 | 31 |
| 2. | Rest Turas Kaunas | 12 | 9 | 2 | 0 | 1 | 107:31 | 31 |
| 3. | Velniai Kaunas | 12 | 8 | 0 | 0 | 4 | 70:51 | 24 |
| 4. | Suduva Marijampole | 12 | 7 | 0 | 1 | 4 | 85:38 | 22 |
| 5. | Week on Wing Jonava | 12 | 3 | 0 | 0 | 9 | 52:110 | 9 |
| 6. | Monstrai Kaunas | 12 | 2 | 1 | 0 | 9 | 53:111 | 8 |
| 7. | Crazy Puck Kaunas | 12 | 0 | 0 | 1 | 11 | 24:161 | 1 |

==== Eastern Group ====
| | Club | GP | W | OTW | OTL | L | Goals | Pts |
|---|---|---|---|---|---|---|---|---|
| 1. | Ober-Haus Vilnius | 12 | 9 | 1 | 0 | 2 | 85:32 | 29 |
| 2. | Ice Wind Vilnius | 12 | 8 | 1 | 1 | 2 | 65:39 | 27 |
| 3. | Meteoras Vilnius | 12 | 6 | 0 | 2 | 4 | 73:60 | 20 |
| 4. | Vilkai Vilnius | 12 | 3 | 1 | 0 | 8 | 35:71 | 11 |
| 5. | Hockey Punks Vilnius | 12 | 1 | 0 | 0 | 11 | 31:87 | 3 |

=== Playoffs ===
==== Qualification ====
- Ice Wind Vilnius - Grifai Kretinga 7:5
- Rest Turas Kaunas - Grifai Kretinga 2:4
- Rest Turas Kaunas - Ice Wind Vilnius 0:2

Ice Wind Vilnius qualified for the semifinals.

==== Semifinals ====
- Bizonai Kaunas - Ober-Haus Vilnius 5:4 OT
- Olimpas Panevezys - Ice Wind Vilnius 0:4

==== Final ====
- Bizonai Kaunas - Ice Wind Vilnius 3:2

=== 3rd place ===
- Olimpia Panevezys - Ober-Haus Vilnius 2:8
