= 1998–99 Lithuanian Hockey League season =

Lithuanian ice hockey league season

The 1998–99 Lithuanian Hockey League season was the eighth season of the Lithuanian Hockey League, the top level of ice hockey in Lithuania. Five teams participated in the league, and SC Energija won the championship. SC Energija received a bye until the finals, as they played in the Eastern European Hockey League.

== Regular season ==
| | Club | GP | W | T | L | GF–GA | Pts |
|---|---|---|---|---|---|---|---|
| 1. | Lithuanian Juniors | 18 | 18 | 0 | 0 | 151:34 | 54 |
| 2. | Nemunas Rokiskis | 18 | 12 | 0 | 6 | 119:55 | 36 |
| 3. | Poseidonas Elektrenai | 18 | 6 | 0 | 12 | 62:80 | 18 |
| 4. | Ledo Arena Kaunas | 18 | 0 | 0 | 18 | 46:209 | 0 |

Source: Elite Prospects

== Playoffs ==
=== 3rd place ===
- Nemunas Rokiskis - Poseidonas Elektrenai 9:2/6:3

=== Final ===
- SC Energija - Lithuanian Juniors 7:3/7:1
