= 2001–02 Lithuanian Hockey League season =

Lithuanian ice hockey league season

The 2001–02 Lithuanian Hockey League season was the 11th season of the Lithuanian Hockey League, the top level of ice hockey in Lithuania. Six teams participated in the league, and Garsu Pasaulis Vilnius won the championship. SC Energija received a bye until the finals, as they played in the Eastern European Hockey League.

== Regular season ==
	Club	GP	W	OTW	L	OTL	L	GF–GA	Pts
1.	Garsu Pasaulis Vilnius	16	14	1	0	0	1	175:38	44
2.	Ledo Arena Kaunas	16	10	0	1	0	5	122:57	31
3.	Galve Trakai	16	7	0	0	0	9	92:115	21
4.	Jauniai Elektrenai	16	4	0	1	1	10	65:114	14
5.	Ledo Arena Kaliningrad	16	3	0	0	0	13	44:174	9

== Playoffs ==
=== Quarterfinals ===
- Galve Trakai - Ledo Arena Kaunas 8:5/3:3 OT
- Garsu Pasaulis Vilnius - Jauniai Elektrenal 19:2/12:2

=== Semifinal ===
- Galve Trakai - Garsu Pasaulis Vilnius 0:5 Forfeit/0:5 Forfeit

=== Final ===
- Garsu Pasaulis Vilnius - SC Energija 7:6 SO
