= Viltis Elektrėnai =

Viltis Elektrenai was an ice hockey team in Elektrenai, Lithuania. They played in the Lithuania Hockey League, the top level of ice hockey in Lithuania, for three seasons.

In the 1996-97 season, they finished in fourth and last place in the regular season and failed to qualify for the playoffs. They won the championship in the 1999-2000 season by finishing first in the regular season with a record of 15 wins and 3 losses. Viltis finished first in the regular season in 2000-01 and qualified for the final against SC Energija, where they were defeated 5–0.
