= 1992–93 Lithuanian Hockey League season =

Lithuanian ice hockey league season

The 1992–93 Lithuanian Hockey League season was the second season of the Lithuanian Hockey League, the top level of ice hockey in Lithuania. Four teams participated in the league, and SC Energija won the championship.

== Standings ==
| | Club | GP | W | T | L | GF–GA | Pts |
|---|---|---|---|---|---|---|---|
| 1. | SC Energija | 12 | 11 | 1 | 0 | 134:25 | 23 |
| 2. | Vytis Kaunas | 12 | 7 | 2 | 3 | 96:52 | 16 |
| 3. | Poseidonas Elektrenai | 12 | 4 | 1 | 7 | 67:89 | 9 |
| 4. | Germantas Telsiai | 12 | 0 | 0 | 12 | 28:159 | 0 |

Source: Elite Prospects
