= 2009–10 Lithuanian Hockey League season =

Lithuanian ice hockey league season

The 2009–10 Lithuanian Hockey League season was the 19th season of the Lithuanian Hockey League, the top level of ice hockey in Lithuania. Four teams participated in the league, and Sporto Centras Elektrenai won the championship.

== Standings ==
	Club	GP	W	OTW	OTL	L	GF–GA	Pts
1.	Sporto Centras Elektrenai	11	9	0	0	2	103:50	27
2.	LRK Kedainiai	11	7	0	0	4	93:54	21
3.	Velniai Kaunas	12	4	1	0	7	54:85	14
4.	Suduva Mariampole	12	2	0	1	9	45:106	7

Source: Elite Prospects
