= 2011–12 Lithuanian Hockey League season =

Lithuanian ice hockey league season

The 2011–12 Lithuanian Hockey League season was the 21st season of the Lithuanian Hockey League, the top level of ice hockey in Lithuania. Six teams participated in the league, and ESSM Energija Elektrenai won the championship.

== Regular season ==
	Club	GP	W	OTW	OTL	L	Goals	Pts
1.	ESSM Energija Elektrenai	15	12	1	0	2	100:45	38
2.	Sporto Centras Elektrenai	15	8	0	0	7	84:82	24
3.	Centra Riga	15	7	1	1	6	60:60	24
4.	Delovaja Rus Kaliningrad	15	6	1	1	7	93:94	21
5.	LRK Kédainiai	15	5	2	1	7	66:67	20
6.	Vanvita Vilnius	15	2	0	2	11	50:100	8

Source: Elite Prospects
