= Kaunas Baltų Ainiai =

Ice hockey team in Kaunas, Lithuania

Kauno Baltų Ainiai
- City: Kaunas, Lithuania
- League: Lithuania Hockey League
- Founded: 2019
- Folded: 2021
- Home arena: Kaunas Ice Arena (capacity: 300)
- Colours: Black, red, white
- Head coach: Alexander Mikheyonok
- Website: Kaunas Baltų Ainiai

Franchise history
- 2019–2020: Baltų Ainiai/HC Klaipėda
- 2020–: Kauno Baltų Ainiai

Kauno Baltų Ainiai is a professional ice hockey team located in Kaunas, Lithuania, which plays in the Lithuania Hockey League, the top tier of ice hockey in Lithuania. They play home games at the Kaunas Ice Arena.

== History ==
Kauno Baltų Ainiai was founded in 2019 and immediately joined the Lithuania Hockey League. The team was initially known as Baltų Ainiai/HC Klaipėda, following the merger to two separate hockey schools. Their debut season was a torrid one, losing 17 of their 18 games, finishing last in the league. In the following offseason, the team changed its name to Kauno Baltų Ainiai, with the HC Klaipėda school instead teaming up with new comers Energija Hockey in order to create Energija Hockey/HC Klaipėda.

== Roster ==
Updated January 26, 2021.

Goaltenders
Number		Player	Catches	Acquired	Place of Birth
1	(Lithuania)	Lukas Jaksys	R	2019	Kaunas, Lithuania
29	(Lithuania)	Martin Petiul	L	2020	Vilnius, Lithuania
28	(Lithuania)	Kristupas Pranckietis	L	2019	-

Defencemen
Number		Player	Shoots	Acquired	Place of Birth
92	(Lithuania)	Viktoras Cernikovs	L	2020	-
63	(Lithuania) / (Russia)	Ruslan Černych	R	2020	Moscow, Russia
99	(Lithuania)	Lukas Eimontas	L	2019	-
31	(Latvia)	Konstantin Gribuļa	L	2020	Riga, Latvia
33	(Lithuania)	Kristupas Nemanis	L	2020	-
45	(Lithuania)	Martynas Petrauskas	R	2020	San Marino, United States

Forwards
Number		Player	Shoots	Position	Acquired	Place of Birth
67	(Russia)	Nikita Bashkirov	L	F	2020	Tyumen, Russia
19	(Lithuania)	Kipras Bazevicius	R	F	2019	-
24	(Lithuania)	Deivid Četvertak	L	C	2020	Vilnius, Lithuania
3	(Lithuania)	Matas Cyvas	L	F	2019	-
5	(Lithuania)	Tomas Ezerskis	R	F	2020	-
11	(Lithuania)	Tomas Fediakinas	L	F	2019	Kaunas, Lithuania
18	(Lithuania)	Paulius Grybauskas	R	F	2019	-
81	(Lithuania)	Erminas Gutauskas	L	F	2019	Kaunas, Lithuania
8	(Lithuania)	Marius Krikštanaitis	L	F	2019	Kaunas, Lithuania
88	(Lithuania)	Mykolas Kubilius	L	F	2020	-
13	(Russia)	Yevgeni Lukin	L	F	2020	-
51	(Lithuania)	Mantas Marcinkevičius	L	F	2019	Elektrėnai, Lithuania
17	(Lithuania)	Ignotas Ragas	L	F	2020	Vilnius, Lithuania
10	(Russia)	Damir Shafeyev	-	F	2020	-
16	(Latvia)	Nikita Svarjovs	L	F	2020	-
68	(Russia)	Makar Tokarev	L	LW	2020	Magnitogorsk, Russia
15	(Lithuania)	Jonas Viknius	R	F	2019	Kaunas, Lithuania
91	(Lithuania)	Dovydas Ziukas	L	F	2019	-

== Season-by-season record ==
Note: GP = Games played, W = Wins, L = Losses, T = Ties, OTL = Overtime losses, Pts = Points, GF = Goals for, GA = Goals against, PIM = Penalties in minutes

Season	GP	W	L	T	OTW	OTL	Pts	GF	GA	Finish	Playoffs
2019–20	18	0	16	—	1	1	3	39	140	4th	Playoffs cancelled
