= TV Aidas =

Television channel

- Country: Lithuania
- Broadcast area: Trakai; Elektrėnai
- Headquarters: Trakai, Lithuania

Programming
- Language: Lithuanian
- Picture format: 4:3 576i

Ownership
- Owner: VšĮ Regioninė televizija Aidas

History
- Founded: 1992
- Launched: 17 October 2013 (Digital)
- Founder: Česlovas Rulevičius
- Closed: 29 October 2012 (Analogue)

Links
- Website: http://tvaidas.lt

Availability

Terrestrial
- Digital: Channel 24

TV Aidas is a Lithuanian regional television channel broadcasting to Trakai and Papliauškos village, where broadcasting stations are located, covering a radius of 50 kilometers. TV Aidas broadcasts local programs from Tuesday to Friday from 6:00 p.m. to 9:00 p.m., and at other times it rebroadcasts the music television channel Žvaigždė TV.

== History ==
TV Aidas was founded in 1992. On 29 October 2012, TV Aidas ceased broadcasting after the switch-off of analog terrestrial television. After a break of almost a year, the channel began broadcasting via digital terrestrial television on 17 October 2013, citing difficulties.
