= 2000–01 Lithuanian Hockey League season =

The 2000–01 Lithuanian Hockey League season was the 10th season of the Lithuanian Hockey League, the top level of ice hockey in Lithuania. Five teams participated in the league, and SC Energija won the championship. SC Energija received a bye until the finals, as they played in the Eastern European Hockey League.

== Regular season ==
	Club	GP	W	T	L	GF–GA	Pts
1.	Viltis Elektrenai	6	6	0	0	70:11	18
2.	Jauniai Elektrenai	6	4	0	2	34:43	12
3.	Poseidonas Elektrenai	6	2	0	4	35:52	6
4.	Galve Trakai	6	0	0	6	22:50	0

Source: Elite Prospects

== Final ==
- SC Energija - Vyltis Elektrenai 5:0
