= 2004–05 Lithuanian Hockey League season =

Lithuanian ice hockey league season

The 2004–05 Lithuanian Hockey League season was the 14th season of the Lithuanian Hockey League, the top level of ice hockey in Lithuania. Four teams participated in the league, and SC Energija won the championship. SC Energija received a bye until the finals, as they played in the Latvian Hockey League. Sturm Kaliningrad from Russia participated in the league, but were ineligible for the playoffs.

== Regular season ==
	Club	GP	W	T	L	GF–GA	Pts
1.	Sturm Kaliningrad	8	4	0	4	47:34	12
2.	Jaunimas Elektrenai	8	4	0	4	56:46	12
3.	SC Energija II	8	4	0	4	45:68	12

Source: Elite Prospects

== Playoffs ==
=== Semifinal ===
- SC Energija II - Jaunimas Elektrenai 2:1 (4:3, 7:8, 8:6)

=== Final ===
- SC Energija - Jaunimas Elektrenai 2:0 (7:5, 10:9)
