= ESSM Energija Elektrėnai =

ESSM Energija Elektrenai
- City: Elektrenai, Lithuania
- Founded: 2000
- Home arena: Elektrenai Ice Palace
- Colours: Red, black, white

ESSM Energija Elektrenai is an ice hockey team in Elektrenai, Lithuania. The club currently consists only of a junior team. They are the farm team of SC Energija.

== History ==
ESSM Energija Elektrenai was founded in 2000. They were Lithuania Hockey League champions in 2012.

== Achievements ==
- Lithuanian champion (1): 2012.
