= HC Žalgiris =

- City: Vilnius, Lithuania
- League: Junior Hockey League Division B
- Conference: Western
- Division: Northwestern
- Founded: 2014
- Folded: 2015
- Home arena: Elektrėnai Ice Palace (capacity: 2,000)
- Colours
- General manager: Pavel Popov
- Head coach: Aigars Ciprus
- Asst. coach: Andrejs Ignatovičs
- Website: Official website

Franchise history
- HC Žalgiris Vilnius

HC Žalgiris was an ice hockey team in Vilnius, Lithuania. They played in the Junior Hockey League Division B, the second level of Russian junior ice hockey.

== History ==
The club's history began in 2011 when a club called HC Baltika was created. Immediately after its foundation, HC Baltika started playing in JHL B. During the 2011–2012 season, which was their first season, they finished the regular season ranked fifth. However, they weren't so fortunate in the playoffs and got eliminated in the quarterfinals. They were in their own shadows during the 2012–2013 season as they only managed to finish in twenty second place and therefore they missed that year's playoffs. 2013–2014 season was a revival for the club as they were fighting for the playoff spot, but lack of financial support meant that team could not play anymore and the club went bankrupt.

HC Žalgiris was created in 2014 and they took HC Baltika's place in JHL B. During its first season as HC Žalgiris, the team managed to finish fifth in the Western conference in the regular season and advanced to playoffs. However, they again lost in quarterfinals. In February 2016, the team was dissolved.
