= 2005–06 Lithuanian Hockey League season =

Lithuanian ice hockey league season

The 2005–06 Lithuanian Hockey League season was the 15th season of the Lithuanian Hockey League, the top level of ice hockey in Lithuania. Five teams participated in the league, and SC Energija won the championship. The league season was abbreviated, and SC Energija met Poseidonas Elektrenai in the final.

== Regular season ==
	Club	GP	W	T	L	GF–GA	Pts
1.	Sturm Kaliningrad	4	3	0	1	26:16	9
2.	SC Energija	1	1	0	0	21:0	3
3.	Jaunimas Elektrenai	4	1	0	3	16:26	3
4.	SC Energija II	0	0	0	0	0:0	0
5.	Poseidonas Elektrenai	1	0	0	1	0:21	0

Source: Elite Prospects

== Final ==
- SC Energija - Poseidonas Elektrenai 3:0 (6:1, 5:2, 7:4)
