= 2003–04 Lithuanian Hockey League season =

Lithuanian ice hockey league season

The 2003–04 Lithuanian Hockey League season was the 13th season of the Lithuanian Hockey League, the top level of ice hockey in Lithuania. Seven teams participated in the league, and SC Energija won the championship. SC Energija received a bye until the finals, as they played in the Latvian Hockey League.

== Regular season ==
	Club	GP	W	T	L	GF–GA	Pts
1.	Garsu Pausalis Vilnius	10	9	0	1	130:49	18
2.	Jaunimas Elektrenai	10	8	0	2	62:27	16
3.	Sturm Kaliningrad	9	5	0	4	63:71	10
4.	Ledo Arena Kaunas	8	3	0	5	40:46	6
5.	Garsu Pausalis Vilnius II	9	2	0	7	46:74	4
6.	Jaunimas Elektrenai II	10	0	0	10	35:109	0

Source: Elite Prospects

== Final ==
- SC Energija - Garsu Pausalis Vilnius 9:6
