= 2012–13 Lithuanian Hockey League season =

Lithuanian ice hockey league season

The 2012–13 Lithuanian Hockey League season was the 22nd season of the Lithuanian Hockey League, the top level of ice hockey in Lithuania. Four teams participated in the league, and SC Energija won the championship.

== Regular season ==
	Club	GP	W	OTW	OTL	L	Goals	Pts
1.	SC Energija	15	15	0	0	0	97:37	45
2.	Kėdainių LRK	15	4	1	1	9	51:63	15
3.	Delovaja Rus Kaliningrad	15	5	0	0	10	62:77	15
4.	Vanvita Vilnius	15	4	1	1	9	49:82	15

Source: Elite Prospects

== Playoffs ==
=== Semifinals ===
- SC Energija - Vanvita Vilnius 10:1
- Kėdainių LRK - Delovaja Rus Kaliningrad 2:5

=== 3rd place game ===
- Kėdainių LRK - Vanvita Vilnius 3:5

=== Final ===
- SC Energija - Delovaja Rus Kaliningrad 3:1
