= 1991–92 Lithuanian Hockey League season =

Lithuanian ice hockey league season

The 1991–92 Lithuanian Hockey League season was the first season of the Lithuanian Hockey League. SC Energija won the inaugural championship.
