= Mechelen Golden Sharks =

Ice hockey team in Mechelen, Belgium

- City: Mechelen, Belgium
- League: BeNe League 2018-present Belgian 2nd Division 2016-2018
- Founded: 2016
- Home arena: Ice Skating Center Mechelen (capacity: 1800)
- Colours: Grey, gold, black, white, red
- General manager: Laurens Luykx
- Head coach: Danny Gyesbreghs
- Affiliate: Future Golden Sharks
- Website: Mechelen Golden Sharks

Mechelen Golden Sharks are a Belgian professional ice hockey team that plays in the BeNe League, the top tier of the sport in Belgium and the Netherlands. The team is based in Mechelen and play their home games at the Ice Skating Center Mechelen.

== History ==
The Mechelen Golden Sharks began to play in 2016, initially in the Belgian 2nd division. There, they dominated the competition in their debut season, winning all but two of their games, ultimately finishing in the 1st place. The following season they returned, and were even more dominant, winning every game. Subsequently, they moved to the BeNe League. In their first season in the BeNe League the team signed Lithuanian international and former Nijmegen Devil Aivaras Bendžius, however, they struggled against the tougher competition, finishing 10th out of 12 teams. They would improve in their 2nd season in the league, finishing 8th and qualifying for the play-offs, which were ultimately cancelled due to the COVID-19 pandemic.

The Golden Sharks are the senior side representing the ColdPlay Sharks team. Meanwhile, a feeder team, the Future Golden Sharks plays in the Belgian 1st Division.

== Roster ==
Updated February 4, 2021.

Goaltenders
Number		Player	Catches	Acquired	Place of Birth
1	(Belgium)	Brent Vandenbergh	-	2019	-
55	(Canada) / (France)	Olivier Bertrand	L	2018	Hull, Canada
19	(Belgium)	Mike Jansen	L	2020	-
94	(Belgium)	Mike Gysbrechts	L	2017	Antwerp, Belgium

Defencemen
Number		Player	Shoots	Acquired	Place of Birth
6	(Belgium)	Vadim Gyesbreghs	L	2020	Wilrijk, Belgium
9	(Belgium)	Jakob Huyghe	R	2016	-
23	(Belgium)	Elan Verryt	-	2020	-
47	(Finland)	Kim Miettinen	L	2019	Tuusula, Finland
81	(Belgium)	Gijs De Schepper	R	2020	Nieuwenrode, Belgium
14	(Belgium)	Toon De Schepper	R	2020	Nieuwenrode, Belgium
81	(Belgium)	Rafael Salmi	L	2019	-
29	(Belgium)	Jens Theunis	L	2020	-
65	(Belgium)	Arne van Espen	L	2019	-
81	(Bosnia and Herzegovina)	Din Alen Filipović	R	2019	-

Forwards
Number		Player	Shoots	Position	Acquired	Place of Birth
4	(Netherlands)	Elia Urlings	-	F	2019	Breda, Netherlands
12	(Belgium)	Ben van den Bogaert	L	F	2019	-
13	(Belgium)	Peik Walden	-	F	2020	-
18	(Belgium)	Jano Vanderhulst	-	F	2017	-
20	(Slovakia)	Marek Ziarny	L	F	2017	-
24	(Belgium)	Kevin de Winter	L	F	2019	Antwerp, Belgium
28	(Belgium)	Kenneth Pittoors	L	F	2019	-
61	(Sweden) / (Belgium)	Adrian Koscher Ganslandt	R	F	2019	-
13	(Sweden) / (Belgium)	Gabriel Koscher Ganslandt	L	F	2019	-
91	(Belgium)	Stef Vermeulen	L	F	2019	-
10	(Finland)	Arvo Lahti	-	F	2019	-
15	(Belgium)	Axel Kila	L	F	2020	-
23	(England)	Jordan Kelsall	R	F	2020	Nottingham, England
25	(Belgium)	Mick Op de Beeck	L	LW	2018	-
31	(Belgium)	Stefaan Swennen	L	F	2016	Wilrijk, Belgium
89	(Belgium)	Timo Dewin	L	LW	2018	-

== Season-by-season record ==
Note: GP = Games played, W = Wins, L = Losses, T = Ties, OTL = Overtime losses, Pts = Points, GF = Goals for, GA = Goals against, PIM = Penalties in minutes

Season	League	GP	W	L	T	OTW	OTL	Pts	GF	GA	Finish	Playoffs
2016-17	Belgian 2nd Division	18	14	2	—	2	0	46	156	46	1st	-
2017-18	Belgian 2nd Division	18	18	0	—	0	0	54	253	45	1st	-
2018-19	BeNe League	22	4	18	—	0	0	12	63	165	10th	Did not qualify.
2019-20	BeNe League	20	9	11	—	0	0	29	99	95	8th	Playoffs cancelled

== Team records ==
=== Career ===
These are the top five scorers in Golden Sharks history.

Note: Pos = Position; GP = Games played; G = Goals; A = Assists; Pts = Points

Player	Pos	GP	G	A	Pts
Martin Váchal	F	27	113	85	198
Marek Ziarny	F	46	57	76	133
Olivier Roland	F	22	44	70	114
Jesse Raekelboom	F	13	37	66	103
Daniel Budde	D	60	26	41	67

Penalty minutes: Jakob Huyghe, 149

=== Season ===
==== Regular season ====
- Most goals in a season: Martin Váchal, 102 (2017–18)
- Most assists in a season: Martin Váchal, 77 (2017–18)
- Most points in a season: Martin Váchal, 179 (2017–18)
- Most penalty minutes in a season: Jakob Huyghe, 90 (2018–19)

== Notable players ==
- Aivaras Bendžius
