= Tadas Kumeliauskas =

Lithuanian ice hockey player (born 1990)

- Born: 11 December 1990 (age 35) Elektrėnai, Lithuania
- Height: 6 ft 3 in (191 cm)
- Weight: 180 lb (82 kg; 12 st 12 lb)
- Position: Forward
- Shoots: Right
- OHL team Former teams: Energija/GV Elektrėnai; SKA-VMF; Arystan Temirtau; HC TPS; Dresdner Eislöwen; Saryarka Karagandy; ECDC Memmingen; EV Landshut; Starbulls Rosenheim; Deggendorf Fire; Hockey Punks Vilnius
- National team: Lithuania
- NHL draft: Undrafted
- Playing career: 2005–present

Tadas Kumeliauskas (born 11 December 1990) is a Lithuanian professional ice hockey player for Energija/GV Elektrėnai of the Latvian OHL.

== Playing career ==
On 9 September 2013, Kumeliauskas signed a 1+1 deal with TPS of the Finnish Liiga debut playing with them during the 2013–14 Liiga season. On 14 January 2014, he extended his contract with the team.

On 8 July 2017, Kumeliauskas signed a tryout agreement with Dynamo Pardubice of Czech Extraliga. On 23 November 2017, he signed a four-game contract with Dresdner Eislöwen of the German DEL2. On 1 December 2017, his contract was extended. On 5 October 2018, Kumeliauskas signed with Saryarka Karagandy of the Supreme Hockey League (VHL). On 19 January 2019, Kumeliauskas signed with ECDC Memmingen of the German Oberliga.

== Personal life ==
He is the brother of fellow ice hockey player Donatas Kumeliauskas.
