= Garsų Pasaulis Vilnius =

Garsu Pasaulis Vilnius was an ice hockey team in Vilnius, Lithuania. They played in the Lithuania Hockey League, the top level of ice hockey in Lithuania, from 2001 to 2003.

In the 2001-02 season, they finished first in the regular season and won the championship by defeating SC Energija in the final, 7–6 in a shootout. During the 2002-03 season, the club finished second in the regular season and qualified for the final, again facing SC Energija. They lost both games of the doubleheader by scores of 10-2 and 11–2.
