= 2002–03 Lithuanian Hockey League season =

Lithuanian ice hockey league season

The 2002–03 Lithuanian Hockey League season was the 12th season of the Lithuanian Hockey League, the top level of ice hockey in Lithuania. 13 teams participated in the league, and SC Energija won the championship. SC Energija received a bye until the finals, as they played in the Eastern European Hockey League.

== Regular season ==
=== Group A ===
| | Club | GP | W | OTW | U | OTL | L | GF:GA | Pts |
|---|---|---|---|---|---|---|---|---|---|
| 1. | SC Energija | 12 | 12 | ? | 0 | ? | 0 | 166:30 | 36 |
| 2. | Garsu Pasaulis Vilnius | 12 | 5 | ? | 0 | ? | 7 | 83:102 | 15 |
| 3. | Jauniai Elektrenai | 12 | 1 | ? | 0 | ? | 11 | 40:157 | 3 |

Source: Elite Prospects

=== Group B ===
| | Club | GP | W | OTW | U | OTL | L | GF:GA | Pts |
|---|---|---|---|---|---|---|---|---|---|
| 1. | Garsu Pasaulis Vilnius II | 12 | 8 | 1 | 0 | 0 | 3 | 104:44 | 26 |
| 2. | Ledo Arena Kaunas | 12 | 7 | 1 | 0 | 1 | 3 | 65:58 | 24 |
| 3. | Ledowaja Arena Kaliningrad | 12 | 6 | 0 | 0 | 1 | 5 | 78:75 | 19 |
| 4. | SC Energija 88 | 12 | 1 | 0 | 0 | 0 | 11 | 44:114 | 3 |

=== Group C ===
| | Club | GP | W | OTW | U | OTL | L | GF:GA | Pts |
|---|---|---|---|---|---|---|---|---|---|
| 1. | Telmarkus Vilnius | 16 | 11 | 0 | 1 | 0 | 4 | 122:70 | 34 |
| 2. | SC Energija 90 | 16 | 10 | 0 | 1 | 0 | 5 | 94:84 | 31 |
| 3. | VP Market Vilnius | 16 | 6 | 0 | 3 | 0 | 7 | 72:62 | 21 |
| 4. | Lokiai Vilnius | 15 | 6 | 0 | 1 | 0 | 8 | 61:59 | 19 |
| 5. | Viesulas-86 Vilnius | 15 | 3 | 0 | 0 | 0 | 12 | 33:107 | 9 |

== Final ==
- SC Energija - Garsu Pasaulis Vilnius 10:2/11:2
