= Kapelle-op-den-Bos =

- Municipality
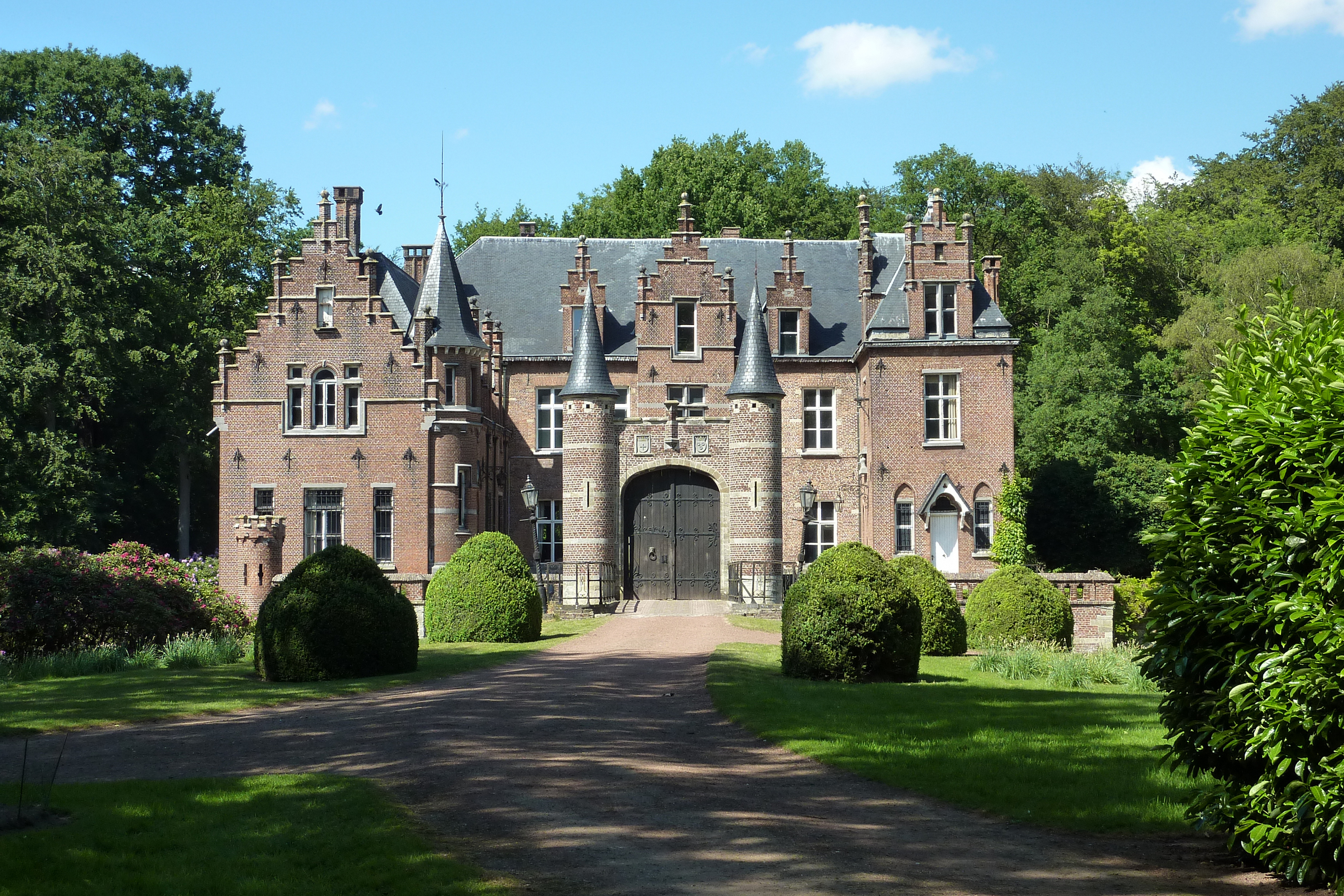

- Flag Coat of arms

- Location of Kapelle-op-den-Bos in Flemish Brabant
- Interactive map of Kapelle-op-den-Bos
- Location in Belgium
- Coordinates: 51°01′N 04°22′E
- Country: Belgium
- Community: Flemish Community
- Region: Flemish Region
- Province: Flemish Brabant
- Arrondissement: Halle-Vilvoorde

Government
  - Mayor: Mathias Diricx (CD&V)
  - Governing parties: CD&V, ProKA Vooruit

Area
  - Total: 15.37 km^{2} (5.93 sq mi)

Population (2018-01-01)
  - Total: 9,396
  - Density: 611.3/km^{2} (1,583/sq mi)
- Postal codes: 1880
- NIS code: 23039
- Area codes: 015, 02, 052, 03
- Website: www.kapelle-op-den-bos.be

Kapelle-op-den-Bos (Dutch pronunciation: [kaːˈpɛlə ʔɔb dɛm ˈbɔs]) is a municipality located in the Belgian province of Flemish Brabant. The municipality comprises the towns of Kapelle-op-den-Bos proper, Nieuwenrode and Ramsdonk. On January 1, 2006, Kapelle-op-den-Bos had a total population of 8,904. The total area is 15.25 km^{2} which gives a population density of 584 inhabitants per km^{2}.

Located at the intersection of the Willebroek to Brussels shipping canal and the Mechelen-Ghent railway line, the town is home to the Etex Group NV group of companies, which manufacture piping, roofing, gyprock and cement products. Numerous other industrial companies call Kapelle-op-den-Bos home, and the General Secondary College Sint-Theresia College (STK) has a wide catchment extending beyond municipal boundaries.

The town was a target for heavy bombing during the First World War due to its proximity to transport routes. Among the many buildings destroyed was the parish church dedicated to Saint Nicholas, which was later rebuilt with a modern flavour; the nave retained its original arched windows, but the steeple now appears as a crown.

Kapelle-op-den-Bos is heavily polluted with asbestos. Many inhabitants of the village died due to this mortal pollution. Health problems caused by the asbestos pollution still remain a major problem for the whole area.
