= 2006–07 Lithuanian Hockey League season =

Lithuanian ice hockey league season

The 2006–07 Lithuanian Hockey League season was the 16th season of the Lithuanian Hockey League, the top level of ice hockey in Lithuania. Nine teams participated in the league, and SC Energija won the championship. SC Energija received a bye until the finals, as they played in the Latvian Hockey League. Maximum Vilnius qualified for the final round (Group A) by virtue of winning Group B.

== Group B ==
	Club	GP	W	OTW	OTL	L	GF–GA	Pts
1.	Maximum Vilnius	10	9	0	0	1	98:45	27
2.	Vilkai Vilnius	10	8	0	0	2	79:45	24
3.	Sareme Vilnius	10	6	0	1	3	87:65	19
4.	LAE Kaunas	10	3	1	0	6	61:55	11
5.	Lokiai Vilnius	10	2	0	0	8	47:104	6
6.	SMD Ukmerge	10	1	0	0	9	31:89	3

Source: Elite Prospects

== Group A ==
	Club	GP	W	T	L	GF–GA	Pts
1.	SC Energija II	2	2	0	0	10:0	6
2.	Kauno Tigrai	2	1	0	1	8:7	3
3.	Vilniaus Maximum	2	0	0	2	4:15	0

Source: Elite Prospects

== Final ==
- SC Energija - SC Energija II 6:4
