= 2009–10 Latvian Hockey League season =

2009–10 Latvian Hockey League
- League: Latvian Hockey Higher League
- Sport: Ice hockey
- Teams: 8

Regular season
- Winners: HK Ozolnieki/Monarhs

Playoffs

Finals
- Champions: Dinamo-Juniors Riga
- Runners-up: HK Liepājas Metalurgs

Latvian Hockey League seasons
- ← 2008–09 2010–11 →

The 2009–10 Latvian Hockey League season was the 19th season of the Latvian Hockey League, the top level of ice hockey in Latvia. Eight teams participated in the league, and Dinamo-Juniors Riga won the championship. Dinamo-Juniors Riga and Liepājas Metalurgs received a bye until the playoffs, as they played in the Belarusian Extraleague.

== Regular season ==
	Club	GP	W	OTW	OTL	L	GF:GA	Pts
1.	(Latvia) HK Ozolnieki/Monarhs	30	24	2	2	2	143:66	78
2.	(Latvia) HK Liepājas Metalurgs II	30	18	1	2	9	124:75	58
3.	(Latvia) DHK Latgale	30	15	3	1	11	126:85	52
4.	(Lithuania) SC Energija	30	14	3	1	12	104:121	49
5.	(Latvia) SK Riga 18	30	7	1	2	20	53:81	25
6.	(Latvia) HK Ogre	30	2	0	2	26	61:182	8

== Playoffs ==
Quarterfinals (Best of Five)

- (Latvia) DHK Latgale - (Latvia) HK Liepājas Metalurgs II 1:3
- (Lithuania) SC Energija - (Latvia) HK Ozolnieki/Monarhs 1:3

Semifinals (Best of Five)

- (Latvia) HK Liepājas Metalurgs - (Latvia) HK Liepājas Metalurgs II 3:0
- (Latvia) Dinamo-Juniors Riga - (Latvia) HK Ozolnieki/Monarhs 3:1

Final (Best of Seven)

- (Latvia) Liepājas Metalurgs - (Latvia) Dinamo-Juniors 3:4 (1:1,2:2,0:1)
- (Latvia) Liepājas Metalurgs – (Latvia) Dinamo-Juniors 0:3 (0:1,0:0,0:2)
- (Latvia) Dinamo-Juniors - (Latvia) Liepājas Metalurgs 4:1 (0:1,3:0,1:0)
- (Latvia) Dinamo-Juniors - (Latvia) Liepājas Metalurgs 2:3 SO (0:0, 1:2, 1:0, 0:0, 0:1)
- (Latvia) Liepājas Metalurgs - (Latvia) Dinamo-Juniors 2:3 OT (1:0,1:0,0:2,0:1)
