= Akropolis (Klaipėda) =

Coordinates: 55.692936°N 21.154285°E

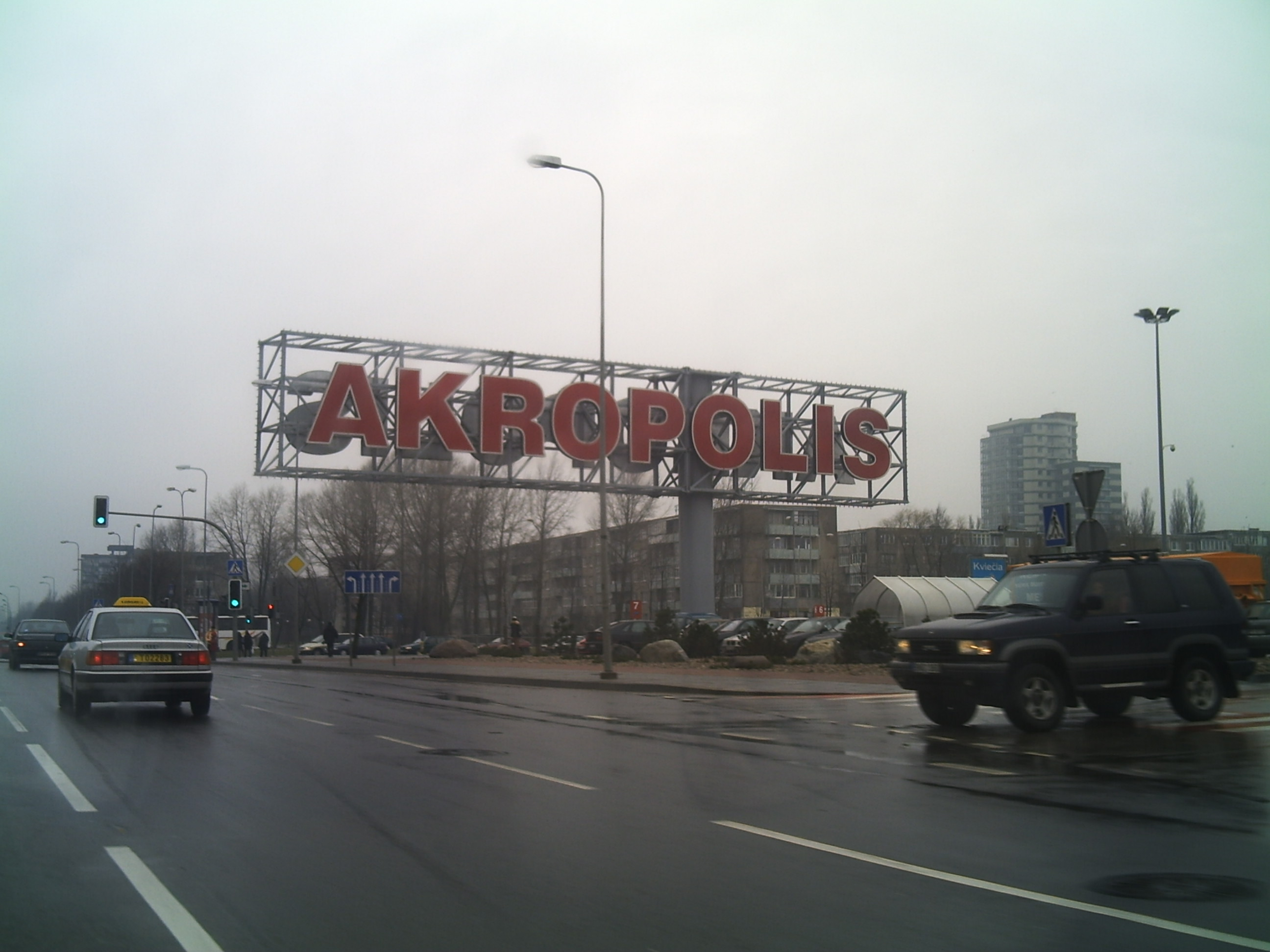
Akropolis

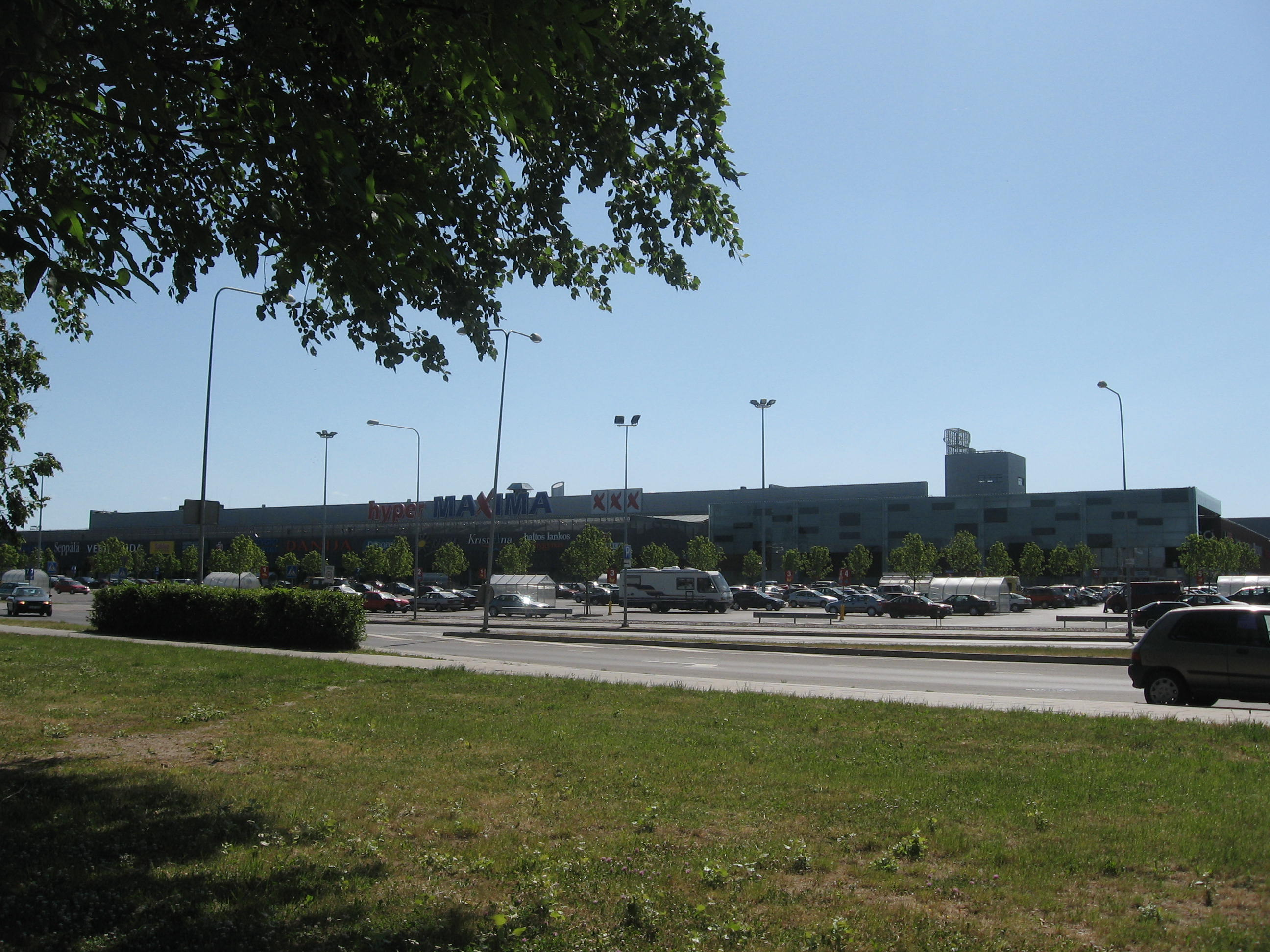

Akropolis is the biggest shopping center in Klaipėda and the sixth largest shopping mall in Lithuania with 76,410 m2 (820,000 sq ft). It was built by the Lithuanian company AB "Vilniaus Akropolis" (headed by Mindaugas Marcinkevičius) in 2005. It was built Taikos pr. 61. On the side of the building there is a four-level free car park. The entertainment area featuring an Olympic-sized ice arena, several restaurants, 6 cinema halls, bowling, casinos and other entertainment venues. There are grocery stores, Maxima LT supermarket, 244 shops etc. The mall also has bookstores. Owner is AKROPOLIS GROUP, UAB.

== See also ==
- List of shopping malls in Lithuania
