= Nieuwenrode =

Coordinates: 50°59′N 4°21′E

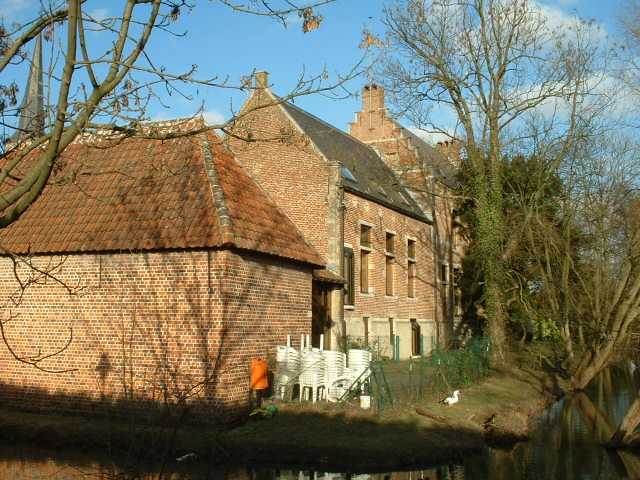
De Oude Pastorie (The Old Rectory)

Nieuwenrode is a village (deelgemeente) within the Belgian municipality of Kapelle-op-den-Bos, Flemish Brabant. A part of the actual village is located on the territory of the neighbouring municipality of Meise.

A hamlet of Nieuwenrode is Ipsvoorde, near the forest of Gravenbos.
