= Germantas Telšiai =

- City: Telšiai, Lithuania
- League: Lithuania Hockey League

Germantas Telšiai was an ice hockey team in Telšiai, Lithuania. They played in the Lithuania Hockey League from 1992 to 1998.

== History ==
The club struggled at first, finishing in last place during their first two seasons in the Lithuania Hockey League. They finished in second place to SC Energija in 1994–95. In 1995–96, they finished first in the regular season, but lost to SC Energija in the playoff finals. Telšiai finished in second place in 1996–97, but lost the third place game to Nemunas Rokiskis. Their last appearance in the Lithuania Hockey League came during the 1997–98 season, where they finished in last place in the league after only winning one game.

== Season-by-season results ==
Season	GP	W	L	T	GF	GA	Pts	Results
1992–93	12	0	12	0	29	160	0	4th in regular season
1993–94	15	2	12	1	50	122	5	5th in regular season
1994-95	29	13	6	1	107	81	27	2nd in regular season
1995–96	11	7	4	0	57	48	28	1st in regular season, lost in final
1996–97	18	9	7	2	70	53	20	2nd in regular season, lost in 3rd place game
1997–98	16	1	15	0	43	106	40	5th in regular season
