= Sporto Centras Elektrėnai =

Lithuanian ice hockey team

Energija - Sporto Centras Elektrenai
- City: Elektrenai, Lithuania
- League: Lithuania Hockey League
- Founded: 2008
- Home arena: Elektrenai Ice Palace
- Colours: Yellow, white

Energija - Sporto Centras Elektrenai is an ice hockey team in Elektrenai, Lithuania. They play in the Lithuania Hockey League, the top level of ice hockey in Lithuania. The club was founded in 2008, and plays their home games at the Elektrenai Ice Palace. They won the league championship in 2010, repeating the achievement a year later.

== Achievements ==
- Lithuanian champion (2): 2010, 2011.
