= Elektrėnai Ice Palace =

Ice hockey arena in Elektrėnai, Lithuania

Coordinates: 54°47′04″N 24°40′10″E

Backside of the arena

Elektrėnai Ice Palace (Lithuanian: Elektrėnų ledo rūmai) is an indoor ice hockey arena in Elektrėnai, Lithuania. It seats 2,000 people. It is the home arena of SC Energija.
