= Nemunas Rokiškis =

Nemunas Rokiskis
- City: Rokiskis, Lithuania
- League: Lithuania Hockey League

Nemunas Rokiskis was an ice hockey team in Rokiskis, Lithuania. They played in the Lithuania Hockey League from 1993 to 2000.

== History ==
The club finished in 4th place in the Lithuania Hockey League in 1994 and sixth place in 1995. From 1996-1998, Rokiskis finished third in the regular season and competed in the third place game in all three years. They won the third place game in 1997. In 1999, they finished second in the regular season and defeated Poseidonas Elektrenai in the third place game. Their last appearance in the Lithuania Hockey League came during the 1999–00 season, where they finished in third place.

== Season-by-season results ==
Season	GP	W	L	T	GF	GA	Pts	Results
1993-94	16	3	11	2	58	126	8	4th in regular season
1994-95	19	2	17	0	70	183	4	6th in regular season
1995-96	12	4	5	3	57	58	11	3rd in regular season, lost in 3rd place game
1996-97	18	7	11	0	72	79	14	3rd in regular season, won 3rd place game
1997-98	16	10	6	0	85	75	20	3rd in regular season, lost 3rd place game
1998-99	18	12	6	0	119	55	36	2nd in regular season, won 3rd place game
1999-00	18	7	11	0	107	126	21	3rd in regular season
