= Energija/GV Elektrėnai =

Ice hockey team in Elektrėnai, Lithuania

- City: Elektrėnai, Lithuania
- League: OHL
- Founded: 1977
- Home arena: Elektrėnai Ice Palace (capacity: 2,000)
- Colours: Red, white, light blue, black
- Head coach: Arūnas Aleinikovas
- Website: airwellenergija.lt

Franchise history
- 1977–2019: Energija Elektrenai
- 2020–: Energija/GV Elektrenai

Championships
- Playoff championships: 1986, 1990, 1991, 1992, 1993, 1994, 1995, 1996, 1997, 1998, 1999, 2001, 2003, 2004, 2005, 2006, 2007, 2008, 2009, 2012, 2013, 2016, 2017, 2018, 2019, 2024, 2026

Energija/GV Elektrėnai (formerly Energija Elektrėnai) is a professional ice hockey team based in Elektrėnai, Lithuania. The team competes in the Latvian Hockey Higher League, the top tier of ice hockey in Latvia. The team plays its home games at Elektrėnai Ice Palace. Energija is the most successful ice hockey team in Lithuania, having won 27 Lithuanian championships.

== History ==
Energija Elektrėnai was founded in 1977, following the completion of the Elektrėnai Ice Palace the year prior. The team immediately joined Lithuanian league and fared well in their first season, finishing fifth out of nine teams whilst qualifying for the second round of competition. Energija won its first Lithuanian championship in 1986 after battling with Baltija Klaipėda for the top spot over the course of the season. The following season, Energija made it to the play-off final, ultimately losing to Baltija. The team won their next championship in 1990, and that marked the beginning of the team's dominance of the domestic competition, as they went on to win every Lithuanina championship until the 1999 season.

Starting in 1995, Energija participated in the Eastern European Hockey League, a trans-national league featuring teams from Belarus, Latvia, Lithuania and Ukraine. In addition to the EEHL, Energija were given an automatic spot in the final in the Lithuanian league, despite no longer competing in the Lithuanian regular season. Energija's maiden season in the EEHL saw them finish sixth out of eight teams. During the team's tenure in the EEHL, they were often near the bottom of the table. Energija did not compete in the 1999–2000 EEHL season, however, they returned to the league in 2001, and remained there until 2003, a year before the league folded.

Subsequently, Energija joined the Latvian Hockey Higher League, they had a strong debut season, making it to the semi-finals, losing to ASK/Ogre. They then lost again in the third place game to HK Liepājas Metalurgs. Despite the auspicious start north of the border, the team's first season in the Latvian border was their best; they never managed to advance past the quarter-finals. Energija participated in the Latvian league until 2012, when they returned to the Lithuanian league. During their time in Latvia, Energija were again given an automatic spot in the Lithuanian final, and they continued to dominate the league, winning every edition of the competition between 2003 and 2009. In September 2010, a new league had been formed in Lithuania, the Lithuania Hockey League (Lithuanian: Nacionaline ledo ritulio lyga), of which Energija were founding members. After leaving the Latvian league, Energija played one season in the NLRL, again being crowned champions, before deciding to move solely to the Belarusian second tier, the Vysshaya Liga.

The side's maiden season in Belarus was a decent one, finishing fifth out of 13 teams in the regular season, before losing in the play-off quarter-finals. Their best season in Belarus came during the 2015–16 season, where they reached the play-off semi-finals. The 2015–16 season saw Energija return to the NLRL; they continued to field a team in both in the Vysshaya Liga and the NLRL until 2018, when they elected to focus solely on the NLRL. During this season, former NHL star and Olympic gold medallist Darius Kasparaitis briefly played for Energija in order to qualify for the Lithuanian national team, having previously represented Russia. He had played for Hockey Punks Vilnius in previous seasons, whilst obtaining national team eligibility. The move saw Kasparaitis play one game for Energija, the same team with whom he played as a junior. Fellow ex-NHLer Dainius Zubrus also began his career with Energija. However, Enerjiga only played one season in the NLRL before suffering from financial difficulties which resulted in a dispute with the owners of the Elektrėnai Ice Palace, as a result the team did not compete in the NLRL during the 2019–20 season. The team later went on to partner with the Geležinis Vilkas hockey school, named after the mythical Iron Wolf, and returned to the NLRL for the 2020–21 season under the name Energija/GV.

Owing to the team's dominance of the Lithuanian league, they regularly appeared in continental competition in the 1990s and 2000s. Initially appearing in the European Cup and then its successor competition the Continental Cup. However, they did not have much success in Europe, only managing to make it out of the initial group stage twice.

== Roster ==
Updated 5 May 2026.

Goaltenders
| Number | | Player | Catches | Acquired | Place of Birth |
|---|---|---|---|---|---|
| 30 | (Lithuania) | Arkadijus Grigaravicius-Reyzin | L | 2024 | Saint Petersburg, Russia |
| 35 | (Lithuania) | Laurynas Lubys | L | 2025 | Klaipėda, Lithuania |
| 1 | (Lithuania) | Rokas Salecis | L | 2024 | - |

Defencemen
| Number | | Player | Shoots | Acquired | Place of Birth |
|---|---|---|---|---|---|
| 88 | (Canada) | Jared Brock | L | 2025 | Edmonton, Alberta, Canada |
| 33 | (Lithuania) | Matas Cyvas | L | 2024 | – |
| 96 | (Lithuania) | Aurimas Gaidauskas | L | 2024 | Elektrėnai, Lithuania |
| 6 | (Lithuania) | Artūras Katulis | R | 2025 | Elektrėnai, Soviet Union |
| 5 | (Ukraine) | Sergii Lohach | L | 2025 | Kyiv, Ukraine |
| 2 | (Lithuania) | Paulius Rumsevicius | R | 2022 | Elektrėnai, Lithuania |
| 16 | (Lithuania) | Avgustinas Silinas | L | 2025 | Vilnius, Lithuania |
| 24 | (Lithuania) | Dominykas Skadauskas | R | 2014 | Elektrėnai, Lithuania |
| 3 | (Lithuania) | Otas Urvelis | L | 2023 | - |

Forwards
| Number | | Player | Shoots | Position | Acquired | Place of Birth |
|---|---|---|---|---|---|---|
| 93 | (Lithuania) | Aivaras Bendžius | L | LW | 2024 | Elektrėnai, Lithuania |
| 87 | (Lithuania) | Egidijus Binkulis | R | C | 2025 | Elektrėnai, Lithuania |
| 85 | (Lithuania) | Kevinas Cerniauskas | L | F | 2025 | - |
| 17 | (United States) | Matt Gould | L | F | 2024 | Weymouth, Massachusetts, United States |
| 12 | (Lithuania) | Kipras Grabliauskas | L | F | 2021 | Kaunas, Lithuania |
| 18 | (Lithuania) | Paulius Grybauskas | L | F | 2024 | Kaunas, Lithuania |
| 7 | (Lithuania) | Karolis Krasilnikovas | L | F | 2020 | Elektrėnai, Lithuania |
| 71 | (Lithuania) | Tadas Kumeliauskas | R | C/RW | 2023 | Elektrėnai, Soviet Union |
| 35 | (Lithuania) | Adomas Laimutis | L | F | 2025 | - |
| 13 | (Lithuania) | Dovydas Laimutis | R | F | 2021 | Elektrėnai, Lithuania |
| 25 | (Lithuania) | Laurynas Miliunas | L | F | 2025 | - |
| 73 | (Ukraine) | Nazar Ruzhnikov | L | F | 2025 | Kyiv, Ukraine |
| 86 | (Lithuania) | Augustas Salecis | L | F | 2025 | - |

== Season-by-season record ==
Note: GP = Games played, W = Wins, L = Losses, T = Ties, OTL = Overtime losses, Pts = Points, GF = Goals for, GA = Goals against, PIM = Penalties in minutes

| Season | League | GP | W | L | T | OTW | OTL | Pts | GF | GA | Finish | Playoffs |
| 2015–16 | NLRL | 24 | 24 | 0 | — | 0 | 0 | 72 | 280 | 64 | 1st | Champion (Hockey Punks) |
| 2015–16 | BHL | 36 | 15 | 15 | — | 5 | 1 | 56 | 132 | 148 | 5th | Semi-final loss (HC Shakhtyor Soligorsk-2) |
| 2016–17 | NLRL | 20 | 20 | 0 | — | 0 | 0 | 60 | 182 | 50 | 1st | Semi-final loss (Juodupė) |
| 2016–17 | BHL | 44 | 18 | 19 | — | 4 | 3 | 65 | 176 | 191 | 8th | Quarter-final loss (HC Shakhtyor Soligorsk-2) |
| 2017–18 | NLRL | 20 | 19 | 1 | — | 0 | 0 | 57 | 155 | 55 | 1st | Champion(Kaunas Hockey) |
| 2017–18 | BHL | 52 | 9 | 40 | — | 1 | 2 | 31 | 139 | 335 | 12th | Did not qualify |
| 2018–19 | NLRL | 18 | 15 | 2 | — | 0 | 1 | 46 | 90 | 36 | 1st | Champion(Hockey Punks) |
| 2019–20 | Did not compete |
| 2020–21 | NLRL | 20 | 11 | 5 | — | 1 | 3 | 38 | 103 | 74 | 3rd | Semifinal loss (Kaunas Hockey) |
| 2021–22 | NLRL | 20 | 13 | 6 | — | 1 | 0 | 41 | 117 | 60 | 2nd | Final loss (Hockey Punks) |
| 2022–23 | OHL | 32 | 8 | 18 | — | 4 | 2 | 26 | 101 | 134 | 7th | Quarterfinal loss (Zemgale) |
| 2023–24 | OHL | 32 | 5 | 26 | — | 1 | 0 | 12 | 69 | 190 | 8th | Did not qualify (HK Mogo) |
| 2024–25 | OHL | 36 | 10 | 22 | — | 3 | 1 | 27 | 105 | 148 | 5th | Did not qualify (HK Mogo) |
| 2025–26 | OHL | 40 | 6 | 28 | — | 2 | 4 | 20 | 176 | 104 | 8th | Did not qualify (HK Mogo) |

== Honours ==
Lithuanian championships:

- 1986, 1990, 1991, 1992, 1993, 1994, 1995, 1996, 1997, 1998, 1999, 2001, 2003, 2004, 2005, 2006, 2007, 2008, 2009, 2012, 2013, 2016, 2017, 2018, 2019, 2024, 2026

== Team records ==
=== Career ===
These are the top five scorers in Energija history.

Note: Pos = Position; GP = Games played; G = Goals; A = Assists; Pts = Points

| Player | Pos | GP | G | A | Pts |
| Dovydas Kulevičius | F | 405 | 189 | 452 | 644 |
| Rolandas Aliukonis | D | 523 | 121 | 364 | 485 |
| Sarunas Kuliesius | F | 353 | 196 | 247 | 443 |
| Aivaras Bendžius | F | 348 | 228 | 180 | 408 |
| Povilas Verenis | F | 184 | 184 | 174 | 358 |

Penalty minutes: Rolandas Aliukonis, 885

=== Season ===
==== Regular season ====
- Most goals in a season: Paulius Gintautas, 42 (2013–14)
- Most assists in a season: Dovydas Kulevičius, 274 (2015–16)
- Most points in a season: Dovydas Kulevičius, 108 (2015–16)
- Most penalty minutes in a season: Andrius Kaminskas, 146 (2002–03)

==== Playoffs ====
- Most goals in a playoff season: Povilas Verenis, 10 (2017–18)
- Most assists in a playoff season: Tadas Kumeliauskas, 9 (2023–24)
- Most points in a playoff season: Povilas Verenis, 16 (2017–18)
- Most penalty minutes in a playoff season: Aivaras Bendžius, 75 (2016–17)

== Notable players ==
- Nerijus Ališauskas
- Egidijus Bauba
- Darius Kasparaitis
- Dainius Zubrus
