= Elektrėnai =

- City
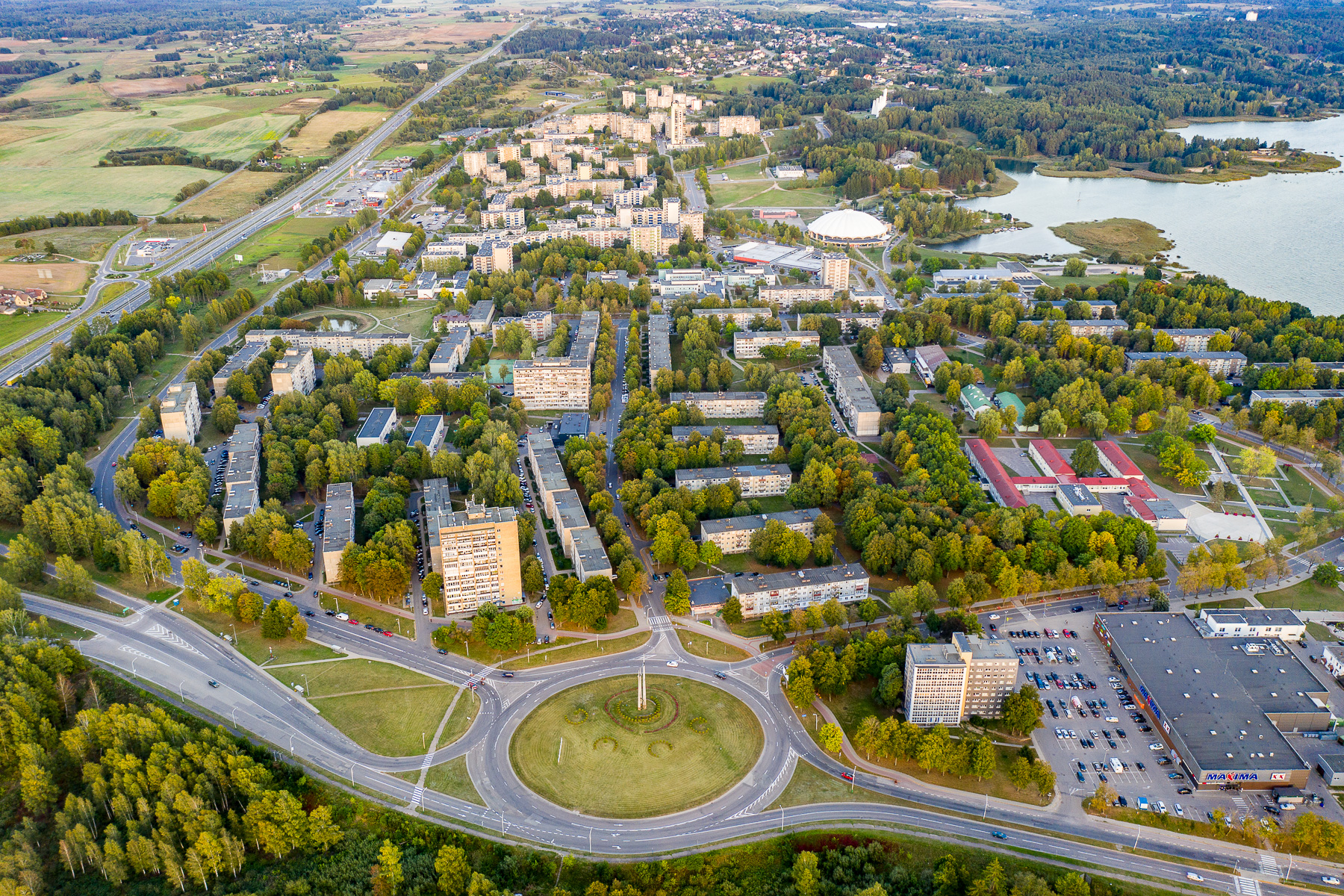
- Elektrėnai panorama

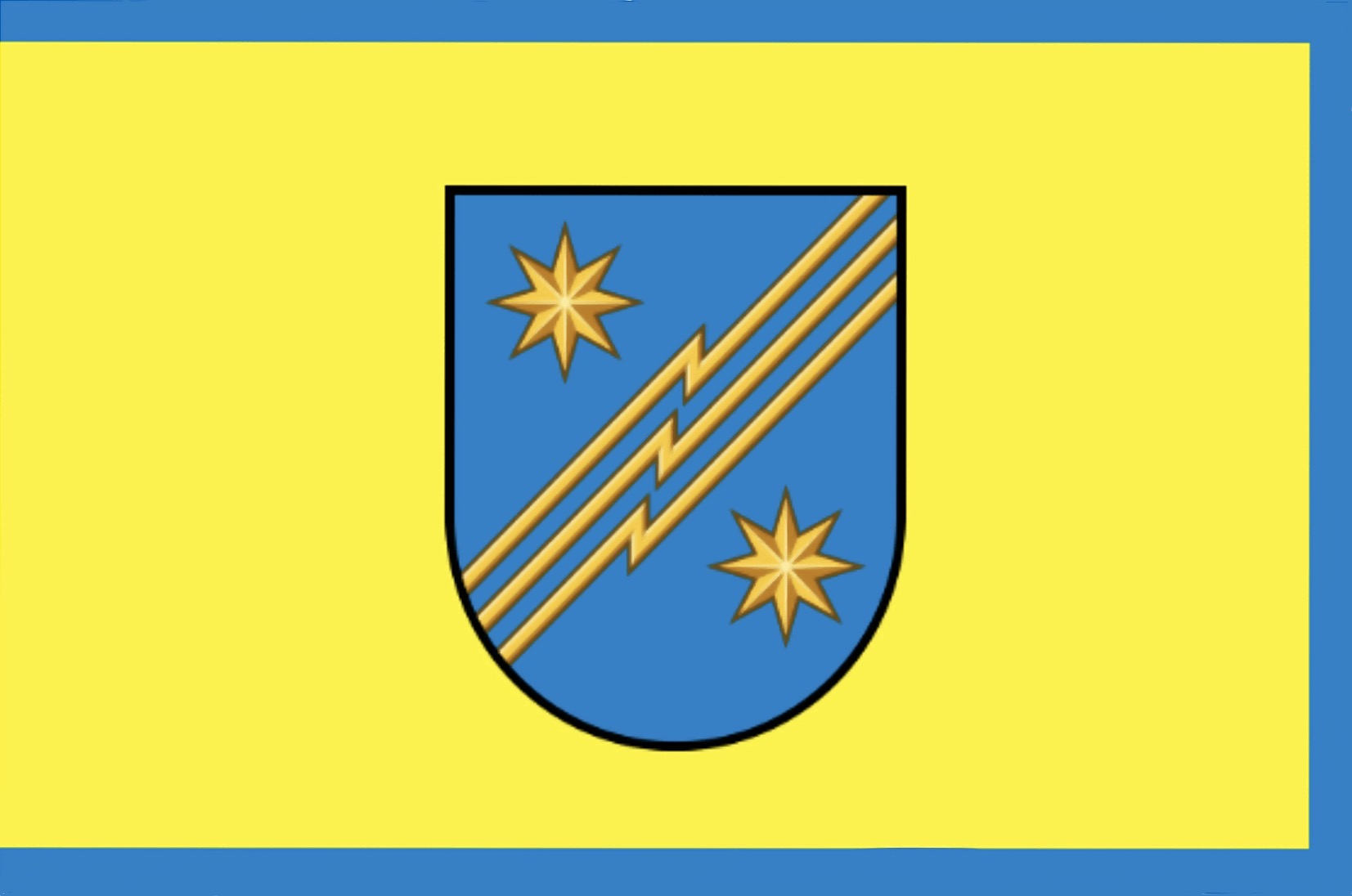
- Flag Coat of arms

- Location of Elektrėnai
- Coordinates: 54°47′16″N 24°40′16″E
- Country: Lithuania
- Ethnographic region: Dzūkija
- County: Vilnius County
- Municipality: Elektrėnai Municipality
- Eldership: Elektrėnai Eldership
- Capital of: Elektrėnai Municipality; Elektrėnai Eldership
- Established: 1961
- Granted city rights: 1962

Population (2022)
  - Total: 11,009
  - Density: 524/km^{2} (1,360/sq mi)
- Time zone: UTC+2 (EET)
  - Summer (DST): UTC+3 (EEST)
- Website: elektrenai.lt

Elektrėnai is a city of about 11,000 inhabitants in Vilnius County, Lithuania; since 2000 it has been the capital of the Elektrėnai Municipality. It is situated between the two largest cities in Lithuania – Vilnius and Kaunas.

== History ==
Historically, two villages were located in the area; one of those was Perkūnkiemis (Lithuanian: Thunder's yard). Elektrėnai is one of the newest towns of Lithuania, having been established during the Soviet occupation in the early 1960s as the living space for workers of the nearby power plant. It was expanded in the 1980s and early 1990s as a residence for builders and workers at the nearby Kruonis Pumped Storage Plant. The name of the new town was derived from word elektra (English: electricity) – a borrowing to Lithuanian language from Greek. Gintarėnai (gintaras – Lithuanian word for amber) was another name considered, but was rejected before the start of the construction. Most of the buildings in Elektrėnai are large block housing projects built during the Soviet period, with no historical buildings. The town, however, is close to Elektrėnai Reservoir, an artificial lake that was created to cool the Elektrėnai Power Plant. The water is several degrees warmer than water at the other nearby lakes.

== Ice hockey ==
Elektrėnai is well known for its ice hockey tradition. For a rather long period of time Elektrėnai was the only city in Lithuania with a well-equipped skating rink. Two National Hockey League players: Darius Kasparaitis and Dainius Zubrus were born in Elektrėnai. Its local ice hockey team is Energija. Inhabitants of Elektrėnai make up a considerable part of the national ice hockey team.

== Gallery ==
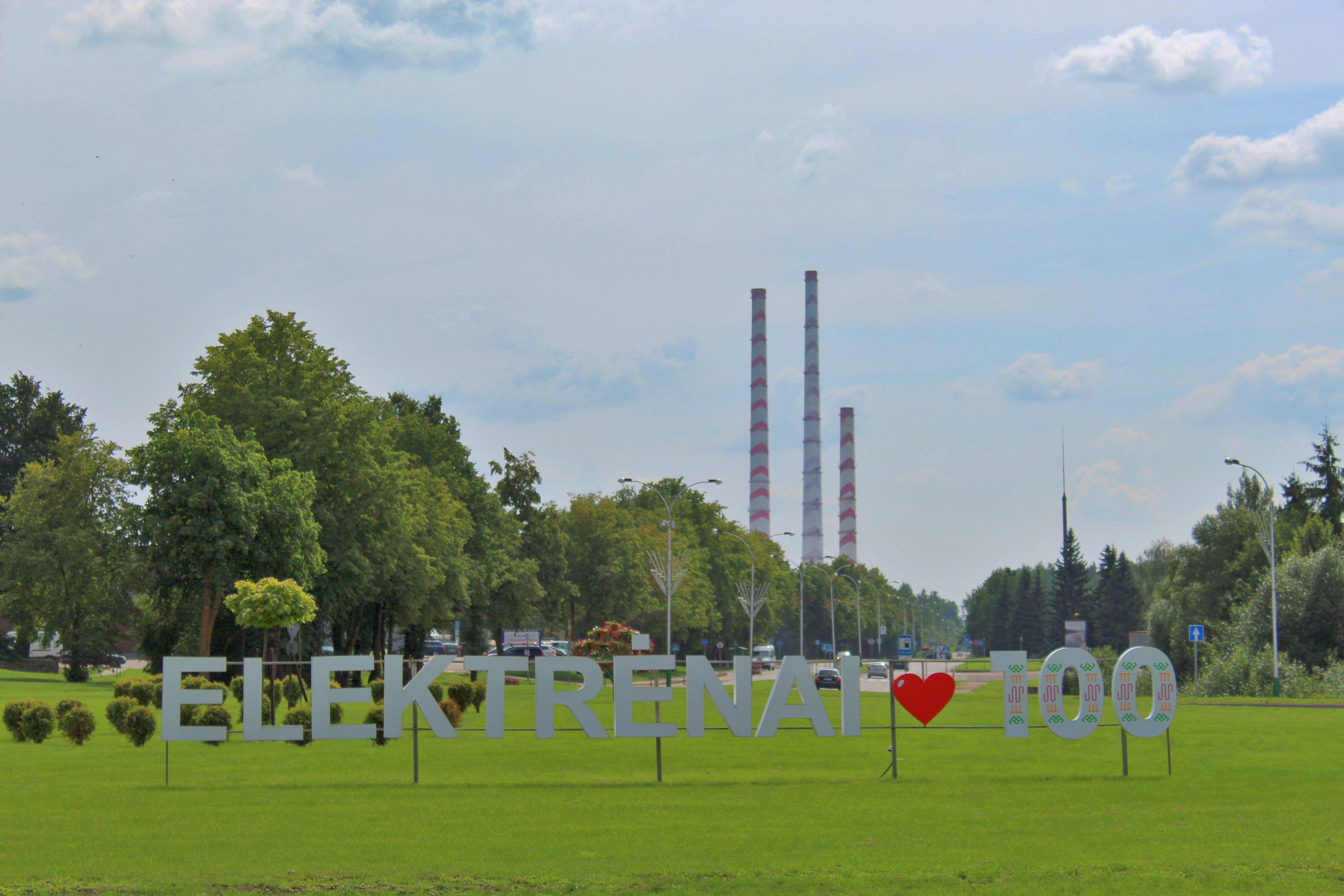
Entrance to Elektrėnai from the motorway

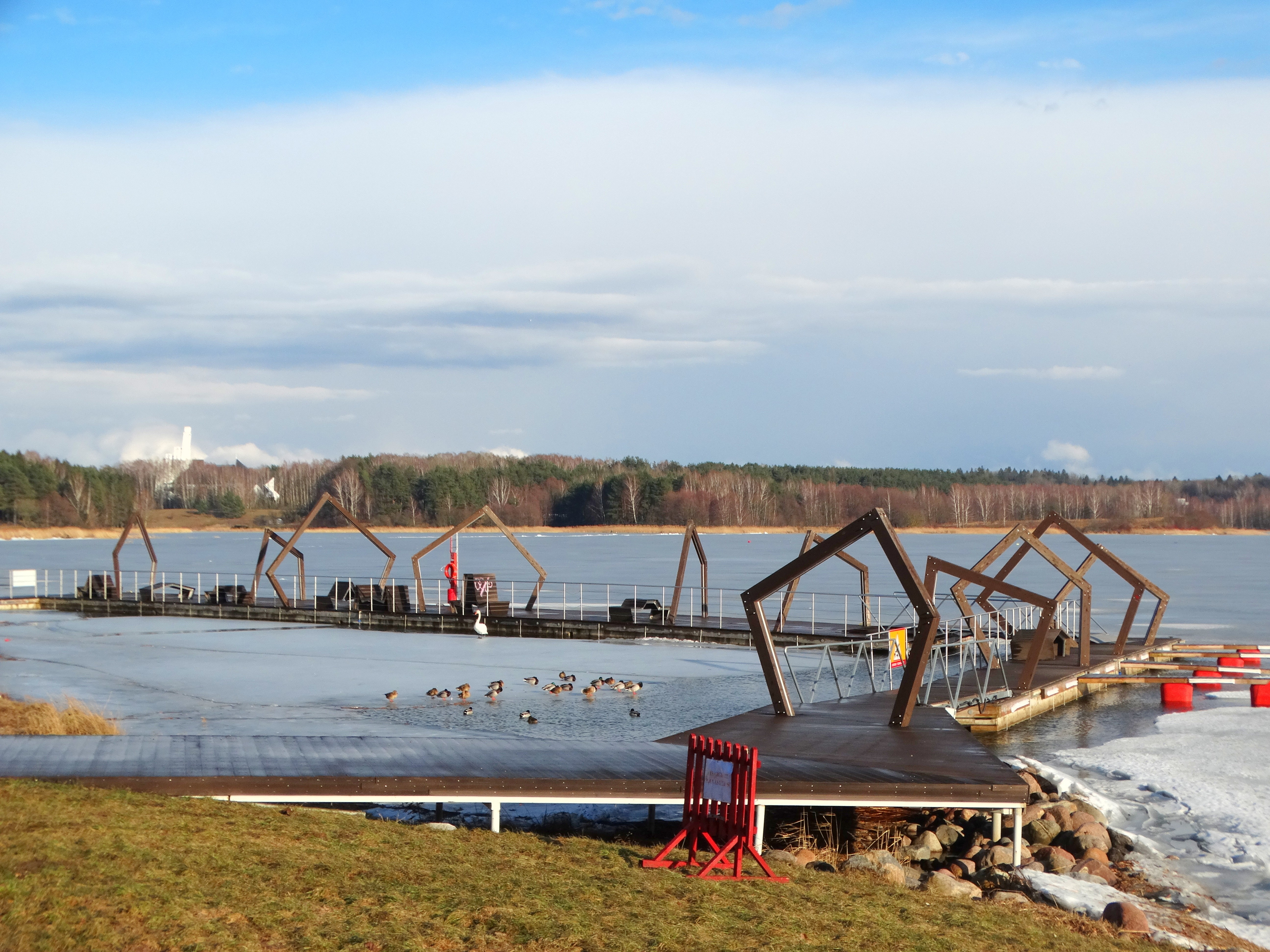
Elektrėnai Pier Bridge

Elektrėnai Ice Palace

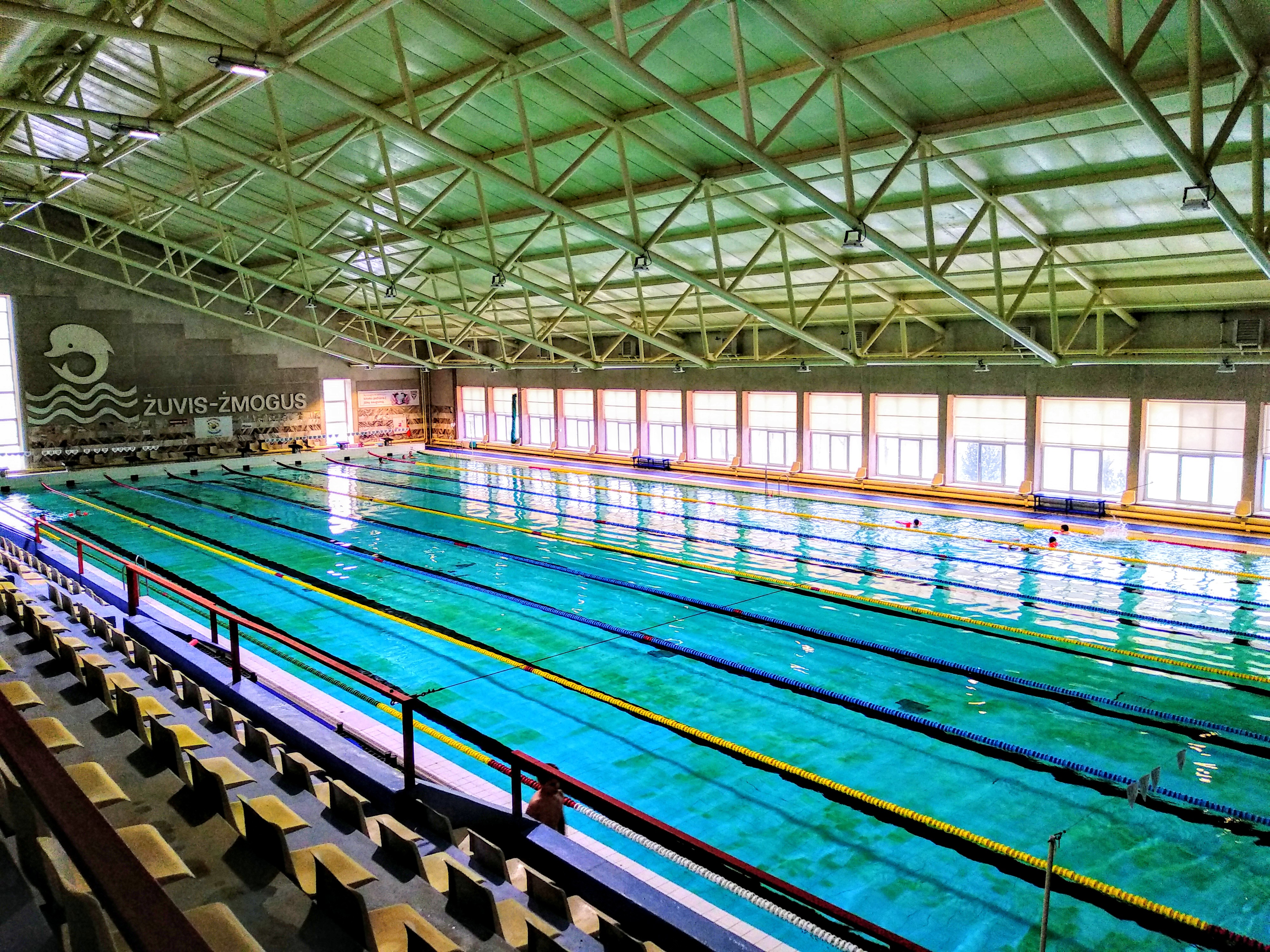
Swimming pool

Church of St. Virgin Mary, Queen of Martyrs, in Elektrėnai

Elektrėnai Power Plant in 2023

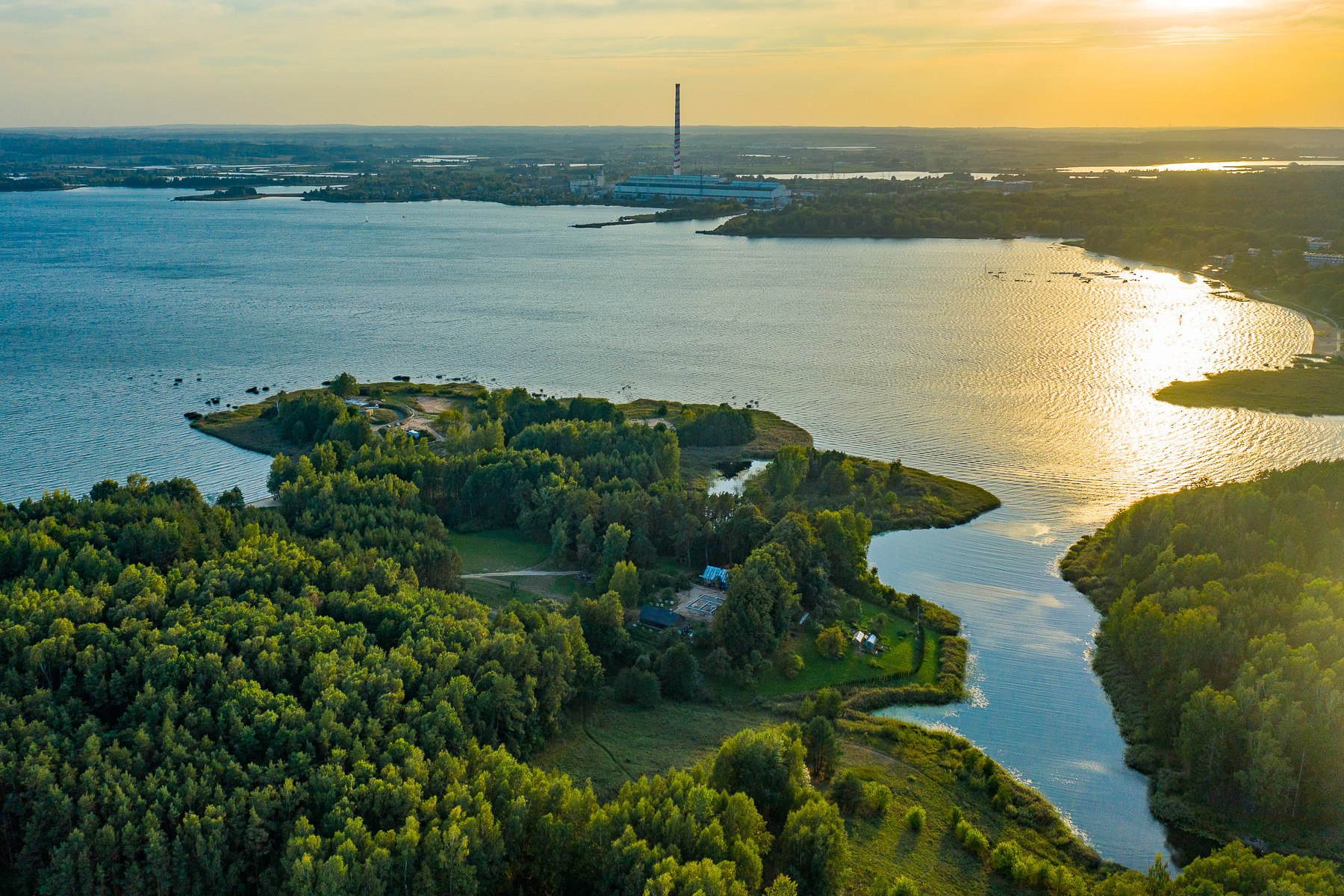
Elektrėnai Reservoir and the Power Plant

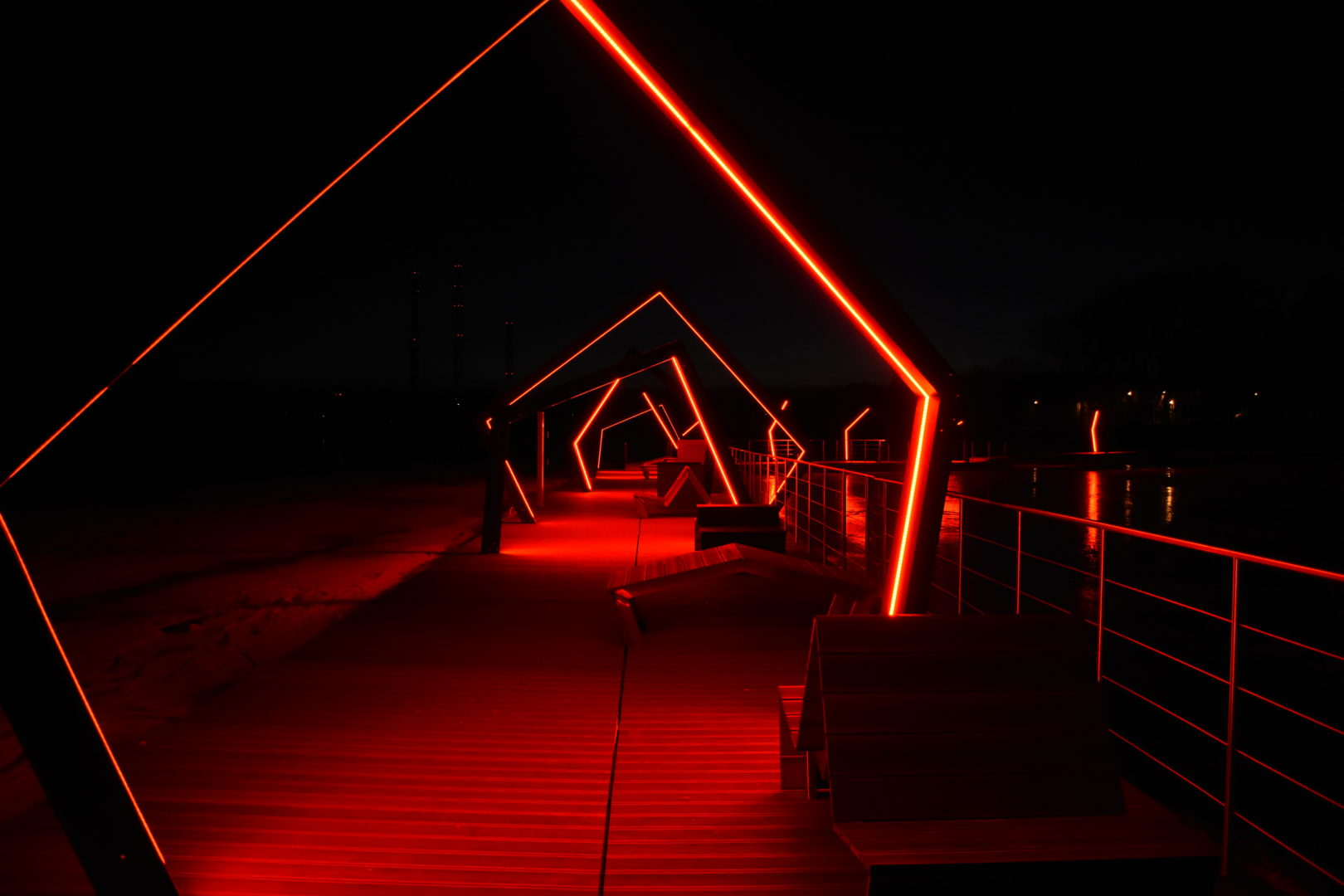
Elektrėnai Pier Bridge at night

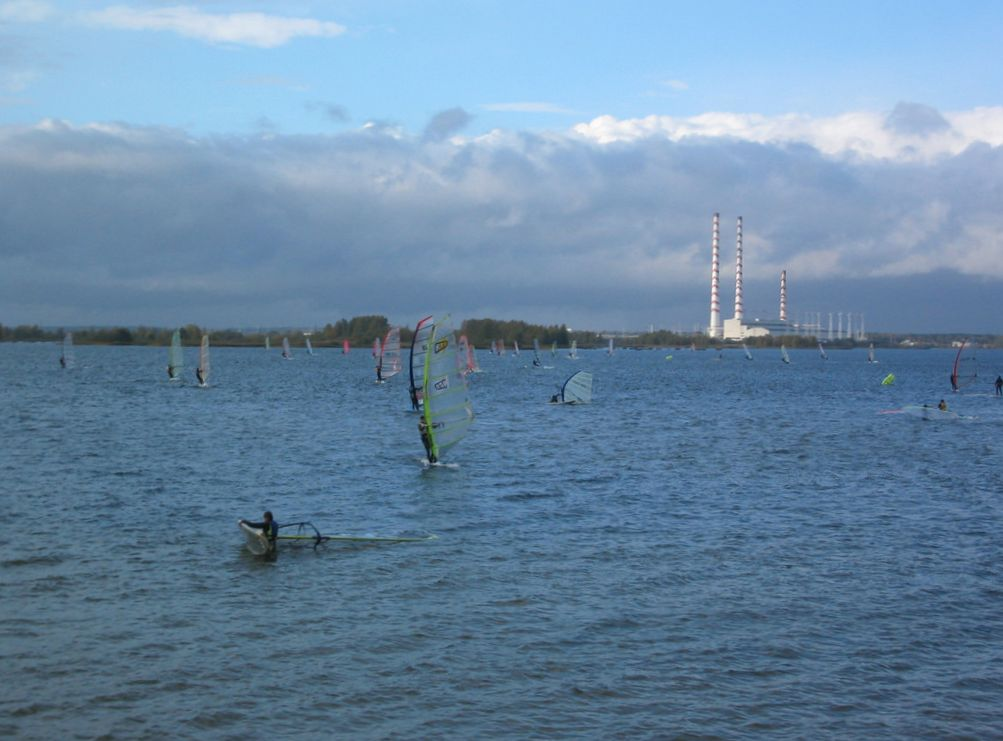
Windsurfing in Elektrėnai Reservoir
