= Lithuania Hockey League =

Ice hockey league in Lithuania

- Sport: Ice hockey
- Founded: 2010
- President: Darius Kasparaitis
- No. of teams: 2
- Country: Lithuania
- Most recent champion: SC Energija (23rd title) (2025–26)
- Most titles: SC Energija (23 titles)
- Website: www.hockey.lt

The Lithuania Hockey League (Lithuanian: Nacionaline ledo ritulio lyga) is the premier men's ice hockey league in Lithuania.

== Teams ==
Team	City	Arena	Founded	Joined	Ref
Energija/GV Elektrėnai	Elektrėnai	Elektrėnai Ice Palace	1977	1991	
Hockey Punks Vilnius	Vilnius	Pramogų Arena	2007	2013	

== Champions ==
- 1992 – SC Energija
- 1993 – SC Energija
- 1994 – SC Energija
- 1995 – SC Energija
- 1996 – SC Energija
- 1997 – SC Energija
- 1998 – SC Energija
- 1999 – SC Energija
- 2000 – Viltis Elektrėnai
- 2001 – SC Energija
- 2002 – Garsų Pasaulis Vilnius
- 2003 – SC Energija
- 2004 – SC Energija
- 2005 – SC Energija
- 2006 – SC Energija
- 2007 – SC Energija
- 2008 – SC Energija
- 2009 – SC Energija
- 2010 – Sporto Centras Elektrėnai
- 2011 – Sporto Centras Elektrėnai
- 2012 – ESSM Energija Elektrėnai
- 2013 – SC Energija
- 2014 – Delovaja Rus Kaliningrad
- 2015 – Delovaja Rus Kaliningrad
- 2016 – SC Energija
- 2017 – SC Energija
- 2018 – SC Energija
- 2019 – SC Energija
- 2020 – not finished
- 2021 – Kaunas Hockey
- 2022 – Hockey Punks
- 2023 – Kaunas City
- 2024 – SC Energija
- 2025 – Hockey Punks
- 2026 – SC Energija

== Titles by team ==
Titles	Club	Years
23	SC Energija	1992, 1993, 1994, 1995, 1996, 1997, 1998, 1999, 2001, 2003, 2004, 2005, 2006, 2007, 2008, 2009, 2013, 2016, 2017, 2018, 2019, 2024, 2026
2	Sporto Centras Elektrėnai	2010, 2011
2	Delovaja Rus Kaliningrad	2014, 2015
2	Hockey Punks	2022, 2025
1	Viltis Elektrėnai	2000
1	Garsų Pasaulis Vilnius	2002
1	ESSM Energija Elektrėnai	2012
1	Kaunas Hockey	2021
1	Kaunas City	2023
