= 2010 World Junior Ice Hockey Championships =

U20 ice hockey tournament in Saskatchewan, Canada

2010 IIHF World U20 Championship

Tournament details
- Host country: Canada
- Cities: Saskatoon, Regina
- Venue(s): Credit Union Centre and Brandt Centre (in 2 host cities)
- Dates: December 26, 2009 – January 5, 2010
- Teams: 10

Final positions
- Champions: United States (2nd title)
- Runners-up: Canada
- Third place: Sweden
- Fourth place: Switzerland

Tournament statistics
- Games played: 31
- Goals scored: 266 (8.58 per game)
- Attendance: 301,944 (9,740 per game)
- Scoring leader: (United States) Derek Stepan (14 points)

Awards
- MVP: (Canada) Jordan Eberle

The 2010 World Junior Hockey Championships (2010 WJHC), was the 34th edition of Ice Hockey World Junior Championship. The tournament was hosted by Saskatoon and Regina, Saskatchewan, Canada, from December 26, 2009, to January 5, 2010. Saskatoon had hosted the tournament once before, in 1991. The medal round, as well as all Canada's preliminary round games, took place in Saskatoon at the Credit Union Centre. The arena underwent renovations and upgrades before the 2010 tournament, including an increase in capacity. Other games were played at the Brandt Centre in Regina, which also received upgrades. In addition, pre-tournament exhibition games were held in other towns and cities throughout the province as well as Calgary, Alberta. In the gold medal match, the United States to win their second gold medal and first since 2004, after defeated the pre-tournament favourites and host country Canada 6–5 in overtime on a goal by John Carlson.

== Other host candidates ==
Initially, Switzerland was chosen to host the tournament, but later withdrew.

Three bid groups submitted letters of intent to host the 2010 tournament prior to the February 1, 2008, deadline:

- Joint bid by Halifax, Nova Scotia, and Moncton, New Brunswick;
- Joint bid by Saskatoon and Regina, Saskatchewan; and
- Joint bid by Winnipeg and Brandon, Manitoba

All three bid groups formally placed their bids before the April 1, 2008, deadline and made their final presentations to the selection committee in Toronto on June 9–10, 2008.

On July 7, 2008, Hockey Canada and the Canadian Hockey League (CHL) announced Saskatoon and Regina have been chosen to host the tournament. This was Saskatchewan's first successful bid in five recent attempts, after failing to land the 1999, 2003, 2006 and 2009 tournaments.

== Venues ==
Credit Union Centre Capacity: 14,705	Brandt Centre Capacity: 7,000
Canada – Saskatoon	Canada – Regina

== Top division ==
The lowest-ranked teams in the top division are relegated to Division I for the following year's tournament.

=== Preliminary round ===
Ten teams were divided into two groups of five, each of which play in a single round-robin format. The winner of each group proceeded directly to the tournament semifinals, with the second- and third-place finishers advancing to the quarterfinals. The remaining four teams participated in the relegation round to determine which teams will be relegated to Division I the following year.

==== Group A ====
Pos	Team	Pld	W	OTW	OTL	L	GF	GA	GD	Pts	Qualification
1	Canada	4	3	1	0	0	35	6	+29	11	Semifinals
2	United States	4	3	0	1	0	26	9	+17	10	Quarterfinals
3	Switzerland	4	2	0	0	2	11	15	−4	6	Quarterfinals
4	Slovakia	4	1	0	0	3	14	22	−8	3	Relegation round
5	Latvia	4	0	0	0	4	9	43	−34	0	Relegation round

Source: IIHF

All times are local (Central Time Zone – UTC−6).

December 26, 2009; 15:00	Latvia	0 – 16 (0–5, 0–6, 0–5)	Canada	Credit Union Centre (capacity: 14,705); Attendance: 12,469 (84.8%)

Game reference

Raimonds Ermics
Jānis Kalniņš
Goalies
Jake Allen
Referees:
(Sweden) Morgan Johansson
(Sweden) Christier Larking
Linesmen:
(Finland) Sakari Suominen
(Sweden) Christian Tillerkvist-Jonsson

0–1	00:36 – Bourque (Ellis, Cormier)
0–2	04:22 – Kadri (Pietrangelo, Hall) (PP)
0–3	06:39 – Bourque (Schenn) (PP)
0–4	11:43 – Adam (Della Rovere)
0–5	17:52 – Cormier (Hamonic, Bourque)
0–6	24:49 – Eberle (McMillan, Pietrangelo)
0–7	29:28 – Hamonic (Pietrangelo)
0–8	30:26 – Kadri (Hall)
0–9	38:10 – Kozun (Bourque, Schenn) (PP)
0–10	39:40 – Eberle (Pietrangelo) (PP)
0–11	39:57 – Henrique (Bourque)
0–12	41:33 – Cormier (Kozun)
0–13	44:35 – McMillan (Kozun, Adam) (PP)
0–14	49:19 – Kozun (Bourque, Cormier)
0–15	58:28 – Bourque (Kozun) (PP)
0–16	59:32 – Adam (Caron)

16 min
Penalties
14 min
10
Shots
67

December 26, 2009; 19:00	Slovakia	3 – 7 (2–1, 1–4, 0–2)	United States	Credit Union Centre (capacity: 14,705); Attendance: 11,318 (77.0%)

Game reference

Marek Čiliak
Goalies
Mike Lee
Referees:
(Russia) Konstantin Olenin
(Russia) Alexei Ravodin
Linesmen:
(Czech Republic) Vit Lederer
(Russia) Roman Shikhanov

Gašparovič (Illo) (PP) – 02:15	1–0
Bakoš (Illo, Marinčin) (PP2) – 05:33	2–0
	2–1	09:34 – Carlson (Stepan)
	2–2	22:50 – Morin
	2–3	25:39 – Stepan (Carlson, Warsofsky)
	2–4	26:36 – Donovan (Kreider, Fowler) (PP)
Pánik (Šiška, Viedenský) (PP) – 33:14	3–4
	3–5	33:54 – Kristo (Stepan, D'Amigo)
	3–6	40:58 – Schroeder (Palmieri)
	3–7	46:34 – D'Amigo (Kristo)

16 min
Penalties
35 min
20
Shots
46

December 27, 2009; 15:00	United States	3 – 0 (0–0, 1–0, 2–0)	Switzerland	Credit Union Centre (capacity: 14,705); Attendance: 12,853 (87.4%)

Game reference

Jack Campbell
Goalies
Benjamin Conz
Referees:
(Sweden) Morgan Johansson
(Czech Republic) Vladimír Šindler
Linesmen:
(Czech Republic) Vit Lederer
(Germany) Sirko Schulz

Kreider (Fowler, Stepan) (PP) – 25:27	1–0
Donovan (Bourque, Palmieri) – 52:35	2–0
Jenks (Warsofsky, Morin) – 56:36	3–0

6 min
Penalties
10 min
49
Shots
22

December 27, 2009; 19:00	Slovakia	8 – 3 (5–0, 2–2, 1–1)	Latvia	Credit Union Centre (capacity: 14,705); Attendance: 12,628 (85.9%)

Game reference

Marek Čiliak
Goalies
Raimonds Ermics
Jānis Kalniņš
Referees:
(Czech Republic) Antonín Jeřábek
(Finland) Tom Laaksonen
Linesmen:
(Russia) Roman Shikhanov
(Finland) Sakari Suominen

Pánik (Viedenský) – 00:33	1–0
Pánik (Viedenský) – 03:44	2–0
Viedenský (Pánik, Tatar) (PP) – 05:31	3–0
Tatar (Šiška, Viedenský) – 13:14	4–0
Gašparovič (Marinčin, Illo) – 17:06	5–0
Rais – 29:34	6–0
Tatar (Bakoš, Hudáček) – 33:00	7–0
	7–1	33:27 – Lipsbergs (Vigners, Ķēniņš)
	7–2	34:21 – Bukarts (Freibergs) (PP)
Illo (Gašparovič, Mlynarovič) – 49:48	8–2
	8–3	50:44 – Bukarts (Cinks, Vilkoits)

12 min
Penalties
14 min
41
Shots
29

December 28, 2009; 15:00	Canada	6 – 0 (2–0, 3–0, 1–0)	Switzerland	Credit Union Centre (capacity: 14,705); Attendance: 13,301 (90.5%)

Game reference

Jake Allen
Goalies
Benjamin Conz
Referees:
(Russia) Konstantin Olenin
(Russia) Alexei Ravodin
Linesmen:
(Germany) Sirko Schulz
(Sweden) Christian Tillerkvist-Jonsson

McMillan (Eberle, Schenn) – 00:23	1–0
Pietrangelo (Hall, Eberle) (PP) – 08:14	2–0
Kadri (Ellis, Hamonic) (PP) – 21:06	3–0
Eberle (Ellis, Kadri) (PP) – 21:26	4–0
McMillan (Eberle, de Hann) – 23:42	5–0
McMillan (Eberle, Cowen) (PP) – 59:23	6–0

8 min
Penalties
14 min
54
Shots
15

December 29, 2009; 15:00	Latvia	1 – 12 (0–6, 1–1, 0–5)	United States	Credit Union Centre (capacity: 14,705); Attendance: 11,494 (78.2%)

Game reference

Jānis Kalniņš
Goalies
Mike Lee
Referees:
(Finland) Tom Laaksonen
(Sweden) Christier Larking
Linesmen:
(Czech Republic) Vit Lederer
(Sweden) Christian Tillerkvist-Jonsson

	0–1	02:30 – Kristo (McRae, Palmieri)
	0–2	09:40 – Zucker (Bourque, Donovan)
	0–3	11:12 – Kristo (McRae, D'Amigo (PP)
	0–4	14:40 – Jenks (Lashoff, Morin) (PP)
	0–5	19:02 – Kreider (Schroeder, Stepan) (PP)
	0–6	19:38 –Johnson (Lashoff, Gardiner)
Kauss (Bukrats, Cinks) (PP) – 27:00	1–6
	1–7	29:38 – Kreider (Schroeder, Stepan) (PP)
	1–8	41:22 – Stepan (Palmieri, Johnson)
	1–9	47:49 – Zucker (Ramage, Gardiner)
	1–10	49:42 – Stepan (D'Amigo, Palmieri)
	1–11	58:46 – Kreider (PS)
	1–12	59:30 – Morin (Palmieri, Ramage) (PP)

18 min
Penalties
16 min
19
Shots
62

December 29, 2009; 19:00	Canada	8 – 2 (3–0, 4–1, 1–1)	Slovakia	Credit Union Centre (capacity: 14,705); Attendance: 13,232 (90.0%)

Game reference

Martin Jones
Goalies
Marek Čiliak
Tomáš Halász
Referees:
(Czech Republic) Antonín Jeřábek
(Czech Republic) Vladimír Šindler
Linesmen:
(Germany) Sirko Schulz
(Finland) Sakari Suominen

Hall (Ellis, Eberle) (PP) – 07:18	1–0
Pietrangelo (Cormier, Bourque) – 07:39	2–0
Hall – 10:43	3–0
Adam – 25:08	4–0
Ellis (Hall, Kadri) (PP) – 33:20	5–0
	5–1	37:25 – Pánik (Hraško, Rais) (PP)
Hall (Pietrangelo) – 37:41	6–1
Schenn (Kozun, Pietrangelo) – 38:39	7–1
Della Rovere (Schenn) (SH) – 52:41	8–1
	8–2	53:43 – Bakoš (Šťastný)

18 min
Penalties
18 min
35
Shots
27

December 30, 2009; 15:00	Switzerland	7 – 5 (2–3, 1–1, 4–1)	Latvia	Credit Union Centre (capacity: 14,705); Attendance: 13,193 (89.7%)

Game reference

Benjamin Conz
Goalies
Jānis Kalniņš
Raimonds Ermics
Referees:
(Sweden) Morgan Johansson
(Russia) Konstantin Olenin
Linesmen:
(Czech Republic) Vit Lederer
(Russia) Roman Shikhanov

Antonietti (Josi, Marlof) – 02:40	1–0
Fuglister (Niederreiter) (PP) – 04:59	2–0
	2–1	06:15 Ķēniņš (Freibergs)
	2–2	09:24 – Ķēniņš (Freibergs)
	2–3	10:58 – Bukarts (Cinks) (PP)
Josi (McGregor) – 24:26	3–3
	3–4	26:29 – Vigners (Vilkoits)
Niederreiter (Josi, Scherwey) (PP) – 44:42	4–4
Webber (Schäppi, Geering) – 45:26	5–4
McGregor (Stoop, Antonietti) – 48:53	6–4
Jorg (Niederreiter) – 54:32	7–4
	7–5	54:46 – Bukarts (Ķēniņš)

10 min
Penalties
12 min
34
Shots
29

December 31, 2009; 15:00	Switzerland	4 – 1 (0–0, 1–0, 3–1	Slovakia	Credit Union Centre (capacity: 14,705); Attendance: 13,177 (89.6%)

Game reference

Benjamin Conz
Matthias Mischler
Goalies
Tomáš Halász
Referees:
(Russia) Alexei Volodin
(Czech Republic) Vladimír Šindler
Linesmen:
(Russia) Roman Shikhanov
(Sweden) Christian Tillerkvist-Jonsson

Niederreiter (Fuglister, Geering) – 27:27	1–0
Niederreiter – 47:33	2–0
	2–1	53:02 – Pánik (Rais, Hraško)
Scherwey (Geering, Stoop) (PP) – 56:08	3–1
Jörg (Niederreiter) (ENG) – 57:33	4–1

6 min
Penalties
6 min
31
Shots
41

December 31, 2009; 19:00	United States	4 – 5 GWS (1–1, 2–1, 1–2) (OT: 0–0) (SO: 2–3)	Canada	Credit Union Centre (capacity: 14,705); Attendance: 15,171 (103.2%)

Game reference

Jack Campbell
Goalies
Jake Allen
Referees:
(Finland) Tom Laaksonen
(Sweden) Christer Larking
Linesmen:
(Germany) Sirko Schulz
(Finland) Sakari Suominen

	0–1	02:03 – Della Rovere (Adam, Caron)
McRae (D'Amigo) (PP) – 03:40	1–1
Schroeder (Johnson) (SH) – 27:08	2–1
	2–2	31:15 – Eberle (Schenn, Scandella)
Johnson (D'Amigo) (SH) – 39:50	3–2
Kristo (Stepan) – 41:01	4–2
	4–3	50:03 – Eberle (Schenn, McMillan)
	4–4	55:45 – Pietrangelo (SH)

Kristo
Morin
Schroeder (miss)
Shootout
Eberle
Kadri
Kozun
12 min
Penalties
8 min
28
Shots
34

==== Group B ====
Pos	Team	Pld	W	OTW	OTL	L	GF	GA	GD	Pts	Qualification
1	Sweden	4	4	0	0	0	28	6	+22	12	Semifinals
2	Russia	4	3	0	0	1	14	8	+6	9	Quarterfinals
3	Finland	4	2	0	0	2	15	13	+2	6	Quarterfinals
4	Czech Republic	4	1	0	0	3	13	20	−7	3	Relegation round
5	Austria	4	0	0	0	4	7	30	−23	0	Relegation round

Source: IIHF

All times are local (Central Time Zone – UTC−6).

December 26, 2009; 13:00	Czech Republic	1 – 10 (0–4, 1–2, 0–4)	Sweden	Brandt Centre (capacity: 7,000); Attendance: 5,191 (74.2%)

Game reference

Jakub Sedláček
Pavel Francouz
Goalies
Jacob Markström
Referees:
(Slovakia) Vladimír Baluška
(Canada) Derek Zalaski
Linesmen:
(Canada) Jeff Jobson
(Canada) Matt Traub

	0–1	07:42 – Petersson (Erixon, Pääjärvi-Svensson)
	0–2	15:20 – Rödin (Ekman-Larsson)
	0–3	17:25 – Tedenby (Krüger, Rundblad)
	0–4	19:05 – Lander (Petersson, Pääjärvi-Svensson)
	0–5	22:34 – Pääjärvi-Svensson (Erixon, Petersson) (PP)
Káňa (Knotek, Vincour) (PP) – 25:01	1–5
	1–6	25:22 – Klingberg (Lundberg)
	1–7	40:51 – Erixon (Pääjärvi-Svensson, Johansson) (PP)
	1–8	43:00 – Lander (Rödin)
	1–9	51:21 – Silfverbeg (Rödin)
	1–10	54:08 – Larsson (Pääjärvi-Svensson, Johansson) (PP)

14 min
Penalties
10 min
21
Shots
46

December 26, 2009; 17:00	Russia	6 – 2 (4–1, 1–1, 1–0)	Austria	Brandt Centre (capacity: 7,000); Attendance: 4,990 (71.3%)

Game reference

Igor Bobkov
Goalies
Lorenz Hirn
Referees:
(Canada) Darcy Burchell
(United States) Kaval Keith
Linesmen:
(United States) Paul Carnathan
(Slovakia) Jozef Tvrdoň

Trunev (Khokhryakov) – 01:58	1–0
	1–1	11:38 – Komarek (Wolf, Scholz) (PP)
Chudinov (Petrov, Pivtsakin) (PP) – 14:32	2–1
Kuznetsov (Orlov, Timkin) – 18:26	3–1
Tarasenko (Orlov) (PP) – 19:54	4–1
Kuznetsov (Kulyomin) – 26:20	5–1
	5–2	30:50 – Harlt (Maier)
Petrov (Chudinov) (SH) – 52:00	6–2

14 min
Penalties
24 min
33
Shots
16

December 27, 2009; 13:00	Austria	3 – 7 (0–2, 3–2, 0–3)	Sweden	Brandt Centre (capacity: 7,000); Attendance: 5,025 (71.8%)

Game reference

Marco Wieser
Goalies
Anders Nilsson
Referees:
(Slovakia) Vladimír Baluška
(Germany) Daniel Piechaczek
Linesmen:
(Canada) Matt Traub
(Slovakia) Jozef Tvrdoň

	0–1	00:41 – Josefson (Ekman-Larsson)
	0–2	18:36 – Ekman-Larsson (Larsson, Josefson) (PP)
	0–3	22:41 – Rödin (Silfverberg, Lander)
Pallestrang (Hartl) (PP) – 26:54	1–3
Heinrich (Kristler, Ulmer) (PP) – 36:41	2–3
Komarek (Heinrich, Kristler) – 38:13	3–3
	3–4	39:47 – Rödin (Larsson)
	3–5	53:33 – Ekholm (Krüger, Josefson)
	3–6	58:12 – Petersson (Andersson, Johansson) (PP)
	3–7	59:22 – Ekman-Larsson (Lander, Rödin) (PP)

20 min
Penalties
12 min
24
Shots
54

December 27, 2009; 17:00	Czech Republic	3 – 4 (2–0, 1–1, 0–3)	Finland	Brandt Centre (capacity: 7,000); Attendance: 5,572 (79.6%)

Game reference

Jakub Sedláček
Goalies
Joni Ortio
Referees:
(Canada) Darcy Burchell
(United States) Keith Kaval
Linesmen:
(United States) Paul Carnathan
(Switzerland) Daniel Wirth

Kubalík (Roth, Nestrašil) (PP) – 12:23	1–0
Káňa (Vincour, Knotek) (PP) – 16:01	2–0
Horák (Kubalík, Jordán) – 27:53	3–0
	3–1	37:13 – Hartikainen (Granlund)
	3–2	43:40 – Vatanen (Ortio) (PP)
	3–3	56:46 – Vatanen (Myttynen, Lajunen)
	3–4	57:48 – Rask (Eronen, Nättinen)

16 min
Penalties
12 min
21
Shots
41

December 28, 2009; 17:00	Finland	0 – 2 (0–1, 0–1, 0–0)	Russia	Brandt Centre (capacity: 7,000); Attendance: 5,675 (81.1%)

Game reference
Joni Ortio	Goalies	Igor Bobkov	Referees: (Germany) Daniel Piechaczek (Canada) Derek Zalaski; Linesmen: (Canada) Jeff Jobson (Switzerland) Daniel Wirth
0–1 / 06:51 – Khokhryakov (Filatov, Petrov); 0–2 / 29:16 – Filatov (Chudinov) (PP)			Referees: (Germany) Daniel Piechaczek (Canada) Derek Zalaski; Linesmen: (Canada) Jeff Jobson (Switzerland) Daniel Wirth
26 min	Penalties	24 min	Referees: (Germany) Daniel Piechaczek (Canada) Derek Zalaski; Linesmen: (Canada) Jeff Jobson (Switzerland) Daniel Wirth
46	Shots	17	Referees: (Germany) Daniel Piechaczek (Canada) Derek Zalaski; Linesmen: (Canada) Jeff Jobson (Switzerland) Daniel Wirth

December 29, 2009; 13:00	Austria	1 – 7 (1–1, 0–3, 0–3)	Czech Republic	Brandt Centre (capacity: 7,000); Attendance: 5,334 (76.2%)

Game reference

Lorenz Hirn
Goalies
Jakub Sedláček
Referees:
(United States) Keith Kaval
(Germany) Daniel Piechaczek
Linesmen:
(Canada) Matt Traub
(Slovakia) Jozef Tvrdoň

	0–1	14:21 – Knotek (Káňa) (PP)
Heinrich (Kristler, Komarek) – 15:38	1–1
	1–2	23:27 – Novotný (Roth, Nestrašil) (PP)
	1–3	31:58 – Roth (Nestrašil, Kubalík) (PP)
	1–4	39:53 – Nestrašil (Kousal, Roth) (PP)
	1–5	49:40 – Kubalík (Kovář, Gudas)
	1–6	51:40 – Kousal (Kubalík, Novotný) (PP)
	1–7	56.25 – Ostřížek (Roth, Knotek)

16 min
Penalties
6 min
22
Shots
56

December 29, 2009; 17:00	Sweden	4 – 1 (2–0, 1–1, 1–0)	Russia	Brandt Centre (capacity: 7,000); Attendance: 6,234 (89.1%)

Game reference

Jacob Markström
Goalies
Igor Bobkov
Referees:
(Canada) Darcy Burchell
(Canada) Derek Zalaski
Linesmen:
(United States) Paul Carnathan
(Switzerland) Daniel Wirth

Petersson (Pääjärvi-Svensson) – 03:32	1–0
Pääjärvi-Svensson (Johansson) (SH) – 07:24	2–0
	2–1	31:29 – Petrov (Filatov)
Petersson (Pääjärvi-Svensson, Ekman-Larsson) – 38:03	3–1
Brodin – 45:30	4–1

10 min
Penalties
8 min
45
Shots
37

December 30, 2009; 13:00	Finland	10 – 1	Austria	Brandt Centre (capacity: 7,000); Attendance: 5,193 (74.2%)

Game reference
Joonas Rask 00:58; Jani Lajunen 02:04; Mikael Granlund (PP1) 05:49; Aleksi Laakso (PP1) 07:37; Toni Rajala (PP1) 11:07; Jyri Niemi (PP1) 29:28; Teemu Hartikainen (PP1) 32:17; Jyri Niemi (PP1) 39:39; Matias Sointu (PP1) 50:56; Eero Elo (PP1) 51:31 / Goals / 35:26 (PP1) Konstantin Komarek

December 31, 2009; 13:00	Sweden	7 – 1	Finland	Brandt Centre (capacity: 7,000); Attendance: 5,145 (73.5%)

Game reference
André Petersson 16:52; Dennis Rasmussen 25:24; Mattias Tedenby 33:44; Jacob Josefson 39:52; Magnus Pääjärvi-Svensson 41:13; Jacob Josefson 52:53; Marcus Johansson 58:54 / Goals / 42:38 Teemu Hartikainen

December 31, 2009; 17:00	Russia	5 – 2	Czech Republic	Brandt Centre (capacity: 7,000); Attendance: 5,293 (75.6%)

Game reference
Vladimir Tarasenko (PP1) 06:46; Kirill Petrov 32:01; Vladimir Tarasenko 54:53; Maxim Chudinov 58:48; Alexander Burmistrov 59:19 / Goals / 36:30 (PP1) Jan Káňa; 54:01 Štěpán Novotný

=== Relegation round ===
Results from any games that were played during the preliminary round were carried forward to the relegation round.

Pos	Team	Pld	W	OTW	OTL	L	GF	GA	GD	Pts	Relegation
1	Czech Republic	3	3	0	0	0	22	5	+17	9	
2	Slovakia	3	2	0	0	1	13	10	+3	6	
3	Latvia	3	1	0	0	2	11	22	−11	3	Relegated to the 2011 Division I
4	Austria	3	0	0	0	3	7	16	−9	0	Relegated to the 2011 Division I

Source: IIHF

All times are local (Central Time Zone – UTC−6).

January 2, 2010; 12:00	Slovakia	3 – 2	Austria	Credit Union Centre (capacity: 14,705); Attendance: 8,634 (58.7%)

Game reference
Tomáš Tatar (PP1) 06:47; Richard Pánik (PP1) 14:34; Andrej Šťastný 40:27 / Goals / 22:30 Andreas Kristler; 33:09 (PP1) Dominique Heinrich

January 3, 2010; 12:00	Czech Republic	10 – 2	Latvia	Credit Union Centre (capacity: 14,705); Attendance: 8,294 (56.4%)

Game reference
Tomáš Knotek 02:29; David Ostřížek 03:31; Štěpán Novotný (PP1) 14:44; Michal Poletín 18:50; Jan Káňa 19:25; Tomáš Knotek 25:45; Robert Kousal (SH1) 38:18; Jakub Jeřábek (PP1) 43:08; Tomáš Kubalík (PP1) 53:38 / Goals / 22:57 Raimonds Vilkoits; 33:23 Raimonds Vilkoits

January 4, 2010; 12:00	Slovakia	2 – 5	Czech Republic	Credit Union Centre (capacity: 14,705); Attendance: 6,221 (42.3%)

Game reference
Radoslav Illo 07:48; Samuel Mlynarovič 36:08 / Goals / 09:55 (PP1) Vladimír Roth; 30:19 Jan Kovář; 36:45 (PP1) Jan Kovář; 38:12 Tomáš Kubalík; 55:44 Jan Kovář

January 4, 2010; 16:00	Latvia	6 – 4	Austria	Credit Union Centre (capacity: 14,705); Attendance: 7,238 (49.2%)

Game reference
Robert Bukarts (PP1) 6:14; Gunārs Skvorcovs 12:42; Robert Mazins 12:59; Robert Bukarts 14:10; Mike Indrasis (PP1) 48:55; Robert Mazins (PP1) 51:16 / Goals / 7:50 (PP1) Konstantin Komarek; 21:18 (PP1) Andreas Kristler; 25:36 (PP2) Konstantin Komarek; 53:28 (PP1) Markus Unterweger

=== Final round ===
Quarterfinals
A2	United States	6
B3	Finland	2
B2	Russia	2
A3	Switzerland (OT)	3

Semifinals
B1	Sweden	2
A2	United States	5
A1	Canada	6
A3	Switzerland	1

Final
A2	United States (OT)	6
A1	Canada	5
Third place
B1	Sweden	11
A3	Switzerland	4

==== Quarterfinals ====
January 2, 2010; 16:00	Russia	2 – 3 OT	Switzerland	Credit Union Centre (capacity: 14,705); Attendance: 12,278 (83.5%)

Game reference
Vladimir Tarasenko 38:44; Kirill Petrov 39:00 / Goals / 28:25 Michael Loichat; 59:27 Nino Niederreiter; 69:46 Nino Niederreiter

January 2, 2010; 20:00	United States	6 – 2 (2–0, 1–1, 3–1)	Finland	Credit Union Centre (capacity: 14,705); Attendance: 12,701 (86.4%)

Game reference

Mike Lee
Goalies
Joni Ortio
Referees:
(Slovakia) Vladimír Baluška
(Canada) Derek Zalaski
Linesmen:
(Canada) Matt Traub
(Switzerland) Daniel Wirth

Palmeri (McRae, Schroeder) – 02:14	1–0
Donovan (Schroeder, Stepan) (PP) – 06:34	2–0
D'Amigo (Kristo, Stepan) – 32:51	3–0
	3–1	35:17 – Elo (Kivistö, Lajunen)
Kreider (Morin, Jenks) – 42:05	4–1
	4–2	54:31 – Rask (Pakarinen, Sointu)
D'Amigo (ENG) – 59:07	5–2
Kristo (Schroeder, Carlson) – 59:16	6–2

4 min
Penalties
2 min
26
Shots
44

==== Semifinals ====
January 3, 2010; 16:00	Canada	6 – 1 (1–0, 2–1, 3–0)	Switzerland	Credit Union Centre (capacity: 14,705); Attendance: 13,427 (91.3%)

Game reference

Jake Allen
Goalies
Benjamin Conz
Referees:
(United States) Keith Kaval
(Sweden) Christer Larking
Linesmen:
(United States) Paul Carnathan
(Sweden) Christian Tillerkvist-Jonsson

Eberle (Ellis, Pietrangelo) (PP) – 03:48	1–0
Scandella (Bourque, McMillan) (SH) – 27:26	2–0
Hall (Kadri, Della Rovere) – 29:11	3–0
	3–1	Jörg (Geering, Niederreiter) (PP) – 32:27
Schenn (McMillan, Pietrangelo) – 42:58	4–1
Della Rovere (Caron, Adam) – 56:40	5–1
Hall (Scandella, Teubert) – 57:09	6–1

10 min
Penalties
39 min
44
Shots
21

January 3, 2010; 20:00	Sweden	2 – 5 (0–1, 2–1, 0–3)	United States	Credit Union Centre (capacity: 14,705); Attendance: 12,137 (82.5%)

Game reference

Jacob Markström
Goalies
Mike Lee
Referees:
(Canada) Darcy Burchell
(Finland) Tom Laaksonen
Linesmen:
(Czech Republic) Vit Lederer
(Germany) Sirko Schulz

	0–1	01:24 – Johnson (Palmieri)
Lander (Rödin, Andersson) – 24:17	1–1
Lander (Rödin, Silfverberg) – 32:17	2–1
	2–2	35:06 – D'Amigo (Carlson, Gardiner)
	2–3	52:34 – Carlson (Morin)
	2–4	55:32 – D'Amigo (Stepan) (SH)
	2–5	59:05 – Jenks (Morin) (ENG)

35 min
Penalties
8 min
29
Shots
35

==== 5th place playoff ====
January 4, 2010; 20:00	Russia	3 – 4	Finland	Credit Union Centre (capacity: 14,705); Attendance: 11,214 (76.3%)

Game reference
Maxim Trunev 05:36; Alexander Burmistrov 19:37; Alexander Burmistrov 51:07 / Goals / 16:08 (PP1) Teemu Eronen; 38:32 (PP1) Pekka Jormakka; 46:14 (PP2) Jyri Niemi; 54:02 (PP1) Teemu Hartikainen

==== Bronze medal game ====
January 5, 2010; 15:00	Switzerland	4 – 11	Sweden	Credit Union Centre (capacity: 14,705); Attendance: 12,121 (82.4%)

Game reference
Michael Loichat (PP1) 26:30; Dominik Schlumpf (PP1) 35:44; Jeffrey Fuglister 35:55; Nino Niederreiter (PP2) 37:51 / Goals / 03:59 Dennis Rasmussen; 11:44 Anton Lander; 14:32 (PP1) André Petersson; 18:50 André Petersson; 19:04 Mattias Tedenby; 23:17 Jakob Silfverberg; 23:56 Daniel Brodin; 30:05 (PP1) Jakob Silfverberg; 33:50 (PP1) Daniel Brodin; 38:40 (SH1) André Petersson; 53:37 (PP1) David Rundblad

==== Gold medal game ====
January 5, 2010; 19:00	Canada	5 – 6 OT (2–2, 1–1, 2–2, 0–1)	United States	Credit Union Centre (capacity: 14,705); Attendance: 15,171 (103.2%)

Game reference

Jake Allen
Martin Jones
Goalies
Mike Lee
Jack Campbell
Referees:
(Finland) Tom Laaksonen
(Sweden) Christier Larking
Linesmen:
(Germany) Sirko Schulz
(Sweden) Christian Tillerkvist-Jonsson

Adam (Caron) – 02:40	1–0
	1–1	13:56 – Kreider (Palmieri, Jenks)
	1–2	14:32 – Schroeder (Bourque)
Nemisz (Kadri, Hall) – 16:03	2–2
	2–3	21:03 – Carlson (Kristo, McRae) (PP)
Hall (Adam) – 23:56	3–3
	3–4	44:12 – D'Amigo (Stepan)
	3–5	46:23 – Stepan (D'Amigo)
Eberle (Pietrangelo, Hall) (PP) – 57:11	4–5
Eberle (Ellis, Kadri) – 58:25	5–5
	5–6	64:31 – Carlson (Ramage)

16 min
Penalties
6 min
41
Shots
37

=== Top 10 scorers ===
Pos	Player	Country	GP	G	A	Pts	+/-	PIM
1	Derek Stepan	United States	7	4	10	14	+9	4
2	Jordan Eberle	Canada	6	8	5	13	+3	4
3	Taylor Hall	Canada	6	6	6	12	+3	0
4	Jerry D'Amigo	United States	7	6	6	12	+7	0
5	Alex Pietrangelo	Canada	6	3	9	12	+9	14
6	André Petersson	Sweden	6	8	3	11	+8	4
7	Nino Niederreiter	Switzerland	7	6	4	10	-2	10
8	Kirill Petrov	Russia	6	4	6	10	+7	6
9	Magnus Pääjärvi-Svensson	Sweden	6	3	7	10	+6	2
9	Anton Rödin	Sweden	6	3	7	10	+4	2

=== Top 10 goalscorers ===
Pos	Player	Country	GP	G	Shots	SG%	PPG	SHG
1	Jordan Eberle	Canada	6	8	25	32.00	4	0
1	André Petersson	Sweden	6	8	17	47.06	2	1
3	Roberts Bukarts	Latvia	6	6	25	24.00	3	0
3	Taylor Hall	Canada	6	6	21	28.57	2	0
3	Richard Pánik	Slovakia	6	6	32	18.75	3	0
6	Jerry D'Amigo	United States	7	6	23	26.09	0	1
6	Chris Kreider	United States	7	6	25	24.00	3	0
6	Nino Niederreiter	Switzerland	7	6	26	23.08	2	0
9	Konstantin Komarek	Austria	6	5	12	41.67	4	0
9	Anton Lander	Sweden	6	5	18	27.78	0	0

=== Goaltending leaders ===
(minimum 40% team's total ice time)

Pos	Player	Country	MINS	GA	Sv%	GAA	SO
1	Igor Bobkov	Russia	343:05	14	93.00	2.45	1
2	Jacob Markström	Sweden	298:50	11	92.72	2.21	0
3	Mike Lee	United States	263:56	11	90.76	2.50	0
4	Jake Allen	Canada	291:23	10	90.20	2.06	2
5	Benjamin Conz	Switzerland	428:10	34	89.31	4.76	0

=== Tournament awards ===
Most Valuable Player

- (Canada) Jordan Eberle

All-star team

- Goaltender: (Switzerland) Benjamin Conz
- Defencemen: (Canada) Alex Pietrangelo, (United States) John Carlson
- Forwards: (Canada) Jordan Eberle, (United States) Derek Stepan, (Switzerland) Nino Niederreiter

IIHF best player awards

- Goaltender: (Switzerland) Benjamin Conz
- Defenceman: (Canada) Alex Pietrangelo
- Forward: (Canada) Jordan Eberle

=== Final standings ===
	Team
1st place, gold medalist(s)	United States
2nd place, silver medalist(s)	Canada
3rd place, bronze medalist(s)	Sweden
4th	Switzerland
5th	Finland
6th	Russia
7th	Czech Republic
8th	Slovakia
9th	Latvia
10th	Austria

Relegated to the 2011 Division I

=== IIHF broadcasting rights ===
Country	Broadcaster
Canada	TSN*
Canada	TSN2
Canada	RDS
Czech Republic	Czech Television
France; Great Britain; Ireland; Italy; Germany; Greece; Hungary; Russia; Bulgaria; Poland; Portugal; Romania; Serbia; Turkey; Denmark; Ukraine	Eurosport 2
Finland	MTV3
Russia	NTV Plus Sport
Slovakia	STV
Sweden	SVT
United States	NHL Network

== Division I ==
=== Group A ===
The Division I Group A tournament was played in Megève and Saint-Gervais-les-Bains, France, from December 14 to December 20, 2009.

Pos	Team	Pld	W	OTW	OTL	L	GF	GA	GD	Pts	Promotion or relegation
1	Germany	5	5	0	0	0	27	3	+24	15	Promoted to the 2011 Top Division
2	Denmark	5	4	0	0	1	21	9	+12	12	
3	Slovenia	5	2	1	0	2	8	12	−4	8	
4	Ukraine	5	1	0	1	3	15	23	−8	4	
5	Japan	5	1	0	0	4	9	26	−17	3	
6	France (H)	5	1	0	0	4	9	16	−7	3	Relegated to the 2011 Division II

Source: IIHF
(H) Host

=== Group B ===
The Division I Group B tournament was played in Gdańsk, Poland, from December 14 to December 20, 2009.

Pos	Team	Pld	W	OTW	OTL	L	GF	GA	GD	Pts	Promotion or relegation
1	Norway	5	4	1	0	0	33	8	+25	14	Promoted to the 2011 Top Division
2	Belarus	5	3	0	2	0	30	12	+18	11	
3	Italy	5	2	1	0	2	8	8	0	8	
4	Kazakhstan	5	2	0	0	3	20	16	+4	6	
5	Croatia	5	1	0	0	4	14	51	−37	3	
6	Poland (H)	5	1	0	0	4	12	22	−10	3	Relegated to the 2011 Division II

Source: IIHF
(H) Host

== Division II ==
=== Group A ===
The Division II Group A tournament was played in Debrecen, Hungary, from December 13 to December 19, 2009.

Pos	Team	Pld	W	OTW	OTL	L	GF	GA	GD	Pts	Promotion or relegation
1	Great Britain	5	3	2	0	0	51	11	+40	13	Promoted to the 2011 Division I
2	Hungary (H)	5	4	0	1	0	66	8	+58	13	
3	Spain	5	3	0	1	1	30	17	+13	10	
4	South Korea	5	2	0	0	3	20	18	+2	6	
5	China	5	1	0	0	4	8	48	−40	3	
6	Mexico	5	0	0	0	5	4	77	−73	0	Relegated to the 2011 Division III

Source: IIHF
(H) Host

=== Group B ===
The Division II Group B tournament was played in Narva, Estonia, from December 12 to December 18, 2009.

Pos	Team	Pld	W	OTW	OTL	L	GF	GA	GD	Pts	Promotion or relegation
1	Lithuania	5	5	0	0	0	34	12	+22	15	Promoted to the 2011 Division I
2	Netherlands	5	4	0	0	1	26	19	+7	12	
3	Romania	5	2	1	0	2	21	21	0	8	
4	Belgium	5	1	1	0	3	15	24	−9	5	
5	Estonia (H)	5	0	0	3	2	15	24	−9	3	
6	Serbia	5	0	1	0	4	17	28	−11	2	Relegated to the 2011 Division III

Source: IIHF
(H) Host

== Division III ==
The Division III tournament was played in Istanbul, Turkey, from January 4 to January 10, 2010.

=== Group ===
Position	Team	Promotion
1	Australia	Promoted to the 2011 Division II
2	Iceland	Promoted to the 2011 Division II
3	North Korea	
4	New Zealand	
5	Chinese Taipei	
6	Turkey	
7	Bulgaria	

== See also ==
- 2010 World U-17 Hockey Challenge
- 2010 Victoria Cup
