= Jan Káňa =

Jan Káňa may refer to:

- Jan Káňa (ice hockey, born 1990)
- Jan Káňa (ice hockey, born 1992)
