= Joonas Rask =

Finnish ice hockey player

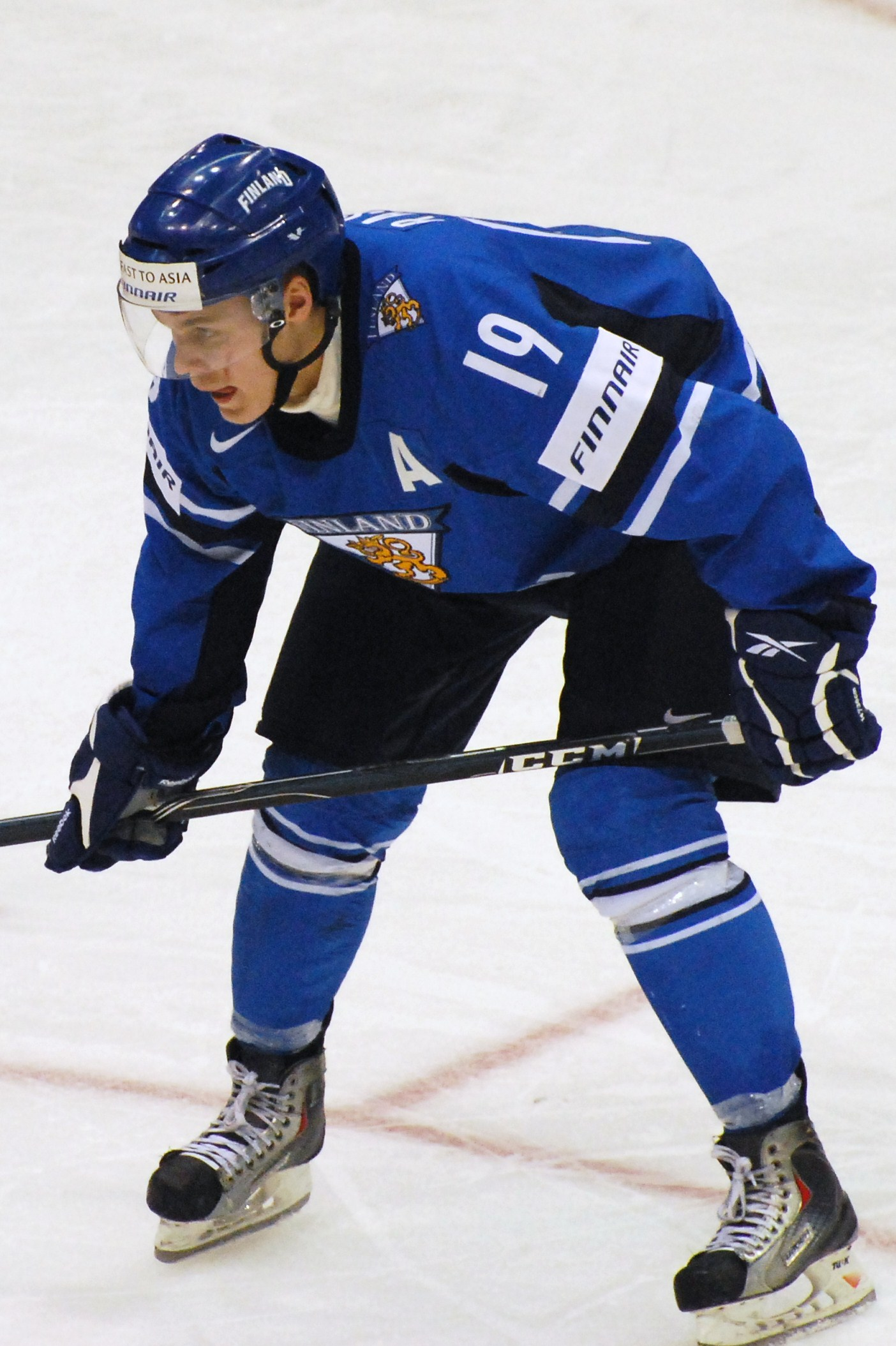
- Born: 24 March 1990 (age 36) Savonlinna, Finland
- Height: 5 ft 10 in (178 cm)
- Weight: 192 lb (87 kg; 13 st 10 lb)
- Position: Centre
- Shoots: Right
- Liiga team Former teams: Kiekko-Espoo; Ilves; Jokerit; Nashville Predators; HIFK; Örebro HK; Luleå HF
- NHL draft: 198th overall, 2010; Nashville Predators
- Playing career: 2008–present

Joonas Aleksi Rask (born 24 March 1990) is a Finnish professional ice hockey forward. He is currently playing with Kiekko-Espoo of the Liiga. He played 2 games in the National Hockey League with the Nashville Predators during the 2012–13 season. He is the younger brother of former goaltender Tuukka Rask.

== Playing career ==
Rask was selected by the Nashville Predators in the 7th round (198th overall) of the 2010 NHL entry draft.

Before coming to North America, Rask played for Ilves in the then Finnish SM-liiga. On 23 March 2012, Rask opted to sign a two-year entry-level contract with the Nashville Predators. In the following season, Rask remained in Finland as he was loaned to Jokerit by the Predators. Upon completion of the Finnish season Rask then moved to North America to end the 2012–13 season, appearing in 2 games with the Predators, contributing with an assist.

In the last year of his contract with the Predators, Rask was assigned to American Hockey League affiliate, the Milwaukee Admirals for the duration of the 2013–14 season. In a disappointing transition to North American hockey, he produced just 14 points in 58 games with the Admirals.

On 8 June 2014, Rask opted to return to Finland signing a two-year contract as a restricted free agent from the Predators with HIFK.

After five seasons in the Liiga with HIFK, Rask left following the 2018–19, signing a two-year contract with Swedish club, Örebro HK of the SHL on 20 April 2019.

Following two seasons of a second stint with HIFK, Rask was signed to a one-year contract with Kiekko-Espoo of the Liiga on 1 July 2025.

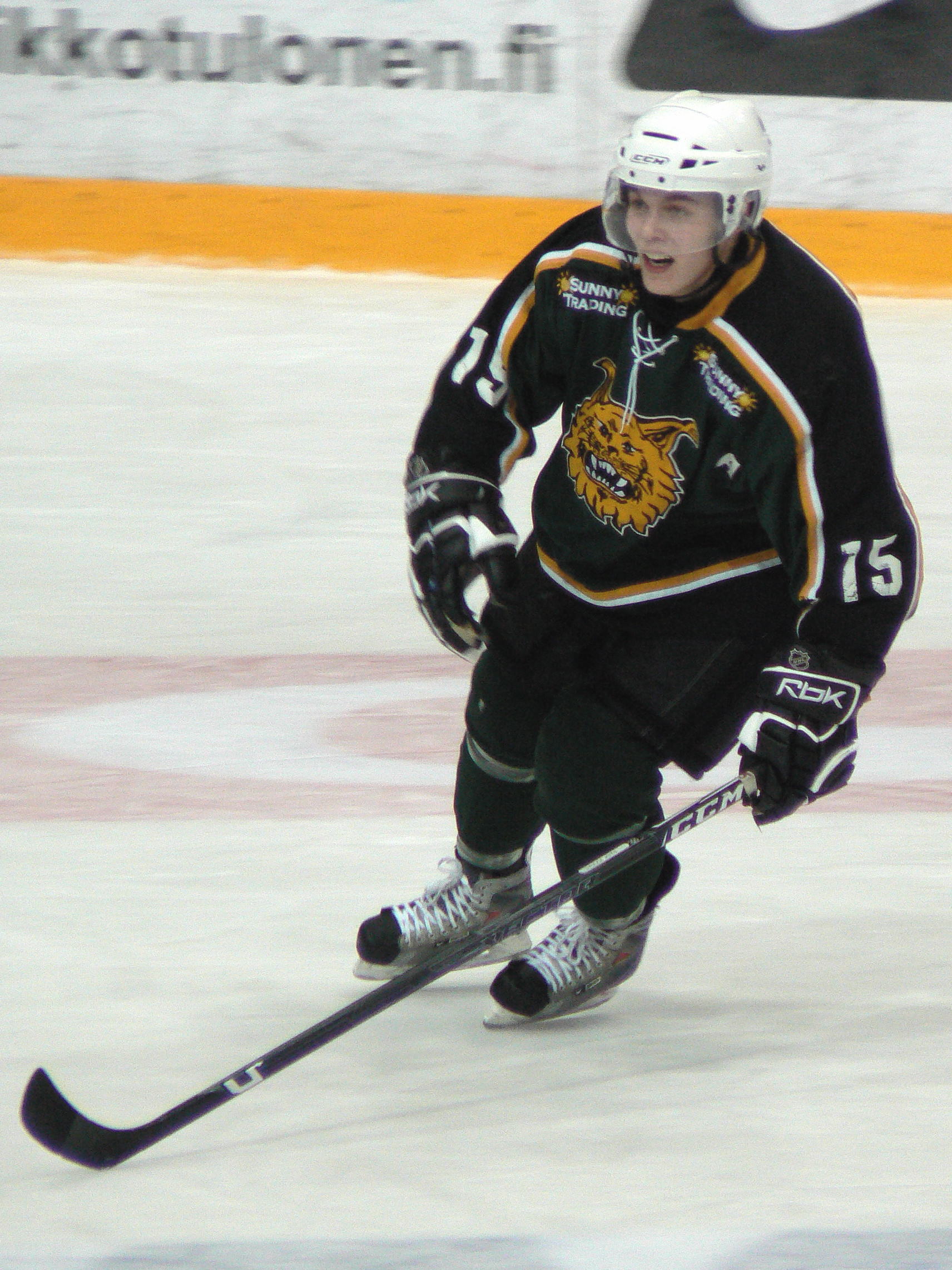
Joonas Rask playing for Ilves U20 ice hockey team in 2008.

== Career statistics ==
=== Regular season and playoffs ===
			Regular season					Playoffs
Season	Team	League	GP	G	A	Pts	PIM	GP	G	A	Pts	PIM
2005–06	SaPKo U16	FIN U16	13	23	19	42	38	—	—	—	—	—
2005–06	SaPKo U20	FIN U20	2	3	1	4	0	—	—	—	—	—
2006–07	Ilves U18	FIN U18	32	17	23	40	46	—	—	—	—	—
2006–07	Ilves U20	FIN U20	1	0	0	0	0	—	—	—	—	—
2007–08	Ilves U18	FIN U18	6	3	9	12	22	—	—	—	—	—
2007–08	Ilves U20	FIN U20	32	11	18	29	34	5	1	3	4	2
2008–09	Ilves U20	FIN U20	25	8	11	19	8	—	—	—	—	—
2008–09	Ilves	SM-l	24	1	0	1	8	3	0	1	1	0
2008–09	LeKi	Mestis	1	1	2	3	2	—	—	—	—	—
2008–09	Suomi U20	Mestis	8	0	6	6	0	—	—	—	—	—
2009–10	Ilves U20	FIN U20	2	0	0	0	2	4	2	2	4	2
2009–10	Ilves	SM-l	43	10	9	19	32	—	—	—	—	—
2009–10	Suomi U20	Mestis	1	0	0	0	0	—	—	—	—	—
2010–11	Ilves	SM-l	60	14	13	27	18	5	1	1	2	2
2011–12	Ilves	SM-l	32	4	14	18	12	—	—	—	—	—
2012–13	Jokerit	SM-l	52	5	5	10	6	2	0	0	0	0
2012–13	Nashville Predators	NHL	2	0	1	1	0	—	—	—	—	—
2012–13	Milwaukee Admirals	AHL	1	1	1	2	0	1	0	0	0	0
2013–14	Milwaukee Admirals	AHL	58	4	10	14	15	—	—	—	—	—
2014–15	HIFK	SM-I	49	11	18	29	20	8	4	2	6	6
2015–16	HIFK	SM-I	43	10	12	22	10	18	4	13	17	0
2016–17	HIFK	SM-I	33	7	14	21	8	13	4	6	10	6
2017–18	HIFK	SM-I	44	13	16	29	4	14	2	7	9	6
2018–19	HIFK	SM-I	57	20	18	34	14	8	2	3	5	2
2019–20	Örebro HK	SHL	50	6	9	15	98	—	—	—	—	—
2020–21	Örebro HK	SHL	52	9	16	25	10	9	0	3	3	0
2021–22	Luleå HF	SHL	47	4	8	12	6	16	0	4	4	2
2022–23	Luleå HF	SHL	48	5	7	12	12	10	2	1	3	2
2023–24	HIFK	Liiga	49	11	9	20	17	7	2	0	2	12
2024–25	HIFK	Liiga	46	6	6	12	8	3	0	0	0	0
Liiga totals			532	112	134	246	157	91	24	35	59	36
NHL totals			2	0	1	1	0	—	—	—	—	—
SHL totals			197	24	40	64	126	35	2	8	10	4

=== International ===
Year	Team	Event	GP	G	A	Pts	PIM
2008	Finland	U18	6	1	4	5	0
2009	Finland	WJC	6	1	3	4	0
2010	Finland	WJC	6	2	0	2	0
Junior totals			18	4	7	11	0
