= Mauro Jörg =

Swiss ice hockey player

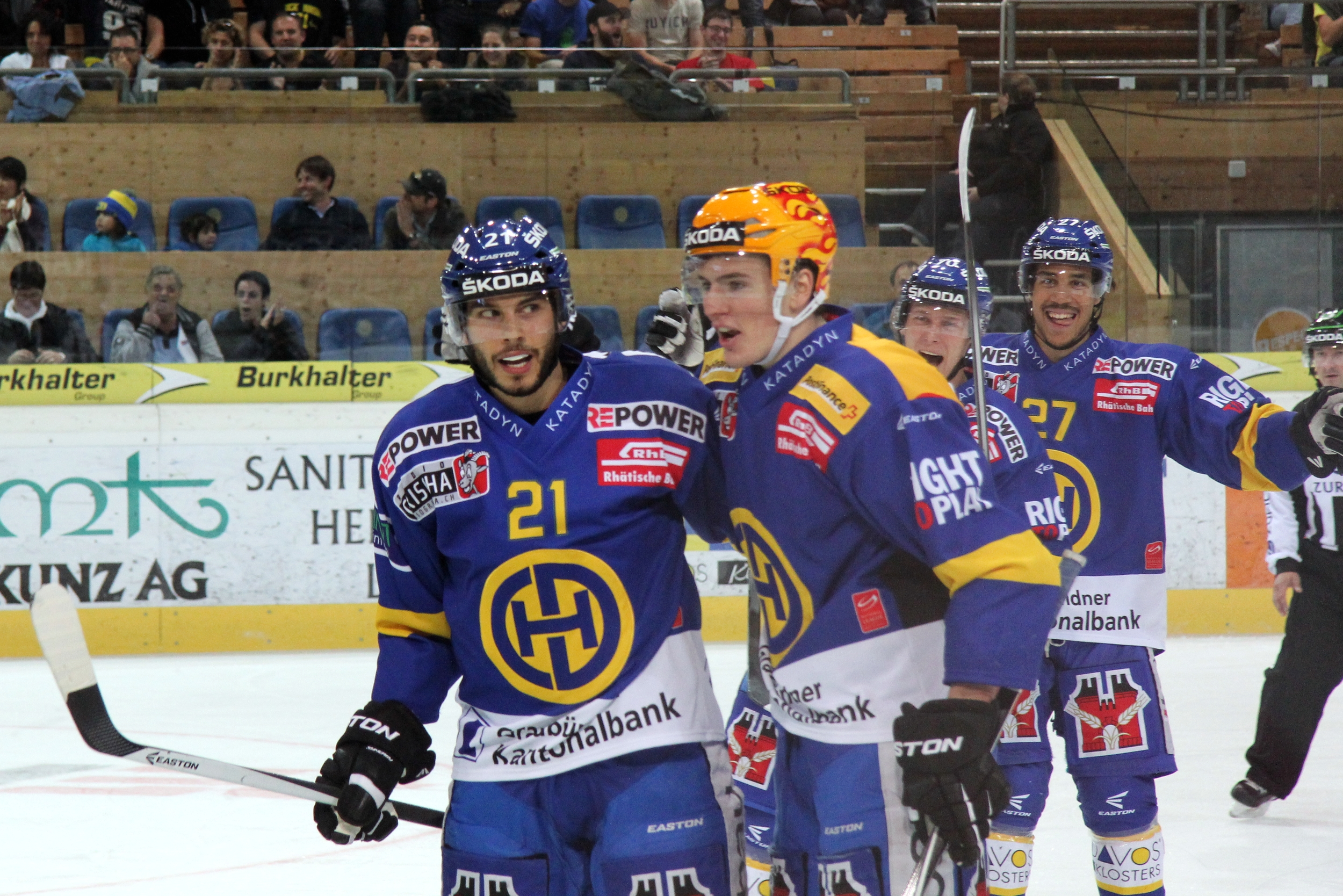
- Born: 29 April 1990 (age 36) Chur, Switzerland
- Height: 6 ft 0 in (183 cm)
- Weight: 205 lb (93 kg; 14 st 9 lb)
- Position: Left wing
- Shoots: Left
- NL team Former teams: HC Fribourg-Gottéron; HC Lugano; Rapperswil-Jona Lakers; HC Davos
- NHL draft: 204th overall, 2010; New Jersey Devils
- Playing career: 2007–present

Mauro Jörg (born 29 April 1990) is a Swiss professional ice hockey forward who is currently playing for HC Fribourg-Gottéron of the National League (NL). He was selected by the New Jersey Devils in the 7th round (204th overall) of the 2010 NHL entry draft.

== Playing career ==
Unsigned from the Devils, and after two seasons with the Rapperswil-Jona Lakers, Jörg signed for his third NL club in agreeing to a three-year contract with HC Davos on 28 May 2014.

On 3 July 2018 Jörg returned to HC Lugano on a two-year deal worth CHF 1.2 million.

On 30 May 2020 Jörg agreed to a one-year contract with Lausanne HC for the 2020/21 season. On 16 October 2020 Jörg was traded to HC Fribourg-Gottéron, without having played a single game for Lausanne, in exchange for Noah Schneeberger.

== Career statistics ==
=== Regular season and playoffs ===
| | | | Regular season | | | | | Playoffs |
| Season | Team | League | GP | G | A | Pts | PIM | GP | G | A | Pts | PIM |
|---|---|---|---|---|---|---|---|---|---|---|---|---|
| 2006–07 | EHC Chur | NLB | 20 | 1 | 1 | 2 | 0 | — | — | — | — | — |
| 2007–08 | EHC Chur | NLB | 40 | 11 | 9 | 20 | 33 | — | — | — | — | — |
| 2008–09 | HC Lugano | NLA | 47 | 3 | 3 | 6 | 6 | 7 | 0 | 0 | 0 | 0 |
| 2009–10 | HC Lugano | NLA | 44 | 1 | 7 | 8 | 6 | 4 | 0 | 0 | 0 | 0 |
| 2009–10 | EHC Visp | NLB | — | — | — | — | — | 7 | 0 | 1 | 1 | 0 |
| 2010–11 | HC Lugano | NLA | 50 | 3 | 9 | 12 | 26 | — | — | — | — | — |
| 2011–12 | HC Lugano | NLA | 48 | 4 | 3 | 7 | 8 | 6 | 0 | 2 | 2 | 0 |
| 2011–12 | HC Sierre | NLB | 2 | 3 | 1 | 4 | 2 | — | — | — | — | — |
| 2012–13 | Rapperswil-Jona Lakers | NLA | 48 | 4 | 6 | 10 | 10 | — | — | — | — | — |
| 2013–14 | Rapperswil-Jona Lakers | NLA | 49 | 5 | 10 | 15 | 2 | — | — | — | — | — |
| 2014–15 | HC Davos | NLA | 49 | 14 | 8 | 22 | 14 | 14 | 2 | 2 | 4 | 2 |
| 2015–16 | HC Davos | NLA | 47 | 11 | 18 | 29 | 4 | 9 | 2 | 1 | 3 | 0 |
| 2016–17 | HC Davos | NLA | 32 | 7 | 7 | 14 | 4 | 10 | 2 | 1 | 3 | 2 |
| 2017–18 | HC Davos | NL | 36 | 5 | 11 | 16 | 29 | 3 | 0 | 0 | 0 | 0 |
| 2018–19 | HC Lugano | NL | 50 | 5 | 10 | 15 | 10 | 4 | 0 | 0 | 0 | 0 |
| 2019–20 | HC Lugano | NL | 39 | 1 | 3 | 4 | 6 | — | — | — | — | — |
| 2020–21 | HC Fribourg-Gottéron | NL | 43 | 4 | 7 | 11 | 6 | 5 | 1 | 0 | 1 | 0 |
| 2021–22 | HC Fribourg-Gottéron | NL | 44 | 7 | 18 | 25 | 12 | 9 | 1 | 0 | 1 | 2 |
| 2022–23 | HC Fribourg-Gottéron | NL | 49 | 2 | 9 | 11 | 27 | 2 | 0 | 0 | 0 | 0 |
| NL totals | | | 675 | 76 | 129 | 205 | 178 | 99 | 11 | 11 | 22 | 16 |

=== International ===
| Year | Team | Event | Result | GP | G | A | Pts | PIM |
|---|---|---|---|---|---|---|---|---|
| 2008 | Switzerland | WJC18 | 8th | 5 | 0 | 2 | 2 | 2 |
| 2009 | Switzerland | WJC-D1 | 11th | 5 | 0 | 0 | 0 | 0 |
| 2010 | Switzerland | WJC | 4th | 7 | 3 | 1 | 4 | 4 |
| Junior totals | | | | 17 | 3 | 3 | 6 | 6 |
