= Peter Andersson (ice hockey, born 1991) =

Swedish ice hockey player (born 1991)

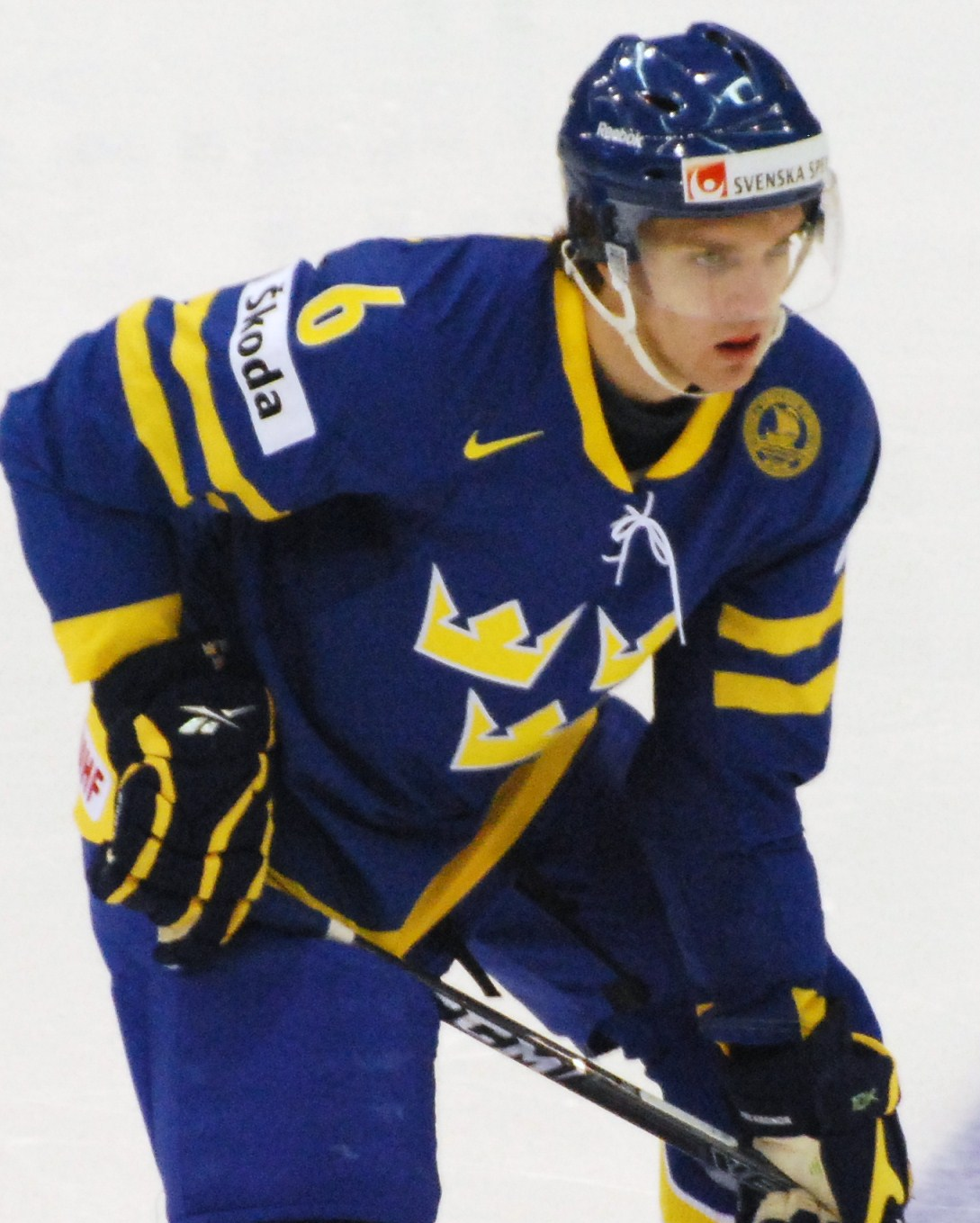
- Born: 13 April 1991 (age 35) Kvidinge, Sweden
- Height: 6 ft 3 in (191 cm)
- Weight: 194 lb (88 kg; 13 st 12 lb)
- Position: Defence
- Shoots: Left
- Liiga team Former teams: Lahti Pelicans; Frölunda HC; Örebro HK; Chicago Wolves; Utica Comets; Växjö Lakers
- NHL draft: 143rd overall, 2009; Vancouver Canucks
- Playing career: 2007–present

Karl Peter Andersson (born 13 April 1991) is a Swedish professional ice hockey defenceman, currently playing for Lahti Pelicans in the Finnish Liiga. At the 2009 NHL entry draft Andersson was drafted by the Vancouver Canucks in the fifth round, 143rd overall.

== Playing career ==
On 2 June 2010, Andersson signed an entry-level contract with the Vancouver Canucks.

During the final year of his contract with the Canucks, in the 2014–15 season while with American Hockey League affiliate, the Utica Comets, Andersson was announced to have signed a one-year contract to return to Sweden with Örebro HK on 25 March 2015. Andersson remained with the Comets for the remainder of the campaign, helping the club reach the Calder Cup finals.

After his second season in his return to the SHL with Örebro HK, Andersson was signed to a two-year contract with contending club, Växjö Lakers, on 31 May 2017.

== International play ==
Medal record

Representing Sweden

Ice hockey

World Junior Championships
Bronze medal – third place	2010 Canada	

Andersson played for Sweden at the 2010 World Junior Championships held in Saskatchewan, Canada, winning a bronze medal against Switzerland.

== Career statistics ==
=== Regular season and playoffs ===
			Regular season					Playoffs
Season	Team	League	GP	G	A	Pts	PIM	GP	G	A	Pts	PIM
2007–08	Frölunda HC	J20	8	0	2	2	4	1	0	0	0	0
2007–08	Frölunda HC	SEL	1	0	0	0	0	—	—	—	—	—
2008–09	Frölunda HC	J20	36	3	5	8	42	4	0	1	1	0
2009–10	Frölunda HC	J20	1	1	0	1	0	—	—	—	—	—
2009–10	Borås HC	Allsv	10	2	4	6	12	—	—	—	—	—
2009–10	Frölunda HC	SEL	21	1	4	5	4	—	—	—	—	—
2010–11	Frölunda HC	SEL	27	0	0	0	8	—	—	—	—	—
2011–12	Örebro HK	Allsv	30	5	1	6	18	10	2	1	3	2
2012–13	Chicago Wolves	AHL	42	1	7	8	16	—	—	—	—	—
2013–14	Utica Comets	AHL	58	2	11	13	26	—	—	—	—	—
2014–15	Utica Comets	AHL	51	2	8	10	20	17	1	7	8	12
2015–16	Örebro HK	SHL	44	2	3	5	18	—	—	—	—	—
2016–17	Örebro HK	SHL	44	2	3	5	20	—	—	—	—	—
2017–18	Växjö Lakers	SHL	40	0	5	5	14	9	0	2	2	6
2018–19	Växjö Lakers	SHL	39	2	5	7	51	7	0	2	2	0
2019–20	Växjö Lakers	SHL	9	0	2	2	8	—	—	—	—	—
2020–21	Växjö Lakers	SHL	14	0	1	1	6	—	—	—	—	—
2021–22	Växjö Lakers	SHL	36	2	3	5	45	—	—	—	—	—
SHL totals			275	9	26	35	174	16	0	4	4	6
AHL totals			151	5	26	31	62	17	1	7	8	12

=== International ===
Year	Team	Event	Result	GP	G	A	Pts	PIM
2009	Sweden	U18	5th	6	1	0	1	6
2010	Sweden	WJC	3rd place, bronze medalist(s)	6	0	3	3	4
Junior totals				12	1	3	4	10

== Awards and honours ==
Award	Year
SHL
Le Mat Trophy (Växjö Lakers)	2018, 2021
