= Teemu Eronen =

Finnish ice hockey player

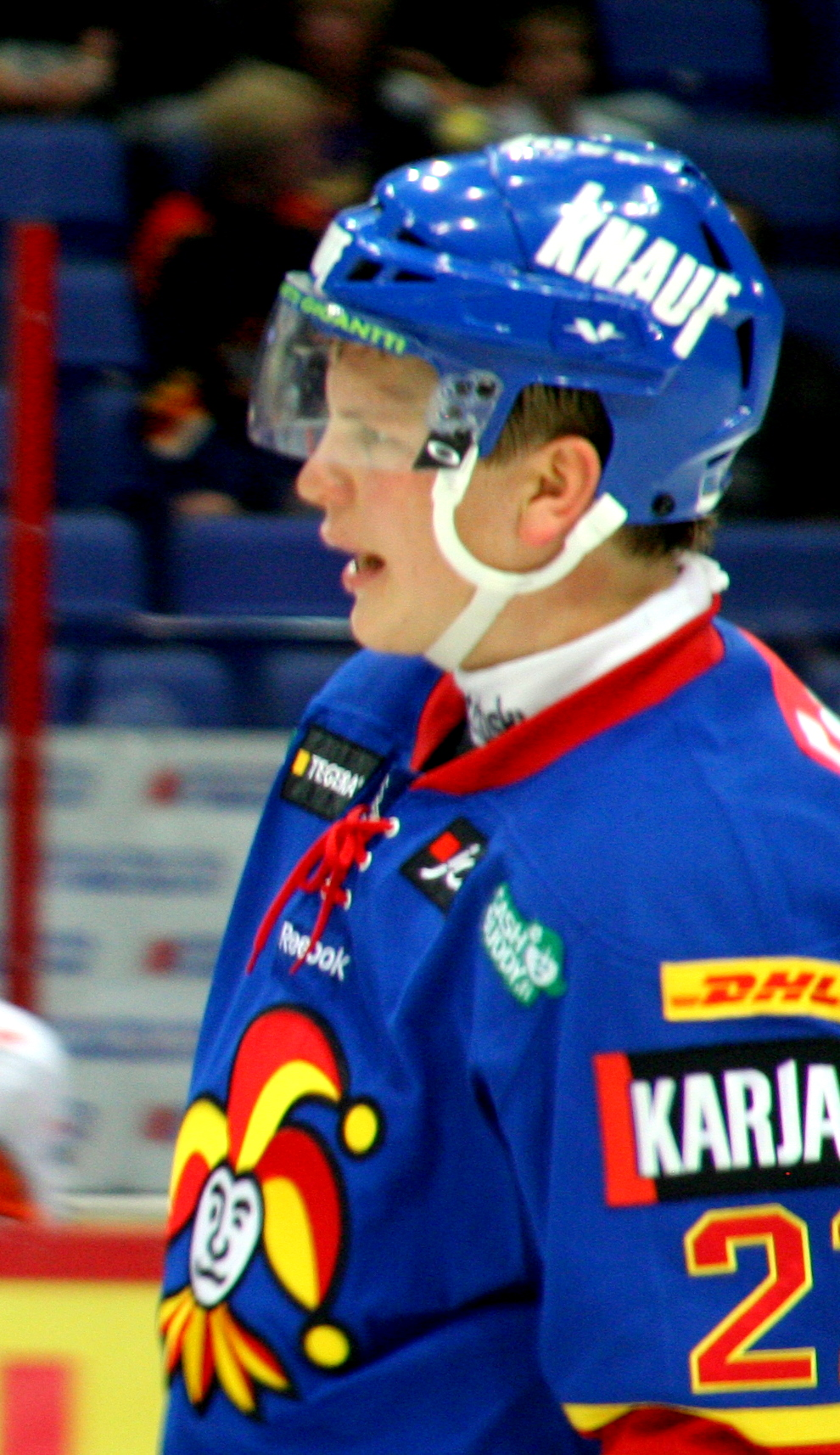
- Born: 22 November 1990 (age 35) Vantaa, Finland
- Height: 5 ft 11 in (180 cm)
- Weight: 187 lb (85 kg; 13 st 5 lb)
- Position: Defence
- Shoots: Left
- team Former teams: JYP Jyväskylä; Lahti Pelicans; Jokerit; Neftekhimik Nizhnekamsk; HC Vityaz; HIFK
- NHL draft: 192nd overall, 2011; St. Louis Blues
- Playing career: 2009–present

Teemu Eronen (born 22 November 1990) is a Finnish professional ice hockey defenceman. He is currently a player for the JYP Jyväskylä in the Finnish Liiga. He is serving as the captain of the team. He was selected by the St. Louis Blues in the 7th round (192nd overall) of the 2011 NHL entry draft.

== Playing career ==
After two seasons in the Kontinental Hockey League with HC Neftekhimik Nizhnekamsk and HC Vityaz, Eronen returned to his homeland in agreeing to a two-year contract in the Liiga with HIFK on May 27, 2016.

Eronen played three seasons with HIFK before returning to the KHL with original club, Jokerit, on 24 April 2019.

== Career statistics ==
=== Regular season and playoffs ===
			Regular season					Playoffs
Season	Team	League	GP	G	A	Pts	PIM	GP	G	A	Pts	PIM
2007–08	Jokerit	Jr. A	16	3	0	3	14	4	0	1	1	6
2008–09	Jokerit	Jr. A	41	5	22	27	18	4	0	1	1	2
2008–09	Jokerit	SM-l	1	0	0	0	0	—	—	—	—	—
2009–10	Jokerit	Jr. A	11	0	14	14	8	—	—	—	—	—
2009–10	Jokerit	SM-l	33	1	11	12	18	2	0	2	2	0
2010–11	Jokerit	SM-l	48	2	11	13	24	7	1	2	3	6
2011–12	Jokerit	SM-l	46	9	18	27	12	10	1	3	4	2
2012–13	Jokerit	SM-l	55	8	18	26	22	6	1	3	4	0
2013–14	Jokerit	Liiga	43	7	17	24	20	2	0	0	0	0
2013–14	Kiekko-Vantaa	Mestis	1	0	0	0	0	—	—	—	—	—
2014–15	Neftekhimik Nizhnekamsk	KHL	49	8	14	22	14	—	—	—	—	—
2015–16	HC Vityaz	KHL	46	4	17	21	16	—	—	—	—	—
2016–17	HIFK	Liiga	48	5	15	20	57	13	2	4	6	2
2017–18	HIFK	Liiga	26	4	11	15	14	14	3	3	6	12
2018–19	HIFK	Liiga	49	9	26	35	22	13	3	3	6	4
2019–20	Jokerit	KHL	55	3	7	10	12	—	—	—	—	—
2020-21	Vaxjo Lakers	SHL	30	2	2	4	8
2020-21	Bjorkloven	Allsvenskan	21	1	6	7	8	14	0	5	5	6
2021-22	Lahti Pelicans	Liiga	57	14	20	34	32	3	0	0	0	0
Liiga totals			349	45	127	172	189	67	11	20	31	26
KHL totals			150	15	38	53	42	—	—	—	—	—

=== International ===
Year	Team	Event	Result	GP	G	A	Pts	PIM
2008	Finland	WJC18	6th	6	0	0	0	4
2010	Finland	WJC	5th	6	1	2	3	4
Junior totals				12	1	2	3	8
