= Daniel Brodin =

Swedish ice hockey player (born 1990)

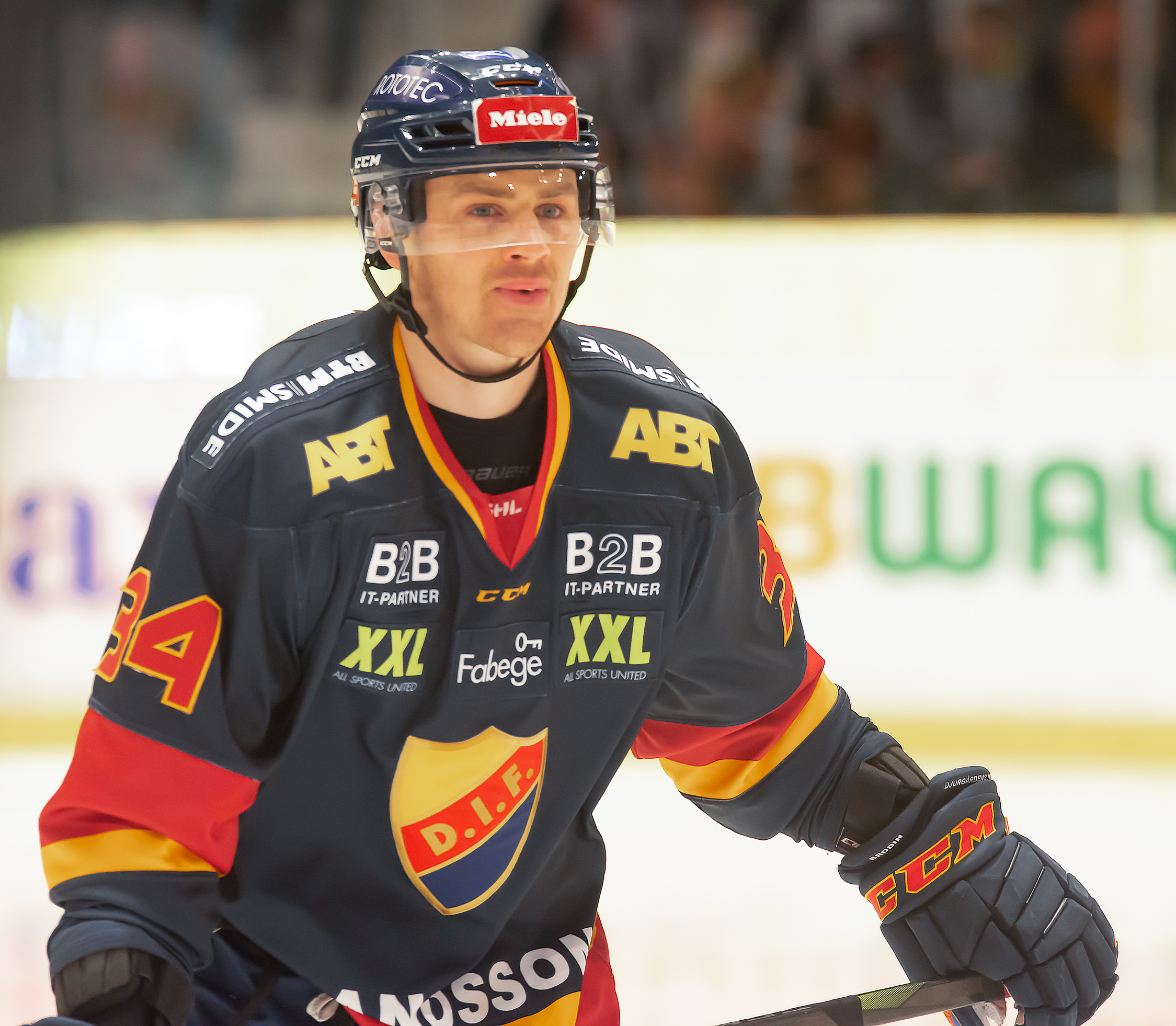
- Daniel Brodin during a home game with Djurgårdens IF against Färjestads BK in the Swedish Hockey League in January 2019
- Born: 9 February 1990 (age 36) Stockholm, Sweden
- Height: 6 ft 0 in (183 cm)
- Weight: 163 lb (74 kg; 11 st 9 lb)
- Position: Right wing
- Shoots: Right
- SHL team Former teams: Djurgårdens IF; Ässät Pori; Brynäs IF; HC Fribourg-Gottéron
- National team: Sweden
- NHL draft: 146th overall, 2010; Toronto Maple Leafs
- Playing career: 2008–present

Daniel Brodin (born 9 February 1990) is a Swedish professional ice hockey right winger who is currently playing for Djurgårdens IF Hockey in the Swedish Hockey League (SHL). Brodin has represented Sweden internationally at the 2010 World Junior Championships. He was drafted by the Toronto Maple Leafs, who selected him in the fifth round of the 2010 NHL entry draft.

== Playing career ==
Brodin participated in the 2006 TV-pucken, playing for Stockholm Röd. He scored one goal and two points but couldn't help the team get promoted to the playoffs. He played the rest of the 2006–07 season in Almtuna IS' J20 team. He moved to Djurgårdens IF the following season, where he played in Djurgården's J18 team for most of the season.

Brodin was promoted to the J20 team for the 2008–09 season. The team made it to the playoffs but was beaten by Brynäs IF in the semifinals. Brodin joined Djurgården's senior team as an extra player for the away game against Luleå HF on 12 February 2009, but did not get any time on the ice. He made his real Elitserien debut against Modo Hockey on 10 November 2009, two days later on 12 November, he scored his first point, an assist to Marcus Krüger who scored the 2–2 goal against Luleå HF. Brodin scored the 2–1 goal in the derby against Södertälje SK on 14 November 2009. It proved to be the game-winning goal and was also his first goal in Elitserien.

Brodin was selected by the Toronto Maple Leafs in the fifth round of the 2010 NHL entry draft. Brodin signed a two-year extension with Djurgården on 4 March 2011.

On 3 May 2019, Brodin joined HC Fribourg-Gottéron of the National League (NL) on a one-year deal worth CHF 650,000.

== International play ==
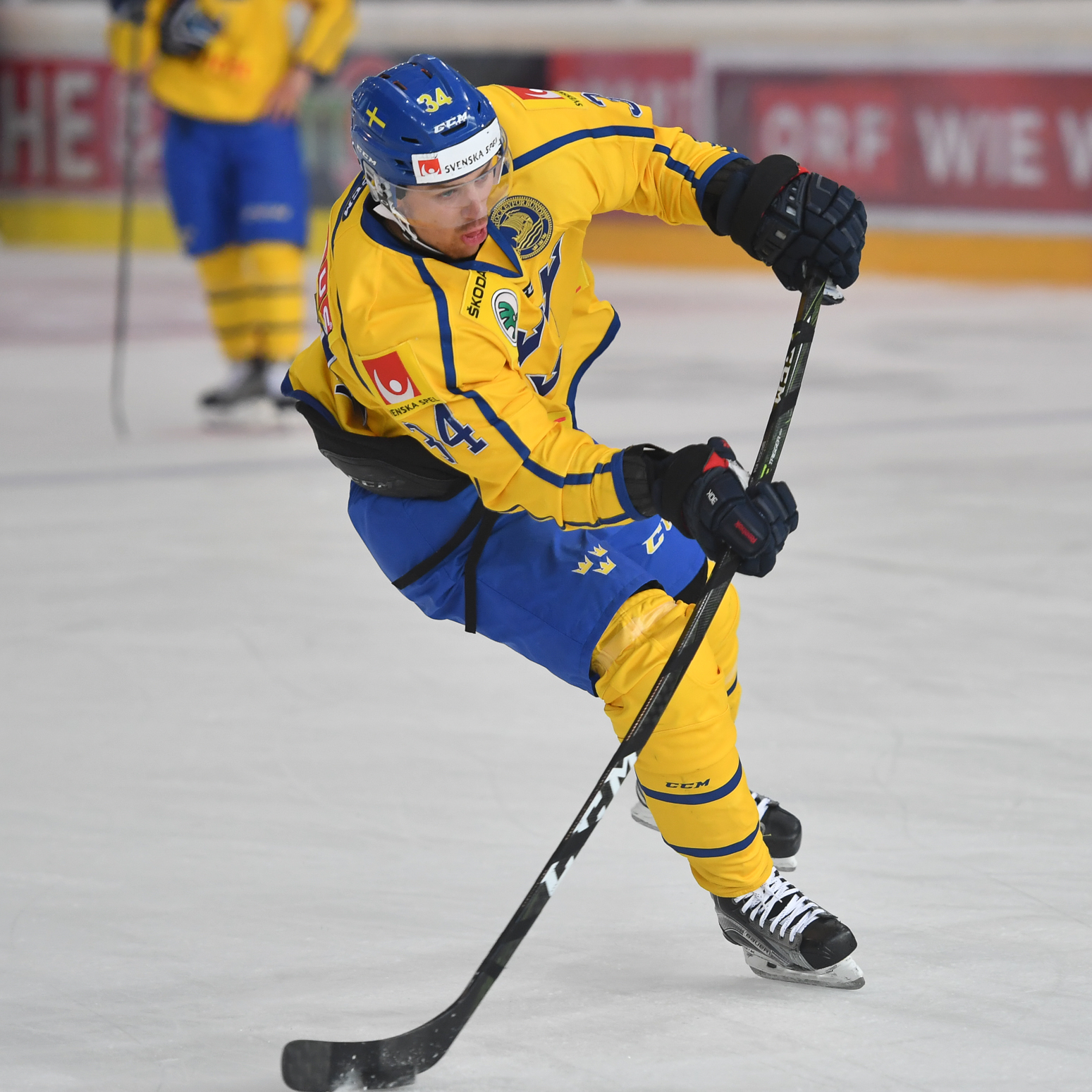

Medal record

Ice hockey

Representing Sweden

World Junior Championships
Bronze medal – third place	2010 Saskatoon	

Brodin was named for Team Sweden by Pär Mårts, coach of Sweden's national junior hockey team, for the 2010 World Junior Ice Hockey Championships, despite only having played nine Elitserien games at the time.

He replaced Niklas Nordgren, who suffered from a minor concussion, in the 2010 Karjala Cup. Team Sweden's last game in the tournament against Finland was Brodin's first game in the senior national team. He was called up again for Team Sweden for the 2010 Channel One Cup.

== Personal ==
In July 2017, Brodin married his childhood sweetheart Emilia Appelqvist, a professional soccer player for Djurgårdens IF DFF and the Sweden women's national football team. In September 2018 Emilia gave birth to the couple's first child, a daughter named Mila Ida Brodin.

== Career statistics ==
=== Regular season and playoffs ===
			Regular season					Playoffs
Season	Team	League	GP	G	A	Pts	PIM	GP	G	A	Pts	PIM
2006–07	Almtuna IS	J18	—	14	7	21	36	—	—	—	—	—
2006–07	Almtuna IS	J20	24	3	3	6	16	—	—	—	—	—
2007–08	Djurgårdens IF	J18	21	6	12	18	18	—	—	—	—	—
2007–08	Djurgårdens IF	J18 Allsv	14	3	4	7	12	4	0	0	0	0
2007–08	Djurgårdens IF	J20	2	0	0	0	0	—	—	—	—	—
2008–09	Djurgårdens IF	J20	41	11	12	23	90	6	1	1	2	8
2008–09	Djurgårdens IF	SEL	1	0	0	0	0	—	—	—	—	—
2009–10	Djurgårdens IF	J20	20	5	2	7	12	—	—	—	—	—
2009–10	Djurgårdens IF	SEL	30	2	3	5	26	16	0	0	0	2
2010–11	Djurgårdens IF	SEL	51	4	9	13	61	7	2	0	2	6
2011–12	Djurgårdens IF	SEL	46	2	5	7	28	—	—	—	—	—
2012–13	Ässät	SM-l	60	10	8	18	73	16	6	2	8	18
2013–14	Brynäs IF	SHL	52	11	4	15	42	5	1	0	1	2
2014–15	Brynäs IF	SHL	54	7	12	19	61	7	1	2	3	4
2015–16	Djurgårdens IF	SHL	50	13	11	24	42	8	3	1	4	10
2016–17	Djurgårdens IF	SHL	49	11	10	21	34	2	0	0	0	2
2017–18	Djurgårdens IF	SHL	8	1	0	1	0	11	1	0	1	0
2018–19	Djurgårdens IF	SHL	52	19	16	35	63	19	4	5	9	39
2019–20	HC Fribourg–Gottéron	NL	50	16	16	32	79	—	—	—	—	—
2020–21	HC Fribourg–Gottéron	NL	14	3	2	5	8	—	—	—	—	—
2021–22	HC Fribourg–Gottéron	NL	46	10	9	19	44	9	2	1	3	6
2022–23	Djurgårdens IF	Allsv	49	19	10	29	40	13	5	4	9	6
2023–24	Djurgårdens IF	Allsv	52	9	11	20	25	15	2	3	5	4
2024–25	Djurgårdens IF	Allsv	38	5	6	11	45	12	2	2	4	8
SHL totals			393	70	70	140	357	85	14	8	22	65

=== International ===
Year	Team	Event	Result	GP	G	A	Pts	PIM
2010	Sweden	WJC	3rd place, bronze medalist(s)	6	3	2	5	6
2022	Sweden	OG	4th	1	0	0	0	0
Junior totals				6	3	2	5	6
Junior totals				1	0	0	0	0
