= Matúš Rais =

Slovak ice hockey player

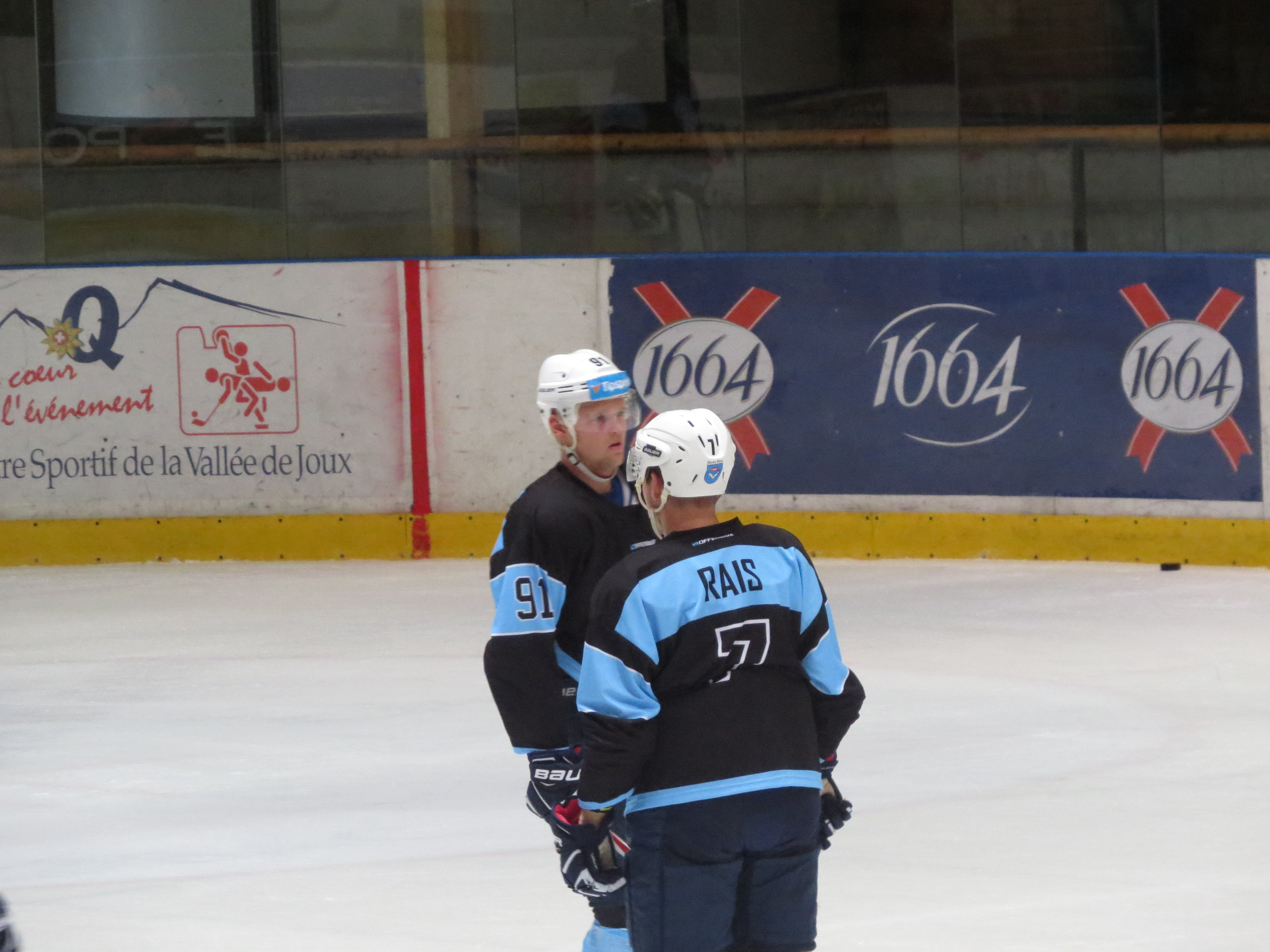
- Born: 21 November 1990 (age 35) Nitra, Czechoslovakia
- Height: 185 cm (6 ft 1 in)
- Weight: 85 kg (187 lb; 13 st 5 lb)
- Position: Defence
- Shoots: Left
- Slovak.1 team Former teams: HK Levice; HK Nitra; HK Orange 20; HC Topoľčany; ŠHK 37 Piešťany; Gentofte Stars; HC 07 Detva; HC 21 Prešov
- NHL draft: Undrafted
- Playing career: 2007–present

Matúš Rais (born 21 November 1990) is a Slovak professional ice hockey player who currently playing for HK Levice of the Slovenská hokejová liga.

Rais previously played for HC 21 Prešov, Gentofte Stars, ŠHK 37 Piešťany, and HC Topoľčany.

== Career statistics ==
=== Regular season and playoffs ===
			Regular season					Playoffs
Season	Team	League	GP	G	A	Pts	PIM	GP	G	A	Pts	PIM

=== International ===
Year	Team	Event	Result	GP	G	A	Pts	PIM
2010	Slovakia	WJC	8th	6	1	2	3	4
Junior totals				6	1	2	3	4
