= Maxim Trunev =

Russian professional ice hockey winger (born 1990)

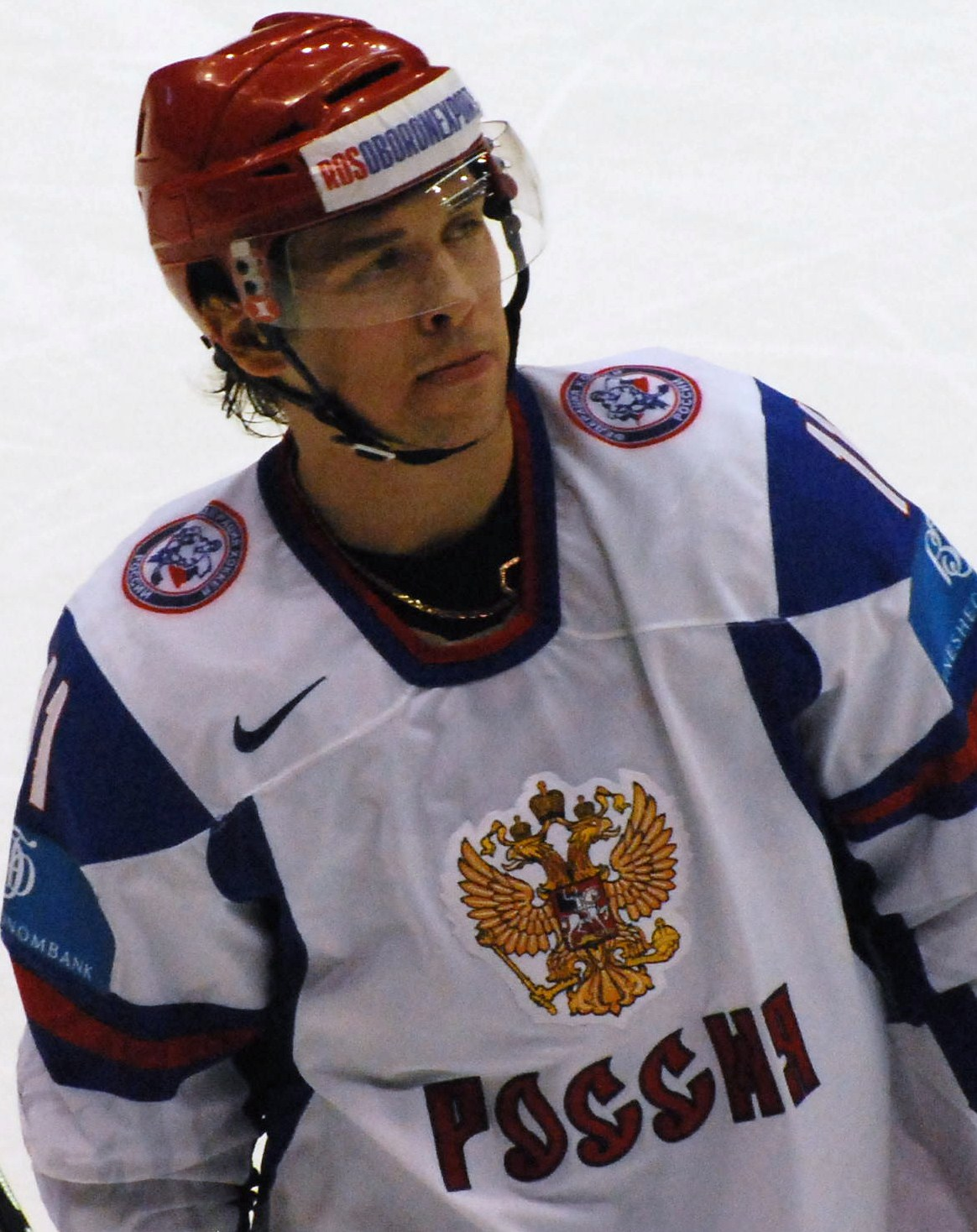
- Born: September 7, 1990 (age 35) Kirovo-Chepetsk, Russian SFSR, Soviet Union
- Height: 6 ft 0 in (183 cm)
- Weight: 198 lb (90 kg; 14 st 2 lb)
- Position: Right wing
- Shoots: Left
- Current team Former teams: Free agent Severstal Cherepovets; Lokomotiv Yaroslavl; Admiral Vladivostok; Neftekhimik Nizhnekamsk; Spartak Moscow; Traktor Chelyabinsk; Saryarka Karaganda
- NHL draft: 138th overall, 2008; Montreal Canadiens
- Playing career: 2008–present

Maxim Rudolfovich Trunev (Russian: Максим Рудольфович Трунев; born September 7, 1990) is a Russian professional ice hockey winger who is an unrestricted free agent. He was selected in the fifth round, 138th overall, by the Montreal Canadiens in the 2008 NHL entry draft.

== Playing career ==
Trunev was brought up in the Cherepovets hockey system and first came to the attention of international scouts for his play at the 2006 Mac's Midget tournament in Canada where he was voted to the first team all star. Various scouting organizations pegged him as a possible 4th or 5th round draft choice in the 2008 NHL entry draft. He was eventually selected by the Montreal Canadiens in the 5th round with the 138th overall pick (previously acquired from the Calgary Flames). Trunev was selected 3rd overall by the Portland Winter Hawks of the WHL in the 2008 CHL Import Draft. Trunev was picked up by the Tri-City Americans after Portland dropped him from its protected list.

== International play ==
Trunev played for Russia at the 2010 World Junior Championships.

== Career statistics ==
=== Regular season and playoffs ===
			Regular season					Playoffs
Season	Team	League	GP	G	A	Pts	PIM	GP	G	A	Pts	PIM
2007–08	Severstal Cherepovets	RSL	1	0	0	0	0	—	—	—	—	—
2008–09	Severstal Cherepovets	KHL	32	4	1	5	8	—	—	—	—	—
2009–10	Severstal Cherepovets	KHL	30	3	1	4	12	—	—	—	—	—
2009–10	Almaz Cherepovets	MHL	14	10	14	24	58	3	1	0	1	2
2010–11	Severstal Cherepovets	KHL	39	1	6	7	20	6	0	0	0	2
2010–11	Almaz Cherepovets	MHL	9	3	4	7	80	3	0	1	1	8
2011–12	Severstal Cherepovets	KHL	49	4	6	10	6	2	0	1	1	0
2011–12	Almaz Cherepovets	MHL	—	—	—	—	—	8	3	2	5	4
2012–13	Lokomotiv Yaroslavl	KHL	41	6	2	8	24	1	0	0	0	0
2012–13	Lokomotiv Yaroslavl-2	VHL	2	0	0	0	2	—	—	—	—	—
2013–14	Admiral Vladivostok	KHL	2	0	0	0	0	—	—	—	—	—
2013–14	Lokomotiv Yaroslavl	KHL	2	0	0	0	2	—	—	—	—	—
2013–14	Neftekhimik Nizhnekamsk	KHL	23	2	5	7	10	—	—	—	—	—
2013–14	Dizel Penza	VHL	4	1	1	2	2	—	—	—	—	—
2014–15	Neftekhimik Nizhnekamsk	KHL	17	2	2	4	12	—	—	—	—	—
2014–15	Severstal Cherepovets	KHL	29	8	4	12	6	—	—	—	—	—
2015–16	Severstal Cherepovets	KHL	33	6	4	10	20	—	—	—	—	—
2016–17	Severstal Cherepovets	KHL	58	17	12	29	28	—	—	—	—	—
2017–18	Spartak Moscow	KHL	35	7	2	9	32	4	0	0	0	0
2018–19	Spartak Moscow	KHL	36	2	9	11	8	—	—	—	—	—
2019–20	Traktor Chelyabinsk	KHL	3	0	1	1	2	—	—	—	—	—
2019–20	Severstal Cherepovets	KHL	1	0	0	0	0	—	—	—	—	—
KHL totals			430	62	55	117	200	13	0	1	1	2

=== International ===
Year	Team	Event	Result	GP	G	A	Pts	PIM
2010	Russia	WJC	6th	6	2	2	4	4
Junior totals				6	2	2	4	4

== Awards and honours ==
Award	Year
Mac's Tournament First-team All Star	2006
