= Evgeny Timkin =

Russian ice hockey player

- Born: September 3, 1990 (age 35) Murmansk, Russian SFSR, Soviet Union
- Height: 6 ft 5 in (196 cm)
- Weight: 209 lb (95 kg; 14 st 13 lb)
- Position: Right wing
- Shot: Left
- Played for: Avangard Omsk; Florida Everblades; HC Vityaz; Metallurg Magnitogorsk; SKA Saint Petersburg; Salavat Yulaev Ufa
- National team: Russia
- NHL draft: Undrafted
- Playing career: 2008–2024

Evgeny Leonidovich Timkin (Russian: Евгений Леонидович Тимкин; born September 3, 1990) is a Russian former professional ice hockey forward. He last played with Salavat Yulaev Ufa in the Kontinental Hockey League (KHL).

Timkin made his professional debut with Avangard Omsk and joined Metallurg Magnitogorsk of the KHL during the 2013–2014 season.

Following the 2023-24 season, Timkin announced his retirement from professional hockey.

== Career statistics ==
=== Regular season and playoffs ===
			Regular season					Playoffs
Season	Team	League	GP	G	A	Pts	PIM	GP	G	A	Pts	PIM
2006–07	Avangard Omsk-2	Rus.3	2	0	0	0	2	—	—	—	—	—
2007–08	Avangard Omsk-2	Rus.3	34	8	4	12	44	—	—	—	—	—
2008–09	Avangard Omsk-2	Rus.3	23	7	5	12	20	—	—	—	—	—
2008–09	Avangard Omsk	KHL	28	0	2	2	48	9	0	0	0	18
2009–10	Avangard Omsk	KHL	20	0	3	3	6	3	0	0	0	4
2009–10	Omskie Yastreby	MHL	15	4	4	8	59	4	0	2	2	4
2010–11	Florida Everblades	ECHL	35	0	7	7	38	—	—	—	—	—
2010–11	Mississippi RiverKings	CHL	3	0	0	0	2	5	2	0	2	8
2011–12	HC Vityaz	KHL	45	13	6	19	72	—	—	—	—	—
2011–12	Russkie Vityazi Chekhov	MHL	7	3	6	9	8	—	—	—	—	—
2012–13	HC Vityaz	KHL	51	12	13	25	40	—	—	—	—	—
2013–14	Metallurg Magnitogorsk	KHL	51	9	9	18	48	17	0	3	3	6
2014–15	Metallurg Magnitogorsk	KHL	55	5	5	10	64	10	0	0	0	8
2015–16	Metallurg Magnitogorsk	KHL	60	4	3	7	45	23	2	1	3	22
2016–17	Metallurg Magnitogorsk	KHL	56	8	5	13	74	18	2	3	5	10
2017–18	Metallurg Magnitogorsk	KHL	56	12	10	22	54	11	3	1	4	10
2018–19	Metallurg Magnitogorsk	KHL	55	8	5	13	32	6	0	1	1	9
2019–20	Metallurg Magnitogorsk	KHL	46	1	1	2	27	5	0	0	0	6
2020–21	SKA Saint Petersburg	KHL	45	3	5	8	45	16	2	1	3	12
2021–22	SKA Saint Petersburg	KHL	29	4	2	6	32	10	0	0	0	6
2022–23	Salavat Yulaev Ufa	KHL	48	1	4	5	30	6	0	0	0	0
2023–24	Salavat Yulaev Ufa	KHL	33	2	5	7	15	4	0	0	0	16
KHL totals			678	82	78	160	632	138	9	10	19	127

=== International ===
Year	Team	Event	Result	GP	G	A	Pts	PIM
2010	Russia	WJC	6th	6	0	1	1	18
2021	ROC	WC	5th	7	1	0	1	6
Junior totals				6	0	1	1	18
Senior totals				7	1	0	1	6

== Awards and honors ==
Award	Year
ECHL
All-Star Game	2011
KHL
Gagarin Cup (Metallurg Magnitogorsk)	2014, 2016
