= Brandon McMillan =

Canadian ice hockey player (born 1990)

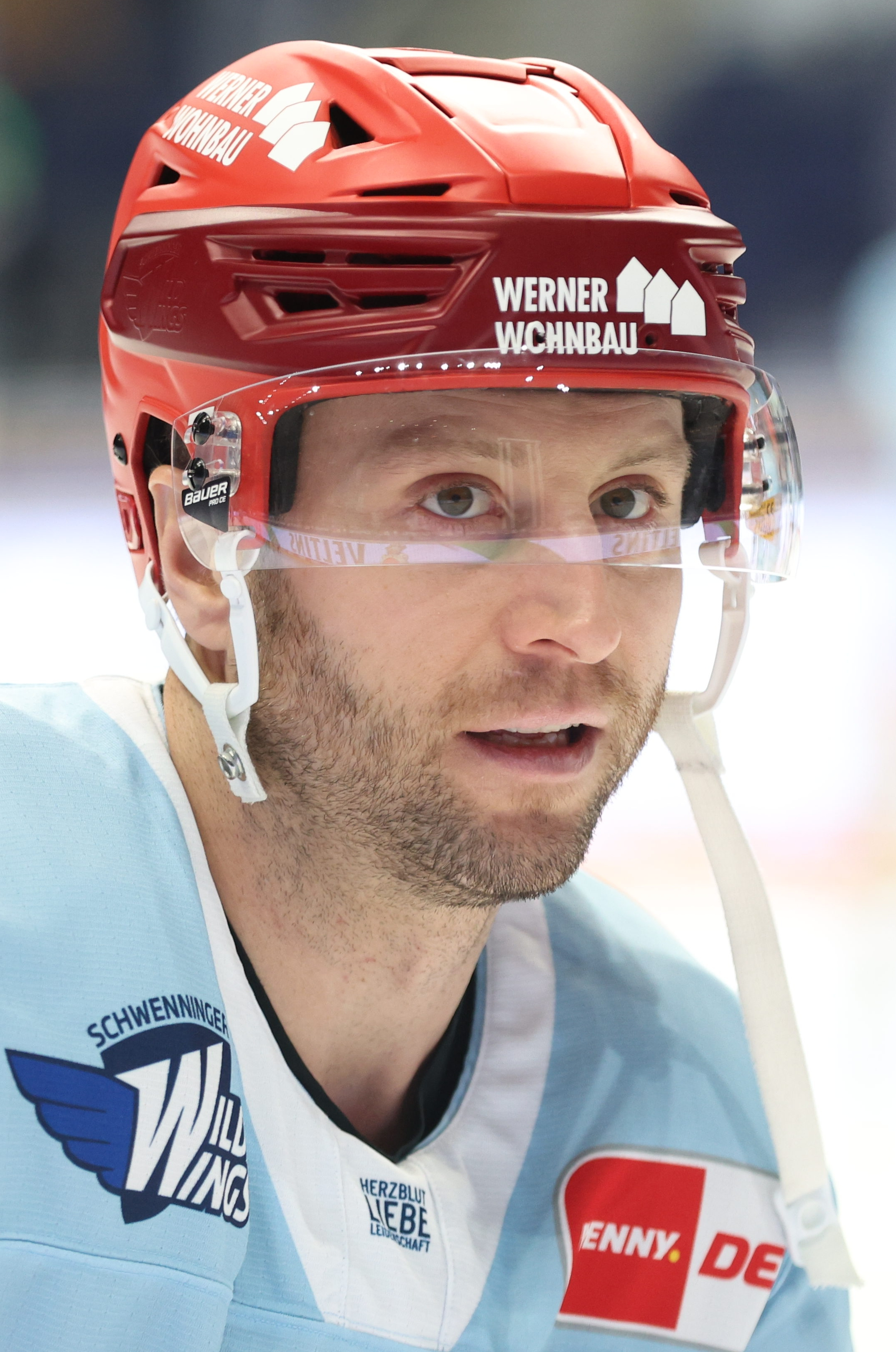
- McMillan with the Schwenninger Wild Wings in 2024
- Born: March 22, 1990 (age 36) Delta, British Columbia, Canada
- Height: 5 ft 11 in (180 cm)
- Weight: 190 lb (86 kg; 13 st 8 lb)
- Position: Left wing
- Shot: Left
- Played for: Anaheim Ducks; Arizona Coyotes; Vancouver Canucks; ERC Ingolstadt; Medveščak Zagreb; Torpedo Nizhny Novgorod; Dinamo Riga; Avangard Omsk; Neftekhimik Nizhnekamsk; HC Ambrì-Piotta; Kunlun Red Star; Schwenninger Wild Wings
- NHL draft: 85th overall, 2008; Anaheim Ducks
- Playing career: 2010–2025

Brandon McMillan (born March 22, 1990) is a Canadian former professional ice hockey player. He was selected by the Anaheim Ducks of the National Hockey League (NHL) in the third round, 85th overall, of the 2008 NHL entry draft. He is from Ladner and Tsawwassen in Delta, British Columbia.

== Playing career ==
McMillan began his major junior career with the Kelowna Rockets of the Western Hockey League in 2006–07. After a 25-goal, 67-point campaign in his fourth season with the Rockets in 2009–10, he was named to the WHL East First All-Star Team.

McMillan was selected by the Anaheim Ducks of the National Hockey League (NHL) in the third round, 85th overall, of the 2008 NHL entry draft. Turning professional for the 2010–11 season, McMillan played 16 games for Anaheim's American Hockey League (AHL) affiliate, the Syracuse Crunch, before making his NHL debut on November 21, 2010, suiting up with the Ducks for a home game loss against the visiting Edmonton Oilers.

On April 3, 2013, McMillan was dealt by the Ducks at the trade deadline to the Phoenix Coyotes in exchange for forward Matthew Lombardi.

On February 12, 2015, McMillan was claimed off waivers by the Vancouver Canucks.

MacMillan went to Europe for the 2015–16 season, playing for the German Deutsche Eishockey Liga (DEL) side ERC Ingolstadt (31 games: 13 goals, three assists). In June 2016, he inked a deal with Medvescak Zagreb of the Kontinental Hockey League (KHL). He left the Zagreb team in November 2016 and transferred to fellow KHL outfit Torpedo Nizhny Novgorod. He played out the season with Torpedo, contributing with 5 goals and 9 points in 24 games. On July 6, 2017, McMillan continued his tenure in the KHL, joining his third club in Dinamo Riga on a one-year contract. He was later traded to Avangard Omsk He became a free agent prior to signing with HC Neftekhimik Nizhnekamsk in early December 2020.

Following two seasons in the Swiss National League with HC Ambrì-Piotta, McMillan returned to the KHL in signing a contract with Chinese club, Kunlun Red Star, on October 1, 2023.

After not signing with a new team in the 2024 offseason, McMillan signed a try-out contract with the Schwenninger Wild Wings of the DEL on December 9.

== Career statistics ==
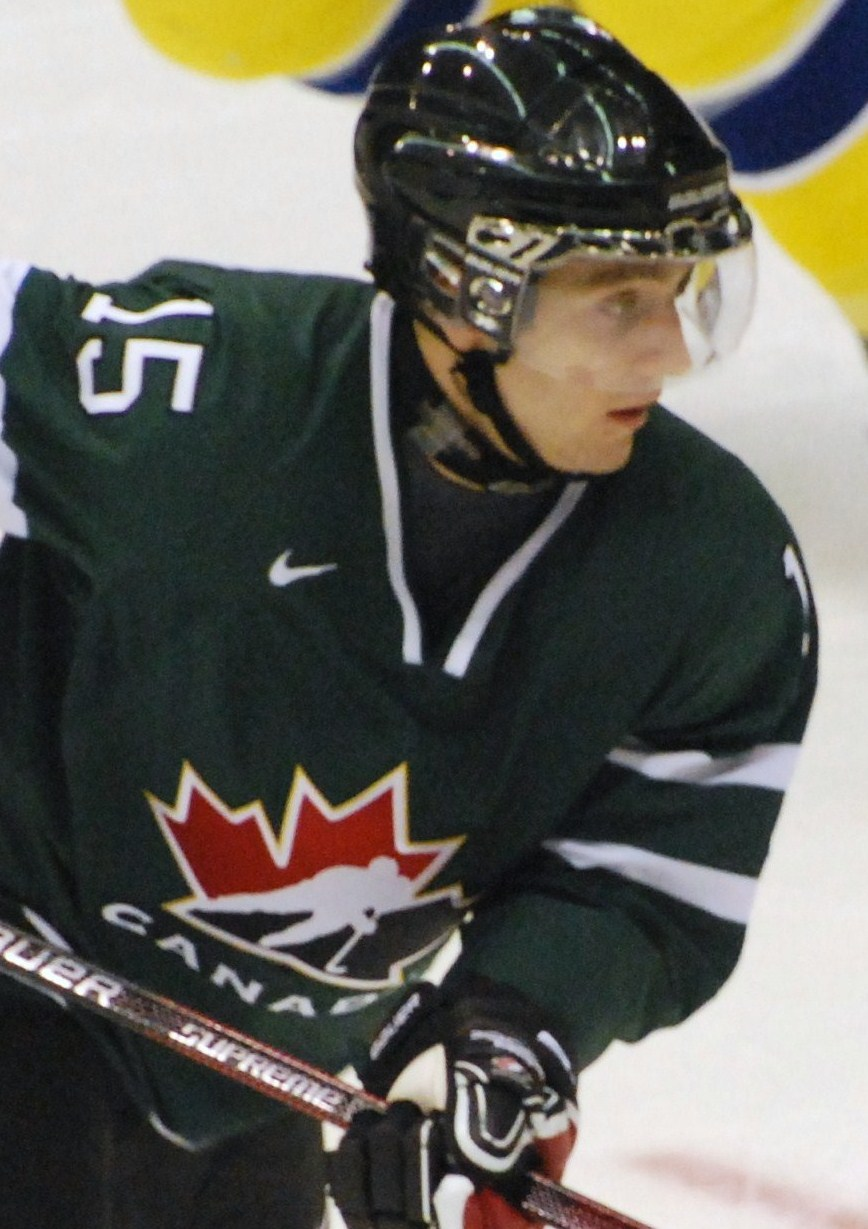

Medal record

Representing Canada

Men's ice hockey

World Junior Championship
Silver medal – second place	2010 Canada	

=== Regular season and playoffs ===
			Regular season					Playoffs
Season	Team	League	GP	G	A	Pts	PIM	GP	G	A	Pts	PIM
2006–07	Kelowna Rockets	WHL	55	2	10	12	27	—	—	—	—	—
2007–08	Kelowna Rockets	WHL	71	15	26	41	56	7	0	0	0	6
2008–09	Kelowna Rockets	WHL	70	14	35	49	75	22	0	5	5	20
2009–10	Kelowna Rockets	WHL	55	25	42	67	63	12	5	10	15	14
2010–11	Syracuse Crunch	AHL	16	4	2	6	10	—	—	—	—	—
2010–11	Anaheim Ducks	NHL	60	11	10	21	18	6	1	1	2	0
2011–12	Syracuse Crunch	AHL	55	12	18	30	36	4	1	1	2	4
2011–12	Anaheim Ducks	NHL	25	0	4	4	20	—	—	—	—	—
2012–13	Norfolk Admirals	AHL	41	8	5	13	42	—	—	—	—	—
2012–13	Anaheim Ducks	NHL	6	0	1	1	2	—	—	—	—	—
2012–13	Portland Pirates	AHL	2	0	0	0	2	3	0	0	0	6
2013–14	Portland Pirates	AHL	46	11	15	26	76	—	—	—	—	—
2013–14	Phoenix Coyotes	NHL	22	2	4	6	4	—	—	—	—	—
2014–15	Arizona Coyotes	NHL	50	1	2	3	16	—	—	—	—	—
2014–15	Vancouver Canucks	NHL	8	0	1	1	0	2	1	0	1	4
2015–16	ERC Ingolstadt	DEL	31	13	3	16	32	2	0	0	0	0
2016–17	KHL Medveščak Zagreb	KHL	31	9	6	15	24	—	—	—	—	—
2016–17	Torpedo Nizhny Novgorod	KHL	24	5	4	9	42	5	1	0	1	8
2017–18	Dinamo Riga	KHL	51	14	8	22	70	—	—	—	—	—
2018–19	Dinamo Riga	KHL	47	7	12	19	50	—	—	—	—	—
2019–20	Dinamo Riga	KHL	34	9	11	20	42	—	—	—	—	—
2019–20	Avangard Omsk	KHL	18	4	4	8	6	6	1	1	2	2
2020–21	Neftekhimik Nizhnekamsk	KHL	23	2	5	7	10	—	—	—	—	—
2021–22	HC Ambrì-Piotta	NL	45	12	9	21	41	3	2	0	2	2
2022–23	HC Ambrì-Piotta	NL	40	3	7	10	43	—	—	—	—	—
2023–24	Kunlun Red Star	KHL	43	9	11	20	45	—	—	—	—	—
2024–25	Schwenninger Wild Wings	DEL	27	3	5	8	16	3	1	0	1	0
NHL totals			171	14	22	36	60	8	2	1	3	4
KHL totals			271	59	61	120	289	11	2	1	3	10

=== International ===
Year	Team	Event	Result	GP	G	A	Pts	PIM
2008	Canada	WJC18	1st place, gold medalist(s)	7	1	2	3	6
2010	Canada	WJC	2nd place, silver medalist(s)	6	4	4	8	0
Junior totals				13	5	6	11	6

== Awards and honours ==
Award	Year
WHL
East First All-Star Team	2010
