= Anton Rödin =

Swedish ice hockey player (born 1990)

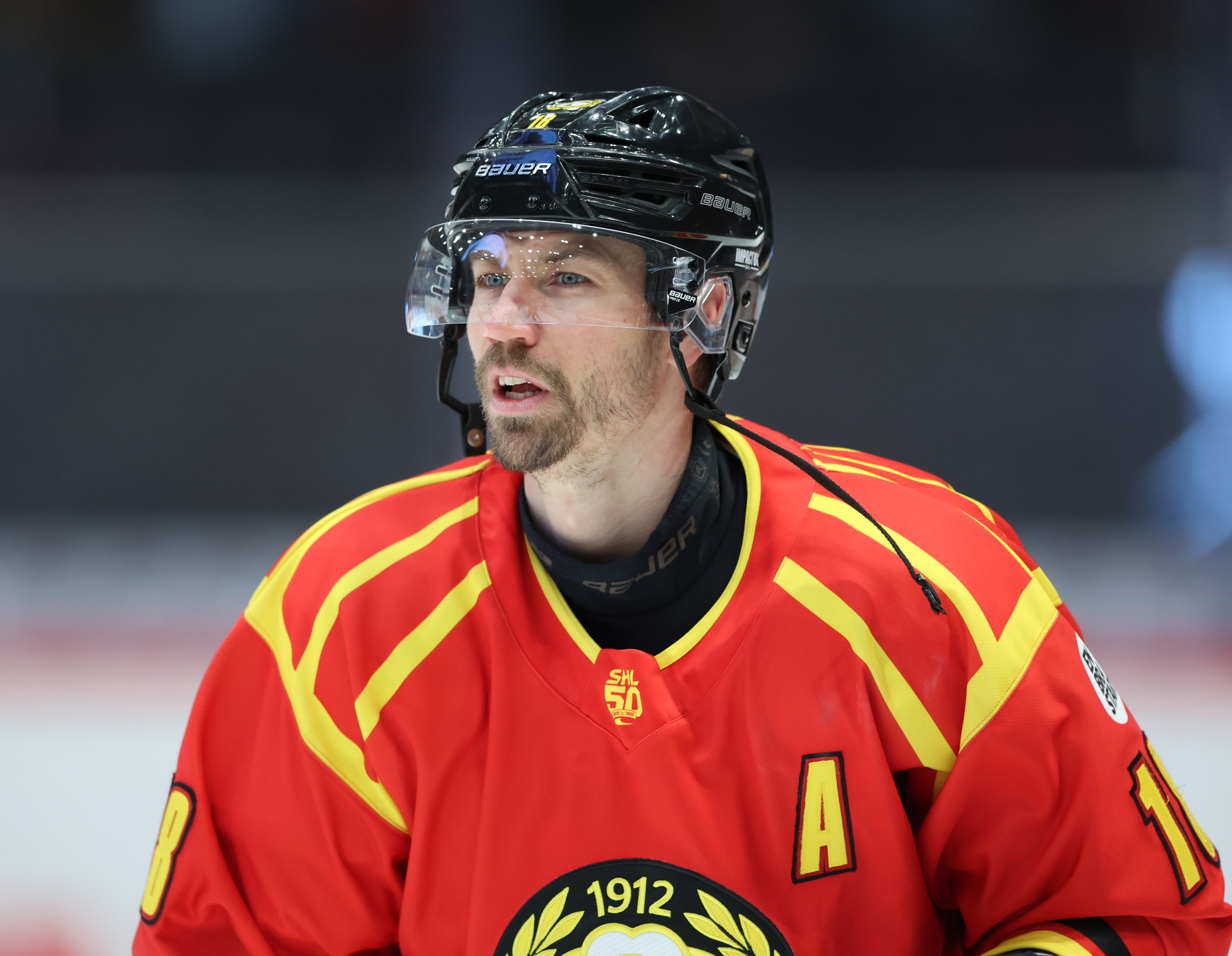
- Anton Rödin
- Born: 21 November 1990 (age 35) Stockholm, Sweden
- Height: 183 cm (6 ft 0 in)
- Weight: 84 kg (185 lb; 13 st 3 lb)
- Position: Right wing
- Shoots: Left
- SHL team Former teams: Brynäs IF; Vancouver Canucks; HC Davos
- NHL draft: 53rd overall, 2009; Vancouver Canucks
- Playing career: 2008–present

Anton Rödin (born 21 November 1990) is a Swedish professional ice hockey forward currently playing for Brynäs IF in the Swedish Hockey League (SHL). He previously played in the National Hockey League (NHL) for the Vancouver Canucks. He was selected by the Canucks in the second round, 53rd overall, of the 2009 NHL entry draft.

== Playing career ==
A native of Stockholm, Rödin played junior ice hockey with local organization Hammarby IF. During his youth, he also played regionally for Gästrikland (alongside NHL goaltender Jacob Markström) in the 2006 TV-pucken, an under-15 national tournament. That season, he joined Brynäs IF at the under-18 level, scoring 11 points (7 goals and 4 assists) over 14 games in the HockeyAllsvenskan's junior circuit. During the campaign, he also debuted in one game with Brynäs IF's J20 SuperElit team. In 2007–08, Rödin joined the J20 level full-time and recorded 19 points (8 goals and 11 assists) over 35 games. The following season, he improved to 55 points (29 goals and 26 assists) over 37 contests, ranking second in league scoring, seven behind teammate Henrik Thegel. His success earned him a six-game loan to IK Oskarshamn's men's team in Sweden's second-tier league, HockeyAllsvenskan.

During the off-season, Rödin was selected in the second round, 53rd overall, by the Vancouver Canucks in the 2009 NHL entry draft. Having been introduced to men's competition the previous season, Rödin moved on to Brynäs IF's premier team in the Swedish Elite League (SEL) in 2009–10. He scored 1 goal and 5 points over 36 games as a rookie, while also seeing time at the J20 level (three assists in four games) and with Mora IK in Allsvenskan on a loan.

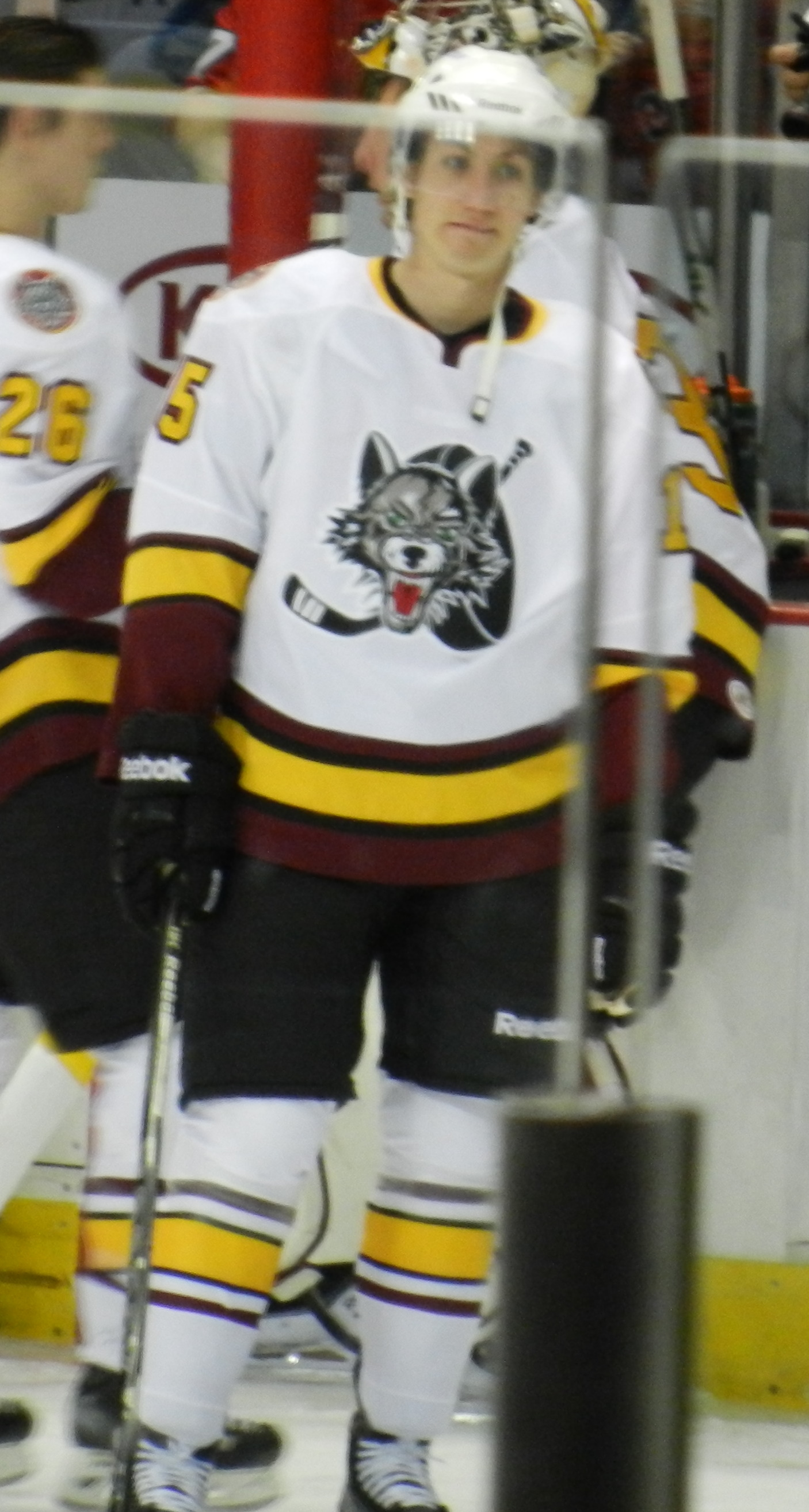
Rödin playing for the Chicago Wolves

On 1 June 2010, Rödin signed a three-year, entry-level contract with the Vancouver Canucks. After signing, the Canucks loaned Rödin to Brynäs IF for one more year. He improved to 26 points (7 goals and 19 assists) over 53 games in the SEL before leaving Sweden to begin playing within the Canucks' organization. After joining the team for training camp and pre-season action in September 2011, he was assigned to the Canucks' minor league affiliate, the Chicago Wolves of the American Hockey League (AHL).

After two years with Chicago, Rödin's contract was not renewed by the Canucks, making him a free agent. He decided to return to Sweden and signed a two-year contract with Brynäs IF. Rödin scored 12 goals and 35 points in 47 games in 2013–14 with the club and recorded 19 goals and 21 assists (54 games) the following season (plus five goals and two assists in seven playoff contests). He signed a new three-year deal with Brynäs in March 2015.

In the 2015–16 season, Rödin tallied 16 goals and 21 assists in 33 SHL contests while receiving the Gold Helmet Award as MVP of the Swedish Hockey League (SHL). He achieved this despite playing a shortened season due to a knee injury he suffered in practice in January 2016.

On 22 March 2016, Rödin was re-signed by the Vancouver Canucks for the 2016–17 NHL season. He played well during the Canucks training camp, scoring five points in five pre-season games, and it appeared he would earn a spot on the Canucks' opening roster. However, he re-aggravated his knee injury near the end of the pre-season and was placed on injured reserve. On 11 December 2016, Rödin was assigned to the Canucks' AHL affiliate, the Utica Comets, for conditioning. He was recalled on 22 December after three games and made his NHL debut the following night in a 4–1 loss to the Calgary Flames. On 2 January 2017, he scored his first NHL point, earning an assist on a Bo Horvat goal in a 3–2 victory over the Colorado Avalanche. During his third game with the Canucks, Rödin fell on his troublesome knee against Calgary on 6 January. With the reoccurrence in swelling, Rödin had season-ending surgery on 7 February.

In the following 2017–18 season, Rödin was assigned to begin the year with the Utica Comets in an attempt to return from his injury. He recorded just one goal and two points in seven games over the opening months of the campaign before he was placed on unconditional waivers and opted for a mutual termination from the remainder of his contract with the Canucks on 20 November 2017.

As a free agent, Rödin returned to Europe, agreeing to a two-year contract with HC Davos of the Swiss National League (NL) on 21 November 2017. After returning to health, he appeared in 8 regular season games providing 6 points before leading the club in the post-season with 7 points in just 6 games.

On 1 July 2018, Rödin secured a release from his NL contract in securing a one-year contract with the Anaheim Ducks of the NHL, marking his third attempt to play in the league. After attending the Ducks' 2018 training camp and preseason, Rödin failed to make the squad and with no intention to report to the AHL, he was subsequently placed on unconditional waivers, to facilitate a mutual termination of his contract. On 6 October 2018, Rödin rejoined the previous Swiss club, HC Davos, for the duration of the 2018–19 season.

In the off-season, Rödin as a free agent from Davos, opted to return home to the original club Brynäs IF of the SHL, on a long-term five-year contract on 25 April 2019.

== Personal ==
He is married to Kristin Sundberg, a famous Instagram influencer. In 2019, they welcomed their daughter, Noomi.

== Career statistics ==
=== Regular season and playoffs ===
			Regular season					Playoffs
Season	Team	League	GP	G	A	Pts	PIM	GP	G	A	Pts	PIM
2006–07	Brynäs IF	J18 Allsv	14	7	4	11	4	3	0	0	0	2
2006–07	Brynäs IF	J20	1	0	0	0	0	—	—	—	—	—
2007–08	Brynäs IF	J18 Allsv	6	2	7	9	8	5	2	5	7	0
2007–08	Brynäs IF	J20	35	8	11	19	36	7	1	0	1	0
2008–09	Brynäs IF	J20	37	29	26	55	34	7	2	10	12	4
2008–09	IK Oskarshamn	Allsv	6	0	0	0	2	—	—	—	—	—
2009–10	Brynäs IF	J20	4	0	3	3	4	3	0	3	3	0
2009–10	Brynäs IF	SEL	36	1	4	5	8	5	1	0	1	4
2009–10	Mora IK	Allsv	8	2	2	4	0	—	—	—	—	—
2010–11	Brynäs IF	SEL	53	7	19	26	16	5	1	1	2	0
2011–12	Chicago Wolves	AHL	62	10	17	27	18	—	—	—	—	—
2012–13	Chicago Wolves	AHL	49	4	10	14	22	—	—	—	—	—
2013–14	Brynäs IF	SHL	47	12	23	35	38	5	2	1	3	6
2014–15	Brynäs IF	SHL	54	19	21	40	32	7	5	2	7	6
2015–16	Brynäs IF	SHL	33	16	21	37	18	—	—	—	—	—
2016–17	Utica Comets	AHL	3	0	1	1	0	—	—	—	—	—
2016–17	Vancouver Canucks	NHL	3	0	1	1	0	—	—	—	—	—
2017–18	Utica Comets	AHL	7	1	1	2	6	—	—	—	—	—
2017–18	HC Davos	NL	8	1	5	6	6	6	3	4	7	12
2018–19	HC Davos	NL	34	11	6	17	40	—	—	—	—	—
2019–20	Brynäs IF	SHL	46	14	32	46	73	—	—	—	—	—
2020–21	Brynäs IF	SHL	35	9	20	29	18	—	—	—	—	—
2021–22	Brynäs IF	SHL	52	19	15	34	22	3	1	0	1	0
2022–23	Brynäs IF	SHL	40	6	22	28	28	—	—	—	—	—
2023–24	Brynäs IF	Allsv	47	20	23	43	30	13	4	7	11	6
2024–25	Brynäs IF	SHL	51	13	24	37	34	17	3	12	15	14
SHL totals			447	116	201	317	287	42	13	16	29	30
NHL totals			3	0	1	1	0	—	—	—	—	—

Medal record

Representing Sweden

Ice hockey

World Junior Championships
Bronze medal – third place	2010 Canada	

=== International ===
Year	Team	Event	Result	GP	G	A	Pts	PIM
2010	Sweden	WJC	3rd place, bronze medalist(s)	6	3	7	10	2
Junior totals				6	3	7	10	2
