= Andreas Kristler =

Austrian ice hockey player

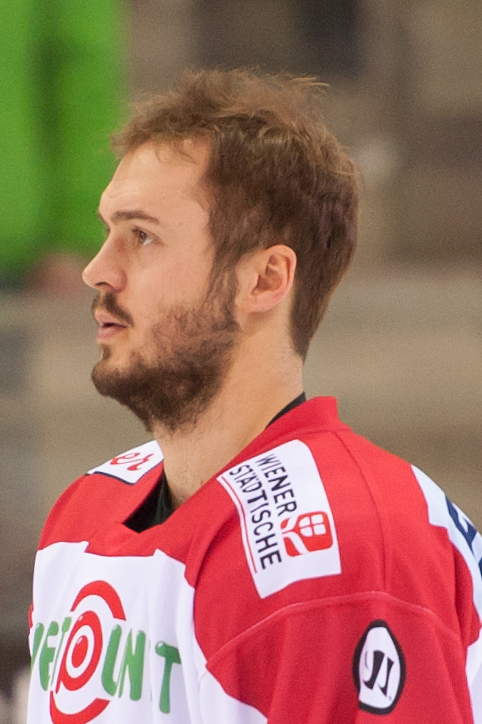
- Born: August 30, 1990 (age 34); Lienz, Austria
- Height: 5 ft 11 in (180 cm)
- Weight: 172 lb (78 kg; 12 st 4 lb)
- Position: Forward
- Shoots: Left
- ICEHL team Former teams: Black Wings Linz; EC VSV; EC Red Bull Salzburg
- National team: Austria
- Playing career: 2007–present

Andreas Kristler (born August 30, 1990) is an Austrian professional ice hockey forward who is currently playing for Black Wings Linz of the ICE Hockey League (ICEHL).

Kristler competed in the 2013 IIHF World Championship as a member of the Austria men's national ice hockey team.
