= David Ostřížek =

Czech ice hockey player

- Born: October 1, 1990 (age 34); Frýdek-Místek, Czechoslovakia
- Height: 6 ft 3 in (191 cm)
- Weight: 187 lb (85 kg; 13 st 5 lb)
- Position: Forward
- Shoots: Left
- Czech Extraliga team: HC Oceláři Třinec
- Playing career: 2009–present

David Ostřížek (born October 1, 1990) is a Czech professional ice hockey player. He played with HC Oceláři Třinec in the Czech Extraliga during the 2010–11 Czech Extraliga season.
