= Jakub Sedláček (ice hockey) =

Czech ice hockey player (born 1990)

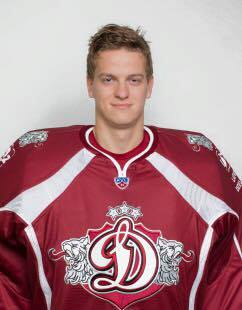
- Jakub Sedláček
- Born: 5 April 1990 (age 35) Zlín, Czechoslovakia
- Height: 5 ft 9 in (175 cm)
- Weight: 172 lb (78 kg; 12 st 4 lb)
- Position: Goaltender
- Catches: Left
- Czech team Former teams: HC Olomouc; PSG Berani Zlín; HC ZUBR Přerov; Dinamo Riga; Mountfield HK; HC Bolzano; HC Slovan Bratislava; HC Sparta Praha; HC Košice; Villacher SV; HC Kometa Brno; HC '05 Banská Bystrica
- Playing career: 2008–present

Jakub Sedláček (born 5 April 1990) is a Czech professional ice hockey goaltender who currently playing for HC Olomouc of the Czech Extraliga.

== Career ==
He previously played with Zlín through (2007–2013) and HK Hradec Králové (shortly, at the beginning of the 2017–2018 season) in the Czech Extraliga. He also played four years with the Dinamo Riga of Kontinental Hockey League (2013–2017) and briefly in 2017 with HC Bolzano of the EBEL before returning to the KHL with HC Slovan Bratislava on December 12, 2017.
