= Radoslav Illo =

Slovak ice hockey player (born 1990)

- Born: January 21, 1990 (age 36) Považská Bystrica, Czechoslovakia
- Height: 6 ft 0 in (183 cm)
- Weight: 190 lb (86 kg; 13 st 8 lb)
- Position: Centre
- Shot: Left
- Played for: Norfolk Admirals; MHC Martin; PSG Berani Zlín; AZ Havířov; HC ZUBR Přerov
- NHL draft: 136th overall, 2009; Anaheim Ducks
- Playing career: 2014–2018

Radoslav Illo (born January 21, 1990) is a Slovak former professional ice hockey player.

== Playing career ==
Illo moved to USA as 16 years old played 2 seasons with TRIC-CITY STORM (USHL), top scorer, second-year nominated to USHL ALL-STAR team. Played in WORLD JUNIORS CHAMPIONSHIP in 2009 Canada Saskatchewan. Illo's next sign was Bemidji State University NCAA D.1, playing for 4 years. Illo was selected 136th overall by the Anaheim Ducks in the 2009 NHL entry draft from the Tri-City Storm in the United States Hockey League. In 2010, Illo enrolled to Bemidji State University and stayed for five years before signing for the Norfolk Admirals of the American Hockey League for the conclusion of the 2013-14 AHL season, playing three regular-season games and one playoff game.

Illo returned to Europe, Slovakia for the 2014–15 and signed with MHC Martin of the Slovak Tipsport Liga before returning to North America in 2015. He had signed with the Jacksonville IceMen on September 8, 2015, but never played for the team and a month later he was traded to the Tulsa Oilers. Illo signed with Tulsa Oilers but only got the chance to play twice before he was traded to Norfolk Admirals, a different entity from the team he had played for in the AHL (ANAHEIM DUCKS AFFILIATION) two seasons prior. He stayed with the Admirals for almost three months and played seventeen games for the team before he was required by Idaho Steelheads. In 2016, Illo signed for the Missouri Mavericks and had his most productive season in his professional career, scoring twelve goals and twenty-seven points in fifty-three games.

Illo had a try-out with PSG Berani Zlín of the Czech Extraliga on July 24, 2017, and signed a contract with the team one month later. He played thirty-one games for Zlín that season. He had a try-out with the Kansas City Mavericks in October 2018 signed a contract and released few days later. Illo as a 28 years old retired from professional sports and now he has his own hockey school and works in Sales at Fundraising University.
