= Raimonds Vilkoits =

Latvian ice hockey player

- Born: April 10, 1990 (age 36) Riga, Latvian SSR, Soviet Union
- Height: 6 ft 3 in (191 cm)
- Weight: 212 lb (96 kg; 15 st 2 lb)
- Position: Center
- Shoots: Left
- KHL team (P) Cur. team Former teams: Dinamo Riga; HK Metalurgs Liepaja (BOL); SK Riga 18; HK Riga 2000; Dinamo-Juniors Riga; HK Riga; IF Troja/Ljungby
- National team: Latvia
- Playing career: 2007–present

Raimonds Vilkoits (born 10 April 1990) is a Latvian professional ice-hockey player, who currently plays for HK Metalurgs Liepaja of the Belarusian Extraleague.

During 2010–11 Vilkoits also played three games for Dinamo Riga of the Kontinental Hockey League.

== Career statistics ==
| | | | Regular season | | | | | Playoffs |
| Season | Team | League | GP | G | A | Pts | PIM | GP | G | A | Pts | PIM |
|---|---|---|---|---|---|---|---|---|---|---|---|---|
| 2008–09 | HK Riga 2000 | Belarus | 30 | 3 | 6 | 9 | 14 | — | — | — | — | — |
| 2009–10 | Dinamo-Juniors Riga | Belarus | 41 | 8 | 16 | 24 | 22 | — | — | — | — | — |
| 2010–11 | Dinamo Riga | KHL | 3 | 1 | 0 | 0 | 2 | — | — | — | — | — |
| 2010–11 | HK Rīga | MHL | 56 | 25 | 23 | 48 | 34 | 3 | 2 | 0 | 2 | 2 |
| 2011–12 | IF Troja/Ljungby | Allsvenskan | 11 | 1 | 3 | 4 | 6 | — | — | — | — | — |
| KHL totals | | | 3 | 1 | 0 | 0 | 2 | — | — | — | — | — |
