= Tomáš Knotek =

Czech ice hockey player

- Born: January 13, 1990 (age 36) Kladno, Czechoslovakia
- Height: 6 ft 1 in (185 cm)
- Weight: 181 lb (82 kg; 12 st 13 lb)
- Position: Forward
- Shoots: Left
- Czech Extraliga team: Mountfield HK
- Playing career: 2010–present

Tomáš Knotek (born January 13, 1990) is a Czech professional ice hockey player. He played with HC Kladno in the Czech Extraliga during the 2010–11 Czech Extraliga season.
