= Vladimír Roth =

Czech ice hockey player

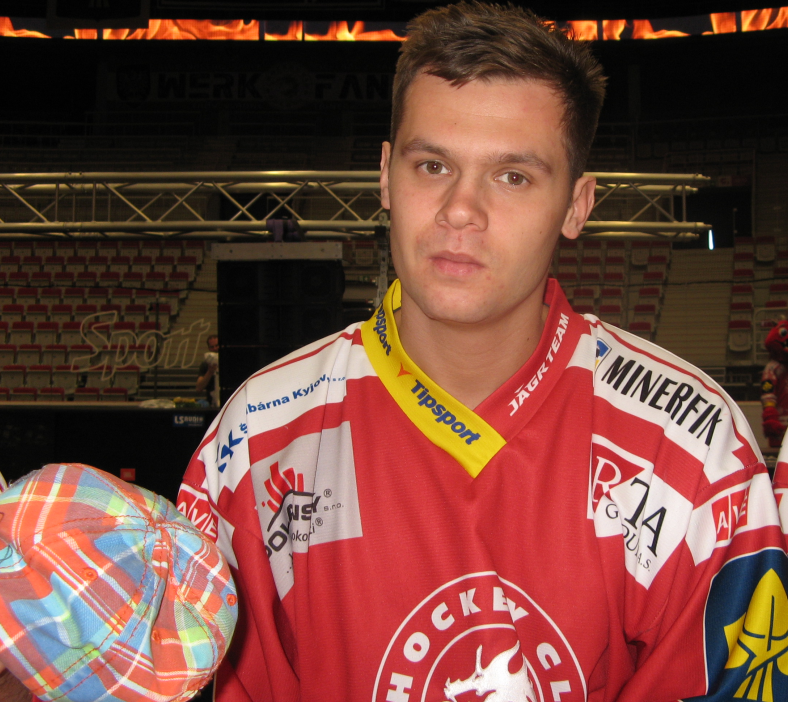
- Valadimír Roth after the end of the 2014/15 season in the Werk Arena
- Born: 25 June 1990 (age 34); Prague, Czechoslovakia
- Height: 6 ft 2 in (188 cm)
- Weight: 207 lb (94 kg; 14 st 11 lb)
- Position: Defence
- Shoots: Right
- Czech team Former teams: HC Kometa Brno; HC Slavia Praha; London Knights; BK Havlíčkův Brod; HC Bílí Tygři Liberec; HC Oceláři Třinec; HC Sibir Novosibirsk; Motor České Budějovice; HC Frýdek-Místek; Lausanne HC
- Playing career: 2007–present

Vladimír Roth (born 25 June 1990) is a Czech professional ice hockey defenceman who is currently playing for HC Kometa Brno in the Czech Extraliga (ELH).

Roth played previously for London Knights.

== Career statistics ==
=== Regular season and playoffs ===
			Regular season					Playoffs
Season	Team	League	GP	G	A	Pts	PIM	GP	G	A	Pts	PIM

=== International ===
Year	Team	Event	Result	GP	G	A	Pts	PIM
