= Jan Káňa (ice hockey, born 1992) =

Czech ice hockey player

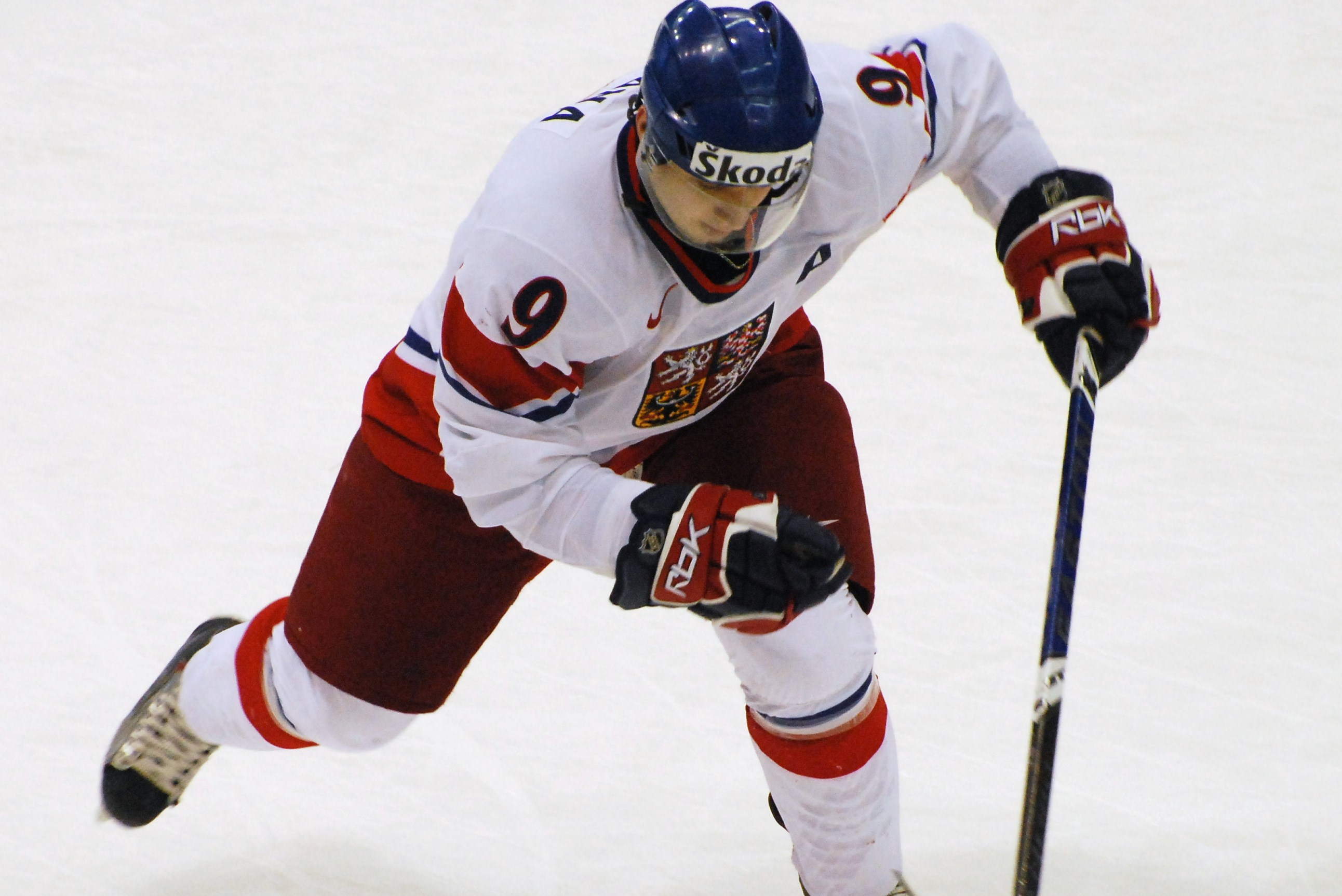
- Born: January 4, 1992 (age 33); Zlín, Czechoslovakia
- Height: 5 ft 10 in (178 cm)
- Weight: 187 lb (85 kg; 13 st 5 lb)
- Position: Forward
- Shoots: Left
- ELH team Former teams: HC Vítkovice; HC Kometa Brno; HC Olomouc
- Playing career: 2011–present

Jan Káňa (born January 4, 1992) is a Czech professional ice hockey player. He is currently playing for HC Olomouc of the Czech Extraliga (ELH). In season 2022/2023 He starts in HC Vítkovice Ridera.

Káňa made his Czech Extraliga debut playing with HC Kometa Brno during the 2011–12 Czech Extraliga season.

Following six seasons with HC Olomouc, Káňa opted to continue his career in the Extraliga in joining his third club, HC Vítkovice Ridera, on two-year contract on 2 May 2023.
