= List of Dinamo Riga players =

This is a complete list of players who have played for Dinamo Riga of the Kontinental Hockey League.

== A ==
- Jānis Andersons
- Ģirts Ankipāns
- Tyler Arnason
- Uģis Avotiņš

== B ==
- Armands Bērziņš
- Māris Bičevskis
- Elvijs Biezais
- Viktors Bļinovs
- Edijs Brahmanis
- Roberts Bukarts

== C ==
- Mathieu Carle
- Oskars Cibuļskis
- Ronalds Cinks
- Aigars Cipruss
- Mārtiņš Cipulis

== D ==
- Lauris Dārziņš,
- Kaspars Daugaviņš
- Andris Džeriņš

== E ==
- Matt Ellison

== F ==
- Adrian Foster

== G ==
- Guntis Galviņš
- Alexandre Giroux
- Kristers Gudļevskis

== H ==
- Mark Hartigan
- Toms Hartmanis
- Chris Holt
- Marcel Hossa

== I ==
- Mike Iggulden
- Miks Indrašis
- Raitis Ivanāns

== J ==
- Jamie Johnson
- Māris Jučers

== K ==
- Vitaly Karamnov
- Martin Kariya
- Mārtiņš Karsums

== L ==
- Rodrigo Laviņš
- Miks Lipsbergs
- Niclas Lucenius
- Jamie Lundmark
- Edgars Lūsiņš

== M ==
- Edgars Masaļskis
- Gints Meija
- Björn Melin
- Juraj Mikúš
- Ervīns Muštukovs

== N ==
- Sergejs Naumovs
- Ville Nieminen
- Aleksandrs Ņiživijs
- Filip Novák

== O ==
- Sandis Ozoliņš

== P ==
- Vitālijs Pavlovs
- Sergejs Pečura
- Róbert Petrovický
- Ronald Petrovický
- Ainārs Podziņš
- Mārtiņš Porejs
- Martin Prusek
- Georgijs Pujacs

== R ==
- Jēkabs Rēdlihs
- Krišjānis Rēdlihs
- Miķelis Rēdlihs
- Arvīds Reķis

== S ==
- Agris Saviels
- Rob Schremp
- Jakub Šindel
- Aleksejs Širokovs
- Maksims Širokovs
- Gunārs Skvorcovs
- Oļegs Sorokins
- Kristaps Sotnieks
- Daniel Sperrle
- Jānis Sprukts
- Juris Štāls
- Jānis Straupe
- Tomáš Surový
- Lee Sweatt
- Paul Szczechura

== T ==
- Mikael Tellqvist
- Atvars Tribuncovs
- Brock Trotter

== U ==
- Juris Upītis

== V ==
- Raimonds Vilkoits

== W ==
- Fredrik Warg
- Duvie Westcott

== Player nationalities ==
| | Country | Players |
|---|---|---|
| (Latvia) | Latvia | 53 |
| (Canada) | Canada | 12 |
| (Slovakia) | Slovakia | 5 |
| (Sweden) | Sweden | 4 |
| (United States) | United States | 4 |
| (Czech Republic) | Czech Republic | 3 |
| (Finland) | Finland | 2 |
| (Russia) | Russia | 1 |
| | Total | 84 |
