= List of Latvians in the Kontinental Hockey League =

This is a list of Latvians, who have played at least a game in the Kontinental Hockey League.

== Players ==
Name	POS	GP	G	A	PTS	Birthplace	2014-2015	Previous clubs	Ref.
Kristaps Sotnieks	D	343	18	30	48	Rīga	Lada Togliatti	–	
Miķelis Rēdlihs ♦	F	356	73	107	180	Rīga	Dinamo Riga	Lokomotiv Yaroslavl	
Georgijs Pujacs	D	329	25	62	87	Rīga	Dinamo Riga	Lada Togliatti, Sibir Novosibirsk, Avangard Omsk, Dinamo Riga	
Mārtiņš Cipulis	F	301	40	41	81	Cēsis	Dinamo Riga	Amur Khabarovsk, Lev Prague	
Krišjānis Rēdlihs	D	284	29	70	99	Rīga	Dinamo Riga	–	
Lauris Dārziņš ♦	F	283	67	87	154	Rīga	Dinamo Riga	Ak Bars Kazan, Traktor Chelyabinsk	
Mārtiņš Karsums ♦	F	267	86	72	158	Rīga	HC Dynamo Moscow	Dinamo Riga	
Aleksandrs Ņiživijs	F	265	40	97	137	Rīga	–	Lev Prague, Dinamo Riga	
Guntis Galviņš	D	253	20	59	79	Talsi		Dinamo Riga, HC Yugra	
Gints Meija	F	249	21	29	50	Rīga	Dinamo Riga	–	
Jānis Sprukts	F	238	40	76	116	Rīga	Lokomotiv Yaroslavl	Dinamo Riga, CSKA Moscow	
Sandis Ozoliņš ♦	D	224	28	89	117	Sigulda	–	Atlant Mytishchi, Dinamo Riga	
Rodrigo Laviņš	D	206	8	20	28	Rīga	–	Dinamo Riga	
Andris Džeriņš	F	205	23	18	41	Aiviekste	Dinamo Riga	–	
Ģirts Ankipāns	F	202	28	41	69	Rīga	–	Dinamo Riga	
Roberts Bukarts	F	199	23	25	48	Jūrmala	Dinamo Riga	–	
Oskars Cibuļskis	D	197	11	25	36	Rīga	Dinamo Riga	–	
Arvīds Reķis	D	171	3	12	15	Jūrmala	–	Dinamo Riga	
Jēkabs Rēdlihs	D	163	5	9	14	Rīga	–	Dinamo Riga	
Miks Indrašis	F	156	43	49	92	Rīga	Dinamo Riga	–	
Oskars Bārtulis	D	140	6	16	22	Ogre	Barys Astana	Donbass Donetsk	
Māris Bičevskis	F	138	7	20	27	Rīga	Dinamo Riga	–	
Artūrs Kulda	D	138	14	20	34	Leipzig	Salavat Yulaev Ufa	Sibir Novosibirsk	
Edgars Masaļskis	G	130	–	–	–	Rīga	Dinamo Riga	HC Yugra	
Aleksandrs Jerofejevs	D	128	6	20	26	Rīga	Dinamo Riga	Neftekhimik Nizhnekamsk, Metallurg Novokuznetsk	
Gunārs Skvorcovs	F	118	7	7	14	Saldus	Dinamo Riga	–	
Aleksejs Širokovs	F	103	11	19	30	Rīga	–	Dinamo Riga, Amur Khabarovsk	
Kaspars Saulietis	F	98	11	7	18	Rīga	Dinamo Riga	Dinamo Minsk	
Kaspars Daugaviņš	F	91	27	24	51	Rīga	HC Dynamo Moscow	Dinamo Riga	
Ainārs Podziņš	F	81	6	5	11	Jūrmala	–	Dinamo Riga, Vityaz Podolsk	
Oļegs Sorokins	D	79	4	19	23	Rīga	–	Dinamo Riga	
Juris Upītis	F	70	5	5	10	Rīga	Dinamo Riga	–	
Armands Bērziņš	F	66	6	9	15	Rīga	–	Dinamo Riga	
Vitālijs Pavlovs	F	65	6	9	15	Rīga	–	Dinamo Riga	
Juris Štāls	F	59	4	3	7	Rīga	–	Dinamo Riga	
Raitis Ivanāns	F	39	0	1	1	Salaspils	–	Dinamo Riga	
Elvijs Biezais	F	39	0	1	1	Rīga	–	Dinamo Riga	
Atvars Tribuncovs	D	38	2	7	9	Ogre	–	Dinamo Riga	
Mārtiņš Porejs	D	38	2	3	5	Rīga	Dinamo Riga	–	
Māris Jučers	G	35	–	–	–	Priekule	Dinamo Riga	–	
Aigars Cipruss	F	32	1	1	2	Rīga	–	Dinamo Riga	
Sergejs Naumovs	G	29	–	–	–	Rīga	–	Dinamo Riga	
Rustams Begovs	F	28	2	2	4	Olaine	–	Dinamo Riga	
Artūrs Kuzmenkovs	F	25	0	1	1	Daugavpils	–	Dinamo Riga	
Viktors Bļinovs	F	24	2	1	3	Rīga	–	Dinamo Riga	
Ronalds Cinks	F	20	0	2	2	Rīga	–	Dinamo Riga	
Māris Jass	D	18	0	1	1	Daugavpils	–	Neftekhimik Niznekamsk	
Rodrigo Ābols	F	14	1	4	5	Rīga	Dinamo Riga	–	
Jānis Andersons	D	9	0	0	0	Rīga	–	Dinamo Riga	
Ralfs Grīnbergs	D	8	0	0	0	Rīga	Dinamo Riga	–	
Toms Hartmanis	F	7	0	0	0	Liepāja	–	Dinamo Riga	
Deivids Sarkanis	F	5	0	1	1	Riga	–	Dinamo Riga	
Jānis Straupe	F	5	0	0	0	Rīga	–	Dinamo Riga	
Edijs Brahmanis	F	4	1	0	1	Rīga	–	Dinamo Riga	
Nikolajs Jeļisejevs	F	4	0	1	1	Rīga	Dinamo Riga	–	
Sergejs Pečura	F	4	0	0	0	Rīga	–	Dinamo Riga	
Edgars Lūsiņš	G	4	–	–	–	Rīga	–	Dinamo Riga	
Miks Lipsbergs	F	4	0	0	0	Rīga	–	Dinamo Riga	
Andris Siksnis	F	4	0	0	0	Riga	–	Dinamo Riga	
Edmunds Augstkalns	D	4	0	0	0	Rīga	Dinamo Riga	–	
Raimonds Vilkoits	F	3	1	0	1	Rīga	–	Dinamo Riga	
Ervīns Muštukovs	G	2	–	–	–	Rīga	–	Dinamo Riga	
Agris Saviels	D	2	0	0	0	Jūrmala	–	Dinamo Riga	
Kristers Gudļevskis	G	2	–	–	–	Aiviekste	–	Dinamo Riga	
Edgars Siksna	D	2	0	0	0	Riga	–	Dinamo Riga	
Roberts Jekimovs	F	2	0	0	0	Rīga	Atlant Mytishchi	–	
Maksims Širokovs	D	1	0	0	0	Rīga	–	Dinamo Riga	
Uģis Avotiņš	G	1	–	–	–	Rīga	–	Dinamo Riga	

= Played during the 2014-15 season

A (♦) denotes player who has participated in an All Star Game

== See also ==
- List of Latvians in the NHL
