= 2008–09 Dinamo Riga season =

Season of Latvian ice hockey club

2008–09 Dinamo Riga
- Division: 2nd Kharlamov
- 2008–09 record: 24-23-5-4 (W–L–OTW-OTL)
- Home record: 14-9-3-2
- Road record: 10-14-2-2
- Goals for: 132
- Goals against: 156

Team information
- General manager: Normunds Sējējs
- Coach: Július Šupler
- Captain: Aleksejs Širokovs
- Alternate captains: Atvars Tribuncovs; Matt Ellison
- Arena: Arena Riga inbox.lv Arena
- Average attendance: 6,093

Team leaders
- Goals: Marcel Hossa (22)
- Assists: Marcel Hossa (22)
- Points: Marcel Hossa (44)
- Penalty minutes: Marcel Hossa (118)
- Plus/minus: Marcel Hossa (+3)
- Wins: Sergejs Naumovs (12)
- Goals against average: Martin Prusek (1.70)

The 2008–09 Dinamo Riga season was the first season of the franchise in the Kontinental Hockey League (KHL). This was also inaugural season for the league. Dinamo Riga played most of their home games in Arena Riga, however some matches were held in other locations. Dinamo Riga were playing in Kharlamov division along with Avangard Omsk, Lokomotiv Yaroslavl, HC Lada Togliatti, HC Sibir Novosibirsk and Amur Khabarovsk.

== Pre-season ==
As it is the first season for the franchise, Dinamo Riga had to gather their roster from nothing. Most of the team players are members of Latvia national team. First players for the team were announced on April 25. First foreign player to join the team was Czech Filip Novák on June 26. The team roster was completed, when the last two legionaries Duvie Westcott and Mark Hartigan joined the team on July 22.

Dinamo Riga started their pre-season training camp on July 15. The camp continued till July 28 and took place in Liptovský Mikuláš, Slovakia. The first game in franchise history was held on July 25, when Dinamo Riga defeated MHk 32 Liptovský Mikuláš in a shootout after a 1-1 in regular time.

On August 2 Dinamo played their first home game, when they won against Amur Khabarovsk in Riga. Then at the "Inbox.lv hall" in Riga, Dinamo won the Inbox.lv tournament, in which they defeated Dinamo Minsk and Barys Astana. In August the team also participated in the Tampere Cup (Tampere) and the Governor's Cup (Mytishchi).

=== Results ===
- Green background indicates win. (3 points)
- Red indicates loss. (0 points)
- Beige background indicates overtime/shootout win. (2 points)
- White background indicates overtime/shootout loss (1 point).

2008–09 pre-season games

Record: 5–3–1–3 (home: 3–0–0–0; road: 1–2–1–1; neutral: 1–2–0–1)
#	Date	Visitor	Score	Home	OT	Decision	Attendance	Record	Recap
1	July 25	Dinamo Riga	3 – 1	MHk 32 Liptovský Mikuláš	SO	Masaļskis	?	0–0–1–0
2	August 2	Amur Khabarovsk	2 – 3	Dinamo Riga		Masaļskis	1,214	1–0–1–0
3	August 4	Dinamo Minsk	1 – 5	Dinamo Riga		Naumovs	?	2–0–1–0
4	August 6	Barys Astana	2 – 7	Dinamo Riga		Masaļskis	?	3–0–1–0
5	August 13	Dinamo Riga	3 – 1	Tappara		Naumovs	?	4–0–1–0
6	August 14	Dinamo Riga	1 – 3	Ilves		Masaļskis	?	4–1–1–0
7	August 15	Espoo Blues	3 – 2	Dinamo Riga in Tampere, Finland	SO	Naumovs	?	4–1–1–1
8	August 16	Dinamo Riga	3 – 4	Espoo Blues in Tampere, Finland		Muštukovs	?	4–2–1–1
9	August 23	Dinamo Riga	1 – 3	Atlant Mytishchi		Masaļskis	4,000	4–3–1–1
10	August 24	Neftekhimik Nizhnekamsk	3 – 2	Dinamo Riga in Mytishchi, Russia	OT	Masaļskis	400	4–3–1–2
11	August 26	Dinamo Riga	4 – 2	HC Lada Togliatti in Mytishchi, Russia		Masaļskis	250	5–3–1–2
12	August 27	Dinamo Riga	2 – 3	Atlant Mytishchi	SO	Masaļskis	?	5–3–1–3

== Regular season ==
Dinamo Riga will play 56 games in regular season. The season will begin on September 2, 2008, it is coming to close on February 26, 2008.

=== Division standings ===
as before 25 October 2008

Kharlamov division	GP	W	L	OTW	OTL	GF	GA	PTS
Avangard Omsk	20	11	7	1	1	69	55	36
Lokomotiv Yaroslavl	18	11	5	0	2	51	36	35
Dinamo Riga	20	9	7	1	3	49	60	32
Lada Togliatti	19	6	9	2	2	45	50	24
Sibir Novosibirsk	19	5	8	3	3	45	57	24
Amur Khabarovsk	21	4	13	2	2	38	64	18

=== League standings ===
as before 25 October 2008

Kontinental Hockey League	GP	W	L	OTW	OTL	GF	GA	PTS
Atlant Mytishchi	20	14	2	2	2	77	40	48
Salavat Yulaev Ufa	19	13	3	2	1	70	32	44
Ak Bars Kazan	19	11	4	2	2	65	50	39
Avangard Omsk	20	11	7	1	1	69	55	36
Lokomotiv Yaroslavl	18	11	5	0	2	51	36	35
CSKA Moscow	18	9	4	3	2	55	42	35
Metallurg Magnitogorsk	20	9	7	3	1	56	53	34
Traktor Chelyabinsk	19	9	5	1	4	54	55	33
Dynamo Moscow	18	8	5	4	1	51	39	33
Spartak Moscow	21	8	8	4	1	75	68	33
Dinamo Riga	20	9	7	1	3	49	60	32
Neftekhimik Nizhnekamsk	20	9	6	0	5	50	50	32
Barys Astana	21	7	8	5	1	65	59	32
Severstal Cherepovets	19	8	7	3	1	56	61	31
SKA Saint Petersburg	19	7	8	4	0	44	34	29
Metallurg Novokuznetsk	21	6	10	3	2	57	57	26
Lada Togliatti	19	6	9	2	2	45	50	24
Sibir Novosibirsk	19	5	8	3	3	45	57	24
MVD Moscow Oblast	20	5	11	3	1	47	60	22
Torpedo Nizhny Novgorod	20	6	12	0	2	46	60	20
Amur Khabarovsk	21	4	13	2	2	38	64	18
Vityaz Chekhov	20	2	9	2	7	47	71	17
Dinamo Minsk	20	3	14	2	1	36	72	14
Khimik Voskresensk	19	3	11	0	5	34	57	14

=== Results ===
- Green background indicates win. (3 points)
- Red indicates loss. (0 points)
- Beige background indicates overtime/shootout win. (2 points)
- White background indicates overtime/shootout loss (1 point).

2008–09 game log

September: 5–3–1–2 (home: 3–0–0–0; road: 2–3–1–2)
#	Date	Visitor	Score	Home	OT	Decision	Attendance	Record	Pts	Recap
1	September 2	Dinamo Riga	4 – 2	Amur Khabarovsk		Masaļskis	7,100	1–0–0–0	3
2	September 3	Dinamo Riga	6 – 7	Amur Khabarovsk	SO	Masaļskis	7,100	1–0–0–1	4
3	September 5	Dinamo Riga	0 – 7	Metallurg Novokuznetsk		Naumovs	4,500	1–1–0–1	4
4	September 7	Dinamo Riga	1 – 2	Sibir Novosibirsk	OT	Masaļskis	6,000	1–1–0–2	5
5	September 8	Dinamo Riga	1 – 6	Sibir Novosibirsk		Masaļskis	5,000	1–2–0–2	5
6	September 11	MVD Moscow Oblast	1 – 2	Dinamo Riga		Masaļskis	10,232	2–2–0–2	8
7	September 14	Atlant Mytishchi	0 – 2	Dinamo Riga		Masaļskis	7,502	3–2–0–2	11
8	September 15	Torpedo Nizhny Novgorod	1 – 4	Dinamo Riga		Masaļskis	4,936	4–2–0–2	14
9	September 22	Dinamo Riga	4 – 3	CSKA Moscow		Naumovs	2,500	5–2–0–2	17
10	September 24	Dinamo Riga	1 – 5	Spartak Moscow		Naumovs	1,500	5–3–0–2	17
11	September 26	Dinamo Riga	3 – 2	Vityaz Chekhov	SO	Naumovs	1,800	5–3–1–2	19

October: 4–7–0–1 (home: 2–5–0–1; road: 2–2–0–0)
#	Date	Visitor	Score	Home	OT	Decision	Attendance	Record	Pts	Recap
12	October 1	Dynamo Moscow	3 – 4	Dinamo Riga		Naumovs	8,528	6–3–1–2	22
13	October 6	Dinamo Minsk	5 – 8	Dinamo Riga		Naumovs	2,300	7–3–1–2	25
14	October 9	SKA Saint Petersburg	2 – 1	Dinamo Riga	SO	Naumovs	9,950	7–3–1–3	26
15	October 11	Severstal Cherepovets	2 – 1	Dinamo Riga		Naumovs	7,582	7–4–1–3	26
16	October 13	Lokomotiv Yaroslavl	3 – 2	Dinamo Riga		Naumovs	6,350	7–5–1–3	26
17	October 18	Dinamo Riga	2 – 1	Khimik Voskresensk		Sperrle	3,000	8–5–1–3	29
18	October 20	Dinamo Riga	0 – 3	Barys Astana		Sperrle	5,000	8–6–1–3	29
19	October 22	Dinamo Riga	3 – 2	Avangard Omsk		Naumovs	9,300	9–6–1–3	32
20	October 23	Dinamo Riga	0 – 3	Avangard Omsk		Sperrle	9,100	9–7–1–3	32
21	October 26	Ak Bars Kazan	3 – 2	Dinamo Riga (in Espoo)		Naumovs	2,800	9–8–1–3	32
22	October 27	Lada Togliatti	6 – 0	Dinamo Riga (in Espoo)		Naumovs, Sperrle	1,600	9–9–1–3	32
23	October 29	Neftekhimik Nizhnekamsk	5– 1	Dinamo Riga		Naumovs	2,000	9–10–1–3	32

November: 0–2–0–0 (home: 0–0–0–0; road: 0–2–0–0)
#	Date	Visitor	Score	Home	OT	Decision	Attendance	Record	Pts	Recap
24	November 13	Dinamo Riga	3 – 5	Metallurg Magnitogorsk		Prusek	3,900	9–11–1–3	32
25	November 15	Dinamo Riga	3 – 4	Traktor Chelyabinsk		Prusek, Naumovs	3,500	9–12–1–3	32
26	November 17	Dinamo Riga	0 – 4	Salavat Yulaev Ufa		Naumovs, Avotiņš, Naumovs	8,400	9–13–1–3	32
27	November 24	Lada Togliatti		Dinamo Riga
28	November 26	Traktor Chelyabinsk		Dinamo Riga
29	November 27	Metallurg Magnitogorsk		Dinamo Riga
30	November 29	Salavat Yulaev Ufa		Dinamo Riga

December: 0–0–0–0 (home: 0–0–0–0; road: 0–0–0–0)
#	Date	Visitor	Score	Home	OT	Decision	Attendance	Record	Pts	Recap
31	December 3	Dinamo Riga		Lokomotiv Yaroslavl
32	December 5	Dinamo Riga		Dinamo Minsk
33	December 7	Dinamo Riga		Ak Bars Kazan
34	December 9	Dinamo Riga		Lada Togliatti
35	December 11	Dinamo Riga		Neftekhimik Nizhnekamsk
36	December 24	Avangard Omsk		Dinamo Riga
37	December 27	Khimik Voskresensk		Dinamo Riga
38	December 28	Barys Astana		Dinamo Riga

January: 0–0–0–0 (home: 0–0–0–0; road: 0–0–0–0)
#	Date	Visitor	Score	Home	OT	Decision	Attendance	Record	Pts	Recap
39	January 3	Dinamo Riga		SKA Saint Petersburg
40	January 5	Dinamo Riga		Severstal Cherepovets
41	January 7	Dinamo Riga		Lokomotiv Yaroslavl
42	January 9	Dinamo Riga		Lada Togliatti
43	January 16	Avangard Omsk		Dinamo Riga
44	January 19	Lokomotiv Yaroslavl		Dinamo Riga
45	January 22	Dinamo Riga		Dynamo Moscow
46	January 25	Vityaz Chekhov		Dinamo Riga
47	January 28	Spartak Moscow		Dinamo Riga
48	January 29	CSKA Moscow		Dinamo Riga

February: 0–0–0–0 (home: 0–0–0–0; road: 0–0–0–0)
#	Date	Visitor	Score	Home	OT	Decision	Attendance	Record	Pts	Recap
49	February 12	Dinamo Riga		MVD Moscow Oblast
50	February 14	Dinamo Riga		Atlant Mytishchi
51	February 16	Dinamo Riga		Torpedo Nizhny Novgorod
52	February 20	Sibir Novosibirsk		Dinamo Riga
53	February 21	Sibir Novosibirsk		Dinamo Riga
54	February 23	Metallurg Novokuznetsk		Dinamo Riga
55	February 25	Amur Khabarovsk		Dinamo Riga
56	February 26	Amur Khabarovsk		Dinamo Riga

== Player stats ==
=== Skaters ===
Note: GP = Games played; G = Goals; A = Assists; Pts = Points; +/- = Plus/minus; PIM = Penalty minutes

Player	GP	G	A	Pts	+/-	PIM
Marcel Hossa	20	12	7	19	0	49
Matt Ellison	20	5	12	17	0	39
Mark Hartigan	19	8	4	12	–1	34
Filip Novák	19	2	6	8	–3	22
Aleksandrs Ņiživijs	20	2	6	8	–6	4
Aleksejs Širokovs	20	2	6	8	–2	8
Duvie Westcott	19	1	7	8	0	47
Mārtiņš Cipulis	20	1	5	6	–6	8
Miķelis Rēdlihs	19	5	0	5	–4	8
Lauris Dārziņš	20	1	4	5	–2	22
Ronald Petrovický	19	2	2	4	–2	33
Rodrigo Laviņš	20	1	3	4	0	12
Ģirts Ankipāns	17	2	1	3	–2	4
Viktors Bļinovs	18	2	1	3	–2	8
Juris Štāls	14	1	2	3	2	8
Atvars Tribuncovs	16	1	2	3	–3	38
Armands Bērziņš	9	0	2	2	1	31
Oļegs Sorokins	12	0	2	2	–2	16
Aigars Cipruss	3	0	1	1	–2	4
Guntis Galviņš	15	0	1	1	–4	8
Maksims Širokovs	1	0	0	0	–1	0
Krišjānis Rēdlihs	1	0	0	0	–1	4
Sergejs Pečura	2	0	0	0	0	0
Ronalds Cinks	2	0	0	0	0	0
Agris Saviels	2	0	0	0	0	4
Kristaps Sotnieks	15	0	0	0	–4	6

=== Goaltenders ===
Note: GP = Games played; Min = Minutes played; W = Wins; L = Losses; OTW = Overtime/shootout wins; OTL = Overtime/shootout losses; GA = Goals against; SO = Shutouts; Sv% = Save percentage; GAA = Goals against average

Player	GP	Min	W	L	OTW	OTL	GA	SO	Sv%	GAA
Sergejs Naumovs	11	588:15	5	4	1	1	33	0	0.899	3.37
Edgars Masaļskis	8	406:40	4	2	0	2	18	1	0.915	2.66
Daniel Sperrle	4	219:38	1	3	0	0	7	0	0.926	1.91

== Roster ==
Goaltenders
#		Player	Pos.	Catches	Height	Weight	Place of birth
30	(Latvia)	Sergejs Naumovs	G	L	178 cm	78 kg	Riga, Latvia
35	(Czech Republic)	Martin Prusek	G	L	185 cm	78 kg	Ostrava, Czech Republic
39	(Latvia)	Ervīns Muštukovs	G	R	188 cm	68 kg	Riga, Latvia
40	(Latvia)	Uģis Avotiņš	G		185 cm	70 kg	Riga, Latvia

Defencemen
#		Player	Pos.	Shoots	Height	Weight	Place of birth
2	(Latvia)	C Rodrigo Laviņš	D	L	180 cm	84 kg	Riga, Latvia
4	(Latvia)	Agris Saviels	D	L	187 cm	90 kg	Jūrmala, Latvia
5	(Latvia)	Guntis Galviņš	D	L	187 cm	86 kg	Talsi, Latvia
9	(Latvia)	Krišjānis Rēdlihs	D	L	189 cm	86 kg	Riga, Latvia
11	(Latvia)	Kristaps Sotnieks	D	L	180 cm	80 kg	Riga, Latvia
13	(Latvia)	Maksims Širokovs	D	L	181 cm	87 kg	Riga, Latvia
14	(Czech Republic)	Filip Novák	D	L	182 cm	82 kg	Budweis, S. Bohemia, Czech Republic
15	(Canada)	Duvie Westcott	D	R	180 cm	89 kg	Winnipeg, Manitoba, Canada
23	(Latvia)	A Atvars Tribuncovs	D	L	188 cm	100 kg	Ogre, Latvia
28	(Latvia)	Oļegs Sorokins	D	L	178 cm	80 kg	Riga, Latvia

Forwards
#		Player	Pos.	Shoots	Height	Weight	Place of birth
3	(Latvia)	Ronalds Cinks	RW	L	183 cm	80 kg	Riga, Latvia
6	(Latvia)	Juris Štāls	RW	L	191 cm	91 kg	Riga, Latvia
8	(Latvia)	Viktors Bļinovs	F	L	178 cm	80 kg	Riga, Latvia
10	(Latvia)	Lauris Dārziņš	LW	R	190 cm	90 kg	Riga, Latvia
12	(Canada)	Mark Hartigan	C	L	185 cm	93 kg	Fort St. John, British Columbia, Canada
17	(Latvia)	Aleksandrs Ņiživijs	RW	R	177 cm	77 kg	Riga, Latvia
19	(Latvia)	Miķelis Rēdlihs	F	L	179 cm	78 kg	Riga, Latvia
21	(Latvia)	Armands Bērziņš	C	L	192 cm	90 kg	Riga, Latvia
22	(Latvia)	Toms Hartmanis	C	L	183 cm	82 kg	Ogre, Latvia
24	(Latvia)	Aleksejs Širokovs	C	R	182 cm	86 kg	Riga, Latvia
27	(Slovakia)	Ronald Petrovický	RW	R	183 cm	86 kg	Žilina, Žilina, Slovakia
29	(Latvia)	Aigars Cipruss	LW	L	178 cm	80 kg	Riga, Latvia
47	(Latvia)	Mārtiņš Cipulis	LW	L	180 cm	81 kg	Riga, Latvia
75	(Latvia)	Ģirts Ankipāns	LW	L	186 cm	96 kg	Riga, Latvia
81	(Slovakia)	Marcel Hossa	LW	L	192 cm	100 kg	Ilava, Trenčín, Slovakia
83	(Canada)	A Matt Ellison	C	R	183 cm	87 kg	Duncan, British Columbia, Canada
87	(Latvia)	Gints Meija	F	L	183 cm	72 kg	Riga, Latvia

== See also ==
- 2008-09 Kontinental Hockey League season
- Ice hockey in Europe
- Hockey Europe

== Minor League affiliates ==
- BEL - HK Riga 2000
