= Kristaps Sotnieks =

Latvian ice hockey player (born 1987)

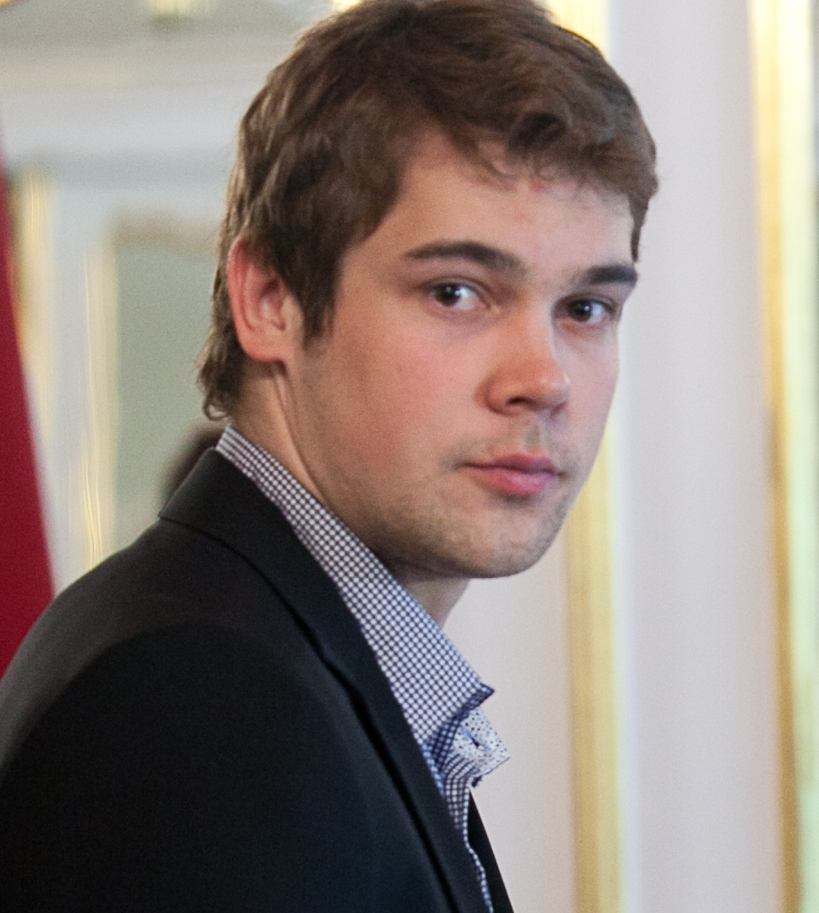
- Born: January 29, 1987 (age 38); Riga, Soviet Union
- Height: 6 ft 0 in (183 cm)
- Weight: 192 lb (87 kg; 13 st 10 lb)
- Position: Defence
- Shoots: Left
- KHL team Former teams: Dinamo Riga; HK Riga 2000; Lada Togliatti
- National team: Latvia
- Playing career: 2005–present

Kristaps Sotnieks (born January 29, 1987) is a Latvian professional ice-hockey defenseman. He currently plays for Dinamo Riga in the Kontinental Hockey League (KHL).

== Playing career ==
In his first season in senior hockey in 2004/05, Sotnieks mostly played for the reserves squad of HK Riga 2000 which played in the Latvian hockey league, however he also played 5 matches in the main team of Riga 2000 in Belarusian Extraliga. Due to the 2004–05 NHL lockout, the squad of Riga 2000 was quite impressive that year, including NHLers Kārlis Skrastiņš, Sergejs Žoltoks, and Darby Hendrickson, thus it was especially tough for youngsters like Sotnieks to get through on the main team. In 2005, Sotnieks played in five matches for Latvia at the U18 World Championships.

The next season, Sotnieks was already a regular player in the main team of Riga 2000, which won bronze medals in the Belarusian Extraliga. In 42 matches, he scored one goal, gave 4 assists, and got 10 penalty minutes. In 2006, Sotnieks represented Latvia at the 2006 World Junior Ice Hockey Championships in Canada, earning 2 points for assists as Latvia was relegated to Division I.

The next two years, Riga 2000 played only in the Latvian hockey league with Sotnieks as one of the most reliable defenders on the team. In 2005, 2006, and 2007, as a member of Riga 2000, Sotnieks won Latvian league titles.

When Dinamo Riga was formed in 2008 Sotnieks wasn't among the players who were expected to be playing regularly for the side which included former NHLers like Duvie Westcott and Filip Novák, as well as a whole selection of players who had played for Latvia national ice hockey team at several world championships - Atvars Tribuncovs, Rodrigo Laviņš, Guntis Galviņš, Krišjānis Rēdlihs, Oļegs Sorokins and Agris Saviels. Thus, Sotnieks was expected to be a leading defender for HK Riga 2000 (the farm club of Dinamo) playing in the Belarusian league. However, Sotnieks became a regular for Dinamo. As of 17 February 2009, he has played 43 matches for Dinamo in the KHL, scoring two goals.

== International play ==
In February 2009 Sotnieks played for Latvia national ice hockey team in the Qualification to 2010 Winter Olympics, scoring two assists in three games and earning Latvia a qualification spot at the Olympics.

== Career statistics ==
=== Regular season and playoffs ===
			Regular season					Playoffs
Season	Team	League	GP	G	A	Pts	PIM	GP	G	A	Pts	PIM
2004–05	HK Rīga 2000	BLR	5	0	0	0	4	—	—	—	—	—
2004–05	HK Rīga 2000	LAT	21	2	1	3	14	2	0	0	0	4
2005–06	HK Rīga 2000	BLR	37	1	4	5	10	5	0	0	0	0
2005–06	HK Rīga 2000	LAT	—	3	6	9	12	—	—	—	—	—
2006–07	HK Rīga 2000	LAT	34	3	6	9	67	11	2	0	2	4
2007–08	HK Rīga 2000	LAT	40	2	2	4	28	7	2	0	2	4
2008–09	Dinamo Rīga	KHL	46	2	1	3	34	3	0	0	0	2
2008–09	HK Rīga 2000	LAT	—	—	—	—	—	7	0	0	0	14
2009–10	Dinamo Rīga	KHL	48	0	2	2	28	9	0	2	2	6
2009–10	Dinamo Juniors Rīga	BLR	1	0	1	1	0	—	—	—	—	—
2009–10	Dinamo Juniors Rīga	LAT	—	—	—	—	—	5	1	2	3	2
2010–11	Dinamo Rīga	KHL	45	2	6	8	12	11	0	1	1	4
2011–12	Dinamo Rīga	KHL	49	2	4	6	41	6	0	1	1	2
2012–13	Dinamo Rīga	KHL	47	3	5	8	12	—	—	—	—	—
2013–14	Dinamo Rīga	KHL	53	5	6	11	49	7	1	1	2	0
2014–15	Dinamo Rīga	KHL	55	4	6	10	34	—	—	—	—	—
2015–16	Dinamo Rīga	KHL	60	2	12	14	26	—	—	—	—	—
2016–17	Lada Togliatti	KHL	56	6	8	14	24	—	—	—	—	—
2017–18	Lada Togliatti	KHL	17	2	0	2	8	—	—	—	—	—
2018–19	Dinamo Rīga	KHL	55	3	7	10	28	—	—	—	—	—
2019–20	Dinamo Rīga	KHL	60	4	6	10	20	—	—	—	—	—
2020–21	Dinamo Rīga	KHL	26	0	4	4	4	—	—	—	—	—
2021–22	Dinamo Rīga	KHL	27	1	1	2	10	—	—	—	—	—
KHL totals			644	36	68	104	330	36	1	5	6	14

=== International ===
Year	Team	Event	GP	G	A	Pts	PIM
2005	Latvia	U18 D1	5	0	0	0	2
2006	Latvia	WJC	6	0	2	2	6
2007	Latvia	WJC D1	5	1	2	3	2
2009	Latvia	OGQ	3	0	1	1	2
2009	Latvia	WC	7	0	1	1	8
2010	Latvia	OG	4	1	0	1	4
2010	Latvia	WC	6	0	1	1	0
2011	Latvia	WC	6	0	4	4	6
2012	Latvia	WC	7	0	0	0	0
2013	Latvia	OGQ	3	0	0	0	0
2013	Latvia	WC	7	0	0	0	12
2014	Latvia	OG	5	0	1	1	0
2014	Latvia	WC	7	1	2	3	8
2015	Latvia	WC	7	0	0	0	27
2016	Latvia	OGQ	3	0	1	1	2
2016	Latvia	WC	7	1	2	3	2
2017	Latvia	WC	7	0	2	2	0
2018	Latvia	WC	8	0	2	2	0
2019	Latvia	WC	7	0	1	1	0
2021	Latvia	WC	7	0	2	2	0
2021	Latvia	OGQ	3	0	0	0	2
2022	Latvia	WC	7	0	2	2	2
Junior totals			16	1	4	5	10
Senior totals			111	3	22	25	75
