= Sperrle =

Sperrle is a surname. Notable people with the surname include:

- Daniel Sperrle (born 1982), Swedish professional ice hockey player
- Hugo Sperrle (1885–1953), German field marshal and World War II Luftwaffe officer
