= Viesturs (name) =

Given name and surname

- Gender: Male
- Language: Latvian
- Name day: 28 June

Origin
- Origin: viesturis
- Meaning: hospitable
- Region of origin: Latvia

Other names
- Related names: Viestarts, Viestdards

Viesturs is both a Latvian masculine given name, and less commonly, a surname. The name is derived from the Latvian viesturis, meaning "hospitable". The first recorded usage of the name in the areas of modern-day Latvia date from the 12th and 13th-centuries.

Individuals bearing the name Viesturs include:

Given name

- Viesturs (also, Viestards, Viesthard, and Vesthardus; d. 1230), Semigallian duke
- Viesturs Bērziņš (born 1974), Latvian cyclist
- Viesturs Kairišs (born 1971), Latvian opera, film, and theatre director
- Viesturs Koziols (born 1963), Latvian real estate developer, media and sports entrepreneur, photographer, and political and public figure
- Viesturs Lukševics (born 1987), Latvian cyclist
- Viesturs Meijers (born 1967), Latvian chess Grandmaster

Surname

- Ed Viesturs (born 1959), American mountaineer

== See also ==
- Order of Viesturs
