= List of Dinamo Riga seasons =

This is a list of seasons completed by the Dinamo Riga. This list documents the records and playoff results for all season the Dinamo Riga have completed since their inception in 2008.

Gagarin Cup Champions	Conference champions	Division champions	Continental Cup Winners

Note: GP = Games played, W = Wins, L = Losses, OTW = Overtime/shootout wins, OTL = Overtime/shootout losses, Pts = Points, GF = Goals for, GA = Goals against, PIM = Penalties in minutes

Season	Team	GP	W	L	OTW	OTL	Pts	GF	GA	Finish	Playoffs
2008–09	2008–09	56	24	5	4	23	86	132	156	2nd, Kharlamov	Lost in First Round, 0–3 (Dynamo Moscow)
2009–10	2009–10	56	23	22	4	7	84	174	175	5th, Bobrov	Lost in Conference Quarterfinals, 4–2 (Dynamo Moscow); Lost in Conference Semifinals, 1–4 (HC MVD)
2010–11	2010–11	54	20	20	7	7	81	160	149	4th, Bobrov	Lost in Conference Quarterfinals, 3–1 (SKA Saint Petersburg); Lost in Conference Semifinals, 1–4 (Lokomotiv Yaroslavl)
2011–12	2011–12	54	24	5	4	23	86	132	156	3rd, Bobrov	Lost in Conference Quarterfinals, 3–4 (Torpedo Nizhny Novgorod)
2012–13	2012–13	52	13	31	4	4	51	109	151	7th, Bobrov	Did not qualify (won Nadezhda Cup)
2013–14	2013–14	54	22	16	11	5	93	141	122	3rd, Bobrov	Lost in Conference Quarterfinals, 3–4 (Donbass Donetsk)
2014–15	2014–15	60	22	30	3	5	77	136	160	5th, Bobrov	Did not qualify
2015–16	2015–16	60	17	27	8	8	75	129	151	7th, Bobrov	Did not qualify
2016–17	2016–17	60	11	34	10	5	58	116	158	7th, Bobrov	Did not qualify
2017–18	2017–18	56	–	–	–	–	–	–	–	6th, Bobrov	Did not qualify
Season	Team	GP	W	L	OTW	OTL	Pts	GF	GA	Finish	Playoffs
Reg. season totals		506	176	190	55	87	707	1229	1378	—	5 Playoff Appearances
Playoff totals		42	15	22	--	--	--	88	120		All-time series record: 2-5
Grand totals		548	191	212	55	87	707	1317	1498		
