= Māris Bičevskis =

Latvian ice hockey player

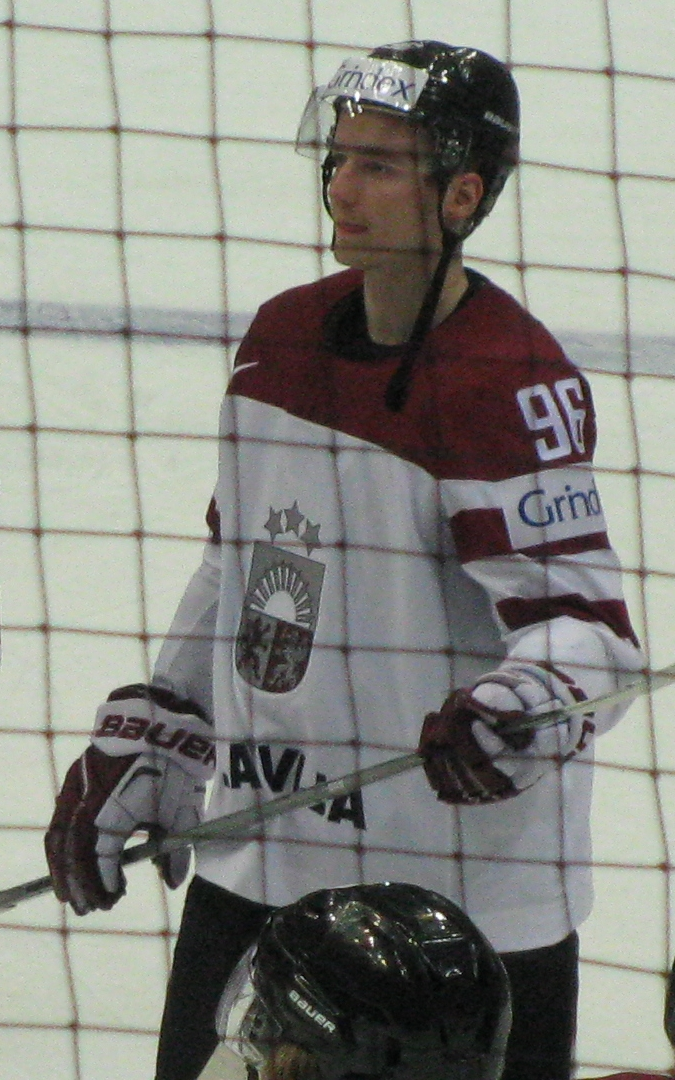
- Born: 3 August 1991 (age 34) Riga, Latvia
- Height: 5 ft 11 in (180 cm)
- Weight: 174 lb (79 kg; 12 st 6 lb)
- Position: Forward
- Shoots: Left
- ELH team Former teams: BK Mladá Boleslav; SK LSPA/Riga; Dinamo Riga; HK Liepāja; Mountfield HK
- National team: Latvia
- NHL draft: Undrafted
- Playing career: 2009–present

Māris Bičevskis (born 3 August 1991) is a Latvian professional ice hockey player for BK Mladá Boleslav of the Czech Extraliga (ELH). He is also a part of Latvia men's national ice hockey team.

In December 2011, made his debut with Dinamo Riga in official matches in Spengler Cup. On January 9, 2012 he made his KHL debut in a win against Dynamo Moscow.

Having left Dinamo Riga as a free agent, Bičevskis signed a two-year contract with Czech club, Mountfield HK of the ELH, from the 2018–19 season.

== Career statistics ==
=== Regular season and playoffs ===
			Regular season					Playoffs
Season	Team	League	GP	G	A	Pts	PIM	GP	G	A	Pts	PIM
2007–08	SK Riga 18	LHL-2	12	5	3	8	32	—	—	—	—	—
2008–09	SK LSPA/Riga	LHL	27	2	3	5	30	—	—	—	—	—
2009–10	Dinamo Juniors Riga	BXL	41	0	4	4	18	—	—	—	—	—
2010–11	HK Riga	MHL	49	17	18	35	52	1	0	0	0	0
2011–12	HK Riga	MHL	33	8	13	21	76	1	0	0	0	2
2011–12	Dinamo Riga	KHL	15	1	1	2	4	5	0	0	0	4
2012–13	Dinamo Riga	KHL	45	1	4	5	24	—	—	—	—	—
2012–13	HK Juniors Riga	LHL	—	—	—	—	—	2	0	1	1	0
2013–14	Dinamo Riga	KHL	26	0	4	4	13	7	1	3	4	6
2013–14	Dinamo Juniors Riga	LHL	6	4	2	6	6	—	—	—	—	—
2014–15	Dinamo Riga	KHL	52	5	11	16	47	—	—	—	—	—
2014–15	HK Liepāja	LHL	—	—	—	—	—	4	1	4	5	2
2015–16	Dinamo Riga	KHL	36	1	1	2	12	—	—	—	—	—
2016–17	Dinamo Riga	KHL	51	8	8	16	26	—	—	—	—	—
2017–18	Dinamo Riga	KHL	54	1	5	6	26	—	—	—	—	—
2018–19	Mountfield HK	ELH	41	2	8	10	24	4	0	1	1	6
2019–20	Mountfield HK	ELH	7	0	0	0	2	—	—	—	—	—
2019–20	BK Mladá Boleslav	ELH	36	5	6	11	20	—	—	—	—	—
2020–21	BK Mladá Boleslav	ELH	52	6	11	17	26	11	1	0	1	4
KHL totals			279	17	34	51	152	12	1	3	4	10
ELH totals			136	13	25	38	72	15	1	1	2	10

=== International ===
Year	Team	Event	Result	GP	G	A	Pts	PIM
2008	Latvia	WJC18-D1	13th	5	3	0	3	2
2009	Latvia	WJC18-D1	12th	5	2	3	5	4
2011	Latvia	WJC-D1	11th	5	2	2	4	2
2016	Latvia	WC	13th	7	1	0	1	8
2017	Latvia	WC	10th	6	0	1	1	0
2019	Latvia	WC	10th	5	0	0	0	25
2021	Latvia	WC	11th	1	0	0	0	0
Junior totals				15	7	5	12	8
Senior totals				19	1	1	2	33
