= Edgars Lūsiņš =

Latvian ice hockey player (born 1984)

- Born: 25 December 1984 (age 41) Riga, Soviet Union
- Height: 5 ft 9 in (175 cm)
- Weight: 183 lb (83 kg; 13 st 1 lb)
- Position: Goaltender
- Shot: left
- KHL team Former teams: Dinamo Riga; Dayton Gems; Zemgale; ASK Ogre; HK Riga 2000; HK Ozolnieki/Monarhs; Fischtown Pinguins
- National team: Latvia
- Playing career: 2000–present

Edgars Lūsiņš (born 25 December 1984 in Riga, Soviet Union) is a former Latvian ice hockey goaltender, who played up until 2019, lastly for Prizma Riga in the Latvian Amateur Championship. Following his player’s career, he became a goaltender trainer in the DEL as well as for the Latvian national youth and senior teams.
