= Ronald Petrovický =

Slovak ice hockey player

- Born: February 15, 1977 (age 49) Žilina, Czechoslovakia
- Height: 5 ft 11 in (180 cm)
- Weight: 190 lb (86 kg; 13 st 8 lb)
- Position: Right wing
- Shot: Right
- Played for: EV Zug; Calgary Flames; New York Rangers; Atlanta Thrashers; Pittsburgh Penguins; Dinamo Riga
- National team: Slovakia
- NHL draft: 228th overall, 1996; Calgary Flames
- Playing career: 1994–2010

Ronald Petrovický (born February 15, 1977) is a Slovak former ice hockey right winger. He played professionally in Europe and in North America in the National Hockey League (NHL) as well as international play for the Slovakia men's national ice hockey team.

== Playing career ==
As a youth, Petrovický played in the 1991 Quebec International Pee-Wee Hockey Tournament with a team from Poprad.

Petrovicky moved to Canada to play junior hockey with the Tri-City Americans, Prince George Cougars and the Regina Pats of the Western Hockey League (WHL). While a member of the Cougars, the Calgary Flames chose him in the 1996 NHL entry draft. He would sign with the Flames organization in 1998, and played for the Flames' American Hockey League (AHL) affiliate for two seasons before joining Calgary. He played two seasons for the NHL team before joining the New York Rangers via the 2002 NHL Waiver Draft for the 2002–03 season. A year later, he was transferred to the Atlanta Thrashers, again via the waiver draft.

During the NHL lockout, Petrovicky played his first professional hockey in Europe, playing for Zilina and Brynas. He played one more season with the Thrashers before joining the Pittsburgh Penguins. For the 2007–08 season, Petrovicky moved to Europe, playing for Dukla Trencin, EV Zug and Modo Hockey. He signed with Dinamo Riga for the 2008–09 season. He was released on 24 December 2008.

Just before the 2009 NHL pre-season, Petrovicky was invited to training camp by the Vancouver Canucks but was released from camp on September 23, 2009.

== International ==
He also played with the Slovakia men's national ice hockey team in the 2000 and 2004 Ice Hockey World Championships. He won the silver medal as part of the 2000 Slovak team.

== Career statistics ==
=== Regular season and playoffs ===
			Regular season					Playoffs
Season	Team	League	GP	G	A	Pts	PIM	GP	G	A	Pts	PIM
1993–94	Dukla Trenčín	SVK	1	0	0	0	0	—	—	—	—	—
1994–95	Tri–City Americans	WHL	39	4	11	15	86	—	—	—	—	—
1994–95	Prince George Cougars	WHL	21	4	6	10	37	—	—	—	—	—
1995–96	Prince George Cougars	WHL	39	19	21	40	61	—	—	—	—	—
1996–97	Prince George Cougars	WHL	72	32	37	69	119	15	4	9	13	31
1997–98	Regina Pats	WHL	71	64	49	113	168	9	2	4	6	11
1998–99	Saint John Flames	AHL	78	12	21	33	114	7	1	2	3	19
1999–00	Saint John Flames	AHL	67	23	33	56	131	3	1	1	2	6
2000–01	Calgary Flames	NHL	30	4	5	9	54	—	—	—	—	—
2001–02	Calgary Flames	NHL	77	5	7	12	85	—	—	—	—	—
2002–03	New York Rangers	NHL	66	5	9	14	77	—	—	—	—	—
2003–04	Atlanta Thrashers	NHL	78	16	15	31	123	—	—	—	—	—
2004–05	MsHK Žilina	SVK	34	10	9	19	34	—	—	—	—	—
2004–05	Brynäs IF	SEL	10	0	5	5	25	—	—	—	—	—
2005–06	Atlanta Thrashers	NHL	60	8	12	20	62	—	—	—	—	—
2006–07	Pittsburgh Penguins	NHL	31	3	3	6	28	3	0	0	0	2
2006–07	Wilkes-Barre/Scranton Penguins	AHL	4	0	0	0	4	—	—	—	—	—
2007–08	Dukla Trenčín	SVK	2	0	1	1	2	—	—	—	—	—
2007–08	MODO Hockey	SEL	18	1	1	2	10	—	—	—	—	—
2007–08	EV Zug	NLA	10	0	0	0	35	7	0	0	0	8
2008–09	Dinamo Rīga	KHL	30	2	3	5	49	—	—	—	—	—
2009–10	Springfield Falcons	AHL	6	0	0	0	19	—	—	—	—	—
AHL totals			155	35	54	89	268	10	2	3	5	25
NHL totals			342	41	51	92	429	3	0	0	0	2

=== International ===
Year	Team	Event	GP	G	A	Pts	PIM
1994	Slovakia	EJC C	6	11	6	17	4
2000	Slovakia	WC	2	0	0	0	0
2004	Slovakia	WC	9	1	0	1	10
2006	Slovakia	OG	6	1	0	1	2
Senior totals			17	2	0	2	12

== Awards and achievements ==
- Named to the WHL East Second All-Star Team in 1998
