= Viesturs Koziols =

- Born: 24 August 1963 (age 62); Riga, Soviet Union
- Occupations: Partner, CEO at SIA Laifholding
- Children: Līva Koziola (1988), Ulla Krūmiņa (1992), Kristofers Koziols (2010), Emīlija Koziola (2012)

Viesturs Koziols (born 24 August 1963 in Riga, Soviet-occupied Latvia) is a Latvian businessman. He is also the Chairman of the Board of the NGO Viena Diena.lv and currently serves as Vice-President and Board Member of the Latvian Ice Hockey Federation. September 2021 Koziols was elected as a Council member of the International Ice Hockey Federation. He is known for his contributions to Latvian visual culture, photography, and international cooperation, as well as for his long-standing involvement in business development and sports administration.

== Early life and education ==
After graduating from Faculty of Geography at the University of Latvia in 1986, Viesturs Koziols began working as a commercial manager of the newspaper Atmoda. Koziols was involved in the Latvian independence movement; he was among the organizers of the Baltic Way and joined the Popular Front of Latvia.

== Career ==
Since 1996, Viesturs Koziols has worked primarily in real estate development and city planning. He was adviser to both the first and second Prime Ministers of Latvia, Ivars Godmanis and Valdis Birkavs, in the early 1990s. He was also adviser to the Minister of Economics Juris Lujāns.

During 1995–1997 he was project manager at Norwegian retail chain "Varner Baltija" and manager of real estate administration at "Varner Hakon Invest", both ventures of Varner-Gruppen. Koziols was also involved in founding the "Baltic Stability Foundation" to advise investment strategies for Latvia.

From 2001 to 2004 Koziols was elected Chairman of the Council in joint stock company Latvijas Krājbanka.

Viesturs Koziols founded the non-governmental youth organization Avantis.

In 2006 his company "Žurnāls" Ltd. began publishing a weekly magazine, Republika.lv and he was among staff photographers. In 2007, together with photographer Ilmārs Znotiņš, he opened the photography studio "Imagine".

In 2008 Viesturs Koziols became Chairman of the Board of Kontinental Hockey League (KHL) ice hockey club Dinamo Riga.

In 2009 he became freelance adviser in fields of youth work to Ministry of the Interior Affairs Linda Mūrniece.

Together with his business partner from Norway Tormod Stene-Johansen in 2012, he established holding structure Latvian Development Fund (LDF).

In October 2016 he was elected in Board of Latvian Hockey Federation and appointed as the Vice-President and General Secretary of the Latvian Ice hockey federation.

In September 2021, during IIHF ( International Ice Hockey Federation ) semi-annual congress, he was elected as a Council member. The council appointed Mr. Koziols as a Chairman of IIHF Facilities Committee.

In December 2021 he left the position of General Secretary of Latvian Hockey Federation.

== Photography ==
On 31 August 2007, Viesturs Koziols together with Ilmārs Znotiņš, Jānis Krūmiņš, Gunārs Janaitis organized the national photo project “One Day in Latvia - 20 Years Later.”

As Chairman of the association Viena Diena.lv, Viesturs Koziols organized the conference “Vision & Voices 2025: Photography for a Connected World,” held on 29 August 2025 at the Great Amber Concert Hall in Liepāja.,

Koziols organized a solo exhibition by American photojournalist David Burnett at the Ola Foundation cultural space in Riga on 1 September 2025.

== Adventurer ==
In 1999, together with Vilis Dambiņš and Gunārs Dukšte, Viesturs Koziols reached the North Pole in a hot air balloon.

Together with his daughter Līva Koziola he climbed Mount Kilimanjaro in 2000. In 2013 climbed the Himalayas mountains in Bhutan.
