= Juris Upītis =

Latvian ice hockey player (born 1991)

- Born: June 16, 1991 (age 35) Riga, Latvian SSR, Soviet Union
- Height: 5 ft 9 in (175 cm)
- Weight: 172 lb (78 kg; 12 st 4 lb)
- Position: Left wing/Centre
- Catches: Right
- FFHG Division 1 team Former teams: Corsaires de Dunkerque; HK Liepājas Metalurgs; HK Riga; Dinamo Riga; Yermak Angarsk; MHC Martin; Edinburgh Capitals; HK Kurbads; Hochstadter EC; HK Prizma Riga
- National team: Latvia
- Playing career: 2009–present

Juris Upītis (born June 16, 1991) is a Latvian ice hockey player. He was also a part of Latvian national junior team.

On October 30, 2011, due to injury of Jamie Lundmark Upītis was called to Dinamo Riga of the Kontinental Hockey League. On his debut against Metallurg Magnitogorsk he scored his first KHL goal, a second period equalizer, the regulation ended at 1-1. Dinamo won the game in shootout.

After spells with HK Kurbads in Latvia and MHC Martin in Slovakia, Upitis moved to the UK to sign for the Edinburgh Capitals in August 2017.

== Career statistics ==
=== Regular season and playoffs ===
			Regular season					Playoffs
Season	Team	League	GP	G	A	Pts	PIM	GP	G	A	Pts	PIM
2006–07	Prizma Riga U18	LHL U18	—	5	6	11	20	—	—	—	—	—
2007–08	SK Riga 18	LHL 2	16	2	9	11	28	—	—	—	—	—
2007–08	SK Riga 18	LHL U18	30	26	27	53	38	—	—	—	—	—
2008–09	SK LSPA/Riga	LHL	28	10	24	34	24	—	—	—	—	—
2009–10	Dinamo-Juniors Riga	BXL	47	6	10	16	12	—	—	—	—	—
2010–11	HK Riga	MHL	55	24	26	50	34	2	0	0	0	0
2011–12	Dinamo Riga	KHL	9	3	0	3	2	2	0	0	0	0
2011–12	Liepājas Metalurgs	BXL	20	6	8	14	10	—	—	—	—	—
2011–12	HK Riga	MHL	22	7	10	17	26	5	2	4	6	0
2011–12	HK Juniors Riga	LHL	—	—	—	—	—	2	0	1	1	0
2012–13	Dinamo Riga	KHL	3	0	0	0	0	—	—	—	—	—
2012–13	HK Riga	MHL	58	20	32	52	53	—	—	—	—	—
2013–14	Dinamo Riga	KHL	33	1	3	4	2	6	0	1	1	0
2014–15	Dinamo Riga	KHL	25	1	2	3	2	—	—	—	—	—
2014–15	HK Liepāja	LHL	4	2	1	3	2	—	—	—	—	—
2014–15	Yermak Angarsk	VHL	17	6	6	12	6	2	1	1	2	0
2015–16	Yermak Angarsk	VHL	21	4	9	13	4	—	—	—	—	—
2015–16	Torpedo Ust-Kamenogorsk	VHL	21	3	7	10	12	6	0	0	0	2
2016–17	Sokol Krasnoyarsk	VHL	2	0	0	0	0	—	—	—	—	—
2016–17	HK Kurbads	LHL	11	8	5	13	16	11	2	5	7	2
2016–17	HK Martin	Slovak 1. Liga	2	0	0	0	0	—	—	—	—	—
2017–18	Edinburgh Capitals	EIHL	26	3	9	12	9	—	—	—	—	—
2017–18	HK Kurbads	LHL	9	4	7	11	6	9	1	5	6	2
2018–19	HK Kurbads	LHL	35	18	24	42	43	10	2	7	9	6
2019–20	HK Kurbads	LHL	9	7	3	10	0	—	—	—	—	—
2019–20	Höchstadter EC	Germany3	3	3	2	5	0	14	5	5	10	6
2020–21	HK Prizma Riga	LHL	19	7	1	8	6	—	—	—	—	—
KHL Totals			70	5	5	10	6	8	0	1	1	0
