= Ainārs Podziņš =

Latvian and Russian ice hockey forward (born 1992)

- Born: 16 March 1992 (age 34) Jūrmala, Latvia
- Height: 6 ft 0 in (183 cm)
- Weight: 183 lb (83 kg; 13 st 1 lb)
- Position: Left wing/center
- Shoots: Right
- UHL team Former teams: HC Kramatorsk; PHC Krylya Sovetov; Dinamo Riga; Vityaz Chekhov; Metallurg Novokuznetsk; Edinburgh Capitals; CBR Brave; LHC Les Lions; HK Almaty; HC Donbass
- National team: Latvia
- Playing career: 2009–present

Ainārs Podziņš (Russian: Айнарс Гинтович Подзиньш; born 16 March 1992, in Jūrmala, Latvia) is a Latvian and Russian ice hockey forward, currently playing for HC Kramatorsk of the UHL.

For a longer period of time Podziņš, a native of Latvia, carried a Russian passport and even played for the Russian U17 national team. However, in the summer of 2010, after joining Dinamo Riga, Podziņš managed to regain his Latvian citizenship.

In December 2017, Podziņš signed for the Edinburgh Capitals of the UK EIHL. He has since had spells in Australia, France, Kazakhstan and Ukraine.

== Career statistics ==
=== Regular season and playoffs ===
| | | | Regular season | | | | | Playoffs |
| Season | Team | League | GP | G | A | Pts | PIM | GP | G | A | Pts | PIM |
|---|---|---|---|---|---|---|---|---|---|---|---|---|
| 2008–09 | PHC Krylya Sovetov | RUS–2 | 6 | 0 | 0 | 0 | 2 | — | — | — | — | — |
| 2008–09 | PHC Krylya Sovetov 2 | RUS–2 | 39 | 3 | 5 | 8 | 12 | — | — | — | — | — |
| 2009–10 | PHC Krylya Sovetov | RUS–3 | 53 | 13 | 11 | 24 | 38 | — | — | — | — | — |
| 2010–11 | Dinamo Riga | KHL | 19 | 1 | 0 | 1 | 6 | 11 | 0 | 1 | 1 | 6 |
| 2010–11 | HK Riga | MHL | 17 | 2 | 6 | 8 | 16 | — | — | — | — | — |
| 2011–12 | Dinamo Riga | KHL | 38 | 4 | 0 | 4 | 21 | 4 | 0 | 0 | 0 | 2 |
| 2011–12 | HK Riga | MHL | 7 | 2 | 1 | 3 | 2 | — | — | — | — | — |
| 2011–12 | HK Juniors | LHL | — | — | — | — | — | 5 | 0 | 0 | 0 | 0 |
| 2012–13 | HK Riga | MHL | 5 | 0 | 2 | 2 | 2 | — | — | — | — | — |
| 2012–13 | Metalurgs Liepaja | BXL | 22 | 6 | 6 | 12 | 2 | — | — | — | — | — |
| 2012–13 | Vityaz Chekhov | KHL | 13 | 1 | 3 | 4 | 4 | — | — | — | — | — |
| 2012–13 | Russkie Vityazi Chekhov | MHL | 8 | 3 | 3 | 6 | 0 | — | — | — | — | — |
| 2013–14 | Vityaz Podolsk | KHL | 11 | 0 | 2 | 2 | 0 | — | — | — | — | — |
| 2013–14 | Titan Klin | VHL | 12 | 0 | 0 | 0 | 0 | — | — | — | — | — |
| 2014–15 | HC Kuban | VHL | 2 | 0 | 0 | 0 | 0 | — | — | — | — | — |
| 2014–15 | HK Martin | SVK1 | 14 | 3 | 5 | 8 | 2 | 3 | 0 | 0 | 0 | 2 |
| 2015–16 | Sokol Krasnoyarsk | VHL | 44 | 4 | 7 | 11 | 38 | — | — | — | — | — |
| 2016–17 | EHC Bayreuth | DEL2 | 4 | 1 | 2 | 3 | 0 | — | — | — | — | — |
| 2016–17 | EC Kitzbühel | AlpsHL | 12 | 7 | 5 | 12 | 2 | — | — | — | — | — |
| 2016–17 | Iisalmen Peli-Karhut | Mestis | 7 | 5 | 2 | 7 | 25 | 8 | 3 | 4 | 7 | 4 |
| 2017–18 | Metallurg Novokuznetsk | VHL | 13 | 0 | 1 | 1 | 6 | — | — | — | — | — |
| 2017–18 | Edinburgh Capitals | EIHL | 32 | 12 | 8 | 20 | 18 | — | — | — | — | — |
| 2018 | CBR Brave | AIHL | 17 | 16 | 19 | 35 | 22 | — | — | — | — | — |
| 2018–19 | LHC Les Lions | Ligue Magnus | 15 | 1 | 4 | 5 | 14 | — | — | — | — | — |
| 2018–19 | HC Almaty | KAZ | 7 | 0 | 3 | 3 | 14 | 1 | 0 | 0 | 0 | 0 |
| 2019–20 | HC Donbass | UHL | 30 | 18 | 16 | 34 | 18 | 2 | 0 | 0 | 0 | 2 |
| 2020–21 | HC Donbass | UHL | 1 | 0 | 0 | 0 | 0 | — | — | — | — | — |
| 2020–21 | HC Kramatorsk | UHL | 26 | 5 | 8 | 13 | 36 | 3 | 2 | 0 | 2 | 4 |
| KHL totals | | | 19 | 1 | 0 | 1 | 6 | 11 | 0 | 1 | 1 | 6 |
