= Filip Novák (ice hockey) =

Czech ice hockey player

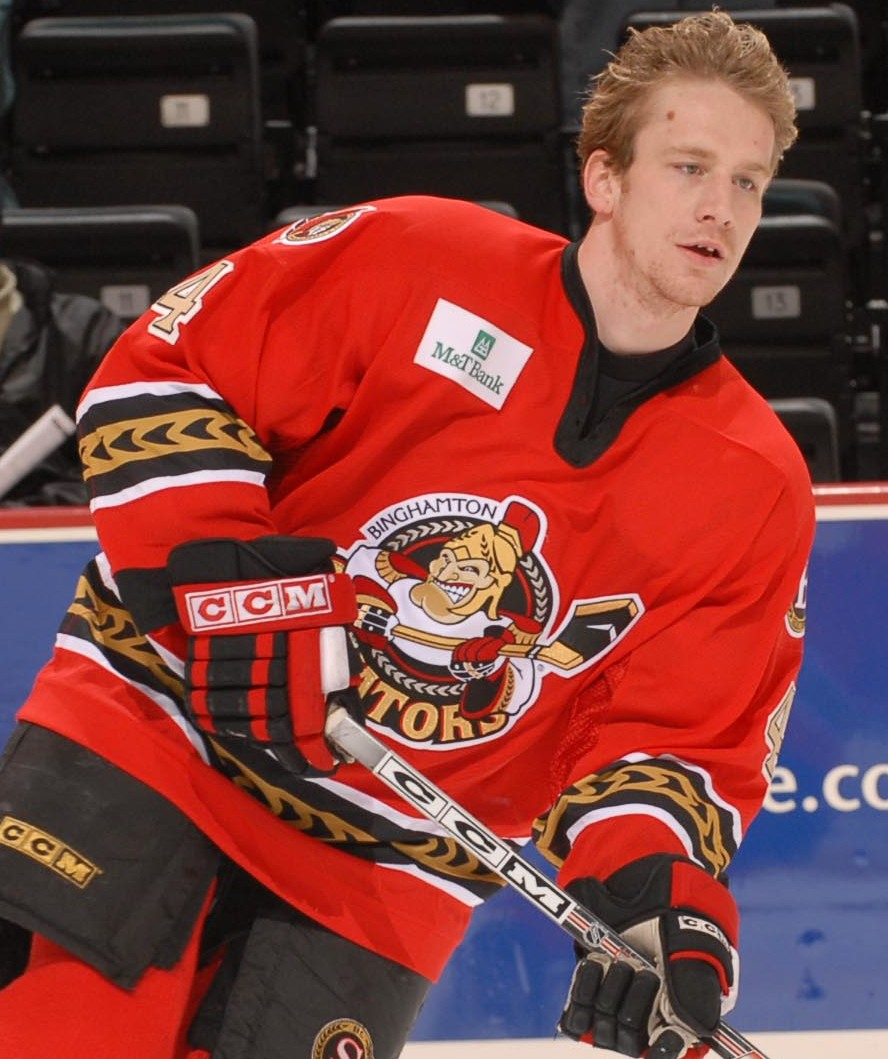
- Novák with the Binghamton Senators in 2006
- Born: May 7, 1982 (age 43) České Budějovice, Czechoslovakia
- Height: 6 ft 0 in (183 cm)
- Weight: 203 lb (92 kg; 14 st 7 lb)
- Position: Defence
- Shot: Left
- KHL team Former teams: Traktor Chelyabinsk; Ottawa Senators; Columbus Blue Jackets; HC Ceské Budejovice; Dinamo Riga; HC MVD; Dynamo Moscow; HC Slovan Bratislava
- National team: Czech Republic
- NHL draft: 64th overall, 2000; New York Rangers
- Playing career: 2002–2018

Filip Novák (born May 7, 1982) is a Czech former professional ice hockey player. Novak last played for Traktor Chelyabinsk in the Kontinental Hockey League (KHL). He has won the Gagarin Cup twice with Dynamo Moscow in 2012 and 2013.

== Playing career ==
Novák played junior hockey with HC Budejovice in his native Czech Republic and with the Regina Pats of the Western Hockey League before he was drafted by the New York Rangers in the second round (64th overall) of the 2000 NHL entry draft. After being drafted, he spent a two further seasons with Regina.

On March 8, 2002, he was part of a blockbuster trade that sent Novák, Igor Ulanov, a first-round selection in the 2002 NHL entry draft (later traded to Calgary Flames - Eric Nystrom), a second-round selection in the 2002 NHL entry draft (Rob Globke) and a fourth-round selection in the 2003 NHL entry draft to the Florida Panthers for Pavel Bure and a second-round selection in the 2002 NHL entry draft (Lee Falardeau). Nearing the end of the season, he sustained a serious injury that kept him off the ice until late 2004, when he played with the San Antonio Rampage of the American Hockey League.

Just prior to the start of the 2005–06 NHL season, Novák was traded to the Ottawa Senators for a sixth-round selection in the 2007 NHL entry draft. On August 8, 2006, Novák signed with the Columbus Blue Jackets as an unrestricted free agent.

On May 1, 2014, Novak was signed to a two-year contract extension to remain with Dynamo Moscow.

During his first season with HC Slovan Bratislava in 2015–16, Novak was traded after just 16 games with the club, remaining in the KHL with Russian club, Traktor Chelyabinsk on October 16, 2015.

== Career statistics ==
=== Regular season and playoffs ===
			Regular season					Playoffs
Season	Team	League	GP	G	A	Pts	PIM	GP	G	A	Pts	PIM
1998–99	HC České Budějovice	CZE U20	68	8	10	18	43	—	—	—	—	—
1999–2000	Regina Pats	WHL	47	7	32	39	70	7	1	4	5	5
2000–01	Regina Pats	WHL	64	17	50	67	75	6	1	4	5	6
2001–02	Regina Pats	WHL	60	12	46	58	125	6	2	2	4	19
2002–03	San Antonio Rampage	AHL	57	10	17	27	79	1	0	0	0	0
2004–05	San Antonio Rampage	AHL	71	1	12	13	84	—	—	—	—	—
2005–06	Binghamton Senators	AHL	64	8	44	52	58	—	—	—	—	—
2005–06	Ottawa Senators	NHL	11	0	0	0	4	—	—	—	—	—
2006–07	Syracuse Crunch	AHL	67	5	32	37	92	—	—	—	—	—
2006–07	Columbus Blue Jackets	NHL	6	0	0	0	2	—	—	—	—	—
2007–08	HC Mountfield	ELH	45	2	2	4	50	12	0	0	0	29
2008–09	Dinamo Riga	KHL	50	4	14	18	85	3	0	1	1	14
2009–10	HC MVD	KHL	52	2	22	24	124	21	2	8	10	30
2010–11	Dynamo Moscow	KHL	25	2	6	8	30	—	—	—	—	—
2011–12	Dynamo Moscow	KHL	39	2	9	11	46	19	2	4	6	16
2012–13	Dynamo Moscow	KHL	42	4	15	19	71	15	1	3	4	6
2013–14	Dynamo Moscow	KHL	29	2	14	16	51	7	0	0	0	4
2014–15	Dynamo Moscow	KHL	32	3	11	14	18	11	0	4	4	12
2015–16	HC Slovan Bratislava	KHL	16	1	1	2	12	—	—	—	—	—
2015–16	Traktor Chelyabinsk	KHL	35	4	6	10	48	—	—	—	—	—
2016–17	HC Dynamo Pardubice	ELH	9	1	2	3	8	—	—	—	—	—
2016–17	HC Slovan Bratislava	KHL	11	0	3	3	24	—	—	—	—	—
2016–17	ČEZ Motor České Budějovice	CZE.2	14	2	4	6	14	9	1	7	8	31
2017–18	ČEZ Motor České Budějovice	CZE.2	34	2	9	11	52	9	0	3	3	62
AHL totals			259	24	105	129	313	1	0	0	0	0
NHL totals			17	0	0	0	6	—	—	—	—	—
KHL totals			331	24	101	125	509	76	5	20	25	82

=== International ===
Year	Team	Event	Result	GP	G	A	Pts	PIM
1999	Czech Republic	WJC18	5th	7	1	2	3	4
2002	Czech Republic	WJC	7th	7	0	2	2	4
2010	Czech Republic	WC	1st place, gold medalist(s)	3	0	1	1	4
Junior totals				14	1	4	5	8
Senior totals				3	0	1	1	4

== Awards and honors ==
Award	Year
WHL
East Second Team All-Star	2001
East First All-Star Team	2002
