= Hockey Europe =

Collaboration of European ice hockey leagues

Hockey Europe is a collaboration of ice hockey leagues within Europe. It was formed by six European Leagues to help negotiate for their rights with the NHL and KHL.

== History ==
Hockey Europe was founded in 2008 (17 years ago) by six European hockey leagues to promote cooperation, amicable relations, and unity of these leagues and their member clubs in the middle of the heavy heated competition between then newly launched Russian ice hockey league KHL and the North American NHL.

Hockey Europe will furthermore concentrate to help the six founding members and possible new members to promote and improve professional ice hockey competitions in all its aspects and safeguard the general interests of its members and European ice hockey as a whole. An improvement for Hockey Europe is in the exchange of information and promotion the cooperation and relations of its members with the National Hockey League, USA/Canada (NHL), Kontinental Hockey League, Russia (KHL) and other sports institutions or other professional ice hockey leagues and the clubs, as well as with the International Ice Hockey Federation (IIHF) and its National Member Associations.

The president and voluntary general manager of Hockey Europe is the league manager of the Erste Bank Hockey League, Christian Feichtinger. Hockey Europe has its registered office in Cologne, Germany, and is governed by EU law as a European Economic Interest Group.

== Members ==
Hockey Europe has 6 full and 1 associated members:

Full Members

- Finland - SM-liiga
- Slovakia - Slovak Extraliga
- Sweden - Swedish Hockey League
- Czech Republic - Czech Extraliga
- Germany - Deutsche Eishockey Liga
- Austria - ICE Hockey League (with clubs from the Czech Republic, Hungary, Italy and Slovenia)

Associate Member

- Switzerland - National League A

== See also ==
- International Ice Hockey Federation
