= Gunārs Skvorcovs =

Latvian ice hockey player

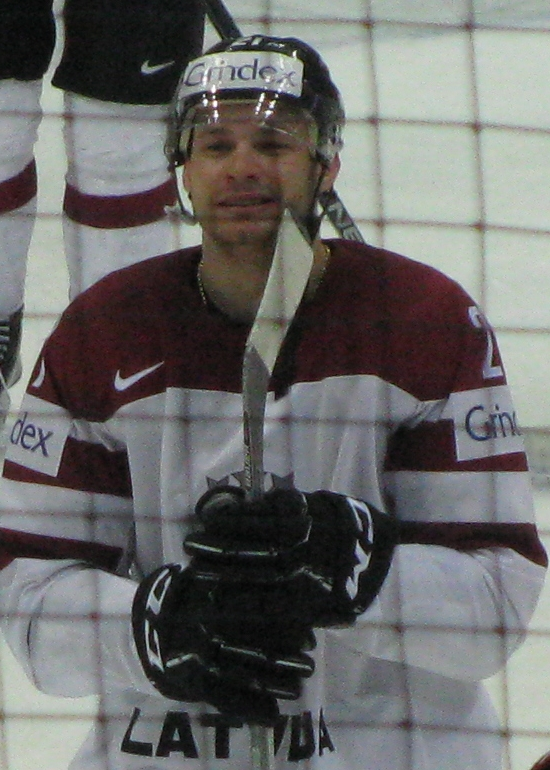
- Born: 13 January 1990 (age 35); Saldus, Latvian SSR, Soviet Union
- Height: 6 ft 1 in (185 cm)
- Weight: 190 lb (86 kg; 13 st 8 lb)
- Position: Right wing
- Shoots: Left
- KHL team Former teams: Dinamo Riga; SK LSPA/Riga; HK Metalurgs Liepaja; Kunlun Red Star
- National team: Latvia
- Playing career: 2004–present

Gunārs Skvorcovs (born 13 January 1990) is a Latvian ice hockey right winger, currently playing for Odense Bulldogs.

== Playing career ==
Skvorcovs made his debut for Metalurgs already in 2004-05, when he was only fourteen years old and continued to play in the club system for eight seasons. When in 2012-13 season Liepājas Metalurgs became affiliate of Dinamo Riga of KHL, Svorcovs made his debut in KHL. Eventually he split season between Dinamo and Metalurgs.

== International play ==
Skvorcovs has played for Latvian national team in the 2008 U18 championship, as well as three World Juniors Championships.
