= Jānis Sprukts =

Latvian ice hockey player

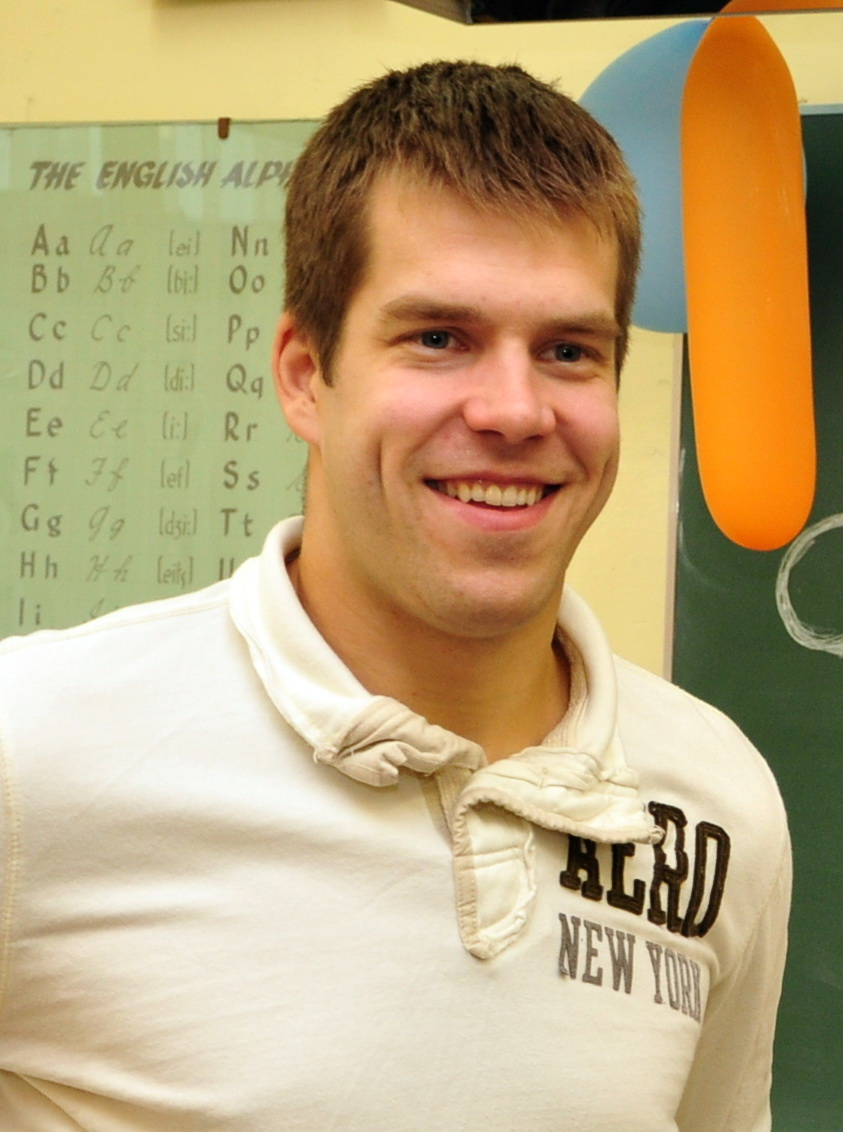
- Born: January 31, 1982 (age 44) Riga, Latvian SSR, Soviet Union
- Height: 6 ft 3 in (191 cm)
- Weight: 225 lb (102 kg; 16 st 1 lb)
- Position: Forward
- Shot: Left
- LHHL team Former teams: HK Kurbads; Lukko; HPK; Florida Panthers; Dinamo Riga; HC CSKA Moscow; Lokomotiv Yaroslavl; HC Fribourg-Gottéron
- National team: Latvia
- NHL draft: 234th overall, 2000; Florida Panthers
- Playing career: 1999–2020

Jānis Sprukts (born January 31, 1982) is a retired Latvian professional ice hockey forward.

== Biography ==
As a youth, Sprukts played in the 1996 Quebec International Pee-Wee Hockey Tournament with a team from Riga. He was drafted by Panthers as their eighth-round pick, #234 overall, in the 2000 NHL entry draft.

Sprukts has played two seasons of hockey in North America, then three seasons in Europe with Odense Bulldogs, ASK/Ogre, HK Rīga 2000, HPK. In 2006, he returned to North America, where he signed with the Florida Panthers. He started the 2006/2007 season in Panthers farmclub American Hockey League team Rochester Americans. In October 2006, after 4 games in AHL, he was called up to the Florida Panthers. On 20 October he played his first NHL game against the Philadelphia Flyers, but on 21 December, playing against the New York Rangers, recorded his first point in the NHL. On April 6, 2007, Jānis scored his first career NHL goal against Marc Denis and the Tampa Bay Lightning in a Panthers 7-2 victory. In 2009, he left North America and then played in the KHL for Dinamo Riga and CSKA Moscow.

== Career statistics ==
=== Regular season and playoffs ===
			Regular season					Playoffs
Season	Team	League	GP	G	A	Pts	PIM	GP	G	A	Pts	PIM
1999–2000	Juniors Rīga	LAT	3	0	1	1	2	—	—	—	—	—
1999–2000	Juniors Rīga	EEHL B	2	4	4	8	0	—	—	—	—	—
1999–2000	Lukko	FIN U20	26	2	5	7	6	3	0	0	0	0
2000–01	Lukko	FIN U20	36	15	22	37	24	3	0	0	0	0
2000–01	Lukko	SM-liiga	9	0	0	0	2	—	—	—	—	—
2001–02	Acadie–Bathurst Titan	QMJHL	63	35	44	79	46	10	10	6	16	10
2002–03	Sport	Mestis	21	5	6	11	8	—	—	—	—	—
2002–03	Acadie–Bathurst Titan	QMJHL	30	9	29	38	12	11	3	5	8	0
2003–04	ASK/Ogre	LAT	21	8	5	13	24	—	—	—	—	—
2003–04	Odense Bulldogs	DEN	2	0	1	1	2	13	7	4	11	36
2004–05	HK Rīga 2000	BLR	21	7	9	16	10	3	0	0	0	2
2005–06	HPK	SM-liiga	35	18	10	28	14	13	3	4	7	14
2006–07	Rochester Americans	AHL	55	17	37	54	58	—	—	—	—	—
2006–07	Florida Panthers	NHL	13	1	2	3	2	—	—	—	—	—
2007–08	Lukko	SM-liiga	53	12	17	29	20	3	0	1	1	0
2008–09	Rochester Americans	AHL	59	16	31	47	20	—	—	—	—	—
2008–09	Florida Panthers	NHL	1	0	0	0	0	—	—	—	—	—
2009–10	Dinamo Rīga	KHL	53	11	25	36	34	9	1	4	5	10
2010–11	Dinamo Rīga	KHL	53	10	16	26	52	11	4	1	5	6
2011–12	Dinamo Rīga	KHL	53	11	24	35	28	7	5	3	8	0
2012–13	CSKA Moscow	KHL	50	5	3	8	6	9	0	1	1	0
2013–14	Lokomotiv Yaroslavl	KHL	14	2	5	7	0	18	0	4	4	6
2014–15	Lokomotiv Yaroslavl	KHL	16	1	4	5	4	—	—	—	—	—
2014–15	HC Fribourg–Gottéron	NLA	7	1	1	2	0	—	—	—	—	—
2014–15	HC Red Ice	SUI-2	1	0	1	1	2	—	—	—	—	—
2015–16	MHC Mountfield Martin	SVK	12	3	3	6	4	4	0	1	1	0
2016–17	Ritten Sport	ALP	17	5	7	12	8	12	5	7	12	6
2016–17	Ritten Sport	ITA	2	0	2	2	0	—	—	—	—	—
2017–18	HK Kurbads	LAT	22	12	12	24	18	9	3	6	9	6
2018–19	HK Kurbads	LAT	35	11	30	41	18	10	3	8	11	8
2019–20	HK Kurbads	LAT	33	6	22	28	8	—	—	—	—	—
NHL totals			14	1	2	3	2	—	—	—	—	—
KHL totals			239	40	77	117	124	54	10	13	23	22

=== International ===
Year	Team	Event	GP	G	A	Pts	PIM
1999	Latvia	EJC D1	4	7	5	12	0
2000	Latvia	WJC B	5	0	1	1	2
2000	Latvia	WJC18 B	5	5	1	6	14
2000	Latvia	WC	7	0	0	0	0
2001	Latvia	WJC D1	5	1	4	5	0
2002	Latvia	WJC D2	4	2	3	5	0
2003	Latvia	WC	6	0	2	2	2
2005	Latvia	WC	6	2	1	3	0
2006	Latvia	WC	6	0	1	1	2
2007	Latvia	WC	3	0	2	2	0
2008	Latvia	WC	6	0	2	2	2
2009	Latvia	WC	7	0	1	1	0
2010	Latvia	OLY	4	0	1	1	0
2010	Latvia	WC	6	2	3	5	2
2012	Latvia	WC	7	0	4	4	2
2013	Latvia	WC	7	1	5	6	2
2014	Latvia	OLY	5	2	2	4	0
2015	Latvia	WC	7	0	1	1	25
2017	Latvia	WC	6	2	1	3	6
Junior totals			23	15	14	29	16
Senior totals			83	9	26	35	43
