= Daniel Sperrle =

Swedish ice hockey player

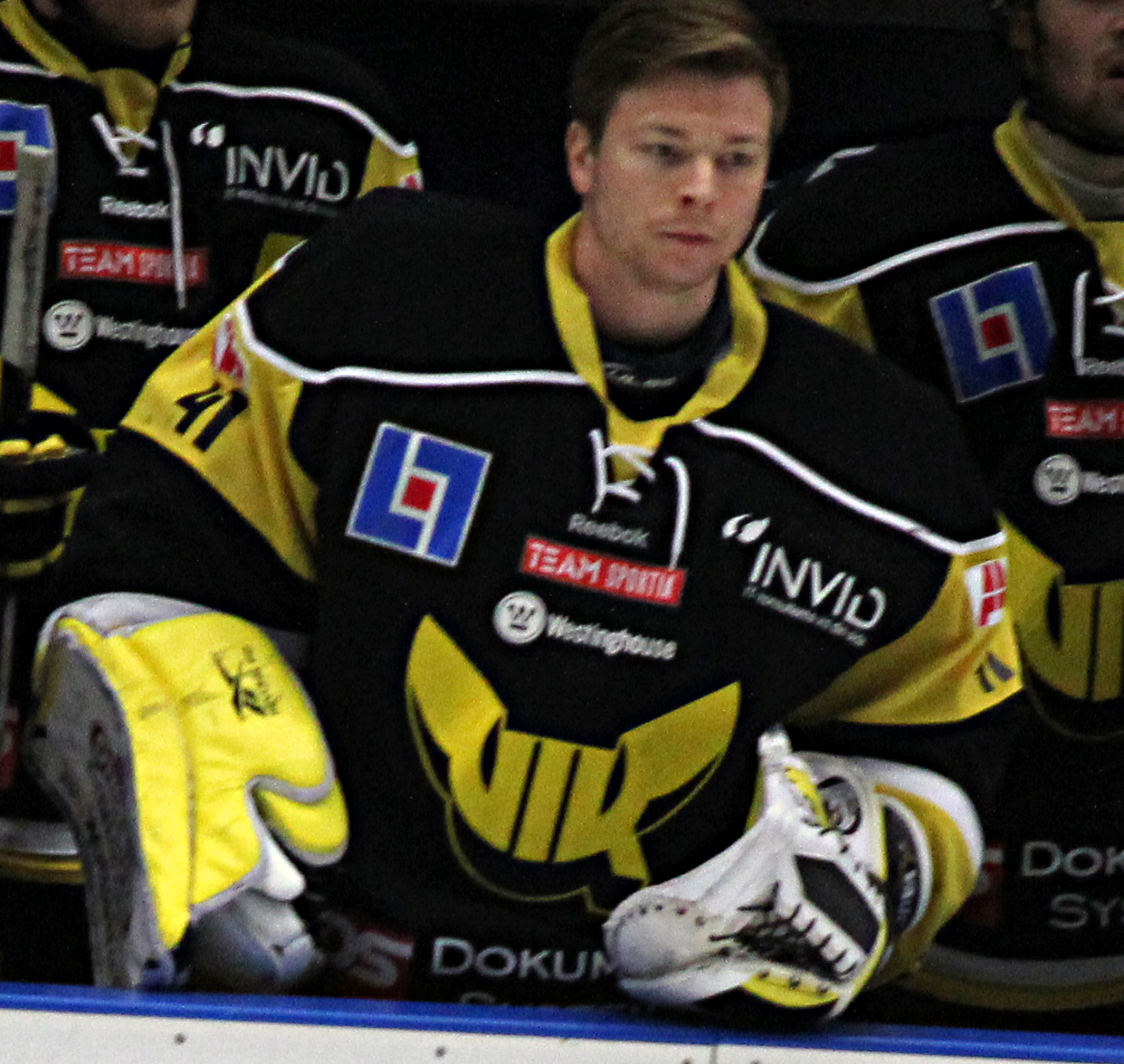
- Daniel Sperrle
- Born: October 7, 1982 (age 42); Sundbyberg, Sweden
- Height: 5 ft 10 in (178 cm)
- Weight: 170 lb (77 kg; 12 st 2 lb)
- Position: Goaltender
- Caught: Left
- Played for: EfB Ishockey; VIK Västerås HK; Molot Prikamie-Perm; HC Dmitrov; Dinamo Riga; Linköping HC; AIK; Mora IK; Brynäs IF; Leksands IF
- Playing career: 1999–present

Daniel Sperrle (born 7 October 1982 in Sundbyberg, Sweden) is a Swedish professional ice hockey goaltender, who played for Dinamo Riga.

== Career ==
Sperrle played 5 games in the Kontinental Hockey League for the Dinamo Riga. He was last playing with EfB Ishockey in Denmark.

He currently has the modern time world record for clean sheets with 390 minutes and 12 seconds. Sperrle took the record from Brian Boucher in 2009. Bouchers record was 332 minutes.
