= Maksims Širokovs =

Latvian ice hockey player

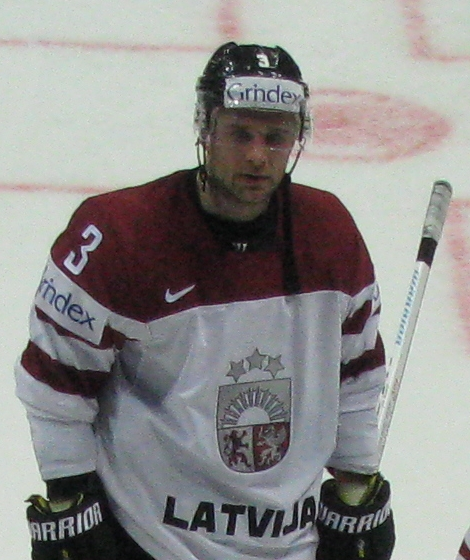
- Born: December 13, 1982 (age 43) Riga, Latvian SSR, Soviet Union
- Height: 181 cm (5 ft 11 in)
- Weight: 87 kg (192 lb; 13 st 10 lb)
- Position: Defence
- Shoots: Right
- OHL team Former teams: Prizma Riga; Liepājas Metalurgs; ASK/Zemgale; Riga 2000; Dinamo Riga; Nitra; Arlan Kokshetau; Levy Lviv; Sterzing/Vipiteno; Neman Grodno; Pustertal Wölfe; ASC Corona 2010 Brașov; Olimp/Venta 2002; Tartu Välk 494
- National team: Latvia
- Playing career: 2001–present

Maksims Širokovs (born December 13, 1982) is a Latvian professional ice hockey player for Prizma Riga of the Latvian Hockey Higher League. He is the younger brother of Aleksejs Širokovs.

== Playing career ==
Širokovs started his professional career with Liepājas Metalurgs in Latvia. He has represented the Latvian national team in various tournaments.
