= Ervīns Muštukovs =

Latvian ice hockey player

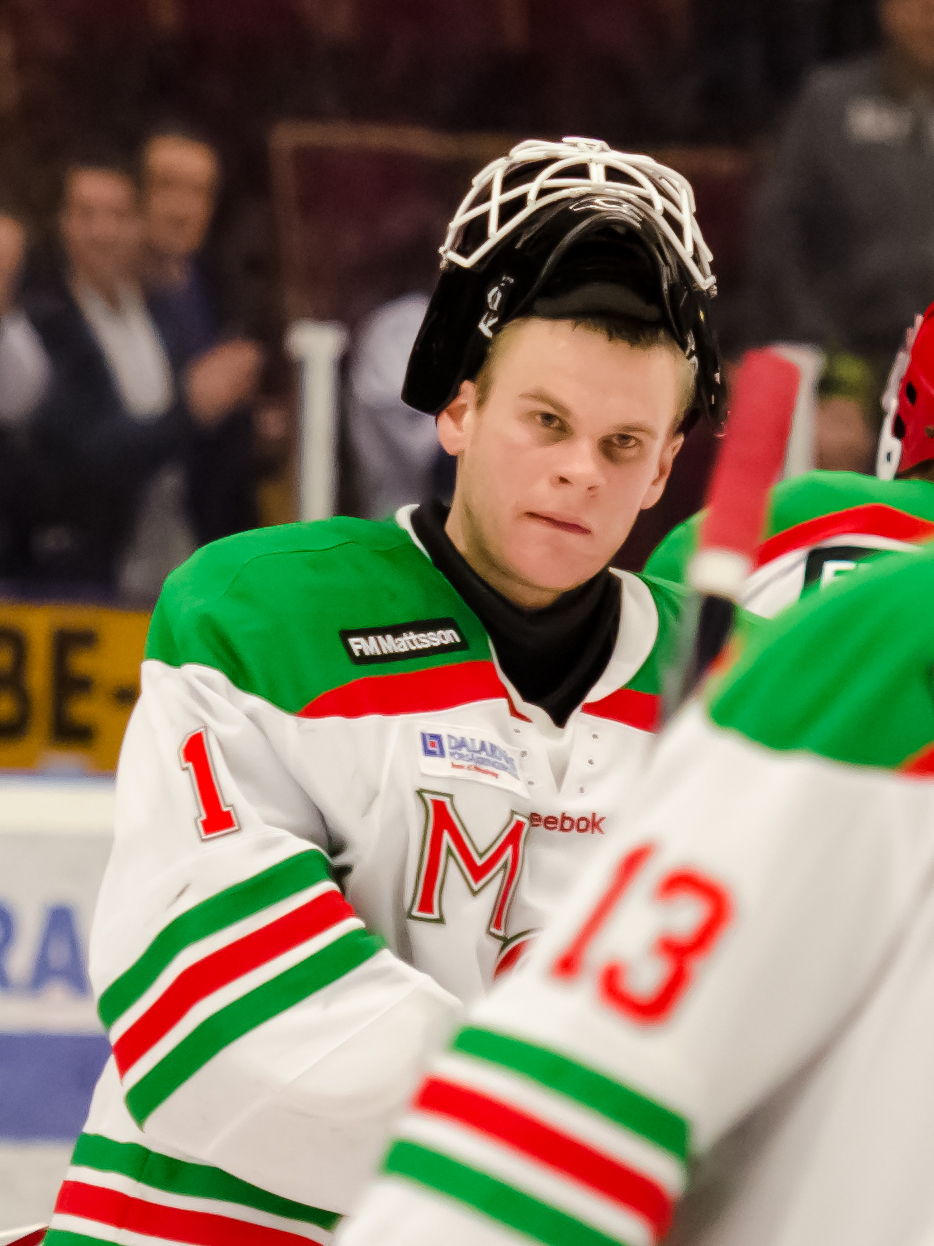
- Born: 7 April 1984 (age 41) Riga, Latvian SSR, Soviet Union
- Height: 6 ft 1 in (185 cm)
- Weight: 187 lb (85 kg; 13 st 5 lb)
- Position: Goaltender
- Caught: Left
- Czech2 team Former teams: HC RT Torax Poruba; Odense Bulldogs; HK Nik's Brih Riga; Liepājas Metalurgs; Knoxville Ice Bears; Toledo Storm; Elmira Jackals; HK Riga 2000; Dinamo Riga; Dinamo-Juniors Riga; Sheffield Steelers; Mora IK; Aalborg Pirates; Nice HCA; Scorpions de Mulhouse; Olimp Riga
- National team: Latvia
- Playing career: 2003–present

Ervīns Muštukovs (born 7 April 1984) is a Latvian professional ice hockey goaltender. He plays for HC RT Torax Poruba in the Czech2.

== Career ==
He has played for Drummondville Voltigeurs in the QMJHL, the Knoxville Ice Bears in the SPHL, the Toledo Storm and the Elmira Jackals in the ECHL. He has played for Dinamo Riga in the Kontinental Hockey League. He was also a backup for the Latvian National Team at the 2010 Winter Olympic Hockey Tournament. He signed to play for the Sheffield Steelers of the United Kingdom's Elite Ice Hockey League in 2010–2011, where his performances helped the team win the Elite League Title again. He was also a part of the Elite League Select team that played the Boston Bruins in an exhibition game at the Odyssey Arena in Belfast. After a superb season in Sheffield, where he broke the record for the most number of shutouts in a season, Ervins decided to move on and has signed for the Odense Bulldogs of the Danish Ice Hockey League for the 2011–12 season.

Ervins rejoined the Sheffield Steelers for the 2016–17 season, departing for a second time in 2018. He has since had spells in France with Nice hockey Côte d'Azur and Scorpions de Mulhouse, before returning to Latvia to sign for Olimp Riga.

== Achievements ==
- Latvian League Top Goalie 02/03
- QMJHL Player of the Week (16 Nov) 03/04
- SPHL Player of the Week 06/07
- ECHL Player of the Week (31 Jan) 06/07
- EIHL Player of the Month (September) 10/11
- EIHL Player of the Week (x2) 10/11
- EIHL Most Shutouts in a Season 10/11
- EIHL First All-Star Team 10/11
- EIHL Champion Sheffield Steelers 10/11
- EIHL Best SVS % (92.2) 10/11
- EIHL Most wins (46) 10/11
- EIHL Best Goalie award 10/11
- EIHL Play-Off Champion Sheffield Steelers 16/17
- EIHL Best SVS % (.913) 16/17
- EIHL Player of the Week (x2) 17/18
