= Ronalds Cinks =

Latvian ice hockey player (born 1990)

- Born: March 11, 1990 (age 36) Riga, Latvian SSR, Soviet Union
- Height: 6 ft 0 in (183 cm)
- Weight: 181 lb (82 kg; 12 st 13 lb)
- Position: Forward
- Shot: Right
- Played for: Mississauga Reps; HK Riga 2000; Dinamo Riga; MHK Krylia Sovetov; HK Kurbads; HK Mogo
- Playing career: 2006–2019

Ronalds Cinks (born 11 March 1990) is a retired Latvian professional ice hockey player who played for Dinamo Riga in the KHL and represented Latvia as a junior four times. He most recently played for HK Mogo of the Latvian Hockey Higher League.
