= Sergejs Naumovs =

Latvian ice hockey player

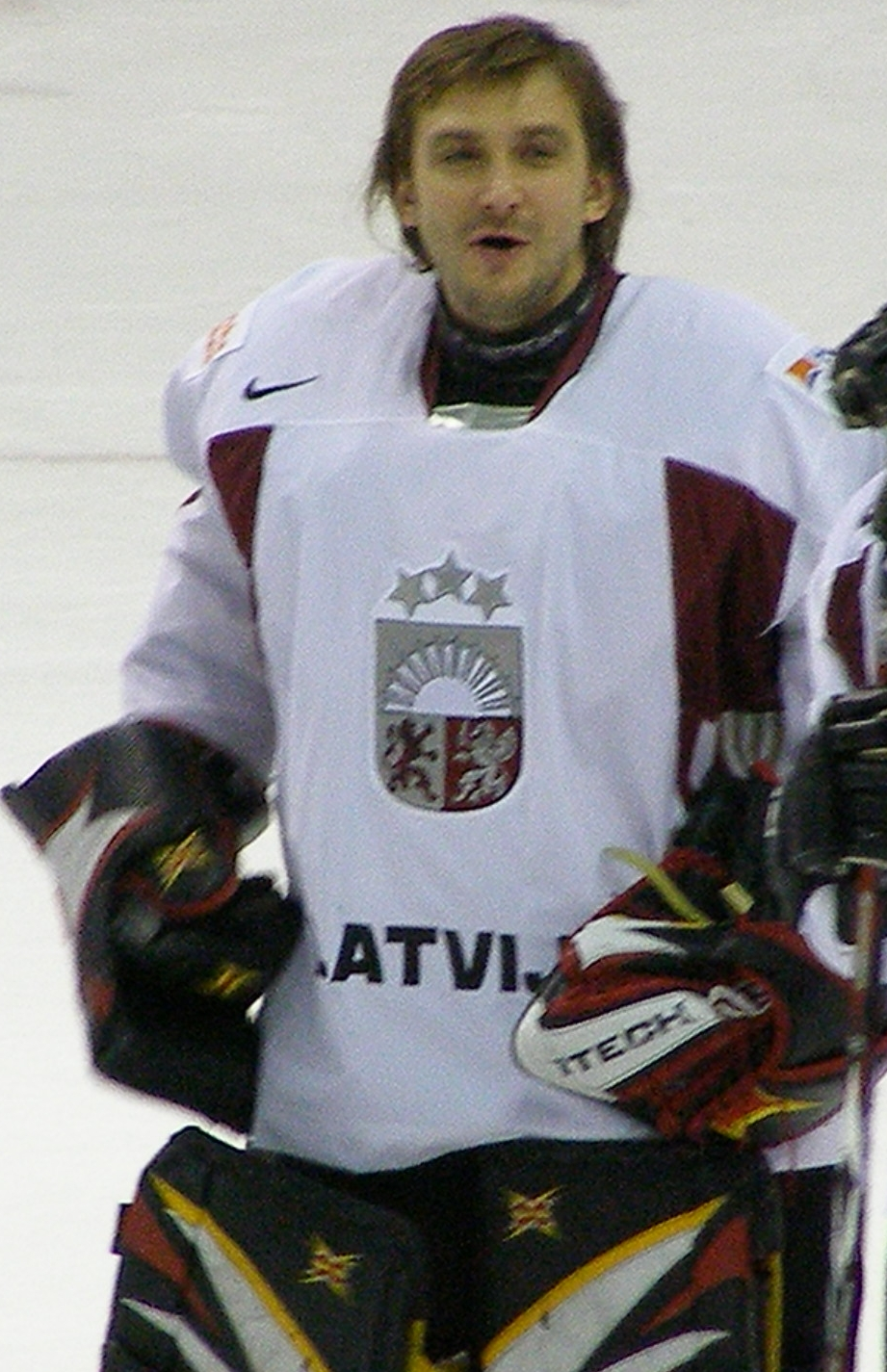
- Born: April 4, 1969 (age 56) Riga, Latvian SSR, Soviet Union
- Height: 5 ft 10 in (178 cm)
- Weight: 175 lb (79 kg; 12 st 7 lb)
- Position: Goaltender
- Caught: Left
- Played for: Dinamo Riga; CSKA Moskva; HK Pardaugava Riga; Leksands IF; Djurgårdens IF; SKA St. Petersburg; Severstal Cherepovets; Salavat Yulayev Ufa; Vityaz Podolsk; Khimik Voskresensk; Torpedo Nizhny Novgorod; HC Bolzano; HK Gomel; Dinamo Riga
- National team: Latvia
- Playing career: 1986–2010

Sergejs Ivanovich Naumovs (born 4 April 1969 in Riga, Soviet Union) is a Latvian former professional ice hockey goaltender.

Naumovs began his career with Dinamo Riga in the Soviet League. In 1994, he moved to North America and had spells with the Oklahoma City Blazers, San Diego Gulls, Las Vegas Thunder and the Long Beach Ice Dogs. He moved to Sweden's Elitserien with Leksands IF in 2000 before moving back to America with the Greensboro Generals. The next season, he returned to Sweden, signing with Djurgårdens IF Hockey. He then played for various Russian teams from 2002 to 2006 before moving to Italy. In 2008, he played for Dinamo Riga in the Kontinental Hockey League.

Currently he is the goaltending coach for the New York Islanders.
