= Toms Hartmanis =

Latvian ice hockey player

- Born: 12 December 1987 (age 38) Liepāja, Latvian SSR, Soviet Union
- Height: 6 ft 0 in (183 cm)
- Weight: 181 lb (82 kg; 12 st 13 lb)
- Position: RW
- Shoots: Left
- team Former teams: Braehead Clan; EIHL; Fife Flyers; CHL; Missouri Mavericks; EIHL; Newcastle Vipers; Fife Flyers; HockeyAllsvenskan; Almtuna IS; Belarusian Extraleague; HK Riga 2000
- Playing career: 2005–present

Toms Hartmanis (born 12 December 1987 in Liepāja, Soviet Union), is a Latvian ice hockey right winger playing for the HK Kurbads of the Latvian Hockey League. He previously played for the Newcastle Vipers of the British Elite Ice Hockey League, Dinamo Riga of the Kontinental Hockey League (KHL), Almtuna IS of the Swedish HockeyAllsvenskan, HK Riga 2000 of the Belarusian Belarusian Extraleague, and the Missouri Mavericks of the Central Hockey League.

On 9 September 2011, Hartmanis signed with the Mavericks before the team's pre-season training camp. Hartmanis was released by the Mavericks after training camp on 17 October 2011. He was confirmed as the signing for the Fife Flyers on 25 October 2011.
