= Edgars Masaļskis =

Latvian ice hockey player

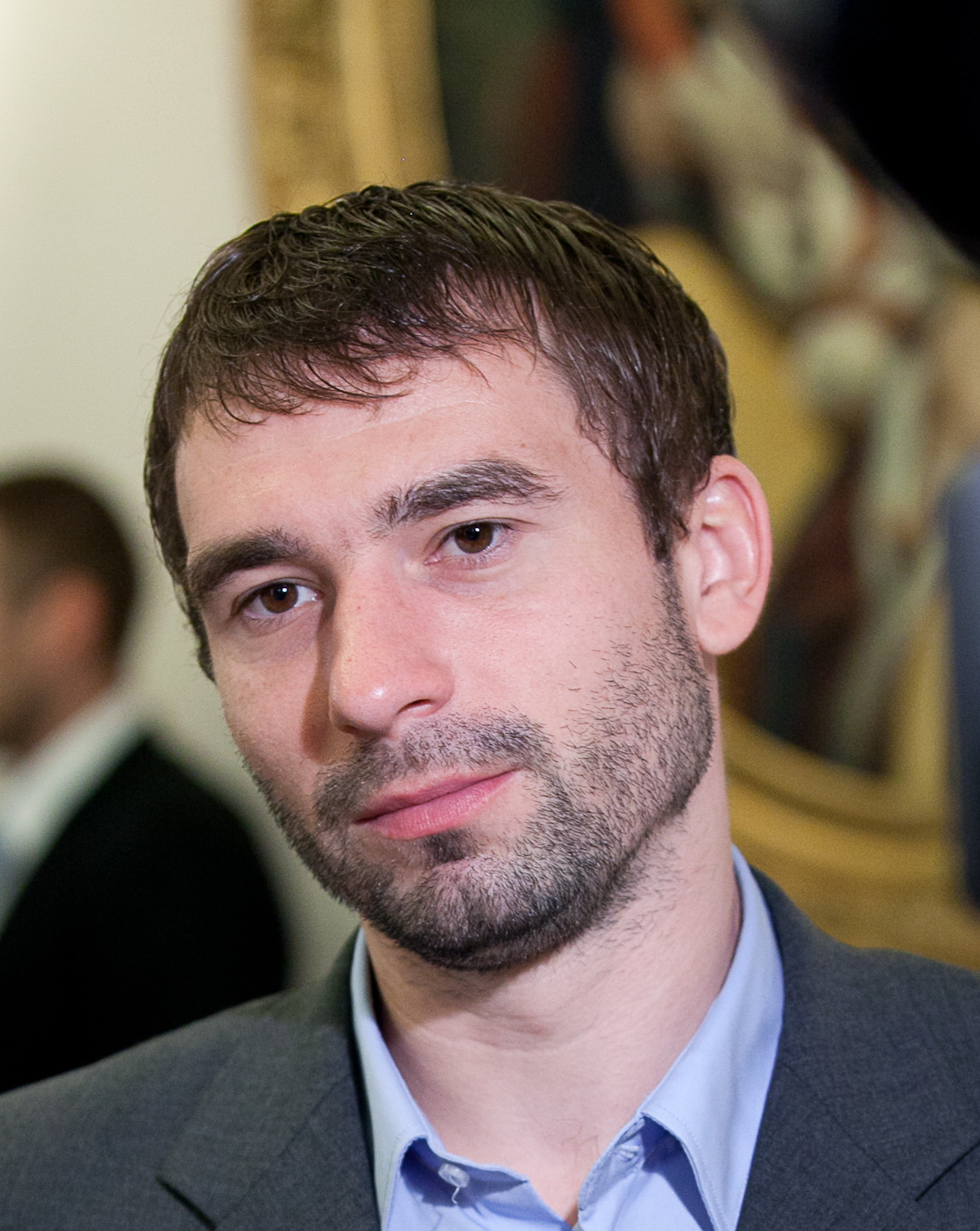
- Born: 31 March 1980 (age 46) Riga, Latvian SSR, Soviet Union
- Height: 5 ft 9 in (175 cm)
- Weight: 172 lb (78 kg; 12 st 4 lb)
- Position: Goaltender
- Caught: Left
- Played for: HK Lido Nafta Riga; HK Riga; HK Liepājas Metalurgs; HC Sibir Novosibirsk; Mörrums GoIS IK; HC Karlovy Vary; Dukla Jihlava; IHC Písek; Neftyanik Almetievsk; EHC Freiburg; Metallurg Zhlobin; Dinamo Riga; EV Duisburg Die Füchse; HC Yugra; HK Poprad; HC Ambrì-Piotta; HC Lada Togliatti
- National team: Latvia
- Playing career: 1996–2017

Edgars Masaļskis (born 31 March 1980) is a Latvian ice hockey coach and former player. Playing as a goaltender, Masaļskis represented the Latvian national team, and has played for a number of clubs, with five seasons in Liepājas Metalurgs as his longest stay at any club. He retired after the 2016–17 season, and joined Dinamo Riga's coaching staff on 2 October 2017.

== International play ==
Masaļskis has played twelve World Hockey Championships, four Winter Olympic Games tournaments and two World Junior Hockey Championships tournaments.

He was named to the Latvia men's national ice hockey team for competition at the 2014 IIHF World Championship.
