= Duvie Westcott =

Canadian ice hockey player (born 1977)

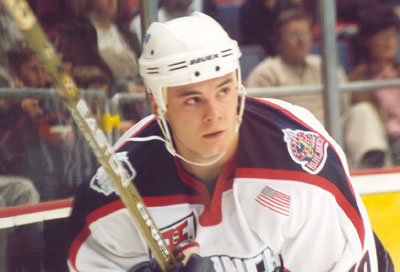
- Westcott with the Syracuse Crunch during the 2001–02 season
- Born: October 30, 1977 (age 48) Winnipeg, Manitoba, Canada
- Height: 5 ft 11 in (180 cm)
- Weight: 197 lb (89 kg; 14 st 1 lb)
- Position: Defence
- Shot: Right
- Played for: Columbus Blue Jackets; JYP Jyväskylä; Dinamo Riga; Dinamo Minsk; ZSC Lions; Kloten Flyers; Hamburg Freezers
- NHL draft: Undrafted
- Playing career: 2001–2015

Druval "Duvie" Westcott (born October 30, 1977) is a Canadian former professional ice hockey defenceman who last played for the Hamburg Freezers of the Deutsche Eishockey Liga (German Ice Hockey League). Westcott played his whole National Hockey League career with the Columbus Blue Jackets before signing with Dinamo Riga of the KHL.

== Playing career ==
Westcott was signed by Columbus as an undrafted free agent on May 10, 2001. Westcott has played in 201 career NHL games, scoring eleven goals and 45 assists for 56 points. He had also compiled 299 penalty minutes. During the NHL lockout, he played in Finland. On July 22, 2008, Westcott signed a one-year contract with Dinamo Riga of the Kontinental Hockey League.

On May 21, 2009, Westcott signed a one-year contract with Dinamo Minsk of the Kontinental Hockey League. Westcott moved to the Swiss National League A for the following two seasons, playing with the ZSC Lions and Kloten Flyers.

On June 19, 2012, Westcott continued his journeyman career throughout Europe, and signed a two-year deal with German club, to add experience to the blueline of the Hamburg Freezers of the DEL.

== Career statistics ==
			Regular season					Playoffs
Season	Team	League	GP	G	A	Pts	PIM	GP	G	A	Pts	PIM
1997–98	University of Alaska Anchorage	WCHA	25	3	5	8	43	—	—	—	—	—
1998–99	Omaha Lancers	USHL	12	3	3	6	31	14	0	8	8	84
1999–00	St. Cloud State University	WCHA	36	1	18	19	67	—	—	—	—	—
2000–01	St. Cloud State University	WCHA	38	10	24	34	114	—	—	—	—	—
2001–02	Syracuse Crunch	AHL	68	4	29	33	99	10	0	1	1	12
2001–02	Columbus Blue Jackets	NHL	4	0	0	0	2	—	—	—	—	—
2002–03	Syracuse Crunch	AHL	22	1	10	11	54	—	—	—	—	—
2002–03	Columbus Blue Jackets	NHL	39	0	7	7	77	—	—	—	—	—
2003–04	Columbus Blue Jackets	NHL	34	0	7	7	39	—	—	—	—	—
2004–05	JYP	SM-l	35	11	7	18	106	1	2	0	2	25
2005–06	Columbus Blue Jackets	NHL	78	6	22	28	133	—	—	—	—	—
2006–07	Columbus Blue Jackets	NHL	23	4	6	10	18	—	—	—	—	—
2007–08	Columbus Blue Jackets	NHL	23	1	3	4	30	—	—	—	—	—
2007–08	Syracuse Crunch	AHL	37	4	23	27	77	13	2	4	6	10
2008–09	Dinamo Riga	KHL	51	2	17	19	124	2	0	0	0	33
2009–10	Dinamo Minsk	KHL	55	3	19	22	146	—	—	—	—	—
2010–11	ZSC Lions	NLA	42	4	15	19	42	5	0	3	3	8
2011–12	Kloten Flyers	NLA	36	3	10	13	71	5	0	0	0	8
2012–13	Hamburg Freezers	DEL	42	5	13	18	60	5	0	1	1	43
2013–14	Hamburg Freezers	DEL	46	7	20	27	62	11	1	3	4	22
2014–15	Hamburg Freezers	DEL	34	5	11	16	42	7	1	4	5	8
NHL totals			201	11	45	56	299	—	—	—	—	—
KHL totals			106	5	36	41	270	2	0	0	0	33

== Awards and honours ==
Award	Year
MHSAA Champion	1995
MMJHL Champion	1996
USHL Clark Cup Champion	1998
All-WCHA Second Team	2000–01
WCHA All-Tournament Team	2001
WCHA Champion	2001
AHL All-Star Game	2003
KHL All-Star Game	2009
Spengler Cup	2009
Spengler Cup All-Star Team	2009
