= Aleksandrs Ņiživijs =

Latvian ice hockey player

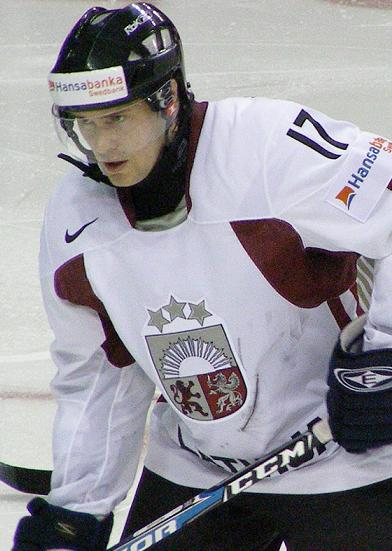
- Born: September 16, 1976 (age 49) Riga, Soviet Union
- Height: 5 ft 10 in (178 cm)
- Weight: 170 lb (77 kg; 12 st 2 lb)
- Position: Right wing
- Shot: Right
- Played for: HK Pārdaugava Rīga; Hokeja Centrs Rīga; Lokomotiv Yaroslavl; HC Dynamo Moscow; Molot-Prikamye Perm; HK Riga 2000; IF Björklöven; Torpedo Nizhny Novgorod; Dinamo Riga; Lev Praha
- National team: Latvia
- Playing career: 1992–2014

Aleksandrs Ņiživijs (born September 16, 1976) is a former Latvian professional ice hockey player. His last club was Dinamo Riga of the Kontinental Hockey League (KHL). He was also a regular Latvia national ice hockey team player.

== International play ==
He was named to the Latvia men's national ice hockey team for competition at the 2014 IIHF World Championship. He competed for Latvia at the Winter Olympics in 2002, 2006, and 2010.

== Career statistics ==
=== Regular season and playoffs ===
			Regular season					Playoffs
Season	Team	League	GP	G	A	Pts	PIM	GP	G	A	Pts	PIM
1992–93	Pārdaugava Rīga	LAT	15	12	13	25	2	—	—	—	—	—
1992–93	Pārdaugava Rīga	IHL	—	—	—	—	—	2	0	0	0	0
1993–94	Pārdaugava Rīga	IHL	30	5	3	8	8	—	—	—	—	—
1993–94	Hokeja Centrs Rīga	LAT	12	8	4	12	6	3	2	2	4	0
1994–95	Pārdaugava Rīga	IHL	47	2	9	11	16	—	—	—	—	—
1995–96	Torpedo Yaroslavl	IHL	46	6	12	18	4	3	1	0	1	0
1995–96	Torpedo–2 Yaroslavl	RUS.2	4	1	5	6	0	—	—	—	—	—
1996–97	Torpedo Yaroslavl	RSL	44	9	12	21	8	9	2	3	5	8
1996–97	Torpedo–2 Yaroslavl	RUS.3	5	5	4	9	2	—	—	—	—	—
1997–98	Torpedo Yaroslavl	RSL	40	4	10	14	43	5	0	1	1	4
1998–99	Torpedo Yaroslavl	RSL	40	9	3	12	6	14	2	6	8	8
1998–99	Torpedo–2 Yaroslavl	RUS.2	3	1	1	2	0	—	—	—	—	—
1999–2000	Torpedo Yaroslavl	RSL	37	8	13	21	45	10	2	4	6	6
1999–2000	Torpedo–2 Yaroslavl	RUS.3	2	0	0	0	2	—	—	—	—	—
2000–01	Lokomotiv Yaroslavl	RSL	33	6	6	12	12	10	1	1	2	2
2000–01	Lokomotiv–2 Yaroslavl	RUS.3	2	1	3	4	2	—	—	—	—	—
2001–02	Dynamo Moscow	RSL	40	3	3	6	8	3	0	0	0	0
2001–02	Dynamo–2 Moscow	RUS.3	2	3	3	6	0	—	—	—	—	—
2002–03	Molot-Prikamye Perm	RSL	25	2	2	4	2	—	—	—	—	—
2003–04	HK Rīga 2000	LAT	9	6	7	13	0	—	—	—	—	—
2003–04	HK Rīga 2000	EEHL	17	5	3	8	4	—	—	—	—	—
2004–05	IF Björklöven	Allsv	46	21	23	44	37	—	—	—	—	—
2005–06	Torpedo Nizhny Novgorod	RUS.2	49	11	25	36	48	8	1	2	3	0
2006–07	Torpedo Nizhny Novgorod	RUS.2	39	14	32	46	24	11	3	7	10	2
2007–08	Torpedo Nizhny Novgorod	RSL	31	3	9	12	14	—	—	—	—	—
2007–08	Torpedo–2 Nizhny Novgorod	RUS.3	6	4	2	6	2	—	—	—	—	—
2008–09	Dinamo Rīga	KHL	53	9	18	27	18	3	1	2	3	0
2009–10	Dinamo Rīga	KHL	50	12	24	36	41	9	1	3	4	4
2010–11	Dinamo Rīga	KHL	53	12	24	36	18	10	4	3	7	2
2011–12	Dinamo Rīga	KHL	33	3	6	9	20	3	0	0	0	2
2012–13	Dinamo Rīga	KHL	33	1	14	15	6	—	—	—	—	—
2012–13	Lev Praha	KHL	7	1	0	1	2	3	0	0	0	0
2013–14	Dinamo Rīga	KHL	36	2	11	13	16	7	0	3	3	0
IHL totals			123	13	24	37	28	5	1	0	1	0
RSL totals			290	44	58	102	138	54	9	17	26	28
KHL totals			265	40	97	137	121	35	6	11	17	8

=== International ===
Year	Team	Event	GP	G	A	Pts	PIM
1993	Latvia	EJC C Q	2	2	1	3	0
1993	Latvia	EJC C	4	5	3	8	4
1994	Latvia	WJC C	4	5	7	12	4
1994	Latvia	EJC C	6	14	6	20	10
1995	Latvia	WJC C1	4	4	3	7	0
1995	Latvia	WC B	5	0	3	3	2
1996	Latvia	WC B	7	3	3	6	4
1996	Latvia	OGQ	4	2	1	3
1998	Latvia	WC	6	2	0	2	0
1999	Latvia	WC	6	1	3	4	4
1999	Latvia	WC Q	3	0	0	0	0
2000	Latvia	WC	7	1	3	4	0
2001	Latvia	OGQ	2	0	1	1	0
2002	Latvia	OG	4	2	3	5	2
2002	Latvia	WC	4	1	0	1	0
2003	Latvia	WC	6	0	0	0	4
2004	Latvia	WC	7	1	2	3	6
2005	Latvia	OGQ	3	0	3	3	0
2005	Latvia	WC	6	0	2	2	2
2006	Latvia	OG	5	2	3	5	0
2006	Latvia	WC	6	0	3	3	4
2007	Latvia	WC	6	1	0	1	0
2008	Latvia	WC	6	1	1	2	2
2009	Latvia	OGQ	3	1	0	1	2
2009	Latvia	WC	7	3	5	8	3
2010	Latvia	OG	4	0	2	2	2
2010	Latvia	WC	6	1	1	2	0
2011	Latvia	WC	6	1	4	5	4
2013	Latvia	OGQ	3	0	3	3	4
2014	Latvia	WC	7	1	1	2	4
Junior totals			20	30	20	50	18
Senior totals			129	24	47	71	48
