= Atvars Tribuncovs =

Latvian ice hockey player

- Born: October 14, 1976 (age 49) Ogre, Soviet Union
- Height: 6 ft 2 in (188 cm)
- Weight: 220 lb (100 kg; 15 st 10 lb)
- Position: Defence
- Shot: Left
- Played for: HK Pardaugava Riga; Juniors Riga; Stoczniowiec Gdansk; Spartak Moskva; Kokkolan Hermes; Lukko; Tallahassee Tiger Sharks; Hamburg Crocodiles; REV Bremerhaven; Berlin Capitals; Salavat Yulayev Ufa; Spartak Moskva; Mora IK; Kärpät; Färjestads BK; HC Lada Togliatti; MoDo Hockey; HC Energie Karlovy Vary; KLH Chomutov; Dinamo Riga; Skellefteå AIK
- National team: Latvia
- Playing career: 1992–2016

Atvars Tribuncovs (born October 14, 1976) is a former professional ice hockey player. He competed for Latvia at the 2002 and 2006 Winter Olympics. Tribuncovs won gold in 2019/2020 season coaching Saryarka Karagandy in the Kazakhstan Hockey Championship league.

== Career statistics ==
=== Regular season and playoffs ===
			Regular season					Playoffs
Season	Team	League	GP	G	A	Pts	PIM	GP	G	A	Pts	PIM
1992–93	Pārdaugava–2 Rīga	LAT	18	5	5	10	8	—	—	—	—	—
1993–94	Pārdaugava–2 Rīga	LAT	24	7	10	17	32	—	—	—	—	—
1994–95	Pārdaugava Rīga	IHL	12	0	0	0	8	—	—	—	—	—
1995–96	Juniors Rīga	EEHL	37	5	4	9	36	—	—	—	—	—
1996–97	Stoczniowiec Gdańsk	POL
1997–98	Spartak Moscow	RSL	8	0	0	0	0	—	—	—	—	—
1997–98	Spartak–2 Moscow	RUS.3	12	2	4	6	20	—	—	—	—	—
1997–98	Hermes	FIN.2	10	2	4	6	12	—	—	—	—	—
1998–99	Lukko	SM-l	49	1	12	13	62	—	—	—	—	—
1999–2000	Hamburg Crocodiles	DEU.2	36	4	10	14	36	—	—	—	—	—
1999–2000	Tallahassee Tiger Sharks	ECHL	4	0	0	0	0	—	—	—	—	—
2000–01	REV Bremerhaven	DEU.2	38	8	18	26	60	9	2	2	4	20
2001–02	Berlin Capitals	DEL	58	7	12	19	46	—	—	—	—	—
2002–03	Salavat Yulaev Ufa	RSL	44	4	10	14	56	3	0	0	0	0
2003–04	Salavat Yulaev Ufa	RSL	51	2	14	16	34	—	—	—	—	—
2003–04	Salavat Yulaev–2 Ufa	RUS.3	4	0	3	3	4	—	—	—	—	—
2004–05	Spartak Moscow	RSL	12	0	0	0	32	—	—	—	—	—
2004–05	Salavat Yulaev Ufa	RSL	41	0	8	8	24	—	—	—	—	—
2005–06	Mora IK	SEL	39	4	7	11	50	—	—	—	—	—
2006–07	Kärpät	SM-l	39	5	14	19	64	—	—	—	—	—
2006–07	Färjestad BK	SEL	16	1	6	7	34	9	0	3	3	33
2007–08	Lada Togliatti	RSL	10	1	1	2	12	—	—	—	—	—
2007–08	Modo Hockey	SEL	33	3	9	12	62	5	0	1	1	6
2008–09	Dinamo Rīga	KHL	38	2	8	10	58	—	—	—	—	—
2008–09	Skellefteå AIK	SEL	9	1	3	4	12	10	0	0	0	6
2009–10	HC Energie Karlovy Vary	ELH	34	0	8	8	30	—	—	—	—	—
2009–10	KLH Chomutov	CZE.2	2	0	1	1	0	15	1	4	5	14
2010–11	HK SMScredit	LAT	6	4	5	9	4	—	—	—	—	—
2010–11	HK Gomel	BLR	19	6	4	10	30	5	0	6	6	12
2011–12	HK Gomel	BLR	41	7	33	40	54	5	1	2	3	2
2012–13	HK Gomel	BLR	36	9	31	40	54	5	1	0	1	8
2013–14	Arystan Temirtau	KAZ	45	6	21	27	38	13	2	6	8	6
2014–15	Neman Grodno	BLR	11	0	3	3	16	—	—	—	—	—
2015–16	HK Kurbads	LAT	12	3	6	9	28	—	—	—	—	—
2015–16	HK Zemgale/JLSS	LAT	11	3	1	4	26	4	0	2	2	4
LAT totals			71	22	27	49	98	4	0	2	2	4
RSL totals			166	7	33	40	158	3	0	0	0	0
SEL totals			97	9	25	34	158	24	0	4	4	45

=== International ===
Year	Team	Event	GP	G	A	Pts	PIM
1993	Latvia	EJC C	3	0	1	1	4
1994	Latvia	EJC C	6	3	4	7	4
1995	Latvia	WJC C1	4	5	0	5	6
1998	Latvia	WC	2	0	0	0	2
1999	Latvia	WC	6	0	1	1	4
1999	Latvia	WC Q	3	0	0	0	0
2000	Latvia	WC	7	0	0	0	8
2001	Latvia	OGQ	3	0	0	0	0
2001	Latvia	WC	6	0	0	0	0
2002	Latvia	OG	4	1	0	1	8
2002	Latvia	WC	6	0	0	0	10
2003	Latvia	WC	6	0	0	0	12
2004	Latvia	WC	7	1	1	2	6
2005	Latvia	OGQ	3	0	0	0	2
2005	Latvia	WC	6	1	0	1	6
2006	Latvia	OG	5	1	1	2	10
2006	Latvia	WC	6	0	1	1	8
2007	Latvia	WC	6	0	0	0	6
Junior totals			13	8	5	13	14
Senior totals			76	4	4	8	82
