= Guntis Galviņš =

Latvian ice hockey player

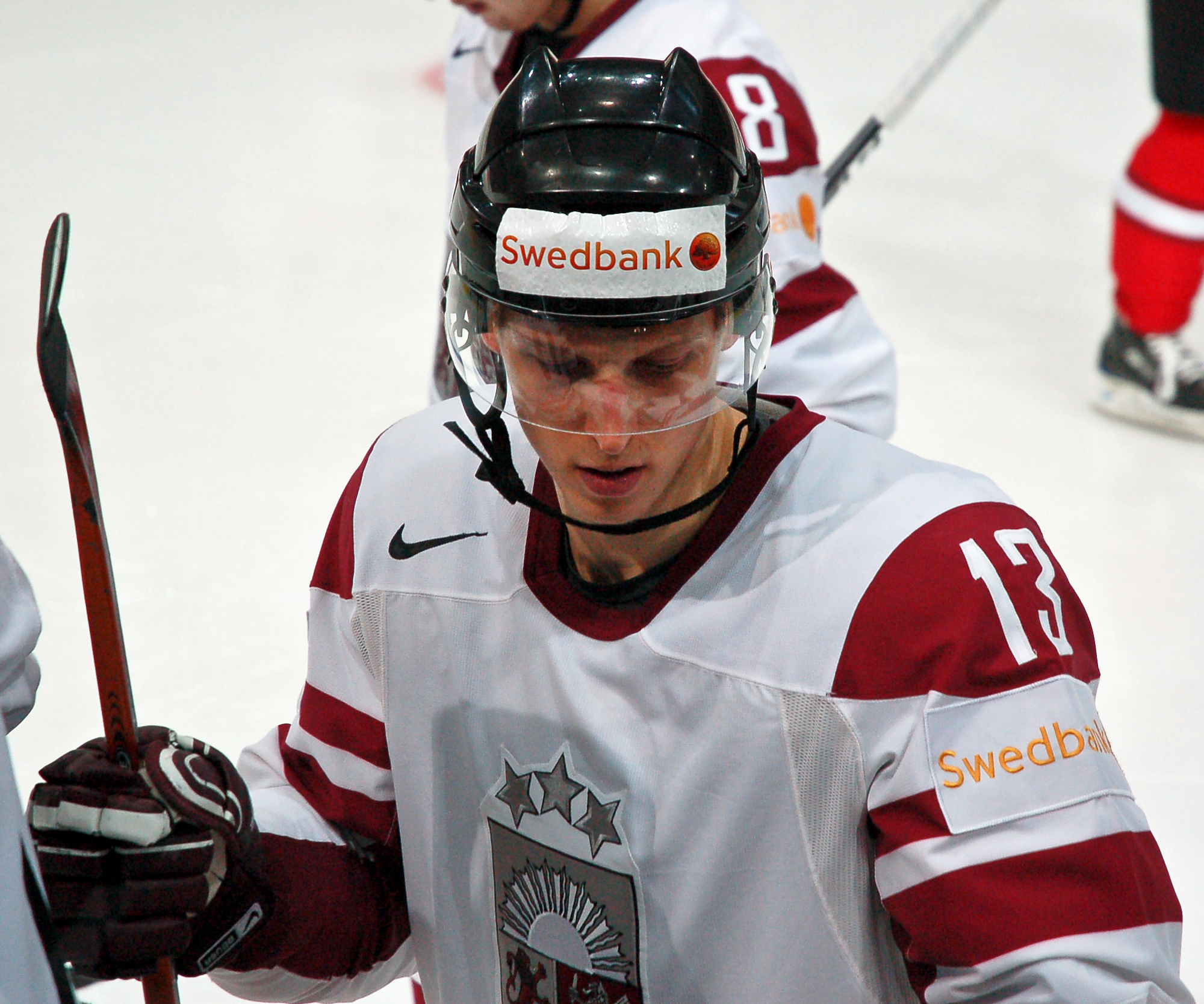
- Guntis Galviņš at IIHF WC 2009
- Born: January 25, 1986 (age 40) Talsi, Latvian SSR, Soviet Union
- Height: 6 ft 2 in (188 cm)
- Weight: 216 lb (98 kg; 15 st 6 lb)
- Position: Defence
- Shot: Left
- Played for: HK Riga 2000; HC Vsetin; Alba Volán Székesfehérvár; Dinamo Riga; HC Ugra; AIK IF; HC Bolzano; HK Kurbads; HC Oceláři Třinec; HC Vítkovice
- National team: Latvia
- Playing career: 2002–2022

Guntis Galviņš (born January 25, 1986) is a Latvian former professional ice-hockey defenceman, who played in the European leagues.

Galviņš made a return to Dinamo Riga of the Kontinental Hockey League (KHL), on July 8, 2015, signing a one-year contract as a free agent after a stint with Italian club, HCB South Tyrol in the then EBEL, the top tier league in Austria. Galviņš has played for the Latvian national team.

Galviņš retired from professional hockey after 20 seasons, ending his career with HC Vítkovice of the Czech Extraliga on completion of the 2021–22 season.

== Career statistics ==
=== Regular season and playoffs ===
			Regular season					Playoffs
Season	Team	League	GP	G	A	Pts	PIM	GP	G	A	Pts	PIM
2002–03	HK Prizma Rīga	EEHL B	13	0	1	1	4	—	—	—	—	—
2003–04	HK Prizma Rīga	LAT	18	2	3	5	28	2	0	1	1	0
2004–05	HK Rīga 2000	BLR	32	0	1	1	14	3	0	0	0	2
2004–05	HK Rīga 2000	LAT	12	4	5	9	8	11	2	2	4	4
2005–06	HK Rīga 2000	BLR	30	0	1	1	45	4	0	1	1	6
2005–06	HK Rīga 2000	LAT		0	3	3	6	—	—	—	—	—
2006–07	Vsetínská hokejová	ELH	39	2	1	3	46	—	—	—	—	—
2006–07	HK Rīga 2000	LAT	12	2	6	8	12	11	3	1	4	28
2007–08	HK Rīga 2000	LAT	12	2	1	3	20	—	—	—	—	—
2007–08	Alba Volán Székesfehérvár	EBEL	33	2	7	9	24	—	—	—	—	—
2007–08	Alba Volán Székesfehérvár	HUN	1	0	1	1	0	9	2	1	3	4
2008–09	Dinamo Rīga	KHL	47	1	7	8	24	1	0	0	0	0
2008–09	HK Rīga 2000	LAT	—	—	—	—	—	4	0	1	1	0
2009–10	Dinamo Rīga	KHL	53	7	10	17	51	9	0	3	3	4
2010–11	Dinamo Rīga	KHL	44	0	13	13	18	10	0	1	1	10
2011–12	Dinamo Rīga	KHL	54	8	21	29	28	7	0	3	3	2
2012–13	Dinamo Rīga	KHL	45	3	11	14	22	—	—	—	—	—
2013–14	HC Yugra	KHL	10	1	0	1	0	—	—	—	—	—
2013–14	AIK	SHL	15	1	0	1	2	—	—	—	—	—
2014–15	HC Bolzano	EBEL	36	2	9	11	4	7	1	0	1	0
2015–16	Dinamo Rīga	KHL	59	3	17	20	39	—	—	—	—	—
2016–17	Dinamo Rīga	KHL	51	7	16	23	20	—	—	—	—	—
2017–18	Dinamo Rīga	KHL	37	2	9	11	12	—	—	—	—	—
2018–19	HK Kurbads	LAT	5	0	3	3	2	—	—	—	—	—
2018–19	HC Oceláři Třinec	ELH	47	3	9	12	8	17	1	2	3	2
2019–20	HC Oceláři Třinec	ELH	47	2	4	6	14	—	—	—	—	—
2020–21	HC Oceláři Třinec	ELH	21	1	2	3	2	—	—	—	—	—
2020–21	HC Vítkovice Ridera	ELH	24	1	2	3	4	5	0	0	0	0
2021–22	HC Vítkovice Ridera	ELH	37	0	2	2	2	—	—	—	—	—
KHL totals			400	32	105	137	214	26	0	7	7	16
ELH totals			215	9	20	29	76	22	1	2	3	2

=== International ===
Year	Team	Event	GP	G	A	Pts	PIM
2003	Latvia	WJC18 D1	5	0	1	1	4
2004	Latvia	WJC18 D1	5	0	3	3	8
2005	Latvia	WJC D1	5	1	2	3	27
2005	Latvia	WC	6	0	1	1	0
2006	Latvia	WJC	5	1	1	2	29
2006	Latvia	WC	6	0	0	0	8
2007	Latvia	WC	6	1	2	3	8
2008	Latvia	WC	6	0	0	0	2
2009	Latvia	OGQ	3	0	0	0	2
2009	Latvia	WC	7	1	2	3	2
2010	Latvia	OG	2	0	0	0	0
2010	Latvia	WC	6	1	1	2	8
2012	Latvia	WC	7	0	3	3	2
2014	Latvia	WC	7	0	1	1	0
2015	Latvia	WC	7	1	4	5	0
2016	Latvia	WC	7	0	2	2	2
2017	Latvia	WC	7	0	1	1	2
2018	Latvia	WC	8	1	1	2	0
2019	Latvia	WC	4	0	0	0	2
Junior totals			20	2	7	9	68
Senior totals			89	5	18	23	38
