= Dinamo Riga =

Inactive ice hockey team in Riga, Latvia

- City: Riga, Latvia
- Founded: 2008
- Folded: 2023
- Home arena: Inbox.lv ledus halle (capacity: 1,000)
- Owners: AS Dinamo Rīga
- General manager: Jurijs Kuzņecovs
- Website: www.dinamoriga.lv
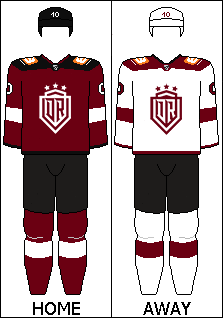
- Uniforms used since the 2020–21 KHL season.

HK Dinamo Riga (Latvian: Rīgas "Dinamo") was a professional ice hockey team based in Riga, Latvia. It most recently was a member of the Latvian Hockey Higher League. The club was affiliated with the club HK Zemgale/LBTU.

The club was re-founded on 7 April 2008 as a successor of a former team (also named "Dinamo Riga"), which was founded in 1946, but ceased to exist in 1995. Since being re-established, Dinamo Riga played their home games at the Arēna Rīga until 2022, which could accommodate 10,300 spectators.

The farm clubs of the team were HK Dinamo Juniors (2008–2014) and HK Rīga (2014–2022).

== History ==
The club was re-founded on 7 April 2008 and among the founders of the club were Guntis Ulmanis, Kirovs Lipmans, Aigars Kalvītis, Juris Savickis, Viesturs Koziols and others. However, on 27 May, Latvian Ice Hockey Federation president Kirovs Lipmans stepped out of the project because of a possible clash of interests. After the first season, Viesturs Koziols also left the project.

Július Šupler became the first head coach of the club. For the first two seasons, he was assisted by Miroslav Miklošovič and Artis Ābols, but in 2010, Viktors Ignatjevs replaced Miklošovič. On 27 April 2011, the new head coach, Pekka Rautakallio, was announced.

In the first season of the franchise, the team was led by players like Masaļskis, Prusek, Westcott, Ņiživijs, Hossa and others. After 2008–09, forward Aigars Cipruss decided to retire and instantly became the manager of Dinamo Riga's farm club, Dinamo-Juniors Riga. The team finished the regular season in tenth position, higher than anyone would have predicted before the start of the season. However, in the first round of the league playoffs, Dinamo lost 3–0 to Dynamo Moscow, which later advanced to the Gagarin Cup semifinals.

Following the first season, Dinamo managed to sign legendary Sandis Ozoliņš, as well as Jānis Sprukts, Mārtiņš Karsums and others. The team finished the regular season in eighth place of the Western Conference, which qualified them for the playoffs. In the first round of the playoffs, Dinamo faced SKA Saint Petersburg with players like Sergei Zubov, Petr Čajánek, Maxim Sushinsky and Alexei Yashin on the roster. Still, Dinamo managed to beat SKA 3–1 and advance to the Western Conference semifinals. In the semifinals, Dinamo was defeated 4–1 by later Gagarin Cup finalist HC MVD.

After his league-leading performance, Marcel Hossa signed a two-year contract with the then KHL champions Ak Bars Kazan. Martin Kariya signed a two-year contract with Swiss NLA's HC Ambrì-Piotta. New players signed during the off-season included Tomáš Surový, Brock Trotter, Mikael Tellqvist and the returning Mark Hartigan. Július Šupler resumed his post as the head coach.

The team finished the season in seventh place in the Western Conference and thirteenth in the league, as the team qualified to the playoffs. In the first round, their opponents were Dynamo Moscow. Dinamo won the series 4–2, advancing to the next round and facing Lokomotiv Yaroslavl. Dinamo lost the series 4–1.

As of the end of the third season, head coach Július Šupler left the team to be the coach of CSKA Moscow. On 27 April 2011, Dinamo signed Pekka Rautakallio for the head coach position. Also, all the foreign players with no active contracts left the team to play somewhere else. Brock Trotter also left, using his chance to play in the NHL with the Montreal Canadiens.

In February 2022, Dinamo and the Finnish side Jokerit withdrew from the KHL due to the Russian invasion of Ukraine.

On 10 August 2022, it was announced that Dinamo Riga would play in the Latvian Hockey Higher League during the 2022–23 season. On 11 July 2023, it was announced that Dinamo Riga would not play in the 2023–24 season. The team still exists legally as the akciju sabiedrība "Dinamo Rīga", but has not entered any competitions since August 2023 and is inactive.

== Crest ==
2008–2020

2020–2023

== Season-by-season record ==
This is a partial list of the last ten seasons completed by Dinamo Riga. For the full season-by-season history, see List of Dinamo Riga seasons.

Note: GP = Games played, W = Wins, L = Losses, OTW = Overtime/shootout wins, OTL = Overtime/shootout losses, Pts = Points, GF = Goals for, GA = Goals against

Season	League	GP	W	L	OTW	OTL	Pts	GF	GA	Finish	Playoffs
2008–09	KHL	56	24	23	5	4	86	132	156	2nd, Kharlamov	Lost in First Round, 0–3 (Dynamo Moscow)
2009–10	KHL	56	23	22	4	7	84	174	175	5th, Bobrov	Lost in Conference Semifinals, 1–4 (MVD)
2010–11	KHL	54	20	20	7	7	81	160	149	4th, Bobrov	Lost in Conference Semifinals, 1–4 (Lokomotiv Yaroslavl)
2011–12	KHL	54	24	5	4	23	86	132	156	3rd, Bobrov	Lost in Conference Quarterfinals, 3–4 (Torpedo Nizhny Novgorod)
2012–13	KHL	52	13	31	4	4	51	109	151	7th, Bobrov	Did not qualify
2013–14	KHL	54	22	16	11	5	93	141	122	3rd, Bobrov	Lost in Conference Quarterfinals, 3–4 (Donbass Donetsk)
2014–15	KHL	60	22	30	3	5	77	136	160	5th, Bobrov	Did not qualify
2015–16	KHL	60	17	34	8	8	75	129	151	7th, Bobrov	Did not qualify
2016–17	KHL	60	11	34	10	5	58	116	158	7th, Bobrov	Did not qualify
2017–18	KHL	56	9	31	7	9	50	105	153	6th, Bobrov	Did not qualify
2018–19	KHL	62	18	26	8	10	62	129	155	5th, Bobrov	Did not qualify
2019–20	KHL	62	11	38	6	7	41	103	187	6th, Bobrov	Did not qualify
2020–21	KHL	60	5	41	4	10	28	126	211	5th, Tarasov	Did not qualify
2021–22	KHL	45	9	22	5	9	37	93	143	6th, Tarasov	Did not qualify
2022–23	OHL	32	16	10	5	1	43	147	105	3rd	Lost in Semifinals, 0–4 Zemgale/LLU

== Players ==
For a list of all Dinamo Riga players with a Wikipedia article, see List of Dinamo Riga players.

=== Retired numbers ===
Dinamo Riga retired numbers
No.	Player	Position	Career
8	Sandis Ozoliņš	D	2009–2012, 2013–2014

=== Team captains ===
- Rodrigo Laviņš, 2008–2009
- Sandis Ozoliņš, 2009–2012
- Mārtiņš Karsums, 2012–2013
- Sandis Ozoliņš, 2013–2014
- Lauris Dārziņš, 2014–2016
- Gints Meija 2016–2017
- Miks Indrašis 2017–2018
- Lauris Dārziņš, 2018–2022
- Georgijs Pujacs, 2022–2023
- Miķelis Rēdlihs, 2023–2023

=== Head coaches ===
- Július Šupler, 22 May 2008 – 29 March 2011
- Pekka Rautakallio, 27 April 2011 – 5 November 2012
- Artis Ābols, 5 November 2012 – 30 April 2015
- Kari Heikkilä, July 2015 – 7 January 2016
- Normunds Sējējs, 7 January 2016 – 29 May 2017
- Sandis Ozoliņš, 29 May 2017 – 28 September 2017
- Ģirts Ankipāns, 28 September 2017 – 3 March 2020
- Pēteris Skudra, 20 July 2020 – 3 March 2021
- Sergei Zubov, 12 April 2021 – 21 October 2021
- Valērijs Kuļibaba, 22 October 2021 – 29 November 2021
- Vladimir Krikunov, 29 November 2021 – 30 April 2022
- Leonīds Beresņevs, 17 August 2022 – 20 March 2023

== Franchise records and leaders ==
=== Scoring leaders ===
Player	GP	G	A	Pts	+/–	PIM
(Latvia) Lauris Dārziņš	506	124	175	299	–14	282
(Latvia) Miķelis Rēdlihs	581	120	173	293	–41	386
(Latvia) Miks Indrašis	319	88	98	186	+6	113
(Slovakia) Marcel Hossa	241	105	80	185	–12	252
(Latvia) Aleksandrs Niživijs	290	45	108	153	–46	127
(Latvia) Guntis Galviņš	416	31	112	143	–1	230
(Latvia) Krišjānis Rēdlihs	449	37	99	136	–13	205
(Latvia) Gints Meija	541	51	69	120	–53	210
(Latvia) Mārtiņš Karsums	196	62	57	119	+3	183
(Latvia) Jānis Sprukts	186	42	73	115	+12	130

=== Leading goaltenders ===
Player	GP	TOI	W	L	GA	SO	SV%	GAA
(Russia) Timur Bilyalov	38	2,035:59	15	14	74	4	93.0%	2.18
(Latvia) Jānis Kalniņš	72	3,835:47	18	34	143	4	92.7%	2.24
(Sweden) Mikael Tellqvist	103	5,880:56	44	42	232	5	91.8%	2.37
(Czech Republic) Jakub Sedláček	126	7,082:09	41	58	286	10	91.8%	2.42
(Sweden) Joacim Eriksson	34	1,934:53	9	17	78	2	91.9%	2.42
(United States) Chris Holt	90	5,246:44	37	34	214	6	91.7%	2.45
(Lithuania) Mantas Armalis	12	576:37	3	5	24	0	91.1%	2.50
(Czech Republic) Alexander Salak	32	1,835:38	8	19	77	2	91.2%	2.52
(Latvia) Kristers Gudļevskis	42	2,255:16	13	24	98	3	90.1%	2.61
(Czech Republic) Martin Prusek	55	3,017:36	18	26	132	6	91.6%	2.62
