= 2009–10 Canada men's national ice hockey team =

The Canada men's national ice hockey team participated in various events during the 2009–10 ice hockey season.

== News and notes ==
- June 29, 2009: Hockey hall of famer Jean Béliveau was named an honorary Team Canada member and honorary captain of Canada's 2010 Men's Olympic Hockey Team. Béliveau was honoured at a press conference, which was part of a Hockey Canada Foundation fundraiser. Serge Savard and Yvan Cournoyer presented Béliveau with a Team Canada jersey.
- February 28: After winning the gold medal, Canada has once again earned the number one ranking in the IIHF Women's World Ranking. Canada's men are also ranked first in the IIHF Men's World Ranking.

== IIHF World Jr. Championships ==
Canada hosted the 2010 World Junior Ice Hockey Championships from December 26, 2009, to January 5, 2010. The Canada roster included 21 NHL draft picks, including 10 first round selections. Of note, Jordan Eberle passed John Tavares as Canada's all-time leading goal scorer in the World Junior Hockey Tournament with 14 goals.

=== Roster ===
- Head coach: (Canada) Willie Desjardins

Pos.	No.	Player	Team	NHL Rights
GK	1	Jake Allen	(Canada) Le Club de Hockey Junior de Montréal	St. Louis Blues
GK	31	Martin Jones	(Canada) Calgary Hitmen	Los Angeles Kings
D	2	Colten Teubert	(Canada) Regina Pats	Los Angeles Kings
D	3	Travis Hamonic	(Canada) Moose Jaw Warriors	New York Islanders
D	5	Marco Scandella	(Canada) Val-d'Or Foreurs	Minnesota Wild
D	6	Ryan Ellis	(Canada) Windsor Spitfires	Nashville Predators
D	22	Jared Cowen	(Canada) Spokane Chiefs	Ottawa Senators
D	24	Calvin de Haan	(Canada) Oshawa Generals	New York Islanders
D	27	Alex Pietrangelo	(Canada) St. Louis Blues	St. Louis Blues
F	4	Taylor Hall	(Canada) Windsor Spitfires	Undrafted, 2010
F	7	Gabriel Bourque	(Canada) Baie-Comeau Drakkar	Nashville Predators
F	9	Nazem Kadri	(Canada) London Knights	Toronto Maple Leafs
F	10	Brayden Schenn	(Canada) Brandon Wheat Kings	Los Angeles Kings
F	12	Adam Henrique	(Canada) Windsor Spitfires	New Jersey Devils
F	14	Jordan Eberle	(Canada) Regina Pats	Edmonton Oilers
F	15	Brandon McMillan	(Canada) Kelowna Rockets	Anaheim Ducks
F	16	Greg Nemisz	(Canada) Windsor Spitfires	Calgary Flames
F	17	Brandon Kozun	(Canada) Calgary Hitmen	Los Angeles Kings
F	19	Stefan Della Rovere	(Canada) Barrie Colts	Washington Capitals
F	20	Luke Adam	(Canada) Cape Breton Screaming Eagles	Buffalo Sabres
F	26	Jordan Caron	(Canada) Rimouski Océanic	Boston Bruins
F	28	Patrice Cormier (C)	(Canada) Rimouski Océanic	New Jersey Devils

=== Preliminary round ===
Team	GP	W	OTW	OTL	L	GF	GA	Pts	Advance to ...
Canada	4	3	1	0	0	35	6	11	Semifinals
United States	4	3	0	1	0	26	9	10	Quarterfinals
Switzerland	4	2	0	0	2	11	15	6	Quarterfinals
Slovakia	4	1	0	0	3	14	22	3	Relegation round
Latvia	4	0	0	0	4	9	43	0	Relegation round

=== Medal round ===
- Semifinals

January 3, 2010; 16:00	Canada	6–1	Switzerland	Credit Union Centre (capacity: 14,705); Attendance: 13,427 (91.3%)

Game reference
Jordan Eberle (PP1) 03:48; Marco Scandella (SH1) 27:26; Taylor Hall 29:11; Brayden Schenn 42:58; Stefan Della Rovere 56:40; Taylor Hall 57:09 / Goals / Mauro Jorg (PP1) 32:27

=== Gold medal game ===
January 5, 2010; 19:00	Canada	5 – 6 OT	United States	Credit Union Centre (capacity: 14,705); Attendance: 15,171 (103.2%)

Game reference
Luke Adam 2:40; Greg Nemisz 16:03; Taylor Hall 23:56; Jordan Eberle (PP1) 57:11; Jordan Eberle 58:25 / Goals / 13:56 Chris Kreider; 14:32 Jordan Schroeder; 21:03 (PP1) John Carlson; 44:12 Jerry D'Amigo; 46:23 Derek Stepan; 64:31 John Carlson

== 2010 Winter Olympics ==
=== Roster ===
The following is the Canadian roster in the men's ice hockey tournament of the 2010 Winter Olympics.

No.	Pos.	Name	Height	Weight	Birthdate	Birthplace	2009–10 team
30	G	Martin Brodeur	188 cm (6 ft 2 in)	98 kg (216 lb)	6 May 1972	Montreal, QC	(United States) New Jersey Devils (NHL)
29	G	Marc-André Fleury	188 cm (6 ft 2 in)	82 kg (181 lb)	28 November 1984	Sorel-Tracy, QC	(United States) Pittsburgh Penguins (NHL)
1	G	Roberto Luongo	191 cm (6 ft 3 in)	93 kg (205 lb)	4 April 1979	Montreal, QC	(Canada) Vancouver Canucks (NHL)
22	D	Dan Boyle	180 cm (5 ft 11 in)	86 kg (190 lb)	12 July 1976	Ottawa, ON	(United States) San Jose Sharks (NHL)
8	D	Drew Doughty	185 cm (6 ft 1 in)	92 kg (203 lb)	8 December 1989	London, ON	(United States) Los Angeles Kings (NHL)
2	D	Duncan Keith	183 cm (6 ft 0 in)	85 kg (187 lb)	16 July 1983	Winnipeg, MB	(United States) Chicago Blackhawks (NHL)
27	D	Scott Niedermayer – C	185 cm (6 ft 1 in)	91 kg (201 lb)	31 August 1973	Cranbrook, BC	(United States) Anaheim Ducks (NHL)
20	D	Chris Pronger – A	198 cm (6 ft 6 in)	101 kg (223 lb)	10 October 1974	Dryden, ON	(United States) Philadelphia Flyers (NHL)
7	D	Brent Seabrook	191 cm (6 ft 3 in)	100 kg (220 lb)	20 April 1985	Richmond, BC	(United States) Chicago Blackhawks (NHL)
6	D	Shea Weber	193 cm (6 ft 4 in)	103 kg (227 lb)	14 August 1985	Sicamous, BC	(United States) Nashville Predators (NHL)
37	F	Patrice Bergeron	188 cm (6 ft 2 in)	88 kg (194 lb)	24 July 1985	L'Ancienne-Lorette, QC	(United States) Boston Bruins (NHL)
87	F	Sidney Crosby – A	180 cm (5 ft 11 in)	90 kg (200 lb)	7 August 1987	Cole Harbour, NS	(United States) Pittsburgh Penguins (NHL)
51	F	Ryan Getzlaf	193 cm (6 ft 4 in)	100 kg (220 lb)	10 May 1985	Regina, SK	(United States) Anaheim Ducks (NHL)
15	F	Dany Heatley	191 cm (6 ft 3 in)	100 kg (220 lb)	21 January 1981	Freiburg im Breisgau, West Germany	(United States) San Jose Sharks (NHL)
12	F	Jarome Iginla – A	185 cm (6 ft 1 in)	95 kg (209 lb)	1 July 1977	Edmonton, AB	(Canada) Calgary Flames (NHL)
11	F	Patrick Marleau	188 cm (6 ft 2 in)	100 kg (220 lb)	15 September 1979	Swift Current, SK	(United States) San Jose Sharks (NHL)
10	F	Brenden Morrow	180 cm (5 ft 11 in)	95 kg (209 lb)	16 January 1979	Carlyle, SK	(United States) Dallas Stars (NHL)
61	F	Rick Nash	193 cm (6 ft 4 in)	99 kg (218 lb)	16 June 1984	Brampton, ON	(United States) Columbus Blue Jackets (NHL)
18	F	Mike Richards	180 cm (5 ft 11 in)	91 kg (201 lb)	11 February 1985	Kenora, ON	(United States) Philadelphia Flyers (NHL)
24	F	Corey Perry	191 cm (6 ft 3 in)	95 kg (209 lb)	16 May 1985	Peterborough, ON	(United States) Anaheim Ducks (NHL)
21	F	Eric Staal	193 cm (6 ft 4 in)	93 kg (205 lb)	29 October 1984	Thunder Bay, ON	(United States) Carolina Hurricanes (NHL)
19	F	Joe Thornton	193 cm (6 ft 4 in)	107 kg (236 lb)	2 July 1979	London, ON	(United States) San Jose Sharks (NHL)
16	F	Jonathan Toews	188 cm (6 ft 2 in)	96 kg (212 lb)	29 April 1988	Winnipeg, MB	(United States) Chicago Blackhawks (NHL)

Defencemen Jay Bouwmeester and Stéphane Robidas, forwards Jeff Carter, Steven Stamkos and Martin St. Louis, and goaltender Chris Mason were selected as reserves in case of injury during the tournament.

=== Standings ===
Team	Pld	W	OTW	OTL	L	GF	GA	GD	Pts	Qualification
United States	3	3	0	0	0	14	5	+9	9	Quarterfinals
Canada	3	1	1	0	1	14	7	+7	5	
Switzerland	3	0	1	1	1	8	10	−2	3	
Norway	3	0	0	1	2	5	19	−14	1	

Source: IIHF

=== Gold medal game ===
Canada faced off against the United States on February 28, 2010. The teams were tied after regulation, with goals scored by Jonathan Toews and Corey Perry for Canada and Ryan Kesler and Zach Parise for USA; Parise scored with 25 seconds remaining in the third period to the game. In overtime, Sidney Crosby scored seven minutes in and won the gold medal for Canada.

The gold medal game was the last event of the Olympics.

=== Schedule ===
Date	Opponent	Time	Score	Record
Feb. 23	Germany	4:30 PM (PST)	8–2	3–1–0
Feb. 24	Russia	4:30 PM (PST)	7–3	4–1–0
Feb. 26	Slovakia	6:30 PM (PST)	3–2	5–1–0
Feb. 28	USA	12:15 PM	3–2 (OT)	6–1–0

== Paralympic Games ==
Canada will assemble a team to compete in ice sledge hockey at the 2010 Winter Paralympics.

=== Standings ===
Team	GP	W	OTW	OTL	L	GF	GA	GD	Pts
Canada (CAN)	3	3	0	0	0	19	1	+18	9
Norway (NOR)	3	1	1	0	1	4	7	−3	5
Sweden (SWE)	3	1	0	1	1	3	12	−9	4
Italy (ITA)	3	0	0	0	3	1	7	−6	0

Qualified for Medal Tournament
Qualified for the Classifications Round

All times are local (UTC-8).

=== Roster ===
Number	Name	Position	Height	Weight
22	Benoit St-Amand	Goaltender	5'10"	165
57	Paul Rosen	Goaltender	6'0"	205
11	Adam Dixon	Defense	5'9"	168
17	Jean Labonté	Defense	5'11"	205
21	Raymond Grassi	Defense	6'3"	260
29	Graeme Murray	Defense	5'5"	190
3	Hervé Lord	Forward	5'5"	150
4	Derek Whitson	Forward	6'1"	165
7	Marc Dorion	Forward	5'0"	137
8	Jeremy Booker	Forward	5'2"	125
10	Shawn Matheson	Forward	5'8"	130
12	Greg Westlake	Forward	6'2"	170
18	Billy Bridges	Forward	5'8"	190
19	Todd Nicholson	Forward	6'0"	180
27	Bradley Bowden	Forward	5'0"	154

=== Schedule ===
13 March 2010; 10:00	Canada	4–0 (1–0, 0–0, 3–0)	Italy	UBC Thunderbird Arena, Vancouver

Game reference

Paul Rosen
Goalies
Santino Stillitano
Referee:
(United States) Johnathan Morrison
Linesmen:
(Netherlands) Lodewijk Beelen
(Norway) Kai Gunnar Thøger-Andresen

Dorion (Bridges) – 09:28	1–0
Westlake (Dixon, Labonté)– 34:04	2–0
Westlake (Bowden) – 38:48	3–0
Labonté – 39:18	4–0

8 min
Penalties
10 min
16
Shots
4

14 March 2010; 13:30	Canada	10–1 (4–1, 4–0, 2–0)	Sweden	UBC Thunderbird Arena, Vancouver; Attendance: 5,504

Game reference

Benoit St-Amand
Goalies
Ulf Nilsson
Referee:
(United States) Scott Bokal
Linesmen:
(Norway) Steven Richardson
(Czech Republic) Leon Wesley

Bowden (Nicholson, Westlake) – 01:25	1–0
	1–1	01:38 – Ingvarsson
Westlake (Nicholson, Bowden) – 07:44	2–1
Dixon (Bridges) – 12:54	3–1
Bowden (Bridges, Westlake) – 13:47	4–1
Westlake (Dixon, Bridges) (PP) – 17:13	5–1
Dixon (Bowden, Bridges) (PP) – 22:16	6–1
Westlake (SH2) – 25:28	7–1
Dorion (SH) – 26:23	8–1
Dorion (Nicholson) – 31:19	9–1
Dorion – 34:58	10–1

20 min
Penalties
6 min
32
Shots
3

16 March 2010; 20:30	Norway	0–5 (0–2, 0–3, 0–0)	Canada	UBC Thunderbird Arena, Vancouver; Attendance: 5,430

Game reference

Roger Johansen
Kissinger Deng
Goalies
Paul Rosen
Referee:
(United States) Derek Berkebile
Linesmen:
(Poland) Tomasz Heltman
(United States) Brad Anton Roethlisberger

0–1	00:31 – Bridges (Dixon, Bowden) (PP)
0–2	07:14 – Westlake (Bowden) (SH)
0–3	15:11 – Bowden (Murray, Westlake)
0–4	18:46 – Westlake (Bowden, Bridges) (PP)
0–5	26:04 – Dixon (Labonté, Nicholson) (PP)

16 min
Penalties
10 min
8
Shots
12

== IIHF World Championships ==
Canada competed at the 2010 Men's World Ice Hockey Championships held in Germany from May 7 to May 23. Canada was placed seventh.

== Awards and honours ==
- Jordan Eberle, Most Valuable Player, 2010 IIHF World Junior Tournament
- Jordan Eberle, Media All-Star Team, 2010 IIHF World Junior Tournament
- Alex Pietrangelo, Best Defenseman, 2010 IIHF World Junior Tournament
- Alex Pietrangelo, Media All-Star Team, 2010 IIHF World Junior Tournament
- Jonathan Toews, Media All-Star Team, Vancouver 2010 games
- Jonathan Toews, IIHF Directorate Awards, Best Forward, Vancouver 2010 OIympics
- Shea Weber, Media All-Star Team, Vancouver 2010 games

== See also ==
- Canada men's national ice hockey team
- Ice hockey at the 2010 Winter Olympics
- Ice hockey at the Olympic Games
- List of Canadian national ice hockey team rosters

Preceded by 2005–06 Canada men's national ice hockey team	Canada men's Olympic ice hockey team 2010	Succeeded by 2013–14 Canada men's national ice hockey team
