= 2001–02 Canada men's national ice hockey team =

The 2001–02 Canada men's national ice hockey team represented Canada at the 2002 Winter Olympics officially hosted by Salt Lake City in Utah.

Team Canada, coached by Pat Quinn, won the gold medal. It was the first Olympic gold medal for Canada in men's ice hockey since the Edmonton Mercurys won gold at the 1952 Winter Olympics in Oslo, Norway.

== 2002 Winter Olympics roster ==
- Head coach: Pat Quinn
- Ed Belfour – Dallas Stars
- Rob Blake – Colorado Avalanche
- Eric Brewer – Edmonton Oilers
- Martin Brodeur – New Jersey Devils
- Theoren Fleury – New York Rangers
- Adam Foote – Colorado Avalanche
- Simon Gagne – Philadelphia Flyers
- Jarome Iginla – Calgary Flames
- Curtis Joseph – Toronto Maple Leafs
- Ed Jovanovski – Vancouver Canucks
- Paul Kariya – Mighty Ducks of Anaheim
- Mario Lemieux (C) – Pittsburgh Penguins
- Eric Lindros – New York Rangers
- Al MacInnis – St. Louis Blues
- Scott Niedermayer – New Jersey Devils
- Joe Nieuwendyk – Dallas Stars
- Owen Nolan – San Jose Sharks
- Michael Peca – New York Islanders
- Chris Pronger – (A) St. Louis Blues
- Joe Sakic – (A) Colorado Avalanche
- Brendan Shanahan – Detroit Red Wings
- Ryan Smyth – Edmonton Oilers
- Steve Yzerman (A) – Detroit Red Wings

== See also ==
- Canada men's national ice hockey team
- Ice hockey at the 2002 Winter Olympics
- Ice hockey at the Olympic Games
- List of Canadian national ice hockey team rosters

Preceded by 1997–98 Canada men's national ice hockey team	Canada men's Olympic ice hockey team 2002	Succeeded by 2005–06 Canada men's national ice hockey team
