= 2005–06 Canada men's national ice hockey team =

The 2005–06 Canada men's national ice hockey team represented Canada at the 2006 Winter Olympics held in Turin, Italy. The ice hockey matches were played in Turin.

Team Canada, coached by Pat Quinn, placed seventh in the Olympic tournament. It was the lowest position that a Canadian men's Olympic ice hockey team had ever achieved.

== 2006 Winter Olympics roster ==
Head coach: Pat Quinn

The following is the Canadian roster for the men's ice hockey tournament at the 2006 Winter Olympics.

Head coach: Pat Quinn

Assistant coaches: Wayne Fleming, Marc Habscheid, Ken Hitchcock, Jacques Martin

No.	Pos.	Name	Height	Weight	Birthdate	Team
1	G	Roberto Luongo	191 cm (6 ft 3 in)	93 kg (205 lb)	April 19, 1979 (aged 26)	(United States) Florida Panthers
3	D	Jay Bouwmeester	193 cm (6 ft 4 in)	88 kg (194 lb)	September 7, 1983 (aged 22)	(United States) Florida Panthers
4	D	Rob Blake (A)	193 cm (6 ft 4 in)	102 kg (225 lb)	December 10, 1969 (aged 36)	(United States) Colorado Avalanche
6	D	Wade Redden	188 cm (6 ft 2 in)	95 kg (209 lb)	June 12, 1977 (aged 28)	(Canada) Ottawa Senators
9	F	Shane Doan	188 cm (6 ft 2 in)	98 kg (216 lb)	October 10, 1976 (aged 29)	(United States) Phoenix Coyotes
12	F	Jarome Iginla (A)	185 cm (6 ft 1 in)	95 kg (209 lb)	July 1, 1977 (aged 28)	(Canada) Calgary Flames
14	F	Todd Bertuzzi	191 cm (6 ft 3 in)	111 kg (245 lb)	February 2, 1975 (aged 31)	(Canada) Vancouver Canucks
15	F	Dany Heatley	191 cm (6 ft 3 in)	98 kg (216 lb)	January 21, 1981 (aged 25)	(Canada) Ottawa Senators
21	F	Simon Gagné (A)	183 cm (6 ft 0 in)	84 kg (185 lb)	February 29, 1980 (aged 25)	(United States) Philadelphia Flyers
24	D	Bryan McCabe	188 cm (6 ft 2 in)	100 kg (220 lb)	June 8, 1975 (aged 30)	(Canada) Toronto Maple Leafs
26	F	Martin St. Louis	175 cm (5 ft 9 in)	84 kg (185 lb)	June 18, 1975 (aged 30)	(United States) Tampa Bay Lightning
28	D	Robyn Regehr	191 cm (6 ft 3 in)	102 kg (225 lb)	April 19, 1980 (aged 25)	(Canada) Calgary Flames
30	G	Martin Brodeur	188 cm (6 ft 2 in)	95 kg (209 lb)	May 6, 1972 (aged 33)	(United States) New Jersey Devils
33	F	Kris Draper	178 cm (5 ft 10 in)	86 kg (190 lb)	May 24, 1971 (aged 34)	(United States) Detroit Red Wings
35	G	Marty Turco	180 cm (5 ft 11 in)	83 kg (183 lb)	August 13, 1975 (aged 30)	(United States) Dallas Stars
39	F	Brad Richards	185 cm (6 ft 1 in)	90 kg (200 lb)	May 2, 1980 (aged 25)	(United States) Tampa Bay Lightning
40	F	Vincent Lecavalier	193 cm (6 ft 4 in)	93 kg (205 lb)	April 21, 1980 (aged 25)	(United States) Tampa Bay Lightning
44	D	Chris Pronger (A)	198 cm (6 ft 6 in)	100 kg (220 lb)	October 10, 1974 (aged 31)	(Canada) Edmonton Oilers
52	D	Adam Foote	188 cm (6 ft 2 in)	98 kg (216 lb)	July 10, 1971 (aged 34)	(United States) Columbus Blue Jackets
61	F	Rick Nash	193 cm (6 ft 4 in)	93 kg (205 lb)	June 16, 1984 (aged 21)	(United States) Columbus Blue Jackets
91	F	Joe Sakic (C)	180 cm (5 ft 11 in)	88 kg (194 lb)	July 7, 1969 (aged 36)	(United States) Colorado Avalanche
94	F	Ryan Smyth	185 cm (6 ft 1 in)	86 kg (190 lb)	February 21, 1976 (aged 29)	(Canada) Edmonton Oilers
97	F	Joe Thornton	193 cm (6 ft 4 in)	102 kg (225 lb)	July 2, 1979 (aged 26)	(United States) San Jose Sharks

Defencemen Scott Niedermayer and Ed Jovanovski were originally selected, but due to injuries were replaced by Jay Bouwmeester and Bryan McCabe, respectively. Dan Boyle took McCabe's previous spot as a reserve. Defenceman Dan Boyle and forwards Jason Spezza and Eric Staal were selected as "reserves" in case of injury before the tournament began.

== See also ==
- Canada men's national ice hockey team
- Ice hockey at the 2006 Winter Olympics
- Ice hockey at the Olympic Games
- List of Canadian national ice hockey team rosters

Preceded by 2001–02 Canada men's national ice hockey team	Canada men's Olympic ice hockey team 2006	Succeeded by 2009–10 Canada men's national ice hockey team
