= Jordan Caron =

Canadian ice hockey player (born 1990)

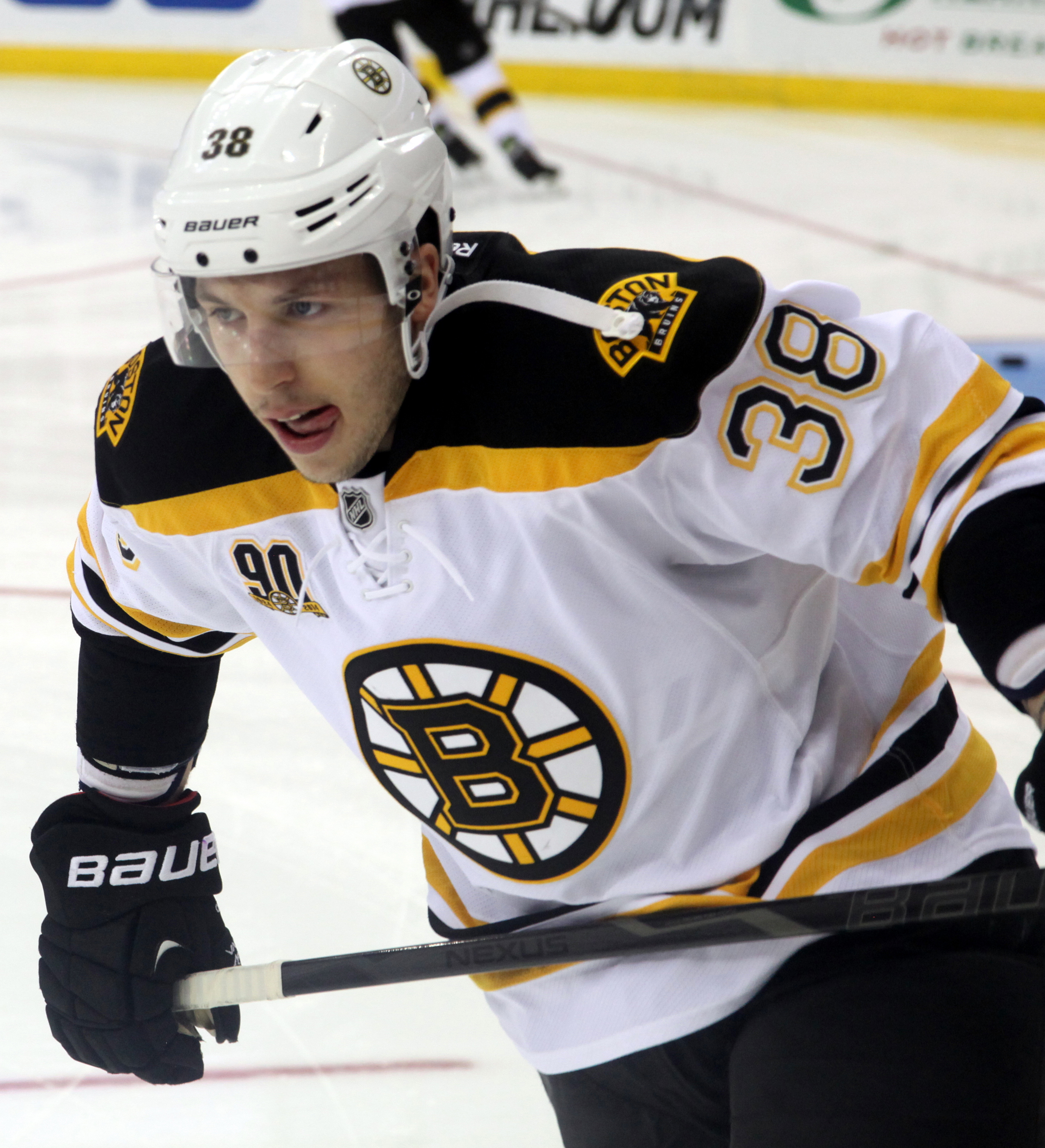
- Caron with the Boston Bruins in 2014
- Born: November 2, 1990 (age 35) Sayabec, Quebec, Canada
- Height: 6 ft 3 in (191 cm)
- Weight: 204 lb (93 kg; 14 st 8 lb)
- Position: Right wing
- Shot: Left
- Played for: Boston Bruins; Colorado Avalanche; St. Louis Blues; Krefeld Pinguine; Sibir Novosibirsk; Schwenninger Wild Wings; Genève-Servette HC; EC VSV
- NHL draft: 25th overall, 2009; Boston Bruins
- Playing career: 2010–2021

Jordan Julien Caron (born November 2, 1990) is a Canadian former professional ice hockey forward. He was drafted in the first round, 25th overall, by the Boston Bruins in the 2009 NHL entry draft from the Rimouski Océanic of the Quebec Major Junior Hockey League (QMJHL).

== Playing career ==
As a youth, Caron played in the 2003 and 2004 Quebec International Pee-Wee Hockey Tournaments with the Rimouski Océanic minor ice hockey team.

=== Junior ===
Caron played for the Athol Murray College of Notre Dame in 2005–06 prior to being drafted by the Rimouski Océanic in the first round, eighth overall in the 2006 QMJHL Draft. In his rookie season with the team, Caron finished fifth in team scoring, earning 40 points in 56 games, and led Rimouski with a +11 rating.

In his second year in Rimouski, Caron would miss some time due to injuries, appearing in only 46 games, however, he would improve on his point total from the previous year, scoring 20 goals and adding 23 assists for 43 points, helping the Océanic make the playoffs. Caron added four points in nine playoff games.

In 2008–09, Caron would once again improve with his numbers, appearing in 56 games, scoring a team high 36 goals, while earning 67 points, third highest on the club. In the playoffs, Caron earned 11 points in 13 games. Since Rimouski was hosting the 2009 Memorial Cup, the team had an automatic berth in the tournament. In four games, Caron scored two goals, as Rimouski was eliminated after losing to the Windsor Spitfires of the Ontario Hockey League (OHL) in the tie-breaking game.

Caron began the 2009–10 season with Rimouski, where in 20 games, he had 9 goals and 20 points. At the trade deadline, Caron was traded (along with teammate Patrice Cormier) to the Rouyn-Noranda Huskies. Caron finished the season with Huskies, where in 23 games, he scored 17 goals and 33 points. Caron then added 7 goals and 18 points in 11 playoff games for Rouyn-Noranda.

=== Professional ===
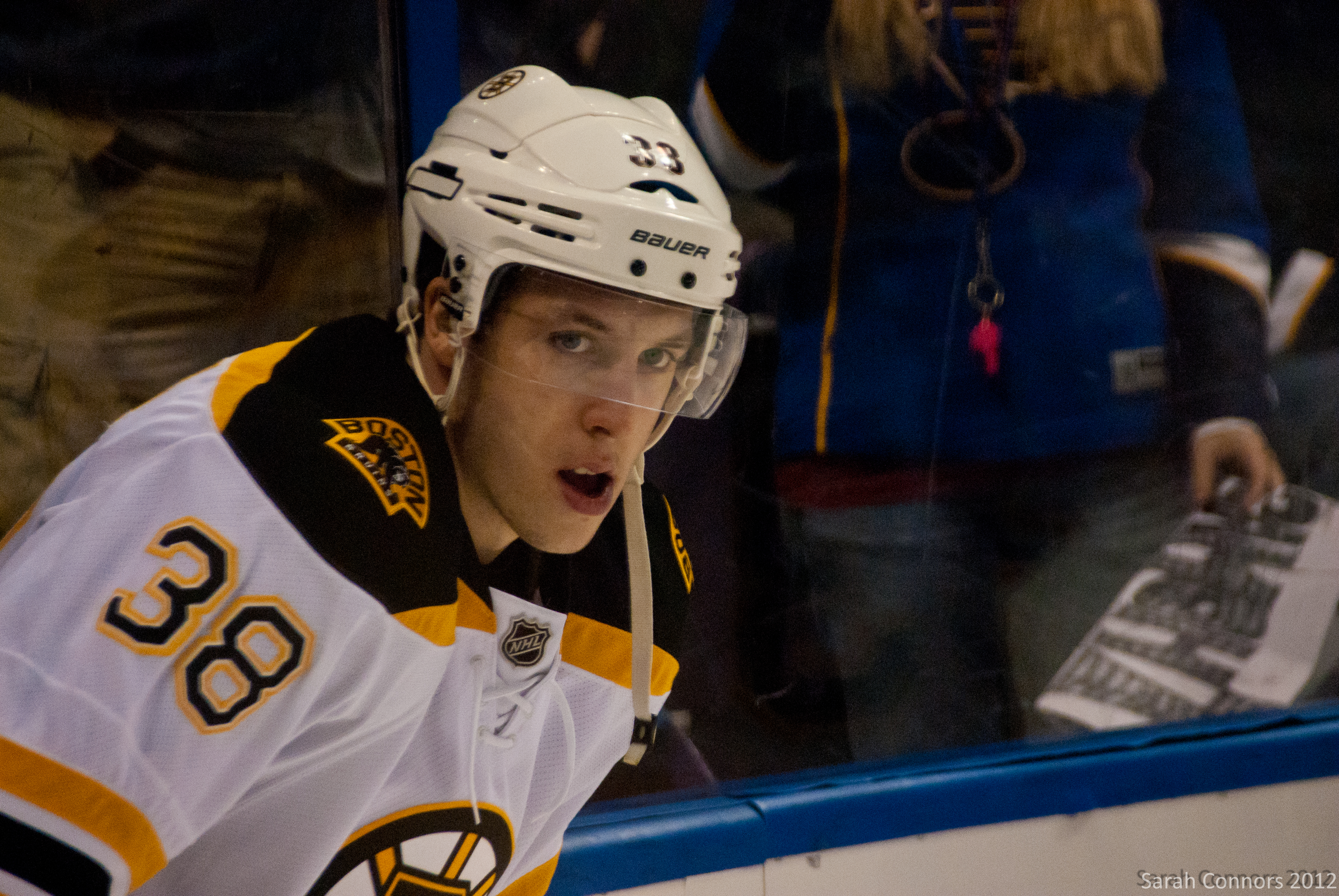
Caron in 2012.

Caron signed with the Boston Bruins on March 31, 2010. He began the 2010–11 season in the Bruins' NHL roster. He scored his first NHL goal on October 16, 2010, against Martin Brodeur of the New Jersey Devils. When Boston won the Stanley Cup in 2011, Caron received a Stanley Cup ring and was included in the team picture, although did not meet the requirement to have his named engraved on the Cup.

On July 16, 2014, Caron re-signed for his fifth season with the Bruins organization on a one-year contract. At the beginning of the 2014–15 season, despite making the Bruins' opening night roster, Caron was placed waivers on October 4, 2014. Going unclaimed, Caron was later reassigned to the Bruins' American Hockey League (AHL) affiliate, the Providence Bruins. Caron maintained his scoring touch in the AHL and appeared in 11 games over two call-ups with the Bruins before March 2, 2015, when he was traded )along with a sixth-round pick in the 2016 NHL entry draft) to the Colorado Avalanche in exchange for Maxime Talbot and Paul Carey. Caron made his Avalanche debut on March 4, 2015, in a 3–1 victory over the Pittsburgh Penguins. Initially promoted to play on the top scoring lines, Caron was unable to produce and endured a diminishing role to end the season, going scoreless in 19 games with the Avalanche. As an impending restricted free agent, Caron was not offered a new contract by Colorado, after which he became a free agent.

On July 2, 2015, Caron signed a one-year, two-way contract with the St. Louis Blues. At the conclusion of his contract with the Blues, Caron was not extended and left as a free agent. On September 25, 2017, Caron accepted an AHL invitation to attend the Toronto Marlies' 2017 training camp. On October 9, he signed with Krefeld Pinguine of the Deutsche Eishockey Liga (DEL). He was limited to just 8 games with Krefeld due to injury, posting 10 points.

In the following 2018–19 season, Caron returned for his second campaign with Krefeld. He continued to display his offensive prowess in the DEL, collecting 11 points in 12 games before leaving the club to take up a two-year contract with Russian outfit, HC Sibir Novosibirsk of the Kontinental Hockey League, on November 2, 2018.

On February 13, 2020, Caron left German club, Schwenninger Wild Wings of the Deutsche Eishockey Liga and joined Swiss club, Genève-Servette HC of the National League (NL) to provide depth for the remainder of the regular season and the playoffs.

As a free agent into the 2020–21 season, Caron extended his European career by signing with Austrian club, EC VSV of the ICE Hockey League (ICEHL) on November 3, 2020. In appearing on Villach's top scoring line, Caron regained his scoring touch in registering 10 goals and 25 points in 37 games.

Having concluded his contract with EC VSV, Caron was signed as a free agent to a one-year contract with rival ICEHL club, the Vienna Capitals, on July 30, 2021. However prior to the commencement of the 2021–22 season, Caron left the club without featuring, opting to conclude his 11 year professional career and return to North America on September 10, 2021.

== International play ==
Medal record

Representing Canada

Ice hockey

World Junior Championships
Silver medal – second place	2010 Canada	

Caron played for Canada at the 2010 World Junior Championships in Saskatchewan. He won a silver medal with the team while scoring four assists.

== Career statistics ==
=== Regular season and playoffs ===
			Regular season					Playoffs
Season	Team	League	GP	G	A	Pts	PIM	GP	G	A	Pts	PIM
2006–07	Rimouski Océanic	QMJHL	59	18	22	40	41	—	—	—	—	—
2007–08	Rimouski Océanic	QMJHL	46	20	23	43	42	9	3	1	4	18
2008–09	Rimouski Océanic	QMJHL	56	36	31	67	66	13	6	5	11	16
2009–10	Rimouski Océanic	QMJHL	20	9	11	20	8	—	—	—	—	—
2009–10	Rouyn–Noranda Huskies	QMJHL	23	17	16	33	16	11	7	11	18	15
2010–11	Boston Bruins	NHL	23	3	4	7	6	—	—	—	—	—
2010–11	Providence Bruins	AHL	47	12	16	28	16	—	—	—	—	—
2011–12	Boston Bruins	NHL	48	7	8	15	14	2	0	0	0	0
2011–12	Providence Bruins	AHL	17	4	9	13	10	—	—	—	—	—
2012–13	Providence Bruins	AHL	47	11	7	18	38	12	2	7	9	10
2012–13	Boston Bruins	NHL	17	1	2	3	4	—	—	—	—	—
2013–14	Boston Bruins	NHL	35	1	2	3	36	7	1	0	1	4
2014–15	Boston Bruins	NHL	11	0	0	0	16	—	—	—	—	—
2014–15	Providence Bruins	AHL	23	9	9	18	10	—	—	—	—	—
2014–15	Colorado Avalanche	NHL	19	0	0	0	2	—	—	—	—	—
2015–16	Chicago Wolves	AHL	70	17	19	36	115	—	—	—	—	—
2015–16	St. Louis Blues	NHL	4	0	0	0	0	—	—	—	—	—
2016–17	Chicago Wolves	AHL	57	5	20	25	47	9	0	1	1	2
2017–18	Krefeld Pinguine	DEL	8	6	4	10	35	—	—	—	—	—
2018–19	Krefeld Pinguine	DEL	12	5	6	11	10	—	—	—	—	—
2018–19	Sibir Novosibirsk	KHL	33	5	7	12	29	—	—	—	—	—
2019–20	Schwenninger Wild Wings	DEL	24	9	3	12	20	—	—	—	—	—
2019–20	Genève–Servette HC	NL	4	1	0	1	2	—	—	—	—	—
2020–21	EC VSV	ICEHL	37	10	15	25	67	5	1	4	5	4
NHL totals			157	12	16	28	78	9	1	0	1	4

=== International ===
Year	Team	Event	Result	GP	G	A	Pts	PIM
2007	Canada	IH18	4th	4	1	0	1	4
2010	Canada	WJC	2nd place, silver medalist(s)	6	0	4	4	6
Junior totals				10	1	4	5	10

Awards and achievements
Preceded by Joe Colborne	Boston Bruins first-round draft pick 2009	Succeeded by Tyler Seguin
