= 2009 Memorial Cup =

Canadian junior men's ice hockey championship

2009 Mastercard Memorial Cup

Tournament details
- Venue(s): Colisée de Rimouski; Rimouski, Quebec
- Dates: May 15–24, 2009
- Teams: 4
- Host team: Rimouski Océanic (QMJHL)
- TV partners: Rogers Sportsnet (Canada-English); RDS (Canada-French); NHL Network (USA)

Final positions
- Champions: Windsor Spitfires (OHL) (1st title)
- Runners-up: Kelowna Rockets (WHL)

Tournament statistics
- Games played: 9
- Attendance: 41,440 (4,604 per game)
- Scoring leader: Jamie Benn (Rockets) (9 points)

Awards
- MVP: Taylor Hall (Spitfires)

The Memorial Cup trophy

The 2009 Memorial Cup was a four-team round-robin format ice hockey tournament played during May 2009 in Rimouski, Quebec. It was the 91st annual Memorial Cup competition and determined the major junior ice hockey champion of the Canadian Hockey League (CHL). The Quebec Major Junior Hockey League announced on April 3, 2008, that the Rimouski Océanic were chosen to host the event at the Colisée de Rimouski. Other participants include the Windsor Spitfires, champions of the Ontario Hockey League, the Drummondville Voltigeurs, champions of the Quebec Major Junior Hockey League, and the Kelowna Rockets, champions of the Western Hockey League.

Five other QMJHL teams submitted a bid to host the event, including the Chicoutimi Saguenéens, Halifax Mooseheads, Lewiston Maineiacs, Shawinigan Cataractes, and the St. John's Fog Devils. The Maineiacs bid partnered with the American Hockey League's Portland Pirates, with a plan to host the event in Portland's Cumberland County Civic Center. The QMJHL announced a five-member independent selection committee to evaluate the bids, headed by former New Brunswick Premier Bernard Lord.

The tournament began on May 15, 2009 with Kelowna beating Rimouski 4–1. Windsor defeated Rimouski in the tiebreaker and Drummondville in the semifinal, becoming just the second team since the current Memorial Cup tournament format was adopted in 1983 to reach the final after losing its first two games. Windsor then captured the Memorial Cup, defeating Kelowna 4–1 on May 24, 2009, becoming the first team in Memorial Cup history to win the tournament after starting 0–2, and also the first to win coming out of the tiebreaker.

== Tournament ==
All times listed are Eastern Daylight Time (UTC−4).

=== Round robin ===
Pos	Team	Pld	W	L	GF	GA	GD	
1	Kelowna Rockets (WHL)	3	2	1	11	7	+4	Advanced directly to the championship game
2	Drummondville Voltigeurs (QMJHL)	3	2	1	10	10	0	Advanced to the semifinal game
3	Windsor Spitfires (OHL) (Note: Windsor finished 4th based on head-to-head round robin matchups but defeated Rimouski in the tiebreaker game.)	3	1	2	8	9	−1	Advanced to the tiebreaker
4	Rimouski Océanic (host/QMJHL)	3	1	2	8	11	−3	Advanced to the tiebreaker

==== Results ====
May 15	Kelowna Rockets	4–1	Rimouski Océanic	Colisée de Rimouski	Recap
Tyler Myers (1) - 6:33		First period	No scoring
Jamie Benn (1) - pp - 4:33; Ian Duval (1) - 5:52		Second period	No scoring
Lucas Bloodoff (1) - 1:29		Third period	13:04 - Philippe Cornet (1)
Mark Guggenberger (19 saves / 20 shots)		Goalie stats	Maxim Gougeon (38 saves / 42 shots)

May 16	Drummondville Voltigeurs	3–2	OT	Windsor Spitfires	Colisée de Rimouski	Recap
No scoring		First period		No scoring
No scoring		Second period		19:59 - pp - Adam Henrique (1)
Gabriel Dumont (1) - 7:59; Philippe Lefebvre (1) - 14:07		Third period		11:48 - Adam Henrique (2)
Maxime Frenette (1) - 8:56		First overtime period		No scoring
Marco Cousineau (33 saves / 35 shots)		Goalie stats		Andrew Engelage (30 saves / 33 shots)

May 17	Rimouski Océanic	5–4	Windsor Spitfires	Colisée de Rimouski	Recap
No scoring		First period	No scoring
Patrice Cormier (1) - pp - 3:18; Jordan Caron (1) - 10:45; Patrick Delisle-Houde (1) - 14:48; Luca Cunti (1) - 16:32		Second period	6:19 - pp - Ryan Ellis (1); 08:50 - sh - Dale Mitchell (1); 18:22 - Andrei Loktionov (1)
Logan MacMillan (1) - sh - 0:34		Third period	9:34 - Andrei Loktionov (2)
Maxim Gougeon (35 saves / 39 shots)		Goalie stats	Andrew Engelage (20 saves / 25 shots)

May 18	Drummondville Voltigeurs	4–6	Kelowna Rockets	Colisée de Rimouski	Recap
Yannick Riendeau (1) - 14:27; Marc-Olivier Vachon (1) - pp - 17:10		First period	4:02 - sh - Jamie Benn (2)
Marc-Antoine Desnoyers (1) - 9:47		Second period	9:09 - Cody Almond 1; 18:47 - Jamie Benn (3)
Marc-Olivier Vachon (2) - pp - 7:23		Third period	9:26 - pp - Jamie Benn (4); 11:41 - Jamie Benn (5); 18:29 - Cody Almond (2)
Marco Cousineau (17 saves / 23 shots)		Goalie stats	Mark Guggenberger (18 saves / 22 shots)

May 19	Windsor Spitfires	2–1	Kelowna Rockets	Colisée de Rimouski	Recap
No scoring		First period	No scoring
Taylor Hall (1) - 16:21		Second period	7:33 - pp - Kyle St.Denis (1)
Ryan Ellis (2) - 4:13		Third period	No scoring
Andrew Engelage (16 saves / 17 shots)		Goalie stats	Mark Guggenberger (32 saves / 34 shots)

May 20	Rimouski Océanic	2–3	OT	Drummondville Voltigeurs	Colisée de Rimouski	Recap
No scoring		First period		No scoring
Luca Cunti (2) - 1:39		Second period		6:07 - Jonathan Brunelle (1); 11:56 - pp - Dmitry Kulikov (1)
Patrice Cormier (2) - pp - 5:23		Third period		No scoring
No scoring		First overtime period		13:23 - Gabriel Dumont (2)
Maxim Gougeon (17 saves / 20 shots)		Goalie stats		Marco Cousineau (39 saves / 41 shots)

=== Tiebreaker ===
May 21	Windsor Spitfires	6–4	Rimouski Océanic	Colisée de Rimouski	Recap
Eric Wellwood (1) - 7:13; Scott Timmins (1) - 8:30		First period	8:02 - Sébastien Piché (1); 12:47 - pp - Jordan Caron (2); 16:15 - Emmanuel Boudreau (1)
No scoring		Second period	17:25 - pp - Patrice Cormier (3)
Dale Mitchell (2) - 4:11; Dale Mitchell (3) - pp - 6:00; Dale Mitchell (4) - pp - 7:44; Greg Nemisz (1) - pp - 19:59		Third period	No scoring
Andrew Engelage (17 saves / 21 shots)		Goalie stats	Maxim Gougeon (31 saves / 37 shots)

=== Semifinal ===
May 22	Windsor Spitfires	3–2	OT	Drummondville Voltigeurs	Colisée de Rimouski	Recap
Taylor Hall (2) - 15:47; Ben Shutron (1) - 18:02		First period		No scoring
No scoring		Second period		1:13 - Samson Mahbod (1); 15:10 - pp - Yannick Riendeau (2)
No scoring		Third period		No scoring
Adam Henrique (3) - 4:31		First overtime period		No scoring
Andrew Engelage (19 saves / 21 shots)		Goalie stats		Marco Cousineau (44 saves / 47 shots)

=== Final ===
May 24	Windsor Spitfires	4–1	Kelowna Rockets	Colisée de Rimouski	Recap
Adam Henrique (4) - 3:22; Dale Mitchell (5) - 4:58; Rob Kwiet (1) - pp - 7:11		First period	No scoring
Ryan Ellis (3) - 12:46		Second period	0:08 - pp - Colin Long (1)
No scoring		Third period	No scoring
Andrew Engelage (21 saves / 22 shots)		Goalie stats	Mark Guggenberger (0 saves / 3 shots); Adam Brown (24 saves / 25 shots)

== Statistical leaders ==
=== Skaters ===
These are the top skaters based on points. If the list exceeds ten skaters because of a tie in points, all of the tied skaters are shown.

Player	Tea	GP	G	A	Pts	PIM
Jamie Benn	Kelowna Rockets	4	5	4	9	8
Adam Henrique	Windsor Spitfires	6	4	5	9	11
Yannick Riendeau	Drummondville Voltigeurs	4	2	6	8	2
Taylor Hall	Windsor Spitfires	6	2	6	8	8
Andrei Loktionov	Windsor Spitfires	6	2	5	7	0
Greg Nemisz	Windsor Spitfires	6	1	6	7	2
Dale Mitchell	Windsor Spitfires	6	5	1	6	2
Mark Cundari	Windsor Spitfires	6	0	5	5	6
Patrice Cormier	Rimouski Océanic	4	3	1	4	8
Ryan Ellis	Windsor Spitfires	6	3	1	4	4

GP = Games played; G = Goals; A = Assists; Pts = Points; PIM = Penalty minutes

=== Goaltending ===
This is a combined table of the top goaltenders based on goals against average and save percentage with at least sixty minutes played. The table is sorted by GAA.

Player	Team	GP	W	L	SA	GA	GAA	SV%	SO	Min
Andrew Engelage	Windsor Spitfires	6	4	2	139	16	2.58	.885	0	372:04
Marco Cousineau	Drummondville Voltigeurs	4	2	2	146	13	2.94	.911	0	265:27
Mark Guggenberger	Kelowna Rockets	4	2	2	79	10	3.21	.873	0	187:04
Maxim Gougeon	Rimouski Océanic	4	1	3	138	17	4.03	.877	0	253:23

GP = Games played; W = Wins; L = Losses; SA = Shots against; GA = Goals against; GAA = Goals against average; SV% = Save percentage; SO = Shutouts; TOI = Time on ice (minutes:seconds)

== Tournament awards ==
Award	Recipient
Stafford Smythe Memorial Trophy (Most Valuable Player)	Taylor Hall, Windsor
George Parsons Trophy (Most Sportsmanlike)	Yannick Riendeau, Drummondville
Hap Emms Memorial Trophy (Top Goaltender)	Marco Cousineau, Drummondville
Ed Chynoweth Trophy (Leading Scorer)	Jamie Benn, Kelowna

All-Star team	Position
Marco Cousineau, Drummondville	G
Ryan Ellis, Windsor	D
Tyler Myers, Kelowna	D
Jamie Benn, Kelowna	F
Patrice Cormier, Rimouski	F
Taylor Hall, Windsor	F

== Rosters ==
=== Drummondville Voltigeurs (QMJHL) ===
- Head coach: Guy Boucher

Pos.	No.	Player
GK	33	Marco Cousineau
GK	35	Antoine Tardif
D	3	Marc-Érik Ouellet
D	6	Marc-Antoine Desnoyers
D	8	Ryan McKiernan
D	9	Patrik Prokop
D	15	Jeff Marcoux
D	23	Charles Landry
D	26	Olivier Hotte
D	29	Dmitri Kulikov
D	82	Andrew Randazzo
F	7	Sean Couturier
F	10	Marc-Olivier Vachon
F	11	Benoît Lévesque
F	13	Yannick Riendeau
F	17	Dany Massé
F	24	Philippe Bergeron
F	28	Samson Mahbod
F	40	Gabriel Dumont
F	70	Mike Hoffman
F	81	Jonathan Brunelle
F	83	Christopher DiDomenico
F	89	Maxime Frenette
F	94	Philippe Lefebvre

=== Kelowna Rockets (WHL) ===
- Head coach: Ryan Huska

Pos.	No.	Player
GK	30	Mark Guggenberger
GK	31	Adam Brown
D	2	Collin Bowman
D	3	Tyler Myers
D	4	Tyson Barrie
D	7	Aaron Borejko
D	8	Curt Gogol
D	26	Tysen Dowzak
F	9	Štěpán Novotný
F	10	Evan Bloodoff
F	11	Colin Long
F	12	Cody Almond
F	14	Jamie Benn
F	15	Brandon McMillan
F	16	Spencer Main
F	17	Lucas Bloodoff
F	18	Shane McColgan
F	19	Ian Duval
F	22	Mikael Backlund
F	23	Kyle St. Denis
F	24	Mitchell Callahan
F	27	Ryley Grantham
F	28	Kyle Verdino

=== Rimouski Océanic (Host) ===
- Head coach: Clement Jodoin

Pos.	No.	Player
GK	31	Maxim Gougeon
GK	38	Matthew Dopud
D	3	Marc-André Bourdon
D	7	Sebastien Piche
D	14	Gleason Fournier
D	17	William Plourde
D	18	Ryan Kavanagh
D	20	Alexandre Brunet
D	21	Emmanuel Boudreau
D	24	Maxime Ouimet
F	8	Patrick Delisle-Houde
F	11	Logan MacMillan
F	15	Philippe Cornet
F	16	Olivier Fortier
F	19	Keven Veilleux
F	23	Mathieu Asselin
F	26	Alexandre Durette
F	27	Jordan Caron
F	55	Frédéric Desrochers
F	65	Ilya Silik
F	71	Félix Lefrançois
F	75	Nicholas Samoluk
F	79	Luca Cunti
F	90	Patrice Cormier

=== Windsor Spitfires (OHL) ===
- Head coach: Bob Boughner

Pos.	No.	Player
GK	1	Andrew Engelage
GK	30	Josh Unice
GK	34	Steve Gleeson
D	5	Ron Soucie
D	6	Ryan Ellis
D	7	Adam Wallace
D	13	Rob Kwiet
D	17	Jesse Blacker
D	42	Ben Shutron
D	51	Mark Cundari
D	55	Harry Young
D	81	Patrick Moran
F	4	Taylor Hall
F	14	Adam Henrique
F	16	Ben Dubois
F	19	Lane MacDermid
F	22	Richard Greenop
F	25	James Woodcroft
F	29	Conor O'Donnell
F	44	Justin Shugg
F	61	Austin Watson
F	64	Greg Nemisz
F	67	Eric Wellwood
F	71	Dale Mitchell
F	77	Scott Timmins
F	90	Andrei Loktionov

== Road to the Cup ==
=== OHL playoffs ===
Conference Quarterfinals	Conference Semifinals
1	Belleville	4
8	Sudbury	2
1	Belleville	4
6	Niagara	1
3	Ottawa	3
6	Niagara	4
Eastern
2	Brampton	4
7	Peterborough	0
2	Brampton	4
4	Mississauga	2
4	Mississauga	4
5	Barrie	1
1	Windsor	4
8	Owen Sound	0
1	Windsor	4
4	Plymouth	2
4	Plymouth	4
5	Sarnia	1
Western
2	London	4
7	Erie	1
2	London	4
3	Saginaw	0
3	Saginaw	4
6	Guelph	0

Conference Finals
1	Belleville	2
2	Brampton	4
1	Windsor	4
2	London	1

OHL Championship
E2	Brampton	1
W1	Windsor	4

=== QMJHL playoffs ===
First Round
1C	Drummondville	4
4C	Lewiston	0
2O	Montreal	4
3O	Rouyn-Noranda	2
1A	Moncton	4
4A	P.E.I.	1
2E	Rimouski	4
3E	Chicoutimi	0
1E	Quebec	4
4E	Baie-Comeau	1
2A	Cape Breton	4
3A	Saint John	0
1O	Gatineau	4
5A	Acadie-Bathurst	1
2C	Shawinigan	4
3C	Victoriaville	0

Quarterfinals
1	Drummondville	4
8	Montreal	0
2	Moncton	1
7	Rimouski	4
3	Quebec	4
6	Cape Breton	3
4	Gatineau	1
5	Shawinigan	4

Semifinals
1	Drummondville	4
7	Rimouski	0
3	Quebec	1
5	Shawinigan	4

QMJHL Championships
1	Drummondville	4
5	Shawinigan	3

=== WHL playoffs ===
Conference Quarterfinals	Conference Semifinals
1	Calgary	4
8	Edmonton	0
1	Calgary	4
7	Lethbridge	0
2	Saskatoon	3
7	Lethbridge	4
Eastern
3	Brandon	4
6	Kootenay	0
3	Brandon	4
5	Medicine Hat	0
4	Swift Current	3
5	Medicine Hat	4
1	Vancouver	4
8	Prince George	0
1	Vancouver	4
4	Spokane	3
4	Spokane	4
5	Seattle	1
Western
2	Tri-City	4
7	Everett	1
2	Tri-City	2
3	Kelowna	4
3	Kelowna	4
6	Kamloops	0

Conference Finals
1	Calgary	4
3	Brandon	0
1	Vancouver	2
3	Kelowna	4

WHL Championship
E1	Calgary	2
W3	Kelowna	4
