= Adam Henrique =

Canadian ice hockey player (born 1990)

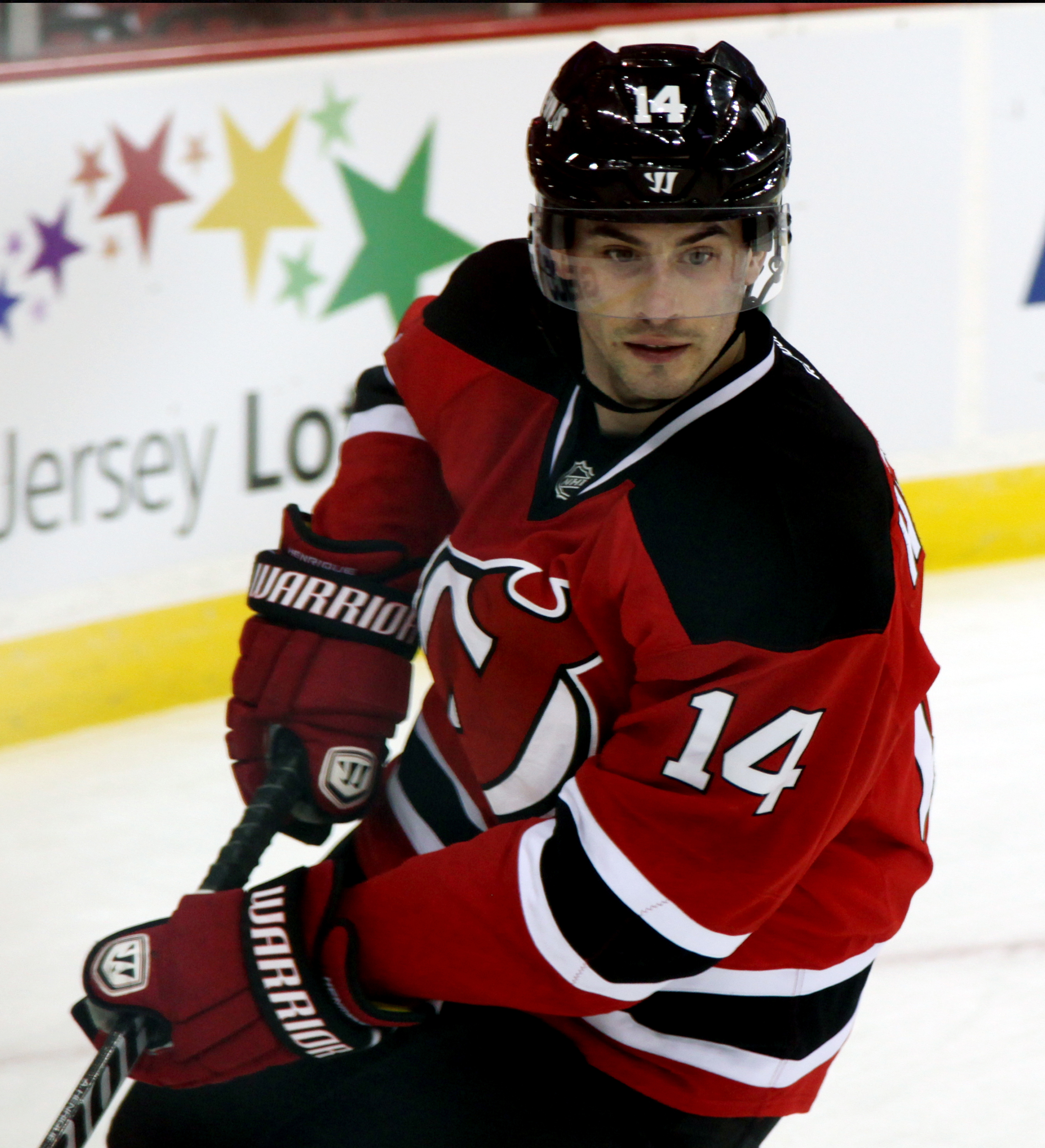
- Henrique with the New Jersey Devils in 2013
- Born: February 6, 1990 (age 36) Brantford, Ontario, Canada
- Height: 6 ft 0 in (183 cm)
- Weight: 195 lb (88 kg; 13 st 13 lb)
- Position: Centre
- Shoots: Left
- NHL team Former teams: Free agent New Jersey Devils; Anaheim Ducks; Edmonton Oilers
- National team: Canada
- NHL draft: 82nd overall, 2008; New Jersey Devils
- Playing career: 2010–present

Adam Henrique (born February 6, 1990) is a Canadian professional ice hockey player who is a centre and an unrestricted free agent. He most recently played for the Edmonton Oilers of the National Hockey League (NHL). He was selected 82nd overall at the 2008 NHL entry draft by the New Jersey Devils. Henrique previously played for the Devils and Anaheim Ducks. He played Major Junior hockey with the Windsor Spitfires of the Ontario Hockey League (OHL) where he was a member of the team that won back-to-back Memorial Cups in 2009 and 2010.

== Early life ==
Henrique was born in Brantford, Ontario, to Joe and Teresa Henrique, the second-oldest of four brothers. His father is Portuguese and his mother is Polish. His paternal grandparents speak Portuguese; his father also speaks some Portuguese, while his mother speaks Polish. Joe Henrique farms 50 acres (20 ha) of tobacco and ginseng in Burford, Ontario, about 90 minutes southwest of Toronto.

== Playing career ==
=== Junior ===
Henrique grew up in the small rural town of Burford, Ontario, playing minor ice hockey for the Burford Coyotes of the Ontario Minor Hockey Association (OMHA) Southern Counties League. He played in the 2003 Quebec International Pee-Wee Hockey Tournament with the Brantford 99ers. He then graduated to the AAA Brantford 99ers of the Pavilion League where he played until Minor Midget in the 2005–06 season.

In May 2006, Henrique was selected by the Windsor Spitfires of the Ontario Hockey League (OHL) in the second round, 24th overall of the 2006 OHL Priority Selection Draft. In his OHL rookie season, Henrique was a member of the gold medal-winning Team Ontario U-17 team at the Canada Winter Games in Whitehorse, Yukon, in February 2007. He then went on to win the Memorial Cup with Windsor in both 2009 and in 2010. He was also named played in the 2010 OHL All-Star Game. In 2014, his jersey number 14 was retired by the Spitfires.

=== Professional ===
==== New Jersey Devils ====
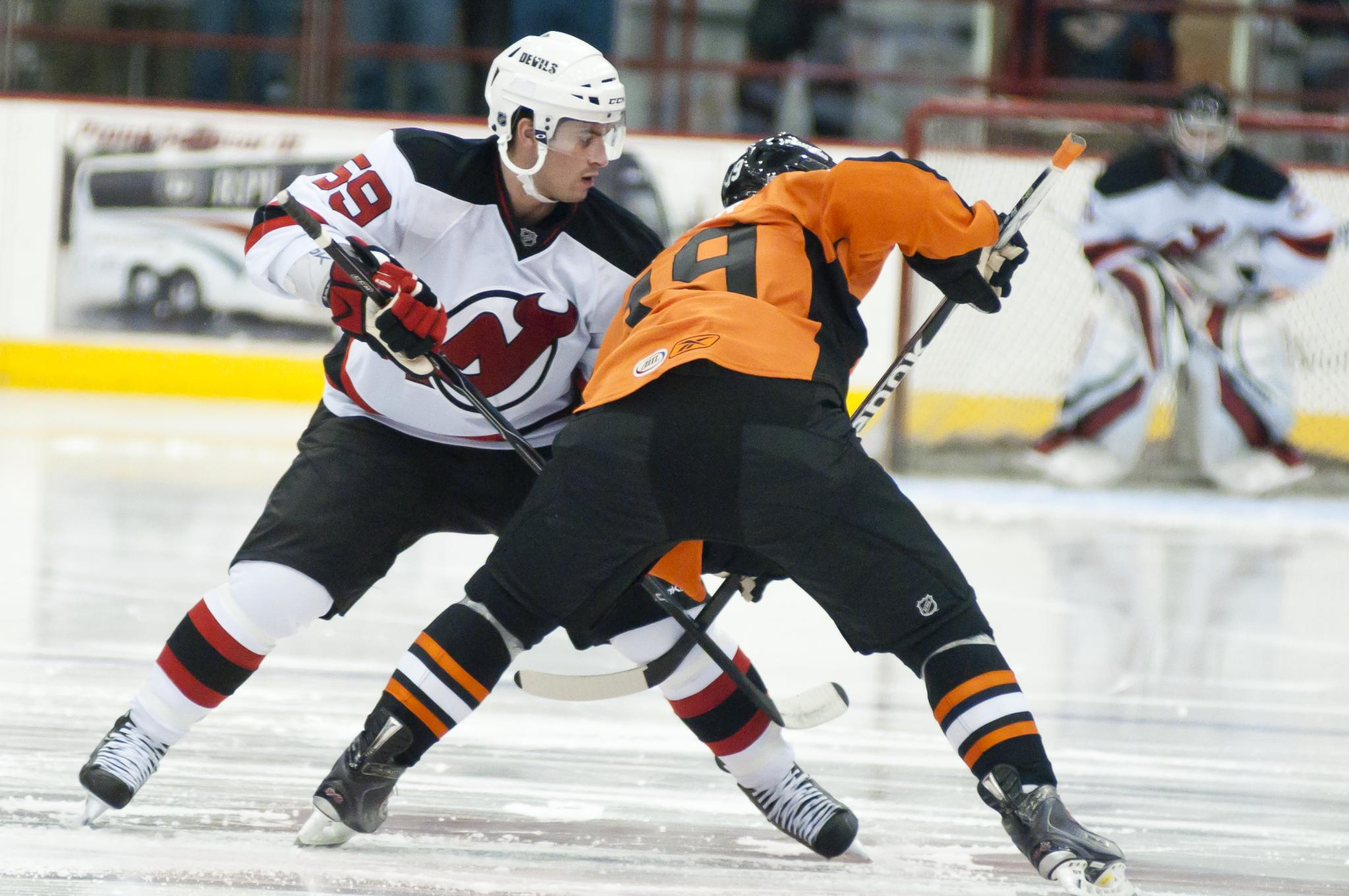
Henrique with the Albany Devils in 2010

Henrique was selected by the New Jersey Devils of the National Hockey League (NHL) in the third round, 82nd overall, of the 2008 NHL entry draft. During the 2010–11 season, Henrique played with the Devils' American Hockey League (AHL) affiliate, the Albany Devils. He finished the season as the team's second leading scorer. Henrique was recalled by the Devils and on April 11, 2011, Henrique made his NHL debut for the Devils in a game against the Boston Bruins.

The following season he scored his first career NHL goal on November 3, 2011, against Sergei Bobrovsky of the Philadelphia Flyers. Two nights later, Henrique scored two breakaway goals against the Winnipeg Jets, the second goal being the game winner in overtime. With the absence of centre Travis Zajac due to injury, Henrique was matched up with wingers Zach Parise and Ilya Kovalchuk on the team's first line for a short time. He was named the NHL's Rookie of the Month for December 2011. Henrique recorded his first career NHL fight on January 10, 2012, against the Calgary Flames. The same night, he also secured his first Gordie Howe hat trick (a goal, an assist and a fight in the same game). He fought Flames' captain Jarome Iginla in the first period and went on to record an assist and score a shorthanded goal in the second period. Iginla also recorded a Gordie Howe hat trick in the game, with a goal and two assists in addition to his fight against Henrique.

Henrique was selected to compete in the NHL All-Star Rookie SuperSkills Competition in Ottawa on January 28, 2012. However, he did not participate due to a groin injury he received in a game against the Edmonton Oilers on January 11. He missed two games due to the injury and returned in a game against the Buffalo Sabres; he "tweaked" his groin again that night, initially causing him to withdraw from the competition. Rookie teammate Adam Larsson also pulled out of the game due to wrist soreness. Henrique was replaced by New York Rangers left winger Carl Hagelin, while Larsson with Montreal Canadiens defenceman Raphael Diaz. He finished his rookie season with 16 goals and 51 points in 74 games.

In the Eastern Conference Quarterfinals of the 2012 Stanley Cup playoffs, in Game 7 against the Florida Panthers, Henrique scored two goals, the latter being the double-overtime winner sending the Devils to the Conference Semifinals. In doing so, he became just the second rookie in League history to score an overtime-winning goal in a Game 7. On May 25, Henrique scored 1:03 into overtime to eliminate the New York Rangers and send the Devils to the 2012 Stanley Cup Final. This made him the first rookie to score two series-clinching overtime goals in the same playoffs. In the finals against the Los Angeles Kings, he scored the game winner for the Devils in Game 4. However, the Kings would prevail and win the Stanley Cup. At the end of the season, Henrique was one of the final three nominees for the Calder Memorial Trophy, awarded to the NHL's top rookie. The award, however, ultimately went to Gabriel Landeskog of the Colorado Avalanche. He was named to the NHL's 2012 All-Rookie Team.

The start of the 2012–13 season was put on hold due to the 2012–13 NHL lockout and Henrique was assigned to Albany for its duration. He suffered a damaged ligament in his thumb and underwent surgery in November, forcing him to miss six weeks. Once NHL play returned, Henrique was recalled and scored 11 goals and 16 points in 42 games. On August 26, 2013, Henrique, as a restricted free agent, signed a six-year, $24 million contract with New Jersey. During the 2013–14 season Henrique tied a Devils record for consecutive games scoring a goal with six in March 2014. Henrique finished the 2014–15 season as the Devils' leading scorer. However, he was limited to scoring just 16 goals as he spent half the season playing with two torn ligaments and a bone chip in his left wrist. He underwent surgery to repair the injury on April 16, 2015.

During the 2015–16 season, Henrique reached 30 goals for the first time. He scored two in the final game of the season against the Toronto Maple Leafs on April 9, 2016 to reach the mark. He missed some time due to injury in December and January and struggled upon his return. In the 2016–17 season, on October 29, 2016, Henrique scored his 100th career goal against Andrei Vasilevskiy in a 3–1 win over the Tampa Bay Lightning in New Jersey. His season started off slow, despite playing with Taylor Hall, with whom he had great success in Windsor with. Henrique improved as the season wore on, but slowed again towards the end. He finished the season with 20 goals and 40 points and played in all 82 games.

==== Anaheim Ducks ====
During the 2017–18 season, on November 30, 2017, Henrique was traded by the Devils, alongside Joseph Blandisi and a 2018 third-round pick to the Anaheim Ducks in exchange for Sami Vatanen and a conditional draft pick in 2019 or 2020. Henrique was acquired by the Ducks after injuries to centres Ryan Getzlaf and Ryan Kesler. He made his debut for the Ducks on December 1 against the Columbus Blue Jackets, registering an assist. The next night on December 2, Henrique scored his first goal as a Duck in a 3–2 loss to the Nashville Predators. When Henrique faced his former team for the first time on December 18, he was given a tribute video and an ovation from Devils fans. Despite a 5–3 Devils win, Henrique managed to score a goal by lifting the puck past Devils and former Ducks defenceman Vatanen. He finished the season with a combined 81 games between the two teams, scoring 24 goals and 50 points. Upon the return of Getzlaf and Kesler, Henrique was pushed down to the third line, which is where he played during the Ducks abbreviated postseason run where they were swept by the San Jose Sharks in four games.

On July 16, 2018, Henrique signed a five-year, $29.125 million contract extension with the Ducks. He played in all 82 games for the Ducks during the 2018–19 season, and in the pandemic-shortened 2019–20 season, he again played in all 71 games. He led the team in scoring during the 2019–20 season, registering 26 goals and 43 points. However, his poor play to begin the 2020–21 season saw Henrique scratched from the Ducks lineup for the first time in January 2021. His poor play continued, scoring three goals and four points in 16 games and the Ducks placed Henrique on waivers on February 20. He went unclaimed, but remained with the Ducks. Henrique had a bounce back year in the 2021–22 season scoring 19 goals and 42 points, good for second on the team, despite missing time with a lower body injury in December.

During the 2022–23 season, on December 17, 2023, Henrique recorded his first career hat trick in his 859th NHL game, a 5–1 win over the New Jersey Devils. He suffered a knee injury in a 6–1 loss to the Tampa Bay Lightning on February 22, 2023 that caused him to miss several games. He returned to the lineup on April 5 in a 3–1 loss to the Edmonton Oilers.

Henrique registered his 500th career point with an assist on Troy Terry's goal in a 5–3 win over the Nashville Predators on January 10, 2024. He played in 60 games with Anaheim during the 2023–24 season, scoring 18 goals and 42 points.

==== Edmonton Oilers ====
On March 6, 2024, in the final year of his contract with the now rebuilding Ducks and unexpected to re-sign with the team as the trade deadline approached, Henrique was traded to the Edmonton Oilers along with Sam Carrick in a pair of trades with Henrique getting swapped to the Tampa Bay Lightning first to limit the amount of Henrique's salary being taken on by Edmonton. The Ducks received a first-round draft pick in 2024 and a conditional fifth-round pick in 2025 in the exchange, with Tampa receiving a fourth-round pick in 2026 as compensation for alleviating a quarter of Henrique's salary. The Oilers made it to the Stanley Cup Final, but fell to the Florida Panthers in seven games. Henrique had seven points in the playoffs that season.

On July 1, 2024, Henrique signed a two-year, $6 million contract with the Oilers.

In his second season with the Oilers, Henrique recorded 27 points across 81 games in the regular season and 7 in 22 playoff games. The Oilers would make the final for the second consecutive year, marking Henrique's third trip to the Stanley Cup Finals. The Oilers would end up falling to the Florida Panthers for the second year in a row, this time falling in six games. Henrique had one assist in the six-game series.

Henrique played his 1,000th NHL game on October 21, 2025, becoming the first Edmonton Oiler to play in his thousandth while wearing an Oilers jersey.

Henrique ended a career-high 51-game goal drought when he scored the opening goal of an eventual 3-1 win over the Chicago Blackhawks on April 2, 2026.

== International play ==
Medal record

Men's ice hockey

Representing Canada

World Championships
Gold medal – first place	2021 Latvia	
Silver medal – second place	2019 Slovakia	

World Junior Championships
Silver medal – second place	2010 Saskatchewan	

Henrique first played at the international stage for Canada at the 2010 World Junior Championships, in Saskatchewan, Canada.

On April 29, 2019, Henrique was named to the Team Canada roster to make his full international debut at the 2019 IIHF World Championship held in Slovakia. Henrique helped Canada progress through to the playoff rounds before losing the final to Finland to finish with the silver medal on May 26, 2019. He finished the tournament posting 2 assists in 10 appearances.

In 2021, Henrique was again named to the Team Canada roster for the 2021 IIHF World Championship held in Slovakia. Henrique had an outstanding tournament, with 6 goals and 11 points in 10 games. Team Canada this time won the gold medal, defeating Finland in the final.

== Personal life ==
Henrique married Lauren Thomas, the daughter of former NHL player Steve Thomas in 2021.

== Career statistics ==
=== Regular season and playoffs ===
			Regular season					Playoffs
Season	Team	League	GP	G	A	Pts	PIM	GP	G	A	Pts	PIM
2005–06	Brantford 99ers AAA	AH U16	33	33	21	54	42	—	—	—	—	—
2005–06	Brantford Golden Eagles	MWJHL	1	1	0	1	0	—	—	—	—	—
2006–07	Windsor Spitfires	OHL	62	23	21	44	20	—	—	—	—	—
2007–08	Windsor Spitfires	OHL	66	20	24	44	28	5	2	3	5	4
2008–09	Windsor Spitfires	OHL	56	30	33	63	47	20	8	9	17	19
2009–10	Windsor Spitfires	OHL	54	38	39	77	57	19	20	5	25	12
2010–11	Albany Devils	AHL	73	25	25	50	26	—	—	—	—	—
2010–11	New Jersey Devils	NHL	1	0	0	0	0	—	—	—	—	—
2011–12	Albany Devils	AHL	3	0	1	1	2	—	—	—	—	—
2011–12	New Jersey Devils	NHL	74	16	35	51	7	24	5	8	13	11
2012–13	Albany Devils	AHL	16	5	3	8	12	—	—	—	—	—
2012–13	New Jersey Devils	NHL	42	11	5	16	16	—	—	—	—	—
2013–14	New Jersey Devils	NHL	77	25	18	43	20	—	—	—	—	—
2014–15	New Jersey Devils	NHL	75	16	27	43	34	—	—	—	—	—
2015–16	New Jersey Devils	NHL	80	30	20	50	23	—	—	—	—	—
2016–17	New Jersey Devils	NHL	82	20	20	40	38	—	—	—	—	—
2017–18	New Jersey Devils	NHL	24	4	10	14	6	—	—	—	—	—
2017–18	Anaheim Ducks	NHL	57	20	16	36	14	4	0	0	0	0
2018–19	Anaheim Ducks	NHL	82	18	24	42	24	—	—	—	—	—
2019–20	Anaheim Ducks	NHL	71	26	17	43	22	—	—	—	—	—
2020–21	Anaheim Ducks	NHL	45	12	9	21	11	—	—	—	—	—
2021–22	Anaheim Ducks	NHL	58	19	23	42	14	—	—	—	—	—
2022–23	Anaheim Ducks	NHL	62	22	16	38	22	—	—	—	—	—
2023–24	Anaheim Ducks	NHL	60	18	24	42	33	—	—	—	—	—
2023–24	Edmonton Oilers	NHL	22	6	3	9	4	17	4	3	7	2
2024–25	Edmonton Oilers	NHL	81	12	15	27	16	22	4	3	7	4
2025–26	Edmonton Oilers	NHL	65	3	12	15	18	1	0	0	0	0
NHL totals			1,058	278	294	572	322	68	13	14	27	17

=== International ===
Year	Team	Event	Result	GP	G	A	Pts	PIM
2010	Canada	WJC	2nd place, silver medalist(s)	6	1	0	1	2
2019	Canada	WC	2nd place, silver medalist(s)	10	0	2	2	0
2021	Canada	WC	1st place, gold medalist(s)	10	6	5	11	0
Junior totals				6	1	0	1	2
Senior totals				20	6	7	13	0

== Awards and honours ==
Award	Year	Ref
OHL
Memorial Cup champion	2009, 2010	
All-Star Game	2010	
Wayne Gretzky 99 Award	2010	
NHL
Rookie of the Month (December)	2011	
All-Rookie Team	2012	
