= Taylor Hall =

Canadian ice hockey player (born 1991)

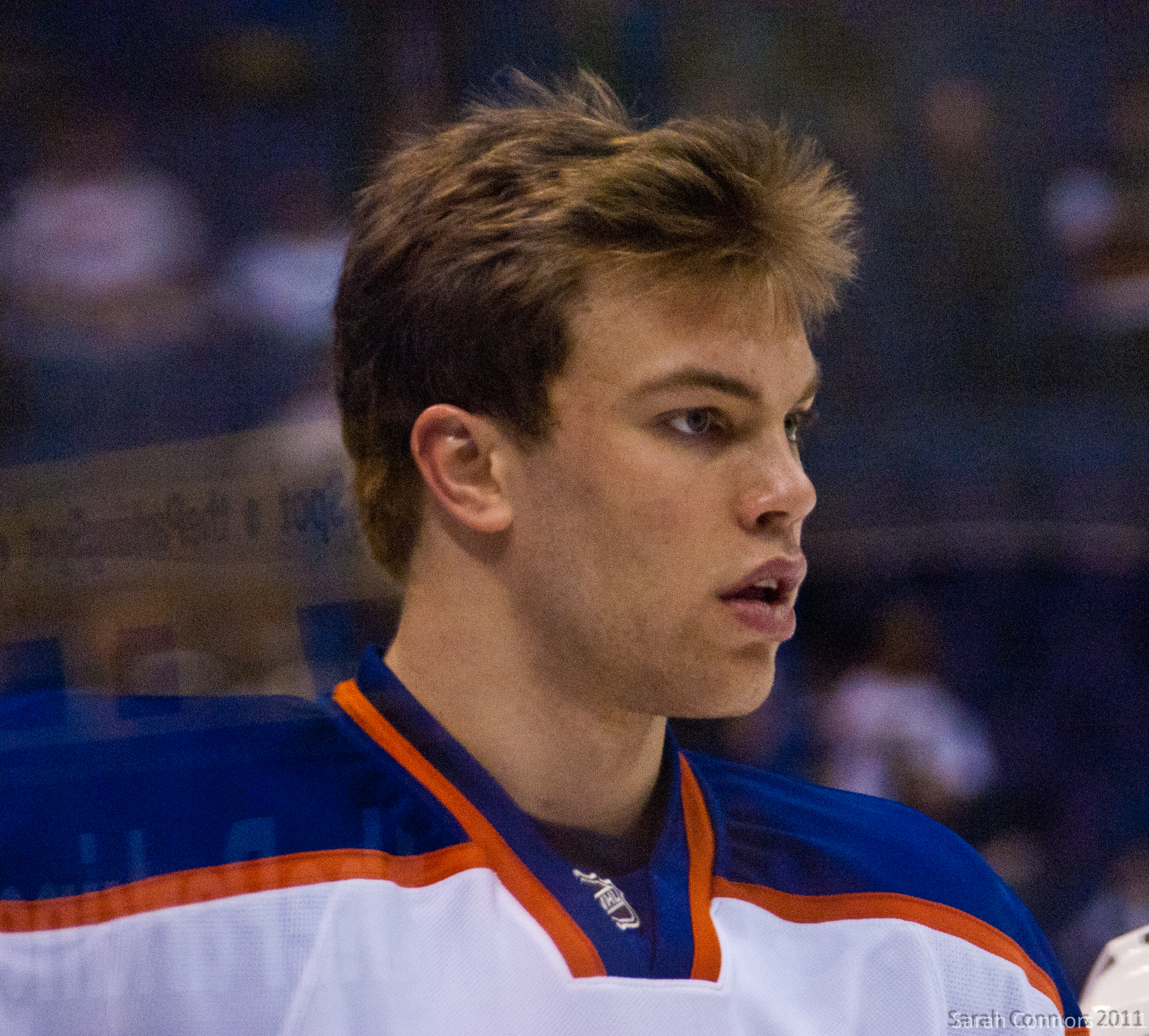
- Hall with the Edmonton Oilers in 2012
- Born: November 14, 1991 (age 35) Calgary, Alberta, Canada
- Height: 6 ft 1 in (185 cm)
- Weight: 210 lb (95 kg; 15 st 0 lb)
- Position: Forward
- Shoots: Left
- NHL team Former teams: Carolina Hurricanes; Edmonton Oilers; New Jersey Devils; Arizona Coyotes; Buffalo Sabres; Boston Bruins; Chicago Blackhawks
- National team: Canada
- NHL draft: 1st overall, 2010; Edmonton Oilers
- Playing career: 2010–present

Taylor Hall (born November 14, 1991) is a Canadian professional ice hockey player who is a forward for the Carolina Hurricanes of the National Hockey League (NHL). He was the first overall pick in the 2010 NHL entry draft selected by the Edmonton Oilers. He played the first six years of his career for the Oilers before spending the next four with the New Jersey Devils. Hall became more of a journeyman after his stint in New Jersey, however, as he also played for the Arizona Coyotes, Buffalo Sabres, Boston Bruins, and Chicago Blackhawks.

Hall had a highly successful junior career, helping the Ontario Hockey League (OHL)'s Windsor Spitfires to two consecutive Memorial Cup championships in 2009 and 2010. He won the Stafford Smythe Memorial Trophy as the most valuable player of the Memorial Cup tournament both years. Hall has been named to the NHL All-Star Game on five occasions. In his second season with the Devils, Hall won the Hart Memorial Trophy as the NHL's most valuable player, becoming the first Devils player in franchise history to win the award. Hall won the Stanley Cup with the Hurricanes in 2026, scoring the cup-clinching goal in game six.

== Early life ==
Hall was born in Calgary, the only child of Steve Hall and Kim Strba. His father was a former Canadian Football League (CFL) player for the Winnipeg Blue Bombers, Toronto Argonauts and Ottawa Rough Riders in the mid-1980s, after which he was a member of the Canadian national bobsleigh team. His mother introduced him to organized hockey at age five while his father maintained a backyard rink every winter which Hall and his friends practiced on relentlessly. His family moved to Kingston, Ontario, in 2005, where he attended high school at Frontenac Secondary School and later attended St. Anne's Catholic High School in Tecumseh, Ontario while with the Windsor Spitfires.

== Minor playing career ==
Hall started playing minor hockey in Calgary, Alberta. When he was 13, his family moved to Kingston, Ontario, where he continued to play. Hall captured a Bantam AAA Calgary city championship with the North East Canucks during the 2004–05 season. For the 2005–06 and 2006–07 seasons, Hall played Bantam and Minor Midget hockey for the Greater Kingston Predators of the ODMHA league. He was named to the ODMHA Midget AAA All-Star team. After the season, Hall was the second overall choice in the 2007 Ontario Hockey League (OHL) Priority Selection by the Windsor Spitfires.

== Junior playing career ==
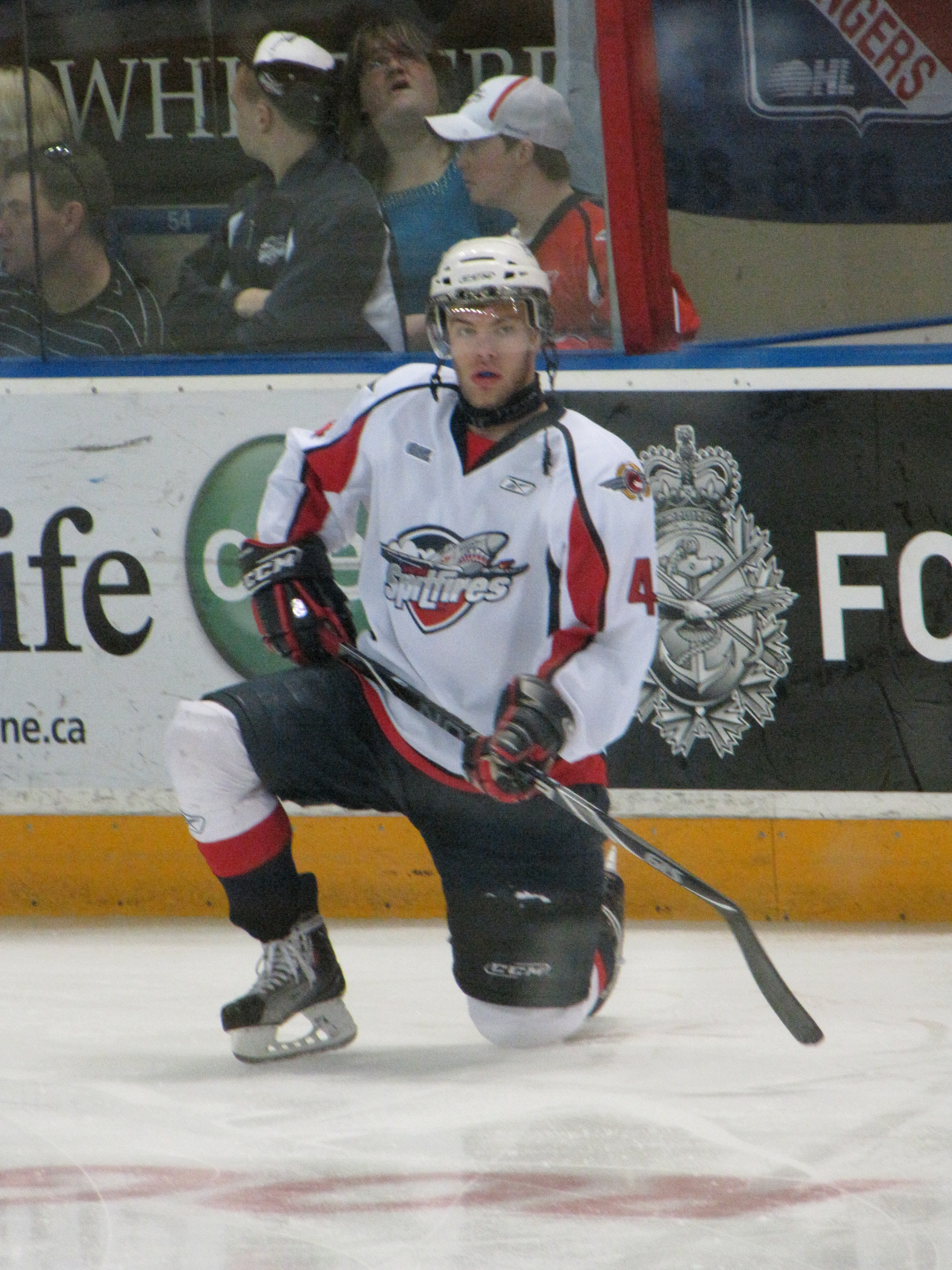
Hall playing in the OHL for the Windsor Spitfires during the 2010 playoffs

Hall made his OHL debut in 2007–08, scoring a team-high 45 goals and adding 39 assists for 84 points, which was third in team scoring. In March, he was named OHL Player of the Week twice (March 3 and March 10). He was named OHL and CHL Rookie of the Year after the season.

During the 2008–09 season, Hall was selected to represent the OHL in the ADT Canada-Russia Challenge. He scored 38 goals and added 52 assists to finish with 90 points. Windsor had a successful season on the ice, capturing the OHL Championship as well as the Memorial Cup. During the OHL playoffs, Hall scored 16 goals and added 20 assists while being awarded the Wayne Gretzky 99 Award as Playoff MVP. He scored the game-winning overtime goal in the fifth and deciding game of the OHL Finals against the Brampton Battalion to clinch the title. At the 2009 Memorial Cup, Hall recorded eight points in six games as the Spitfires defeated the Kelowna Rockets 4–1 in the final. After the tournament, Hall was awarded the Stafford Smythe Memorial Trophy as the tournament's most valuable player and was named to the tournament all-star team alongside teammate Ryan Ellis.

Though the odds of him playing in Russia were remote, Hall was drafted 89th overall in the 2009 KHL Junior Draft by Ak Bars Kazan. He was one of three Canadian junior players (all from the OHL) taken in the KHL draft, which begins selecting players one year younger than the NHL does. Hall was an early favourite to be the top pick in the 2010 NHL entry draft since entering the junior ranks. He was praised early in his junior career on Hockey Night in Canada by commentator Don Cherry during his "Coach's Corner" segment. Hall was also featured in a July 2008 issue of Sports Illustrated, profiling young athletes poised to star in their sports.

Hall finished the 2009–10 season tied for first place in the OHL with Tyler Seguin with 106 points (40 goals and 66 assists) to win the Eddie Powers Memorial Trophy alongside Seguin. Hall was instrumental in the Spitfires' 2010 J. Ross Robertson Cup championship, recording a playoff-leading 35 points in 19 playoff games. His teammate, Adam Henrique, won the Wayne Gretzky 99 Award, scoring 20 goals.

In May 2010, Hall helped lead the Spitfires to their second-straight Memorial Cup. With the victory, Hall was awarded his second-straight Stafford Smythe Memorial Trophy as tournament MVP (the first player in its history to repeat as a winner), the Ed Chynoweth Trophy as Memorial Cup scoring leader and a spot on the tournament all-star team for the second-straight year.

Hall was ranked as the top North American-based prospect by the NHL Central Scouting Bureau (CSB) in its 2009–10 midterm rankings. In the CSB's final rankings, he was overtaken by Tyler Seguin as the top-ranked North American-based prospect. Hall has cited Toronto Maple Leafs forward and 2009 NHL entry draft first overall pick John Tavares as a role model, both on and off the ice.

== Professional playing career ==
=== Edmonton Oilers (2010–2016) ===
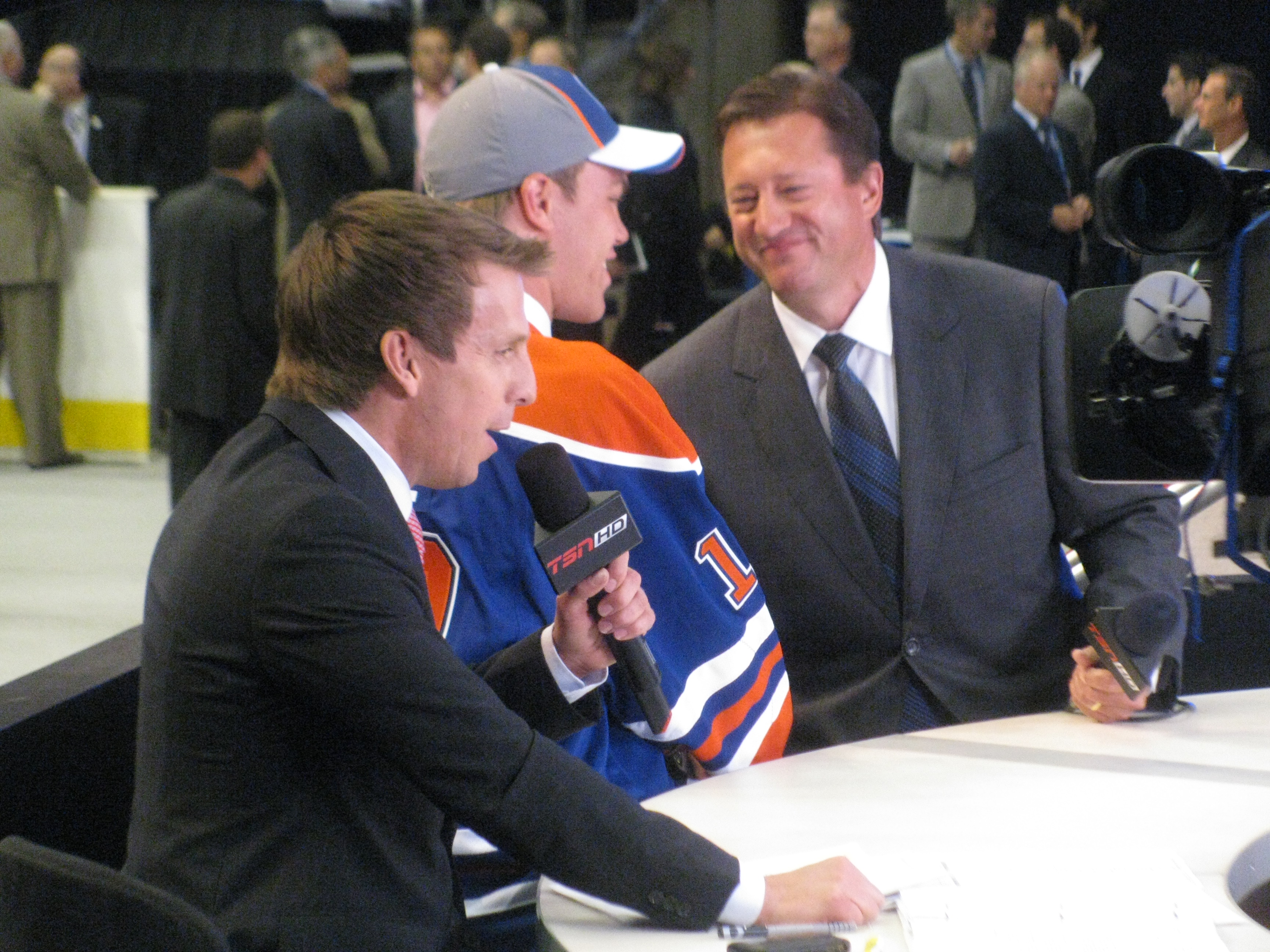
Hall with Steve Tambellini and James Duthie at the 2010 NHL entry draft. Hall was selected first overall at the 2010 draft.

Shortly after being selected first overall by the Edmonton Oilers in the 2010 NHL entry draft, Hall signed his first professional contract. The contract paid Hall the entry level maximum of $900,000 with the potential of an additional $2.85 million in performance bonuses. This was the second-most lucrative rookie contract in Oilers history.

Hall was given permission to wear the jersey number 4, which had belonged to former Oilers' player Kevin Lowe, who was then serving as the Oilers' president of hockey operations and who had been the only Oiler to wear the number 4 in its NHL history, despite the fact that Lowe's number 4 was not retired by the Oilers.

Hall made his NHL debut on October 7, 2010, as the Oilers defeated their Battle of Alberta rivals, the Calgary Flames, at Rexall Place. Hall's first NHL point, an assist, came in his second game, against the Florida Panthers on October 10; Shawn Horcoff redirected Hall's shot in front of the net. Hall's first NHL goal came on October 28 against Steve Mason of the Columbus Blue Jackets; Hall's former head coach with the Windsor Spitfires, Bob Boughner, was an assistant coach with Columbus at the time.

Hall was named to the 2011 NHL All-Star Game as a rookie; a newly-introduced format for the 2011 All-Star Game selected 12 rookies specifically to participate in the NHL All-Star Game SuperSkills Competition. Hall came in second place to Michael Grabner in the fastest skater SuperSkills Competition.

Hall scored his first NHL hat trick (and natural hat trick) against the Atlanta Thrashers on February 19, 2011: with the Oilers behind by two goals, Hall scored three consecutive power play goals in a span of 12:53 as the Oilers eventually won the game 5–3.

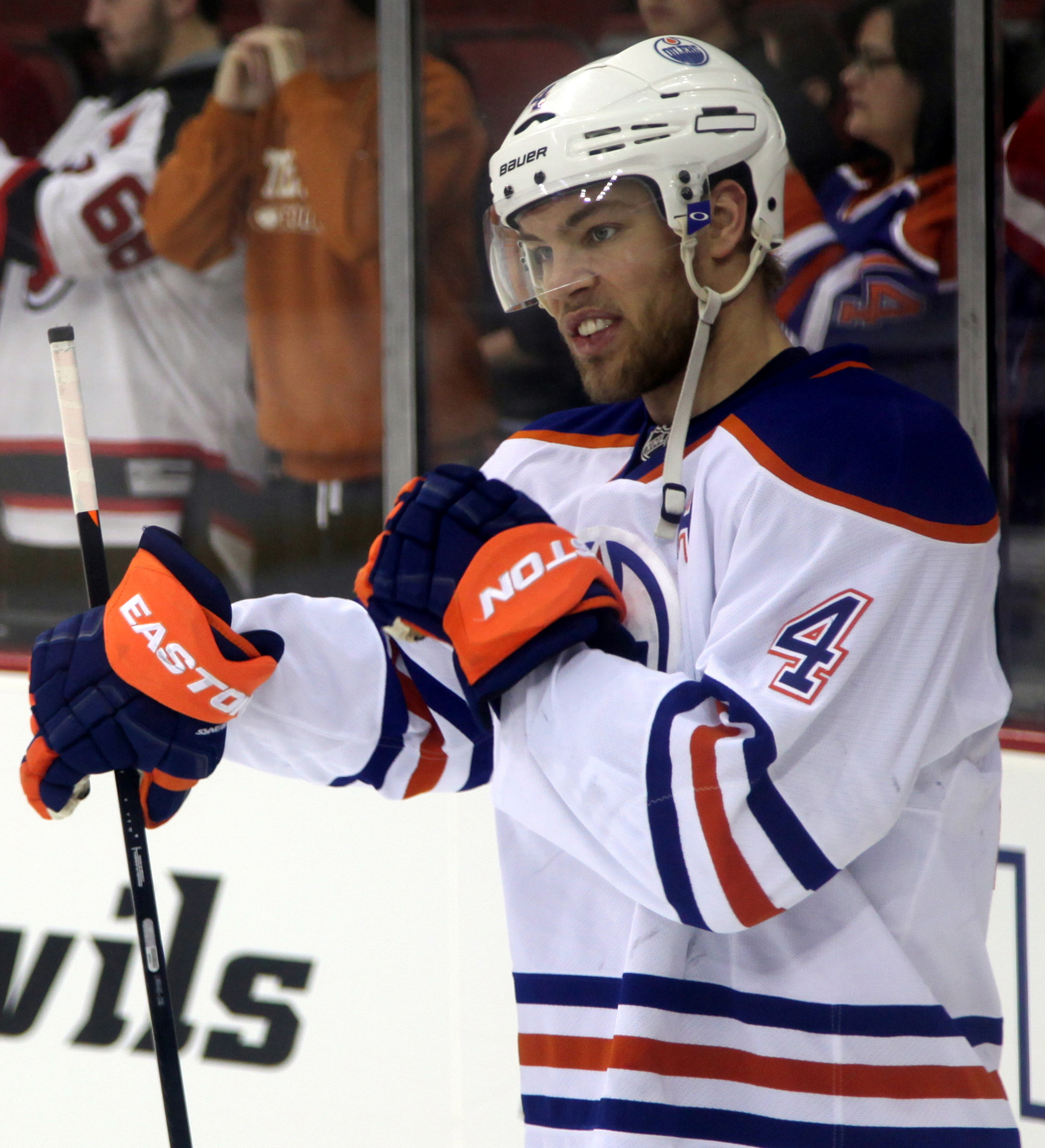
Hall playing with the Oilers in February 2014

On March 3, 2011, in a 4–2 win against the Columbus Blue Jackets, Hall recorded his first career Gordie Howe hat trick: Hall scored a goal against Steve Mason, assisted a goal scored by Jordan Eberle and fought Derek Dorsett. However, the fight with Dorsett ended Hall's rookie season early as he suffered a high ankle sprain at the end of the fight. Hall finished his rookie season scoring 22 goals and 20 assists in 65 games.

On January 17, 2012, Hall was cut by teammate Corey Potter's skate before a game against the Columbus Blue Jackets during warmup, resulting in a deep cut to his face that required 30 stitches to close.

It was announced that Hall would need major shoulder surgery and would need five to six months to recover, ending his successful sophomore year. Despite missing 21 games, Hall was still tied for fifth for power play goals.

On August 21, 2012, Hall signed a new seven-year, $42 million contract with the Oilers worth an annual average value of $6 million.

During a portion of the 2012–13 NHL lockout, Hall played for the Oklahoma City Barons, alongside his Edmonton Oilers teammates Jordan Eberle, Ryan Nugent-Hopkins and Justin Schultz. Hall had initially held off playing in the AHL during the lockout, under the belief that that he would require waivers to play due to being on the NHL injury reserve before the lockout (due to a shoulder injury). However, the AHL clarified that he would not. On November 26, Hall was named the "AHL Player of the Week".

On January 26, 2013, after the lockout had ended, Hall recorded his 100th NHL career point with two assists in a 4–3 loss against the Calgary Flames. On February 22, 2013, he was given a two-game suspension by the NHL after a collision with Minnesota Wild forward Cal Clutterbuck. On March 30, 2013, in a game against the Vancouver Canucks, Hall set a new franchise record by scoring a hat trick just 7:53 into the game. Hall finished the lockout-shortened 2012–13 season ninth in NHL regular season scoring, also recording a career-high of 34 assists, sufficient for eighth in the NHL.

On October 17, 2013, Hall broke Wayne Gretzky's previous Oilers franchise record of two goals in nine seconds by scoring two in eight. On December 5, 2013, in a 9–2 win over the Chicago Blackhawks, Hall recorded his second career NHL hat trick, having previously gone nine games without a goal.

In 2016, Hall was named to his first NHL All-Star Game as a member of the Pacific Division team.

=== New Jersey Devils (2016–2019) ===
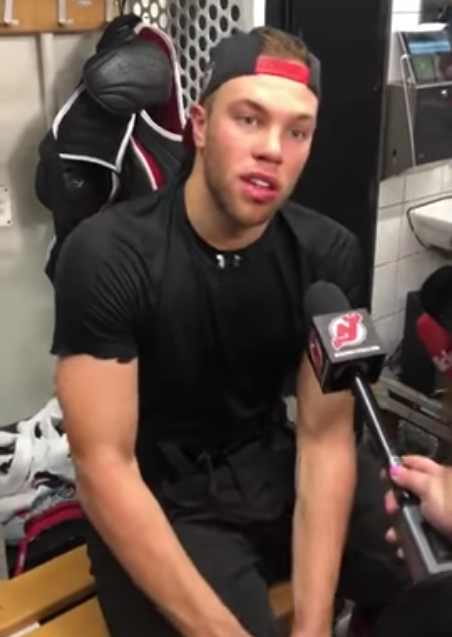
Hall in October 2018, following an exhibition match between the New Jersey Devils and the SC Bern

On June 29, 2016, Hall was traded to the New Jersey Devils in exchange for Adam Larsson. Hall chose to wear number 9 with the Devils as his usual number 4 had been retired by the team in honour of Scott Stevens. Hall scored his first goal as a Devil on October 18, 2016, against the Anaheim Ducks. He later scored another goal in the same period to secure a 2–1 win. On November 16, Hall underwent surgery for a torn meniscus in his left knee. He was expected to miss three to four weeks, but skated on his own a week after surgery and with the team at practice on November 28. Hall was named to the Metropolitan Division team as the lone representative of the Devils at the 2017 NHL All-Star Game.

Hall was again named to the NHL All-Star Game in the 2017–18 season. However, due to a hand injury, he was replaced by teammate Brian Boyle. On February 15, 2018, in a win over the Carolina Hurricanes, Hall set a Devils franchise record with a 16-game point streak. His point streak came to an end at 26 games on March 8 in a 3–2 loss to the Winnipeg Jets; Hall recorded two shots on goal in the game. His 26-game point streak was the longest in the NHL since Patrick Kane's 26-point streak in the 2015–16 season. Hall finished the regular season as the Devils' top scorer with a career-high 93 points (39 goals and 54 assists) as he led the Devils to their first Stanley Cup playoff appearance since 2012. It was also the first time Hall ever played in the playoffs. Hall again led the Devils in the playoffs as their top scorer with six points (two goals and four assists) as the team was eliminated in the first round by the Tampa Bay Lightning, four games to one. On April 26, Hall was nominated for the Ted Lindsay Award as the NHL's most outstanding player. The following day, on April 27, Hall was also declared a finalist for the Hart Memorial Trophy as the NHL's most valuable player. Hall won the latter, becoming the first player in Devils history to win the trophy.

Hall was named an alternate captain for the Devils prior to the 2018–19 season. On December 13, 2018, he suffered an injury during practice which forced him to miss two games. After returning to the lineup, Hall recorded his 200th NHL goal in a 2–1 loss to the Columbus Blue Jackets on December 20. However, he re-aggravated the injury on December 23 and was placed on injured reserve by the Devils on January 1, 2019. At the time, he had recorded 37 points in 33 games. Despite these injuries, Hall was selected for his fourth consecutive All-Star Game, but was later replaced by teammate Kyle Palmieri as he had not yet recovered. In February, Hall underwent arthroscopic knee surgery and entered rehabilitation.

After not playing for the rest of the 2018–19 season, Hall suited up the Devils pre-season games. In his first game back since December, Hall recorded a goal and an assist in a 4–2 win over the New York Rangers during the pre-season.

=== Arizona Coyotes (2019–2020) ===
In the final year of his contract and with the Devils standing outside the playoff picture, speculation arose that Hall was likely to be traded. On December 13, 2019, it was announced that Hall would be scratched for that day's game against the Colorado Avalanche for "precautionary reasons". Hall would again be scratched the following night against the Coyotes.

On December 16, 2019, the Devils traded Hall and Blake Speers to the Arizona Coyotes in exchange for Nick Merkley, Kevin Bahl, Nate Schnarr, a conditional first-round pick in 2020 and a conditional third-round pick in 2021.

On October 7, 2020, Coyotes general manager Bill Armstrong announced that the Coyotes would not be re-signing Taylor Hall, marking the first time in Hall's career that he would be an unrestricted free agent.

=== Buffalo Sabres (2020–2021) ===
On October 11, 2020, Hall agreed to join the Buffalo Sabres, signing a one-year, $8-million contract. In the pandemic delayed 2020–21 season, Hall struggled to show his offensive acumen, collecting just 2 goals and 19 points through 37 regular season games for the Sabres.

=== Boston Bruins (2021–2023) ===
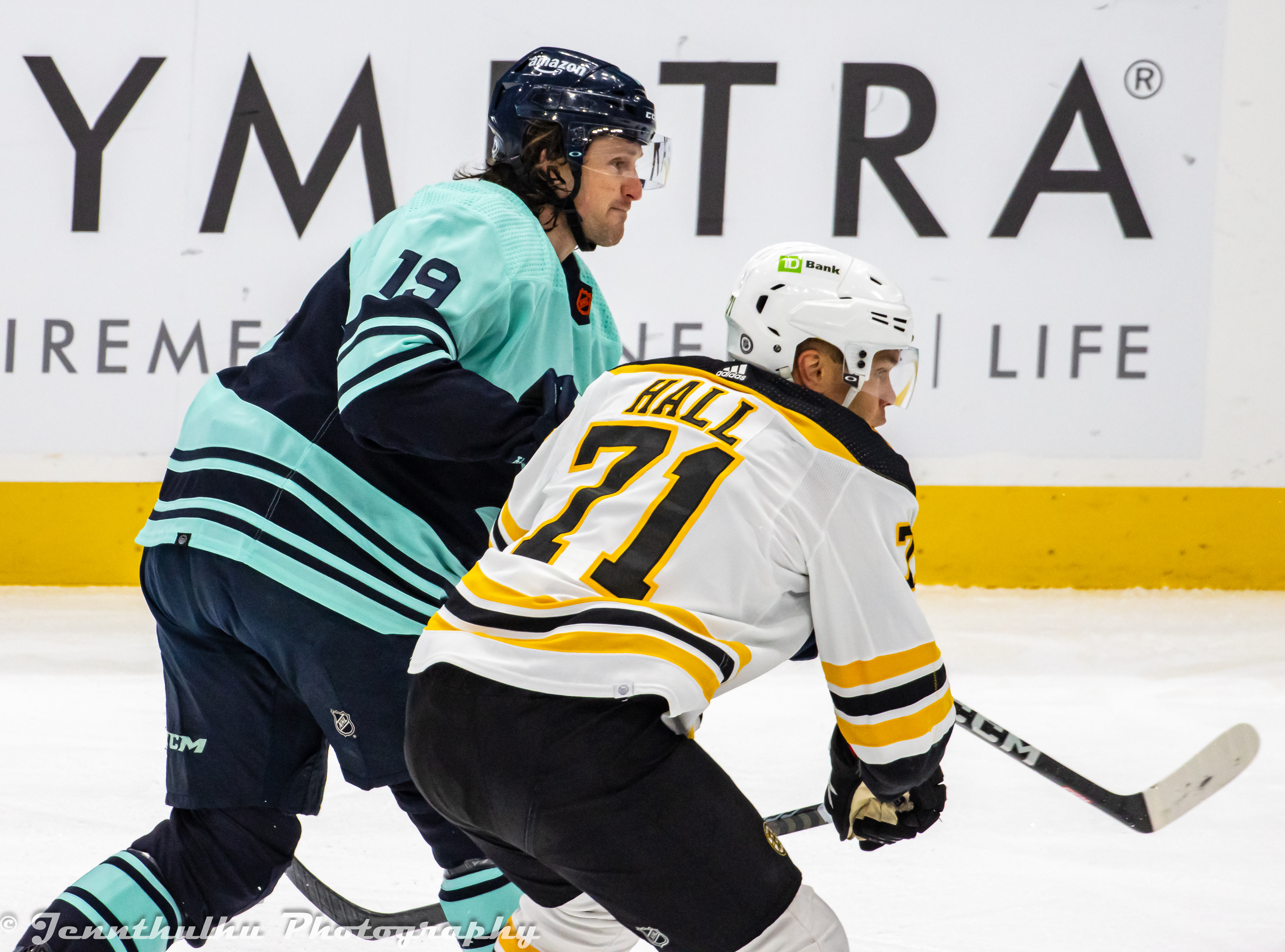
Hall (right) and Jared McCann during a February 2023 game between the Boston Bruins and Seattle Kraken

With the Sabres out of playoff contention and on the eve of the trade deadline, Hall, with his salary retained by 50%, was traded by the Sabres along with Curtis Lazar to the Boston Bruins in exchange for Anders Bjork and a 2021 second-round pick on April 11, 2021. Hall scored his first goal with the Bruins on April 15, 2021. Hall chose to wear number 71 with the Bruins as his usual number 4 had been retired by the team in honour of Bobby Orr. Hall's presence as the new left-wing forward on David Krejčí's line provided an immediate boost to the Bruins' offense as the season wound down, with a total of 8 goals and 6 assists over the concluding 16 games of the 2020–21 season that he played in for the Bruins. On May 17, 2021, Hall recorded the tying goal against the Capitals to send the Bruins to overtime in Game 2 of the first round of the Stanley Cup Playoffs.

On July 23, 2021, Hall opted to forgo free agency by agreeing to a four-year, $24 million contract extension with the Bruins.

Hall had a successful first full year with the Bruins, scoring 20 goals and 41 assists, totalling 61 points, his highest since his MVP season with New Jersey. He also played in 81 total games, once again the most since his MVP season and his most since his final season in Edmonton. Once again, Hall provided a boost for his linemates, this time Erik Haula and David Pastrňák. The Bruins made the playoffs in the first wild card spot, playing the Carolina Hurricanes, whom they fell to in seven games. In the series, Hall scored two goals and two assists, totalling four points.

In the 2022–23 season, Hall was relegated to a third-line role with the Bruins, which he accepted without complaint. Hall suffered a lower body injury against the Vancouver Canucks on February 25, 2023 and was placed on LTIR just a few days later. Hall was later reactivated and returned to action for the Bruins after 20 games. Hall scored 16 goals and 20 assists for 36 points in 61 total games, as the Bruins had a historic season, breaking the NHL record for most wins and points in a regular season. However, the season would end in disappointment when Hall and the Bruins fell to the Florida Panthers in seven games in the first round of the Stanley Cup Playoffs. Despite the disappointment, Hall was seen as one of the Bruins top playoff performers, scoring 5 goals and 3 assists for 8 points in the seven game series, which was second on the Bruins.

=== Chicago Blackhawks (2023–2025) ===
On June 26, 2023, due to salary cap implications, Hall was traded by the Bruins along with Nick Foligno to the Chicago Blackhawks, in exchange for Ian Mitchell and Alec Regula. On November 9, Hall injured his right knee after a collision with Mikey Eyssimont of the Tampa Bay Lightning. He returned on November 18, playing in back-to-back games against the Nashville Predators and Buffalo Sabres, but then missed the November 22 game against the Columbus Blue Jackets. On November 23, it was announced that Hall would miss the remainder of the season due to knee injury, which would require a surgery.

Hall entered the 2024–25 season as a leader on a young Blackhawks team and looked to be a mentor to generational talent, Connor Bedard, playing with him on the top line. Hall was surprisingly a healthy scratch on November 17, 2024. He didn't let it falter his game, however, as a few games later, on November 27, in a 6–2 win over the Dallas Stars, Hall recorded his fifth career NHL hat trick.

=== Carolina Hurricanes (2025–present) ===
On January 24, 2025, Hall was traded to the Carolina Hurricanes in a three-team deal involving the Colorado Avalanche. On February 27, 2025, Hall scored his first goal as a Hurricane, in a 5–2 win against the Buffalo Sabres. Hall continued to build off his role as a veteran leader in Carolina and found offensive success in the process. Between March 7 and April 3, Hall had at least one point in ten of 12 games, including scoring his sixth career hat trick and second of the season in a 5–2 win over the Anaheim Ducks on March 23. In the stretch, Hall totalled seven goals and six assists. Hall would help the Hurricanes to qualify for the 2025 Stanley Cup Playoffs. During the playoffs, Hall scored two assists in Game 1 of the opening round against his former team, the New Jersey Devils. On April 30, in the midst of their first-round series, Hall signed a three-year, $9.5 million contract extension with the Hurricanes.

The Hurricanes' run in the 2026 Stanley Cup playoffs (at the end of his 16th NHL season) marked only the third occasion in his career that Hall advanced to the second round of a Stanley Cup playoffs, and the first occasion he advanced to either the third round or the Stanley Cup Final. Playing in the 2026 Stanley Cup Final, Hall won his first career Stanley Cup title on June 14, 2026, scoring the cup-clinching goal in game 6.

On November 12, 2026, Hall played his 1,000th NHL game, a 4–1 win over the Seattle Kraken. The game was played in Helsinki, Finland, as part of the 2026 NHL Global Series, making Hall the first player in NHL history to play his 1,000th game outside of North America.

== International play ==
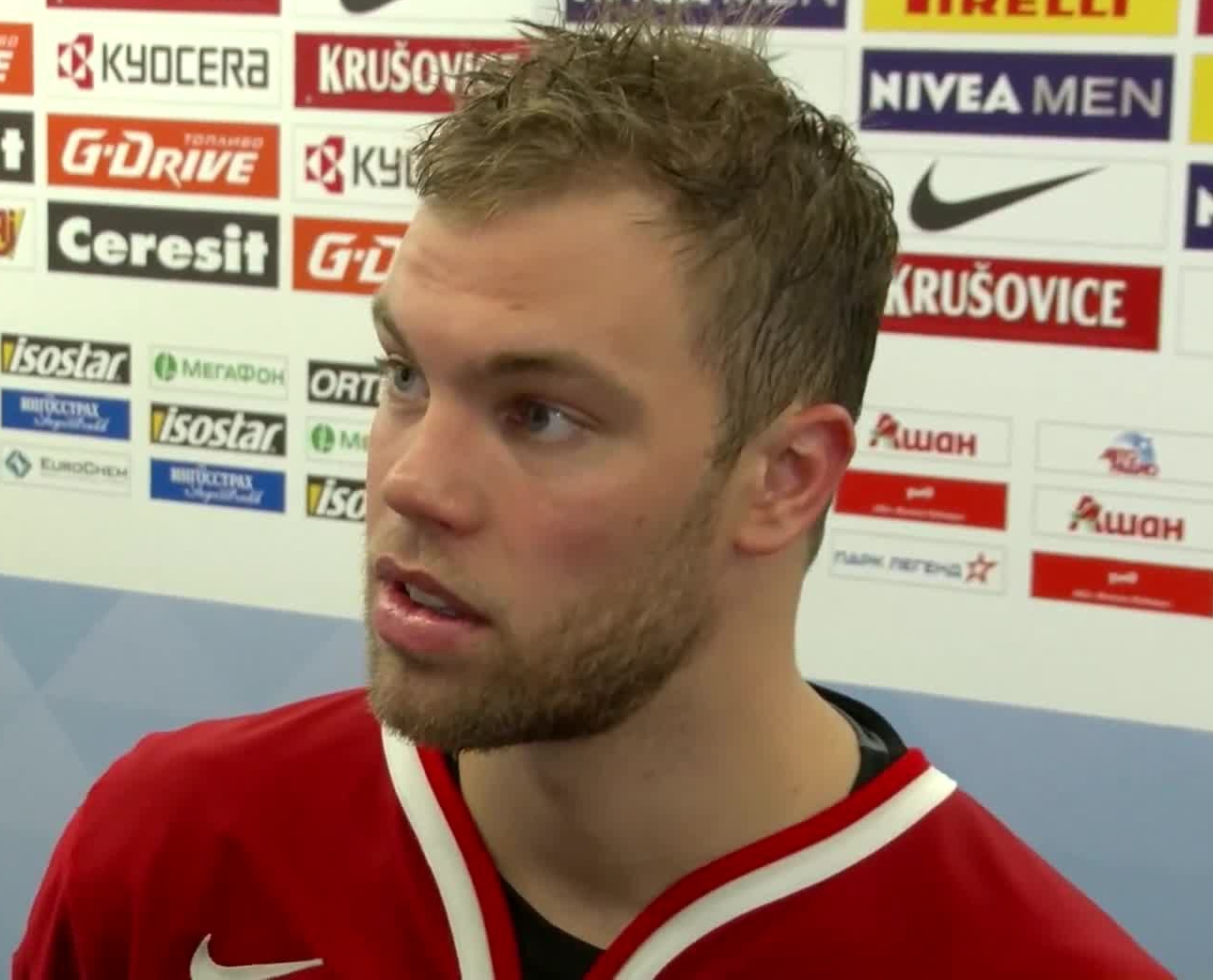
- Hall with Canada senior team at the 2016 World Championship

Medal record

Men's ice hockey

Representing Canada

World Championships
Gold medal – first place	2015 Czech Republic	
Gold medal – first place	2016 Russia	

IIHF World U20 Championship
Silver medal – second place	2010 Canada	

Ivan Hlinka Memorial Tournament
Gold medal – first place	2008 Slovakia	

IIHF World U18 Championships
Gold medal – first place	2008 Russia	

Representing Ontario

World U-17 Hockey Challenge
Gold medal – first place	2008 Canada	

Hall represented Canada under-18 team at the 2008 World U18 Championships as one of five 16-year-olds. He was fifth in tournament scoring, with nine points in seven games, helping Canada to a gold medal. He returned to the under-18 team to earn a second gold medal at the 2008 Ivan Hlinka Memorial Tournament as an alternate captain to captain Matt Duchene.

Hall played for Canada junior team in the 2010 World Junior Championships. He was the lone 2010 NHL entry draft-eligible player selected to the final roster. Hall scored a hat trick against Slovakia junior team in a Canada's 8–2 win. He finished the tournament tied for third overall in scoring with teammate Alex Pietrangelo and Jerry D'Amigo of the United States junior team; Hall finished with six goals and six assists in six games.

Hall was invited to summer evaluation camp for the 2011 World Junior Championships, but declined to participate, choosing instead to focus on making the Edmonton Oilers' roster for the upcoming NHL season. According to Hockey Canada's policy, Hall would have been ineligible to participate in the tournament even if he was available.

At the 2015 World Championship, where Canada senior team won the gold medal for the first time since 2007 with a perfect 10–0 record, Hall was named a member of the tournament all-star team. He played at the 2016 World Championship, where Canada successfully defended their gold medal.

== Personal life ==
During his early NHL career, Hall was roommates with his Edmonton Oilers teammate Jordan Eberle.

Hall married his wife, Rachel Rush, at Graydon Hall Manor in July 2022. They have two sons, Stetson and Chance.

== Career statistics ==
=== Regular season and playoffs ===
			Regular season					Playoffs
Season	Team	League	GP	G	A	Pts	PIM	GP	G	A	Pts	PIM
2006–07	Kingston Predators AAA	ETA U16	32	47	45	92	14	—	—	—	—	—
2007–08	Windsor Spitfires	OHL	63	45	39	84	22	5	2	3	5	2
2008–09	Windsor Spitfires	OHL	63	38	52	90	60	20	16	20	36	12
2009–10	Windsor Spitfires	OHL	57	40	66	106	56	19	17	18	35	32
2010–11	Edmonton Oilers	NHL	65	22	20	42	27	—	—	—	—	—
2011–12	Edmonton Oilers	NHL	61	27	26	53	36	—	—	—	—	—
2012–13	Oklahoma City Barons	AHL	28	14	20	34	33	—	—	—	—	—
2012–13	Edmonton Oilers	NHL	45	16	34	50	33	—	—	—	—	—
2013–14	Edmonton Oilers	NHL	75	27	53	80	44	—	—	—	—	—
2014–15	Edmonton Oilers	NHL	53	14	24	38	40	—	—	—	—	—
2015–16	Edmonton Oilers	NHL	82	26	39	65	54	—	—	—	—	—
2016–17	New Jersey Devils	NHL	72	20	33	53	32	—	—	—	—	—
2017–18	New Jersey Devils	NHL	76	39	54	93	34	5	2	4	6	6
2018–19	New Jersey Devils	NHL	33	11	26	37	16	—	—	—	—	—
2019–20	New Jersey Devils	NHL	30	6	19	25	20	—	—	—	—	—
2019–20	Arizona Coyotes	NHL	35	10	17	27	14	9	2	4	6	10
2020–21	Buffalo Sabres	NHL	37	2	17	19	24	—	—	—	—	—
2020–21	Boston Bruins	NHL	16	8	6	14	2	11	3	2	5	9
2021–22	Boston Bruins	NHL	81	20	41	61	42	7	2	2	4	8
2022–23	Boston Bruins	NHL	61	16	20	36	24	7	5	3	8	2
2023–24	Chicago Blackhawks	NHL	10	2	2	4	4	—	—	—	—	—
2024–25	Chicago Blackhawks	NHL	46	9	15	24	16	—	—	—	—	—
2024–25	Carolina Hurricanes	NHL	31	9	9	18	20	15	2	4	6	2
2025–26	Carolina Hurricanes	NHL	80	18	30	48	44	19	7	12	19	14
NHL totals			989	302	485	787	526	73	23	31	54	51

=== International ===
Year	Team	Event	Result	GP	G	A	Pts	PIM
2008	Canada Ontario	U17	1st place, gold medalist(s)	5	4	4	8	4
2008	Canada	U18	1st place, gold medalist(s)	4	2	6	8	2
2008	Canada	IH18	1st place, gold medalist(s)	4	3	0	3	0
2010	Canada	WJC	2nd place, silver medalist(s)	6	6	6	12	0
2013	Canada	WC	5th	8	2	1	3	0
2015	Canada	WC	1st place, gold medalist(s)	10	7	5	12	6
2016	Canada	WC	1st place, gold medalist(s)	10	6	3	9	2
Junior totals				23	16	21	37	10
Senior totals				28	15	9	24	8

== Awards and honours ==
Award	Year	Ref
CHL / OHL
Emms Family Award	2008	
OHL All-Rookie Team	2008	
CHL Rookie of the Year Award	2008	
Wayne Gretzky 99 Award	2009	
OHL first-team All-Star	2009, 2010	
Stafford Smythe Memorial Trophy	2009, 2010	
Memorial Cup All-Star team	2009, 2010	
CHL/NHL Top Prospects Game	2010	
Eddie Powers Memorial Trophy	2010	
Ed Chynoweth Trophy	2010	
CHL second-team All-Star	2010	
NHL
NHL All-Star Game	2011, 2016, 2017, 2018, 2019	
Hart Memorial Trophy	2018	
NHL First All-Star team	2018	
Stanley Cup champion	2026	

== Records ==
=== NHL ===
- Most seasons played by a first overall pick before winning a Stanley Cup (16 seasons)
- First player to play their 1,000th career game outside of North America

==== Edmonton Oilers ====
- First first overall pick in franchise history
- Fastest two goals at any time during a game (8 seconds)
- Fastest hat-trick from the start of a game (7:53)

==== New Jersey Devils ====
- Longest point steak in a season (19 games, in 2017–18)
- First Hart Memorial Trophy winner in franchise history

==== Carolina Hurricanes ====
- Most road points in a postseason (11, in 2026)

Awards and achievements
Preceded by Patrick Kane	Winner of the Emms Family Award; 2007–08	Succeeded by Evgeny Grachev
Preceded by Patrick Kane	CHL Rookie of the Year; 2007–08	Succeeded by Brett Connolly
Preceded by Connor McDavid	Hart Memorial Trophy winner 2018	Succeeded by Nikita Kucherov
Preceded by John Tavares	NHL first overall draft pick 2010	Succeeded by Ryan Nugent-Hopkins
Preceded by Magnus Pääjärvi	Edmonton Oilers first-round draft pick 2010	Succeeded by Ryan Nugent-Hopkins
