= Patrice Cormier =

Canadian ice hockey player (born 1990)

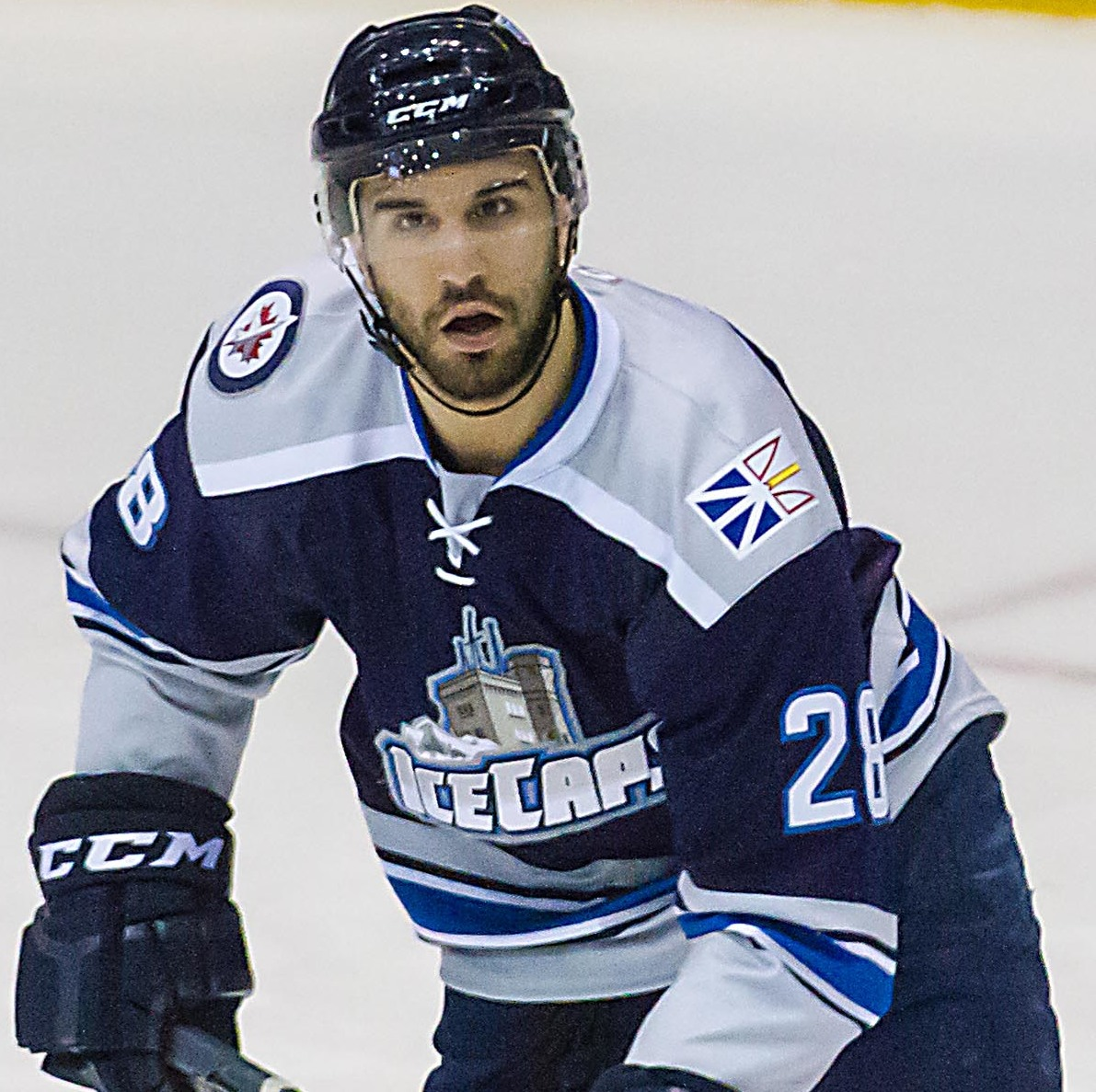
- Cormier with the St. John's IceCaps in 2015
- Born: June 14, 1990 (age 35) Cap-Pelé, New Brunswick, Canada
- Height: 6 ft 2 in (188 cm)
- Weight: 215 lb (98 kg; 15 st 5 lb)
- Position: Centre
- Shoots: Left
- DEL team Former teams: Eisbären Berlin; Atlanta Thrashers; Winnipeg Jets; Barys Astana; Ak Bars Kazan; Avtomobilist Yekaterinburg
- NHL draft: 54th overall, 2008; New Jersey Devils
- Playing career: 2010–present

Patrice Victor Cormier (born June 14, 1990) is a Canadian professional ice hockey forward. He is currently under contract with the Bouctouche JC’s of the Ligue de Hockey Senior Beausejour. Cormier was drafted in the second round, 54th overall, by the New Jersey Devils at the 2008 NHL entry draft.

== Playing career ==
=== Junior ===
==== Rimouski Océanic ====
Cormier started his Quebec Major Junior Hockey League (QMJHL) career with the Rimouski Océanic. During his rookie season he scored 11 goals and added 10 assists 53 games. He also represented New Brunswick in the ice hockey tournament at the 2007 Canada Games, where Cormier scored seven goals and thirteen assists in six games played as his team finished in seventh place. Cormier followed that up in the 2007–08 season, in which he posted 18 goals and 23 assists with 84 PIMs in 51 games. However, during the 2007–08 season, Cormier was riddled with injuries, including a burst appendix, concussion, and a pair of shoulder problems, all of which hampered his play and his draft position. The New Jersey Devils drafted him with the 54th overall pick.

Cormier experienced a breakout performance during the 2008–09 QMJHL season, in which he posted career highs of 23 goals, 28 assists, 51 points, and 118 PIMs. His great performance continued with the QMJHL playoffs in which he led Rimouski to the playoff semifinals with four goals and six assists in 13 games, along with 30 PIMs, and the squad qualified for the 2009 Memorial Cup. While competing with the Océanic, Patrice followed the QMJHL playoffs with strong Memorial Cup play and was named to the tournament All-Star team.

==== Rouyn-Noranda Huskies ====
Cormier was traded from Rimouski to the Rouyn-Noranda Huskies. Shortly after he was traded, Cormier was involved in an incident where he severely injured an opponent, Mikael Tam of the Quebec Remparts, with an elbow that sent the latter player to hospital. The Remparts filed a police complaint over the hit. Cormier faced criminal charges over the hit against Tam.

On January 18, 2010, Cormier was suspended indefinitely by the QMJHL pending a full review of the incident. On January 25, 2010, Cormier was suspended by the QMJHL for the rest of the 2010 season. He finished his Rouyn-Noranda Huskies career with five assists in three games, before the season-ending (and QMJHL career-ending) suspension.

=== Professional ===
On February 4, 2010, Cormier was traded to the Atlanta Thrashers along with Johnny Oduya, Niclas Bergfors and a first round draft pick in the 2010 NHL entry draft for Ilya Kovalchuk. After Rouyn-Noranda was eliminated from the QMJHL playoffs, Cormier was named to the playoff roster for the Chicago Wolves of the American Hockey League (AHL). His first NHL goal was scored on January 7, 2011 against James Reimer of the Toronto Maple Leafs. Once the Thrashers relocated to Winnipeg, Cormier was assigned to the St. John's Ice Caps of the AHL. The Winnipeg Jets recalled Cormier several times from the Ice Caps, the last time being on November 4, 2015.

Cormier began the 2015–16 season with the Manitoba Moose and was named an alternate captain.

Out of contract with the Winnipeg Jets in the off-season, Cormier opted to remain with their affiliate, the Manitoba Moose, signing a one-year AHL deal on August 30, 2016, and was later named team captain on October 14, 2016, shortly before the 2016–17 season began. On July 5, 2017, he continued his tenure with the Moose and agreed to a one-year extension on July 5, 2017.

After three seasons with the Moose, Cormier opted to leave North America and agreed to a one-year contract with Kazakhstani club, Barys Astana of the KHL on July 2, 2018. Cormier was instantly a success with Barys, scoring 18 goals and 40 points in 56 games in the 2018–19 season. He registered a further 4 points in 11 post-season games, helping Barys advance to the second round.

As a free agent from Barys, Cormier continued in the KHL, securing a lucrative one-year contract with Russian club, Ak Bars Kazan, on May 4, 2019.

Following two seasons with Ak Bars, Cormier left the club as a free agent and continued his tenure in the KHL by agreeing to a two-year contract with Avtomobilist Yekaterinburg on May 3, 2021.

After five seasons in the KHL, Cormier left Russia as a free agent and was signed to a one-year contract with German club, Eisbären Berlin of the DEL, on May 15, 2023.

== International play ==
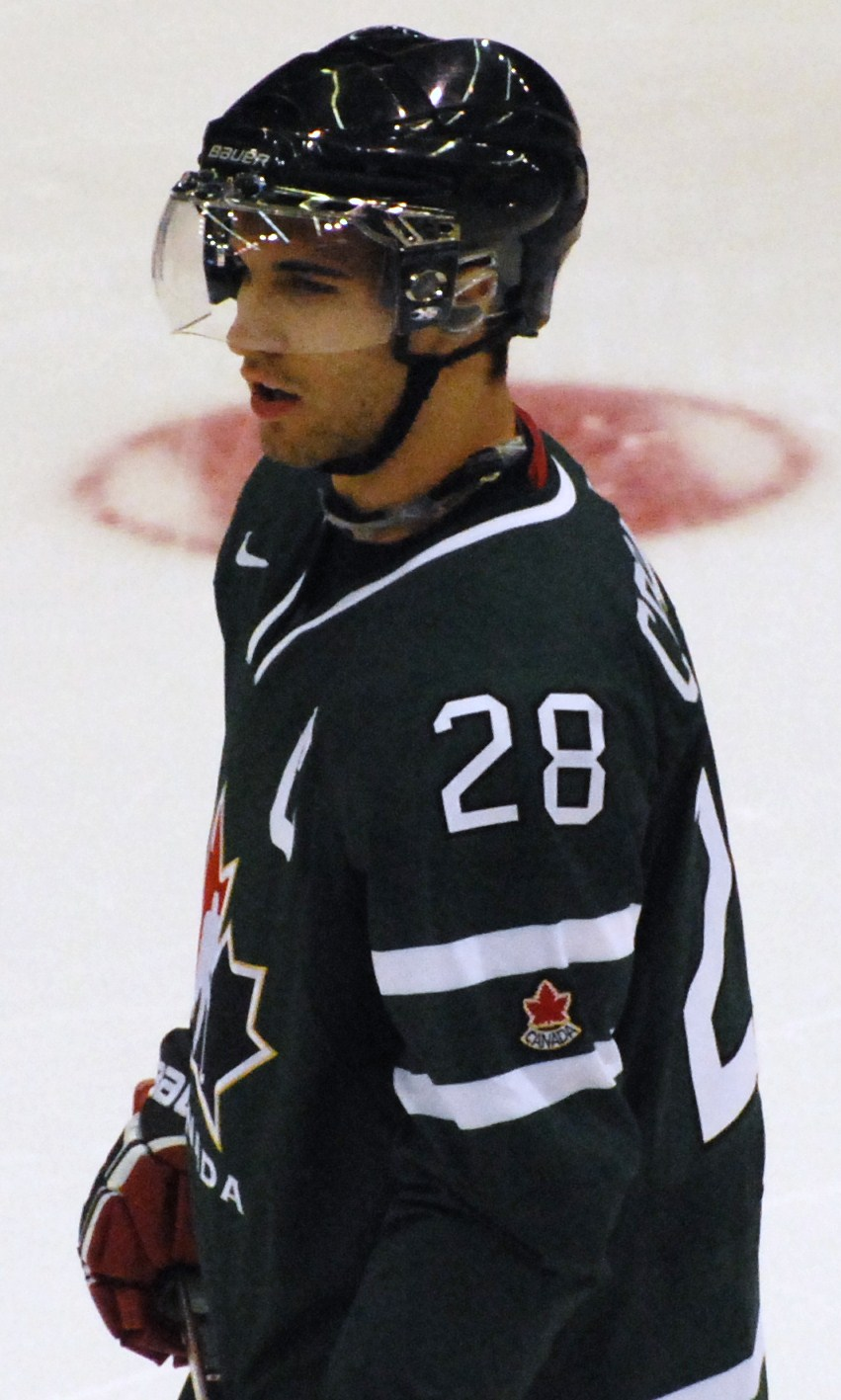
- Cormier in 2009.

Medal record

Ice hockey

Representing Canada

World Junior Championships
Silver medal – second place	2010 Saskatoon	
Gold medal – first place	2009 Ottawa	

Cormier represented Canada in the IIHF World Junior Ice Hockey Championship in 2009 on their way to a gold medal and scored a goal and had two assists in six games. At the 2010 event, he served as the captain of Canada, and added two goals and three assists in six games as Canada took home silver.

== Family ==
Cormier married Tanya in 2016 and had his first child in August 2018. His older brother Kevin was selected by the Phoenix Coyotes in the sixth round of the 2004 NHL entry draft.

== Career statistics ==
=== Regular season and playoffs ===
			Regular season					Playoffs
Season	Team	League	GP	G	A	Pts	PIM	GP	G	A	Pts	PIM
2004–05	Moncton Gagnon Beavers	MJAHL	31	4	8	12	35	—	—	—	—	—
2005–06	Moncton Gagnon Beavers	MJAHL	43	21	27	48	41	—	—	—	—	—
2006–07	Rimouski Océanic	QMJHL	53	11	10	21	73	—	—	—	—	—
2007–08	Rimouski Océanic	QMJHL	51	18	23	41	84	9	4	5	9	10
2008–09	Rimouski Océanic	QMJHL	54	23	28	51	118	13	4	6	10	30
2009–10	Rimouski Océanic	QMJHL	28	11	15	26	57	—	—	—	—	—
2009–10	Rouyn-Noranda Huskies	QMJHL	3	0	5	5	7	—	—	—	—	—
2009–10	Chicago Wolves	AHL	—	—	—	—	—	9	0	0	0	8
2010–11	Chicago Wolves	AHL	11	2	3	5	14	—	—	—	—	—
2010–11	Atlanta Thrashers	NHL	21	1	1	2	4	—	—	—	—	—
2011–12	St. John's IceCaps	AHL	56	18	15	33	75	15	3	0	3	12
2011–12	Winnipeg Jets	NHL	9	0	0	0	0	—	—	—	—	—
2012–13	St. John's IceCaps	AHL	35	7	4	11	69	—	—	—	—	—
2012–13	Winnipeg Jets	NHL	10	0	0	0	7	—	—	—	—	—
2013–14	St. John's IceCaps	AHL	61	9	17	26	98	21	2	5	7	22
2013–14	Winnipeg Jets	NHL	9	0	3	3	7	—	—	—	—	—
2014–15	St. John's IceCaps	AHL	47	12	9	21	74	—	—	—	—	—
2014–15	Winnipeg Jets	NHL	1	0	0	0	0	—	—	—	—	—
2015–16	Manitoba Moose	AHL	65	15	17	32	73	—	—	—	—	—
2015–16	Winnipeg Jets	NHL	2	0	0	0	0	—	—	—	—	—
2016–17	Manitoba Moose	AHL	69	13	16	29	101	—	—	—	—	—
2017–18	Manitoba Moose	AHL	69	22	21	43	126	9	1	1	2	38
2018–19	Barys Astana	KHL	56	18	22	40	101	11	1	3	4	35
2019–20	Ak Bars Kazan	KHL	56	11	13	24	44	4	0	0	0	0
2020–21	Ak Bars Kazan	KHL	46	6	14	20	109	15	2	3	5	10
2021–22	Avtomobilist Yekaterinburg	KHL	42	8	6	14	63	—	—	—	—	—
2022–23	Avtomobilist Yekaterinburg	KHL	55	7	12	19	54	7	0	2	2	12
2023–24	Eisbären Berlin	DEL	37	12	9	21	72	12	0	1	1	14
NHL totals			52	1	4	5	18	—	—	—	—	—
KHL totals			255	50	67	117	371	37	3	8	11	57

=== International ===
Year	Team	Event	Result	GP	G	A	Pts	PIM
2009	Canada	WJC	1st place, gold medalist(s)	6	1	2	3	6
2010	Canada	WJC	2nd place, silver medalist(s)	6	2	3	5	4
Junior totals				12	3	5	8	10

== Awards and honours ==
Award	Year
CHL
CHL/NHL Top Prospects Game	2007–08
Memorial Cup All-Star Team	2009
DEL
Champions (Eisbären Berlin)	2024
