= 2015 IIHF World Championship rosters =

Roster of hockey championship

Each team's roster consisted of at least 15 skaters (forwards and defencemen) and two goaltenders, and at most 22 skaters and three goaltenders. All 16 participating nations, through the confirmation of their respective national associations, had to submit a roster by the first IIHF directorate meeting.

Age and team as of 1 May 2015.

== Group A ==
=== Austria ===
A 53-player roster was announced on 6 March 2015 which was trimmed to 26 on 4 April 2015. A 28-player list was released on 21 April 2015.

Head coach: Dan Ratushny

No.	Pos.	Name	Height	Weight	Birthdate	Team
4	D	Daniel Mitterdorfer	1.83 m (6 ft 0 in)	82 kg (181 lb)	July 25, 1989 (aged 25)	(Austria) Black Wings Linz
5	F	Thomas Raffl – C	1.94 m (6 ft 4 in)	97 kg (214 lb)	June 19, 1986 (aged 28)	(Austria) Red Bull Salzburg
6	F	Rafael Rotter	1.75 m (5 ft 9 in)	79 kg (174 lb)	June 14, 1987 (aged 27)	(Austria) Vienna Capitals
7	F	Brian Lebler – A	1.91 m (6 ft 3 in)	103 kg (227 lb)	July 16, 1988 (aged 26)	(Austria) Black Wings Linz
12	F	Michael Raffl	1.85 m (6 ft 1 in)	87 kg (192 lb)	December 1, 1988 (aged 26)	(United States) Philadelphia Flyers
14	D	Patrick Peter	1.83 m (6 ft 0 in)	90 kg (200 lb)	January 27, 1994 (aged 21)	(Austria) Vienna Capitals
15	F	Manuel Latusa – A	1.82 m (6 ft 0 in)	88 kg (194 lb)	January 23, 1984 (aged 31)	(Austria) Red Bull Salzburg
17	F	Manuel Ganahl	1.82 m (6 ft 0 in)	84 kg (185 lb)	July 12, 1990 (aged 24)	(Austria) Graz 99ers
21	F	Manuel Geier	1.79 m (5 ft 10 in)	83 kg (183 lb)	January 8, 1988 (aged 27)	(Austria) KAC
22	F	Nikolas Petrik	1.78 m (5 ft 10 in)	88 kg (194 lb)	March 19, 1984 (aged 31)	(Austria) Dornbirner
27	F	Thomas Hundertpfund	1.90 m (6 ft 3 in)	95 kg (209 lb)	December 14, 1989 (aged 25)	(Austria) KAC
28	D	Martin Schumnig	1.82 m (6 ft 0 in)	86 kg (190 lb)	July 28, 1989 (aged 25)	(Austria) KAC
29	G	Bernhard Starkbaum	1.86 m (6 ft 1 in)	89 kg (196 lb)	February 19, 1986 (aged 29)	(Sweden) Brynäs
30	G	Rene Swette	1.83 m (6 ft 0 in)	82 kg (181 lb)	August 21, 1988 (aged 26)	(Austria) KAC
31	G	David Madlener	1.89 m (6 ft 2 in)	83 kg (183 lb)	March 31, 1992 (aged 23)	(Austria) Dornbirner
41	D	Mario Altmann	1.93 m (6 ft 4 in)	97 kg (214 lb)	November 4, 1986 (aged 28)	(Austria) EC VSV
48	D	Florian Iberer	1.85 m (6 ft 1 in)	95 kg (209 lb)	December 7, 1982 (aged 32)	(Austria) Vienna Capitals
50	F	Mario Fischer	1.87 m (6 ft 2 in)	90 kg (200 lb)	May 5, 1989 (aged 25)	(Austria) Vienna Capitals
67	F	Konstantin Komarek	1.82 m (6 ft 0 in)	85 kg (187 lb)	November 8, 1992 (aged 22)	(Austria) Red Bull Salzburg
71	F	Daniel Woger	1.82 m (6 ft 0 in)	87 kg (192 lb)	February 25, 1988 (aged 27)	(Austria) Graz 99ers
77	D	Florian Muhlstein	1.85 m (6 ft 1 in)	82 kg (181 lb)	November 12, 1990 (aged 24)	(Austria) Red Bull Salzburg
89	F	Raphael Herburger	1.78 m (5 ft 10 in)	72 kg (159 lb)	January 2, 1989 (aged 26)	(Switzerland) Biel
90	D	Alexander Pallestrang	1.84 m (6 ft 0 in)	86 kg (190 lb)	April 4, 1990 (aged 25)	(Austria) Red Bull Salzburg
91	D	Dominique Heinrich	1.75 m (5 ft 9 in)	76 kg (168 lb)	July 31, 1990 (aged 24)	(Austria) Red Bull Salzburg
94	F	Alexander Cijan	1.80 m (5 ft 11 in)	84 kg (185 lb)	May 16, 1994 (aged 20)	(Austria) Red Bull Salzburg

=== Canada ===
The first 19 players were announced on 14 April 2015 by Hockey Canada. On 26 April a 21-player list was named.

Head coach: Todd McLellan

No.	Pos.	Name	Height	Weight	Birthdate	Team
2	D	Dan Hamhuis – A	1.85 m (6 ft 1 in)	95 kg (209 lb)	December 13, 1982 (aged 32)	(Canada) Vancouver Canucks
4	F	Taylor Hall	1.85 m (6 ft 1 in)	90 kg (200 lb)	November 14, 1991 (aged 23)	(Canada) Edmonton Oilers
5	D	Aaron Ekblad	1.93 m (6 ft 4 in)	98 kg (216 lb)	February 7, 1996 (aged 19)	(United States) Florida Panthers
6	D	Jake Muzzin	1.91 m (6 ft 3 in)	97 kg (214 lb)	February 21, 1989 (aged 26)	(United States) Los Angeles Kings
7	F	Sean Couturier	1.86 m (6 ft 1 in)	89 kg (196 lb)	December 7, 1992 (aged 22)	(United States) Philadelphia Flyers
9	F	Matt Duchene	1.85 m (6 ft 1 in)	90 kg (200 lb)	January 16, 1991 (aged 24)	(United States) Colorado Avalanche
10	F	Brayden Schenn	1.85 m (6 ft 1 in)	85 kg (187 lb)	August 22, 1991 (aged 23)	(United States) Philadelphia Flyers
14	F	Jordan Eberle	1.82 m (6 ft 0 in)	85 kg (187 lb)	May 15, 1990 (aged 24)	(Canada) Edmonton Oilers
20	F	Cody Eakin	1.83 m (6 ft 0 in)	87 kg (192 lb)	May 24, 1991 (aged 23)	(United States) Dallas Stars
22	D	Tyson Barrie	1.78 m (5 ft 10 in)	86 kg (190 lb)	July 26, 1991 (aged 23)	(United States) Colorado Avalanche
28	F	Claude Giroux	1.80 m (5 ft 11 in)	83 kg (183 lb)	January 12, 1988 (aged 27)	(United States) Philadelphia Flyers
29	F	Nathan MacKinnon	1.82 m (6 ft 0 in)	85 kg (187 lb)	September 1, 1995 (aged 19)	(United States) Colorado Avalanche
31	G	Martin Jones	1.93 m (6 ft 4 in)	85 kg (187 lb)	January 10, 1990 (aged 25)	(United States) Los Angeles Kings
41	G	Mike Smith	1.93 m (6 ft 4 in)	98 kg (216 lb)	March 22, 1982 (aged 33)	(United States) Arizona Coyotes
46	D	Patrick Wiercioch	1.98 m (6 ft 6 in)	86 kg (190 lb)	September 12, 1990 (aged 24)	(Canada) Ottawa Senators
58	D	David Savard	1.88 m (6 ft 2 in)	100 kg (220 lb)	October 22, 1990 (aged 24)	(United States) Columbus Blue Jackets
63	F	Tyler Ennis	1.75 m (5 ft 9 in)	77 kg (170 lb)	October 6, 1989 (aged 25)	(United States) Buffalo Sabres
73	F	Tyler Toffoli	1.86 m (6 ft 1 in)	89 kg (196 lb)	April 24, 1992 (aged 23)	(United States) Los Angeles Kings
79	F	Ryan O'Reilly	1.83 m (6 ft 0 in)	96 kg (212 lb)	February 7, 1991 (aged 24)	(United States) Colorado Avalanche
87	F	Sidney Crosby – C	1.80 m (5 ft 11 in)	90 kg (200 lb)	August 7, 1987 (aged 27)	(United States) Pittsburgh Penguins
88	D	Brent Burns	1.95 m (6 ft 5 in)	105 kg (231 lb)	March 9, 1985 (aged 30)	(United States) San Jose Sharks
90	F	Jason Spezza – A	1.91 m (6 ft 3 in)	100 kg (220 lb)	June 13, 1983 (aged 31)	(United States) Dallas Stars
91	F	Tyler Seguin	1.85 m (6 ft 1 in)	91 kg (201 lb)	January 31, 1992 (aged 23)	(United States) Dallas Stars

=== Czech Republic ===
The first 18 players were nominated on 16 March 2015 while the roster was made of 29 players on 11 April 2015. On 24 April 2015 a 28-player squad was published

Head coach: Vladimír Růžička

No.	Pos.	Name	Height	Weight	Birthdate	Team
1	G	Jakub Kovář	1.84 m (6 ft 0 in)	91 kg (201 lb)	July 19, 1988 (aged 26)	(Russia) Avtomobilist Yekaterinburg
8	D	Jan Hejda – A	1.90 m (6 ft 3 in)	95 kg (209 lb)	June 18, 1978 (aged 36)	(United States) Colorado Avalanche
10	F	Roman Červenka	1.82 m (6 ft 0 in)	89 kg (196 lb)	December 10, 1985 (aged 29)	(Russia) SKA Saint Petersburg
12	F	Jiří Novotný	1.89 m (6 ft 2 in)	97 kg (214 lb)	August 12, 1983 (aged 31)	(Russia) Lokomotiv Yaroslavl
14	F	Tomáš Plekanec	1.79 m (5 ft 10 in)	79 kg (174 lb)	October 31, 1982 (aged 32)	(Canada) Montreal Canadiens
17	F	Vladimír Sobotka	1.78 m (5 ft 10 in)	83 kg (183 lb)	July 2, 1987 (aged 27)	(Russia) Avangard Omsk
20	F	Jakub Klepiš	1.86 m (6 ft 1 in)	91 kg (201 lb)	June 5, 1984 (aged 30)	(Czech Republic) Oceláři Třinec
23	D	Ondřej Němec	1.82 m (6 ft 0 in)	92 kg (203 lb)	April 18, 1984 (aged 31)	(Russia) CSKA Moscow
24	F	Martin Zaťovič	1.80 m (5 ft 11 in)	91 kg (201 lb)	January 25, 1985 (aged 30)	(Russia) Lada Togliatti
29	D	Jan Kolář	1.90 m (6 ft 3 in)	92 kg (203 lb)	November 22, 1986 (aged 28)	(Russia) Admiral Vladivostok
30	D	Jakub Krejčík	1.87 m (6 ft 2 in)	87 kg (192 lb)	June 25, 1991 (aged 23)	(Sweden) Örebro
31	G	Ondřej Pavelec	1.89 m (6 ft 2 in)	98 kg (216 lb)	August 31, 1987 (aged 27)	(Canada) Winnipeg Jets
36	D	Petr Čáslava	1.93 m (6 ft 4 in)	100 kg (220 lb)	September 3, 1979 (aged 35)	(Czech Republic) Pardubice
42	F	Petr Koukal	1.77 m (5 ft 10 in)	87 kg (192 lb)	August 16, 1982 (aged 32)	(Finland) Jokerit
43	F	Jan Kovář	1.80 m (5 ft 11 in)	94 kg (207 lb)	March 20, 1990 (aged 25)	(Russia) Metallurg Magnitogorsk
47	D	Michal Jordán	1.85 m (6 ft 1 in)	90 kg (200 lb)	July 17, 1990 (aged 24)	(United States) Carolina Hurricanes
48	F	Tomáš Hertl	1.88 m (6 ft 2 in)	89 kg (196 lb)	November 12, 1993 (aged 21)	(United States) San Jose Sharks
53	G	Alexander Salák	1.90 m (6 ft 3 in)	89 kg (196 lb)	January 5, 1987 (aged 28)	(Russia) Sibir Novosibirsk
68	F	Jaromír Jágr – A	1.89 m (6 ft 2 in)	102 kg (225 lb)	February 15, 1972 (aged 43)	(United States) Florida Panthers
70	F	Radek Smoleňák	1.90 m (6 ft 3 in)	97 kg (214 lb)	December 3, 1986 (aged 28)	(Sweden) Modo Hockey
82	F	Michal Vondrka	1.85 m (6 ft 1 in)	90 kg (200 lb)	May 17, 1982 (aged 32)	(Czech Republic) HC Sparta Praha
87	D	Jakub Nakládal	1.87 m (6 ft 2 in)	90 kg (200 lb)	December 30, 1987 (aged 27)	(Finland) TPS
91	F	Martin Erat	1.82 m (6 ft 0 in)	91 kg (201 lb)	August 29, 1981 (aged 33)	(United States) Arizona Coyotes
93	F	Jakub Voráček – C	1.89 m (6 ft 2 in)	93 kg (205 lb)	August 15, 1989 (aged 25)	(United States) Philadelphia Flyers
94	F	Dominik Simon	1.80 m (5 ft 11 in)	80 kg (180 lb)	August 8, 1994 (aged 20)	(Czech Republic) Plzeň

=== France ===
A 49-player roster was named on 12 March 2015. On 28 April 2015 a 25-player list was published.

Head coach: Dave Henderson

No.	Pos.	Name	Height	Weight	Birthdate	Team
4	D	Antonin Manavian	1.91 m (6 ft 3 in)	102 kg (225 lb)	April 26, 1987 (aged 28)	(France) Dragons de Rouen
7	F	Yorick Treille – A	1.90 m (6 ft 3 in)	97 kg (214 lb)	July 15, 1980 (aged 34)	(France) Brûleurs de Loups de Grenoble
9	F	Damien Fleury	1.80 m (5 ft 11 in)	84 kg (185 lb)	February 1, 1986 (aged 29)	(Sweden) Djurgården
10	F	Laurent Meunier – C	1.81 m (5 ft 11 in)	84 kg (185 lb)	January 16, 1979 (aged 36)	(Germany) Straubing Tigers
12	F	Valentin Claireaux	1.80 m (5 ft 11 in)	90 kg (200 lb)	April 5, 1991 (aged 24)	(Finland) Lempäälän Kisa
14	F	Stéphane Da Costa	1.81 m (5 ft 11 in)	81 kg (179 lb)	July 11, 1989 (aged 25)	(Russia) CSKA Moscow
18	D	Yohann Auvitu	1.83 m (6 ft 0 in)	87 kg (192 lb)	July 27, 1989 (aged 25)	(Finland) HIFK
21	F	Antoine Roussel	1.83 m (6 ft 0 in)	90 kg (200 lb)	November 21, 1989 (aged 25)	(United States) Dallas Stars
24	F	Julien Desrosiers	1.78 m (5 ft 10 in)	83 kg (183 lb)	October 14, 1980 (aged 34)	(France) Dragons de Rouen
26	D	Benjamin Dieude-Fauvel	1.88 m (6 ft 2 in)	96 kg (212 lb)	August 26, 1986 (aged 28)	(United States) Iowa Wild
27	F	Loïc Lampérier	1.87 m (6 ft 2 in)	90 kg (200 lb)	August 7, 1989 (aged 25)	(France) Dragons de Rouen
28	F	Damien Raux	1.78 m (5 ft 10 in)	82 kg (181 lb)	November 3, 1984 (aged 30)	(France) Diables Rouges de Briançon
33	G	Ronan Quemener	1.86 m (6 ft 1 in)	86 kg (190 lb)	February 13, 1988 (aged 27)	(Finland) Mikkelin Jukurit
39	G	Cristobal Huet	1.83 m (6 ft 0 in)	93 kg (205 lb)	September 3, 1975 (aged 39)	(Switzerland) Lausanne
47	D	Teddy Trabichet	1.79 m (5 ft 10 in)	90 kg (200 lb)	March 10, 1987 (aged 28)	(France) Rapaces de Gap
49	G	Florian Hardy	1.83 m (6 ft 0 in)	83 kg (183 lb)	February 8, 1985 (aged 30)	(Germany) München
55	D	Jonathan Janil	1.89 m (6 ft 2 in)	93 kg (205 lb)	September 24, 1987 (aged 27)	(France) Dragons de Rouen
62	D	Florian Chakiachvili	1.86 m (6 ft 1 in)	87 kg (192 lb)	March 18, 1992 (aged 23)	(France) Diables Rouges de Briançon
71	F	Anthony Guttig	1.86 m (6 ft 1 in)	87 kg (192 lb)	October 30, 1988 (aged 26)	(Finland) Mikkelin Jukurit
74	D	Nicolas Besch	1.79 m (5 ft 10 in)	87 kg (192 lb)	October 25, 1984 (aged 30)	(Poland) GKS Tychy
77	F	Sacha Treille	1.94 m (6 ft 4 in)	95 kg (209 lb)	November 6, 1987 (aged 27)	(Germany) Straubing Tigers
80	F	Teddy Da Costa	1.80 m (5 ft 11 in)	85 kg (187 lb)	February 17, 1986 (aged 29)	(Finland) Lahti Pelicans
81	F	Anthony Rech	1.80 m (5 ft 11 in)	87 kg (192 lb)	July 9, 1992 (aged 22)	(France) Ducs de Dijon
82	F	Charles Bertrand	1.85 m (6 ft 1 in)	92 kg (203 lb)	February 5, 1991 (aged 24)	(Finland) Vaasan Sport
84	D	Kévin Hecquefeuille – A	1.81 m (5 ft 11 in)	84 kg (185 lb)	November 20, 1984 (aged 30)	(Switzerland) SCL Tigers

=== Germany ===
A 30-player roster was announced on 28 March 2015. On 28 April 2015 a 26-player list was published.

Head coach: Pat Cortina

No.	Pos.	Name	Height	Weight	Birthdate	Team
3	D	Justin Krueger	1.90 m (6 ft 3 in)	98 kg (216 lb)	October 6, 1986 (aged 28)	(Switzerland) SC Bern
9	F	Tobias Rieder	1.80 m (5 ft 11 in)	82 kg (181 lb)	January 10, 1993 (aged 22)	(United States) Arizona Coyotes
13	D	Stephan Daschner	1.80 m (5 ft 11 in)	80 kg (180 lb)	August 5, 1988 (aged 26)	(Germany) Düsseldorfer EG
15	D	Jens Baxmann	1.81 m (5 ft 11 in)	86 kg (190 lb)	March 24, 1985 (aged 30)	(Germany) Eisbären Berlin
16	F	Michael Wolf – C	1.78 m (5 ft 10 in)	85 kg (187 lb)	January 24, 1981 (aged 34)	(Germany) München
17	F	Marcus Kink – A	1.86 m (6 ft 1 in)	97 kg (214 lb)	January 13, 1985 (aged 30)	(Germany) Adler Mannheim
18	F	Kai Hospelt	1.85 m (6 ft 1 in)	86 kg (190 lb)	August 23, 1985 (aged 29)	(Germany) Adler Mannheim
19	F	Thomas Oppenheimer	1.86 m (6 ft 1 in)	87 kg (192 lb)	December 16, 1988 (aged 26)	(Germany) Hamburg Freezers
21	F	Nico Krämmer	1.86 m (6 ft 1 in)	94 kg (207 lb)	October 23, 1992 (aged 22)	(Germany) Hamburg Freezers
22	F	Matthias Plachta	1.84 m (6 ft 0 in)	99 kg (218 lb)	May 16, 1991 (aged 23)	(Germany) Adler Mannheim
33	G	Danny aus den Birken	1.86 m (6 ft 1 in)	89 kg (196 lb)	February 15, 1985 (aged 30)	(Germany) Kölner Haie
34	D	Benedikt Kohl	1.80 m (5 ft 11 in)	84 kg (185 lb)	March 31, 1988 (aged 27)	(Germany) ERC Ingolstadt
36	F	Yannic Seidenberg	1.72 m (5 ft 8 in)	82 kg (181 lb)	January 11, 1984 (aged 31)	(Germany) München
37	F	Patrick Reimer – A	1.79 m (5 ft 10 in)	86 kg (190 lb)	October 16, 1982 (aged 32)	(Germany) Thomas Sabo Ice Tigers
40	D	Björn Krupp	1.91 m (6 ft 3 in)	92 kg (203 lb)	March 6, 1991 (aged 24)	(Germany) EHC Wolfsburg
42	F	Yasin Ehliz	1.77 m (5 ft 10 in)	84 kg (185 lb)	December 30, 1992 (aged 22)	(Germany) Thomas Sabo Ice Tigers
44	G	Dennis Endras	1.82 m (6 ft 0 in)	80 kg (180 lb)	July 14, 1985 (aged 29)	(Germany) Adler Mannheim
47	F	Christoph Ullmann	1.82 m (6 ft 0 in)	90 kg (200 lb)	May 19, 1983 (aged 31)	(Germany) Adler Mannheim
50	F	Patrick Hager	1.78 m (5 ft 10 in)	80 kg (180 lb)	September 8, 1988 (aged 26)	(Germany) ERC Ingolstadt
51	G	Timo Pielmeier	1.83 m (6 ft 0 in)	82 kg (181 lb)	July 7, 1989 (aged 25)	(Germany) ERC Ingolstadt
55	D	Patrick Köppchen	1.80 m (5 ft 11 in)	88 kg (194 lb)	June 21, 1980 (aged 34)	(Germany) ERC Ingolstadt
77	D	Nikolai Goc	1.82 m (6 ft 0 in)	95 kg (209 lb)	June 17, 1986 (aged 28)	(Germany) Adler Mannheim
86	F	Daniel Pietta	1.84 m (6 ft 0 in)	94 kg (207 lb)	December 9, 1986 (aged 28)	(Germany) Krefeld Pinguine
91	D	Moritz Müller	1.87 m (6 ft 2 in)	91 kg (201 lb)	November 19, 1986 (aged 28)	(Germany) Kölner Haie
93	F	Brent Raedeke	1.83 m (6 ft 0 in)	86 kg (190 lb)	May 29, 1990 (aged 24)	(Germany) Iserlohn Roosters

=== Latvia ===
A 30-player roster was announced on 23 March 2015 of whom 26 made the cut on 31 March 2015. On 27 April 2015 a 26-player roster was named.

Head coach: Aleksandrs Beļavskis

No.	Pos.	Name	Height	Weight	Birthdate	Team
1	G	Jānis Kalniņš	1.82 m (6 ft 0 in)	87 kg (192 lb)	December 13, 1991 (aged 23)	(Hungary) DAB-Docler
3	D	Maksims Širokovs	1.81 m (5 ft 11 in)	87 kg (192 lb)	December 13, 1982 (aged 32)	(Switzerland) Red Ice
4	D	Jānis Andersons	1.87 m (6 ft 2 in)	88 kg (194 lb)	October 7, 1986 (aged 28)	(Slovakia) Dukla Trenčín
5	F	Jānis Sprukts – A	1.90 m (6 ft 3 in)	102 kg (225 lb)	January 31, 1982 (aged 33)	(Switzerland) Fribourg-Gottéron
9	D	Krišjānis Rēdlihs	1.89 m (6 ft 2 in)	93 kg (205 lb)	January 15, 1981 (aged 34)	(Latvia) Dinamo Riga
10	F	Lauris Dārziņš – A	1.91 m (6 ft 3 in)	91 kg (201 lb)	January 28, 1985 (aged 30)	(Latvia) Dinamo Riga
11	D	Kristaps Sotnieks	1.83 m (6 ft 0 in)	87 kg (192 lb)	January 29, 1987 (aged 28)	(Latvia) Dinamo Riga
13	D	Guntis Galviņš	1.86 m (6 ft 1 in)	87 kg (192 lb)	January 25, 1986 (aged 29)	(Italy) HCB South Tyrol
16	F	Kaspars Daugaviņš – C	1.83 m (6 ft 0 in)	83 kg (183 lb)	May 18, 1988 (aged 26)	(Russia) Dynamo Moscow
17	F	Kaspars Saulietis	1.85 m (6 ft 1 in)	88 kg (194 lb)	June 12, 1987 (aged 27)	(Latvia) Dinamo Riga
18	F	Rodrigo Ābols	1.91 m (6 ft 3 in)	81 kg (179 lb)	January 5, 1996 (aged 19)	(Latvia) HK Rīga
21	F	Armands Bērziņš	1.92 m (6 ft 4 in)	100 kg (220 lb)	December 27, 1983 (aged 31)	(Italy) Pustertal Wölfe
22	D	Māris Jass	1.88 m (6 ft 2 in)	90 kg (200 lb)	January 18, 1985 (aged 30)	(Czech Republic) Orli Znojmo
23	D	Aleksandrs Jerofejevs	1.90 m (6 ft 3 in)	86 kg (190 lb)	April 12, 1984 (aged 31)	(Latvia) Dinamo Riga
24	F	Miķelis Rēdlihs	1.81 m (5 ft 11 in)	81 kg (179 lb)	July 1, 1984 (aged 30)	(Latvia) Dinamo Riga
25	F	Andris Džeriņš	1.85 m (6 ft 1 in)	85 kg (187 lb)	February 14, 1988 (aged 27)	(Latvia) Dinamo Riga
31	G	Edgars Masaļskis	1.75 m (5 ft 9 in)	78 kg (172 lb)	March 31, 1980 (aged 35)	(Switzerland) Ambrì-Piotta
33	G	Ervīns Muštukovs	1.84 m (6 ft 0 in)	85 kg (187 lb)	April 7, 1984 (aged 31)	(Denmark) Aalborg Pirates
44	D	Oskars Cibuļskis	1.88 m (6 ft 2 in)	86 kg (190 lb)	April 9, 1988 (aged 27)	(Latvia) Dinamo Riga
47	F	Mārtiņš Cipulis	1.81 m (5 ft 11 in)	82 kg (181 lb)	November 29, 1980 (aged 34)	(Latvia) Dinamo Riga
59	F	Lauris Bajaruns	1.96 m (6 ft 5 in)	94 kg (207 lb)	March 31, 1989 (aged 26)	(Denmark) Nordsjælland Cobras
70	F	Miks Indrašis	1.92 m (6 ft 4 in)	85 kg (187 lb)	September 30, 1990 (aged 24)	(Latvia) Dinamo Riga
71	F	Roberts Bukarts	1.84 m (6 ft 0 in)	84 kg (185 lb)	June 27, 1990 (aged 24)	(Latvia) Dinamo Riga
73	F	Gunārs Skvorcovs	1.86 m (6 ft 1 in)	86 kg (190 lb)	January 13, 1990 (aged 25)	(Latvia) Dinamo Riga
90	F	Koba Jass	1.83 m (6 ft 0 in)	87 kg (192 lb)	May 1, 1990 (aged 25)	(Czech Republic) Bílí Tygři Liberec

=== Sweden ===
A 22-player roster was announced on 6 April 2015. On 15 April 2015 a 24-player squad was named. On 28 April 2015 a 28-player squad was revealed.

Head coach: Pär Mårts

No.	Pos.	Name	Height	Weight	Birthdate	Team
1	G	Jhonas Enroth	1.80 m (5 ft 11 in)	75 kg (165 lb)	June 25, 1988 (aged 26)	(United States) Dallas Stars
3	D	John Klingberg	1.88 m (6 ft 2 in)	82 kg (181 lb)	August 14, 1992 (aged 22)	(United States) Dallas Stars
4	D	Staffan Kronwall – C	1.95 m (6 ft 5 in)	105 kg (231 lb)	September 10, 1982 (aged 32)	(Russia) Lokomotiv Yaroslavl
8	D	Petter Granberg	1.90 m (6 ft 3 in)	93 kg (205 lb)	August 27, 1992 (aged 22)	(Canada) Toronto Maple Leafs
9	F	Filip Forsberg	1.88 m (6 ft 2 in)	94 kg (207 lb)	August 13, 1994 (aged 20)	(United States) Nashville Predators
10	F	Joakim Lindström	1.83 m (6 ft 0 in)	85 kg (187 lb)	December 5, 1983 (aged 31)	(Canada) Toronto Maple Leafs
11	F	Simon Hjalmarsson	1.84 m (6 ft 0 in)	78 kg (172 lb)	February 1, 1989 (aged 26)	(Russia) CSKA Moscow
14	D	Mattias Ekholm	1.93 m (6 ft 4 in)	93 kg (205 lb)	May 24, 1990 (aged 24)	(United States) Nashville Predators
15	F	Mattias Sjögren	1.89 m (6 ft 2 in)	97 kg (214 lb)	November 27, 1987 (aged 27)	(Sweden) Linköpings HC
16	F	Jacob Josefson	1.85 m (6 ft 1 in)	86 kg (190 lb)	March 2, 1991 (aged 24)	(United States) New Jersey Devils
20	F	Joel Lundqvist – A	1.84 m (6 ft 0 in)	91 kg (201 lb)	March 2, 1982 (aged 33)	(Sweden) Frölunda HC
21	F	Loui Eriksson	1.88 m (6 ft 2 in)	89 kg (196 lb)	July 17, 1985 (aged 29)	(United States) Boston Bruins
23	D	Oliver Ekman-Larsson	1.88 m (6 ft 2 in)	91 kg (201 lb)	July 17, 1991 (aged 23)	(United States) Arizona Coyotes
27	F	Jimmie Ericsson – A	1.87 m (6 ft 2 in)	94 kg (207 lb)	February 22, 1980 (aged 35)	(Russia) SKA Saint Petersburg
28	F	Elias Lindholm	1.85 m (6 ft 1 in)	87 kg (192 lb)	December 2, 1994 (aged 20)	(United States) Carolina Hurricanes
31	G	Anders Nilsson	1.95 m (6 ft 5 in)	103 kg (227 lb)	March 19, 1990 (aged 25)	(Russia) Ak Bars Kazan
35	G	Markus Svensson	1.85 m (6 ft 1 in)	89 kg (196 lb)	July 9, 1984 (aged 30)	(Sweden) Skellefteå AIK
44	F	Nicklas Danielsson	1.84 m (6 ft 0 in)	83 kg (183 lb)	December 7, 1984 (aged 30)	(Switzerland) Rapperswil-Jona Lakers
45	F	Oscar Möller	1.78 m (5 ft 10 in)	82 kg (181 lb)	January 22, 1989 (aged 26)	(Russia) Ak Bars Kazan
48	D	Daniel Rahimi	1.90 m (6 ft 3 in)	95 kg (209 lb)	April 28, 1987 (aged 28)	(Sweden) Linköpings HC
49	F	Victor Rask	1.88 m (6 ft 2 in)	91 kg (201 lb)	March 1, 1993 (aged 22)	(United States) Carolina Hurricanes
51	D	Jonas Ahnelöv	1.90 m (6 ft 3 in)	97 kg (214 lb)	December 11, 1987 (aged 27)	(Sweden) Modo Hockey
53	F	Andreas Thuresson	1.85 m (6 ft 1 in)	92 kg (203 lb)	November 18, 1987 (aged 27)	(Russia) Severstal Cherepovets
58	F	Anton Lander	1.83 m (6 ft 0 in)	85 kg (187 lb)	April 24, 1991 (aged 24)	(Canada) Edmonton Oilers
84	D	Oscar Klefbom	1.91 m (6 ft 3 in)	95 kg (209 lb)	July 20, 1993 (aged 21)	(Canada) Edmonton Oilers

=== Switzerland ===
A 22-player roster was announced on 23 March 2015, while on 3 April 2015 a few changes were made and 25 players were selected. On 18 April 2015 a 26-player roster was named. A 25-player roster was revealed on 28 April 2015.

Head coach: Glen Hanlon

No.	Pos.	Name	Height	Weight	Birthdate	Team
4	D	Patrick Geering	1.78 m (5 ft 10 in)	84 kg (185 lb)	February 12, 1990 (aged 25)	(Switzerland) ZSC Lions
6	D	Timo Helbling	1.90 m (6 ft 3 in)	100 kg (220 lb)	July 21, 1981 (aged 33)	(Switzerland) HC Fribourg-Gottéron
7	D	Mark Streit – C	1.81 m (5 ft 11 in)	93 kg (205 lb)	December 11, 1977 (aged 37)	(United States) Philadelphia Flyers
10	F	Andres Ambühl – A	1.76 m (5 ft 9 in)	82 kg (181 lb)	September 14, 1983 (aged 31)	(Switzerland) HC Davos
13	D	Félicien Du Bois	1.87 m (6 ft 2 in)	84 kg (185 lb)	October 18, 1983 (aged 31)	(Switzerland) HC Davos
19	F	Reto Schäppi	1.93 m (6 ft 4 in)	94 kg (207 lb)	January 27, 1991 (aged 24)	(Switzerland) ZSC Lions
20	G	Reto Berra	1.94 m (6 ft 4 in)	89 kg (196 lb)	January 3, 1987 (aged 28)	(United States) Colorado Avalanche
21	F	Kevin Fiala	1.80 m (5 ft 11 in)	85 kg (187 lb)	July 22, 1996 (aged 18)	(United States) Nashville Predators
23	F	Simon Bodenmann	1.78 m (5 ft 10 in)	83 kg (183 lb)	March 2, 1988 (aged 27)	(Switzerland) Kloten Flyers
26	F	Reto Suri	1.83 m (6 ft 0 in)	84 kg (185 lb)	March 25, 1989 (aged 26)	(Switzerland) EV Zug
34	D	Dean Kukan	1.87 m (6 ft 2 in)	90 kg (200 lb)	August 9, 1993 (aged 21)	(Sweden) Luleå HF
43	F	Morris Trachsler	1.83 m (6 ft 0 in)	90 kg (200 lb)	July 15, 1984 (aged 30)	(Switzerland) ZSC Lions
48	F	Matthias Bieber	1.81 m (5 ft 11 in)	85 kg (187 lb)	March 14, 1986 (aged 29)	(Switzerland) Kloten Flyers
55	D	Romain Loeffel	1.76 m (5 ft 9 in)	81 kg (179 lb)	March 10, 1991 (aged 24)	(Switzerland) Genève-Servette HC
56	F	Dino Wieser	1.81 m (5 ft 11 in)	83 kg (183 lb)	June 13, 1989 (aged 25)	(Switzerland) HC Davos
58	D	Eric Blum	1.78 m (5 ft 10 in)	82 kg (181 lb)	June 13, 1986 (aged 28)	(Switzerland) SC Bern
63	G	Leonardo Genoni	1.80 m (5 ft 11 in)	80 kg (180 lb)	August 27, 1987 (aged 27)	(Switzerland) HC Davos
70	F	Denis Hollenstein	1.83 m (6 ft 0 in)	88 kg (194 lb)	October 15, 1989 (aged 25)	(Switzerland) Kloten Flyers
77	D	Robin Grossmann	1.80 m (5 ft 11 in)	85 kg (187 lb)	August 17, 1987 (aged 27)	(Switzerland) EV Zug
79	G	Daniel Manzato	1.83 m (6 ft 0 in)	82 kg (181 lb)	January 17, 1984 (aged 31)	(Switzerland) HC Lugano
88	F	Kevin Romy	1.82 m (6 ft 0 in)	86 kg (190 lb)	January 31, 1985 (aged 30)	(Switzerland) Genève-Servette HC
89	F	Cody Almond	1.88 m (6 ft 2 in)	90 kg (200 lb)	July 24, 1989 (aged 25)	(Switzerland) Genève-Servette HC
90	D	Roman Josi – A	1.86 m (6 ft 1 in)	88 kg (194 lb)	June 1, 1990 (aged 24)	(United States) Nashville Predators
95	F	Julian Walker	1.87 m (6 ft 2 in)	94 kg (207 lb)	September 10, 1986 (aged 28)	(Switzerland) HC Lugano
96	F	Damien Brunner	1.80 m (5 ft 11 in)	85 kg (187 lb)	March 9, 1986 (aged 29)	(Switzerland) HC Lugano

== Group B ==
=== Belarus ===
A 27-player roster was announced on 24 March 2015.

Head coach: Dave Lewis

No.	Pos.	Name	Height	Weight	Birthdate	Team
1	G	Vitali Koval	1.88 m (6 ft 2 in)	97 kg (214 lb)	March 31, 1980 (aged 35)	(Russia) Salavat Yulaev Ufa
5	D	Nikolai Stasenko	1.95 m (6 ft 5 in)	95 kg (209 lb)	February 15, 1987 (aged 28)	(Russia) Severstal Cherepovets
8	D	Ilya Shinkevich	1.89 m (6 ft 2 in)	86 kg (190 lb)	September 1, 1989 (aged 25)	(Belarus) HC Dinamo Minsk
11	F	Alexander Kulakov	1.82 m (6 ft 0 in)	91 kg (201 lb)	May 14, 1983 (aged 31)	(Belarus) HC Dinamo Minsk
13	F	Sergei Drozd	1.81 m (5 ft 11 in)	77 kg (170 lb)	April 14, 1990 (aged 25)	(Belarus) HC Dinamo Minsk
14	D	Yevgeni Lisovets	1.83 m (6 ft 0 in)	90 kg (200 lb)	November 12, 1994 (aged 20)	(Belarus) HC Dinamo Minsk
15	F	Artem Demkov	1.78 m (5 ft 10 in)	78 kg (172 lb)	September 26, 1989 (aged 25)	(Belarus) HC Dinamo Minsk
17	F	Alexei Kalyuzhny – C	1.77 m (5 ft 10 in)	86 kg (190 lb)	June 13, 1977 (aged 37)	(Belarus) HC Dinamo Minsk
22	D	Oleg Goroshko	1.78 m (5 ft 10 in)	84 kg (185 lb)	November 19, 1989 (aged 25)	(Belarus) HC Dinamo Minsk
23	F	Andrei Stas	1.89 m (6 ft 2 in)	88 kg (194 lb)	October 18, 1988 (aged 26)	(Russia) CSKA Moscow
25	D	Oleg Yevenko	2.01 m (6 ft 7 in)	104 kg (229 lb)	January 21, 1991 (aged 24)	(United States) Adirondack Flames
26	D	Nikita Ustinenko	1.86 m (6 ft 1 in)	78 kg (172 lb)	April 22, 1995 (aged 20)	(Belarus) HK Gomel
27	F	Alexei Yefimenko	1.85 m (6 ft 1 in)	90 kg (200 lb)	August 20, 1985 (aged 29)	(Russia) Sibir Novosibirsk
31	G	Igor Brikun	1.80 m (5 ft 11 in)	80 kg (180 lb)	September 6, 1986 (aged 28)	(Belarus) HK Gomel
35	G	Kevin Lalande	1.82 m (6 ft 0 in)	83 kg (183 lb)	February 19, 1987 (aged 28)	(Russia) CSKA Moscow
46	F	Andrei Kostitsyn – A	1.83 m (6 ft 0 in)	98 kg (216 lb)	February 3, 1985 (aged 30)	(Russia) HC Sochi
57	D	Ivan Usenko	1.83 m (6 ft 0 in)	92 kg (203 lb)	February 12, 1983 (aged 32)	(Belarus) HC Dinamo Minsk
59	F	Sergei Demagin	1.83 m (6 ft 0 in)	84 kg (185 lb)	July 19, 1986 (aged 28)	(Russia) Torpedo Nizhny Novgorod
61	F	Andrei Stepanov	1.78 m (5 ft 10 in)	91 kg (201 lb)	April 14, 1986 (aged 29)	(Belarus) HC Dinamo Minsk
74	F	Sergei Kostitsyn	1.83 m (6 ft 0 in)	95 kg (209 lb)	March 20, 1987 (aged 28)	(Russia) Ak Bars Kazan
77	F	Alexander Kitarov	1.90 m (6 ft 3 in)	96 kg (212 lb)	June 18, 1987 (aged 27)	(Belarus) HC Dinamo Minsk
85	F	Artyom Volkov	1.83 m (6 ft 0 in)	84 kg (185 lb)	January 28, 1985 (aged 30)	(Russia) Avangard Omsk
88	F	Evgeni Kovyrshin	1.78 m (5 ft 10 in)	78 kg (172 lb)	January 25, 1986 (aged 29)	(Russia) Severstal Cherepovets
89	D	Dmitry Korobov – A	1.90 m (6 ft 3 in)	108 kg (238 lb)	March 12, 1989 (aged 26)	(Russia) Atlant Moscow Oblast
91	F	Artur Gavrus	1.79 m (5 ft 10 in)	84 kg (185 lb)	January 3, 1994 (aged 21)	(Belarus) HC Dinamo Minsk

=== Denmark ===
Head coach: Janne Karlsson

No.	Pos.	Name	Height	Weight	Birthdate	Team
1	G	Patrick Galbraith	1.83 m (6 ft 0 in)	81 kg (179 lb)	March 11, 1986 (aged 29)	(Sweden) Karlskrona HK
4	D	Mads Bødker	1.75 m (5 ft 9 in)	80 kg (180 lb)	August 31, 1987 (aged 27)	(Denmark) SønderjyskE
5	D	Daniel Nielsen	1.83 m (6 ft 0 in)	80 kg (180 lb)	October 31, 1980 (aged 34)	(Denmark) Herning Blue Fox
8	D	Bjørn Uldall	1.80 m (5 ft 11 in)	76 kg (168 lb)	April 10, 1994 (aged 21)	(Denmark) Herning Blue Fox
9	F	Frederik Storm	1.80 m (5 ft 11 in)	86 kg (190 lb)	February 20, 1989 (aged 26)	(Sweden) Malmö Redhawks
11	F	Patrick Bjorkstrand	1.84 m (6 ft 0 in)	87 kg (192 lb)	July 1, 1992 (aged 22)	(Croatia) KHL Medveščak Zagreb
13	F	Morten Green – C	1.83 m (6 ft 0 in)	88 kg (194 lb)	March 19, 1981 (aged 34)	(Germany) Schwenninger Wild Wings
14	F	Kirill Starkov	1.84 m (6 ft 0 in)	95 kg (209 lb)	March 31, 1987 (aged 28)	(Switzerland) HC Red Ice
19	F	Kim Staal	1.82 m (6 ft 0 in)	87 kg (192 lb)	March 10, 1978 (aged 37)	(Japan) Tohoku Free Blades
22	D	Markus Lauridsen	1.88 m (6 ft 2 in)	89 kg (196 lb)	February 28, 1991 (aged 24)	(United States) Lake Erie Monsters
25	D	Oliver Lauridsen	1.97 m (6 ft 6 in)	104 kg (229 lb)	March 24, 1989 (aged 26)	(United States) Lehigh Valley Phantoms
27	F	Oliver Bjorkstrand	1.83 m (6 ft 0 in)	79 kg (174 lb)	April 10, 1995 (aged 20)	(United States) Portland Winterhawks
28	D	Emil Kristensen	1.84 m (6 ft 0 in)	81 kg (179 lb)	September 20, 1992 (aged 22)	(Sweden) IK Oskarshamn
29	F	Morten Madsen – A	1.90 m (6 ft 3 in)	87 kg (192 lb)	January 16, 1987 (aged 28)	(Germany) Hamburg Freezers
31	G	Simon Nielsen	1.88 m (6 ft 2 in)	86 kg (190 lb)	October 27, 1986 (aged 28)	(Norway) Lørenskog IK
32	G	Sebastian Dahm	1.82 m (6 ft 0 in)	80 kg (180 lb)	February 28, 1987 (aged 28)	(Denmark) Rødovre Mighty Bulls
33	F	Julian Jakobsen	1.84 m (6 ft 0 in)	87 kg (192 lb)	April 11, 1987 (aged 28)	(Germany) Hamburg Freezers
37	F	Anders Poulsen	1.82 m (6 ft 0 in)	86 kg (190 lb)	January 18, 1991 (aged 24)	(Sweden) IK Oskarshamn
38	F	Morten Poulsen	1.84 m (6 ft 0 in)	84 kg (185 lb)	September 9, 1988 (aged 26)	(Sweden) IK Oskarshamn
40	F	Jesper Jensen – A	1.83 m (6 ft 0 in)	80 kg (180 lb)	February 5, 1987 (aged 28)	(Sweden) Rögle BK
41	D	Jesper Jensen	1.83 m (6 ft 0 in)	84 kg (185 lb)	July 30, 1991 (aged 23)	(Sweden) Färjestad BK
43	F	Nichlas Hardt	1.77 m (5 ft 10 in)	80 kg (180 lb)	July 6, 1988 (aged 26)	(Sweden) Linköpings HC
48	F	Nicholas Jensen	1.89 m (6 ft 2 in)	90 kg (200 lb)	April 8, 1989 (aged 26)	(Denmark) Aalborg Pirates
50	F	Mathias Bau Hansen	2.00 m (6 ft 7 in)	108 kg (238 lb)	July 3, 1993 (aged 21)	(Denmark) Frederikshavn White Hawks
53	F	Thomas Spelling	1.86 m (6 ft 1 in)	80 kg (180 lb)	February 9, 1993 (aged 22)	(Denmark) SønderjyskE

=== Finland ===
A 27-player roster was announced on 7 April 2015. On 27 April 2015 a 25-player squad was named, with the third goalkeeper being announced at a later date. Pekka Rinne was named as the third goalkeeper on 27 April 2015.

Head coach: Kari Jalonen

No.	Pos.	Name	Height	Weight	Birthdate	Team
2	D	Jyrki Jokipakka	1.90 m (6 ft 3 in)	90 kg (200 lb)	August 20, 1991 (aged 23)	(United States) Dallas Stars
6	D	Tuukka Mäntylä	1.73 m (5 ft 8 in)	82 kg (181 lb)	May 25, 1981 (aged 33)	(Russia) Amur Khabarovsk
7	D	Esa Lindell	1.91 m (6 ft 3 in)	94 kg (207 lb)	May 23, 1994 (aged 20)	(Finland) Ässät
15	F	Tuomo Ruutu – A	1.84 m (6 ft 0 in)	94 kg (207 lb)	February 16, 1983 (aged 32)	(United States) New Jersey Devils
16	F	Aleksander Barkov, Jr.	1.91 m (6 ft 3 in)	96 kg (212 lb)	September 2, 1995 (aged 19)	(United States) Florida Panthers
18	D	Sami Lepistö – A	1.85 m (6 ft 1 in)	88 kg (194 lb)	October 17, 1984 (aged 30)	(Russia) Avtomobilist Yekaterinburg
20	F	Janne Pesonen	1.81 m (5 ft 11 in)	83 kg (183 lb)	May 11, 1982 (aged 32)	(Sweden) Skellefteå AIK
23	F	Ossi Louhivaara	1.86 m (6 ft 1 in)	89 kg (196 lb)	August 31, 1983 (aged 31)	(Switzerland) Lausanne HC
24	F	Joonas Kemppainen	1.88 m (6 ft 2 in)	95 kg (209 lb)	April 7, 1988 (aged 27)	(Finland) Oulun Kärpät
25	F	Juha-Pekka Hytönen	1.78 m (5 ft 10 in)	84 kg (185 lb)	May 22, 1981 (aged 33)	(Switzerland) Lausanne HC
26	F	Jarkko Immonen	1.86 m (6 ft 1 in)	96 kg (212 lb)	April 19, 1982 (aged 33)	(Russia) Torpedo Nizhny Novgorod
27	F	Petri Kontiola	1.82 m (6 ft 0 in)	92 kg (203 lb)	October 4, 1984 (aged 30)	(Russia) Lokomotiv Yaroslavl
28	D	Anssi Salmela	1.85 m (6 ft 1 in)	91 kg (201 lb)	August 13, 1984 (aged 30)	(Sweden) Färjestad BK
32	G	Juuse Saros	1.79 m (5 ft 10 in)	82 kg (181 lb)	April 19, 1995 (aged 20)	(Finland) HPK
33	G	Atte Engren	1.85 m (6 ft 1 in)	84 kg (185 lb)	February 19, 1988 (aged 27)	(Russia) Atlant Moscow Oblast
35	G	Pekka Rinne	1.96 m (6 ft 5 in)	89 kg (196 lb)	November 3, 1982 (aged 32)	(United States) Nashville Predators
36	F	Jussi Jokinen – C	1.83 m (6 ft 0 in)	87 kg (192 lb)	April 1, 1983 (aged 32)	(United States) Florida Panthers
38	D	Juuso Hietanen	1.80 m (5 ft 11 in)	85 kg (187 lb)	June 14, 1985 (aged 29)	(Russia) Torpedo Nizhny Novgorod
41	F	Antti Pihlström	1.80 m (5 ft 11 in)	82 kg (181 lb)	October 22, 1984 (aged 30)	(Russia) Salavat Yulaev Ufa
50	F	Juhamatti Aaltonen	1.84 m (6 ft 0 in)	85 kg (187 lb)	June 4, 1985 (aged 29)	(Finland) Jokerit
55	D	Atte Ohtamaa	1.88 m (6 ft 2 in)	92 kg (203 lb)	November 6, 1987 (aged 27)	(Finland) Jokerit
63	D	Topi Jaakola	1.88 m (6 ft 2 in)	90 kg (200 lb)	November 15, 1983 (aged 31)	(Finland) Jokerit
70	F	Teemu Hartikainen	1.86 m (6 ft 1 in)	100 kg (220 lb)	May 3, 1990 (aged 24)	(Russia) Salavat Yulaev Ufa
71	F	Leo Komarov	1.80 m (5 ft 11 in)	90 kg (200 lb)	January 23, 1987 (aged 28)	(Canada) Toronto Maple Leafs
72	F	Joonas Donskoi	1.83 m (6 ft 0 in)	84 kg (185 lb)	April 13, 1992 (aged 23)	(Finland) Oulun Kärpät

=== Norway ===
A 24-player roster was announced on 29 March 2015. A 25-player squad was revealed on 27 April 2015.

Head coach: Roy Johansen

No.	Pos.	Name	Height	Weight	Birthdate	Team
6	D	Jonas Holøs	1.80 m (5 ft 11 in)	93 kg (205 lb)	August 27, 1987 (aged 27)	(Russia) Lokomotiv Yaroslavl
8	F	Mathias Trettenes	1.78 m (5 ft 10 in)	76 kg (168 lb)	November 8, 1993 (aged 21)	(Norway) Stavanger Oilers
10	D	Mattias Nørstebø	1.79 m (5 ft 10 in)	82 kg (181 lb)	June 3, 1995 (aged 19)	(Sweden) Brynäs IF
11	F	Andreas Stene	1.90 m (6 ft 3 in)	91 kg (201 lb)	March 1, 1991 (aged 24)	(Norway) Vålerenga Ishockey
14	F	Jonas Djupvik Løvlie	1.88 m (6 ft 2 in)	87 kg (192 lb)	October 14, 1990 (aged 24)	(Sweden) Södertälje SK
17	D	Stefan Espeland	1.84 m (6 ft 0 in)	84 kg (185 lb)	March 24, 1989 (aged 26)	(Norway) Vålerenga Ishockey
20	F	Anders Bastiansen – A	1.90 m (6 ft 3 in)	93 kg (205 lb)	October 31, 1980 (aged 34)	(Austria) Graz 99ers
21	F	Morten Ask	1.85 m (6 ft 1 in)	88 kg (194 lb)	May 14, 1980 (aged 34)	(Norway) Vålerenga Ishockey
22	F	Martin Røymark	1.84 m (6 ft 0 in)	86 kg (190 lb)	November 10, 1986 (aged 28)	(Sweden) Färjestad BK
23	D	Mats Trygg	1.79 m (5 ft 10 in)	85 kg (187 lb)	June 1, 1976 (aged 38)	(Norway) Lørenskog IK
24	F	Andreas Martinsen	1.90 m (6 ft 3 in)	100 kg (220 lb)	June 13, 1990 (aged 24)	(Germany) Düsseldorfer EG
26	F	Kristian Forsberg	1.85 m (6 ft 1 in)	92 kg (203 lb)	May 5, 1986 (aged 28)	(Norway) Stavanger Oilers
28	F	Niklas Roest	1.74 m (5 ft 9 in)	80 kg (180 lb)	August 3, 1986 (aged 28)	(Norway) Sparta Warriors
29	F	Robin Dahlstrøm	1.83 m (6 ft 0 in)	100 kg (220 lb)	January 29, 1988 (aged 27)	(Sweden) Örebro HK
30	G	Lars Haugen	1.83 m (6 ft 0 in)	83 kg (183 lb)	March 19, 1987 (aged 28)	(Belarus) Dinamo Minsk
31	G	Lars Volden	1.90 m (6 ft 3 in)	87 kg (192 lb)	July 26, 1992 (aged 22)	(Sweden) Rögle BK
40	F	Ken André Olimb	1.79 m (5 ft 10 in)	81 kg (179 lb)	January 21, 1989 (aged 26)	(Germany) Düsseldorfer EG
41	F	Patrick Thoresen – A	1.83 m (6 ft 0 in)	90 kg (200 lb)	November 7, 1983 (aged 31)	(Russia) SKA Saint Petersburg
42	D	Henrik Ødegaard	1.79 m (5 ft 10 in)	85 kg (187 lb)	February 12, 1988 (aged 27)	(Norway) Lørenskog IK
46	F	Mathis Olimb	1.79 m (5 ft 10 in)	83 kg (183 lb)	February 1, 1986 (aged 29)	(Sweden) Frölunda HC
47	D	Alexander Bonsaksen	1.80 m (5 ft 11 in)	84 kg (185 lb)	January 24, 1987 (aged 28)	(Finland) Tappara
51	F	Mats Rosseli Olsen	1.80 m (5 ft 11 in)	83 kg (183 lb)	April 29, 1991 (aged 24)	(Sweden) Frölunda HC
55	D	Ole-Kristian Tollefsen – C	1.88 m (6 ft 2 in)	94 kg (207 lb)	March 29, 1984 (aged 31)	(Sweden) Färjestad BK
70	G	Steffen Søberg	1.77 m (5 ft 10 in)	78 kg (172 lb)	August 6, 1993 (aged 21)	(Norway) Vålerenga Ishockey
90	D	Daniel Sørvik	1.83 m (6 ft 0 in)	83 kg (183 lb)	March 11, 1990 (aged 25)	(Norway) Vålerenga Ishockey

=== Russia ===
A 23-player roster was announced on 5 April 2015.

Head coach: Oleg Znarok

No.	Pos.	Name	Height	Weight	Birthdate	Team
7	D	Dmitri Kulikov	1.85 m (6 ft 1 in)	84 kg (185 lb)	October 29, 1990 (aged 24)	(United States) Florida Panthers
8	F	Alexander Ovechkin	1.89 m (6 ft 2 in)	99 kg (218 lb)	September 17, 1985 (aged 29)	(United States) Washington Capitals
9	F	Artemy Panarin	1.80 m (5 ft 11 in)	87 kg (192 lb)	October 30, 1991 (aged 23)	(Russia) SKA Saint Petersburg
10	F	Sergei Mozyakin	1.80 m (5 ft 11 in)	84 kg (185 lb)	March 30, 1981 (aged 34)	(Russia) Metallurg Magnitogorsk
11	F	Evgeni Malkin – A	1.91 m (6 ft 3 in)	91 kg (201 lb)	July 31, 1986 (aged 28)	(United States) Pittsburgh Penguins
14	F	Viktor Tikhonov	1.88 m (6 ft 2 in)	83 kg (183 lb)	May 12, 1988 (aged 26)	(Russia) SKA Saint Petersburg
16	F	Sergei Plotnikov	1.88 m (6 ft 2 in)	90 kg (200 lb)	June 3, 1990 (aged 24)	(Russia) Lokomotiv Yaroslavl
25	F	Danis Zaripov	1.84 m (6 ft 0 in)	88 kg (194 lb)	March 26, 1981 (aged 34)	(Russia) Metallurg Magnitogorsk
30	G	Konstantin Barulin	1.86 m (6 ft 1 in)	92 kg (203 lb)	September 4, 1984 (aged 30)	(Russia) Avangard Omsk
31	G	Anton Khudobin	1.80 m (5 ft 11 in)	88 kg (194 lb)	May 7, 1986 (aged 28)	(United States) Carolina Hurricanes
41	F	Nikolay Kulemin	1.85 m (6 ft 1 in)	96 kg (212 lb)	July 14, 1986 (aged 28)	(United States) New York Islanders
42	F	Artem Anisimov	1.92 m (6 ft 4 in)	82 kg (181 lb)	May 24, 1988 (aged 26)	(United States) Columbus Blue Jackets
44	D	Egor Yakovlev	1.81 m (5 ft 11 in)	80 kg (180 lb)	September 17, 1991 (aged 23)	(Russia) Lokomotiv Yaroslavl
48	D	Yevgeny Biryukov	1.86 m (6 ft 1 in)	93 kg (205 lb)	April 19, 1986 (aged 29)	(Russia) Metallurg Magnitogorsk
52	F	Sergei Shirokov	1.78 m (5 ft 10 in)	89 kg (196 lb)	March 10, 1986 (aged 29)	(Russia) Avangard Omsk
63	F	Evgenii Dadonov	1.79 m (5 ft 10 in)	76 kg (168 lb)	March 12, 1989 (aged 26)	(Russia) SKA Saint Petersburg
71	F	Ilya Kovalchuk – C	1.89 m (6 ft 2 in)	103 kg (227 lb)	April 15, 1983 (aged 32)	(Russia) SKA Saint Petersburg
72	G	Sergei Bobrovsky	1.88 m (6 ft 2 in)	86 kg (190 lb)	September 20, 1988 (aged 26)	(United States) Columbus Blue Jackets
73	D	Maxim Chudinov	1.80 m (5 ft 11 in)	92 kg (203 lb)	March 25, 1990 (aged 25)	(Russia) SKA Saint Petersburg
77	D	Anton Belov	1.93 m (6 ft 4 in)	98 kg (216 lb)	July 29, 1986 (aged 28)	(Russia) SKA Saint Petersburg
82	D	Yevgeny Medvedev – A	1.90 m (6 ft 3 in)	87 kg (192 lb)	August 27, 1982 (aged 32)	(Russia) Ak Bars Kazan
87	F	Vadim Shipachyov	1.85 m (6 ft 1 in)	83 kg (183 lb)	March 12, 1987 (aged 28)	(Russia) SKA Saint Petersburg
91	F	Vladimir Tarasenko	1.82 m (6 ft 0 in)	95 kg (209 lb)	December 13, 1991 (aged 23)	(United States) St. Louis Blues
93	D	Viktor Antipin	1.81 m (5 ft 11 in)	79 kg (174 lb)	December 6, 1992 (aged 22)	(Russia) Metallurg Magnitogorsk
94	D	Andrei Mironov	1.88 m (6 ft 2 in)	88 kg (194 lb)	July 29, 1994 (aged 20)	(Russia) HC Dynamo Moscow

=== Slovakia ===
A 20-player roster was announced on 19 March 2015.

Head coach: Vladimír Vůjtek

No.	Pos.	Name	Height	Weight	Birthdate	Team
3	D	Adam Jánošík	1.80 m (5 ft 11 in)	80 kg (180 lb)	September 7, 1992 (aged 22)	(Slovakia) HC Košice
7	D	Ivan Baranka	1.88 m (6 ft 2 in)	92 kg (203 lb)	May 19, 1985 (aged 29)	(Slovakia) HC Slovan Bratislava
8	D	Michal Sersen	1.88 m (6 ft 2 in)	92 kg (203 lb)	December 28, 1985 (aged 29)	(Slovakia) HC Slovan Bratislava
12	F	Marián Gáborík	1.86 m (6 ft 1 in)	91 kg (201 lb)	February 14, 1982 (aged 33)	(United States) Los Angeles Kings
13	F	Tomáš Jurčo	1.88 m (6 ft 2 in)	85 kg (187 lb)	December 28, 1992 (aged 22)	(United States) Detroit Red Wings
14	D	Andrej Meszároš	1.88 m (6 ft 2 in)	99 kg (218 lb)	October 13, 1985 (aged 29)	(United States) Buffalo Sabres
19	F	Michel Miklík	1.84 m (6 ft 0 in)	90 kg (200 lb)	July 31, 1982 (aged 32)	(Russia) Amur Khabarovsk
22	F	Vladimír Dravecký	1.82 m (6 ft 0 in)	90 kg (200 lb)	June 3, 1985 (aged 29)	(Czech Republic) HC Oceláři Třinec
25	F	Marek Viedenský	1.92 m (6 ft 4 in)	88 kg (194 lb)	August 18, 1990 (aged 24)	(Finland) HPK
26	D	Juraj Mikuš	1.94 m (6 ft 4 in)	100 kg (220 lb)	November 30, 1988 (aged 26)	(Czech Republic) HC Sparta Praha
28	F	Richard Pánik	1.88 m (6 ft 2 in)	92 kg (203 lb)	February 7, 1991 (aged 24)	(Canada) Toronto Maple Leafs
42	G	Branislav Konrád	1.88 m (6 ft 2 in)	85 kg (187 lb)	October 10, 1987 (aged 27)	(Slovakia) HC Dukla Trenčín
43	F	Tomáš Surový	1.86 m (6 ft 1 in)	98 kg (216 lb)	September 24, 1981 (aged 33)	(Slovakia) HC ’05 Banská Bystrica
50	G	Ján Laco	1.83 m (6 ft 0 in)	86 kg (190 lb)	December 1, 1981 (aged 33)	(Kazakhstan) Barys Astana
51	D	Dominik Graňák – A	1.82 m (6 ft 0 in)	81 kg (179 lb)	June 11, 1983 (aged 31)	(Switzerland) HC Fribourg-Gottéron
55	F	Mário Bližňák	1.83 m (6 ft 0 in)	89 kg (196 lb)	March 6, 1987 (aged 28)	(Czech Republic) HC Plzeň
56	F	Marko Daňo	1.82 m (6 ft 0 in)	90 kg (200 lb)	November 30, 1994 (aged 20)	(United States) Columbus Blue Jackets
61	F	Milan Bartovič – A	1.82 m (6 ft 0 in)	88 kg (194 lb)	April 9, 1981 (aged 34)	(Slovakia) HC Slovan Bratislava
68	D	Milan Jurčina	1.93 m (6 ft 4 in)	110 kg (240 lb)	June 7, 1983 (aged 31)	(Latvia) Dinamo Riga
71	D	Marek Ďaloga	1.93 m (6 ft 4 in)	83 kg (183 lb)	March 10, 1989 (aged 26)	(Czech Republic) HC Sparta Praha
79	F	Libor Hudáček	1.75 m (5 ft 9 in)	75 kg (165 lb)	September 7, 1990 (aged 24)	(Slovakia) HC Slovan Bratislava
82	F	Tomáš Kopecký – C	1.90 m (6 ft 3 in)	95 kg (209 lb)	February 5, 1982 (aged 33)	(United States) Florida Panthers
88	G	Július Hudáček	1.84 m (6 ft 0 in)	84 kg (185 lb)	August 9, 1988 (aged 26)	(Sweden) Örebro
90	F	Tomáš Tatar	1.78 m (5 ft 10 in)	80 kg (180 lb)	December 1, 1990 (aged 24)	(United States) Detroit Red Wings
97	F	Patrik Lušňák	1.80 m (5 ft 11 in)	85 kg (187 lb)	November 6, 1988 (aged 26)	(Belarus) Yunost Minsk

=== Slovenia ===
A 22-player roster was announced on 3 April 2015.

Head coach: Matjaž Kopitar

No.	Pos.	Name	Height	Weight	Birthdate	Team
4	D	Andrej Tavželj	1.88 m (6 ft 2 in)	95 kg (209 lb)	March 14, 1984 (aged 31)	(Russia) Toros Neftekamsk
7	D	Klemen Pretnar	1.80 m (5 ft 11 in)	82 kg (181 lb)	August 31, 1986 (aged 28)	(Austria) EC VSV
8	F	Žiga Jeglič	1.85 m (6 ft 1 in)	80 kg (180 lb)	February 24, 1988 (aged 27)	(Slovakia) HC Slovan Bratislava
9	F	Tomaž Razingar – C	1.83 m (6 ft 0 in)	89 kg (196 lb)	April 25, 1979 (aged 36)	(Slovakia) HK Dukla Trenčín
11	F	Anže Kopitar – A	1.93 m (6 ft 4 in)	93 kg (205 lb)	August 24, 1987 (aged 27)	(United States) Los Angeles Kings
14	D	Miha Štebih	1.90 m (6 ft 3 in)	92 kg (203 lb)	April 7, 1992 (aged 23)	(Czech Republic) HC Dukla Jihlava
15	D	Blaž Gregorc	1.90 m (6 ft 3 in)	95 kg (209 lb)	January 18, 1990 (aged 25)	(Czech Republic) HC Pardubice
16	F	Aleš Mušič	1.76 m (5 ft 9 in)	82 kg (181 lb)	June 28, 1982 (aged 32)	(Slovenia) HDD Olimpija Ljubljana
17	D	Žiga Pavlin	1.93 m (6 ft 4 in)	97 kg (214 lb)	April 30, 1985 (aged 30)	(Sweden) AIK IF
18	F	Ken Ograjenšek	1.77 m (5 ft 10 in)	75 kg (165 lb)	August 30, 1991 (aged 23)	(France) Gamyo Épinal
19	F	Žiga Pance	1.85 m (6 ft 1 in)	89 kg (196 lb)	January 1, 1989 (aged 26)	(Italy) HCB South Tyrol
22	F	Marcel Rodman – A	1.86 m (6 ft 1 in)	85 kg (187 lb)	September 25, 1981 (aged 33)	(Austria) EC KAC
23	D	Luka Vidmar	1.85 m (6 ft 1 in)	90 kg (200 lb)	May 17, 1986 (aged 28)	(Czech Republic) BK Mladá Boleslav
24	F	Rok Tičar	1.80 m (5 ft 11 in)	82 kg (181 lb)	May 3, 1989 (aged 25)	(Slovakia) HC Slovan Bratislava
26	F	Jan Urbas	1.92 m (6 ft 4 in)	98 kg (216 lb)	January 26, 1989 (aged 26)	(Sweden) VIK Västerås HK
28	D	Aleš Kranjc	1.82 m (6 ft 0 in)	91 kg (201 lb)	July 29, 1981 (aged 33)	(Sweden) Södertälje SK
32	G	Gašper Krošelj	1.88 m (6 ft 2 in)	86 kg (190 lb)	February 9, 1987 (aged 28)	(Sweden) IK Oskarshamn
33	G	Robert Kristan	1.82 m (6 ft 0 in)	85 kg (187 lb)	April 4, 1983 (aged 32)	(Czech Republic) HC Pardubice
39	F	Jan Muršak	1.80 m (5 ft 11 in)	87 kg (192 lb)	January 20, 1988 (aged 27)	(Russia) HC CSKA Moscow
40	G	Luka Gračnar	1.78 m (5 ft 10 in)	83 kg (183 lb)	October 31, 1993 (aged 21)	(Austria) EC Red Bull Salzburg
51	D	Mitja Robar	1.77 m (5 ft 10 in)	86 kg (190 lb)	January 4, 1983 (aged 32)	(Czech Republic) BK Mladá Boleslav
55	F	Robert Sabolič	1.83 m (6 ft 0 in)	90 kg (200 lb)	September 18, 1988 (aged 26)	(Czech Republic) HC Sparta Praha
71	F	Bostjan Goličič	1.83 m (6 ft 0 in)	88 kg (194 lb)	June 12, 1989 (aged 25)	(France) Rapaces de Gap
86	D	Sabahudin Kovačevič	1.90 m (6 ft 3 in)	95 kg (209 lb)	February 26, 1986 (aged 29)	(Austria) Graz 99ers
91	F	Miha Verlič	1.94 m (6 ft 4 in)	85 kg (187 lb)	August 21, 1991 (aged 23)	(Austria) Graz 99ers

=== United States ===
The roster was announced on 13 April 2015.

Head coach: Todd Richards

No.	Pos.	Name	Height	Weight	Birthdate	Team
1	G	Jack Campbell	1.91 m (6 ft 3 in)	83 kg (183 lb)	January 9, 1992 (aged 23)	(United States) Texas Stars
3	D	Seth Jones	1.93 m (6 ft 4 in)	93 kg (205 lb)	October 3, 1994 (aged 20)	(United States) Nashville Predators
5	D	Connor Murphy	1.93 m (6 ft 4 in)	96 kg (212 lb)	March 26, 1993 (aged 22)	(United States) Arizona Coyotes
6	D	Mike Reilly	1.85 m (6 ft 1 in)	83 kg (183 lb)	July 13, 1993 (aged 21)	(United States) Univ. of Minnesota
9	F	Jack Eichel	1.85 m (6 ft 1 in)	87 kg (192 lb)	October 28, 1996 (aged 18)	(United States) Boston Univ.
12	F	Ben Smith	1.80 m (5 ft 11 in)	93 kg (205 lb)	July 11, 1988 (aged 26)	(United States) San Jose Sharks
13	F	Nick Bonino	1.85 m (6 ft 1 in)	89 kg (196 lb)	April 20, 1988 (aged 27)	(Canada) Vancouver Canucks
14	F	Steve Moses	1.75 m (5 ft 9 in)	77 kg (170 lb)	August 9, 1989 (aged 25)	(Finland) Jokerit
17	D	John Moore	1.91 m (6 ft 3 in)	92 kg (203 lb)	November 19, 1990 (aged 24)	(United States) Arizona Coyotes
19	F	Jimmy Vesey	1.91 m (6 ft 3 in)	92 kg (203 lb)	May 26, 1993 (aged 21)	(United States) Harvard Univ.
21	F	Dylan Larkin	1.83 m (6 ft 0 in)	78 kg (172 lb)	July 30, 1996 (aged 18)	(United States) Univ. of Michigan
22	F	Trevor Lewis – A	1.85 m (6 ft 1 in)	90 kg (200 lb)	January 8, 1987 (aged 28)	(United States) Los Angeles Kings
23	F	Matt Hendricks – C	1.83 m (6 ft 0 in)	96 kg (212 lb)	June 17, 1981 (aged 33)	(Canada) Edmonton Oilers
24	D	Zach Redmond	1.88 m (6 ft 2 in)	93 kg (205 lb)	July 26, 1988 (aged 26)	(United States) Colorado Avalanche
26	F	Jeremy Morin	1.85 m (6 ft 1 in)	87 kg (192 lb)	April 16, 1991 (aged 24)	(United States) Columbus Blue Jackets
27	D	Justin Faulk – A	1.83 m (6 ft 0 in)	98 kg (216 lb)	March 20, 1992 (aged 23)	(United States) Carolina Hurricanes
29	F	Brock Nelson	1.91 m (6 ft 3 in)	89 kg (196 lb)	October 15, 1991 (aged 23)	(United States) New York Islanders
33	F	Charlie Coyle	1.91 m (6 ft 3 in)	100 kg (220 lb)	March 2, 1992 (aged 23)	(United States) Minnesota Wild
34	G	Alex Lyon	1.85 m (6 ft 1 in)	91 kg (201 lb)	December 9, 1992 (aged 22)	(United States) Yale Univ.
36	F	Mark Arcobello	1.83 m (6 ft 0 in)	78 kg (172 lb)	August 12, 1988 (aged 26)	(United States) Arizona Coyotes
37	G	Connor Hellebuyck	1.93 m (6 ft 4 in)	91 kg (201 lb)	May 19, 1993 (aged 21)	(Canada) St. John's IceCaps
42	F	Dan Sexton	1.78 m (5 ft 10 in)	77 kg (170 lb)	April 29, 1987 (aged 28)	(Russia) Neftekhimik Nizhnekamsk
47	D	Torey Krug	1.75 m (5 ft 9 in)	82 kg (181 lb)	April 12, 1991 (aged 24)	(United States) Boston Bruins
51	D	Jake Gardiner	1.88 m (6 ft 2 in)	83 kg (183 lb)	July 4, 1990 (aged 24)	(Canada) Toronto Maple Leafs
90	F	Anders Lee	1.88 m (6 ft 2 in)	102 kg (225 lb)	July 3, 1990 (aged 24)	(United States) New York Islanders
