= Patrick Wiercioch =

Canadian ice hockey player (born 1990)

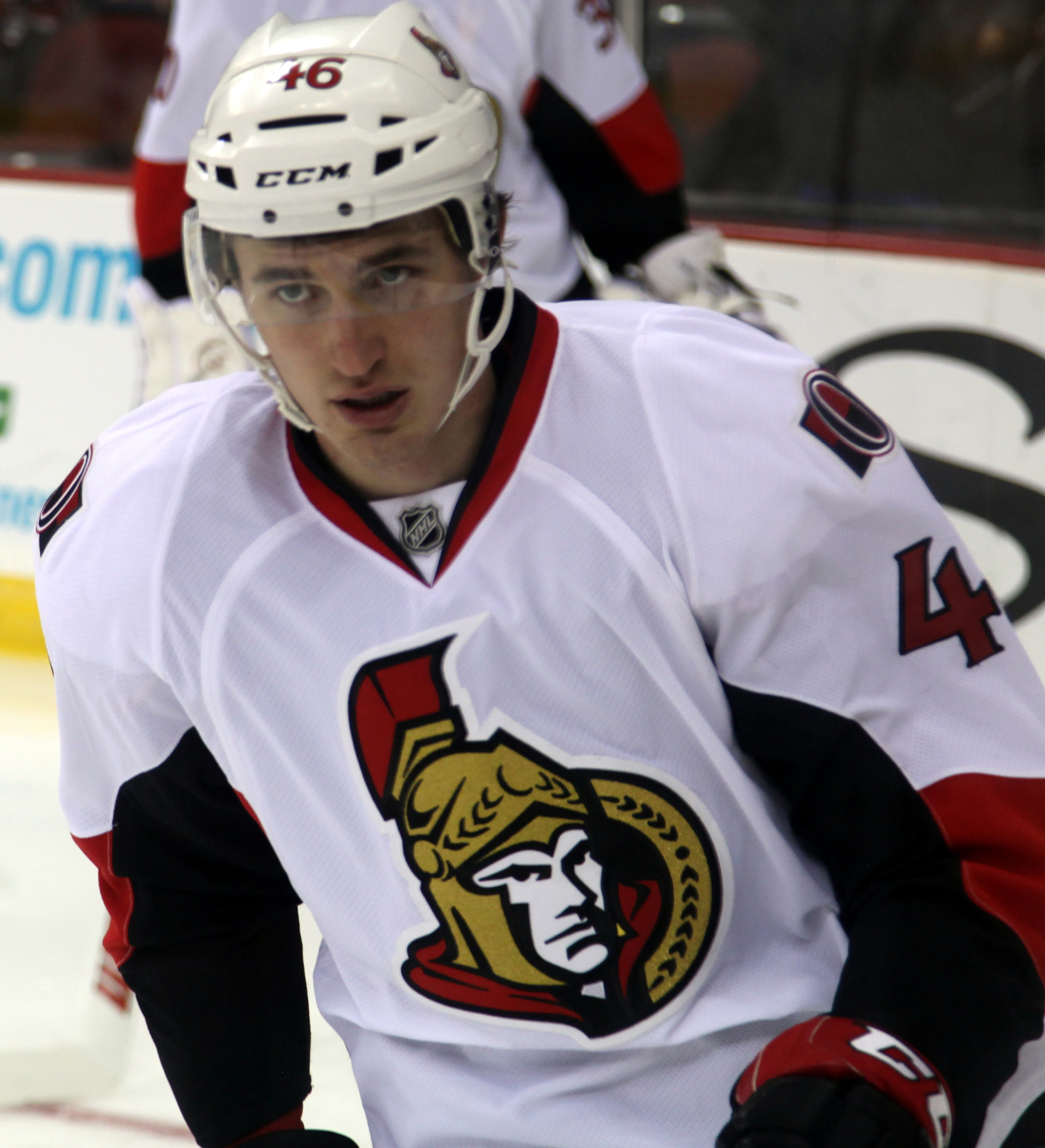
- Wiercioch in 2013
- Born: September 12, 1990 (age 35) Burnaby, British Columbia, Canada
- Height: 6 ft 6 in (198 cm)
- Weight: 190 lb (86 kg; 13 st 8 lb)
- Position: Defence
- Shot: Left
- Played for: Ottawa Senators; Colorado Avalanche; Dinamo Minsk; HC Bolzano; Timrå IK
- National team: Canada
- NHL draft: 42nd overall, 2008; Ottawa Senators
- Playing career: 2010–2021

Patrick Wiercioch (/ˈwɪərkɒʃ/ WEER-kosh; born September 12, 1990) is a Canadian former professional ice hockey defenceman. He formerly played in the National Hockey League (NHL) with the Ottawa Senators, the team who drafted him in 2008, and the Colorado Avalanche. Wiercioch was born in Burnaby, British Columbia, and grew up in Maple Ridge, British Columbia.

== Playing career ==
As a youth, Wiercioch played in the 2003 Quebec International Pee-Wee Hockey Tournament with a minor ice hockey team from North Vancouver.

=== Amateur ===
A Vancouver native, Wiercioch played junior hockey in the British Columbia Hockey League for the Burnaby Express in 2006–07 and later in the United States Hockey League with the Omaha Lancers in the 2007–08, when he was selected by the Ottawa Senators in the second round (42nd overall) of the 2008 NHL entry draft.

Having committed to the University of Denver of the Western Collegiate Hockey Association, Wiercioch began his collegiate career as a freshman in the 2008–09 season. In notching an impressive 12 goals and 35 points in 36 games in a regular role with the Pioneers, Wiercioch was selected to the All-Rookie Team and Second All-Star Team in the WCHA. In the following 2009–10 season as a sophomore, Wiercioch continued his positive development in recording 27 points in 39 games, being named to the First All-Star Team, and earning All-American honours.

=== Professional ===
Wiercioch signalled the completion of his athletic collegiate career in agreeing to a three-year, entry-level contract with the Ottawa Senators on April 2, 2010. He was slated to make his professional debut in the 2010–11 season, with the Senators affiliate, the Binghamton Senators of the American Hockey League. Earning a regular position within Binghamton's top four defenseman, Wiercioch contributed with 4 goals and 18 points in 67 regular season games. On March 22, 2011, he received his first recall up to the NHL to play for the Ottawa Senators. He made his NHL debut that night, in a 4-3 defeat to the Carolina Hurricanes. He later recorded his first NHL point, an assist, in a 5-4 shootout loss to the Atlanta Thrashers on March 27, 2011. After 8 games with Ottawa, Wiercioch was returned to the AHL for the post-season, appearing in 15 games for 1 assist to help the Binghamton Senators claim the Calder Cup.

Wiercioch played the entirety of the 2011–12 season, and the first half of the 2012–13 season with Binghamton, before he was called up after the resolution to the 2012–13 NHL lockout to appear with Ottawa again at the NHL level. Wiercioch scored his first NHL goal on March 3, 2013, against the New York Islanders. He finished the season 5th amongst the Senators in scoring with 19 points in 42 games, placing second in the league for scoring amongst rookie defensemen. As a restricted free agent, Wiercioch was re-signed to a three-year contract extension with the Ottawa Senators on July 23, 2013.

In the 2013–14 season, Wiercioch compiled a career best 19 assists for 23 points in 53 games, despite being a healthy scratch on 29 occasions. He appeared in his 100th career NHL game in a 4-1 victory over the Carolina Hurricanes on April 8, 2014. In the following 2014–15 season, Wiercioch having stalled in his offensive development struggled to cement a role in the Senators blueline. As a healthy scratch for a further 21 games under coach Dave Cameron, he compiled 3 goals and 13 points in 56 games. He rebounded in the post-season, co-leading the club with 2 goals and 4 points in a 6-game first round defeat to the Montreal Canadiens.

Wiercioch reverted to his previous season form in the 2015–16 season, continuing to struggle in going without a goal in 52 games for just 5 assists. Relegated to serving in a depth/reserve defensive role to end the season. Wiercioch played in four seasons with Ottawa before his tenure ended when the Senators chose not to give him a qualifying offer, making him a free agent.

On July 1, 2016, Wiercioch returned to his collegiate roots in Denver by signing a one-year contract with the Colorado Avalanche. Joining former Pioneer teammate and free agent signing Joe Colborne, Wiercioch began the 2016–17 season positively, recording an assist in a 6-5 season opening victory over the Dallas Stars on October 15, 2016. In his next game he collected his first Avalanche goal against the Pittsburgh Penguins on October 17, 2016. In his first 17 games with Colorado, Wiercioch had amassed 8 points. After cooling off offensively, Wiercioch completed the season having scored 12 points. In appearing in a career best 57 games, Wiercioch was unable to provide a stability to the blueline serving in a rotational scratch role to end the season with the cellar-dwelling Avalanche.

On June 26, 2017, Wiercioch, now a restricted free agent, was not retained after failing to be tendered a qualifying offer from the Avalanche. On July 1, 2017, Wiercioch was signed as a free agent to a one-year, $650,000 contract with his hometown team, the Vancouver Canucks.

As a free agent from the Canucks, and with limited interest in continuing in the AHL, Wiercioch embarked on a career abroad, agreeing to a one-year contract with Belarusian club, HC Dinamo Minsk of the Kontinental Hockey League (KHL) on July 9, 2018. Wiercioch enjoyed a successful season on the blueline with Minsk, posting 8 goals and 25 points in 59 games during the 2018–19 season.

Un-signed leading into the 2019–20 season, Wiercioch signed as a free agent to continue his European career with Italian club, HC Bolzano of the Austrian Hockey League (EBEL), on December 11, 2019. Following a lone season with Bolzano, Wiercioch moved to Sweden in helping Timrå IK gain promotion from the HockeyAllsvenskan to the Swedish Hockey League.

== International play ==
Medal record

Representing Canada

Ice hockey

World Championships
Gold medal – first place	2015 Czech Republic	

Wiercioch was first introduced to the international stage after he was invited to Canada's selection camp for the 2009 World Junior Championships. Failing to initially make the squad he was again invited the following season to selection camp for the 2010 World Junior Championships, however was unable to participate due to injury.

In 2015 Wiercioch was a member of Canada's gold medal-winning team at the World Championships, where they won the title for the first time since 2007 with a perfect 10-0 record.

== Personal life ==
Wiercioch and his wife, Kresson, have three children, Paxton, Lachlan and Leighton.

== Career statistics ==
=== Regular season and playoffs ===
			Regular season					Playoffs
Season	Team	League	GP	G	A	Pts	PIM	GP	G	A	Pts	PIM
2005–06	Vancouver North East Attack	BCMML	35	9	23	32	18	—	—	—	—	—
2006–07	Burnaby Express	BCHL	42	9	16	25	46	14	3	4	7	10
2007–08	Omaha Lancers	USHL	40	3	18	21	24	14	2	9	11	22
2008–09	University of Denver	WCHA	36	12	23	35	26	—	—	—	—	—
2009–10	University of Denver	WCHA	39	6	21	27	34	—	—	—	—	—
2010–11	Binghamton Senators	AHL	67	4	14	18	25	15	0	1	1	0
2010–11	Ottawa Senators	NHL	8	0	2	2	4	—	—	—	—	—
2011–12	Binghamton Senators	AHL	57	4	16	20	34	—	—	—	—	—
2012–13	Binghamton Senators	AHL	32	10	9	19	22	—	—	—	—	—
2012–13	Ottawa Senators	NHL	42	5	14	19	39	1	0	0	0	0
2013–14	Ottawa Senators	NHL	53	4	19	23	20	—	—	—	—	—
2014–15	Ottawa Senators	NHL	56	3	10	13	28	6	2	2	4	4
2015–16	Ottawa Senators	NHL	52	0	5	5	24	—	—	—	—	—
2016–17	Colorado Avalanche	NHL	57	4	8	12	23	—	—	—	—	—
2017–18	Utica Comets	AHL	58	10	27	37	45	5	0	3	3	2
2018–19	Dinamo Minsk	KHL	59	8	17	25	34	—	—	—	—	—
2019–20	HC Bolzano	EBEL	19	4	9	13	10	3	0	2	2	10
2020–21	Timrå IK	Allsv	11	0	7	7	8	12	3	4	7	12
NHL totals			268	16	58	74	138	7	2	2	4	4

=== International ===
Year	Team	Event	Result	GP	G	A	Pts	PIM
2015	Canada	WC	1st place, gold medalist(s)	10	1	3	4	0
Senior totals				10	1	3	4	0

== Awards and honours ==
Award	Year
USHL
Clark Cup (Omaha Lancers)	2008
College
All-WCHA Second Team	2009
All-WCHA Rookie Team	2009
WCHA All-Tournament Team	2009
All-WCHA First Team	2010
AHCA West First-Team All-American	2010
AHL
Calder Cup (Binghamton Senators)	2011
