= David Savard =

Canadian ice hockey player (born 1990)

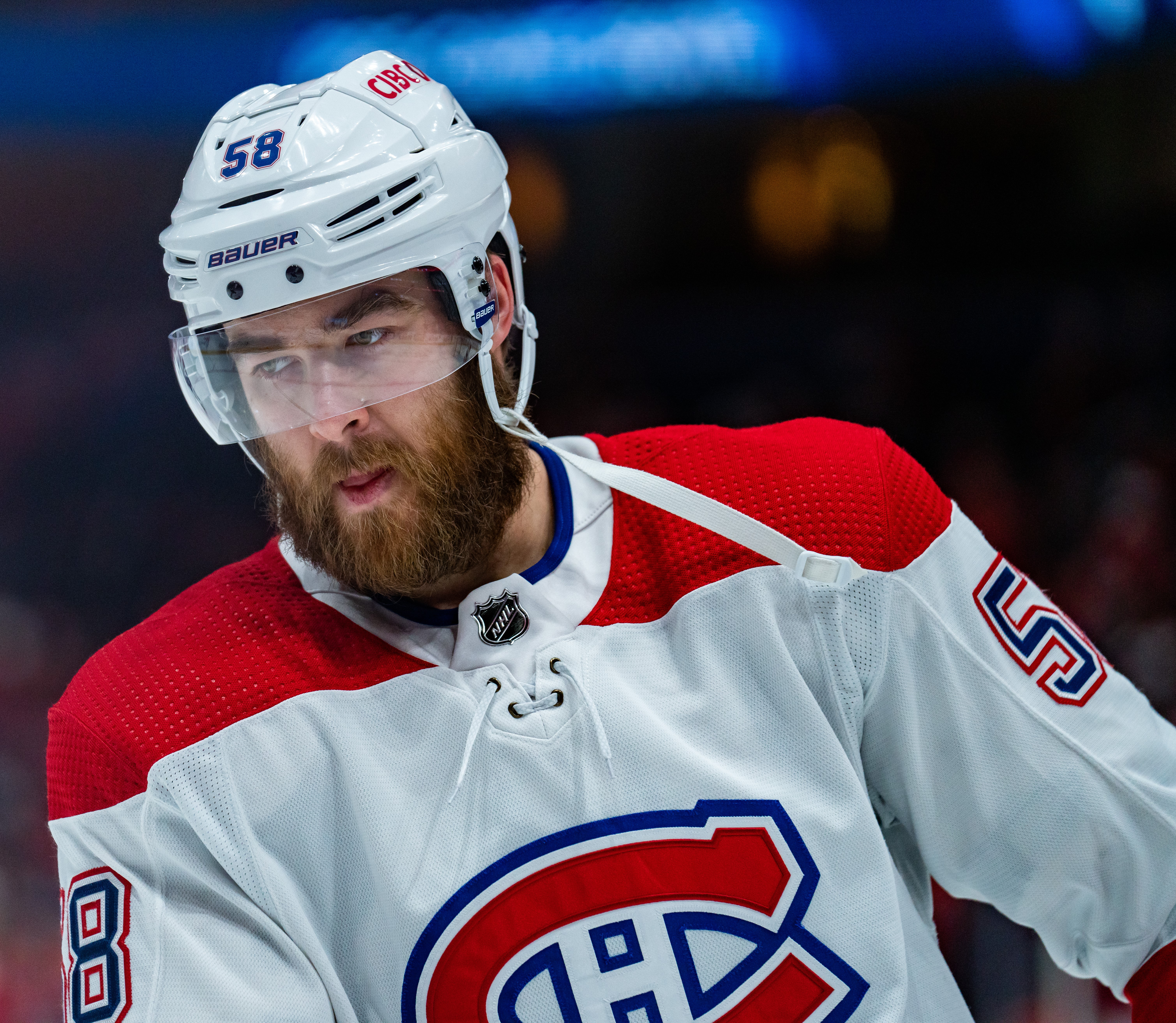
- Savard with the Montreal Canadiens in 2021
- Born: October 22, 1990 (age 35) Saint-Hyacinthe, Quebec, Canada
- Height: 6 ft 1 in (185 cm)
- Weight: 235 lb (107 kg; 16 st 11 lb)
- Position: Defence
- Shot: Right
- Played for: Columbus Blue Jackets; Tampa Bay Lightning; Montreal Canadiens
- National team: Canada
- NHL draft: 94th overall, 2009; Columbus Blue Jackets
- Playing career: 2010–2025

David Savard (born October 22, 1990) is a Canadian former professional ice hockey defenceman. He was selected in the fourth round, 94th overall, by the Columbus Blue Jackets in the 2009 NHL entry draft. Savard also played for the Tampa Bay Lightning, with whom he won the Stanley Cup in 2021, and Montreal Canadiens.

== Playing career ==
=== Early years ===
Born in Saint-Hyacinthe, Quebec, Savard played in the 2003 Quebec International Pee-Wee Hockey Tournament with a minor ice hockey team from Collège Antoine-Girouard as well as the Richelieu Éclaireurs in 2004. He, along with the Blizzard du Séminaire Saint-François of the Quebec Junior AAA Hockey League (QMAAA), finished third overall at the 2007 Telus Cup.

=== Junior ===
Savard was drafted by the Columbus Blue Jackets in the fourth round of the 2009 NHL entry draft after his second season in the Quebec Major Junior Hockey League (QMJHL) where he was known as a reliable defenceman with strong defensive skills.

The following QMJHL season, Savard began to support more in an offensive aspect, aiming to become a more complete player. Consequently, he was awarded many league trophies at year's end, including the Émile Bouchard Trophy as the best defensive defenceman, and the Kevin Lowe Trophy awarded to the best overall QMJHL defenceman, while finishing first in league scoring among defencemen and establishing a QMJHL record for assists at his position.

In the same year, Savard was selected to participate in the Subway Super Series, wearing a Quebec jersey in the tournament. He was also named the Canadian Hockey League (CHL) Defenceman of the Year, recognizing his remarkable QMJHL season with the Moncton Wildcats in which they captured the President's Cup championship en route to a berth in the 2010 Memorial Cup.

=== Professional ===
==== Columbus Blue Jackets ====
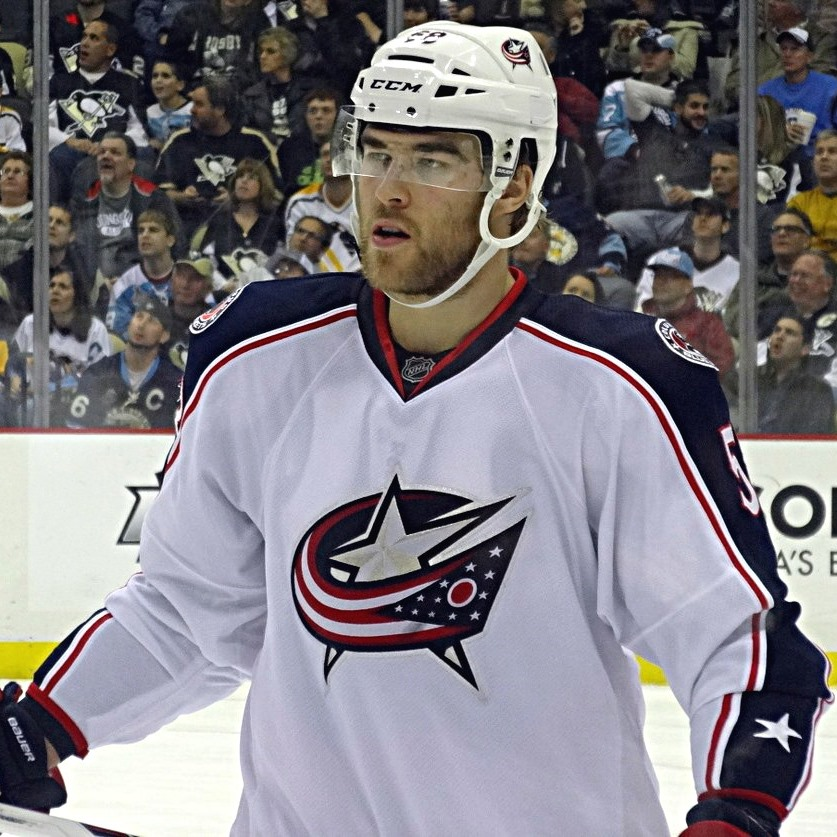
Savard with the Columbus Blue Jackets in 2013

In October 2010, while still eligible for major junior hockey, the Blue Jackets assigned Savard to play with the team's American Hockey League (AHL) affiliate the Springfield Falcons, where he finished as the team's top-scoring defenceman and second among all rookie blueliners leaguewide. He again joined the AHL ranks to begin the 2011–12 season.

On February 7, 2012, Savard scored his first career NHL goal against Minnesota Wild goalie Niklas Bäckström. After playing 31 games during the 2011–12 NHL season at the age of 21, he was slowed by an injury suffered in December 2012, shortly before the league lockout resolution. Thereafter, Savard spent the majority of the 2012–13 season with Springfield.

In July 2013, as a restricted free agent, Savard was re-signed to a one-year, two-way contract with the Blue Jackets organization.

Savard played his first full NHL season with the Blue Jackets for the 2013–14 campaign, registering 15 points in 70 games. On July 5, 2014, he signed a two-year contract extension with the team.

On September 15, 2015, Savard inked a five-year, $21.25 million contract extension with the Blue Jackets. During the 2016–17 season, he would effectively set a franchise record in plus–minus at +33.

==== Tampa Bay Lightning ====
Entering the final year of his contract in the pandemic delayed 2020–21 season, Savard collected one goal and six points through 40 regular-season games played. Approaching the annual NHL trade deadline, Savard was involved in a three-way trade involving Columbus, the Detroit Red Wings, and eventual destination Tampa Bay Lightning. He and the Lightning would then go on to win the Stanley Cup, with Savard contributing five points in 20 playoff games, including an assist on Ross Colton's series-clinching goal in game five of that year's Stanley Cup Final.

==== Montreal Canadiens and retirement ====
Following his Stanley Cup run with the Lightning, Savard opted to test free agency, securing a four-year, $14 million deal with the Montreal Canadiens on July 28, 2021. Drawing into the Canadiens' lineup amidst team captain and fellow bluneliner Shea Weber being placed on long-term injured reserve, Savard was regarded as part of the attempt to compensate for the foregoing's loss. Despite this, he antithetically became a focus of criticism from fans after what was an historically poor season for the team overall. On January 29, 2022, it was announced that Savard would miss eight weeks of the 2021–22 season due to an ankle injury. While injury likewise plagued his 2022–23 production, Savard received recognition as the team's annual recipient of the Jacques Beauchamp Molson Trophy, awarded to the player deemed to have had a dominant role during the course of the regular season. At the conclusion of the 2023–24 season, Savard was again named recipient of the Jacques Beauchamp-Molson Trophy, becoming just the fourth player in franchise history to accomplish this feat in consecutive years.

During the 2024–25 season, he skated in his 800th career NHL game, joining a select few from his respective draft class to reach this milestone. Shortly after the Canadiens secured their berth in the 2025 Stanley Cup playoffs, Savard announced that he would retire at the end of his team's respective postseason run, which culminated following their first-round series defeat by the Washington Capitals on April 30, 2025.

== International play ==
Medal record

Representing Canada

Men's ice hockey

World Championships
Gold medal – first place	2015 Czech Republic	

Savard was a member of Canada's gold medal-clinching team at the 2015 World Championships, where they won for the first time since 2007 with a perfect 10–0 record.

== Personal life ==
Savard married his longtime girlfriend, fellow Québécois Valerie Lachance, in their home province during the 2018 offseason. The couple has three children: Emma, Elliot and Zachary.

He is the youngest of three siblings.

== Career statistics ==
=== Regular season and playoffs ===
			Regular season					Playoffs
Season	Team	League	GP	G	A	Pts	PIM	GP	G	A	Pts	PIM
2006–07	Séminaire St-François Blizzard	QMAAA	44	10	16	26	52	18	1	12	13	10
2007–08	Baie-Comeau Drakkar	QMJHL	35	1	6	7	22	—	—	—	—	—
2007–08	Moncton Wildcats	QMJHL	32	0	5	5	18	—	—	—	—	—
2008–09	Moncton Wildcats	QMJHL	68	9	35	44	33	10	5	5	10	10
2009–10	Moncton Wildcats	QMJHL	64	13	64	77	36	21	1	14	15	8
2010–11	Springfield Falcons	AHL	72	11	32	43	18	—	—	—	—	—
2011–12	Springfield Falcons	AHL	44	4	18	22	72	—	—	—	—	—
2011–12	Columbus Blue Jackets	NHL	31	2	8	10	16	—	—	—	—	—
2012–13	Springfield Falcons	AHL	60	5	26	31	40	8	2	3	5	8
2012–13	Columbus Blue Jackets	NHL	4	0	0	0	0	—	—	—	—	—
2013–14	Columbus Blue Jackets	NHL	70	5	10	15	28	6	0	4	4	4
2014–15	Columbus Blue Jackets	NHL	82	11	25	36	71	—	—	—	—	—
2015–16	Columbus Blue Jackets	NHL	65	4	21	25	45	—	—	—	—	—
2016–17	Columbus Blue Jackets	NHL	74	6	17	23	44	5	0	1	1	4
2017–18	Columbus Blue Jackets	NHL	81	4	12	16	32	6	0	0	0	0
2018–19	Columbus Blue Jackets	NHL	82	8	16	24	36	10	1	2	3	4
2019–20	Columbus Blue Jackets	NHL	68	0	11	11	35	10	0	3	3	2
2020–21	Columbus Blue Jackets	NHL	40	1	5	6	24	—	—	—	—	—
2020–21	Tampa Bay Lightning	NHL	14	0	0	0	0	20	0	5	5	6
2021–22	Montreal Canadiens	NHL	62	3	14	17	36	—	—	—	—	—
2022–23	Montreal Canadiens	NHL	62	3	17	20	40	—	—	—	—	—
2023–24	Montreal Canadiens	NHL	60	6	18	24	24	—	—	—	—	—
2024–25	Montreal Canadiens	NHL	75	1	14	15	36	5	0	1	1	0
NHL totals			870	54	188	242	467	62	1	16	17	20

=== International ===
Year	Team	Event	Result	GP	G	A	Pts	PIM
2015	Canada	WC	1st place, gold medalist(s)	10	0	4	4	6
Senior totals				10	0	4	4	6

== Awards and honours ==
Award	Year	Ref
CHL
CHL Canada/Russia Series	2009	
CHL Defenceman of the Year	2010	
First All-Star Team	2010	
QMJHL
President's Cup champion	2010	
Emile Bouchard Trophy	2010	
Kevin Lowe Trophy	2010	
First All-Star Team	2010	
NHL
Stanley Cup champion	2021	
Montreal Canadiens
Jacques Beauchamp Molson Trophy	2023, 2024	

Awards and achievements
Preceded by Dmitri Kulikov	Emile Bouchard Trophy; 2009–10	Succeeded by Simon Després
Preceded by Maxime Ouimet	Kevin Lowe Trophy; 2009–10	Succeeded by Andrew Randazzo
Preceded by Jonathon Blum	CHL Defenceman of the Year; 2009–10	Succeeded by Ryan Ellis
