= Cody Eakin =

Canadian ice hockey player (born 1991)

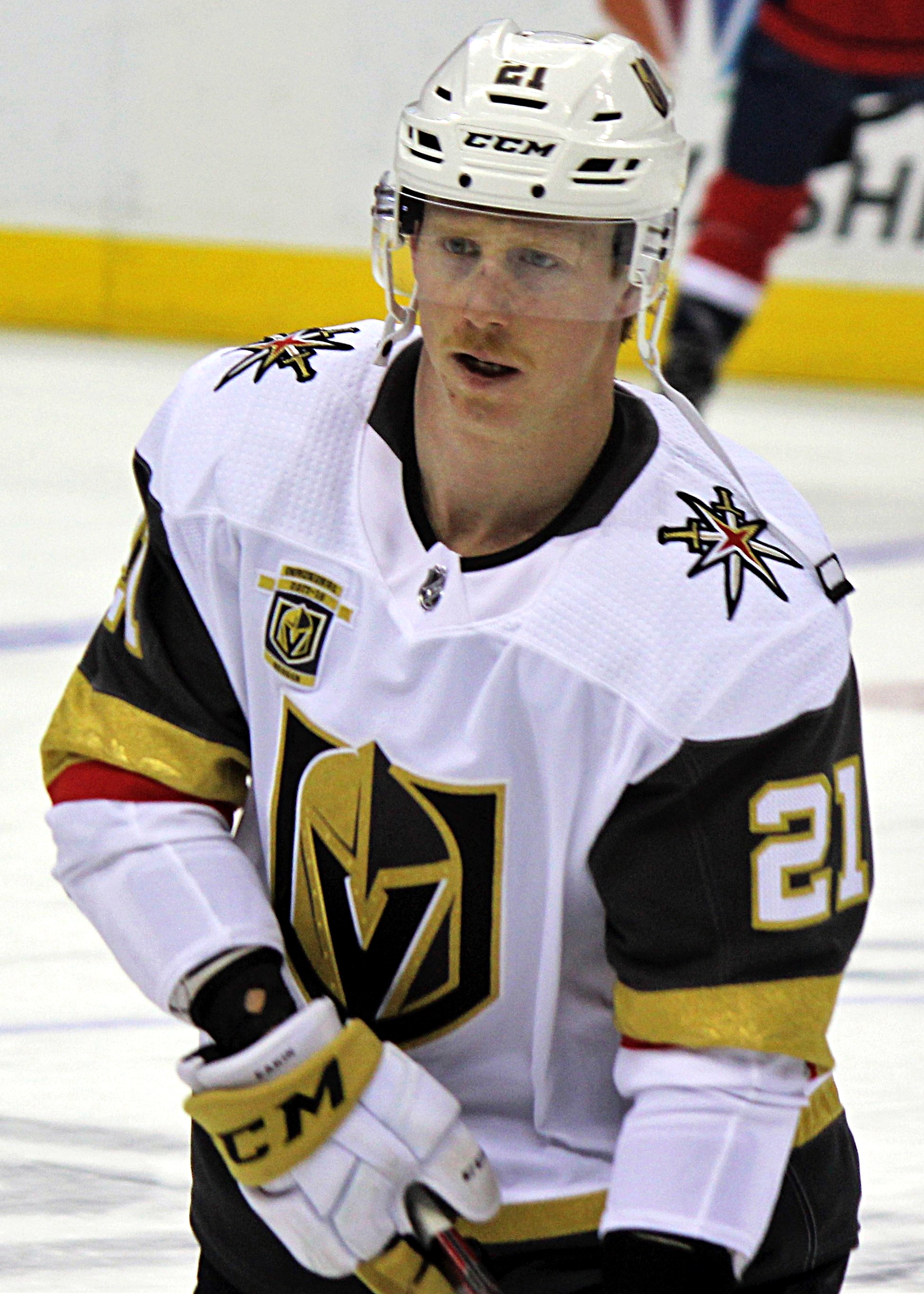
- Eakin with the Vegas Golden Knights in 2018
- Born: May 24, 1991 (age 35) Winnipeg, Manitoba, Canada
- Height: 6 ft 0 in (183 cm)
- Weight: 183 lb (83 kg; 13 st 1 lb)
- Position: Centre
- Shot: Left
- Played for: Washington Capitals; Dallas Stars; Vegas Golden Knights; Winnipeg Jets; Buffalo Sabres
- National team: Canada
- NHL draft: 85th overall, 2009; Washington Capitals
- Playing career: 2010–2023

Cody Eakin (born May 24, 1991) is a Canadian former professional ice hockey forward. He was selected by the Washington Capitals in the third round, 85th overall, of the 2009 NHL entry draft and has previously played for the Capitals, Dallas Stars, Vegas Golden Knights, Winnipeg Jets and Buffalo Sabres.

== Playing career ==
=== Major junior ===
Eakin was drafted in the first round, sixth overall, by the Swift Current Broncos in the 2006 WHL Draft. At the 2009 NHL entry draft, he was selected by the Washington Capitals in the third round, 85th overall.

In 2010, Eakin was named to the WHL (East) Second All-Star Team. On January 9, 2011, he was traded to the Kootenay Ice in exchange for Christian Magnus, Ryan Bloom, Jarett Zentner, Colby Cave, Steven Myland and three draft picks ranging from 2011 to 2012. In his first year with the Ice, Eakin was named to the WHL (East) Second All-Star Team.

=== Professional ===
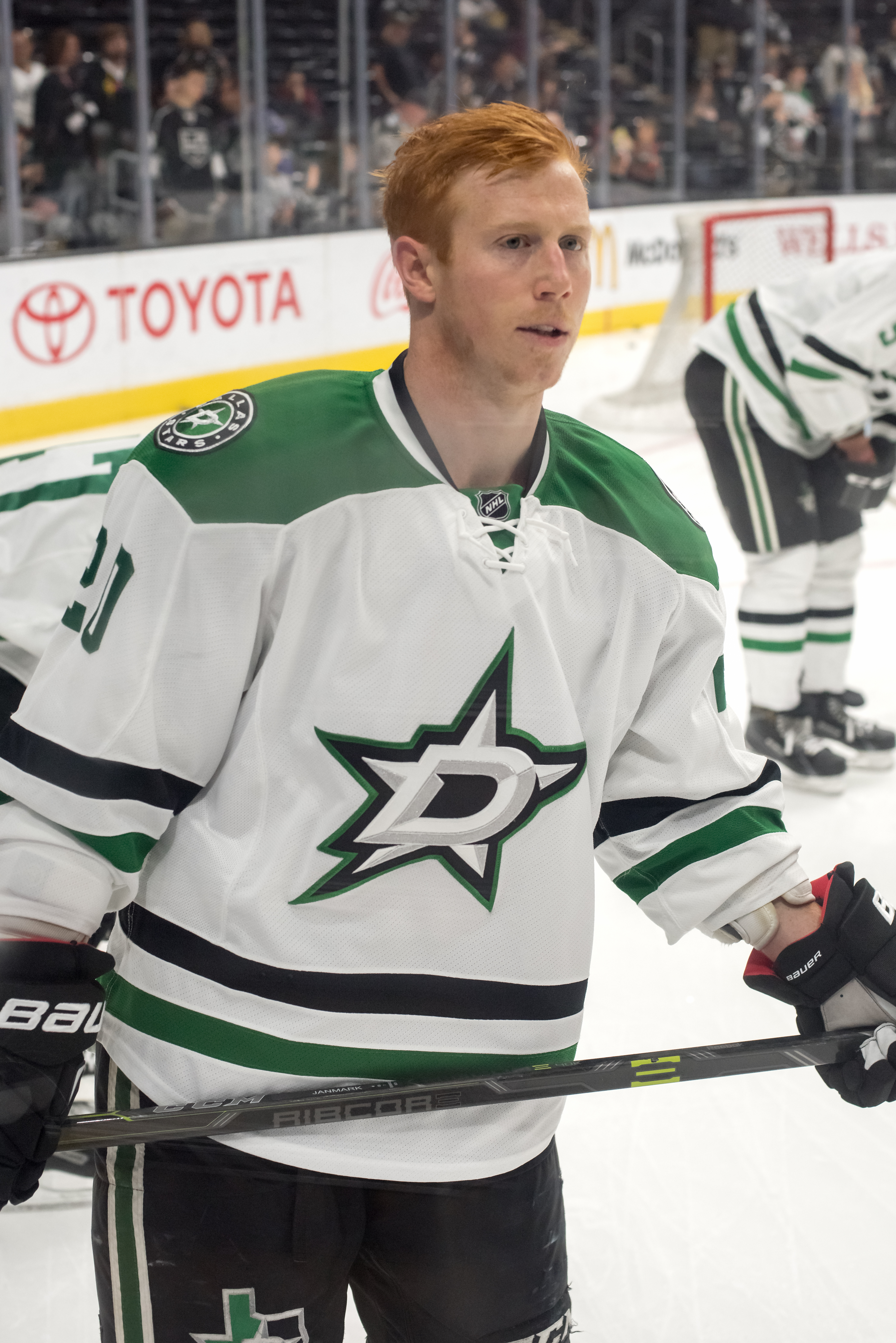
Eakin with the Stars in 2016

Eakin began the 2011–12 season with the Washington Capitals' American Hockey League (AHL) affiliate, the Hershey Bears. On November 1, 2011, the Capitals called-up Eakin to their roster, and the following day, he made his NHL debut with in 13 minutes 19 seconds of ice time, but no points, in 5–4 overtime win over the visiting Anaheim Ducks. Eakin scored his first NHL goal on November 4 against Cam Ward of the Carolina Hurricanes.

On June 22, 2012, during the 2012 NHL entry draft, Eakin was traded to the Dallas Stars (along with a second-round draft pick) in exchange for Mike Ribeiro.

Eakin scored his first career Stanley Cup playoff goal on April 23, 2014, against Frederik Andersen of the Anaheim Ducks. The goal ended up being the game-winner in a 4–2 victory as the Stars tied the series at two games apiece.

On December 16, 2016, Eakin was suspended for four games for charging New York Rangers' goaltender Henrik Lundqvist. Through injury and a lack of production, Eakin endured his worst season in the NHL during the 2016–17 campaign, scoring just 3 goals and 9 assists (12 points) in 60 games.

On June 21, 2017, Eakin was left exposed by the Stars and chosen by the Vegas Golden Knights in the 2017 NHL Expansion Draft. In his first season with Vegas, Eakin scored 11 goals and 27 points in 80 games. The team fell in five games to Eakin's former club, the Capitals, in the 2018 Stanley Cup Final. During the 2018 playoffs, Eakin scored 3 goals in 20 games.

The Golden Knights matched up with the San Jose Sharks during the first round of the 2019 playoffs. In Game 7 on April 23, Eakin cross-checked Joe Pavelski in the chest following a faceoff. Pavelski landed awkwardly on his head, causing the referees to issue Eakin a five-minute major penalty and a game misconduct, despite neither of them seeing the infraction as they mistakenly assumed that Pavelski had been checked in the head. At the time of the penalty, the Golden Knights were leading 3–0 with just over ten minutes remaining. However, the Sharks would score four goals on the ensuing five-minute power play. When a major penalty is called, the entire penalty must be served, regardless of how many goals are scored. Vegas tied the game with less than a minute left in the game, but the Sharks eventually won 5–4 in overtime, eliminating the Golden Knights. According to Golden Knights general manager George McPhee, the league called him days after their elimination to apologize for the call, while referees Eric Furlatt and Dan O'Halloran did not officiate another game in the remainder of the 2019 playoffs.

In the following 2019–20 season, Eakin struggled to produce offensively with the Golden Knights positing just 10 points through 41 games. On February 21, 2020, Eakin was traded by the Golden Knights to his hometown Winnipeg Jets in exchange for a 2021 conditional fourth-round pick. Later, on March 9, 2020, Eakin scored his first goal as a Winnipeg Jet - the game-winning goal - in a 4–2 win vs the Arizona Coyotes.

On October 10, 2020, having left the Jets as a free agent, Eakin signed a two-year, $4.5 million contract with the Buffalo Sabres.

On September 11, 2022, Eakin signed a professional tryout agreement with the Calgary Flames. On October 6, he, alongside Sonny Milano, were released from their tryouts.

== Personal life ==
Eakin grew up in an athletic family, as both his father and his uncle Bruce Eakin played professional hockey.

== International play ==
Medal record

Representing Canada

Ice hockey

World Championships
Gold medal – first place	2015 Czech Republic	

World Junior Championships
Silver medal – second place	2011 United States	

Eakin was a member of Canada's gold medal-winning team at the 2015 World Championships, where Canada won the title for the first time since 2007 with a perfect 10–0 record.

== Career statistics ==
=== Regular season and playoffs ===
			Regular season					Playoffs
Season	Team	League	GP	G	A	Pts	PIM	GP	G	A	Pts	PIM
2006–07	Winnipeg Wild AAA	MMHL	38	29	35	64	62	7	5	4	9	10
2006–07	Swift Current Broncos	WHL	3	0	0	0	0	—	—	—	—	—
2007–08	Swift Current Broncos	WHL	55	11	6	17	52	12	3	4	7	6
2008–09	Swift Current Broncos	WHL	54	24	24	48	42	7	3	0	3	10
2009–10	Swift Current Broncos	WHL	70	47	44	91	71	4	1	1	2	2
2009–10	Hershey Bears	AHL	4	2	0	2	2	5	0	0	0	2
2010–11	Swift Current Broncos	WHL	30	18	21	39	24	—	—	—	—	—
2010–11	Kootenay Ice	WHL	26	18	26	44	19	19	11	16	27	14
2011–12	Hershey Bears	AHL	43	13	14	27	10	5	0	1	1	0
2011–12	Washington Capitals	NHL	30	4	4	8	4	—	—	—	—	—
2012–13	Texas Stars	AHL	35	12	12	24	14	—	—	—	—	—
2012–13	Dallas Stars	NHL	48	7	17	24	31	—	—	—	—	—
2013–14	Dallas Stars	NHL	81	16	19	35	36	6	2	3	5	0
2014–15	Dallas Stars	NHL	78	19	21	40	26	—	—	—	—	—
2015–16	Dallas Stars	NHL	82	16	19	35	42	13	1	7	8	8
2016–17	Dallas Stars	NHL	60	3	9	12	49	—	—	—	—	—
2017–18	Vegas Golden Knights	NHL	80	11	16	27	22	20	3	1	4	4
2018–19	Vegas Golden Knights	NHL	78	22	19	41	16	7	2	0	2	17
2019–20	Vegas Golden Knights	NHL	41	4	6	10	16	—	—	—	—	—
2019–20	Winnipeg Jets	NHL	8	1	4	5	0	4	0	0	0	4
2020–21	Buffalo Sabres	NHL	46	3	4	7	14	—	—	—	—	—
2021–22	Buffalo Sabres	NHL	69	4	8	12	22	—	—	—	—	—
2022–23	SCL Tigers	NL	34	8	12	20	8	—	—	—	—	—
NHL totals			701	110	146	256	278	50	8	11	19	33

=== International ===
Year	Team	Event	Result	GP	G	A	Pts	PIM
2008	Canada	IH18	1st place, gold medalist(s)	4	2	1	3	0
2009	Canada	WJC18	4th	6	2	0	2	2
2011	Canada	WJC	2nd place, silver medalist(s)	7	1	2	3	2
2015	Canada	WC	1st place, gold medalist(s)	10	4	1	5	0
Junior totals				17	5	3	8	4
Senior totals				10	4	1	5	0

== Awards and honours ==
Award	Year
WHL
East Second All-Star Team	2010, 2011
