= Daniel Mitterdorfer =

Austrian ice hockey player

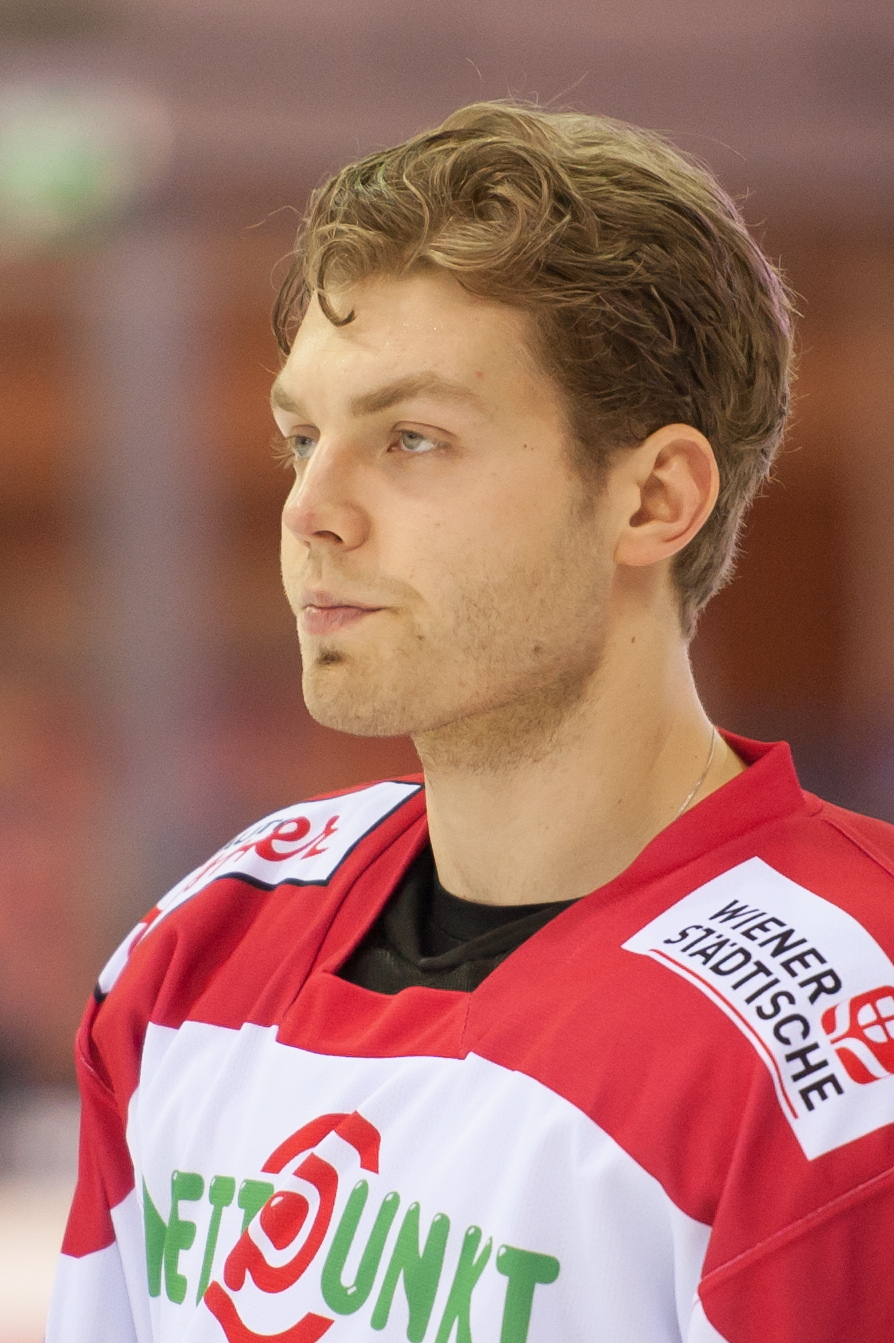
- Born: July 25, 1989 (age 36) Rum, Austria
- Height: 1.82 m (6 ft 0 in)
- Weight: 80 kg (176 lb; 12 st 8 lb)
- Position: Defence
- Shoots: Left
- EBEL team Former teams: HC TWK Innsbruck; EC Red Bull Salzburg; EHC Black Wings Linz; LeKi
- National team: Austria
- Playing career: 2005–present

Daniel Mitterdorfer (born July 25, 1989) is an Austrian professional ice hockey Defenseman currently playing for HC TWK Innsbruck in the Austrian Hockey League (EBEL). He has previously played for EC Red Bull Salzburg and EHC Black Wings Linz. He participated with the Austrian national team at the 2015 IIHF World Championship.
